= Toronto Maple Leafs =

National Hockey League team in Toronto, Ontario

- 2026–27 Toronto Maple Leafs season
- Conference: Eastern
- Division: Atlantic
- Founded: 1917
- History: Toronto Hockey Club; 1917–1918; Toronto Arenas; 1918–1919; Toronto St. Patricks; 1919–1927; Toronto Maple Leafs; 1927–present
- Home arena: Scotiabank Arena
- City: Toronto, Ontario
- Team colours: Blue, white
- Media: Sportsnet Ontario; TSN4; Sportsnet 590 The Fan; TSN Radio 1050
- Owner(s): Maple Leaf Sports & Entertainment (Keith Pelley, president & CEO)
- General manager: John Chayka
- Head coach: Jim Hiller
- Captain: Auston Matthews
- Minor league affiliates: Toronto Marlies (AHL); Cincinnati Cyclones (ECHL)
- Stanley Cups: 13 (1917–18, 1921–22, 1931–32, 1941–42, 1944–45, 1946–47, 1947–48, 1948–49, 1950–51, 1961–62, 1962–63, 1963–64, 1966–67)
- Conference championships: 0
- Presidents' Trophies: 0 (Note: The Presidents' Trophy was not introduced until 1985–86. Had the trophy existed since league inception, the Maple Leafs franchise would have won six Presidents' Trophies. The winning seasons would have included 1917–18, 1920–21, 1933–34, 1934–35, 1947–48, and 1962–63.)
- Division championships: 7 (1932–33, 1933–34, 1934–35, 1937–38, 1999–2000, 2020–21, 2024–25)
- Official website: nhl.com/mapleleafs

The Toronto Maple Leafs, officially the Toronto Maple Leaf Hockey Club and colloquially known as the Leafs, are a professional ice hockey team based in Toronto. The Maple Leafs compete in the National Hockey League (NHL) as a member of the Atlantic Division in the Eastern Conference. The club is owned by Maple Leaf Sports & Entertainment, a company that owns several professional sports teams in the city, while the team's broadcasting rights are split between BCE Inc. and Rogers Communications.

The club was founded as the Toronto Arenas for the inaugural 1917–18 NHL season and rebranded to the Toronto St. Patricks two years later. Conn Smythe renamed the franchise to the Maple Leafs after buying it in 1927. The team played home games at the Mutual Street Arena for its first 14 seasons before moving to Maple Leaf Gardens in 1931. Since February 1999, the Maple Leafs play at Scotiabank Arena, which was formerly known as Air Canada Centre.

Toronto has won more Stanley Cup championships and played more NHL seasons than any team other than the Montreal Canadiens. The club had two recognized dynasties which spanned the 1946–47 to 1950–51 seasons and the 1961–62 to 1966–67 seasons, during which the Leafs won a combined eight of eleven Stanley Cup championships. These successes were followed by an extended championship drought, which at 57 seasons (Note: The number of seasons does not coincide with the calendar year because no Stanley Cup was awarded in 2004–05.) is the longest in league history. The Maple Leafs have rivalries with the Boston Bruins, Buffalo Sabres, Detroit Red Wings, the Montreal Canadiens, and the Ottawa Senators. The team's American Hockey League (AHL) affiliate is the Toronto Marlies.

Several individuals who hold an association with the club have been inducted into the Hockey Hall of Fame. Nineteen players have had their numbers retired by the Maple Leafs, including the first in professional sports.

== History ==
=== Early years (1917–1927) ===
The National Hockey League (NHL) was formed in 1917 in Montreal by teams formerly belonging to the National Hockey Association (NHA) that had a dispute with Eddie Livingstone, owner of the Toronto Blueshirts. The owners of the other four clubs—the Montreal Canadiens, Montreal Wanderers, Quebec Bulldogs and the Ottawa Senators—wanted to replace Livingstone, but discovered that the NHA constitution did not allow them to simply vote him out of the league. Instead, they opted to create a new league, the NHL, and did not invite Livingstone to join them. They also remained voting members of the NHA, and thus had enough votes to suspend the other league's operations, effectively leaving Livingstone's league with one team.

The NHL had decided that it would operate a four-team circuit, made up of the Canadiens, Wanderers, Ottawa, and one more club in either Quebec City or Toronto. Toronto's inclusion in the NHL's inaugural season was formally announced on November 26, 1917, with concerns over the Bulldogs' financial stability surfacing. The League granted temporary franchise rights to the Arena Company, owners of the Arena Gardens. The NHL granted the Arena responsibility of the Toronto franchise for only the inaugural season, with specific instructions to resolve the dispute with Livingstone or transfer ownership of the Toronto franchise back to the League at the end of the season.

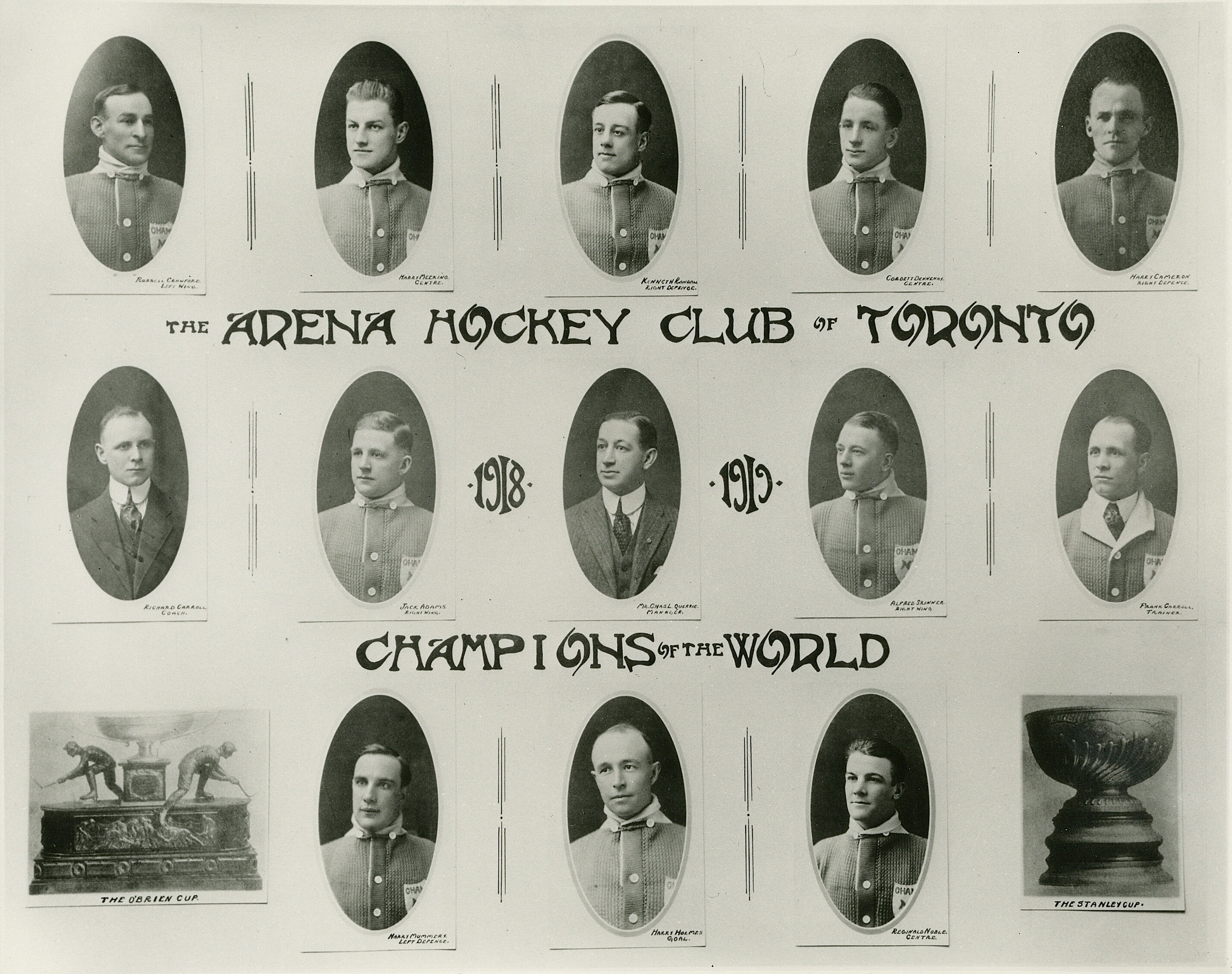
Team photo of the Arenas from the 1917–18 season. The club won its first Stanley Cup in their inaugural season.

The franchise did not have an official name but was informally called "the Blueshirts" or "the Torontos" by the fans and press. Although the inaugural roster was made up of players leased from the NHA's Toronto Blueshirts, including Harry Cameron and Reg Noble, the Maple Leafs do not claim the Blueshirts' history as their own. During the inaugural season, the club performed the first trade in NHL history, sending Sammy Hebert to the Senators, in return for cash. Under manager Charlie Querrie, and head coach Dick Carroll, the team won the Stanley Cup in the inaugural 1917–18 season.

For the next season, rather than return the Blueshirts' players to Livingstone as originally promised, on October 19, 1918, the Arena Company formed the Toronto Arena Hockey Club, which was readily granted full membership in the NHL. The Arena Company also decided that year that only NHL teams were allowed to play at the Arena Gardens—a move that effectively killed the NHA. Livingstone sued to get his players back. Mounting legal bills from the dispute forced the Arenas to sell some of their stars, resulting in a horrendous five-win season in 1918–19. With the company facing increasing financial difficulties, and the Arenas officially eliminated from the playoffs, the NHL agreed to let the team forfeit their last two games. Operations halted on February 20, 1919, with the NHL ending its season and starting the playoffs. The Arenas' .278 winning percentage that season remains the worst in franchise history. However, the 1919 Stanley Cup Final ended without a winner due to the worldwide flu epidemic.

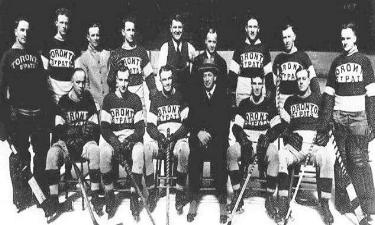
Team photo of the club during the 1921–22 season. Then known as the St. Patricks, the club won its second Stanley Cup in 1922.

The legal dispute forced the Arena Company into bankruptcy, and it was forced to sell the team. On December 9, 1919, Querrie brokered the team's purchase by the owners of the St. Patricks Hockey Club (Percy and Fred Hambly), allowing him to maintain an ownership stake in the team. The new owners renamed the team the Toronto St. Patricks (or St. Pats for short), which they used until 1927. Changing the colours of the team from blue to green, the club won their second Stanley Cup championship in 1922. Babe Dye scored four times in the 5–1 Stanley Cup-clinching victory against the Vancouver Millionaires.

In 1924, the team's ownership changed again, as movie theatre impresario Nathan Nathanson and mining magnate Jack Bickell purchased the shares of the Hamblys. Bickell invested CA$25,000 in the St. Pats as a favour to his friend Querrie, who needed to financially reorganize his hockey team.

=== Conn Smythe era (1927–1961) ===
After several financially difficult seasons, the St. Patricks' ownership group (Querrie and Nathan Nathanson) seriously considered selling the team to C. C. Pyle for CA$200,000 (equivalent to $3,608,791 in 2025). Pyle sought to move the team to Philadelphia. However, Toronto Varsity Blues coach Conn Smythe put together a group of his own and made a CA$160,000 (equivalent to $2,887,033 in 2025)) offer. With the support of minority shareholder Bickell, Smythe persuaded Querrie and Nathanson to accept their bid, arguing that civic pride was more important than money. Bickell would become team president.

Smythe took control on February 14, 1927; installing himself as governor and general manager. He immediately renamed the team the Maple Leafs, after the national symbol of Canada, but the team was forced to play out the remainder of the 1926–27 season as St. Patricks. (Note: According to an article in the Toronto Evening Telegram from February 17, 1927, the team was forced to keep the St.Patricks name so as not to void the player contracts and make them all free agents.) He attributed his choice of a maple leaf for the logo to his experiences as a Canadian Army officer and prisoner of war during World War I. Viewing the maple leaf as a "badge of courage", and a reminder of home, Smythe decided to give the same name to his hockey team, in honour of the many Canadian soldiers who wore it. However, the team was not the first to use the name. A Toronto minor-league baseball team had used the name "Toronto Maple Leafs" since 1895. Although Smythe would not acquire controlling interest in the team until 1947, he would be the franchise's dominant voice for the next four decades.

Initial reports were that the team's colours were to be red and white, but the Leafs wore white sweaters with a green maple leaf for their first game on February 17, 1927. On September 27, 1927, it was announced that the Leafs had changed their colour scheme to blue and white. Although Smythe later stated he chose blue because it represents the Canadian skies and white to represent snow, these colours were also used on the trucks for his gravel and sand business. The colour blue was also a colour historically associated with the City of Toronto. The use of blue by top-level Toronto-based sports clubs began with the Argonaut Rowing Club in the 19th century, later adopted by their football team, the Toronto Argonauts, in 1873.

==== Opening of Maple Leaf Gardens (1930s) ====
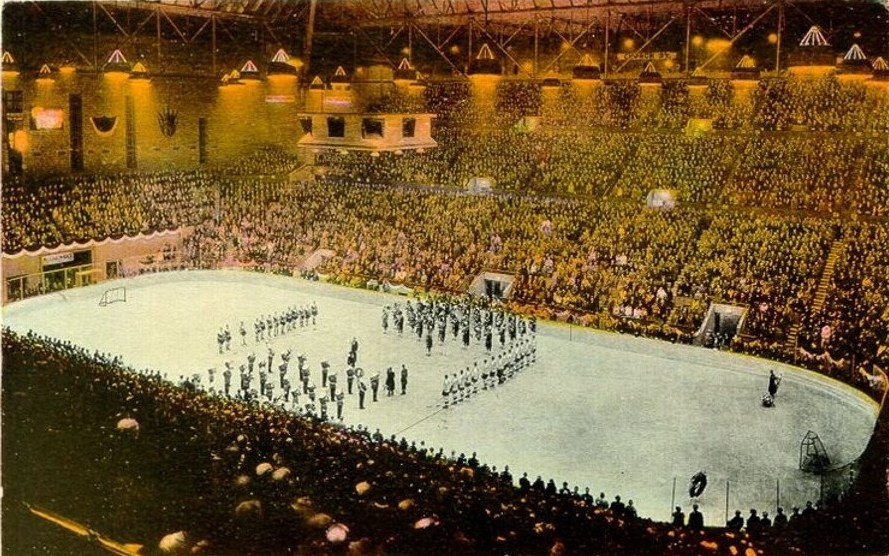
Opening ceremony for the first game at Maple Leaf Gardens on November 11, 1931

By 1930, Smythe saw the need to construct a new arena, viewing the Arena Gardens as a facility lacking modern amenities and seating. Finding an adequate number of financiers, he purchased land from the Eaton family, and construction of the arena was completed in five months.

The Maple Leafs debuted at their new arena, Maple Leaf Gardens, with a 2–1 loss to the Chicago Black Hawks on November 12, 1931. The opening ceremonies for Maple Leaf Gardens included a performance from the 48th Highlanders of Canada Pipe and Drums. The military band has continued to perform in every subsequent season home opening game, as well as other ceremonies conducted by the hockey club. The debut also featured Foster Hewitt in his newly constructed press box above the ice surface, where he began his famous Hockey Night in Canada radio broadcasts that eventually came to be a Saturday-night tradition. The press box was often called "the gondola", a name that emerged during the Gardens' inaugural season when a General Motors advertising executive remarked how it resembled the gondola of an airship.

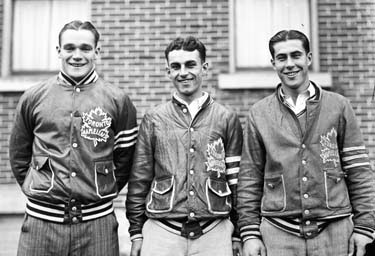
The Kid Line consisted of Charlie Conacher, Joe Primeau, and Busher Jackson (left to right). They led the Leafs to win the 1932 Stanley Cup, as well as four more Stanley Cup Final appearances over the next six years.

By the 1931–32 NHL season, the Maple Leafs were led by the "Kid Line" consisting of Busher Jackson, Joe Primeau and Charlie Conacher and coached by Dick Irvin. The team captured their third Stanley Cup that season, vanquishing the Chicago Black Hawks in the first round, the Montreal Maroons in the semifinals, and the New York Rangers in the 1932 Stanley Cup Final. Smythe took particular pleasure in defeating the Rangers that year. He had been tapped as the Rangers' first general manager and coach for their inaugural season (1926–27), but had been fired in a dispute with Madison Square Garden management before the season had begun.

Maple Leafs star forward Ace Bailey was nearly killed during the 1933–34 season when Eddie Shore of the Boston Bruins checked him from behind at full speed into the boards. Maple Leafs' defenceman Red Horner knocked Shore out with a punch, but Bailey, writhing on the ice, had his career ended. The Leafs held the Ace Bailey Benefit Game, the NHL's first All-Star Game, to collect medical funds to help Bailey. His jersey was retired later the same night. The Leafs reached the Stanley Cup Final five times in the next seven years but bowed out to the now-disbanded Maroons in 1935, the Detroit Red Wings in 1936, Chicago in 1938, Boston in 1939 and the Rangers in 1940. After the end of the 1939–40 season, Smythe allowed Irvin to leave the team as head coach, replacing him with former Maple Leafs' captain Hap Day.

==== The first dynasty (1940s) ====
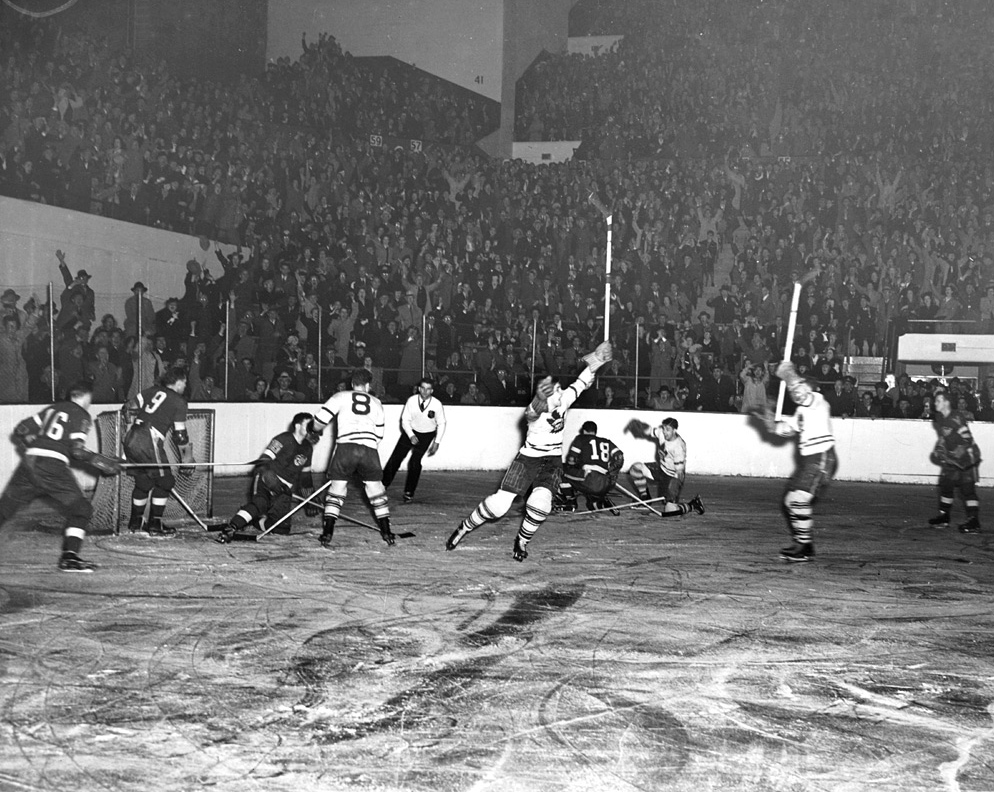
The Maple Leafs score against Detroit during the 1942 Cup Final. The Leafs went on to win the series, performing the only reverse-sweep in the Final.

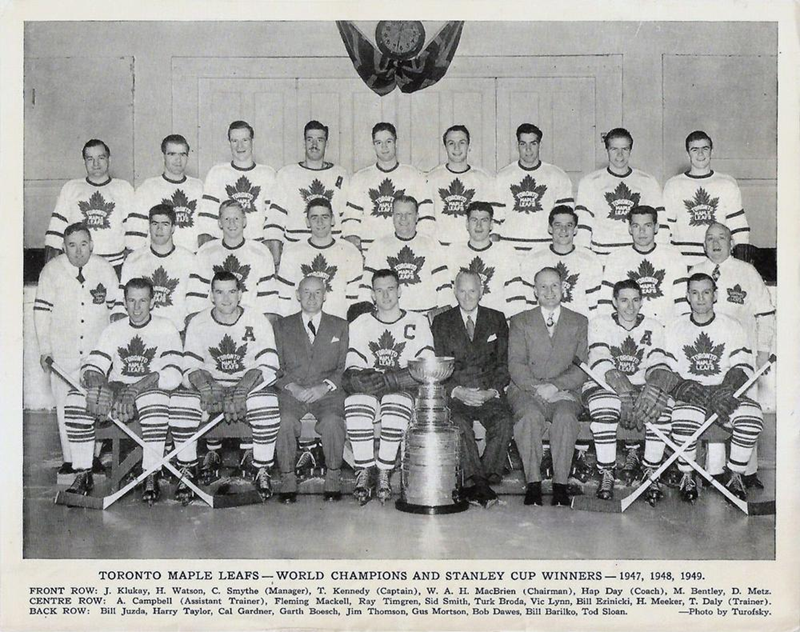
The Maple Leafs won the Stanley Cup three consecutive years from 1947 to 1949.

In the 1942 Stanley Cup Final, the Maple Leafs were down three games to none in the best-of-seven series against Detroit. Fourth-line forward Don Metz then galvanized the team, to score a hat-trick in game four and the game-winner in game five. Goalie Turk Broda shut out the Wings in game six, and Sweeney Schriner scored two goals in the third period to win the seventh game 3–1, completing the reverse-sweep. The Leafs remain the only team to have successfully performed a reverse-sweep in the Stanley Cup Final. Captain Syl Apps won the Lady Byng Memorial Trophy that season, not taking one penalty, and finished his 10-season career with an average of 5 minutes, 36 seconds in penalties a season.

Smythe, who reenlisted in the Canadian Army at the outbreak of World War II, was given leave from military duty to view the final game of the 1942 Cup Final. He arrived at the game in full military regalia. Earlier, at the outbreak of war, Smythe arranged for many of his Maple Leafs players and staff to take army training with the Toronto Scottish Regiment. Most notably, the Leafs announced a large portion of their roster had enlisted, including Apps, and Broda, who did not play on the team for several seasons due to their obligations with the Canadian Forces. During this period, the Leafs turned to lesser-known players such as rookie goaltender Frank McCool and defenceman Babe Pratt.

The Maple Leafs beat the Red Wings in the 1945 Final. They won the first three games, with goaltender McCool recording consecutive shutouts. However, in a reversal of the 1942 Final, the Red Wings won the next three games. The Leafs were able to win the series, winning the seventh game by the score of 2–1 to prevent a complete reversal of the series played three years ago.

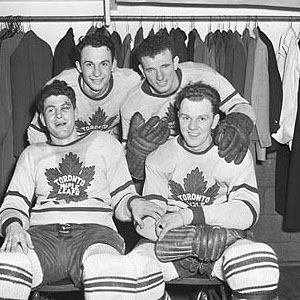
From left to right: Vic Lynn, Gus Mortson, Ted Kennedy and Bud Poile pictured in the 1946–47 season. The team would win its sixth Stanley Cup that season. Kennedy would be named team captain in 1948, serving the position until 1955.

After the end of the war, players who had enlisted were beginning to return to their teams. With Apps and Broda regaining their form, the Maple Leafs beat the first-place Canadiens in the 1947 Final. To bolster their centre depth, the Leafs acquired Cy Thomas and Max Bentley in the following off-season. With these key additions, the Leafs were able to win a second consecutive Stanley Cup, sweeping the Red Wings in the 1948 Final. With their victory in 1948, the Leafs moved ahead of Montreal as the team having won the most Stanley Cups in League history. Apps announced his retirement following the 1948 Final, with Ted Kennedy replacing him as the team's captain. Under a new captaincy, the Leafs managed to make it to the 1949 Final, facing the Red Wings, who had finished the season with the best overall record. However, the Leafs went on to win their third consecutive Cup, sweeping the Red Wings in four games. This brought the total of Detroit's playoff game losses against the Leafs to eleven. The Red Wings were able to end this losing streak in the following postseason, eliminating Toronto in the 1950 NHL playoffs.

==== The Barilko Curse (1950s) ====
The Maple Leafs and Canadiens met again in the 1951 Final, with five consecutive overtime games played in the series. Defenceman Bill Barilko managed to score the series-winning goal in overtime, leaving his defensive position (despite coach Joe Primeau's instructions otherwise) to pick up an errant pass and score. Barilko helped the club secure its fourth Stanley Cup in five years. His glory was short-lived, as he disappeared in a plane crash near Timmins, Ontario, four months later. The crash site was not found until a helicopter pilot discovered the plane's wreckage plane about 80 kilometres (50 mi) north of Cochrane, Ontario 11 years later. The Leafs did not win another Cup during the 1950s, with rumours swirling that the team was "cursed", and would not win a cup until Barilko's body was found. The "curse" came to an end after the Leafs' 1962 Stanley Cup victory, which came six weeks before the discovery of the wreckage of Barilko's plane.

Their 1951 victory was followed by lacklustre performances in the following seasons. The team finished third in the 1951–52 season and was eventually swept by the Red Wings in the semifinals. With the conclusion of the 1952–53 regular season, the Leafs failed to make it to the postseason for the first time since the 1945–46 playoffs. The Leafs' poor performance may be attributed partly to a decline in their sponsored junior system (including the Toronto St. Michael's Majors and the Toronto Marlboros). The junior system was managed by Frank J. Selke until his departure to the Canadiens in 1946. In his absence, the quality of players it produced declined. Many who were called up to the Leafs in the early 1950s were found to be seriously lacking in ability. It was only later in the decade that the Leafs' feeder clubs produced prospects that helped them become competitive again.

After a two-year drought from the playoffs, the Maple Leafs clinched a berth after the 1958–59 season. Under Punch Imlach, their new general manager and coach, the Leafs made it to the 1959 Final, losing to the Canadiens in five games. Building on a successful playoff run, the Leafs followed up with a second-place finish in the 1959–60 regular season. Although they advanced to their second straight Cup Final, the Leafs were again defeated by the Canadiens in four games.

=== New owners and a new dynasty (1961–1971) ===
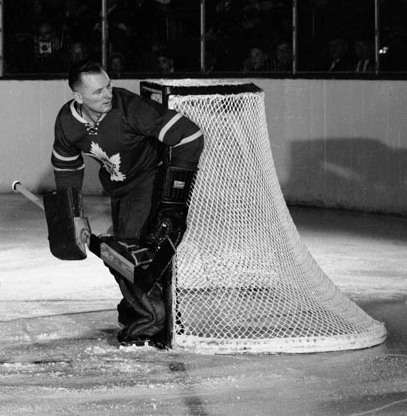
Johnny Bower was the Maple Leafs' goaltender from 1958 to 1969. He helped the team win four Cups.

Beginning in the 1960s, the Leafs became a stronger team, with Johnny Bower as the goaltender, and Bob Baun, Carl Brewer, Tim Horton and Allan Stanley serving as the Maple Leafs' defencemen. To bolster their forward group during the 1960 off-season, Imlach traded Marc Reaume to the Red Wings for Red Kelly. Originally a defenceman, Kelly was asked to make the transition to the role of centre, where he remained for the rest of his career. Kelly helped reinforce a forward group made up of Frank Mahovlich, and team captain George Armstrong. The beginning of the 1960–61 season also saw the debut of rookies Bob Nevin, and Dave Keon. Keon previously played for the St. Michael's Majors (the Maple Leafs junior affiliate), but had impressed Imlach during the Leafs' training camp, and joined the team for the season. Despite these new additions, the Leafs' 1961 playoff run ended in the semifinals against the Red Wings, with Armstrong, Bower, Kelly and others, suffering from injuries.

In November 1961, Smythe sold nearly all of his shares in the club's parent company, Maple Leaf Gardens Limited (MLGL), to a partnership composed of his son Stafford Smythe, and his partners, newspaper baron John W. H. Bassett and Toronto Marlboros president Harold Ballard. The sale price was $2.3 million (equivalent to $24,000,000 in 2025), a handsome return on Smythe's original investment 34 years earlier. Initially, Conn Smythe claimed that he knew nothing about his son's partners and was furious with the arrangement (though it is highly unlikely he could have believed Stafford could have financed the purchase on his own). However, he did not stop the deal because of it. Conn Smythe was given a retiring salary of $15,000 per year for life, an office, a secretary, a car with a driver, and seats to home games. Smythe sold his remaining shares in the company, and resigned from the board of directors in March 1966, after a Muhammad Ali boxing match was scheduled for the Gardens. Smythe found Ali's refusal to serve in the United States Army offensive, noting that the Gardens was "no place for those who want to evade conscription in their own country". He had also said that because the Gardens' owners agreed to host the fight they had "put cash ahead of class".

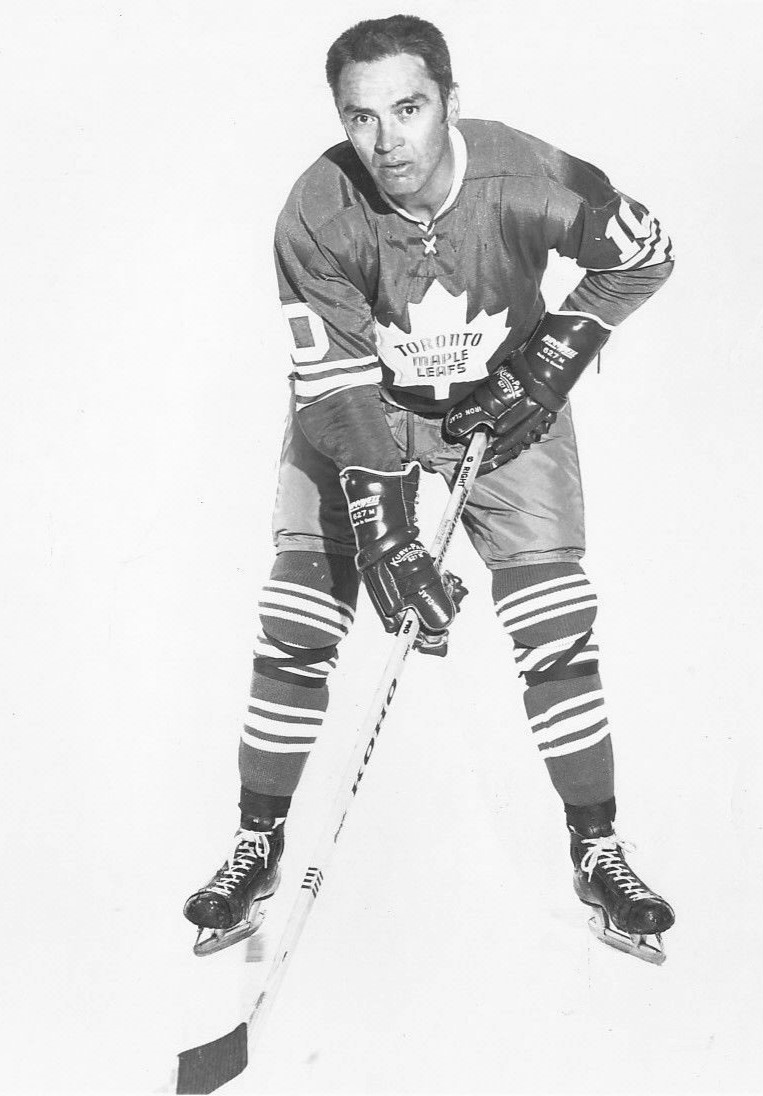
Captaining the team from 1958 to 1969, George Armstrong led the team to four Stanley Cups. Armstrong is the all-time leader in games played with the Maple Leafs.

Under the new ownership, Toronto won another three straight Stanley Cups. The team won the 1962 Stanley Cup Final beating the defending champion Chicago Black Hawks on a goal from Dick Duff in game 6. During the 1962–63 season, the Leafs finished first in the league for the first time since the 1947–48 season. In the following playoffs, the team won their second Stanley Cup of the decade. The 1963–64 season saw certain members of the team traded. With Imlach seeking to reinvigorate the slumping Leafs, he made a mid-season trade that sent Duff, and Nevin to the Rangers for Andy Bathgate and Don McKenney. The Leafs managed to make the postseason as well as the Cup Final. In game six of the 1964 Cup Final, Baun suffered a fractured ankle and required a stretcher to be taken off the ice. He returned to play with his ankle frozen, and eventually scored the game-winning goal in overtime against the Red Wings. The Leafs won their third consecutive Stanley Cup in a 4–0 game 7 victory; Bathgate scored two goals.

The two seasons after the Maple Leafs' Stanley Cup victories, the team saw several player departures, including Bathgate, and Brewer, as well as several new additions, including Marcel Pronovost, and Terry Sawchuk. During the 1966–67 season, the team had lost 10 games in a row, sending Imlach to the hospital with a stress-related illness. However, from the time King Clancy took over as the head coach, to Imlach's return, the club was on a 10-game undefeated streak, building momentum before the playoffs. The Leafs made their last Cup Final in 1967. Playing against Montreal, the heavy favourite for the year, the Leafs managed to win, with Bob Pulford scoring the double-overtime winner in game three; Jim Pappin scored the series winner in game 6. Keon was named the playoff's most valuable player and was awarded the Conn Smythe Trophy.

From 1968 to 1970, the Maple Leafs made it to the playoffs only once. They lost several players to the 1967 NHL expansion draft, and the team was racked with dissension because of Imlach's authoritative manner, and his attempts to prevent the players from joining the newly formed Players' Association. Imlach's management of the team was also brought into question due to some of his decisions. It was apparent that he was too loyal to aging players who had been with him since 1958. In the 1967–68 season, Mahovlich was traded to Detroit in a deal that saw the Leafs acquire Paul Henderson and Norm Ullman. The Leafs managed to return to the playoffs after the 1968–69 season, only to be swept by the Bruins. Immediately after, Stafford Smythe confronted Imlach and fired him. This act was not without controversy, with some older players, including Horton, declaring that, "if this team doesn't want Imlach, I guess it doesn't want me".

The Maple Leafs completed the 1969–70 season out of the playoffs. With their low finish, the Leafs were able to draft Darryl Sittler at the 1970 NHL amateur draft. The Leafs returned to the playoffs after the 1970–71 season with the addition of Sittler, as well as Bernie Parent and Jacques Plante, who were both acquired through trades during the season. They were eliminated in the first round against the Rangers.

=== The Ballard years (1971–1990) ===
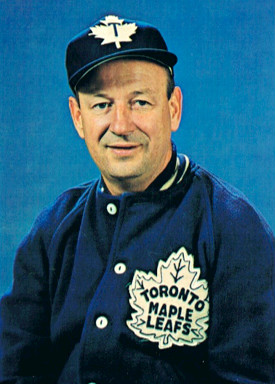
Punch Imlach won four Cups as the Leafs' coach in the 1960s. However, his second stint as general manager in the 1979–80 season was controversial, as he traded Lanny McDonald, and engaged in a public dispute with team captain Darryl Sittler.

A series of events in 1971 made Harold Ballard the primary owner of the Maple Leafs. After a series of disputes between Bassett, Ballard and Stafford Smythe, Bassett sold his stake in the company to them. Shortly afterwards, Smythe died in October 1971. Under the terms of Stafford's will, of which Ballard was an executor, each partner was allowed to buy the other's shares upon their death. Stafford's brother and son tried to keep the shares in the family, but in February 1972 Ballard bought all of Stafford's shares for $7.5 million, valuing the company at $22 million (equivalent to $165,000,000 in 2025). Six months later, Ballard was convicted of charges including fraud, and theft of money and goods, and spent a year at Milhaven Penitentiary.

By the end of 1971, the World Hockey Association (WHA) began operations as a direct competitor to the NHL. Believing the WHA would not be able to compete against the NHL, Ballard's attitude caused the Maple Leafs to lose key players, including Parent to the upstart league. Undermanned and demoralized, the Leafs finished with the fourth-worst record for the 1972–73 season. They got the fourth overall pick in the 1973 NHL amateur draft, and drafted Lanny McDonald. General Manager Jim Gregory also acquired the 10th overall pick from the Philadelphia Flyers, and the 15th overall pick from the Bruins, using them to acquire Bob Neely and Ian Turnbull. In addition to these first-round picks, the Leafs also acquired Börje Salming during the 1973 off-season.

Despite acquiring Tiger Williams in the 1974 draft, and Roger Neilson as head coach in the 1977–78 season, the Maple Leafs found themselves eliminated in the playoffs by stronger Flyers or Canadiens teams from 1975 to 1979. Although Neilson was a popular coach with fans and his players, he found himself at odds with Ballard, who fired him late in the 1977–78 season. Neilson was later reinstated after appeals from the players and the public. He continued as Leafs' head coach until after the 1979 playoffs, when he was fired again, alongside Gregory. Gregory was replaced by Imlach as general manager.

In the first year of his second stint as general manager, Imlach became embroiled in a dispute with Leafs' captain Darryl Sittler over his attempt to take part in the Showdown series for Hockey Night in Canada. In a move to undermine Sittler's influence on the team, Imlach traded McDonald, who was Sittler's friend. By the end of the 1979–80 season, Imlach had traded away nearly half of the roster he had at the beginning of his tenure as general manager. With the situation between Ballard and Sittler worsening, Sittler asked to be traded. Forcing the Leafs' hand, the club's new general manager, Gerry McNamara, traded Sittler to the Flyers on January 20, 1982. Rick Vaive was named the team's captain shortly after Sittler's departure.

The Maple Leafs' management continued in disarray throughout most of the decade, with an inexperienced McNamara named as Imlach's replacement in September 1981. He was followed by Gord Stellick on April 28, 1988, who was replaced by Floyd Smith on August 15, 1989. Coaching was similarly shuffled often after Nielson's departure. Imlach's first choice for coach was his former player Smith, although he did not finish the 1979–80 season after being hospitalized by a car accident on March 14, 1980. Joe Crozier was named the new head coach until January 10, 1981, when he was succeeded by Mike Nykoluk. Nykoluk was head coach until April 2, 1984. Dan Maloney returned as head coach from 1984 to 1986, with John Brophy named head coach from 1986 to 1988. Both coaches had little success during their tenure. Doug Carpenter was named the new head coach to begin the 1989–90 season when the Leafs posted their first season above .500 in the decade.

The team did not have much success during the decade, missing the playoffs entirely in 1982, 1984 and 1985. On at least two occasions, they made the playoffs with the worst winning percentages on record for a playoff team. However, in those days, the top four teams in each division made the playoffs, regardless of record. Since the Norris only had five teams in total, this meant only the last-place team in the division missed the postseason. In 1985–86, for instance, they finished with a .356 winning percentage, the fourth worst in the league. However, due to playing in a Norris Division where no team cracked the 90-point mark, the Leafs still made the playoffs because Detroit had the worst record in the league. In 1987–88, they entered the final day of the season with the worst record in the league, but were only one point behind the Minnesota North Stars and thus were still in playoff contention. The Red Wings was the only team in the division with a winning record. However, the Leafs upset the Red Wings in their final game while the North Stars lost to the Flames hours later to hand the Leafs the final spot from the Norris.

The low finishes allowed the team to draft Wendel Clark first overall at the 1985 NHL entry draft. Clark managed to lead the Leafs to the playoffs from 1986 to 1988, as well as the 1990 playoffs. Ballard died on April 11, 1990.

=== Resurgence (1990–2004) ===
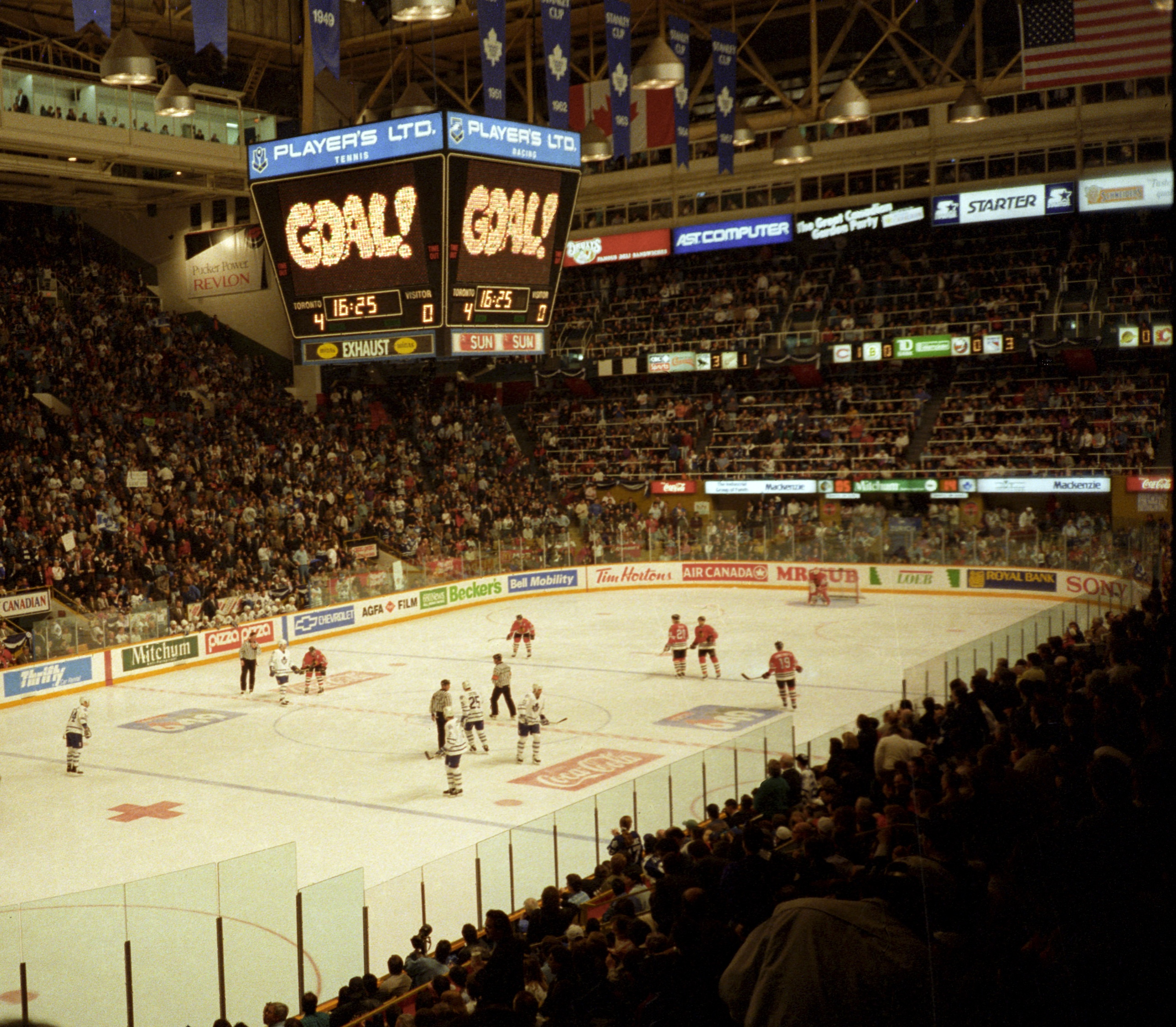
First game between the Leafs and Chicago Blackhawks during the 1994 Stanley Cup playoffs at Maple Leaf Gardens.

Don Crump, Don Giffin, and Steve Stavro were named executors of Ballard's estate. Stavro succeeded Ballard as chairman of Maple Leaf Gardens Ltd. and governor of the Maple Leafs. Cliff Fletcher was hired by Giffin to be the new general manager, although this was opposed by Stavro, who told Fletcher that he wanted to appoint his own general manager.

Notwithstanding Stavro's initial reluctance with Fletcher's appointment, the Leafs' new ownership would soon earn a reputation for steering clear of exerting undue interference in hockey operations, in stark contrast to Ballard. Fletcher soon set about building a competitive club, hiring Pat Burns as the new coach, and making a series of trades and free-agent acquisitions, such as acquiring Doug Gilmour and Dave Andreychuk, which turned the Leafs into a contender. Assisted by stellar goaltending from minor league call-up Félix Potvin, the team posted a then-franchise-record 99 points.

During the 1993 playoffs, Toronto dispatched the Detroit Red Wings in seven games in the first round, then defeated the St. Louis Blues in another seven games in the division finals. Hoping to meet long-time rival Montreal (who was playing in the Wales Conference finals against the New York Islanders) in the Cup Final, the Leafs faced the Los Angeles Kings in the Campbell Conference finals. They led the series 3–2 but dropped game six in Los Angeles. The game was not without controversy, as Wayne Gretzky clipped Gilmour in the face with his stick, but referee Kerry Fraser did not call a penalty, and Gretzky scored the winning goal moments later. The Leafs eventually lost in game seven 5–4.

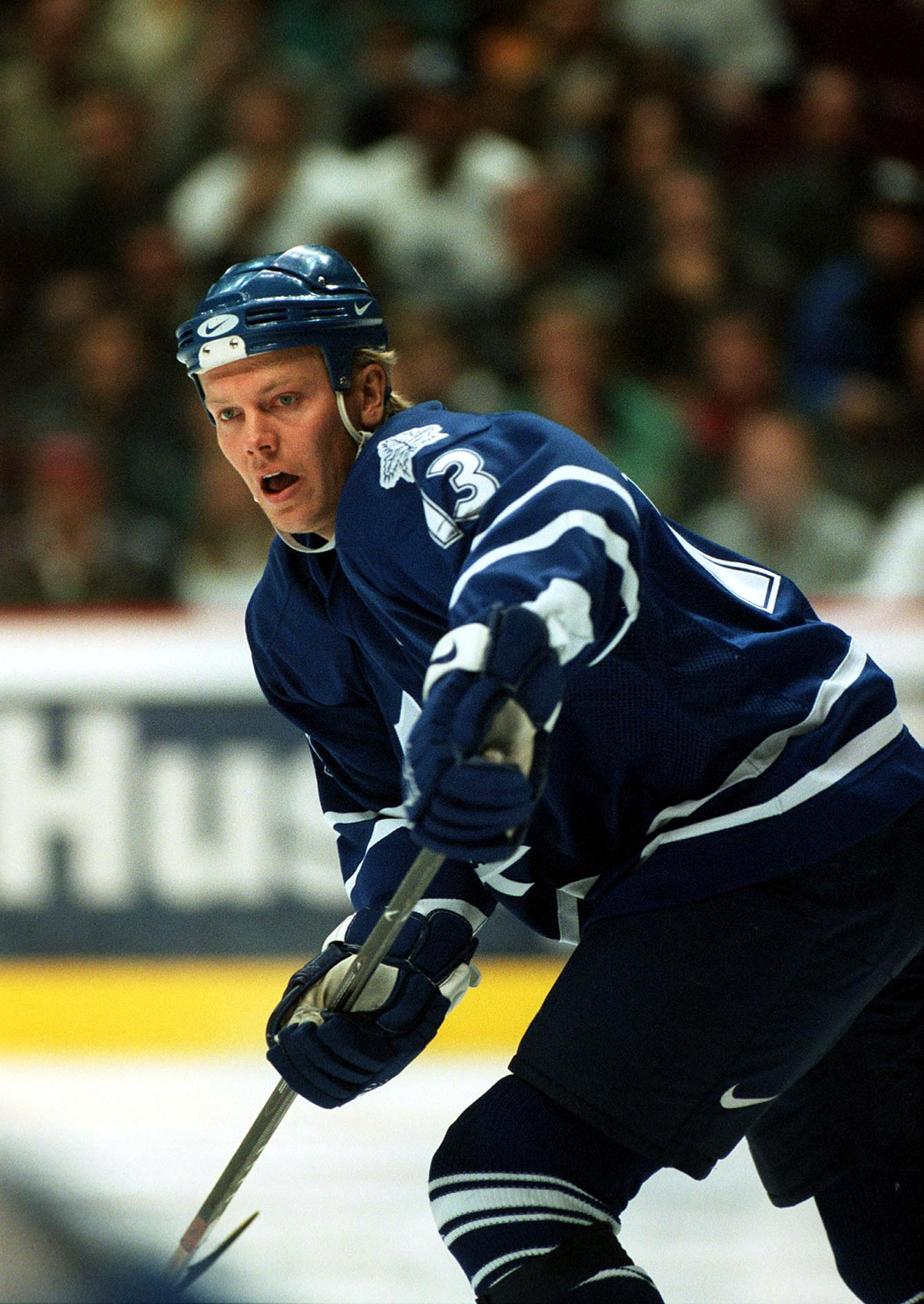
Mats Sundin in October 1997, shortly after being named captain of the Leafs after the Doug Gilmour trade to the New Jersey Devils.

The Leafs had another strong season in 1993–94, starting the season on a ten-game winning streak, and finishing it with 98 points. The team made it to the conference finals again, only to be eliminated by the Vancouver Canucks in five games. At the 1994 NHL entry draft, the Leafs packaged Wendel Clark in a multi-player trade with the Quebec Nordiques that landed them Mats Sundin. After the Leafs traded Gilmour to the New Jersey Devils in 1997, Sundin was named captain. Missing two consecutive playoffs in 1997 and 1998, the Leafs relieved Fletcher as general manager.

==== New home and a new millennium (1998–2004) ====
On February 12, 1998, Maple Leaf Gardens Ltd. (MLGL) purchased the Toronto Raptors, a National Basketball Association franchise, and the arena the Raptors were building, from Allan Slaight and Scotiabank. With the acquisition, MLGL was renamed Maple Leaf Sports & Entertainment (MLSE), acting as the parent company of the two teams. Larry Tanenbaum was a driving force in the acquisition, having bought a 12.5 per cent stake in MLGL in 1996.

Curtis Joseph was acquired as the team's starting goalie, while Pat Quinn was hired as the head coach before the 1998–99 season. Realigning the NHL's conferences in 1998, the Leafs were moved from the Western to the Eastern Conference. On February 13, 1999, the Leafs played their final game at the Gardens before moving to their new home at the then-Air Canada Centre. In the 1999 playoffs, the team advanced to the conference finals but lost in five games to the Buffalo Sabres.

In the 1999–2000 season, the Leafs hosted the 50th NHL All-Star Game. By the end of the season, they recorded their first 100-point season and won their first division title in 37 years. In both the 2000 and 2001 playoffs, the Leafs defeated the Ottawa Senators in the first round and lost to the New Jersey Devils in the second round. In the 2002 playoffs, the Leafs dispatched the Islanders and the Senators in seven games each during the first two rounds, only to lose to the Cinderella-story Carolina Hurricanes in six games in the conference finals. The 2001–02 season was particularly impressive in that injuries sidelined many of the Leafs' better players, but the efforts of depth players, including Alyn McCauley, Gary Roberts and Darcy Tucker, led them to the conference finals.

As Joseph opted to become a free agent during the 2002 off-season, the Leafs signed Ed Belfour as the new starting goaltender. Belfour played well during the 2002–03 season and was a finalist for the Vezina Trophy. The Leafs lost to Philadelphia in seven games during the first round of the 2003 playoffs. In 2003, an ownership change occurred in MLSE. Stavro sold his controlling interest in MLSE to the Ontario Teachers' Pension Plan (OTPP) and resigned his position as chairman in favour of Tanenbaum. Quinn remained as head coach but was replaced as general manager by John Ferguson Jr.

Before the 2003–04 season, the team held their training camp in Sweden and played in the NHL Challenge against teams from Sweden and Finland. The Leafs went on to enjoy a very successful regular season, leading the NHL at the time of the All-Star Game (with Quinn named head coach of the East's All-Star Team). They finished the season with a then-franchise-record 103 points. They finished with the fourth-best record in the League, and their highest overall finish in 41 years, achieving a .628 win percentage, their best in 43 years, and third-best in franchise history. In the 2004 playoffs, the Leafs defeated the Senators in the first round of the postseason for the fourth time in five years, with Belfour posting three shutouts in seven games, but lost to the Flyers in six games during the second round.

=== After the lockout (2005–2014) ===
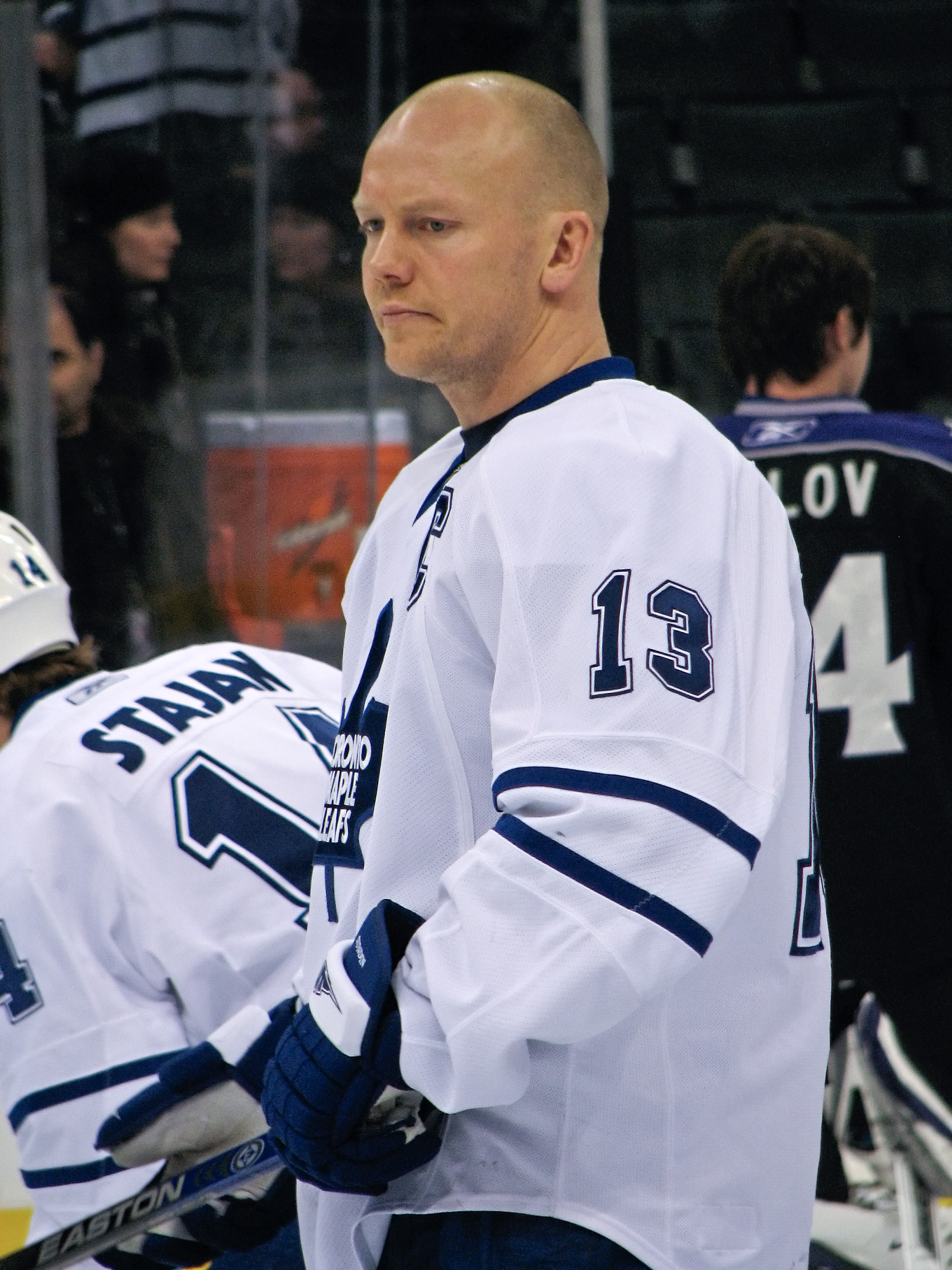
Mats Sundin in 2008 during his last season with the Maple Leafs.

Following the 2004–05 NHL lockout, the Maple Leafs experienced their longest playoff drought in the team's history. They struggled in the 2005–06 season; despite a late-season surge (9–1–2 in their final 12 games), led by goaltender Jean-Sébastien Aubin, Toronto was out of playoff contention for the first time since 1998. This marked the first time the team had missed the postseason under Quinn, who was later relieved as head coach. Quinn's dismissal was controversial since many of the young players who were key contributors to the Leafs' late-season run had been drafted by him before Ferguson's arrival, while Ferguson's signings (Jason Allison, Belfour, Alexander Khavanov, and Eric Lindros) had suffered season-ending injuries.

Paul Maurice, who had previously coached the inaugural season of the Maple Leafs' Toronto Marlies farm team, was named as Quinn's replacement. On June 30, 2006, the Leafs bought out fan-favourite Tie Domi's contract. The team also decided against picking up the option year on goaltender Ed Belfour's contract; he became a free agent. However, despite the coaching change, as well as a shuffle in the roster, the team did not make the playoffs in 2006–07. During the 2007–08 season, John Ferguson Jr. was fired in January 2008 and replaced by former Leafs' general manager Cliff Fletcher on an interim basis. The team retained Toronto-based sports lawyer Gord Kirke to begin a search for a new team president and general manager, and negotiate a contract. The Leafs did not qualify for the postseason, marking the first time since 1928 the team had failed to make the playoffs for three consecutive seasons. It was also Sundin's last year with the Leafs, as his contract was due to expire at the end of the season. However, he refused Leafs management's request to waive his no-trade clause for the team to rebuild by acquiring prospects or draft picks. On May 7, 2008, after the 2007–08 season, the Leafs fired Maurice, as well as assistant coach Randy Ladouceur, naming Ron Wilson as the new head coach, and Tim Hunter and Rob Zettler as assistant coaches.

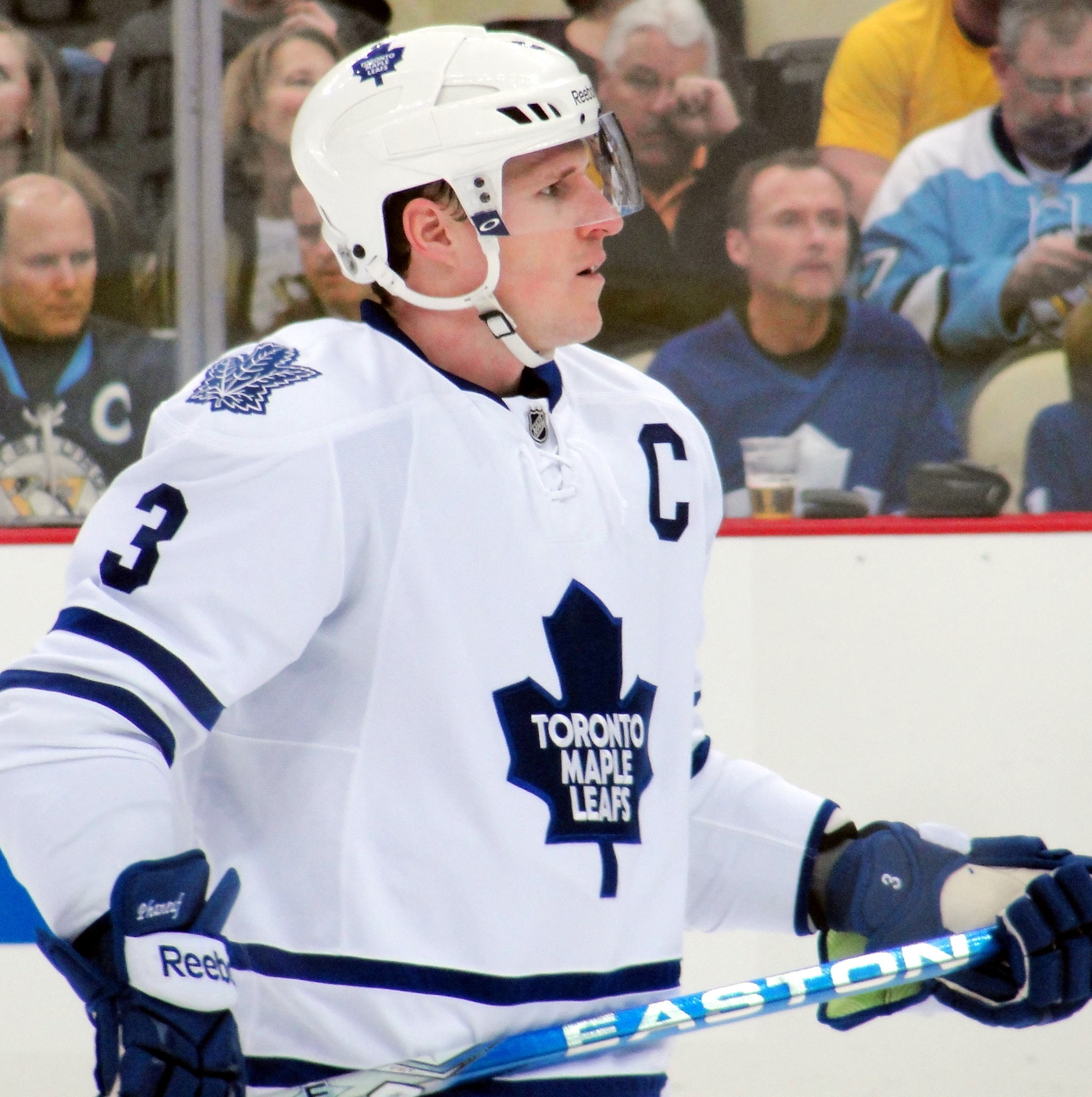
Dion Phaneuf was named team captain in the 2010 off-season and served that role until he was traded to Ottawa in 2016.

On November 29, 2008, the Maple Leafs hired Brian Burke as their 13th non-interim, and the first American, general manager in team history. The acquisition ended the second Cliff Fletcher era and settled persistent rumours that Burke was coming to Toronto. On June 26, 2009, Burke made his first appearance as the Leafs GM at the 2009 NHL entry draft, selecting London Knights forward Nazem Kadri with the seventh overall pick. On September 18, 2009, Burke traded Toronto's first- and second-round 2010, as well as its 2011 first-round picks, to the Boston Bruins in exchange for forward Phil Kessel. On January 31, 2010, the Leafs made another high-profile trade, this time with the Calgary Flames in a seven-player deal that brought defenceman Dion Phaneuf to Toronto. On June 14, during the off-season, the Leafs named Phaneuf captain after two seasons without one following Sundin's departure. On February 18, 2011, the team traded long-time Maple Leafs defenceman Tomáš Kaberle to the Bruins in exchange for prospect Joe Colborne, Boston's first-round pick in 2011, and a conditional second-round draft choice.

On March 2, 2012, Burke fired Wilson and named Randy Carlyle the new head coach. However, the termination proved to be controversial as Wilson had received a contract extension just two months before being let go. Changes at the ownership level also occurred in August 2012, when the OTPP completed the sale of their shares in MLSE to BCE Inc. and Rogers Communications. On January 9, 2013, Burke was fired as general manager, and replaced by Dave Nonis. In their first full season under the leadership of Carlyle, Toronto managed to secure a playoff berth in the 2012–13 season (which was shortened again due to another lock-out) for the first time in eight years. However, the Leafs lost in seven games to eventual 2013 Stanley Cup finalist Boston in the first round. Despite the season's success, it was not repeated during the 2013–14 season, as the Leafs failed to make the playoffs.

=== Brendan Shanahan era (2014–2025) ===
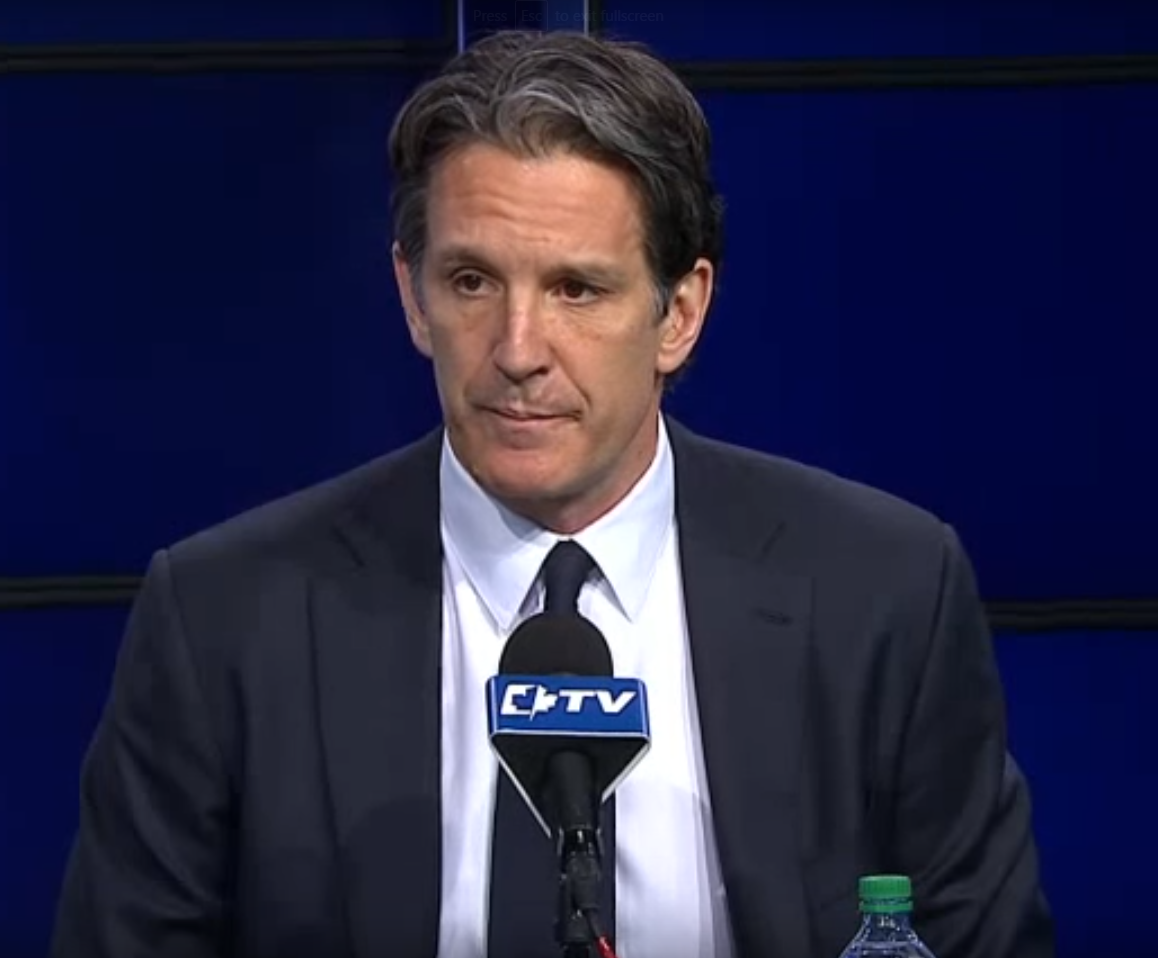
Brendan Shanahan was named the president and an alternate governor of the club in April 2014.

Following the 2013–14 regular season, Brendan Shanahan was named as the president and an alternate governor of the Maple Leafs. On January 6, 2015, the Leafs fired Randy Carlyle as head coach, and assistant coach Peter Horachek took over on an interim basis immediately. While the Leafs had a winning record before Carlyle's firing, the team eventually collapsed. On February 6, 2015, the Leafs set a new franchise record of 11 consecutive games without a win. At the beginning of February, Shanahan gained the approval of MLSE's board of directors to begin a "scorched earth" rebuild of the club. Both Dave Nonis and Horachek were relieved of their duties on April 12, just one day after the season concluded. In addition, the Leafs also fired several assistant coaches, including Steve Spott and Rick St. Croix, as well as individuals from the Leafs' player scouting department.

On May 20, 2015, Mike Babcock was named as the new head coach, and on July 23, Lou Lamoriello was named the 16th general manager in team history. On July 1, 2015, the Leafs packaged Kessel in a multi-player deal to the Pittsburgh Penguins in return for three skaters, including Kasperi Kapanen, a conditional first-round pick, and a third-round pick. Toronto also retained $1.2 million of Kessel's salary for the remaining seven seasons of his contract. During the following season, on February 9, 2016, the Leafs packaged Phaneuf in another multi-player deal, acquiring four players, as well as a 2017 second-round pick from the Ottawa Senators. The team finished last in the NHL for the first time since the 1984–85 season. They subsequently won the draft lottery and used the first overall pick to draft Auston Matthews.

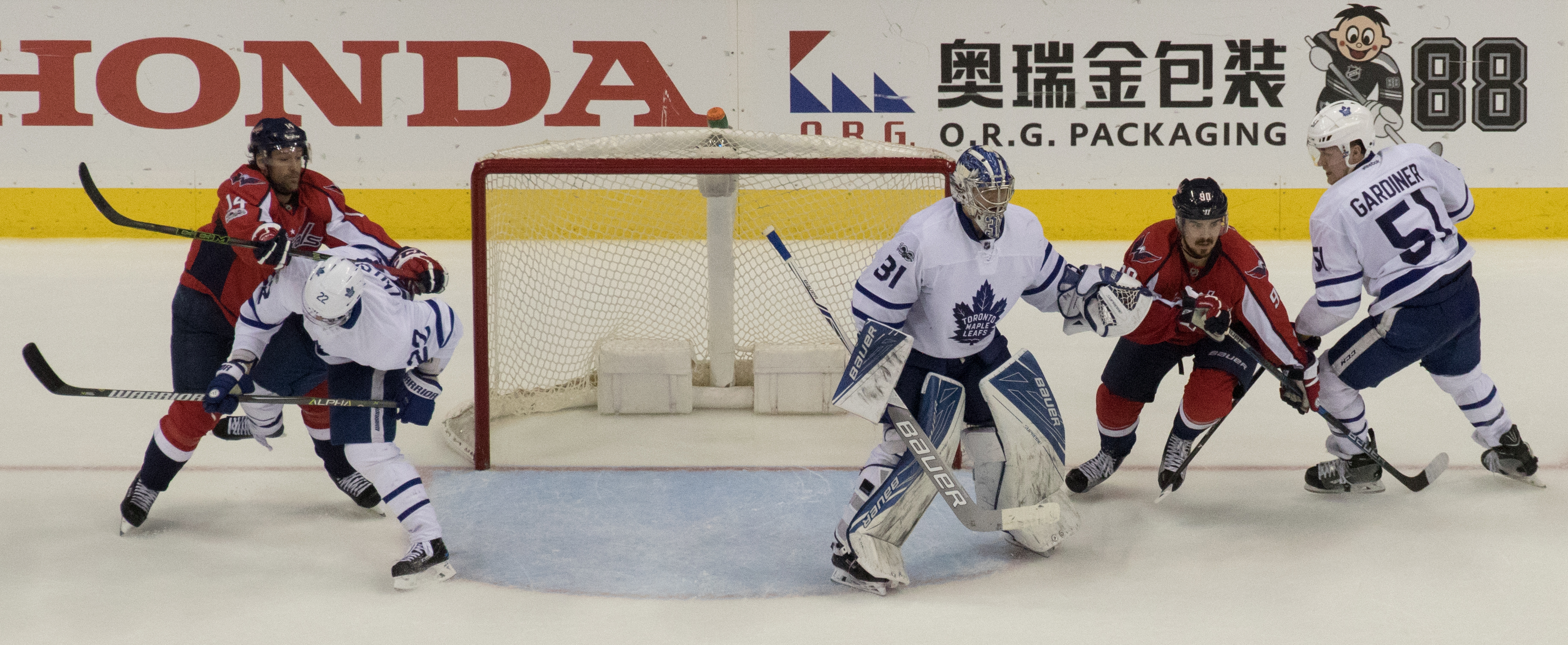
The Maple Leafs faced the Washington Capitals in the first round of the 2017 playoffs.

In their second season under Babcock, Toronto secured the final Eastern Conference wildcard spot for the 2017 playoffs. On April 23, 2017, the Maple Leafs were eliminated from the playoffs by the top-seeded Washington Capitals four games to two in the best-of-seven series.

Toronto finished the 2017–18 season with 105 points by beating Montreal 4–2 in their final game of the regular season, a franchise-record, beating the previous record of 103 points set in 2004. They faced the Boston Bruins in the first round and lost in seven games. Following the playoffs, Lamoriello was not renewed as general manager. Kyle Dubas was subsequently named the team's 17th general manager in May 2018. During the 2018 off-season, the Maple Leafs signed John Tavares to a seven-year, $77 million contract. On April 1, the Maple Leafs clinched a division berth for the 2019 Stanley Cup playoffs. The Maple Leafs were eliminated in the first round of the 2019 playoffs on April 23, after losing to the Bruins in a seven-game series.

On October 2, 2019, Tavares was named as the team's 25th team captain prior to the Leafs' 2019–20 season opening game. After a 9–10–4 start to the 2019–20 season, the club relieved Babcock as head coach on November 20, with Sheldon Keefe named as his replacement. The Maple Leafs were eliminated in the 2020 Stanley Cup Qualifiers on August 9, after losing a five-game series against the Columbus Blue Jackets.

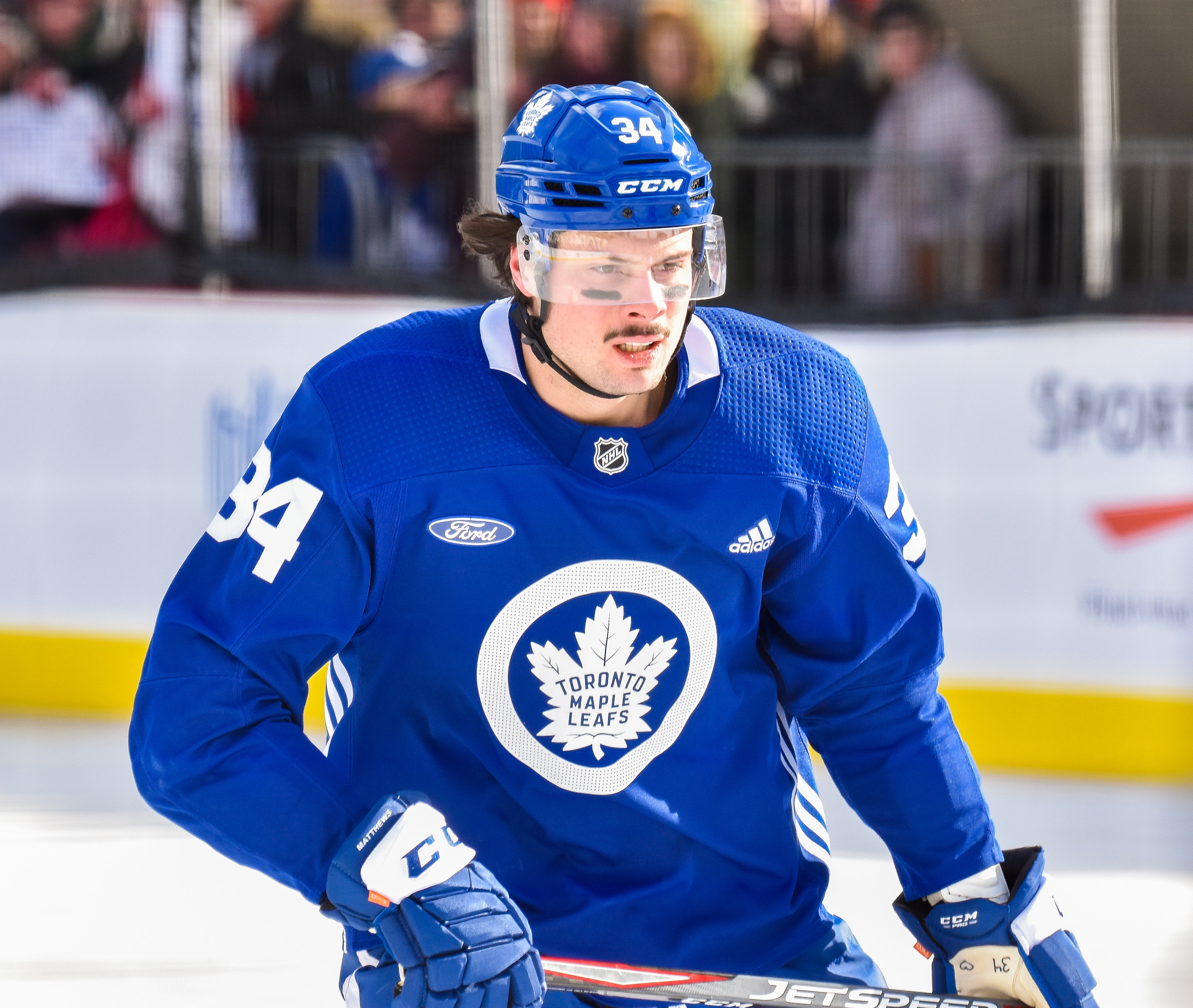
Auston Matthews, wearing eye blacks, during an outdoor practice with the Maple Leafs at Nathan Phillips Square, January 2020.

Due to the COVID-19 pandemic and travel restrictions at the Canada–United States border, the Leafs were temporarily moved to the North Division for the 2020–21 season alongside the NHL's other Canadian teams. During that season, teams only played games against teams in their divisions, in a limited 56-game season. On May 8, 2021, the Leafs clinched the North Division title, giving the Leafs guaranteed home advantage in the first two rounds of the 2021 Stanley Cup playoffs. Matthews also led the league in goals with 41 goals, becoming the first Maple Leaf to win the Maurice "Rocket" Richard Trophy. However, the Leafs lost in the first round to their rivals, the Montreal Canadiens, with the Leafs squandering a 3–1 series lead in the process.

Despite the ending to the previous season, the Leafs were poised to make another run, with much of the core roster intact. Aided by the arrival of defenceman Mark Giordano and centre Colin Blackwell from the Seattle Kraken on March 21, the team cruised throughout the regular season. The Maple Leafs broke their franchise record for points in a season, with 115, and wins in a season, with 50, during a 4–2 victory over the New York Islanders on April 17. Despite the achievement, they were unable to match the league-leading Florida Panthers', finishing second in the Atlantic Division During the season, Matthews became the first Leaf in a decade to score 60 goals in a season, and was awarded the Hart Memorial Trophy. The Leafs made the playoffs but lost in the first round to the Tampa Bay Lightning in seven games. With this loss, the Maple Leafs became the first team in the four major North American sports leagues to lose five consecutive winner-take-all games.

The 2022 off-season saw the departure of the Leafs' goalie tandem, Jack Campbell and Petr Mrázek, the former signing with Edmonton, the latter being traded to the Blackhawks during the 2022 NHL entry draft. Needing a goaltender tandem for the upcoming season, the Leafs acquired Matt Murray through a trade with the Senators, and signed free agent Ilya Samsonov.

During the 2022–23 NHL season, the Leafs again fared well in the regular season, achieving an excellent 50–21–11 record and 111 points, one point less than the record achieved the season prior. However, the record-setting 2022–23 Boston Bruins led the division, finishing with 135 points, and leaving the Leafs in second place in the Atlantic. In the first round of the playoffs, the Leafs defeated the Lightning in a six-game series, marking the first time the Maple Leafs advanced to the second round of the playoff appearance since 2004. During the series with the Lightning, the Leafs became the first NHL team to win three road playoff games in overtime. However, the Leafs lost to the Florida Panthers in the second round in five games. Following the loss, Dubas' contract as general manager was not renewed with the club for the 2023–24 season. Dubas was then replaced by Brad Treliving on May 31.

In 2023–24, the team finished with a 46–26–10 record, good for 102 points and the third seed in the Atlantic Division. Matthews broke his own career and franchise records for goals in a season, with 69, and was awarded his third Rocket Richard Trophy. However, they were again eliminated in the first round of the playoffs, falling to the Bruins in seven games. After the season, Keefe was dismissed as head coach on May 9, with Craig Berube hired as his successor on May 17. That off-season, Tavares relinquished his role as captain to Matthews on August 14, 2024, with the latter becoming the 26th overall and first American-born captain in franchise history.

The team finished the 2024–25 season with a 52–26–4 record, topping the Atlantic Division with 108 points, their first division championship in the Atlantic, setting up a Battle of Ontario matchup with the wild card Ottawa Senators in the first round of the 2025 playoffs. In doing so, Berube broke the record for most wins for a Maple Leafs coach in his first season, previously held by Pat Quinn, who had 45 in the 1998–99 season. The Leafs defeated the Senators in a six-game series. As with the 2023 Stanley Cup playoffs, the Leafs faced the Florida Panthers in the second round of the playoffs. The Leafs' goaltender Anthony Stolarz was injured in game one and was replaced with Joseph Woll for the remainder of the series. Toronto subsequently lost the series to the Panthers, who would go on to win the Stanley Cup, in seven games.

=== Post-Shanahan era (2025–present) ===
Shortly after the end of Toronto's 2025 playoffs, the team announced that Shanahan would not return as team president and alternate governor.

During the 2025 off-season, the Leafs traded Mitch Marner to the Vegas Golden Knights for Nicolas Roy, who would be later be traded to the Colorado Avalanche at the trade deadline for draft picks. On March 30, 2026, general manager Brad Treliving was fired. The team would end up finishing the 2025–26 season with a 32–36–14 record with 78 points, finishing last in the Atlantic Division, and missing the playoffs for the first time since the 2015–16 season.

Gavin McKenna, depicted as a member of the Penn State Nittany Lions, was drafted first by the Leafs in 2026.

On May 3, 2026, the Maple Leafs announced the hiring of John Chayka as their general manager, replacing Treliving, and former team captain Mats Sundin as senior executive advisor of hockey operations. Two days later, the Maple Leafs won the 2026 NHL draft lottery and won the first overall pick in the draft, which they used to select winger Gavin McKenna. On May 13, the Leafs fired Berube as head coach. He was replaced by Jim Hiller on June 17.

== Team culture ==
=== Fan base ===
The price of a Maple Leafs home game ticket is the highest amongst any team in the NHL. Scotiabank Arena holds 18,819 seats for Leafs games, with 15,500 reserved for season ticket holders. Because of the demand for season tickets, their sale is limited to the 10,000 people on the waiting list. As of March 2016, Leafs' season tickets saw a renewal rate of 99.5 per cent, a rate that would require more than 250 years to clear the existing waiting list. In a 2014 survey by ESPN The Magazine, the Leafs were ranked last out of the 122 professional teams in the Big Four leagues. Teams were graded by stadium experience, ownership, player quality, ticket affordability, championships won and "bang for the buck"; in particular, the Leafs came last in ticket affordability.

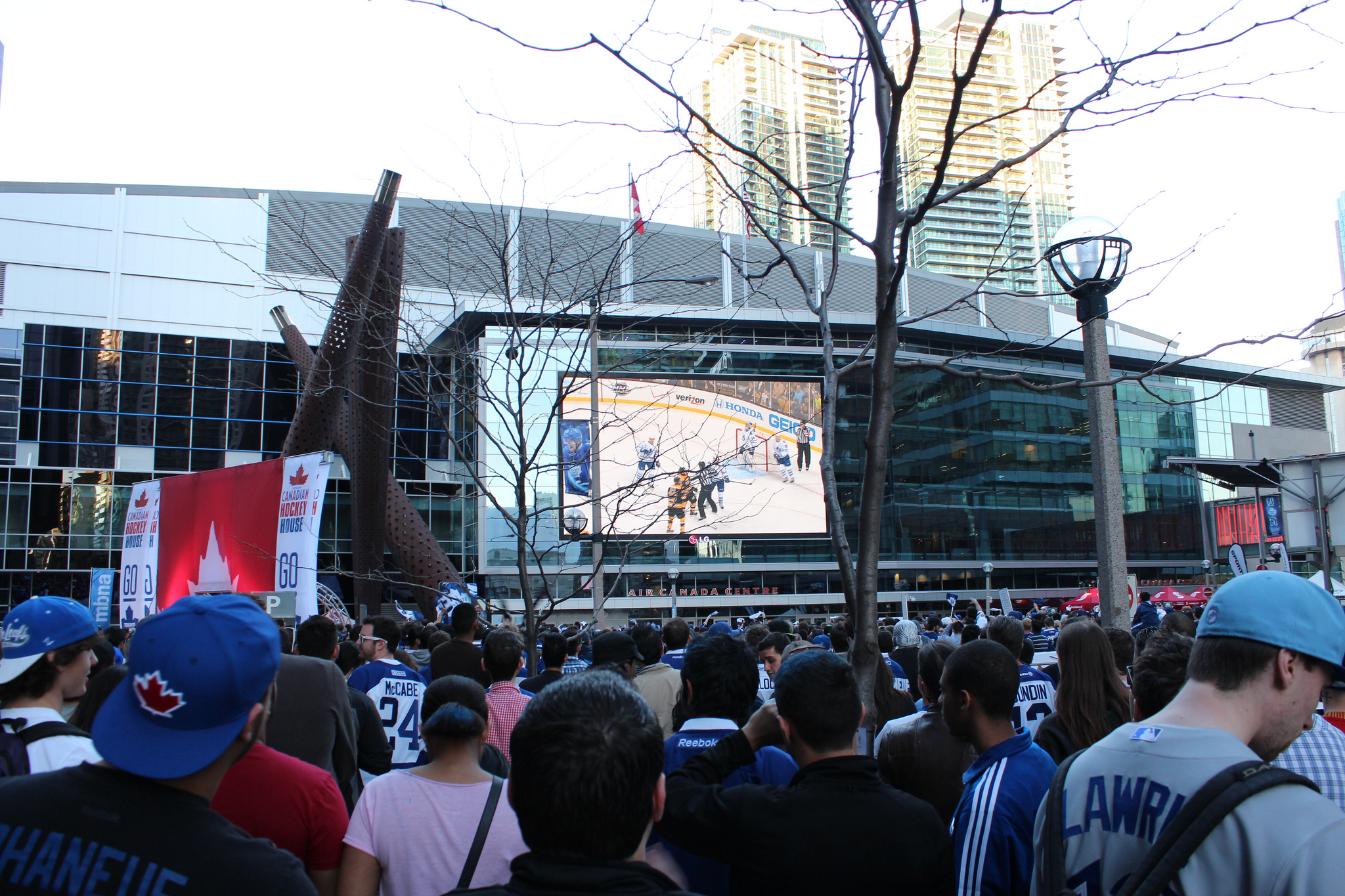
Fans gather at Maple Leaf Square to watch Game Two between the Maple Leafs and the Boston Bruins during the 2013 Stanley Cup playoffs.

Leafs fans are known for their dedicated support and notable loyalty to the team despite their performance. They are considered to have the largest fan base in the NHL. In a study conducted by sports retailer Fanatics in March 2017, the Leafs and the Minnesota Wild were the only two NHL teams to average arena sellouts despite a below league average winning percentage. Conversely, fans of other teams harbour an equally passionate dislike of the team. In November 2002, the Leafs were named by Sports Illustrated hockey writer Michael Farber as the "Most Hated Team in Hockey".

Despite their loyalty, there have been several instances where the fanbase voiced their displeasure with the club. During the 2011–12 season, fans attending the games chanted for the dismissal of head coach Ron Wilson, and later general manager Brian Burke. Wilson was let go shortly after the fans' outburst, even though he had been given a contract extension months earlier. Burke alluded to the chants noting "it would be cruel and unusual punishment to let Ron coach another game in the Air Canada Centre". In the 2014–15 season, fans threw Leafs jerseys onto the ice to show their disapproval of the team's poor performances in the past few decades. Similarly, during the later portion of the 2015–16 season, which overlaps with the start of Major League Baseball's regular season of play, fans were heard sarcastically chanting "Let's go Blue Jays!" and clapping alongside the chant as a sign of their farcical shift in priority from an under-performing team to the more successful playoff-bound 2016 Toronto Blue Jays season. Leafs fans also vandalized Mike Babcock's Wikipedia article amid the poor records of the first few months into the 2019–20 season; his article was temporarily semi-protected to minimize further vandalism. (Note: A semi-protected Wikipedia page can only be edited by registered users who have made at least ten edits on Wikipedia in at least four days. This article itself, Toronto Maple Leafs, is semi-protected indefinitely due to persistent vandalism.)

In addition to the Greater Toronto Area (GTA), many fans live throughout Ontario, Quebec, including New York state and Michigan. As a result, Leafs' away games at the Bell Centre in Montreal, Canadian Tire Centre in Ottawa, KeyBank Center in Buffalo and at the Little Caesars Arena in Detroit hold more of a shared crowd. This is due in part to the Leafs fans in those areas, and those cities' proximity to the GTA.

The Leafs are also a popular team in Atlantic Canada. In November 2016, a survey was conducted that found 20 per cent of respondents from Atlantic Canada viewed the Leafs as their favourite team, second only to the Montreal Canadiens at 26 per cent. The Leafs were found to be the most favoured team in Prince Edward Island, with 24 per cent of respondents favouring the Leafs; and the second favourite team in Nova Scotia and Newfoundland and Labrador (19 and 24 per cent respectively, both trailing respondents who favoured the Canadiens by one per cent).

=== Rivalries ===
"Montreal–Toronto was the traditional rivalry, Detroit–Toronto was the bitter rivalry."

— Bob Nevin

During the 25 years of the Original Six era (1942–67), teams played each other 14 times during the regular season, and with only four teams continuing into the playoffs, rivalries were intense. The Maple Leafs established several rivalries with other teams that played in this era, including the Boston Bruins, Detroit Red Wings, and the Montreal Canadiens. In addition to the aforementioned teams, the Maple Leafs have also developed a rivalry with the Ottawa Senators, as well as a minor geographic rivalry with the Buffalo Sabres called the Battle of the QEW after the Queen Elizabeth Way (QEW), the freeway that links Buffalo with Toronto along the western edge of Lake Ontario within the Golden Horseshoe.

==== Boston Bruins ====
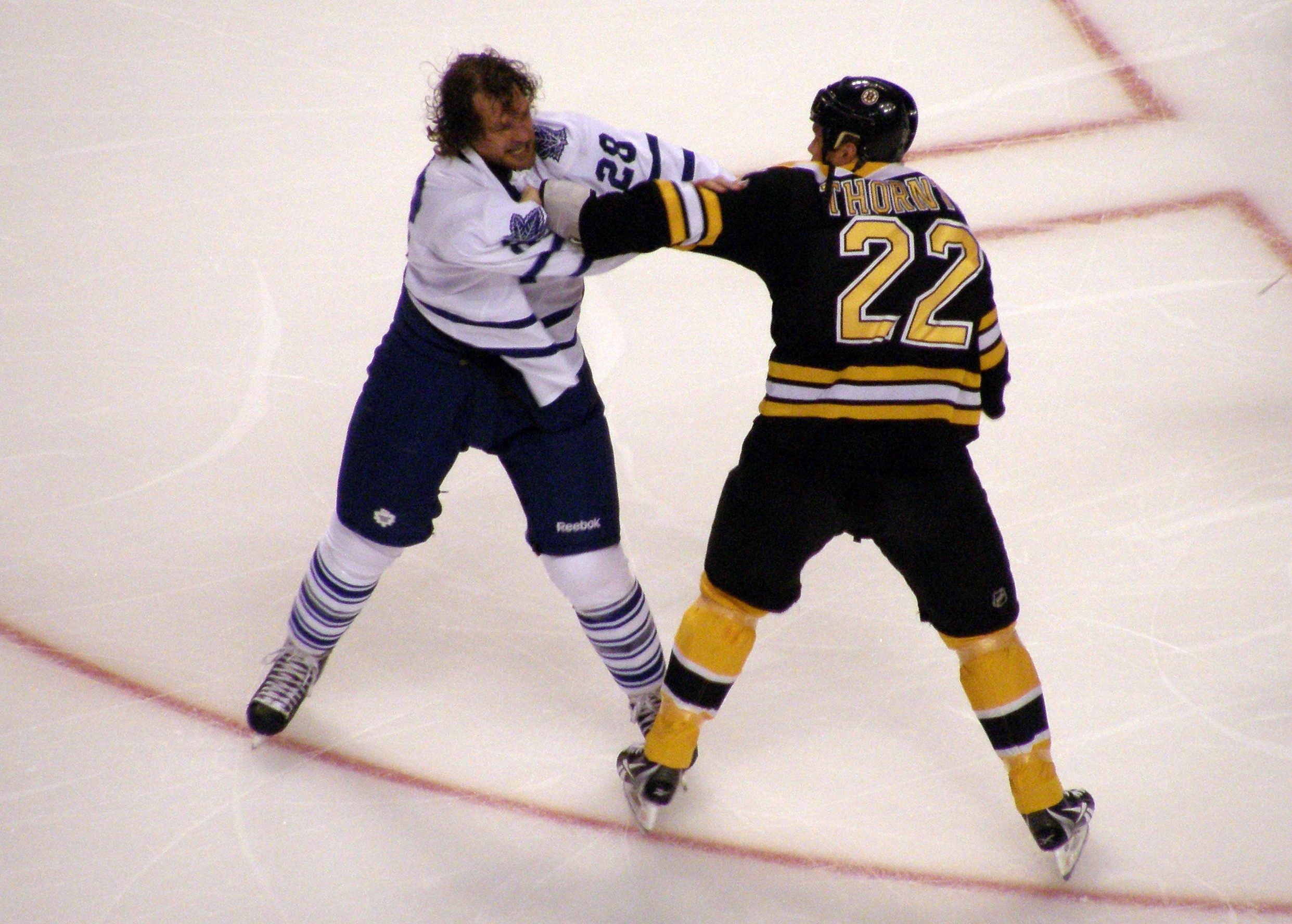
Maple Leafs' Colton Orr fights with Bruins' Shawn Thornton during a game, October 2011.

Both teams are Original Six teams, with their first game played in Boston's inaugural season on December 3, 1924. In the match-up, the St. Patricks earned a 5–3 victory against the Bruins at Mutual Street Arena. The Maple Leafs played their first Stanley Cup playoff series against the Bruins in 1933, winning the series 3–2. From 1933 to 2019, the two teams played in 16 postseason series against one another, including one Stanley Cup Final.

The rivalry has since been renewed from the 2013 Stanley Cup playoffs which saw the Bruins rally from a 4–1 third-period deficit to defeat the Maple Leafs in overtime, 5–4, and advance to the second round. In the 2018, 2019, and 2024 Stanley Cup playoffs, the Bruins would again defeat the Maple Leafs in seven games in all three of those years.

==== Buffalo Sabres ====
The rivalry between the Buffalo Sabres and Toronto Maple Leafs is due to the 100-mile (160 km) distance between their home arenas (KeyBank Center and Scotiabank Arena respectively). The Sabres won 70 of 103 all-time home games against the Maple Leafs from their inception in 1970–71 until 2015–16 (the last season before Toronto drafted Auston Matthews), despite the always large contingency of Toronto fans at those games. Since the 1998–99 season, both teams have played in the Northeast Division, now the Atlantic Division. Buffalo won the 1999 Eastern Conference finals against Toronto in five games, the only playoff series between the two teams. During the 2018–19 season, Toronto swept Buffalo in the season series for the first time ever. Buffalo previously swept a season series with Toronto in 1979–80, 1987–88, and 1991–92. Due in part to the number of Leafs fans living near or in Buffalo, and in part to Buffalo's relative proximity to Toronto and the rest of Ontario, as well as the lower prices of Sabres tickets, Maple Leafs–Sabres games at the KeyBank Center in Buffalo typically hold around 80 per cent of Leafs fans, making it the largest away crowd in the NHL.

==== Detroit Red Wings ====
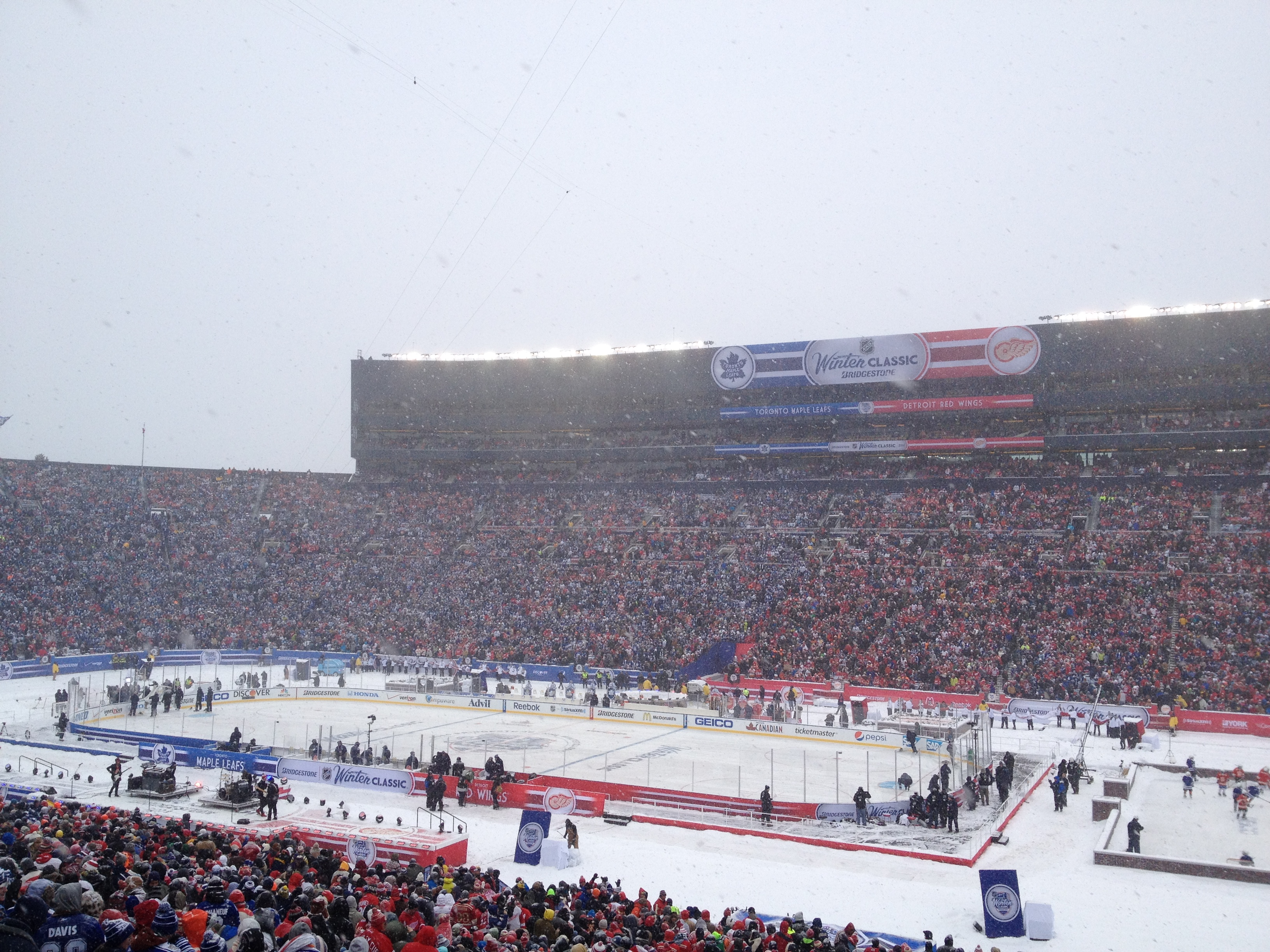
The Red Wings hosted the Maple Leafs at the 2014 NHL Winter Classic in Michigan Stadium in Ann Arbor, Michigan.

The Detroit Red Wings and the Maple Leafs are both Original Six teams, playing their first game together in 1927. From 1929 to 1993, the teams met each other in the 16 playoff series, as well as seven Stanley Cup Final. Meeting one another a combined 23 times in the postseason, they have played each other in more playoff series than any other two teams in NHL history except for the Bruins and Canadiens who have played a total of 34 playoff series against each other. Overlapping fanbases, particularly in markets such as Windsor, Ontario, and the surrounding Essex County, have added to the rivalry.

The rivalry between the Detroit Red Wings and the Maple Leafs was at its height during the Original Six era. The Leafs and Red Wings met in the playoffs six times during the 1940s, including four Stanley Cup Final series. The Leafs beat the Red Wings in five of their six meetings. In the 1950s, the Leafs and Red Wings met one another in six Stanley Cup semifinals; the Red Wings beat the Leafs in five of their six meetings. From 1961 to 1967, the two teams met one another in three playoff series, including two Stanley Cup Final. Within those 25 years, the Leafs and Red Wings played a total of 15 playoff series including six Cup Final; the Maple Leafs beat the Red Wings in all six Cup Final.

The teams have only met three times in the playoffs since the Original Six era, with their last meeting in 1993. After the Leafs moved to the Eastern Conference in 1998, they faced each other less often, and the rivalry began to stagnate. The rivalry became intradivisional once again in 2013 when Detroit was moved to the Atlantic Division of the Eastern Conference as part of a realignment. Due in part to the number of Leafs fans living near Detroit and in Michigan, and in part to Detroit's relative proximity to Toronto and the rest of Ontario, Maple Leafs–Red Wings games at the Little Caesars Arena in Detroit typically hold at least 40 per cent of Leafs fans.

==== Montreal Canadiens ====
The rivalry between the Montreal Canadiens and the Maple Leafs is the oldest in the NHL, featuring two clubs that were active since the inaugural NHL season in 1917. In the early 20th century, the rivalry was an embodiment of a larger culture war between English Canada and French Canada. The Canadiens have won 24 Stanley Cups, while the Maple Leafs have won 13, ranking them first and second for most Cup wins, respectively.

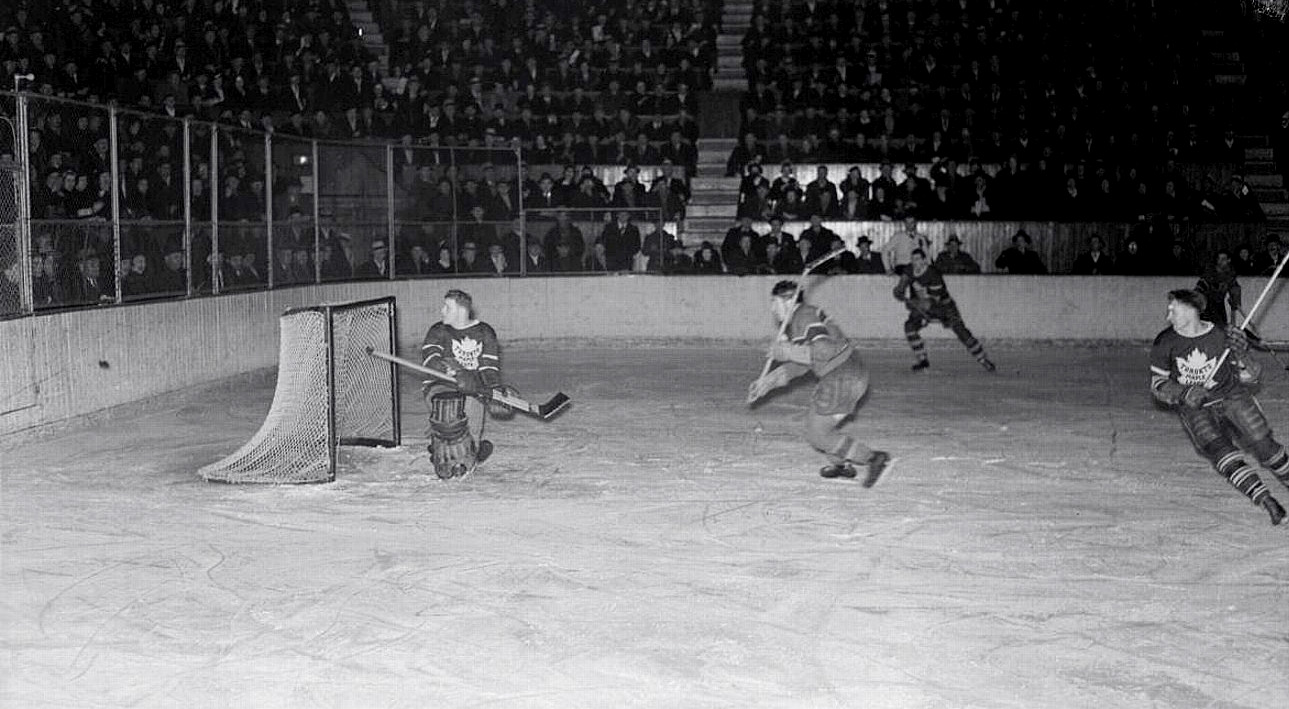
A game between the Canadiens and Maple Leafs in March 1938

The height of the rivalry was during the 1960s when the Canadiens and Leafs combined to win all but one Cup. The two clubs had 15 playoff meetings. However, the rivalry has waned with the two having not met in the postseason from 1979 to 2021. It also suffered when Montreal and Toronto were placed in opposite conferences in 1981, with the Leafs in the Clarence Campbell/Western Conference and the Canadiens in the Prince of Wales/Eastern Conference. The rivalry became intradivisional once again in 1998 when the Leafs were moved into the Eastern Conference's Northeast Division.

The rivalry's cultural imprint may be seen in literature and art. The rivalry from the perspective of the Canadiens fan is captured in the popular Canadian short story The Hockey Sweater by Roch Carrier. Originally published in French as "Une abominable feuille d'érable sur la glace" ("An abominable maple leaf on the ice"), it referred to the Maple Leafs sweater a mother forced her son to wear. The son is presumably based on Carrier himself when he was young. This rivalry is also evident in Toronto's College subway station, which displays murals depicting the two teams, one on each platform (the Leafs mural being on the southbound platform), given that when the murals were installed in 1984, the station was the closest to the Leafs' then-home of Maple Leaf Gardens. Due in part to the large population of Leafs fans living near or in Montreal, and in part to Montreal's relative proximity to Toronto and the rest of Ontario, Maple Leafs–Canadiens games at the Bell Centre in Montreal typically hold a significant amount of Leafs fans.

==== Ottawa Senators ====
The modern Ottawa Senators entered the NHL in 1992, but the rivalry between the two teams did not begin to emerge until the late 1990s. From 1992 to 1998, Ottawa and Toronto played in different conferences (Prince of Wales / Eastern and Clarence Campbell / Western respectively), which meant they rarely played each other. However, before the 1998–99 season, the conferences and divisions were realigned, with Toronto moved to the Eastern Conference's Northeast Division with Ottawa. From 2000 to 2004, the teams played four postseason series; the Leafs won all four playoff series. Due in part to the number of Leafs fans living near or in Ottawa, and in part to Ottawa's relative proximity to Toronto, Maple Leafs–Senators games at the Canadian Tire Centre in Ottawa typically hold more Leafs fans rather than Sens fans, leading to fan chant exchanges with Leafs fans chanting "Go Leafs Go!" and Sens fans chanting "Leafs Suck!" with each chant alternating.

== Team operations ==
=== Branding ===
==== Logo and uniform ====
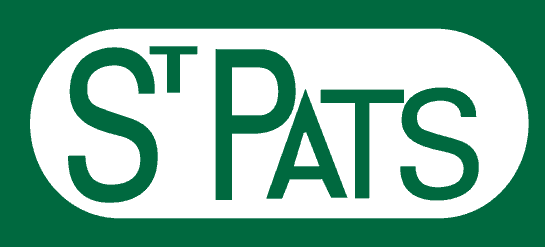
Former logos used by the franchise (from left to right: Arenas logo used from 1917 to 1918; the St. Patricks logo used from 1922 to 1925).

The team is represented through several images and symbols, including the maple leaf logo found on the club's uniform. The Maple Leafs' jersey has a long history and is one of the best-selling NHL jerseys among fans. The club's uniforms have been altered several times. The club's first uniforms were blue and featured the letter T. The first major alteration came in 1919 when the club was renamed the St. Patricks. The uniforms were green with "Toronto St. Pats" on the logo, lettered in green either on a white "pill" shape or stripes.

When the club was renamed the Maple Leafs in the 1927–28 season, the logo was changed, and the team reverted to blue uniforms. The logo was a 48-point maple leaf with the words lettered in white. The home jersey was blue with alternating thin-thick stripes on the arms, legs and shoulders. The road uniform was white with three stripes on the chest and back, waist and legs. For 1933–34, the alternating thin-thick stripes were replaced with stripes of equal thickness. This remained the basic design for the next 40 years. In 1937, veins were added to the leaf and "Toronto" curved downwards at the ends instead of upwards. In 1942, the 35-point leaf was introduced. In 1946, the logo added trimming to the leaf with a white or blue border, while "C" for captain and "A" for alternate captain first appeared on the sweaters. In 1947, the "Toronto Maple Leafs" lettering was in red for a short time. In 1958, a six-eyelet lace and tie were added to the neck and a blue shoulder yoke was added. In 1961, player numbers were added to the sleeves.

Logo for the Maple Leafs from 1963 to 1967. The logo was later used as an alternate logo for the Maple Leafs (1992–2000; 2008–2016).

The fourth major change came in the 1966–67 season when the logo was changed to an 11-point leaf, similar to the leaf on the then-new flag of Canada to commemorate the Canadian Centennial. The simpler leaf logo featured the Futura Display typeface, replacing the previous block letters. The stripes on the sleeves and waistline were also changed, adding a wider stripe in between the two thinner stripes (similar to the stripe patterns on the socks and the early Leafs sweaters). Before the 1970–71 season, the Leafs adopted a new 11-point leaf logo, with a Kabel bold-font "Toronto" going straight across, running parallel to the other words. Other changes to the sweater included the replacement of the arm strips with an elongated yoke that extended to the ends of the sleeves, a solid single stripe on the waist replacing the three waistline stripes, two stripes on the stockings, and a smaller, textless Leaf crest on the shoulders. In 1973, the jersey's neck was a lace tie-down design, before the V-neck returned in 1976. In 1977, the NHL rules were changed to require names on the backs of the uniforms, but Harold Ballard resisted the change. Under Ballard's direction, the team briefly "complied" with the rule by placing blue letters on the blue road jersey for a game on February 26, 1978. With the NHL threatening hefty fines for failing to comply with the spirit of the rule (namely, having the names be legible for the fans and broadcasters in attendance), Ballard reached a compromise with the league, allowing the Leafs to finish the 1977–78 season with contrasting white letters on the road sweaters, and coming into full compliance with the new rule in the 1978–79 season by adding names in blue to the white home sweaters.

With the NHL's 75th anniversary season (1991–92 season), the Leafs wore "Original Six" style uniforms similar to the designs used in the 1940s. Because of the fan reaction to the previous season's classic uniforms, the first changes to the Maple Leafs uniform in over 20 years were made. The revised uniforms for 1992–93 featured two stripes on the sleeves and waistline like the classic uniform, but with the 1970 11-point leaf with Kabel text on the front. A vintage-style veined leaf crest was placed on the shoulders. The uniforms would undergo a few modifications over the years.

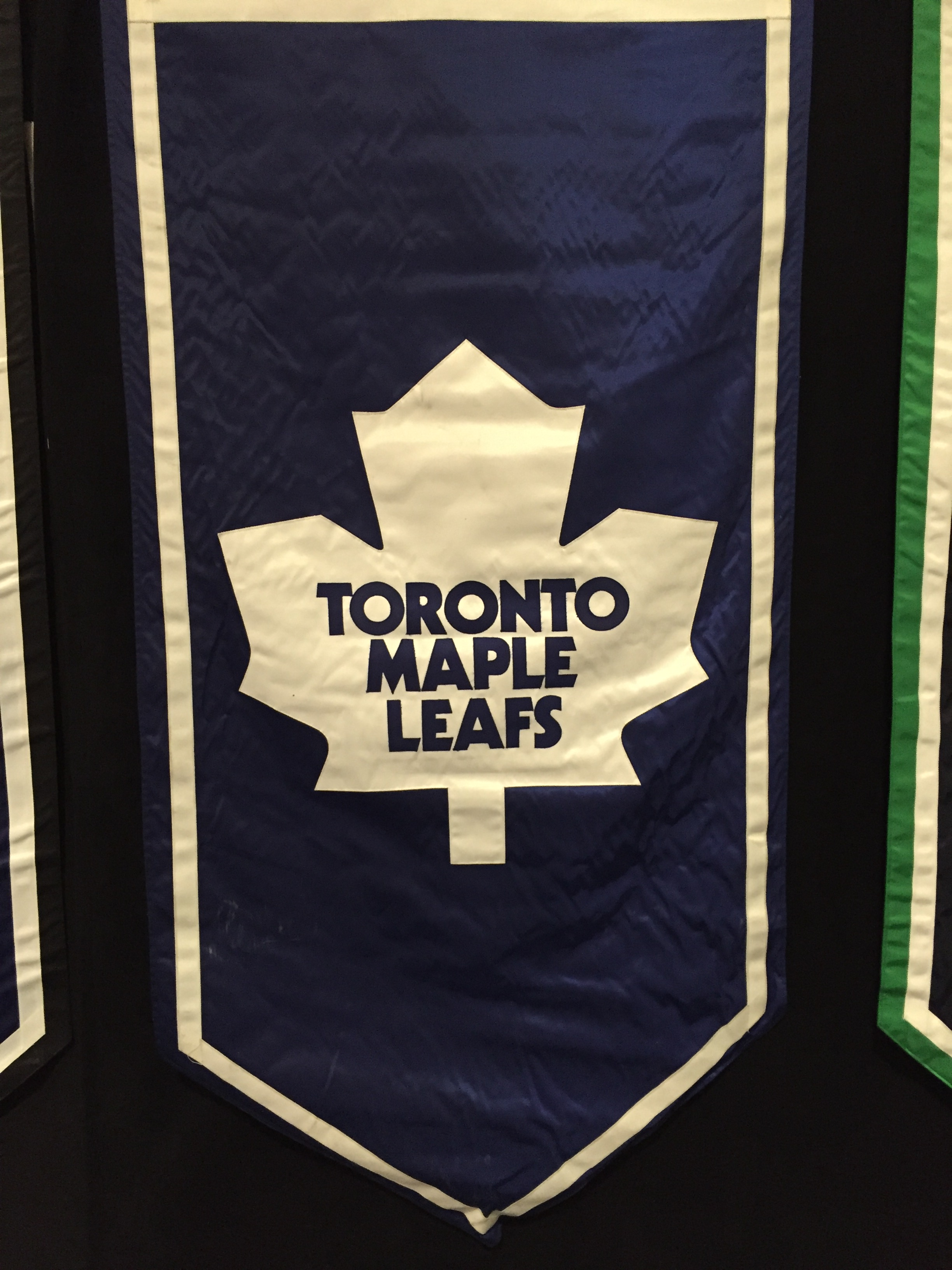
Maple Leafs banner at the 2016 NHL All-Star Game. The 11-point leaf logo was used as the primary team logo from 1970 to 2016.

In 1997, Nike acquired the rights to manufacture Maple Leafs uniforms. Construction changes to the uniform included a wishbone collar and pothole mesh underarms, while the player name and number font were changed to Kabel to match the logo. CCM returned to manufacturing the Leafs uniforms in 1999 when Nike withdrew from the hockey jersey market, and kept most of the changes, although in 2000 the Kabel numbers were replaced with block numbers outlined in silver, and a silver-outlined interlocked TML monogram replaced the vintage leaf on the shoulders. Also during this time, the Leafs began wearing a white 1960s-style throwback third jersey featuring the outlined 35-point leaf, blue shoulders, and lace-up collar.

With Reebok taking over the NHL jersey contract following the 2004–05 lockout, changes were expected when the Edge uniform system was set to debut in 2007. As part of the Edge overhaul, the TML monograms were removed from the shoulders, and the silver outlines on the numbers were replaced with blue or white outlines (e.g. the blue home jersey featured white numbers with blue and white outlines, rather than blue and silver), and the waistline stripes were removed. In 2010, the two waistline stripes were restored, the vintage leaf returned to the shoulders, and the player names and numbers were changed again, reverting to a simpler single-colour block font. Finally, lace-up collars were brought back to the primary uniforms. The Leafs also brought back the 1967–1970 blue uniform, replacing the white 1960s jersey as their third uniform. For the 2014 NHL Winter Classic, the Leafs wore a sweater inspired by their earlier uniforms in the 1930s.

On February 2, 2016, the team unveiled a new logo for the 2016–17 season in honour of its centennial, dropping the use of the Kabel-style font lettering used from 1970; it returns the logo to a form inspired by the earlier designs, with 31 points to allude to the 1931 opening of Maple Leaf Gardens, and 17 veins a reference to its establishment in 1917. 13 of the veins are positioned along the top part in honour of its 13 Stanley Cup victories. The logo was subsequently accompanied by a new uniform design that was unveiled during the 2016 NHL entry draft on June 24, 2016. In addition to the new logo, the new uniforms feature a custom block typeface for the player names and numbers. Two stripes remain on the sleeves, with a single stripe at the waistline. The updated design carried over to the Adidas Adizero uniforms adopted by the NHL in 2017.

The Maple Leafs have worn historical throwback uniforms for select games, with the club wearing Toronto Arenas or St. Pats-inspired throwback designs. Additionally, the Leafs have also used contemporary "historically inspired" uniforms as an alternate uniform. For the Centennial Classic, each Leafs player wore a blue sweater with bold white stripes across the chest and arms; the white stripe being a tribute to the St. Pats, while a stylized-"T" used by the Arenas featured on their hockey pants. For the 2020–21 season, the Maple Leafs wore "reverse retro" alternate uniforms, which included silver stripes inspired by the uniforms used from 1970 to 1972, while using the club's logo used from 1967 to 1970. Then for the 2022 Heritage Classic, the Maple Leafs donned a modified version of the team's Arenas throwbacks, with blue-on-blue lettering on the "Arenas" wordmark as a nod to the infamous 1978 uniforms. A second "reverse retro" alternate uniform, featuring the blue version of the white road uniforms they wore in 1962, was released. This design added a white shoulder yoke which was absent on the original blue uniform.

Other alternate uniforms worn by the team include a white uniform with two blue stripes across the chest and arms, paired this uniform with white pants worn for the 2018 NHL Stadium Series. The uniforms were largely coloured white as a tribute to the Royal Canadian Navy and also included bolder blue outlines to create uniforms more pronounced for outdoor settings.

During the 2021–22 season, the Leafs named video-sharing website TikTok as their helmet entitlement partner. Then in the 2022–23 season, the Maple Leafs announced a uniform sponsorship with the Dairy Farmers of Ontario, utilizing the organization's "Milk" insignia. For the 2023–24 season, Pizza Pizza became the team's helmet entitlement partner; however, they were only featured on the home helmets. In the 2024–25 season, Mondelez International's Oreo cookie served as the team's helmet entitlement partner, placing them on all of their helmets.

On March 22, 2022, the Maple Leafs unveiled a new alternate uniform, but for the first time in team history, black served as a base colour with the traditional blue serving as a trim colour. The "Next Gen" uniform features the team crest with a blue-and-black tie-dye background, along with a subtle black/blue skyline motif serving as sleeve stripes. It also comes with a reversible crest, featuring Canadian singer Justin Bieber's modified drew house insignia inside a yellow Maple Leafs logo and yellow stripes. The black/blue front is normally worn as a game uniform.

On November 2, 2026, the Maple Leafs unveiled a vintage white "Hometown Remix" uniform to celebrate its 100th anniversary as the Maple Leafs. The design featured the original Maple Leafs logo above the modern "TORONTO" wordmark in navy blue, along with navy blue striping.

==== Mascot ====
The Maple Leafs' mascot is Carlton the Bear, an anthropomorphic polar bear whose name and number (#60) come from the location of Maple Leaf Gardens at 60 Carlton Street, where the Leafs played throughout much of their history. Carlton made his first public appearance on July 29, 1995. He later made his regular season appearance on October 10, 1995.

=== Broadcasting ===
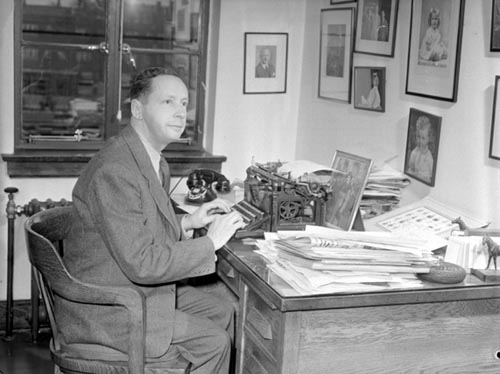
Foster Hewitt was the Maple Leafs' first radio play-by-play announcer from 1927 to 1968.

As a result of both Bell Canada and Rogers Communications having an ownership stake in MLSE until 2025, Maple Leafs broadcasts are split between the two media companies; with regional TV broadcasts split between Rogers' Sportsnet Ontario and Bell's TSN4. Colour commentary for Bell's television broadcasts is performed by Mike Johnson, while play-by-play is provided by Gord Miller. Colour commentary for Rogers' television broadcasts is performed by Craig Simpson, while play-by-play is provided by Chris Cuthbert; both also serve as the lead broadcast team of Hockey Night in Canada and Sportsnet's national TV broadcasts. From 2001 to 2022, MLSE also operated a specialty channel, the Leafs Nation Network.

Like the Maple Leafs television broadcasts, radio broadcasts are split evenly between Rogers' CJCL (Sportsnet 590, The Fan) and Bell's CHUM (TSN Radio 1050). Both Bell and Rogers' radio broadcasts have their colour commentary provided by Jim Ralph, with play-by-play provided by Joe Bowen.

Radio broadcasts of games played by the club were started in 1923. The first Leafs hockey game that was televised occurred on November 10, 1952; the broadcast also being the first English-language television broadcast of an NHL game in Canada. Foster Hewitt was the Leafs' first play-by-play broadcaster, providing radio play-by-play from 1927 to 1968. In addition, he provided play-by-play for television from 1952 to 1958, and colour commentary from 1958 to 1961. Originally aired over CFCA, Hewitt's broadcast was picked up by the Canadian Radio Broadcasting Commission (the CRBC) in 1933, moving to CBC Radio (the CRBC's successor) three years later.

=== Home arenas and practice facilities ===
Home arenas
Arena	Tenure
Arena Gardens	1917–1931
Maple Leaf Gardens	1931–1999
Scotiabank Arena	1999–present

The team's first home was the Arena Gardens, later known as the Mutual Street Arena. From 1912 until 1931, the Arena was ice hockey's premier site in Toronto. The Arena Gardens was the third arena in Canada to feature a mechanically frozen, or artificial, ice surface, and for 11 years was the only such facility in Eastern Canada. The Arena was demolished in 1989, with most of the site converted to residential developments. In 2011, parts of the site were made into a city park, known as Arena Gardens.

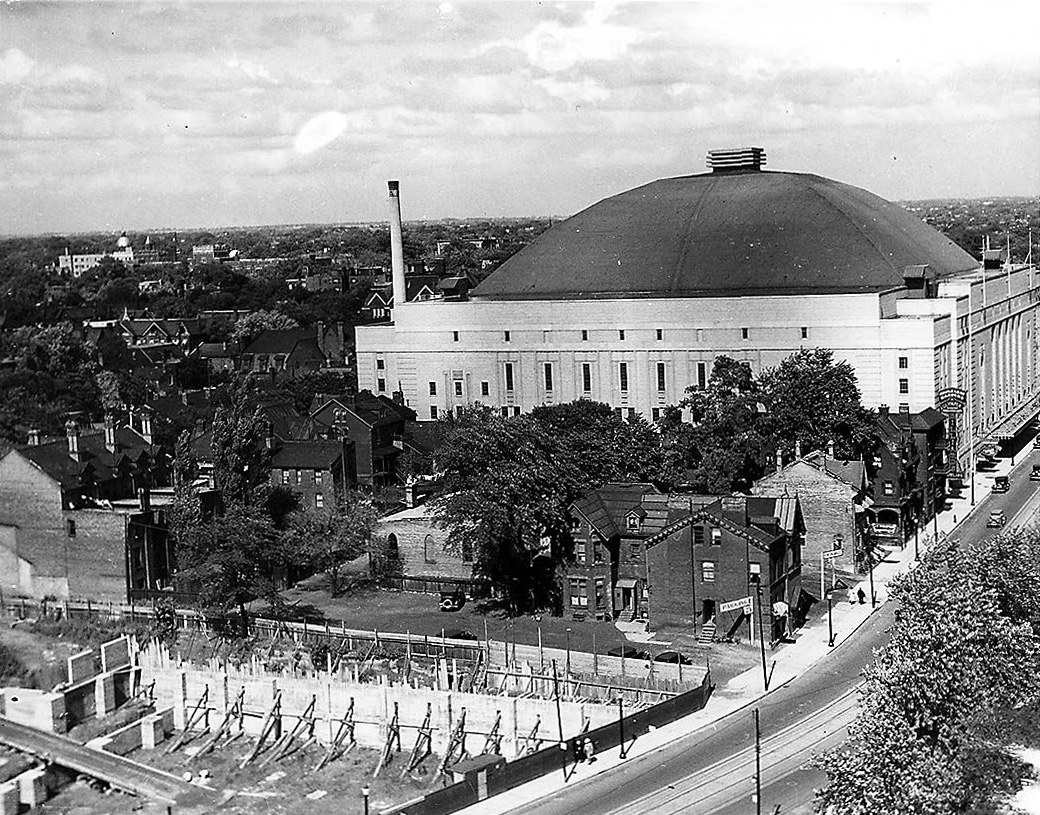
Opening in 1931, Maple Leaf Gardens was the home arena for the Maple Leafs from 1931 to 1999.

Within six months in 1931, Conn Smythe built Maple Leaf Gardens on the northwest corner of Carlton Street and Church Street, for C$1.5 million (C$30 million in 2025). The arena soon acquired nicknames including the "Carlton Street Cashbox", and the "Maple Leaf Mint", since the team's games were constantly sold out. The Maple Leafs won 11 Stanley Cups while playing at the Gardens. The first annual NHL All-Star Game was also held at Maple Leaf Gardens in 1947. The Gardens opened on November 12, 1931, with the Maple Leafs losing 2–1 to the Chicago Blackhawks. On February 13, 1999, the Maple Leafs played their last game at the Gardens, also suffering a 6–2 loss to the Blackhawks. The building is presently used as a multi-purpose facility, with a Loblaws grocery store occupying retail space on the lower floors, Joe Fresh and LCBO occupying another floor, and an athletics arena for Ryerson University (later renamed Toronto Metropolitan University) occupying the topmost level.

The Maple Leafs presently use two facilities in the City of Toronto. The club moved from the Gardens on February 20, 1999, to their current home arena, Air Canada Centre, later renamed Scotiabank Arena, a multi-purpose indoor entertainment arena on Bay Street in the South Core neighbourhood of Downtown Toronto. The arena is owned by the Maple Leafs' parent company MLSE and is shared with the NBA's Toronto Raptors (another MLSE subsidiary), as well as the National Lacrosse League's Toronto Rock. In addition to the main arena, the Maple Leafs also operate a practice facility at the Ford Performance Centre. The facility was opened in 2009 and operated by the Lakeshore Lions Club until September 2011, when the City of Toronto took over ownership of the facility after the Lions Club faced financial difficulties. The facility now operates as a City of Toronto-controlled corporation. The facility was known as the Mastercard Centre for Hockey Excellence until 2019 when it was renamed the Ford Performance Centre. The facility has three NHL rinks and one Olympic-sized rink.

On January 1, 2017, the Maple Leafs played the Detroit Red Wings in a home game at BMO Field, an outdoor multipurpose stadium at Exhibition Place, home to Leafs owner MLSE's other teams: the Toronto FC and the Toronto Argonauts. Known as the NHL Centennial Classic, the outdoor game served as a celebration for both the centennial season of the franchise and the NHL.

=== Minor league affiliates ===
The Maple Leafs are affiliated with the Toronto Marlies of the American Hockey League, the Marlies play from Coca-Cola Coliseum in Toronto. The Maple Leafs' parent company has owned the Marlies franchise since 1978.

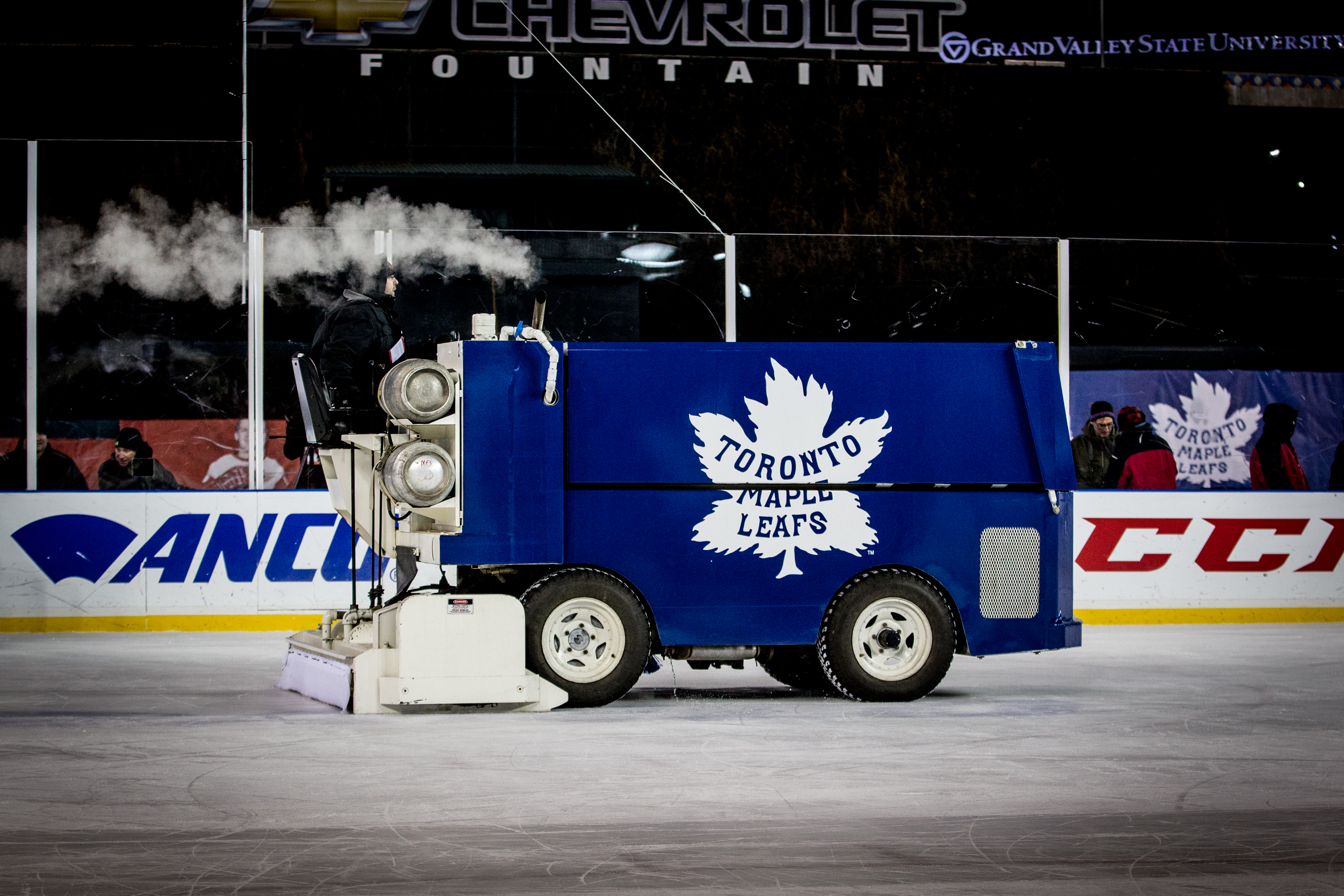
A Maple Leafs–branded zamboni during an AHL game between the Grand Rapids Griffins and the Toronto Marlies. The Marlies is the Leafs' AHL affiliate.

The first AHL affiliate owned by the Maple Leafs was the Rochester Americans, a team the Leafs initially co-owned with the Montreal Canadiens from 1956 to 1959, before MLGL bought out the Canadiens' share in the team. MLGL held sole ownership of the team until it was sold to an investor group in 1966. However, it continued to serve as their minor league affiliate until 1969. The Leafs did not have an AHL affiliate from 1969 to 1978 and relied on placing their drafted players with other team's affiliates. However, after several poor draft picks and having insufficient control over their prospect's development, MLGL opted to reestablish their own farm system; co-founding the Marlies franchise in 1978, and operating the Cincinnati Tigers of the Central Hockey League from 1981 to 1982. (Note: From 1978 to 1982, ownership of the Marlies franchise, then known as the New Brunswick Hawks, was shared with the Chicago Black Hawks. In 1982, the Black Hawks pulled out of the joint management relationship.) The Marlies were initially established as the New Brunswick Hawks, and were later relocated to St. Catherines, Newmarket, and St. John's, before finally moving to Toronto in 2005.

The Newfoundland Growlers were the ECHL affiliate of the Maple Leafs from 2018 until 2024, they played from the Mary Brown's Centre in St. John's, Newfoundland. Unlike the Marlies, the Growlers were not owned by the Leafs' parent company but were instead owned by Deacon Sports and Entertainment. The Growlers folded in 2024. The Cincinnati Cyclones signed an agreement to become the ECHL affiliate of the Maple Leafs in July 2024.

The Marlies were named after the Toronto Marlboros, a junior hockey team named after the Duke of Marlborough. Founded in 1903, the Marlboros were sponsored by the Leafs from 1927 to 1989. The Marlboros constituted one of two junior hockey teams the Leafs formerly sponsored, the other being the Toronto St. Michael's Majors. The sponsored junior system served as the Leafs primary farm system for young replacement players from the 1940s to 1950s. Formal NHL sponsorship of junior teams ceased in 1966, making all qualifying prospects not already on NHL-sponsored lists eligible for the draft.

=== Ownership ===
The Maple Leafs is one of six professional sports teams owned by Maple Leaf Sports & Entertainment (MLSE). In 2024, Forbes estimated the value of the club at US$3.8 billion, making the Maple Leafs the most valuable franchise in the NHL. However, MLSE has refuted past valuations made by Forbes.

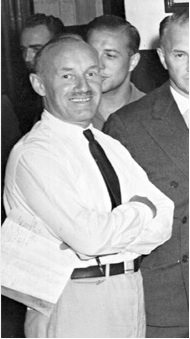
Conn Smythe at Maple Leaf Gardens, 1939. Smythe was the principal owner of the club from 1927 to 1961.

Initially, ownership of the club was held by the Arena Gardens of Toronto, Limited; an ownership group fronted by Henry Pellatt that owned and managed Arena Gardens. The club was named a permanent franchise in the League following its inaugural season, with team manager Charles Querrie, and the Arena Gardens treasurer Hubert Vearncombe as its owners. The Arena Company owned the club until 1919 when litigations from Eddie Livingstone forced the company to declare bankruptcy. Querrie brokered the sale of the Arena Garden's share to the owners of the amateur St. Patricks Hockey Club. Maintaining his shares in the club, Querrie fronted the new ownership group until 1927, when the club was put up for sale. Toronto Varsity Blues coach Conn Smythe put together an ownership group and purchased the franchise for CA$160,000 (equivalent to $2,887,033 in 2025). In 1929, Smythe decided, amid the Great Depression, that the Maple Leafs needed a new arena. To finance it, Smythe launched Maple Leaf Gardens Limited (MLGL), a publicly traded management company to own both the Maple Leafs and the new arena, which was named Maple Leaf Gardens. Smythe traded his stake in the Leafs for shares in MLGL and sold shares in the holding company to the public to help fund construction for the arena.

Although Smythe was the face of MLGL from its founding, he did not gain a controlling interest in the company until 1947. Smythe remained MLGL's principal owner until 1961 when he sold 90 per cent of his shares to an ownership group consisting of Harold Ballard, John W. H. Bassett and Stafford Smythe. Ballard became majority owner in February 1972 shortly following the death of Stafford Smythe. Ballard was the principal owner of MLGL until he died in 1990. The company remained a publicly traded company until 1998, when an ownership group fronted by Steve Stavro privatized the company by acquiring more than the 90 per cent of stock necessary to force objecting shareholders out.

While initially primarily a hockey company, with ownership stakes in several junior hockey clubs including the Toronto Marlboros of the Ontario Hockey Association, the company later branched out to own the Hamilton Tiger-Cats of the Canadian Football League from the late 1970s to late 1980s (though the company would later sell off the Tiger-Cats). On February 12, 1998, MLGL purchased the Toronto Raptors of the National Basketball Association, who were constructing the then–Air Canada Centre. After MLGL acquired the Raptors, the company changed its name to MLSE. The Raptors purchase included the Air Canada Centre and Maple Leaf Gardens was sold to Ryerson University (later renamed Toronto Metropolitan University). The company's portfolio has since expanded to include the Toronto FC of Major League Soccer, the Toronto Marlies of the AHL, the Toronto Argonauts of the Canadian Football League, and a 37.5 per cent stake in Maple Leaf Square.

In 2012, the Ontario Teachers' Pension Plan (the company's former principal owner) announced the sale of its 75 per cent stake in MLSE to a consortium made up of telecommunications rivals Bell Canada and Rogers Communications, in a deal valued at $1.32 billion. As part of the sale, two numbered companies were created to jointly hold stock. This ownership structure ensures that, at the shareholder level, Rogers and Bell vote their overall 75 per cent interest in the company together and thus decisions on the management of the company must be made by consensus between the two. A portion of Bell's share in MLSE is owned by its pension fund, to make Bell's share in MLSE under 30 per cent. This was done so that Bell could retain its existing 18 per cent interest in the Montreal Canadiens; as NHL's conflict of interest rules prevent any shareholder that owns more than 30 per cent of a team from holding an ownership position in another. The remaining 25 per cent is owned by Larry Tanenbaum, who is also the chairman of MLSE.

In July 2025, Rogers purchased bell's 37.5 per cent share of MLSE for $4.7 billion to become majority owners.

Ownership structure of Maple Leafs Sports & Entertainment until 2025

MLSE; 100%
Rogers/Bell holding company 75%	Kilmer Sports; 25%
Rogers Communications; 50%	Bell holding company 50%	Larry Tanenbaum; 100%
Bell Canada Enterprises; 74.67%	BCE Master Trust Fund; 25.33%

== Season-by-season record ==
This is a partial list of the last five seasons completed by the Maple Leafs. For the full season-by-season history, see List of Toronto Maple Leafs seasons

Note: GP = Games played, W = Wins, L = Losses, OTL = Overtime Losses, Pts = Points, GF = Goals for, GA = Goals against

Season	GP	W	L	OTL	Pts	GF	GA	Finish	Playoffs
2021–22	82	54	21	7	115	315	253	2nd, Atlantic	Lost in first round, 3–4 (Lightning)
2022–23	82	50	21	11	111	279	222	2nd, Atlantic	Lost in second round, 1–4 (Panthers)
2023–24	82	46	26	10	102	303	263	3rd, Atlantic	Lost in first round, 3–4 (Bruins)
2024–25	82	52	26	4	108	268	231	1st, Atlantic	Lost in second round, 3–4 (Panthers)
2025–26	82	32	36	14	78	253	299	8th, Atlantic	Did not qualify

== Players and personnel ==
=== Current roster ===
Updated November 15, 2026

No.	Nat	Player	Pos	S/G	Age	Acquired	Birthplace
3	(United States)	Nick Blankenburg	D	R	28	2026	Washington Township, Michigan
73	(Latvia)	Teddy Blueger	C	L	32	2026	Riga, Latvia
72	(Russia)	Sergei Bobrovsky	G	L	38	2026	Novokuznetsk, Soviet Union
53	(Canada)	Easton Cowan	RW	L	21	2023	Mount Brydges, Ontario
11	(Canada)	Max Domi	LW	L	31	2023	Winnipeg, Manitoba
24	(United States)	Brandon Duhaime	LW	L	29	2026	Coral Springs, Florida
95	(Sweden)	Oliver Ekman-Larsson	D	L	35	2024	Karlskrona, Sweden
29	(Canada)	Benoit-Olivier Groulx	C	L	26	2025	Rouen, France
81	(United States)	Dakota Joshua	C	L	30	2025	Dearborn, Michigan
71	(United States)	Vinni Lettieri	C	R	31	2025	Excelsior, Minnesota
19	(Canada)	Zack MacEwen	C	R	30	2026	Charlottetown, Prince Edward Island
86	(Russia)	Kirill Marchenko	RW	R	26	2026	Barnaul, Russia
34	(United States)	Auston Matthews (C)	C	L	29	2016	San Ramon, California
22	(United States)	Jake McCabe	D	L	33	2023	Eau Claire, Wisconsin
92	(Canada)	Gavin McKenna	LW	L	18	2026	Whitehorse, Yukon
82	(Canada)	Cole McWard	D	R	25	2026	Fenton, Missouri
36	(United States)	Dakota Mermis	D	L	32	2025	Alton, Illinois
90	(Latvia)	Elvis Merzļikins	G	L	32	2026	Riga, Latvia
88	(Sweden)	William Nylander	RW	R	30	2014	Calgary, Alberta
20	(Canada)	Nick Paul	LW	L	31	2026	Mississauga, Ontario
43	(Canada)	Darren Raddysh	D	R	30	2026	Caledon, Ontario
44	(Canada)	Morgan Rielly (A)	D	L	32	2012	West Vancouver, British Columbia
83	(Canada)	Marshall Rifai	D	L	28	2023	Beaconsfield, Quebec
96	(United States)	Jack Roslovic	C	R	29	2026	Columbus, Ohio
15	(Canada)	Colton Sissons	C	R	33	2026	North Vancouver, British Columbia
28	(Canada)	Troy Stecher	D	R	32	2025	Richmond, British Columbia
41	(United States)	Anthony Stolarz	G	L	32	2024	Edison, New Jersey
8	(Canada)	Christopher Tanev	D	R	36	2024	East York, Ontario
91	(Canada)	John Tavares (A)	C	L	36	2018	Mississauga, Ontario
76	(Canada)	William Villeneuve	D	R	24	2020	Sherbrooke, Quebec
18	(United States)	Miles Wood	LW	L	31	2026	Buffalo, New York

=== Team captains ===
In all, 25 individuals have served as captain of the Toronto Maple Leafs. (Note: Three individuals have served two tenures as team captain.) Ken Randall served as the team's first captain for two years beginning with the inaugural 1917–18 NHL season. John Ross Roach was the first goaltender to be named captain in the NHL, and the only goaltender to serve as the Leafs' captain. He was one of only six goalies in NHL history to have been officially recognized as the team captain. George Armstrong served as captain from 1958 through 1969 and was the longest-serving captain in the team's history. In 1997, Mats Sundin became the first non-Canadian to captain the Maple Leafs. His tenure as captain holds the distinction as the longest captaincy for a non-North American-born player in NHL history. The most recent player named to the position was Auston Matthews on August 14, 2024.

Three captains of the Maple Leafs have held the position at multiple points in their careers. Syl Apps' first tenure as the captain began from 1940 to 1943, before he stepped down and left the club to enlist in the Canadian Army. Bob Davidson served as the Maple Leafs captain until Apps' return from the Army in 1945 and resumed his captaincy until 1948. Ted Kennedy's first tenure as captain was from 1948 to 1955. He announced his retirement from the sport at the end of the 1954–55 season, with Sid Smith succeeding him as captain. Although Kennedy missed the entire 1955–56 season, he came out of retirement to play the second half of the 1956–57 season. During that half-season, Kennedy served his second tenure as the Maple Leafs' captain. Darryl Sittler was the third player to have been named the team's captain twice. As a result of a dispute between Sittler and the Maple Leafs' general manager Punch Imlach, Sittler relinquished the captaincy on December 29, 1979. The dispute was resolved in the following off-season after a heart attack hospitalized Imlach. Sittler arranged talks with Ballard to resolve the issue, eventually resuming his captaincy on September 24, 1980. No replacement captain was named during the interim period.

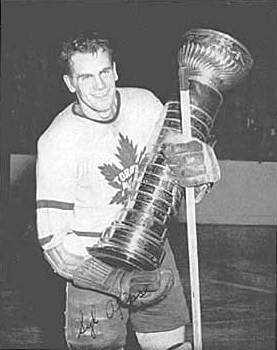
Syl Apps led the team to three Stanley Cups as captain from 1940 to 1943 and again from 1945 to 1948. From 1943 to 1945, Apps was serving with the Canadian Army.

- Ken Randall, 1917–1919
- Frank Heffernan, 1919–1920
- Reg Noble, 1920–1922
- Jack Adams, 1922–1924
- John Ross Roach, 1924–1925
- Babe Dye, 1925–1926
- Bert Corbeau, 1926–1927
- Hap Day, 1927–1937
- Charlie Conacher, 1937–1938
- Red Horner, 1938–1940
- Syl Apps, 1940–1943
- Bob Davidson, 1943–1945
- Syl Apps, 1945–1948
- Ted Kennedy, 1948–1955
- Sid Smith, 1955–1956
- Jimmy Thomson, 1956–1957
- Ted Kennedy, 1957
- George Armstrong, 1958–1969
- Dave Keon, 1969–1975
- Darryl Sittler, 1975–1979, 1980–1982
- Rick Vaive, 1982–1986
- Rob Ramage, 1989–1991
- Wendel Clark, 1991–1994
- Doug Gilmour, 1994–1997
- Mats Sundin, 1997–2008
- Dion Phaneuf, 2010–2016
- John Tavares, 2019–2024
- Auston Matthews, 2024–present

=== Head coaches ===
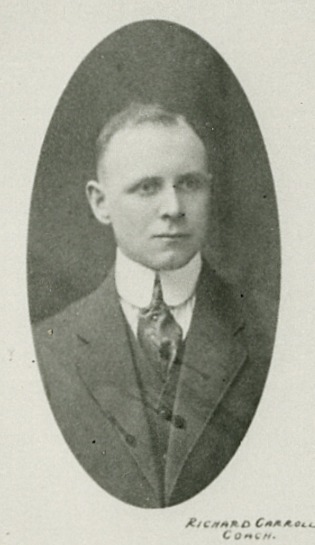
Dick Carroll was the first coach for the club. He was the coach from 1917 to 1919. He won one Cup with the Arenas.

The Maple Leafs have had 41 head coaches (including four interim coaches). The franchise's first head coach was Dick Carroll, who coached the team for two seasons. Several coaches have served as the Leafs head coach on multiple occasions. King Clancy was named the head coach on three occasions while Charles Querrie and Punch Imlach served the position on two occasions. Jim Hiller is the Maple Leafs' current head coach, having been hired on June 17, 2026.

Punch Imlach coached the most regular season games of any Leafs' head coach with 770 games, and has the most all-time points with the Maple Leafs, with 865. He is followed by Pat Quinn, who coached 574 games, with 678 points all-time with the Maple Leafs. Both Mike Rodden and Dick Duff, have the fewest points with the Maple Leafs, with 0. Both were interim coaches who coached only two games each in 1927 and 1980 respectively, losing both games. Sheldon Keefe earned the most points of any Leafs head coach in a single season, with 115 points during the 2021–22 season. Five Maple Leafs' coaches have been inducted into the Hockey Hall of Fame as players, while four others were inducted as builders. Pat Burns is the only Leafs' head coach to win a Jack Adams Award with the team.

=== Draft picks ===
In the 1963 NHL amateur draft, the NHL's inaugural draft, the Maple Leafs selected Walt McKechnie, a centre from the London Nationals with their first pick, sixth overall. Two Maple Leafs captains were obtained through the draft, Darryl Sittler in the 1970 draft; as well as Wendel Clark in the 1985 draft. The Maple Leafs have drafted three players with a first overall draft pick; Clark in the 1985 draft, Auston Matthews in the 2016 draft, and Gavin McKenna in the 2026 draft. Other notable Maple Leafs draft picks and current players with the team are defenceman Morgan Rielly (fifth overall, 2012), and wingers William Nylander and Mitch Marner (eighth and fourth overall in 2014 and 2015 respectively). The team's most recent first-round selection was Gavin McKenna, at first overall in the 2026 draft.

=== Announcers ===
The Toronto Maple Leafs have had four PA announcers in their history. In addition, Harold (Hap) Watson was the Toronto Arenas' announcer in 1929 before the team moved to Maple Leaf Gardens and became the Toronto Maple Leafs.

- Walter (Red) Barber (1931–1961) (Note: Despite the similarity in names he is not the Red Barber who was the PA announcer for the Brooklyn Dodgers and other US teams.)
- Paul Morris (1961–1999)
- Andy Frost (1999–2016)
- Mike Ross (2016–present)

== Team and league honours ==
The Maple Leafs have won 13 Stanley Cups in its history. Toronto's first two Stanley Cups, in 1918 and 1922, took place when the Stanley Cup tournament operated as an interleague competition. (Note: The 1918 Stanley Cup playoffs included teams from the NHL and the PCHA. The 1922 Stanley Cup playoffs included teams from the NHL, as well as the PCHA and WCHL.) Toronto's subsequent 11 Stanley Cups were awarded after 1926 when the Cup was established as the championship trophy of the NHL. The Maple Leafs won their last Stanley Cup in 1967, with the team's 57-season Stanley Cup drought being the longest championship drought in the NHL. The Maple Leafs were also awarded the Prince of Wales Trophy twice, following the 1946–47 season, and the 1962–63 season. The Prince of Wales Trophy was awarded to the club when it was used as NHL's regular season championship trophy. (Note: The Prince of Wales Trophy was used as the NHL's regular season championship trophy from the 1938–39 season to the 1966–67 season.)

=== Retired numbers ===
Retired numbers
No.	Player	Position	Tenure	Date of honour	Date of retirement
1	Turk Broda	G	1935–1943; 1946–1951	March 11, 1995	October 15, 2016
1	Johnny Bower	G	1958–1969	March 11, 1995	October 15, 2016
4	Hap Day	D	1924–1937	October 4, 2006	October 15, 2016
4	Red Kelly	C	1960–1967	October 4, 2006	October 15, 2016
5	Bill Barilko	D	1945–1951	Not honoured	October 17, 1992
6	Ace Bailey	RW	1926–1933	Not honoured	February 14, 1934
7	King Clancy	D	1930–1937	November 21, 1995	October 15, 2016
7	Tim Horton	D	1949–1970	November 21, 1995	October 15, 2016
9	Charlie Conacher	RW	1929–1938	February 28, 1998	October 15, 2016
9	Ted Kennedy	C	1942–1955; 1956–1957	October 3, 1993	October 15, 2016
10	Syl Apps	C	1936–1943; 1945–1948	October 3, 1993	October 15, 2016
10	George Armstrong	RW	1949–1971	February 28, 1998	October 15, 2016
13	Mats Sundin	C	1994–2008	February 11, 2012	October 15, 2016
14	Dave Keon	C	1960–1975	Not honoured	October 15, 2016
17	Wendel Clark	LW	1985–1994; 1996–1998; 2000	November 22, 2008	October 15, 2016
21	Börje Salming	D	1973–1989	October 4, 2006	October 15, 2016
27	Frank Mahovlich	LW	1956–1968	October 3, 2001	October 15, 2016
27	Darryl Sittler	C	1970–1982	February 8, 2003	October 15, 2016
93	Doug Gilmour	C	1992–1997; 2003	January 31, 2009	October 15, 2016

Player elected to the Hockey Hall of Fame
Number retired for multiple players
Number was not honoured before being retired

The Maple Leafs have retired the numbers of 19 players; as some players used the same number, only 13 numbers have been retired. Between October 17, 1992, and October 15, 2016, the Maple Leafs took a unique approach to retired numbers. Whereas players who suffered a career-ending injury had their numbers retired, "great" players had their number "honoured". Honoured numbers remained in general circulation for players, however, during Brian Burke's tenure as the Maple Leafs' general manager, the use of honoured numbers required his approval.

During this period, only two players met the criteria for retirement, the first being number 6, worn by Ace Bailey and retired on February 14, 1934; and Bill Barilko's number 5, retired on October 17, 1992. The retirement of Bailey's number was the first of its kind in professional sports. It was briefly taken out of retirement after Bailey asked that Ron Ellis be allowed to wear his number. Bailey's number returned to retirement after Ellis's final game on January 14, 1981.

The first players to have their numbers honoured were Syl Apps and Ted Kennedy, on October 3, 1993. Mats Sundin was the last player to have his number honoured on February 11, 2012. On October 15, 2016, before the home opening game of the team's centenary season, the Maple Leafs announced they had changed their philosophy on retiring numbers, and that the numbers of those 16 honoured players would now be retired, in addition to the retirement of Dave Keon's number.

As well as honouring and retiring the numbers, the club also commissioned statues of former Maple Leafs. The group of statues, known as Legends Row, is a 9.2 metres (30 ft) granite hockey bench with statues of former club players. Unveiled in September 2014, it is located outside Gate 5 of Scotiabank Arena, at Maple Leaf Square. As of October 2017, statues have been made of 14 players with retired numbers.

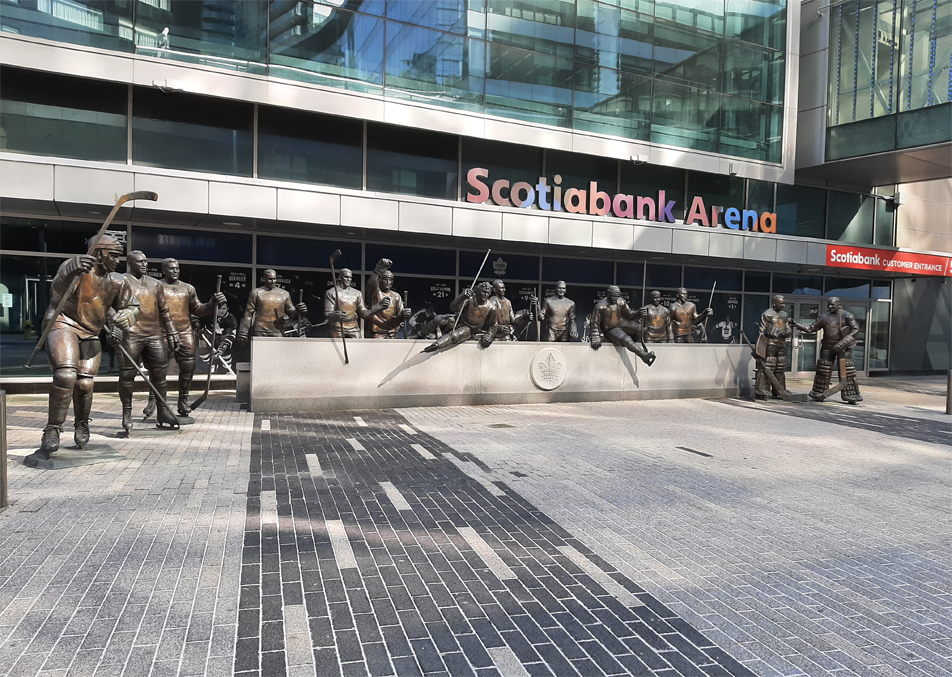
Legends Row, a group of statues outside Scotiabank Arena

In addition to the 13 numbers retired by the Maple Leafs, the number 99 is also retired from use in the organization. At the 2000 NHL All-Star Game hosted in Toronto, the NHL announced the league-wide retirement of Wayne Gretzky's number 99, retiring it from use throughout all its member teams, including the Maple Leafs.

=== Hall of Fame ===
The Toronto Maple Leafs have an affiliation with 82 inductees of the Hockey Hall of Fame. As of 2016, the team's official media guide acknowledged an affiliation with 74 inductees, consisting of 61 former players as well as 13 builders of the sport. Three additional players (Eddie Gerard, Frank Nighbor and Norm Ullman) have also suited up for the Maple Leafs and been inducted into the Hall of Fame despite being omitted from the team's media guide, and several players and personnel have been inducted since the guide's publication.

The Maple Leafs have the greatest number of players inducted into the Hockey Hall of Fame of any NHL team. The 15 individuals recognized as builders of the sport include former Maple Leafs broadcasters, executives, head coaches, and other personnel relating to the club's operations. Member of the Hall of Fame who were inducted in one category but served with the Maple Leafs in a different capacity (for example, Ken Dryden, who was inducted into the Hall of Fame as a player in 1983 and served as Maple Leafs general manager from 1997 to 1999) are not included among the above figures or in the below list.

Inducted in 2025, Alexander Mogilny and Joe Thornton are the latest Maple Leafs players to be inducted into the Hockey Hall of Fame. Brian Burke was announced as a part of the 2026 Hall of Fame class, and will be inducted in November.

In addition to the 82 players and builders, five broadcasters for the Maple Leafs were also awarded the Foster Hewitt Memorial Award from the Hockey Hall of Fame. In 1984, radio broadcaster Foster Hewitt was awarded the Hall of Fame's inaugural Foster Hewitt Memorial Award, an award named after him. Before the award's creation, Hewitt had already been inducted as a builder into the Hall of Fame. Other Maple Leafs broadcasters that received the award include Wes McKnight in 1986, Bob Cole in 2007, Bill Hewitt in 2007 and Joe Bowen in 2018.

Players

- Jack Adams
- Glenn Anderson
- Dave Andreychuk
- Syl Apps
- George Armstrong
- Ace Bailey
- Tom Barrasso
- Andy Bathgate
- Ed Belfour
- Max Bentley
- Leo Boivin
- Johnny Bower
- Turk Broda
- Harry Cameron
- Gerry Cheevers
- King Clancy
- Sprague Cleghorn
- Charlie Conacher
- Rusty Crawford
- Hap Day
- Gordie Drillon
- Dick Duff
- Babe Dye
- Fernie Flaman
- Ron Francis
- Grant Fuhr
- Mike Gartner
- Eddie Gerard
- Doug Gilmour
- George Hainsworth
- Hap Holmes
- Red Horner
- Tim Horton
- Phil Housley
- Syd Howe
- Busher Jackson
- Red Kelly
- Ted Kennedy
- Dave Keon
- Brian Leetch
- Eric Lindros
- Harry Lumley
- Frank Mahovlich
- Lanny McDonald
- Alexander Mogilny
- Dickie Moore
- Larry Murphy
- Joe Nieuwendyk
- Frank Nighbor
- Reg Noble
- Bert Olmstead
- Bernie Parent
- Pierre Pilote
- Jacques Plante
- Babe Pratt
- Joe Primeau
- Marcel Pronovost
- Bob Pulford
- Börje Salming
- Terry Sawchuk
- Sweeney Schriner
- Darryl Sittler
- Allan Stanley
- Mats Sundin
- Joe Thornton
- Norm Ullman
- Harry Watson

Builders

- Harold Ballard
- Jack Bickell
- Pat Burns
- Cliff Fletcher
- Jim Gregory
- Foster Hewitt
- William A. Hewitt
- Punch Imlach
- Dick Irvin
- Lou Lamorello
- Roger Neilson
- Pat Quinn
- Frank J. Selke
- Conn Smythe

=== Franchise career leaders ===
These are the top franchise leaders in regular season points, goals, assists, points per game, games played, and goaltending wins as of the end of the 2025–26 season.

- * – current Maple Leafs player

Points
Player	Pos	GP	G	A	Pts	P/G
Mats Sundin	C	981	420	567	987	1.01
Darryl Sittler	C	844	389	527	916	1.09
Dave Keon	C	1,062	365	493	858	.81
Auston Matthews*	C	689	428	352	780	1.13
Börje Salming	D	1,099	148	620	768	.70
Mitch Marner	RW	657	221	520	741	1.13
George Armstrong	RW	1,188	296	417	713	.60
William Nylander*	RW	750	292	399	691	.92
Ron Ellis	RW	1,034	332	308	640	.62
Frank Mahovlich	LW	720	296	301	597	.83

Goals
Player	Pos	G
Auston Matthews*	C	428
Mats Sundin	C	420
Darryl Sittler	C	389
Dave Keon	C	365
Ron Ellis	RW	332
Rick Vaive	RW	299
George Armstrong	RW	296
Frank Mahovlich	LW	296
William Nylander*	RW	292
Wendel Clark	LW	260

Assists
Player	Pos	A
Börje Salming	D	620
Mats Sundin	C	567
Darryl Sittler	C	527
Mitch Marner	RW	520
Dave Keon	C	493
Morgan Rielly*	D	451
Tomáš Kaberle	D	437
George Armstrong	RW	417
William Nylander*	RW	399
Auston Matthews*	C	352

Points per game
Player	Pos	P/G
Babe Dye	RW	1.24
Doug Gilmour	C	1.15
Auston Matthews*	C	1.13
Reg Noble	C	1.13
Mitch Marner	RW	1.13
Wilf Paiement	RW	1.09
Darryl Sittler	C	1.09
Ed Olczyk	C	1.04
Corb Denneny	C	1.04
Syl Apps	C	1.02

Games played
Player	Pos	GP
George Armstrong	RW	1,188
Tim Horton	D	1,184
Börje Salming	D	1,099
Dave Keon	C	1,062
Ron Ellis	RW	1,034
Mats Sundin	C	981
Morgan Rielly*	D	951
Bob Pulford	LW	947
Tomáš Kaberle	D	878
Darryl Sittler	C	844

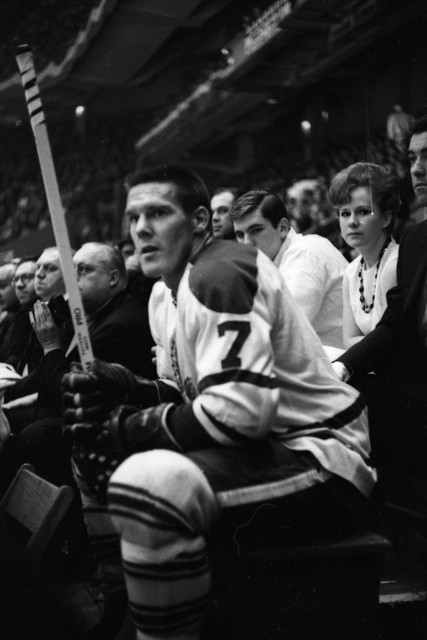
Tim Horton played the second-most games with the Maple Leafs, and the most amongst defencemen.

Goaltenders
Player	GP	W	L	T/O	GA	GAA	SA	SV%	SO
Turk Broda	629	304	222	102	1,608	2.53	—	—	61
Johnny Bower	475	219	157	79	1,139	2.50	14,607	.922	32
Félix Potvin	369	160	149	49	1,026	2.87	11,133	.908	12
Frederik Andersen	268	149	74	36	726	2.79	8,466	.914	13
Curtis Joseph	270	138	97	28	656	2.49	7,257	.910	17
Mike Palmateer	296	129	112	41	964	3.44	8,886	.892	15
Harry Lumley	267	103	106	58	581	2.18	1,696	—	34
Lorne Chabot	214	102	78	31	470	2.16	—	—	31
John Ross Roach	222	98	107	17	639	2.81	—	—	13
Ed Belfour	170	93	61	15	422	2.51	4,775	.912	17

== See also ==
- List of Toronto Maple Leafs players
- List of Toronto Maple Leafs general managers
- Toronto Maple Leafs in popular culture

== Notes ==
Preceded by Seattle Metropolitans	Toronto; Stanley Cup champions 1917–18	Succeeded by Ottawa Senators
Preceded by Ottawa Senators	Toronto St. Pats; Stanley Cup champions 1921–22	Succeeded by Ottawa Senators
Preceded by Montreal Canadiens	Stanley Cup champions 1931–32	Succeeded by New York Rangers
Preceded by Boston Bruins	Stanley Cup champions 1941–42	Succeeded by Detroit Red Wings
Preceded by Montreal Canadiens	Stanley Cup champions 1944–45	Succeeded by Montreal Canadiens
Preceded by Montreal Canadiens	Stanley Cup champions 1946–47, 1947–48, 1948–49	Succeeded by Detroit Red Wings
Preceded by Detroit Red Wings	Stanley Cup champions 1950–51	Succeeded by Detroit Red Wings
Preceded by Chicago Black Hawks	Stanley Cup champions 1961–62, 1962–63, 1963–64	Succeeded by Montreal Canadiens
Preceded by Montreal Canadiens	Stanley Cup champions 1966–67	Succeeded by Montreal Canadiens
