= 1921–22 Toronto St. Patricks season =

NHL hockey team season (won 2nd Stanley Cup)

1921–22 Toronto St. Patricks
- Stanley Cup champions
- O'Brien Trophy winners
- League: 2nd NHL
- 1921–22 record: 13–10–1
- Home record: 8–4–0
- Road record: 5–6–1
- Goals for: 98
- Goals against: 97

Team information
- General manager: Charles Querrie
- Coach: George O'Donoghue
- Captain: Reg Noble
- Arena: Arena Gardens

Team leaders
- Goals: Babe Dye (31)
- Assists: Harry Cameron (8)
- Points: Babe Dye (37)
- Penalty minutes: Corbett Denneny (28)
- Wins: John Ross Roach (11)
- Goals against average: John Ross Roach (4.07)

The 1921–22 Toronto St. Patricks season was the fifth season of the Toronto NHL franchise, third as the St. Patricks. This was the first time the team made the playoffs in back to back years in franchise history. The St. Patricks would win the NHL championship and the Stanley Cup.

== Regular season ==
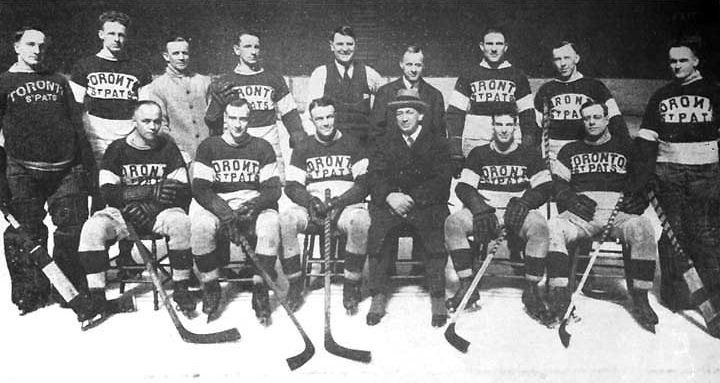
Team photograph

Prior to the season, St. Pats goaltender Jake Forbes was denied a pay raise, and he refused to play with the team for the 1921–22 season. Toronto suspended Forbes from the club, and signed free agent goaltender John Ross Roach.

The St. Pats played consistent hockey all season long, finishing the season with a 13–10–1, earning 27 points, and finishing in second place in the league, behind the Senators, and once again earned a spot in the O'Brien Cup finals.

Babe Dye led the St. Pats with 30 goals, two less than league leader Punch Broadbent of the Ottawa Senators, and his 37 points was the third highest in the NHL, behind Broadbent and Senators teammate Cy Denneny. Harry Cameron scored 19 goals and 27 points from the blueline, while Corbett Denneny also scored 19 goals and earned 26 points in total. Reg Noble had another solid season, scoring 17 goals and 25 points, while Ken Randall also got into double digits with goals, scoring 10. Denneny led the club with 28 penalty minutes, with Randall just behind him, getting 20 penalty minutes.

In goal, John Ross Roach had a solid rookie season, playing in 22 games, finishing with a record of 11–10–1, and a GAA of 4.07.

=== Season standings ===
National Hockey League
	GP	W	L	T	Pts	GF	GA
**Ottawa Senators**	24	14	8	2	30	106	84
**Toronto St. Patricks**	24	13	10	1	27	98	97
Montreal Canadiens	24	12	11	1	25	88	94
Hamilton Tigers	24	7	17	0	14	88	105

Note: GP = Games played, W = Wins, L = Losses, T = Ties, Pts = Points, GF = Goals for, GA = Goals against
Teams that qualified for the playoffs are highlighted in bold.

=== Record vs. opponents ===
1921–22 NHL Records
Team	HAM	MTL	OTT	TOR
Hamilton	—	1–7	3–5	3–5
Montreal	7–1	—	1–6–1	4–4
Ottawa	5–3	6–1–1	—	3–4–1
Toronto	5–3	4–4	4–3–1	—

== Playoffs ==
The St. Pats met the Ottawa Senators in the two game, total goal O'Brien Cup finals. Ottawa upset Toronto the previous year, however this season, Toronto was the underdog, as they finished 3 points behind the Senators in the NHL standings. The St. Pats defeated the Senators in the first game held at Mutual Street Arena by a score of 5–4. The series moved to Dey's Arena in Ottawa for the second game, and the St. Pats used the strategy of icing the puck whenever possible in this game to keep their lead, and it worked, as the teams played to a 0–0 tie, as Toronto advanced to the Stanley Cup finals, winning the series 5–4.

Toronto faced the Vancouver Millionaires of the PCHA to determine the winner of the 1922 Stanley Cup Finals in a best of 5 series, with all games being played at Mutual Street Arena. Vancouver took a 1–0 series lead, defeating Toronto 4–3, however, Babe Dye scored in overtime in the second game, evening the series to one win a piece. Vancouver took a 2–1 series lead, defeating the St. Pats 3–0 in the third game. The Millionaires looked to end the series in the fourth game, however, John Ross Roach shutout Vancouver 6–0, setting up a Stanley Cup deciding fifth game. The St. Pats, led by Babe Dye and his four goals, easily defeated Vancouver 5–1, as the Toronto franchise won the Stanley Cup for the second time in team history.

== Schedule and results ==
=== Regular season ===
1921–22 regular season
December

Game	Date	Visitor	Score	Home	Record	Pts
1	December 17	Montreal Canadiens	2–5	Toronto St. Pats	1–0–0	2
2	December 21	Toronto St. Pats	5–4	Ottawa Senators	2–0–0	4
3	December 24	Hamilton Tigers	4–2	Toronto St. Pats	2–1–0	4
4	December 28	Toronto St. Pats	4–3	Hamilton Tigers	3–1–0	6
5	December 31	Toronto St. Pats	3–5	Montreal Canadiens	3–2–0	6

January

Game	Date	Visitor	Score	Home	Record	Pts
6	January 4	Ottawa Senators	2–3	Toronto St. Pats	4–2–0	8
7	January 7	Hamilton Tigers	2–5	Toronto St. Pats	5–2–0	10
8	January 11	Toronto St. Pats	2–7	Ottawa Senators	5–3–0	10
9	January 14	Ottawa Senators	5–2	Toronto St. Pats	5–4–0	10
10	January 18	Toronto St. Pats	4–9	Hamilton Tigers	5–5–0	10
11	January 21	Toronto St. Pats	5–3	Montreal Canadiens	6–5–0	12
12	January 25	Montreal Canadiens	1–3	Toronto St. Pats	7–5–0	14
13	January 28	Ottawa Senators	2–1	Toronto St. Pats	7–6–0	14

February

Game	Date	Visitor	Score	Home	Record	Pts
14	February 1	Toronto St. Pats	5–4	Hamilton Tigers	8–6–0	16
15	February 4	Montreal Canadiens	1–3	Toronto St. Pats	9–6–0	18
16	February 8	Toronto St. Pats	4–6	Montreal Canadiens	9–7–0	18
17	February 11	Toronto St. Pats	4–4	Ottawa Senators	9–7–1	19
18	February 15	Hamilton Tigers	4–6	Toronto St. Pats	10–7–1	21
19	February 18	Toronto St. Pats	4–6	Montreal Canadiens	10–8–1	21
20	February 22	Toronto St. Pats	3–4	Hamilton Tigers	10–9–1	21
21	February 25	Ottawa Senators	5–7	Toronto St. Pats	11–9–1	23

March

Game	Date	Visitor	Score	Home	Record	Pts
22	March 1	Toronto St. Pats	3–2	Ottawa Senators	12–9–1	25
23	March 4	Hamilton Tigers	4–8	Toronto St. Pats	13–9–1	27
24	March 8	Montreal Canadiens	8–7	Toronto St. Pats	13–10–1	27

Legend: Win (2 points) Loss (0 points) Tie (1 point)

=== Playoffs ===
1922 Stanley Cup playoffs
NHL championship vs. (1) Ottawa Senators – St. Patricks win 5 goals to 4 goals

Game	Date	Visitor	Score	Home	Series
1	March 11	Ottawa Senators	4–5	Toronto St. Pats	1–0
2	March 13	Toronto St. Pats	0–0	Ottawa Senators	1–0–1

Stanley Cup Finals vs. Vancouver Millionaires – St. Patricks win 3–2

Game	Date	Visitor	Score	Home	Series
1	March 17	Vancouver Millionaires	4–3	Toronto St. Pats	0–1
2	March 20	Toronto St. Pats	2–1	Vancouver Millionaires	1–1
3	March 23	Vancouver Millionaires	3–0	Toronto St. Pats	1–2
4	March 25	Toronto St. Pats	6–0	Vancouver Millionaires	2–2
5	March 28	Toronto St. Pats	5–1	Vancouver Millionaires	3–2

Legend: Win Loss

== Player statistics ==
=== Regular season ===
Scoring

Player	GP	G	A	Pts	PIM
Babe Dye	24	31	7	38	39
Harry Cameron	24	18	17	35	22
Corb Denneny	24	19	9	28	28
Reg Noble	24	17	11	28	19
Ken Randall	24	10	6	16	32
Red Stuart	24	3	7	10	16
Lloyd Andrews	11	0	0	0	0
Stan Jackson	1	0	0	0	0
Ivan Mitchell	2	0	0	0	0
Paddy Nolan	2	0	0	0	0
John Ross Roach	22	0	0	0	0
Glenn Smith	9	0	0	0	0
Rod Smylie	20	0	0	0	2
Ted Stackhouse	13	0	0	0	2

Goaltending

Player	MIN	GP	W	L	T	GA	GAA	SA	SV	SV%	SO
John Ross Roach	1340	22	11	10	1	91	4.07				0
Ivan Mitchell	120	2	2	0	0	6	3.00				0
Team:	1460	24	13	10	1	97	3.99				0

=== Playoffs ===
Scoring

Player	GP	G	A	Pts	PIM
Babe Dye	2	2	0	2	2
Red Stuart	2	1	1	2	0
Harry Cameron	2	0	2	2	8
Corb Denneny	2	1	0	1	0
Ken Randall	2	1	0	1	4
Lloyd Andrews	2	0	0	0	0
Reg Noble	2	0	0	0	12
John Ross Roach	2	0	0	0	0
Rod Smylie	1	0	0	0	2
Ted Stackhouse	1	0	0	0	0

Goaltending

Player	MIN	GP	W	L	T	GA	GAA	SA	SV	SV%	SO
John Ross Roach	120	2	1	0	1	4	2.00				1
Team:	120	2	1	0	1	4	2.00				1

Note:

Pos = Position;GP = Games played; G = Goals; A = Assists; Pts = Points; PIM = Penalty minutes; +/- = Plus/minus; PPG = Power-play goals; SHG = Short-handed goals; GWG = Game-winning goals
Pos = Position;GP = Games played; Min, TOI = Minutes played; W = Wins; L = Losses; T,T/OT = Ties; OTL = Overtime losses; GA = Goals-against; GAA = Goals-against average; SO = Shutouts; SA = Shots against; SV = Shots saved;SV% = Save percentage;

== Awards and records ==
- O'Brien Cup – NHL league champions

== Transactions ==
- November 9, 1921: Traded Cully Wilson to Hamilton Tigers for Ed Carpenter
- December 5, 1921: Lost Free Agent Ivan Mitchell to Hamilton Tigers
- December 16, 1921: Signed Free Agent Glenn Smith
- December 23, 1921: Signed Free Agents Paddy Nolan, Stan Jackson and Ted Stackhouse
- January 22, 1922: Released Ted Stackhouse
- January 25, 1922: Signed Free Agent Ted Stackhouse
- May 27, 1922: Traded Jake Forbes to Hamilton Tigers for cash

== See also ==
- 1921–22 NHL season

== Sources ==
- SHRP Sports
- The Internet Hockey Database
- Rauzulu's Street
- Goalies Archive
- National Hockey League Guide & Record Book 2007
