= 1921–22 Ottawa Senators season =

Club's 37th season of play, fifth season in the NHL

1921–22 Ottawa Senators
- League: 1st NHL
- 1921–22 record: 14–8–2
- Home record: 9–3–1
- Road record: 5–5–1
- Goals for: 106
- Goals against: 84

Team information
- General manager: Tommy Gorman
- Coach: Pete Green
- Captain: Eddie Gerard
- Arena: The Arena

Team leaders
- Goals: Punch Broadbent (32)
- Assists: Punch Broadbent (14)
- Points: Punch Broadbent (46)
- Penalty minutes: Punch Broadbent (24)
- Wins: Clint Benedict (14)
- Goals against average: Clint Benedict (3.34)

The 1921–22 Ottawa Senators season was the club's 37th season of play, fifth season in the NHL, and they were coming off back-to-back Stanley Cup Championship seasons, winning in 1920 and 1921. The Senators would finish in first place in the standings, but lost in the playoff to the Toronto St. Pats.

== Regular season ==
Punch Broadbent emerged as the offensive leader for the Senators, leading the NHL in goals (32) and points (46). He scored in an NHL record 16 straight games. Teammate Cy Denneny finished in 2nd in NHL scoring with 39 points, and 3rd in goals at 27.

On February 1, former Senators player Sprague Cleghorn, then on the Montreal Canadiens, cut Senators players Eddie Gerard and Cy Denneny, while taking a charge at Frank Nighbor. All 3 players missed 2 games due to the injuries they occurred, while Cleghorn was given a match penalty and fined $15 by the league.

Clint Benedict once again had a great season, winning an NHL best 14 games, while leading the league with a 3.34 GAA.

On February 11, 1922, the Senators and the Toronto St. Pats made NHL history, as the teams played to a 4–4 draw, the first time in NHL history that a game ended in a tie.

=== December ===
- **December 17** – The Senators opened the 1921–22 season on the road at Barton Street Arena against the Hamilton Tigers. Punch Broadbent led the Senators, scoring the overtime winning goal and adding an assist, in a 3–2 victory.
- **December 21** – Ottawa hosted the Toronto St. Patricks for their home opener. Eddie Gerard scored three goals, however, the St. Patricks Babe Dye scored the tie-breaking goal midway through the third period, as Ottawa dropped the game to Toronto by a score of 5–4.
- **December 24** – The Montreal Canadiens came to Ottawa for a Christmas Eve match against the Senators. Cy Denneny scored three goals and added an assist, Morley Bruce scored twice and Punch Broadbent had a goal and three assists as Ottawa crushed Montreal 10–0. Clint Benedict earned the shutout.
- **December 28** – The Senators made their first visit of the season to Mount Royal Arena as they faced the Montreal Canadiens in the second game of a home-and-home series. Punch Broadbent scored the overtime winning goal, as Clint Benedict allowed only one goal in a 2–1 Senators victory.
- **December 31** – Ottawa was back on home ice to face the Hamilton Tigers for a New Year's Eve game. Cy Denneny scored two goals and added an assist, while Clint Benedict earned his second shutout of the season, as Ottawa defeated Hamilton 4–0.

Ottawa earned a record of 4–1–0 during December, getting eight points. The Senators sat in first place in the NHL, two points ahead of the second place St. Patricks.

=== January ===
- **January 4** – Ottawa opened the New Year with a road game at Mutual Street Arena to face the Toronto St. Patricks. Cy Denneny had a goal and an assist, however, Billy Stuart of Toronto broke the tie with a late third period goal, as Toronto defeated Ottawa 3–2.
- **January 7** – Ottawa was on the road for a game against the Montreal Canadiens. Punch Broadbent scored twice while Georges Boucher earned two assists, leading the Senators to a 4–2 win over Montreal.
- **January 11** – The Senators returned to home ice for a first-place clash against the Toronto St. Patricks, as both clubs had a 5–2–0 record heading into the game. Georges Boucher and Cy Denneny each scored twice, leading the Senators to a convincing 7–2 win over the St. Patricks, and take over first place in the NHL standings.
- **January 14** – The Senators travelled to Toronto for the second game of a home-and-home series. With the game tied at 2–2 in the third period, Cy Denneny broke the tie to give the Senators the lead with his second goal of the game. Punch Broadbent then scored two goals, as Ottawa defeated Toronto 5–2.
- **January 18** – Ottawa returned home to host the Montreal Canadiens. Punch Broadbent and Cy Denneny each scored three goals, while Eddie Gerard added three assists, as the Senators defeated the Canadiens in a very high-scoring game 10–6. Odie Cleghorn scored four goals for the Canadiens.
- **January 21** – The Senators were back on the road for a visit against the Hamilton Tigers. The Senators held a 4–1 lead after the first period, however, the Tigers stormed back and won the game as Mickey Roach scored the overtime winner to take the victory 7–6. Punch Broadbent had three goals and an assist in the losing effort.
- **January 25** – Ottawa was back on home ice for the second game of a home-and-home series against the Hamilton Tigers. Cy Denneny and Punch Broadbent each scored twice, leading Ottawa to a 4–2 victory.
- **January 28** – Ottawa headed to Toronto for a matchup against the Toronto St. Patricks. Punch Broadbent scored two second period goals as the Senators held on to defeat the St. Patricks 2–1 after a strong goaltending performance from Clint Benedict.

The Sens had a record of 6–2–0 in the month of January. Overall, the Senators had a 10–3–0 record, earning 20 points on the season, and in first place in the NHL. They were six points ahead of the second place St. Patricks.

=== February ===
- **February 1** – Ottawa travelled to Montreal for a game against the Montreal Canadiens. Punch Broadbent and Frank Boucher each scored twice, as Ottawa defeated Montreal 4–2. During the game, former Senators player Sprague Cleghorn accumulated 29 minutes of penalties for the Canadiens.
- **February 4** – The Senators hosted the Hamilton Tigers. Ottawa stormed out to a 6–0 lead, however, the Tigers scored four goals in 2:30 late in the second period to cut the lead to 6–4. Ottawa pulled away in the third period, winning the game 10–6. King Clancy scored two goals and added two assists, while Georges Boucher, Frank Boucher and Leth Graham each scored twice.
- **February 8** – The Senators faced the Hamilton Tigers again, this time on the road. Punch Broadbent scored the lone Ottawa goal, as the Tigers, led by three goals and an assist by Mickey Roach and three goals by Joe Malone, crushed the Senators 9–1, snapping Ottawa's four game winning streak.
- **February 11** – Ottawa was back on home ice for a meeting against the Toronto St. Patricks. The Senators held a 4–1 lead late in the second period, however, the St. Patricks scored three unanswered goals to tie the game at 4–4. There was no scoring in overtime, as this marked the first ever tie game in NHL history. Georges Boucher scored twice in the tie.
- **February 15** – The Senators were on the road for a game against the Montreal Canadiens. Ottawa took a 6–2 lead with 3:30 left in the second period, however, the Canadiens scored four times to tie the game. For the second straight game, overtime settled nothing, as the teams skated to a 6–6 tie. Punch Broadbent scored twice while Eddie Gerard scored a goal and added two assists.
- **February 18** – Ottawa continued their road trip with a game against the Hamilton Tigers. Frank Nighbor scored a goal and added two assists, as Ottawa snapped a three game winless streak with a 4–2 victory.
- **February 22** – Ottawa returned home to face the Montreal Canadiens. Punch Broadbent scored twice and added an assist, as the Senators held off the Canadiens for a 4–3 victory. The win improved Ottawa's record to 14–4–2 and clinch first place in the NHL standings, earning a berth in the O'Brien Cup.
- **February 25** – The Senators travelled to Toronto for a road game against the second place Toronto St. Patricks. Cy Denneny scored four goals, however, Reg Noble scored twice and added four assists for Toronto, as the St. Patricks defeated Ottawa 7–5.

The team finished February with a 4–2–2 record in eight games. The Senators overall win–loss record was 14–5–2, earning 30 points and clinching first place in the NHL.

=== March ===
- **March 1** – The Senators opened March with a home game against the Toronto St. Patricks in the second game of a home-and-home series. Cy Denneny and Eddie Gerard recorded goals for the Senators, but the St. Patricks defeated Ottawa 3–2.
- **March 4** – Ottawa travelled to face the Montreal Canadiens for their final road game of the regular season. The Senators, resting some of their regular players, lost to the Canadiens 2–1. Cy Denneny scored the lone goal for Ottawa.
- **March 8** – The Senators concluded the regular season with a home game against the Hamilton Tigers. The Senators once again rested some of their regular players in preparation for the playoffs. Punch Broadbent and Eddie Gerard scored for Ottawa, however, Mickey Roach scored three goals and added two assists for Hamilton, as the Senators lost the game 7–2.

Ottawa had a 0–3–0 record in March. Overall, the club finished with the best record in the NHL, with a 14–8–2 record.

=== Final standings ===
National Hockey League
	GP	W	L	T	Pts	GF	GA
**Ottawa Senators**	24	14	8	2	30	106	84
**Toronto St. Patricks**	24	13	10	1	27	98	97
Montreal Canadiens	24	12	11	1	25	88	94
Hamilton Tigers	24	7	17	0	14	88	105

Note: GP = Games played, W = Wins, L = Losses, T = Ties, Pts = Points, GF = Goals for, GA = Goals against
Teams that qualified for the playoffs are highlighted in bold.

=== Record vs. opponents ===
1921–22 NHL Records
Team	HAM	MTL	OTT	TOR
Hamilton	—	1–7	3–5	3–5
Montreal	7–1	—	1–6–1	4–4
Ottawa	5–3	6–1–1	—	3–4–1
Toronto	5–3	4–4	4–3–1	—

== Schedule and results ==
1921–22 regular season
December: 4–1–0 (home: 2–1–0; road: 2–0–0)

Game	Date	Visitor	Score	Home	OT	Decision	Attendance	Arena	Record	Pts	Recap
1	December 17	Ottawa	3–2	Hamilton		Benedict	N/A	Barton Street Arena	1–0–0	2	
2	December 21	Toronto	5–4	Ottawa		Benedict	N/A	The Arena	1–1–0	2	
3	December 24	Montreal	0–10	Ottawa		Benedict	N/A	The Arena	2–1–0	4	
4	December 28	Ottawa	2–1	Montreal	OT	Benedict	N/A	Mount Royal Arena	3–1–0	6	
5	December 31	Hamilton	0–4	Ottawa		Benedict	N/A	The Arena	4–1–0	8	

January: 6–2–0 (home: 3–0–0; road: 3–2–0)

Game	Date	Visitor	Score	Home	OT	Decision	Attendance	Arena	Record	Pts	Recap
6	January 4	Ottawa	2–3	Toronto		Benedict	N/A	Arena Gardens	4–2–0	8	
7	January 7	Ottawa	4–2	Montreal		Benedict	N/A	Mount Royal Arena	5–2–0	10	
8	January 11	Toronto	2–7	Ottawa		Benedict	N/A	The Arena	6–2–0	12	
9	January 14	Ottawa	5–2	Toronto		Benedict	N/A	Arena Gardens	7–2–0	14	
10	January 18	Montreal	6–10	Ottawa		Benedict	N/A	The Arena	8–2–0	16	
11	January 21	Ottawa	6–7	Hamilton	OT	Benedict	N/A	Barton Street Arena	8–3–0	16	
12	January 25	Hamilton	2–4	Ottawa		Benedict	N/A	The Arena	9–3–0	18	
13	January 28	Ottawa	2–1	Toronto		Benedict	N/A	Arena Gardens	10–3–0	20	

February: 4–2–2 (home: 3–0–1; road: 1–2–1)

Game	Date	Visitor	Score	Home	OT	Decision	Attendance	Arena	Record	Pts	Recap
14	February 1	Montreal	2–4	Ottawa		Benedict	N/A	The Arena	11–3–0	22	
15	February 4	Hamilton	6–10	Ottawa		Benedict	N/A	The Arena	12–3–0	24	
16	February 8	Ottawa	1–9	Hamilton		Benedict	N/A	Barton Street Arena	12–4–0	24	
17	February 11	Toronto	4–4	Ottawa	OT	Benedict	N/A	The Arena	12–4–1	25	
18	February 15	Ottawa	6–6	Montreal	OT	Benedict	N/A	Mount Royal Arena	12–4–2	26	
19	February 18	Ottawa	4–2	Hamilton		Benedict	N/A	Barton Street Arena	13–4–2	28	
20	February 22	Montreal	3–4	Ottawa		Benedict	N/A	The Arena	14–4–2	30	
21	February 25	Ottawa	5–7	Toronto		Benedict	N/A	Arena Gardens	14–5–2	30	

March: 0–3–0 (home: 0–2–0; road: 0–1–0)

Game	Date	Visitor	Score	Home	OT	Decision	Attendance	Arena	Record	Pts	Recap
22	March 1	Toronto	3–2	Ottawa		Benedict	N/A	The Arena	14–6–2	30	
23	March 4	Ottawa	1–2	Montreal		Benedict	N/A	Mount Royal Arena	14–7–2	30	
24	March 8	Hamilton	7–2	Ottawa		Benedict	N/A	The Arena	14–8–2	30	

Legend: Win (2 points) Loss (0 points) Tie (1 point)

== Playoffs ==
Toronto St. Patricks 5, Ottawa Senators 4

The Senators would once again play for the O'Brien Cup, where they would face the Toronto St. Patricks in a two game total goal series.

- Game 1 - The series opened on March 11 in Toronto. The St. Patricks took a very early 2–0 lead, with two goals in the first 3:05 of the game. The Senators responded with three straight goals, as Frank Nighbor scored 7:05 into the game, followed by two goals by Cy Denneny, to give Ottawa a 3–2 lead heading into the first intermission. The St. Pats tied the game with a goal by Babe Dye 8:30 into the second period, however, Ottawa regained the lead as Frank Nighbor scored his second of the game, giving the Senators a 4–3 lead. Dye would once again tie the game with a very late goal, as the two teams were tied 4–4 after two periods. In the third period, the St. Patricks Corb Denneny scored the game winning goal with five minutes remaining in the game, giving the St. Patricks a 5–4 series lead after the first game.
- Game 2 - The series moved to Ottawa for the second game on March 13. It was a very defensive contest, as Ottawa could not break through and the two teams fought to a 0–0 tie. With this result, Toronto won the series 5 goals to 4 and would represent the NHL at the 1922 Stanley Cup Finals.

1922 Stanley Cup playoffs
NHL championship vs. (2) Toronto St. Patricks – St. Patricks win 5 goals to 4 goals

Game	Date	Visitor	Score	Home	OT	Decision	Attendance	Arena	Series	Recap
1	March 11	Ottawa	4–5	Toronto		Benedict	N/A	Mutual Street Arena	4–5	
2	March 13	Toronto	0–0	Ottawa		Benedict	N/A	The Arena	4–5	

Legend: Win Loss Tie

== Playing statistics ==
=== Scoring leaders ===
Player	GP	G	A	Pts	PIM
Punch Broadbent	24	32	14	46	24
Cy Denneny	22	27	12	39	18
Buck Boucher	23	12	8	20	10
Frank Nighbor	20	8	8	16	2
Eddie Gerard	21	7	9	16	16

=== Goaltending ===
Player	GP	Min	W	L	T	GA	SO	GAA
Clint Benedict	24	1510	14	8	2	84	2	3.34

Note:

Pos = Position;GP = Games played; G = Goals; A = Assists; Pts = Points; PIM = Penalty minutes; +/- = Plus/minus; PPG = Power-play goals; SHG = Short-handed goals; GWG = Game-winning goals
Pos = Position;GP = Games played; Min, TOI = Minutes played; W = Wins; L = Losses; T,T/OT = Ties; OTL = Overtime losses; GA = Goals-against; GAA = Goals-against average; SO = Shutouts; SA = Shots against; SV = Shots saved;SV% = Save percentage;

== Transactions ==
The Senators were involved in the following transactions during the 1921–22 season.

=== Trades ===
December 2, 1921	To Ottawa Senators Cash	To Saskatoon Sheiks (WCHL) Leth Graham

=== Free agents ===
December 6, 1921	From Banff (RMSHL) Frank Boucher
December 11, 1921	From Saskatoon Sheiks (WCHL) Leth Graham
December 14, 1921	From Ottawa St. Brigid's (OCHL) King Clancy

== See also ==
- 1921–22 NHL season
