= List of NHL goal scoring leaders by season =

This is a list of top goal-scorers by season in the National Hockey League. Players marked with a dagger (†) are active, while players inducted into the Hockey Hall of Fame are marked with an asterisk (*).

== List ==
Season	Top scorer(s)	Team	Goals	GP	G/GP	Ref
1917–18	Joe Malone (1) *	Montreal Canadiens	44	20	2.2	
1918–19	Newsy Lalonde (1) *	Montreal Canadiens	23	17	1.35	
1919–20	Joe Malone (2) *	Quebec Athletics	39	24	1.63	
1920–21	Babe Dye (1) *	Multiple teams	35	24	1.46	
1921–22	Punch Broadbent (1) *	Ottawa Senators	31	24	1.29	
1921–22	Babe Dye (2) *	Toronto St. Patricks	31	24	1.29	
1922–23	Babe Dye (3) *	Toronto St. Patricks	27	22	1.23	
1923–24	Cy Denneny (1) *	Ottawa Senators	22	22	1	
1924–25	Babe Dye (4) *	Toronto St. Patricks	38	29	1.31	
1925–26	Nels Stewart (1) *	Montreal Maroons	34	36	0.94	
1926–27	Bill Cook (1) *	New York Rangers	33	44	0.75	
1927–28	Howie Morenz (1) *	Montreal Canadiens	33	43	0.77	
1928–29	Ace Bailey (1) *	Toronto Maple Leafs	22	44	0.5	
1929–30	Cooney Weiland (1) *	Boston Bruins	43	44	0.98	
1930–31	Charlie Conacher (1) *	Toronto Maple Leafs	31	38	0.82	
1931–32	Charlie Conacher (2) *	Toronto Maple Leafs	34	44	0.77	
1932–33	Bill Cook (2) *	New York Rangers	28	48	0.58	
1933–34	Charlie Conacher (3) *	Toronto Maple Leafs	32	42	0.76	
1934–35	Charlie Conacher (4) *	Toronto Maple Leafs	36	47	0.77	
1935–36	Charlie Conacher (5) *	Toronto Maple Leafs	23	44	0.52	
1935–36	Bill Thoms (1)	Toronto Maple Leafs	23	48	0.48	
1936–37	Larry Aurie (1)	Detroit Red Wings	23	45	0.51	
1936–37	Nels Stewart (2) *	Multiple teams	23	43	0.53	
1937–38	Gordie Drillon (1) *	Toronto Maple Leafs	26	48	0.54	
1938–39	Roy Conacher (1) *	Boston Bruins	26	47	0.55	
1939–40	Bryan Hextall (1) *	New York Rangers	24	48	0.5	
1940–41	Bryan Hextall (2) *	New York Rangers	26	48	0.54	
1941–42	Lynn Patrick (1) *	New York Rangers	32	47	0.68	
1942–43	Doug Bentley (1) *	Chicago Black Hawks	33	50	0.66	
1943–44	Doug Bentley (2) *	Chicago Black Hawks	38	50	0.76	
1944–45	Maurice Richard (1) *	Montreal Canadiens	50	50	1	
1945–46	Gaye Stewart (1)	Toronto Maple Leafs	37	50	0.74	
1946–47	Maurice Richard (2) *	Montreal Canadiens	45	60	0.75	
1947–48	Ted Lindsay (1) *	Detroit Red Wings	33	60	0.55	
1948–49	Sid Abel (1) *	Detroit Red Wings	28	60	0.47	
1949–50	Maurice Richard (3) *	Montreal Canadiens	43	70	0.61	
1950–51	Gordie Howe (1) *	Detroit Red Wings	43	70	0.61	
1951–52	Gordie Howe (2) *	Detroit Red Wings	47	70	0.67	
1952–53	Gordie Howe (3) *	Detroit Red Wings	49	70	0.7	
1953–54	Maurice Richard (4) *	Montreal Canadiens	37	70	0.53	
1954–55	Bernie Geoffrion (1) *	Montreal Canadiens	38	70	0.54	
1954–55	Maurice Richard (5) *	Montreal Canadiens	38	67	0.57	
1955–56	Jean Beliveau (1) *	Montreal Canadiens	47	70	0.67	
1956–57	Gordie Howe (4) *	Detroit Red Wings	44	70	0.63	
1957–58	Dickie Moore (1) *	Montreal Canadiens	36	70	0.51	
1958–59	Jean Beliveau (2) *	Montreal Canadiens	45	64	0.7	
1959–60	Bronco Horvath (1)	Boston Bruins	39	68	0.57	
1959–60	Bobby Hull (1) *	Chicago Black Hawks	39	70	0.56	
1960–61	Bernie Geoffrion (2) *	Montreal Canadiens	50	64	0.78	
1961–62	Bobby Hull (2) *	Chicago Black Hawks	50	70	0.71	
1962–63	Gordie Howe (5) *	Detroit Red Wings	38	70	0.54	
1963–64	Bobby Hull (3) *	Chicago Black Hawks	43	70	0.61	
1964–65	Norm Ullman (1) *	Detroit Red Wings	42	70	0.6	
1965–66	Bobby Hull (4) *	Chicago Black Hawks	54	65	0.83	
1966–67	Bobby Hull (5) *	Chicago Black Hawks	52	66	0.79	
1967–68	Bobby Hull (6) *	Chicago Black Hawks	44	71	0.62	
1968–69	Bobby Hull (7) *	Chicago Black Hawks	58	74	0.78	
1969–70	Phil Esposito (1) *	Boston Bruins	43	76	0.57	
1970–71	Phil Esposito (2) *	Boston Bruins	76	78	0.97	
1971–72	Phil Esposito (3) *	Boston Bruins	66	76	0.87	
1972–73	Phil Esposito (4) *	Boston Bruins	55	78	0.71	
1973–74	Phil Esposito (5) *	Boston Bruins	68	78	0.87	
1974–75	Phil Esposito (6) *	Boston Bruins	61	79	0.77	
1975–76	Reggie Leach (1)	Philadelphia Flyers	61	80	0.76	
1976–77	Steve Shutt (1) *	Montreal Canadiens	60	80	0.75	
1977–78	Guy Lafleur (1) *	Montreal Canadiens	60	78	0.77	
1978–79	Mike Bossy (1) *	New York Islanders	69	80	0.86	
1979–80	Danny Gare (1)	Buffalo Sabres	56	76	0.74	
1979–80	Charlie Simmer (1)	Los Angeles Kings	56	64	0.88	
1979–80	Blaine Stoughton (1)	Hartford Whalers	56	80	0.7	
1980–81	Mike Bossy (2) *	New York Islanders	68	79	0.86	
1981–82	Wayne Gretzky (1) *	Edmonton Oilers	92	80	1.15	
1982–83	Wayne Gretzky (2) *	Edmonton Oilers	71	80	0.89	
1983–84	Wayne Gretzky (3) *	Edmonton Oilers	87	74	1.18	
1984–85	Wayne Gretzky (4) *	Edmonton Oilers	73	80	0.91	
1985–86	Jari Kurri (1) *	Edmonton Oilers	68	78	0.87	
1986–87	Wayne Gretzky (5) *	Edmonton Oilers	62	79	0.78	
1987–88	Mario Lemieux (1) *	Pittsburgh Penguins	70	77	0.91	
1988–89	Mario Lemieux (2) *	Pittsburgh Penguins	85	76	1.12	
1989–90	Brett Hull (1) *	St. Louis Blues	72	80	0.9	
1990–91	Brett Hull (2) *	St. Louis Blues	86	78	1.1	
1991–92	Brett Hull (3) *	St. Louis Blues	70	73	0.96	
1992–93	Alexander Mogilny (1) *	Buffalo Sabres	76	77	0.99	
1992–93	Teemu Selanne (1) *	Winnipeg Jets	76	84	0.9	
1993–94	Pavel Bure (1) *	Vancouver Canucks	60	76	0.81	
1994–95	Peter Bondra (1)	Washington Capitals	34	47	0.72	
1995–96	Mario Lemieux (3) *	Pittsburgh Penguins	69	70	0.99	
1996–97	Keith Tkachuk (1)	Phoenix Coyotes	52	81	0.64	
1997–98	Peter Bondra (2)	Washington Capitals	52	76	0.68	
1997–98	Teemu Selänne (2) *	Mighty Ducks of Anaheim	52	73	0.71	
Maurice "Rocket" Richard Trophy
1998–99	Teemu Selanne (3) *	Mighty Ducks of Anaheim	47	75	0.63	
1999–2000	Pavel Bure (2) *	Florida Panthers	58	74	0.78	
2000–01	Pavel Bure (3) *	Florida Panthers	59	82	0.72	
2001–02	Jarome Iginla (1) *	Calgary Flames	52	82	0.63	
2002–03	Milan Hejduk (1)	Colorado Avalanche	50	82	0.61	
2003–04	Jarome Iginla (2) *	Calgary Flames	41	81	0.51	
2003–04	Ilya Kovalchuk (1)	Atlanta Thrashers	41	81	0.51	
2003–04	Rick Nash (1)	Columbus Blue Jackets	41	80	0.51	
2004–05	Season canceled due to lockout					
2005–06	Jonathan Cheechoo (1)	San Jose Sharks	56	82	0.68	
2006–07	Vincent Lecavalier (1)	Tampa Bay Lightning	52	82	0.63	
2007–08	Alexander Ovechkin (1) ^{†}	Washington Capitals	65	82	0.79	
2008–09	Alexander Ovechkin (2) ^{†}	Washington Capitals	56	79	0.71	
2009–10	Sidney Crosby (1) ^{†}	Pittsburgh Penguins	51	81	0.63	
2009–10	Steven Stamkos (1) ^{†}	Tampa Bay Lightning	51	82	0.62	
2010–11	Corey Perry (1) ^{†}	Anaheim Ducks	50	82	0.61	
2011–12	Steven Stamkos (2) ^{†}	Tampa Bay Lightning	60	82	0.73	
2012–13	Alexander Ovechkin (3) ^{†}	Washington Capitals	32	48	0.67	
2013–14	Alexander Ovechkin (4) ^{†}	Washington Capitals	51	78	0.65	
2014–15	Alexander Ovechkin (5) ^{†}	Washington Capitals	53	81	0.65	
2015–16	Alexander Ovechkin (6) ^{†}	Washington Capitals	50	79	0.63	
2016–17	Sidney Crosby (2) ^{†}	Pittsburgh Penguins	44	75	0.59	
2017–18	Alexander Ovechkin (7) ^{†}	Washington Capitals	49	82	0.6	
2018–19	Alexander Ovechkin (8) ^{†}	Washington Capitals	51	81	0.63	
2019–20	Alexander Ovechkin (9) ^{†}	Washington Capitals	48	68	0.71	
2019–20	David Pastrnak (1) ^{†}	Boston Bruins	48	70	0.69	
2020–21	Auston Matthews (1) ^{†}	Toronto Maple Leafs	41	52	0.79	
2021–22	Auston Matthews (2) ^{†}	Toronto Maple Leafs	60	73	0.82	
2022–23	Connor McDavid (1) ^{†}	Edmonton Oilers	64	82	0.78	
2023–24	Auston Matthews (3) ^{†}	Toronto Maple Leafs	69	81	0.85	
2024–25	Leon Draisaitl (1) ^{†}	Edmonton Oilers	52	71	0.73	
2025–26	Nathan MacKinnon (1) ^{†}	Colorado Avalanche	53	80	0.66	

Rank	Player	Seasons with most goals	Seasons
1	Alexander Ovechkin	9	2007–08, 2008–09, 2012–13, 2013–14, 2014–15, 2015–16, 2017–18, 2018–19, 2019–20
2	Bobby Hull	7	1959-60, 1961-62, 1963–64, 1965–66, 1966–67, 1967–68, 1968–69,
3	Phil Esposito	6	1969–70, 1970–71, 1971–72, 1972–73, 1973–74, 1974–75
4	Charlie Conacher	5	1930-31, 1931-32, 1933-34, 1934-35, 1935-36
5	Maurice Richard	5	1944-45, 1946-47, 1949-50, 1953-54, 1954-55
6	Gordie Howe	5	1950–51, 1951–52, 1952–53, 1956-57, 1963–63
7	Wayne Gretzky	5	1981–82, 1982–83, 1983–84, 1984–85, 1986–87
8	Babe Dye	4	1920-21, 1921-22, 1922-24, 1924-25
9	Brett Hull	3	1989–90, 1990–91, 1991–92
10	Mario Lemieux	3	1987–88, 1988–89, 1995-96
11	Teemu Selanne	3	1992–93, 1997-98, 1998-99
12	Pavel Bure	3	1993-1994, 1999–2000, 2000–01
13	Auston Matthews	3	2020–21, 2021–22, 2023–24
14	Joe Malone	2	1917-18. 1919-20
15	Bill Cook	2	1926-27, 1932-33
16	Bryan Hextall	2	1939-40, 1940-41
17	Doug Bentley	2	1942-43, 1943-44
18	Jean Beliveau	2	1955-56, 1958-59
19	Bernie Geoffrion	2	1954-55, 1960-62
20	Mike Bossy	2	1978-79, 1980-81
21	Peter Bondra	2	1994–95, 1997–98
22	Jarome Iginla	2	2001–02, 2003–04
23	Steven Stamkos	2	2009–10, 2011–12
24	Sidney Crosby	2	2009–10, 2016–17

== See also ==
- List of past NHL scoring leaders
- Maurice "Rocket" Richard Trophy
