= 1921–22 Montreal Canadiens season =

NHL hockey team season

1921–22 Montreal Canadiens
- League: 3rd NHL
- 1921–22 record: 12–11–1
- Home record: 8–3–1
- Road record: 4–8–0
- Goals for: 112
- Goals against: 99

Team information
- General manager: Leo Dandurand
- Coach: Leo Dandurand
- Captain: Sprague Cleghorn
- Arena: Mount Royal Arena

Team leaders
- Goals: Odie Cleghorn (21)
- Assists: Sprague Cleghorn (9)
- Points: Sprague Cleghorn (26)
- Penalty minutes: Sprague Cleghorn (80)
- Wins: Georges Vezina (12)
- Goals against average: Georges Vezina (3.84)

The 1921–22 Montreal Canadiens season was the team's 13th season and fifth as a member of the National Hockey League (NHL). The Canadiens, for the third season in a row, did not qualify for the playoffs for the first time since the 1910–11 season and the 1912–13 season, finishing third.

Billy Coutu returned to the Canadiens. Other additions included Odie Cleghorn's brother Sprague Cleghorn, Bill Boucher, Edmond Bouchard and Phil Stevens. Dave Ritchie retired and Cully Wilson joined the Hamilton Tigers.

Prior to the start of this season, the NHL's first multiple-player trade in its history was made when Billy Coutu and Sprague Cleghorn of the Hamilton Tigers were traded to the Montreal Canadiens for Harry Mummery, Amos Arbour and Cully Wilson.

Canadiens owner George Kennedy never recovered from the influenza he contracted in 1919, and died on October 19, 1921, at age 39. His widow sold the Canadiens to a unit that would be known affectionately as the Three Musketeers of owners, Leo Dandurand, Louis Letourneau, and Joseph Cattarinich. Dandurand became manager and coach, and immediately there were problems between him and Newsy Lalonde. At one point, Dandurand accused Lalonde of not trying, and also the fans started to boo their old hero. Finally, Lalonde walked out on the team. NHL president Frank Calder mediated the dispute and Lalonde returned to the team. But his days in Montreal were numbered.

== Regular season ==
Georges Vezina came third in the league in goals against average of 3.9 per game. Odie Cleghorn led the Canadiens in offence, scoring 21 goals and 3 assists.

=== Final standings ===
National Hockey League
	GP	W	L	T	Pts	GF	GA
**Ottawa Senators**	24	14	8	2	30	106	84
**Toronto St. Patricks**	24	13	10	1	27	98	97
Montreal Canadiens	24	12	11	1	25	88	94
Hamilton Tigers	24	7	17	0	14	88	105

Note: GP = Games played, W = Wins, L = Losses, T = Ties, Pts = Points, GF = Goals for, GA = Goals against
Teams that qualified for the playoffs are highlighted in bold.

=== Record vs. opponents ===
1921–22 NHL Records
Team	HAM	MTL	OTT	TOR
Hamilton	—	1–7	3–5	3–5
Montreal	7–1	—	1–6–1	4–4
Ottawa	5–3	6–1–1	—	3–4–1
Toronto	5–3	4–4	4–3–1	—

== Schedule and results ==
1921–22 regular season
December

Game	Result	Date	Score	Opponent	Record
1	L	December 17, 1921	2–5	@ Toronto St. Patricks (1921–22)	0–1–0
2	W	December 21, 1921	3–1	Hamilton Tigers (1921–22)	1–1–0
3	L	December 24, 1921	0–10	@ Ottawa Senators (1921–22)	1–2–0
4	L	December 28, 1921	1–2 OT	Ottawa Senators (1921–22)	1–3–0
5	W	December 31, 1921	5–3	Toronto St. Patricks (1921–22)	2–3–0

January

Game	Result	Date	Score	Opponent	Record
6	L	January 4, 1922	3–4	@ Hamilton Tigers (1921–22)	2–4–0
7	L	January 7, 1922	2–4	Ottawa Senators (1921–22)	2–5–0
8	W	January 11, 1922	3–2	@ Hamilton Tigers (1921–22)	3–5–0
9	W	January 14, 1922	10–6	Hamilton Tigers (1921–22)	4–5–0
10	L	January 18, 1922	6–10	@ Ottawa Senators (1921–22)	4–6–0
11	L	January 21, 1922	3–5	Toronto St. Patricks (1921–22)	4–7–0
12	L	January 25, 1922	1–3	@ Toronto St. Patricks (1921–22)	4–8–0
13	W	January 28, 1922	3–2	Hamilton Tigers (1921–22)	5–8–0

February

Game	Result	Date	Score	Opponent	Record
14	L	February 1, 1922	2–4	@ Ottawa Senators (1921–22)	5–9–0
15	L	February 4, 1922	1–3	@ Toronto St. Patricks (1921–22)	5–10–0
16	W	February 8, 1922	6–4	Toronto St. Patricks (1921–22)	6–10–0
17	W	February 11, 1922	3–1	@ Hamilton Tigers (1921–22)	7–10–0
18	T	February 15, 1922	6–6 OT	Ottawa Senators (1921–22)	7–10–1
19	W	February 18, 1922	6–4	Toronto St. Patricks (1921–22)	8–10–1
20	L	February 22, 1922	3–4	@ Ottawa Senators (1921–22)	8–11–1
21	W	February 25, 1922	6–1	Hamilton Tigers (1921–22)	9–11–1

March

Game	Result	Date	Score	Opponent	Record
22	W	March 1, 1922	3–2	@ Hamilton Tigers (1921–22)	10–11–1
23	W	March 4, 1922	2–1	Ottawa Senators (1921–22)	11–11–1
24	W	March 8, 1922	8–7	@ Toronto St. Patricks (1921–22)	12–11–1

**Legend**: Win (2 points) Loss (0 points) Tie (1 point)

== Player statistics ==
Regular season
Scoring

Player	Pos	GP	G	A	Pts	PIM
Sprague Cleghorn	D	24	17	9	26	80
Odie Cleghorn	RW/C	24	21	3	24	26
Billy Boucher	RW	24	17	5	22	18
Louis Berlinquette	LW	24	13	5	18	10
Newsy Lalonde	C	20	9	5	14	20
Bert Corbeau	D	22	3	7	10	26
Billy Coutu	D	24	4	3	7	8
Didier Pitre	RW/D	23	2	4	6	12
Edmond Bouchard	LW/D	18	1	5	6	4
Billy Bell	C/RW	6	1	0	1	0
Jack McDonald	LW	3	0	0	0	0
Phil Stevens	C/D	4	0	0	0	0
Clement Piché	?	0	0	0	0	0
Georges Vezina	G	24	0	0	0	2

Goaltending

Player	MIN	GP	W	L	T	GA	GAA	SO
Georges Vezina	1469	24	12	11	1	94	3.84	0
Sprague Cleghorn	2	1	0	0	0	0	0.00	0
Team:	1471	24	12	11	1	94	3.83	0

Note:

Pos = Position;GP = Games played; G = Goals; A = Assists; Pts = Points; PIM = Penalty minutes; +/- = Plus/minus; PPG = Power-play goals; SHG = Short-handed goals; GWG = Game-winning goals
Pos = Position;GP = Games played; Min, TOI = Minutes played; W = Wins; L = Losses; T,T/OT = Ties; OTL = Overtime losses; GA = Goals-against; GAA = Goals-against average; SO = Shutouts; SA = Shots against; SV = Shots saved;SV% = Save percentage;

Clement Piché had signed a contract with the Canadiens on December 6, 1921. Later that month, on December 21, he was slated to play versus the Hamilton Tigers. He did noy play due to the flu, yet he had been erroneously been credited with playing one shift in that game.

"A daily newspaper from yesterday announced that Piché had been sent on the ice in the game of two nights ago. That was an error, as Piché suffers from the flu and will not even be able to play Saturday night in Ottawa [the article was published on Friday]. The doctor recommended that he not go out this week and he will not be able to resume training before Sunday."

== Transactions ==
=== Trades ===
Date	From Canadiens	To Canadiens
November 15, 1921	To Hamilton Tigers	Billy Coutu(return from loan)
November 26, 1921	To Hamilton Tigers Amos Arbour, Harry Mummery	Sprague Cleghorn
January 6, 1922	To Ottawa Senators Billy Bell	(loan for season as compensation ordered by NHL for Cleghorn)

Source: "Hockey Transactions Search Results". prosportstransactions.com.

== See also ==
- 1921–22 NHL season
