= 1922 Stanley Cup Final =

1922 ice hockey championship series

	1	2	3	4	5	Total
Toronto St. Patricks (NHL)	3	2*	0	6	5	3
Vancouver Millionaires (PCHA)	4	1*	3	0	1	2
- * – Denotes overtime period(s)
- Location(s): Toronto: Arena Gardens
- Format: best-of-five
- Coaches: Toronto: George O'Donoghue; Vancouver: Frank Patrick
- Dates: March 17–28, 1922
- Series-winning goal: Babe Dye (4:20, first)
- Hall of Famers: St. Patricks: Harry Cameron (1963); Babe Dye (1970); Eddie Gerard (1945); Reg Noble (1962); Millionaires: Jack Adams (1959); Hughie Lehman (1958); Mickey MacKay (1952); Coaches: Frank Patrick (1950)

The 1922 Stanley Cup Final was contested by the National Hockey League (NHL) champion Toronto St. Patricks and the Pacific Coast Hockey Association (PCHA) champion Vancouver Millionaires. The St. Pats defeated Vancouver three games to two in the best-of-five game series to win their only Stanley Cup as the St. Pats.

This was the last Stanley Cup Final contested by a team from Vancouver until the 1982 Stanley Cup Final. All games were held at Arena Gardens in Toronto.

== Paths to the Finals ==
Vancouver finished second overall in the 1921–22 PCHA regular season standings with a 12–12 record. However, they then went on to defeat the 12–11–1 first place Seattle Metropolitans in the PCHA championship series, winning both games by 1–0.

Meanwhile, the 1921–22 NHL season was capped with the 13–10–1 second place St. Patricks defeating the 14–8–2 first place Ottawa Senators, 5–4, in the two-game total goals NHL championship series.

After defeating the WCHL's Regina Capitals in the preliminary series, the PCHA's Vancouver Millionaires travelled to Toronto for the Final.

== Game summaries ==
A fifth and deciding game five was necessary in this series to determine who would win the Cup. After Vancouver won game one, 4–3, Babe Dye scored 4:50 into overtime of game two to give Toronto a 2–1 win.It was in this game that Toronto fans got to see the penalty shot for the first time as Vancouver defenceman Art Duncan tripped Babe Dye from behind. Dye did not score on the shot. Vancouver won game three 3-0 and defenceman Harry Cameron suffered a separated shoulder and Toronto asked Frank Patrick for the use of Ottawa defenceman Eddie Gerard and Patrick permitted it. The St. Patricks tied the series in game four, 6–0, as John Ross Roach became the first rookie goaltender to record a Stanley Cup shutout. After this game, Patrick ruled Gerard ineligible. A sellout crowd jammed the Arena Gardens for game five. The game belonged to Toronto as Dye scored four goals in a 5–1 victory to clinch the Cup. Harry Cameron played despite his injury and mixed it up with Alf Skinner of Vancouver for which both players were banished with minor penalties for roughing. Reg Noble played a very good defensive game for Toronto.

For the series, Dye scored nine of the St. Pats' 16 goals, while Roach posted a 1.80 goals-against average.

March 17	Vancouver Millionaires	4–3	Toronto St. Patricks	Mutual Street Arena	Recap
Jack Adams (1) – 02:30; Jack Adams (2) – 05:30; Mickey MacKay (1) – 14:30		First period	01:07 – Babe Dye (3); 10:30 – Ken Randall (2)
No scoring		Second period	08:00 – Babe Dye (4)
Jack Adams (3) – 16:30		Third period	No scoring
Hugh Lehman		Goalie stats	John Ross Roach

March 21	Vancouver Millionaires	1–2	OT	Toronto St. Patricks	Mutual Street Arena	Recap
Jack Adams (4) – 13:00		First period		No scoring
No scoring		Second period		No scoring
No scoring		Third period		01:45 – Corb Denneny (2)
No scoring		First overtime period		04:50 – Babe Dye (5)
Hugh Lehman		Goalie stats		John Ross Roach

March 23	Vancouver Millionaires	3–0	Toronto St. Patricks	Mutual Street Arena	Recap
Lloyd Cook (1) – 15:00		First period	No scoring
Jack Adams (5) – 04:00		Second period	No scoring
Eddie Oatman (1) – 18:00		Third period	No scoring
Hugh Lehman		Goalie stats	John Ross Roach

March 25	Vancouver Millionaires	0–6	Toronto St. Patricks	Mutual Street Arena	Recap
No scoring		First period	12:00 – Lloyd Andrews (1); 15:00 - Babe Dye (6)
No scoring		Second period	06:00 – Babe Dye (7); 10:00 – Lloyd Andrews (2); 18:00 – Corb Denneny (3)
No scoring		Third period	17:00 – Rod Smylie (1)
Hugh Lehman		Goalie stats	John Ross Roach

March 28	Vancouver Millionaires	1–5	Toronto St. Patricks	Mutual Street Arena	Recap
No scoring		First period	03:00 – Babe Dye (8); 04:20 – Babe Dye (9)
No scoring		Second period	07:00 – Corb Denneny (4)
Jack Adams (6) – 18:15		Third period	01:15 – Babe Dye (10); 08:15 – Babe Dye (11)
Hugh Lehman		Goalie stats	John Ross Roach

Toronto won series 3–2

== Stanley Cup engraving ==
The 1922 Stanley Cup was presented by the trophy's trustee William Foran. The St. Patricks never did engrave their name on the Cup for their championship season.

It was not until the trophy was redesigned in 1948 that the words "1922 Toronto St. Patricks" was put onto its then-new collar.

The following St. Patricks players and staff were members of the Stanley Cup winning team.

1921–22 Toronto St. Patricks

=== Players ===
Centres

- 8 Reg Noble(Captain)
- 5 Corb Denneny‡
- 6 Ken Randall‡

Wingers

- 9 Lloyd Andrews
- 7 Cecil "Babe" Dye
- 10 Rod Smylie
- 9 Pat Nolan&
- 12 Stan Jackson&

Defencemen

- 2 Harry Cameron
- 3 Ted Stackhouse
- 4 Bill "Red" Stuart
- 2 Eddie Gerard&†
- 9-10-11 Grafton "Glenn" Smith&

Goaltenders

- 1 John Ross Roach
- 1 Ivan Mitchell (injured)&
- William Teale (Spare)@
- † borrowed for one game in the Stanley Cup Final from Ottawa
- &-missing from the team picture.
- ‡ Corb Denneny & Ken Randall each played one game as a Rover in the Stanley Cup Final
- @- included on the team picture, but never played in the NHL.

=== Coaching and administrative staff ===
- Charlie Querrie (President/Manager)
- George O'Donoghue (Business Manager/Coach)
- Willy Pop (Trainer)
- Harry McIlroy (Asst. Trainer)
- -Note-*(This was the last season that rover position was used in the Stanley Cup Final).

At the start of the 1922-23 season, PCHA and WCHL agreed to have an interlocking regular season schedule, and PCHA dropped the Rover position. The alternating games in the finals with or without the rover position was not necessary anymore. All Stanley Cup playoff games since have been played with 6 players on each side.

=== Stanley Cup engraving ===
For reasons unknown, the St. Pats did not engrave their name on the Cup for their 1922 championship. It was not until the trophy was redesigned in 1948 that the words "1922 Toronto St. Pats" was put onto its then-new collar in 1948. George O'Donoghue was 2nd NHL rookie coach to win the Stanley Cup

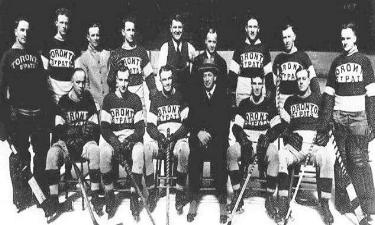

== See also ==
- 1921–22 NHL season
- 1921–22 PCHA season
- 1921-22 WCHL season

Preceded by Ottawa Senators; 1921	Toronto St. Patricks; Stanley Cup champions 1922	Succeeded by Ottawa Senators; 1923
