= Ted Stackhouse =

Canadian ice hockey player

- Born: November 2, 1894 New Glasgow, Nova Scotia, Canada
- Died: November 24, 1975 (aged 81)
- Height: 6 ft 1 in (185 cm)
- Weight: 200 lb (91 kg; 14 st 4 lb)
- Position: Defence
- Shot: Right
- Played for: Toronto St. Pats
- Playing career: 1920–1928

Theodore Keirstead Stackhouse (November 2, 1894 — November 24, 1975) was a Canadian ice hockey defenceman who played one season in the NHL for the Toronto St. Pats.

== NHL season ==
Stackhouse played only 13 games in the NHL, all during the 1921–22 season. With Toronto he won the Stanley Cup, helping them defeat the Vancouver Millionaires of the Pacific Coast Hockey Association in the Final.

== Career statistics ==
=== Regular season and playoffs ===
			Regular season					Playoffs
Season	Team	League	GP	G	A	Pts	PIM	GP	G	A	Pts	PIM
1913–14	Wolfville YMCA	WNSHL	—	—	—	—	—	—	—	—	—	—
1913–14	Acadia University	WNSHL	—	—	—	—	—	—	—	—	—	—
1914–15	Wolfville YMCA	WNSHL	—	—	—	—	—	—	—	—	—	—
1914–15	Acadia University	WNSHL	—	—	—	—	—	—	—	—	—	—
1916–17	New Glasgow Tigers	NSEHL	—	—	—	—	—	—	—	—	—	—
1917–18	New Glasgow Tigers	Exhib	—	—	—	—	—	—	—	—	—	—
1918–19	New Glasgow Tigers	Exhib	—	—	—	—	—	—	—	—	—	—
1919–20	Acadia University	WNSHL	—	—	—	—	—	—	—	—	—	—
1920–21	Wolfville AAA	NSVHL	1	0	1	1	0	—	—	—	—	—
1921–22	Toronto St. Pats	NHL	13	0	0	0	2	1	0	0	0	0
1921–22	Toronto St. Pats	St-Cup	—	—	—	—	—	4	0	0	0	0
1922–23	Amherst Ramblers	MIL	1	0	0	0	0	—	—	—	—	—
1922–23	Sydney Millionaires	Exhib	2	0	2	2	2	—	—	—	—	—
1925–26	Manchester New England	NEHL	—	—	—	—	—	—	—	—	—	—
1926–27	Nashua Nationals	NEHL	26	9	3	12	9	4	1	1	2	2
1926–27	Providence Reds	Can-Am	5	0	0	0	2	—	—	—	—	—
1927–28	Nashua Nationals	NEHL	20	4	3	7	10	4	1	1	2	2
NHL totals			13	0	0	0	2	1	0	0	0
