= Babe Dye =

Canadian ice hockey player (1898–1962)

- Hockey Hall of Fame, 1970
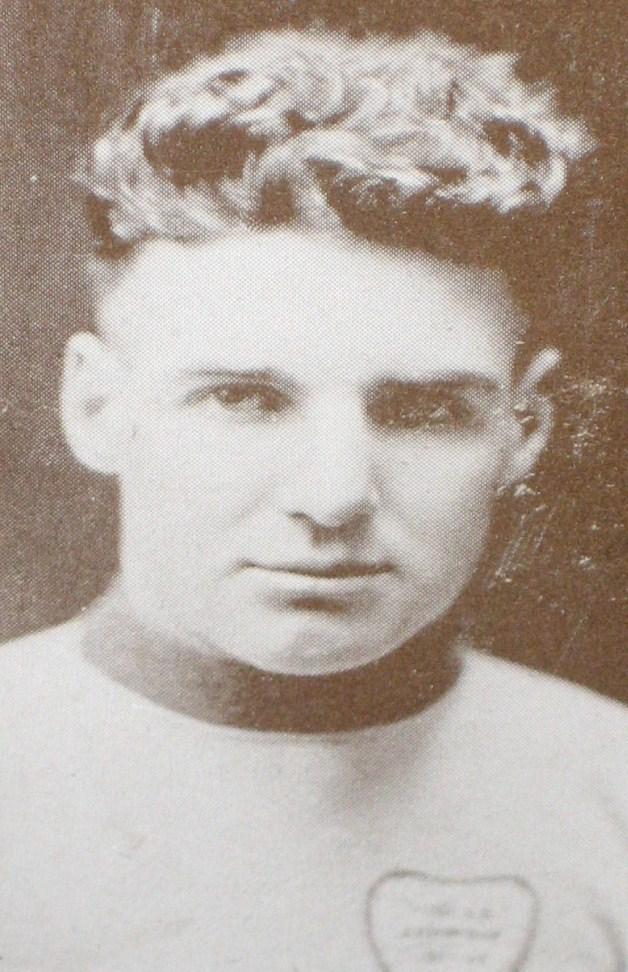
- Born: May 13, 1898 Hamilton, Ontario, Canada
- Died: January 3, 1962 (aged 63) Chicago, Illinois, U.S.
- Height: 5 ft 8 in (173 cm)
- Weight: 150 lb (68 kg; 10 st 10 lb)
- Position: Right wing
- Shot: Right
- Played for: Toronto St. Patricks; Hamilton Tigers; Chicago Black Hawks; New York Americans; Toronto Maple Leafs
- Playing career: 1919–1931

Cecil Henry "Babe" Dye (May 13, 1898 — January 3, 1962) was a Canadian professional ice hockey forward who played 11 seasons in the National Hockey League (NHL) for the Toronto St. Patricks/Maple Leafs, Hamilton Tigers, Chicago Black Hawks, and the New York Americans between 1919 and 1930. Born in Hamilton, Ontario, Dye was known as an excellent stick-handler and goal-scorer.

Dye began his professional ice hockey career with the Toronto St. Patricks in 1919. He became the NHL's point-scoring leader in the 1922–23 season, a feat he repeated during the 1924–25 season. In 1926, the St. Patricks sold Dye's contract to the Chicago Black Hawks. In 1927, Dye suffered a major leg injury during training camp, and did not return to play until the last 10 games of that season. Following that season, he was traded to the New York Americans. Dye's production dropped significantly as a result of his leg injury, and was reassigned to the Americans' minor league affiliate, the New Haven Eagles in 1929. The next year, Dye signed as a free agent with the first professional team he played for, since renamed the Maple Leafs. Dye played six games with the Maple Leafs before he retired from the sport.

He won his only Stanley Cup with the St. Patricks, in 1922. He was the NHL's top goal scorer of the 1920s, and remains the St. Patricks/Maple Leafs' all-time franchise points per game leader. Dye was posthumously inducted as a member of the Hockey Hall of Fame in 1970, eight years after his death.

In addition to playing professional ice hockey, he also played professional baseball with the Toronto Maple Leafs, Buffalo Bisons, and the Baltimore Orioles of the International League. He also holds four NHL records that remain unbroken over a century later. He also was a halfback for the Toronto Argonauts, a Canadian football team.

== Early life ==
Born in Hamilton, Ontario, Dye moved to Toronto when he was one year old, following the death of his father. Dye credited his goal-scoring abilities to his mother, who had built Dye an outdoor rink, as well as ensuring that he completed his skating and shooting drills. He played junior ice hockey from 1916 to 1918 for the Toronto Aura Lee and Toronto De La Salle of the Ontario Hockey Association. As a senior, he played for the amateur Toronto St. Patricks in 1918–19. He enlisted in the Canadian military on May 3, 1918, joining the 69th Battery of the Canadian Field Artillery; Dye trained at a base in Petawawa, Ontario but did not leave Canada during the war.

== Professional sports career ==
=== Ice hockey ===
Dye made his professional ice hockey debut in the 1919–20 season with the Toronto St. Patricks of the NHL. A slow skater, Dye was known for his hard and accurate shot. He played with the St. Patricks for eight seasons, leading the league in goals scored in the 1920–21, 1922–23, and 1924–25 seasons, leading the league in scoring in 1923 and 1925, and finishing second in goals scored in 1921–22 and 1923–24. When the Quebec Bulldogs moved to Hamilton in 1920 to become the Hamilton Tigers, Dye was loaned to the team for their first game; a native of Hamilton and a former star in the amateur OHA, it was hoped he would boost the attendance, as he was familiar to spectators. He was recalled back to Toronto after one game with Hamilton, as the team needed him to replace the injured Corb Denneny.

He led the St. Patricks to Stanley Cup championship in 1922, scoring nine goals in the five-game final series. Dye scored four goals in the series-clinching fifth game of the Finals, becoming only the second NHL player to record a hat trick in a Cup-clinching game; his hat-trick feat would not be replicated again for 101 years, and his four goals in a cup-clincher would not be matched for 103. In 1926, Dye was also inadvertently responsible for Conn Smythe's dismissal from the New York Rangers, after Smythe disagreed with the Rangers' owner, John S. Hammond, about acquiring Dye. By the end of the 1925-26 season, the toll of playing two professional sports was becoming apparent to St. Patricks' management. Because of the club's suspicions that playing two professional sports would take a toll on Dye's body, as well as their own financial struggles, in 1926, the club announced that Dye's contract would be up for bid.

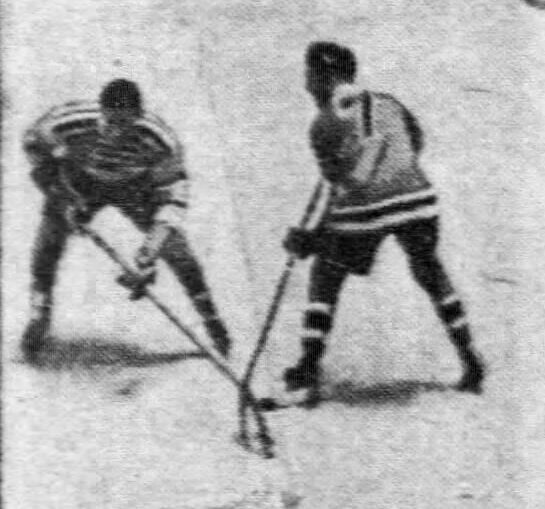
Frank Boucher of the New York Rangers takes the puck from Dye (playing for the Chicago Black Hawks) in a November 30, 1926, NHL game

Before the 1926–27 season, the Toronto St. Patricks sold Dye to the Chicago Black Hawks, a new NHL franchise. Dye had an outstanding season in Chicago, again leading the league in goals scored on the NHL's highest-scoring team, playing on a line with fellow Hamilton-born player Dick Irvin, who led the league in assists. Unfortunately, both players would soon suffer serious injuries that curtailed their playing careers. At training camp before the next season, Dye's leg was broken and he was never the same player again. He went scoreless for the Black Hawks in 10 games in the 1927–28 season and was then sold to the New York Americans. Over 42 games in 1928–29, Dye had just one goal for the Americans. In November 1929, he was traded to the minor league New Haven Eagles of the Canadian–American Hockey League.

In February 1930, he was signed as a free agent by his former team in Toronto, which had been renamed the Maple Leafs. Dye played six games with the club in the 1930–31 season before being released. Over his final 58 games in the NHL after his injury in 1927, Dye had scored just one goal. His 38 goals in the 30-game 1924–25 season set a St. Patricks/Maple Leafs franchise record that stood for 35 years until broken by Frank Mahovlich in the 70-game 1960–61 season. Over his first six seasons in the NHL, Dye scored 176 goals in 170 games.

=== Baseball ===
Dye was also a professional baseball player, beginning his career with the Toronto Maple Leafs of the International League in 1920. He was sent to Brantford of the Class B Michigan-Ontario League, popularly known as the Mint League. The Boston Red Sox held an option on Dye but chose not to exercise it.

In September 1921, the Brantford baseball club announced that it had sold Dye to the Buffalo Bisons of the IL for the highest price ever paid for a Brantford player. He had a strong season with the Bisons in 1923, and was then considered a top prospect for the major leagues. In September 1923, Dye announced that he was retiring from ice hockey to focus on baseball, but when the season started he re-signed with the St. Patricks. After the season, he re-joined the Bisons for training camp in March 1924. "Dye is surely a nifty baseball player, a good hitter, reliable outfielder, and speedy on the base paths," reported The Sporting News in August 1924. Dye again played for the Bisons in 1925 and was sold to the baseball Leafs after the end of the season. He was released by Toronto in July 1926 and signed by the Baltimore Orioles of the International League, where he finished his baseball career that year.

== Playing style ==
"I can't recall a player in my time, or since, who could control a shot like Babe. He could thread a needle with the puck and it came up like a bomb. Only Charlie Conacher fired as hard but he couldn't pick a corner the same. Geoffrion's slap shot probably travels as fast but the slap was unknown until Bunny Cook of the New York Rangers started fooling around with it."

— Hooley Smith on Dye's accuracy and clout

While not known as a fast skater, Dye was an excellent stickhandler and possessed one of the hardest and most accurate wrist shots in hockey during his tenure with the league. Almost unique among his contemporaries with the exception of Gordie Roberts and Harry Cameron, he was capable of great precision from long distances, while maintaining unrivaled velocity. Dye scored 12 of his 31 goals from behind the red line, during his third season with Toronto.

Dye's release was so quick that, on occasion, his goals would be in dispute because neither the linesmen, referee or goaltender had seen them enter the net. A notable instance of this occurred during the 1922 Final versus the Vancouver Millionaires. Toronto centreman Reg Noble won a faceoff in the Vancouver end, passing the puck back to Dye. The right winger immediately whipped the puck past Hugh "Old Eagle Eyes" Lehman, who had stood stock still without noticing the rubber entering his net. Players from both teams and the on-ice officials took several seconds to find the puck before the game could resume. It was one of 9 goals he would score during the winning series, and this remains a Stanley Cup record since the playoff format was implemented in 1914; Frank McGee's 15 goals in two games remains the all-time Stanley Cup single-series goal-scoring record.

Although weighing 150 pounds, Dye had immensely strong arms and used a stick made of solid hickory. While ice hockey sticks at the time were commonly made from maple, yellow birch, ironwood, ash or hickory, the latter is by far the strongest and most flexible. It is also far harder than the others, without being exceptionally brittle like ironwood, which is twice as hard as hickory. Dye used this stick and his wrist strength to propel the puck at occasionally dangerous speeds, and his "wicked drives" and shots that goalies "could not see" were mentioned many times in game summaries. His shots were capable of snapping a two-inch thick plank, and Jack Adams recalled seeing several of Dye's drives punch clean through the back-rests of arena seats and even through the 1/8-inch thick wire mesh used as crowd protection at Toronto's Arena Gardens. Opposing defencemen would attempt to knock down long shots made by Dye from centre ice, only to find out in dismay that their sticks had been shattered in two.

Sprague Cleghorn claimed that Babe Dye was the best shot of anyone he'd ever seen, and Adams rated him as superior in ability to Bryan Hextall, Grindy Forrester, Didier Pitre, Carson "Shovel-Shot" Cooper and even Charlie Conacher: "Dye was the peer of them all".

== Other achievements ==
Following his retirement as a player, Dye coached the Port Colborne Sailors to the Ontario Sr A Finals, and the following season he became head coach of the Chicago Shamrocks of the American Hockey Association in 1931–32, winning the league title. Despite the team's success, Dye was fired just before the championship-winning game because he hadn't prevented the team captain from going to Toronto to get married between games of the championship series. Dye said the player was determined to go and there was nothing he could do about it. The Shamrocks ended up folding before the next season began.

After ice hockey, Dye worked for Seneca Petroleum in Chicago for 20 years. He died at the age of 63 in Chicago, where he had been hospitalized for several months following a heart attack. He was inducted into the Hockey Hall of Fame in 1970. In 1997, he was ranked number 83 on The Hockey News' list of the 100 Greatest Hockey Players.

== Career statistics ==
=== Regular season and playoffs ===
| | | | Regular season | | | | | Playoffs |
| Season | Team | League | GP | G | A | Pts | PIM | GP | G | A | Pts | PIM |
|---|---|---|---|---|---|---|---|---|---|---|---|---|
| 1916–17 | Toronto Aura Lee | OHA | 8 | 31 | 0 | 31 | — | — | — | — | — | — |
| 1917–18 | Toronto De La Salle | OHA | — | — | — | — | — | — | — | — | — | — |
| 1918–19 | Toronto St. Patricks | OHA | 9 | 13 | 1 | 14 | — | 2 | 3 | 0 | 3 | 0 |
| 1919–20 | Toronto St. Patricks | NHL | 23 | 11 | 2 | 13 | 10 | — | — | — | — | — |
| 1920–21 | Hamilton Tigers | NHL | 1 | 2 | 0 | 2 | 0 | — | — | — | — | — |
| 1920–21 | Toronto St. Patricks | NHL | 23 | 33 | 5 | 38 | 32 | 2 | 0 | 0 | 0 | 7 |
| 1921–22 | Toronto St. Patricks | NHL | 24 | 31 | 7 | 38 | 39 | 2 | 2 | 0 | 2 | 2 |
| 1921–22 | Toronto St. Patricks | St-Cup | — | — | — | — | — | 5 | 9 | 1 | 10 | 2 |
| 1922–23 | Toronto St. Patricks | NHL | 22 | 27 | 12 | 39 | 21 | — | — | — | — | — |
| 1923–24 | Toronto St. Patricks | NHL | 19 | 17 | 4 | 21 | 23 | — | — | — | — | — |
| 1924–25 | Toronto St. Patricks | NHL | 29 | 38 | 8 | 46 | 38 | 2 | 0 | 0 | 0 | 0 |
| 1925–26 | Toronto St. Patricks | NHL | 31 | 18 | 6 | 24 | 26 | — | — | — | — | — |
| 1926–27 | Chicago Black Hawks | NHL | 41 | 25 | 5 | 30 | 14 | 2 | 0 | 0 | 0 | 2 |
| 1927–28 | Chicago Black Hawks | NHL | 11 | 0 | 0 | 0 | 0 | — | — | — | — | — |
| 1928–29 | New York Americans | NHL | 42 | 1 | 0 | 1 | 17 | 2 | 0 | 0 | 0 | 0 |
| 1929–30 | New Haven Eagles | Can-Am | 34 | 11 | 4 | 15 | 16 | — | — | — | — | — |
| 1930–31 | Toronto Maple Leafs | NHL | 6 | 0 | 0 | 0 | 0 | — | — | — | — | — |
| NHL totals | | | 272 | 203 | 49 | 252 | 220 | 10 | 2 | 0 | 2 | 11 |

== NHL Records ==
| Record | Event | # | Notes | Ref. |
|---|---|---|---|---|
| Most goals when facing elimination, playoff year | 1921–22 season | 6 | Tied with three other players: Courtnall, Cammalleri, Williams | |
| Most goals when facing elimination, playoff series | 1922 Stanley Cup Final | 6 | | |
| Most goals, Stanley Cup Final series | 1922 Stanley Cup Final | 9 | Tied with two other players: Cyclone Taylor, Frank Foyston | |
| Most goals, Stanley Cup Final game | March 28, 1922 | 4 | Tied with five other players: Lalonde, Foyston, Lindsay, Richard, Reinhart | |

== See also ==
- List of players with five or more goals in an NHL game

| Preceded by Punch Broadbent; Cy Denneny | NHL point-scoring leader 1923; 1925 | Succeeded by Cy Denneny; Nels Stewart |
| Preceded by Joe Malone; Cy Denneny | NHL goal-scoring leader 1921, 1922, 1923; 1925 | Succeeded by Cy Denneny; Nels Stewart |
