= 1921–22 Hamilton Tigers season =

National Hockey League team season

1921–22 Hamilton Tigers
- League: 4th NHL
- 1921–22 record: 7–17–0
- Home record: 5–7–0
- Road record: 2–10–0
- Goals for: 88
- Goals against: 105

Team information
- General manager: Percy Thompson
- Coach: Joe Malone
- Arena: Barton Street Arena

Team leaders
- Goals: Joe Malone (24)
- Assists: Leo Reise (14)
- Points: Joe Malone (31)
- Penalty minutes: Harry Mummery (40)
- Wins: Howard Lockhart (6)
- Goals against average: Howard Lockhart (4.39)

The 1921–22 Hamilton Tigers season was the second season of the NHL franchise in Hamilton. The team finished last in the NHL standings for the second consecutive year.

== Offseason ==
Prior to the start of the season the team adopted new uniforms. During their inaugural season the Tigers used a uniform of vertical stripes with a logo of a tiger head; for 1921–22 a full-body image of a tiger was used, over top of horizontal stripes.

== Regular season ==
=== Final standings ===
National Hockey League
	GP	W	L	T	Pts	GF	GA
**Ottawa Senators**	24	14	8	2	30	106	84
**Toronto St. Patricks**	24	13	10	1	27	98	97
Montreal Canadiens	24	12	11	1	25	88	94
Hamilton Tigers	24	7	17	0	14	88	105

Note: GP = Games played, W = Wins, L = Losses, T = Ties, Pts = Points, GF = Goals for, GA = Goals against
Teams that qualified for the playoffs are highlighted in bold.

=== Record vs. opponents ===
1921–22 NHL Records
Team	HAM	MTL	OTT	TOR
Hamilton	—	1–7	3–5	3–5
Montreal	7–1	—	1–6–1	4–4
Ottawa	5–3	6–1–1	—	3–4–1
Toronto	5–3	4–4	4–3–1	—

== Schedule and results ==
1921–22 regular season
December

Game	Result	Date	Score	Opponent	Record
1	L	December 17, 1921	2–3 OT	Ottawa Senators (1921–22)	0–1–0
2	L	December 21, 1921	1–3	@ Montreal Canadiens (1921–22)	0–2–0
3	W	December 24, 1921	4–2	@ Toronto St. Patricks (1921–22)	1–2–0
4	L	December 28, 1921	3–4	Toronto St. Patricks (1921–22)	1–3–0
5	L	December 31, 1921	0–4	@ Ottawa Senators (1921–22)	1–4–0

January

Game	Result	Date	Score	Opponent	Record
6	W	January 4, 1922	4–3	Montreal Canadiens (1921–22)	2–4–0
7	L	January 7, 1922	2–5	@ Toronto St. Patricks (1921–22)	2–5–0
8	L	January 11, 1922	2–3	Montreal Canadiens (1921–22)	2–6–0
9	L	January 14, 1922	6–10	@ Montreal Canadiens (1921–22)	2–7–0
10	W	January 18, 1922	9–4	Toronto St. Patricks (1921–22)	3–7–0
11	W	January 21, 1922	7–6 OT	Ottawa Senators (1921–22)	4–7–0
12	L	January 25, 1922	2–4	@ Ottawa Senators (1921–22)	4–8–0
13	L	January 28, 1922	2–3	@ Montreal Canadiens (1921–22)	4–9–0

February

Game	Result	Date	Score	Opponent	Record
14	L	February 1, 1922	4–5	Toronto St. Patricks (1921–22)	4–10–0
15	L	February 4, 1922	6–10	@ Ottawa Senators (1921–22)	4–11–0
16	W	February 8, 1922	9–1	Ottawa Senators (1921–22)	5–11–0
17	L	February 11, 1922	1–3	Montreal Canadiens (1921–22)	5–12–0
18	L	February 15, 1922	4–6	@ Toronto St. Patricks (1921–22)	5–13–0
19	L	February 18, 1922	2–4	Ottawa Senators (1921–22)	5–14–0
20	W	February 22, 1922	4–3	Toronto St. Patricks (1921–22)	6–14–0
21	L	February 25, 1922	1–6	@ Montreal Canadiens (1921–22)	6–15–0

March

Game	Result	Date	Score	Opponent	Record
22	L	March 1, 1922	2–3	Montreal Canadiens (1921–22)	6–16–0
23	L	March 4, 1922	4–8	@ Toronto St. Patricks (1921–22)	6–17–0
24	W	March 8, 1922	7–2	@ Ottawa Senators (1921–22)	7–17–0

**Legend**: Win (2 points) Loss (0 points) Tie (1 point)

== Player statistics ==
Regular season
**Scoring**

Player	Pos	GP	G	A	Pts	PIM
Joe Malone	C/LW	24	24	7	31	4
Leo Reise	D	24	9	14	23	8
Goldie Prodgers	F/D	24	15	6	21	4
Mickey Roach	C	24	14	6	20	7
Cully Wilson	RW	23	7	9	16	20
Amos Arbour	LW	23	9	6	15	8
Harry Mummery	D	20	4	2	6	40
Joe Matte	D	21	3	3	6	6
George Carey	RW	23	3	2	5	6
Howard Lockhart	G	24	0	0	0	0

**Goaltending**

Player	MIN	GP	W	L	T	GA	GAA	SO
Howard Lockhart	1409	24	6	17	0	103	4.39	0
Harry Mummery	50	1	1	0	0	2	2.40	0
Team:	1459	24	7	17	0	105	4.32	0

Note: Pos = Position; GP = Games played; G = Goals; A = Assists; Pts = Points; PIM = Penalty minutes
MIN = Minutes played; W = Wins; L = Losses; T = Ties; GA = Goals-against; GAA = Goals-against average; SO = Shutouts;

== See also ==
- 1921–22 NHL season
