= Paddy Nolan (ice hockey) =

Canadian ice hockey player

- Born: December 1, 1897 Glace Bay, Nova Scotia, Canada
- Died: April 12, 1957 (aged 59) New Glasgow, Nova Scotia, Canada
- Height: 5 ft 8 in (173 cm)
- Weight: 170 lb (77 kg; 12 st 2 lb)
- Position: Left wing
- Shot: Left
- Played for: Toronto St. Patricks
- Playing career: 1915–1931

James Patrick Nolan (December 1, 1897 – April 12, 1957) was a Canadian ice hockey player who played one season in the National Hockey League for the Toronto St. Patricks in 1922. Nolan was born in Glace Bay, Nova Scotia and he appeared in only two games during the 1921–22 season, on January 7, 1922 against the Hamilton Tigers, and January 14 against the Ottawa Senators. The rest of Nolan's career, which lasted from 1915 to 1931, was spent in various minor and amateur leagues.

== Career statistics ==
=== Regular season and playoffs ===
			Regular season					Playoffs
Season	Team	League	GP	G	A	Pts	PIM	GP	G	A	Pts	PIM
1915–16	Glace Bay Miners	CBHL	8	16	4	20	—	4	9	0	9	—
1916–17	Glace Bay Miners	CBHL	1	1	1	2	—	1	3	0	3	—
1916–17	New Glasgow Black Foxes	CBHL	2	2	0	2	12	—	—	—	—	—
1917–18	Glace Bay Miners	CBHL	8	10	2	12	5	6	4	2	6	2
1918–19	Glace Bay Miners	CBHL	—	—	—	—	—	—	—	—	—	—
1919–20	New Glasgow Black Foxes	NSPHL	6	6	0	6	—	—	—	—	—	—
1920–21	Stellarton Seniors	Exhib	4	7	3	10	—	2	0	1	1	3
1921–22	Toronto St. Pats	NHL	2	0	0	0	0	—	—	—	—	—
1921–22	New Glasgow Black Foxes	NSSHL	6	4	0	4	12	7	4	0	4	—
1922–23	Stellerton Professionals	MIL	12	15	0	15	30	3	6	0	6	5
1923–24	Stellerton Professionals	MIL	16	10	0	10	23	—	—	—	—	—
1924–25	New Glasgow Colts	Exhib	2	6	0	6	0	—	—	—	—	—
1924–25	Stellerton Pros	Exhib	—	—	—	—	—	2	2	0	2	0
1926–27	New Glasgow Cubs	NSAPC	—	—	—	—	—	—	—	—	—	—
1928–29	New Glasgow Chevrolets	NSAPC	—	5	5	10	—	—	—	—	—	—
1929–30	New Glasgow Colts	NSEHL	15	12	0	12	11	3	2	0	2	—
1930–31	New Glasgow High	High-NS	—	—	—	—	—	—	—	—	—	—
1930–31	New Glasgow Tigers	NSEHL	2	2	0	2	0	—	—	—	—	—
NHL totals			2	0	0	0	0	—	—	—	—	—
