= Phil Stevens (ice hockey) =

Canadian ice hockey player

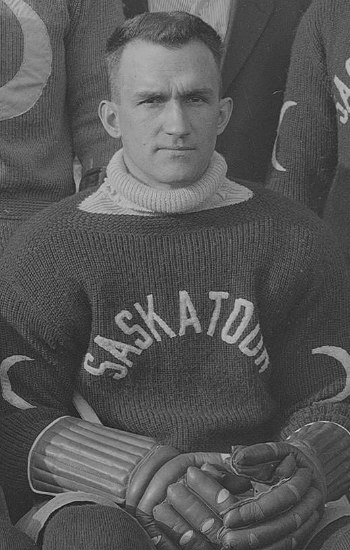
- Born: February 15, 1893 Saint-Lambert, Quebec, Canada
- Died: April 8, 1968 (aged 75) Kelowna, British Columbia, Canada
- Height: 5 ft 11 in (180 cm)
- Weight: 165 lb (75 kg; 11 st 11 lb)
- Position: Centre
- Shot: Right
- Played for: Montreal Wanderers; Montreal Canadiens; Saskatoon Crescents; Boston Bruins; Springfield Indians; Saskatoon Sheiks; Oakland Sheiks
- Playing career: 1911–1932

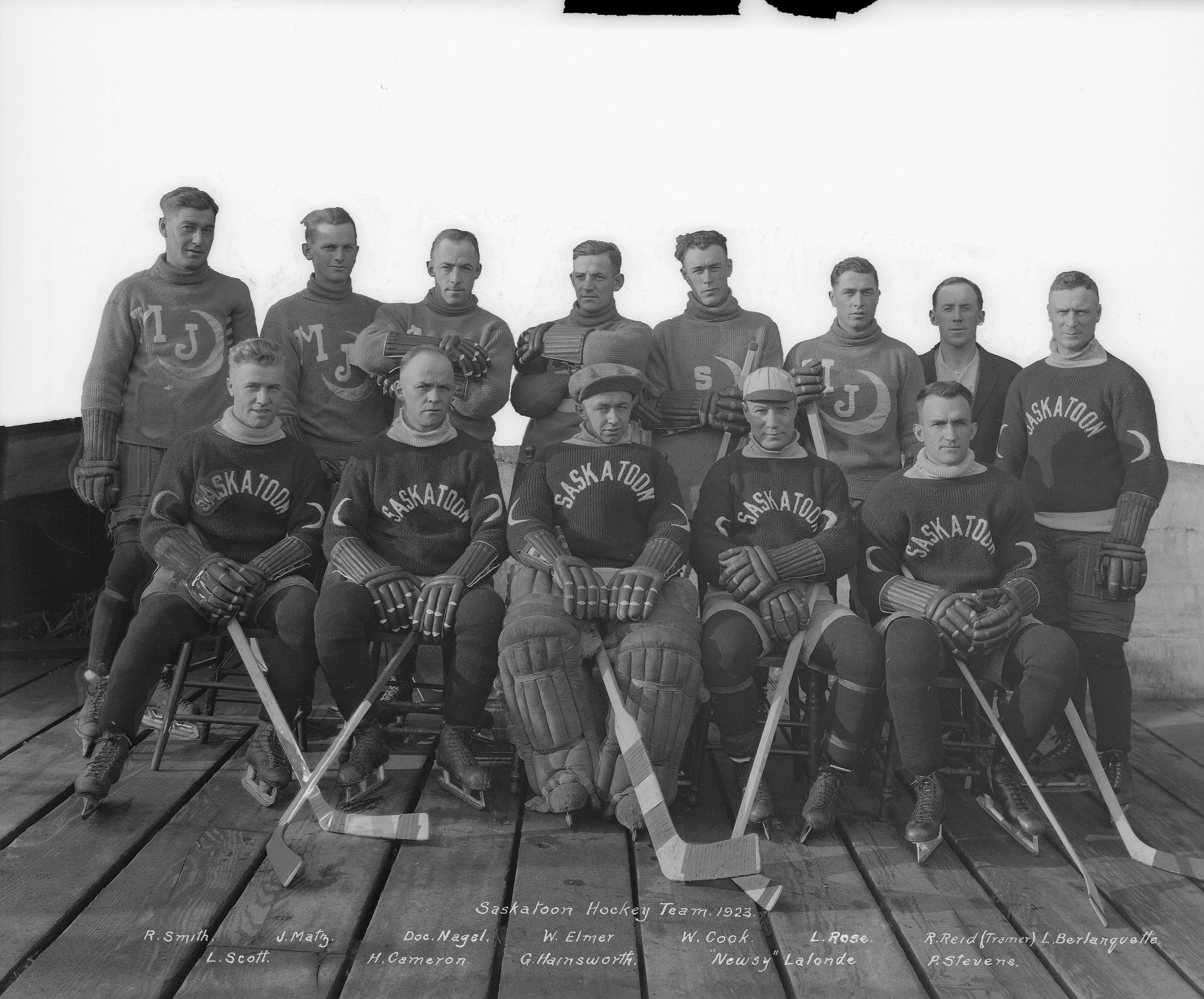
Stevens, sitting far right, with the Saskatoon Sheiks/Crescents in 1923–24.

Philip Collins Stevens (February 15, 1893 – April 8, 1968) was a Canadian professional ice hockey centre who played hockey from 1911 until 1932.

== Biography ==
Starting as an amateur, he turned professional in 1914 when he joined the Montreal Wanderers of the National Hockey Association (NHA), playing three seasons in the NHA and following the Wanderers to the National Hockey League (NHL), where he played four games before the team folded. He returned to the NHL for one season in 1921 with the Montreal Canadiens before moving to the Saskatoon Sheiks of the Western Canada Hockey League for three seasons. He played his final NHL season in 1925–26 with the Boston Bruins, and finished his career with stints in the minor Canadian–American Hockey League, Prairie Hockey League, and California Hockey League before retiring.

== Career statistics ==
=== Regular season and playoffs ===
			Regular season					Playoffs
Season	Team	League	GP	G	A	Pts	PIM	GP	G	A	Pts	PIM
1911–12	Montreal AAA	IPAHU	5	3	0	3	15	—	—	—	—	—
1911–12	Montreal St-Jacques	MCHL	—	—	—	—	—	—	—	—	—	—
1912–13	Grand-Mère HC	IPAHU	5	0	0	0	12	—	—	—	—	—
1912–13	Grand-Mère HC	Al-Cup	—	—	—	—	—	2	0	0	0	0
1913–14	Grand-Mère HC	IPAHU	—	—	—	—	—	—	—	—	—	—
1914–15	Montreal Wanderers	NHA	15	0	1	1	6	2	0	0	0	—
1915–16	Montreal Wanderers	NHA	22	2	2	4	33	—	—	—	—	—
1916–17	Montreal Wanderers	NHA	15	4	2	6	38	—	—	—	—	—
1917–18	Montreal Wanderers	NHL	4	1	0	1	3	—	—	—	—	—
1921–22	Montreal Canadiens	NHL	4	0	0	0	0	—	—	—	—	—
1962–63	Saskatoon Sheiks	WCHL	15	0	0	0	3	—	—	—	—	—
1923–24	Saskatoon Crescents	WCHL	26	6	2	8	14	—	—	—	—	—
1924–25	Saskatoon Crescents	WCHL	25	2	0	2	30	2	0	0	0	0
1925–26	Boston Bruins	NHL	17	0	0	0	0	—	—	—	—	—
1926–27	Springfield Indians	CAHL	6	0	1	1	0	—	—	—	—	—
1926–27	Saskatoon Sheiks	PrHL	23	8	2	10	11	4	1	1	2	6
1927–28	Saskatoon Sheiks	PrHL	28	3	1	4	8	—	—	—	—	—
1928–29	Oakland Sheiks	Cal-Pro	—	6	2	8	—	—	—	—	—	—
1929–30	Oakland Sheiks	Cal-Pro	—	—	—	—	—	—	—	—	—	—
1930–31	Oakland Sheiks	Cal-Pro	—	12	4	16	—	4	0	1	1	—
1931–32	Oakland Sheiks	Cal-Pro	—	1	0	1	—	—	—	—	—	—
NHA totals			52	6	5	11	77	2	0	0	0	—
NHL totals			25	1	0	1	3	—	—	—	—	—
