= Glenn Smith =

Canadian ice hockey player (1895–1949)

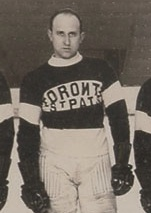
- Smith in the 1921–22 Toronto St. Pats photo
- Born: April 25, 1895; Meaford, Ontario, Canada
- Died: October 6, 1949 (aged 54); Toronto, Ontario, Canada
- Height: 5 ft 8 in (173 cm)
- Weight: 180 lb (82 kg; 12 st 12 lb)
- Position: Defence
- Shot: Left
- Played for: Toronto St. Pats
- Playing career: 1915–1922

Grafton Glenard Smith (April 25, 1895 – October 6, 1949) was a Canadian ice hockey player who played nine games in the National Hockey League during the 1921–22 season for the Toronto St. Pats, and won the Stanley Cup with the team. The rest of his career, which lasted from 1915 to 1922, was spent in the Ontario Hockey Association senior league. Born in Meaford, Ontario, Smith played junior hockey in Woodstock from 1910 to 1914, when he left to military service. After his return, he played senior hockey in Toronto until 1921. After his hockey career ended, he retired to the township of East York, in Ontario.

In 1949, Glenn Smith died suddenly at St. Michael's Hospital in Toronto. He was buried October 13, 1949 at Mount Hope Cemetery in Toronto. He had been an editor and publisher of a magazine in the final years of his life.

== Career statistics ==
=== Regular season and playoffs ===
			Regular season					Playoffs
Season	Team	League	GP	G	A	Pts	PIM	GP	G	A	Pts	PIM
1910–11	Woodstock Athletics	OHA Jr	6	4	0	4	—	—	—	—	—	—
1911–12	Woodstock Athletics	OHA Jr	—	—	—	—	—	—	—	—	—	—
1912–13	Woodstock Athletics	OHA Jr	—	—	—	—	—	—	—	—	—	—
1913–14	Woodstock Athletics	OHA Jr	—	—	—	—	—	—	—	—	—	—
1915–16	Toronto Riversides	OHA Sr	7	5	0	5	—	2	1	0	1	0
1915–16	Toronto Riversides	Al-Cup	—	—	—	—	—	4	4	0	4	0
1916–17	Toronto Riversides	OHA	8	4	0	4	—	2	0	0	0	4
1917–18	Toronto Crescents	OHA	9	10	0	10	—	—	—	—	—	—
1918–19	Toronto Dentals	OHA Sr	7	8	1	9	—	1	0	0	0	0
1920–21	Toronto St. Francis	OHA Sr	1	0	0	0	—	—	—	—	—	—
1921–22	Toronto St. Pats	NHL	9	0	0	0	0	—	—	—	—	—
OHA Sr totals			32	27	1	28	—	9	5	0	5	4
NHL totals			9	0	0	0	0	—	—	—	—	—
