= George O'Donoghue =

Canadian ice hockey coach

- Born: George Maurice O'Donoghue; December 8, 1885; Toronto, Ontario, Canada
- Died: December 5, 1925 (aged 39); Toronto, Ontario, Canada
- Occupation: Former ice hockey coach

George Maurice O'Donoghue (December 8, 1885 – December 5, 1925) was a Canadian ice hockey coach who served as the head coach of the Toronto St. Pats when they won the Stanley Cup championship in 1922. He is the coach with the least amount of career victories (15) to win the Cup. He died in 1925 of pneumonia at the age of 39.

== Coaching record ==
Team	Year	Regular Season							Post Season
Team	Year	G	W	L	T	OTL	Pts	Finish	Result
TOR	1921–22	24	13	10	1	—	27	2nd in NHL	Won NHL Championship (5-4 vs. OTT); Won Stanley Cup (3-2 vs. VAN)
TOR	1922–23	5	2	3	0	—	4	3rd in NHL	(fired)
Total		29	15	13	1	—	31		Won 1 Stanley Cup

== Awards and achievements ==
- 1922 Stanley Cup Championship (Toronto)

Preceded by Frank Carroll	Head coach of the Toronto St. Patricks; 1921-22	Succeeded by Charles Querrie
