= John Ross Roach =

Canadian ice hockey player

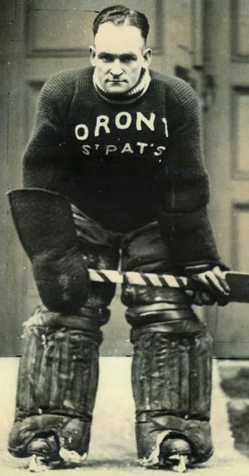
- Roach with the Toronto St. Patricks, c. 1922
- Born: June 23, 1900 Port Perry, Ontario, Canada
- Died: July 9, 1973 (aged 73) Windsor, Ontario, Canada
- Height: 5 ft 5 in (165 cm)
- Weight: 130 lb (59 kg; 9 st 4 lb)
- Position: Goaltender
- Caught: Left
- Played for: Toronto St. Patricks; Toronto Maple Leafs; New York Rangers; Detroit Red Wings
- Playing career: 1921–1935

John Ross Roach (June 23, 1900 – July 9, 1973) was a Canadian professional ice hockey goaltender who played in the National Hockey League (NHL) between 1921 and 1935. His nicknames were "Little Napoleon", "the Housecleaner", "the Port Perry Cucumber", and the "Port Perry Woodpecker."

== Playing career ==
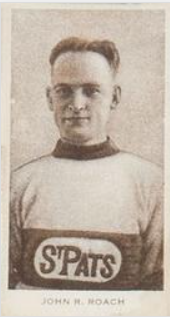
1924-25 card of Roach for Toronto St. Pats

Roach was born in Port Perry, Ontario. He won a Stanley Cup in 1922, which saw the Toronto St. Patricks defeat the Vancouver Millionaires in five games, with game four seeing a 6-0 shutout by Roach that made him the first rookie goaltender with a shutout in the Stanley Cup Final; for whatever reason, the St. Patricks did not engrave their name or their players onto the Cup.

Roach was one of only six goalies in the NHL to captain his team when he was with the Toronto St. Patricks during the 1924–25 season. He was a First Team All-Star during the 1932–33 NHL season, which saw him win 25 games to see him become the first ever goaltender to win 200 career games. Roach was known for his acrobatic style of goaltending. When his NHL career ended, he was fifth all-time with shutouts for a goaltender with 58 while having the most wins in his career span of 1921 to 1935 with 219 victories. His amount of victories in total were 2nd to only George Hainsworth in NHL history. He is one of just ten goaltenders with four seasons of having a Goals against average under 2.00.

In the 2009 book 100 Ranger Greats, the authors ranked Roach at No. 64 all-time of the 901 New York Rangers who had played during the team's first 82 seasons.

== Career statistics ==
=== Regular season and playoffs ===
			Regular season								Playoffs
Season	Team	League	GP	W	L	T	Min	GA	SO	GAA	GP	W	L	T	Min	GA	SO	GAA
1919–20	Toronto Aura Lee	OHA-Jr.	6	4	2	0	360	31	0	5.17	—	—	—	—	—	—	—	—
1920–21	Toronto Granites	OHA-Sr.	10	8	2	0	566	12	3	1.27	2	1	1	0	120	7	0	3.50
1921–22	Toronto St. Pats	NHL	22	11	10	1	1340	91	0	4.07	2	1	0	1	120	4	1	2.00
1921–22	Toronto St. Pats	St-Cup	—	—	—	—	—	—	—	—	5	3	2	—	305	9	1	1.77
1922–23	Toronto St. Pats	NHL	24	13	10	1	1469	88	1	3.59	—	—	—	—	—	—	—	—
1923–24	Toronto St. Pats	NHL	23	10	13	0	1380	80	1	3.48	—	—	—	—	—	—	—	—
1924–25	Toronto St. Pats	NHL	30	19	11	0	1800	84	1	2.80	2	0	2	0	120	5	0	2.50
1925–26	Toronto St. Pats	NHL	36	12	21	3	2231	114	2	3.07	—	—	—	—	—	—	—	—
1926–27	Toronto Maple Leafs	NHL	44	15	24	5	2764	94	4	2.04	—	—	—	—	—	—	—	—
1927–28	Toronto Maple Leafs	NHL	43	18	18	7	2690	88	4	1.96	—	—	—	—	—	—	—	—
1928–29	New York Rangers	NHL	44	21	13	10	2760	65	13	1.41	6	3	2	1	392	5	3	0.77
1929–30	New York Rangers	NHL	44	17	17	10	2770	143	1	3.10	4	1	2	1	309	7	0	1.36
1930–31	New York Rangers	NHL	44	19	16	9	2760	87	7	1.89	4	2	2	0	240	4	1	1.00
1931–32	New York Rangers	NHL	48	23	17	8	3020	112	9	2.23	7	3	4	0	480	27	1	3.38
1931–32	Cleveland Indians	IHL	1	1	0	0	60	1	0	1.00	—	—	—	—	—	—	—	—
1932–33	Detroit Red Wings	NHL	48	25	15	8	2970	93	10	1.88	4	2	2	0	240	8	1	2.00
1933–34	Detroit Red Wings	NHL	19	9	8	1	1030	45	1	2.62	—	—	—	—	—	—	—	—
1933–34	Syracuse Stars	IHL	13	—	—	—	780	36	2	2.77	9	4	4	1	560	15	1	1.61
1934–35	Detroit Red Wings	NHL	23	7	11	5	1460	62	4	2.55	—	—	—	—	—	—	—	—
1934–35	Detroit Olympics	IHL	9	4	4	1	560	15	1	1.61	—	—	—	—	—	—	—	—
NHL totals			492	219	204	68	30,444	1246	58	2.46	29	12	14	3	1901	60	7	1.89

Preceded by Reg Noble	Toronto St. Pats captain 1924–25	Succeeded by Bert Corbeau
