= Reg Noble =

Canadian ice hockey player (1896–1962)

- Hockey Hall of Fame, 1962
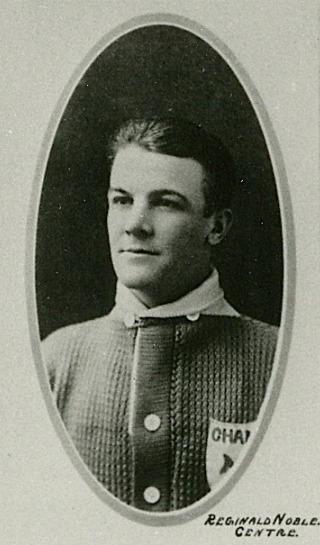
- Noble with the Toronto Arenas, c. 1917
- Born: June 23, 1896 Collingwood, Ontario, Canada
- Died: January 19, 1962 (aged 65) Alliston, Ontario, Canada
- Height: 5 ft 8 in (173 cm)
- Weight: 180 lb (82 kg; 12 st 12 lb)
- Position: Centre / Left wing
- Shot: Left
- Played for: Toronto Blueshirts; Montreal Canadiens; Toronto Arenas; Toronto St. Patricks; Montreal Maroons; Detroit Red Wings
- Playing career: 1916–1933

Edward Reginald Noble (June 23, 1896 – January 19, 1962) was a Canadian professional ice hockey forward and defenceman who played 17 professional seasons in the National Hockey Association (NHA) and National Hockey League (NHL) for the Toronto Blueshirts, Montreal Canadiens, Toronto St. Pats, Montreal Maroons, Detroit Cougars, Detroit Falcons and Detroit Red Wings between 1916 and 1933. He was a three-time winner of the Stanley Cup, with Toronto and Montreal and was inducted into the Hockey Hall of Fame in 1962. He was also the last active player from the NHL's inaugural season, the NHA and the 1910s.

== Playing career ==
Prior to turning professional Noble enlisted in February 1916 with the 180th Battalion (Sportsmen) to serve in the First World War. However he was medically discharged in September that year due to previous foot injury (a tendon in his right foot had previously been cut) which prevented him from marching for long periods, and did not go overseas.

Noble started his professional career with the Toronto Blueshirts during the 1916–17. The club was suspended by the league and he was assigned by the league to the Montreal Canadiens for the rest of the season. The following year, the new NHL assigned the Toronto franchise to the Toronto Arena owners and Noble signed with the team. The Blueshirts, despite the ownership difficulty and several personnel changes, won the NHL title and defeated Vancouver for the Stanley Cup championship. Noble would stay with the franchise as it became the Arenas, and later the St. Pats, until he was traded to the Montreal Maroons in the 1924–25 season. The St. Pats would win the Stanley Cup again in 1922, a season where Noble was playing coach and captain. One season after joining the Maroons, the Maroons themselves would win the Stanley Cup in 1926. In 1927, he was traded to the new Detroit franchise in the NHL, then named the Falcons. He would play for the franchise for six seasons, eventually returning by trade to the Maroons in 1932–33. He retired with 181 goals in 536 games in the NHA and NHL.

After retiring Noble worked as a referee in the NHL between 1937 and 1939. He died of a heart attack January 19, 1962. He was inducted posthumously into the Hall of Fame in 1962.

== Career statistics ==
=== Regular season and playoffs ===
			Regular season					Playoffs
Season	Team	League	GP	G	A	Pts	PIM	GP	G	A	Pts	PIM
1915–16	St. Michael's College School	OHA	—	—	—	—	—	6	9	0	9	—
1915–16	Toronto Riversides	OHA Sr	10	14	0	14	—	4	6	0	6	—
1916–17	Toronto Blueshirts	NHA	14	7	5	12	41	—	—	—	—	—
1916–17	Montreal Canadiens	NHA	6	4	0	4	15	2	0	1	1	2
1916–17	Montreal Canadiens	St-Cup	—	—	—	—	—	—	—	—	—	—
1917–18	Toronto Arenas	NHL	20	30	10	40	35	2	1	1	2	9
1917–18	Toronto Arenas	St-Cup	—	—	—	—	—	5	2	1	3	12
1918–19	Toronto Arenas	NHL	17	10	5	15	35	—	—	—	—	—
1919–20	Toronto St. Patricks	NHL	24	24	9	33	52	—	—	—	—	—
1920–21	Toronto St. Patricks	NHL	24	19	8	27	54	2	0	0	0	0
1921–22	Toronto St. Patricks	NHL	24	17	11	28	19	2	0	0	0	12
1921–22	Toronto St. Patricks	St-Cup	—	—	—	—	—	5	0	1	1	9
1922–23	Toronto St. Patricks	NHL	24	12	11	23	47	—	—	—	—	—
1923–24	Toronto St. Patricks	NHL	24	12	5	17	79	—	—	—	—	—
1924–25	Toronto St. Patricks	NHL	3	1	0	1	8	—	—	—	—	—
1924–25	Montreal Maroons	NHL	27	8	11	19	56	—	—	—	—	—
1925–26	Montreal Maroons	NHL	33	9	9	18	96	4	1	1	2	6
1925–26	Montreal Maroons	St-Cup	—	—	—	—	—	4	0	0	0	4
1926–27	Montreal Maroons	NHL	43	3	3	6	112	2	0	0	0	2
1927–28	Detroit Cougars	NHL	44	6	8	14	63	—	—	—	—	—
1928–29	Detroit Cougars	NHL	43	6	4	10	52	2	0	0	0	2
1929–30	Detroit Cougars	NHL	43	6	4	10	72	—	—	—	—	—
1930–31	Detroit Falcons	NHL	44	2	5	7	42	—	—	—	—	—
1931–32	Detroit Falcons	NHL	48	3	3	6	72	2	0	0	0	0
1932–33	Detroit Red Wings	NHL	5	0	0	0	6	—	—	—	—	—
1932–33	Montreal Maroons	NHL	20	0	0	0	16	2	0	0	0	2
1933–34	Cleveland Falcons	IHL	40	2	3	5	43	—	—	—	—	—
St-Cup totals			—	—	—	—	—	14	2	2	4	25
NHL totals			510	168	106	274	916	18	2	2	4	33

== Awards and achievements ==
- 1914–15 – OHA-Jr. First All-Star Team
- 1918 – Stanley Cup championship (Toronto Arenas)
- 1922 – Stanley Cup championship (Toronto St. Pats)
- 1926 – Stanley Cup championship (Montreal Maroons)
- 1962 – Inducted into the Hockey Hall of Fame

== Transactions ==
- November 25, 1916 – signed as a free agent by Toronto (NHA)
- February 11, 1917 – assigned to Montreal Canadiens (NHA) by NHA in dispersal of Toronto (NHA) players
- December 5, 1917 – signed as a free agent by Toronto (NHL)
- November 1, 1921 – named player coach of Toronto (NHL).
- November 1, 1922 – resigned as coach and captain of Toronto (NHL)
- December 9, 1924 – traded to Montreal Maroons by Toronto for $8,000.
- October 4, 1927 – traded to Detroit by Montreal Maroons for $7,500.
- December 9, 1932 – traded to Montreal Maroons by Detroit for John Gallagher.

Source: "NHL.com - Players: Reg Noble".

== Bibliography ==
- MacLeod, Alan Livingstone (2018), From Rinks to Regiments: Hockey Hall-of-Famers and the Great War, Victoria, British Columbia: Heritage House, ISBN 978-1-77203-268-0

Preceded by Toronto Arenas captains Ken Randall	Toronto St. Pats captain 1920–24	Succeeded by John Ross Roach
Preceded by Art Duncan	Detroit Cougars captain 1927–30	Succeeded by Detroit Falcons captains George Hay
