= Corbett Denneny =

Canadian ice hockey player (1894–1963)

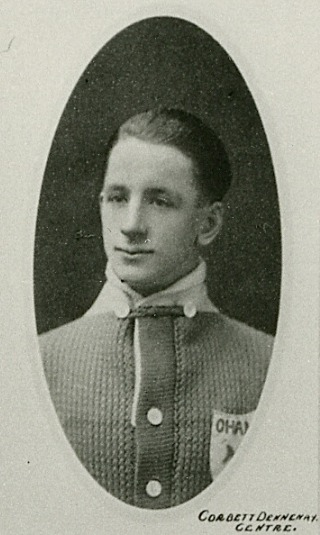
- Denneny with the Toronto Arenas
- Born: January 25, 1894 Cornwall, Ontario, Canada
- Died: January 16, 1963 (aged 68) Toronto, Ontario, Canada
- Height: 5 ft 8 in (173 cm)
- Weight: 160 lb (73 kg; 11 st 6 lb)
- Position: Centre
- Shot: Right
- Played for: Cobalt McKinley Mines; Toronto Ontarios; Toronto Blueshirts; Toronto Arenas; Toronto St. Pats; Vancouver Maroons; Hamilton Tigers; Saskatoon Crescents; Toronto Maple Leafs; Saskatoon Sheiks; Chicago Black Hawks; Minneapolis Millers; Newark Bulldogs; Chicago Shamrocks
- Playing career: 1912–1931

Charles Corbett "Corb" Denneny (January 25, 1894 – January 16, 1963) was a Canadian professional ice hockey forward who played professionally from 1912 to 1931, including nine seasons in the National Hockey League (NHL) for the Toronto Arenas, Toronto St. Pats, Hamilton Tigers and Chicago Black Hawks. Corbett also played for the Vancouver Maroons of the Pacific Coast Hockey Association (PCHA) and the Saskatoon Sheiks of Western Canada Hockey League (WCHL, then WHL). He twice won the Stanley Cup (1918, 1922) with the original versions of the NHL's Toronto franchise. In the first Stanley Cup Final contested by an NHL team in 1918, he scored the game-winning goal in Game 5 to help defeat the Vancouver Millionaires.

His brother, Cy Denneny also played ice hockey and is a member of the Hockey Hall of Fame.

== Personal life ==
He was born and raised in Cornwall, Ontario. As a child Denneny excelled in lacrosse, signing a pro contract at age 14. In track and field, Denneny tied the 100 yard world record in a meet in Toronto. In the winter, Denneny played hockey and he moved to Toronto to play both sports. After his playing career ended, Denneny returned to Toronto, coaching the Toronto Tecumsehs minor league team. He later joined the YMCA, becoming head masseuse and eventually director of health services. Denneny, who was often listed as 'Dennenay' in newspaper reports eventually adopted the spelling.

Corb Denneny died in Toronto on January 16, 1963, after a long illness.

== Playing career ==
Corbett Denneny first played professional ice hockey for the Cobalt McKinley Mines of the Cobalt Mining Hockey League, playing two seasons from 1912 to 1914. He then joined the Toronto Ontarios of the National Hockey Association (NHA) for their 1914–15 season. He then played for the NHA's Toronto Blueshirts for the 1915–16 part of the 1916–17 seasons, before being traded to the Ottawa Senators where he would play with his brother Cy.

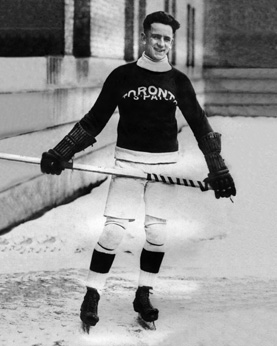
Denneny with the Toronto St. Patricks.

He returned to Toronto for the inaugural 1917–18 NHL season playing for the "Torontos", operated by the Toronto Arena Company. He stayed with the organization as it changed to the "Toronto Arenas" and "Toronto St. Patricks", and was a member of two Stanley Cup winners, in 1918 and 1922. During a six-week span in the 1920–21 NHL season, Corbett and his brother Cy (who still played for the now-NHL Ottawa Senators), each scored six goals during a game—a feat accomplished by only five other players in the history of the NHL.

After the 1922 Stanley Cup win, Denneny was traded to the Vancouver Maroons of the PCHA and lost the 1923 Stanley Cup against the Ottawa Senators and his brother Cy. Brothers Frank and Georges Boucher also played against each other in that series, marking the first time two different sets of brothers faced each other in an NHL or Big Four championship series. In the 1923–24 season, Denneny returned to NHL with Toronto and was traded to the Hamilton Tigers for whom he played for one season. After that season he was picked up by the WCHL's Saskatoon Sheiks, playing in the final two seasons of that major professional league. After the WCHL folded he played for the Sheiks in the Prairie Hockey League until he was traded back to the NHL, playing for the Toronto St. Patricks in the season they became the Toronto Maple Leafs. He was returned to the Sheiks when the trade was not finalized and finished the season with the Sheiks.

Denneny started the 1927–28 season with a return to the NHL when traded to the Chicago Black Hawks, playing his last games in the NHL before being traded back to the Sheiks mid-season. He would play three more professional seasons with the Minneapolis Millers (American Hockey Association/AHA), Newark Bulldogs (Canadian-American Hockey League) and Chicago Shamrocks (AHA), retiring after the 1930–31 season.

== Career statistics ==
=== Regular season and playoffs ===
			Regular season					Playoffs
Season	Team	League	GP	G	A	Pts	PIM	GP	G	A	Pts	PIM
1909–10	Cornwall Sons of England	LOVHL	—	—	—	—	—	—	—	—	—	—
1910–11	Cornwall Internationals	LOVHL	8	5	0	5	—	—	—	—	—	—
1911–12	Cornwall Internationals	LOVHL	8	5	0	5	16	—	—	—	—	—
1912–13	Cobalt McKinley Mines	CoMHL	9	7	0	7	9	—	—	—	—	—
1913–14	Cobalt McKinley Mines	CoMHL	9	13	0	13	11	—	—	—	—	—
1914–15	Toronto Ontarios	NHA	19	13	3	16	18	—	—	—	—	—
1915–16	Toronto Blueshirts	NHA	22	20	3	23	75	—	—	—	—	—
1916–17	Toronto Blueshirts	NHA	14	14	2	16	23	—	—	—	—	—
1916–17	Ottawa Senators	NHA	6	5	0	5	12	2	0	0	0	6
1917–18	Toronto Arenas	NHL	21	20	9	29	14	2	0	0	0	3
1917–18	Toronto Arenas	St-Cup	—	—	—	—	—	5	3	1	4	0
1918–19	Toronto Arenas	NHL	17	8	3	11	15	—	—	—	—	—
1919–20	Toronto St. Patricks	NHL	23	24	12	36	20	—	—	—	—	—
1920–21	Toronto St. Patricks	NHL	20	19	7	26	29	2	0	0	0	4
1921–22	Toronto St. Patricks	NHL	24	19	9	28	28	2	1	0	1	0
1921–22	Toronto St. Patricks	St-Cup	—	—	—	—	—	5	3	2	5	2
1922–23	Toronto St. Patricks	NHL	1	1	0	1	0	—	—	—	—	—
1922–23	Vancouver Maroons	PCHA	21	7	3	10	3	2	0	0	0	2
1922–23	Vancouver Maroons	St-Cup	—	—	—	—	—	3	0	0	0	0
1923–24	Hamilton Tigers	NHL	23	0	1	1	6	—	—	—	—	—
1924–25	Saskatoon Sheiks	WCHL	28	15	3	18	20	—	—	—	—	—
1925–26	Saskatoon Sheiks	WHL	30	17	15	32	12	—	—	—	—	—
1926–27	Toronto Maple Leafs	NHL	29	7	1	8	24	—	—	—	—	—
1926–27	Saskatoon Sheiks	PrHL	4	0	2	2	0	4	2	0	2	4
1927–28	Chicago Black Hawks	NHL	18	5	0	5	12	—	—	—	—	—
1927–28	Saskatoon Sheiks	PrHL	16	15	6	21	10	—	—	—	—	—
1928–29	Minneapolis Millers	AHA	7	0	1	1	0	—	—	—	—	—
1928–29	Newark Bulldogs	CAHL	27	11	7	18	36	—	—	—	—	—
1929–30	Minneapolis Millers	AHA	48	26	8	34	22	—	—	—	—	—
1930–31	Chicago Shamrocks	AHA	28	2	6	8	14	—	—	—	—	—
NHA totals			61	52	8	60	128	2	0	0	0	6
NHL totals			176	103	42	145	148	6	1	0	1	7

== See also ==
- List of players with 5 or more goals in an NHL game
