= Mutual Street Arena =

Arena

- Arena Gardens; The Arena; The Terrace
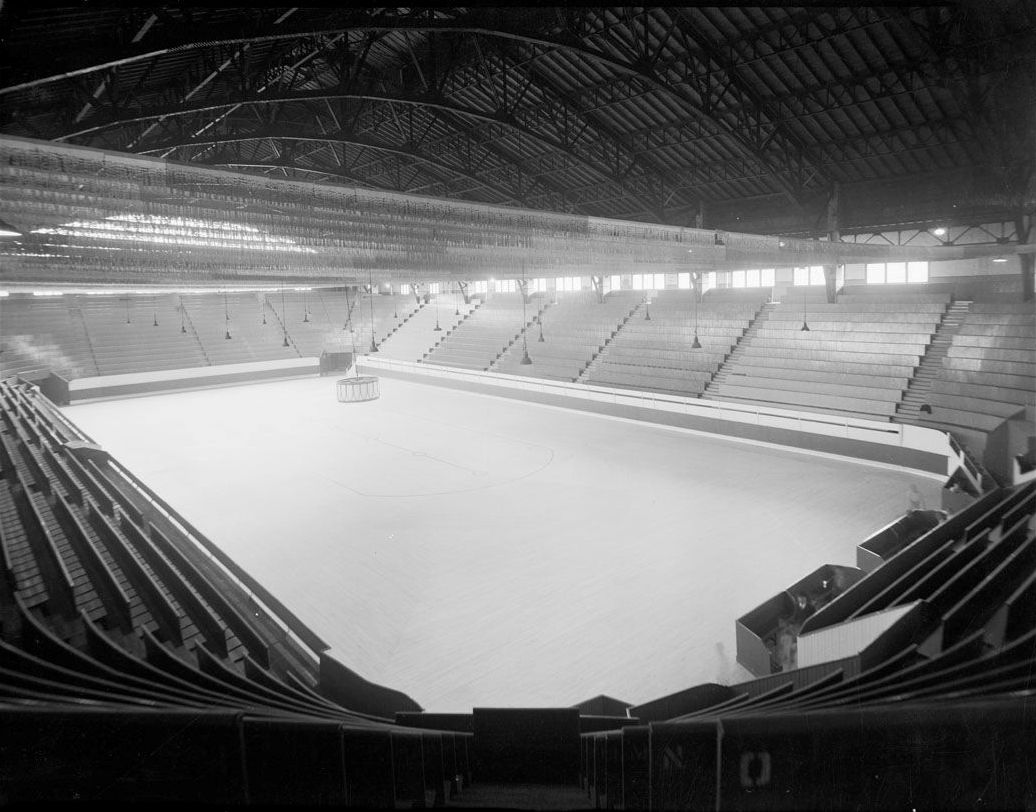
- Interactive map of Mutual Street Arena
- Former names: Arena Gardens (name at opening)
- Location: 68–88 Mutual Street, Toronto, Ontario
- Coordinates: 43°39′21″N 79°22′32″W
- Owner: The Arena Gardens of Toronto, Limited
- Capacity: seated: 6,000 standing: 7,500 (hockey)
- Surface: mechanically frozen ice

Construction
- Opened: 1912
- Demolished: 1989
- Cost: CA$500,000
- Architects: Ross and McFarlane of Montreal
- General contractors: Peter Lyall & Sons Limited

Tenants
- Toronto Tecumsehs (NHA) (1912–1913); Toronto Blueshirts (NHA) (1912-1917); Toronto Ontarios (NHA) (1913-1914); Toronto Shamrocks (NHA) (1914-1915); Toronto Aura Lee (OHA) (1916-1926); Toronto 228th Battalion (NHA) (1916-1917); Torontos/Toronto Arenas/St. Pats/Maple Leafs (NHL) (1917-1931); Toronto Marlboros (1926-1931); Toronto Falcons (IHL) (1929-1930); Toronto Tecumsehs (ILL); Toronto Maple Leafs (ILL) (1931)

Mutual Street Arena, initially called Arena Gardens or just the Arena, was an ice hockey arena and sports and entertainment venue in Toronto, Ontario, Canada. From 1912 until 1931, with the opening of Maple Leaf Gardens, it was the premier site of ice hockey in Toronto, being home to teams from the National Hockey Association (NHA), the National Hockey League (NHL), the Ontario Hockey Association (OHA) and the International Hockey League (IHL). It was the first home of the Toronto Maple Leafs, who played at the arena under various names for their first 13½ seasons. The Arena Gardens was the third rink in Canada to feature a mechanically frozen or 'artificial' ice surface (both Patrick Arena in Victoria and Denman Arena in Vancouver opened in 1911), and for eleven years was the only such facility in eastern Canada. In 1923, it was the site of the first radio broadcast of an ice hockey game, the first radio broadcast of an NHL game, and the first broadcast of an ice hockey game by long-time broadcaster Foster Hewitt.

The Arena was also used for musical concerts, gatherings, and other sporting events, including professional boxing, cycling, wrestling, and tennis. In 1962, it was converted into a curling club and roller skating rink known as The Terrace. The building was demolished in 1989 and the Cathedral Square residential complex and Arena Gardens municipal park now occupy the site. It was located on Mutual Street, just south of Dundas Street East and two blocks east of Church Street in downtown Toronto.

== History ==
It was constructed for a reported cost of CA$500,000 (equivalent to $12,968,755 in 2025) and opened in 1912. It was built on the site of the Mutual Street Rink, used primarily for curling and ice skating between Dundas Street East and Shuter Street. At the time, it was billed as the largest indoor arena in Canada and held about 7,500 for hockey. The rink was owned by the Toronto Arena Company, organized September 19, 1911, with Sir Henry Pellatt as president, Lol Solman as managing director, and directors Aemilius Jarvis, Joseph Kilgour, T.W. Horn, R.A. Smith, and Col. Carlson. There were two other directors from Montreal. W. J. Bellingham was the initial manager.

The Arena opened with a performance by Nathan Franko's Orchestra on October 7, 1912, supporting a recital by Alice Neville, soprano of the Metropolitan Opera, tenor Orville Harold, and a company of opera singers from the Boston Opera Company organized by Neville. It was the first of a series called the Toronto Music Festival. Entrances to the various blue and red seating sections were indicated by corresponding blue and red lights on the outside of the building. It was followed the next day by a recital by Johanna Gadski with Franko's orchestra. The festival continued all week, concluding on October 12 with a variety show headlined by Canadian theatre and film actress Marie Dressler. Americans Yvonne de Tréville, Charlotte Maconda and Rosa Olitzka sang arias from several operas while Dressler performed a comedic reading of the poem "The Glove" by Edward Bulwer-Lytton, singing "burlesque opera solos" to the accompaniment of Franko's orchestra.

Arena Gardens was initially home to two new teams in the National Hockey Association (NHA): the Toronto Hockey Club and the Tecumseh Hockey Club. Delays in construction meant that the teams could not play in the 1911–12 season, as was originally scheduled. The 12 miles (19 km) of piping for the artificial ice was installed improperly and had to be reinstalled in December 1912. The first professional ice hockey game in the building was on December 21, 1912, an exhibition between the Montreal Canadiens and Montreal Wanderers. Sprague Cleghorn was suspended for four weeks and fined $65 by the NHA for assaulting the Canadiens' Newsy Lalonde in the game. The first official game was on December 25, 1912, a game between the Canadiens and the Torontos. Upon the suspension of the NHA in 1917, the professional franchise of the new National Hockey League (NHL) for Toronto was operated by the Toronto Arena itself. The franchise was operated by the Arena for two years before being sold to become the Toronto St. Patricks. The St. Pats became the Toronto Maple Leafs in 1927 and played at Arena Gardens until the completion of Maple Leaf Gardens in 1931. Until 1923, the Arena was the only facility east of Manitoba with artificial ice-making capability. With this in mind, the St. Pats often let other teams use the Arena as a neutral site during the early and late months of the season when it was usually too warm for proper ice.

The year 1922 saw the first professional wrestling bout at the Arena, between former world champion Stanislaus Zbyszko and Canadian champion George Walker. Professional wrestling would continue at the Arena until 1938. Promoter Ivan Mickailof began promoting weekly shows in 1929. Some of the names that Mickailof presented at the Arena included Strangler Lewis and Toots Mondt, as well as reigning world champions Gus Sonnenberg, Ed Don George, Henri Deglane, Jim Londos, Ali Baba, Vic Christie, Everett Marshall and Billy Weidner, who all defended their titles at the Arena.

On February 8, 1923, the first radio broadcast of an ice hockey game was made from the Arena by the Toronto Daily Star's CFCA radio station. Norman Albert did the play-by-play of the third period of a game between North Toronto and Midland, won by North Toronto 16–4. Later that season, Foster Hewitt made his first radio broadcasts from the Arena, also on CFCA. A game on February 14, 1923, between the Toronto St. Pats and Ottawa Senators was the first NHL game broadcast on radio. The Stanley Cup Final was played at Arena Gardens four times: 1914, 1918, 1920 and 1922. Arena Gardens also hosted the Memorial Cup finals nine times from 1919 to 1931. The Gardens also hosted the Allan Cup final series. A 1931 game between the Montreal Canadiens and the Maple Leafs was filmed by the National Film Board of Canada.

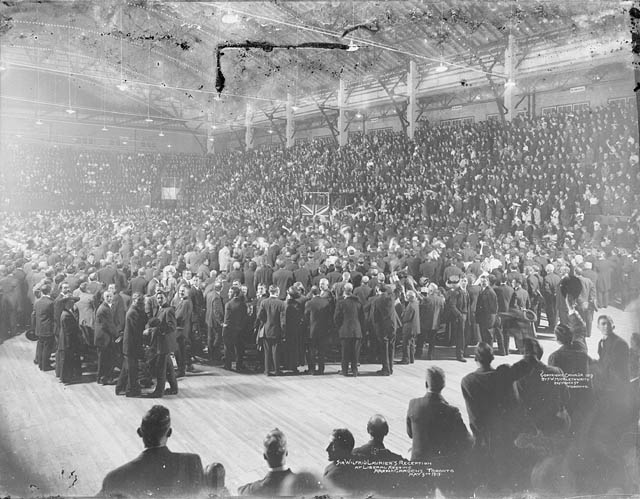
1913 Liberal Party Reception for Wilfrid Laurier at Arena Gardens

The building was also used for mass assemblies. An assembly was held for Sir Wilfrid Laurier in 1913 by the Liberal Party of Canada. On June 10, 1925, this building was used as the venue for the inaugural service of the United Church of Canada, which united four existing denominations: the Presbyterians, the Methodist Church of Canada, the Congregational Union of Canada, and the Association of Local Union Churches. On December 3, 1933, 7,000 persons attended a memorial service for Sir Arthur Currie, commander of the Canadian Corps in World War I. On October 9, 1936, it was the site of a mass assembly by the Communist Party of Canada.

After the Maple Leafs left in 1931, the building was no longer a venue for professional ice hockey but remained open as a venue for sports and entertainment. Some of the other sports included bicycle racing, professional boxing, and tennis. By 1934, revenues did not keep up with interest on bonds on the property, property taxes, and the expenses of operating the arena. The bondholders made it known that the building was for sale. By 1937, with $200,000 of bonds in default, and the Arena in default of 1933 and 1934 taxes of nearly $16,000, and a similar amount estimated for 1936 and 1937, the Arena was listed for sale by the City of Toronto.

In 1938, the Arena was leased to Edward "Ted" Dickson who turned it into a recreation facility offering ice skating in winter and roller skating in summer. The name was changed that year to the Mutual Street Arena. The Glenn Miller big band played at the Arena in January 1942, Miller's only appearance in Toronto. Frank Sinatra made his first appearance in Toronto here in 1949. Roller hockey was introduced to the Arena in the late 1940s. Hank Williams Sr played a concert at the Arena in 1952. The city's first boat show was held in 1954. The Melody Fair theatre-in-the-round operated at the Arena in 1954.

Dickson bought the building in 1945 and it remained in the family for the next 43 years. The arena was renovated for $3 million in 1962, adding 18 curling sheets, year-round roller skating, a parking garage, and a new facade. The Arena was renamed "The Terrace", a name it kept until it was sold in 1988. It closed its doors on April 30, 1989, and was demolished a few months later. The site was converted into a residential development with some of the site reserved for a city park. The Terrace name was retained for one of the residential buildings. In May 2011, the name of the city park on the site was changed from Cathedral Square Park to Arena Gardens.

== Events ==
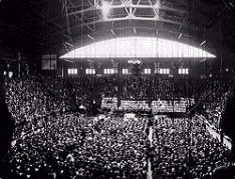
Photograph of United Church inaugural service

This list is incomplete.

- October 7, 1912 - Grand opening
- February 8, 1923 - First radio broadcast of an ice hockey game
- February 14, 1923 - First radio broadcast of an NHL game
- June 10, 1925 - Inaugural service of United Church of Canada
- December 3, 1933 - Memorial service for Sir Arthur Currie
- January 23, 1942 - Only Toronto appearance by Glenn Miller and big band
- May 6, 1952 - Concert by Hank Williams Sr. and the Grand Ole Opry Show.

=== Stanley Cup series ===
- March 14–19, 1914 - Toronto Blueshirts – Victoria Aristocrats Stanley Cup series
- March 20–30, 1918 - Torontos - Vancouver Millionaires Stanley Cup series
- March 30–April 1, 1920 - Two games of Ottawa Senators - Seattle Metropolitans Stanley Cup series
- March 17–28, 1922 - Toronto St. Patricks - Vancouver Millionaires Stanley Cup series

=== Memorial Cup series ===
- 1919 - University of Toronto Schools (OHA) vs. Abbott Cup champions Regina Pats
- 1920 - Toronto Canoe Club Paddlers (OHA) vs. Abbott Cup champions Selkirk Fishermen (MJHL)
- 1921 - Stratford Midgets (OHA) vs. Abbott Cup champions Winnipeg Junior Falcons (MJHL)
- 1923 - Kitchener Colts (OHA) vs. Abbott Cup champions University of Manitoba (MJHL)
- 1925 - Toronto Aura Lee (OHA) vs. Abbott Cup champions Regina Pats (SSJHL)
- 1927 - George Richardson Memorial Trophy champions Owen Sound Greys (OHA) vs. Abbott Cup champions Port Arthur West Ends (TBJHL)
- 1928 - George Richardson Memorial Trophy champions Ottawa Gunners (OCJHL) vs. Abbott Cup champions Regina Monarchs (SSJHL)
- 1929 - George Richardson Memorial Trophy champions Toronto Marlboros (OHA) vs. Abbott Cup champions Elmwood Millionaires (MJHL)
- 1931 - George Richardson Memorial Trophy champions Ottawa Primroses (OCJHL) vs. Abbott Cup champions Elmwood Millionaires (MJHL)

== See also ==
- Maple Leaf Gardens
- Scotiabank Arena
- Coca-Cola Coliseum
- Varsity Arena

== Bibliography ==
- Filey, Mike (1989). Like no other in the world: the story of the Toronto' Skydome. Toronto, Ontario: Sun Controlled Ventures. ISBN 0-919233-31-7.
- Hunter, Douglas (1997). Champions: The Illustrated History of Hockey's Greatest Dynasties. Chicago, Illinois: Triumph Books. ISBN 1-57243-213-6.
- Kitchen, Paul (2008). Win, Tie, or Wrangle: The Inside Story of the Old Ottawa Senators - 1883–1935. Manotick, Ontario: Penumbra Press. ISBN 978-1-897323-46-5.
- Podnieks, Andrew (1995). The Blue and White Book. Toronto, Ontario: ECW Press. ISBN 1-55022-263-5.

Preceded by first arena	Home of the Toronto Arenas/St. Pats/Maple Leafs; 1917 – 1931	Succeeded by Maple Leaf Gardens
