= 1921–22 NHL season =

Professional ice hockey league season

- League: National Hockey League
- Sport: Ice hockey
- Duration: December 17, 1921 – March 13, 1922
- Games: 24
- Teams: 4

Regular season
- Season champions: Ottawa Senators
- Top scorer: Punch Broadbent (Senators)

O'Brien Cup
- Champions: Toronto St. Patricks
- Runners-up: Ottawa Senators

NHL seasons
- ← 1920–21 1922–23 →

The 1921–22 NHL season was the fifth season of the National Hockey League (NHL). Four teams each played 24 games. The league dropped the split season and the two top teams played off for the league championship. The second-place Toronto St. Patricks defeated the first-place Ottawa Senators for the league championship.

For the first four seasons of the NHL, the winner of the league playoffs had faced the winner of the Pacific Coast Hockey Association (PCHA) for the Stanley Cup. That changed this season with the introduction of another professional hockey league called the Western Canada Hockey League (WCHL). Now, three leagues were competing for the coveted Stanley Cup. The winner of a playoff between the PCHA and the WCHL travelled to Toronto to play off for the Stanley Cup. The St. Patricks defeated the Vancouver Millionaires to win the Stanley Cup.

== League business ==
This was the first season away from the split season used in the NHA and the first four NHL seasons. Under the old split system, the winner of each half of the season would face each other in the playoffs. If the same team won both halves, then there would be no league playoffs and that team would simply move on to the Stanley Cup series. For the new system, the top two teams at the end of the season squared off against each other in a two-game total goals series for the chance to move on to the Stanley Cup series.

The NHL adopted the penalty rules of the amateur Ontario Hockey Association (OHA) for this season. Starting this season, there was no substitution for penalized players and no deferred penalties This was therefore the first season of the power play in the NHL. Penalized players immediately had to serve their penalties in the penalty box. Also, the minor penalty was reduced to two minutes, and major fouls were assessed at five minutes. A match penalty was now awarded for deliberate attempts to injure.

Frank Calder, NHL president, again declared Sprague Cleghorn property of the Hamilton Tigers and Cleghorn balked at the move. The Tigers asked Cleghorn where he wanted to play other than Ottawa, and he expressed interest in joining his brother on the Montreal Canadiens and so prior to the start of this season, the NHL's first multiple-player trade in its history was made when Billy Coutu and Sprague Cleghorn of the Hamilton Tigers were traded to the Montreal Canadiens for Harry Mummery, Amos Arbour, and Cully Wilson.

Canadiens owner George Kennedy never recovered from the influenza he contracted in 1919, and died on October 19, 1921, at age 39. His widow sold the Canadiens to a unit that would be known affectionately as the Three Musketeers of owners, Leo Dandurand, Louis Letourneau, and Joseph Cattarinich. Dandurand became manager and coach, and immediately there were problems between him and Newsy Lalonde. At one point, Dandurand accused Lalonde of not trying, and also the fans started to boo their old hero. Finally, Lalonde walked out on the team. NHL president Frank Calder mediated the dispute and Lalonde returned to the team. But his days in Montreal were numbered.

== Regular season ==
After a fairly impressive season for the Toronto St. Patricks, the St. Pats goaltender Jake Forbes refused to play after being denied a raise, and was suspended for the season. John Ross Roach took over in goal.

Punch Broadbent was the star this year, as he scored 27 goals in 16 consecutive games en route to a 32-goal campaign. Broadbent led the league in goals, assists and points. His Ottawa team finished first, too.

On February 1, Sprague Cleghorn almost wiped out the Ottawa team singlehandedly. He cut Eddie Gerard and Cy Denneny and charged Frank Nighbor. All three players missed two games because of injuries and Cleghorn drew a match penalty and a $30 fine. Ottawa police tried to arrest him in wake of his one-man war.

=== Final standings ===
National Hockey League
	GP	W	L	T	Pts	GF	GA
**Ottawa Senators**	24	14	8	2	30	106	84
**Toronto St. Patricks**	24	13	10	1	27	98	97
Montreal Canadiens	24	12	11	1	25	88	94
Hamilton Tigers	24	7	17	0	14	88	105

Note: GP = Games played, W = Wins, L = Losses, T = Ties, Pts = Points, GF = Goals for, GA = Goals against
Teams that qualified for the playoffs are highlighted in bold.

== Playoffs ==
Starting in the Western Canada Hockey League, the Calgary Tigers lost to the Regina Capitals in a match-up to determine second place. The Capitals then went on to beat the first place Edmonton Eskimos in that league's first championship series. Over in the Pacific Coast Hockey Association, once again, the Vancouver Millionaires faced the Seattle Metropolitans for their league championship. The Mets had the better regular season record, but the Millionaires won both games of the playoffs by 1–0 scores. The Millionaires were then matched up against the Capitals to see who would go on to play against the winner of the NHL's playoffs. Vancouver beat Regina in the two-game total-goals series.

=== NHL Championship ===
In the O'Brien Trophy playoffs, the first-place Ottawa Senators played off against the second-place Toronto St. Patricks in a two-game total-goals series. Played 15 years before icing became an infraction, the St. Pats used a strategy of icing the puck multiple times to defend their lead.

March 11	Ottawa Senators	4-5	Toronto St. Patricks	Mutual Street Arena	Recap
Frank Nighbor (1) – 07:05; Cy Denneny (1) – 08:05; Cy Denneny (2) – 12:05		First period	00:30 – Ken Randall (1); 03:05 – Billy Stuart (1)
Frank Nighbor (2) – 11:00		Second period	08:30 – Babe Dye (1); 19:30 – Babe Dye (2)
No scoring		Third period	15:00 – Corb Denneny (1)

March 13	Toronto St. Patricks	0-0	Ottawa Senators	The Arena	Recap
No scoring		First period	No scoring
No scoring		Second period	No scoring
No scoring		Third period	No scoring

Toronto won the series on total goals 5-4

=== Stanley Cup Finals ===
March 17	Vancouver Millionaires	4–3	Toronto St. Patricks	Mutual Street Arena	Recap
Jack Adams (1) – 02:30; Jack Adams (2) – 05:30; Mickey MacKay (1) – 14:30		First period	01:07 – Babe Dye (3); 10:30 – Ken Randall (2)
No scoring		Second period	08:00 – Babe Dye (4)
Jack Adams (3) – 16:30		Third period	No scoring
Hugh Lehman		Goalie stats	John Ross Roach

March 21	Vancouver Millionaires	1–2	OT	Toronto St. Patricks	Mutual Street Arena	Recap
Jack Adams (4) – 13:00		First period		No scoring
No scoring		Second period		No scoring
No scoring		Third period		01:45 – Corb Denneny (2)
No scoring		First overtime period		04:50 – Babe Dye (5)
Hugh Lehman		Goalie stats		John Ross Roach

March 23	Vancouver Millionaires	3–0	Toronto St. Patricks	Mutual Street Arena	Recap
Lloyd Cook (1) – 15:00		First period	No scoring
Jack Adams (5) – 04:00		Second period	No scoring
Eddie Oatman (1) – 18:00		Third period	No scoring
Hugh Lehman		Goalie stats	John Ross Roach

March 25	Vancouver Millionaires	0–6	Toronto St. Patricks	Mutual Street Arena	Recap
No scoring		First period	12:00 – Lloyd Andrews (1); 15:00 - Babe Dye (6)
No scoring		Second period	06:00 – Babe Dye (7); 10:00 – Lloyd Andrews (2); 18:00 – Corb Denneny (3)
No scoring		Third period	17:00 – Rod Smylie (1)
Hugh Lehman		Goalie stats	John Ross Roach

March 28	Vancouver Millionaires	1–5	Toronto St. Patricks	Mutual Street Arena	Recap
No scoring		First period	03:00 – Babe Dye (8); 04:20 – Babe Dye (9)
No scoring		Second period	07:00 – Corb Denneny (4)
Jack Adams (6) – 18:15		Third period	01:15 – Babe Dye (10); 08:15 – Babe Dye (11)
Hugh Lehman		Goalie stats	John Ross Roach

Toronto won series 3–2

=== NHL Playoff scoring leader ===
Note: GP = Games played; G = Goals; A = Assists; Pts = Points

Player	Team	GP	G	A	Pts	PIM
Babe Dye	Toronto St. Patricks	7	11	1	12	

== Awards ==
O'Brien Cup — Toronto St. Patricks

== Player statistics ==
=== Scoring leaders ===
Note: GP = Games played; G = Goals; A = Assists; Pts = Points

Player	Team	GP	G	A	Pts	PIM
Punch Broadbent	Ottawa Senators	24	32	14	46	28
Cy Denneny	Ottawa Senators	22	27	12	39	20
Cecil Dye	Toronto St. Patricks	24	31	7	38	39
Harry Cameron	Toronto St. Patricks	24	18	17	35	22
Joe Malone	Hamilton Tigers	24	24	7	31	4
Corbett Denneny	Toronto St. Patricks	24	19	9	28	28
Reg Noble	Toronto St. Patricks	24	17	11	28	19
Sprague Cleghorn	Montreal Canadiens	24	17	9	26	80
George Boucher	Ottawa Senators	23	13	12	25	12
Odie Cleghorn	Montreal Canadiens	23	21	3	24	26

=== Leading goaltenders ===
GP = Games Played, GA = Goals Against, SO = Shutouts, GAA = Goals Against Average

Name	Team	GP	Mins	W	L	T	GA	SO	GAA
Ivan Mitchell	Toronto St. Patricks	2	120	2	0	0	6	0	3.00
Clint Benedict	Ottawa Senators	24	1510	14	8	2	84	2	3.34
Georges Vezina	Montreal Canadiens	24	1469	12	11	1	94	0	3.84
John Ross Roach	Toronto St. Patricks	22	1340	11	10	1	91	0	4.07
Howie Lockhart	Hamilton Tigers	24	1409	6	17	0	103	0	4.39

Source: NHL

== Coaches ==
- Hamilton Tigers: Joe Malone
- Montreal Canadiens: Newsy Lalonde
- Ottawa Senators: Pete Green
- Toronto St. Patricks: George O'Donoghue

== Debuts ==
The following is a list of players of note who played their first NHL game in 1921–22 (listed with their first team, asterisk(*) marks debut in playoffs):

- Billy Boucher, Montreal Canadiens
- Frank Boucher, Ottawa Senators
- King Clancy, Ottawa Senators
- John Ross Roach, Toronto St. Patricks

The last remaining active player to kick off their NHL career this season was Frank Boucher, who played his final NHL game in the 1943–44 season, although he missed the 1922–23, 1923–24, 1924–25, 1925–26, 1938–39, 1939–40, 1940–41, 1941–42, and 1942–43 seasons.

== Last games ==
The following is a list of players of note that played their last game in the NHL in 1921–22 (listed with their last team):

== Free agency ==
Date	Players	Team
December 5, 1921	John Ross Roach	Toronto St. Patricks
December 13, 1921	Billy Boucher	Montreal Canadiens
December 14, 1921	King Clancy	Ottawa Senators

== Transactions ==
November 9, 1921	To Hamilton Tigers Cully Wilson	To Toronto St. Patricks Ed Carpenter
November 26, 1921	To Hamilton Tigers Amos Arbour; Harry Mummery	To Montreal Canadiens Sprague Cleghorn

== See also ==
- 1921 in sports
- 1922 in sports
- List of Stanley Cup champions
- Pacific Coast Hockey Association
- Western Canada Hockey League
