= Toronto St. Patricks =

Canadian professional ice hockey team

- Founded: Toronto Hockey Club; 1917–1918; Toronto Arenas; 1918–1919; Toronto St. Patricks; 1919–1927; Toronto Maple Leafs; 1927–present
- Home arena: Arena Gardens
- City: Toronto, Ontario
- Team colours: Green, white
- Owner(s): Toronto St. Patricks partnership (Fred Hambly, Percy Hambly, Paul Ciceri, Charlie Querrie, Richard Greer)
- Stanley Cups: 1 (1922)

The Toronto St. Patricks (colloquially known as the St. Pats) were a professional ice hockey team which began playing in the National Hockey League (NHL) in 1919. The Toronto NHL franchise (league membership) had previously been held by the Arena Company (and the team called the "Arenas"), but despite winning the Stanley Cup the team was bankrupt and pulled out of the league after just two seasons. The rights to the Toronto franchise were purchased by a group of investors with links to an amateur club called the "St. Patricks". The new owners renamed the NHL franchise after the amateur club, and as the St. Patricks the team won the Stanley Cup in 1922. Jack Bickell invested in the St. Patricks in 1924 as a favour to Charlie Querrie. In 1927, when Charlie Querrie and other investors wanted out, Bickell made arrangements for other Toronto investors and initially hired Mike Rodden (a referee and sports writer) to run the hockey operations, which did not work out. He then hired Conn Smythe as the Managing Partner. The team was renamed to the Toronto Maple Leafs during the 1926–27 NHL season.

== History ==
=== Early years ===
The St. Pats organization had operated amateur hockey clubs in the Toronto area since the first decade of the 1900s, including the senior amateur St. Patricks team in the Ontario Hockey Association.

The Toronto franchise of the National Hockey League (NHL), since the NHL's founding in 1917, had been operated by the Arena Company, operators of the Arena Gardens in Toronto. The Arena Company had been granted a temporary franchise for the 1917–18 season, and leased the players from the Toronto Blueshirts from owner Eddie Livingstone while litigation was underway between Livingstone and the NHL. This temporary franchise won the Stanley Cup in 1918. However, instead of returning the players to Livingstone, the Arena Company formed the Toronto Arena Hockey Club, popularly known as the Toronto Arenas, with Arena Company auditor Hubert Vearncombe as team president. This new organization was duly admitted to the NHL as a full member in good standing, touching off a new round of litigation with Livingstone which forced the Arenas to unload most of their stars. They only won five games in 1918–19, and were forced to suspend operations in February.

Livingstone won a $20,000 judgment against the Arena Company, which declared bankruptcy to avoid paying the bill. Before the 1919–20 season, general manager Charlie Querrie learned that the Arena Company wanted to sell. As an interim measure, Querrie changed the team name to the Tecumsehs on December 7, 1919. The following day, Querrie reached agreement with the owners of the amateur St. Patrick's club to purchase the franchise. Frank Heffernan was named as manager. On December 13, 1919, the NHL transferred the Toronto franchise to the Querrie-St. Patricks group, for the fee of $5,000. The incorporation date of the club was December 22, 1919, and listed Fred Hambly, Percy Hambly, Paul Ciceri and Querrie with 99 shares each, and Richard Greer with 4 shares. This move was possible because the Arena Hockey Club was a self-contained corporation, and was therefore beyond the legal reach of Livingstone.

Although Querrie returned, player turnover was nearly 100%, partly because the Quebec NHL franchise was activating for this season, and the players that had been loaned to the Arenas and other NHL teams had been returned to Quebec. Additionally, with the poor performance of the previous season, and the turnover in franchise management, the franchise essentially started over. The club improved to second and third-place finishes in the halves of the schedule.

In 1920–21, the club placed second and first in the schedule halves, enough to make a playoff appearance. Unfortunately, the 'Super Six' of Ottawa would dominate the club 7–0 in a two-game total goals playoff. The experience would be helpful in the following season, however.

=== 1922 Stanley Cup champions ===
In the 1921–22 season, the St. Pats made their first and only appearance in the Stanley Cup Final. After placing second in the league standings, the club upset first place Ottawa to win the NHL championship and face Vancouver in the final. A fifth and deciding game five was necessary in this series to determine who would win the Cup. After Vancouver won game one, 4–3, Babe Dye scored 4:50 into overtime of game two to give Toronto a 2–1 win. Then in game three, goaltender Hugh Lehman led the Millionaires to a 3–0 shutout win. However, the St. Patricks tied the series in game four, 6–0, as John Ross Roach became the first rookie goaltender to record a Stanley Cup shutout. game five belonged to Toronto as Dye scored four goals in a 5–1 victory to clinch the Cup. For the series, Dye scored nine of the St. Pats 16 goals, while Roach posted a 1.80 goals-against average.

=== Later years ===
In the following two seasons, the St. Pats would miss the playoffs with third-place finishes. Losing money due to poor attendance, the Hamblys sold their shares in the St. Patricks to Nathan Nathanson, owner of the Famous Players Theatre chain, and mining magnate J. P. Bickell in December 1924.

In 1924–25, the club would place second and play off against the Montreal Canadiens. While Hamilton had placed first, the club was on strike, making the St. Pats-Canadiens semi-final the de facto final. The Canadiens would win the playoff to advance to the Stanley Cup Final.

In 1925–26, the club struggled to a sixth placing, finishing behind the expansion Pittsburgh and New York clubs. Top scorer Babe Dye struggled and the club finished sixth out of seven teams. The Canadiens had lost their top goalie Georges Vezina and placed last. In 1926–27, the club finished fifth and last in the new Canadian division. Dye was sold to the new Chicago Black Hawks team for cash.

=== Franchise sale and renaming to the Maple Leafs ===
The club was in trouble in 1927, both on the ice and legally. Querrie lost a lawsuit to Livingstone and decided, along with major shareholder Nathan Nathanson to put the St. Pats up for sale. There was a $200,000 bid from a group in Philadelphia. However, at shareholder Jack Bickell's direction, the Toronto Varsity Graduates coach Conn Smythe headed an ownership group and made a CA$160,000 (equivalent to $2,887,033 in 2025) offer for the majority ownership of the club. With the support of Bickell, who retained his share of the club, the Philadelphia bid was rejected, Smythe arguing that civic pride was more important than money.

After taking control on February 14, 1927, Smythe immediately renamed the team the Toronto Maple Leafs, after the national symbol of Canada. He attributed his choice of a maple leaf for the logo to his experiences as a Canadian Army officer and prisoner of war during World War I. Viewing the maple leaf as a "badge of courage", and a reminder of home, Smythe decided to give the same name to his hockey team, in honour of the many Canadian soldiers who wore it. However, the team was not the first to use the name. A Toronto minor-league baseball team had used the name "Maple Leafs" since 1895.

Initial reports were that the team's colours were to be red and white, but the Leafs wore white sweaters with a green maple leaf for their first game on February 17, 1927. On September 27, 1927, it was announced that the Leafs had changed their colour scheme to blue and white. Although Smythe later stated he chose blue because it represents the Canadian skies and white to represent snow, these colours were also used on his gravel and sand business' trucks. The colour blue was also a colour historically associated with the City of Toronto. The use of blue by top-level Toronto-based sports clubs began with the Argonaut Rowing Club in the 19th century, later adopted by their football team, the Toronto Argonauts, in 1873.

The NHL uses the abbreviation TSP to distinguish player records of the Toronto St. Patricks from the previous Arenas (TAN) and subsequent Maple Leafs (TOR).

== Seasons ==
Stanley Cup Champions	Conference champions	Division Champions/Reg. Season Leader	League leader

Note: GP = Games played, W = Wins, L = Losses, T = Ties, OTL = Overtime losses, Pts = Points, GF = Goals for, GA = Goals against, PIM = Penalties in minutes, TG = Playoff series decided on total goals

Season	GP	W	L	T	OTL	Pts	GF	GA	PIM	Finish	Playoffs
1919–20	24	12	12	0	--	24	119	106	219	3rd in NHL(1st half); 2nd in NHL(2nd half)	Did not qualify
1920–21	24	15	9	0	--	30	105	100	254	2nd in NHL(1st half); 1st in NHL(2nd half)	Lost in NHL Finals (Senators)
1921–22	24	13	10	1	--	27	98	97	114	2nd in NHL	Stanley Cup Champions, 3–2 (Millionaires)
1922–23	24	13	10	1	--	27	82	88	200	3rd in NHL	Did not qualify
1923–24	24	10	14	0	--	20	59	85	178	3rd in NHL	Did not qualify
1924–25	30	19	11	0	--	38	90	84	249	2nd in NHL	Lost in NHL Finals (Canadiens)
1925–26	36	12	21	3	--	27	92	114	325	6th in NHL	Did not qualify
1926–27^{1}	44	15	24	5	--	35	79	94	546	5th in Canadian	Did not qualify

== Prominent players ==
- Harry Cameron
- Babe Dye

== Coaches ==
- Frank Heffernan
- Harvey Sproule
- Frank Carroll
- George O'Donoghue
- Charlie Querrie
- Eddie Powers
- Mike Rodden

== See also ==
- Eddie Livingstone
- Toronto Maple Leafs
- History of the National Hockey League
- History of the Toronto Maple Leafs
- List of Stanley Cup champions
- 1922 Stanley Cup Final

Preceded by Ottawa Senators; 1921	Toronto St. Pats; Stanley Cup Champions; 1922	Succeeded by Ottawa Senators; 1923
