= List of NHL records (team) =

This is a list of team records recognized by the National Hockey League through the end of the 2025–26 NHL season.

== Season records ==
During the first eight years the NHL existed, teams played between 18 and 36 games in a season. Beginning in 1926, teams played 44–60 games. This ended in 1949 where teams now play 70 or more games. There have been four instances since then when teams have played fewer than 70 games in a season. Both the 1994–95 season and 2012–13 season were reduced to 48 games due to lockouts. The 2019–20 season and 2020–21 season were reduced due to the COVID-19 pandemic. For more information, check the History of the National Hockey League.

=== 1949–50 to present ===
- Most points: 135, by the 2022–23 Boston Bruins
- Fewest points: 21, by the 1974–75 Washington Capitals
- Most wins: 65, by the 2022–23 Boston Bruins
- Fewest wins: 8, by the 1974–75 Washington Capitals
- Most ties: 24, by the 1969–70 Philadelphia Flyers
- Fewest ties: 2, by the 1992–93 San Jose Sharks
- Most shootout wins: 15, by the 2007–08 Edmonton Oilers
- Most shootout losses: 13, by the 2013–14 New Jersey Devils
- Most losses: 71, by the 1992–93 San Jose Sharks
- Fewest losses (including overtime and shootout): 8, by the 1976–77 Montreal Canadiens
- Fewest regulation losses: 5, by the 2022–23 Boston Bruins
- Most goals for: 446, by the 1983–84 Edmonton Oilers
- Fewest goals for: 133, by the 1953–54 Chicago Black Hawks
- Most goals against: 446, by the 1974–75 Washington Capitals
- Fewest goals against: 131, by the 1953–54 Toronto Maple Leafs and 1955–56 Montreal Canadiens

=== 1926–27 to 1948–49 ===
- Most points: 83, by the 1943–44 Montreal Canadiens
- Fewest points: 12, by the 1930–31 Philadelphia Quakers
- Most wins: 38, by the 1929–30 Boston Bruins, 1943–44 Montreal Canadiens, and 1944–45 Montreal Canadiens
- Fewest wins: 4, by the 1930–31 Philadelphia Quakers
- Most ties: 15, by the 1928–29 Montreal Canadiens and 1942–43 Chicago Black Hawks
- Fewest ties: 1, by the 1929–30 Boston Bruins
- Most losses: 39, by the 1943–44 New York Rangers
- Fewest losses: 5, by the 1943–44 Montreal Canadiens and 1929–30 Boston Bruins
- Most goals for: 234, by the 1943–44 Montreal Canadiens
- Fewest goals for: 33, by the 1928–29 Chicago Black Hawks
- Most goals against: 310, by the 1943–44 New York Rangers
- Fewest goals against: 43, by the 1928–29 Montreal Canadiens

=== 1917–18 to 1925–26 ===
- Most points: 52, by the 1925–26 Ottawa Senators
- Fewest points: 8, by the 1919–20 Quebec Athletics
- Most wins: 24, by the 1925–26 Ottawa Senators
- Fewest wins: 4, by the 1919–20 Quebec Athletics
- Most ties: 5, by the 1925–26 Montreal Maroons
- Most losses: 24, by the 1924–25 Boston Bruins
- Fewest losses: 5 by the 1919–20 Ottawa Senators
- Most goals for: 129, by the 1919–20 Montreal Canadiens
- Fewest goals for: 45, by the 1924–25 Montreal Canadiens
- Most goals against: 177, by the 1919–20 Quebec Bulldogs
- Fewest goals against: 42, by the 1925–26 Ottawa Senators

=== Other season records ===
- Greatest points percentage: .875, by the 1929–30 Boston Bruins
- Lowest points percentage: .131, by the 1974–75 Washington Capitals
- Greatest goal differential: +216, by the 1976–77 Montreal Canadiens
- Lowest goal differential: -265, by the 1974–75 Washington Capitals
- Best power play percentage in a season: 32.40%, by the 2022–23 Edmonton Oilers
- Worst power play percentage in a season: 8.94%, by the 2020–21 Anaheim Ducks
- Best penalty kill percentage in a season: 89.58%, by the 2011–12 New Jersey Devils
- Worst penalty kill percentage in a season: 67.70%, by the 1979–80 Los Angeles Kings
- Best home record: 36–2–2 by the 1975–76 Philadelphia Flyers
- Worst home record: 7–28–5 by the 1974–75 Washington Capitals
- Best away record: 31–7–3 by the 2005–06 Detroit Red Wings
- Worst away record: 1–41–0, by the 1992–93 Ottawa Senators
- Most shutouts in a season: 22 of 44 games played (50.0%), by the 1928–29 Montreal Canadiens
- Most times shutout in a season: 20 of 44 games played (45.5%), by the 1928–29 Chicago Black Hawks

Notes: Ties were only recorded until 2003–04. In 1983, the NHL added a five-minute overtime, and ties would only occur after 65 minutes. Starting with the 1999-2000 season, the NHL credited one point to the team that lost in overtime, leading to a system in which teams could potentially earn three points between them in a single game, rather than a fixed number of two previously. In 2005, the league eliminated ties meaning that any game which went to overtime would be a three-point game. Games that didn't end in overtime would end in a shootout between the two teams. These changes in points awarded therefore make strict comparisons in wins, losses, and ties (after overtime, 1983–99, and in regulation, 1999–present) before and after these dates slightly problematic.

== Postseason records ==
- Longest playoff game: Detroit Red Wings vs Montreal Maroons on March 24, 1936 (60 minutes of regulation, 116 minutes, 30 seconds of overtime for a total of 176 minutes and 30 seconds. This game had 6 20-minute overtime periods).
- Most playoff games played (all teams): 130, during the 2020 Stanley Cup playoffs
- Most playoff games played (one team): 27, by 2019–20 Dallas Stars
- Most home playoff games won (one season): 12, by 2002–03 New Jersey Devils
- Most away playoff games won (one season): 10, by 1994–95 New Jersey Devils, 1999–2000 New Jersey Devils, 2003–04 Calgary Flames, 2011–12 Los Angeles Kings, 2017–18 Washington Capitals, 2018–19 St. Louis Blues, 2019–20 Dallas Stars, 2019–20 Tampa Bay Lightning and 2024–25 Florida Panthers
- Most home playoff games won (one season, consecutively): 11, by 1987–88 Edmonton Oilers
- Most away playoff games won (one season, consecutively): 10, by 2011–12 Los Angeles Kings
- Most playoff overtime games won (one season): 10, by 1992–93 Montreal Canadiens
- Most Stanley Cup-clinching overtime wins: 4, by the Montreal Canadiens (1944, 1953, 1966, 1977)
- Most playoff games won by an expansion team in their inaugural season: 13, by 2017–18 Vegas Golden Knights
- Most playoff games played without appearing in the Stanley Cup Final (one season): 22, by 2019–20 New York Islanders
- Most playoff games lost (one season): 12, by 2013–14 New York Rangers, 2014–15 Tampa Bay Lightning and 2019–20 Dallas Stars
- Most Stanley Cup-clinching overtime losses: 2, by the Toronto Maple Leafs (1933, 1940), Montreal Canadiens (1951, 1954), Detroit Red Wings (1934, 1966), Boston Bruins (1953, 1977), Philadelphia Flyers (1980, 2010), and New York Rangers (1950, 2014)
- Most consecutive playoff games won: 14, by Pittsburgh Penguins (Streak started on May 9, 1992 with three straight wins against the New York Rangers, four against Boston, four against Chicago in the Final, then three straight against New Jersey the next year. The streak would end on April 25, 1993 with a 4–1 loss to New Jersey.)
- Most consecutive playoff games won in a single season: 11, by 1991–92 Chicago Blackhawks, 1991–92 Pittsburgh Penguins, and 1992–93 Montreal Canadiens
- Most consecutive playoff games lost: 16, by Chicago Blackhawks from April 20, 1975 to April 8, 1980.

== Postseason goals scored ==
- Most playoff goals scored in a series by one team: 44, by the Edmonton Oilers against the Chicago Black Hawks during the 1985 Stanley Cup playoffs
- Most playoff goals scored in a series by both teams: 69, (44 by the Edmonton Oilers and 25 by the Chicago Black Hawks)
- Fewest playoff goals scored in a series by one team: 1, by the Minnesota Wild against the Mighty Ducks of Anaheim
- Fewest playoff goals scored in a series by winning team: 7, by the Vegas Golden Knights against the Los Angeles Kings
- Fewest playoff goals scored in a series by both teams: 10, (7 by the Vegas Golden Knights and 3 by the Los Angeles Kings), (9 by the Mighty Ducks of Anaheim and 1 by the Minnesota Wild)
- Most playoff goals scored by one team in one game: 13, by the Edmonton Oilers on April 9, 1987
- Most playoff goals scored by one team in one period: 7, by the Montreal Canadiens on March 30, 1944
- Most playoff goals scored by both teams in one game: 18, (Los Angeles Kings had 10 and the Edmonton Oilers 8) on April 7, 1982
- Most playoff goals scored by both teams in one period: 9, by the New York Rangers (6) and the Philadelphia Flyers (3) on April 24, 1979 and the Los Angeles Kings (5) and the Calgary Flames (4) on April 10, 1990
- Most consecutive playoff games played without a power play goal: 10, by the 2013–14 New York Rangers
- Most consecutive playoff power play chances without a goal: 36, by 2013–14 New York Rangers

== Season streaks ==
Longest Winning Streak

- Overall: 17 games, by 1992–93 Pittsburgh Penguins
- Home: 23 games, by 2011–12 Detroit Red Wings
- Away: 12 games, by 2005–06 Detroit Red Wings and 2014–15 Minnesota Wild

Longest Winning Streak to Start the Season

- Overall: 10 games, by 1993–94 Toronto Maple Leafs and 2006–07 Buffalo Sabres
- Home: 14 games, by 2022–23 Boston Bruins
- Away: 11 games, by 2023–24 Los Angeles Kings

Longest Winning Streak to End the Season

- Overall: 11 games, by 2005–06 New Jersey Devils

Longest Undefeated Streak

- Overall: 35 games, by 1979–80 Philadelphia Flyers (25 wins, 10 ties)
- Home: 34 games, by 1976–77 Montreal Canadiens
- Away: 23 games, by 1974–75 Montreal Canadiens

Longest Undefeated Streak to End the Season

- Overall: 18 games, by 1992–93 Pittsburgh Penguins (17 wins, one tie)

Longest Points Streak to Start the Season

- Overall: 24 games, by 2012–13 Chicago Blackhawks (21 wins, 3 shootout losses)

Longest Shootout Winning Streak

- Overall: 11 games, by 2005–06 Dallas Stars

Longest Shootout Losing Streak

- Overall: 18 games, by 2013–14 and 2014–15 New Jersey Devils (March 15, 2013 to October 24, 2014)

Longest Losing Streak

- Overall: 18 games, by 2003–04 Pittsburgh Penguins and by 2020–21 Buffalo Sabres
- Home: 14 games, by 2003–04 Pittsburgh Penguins
- Away: 38 games, by 1992–93 Ottawa Senators

Longest Losing Streak to Start the Season

- Overall: 11 games, by 1943–44 New York Rangers, 2017–18 Arizona Coyotes, 2021–22 Arizona Coyotes and 2023–24 San Jose Sharks

Longest Winless Streak

- Overall: 30 games, by 1980–81 Winnipeg Jets (23 losses, 7 ties)
- Home: 17 games, by 1995–96 Ottawa Senators and 1999–2000 Atlanta Thrashers
- Away: 38 games, by 1992–93 Ottawa Senators

Longest Winless Streak to Start the Season

- Overall: 15 games, by 1943–44 New York Rangers (14 losses, 1 tie)

Longest Consecutive Attendance Sellout:

- 633 games, by the Pittsburgh Penguins ended on October 19, 2021 (February 14, 2007 - October 16, 2021) (this record includes regular season and playoff games)

Notes:

- An undefeated streak includes wins and ties (although with the implementation of reduced-player overtime starting in 1998–99, ties are based at the end of regulation with each team earning one point, and the winner in overtime, or starting in 2005–06, the shootout, receiving a second point; the loser is credited with a point for regulation tie but given the overtime or shootout loss). A winless streak includes losses in regulation, overtime, shootouts, or ties. A losing streak includes losses in regulation (note from the implementation of overtime in 1983 until 1999, losses in overtime also counted, but abolished after overtime became reduced strength of four players each).

== Regular season miscellaneous ==
- Most penalty minutes in a season: 2713, by the 1991–92 Buffalo Sabres
- Most combined penalty minutes in a game: 419 (67 penalties), Ottawa Senators at Philadelphia Flyers on March 5, 2004
- Most consecutive penalties killed: 53, by the 1999–2000 Washington Capitals
- Most shorthanded goals in a season: 36, by the 1983–84 Edmonton Oilers
- Fewest shorthanded goals allowed in a season: 0, by the 2013–14 Nashville Predators
- Most shorthanded goals in one penalty: 3, by the 2009–10 Boston Bruins vs the Carolina Hurricanes
- Most combined goals in a game: 21, Toronto St. Patricks vs. Montreal Canadiens on January 10, 1920 (Montreal won 14–7); Edmonton Oilers vs. Chicago Black Hawks on December 11, 1985 (Edmonton won 12–9).
- Largest goal differential: Detroit Red Wings 15, New York Rangers 0 on January 23, 1944.
- Most games going past regulation in a single day: 8 on February 22, 2007 and November 27, 2015.
- Most games decided in a shootout: 21, by the 2013–14 Washington Capitals (10 wins, 11 losses)
- Most shootout goals in a single game: 11, Florida Panthers 6, Washington Capitals 5, on December 16, 2014.
- Most shootout goals on consecutive attempts: 9, Florida Panthers 5, New York Islanders 4, on November 27, 2015.
- Most rounds in a shootout: 20, by the Washington Capitals vs the Florida Panthers on December 16, 2014.
- Most points without reaching playoffs: 96, by the 2014–15 Boston Bruins, the 2017–18 Florida Panthers, 2018–19 Montreal Canadiens, and the 2024–25 Calgary Flames.
- Fewest games to reach 100 points: 61, by the 2022–23 Boston Bruins
- Most Presidents' Trophies since introduction during the 1985–86 season: 6, by the Detroit Red Wings
- Fewest points in an 80 or more game season to win the Presidents' Trophy: 101, by the 1989–90 Boston Bruins
- Most seasons with the best regular season record: 20, by the Montreal Canadiens
- Most conference titles during the regular season: 9, by the Philadelphia Flyers, Montreal Canadiens, and Detroit Red Wings
- Most division titles: 26, by the Boston Bruins
- Most consecutive division titles: 9 by the Quebec Nordiques/Colorado Avalanche (1 with final season in Quebec, 8 with Colorado)

== Playoffs miscellaneous ==
- Most Stanley Cups: 23, by the Montreal Canadiens (the Canadiens have won the Stanley Cup 24 times in total. Their first Stanley Cup championship came in 1916 as a member of the NHA)
- Oldest franchise(s) without a stanley cup: Buffalo Sabres and Vancouver Canucks, 52 seasons since inception in 1970–71 season
- Most consecutive Stanley Cup wins: 5, by the Montreal Canadiens (1956–1960)
- Longest Stanley Cup drought: 55 seasons by the Toronto Maple Leafs (1968–ongoing)
- Longest Stanley Cup Final drought (current): 55 seasons by the Toronto Maple Leafs (ongoing) (last appearance in 1967, includes season lost due to 2004–05 NHL lockout)
- Most Stanley Cup Final appearances: 33, by the Montreal Canadiens (Canadiens also reached the Stanley Cup Finals in 1914, 1916, 1917 while in NHA, before the NHL was formed.)
- Oldest franchise(s) to have never reached the Stanley Cup Finals: 39 seasons, by the Original Winnipeg Jets/Phoenix/Arizona Coyotes since inception in 1979–80 season
- Most consecutive Stanley Cup Final appearances: 10, by the Montreal Canadiens (1951–1960)
- Most consecutive victories in the Stanley Cup Finals: 10, by the Montreal Canadiens (1976–1978)
- Most consecutive defeats in the Stanley Cup Finals: 13, by the St. Louis Blues (1968–2019)
- Most sweeps in the Stanley Cup Final since the best-of-seven format was introduced in 1939: 6, by the Montreal Canadiens (1944, 1960, 1968, 1969, 1976, 1977)
- Longest playoff appearance streak: 29 years, by the Boston Bruins (1968–1996)
- Longest postseason drought: 14 seasons by the Buffalo Sabres (2012–2025)
- Most consecutive playoff series victories: 19, by the 1980–1984 New York Islanders, spanning four consecutive Stanley Cup titles and five playoff seasons. This is a record for all North American professional sports franchises.
- Most consecutive playoff series defeats: 12, by the Winnipeg Jets/Phoenix Coyotes from 1988–2011
- Most comebacks from a 3–1 playoff series deficit: 3, by the Vancouver Canucks (1992, 1994, 2003), Montreal Canadiens (2004, 2010, 2021), and New York Rangers (2014, 2015, 2022)
- Most comebacks from a 3–1 playoff series deficit in one season: 2, by the 2002–03 Minnesota Wild
- Most consecutive seasons in the Stanley Cup playoffs where a team has rebounded from a 3–1 deficit in a series: 2, by the New York Rangers
- Most 3–1 leads in a series to lose the last three games: 5 by the Washington Capitals (1987, 1992, 1995, 2010, 2015)
- Teams to come back from a 3–0 series deficit: Toronto Maple Leafs (1942 over the Detroit Red Wings Finals), New York Islanders (1975 over the Pittsburgh Penguins Quarter-Finals), Philadelphia Flyers (2010 over the Boston Bruins Conf Semi-Finals), Los Angeles Kings (2014 over the San Jose Sharks Conf Quarter-Finals)

Notes: The 2004–05 season was cancelled due to a lockout. The Phoenix Coyotes changed their name to the Arizona Coyotes before the 2014–15 season

== See also ==
- List of National Hockey League records (individual)
- List of National Hockey League statistical leaders
- List of NHL statistical leaders by country
- List of NHL franchise post-season droughts
