= 1919–20 Toronto St. Patricks season =

NHL hockey team season

1919–20 Toronto St. Patricks
- League: 3rd (1st half), 2nd (2nd half) NHL
- 1919–20 record: 12–12–0 (5–7–0, 7–5–0)
- Home record: 8–4–0
- Road record: 4–8–0
- Goals for: 119
- Goals against: 106

Team information
- General manager: Charles Querrie
- Coach: Frank Heffernan; Harvey Sproule
- Captain: Frank Heffernan
- Arena: Arena Gardens

Team leaders
- Goals: Corb Denneny; Reg Noble (24)
- Assists: Corb Denneny (12)
- Points: Corb Denneny (36)
- Penalty minutes: Cully Wilson (86)
- Wins: Ivan Mitchell (6)
- Goals against average: Jake Forbes (4.20)

The 1919–20 Toronto St. Patricks season was the third season of the Toronto National Hockey League franchise. The franchise was sold to the owners of the Toronto St. Patricks amateur hockey association and renamed the St. Patricks. The club improved on its record from the previous season, but did not make the playoffs as the Ottawa Senators won both halves of the season.

== Regular season ==
=== Final standings ===
First half
	GP	W	L	T	Pts	GF	GA
**Ottawa Senators**	12	9	3	0	**18**	59	23
Montreal Canadiens	12	8	4	0	**16**	62	51
Toronto St. Patricks	12	5	7	0	**10**	52	62
Quebec Athletics	12	2	10	0	**4**	44	81

Second half
	GP	W	L	T	Pts	GF	GA
**Ottawa Senators**	12	10	2	0	**20**	62	41
Toronto St. Patricks	12	7	5	0	**14**	67	44
Montreal Canadiens	12	5	7	0	**10**	67	62
Quebec Athletics	12	2	10	0	**4**	47	96

Note: GP = Games Played, W = Wins, L = Losses, T = Ties, Pts = Points, GF = Goals For, GA = Goals Against
Teams that qualified for the playoffs are highlighted in bold.

=== Record vs. opponents ===
1919–20 NHL Records
Team	MTL	OTT	QUE	TOR
Montreal	—	1–7	7–1	5–3
Ottawa	7–1	—	7–1	5–3
Quebec	1–7	1–7	—	2–6
Toronto	3–5	3–5	6–2	—

== Schedule and results ==
1919–20 regular season
First half

Game	Result	Date	Score	Opponent	Record
1	L	December 23, 1919	0–3	@ Ottawa Senators (1919–20)	0–1–0
2	W	December 27, 1919	7–4	Quebec Bulldogs (1919–20)	1–1–0
3	W	December 31, 1919	5–1	Montreal Canadiens (1919–20)	2–1–0
4	W	January 3, 1920	4–3	Ottawa Senators (1919–20)	3–1–0
5	L	January 7, 1920	5–7	@ Quebec Bulldogs (1919–20)	3–2–0
6	L	January 10, 1920	7–14	@ Montreal Canadiens (1919–20)	3–3–0
7	L	January 14, 1920	3–4	Montreal Canadiens (1919–20)	3–4–0
8	W	January 17, 1920	8–3	Quebec Bulldogs (1919–20)	4–4–0
9	L	January 21, 1920	2–3	@ Montreal Canadiens (1919–20)	4–5–0
10	W	January 24, 1920	5–3	Ottawa Senators (1919–20)	5–5–0
11	L	January 28, 1920	0–7	@ Ottawa Senators (1919–20)	5–6–0
12	L	January 31, 1920	6–10	@ Quebec Bulldogs (1919–20)	5–7–0

Second half

Game	Result	Date	Score	Opponent	Record
13	L	February 4, 1920	5–6	Montreal Canadiens (1919–20)	0–1–0
14	W	February 7, 1920	4–3	@ Ottawa Senators (1919–20)	1–1–0
15	W	February 11, 1920	7–2	Quebec Bulldogs (1919–20)	2–1–0
16	W	February 16, 1920	4–3	@ Quebec Bulldogs (1919–20)	3–1–0
17	W	February 18, 1920	8–2	@ Montreal Canadiens (1919–20)	4–1–0
18	L	February 21, 1920	3–5	Ottawa Senators (1919–20)	4–2–0
19	W	February 25, 1920	8–2	@ Quebec Bulldogs (1919–20)	5–2–0
20	L	February 28, 1920	0–1	Ottawa Senators (1919–20)	5–3–0
21	L	March 3, 1920	4–7	@ Ottawa Senators (1919–20)	5–4–0
22	W	March 6, 1920	11–2	Quebec Bulldogs (1919–20)	6–4–0
23	L	March 10, 1920	2–7	@ Montreal Canadiens (1919–20)	6–5–0
24	W	March 13, 1920	11–4	Montreal Canadiens (1919–20)	7–5–0

**Legend**: Win (2 points) Loss (0 points) Tie (1 point)

== Player statistics ==
=== Scorers ===
Player	GP	G	A	Pts	PIM
Corb Denneny	24	24	12	36	20
Reg Noble	24	24	9	33	52
Cully Wilson	23	20	6	26	86
Ken Randall	22	10	8	18	42
Babe Dye	23	11	3	14	10
Goldie Prodgers	16	8	6	14	4
Mickey Roach	21	11	2	13	4
Joe Matte	17	8	3	11	19
Harry Cameron	7	3	0	3	6
Frank Heffernan	19	0	1	1	10
Jake Forbes	5	0	0	0	0
Howie Lockhart	7	0	0	0	0
Ivan Mitchell	16	0	0	0	0

Note:

Pos = Position;GP = Games played; G = Goals; A = Assists; Pts = Points; PIM = Penalty minutes; +/- = Plus/minus; PPG = Power-play goals; SHG = Short-handed goals; GWG = Game-winning goals
Pos = Position;GP = Games played; Min, TOI = Minutes played; W = Wins; L = Losses; T,T/OT = Ties; OTL = Overtime losses; GA = Goals-against; GAA = Goals-against average; SO = Shutouts; SA = Shots against; SV = Shots saved;SV% = Save percentage;

== Transactions ==
- November 25, 1919: Rights of Dave Ritchie transferred to Quebec Bulldogs
- December 8, 1919: Signed Free Agent Frank Heffernan
- December 9, 1919: Signed Free Agent Duke Keats
- December 15, 1919: Signed Free Agents Babe Dye, Howard Lockhart and Ivan Mitchell
- January 5, 1920: Signed Free Agent Red Stuart
- February 28, 1920: Signed Free Agent Jake Forbes
