= 1919–20 Quebec Athletics season =

National Hockey League season

1919–20 Quebec Athletics
- League: 4th (1st half); 4th (2nd half) NHL
- 1919–20 record: 2–10–0 (1st half); 2–10–0 (2nd half)
- Home record: 4–8–0
- Road record: 0–12–0
- Goals for: 91
- Goals against: 177

Team information
- Coach: Mike Quinn
- Captain: Joe Malone
- Arena: Quebec Arena

Team leaders
- Goals: Joe Malone (39)
- Assists: Joe Malone (10)
- Points: Joe Malone (49)
- Penalty minutes: Harry Mummery (38)
- Wins: Frank Brophy (3)
- Goals against average: Frank Brophy (7.11)

The 1919–20 Quebec Athletics season was the Athletics' first and last season in the National Hockey League (NHL). The Quebec franchise, dating from the National Hockey Association (NHA), had been cancelled after two seasons of dormancy. This new team was created prior to the season as a replacement. The team placed fourth and last in the league in both halves of the season to not qualify for the playoffs. The Quebec franchise would be transferred to Hamilton, Ontario, before the next season.

== Off-season ==
The Quebec Bulldogs franchise had been dormant for two seasons. In the first season, long-time manager Mike Quinn had retired due to ill health and the club's directors voted to suspend the team. Before the second season, the team had been sold to Percy Quinn (no relation), but Quinn was only using the franchise in an ill-fated attempt to resurrect the National Hockey Association (NHA). The NHL owners then cancelled the Quebec NHL franchise, leaving Quebec out of the league for a second season. In May 1919, Calder and Mike Quinn made efforts to return Quebec to the league. This led to the NHL approving a new franchise in December 1919, to be operated by the Quebec Athletic Club and the club's official name in the NHL was the Quebec Athletic Club, leaving the old 'Bulldogs' nickname behind. Mike Quinn returned to manage the team for the season.

== Regular season ==
Joe Malone and Jack McDonald from the Quebec NHA team were 'returned' to the new Quebec NHL team. Malone would lead the league in scoring with 39 goals. Malone would score seven goals in a game against Toronto on January 31, 1920, and six goals in a game against Ottawa on March 10, 1920.

On March 3, the Montreal Canadiens pummeled the Athletics 16–3, setting an all-time NHL record for goals by one team.

=== Final standings ===
First half
	GP	W	L	T	Pts	GF	GA
**Ottawa Senators**	12	9	3	0	**18**	59	23
Montreal Canadiens	12	8	4	0	**16**	62	51
Toronto St. Patricks	12	5	7	0	**10**	52	62
Quebec Athletics	12	2	10	0	**4**	44	81

Second half
	GP	W	L	T	Pts	GF	GA
**Ottawa Senators**	12	10	2	0	**20**	62	41
Toronto St. Patricks	12	7	5	0	**14**	67	44
Montreal Canadiens	12	5	7	0	**10**	67	62
Quebec Athletics	12	2	10	0	**4**	47	96

Note: GP = Games Played, W = Wins, L = Losses, T = Ties, Pts = Points, GF = Goals For, GA = Goals Against
Teams that qualified for the playoffs are highlighted in bold.

=== Record vs. opponents ===
1919–20 NHL Records
Team	MTL	OTT	QUE	TOR
Montreal	—	1–7	7–1	5–3
Ottawa	7–1	—	7–1	5–3
Quebec	1–7	1–7	—	2–6
Toronto	3–5	3–5	6–2	—

== Schedule and results ==
1919–20 regular season
First half

Game	Result	Date	Score	Opponent	Record
1	L	December 24, 1919	5–12	Montreal Canadiens (1919–20)	0–1–0
2	L	December 27, 1919	4–7	@ Toronto St. Patricks (1919–20)	0–2–0
3	L	January 1, 1920	2–3	Ottawa Senators (1919–20)	0–3–0
4	W	January 7, 1920	7–5	Toronto St. Patricks (1919–20)	1–3–0
5	L	January 10, 1920	1–7	@ Ottawa Senators (1919–20)	1–4–0
6	L	January 12, 1920	3–7	@ Montreal Canadiens (1919–20)	1–5–0
7	L	January 14, 1920	1–2	Ottawa Senators (1919–20)	1–6–0
8	L	January 17, 1920	3–8	@ Toronto St. Patricks (1919–20)	1–7–0
9	L	January 21, 1920	1–12	@ Ottawa Senators (1919–20)	1–8–0
10	L	January 24, 1920	4–8	Montreal Canadiens (1919–20)	1–9–0
11	L	January 28, 1920	3–4 OT	@ Montreal Canadiens (1919–20)	1–10–0
12	W	January 31, 1920	10–6	Toronto St. Patricks (1919–20)	2–10–0

Second half

Game	Result	Date	Score	Opponent	Record
13	L	February 4, 1920	0–5	Ottawa Senators (1919–20)	2–11–0
14	L	February 7, 1920	2–6	@ Montreal Canadiens (1919–20)	2–12–0
15	L	February 11, 1920	2–7	@ Toronto St. Patricks (1919–20)	2–13–0
16	L	February 16, 1920	3–4	Toronto St. Patricks (1919–20)	2–14–0
17	L	February 18, 1920	3–9	@ Ottawa Senators (1919–20)	2–15–0
18	W	February 21, 1920	8–7 OT	Montreal Canadiens (1919–20)	3–15–0
19	L	February 25, 1920	2–8	Toronto St. Patricks (1919–20)	3–16–0
20	L	February 28, 1920	6–8	@ Montreal Canadiens (1919–20)	3–17–0
21	L	March 3, 1920	3–16	Montreal Canadiens (1919–20)	3–18–0
22	L	March 6, 1920	2–11	@ Toronto St. Patricks (1919–20)	3–19–0
23	L	March 8, 1920	6–11	@ Ottawa Senators (1919–20)	3–20–0
24	W	March 10, 1920	10–4	Ottawa Senators (1919–20)	4–20–0

Legend: Win (2 points) Loss (0 points) Tie (1 point)

== Player statistics ==
Regular season
Scoring

Player	Pos	GP	G	A	Pts	PIM
Joe Malone	C/LW	24	39	10	49	12
George Carey	RW	20	11	9	20	6
Tommy McCarthy	RW	12	12	6	18	0
Harry Mummery	D	24	9	9	18	42
Jack McDonald	C	24	6	7	13	4
Eddie Carpenter	D	24	8	4	12	24
Dave Ritchie	D	23	6	3	9	18
Tommy Smith	C	10	0	1	1	11
Frank Brophy	G	21	0	0	0	0
Jack Coughlin	F	9	0	0	0	0
Howie Lockhart	G	1	0	0	0	0
Jack Marks	F	1	0	0	0	4
Fred McLean	F	7	0	0	0	2
George McNaughton	F	1	0	0	0	0
Alex Wellington	D	1	0	0	0	0

Goaltending

Player	MIN	GP	W	L	T	GA	GAA	SO
Frank Brophy	1454	21	3	18	0	148	7.11	0
Harry Mummery	142	3	1	1	0	18	7.61	0
Howie Lockhart	60	1	0	1	0	11	11.00	0
Team:	1451	24	4	20	0	177	7.32	0

== Awards and records ==
- Joe Malone - NHL scoring champion

== Transactions ==
- Howie Lockhart - Loaned to Quebec by Toronto, March 6, 1920. (Toronto 11, Quebec 2).

== See also ==
- 1919–20 NHL season
