= List of NHL records (individual) =

This is a list of individual records recognized by the National Hockey League (NHL) through the end of the 2025–26 NHL season.

== Seasons ==
- Most seasons: Gordie Howe (1946–47 to 1970–71; 1979–80) and Chris Chelios (1983–84 to 2009–10, except for the 2004–05 NHL lockout), 26
- Most playoff seasons: Chris Chelios (1983–84 to 2009–10, except for 1997–98 and the 2004–05 NHL lockout), 24
- Most consecutive playoff seasons: Larry Robinson (1972–73 to 1991–92) and Nicklas Lidstrom (1991–92 to 2011–12, except for the 2004–05 NHL lockout), 20

== Games ==
- Most games: Patrick Marleau, 1,779
- Most games, including playoffs: Mark Messier, 1,992
- Most playoff games: Chris Chelios, 266
- Most games played in a single season, not including playoffs: Jimmy Carson (1992–93) and Bob Kudelski (1993–94), 86 (both being traded mid-season, allowing them to play more than the then-team maximum of 84 games in a season)
- Most consecutive games: Phil Kessel (November 3, 2009–April 13, 2023), 1064
- Most games played without playing in the playoffs (retired): Guy Charron, 734
- Most games played before playing in a playoff game: Jeff Skinner, 1078
- Most games coached in the Stanley Cup Final: Dick Irvin, (Note: Chicago (5), Toronto (29), and Montreal (43)) 77
- Most games played in the Stanley Cup Final: Red Kelly (Note: Detroit (37) and Toronto (28)) and Henri Richard, (Note: Montreal (65)) 65
- Most games won by a coach in the Stanley Cup Final: Scotty Bowman, (Note: Montreal (20), Pittsburgh (4), and Detroit (12)) 36
- Most games coached by the first coach of an expansion franchise: Barry Trotz (Nashville Predators), 1,196

== Stanley Cup ==
- Most Stanley Cup wins as a player: Henri Richard, (Note: Montreal Canadiens: 1956, 1957, 1958, 1959, 1960, 1965, 1966, 1968, 1969, 1971, 1973) 11
- Most Stanley Cup wins as a non-player: Scotty Bowman, (Note: Montreal: 1973, 1976, 1977, 1978, 1979 (Coach); Pittsburgh: 1991 (Director of Player Development-Recruitment), 1992 (Head Coach); Detroit: 1997, 1998, 2002 (Head Coach), 2008 (Consultant); Chicago: 2010, 2013, 2015 (Senior Advisor)) 14
- Most Stanley Cup wins, combined player or non-player: Jean Beliveau, (Note: Montreal: 1956, 1957, 1958, 1959, 1960, 1965, 1966, 1968, 1969, 1971 (Player); 1973, 1976, 1977, 1978, 1979, 1986, 1993 (Senior Vice President)) 17
- Most different teams with Stanley Cup victory:
  - Combined player/non-player: Al Arbour, (Note: Player: Detroit 1954, Chicago 1961, Toronto 1962, 1964; Coach: New York Islanders 1980, 1981, 1982, 1983) 4
  - Non-player: Tommy Gorman (Note: Ottawa Senators: 1920, 1921, 1923 (Manager); Chicago: 1934 (Manager/Coach); Montreal Maroons: 1935 (Manager/Coach); Montreal Canadiens: 1944, 1946 (Manager)) and Scotty Bowman, (Note: Montreal: 1973, 1976, 1977, 1978, 1979 (Coach); Pittsburgh: 1991 (Director of Player Development-Recruitment), 1992 (Head Coach); Detroit: 1997, 1998, 2002 (Head Coach), 2008 (Consultant); Chicago: 2010, 2013, 2015 (Senior Advisor)) 4

== NHL Awards ==
- Most Hart Memorial Trophies: Wayne Gretzky, 9
  - Most consecutive Hart Memorial Trophies: Wayne Gretzky, 8
- Most Ted Lindsay Awards: Wayne Gretzky, 5
  - Most consecutive Ted Lindsay Awards: Wayne Gretzky, 4
- Most Conn Smythe Trophies: Patrick Roy, 3
  - Most consecutive Conn Smythe Trophies: Bernie Parent, Mario Lemieux, and Sidney Crosby, 2
- Most James Norris Trophies: Bobby Orr, 8
  - Most consecutive James Norris Trophies: Bobby Orr, 8
- Most Maurice "Rocket" Richard Trophies: Alexander Ovechkin, 9
  - Most consecutive Maurice "Rocket" Richard Trophies: Alexander Ovechkin, 4
- Most Art Ross Trophies: Wayne Gretzky, 10
  - Most consecutive Art Ross Trophies: Wayne Gretzky, 7
- Most Frank J. Selke Trophies: Patrice Bergeron, 6
  - Most consecutive Frank J. Selke Trophies: Bob Gainey, 4
- Most Lady Byng Trophies: Frank Boucher, 7
  - Most consecutive Lady Byng Trophies: Frank Boucher and Pavel Datsyuk, 4
- Most William M. Jennings Trophies: Patrick Roy and Martin Brodeur, 5
  - Most consecutive William M. Jennings Trophies: Patrick Roy and Brian Hayward, 3
- Most Vezina Trophies: Jacques Plante, 7
  - Most consecutive Vezina Trophies: Jacques Plante, 5
- Most Jack Adams Awards: Pat Burns, 3
  - Most consecutive Jack Adams Awards: Jacques Demers, 2

== Goals ==
- Most career goals (regular season): Alexander Ovechkin, 929
- Most career goals (playoffs): Wayne Gretzky, 122
- Most career goals (total): Wayne Gretzky, 1,016
- Most goals, single season: Wayne Gretzky (1981–82), 92
- Most goals, in single playoffs season: Reggie Leach (1976) and Jari Kurri (1985), 19
- Most goals, single season including playoffs: Wayne Gretzky (1983–84), 100
- Most goals, single playoff series: Jari Kurri (six-game series) (1985), 12
- Most goals in a Stanley Cup Final series: Babe Dye (1922, five games), 9
- Most goals in the Stanley Cup Final, career: Maurice Richard, 34
- Most goals, 50 games from start of season: Wayne Gretzky (1981–82 and 1983–84), 61
- Fastest 50 goals from start of season: Wayne Gretzky (December 30, 1981), 39 games
- Most goals, one regular season game: Joe Malone (January 31, 1920), 7
- Most goals, one regular season home game: Joe Malone (January 31, 1920), 7
- Most goals, one regular season road game: Red Berenson (November 7, 1968), 6
- Most goals, one playoff game: Newsy Lalonde (March 1, 1919), Maurice Richard (March 23, 1944), Darryl Sittler (April 22, 1976), Reggie Leach (May 6, 1976), and Mario Lemieux (April 25, 1989), 5
- Most goals, one home playoff game: Maurice Richard (March 23, 1944), Darryl Sittler (April 22, 1976), Reggie Leach (May 6, 1976), and Mario Lemieux (April 25, 1989), 5
- Most goals, one period: Busher Jackson (November 20, 1934), Max Bentley (January 28, 1943), Clint Smith (March 4, 1945), Red Berenson (November 7, 1968), Wayne Gretzky (February 18, 1981), Grant Mulvey (February 3, 1982), Bryan Trottier (February 13, 1982), Tim Kerr (April 13, 1985), Al Secord (January 7, 1987), Joe Nieuwendyk (January 11, 1989), Peter Bondra (February 5, 1994), Mario Lemieux (January 26, 1997), Patrick Marleau (January 23, 2017), and Tage Thompson (December 7, 2022), 4
- Most goals, one playoff period: Tim Kerr (April 13, 1985) and Mario Lemieux (April 25, 1989), 4
- Most goals in one period during the Stanley Cup Final: Busher Jackson (April 5, 1932), Ted Lindsay (April 5, 1955), Maurice Richard (April 6, 1957), Wayne Gretzky (May 25, 1985), Dirk Graham (June 1, 1992), and Peter Forsberg (June 6, 1996), 3
- Most goals in different ways: Mario Lemieux (December 31, 1988) full strength, powerplay, shorthanded, penalty shot and empty net, 5
- Most consecutive game-winning goals: Newsy Lalonde (February 12, 1921 – February 26, 1921), 5
- Most game-winning goals in a single season: Phil Esposito (1970–71 and 1971–72) and Michel Goulet (1983–84), 16
- Most game-winning goals in a single playoffs season: Brad Richards (2004), 7
- Most game-winning goals in a playoff series: Mike Bossy (six-game series) (1983), 4
- Most career game-winning goals: Alexander Ovechkin, 141
- Most career game-winning goals (playoffs): Wayne Gretzky and Brett Hull, 24

== Assists ==
- Most assists regular season career: Wayne Gretzky, 1,963
- Most assists playoffs career: Wayne Gretzky 260
- Most assists career, including playoffs: Wayne Gretzky, 2,223
- Most assists, one season: Wayne Gretzky (1985–86), 163
- Most assists, one playoff season: Connor McDavid (2024), 34
- Most assists, one season, including playoffs: Wayne Gretzky (1985–86), 174
- Most assists, playoff series: Leon Draisaitl (five-game series) (2022), 15
- Most assists, one game: Billy Taylor (March 16, 1947) and Wayne Gretzky (February 15, 1980, December 11, 1985, and February 14, 1986), 7
- Most assists, one home game: Wayne Gretzky (February 15, 1980, and February 14, 1986), 7
- Most assists, one road game: Billy Taylor (March 16, 1947) and Wayne Gretzky (December 11, 1985), 7
- Most assists, one playoff game: Mikko Leinonen (April 8, 1982), and Wayne Gretzky (April 9, 1987), 6
- Most assists, one playoff home game: Mikko Leinonen (April 8, 1982), and Wayne Gretzky (April 9, 1987), 6
- Most assists, one period: Dale Hawerchuk (March 6, 1984), Kris Letang (December 27, 2023) 5

== Points ==
- Most points regular season career: Wayne Gretzky, 2,857
- Most points playoff career: Wayne Gretzky, 382
- Most points career, including playoffs: Wayne Gretzky, 3,239
- Most points, one season: Wayne Gretzky (1985–86), 215
- Fastest 100 points from the start of a season: Wayne Gretzky (December 27, 1981), 34 games
- Most points, one season, including playoffs: Wayne Gretzky (1984–85), 255
- Most points, one playoff season: Wayne Gretzky (1985), 47
- Most points, one game: Darryl Sittler (February 7, 1976), 10
- Most points, one home game: Darryl Sittler (February 7, 1976), 10
- Most points, one road game: Peter Stastny and Anton Stastny, (February 22, 1981), 8
- Most points, one playoff game: Patrik Sundstrom (April 22, 1988) and Mario Lemieux (April 25, 1989), 8
- Most points, one playoff home game: Patrik Sundstrom (April 22, 1988) and Mario Lemieux (April 25, 1989), 8
- Most points, one period: Bryan Trottier (December 23, 1978) and Mika Zibanejad (March 17, 2021), 6
- Most points, one playoff series: Rick Middleton (seven-game series) (1983), 19
- Most points, team's first postseason: Reilly Smith (2018), 22
- Most points in the Final, one series: Wayne Gretzky (1988), 13
- Most points in the Final, career: Jean Beliveau, 62

== Plus/minus ==
- Best ± rating, regular season career: Larry Robinson, +722
- Best ± rating one season: Bobby Orr (1970–71), +124
- Best ± rating one game: Tom Bladon (December 11, 1977, 11–1 game against the Cleveland Barons), +10
- Worst ± rating, season: Bill Mikkelson (1974–75), -82
- Worst ± rating, regular season game: Greg Joly (March 15, 1977), -9
- Worst ± rating, regular season career: Bob Stewart, -257
- Best ± rating playoffs career: Jari Kurri, +101
- Best ± rating one playoff season: Wayne Gretzky (1984–85), +27
- Best ± rating, playoff game: Pat Stapleton and Bill White (April 25, 1971), and Brad Park (April 20, 1983), +7
- Worst ± rating playoffs career: Tomas Sandstrom, -45
- Worst ± rating one playoff season: Paul Reinhart (1982–83), Matt Duchene and Wyatt Johnston (2024–25), -16

== Power-play goals ==
- Most power-play goals, career: Alexander Ovechkin, 325
- Most power-play goals, one season: Tim Kerr (1985–86), 34
- Most power-play goals, one season for a defenseman: Sheldon Souray (2006–07), 19
- Most power-play goals, career playoffs: Brett Hull, 38
- Most power-play goals, one playoff season: Mike Bossy, (1981), and Cam Neely, (1991), 9
- Most power-play goals, one playoff series: Chris Kontos (seven-game series), (1989), 6
- Most power-play goals, one playoff game: Syd Howe (March 23, 1939), Sid Smith (April 10, 1949), Phil Esposito (April 2, 1969), Johnny Bucyk (April 2, 1969), Denis Potvin (April 17, 1981), Tim Kerr (April 13, 1985), Jari Kurri (April 3, 1987), Mark Johnson (April 22, 1988), Dino Ciccarelli (April 29, 1993, May 11, 1995) and Valeri Kamensky (April 24, 1997), Jonathan Toews (May 7, 2010), 3
- Most power-play goals, one playoff game period: Tim Kerr (April 13, 1985), 3
- Most power-play goals, rookie Joe Nieuwendyk (1987–88) 31

== Shorthanded goals ==
- Most shorthanded goals, career: Wayne Gretzky, 73
- Most shorthanded goals, career playoffs: Mark Messier, 14
- Most shorthanded goals, one season: Mario Lemieux (1988–89), 13
- Most shorthanded goals, one playoff season: Derek Sanderson (1969), Bill Barber (1980), Lorne Henning (1980), Wayne Gretzky (1983), Wayne Presley (1989), Todd Marchant (1997), and Tobias Rieder (2020) 3
- Most shorthanded goals, one playoff series: Bill Barber (five-game series) (1980) and Wayne Presley (six-game series) (1989), 3
- Most shorthanded goals, one game: Theoren Fleury (March 9, 1991), 3
- Most shorthanded goals, rookie: Jordan Staal (2006–07), 7
- Most two-man shorthanded goals, career: Mike Richards, 3

== Overtime ==
- Most overtime goals, season: Leon Draisaitl (2024–25), 6
- Most overtime goals, career: Alexander Ovechkin, 27
- Most overtime assists, career: Evgeni Malkin and Patrick Kane, 27
- Most overtime points, career: Sidney Crosby, 44
- Most overtime goals, one playoff series: Mel Hill, 3
- Most overtime goals, one playoff year: Leon Draisaitl, 4
- Most overtime goals, playoff career: Joe Sakic, 8
- Most overtime assists, one playoff series: Bill Cowley, 3
- Most overtime assists, one playoff year: Sam Bennett, Jarome Iginla, and Adam Oates, 4
- Most overtime assists, playoff career: Adam Oates, 8
- Most overtime points, one playoff series: Bill Cowley, Ray Ferraro, Mel Hill, and Petr Klima, 3
- Most overtime points, one playoff year: Sam Bennett, Ray Ferraro, Jarome Iginla, Adam Oates, and Matthew Tkachuk, 4
- Most overtime points, playoff career: Joe Sakic, 14
- Most overtime goals by a rookie, season: Shayne Gostisbehere, 4
- Most consecutive overtime goals: Andrew Cogliano (2007–08) and Nathan Horton (2010–11), 3

== Goals/assists/points by position ==
- Most goals by a centre, career: Wayne Gretzky, 894
- Most goals by a centre, one season: Wayne Gretzky (1981–82), 92
- Most assists by a centre, career: Wayne Gretzky, 1,963
- Most assists by a centre, one season: Wayne Gretzky (1985–86), 163
- Most points by a centre, career: Wayne Gretzky, 2,857
- Most points by a centre, one season: Wayne Gretzky (1985–86), 215
- Most goals by a left wing, career: Alexander Ovechkin, 929
- Most goals by a left wing, one season: Alexander Ovechkin (2007–08), 65
- Most assists by a left wing, career: John Bucyk, 813
- Most assists by a left wing, one season: Jonathan Huberdeau (2021–22), 85
- Most points by a left wing, career: Alexander Ovechkin, 1,687
- Most points by a left wing, one season: Luc Robitaille (1992–93), 125
- Most goals by a right wing, career: Gordie Howe, 801
- Most goals by a right wing, one season: Brett Hull (1990–91), 86
- Most assists by a right wing, career: Jaromir Jagr, 1,155
- Most assists by a right wing, one season: Nikita Kucherov (2023–24), 100
- Most points by a right wing, career: Jaromir Jagr, 1,921
- Most points by a right wing, one season: Jaromir Jagr (1995–96), 149
- Most goals by a defenseman, career: Ray Bourque, 410
- Most goals by a defenseman, one season: Paul Coffey (1985–86), 48
- Most goals by a defenseman, one game: Ian Turnbull (February 2, 1977), 5
- Most assists by a defenseman, career: Ray Bourque, 1,169
- Most assists by a defenseman, one season: Bobby Orr (1970–71), 102
- Most assists by a defenseman, one game: Babe Pratt (January 8, 1944), Pat Stapleton (March 30, 1969), Bobby Orr (January 1, 1973), Ron Stackhouse (March 8, 1975), Paul Coffey (March 14, 1986), Gary Suter (April 4, 1986), and Kris Letang (December 27, 2023), 6
- Most points by a defenseman, career: Ray Bourque, 1,579
- Most points by a defenseman, one season: Bobby Orr (1970–71), 139
- Most points by a defenseman, one game: Tom Bladon (December 11, 1977) and Paul Coffey (March 14, 1986), 8
- Most points by a defenseman, one playoff year: Paul Coffey (1985), 37
- Most goals by a goaltender regular season career: Martin Brodeur (February 15, 2000 & March 21, 2013), 2
- Most goals by a goaltender in the playoffs: Ron Hextall (April 11, 1989) and Martin Brodeur (April 17, 1997), 1
- Most goals by a goaltender career, including playoffs: Martin Brodeur, 3
- Most assists by a goaltender, one season: Grant Fuhr, (1983–84) 14
- Most assists by a goaltender, regular season career: Tom Barrasso, 48
- Most assists by a goaltender playoffs one season Martin Brodeur (2011–12), 4
- Most assists by a goaltender, playoffs career: Grant Fuhr, 14
- Most assists by a goaltender, career, including playoffs: Grant Fuhr (46 regular season, 14 playoffs), 60
- Most assists by a goaltender, one game Jeff Reese (February 10, 1993), 3
- Most points by a goaltender, one season: Grant Fuhr (1983–84), 14 — all assists
- Most points by a goaltender regular season career: Tom Barrasso, 48 — all assists
- Most points by a goaltender career, including playoffs Grant Fuhr (46 regular season, 14 playoffs), 60
- Most points by a goaltender regular season one game: Jeff Reese (February 10, 1993), 3 — all assists
- Most points by a goaltender playoffs one season Martin Brodeur (2011–12), 4 — all assists
- Most points by a goaltender, one period: Jeff Reese (February 10, 1993), 3 — all assists

== Records by first NHL season ==
This is a list of players who are not rookies, but are playing in their first NHL season via expansion or through the birth of the NHL.

- Most goals by a player, first NHL season, one game: Joe Malone (December 19, 1917, January 12, 1918, and February 2, 1918) and Harry Hyland (December 19, 1917), 5
- Most goals by a player, first NHL game: Joe Malone and Harry Hyland (December 19, 1917), 5
- Most assists by a player, first NHL season, one game: Wayne Gretzky (February 15, 1980), 7
- Longest goal-scoring streak, first NHL season: Joe Malone (1917–18), 14 games
- Most assists by a player, first NHL Season Wayne Gretzky (1979–80), 86
- Most points by a player, first NHL Season Wayne Gretzky (1979–80), 137

== Records by a rookie ==
- Most goals by a rookie, one season: Teemu Selanne (1992–93), 76
- Most goals by a rookie, first game: Auston Matthews (October 12, 2016), 4
- Most goals by a rookie, one game: Howie Meeker (January 8, 1947) and Don Murdoch (October 12, 1976), 5
- Most assists by a rookie, one season: Peter Stastny (1980–81) and Joe Juneau (1992–93), 70
- Most assists by a rookie, first game: Dutch Reibel (October 8, 1953), 4
- Most points by a rookie, one season: Teemu Selanne (1992–93), 132
- Most points by a rookie, first game: Al Hill (February 14, 1977), 5
- Most points by a rookie, one game: Peter Stastny and Anton Stastny (February 22, 1981), 8
- Most goals by a rookie, one playoff season: Dino Ciccarelli (1981), 14
- Most assists by a rookie, one playoff season: Marian Stastny and Ville Leino (2010), 14
- Most points by a rookie, one playoff season: Dino Ciccarelli (1981), Ville Leino (2010), and Jake Guentzel (2017), 21
- Most points by a rookie, first playoff game: Dominik Kubalik (August 1, 2020), 5
- Most goals by a rookie defenseman, one season: Brian Leetch (1988–89), 23
- Most assists by a rookie defenseman, one season: Larry Murphy (1980–81), 60
- Most points by a rookie defenseman, one season: Larry Murphy (1980–81), 76
- Longest point streak by a rookie, one season: Paul Stastny (February 3, 2007 – March 17, 2007), 20 games
- Longest point streak by an eighteen-year-old rookie: Nathan MacKinnon (January 10, 2014 – March 6, 2014), 13 games
- Longest point streak by a rookie defenseman: Shayne Gostisbehere (January 19, 2016 – February 20, 2016), 15 games

== Points/goals/assists per game average ==
- Highest goals-per-game average, career (among players with 200-or-more goals): Mike Bossy, .762
- Highest goals-per-game average including playoffs, career (among players with 200-or-more goals): Mario Lemieux, .749
- Highest goals-per-game average, one season (among players with 20-or-more goals): Joe Malone (1917–18), 2.20
- Highest goals-per-game average, one season (among players with 50-or-more goals): Wayne Gretzky (1983–84), 1.18
- Highest assists-per-game average, career (among players with 300-or-more assists): Wayne Gretzky, 1.320
- Highest assists-per-game average, one season (among players with 35-or-more assists): Wayne Gretzky (1985–86), 2.04
- Highest points-per-game average, career (among players with 500-or-more points): Wayne Gretzky, 1.921
- Highest points-per-game average, one season (among players with 50-or-more-points): Wayne Gretzky (1983–84), 2.77

== Milestone goal seasons ==
- Most 20-or-more goal seasons: Gordie Howe, 22
- Most consecutive 20-or-more goal seasons: Gordie Howe (1949–1971), 22
- Most 30-or-more goal seasons: Alexander Ovechkin, 20
- Most consecutive 30-or-more goal seasons: Mike Gartner (1979–1994) Jaromir Jagr (1991–2007) and Alexander Ovechkin (2005–2020), 15
- Most 40-or-more goal seasons: Alexander Ovechkin, 14
- Most consecutive 40-or-more goal seasons: Wayne Gretzky (1979–1991), 12
- Most 50-or-more goal seasons: Mike Bossy, Wayne Gretzky, and Alexander Ovechkin 9
- Most consecutive 50-or-more goal seasons: Mike Bossy (1977–1986), 9
- Most 60-or-more goal seasons: Mike Bossy and Wayne Gretzky, 5
- Most consecutive 60-or-more goal seasons: Wayne Gretzky (1981–1984), 4
- Most 70-or-more goal seasons: Wayne Gretzky, 4
- Most consecutive 70-or more goal seasons: Wayne Gretzky (1981–1984), 4
- Most 80-or-more goal seasons: Wayne Gretzky, 2
- Most 90-or-more goal seasons: Wayne Gretzky, 1

== Hat trick or better games ==
- Most three-or-more goal games, career: Wayne Gretzky, 50
- Most three-or-more goal games, playoffs career: Wayne Gretzky, 10
- Most three-or-more goal games, one season: Wayne Gretzky (1981–82 and 1983–84), 10
- Most three-or-more goal games, one playoffs season: Jari Kurri (1985), 4
- Most three-or-more goal games, one playoff series: Jari Kurri (1985), 3
- Most four-or-more goal games, one season: Joe Malone (1917–18), 5
- Most five-or-more goal games, one season: Joe Malone (1917–18), 3

== Goal/assist/point streaks ==
- Longest consecutive goal-scoring streak from start of NHL career: Joe Malone (1917–18), 14 games
- Longest consecutive goal-scoring streak: Punch Broadbent, 16 games (1921–22)
- Longest consecutive goal-scoring streak, one playoff season: Reggie Leach 10 games (1976)
- Longest consecutive goal-scoring streak by a defenseman: Mike Green (2008–09), 8 games
- Longest consecutive assist-scoring streak: Wayne Gretzky (1990–91), 23 games
- Longest consecutive point-scoring streak: Wayne Gretzky (1983–84), 51 games
- Longest consecutive point-scoring streak, one playoff season: Bryan Trottier (1981), 18 games
- Longest consecutive point-scoring streak, multiple playoff seasons: Bryan Trottier (1980, 1981, 1982), 27 games
- Longest consecutive point-scoring streak from start of season: Wayne Gretzky (1983–84), 51 games
- Longest consecutive point-scoring streak by a defenseman from start of season: John-Michael Liles (2010–11), 9 games
- Longest consecutive point-scoring streak by a defenseman: Paul Coffey (1985–86), 28 games
- Longest consecutive point-scoring streak by a rookie forward: Paul Stastny (2006–07), 20 games
- Longest consecutive point-scoring streak by a rookie defenseman: Shayne Gostisbehere (2015–16), 15 games
- Longest consecutive point-scoring streak by a teenager: Patrik Laine (2017–18), 15 games

== Fastest goals ==
- Fastest goal from start of game: Merlyn Phillips (December 29, 1926), Doug Smail (December 20, 1981), Bryan Trottier (March 22, 1984), and Alexander Mogilny (December 21, 1991), 5 seconds
- Fastest goal from start of game, playoffs: Don Kozak (April 17, 1977), 6 seconds
- Fastest goal from start of period: Claude Provost (November 9, 1957), Denis Savard (January 12, 1986), James van Riemsdyk (March 28, 2014), and Brandon Montour (March 12, 2025), 4 seconds
- Fastest goal from start of period, playoffs: Don Kozak (April 17, 1977), and Pelle Eklund (April 25, 1989), 6 seconds
- Fastest goal by a player in his first game: Gus Bodnar (October 30, 1943), 15 seconds
- Fastest two goals from start of game: Mike Knuble (February 14, 2003), 27 seconds
- Fastest two goals from start of game, playoffs: Dick Duff (April 9, 1963), 68 seconds
- Fastest two goals from start of period, playoffs: Pat LaFontaine (May 19, 1984), 35 seconds
- Fastest two goals: Nels Stewart (January 3, 1931) and Deron Quint (December 15, 1995), 4 seconds
- Fastest two goals, playoffs: Joe Malone (February 22, 1919), and Norm Ullman (April 11, 1965), 5 seconds
- Fastest three goals: Bill Mosienko (March 23, 1952), 21 seconds
- Fastest three assists: Gus Bodnar (March 23, 1952), 21 seconds
- Fastest regular season overtime goal: Brandon Montour (March 12, 2025), 4 seconds
- Fastest playoff overtime goal: Brian Skrudland (May 18, 1986), 9 seconds
- Fastest goal after being scored on: Doug Gilmour (December 19, 1987), and Mikael Granlund (January 5, 2016), 2 seconds

== Shots ==
- Most shots on goal, career: Alexander Ovechkin, 6,864
- Most shots on goal, playoffs career: Ray Bourque, 812
- Most shots on goal, one season: Phil Esposito (1970–71), 550
- Most shots on goal, one playoff season: Henrik Zetterberg (2008), 116
- Most shots on goal, one game: Ray Bourque (March 21, 1991), 19
- Most shots on goal, one playoff game: Daniel Briere (April 22, 2006), 14
- Most shots on goal, one period: Evander Kane (November 1, 2018), 10

== Hits ==
- Most hits, one regular season game: Gary Roberts (March 10, 1999) and Zdeno Chara (November 3, 1999) 17
- Most hits, one playoff game: Brenden Morrow (May 4, 2008), 19
- Most hits, one season: Kiefer Sherwood (2024–25), 462
- Most hits, one playoff season: Blake Coleman (2020), 126
- Most hits, regular season career: Cal Clutterbuck, 4,029
- Most hits, playoff career: Alexander Ovechkin, 629

== Blocked shots ==
- Most blocked shots, one game: Kris Russell (March 5, 2015), 15
- Most blocked shots, one playoff game: Anton Volchenkov (May 12, 2007 and March 22, 2010) and David Savard (August 11, 2020), 11
- Most blocked shots, one season: Kris Russell (2014–15), 283
- Most blocked shots, one playoff season: Anton Volchenkov (2007), 80
- Most blocked shots, career: Marc-Edouard Vlasic, 2,184
- Most blocked shots, playoffs career: Ryan McDonagh, 430

== Time on ice ==
- Most time on ice per game by a defenseman, one season: Ryan Suter (2013–14), 29:25
- Most time on ice per game by a forward, one season : Pavel Bure (1998–99), 25:16
- Most time on ice per game by a defenseman, playoff season (minimum 10 games): Chris Pronger, 35:52
- Most time on ice per game by a forward, playoff season (minimum 10 games): Alexei Kovalev, 26:35
- Most time on ice by a defenseman, one regular season game: Cam Fowler (April 8, 2023), 38:54
- Most time on ice by a forward, one regular season game: Mikko Rantanen (January 8, 2024), 30:23
- Most time on ice by a defenseman, one playoff game: Seth Jones (August 11, 2020), 65:06
- Most time on ice by a forward, one playoff game: Jaromir Jagr (May 4, 2000), 59:08

== Penalty shots ==
- Most penalty shot goals, career: Pavel Bure and Brad Marchand, 7
- Most penalty shot goals, playoffs career: Michael Frolik, 2
- Most penalty shot goals, one season: Pavel Bure, (1997–98) 3
- Most penalty shot attempts, career: Vincent Lecavalier and Alexander Ovechkin, 13
- Most penalty shot attempts, playoffs career: Mats Sundin and Michael Frolik, 2
- Most penalty shot attempts, one season: Ebbie Goodfellow, (1934–35) 6
- Most penalty shot attempts, one game: Mud Bruneteau (November 24, 1938), Erik Cole (November 9, 2005), Max Pacioretty (February 6, 2009), and Auston Matthews (November 3, 2017), 2
- Most penalty shots faced by a goaltender, career: Roberto Luongo, 33
- Most penalty shots faced by a goaltender, playoffs career: Dominik Hasek, 5
- Most penalty shots faced by a goaltender, one season: George Hainsworth, (1934–35) 8
- Most penalty shots faced by a goaltender, one game: Miikka Kiprusoff (March 4, 2011), Roberto Luongo (February 6, 2014), Ben Bishop (October 8, 2015), and Jonathan Quick (November 3, 2017), 2
- Most penalty shots stopped by a goaltender, career: Roberto Luongo, 29
- Most penalty shots stopped by a goaltender, playoffs career: Dominik Hasek, 4
- Most penalty shots stopped by a goaltender, one season: George Hainsworth, (1934–35) 8
- Most penalty shots allowed by a goaltender, career: Tomas Vokoun, 8
- Most penalty shots allowed by a goaltender, one season: Henrik Lundqvist, (2013–14) 4

== Penalties ==
- Most penalties, one game: Chris Nilan (March 31, 1991), 10
- Most penalties, one playoff game: Forbes Kennedy (April 2, 1969), Kim Clackson (April 20, 1980), and Dale Hunter (April 22, 1988), 8
- Most penalties, one period: Randy Holt (March 11, 1979), 9
- Most penalty minutes, career: Tiger Williams, 3,966
- Most penalty minutes, playoffs career: Dale Hunter, 729
- Most penalty minutes, career, including playoffs: Tiger Williams, 4,421
- Most penalty minutes, one season: Dave Schultz (1974–75), 472
- Most penalty minutes, one playoffs season: Chris Nilan (1986), 141
- Most penalty minutes, one game: Randy Holt (March 11, 1979), 67
- Most penalty minutes, one playoff game: Billy Coutu (March 7, 1923), Dave Schultz (April 22, 1976), and Deryk Engelland (April 17, 2015), 42
- Most penalty minutes, one period: Randy Holt (March 11, 1979), 67
- Most penalty minutes, one playoff period: Billy Coutu (March 7, 1923) and Deryk Engelland (April 17, 2015), 42
- Most penalty minutes, career, in the Stanley Cup Final: Gordie Howe, 94

== Goaltending ==
- Most wins by a goaltender regular season career: Martin Brodeur, 691
- Most wins by a goaltender playoffs career: Patrick Roy, 151
- Most wins by a goaltender career, including playoffs: Martin Brodeur 804
- Best winning percentage (minimum 250 played): Ken Dryden .740 in 397 games played
- Best winning percentage (minimum 500 games played): Jacques Plante .610 in 837 games played
- Most wins by a goaltender, one season: Martin Brodeur (2006–07) and Braden Holtby (2015–16), 48
- Most wins by a goaltender, career, in the Final: Jacques Plante, 25
- Most wins by a goaltender, expansion team season: Marc-Andre Fleury (2017–18 Vegas Golden Knights), 28
- Most wins by a rookie goaltender, single playoffs season: Jordan Binnington (2018–19 St. Louis Blues), 16
- Most ties, career: Terry Sawchuk, 172
- Most losses by a goaltender regular season career: Martin Brodeur, 397
- Most losses by a goaltender playoffs career: Patrick Roy, 94
- Most losses by a goaltender, one season: Gary Smith (1970–71), 48
- Most losses by a goaltender, one playoff season: Ron Hextall (1987), Miikka Kiprusoff (2004), Henrik Lundqvist (2014), Ben Bishop (2015), 11
- Most shutouts regular season career: Martin Brodeur 125
- Most shutouts playoffs career: Martin Brodeur 24
- Most shutouts by a goaltender, including playoffs, expansion team season: Marc-Andre Fleury (2017–18 Vegas Golden Knights), 9
- Most shutouts, including playoffs career: Martin Brodeur 149
- Most shutouts, one regular season: George Hainsworth (1928–29), 22
- Most shutouts, one playoff season: Martin Brodeur (2002–03), 7
- Most games appeared in by a goaltender, career regular season: Martin Brodeur, 1,265
- Most games appeared in by a goaltender, career playoffs: Patrick Roy, 247
- Most games appeared in by a goaltender career, including playoffs Martin Brodeur, 1,470
- Most games appeared in by a goaltender career, in the Final: Jacques Plante (Montreal-38), St. Louis-3), 41
- Most consecutive complete games by a goaltender: Glenn Hall, 502 (1955–1962)
- Most consecutive appearances in a single season by a goaltender – Grant Fuhr 76 in 1996
- Most games appeared in by a goaltender, one regular season: Grant Fuhr, 79 (1995–96)
- Most games appeared in by a goaltender, one playoff season Ron Hextall (1986–87), Jonathan Quick (2013–14) and Jordan Binnington (2018–19), 26
- Most minutes played by a goaltender, career: Martin Brodeur, 74,380
- Most minutes played by a goaltender, one season: Martin Brodeur (2006–07), 4,697
- Least time played by a goaltender, career Jorge Alves Dec 31, 2016, 7.6 sec
- Longest continuous shutout by a goaltender: Alec Connell (7 games, 2 periods) (1927–28), 461 minutes, 29 seconds
- Longest continuous shutout by a goaltender at start of career: Matt Hackett (December 6 & 8, 2011), 102 minutes, 48 seconds
- Longest winning streak by a goaltender, one season: Gilles Gilbert (1975–76), 17 games
- Longest winning streak to start a season: Jack Campbell (2020–21), 11 games
- Longest undefeated streak by a goaltender, one season: Gerry Cheevers (24 wins, 8 ties 1971–72), 32 games
- Longest undefeated streak by a rookie goaltender, first season: Grant Fuhr (15 wins, 8 ties 1981–82), 23 games
- Longest undefeated streak by a goaltender from start of career: Patrick Lalime (14 wins, 2 ties 1996–97), 16 games
- Most 20-or-more win seasons by a goaltender Patrick Roy, 17
- Most consecutive 20-or-more win seasons by a goaltender: Henrik Lundqvist (2005–2018), 13
- Most consecutive 20-or-more win seasons by a goaltender to start a career: Henrik Lundqvist (2005–2018) 13
- Most 30-or-more win seasons by a goaltender: Martin Brodeur and Patrick Roy, 14
- Most consecutive 30-or-more win seasons by a goaltender: Martin Brodeur (1995–2008), 12
- Most consecutive 30-or-more win seasons by a goaltender to start a career: Henrik Lundqvist (2005–2012), 7
- Most 40-or-more win seasons by a goaltender: Martin Brodeur 8
- Most consecutive 40-or-more win seasons by a goaltender: Martin Brodeur (2005–2008) and Evgeni Nabokov (2007–10), 3
- Most consecutive wins by a goaltender in his rookie season: Ross Brooks (1973–74), 12
- Most consecutive wins by a goaltender in his first season: George Hainsworth (1926–27), 11
- Most losses by a goaltender regular season career: Martin Brodeur, 397
- Most losses by a goaltender, one season: Gary Smith (1970–71), 48
- Most home games played by a goaltender, one season: Roberto Luongo (2006–07), 41
- Most shots faced by a goaltender, in a regular season game: Sam LoPresti (March 4, 1941), 83
- Most shots faced by a goaltender, in a season: Roberto Luongo (2005–06), 2,488
- Most shots faced by a goaltender, in a playoff game: Normie Smith (March 24, 1936), 92
- Most saves by a goaltender career: Martin Brodeur, 28,928
- Most saves by a goaltender playoffs career: Patrick Roy, 6,561
- Most saves by a goaltender, including playoffs career: Martin Brodeur, 33,758
- Most saves by a goaltender, in a regular season game: Sam LoPresti (March 4, 1941), 80
- Most saves by a goaltender, in a playoff game: Normie Smith (March 24, 1936), 92
- Most saves by a goaltender, in a playoffs overtime game shutout: Normie Smith (March 24, 1936), 92
- Most saves by a goaltender, in a regular season shutout: Ben Scrivens (January 29, 2014), 59
- Most saves by a goaltender, in a season: Roberto Luongo (2003–04), 2,303
- Most saves by a goaltender, in a playoff run: Tim Thomas (2011), 798
- Most saves by a goaltender, in a Stanley Cup Final series: Tim Thomas (2011), 238
- Most saves by a goaltender, in a playoff game shutout that did not go to overtime: Thatcher Demko (2020), 48
- Highest save percentage, in a regular season (minimum 30 starts): Jacques Plante (1970–71), .944
- Highest save percentage, playoffs (minimum 10 starts): Jonathan Quick (2012), .946
- Most goals-against, one regular season game: Frank Brophy (March 3, 1920), 16
- Most goals-against, one playoff game: Paul Bibeault (March 20, 1944), 11
- Fewest goals-against, regular season (minimum 30 games): Alec Connell (1925–26), 42
- Most goals-against, regular season (minimum 30 games): Ken McAuley (1943–44), 310
- Fewest goals-against, playoffs (minimum 10 games): Jacques Plante (1969), 14
- Most goal-against, playoffs (minimum 10 games): Kelly Hrudey (1993), 74
- Lowest goals-against average, regular season (minimum 20 games): George Hainsworth, 0.92
- Lowest goals-against average, playoffs (minimum 10 games): Frank Brimsek, 1.25
- Highest goals-against average, regular season (minimum 20 games): Frank Brophy, 7.11
- Highest goals-against average, playoffs (minimum 10 games): Murray Bannerman, 4.77
- Most overtime wins: Roberto Luongo, 49
- Most penalty minutes by a goaltender regular season career: Ron Hextall, 584
- Most penalty minutes by a goaltender playoffs career: Ron Hextall, 115
- Most penalty minutes by a goaltender career, including playoffs: Ron Hextall (584 regular season, 115 playoffs), 699
- Most penalty minutes by a goaltender one season Ron Hextall (1988–89), 113
- Most penalty minutes by a goaltender one playoff season Ron Hextall (1986–87), 43
- Youngest goaltender to win 50 regular-season games: Patrick Roy 22 yrs
- Youngest goaltender to win 100 regular-season games: Patrick Roy 23 yrs
- Youngest goaltender to win 200 regular-season games: Martin Brodeur 26 yrs., 1 mos
- Youngest goaltender to win 300 regular-season games: Martin Brodeur 29 yrs., 7 mos.
- Youngest goaltender to win 400 regular-season games: Martin Brodeur 31 yrs., 10 mos.
- Youngest goaltender to win 500 regular-season games: Martin Brodeur 35 yrs., 6 mos.
- Youngest goaltender to win 600 regular-season games: Martin Brodeur 37 yrs., 11 mos.
- Quickest goaltender to win 400 regular-season games: Henrik Lundqvist 727
- Most Stanley Cup Final series played by a goaltender: Jacques Plante (Montreal: 8 (1953, 54, 55, 56, 57, 58, 59, 60); St. Louis: 2 (1969, 70)), 10
- Most consecutive Stanley Cup Final series played by a goaltender: Jacques Plante (Montreal (1953, 54, 55, 56, 57, 58, 59, 60), 8
- Fewest saves required in a win: Ryan Miller (Anaheim Jan. 25, 2018) 11:40 min; Antti Niemi (Dallas Dec. 12, 2015) 6:43 min; Richard Bachman (Dallas Mar. 29, 2013) 2:32 min; Craig Billington (Colorado Dec. 21, 1998) 1:52 min, (Colorado Dec. 31, 1996) 0:12 sec; Steve Weeks (NY Rangers Mar. 24, 1982) 0:17 sec 0

== Shootout ==
- Most shootout goals in one season: Ilya Kovalchuk (2011–12), 11
- Most game-deciding shootout goals in one season: Ilya Kovalchuk (2011–12), 7
- Most shootout goals career: Patrick Kane, 53
- Most game-deciding shootout goals career: Frans Nielsen and Patrick Kane, 23
- Highest shootout percentage (Minimum 15 attempts): Trevor Zegras, 61.9% (13/21)
- Most shootout attempts in a season: Radim Vrbata, 18
- Most shootout attempts career: Patrick Kane, 132
- Most shootout games played by a goaltender in a season: Martin Brodeur (2006–07), 16
- Most shootout games played by a goaltender career: Henrik Lundqvist, 111
- Most shootout wins by a goaltender in a season: Ryan Miller and Martin Brodeur (2006–07), Mathieu Garon (2007–08), and Jonathan Quick (2010–11), 10
- Most shootout wins by a goaltender career: Marc-Andre Fleury, 66
- Most shootout losses by a goaltender in a season: Tomas Vokoun (2009–10) and Tuukka Rask (2014–15), 9
- Most shootout losses by a goaltender career: Roberto Luongo, 58
- Most goals allowed in a shootout by a goaltender career: Roberto Luongo, 133
- Most saves in a shootout by a goaltender career: Henrik Lundqvist, 293

== Age ==
- Oldest forward: Gordie Howe, April 11, 1980, 52 years, 11 days
- Oldest defenceman: Chris Chelios, April 6, 2010, 48 years, 71 days
- Oldest goaltender: Maurice Roberts, November 25, 1951, 45 years, 345 days
- Oldest player to play his first game: Connie Madigan, February 6, 1973, 38 years, 94 days
- Oldest goaltender to play his first game: David Ayres, February 22, 2020, 42 years 194 days
- Oldest goaltender to win his regular-season debut: David Ayres, February 22, 2020, 42 years, 194 days
- Youngest player to play his first game: Bep Guidolin, November 12, 1942, 16 years, 337 days
- Youngest goaltender to play his first game: Harry Lumley, December 23, 1943, 17 years, 42 days
- Oldest goaltender to play in Stanley Cup Final: Lester Patrick, April 7, 1928, 44 years, 90 days
- Oldest defenceman to play in the Stanley Cup Final: Doug Harvey, May 11, 1968, 43 years, 137 days
- Oldest forward to play in Stanley Cup Final: Mark Recchi, June 15, 2011, 43 years, 134 days
- Youngest player to play in the Stanley Cup Final: Gaye Stewart, April 14, 1942, 18 years, 290 days
- Youngest player to win the Stanley Cup: Larry Hillman, April 14, 1955 18 years, 68 days (played 2 games in semifinals, did not play in the Final)
- Oldest player to win the Stanley Cup: Chris Chelios, June 4, 2008, 46 years, 130 days (did not play in 2008 Final, so Doug Harvey keeps record for oldest defenceman to play in Final)
- Oldest goaltender to win the Stanley Cup: Lester Patrick April 14, 1928, 44 years, 90 days

== See also ==
- List of NHL records (team)
- List of NHL statistical leaders
- List of NHL statistical leaders by country

== Sources ==
- NHL Official Guide and Record Book, 2024
- www.nhl.com
