= 1919–20 Ottawa Senators season =

National Hockey League team season

1919–20 Ottawa Senators
- Stanley Cup champions
- 1919–20 record: 9–3–0 (1st half); 10–2–0 (2nd half)
- Home record: 12–1–0
- Road record: 7–4–0
- Goals for: 121
- Goals against: 64

Team information
- General manager: Tommy Gorman
- Coach: Pete Green
- Captain: Eddie Gerard
- Arena: The Arena

Team leaders
- Goals: Frank Nighbor (26)
- Assists: Frank Nighbor (7)
- Points: Frank Nighbor (33)
- Penalty minutes: Sprague Cleghorn (62)
- Wins: Clint Benedict (19)
- Goals against average: Clint Benedict (2.66)

The 1919–20 Ottawa Senators season was the club's 35th season of play and third season in the NHL. It was a very successful season, as they set an NHL record for wins (19), points (38), and won both halves of the season, therefore the Sens automatically were awarded the NHL championship and the right to play in the Stanley Cup Final. The Senators defeated Seattle to win their eighth Stanley Cup title.

== Regular season ==
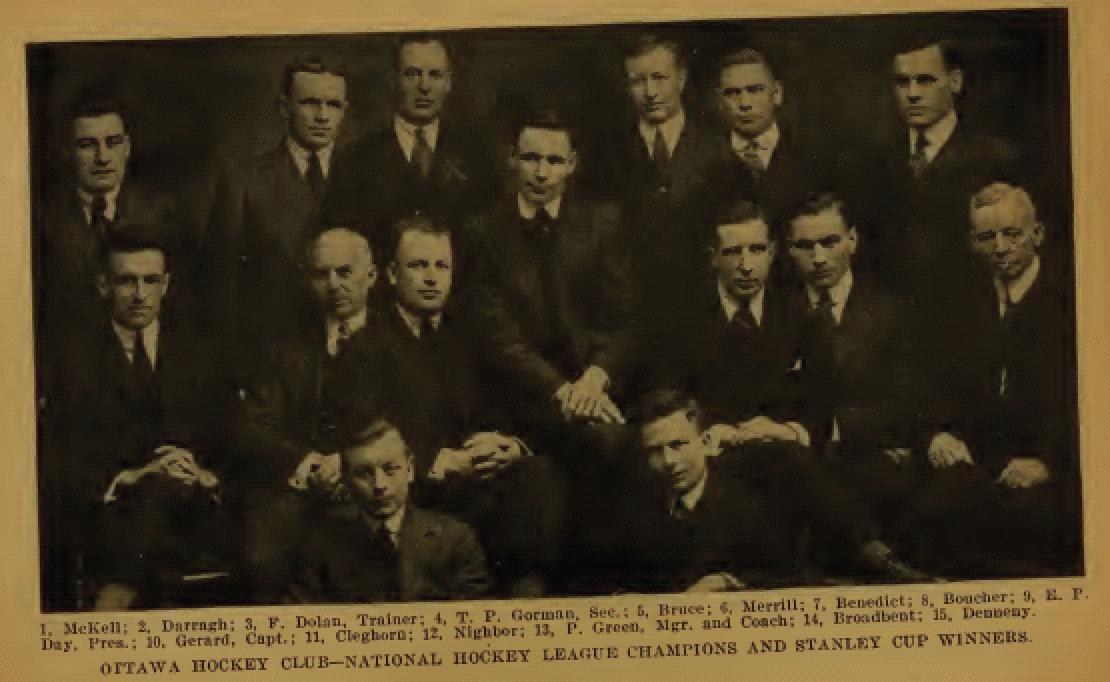
Team picture as published in 1921 Ice Hockey Guide

The Quebec Bulldogs team was relaunched as the Quebec Athletics and added to the league and the schedule changed from 18 games to 24. Also, the Toronto Arenas would get new ownership and be renamed the Toronto St. Patricks.

Frank Nighbor led the Sens offensively with 26 goals, good for third in the NHL, and his 33 points ranked him fourth. Clint Benedict set an NHL record with five shutouts, and he led the league in both wins (19) and GAA (2.66).

=== December ===
- **December 23** – The Senators opened the 1919–20 season on home ice against the newly renamed Toronto St. Patricks. Frank Nighbor, Punch Broadbent and Jack Darragh each scored a goal while Clint Benedict recorded the shutout in a 3–0 Senators victory.
- **December 27** - Ottawa played their first road game of the season at Mount Royal Arena against the Montreal Canadiens. Sprague Cleghorn led the team offensively with a goal and an assist and Clint Benedict recorded his second straight shutout as the Senators defeated the Canadiens 2–0.

Ottawa finished December with a 2–0–0 record, earning four points. The Senators were in first place in the NHL, as second place Toronto also had four points, however, they had played more games by the end of December.

=== January ===
- **January 1** – The Senators opened the 1920's on the road in Quebec City for their first ever game against the Quebec Athletics at Quebec Arena. Jack Darragh, Nighbor and Cy Denneny each scored a goal as the Senators extended their winning streak to three games as they beat the Athletics 3–2.
- **January 3** - Ottawa made their first visit to Mutual Street Arena in Toronto for a meeting against the Toronto St. Patricks. Darragh and Nighbor each scored a goal and an assist, however, the Senators saw their three game winning streak snapped with a 4–3 loss to Toronto.
- **January 7** - The Senators returned home for a matchup against the Montreal Canadiens. Broadbent scored three goals and an assist, all in the first period, as Ottawa held on for a 4–3 win over Montreal.
- **January 10** - The Quebec Athletics made their first ever visit to Ottawa. After a scoreless first period, the Senators scored three in the second period, followed by four in the third in a 7–1 win over Quebec. Darragh scored three goals in the win.
- **January 14** - The Senators were on the road to Quebec City for the second game of a home-and-home series against the Athletics. Cleghorn and Nighbor each scored for the Senators, while Benedict was very solid in a 2–1 victory.
- **January 17** - Ottawa continued their road trip with a game against the Montreal Canadiens. Broadbent scored both of the Senators goals, however, Amos Arbour scored the winning goal for the Canadiens late in the third period as the Senators lost the game 3–2.
- **January 21** - The Senators returned home for a matchup against the Quebec Athletics. Both Cleghorn and Nighbor scored three goals and an assist, while Broadbent and Darragh each scored twice, as the Senators demolished the Athletics 12–1.
- **January 24** - Ottawa was back on the road with a game in Toronto against their provincial rivals, the Toronto St. Patricks. Cleghorn led the Senators offensively with a goal and an assist, however, Cully Wilson scored twice for the St. Patricks as the Senators lost the game 5–3.
- **January 28** - The Senators returned home for the second game of a home-and-home series against the Toronto St. Patricks. Ottawa was led by Broadbent, who scored two goals and two assists, while Benedict stopped every shot he faced, as the Senators shutout Toronto 7–0.
- **January 31** - The Montreal Canadiens came into Ottawa for the final game of the first half of the season. Both clubs had identical 8–3–0 records and the winning team would earn a berth in the NHL championship. Broadbent scored three goals, Nighbor scored two goals and four assists, and Darragh scored twice and earned three assists as the Senators humiliated the Canadiens by a score of 11–3 and clinched first place in the first half of the season.

=== February ===
- **February 4** – The Senators opened the second half of the season on the road against the Quebec Athletics. Cleghorn scored twice while Benedict earned the shutout as the Senators defeated the Athletics 5–0.
- **February 7** - Ottawa returned home for their first home game of the second half of the season against the Toronto St. Patricks. Nighbor scored twice and earned an assist, however, it wasn't enough as the Senators lost the game 4–3.
- **February 11** - The Montreal Canadiens visited Ottawa for the first time in the second half of the season. Darragh scored his second and tie-breaking goal of the game late in the third period, as the Senators defeated the Canadiens 4–3.
- **February 14** - The Senators travelled to Montreal to complete a home-and-home series with the Montreal Canadiens. Cleghorn and Nighbor each scored as the game was tied 2–2 heading into overtime. In the extra period, Denneny scored 1:30 into the extra period, as the Senators defeated the Canadiens 3–2.
- **February 18** - The Senators returned home to face a struggling Quebec Athletics club. Denneny scored three goals and an assist, while Cleghorn and Darragh each scored twice as the Senators easily defeated Quebec 9–3.
- **February 21** - Ottawa was back on the road for a game against the Toronto St. Patricks. Cleghorn and Darragh each scored twice to lead the Senators to a 5–3 win over the St. Patricks.
- **February 25** - Back on home ice, the Senators faced the Canadiens. Darragh scored twice and added two assists, while Nighbor had a goal and two assists as Ottawa defeated the Canadiens 6–3.
- **February 28** - Ottawa closed out the month of February back on the road in Toronto for a matchup against the Toronto St. Patricks. Frank Nighbor scored a shorthanded goal, while Clint Benedict earned the shutout, as the Senators defeated the St. Patricks 1–0.

The Senators finished February with a 7–1–0 record, earning 14 points, and sitting in first place in the second half standings.

=== March ===
- **March 3** – Ottawa returned home for the second game of a home-and-home series against the Toronto St. Patricks. Cy Denneny and Eddie Gerard each scored two goals and Nighbor scored a goal and two assists as the Senators extended their winning streak to seven games with a 7–4 victory.
- **March 6** - The Senators visited the Montreal Canadiens for the final time of the season. Nighbor scored three goals, including the overtime winner, as Ottawa defeated Montreal 4–3 to extend their winning streak to eight games.
- **March 8** - Ottawa was back at home for a game against the Quebec Athletics. The Athletics held a 5–4 lead in the third period, however, the Senators scored seven goals in the final 11:30 of the game to defeat Quebec 11–6. Gerard had three goals and two assists, Nighbor scored three goals and an assist, while Denneny also scored three goals to lead the Senators. With the win, the club extended their winning streak to nine games and clinched first place for the second half of the season.
- **March 10** - The Senators travelled to Quebec for their final game of the regular season against the Quebec Athletics. As the Senators had clinched first place, they rested some players in the season finale. The Athletics took advantage and snapped the Senators nine game winning streak with a 10–4 victory. Quebec's Joe Malone scored six goals.

Overall, Ottawa had a record of 3–1–0 in March. The Senators won the second half of the NHL season as they posted a league best 10–2–0 record, earning 20 points.

=== Final standings ===
First half
	GP	W	L	T	Pts	GF	GA
**Ottawa Senators**	12	9	3	0	**18**	59	23
Montreal Canadiens	12	8	4	0	**16**	62	51
Toronto St. Patricks	12	5	7	0	**10**	52	62
Quebec Athletics	12	2	10	0	**4**	44	81

Second half
	GP	W	L	T	Pts	GF	GA
**Ottawa Senators**	12	10	2	0	**20**	62	41
Toronto St. Patricks	12	7	5	0	**14**	67	44
Montreal Canadiens	12	5	7	0	**10**	67	62
Quebec Athletics	12	2	10	0	**4**	47	96

Note: GP = Games Played, W = Wins, L = Losses, T = Ties, Pts = Points, GF = Goals For, GA = Goals Against
Teams that qualified for the playoffs are highlighted in bold.

=== Record vs. opponents ===
1919–20 NHL Records
Team	MTL	OTT	QUE	TOR
Montreal	—	1–7	7–1	5–3
Ottawa	7–1	—	7–1	5–3
Quebec	1–7	1–7	—	2–6
Toronto	3–5	3–5	6–2	—

== Playoffs ==
Ottawa won both halves of the schedule, and no NHL playoffs were played.

=== Stanley Cup Final ===
Ottawa Senators 3, Seattle Metropolitans 2

The Senators faced the Seattle Metropolitans for the Stanley Cup, with all games scheduled to be played in Ottawa. However an unseasonably warm spring in the Ottawa area led to some problems with the ice at Dey's Arena, and the final two games were moved to Toronto's Arena Gardens, which had artificial ice equipment.

- Game one - The series opened on March 22 in Ottawa. The Metropolitans Frank Foyston scored the lone goal of the first period, giving Seattle a 1–0 lead over the Senators. Foyston scored his second goal of the game 5:46 into the second period, as Seattle went up 2–0. Frank Nighbor finally got Ottawa on the scoreboard with a goal 14:15 into the second period, cutting the Metropolitans lead to 2–1. In the third period, Nighbor scored his second goal of the game 10:00 into the period, tying the game 2–2. The Senators' Jack Darragh scored with 4:00 remaining in the game, as Ottawa held on to a 3–2 win and a 1–0 series lead.
- Game two - The second game was played in Ottawa on March 24. The Senators' Darragh scored the only goal of the first period, as Ottawa took a 1–0 into the first intermission. Neither team scored in the second period, as this was a very tightly defensive game. In the third period, Eddie Gerard scored 6:00 into the period, giving Ottawa a 2–0 lead. Nighbor scored a late goal, as the Senators shutout the Metropolitans 3–0 and took a commanding 2–0 series lead.
- Game three - The third game was played on March 27 in Ottawa, as the Senators could close out the series and win the Stanley Cup with a victory. The Senators Georges Boucher got Ottawa on the board first with a goal 5:00 into the game. The Metropolitans' Foyston replied with his third goal of the series three minutes later, tying the game 1–1 after the first period. In the second period, Foyston scored once again, as Seattle took a 2–1 lead into the third period. The Metropolitans Roy Rickey scored the only goal of the third period, as the Senators couldn't beat Hap Holmes. Seattle won the game 3–1 and cut the Senators series lead to 2–1.
- Game four - The fourth game was moved to Arena Gardens in Toronto due to ice problems in Ottawa on March 30. The Metropolitans used this to their advantage, as they took a 2–0 lead after the first period. Nighbor brought the Senators to within a goal as he scored 2:00 into the second period, however, the Metropolitans responded with a goal six minutes later, taking a 3–1 lead in the game. Ottawa once again brought the game to within a goal by the end of the period, as Nighbor scored his second of the game, making it 3–2 Seattle after two periods. In the third period, the Metropolitans scored two goals, including the sixth of the series by Frank Foyston, as they won the game 5–2 and tied the series up at 2–2.
- Game five - The fifth and deciding game was played in Toronto on April 1. The Metropolitans Bobby Rowe gave Seattle an early 1–0 lead with a goal 10:00 into the first period, however, the Senators Boucher tied the game four minutes later, making it 1–1 after the first period. The teams skated to a scoreless second period, as the game remained tied heading into the third period. Ottawa's Darragh broke the tie with a goal 5:00 into the period, giving Ottawa a 2–1 lead. At the 10:00 mark of the period, the Senators took a 3–1 lead after a goal by Gerard. Darragh then scored two goals within a minute, giving the Senators a 5–1 lead. Nighbor closed out the scoring with a goal 30 seconds after Darragh's second goal, as Ottawa crushed the Metropolitans 6–1 to clinch the Stanley Cup for the first time since the club joined the NHL.

== Schedule and results ==
=== Regular season ===
1919–20 regular season
First half: 9–3–0 (home: 6–0–0; road: 3–3–0)

Game	Date	Visitor	Score	Home	OT	Decision	Attendance	Arena	Record	Pts	Recap
1	December 23	Toronto	0–3	Ottawa		Benedict	N/A	The Arena	1–0–0	2	
2	December 27	Ottawa	2–0	Montreal		Benedict	N/A	Mount Royal Arena	2–0–0	4	
3	January 1	Ottawa	3–2	Quebec		Benedict	N/A	Quebec Arena	3–0–0	6	
4	January 3	Ottawa	3–4	Toronto		Benedict	N/A	Arena Gardens	3–1–0	6	
5	January 7	Montreal	2–3	Ottawa		Benedict	N/A	The Arena	4–1–0	8	
6	January 10	Quebec	1–7	Ottawa		Benedict	N/A	The Arena	5–1–0	10	
7	January 14	Ottawa	2–1	Quebec		Benedict	N/A	Quebec Arena	6–1–0	12	
8	January 17	Ottawa	2–3	Montreal		Benedict	N/A	Mount Royal Arena	6–2–0	12	
9	January 21	Quebec	1–12	Ottawa		Benedict	N/A	The Arena	7–2–0	14	
10	January 24	Ottawa	3–5	Toronto		Benedict	N/A	Arena Gardens	7–3–0	14	
11	January 28	Toronto	0–7	Ottawa		Benedict	N/A	The Arena	8–3–0	16	
12	January 31	Montreal	3–11	Ottawa		Benedict	N/A	The Arena	9–3–0	18	

Second half: 10–2–0 (home: 5–1–0; road: 5–1–0)

Game	Date	Visitor	Score	Home	OT	Decision	Attendance	Arena	Record	Pts	Recap
1	February 4	Ottawa	5–0	Quebec		Benedict	N/A	Quebec Arena	1–0–0	2	
2	February 7	Toronto	4–3	Ottawa		Benedict	N/A	The Arena	1–1–0	2	
3	February 11	Montreal	3–4	Ottawa		Benedict	N/A	The Arena	2–1–0	4	
4	February 14	Ottawa	3–2	Montreal	OT	Benedict	N/A	Mount Royal Arena	3–1–0	6	
5	February 18	Quebec	3–9	Ottawa		Benedict	N/A	The Arena	4–1–0	8	
6	February 21	Ottawa	5–3	Toronto		Benedict	N/A	Arena Gardens	5–1–0	10	
7	February 25	Montreal	3–6	Ottawa		Benedict	N/A	The Arena	6–1–0	12	
8	February 28	Ottawa	1–0	Toronto		Benedict	N/A	Arena Gardens	7–1–0	14	
9	March 4	Toronto	4–7	Ottawa		Benedict	N/A	The Arena	8–1–0	16	
10	March 6	Ottawa	4–3	Montreal	OT	Benedict	N/A	Mount Royal Arena	9–1–0	18	
11	March 8	Quebec	6–11	Ottawa		Benedict	N/A	The Arena	10–1–0	20	
12	March 10	Ottawa	4–10	Quebec		Benedict	N/A	Quebec Arena	10–2–0	20	

Legend: Win (2 points) Loss (0 points) Tie (1 point)

=== Playoffs ===
1920 Stanley Cup playoffs
Stanley Cup Final vs. Seattle Metropolitans – Senators win 3–2

Game	Date	Visitor	Score	Home	OT	Decision	Attendance	Arena	Series
1	March 22	Seattle	2–3	Ottawa		Benedict	N/A	The Arena	1–0
2	March 24	Seattle	0–3	Ottawa		Benedict	N/A	The Arena	2–0
3	March 27	Seattle	3–1	Ottawa		Benedict	N/A	The Arena	2–1
4	March 30	Ottawa	2–5	Seattle		Benedict	N/A	Arena Gardens	2–2
5	April 1	Ottawa	6–1	Seattle		Benedict	N/A	Arena Gardens	3–2

Legend: Win Loss Tie

== Player statistics ==
=== Scoring leaders ===
Player	GP	G	A	Pts	PIM
Frank Nighbor	23	26	7	33	18
Jack Darragh	22	22	5	27	22
Punch Broadbent	20	19	4	23	39
Sprague Cleghorn	21	16	5	21	62
Cy Denneny	22	16	2	18	21

=== Goaltending ===
Player	GP	MinI	W	L	T	GA	SO	GAA
Jack Darragh	1	2	0	0	0	0	0	0.00
Clint Benedict	24	1443	19	5	0	64	5	2.66

Note:

Pos = Position;GP = Games played; G = Goals; A = Assists; Pts = Points; PIM = Penalty minutes; +/- = Plus/minus; PPG = Power-play goals; SHG = Short-handed goals; GWG = Game-winning goals
Pos = Position;GP = Games played; Min, TOI = Minutes played; W = Wins; L = Losses; T,T/OT = Ties; OTL = Overtime losses; GA = Goals-against; GAA = Goals-against average; SO = Shutouts; SA = Shots against; SV = Shots saved;SV% = Save percentage;

== Awards and records ==
- NHL champion (O'Brien Cup not awarded)

== Transactions ==
The Senators were involved in the following transactions during the 1919–20 season.

=== Trades ===
November 25, 1919	To Ottawa Senators Rusty Crawford	To Quebec Athletics Tommy Smith

=== Free agents ===
November 29, 1919	Did not play in 1918–19 Horace Merrill
December 19, 1919	From Ottawa Munitions (OCHL) Jack Mackell

== See also ==
- 1919–20 NHL season
- List of Stanley Cup champions
