= Tommy McCarthy (ice hockey) =

Former Canadian ice hockey player

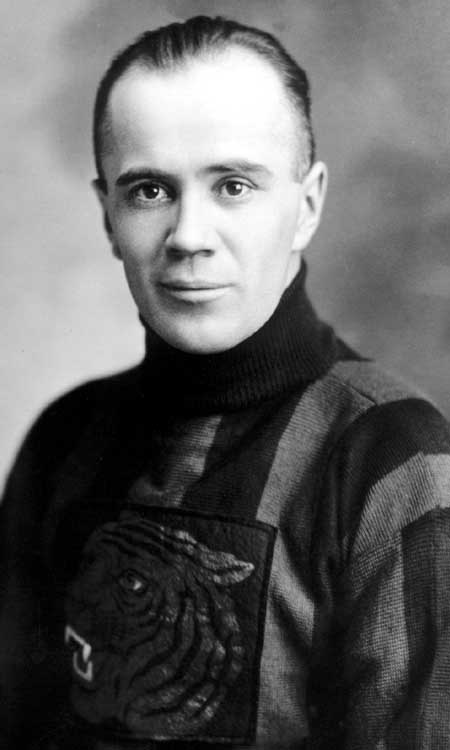
- Born: April 12, 1893 St. Peter's, Nova Scotia, Canada
- Died: December 28, 1959 (aged 66) Sacramento, California, United States
- Height: 5 ft 11 in (180 cm)
- Weight: 165 lb (75 kg; 11 st 11 lb)
- Position: Right wing
- Shot: Right
- Played for: Quebec Bulldogs; Hamilton Tigers
- Playing career: 1914–1923

Thomas Edward McCarthy (April 12, 1893 – December 28, 1959) was a professional ice hockey player who played two seasons in the National Hockey League for the Quebec Bulldogs and Hamilton Tigers. After several years as an amateur player with teams in New York, McCarthy joined the amateur Hamilton Tigers in 1918–19 and helped them win the Allan Cup as the best amateur team in Canada. He turned professional in 1919 when he joined the Bulldogs and played one season with the team before they moved and became the professional Tigers. McCarthy played an additional season there before joining the Saskatoon/Moose Jaw Crescents of the Western Canada Hockey League, and played one final season with the Seattle Metropolitans of the Pacific Coast Hockey Association before retiring in 1923.

== Playing career ==
He played one season for the Quebec Bulldogs (1919–20) and one for the Hamilton Tigers (1920–21) of the NHL and one season for the Seattle Metropolitans (1922–23) of the PCHA. In 35 NHL games, he scored 22 goals and added 7 assists for 29 points. In 16 PCHA games, he scored two goals and one assist.

== Career statistics ==
=== Regular season and playoffs ===
			Regular season					Playoffs
Season	Team	League	GP	G	A	Pts	PIM	GP	G	A	Pts	PIM
1914–15	New York Irish-Americans	AAHL	8	5	0	5	—	—	—	—	—	—
1915–16	Brooklyn Crescents	AAHL	7	5	0	5	—	—	—	—	—	—
1916–17	Brooklyn Crescents	AAHL	12	14	0	14	—	—	—	—	—	—
1917–18	New York Wanderers	USNHL	10	4	0	4	—	—	—	—	—	—
1918–19	Hamilton Tigers	OHA	8	19	3	22	—	4	3	2	5	—
1918–19	Hamilton Tigers	Al-Cup	—	—	—	—	—	2	1	0	1	0
1919–20	Quebec Bulldogs	NHL	12	12	6	18	0	—	—	—	—	—
1920–21	Hamilton Tigers	NHL	23	10	1	11	10	—	—	—	—	—
1921–22	Saskatoon/Moose Jaw Crescents	WCHL	7	1	0	1	0	—	—	—	—	—
1922–23	Seattle Metropolitans	PCHA	16	2	1	3	0	—	—	—	—	—
NHL totals			35	22	7	29	10	—	—	—	—	—
