= 1919–20 Montreal Canadiens season =

NHL hockey team season

1919–20 Montreal Canadiens
- League: 2nd (1st half), 3rd (2nd half) NHL
- 1919–20 record: 8–4–0 (1st half), 5–7–0 (2nd half)
- Home record: 8–4–0
- Road record: 5–7–0
- Goals for: 129
- Goals against: 113

Team information
- General manager: George Kennedy
- Coach: Newsy Lalonde
- Captain: Newsy Lalonde
- Arena: Mount Royal Arena

Team leaders
- Goals: Newsy Lalonde (37)
- Assists: Didier Pitre (12)
- Points: Newsy Lalonde (47)
- Penalty minutes: Bert Corbeau; Billy Coutu (65)
- Wins: Georges Vezina (13)
- Goals against average: Georges Vezina (4.66)

The 1919–20 Montreal Canadiens season was the team's 11th season and third as a member of the National Hockey League (NHL). The Canadiens opened their new Mount Royal Arena built to replace burnt-down Jubilee Rink.

The Toronto NHL franchise was now operated by a new group and known as the Toronto St. Patricks. A Quebec team was active this season, meaning a four-team league operated, and players from the Quebec NHA team were 'returned' to the new Quebec Bulldogs NHL team. The Canadiens lost Joe Malone and Jack McDonald to the Bulldogs.

Harry Cameron joined the Canadiens from Ottawa and Howard McNamara re-joined the Canadiens after not playing since 1917 with the Toronto 228th Battalion, and serving in the Canadian army. Don Smith, who had last played for the Canadiens in 1914–15, returned after serving in the army, last playing for the Montreal Wanderers in 1915–16. The team and failed to make the playoffs for the first time since the 1914–15 season and the first since joining the NHL.

== Regular season ==
The Mount Royal Arena was not ready for the start of the season, and the Canadiens started their season on the road. The home opener was held January 10, and Newsy Lalonde used the occasion to celebrate with six goals in a 14–7 drubbing of the Toronto St. Patricks.

On March 3, the Montreal Canadiens pummeled the Quebec Bulldogs 16–3, setting an all-time record for goals by one team.

Georges Vezina came third in the league in goals against average of 4.66 per game. Newsy Lalonde led the Canadiens in offence, scoring 37 goals and 9 assists to place second in league scoring to Joe Malone.

The Canadiens picked up their scoring from the previous season, but gave up more goals on defence.

There was no playoffs as the Ottawa Senators won both halves of the season.

=== Final standings ===
First half
	GP	W	L	T	Pts	GF	GA
**Ottawa Senators**	12	9	3	0	**18**	59	23
Montreal Canadiens	12	8	4	0	**16**	62	51
Toronto St. Patricks	12	5	7	0	**10**	52	62
Quebec Athletics	12	2	10	0	**4**	44	81

Second half
	GP	W	L	T	Pts	GF	GA
**Ottawa Senators**	12	10	2	0	**20**	62	41
Toronto St. Patricks	12	7	5	0	**14**	67	44
Montreal Canadiens	12	5	7	0	**10**	67	62
Quebec Athletics	12	2	10	0	**4**	47	96

Note: GP = Games Played, W = Wins, L = Losses, T = Ties, Pts = Points, GF = Goals For, GA = Goals Against
Teams that qualified for the playoffs are highlighted in bold.

=== Record vs. opponents ===
1919–20 NHL Records
Team	MTL	OTT	QUE	TOR
Montreal	—	1–7	7–1	5–3
Ottawa	7–1	—	7–1	5–3
Quebec	1–7	1–7	—	2–6
Toronto	3–5	3–5	6–2	—

== Schedule and results ==
1919–20 regular season
First half

Game	Date	Opponent	Score	Record
1	December 25	at Quebec Bulldogs	12–5	1–0
2	December 27	Ottawa Senators	0–2	1–1
3	December 31	at Toronto St. Pats	1–5	1–2
4	January 7	at Ottawa Senators	3–4	1–3
5	January 10	Toronto St. Pats	14–7	2–3
6	January 12	Quebec Bulldogs	7–3	3–3
7	January 14	at Toronto St. Pats	4–3	4–3
8	January 17	Ottawa Senators	3–2	5–3
9	January 21	Toronto St. Pats	3–2	6–3
10	January 24	at Quebec Bulldogs	8–4	7–3
11	January 28	Quebec Bulldogs	4–3	8–3
12	January 31	at Ottawa Senators	3–11	8–4

Second half

Game	Date	Opponent	Score	Record
13	February 4	at Toronto St. Pats	6–5	1–0
14	February 7	Quebec Bulldogs	6–2	2–0
15	February 11	at Ottawa Senators	3–4	2–1
16	February 14	Ottawa Senators	2–3	2–2
17	February 18	Toronto St. Pats	2–8	2–3
18	February 21	at Quebec Bulldogs	7–8	2–4
19	February 25	at Ottawa Senators	3–6	2–5
20	February 28	Quebec Bulldogs	8–6	3–5
21	March 3	at Quebec Bulldogs	16–3	4–5
22	March 6	Ottawa Senators	3–4	4–6
23	March 10	Toronto St. Pats	7–2	5–6
24	March 13	at Toronto St. Pats	4–11	5–7

Legend: Win (2 points) Loss (0 points) Tie (1 point)

== Player statistics ==
=== Skaters ===
Note: GP = Games played, G = Goals, A = Assists, Pts = Points, PIM = Penalties in minutes

		Regular season					Playoffs
Player	#	GP	G	A	Pts	PIM	GP	G	A	Pts	PIM
Newsy Lalonde	4	23	37	9	46	34	-	-	-	-	-
Amos Arbour	10	22	21	5	26	13	-	-	-	-	-
Didier Pitre	5	23	14	12	26	6	-	-	-	-	-
Odie Cleghorn	6	21	20	4	24	30	-	-	-	-	-
Harry Cameron†	11	16	12	5	17	36	-	-	-	-	-
Bert Corbeau	2	24	11	6	17	65	-	-	-	-	-
Louis Berlinguette	8	24	8	9	17	36	-	-	-	-	-
Billy Coutu	9	20	4	0	4	67	-	-	-	-	-
Don Smith	7	12	1	0	1	6	-	-	-	-	-
Howard McNamara	3	12	1	0	1	6	-	-	-	-	-
Jack Coughlin†	12	3	0	0	0	0	-	-	-	-	-

†Denotes player spent time with another team before joining Montreal. Stats reflect time with the Canadiens only.

=== Goaltenders ===
Note: GP = Games played; TOI = Time on ice (minutes); W = Wins; L = Losses; T = Ties; GA = Goals against; SO = Shutouts; GAA = Goals against average

		Regular season								Playoffs
Player	#	GP	TOI	W	L	T	GA	SO	GAA	GP	TOI	W	L	T	GA	SO	GAA
Georges Vezina	1	24	1456	13	11	0	113	0	4.66	--	--	--	--	--	--	--	-.--

== Transactions ==
- transferred Joe Malone and Jack McDonald to Quebec Bulldogs when the club returned to the NHL, November 25, 1919
- signed Don Smith as a free agent, November, 1919
- signed Howard McNamara as a free agent, December 5, 1919
- signed Eddie Carpenter as a free agent, December 15, 1919
- traded Eddie Carpenter to Quebec Bulldogs for Goldie Prodgers, December 21, 1919
- traded Goldie Prodgers to Toronto St. Pats for Harry Cameron, January 14, 1920
- signed Jack Coughlin as a free agent, February 18, 1920,

- Mouton, p. 153

== See also ==
- 1919–20 NHL season
