= Ivan Mitchell =

Canadian ice hockey player

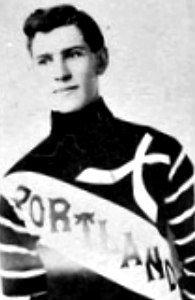
- Mitchell with the 1914–15 Portland Rosebuds
- Born: July 9, 1893 Winnipeg, Manitoba, Canada
- Died: May 8, 1942 (aged 48) Winnipeg, Manitoba, Canada
- Height: 6 ft 0 in (183 cm)
- Weight: 180 lb (82 kg; 12 st 12 lb)
- Position: Goaltender
- Caught: Left
- Played for: Portland Rosebuds; Toronto St. Patricks
- Playing career: 1914–1922

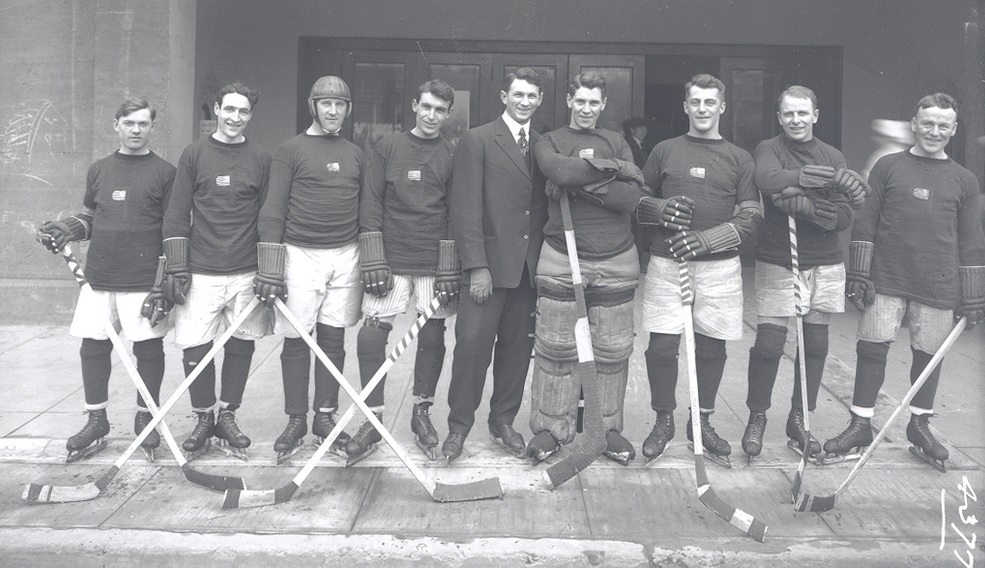
Mitchell, fourth from the right, with the 1914–15 Portland Rosebuds.

Ivan Gladstone "Mike" Mitchell (July 9, 1893 — May 8, 1942) was a Canadian professional ice hockey goaltender who played three seasons in the National Hockey League for the Toronto St. Patricks. Before playing in the NHL, Mitchell played the 1914–15 season with the Portland Rosebuds of the PCHA, and then served with the Canadian forces in World War 1.

In 1922, Mitchell was injured during the second game of the season and then missed the rest of the season due to illness. He is still credited with winning the Stanley Cup that season.

== Military duty and illness ==
Between 1915 and 1919 Mitchell was on military duty, fighting with the Canadian forces in World War 1. A notice in the Vancouver Daily World on November 19, 1917, claimed Mitchell had succumbed to his wounds in a London hospital, but the information turned out to be inaccurate as he was still alive.

Mitchell was living in Hamilton, Ontario at the onset of the 1921–22 season, but was loaned to the Toronto St. Patricks to cover for an injured John Ross Roach. Later in the season, in early February, he had become seriously ill and was confined to the General Hospital in Hamilton, suspected of suffering from a tumor of the brain, due to being gassed overseas in World War 1, and was given little hope of survival. However, later in February, Mitchell had recovered, being operated on for an abscess on the brain, and was said to be going west to convalesce.

Mitchell died on May 8, 1942, in his hometown of Winnipeg.

== Career statistics ==
=== Regular season and playoffs ===
			Regular season								Playoffs
Season	Team	League	GP	W	L	T	Min	GA	SO	GAA	GP	W	L	T	Min	GA	SO	GAA
1912–13	Phoenix Hockey Club	BCBHL	7	6	0	1	420	18	0	2.57	—	—	—	—	—	—	—	—
1913–14	Phoenix Hockey Club	BCBHL	10	4	6	0	610	32	0	3.15	—	—	—	—	—	—	—	—
1914–15	Portland Rosebuds	PCHA	18	9	9	0	1113	83	0	4.47	—	—	—	—	—	—	—	—
1915–16	Military duty		—	—	—	—	—	—	—	—	—	—	—	—	—	—	—	—
1916–17	Military duty		—	—	—	—	—	—	—	—	—	—	—	—	—	—	—	—
1917–18	Military duty		—	—	—	—	—	—	—	—	—	—	—	—	—	—	—	—
1918–19	Military duty		—	—	—	—	—	—	—	—	—	—	—	—	—	—	—	—
1919–20	Toronto St. Pats	NHL	16	6	7	0	830	60	0	4.34	—	—	—	—	—	—	—	—
1920–21	Toronto St. Pats	NHL	4	2	2	0	240	22	0	5.50	—	—	—	—	—	—	—	—
1921–22	Toronto St. Pats	NHL	2	2	0	0	120	6	0	3.00	—	—	—	—	—	—	—	—
PCHA totals			18	9	9	0	1113	83	0	4.47	—	—	—	—	—	—	—	—
NHL totals			22	10	9	0	1190	88	0	4.44	—	—	—	—	—	—	—	—
