= Frank Heffernan =

Canadian ice hockey player ad coach

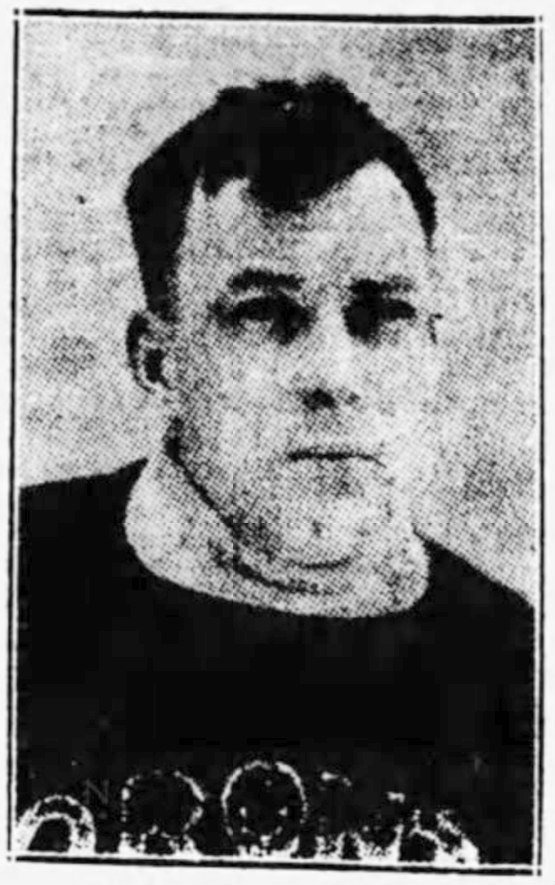
- Born: January 12, 1892; Peterborough, Ontario, Canada
- Died: December 21, 1938 (aged 46); New York City, New York, U.S.
- Height: 6 ft 0 in (183 cm)
- Weight: 209 lb (95 kg; 14 st 13 lb)
- Position: Defence
- Shot: Left
- Played for: Toronto St. Patricks
- Playing career: 1912–1920

James Francis Heffernan (January 12, 1892 – December 21, 1938) was a Canadian hockey defenceman and coach. He played several years of senior hockey for amateur clubs before spending part of the 1919–20 season with the Toronto St. Patricks of the National Hockey League. He served as player-coach for part of the season before retiring from playing.

== Playing career ==
From Peterborough, Ontario, Heffernan played junior hockey in his hometown and then played at the senior level in Toronto with the Toronto Rugby and Athletic Association (TR&AA) club (1912 to 1914) and the Toronto Victorias (1914–15). He played in the United States from 1915 to 1918 with the Brooklyn Crescents and the New York Wanderers before returning to Canada and joining the senior amateur Toronto St. Patricks in the Ontario Hockey Association.

In December 1919, a group affiliated with the St. Pats took over the Toronto franchise in the National Hockey League, renaming the team the Toronto St. Patricks with Heffernan as player-coach and co-owner. The NHL credits Heffernan with coaching 12 games, with five wins and seven losses. He was replaced as coach during the season by Harvey Sproule and sold his stake in the team in December 1920. The club would become the Toronto Maple Leafs in 1927. Heffernan was said to be joining the rival Canadian Hockey League, but it never got off the ground.

Heffernan was also a competitive football player with the TR&AA club, winning the Ontario Rugby Football Union senior championship. He died in 1938 in a New York City hotel room and is buried in St. Peter's Catholic Cemetery in his native Peterborough, Ontario.

== Career statistics ==
=== Regular season and playoffs ===
			Regular season					Playoffs
Season	Team	League	GP	G	A	Pts	PIM	GP	G	A	Pts	PIM
1910–11	Peterborough Juniors	OHA Jr	—	—	—	—	—	—	—	—	—	—
1911–12	Ottawa College	OCHL	—	—	—	—	—	—	—	—	—	—
1912–13	Toronto R&AA	OHA Sr	6	2	0	2	0	4	2	0	2	—
1913–14	Toronto R&AA	OHA Sr	6	4	0	4	—	2	0	0	0	—
1914–15	Toronto Victorias	OHA Sr	6	5	0	5	—	4	0	0	0	—
1915–16	Brooklyn Crescents	AAHL	8	7	0	7	—	—	—	—	—	—
1916–17	Springhill Miners	NSAPC	2	6	0	6	—	—	—	—	—	—
1916–17	Brooklyn Crescents	AAHL	8	3	0	3	—	–	—	—	—	—
1917–18	New York Wanderers	USNHL	4	1	0	1	—	—	—	—	—	—
1918–19	Toronto St. Patricks	OHA Sr	9	6	3	9	—	1	1	0	1	—
1919–20	Toronto St. Patricks	NHL	19	0	1	1	10	—	—	—	—	—
NHL totals			19	0	1	1	10	—	—	—	—	—

=== Coaching record ===
Team	Year	Regular Season							Post Season
Team	Year	G	W	L	T	OTL	Pts	Finish	Result
Toronto St. Patricks	1919–20	12	5	7	0	—	10	3rd in NHL	(resigned)

Preceded by Dick Carroll	Head coach of the Toronto St. Patricks; 1919-20	Succeeded by Harvey Sproule
