= 1919–20 NHL season =

Professional ice hockey league season

- League: National Hockey League
- Sport: Ice hockey
- Duration: December 23, 1919 – March 13, 1920
- Games: 24
- Teams: 4

Regular season
- Top scorer: Joe Malone (Athletics)

League
- Champions: Ottawa Senators
- Runners-up: Montreal Canadiens; Toronto St. Patricks

NHL seasons
- ← 1918–19 1920–21 →

The 1919–20 NHL season was the third season of the National Hockey League (NHL). A Quebec team was activated by the NHL, increasing the number of teams to four. Following changes in its ownership, the Toronto NHL franchise adopted the Toronto St. Patricks name. The four teams played 24 games in a split-schedule format. The Ottawa Senators won the league championship by winning both halves of the split-season. The Senators went on to win the Stanley Cup for the first time since the Cup challenge era ended and their eighth time overall, by defeating the PCHA's Seattle Metropolitans three games to two in a best-of-five series in the Stanley Cup Final.

== League business ==
The NHL approved the name change of Toronto's franchise to Tecumsehs on December 6, 1919, a previous name of a Toronto franchise in the NHA. Several days later, the franchise was transferred from the Arena to private investors, which named the club the Toronto St. Patricks. Frank Heffernan was named manager of the club.The group paid $5,000 to the NHL for the franchise.

Since the NHL had cancelled the previous Quebec franchise after Percy Quinn tried to use the franchise to resurrect the NHA, Quebec was without a franchise. By agreement with the NHL franchise's previous owners, a new Quebec franchise was approved on December 16, 1919. Quebec, which did not ice teams in the first two seasons of the NHL, finally iced a team, although they were not successful.

== Arena changes ==
- The Montreal Canadiens' home arena, Jubilee Rink, burned down during the off-season in April 1919, forcing the team to play on the road at the start of the 1919–20 season until Mount Royal Arena was completed in January 1920.
- The new Quebec Athletics team played their home games at Quebec Arena.

== Regular season ==
=== Highlights ===
The Montreal Canadiens had their home opener January 10 in brand new Mount Royal Arena and Newsy Lalonde used the occasion to celebrate with six goals in a 14–7 drubbing of the Toronto St. Patricks. The combined total of 21 goals by both teams set the NHL record.

Jack Darragh of Ottawa had a chance to play in goal when Toronto defeated Ottawa 5–3 on January 24. He took over when Clint Benedict was penalized. He did not surrender any goals during the two minutes.

Despite a dismal record of 2–10 in both halves of the season, the Quebec Athletics' Joe Malone scored seven goals in one game on January 31, 1920. As of 2020, it is still the NHL record for most goals in one game. An eighth goal was disallowed on an off-side call. Malone was later quoted "the thing I recall most vividly is that it was bitterly cold." He nearly equalled the record on March 10 when he scored six goals in a 10–4 win over the Ottawa Senators. Malone led the league in goals with 39. But by surrendering 7.18 goals against per game, a record that stands today, Quebec finished dead last.

With the war now over, players came home and fans were now coming in larger numbers to see games. On February 21, 1920, a record crowd of 8,500 fans came to see Ottawa play Toronto at the Arena Gardens.

=== Final standings ===
First half
	GP	W	L	T	Pts	GF	GA
**Ottawa Senators**	12	9	3	0	**18**	59	23
Montreal Canadiens	12	8	4	0	**16**	62	51
Toronto St. Patricks	12	5	7	0	**10**	52	62
Quebec Athletics	12	2	10	0	**4**	44	81

Second half
	GP	W	L	T	Pts	GF	GA
**Ottawa Senators**	12	10	2	0	**20**	62	41
Toronto St. Patricks	12	7	5	0	**14**	67	44
Montreal Canadiens	12	5	7	0	**10**	67	62
Quebec Athletics	12	2	10	0	**4**	47	96

Note: GP = Games Played, W = Wins, L = Losses, T = Ties, Pts = Points, GF = Goals For, GA = Goals Against
Teams that qualified for the playoffs are highlighted in bold.

== Playoffs ==
Because the Ottawa Senators won both halves of the split regular season, there was no need for an NHL playoff. The Senators were named NHL champions and given a spot in the Stanley Cup championship series. Representing the Pacific Coast Hockey Association (PCHA) was the Seattle Metropolitans, which battled in a tight PCHA, in which two wins separated its three teams. A problem arose as Seattle's green, red, and white uniforms looked similar to Ottawa's black, red, and white uniforms. The Senators agreed to play in white sweaters. The five-game series was scheduled to be played in Ottawa, but unseasonably warm weather forced the final two games to Toronto's Arena Gardens. In 1921, when the NHA's dormant O'Brien Cup was reinstated by the NHL as an award to its league playoff champions, this 1920 championship was engraved on the Cup.

=== Stanley Cup Final ===
Games one, three and five were played under NHL rules (without a rover), while games two and four were played under PCHA rules (with a rover).

March 22	Seattle Metropolitans	2–3	Ottawa Senators	Arena Gardens	Recap
Frank Foyston (1) – 10:25		First period	No scoring
Frank Foyston (2) – 06:45		Second period	14:15 – Frank Nighbor (1)
No scoring		Third period	10:00 – Frank Nighbor (2); 16:00 – Jack Darragh (1)
Hap Holmes		Goalie stats	Clint Benedict

March 24	Seattle Metropolitans	0–3	Ottawa Senators	Arena Gardens	Recap
No scoring		First period	14:00 – Jack Darragh (2)
No scoring		Second period	No scoring
No scoring		Third period	06:00 – Eddie Gerard (1); 19:00 – Frank Nighbor (3)
Hap Holmes		Goalie stats	Clint Benedict

March 27	Seattle Metropolitans	3–1	Ottawa Senators	Arena Gardens	Recap
Frank Foyston (3) – 09:00		First period	06:00 – Buck Boucher (1)
Frank Foyston (4) – 12:00		Second period	No scoring
Roy Rickey (1) – 09:30		Third period	No scoring
Hap Holmes		Goalie stats	Clint Benedict

March 30	Ottawa Senators	2–5	Seattle Metropolitans	The Arena	Recap
No scoring		First period	03:00 – Frank Foyston (5); 08:00 – Bobby Rowe (1)
Frank Nighbor (4) – 02:00; Frank Nighbor (5) – 11:00		Second period	08:00 – Jack Walker (1)
No scoring		Third period	02:00 – Roy Rickey (2); 05:00 – Frank Foyston (6)
Clint Benedict		Goalie stats	Hap Holmes

April 1	Ottawa Senators	6–1	Seattle Metropolitans	The Arena	Recap
Buck Boucher (2) – 14:00		First period	10:00 – Bobby Rowe (2)
No scoring		Second period	No scoring
Jack Darragh (3) – 05:00; Eddie Gerard (2) – 10:00; Jack Darragh (3) – 13:00; Jack Darragh (4) – 14:00; Frank Nighbor (6) – 14:30		Third period	No scoring
Clint Benedict		Goalie stats	Hap Holmes

Ottawa won series 3–2

== Awards ==
- NHL champion – Ottawa Senators

Note: The O'Brien Cup, still considered the championship of the NHA, was not awarded in 1920. It remained under the care of the Canadiens who had won it in 1917, until the death of their owner, George Kennedy in 1921, when the NHL made arrangements to re-use the trophy. The Hockey Hall of Fame lists Ottawa as the winner for 1919–20.

== Player statistics ==
=== Scoring leaders ===
GP = Games Played, G = Goals, A = Assists, Pts = Points, PIM = Penalties In Minutes

Player	Team	GP	G	A	Pts	PIM
Joe Malone	Quebec Athletics	24	39	10	49	12
Newsy Lalonde	Montreal Canadiens	23	37	9	46	34
Frank Nighbor	Ottawa Senators	23	26	15	41	18
Corbett Denneny	Toronto St. Patricks	24	24	12	36	20
Jack Darragh	Ottawa Senators	23	22	14	36	22
Reg Noble	Toronto St. Patricks	24	24	9	33	52
Amos Arbour	Montreal Canadiens	22	21	5	26	13
Cully Wilson	Toronto St. Patricks	23	20	6	26	86
Didier Pitre	Montreal Canadiens	22	14	12	26	6
Punch Broadbent	Ottawa Senators	21	19	6	25	40

Source: NHL.

=== Leading goaltenders ===
GP = Games Played, Mins = Minutes played, GA = Goals Against, SO = Shutouts, GAA = Goals Against Average

Name	Team	GP	Mins	W	L	T	GA	SO	GAA
Clint Benedict	Ottawa Senators	24	1443	19	5	0	64	5	2.66
Jake Forbes	Toronto St. Patricks	5	300	2	3	0	21	0	4.20
Ivan Mitchell	Toronto St. Patricks	16	830	6	7	0	60	0	4.34
Georges Vezina	Montreal Canadiens	24	1456	13	11	0	113	0	4.66
Howard Lockhart	Toronto, Quebec	8	370	4	3	0	36	0	5.84
Frank Brophy	Quebec Athletics	21	1249	3	18	0	148	0	7.11

Source: NHL

== Coaches ==
- Montreal Canadiens: Newsy Lalonde
- Ottawa Senators: Pete Green
- Quebec Athletics: Mike Quinn
- Toronto St. Patricks: Frank Carroll

== Milestones and records ==
- January 31 – Quebec Athletics' Joe Malone scores seven goals in one game (record for most goals in one game by a player)
- March 3 – Montreal Canadiens defeat Quebec Athletics 16–3 (record for most goals by one team)

=== Debuts ===
The following is a list of players of note who played their first NHL game in 1919–20 (listed with their first team, asterisk(*) marks debut in playoffs):

Player	Team	Notability
Babe Dye	Toronto St. Patricks	Hockey Hall of Fame (1970)

The last remaining active player to kick off their NHL career this season was Jake Forbes, who played his final NHL game in the 1932–33 season, although he missed the 1921–22 season.

=== Last games ===
The following is a list of players of note that played their last game in the NHL in 1919–20 (listed with their last team):

== See also ==
- List of Stanley Cup champions
- 1919–20 NHL transactions
- List of pre-NHL seasons
- 1919–20 PCHA season

Preceded by 1918–19 NHL season	1919–20 NHL season 1919–20	Succeeded by 1920–21 NHL season
