= Frank Brophy =

Canadian ice hockey player (1897–1930)

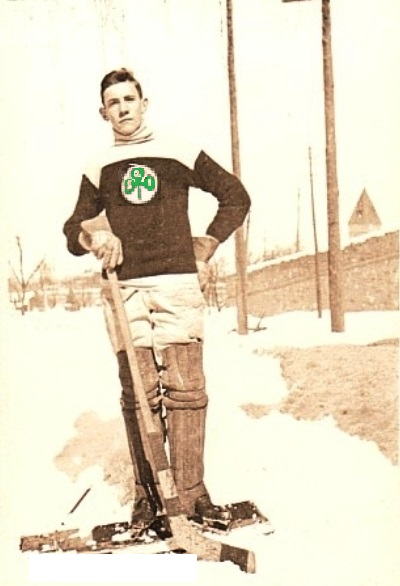
- Born: March 12, 1897 Montreal, Quebec, Canada
- Died: June 29, 1930 (aged 33) Quebec City, Quebec, Canada
- Height: 5 ft 6 in (168 cm)
- Weight: 150 lb (68 kg; 10 st 10 lb)
- Position: Goaltender
- Caught: Left
- Played for: Quebec Bulldogs
- Playing career: 1914–1921

Thomas Francis Constantine Brophy (March 12, 1897 – June 29, 1930) was a Canadian professional ice hockey goaltender who played one season in the National Hockey League with the Quebec Bulldogs, in 1919–20. He played in 21 games and allowed 148 goals. He was born in Montreal, Quebec.

== Career statistics ==
=== Regular season and playoffs ===
			Regular season								Playoffs
Season	Team	League	GP	W	L	T	Min	GA	SO	GAA	GP	W	L	T	Min	GA	SO	GAA
1914–15	Quebec Crescents	QCHL	—	—	—	—	—	—	—	—	—	—	—	—	—	—	—	—
1915–16	Quebec Crescents	QCHL	—	—	—	—	—	—	—	—	—	—	—	—	—	—	—	—
1916–17	Quebec Crescents	QCHL	5	2	3	0	300	19	0	3.80	—	—	—	—	—	—	—	—
1917–18	Montreal St. Ann's	MCHL	9	6	2	1	537	19	2	2.12	—	—	—	—	—	—	—	—
1917–18	Montreal Westmount	MCHL	—	—	—	—	—	—	—	—	—	—	—	—	—	—	—	—
1918–19	Montreal Vickers	MCHL	10	9	0	1	600	24	1	2.40	—	—	—	—	—	—	—	—
1919–20	Quebec Bulldogs	NHL	21	3	18	0	1249	148	0	7.11	—	—	—	—	—	—	—	—
1919–20	Quebec Crescents	QCHL	1	1	0	0	60	2	0	2.00	—	—	—	—	—	—	—	—
1920–21	Quebec Telegraph	QCHL	—	—	—	—	—	—	—	—	—	—	—	—	—	—	—	—
NHL totals			21	3	18	0	1249	148	0	7.11	—	—	—	—	—	—	—	—
