= Joe Malone =

Canadian ice hockey player (1890–1969)

- Hockey Hall of Fame, 1950
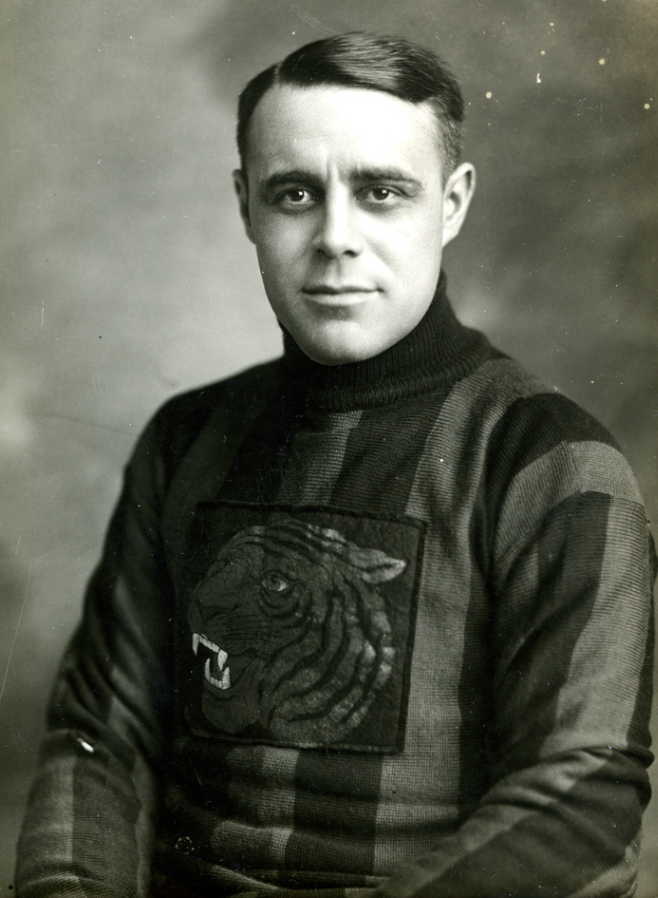
- Malone with the Hamilton Tigers in 1920
- Born: February 28, 1890 Saint-Colomb-de-Sillery, Quebec, Canada
- Died: May 15, 1969 (aged 79) Montreal, Quebec, Canada
- Height: 5 ft 10 in (178 cm)
- Weight: 150 lb (68 kg; 10 st 10 lb)
- Position: Centre
- Shot: Left
- Played for: Quebec Bulldogs; Waterloo Colts; Montreal Canadiens; Hamilton Tigers
- Playing career: 1910–1924

Maurice Joseph Cletus Malone (February 28, 1890 – May 15, 1969) was a Canadian professional ice hockey centre. He played in the National Hockey Association (NHA) and National Hockey League (NHL) for the Quebec Bulldogs, Montreal Canadiens, and Hamilton Tigers from 1910 to 1924. Known for his scoring feats and clean play, Malone led the NHL in goals and points in 1918 and 1920, and the NHA in goals twice, in 1913 and 1917 (in a tie). He won the Stanley Cup with Quebec in 1912 and 1913.

One of the first hockey superstars of the early 20th century, Malone holds or shares 13 NHL records that have stood unbroken over a century after his retirement, including seven that have never been matched. In the inaugural 1917–18 NHL season, Malone scored 2.20 goals per game over 20 games played, a single-season record that remains the highest ever. He is also the only player in the history of the NHL to score seven goals in a single game, accomplishing the feat in 1920. Malone was elected to the Hockey Hall of Fame in 1950.

== Personal life ==
Malone, the second of eleven children, was born in Saint-Colomb-de-Sillery, a town outside of Quebec City, on February 28, 1890. His father, Maurice Joseph Malone, was of Irish descent and also related to the Gignac family, of Quebecois origin. His mother was Marie-Louise Rochon, who was Quebecois herself. Maurice Joseph worked in the lumber industry, as did his father and grandfather. In 1916 he married Mathilda Power. During the First World War, Malone worked with the North American Arms Company. After his playing career, Malone worked for a telephone company in Montreal. He died of a heart attack on May 15, 1969, in Montreal, Quebec.

== Playing career ==
=== 1908–1917 ===
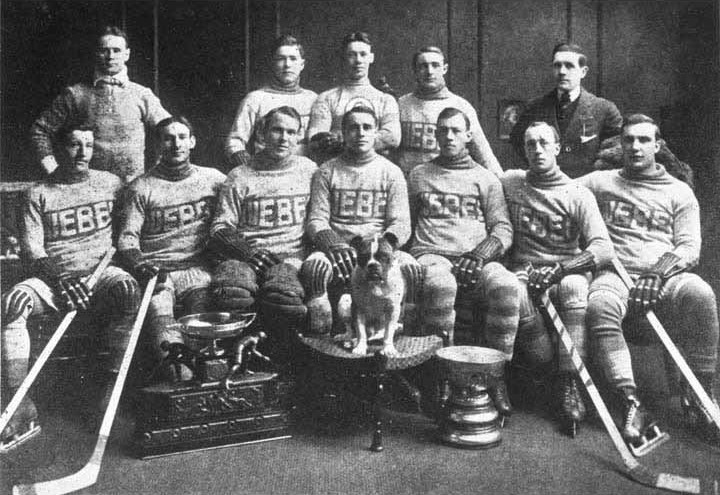
Malone (front row, middle) with the 1913 Stanley Cup champion Quebec Bulldogs

Malone played hockey from an early age: he was noted in local newspapers as early as 1904 for his exploits, with one report calling him "a rising star". As a junior he played with the Quebec Crescents and in 1909, at the age of 19, he joined the Quebec Bulldogs of the Eastern Canada Hockey Association, making his senior debut on January 2, 1909. He finished tied for third on the team in scoring with 8 goals in 12 games.

The next season, in 1910, a new league, the National Hockey Association (NHA), was formed but did not allow Quebec to join. Malone and several other Quebec players instead signed with the Waterloo Colts in the Ontario Professional Hockey League. With Waterloo, Malone played eleven games and scored nine goals. The Quebec club was reformed in 1911 and joined the NHA for the 1910–11 season, so Malone returned to the team, where he scored 9 goals in 13 games. He centred linemates such as Eddie Oatman and Jack Marks, he scored 21 goals in 18 games in the 1911–12 season, sixth overall in scoring, as Quebec finished first in the league, and consequently won the Stanley Cup.

Quebec again won the Cup in 1913 as Malone led the league with 43 goals in 20 games, including a career-best nine goals in a Cup match against Sydney. His brother Jeff Malone also played for Quebec in 1913 when they won the Stanley Cup. Malone finished fourth in the NHA during the 1913–14 season, with 24 goals in 17 games. He missed some games in the 1914–15 season due to spraining an ankle during a game in January 1915, which kept him out until mid-February; in the 12 games he played, he had 16 goals. Malone returned to form for 1915–16 when he finished second in goal scoring in the league with 25 goals in 24 games.

In 1916–17, Malone scored 41 goals in 19 games in the NHA, finishing tied for the scoring lead with Frank Nighbor of the Ottawa Senators. Malone was in the scoring lead until the final game of the season when he played Nighbor and the Senators. Ottawa had two players cover Malone the entire game, while Nighbor was able to score 5 goals and finish tied.

=== 1917–1924 ===
When the NHL was founded in 1917, Quebec did not operate a team in its first season, and the team's players were sold to the other teams for $700 each; Malone was claimed by the Montreal Canadiens. Playing on what was one of the most powerful forward lines of all time with Newsy Lalonde and Didier Pitre, Malone shifted to left wing to accommodate Lalonde. Malone scored one of the first goals in NHL history, on the league's opening night of December 19, 1917; he finished the game with five goals. He had two other games with five goals during the season, and finished with 44 goals in 20 games, leading the league. Malone established a league record for goals in a season that lasted until 1945; his goals-per-game average has not been surpassed. Malone scored at least one goal (and a total of 35 goals) in his first 14 NHL games to set the record for the longest goal-scoring streak to begin an NHL career. Having recorded just four assists to go with his goals for a total of 48 points, Malone set records for least amount of assists and points recorded for a 40-goal season, with both records still standing as of 2026; Malone's season is the only time in NHL history that a player recording a 40-goal season did not finish with 50 points.

Malone missed the first two games of the 1918–19 season owing to commitments to his job with the North American Arms Company. While he did play part of the season with the Canadiens, he was limited to only playing Saturday home games in Montreal, as he could not miss time from work. In the eight games he did play, he scored seven goals. In the league final series against Ottawa, he scored five goals in five games; a lingering arm injury held him out of the Stanley Cup Final against the Seattle Metropolitans, which was cancelled after five games due to the Spanish flu pandemic.

Quebec revived its franchise in 1919 and Malone rejoined the club, once more leading the league in scoring with 39 goals and setting a single-game goal-scoring mark which still stands at seven against Toronto on January 31, 1920. He scored six goals in a second game that season on March 10, 1920, against the Senators. While Malone had 39 goals in 24 games to lead the league in scoring, the team was very weak on the ice, and finished the season with 4 wins and 20 losses, last in the league.

The team was relocated to Hamilton for the 1921 season. Malone did not initially join the team, instead staying in Quebec to attend to his business interests. He joined the team in January 1921, having missed the first four games of the season. He finished fourth in league scoring with 28 goals. He finished fourth in scoring the following season, as well. For 1921–22 he served as a player-coach and manager for the Tigers.

Malone decided not to return to Hamilton for the 1922–23 season. He was traded back to the Canadiens on January 3, 1923, in exchange for Edmond Bouchard. He scored only a single goal that season while generally playing as a substitute. He played ten games without scoring the next season, playing his last game on January 26 against the Toronto St. Patricks.

== Playing style ==
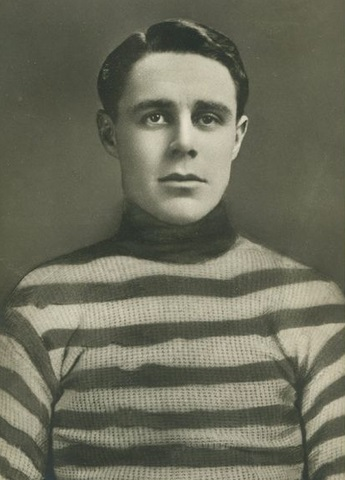
Malone with the Quebec Bulldogs, circa 1910–11

Malone spent the majority of his playing career as a centre, and he had a particular penchant for finding open space on the ice for his goal-scoring. Malone earned his famous nickname, "Phantom Joe", both for his dark eyes and for his ability to find openings offensively and weave his way to the net in an almost invisible fashion. In an era known for its violence and physicality, Malone was regarded more as a finesse player, with another nickname of his being "Gentleman Joe". Contrary to many other players of his era, such as his Quebec teammate Joe Hall (with the nickname "Bad Joe") and his Montreal teammate Newsy Lalonde, Malone also did not have a reputation as a particularly rough player, but rather as one of the cleanest players in the game.

"This fellow Malone, he is not the fastest but he is the smoothest forward in the league. He is absolutely reliable around a net. He is a great stickhandler, and a player who never gets flurried no matter how hard the going is. What Eddie Collins is to baseball, Malone is to hockey."

— Veteran ice hockey fan voicing his opinion on Joe Malone in the December 30, 1919 issue of the Ottawa Journal.

Malone was not considered to be one of the fastest players in the game, but rather a smooth player who knew exactly how to position himself around the opposing goal cage. The December 30, 1919 issue of the Ottawa Journal reproduced a conversation between three hockey fans, where a veteran spectator of 25 years, who had seen all the great players in the game, gave echo to this sentiment and compared Malone's abilities to those of baseball second baseman Eddie Collins, an opinion the newspaper itself agreed with.

== Legacy ==
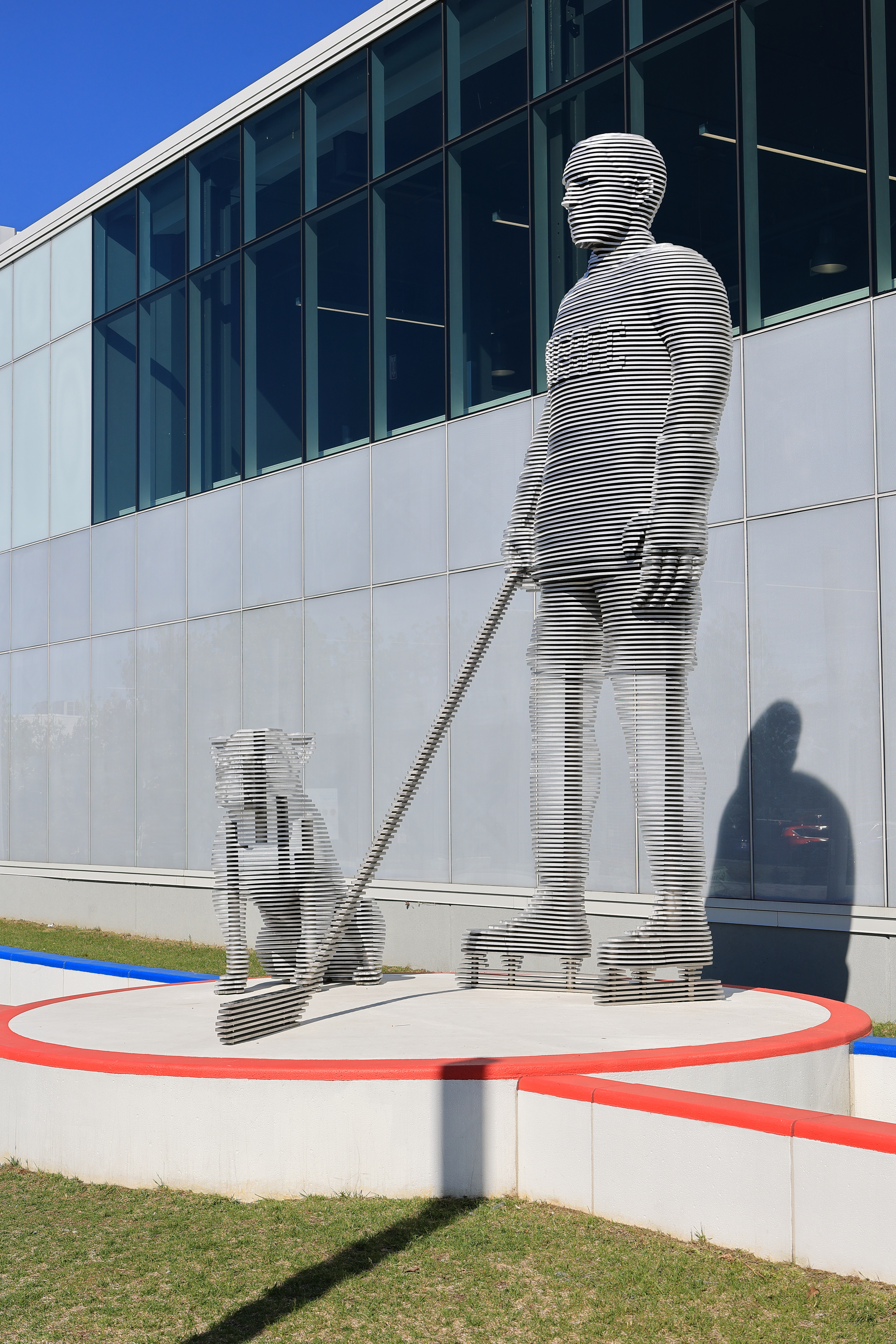
Malone statue at ExpoCité in Quebec City

Malone finished his career with 343 goals and 32 assists over 15 professional seasons. His 179 goals in the NHA were the most in the league's history. The 44 goals he scored in the 1917–18 season were an NHL record until Maurice Richard broke it in 1944–45 with 50 goals, while Malone's 49 points in 1919–20 were the most until Howie Morenz had 59 in 1927–28. He is also the only player in NHL history to score six goals in a game more than once.

He was elected to the Hockey Hall of Fame in 1950 and is also a member of Canada's Sports Hall of Fame, inducted in 1975. In 1998, he was ranked number 39 on The Hockey News' list of the 100 Greatest Hockey Players. The list was announced 74 years after his last game and 91 years after his professional debut, making him the earliest player on the list.

A statue by artist Frédéric Laforge of Malone with a bulldog, entitled Hommage à Joe Malone, was inaugurated on June 10, 2021, and is located at Place Jean-Béliveau at the ExpoCité in Quebec City. The statue pays homage to Malone's nickname, "Phantom Joe", being constructed with discs that are spaced apart, giving the illusion of a phantom.

== Career statistics ==
=== Regular season and playoffs ===
			Regular season					Playoffs
Season	Team	League	GP	G	A	Pts	PIM	GP	G	A	Pts	PIM
1907–08	Quebec Crescents	QAHA	—	—	—	—	—	—	—	—	—	—
1908–09	Quebec Bulldogs	ECHA	12	8	0	8	17	—	—	—	—	—
1909–10	Quebec Bulldogs	CHA	2	5	0	5	3	—	—	—	—	—
1909–10	Waterloo Colts	OPHL	12	10	0	10	16	—	—	—	—	—
1910–11	Quebec Bulldogs	NHA	13	9	0	9	3	—	—	—	—	—
1911–12	Quebec Bulldogs	NHA	18	21	0	21	0	—	—	—	—	—
1911–12	NHA All-Stars	Exhib	2	0	0	0	0	—	—	—	—	—
1911–12	Quebec Bulldogs	St-Cup	—	—	—	—	—	2	5	0	5	0
1912–13	Quebec Bulldogs	NHA	20	43	0	43	34	—	—	—	—	—
1912–13	Quebec Bulldogs	St-Cup	—	—	—	—	—	1	9	0	9	0
1913–14	Quebec Bulldogs	NHA	17	24	4	28	20	—	—	—	—	—
1914–15	Quebec Bulldogs	NHA	12	16	5	21	21	—	—	—	—	—
1915–16	Quebec Bulldogs	NHA	24	25	10	35	21	—	—	—	—	—
1916–17	Quebec Bulldogs	NHA	19	41	8	49	15	—	—	—	—	—
1917–18	Montreal Canadiens	NHL	20	44	4	48	30	2	1	0	1	3
1918–19	Montreal Canadiens	NHL	8	7	2	9	3	5	5	2	7	3
1919–20	Quebec Athletics	NHL	24	39	10	49	12	—	—	—	—	—
1920–21	Hamilton Tigers	NHL	20	28	9	37	6	—	—	—	—	—
1921–22	Hamilton Tigers	NHL	24	24	7	31	4	—	—	—	—	—
1922–23	Montreal Canadiens	NHL	20	1	0	1	2	2	0	0	0	0
1923–24	Montreal Canadiens	NHL	10	0	0	0	0	—	—	—	—	—
NHA totals			123	179	27	206	114	—	—	—	—	—
NHL totals			126	143	32	175	57	9	6	2	8	6
St-Cup totals			—	—	—	—	—	3	14	0	14	0

- Source: Total Hockey (Note: Assists were not officially counted for most of Malone's career. See Diamond 2002, p. 610.)

== NHL records (13) ==
- Most goals, game: 7 on January 31, 1920.
- Most goals, period: 4 (tied with ten other players) on February 16, 1918; March 10, 1920; February 23, 1921.
- Most goals, rookie, game: 5 (tied with four other players) on December 19, 1917; January 12, 1918; February 2, 1918.
- Most goals, rookie, first NHL game: 5 (tied with Harry Hyland) on December 19, 1917.
- Most points, rookie, first NHL game: 5 (tied with Al Hill and Harry Hyland) on December 19, 1917.
- Highest goals per game, season: 2.20 in 1917–18.
- Longest goal streak, rookie, season: 14 games in 1917–18.
- Longest goal streak, from start of season: 14 games in 1917–18.
- Longest goal streak, from start of season, rookie: 14 games in 1917–18.
- Longest point streak, from start of career: 14 games (tied with Dmitri Kvartalnov) in 1917–18.
- Most 4-goal games, season: 5 in 1917–18.
- Most 5-goal games, season: 3 in 1917–18.
- Fastest two goals, any time of playoff game: 0:05 seconds (tied with Norm Ullman) on February 22, 1919.

== See also ==
- List of past NHL scoring leaders
- List of players with five or more goals in an NHL game

== Bibliography ==
- "Malkin first in 89 years to score in first 6 NHL games". ESPN. Associated Press. November 1, 2006.
- Cameron, Steve, ed. (2018), Hockey Hall of Fame Book of Players (Third ed.), Buffalo, New York: Firefly Books, ISBN 978-0-228-10137-6
- Coleman, Charles L. (1964), The Trail of the Stanley Cup, Volume 1: 1893–1926 inc., Dubuque, Iowa: Kendall/Hunt Publishing, OCLC 957132
- Diamond, Dan, ed. (2002), Total Hockey: The Official Encyclopedia of the National Hockey League (Second ed.), New York: Total Sports Publishing, ISBN 1-892129-85-X
- Durand, Marc (2012), La Coupe à Québec: Les Bulldogs et la naissance du hockey à Québec [The Cup in Quebec: The Bulldogs and the birth of hockey in Quebec] (in French), Quebec City: Éditions Sylvain Harvey, ISBN 978-2-923794-48-8
- Dryden, Steve, ed. (1997), The Top 100 NHL Players of All Time, Toronto: McClelland & Stewart, ISBN 0-7710-4176-4
- Duff, Bob (2017), The First Season: 1917–18 and the Birth of the NHL, Windsor, Ontario: Biblioasis, ISBN 978-1-771961-84-4
- Fitsell, J.W (1987), Hockey's Captains, Colonels & Kings, Erin, Ontario: The Boston Mills Press, ISBN 0-919-783-68-6
- Holzman, Morey; Nieforth, Joseph (2002), Deceptions and Doublecross: How the NHL Conquered Hockey, Toronto: Dundurn Press, ISBN 1-55002-413-2
- Hommage à Joe Malone, Commission de la capitale nationale du Québec
- Jenish, D'Arcy (2008), The Montreal Canadiens: 100 Years of Glory, Toronto: Doubleday Canada, ISBN 978-0-385-66324-3
- Jenish, D'Arcy (1992), The Stanley Cup: A Hundred Years of Hockey at its Best, Toronto, Ontario: McClelland & Stewart Inc., ISBN 0-7710-4406-2
- Joe Malone CSHOF Biography, Canada's Sports Hall of Fame
- Joe Malone HHOF Biography, Hockey Hall of Fame
- Joe Malone NHL player page, National Hockey League
- McKinley, Michael (2009), Hockey: A People's History, Toronto: McClelland & Stewart, ISBN 978-0-7710-5771-7
- McKinley, Michael (2000), Putting a Roof on Winter: Hockey's Rise from Sport to Spectacle, Vancouver: Greystone Books, ISBN 1-55054-798-4
- "Sport Flashes", Ottawa Journal, Ottawa, December 12, 1934
- Wesley, Sam; Wesley, David (2005), Hamilton's Hockey Tigers, Toronto: James Lorimer & Company, ISBN 978-1-55028-887-2

Sporting positions
Preceded by Unknown	Quebec Bulldogs captain 1910–1917, 1919–1920	Succeeded by Relocated as Hamilton Tigers
Awards and achievements
Preceded by None	NHL scoring champion 1918	Succeeded by Newsy Lalonde
Preceded by Newsy Lalonde	NHL scoring champion 1920	Succeeded by Newsy Lalonde
