= Alberta Senior Hockey League =

Alberta Senior Hockey League (ASHL) may refer to:

- Alberta Senior Hockey League (1936–1941)
- Alberta Senior Hockey League (1965–1978)

== See also ==
- Alberta Junior Hockey League
- Alberta Midget Hockey League
