= Max Bentley =

Canadian ice hockey player (1920–1984)

- Hockey Hall of Fame, 1966
- Born: March 1, 1920 Delisle, Saskatchewan, Canada
- Died: January 18, 1984 (aged 63) Saskatoon, Saskatchewan, Canada
- Height: 5 ft 9 in (175 cm)
- Weight: 158 lb (72 kg; 11 st 4 lb)
- Position: Centre
- Shot: Left
- Played for: Chicago Black Hawks; Toronto Maple Leafs; New York Rangers
- Playing career: 1940–1954

Maxwell Herbert Lloyd Bentley (March 1, 1920 – January 18, 1984) was a Canadian professional ice hockey player who played for the Chicago Black Hawks, Toronto Maple Leafs, and New York Rangers in the National Hockey League (NHL) as part of a professional and senior career that spanned 20 years. He was the NHL's leading scorer twice in a row, and in 1946 won the Hart Trophy as the most valuable player. He played in four All-Star Games and was twice named to a post-season All-Star team.

Bentley was one of six hockey-playing brothers, and at one point played with four of his brothers with the Drumheller Miners of the Alberta Senior Hockey League. In 1942–43, he made NHL history when he played on the league's first all-brother line with Doug and Reg. He played five seasons in Chicago with Doug before a 1947 trade sent him to the Maple Leafs in one of the most significant transactions in NHL history to that point. Bentley won three Stanley Cup championships with the Maple Leafs before spending a final NHL season with the Rangers in 1953–54. He then returned to his home in Saskatoon to finish his playing career. Considered one of the best players of his era, Bentley was inducted into the Hockey Hall of Fame in 1966. Bentley was named one of the NHL's 100 greatest players of all-time by the NHL in 2017.

== Early life ==
Bentley was born March 1, 1920, in Delisle, Saskatchewan. He was the youngest of six boys, and one of thirteen children. His father Bill was a native of Yorkshire, England who emigrated to the United States as a child and became a speed skating champion in North Dakota before settling in Delisle. He became mayor and helped build the town's covered skating rink. All of the Bentley children were athletes, and all six brothers played hockey. Bill Bentley believed that all six boys could have played in the National Hockey League (NHL), though responsibilities on the family farm resulted in the eldest four boys spending the majority of their careers playing senior hockey on the Canadian Prairies.

His father taught Bentley to play hockey on their farm, where the family patriarch believed the daily chores would give his children the strength to have strong shots. Bentley's father also taught him to use his speed to elude bigger and stronger opponents as he weighed only 155 pounds fully grown. He played two years in Rosetown, Saskatchewan between 1935 and 1937 where he led the Saskatchewan Intermediate league in scoring as a 16-year-old. He moved onto the Drumheller Miners of the Alberta Senior Hockey League (ASHL) in 1937, leading that league in scoring while playing on a line with brothers Roy and Wyatt. The trio were joined in Drumheller by Doug and Reg for the 1938–39 season. The family operated a gas station in town when not playing hockey.

== Professional career ==
=== Chicago Black Hawks ===
While playing for Rosetown, Bentley attended a tryout camp for the Boston Bruins. Believing him too small to play in the NHL, the Bruins sent him home. He then traveled to Montreal for a tryout with the Canadiens. The team advised him to see a doctor who stated he had a heart condition, and that if he did not quit hockey, he would be dead within a year. Bentley chose to continue playing, but developed into a hypochondriac following the diagnosis. He constantly complained of aches, pains and ailments, and carried so many drugs and medications he was known as a "walking drug store".

He played two years of senior hockey in Drumheller, and one more with the Saskatoon Quakers in the Saskatchewan Senior Hockey League (SSHL) before playing his first professional games with the Providence Reds of the American Hockey League (AHL) in 1940–41. He caught the attention of the Chicago Black Hawks, and while the team was impressed with his play, they wanted him to start with their American Hockey Association (AHA) affiliate in Kansas City. Bentley initially refused, and considered retiring. He was convinced to report by Kansas City's coach, Johnny Gottselig, and played only five games before injuries in Chicago led the Black Hawks to request a call-up. Gottselig sent Bentley up, reuniting him with brother Doug who had joined Chicago in 1939. Max played his first NHL game on November 21, 1940, against the Bruins. He scored his first goal on December 1 against the New York Rangers.

In his third NHL season, 1942–43, Bentley scored 70 points to finish third in the league in scoring. He finished three points behind brother Doug, who won the scoring title. Max tied an NHL record by scoring four goals in one period of a 10–1 victory over the Rangers on January 28, 1943. He added three assists in the game, tying the league record at the time for points in one game with seven. He was called for only one penalty during the season, and as a result was voted the winner of the Lady Byng Trophy as the league's most sportsmanlike player.

World War II had decimated the rosters of all NHL teams, and with the Black Hawks searching for players, Max and Doug convinced the team to sign their brother Reg. The trio made history on January 1, 1943, when they became the first all-brother line the NHL had seen. Two nights later, Max and Doug assisted on Reg's first, and only, NHL goal, the only time in league history that a trio of family members recorded the goal and assists on a scoring play. While Max and Doug were established NHL stars, Reg played only 11 games in his NHL career.

Bentley's career was interrupted in 1943 when he joined the Canadian Infantry Corps. He was briefly stationed in Victoria, British Columbia, where he completed the 1942–43 season playing with the Victoria Navy team then spent the following two years stationed in Calgary where he played with the Calgary Currie Army team in the Canadian military leagues. He led the Alberta league in goals and points with 18 and 31 respectively in 1943–44.

Following the war, Bentley returned to the Black Hawks where he was reunited with his brother Doug and joined on a line by Bill Mosienko. The trio, who were all small and exceptionally fast, were dubbed the "Pony Line" and emerged as one of the top scoring lines in the league. Max led the league in scoring with 61 points, and was awarded the Hart Trophy as the league's most valuable player. He was the first Black Hawk to ever win the award.

Bentley again led the league in scoring in 1946–47, recording 72 points in 60 games. He won the title on the final night of the season, finishing one point ahead of Montreal's Maurice Richard. In doing so, he became only the third player in NHL history to win consecutive scoring titles after Charlie Conacher and Sweeney Schriner, both of whom accomplished the feat in the 1930s. He then played in the 1st National Hockey League All-Star Game on October 13, 1947, for the NHL All-Stars, a 4–3 victory over the Toronto Maple Leafs.

=== Toronto Maple Leafs ===
"It is the biggest deal in NHL hockey in a long, long time and only goes to emphasize the worth of such a player as Bentley and puts him on a very high plane."

— NHL President Clarence Campbell's assessment of the trade that sent Bentley to Toronto.

Three weeks later and six games into the season, the Maple Leafs completed a deal to acquire Bentley. He was sent to Toronto with Cy Thomas in exchange for Gus Bodnar, Bud Poile, Gaye Stewart, Ernie Dickens and Bob Goldham, on November 2, 1947. The trade sent shockwaves throughout the league. The five players sent to Chicago essentially formed an entire starting unit; NHL President Clarence Campbell stated he was "astounded" by the deal, and stated it ranked with the Maple Leafs' purchase of King Clancy in 1930 as one of the most significant transactions in league history. The trade was still being discussed weeks later as observers throughout the league attempted to assess which team received the better deal. Bentley was initially disappointed to leave his brother in Chicago, but quickly adapted to Toronto where he was immediately popular.

With the Leafs, Bentley challenged for his third consecutive scoring title. He eventually finished fifth with 54 points, seven behind Elmer Lach's league-leading 61. The Leafs finished in first place in the regular season standings, then went on to win the Stanley Cup in a four-game sweep over the Detroit Red Wings in the 1948 Stanley Cup Final. Bentley was overjoyed, stating: "I waited a long time for this. A Stanley Cup championship at last!"

Bentley and the Leafs struggled in the 1948–49 regular season. He fell to 41 points on the year – 31 less than his total of two seasons previous – while the Leafs finished fourth out of six teams. The team recovered in the playoffs, eliminating the Red Wings in four consecutive games for the second year in a row to win the team's third consecutive Stanley Cup. Bentley scored the third goal in a 3–1 win in the deciding contest.

The Leafs' championship streak came to an end in 1949–50 but Bentley showed a modest improvement offensively, leading the team with 23 goals. He contemplated retiring and returning to Saskatchewan, but chose to return to Toronto for the 1950–51 season. He finished the season with significantly improved scoring totals, finishing third in the league with 62 points, behind Maurice Richard's 66, and Gordie Howe's league-record 86. The Leafs faced the Canadiens in the 1951 Stanley Cup Final, which was won by Toronto in five games. Bentley finished with 13 points in the playoffs, tying him with Richard for the league lead.

After finishing the 1951–52 season with 41 points, Bentley contemplated his future in hockey. He mused about an opportunity to coach the Calgary Stampeders of the Western Hockey League (WHL) and stated a desire to play again with his brother Doug, but ultimately returned to Toronto. He only played in 36 games in 1952–53 after suffering a back injury, but reached 500 career points on November 5, 1952, with two goals against the Rangers.

=== New York and Saskatoon ===
Following the season, the New York Rangers offered Max and Doug Bentley the opportunity to play together again. The Rangers acquired both players in cash transactions over the summer. Max finished the season with 32 points in 54 games, while Doug played only 20 games. Bentley's rights reverted to the Maple Leafs in the fall of 1954 when he refused to report to the Rangers for the 1954–55 NHL season. From the Leafs, he demanded a C$20,000 contract, more than the team was willing to pay. He was initially placed on the suspended list by Toronto after he refused to report to training camp and attempted to purchase his release from the team. Bentley expressed a desire to leave the NHL and play for the WHL's Saskatoon Quakers, where Doug had become coach. The Maple Leafs ultimately supported Bentley's request. At the time he was granted his release, he was second amongst all active players with 245 goals, behind only Richard.

He joined the Quakers in November 1954 to great excitement in Saskatoon. Bentley finished the season with 41 points in 40 games. He began the 1955–56 season with Saskatoon, but retired on November 15, 1955, due to recurring back problems. He played his final game on that night, scoring his final goal in an 8–3 victory over the Winnipeg Warriors.

In 1956, Bentley joined his brother Doug in hockey management when the brothers launched a new Saskatchewan Junior Hockey League (SJHL) team in Saskatoon. He attempted to get into coaching, first offering his services to the WHL's Vancouver Canucks in the winter of 1961, before going south to coach the Burbank Stars of the California Hockey league in 1962. His nephew Bev and son Lynn played with him in Burbank, while Doug was the player-coach of the rival Long Beach Gulls.

== Playing style ==
Max Bentley was known for his speed, passing and puck handling skills. He learned his trade with his brothers as they constantly played street hockey in the summers and on the ice in the winters. Bentley's father flooded a sheet of ice that was the length of a regulation NHL hockey rink but much narrower, forcing the boys to develop the ability to maintain control of the puck while making fast, hard turns to reach the net. He was nicknamed the "Dipsy Doodle Dandy from Delisle" in reference to his ability to skate around opponents who often found that the only way to stop him was via rough play. Bentley was able to score from nearly any angle, an ability that confounded even his brother Doug. Long-time prairie hockey promoter Bill Hunter said Bentley was "a phenomenal hockey player, an absolute artist with the puck". Opponents occasionally attempted to use Bentley's hypochondria against him, making remarks on how he looked ill in a bid to distract him during the game.

Bentley was inducted into the Hockey Hall of Fame in 1966, two years after his brother Doug. One year later, Max and Doug were inducted together into the Saskatchewan Sports Hall of Fame. The Hockey News ranked him 48th on its 1998 list of the top 100 players of all time.

== Personal life ==
In addition to hockey, Bentley and his brothers played baseball in the summers. Representing their hometown of Delisle, they participated in regional tournaments and were repeat winners. Bentley played summer baseball throughout the 1950s, and was a member of the Saskatoon Gems of the Western Canada Senior League. He was also a long-time curler, often playing with his brothers, son and nephews.

The majority of Bentley's time away from the hockey rink was spent on the family farm outside Delisle. The Bentleys operated a large farm, raising cattle and growing wheat, and Max tended to return to the farm to recuperate during hockey seasons when he felt he needed to rest up. He and his wife Betty had a son, Lynn, who was also a hockey player and a younger son, Gary. Bentley died at his home in Saskatoon on January 18, 1984, at the age of 63.

== Career statistics ==
=== Regular season and playoffs ===
			Regular season					Playoffs
Season	Team	League	GP	G	A	Pts	PIM	GP	G	A	Pts	PIM
1937–38	Drumheller Miners	ASHL	26	28	15	43	10	5	7	1	8	2
1938–39	Drumheller Miners	ASHL	32	29	24	53	16	6	5	3	8	6
1939–40	Saskatoon Quakers	SSHL	31	37	14	51	4	4	1	1	2	2
1940–41	Providence Reds	AHL	9	4	2	6	0	—	—	—	—	—
1940–41	Kansas City Americans	AHA	5	5	5	10	0	—	—	—	—	—
1940–41	Chicago Black Hawks	NHL	36	7	10	17	6	4	1	3	4	2
1941–42	Chicago Black Hawks	NHL	38	13	17	30	2	3	2	0	2	0
1942–43	Chicago Black Hawks	NHL	47	26	44	70	2	—	—	—	—	—
1945–46	Chicago Black Hawks	NHL	47	31	30	61	6	4	1	0	1	4
1946–47	Chicago Black Hawks	NHL	60	29	43	72	12	—	—	—	—	—
1947–48	Chicago Black Hawks	NHL	6	3	3	6	0	—	—	—	—	—
1947–48	Toronto Maple Leafs	NHL	53	23	25	48	14	9	4	7	11	0
1948–49	Toronto Maple Leafs	NHL	60	19	22	41	18	9	4	3	7	2
1949–50	Toronto Maple Leafs	NHL	69	23	18	41	14	7	3	3	6	0
1950–51	Toronto Maple Leafs	NHL	67	21	41	62	34	11	2	11	13	4
1951–52	Toronto Maple Leafs	NHL	69	24	17	41	40	4	1	0	1	2
1952–53	Toronto Maple Leafs	NHL	36	12	11	23	16	—	—	—	—	—
1953–54	New York Rangers	NHL	57	14	18	32	15	—	—	—	—	—
1954–55	Saskatoon Quakers	WHL	40	24	17	41	23	—	—	—	—	—
1955–56	Saskatoon Quakers	WHL	10	2	2	4	20	—	—	—	—	—
1958–59	Saskatoon Quakers	WHL	26	6	12	18	2	—	—	—	—	—
1962–63	Burbank Stars	CalHL	—	—	—	—	—	—	—	—	—	—
NHL totals			645	245	299	544	179	51	18	27	45	14
WHL totals			76	32	31	63	45	—	—	—	—	—

== See also ==
- List of family relations in the NHL

Preceded by Elmer Lach	NHL scoring champion 1946, 1947	Succeeded by Elmer Lach
Preceded by Elmer Lach	Winner of the Hart Trophy; 1946	Succeeded by Maurice Richard
Preceded by Syl Apps	Winner of the Lady Byng Trophy; 1943	Succeeded by Clint Smith
