= Bev Bentley =

Canadian ice hockey player (1927–2023)

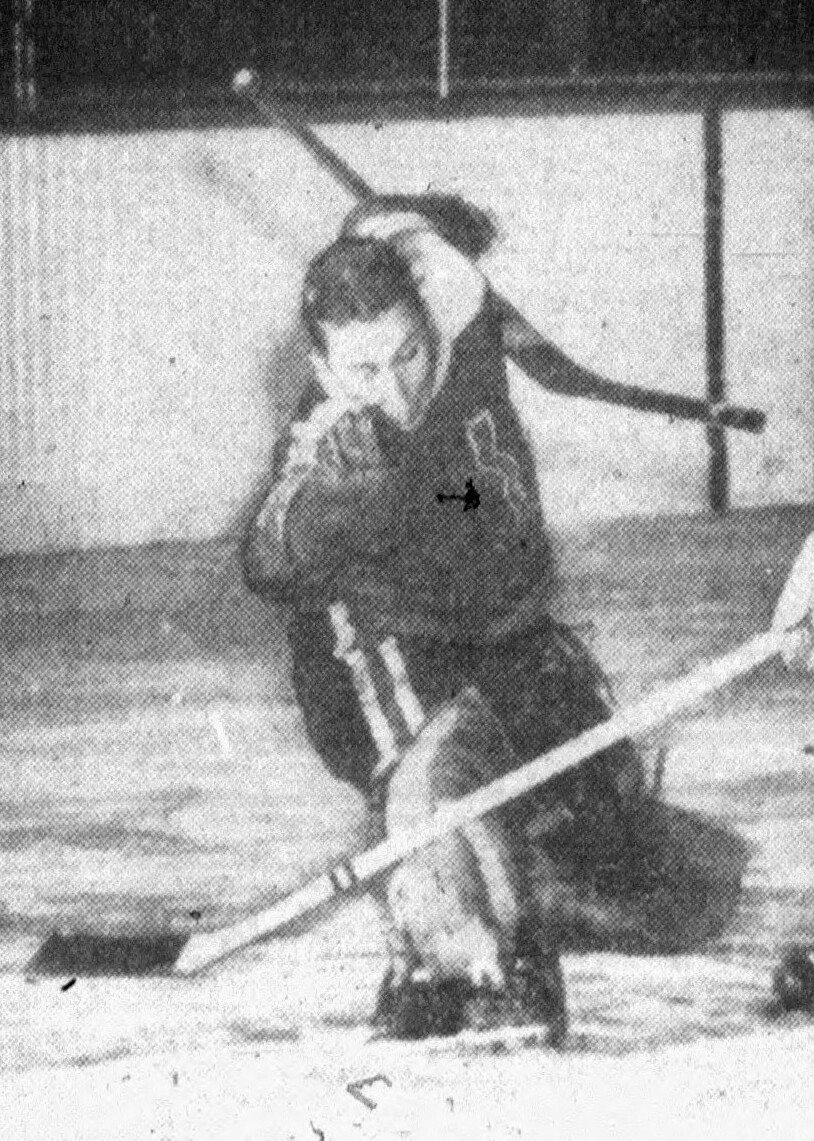
- Bentley in 1947
- Born: June 8, 1927; Delisle, Saskatchewan, Canada
- Died: October 6, 2023 (aged 96); Saskatoon, Saskatchewan, Canada
- Height: 6 ft 0 in (183 cm)
- Weight: 175 lb (79 kg; 12 st 7 lb)
- Position: Goaltender
- Shot: Right
- Played for: Seattle Bombers; Saskatoon Quakers; Vancouver Canucks; New Westminster Royals; Victoria Cougars; Seattle Totems; San Francisco Seals
- Playing career: 1943–1967

Beverly Mitchell Bentley (June 8, 1927 – October 6, 2023) was a Canadian ice hockey player. He played 618 games as a goalie in the Western Hockey League, playing with the Seattle Bombers, Saskatoon Quakers, Vancouver Canucks, New Westminster Royals, Victoria Cougars, Seattle Totems, and San Francisco Seals. He also played for the Knoxville Knights of the Eastern Hockey League.

Bentley was a nephew of former NHL players Reg, Doug and Max, and son of Roy Bentley. Bentley died at a hospital in Saskatoon on October 6, 2023, at the age of 96.
