= Doug Bentley =

Canadian ice hockey player (1916–1972)

- Hockey Hall of Fame, 1964
- Born: September 3, 1916 Delisle, Saskatchewan, Canada
- Died: November 24, 1972 (aged 56) Saskatoon, Saskatchewan, Canada
- Height: 5 ft 8 in (173 cm)
- Weight: 145 lb (66 kg; 10 st 5 lb)
- Position: Left wing
- Shot: Left
- Played for: Chicago Black Hawks; New York Rangers
- Playing career: 1933–1962

Douglas Wagner Bentley (September 3, 1916 – November 24, 1972) was a Canadian ice hockey player who was a left winger for 13 seasons in the National Hockey League (NHL) for the Chicago Black Hawks and New York Rangers as part of a senior and professional career that lasted from 1933 to 1962. He was named to four NHL All-Star teams in his career and was the scoring leader in points and goals in 1942–43 and again in goals in 1943–44.

Bentley was one of six hockey playing brothers and at one point played with four of his brothers with the Drumheller Miners of the Alberta Senior Hockey League. He made NHL history when he played on the league's first all-brother line with Max and Reg in 1943. Injuries forced him out of the NHL in 1951, but he returned in 1953–54 to play one last season for the Rangers with Max. He spent several seasons as a player-coach for the Saskatoon Quakers, leading the team to the Pacific Coast Hockey League championship in 1952. Bentley was inducted into the Hockey Hall of Fame in 1964.

== Early life ==
Bentley was born March 1, 1916, in Delisle, Saskatchewan. He was the fifth of six boys and one of thirteen children. His father Bill was a native of Yorkshire, England, who emigrated to the United States as a child and became a speed skating champion in North Dakota before settling in Delisle. He became mayor and helped build the town's covered skating rink. All of the Bentley children were athletes, and all six brothers played hockey.

Bill Bentley believed that all six boys could have played in the National Hockey League (NHL), though responsibilities on the family farm resulted in the eldest four boys spending the majority of their careers playing senior hockey on the Canadian Prairies. Doug was a small, slender player, weighing only 145 lbs at the peak of his career, but he was an exceptionally fast skater and his father taught him to use his speed to avoid larger opponents. He learned his trade with his brothers as they constantly played street hockey in the summers and on the ice in the winters. Bentley's father flooded a sheet of ice that was the length of a regulation NHL hockey rink but much narrower, forcing the boys to develop the ability to maintain control of the puck while making fast, hard turns to reach the net.

== Playing career ==
=== Senior hockey ===
Bentley's early career was spent with several senior teams throughout Saskatchewan. He first played in his hometown of Delisle for the Tigers hockey team in 1932–33 before playing a year in Saskatoon, then another in Regina before settling in Moose Jaw for three seasons beginning in 1935–36. He led the South-Saskatchewan Senior Hockey League in scoring in 1936–37 with 37 points and added another 14 in the playoffs, also leading the league. In 1937, Bentley, along with future Hall of Famer Elmer Lach attended the Toronto Maple Leafs training camp; both were rejected as too small for the National Hockey League. According to Lach, Conn Smythe, manager of the Leafs, saw Bentley and Lach and said "They were sending me big guys from the West, but instead they’ve sent me peanuts." He moved to Alberta with brother Reg, and joined elder brothers Max, Wyatt and Roy with the Drumheller Miners of the Alberta Senior Hockey League (ASHL) for the 1938–39 season. When not playing hockey, Doug helped run a gas station that the family purchased in Drumheller.

=== Chicago Black Hawks ===
The Chicago Black Hawks signed Bentley to a contract in the fall of 1939. He had previously been placed on the protected list of the Montreal Canadiens, meaning they were the only NHL team eligible to sign him to a contract. They subsequently dealt his NHL rights to the Boston Bruins for Vic Myles. When he and brother Max went to Boston for a tryout camp, Bruins' owner Art Ross declared them "among the worst amateurs to come to my camp". However, by the time Chicago signed him, Bentley had established himself as one of the top forwards on the prairies.

Bentley appeared in 39 games in his rookie campaign with Chicago, scoring 12 goals and 19 points. His brother Max joined him early in the 1941–42 season, and the pair were placed on a line together. After two years of development with the Black Hawks, Bentley emerged as the NHL's scoring leader in 1942–43 with 73 points, a total that tied Cooney Weiland's NHL record for points in a season. He was the first Black Hawks player to finish as the scoring leader, and finished second in voting for the Hart Trophy as most valuable player.

World War II had decimated the rosters of all NHL teams, and with the Black Hawks searching for players, Max and Doug convinced the team to sign their brother Reg. The trio made history on January 1, 1943, when they became the first all-brother line the NHL had seen. Two nights later, Max and Doug assisted on Reg's first, and only, NHL goal. It is the only time in league history that a trio of family members recorded the goal and assists on a scoring play. While Max and Doug were established NHL stars, Reg played only 11 games in his NHL career.

In 1943–44, Bentley again led the NHL in goal scoring with 38, and was named a first team All-Star at left wing for the second consecutive season. In games 4 and 5 of the 1944 semifinals, Bradley scored three goals in each game to become the first NHL player in history to record back-to-back "hat tricks" in the postseason (a mark not accomplished again until Jari Kurri in 1985); he also was the first Black Hawks player to record a hat trick in a playoff game.

His career was briefly halted in 1944 when, after playing an exhibition game with Chicago in Canada prior to the 1944–45 season, Canadian officials refused to allow him to return to the United States. He was given permission by military authorities to return to his family farm for the duration of the war, and signed on to play with the Laura Beavers of the Saskatchewan Intermediate Hockey League. The Beavers went on to win the western Canadian intermediate championship, defeating a team from Canmore, Alberta, to capture the title.

Following the war, Bentley returned to the Black Hawks where he was reunited with his brother Max. The brothers and Bill Mosienko formed a line in which each player was small and exceptionally fast; they were dubbed the "Pony Line" and emerged as one of the top scoring lines in the league. Max led the NHL in scoring with 61 points, while Doug scored 40 points in just 36 games for Chicago. He improved to 55 points in 1946–47 and was named a First Team All-Star for the third time. He played in the first All-Star Game on October 13, 1947, for the NHL All-Stars, who defeated the Toronto Maple Leafs, 4–3.

The Black Hawks, who never iced a strong lineup while Bentley played, made a significant trade early in the 1947–48 season. They sent Max Bentley and a prospect to the Toronto Maple Leafs in exchange for five players. The trade shocked Doug. He thought about retiring following the deal but felt he could give Chicago at least one more good season. He gave them several good seasons, finished the following three seasons with 57, 66 and 52 points respectively, was named to the second All-Star team in 1949, and appeared in four more All-Star Games in 1948, 1949, 1950 and 1951. Chicago's Herald American newspaper named him the city's top hockey player of the half-century in 1950.

=== Saskatoon and New York ===
Injuries, including a pulled groin muscle, plagued Bentley in 1950–51 and limited him to 44 games. He played only eight games of the 1951–52 NHL season before the Black Hawks allowed him to return to Saskatchewan. He was loaned to the Saskatoon Quakers where he took on the role of player-coach for the Pacific Coast Hockey League (PCHL) team. Bentley appeared in 35 regular season games for the Quakers then scored 12 points in 13 games to lead the Quakers to the President's Cup championship.

Bentley remained with Saskatoon in 1952–53, appearing in all 70 league games for the Quakers. Following the season, the New York Rangers lured Bentley back to the NHL, acquiring his brother Max, then purchasing his rights from Chicago. In his first game with the Rangers, he scored a goal and three assists. He played 20 games with the Rangers, scoring 12 points, but returned to Saskatoon to coach the team in their playoffs once the Rangers' season ended. Bentley continued as Saskatoon's player-coach until 1955.

In the midst of the 1955–56 season, Bentley surprised his team by announcing his resignation as a coach. He initially agreed to continue as a player, but when the team announced as his replacement a player who was formerly subordinate to him as coach, Bentley felt it best to leave to avoid embarrassing his successor. The 39-year-old Bentley immediately received offers from other Western Hockey League (WHL) teams, including the New Westminster Royals. He chose to finish the season with the Brandon Regals.

== Coaching career ==
Bentley did not play during the 1956–57 season, as he and Max chose instead to operate a new Saskatchewan Junior Hockey League team in Saskatoon. He first served as the team's manager, and after briefly playing with the WHL's Saskatoon/St. Paul Regals in 1957–58, became the head coach of the junior team. He remained in the position until 1961 when he left to become chief scout with the WHL's Los Angeles Blades for the 1961–62 season.

He was named an assistant coach midway through the year and even played when injuries forced players out of the lineup. Bentley moved on to become the player-coach of the Long Beach Gulls of the California Hockey League in 1962–63, opposing his brother Max who coached the Burbank Stars. He returned to his Saskatchewan home in 1964 to coach the senior Saskatoon Quakers for one season. He was inducted into the Hockey Hall of Fame that same year. He then moved to the Eastern Hockey League's Knoxville Knights in 1966–67, and finally the Edmonton Nuggets of the Western Canada Senior Hockey League in 1967–68.

== Personal life ==
Throughout the 1950s, Bentley and his brothers played baseball for both their home town of Delisle and the Saskatoon Gems of the Saskatchewan and later Western Canada senior leagues. He played as an outfielder.

Bentley and his wife Betty had three daughters and one son. Their son, Doug Jr., was also a hockey player. Much of Doug Sr.'s time away from the rink was spent at the family farm near Delisle. The family operated a large farm, raising cattle and growing wheat. Bentley battled cancer in his later life, first requiring surgery in Edmonton in 1969. A second operation followed in 1970, but he died of the disease on November 24, 1972.

== Career statistics ==
=== Regular season and playoffs ===
			Regular season					Playoffs
Season	Team	League	GP	G	A	Pts	PIM	GP	G	A	Pts	PIM
1933–34	Saskatoon Wesleys	N-SSHL	4	3	3	6	0	9	3	1	4	8
1934–35	Regina Victorias	S-SSHL	19	10	4	14	21	6	0	0	0	13
1935–36	Moose Jaw Millers	S-SSHL	20	3	3	6	30	—	—	—	—	—
1936–37	Moose Jaw Millers	S-SSHL	24	18	19	37	49	3	3	0	3	4
1937–38	Moose Jaw Millers	S-SSHL	21	25	18	43	20	6	6	8	14	6
1938–39	Drumheller Miners	ASHL	32	24	29	53	31	—	—	—	—	—
1939–40	Chicago Black Hawks	NHL	39	12	7	19	12	2	0	0	0	0
1940–41	Chicago Black Hawks	NHL	46	8	20	28	12	5	1	1	2	4
1941–42	Chicago Black Hawks	NHL	38	12	14	26	11	3	0	1	1	4
1942–43	Chicago Black Hawks	NHL	50	33	40	73	18	—	—	—	—	—
1943–44	Chicago Black Hawks	NHL	50	38	39	77	22	9	8	4	12	4
1945–46	Chicago Black Hawks	NHL	36	19	21	40	16	4	0	2	2	0
1946–47	Chicago Black Hawks	NHL	52	21	34	55	18	—	—	—	—	—
1947–48	Chicago Black Hawks	NHL	60	20	37	57	16	—	—	—	—	—
1948–49	Chicago Black Hawks	NHL	58	23	43	66	38	—	—	—	—	—
1949–50	Chicago Black Hawks	NHL	64	20	33	53	28	—	—	—	—	—
1950–51	Chicago Black Hawks	NHL	44	9	23	32	20	—	—	—	—	—
1951–52	Chicago Black Hawks	NHL	8	2	3	5	4	—	—	—	—	—
1951–52	Saskatoon Quakers	PCHL	35	11	14	25	12	—	—	—	—	—
1952–53	Saskatoon Quakers	WHL	70	22	23	45	37	13	6	3	9	14
1953–54	Saskatoon Quakers	WHL	42	8	13	21	18	—	—	—	—	—
1953–54	New York Rangers	NHL	20	2	10	12	2	—	—	—	—	—
1954–55	Saskatoon Quakers	WHL	61	14	23	37	52	—	—	—	—	—
1955–56	Saskatoon Quakers/Brandon Regals	WHL	60	7	26	33	21	—	—	—	—	—
1957–58	Saskatoon/St. Paul Regals	WHL	19	11	16	27	0	—	—	—	—	—
1961–62	Los Angeles Blades	WHL	8	0	2	2	2	—	—	—	—	—
1962–63	Long Beach Gulls	CalHL	—	—	—	—	—	—	—	—	—	—
NHL totals			565	219	324	543	217	23	9	8	17	12
WHL totals			260	62	103	165	130	13	6	3	9	14

== See also ==
- List of family relations in the NHL

Preceded by Gaye Stewart	Chicago Black Hawks captain 1949–50	Succeeded by Jack Stewart
Preceded by Earl Seibert	Chicago Black Hawks captain 1942–44	Succeeded by Clint Smith
Preceded by Bryan Hextall	NHL Scoring Champion; 1943	Succeeded by Herb Cain
