= Peter Bondra =

Slovak ice hockey player (born 1968)

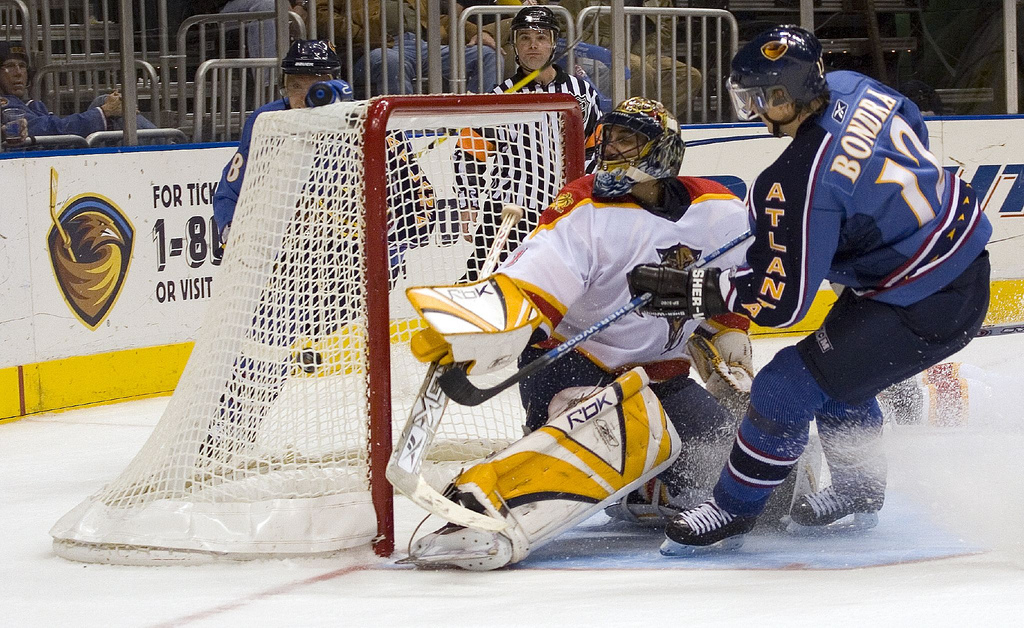
- Bondra with the Atlanta Thrashers in 2005
- Born: 7 February 1968 (age 58) Lutsk, Ukrainian SSR, Soviet Union
- Height: 6 ft 0 in (183 cm)
- Weight: 200 lb (91 kg; 14 st 4 lb)
- Position: Right wing
- Shot: Left
- Played for: HC Košice; Washington Capitals; Ottawa Senators; HK ŠKP Poprad; Atlanta Thrashers; Chicago Blackhawks
- National team: Slovakia
- NHL draft: 156th overall, 1990; Washington Capitals
- Playing career: 1986–2007

Peter Bondra (Slovak pronunciation: [ˈpeter ˈbɔndra]; born 7 February 1968) is a Ukrainian-born Slovak former professional ice hockey player who played 16 seasons in the National Hockey League (NHL) for the Washington Capitals, Ottawa Senators, Atlanta Thrashers, and Chicago Blackhawks.

Drafted by the Capitals at the age of 22 in 1990, Bondra made the team in his rookie season with no time needed in the minor leagues. He recorded 12 goals in his rookie season before quickly becoming a productive scorer for the Capitals for the next decade, which saw him record thirteen consecutive 20-goal seasons with the team. He is one of the few players who scored five or more goals in one NHL game, having done so on 5 February 1994. He became the first Capitals player to lead the NHL in goals scored for a season, doing so in 1994–95 and 1997–98. Bondra helped lead the Capitals to their first ever Stanley Cup Final appearance in 1998. In the 2002 IIHF World Championship, representing the Slovakia national team, he scored the game-winning goal to win the world championship for the first time ever. By the time he was traded by Washington in the middle of the 2003–04 season, he was the all-time team leader in goals (472) and points (825) in franchise history.

After spending the latter half of the 2004 season with the Ottawa Senators and the ensuing NHL lockout, Bondra returned to the NHL for the 2005–06 season with the Atlanta Thrashers, where he had his fourteenth straight 20-goal season. He joined the Chicago Blackhawks in free agency for the 2006–07 season. On 22 December 2006, Bondra became the 37th player in National Hockey League (NHL) history to score 500 NHL goals. He retired after the season ended to become the general manager of the Slovakia national team, where he served until 2011. Currently, he works for the Capitals in as their Director of Alumni Affairs & Business Development.

A scorer of 503 goals in 1,081 games, Bondra is one of four eligible 500-goal players not currently in the Hockey Hall of Fame. He has the fewest points among all players who reached that milestone, with 892, making him one of only two (with Maurice Richard) 500-goal scorers not on the list of NHL players with 1,000 points. He was inducted into the IIHF Hall of Fame in 2016.

== Early life ==
Bondra was born on 7 February 1968 in Bakivtsi, Lutsk Raion, Ukraine, which was then a part of the Soviet Union. Bondra's father (a Slovak) had moved to Lutsk from Jakubany, Czechoslovakia, when he was 16, and where he met his wife (a Pole). The parents moved with Peter and his two older brothers, Juraj and Vladimír, to Poprad, Czechoslovakia when Peter was three years old. His father died in 1982.

Bondra was a Soviet citizen when he arrived in the United States, later obtaining a Slovak passport and citizenship in 1993 before the start of the 1994 Winter Olympics qualifying tournament.

== Playing career ==
=== Czechoslovak leagues (1986–1990) ===
Bondra played one season for HK Poprad in the lower ranks of Czechoslovak league competition and transferred to VSŽ Košice in the First Division at the age of 18 in 1986. His older brother Juraj also played there on defense, having already won one championship title with the team the year before. As early as his second season with Košice, Peter was considered one of the top shooters in the Czechoslovak league, and won the league championship together with his brother in 1988. It was longtime Washington Capitals scout Jack Button who spotted Bondra (then in his fourth season in 1989) while scouting the team that got him to convince team GM David Poile to draft Bondra and approach him about playing for them.

=== Washington Capitals (1990–2004) ===
Bondra was drafted by the Washington Capitals in the 1990 NHL entry draft as the 156th overall pick, and he made the team out of training camp with no time spent in the minor leagues. Due to the language barrier, he became good friends with Ukrainian-born Capitals player Dmitri Khristich, with whom he conversed in both Russian and Ukrainian. The right winger in Bondra was paired alongside fellow Slovak Michal Pivoňka at center that saw them team up for six full seasons and 723 combined points together from 1990 to 1996. Bondra scored his first NHL goal on 17 October 1990 when he scored on Chris Terreri of the New Jersey Devils. On 5 February 1994, Bondra scored five goals against the Tampa Bay Lightning at the USAir Arena, doing so in a span of 24 minutes (he holds the record for the fastest three, fastest four and fastest five goals in a game). He was the first Capital to have a five-goal game since Bengt-Åke Gustafsson; no Capitals player has had five goals in a game since Bondra.

The 1994–95 season saw a lockout shorten the season to 48 games, but Bondra excelled with 34 goals (with 23 of them in the final 21 games) to lead the league for the first time. As a restricted free agent, Bondra spent the start of the 1995–96 season unsigned, as he wanted a four-year deal for $7.5 million while Washington offered him a five-year deal for $6.25 million. Alongside Michal Pivonka, Bondra signed a one-year contract with an escape clause to play with the Detroit Vipers of the International Hockey League. He ultimately signed a deal to return to the team in October. Playing in just 67 games due to the holdout and a shoulder injury, he scored 52 goals.

1997 saw the pairing of Bondra with Adam Oates that saw them combine for 535 points in four seasons together at center and right wing. His deepest playoff run came in the 1997–98 season. That year, he led the league in goals with 52 as the Capitals reached the 1998 Stanley Cup playoffs. Bondra sprained his ankle in Game 1 of the opening round and was limited in Game 2 that saw him sit out the next three games but returned in time for the second round, and in the Conference Finals versus the Buffalo Sabres, Bondra scored the game-winning OT goal in Game 3 before scoring the tying goal in Game 6 that the Capitals eventually won in overtime to win the series and advance to the Stanley Cup Final for the first time in franchise history. In the Final, Bondra was limited to one goal (in Game 2) and one assist as the Capitals were swept by the Detroit Red Wings; in total, Bondra had seven goals (tied for the most among the team) and five assists in 17 playoff games, with the goals and points being postseason highs for his career. Bondra missed a handful of games in the 1999–2000 season due to arthroscopic knee surgery in December 1999 but scored 21 goals in 62 games. In his first ten seasons in the NHL from 1990 to 2000, Bondra scored 337 goals, tenth most for all players that played in that same time.

Bondra and the Capitals agreed to a four-year contract extension worth $18 million on 1 February 2001 and that night, he had a hat trick in the second period against the Toronto Maple Leafs. In the only season where he played in every game of the season (82 games), Bondra had 45 goals and 36 assists for 81 points while leading the league with 22 power-play goals. On 30 November of the 2001–02 season, Bondra passed Mike Gartner in goals scored as a Capital with his 398th, which came against the Carolina Hurricanes in Washington. On 4 December against the New York Rangers, he became the fifth active player to score 400 goals with one team, doing so with a two-goal night at home. He had 39 goals and 31 assists in 77 games while leading the league in power-play goals with 17. In the 2002–03 season, Bondra became the all-time points leader in Capitals history, doing so with two goals in the third period against the Pittsburgh Penguins on 5 April 2003 to pass Gartner's record of 789 points to reach 790 for a career (451 goals, 339 assists). He finished with 30 goals on the season for his ninth 30-goal season, making him of 39 players with nine 30-goal seasons. In the 2003–04 season, Bondra's 14th with Washington, the Capitals endured a disappointing year and in a salary purge move traded veteran members of the team to contenders. As a result, Bondra was traded to the Ottawa Senators for Brooks Laich (who ultimately played with Washington until 2016) and a second-round draft pick. At the press conference announcing this trade, Bondra notably broke into tears.

In fourteen years with the Capitals, Bondra scored 472 goals and racked up 353 assists in 961 games. He holds the Capitals team records in short-handed goals (32). With Washington, he appeared in five All-Star Games (1993, 1996, 1997, 1998 and 1999). In 1997 and 1999, Bondra won the Fastest Skater Competition on All-Star weekend. In 2004, the Capitals held a vote for fans to determine the top 30 players in franchise history to celebrate their 30th season in the league. Bondra finished second with 2,018 votes. The winner, Olaf Kölzig, beat him by only 20 votes. Bondra was also selected as a member of the 40th and 50th Anniversary teams in 2014 and 2024.

=== Ottawa, Atlanta, Chicago (2004–2007) ===
Bondra had a goal in his first game with the Senators on 19 February but ultimately struggled with the team down the stretch. In 23 games spent with the Senators, Bondra had five goals and nine assists, which saw him go through a dry spell of goals; his goal scored on 6 March was the last one he scored until 2 April. In the Eastern Conference quarterfinals matchup against the Toronto Maple Leafs, Bondra recorded no goals or assists despite playing 116 total minutes in the series, which the Senators lost in seven games.

With the 2004–05 NHL season seeming doomed by January 2005 due to the NHL labor dispute, Bondra signed with the HK Tatravagónka ŠKP Poprad of the Slovak Extraliga, ultimately playing a handful of games with the team. Prior to the 2005–06 season, Bondra was in talks to rejoin the Capitals, although he ended up signing with the Atlanta Thrashers for one season for $505,000. Bondra was put on injured reserve in December with a strained groin that saw him return in the last week of February. He scored 21 goals in sixty games to achieve his 14th consecutive 20-goal season, which made him one of 29 players at the time with at least fourteen 20-goal seasons in NHL history; he also became the 13th player with 14 consecutive 20-goal seasons in NHL history. On 10 December 2006, Bondra (with 498 career goals) signed a one-year contract with the Chicago Blackhawks in an effort designed to boost their goalscoring. On 22 December 2006, he scored his 500th NHL career goal at the United Center, in Chicago's 3–1 victory against the Toronto Maple Leafs. Bondra drove to the net and netted the rebound of Jassen Cullimore's shot from the left point past Toronto's Jean-Sébastien Aubin, 6:37 into the third period on the power play. Bondra was the 37th player in league history to reach the 500-goal mark and the fourth player to record his 500th goal in a Blackhawks sweater, joining Bobby Hull, Stan Mikita and Michel Goulet. He had five goals and 14 points in 37 games for the Blackhawks that season. On 29 October 2007, Bondra announced his retirement from professional hockey at the age of 39.

== Legacy ==
Bondra was the first Capitals player to have led the NHL in goals scored (doing so in the 1994–95 and 1997–98 seasons) which was prior to the NHL awarding the goal leader with the Maurice "Rocket" Richard Trophy. He was the only leading goal scorer from Washington until Alexander Ovechkin won the Trophy in 2008, and he surpassed Bondra in leading goal seasons with his third in 2013. Ovechkin later surpassed Bondra in points in 2014 and in goals in 2015. Bondra remains the last Capitals player with a five goal game. In the timeframe of his career from 1990 to 2007, Bondra was seventh in goals scored. Bondra recorded 32 short-handed goals in his career, 18th most in NHL history and seventh most among all 500-goal scorers. He also had 19 games with a hat trick, fourth most among all players in his career timespan. He was inducted into the IIHF Hall of Fame in 2016 and the Washington DC Sports Hall of Fame in 2018.

In 2017, he was hired by the Capitals as Director of Alumni Affairs & Business Development, which saw him work as director of the Washington Capitals Alumni Association. When asked in 2019 about the Hockey Hall of Fame and not having had his jersey retired by Washington, Bondra had no bitterness, expressing his gratitude for the career he had in the NHL.

== International play ==
Medal record

Representing Slovakia

Men's ice hockey

World Championships
Gold medal – first place	2002 Sweden	
Bronze medal – third place	2003 Finland	

Bondra represented Slovakia on seven occasions in international competition, including the 1994 Winter Olympics qualifying tournament, the 1998 Winter Olympics, the 2006 Winter Olympics, the 1996 World Cup of Hockey and the Ice Hockey World Championship in 2002 and 2003. He scored a tournament-leading seven goals (including the tournament-winning goal) and ranked third among all players with nine points to lead Slovakia 4–3 over Russia to the gold medal at the 2002 World Championship. He notched five points (three goals, two assists) in eight games to help Slovakia earn the bronze medal at the 2003 World Championship. Overall, he played 47 games and scored 35 goals for Slovakia. He served as general manager of the Slovakia team for the 2010 Winter Olympics, which lost in the bronze medal game.

== Career statistics ==
=== Regular season and playoffs ===
			Regular season					Playoffs
Season	Team	League	GP	G	A	Pts	PIM	GP	G	A	Pts	PIM
1986–87	TJ VSŽ Košice	ČSSR	25	3	4	7	24	7	1	1	2	—
1987–88	TJ VSŽ Košice	ČSSR	45	27	11	38	20	—	—	—	—	—
1988–89	TJ VSŽ Košice	ČSSR	32	27	10	37	20	8	3	0	3	—
1989–90	TJ VSŽ Košice	ČSSR	44	29	17	46	—	5	7	2	9	—
1990–91	Washington Capitals	NHL	54	12	16	28	47	4	0	1	1	2
1991–92	Washington Capitals	NHL	71	28	28	56	42	7	6	2	8	4
1992–93	Washington Capitals	NHL	83	37	48	85	70	6	0	6	6	0
1993–94	Washington Capitals	NHL	69	24	19	43	40	9	2	4	6	4
1994–95	HC Košice	SVK	2	1	0	1	0	—	—	—	—	—
1994–95	Washington Capitals	NHL	47	34	9	43	24	7	5	3	8	10
1995–96	Washington Capitals	NHL	67	52	28	80	40	6	3	2	5	8
1995–96	Detroit Vipers	IHL	7	8	1	9	0	—	—	—	—	—
1996–97	Washington Capitals	NHL	77	46	31	77	72	—	—	—	—	—
1997–98	Washington Capitals	NHL	76	52	26	78	44	17	7	5	12	12
1998–99	Washington Capitals	NHL	66	31	24	55	56	—	—	—	—	—
1999–2000	Washington Capitals	NHL	62	21	17	38	30	5	1	1	2	4
2000–01	Washington Capitals	NHL	82	45	36	81	60	6	2	0	2	2
2001–02	Washington Capitals	NHL	77	39	31	70	80	—	—	—	—	—
2002–03	Washington Capitals	NHL	76	30	26	56	52	6	4	2	6	8
2003–04	Washington Capitals	NHL	54	21	14	35	22	—	—	—	—	—
2003–04	Ottawa Senators	NHL	23	5	9	14	16	7	0	0	0	6
2004–05	HK Tatravagónka ŠKP Poprad	SVK	6	4	2	6	4	—	—	—	—	—
2005–06	Atlanta Thrashers	NHL	60	21	18	39	40	—	—	—	—	—
2006–07	Chicago Blackhawks	NHL	37	5	9	14	14	—	—	—	—	—
ČSSR totals			151	93	45	138	64	20	11	3	14	—
NHL totals			1,081	503	389	892	749	80	30	26	56	60

=== International ===
Year	Team	Event	Result	GP	G	A	Pts	PIM
1996	Slovakia	WCH	7th	3	3	0	3	2
1998	Slovakia	OG	10th	2	1	0	1	25
2002	Slovakia	WC	1st place, gold medalist(s)	9	7	2	9	20
2003	Slovakia	WC	3rd place, bronze medalist(s)	8	3	2	5	6
2006	Slovakia	OG	5th	6	4	0	4	2
Senior totals				28	18	4	22	55

== Awards and honours ==
Award	Year
NHL
All-Star Game	1993, 1996, 1997, 1998, 1999
IIHF
All-Star Team	2002
IIHF Hall of Fame	2016

== Personal life ==
After living in Crofton, Maryland, Bondra resides in Riva with his wife Luba. They have three children:daughter Petra and sons David and Nick. He has participated in multiple alumni games and appearances with the current Capitals organization.

== See also ==
- List of NHL players with 1,000 games played
- List of NHL players with 500 goals
- List of players with five or more goals in an NHL game

Awards and achievements
Preceded by Pavel Bure	NHL goal leader 1995	Succeeded by Mario Lemieux
Preceded by Keith Tkachuk	NHL goal leader 1998; With: Teemu Selänne	Succeeded by Teemu Selänne
