= Dick Butler (ice hockey) =

Canadian ice hockey player

- Born: June 2, 1926 Delisle, Saskatchewan, Canada
- Died: June 20, 2000 (aged 74)
- Height: 5 ft 7 in (170 cm)
- Weight: 175 lb (79 kg; 12 st 7 lb)
- Position: Right wing
- Shot: Right
- Played for: Chicago Black Hawks
- Playing career: 1946–1954

John Richard Butler (June 2, 1926 — June 20, 2000) was a Canadian professional ice hockey right wing who played seven games in the National Hockey League with the Chicago Black Hawks during the 1947–48 season. The rest of his career, which lasted from 1946 to 1954, was spent in various minor leagues.

Butler was born in Delisle, Saskatchewan. He played junior hockey for the Trail Smoke Eaters and the Moose Jaw Canucks. In 1946, Butler became a professional with the Kansas City Pla-Mors. The following season, Butler played seven games with the Black Hawks. It was his only NHL experience. Butler would continue in minor and senior hockey until 1958.

== Career statistics ==
=== Regular season and playoffs ===
			Regular season					Playoffs
Season	Team	League	GP	G	A	Pts	PIM	GP	G	A	Pts	PIM
1945–46	Moose Jaw Canucks	SSJHL	—	—	—	—	—	—	—	—	—	—
1946–47	Kansas City Pla-Mors	USHL	59	19	39	58	48	12	7	1	8	13
1947–48	Kansas City Pla-Mors	USHL	49	16	22	38	26	7	1	2	3	2
1947–58	Chicago Black Hawks	NHL	7	2	0	2	0	—	—	—	—	—
1948–49	Tulsa Oilers	USHL	57	42	41	83	35	7	2	5	7	0
1948–49	Hershey Bears	AHL	6	1	0	1	0	—	—	—	—	—
1949–50	Tulsa Oilers	USHL	70	37	36	73	22	—	—	—	—	—
1950–51	Tulsa Oilers	USHL	61	23	27	50	13	9	0	5	5	6
1951–52	Calgary Stampeders	PCHL	13	2	2	4	21	—	—	—	—	—
1953–54	Vernon Canadians	OSAHL	—	—	—	—	—	—	—	—	—	—
USHL totals			296	137	165	302	144	35	10	13	23	21
NHL totals			7	2	0	2	0	—	—	—	—	—
