= Delisle, Saskatchewan =

Town in Saskatchewan, Canada

Delisle
- Town
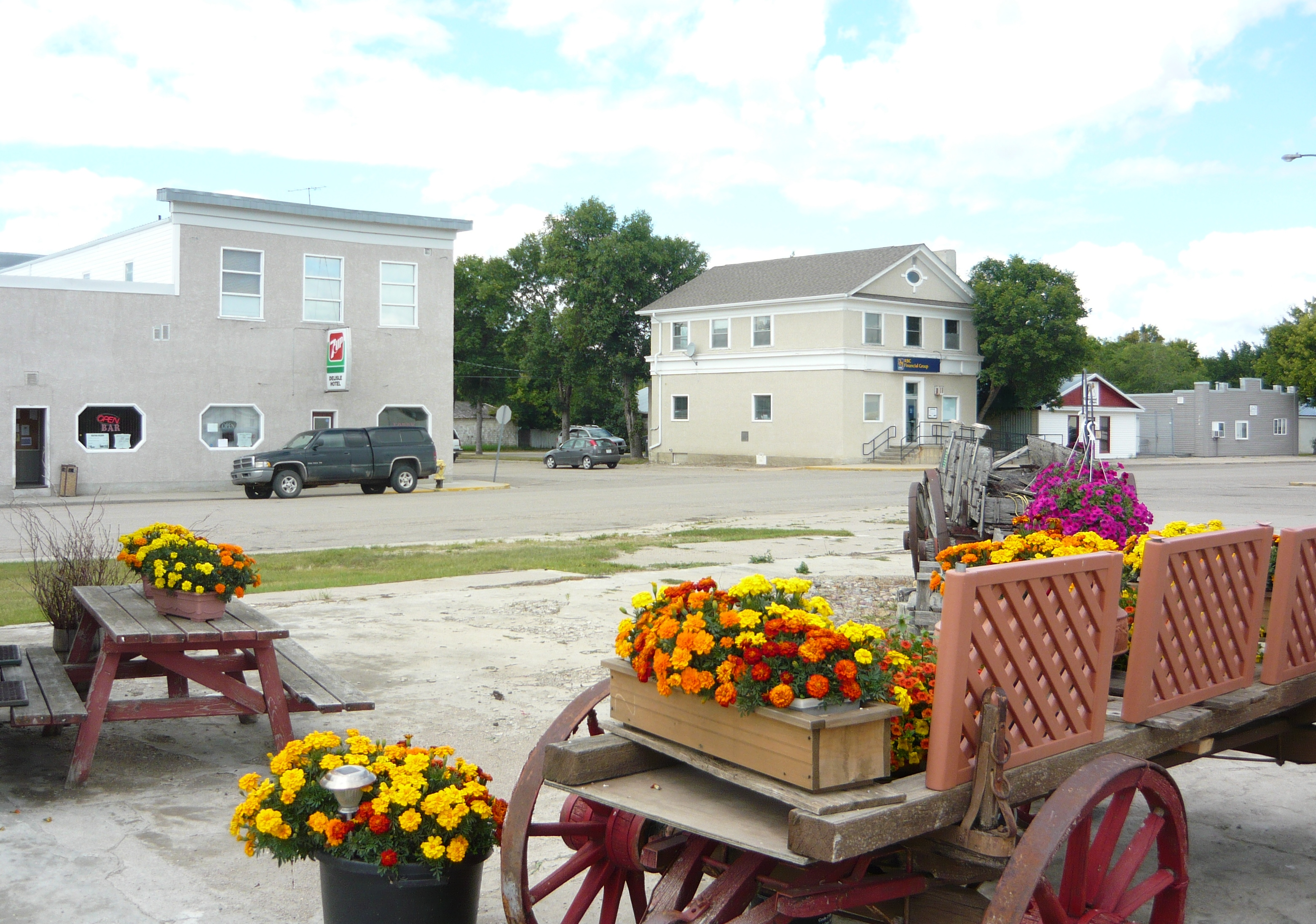
- Delisle's Business District

- Location of Delisle in Saskatchewan Delisle (Canada)
- Coordinates: 51°55′32″N 107°08′00″W
- Country: Canada
- Province: Saskatchewan
- Founded: 1907
- Town Incorporated: 1913

Government
  - Mayor: Max Coben
  - Governing body: Delisle Town Council

Area
  - Land: 3.35 km^{2} (1.29 sq mi)

Population (2016)
  - Total: 1,038
  - Density: 310.2/km^{2} (803/sq mi)
- Time zone: UTC−6 (CST)
- Postal code: S0L 0P0
- Area code: 306
- Highways: Highway 7
- Website: townofdelisle.com

Delisle (/dəˈlaɪl/) is a town in south central Saskatchewan, Canada. It is 45 kilometres (28 mi) southwest of Saskatoon beside Highway 7.

== History ==
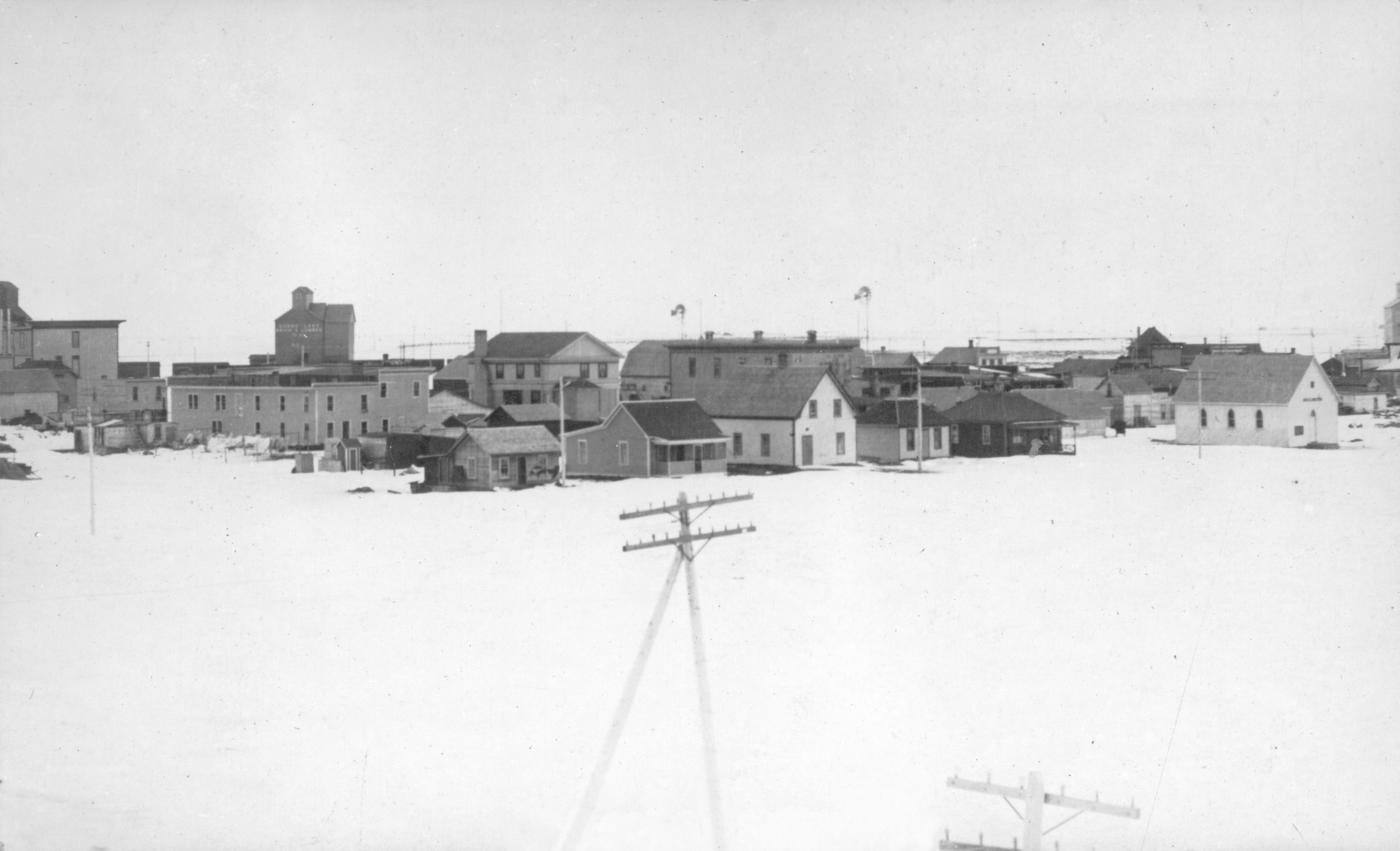
Delisle, circa 1910

The origins of the town go back to its original settlement on the Old Bone Trail. It derived its name from the DeLisle family. Lenora DeLisle and her four sons Amos, Fred, Ed and Eugene came from North Dakota, United States, in 1903 and homesteaded on the land 3 miles (4.8 km) south of the present-day townsite. With the coming of the Canadian Northern Railway's line from Saskatoon to Calgary, Alberta, in 1908 the settlement to the south moved to the new townsite. The town was named after the brothers on 29 December 1908. Delisle was named a town in 1913.

== Sights ==
A cenotaph stands in the heart of Delisle in front of the old hospital. On it are inscribed the names of those from Delisle and surrounding area who died in the two world wars. In 2002 the cenotaph was refurbished and rededicated. The service included a small parade consisting of Girl Guides, Boy Scouts, Sparks, elementary school children, the complement of HMCS Unicorn, and the RCSCC Jervis Bay Ship's Band leading the way from the Centennial Arena to the cenotaph.

The town has a nine-hole grass green golf course (Valleyview Golf Course).

== Education ==
The town supports one of the largest high schools in the Prairie Spirit School Division bringing in students from smaller, nearby villages and hamlets such as Laura, Kinley, Donavon, Swanson, Vanscoy, and the Pike Lake district, as well as rural students. It has a nine-man football team (Delisle Rebels) that has won several provincial titles; a track and field team that competes well for top spots in provincials and holds records for countless events; a soccer team that won provincials in 2009; and a drama program, that while in decline in recent years, has often performed well at large drama festivals. The school also contributes the most players for the Prairie Spirit (West) Band Program.

== Demographics ==
In the 2021 Census of Population conducted by Statistics Canada, Delisle had a population of 1,024 living in 427 of its 462 total private dwellings, a change of −1.3% from its 2016 population of 1,038. With a land area of 3.33 km^{2} (1.29 sq mi), it had a population density of 307.5/km^{2} (796.4/sq mi) in 2021.

Canada census – Delisle community profile

	2021	2016	2011
Population	1,024 (-1.3% from 2016)	1,038 (6.5% from 2011)	975 (+8.6% from 2006)
Land area	3.33 km^{2} (1.29 sq mi)	3.35 km^{2} (1.29 sq mi)	2.49 km^{2} (0.96 sq mi)
Population density	307.5/km^{2} (796/sq mi)	310.2/km^{2} (803/sq mi)	391.3/km^{2} (1,013/sq mi)
Median age	38.4 (M: 37.6, F: 39.2)	37.7 (M: 36.1, F: 39.2)	36.7 (M: 35.0, F: 37.5)
Private dwellings	462 (total) 427 (occupied)	438 (total)	414 (total)
Median household income	$84,000

References: 2021 2016 2011

== Notable people ==
- Doug Bentley, ice hockey winger and Hockey Hall of Fame member
- Max Bentley, ice hockey centre and Hockey Hall of Fame member
- Reg Bentley, ice hockey winger
- Bev Bentley, ice hockey goaltender
- Dick Butler, ice hockey winger
- Jack Miller, ice hockey winger
- Jack Norris, ice hockey goaltender

== Media ==
Delisle was the setting for the Canadian modern day hockey movie Paperback Hero.

Delisle is considered part of the greater Saskatoon region and as such has direct access to most of its print, radio, and television media.

== See also ==
- List of towns in Saskatchewan
