= Alberta Senior Hockey League (1936–1941) =

Senior level ice hockey league in Canada

- Classification: Senior
- Sport: Ice hockey
- Founded: 1936
- Folded: 1941
- No. of teams: 4-7
- Country: Canada

The Alberta Senior Hockey League or ASHL was a senior level ice hockey league that operated between 1936 and 1941 in Alberta, Canada. In 1941 the league ceased operations due to World War II.

After the ASHL folded, some teams went on to join the Western Canada Senior Hockey League (WCSHL) while other teams merged with the West Kootenay League to become the Alberta-British Columbia Senior League for the 1941-42 season.

== Teams ==
- Calgary Bronks (1936–1937)
- Calgary Rangers (1936–1938)
- Drumheller Miners (1936–1941)
- Edmonton Dominions (1936–1938)
- Edmonton Superiors (1936–1938)
- Olds Elks (1936–1941)
- Calgary Stampeders (1938–1941)
- Coleman Canadians (1938–1941)
- Edmonton Eskimos (1938–1939)
- Lethbridge Maple Leafs (1938–1941)
- Turner Valley Oilers (1938–1941)
- Edmonton Flyers (1939–1941)

== Notable players ==
The Drumheller Miners, the only ASHL team to play in all five years of the league's existence, featured the five Bentley brothers – Doug, Max, Reg, Roy and Wyatt. Doug, Max and Reg went on to play in the National Hockey League (NHL), while Doug and Max were both elected into the Hockey Hall of Fame.

Alex Kaleta, who played for the Calgary Stampeders and Lethbridge Maple Leafs, would go on to compete in the NHL and is known for his part in originating hockey's hat trick tradition while with the Chicago Black Hawks.
