= Reg Bentley =

Canadian ice hockey player (1914–1980)

- Born: May 3, 1914 Delisle, Saskatchewan, Canada
- Died: September 1, 1980 (aged 66) Red Deer, Alberta, Canada
- Height: 5 ft 8 in (173 cm)
- Weight: 155 lb (70 kg; 11 st 1 lb)
- Position: Left wing
- Shot: Left
- Played for: Chicago Black Hawks
- Playing career: 1931–1952

Reginald Stewart Bentley (May 3, 1914 – September 1, 1980) was a Canadian ice hockey player who played 11 games in the National Hockey League (NHL) for the Chicago Black Hawks as part of a 20-year senior and professional career. During his time with Chicago, he played on a line with his brothers Doug and Max, the first time in NHL history that three siblings played on one line.

== Personal life ==
Bentley was born in Delisle, Saskatchewan. He was one of six boys, and thirteen children overall. His father Bill was a speed skating champion in North Dakota before settling in Delisle, where he became mayor and helped build the town's covered skating rink. All of the Bentley children were athletes, and all six brothers played hockey.

== Playing career ==
Bentley first played senior hockey in his hometown of Delisle for the Tigers hockey team in 1931–32 and 1932–33 before moving to nearby Kerrobert for two years of intermediate hockey, and then to Saskatoon and Moose Jaw for two seasons each in the North- and South-Saskatchewan Senior Hockey Leagues respectively. He moved across the border to Alberta in 1938–39, joining his brothers Doug, Max, Wyatt and Roy in playing with the Drumheller Miners of the Alberta Senior Hockey League (ASHL).

World War II had decimated the rosters of all NHL teams, and with the Black Hawks searching for players, Max and Doug Bentley convinced the team to sign Reg. Bentley played his first professional season in 1941–42 for Chicago's American Hockey Association (AHA) affiliate, the Kansas City Americans. Reg joined the Black Hawks midway through the 1942–43 season, and the trio made history on January 1, 1943, when they became the first all-brother line the NHL had seen. Two nights later, Max and Doug assisted on Reg's first, and only, NHL goal. It was the only time in league history that a trio of family members recorded the goal and assists on a scoring play. While Max and Doug were established NHL stars, Reg played only 11 games in his NHL career.

Bentley left professional hockey following that season to join the Canadian military for the balance of the war. He was stationed in Victoria and Calgary, where he played for Navy and Army teams. In 1945, he returned to professional hockey, joining the New Westminster Royals of the Pacific Coast Hockey League (PCHL) for two seasons. He set personal bests in 1946–47 with 41 goals and 71 points for the Royals. He returned to senior hockey in 1947, joining the Saskatoon Quakers of the Western Canada Senior Hockey League (WCSHL) for four seasons. He was loaned by the Quakers to the Spokane Flyers of the Western International Hockey League (WIHL) for their 1949 playoff final as an injury replacement. He joined his brother Wyatt ("Scoop") with the Flyers. Bentley scored four goals in the series, including the insurance marker in a 2–0 victory over the Kimberley Dynamiters to help the Flyers win the best-of-five championship in four games.

He died after a long illness at a hospital in Red Deer in 1980.

== Career statistics ==
=== Regular season and playoffs ===
| | | | Regular season | | | | | Playoffs |
| Season | Team | League | GP | G | A | Pts | PIM | GP | G | A | Pts | PIM |
|---|---|---|---|---|---|---|---|---|---|---|---|---|
| 1931–32 | Delisle Tigers | S-SSHL | 20 | 5 | 4 | 9 | 2 | 2 | 0 | 0 | 0 | 2 |
| 1932–33 | Delisle Tigers | S-SSHL | — | — | — | — | — | 2 | 0 | 0 | 0 | 2 |
| 1935–36 | Saskatoon Standards | N-SSHL | 19 | 7 | 0 | 7 | 16 | — | — | — | — | — |
| 1936–37 | Saskatoon Quakers | N-SSHL | 20 | 7 | 2 | 9 | 4 | — | — | — | — | — |
| 1937–38 | Moose Jaw Millers | N-SSHL | 24 | 14 | 9 | 23 | 14 | 10 | 10 | 4 | 14 | 8 |
| 1938–39 | Drumheller Miners | ASHL | 32 | 21 | 10 | 31 | 52 | 6 | 4 | 1 | 5 | 9 |
| 1939–40 | Drumheller Miners | ASHL | 32 | 23 | 8 | 31 | 27 | — | — | — | — | — |
| 1940–41 | Saskatoon Quakers | SSHL | 30 | 14 | 5 | 19 | 2 | 4 | 0 | 0 | 0 | 0 |
| 1941–42 | Kansas City Americans | AHA | 50 | 16 | 16 | 32 | 16 | 6 | 3 | 4 | 7 | 0 |
| 1942–43 | Chicago Black Hawks | NHL | 11 | 1 | 2 | 3 | 2 | — | — | — | — | — |
| 1943–44 | Calgary Currie Army | CNDHL | 14 | 7 | 2 | 9 | 6 | 2 | 0 | 0 | 0 | 0 |
| 1943–44 | Moose Jaw Victorias | SSHL | 2 | 2 | 3 | 5 | 0 | — | — | — | — | — |
| 1944–45 | Calgary Currie Army | CNDHL | 10 | 1 | 1 | 2 | 2 | 2 | 0 | 1 | 1 | 0 |
| 1945–46 | New Westminster Royals | PCHL | 57 | 30 | 27 | 57 | 18 | — | — | — | — | — |
| 1946–47 | New Westminster Royals | PCHL | 60 | 41 | 30 | 71 | 14 | 4 | 2 | 1 | 3 | 0 |
| 1947–48 | Saskatoon Quakers | WCSHL | 45 | 28 | 22 | 50 | 17 | — | — | — | — | — |
| 1948–49 | Saskatoon Quakers | WCSHL | 48 | 22 | 18 | 40 | 4 | — | — | — | — | — |
| 1948–49 | Spokane Flyers | WIHL | — | — | — | — | — | 4 | 4 | 3 | 7 | 0 |
| 1949–50 | Saskatoon Quakers | WCSHL | 50 | 15 | 14 | 29 | 14 | 4 | 1 | 0 | 1 | 0 |
| 1950–51 | Saskatoon Quakers | WCSHL | 40 | 12 | 13 | 25 | 8 | 8 | 2 | 1 | 3 | 0 |
| 1951–52 | Yorkton Legionnaires | SSHL | 30 | 20 | 23 | 43 | 4 | 7 | 3 | 5 | 8 | 0 |
| NHL totals | | | 11 | 1 | 2 | 3 | 2 | 0 | 0 | 0 | 0 | 0 |

== See also ==
- List of family relations in the NHL
