= List of past NHL scoring leaders =

The following are lists showing the point- and goal-scoring leaders of the National Hockey League before the league issued trophies for such achievements. The point-scoring leader has been awarded the Art Ross Trophy since the 1947–48 NHL season, and the goal-scoring leader has been awarded the Maurice "Rocket" Richard Trophy since the 1998–99 NHL season.

== NHL point-scoring leaders (1918–1947) ==
These are the point-scoring leaders of the NHL from the league's first season (1917–18) until the 1946–47 season. Beginning with the 1947–48 NHL season, the point scoring leader was awarded the Art Ross Trophy.

| Season | Winner | Team | Points | Win # |
|---|---|---|---|---|
| 1917–18 | Joe Malone | Montreal Canadiens | 48 | 1 |
| 1918–19 | Newsy Lalonde | Montreal Canadiens | 32 | 1 |
| 1919–20 | Joe Malone | Quebec Bulldogs | 49 | 2 |
| 1920–21 | Newsy Lalonde | Montreal Canadiens | 43 | 2 |
| 1921–22 | Punch Broadbent | Ottawa Senators | 46 | 1 |
| 1922–23 | Babe Dye | Toronto St. Pats | 37 | 1 |
| 1923–24 | Cy Denneny | Ottawa Senators | 24 | 1 |
| 1924–25 | Babe Dye | Toronto St. Pats | 44 | 2 |
| 1925–26 | Nels Stewart | Montreal Maroons | 42 | 1 |
| 1926–27 | Bill Cook | New York Rangers | 37 | 1 |
| 1927–28 | Howie Morenz | Montreal Canadiens | 51 | 1 |
| 1928–29 | Ace Bailey | Toronto Maple Leafs | 32 | 1 |
| 1929–30 | Cooney Weiland | Boston Bruins | 73 | 1 |
| 1930–31 | Howie Morenz | Montreal Canadiens | 51 | 2 |
| 1931–32 | Harvey Jackson | Toronto Maple Leafs | 53 | 1 |
| 1932–33 | Bill Cook | New York Rangers | 50 | 2 |
| 1933–34 | Charlie Conacher | Toronto Maple Leafs | 52 | 1 |
| 1934–35 | Charlie Conacher | Toronto Maple Leafs | 57 | 2 |
| 1935–36 | Sweeney Schriner | New York Americans | 45 | 1 |
| 1936–37 | Sweeney Schriner | New York Americans | 46 | 2 |
| 1937–38 | Gordie Drillon | Toronto Maple Leafs | 52 | 1 |
| 1938–39 | Toe Blake | Montreal Canadiens | 47 | 1 |
| 1939–40 | Milt Schmidt | Boston Bruins | 52 | 1 |
| 1940–41 | Bill Cowley | Boston Bruins | 62 | 1 |
| 1941–42 | Bryan Hextall | New York Rangers | 56 | 1 |
| 1942–43 | Doug Bentley | Chicago Black Hawks | 73 | 1 |
| 1943–44 | Herb Cain | Boston Bruins | 82 | 1 |
| 1944–45 | Elmer Lach | Montreal Canadiens | 80 | 1 |
| 1945–46 | Max Bentley | Chicago Black Hawks | 61 | 1 |
| 1946–47 | Max Bentley | Chicago Black Hawks | 72 | 2 |

== NHL goal-scoring leaders (1918–1998) ==
These are the goal-scoring leaders of the NHL from the league's first season (1917–18) until the 1997–98 season. Beginning with the 1998–99 NHL season, the goal-scoring leader was awarded the Maurice "Rocket" Richard Trophy.

| = 5-time (or more) winners |

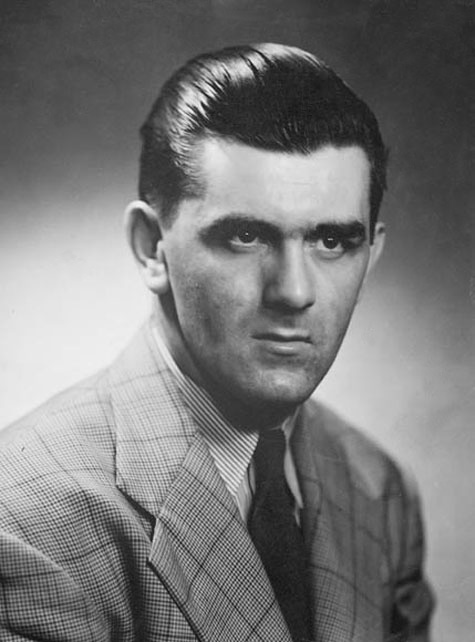
Maurice Richard, the namesake for the current trophy, was the NHL's leading goal scorer five times

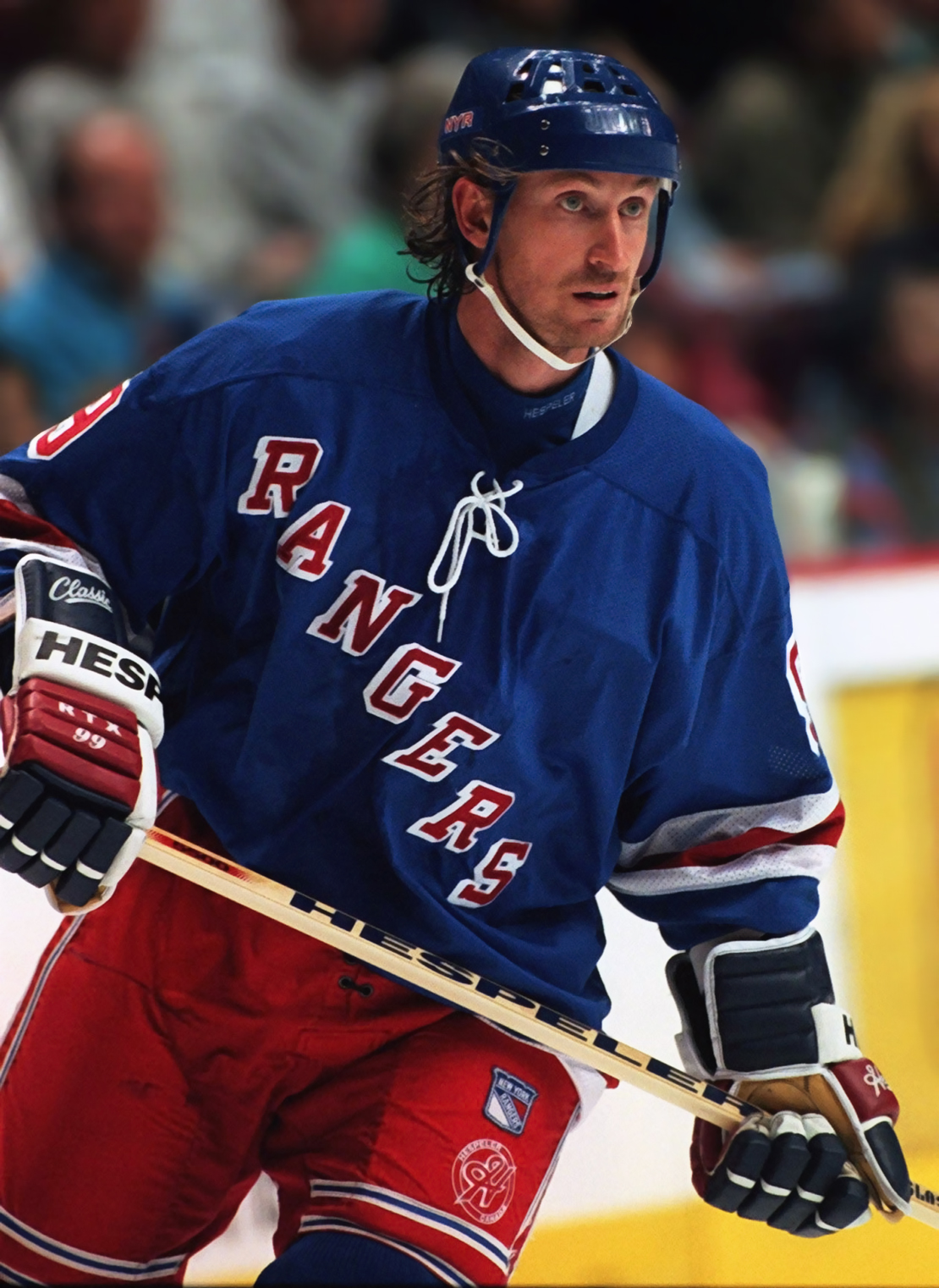
Wayne Gretzky, five-time leading scorer

| Season | Winner | Team | Goals | Win # |
|---|---|---|---|---|
| 1917–18 | Joe Malone | Montreal Canadiens | 44 | 1 |
| 1918–19 | Odie Cleghorn | Montreal Canadiens | 23 | 1 |
| 1918–19 | Newsy Lalonde | Montreal Canadiens | 23 | 1 |
| 1919–20 | Joe Malone | Quebec Bulldogs | 39 | 2 |
| 1920–21 | Babe Dye | Hamilton Tigers/Toronto St. Patricks | 35 | 1 |
| 1921–22 | Punch Broadbent | Ottawa Senators | 31 | 1 |
| 1921–22 | Babe Dye | Toronto St. Patricks | 31 | 2 |
| 1922–23 | Babe Dye | Toronto St. Patricks | 26 | 3 |
| 1923–24 | Cy Denneny | Ottawa Senators | 22 | 1 |
| 1924–25 | Babe Dye | Toronto St. Patricks | 38 | 4 |
| 1925–26 | Nels Stewart | Montreal Maroons | 34 | 1 |
| 1926–27 | Bill Cook | New York Rangers | 33 | 1 |
| 1927–28 | Howie Morenz | Montreal Canadiens | 33 | 1 |
| 1928–29 | Ace Bailey | Toronto Maple Leafs | 22 | 1 |
| 1929–30 | Cooney Weiland | Boston Bruins | 43 | 1 |
| 1930–31 | Charlie Conacher | Toronto Maple Leafs | 31 | 1 |
| 1931–32 | Charlie Conacher | Toronto Maple Leafs | 34 | 2 |
| 1931–32 | Bill Cook | New York Rangers | 34 | 2 |
| 1932–33 | Bill Cook | New York Rangers | 28 | 3 |
| 1933–34 | Charlie Conacher | Toronto Maple Leafs | 32 | 3 |
| 1934–35 | Charlie Conacher | Toronto Maple Leafs | 36 | 4 |
| 1935–36 | Charlie Conacher | Toronto Maple Leafs | 23 | 5 |
| 1935–36 | Bill Thoms | Toronto Maple Leafs | 23 | 1 |
| 1936–37 | Larry Aurie | Detroit Red Wings | 23 | 1 |
| 1936–37 | Nels Stewart | Boston Bruins/New York Americans | 23 | 2 |
| 1937–38 | Gordie Drillon | Toronto Maple Leafs | 26 | 1 |
| 1938–39 | Roy Conacher | Boston Bruins | 26 | 1 |
| 1939–40 | Bryan Hextall | New York Rangers | 24 | 1 |
| 1940–41 | Bryan Hextall | New York Rangers | 26 | 2 |
| 1941–42 | Lynn Patrick | New York Rangers | 32 | 1 |
| 1942–43 | Doug Bentley | Chicago Black Hawks | 33 | 1 |
| 1943–44 | Doug Bentley | Chicago Black Hawks | 38 | 2 |
| 1944–45 | Maurice Richard | Montreal Canadiens | 50 | 1 |
| 1945–46 | Gaye Stewart | Toronto Maple Leafs | 37 | 1 |
| 1946–47 | Maurice Richard | Montreal Canadiens | 45 | 2 |
| 1947–48 | Ted Lindsay | Detroit Red Wings | 33 | 1 |
| 1948–49 | Sid Abel | Detroit Red Wings | 28 | 1 |
| 1949–50 | Maurice Richard | Montreal Canadiens | 43 | 3 |
| 1950–51 | Gordie Howe | Detroit Red Wings | 43 | 1 |
| 1951–52 | Gordie Howe | Detroit Red Wings | 47 | 2 |
| 1952–53 | Gordie Howe | Detroit Red Wings | 49 | 3 |
| 1953–54 | Maurice Richard | Montreal Canadiens | 37 | 4 |
| 1954–55 | Maurice Richard | Montreal Canadiens | 38 | 5 |
| 1954–55 | Bernie Geoffrion | Montreal Canadiens | 38 | 1 |
| 1955–56 | Jean Beliveau | Montreal Canadiens | 47 | 1 |
| 1956–57 | Gordie Howe | Detroit Red Wings | 44 | 4 |
| 1957–58 | Dickie Moore | Montreal Canadiens | 36 | 1 |
| 1958–59 | Jean Beliveau | Montreal Canadiens | 45 | 2 |
| 1959–60 | Bronco Horvath | Boston Bruins | 39 | 1 |
| 1959–60 | Bobby Hull | Chicago Black Hawks | 39 | 1 |
| 1960–61 | Bernie Geoffrion | Montreal Canadiens | 50 | 2 |
| 1961–62 | Bobby Hull | Chicago Black Hawks | 50 | 2 |
| 1962–63 | Gordie Howe | Detroit Red Wings | 38 | 5 |
| 1963–64 | Bobby Hull | Chicago Black Hawks | 43 | 3 |
| 1964–65 | Norm Ullman | Detroit Red Wings | 42 | 1 |
| 1965–66 | Bobby Hull | Chicago Black Hawks | 54 | 4 |
| 1966–67 | Bobby Hull | Chicago Black Hawks | 52 | 5 |
| 1967–68 | Bobby Hull | Chicago Black Hawks | 44 | 6 |
| 1968–69 | Bobby Hull | Chicago Black Hawks | 58 | 7 |
| 1969–70 | Phil Esposito | Boston Bruins | 43 | 1 |
| 1970–71 | Phil Esposito | Boston Bruins | 76 | 2 |
| 1971–72 | Phil Esposito | Boston Bruins | 66 | 3 |
| 1972–73 | Phil Esposito | Boston Bruins | 55 | 4 |
| 1973–74 | Phil Esposito | Boston Bruins | 68 | 5 |
| 1974–75 | Phil Esposito | Boston Bruins | 61 | 6 |
| 1975–76 | Reggie Leach | Philadelphia Flyers | 61 | 1 |
| 1976–77 | Steve Shutt | Montreal Canadiens | 60 | 1 |
| 1977–78 | Guy Lafleur | Montreal Canadiens | 60 | 1 |
| 1978–79 | Mike Bossy | New York Islanders | 69 | 1 |
| 1979–80 | Danny Gare | Buffalo Sabres | 56 | 1 |
| 1979–80 | Charlie Simmer | Los Angeles Kings | 56 | 1 |
| 1979–80 | Blaine Stoughton | Hartford Whalers | 56 | 1 |
| 1980–81 | Mike Bossy | New York Islanders | 68 | 2 |
| 1981–82 | Wayne Gretzky | Edmonton Oilers | 92 | 1 |
| 1982–83 | Wayne Gretzky | Edmonton Oilers | 71 | 2 |
| 1983–84 | Wayne Gretzky | Edmonton Oilers | 87 | 3 |
| 1984–85 | Wayne Gretzky | Edmonton Oilers | 73 | 4 |
| 1985–86 | Jari Kurri | Edmonton Oilers | 68 | 1 |
| 1986–87 | Wayne Gretzky | Edmonton Oilers | 62 | 5 |
| 1987–88 | Mario Lemieux | Pittsburgh Penguins | 70 | 1 |
| 1988–89 | Mario Lemieux | Pittsburgh Penguins | 85 | 2 |
| 1989–90 | Brett Hull | St. Louis Blues | 72 | 1 |
| 1990–91 | Brett Hull | St. Louis Blues | 86 | 2 |
| 1991–92 | Brett Hull | St. Louis Blues | 70 | 3 |
| 1992–93 | Alexander Mogilny | Buffalo Sabres | 76 | 1 |
| 1992–93 | Teemu Selanne | Winnipeg Jets | 76 | 1 |
| 1993–94 | Pavel Bure | Vancouver Canucks | 60 | 1 |
| 1994–95 | Peter Bondra | Washington Capitals | 34 | 1 |
| 1995–96 | Mario Lemieux | Pittsburgh Penguins | 69 | 3 |
| 1996–97 | Keith Tkachuk | Phoenix Coyotes | 52 | 1 |
| 1997–98 | Peter Bondra | Washington Capitals | 52 | 2 |
| 1997–98 | Teemu Selanne | Mighty Ducks of Anaheim | 52 | 2 |
