= Maurice "Rocket" Richard Trophy =

Ice hockey award

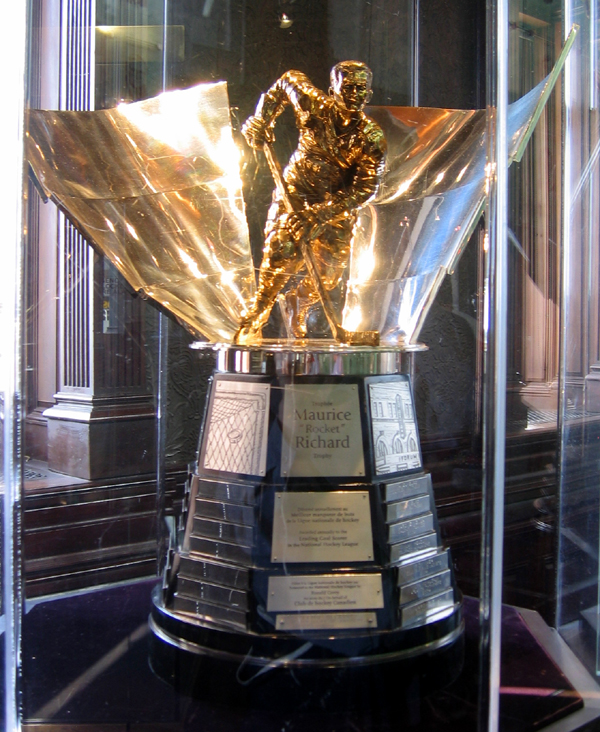
- The Richard Trophy on display at the Hockey Hall of Fame
- Sport: Ice hockey
- Awarded for: National Hockey League's top goal scorer

History
- First award: 1998–99 NHL season
- First winner: Teemu Selanne
- Most wins: Alexander Ovechkin (9)
- Most recent: Nathan MacKinnon (1); Colorado Avalanche

The Maurice "Rocket" Richard Trophy, also known as the Rocket Richard Trophy, is awarded annually to the leading goal scorer in the National Hockey League (NHL), for goals scored during the regular season and excluding the playoffs. It was donated to the NHL by the Montreal Canadiens in 1998–99 and is named in honour of legendary Montreal Canadiens right winger Maurice "Rocket" Richard. First won by Teemu Selanne, it is currently held by Nathan MacKinnon, who scored 53 goals during the 2025–26 NHL season.

== History ==
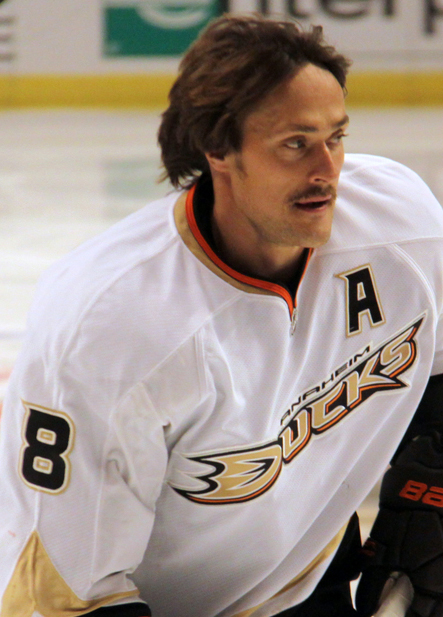
Teemu Selanne, inaugural winner of the Maurice "Rocket" Richard Trophy

The Maurice "Rocket" Richard Trophy was donated by the Montreal Canadiens to the NHL in 1999, and was first awarded at the end of the 1998–99 season. It is one of the newest of the NHL's trophies and is named in honour of the legendary right winger Maurice "Rocket" Richard, who spent his eighteen-season career with the Canadiens. He led the NHL in goal scoring five times and was the first NHL player to reach the 500-goal milestone. In 1944–45, Richard became the first player in NHL history to score 50 goals in one season, doing so in just 50 games, the latter feat achieved by only four other players since then. However, Richard never finished higher than second in points, his closest miss coming in 1954–55, when he finished one point behind teammate Bernie Geoffrion.

The winner of the Art Ross Trophy, given to the NHL's leading points scorer, often also wins the Hart Memorial Trophy as the league's most valuable player. In contrast, only Auston Matthews, Alexander Ovechkin, Corey Perry, and Connor McDavid have won both the Richard and the Hart trophies in the same season; Ovechkin has accomplished this three times, in 2007–08, 2008–09, and 2012–13. Eleven players won the Hart in the same season in which they led the league in goals before the Richard Trophy was first awarded. McDavid and Ovechkin are the only two player to have won the Hart, Rocket Richard, Art Ross and Ted Lindsay trophy in the same season. Sidney Crosby and Alexander Ovechkin are the only players to have won both the Rocket Richard and the Stanley Cup in the same season since the trophy was incepted, having done so in the 2016–17 and 2017–18 seasons, respectively.

Unlike the Art Ross Trophy, there are no tiebreakers for the Richard Trophy. As a result, it is possible for several players to share the award, such as when the 2003–04 season featured a three-way tie between 41-goal scorers Jarome Iginla, Ilya Kovalchuk, and Rick Nash. The second time there was a tie for this award was in the 2009–10 season, when both Sidney Crosby and Steven Stamkos scored 51 goals each to win this award. In the shortened 2019–20 season, there was a tie between Ovechkin and David Pastrnak, though Ovechkin played in two fewer games than Pastrnak. Rick Nash is the youngest player to have won the trophy, being 19 years old upon receipt.

Auston Matthews (third Richard Trophy in 2023–24) and Alexander Ovechkin (ninth Richard Trophy in 2019–20) are the only players to have won the trophy at least three times. Only four other players (Pavel Bure, Sidney Crosby, Jarome Iginla, and Steven Stamkos, with two trophies each) have won it more than once.

== Winners ==
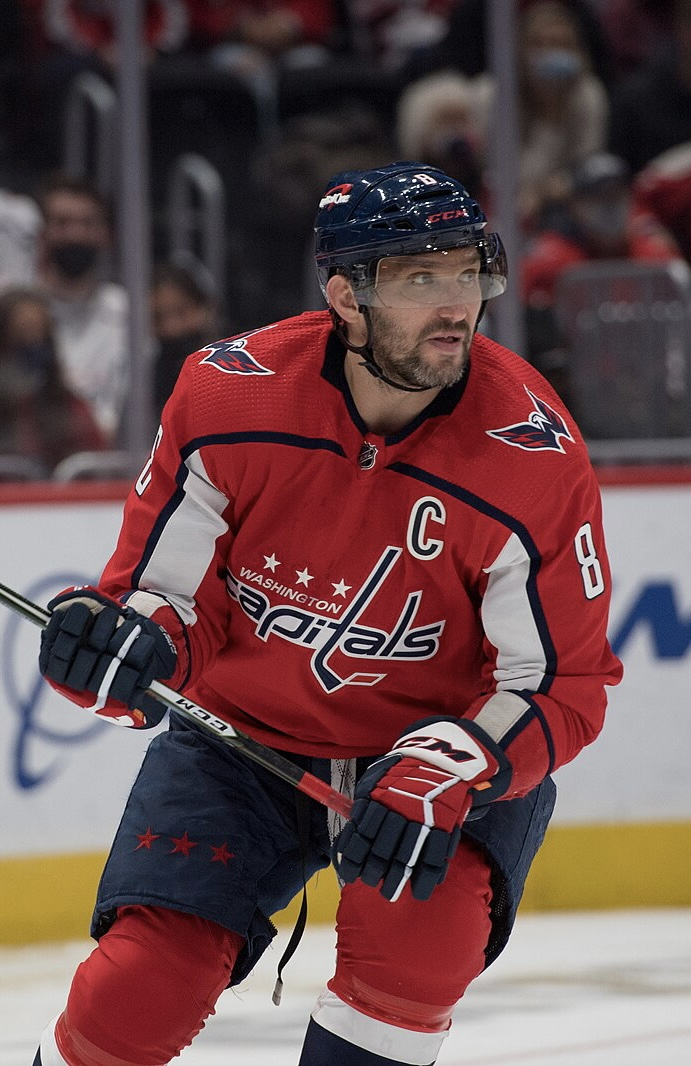
Alexander Ovechkin, record nine-time winner

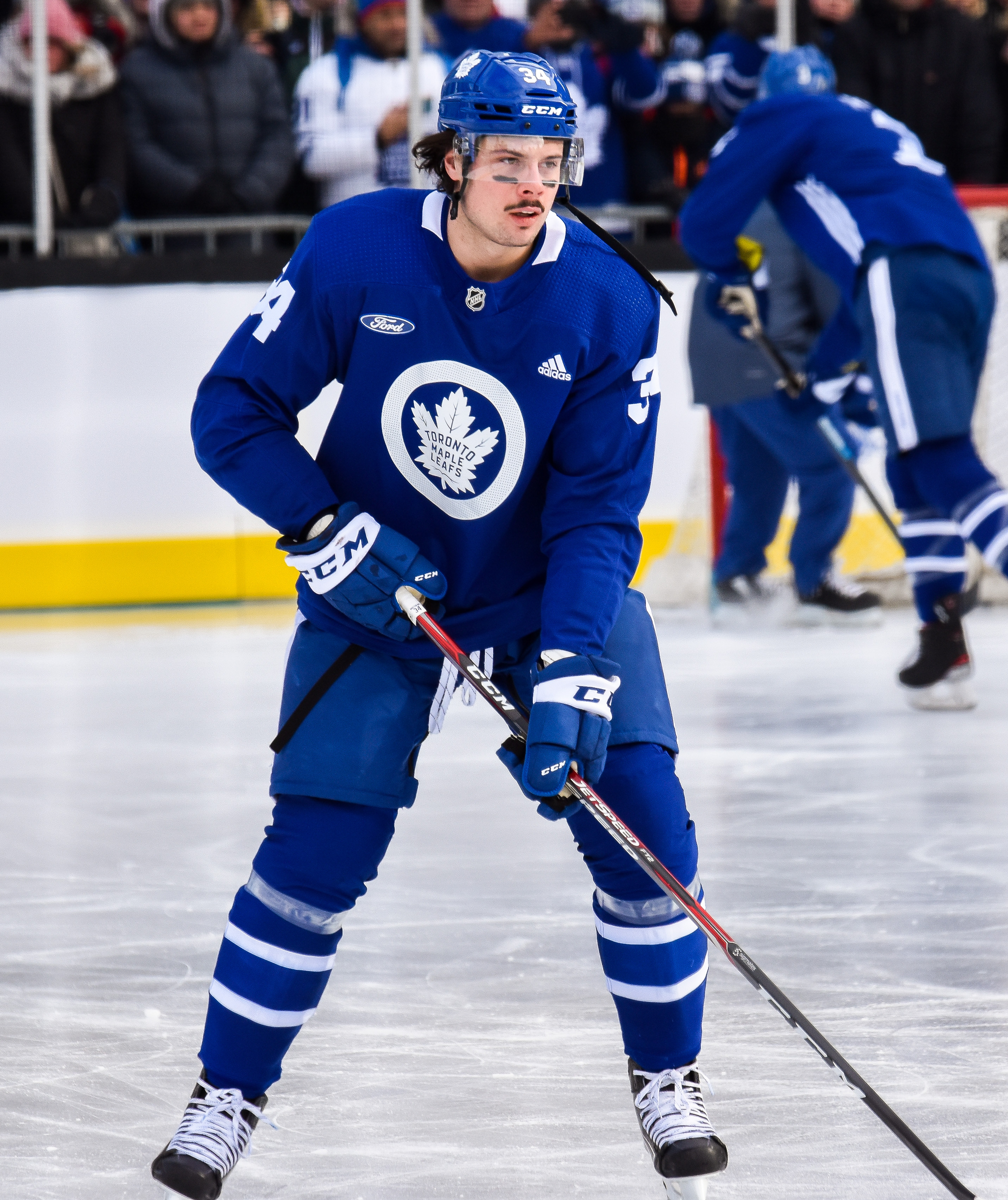
Auston Matthews, three-time winner

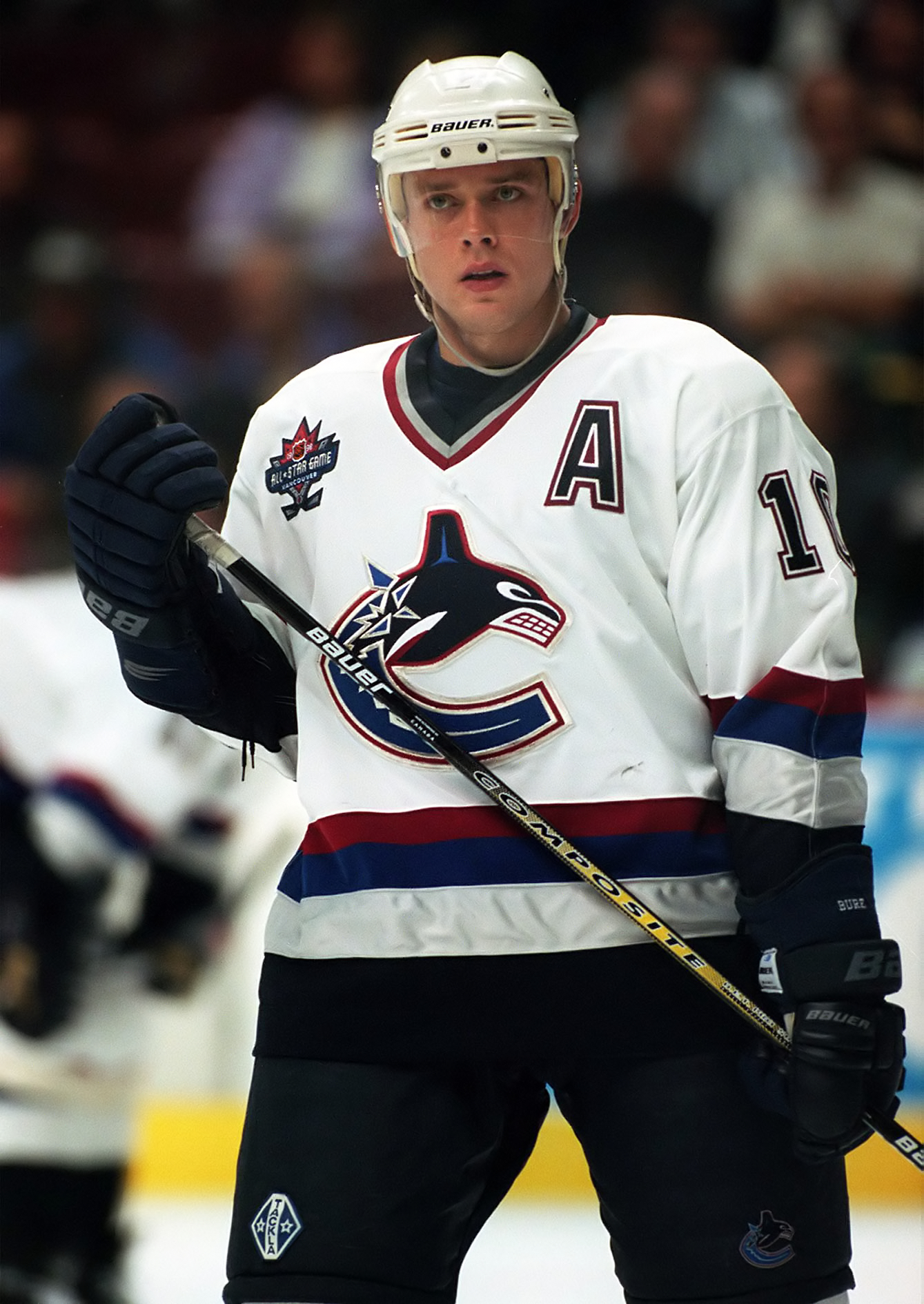
Pavel Bure, two-time winner, the first repeat winner

Key

- ^{(#)} Wins including leading goal scorers prior to the trophy's formal introduction
^ Player is still active
† Player's team won the Stanley Cup
* Player elected to the Hockey Hall of Fame
~ Inactive player not yet eligible for the Hockey Hall of Fame

Season	Winner	Team	Goals	Games	Win #
1998–99	Teemu Selanne*	Mighty Ducks of Anaheim	47	75	1 ^{(3)}
1999–2000	Pavel Bure*	Florida Panthers	58	74	1 ^{(2)}
2000–01	Pavel Bure*	Florida Panthers	59	82	2 ^{(3)}
2001–02	Jarome Iginla*	Calgary Flames	52	82	1
2002–03	Milan Hejduk	Colorado Avalanche	50	82	1
2003–04	Rick Nash	Columbus Blue Jackets	41	80	1
2003–04	Ilya Kovalchuk~	Atlanta Thrashers	41	81	1
2003–04	Jarome Iginla*	Calgary Flames	41	81	2
2004–05	Season cancelled due to the 2004–05 NHL lockout				
2005–06	Jonathan Cheechoo	San Jose Sharks	56	82	1
2006–07	Vincent Lecavalier	Tampa Bay Lightning	52	82	1
2007–08	Alexander Ovechkin^	Washington Capitals	65	82	1
2008–09	Alexander Ovechkin^	Washington Capitals	56	79	2
2009–10	Sidney Crosby^	Pittsburgh Penguins	51	81	1
2009–10	Steven Stamkos^	Tampa Bay Lightning	51	82	1
2010–11	Corey Perry^	Anaheim Ducks	50	82	1
2011–12	Steven Stamkos^	Tampa Bay Lightning	60	82	2
2012–13 (Note: Season shortened by the 2012–13 NHL lockout)	Alexander Ovechkin^	Washington Capitals	32	48	3
2013–14	Alexander Ovechkin^	Washington Capitals	51	78	4
2014–15	Alexander Ovechkin^	Washington Capitals	53	81	5
2015–16	Alexander Ovechkin^	Washington Capitals	50	79	6
2016–17	Sidney Crosby^	Pittsburgh Penguins†	44	75	2
2017–18	Alexander Ovechkin^	Washington Capitals†	49	82	7
2018–19	Alexander Ovechkin^	Washington Capitals	51	81	8
2019–20 (Note: Season shortened by the COVID-19 pandemic)	Alexander Ovechkin^	Washington Capitals	48	68	9
2019–20	David Pastrnak^	Boston Bruins	48	70	1
2020–21	Auston Matthews^	Toronto Maple Leafs	41	52	1
2021–22	Auston Matthews^	Toronto Maple Leafs	60	73	2
2022–23	Connor McDavid^	Edmonton Oilers	64	82	1
2023–24	Auston Matthews^	Toronto Maple Leafs	69	81	3
2024–25	Leon Draisaitl^	Edmonton Oilers	52	71	1
2025–26	Nathan MacKinnon^	Colorado Avalanche	53	80	1

== See also ==
- List of past NHL scoring leaders
- List of NHL goal scoring leaders by season

== Sources ==
- Dinger, Ralph (2004). National Hockey League Official Guide & Record Book. Toronto: Dan Diamond. ISBN 0-920445-84-5.
