= Los Angeles Canadiens =

- City: Los Angeles, California
- League: California Hockey League (CaHL)
- Operated: 1955–1963
- Home arena: Pan-Pacific Auditorium (1955–1963); Torrance Olympic Ice Arena (1963)

Franchise history
- 1955–1962: Los Angeles Canadiens
- 1962–1963: Los Angeles Canucks
- 1963: Torrance Olympians

The Los Angeles Canadiens were a semi-professional ice hockey team in Los Angeles, California.

== History ==
Coming into existence in the second year of the California Hockey League, the Los Angeles Canadiens were the longest-lived franchise of the group. The team survived for seven years but began experiencing problems when the Western Hockey League expanded south in 1961. A little over a year after the Los Angeles Blades first took the ice, the Canadiens were forced to move to Torrance mid-way through their eighth season. After the year, both the team and the league folded.

== Year-by-year results ==
Season	GP	W	L	T	Pts	Finish
1955–56	?	?	?	?	?	?
1956–57	15	8	6	1	17	2nd
1957–58	16	15	0	1	31	1st
1958–59	34	31	2	1	61	1st
1959–60	15	13	2	0	26	1st
1960–61	18	7	9	2	18	3rd
1961–62	16	11	5	0	22	1st
1962–63	?	?	?	?	?	?
