= Alex Kaleta =

Canadian ice hockey player

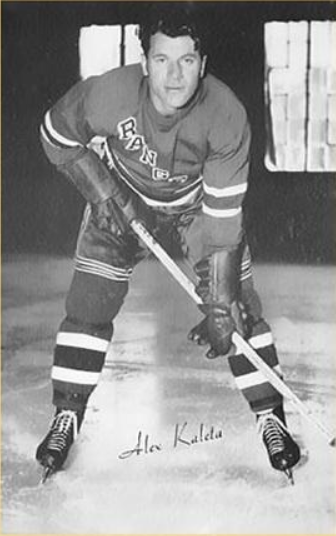
- Kaleta in 1940s photo
- Born: November 29, 1919 Canmore, Alberta, Canada
- Died: July 9, 1987 (aged 67)
- Height: 5 ft 11 in (180 cm)
- Weight: 160 lb (73 kg; 11 st 6 lb)
- Position: Left wing
- Shot: Left
- Played for: Chicago Black Hawks; New York Rangers
- Playing career: 1941–1955

Alexander George "Killer" Kaleta (November 29, 1919 – July 9, 1987) was a Canadian professional ice hockey player. He played in the National Hockey League (NHL) for the Chicago Black Hawks and New York Rangers between 1941 and 1951 and is best known for his part in originating hockey's hat trick tradition.

== Playing career ==
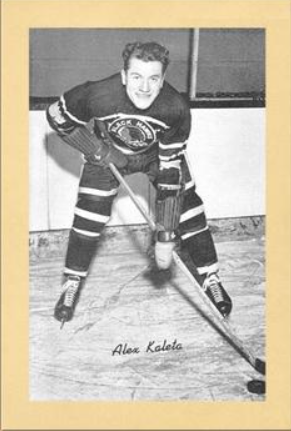
Kaleta in 1940s card for Chicago Black Hawks

After playing in the Alberta Senior Hockey League (ASHL), Kaleta joined the NHL with the Chicago Black Hawks in 1941–42. He recorded 28 points in 47 games as a rookie that season. During his tenure with the Black Hawks, he is credited with having begun the tradition of the hat trick during the 1945–46 season, when he entered a shop in Toronto looking for a new hat. Without enough money to buy one, he reached an agreement with shop owner Sammy Taft that if he scored three goals that night in a game against the Toronto Maple Leafs, he would earn a free hat. In fact, that night, on January 26, 1946, he scored four goals against the Leafs. While there are other accounts of the hat trick's origin in hockey, Kaleta's story is the one recognized by the Hockey Hall of Fame. Kaleta went on to complete the season that year with an NHL career-high 46 points.

After four seasons with the Black Hawks, Kaleta joined the New York Rangers in 1948–49. He recorded consecutive 31-point seasons in two seasons with the Rangers before ending his NHL career by joining the Saskatoon Quakers of the minor pro Pacific Coast Hockey League (PCHL) in 1951–52. The next season, the PCHL was absorbed by the Western Hockey League (WHL), where Kaleta played with the Quakers for three more seasons before retiring in 1954–55.

== Career statistics ==
=== Regular season and playoffs ===
			Regular season					Playoffs
Season	Team	League	GP	G	A	Pts	PIM	GP	G	A	Pts	PIM
1937–38	Canmore Britquettes	CCJHL	10	10	3	13	20	—	—	—	—	—
1937–38	Lethbridge Maple Leafs	ASHL	22	20	8	28	8	2	1	1	2	2
1938–39	Calgary Stampeders	ASHL	32	15	13	28	39	—	—	—	—	—
1939–40	Regina Vic Aces	SSHL	32	19	20	39	33	9	4	6	10	10
1940–41	Lethbridge Maple Leafs	ASHL	24	20	28	48	22	5	2	4	6	4
1940–41	Lethbridge Maple Leafs	Al-Cup	—	—	—	—	—	10	6	5	11	22
1941–42	Chicago Black Hawks	NHL	48	7	21	28	24	3	1	2	3	0
1942–43	Calgary Currie Army	CNDHL	24	23	35	58	23	5	4	3	7	6
1942–43	Calgary Currie Army	Al-Cup	—	—	—	—	—	5	2	4	6	0
1943–44	Calgary Currie Army	CNDHL	15	8	15	23	24	2	5	1	6	2
1944–45	Calgary Currie Army	CNDHL	16	14	12	26	16	3	1	2	3	12
1945–46	Chicago Black Hawks	NHL	49	19	27	46	17	4	0	1	1	2
1946–47	Chicago Black Hawks	NHL	57	24	20	44	37	—	—	—	—	—
1947–48	Chicago Black Hawks	NHL	52	10	16	26	40	—	—	—	—	—
1948–49	New York Rangers	NHL	56	12	19	31	18	—	—	—	—	—
1949–50	New York Rangers	NHL	67	17	14	31	40	10	0	3	3	0
1950–51	New York Rangers	NHL	58	3	4	7	26	—	—	—	—	—
1950–51	Hershey Bears	AHL	5	0	2	2	6	—	—	—	—	—
1951–52	Saskatoon Quakers	PCHL	62	38	44	82	23	13	6	13	19	4
1952–53	Saskatoon Quakers	WHL	70	26	57	83	6	13	9	14	23	2
1953–54	Saskatoon Quakers	WHL	70	19	53	72	52	6	0	5	5	4
1954–55	Saskatoon Quakers	WHL	3	2	9	11	10	—	—	—	—	—
NHL totals			387	92	121	213	202	17	1	6	7	2
