= 1966 Allan Cup =

Canadian senior ice hockey championship

The Allan Cup trophy

The 1966 Allan Cup was the Canadian senior ice hockey championship for the 1965–66 senior "A" season. The event was hosted by the Drumheller Miners and Calgary, Alberta. The 1966 playoff marked the 58th time that the Allan Cup has been awarded.

== Teams ==
- Sherbrooke Beavers (Eastern Canadian Champions)
- Drumheller Miners (Western Canadian Champions)

== Playdowns ==
=== Allan Cup Best-of-Seven Series ===
Drumheller Miners 6 - Sherbrooke Beavers 3
Sherbrooke Beavers 4 - Drumheller Miners 1
Sherbrooke Beavers 2 - Drumheller Miners 1
Drumheller Miners 5 - Sherbrooke Beavers 0
Drumheller Miners 3 - Sherbrooke Beavers 2
Drumheller Miners 5 - Sherbrooke Beavers 0

=== Eastern Playdowns ===
Quarter-final

Collingwood Shipbuilders defeated Sudbury-Levack Steelworkers 3-games-to-1

Collingwood Shipbuilders 8 - Sudbury-Levack Steelworkers 5
Sudbury-Levack Steelworkers 5 - Collingwood Shipbuilders 3
Collingwood Shipbuilders 8 - Sudbury-Levack Steelworkers 1
Collingwood Shipbuilders 11 - Sudbury-Levack Steelworkers 1

Morrisburg Combines defeated Monkton Hawks 3-games-to-1

Monkton Hawks 10 - Morrisburg Combines 3
Morrisburg Combines 5 - Monkton Hawks 3
Morrisburg Combines 5 - Monkton Hawks 4
Morrisburg Combines 3 - Monkton Hawks 1

Central Semi-final

Guelph Regals defeated Collingwood Shipbuilders 4-games-to-none

Guelph Regals 3 - Collingwood Shipbuilders 0
Guelph Regals 7 - Collingwood Shipbuilders 6
Guelph Regals 8 - Collingwood Shipbuilders 3
Guelph Regals 4 - Collingwood Shipbuilders 1

East Semi-final

Sherbrooke Beavers defeated Morrisburg Combines 4-games-to-3

Morrisburg Combines 3 - Sherbrooke Beavers 2
Sherbrooke Beavers 5 - Morrisburg Combines 2
Morrisburg Combines 2 - Sherbrooke Beavers 1
Morrisburg Combines 6 - Sherbrooke Beavers 5
Sherbrooke Beavers 11 - Morrisburg Combines 5
Sherbrooke Beavers 6 - Morrisburg Combines 2
Sherbrooke Beavers 9 - Morrisburg Combines 1

Final

Sherbrooke Beavers defeated Guelph Regals 4-games-to-2

Sherbrooke Beavers 7 - Guelph Regals 2
Guelph Regals 4 - Sherbrooke Beavers 3
Guelph Regals 5 - Sherbrooke Beavers 3
Sherbrooke Beavers 4 - Guelph Regals 3
Sherbrooke Beavers 4 - Guelph Regals 3
Sherbrooke Beavers 4 - Guelph Regals 2

=== Western Playdowns ===
Quarter-final

Drumheller Miners defeated Calgary Spurs 3-games-to-none

Drumheller Miners 2 - Calgary Spurs 1
Drumheller Miners 7 - Calgary Spurs 3
Drumheller Miners 6 - Calgary Spurs 0

Pacific Semi-final

Drumheller Miners defeated Kimberley Dynamiters 3-games-to-none

Drumheller Miners 4 - Kimberley Dynamiters 3
Drumheller Miners 6 - Kimberley Dynamiters 4
Drumheller Miners 3 - Kimberley Dynamiters 2

West Semi-final

Selkirk Fishermen defeated Fort William Beavers 3-games-to-1

Selkirk Fishermen 9 - Fort William Beavers 6
Selkirk Fishermen 5 - Fort William Beavers 4
Fort William Beavers 5 - Selkirk Fishermen 2
Selkirk Fishermen 7 - Fort William Beavers 1

Final

Drumheller Miners defeated Selkirk Fishermen 3-games-to-1

Drumheller Miners 9 - Selkirk Fishermen 2
Selkirk Fishermen 6 - Drumheller Miners 3
Drumheller Miners ? - Selkirk Fishermen ?
Drumheller Miners 4 - Selkirk Fishermen 2
