= List of NHL players with 500 goals =

As of the 2025–26 season – the 108th regular season of play of the National Hockey League (NHL) – 50 different ice hockey players have scored at least 500 regular season goals in their NHL career.

A 500-goal career was first achieved in the 41st year of the NHL (1957–58), when Maurice Richard scored his 500th goal in his 863rd game. Patrick Kane was the most recent NHL player to score 500 goals, doing so on January 8, 2026.

== Season achievements ==
The 2006–07 season saw the largest number of players (five) achieve their 500th goal (Teemu Selänne, Mike Modano, Mark Recchi, Mats Sundin, and Peter Bondra). A total of four players scored their 500th goal in 1995–96 (Mario Lemieux, Steve Yzerman, Mark Messier, and Dale Hawerchuk)

The longest stretch between 500 goal scorers was the eight seasons between Gordie Howe (second to achieve the mark), in 1961–62, and Bobby Hull, in 1969–70.

== Player achievements ==
The 50 players to score 500 goals consist of 36 Canadian-born Canadians, (Note: Bryan Trottier was born in Canada and played internationally for both Canada and the United States, as allowed under the Jay Treaty § Native American rights provisions. Brett Hull was also born in Canada but played for the United States.) five US-born Americans (Joe Mullen, Mike Modano, Jeremy Roenick, Keith Tkachuk, and Patrick Kane); three Slovaks (Stan Mikita, Peter Bondra, and Marian Hossa), (Note: Stan Mikita played for Canada internationally, however, being born in the Slovak Republic that existed during World War II, he is widely regarded to be one of three Slovaks who have reached the 500 goal mark.) two Finns (Jari Kurri and Teemu Selänne), two Russians (Evgeni Malkin and Alexander Ovechkin), one Czech (Jaromir Jagr) and one Swede (Mats Sundin). Stan Mikita was the first player not born in Canada to score 500 goals (he was born in the Slovak Republic, but represented Canada internationally); Jari Kurri was the first 500-goal scorer who never played for the Canadian national team.

The fewest NHL games required to reach the mark is 575, set by Wayne Gretzky. Second-quickest is Mario Lemieux, who achieved the mark in his 605th game. With Mike Bossy (647) and Brett Hull (693) following, only these four players needed fewer than 800 games to score their first 500 goals.

Of the 50 players to score at least 500 goals in their career, 19 reached the mark in fewer than 1000 career games played.

Of those on the list, Lanny McDonald came closest to not achieving 500 goals; he reached the mark with only four games left in his final NHL season. Similarly, Joe Mullen scored his 500th goal with only ten games left in his final season. Glenn Anderson is the closest player to never reach the mark, retiring in 1996 with 498 career NHL goals.

Five players have scored their 500th goal on an empty net: Mike Bossy, Wayne Gretzky, Jari Kurri, Keith Tkachuk, and Patrick Kane.

Maurice Richard and Peter Bondra are the only players with over 500 goals but fewer than 1,000 points.

Patrick Roy is the only goaltender to concede more than one opponent's 500th career goal: Steve Yzerman in 1996, Joe Mullen in 1997, and Brendan Shanahan in 2002. A contributing factor for this statistical coincidence is Roy playing the third-most games ever by a goaltender, at 1,029.

In 2006, on Hockey Night in Canada, Mats Sundin scored his 500th goal short-handed, in overtime, to finish off a hat trick and to win the game for the Toronto Maple Leafs.

== Team achievements ==
A total of 20 franchises have had a player score their 500th goal while playing for the franchise. The Detroit Red Wings, Chicago Blackhawks, and Pittsburgh Penguins have had five players score their 500th goal while playing for the team.

No team has had multiple players reaching 500 goals on the same team in the same season. The 2001–02 Detroit Red Wings were the first team to have three 500+ goal scorers on the roster (Steve Yzerman, Brett Hull, and Luc Robitaille), and would finish the season with four players in the club after Brendan Shanahan scored his 500th.

== 500-goal scorers ==
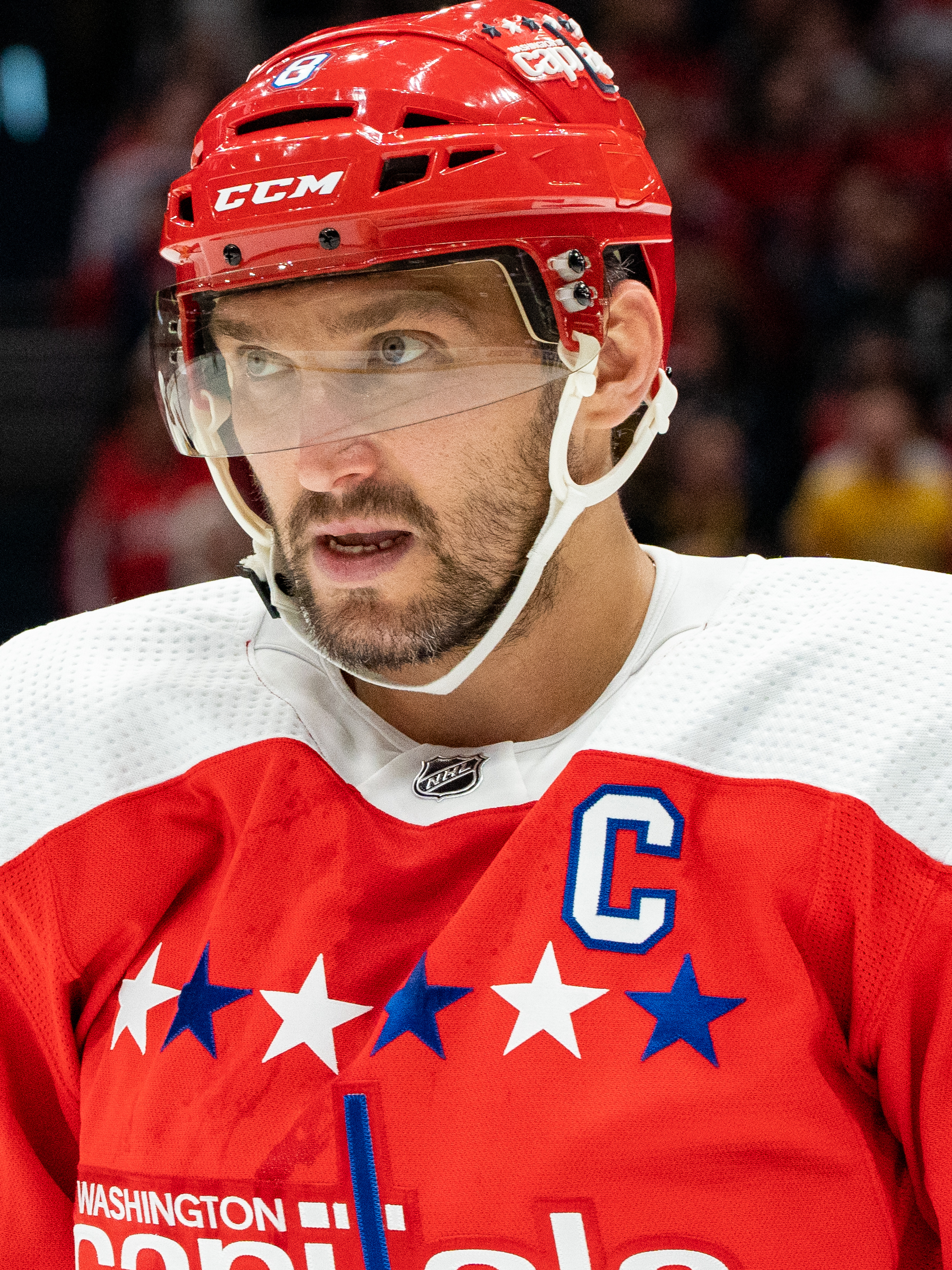
Alexander Ovechkin is the NHL's all-time leading goal scorer.

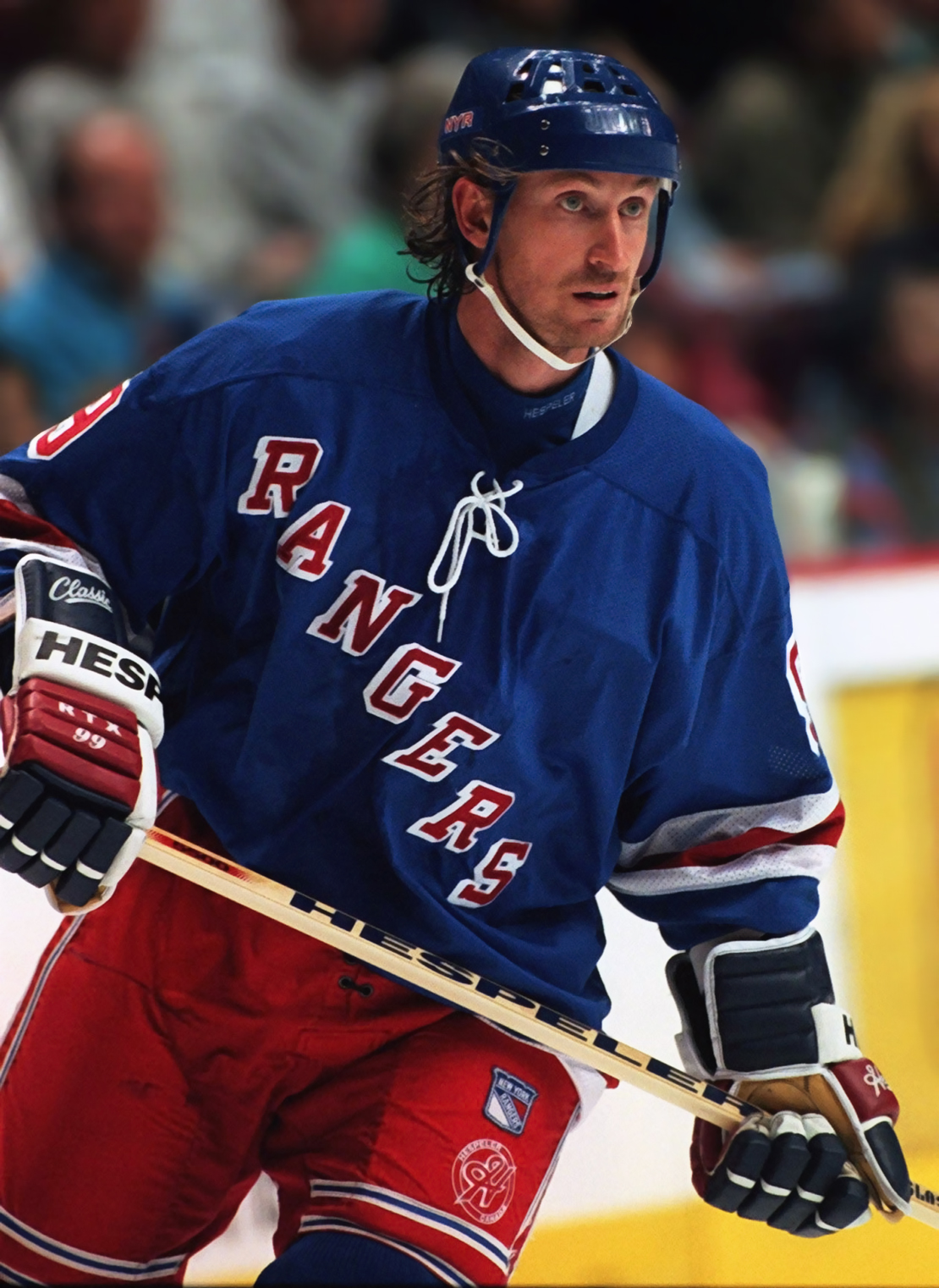
Wayne Gretzky is second all-time, and held the record from 1994 to 2025.

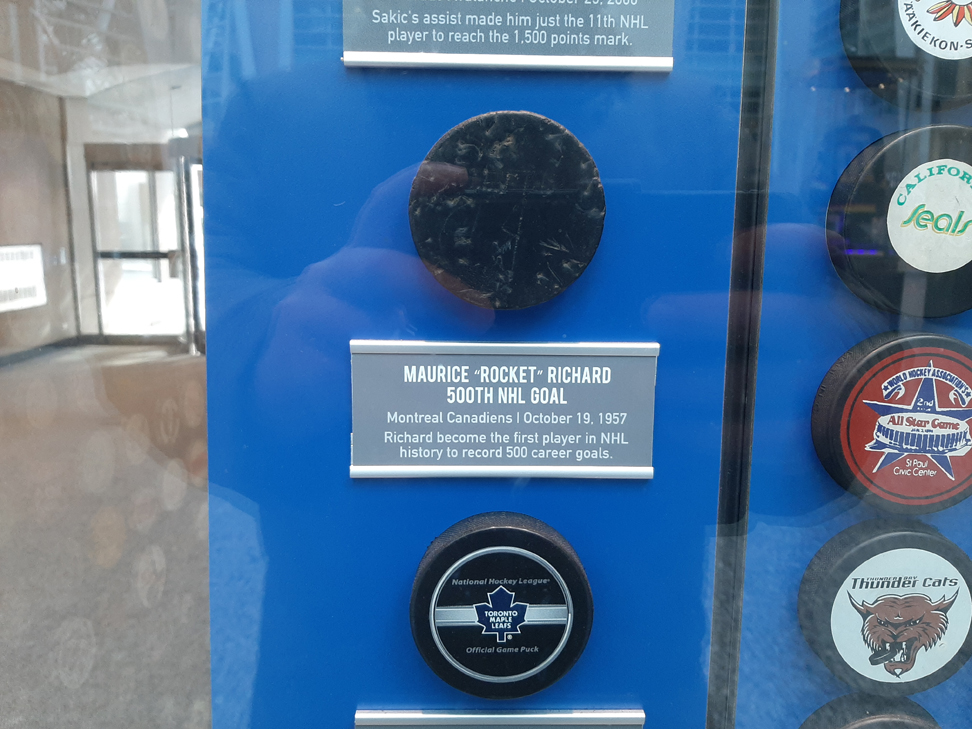
The puck Maurice Richard used to score his 500th NHL goal on October 19, 1957. Richard was the first player in league history to record 500 career goals.

The list as of the 2025–26 NHL season, is:

Legend
Rank – Ranking on all-time goals list
Goals – Career regular season goals
GP – Career regular season games played
G/GP – Mean goals per game played, rounded to two decimal places
With team – Team for which the player scored their 500th goal
Game no. – Number of career regular season games played when 500th goal was scored
HHOF – Year of induction into the Hockey Hall of Fame or eligibility
Active NHL player
Active player outside of NHL

Rank	Player		Goals	GP	Date of 500th goal	With team	Game no.	Opposing goaltender	HHOF	Ref.
1	(Russia)	Alexander Ovechkin	929	1,573	January 10, 2016	Washington Capitals	801	Andrew Hammond (Senators)	Active	
2	(Canada)	Wayne Gretzky	894	1,487	November 22, 1986	Edmonton Oilers	575	(empty Canucks net)	1999	
3	(Canada)	Gordie Howe	801	1,767	March 14, 1962	Detroit Red Wings	1,045	Gump Worsley (Rangers)	1972	
4	(Czech Republic)	Jaromir Jagr	766	1,733	February 4, 2003	Washington Capitals	928	John Grahame (Lightning)	Active (ELH)	
5	(Canada) (United States)	Brett Hull	741	1,269	December 22, 1996	St. Louis Blues	693	Stephane Fiset (Kings)	2009	
6	(Canada)	Marcel Dionne	731	1,348	December 14, 1982	Los Angeles Kings	887	Al Jensen (Capitals)	1992	
7	(Canada)	Phil Esposito	717	1,282	December 22, 1974	Boston Bruins	803	Jim Rutherford (Red Wings)	1984	
8	(Canada)	Mike Gartner	708	1,432	October 14, 1991	New York Rangers	936	Mike Liut (Capitals)	2001	
9	(Canada)	Mark Messier	694	1,756	November 6, 1995	New York Rangers	1,141	Rick Tabaracci (Flames)	2007	
10	(Canada)	Steve Yzerman	692	1,514	January 17, 1996	Detroit Red Wings	906	Patrick Roy (Avalanche)	2009	
11	(Canada)	Mario Lemieux	690	915	October 26, 1995	Pittsburgh Penguins	605	Tommy Soderstrom (Islanders)	1997	
12	(Finland)	Teemu Selänne	684	1,451	November 22, 2006	Anaheim Ducks	982	Jose Theodore (Avalanche)	2017	
13	(Canada)	Luc Robitaille	668	1,431	January 7, 1999	Los Angeles Kings	928	Dwayne Roloson (Sabres)	2009	
14	(Canada)	Brendan Shanahan	656	1,524	March 23, 2002	Detroit Red Wings	1,100	Patrick Roy (Avalanche)	2013	
15	(Canada)	Sidney Crosby	654	1,420	February 15, 2022	Pittsburgh Penguins	1,077	Carter Hart (Flyers)	Active	
16	(Canada)	Dave Andreychuk	640	1,639	March 15, 1997	New Jersey Devils	1,070	Bill Ranford (Capitals)	2017	
17	(Canada)	Joe Sakic	625	1,378	December 11, 2002	Colorado Avalanche	1,044	Dan Cloutier (Canucks)	2012	
18	(Canada)	Jarome Iginla	625	1,554	January 7, 2012	Calgary Flames	1,149	Niklas Backstrom (Wild)	2020	
19	(Canada)	Steven Stamkos	624	1,246	January 18, 2023	Tampa Bay Lightning	965	Spencer Martin (Canucks)	Active	
20	(Canada)	Bobby Hull	610	1,063	February 21, 1970	Chicago Blackhawks	861	Eddie Giacomin (Rangers)	1983	
21	(Canada)	Dino Ciccarelli	608	1,232	January 8, 1994	Detroit Red Wings	946	Kelly Hrudey (Kings)	2010	
22	(Finland)	Jari Kurri	601	1,251	October 17, 1992	Los Angeles Kings	833	(empty Bruins net)	2001	
23	(Canada)	Mark Recchi	577	1,652	January 26, 2007	Pittsburgh Penguins	1,303	Marty Turco (Stars)	2017	
24	(Canada)	Mike Bossy	573	752	January 2, 1986	New York Islanders	647	(empty Bruins net)	1991	
25	(Canada)	Patrick Marleau	566	1,779	February 2, 2017	San Jose Sharks	1,463	Ryan Miller (Canucks)	—	
26	(Canada)	Joe Nieuwendyk	564	1,257	January 17, 2003	New Jersey Devils	1,094	Kevin Weekes (Hurricanes)	2011	
26	(Sweden)	Mats Sundin	564	1,346	October 14, 2006	Toronto Maple Leafs	1,162	Miikka Kiprusoff (Flames)	2012	
28	(United States)	Mike Modano	561	1,499	March 13, 2007	Dallas Stars	1,225	Antero Niittymaki (Flyers)	2014	
29	(Canada)	Guy Lafleur	560	1,126	December 20, 1983	Montreal Canadiens	918	Glenn Resch (Devils)	1988	
30	(Canada)	Johnny Bucyk	556	1,540	October 30, 1975	Boston Bruins	1,370	Yves Belanger (Blues)	1981	
31	(Canada)	Ron Francis	549	1,731	January 2, 2002	Carolina Hurricanes	1,533	Byron Dafoe (Bruins)	2007	
32	(Canada)	Michel Goulet	548	1,089	February 16, 1992	Chicago Blackhawks	951	Jeff Reese (Flames)	1998	
33	(Canada)	Maurice Richard	544	978	October 19, 1957	Montreal Canadiens	863	Glenn Hall (Black Hawks)	1961	
34	(Canada) (Slovakia)	Stan Mikita	541	1,396	February 27, 1977	Chicago Blackhawks	1,221	Cesare Maniago (Canucks)	1983	
35	(United States)	Keith Tkachuk	538	1,201	April 6, 2008	St. Louis Blues	1,055	(empty Blue Jackets net)	2026	
36	(Canada)	Frank Mahovlich	533	1,181	March 21, 1973	Montreal Canadiens	1,105	Dunc Wilson (Canucks)	1981	
37	(Russia)	Evgeni Malkin	533	1,269	October 16, 2024	Pittsburgh Penguins	1,150	Ukko-Pekka Luukkonen (Sabres)	Active	
38	(Slovakia)	Marian Hossa	525	1,309	October 18, 2016	Chicago Blackhawks	1,240	Michal Neuvirth (Flyers)	2020	
39	(Canada)	John Tavares	525	1,266	October 29, 2025	Toronto Maple Leafs	1,149	Elvis Merzlikins (Blue Jackets)	Active	
40	(Canada) (United States)	Bryan Trottier	524	1,279	February 13, 1990	New York Islanders	1,104	Rick Wamsley (Flames)	1997	
41	(Canada)	Pat Verbeek	522	1,424	March 22, 2000	Detroit Red Wings	1,285	Fred Brathwaite (Flames)	—	
42	(Canada)	Dale Hawerchuk	518	1,188	January 31, 1996	St. Louis Blues	1,103	Felix Potvin (Maple Leafs)	2001	
43	(Canada)	Pierre Turgeon	515	1,294	November 8, 2005	Colorado Avalanche	1,229	Vesa Toskala (Sharks)	2023	
44	(United States)	Jeremy Roenick	513	1,363	November 10, 2007	San Jose Sharks	1,267	Alex Auld (Coyotes)	2024	
45	(Canada)	Gilbert Perreault	512	1,191	March 9, 1986	Buffalo Sabres	1,159	Alain Chevrier (Devils)	1990	
46	(United States)	Patrick Kane	508	1,369	January 8, 2026	Detroit Red Wings	1,332	(empty Canucks net)	Active	
47	(Canada)	Jean Beliveau	507	1,125	February 11, 1971	Montreal Canadiens	1,101	Gilles Gilbert (North Stars)	1972	
48	(Slovakia)	Peter Bondra	503	1,081	December 22, 2006	Chicago Blackhawks	1,050	Jean-Sebastien Aubin (Maple Leafs)	—	
49	(United States)	Joe Mullen	502	1,062	March 14, 1997	Pittsburgh Penguins	1,052	Patrick Roy (Avalanche)	2000	
50	(Canada)	Lanny McDonald	500	1,111	March 21, 1989	Calgary Flames	1,107	Mark Fitzpatrick (Islanders)	1992	

== 500th goal scored during the 2025–26 NHL season ==
Players with 500th NHL goal in the 2025–26 NHL season
Order reaching milestone	National team	Player	Team	Game no.	Date	Opposing goaltender
49	(Canada)	John Tavares	Toronto Maple Leafs	1,149	October 29, 2025	Elvis Merzlikins (Blue Jackets)
50	(United States)	Patrick Kane	Detroit Red Wings	1,332	January 8, 2026	(empty Canucks net)
