= Drumheller Miners =

Former senior ice hockey team in Alberta, Canada

- Sport: Ice hockey
- League: ASHL (1930s); Senior "A" league (1960s/70s)
- Location: Drumheller, Alberta, Canada
- League titles: 1
- Division titles: 1

The Drumheller Miners were a senior ice hockey team based in Drumheller, Alberta, Canada.

== History ==
Two incarnations of the team existed. The first was a member of the Alberta Senior Hockey League (ASHL) in the late 1930s. The Miners playing in the ASHL featured the five Bentley brothers, Doug, Max, Reg, Roy and Wyatt. Doug, Max and Reg went on to play in the National Hockey League (NHL), while Doug and Max were both elected into the Hockey Hall of Fame.

The second Miners team existed in the 1960s and 1970s. Drumheller won the 1966 Allan Cup played at the Stampede Corral in Calgary. They represented Canada at the 1967 Ahearne Cup tournament in Sweden, accompanied by Canadian Amateur Hockey Association president Art Potter. Drumheller finished in last place at the tournament, and lost by a 3–1 score to the Swedish team in a game that nearly resulted in an on-ice brawl. Potter felt that the officiating at the tournament was disgraceful and a deliberate attempt to prevent Drumheller from winning, and had authorized the team to protest the officiating and withdraw from a game in progress.

The Drumheller Mail reported that the Miners were the first free-world hockey team to compete in East Germany during the Cold War.

== See also ==
- List of ice hockey teams in Alberta
