= California Hockey League (1954–1963) =

US ice hockey league

The California Hockey League was an ice hockey league that existed from 1954 to 1963. It was not related to the prior league of the same name that operated from 1928 to 1933.

== Franchises ==
- Bakersfield Kernals (1962–1963)
- Burbank Stars (1961–1963)
- Hollywood Bears (1957–1959)
- Hollywood Stars / Rangers (1954–1956)
- Hollywood Stars (1959–1960)
- LA Canada Flyers (1956–1957)
- Long Beach Buccaneers (1961–1962)
- Long Beach Gulls (1962–1963)
- Long Beach Hornets (1959–1960)
- Long Beach Paramounts (1960–1961)
- Los Angeles Canadiens (1955–1963)
- Ontario Canucks (1958–1959)
- Paramount Hornets (1954–1959)
- Pasadena Leafs (1954–1957)
- Pasadena Panthers (1957–1958, 1959–1960)
- Phoenix Apaches (1958–1959)
- San Bernardino Shamrocks (1954–1955)
- San Diego Skyhawks (1960–1962)
- San Gabriel Falcons (1960–1961)
- Torrance Olympians (1963)
