= Alberta Senior Hockey League (1965–1978) =

Senior level ice hockey league in Canada

- Classification: Senior hockey
- Sport: Ice hockey
- Founded: 1965
- Folded: 1978
- No. of teams: 3–5
- Country: Canada
- Most titles: Calgary Stampeders (3)

The Alberta Senior Hockey League was a Canadian senior ice hockey league which operated in Alberta from 1965 and 1978. The Alberta Amateur Hockey Association (AAHA) consolidated its senior hockey leagues in 1965, resulting in one league for the province and folding the Central Alberta Hockey League. Several teams from the AAHA opted instead for inter-provincial play in the Western Canada Senior Hockey League, based in Alberta and Saskatchewan.

The Drumheller Miners won the 1966 Allan Cup played at the Stampede Corral in Calgary. They represented Canada at the 1967 Ahearne Cup tournament in Sweden. The Calgary Stampeders represented the league and Western Canada at the 1969 Allan Cup, and 1971 Allan Cup.

== Champions ==
List of champions:

- 1965–66: Edmonton Oil Kings (junior ice hockey team playing in a senior league)
- 1966–67: not played
- 1967–68: Drumheller Miners
- 1968–69: Calgary Stampeders
- 1969–70: Calgary Stampeders
- 1970–71: Calgary Stampeders
- 1977–78: Calgary Trojans (regular season champion)
