= 1946 Stanley Cup Final =

1946 ice hockey championship series

	1	2	3	4	5	Total
Montreal Canadiens	4*	3*	4	2*	6	4
Boston Bruins	3*	2*	2	3*	3	1
- * – Denotes overtime period(s)
- Location(s): Montreal: Montreal Forum (1, 2, 5); Boston: Boston Garden (3, 4)
- Coaches: Montreal: Dick Irvin; Boston: Dit Clapper
- Captains: Montreal: Toe Blake; Boston: Dit Clapper
- Dates: March 30 – April 9, 1946
- Series-winning goal: Toe Blake (11:06, third)
- Hall of Famers: Canadiens: Toe Blake (1966); Emile Bouchard (1966); Bill Durnan (1964); Elmer Lach (1966); Buddy O'Connor (1988); Ken Reardon (1966); Maurice Richard (1961); Bruins: Bobby Bauer (1996); Frank Brimsek (1966); Dit Clapper (1947); Roy Conacher (1998); Bill Cowley (1968); Woody Dumart (1992); Milt Schmidt (1961); Coaches: Dit Clapper (1947, player); Dick Irvin (1958, player)

The 1946 Stanley Cup Final was a best-of-seven series between the Boston Bruins and the Montreal Canadiens. The Canadiens won the series four games to one.

== Paths to the Finals ==
Boston defeated the Detroit Red Wings 4–1 to advance to the Finals. Montreal defeated the Chicago Black Hawks 4–0 to advance to the Finals.

== Game summaries ==
Brothers Terry and Ken Reardon faced each other in the 1946 Stanley Cup Finals, with Terry playing for Boston and Ken playing for Montreal. This made them one of the few sets of brothers to face each other on opposing teams in the Stanley Cup Finals, and the two even dropped gloves against each other at one point.

March 30	Boston Bruins	3–4	OT	Montreal Canadiens	Montreal Forum	Recap
No scoring		First period		No scoring
Bep Guidolin (4) - 5:09; Woody Dumart (4) - 8:02		Second period		00:21 - pp - Butch Bouchard (1); 3:19 - Bob Fillion (3)
Jack Crawford (1) - 14:04		Third period		16:23 - Murph Chamberlain (3)
No scoring		First overtime period		9:08 - Maurice Richard (5)
Frank Brimsek		Goalie stats		Bill Durnan

April 2	Boston Bruins	2–3	OT	Montreal Canadiens	Montreal Forum	Recap
Pat Egan (3) - 10:55		First period		1:06 - Elmer Lach (3)
Bobby Bauer (3) - 3:04		Second period		No scoring
No scoring		Third period		10:10 - Butch Bouchard (2)
No scoring		First overtime period		16:55 - Jimmy Peters (3)
Frank Brimsek		Goalie stats		Bill Durnan

April 4	Montreal Canadiens	4–2	Boston Bruins	Boston Garden	Recap
Elmer Lach (4) - 10:14; Glen Harmon (1) - pp - 14:13		First period	11:01 - Bep Guidolin (5)
No scoring		Second period	18:41 - Terry Reardon (3)
Ken Mosdell (3) - 2:45; Dutch Hiller (3) - 5:18		Third period	No scoring
Bill Durnan		Goalie stats	Frank Brimsek

April 7	Montreal Canadiens	2–3	OT	Boston Bruins	Boston Garden	Recap
No scoring		First period		No scoring
Maurice Richard (6) - 13:46		Second period		8:05 - Murray Henderson (1)
Maurice Richard (7) - 4:04		Third period		3:01 - Don Gallinger (2)
No scoring		First overtime period		15:13 - Terry Reardon (4)
Bill Durnan		Goalie stats		Frank Brimsek

April 9	Boston Bruins	3–6	Montreal Canadiens	Montreal Forum	Recap
Bill Cowley (1) - p - 5:42; Bobby Bauer (4) - 14:01		First period	9:55 - Bob Fillion (4); 15:51 - Elmer Lach (5); 18:28 - Ken Mosdell (4)
Milt Schmidt (3) - 7:15		Second period	No scoring
No scoring		Third period	11:06 - Toe Blake (7); 14:05 - Murph Chamberlain (4); 17:13 - Dutch Hiller (4)
Frank Brimsek		Goalie stats	Bill Durnan

Montreal won series 4–1

== Stanley Cup engraving ==
The 1946 Stanley Cup was presented to Canadiens captain Toe Blake by NHL President Red Dutton following the Canadiens 6–3 win over the Bruins in game five.

The following Canadiens players and staff had their names engraved on the Stanley Cup

1945–46 Montreal Canadiens

=== Players ===
Centres

- 10 Herbert Buddy O'Connor
- 14 Bill Reay
- 16 Elmer Lach
- 18 Kenny Mosdell

Wingers

- 5 Wilbert Dutch Hiller
- 6 Hector Toe Blake (Captain)
- 9 Maurice "Rocket" Richard
- 11 Joe Benoit
- 12 Erwin Murph Chamberlain
- 15 Bob Fillion
- 19 Jimmy Peters, Sr.
- 20 Gerry Plamondon

Defencemen

- 2 Frank Eddolls
- 3 Emile "Butch" Bouchard
- 4 Leo Lamoureux
- 8 Glen Harmon
- 17 Ken Reardon

Goaltenders

1 Bill Durnan

=== Coaching and administrative staff ===
- Donat Raymond (President/Owner), Dalton Coleman (Vice President/Owner)
- Bill Hardy (Director), Tommy Gorman (Manager)
- Dick Irvin Sr. (Coach), Arthur Cayford (Secretary-Treasurer)†
- Ernie Cook (Trainer)†, Hector Dubois (Asst. Trainer)†
- William Northey (Vice President/Owner) was missing from the team picture and the Stanley Cup.

† Left off the cup, but included on the team picture.

=== Stanley Cup engraving ===
- Joe Benoit only won one Stanley Cup, but his name was engraved differently on all three rings with 1946 Montreal.
- Original Ring – Joseph Benoit 1946
- Presentation Ring – Jo Benoit 1957-58
- Replica Ring – Joe Benoit 1992-93

== See also ==
- 1945–46 NHL season

== References and notes ==
- Diamond, Dan (2000). Total Stanley Cup. Toronto: Total Sports Canada. ISBN 978-1-892129-07-9.
- Podnieks, Andrew; Hockey Hall of Fame (2004). Lord Stanley's Cup. Bolton, Ont.: Fenn Pub. pp 12, 50. ISBN 978-1-55168-261-7
- Hockey Reference

Preceded by Toronto Maple Leafs; 1945	Montreal Canadiens; Stanley Cup champions 1946	Succeeded by Toronto Maple Leafs; 1947
