= 1945–46 Boston Bruins season =

NHL team season

1945–46 Boston Bruins
- League: 2nd NHL
- 1945–46 record: 24–18–8
- Home record: 16–5–4
- Road record: 8–13–4
- Goals for: 167
- Goals against: 156

Team information
- General manager: Art Ross
- Coach: Dit Clapper
- Captain: Jack Crawford
- Arena: Boston Garden

Team leaders
- Goals: Woody Dumart (22)
- Assists: Don Gallinger (23)
- Points: Don Gallinger (40)
- Penalty minutes: Bep Guidolin (62)
- Wins: Frank Brimsek (16)
- Goals against average: Paul Bibeault (2.81)

The 1945–46 Boston Bruins season was the Boston Bruins 22nd season of operation in the National Hockey League (NHL). The Bruins made it to the 1946 Stanley Cup Finals only to lose to the rival Montreal Canadiens four games to one.

== Off-season ==
Art Ross, who had been coach and general manager of the Bruins since their inception, retired. Dit Clapper became the team's first playing coach, while Ross remained with the team as general manager. Several players returned from war-time duty, including goalie Frank Brimsek and the Kraut Line: Milt Schmidt, Bobby Bauer and Woody Dumart. The three had played with the Ottawa Commandos, winning the Allan Cup in 1943.

== Regular season ==
=== Final standings ===
National Hockey League
		GP	W	L	T	GF	GA	DIFF	Pts
1	Montreal Canadiens	50	28	17	5	172	134	+38	61
2	Boston Bruins	50	24	18	8	167	156	+11	56
3	Chicago Black Hawks	50	23	20	7	200	178	+22	53
4	Detroit Red Wings	50	20	20	10	146	159	−13	50
5	Toronto Maple Leafs	50	19	24	7	174	185	−11	45
6	New York Rangers	50	13	28	9	144	191	−47	35

=== Record vs. opponents ===
1945–46 NHL Records
Team	BOS	CHI	DET	MTL	NYR	TOR
Boston	—	4–6	4–3–3	4–5–1	6–3–1	6–1–3
Chicago	6–4	—	3–4–3	4–5–1	5–2–3	5–5
Detroit	3–4–3	4–3–3	—	6–3–1	4–4–2	3–6–1
Montreal	5–4–1	5–4–1	3–6–1	—	8–1–1	7–2–1
New York	3–6–1	2–5–3	4–4–2	1–8–1	—	3–5–2
Toronto	1–6–3	5–5	6–3–1	2–7–1	5–3–2	—

== Schedule and results ==
1945–46 regular season
October

Game	Result	Date	Score	Opponent	Record
1	L	October 24, 1945	4–5	Chicago Black Hawks (1945–46)	0–1–0
2	T	October 27, 1945	1–1	@ Toronto Maple Leafs (1945–46)	0–1–1
3	L	October 28, 1945	0–7	@ Detroit Red Wings (1945–46)	0–2–1

November

Game	Result	Date	Score	Opponent	Record
4	W	November 4, 1945	6–5	Montreal Canadiens (1945–46)	1–2–1
5	W	November 7, 1945	4–3	@ Toronto Maple Leafs (1945–46)	2–2–1
6	L	November 10, 1945	3–5	@ Montreal Canadiens (1945–46)	2–3–1
7	W	November 11, 1945	7–1	@ New York Rangers (1945–46)	3–3–1
8	W	November 21, 1945	3–0	Montreal Canadiens (1945–46)	4–3–1
9	W	November 25, 1945	5–3	Toronto Maple Leafs (1945–46)	5–3–1
10	W	November 28, 1945	5–1	New York Rangers (1945–46)	6–3–1

December

Game	Result	Date	Score	Opponent	Record
11	T	December 2, 1945	2–2	Detroit Red Wings (1945–46)	6–3–2
12	W	December 5, 1945	6–3	Chicago Black Hawks (1945–46)	7–3–2
13	L	December 9, 1945	3–8	@ Chicago Black Hawks (1945–46)	7–4–2
14	T	December 12, 1945	2–2	Detroit Red Wings (1945–46)	7–4–3
15	T	December 15, 1945	3–3	@ Montreal Canadiens (1945–46)	7–4–4
16	T	December 16, 1945	3–3	Toronto Maple Leafs (1945–46)	7–4–5
17	W	December 19, 1945	8–7	New York Rangers (1945–46)	8–4–5
18	L	December 23, 1945	1–4	Montreal Canadiens (1945–46)	8–5–5
19	W	December 29, 1945	4–3	@ Toronto Maple Leafs (1945–46)	9–5–5
20	T	December 30, 1945	3–3	@ Detroit Red Wings (1945–46)	9–5–6

January

Game	Result	Date	Score	Opponent	Record
21	W	January 1, 1946	4–0	Detroit Red Wings (1945–46)	10–5–6
22	L	January 5, 1946	2–4	@ Montreal Canadiens (1945–46)	10–6–6
23	L	January 6, 1946	2–4	@ New York Rangers (1945–46)	10–7–6
24	L	January 10, 1946	1–2	@ Detroit Red Wings (1945–46)	10–8–6
25	W	January 12, 1946	4–3	Chicago Black Hawks (1945–46)	11–8–6
26	W	January 16, 1946	3–2	New York Rangers (1945–46)	12–8–6
27	W	January 17, 1946	4–2	@ New York Rangers (1945–46)	13–8–6
28	L	January 19, 1946	1–3	@ Montreal Canadiens (1945–46)	13–9–6
29	W	January 20, 1946	3–0	Montreal Canadiens (1945–46)	14–9–6
30	W	January 23, 1946	7–1	Toronto Maple Leafs (1945–46)	15–9–6
31	W	January 26, 1946	4–2	@ Detroit Red Wings (1945–46)	16–9–6
32	L	January 27, 1946	1–4	@ Chicago Black Hawks (1945–46)	16–10–6
33	W	January 30, 1946	4–3	Chicago Black Hawks (1945–46)	17–10–6

February

Game	Result	Date	Score	Opponent	Record
34	W	February 2, 1946	5–3	@ Toronto Maple Leafs (1945–46)	18–10–6
35	L	February 3, 1946	1–3	@ Chicago Black Hawks (1945–46)	18–11–6
36	T	February 6, 1946	3–3	Toronto Maple Leafs (1945–46)	18–11–7
37	L	February 10, 1946	0–2	Montreal Canadiens (1945–46)	18–12–7
38	W	February 13, 1946	3–0	Detroit Red Wings (1945–46)	19–12–7
39	T	February 14, 1946	2–2	@ New York Rangers (1945–46)	19–12–8
40	L	February 16, 1946	2–6	New York Rangers (1945–46)	19–13–8
41	L	February 20, 1946	3–4	@ Chicago Black Hawks (1945–46)	19–14–8
42	L	February 23, 1946	2–7	@ Toronto Maple Leafs (1945–46)	19–15–8
43	L	February 24, 1946	3–4	@ Detroit Red Wings (1945–46)	19–16–8
44	W	February 27, 1946	5–3	@ Montreal Canadiens (1945–46)	20–16–8

March

Game	Result	Date	Score	Opponent	Record
45	L	March 3, 1946	3–5	@ Chicago Black Hawks (1945–46)	20–17–8
46	W	March 6, 1946	4–2	Detroit Red Wings (1945–46)	21–17–8
47	W	March 10, 1946	7–3	Toronto Maple Leafs (1945–46)	22–17–8
48	W	March 12, 1946	3–2	@ New York Rangers (1945–46)	23–17–8
49	L	March 13, 1946	3–5	New York Rangers (1945–46)	23–18–8
50	W	March 17, 1946	5–3	Chicago Black Hawks (1945–46)	24–18–8

Legend: Win (2 points) Loss (0 points) Tie (1 point)

== Player statistics ==
=== Regular season ===
Scoring

Player	Pos	GP	G	A	Pts	PIM
Don Gallinger	C	50	17	23	40	18
Woody Dumart	LW	50	22	12	34	2
Bep Guidolin	LW	50	15	17	32	62
Milt Schmidt	C/D	48	13	18	31	21
Herb Cain	LW	48	17	12	29	4
Bill Shill	RW	45	15	12	27	12
Bill Cowley	C	26	12	12	24	6
Terry Reardon	C/RW	49	12	11	23	21
Bobby Bauer	RW	39	11	10	21	4
Jack McGill	C	46	6	14	20	21
Pat Egan	D	41	8	10	18	32
Jack Crawford	D	48	7	9	16	10
Murray Henderson	D	48	4	11	15	30
Jack Church	D	43	2	6	8	28
Ken Smith	LW	23	2	6	8	0
Dit Clapper	RW/D	30	2	3	5	0
Roy Conacher	LW	4	2	1	3	0
Paul Bibeault	G	16	0	0	0	0
Frank Brimsek	G	34	0	0	0	0
Gordie Bruce	LW	5	0	0	0	0
Armand Delmonte	RW	1	0	0	0	0
Fern Flaman	D	1	0	0	0	0
Mike McMahon	D	2	0	0	0	2

Goaltending

Player	MIN	GP	W	L	T	GA	GAA	SO
Frank Brimsek	2040	34	16	14	4	111	3.26	2
Paul Bibeault	960	16	8	4	4	45	2.81	2
Team:	3000	50	24	18	8	156	3.12	4

=== Playoffs ===
Scoring

Player	Pos	GP	G	A	Pts	PIM
Milt Schmidt	C/D	10	3	5	8	2
Bep Guidolin	LW	10	5	2	7	13
Bobby Bauer	RW	10	4	3	7	2
Woody Dumart	LW	10	4	3	7	0
Don Gallinger	C	10	2	4	6	2
Terry Reardon	C/RW	10	4	0	4	2
Bill Cowley	C	10	1	3	4	2
Ken Smith	LW	8	0	4	4	0
Pat Egan	D	10	3	0	3	8
Jack Crawford	D	10	1	2	3	4
Bill Shill	RW	7	1	2	3	2
Murray Henderson	D	10	1	1	2	4
Herb Cain	LW	9	0	2	2	2
Frank Brimsek	G	10	0	0	0	0
Jack Church	D	9	0	0	0	4
Dit Clapper	RW/D	4	0	0	0	0
Roy Conacher	LW	3	0	0	0	0
Jack McGill	C	10	0	0	0	0

Goaltending

Player	MIN	GP	W	L	GA	GAA	SO
Frank Brimsek	651	10	5	5	29	2.67	0
Team:	651	10	5	5	29	2.67	0

Note:

Pos = Position;GP = Games played; G = Goals; A = Assists; Pts = Points; PIM = Penalty minutes; +/- = Plus/minus; PPG = Power-play goals; SHG = Short-handed goals; GWG = Game-winning goals
Pos = Position;GP = Games played; Min, TOI = Minutes played; W = Wins; L = Losses; T,T/OT = Ties; OTL = Overtime losses; GA = Goals-against; GAA = Goals-against average; SO = Shutouts; SA = Shots against; SV = Shots saved;SV% = Save percentage;

== See also ==
- 1945–46 NHL season
