= 1945–46 Detroit Red Wings season =

Sports season

1945–46 Detroit Red Wings
- League: 4th NHL
- 1945–46 record: 20–20–10
- Home record: 16–5–4
- Road record: 4–15–6
- Goals for: 146
- Goals against: 159

Team information
- General manager: Jack Adams
- Coach: Jack Adams
- Captain: Flash Hollett; Sid Abel
- Arena: Detroit Olympia

Team leaders
- Goals: Adam Brown (20)
- Assists: Joe Carveth (18)
- Points: Joe Carveth (35)
- Penalty minutes: Jack Stewart (73)
- Wins: Harry Lumley (20)
- Goals against average: Harry Lumley (3.18)

The 1945–46 Detroit Red Wings season was the Detroit NHL franchise's 20th season of operation.

== Regular season ==
=== Final standings ===
National Hockey League
		GP	W	L	T	GF	GA	DIFF	Pts
1	Montreal Canadiens	50	28	17	5	172	134	+38	61
2	Boston Bruins	50	24	18	8	167	156	+11	56
3	Chicago Black Hawks	50	23	20	7	200	178	+22	53
4	Detroit Red Wings	50	20	20	10	146	159	−13	50
5	Toronto Maple Leafs	50	19	24	7	174	185	−11	45
6	New York Rangers	50	13	28	9	144	191	−47	35

=== Record vs. opponents ===
1945–46 NHL Records
Team	BOS	CHI	DET	MTL	NYR	TOR
Boston	—	4–6	4–3–3	4–5–1	6–3–1	6–1–3
Chicago	6–4	—	3–4–3	4–5–1	5–2–3	5–5
Detroit	3–4–3	4–3–3	—	6–3–1	4–4–2	3–6–1
Montreal	5–4–1	5–4–1	3–6–1	—	8–1–1	7–2–1
New York	3–6–1	2–5–3	4–4–2	1–8–1	—	3–5–2
Toronto	1–6–3	5–5	6–3–1	2–7–1	5–3–2	—

== Schedule and results ==
1945–46 regular season
October

Game	Result	Date	Score	Opponent	Record
1	W	October 28, 1945	7–0	Boston Bruins (1945–46)	1–0–0

November

Game	Result	Date	Score	Opponent	Record
2	L	November 3, 1945	1–3	@ Montreal Canadiens (1945–46)	1–1–0
3	W	November 4, 1945	4–1	New York Rangers (1945–46)	2–1–0
4	W	November 8, 1945	3–2	Toronto Maple Leafs (1945–46)	3–1–0
5	L	November 10, 1945	0–2	@ New York Rangers (1945–46)	3–2–0
6	W	November 11, 1945	4–1	Montreal Canadiens (1945–46)	4–2–0
7	W	November 15, 1945	5–2	Chicago Black Hawks (1945–46)	5–2–0
8	W	November 17, 1945	6–5	@ Toronto Maple Leafs (1945–46)	6–2–0
9	W	November 18, 1945	5–3	@ Chicago Black Hawks (1945–46)	7–2–0
10	L	November 24, 1945	1–2	@ Montreal Canadiens (1945–46)	7–3–0
11	L	November 25, 1945	1–4	New York Rangers (1945–46)	7–4–0

December

Game	Result	Date	Score	Opponent	Record
12	T	December 2, 1945	2–2	@ Boston Bruins (1945–46)	7–4–1
13	W	December 9, 1945	2–1	Montreal Canadiens (1945–46)	8–4–1
14	T	December 12, 1945	2–2	@ Boston Bruins (1945–46)	8–4–2
15	L	December 15, 1945	1–3	@ Toronto Maple Leafs (1945–46)	8–5–2
16	L	December 16, 1945	4–6	@ Chicago Black Hawks (1945–46)	8–6–2
17	L	December 22, 1945	4–6	Chicago Black Hawks (1945–46)	8–7–2
18	T	December 23, 1945	4–4	@ Chicago Black Hawks (1945–46)	8–7–3
19	W	December 25, 1945	6–3	Toronto Maple Leafs (1945–46)	9–7–3
20	W	December 26, 1945	3–2	@ New York Rangers (1945–46)	10–7–3
21	T	December 30, 1945	3–3	Boston Bruins (1945–46)	10–7–4

January

Game	Result	Date	Score	Opponent	Record
22	L	January 1, 1946	0–4	@ Boston Bruins (1945–46)	10–8–4
23	T	January 3, 1946	3–3	New York Rangers (1945–46)	10–8–5
24	W	January 6, 1946	3–2	Chicago Black Hawks (1945–46)	11–8–5
25	W	January 10, 1946	2–1	Boston Bruins (1945–46)	12–8–5
26	L	January 12, 1946	3–9	@ Toronto Maple Leafs (1945–46)	12–9–5
27	W	January 13, 1946	3–1	Montreal Canadiens (1945–46)	13–9–5
28	L	January 20, 1946	1–3	Toronto Maple Leafs (1945–46)	13–10–5
29	L	January 26, 1946	2–4	Boston Bruins (1945–46)	13–11–5
30	L	January 27, 1946	2–5	@ New York Rangers (1945–46)	13–12–5

February

Game	Result	Date	Score	Opponent	Record
31	L	February 2, 1946	1–5	@ Montreal Canadiens (1945–46)	13–13–5
32	W	February 3, 1946	2–0	Montreal Canadiens (1945–46)	14–13–5
33	W	February 7, 1946	4–2	New York Rangers (1945–46)	15–13–5
34	L	February 9, 1946	1–4	@ Toronto Maple Leafs (1945–46)	15–14–5
35	T	February 10, 1946	2–2	Toronto Maple Leafs (1945–46)	15–14–6
36	L	February 13, 1946	0–3	@ Boston Bruins (1945–46)	15–15–6
37	T	February 16, 1946	3–3	Chicago Black Hawks (1945–46)	15–15–7
38	T	February 17, 1946	2–2	@ Chicago Black Hawks (1945–46)	15–15–8
39	W	February 20, 1946	2–1	@ Montreal Canadiens (1945–46)	16–15–8
40	T	February 21, 1946	2–2	@ New York Rangers (1945–46)	16–15–9
41	W	February 24, 1946	4–3	Boston Bruins (1945–46)	17–15–9
42	W	February 28, 1946	4–1	New York Rangers (1945–46)	18–15–9

March

Game	Result	Date	Score	Opponent	Record
43	T	March 2, 1946	3–3	@ Montreal Canadiens (1945–46)	18–15–10
44	W	March 3, 1946	4–2	Montreal Canadiens (1945–46)	19–15–10
45	L	March 6, 1946	2–4	@ Boston Bruins (1945–46)	19–16–10
46	L	March 10, 1946	2–3	@ New York Rangers (1945–46)	19–17–10
47	L	March 13, 1946	4–9	@ Chicago Black Hawks (1945–46)	19–18–10
48	W	March 14, 1946	7–3	Chicago Black Hawks (1945–46)	20–18–10
49	L	March 16, 1946	3–7	@ Toronto Maple Leafs (1945–46)	20–19–10
50	L	March 17, 1946	7–11	Toronto Maple Leafs (1945–46)	20–20–10

Legend: Win (2 points) Loss (0 points) Tie (1 point)

== Playoffs ==
The Boston Bruins finished second in the league with 56 points. The Detroit Red Wings finished fourth with 50 points. This was the fifth playoff meeting between these two teams with Detroit winning the three of the four previous series. They last met in the previous season's Stanley Cup semifinals where the Red Wings won in seven games. Boston won the season's ten-game regular-season series earning eleven of twenty points.

March 19	Detroit Red Wings	1–3	Boston Bruins	Boston Garden	Recap
No scoring		First period	03:11 – sh – Pat Egan (1); 19:05 – Bill Shill (1)
Harry Watson (1) – 07:51		Second period	No scoring
No scoring		Third period	11:43 – Bep Guidolin (1)
Harry Lumley		Goalie stats	Frank Brimsek

March 21	Detroit Red Wings	3–0	Boston Bruins	Boston Garden	Recap
Pat Lundy (1) – 07:32; Jim Conacher (1) – 12:58		First period	No scoring
No scoring		Second period	No scoring
Harry Watson (2) – 19:22		Third period	No scoring
Harry Lumley		Goalie stats	Frank Brimsek

March 24	Boston Bruins	5–2	Detroit Red Wings	Olympia Stadium	Recap
Milt Schmidt (1) – 02:50		First period	No scoring
Woody Dumart (1) – 04:51		Second period	No scoring
Pat Egan (2) – 00:25; Milt Schmidt (2) – 01:51; Woody Dumart (2) – 11:10		Third period	12:42 – Fern Gauthier (1); 13:25 – Carl Liscombe (1)
Frank Brimsek		Goalie stats	Harry Lumley

March 26	Boston Bruins	4–1	Detroit Red Wings	Olympia Stadium	Recap
Bobby Bauer (1) – 02:08; Woody Dumart (3) – 14:54		First period	No scoring
No scoring		Second period	No scoring
Bep Guidolin (2) – 04:08; Terry Reardon (1) – 11:30		Third period	11:00 – Fern Gauthier (2)
Frank Brimsek		Goalie stats	Harry Lumley

March 28	Detroit Red Wings	3–4	OT	Boston Bruins	Boston Garden	Recap
No scoring		First period		07:04 – Bep Guidolin (3); 14:03 – pp – Bobby Bauer (2)
Fern Gauthier (3) – 11:00		Second period		No scoring
Adam Brown (1) – 12:55; Eddie Bruneteau (1) – 19:13		Third period		04:24 – Terry Reardon (2)
No scoring		First overtime period		09:51 – Don Gallinger (1)
Harry Lumley		Goalie stats		Frank Brimsek

Boston won series 4–1

== Player statistics ==
=== Regular season ===
Scoring

Player	Pos	GP	G	A	Pts	PIM
Joe Carveth	RW	48	17	18	35	10
Adam Brown	LW	48	20	11	31	27
Eddie Bruneteau	RW	46	17	12	29	11
Murray Armstrong	C	40	8	18	26	4
Harry Watson	LW	44	14	10	24	4
Carl Liscombe	LW	44	12	9	21	2
Bill Quackenbush	D	48	11	10	21	6
Fern Gauthier	RW	30	9	8	17	6
Ted Lindsay	LW	47	7	10	17	14
Jack Stewart	D	47	4	11	15	73
Flash Hollett	D	38	4	9	13	16
Syd Howe	C/LW	26	4	7	11	9
Mud Bruneteau	RW	28	6	4	10	2
Gerry Couture	RW	43	3	7	10	18
Harold Jackson	D	36	3	4	7	36
Jim Conacher	C	20	1	5	6	10
Pat Lundy	C	4	3	2	5	2
Rollie McLenahan	D	9	2	1	3	10
Roly Rossignol	RW	8	1	2	3	4
Earl Seibert	D	18	0	3	3	18
Sid Abel	C/LW	7	0	2	2	0
Gerry Brown	LW	10	0	1	1	2
Doug McCaig	D	6	0	1	1	12
Les Douglas	C	1	0	0	0	0
John Holota	C	3	0	0	0	0
Harry Lumley	G	50	0	0	0	6

Goaltending

Player	MIN	GP	W	L	T	GA	GAA	SO
Harry Lumley	3000	50	20	20	10	159	3.18	2
Team:	3000	50	20	20	10	159	3.18	2

=== Playoffs ===
Scoring

Player	Pos	GP	G	A	Pts	PIM
Fern Gauthier	RW	5	3	0	3	2
Harry Watson	LW	5	2	0	2	0
Adam Brown	LW	5	1	1	2	0
Jim Conacher	C	5	1	1	2	0
Murray Armstrong	C	5	0	2	2	0
Gerry Couture	RW	5	0	2	2	0
Flash Hollett	D	5	0	2	2	0
Eddie Bruneteau	RW	4	1	0	1	0
Carl Liscombe	LW	4	1	0	1	0
Pat Lundy	C	2	1	0	1	0
Joe Carveth	RW	5	0	1	1	0
Ted Lindsay	LW	5	0	1	1	0
Bill Quackenbush	D	5	0	1	1	0
Sid Abel	C/LW	3	0	0	0	0
Harold Jackson	D	5	0	0	0	6
Harry Lumley	G	5	0	0	0	0
Rollie McLenahan	D	2	0	0	0	0
Jack Stewart	D	5	0	0	0	14

Goaltending

Player	MIN	GP	W	L	GA	GAA	SO
Harry Lumley	310	5	1	4	16	3.10	1
Team:	310	5	1	4	16	3.10	1

Note: GP = Games played; G = Goals; A = Assists; Pts = Points; +/- = Plus-minus PIM = Penalty minutes; PPG = Power-play goals; SHG = Short-handed goals; GWG = Game-winning goals;
MIN = Minutes played; W = Wins; L = Losses; T = Ties; GA = Goals against; GAA = Goals-against average; SO = Shutouts;

== See also ==
- 1945–46 NHL season
