= 1945–46 Montreal Canadiens season =

NHL hockey team season (won Stanley Cup)

1945–46 Montreal Canadiens
- Stanley Cup champions
- Prince of Wales Trophy winners
- League: 1st NHL
- 1945–46 record: 28–17–5
- Home record: 16–6–3
- Road record: 12–11–2
- Goals for: 172
- Goals against: 134

Team information
- General manager: Tommy Gorman
- Coach: Dick Irvin
- Captain: Toe Blake
- Arena: Montreal Forum

Team leaders
- Goals: Toe Blake (29)
- Assists: Elmer Lach (34)
- Points: Toe Blake (50)
- Penalty minutes: Emile Bouchard (52)
- Wins: Bill Durnan (28)
- Goals against average: Bill Durnan (2.60)

The 1945–46 Montreal Canadiens season was the Canadiens' 37th season of play. The Canadiens placed first during the regular season to qualify for the playoffs. The Canadiens defeated the Boston Bruins in the Stanley Cup Finals to win the Stanley Cup for the sixth time.

== Regular season ==
=== Final standings ===
National Hockey League
		GP	W	L	T	GF	GA	DIFF	Pts
1	Montreal Canadiens	50	28	17	5	172	134	+38	61
2	Boston Bruins	50	24	18	8	167	156	+11	56
3	Chicago Black Hawks	50	23	20	7	200	178	+22	53
4	Detroit Red Wings	50	20	20	10	146	159	−13	50
5	Toronto Maple Leafs	50	19	24	7	174	185	−11	45
6	New York Rangers	50	13	28	9	144	191	−47	35

=== Record vs. opponents ===
1945–46 NHL Records
Team	BOS	CHI	DET	MTL	NYR	TOR
Boston	—	4–6	4–3–3	4–5–1	6–3–1	6–1–3
Chicago	6–4	—	3–4–3	4–5–1	5–2–3	5–5
Detroit	3–4–3	4–3–3	—	6–3–1	4–4–2	3–6–1
Montreal	5–4–1	5–4–1	3–6–1	—	8–1–1	7–2–1
New York	3–6–1	2–5–3	4–4–2	1–8–1	—	3–5–2
Toronto	1–6–3	5–5	6–3–1	2–7–1	5–3–2	—

== Schedule and results ==
1945–46 regular season
October

Game	Result	Date	Score	Opponent	Record
1	W	October 27, 1945	8–4	Chicago Black Hawks (1945–46)	1–0–0

November

Game	Result	Date	Score	Opponent	Record
2	W	November 1, 1945	4–2	Toronto Maple Leafs (1945–46)	2–0–0
3	W	November 3, 1945	3–1	Detroit Red Wings (1945–46)	3–0–0
4	L	November 4, 1945	5–6	@ Boston Bruins (1945–46)	3–1–0
5	W	November 10, 1945	5–3	Boston Bruins (1945–46)	4–1–0
6	L	November 11, 1945	1–4	@ Detroit Red Wings (1945–46)	4–2–0
7	W	November 14, 1945	6–1	@ Toronto Maple Leafs (1945–46)	5–2–0
8	W	November 15, 1945	2–0	New York Rangers (1945–46)	6–2–0
9	W	November 17, 1945	7–3	@ New York Rangers (1945–46)	7–2–0
10	L	November 21, 1945	0–3	@ Boston Bruins (1945–46)	7–3–0
11	W	November 24, 1945	2–1	Detroit Red Wings (1945–46)	8–3–0
12	L	November 25, 1945	1–5	@ Chicago Black Hawks (1945–46)	8–4–0

December

Game	Result	Date	Score	Opponent	Record
13	W	December 1, 1945	4–3	New York Rangers (1945–46)	9–4–0
14	W	December 8, 1945	1–0	@ Toronto Maple Leafs (1945–46)	10–4–0
15	L	December 9, 1945	1–2	@ Detroit Red Wings (1945–46)	10–5–0
16	L	December 13, 1945	3–4	Toronto Maple Leafs (1945–46)	10–6–0
17	T	December 15, 1945	3–3	Boston Bruins (1945–46)	10–6–1
18	W	December 16, 1945	4–2	@ New York Rangers (1945–46)	11–6–1
19	T	December 19, 1945	4–4	@ Chicago Black Hawks (1945–46)	11–6–2
20	W	December 23, 1945	4–1	@ Boston Bruins (1945–46)	12–6–2
21	W	December 26, 1945	4–2	@ Toronto Maple Leafs (1945–46)	13–6–2
22	L	December 29, 1945	4–5	Chicago Black Hawks (1945–46)	13–7–2
23	T	December 31, 1945	0–0	@ New York Rangers (1945–46)	13–7–3

January

Game	Result	Date	Score	Opponent	Record
24	W	January 5, 1946	4–2	Boston Bruins (1945–46)	14–7–3
25	L	January 10, 1946	4–5	Toronto Maple Leafs (1945–46)	14–8–3
26	W	January 12, 1946	9–3	New York Rangers (1945–46)	15–8–3
27	L	January 13, 1946	1–3	@ Detroit Red Wings (1945–46)	15–9–3
28	L	January 16, 1946	1–2	Chicago Black Hawks (1945–46)	15–10–3
29	W	January 19, 1946	3–1	Boston Bruins (1945–46)	16–10–3
30	L	January 20, 1946	0–3	@ Boston Bruins (1945–46)	16–11–3
31	L	January 23, 1946	2–7	@ Chicago Black Hawks (1945–46)	16–12–3
32	W	January 26, 1946	5–3	New York Rangers (1945–46)	17–12–3

February

Game	Result	Date	Score	Opponent	Record
33	W	February 2, 1946	5–1	Detroit Red Wings (1945–46)	18–12–3
34	L	February 3, 1946	0–2	@ Detroit Red Wings (1945–46)	18–13–3
35	W	February 9, 1946	6–2	Chicago Black Hawks (1945–46)	19–13–3
36	W	February 10, 1946	2–0	@ Boston Bruins (1945–46)	20–13–3
37	W	February 13, 1946	5–1	@ Chicago Black Hawks (1945–46)	21–13–3
38	W	February 16, 1946	4–2	@ Toronto Maple Leafs (1945–46)	22–13–3
39	W	February 17, 1946	5–4	@ New York Rangers (1945–46)	23–13–3
40	L	February 20, 1946	1–2	Detroit Red Wings (1945–46)	23–14–3
41	W	February 24, 1946	6–2	Toronto Maple Leafs (1945–46)	24–14–3
42	L	February 27, 1946	3–5	Boston Bruins (1945–46)	24–15–3

March

Game	Result	Date	Score	Opponent	Record
43	T	March 2, 1946	3–3	Detroit Red Wings (1945–46)	24–15–4
44	L	March 3, 1946	2–4	@ Detroit Red Wings (1945–46)	24–16–4
45	W	March 6, 1946	7–3	New York Rangers (1945–46)	25–16–4
46	W	March 9, 1946	2–1	@ Toronto Maple Leafs (1945–46)	26–16–4
47	W	March 10, 1946	3–1	@ Chicago Black Hawks (1945–46)	27–16–4
48	T	March 14, 1946	2–2	Toronto Maple Leafs (1945–46)	27–16–5
49	W	March 16, 1946	6–3	Chicago Black Hawks (1945–46)	28–16–5
50	L	March 17, 1946	5–8	@ New York Rangers (1945–46)	28–17–5

Legend: Win (2 points) Loss (0 points) Tie (1 point)

== Playoffs ==
=== Stanley Cup Finals ===
Boston Bruins vs. Montreal Canadiens

Date	Away	Score	Home	Score	Notes
March 30	Boston	3	Montreal	4	OT
April 2	Boston	2	Montreal	3	OT
April 4	Montreal	4	Boston	2	
April 7	Montreal	2	Boston	3	OT
April 9	Boston	3	Montreal	6	

Montreal wins best-of-seven series 4–1.

== Player statistics ==
=== Regular season ===
==== Scoring ====
Player	Pos	GP	G	A	Pts	PIM
Toe Blake	LW	50	29	21	50	2
Maurice Richard	RW	50	27	21	48	50
Elmer Lach	C	50	13	34	47	34
Jimmy Peters	RW	47	11	19	30	10
Billy Reay	C	44	17	12	29	10
Murph Chamberlain	LW	40	12	14	26	42
Buddy O'Connor	C	45	11	11	22	2
Joe Benoit	RW	39	9	10	19	8
Dutch Hiller	LW	45	7	11	18	4
Emile Bouchard	D	45	7	10	17	52
Glen Harmon	D	49	7	10	17	28
Bob Fillion	LW	50	10	6	16	12
Leo Lamoureux	C/D	45	5	7	12	18
Ken Reardon	D	43	5	4	9	45
Ken Mosdell	C	13	2	1	3	8
Gerry Plamondon	LW	6	0	2	2	2
Frank Eddolls	D	8	0	1	1	6
Murdo MacKay	RW/C	5	0	1	1	0
Mike McMahon	D	13	0	1	1	2
Moe White	LW/C	4	0	1	1	2
Paul Bibeault	G	10	0	0	0	0
Bill Durnan	G	40	0	0	0	0
Vic Lynn	LW/D	2	0	0	0	0
Lorrain Thibeault	LW	1	0	0	0	0
Nils Tremblay	C	2	0	0	0	0

==== Goaltending ====
Player	MIN	GP	W	L	T	GA	GAA	SO
Bill Durnan	2400	40	24	11	5	104	2.60	4
Paul Bibeault	600	10	4	6	0	30	3.00	0
Team:	3000	50	28	17	5	134	2.68	4

=== Playoffs ===
==== Scoring ====
Player	Pos	GP	G	A	Pts	PIM
Elmer Lach	C	9	5	12	17	4
Toe Blake	LW	9	7	6	13	5
Maurice Richard	RW	9	7	4	11	15
Bob Fillion	LW	9	4	3	7	6
Murph Chamberlain	LW	9	4	2	6	18
Dutch Hiller	LW	9	4	2	6	2
Ken Mosdell	C	9	4	1	5	6
Buddy O'Connor	C	9	2	3	5	0
Glen Harmon	D	9	1	4	5	0
Jimmy Peters	RW	9	3	1	4	6
Emile Bouchard	D	9	2	1	3	17
Billy Reay	C	9	1	2	3	4
Ken Reardon	D	9	1	1	2	4
Leo Lamoureux	C/D	9	0	2	2	2
Frank Eddolls	D	8	0	1	1	2
Bill Durnan	G	9	0	0	0	0
Gerry Plamondon	LW	1	0	0	0	0

==== Goaltending ====
Player	MIN	GP	W	L	GA	GAA	SO
Bill Durnan	581	9	8	1	20	2.07	0
Team:	581	9	8	1	20	2.07	0

Note:

Pos = Position;GP = Games played; G = Goals; A = Assists; Pts = Points; PIM = Penalty minutes; +/- = Plus/minus; PPG = Power-play goals; SHG = Short-handed goals; GWG = Game-winning goals
Pos = Position;GP = Games played; Min, TOI = Minutes played; W = Wins; L = Losses; T,T/OT = Ties; OTL = Overtime losses; GA = Goals-against; GAA = Goals-against average; SO = Shutouts; SA = Shots against; SV = Shots saved;SV% = Save percentage;

== See also ==
- 1945–46 NHL season
