= Ezra Dumart =

Canadian ice hockey player (1882–1954)

- Born: October 27, 1882 Zurich, Ontario, Canada
- Died: July 23, 1954 (aged 71) Kitchener, Ontario, Canada
- Height: 5 ft 11 in (180 cm)
- Weight: 190 lb (86 kg; 13 st 8 lb)
- Position: Centre
- Shot: Right
- Played for: Berlin Dutchmen; Toronto Tecumsehs
- Playing career: 1905–1913

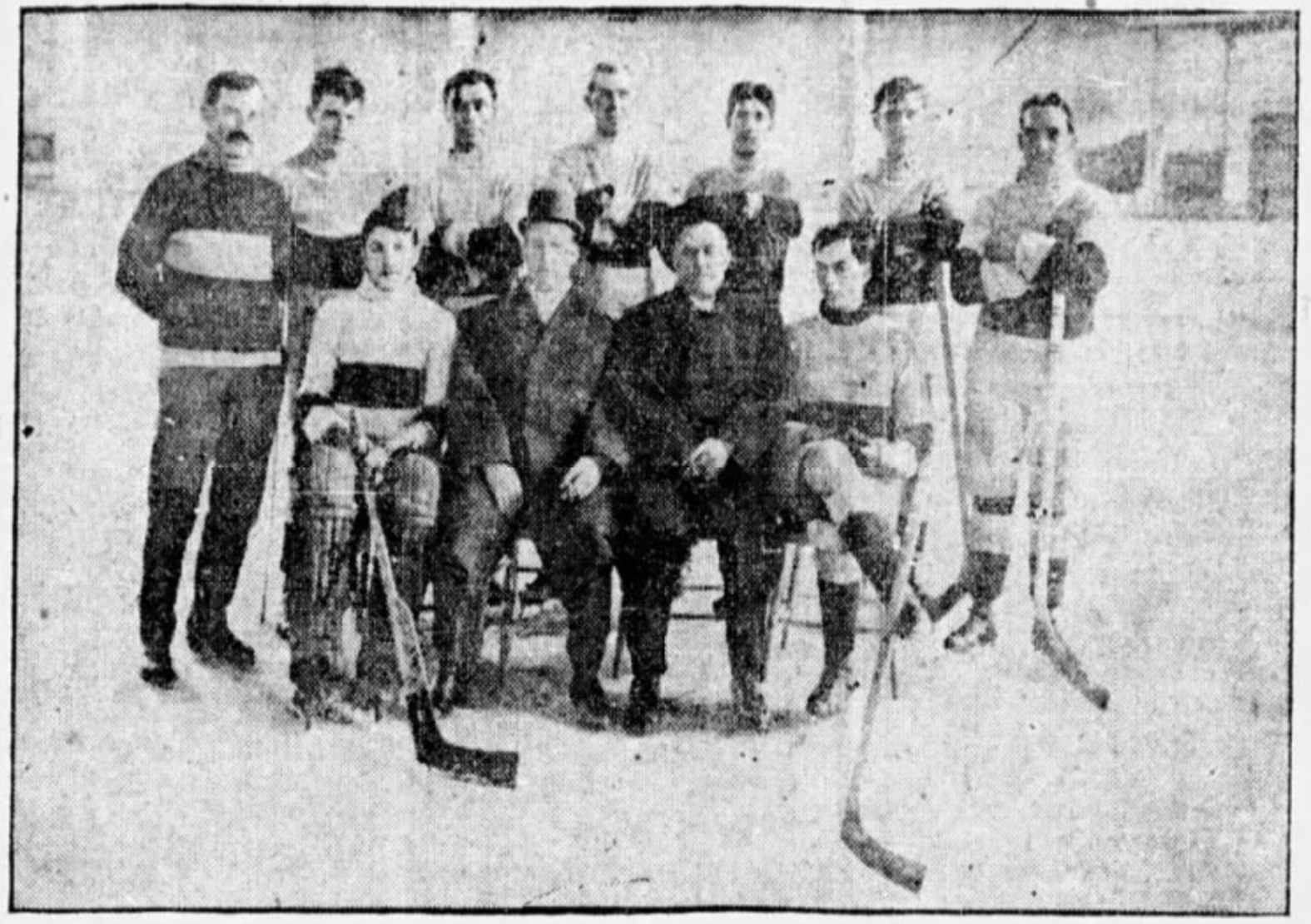
Dumart, standing in the middle of the back row, with the 1909–10 Berlin Dutchmen.

Ezra Garfield Dumart (October 27, 1882 – July 23, 1954) was a Canadian professional ice hockey player. He played with the Toronto Tecumsehs of the National Hockey Association (NHA) in the 1912–1913 season, for one game. He previously played in the Ontario Professional Hockey League (OPHL) with the Berlin Dutchmen.

His nephew, Woody Dumart would also play hockey, with the Boston Bruins from 1937 to 1954. Woody Dumart was inducted into the Hockey Hall of Fame in 1992.
