= 1945–46 Toronto Maple Leafs season =

NHL hockey team season

1945–46 Toronto Maple Leafs
- League: 5th NHL
- 1945–46 record: 19–24–7
- Home record: 10–13–2
- Road record: 9–11–5
- Goals for: 174
- Goals against: 185

Team information
- General manager: Conn Smythe
- Coach: Hap Day
- Captain: Syl Apps
- Arena: Maple Leaf Gardens

Team leaders
- Goals: Gaye Stewart (37)
- Assists: Gus Bodnar (23)
- Points: Gaye Stewart (52)
- Penalty minutes: Bob Goldham (44)
- Wins: Frank McCool (10)
- Goals against average: Turk Broda (3.53)

The 1945–46 Toronto Maple Leafs season was the 29th season of play of the Toronto NHL franchise. Although the club was the defending Stanley Cup champion, the team's play declined and the club finished in fifth, missing the playoffs for the first time since the 1929–30 season.

== Offseason ==
Cup hero goaltender Frank McCool held out. The Maple Leafs decided to play the tandem of Baz Bastien and Gordie Bell.

== Regular season ==
Without Frank McCool, the team only won three of the first thirteen games, and the Leafs and McCool came to terms. The club continued to struggle and only won eight of the first 28 games. Turk Broda returned from war-time duty in January, but the team continued to struggle. All-Star defenceman Babe Pratt was suspended, but was reinstated after nine games. The team won only two of the nine games and dropped out of playoff contention. The club finished in fifth place, out of the playoffs. The team was only the second team to miss the playoffs after winning the Cup.

=== Final standings ===
National Hockey League
		GP	W	L	T	GF	GA	DIFF	Pts
1	Montreal Canadiens	50	28	17	5	172	134	+38	61
2	Boston Bruins	50	24	18	8	167	156	+11	56
3	Chicago Black Hawks	50	23	20	7	200	178	+22	53
4	Detroit Red Wings	50	20	20	10	146	159	−13	50
5	Toronto Maple Leafs	50	19	24	7	174	185	−11	45
6	New York Rangers	50	13	28	9	144	191	−47	35

=== Record vs. opponents ===
1945–46 NHL Records
Team	BOS	CHI	DET	MTL	NYR	TOR
Boston	—	4–6	4–3–3	4–5–1	6–3–1	6–1–3
Chicago	6–4	—	3–4–3	4–5–1	5–2–3	5–5
Detroit	3–4–3	4–3–3	—	6–3–1	4–4–2	3–6–1
Montreal	5–4–1	5–4–1	3–6–1	—	8–1–1	7–2–1
New York	3–6–1	2–5–3	4–4–2	1–8–1	—	3–5–2
Toronto	1–6–3	5–5	6–3–1	2–7–1	5–3–2	—

== Schedule and results ==
1945–46 regular season
October

Game	Result	Date	Score	Opponent	Record
1	T	October 27	1–1	Boston Bruins (1945–46)	0–0–1

November

Game	Result	Date	Score	Opponent	Record
2	L	November 1	2–4	@ Montreal Canadiens (1945–46)	0–1–1
3	L	November 3	1–4	New York Rangers (1945–46)	0–2–1
4	L	November 4	4–7	@ Chicago Black Hawks (1945–46)	0–3–1
5	L	November 7	3–4	Boston Bruins (1945–46)	0–4–1
6	L	November 8	2–3	@ Detroit Red Wings (1945–46)	0–5–1
7	W	November 10	3–2	Chicago Black Hawks (1945–46)	1–5–1
8	L	November 11	3–5	@ Chicago Black Hawks (1945–46)	1–6–1
9	L	November 14	1–6	Montreal Canadiens (1945–46)	1–7–1
10	L	November 17	5–6	Detroit Red Wings (1945–46)	1–8–1
11	W	November 18	3–1	@ New York Rangers (1945–46)	2–8–1
12	W	November 24	4–3	New York Rangers (1945–46)	3–8–1
13	L	November 25	3–5	@ Boston Bruins (1945–46)	3–9–1

December

Game	Result	Date	Score	Opponent	Record
14	L	December 1	2–8	Chicago Black Hawks (1945–46)	3–10–1
15	W	December 2	5–3	@ Chicago Black Hawks (1945–46)	4–10–1
16	L	December 8	0–1	Montreal Canadiens (1945–46)	4–11–1
17	L	December 9	1–2	@ New York Rangers (1945–46)	4–12–1
18	W	December 13	4–3	@ Montreal Canadiens (1945–46)	5–12–1
19	W	December 15	3–1	Detroit Red Wings (1945–46)	6–12–1
20	T	December 16	3–3	@ Boston Bruins (1945–46)	6–12–2
21	T	December 22	5–5	New York Rangers (1945–46)	6–12–3
22	W	December 23	4–3	@ New York Rangers (1945–46)	7–12–3
23	L	December 25	3–6	@ Detroit Red Wings (1945–46)	7–13–3
24	L	December 26	2–4	Montreal Canadiens (1945–46)	7–14–3
25	L	December 29	3–4	Boston Bruins (1945–46)	7–15–3

January

Game	Result	Date	Score	Opponent	Record
26	L	January 1	1–3	@ Chicago Black Hawks (1945–46)	7–16–3
27	L	January 5	0–3	Chicago Black Hawks (1945–46)	7–17–3
28	W	January 10	5–4	@ Montreal Canadiens (1945–46)	8–17–3
29	W	January 12	9–3	Detroit Red Wings (1945–46)	9–17–3
30	W	January 19	3–1	New York Rangers (1945–46)	10–17–3
31	W	January 20	3–1	@ Detroit Red Wings (1945–46)	11–17–3
32	L	January 23	1–7	@ Boston Bruins (1945–46)	11–18–3
33	W	January 26	6–5	Chicago Black Hawks (1945–46)	12–18–3

February

Game	Result	Date	Score	Opponent	Record
34	L	February 2	3–5	Boston Bruins (1945–46)	12–19–3
35	T	February 3	6–6	@ New York Rangers (1945–46)	12–19–4
36	T	February 6	3–3	@ Boston Bruins (1945–46)	12–19–5
37	W	February 9	4–1	Detroit Red Wings (1945–46)	13–19–5
38	T	February 10	2–2	@ Detroit Red Wings (1945–46)	13–19–6
39	L	February 16	2–4	Montreal Canadiens (1945–46)	13–20–6
40	W	February 23	7–2	Boston Bruins (1945–46)	14–20–6
41	L	February 24	2–6	@ Montreal Canadiens (1945–46)	14–21–6
42	L	February 27	4–6	New York Rangers (1945–46)	14–22–6

March

Game	Result	Date	Score	Opponent	Record
43	W	March 2	9–4	Chicago Black Hawks (1945–46)	15–22–6
44	W	March 3	5–2	@ New York Rangers (1945–46)	16–22–6
45	W	March 6	5–2	@ Chicago Black Hawks (1945–46)	17–22–6
46	L	March 9	1–2	Montreal Canadiens (1945–46)	17–23–6
47	L	March 10	3–7	@ Boston Bruins (1945–46)	17–24–6
48	T	March 14	2–2	@ Montreal Canadiens (1945–46)	17–24–7
49	W	March 16	7–3	Detroit Red Wings (1945–46)	18–24–7
50	W	March 17	11–7	@ Detroit Red Wings (1945–46)	19–24–7

Legend: Win (2 points) Loss (0 points) Tie (1 point)

== Player statistics ==
=== Regular season ===
Scoring

Player	GP	G	A	Pts	PIM
Gaye Stewart	50	37	15	52	8
Billy Taylor	48	23	18	41	14
Syl Apps	40	24	16	40	2
Gus Bodnar	49	14	23	37	14
Babe Pratt	41	5	20	25	36
Nick Metz	41	11	11	22	4
Bob Goldham	49	7	14	21	44
Sweeney Schriner	47	13	6	19	15
Bob Davidson	41	9	9	18	12
Jackie Hamilton	40	7	9	16	12
Lorne Carr	42	5	8	13	2
Wally Stanowski	45	3	10	13	10
Mel Hill	35	5	7	12	10
Bill Ezinicki	24	4	8	12	29
Bud Poile	9	1	8	9	0
Moe Morris	38	1	5	6	10
Ted Kennedy	21	3	2	5	4
Ernie Dickens	15	1	3	4	6
Don Metz	7	1	0	1	0
Doug Baldwin	15	0	1	1	6
Jimmy Thomson	5	0	1	1	4
Baz Bastien	5	0	0	0	0
Gordie Bell	8	0	0	0	0
Turk Broda	15	0	0	0	0
Frank McCool	22	0	0	0	5

Goaltending

Player	MIN	GP	W	L	T	GA	GAA	SA	SV	SV%	SO
Frank McCool	1320	22	10	9	3	81	3.68				0
Turk Broda	900	15	6	6	3	53	3.53				0
Gordie Bell	480	8	3	5	0	31	3.87				0
Baz Bastien	300	5	0	4	1	20	4.00				0
Team:	3000	50	19	24	7	185	3.70				0

== Transactions ==
- July 9, 1945: Traded Reg Hamilton to the Chicago Black Hawks for cash and Future Considerations
- September 22, 1945: Acquired Gordie Bell from the Buffalo Bisons of the AHL for cash
- October 16, 1945: Signed Free Agent Jimmy Thomson
- October 29, 1945: Traded Bingo Kampman to the Boston Bruins to complete a previous transaction
- November 6, 1945: Acquired Bingo Kampman from the Boston Bruins as Boston returned player
