= 1945–46 New York Rangers season =

NHL hockey team season

1945–46 New York Rangers
- League: 6th NHL
- 1945–46 record: 13–28–9
- Home record: 8–12–5
- Road record: 5–16–4
- Goals for: 144
- Goals against: 191

Team information
- General manager: Lester Patrick
- Coach: Frank Boucher
- Captain: Neil Colville
- Arena: Madison Square Garden

Team leaders
- Goals: Ab DeMarco (20)
- Assists: Ab DeMarco (27)
- Points: Ab DeMarco (47)
- Penalty minutes: Phil Watson (43)
- Wins: Chuck Rayner (12)
- Goals against average: Chuck Rayner (3.76)

The 1945–46 New York Rangers season was the franchise's 20th season. During the regular season, the Rangers compiled a 13–28–9 record and finished with 35 points. With a fourth consecutive last-place finish, the Rangers did not qualify for the NHL playoffs.

== Regular season ==
=== Final standings ===
National Hockey League
		GP	W	L	T	GF	GA	DIFF	Pts
1	Montreal Canadiens	50	28	17	5	172	134	+38	61
2	Boston Bruins	50	24	18	8	167	156	+11	56
3	Chicago Black Hawks	50	23	20	7	200	178	+22	53
4	Detroit Red Wings	50	20	20	10	146	159	−13	50
5	Toronto Maple Leafs	50	19	24	7	174	185	−11	45
6	New York Rangers	50	13	28	9	144	191	−47	35

=== Record vs. opponents ===
1945–46 NHL Records
Team	BOS	CHI	DET	MTL	NYR	TOR
Boston	—	4–6	4–3–3	4–5–1	6–3–1	6–1–3
Chicago	6–4	—	3–4–3	4–5–1	5–2–3	5–5
Detroit	3–4–3	4–3–3	—	6–3–1	4–4–2	3–6–1
Montreal	5–4–1	5–4–1	3–6–1	—	8–1–1	7–2–1
New York	3–6–1	2–5–3	4–4–2	1–8–1	—	3–5–2
Toronto	1–6–3	5–5	6–3–1	2–7–1	5–3–2	—

== Schedule and results ==
1945–46 regular season
October: 0–1–0 (home: 0-0-0; road: 0–1–0)

Game	October	Opponent	Score	Record
1	31	@ Chicago Black Hawks	5–1	0–1–0

November: 3–8–1 (home: 1–4–0; road: 2–4–1)

Game	November	Opponent	Score	Record
2	3	@ Toronto Maple Leafs	4–1	1–1–0
3	4	@ Detroit Red Wings	4–1	1–2–0
4	8	Chicago Black Hawks	5–4	1–3–0
5	10	Detroit Red Wings	2–0	2–3–0
6	11	Boston Bruins	7–1	2–4–0
7	15	@ Montreal Canadiens	2–0	2–5–0
8	17	Montreal Canadiens	7–3	2–6–0
9	18	Toronto Maple Leafs	3–1	2–7–0
10	22	@ Chicago Black Hawks	3–3	2–7–1
11	24	@ Toronto Maple Leafs	4–3	2–8–1
12	25	@ Detroit Red Wings	4–1	3–8–1
13	28	@ Boston Bruins	5–1	3–9–1

December: 2–7–2 (home: 2–4–1; road: 0–3–1)

Game	December	Opponent	Score	Record
14	1	@ Montreal Canadiens	4–3	3–10–1
15	9	Toronto Maple Leafs	2–1	4–10–1
16	13	Chicago Black Hawks	7–4	4–11–1
17	16	Montreal Canadiens	4–2	4–12–1
18	19	@ Boston Bruins	8–7	4–13–1
19	22	@ Toronto Maple Leafs	5–5	4–13–2
20	23	Toronto Maple Leafs	4–3	4–14–2
21	26	Detroit Red Wings	3–2	4–15–2
22	30	Chicago Black Hawks	3–2	5–15–2
23	31	Montreal Canadiens	0–0	5–15–3

January: 3–6–1 (home: 3–1–0; road: 0–5–1)

Game	January	Opponent	Score	Record
24	3	@ Detroit Red Wings	3–3	5–15–4
25	6	Boston Bruins	4–2	6–15–4
26	12	@ Montreal Canadiens	9–3	6–16–4
27	13	Chicago Black Hawks	3–2	7–16–4
28	16	@ Boston Bruins	3–2	7–17–4
29	17	Boston Bruins	4–2	7–18–4
30	19	@ Toronto Maple Leafs	3–1	7–19–4
31	20	@ Chicago Black Hawks	9–1	7–20–4
32	26	@ Montreal Canadiens	5–3	7–21–4
33	27	Detroit Red Wings	5–2	8–21–4

February: 2–4–5 (home: 0–1–4; road: 2–3–1)

Game	February	Opponent	Score	Record
34	3	Toronto Maple Leafs	6–6	8–21–5
35	6	@ Chicago Black Hawks	6–2	8–22–5
36	7	@ Detroit Red Wings	4–2	8–23–5
37	10	Chicago Black Hawks	2–2	8–23–6
38	14	Boston Bruins	2–2	8–23–7
39	16	@ Boston Bruins	6–2	9–23–7
40	17	Montreal Canadiens	5–4	9–24–7
41	21	Detroit Red Wings	2–2	9–24–8
42	24	@ Chicago Black Hawks	2–2	9–24–9
43	27	@ Toronto Maple Leafs	6–4	10–24–9
44	28	@ Detroit Red Wings	4–1	10–25–9

March: 3–3–0 (home: 2–2–0; road: 1–1–0)

Game	March	Opponent	Score	Record
45	3	Toronto Maple Leafs	5–2	10–26–9
46	6	@ Montreal Canadiens	7–3	10–27–9
47	10	Detroit Red Wings	3–2	11–27–9
48	12	Boston Bruins	3–2	11–28–9
49	13	@ Boston Bruins	5–3	12–28–9
50	17	Montreal Canadiens	8–5	13–28–9

Legend: Win (2 points) Loss (0 points) Tie (1 point)

== Player statistics ==
Skaters

Regular season
Player	GP	G	A	Pts	PIM
Ab DeMarco	50	20	27	47	20
Grant Warwick	45	19	18	37	19
Edgar Laprade	49	15	19	34	0
Phil Watson	49	12	14	26	43
Tony Leswick	50	15	9	24	26
Alf Pike	33	7	9	16	18
Alex Shibicky	33	10	5	15	12
Lynn Patrick	38	8	6	14	30
Mac Colville	39	7	6	13	8
Cal Gardner	16	8	2	10	2
Neil Colville	49	5	4	9	25
Bill Moe	48	4	4	8	14
Rene Trudell	16	3	5	8	4
Hank Goldup	19	6	1	7	11
Ehrhardt Heller	34	2	3	5	14
Church Russell	17	0	5	5	2
Bill Juzda	32	1	3	4	17
Harold Brown	13	2	1	3	2
Hal Laycoe	17	0	2	2	6
Murray Patrick	24	0	2	2	4
Bryan Hextall	3	0	1	1	0
Alan Kuntz	14	0	1	1	2

Goaltenders

Regular season
Player	GP	TOI	W	L	T	GA	GAA	SO
Chuck Rayner	40	2377	12	21	7	149	3.76	1
Jim Henry	11	623	1	7	2	42	4.04	1

^{†}Denotes player spent time with another team before joining Rangers. Stats reflect time with Rangers only.
^{‡}Traded mid-season. Stats reflect time with Rangers only.

Note:

Pos = Position;GP = Games played; G = Goals; A = Assists; Pts = Points; PIM = Penalty minutes; +/- = Plus/minus; PPG = Power-play goals; SHG = Short-handed goals; GWG = Game-winning goals
Pos = Position;GP = Games played; Min, TOI = Minutes played; W = Wins; L = Losses; T,T/OT = Ties; OTL = Overtime losses; GA = Goals-against; GAA = Goals-against average; SO = Shutouts; SA = Shots against; SV = Shots saved;SV% = Save percentage;

== See also ==
- 1945–46 NHL season
