= 1945–46 Chicago Black Hawks season =

NHL ice hockey team season

1945–46 Chicago Blackhawks
- League: 3rd NHL
- 1945–46 record: 23–20–7
- Home record: 15–5–5
- Road record: 8–12–2
- Goals for: 200
- Goals against: 178

Team information
- General manager: Bill Tobin
- Coach: Johnny Gottselig
- Captain: John Mariucci
- Arena: Chicago Stadium

Team leaders
- Goals: Max Bentley (31)
- Assists: Bill Mosienko and Max Bentley (30)
- Points: Max Bentley (61)
- Penalty minutes: John Mariucci (58)
- Wins: Mike Karakas (22)
- Goals against average: Mike Karakas (3.46)

The 1945–46 Chicago Black Hawks season was the teams 20th season in the National Hockey League, and they were coming off a disappointing season in 1944–45, failing to qualify for the playoffs.

With Doug Bentley, Max Bentley, and Red Hamill returning to the team after World War II, the Black Hawks would set a team record by scoring 200 goals, which also led the NHL. The Hawks allowed 178, which ranked them 4th. The Hawks would finish the season with a 23–20–7 record, good for 53 points, which was their highest total since the 1934–35 season, and they would finish in 3rd place in the NHL.

Offensively, the Hawks were led by Max Bentley, who scored a team high 31 goals, and had an NHL high 61 points, while winning the Hart Trophy. Clint Smith had a solid season, registering 50 points, while Bill Mosienko would have 48. Doug Bentley missed 14 games due to injuries, but still finished with 40 points. Team captain John Mariucci would lead the Hawks defensemen with 11 points, and have a team high 58 penalty minutes.

In goal, Mike Karakas would get a majority of the action, earning a career high 22 wins, while posting a 3.46 GAA and a shutout along the way.

The 3rd seeded Hawks would face the 1st place team, the Montreal Canadiens, in a best of 7 series in the opening round of the playoffs. Montreal finished 8 points ahead of the Hawks, and had recently swept Chicago in the 1944 Stanley Cup Finals. The Canadiens once again proved to be too much for the Hawks to handle, as they blew out the Hawks in each of the 4 games they played to sweep the series.

== Season standings ==
National Hockey League
		GP	W	L	T	GF	GA	DIFF	Pts
1	Montreal Canadiens	50	28	17	5	172	134	+38	61
2	Boston Bruins	50	24	18	8	167	156	+11	56
3	Chicago Black Hawks	50	23	20	7	200	178	+22	53
4	Detroit Red Wings	50	20	20	10	146	159	−13	50
5	Toronto Maple Leafs	50	19	24	7	174	185	−11	45
6	New York Rangers	50	13	28	9	144	191	−47	35

=== Record vs. opponents ===
1945–46 NHL Records
Team	BOS	CHI	DET	MTL	NYR	TOR
Boston	—	4–6	4–3–3	4–5–1	6–3–1	6–1–3
Chicago	6–4	—	3–4–3	4–5–1	5–2–3	5–5
Detroit	3–4–3	4–3–3	—	6–3–1	4–4–2	3–6–1
Montreal	5–4–1	5–4–1	3–6–1	—	8–1–1	7–2–1
New York	3–6–1	2–5–3	4–4–2	1–8–1	—	3–5–2
Toronto	1–6–3	5–5	6–3–1	2–7–1	5–3–2	—

== Schedule and results ==
=== Regular season ===
1945–46 regular season
October

Game	Date	Visitor	Score	Home	Record	Points
1	October 24	Chicago Black Hawks	5–4	Boston Bruins	1–0–0	2
2	October 27	Chicago Black Hawks	4–8	Montreal Canadiens	1–1–0	2
3	October 31	New York Rangers	1–5	Chicago Black Hawks	2–1–0	4

November

Game	Date	Visitor	Score	Home	Record	Points
4	November 4	Toronto Maple Leafs	4–7	Chicago Black Hawks	3–1–0	6
5	November 8	Chicago Black Hawks	5–4	New York Rangers	4–1–0	8
6	November 10	Chicago Black Hawks	2–3	Toronto Maple Leafs	4–2–0	8
7	November 11	Toronto Maple Leafs	3–5	Chicago Black Hawks	5–2–0	10
8	November 15	Chicago Black Hawks	2–5	Detroit Red Wings	5–3–0	10
9	November 18	Detroit Red Wings	5–3	Chicago Black Hawks	5–4–0	10
10	November 22	New York Rangers	3–3	Chicago Black Hawks	5–4–1	11
11	November 25	Montreal Canadiens	1–5	Chicago Black Hawks	6–4–1	13

December

Game	Date	Visitor	Score	Home	Record	Points
12	December 1	Chicago Black Hawks	8–2	Toronto Maple Leafs	7–4–1	15
13	December 2	Toronto Maple Leafs	5–3	Chicago Black Hawks	7–5–1	15
14	December 5	Chicago Black Hawks	3–6	Boston Bruins	7–6–1	15
15	December 9	Boston Bruins	3–8	Chicago Black Hawks	8–6–1	17
16	December 13	Chicago Black Hawks	7–4	New York Rangers	9–6–1	19
17	December 16	Detroit Red Wings	4–6	Chicago Black Hawks	10–6–1	21
18	December 19	Montreal Canadiens	4–4	Chicago Black Hawks	10–6–2	22
19	December 22	Chicago Black Hawks	6–4	Detroit Red Wings	11–6–2	24
20	December 23	Detroit Red Wings	4–4	Chicago Black Hawks	11–6–3	25
21	December 29	Chicago Black Hawks	5–4	Montreal Canadiens	12–6–3	27
22	December 30	Chicago Black Hawks	2–3	New York Rangers	12–7–3	27

January

Game	Date	Visitor	Score	Home	Record	Points
23	January 1	Toronto Maple Leafs	1–3	Chicago Black Hawks	13–7–3	29
24	January 5	Chicago Black Hawks	3–0	Toronto Maple Leafs	14–7–3	31
25	January 6	Chicago Black Hawks	2–3	Detroit Red Wings	14–8–3	31
26	January 12	Chicago Black Hawks	3–4	Boston Bruins	14–9–3	31
27	January 13	Chicago Black Hawks	2–3	New York Rangers	14–10–3	31
28	January 16	Chicago Black Hawks	2–1	Montreal Canadiens	15–10–3	33
29	January 20	New York Rangers	1–9	Chicago Black Hawks	16–10–3	35
30	January 23	Montreal Canadiens	2–7	Chicago Black Hawks	17–10–3	37
31	January 26	Chicago Black Hawks	5–6	Toronto Maple Leafs	17–11–3	37
32	January 27	Boston Bruins	1–4	Chicago Black Hawks	18–11–3	39
33	January 30	Chicago Black Hawks	3–4	Boston Bruins	18–12–3	39

February

Game	Date	Visitor	Score	Home	Record	Points
34	February 3	Boston Bruins	1–3	Chicago Black Hawks	19–12–3	41
35	February 6	New York Rangers	2–6	Chicago Black Hawks	20–12–3	43
36	February 9	Chicago Black Hawks	2–6	Montreal Canadiens	20–13–3	43
37	February 10	Chicago Black Hawks	2–2	New York Rangers	20–13–4	44
38	February 13	Montreal Canadiens	5–1	Chicago Black Hawks	20–14–4	44
39	February 16	Chicago Black Hawks	3–3	Detroit Red Wings	20–14–5	45
40	February 17	Detroit Red Wings	2–2	Chicago Black Hawks	20–14–6	46
41	February 20	Boston Bruins	3–4	Chicago Black Hawks	21–14–6	48
42	February 24	New York Rangers	2–2	Chicago Black Hawks	21–14–7	49

March

Game	Date	Visitor	Score	Home	Record	Points
43	March 2	Chicago Black Hawks	4–9	Toronto Maple Leafs	21–15–7	49
44	March 3	Boston Bruins	3–5	Chicago Black Hawks	22–15–7	51
45	March 6	Toronto Maple Leafs	5–2	Chicago Black Hawks	22–16–7	51
46	March 10	Montreal Canadiens	3–1	Chicago Black Hawks	22–17–7	51
47	March 13	Detroit Red Wings	4–9	Chicago Black Hawks	23–17–7	53
48	March 14	Chicago Black Hawks	3–7	Detroit Red Wings	23–18–7	53
49	March 16	Chicago Black Hawks	3–6	Montreal Canadiens	23–19–7	53
50	March 17	Chicago Black Hawks	3–5	Boston Bruins	23–20–7	53

Legend: Win (2 points) Loss (0 points) Tie (1 point)

=== Playoffs ===
1946 Stanley Cup playoffs
Semifinals vs. (1) Montreal Canadiens – Canadiens win 4–0

Game	Date	Visitor	Score	Home	Series
1	March 19	Chicago Black Hawks	2–6	Montreal Canadiens	0–1
2	March 21	Chicago Black Hawks	1–5	Montreal Canadiens	0–2
3	March 24	Montreal Canadiens	8–2	Chicago Black Hawks	0–3
4	March 26	Montreal Canadiens	7–2	Chicago Black Hawks	0–4

Legend: Win Loss

== Season stats ==
=== Scoring leaders ===
Player	GP	G	A	Pts	PIM
Max Bentley	47	31	30	61	6
Clint Smith	50	26	24	50	2
Bill Mosienko	40	18	30	48	12
Alex Kaleta	49	19	27	46	17
Pete Horeck	50	20	21	41	34

=== Goaltending ===
Player	GP	TOI	W	L	T	GA	SO	GAA
Mike Karakas	48	2880	22	19	7	166	1	3.46
Doug Stevenson	2	120	1	1	0	12	0	6.00

== Playoff stats ==
=== Scoring leaders ===
Player	GP	G	A	Pts	PIM
Clint Smith	4	2	1	3	0
Bill Mosienko	4	2	0	2	2
Hully Gee	4	1	1	2	4
Doug Bentley	4	0	2	2	0
Red Hamill	4	1	0	1	7

=== Goaltending ===
Player	GP	TOI	W	L	GA	SO	GAA
Mike Karakas	4	240	0	4	26	0	6.50
