= Don Gallinger =

Canadian ice hockey player

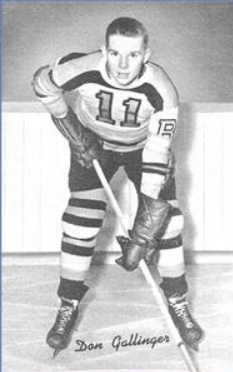
- Gallinger in 1940s photo
- Born: April 10, 1925 Port Colborne, Ontario, Canada
- Died: February 3, 2000 (aged 74) Burlington, Ontario, Canada
- Height: 6 ft 0 in (183 cm)
- Weight: 170 lb (77 kg; 12 st 2 lb)
- Position: Centre
- Shot: Left
- Played for: Boston Bruins
- Playing career: 1942–1948

Donald Calvin Gallinger (April 10, 1925 — February 3, 2000) was a Canadian ice hockey player who played 222 games in the National Hockey League with the Boston Bruins between 1942 and 1948. Born in Port Colborne, Gallinger was one of the league's youngest players when he broke into the NHL, playing on the "Sprout Line" of Boston with Bill Shill and Bep Guidolin. Gallinger's career was cut short when in 1948 Gallinger and former team-mate Billy Taylor were discovered gambling on their teams and banned for life by the NHL. They were reinstated in 1970 and these are the longest suspensions in NHL history. Before the suspension, Gallinger had established himself as an effective offensive NHL player and, as an excellent multi-sport athlete, had even been sought after to play professional baseball.

== Career ==
Don Gallinger came from a hockey family. Gallinger's father, Frank, was a lacrosse player who played hockey in the Northern Hockey League. Don Gallinger had two uncles, "Red" and "Shorty" Green, considered talented players during the era when players played the full 60 minutes. Don's eldest brother, Frank, played senior hockey in Port Colborne. Brother Keith played intermediate hockey.

In junior hockey, Gallinger was team-mates and friends with future Hockey Hall of Fame member Teeder Kennedy. The two were successful in both hockey and football.

Gallinger was the second-youngest player in NHL history when he broke into the NHL with Boston at age 17, playing on the "Sprout Line" with Bill Shill and Bep Guidolin. The Bruins had lost their high-scoring line of Milt Schmidt, Bobby Bauer and Woody Dumart to the Royal Canadian Air Force and NHL teams were willing to accept younger players. Gallinger showed natural ability as a goal-scorer and was third in voting for the Calder rookie of the year award. The Bruins finished in second place in the regular season and went to the Stanley Cup finals losing to the Detroit Red Wings in four straight games.

Gallinger missed a large part of the 1943–44 and all of the 1944–45 season serving with the Canadian military. Before leaving for the military, on January 8, 1944, in a game at Maple Leaf Gardens against the Boston Bruins, the mayor of Port Colborne honoured Kennedy and Gallinger, both hometown heroes, with gold watches on behalf of his town's citizens. Beginning in February 1944, Gallinger played hockey for the R.C.A.F. Bombers. At the time of his entering the military, Gallinger had scored 13 goals in 23 games with Boston. He joined the Royal Canadian Air Force, graduating at the top of his air gunners' class. He was discharged in September 1945 as a flying officer.

Gallinger finished the 1945–46 season leading the Bruins in points. The Bruins finished in second place in the NHL and went to the Stanley Cup finals before losing to the Montreal Canadiens.

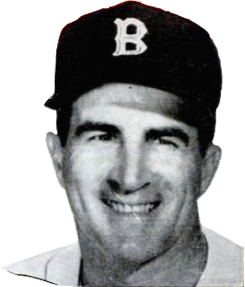
Star shortstop of the Boston Red Sox, Johnny Pesky. Offered a contract by the Sox, Gallinger boasted he was capable of taking Pesky's job.

Gallinger had been offered contracts to play baseball by both the Boston Red Sox and Philadelphia Phillies while he was with the Bruins. In April 1946, Gallinger had a tryout with the Red Sox. Boston sportswriter Bill Grimes said Gallinger "may turn out to be a great shortstop. He can run, he can throw, and he's got good power at the plate. he takes a level cut and hits the ball very sharply." A sportswriter suggested to Gallinger it might be better for him to try for an outfield position since the Red Sox's current shortstop Johnny Pesky was considered the league's best. Gallinger confidently replied that Pesky "beat out somebody else for the job, didn't he?" However, Gallinger turned down the baseball opportunities, because the money offered was not enough.

Gallinger finished the 1946–47 season with 10 points less than his previous year as the NHL strengthened with the return of players who had been serving in the war. The Bruins finished in third place and lost in the opening round of the playoffs to the Montreal Canadiens.

Gallinger twice scored playoff overtime goals for Boston. They occurred on March 21, 1943, versus Montreal and March 28, 1946, versus Detroit. At the time, only Mel Hill had scored multiple playoff overtime goals for Boston. (Hill had three.) No other Bruin would match that feat until Terry O'Reilly did it more than 30 years later.

=== NHL betting scandal ===
==== Background ====
In the 1940s, the most famous betting scandal in North American organised sport was baseball's 1919 World Series. However, gambling was also a problem in professional hockey. In 1946, the NHL discovered a betting ring operating in Maple Leaf Gardens in Toronto. Babe Pratt, a star player with Toronto, was suspended for nine games for betting on his own team. When the betting problem still continued into the next season, the NHL made it clear that any more infractions would receive more severe punishment.

Gallinger had gambled on the Bruins from the time of his rookie year, although he later insisted he never bet on Boston to lose until he met Billy Taylor. Taylor, a 28-year-old center, had arrived to the Bruins in a trade to start the 1947–48 season and was living in the same boarding house as Gallinger. Taylor, who had a reputation for gambling, had heard Gallinger also gambled, and explained to Gallinger how he could double his yearly $7,500 salary by betting on his team to lose. Taylor and Gallinger rationalized that they were not deliberately trying to lose games, since they were only betting on games their team would probably lose anyway. The two became involved with James Tamer, a Detroit gambler and career criminal, and began receiving instructions to bet on games based on their inside knowledge of the team's attitude and injuries. For three months, until the scheme was uncovered, Gallinger bet on eight games, between $250 and $1,000 a game.

==== Betting exposed ====
By early in 1948, Bruins management became suspicious of Taylor's poor play and he was traded to the New York Rangers. In February 1948, Gallinger phoned Tamer before a game in Chicago. The conversation was recorded by a wiretap on Tamer's phone. The conversation as reported in a Detroit newspaper:

Tamer: How are things going tonight?

Voice: Don't worry about the game tonight... I don't intend to do so good. Bet $500 for me.

Gallinger also told Tamer that the Bruins would be without Milt Schmidt in the game. Tamer in turn phoned Taylor in New York to bet $500 on Boston to lose. Although the Bruins won the game against Chicago, Detroit police informed NHL President Clarence Campbell of the wiretaps.

In late February, Gallinger was visiting his family in Port Colborne when he received a call to come to Toronto to be questioned concerning the Detroit gambler. On the train ride to Toronto, Gallinger made the decision he would deny everything to save his father the disgrace. In Toronto, the general manager of the Bruins, Art Ross, was questioning all the Boston players one by one. When it was his turn, Ross told Gallinger he knew he was involved, but Gallinger continued to insist on his innocence. Art Ross then personally approached Gallinger's father and proposed the idea of his son seeing a psychiatrist in Toronto. When his father told him of the idea, Gallinger refused. Years later, Gallinger stated that he regretted the decision as in retrospect he realized that Ross was looking for a way to defend him.

Early in March 1948, word of a gambling scandal involving some Boston Bruin players made its way into the press. The players involved had not yet been named.

On March 3, The Bruins were playing the Chicago Blackhawks at the Boston Garden in their first game since news of the scandal became public. The Boston fans cheered loudly as the Bruin players skated onto the ice. Old-time followers of the Bruins compared the reception to the last time Boston had won the Stanley Cup in 1939. Boston was down 4–1 going into the third period but rallied to tie the game. With the game at 4–3, Don Gallinger brought the puck down the ice, skillfully getting past at least three Blackhawks players in the process, and passed the puck to Johnny Peirson, who scored his first NHL goal to tie the game.

On March 4, 1948, Walter Winchell named Gallinger as one of the players involved in the gambling scandal. The same day, Montreal sportswriter Dink Carroll spoke with Gallinger after the game between Boston and Montreal. "You probably know what this is about, don't you?" Carroll asks. "Yes, you want to know if I've made any decision about baseball," Gallinger answered. Carroll informed Gallinger that Winchell had just named him as the Boston player involved. "Winchell", said Gallinger. "Do you mean the fellow in New York?" Initially Gallinger appeared too bewildered to comment, but eventually denied the accusations.

On Sunday, March 7, the Bruins were playing the Toronto Maple Leafs in Boston. In the second period, Gallinger intercepted a Gus Mortson clearing pass and let go with a low 30-foot shot past goaltender Turk Broda. It would be Gallinger's last goal in the NHL.

==== Expulsion for life ====
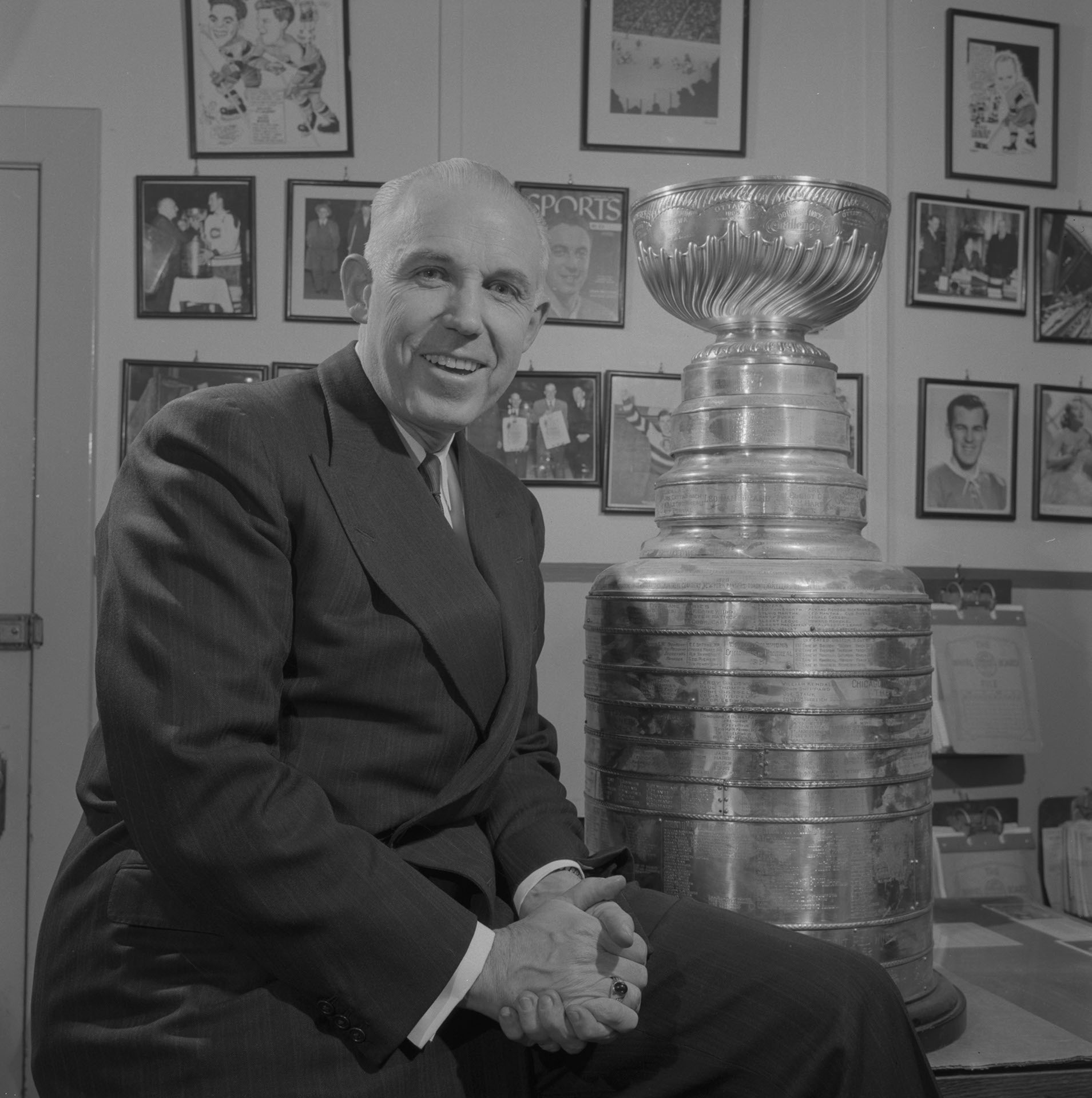
The president of the NHL, Clarence Campbell, banned Gallinger from the NHL for life and refused to lift the ban 15 years later.

On March 9, 1948, Gallinger was suspended indefinitely, pending an investigation, by the NHL for gambling on hockey including games involving the Bruins. NHL President Clarence Campbell said Gallinger and teammate Billy Taylor, who had already been expelled for life, were guilty of "conduct detrimental to hockey and for associating with a known gambler."

On September 28, 1948, Don Gallinger met the same fate as Taylor, receiving a lifetime expulsion from the NHL.

While Gallinger continued to deny his involvement publicly, on October 9, 1949, Gallinger confessed his guilt privately to Campbell. In another player gambling incident in 1946, Babe Pratt had his life-time suspension, also for gambling, reversed after nine games when he freely admitted his guilt to then-NHL president Red Dutton. However, Campbell did not grant Gallinger similar leniency. Years later, Gallinger stated that Campbell had advised him not to reveal to anyone that he had confessed. Campbell, when asked, denied that he had ever advised this to Gallinger. After the Babe Pratt gambling incident, the NHL board changed their constitution to eliminate a player's right to appeal if found guilty of gambling on a game's outcome.

==== Attempts to have the ban lifted ====
In January 1963, the Toronto newspaper The Globe and Mail ran a series on Gallinger and the betting scandal. The series included an in-depth interview by journalist Scott Young with Gallinger and opened the debate about whether Gallinger and Taylor should be reinstated after 15 years. However, Clarence Campbell still strongly opposed reinstatement and the suspension remained.

In 1966, Babe Pratt, found guilty of gambling the season before Gallinger and Taylor, was inducted into the Hockey Hall of Fame.

In 1970, the suspension of Taylor and Gallinger was finally lifted. These are the longest suspensions in the history of the NHL. With the suspension lifted, Taylor became a scout for the NHL Pittsburgh Penguins, but Gallinger never returned to the NHL. However, according to Gallinger's son, Don Gallinger Jr., the lifting of the ban served to give his father peace of mind.

== Personal life ==
Don Gallinger grew up and played sports in Port Colborne, Ontario. He was the youngest of six children. He was childhood friends with Toronto Maple Leafs' captain Teeder Kennedy.

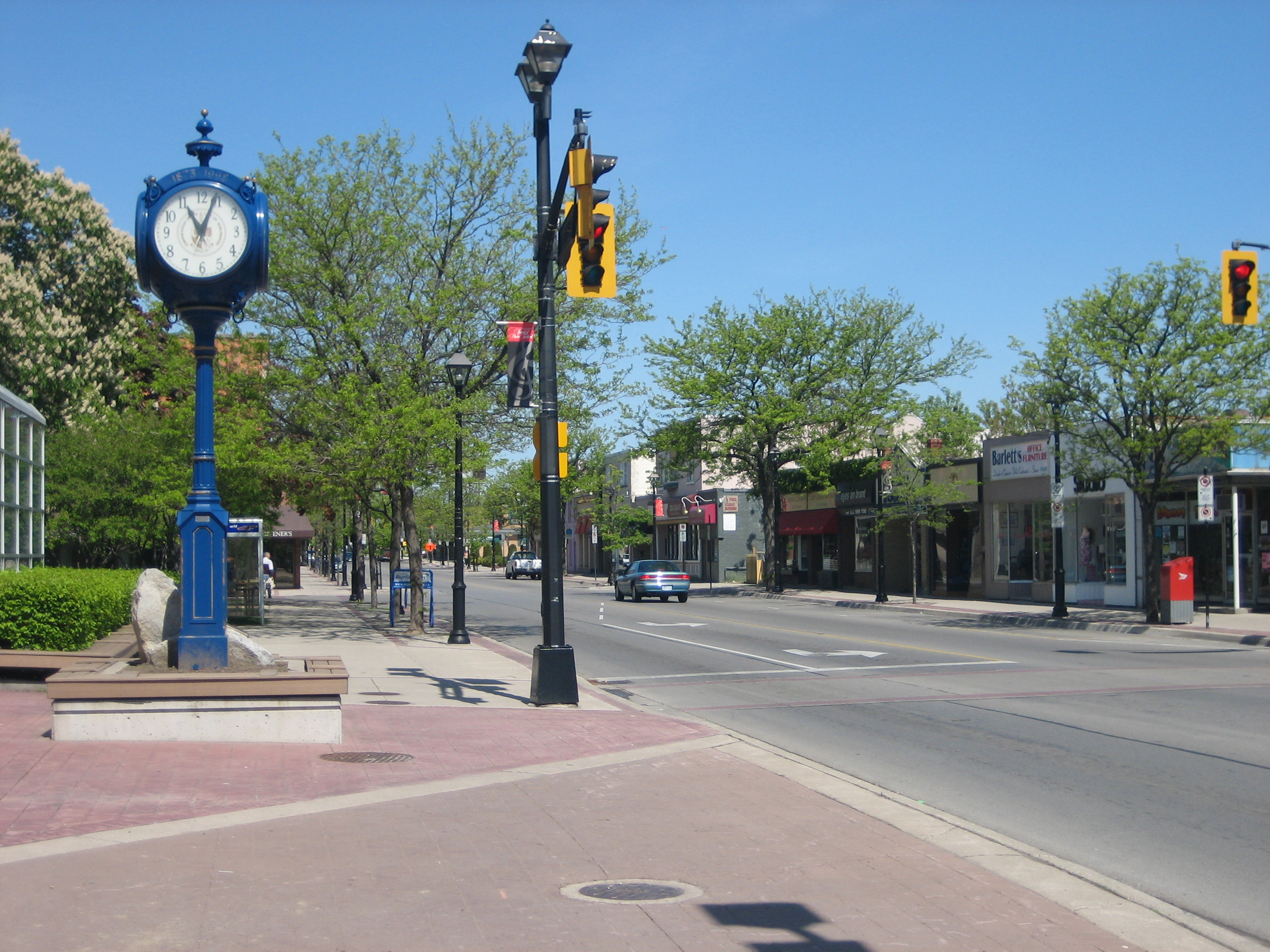
Burlington, Ontario where Gallinger spent the last 30 years of his life. It was also where a son, given up for adoption at birth 51 years earlier, tracked down and later united with Gallinger.

After being suspended by the NHL, Gallinger moved to Kitchener, Ontario where he met and married Kathleen Wagner. The couple had three boys and another child, Randy Kathleen, who died at age 11 at Sick Kids Hospital in Toronto. Gallinger and his wife ran several downtown hotels. Gallinger participated in baseball in the early 1950s, captaining the Kitchener-Waterloo Panthers to two championships. He also coached the Junior B teams in Hamilton and Port Colborne in the early 1960s. After Gallinger and his wife separated in the mid-1960s, he moved to Burlington where he lived for 30 years until his death. Kathleen Gallinger died in a car accident at age 41.

=== Lost son reunited ===
In the summer of 1946, Gallinger had an affair with a young Canadian socialite. The affair became more of a scandal when she became pregnant. Her parents sent her off to California as it was unthinkable for an heiress to marry, in her parents' view, a "lowly" hockey player. The boy was born in 1947 in Bell, California, and was immediately put up for adoption. In 1998, the boy, now Bruce Black, a successful San Jose businessman, decided to finally contact his birth father. Black had been told at age 18 by his adoptive parents who his birth father was but lacked the nerve to contact him. Black did not know Gallinger's whereabouts but had met San Jose Sharks radio broadcaster Dan Rusanowsky whose hobby was genealogy research. With Rusanowsky's assistance, he located Gallinger. In late 1998, Black phoned Gallinger and then later took his family to Toronto to meet his father and half-brothers. When Gallinger died in 2000, his obituary included Black as one of his surviving sons.

Don Gallinger died of a heart attack February 3, 2000 at Joseph Brant Hospital in Burlington, Ontario. Gallinger was survived by sons Don, Michael, Kim, and Bruce.

== Career statistics ==
=== Regular season and playoffs ===
			Regular season					Playoffs
Season	Team	League	GP	G	A	Pts	PIM	GP	G	A	Pts	PIM
1939–40	Port Colborne Incos	OHA Int	—	—	—	—	—	3	0	0	0	4
1940–41	Port Colborne Incos	OHA Int	—	—	—	—	—	—	—	—	—	—
1941–42	St. Catharines Teepees	OHA	—	—	—	—	—	—	—	—	—	—
1942–43	Boston Bruins	NHL	48	14	20	34	16	9	3	1	4	10
1943–44	Boston Bruins	NHL	23	13	5	18	6	—	—	—	—	—
1943–44	Toronto Bowsers	TIHL	3	3	4	7	11	9	5	7	12	10
1944–45	Winnipeg RCAF	WSrHL	9	10	5	15	18	4	1	6	7	8
1945–46	Boston Bruins	NHL	50	17	23	40	18	10	2	4	6	2
1946–47	Boston Bruins	NHL	47	11	19	30	12	4	0	0	0	7
1947–48	Boston Bruins	NHL	54	10	21	31	37	—	—	—	—	—
NHL totals			222	65	88	153	89	23	5	5	10	19
