= Adam Brown (ice hockey) =

Scottish-born Canadian ice hockey player

- Born: February 4, 1920 Johnstone, Scotland
- Died: August 9, 1960 (aged 40)
- Height: 5 ft 9 in (175 cm)
- Weight: 175 lb (79 kg; 12 st 7 lb)
- Position: Left wing
- Shot: Left
- Played for: Detroit Red Wings; Chicago Black Hawks; Boston Bruins
- Playing career: 1941–1952

Adam Brown (February 4, 1920 – August 9, 1960) was a Canadian ice hockey forward. He was born in Johnstone, Scotland, but grew up in Hamilton, Ontario.

== Career ==
Brown started his National Hockey League career with the Detroit Red Wings in 1941-42. He won the Stanley Cup with the Wings the following year. On October 28, 1945, Brown became the first player in Detroit history to score a hat trick in an opening night home game. His three goals helped Detroit defeat the Boston Bruins 7–0.

On October 16, 1946, Brown was in the starting lineup for the Wings along with Sid Abel and 18-year-old rookie Gordie Howe, who was appearing in his first NHL game. In the second period, Abel and Brown assisted on a goal by Howe, Howe's first goal in the NHL.

Brown also played with the Chicago Black Hawks and the Boston Bruins. He left the NHL after the 1951–52 season.

== Personal life ==
Brown died in a car accident on August 9, 1960. His son Andy also played in the National Hockey League, as a goaltender.

== Career statistics ==
=== Regular season and playoffs ===
			Regular season					Playoffs
Season	Team	League	GP	G	A	Pts	PIM	GP	G	A	Pts	PIM
1937–38	Hamilton Bengal Cubs	OHA	8	5	1	6	24	—	—	—	—	—
1938–39	Stratford Majors	OHA	25	11	4	15	45	2	1	1	2	2
1939–40	Guelph Biltmores	OHA	20	21	7	28	22	3	2	5	7	2
1940–41	Omaha Knights	AHA	48	18	18	36	33	—	—	—	—	—
1941–42	Detroit Red Wings	NHL	28	6	9	15	15	10	0	2	2	4
1941–42	Indianapolis Capitals	AHL	29	11	19	30	22	—	—	—	—	—
1942–43	Detroit Red Wings	NHL	—	—	—	—	—	6	1	1	2	2
1942–43	Indianapolis Capitals	AHL	55	34	51	85	47	4	3	2	5	4
1943–44	Detroit Red Wings	NHL	50	24	18	42	56	5	0	0	0	8
1944–45	Barriefield Bears	KCHL	—	21	9	30	14	—	—	—	—	—
1944–45	Toronto Tip Tops	TIHL	1	0	3	3	0	—	—	—	—	—
1944–45	Toronto Uptown Tires	TMHL	3	4	0	4	9	2	2	1	3	0
1944–45	Toronto Bowsers	TMHL	—	—	—	—	—	4	6	3	9	0
1945–46	Detroit Red Wings	NHL	48	20	11	31	27	5	1	1	2	0
1946–47	Detroit Red Wings	NHL	22	8	5	13	30	—	—	—	—	—
1946–47	Chicago Black Hawks	NHL	42	11	25	36	57	—	—	—	—	—
1947–48	Chicago Black Hawks	NHL	32	7	10	17	41	—	—	—	—	—
1948–49	Chicago Black Hawks	NHL	58	8	12	20	69	—	—	—	—	—
1949–50	Chicago Black Hawks	NHL	25	2	2	4	16	—	—	—	—	—
1949–50	Kansas City Pla-Mors	USHL	5	2	8	10	0	—	—	—	—	—
1949–50	St. Louis Flyers	AHL	24	13	11	24	9	2	1	0	1	0
1950–51	Chicago Black Hawks	NHL	53	10	12	22	61	—	—	—	—	—
1951–52	Boston Bruins	NHL	33	8	9	17	6	—	—	—	—	—
1951–52	Hershey Bears	AHL	30	14	16	30	22	5	0	1	1	0
1952–53	Hershey Bears	AHL	62	11	25	36	23	3	0	0	0	0
1953–54	Quebec Aces	QHL	70	23	32	55	58	12	3	2	5	12
1954–55	Sudbury Wolves	NOHA	29	15	13	28	8	—	—	—	—	—
NHL totals			391	104	113	217	378	26	4	2	6	14
AHL totals			200	83	122	205	123	17	4	3	7	5

== See also ==
- List of National Hockey League players born in the United Kingdom
