= Buddy O'Connor =

Canadian ice hockey player (1916–1977)

- Hockey Hall of Fame, 1988
- Born: June 21, 1916 Montreal, Quebec, Canada
- Died: August 24, 1977 (aged 61) Montreal, Quebec, Canada
- Height: 5 ft 7 in (170 cm)
- Weight: 145 lb (66 kg; 10 st 5 lb)
- Position: Centre
- Shot: Left
- Played for: Montreal Canadiens; New York Rangers
- Playing career: 1941–1951

Herbert William "Buddy" O'Connor (June 21, 1916 – August 24, 1977) was a Canadian professional ice hockey centre who played for the Montreal Canadiens and New York Rangers in the National Hockey League (NHL) between 1941 and 1951. He won the Hart Trophy and Lady Byng Trophy in 1948.

== Playing career ==
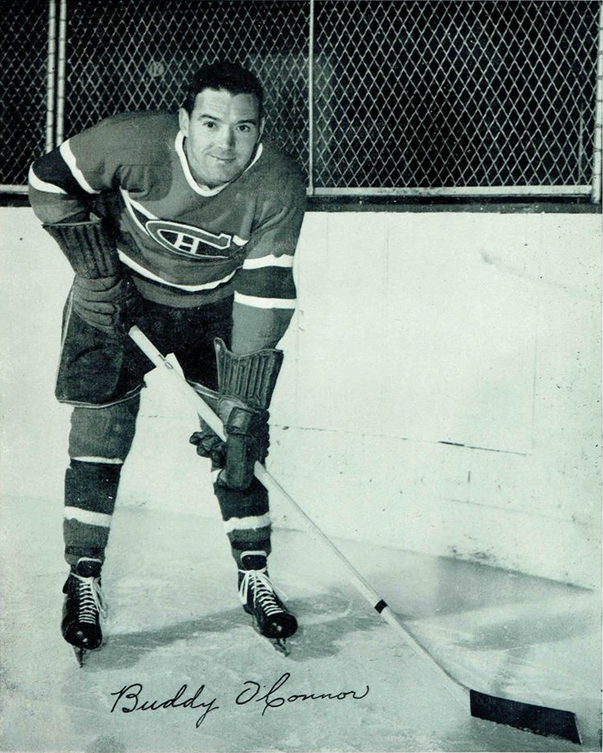
O'Connor in 1940s photo for Montreal Canadiens

O'Connor played for the Montreal Canadiens from 1941 to 1947 and won two Stanley Cups during his career in 1944 and 1946, while playing for the Canadiens.

In 1947, O'Connor was traded to the New York Rangers. He had 60 points that season, finishing second to Montreal's Elmer Lach in the scoring race. He was also awarded the Hart Memorial Trophy and Lady Byng Memorial Trophy and was the first player to win both in the same year. He was also the first Ranger to win the Hart. These achievements were reflected in his being named winner of the Lionel Conacher Award, as Canada's male athlete of the year for 1948.

O'Connor played for the Rangers until 1951. He was inducted into the Hockey Hall of Fame in 1988, becoming the first inductee into the now-defunct Veteran category.

In the 2009 book 100 Ranger Greats, the authors ranked O'Connor at No. 38 all-time of the 901 New York Rangers who had played during the team's first 82 seasons.

== Career statistics ==
=== Regular season and playoffs ===
			Regular season					Playoffs
Season	Team	League	GP	G	A	Pts	PIM	GP	G	A	Pts	PIM
1934–35	Montreal Jr. Royals	QJHL	10	15	7	22	4	2	1	1	2	0
1934–35	Montreal Royals	QSHL	—	—	—	—	—	4	1	0	1	2
1934–35	Montreal Royals	Al-Cup	—	—	—	—	—	1	1	0	1	0
1935–36	Montreal Royals	QSHL	22	14	10	24	6	8	6	5	11	6
1935–36	Montreal Royals	Al-Cup	—	—	—	—	—	4	1	0	1	4
1936–37	Montreal Royals	QSHL	19	10	17	27	27	5	0	4	4	2
1937–38	Montreal Royals	QSHL	22	9	14	23	10	1	0	0	0	0
1938–39	Montreal Royals	QSHL	22	13	23	36	28	5	5	4	9	2
1938–39	Montreal Royals	Al-Cup	—	—	—	—	—	13	10	10	20	15
1939–40	Montreal Royals	QSHL	29	16	25	41	6	8	8	6	14	2
1939–40	Montreal Royals	Al-Cup	—	—	—	—	—	5	5	5	10	6
1940–41	Montreal Royals	QSHL	35	15	38	53	12	8	2	7	9	4
1940–41	Montreal Royals	Al-Cup	—	—	—	—	—	14	6	14	20	4
1941–42	Montreal Canadiens	NHL	36	9	16	25	4	3	0	1	1	0
1941–42	Montreal Royals	QSHL	9	1	5	6	4	—	—	—	—	—
1942–43	Montreal Canadiens	NHL	50	15	43	58	2	5	4	5	9	0
1943–44	Montreal Canadiens	NHL	44	12	42	54	6	8	1	2	3	2
1944–45	Montreal Canadiens	NHL	50	21	23	44	2	2	0	0	0	0
1945–46	Montreal Canadiens	NHL	45	11	11	22	2	9	2	3	5	0
1945–46	Montreal Royals	QSHL	2	0	1	1	0	2	0	2	2	0
1946–47	Montreal Canadiens	NHL	46	10	20	30	6	8	3	4	7	0
1947–48	New York Rangers	NHL	60	24	36	60	8	6	1	4	5	0
1948–49	New York Rangers	NHL	46	11	24	35	0	—	—	—	—	—
1949–50	New York Rangers	NHL	66	11	22	33	4	12	4	2	6	4
1950–51	New York Rangers	NHL	66	16	20	36	0	—	—	—	—	—
1951–52	Cincinnati Mohawks	AHL	65	11	43	54	4	4	2	3	5	2
1952–53	Cincinnati Mohawks	AHL	1	0	0	0	0	—	—	—	—	—
NHL totals			509	140	257	397	34	53	15	21	36	6

== Personal ==
In the mid-1950s, Danny Gallivan was known to assist with the Department of Education's Physical Fitness Division's annual hockey school in PEI, along with NHL chief referee Red Storey and NHL star Buddy O'Connor.

Sporting positions
Preceded by Neil Colville	New York Rangers captain 1949–50	Succeeded by Frank Eddolls
Awards and achievements
Preceded by Maurice Richard	Winner of the Hart Trophy; 1948	Succeeded by Sid Abel
Preceded by Bobby Bauer	Winner of the Lady Byng Trophy; 1948	Succeeded by Bill Quackenbush
