= Bob Fillion =

Canadian ice hockey player

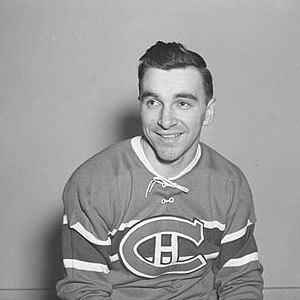
- Born: July 12, 1920; Thetford Mines, Quebec, Canada
- Died: August 13, 2015 (aged 95); Saint-Jean-sur-Richelieu, Quebec, Canada
- Height: 5 ft 10 in (178 cm)
- Weight: 170 lb (77 kg; 12 st 2 lb)
- Position: Left wing
- Shot: Left
- Played for: Montreal Canadiens
- Playing career: 1939–1951

Joseph Louis Robert Edgar Fillion (July 12, 1920 – August 13, 2015) was a Canadian professional ice hockey player who played seven seasons for the Montreal Canadiens of the National Hockey League (NHL) between 1943 and 1950. He was a member of two Stanley Cup-winning teams during his career with Montreal; in 1944 and 1946. He also spent time with the Buffalo Bisons of the AHL and the Sherbrooke Saints of the Quebec Senior Hockey League (QSHL). He died on August 13, 2015. At the time of his death, Fillion was the last surviving member of the Canadiens' 1944 Stanley Cup team.

== Fillion hockey-playing family ==
Born in Thetford Mines, Quebec, Fillion is a member of Thetford Mines' and one of Quebec's most famous hockey families, being one of seven hockey-playing siblings. Right winger Marcel also reached the National Hockey League, playing one game for the Boston Bruins in 1944–1945 and playing in the Eastern Hockey League, the American Hockey League and the Quebec Senior Hockey League from 1944 to 1952. Right winger Dennis played in the United States Hockey League, the Pacific Coast Hockey League, the American Hockey League, the Maritime Major Hockey League, the Quebec Senior Hockey League and the Atlantic Coast Senior League from 1948 to 1956. Defenceman Georges was invited to the Montreal Canadiens training camp at the same time as Bob, but decided to return home to Thetford Mines because he did not speak English very well. He played in the Quebec Senior Hockey League. Nelson, Fernand, and Jean-Marie Fillion also played in the Quebec Senior Hockey League and various Senior Hockey leagues throughout the years. All seven Fillion brothers played on the same team, the Thetford Chappies of the Ligue Intermédiaire de Hockey du Québec during the 1940s. This was where Bob and Georges were spotted by a Canadiens scout.

== Post Hockey ==
Fillion returned to Thetford Mines to work as a manager at the mines, later moving to Saint-Jean-sur-Richelieu and died in Saint-Jean-sur-Richelieu, Quebec.

== Career statistics ==
=== Regular season and playoffs ===
			Regular season					Playoffs
Season	Team	League	GP	G	A	Pts	PIM	GP	G	A	Pts	PIM
1938–39	Verdun Maple Leafs	QJAHA	11	4	12	16	8	3	1	1	2	2
1938–39	Verdun Maple Leafs	M-Cup	—	—	—	—	—	7	4	3	7	10
1939–40	Verdun Maple Leafs	QJAHA	11	10	6	16	6	—	—	—	—	—
1939–40	Verdun Maple Leafs	QSHL	6	0	3	3	0	8	0	2	2	0
1940–41	Shawinigan Falls Cataractes	QSHL	24	10	20	30	25	10	3	6	9	15
1941–42	Shawinigan Falls Cataractes	MDSL	8	1	5	6	4	8	6	6	12	4
1942–43	Montreal Army	QSHL	33	4	13	17	8	7	1	3	4	2
1943–44	Montreal Canadiens	NHL	41	7	23	30	14	3	0	0	0	0
1944–45	Montreal Canadiens	NHL	31	6	8	14	12	1	3	0	3	0
1945–46	Montreal Canadiens	NHL	50	10	6	16	12	9	4	3	7	6
1946–47	Montreal Canadiens	NHL	57	6	3	9	16	8	0	0	0	0
1947–48	Montreal Canadiens	NHL	32	9	9	18	8	—	—	—	—	—
1947–48	Buffalo Bisons	AHL	18	9	9	18	4	—	—	—	—	—
1948–49	Montreal Canadiens	NHL	59	3	9	12	14	7	0	1	1	4
1949–50	Montreal Canadiens	NHL	57	1	3	4	8	5	0	0	0	0
1950–51	Sherbrooke Saints	QSHL	44	15	18	33	45	7	1	1	2	6
NHL totals			327	42	61	103	84	33	7	4	11	10
