= Terry Reardon =

Canadian ice hockey player and coach

- Born: April 6, 1919 Winnipeg, Manitoba, Canada
- Died: February 14, 1993 (aged 73) Kirkland, Quebec, Canada
- Height: 5 ft 10 in (178 cm)
- Weight: 170 lb (77 kg; 12 st 2 lb)
- Position: Center
- Shot: Right
- Played for: Boston Bruins; Montreal Canadiens
- Playing career: 1937–1954

Terrance George Reardon (April 6, 1919 – February 14, 1993) was a Canadian professional ice hockey centre and coach. He played in the National Hockey League with the Boston Bruins and Montreal Canadiens between 1939 and 1947

Reardon played 197 games in the National Hockey League and coached 794 games in the American Hockey League. He played with the Montreal Canadiens and Boston Bruins. Boston engraved his name on the Stanley Cup in 1939, even though he only played four regular season games with the club. Reardon won the Stanley Cup again in 1941 with the Bruins as a full-time member.

His brother, Ken Reardon, played in the NHL with the Montreal Canadiens winning the Stanley Cup in 1946, and is a member of the Hockey Hall of Fame. Terry and Ken faced each other in the 1946 Stanley Cup Final, making them one of the few sets of brothers to do so in the Stanley Cup Finals, and the two even dropped gloves against each other at one point.

== Career statistics ==
=== Regular season and playoffs ===
			Regular season					Playoffs
Season	Team	League	GP	G	A	Pts	PIM	GP	G	A	Pts	PIM
1934–35	East Kildonan North Stars	MAHA	—	—	—	—	—	—	—	—	—	—
1935–36	St. Boniface Seals	MJHL	13	9	3	12	4	—	—	—	—	—
1936–37	St. Boniface Seals	MJHL	16	22	10	32	27	7	8	2	10	17
1937–38	Brandon Wheat Kings	MJHL	16	29	16	45	20	5	5	1	6	6
1938–39	Boston Bruins	NHL	4	0	0	0	0	—	—	—	—	—
1938–39	Hershey Bears	IAHL	50	7	20	27	31	5	1	0	1	2
1939–40	Hershey Bears	IAHL	55	13	24	37	26	4	4	0	4	2
1939–40	Boston Bruins	NHL	—	—	—	—	—	1	0	1	1	0
1940–41	Boston Bruins	NHL	34	6	5	11	19	11	2	4	6	6
1940–41	Hershey Bears	AHL	19	3	8	11	10	—	—	—	—	—
1941–42	Montreal Canadiens	NHL	33	17	17	34	24	3	2	2	4	2
1942–43	Montreal Canadiens	NHL	13	6	6	12	2	—	—	—	—	—
1942–43	Montreal Army	MCHL	19	7	17	24	6	7	4	2	6	2
1945–46	Boston Bruins	NHL	49	12	11	23	21	10	4	0	4	2
1946–47	Boston Bruins	NHL	60	6	14	20	17	5	0	3	3	2
1947–48	Providence Reds	AHL	49	4	10	14	28	5	2	1	3	10
1948–49	Providence Reds	AHL	68	2	10	12	16	14	4	1	5	2
1949–50	Providence Reds	AHL	61	2	9	11	9	1	0	0	0	12
1950–51	Providence Reds	AHL	46	5	16	21	12	—	—	—	—	—
1951–52	Providence Reds	AHL	19	2	6	8	16	11	0	7	7	12
1952–53	Providence Reds	AHL	15	0	2	2	6	—	—	—	—	—
1953–54	Sydney Millionaires	MMHL	58	6	25	31	32	13	0	4	4	2
1954–55	Providence Reds	AHL	15	1	8	9	2	—	—	—	—	—
AHL totals			292	19	69	88	99	31	6	9	15	36
NHL totals			193	47	53	100	83	30	8	10	18	12

== Awards and achievements ==
- MJHL Scoring Champion (1938)
- Stanley Cup Championship (1939, 1941)
- Calder Cup (AHL) Championships (1949 & 1956)
- AHL Coach of the Year (1971)
- Honoured Member of the Manitoba Hockey Hall of Fame
