= Paul Bibeault =

Canadian ice hockey player (1919–1970)

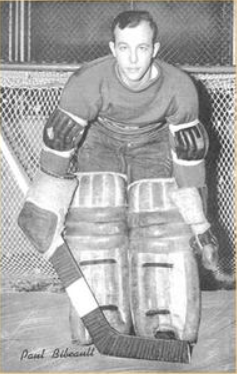
- Bibeault with the Montreal Canadiens, c. 1940s
- Born: April 12, 1919 Montreal, Quebec, Canada
- Died: August 2, 1970 (aged 51) Waterford, New York, U.S.
- Height: 5 ft 9 in (175 cm)
- Weight: 160 lb (73 kg; 11 st 6 lb)
- Position: Goaltender
- Caught: Left
- Played for: Boston Bruins; Chicago Black Hawks; Montreal Canadiens; Toronto Maple Leafs
- Playing career: 1940–1955

Joseph Arsine Paul Emile Albert "Babe" Bibeault (April 12, 1919 – August 2, 1970) was a Canadian ice hockey goaltender who played in the NHL from 1941 to 1947.

== Playing career ==
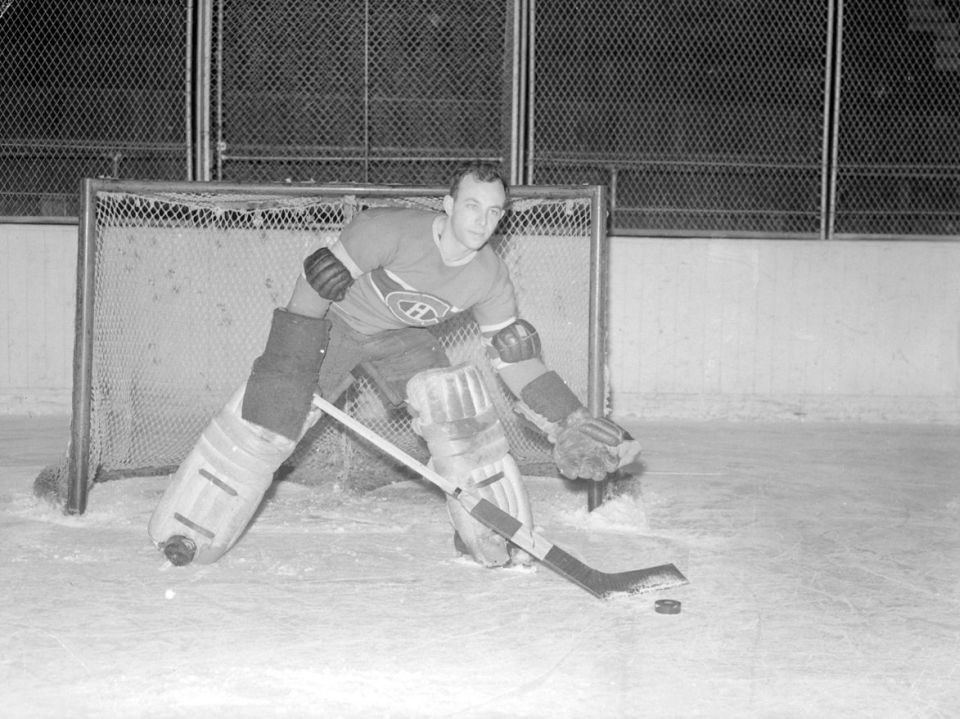
Bibeault at the Montreal Forum in 1942

Born in Montreal, Quebec, Bibeault began his NHL career in the 1940–41 with the Montreal Canadiens. He subsequently played for the Chicago Black Hawks, Toronto Maple Leafs and Boston Bruins. In 1944, he was named to the NHL All-Star team.

== Career statistics ==
=== Regular season and playoffs ===
			Regular season								Playoffs
Season	Team	League	GP	W	L	T	Min	GA	SO	GAA	GP	W	L	Min	GA	SO	GAA
1938–39	Verdun Maple Leafs	QJHL	11	9	0	2	660	23	1	2.09	3	2	1	180	10	0	3.33
1938–39	Verdun Maple Leafs	QSHL	—	—	—	—	—	—	—	—	1	0	1	60	4	0	4.00
1938–39	Verdun Maple Leafs	M-Cup	—	—	—	—	—	—	—	—	7	4	3	420	19	0	2.71
1939–40	Verdun Maple Leafs	QSHL	30	11	11	8	1800	112	0	3.73	8	3	5	480	26	1	3.25
1940–41	Montreal Senior Canadiens	QSHL	34	—	—	—	—	—	0	3.56	—	—	—	—	—	—	—
1940–41	Montreal Canadiens	NHL	4	1	2	0	210	15	0	4.29	—	—	—	—	—	—	—
1941–42	Montreal Canadiens	NHL	38	17	19	2	2380	131	1	3.30	3	1	2	180	8	1	2.67
1941–42	Washington Lions	AHL	13	3	7	3	820	39	0	2.85	—	—	—	—	—	—	—
1942–43	Montreal Canadiens	NHL	50	19	19	12	3010	191	1	3.81	5	1	4	320	18	0	3.38
1943–44	Toronto Maple Leafs	NHL	29	13	14	2	1740	87	5	3.00	5	1	4	300	23	0	4.60
1944–45	Boston Bruins	NHL	27	6	18	2	1530	114	0	4.51	7	3	4	437	22	0	3.02
1945–46	Boston Bruins	NHL	16	8	4	4	960	45	2	2.81	—	—	—	—	—	—	—
1945–46	Montreal Canadiens	NHL	10	4	6	0	600	30	0	3.00	—	—	—	—	—	—	—
1946–47	Chicago Black Hawks	NHL	41	13	25	3	2460	170	1	4.15	—	—	—	—	—	—	—
1946–47	Fort Worth Rangers	USHL	11	—	—	—	660	30	1	2.73	9	4	5	540	30	1	3.33
1947–48	Buffalo Bisons	AHL	25	15	8	2	1500	83	0	3.32	—	—	—	—	—	—	—
1948–49	Dallas Texans	USHL	65	24	26	15	3900	246	2	3.78	4	2	2	240	11	1	2.75
1949–50	Cincinnati Mohawks	AHL	15	7	7	1	900	51	0	3.40	—	—	—	—	—	—	—
1950–51	Cincinnati Mohawks	AHL	18	8	8	1	1099	58	0	3.17	—	—	—	—	—	—	—
1951–52	Cincinnati Mohawks	AHL	16	5	10	1	980	60	0	3.67	1	1	0	94	1	0	0.64
1953–54	Cincinnati Mohawks	AHL	3	—	—	—	180	8	0	2.67	—	—	—	—	—	—	—
1954–55	Cincinnati Mohawks	AHL	2	—	—	—	120	5	0	2.50	—	—	—	—	—	—	—
NHL totals			215	81	107	25	12890	783	10	3.64	20	6	14	1237	71	2	3.44
