= Pat Egan =

Canadian ice hockey player (1918–2008)

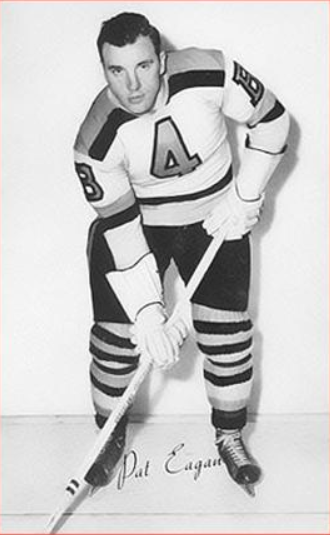
- Egan, c. 1940s
- Born: April 25, 1918 Blackie, Alberta, Canada
- Died: June 3, 2008 (aged 90) Berkeley Heights, New Jersey, U.S.
- Height: 5 ft 10 in (178 cm)
- Weight: 190 lb (86 kg; 13 st 8 lb)
- Position: Defence
- Shot: Right
- Played for: New York Americans; Detroit Red Wings; Boston Bruins; New York Rangers
- Playing career: 1938–1966

Martin Joseph "Pat" Egan (April 25, 1918 – June 3, 2008) was a Canadian ice hockey defenceman, most notably for the Boston Bruins and New York Americans of the National Hockey League. He went on to coach the Springfield Indians of the American Hockey League to three straight Calder Cup championships, the only time that has ever been done.

== Playing career ==
Born in Blackie, Alberta, Egan started his professional career with the Seattle Seahawks of the Pacific Coast Hockey League in 1938, recording 185 penalty minutes in only 44 games. The next season he played mostly for Springfield, but was recalled to make his NHL debut for the New York Americans, playing in ten games that season. He played two more seasons with the Americans' franchise before serving in the military in 1942–43.

Egan was back in pro hockey in the 1944 season, but as the Americans' franchise had folded, his rights were acquired by the Detroit Red Wings. After only half a season with Detroit, the hardrock defenseman was traded to the Boston Bruins for star offensive defenseman Flash Hollett. Egan would anchor the Bruins' defense corps for six seasons in all, before being traded to the New York Rangers in 1949, for whom he would play two seasons.

By 1951, Egan was slowing down, and was sent down to the minor leagues for good. He played nine more years in the minors, principally for the Providence Reds of the AHL, his final action coming in 1959 when he played a few games for the Victoria Cougars of the Western Hockey League. His later minor league career was marred by an incident in November 1952 when he was suspended by the AHL for life for assaulting a linesman; the suspension was lifted a week later.

Egan finished his NHL career with 77 goals and 153 assists for 230 points in 554 games, adding 776 penalty minutes. At the time of his retirement, he was the last New York Americans' player active in professional hockey.

== Coaching career and retirement ==
Egan was tabbed as a coach even while still playing, serving as player-coach of the Reds in 1954 and 1955, and as player-coach of the Nelson Maple Leafs of the senior Western International Hockey League in 1957.

Immediately following his retirement as a player, Egan was hired by Springfield Indians team owner Eddie Shore to coach the club, and the powerful Indians went on to win three straight first-place finishes and three straight Calder Cup championships under his aegis. His tenure under the turbulent Shore lasted three more seasons, but the Indians failed to make the playoffs in any of them, moving on to coach the Jacksonville Rockets of the Eastern Hockey League in 1966. With the team beset by injuries, Egan laced up the skates one final time, playing 19 games with the Rockets at age 47, after which he hung them up for good.

After a final season coaching for the Knoxville Knights of the EHL in 1968, Egan went on to work in Operations for Northeastern University for 22 years until his retirement. Save for the three Calder Cup championship seasons in Springfield, Egan had no other playoff teams in his eleven-year coaching career.

== Achievements and facts ==
- Named an NHL Second Team All-Star on defense in 1942.
- Named to play in the NHL All-Star Game in 1949.
- Elected to the Springfield Hockey Hall of Fame.
- Interred at St. Joseph's Cemetery, West Roxbury, Massachusetts.

== Career statistics ==
=== Regular season and playoffs ===
			Regular season					Playoffs
Season	Team	League	GP	G	A	Pts	PIM	GP	G	A	Pts	PIM
1935–36	Calgary Radios	AAHA	6	1	2	3	14	3	0	0	0	11
1936–37	Nelson Maple Leafs	WKHL	14	2	2	4	14	—	—	—	—	—
1937–38	Sudbury Frood Tigers	NOHA	11	0	0	0	19	2	0	1	1	0
1938–39	Seattle Seahawks	PCHL	44	9	11	20	185	7	1	2	3	25
1939–40	New York Americans	NHL	10	4	3	7	6	2	0	0	0	4
1939–40	Springfield Indians	IAHL	47	12	11	23	74	3	0	0	0	10
1940–41	New York Americans	NHL	39	4	9	13	51	—	—	—	—	—
1941–42	Brooklyn Americans	NHL	48	8	20	28	124	—	—	—	—	—
1942–43	Montreal Army	MCHL	19	6	8	14	56	7	0	0	0	28
1943–44	Detroit Red Wings	NHL	23	4	15	19	40	—	—	—	—	—
1943–44	Boston Bruins	NHL	25	11	13	24	55	—	—	—	—	—
1944–45	Boston Bruins	NHL	48	7	15	22	86	7	2	0	2	6
1945–46	Boston Bruins	NHL	41	8	10	18	32	10	3	0	3	8
1946–47	Boston Bruins	NHL	60	7	18	25	89	5	0	2	2	6
1947–48	Boston Bruins	NHL	60	8	11	19	81	5	1	1	2	2
1948–49	Boston Bruins	NHL	60	6	18	24	92	5	0	0	0	16
1949–50	New York Rangers	NHL	70	5	11	16	50	12	3	1	4	6
1950–51	New York Rangers	NHL	70	5	10	15	70	—	—	—	—	—
1951–52	Cincinnati Mohawks	AHL	36	6	8	14	85	—	—	—	—	—
1951–52	Providence Reds	AHL	32	3	22	25	64	15	2	7	9	49
1952–53	Providence Reds	AHL	26	6	9	15	48	—	—	—	—	—
1953–54	Providence Reds	AHL	70	10	19	29	127	—	—	—	—	—
1954–55	Providence Reds	AHL	59	6	28	34	149	—	—	—	—	—
1955–56	Vancouver Canucks	WHL	70	4	22	26	163	15	0	5	5	20
1956–57	Nelson Maple Leafs	WIHL	36	8	19	27	118	5	0	0	0	11
1957–58	Victoria Cougars	WHL	59	9	27	36	163	—	—	—	—	—
1957–58	Nelson Maple Leafs	WIHL	5	1	1	2	30	—	—	—	—	—
1958–59	Victoria Cougars	WHL	3	0	1	1	4	—	—	—	—	—
AHL/IAHL totals			270	43	97	140	547	18	2	7	9	59
NHL totals			554	77	153	230	776	46	9	4	13	48
