= Woody Dumart =

Canadian ice hockey player (1916–2001)

- Hockey Hall of Fame, 1992
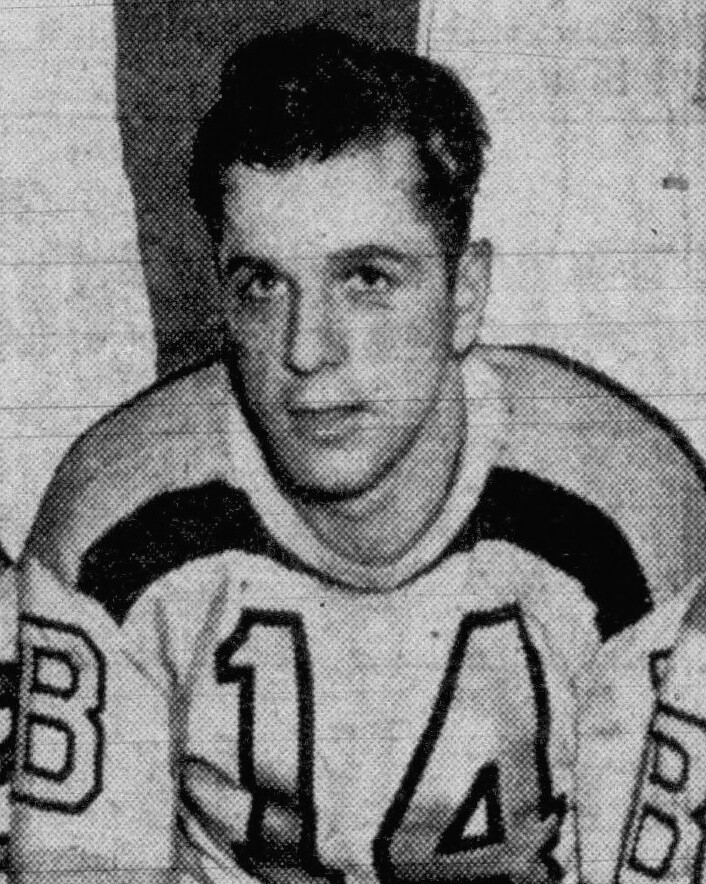
- Dumart, circa 1942
- Born: December 23, 1916 Kitchener, Ontario, Canada
- Died: October 19, 2001 (aged 84) Boston, Massachusetts, U.S.
- Height: 6 ft 1 in (185 cm)
- Weight: 190 lb (86 kg; 13 st 8 lb)
- Position: Left wing
- Shot: Left
- Played for: Boston Bruins
- Playing career: 1935–1954

Woodrow Wilson Clarence Dumart (December 23, 1916 – October 19, 2001) was a Canadian professional ice hockey player, most notably for the Boston Bruins of the National Hockey League (NHL). He was a member of the famed "Kraut Line" with teammates Milt Schmidt and Bobby Bauer. The trio led the Bruins to two Stanley Cup championships and became the first line to finish first, second and third in NHL scoring, in 1939–40. He is an Honoured Member of the Hockey Hall of Fame. Dumart's uncle Ezra Dumart was also a professional ice hockey player.

== Early life ==
Born to Lovina and Henry Dumart on December 23, 1916 Dumart was raised in Berlin now known as Kitchener, Ontario. He was named after the American president at the time, Woodrow Wilson. His family ran a packing supply company called Dumart Packing Company. Dumart began playing the game of hockey at an early age, playing it on the frozen outdoors ponds and sloughs.

Coach Lynn Patrick called him Porky, but he was best known as Woody.

During much of his amateur career he was a defenceman. He played his junior Hockey for the OHA Jr. B Kitchener Empires in 1933, and then the Kitchener Greenshirts of the Ontario Hockey Association on a line with childhood friends Milt Schmidt and Bobby Bauer, which was dubbed the "Kraut line" by Albert Leduc, a defenceman for the Montreal Canadien due to all 3 men having German heritage . All three players were signed by the Boston Bruins,and Dumart was assigned to the Boston Cubs of the Canadian-American Hockey League (CAHL) for the 1935–36 season.

== Professional career ==
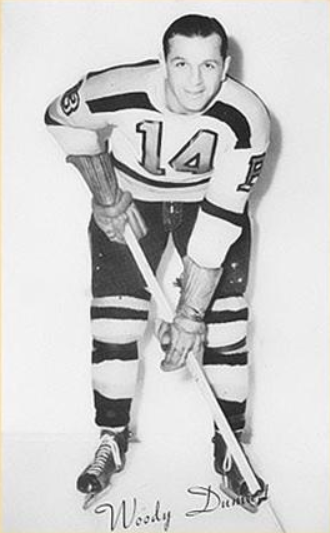
1940s photo of Dumart of Boston Bruins for Beehive Photos

“Woody was one of the truly great Bruins and one of the best players in the NHL in his time. He was a true gentleman and represented the organization well both on and off the ice over many years."

— Harry Sinden

During the 1935-36 season Dumart would appear in 46 games for the Cubs scoring 21 points. He would also make his debut for the Bruins appearing in one game for the team as well during the season. He would then spend the bulk of the 1936–37 seasons in the minor leagues with the Boston Cubs of the Can-Am League, Dumart made the Bruins for good in early 1937. Reunited with Schmidt and Bauer, the trio become one of the most famous lines in hockey history. Dumart scored his first NHL goal on February 21, 1937, in a 2–2 tie versus the Montreal Canadiens at Boston Garden. Dumart – at 6'1", one of the largest wingers of his day – was the skilled checking and defensive component to the line, while contributing good scoring. The trio led the Bruins to the team's first of four consecutive Prince of Wales Trophy wins as the NHL's best team in the regular season. Following a 29-point regular season in 1938–39, Dumart added 4 points in 12 playoff games. The Bruins eliminated the New York Rangers, then defeated the Toronto Maple Leafs four games to one to capture Boston's first Stanley Cup championship in ten years. The following year In 1939–40, Schmidt led the NHL in points with 52 while Dumart and Bauer finished second and third respectively with 43 each. It was the first time in league history that three linemates finished in the top three spots in NHL scoring. This would lead to Dumart being named to the second All-Star team for the first time during the 1939–40 season. The following season Dumart would have another good season scoring 18 goals and 15 assists helping the Bruins win the 1941 Stanley cup. Dumart would then once again be named to the Second All-Star for the 1940–41 season.

Dumart scored his first NHL hat-trick vs the Chicago Black Hawks on December 25, 1939 at Boston Garden in a 6-3 Bruins victory.

Then World War II intervened – leading to the line being renamed, briefly and abortively, the "Kitchener Kids" due to anti-German sentiment – and Dumart enlisted with teammates Schmidt, Bauer and Frank Brimsek. In their final game with the Bruins before deployment, the Kraut Line recorded eight points in a dominating victory over the Montreal Canadiens. Following the contest, players from both teams fêted the trio, hoisting them up on their shoulders and parading them around the ice. Schmidt, Dumart and Bauer were the first NHL players to join the Royal Canadian Air Force, joining halfway through the 1941–42 season while training in Ottawa, they joined the Ottawa RCAF Flyers of the Quebec Senior Hockey League (QSHL). The trio helped the Flyers win the Allan Cup as Canadian senior champions. Dumart scored over a goal a game in leading the team to the title. He played briefly in the fall of 1942 for the Flyers before being shipped overseas, where he served until the end of the war. Dumart and Schmidt would serve as a member of a Bomber squadron and Bauer would serve as a radio technician.

Dumart returned in 1945 reuniting with the Kraut line and played nine more seasons for Boston. Dumart scored 22 goals as the Bruins fell in the Stanley Cup finals. Dumart scorded 24 goals and 28 assists for 52 points in 1947, a personal best, and was named a Second Team All-Star for the third time. This would also lead to Dumart being selected to the play in the 1st annual all star game in 1947. He would also be selected again the following year in 1948 after scoring 21 goals and 16 assists. Dumart would continue to put up solid numbers for the bruins for the next 4 seasons. Scoring 39 points during the 1949-50 season, then in 1950-51, Dumart scored 20 goals and 41 points for the season. He was a constant fan favorite throughout his time with Boston.

On March 26, 1949, Dumart scored a game-winning overtime goal in the Stanley Cup playoffs versus Toronto.

His scoring skills diminishing in his final years, he ended his NHL career with Boston after the 1954 playoffs. He played one last stint the following season with the Providence Reds of the American Hockey League, suiting up for fifteen games before hanging up his skates at last.

== Retirement ==
Dumart retired having played sixteen NHL seasons in all, scoring 211 goals and 218 assists for 429 points in 772 games.

Dumart also got into coaching after retirement serving as the Boston Bruins Jr head coach during the 1961-62 season.

He settled in the Boston area with his wife Nancy, had three children, 10 grandchildren, 3 great grandchildren and remained active with charities, and coached the Bruins' Alumni Association team. For a period of time Dumart also worked as the official scorer during Bruins home games.

On his way to Ray Bourque Night, with his son Jeff Dumart, at the FleetCenter, Woody suddenly became ill with heart trouble and was taken to the hospital, where he died on October 19, 2001.

Dumart remained a legend in his hometown of Kitchener and was later inducted into the Region of Waterloo Hall of fame.

He was inducted into the Hockey Hall of Fame in 1992. Then most recently in 2023 he was named one of the top 100 best Bruins player of all time.

== Achievements ==
- Retired as the leading scoring left wing in Bruins' history and remains fourth in that category, as well as in games played.
- Stanley cup champion in 1939 and 1941
- Elizabeth C. Dufresne Trophy in 1942
- Allan Cup 1942
- Named to the NHL Second All-Star team in 1940, 1941, 1947
- Played in the first two annual NHL All-Star Games, in 1947 and 1948.
- Inducted into the Hockey Hall of Fame in 1992
- Inducted into the Region of Waterloo Hall of Fame
- Named One of the Top 100 Best Bruins Players of all Time.

== Career statistics ==
			Regular season					Playoffs
Season	Team	League	GP	G	A	Pts	PIM	GP	G	A	Pts	PIM
1933–34	Kitchener Empires	OHA-Jr.	12	8	3	11	12	3	1	3	4	0
1934–35	Kitchener Greenshirts	OHA-Jr.	17	17	11	28	10	3	3	1	4	2
1935–36	Boston Bruins	NHL	1	0	0	0	0	—	—	—	—	—
1935–36	Boston Cubs	Can-Am	46	11	10	21	15	—	—	—	—	—
1936–37	Boston Bruins	NHL	17	4	4	8	2	3	0	0	0	0
1936–37	Providence Reds	IAHL	34	4	7	11	10	—	—	—	—	—
1937–38	Boston Bruins	NHL	48	13	14	27	6	3	0	0	0	0
1938–39	Boston Bruins	NHL	46	14	15	29	2	12	1	3	4	6
1939–40	Boston Bruins	NHL	48	22	21	43	16	6	1	0	1	0
1940–41	Boston Bruins	NHL	40	18	15	33	2	11	1	3	4	9
1941–42	Boston Bruins	NHL	35	14	15	29	8	—	—	—	—	—
1941–42	Ottawa RCAF Flyers	OCHL	—	—	—	—	—	6	7	5	12	2
1941–42	Ottawa RCAF Flyers	Al-Cup	—	—	—	—	—	13	14	9	23	8
1942–43	Ottawa RCAF Flyers	OHA-Sr.	6	6	5	11	—	—	—	—	—	—
1942–43	Millward-St. George	Britain	—	—	—	—	—	—	—	—	—	—
1945–46	Boston Bruins	NHL	50	22	12	34	2	10	4	3	7	0
1946–47	Boston Bruins	NHL	60	24	28	52	12	5	1	1	2	8
1947–48	Boston Bruins	NHL	59	21	16	37	14	5	0	0	0	0
1948–49	Boston Bruins	NHL	59	11	12	23	6	5	3	0	3	0
1949–50	Boston Bruins	NHL	69	14	25	39	14	—	—	—	—	—
1950–51	Boston Bruins	NHL	70	20	21	41	7	6	1	2	3	0
1951–52	Boston Bruins	NHL	39	5	8	13	0	7	0	1	1	0
1952–53	Boston Bruins	NHL	62	5	9	14	2	11	0	2	2	0
1953–54	Boston Bruins	NHL	69	4	3	7	6	4	0	0	0	0
1954–55	Providence Reds	AHL	15	2	2	4	0	—	—	—	—	—
NHL totals			772	211	218	429	99	88	12	15	27	23

== See also ==
- List of NHL players who spent their entire career with one franchise
