= Bobby Bauer =

Canadian ice hockey player (1915–1964)

- Hockey Hall of Fame, 1996
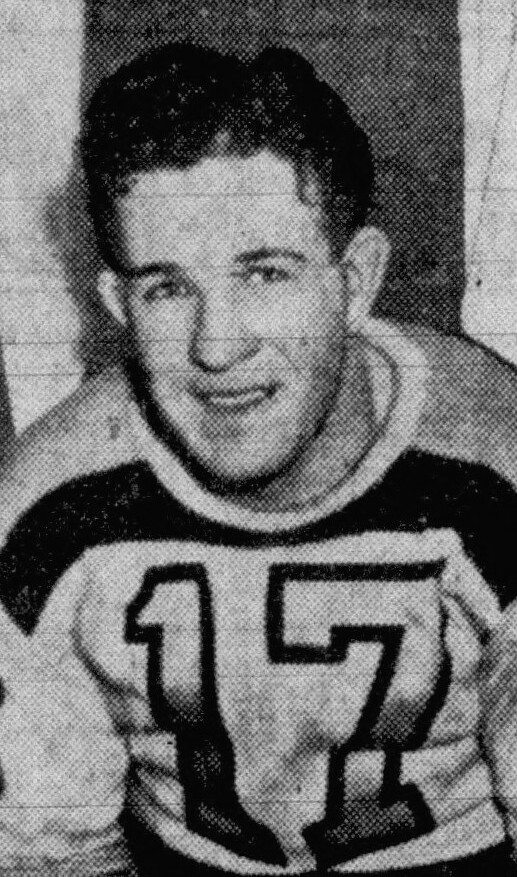
- Bauer, circa 1942
- Born: February 16, 1915 Waterloo, Ontario, Canada
- Died: September 16, 1964 (aged 49) Kitchener, Ontario, Canada
- Height: 5 ft 7 in (170 cm)
- Weight: 160 lb (73 kg; 11 st 6 lb)
- Position: Right wing
- Shot: Right
- Played for: Boston Bruins
- Playing career: 1935–1952

Robert Theodore Bauer (February 16, 1915 – September 16, 1964) was a Canadian professional ice hockey player who was a right winger for 10 seasons in the National Hockey League (NHL) for the Boston Bruins. He was a member of the "Kraut Line" with teammates Milt Schmidt and Woody Dumart. The trio led the Bruins to two Stanley Cup championships and became the first line to finish first, second and third in NHL scoring, in 1939–40. Bauer was named to the All-Star team four times and was a three-time winner of the Lady Byng Trophy, awarded for gentlemanly conduct combined with a high calibre of play. He recorded only 36 penalties in minutes in 327 games.

Prior to his NHL career, Bauer won the Memorial Cup with the St. Michael's Majors in 1934 as junior champions of Canada. He joined the Royal Canadian Air Force in 1942 and won the Allan Cup with the Ottawa RCAF Flyers as senior champions that year. Bauer turned to coaching following his NHL career and guided the Kitchener-Waterloo Dutchmen to two Allan Cup championships. The Dutchmen were sent to represent Canada at the 1956 Winter Olympics where Bauer coached the team to a bronze medal. He also coached the Canadian entry at the 1960 Winter Olympics that won a silver medal. Bauer assisted his brother David in creating the Canadian national hockey team in the 1960s. He was inducted into the Hockey Hall of Fame in 1996.

== Early life ==
Bauer was born on February 16, 1915, in Waterloo, Ontario. He was the second of 11 children to Edgar and Alice Bauer. His elder brother Frank was later Mayor of Waterloo and he had nine younger siblings: Eugene, Jerome, Alice, David, Raymond, Mary, Rita, Therese and Margaret. Edgar was a Knight of the Order of St. Sylvester, Waterloo city councillor and executive in the Bauer family's automotive parts business.

The Bauer children learned to play hockey in a backyard rink, and Bobby grew up playing youth hockey in Kitchener–Waterloo before moving to Toronto in 1930 where he attended St. Michael's College School and played junior first with the St. Michael's Buzzers in 1930–31 followed by three years with the St. Michael's Majors. In 1933–34, Bauer recorded 15 points in 13 Memorial Cup playoff games to help the Majors capture the Dominion junior championship. Bauer played his final year of junior in 1934–35 with the Kitchener Greenshirts where he first played with Milt Schmidt and Woody Dumart, who was then a defenceman.

== Playing career ==
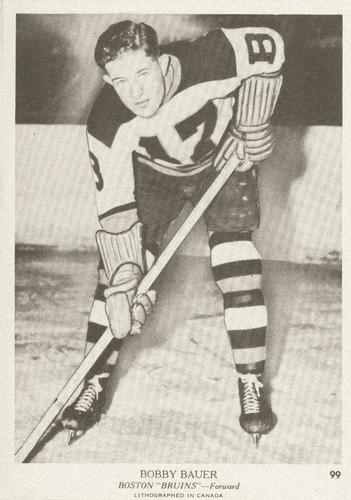
Bauer in 1939 card for Boston Bruins

"He was the brains of the line, always thinking, and a very clever playmaker."

— Woody Dumart

All three players were signed by the Boston Bruins, and Bauer was assigned to the Boston Cubs of the Canadian-American Hockey League (CAHL) for the 1935–36 season. He scored 15 goals for the Cubs in 48 games, then was promoted to the Providence Reds of the International-American Hockey League (IAHL) in 1936–37. It was with the Reds that Bauer as right wing, Schmidt at centre and Dumart, who moved up to left wing, were first placed together as a line. Owing to their shared German heritage, the trio were initially called the "Sauerkrauts" by Providence coach Albert Leduc, though the name was shortened and they were known as the "Kraut Line" for the majority of their careers. Following a season in which Bauer recorded 18 points in 44 games with the Reds, the Bruins recalled him to Boston for the team's final game of the regular season. He made his NHL debut on March 21, 1937, and scored his first goal in a 6–1 victory over the Chicago Black Hawks.

The Kraut Line earned full-time spots in Boston beginning in 1937–38; Bauer recorded a team-leading 20 goals in his rookie season as the trio led the Bruins to the team's first of four consecutive Prince of Wales Trophy wins as the NHL's best team in the regular season. Following a 31-point regular season in 1938–39, Bauer added five points in 12 playoff games and was named to the NHL's second All-Star team. The Bruins eliminated the New York Rangers, then defeated the Toronto Maple Leafs four games to one to capture Boston's first Stanley Cup championship in ten years. In 1939–40, Schmidt led the NHL in points with 52 while Dumart and Bauer finished second and third respectively with 43 each. It was the first time in league history that three linemates finished in the top three spots in NHL scoring. Bauer was again named a second team All-Star, and with only two penalties in minutes (PIM), won the Lady Byng Trophy for the first time.

"Bobby was our team. He was my right arm."

— Milt Schmidt

A 39-point season in 1940–41 with only two PIM earned Bauer his third consecutive appearance on the All-Star team and a second Lady Byng Trophy. In the playoffs, the Bruins reached the 1941 Stanley Cup Final where they defeated the Detroit Red Wings in four straight games. Bauer scored the Stanley Cup-winning goal midway through the second period of a 3–1 victory in the deciding game. Following the outbreak of the Second World War, all three members of the Kraut Line enlisted with the Canadian military by signing up for home defence. At the same time, anti-German sentiment led to efforts to change the trio's nickname. They were briefly called the "Buddy Line" and the "Kitchener Kids", though they were again referred to as the Kraut Line following the war.

The trio were called to active duty in January 1942, forcing them to leave the Bruins midway through the 1941–42 season. In their final game with the Bruins, the Kraut Line recorded eight points in a dominating victory over the Montreal Canadiens. Following the contest, players from both teams fêted the trio, hoisting them up on their shoulders and parading them around the ice. Bauer was overwhelmed by the moment: "The ovation, at the height of my youth, sort of grabbed me." Schmidt, Dumart and Bauer were the first NHL players to join the Royal Canadian Air Force, and while training in Ottawa, they joined the Ottawa RCAF Flyers of the Quebec Senior Hockey League (QSHL). The trio helped the Flyers win the Allan Cup as Canadian senior champions. Bauer was sent to Halifax to continue his training and played with the Dartmouth RCAF team in 1942–43. Bauer, who served as a radio technician, was dispatched to the United Kingdom where he, Schmidt and Dumart were members of a bomber squadron. However, he was returned to Canada in 1944 after being ruled invalid due to a bout of sciatica caused by an old hockey injury. He played with a team in Toronto until the war's conclusion.

Returning to the Bruins for the 1945–46 NHL season, Bauer was reunited with his Kraut Line teammates. Unlike many players who had left for the war, he remained in peak form. However, after scoring 22 points that season, Bauer contemplated retirement. He chose to return for one additional season and was named the Bruins captain for 1946–47. Bauer had his best year in the NHL: he recorded a team-leading 30 goals and finished seventh overall in league scoring with 54 points. He was named to a fourth All-Star team and won the Lady Byng Trophy for the third time. Following the season, he announced his retirement.

== Coaching career ==
Returning to Kitchener, Bauer joined the Bauer Skate Company, his father-in-law's hockey equipment business. He also began his coaching career with the Ontario Hockey Association (OHA)'s Guelph Biltmores and, late in the 1947–48 season, joined the Kitchener-Waterloo Dutchmen in the OHA senior division. After recording 15 points in eight games, Bauer scored 38 and 24 points in the following two seasons and helped the Dutchmen reach the OHA finals in three consecutive years between 1948 and 1950. He again retired as a player in 1950, but came back in 1951–52 for a final season with Kitchener-Waterloo. Late in the season, he also played in one final game with the Bruins. The team was celebrating "Milt Schmidt-Woody Dumart appreciation night" and convinced Bauer to come out of retirement to reunite the Kraut Line for one game on March 18, 1952. The trio were presented gifts in honour of their service to the team and sport. In the contest itself, Bauer scored one goal in a 4–0 victory over Chicago and assisted (along with Dumart) on Schmidt's 200th career goal – at the time a rare feat; Schmidt was one of only five active players at that point to have reached the mark.

Ending his playing career, Bauer became coach, general manager and president of the Dutchmen in 1952. He coached the team to two OHA senior championships and Allan Cup victories: 1952–53 and 1954–55. As the top senior team in the nation, the Dutchmen were sent to Italy to represent Canada at the 1956 Winter Olympics. Bauer was pleased with the way his team adapted to European rules and the Dutchmen were expected to bring home the gold medal. However, the team was shocked by the American entry, a 4–1 loss. Though they still had a chance at gold due to the round robin format of the tournament, the Dutchmen were defeated by the Soviet Union – at the time a relatively unknown and emerging hockey power – by a 2–0 score despite outshooting the Soviets 23–9. Canada was relegated to the bronze medal, at the time the worst finish in the nation's Olympic hockey history.

Bauer retired as a coach following the Olympics. However, the Dutchmen, augmented by players loaned from other teams, were again sent to represent Canada at the 1960 Winter Olympics. The team's coach, Bill Durnan resigned following a six-game losing streak, and after several other candidates were unable to take the necessary time off to coach the squad at the tournament, the Canadian Amateur Hockey Association (CAHA) convinced Bauer to return. The Canadians lost only one game in the tournament, to the United States. The final game of the tournament had been scheduled between Canada and the Soviet Union as it was expected to be the gold medal match-up. However, the Americans won all of their games. Consequently, the match determined the silver medal, which Canada claimed with an 8–5 victory.

== Personal life ==
Bauer partnered in a Guelph-based electronics company and resided in Kitchener with his wife Marguerite and sons Bobby Jr., and Bradley. He also partnered with Woody Dumart in a stick manufacturing company and was a director of the Kitchener Rangers hockey club. His brother, Father David Bauer, convinced CAHA officials in 1962 to abandon the practice of sending a club team to represent Canada internationally in favour of building a true Canadian National Team. Bobby assisted his brother's efforts in creating the team by sharing his coaching knowledge and helping to formulate how the team was to be formed. The first national team played at the 1964 Winter Olympics where it finished a controversial fourth. On September 16, 1964, Bauer suffered a heart attack while golfing and died at the age of 49. He was posthumously inducted into the Hockey Hall of Fame by the veterans committee in 1996.

== Tributes ==
Upon learning of Bauer's death, former Kraut Line member Woody Dumart told the Canadian Press, "There was no better person than Bobby. He gave everything he had. He was the brains of the line, always thinking, and a very clever playmaker." NHL president Clarence Campbell declared, "Bauer was truly an outstanding player. Bobby was a great credit to both professional and amateur hockey."

== Career statistics ==
=== Regular season and playoffs ===
			Regular season					Playoffs
Season	Team	League	GP	G	A	Pts	PIM	GP	G	A	Pts	PIM
1933–34	St. Michael's Majors	OHA	10	4	2	6	0	2	0	1	1	0
1933–34	St. Michael's Majors	M-Cup	—	—	—	—	—	13	10	5	15	0
1934–35	Kitchener Greenshirts	OHA	11	12	6	18	0	3	1	2	3	2
1935–36	Boston Cubs	CAHL	48	15	13	28	4	—	—	—	—	—
1936–37	Boston Bruins	NHL	1	1	0	1	0	1	0	0	0	0
1936–37	Providence Reds	IAHL	44	14	4	18	4	3	0	2	2	0
1937–38	Boston Bruins	NHL	48	20	14	34	9	3	0	0	0	2
1938–39	Boston Bruins	NHL	48	13	18	31	4	12	3	2	5	0
1939–40	Boston Bruins	NHL	48	17	26	43	2	6	1	0	1	2
1940–41	Boston Bruins	NHL	48	17	22	39	2	11	2	2	4	0
1941–42	Boston Bruins	NHL	36	13	22	35	11	—	—	—	—	—
1941–42	Ottawa RCAF Flyers	QSHL	—	—	—	—	—	6	7	6	13	4
1941–42	Ottawa RCAF Flyers	Al-Cup	—	—	—	—	—	5	3	6	9	0
1942–43	Dartmouth RCAF	NSDHL	7	12	8	20	0	5	7	5	12	0
1942–43	Dartmouth RCAF	Al-Cup	—	—	—	—	—	7	2	5	7	0
1944–45	Toronto People's Credit	TIHL	1	1	0	1	0	8	5	5	10	2
1945–46	Boston Bruins	NHL	39	11	10	21	4	10	4	3	7	2
1946–47	Boston Bruins	NHL	58	30	24	54	4	5	1	1	2	0
1947–48	Kitchener-Waterloo Dutchmen	OHA Sr	8	8	7	15	22	10	4	3	7	2
1948–49	Kitchener-Waterloo Dutchmen	OHA Sr	31	17	21	38	13	12	4	4	8	0
1949–50	Kitchener-Waterloo Dutchmen	OHA Sr	23	10	14	24	9	9	1	2	3	2
1951–52	Kitchener-Waterloo Dutchmen	OHA Sr	37	8	10	18	14	1	0	1	1	0
1951–52	Boston Bruins	NHL	1	1	1	2	0	—	—	—	—	—
NHL totals			327	123	137	260	36	48	11	8	19	6

== Awards and honours ==
NHL
Award	Year	Ref.
NHL Second All-Star team	1939, 1940, 1941, 1947	
Stanley Cup champion	1939, 1941	
Lady Byng Trophy	1940, 1941, 1947	
NHL All-Star Game	1947	
Hockey Hall of Fame	1996	
Boston Bruins
Named One of Top 100 Best Bruins Players of all Time	2024	
Elizabeth C. Dufresne Trophy	1942	
Ottawa RCAF Flyers
Allan Cup champion	1942	

Preceded by Clint Smith; Toe Blake	Winner of the Lady Byng Trophy; 1940, 1941; 1947	Succeeded by Syl Apps; Bud O'Connor
Preceded by Jack Crawford	Boston Bruins captain 1946–47	Succeeded by Milt Schmidt
