= 1946–47 Detroit Red Wings season =

Sports season

1946–47 Detroit Red Wings
- League: 4th NHL
- 1946–47 record: 22–27–11
- Home record: 14–10–6
- Road record: 8–17–5
- Goals for: 190
- Goals against: 193

Team information
- General manager: Jack Adams
- Coach: Jack Adams
- Captain: Sid Abel
- Arena: Detroit Olympia

Team leaders
- Goals: Roy Conacher (30)
- Assists: Billy Taylor (46)
- Points: Billy Taylor (63)
- Penalty minutes: Jack Stewart (83)
- Wins: Harry Lumley (22)
- Goals against average: Harry Lumley (3.06)

The 1946–47 Detroit Red Wings season was the Red Wings' 21st season. The season involved Gordie Howe making his National Hockey League debut, and it was the final season for Jack Adams as coach.

== Regular season ==
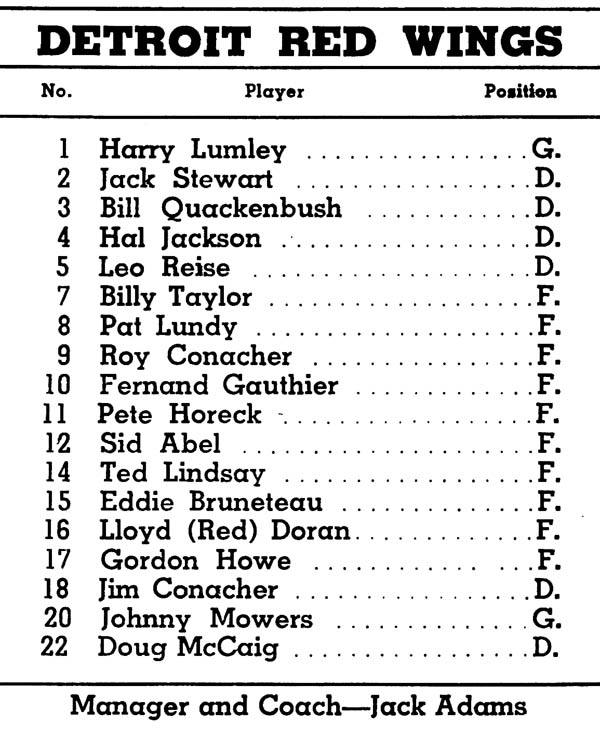
Although famous as #9 during his long career, 18-year-old Gordon Howe actually wore #17 throughout his rookie season with the Detroit Red Wings in 1946–47.

=== Final standings ===
National Hockey League
		GP	W	L	T	GF	GA	DIFF	Pts
1	Montreal Canadiens	60	34	16	10	189	138	+51	78
2	Toronto Maple Leafs	60	31	19	10	209	172	+37	72
3	Boston Bruins	60	26	23	11	190	175	+15	63
4	Detroit Red Wings	60	22	27	11	190	193	−3	55
5	New York Rangers	60	22	32	6	167	186	−19	50
6	Chicago Black Hawks	60	19	37	4	193	274	−81	42

=== Record vs. opponents ===
1946–47 NHL Records
Team	BOS	CHI	DET	MTL	NYR	TOR
Boston	—	6–5–1	6–3–3	1–9–2	7–3–2	5–5–2
Chicago	5–6–1	—	4–7–1	3–8–1	4–8	3–8–1
Detroit	3–6–3	7–4–1	—	4–6–2	6–3–3	2–8–2
Montreal	9–1–2	8–3–1	6–4–2	—	6–5–1	5–3–4
New York	3–7–2	8–4	3–6–3	5–6–1	—	4–8
Toronto	5–5–2	8–3–1	8–2–2	3–5–4	8–4	—

== Schedule and results ==
1946–47 regular season
October

Game	Result	Date	Score	Opponent	Record
1	T	October 16, 1946	3–3	Toronto Maple Leafs (1946–47)	0–0–1
2	L	October 19, 1946	3–6	@ Toronto Maple Leafs (1946–47)	0–1–1
3	L	October 20, 1946	1–3	New York Rangers (1946–47)	0–2–1
4	L	October 23, 1946	5–6	Chicago Black Hawks (1946–47)	0–3–1
5	L	October 26, 1946	2–7	@ Montreal Canadiens (1946–47)	0–4–1
6	W	October 27, 1946	2–1	Montreal Canadiens (1946–47)	1–4–1

November

Game	Result	Date	Score	Opponent	Record
7	L	November 2, 1946	4–7	@ New York Rangers (1946–47)	1–5–1
8	W	November 3, 1946	3–1	New York Rangers (1946–47)	2–5–1
9	T	November 6, 1946	3–3	Boston Bruins (1946–47)	2–5–2
10	W	November 10, 1946	6–3	Montreal Canadiens (1946–47)	3–5–2
11	L	November 13, 1946	2–5	@ Boston Bruins (1946–47)	3–6–2
12	L	November 14, 1946	3–4	@ Montreal Canadiens (1946–47)	3–7–2
13	W	November 17, 1946	5–2	Chicago Black Hawks (1946–47)	4–7–2
14	W	November 20, 1946	8–6	@ Chicago Black Hawks (1946–47)	5–7–2
15	W	November 21, 1946	3–1	New York Rangers (1946–47)	6–7–2
16	W	November 23, 1946	4–2	@ Toronto Maple Leafs (1946–47)	7–7–2
17	L	November 24, 1946	0–5	Toronto Maple Leafs (1946–47)	7–8–2
18	L	November 27, 1946	1–6	Montreal Canadiens (1946–47)	7–9–2
19	L	November 30, 1946	1–4	@ Montreal Canadiens (1946–47)	7–10–2

December

Game	Result	Date	Score	Opponent	Record
20	T	December 1, 1946	3–3	@ Boston Bruins (1946–47)	7–10–3
21	T	December 4, 1946	0–0	@ Chicago Black Hawks (1946–47)	7–10–4
22	L	December 8, 1946	4–5	Toronto Maple Leafs (1946–47)	7–11–4
23	T	December 11, 1946	1–1	@ New York Rangers (1946–47)	7–11–5
24	L	December 15, 1946	2–3	@ Boston Bruins (1946–47)	7–12–5
25	L	December 18, 1946	2–5	@ Chicago Black Hawks (1946–47)	7–13–5
26	L	December 19, 1946	1–3	@ Toronto Maple Leafs (1946–47)	7–14–5
27	L	December 22, 1946	2–4	Montreal Canadiens (1946–47)	7–15–5
28	L	December 25, 1946	1–2	Toronto Maple Leafs (1946–47)	7–16–5
29	T	December 28, 1946	2–2	New York Rangers (1946–47)	7–16–6
30	W	December 31, 1946	5–4	@ New York Rangers (1946–47)	8–16–6

January

Game	Result	Date	Score	Opponent	Record
31	L	January 1, 1947	1–2	@ Toronto Maple Leafs (1946–47)	8–17–6
32	W	January 5, 1947	3–1	Boston Bruins (1946–47)	9–17–6
33	W	January 8, 1947	4–2	@ Montreal Canadiens (1946–47)	10–17–6
34	L	January 9, 1947	4–6	Chicago Black Hawks (1946–47)	10–18–6
35	W	January 12, 1947	5–1	Boston Bruins (1946–47)	11–18–6
36	L	January 15, 1947	3–4	@ New York Rangers (1946–47)	11–19–6
37	L	January 18, 1947	4–7	@ Toronto Maple Leafs (1946–47)	11–20–6
38	T	January 19, 1947	2–2	Montreal Canadiens (1946–47)	11–20–7
39	W	January 23, 1947	8–2	Chicago Black Hawks (1946–47)	12–20–7
40	L	January 26, 1947	3–4	@ Boston Bruins (1946–47)	12–21–7
41	L	January 29, 1947	1–4	@ Boston Bruins (1946–47)	12–22–7

February

Game	Result	Date	Score	Opponent	Record
42	T	February 1, 1947	2–2	Boston Bruins (1946–47)	12–22–8
43	L	February 8, 1947	3–4	@ Montreal Canadiens (1946–47)	12–23–8
44	W	February 9, 1947	5–2	New York Rangers (1946–47)	13–23–8
45	W	February 15, 1947	5–1	Chicago Black Hawks (1946–47)	14–23–8
46	L	February 16, 1947	2–3	@ Chicago Black Hawks (1946–47)	14–24–8
47	W	February 20, 1947	3–0	Boston Bruins (1946–47)	15–24–8
48	W	February 22, 1947	7–3	Montreal Canadiens (1946–47)	16–24–8
49	T	February 23, 1947	2–2	@ New York Rangers (1946–47)	16–24–9
50	T	February 27, 1947	3–3	Toronto Maple Leafs (1946–47)	16–24–10

March

Game	Result	Date	Score	Opponent	Record
51	W	March 1, 1947	5–4	@ Toronto Maple Leafs (1946–47)	17–24–10
52	W	March 2, 1947	3–1	@ Chicago Black Hawks (1946–47)	18–24–10
53	T	March 6, 1947	1–1	@ Montreal Canadiens (1946–47)	18–24–11
54	L	March 9, 1947	0–6	@ Boston Bruins (1946–47)	18–25–11
55	W	March 12, 1947	4–2	@ New York Rangers (1946–47)	19–25–11
56	L	March 13, 1947	2–3	Boston Bruins (1946–47)	19–26–11
57	W	March 15, 1947	8–3	Chicago Black Hawks (1946–47)	20–26–11
58	W	March 16, 1947	10–6	@ Chicago Black Hawks (1946–47)	21–26–11
59	W	March 19, 1947	2–0	New York Rangers (1946–47)	22–26–11
60	L	March 23, 1947	3–5	Toronto Maple Leafs (1946–47)	22–27–11

Legend: Win (2 points) Loss (0 points) Tie (1 point)

== Player statistics ==
=== Regular season ===
Scoring

Player	Pos	GP	G	A	Pts	PIM
Billy Taylor	C	60	17	46	63	35
Roy Conacher	LW	60	30	24	54	6
Sid Abel	C/LW	60	19	29	48	29
Ted Lindsay	LW	59	27	15	42	57
Pat Lundy	C	59	17	17	34	10
Jim Conacher	C	33	16	13	29	2
Pete Horeck	LW	38	12	13	25	59
Eddie Bruneteau	RW	60	9	14	23	14
Gordie Howe	RW	58	7	15	22	52
Bill Quackenbush	D	44	5	17	22	6
Gerry Couture	RW	30	5	10	15	0
Jack Stewart	D	55	5	9	14	83
Adam Brown	LW	22	8	5	13	30
Fern Gauthier	RW	40	1	12	13	2
Leo Reise Jr.	D	31	4	6	10	14
Doug McCaig	D	47	2	4	6	62
Harold Jackson	D	37	1	5	6	39
Lloyd Doran	C	24	3	2	5	10
Al Dewsbury	D	23	2	1	3	12
Les Douglas	C	12	0	2	2	2
Tony Licari	RW	9	0	1	1	0
Cliff Simpson	C	6	0	1	1	0
Red Almas	G	1	0	0	0	0
Doug Baldwin	D	4	0	0	0	0
Harry Lumley	G	52	0	0	0	4
Calum MacKay	LW	5	0	0	0	0
Hugh Millar	D	4	0	0	0	0
Johnny Mowers	G	7	0	0	0	2
Thain Simon	D	3	0	0	0	0
Steve Wojciechowski	RW	5	0	0	0	0

Goaltending

Player	MIN	GP	W	L	T	GA	GAA	SO
Harry Lumley	3120	52	22	20	10	159	3.06	3
Red Almas	60	1	0	1	0	5	5.00	0
Johnny Mowers	420	7	0	6	1	29	4.14	0
Team:	3600	60	22	27	11	193	3.22	3

=== Playoffs ===
Scoring

Player	Pos	GP	G	A	Pts	PIM
Roy Conacher	LW	5	4	4	8	2
Billy Taylor	C	5	1	5	6	4
Eddie Bruneteau	RW	4	1	4	5	0
Ted Lindsay	LW	5	2	2	4	10
Jim Conacher	C	5	2	1	3	2
Pete Horeck	LW	5	2	0	2	6
Sid Abel	C/LW	3	1	1	2	2
Jim McFadden	C	4	0	2	2	0
Fern Gauthier	RW	3	1	0	1	0
Pat Lundy	C	5	0	1	1	2
Doug McCaig	D	5	0	1	1	4
Leo Reise Jr.	D	5	0	1	1	4
Jack Stewart	D	5	0	1	1	12
Red Almas	G	5	0	0	0	0
Gerry Couture	RW	1	0	0	0	0
Al Dewsbury	D	2	0	0	0	4
Gordie Howe	RW	5	0	0	0	18
Hugh Millar	D	1	0	0	0	0
Johnny Mowers	G	1	0	0	0	0
Bill Quackenbush	D	5	0	0	0	2
Enio Sclisizzi	LW	1	0	0	0	0
Cliff Simpson	C	1	0	0	0	0

Goaltending

Player	MIN	GP	W	L	GA	GAA	SO
Red Almas	263	5	1	3	13	2.97	0
Johnny Mowers	40	1	0	1	5	7.50	0
Team:	303	5	1	4	18	3.56	0

Note: GP = Games played; G = Goals; A = Assists; Pts = Points; +/- = Plus-minus PIM = Penalty minutes; PPG = Power-play goals; SHG = Short-handed goals; GWG = Game-winning goals;
MIN = Minutes played; W = Wins; L = Losses; T = Ties; GA = Goals against; GAA = Goals-against average; SO = Shutouts;

== Awards and records ==
- Jack Stewart, Defense, NHL Second Team All-Star
- Bill Quackenbush, Defense, NHL Second Team All-Star
