= 1946–47 NHL transactions =

The following is a list of all team-to-team transactions that have occurred in the National Hockey League (NHL) during the 1946–47 NHL season. It lists which team each player has been traded to and for which player(s) or other consideration(s), if applicable.

== Transactions ==
June, 1946 exact date unknown	To Boston Bruins Don Grosso	To Chicago Black Hawks cash
June 19, 1946	To Detroit Red Wings Hank Goldup; Ab DeMarco	To New York Rangers Flash Hollett^{1}
June 19, 1946	To Boston Bruins Babe Pratt	To New York Rangers cash rights to Eric Pogue
August, 1946 exact date unknown	To Boston Bruins Joe Carveth	To Detroit Red Wings Roy Conacher
August, 1946 exact date unknown	To Montreal Canadiens rights to Hubert Macey	To New York Rangers cash
September, 1946 exact date unknown	To Detroit Red Wings Bernie Strongman	To Chicago Black Hawks John Holota
September 17, 1946	To Boston Bruins $5,000 cash	To New York Rangers Jack Church
September 21, 1946	To Toronto Maple Leafs Gerry Brown	To Detroit Red Wings Doug Baldwin; Ray Powell
September 21, 1946	To Toronto Maple Leafs Harry Watson	To Detroit Red Wings Billy Taylor
September 21, 1946	To Toronto Maple Leafs Dutch Hiller; Vic Lynn	To Montreal Canadiens Gerry Brown; John Mahaffy
September 23, 1946	To Montreal Canadiens George Allen	To Chicago Black Hawks Paul Bibeault
November 1, 1946	To Chicago Black Hawks cash	To New York Rangers rights to Joe Cooper
December 9, 1946	To Detroit Red Wings Pete Horeck; Leo Reise Jr.	To Chicago Black Hawks Adam Brown; Ray Powell
February 15, 1947	To Boston Bruins cash	To Montreal Canadiens Bill Shill

Notes

1. Trade voided later in June 1946 when Hollett decided to retire.
