= 1946–47 Toronto Maple Leafs season =

NHL hockey team season (won Stanley Cup)

1946–47 Toronto Maple Leafs
- Stanley Cup champions
- League: 2nd NHL
- 1946–47 record: 31–19–10
- Home record: 20–8–2
- Road record: 11–11–8
- Goals for: 209
- Goals against: 172

Team information
- General manager: Conn Smythe
- Coach: Hap Day
- Captain: Syl Apps
- Arena: Maple Leaf Gardens

Team leaders
- Goals: Ted Kennedy (28)
- Assists: Ted Kennedy (32)
- Points: Ted Kennedy (60)
- Penalty minutes: Gus Mortson (133)
- Wins: Turk Broda (31)
- Goals against average: Turk Broda (2.87)

The 1946–47 Toronto Maple Leafs season resulted in the team winning the Stanley Cup, after having missed the playoffs the prior year. During the season, Maple Leaf Gardens was the first arena in the NHL to have Plexiglas inserted in the end zones of the rink.

== Off-season ==
Frank Selke was involved in the wrong end of a power struggle with Conn Smythe and the club's board of directors. Selke was let go, and was immediately signed as the new general manager of the Montreal Canadiens. Frank McCool retired of his own volition due to his ulcers, while Lorne Carr, Dave Schriner, Mel Hill and Bob Davidson were asked to retire by the team. Babe Pratt was traded to Boston. The team brought in several rookies: Bill Barilko, Garth Boesch, Howie Meeker and Sid Smith.

== Regular season ==
Despite having a large number of rookies, the team won twenty of their first thirty-one games, led by the play of Meeker. Meeker set a rookie record, scoring five goals in a 10–4 win over Chicago on January 8, 1947. The team bounced back from a disappointing 1945–46 season to place second and qualify for the playoffs.

=== Final standings ===
National Hockey League
		GP	W	L	T	GF	GA	DIFF	Pts
1	Montreal Canadiens	60	34	16	10	189	138	+51	78
2	Toronto Maple Leafs	60	31	19	10	209	172	+37	72
3	Boston Bruins	60	26	23	11	190	175	+15	63
4	Detroit Red Wings	60	22	27	11	190	193	−3	55
5	New York Rangers	60	22	32	6	167	186	−19	50
6	Chicago Black Hawks	60	19	37	4	193	274	−81	42

=== Record vs. opponents ===
1946–47 NHL Records
Team	BOS	CHI	DET	MTL	NYR	TOR
Boston	—	6–5–1	6–3–3	1–9–2	7–3–2	5–5–2
Chicago	5–6–1	—	4–7–1	3–8–1	4–8	3–8–1
Detroit	3–6–3	7–4–1	—	4–6–2	6–3–3	2–8–2
Montreal	9–1–2	8–3–1	6–4–2	—	6–5–1	5–3–4
New York	3–7–2	8–4	3–6–3	5–6–1	—	4–8
Toronto	5–5–2	8–3–1	8–2–2	3–5–4	8–4	—

== Schedule and results ==
1946–47 regular season
October

Game	Result	Date	Score	Opponent	Record
1	T	October 16	3–3	@ Detroit Red Wings (1946–47)	0–0–1
2	W	October 19	6–3	Detroit Red Wings (1946–47)	1–0–1
3	T	October 23	3–3	@ Boston Bruins (1946–47)	1–0–2
4	W	October 26	2–1	Chicago Black Hawks (1946–47)	2–0–2
5	W	October 30	5–2	@ Chicago Black Hawks (1946–47)	3–0–2

November

Game	Result	Date	Score	Opponent	Record
6	T	November 1	1–1	@ Montreal Canadiens (1946–47)	3–0–3
7	L	November 2	0–5	Boston Bruins (1946–47)	3–1–3
8	W	November 9	4–2	New York Rangers (1946–47)	4–1–3
9	W	November 10	4–2	@ Chicago Black Hawks (1946–47)	5–1–3
10	W	November 16	3–0	Montreal Canadiens (1946–47)	6–1–3
11	W	November 17	5–4	@ New York Rangers (1946–47)	7–1–3
12	L	November 20	1–4	@ Boston Bruins (1946–47)	7–2–3
13	L	November 23	2–4	Detroit Red Wings (1946–47)	7–3–3
14	W	November 24	5–0	@ Detroit Red Wings (1946–47)	8–3–3
15	L	November 27	2–5	@ Chicago Black Hawks (1946–47)	8–4–3
16	W	November 30	11–0	Chicago Black Hawks (1946–47)	9–4–3

December

Game	Result	Date	Score	Opponent	Record
17	T	December 4	2–2	@ Boston Bruins (1946–47)	9–4–4
18	W	December 7	5–1	Boston Bruins (1946–47)	10–4–4
19	W	December 8	5–4	@ Detroit Red Wings (1946–47)	11–4–4
20	L	December 11	2–3	Montreal Canadiens (1946–47)	11–5–4
21	W	December 14	3–2	New York Rangers (1946–47)	12–5–4
22	W	December 15	4–3	@ Chicago Black Hawks (1946–47)	13–5–4
23	W	December 19	3–1	Detroit Red Wings (1946–47)	14–5–4
24	W	December 21	3–1	Chicago Black Hawks (1946–47)	15–5–4
25	W	December 22	3–1	@ New York Rangers (1946–47)	16–5–4
26	W	December 25	2–1	@ Detroit Red Wings (1946–47)	17–5–4
27	L	December 26	1–4	@ Montreal Canadiens (1946–47)	17–6–4
28	W	December 28	4–3	Boston Bruins (1946–47)	18–6–4

January

Game	Result	Date	Score	Opponent	Record
29	W	January 1	2–1	Detroit Red Wings (1946–47)	19–6–4
30	W	January 2	5–4	@ New York Rangers (1946–47)	20–6–4
31	L	January 4	0–2	New York Rangers (1946–47)	20–7–4
32	W	January 8	10–4	Chicago Black Hawks (1946–47)	21–7–4
33	W	January 11	4–3	Boston Bruins (1946–47)	22–7–4
34	L	January 12	2–3	@ New York Rangers (1946–47)	22–8–4
35	W	January 15	2–1	Montreal Canadiens (1946–47)	23–8–4
36	T	January 16	1–1	@ Montreal Canadiens (1946–47)	23–8–5
37	W	January 18	7–4	Detroit Red Wings (1946–47)	24–8–5
38	L	January 19	2–3	@ Boston Bruins (1946–47)	24–9–5
39	L	January 25	0–1	New York Rangers (1946–47)	24–10–5
40	T	January 26	6–6	@ Chicago Black Hawks (1946–47)	24–10–6
41	L	January 30	0–2	@ Montreal Canadiens (1946–47)	24–11–6

February

Game	Result	Date	Score	Opponent	Record
42	L	February 1	4–5	Chicago Black Hawks (1946–47)	24–12–6
43	L	February 6	2–8	@ Montreal Canadiens (1946–47)	24–13–6
44	W	February 8	5–2	Boston Bruins (1946–47)	25–13–6
45	T	February 15	4–4	Montreal Canadiens (1946–47)	25–13–7
46	L	February 16	2–6	@ New York Rangers (1946–47)	25–14–7
47	L	February 19	3–5	@ Chicago Black Hawks (1946–47)	25–15–7
48	W	February 22	2–0	New York Rangers (1946–47)	26–15–7
49	T	February 23	2–2	@ Montreal Canadiens (1946–47)	26–15–8
50	L	February 26	0–1	Montreal Canadiens (1946–47)	26–16–8
51	T	February 27	3–3	@ Detroit Red Wings (1946–47)	26–16–9

March

Game	Result	Date	Score	Opponent	Record
52	L	March 1	4–5	Detroit Red Wings (1946–47)	26–17–9
53	L	March 5	4–5	@ Boston Bruins (1946–47)	26–18–9
54	W	March 8	12–4	Chicago Black Hawks (1946–47)	27–18–9
55	W	March 9	4–2	@ New York Rangers (1946–47)	28–18–9
56	T	March 15	5–5	Boston Bruins (1946–47)	28–18–10
57	L	March 16	3–5	@ Boston Bruins (1946–47)	28–19–10
58	W	March 19	5–4	Montreal Canadiens (1946–47)	29–19–10
59	W	March 22	5–3	New York Rangers (1946–47)	30–19–10
60	W	March 23	5–3	@ Detroit Red Wings (1946–47)	31–19–10

Legend: Win (2 points) Loss (0 points) Tie (1 point)

== Playoffs ==
=== Stanley Cup Finals ===
Montreal Canadiens vs. Toronto Maple Leafs

Date	Away	Score	Home	Score	Notes
April 8	Toronto	0	Montreal	6	
April 10	Toronto	4	Montreal	0	
April 12	Montreal	2	Toronto	4	
April 15	Montreal	1	Toronto	2	OT
April 17	Toronto	1	Montreal	3	
April 19	Montreal	1	Toronto	2	

Toronto wins best-of-seven series 4–2.

== Player statistics ==
=== Regular season ===
Scoring

Player	GP	G	A	Pts	PIM
Ted Kennedy	60	28	32	60	27
Syl Apps	54	25	24	49	6
Howie Meeker	55	27	18	45	76
Bill Ezinicki	60	17	20	37	93
Bud Poile	59	19	17	36	19
Harry Watson	44	19	15	34	10
Gaye Stewart	60	19	14	33	15
Joe Klukay	55	9	20	29	12
Nick Metz	60	12	16	28	15
Vic Lynn	31	6	14	20	44
Wally Stanowski	51	3	16	19	12
Gus Mortson	60	5	13	18	133
Jimmy Thomson	60	2	14	16	97
Don Metz	40	4	9	13	10
Gus Bodnar	39	4	6	10	10
Bill Barilko	18	3	7	10	33
Garth Boesch	35	4	5	9	47
Sid Smith	14	2	1	3	0
Bob Goldham	11	1	1	2	10
Harry Taylor	9	0	2	2	0
Turk Broda	60	0	0	0	0
Bob Dawes	1	0	0	0	0

Goaltending

Player	MIN	GP	W	L	T	GA	GAA	SA	SV	SV%	SO
Turk Broda	3600	60	31	19	10	172	2.87				4
Team:	3600	60	31	19	10	172	2.87				4

=== Playoffs ===
Scoring

Player	GP	G	A	Pts	PIM
Ted Kennedy	11	4	5	9	4
Gaye Stewart	11	2	5	7	8
Syl Apps	11	5	1	6	0
Nick Metz	6	4	2	6	0
Howie Meeker	11	3	3	6	6
Vic Lynn	11	4	1	5	16
Harry Watson	11	3	2	5	6
Don Metz	11	2	3	5	4
Gus Mortson	11	1	3	4	22
Bill Barilko	11	0	3	3	18
Bud Poile	7	2	0	2	2
Garth Boesch	11	0	2	2	6
Bill Ezinicki	11	0	2	2	30
Joe Klukay	11	1	0	1	0
Jimmy Thomson	11	0	1	1	22
Gus Bodnar	1	0	0	0	0
Turk Broda	11	0	0	0	0
Wally Stanowski	8	0	0	0	0

Goaltending

Player	MIN	GP	W	L	T	GA	GAA	SA	SV	SV%	SO
Turk Broda	680	11	8	3		27	2.38				1
Team:	680	11	8	3		27	2.38				1

== Transactions ==
- April 13, 1946: Signed Free Agent Howie Meeker
- April 30, 1946: Signed Free Agent Tod Sloan
- May 1, 1946: Signed Free Agent Harry Taylor
- June 1, 1946: Claimed Ray Powell from the Fort Worth Rangers of the USHL in inter-league draft
- September 21, 1946: Acquired Gerry Brown from the Detroit Red Wings for Doug Baldwin and Ray Powell
- September 21, 1946: Acquired Dutch Hiller and Vic Lynn from the Montreal Canadiens for Gerry Brown and John Mahaffy
- December 8, 1946: Signed Free Agent Sid Smith
- December 31, 1946: Traded Ross Johnstone to the Springfield Indians of the AHL for cash

== See also ==
- 1946–47 NHL season
