= 1947 Stanley Cup Final =

1947 ice hockey championship series

	1	2	3	4	5	6	Total
Toronto Maple Leafs	0	4	4	2*	1	2	4
Montreal Canadiens	6	0	2	1*	3	1	2
- * – Denotes overtime period(s)
- Location(s): Montreal: Montreal Forum (1, 2, 5); Toronto: Maple Leaf Gardens (3, 4, 6)
- Coaches: Toronto: Hap Day; Montreal: Dick Irvin
- Captains: Toronto: Syl Apps; Montreal: Toe Blake
- Dates: April 8–19, 1947
- Series-winning goal: Ted Kennedy (14:39, third)
- Hall of Famers: Maple Leafs: Syl Apps (1961); Turk Broda (1967); Ted Kennedy (1966); Bud Poile (1990, builder); Harry Watson (1994); Canadiens: Toe Blake (1966); Emile Bouchard (1966); Bill Durnan (1964); Elmer Lach (1966; did not play); Buddy O'Connor (1988); Ken Reardon (1966); Maurice Richard (1961); Coaches: Hap Day (1961, player); Dick Irvin (1958, player)

The 1947 Stanley Cup Final was a best-of-seven series between the Toronto Maple Leafs and the defending champion Montreal Canadiens. This was the first Finals meeting in the history of the Canadiens–Maple Leafs rivalry. The Maple Leafs defeated the Canadiens four games to two. This was the first all-Canadian Finals since 1935, when the since-folded Montreal Maroons defeated the Maple Leafs.

== Paths to the Finals ==
Montreal defeated the Boston Bruins 4–1 to advance to the Finals. Toronto defeated the Detroit Red Wings 4–1 to advance to the Finals.

The Montreal Canadiens finished first in the league with 78 points. The Toronto Maple Leafs finished second with 72 points. This was the fifth playoff series between these two teams with each team winning two of the previous series. Their most recent series came in the 1945 semifinals which Toronto won in six games. In the regular season series, there were five wins for Montreal, three wins for Toronto and four ties.

== Game summaries ==
Ted Kennedy was the leader with three goals including the Cup winner. Toronto had several new players in its lineup, including Howie Meeker, Bill Barilko and Bill Ezinicki, as Toronto sported the youngest NHL team to win the Cup to that time.

The series continued a competition that had gone on all season, with Montreal and Toronto finishing 1–2. Montreal coach Dick Irvin was mad at the beginning of the series, recalling a season-ending injury to Montreal forward Elmer Lach from a body check by Don Metz. Montreal started out strong in the series, defeating the Leafs 6–0 in the opener. Canadiens goaltender Bill Durnan reportedly asked "How did those guys get in the league?", although he denied saying those words later.

The second game was a rough game, with Maurice Richard knocking out Vic Lynn and Bill Ezinicki with high-sticks to the head. Richard earned himself over 20 minutes in penalties and a game misconduct and a suspension for game three. The Leafs took advantage of the power plays and defeated Montreal 4–0. Richard would earn himself a further $250 fine imposed by president Clarence Campbell.

Games three and four were played in Toronto, and Toronto won both to take a 3–1 series lead. Returning to the Forum for game five, Montreal won the game to extend the series. In the sixth game, Turk Broda showed outstanding goaltending, holding off Ken Reardon on a late breakaway, and the Leafs won 2–1 to win the Stanley Cup.

After the sixth game ended, the Cup was not presented to the Leafs. Clarence Campbell declined to present the Cup immediately, concerned over the spectre of fan violence.

April 8	Toronto Maple Leafs	0–6	Montreal Canadiens	Montreal Forum	Recap
No scoring		First period	2:20 - pp - Buddy O'Connor (1)
No scoring		Second period	8:17 - pp - Billy Reay (5); 9:41 - Maurice Richard (4)
No scoring		Third period	5:40 - George Allen (1); 11:04 - Billy Reay (6); 18:28 - Murph Chamberlain (1)
Turk Broda		Goalie stats	Bill Durnan

April 10	Toronto Maple Leafs	4–0	Montreal Canadiens	Montreal Forum	Recap
Ted Kennedy (2) - pp - 1:12; Vic Lynn (2) - pp - 1:36		First period	No scoring
Gaye Stewart (2) - pp - 6:37		Second period	No scoring
Harry Watson (2) - pp - 11:55		Third period	No scoring
Turk Broda		Goalie stats	Bill Durnan

April 12	Montreal Canadiens	2–4	Toronto Maple Leafs	Maple Leaf Gardens	Recap
No scoring		First period	9:45 - Gus Mortson (1)
Leo Gravelle (1) - 12:33; Buddy O'Connor (2) - 18:30		Second period	4:48 - pp - Bud Poile (1); 12:23 - Vic Lynn (3)
No scoring		Third period	19:13 - Ted Kennedy (3)
Bill Durnan		Goalie stats	Turk Broda

April 15	Montreal Canadiens	1–2	OT	Toronto Maple Leafs	Maple Leaf Gardens	Recap
Glen Harmon (1) - pp - 4:38		First period		6:13 - Harry Watson (3)
No scoring		Second period		No scoring
No scoring		Third period		No scoring
No scoring		First overtime period		16:36 - Syl Apps (5)
Bill Durnan		Goalie stats		Turk Broda

April 17	Toronto Maple Leafs	1–3	Montreal Canadiens	Montreal Forum	Recap
No scoring		First period	1:23 - Maurice Richard (5); 8:29 - Leo Gravelle (2)
No scoring		Second period	19:32 - pp - Maurice Richard (6)
Bud Poile (2) - 13:37		Third period	No scoring
Turk Broda		Goalie stats	Bill Durnan

April 19	Montreal Canadiens	1–2	Toronto Maple Leafs	Maple Leaf Gardens	Recap
Buddy O'Connor (3) - 00:25		First period	No scoring
No scoring		Second period	5:39 - Vic Lynn (4)
No scoring		Third period	14:39 - Ted Kennedy (4)
Bill Durnan		Goalie stats	Turk Broda

Toronto won series 4–2

== Stanley Cup engraving ==
The 1947 Stanley Cup was presented to Maple Leafs captain Syl Apps by NHL President Clarence Campbell following the Maple Leafs 2–1 win over the Canadiens in game six.

The following Maple Leafs players and staff had their names engraved on the Stanley Cup

1946–47 Toronto Maple Leafs

=== Players ===
Centres

- 8 Gus Bodnar
- 9 Ted Teeder Kennedy (A)
- 10 Sylvanous Syl Apps Sr. (Captain)

Wingers

- 4 Harry Watson
- 5 Nick Metz
- 7 Norman Bud Poile
- 11 Don Metz
- 12 Bill Ezinicki
- 14 Vic Lynn
- 15 Howie Meeker
- 16 Gaye Stewart (A)
- 17 Joe Klukay*

Defencemen

- 2 Bob Goldham
- 3 Wally Stanowski
- 18 Garth Boesch
- 19 Gus Mortson
- 20 Jimmy Thomson
- 21 Bill Barilko

Goaltenders

- 1 Walter Turk Broda

* Name mistakenly removed from the Stanley Cup when it was redone in the 1957–58 season.

=== Coaching and administrative staff ===
- Ed Bickle (President/Owner), William MacBrien (Vice President/Owner)
- Jack Bickell (Director/Owner), John Murdoch (Vice President)
- Conn Smythe (Manager/Owner), Clarence Hap Day (Coach)
- Tim Daly (Trainer), Clifford Keyland (Asst. Trainer)
- Robert Galloway (Team Doctor), Horance MacIntyre (Team Doctor)
- George Walker (Chief Scout)

=== Stanley Cup engraving ===
- 17 Joe Klukay's (LW) name was removed by mistake from the new version of 1947 Toronto's engraving created in 1957–58. (There is space where his name should have been included, left of Don Metz)
- 2 Bob Goldham - only played 11 games due to an injury, but names was included on the Stanley Cup.
- 1947 Toronto Maple Leafs were the first Stanley Cup-winning team to have the Captain(C) and Assistant Captain(A) marked on their sweaters on their Stanley Cup team picture.
- When the Replica Cup was created in 1992–93, a new mistake happened. Robert J. Galloway's name was misspelled as P.J. Galloway with "P" instead of an "R". His name is spelled correctly the first 2 times 1947 Toronto members were engraved.
- The Stanley Cup was full, and 1946-47 Toronto Maple Leafs members' names were not engraved on the Stanley Cup until 1948.

== See also ==
- 1946–47 NHL season

== References and notes ==
- NHL (2000). Diamond, Dan (ed.). Total Stanley Cup. Dan Diamond & Associates.
- McFarlane, Brian (1996). The Leafs. Stoddart Publishing. ISBN 0-7737-5843-7.
- Podnieks, Andrew; Hockey Hall of Fame (2004). Lord Stanley's Cup. Triumph Books. ISBN 1-55168-261-3.
- "All-Time NHL Results". Archived from the original on July 24, 2017.

Preceded by Montreal Canadiens; 1946	Toronto Maple Leafs; Stanley Cup champions 1947	Succeeded by Toronto Maple Leafs; 1948
