= 1946–47 Montreal Canadiens season =

NHL hockey team season

1946–47 Montreal Canadiens
- Prince of Wales Trophy winners
- League: 1st NHL
- 1946–47 record: 34–16–10
- Home record: 19–6–5
- Road record: 15–10–5
- Goals for: 189
- Goals against: 138

Team information
- General manager: Frank J. Selke
- Coach: Dick Irvin
- Captain: Toe Blake
- Arena: Montreal Forum

Team leaders
- Goals: Maurice Richard (45)
- Assists: Toe Blake (29)
- Points: Maurice Richard (71)
- Penalty minutes: Murph Chamberlain (97)
- Wins: Bill Durnan (34)
- Goals against average: Bill Durnan (2.30)

The 1946–47 Montreal Canadiens season was the 38th season in club history. The team placed first in the regular season to qualify for the playoffs. The Canadiens lost in the Stanley Cup finals against the Toronto Maple Leafs four games to two.

== Regular season ==
=== Final standings ===
National Hockey League
		GP	W	L	T	GF	GA	DIFF	Pts
1	Montreal Canadiens	60	34	16	10	189	138	+51	78
2	Toronto Maple Leafs	60	31	19	10	209	172	+37	72
3	Boston Bruins	60	26	23	11	190	175	+15	63
4	Detroit Red Wings	60	22	27	11	190	193	−3	55
5	New York Rangers	60	22	32	6	167	186	−19	50
6	Chicago Black Hawks	60	19	37	4	193	274	−81	42

=== Record vs. opponents ===
1946–47 NHL Records
Team	BOS	CHI	DET	MTL	NYR	TOR
Boston	—	6–5–1	6–3–3	1–9–2	7–3–2	5–5–2
Chicago	5–6–1	—	4–7–1	3–8–1	4–8	3–8–1
Detroit	3–6–3	7–4–1	—	4–6–2	6–3–3	2–8–2
Montreal	9–1–2	8–3–1	6–4–2	—	6–5–1	5–3–4
New York	3–7–2	8–4	3–6–3	5–6–1	—	4–8
Toronto	5–5–2	8–3–1	8–2–2	3–5–4	8–4	—

== Schedule and results ==
1946–47 regular season
October

Game	Result	Date	Score	Opponent	Record
1	W	October 17, 1946	3–0	New York Rangers (1946–47)	1–0–0
2	T	October 19, 1946	1–1	Boston Bruins (1946–47)	1–0–1
3	L	October 23, 1946	1–4	New York Rangers (1946–47)	1–1–1
4	W	October 26, 1946	7–2	Detroit Red Wings (1946–47)	2–1–1
5	L	October 27, 1946	1–2	@ Detroit Red Wings (1946–47)	2–2–1

November

Game	Result	Date	Score	Opponent	Record
6	T	November 1, 1946	1–1	Toronto Maple Leafs (1946–47)	2–2–2
7	W	November 7, 1946	4–3	Chicago Black Hawks (1946–47)	3–2–2
8	W	November 9, 1946	5–2	Boston Bruins (1946–47)	4–2–2
9	L	November 10, 1946	3–6	@ Detroit Red Wings (1946–47)	4–3–2
10	T	November 13, 1946	4–4	@ New York Rangers (1946–47)	4–3–3
11	W	November 14, 1946	4–3	Detroit Red Wings (1946–47)	5–3–3
12	L	November 16, 1946	0–3	@ Toronto Maple Leafs (1946–47)	5–4–3
13	W	November 17, 1946	4–1	@ Boston Bruins (1946–47)	6–4–3
14	L	November 23, 1946	2–3	New York Rangers (1946–47)	6–5–3
15	W	November 24, 1946	4–2	@ Boston Bruins (1946–47)	7–5–3
16	W	November 27, 1946	6–1	@ Detroit Red Wings (1946–47)	8–5–3
17	W	November 30, 1946	4–1	Detroit Red Wings (1946–47)	9–5–3

December

Game	Result	Date	Score	Opponent	Record
18	W	December 3, 1946	4–1	Chicago Black Hawks (1946–47)	10–5–3
19	L	December 4, 1946	1–2	@ New York Rangers (1946–47)	10–6–3
20	W	December 8, 1946	5–3	@ Chicago Black Hawks (1946–47)	11–6–3
21	W	December 11, 1946	3–2	@ Toronto Maple Leafs (1946–47)	12–6–3
22	W	December 15, 1946	5–3	@ New York Rangers (1946–47)	13–6–3
23	W	December 21, 1946	5–1	Boston Bruins (1946–47)	14–6–3
24	W	December 22, 1946	4–2	@ Detroit Red Wings (1946–47)	15–6–3
25	L	December 25, 1946	0–2	@ New York Rangers (1946–47)	15–7–3
26	W	December 26, 1946	4–1	Toronto Maple Leafs (1946–47)	16–7–3
27	W	December 28, 1946	8–2	Chicago Black Hawks (1946–47)	17–7–3

January

Game	Result	Date	Score	Opponent	Record
28	W	January 1, 1947	5–2	@ Chicago Black Hawks (1946–47)	18–7–3
29	W	January 4, 1947	4–1	Boston Bruins (1946–47)	19–7–3
30	L	January 8, 1947	2–4	Detroit Red Wings (1946–47)	19–8–3
31	L	January 11, 1947	1–2	Chicago Black Hawks (1946–47)	19–9–3
32	L	January 12, 1947	1–3	@ Chicago Black Hawks (1946–47)	19–10–3
33	L	January 15, 1947	1–2	@ Toronto Maple Leafs (1946–47)	19–11–3
34	T	January 16, 1947	1–1	Toronto Maple Leafs (1946–47)	19–11–4
35	W	January 18, 1947	6–2	New York Rangers (1946–47)	20–11–4
36	T	January 19, 1947	2–2	@ Detroit Red Wings (1946–47)	20–11–5
37	W	January 22, 1947	4–3	@ Boston Bruins (1946–47)	21–11–5
38	W	January 25, 1947	4–1	Boston Bruins (1946–47)	22–11–5
39	W	January 28, 1947	4–2	@ Chicago Black Hawks (1946–47)	23–11–5
40	W	January 30, 1947	2–0	Toronto Maple Leafs (1946–47)	24–11–5

February

Game	Result	Date	Score	Opponent	Record
41	W	February 1, 1947	2–1	New York Rangers (1946–47)	25–11–5
42	L	February 2, 1947	1–7	@ New York Rangers (1946–47)	25–12–5
43	W	February 5, 1947	3–2	@ Boston Bruins (1946–47)	26–12–5
44	W	February 6, 1947	8–2	Toronto Maple Leafs (1946–47)	27–12–5
45	W	February 8, 1947	4–3	Detroit Red Wings (1946–47)	28–12–5
46	T	February 12, 1947	1–1	@ Chicago Black Hawks (1946–47)	28–12–6
47	T	February 15, 1947	4–4	@ Toronto Maple Leafs (1946–47)	28–12–7
48	T	February 16, 1947	2–2	@ Boston Bruins (1946–47)	28–12–8
49	L	February 22, 1947	3–7	@ Detroit Red Wings (1946–47)	28–13–8
50	T	February 23, 1947	2–2	Toronto Maple Leafs (1946–47)	28–13–9
51	W	February 26, 1947	1–0	@ Toronto Maple Leafs (1946–47)	29–13–9
52	W	February 27, 1947	6–5	Chicago Black Hawks (1946–47)	30–13–9

March

Game	Result	Date	Score	Opponent	Record
53	L	March 1, 1947	1–2	Boston Bruins (1946–47)	30–14–9
54	T	March 6, 1947	1–1	Detroit Red Wings (1946–47)	30–14–10
55	W	March 9, 1947	4–1	@ Chicago Black Hawks (1946–47)	31–14–10
56	W	March 15, 1947	1–0	New York Rangers (1946–47)	32–14–10
57	W	March 16, 1947	4–3	@ New York Rangers (1946–47)	33–14–10
58	L	March 19, 1947	4–5	@ Toronto Maple Leafs (1946–47)	33–15–10
59	L	March 22, 1947	4–5	Chicago Black Hawks (1946–47)	33–16–10
60	W	March 23, 1947	3–2	@ Boston Bruins (1946–47)	34–16–10

Legend: Win (2 points) Loss (0 points) Tie (1 point)

== Player statistics ==
=== Regular season ===
==== Scoring ====
Player	Pos	GP	G	A	Pts	PIM
Maurice Richard	RW	60	45	26	71	69
Toe Blake	LW	60	21	29	50	6
Billy Reay	C	59	22	20	42	17
Leo Gravelle	RW	53	16	14	30	12
Elmer Lach	C	31	14	16	30	22
Buddy O'Connor	C	46	10	20	30	6
Jimmy Peters	RW	60	11	13	24	27
Ken Reardon	D	52	5	17	22	84
Roger Leger	D	49	4	18	22	12
George Allen	LW/D	49	7	14	21	12
Murph Chamberlain	LW	49	10	10	20	97
Ken Mosdell	C	54	5	10	15	50
Glen Harmon	D	57	5	9	14	53
Leo Lamoureux	C/D	50	2	11	13	14
Emile Bouchard	D	60	5	7	12	60
Bob Fillion	LW	57	6	3	9	16
John Quilty	C	3	1	1	2	0
Hub Macey	LW	12	0	1	1	0
Joe Benoit	RW	6	0	0	0	4
Bill Durnan	G	60	0	0	0	0
Frank Eddolls	D	6	0	0	0	0
Doug Lewis	LW	3	0	0	0	0
George Pargeter	LW	4	0	0	0	0

==== Goaltending ====
Player	MIN	GP	W	L	T	GA	GAA	SO
Bill Durnan	3600	60	34	16	10	138	2.30	4
Team:	3600	60	34	16	10	138	2.30	4

=== Playoffs ===
==== Scoring ====
Player	Pos	GP	G	A	Pts	PIM
Maurice Richard	RW	10	6	5	11	44
Toe Blake	LW	11	2	7	9	0
Billy Reay	C	11	6	1	7	14
Buddy O'Connor	C	8	3	4	7	0
Roger Leger	D	11	0	6	6	10
John Quilty	C	7	3	2	5	9
George Allen	LW/D	11	1	3	4	6
Murph Chamberlain	LW	11	1	3	4	19
Jimmy Peters	RW	11	1	2	3	10
Ken Reardon	D	7	1	2	3	20
Emile Bouchard	D	11	0	3	3	21
Leo Gravelle	RW	6	2	0	2	2
Ken Mosdell	C	4	2	0	2	4
Glen Harmon	D	11	1	1	2	4
Murdo MacKay	RW/C	9	0	1	1	0
Bill Durnan	G	11	0	0	0	0
Frank Eddolls	D	7	0	0	0	4
Bob Fillion	LW	8	0	0	0	0
Leo Lamoureux	C/D	4	0	0	0	4
Hub Macey	LW	7	0	0	0	0

==== Goaltending ====
Player	MIN	GP	W	L	GA	GAA	SO
Bill Durnan	720	11	6	5	23	1.92	1
Team:	720	11	6	5	23	1.92	1

Note:

Pos = Position;GP = Games played; G = Goals; A = Assists; Pts = Points; PIM = Penalty minutes; +/- = Plus/minus; PPG = Power-play goals; SHG = Short-handed goals; GWG = Game-winning goals
Pos = Position;GP = Games played; Min, TOI = Minutes played; W = Wins; L = Losses; T,T/OT = Ties; OTL = Overtime losses; GA = Goals-against; GAA = Goals-against average; SO = Shutouts; SA = Shots against; SV = Shots saved;SV% = Save percentage;

== Awards and records ==
- Hart Memorial Trophy : Maurice Richard
- Vezina Trophy : Bill Durnan

== See also ==
- 1946–47 NHL season
