= 1946–47 New York Rangers season =

NHL hockey team season

1946–47 New York Rangers
- League: 5th NHL
- 1946–47 record: 22–32–6
- Home record: 11–14–5
- Road record: 11–18–1
- Goals for: 167
- Goals against: 186

Team information
- Coach: Frank Boucher
- Captain: Neil Colville
- Arena: Madison Square Garden

Team leaders
- Goals: Tony Leswick (27)
- Assists: Edgar Laprade (25)
- Points: Tony Leswick (41)
- Penalty minutes: Bill Juzda (60)
- Wins: Chuck Rayner (22)
- Goals against average: Chuck Rayner (3.05)

The 1946–47 New York Rangers season was the franchise's 21st season. The Rangers compiled a 22–32–6 record in the regular season and finished with 50 points. The team's fifth-place finish caused it to miss the NHL playoffs for the fifth consecutive season for the first time in franchise history.

== Regular season ==
=== Final standings ===
National Hockey League
		GP	W	L	T	GF	GA	DIFF	Pts
1	Montreal Canadiens	60	34	16	10	189	138	+51	78
2	Toronto Maple Leafs	60	31	19	10	209	172	+37	72
3	Boston Bruins	60	26	23	11	190	175	+15	63
4	Detroit Red Wings	60	22	27	11	190	193	−3	55
5	New York Rangers	60	22	32	6	167	186	−19	50
6	Chicago Black Hawks	60	19	37	4	193	274	−81	42

=== Record vs. opponents ===
1946–47 NHL Records
Team	BOS	CHI	DET	MTL	NYR	TOR
Boston	—	6–5–1	6–3–3	1–9–2	7–3–2	5–5–2
Chicago	5–6–1	—	4–7–1	3–8–1	4–8	3–8–1
Detroit	3–6–3	7–4–1	—	4–6–2	6–3–3	2–8–2
Montreal	9–1–2	8–3–1	6–4–2	—	6–5–1	5–3–4
New York	3–7–2	8–4	3–6–3	5–6–1	—	4–8
Toronto	5–5–2	8–3–1	8–2–2	3–5–4	8–4	—

== Schedule and results ==
1946–47 regular season
October: 2–2–1 (home: 0–0–1; road: 2–2–0)

Game	October	Opponent	Score	Record
1	17	@ Montreal Canadiens	3–0	0–1–0
2	20	@ Detroit Red Wings	3–1	1–1–0
3	23	@ Montreal Canadiens	4–1	2–1–0
4	26	@ Boston Bruins	3–1	2–2–0
5	30	Boston Bruins	3–3	2–2–1

November: 3–8–1 (home: 1–3–1; road: 2–5–0)

Game	November	Opponent	Score	Record
6	2	Detroit Red Wings	7–4	3–2–1
7	3	@ Detroit Red Wings	3–1	3–3–1
8	6	@ Chicago Black Hawks	6–2	3–4–1
9	9	@ Toronto Maple Leafs	4–2	3–5–1
10	10	Boston Bruins	4–0	3–6–1
11	13	Montreal Canadiens	4–4	3–6–2
12	16	Chicago Black Hawks	6–2	3–7–2
13	17	Toronto Maple Leafs	5–4	3–8–2
14	21	@ Detroit Red Wings	3–1	3–9–2
15	23	@ Montreal Canadiens	3–2	4–9–2
16	24	@ Chicago Black Hawks	5–1	5–9–2
17	27	@ Boston Bruins	5–2	5–10–2

December: 4–5–3 (home: 2–3–2; road: 2–2–1)

Game	December	Opponent	Score	Record
18	1	@ Chicago Black Hawks	2–1	6–10–2
19	4	Montreal Canadiens	2–1	7–10–2
20	8	@ Boston Bruins	6–4	8–10–2
21	11	Detroit Red Wings	1–1	8–10–3
22	14	@ Toronto Maple Leafs	3–2	8–11–3
23	15	Montreal Canadiens	5–3	8–12–3
24	18	@ Boston Bruins	3–2	8–13–3
25	22	Toronto Maple Leafs	3–1	8–14–3
26	25	Montreal Canadiens	2–0	9–14–3
27	28	@ Detroit Red Wings	2–2	9–14–4
28	29	Boston Bruins	2–2	9–14–5
29	31	Detroit Red Wings	5–4	9–15–5

January: 7–4–0 (home: 4–2–0; road: 3–2–0)

Game	January	Opponent	Score	Record
30	1	@ Boston Bruins	3–1	9–16–5
31	2	Toronto Maple Leafs	5–4	9–17–5
32	4	@ Toronto Maple Leafs	2–0	10–17–5
33	5	Chicago Black Hawks	9–0	11–17–5
34	8	Boston Bruins	3–1	11–18–5
35	12	Toronto Maple Leafs	3–2	12–18–5
36	15	Detroit Red Wings	4–3	13–18–5
37	18	@ Montreal Canadiens	6–2	13–19–5
38	19	Chicago Black Hawks	5–3	14–19–5
39	22	@ Chicago Black Hawks	4–2	15–19–5
40	25	@ Toronto Maple Leafs	1–0	16–19–5

February: 4–5–1 (home: 3–1–1; road: 1–4–0)

Game	February	Opponent	Score	Record
41	1	@ Montreal Canadiens	2–1	16–20–5
42	2	Montreal Canadiens	7–1	17–20–5
43	5	@ Chicago Black Hawks	3–2	18–20–5
44	9	@ Detroit Red Wings	5–2	18–21–5
45	12	@ Boston Bruins	10–1	18–22–5
46	16	Toronto Maple Leafs	6–2	19–22–5
47	19	Boston Bruins	6–0	20–22–5
48	22	@ Toronto Maple Leafs	2–0	20–23–5
49	23	Detroit Red Wings	2–2	20–23–6
50	26	Chicago Black Hawks	9–7	20–24–6

March: 2–8–0 (home: 1–5–0; road: 1–3–0)

Game	March	Opponent	Score	Record
51	2	Boston Bruins	3–2	20–25–6
52	3	Chicago Black Hawks	9–4	20–26–6
53	5	@ Chicago Black Hawks	3–1	21–26–6
54	9	Toronto Maple Leafs	4–2	21–27–6
55	12	Detroit Red Wings	4–2	21–28–6
56	15	@ Montreal Canadiens	1–0	21–29–6
57	16	Montreal Canadiens	4–3	21–30–6
58	19	@ Detroit Red Wings	2–0	21–31–6
59	22	@ Toronto Maple Leafs	5–3	21–32–6
60	23	Chicago Black Hawks	4–3	22–32–6

Legend: Win (2 points) Loss (0 points) Tie (1 point)

== Player statistics ==
Skaters

Regular season
Player	GP	G	A	Pts	PIM
Tony Leswick	59	27	14	41	51
Grant Warwick	54	20	20	40	24
Edgar Laprade	58	15	25	40	9
Bryan Hextall	60	20	10	30	18
Cal Gardner	52	13	16	29	30
Church Russell	54	20	8	28	8
Rene Trudell	59	8	16	24	38
Neil Colville	60	4	16	20	16
Ab DeMarco	44	9	10	19	4
Alf Pike	31	7	11	18	2
Phil Watson	48	6	12	18	17
Bill Moe	59	4	10	14	44
Hal Laycoe	58	1	12	13	25
Joe Bell	47	6	4	10	12
Joe Cooper	59	2	8	10	38
Bill Juzda	45	3	5	8	60
Joe Levandoski	8	1	1	2	0
Jean Lamirande	14	1	1	2	14
Harry Bell	1	0	1	1	0
Jean-Paul Denis	6	0	1	1	0
Jack Lancien	1	0	0	0	0
Norm Larson	1	0	0	0	0
Sherman White	1	0	0	0	0
Melvin Read	6	0	0	0	8
Mac Colville	14	0	0	0	8

Goaltenders

Regular season
Player	GP	TOI	W	L	T	GA	GAA	SO
Chuck Rayner	58	3480	22	30	6	177	3.05	5
Jim Henry	2	120	0	2	0	9	4.50	0

^{†}Denotes player spent time with another team before joining Rangers. Stats reflect time with Rangers only.
^{‡}Traded mid-season. Stats reflect time with Rangers only.

Note:

Pos = Position;GP = Games played; G = Goals; A = Assists; Pts = Points; PIM = Penalty minutes; +/- = Plus/minus; PPG = Power-play goals; SHG = Short-handed goals; GWG = Game-winning goals
Pos = Position;GP = Games played; Min, TOI = Minutes played; W = Wins; L = Losses; T,T/OT = Ties; OTL = Overtime losses; GA = Goals-against; GAA = Goals-against average; SO = Shutouts; SA = Shots against; SV = Shots saved;SV% = Save percentage;

== See also ==
- 1946–47 NHL season
