= 1946–47 Boston Bruins season =

NHL team season

1946–47 Boston Bruins
- League: 3rd NHL
- 1946–47 record: 26–23–11
- Home record: 18–7–5
- Road record: 8–16–6
- Goals for: 190
- Goals against: 175

Team information
- General manager: Art Ross
- Coach: Dit Clapper
- Captain: Bobby Bauer
- Arena: Boston Garden

Team leaders
- Goals: Bobby Bauer (30)
- Assists: Milt Schmidt (35)
- Points: Milt Schmidt (62)
- Penalty minutes: Pat Egan (89)
- Wins: Frank Brimsek (26)
- Goals against average: Frank Brimsek (2.92)

The 1946–47 Boston Bruins season was the Bruins' 23rd season in the NHL.

== Regular season ==
On February 12, 1947, Dit Clapper played his final game with the Boston Bruins. Before the start of the game, Clapper was inducted into the Hockey Hall of Fame. He was the only active player to be inducted into the Hall.

=== Final standings ===
National Hockey League
		GP	W	L	T	GF	GA	DIFF	Pts
1	Montreal Canadiens	60	34	16	10	189	138	+51	78
2	Toronto Maple Leafs	60	31	19	10	209	172	+37	72
3	Boston Bruins	60	26	23	11	190	175	+15	63
4	Detroit Red Wings	60	22	27	11	190	193	−3	55
5	New York Rangers	60	22	32	6	167	186	−19	50
6	Chicago Black Hawks	60	19	37	4	193	274	−81	42

=== Record vs. opponents ===
1946–47 NHL Records
Team	BOS	CHI	DET	MTL	NYR	TOR
Boston	—	6–5–1	6–3–3	1–9–2	7–3–2	5–5–2
Chicago	5–6–1	—	4–7–1	3–8–1	4–8	3–8–1
Detroit	3–6–3	7–4–1	—	4–6–2	6–3–3	2–8–2
Montreal	9–1–2	8–3–1	6–4–2	—	6–5–1	5–3–4
New York	3–7–2	8–4	3–6–3	5–6–1	—	4–8
Toronto	5–5–2	8–3–1	8–2–2	3–5–4	8–4	—

== Schedule and results ==
1946–47 regular season
October

Game	Result	Date	Score	Opponent	Record
1	T	October 19, 1946	1–1	@ Montreal Canadiens (1946–47)	0–0–1
2	T	October 20, 1946	2–2	Chicago Black Hawks (1946–47)	0–0–2
3	T	October 23, 1946	3–3	Toronto Maple Leafs (1946–47)	0–0–3
4	W	October 26, 1946	3–1	New York Rangers (1946–47)	1–0–3
5	T	October 30, 1946	3–3	@ New York Rangers (1946–47)	1–0–4

November

Game	Result	Date	Score	Opponent	Record
6	W	November 2, 1946	5–0	@ Toronto Maple Leafs (1946–47)	2–0–4
7	L	November 3, 1946	3–5	@ Chicago Black Hawks (1946–47)	2–1–4
8	T	November 6, 1946	3–3	@ Detroit Red Wings (1946–47)	2–1–5
9	L	November 9, 1946	2–5	@ Montreal Canadiens (1946–47)	2–2–5
10	W	November 10, 1946	4–0	@ New York Rangers (1946–47)	3–2–5
11	W	November 13, 1946	5–2	Detroit Red Wings (1946–47)	4–2–5
12	L	November 17, 1946	1–4	Montreal Canadiens (1946–47)	4–3–5
13	W	November 20, 1946	4–1	Toronto Maple Leafs (1946–47)	5–3–5
14	L	November 24, 1946	2–4	Montreal Canadiens (1946–47)	5–4–5
15	W	November 27, 1946	5–2	New York Rangers (1946–47)	6–4–5

December

Game	Result	Date	Score	Opponent	Record
16	T	December 1, 1946	3–3	Detroit Red Wings (1946–47)	6–4–6
17	T	December 4, 1946	2–2	Toronto Maple Leafs (1946–47)	6–4–7
18	L	December 7, 1946	1–5	@ Toronto Maple Leafs (1946–47)	6–5–7
19	L	December 8, 1946	4–6	New York Rangers (1946–47)	6–6–7
20	W	December 11, 1946	4–1	Chicago Black Hawks (1946–47)	7–6–7
21	W	December 15, 1946	3–2	Detroit Red Wings (1946–47)	8–6–7
22	W	December 18, 1946	3–2	New York Rangers (1946–47)	9–6–7
23	L	December 21, 1946	1–5	@ Montreal Canadiens (1946–47)	9–7–7
24	L	December 22, 1946	1–5	@ Chicago Black Hawks (1946–47)	9–8–7
25	L	December 25, 1946	3–5	Chicago Black Hawks (1946–47)	9–9–7
26	L	December 28, 1946	3–4	@ Toronto Maple Leafs (1946–47)	9–10–7
27	T	December 29, 1946	2–2	@ New York Rangers (1946–47)	9–10–8

January

Game	Result	Date	Score	Opponent	Record
28	W	January 1, 1947	3–1	New York Rangers (1946–47)	10–10–8
29	L	January 4, 1947	1–4	@ Montreal Canadiens (1946–47)	10–11–8
30	L	January 5, 1947	1–3	@ Detroit Red Wings (1946–47)	10–12–8
31	W	January 8, 1947	3–1	@ New York Rangers (1946–47)	11–12–8
32	L	January 11, 1947	3–4	@ Toronto Maple Leafs (1946–47)	11–13–8
33	L	January 12, 1947	1–5	@ Detroit Red Wings (1946–47)	11–14–8
34	W	January 15, 1947	6–3	Chicago Black Hawks (1946–47)	12–14–8
35	W	January 18, 1947	3–1	Chicago Black Hawks (1946–47)	13–14–8
36	W	January 19, 1947	3–2	Toronto Maple Leafs (1946–47)	14–14–8
37	L	January 22, 1947	3–4	Montreal Canadiens (1946–47)	14–15–8
38	L	January 25, 1947	1–4	@ Montreal Canadiens (1946–47)	14–16–8
39	W	January 26, 1947	4–3	Detroit Red Wings (1946–47)	15–16–8
40	W	January 29, 1947	4–1	Detroit Red Wings (1946–47)	16–16–8

February

Game	Result	Date	Score	Opponent	Record
41	T	February 1, 1947	2–2	@ Detroit Red Wings (1946–47)	16–16–9
42	L	February 2, 1947	1–3	@ Chicago Black Hawks (1946–47)	16–17–9
43	L	February 5, 1947	2–3	Montreal Canadiens (1946–47)	16–18–9
44	L	February 8, 1947	2–5	@ Toronto Maple Leafs (1946–47)	16–19–9
45	L	February 9, 1947	4–6	@ Chicago Black Hawks (1946–47)	16–20–9
46	W	February 12, 1947	10–1	New York Rangers (1946–47)	17–20–9
47	T	February 16, 1947	2–2	Montreal Canadiens (1946–47)	17–20–10
48	L	February 19, 1947	0–6	@ New York Rangers (1946–47)	17–21–10
49	L	February 20, 1947	0–3	@ Detroit Red Wings (1946–47)	17–22–10
50	W	February 23, 1947	9–4	@ Chicago Black Hawks (1946–47)	18–22–10

March

Game	Result	Date	Score	Opponent	Record
51	W	March 1, 1947	2–1	@ Montreal Canadiens (1946–47)	19–22–10
52	W	March 2, 1947	3–2	@ New York Rangers (1946–47)	20–22–10
53	W	March 5, 1947	5–4	Toronto Maple Leafs (1946–47)	21–22–10
54	W	March 9, 1947	6–0	Detroit Red Wings (1946–47)	22–22–10
55	W	March 12, 1947	8–3	@ Chicago Black Hawks (1946–47)	23–22–10
56	W	March 13, 1947	3–2	@ Detroit Red Wings (1946–47)	24–22–10
57	T	March 15, 1947	5–5	@ Toronto Maple Leafs (1946–47)	24–22–11
58	W	March 16, 1947	5–3	Toronto Maple Leafs (1946–47)	25–22–11
59	W	March 19, 1947	7–3	Chicago Black Hawks (1946–47)	26–22–11
60	L	March 23, 1947	2–3	Montreal Canadiens (1946–47)	26–23–11

Legend: Win (2 points) Loss (0 points) Tie (1 point)

== Player statistics ==
=== Regular season ===
Scoring

Player	Pos	GP	G	A	Pts	PIM
Milt Schmidt	C/D	59	27	35	62	40
Bobby Bauer	RW	58	30	24	54	4
Woody Dumart	LW	60	24	28	52	12
Bill Cowley	C	51	13	25	38	16
Joe Carveth	RW	51	21	15	36	18
Don Gallinger	C	47	11	19	30	12
Pat Egan	D	60	7	18	25	89
Bep Guidolin	LW	56	10	13	23	73
Ken Smith	LW	60	14	7	21	4
Terry Reardon	C/RW	60	6	14	20	17
Jack Crawford	D	58	1	17	18	16
Murray Henderson	D	57	5	12	17	63
Jack McGill	C	24	5	9	14	19
Mark Marquess	RW	27	5	4	9	6
Babe Pratt	D	31	4	4	8	25
Fern Flaman	D	23	1	4	5	41
Ed Barry	LW	19	1	3	4	2
Clare Martin	D	6	3	0	3	0
Bill Shill	RW	27	2	0	2	2
Don Grosso	LW/C	33	0	2	2	2
Norm McAtee	C	13	0	1	1	0
Frank Brimsek	G	60	0	0	0	2
Dit Clapper	RW/D	6	0	0	0	0
Johnny Peirson	RW	5	0	0	0	0

Goaltending

Player	MIN	GP	W	L	T	GA	GAA	SO
Frank Brimsek	3600	60	26	23	11	175	2.92	3
Team:	3600	60	26	23	11	175	2.92	3

=== Playoffs ===
Scoring

Player	Pos	GP	G	A	Pts	PIM
Milt Schmidt	C/D	5	3	1	4	4
Ken Smith	LW	5	3	0	3	2
Joe Carveth	RW	5	2	1	3	0
Terry Reardon	C/RW	5	0	3	3	2
Bobby Bauer	RW	5	1	1	2	0
Woody Dumart	LW	5	1	1	2	8
Bill Cowley	C	5	0	2	2	0
Pat Egan	D	5	0	2	2	6
Bep Guidolin	LW	3	0	1	1	6
Clare Martin	D	5	0	1	1	0
Frank Brimsek	G	5	0	0	0	0
Jack Crawford	D	2	0	0	0	0
Fern Flaman	D	5	0	0	0	8
Don Gallinger	C	4	0	0	0	7
Murray Henderson	D	4	0	0	0	4
Pentti Lund	RW	1	0	0	0	0
Mark Marquess	RW	4	0	0	0	0
Jack McGill	C	5	0	0	0	11

Goaltending

Player	MIN	GP	W	L	GA	GAA	SO
Frank Brimsek	343	5	1	4	16	2.80	0
Team:	343	5	1	4	16	2.80	0

Note:

Pos = Position;GP = Games played; G = Goals; A = Assists; Pts = Points; PIM = Penalty minutes; +/- = Plus/minus; PPG = Power-play goals; SHG = Short-handed goals; GWG = Game-winning goals
Pos = Position;GP = Games played; Min, TOI = Minutes played; W = Wins; L = Losses; T,T/OT = Ties; OTL = Overtime losses; GA = Goals-against; GAA = Goals-against average; SO = Shutouts; SA = Shots against; SV = Shots saved;SV% = Save percentage;

== See also ==
- 1946–47 NHL season
