= Doug Lewis (ice hockey) =

Canadian ice hockey player (1921 - 1994)

- Born: March 3, 1921 Winnipeg, Manitoba, Canada
- Died: August 10, 1994 (aged 73) Winnipeg, Manitoba, Canada
- Height: 5 ft 8 in (173 cm)
- Weight: 155 lb (70 kg; 11 st 1 lb)
- Position: Left Wing
- Shot: Left
- Played for: Montreal Canadiens
- Playing career: 1941–1947

Douglas Ian Lewis (March 3, 1921 – August 10, 1994) was a Canadian professional ice hockey forward. He played three games in the National Hockey League for the Montreal Canadiens during the 1946–47 season. The rest of his career, which lasted from 1941 to 1954, was spent in the minor leagues. He was born in Winnipeg, Manitoba.

== Career statistics ==
=== Regular season and playoffs ===
			Regular season					Playoffs
Season	Team	League	GP	G	A	Pts	PIM	GP	G	A	Pts	PIM
1938–39	East Kildonan Bisons	MAHA	—	—	—	—	—	—	—	—	—	—
1939–40	Kenora Thistles	MJHL	23	8	6	14	6	18	2	0	2	14
1939–40	Kenora Thistles	M-Cup	—	—	—	—	—	10	1	0	1	12
1940–41	Edmonton Athletic Club	EJrHL	16	6	7	13	16	5	1	3	4	7
1940–41	Edmonton Athletic Club	M-Cup	—	—	—	—	—	5	3	0	3	4
1941–42	Springfield Indians	AHL	56	9	25	34	15	5	0	3	3	0
1942–43	Buffalo Bisons	AHL	55	9	27	36	21	7	0	4	4	7
1943–44	Winnipeg HCMS Chippewas	WNDHL	10	3	2	5	8	—	—	—	—	—
1943–44	Cornwallis Navy	NSDHL	2	2	4	6	2	1	1	1	2	0
1944–45	Buffalo Bisons	AHL	56	15	27	42	19	6	0	1	1	0
1945–46	Buffalo Bisons	AHL	62	20	32	52	8	2	0	0	0	0
1946–47	Montreal Canadiens	NHL	3	0	0	0	0	—	—	—	—	—
1946–47	Buffalo Bisons	AHL	55	10	25	35	16	4	0	1	1	0
1947–48	Buffalo Bisons	AHL	67	20	24	44	12	8	2	1	3	2
1948–49	Buffalo Bisons	AHL	64	22	16	38	23	—	—	—	—	—
1949–50	Buffalo Bisons	AHL	70	9	20	29	30	5	1	0	1	0
1950–51	Seattle Ironmen	PCHL	29	11	4	15	4	—	—	—	—	—
1950–51	Boston Olympics	EAHL	17	5	1	6	6	—	—	—	—	—
1951–52	Halifax St. Mary's	MMHL	46	10	8	18	0	—	—	—	—	—
1952–53	Winnipeg Maroons	MAHA	—	—	—	—	—	—	—	—	—	—
1952–53	Winnipeg Maroons	Al-Cup	—	—	—	—	—	5	1	1	2	12
1953–54	Winnipeg Maroons	MAHA	—	—	—	—	—	—	—	—	—	—
1953–54	Winnipeg Maroons	Al-Cup	—	—	—	—	—	2	2	0	2	0
AHL totals			485	114	196	310	144	37	3	10	13	9
NHL totals			3	0	0	0	0	—	—	—	—	—
