= Levandoski =

Levandoski is a surname. Notable people with the surname include:

- Alana Levandoski, folk musician
- Joe Levandoski (1921–2001), professional ice hockey player
