= Mark Marquess (ice hockey) =

Canadian ice hockey player (1925–2015)

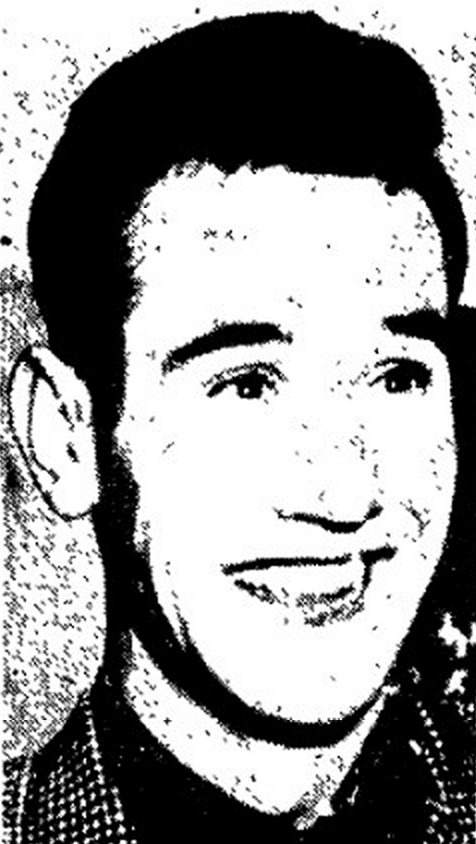
- Born: March 26, 1925 Bassano, Alberta, Canada
- Died: January 19, 2015 (aged 89) East Wenatchee, Washington, U.S.
- Height: 5 ft 8 in (173 cm)
- Weight: 160 lb (73 kg; 11 st 6 lb)
- Position: Right wing
- Shot: Right
- Played for: Boston Bruins
- Playing career: 1945–1956

Clarence Emmett "Mark" Marquess (March 26, 1925 — January 19, 2015) was a Canadian-born American professional ice hockey player who played 27 games in the National Hockey League with the Boston Bruins during the 1946–47 season in which he recorded five goals and four assists for a total of nine NHL points. His first goal came in a home game versus the Chicago Back Hawks on January 15, 1947. Marquess scored two goals in that contest--one of which was the game-winning tally. Boston won the game, 6-3. Marquess appeared in four Boston playoff games in the spring of 1947 but failed to record a point. Marquess was born in Bassano, Alberta, but grew up in Ashland, Oregon.

The rest of his career lasted from 1945 to 1958 and was spent in various minor leagues. He died in 2015, aged 89 at his home in East Wenatchee, Washington.

== Career statistics ==
=== Regular season and playoffs ===
			Regular season					Playoffs
Season	Team	League	GP	G	A	Pts	PIM	GP	G	A	Pts	PIM
1943–44	Trail Smoke Eaters	Exhib	—	—	—	—	—	—	—	—	—	—
1943–44	Trail Smoke Eaters	M-Cup	—	—	—	—	—	17	8	11	19	9
1944–45	Moose Jaw Canucks	S-SJHL	15	19	19	38	4	4	7	1	8	0
1944–45	Moose Jaw Canucks	M-Cup	—	—	—	—	—	16	19	8	27	8
1945–46	Boston Olympics	EAHL	36	18	22	40	10	12	7	6	13	2
1946–47	Boston Bruins	NHL	27	5	4	9	6	4	0	0	0	0
1946–47	Hershey Bears	AHL	27	10	13	23	14	—	—	—	—	—
1947–48	Hershey Bears	AHL	63	21	27	48	25	2	0	1	1	2
1948–49	Hershey Bears	AHL	58	25	23	48	33	11	3	8	11	4
1949–50	Hershey Bears	AHL	70	12	22	34	38	—	—	—	—	—
1950–51	Hershey Bears	AHL	57	9	27	36	32	5	1	2	3	2
1951–52	Tacoma Rockets	PCHL	70	17	38	55	67	7	6	2	8	8
1952–53	Tacoma Rockets	WHL	70	25	30	55	34	—	—	—	—	—
1953–54	Seattle Bombers	WHL	70	28	23	51	48	—	—	—	—	—
1954–55	Vancouver Canucks	WHL	70	12	20	32	32	5	1	0	1	4
1955–56	Victoria Cougars	WHL	65	11	25	36	51	15	3	6	9	6
1956–57	Kamloops Chiefs	OSHL	39	15	28	43	23	5	0	3	3	2
1957–58	Kamloops Chiefs	OSHL	47	13	26	39	19	15	8	4	12	6
PCHL/WHL totals			345	93	136	229	232	27	10	8	18	18
NHL totals			27	5	4	9	6	4	0	0	0	0
