= 1946–47 Chicago Black Hawks season =

NHL ice hockey team season

1946–47 Chicago Black Hawks
- League: 6th NHL
- 1946–47 record: 19–37–4
- Home record: 10–17–3
- Road record: 9–20–1
- Goals for: 193
- Goals against: 274

Team information
- General manager: Bill Tobin
- Coach: Johnny Gottselig
- Captain: Red Hamill
- Arena: Chicago Stadium

Team leaders
- Goals: Max Bentley (29)
- Assists: Max Bentley (43)
- Points: Max Bentley (72)
- Penalty minutes: John Mariucci (110)
- Wins: Paul Bibeault (13)
- Goals against average: Paul Bibeault (4.15)

The 1946–47 Chicago Black Hawks season was the team's 21st season in the National Hockey League, and they were coming off a 3rd place regular season finish in 1945–46, followed by being swept by the Montreal Canadiens in the first round of the playoffs.

The Black Hawks would struggle all season long in 1946–47, allowing a league high 274 goals, which was 81 goals higher than the next closest team. The team had the 2nd highest offense in the league though, scoring 193 goals. Despite the NHL raising its schedule length to 60 games, the Hawks would not even be close to reaching its point total from the previous season, earning a league low 42 points, and finishing 13 points out of a playoff spot.

Offensively, the Hawks were led by Max Bentley, who led the NHL in points with 72, and he led the Black Hawks with 29 goals and 43 assists. Doug Bentley would earn 55 points, while Bill Mosienko would score 25 goals and 52 points. Alex Kaleta (24), team captain Red Hamill (21), and Hully Gee (20) would all reach the 20 goal plateau. On defense, teenager Bill Gadsby would lead the team with 18 points, while John Mariucci would set a team record for penalty minutes in a season, with 110.

In goal, the Hawks acquired Paul Bibeault from the Montreal Canadiens, and he would lead the team with 13 wins, and had a 4.15 GAA, along with a shutout. Emile Francis would also get some playing time, earning 6 wins, while posting a 5.47 GAA.

== Season standings ==
National Hockey League
| | | GP | W | L | T | GF | GA | DIFF | Pts |
|---|---|---|---|---|---|---|---|---|---|
| 1 | Montreal Canadiens | 60 | 34 | 16 | 10 | 189 | 138 | +51 | 78 |
| 2 | Toronto Maple Leafs | 60 | 31 | 19 | 10 | 209 | 172 | +37 | 72 |
| 3 | Boston Bruins | 60 | 26 | 23 | 11 | 190 | 175 | +15 | 63 |
| 4 | Detroit Red Wings | 60 | 22 | 27 | 11 | 190 | 193 | −3 | 55 |
| 5 | New York Rangers | 60 | 22 | 32 | 6 | 167 | 186 | −19 | 50 |
| 6 | Chicago Black Hawks | 60 | 19 | 37 | 4 | 193 | 274 | −81 | 42 |

=== Record vs. opponents ===
1946–47 NHL Records
| Team | BOS | CHI | DET | MTL | NYR | TOR |
|---|---|---|---|---|---|---|
| Boston | — | 6–5–1 | 6–3–3 | 1–9–2 | 7–3–2 | 5–5–2 |
| Chicago | 5–6–1 | — | 4–7–1 | 3–8–1 | 4–8 | 3–8–1 |
| Detroit | 3–6–3 | 7–4–1 | — | 4–6–2 | 6–3–3 | 2–8–2 |
| Montreal | 9–1–2 | 8–3–1 | 6–4–2 | — | 6–5–1 | 5–3–4 |
| New York | 3–7–2 | 8–4 | 3–6–3 | 5–6–1 | — | 4–8 |
| Toronto | 5–5–2 | 8–3–1 | 8–2–2 | 3–5–4 | 8–4 | — |

== Schedule and results ==
1946–47 regular season
October

| Game | Date | Visitor | Score | Home | Record | Points |
|---|---|---|---|---|---|---|
| 1 | October 20 | Chicago Black Hawks | 2–2 | Boston Bruins | 0–0–1 | 1 |
| 2 | October 23 | Chicago Black Hawks | 6–5 | Detroit Red Wings | 1–0–1 | 3 |
| 3 | October 26 | Chicago Black Hawks | 1–2 | Toronto Maple Leafs | 1–1–1 | 3 |
| 4 | October 30 | Toronto Maple Leafs | 5–2 | Chicago Black Hawks | 1–2–1 | 3 |

November

| Game | Date | Visitor | Score | Home | Record | Points |
|---|---|---|---|---|---|---|
| 5 | November 3 | Boston Bruins | 3–5 | Chicago Black Hawks | 2–2–1 | 5 |
| 6 | November 6 | New York Rangers | 2–6 | Chicago Black Hawks | 3–2–1 | 7 |
| 7 | November 7 | Chicago Black Hawks | 3–4 | Montreal Canadiens | 3–3–1 | 7 |
| 8 | November 10 | Toronto Maple Leafs | 4–2 | Chicago Black Hawks | 3–4–1 | 7 |
| 9 | November 16 | Chicago Black Hawks | 6–2 | New York Rangers | 4–4–1 | 9 |
| 10 | November 17 | Chicago Black Hawks | 2–5 | Detroit Red Wings | 4–5–1 | 9 |
| 11 | November 20 | Detroit Red Wings | 8–6 | Chicago Black Hawks | 4–6–1 | 9 |
| 12 | November 24 | New York Rangers | 5–1 | Chicago Black Hawks | 4–7–1 | 9 |
| 13 | November 27 | Toronto Maple Leafs | 2–5 | Chicago Black Hawks | 5–7–1 | 11 |
| 14 | November 30 | Chicago Black Hawks | 0–11 | Toronto Maple Leafs | 5–8–1 | 11 |

December

| Game | Date | Visitor | Score | Home | Record | Points |
|---|---|---|---|---|---|---|
| 15 | December 1 | New York Rangers | 2–1 | Chicago Black Hawks | 5–9–1 | 11 |
| 16 | December 3 | Chicago Black Hawks | 1–4 | Montreal Canadiens | 5–10–1 | 11 |
| 17 | December 4 | Detroit Red Wings | 0–0 | Chicago Black Hawks | 5–10–2 | 12 |
| 18 | December 8 | Montreal Canadiens | 5–3 | Chicago Black Hawks | 5–11–2 | 12 |
| 19 | December 11 | Chicago Black Hawks | 1–4 | Boston Bruins | 5–12–2 | 12 |
| 20 | December 15 | Toronto Maple Leafs | 4–3 | Chicago Black Hawks | 5–13–2 | 12 |
| 21 | December 18 | Detroit Red Wings | 2–5 | Chicago Black Hawks | 6–13–2 | 14 |
| 22 | December 21 | Chicago Black Hawks | 1–3 | Toronto Maple Leafs | 6–14–2 | 14 |
| 23 | December 22 | Boston Bruins | 1–5 | Chicago Black Hawks | 7–14–2 | 16 |
| 24 | December 25 | Chicago Black Hawks | 5–3 | Boston Bruins | 8–14–2 | 18 |
| 25 | December 28 | Chicago Black Hawks | 2–8 | Montreal Canadiens | 8–15–2 | 18 |

January

| Game | Date | Visitor | Score | Home | Record | Points |
|---|---|---|---|---|---|---|
| 26 | January 1 | Montreal Canadiens | 5–2 | Chicago Black Hawks | 8–16–2 | 18 |
| 27 | January 5 | Chicago Black Hawks | 0–9 | New York Rangers | 8–17–2 | 18 |
| 28 | January 8 | Chicago Black Hawks | 4–10 | Toronto Maple Leafs | 8–18–2 | 18 |
| 29 | January 9 | Chicago Black Hawks | 6–4 | Detroit Red Wings | 9–18–2 | 20 |
| 30 | January 11 | Chicago Black Hawks | 2–1 | Montreal Canadiens | 10–18–2 | 22 |
| 31 | January 12 | Montreal Canadiens | 1–3 | Chicago Black Hawks | 11–18–2 | 24 |
| 32 | January 15 | Chicago Black Hawks | 3–6 | Boston Bruins | 11–19–2 | 24 |
| 33 | January 18 | Chicago Black Hawks | 1–3 | Boston Bruins | 11–20–2 | 24 |
| 34 | January 19 | Chicago Black Hawks | 3–5 | New York Rangers | 11–21–2 | 24 |
| 35 | January 22 | New York Rangers | 4–2 | Chicago Black Hawks | 11–22–2 | 24 |
| 36 | January 23 | Chicago Black Hawks | 2–8 | Detroit Red Wings | 11–23–2 | 24 |
| 37 | January 26 | Toronto Maple Leafs | 6–6 | Chicago Black Hawks | 11–23–3 | 25 |
| 38 | January 28 | Montreal Canadiens | 4–2 | Chicago Black Hawks | 11–24–3 | 25 |

February

| Game | Date | Visitor | Score | Home | Record | Points |
|---|---|---|---|---|---|---|
| 39 | February 1 | Chicago Black Hawks | 5–4 | Toronto Maple Leafs | 12–24–3 | 27 |
| 40 | February 2 | Boston Bruins | 1–3 | Chicago Black Hawks | 13–24–3 | 29 |
| 41 | February 5 | New York Rangers | 3–2 | Chicago Black Hawks | 13–25–3 | 29 |
| 42 | February 9 | Boston Bruins | 4–6 | Chicago Black Hawks | 14–25–3 | 31 |
| 43 | February 12 | Montreal Canadiens | 1–1 | Chicago Black Hawks | 14–25–4 | 32 |
| 44 | February 15 | Chicago Black Hawks | 1–5 | Detroit Red Wings | 14–26–4 | 32 |
| 45 | February 16 | Detroit Red Wings | 2–3 | Chicago Black Hawks | 15–26–4 | 34 |
| 46 | February 19 | Toronto Maple Leafs | 3–5 | Chicago Black Hawks | 16–26–4 | 36 |
| 47 | February 23 | Boston Bruins | 9–4 | Chicago Black Hawks | 16–27–4 | 36 |
| 48 | February 26 | Chicago Black Hawks | 9–7 | New York Rangers | 17–27–4 | 38 |
| 49 | February 27 | Chicago Black Hawks | 5–6 | Montreal Canadiens | 17–28–4 | 38 |

March

| Game | Date | Visitor | Score | Home | Record | Points |
|---|---|---|---|---|---|---|
| 50 | March 2 | Detroit Red Wings | 3–1 | Chicago Black Hawks | 17–29–4 | 38 |
| 51 | March 3 | Chicago Black Hawks | 9–4 | New York Rangers | 18–29–4 | 40 |
| 52 | March 5 | New York Rangers | 3–1 | Chicago Black Hawks | 18–30–4 | 40 |
| 53 | March 8 | Chicago Black Hawks | 4–12 | Toronto Maple Leafs | 18–31–4 | 40 |
| 54 | March 9 | Montreal Canadiens | 4–1 | Chicago Black Hawks | 18–32–4 | 40 |
| 55 | March 12 | Boston Bruins | 8–3 | Chicago Black Hawks | 18–33–4 | 40 |
| 56 | March 15 | Chicago Black Hawks | 3–8 | Detroit Red Wings | 18–34–4 | 40 |
| 57 | March 16 | Detroit Red Wings | 10–6 | Chicago Black Hawks | 18–35–4 | 40 |
| 58 | March 19 | Chicago Black Hawks | 3–7 | Boston Bruins | 18–36–4 | 40 |
| 59 | March 22 | Chicago Black Hawks | 5–4 | Montreal Canadiens | 19–36–4 | 42 |
| 60 | March 23 | Chicago Black Hawks | 3–4 | New York Rangers | 19–37–4 | 42 |

Legend: Win (2 points) Loss (0 points) Tie (1 point)

== Player stats ==
=== Scoring leaders ===
| Player | GP | G | A | Pts | PIM |
|---|---|---|---|---|---|
| Max Bentley | 60 | 29 | 43 | 72 | 12 |
| Doug Bentley | 52 | 21 | 34 | 55 | 18 |
| Bill Mosienko | 59 | 25 | 27 | 52 | 2 |
| Alex Kaleta | 57 | 24 | 20 | 44 | 37 |
| Red Hamill | 60 | 21 | 19 | 40 | 12 |

=== Goaltending ===
| Player | GP | TOI | W | L | T | GA | SO | GAA |
| Paul Bibeault | 41 | 2460 | 13 | 25 | 3 | 170 | 1 | 4.15 |
| Emile Francis | 19 | 1140 | 6 | 12 | 1 | 104 | 0 | 5.47 |

== See also ==
- 1946–47 NHL season
