= Jim Conacher =

Scottish-born Canadian ice hockey player (1921–2020)

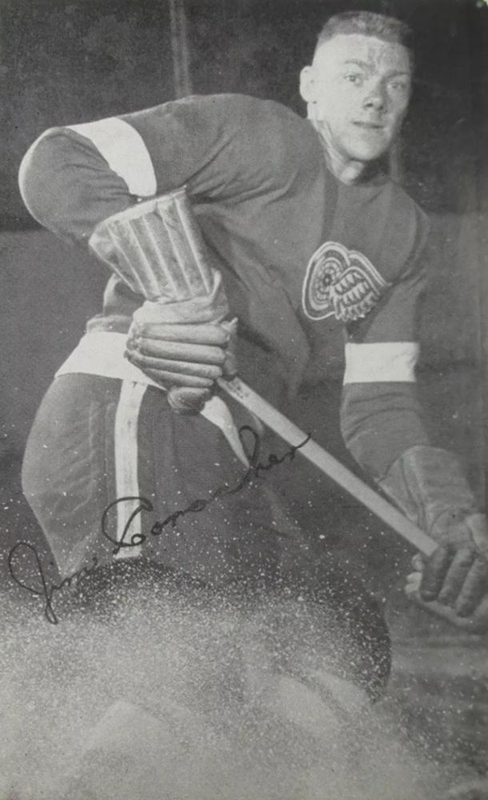
- Conacher in 1947 postcard
- Born: May 5, 1921 Motherwell, Scotland
- Died: April 9, 2020 (aged 98) Vancouver, British Columbia, Canada
- Height: 5 ft 10 in (178 cm)
- Weight: 155 lb (70 kg; 11 st 1 lb)
- Position: Centre
- Shot: Left
- Played for: Detroit Red Wings; Chicago Black Hawks; New York Rangers
- Playing career: 1945–1953

James Conacher (May 5, 1921 – April 9, 2020) was a Canadian ice hockey forward. He played in the National Hockey League with the Detroit Red Wings, Chicago Black Hawks, and New York Rangers between 1945 and 1952. Conacher was born in Motherwell, Scotland, United Kingdom and raised in Toronto, Ontario.

== Life and career ==
Conacher started his National Hockey League career with the Detroit Red Wings. He went on to play with the New York Rangers and Chicago Black Hawks. Conacher recorded 85 goals and 117 assists for 202 points in 328 career NHL games. After his hockey career, he worked as an advertising salesman for newspaper companies in Toronto. After Chick Webster's death in January 2018, he became the oldest living former NHL player.

Conacher was married to Bonnie, who died in November 2013. He later resided in West Vancouver, British Columbia. The couple were active in the Vancouver Lions Gate Hospital Foundation. Conacher died on April 9, 2020, at the age of 98.

== Career statistics ==
=== Regular season and playoffs ===
			Regular season					Playoffs
Season	Team	League	GP	G	A	Pts	PIM	GP	G	A	Pts	PIM
1938–39	Toronto Young Rangers	OHA	8	2	1	3	0	3	0	1	1	0
1939–40	Toronto Young Rangers	OHA	16	13	9	22	8	2	2	0	2	0
1940–41	Oshawa Generals	OHA	16	17	15	32	8	12	6	8	14	10
1940–41	Toronto Donnell-Mudge	TMHL	—	—	—	—	—	—	—	—	—	—
1940–41	Oshawa Generals	M-Cup	—	—	—	—	—	5	2	5	7	2
1941–42	Omaha Knights	AHA	47	21	23	44	22	8	5	7	12	10
1942–43	Cornwall Army	QSHL	26	3	18	21	12	—	—	—	—	—
1943–44	Toronto Tip Tops	TIHL	3	1	4	5	0	—	—	—	—	—
1944–45	Toronto Tip Tops	TIHL	1	1	0	1	0	—	—	—	—	—
1945–46	Detroit Red Wings	NHL	20	1	5	6	6	5	1	1	2	0
1945–46	Indianapolis Capitals	AHL	32	17	30	47	6	—	—	—	—	—
1946–47	Detroit Red Wings	NHL	33	16	13	29	2	5	2	1	3	2
1946–47	Indianapolis Capitals	AHL	24	15	18	33	6	—	—	—	—	—
1947–48	Detroit Red Wings	NHL	60	17	23	40	2	9	2	0	2	2
1948–49	Detroit Red Wings	NHL	4	1	0	1	2	—	—	—	—	—
1948–49	Chicago Black Hawks	NHL	55	25	23	48	41	—	—	—	—	—
1949–50	Chicago Black Hawks	NHL	66	13	20	33	14	—	—	—	—	—
1950–51	Chicago Black Hawks	NHL	52	10	27	37	16	—	—	—	—	—
1950–51	Milwaukee Sea Gulls	USHL	9	2	4	6	2	—	—	—	—	—
1951–52	Chicago Black Hawks	NHL	5	1	1	2	0	—	—	—	—	—
1951–52	New York Rangers	NHL	16	0	1	1	2	—	—	—	—	—
1952–53	New York Rangers	NHL	17	1	4	5	2	—	—	—	—	—
1952–53	Buffalo Bisons	AHL	34	6	21	27	19	—	—	—	—	—
NHL totals			328	85	117	202	87	19	5	2	7	4

== See also ==
- List of National Hockey League players from the United Kingdom
