= Leo Reise =

Canadian ice hockey player

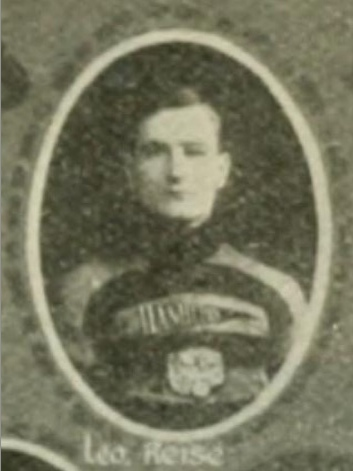
- Born: June 1, 1892 Pembroke, Ontario, Canada
- Died: July 8, 1975 (aged 83)
- Height: 6 ft 0 in (183 cm)
- Weight: 205 lb (93 kg; 14 st 9 lb)
- Position: Defence
- Shot: Left
- Played for: Hamilton Tigers; New York Americans; New York Rangers
- Playing career: 1920–1932

Leopold Adolph Emile Reise, Sr. (June 1, 1892 – July 8, 1975) was a Canadian hockey player who played 8 seasons in the National Hockey League (NHL) for the Hamilton Tigers, New York Americans and New York Rangers. Prior to turning professional in 1920 he played several years for the amateur Hamilton Tigers, joining the professional version when they started and staying for four seasons. He also spent three seasons with the Saskatoon Crescents of the Western Canada Hockey League, and returned to the NHL in 1926 with the New York Americans, spending four seasons with them before finishing his time in the NHL with the New York Rangers. Reise spent two additional seasons in the minor International Hockey League before retiring in 1932. His son, Leo Reise, Jr., also played in the NHL.

== Personal life ==
Reise was born in Pembroke, Ontario. He lost sight in one of his eyes as a child, yet he continued to play hockey. The loss was not the result of an injury but rather due to an optical nerve that simply died.

His son Leo Reise, Jr. won the Stanley Cup twice with the Detroit Red Wings, in 1950 and 1952.

== Career statistics ==
=== Regular season and playoffs ===
			Regular season					Playoffs
Season	Team	League	GP	G	A	Pts	PIM	GP	G	A	Pts	PIM
1913–14	Hamilton Tiger Cubs	OHA Int	—	—	—	—	—	—	—	—	—	—
1913–14	New Liseard Seniors	NOHA	4	1	0	1	—	—	—	—	—	—
1914–15	Hamilton Tigers	OHA Int	—	—	—	—	—	—	—	—	—	—
1915–16	Hamilton Tigers	OHA Int	2	0	0	0	0	—	—	—	—	—
1916–17	Hamilton Tigers	OHA Int	6	8	0	8	—	—	—	—	—	—
1917–18	Hamilton Tigers	OHA	8	8	0	8	—	—	—	—	—	—
1918–19	Hamilton Tigers	OHA	8	5	1	6	—	6	2	0	2	—
1919–20	Hamilton Tigers	OHA	5	8	3	11	—	2	0	0	0	—
1920–21	Hamilton Tigers	OHA	9	4	4	8	—	—	—	—	—	—
1920–21	Hamilton Tigers	NHL	6	2	0	2	8	—	—	—	—	—
1921–22	Hamilton Tigers	NHL	24	9	14	23	8	—	—	—	—	—
1922–23	Hamilton Tigers	NHL	24	6	14	23	8	—	—	—	—	—
1923–24	Hamilton Tigers	NHL	4	0	0	0	4	—	—	—	—	—
1923–24	Saskatoon Sheiks	WCHL	18	4	2	6	6	—	—	—	—	—
1924–25	Saskatoon Sheiks	WCHL	28	8	3	11	46	2	0	0	0	0
1925–26	Saskatoon Sheiks	WHL	30	2	10	12	32	2	0	0	0	4
1926–27	Niagara Falls Cataracts	Can-Pro	3	3	1	4	0	—	—	—	—	—
1926–27	New York Americans	NHL	40	7	6	13	24	—	—	—	—	—
1927–28	New York Americans	NHL	43	8	1	9	62	—	—	—	—	—
1928–29	New York Americans	NHL	44	4	1	5	32	2	0	0	0	0
1929–30	New York Americans	NHL	24	0	0	0	0	—	—	—	—	—
1929–30	New York Rangers	NHL	14	0	1	1	8	4	0	0	0	16
1930–31	London Tecumsehs	IHL	8	0	0	0	6	—	—	—	—	—
1930–31	Pittsburgh Yellow Jackets	IHL	37	5	5	10	18	6	1	2	3	2
1931–32	Pittsburgh Yellow Jackets	IHL	21	0	0	0	19	—	—	—	—	—
NHL totals			223	36	29	65	181	6	0	0	0	16

== Awards and achievements ==
- OHA-Sr. Second All-Star Team (1918, 1921)
- OHA-Sr. First All-Star Team (1920)
