= Leo Reise Jr. =

Canadian ice hockey player

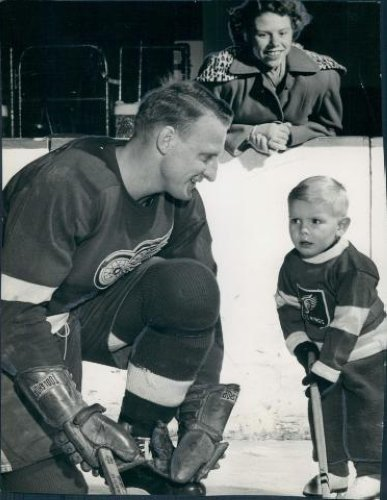
- Reise with his wife Geraldine and son in 1951
- Born: June 7, 1922 Stoney Creek, Ontario, Canada
- Died: July 26, 2015 (aged 93) Hamilton, Ontario, Canada
- Height: 6 ft 0 in (183 cm)
- Weight: 205 lb (93 kg; 14 st 9 lb)
- Position: Defence
- Shot: Left
- Played for: Chicago Black Hawks; Detroit Red Wings; New York Rangers
- Playing career: 1945–1954

Leo Charles Reise Jr. (June 7, 1922 – July 26, 2015) was a professional ice hockey player in the NHL and son of former pro Leo Reise. He was born in Stoney Creek, Ontario.

== Playing career ==
Following junior hockey in Brantford and Guelph, Reise enlisted in the navy where he played for the naval teams of Victoria, Halifax and HMCS CHIPPAWA in Winnipeg where he played on the 1945 Basil Baker trophy-winning team. Leo Reise began his NHL career following the end of World War II playing six games with the Chicago Black Hawks in the 1945–46 NHL season. Reise was the first son of a former NHL player to also join the league. After playing 17 games with Chicago the next season, he was traded to the Detroit Red Wings where he remained until the end of the 1951–52 NHL season. He finished his last two seasons, 1952–53 and 1953–54, with the New York Rangers, with whom his father had also concluded his NHL career. In 494 NHL games, he recorded 28 goals and 109 points. He won two Stanley Cups with the Detroit Red Wings in 1950 and 1952.

== Post hockey ==
After his hockey career Reise went on to running a plumbing business in the Hamilton area.

Reise died of cancer on July 26, 2015, at the age of 93.

== Awards and achievements ==
- USHL first All-Star team (1946)
- NHL Second All-Star team (1950, 1951)
- Played in NHL All-Star Game (1950, 1951, 1952, 1953)

== Career statistics ==
			Regular season					Playoffs
Season	Team	League	GP	G	A	Pts	PIM	GP	G	A	Pts	PIM
1939–40	Brantford Lions	Big-10 Jr. B	12	12	4	16	36	11	9	8	17	10
1939–40	Brantford Lions	M-Cup	—	—	—	—	—	2	1	5	6	5
1940–41	Brantford Lions	Big-10 Jr. B	10	8	7	15	32	16	12	11	23	22
1940–41	Brantford Lions	M-Cup	—	—	—	—	—	11	10	11	21	20
1941–42	Guelph Biltmores	OHA-Jr.	14	5	7	12	28	10	1	3	4	22
1943–44	Victoria Navy	NNDHL	17	1	2	3	24	—	—	—	—	—
1943–44	Halifax Navy	NNDHL	—	—	—	—	—	4	0	0	0	2
1944–45	Winnipeg Navy	WNDHL	17	9	2	11	26	6	1	2	3	11
1945–46	Chicago Black Hawks	NHL	6	0	0	0	6	—	—	—	—	—
1945–46	Kansas City Pla-Mors	USHL	50	7	18	25	30	—	—	—	—	—
1946–47	Chicago Black Hawks	NHL	17	0	0	0	18	—	—	—	—	—
1946–47	Kansas City Pla-Mors	USHL	2	0	1	1	0	—	—	—	—	—
1946–47	Indianapolis Capitals	AHL	5	0	4	4	8	—	—	—	—	—
1946–47	Detroit Red Wings	NHL	31	4	6	10	14	5	0	1	1	4
1947–48	Detroit Red Wings	NHL	58	5	4	9	30	10	2	1	3	12
1948–49	Detroit Red Wings	NHL	59	3	7	10	60	11	1	0	1	4
1949–50	Detroit Red Wings	NHL	70	4	17	21	46	14	2	0	2	19
1950–51	Detroit Red Wings	NHL	68	5	16	21	67	6	2	3	5	2
1951–52	Detroit Red Wings	NHL	54	0	11	11	34	6	1	0	1	27
1952–53	New York Rangers	NHL	61	4	15	19	53	—	—	—	—	—
1953–54	New York Rangers	NHL	70	3	5	8	71	—	—	—	—	—
1954–55	Owen Sound Mercurys	OHA-Sr.	8	1	1	2	4	5	1	1	2	6
NHL totals			494	28	81	109	399	52	8	5	13	68
