= Cliff Simpson =

Cliff Simpson may refer to:

- Cliff Simpson (ice hockey) (1923–1987), Canadian ice hockey player
- Cliff Simpson (sprinter) (1928–2023), New Zealand sprinter
