= Jean-Paul Denis =

Canadian ice hockey player

- Born: February 28, 1924; Montreal, Quebec, Canada
- Died: January 3, 1989 (aged 64)
- Height: 5 ft 8 in (173 cm)
- Weight: 170 lb (77 kg; 12 st 2 lb)
- Position: Right wing
- Shot: Right
- Played for: New York Rangers
- Playing career: 1944–1962

Joseph Gabriel Jean-Paul "Johnny" Denis (February 28, 1924 – January 3, 1989) was a Canadian ice hockey player who played ten games in the National Hockey League with the New York Rangers during the 1946–47 and 1949–50 seasons. The rest of his career, which lasted from 1944 to 1962, was spent in the minor leagues. Denis was born in Montreal, Quebec.

== Career statistics ==
=== Regular season and playoffs ===
			Regular season					Playoffs
Season	Team	League	GP	G	A	Pts	PIM	GP	G	A	Pts	PIM
1941–42	Montreal Concordia Civics	MMJHL	12	11	6	17	2	2	2	2	4	0
1942–43	Montreal Concordia Civics	MMJHL	20	13	9	22	13	4	1	0	1	2
1943–44	Montreal Concordia Civics	QJHL	10	4	4	8	14	5	3	1	4	6
1943–44	University of Montreal	QSHL	2	0	1	1	0	—	—	—	—	—
1943–44	Montreal Junior Royals	M-Cup	—	—	—	—	—	4	2	4	6	2
1944–45	Hull Volants	QSHL	2	0	0	0	0	—	—	—	—	—
1944–45	Montreal Army	QSHL	9	10	10	20	7	—	—	—	—	—
1945–46	Montreal Royals	QSHL	69	10	13	23	36	11	0	3	3	9
1946–47	New York Rangers	NHL	6	0	1	1	0	—	—	—	—	—
1946–47	New Haven Ramblers	AHL	26	9	3	12	14	—	—	—	—	—
1946–47	New York Rovers	EAHL	16	6	15	21	15	—	—	—	—	—
1946–47	Montreal Royals	QSHL	1	0	0	0	0	1	0	0	0	0
1947–48	New Haven Ramblers	AHL	65	19	19	38	59	4	0	1	1	0
1948–49	New Haven Ramblers	AHL	63	24	23	47	108	—	—	—	—	—
1949–50	New York Rangers	NHL	4	0	1	1	2	—	—	—	—	—
1949–50	New Haven Ramblers	AHL	65	20	24	44	42	—	—	—	—	—
1950–51	Cincinnati Mohawks	AHL	61	22	31	53	109	—	—	—	—	—
1951–52	Cincinnati Mohawks	AHL	35	15	16	31	53	—	—	—	—	—
1951–52	Providence Reds	AHL	4	2	3	5	4	6	2	0	2	11
1952–53	Providence Reds	AHL	57	21	17	38	74	—	—	—	—	—
1953–54	Quebec Aces	QSHL	6	1	0	1	2	—	—	—	—	—
1953–54	Providence Reds	AHL	15	3	5	8	15	—	—	—	—	—
1954–55	Shawinigan Falls Catractes	QSHL	42	18	25	43	46	13	3	8	11	25
1955–56	Shawinigan Falls Catractes	QSHL	59	24	42	66	63	11	2	3	5	7
1956–57	Shawinigan Falls Catractes	QSHL	62	19	33	52	57	—	—	—	—	—
1957–58	Shawinigan Falls Catractes	QSHL	64	39	50	89	68	8	1	7	8	2
1958–59	Montreal Royals	QSHL	48	22	23	45	69	6	2	0	2	0
1959–60	Trois-Rivières Lions	EPHL	69	30	40	70	51	7	4	1	5	6
1960–61	St. Paul Saints	IHL	67	41	52	93	52	13	8	6	14	9
1961–62	St. Paul Saints	IHL	64	32	56	88	49	11	7	4	11	26
AHL totals			391	135	141	276	478	10	2	1	3	11
QSHL totals			296	133	184	317	312	39	8	18	26	34
NHL totals			10	0	2	2	2	—	—	—	—	—
