= Hugh Millar =

Canadian ice hockey player

- Born: April 3, 1921 Edmonton, Alberta, Canada
- Died: March 2, 1975 (aged 53)
- Height: 5 ft 9 in (175 cm)
- Weight: 200 lb (91 kg; 14 st 4 lb)
- Position: Defence
- Shot: Left
- Played for: Detroit Red Wings
- Playing career: 1941–1948

Hugh Alexander Millar (April 3, 1921 – March 2, 1975) was a Canadian professional ice hockey player who played four games in the National Hockey League for the Detroit Red Wings. He was born in Edmonton, Alberta.

== Career statistics ==
=== Regular season and playoffs ===
			Regular season					Playoffs
Season	Team	League	GP	G	A	Pts	PIM	GP	G	A	Pts	PIM
1937–38	Stony Mountain Climbers	MIHA	—	—	—	—	—	—	—	—	—	—
1938–39	Winnipeg Rangers	MJHL	21	5	7	12	14	—	—	—	—	—
1939–40	Winnipeg Rangers	MJHL	22	9	1	10	27	—	—	—	—	—
1940–41	Winnipeg Rangers	MJHL	14	8	3	11	23	6	4	2	6	2
1940–41	Winnipeg Rangers	M-Cup	—	—	—	—	—	14	8	5	13	21
1941–42	Omaha Knights	AHA	50	3	8	11	34	8	5	1	6	4
1942–43	Winnipeg Navy	WNDHL	12	11	6	17	10	5	4	2	6	4
1943–44	Winnipeg Navy	WNDHL	9	3	2	5	15	—	—	—	—	—
1943–44	Calgary Combines	CNDHL	2	0	0	0	4	3	1	1	2	2
1944–45	Winnipeg Navy	WNDHL	2	0	0	0	2	—	—	—	—	—
1944–45	Cornwallis Navy	NSDHL	12	0	4	4	14	3	0	0	0	2
1945–46	Indianapolis Capitals	AHL	50	6	26	32	26	5	0	1	1	2
1946–47	Detroit Red Wings	NHL	4	0	0	0	0	1	0	0	0	0
1946–47	Indianapolis Capitals	AHL	57	18	12	30	43	—	—	—	—	—
1947–48	Indianapolis Capitals	AHL	68	8	36	44	39	—	—	—	—	—
AHL totals			175	32	74	106	108	5	0	1	1	2
NHL totals			4	0	0	0	0	1	0	0	0	0
