= Gaye Stewart =

Canadian ice hockey player

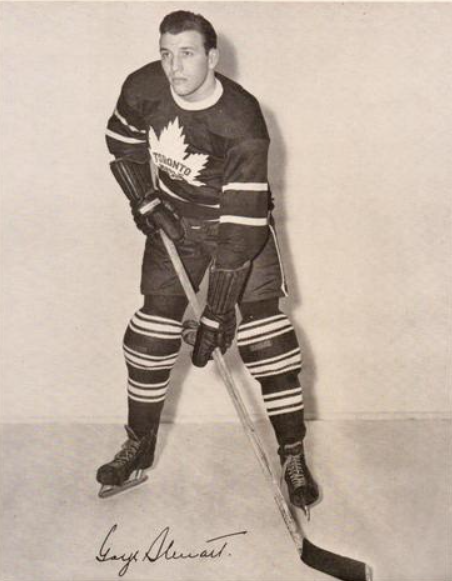
- Born: June 28, 1923 Fort William, Ontario, Canada
- Died: November 18, 2010 (aged 87) Burlington, Ontario, Canada
- Height: 5 ft 11 in (180 cm)
- Weight: 170 lb (77 kg; 12 st 2 lb)
- Position: Left wing
- Shot: Right
- Played for: Toronto Maple Leafs; Chicago Black Hawks; Detroit Red Wings; New York Rangers; Montreal Canadiens
- Playing career: 1941–1955

James Gaye Stewart (June 28, 1923 – November 18, 2010) was a professional ice hockey forward. He played nine seasons as a left winger in the National Hockey League.

== Playing career ==
Born in Fort William, Ontario, Stewart was called from the minors in 1942 to play in one game of the Stanley Cup Final, where he helped the Toronto Maple Leafs win the Stanley Cup. The next season, Stewart won the 1942–43 Calder Memorial Trophy, beating out Maurice 'The Rocket' Richard of the Montreal Canadiens. He became the first player to win the Stanley Cup before the Calder. Danny Grant, Tony Esposito and Ken Dryden have accomplished the feat since then.

After spending two years in the Royal Canadian Navy during World War II, Stewart returned to the NHL in 1945 and had his best season, leading the league with 37 goals - the last time a Leaf led the League in goals before Auston Matthews in 2020–21. Stewart won his second Stanley Cup, again with the Maple Leafs, in 1946–47. Toronto traded Stewart to Chicago early in the 1947–48 season in a deal that brought Max Bentley to the Leafs. Stewart had three 20-goal seasons for the Black Hawks before finishing his career with stints with the Detroit Red Wings, New York Rangers and Montreal Canadiens. In all, Gaye Stewart played for five of the NHL's Original Six teams, all except the Boston Bruins. He played 502 career NHL games, scoring 185 goals and 159 assists for 344 points. Stewart died on November 18, 2010, in a hospital in Burlington, Ontario, at the age of 87.

== Awards and achievements ==
- Stanley Cup champion in 1942 and 1947.
- Calder Memorial Trophy winner in 1943.
- Selected to the NHL First All-Star Team in 1946.
- Selected to the NHL Second All-Star Team in 1948.
- Played in 1947, 1948, 1950 and 1951 NHL All-Star Games.
- Selected to the AHL First All-Star Team in 1954.
- Former last member of the Toronto Maple Leafs to lead the NHL in goals with 37 in 1946.

== Career statistics ==
			Regular season					Playoffs
Season	Team	League	GP	G	A	Pts	PIM	GP	G	A	Pts	PIM
1939–40	Port Arthur Bruins	TBJHL	16	17	6	23	18	5	8	2	10	4
1940–41	Toronto Marlboros	OHA-Jr.	16	31	13	44	16	12	13	7	20	10
1941–42	Toronto Marlboros	OHA-Jr.	13	13	8	21	2	6	3	4	7	4
1941–42	Hershey Bears	AHL	5	4	2	6	0	10	4	5	9	0
1941–42	Toronto Maple Leafs	NHL	—	—	—	—	—	1	0	0	0	0
1942–43	Toronto Maple Leafs	NHL	48	24	23	47	20	4	0	2	2	4
1943–44	Montreal Royals	QSHL	10	4	7	11	8	4	6	2	8	0
1943–44	Montreal Navy	MCHL	6	5	7	12	2	5	7	4	11	4
1944–45	Cornwallis Navy	NSDHL	11	9	7	16	12	3	3	4	7	2
1945–46	Toronto Maple Leafs	NHL	50	37	15	52	8	—	—	—	—	—
1946–47	Toronto Maple Leafs	NHL	60	19	14	33	15	—	—	—	—	—
1946–47	Valleyfield Braves	QSHL	1	1	0	1	0	—	—	—	—	—
1947–48	Toronto Maple Leafs	NHL	7	1	0	1	0	—	—	—	—	—
1947–48	Chicago Black Hawks	NHL	54	26	29	55	83	—	—	—	—	—
1948–49	Chicago Black Hawks	NHL	54	20	18	38	57	—	—	—	—	—
1949–50	Chicago Black Hawks	NHL	70	24	19	43	43	—	—	—	—	—
1950–51	Detroit Red Wings	NHL	67	18	13	31	18	6	0	2	2	4
1951–52	New York Rangers	NHL	69	15	25	40	22	—	—	—	—	—
1952–53	New York Rangers	NHL	18	1	1	2	8	—	—	—	—	—
1952–53	Montreal Canadiens	NHL	5	0	2	2	0	3	0	0	0	0
1952–53	Quebec Aces	QMHL	29	13	20	33	28	22	16	12	28	8
1953–54	Buffalo Bisons	AHL	70	42	53	95	38	3	0	2	2	4
1953–54	Montreal Canadiens	NHL	—	—	—	—	—	3	0	0	0	0
1954–55	Buffalo Bisons	AHL	60	17	19	36	36	—	—	—	—	—
NHL totals			502	185	159	344	274	25	2	9	11	16

Preceded by Grant Warwick	Winner of the Calder Memorial Trophy; 1943	Succeeded by August 'Gus' Bodnar
Preceded by John Mariucci	Chicago Black Hawks captain 1948–49	Succeeded by Doug Bentley
