= Joe Levandoski =

Canadian ice hockey player

- Born: March 17, 1921 Cobalt, Ontario, Canada
- Died: December 20, 2001 (aged 80) Kingston, Ontario, Canada
- Height: 5 ft 11 in (180 cm)
- Weight: 180 lb (82 kg; 12 st 12 lb)
- Position: Defence
- Shot: Left
- Played for: New York Rangers
- Playing career: 1941–1959

Joseph Thomas Levandoski (March 17, 1921 – December 20, 2001) was a Canadian professional ice hockey player. He played eight games in the National Hockey League with the New York Rangers during the 1946–47 season. The rest of his career, which lasted from 1941 to 1959, was spent in the minor leagues. Levandoski was born in Cobalt, Ontario, but grew up in Timmins, Ontario.

== Career statistics ==
=== Regular season and playoffs ===
			Regular season					Playoffs
Season	Team	League	GP	G	A	Pts	PIM	GP	G	A	Pts	PIM
1939–40	Kirkland Lake Gales	GBHL	—	—	—	—	—	—	—	—	—	—
1940–41	Guelph Biltmores	OHA	16	8	6	14	2	5	2	1	3	0
1941–42	Rivervale Skeeters	EAHL	55	26	27	53	51	7	9	4	13	0
1942–43	New Haven Eagles	AHL	28	8	9	17	10	—	—	—	—	—
1942–43	Hershey Bears	AHL	24	9	14	23	21	6	2	0	2	0
1943–44	Petawawa Grenades	UOVHL	6	0	3	3	4	—	—	—	—	—
1944–45	Petawawa Engineers	OVHL	—	—	—	—	—	—	—	—	—	—
1945–46	St. Paul Saints	USHL	55	12	23	35	23	6	1	0	1	4
1946–47	New York Rangers	NHL	8	1	1	2	0	—	—	—	—	—
1946–47	New Haven Ramblers	AHL	47	10	12	22	47	3	2	0	2	2
1947–48	St. Paul Saints	USHL	56	20	24	44	41	—	—	—	—	—
1948–49	St. Paul Saints	USHL	36	9	13	22	40	—	—	—	—	—
1948–49	Buffalo Bisons	AHL	23	6	8	14	6	—	—	—	—	—
1949–50	St. Paul Saints	USHL	61	12	15	27	44	3	1	1	2	4
1950–51	Kansas City Royals	USHL	64	9	31	40	108	—	—	—	—	—
1951–52	Sydney Millionaires	MMHL	81	17	26	43	85	—	—	—	—	—
1952–53	Calgary Stampeders	WHL	70	7	21	28	79	5	1	4	5	0
1953–54	Providence Reds	AHL	61	2	5	7	62	—	—	—	—	—
1953–54	Sherbrooke Saints	QSHL	—	—	—	—	—	2	1	0	1	0
1954–55	Providence Reds	AHL	16	1	3	4	18	—	—	—	—	—
1954–55	Quebec Aces	QSHL	36	2	11	13	42	8	0	2	2	12
1955–56	Quebec Aces	QSHL	8	0	3	3	23	—	—	—	—	—
1955–56	Kingston Goodyears	EOHL	27	8	23	31	80	14	1	11	12	29
1956–57	Kingston CKLCs	EOHL	37	3	8	11	50	5	0	1	1	18
1957–58	Kingston CKLCs	EOHL	49	7	23	30	60	7	0	2	2	20
1958–59	Kingston CKLCs	EOHL	12	2	0	2	12	—	—	—	—	—
AHL totals			199	36	51	87	164	9	4	0	4	2
USHL totals			272	62	106	168	256	9	2	1	3	8
NHL totals			8	1	1	2	0	—	—	—	—	—
