= Cliff Simpson (ice hockey) =

Canadian ice hockey player

- Born: April 4, 1923 Toronto, Ontario, Canada
- Died: May 30, 1987 (aged 64)
- Height: 5 ft 11 in (180 cm)
- Weight: 170 lb (77 kg; 12 st 2 lb)
- Position: Centre
- Shot: Right
- Played for: Detroit Red Wings
- Playing career: 1942–1952

Clifford Vernon Simpson (April 4, 1923 – May 30, 1987) was a Canadian ice hockey player who played six regular season games in the National Hockey League with the Detroit Red Wings during the 1946–47 season and two playoff games with Detroit: one in 1947 and one in 1948. The rest of his career, lasted from 1942 to 1952, and was spent in the minor leagues. Simpson was born in Toronto, Ontario.

== Career statistics ==
=== Regular season and playoffs ===
			Regular season					Playoffs
Season	Team	League	GP	G	A	Pts	PIM	GP	G	A	Pts	PIM
1939–40	Toronto Young Rangers	OHA	20	12	5	17	8	2	0	0	0	0
1940–41	Toronto Young Rangers	OHA	13	11	8	19	17	5	2	3	5	2
1941–42	Brantford Lions	OHA	23	39	26	65	26	7	5	14	19	22
1942–43	Indianapolis Capitals	AHL	18	1	12	13	13	—	—	—	—	—
1942–43	Toronto Army Daggers	OHA Sr	7	12	4	16	12	4	6	3	9	14
1942–43	Toronto Tip Tops	TIHL	1	3	2	5	0	11	16	14	30	10
1943–44	Toronto Tip Tops	TIHL	1	1	0	1	0	—	—	—	—	—
1943–44	Toronto Army Daggers	OHA Sr	1	0	1	1	2	—	—	—	—	—
1944–45	Barriefield Bears	KCHL	15	28	8	36	4	—	—	—	—	—
1944–45	Toronto Bowsers	TMHL	1	2	0	2	0	1	3	1	4	0
1944–45	Toronto Uptown Tires	TMHL	11	20	16	36	32	1	1	3	4	6
1945–46	Indianapolis Capitals	AHL	52	21	15	36	10	5	2	4	6	0
1946–47	Detroit Red Wings	NHL	6	0	1	1	0	1	0	0	0	0
1946–47	Indianapolis Capitals	AHL	54	42	36	78	28	—	—	—	—	—
1947–48	Indianapolis Capitals	AHL	68	48	62	110	31	—	—	—	—	—
1947–48	Detroit Red Wings	NHL	—	—	—	—	—	1	0	0	0	2
1948–49	Indianapolis Capitals	AHL	52	25	21	46	12	2	2	0	2	2
1949–50	St. Louis Flyers	AHL	56	31	52	83	8	2	0	0	0	0
1950–51	St. Louis Flyers	AHL	65	40	34	74	8	—	—	—	—	—
1951–52	St. Louis Flyers	AHL	47	26	26	52	6	—	—	—	—	—
AHL totals			412	234	258	492	116	9	4	4	8	2
NHL totals			6	0	1	1	0	2	0	0	0	0
