= Doug Baldwin (ice hockey) =

Canadian ice hockey player

- Born: November 2, 1922 Winnipeg, Manitoba, Canada
- Died: July 10, 2007 (aged 84) Gimli, Manitoba, Canada
- Height: 6 ft 0 in (183 cm)
- Weight: 175 lb (79 kg; 12 st 7 lb)
- Position: Defence
- Shot: Left
- Played for: Chicago Black Hawks; Detroit Red Wings; Toronto Maple Leafs
- Playing career: 1942–1959

Douglas Colin Roy Baldwin (November 2, 1922 – July 10, 2007) was a Canadian professional ice hockey defenceman who played 24 games in the National Hockey League with the Toronto Maple Leafs, Detroit Red Wings and Chicago Black Hawks between 1945 and 1947. The rest of his career, which lasted from 1942 to 1959, was spent in various minor leagues. He was born in Winnipeg, Manitoba.

== Career statistics ==
=== Regular season and playoffs ===
			Regular season					Playoffs
Season	Team	League	GP	G	A	Pts	PIM	GP	G	A	Pts	PIM
1939–40	Winnipeg Rangers	WJrHL	2	0	0	0	2	—	—	—	—	—
1940–41	Winnipeg Rangers	WJrHL	17	12	5	17	35	6	3	2	5	6
1940–41	Winnipeg Rangers	M-Cup	—	—	—	—	—	7	0	1	1	4
1941–42	Winnipeg Falcons	WJrHL	14	12	6	18	27	6	4	5	9	19
1942–43	Quebec Morton Aces	QSHL	33	0	5	5	4	4	0	1	1	2
1943–44	Quebec Aces	QSHL	25	7	15	22	46	6	4	2	6	14
1943–44	Quebec Aces	Al-Cup	—	—	—	—	—	9	3	6	9	12
1944–45	Quebec Aces	QSHL	17	5	18	23	44	5	2	2	4	0
1944–45	Quebec Aces	Al-Cup	—	—	—	—	—	3	1	1	2	8
1945–46	Toronto Maple Leafs	NHL	15	0	1	1	6	—	—	—	—	—
1945–46	Pittsburgh Hornets	AHL	4	2	2	4	4	—	—	—	—	—
1946–47	Detroit Red Wings	NHL	4	0	0	0	0	—	—	—	—	—
1946–47	Kansas City Pla-Mors	USHL	43	8	16	24	57	12	1	6	7	23
1947–48	Chicago Black Hawks	NHL	5	0	0	0	2	—	—	—	—	—
1947–48	Kansas City Pla-Mors	USHL	58	21	42	63	70	4	0	0	0	0
1948–49	Kansas City Pla-Mors	USHL	38	10	27	37	28	—	—	—	—	—
1948–49	Cleveland Barons	AHL	21	3	4	7	14	—	—	—	—	—
1949–50	Kansas City Pla-Mors	USHL	70	12	36	48	58	3	1	0	1	2
1954–55	Grand Rapids Rockets	IHL	13	1	6	7	4	—	—	—	—	—
1955–56	Windsor Bulldogs	OHA Sr	6	0	0	0	43	—	—	—	—	—
1955–56	Chatham Maroons	OHA Sr	35	6	14	20	—	11	1	6	7	14
1955–56	Chatham Maroons	Al-Cup	—	—	—	—	—	17	0	2	2	20
1956–57	Chatham Maroons	OHA Sr	39	5	18	23	40	—	—	—	—	—
1957–58	Toledo Mercurys	IHL	63	6	22	28	39	—	—	—	—	—
1958–59	Toledo Mercurys	IHL	26	2	5	7	12	—	—	—	—	—
1958–59	Washington Presidents	EHL	11	1	6	7	10	—	—	—	—	—
IHL totals			102	9	33	42	55	—	—	—	—	—
USHL totals			139	39	85	124	155	16	1	6	7	23
NHL totals			24	0	1	1	8	—	—	—	—	—

== Awards and achievements ==
- Turnbull Cup (MJHL) Championship (1941)
- Memorial Cup Championship (1941)
- Allan Cup Championship (1944)
- Paul W. Loudon (USHL) Championship (1947)
- Honoured Member of the Manitoba Hockey Hall of Fame
