= Glen Harmon =

Canadian ice hockey player

- Born: January 2, 1921 Holland, Manitoba, Canada
- Died: March 9, 2007 (aged 86) Mississauga, Ontario, Canada
- Height: 5 ft 8 in (173 cm)
- Weight: 175 lb (79 kg; 12 st 7 lb)
- Position: Defence
- Shot: Left
- Played for: Montreal Canadiens
- Playing career: 1942–1951

David Glen Harmon (January 2, 1921 – March 9, 2007) was a Canadian ice hockey defenceman who played for the Montreal Canadiens from 1942 to 1951. He was born in Holland, Manitoba and died in Mississauga, Ontario.

== Playing career ==
Harmon's professional hockey career officially began on June 27, 1941, when he was acquired by the Montreal Canadiens from the Tulsa Oilers (AHA) through an inter-league draft; he would play for Montreal for the following 9 years, until his retirement from the NHL.

Harmon's first season as a Canadien, 1941–1942, was spent playing with the Montreal Senior Canadiens of the QSHL. It was in November 1942 when Harmon stepped onto the ice of the Montreal Forum to play in his first NHL game.

Harmon helped secure the Stanley Cup twice in his time with the Canadiens, first in the 1943–44 season and again in the 1945–46 season.

Harmon played his last four seasons with the Montreal Royals of the QHL. At the end of the 1954–55 season, Harmon retired.

== Awards and achievements ==
- Turnbull Cup MJHL championship (1941)
- Memorial Cup championship (1941)
- Stanley Cup championships (1944 and 1946)
- NHL Second All-Star Team (1945 and 1949)
- Played in NHL All-Star Game (1949 and 1950)
- "Honoured Member" of the Manitoba Hockey Hall of Fame
- Member of the Manitoba Sports Hall of Fame (2008)

== Career statistics ==
			Regular season					Playoffs
Season	Team	League	GP	G	A	Pts	PIM	GP	G	A	Pts	PIM
1938–39	Brandon Elks	MJHL	17	2	5	7	47	15	4	5	9	38
1938–39	Brandon Elks	M-Cup	—	—	—	—	—	6	2	1	3	18
1939–40	Brandon Elks	MJHL	23	4	10	14	67	2	1	0	1	0
1940–41	Winnipeg Rangers	MJHL	17	5	5	10	42	6	4	1	5	14
1940–41	Winnipeg Rangers	M-Cup	—	—	—	—	—	14	4	5	9	20
1941–42	Montreal Sr. Canadiens	QSHL	39	8	8	16	40	6	0	1	1	6
1942–43	Montreal Canadiens	NHL	27	5	9	14	25	5	0	1	1	2
1942–43	Montreal Sr. Canadiens	QSHL	20	5	8	13	35	—	—	—	—	—
1943–44	Montreal Canadiens	NHL	43	5	16	21	36	9	1	2	3	4
1944–45	Montreal Canadiens	NHL	42	5	8	13	41	6	1	0	1	2
1945–46	Montreal Canadiens	NHL	49	7	10	17	28	9	1	4	5	0
1946–47	Montreal Canadiens	NHL	57	5	9	14	53	11	1	1	2	4
1947–48	Montreal Canadiens	NHL	56	10	4	14	52	—	—	—	—	—
1948–49	Montreal Canadiens	NHL	59	8	12	20	44	7	1	1	2	4
1949–50	Montreal Canadiens	NHL	63	3	16	19	28	5	0	1	1	21
1950–51	Montreal Canadiens	NHL	57	2	12	14	27	1	0	0	0	0
1951–52	Montreal Royals	QMHL	55	5	20	25	33	5	3	4	7	2
1952–53	Montreal Royals	QMHL	58	5	17	22	26	16	5	4	9	4
1953–54	Montreal Royals	QHL	65	8	22	30	31	8	0	2	2	2
1954–55	Montreal Royals	QHL	62	5	22	27	64	14	2	5	7	6
NHL totals			452	50	96	146	334	53	5	10	15	37
QHL/QMHL/QSHL totals			299	36	97	133	229	49	10	16	26	20
