= Vic Lynn =

Canadian ice hockey player (1925-2010)

- Born: January 26, 1925 Saskatoon, Saskatchewan, Canada
- Died: December 6, 2010 (aged 85) Saskatoon, Saskatchewan, Canada
- Height: 5 ft 10 in (178 cm)
- Weight: 185 lb (84 kg; 13 st 3 lb)
- Position: Left wing/Defence
- Shot: Left
- Played for: New York Rangers; Montreal Canadiens; Toronto Maple Leafs; Boston Bruins; Chicago Black Hawks; Detroit Red Wings
- Playing career: 1942–1962

Victor Ivan Lynn (January 26, 1925 – December 6, 2010) was a Canadian professional ice hockey player. He played in the National Hockey League (NHL) from 1943 to 1954. He is the only player to play for each of the Original Six teams.

== Professional career ==
During the 1942–43 season Lynn played one game for the New York Rangers, on February 28, 1943, against the Detroit Red Wings.

In 1944, he joined the Red Wings' organization but was sent to play for the Indianapolis Capitals of the American Hockey League (AHL).

Several years later, after Lynn had been released not only by the Wings, but the Montreal Canadiens as well, and he joined the Buffalo Bisons of the AHL. While there he signed with the Toronto Maple Leafs.

In Toronto, Lynn joined Howie Meeker and Ted Kennedy to form "The K-L-M Line." The trio played for three seasons, and helped the Maple Leafs win the Stanley Cup in 1947, 1948 and 1949.

On November 16, 1950, Lynn was traded to the Boston Bruins with Bill Ezinicki for Fernie Flaman, Leo Boivin, Ken Smith and Phil Maloney, where he played for a short time before heading to the minors with the Cleveland Barons of the AHL. Then, in 1953, he played one final time in the NHL, with the Chicago Black Hawks where he played his final NHL games near the end of the year. His career statistics included 49 goals and 76 assists for 125 points in 327 games. He also registered 274 penalty minutes.

== Coaching career ==
Lynn was the head coach of the Prince Albert Mintos of the SJHL in 1958–59 and of the Saskatoon Quakers of the SSHL in 1962–63.

== Career statistics ==
=== Regular season and playoffs ===
			Regular season					Playoffs
Season	Team	League	GP	G	A	Pts	PIM	GP	G	A	Pts	PIM
1940–41	Saskatoon Embassys	SAHA	—	—	—	—	—	—	—	—	—	—
1941–42	Saskatoon Quakers	NSJHL	7	6	8	14	12	6	0	2	2	10
1941–42	Saskatoon Quakers	M-Cup	—	—	—	—	—	3	1	0	1	12
1942–43	New York Rangers	NHL	1	0	0	0	0	—	—	—	—	—
1942–43	New York Rovers	EAHL	38	4	6	10	122	10	3	3	6	30
1943–44	Detroit Red Wings	NHL	3	0	0	0	4	—	—	—	—	—
1943–44	Indianapolis Capitals	AHL	32	4	5	9	61	—	—	—	—	—
1943–44	Saskatoon Navy	SSHL	—	—	—	—	—	4	2	0	2	13
1944–45	St. Louis Flyers	AHL	60	15	23	38	92	—	—	—	—	—
1945–46	Montreal Canadiens	NHL	2	0	0	0	0	—	—	—	—	—
1945–46	Buffalo Bisons	AHL	53	26	25	51	60	12	5	5	10	10
1946–47	Toronto Maple Leafs	NHL	31	6	14	20	44	11	4	1	5	16
1947–48	Toronto Maple Leafs	NHL	60	12	22	34	53	9	2	5	7	20
1948–49	Toronto Maple Leafs	NHL	52	7	9	16	36	8	0	1	1	2
1949–50	Toronto Maple Leafs	NHL	70	7	13	20	39	7	0	2	2	2
1950–51	Pittsburgh Hornets	AHL	16	2	4	6	17	—	—	—	—	—
1950–51	Boston Bruins	NHL	56	14	6	20	69	5	0	0	0	2
1951–52	Boston Bruins	NHL	12	2	2	4	4	—	—	—	—	—
1951–52	Providence Reds	AHL	5	1	4	5	4	—	—	—	—	—
1951–52	Cleveland Barons	AHL	39	1	4	5	4	5	1	3	4	2
1952–53	Cleveland Barons	AHL	35	11	17	28	46	—	—	—	—	—
1952–53	Chicago Black Hawks	NHL	29	0	10	10	23	7	1	1	2	4
1953–54	Chicago Black Hawks	NHL	11	1	0	1	2	—	—	—	—	—
1953–54	Saskatoon Quakers	WHL	38	11	12	23	14	6	2	3	5	9
1954–55	Saskatoon Quakers	WHL	70	20	24	44	82	—	—	—	—	—
1955–56	Saskatoon Quakers	WHL	64	17	26	43	100	3	0	1	1	6
1956–57	Brandon Regals	WHL	61	10	21	31	137	9	2	7	9	8
1957–58	Saskatoon Regals/St. Paul Saints	WHL	38	13	19	32	49	—	—	—	—	—
1957–58	Sudbury Wolves	OHA Sr	7	0	1	1	8	—	—	—	—	—
1958–59	Saskatoon Quakers	WHL	20	3	8	11	20	—	—	—	—	—
1959–60	Saskatoon Quakers	SSHL	20	10	10	20	30	7	2	8	10	10
1959–60	Saskatoon Quakers	Al-Cup	—	—	—	—	—	2	0	0	0	2
1960–61	Saskatoon Quakers	SSHL	—	—	—	—	—	—	—	—	—	—
1961–62	Saskatoon Quakers	SSHL	12	5	5	10	16	8	1	3	4	6
1961–62	Saskatoon Quakers	Al-Cup	—	—	—	—	—	7	1	4	5	0
1962–63	Saskatoon Quakers	SSHL	18	5	13	18	24	—	—	—	—	—
1963–64	Saskatoon Quakers	SSHL	—	—	—	—	—	—	—	—	—	—
NHL totals			327	49	76	125	274	47	7	10	17	46
