= 1941 Memorial Cup =

Canadian junior ice hockey championship

The Memorial Cup trophy

The 1941 Memorial Cup final was the 23rd junior ice hockey championship of the Canadian Amateur Hockey Association (CAHA). The George Richardson Memorial Trophy champions Montreal Royals of the Quebec Junior Hockey League in Eastern Canada competed against the Abbott Cup champions Winnipeg Rangers of the Manitoba Junior Hockey League in Western Canada. This was the first-ever Memorial Cup to feature a team from Quebec. In a best-of-five series, held at the Montreal Forum in Montreal, Quebec and at Maple Leaf Gardens in Toronto, Ontario, Winnipeg won their 1st Memorial Cup, defeating Montreal 3 games to 2.

The Quebec Amateur Hockey Association (QAHA) wanted more influence into how the CAHA determined the dates and location of playoffs games for the Memorial Cup. When the Montreal Royals advanced to the semifinals, QAHA president Norman Dawe lobbied for games to be played at the Montreal Forum instead of all games in Toronto. The CAHA voted against his request due to budget constraints and travel costs. In the 1941 Memorial Cup final, the Montreal Royals won both games played on home ice, but failed to win the cup since they lost all three games played in Toronto.

== Scores ==
- Game 1: Winnipeg 4-2 Montreal (in Toronto)
- Game 2: Montreal 5-3 Winnipeg (in Montreal)
- Game 3: Winnipeg 6-4 Montreal (in Toronto)
- Game 4: Montreal 4-3 Winnipeg (in Montreal)
- Game 5: Winnipeg 7-4 Montreal (in Toronto)

== Winning roster ==
Doug Baldwin, Bob Ballance, Bernie Bathgate, Tom Bredin, Sam Fabro, Earl Fast, Glen Harmon, Alan Hay, Bill Heindl, Les Hickey, Babe Hobday, Hib Macey, Lou Medynski, Hugh Millar, Bill Mortimer, Mike Peters, Bill Robinson, Hal Thompson. Coach: Baldy Northcott
