= 1946–47 NHL season =

Professional ice hockey league season

- League: National Hockey League
- Sport: Ice hockey
- Duration: October 16, 1946 – April 19, 1947
- Games: 60
- Teams: 6

Regular season
- Season champion: Montreal Canadiens
- Season MVP: Maurice Richard (Canadiens)
- Top scorer: Max Bentley (Black Hawks)

Stanley Cup
- Champions: Toronto Maple Leafs
- Runners-up: Montreal Canadiens

NHL seasons
- ← 1945–46 1947–48 →

The 1946–47 NHL season was the 30th season of the National Hockey League. Six teams played 60 games each. The Toronto Maple Leafs defeated the Montreal Canadiens in the Stanley Cup Finals to win their sixth Stanley Cup championship.

== League business ==
The NHL sought to renegotiate the existing professional-amateur agreement with the Canadian Amateur Hockey Association (CAHA) in May 1946. The NHL proposed a flat payment of C$20,000 to cover all amateur players being signed to professional contracts, whereas the CAHA requested $2,000 for any player remaining in the NHL for more than a year. The flat rate offer was later accepted with the stipulation that a junior-aged player could sign a contract at age 16, but not play professional until age 18.

Tommy Gorman, who had been associated with the National Hockey League since its inception in 1917, announced his retirement in July 1946 as general manager of the Montreal Canadiens. He left behind him seven Stanley Cup champions and a hall of fame career as a coach and general manager. Frank Selke, released from the Toronto Maple Leafs, took over as general manager and would build the greatest dynasty hockey ever known in the late 1950s. The Canadiens were in financial trouble at this time, despite their winning team, and Selke would turn things around by buying up talent and keeping the cream of the crop, selling some players to teams that needed talent.

In December 1946, Selke proposed for professional teams to sponsor junior ice hockey teams under CAHA jurisdiction. The plan spread out talent instead of concentrating it on a few teams, and provided a farm system for the NHL.

Red Dutton finally got to resign as president of the NHL, as Clarence Campbell, whom Frank Calder had been grooming as his successor, had come home from Europe. Campbell's experience in law and in hockey made him an ideal choice as president. Campbell hired Ken McKenzie, who would become the league's first publicity director, in September 1946, as his first hiring. McKenzie would go on to found The Hockey News and other publications, including the annual NHL Guide.

Lorne Chabot, whose outstanding career as goalkeeper brought him two Stanley Cups, a Vezina Trophy and a first all-star selection, died October 10, five days after his 46th birthday. He had been suffering from kidney disease for some time and had been bedridden with severe arthritis.

=== Changes ===
The league extended the season from 50 games to 60 games. Linesmen are to be hired for each game from neutral cities. The system of hand gestures to symbolize penalties, devised by Bill Chadwick, is adopted officially by the NHL. The NHL announces that winners of its trophies, and members of the All-Star team will each receive $1,000. Additionally, the league modified the captaincy rule so that captains wore the letter "C" and assistant captains wear the letter "A" on the front of their jerseys.

== Regular season ==
Detroit lost Syd Howe through retirement, but another Howe started his great career as Gordie Howe was Detroit's new rookie. In one of his first fights, he took care of Montreal's Rocket Richard. Sid Abel then added a taunt that enraged Richard and he broke Abel's nose in three places.

Chicago decided to purchase goaltender Paul Bibeault from Montreal and regretted it. He played badly, one of his losses being an 11–0 whitewashing at the hands of Toronto. Finally, president and general manager Bill Tobin had enough and brought up 20-year-old Emile Francis to replace him. He made his debut on February 9, 1947, in a 6–4 win over Boston. During the season, Maple Leaf Gardens was the first arena in the NHL to have Plexiglas inserted in the end zones of the rink.

A donnybrook took place March 16, 1947, between the New York Rangers and Montreal Canadiens. Cal Gardner lifted Kenny Reardon's stick so that it clipped him in the mouth and a fight broke out between both teams and the fans. On that same night, Billy Taylor of Detroit set an NHL record with 7 assists in a 10–6 shootout win over the Chicago Black Hawks.

Bill Durnan broke George Hainsworth's record of consecutive Vezina Trophies as he won his fourth in a row, and Montreal again finished first. Max Bentley edged out Rocket Richard by one point and won the scoring championship. On February 12, 1947, Dit Clapper played his final game with the Boston Bruins. Before the start of the game, Clapper was inducted into the Hockey Hall of Fame. He was the only active player to be inducted into the Hall. The New York Rangers were the first NHL team to have their home games televised.

=== Final standings ===
National Hockey League
		GP	W	L	T	GF	GA	DIFF	Pts
1	Montreal Canadiens	60	34	16	10	189	138	+51	78
2	Toronto Maple Leafs	60	31	19	10	209	172	+37	72
3	Boston Bruins	60	26	23	11	190	175	+15	63
4	Detroit Red Wings	60	22	27	11	190	193	−3	55
5	New York Rangers	60	22	32	6	167	186	−19	50
6	Chicago Black Hawks	60	19	37	4	193	274	−81	42

== Playoffs ==
=== Playoff bracket ===
The top four teams in the league qualified for the playoffs. In the semifinals, the first-place team played the third-place team, while the second-place team faced the fourth-place team, with the winners advancing to the Stanley Cup Finals. In both rounds, teams competed in a best-of-seven series (scores in the bracket indicate the number of games won in each best-of-seven series).

Semifinals
1	Montreal	4
3	Boston	1
2	Toronto	4
4	Detroit	1

Stanley Cup Finals
1	Montreal	2
2	Toronto	4

=== Semifinals ===
==== (1) Montreal Canadiens vs. (3) Boston Bruins ====
March 25	Boston Bruins	1–3	Montreal Canadiens	Montreal Forum	Recap
Ken Smith (1) – 02:30		First period	05:58 – Toe Blake (1)
No scoring		Second period	No scoring
No scoring		Third period	12:30 – Jimmy Peters (1); 16:27 – John Quilty (1)
Frank Brimsek		Goalie stats	Bill Durnan

March 27	Boston Bruins	1–2	OT	Montreal Canadiens	Montreal Forum	Recap
No scoring		First period		No scoring
Bobby Bauer (1) – 03:02		Second period		No scoring
No scoring		Third period		19:08 – Ken Reardon (1)
No scoring		First overtime period		05:38 – Ken Mosdell (1)
Frank Brimsek		Goalie stats		Bill Durnan

March 29	Montreal Canadiens	2–4	Boston Bruins	Boston Garden	Recap
Maurice Richard (1) – 00:38; Ken Mosdell (2) – 05:28		First period	No scoring
No scoring		Second period	10:45 – Milt Schmidt (1); 12:32 – Joe Carveth (1); 15:30 – Milt Schmidt (2)
No scoring		Third period	14:48 – Woody Dumart (1)
Bill Durnan		Goalie stats	Frank Brimsek

April 1	Montreal Canadiens	5–1	Boston Bruins	Boston Garden	Recap
No scoring		First period	No scoring
Billy Reay (1) – 05:04; John Quilty (2) – 06:31; Billy Reay (2) – 10:38		Second period	16:20 – Ken Smith (2)
Billy Reay (3) – 03:55; Billy Reay (4) – pp – 18:39		Third period	No scoring
Bill Durnan		Goalie stats	Frank Brimsek

April 3	Boston Bruins	3–4	2OT	Montreal Canadiens	Montreal Forum	Recap
No scoring		First period		No scoring
Joe Carveth (2) – 13:52; Milt Schmidt (3) – 14:14		Second period		00:45 – pp – Toe Blake (2)
Ken Smith (3) – 11:40		Third period		07:43 – Maurice Richard (2); 17:55 – Maurice Richard (3)
No scoring		Second overtime period		16:40 – John Quilty (3)
Frank Brimsek		Goalie stats		Bill Durnan

Montreal won series 4–1

==== (2) Toronto Maple Leafs vs. (4) Detroit Red Wings ====
March 26	Detroit Red Wings	2–3	OT	Toronto Maple Leafs	Maple Leaf Gardens	Recap
No scoring		First period		No scoring
Roy Conacher (1) – 02:21		Second period		07:01 – pp – Vic Lynn (1)
Pete Horeck (1) – 16:25		Third period		10:29 – Nick Metz (1)
No scoring		First overtime period		03:05 – Howie Meeker (1)
Red Almas		Goalie stats		Turk Broda

March 29	Detroit Red Wings	9–1	Toronto Maple Leafs	Maple Leaf Gardens	Recap
Ted Lindsay (1) – pp – 03:20; Sid Abel (1) – pp – 04:20		First period	No scoring
Billy Taylor (1) – 02:10		Second period	09:56 – Nick Metz (2)
Ted Lindsay (2) – 05:26; Roy Conacher (2) – 07:57; Pete Horeck (2) – 13:37; Jim Conacher (1) – 17:30; Roy Conacher (3) – 18:30; Eddie Bruneteau (1) – 19:00		Third period	No scoring
Red Almas		Goalie stats	Turk Broda

April 1	Toronto Maple Leafs	4–1	Detroit Red Wings	Olympia Stadium	Recap
Don Metz (1) – 12:41		First period	No scoring
Harry Watson (1) – pp – 16:46		Second period	07:51 – pp – Jim Conacher (2)
Syl Apps (1) – 02:30; Syl Apps (2) – 16:20		Third period	No scoring
Turk Broda		Goalie stats	Red Almas

April 3	Toronto Maple Leafs	4–1	Detroit Red Wings	Olympia Stadium	Recap
Howie Meeker (2) – 15:51		First period	No scoring
Ted Kennedy (1) – 13:13		Second period	06:18 – pp – Roy Conacher (4)
Howie Meeker (3) – 09:11; Syl Apps (3) – 10:59		Third period	No scoring
Turk Broda		Goalie stats	Red Almas

April 5	Detroit Red Wings	1–6	Toronto Maple Leafs	Maple Leaf Gardens	Recap
Fern Gauthier (1) – sh – 17:51		First period	11:52 – sh – Nick Metz (3); 16:00 – sh – Joe Klukay (1)
No scoring		Second period	04:40 – pp – Don Metz (2); 13:16 – Gaye Stewart (1)
No scoring		Third period	08:22 – pp – Nick Metz (4); 14:37 – Syl Apps (4)
Red Almas		Goalie stats	Turk Broda

Toronto won series 4–1

=== Stanley Cup Finals ===
April 8	Toronto Maple Leafs	0–6	Montreal Canadiens	Montreal Forum	Recap
No scoring		First period	02:20 – pp – Buddy O'Connor (1)
No scoring		Second period	08:17 – pp – Billy Reay (5); 09:41 – Maurice Richard (4)
No scoring		Third period	05:40 – George Allen (1); 11:04 – Billy Reay (6); 18:28 – Murph Chamberlain (1)
Turk Broda		Goalie stats	Bill Durnan

April 10	Toronto Maple Leafs	4–0	Montreal Canadiens	Montreal Forum	Recap
Ted Kennedy (2) – pp – 01:12; Vic Lynn (2) – pp – 01:36		First period	No scoring
Gaye Stewart (2) – pp – 06:37		Second period	No scoring
Harry Watson (2) – pp – 11:55		Third period	No scoring
Turk Broda		Goalie stats	Bill Durnan

April 12	Montreal Canadiens	2–4	Toronto Maple Leafs	Maple Leaf Gardens	Recap
No scoring		First period	09:45 – Gus Mortson (1)
Leo Gravelle (1) – 12:33; Buddy O'Connor (2) – 18:30		Second period	04:48 – pp – Bud Poile (1); 12:23 – Vic Lynn (3)
No scoring		Third period	19:13 – Ted Kennedy (3)
Bill Durnan		Goalie stats	Turk Broda

April 15	Montreal Canadiens	1–2	OT	Toronto Maple Leafs	Maple Leaf Gardens	Recap
Glen Harmon (1) – pp – 04:38		First period		06:13 – Harry Watson (3)
No scoring		Second period		No scoring
No scoring		Third period		No scoring
No scoring		First overtime period		16:36 – Syl Apps (5)
Bill Durnan		Goalie stats		Turk Broda

April 17	Toronto Maple Leafs	1–3	Montreal Canadiens	Montreal Forum	Recap
No scoring		First period	01:23 – Maurice Richard (5); 08:29 – Leo Gravelle (2)
No scoring		Second period	19:32 – pp – Maurice Richard (6)
Bud Poile (2) – 13:37		Third period	No scoring
Turk Broda		Goalie stats	Bill Durnan

April 19	Montreal Canadiens	1–2	Toronto Maple Leafs	Maple Leaf Gardens	Recap
Buddy O'Connor (3) – 00:25		First period	No scoring
No scoring		Second period	05:39 – Vic Lynn (4)
No scoring		Third period	14:39 – Ted Kennedy (4)
Bill Durnan		Goalie stats	Turk Broda

Toronto won series 4–2

== Awards ==
Award winners
O'Brien Cup: (Playoff runner-up)	Montreal Canadiens
Prince of Wales Trophy: (Best regular season record)	Montreal Canadiens
Calder Memorial Trophy: (Best first-year player)	Howie Meeker, Toronto Maple Leafs
Hart Trophy: (Most valuable player)	Maurice Richard, Montreal Canadiens
Lady Byng Trophy: (Excellence and sportsmanship)	Bobby Bauer, Boston Bruins
Vezina Trophy: (Goaltender of team with lowest GAA)	Bill Durnan, Montreal Canadiens

All-Star teams
First team	Position	Second team
Bill Durnan, Montreal Canadiens	G	Frank Brimsek, Boston Bruins
Ken Reardon, Montreal Canadiens	D	Jack Stewart, Detroit Red Wings
Emile "Butch" Bouchard, Montreal Canadiens	D	Bill Quackenbush, Detroit Red Wings
Milt Schmidt, Boston Bruins	C	Max Bentley, Chicago Black Hawks
Maurice Richard, Montreal Canadiens	RW	Bobby Bauer, Boston Bruins
Doug Bentley, Chicago Black Hawks	LW	Woody Dumart, Boston Bruins

== Player statistics ==
=== Scoring leaders ===
Note: GP = Games played, G = Goals, A = Assists, PTS = Points, PIM = Penalties in minutes

Player	Team	GP	G	A	Pts	PIM
Max Bentley	Chicago Black Hawks	60	29	43	72	12
Maurice Richard	Montreal Canadiens	60	45	26	71	69
Billy Taylor	Detroit Red Wings	60	17	46	63	35
Milt Schmidt	Boston Bruins	59	27	35	62	40
Ted Kennedy	Toronto Maple Leafs	60	28	32	60	27
Doug Bentley	Chicago Black Hawks	52	21	34	55	18
Bobby Bauer	Boston Bruins	58	30	24	54	4
Roy Conacher	Detroit Red Wings	60	30	24	54	6
Bill Mosienko	Chicago Black Hawks	59	25	27	52	2
Woody Dumart	Boston Bruins	60	24	28	52	12

Source: NHL

=== Leading goaltenders ===
Note: GP = Games played; Mins – Minutes played; GA = Goals against; GAA = Goals against average; W = Wins; L = Losses; T = Ties; SO = Shutouts

Player	Team	GP	Mins	GA	GAA	W	L	T	SO
Bill Durnan	Montreal Canadiens	60	3600	138	2.30	34	16	10	4
Turk Broda	Toronto Maple Leafs	60	3600	172	2.87	31	19	10	4
Frank Brimsek	Boston Bruins	60	3600	175	2.92	26	23	11	3
Chuck Rayner	New York Rangers	58	3480	177	3.05	22	30	6	5
Harry Lumley	Detroit Red Wings	52	3120	159	3.06	22	20	10	3
Paul Bibeault	Chicago Black Hawks	41	2460	170	4.15	13	25	3	1
Emile Francis	Chicago Black Hawks	19	1140	104	5.47	6	12	1	0

== Coaches ==
- Boston Bruins: Dit Clapper
- Chicago Black Hawks: Johnny Gottselig
- Detroit Red Wings: Jack Adams
- Montreal Canadiens: Dick Irvin
- New York Rangers: Frank Boucher
- Toronto Maple Leafs: Hap Day

== Debuts ==
The following is a list of players of note who played their first NHL game in 1946–47 (listed with their first team, asterisk(*) marks debut in playoffs):

- Johnny Peirson, Boston Bruins
- Pentti Lund*, Boston Bruins
- Bill Gadsby, Chicago Black Hawks
- Gordie Howe, Detroit Red Wings
- Jim McFadden*, Detroit Red Wings
- Bill Barilko, Toronto Maple Leafs
- Garth Boesch, Toronto Maple Leafs
- Gus Mortson, Toronto Maple Leafs
- Howie Meeker, Toronto Maple Leafs
- Sid Smith, Toronto Maple Leafs

== Last games ==
The following is a list of players of note that played their last game in the NHL in 1946–47 (listed with their last team):

- Don Grosso, Boston Bruins
- Bill Cowley, Boston Bruins (Last active St. Louis Eagles player)
- Dit Clapper, Boston Bruins
- Babe Pratt, Boston Bruins
- Clint Smith, Chicago Black Hawks
- Johnny Mowers, Chicago Black Hawks
- Joe Benoit, Montreal Canadiens

== See also ==
- 1946–47 NHL transactions
- List of Stanley Cup champions
- 1946 in sports
- 1947 in sports
