= 1948 Stanley Cup playoffs =

NHL postseason tournament

Tournament details
- Dates: March 24 – April 14, 1948
- Teams: 4
- Defending champions: Toronto Maple Leafs

Final positions
- Champions: Toronto Maple Leafs
- Runner-up: Detroit Red Wings

The 1948 Stanley Cup playoffs was the playoff tournament of the National Hockey League (NHL) for the 1947–48 season. It began on March 24, 1948. It concluded on April 14, with the Toronto Maple Leafs defeating the Detroit Red Wings to win the Stanley Cup.

== Playoff seeds ==
The top four out of the six teams in the league qualified for the playoffs:

1. Toronto Maple Leafs – 77 points
2. Detroit Red Wings – 72 points
3. Boston Bruins – 59 points
4. New York Rangers – 55 points

== Playoff bracket ==
In each round, teams competed in a best-of-seven series (scores in the bracket indicate the number of games won in each best-of-seven series). In the semifinals, the first-place team played the third-place team, while the second-place team played the fourth-place team. The winners of the semifinals then played for the Stanley Cup.

Semifinals
1	Toronto	4
3	Boston	1
2	Detroit	4
4	New York	2

Stanley Cup Finals
1	Toronto	4
2	Detroit	0

== Semifinals ==
=== (1) Toronto Maple Leafs vs. (3) Boston Bruins ===
Toronto beat Boston 4 games to 1. Although Boston kept it close. Three of the five games were decided by one goal.

March 24	Boston Bruins	4-5	OT	Toronto Maple Leafs	Maple Leaf Gardens	Recap
Murray Henderson (1) - 1:18		First period		11:29 - Bill Ezinicki (1)
Ed Harrison (1) - 8:39		Second period		17:33 - Max Bentley (1)
Pat Egan (1) - 2:35; Ken Smith (1) - 8:38		Third period		12:03 - Syl Apps (1); 15:34 - Jimmy Thomson (1)
No scoring		First overtime period		17:03 - Nick Metz (1)
Frank Brimsek		Goalie stats		Turk Broda

March 27	Boston Bruins	3-5	Toronto Maple Leafs	Maple Leaf Gardens	Recap
Johnny Peirson (1) - pp - 8:39		First period	5:41 - Ted Kennedy (1); 19:54 - pp - Ted Kennedy (2)
Pete Babando (1) - pp - 2:16		Second period	6:34 - Ted Kennedy (3); 12:24 - Ted Kennedy (4)
Milt Schmidt (1) - 10:43		Third period	7:37 - Max Bentley (2)
Frank Brimsek		Goalie stats	Turk Broda

March 30	Toronto Maple Leafs	5-1	Boston Bruins	Boston Garden	Recap
Howie Meeker (1) - 3:40; Bill Barilko (1) - 12:28		First period	No scoring
Ted Kennedy (5) - 9:24		Second period	1:10 - Milt Schmidt (2)
Garth Boesch (1) - 7:00; Nick Metz (2) - 17:49		Third period	No scoring
Turk Broda		Goalie stats	Frank Brimsek

April 1	Toronto Maple Leafs	2-3	Boston Bruins	Boston Garden	Recap
No scoring		First period	2:47 - Ed Sandford (1)
Bill Ezinicki (2) - 1:36		Second period	7:31 - Johnny Peirson (2)
Syl Apps (2) - 15:08		Third period	13:24 - Johnny Peirson (3)
Turk Broda		Goalie stats	Frank Brimsek

April 3	Boston Bruins	2-3	Toronto Maple Leafs	Maple Leaf Gardens	Recap
Jimmy Peters (1) - pp - 5:20		First period	8:41 - Vic Lynn (1); 16:13 - Les Costello (1)
Ken Smith (2) - 12:08		Second period	No scoring
No scoring		Third period	5:52 - Ted Kennedy (6)
Frank Brimsek		Goalie stats	Turk Broda

Toronto won series 4–1

=== (2) Detroit Red Wings vs. (4) New York Rangers ===
It looked initially to be a close series as, after the Blueshirts lost the first two games, the Wings Production line got lazy. But wingers, Ted Lindsay and Gordie Howe chose follow Lindsay's recent quote:

In this game, you have to be mean, or you're going to get pushed around.

March 24	New York Rangers	1-2	Detroit Red Wings	Olympia Stadium	Recap
No scoring		First period	15:04 - Ted Lindsay (1); 19:06 - pp - Jim Conacher (1)
No scoring		Second period	No scoring
Tony Leswick (1) - 3:35		Third period	No scoring
Chuck Rayner		Goalie stats	Harry Lumley

March 26	New York Rangers	2-5	Detroit Red Wings	Olympia Stadium	Recap
Edgar Laprade (1) - 14:53		First period	4:00 - Jim McFadden (1)
No scoring		Second period	4:57 - Jim McFadden (2); 8:18 - pp - Marty Pavelich (1)
Neil Colville (1) - 10:51		Third period	10:04 - Leo Reise (1); 14:49 - Marty Pavelich (2)
Chuck Rayner		Goalie stats	Harry Lumley

March 28	Detroit Red Wings	2-3	New York Rangers	Madison Square Garden III	Recap
No scoring		First period	3:32 - Phil Watson (1); 10:35 - Phil Watson (2)
Ted Lindsay (2) - 19:40		Second period	No scoring
Jack Stewart (1) - 16:03		Third period	9:02 - Tony Leswick (2)
Harry Lumley		Goalie stats	Chuck Rayner

March 30	Detroit Red Wings	1-3	New York Rangers	Madison Square Garden III	Recap
Jim McFadden (3) - 3:41		First period	No scoring
No scoring		Second period	10:08 - pp - Bryan Hextall (1); 10:41 - Eddie Kullman (1)
No scoring		Third period	13:32 - Tony Leswick (3)
Harry Lumley		Goalie stats	Chuck Rayner

April 1	New York Rangers	1-3	Detroit Red Wings	Olympia Stadium	Recap
No scoring		First period	4:02 - pp - Red Kelly (1)
No scoring		Second period	14:13 - pp - Pete Horeck (1)
Buddy O'Connor (1) - 12:49		Third period	13:55 - Red Kelly (2)
Chuck Rayner		Goalie stats	Harry Lumley

April 4	Detroit Red Wings	4-2	New York Rangers	Madison Square Garden III	Recap
Red Kelly (3) - pp - 13:46; Gordie Howe (1) - pp - 14:30; Pat Lundy (1) - 17:51		First period	No scoring
No scoring		Second period	No scoring
Jim McFadden (4) - 10:49		Third period	12:49 - Don Raleigh (1); 19:08 - Don Raleigh (2)
Harry Lumley		Goalie stats	Chuck Rayner

Detroit won series 4–2

== Finals ==
Detroit appeared in the Stanley Cup Finals for the fourth time in six years, while Toronto was trying to repeat as Cup champpions.

April 7	Detroit Red Wings	3-5	Toronto Maple Leafs	Maple Leaf Gardens	Recap
Jim McFadden (5) - 7:20		First period	8:21 - Harry Watson (1); 9:04 - Joe Klukay (1); 18:24 - Syl Apps (3)
No scoring		Second period	14:31 - Gus Mortson (1); 19:21 - Howie Meeker (2)
Jim Conacher (2) - 4:28; Ted Lindsay (3) - 5:25		Third period	No scoring
Harry Lumley		Goalie stats	Turk Broda

April 10	Detroit Red Wings	2-4	Toronto Maple Leafs	Maple Leaf Gardens	Recap
No scoring		First period	13:31 - Max Bentley (3)
Pete Horeck (2) - 18:18		Second period	3:38 - pp - Bill Ezinicki (3); 17:16 - pp - Max Bentley (4); 18:50 - Harry Watson (2)
Fern Gauthier (1) - pp - 17:18		Third period	No scoring
Harry Lumley		Goalie stats	Turk Broda

April 11	Toronto Maple Leafs	2-0	Detroit Red Wings	Olympia Stadium	Recap
No scoring		First period	No scoring
Harry Watson (3) - 19:42		Second period	No scoring
Vic Lynn (2) - 15:16		Third period	No scoring
Turk Broda		Goalie stats	Harry Lumley

April 14	Toronto Maple Leafs	7-2	Detroit Red Wings	Olympia Stadium	Recap
Ted Kennedy (7) - pp - 2:51; Garth Boesch (2) - sh - 5:03; Harry Watson (4) - 11:13		First period	No scoring
Syl Apps (4) - 4:26; Ted Kennedy (8) - 9:42; Harry Watson (5) - sh - 11:38		Second period	2:41 - Leo Reise (2)
Les Costello (2) - pp - 14:37		Third period	18:48 - Pete Horeck (3)
Turk Broda		Goalie stats	Harry Lumley

Toronto won series 4–0

== Scoring leaders ==
GP = Games Played, G = Goals, A = Assists, Pts = Points

Player	Team	GP	G	A	Pts
Ted Kennedy	Toronto Maple Leafs	9	8	6	14
Max Bentley	Toronto Maple Leafs	9	4	7	11
Pete Horeck	Detroit Red Wings	10	3	7	10
Jim McFadden	Detroit Red Wings	10	5	3	8
Syl Apps	Toronto Maple Leafs	9	4	4	8
Harry Watson	Toronto Maple Leafs	9	5	2	7
Milt Schmidt	Boston Bruins	5	2	5	7

== See also ==
- 1947–48 NHL season
- List of Stanley Cup champions

Preceded by 1947 Stanley Cup playoffs	Stanley Cup playoffs	Succeeded by 1949 Stanley Cup playoffs
