= 1947–48 Detroit Red Wings season =

National Hockey League team season

1947–48 Detroit Red Wings
- League: 2nd NHL
- 1947–48 record: 30–18–12
- Home record: 16–9–5
- Road record: 14–9–7
- Goals for: 187
- Goals against: 148

Team information
- General manager: Jack Adams
- Coach: Tommy Ivan
- Captain: Sid Abel
- Arena: Detroit Olympia

Team leaders
- Goals: Ted Lindsay (33)
- Assists: Sid Abel (30)
- Points: Ted Lindsay (52)
- Penalty minutes: Jack Stewart (91)
- Wins: Harry Lumley (30)
- Goals against average: Harry Lumley (2.46)

The 1947–48 Detroit Red Wings season was the Red Wings' 22nd season.

== Regular season ==
=== Final standings ===
National Hockey League
		GP	W	L	T	GF	GA	DIFF	Pts
1	Toronto Maple Leafs	60	32	15	13	182	143	+39	77
2	Detroit Red Wings	60	30	18	12	187	148	+39	72
3	Boston Bruins	60	23	24	13	167	168	−1	59
4	New York Rangers	60	21	26	13	176	201	−25	55
5	Montreal Canadiens	60	20	29	11	147	169	−22	51
6	Chicago Black Hawks	60	20	34	6	195	225	−30	46

=== Record vs. opponents ===
1947–48 NHL Records
Team	BOS	CHI	DET	MTL	NYR	TOR
Boston	—	3–7–2	4–6–2	6–2–4	7–3–2	3–7–2
Chicago	7–3–2	—	2–10	4–7–1	6–4–2	1–10–1
Detroit	6–4–2	10–2	—	7–2–3	5–4–3	2–6–4
Montreal	2–6–4	7–4–1	2–7–3	—	3–7–2	6–5–1
New York	3–7–2	4–6–2	4–5–3	7–3–2	—	3–5–4
Toronto	7–3–2	10–1–1	6–2–4	5–6–1	5–3–4	—

== Schedule and results ==
1947–48 regular season
October

Game	Result	Date	Score	Opponent	Record
1	W	October 15, 1947	4–2	Chicago Black Hawks (1947–48)	1–0–0
2	T	October 18, 1947	2–2	@ Toronto Maple Leafs (1947–48)	1–0–1
3	W	October 19, 1947	2–0	Toronto Maple Leafs (1947–48)	2–0–1
4	L	October 26, 1947	2–4	Montreal Canadiens (1947–48)	2–1–1
5	W	October 29, 1947	5–2	@ Chicago Black Hawks (1947–48)	3–1–1

November

Game	Result	Date	Score	Opponent	Record
6	L	November 1, 1947	3–4	@ New York Rangers (1947–48)	3–2–1
7	W	November 2, 1947	3–2	Boston Bruins (1947–48)	4–2–1
8	W	November 6, 1947	2–1	New York Rangers (1947–48)	5–2–1
9	W	November 8, 1947	3–1	@ Montreal Canadiens (1947–48)	6–2–1
10	L	November 9, 1947	0–6	Toronto Maple Leafs (1947–48)	6–3–1
11	L	November 15, 1947	3–5	@ Toronto Maple Leafs (1947–48)	6–4–1
12	W	November 16, 1947	2–1	@ Boston Bruins (1947–48)	7–4–1
13	L	November 19, 1947	5–6	New York Rangers (1947–48)	7–5–1
14	W	November 22, 1947	8–5	Chicago Black Hawks (1947–48)	8–5–1
15	W	November 23, 1947	9–3	@ Chicago Black Hawks (1947–48)	9–5–1
16	W	November 27, 1947	4–1	Boston Bruins (1947–48)	10–5–1
17	T	November 30, 1947	1–1	Montreal Canadiens (1947–48)	10–5–2

December

Game	Result	Date	Score	Opponent	Record
18	L	December 6, 1947	0–4	@ Montreal Canadiens (1947–48)	10–6–2
19	L	December 7, 1947	1–3	@ New York Rangers (1947–48)	10–7–2
20	T	December 10, 1947	2–2	Toronto Maple Leafs (1947–48)	10–7–3
21	W	December 13, 1947	4–3	Chicago Black Hawks (1947–48)	11–7–3
22	T	December 14, 1947	1–1	@ New York Rangers (1947–48)	11–7–4
23	W	December 17, 1947	7–1	@ Chicago Black Hawks (1947–48)	12–7–4
24	T	December 20, 1947	4–4	@ Toronto Maple Leafs (1947–48)	12–7–5
25	W	December 21, 1947	6–5	@ Boston Bruins (1947–48)	13–7–5
26	L	December 25, 1947	0–2	New York Rangers (1947–48)	13–8–5
27	W	December 28, 1947	3–0	Boston Bruins (1947–48)	14–8–5
28	W	December 31, 1947	4–0	Chicago Black Hawks (1947–48)	15–8–5

January

Game	Result	Date	Score	Opponent	Record
29	W	January 1, 1948	4–1	@ Chicago Black Hawks (1947–48)	16–8–5
30	W	January 4, 1948	6–2	Montreal Canadiens (1947–48)	17–8–5
31	W	January 7, 1948	6–0	New York Rangers (1947–48)	18–8–5
32	T	January 8, 1948	1–1	@ Montreal Canadiens (1947–48)	18–8–6
33	L	January 10, 1948	1–4	Boston Bruins (1947–48)	18–9–6
34	T	January 11, 1948	2–2	Toronto Maple Leafs (1947–48)	18–9–7
35	T	January 14, 1948	3–3	@ Boston Bruins (1947–48)	18–9–8
36	L	January 18, 1948	4–5	Chicago Black Hawks (1947–48)	18–10–8
37	W	January 21, 1948	4–3	@ New York Rangers (1947–48)	19–10–8
38	W	January 24, 1948	5–1	@ Montreal Canadiens (1947–48)	20–10–8
39	W	January 25, 1948	1–0	Montreal Canadiens (1947–48)	21–10–8
40	W	January 28, 1948	4–2	@ Boston Bruins (1947–48)	22–10–8
41	L	January 31, 1948	2–3	@ Toronto Maple Leafs (1947–48)	22–11–8

February

Game	Result	Date	Score	Opponent	Record
42	W	February 1, 1948	3–0	Toronto Maple Leafs (1947–48)	23–11–8
43	W	February 3, 1948	4–1	@ Chicago Black Hawks (1947–48)	24–11–8
44	T	February 4, 1948	4–4	New York Rangers (1947–48)	24–11–9
45	W	February 7, 1948	5–3	@ Montreal Canadiens (1947–48)	25–11–9
46	L	February 8, 1948	1–3	Boston Bruins (1947–48)	25–12–9
47	L	February 15, 1948	1–3	@ Boston Bruins (1947–48)	25–13–9
48	W	February 18, 1948	3–1	@ New York Rangers (1947–48)	26–13–9
49	L	February 21, 1948	2–3	@ Toronto Maple Leafs (1947–48)	26–14–9
50	W	February 22, 1948	4–3	Montreal Canadiens (1947–48)	27–14–9
51	W	February 28, 1948	5–2	@ Montreal Canadiens (1947–48)	28–14–9

March

Game	Result	Date	Score	Opponent	Record
52	W	March 3, 1948	4–2	New York Rangers (1947–48)	29–14–9
53	T	March 6, 1948	2–2	Montreal Canadiens (1947–48)	29–14–10
54	T	March 7, 1948	2–2	@ New York Rangers (1947–48)	29–14–11
55	L	March 9, 1948	1–4	@ Chicago Black Hawks (1947–48)	29–15–11
56	W	March 10, 1948	7–2	Chicago Black Hawks (1947–48)	30–15–11
57	L	March 14, 1948	1–5	Boston Bruins (1947–48)	30–16–11
58	T	March 17, 1948	0–0	@ Boston Bruins (1947–48)	30–16–12
59	L	March 20, 1948	3–5	@ Toronto Maple Leafs (1947–48)	30–17–12
60	L	March 21, 1948	2–5	Toronto Maple Leafs (1947–48)	30–18–12

Legend: Win (2 points) Loss (0 points) Tie (1 point)

== Playoffs ==
=== (2) Detroit Red Wings vs. (4) New York Rangers ===
It looked initially to be a close series as, after the Blueshirts lost the first two games, the Rangers won the next two to tie the series. Detroit then took the next two to win the series in six games to qualify for the Finals.

March 24	New York Rangers	1–2	Detroit Red Wings	Olympia Stadium	Recap
No scoring		First period	15:04 – Ted Lindsay (1); 19:06 – pp – Jim Conacher (1)
No scoring		Second period	No scoring
Tony Leswick (1) – 03:35		Third period	No scoring
Chuck Rayner		Goalie stats	Harry Lumley

March 26	New York Rangers	2–5	Detroit Red Wings	Olympia Stadium	Recap
Edgar Laprade (1) – 14:53		First period	04:00 – Jim McFadden (1)
No scoring		Second period	04:57 – Jim McFadden (2); 08:18 – pp – Marty Pavelich (1)
Neil Colville (1) – 10:51		Third period	10:04 – Leo Reise (1); 14:49 – Marty Pavelich (2)
Chuck Rayner		Goalie stats	Harry Lumley

March 28	Detroit Red Wings	2–3	New York Rangers	Madison Square Garden III	Recap
No scoring		First period	03:32 – Phil Watson (1); 10:35 – Phil Watson (2)
Ted Lindsay (2) – 19:40		Second period	No scoring
Jack Stewart (1) – 16:03		Third period	09:02 – Tony Leswick (2)
Harry Lumley		Goalie stats	Chuck Rayner

March 30	Detroit Red Wings	1–3	New York Rangers	Madison Square Garden III	Recap
Jim McFadden (3) – 03:41		First period	No scoring
No scoring		Second period	10:08 – pp – Bryan Hextall (1); 10:41 – Eddie Kullman (1)
No scoring		Third period	13:32 – Tony Leswick (3)
Harry Lumley		Goalie stats	Chuck Rayner

April 1	New York Rangers	1–3	Detroit Red Wings	Olympia Stadium	Recap
No scoring		First period	04:02 – pp – Red Kelly (1)
No scoring		Second period	14:13 – pp – Pete Horeck (1)
Buddy O'Connor (1) – 12:49		Third period	13:55 – Red Kelly (2)
Chuck Rayner		Goalie stats	Harry Lumley

April 4	Detroit Red Wings	4–2	New York Rangers	Madison Square Garden III	Recap
Red Kelly (3) – pp – 13:46; Gordie Howe (1) – pp – 14:30; Pat Lundy (1) – 17:51		First period	No scoring
No scoring		Second period	No scoring
Jim McFadden (4) – 10:49		Third period	12:49 – Don Raleigh (1); 19:08 – Don Raleigh (2)
Harry Lumley		Goalie stats	Chuck Rayner

Detroit won series 4–2

=== Stanley Cup Finals ===
April 7	Detroit Red Wings	3–5	Toronto Maple Leafs	Maple Leaf Gardens	Recap
Jim McFadden (5) – 07:20		First period	08:21 – Harry Watson (1); 09:04 – Joe Klukay (1); 18:24 – Syl Apps (3)
No scoring		Second period	14:31 – Gus Mortson (1); 19:21 – Howie Meeker (2)
Jim Conacher (2) – 04:28; Ted Lindsay (3) – 05:25		Third period	No scoring
Harry Lumley		Goalie stats	Turk Broda

April 10	Detroit Red Wings	2–4	Toronto Maple Leafs	Maple Leaf Gardens	Recap
No scoring		First period	13:31 – Max Bentley (3)
Pete Horeck (2) – 18:18		Second period	03:38 – pp – Bill Ezinicki (3); 17:16 – pp – Max Bentley (4); 18:50 – Harry Watson (2)
Fern Gauthier (1) – pp – 17:18		Third period	No scoring
Harry Lumley		Goalie stats	Turk Broda

April 11	Toronto Maple Leafs	2–0	Detroit Red Wings	Olympia Stadium	Recap
No scoring		First period	No scoring
Harry Watson (3) – 19:42		Second period	No scoring
Vic Lynn (2) – 15:16		Third period	No scoring
Turk Broda		Goalie stats	Harry Lumley

April 14	Toronto Maple Leafs	7–2	Detroit Red Wings	Olympia Stadium	Recap
Ted Kennedy (7) – pp – 02:51; Garth Boesch (2) – sh – 05:03; Harry Watson (4) – 11:13		First period	No scoring
Syl Apps (4) – 04:26; Ted Kennedy (8) – 09:42; Harry Watson (5) – sh – 11:38		Second period	02:41 – Leo Reise (2)
Les Costello (2) – pp – 14:37		Third period	18:48 – Pete Horeck (3)
Turk Broda		Goalie stats	Harry Lumley

Toronto won series 4–0

== Player statistics ==
=== Regular season ===
Scoring

Player	Pos	GP	G	A	Pts	PIM
Ted Lindsay	LW	60	33	19	52	95
Jim McFadden	C	60	24	24	48	12
Gordie Howe	RW	60	16	28	44	63
Sid Abel	C/LW	60	14	30	44	69
Jim Conacher	C	60	17	23	40	2
Pete Horeck	LW	50	12	17	29	44
Don Morrison	C	40	10	15	25	6
Bep Guidolin	LW	58	12	10	22	78
Bill Quackenbush	D	58	6	16	22	17
Red Kelly	D/C	60	6	14	20	13
Jack Stewart	D	60	5	14	19	91
Rod Morrison	RW	34	8	7	15	4
Marty Pavelich	LW	41	4	8	12	10
Leo Reise	D	58	5	4	9	30
Gerry Couture	RW	19	3	6	9	2
Doug McCaig	D	29	3	3	6	37
Fern Gauthier	RW	35	1	5	6	2
Pat Lundy	C	11	4	1	5	6
Max McNab	C	12	2	2	4	2
Eddie Bruneteau	RW	18	1	1	2	2
Enio Sclisizzi	LW	4	1	0	1	0
Harry Lumley	G	60	0	0	0	8
Tom McGrattan	G	1	0	0	0	0
Ed Nicholson	D	1	0	0	0	0
Barry Sullivan	RW	1	0	0	0	0

Goaltending

Player	MIN	GP	W	L	T	GA	GAA	SO
Harry Lumley	3592	60	30	18	12	147	2.46	7
Tom McGrattan	8	1	0	0	0	1	7.50	0
Team:	3600	60	30	18	12	148	2.47	7

=== Playoffs ===
Scoring

Player	Pos	GP	G	A	Pts	PIM
Pete Horeck	LW	10	3	7	10	12
Jim McFadden	C	10	5	3	8	10
Red Kelly	D/C	10	3	2	5	2
Ted Lindsay	LW	10	3	1	4	6
Marty Pavelich	LW	10	2	2	4	6
Jack Stewart	D	9	1	3	4	6
Leo Reise	D	10	2	1	3	12
Sid Abel	C/LW	10	0	3	3	16
Jim Conacher	C	9	2	0	2	2
Fern Gauthier	RW	10	1	1	2	5
Gordie Howe	RW	10	1	1	2	11
Pat Lundy	C	5	1	1	2	0
Bill Quackenbush	D	10	0	2	2	0
Lee Fogolin	D	2	0	1	1	6
Don Morrison	C	3	0	1	1	0
Eddie Bruneteau	RW	6	0	0	0	0
Al Dewsbury	D	1	0	0	0	0
Bep Guidolin	LW	2	0	0	0	4
Harry Lumley	G	10	0	0	0	10
Max McNab	C	3	0	0	0	2
Rod Morrison	RW	3	0	0	0	0
Enio Sclisizzi	LW	6	0	0	0	4
Cliff Simpson	C	1	0	0	0	2

Goaltending

Player	MIN	GP	W	L	GA	GAA	SO
Harry Lumley	600	10	4	6	30	3.00	0
Team:	600	10	4	6	30	3.00	0

Note: GP = Games played; G = Goals; A = Assists; Pts = Points; +/- = Plus-minus PIM = Penalty minutes; PPG = Power-play goals; SHG = Short-handed goals; GWG = Game-winning goals;
MIN = Minutes played; W = Wins; L = Losses; T = Ties; GA = Goals against; GAA = Goals-against average; SO = Shutouts;

== See also ==
- 1947–48 NHL season
