= 1947–48 Toronto Maple Leafs season =

NHL hockey team season (won Stanley Cup)

1947–48 Toronto Maple Leafs
- Stanley Cup champions
- Prince of Wales Trophy winners
- League: 1st NHL
- 1947–48 record: 32–15–13
- Home record: 22–3–5
- Road record: 10–12–8
- Goals for: 182
- Goals against: 143

Team information
- General manager: Conn Smythe
- Coach: Hap Day
- Captain: Syl Apps
- Arena: Maple Leaf Gardens

Team leaders
- Goals: Syl Apps (26)
- Assists: Syl Apps (27)
- Points: Syl Apps (53)
- Penalty minutes: Bill Barilko (147)
- Wins: Turk Broda (32)
- Goals against average: Turk Broda (2.38)

The 1947–48 Toronto Maple Leafs season resulted in the team winning a second consecutive Stanley Cup.

== Regular season ==
=== Final standings ===
National Hockey League
| | | GP | W | L | T | GF | GA | DIFF | Pts |
|---|---|---|---|---|---|---|---|---|---|
| 1 | Toronto Maple Leafs | 60 | 32 | 15 | 13 | 182 | 143 | +39 | 77 |
| 2 | Detroit Red Wings | 60 | 30 | 18 | 12 | 187 | 148 | +39 | 72 |
| 3 | Boston Bruins | 60 | 23 | 24 | 13 | 167 | 168 | −1 | 59 |
| 4 | New York Rangers | 60 | 21 | 26 | 13 | 176 | 201 | −25 | 55 |
| 5 | Montreal Canadiens | 60 | 20 | 29 | 11 | 147 | 169 | −22 | 51 |
| 6 | Chicago Black Hawks | 60 | 20 | 34 | 6 | 195 | 225 | −30 | 46 |

=== Record vs. opponents ===
1947–48 NHL Records
| Team | BOS | CHI | DET | MTL | NYR | TOR |
|---|---|---|---|---|---|---|
| Boston | — | 3–7–2 | 4–6–2 | 6–2–4 | 7–3–2 | 3–7–2 |
| Chicago | 7–3–2 | — | 2–10 | 4–7–1 | 6–4–2 | 1–10–1 |
| Detroit | 6–4–2 | 10–2 | — | 7–2–3 | 5–4–3 | 2–6–4 |
| Montreal | 2–6–4 | 7–4–1 | 2–7–3 | — | 3–7–2 | 6–5–1 |
| New York | 3–7–2 | 4–6–2 | 4–5–3 | 7–3–2 | — | 3–5–4 |
| Toronto | 7–3–2 | 10–1–1 | 6–2–4 | 5–6–1 | 5–3–4 | — |

== Schedule and results ==
1947–48 regular season
October

| Game | Result | Date | Score | Opponent | Record |
|---|---|---|---|---|---|
| 1 | T | October 18 | 2–2 | Detroit Red Wings (1947–48) | 0–0–1 |
| 2 | L | October 19 | 0–2 | @ Detroit Red Wings (1947–48) | 0–1–1 |
| 3 | W | October 22 | 3–1 | New York Rangers (1947–48) | 1–1–1 |
| 4 | W | October 25 | 5–1 | Chicago Black Hawks (1947–48) | 2–1–1 |
| 5 | W | October 29 | 3–1 | Montreal Canadiens (1947–48) | 3–1–1 |

November

| Game | Result | Date | Score | Opponent | Record |
|---|---|---|---|---|---|
| 6 | T | November 1 | 1–1 | Boston Bruins (1947–48) | 3–1–2 |
| 7 | L | November 2 | 4–7 | @ New York Rangers (1947–48) | 3–2–2 |
| 8 | L | November 6 | 0–3 | @ Montreal Canadiens (1947–48) | 3–3–2 |
| 9 | W | November 8 | 7–2 | New York Rangers (1947–48) | 4–3–2 |
| 10 | W | November 9 | 6–0 | @ Detroit Red Wings (1947–48) | 5–3–2 |
| 11 | L | November 12 | 4–5 | Chicago Black Hawks (1947–48) | 5–4–2 |
| 12 | W | November 15 | 5–3 | Detroit Red Wings (1947–48) | 6–4–2 |
| 13 | W | November 16 | 5–4 | @ Chicago Black Hawks (1947–48) | 7–4–2 |
| 14 | L | November 19 | 2–7 | @ Boston Bruins (1947–48) | 7–5–2 |
| 15 | W | November 22 | 4–3 | Boston Bruins (1947–48) | 8–5–2 |
| 16 | L | November 27 | 0–2 | @ Montreal Canadiens (1947–48) | 8–6–2 |
| 17 | W | November 29 | 3–1 | Montreal Canadiens (1947–48) | 9–6–2 |
| 18 | T | November 30 | 0–0 | @ Boston Bruins (1947–48) | 9–6–3 |

December

| Game | Result | Date | Score | Opponent | Record |
|---|---|---|---|---|---|
| 19 | W | December 3 | 4–1 | @ New York Rangers (1947–48) | 10–6–3 |
| 20 | W | December 6 | 12–5 | Chicago Black Hawks (1947–48) | 11–6–3 |
| 21 | W | December 7 | 3–2 | @ Chicago Black Hawks (1947–48) | 12–6–3 |
| 22 | T | December 10 | 2–2 | @ Detroit Red Wings (1947–48) | 12–6–4 |
| 23 | L | December 13 | 1–4 | New York Rangers (1947–48) | 12–7–4 |
| 24 | T | December 14 | 1–1 | @ Boston Bruins (1947–48) | 12–7–5 |
| 25 | T | December 20 | 4–4 | Detroit Red Wings (1947–48) | 12–7–6 |
| 26 | W | December 21 | 3–1 | @ Chicago Black Hawks (1947–48) | 13–7–6 |
| 27 | W | December 25 | 3–0 | @ Montreal Canadiens (1947–48) | 14–7–6 |
| 28 | W | December 27 | 2–1 | Boston Bruins (1947–48) | 15–7–6 |
| 29 | T | December 28 | 1–1 | @ New York Rangers (1947–48) | 15–7–7 |

January

| Game | Result | Date | Score | Opponent | Record |
|---|---|---|---|---|---|
| 30 | W | January 1 | 2–1 | Montreal Canadiens (1947–48) | 16–7–7 |
| 31 | T | January 3 | 5–5 | New York Rangers (1947–48) | 16–7–8 |
| 32 | W | January 10 | 6–4 | Chicago Black Hawks (1947–48) | 17–7–8 |
| 33 | T | January 11 | 2–2 | @ Detroit Red Wings (1947–48) | 17–7–9 |
| 34 | L | January 15 | 4–8 | @ Montreal Canadiens (1947–48) | 17–8–9 |
| 35 | W | January 17 | 4–1 | Boston Bruins (1947–48) | 18–8–9 |
| 36 | T | January 18 | 2–2 | @ New York Rangers (1947–48) | 18–8–10 |
| 37 | L | January 21 | 1–2 | @ Boston Bruins (1947–48) | 18–9–10 |
| 38 | W | January 24 | 2–1 | Chicago Black Hawks (1947–48) | 19–9–10 |
| 39 | T | January 25 | 4–4 | @ Chicago Black Hawks (1947–48) | 19–9–11 |
| 40 | T | January 28 | 3–3 | Montreal Canadiens (1947–48) | 19–9–12 |
| 41 | W | January 31 | 3–2 | Detroit Red Wings (1947–48) | 20–9–12 |

February

| Game | Result | Date | Score | Opponent | Record |
|---|---|---|---|---|---|
| 42 | L | February 1 | 0–3 | @ Detroit Red Wings (1947–48) | 20–10–12 |
| 43 | W | February 4 | 4–2 | @ Boston Bruins (1947–48) | 21–10–12 |
| 44 | W | February 7 | 3–0 | New York Rangers (1947–48) | 22–10–12 |
| 45 | W | February 14 | 4–2 | Montreal Canadiens (1947–48) | 23–10–12 |
| 46 | T | February 15 | 4–4 | @ New York Rangers (1947–48) | 23–10–13 |
| 47 | L | February 19 | 1–3 | @ Montreal Canadiens (1947–48) | 23–11–13 |
| 48 | W | February 21 | 3–2 | Detroit Red Wings (1947–48) | 24–11–13 |
| 49 | W | February 22 | 3–2 | @ Chicago Black Hawks (1947–48) | 25–11–13 |
| 50 | W | February 25 | 4–2 | Boston Bruins (1947–48) | 26–11–13 |
| 51 | W | February 28 | 4–3 | Chicago Black Hawks (1947–48) | 27–11–13 |

March

| Game | Result | Date | Score | Opponent | Record |
|---|---|---|---|---|---|
| 52 | L | March 2 | 0–1 | @ New York Rangers (1947–48) | 27–12–13 |
| 53 | L | March 3 | 2–3 | Montreal Canadiens (1947–48) | 27–13–13 |
| 54 | W | March 6 | 2–1 | New York Rangers (1947–48) | 28–13–13 |
| 55 | L | March 7 | 1–3 | @ Boston Bruins (1947–48) | 28–14–13 |
| 56 | L | March 11 | 1–3 | @ Montreal Canadiens (1947–48) | 28–15–13 |
| 57 | W | March 13 | 5–2 | Boston Bruins (1947–48) | 29–15–13 |
| 58 | W | March 14 | 3–0 | @ Chicago Black Hawks (1947–48) | 30–15–13 |
| 59 | W | March 20 | 5–3 | Detroit Red Wings (1947–48) | 31–15–13 |
| 60 | W | March 21 | 5–2 | @ Detroit Red Wings (1947–48) | 32–15–13 |

Legend: Win (2 points) Loss (0 points) Tie (1 point)

== Player statistics ==
=== Regular season ===
Scoring

| Player | GP | G | A | Pts | PIM |
|---|---|---|---|---|---|
| Syl Apps | 55 | 26 | 27 | 53 | 12 |
| Max Bentley | 53 | 23 | 25 | 48 | 10 |
| Ted Kennedy | 60 | 25 | 21 | 46 | 32 |
| Harry Watson | 57 | 21 | 20 | 41 | 16 |
| Howie Meeker | 58 | 14 | 20 | 34 | 62 |
| Vic Lynn | 60 | 12 | 22 | 34 | 53 |
| Bill Ezinicki | 60 | 11 | 20 | 31 | 97 |
| Joe Klukay | 59 | 15 | 15 | 30 | 28 |
| Jimmy Thomson | 59 | 0 | 29 | 29 | 82 |
| Gus Mortson | 58 | 7 | 11 | 18 | 118 |
| Sid Smith | 31 | 7 | 10 | 17 | 10 |
| Bill Barilko | 57 | 5 | 9 | 14 | 147 |
| Wally Stanowski | 54 | 2 | 11 | 13 | 12 |
| Nick Metz | 60 | 4 | 8 | 12 | 8 |
| Don Metz | 26 | 4 | 6 | 10 | 2 |
| Garth Boesch | 45 | 2 | 7 | 9 | 52 |
| Cy Thomas | 8 | 1 | 2 | 3 | 4 |
| Bud Poile | 4 | 2 | 0 | 2 | 0 |
| Gaye Stewart | 7 | 1 | 0 | 1 | 0 |
| John McCormack | 3 | 0 | 1 | 1 | 0 |
| Turk Broda | 60 | 0 | 0 | 0 | 2 |
| Fleming MacKell | 3 | 0 | 0 | 0 | 2 |
| Tod Sloan | 1 | 0 | 0 | 0 | 0 |

Goaltending

| Player | MIN | GP | W | L | T | GA | GAA | SA | SV | SV% | SO |
|---|---|---|---|---|---|---|---|---|---|---|---|
| Turk Broda | 3600 | 60 | 32 | 15 | 13 | 143 | 2.38 | | | | 5 |
| Team: | 3600 | 60 | 32 | 15 | 13 | 143 | 2.38 | | | | 5 |

=== Playoffs ===
Scoring

| Player | GP | G | A | Pts | PIM |
|---|---|---|---|---|---|
| Ted Kennedy | 9 | 8 | 6 | 14 | 0 |
| Max Bentley | 9 | 4 | 7 | 11 | 0 |
| Syl Apps | 9 | 4 | 4 | 8 | 0 |
| Harry Watson | 9 | 5 | 2 | 7 | 9 |
| Vic Lynn | 9 | 2 | 5 | 7 | 20 |
| Howie Meeker | 9 | 2 | 4 | 6 | 15 |
| Bill Ezinicki | 9 | 3 | 1 | 4 | 6 |
| Les Costello | 5 | 2 | 2 | 4 | 2 |
| Garth Boesch | 8 | 2 | 1 | 3 | 2 |
| Gus Mortson | 5 | 1 | 2 | 3 | 2 |
| Nick Metz | 9 | 2 | 0 | 2 | 2 |
| Joe Klukay | 9 | 1 | 1 | 2 | 2 |
| Jimmy Thomson | 9 | 1 | 1 | 2 | 9 |
| Wally Stanowski | 9 | 0 | 2 | 2 | 2 |
| Bill Barilko | 9 | 1 | 0 | 1 | 17 |
| Phil Samis | 5 | 0 | 1 | 1 | 2 |
| Turk Broda | 9 | 0 | 0 | 0 | 10 |
| Don Metz | 2 | 0 | 0 | 0 | 2 |
| Sid Smith | 2 | 0 | 0 | 0 | 0 |

Goaltending

| Player | MIN | GP | W | L | T | GA | GAA | SA | SV | SV% | SO |
|---|---|---|---|---|---|---|---|---|---|---|---|
| Turk Broda | 557 | 9 | 8 | 1 | | 20 | 2.15 | | | | 1 |
| Team: | 557 | 9 | 8 | 1 | | 20 | 2.15 | | | | 1 |

== Playoffs ==
=== Stanley Cup Finals ===
This was the debut series for Detroit's Gordie Howe, and the last for Toronto's Syl Apps who retired after the series.

Detroit Red Wings vs. Toronto Maple Leafs

| Date | Away | Score | Home | Score | Notes |
|---|---|---|---|---|---|
| April 7 | Detroit | 3 | Toronto | 5 | |
| April 10 | Detroit | 2 | Toronto | 4 | |
| April 11 | Toronto | 2 | Detroit | 0 | |
| April 14 | Toronto | 7 | Detroit | 2 | |

Toronto wins best-of-seven series 4–0.

== Awards and records ==
- Prince of Wales Trophy
- Vezina Trophy: || Turk Broda
- Turk Broda, Goaltender, NHL First Team All-Star

== Transactions ==
- May 15, 1947: Traded Buck Jones and Nick Knott to the Tulsa Oilers of the USHL for cash
- October 5, 1947: Traded Gordie Bell to the Washington Lions of the AHL for cash
- November 2, 1947: Acquired Max Bentley and Cy Thomas from the Chicago Black Hawks for Gus Bodnar, Gaye Stewart, Bob Goldham, Bud Poile and Ernie Dickens
