= 1947–48 Chicago Black Hawks season =

NHL ice hockey team season

1947–48 Chicago Black Hawks
- League: 6th NHL
- 1947–48 record: 20–34–6
- Home record: 10–17–3
- Road record: 10–17–3
- Goals for: 195
- Goals against: 225

Team information
- General manager: Bill Tobin
- Coach: Johnny Gottselig (7–19–2); Charlie Conacher (13–15–4)
- Captain: John Mariucci
- Arena: Chicago Stadium

Team leaders
- Goals: Gaye Stewart (26)
- Assists: Doug Bentley (37)
- Points: Doug Bentley (57)
- Penalty minutes: Ralph Nattrass (79)
- Wins: Emile Francis (18)
- Goals against average: Emile Francis (3.39)

The 1947–48 Chicago Black Hawks season was the team's 22nd season in the National Hockey League, and they were coming off a last place finish in the 1946–47 season, failing to qualify for post-season play.

The Black Hawks would make a big trade six games into the season, dealing the leading scorer from the 1946–47 season, Max Bentley, and Cy Thomas to the Toronto Maple Leafs in exchange for Gaye Stewart and Bud Poile. Midway through the season, after a 7–19–2 start, Chicago would fire Johnny Gottselig and replace him with former Maple Leafs star Charlie Conacher, who would lead the team to a respectable 13–15–4 record. The Hawks would finish in the basement of the NHL standings, with a record of 20–34–6, earning 46 points, and nine points behind the New York Rangers for the final playoff spot. The Hawks would score an NHL high 195 goals, but would allow an NHL worst 225.

Offensively, the Hawks were led by Doug Bentley, who earned team highs in assists (37) and points (57). Gaye Stewart would score a club high 26 goals and earn 55 points in 54 games with the Hawks, while Bud Poile would record 52 points. Ernie Dickens would lead the defense with 20 points, while Ralph Nattrass had a club high 79 penalty minutes.

In goal, Emile Francis would get the majority of the action, playing in 54 games, and winning 18 of them, posting a 3.39 GAA along the way and earning a shutout.

== Season standings ==
National Hockey League
		GP	W	L	T	GF	GA	DIFF	Pts
1	Toronto Maple Leafs	60	32	15	13	182	143	+39	77
2	Detroit Red Wings	60	30	18	12	187	148	+39	72
3	Boston Bruins	60	23	24	13	167	168	−1	59
4	New York Rangers	60	21	26	13	176	201	−25	55
5	Montreal Canadiens	60	20	29	11	147	169	−22	51
6	Chicago Black Hawks	60	20	34	6	195	225	−30	46

=== Record vs. opponents ===
1947–48 NHL Records
Team	BOS	CHI	DET	MTL	NYR	TOR
Boston	—	3–7–2	4–6–2	6–2–4	7–3–2	3–7–2
Chicago	7–3–2	—	2–10	4–7–1	6–4–2	1–10–1
Detroit	6–4–2	10–2	—	7–2–3	5–4–3	2–6–4
Montreal	2–6–4	7–4–1	2–7–3	—	3–7–2	6–5–1
New York	3–7–2	4–6–2	4–5–3	7–3–2	—	3–5–4
Toronto	7–3–2	10–1–1	6–2–4	5–6–1	5–3–4	—

== Schedule and results ==
1947–48 regular season
October

Game	Date	Visitor	Score	Home	Record	Points
1	October 15	Chicago Black Hawks	2–4	Detroit Red Wings	0–1–0	0
2	October 18	Chicago Black Hawks	2–4	Montreal Canadiens	0–2–0	0
3	October 25	Chicago Black Hawks	1–5	Toronto Maple Leafs	0–3–0	0
4	October 26	Chicago Black Hawks	2–3	Boston Bruins	0–4–0	0
5	October 29	Detroit Red Wings	5–2	Chicago Black Hawks	0–5–0	0

November

Game	Date	Visitor	Score	Home	Record	Points
6	November 2	Montreal Canadiens	4–2	Chicago Black Hawks	0–6–0	0
7	November 5	Boston Bruins	2–1	Chicago Black Hawks	0–7–0	0
8	November 9	New York Rangers	5–8	Chicago Black Hawks	1–7–0	2
9	November 12	Chicago Black Hawks	5–4	Toronto Maple Leafs	2–7–0	4
10	November 13	Chicago Black Hawks	2–5	Montreal Canadiens	2–8–0	4
11	November 15	Chicago Black Hawks	5–3	New York Rangers	3–8–0	6
12	November 16	Toronto Maple Leafs	5–4	Chicago Black Hawks	3–9–0	6
13	November 19	Montreal Canadiens	2–2	Chicago Black Hawks	3–9–1	7
14	November 22	Chicago Black Hawks	5–8	Detroit Red Wings	3–10–1	7
15	November 23	Detroit Red Wings	9–3	Chicago Black Hawks	3–11–1	7
16	November 26	Boston Bruins	3–5	Chicago Black Hawks	4–11–1	9
17	November 30	New York Rangers	6–2	Chicago Black Hawks	4–12–1	9

December

Game	Date	Visitor	Score	Home	Record	Points
18	December 3	Chicago Black Hawks	4–4	Boston Bruins	4–12–2	10
19	December 6	Chicago Black Hawks	5–12	Toronto Maple Leafs	4–13–2	10
20	December 7	Toronto Maple Leafs	3–2	Chicago Black Hawks	4–14–2	10
21	December 10	Boston Bruins	5–6	Chicago Black Hawks	5–14–2	12
22	December 13	Chicago Black Hawks	3–4	Detroit Red Wings	5–15–2	12
23	December 14	Montreal Canadiens	4–3	Chicago Black Hawks	5–16–2	12
24	December 17	Detroit Red Wings	7–1	Chicago Black Hawks	5–17–2	12
25	December 21	Toronto Maple Leafs	3–1	Chicago Black Hawks	5–18–2	12
26	December 23	New York Rangers	1–7	Chicago Black Hawks	6–18–2	14
27	December 25	Chicago Black Hawks	6–1	Boston Bruins	7–18–2	16
28	December 27	Chicago Black Hawks	1–3	Montreal Canadiens	7–19–2	16
29	December 31	Chicago Black Hawks	0–4	Detroit Red Wings	7–20–2	16

January

Game	Date	Visitor	Score	Home	Record	Points
30	January 1	Detroit Red Wings	4–1	Chicago Black Hawks	7–21–2	16
31	January 4	Chicago Black Hawks	4–1	New York Rangers	8–21–2	18
32	January 10	Chicago Black Hawks	4–6	Toronto Maple Leafs	8–22–2	18
33	January 11	Boston Bruins	1–4	Chicago Black Hawks	9–22–2	20
34	January 14	Chicago Black Hawks	2–4	New York Rangers	9–23–2	20
35	January 17	Chicago Black Hawks	1–3	Montreal Canadiens	9–24–2	20
36	January 18	Chicago Black Hawks	5–4	Detroit Red Wings	10–24–2	22
37	January 21	Montreal Canadiens	1–3	Chicago Black Hawks	11–24–2	24
38	January 24	Chicago Black Hawks	1–2	Toronto Maple Leafs	11–25–2	24
39	January 25	Toronto Maple Leafs	4–4	Chicago Black Hawks	11–25–3	25
40	January 28	New York Rangers	3–2	Chicago Black Hawks	11–26–3	25
41	January 31	Chicago Black Hawks	7–4	Boston Bruins	12–26–3	27

February

Game	Date	Visitor	Score	Home	Record	Points
42	February 1	Chicago Black Hawks	2–2	New York Rangers	12–26–4	28
43	February 3	Detroit Red Wings	4–1	Chicago Black Hawks	12–27–4	28
44	February 5	Chicago Black Hawks	7–2	Montreal Canadiens	13–27–4	30
45	February 8	New York Rangers	2–2	Chicago Black Hawks	13–27–5	31
46	February 11	Chicago Black Hawks	3–0	Boston Bruins	14–27–5	33
47	February 15	Montreal Canadiens	1–2	Chicago Black Hawks	15–27–5	35
48	February 18	Boston Bruins	4–2	Chicago Black Hawks	15–28–5	35
49	February 22	Toronto Maple Leafs	3–2	Chicago Black Hawks	15–29–5	35
50	February 25	Chicago Black Hawks	7–4	New York Rangers	16–29–5	37
51	February 28	Chicago Black Hawks	3–4	Toronto Maple Leafs	16–30–5	37
52	February 29	Boston Bruins	1–5	Chicago Black Hawks	17–30–5	39

March

Game	Date	Visitor	Score	Home	Record	Points
53	March 3	Chicago Black Hawks	3–3	Boston Bruins	17–30–6	40
54	March 7	Montreal Canadiens	3–9	Chicago Black Hawks	18–30–6	42
55	March 9	Detroit Red Wings	1–4	Chicago Black Hawks	19–30–6	44
56	March 10	Chicago Black Hawks	2–7	Detroit Red Wings	19–31–6	44
57	March 14	Toronto Maple Leafs	3–0	Chicago Black Hawks	19–32–6	44
58	March 17	New York Rangers	5–2	Chicago Black Hawks	19–33–6	44
59	March 20	Chicago Black Hawks	4–7	Montreal Canadiens	19–34–6	44
60	March 21	Chicago Black Hawks	4–3	New York Rangers	20–34–6	46

Legend: Win (2 points) Loss (0 points) Tie (1 point)

== Season stats ==
=== Scoring leaders ===
Player	GP	G	A	Pts	PIM
Doug Bentley	60	20	37	57	16
Gaye Stewart	54	26	29	55	74
Bud Poile	54	23	29	52	14
Roy Conacher	52	22	27	49	4
Hully Gee	60	14	25	39	18

=== Goaltending ===
Player	GP	TOI	W	L	T	GA	SO	GAA
Emile Francis	54	3240	18	31	5	183	1	3.39
Doug Jackson	6	360	2	3	1	42	0	7.00
