= 1947–48 NHL transactions =

The following is a list of all team-to-team transactions that have occurred in the National Hockey League (NHL) during the 1947–48 NHL season. It lists which team each player has been traded to and for which player(s) or other consideration(s), if applicable.

== Transactions ==
| June, 1947 exact date unknown | To Detroit Red Wings cash | To Chicago Black Hawks Doug Baldwin |
| June 2, 1947 | To Montreal Canadiens Paul Bibeault | To Chicago Black Hawks George Allen |
| August 19, 1947 | To Montreal Canadiens Joe Bell; Hal Laycoe; George Robertson | To New York Rangers Frank Eddolls; Buddy O'Connor |
| October 15, 1947 | To Boston Bruins Billy Taylor | To Detroit Red Wings Bep Guidolin |
| October 22, 1947 | To New York Rangers Roy Conacher^{1} | To Detroit Red Wings Ed Slowinski future considerations |
| November 1, 1947 | To Detroit Red Wings cash | To Chicago Black Hawks Roy Conacher |
| November 2, 1947 | To Toronto Maple Leafs Max Bentley; Cy Thomas | To Chicago Black Hawks Gus Bodnar; Ernie Dickens; Bob Goldham; Bud Poile; Gaye Stewart |
| December 16, 1947 | To Boston Bruins Jimmy Peters Sr. John Quilty | To Montreal Canadiens Joe Carveth |
| February 6, 1948 | To Boston Bruins Grant Warwick | To New York Rangers Billy Taylor future considerations^{2} (Ray Manson) (Pentti Lund) |
| April 26, 1948 | To Toronto Maple Leafs Cal Gardner; Bill Juzda; Rene Trudell rights to Frank Mathers | To New York Rangers Elwin Morris; Wally Stanowski |

Notes

1. Trade voided when Conacher refused to report to the Rangers.
2. Trade completed in June 1948 (exact date unknown).
