= 1947–48 New York Rangers season =

NHL hockey team season

1947–48 New York Rangers
- League: 4th NHL
- 1947–48 record: 21–26–13
- Home record: 11–12–7
- Road record: 10–14–6
- Goals for: 176
- Goals against: 201

Team information
- General manager: Frank Boucher
- Coach: Frank Boucher
- Captain: Neil Colville
- Arena: Madison Square Garden

Team leaders
- Goals: Tony Leswick/Buddy O'Connor (24)
- Assists: Buddy O'Connor (36)
- Points: Buddy O'Connor (60)
- Penalty minutes: Tony Leswick (76)
- Wins: Jim Henry (17)
- Goals against average: Jim Henry (3.19)

The 1947–48 New York Rangers season was the franchise's 22nd season. During the regular season, the Rangers had a 21–26–13 record and made the playoffs. In the league semi-finals, the Rangers lost to the Detroit Red Wings in six games.

== Regular season ==
=== Final standings ===
National Hockey League
		GP	W	L	T	GF	GA	DIFF	Pts
1	Toronto Maple Leafs	60	32	15	13	182	143	+39	77
2	Detroit Red Wings	60	30	18	12	187	148	+39	72
3	Boston Bruins	60	23	24	13	167	168	−1	59
4	New York Rangers	60	21	26	13	176	201	−25	55
5	Montreal Canadiens	60	20	29	11	147	169	−22	51
6	Chicago Black Hawks	60	20	34	6	195	225	−30	46

=== Record vs. opponents ===
1947–48 NHL Records
Team	BOS	CHI	DET	MTL	NYR	TOR
Boston	—	3–7–2	4–6–2	6–2–4	7–3–2	3–7–2
Chicago	7–3–2	—	2–10	4–7–1	6–4–2	1–10–1
Detroit	6–4–2	10–2	—	7–2–3	5–4–3	2–6–4
Montreal	2–6–4	7–4–1	2–7–3	—	3–7–2	6–5–1
New York	3–7–2	4–6–2	4–5–3	7–3–2	—	3–5–4
Toronto	7–3–2	10–1–1	6–2–4	5–6–1	5–3–4	—

== Schedule and results ==
1947–48 regular season
October: 1–3–0 (home: 0–1–0; road: 1–2–0)

Game	October	Opponent	Score	Record
1	16	@ Montreal Canadiens	2–1	1–0–0
2	19	@ Boston Bruins	3–1	1–1–0
3	22	@ Toronto Maple Leafs	3–1	1–2–0
4	29	Boston Bruins	3–1	1–3–0

November: 6–5–0 (home: 3–2–0; road: 3–3–0)

Game	November	Opponent	Score	Record
5	1	Detroit Red Wings	4–3	2–3–0
6	2	Toronto Maple Leafs	7–4	3–3–0
7	6	@ Detroit Red Wings	2–1	3–4–0
8	8	@ Toronto Maple Leafs	7–2	3–5–0
9	9	@ Chicago Black Hawks	8–5	3–6–0
10	12	Boston Bruins	8–2	3–7–0
11	15	Chicago Black Hawks	5–3	3–8–0
12	16	Montreal Canadiens	4–2	4–8–0
13	19	@ Detroit Red Wings	6–5	5–8–0
14	22	@ Montreal Canadiens	5–3	6–8–0
15	30	@ Chicago Black Hawks	6–2	7–8–0

December: 6–3–4 (home: 3–2–3; road: 3–1–1)

Game	December	Opponent	Score	Record
16	3	Toronto Maple Leafs	4–1	7–9–0
17	6	@ Boston Bruins	5–5	7–9–1
18	7	Detroit Red Wings	3–1	8–9–1
19	10	Montreal Canadiens	4–4	8–9–2
20	11	@ Montreal Canadiens	4–2	9–9–2
21	13	@ Toronto Maple Leafs	4–1	10–9–2
22	14	Detroit Red Wings	1–1	10–9–3
23	17	Boston Bruins	5–2	11–9–3
24	21	Montreal Canadiens	4–3	11–10–3
25	23	@ Chicago Black Hawks	7–1	11–11–3
26	25	@ Detroit Red Wings	2–0	12–11–3
27	28	Toronto Maple Leafs	1–1	12–11–4
28	31	Boston Bruins	7–3	13–11–4

January: 4–5–3 (home: 2–2–1; road: 2–3–2)

Game	January	Opponent	Score	Record
29	1	@ Boston Bruins	4–1	13–12–4
30	3	@ Toronto Maple Leafs	5–5	13–12–5
31	4	Chicago Black Hawks	4–1	13–13–5
32	7	@ Detroit Red Wings	6–0	13–14–5
33	10	@ Montreal Canadiens	1–1	13–14–6
34	11	Montreal Canadiens	3–1	14–14–6
35	14	Chicago Black Hawks	4–2	15–14–6
36	18	Toronto Maple Leafs	2–2	15–14–7
37	21	Detroit Red Wings	4–3	15–15–7
38	25	@ Boston Bruins	6–4	15–16–7
39	28	@ Chicago Black Hawks	3–2	16–16–7
40	31	@ Montreal Canadiens	4–2	17–16–7

February: 2–3–5 (home: 2–2–2; road: 0–1–3)

Game	February	Opponent	Score	Record
41	1	Chicago Black Hawks	2–2	17–16–8
42	4	@ Detroit Red Wings	4–4	17–16–9
43	7	@ Toronto Maple Leafs	3–0	17–17–9
44	8	@ Chicago Black Hawks	2–2	17–17–10
45	14	@ Boston Bruins	4–4	17–17–11
46	15	Toronto Maple Leafs	4–4	17–17–12
47	18	Detroit Red Wings	3–1	17–18–12
48	22	Boston Bruins	4–1	18–18–12
49	25	Chicago Black Hawks	7–4	18–19–12
50	29	Montreal Canadiens	5–3	19–19–12

March: 2–7–1 (home: 1–3–1; road: 1–4–0)

Game	March	Opponent	Score	Record
51	2	Toronto Maple Leafs	1–0	20–19–12
52	3	@ Detroit Red Wings	4–2	20–20–12
53	6	@ Toronto Maple Leafs	2–1	20–21–12
54	7	Detroit Red Wings	2–2	20–21–13
55	10	@ Boston Bruins	6–3	20–22–13
56	13	@ Montreal Canadiens	3–2	20–23–13
57	14	Montreal Canadiens	6–3	20–24–13
58	16	Boston Bruins	6–2	20–25–13
59	17	@ Chicago Black Hawks	5–2	21–25–13
60	21	Chicago Black Hawks	4–3	21–26–13

Legend: Win (2 points) Loss (0 points) Tie (1 point)

== Playoffs ==
1948 Stanley Cup playoffs
Semifinals vs. (2) Detroit Red Wings – Detroit wins 4–2

Game	Date	Visitor	Score	Home	OT	Series
1	March 24	New York Rangers	1–2	Detroit Red Wings		Detroit leads series 1–0
2	March 26	New York Rangers	2–5	Detroit Red Wings		Detroit leads series 2–0
3	March 28	Detroit Red Wings	2–3	New York Rangers		Detroit leads series 2–1
4	March 30	Detroit Red Wings	1–3	New York Rangers		Series tied 2–2
5	April 1	New York Rangers	1–3	Detroit Red Wings		Detroit leads series 3–2
6	April 4	Detroit Red Wings	4–2	New York Rangers		Detroit wins series 4–2

Legend: Win Loss

== Player statistics ==
Skaters

Regular season
Player	GP	G	A	Pts	PIM
Herbert O'Connor	60	24	36	60	8
Edgar Laprade	59	13	24	47	7
Tony Leswick	60	24	16	40	76
Phil Watson	54	18	15	33	54
Don Raleigh	52	15	18	33	2
Ed Kullman	51	15	17	32	32
Grant Warwick^{‡}	40	17	12	29	30
Cal Gardner	58	7	18	25	71
Bryan Hextall	43	8	14	22	18
Rene Trudell	54	13	7	20	30
Frank Eddolls	58	6	13	19	16
Neil Colville	55	4	12	16	25
Bill Moe	59	1	15	16	31
Bill Juzda	60	3	9	12	70
Ed Slowinski	38	6	5	11	2
Church Russell	19	0	3	3	2
Ronnie Rowe	5	1	0	1	0
Fred Shero	19	1	0	1	2
Jean Lamirande	18	0	1	1	6
Herb Foster	1	0	0	0	0
Larry Kwong	1	0	0	0	0
Fern Perreault	2	0	0	0	0
Hub Anslow	2	0	0	0	0
Billy Taylor^{†}	2	0	0	0	0
Winston Juckes	2	0	0	0	0

Playoffs
Player	GP	G	A	Pts	PIM
Phil Watson	5	2	3	5	2
Tony Leswick	6	3	2	5	8
Edgar Laprade	6	1	4	5	0
Herbert O'Connor	6	1	4	5	0
Bryan Hextall	6	1	3	4	0
Don Raleigh	6	2	0	2	2
Nick Mickoski	2	0	1	1	0
Dunc Fisher	1	0	1	1	0
Fred Shero	7	0	1	1	2
Neil Colville	7	0	1	1	2
Ed Kullman	7	0	1	1	2
Jack Lancien	2	0	0	0	2
Ken Davies	1	0	0	0	0
Jean Lamirande	6	0	0	0	4
Ed Slowinski	4	0	0	0	0
Bill Juzda	6	0	0	0	9
Bill Moe	1	0	0	0	0
Frank Eddolls	2	0	0	0	0
Rene Trudell	5	0	0	0	0
Cal Gardner	5	0	0	0	0

Goaltenders

Regular season
Player	GP	TOI	W	L	T	GA	GAA	SO
Jim Henry	48	2880	17	18	13	153	3.19	2
Chuck Rayner	12	691	4	7	0	42	3.65	0
Bob DeCourcy	1	29	0	1	0	6	12.41	0

Playoffs
Player	GP	TOI	W	L	GA	GAA	SO
Chuck Rayner	6	360	2	4	17	2.83	0

^{†}Denotes player spent time with another team before joining Rangers. Stats reflect time with Rangers only.
^{‡}Traded mid-season. Stats reflect time with Rangers only.

Note:

Pos = Position;GP = Games played; G = Goals; A = Assists; Pts = Points; PIM = Penalty minutes; +/- = Plus/minus; PPG = Power-play goals; SHG = Short-handed goals; GWG = Game-winning goals
Pos = Position;GP = Games played; Min, TOI = Minutes played; W = Wins; L = Losses; T,T/OT = Ties; OTL = Overtime losses; GA = Goals-against; GAA = Goals-against average; SO = Shutouts; SA = Shots against; SV = Shots saved;SV% = Save percentage;

== See also ==
- 1947–48 NHL season
