= 1947–48 Boston Bruins season =

NHL team season

1947–48 Boston Bruins
- League: 3rd NHL
- 1947–48 record: 23–24–13
- Home record: 12–8–10
- Road record: 11–16–3
- Goals for: 167
- Goals against: 168

Team information
- General manager: Art Ross
- Coach: Dit Clapper
- Captain: Milt Schmidt
- Arena: Boston Garden

Team leaders
- Goals: Pete Babando (23)
- Assists: Woody Dumart (16)
- Points: Woody Dumart (37)
- Penalty minutes: Pat Egan (81)
- Wins: Frank Brimsek (23)
- Goals against average: Frank Brimsek (2.80)

The 1947–48 Boston Bruins season was the Bruins' 24th season in the NHL.

== Regular season ==
=== Final standings ===
National Hockey League
		GP	W	L	T	GF	GA	DIFF	Pts
1	Toronto Maple Leafs	60	32	15	13	182	143	+39	77
2	Detroit Red Wings	60	30	18	12	187	148	+39	72
3	Boston Bruins	60	23	24	13	167	168	−1	59
4	New York Rangers	60	21	26	13	176	201	−25	55
5	Montreal Canadiens	60	20	29	11	147	169	−22	51
6	Chicago Black Hawks	60	20	34	6	195	225	−30	46

=== Record vs. opponents ===
1947–48 NHL Records
Team	BOS	CHI	DET	MTL	NYR	TOR
Boston	—	3–7–2	4–6–2	6–2–4	7–3–2	3–7–2
Chicago	7–3–2	—	2–10	4–7–1	6–4–2	1–10–1
Detroit	6–4–2	10–2	—	7–2–3	5–4–3	2–6–4
Montreal	2–6–4	7–4–1	2–7–3	—	3–7–2	6–5–1
New York	3–7–2	4–6–2	4–5–3	7–3–2	—	3–5–4
Toronto	7–3–2	10–1–1	6–2–4	5–6–1	5–3–4	—

== Schedule and results ==
1947–48 regular season
October

Game	Result	Date	Score	Opponent	Record
1	W	October 19, 1947	3–1	New York Rangers (1947–48)	1–0–0
2	W	October 22, 1947	3–1	Montreal Canadiens (1947–48)	2–0–0
4	W	October 26, 1947	3–2	Chicago Black Hawks (1947–48)	3–1–0
5	W	October 29, 1947	3–1	@ New York Rangers (1947–48)	4–1–0

November

Game	Result	Date	Score	Opponent	Record
6	T	November 1, 1947	1–1	@ Toronto Maple Leafs (1947–48)	4–1–1
7	L	November 2, 1947	2–3	@ Detroit Red Wings (1947–48)	4–2–1
8	W	November 5, 1947	2–1	@ Chicago Black Hawks (1947–48)	5–2–1
9	W	November 12, 1947	8–2	@ New York Rangers (1947–48)	6–2–1
10	W	November 15, 1947	9–1	@ Montreal Canadiens (1947–48)	7–2–1
11	L	November 16, 1947	1–2	Detroit Red Wings (1947–48)	7–3–1
12	W	November 19, 1947	7–2	Toronto Maple Leafs (1947–48)	8–3–1
13	L	November 22, 1947	3–4	@ Toronto Maple Leafs (1947–48)	8–4–1
14	T	November 23, 1947	2–2	Montreal Canadiens (1947–48)	8–4–2
15	L	November 26, 1947	3–5	@ Chicago Black Hawks (1947–48)	8–5–2
16	L	November 27, 1947	1–4	@ Detroit Red Wings (1947–48)	8–6–2
17	T	November 30, 1947	0–0	Toronto Maple Leafs (1947–48)	8–6–3

December

Game	Result	Date	Score	Opponent	Record
18	T	December 3, 1947	4–4	Chicago Black Hawks (1947–48)	8–6–4
19	T	December 6, 1947	5–5	New York Rangers (1947–48)	8–6–5
20	W	December 7, 1947	1–0	Montreal Canadiens (1947–48)	9–6–5
21	L	December 10, 1947	5–6	@ Chicago Black Hawks (1947–48)	9–7–5
22	T	December 14, 1947	1–1	Toronto Maple Leafs (1947–48)	9–7–6
23	L	December 17, 1947	2–5	@ New York Rangers (1947–48)	9–8–6
24	W	December 20, 1947	4–2	@ Montreal Canadiens (1947–48)	10–8–6
25	L	December 21, 1947	5–6	Detroit Red Wings (1947–48)	10–9–6
26	L	December 25, 1947	1–6	Chicago Black Hawks (1947–48)	10–10–6
27	L	December 27, 1947	1–2	@ Toronto Maple Leafs (1947–48)	10–11–6
28	L	December 28, 1947	0–3	@ Detroit Red Wings (1947–48)	10–12–6
29	L	December 31, 1947	3–7	@ New York Rangers (1947–48)	10–13–6

January

Game	Result	Date	Score	Opponent	Record
30	W	January 1, 1948	4–1	New York Rangers (1947–48)	11–13–6
31	T	January 3, 1948	2–2	@ Montreal Canadiens (1947–48)	11–13–7
32	W	January 10, 1948	4–1	@ Detroit Red Wings (1947–48)	12–13–7
33	L	January 11, 1948	1–4	@ Chicago Black Hawks (1947–48)	12–14–7
34	T	January 14, 1948	3–3	Detroit Red Wings (1947–48)	12–14–8
35	L	January 17, 1948	1–4	@ Toronto Maple Leafs (1947–48)	12–15–8
36	T	January 18, 1948	1–1	Montreal Canadiens (1947–48)	12–15–9
37	W	January 21, 1948	2–1	Toronto Maple Leafs (1947–48)	13–15–9
38	W	January 25, 1948	6–4	New York Rangers (1947–48)	14–15–9
39	L	January 28, 1948	2–4	Detroit Red Wings (1947–48)	14–16–9
40	L	January 31, 1948	4–7	Chicago Black Hawks (1947–48)	14–17–9

February

Game	Result	Date	Score	Opponent	Record
41	L	February 1, 1948	0–3	Montreal Canadiens (1947–48)	14–18–9
42	L	February 4, 1948	2–4	Toronto Maple Leafs (1947–48)	14–19–9
43	W	February 8, 1948	3–1	@ Detroit Red Wings (1947–48)	15–19–9
44	L	February 11, 1948	0–3	Chicago Black Hawks (1947–48)	15–20–9
45	T	February 14, 1948	4–4	New York Rangers (1947–48)	15–20–10
46	W	February 15, 1948	3–1	Detroit Red Wings (1947–48)	16–20–10
47	W	February 18, 1948	4–2	@ Chicago Black Hawks (1947–48)	17–20–10
48	W	February 21, 1948	3–1	@ Montreal Canadiens (1947–48)	18–20–10
49	L	February 22, 1948	1–4	@ New York Rangers (1947–48)	18–21–10
50	L	February 25, 1948	2–4	@ Toronto Maple Leafs (1947–48)	18–22–10
51	L	February 29, 1948	1–5	@ Chicago Black Hawks (1947–48)	18–23–10

March

Game	Result	Date	Score	Opponent	Record
52	T	March 3, 1948	4–4	Chicago Black Hawks (1947–48)	18–23–11
53	T	March 4, 1948	1–1	@ Montreal Canadiens (1947–48)	18–23–12
54	W	March 7, 1948	3–1	Toronto Maple Leafs (1947–48)	19–23–12
55	W	March 10, 1948	6–3	New York Rangers (1947–48)	20–23–12
56	L	March 13, 1948	2–5	@ Toronto Maple Leafs (1947–48)	20–24–12
57	W	March 14, 1948	5–1	@ Detroit Red Wings (1947–48)	21–24–12
58	W	March 16, 1948	6–2	@ New York Rangers (1947–48)	22–24–12
59	T	March 17, 1948	0–0	Detroit Red Wings (1947–48)	22–24–13
60	W	March 21, 1948	4–3	Montreal Canadiens (1947–48)	23–24–13

Legend: Win (2 points) Loss (0 points) Tie (1 point)

== Player statistics ==
=== Regular season ===
Scoring

Player	Pos	GP	G	A	Pts	PIM
Woody Dumart	LW	59	21	16	37	14
Pete Babando	LW	60	23	11	34	52
Don Gallinger	C	54	10	21	31	37
Jimmy Peters	RW	37	12	15	27	38
Milt Schmidt	C/D	33	9	17	26	28
Ed Sandford	LW	59	10	15	25	25
Ken Smith	LW	60	11	12	23	14
Billy Taylor	C	39	4	16	20	25
Wally Wilson	C	53	11	8	19	18
Pat Egan	D	60	8	11	19	81
Clare Martin	D	59	5	13	18	34
Joe Carveth	RW	22	8	9	17	2
Murray Henderson	D	49	6	8	14	50
Jack Crawford	D	45	3	11	14	10
Paul Ronty	C	24	3	11	14	0
Ed Harrison	C/LW	52	6	7	13	8
Grant Warwick	RW	18	6	5	11	8
Fern Flaman	D	56	4	6	10	69
Johnny Peirson	RW	15	4	2	6	0
John Quilty	C	6	3	2	5	2
Frank Brimsek	G	60	0	0	0	0
Arnie Kullman	C	1	0	0	0	0
Ray Manson	LW	1	0	0	0	0

Goaltending

Player	MIN	GP	W	L	T	GA	GAA	SO
Frank Brimsek	3600	60	23	24	13	168	2.80	3
Team:	3600	60	23	24	13	168	2.80	3

=== Playoffs ===
Scoring

Player	Pos	GP	G	A	Pts	PIM
Milt Schmidt	C/D	5	2	5	7	2
Johnny Peirson	RW	5	3	2	5	0
Ken Smith	LW	5	2	3	5	0
Paul Ronty	C	5	0	4	4	0
Jimmy Peters	RW	5	1	2	3	2
Grant Warwick	RW	5	0	3	3	4
Pete Babando	LW	5	1	1	2	2
Pat Egan	D	5	1	1	2	2
Ed Harrison	C/LW	5	1	0	1	2
Murray Henderson	D	3	1	0	1	5
Ed Sandford	LW	5	1	0	1	0
Jack Crawford	D	4	0	1	1	2
Frank Brimsek	G	5	0	0	0	0
Woody Dumart	LW	5	0	0	0	0
Fern Flaman	D	5	0	0	0	12
Pentti Lund	RW	2	0	0	0	0
Clare Martin	D	5	0	0	0	6
Wally Wilson	C	1	0	0	0	0

Goaltending

Player	MIN	GP	W	L	GA	GAA	SO
Frank Brimsek	317	5	1	4	20	3.79	0
Team:	317	5	1	4	20	3.79	0

Note:

Pos = Position;GP = Games played; G = Goals; A = Assists; Pts = Points; PIM = Penalty minutes; +/- = Plus/minus; PPG = Power-play goals; SHG = Short-handed goals; GWG = Game-winning goals
Pos = Position;GP = Games played; Min, TOI = Minutes played; W = Wins; L = Losses; T,T/OT = Ties; OTL = Overtime losses; GA = Goals-against; GAA = Goals-against average; SO = Shutouts; SA = Shots against; SV = Shots saved;SV% = Save percentage;

== See also ==
- 1947–48 NHL season
