= Ralph Nattrass =

Canadian ice hockey player

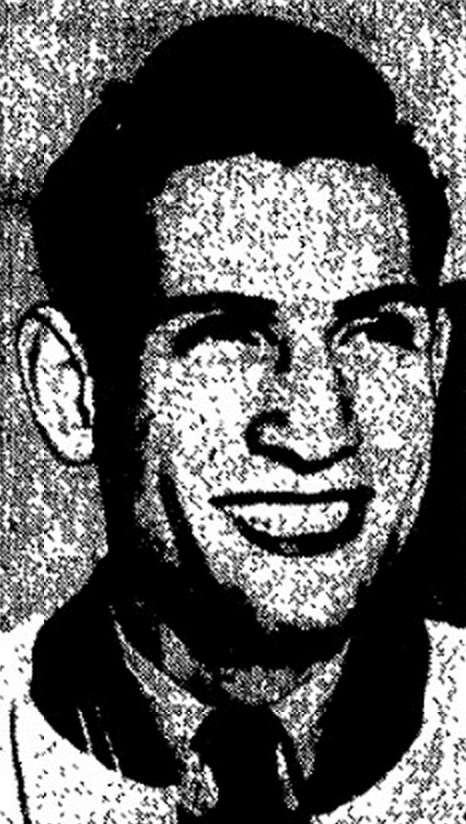
- Born: May 26, 1925; Gainsborough, Saskatchewan, Canada
- Died: April 30, 2014 (aged 88); Edmonton, Alberta, Canada
- Height: 6 ft 0 in (183 cm)
- Weight: 183 lb (83 kg; 13 st 1 lb)
- Position: Defence
- Shot: Right
- Played for: Chicago Black Hawks
- Playing career: 1945–1951

Ralph William Nattrass (May 26, 1925 – April 30, 2014) was a Canadian professional ice hockey player who played 223 games in the National Hockey League (NHL) with the Chicago Black Hawks between 1946 and 1950. In 2014, Nattress died at the Grey Nuns Community Hospital in Edmonton, Alberta.

== Career statistics ==
=== Regular season and playoffs ===
			Regular season					Playoffs
Season	Team	League	GP	G	A	Pts	PIM	GP	G	A	Pts	PIM
1943–44	Moose Jaw Canucks	S-SJHL	2	2	2	4	0	—	—	—	—	—
1944–45	Moose Jaw Canucks	S-SJHL	16	7	5	12	53	4	0	0	0	4
1944–45	Moose Jaw Canucks	M-Cup	—	—	—	—	—	17	9	5	14	33
1945–46	Kansas City Pla-Mors	USHL	50	4	20	24	75	12	2	5	7	20
1946–47	Kansas City Pla-Mors	USHL	17	1	5	6	22	—	—	—	—	—
1946–47	Chicago Black Hawks	NHL	35	4	5	9	34	—	—	—	—	—
1947–48	Chicago Black Hawks	NHL	60	5	12	17	79	—	—	—	—	—
1948–49	Chicago Black Hawks	NHL	60	4	10	14	99	—	—	—	—	—
1949–50	Chicago Black Hawks	NHL	68	5	11	16	96	—	—	—	—	—
1950–51	Cincinnati Mohawks	AHL	55	0	30	30	84	—	—	—	—	—
NHL totals			223	18	38	56	308	—	—	—	—	—
