= 1947–48 Montreal Canadiens season =

NHL hockey team season

1947–48 Montreal Canadiens
- League: 5th NHL
- 1947–48 record: 20–29–11
- Home record: 13–13–4
- Road record: 7–16–7
- Goals for: 147
- Goals against: 169

Team information
- General manager: Frank J. Selke
- Coach: Dick Irvin
- Captain: Toe Blake; Bill Durnan (Jan–Apr)
- Arena: Montreal Forum

Team leaders
- Goals: Elmer Lach (30)
- Assists: Elmer Lach (31)
- Points: Elmer Lach (61)
- Penalty minutes: Ken Reardon (129)
- Wins: Bill Durnan (20)
- Goals against average: Bill Durnan (2.77)

The 1947–48 Montreal Canadiens season was the 39th season in club history. The team finished fifth, four points out of a playoff spot and missed the playoffs for the first time since the 1939–40 season, their last time missing the playoffs until the 1969–70 season.

== Regular season ==
Bill Durnan was the last goaltender in the 20th century to serve as captain of an NHL team. He suffered his only losing season during the 1947–48 season, and, for the only time in his career, did not lead the league in goals against average.

=== Final standings ===
National Hockey League
		GP	W	L	T	GF	GA	DIFF	Pts
1	Toronto Maple Leafs	60	32	15	13	182	143	+39	77
2	Detroit Red Wings	60	30	18	12	187	148	+39	72
3	Boston Bruins	60	23	24	13	167	168	−1	59
4	New York Rangers	60	21	26	13	176	201	−25	55
5	Montreal Canadiens	60	20	29	11	147	169	−22	51
6	Chicago Black Hawks	60	20	34	6	195	225	−30	46

=== Record vs. opponents ===
1947–48 NHL Records
Team	BOS	CHI	DET	MTL	NYR	TOR
Boston	—	3–7–2	4–6–2	6–2–4	7–3–2	3–7–2
Chicago	7–3–2	—	2–10	4–7–1	6–4–2	1–10–1
Detroit	6–4–2	10–2	—	7–2–3	5–4–3	2–6–4
Montreal	2–6–4	7–4–1	2–7–3	—	3–7–2	6–5–1
New York	3–7–2	4–6–2	4–5–3	7–3–2	—	3–5–4
Toronto	7–3–2	10–1–1	6–2–4	5–6–1	5–3–4	—

== Schedule and results ==
1947–48 regular season
October

Game	Result	Date	Score	Opponent	Record
1	L	October 16, 1947	1–2	New York Rangers (1947–48)	0–1–0
2	W	October 18, 1947	4–2	Chicago Black Hawks (1947–48)	1–1–0
3	L	October 22, 1947	1–3	@ Boston Bruins (1947–48)	1–2–0
4	W	October 25, 1947	5–0	Boston Bruins (1947–48)	2–2–0
5	W	October 26, 1947	4–2	@ Detroit Red Wings (1947–48)	3–2–0
6	L	October 29, 1947	1–3	@ Toronto Maple Leafs (1947–48)	3–3–0

November

Game	Result	Date	Score	Opponent	Record
7	W	November 2, 1947	4–2	@ Chicago Black Hawks (1947–48)	4–3–0
8	W	November 6, 1947	3–0	Toronto Maple Leafs (1947–48)	5–3–0
9	L	November 8, 1947	1–3	Detroit Red Wings (1947–48)	5–4–0
10	W	November 13, 1947	5–2	Chicago Black Hawks (1947–48)	6–4–0
11	L	November 15, 1947	1–9	Boston Bruins (1947–48)	6–5–0
12	L	November 16, 1947	2–4	@ New York Rangers (1947–48)	6–6–0
13	T	November 19, 1947	2–2	@ Chicago Black Hawks (1947–48)	6–6–1
14	L	November 22, 1947	3–5	New York Rangers (1947–48)	6–7–1
15	T	November 23, 1947	2–2	@ Boston Bruins (1947–48)	6–7–2
16	W	November 27, 1947	2–0	Toronto Maple Leafs (1947–48)	7–7–2
17	L	November 29, 1947	1–3	@ Toronto Maple Leafs (1947–48)	7–8–2
18	T	November 30, 1947	1–1	@ Detroit Red Wings (1947–48)	7–8–3

December

Game	Result	Date	Score	Opponent	Record
19	W	December 6, 1947	4–0	Detroit Red Wings (1947–48)	8–8–3
20	L	December 7, 1947	0–1	@ Boston Bruins (1947–48)	8–9–3
21	T	December 10, 1947	4–4	@ New York Rangers (1947–48)	8–9–4
22	L	December 11, 1947	2–4	New York Rangers (1947–48)	8–10–4
23	W	December 14, 1947	4–3	@ Chicago Black Hawks (1947–48)	9–10–4
24	L	December 20, 1947	2–4	Boston Bruins (1947–48)	9–11–4
25	W	December 21, 1947	4–3	@ New York Rangers (1947–48)	10–11–4
26	L	December 25, 1947	0–3	Toronto Maple Leafs (1947–48)	10–12–4
27	W	December 27, 1947	3–1	Chicago Black Hawks (1947–48)	11–12–4

January

Game	Result	Date	Score	Opponent	Record
28	L	January 1, 1948	1–2	@ Toronto Maple Leafs (1947–48)	11–13–4
29	T	January 3, 1948	2–2	Boston Bruins (1947–48)	11–13–5
30	L	January 4, 1948	2–6	@ Detroit Red Wings (1947–48)	11–14–5
31	T	January 8, 1948	1–1	Detroit Red Wings (1947–48)	11–14–6
32	T	January 10, 1948	1–1	New York Rangers (1947–48)	11–14–7
33	L	January 11, 1948	1–3	@ New York Rangers (1947–48)	11–15–7
34	W	January 15, 1948	8–4	Toronto Maple Leafs (1947–48)	12–15–7
35	W	January 17, 1948	3–1	Chicago Black Hawks (1947–48)	13–15–7
36	T	January 18, 1948	1–1	@ Boston Bruins (1947–48)	13–15–8
37	L	January 21, 1948	1–3	@ Chicago Black Hawks (1947–48)	13–16–8
38	L	January 24, 1948	1–5	Detroit Red Wings (1947–48)	13–17–8
39	L	January 25, 1948	0–1	@ Detroit Red Wings (1947–48)	13–18–8
40	T	January 28, 1948	3–3	@ Toronto Maple Leafs (1947–48)	13–18–9
41	L	January 31, 1948	2–4	New York Rangers (1947–48)	13–19–9

February

Game	Result	Date	Score	Opponent	Record
42	W	February 1, 1948	3–0	@ Boston Bruins (1947–48)	14–19–9
43	L	February 5, 1948	2–7	Chicago Black Hawks (1947–48)	14–20–9
44	L	February 7, 1948	3–5	Detroit Red Wings (1947–48)	14–21–9
45	L	February 14, 1948	2–4	@ Toronto Maple Leafs (1947–48)	14–22–9
46	L	February 15, 1948	1–2	@ Chicago Black Hawks (1947–48)	14–23–9
47	W	February 19, 1948	3–1	Toronto Maple Leafs (1947–48)	15–23–9
48	L	February 21, 1948	1–3	Boston Bruins (1947–48)	15–24–9
49	L	February 22, 1948	3–4	@ Detroit Red Wings (1947–48)	15–25–9
50	L	February 28, 1948	2–5	Detroit Red Wings (1947–48)	15–26–9
51	L	February 29, 1948	3–5	@ New York Rangers (1947–48)	15–27–9

March

Game	Result	Date	Score	Opponent	Record
52	W	March 3, 1948	3–2	@ Toronto Maple Leafs (1947–48)	16–27–9
53	T	March 4, 1948	1–1	Boston Bruins (1947–48)	16–27–10
54	T	March 6, 1948	2–2	@ Detroit Red Wings (1947–48)	16–27–11
55	L	March 7, 1948	3–9	@ Chicago Black Hawks (1947–48)	16–28–11
56	W	March 11, 1948	3–1	Toronto Maple Leafs (1947–48)	17–28–11
57	W	March 13, 1948	3–2	New York Rangers (1947–48)	18–28–11
58	W	March 14, 1948	6–3	@ New York Rangers (1947–48)	19–28–11
59	W	March 20, 1948	7–4	Chicago Black Hawks (1947–48)	20–28–11
60	L	March 21, 1948	3–4	@ Boston Bruins (1947–48)	20–29–11

Legend: Win (2 points) Loss (0 points) Tie (1 point)

== Player statistics ==
=== Regular season ===
==== Scoring ====
Player	Pos	GP	G	A	Pts	PIM
Elmer Lach	C	60	30	31	61	72
Maurice Richard	RW	53	28	25	53	89
Toe Blake	LW	32	9	15	24	4
Ken Reardon	D	58	7	15	22	129
Billy Reay	C	60	6	14	20	24
Bob Fillion	LW	32	9	9	18	8
Roger Leger	D	48	4	14	18	26
Jacques Locas	RW	56	7	8	15	66
Norm Dussault	C	28	5	10	15	4
Glen Harmon	D	56	10	4	14	52
Joe Carveth	RW	35	1	10	11	6
Emile Bouchard	D	60	4	6	10	78
Murph Chamberlain	LW	30	6	3	9	62
Doug Harvey	D	35	4	4	8	32
Rip Riopelle	LW	55	5	2	7	12
Bob Carse	LW	22	3	3	6	16
Floyd Curry	RW	31	1	5	6	0
John Quilty	C	20	2	3	5	4
Tod Campeau	C	14	2	2	4	4
Jimmy Peters	RW	22	1	3	4	6
Hal Laycoe	D	14	1	2	3	4
Gerry Plamondon	LW	3	1	1	2	0
Murdo MacKay	RW/C	14	0	2	2	0
Ken Mosdell	C	23	1	0	1	19
Bill Durnan	G	59	0	0	0	5
Leo Gravelle	RW	15	0	0	0	0
Tom Johnson	D	1	0	0	0	0
Gerry McNeil	G	2	0	0	0	0
George Robertson	LW/C	1	0	0	0	0

==== Goaltending ====
Player	MIN	GP	W	L	T	GA	GAA	SO
Bill Durnan	3505	59	20	28	10	162	2.77	5
Gerry McNeil	95	2	0	1	1	7	4.42	0
Team:	3600	60	20	29	11	169	2.82	5

Note:

Pos = Position;GP = Games played; G = Goals; A = Assists; Pts = Points; PIM = Penalty minutes; +/- = Plus/minus; PPG = Power-play goals; SHG = Short-handed goals; GWG = Game-winning goals
Pos = Position;GP = Games played; Min, TOI = Minutes played; W = Wins; L = Losses; T,T/OT = Ties; OTL = Overtime losses; GA = Goals-against; GAA = Goals-against average; SO = Shutouts; SA = Shots against; SV = Shots saved;SV% = Save percentage;

== Awards and records ==
- Elmer Lach, Art Ross Trophy
- Elmer Lach, Centre, NHL First Team All-Star
- Ken Reardon, Defence, NHL Second Team All-Star
- Maurice Richard, Right Wing, NHL First Team All-Star
