= Rod Morrison =

Canadian ice hockey player

- Born: October 7, 1925; Saskatoon, Saskatchewan, Canada
- Died: October 10, 1998 (aged 73)
- Height: 5 ft 9 in (175 cm)
- Weight: 160 lb (73 kg; 11 st 6 lb)
- Position: Right wing
- Shot: Right
- Played for: Detroit Red Wings
- Playing career: 1943–1951

Roderick Finlay Morrison (October 7, 1925 – October 10, 1998) was a Canadian ice hockey player who played 34 games in the National Hockey League with the Detroit Red Wings during the 1947–48 season. The rest of his career, which lasted from 1943 to 1951, was spent in the minor leagues. Morrison was born in Saskatoon, Saskatchewan.

== Career statistics ==
=== Regular season and playoffs ===
			Regular season					Playoffs
Season	Team	League	GP	G	A	Pts	PIM	GP	G	A	Pts	PIM
1942–43	Saskatoon Quakers	N-SJHL	8	3	6	9	0	3	2	3	5	0
1942–43	Saskatoon Quakers	M-Cup	—	—	—	—	—	8	9	2	11	12
1943–44	Indianapolis Capitals	AHL	54	13	10	23	4	5	0	0	0	0
1944–45	Saskatoon Falcons	N-SJHL	8	7	3	10	6	2	2	1	3	0
1945–46	Omaha Knights	USHL	36	8	7	15	8	7	1	1	2	2
1946–47	Indianapolis Capitals	AHL	37	7	17	24	6	—	—	—	—	—
1947–48	Indianapolis Capitals	AHL	26	5	10	15	16	—	—	—	—	—
1947–48	Detroit Red Wings	NHL	34	8	7	15	4	3	0	0	0	0
1948–49	Indianapolis Capitals	AHL	65	22	29	51	34	2	0	0	0	0
1949–50	Indianapolis Capitals	AHL	69	27	31	58	15	8	4	5	9	0
1950–51	Indianapolis Capitals	AHL	68	14	33	47	14	3	2	1	3	0
AHL totals			319	88	130	218	89	18	6	6	12	0
NHL totals			34	8	7	15	4	3	0	0	0	0
