= Fern Gauthier =

Canadian ice hockey player (1919–1992)

- Fern Gauthier with Montreal, c. 1944–45
- Born: August 31, 1919; Chicoutimi, Quebec, Canada
- Died: November 7, 1992 (aged 73)
- Height: 5 ft 11 in (180 cm)
- Weight: 175 lb (79 kg; 12 st 7 lb)
- Position: Right wing
- Shot: Right
- Played for: Detroit Red Wings; Montreal Canadiens; New York Rangers
- Playing career: 1941–1951

Joseph Rene Fernand Gauthier (August 31, 1919 – November 7, 1992) was a Canadian professional ice hockey forward who played 229 games in the National Hockey League for the Montreal Canadiens, New York Rangers, and Detroit Red Wings between 1943 and 1949.

== Career statistics ==
=== Regular season and playoffs ===
			Regular season					Playoffs
Season	Team	League	GP	G	A	Pts	PIM	GP	G	A	Pts	PIM
1938–39	Shawinigan Falls Cataractes	QPSL	30	1	7	8	11	—	—	—	—	—
1939–40	Shawinigan Falls Cataractes	QPSL	38	16	10	26	23	—	—	—	—	—
1940–41	Shawinigan Falls Cataractes	QSHL	31	27	26	53	33	10	6	5	11	2
1941–42	Shawinigan Falls Cataractes	MDHL	32	30	21	51	22	10	7	4	11	6
1941–42	Washington Lions	AHL	7	0	0	0	0	—	—	—	—	—
1942–43	Washington Lions	AHL	35	11	6	17	11	—	—	—	—	—
1942–43	Buffalo Bisons	AHL	14	1	7	8	11	6	0	0	0	2
1943–44	New York Rangers	NHL	33	14	11	25	0	—	—	—	—	—
1943–44	Montreal Royals	QSHL	1	0	0	0	0	—	—	—	—	—
1944–45	Montreal Canadiens	NHL	50	18	13	31	23	4	0	0	0	0
1945–46	Detroit Red Wings	NHL	30	9	8	17	6	5	3	0	3	2
1945–46	Indianapolis Capitals	AHL	14	4	8	12	0	—	—	—	—	—
1946–47	Detroit Red Wings	NHL	40	1	12	13	2	3	1	0	1	0
1946–47	Indianapolis Capitals	AHL	16	7	17	24	6	—	—	—	—	—
1947–48	Detroit Red Wings	NHL	35	1	5	6	2	10	1	1	2	5
1947–48	Indianapolis Capitals	AHL	32	16	17	33	4	—	—	—	—	—
1948–49	Detroit Red Wings	NHL	41	3	2	5	0	—	—	—	—	—
1948–49	Indianapolis Capitals	AHL	11	1	3	4	0	—	—	—	—	—
1949–50	St. Louis Flyers	AHL	41	16	15	31	6	—	—	—	—	—
1950–51	Sherbrooke Saints	QSHL	10	2	5	7	6	—	—	—	—	—
1950–51	Quebec Aces	QSHL	25	6	19	25	8	19	4	4	8	4
1951–52	St-Laurent Castors	QSHL	46	33	32	65	—	—	—	—	—	—
NHL totals			229	46	51	97	33	22	5	1	6	7
