= Pat Lundy =

Canadian ice hockey player

- Born: May 21, 1924 Saskatoon, Saskatchewan, Canada
- Died: November 23, 1999 (aged 75)
- Height: 5 ft 11 in (180 cm)
- Weight: 170 lb (77 kg; 12 st 2 lb)
- Position: Centre
- Shot: Right
- Played for: Detroit Red Wings; Chicago Black Hawks
- Playing career: 1943–1960

Patrick Anthony Lundy (May 21, 1924 – November 23, 1999) was a Canadian professional ice hockey forward who played 150 games in the National Hockey League for the Chicago Black Hawks and Detroit Red Wings between 1946 and 1951. The rest of his career, which lasted from 1943 to 1962, was spent in various minor leagues.

== Playing career ==
Born in Saskatoon, Saskatchewan, Lundy played for the Regina Capitals of the WCSHL, the Indianapolis Capitals and the St. Louis Flyers of the AHL, the Milwaukee Sea Gulls of the USHL, the Regina Capitals of the SSHL and the Calgary Stampeders and the Brandon Regals of the WHL.

== Career statistics ==
=== Regular season and playoffs ===
			Regular season					Playoffs
Season	Team	League	GP	G	A	Pts	PIM	GP	G	A	Pts	PIM
1942–43	Saskatoon Quakers	NSJHL	8	11	4	15	4	3	4	3	7	4
1942–43	Saskatoon Quakers	M-Cup	—	—	—	—	—	8	1	6	7	14
1943–44	Saskatoon Navy	SSHL	18	26	20	46	7	4	3	3	6	0
1945–46	Detroit Red Wings	NHL	4	3	2	5	2	2	1	0	1	0
1945–46	Regina Capitals	WCSHL	34	19	22	41	24	3	0	0	0	0
1946–47	Detroit Red Wings	NHL	59	17	17	34	10	5	0	1	1	2
1947–48	Detroit Red Wings	NHL	11	4	1	5	6	5	1	1	2	0
1947–48	Indianapolis Capitals	AHL	39	17	28	45	20	—	—	—	—	—
1948–49	Detroit Red Wings	NHL	15	4	3	7	4	4	0	0	0	0
1948–49	Indianapolis Capitals	AHL	47	29	20	49	13	—	—	—	—	—
1949–50	Indianapolis Capitals	AHL	70	30	47	77	8	8	7	7	14	0
1950–51	Chicago Black Hawks	NHL	61	9	9	18	9	—	—	—	—	—
1950–51	Milwaukee Sea Gulls	USHL	9	7	6	13	0	—	—	—	—	—
1951–52	St. Louis Flyers	AHL	58	24	37	61	21	—	—	—	—	—
1952–53	Calgary Stampeders	WHL	68	25	24	49	20	5	1	5	6	0
1953–54	Calgary Stampeders	WHL	66	29	42	71	18	17	15	10	25	2
1954–55	Calgary Stampeders	WHL	65	28	33	61	10	9	3	3	6	2
1955–56	Brandon Regals	WHL	23	15	5	20	4	—	—	—	—	—
1958–59	Regina Capitals	SSHL	8	13	10	23	2	—	—	—	—	—
1959–60	Regina Capitals	SSHL	22	26	21	47	4	9	8	6	14	4
1960–61	Regina Capitals	SSHL	26	27	32	59	2	8	7	5	12	0
1961–62	Regina Capitals	SSHL	17	15	12	27	9	—	—	—	—	—
NHL totals			150	37	32	69	31	16	2	2	4	2
