= Kenny Smith (ice hockey) =

Canadian ice hockey player (1924–2000)

- Born: May 8, 1924 Moose Jaw, Saskatchewan, Canada
- Died: September 23, 2000 (aged 76)
- Height: 5 ft 7 in (170 cm)
- Weight: 150 lb (68 kg; 10 st 10 lb)
- Position: Left wing
- Shot: Left
- Played for: Boston Bruins
- Playing career: 1944–1957

Kenneth Alvin Smith (May 8, 1924 — September 23, 2000) was a Canadian ice hockey winger.

== Career ==
Smith played 331 games in the National Hockey League for the Boston Bruins between 1944 and 1951. The rest of his career, which lasted from 1944 to 1957, was primarily spent in the minor American Hockey League. His brother, Don, played 11 games with the New York Rangers in 1949–50.

== Career statistics ==
=== Regular season and playoffs ===
			Regular season					Playoffs
Season	Team	League	GP	G	A	Pts	PIM	GP	G	A	Pts	PIM
1940–41	Regina Wares Generals	SJHL	15	13	7	20	2	4	4	1	5	0
1941–42	Oshawa Generals	OHA	24	17	14	31	0	23	19	11	30	12
1941–42	Oshawa Generals	M-Cup	—	—	—	—	—	11	7	5	12	2
1942–43	Oshawa Generals	OHA	22	33	21	54	2	21	31	23	54	16
1942–43	Oshawa Generals	M-Cup	—	—	—	—	—	11	16	8	24	4
1943–44	Oshawa Generals	OHA	26	53	26	79	2	10	6	7	13	0
1943–44	Oshawa Generals	M-Cup	—	—	—	—	—	10	14	13	27	0
1944–45	Boston Bruins	NHL	49	20	14	34	2	7	3	4	7	0
1945–46	Boston Bruins	NHL	23	2	6	8	0	8	0	4	4	0
1945–46	Hershey Bears	AHL	27	10	13	23	8	—	—	—	—	—
1946–47	Boston Bruins	NHL	60	14	7	21	4	5	3	0	3	2
1947–48	Boston Bruins	NHL	60	11	12	23	14	5	2	3	5	0
1948–49	Boston Bruins	NHL	59	20	20	40	6	5	0	2	2	4
1949–50	Boston Bruins	NHL	66	10	31	41	12	—	—	—	—	—
1950–51	Boston Bruins	NHL	14	1	3	4	11	—	—	—	—	—
1950–51	Pittsburgh Hornets	AHL	55	8	23	31	33	13	2	7	9	4
1951–52	Pittsburgh Hornets	AHL	3	0	0	0	6	—	—	—	—	—
1951–52	Providence Reds	AHL	56	20	36	56	20	15	3	1	4	8
1952–53	Providence Reds	AHL	25	4	7	11	13	—	—	—	—	—
1953–54	Providence Reds	AHL	23	3	9	12	12	—	—	—	—	—
1953–54	Sydney Millionaires	MMHL	6	0	0	0	0	—	—	—	—	—
1954–55	Hershey Bears	AHL	50	12	16	28	16	—	—	—	—	—
1955–56	Hershey Bears	AHL	64	16	35	51	22	—	—	—	—	—
1956–57	Hershey Bears	AHL	17	0	2	2	4	—	—	—	—	—
AHL totals			320	73	141	214	134	28	5	8	13	12
NHL totals			331	78	93	171	49	30	8	13	21	6
