= Ernie Dickens =

Canadian ice hockey player (1921–1985)

- Born: June 25, 1921 Winnipeg, Manitoba, Canada
- Died: September 27, 1985 (aged 64) Bowmanville, Ontario, Canada
- Height: 6 ft 0 in (183 cm)
- Weight: 173 lb (78 kg; 12 st 5 lb)
- Position: Defence
- Shot: Left
- Played for: Toronto Maple Leafs; Chicago Black Hawks
- Playing career: 1937–1952

Ernest Leslie Dickens (June 25, 1921 – September 27, 1985) was a Canadian two-sport athlete from Manitoba. He played soccer for Winnipeg United Weston and then enjoyed a career as an ice hockey defenceman in the National Hockey League (NHL), playing with the Toronto Maple Leafs and Chicago Black Hawks between 1942 and 1951.

== Career statistics ==
=== Regular season and playoffs ===
			Regular season					Playoffs
Season	Team	League	GP	G	A	Pts	PIM	GP	G	A	Pts	PIM
1937–38	Winnipeg Rangers	MJHL	22	2	1	3	63	2	1	0	1	12
1938–39	St. James Canadians	MJHL	18	6	7	13	66	2	2	0	2	4
1939–40	Winnipeg Monarchs	MJHL	19	3	6	9	24	7	2	0	2	10
1940–41	Toronto Marlboros	OHA	15	2	7	9	50	12	3	8	11	10
1940–41	Toronto Marlboros	OHA Sr	1	0	0	0	2	—	—	—	—	—
1941–42	Toronto Maple Leafs	NHL	10	2	2	4	6	13	0	0	0	4
1941–42	Providence Reds	AHL	39	8	15	23	14	—	—	—	—	—
1942–43	Toronto RCAF	OHA Sr	10	4	7	11	10	9	3	1	4	11
1942–43	Toronto RCAF	Al-Cup	—	—	—	—	—	7	2	3	5	6
1943–44	Toronto RCAF	OHA Sr	10	1	2	3	6	—	—	—	—	—
1945–46	Toronto Maple Leafs	NHL	15	1	3	4	6	—	—	—	—	—
1945–46	Pittsburgh Hornets	AHL	29	4	16	20	16	6	1	2	3	0
1946–47	Pittsburgh Hornets	AHL	64	11	40	51	21	12	1	1	2	6
1947–48	Chicago Black Hawks	NHL	54	5	15	20	30	—	—	—	—	—
1947–48	Pittsburgh Hornets	AHL	9	0	4	4	2	—	—	—	—	—
1948–49	Chicago Black Hawks	NHL	59	2	3	5	14	—	—	—	—	—
1949–50	Chicago Black Hawks	NHL	70	0	13	13	22	—	—	—	—	—
1950–51	Chicago Black Hawks	NHL	70	2	8	10	20	—	—	—	—	—
1951–52	Calgary Stampeders	PCHL	69	14	34	48	20	—	—	—	—	—
NHL totals			278	12	44	56	98	13	0	0	0	4

== Awards and achievements ==
- Stanley Cup Championship (1942)
- AHL First All-Star Team (1947)
- Honoured Member of the Manitoba Hockey Hall of Fame
