= Ed Harrison (ice hockey) =

Canadian ice hockey player (1927-2012)

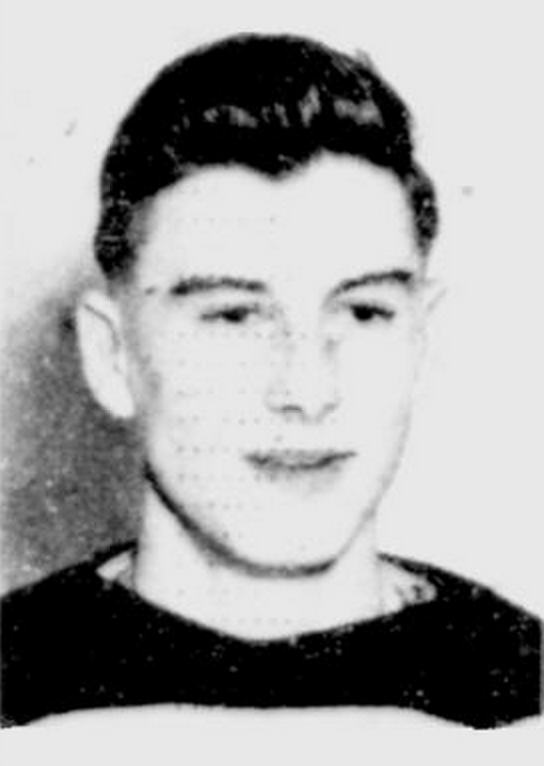
- Born: July 25, 1927; Mimico, Ontario, Canada
- Died: February 10, 2012 (aged 84); Brantford, Ontario, Canada
- Height: 6 ft 0 in (183 cm)
- Weight: 165 lb (75 kg; 11 st 11 lb)
- Position: Center
- Shot: Left
- Played for: Boston Bruins; New York Rangers
- Playing career: 1947–1962

Edward Francis Harrison (July 25, 1927 – February 10, 2012) was a Canadian professional ice hockey player who played 194 games in the National Hockey League between 1947 and 1951 with the Boston Bruins and New York Rangers. He played with the New York Rangers and Boston Bruins. He was predeceased by his wife Helen and survived by his five children, eleven grandchildren, and two great-grandchildren.

== Career statistics ==
=== Regular season and playoffs ===
			Regular season					Playoffs
Season	Team	League	GP	G	A	Pts	PIM	GP	G	A	Pts	PIM
1944–45	St. Michael's Majors	OHA	1	1	0	1	0	—	—	—	—	—
1944–45	St. Michael's Buzzers	OHA-B	11	16	14	30	4	11	17	12	29	8
1945–46	St. Michael's Majors	OHA	22	16	14	30	8	11	11	8	19	4
1946–47	St. Michael's Majors	OHA	29	29	25	54	33	9	11	7	18	14
1946–47	St. Michael's Majors	M-Cup	—	—	—	—	—	10	19	7	26	6
1947–48	Boston Bruins	NHL	52	6	7	13	8	5	1	0	1	2
1948–49	Boston Bruins	NHL	59	5	5	10	20	4	0	0	0	0
1949–50	Boston Bruins	NHL	70	14	12	26	23	—	—	—	—	—
1950–51	Boston Bruins	NHL	9	1	0	1	0	—	—	—	—	—
1950–51	New York Rangers	NHL	4	1	0	1	2	—	—	—	—	—
1950–51	Hershey Bears	AHL	48	24	14	38	23	6	1	6	7	0
1951–52	Cincinnati Mohawks	AHL	57	20	9	29	19	7	3	2	5	0
1952–53	Vancouver Canucks	WHL	5	0	1	1	0	—	—	—	—	—
1952–53	Syracuse Warriors	AHL	2	0	1	1	0	—	—	—	—	—
1952–53	St. Louis Flyers	AHL	10	2	1	3	2	—	—	—	—	—
1952–53	Washington Lions	EHL	17	5	10	15	4	—	—	—	—	—
1952–53	Quebec Aces	QHL	16	6	2	8	6	22	6	9	15	13
1953–54	Quebec Aces	QHL	33	3	2	5	4	—	—	—	—	—
1953–54	Sudbury Wolves	NOHA	13	8	3	11	0	11	5	3	8	2
1959–60	Woodstock Athletics	OHA Sr	—	—	—	—	—	—	—	—	—	—
1960–61	Woodstock Athletics	OHA Sr	28	12	11	23	2	—	—	—	—	—
1961–62	Woodstock Athletics	OHA Sr	28	9	17	26	0	12	1	1	2	0
NHL totals			194	27	24	51	53	9	1	0	1	2
