= Tony Leswick =

Canadian ice hockey player (1923–2001)

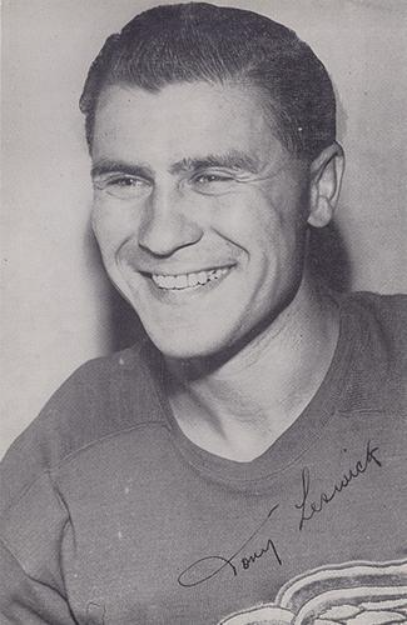
- Leswick with the Detroit Red Wings, c. 1950s
- Born: March 17, 1923 Humboldt, Saskatchewan, Canada
- Died: July 1, 2001 (aged 78) Coquitlam, British Columbia, Canada
- Height: 5 ft 6 in (168 cm)
- Weight: 155 lb (70 kg; 11 st 1 lb)
- Position: Left wing
- Shot: Right
- Played for: New York Rangers; Detroit Red Wings; Chicago Black Hawks
- Playing career: 1942–1960

Anthony Joseph Leswick (March 17, 1923 – July 1, 2001) was a Canadian ice hockey forward who played mostly for the New York Rangers and Detroit Red Wings of the National Hockey League (NHL). Leswick is best known for scoring the series-winning goal in overtime of game seven of the 1954 Stanley Cup Final.

== Playing career ==
=== Minor league hockey ===
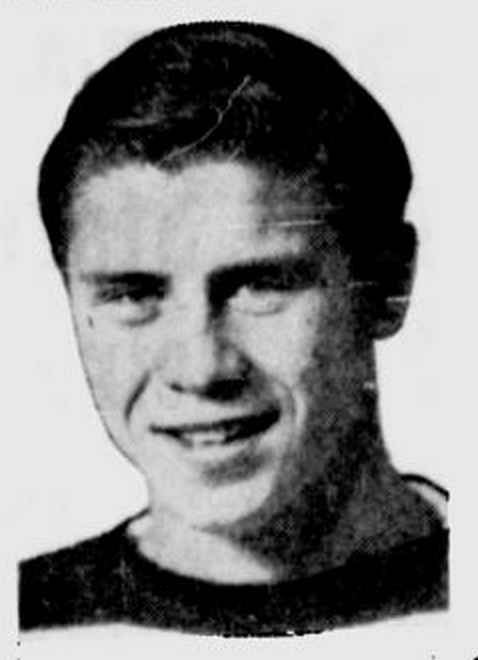
Leswick pictured with the Saskatoon Quakers, circa 1941

Leswick played his junior hockey with the Saskatoon Dodgers and Saskatoon Quakers, and quickly gained attention. In 1942, Leswick jumped to the American Hockey League (AHL) with the Cleveland Barons and scored 40 points in only 52 games. He moved onto the Pacific Coast Hockey League (PCHL) the following season to play for the New Westminster Royals. Scoring 36 points in 19 games there, he followed up his great season by joining with HMCS Chippawa of the Royal Canadian Navy Reserve, where he helped to win the 1944–45 Basil Baker trophy for inter-service hockey. The New York Rangers had acquired him in June 1945, and based on this performance added him to their lineup for the remainder of the 1945–46 NHL season.

=== Professional career ===
Leswick scored 15 goals in his shortened rookie season for the Rangers and quickly established himself as one of the few bright spots in New York. He enjoyed agitating opponents, including Maurice Richard of the Montreal Canadiens, and Gordie Howe of the Detroit Red Wings. Leswick recorded consecutive 20-goal seasons in 1946–47 and 1947–48, but the Rangers as a team struggled to succeed. After scoring 44 points in 1949–50, he was named to the NHL Second All-Star Team. During this time, he formed a successful combination with Edgar Laprade and Dunc Fisher.

Detroit was impressed by Leswick's when playing against Gordie Howe, and acquired him after the 1950–51 season in a blockbuster trade on June 8, with Gaye Stewart going to New York. Leswick was added to a line with Marty Pavelich and Glen Skov, and helped lead Detroit to Stanley Cup championships in 1952, 1954, and 1955. He is best remembered for his winning goal in game seven of the 1954 Stanley Cup Final against the Montreal Canadiens. Leswick recalled in an interview with Chuck O'Donnell,

"It was early in overtime, I don't know, maybe four or five minutes in. We were trying to change our forwards. I had the puck around centre ice or so and I just wanted to do the smart thing and throw it in. If I get caught with the puck and the Canadiens steal it, we may get caught and they may get an odd-man break. Just like that, the game could be over. So, I'm just thinking of lifting the puck down deep in their end, just making the safe play. So I flipped it in nice and high and turned to get off the ice. The next thing I know, everyone's celebrating. It had gone in. I said, "You've got to be kidding. It went in? Get out of here!""

Defenceman Doug Harvey went back to glove the puck, but instead deflected it past goaltender Gerry McNeil and into the net for the game-winning goal.

Following his third Stanley Cup victory in 1955, Leswick was traded to the Chicago Black Hawks along with Glen Skov, Johnny Wilson and Benny Woit for Jerry Toppazzini, John McCormack, Dave Creighton and Gord Hollingworth, on May 27. He scored 11 goals and 11 assists in the 1955–56 season for Chicago before jumping to the Edmonton Flyers of the Western Hockey League, for whom he scored 53 points in the 1956–57 season and he was named to another All-Star team. After a brief 22 games for Detroit in 1957, Leswick returned to the Edmonton Flyers until the close of the 1959 season. He played nine games the following season for the Vancouver Canucks of the WHL before retiring from playing.

=== Coaching ===
Leswick tried his hand at coaching starting in 1958, as a midseason replacement for the Edmonton Flyers in 1957–58 and continued until midseason of 1958–59. He felt he was more of a help to the team on the ice. He later coached Indianapolis Capitals/Cincinnati Wings of the Central Hockey League in the 1963–64 season. The team finished last in the league with a 12–53–7 record and Leswick subsequently retired from hockey.

== Awards and achievements ==
- Played in NHL All-Star Game (1947, 1948, 1949, 1950, 1952, 1954)
- NHL Second All-Star Team (1950)
- Stanley Cup Champions (1952, 1954, 1955)
- WHL Prairie Division Second All-Star Team (1957)
- In the 2009 book 100 Ranger Greats, was ranked No. 58 all-time of the 901 New York Rangers who had played during the team's first 82 seasons

== Personal life ==
Leswick's brothers Pete and Jack also played in the NHL. Jack won the Stanley Cup with Chicago in 1934.

His nephew is former Major League Baseball player Lenny Dykstra.

== Career statistics ==
=== Regular season and playoffs ===
			Regular season					Playoffs
Season	Team	League	GP	G	A	Pts	PIM	GP	G	A	Pts	PIM
1939–40	Saskatoon Dodgers	N-SJHL	4	5	2	7	13	2	4	1	5	0
1940–41	Saskatoon Jr. Quakers	N-SJHL	11	15	10	25	34	2	1	6	7	2
1940–41	Saskatoon Quakers	S-SJHL	1	0	0	0	2	—	—	—	—	—
1940–41	Saskatoon Jr. Quakers	M-Cup	—	—	—	—	—	12	7	4	11	14
1941–42	Saskatoon Quakers	SSHL	32	21	21	42	45	9	3	5	8	4
1941–42	Saskatoon Quakers	Al-Cup	—	—	—	—	—	5	2	3	5	4
1942–43	Cleveland Barons	AHL	52	14	26	40	43	4	3	3	6	4
1942–43	Victoria VMD	NNDHL	2	0	2	2	0	—	—	—	—	—
1943–44	Saskatoon Navy	SSHL	18	26	26	52	50	4	3	2	5	18
1943–44	New Westminster Royals	NWIHL	19	25	11	36	10	2	0	2	2	0
1944–45	Winnipeg Navy	WNDHL	12	9	8	17	33	6	7	2	9	12
1945–46	New York Rangers	NHL	50	15	9	24	26	—	—	—	—	—
1946–47	New York Rangers	NHL	59	27	14	41	51	—	—	—	—	—
1947–48	New York Rangers	NHL	60	24	16	40	76	6	3	2	5	8
1948–49	New York Rangers	NHL	60	13	14	27	70	—	—	—	—	—
1949–50	New York Rangers	NHL	69	19	25	44	85	12	2	4	6	12
1950–51	New York Rangers	NHL	70	15	11	26	112	—	—	—	—	—
1951–52	Detroit Red Wings	NHL	70	9	10	19	93	8	3	1	4	22
1952–53	Detroit Red Wings	NHL	70	15	12	27	87	6	1	0	1	11
1953–54	Detroit Red Wings	NHL	70	6	18	24	90	12	3	1	4	18
1954–55	Detroit Red Wings	NHL	70	10	17	27	137	11	1	2	3	20
1955–56	Chicago Black Hawks	NHL	70	11	11	22	71	—	—	—	—	—
1956–57	Edmonton Flyers	WHL	60	22	31	53	107	8	2	1	3	6
1957–58	Detroit Red Wings	NHL	22	1	2	3	2	4	0	0	0	0
1957–58	Edmonton Flyers	WHL	42	10	15	25	46	—	—	—	—	—
1958–59	Edmonton Flyers	WHL	36	3	13	16	27	—	—	—	—	—
1959–60	Vancouver Canucks	WHL	9	3	6	9	0	11	0	1	1	0
NHL totals			740	165	159	324	900	59	13	10	23	91
