= Harry Watson (ice hockey, born 1923) =

Canadian ice hockey player (1923–2002)

- Hockey Hall of Fame, 1994
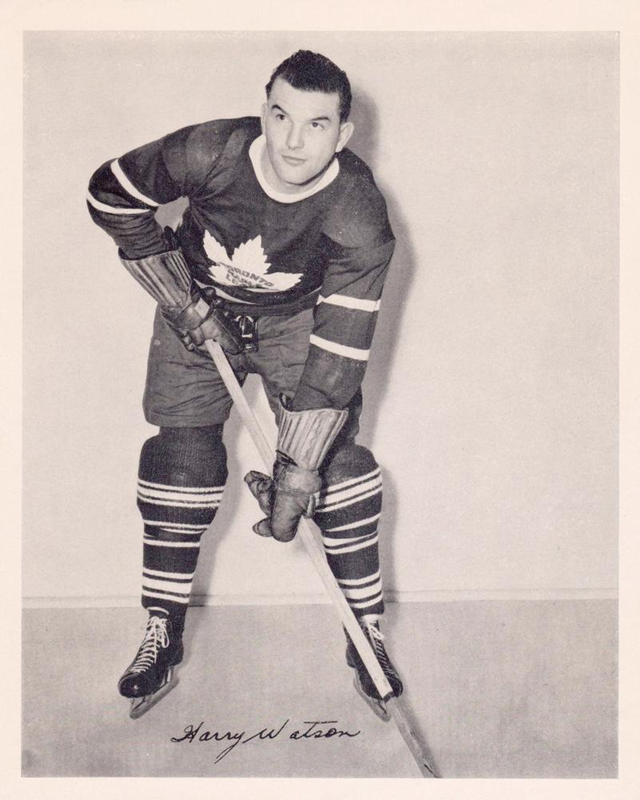
- Born: May 6, 1923 Saskatoon, Saskatchewan, Canada
- Died: November 19, 2002 (aged 79)
- Height: 6 ft 1 in (185 cm)
- Weight: 200 lb (91 kg; 14 st 4 lb)
- Position: Left wing
- Shot: Left
- Played for: Brooklyn Americans; Detroit Red Wings; Toronto Maple Leafs; Chicago Black Hawks
- Playing career: 1941–1957

Harold Percival "Whipper" Watson (May 6, 1923 – November 19, 2002) was a Canadian professional ice hockey left wing who played for the Brooklyn Americans, Detroit Red Wings, Toronto Maple Leafs, and Chicago Black Hawks, winning five Stanley Cups over a 14-year career in the National Hockey League.

== Early life ==
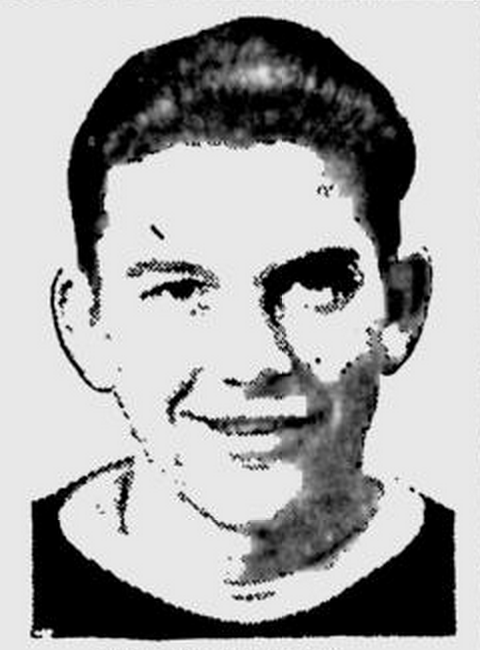
Watson photo, c. 1941

Born in Saskatoon, Saskatchewan, Watson played junior hockey for the Saskatoon Junior Chiefs (1938–39), the Saskatoon Chiefs and Saskatoon Dodgers (1939–40), and the Saskatoon Junior Quakers (1940–41).

== Career ==
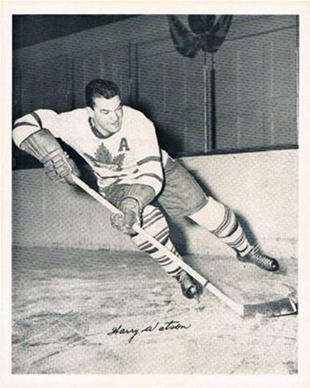
1940s/1950s Quaker Oats photo of Watson in action for Toronto Maple Leafs

In 1941, at age 18, Watson turned professional with the Brooklyn Americans in the NHL in what would be the team's final season. He was selected by the Detroit Red Wings in an intraleague draft and played there in 1942–43, winning his first Stanley Cup. Watson then joined the Royal Canadian Air Force as World War II escalated. While in the military, he played for the Montreal RCAF team in 1943–44, as well as for the Saskatoon RCAF squad. The following season, he played for the Winnipeg RCAF team.

After a two-year break from the NHL, Watson rejoined the Red Wings after the war for one season and was traded to the Toronto Maple Leafs on September 21, 1946, for Billy Taylor. Watson played eight seasons for the Leafs, winning four Stanley Cups over that period. In 1948–49, he led the Leafs in points and goals, with 26 goals and 19 assists in 60 games. He didn't take a single penalty through the entire regular season.

Shortly into the 1954–55 season, the Leafs sold Watson to the Chicago Black Hawks. After three years in Chicago, Watson played one more year as a professional, as player-coach of the Buffalo Bisons in the American Hockey League, before retiring in 1958. He coached the St. Catharines Teepees of the Ontario Hockey League in 1958–59, and coached the senior Windsor Bulldogs to an Allan Cup championship in 1962–63.

Through his 14 years in the NHL, Watson played 809 games, scoring 236 goals and 207 assists for 443 points. He won five Stanley Cups (1943 with Detroit, and 1947, 1948, 1949, and 1951 with Toronto). He was inducted into the Hockey Hall of Fame in 1994, although his year of induction is sometimes erroneously reported as 1963, the year which a player of the same namesake was inducted.

== Career statistics ==
			Regular season					Playoffs
Season	Team	League	GP	G	A	Pts	PIM	GP	G	A	Pts	PIM
1938–39	Saskatoon Jr. Chiefs	N-SJHL	3	0	1	1	0	—	—	—	—	—
1939–40	Saskatoon Chiefs	SAHA	—	—	—	—	—	4	7	4	11	2
1939–40	Saskatoon Dodgers	SJHL	—	—	—	—	—	2	6	2	8	2
1939–40	Saskatoon Dodgers	M-Cup	—	—	—	—	—	4	7	4	11	2
1940–41	Saskatoon Jr. Quakers	N-SJHL	6	10	8	18	4	2	3	1	4	2
1940–41	Saskatoon Jr. Quakers	M-Cup	—	—	—	—	—	14	14	5	19	4
1941–42	Brooklyn Americans	NHL	47	10	8	18	6	—	—	—	—	—
1942–43	Detroit Red Wings	NHL	50	13	18	31	10	7	0	0	0	0
1943–44	Montreal RCAF	QSHL	7	7	4	11	4	—	—	—	—	—
1943–44	Saskatoon Navy	SSHL	2	6	2	8	2	—	—	—	—	—
1944–45	Winnipeg RCAF	WNDHL	1	2	0	2	0	4	7	0	7	2
1945–46	Detroit Red Wings	NHL	44	14	10	24	4	5	2	0	2	0
1946–47	Toronto Maple Leafs	NHL	44	19	15	34	10	11	3	2	5	0
1947–48	Toronto Maple Leafs	NHL	57	21	20	41	16	9	5	2	7	9
1948–49	Toronto Maple Leafs	NHL	60	26	19	45	0	9	4	2	6	2
1949–50	Toronto Maple Leafs	NHL	60	19	16	35	11	7	0	0	0	2
1950–51	Toronto Maple Leafs	NHL	68	18	19	37	18	5	1	2	3	4
1951–52	Toronto Maple Leafs	NHL	70	22	17	39	18	4	1	0	1	2
1952–53	Toronto Maple Leafs	NHL	63	16	8	24	8	—	—	—	—	—
1953–54	Toronto Maple Leafs	NHL	70	21	7	28	30	5	0	1	1	2
1954–55	Toronto Maple Leafs	NHL	8	1	1	2	0	—	—	—	—	—
1954–55	Chicago Black Hawks	NHL	43	14	16	30	4	—	—	—	—	—
1955–56	Chicago Black Hawks	NHL	55	11	14	25	6	—	—	—	—	—
1956–57	Chicago Black Hawks	NHL	70	11	19	30	9	—	—	—	—	—
1957–58	Buffalo Bisons	AHL	52	8	15	23	10	—	—	—	—	—
NHL totals			809	236	207	443	150	62	16	9	25	27
