= Garth Boesch =

Canadian ice hockey player

- Born: October 7, 1920 Milestone, Saskatchewan, Canada
- Died: May 14, 1998 (aged 77) San Francisco, California, U.S.
- Height: 6 ft 0 in (183 cm)
- Weight: 180 lb (82 kg; 12 st 12 lb)
- Position: Defence
- Shot: Right
- Played for: Toronto Maple Leafs
- Playing career: 1940–1950

Garth Vernon Boesch (October 7, 1920 – May 14, 1998) was a Canadian ice hockey defenceman who played in the National Hockey League with the Toronto Maple Leafs between 1946 and 1950. He won the Stanley Cup three times with Toronto, from 1947 to 1949.

== Playing career ==
Boesch played four seasons with the Toronto Maple Leafs and was a member of three Stanley Cup winning teams in 1947, 1948 and 1949.

He died of heart disease at the age of 77 on May 14, 1998.

== Career statistics ==
=== Regular season and playoffs ===
			Regular season					Playoffs
Season	Team	League	GP	G	A	Pts	PIM	GP	G	A	Pts	PIM
1937–38	Notre Dame Hounds	S-SJHL	6	5	0	5	4	2	0	0	0	0
1938–39	Notre Dame Hounds	S-SJHL	9	5	1	6	4	—	—	—	—	—
1939–40	Notre Dame Hounds	S-SJHL	12	7	4	11	12	—	—	—	—	—
1940–41	Regina Rangers	SSHL	32	10	7	17	26	8	1	2	3	10
1940–41	Regina Rangers	Al-Cup	—	—	—	—	—	14	6	2	8	16
1941–42	Regina Rangers	SSHL	31	12	8	20	36	3	0	0	0	6
1941–42	Lethbridge Maple Leafs	ASHL	—	—	—	—	—	9	2	2	4	2
1941–42	Lethbridge Maple Leafs	Al-Cup	—	—	—	—	—	5	1	1	2	8
1944–45	Winnipeg RCAF	WNDHL	1	0	1	1	0	4	2	1	3	10
1945–46	Pittsburgh Hornets	AHL	43	15	9	24	16	6	0	4	4	8
1946–47	Toronto Maple Leafs	NHL	35	4	5	9	47	11	0	2	2	6
1947–48	Toronto Maple Leafs	NHL	45	2	7	9	52	8	2	1	3	2
1948–49	Toronto Maple Leafs	NHL	59	1	10	11	43	9	0	2	2	6
1949–50	Toronto Maple Leafs	NHL	58	2	6	8	61	6	0	0	0	4
NHL totals			197	9	28	37	203	34	2	5	7	18

== Awards and achievements ==
- 1948 NHL All Star
- 1949 NHL All Star
