= Cy Thomas =

Welsh ice hockey player

- Born: August 5, 1926 Dowlais, Wales, U.K.
- Died: January 2, 2009 (aged 82)
- Height: 5 ft 11 in (180 cm)
- Weight: 185 lb (84 kg; 13 st 3 lb)
- Position: Winger
- Shot: Left
- Played for: Chicago Black Hawks; Toronto Maple Leafs
- Playing career: 1946–1952

Cyril James Thomas (August 5, 1926 – January 2, 2009) was a Canadian professional ice hockey player who played 14 games in the National Hockey League with the Chicago Black Hawks and Toronto Maple Leafs during the 1947–48 season. The rest of his career lasted from 1946 to 1952 and was spent in various minor leagues. Born in Dowlais, Wales, but grew up in Edmonton, Alberta.

== Career statistics ==
=== Regular season and playoffs ===
| | | | Regular season | | | | | Playoffs |
| Season | Team | League | GP | G | A | Pts | PIM | GP | G | A | Pts | PIM |
|---|---|---|---|---|---|---|---|---|---|---|---|---|
| 1945–46 | Edmonton Canadians | EJrHL | — | — | — | — | — | — | — | — | — | — |
| 1945–46 | Edmonton Canadians | M-Cup | — | — | — | — | — | 14 | 10 | 9 | 19 | 18 |
| 1946–47 | Edmonton Flyers | WCSHL | 30 | 12 | 7 | 19 | 18 | 4 | 0 | 3 | 3 | 7 |
| 1947–48 | Chicago Black Hawks | NHL | 6 | 1 | 0 | 1 | 8 | — | — | — | — | — |
| 1947–48 | Toronto Maple Leafs | NHL | 8 | 1 | 2 | 3 | 4 | — | — | — | — | — |
| 1947–48 | Pittsburgh Hornets | AHL | 29 | 2 | 4 | 6 | 14 | 2 | 0 | 0 | 0 | 0 |
| 1947–48 | Spokane Spartans | WIHL | 18 | 9 | 19 | 28 | 28 | — | — | — | — | — |
| 1948–49 | University of Alberta | ESrHL | 8 | 8 | 8 | 16 | 16 | — | — | — | — | — |
| 1949–50 | Saskatoon Quakers | WCSHL | 50 | 30 | 24 | 54 | 90 | 5 | 1 | 1 | 2 | 6 |
| 1950–51 | Halifax St. Mary's | MMHL | 60 | 29 | 29 | 58 | 91 | 12 | 6 | 5 | 11 | 25 |
| 1951–52 | Calgary Stampeders | PCHL | 69 | 24 | 43 | 67 | 83 | — | — | — | — | — |
| NHL totals | | | 14 | 2 | 2 | 4 | 12 | — | — | — | — | — |

== See also ==
- List of National Hockey League players from the United Kingdom
