= Chuck Rayner =

Canadian hockey goaltender (1920–2002)

- Hockey Hall of Fame, 1973
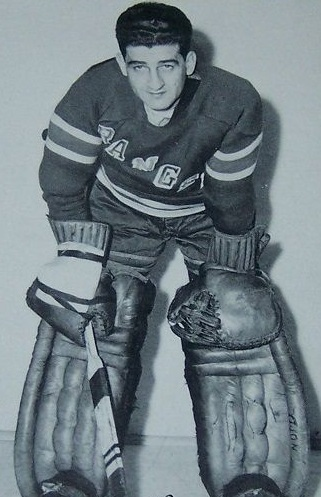
- Born: August 11, 1920 Sutherland, Saskatchewan, Canada
- Died: October 6, 2002 (aged 82) Langley, British Columbia, Canada
- Height: 5 ft 11 in (180 cm)
- Weight: 190 lb (86 kg; 13 st 8 lb)
- Position: Goaltender
- Caught: Left
- Played for: New York Americans; New York Rangers
- Playing career: 1941–1953

Claude Earl "Chuck" Rayner (August 11, 1920 – October 6, 2002), nicknamed "Bonnie Prince Charlie", was a Canadian professional hockey goaltender who played nine seasons in the National Hockey League (NHL) for the New York Americans and New York Rangers. He is a member of the Hockey Hall of Fame.

== Early life ==
Rayner was born August 11, 1920, in Sutherland, Saskatoon.

== Playing career ==
Playing his junior career for the Kenora Thistles of the Manitoba Junior Hockey League, Rayner showed his skill early, backstopping the team to the Abbott Cup to advance to the Memorial Cup championship in 1940. The next season, he turned professional for the New York Americans, spending most of the year with their minor league affiliate, the Springfield Indians of the American Hockey League (AHL). With the Indians, Rayner led the league in shutouts and goals against average and was named to the Second All-Star Team.

The following season Rayner was the leading goalie for the Americans' final season before the team folded. World War II interrupted Rayner's career, however, and he spent the next three years in the Royal Canadian Navy, where he played two seasons for naval teams based out of Victoria, British Columbia.

After the war, he signed as a free agent in 1945 with the New York Rangers. Rayner was the starting goaltender for New York six of the next seven seasons, earning accolades for his play even though the Rangers' teams of the era were weak, and Rayner never had a winning record. He was noted as a puckhandling goalie, attempting several times throughout his career to score a goal.

Even though he played on poor teams throughout his career and never won a Stanley Cup, "Bonnie Prince Charlie" was one of the best goalies of his era. The three years between 1948 and 1951 were his best, and he won the Hart Trophy as the NHL's most valuable player in 1950, after leading the Rangers to overtime in the seventh game of the Stanley Cup finals.

== Post-NHL career ==
In 1953, Rayner suffered a knee injury and lost his job as Rangers' starter to Gump Worsley. He played one more season in the minors for the Saskatoon Quakers of the Western Hockey League and a couple of brief stints in the senior leagues the two seasons thereafter before hanging up his skates for good. Rayner was the last active NHL player who played for the New York Americans before their name change to the Brooklyn Americans.

He was inducted into the Hockey Hall of Fame in 1973, the second goaltender in history to be inducted with a losing record.

Although his hometown of Sutherland became annexed into Saskatoon, Rayner Avenue in the city's Sutherland neighbourhood is named in his honor.

Rayner died on October 6, 2002, of a heart attack.

== Awards and achievements ==
- Turnbull Cup MJHL Championship (1940)
- AHL Second All-Star Team (1941)
- NHL Second All-Star Team (1949, 1950, & 1951)
- Hart Memorial Trophy Winner (1950)
- Played in the NHL All-Star Game (1949, 1950, & 1951)
- Inducted into the Hockey Hall of Fame in 1973
- Honoured Member of the Manitoba Hockey Hall of Fame
- In the 2009 book 100 Ranger Greats, was ranked No. 16 all-time of the 901 New York Rangers who had played during the team's first 82 seasons

== Career statistics ==
=== Regular season and playoffs ===
			Regular season								Playoffs
Season	Team	League	GP	W	L	T	Min	GA	SO	GAA	GP	W	L	Min	GA	SO	GAA
1936–37	Saskatoon Wesleys	SJHL	—	—	—	—	—	—	—	—	3	3	0	180	4	0	1.33
1936–37	Saskatoon Wesleys	M-Cup	—	—	—	—	—	—	—	—	9	7	2	550	20	2	2.18
1937–38	Kenora Thistles	MJHL	22	—	—	—	1350	103	0	4.58	—	—	—	—	—	—	—
1938–39	Kenora Thistles	MJHL	22	—	—	—	1350	64	0	2.84	—	—	—	—	—	—	—
1939–40	Kenora Thistles	MJHL	24	15	5	4	1480	66	1	2.68	9	—	—	540	18	0	2.00
1940–41	New York Americans	NHL	12	2	7	3	773	44	0	3.42	—	—	—	—	—	—	—
1940–41	Springfield Indians	AHL	37	17	13	6	2280	87	6	2.29	—	—	—	—	—	—	—
1941–42	Brooklyn Americans	NHL	36	13	21	2	2230	129	1	3.47	—	—	—	—	—	—	—
1941–42	Springfield Indians	AHL	1	1	0	0	60	4	0	4.00	—	—	—	—	—	—	—
1942–43	Victoria Navy	NNDHL	12	—	—	—	720	39	1	3.25	6	2	4	370	29	0	4.70
1943–44	Victoria Navy	PCHL	18	—	—	—	1080	52	1	2.89	2	1	1	130	6	0	2.77
1943–44	Halifax RCAF	HCHL	—	—	—	—	—	—	—	—	—	—	—	—	—	—	—
1943–44	Halifax RCAF	Al-Cup	—	—	—	—	—	—	—	—	2	1	1	130	6	0	2.77
1945–46	New York Rangers	NHL	40	12	21	7	2377	149	1	3.76	—	—	—	—	—	—	—
1946–47	New York Rangers	NHL	58	22	30	6	3480	177	5	3.05	—	—	—	—	—	—	—
1947–48	New York Rangers	NHL	12	4	7	0	691	42	0	3.65	6	2	4	360	17	0	2.83
1947–48	New Haven Ramblers	AHL	15	7	6	2	900	40	0	2.67	—	—	—	—	—	—	—
1948–49	New York Rangers	NHL	58	16	31	11	3480	168	7	2.90	—	—	—	—	—	—	—
1949–50	New York Rangers	NHL	69	28	30	11	4140	181	6	2.62	12	7	5	775	29	1	2.25
1950–51	New York Rangers	NHL	66	19	28	19	3940	187	2	2.85	—	—	—	—	—	—	—
1951–52	New York Rangers	NHL	53	18	25	10	3180	159	2	3.00	—	—	—	—	—	—	—
1952–53	New York Rangers	NHL	20	4	8	8	1200	58	1	2.90	—	—	—	—	—	—	—
1953–54	Saskatoon Quakers	WHL	68	31	28	9	4045	204	6	3.03	6	2	4	360	23	1	3.83
1954–55	Nelson Maple Leafs	WIHL	2	—	—	—	120	4	0	2.00	1	1	0	60	2	0	2.00
1955–56	Nelson Maple Leafs	WIHL	6	—	—	—	360	18	0	3.00	—	—	—	—	—	—	—
NHL totals			424	138	208	77	25,491	1294	25	3.05	18	9	9	1135	46	1	2.43

Preceded by Sid Abel	Winner of the Hart Trophy; 1950	Succeeded by Milt Schmidt
