= 1947–48 NHL season =

Professional ice hockey league season

- League: National Hockey League
- Sport: Ice hockey
- Duration: October 15, 1947 – April 14, 1948
- Games: 60
- Teams: 6

Regular season
- Season champion: Toronto Maple Leafs
- Season MVP: Bud O'Connor (Rangers)
- Top scorer: Elmer Lach (Canadiens)

Stanley Cup
- Champions: Toronto Maple Leafs
- Runners-up: Detroit Red Wings

NHL seasons
- ← 1946–47 1948–49 →

The 1947–48 NHL season was the 31st season of the National Hockey League. Six teams played 60 games each. The Toronto Maple Leafs were the Stanley Cup winners. They defeated the Detroit Red Wings four games to none. This season saw the introduction of a new trophy – Art Ross Trophy – that would be handed out to the player who scored the most points during the regular season.

== Regular season ==
The season saw the return of the National Hockey League All-Star Game, an idea that, although proposed in the previous season, came into fruition this year. The all-star game, however, saw a bad ankle injury to Chicago Black Hawks forward Bill Mosienko that nearly ended his career. Other stars would retire, ending both the Montreal Canadiens' Punch line and the Boston Bruins' Kraut line. However, this season saw the creation of the Detroit Red Wings' Production Line. The policy of having players raise their hockey sticks to signify that a goal was scored was also initiated in this season, at the suggestion of Frank Patrick, with Habs forward Billy Reay being the first to do on November 13, 1947. The season also saw Boston's Don Gallinger suspended indefinitely pending an investigation of gambling activities and the New York Rangers' Billy "The Kid" Taylor being expelled for life for gambling.

Seven games into the season, the Toronto Maple Leafs and Chicago Black Hawks made, at that time, the biggest trade in NHL history. The Maple Leafs sent five players to the Black Hawks in trade for Max Bentley and rookie winger Cy Thomas. Thomas only played eight games that year but Bentley handed to the Leafs a much-needed offensive boost that helped propel the team to first overall and an eventual Stanley Cup.

The New York Rangers decided to make a trade to improve their fortunes and sent Hal Laycoe, Joe Bell, and George Robertson to Montreal in exchange for Buddy O'Connor and defenceman Frank Eddolls. Montreal missed O'Connor, as their goal-scoring plummeted. Ken Mosdell was out from the start of the season with a broken arm, Rocket Richard had trouble with a bad knee and Murph Chamberlain broke his leg. In an attempt to boost the goal-scoring, Montreal traded Jimmy Peters and Johnny Quilty to Boston in exchange for Joe Carveth, but the rot continued. However, the worst occurred on January 11, 1948, when the Canadiens played the Rangers at Madison Square Garden. The Habs lost more than a game when Bill Juzda checked captain Toe Blake into the boards, breaking Blake's ankle and ending his career. It was also the end of the famed "Punch Line". (Ironically, that same night, Johnny Quilty's career was ended with a compound fracture of the leg). The Canadiens missed the playoffs for the first time since 1940, and Bill Durnan, for the only time in his career, failed to win the Vezina Trophy. This season was also the last season in which a goaltender was allowed to be named captain of their team. Bill Durnan was the last goaltender in NHL history to be captain. Toronto's Turk Broda won the Vezina this season.

=== Final standings ===
National Hockey League
		GP	W	L	T	GF	GA	DIFF	Pts
1	Toronto Maple Leafs	60	32	15	13	182	143	+39	77
2	Detroit Red Wings	60	30	18	12	187	148	+39	72
3	Boston Bruins	60	23	24	13	167	168	−1	59
4	New York Rangers	60	21	26	13	176	201	−25	55
5	Montreal Canadiens	60	20	29	11	147	169	−22	51
6	Chicago Black Hawks	60	20	34	6	195	225	−30	46

== Playoffs ==
=== Playoff bracket ===
The top four teams in the league qualified for the playoffs. In the semifinals, the first-place team played the third-place team, while the second-place team faced the fourth-place team, with the winners advancing to the Stanley Cup Finals. In both rounds, teams competed in a best-of-seven series (scores in the bracket indicate the number of games won in each best-of-seven series).

Semifinals
1	Toronto	4
3	Boston	1
2	Detroit	4
4	New York	2

Stanley Cup Finals
1	Toronto	4
2	Detroit	0

=== Semifinals ===
==== (1) Toronto Maple Leafs vs. (3) Boston Bruins ====
Toronto defeated Boston four games to one, although Boston kept it closer than the series tally would indicate. Three of the five games were decided by a single goal.

March 24	Boston Bruins	4–5	OT	Toronto Maple Leafs	Maple Leaf Gardens	Recap
Murray Henderson (1) – 01:18		First period		11:29 – Bill Ezinicki (1)
Ed Harrison (1) – 08:39		Second period		17:33 – Max Bentley (1)
Pat Egan (1) – 02:35; Ken Smith (1) – 08:38		Third period		12:03 – Syl Apps (1); 15:34 – Jimmy Thomson (1)
No scoring		First overtime period		17:03 – Nick Metz (1)
Frank Brimsek		Goalie stats		Turk Broda

March 27	Boston Bruins	3–5	Toronto Maple Leafs	Maple Leaf Gardens	Recap
Johnny Peirson (1) – pp – 08:39		First period	05:41 – Ted Kennedy (1); 19:54 – pp – Ted Kennedy (2)
Pete Babando (1) – pp – 02:16		Second period	06:34 – Ted Kennedy (3); 12:24 – Ted Kennedy (4)
Milt Schmidt (1) – 10:43		Third period	07:37 – Max Bentley (2)
Frank Brimsek		Goalie stats	Turk Broda

March 30	Toronto Maple Leafs	5–1	Boston Bruins	Boston Garden	Recap
Howie Meeker (1) – 03:40; Bill Barilko (1) – 12:28		First period	No scoring
Ted Kennedy (5) – 09:24		Second period	01:10 – Milt Schmidt (2)
Garth Boesch (1) – 07:00; Nick Metz (2) – 17:49		Third period	No scoring
Turk Broda		Goalie stats	Frank Brimsek

April 1	Toronto Maple Leafs	2–3	Boston Bruins	Boston Garden	Recap
No scoring		First period	02:47 – Ed Sandford (1)
Bill Ezinicki (2) – 01:36		Second period	07:31 – Johnny Peirson (2)
Syl Apps (2) – 15:08		Third period	13:24 – Johnny Peirson (3)
Turk Broda		Goalie stats	Frank Brimsek

April 3	Boston Bruins	2–3	Toronto Maple Leafs	Maple Leaf Gardens	Recap
Jimmy Peters (1) – pp – 05:20		First period	08:41 – Vic Lynn (1); 16:13 – Les Costello (1)
Ken Smith (2) – 12:08		Second period	No scoring
No scoring		Third period	05:52 – Ted Kennedy (6)
Frank Brimsek		Goalie stats	Turk Broda

Toronto won series 4–1

==== (2) Detroit Red Wings vs. (4) New York Rangers ====
It looked initially to be a close series as, after the Blueshirts lost the first two games, the Rangers won the next two to tie the series. Detroit then took the next two to win the series in six games to qualify for the Finals.

March 24	New York Rangers	1–2	Detroit Red Wings	Olympia Stadium	Recap
No scoring		First period	15:04 – Ted Lindsay (1); 19:06 – pp – Jim Conacher (1)
No scoring		Second period	No scoring
Tony Leswick (1) – 03:35		Third period	No scoring
Chuck Rayner		Goalie stats	Harry Lumley

March 26	New York Rangers	2–5	Detroit Red Wings	Olympia Stadium	Recap
Edgar Laprade (1) – 14:53		First period	04:00 – Jim McFadden (1)
No scoring		Second period	04:57 – Jim McFadden (2); 08:18 – pp – Marty Pavelich (1)
Neil Colville (1) – 10:51		Third period	10:04 – Leo Reise (1); 14:49 – Marty Pavelich (2)
Chuck Rayner		Goalie stats	Harry Lumley

March 28	Detroit Red Wings	2–3	New York Rangers	Madison Square Garden III	Recap
No scoring		First period	03:32 – Phil Watson (1); 10:35 – Phil Watson (2)
Ted Lindsay (2) – 19:40		Second period	No scoring
Jack Stewart (1) – 16:03		Third period	09:02 – Tony Leswick (2)
Harry Lumley		Goalie stats	Chuck Rayner

March 30	Detroit Red Wings	1–3	New York Rangers	Madison Square Garden III	Recap
Jim McFadden (3) – 03:41		First period	No scoring
No scoring		Second period	10:08 – pp – Bryan Hextall (1); 10:41 – Eddie Kullman (1)
No scoring		Third period	13:32 – Tony Leswick (3)
Harry Lumley		Goalie stats	Chuck Rayner

April 1	New York Rangers	1–3	Detroit Red Wings	Olympia Stadium	Recap
No scoring		First period	04:02 – pp – Red Kelly (1)
No scoring		Second period	14:13 – pp – Pete Horeck (1)
Buddy O'Connor (1) – 12:49		Third period	13:55 – Red Kelly (2)
Chuck Rayner		Goalie stats	Harry Lumley

April 4	Detroit Red Wings	4–2	New York Rangers	Madison Square Garden III	Recap
Red Kelly (3) – pp – 13:46; Gordie Howe (1) – pp – 14:30; Pat Lundy (1) – 17:51		First period	No scoring
No scoring		Second period	No scoring
Jim McFadden (4) – 10:49		Third period	12:49 – Don Raleigh (1); 19:08 – Don Raleigh (2)
Harry Lumley		Goalie stats	Chuck Rayner

Detroit won series 4–2

=== Stanley Cup Finals ===
April 7	Detroit Red Wings	3–5	Toronto Maple Leafs	Maple Leaf Gardens	Recap
Jim McFadden (5) – 07:20		First period	08:21 – Harry Watson (1); 09:04 – Joe Klukay (1); 18:24 – Syl Apps (3)
No scoring		Second period	14:31 – Gus Mortson (1); 19:21 – Howie Meeker (2)
Jim Conacher (2) – 04:28; Ted Lindsay (3) – 05:25		Third period	No scoring
Harry Lumley		Goalie stats	Turk Broda

April 10	Detroit Red Wings	2–4	Toronto Maple Leafs	Maple Leaf Gardens	Recap
No scoring		First period	13:31 – Max Bentley (3)
Pete Horeck (2) – 18:18		Second period	03:38 – pp – Bill Ezinicki (3); 17:16 – pp – Max Bentley (4); 18:50 – Harry Watson (2)
Fern Gauthier (1) – pp – 17:18		Third period	No scoring
Harry Lumley		Goalie stats	Turk Broda

April 11	Toronto Maple Leafs	2–0	Detroit Red Wings	Olympia Stadium	Recap
No scoring		First period	No scoring
Harry Watson (3) – 19:42		Second period	No scoring
Vic Lynn (2) – 15:16		Third period	No scoring
Turk Broda		Goalie stats	Harry Lumley

April 14	Toronto Maple Leafs	7–2	Detroit Red Wings	Olympia Stadium	Recap
Ted Kennedy (7) – pp – 02:51; Garth Boesch (2) – sh – 05:03; Harry Watson (4) – 11:13		First period	No scoring
Syl Apps (4) – 04:26; Ted Kennedy (8) – 09:42; Harry Watson (5) – sh – 11:38		Second period	02:41 – Leo Reise (2)
Les Costello (2) – pp – 14:37		Third period	18:48 – Pete Horeck (3)
Turk Broda		Goalie stats	Harry Lumley

Toronto won series 4–0

== Awards ==
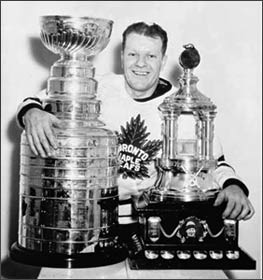
Turk Broda with the Stanley Cup and the Vezina Trophy

O'Brien Cup: (Stanley Cup runner-up)	Detroit Red Wings
Prince of Wales Trophy: (Top regular season record)	Toronto Maple Leafs
Art Ross Trophy: (Top scorer)	Elmer Lach, Montreal Canadiens
Calder Memorial Trophy: (Top first-year player)	Jim McFadden, Detroit Red Wings
Hart Trophy: (Most valuable player)	Bud O'Connor, New York Rangers
Lady Byng Trophy: (Excellence and sportsmanship)	Bud O'Connor, New York Rangers
Vezina Trophy: (Goaltender of team with lowest GAA)	Turk Broda, Toronto Maple Leafs

=== All-Star teams ===
First team	Position	Second team
Turk Broda, Toronto Maple Leafs	G	Frank Brimsek, Boston Bruins
Bill Quackenbush, Detroit Red Wings	D	Ken Reardon, Montreal Canadiens
Jack Stewart, Detroit Red Wings	D	Neil Colville, New York Rangers
Elmer Lach, Montreal Canadiens	C	Buddy O'Connor, New York Rangers
Maurice Richard, Montreal Canadiens	RW	Bud Poile, Chicago Black Hawks
Ted Lindsay, Detroit Red Wings	LW	Gaye Stewart, Chicago Black Hawks

== Player statistics ==
=== Scoring leaders ===
GP = Games Played, G = Goals, A = Assists, Pts = Points

Player	Team	GP	G	A	Pts
Elmer Lach	Montreal Canadiens	60	30	31	61
Buddy O'Connor	New York Rangers	60	24	36	60
Doug Bentley	Chicago Black Hawks	60	20	37	57
Gaye Stewart	Toronto Maple Leafs / Chicago Black Hawks	61	27	29	56
Max Bentley	Black Hawks / Toronto Maple Leafs	59	26	28	54
Bud Poile	Toronto Maple Leafs / Chicago Black Hawks	58	25	29	54
Maurice Richard	Montreal Canadiens	53	28	25	53
Syl Apps	Toronto Maple Leafs	55	26	27	53
Ted Lindsay	Detroit Red Wings	60	33	19	52
Roy Conacher	Chicago Black Hawks	52	22	27	49

Source: NHL

=== Leading goaltenders ===
GP = Games Played, TOI = Time on ice (minutes), GA = Goals Against, SO = Shutouts, GAA = Goals against average

Player	Team	GP	TOI	GA	SO	GAA
Turk Broda	Toronto Maple Leafs	60	3600	143	5	2.38
Harry Lumley	Detroit Red Wings	60	3592	147	7	2.46
Bill Durnan	Montreal Canadiens	59	3505	162	5	2.77
Frank Brimsek	Boston Bruins	60	3600	168	3	2.80
Jim Henry	New York Rangers	48	2800	153	2	3.19
Emile Francis	Chicago Black Hawks	54	3240	183	1	3.39

== Coaches ==
- Boston Bruins: Dit Clapper
- Chicago Black Hawks: Johnny Gottselig
- Detroit Red Wings: Tommy Ivan
- Montreal Canadiens: Dick Irvin
- New York Rangers: Frank Boucher
- Toronto Maple Leafs: Hap Day

== Debuts ==
The following is a list of players of note who played their first NHL game in 1947–48 (listed with their first team):

- Ed Sandford, Boston Bruins
- Paul Ronty, Boston Bruins
- Metro Prystai, Chicago Black Hawks
- Marty Pavelich, Detroit Red Wings
- Red Kelly, Detroit Red Wings
- Floyd Curry, Montreal Canadiens
- Tom Johnson, Montreal Canadiens
- Gerry McNeil, Montreal Canadiens
- Doug Harvey, Montreal Canadiens
- Ed Kullman, New York Rangers
- Fleming MacKell, Toronto Maple Leafs
- Tod Sloan, Toronto Maple Leafs

== Last games ==
The following is a list of players of note that played their last game in the NHL in 1947–48 (listed with their last team):

- John Quilty, Boston Bruins
- John Mariucci, Chicago Black Hawks
- Toe Blake, Montreal Canadiens
- Bryan Hextall, New York Rangers
- Phil Watson, New York Rangers
- Billy Taylor, New York Rangers
- Syl Apps, Toronto Maple Leafs
- Nick Metz, Toronto Maple Leafs

== See also ==
- 1947–48 NHL transactions
- List of Stanley Cup champions
- 1st National Hockey League All-Star Game
- National Hockey League All-Star Game
- Ice hockey at the 1948 Winter Olympics
- 1947 in sports
- 1948 in sports
