= 1949–50 Montreal Canadiens season =

NHL hockey team season

1949–50 Montreal Canadiens
- League: 2nd NHL
- 1949–50 record: 29–22–19
- Home record: 17–8–10
- Road record: 12–14–9
- Goals for: 172
- Goals against: 150

Team information
- General manager: Frank J. Selke
- Coach: Dick Irvin
- Captain: Emile Bouchard
- Arena: Montreal Forum

Team leaders
- Goals: Maurice Richard (43)
- Assists: Elmer Lach (33)
- Points: Maurice Richard (65)
- Penalty minutes: Maurice Richard (114)
- Wins: Bill Durnan (26)
- Goals against average: Gerry McNeil (1.50)

The 1949–50 Montreal Canadiens season was the 41st season in club history. The team placed second in the regular season to qualify for the playoffs. The Canadiens lost in the semi-finals against New York Rangers four games to one.

== Regular season ==
=== Final standings ===
National Hockey League
| | | GP | W | L | T | GF | GA | DIFF | Pts |
|---|---|---|---|---|---|---|---|---|---|
| 1 | Detroit Red Wings | 70 | 37 | 19 | 14 | 229 | 164 | +65 | 88 |
| 2 | Montreal Canadiens | 70 | 29 | 22 | 19 | 172 | 150 | +22 | 77 |
| 3 | Toronto Maple Leafs | 70 | 31 | 27 | 12 | 176 | 173 | +3 | 74 |
| 4 | New York Rangers | 70 | 28 | 31 | 11 | 170 | 189 | −19 | 67 |
| 5 | Boston Bruins | 70 | 22 | 32 | 16 | 198 | 228 | −30 | 60 |
| 6 | Chicago Black Hawks | 70 | 22 | 38 | 10 | 203 | 244 | −41 | 54 |

=== Record vs. opponents ===
1949–50 NHL Records
| Team | BOS | CHI | DET | MTL | NYR | TOR |
|---|---|---|---|---|---|---|
| Boston | — | 5–7–2 | 3–8–3 | 4–5–5 | 5–5–4 | 5–7–2 |
| Chicago | 7–5–2 | — | 3–9–2 | 4–8–2 | 4–9–1 | 4–7–3 |
| Detroit | 8–3–3 | 9–3–2 | — | 5–3–6 | 7–5–2 | 8–5–1 |
| Montreal | 5–4–5 | 8–4–2 | 3–5–6 | — | 7–5–2 | 6–4–4 |
| New York | 5–5–4 | 9–4–1 | 5–7–2 | 5–7–2 | — | 4–8–2 |
| Toronto | 7–5–2 | 7–4–3 | 5–8–1 | 4–6–4 | 8–4–2 | — |

== Schedule and results ==
1949–50 regular season
October

| Game | Result | Date | Score | Opponent | Record |
|---|---|---|---|---|---|
| 1 | W | October 13, 1949 | 4–0 | Chicago Black Hawks (1949–50) | 1–0–0 |
| 2 | W | October 15, 1949 | 3–1 | New York Rangers (1949–50) | 2–0–0 |
| 3 | W | October 19, 1949 | 3–1 | @ Toronto Maple Leafs (1949–50) | 3–0–0 |
| 4 | L | October 22, 1949 | 1–2 | Boston Bruins (1949–50) | 3–1–0 |
| 5 | T | October 23, 1949 | 0–0 | @ Boston Bruins (1949–50) | 3–1–1 |
| 6 | L | October 27, 1949 | 0–2 | Toronto Maple Leafs (1949–50) | 3–2–1 |
| 7 | L | October 29, 1949 | 0–1 | Detroit Red Wings (1949–50) | 3–3–1 |
| 8 | W | October 30, 1949 | 4–1 | @ Detroit Red Wings (1949–50) | 4–3–1 |

November

| Game | Result | Date | Score | Opponent | Record |
|---|---|---|---|---|---|
| 9 | L | November 2, 1949 | 1–4 | @ Chicago Black Hawks (1949–50) | 4–4–1 |
| 10 | T | November 5, 1949 | 3–3 | Boston Bruins (1949–50) | 4–4–2 |
| 11 | T | November 9, 1949 | 2–2 | @ New York Rangers (1949–50) | 4–4–3 |
| 12 | W | November 10, 1949 | 4–2 | Toronto Maple Leafs (1949–50) | 5–4–3 |
| 13 | W | November 12, 1949 | 5–3 | @ New York Rangers (1949–50) | 6–4–3 |
| 14 | T | November 13, 1949 | 0–0 | @ Chicago Black Hawks (1949–50) | 6–4–4 |
| 15 | L | November 16, 1949 | 0–1 | @ Toronto Maple Leafs (1949–50) | 6–5–4 |
| 16 | L | November 20, 1949 | 1–2 | @ Boston Bruins (1949–50) | 6–6–4 |
| 17 | W | November 24, 1949 | 5–3 | Toronto Maple Leafs (1949–50) | 7–6–4 |
| 18 | W | November 26, 1949 | 5–1 | New York Rangers (1949–50) | 8–6–4 |
| 19 | W | November 27, 1949 | 6–2 | @ Detroit Red Wings (1949–50) | 9–6–4 |
| 20 | L | November 30, 1949 | 2–5 | @ New York Rangers (1949–50) | 9–7–4 |

December

| Game | Result | Date | Score | Opponent | Record |
|---|---|---|---|---|---|
| 21 | L | December 3, 1949 | 3–5 | Detroit Red Wings (1949–50) | 9–8–4 |
| 22 | L | December 4, 1949 | 2–4 | @ Boston Bruins (1949–50) | 9–9–4 |
| 23 | T | December 8, 1949 | 2–2 | Boston Bruins (1949–50) | 9–9–5 |
| 24 | T | December 10, 1949 | 1–1 | Chicago Black Hawks (1949–50) | 9–9–6 |
| 25 | W | December 11, 1949 | 3–0 | @ Chicago Black Hawks (1949–50) | 10–9–6 |
| 26 | T | December 14, 1949 | 2–2 | @ Toronto Maple Leafs (1949–50) | 10–9–7 |
| 27 | W | December 15, 1949 | 4–1 | Toronto Maple Leafs (1949–50) | 11–9–7 |
| 28 | W | December 17, 1949 | 4–3 | Detroit Red Wings (1949–50) | 12–9–7 |
| 29 | L | December 18, 1949 | 1–3 | @ Boston Bruins (1949–50) | 12–10–7 |
| 30 | L | December 21, 1949 | 1–4 | @ New York Rangers (1949–50) | 12–11–7 |
| 31 | T | December 24, 1949 | 0–0 | New York Rangers (1949–50) | 12–11–8 |
| 32 | L | December 25, 1949 | 2–4 | @ Detroit Red Wings (1949–50) | 12–12–8 |
| 33 | T | December 28, 1949 | 1–1 | @ Toronto Maple Leafs (1949–50) | 12–12–9 |
| 34 | W | December 31, 1949 | 3–2 | Chicago Black Hawks (1949–50) | 13–12–9 |

January

| Game | Result | Date | Score | Opponent | Record |
|---|---|---|---|---|---|
| 35 | L | January 1, 1950 | 1–5 | @ Chicago Black Hawks (1949–50) | 13–13–9 |
| 36 | W | January 5, 1950 | 5–3 | Boston Bruins (1949–50) | 14–13–9 |
| 37 | L | January 7, 1950 | 1–3 | New York Rangers (1949–50) | 14–14–9 |
| 38 | W | January 10, 1950 | 7–3 | @ Chicago Black Hawks (1949–50) | 15–14–9 |
| 39 | W | January 14, 1950 | 3–0 | Chicago Black Hawks (1949–50) | 16–14–9 |
| 40 | W | January 18, 1950 | 1–0 | @ Toronto Maple Leafs (1949–50) | 17–14–9 |
| 41 | L | January 19, 1950 | 2–4 | Toronto Maple Leafs (1949–50) | 17–15–9 |
| 42 | W | January 21, 1950 | 3–1 | Boston Bruins (1949–50) | 18–15–9 |
| 43 | W | January 22, 1950 | 5–4 | @ Boston Bruins (1949–50) | 19–15–9 |
| 44 | T | January 26, 1950 | 1–1 | Detroit Red Wings (1949–50) | 19–15–10 |
| 45 | T | January 28, 1950 | 1–1 | Detroit Red Wings (1949–50) | 19–15–11 |
| 46 | L | January 29, 1950 | 0–2 | @ New York Rangers (1949–50) | 19–16–11 |

February

| Game | Result | Date | Score | Opponent | Record |
|---|---|---|---|---|---|
| 47 | T | February 1, 1950 | 3–3 | @ Detroit Red Wings (1949–50) | 19–16–12 |
| 48 | W | February 2, 1950 | 4–1 | New York Rangers (1949–50) | 20–16–12 |
| 49 | L | February 4, 1950 | 2–6 | Chicago Black Hawks (1949–50) | 20–17–12 |
| 50 | W | February 5, 1950 | 4–3 | @ Chicago Black Hawks (1949–50) | 21–17–12 |
| 51 | L | February 11, 1950 | 0–2 | @ Toronto Maple Leafs (1949–50) | 21–18–12 |
| 52 | T | February 12, 1950 | 3–3 | @ Boston Bruins (1949–50) | 21–18–13 |
| 53 | T | February 16, 1950 | 3–3 | Toronto Maple Leafs (1949–50) | 21–18–14 |
| 54 | L | February 18, 1950 | 2–4 | New York Rangers (1949–50) | 21–19–14 |
| 55 | L | February 20, 1950 | 0–2 | @ Detroit Red Wings (1949–50) | 21–20–14 |
| 56 | T | February 23, 1950 | 1–1 | Detroit Red Wings (1949–50) | 21–20–15 |
| 57 | W | February 25, 1950 | 3–2 | Boston Bruins (1949–50) | 22–20–15 |

March

| Game | Result | Date | Score | Opponent | Record |
|---|---|---|---|---|---|
| 58 | L | March 2, 1950 | 2–5 | @ Chicago Black Hawks (1949–50) | 22–21–15 |
| 59 | W | March 4, 1950 | 3–1 | Chicago Black Hawks (1949–50) | 23–21–15 |
| 60 | T | March 6, 1950 | 2–2 | @ Detroit Red Wings (1949–50) | 23–21–16 |
| 61 | T | March 9, 1950 | 1–1 | Toronto Maple Leafs (1949–50) | 23–21–17 |
| 62 | W | March 11, 1950 | 5–0 | Boston Bruins (1949–50) | 24–21–17 |
| 63 | W | March 12, 1950 | 5–1 | @ New York Rangers (1949–50) | 25–21–17 |
| 64 | L | March 15, 1950 | 1–4 | @ Detroit Red Wings (1949–50) | 25–22–17 |
| 65 | T | March 16, 1950 | 2–2 | Detroit Red Wings (1949–50) | 25–22–18 |
| 66 | W | March 18, 1950 | 5–3 | New York Rangers (1949–50) | 26–22–18 |
| 67 | W | March 19, 1950 | 4–2 | @ New York Rangers (1949–50) | 27–22–18 |
| 68 | W | March 22, 1950 | 2–1 | @ Toronto Maple Leafs (1949–50) | 28–22–18 |
| 69 | W | March 25, 1950 | 4–0 | Chicago Black Hawks (1949–50) | 29–22–18 |
| 70 | T | March 26, 1950 | 3–3 | @ Boston Bruins (1949–50) | 29–22–19 |

Legend: Win (2 points) Loss (0 points) Tie (1 point)

== Player statistics ==
=== Regular season ===
==== Scoring ====
| Player | Pos | GP | G | A | Pts | PIM |
|---|---|---|---|---|---|---|
| Maurice Richard | RW | 70 | 43 | 22 | 65 | 114 |
| Elmer Lach | C | 64 | 15 | 33 | 48 | 33 |
| Billy Reay | C | 68 | 19 | 26 | 45 | 48 |
| Norm Dussault | C | 67 | 13 | 24 | 37 | 22 |
| Leo Gravelle | RW | 70 | 19 | 10 | 29 | 18 |
| Ken Reardon | D | 67 | 1 | 27 | 28 | 109 |
| Ken Mosdell | C | 67 | 15 | 12 | 27 | 42 |
| Doug Harvey | D | 70 | 4 | 20 | 24 | 76 |
| Rip Riopelle | LW | 66 | 12 | 8 | 20 | 27 |
| Glen Harmon | D | 62 | 3 | 16 | 19 | 28 |
| Calum MacKay | LW | 52 | 8 | 10 | 18 | 44 |
| Floyd Curry | RW | 49 | 8 | 8 | 16 | 8 |
| Roger Leger | D | 55 | 3 | 12 | 15 | 21 |
| Grant Warwick | RW | 26 | 2 | 6 | 8 | 19 |
| Emile Bouchard | D | 69 | 1 | 7 | 8 | 88 |
| Gerry Plamondon | LW | 37 | 1 | 5 | 6 | 0 |
| Bob Fillion | LW | 57 | 1 | 3 | 4 | 8 |
| Gilles Dube | LW | 12 | 1 | 2 | 3 | 2 |
| Bert Hirschfeld | LW | 13 | 1 | 2 | 3 | 2 |
| Joe Carveth | RW | 11 | 1 | 1 | 2 | 2 |
| Hal Laycoe | D | 30 | 0 | 2 | 2 | 21 |
| Bob Fryday | RW | 2 | 1 | 0 | 1 | 0 |
| Lulu Denis | RW | 2 | 0 | 1 | 1 | 0 |
| Bill Durnan | G | 64 | 0 | 1 | 1 | 2 |
| Bob Frampton | LW | 2 | 0 | 0 | 0 | 0 |
| Gerry McNeil | G | 6 | 0 | 0 | 0 | 0 |

==== Goaltending ====
| Player | MIN | GP | W | L | T | GA | GAA | SO |
|---|---|---|---|---|---|---|---|---|
| Bill Durnan | 3840 | 64 | 26 | 21 | 17 | 141 | 2.20 | 8 |
| Gerry McNeil | 360 | 6 | 3 | 1 | 2 | 9 | 1.50 | 1 |
| Team: | 4200 | 70 | 29 | 22 | 19 | 150 | 2.14 | 9 |

=== Playoffs ===
==== Scoring ====
| Player | Pos | GP | G | A | Pts | PIM |
|---|---|---|---|---|---|---|
| Norm Dussault | C | 5 | 3 | 1 | 4 | 0 |
| Elmer Lach | C | 5 | 1 | 2 | 3 | 4 |
| Maurice Richard | RW | 5 | 1 | 1 | 2 | 6 |
| Emile Bouchard | D | 5 | 0 | 2 | 2 | 2 |
| Doug Harvey | D | 5 | 0 | 2 | 2 | 10 |
| Ken Reardon | D | 2 | 0 | 2 | 2 | 12 |
| Floyd Curry | RW | 5 | 1 | 0 | 1 | 2 |
| Bert Hirschfeld | LW | 5 | 1 | 0 | 1 | 0 |
| Glen Harmon | D | 5 | 0 | 1 | 1 | 21 |
| Calum MacKay | LW | 5 | 0 | 1 | 1 | 2 |
| Gerry Plamondon | LW | 3 | 0 | 1 | 1 | 2 |
| Billy Reay | C | 4 | 0 | 1 | 1 | 0 |
| Bill Durnan | G | 3 | 0 | 0 | 0 | 0 |
| Bob Fillion | LW | 5 | 0 | 0 | 0 | 0 |
| Bob Frampton | LW | 3 | 0 | 0 | 0 | 0 |
| Leo Gravelle | RW | 4 | 0 | 0 | 0 | 0 |
| Tom Johnson | D | 1 | 0 | 0 | 0 | 0 |
| Hal Laycoe | D | 2 | 0 | 0 | 0 | 0 |
| Roger Leger | D | 4 | 0 | 0 | 0 | 2 |
| Gerry McNeil | G | 2 | 0 | 0 | 0 | 0 |
| Paul Meger | LW | 2 | 0 | 0 | 0 | 2 |
| Ken Mosdell | C | 5 | 0 | 0 | 0 | 12 |
| Rip Riopelle | LW | 1 | 0 | 0 | 0 | 0 |

==== Goaltending ====
| Player | MIN | GP | W | L | GA | GAA | SO |
|---|---|---|---|---|---|---|---|
| Gerry McNeil | 135 | 2 | 1 | 1 | 5 | 2.22 | 0 |
| Bill Durnan | 180 | 3 | 0 | 3 | 10 | 3.33 | 0 |
| Team: | 315 | 5 | 1 | 4 | 15 | 2.86 | 0 |

Note:

Pos = Position;GP = Games played; G = Goals; A = Assists; Pts = Points; PIM = Penalty minutes; +/- = Plus/minus; PPG = Power-play goals; SHG = Short-handed goals; GWG = Game-winning goals
Pos = Position;GP = Games played; Min, TOI = Minutes played; W = Wins; L = Losses; T,T/OT = Ties; OTL = Overtime losses; GA = Goals-against; GAA = Goals-against average; SO = Shutouts; SA = Shots against; SV = Shots saved;SV% = Save percentage;

== Awards and records ==
- Vezina Trophy: Bill Durnan

== See also ==
- 1949–50 NHL season
