= 1949–50 New York Rangers season =

NHL hockey team season

1949–50 New York Rangers
- League: 4th NHL
- 1949–50 record: 28–31–11
- Home record: 19–12–4
- Road record: 9–19–7
- Goals for: 170
- Goals against: 189

Team information
- General manager: Frank Boucher
- Coach: Lynn Patrick
- Captain: Buddy O'Connor
- Arena: Madison Square Garden

Team leaders
- Goals: Edgar Laprade (22)
- Assists: Tony Leswick and Don Raleigh (25)
- Points: Edgar Laprade and Tony Leswick (44)
- Penalty minutes: Gus Kyle (143)
- Wins: Chuck Rayner (28)
- Goals against average: Chuck Rayner (2.62)

The 1949–50 New York Rangers season was the franchise's 24th season. The season saw the Rangers finish in fourth place in the National Hockey League (NHL) with a record of 28 wins, 31 losses, and 11 ties for 67 points. They upset the Montreal Canadiens in five games in the Semi-finals before losing a close seven-game Stanley Cup Final to the Detroit Red Wings. The team reached double-overtime of the seventh game of the Finals before Detroit's Pete Babando scored to give the Red Wings the Cup. The Rangers would not win another playoff series again until 1971.

Also of note during this season was that the Rangers were forced to use Maple Leaf Gardens in Toronto, the home ice of the Toronto Maple Leafs, as their "home ice" during the Stanley Cup Finals, as the Ringling Brothers Barnum and Bailey Circus was then at Madison Square Garden. Garden management found that they could make more money having the circus at the Garden instead of the Rangers. Moreover, at the time, arenas could not be configured to host a circus and a hockey game on the same day, thus forcing the shift in venue.

The Rangers would not reach the Stanley Cup Final again until 1972.

== Regular season ==
=== Final standings ===
National Hockey League
		GP	W	L	T	GF	GA	DIFF	Pts
1	Detroit Red Wings	70	37	19	14	229	164	+65	88
2	Montreal Canadiens	70	29	22	19	172	150	+22	77
3	Toronto Maple Leafs	70	31	27	12	176	173	+3	74
4	New York Rangers	70	28	31	11	170	189	−19	67
5	Boston Bruins	70	22	32	16	198	228	−30	60
6	Chicago Black Hawks	70	22	38	10	203	244	−41	54

=== Record vs. opponents ===
1949–50 NHL Records
Team	BOS	CHI	DET	MTL	NYR	TOR
Boston	—	5–7–2	3–8–3	4–5–5	5–5–4	5–7–2
Chicago	7–5–2	—	3–9–2	4–8–2	4–9–1	4–7–3
Detroit	8–3–3	9–3–2	—	5–3–6	7–5–2	8–5–1
Montreal	5–4–5	8–4–2	3–5–6	—	7–5–2	6–4–4
New York	5–5–4	9–4–1	5–7–2	5–7–2	—	4–8–2
Toronto	7–5–2	7–4–3	5–8–1	4–6–4	8–4–2	—

== Schedule and results ==
1949–50 regular season
October: 2–4–2 (home: 1–2–0; road: 1–2–2)

Game	October	Opponent	Score	Record
1	15	@ Montreal Canadiens	3–1	0–1–0
2	16	@ Boston Bruins	2–2	0–1–1
3	19	@ Detroit Red Wings	6–1	0–2–1
4	22	@ Toronto Maple Leafs	2–2	0–2–2
5	25	@ Chicago Black Hawks	2–1	1–2–2
6	26	Boston Bruins	5–2	2–2–2
7	29	Chicago Black Hawks	2–0	2–3–2
8	30	Toronto Maple Leafs	4–2	2–4–2

November: 3–4–4 (home: 2–2–2; road: 1–2–2)

Game	November	Opponent	Score	Record
9	2	@ Toronto Maple Leafs	3–3	2–4–3
10	6	@ Detroit Red Wings	7–0	2–5–3
11	9	Montreal Canadiens	2–2	2–5–4
12	12	Montreal Canadiens	5–3	2–6–4
13	13	Detroit Red Wings	1–1	2–6–5
14	16	Boston Bruins	2–1	3–6–5
15	20	@ Chicago Black Hawks	5–2	4–6–5
16	23	@ Detroit Red Wings	4–3	4–7–5
17	26	@ Montreal Canadiens	5–1	4–8–5
18	27	@ Boston Bruins	1–1	4–8–6
19	30	Montreal Canadiens	5–2	5–8–6

December: 9–3–1 (home: 7–1–0; road: 2–2–1)

Game	December	Opponent	Score	Record
20	3	@ Toronto Maple Leafs	2–0	5–9–6
21	4	Chicago Black Hawks	4–0	6–9–6
22	7	Chicago Black Hawks	2–1	7–9–6
23	10	@ Detroit Red Wings	1–0	8–9–6
24	11	Detroit Red Wings	2–1	9–9–6
25	14	@ Chicago Black Hawks	5–3	9–10–6
26	17	@ Boston Bruins	3–1	10–10–6
27	18	Toronto Maple Leafs	2–0	10–11–6
28	21	Montreal Canadiens	4–1	11–11–6
29	24	@ Montreal Canadiens	0–0	11–11–7
30	25	Toronto Maple Leafs	3–1	12–11–7
31	28	Chicago Black Hawks	5–2	13–11–7
32	31	Boston Bruins	4–1	14–11–7

January: 3–8–2 (home: 2–3–1; road: 1–5–1)

Game	January	Opponent	Score	Record
33	1	@ Boston Bruins	6–0	14–12–7
34	4	Detroit Red Wings	2–1	15–12–7
35	7	@ Montreal Canadiens	3–1	16–12–7
36	8	Chicago Black Hawks	1–1	16–12–8
37	11	Toronto Maple Leafs	2–1	16–13–8
38	14	@ Detroit Red Wings	4–2	16–14–8
39	15	Detroit Red Wings	1–0	16–15–8
40	18	Boston Bruins	4–2	16–16–8
41	21	@ Toronto Maple Leafs	2–1	16–17–8
42	22	@ Chicago Black Hawks	4–3	16–18–8
43	25	@ Toronto Maple Leafs	5–1	16–19–8
44	28	@ Boston Bruins	2–2	16–19–9
45	29	Montreal Canadiens	2–0	17–19–9

February: 7–3–2 (home: 4–0–1; road: 3–3–1)

Game	February	Opponent	Score	Record
46	1	@ Boston Bruins	3–2	17–20–9
47	2	@ Montreal Canadiens	4–1	17–21–9
48	5	@ Detroit Red Wings	5–5	17–21–10
49	9	@ Chicago Black Hawks	5–3	18–21–10
50	12	Detroit Red Wings	4–0	19–21–10
51	15	Boston Bruins	2–2	19–21–11
52	18	@ Montreal Canadiens	4–2	20–21–11
53	19	Toronto Maple Leafs	2–1	21–21–11
54	22	Chicago Black Hawks	3–0	22–21–11
55	23	@ Chicago Black Hawks	7–3	23–21–11
56	25	@ Toronto Maple Leafs	4–2	23–22–11
57	26	Boston Bruins	4–3	24–22–11

March: 4–9–0 (home: 3–5–0; road: 1–4–0)

Game	March	Opponent	Score	Record
58	1	Detroit Red Wings	5–2	24–23–11
59	4	@ Boston Bruins	5–1	24–24–11
60	5	Toronto Maple Leafs	5–2	25–24–11
61	8	@ Chicago Black Hawks	4–2	26–24–11
62	9	Detroit Red Wings	3–1	27–24–11
63	11	@ Toronto Maple Leafs	4–0	27–25–11
64	12	Montreal Canadiens	5–1	27–26–11
65	15	Boston Bruins	4–1	27–27–11
66	18	@ Montreal Canadiens	5–3	27–28–11
67	19	Montreal Canadiens	4–2	27–29–11
68	21	Chicago Black Hawks	6–3	27–30–11
69	22	@ Detroit Red Wings	8–7	27–31–11
70	26	Toronto Maple Leafs	5–3	28–31–11

Legend: Win (2 points) Loss (0 points) Tie (1 point)

== Playoffs ==
=== Stanley Cup Final ===
It was the Rangers' first appearance in the Final since their Stanley Cup victory in 1940. Two games were played in Toronto as the circus had taken over Madison Square Garden in New York. New York's Don Raleigh scored two overtime winners and Detroit's Pete Babando scored the Cup-winning goal in overtime of game seven, the first time ever in which the stanley cup was won in extra frames in game seven. Detroit won the Cup without Gordie Howe, who was injured in the first game of the playoffs. As Stanley Cup runner-up, the Rangers would be awarded the O'Brien Cup, the last team to win the trophy, at one time the National Hockey Association championship trophy, which was retired after the season.

1950 Stanley Cup playoffs
Semifinals vs. (2) Montreal Canadiens – New York wins 4–1

Game	Date	Visitor	Score	Home	OT	Series
1	March 29	Montreal Canadiens	1–3	New York Rangers		New York Rangers lead series 1–0
2	April 1	New York Rangers	3–2	Montreal Canadiens		New York Rangers lead series 2–0
3	April 2	Montreal Canadiens	1–4	New York Rangers		New York Rangers lead series 3–0
4	April 4	New York Rangers	2–3	Montreal Canadiens	OT	New York Rangers lead series 3–1
5	April 6	New York Rangers	3–0	Montreal Canadiens		New York Rangers win series 4–1

Stanley Cup Finals vs. (1) Detroit Red Wings – Detroit wins 4–3

Game	Date	Visitor	Score	Home	OT	Series
1	April 11	New York Rangers	1–4	Detroit Red Wings		Detroit leads series 1–0
2	April 13 (in Toronto)	Detroit Red Wings	1–3	New York Rangers		Series tied 1–1
3	April 15 (in Toronto, Ontario)	Detroit Red Wings	4–0	New York Rangers		Detroit leads series 2–1
4	April 18	New York Rangers	4–3	Detroit Red Wings	OT	Series tied 2–2
5	April 20	New York Rangers	2–1	Detroit Red Wings	OT	New York Rangers lead series 3–2
6	April 22	New York Rangers	4–5	Detroit Red Wings		Series tied 3–3
7	April 23	New York Rangers	3–4	Detroit Red Wings	OT	Detroit wins series 4–3

Legend: Win Loss

== Player statistics ==
Skaters

Regular season
Player	GP	G	A	Pts	PIM
Edgar Laprade	60	22	22	44	2
Tony Leswick	69	19	25	44	85
Ed Slowinski	63	14	23	37	12
Don Raleigh	70	12	25	37	11
Dunc Fisher	70	12	21	33	42
Herbert O'Connor	66	11	22	33	4
Alex Kaleta	67	17	14	31	40
Pentti Lund	64	18	9	27	16
Nick Mickoski	47	10	10	20	10
Pat Egan	70	5	11	16	50
Jackie McLeod	38	6	9	15	2
Fred Shero	67	2	8	10	71
Norman Poile^{‡}	28	3	6	9	8
Allan Stanley	55	4	4	8	58
Walter Kyle	70	3	5	8	143
Frank Eddolls	58	2	6	8	20
Jean Lamirande	16	4	3	7	6
Jack Lancien	43	1	4	5	27
Winston Juckes	14	2	1	3	6
Norman Lowe	3	1	1	2	0
Don Smith	10	1	1	2	0
Wally Stanowski	37	1	1	2	10
Sherman White	3	0	2	2	0
Jean-Paul Denis	4	0	1	1	2
Doug Adam	4	0	1	1	0
Fern Perreault	1	0	0	0	0
Jack Gordon	1	0	0	0	0
Bill Kyle	2	0	0	0	0
Jack Evans	3	0	0	0	2
Bill McDonagh	4	0	0	0	2
John Webster	14	0	0	0	4

Playoffs
Player	GP	G	A	Pts	PIM
Pentti Lund	12	6	5	11	0
Don Raleigh	12	4	5	9	4
Edgar Laprade	12	3	5	8	4
Ed Slowinski	12	2	6	8	6
Allan Stanley	12	2	5	7	10
Herbert O'Connor	12	4	2	6	4
Dunc Fisher	12	3	3	6	14
Tony Leswick	12	2	4	6	12
Nick Mickoski	12	1	5	6	2
Pat Egan	12	3	1	4	6
Walter Kyle	12	1	2	3	30
Alex Kaleta	10	0	3	3	0
Jack Gordon	9	1	1	2	7
Frank Eddolls	11	0	1	1	4
Jack Lancien	4	0	1	1	0
Fred Shero	7	0	1	1	2
Jean Lamirande	2	0	0	0	0
Jackie McLeod	7	0	0	0	0
Don Smith	1	0	0	0	0

Goaltenders

Regular season
Player	GP	TOI	W	L	T	GA	GAA	SO
Chuck Rayner	69	4140	28	30	11	181	2.62	6
Emile Francis	1	60	0	1	0	8	8.00	0

Playoffs
Player	GP	TOI	W	L	GA	GAA	SO
Chuck Rayner	12	775	7	5	29	2.25	1

^{†}Denotes player spent time with another team before joining Rangers. Stats reflect time with Rangers only.
^{‡}Traded mid-season. Stats reflect time with Rangers only.

Note:

Pos = Position;GP = Games played; G = Goals; A = Assists; Pts = Points; PIM = Penalty minutes; +/- = Plus/minus; PPG = Power-play goals; SHG = Short-handed goals; GWG = Game-winning goals
Pos = Position;GP = Games played; Min, TOI = Minutes played; W = Wins; L = Losses; T,T/OT = Ties; OTL = Overtime losses; GA = Goals-against; GAA = Goals-against average; SO = Shutouts; SA = Shots against; SV = Shots saved;SV% = Save percentage;

== Awards and records ==
- O'Brien Cup: New York Rangers
- Hart Memorial Trophy: Chuck Rayner
- Lady Byng Memorial Trophy: Edgar Laprade
- Tony Leswick, Left Wing, NHL Second Team All-Star
- Chuck Rayner, Goaltender, NHL Second Team All-Star
