= 1949–50 Boston Bruins season =

NHL team season

1949–50 Boston Bruins
- League: 5th NHL
- 1949–50 record: 22–32–16
- Home record: 15–12–8
- Road record: 7–20–8
- Goals for: 198
- Goals against: 228

Team information
- General manager: Art Ross
- Coach: Georges Boucher
- Captain: Milt Schmidt
- Arena: Boston Garden

Team leaders
- Goals: Johnny Peirson (27)
- Assists: Paul Ronty (36)
- Points: Paul Ronty (59)
- Penalty minutes: Fern Flaman (122)
- Wins: Jack Gelineau (22)
- Goals against average: Jack Gelineau (3.28)

The 1949–50 Boston Bruins season was the Bruins' 26th season in the NHL the Bruins missed the playoffs for the first time since the 1943–44 season.

== Regular season ==
=== Final standings ===
National Hockey League
		GP	W	L	T	GF	GA	DIFF	Pts
1	Detroit Red Wings	70	37	19	14	229	164	+65	88
2	Montreal Canadiens	70	29	22	19	172	150	+22	77
3	Toronto Maple Leafs	70	31	27	12	176	173	+3	74
4	New York Rangers	70	28	31	11	170	189	−19	67
5	Boston Bruins	70	22	32	16	198	228	−30	60
6	Chicago Black Hawks	70	22	38	10	203	244	−41	54

=== Record vs. opponents ===
1949–50 NHL Records
Team	BOS	CHI	DET	MTL	NYR	TOR
Boston	—	5–7–2	3–8–3	4–5–5	5–5–4	5–7–2
Chicago	7–5–2	—	3–9–2	4–8–2	4–9–1	4–7–3
Detroit	8–3–3	9–3–2	—	5–3–6	7–5–2	8–5–1
Montreal	5–4–5	8–4–2	3–5–6	—	7–5–2	6–4–4
New York	5–5–4	9–4–1	5–7–2	5–7–2	—	4–8–2
Toronto	7–5–2	7–4–3	5–8–1	4–6–4	8–4–2	—

== Schedule and results ==
1949–50 regular season
October

Game	Result	Date	Score	Opponent	Record
1	L	October 12, 1949	1–2	@ Detroit Red Wings (1949–50)	0–1–0
2	T	October 16, 1949	2–2	New York Rangers (1949–50)	0–1–1
3	W	October 19, 1949	7–4	Chicago Black Hawks (1949–50)	1–1–1
4	W	October 22, 1949	2–1	@ Montreal Canadiens (1949–50)	2–1–1
5	T	October 23, 1949	0–0	Montreal Canadiens (1949–50)	2–1–2
6	L	October 26, 1949	2–5	@ New York Rangers (1949–50)	2–2–2
7	L	October 29, 1949	1–8	@ Toronto Maple Leafs (1949–50)	2–3–2
8	L	October 30, 1949	4–10	@ Chicago Black Hawks (1949–50)	2–4–2

November

Game	Result	Date	Score	Opponent	Record
9	L	November 2, 1949	3–5	@ Detroit Red Wings (1949–50)	2–5–2
10	T	November 5, 1949	3–3	@ Montreal Canadiens (1949–50)	2–5–3
11	L	November 9, 1949	1–3	Chicago Black Hawks (1949–50)	2–6–3
12	L	November 12, 1949	5–7	Detroit Red Wings (1949–50)	2–7–3
13	W	November 13, 1949	4–2	Toronto Maple Leafs (1949–50)	3–7–3
14	L	November 16, 1949	1–2	@ New York Rangers (1949–50)	3–8–3
15	L	November 17, 1949	3–8	@ Chicago Black Hawks (1949–50)	3–9–3
16	W	November 20, 1949	2–1	Montreal Canadiens (1949–50)	4–9–3
17	W	November 23, 1949	3–1	Toronto Maple Leafs (1949–50)	5–9–3
18	T	November 26, 1949	3–3	@ Toronto Maple Leafs (1949–50)	5–9–4
19	T	November 27, 1949	1–1	New York Rangers (1949–50)	5–9–5
20	L	November 30, 1949	0–3	@ Detroit Red Wings (1949–50)	5–10–5

December

Game	Result	Date	Score	Opponent	Record
21	L	December 1, 1949	4–5	@ Chicago Black Hawks (1949–50)	5–11–5
22	W	December 3, 1949	5–3	Chicago Black Hawks (1949–50)	6–11–5
23	W	December 4, 1949	4–2	Montreal Canadiens (1949–50)	7–11–5
24	L	December 7, 1949	1–2	Detroit Red Wings (1949–50)	7–12–5
25	T	December 8, 1949	2–2	@ Montreal Canadiens (1949–50)	7–12–6
26	L	December 10, 1949	1–2	@ Toronto Maple Leafs (1949–50)	7–13–6
27	W	December 11, 1949	2–0	Toronto Maple Leafs (1949–50)	8–13–6
28	L	December 14, 1949	2–5	Detroit Red Wings (1949–50)	8–14–6
29	L	December 17, 1949	1–3	New York Rangers (1949–50)	8–15–6
30	W	December 18, 1949	3–1	Montreal Canadiens (1949–50)	9–15–6
31	W	December 21, 1949	4–1	@ Chicago Black Hawks (1949–50)	10–15–6
32	W	December 24, 1949	8–4	@ Toronto Maple Leafs (1949–50)	11–15–6
33	T	December 25, 1949	4–4	Chicago Black Hawks (1949–50)	11–15–7
34	T	December 28, 1949	2–2	@ Detroit Red Wings (1949–50)	11–15–8
35	L	December 31, 1949	1–4	@ New York Rangers (1949–50)	11–16–8

January

Game	Result	Date	Score	Opponent	Record
36	W	January 1, 1950	6–0	New York Rangers (1949–50)	12–16–8
37	L	January 5, 1950	3–5	@ Montreal Canadiens (1949–50)	12–17–8
38	W	January 8, 1950	4–3	@ Detroit Red Wings (1949–50)	13–17–8
39	W	January 11, 1950	2–1	Detroit Red Wings (1949–50)	14–17–8
40	L	January 14, 1950	3–4	@ Toronto Maple Leafs (1949–50)	14–18–8
41	L	January 15, 1950	1–5	Chicago Black Hawks (1949–50)	14–19–8
42	W	January 18, 1950	4–2	@ New York Rangers (1949–50)	15–19–8
43	L	January 21, 1950	1–3	@ Montreal Canadiens (1949–50)	15–20–8
44	L	January 22, 1950	4–5	Montreal Canadiens (1949–50)	15–21–8
45	T	January 25, 1950	4–4	@ Detroit Red Wings (1949–50)	15–21–9
46	L	January 26, 1950	1–5	@ Chicago Black Hawks (1949–50)	15–22–9
47	T	January 28, 1950	2–2	New York Rangers (1949–50)	15–22–10
48	W	January 29, 1950	4–1	Detroit Red Wings (1949–50)	16–22–10

February

Game	Result	Date	Score	Opponent	Record
49	W	February 1, 1950	3–2	New York Rangers (1949–50)	17–22–10
50	L	February 5, 1950	1–2	Toronto Maple Leafs (1949–50)	17–23–10
51	L	February 8, 1950	1–3	Toronto Maple Leafs (1949–50)	17–24–10
52	L	February 11, 1950	4–9	Detroit Red Wings (1949–50)	17–25–10
53	T	February 12, 1950	3–3	Montreal Canadiens (1949–50)	17–25–11
54	T	February 15, 1950	2–2	@ New York Rangers (1949–50)	17–25–12
55	T	February 19, 1950	4–4	@ Chicago Black Hawks (1949–50)	17–25–13
56	L	February 22, 1950	1–3	@ Toronto Maple Leafs (1949–50)	17–26–13
57	L	February 25, 1950	2–3	@ Montreal Canadiens (1949–50)	17–27–13
58	L	February 26, 1950	3–4	@ New York Rangers (1949–50)	17–28–13

March

Game	Result	Date	Score	Opponent	Record
59	W	March 1, 1950	5–2	Toronto Maple Leafs (1949–50)	18–28–13
60	W	March 4, 1950	5–1	New York Rangers (1949–50)	19–28–13
61	W	March 5, 1950	11–4	Chicago Black Hawks (1949–50)	20–28–13
62	L	March 8, 1950	3–5	Detroit Red Wings (1949–50)	20–29–13
63	L	March 11, 1950	0–5	@ Montreal Canadiens (1949–50)	20–30–13
64	T	March 12, 1950	2–2	Toronto Maple Leafs (1949–50)	20–30–14
65	W	March 15, 1950	4–1	@ New York Rangers (1949–50)	21–30–14
66	T	March 18, 1950	1–1	@ Detroit Red Wings (1949–50)	21–30–15
67	W	March 19, 1950	4–3	@ Chicago Black Hawks (1949–50)	22–30–15
68	L	March 22, 1950	5–7	Chicago Black Hawks (1949–50)	22–31–15
69	L	March 25, 1950	0–8	@ Toronto Maple Leafs (1949–50)	22–32–15
70	T	March 26, 1950	3–3	Montreal Canadiens (1949–50)	22–32–16

Legend: Win (2 points) Loss (0 points) Tie (1 point)

== Player statistics ==
=== Regular season ===
Scoring

Player	Pos	GP	G	A	Pts	PIM
Paul Ronty	C	70	23	36	59	8
Johnny Peirson	RW	57	27	25	52	49
Phil Maloney	C	70	15	31	46	6
Milt Schmidt	C/D	68	19	22	41	41
Ken Smith	LW	66	10	31	41	12
Woody Dumart	LW	69	14	25	39	14
Dave Creighton	C	64	18	13	31	13
Bud Poile	RW	39	16	14	30	6
Ed Harrison	C/LW	70	14	12	26	23
Bill Quackenbush	D	70	8	17	25	4
Sam Bettio	LW	44	9	12	21	32
Ed Kryzanowski	D	57	6	10	16	12
Murray Henderson	D	64	3	8	11	42
Pete Horeck	LW	34	5	5	10	22
Zellio Toppazzini	RW	36	5	5	10	18
Jack Crawford	D	46	2	8	10	8
Fern Flaman	D	69	2	5	7	122
Ed Sandford	LW	19	1	4	5	6
Lorne Ferguson	LW	3	1	1	2	0
Gord Byers	D	1	0	1	1	0
Arnie Kullman	C	12	0	1	1	11
Jack McIntyre	D	1	0	1	1	0
Red Sullivan	C	3	0	1	1	0
Dick Bittner	G	1	0	0	0	0
Bart Bradley	C	1	0	0	0	0
Norm Corcoran	C/RW	1	0	0	0	0
Jack Gelineau	G	67	0	0	0	0
Gord Henry	G	2	0	0	0	0
Ross Lowe	D/LW	3	0	0	0	0

Goaltending

Player	MIN	GP	W	L	T	GA	GAA	SO
Jack Gelineau	4020	67	22	30	15	220	3.28	3
Dick Bittner	60	1	0	0	1	3	3.00	0
Gord Henry	120	2	0	2	0	5	2.50	0
Team:	4200	70	22	32	16	228	3.26	3

Note:

Pos = Position;GP = Games played; G = Goals; A = Assists; Pts = Points; PIM = Penalty minutes; +/- = Plus/minus; PPG = Power-play goals; SHG = Short-handed goals; GWG = Game-winning goals
Pos = Position;GP = Games played; Min, TOI = Minutes played; W = Wins; L = Losses; T,T/OT = Ties; OTL = Overtime losses; GA = Goals-against; GAA = Goals-against average; SO = Shutouts; SA = Shots against; SV = Shots saved;SV% = Save percentage;

== See also ==
- 1949–50 NHL season
