= Dick Bittner =

American ice hockey player (1922–2002)

- Born: January 12, 1922 New Haven, Connecticut, U.S.
- Died: March 24, 2002 (aged 80) Columbus, Ohio, U.S.
- Height: 6 ft 0 in (183 cm)
- Weight: 170 lb (77 kg; 12 st 2 lb)
- Position: Goaltender
- Caught: Left
- Played for: Boston Bruins
- Playing career: 1943–1955; 1961–1963

Richard John Bittner (January 12, 1922 – March 24, 2002) was an American professional ice hockey goaltender who played in one National Hockey League game during the 1949–50 season. His lone game was with the Boston Bruins on February 12, 1950 against the Montreal Canadiens as a replacement for the injured Jack Gelineau. The rest of his career, which lasted from 1943 to 1955, was mainly spent in the amateur Eastern Amateur Hockey League. Internationally, Bittner played for the American national team at the 1949 World Championships.

== Career statistics ==
=== Regular season and playoffs ===
			Regular season								Playoffs
Season	Team	League	GP	W	L	T	Min	GA	SO	GAA	GP	W	L	T	Min	GA	SO	GAA
1943–44	New Haven Eagles	EAHL	12	1	11	0	700	68	0	5.83	—	—	—	—	—	—	—	—
1943–44	Brooklyn Crescents	EAHL	4	0	4	0	240	28	0	7.25	11	1	10	0	660	87	0	7.91
1944–45	Washington Lions	EAHL	12	3	8	1	720	53	0	4.42	4	0	4	0	240	29	0	7.11
1945–46	Washington Lions	EAHL	9	1	6	2	540	46	0	5.11	6	2	4	0	360	26	0	4.33
1946–47	San Francisco Shamrocks	PCHL	1	0	1	0	60	7	0	7.00	—	—	—	—	—	—	—	—
1947–48	Washington Lions	AHL	6	—	—	—	360	37	0	6.17	—	—	—	—	—	—	—	—
1947–48	Atlantic City Seagulls	EAHL	3	1	2	0	180	16	0	5.33	—	—	—	—	—	—	—	—
1949–50	Boston Bruins	NHL	1	0	0	1	60	3	0	3.00	—	—	—	—	—	—	—	—
1949–50	Boston Olympics	EAHL	36	14	17	5	—	—	1	4.03	5	1	2	2	300	14	0	2.80
1951–52	Boston Olympics	EAHL	2	1	1	0	120	9	0	4.50	—	—	—	—	—	—	—	—
1951–52	Atlantic City Seagulls	EAHL	2	0	2	0	120	9	0	4.50	1	1	0	0	60	1	0	1.00
1952–53	Springfield Indians	EAHL	2	0	2	0	120	10	0	5.00	—	—	—	—	—	—	—	—
1952–53	Troy Uncle Sam's Trojans	EAHL	1	1	0	0	60	4	0	4.00	—	—	—	—	—	—	—	—
1954–55	New Haven Blades	EAHL	45	22	21	2	2700	196	1	4.36	4	0	4	0	240	27	0	6.75
1961–62	Minneapolis Millers	IHL	1	1	0	0	60	0	1	0.00	—	—	—	—	—	—	—	—
1962–63	St. Paul Saints	IHL	1	0	1	0	60	12	0	12.00	—	—	—	—	—	—	—	—
NHL totals			1	0	0	1	60	3	0	3.00	—	—	—	—	—	—	—	—

=== International ===
Year	Team	Event	GP	W	L	T	MIN	GA	SO	GAA
1949	United States	WC	8	6	2	0	—	—	2	2.00
Senior totals			8	6	2	0	—	—	2	2.00

== See also ==
- List of players who played only one game in the NHL
