= 1949–50 Toronto Maple Leafs season =

NHL hockey team season

1949–50 Toronto Maple Leafs
- League: 3rd NHL
- 1949–50 record: 31–27–12
- Home record: 18–9–8
- Road record: 13–18–4
- Goals for: 176
- Goals against: 173

Team information
- General manager: Conn Smythe
- Coach: Hap Day
- Captain: Ted Kennedy
- Arena: Maple Leaf Gardens

Team leaders
- Goals: Max Bentley (23)
- Assists: Ted Kennedy (24)
- Points: Sid Smith (45)
- Penalty minutes: Bill Ezinicki (144)
- Wins: Turk Broda (30)
- Goals against average: Turk Broda (2.48)

The 1949–50 Toronto Maple Leafs season was Toronto's 33rd season in the National Hockey League (NHL). The team, which entered the season having won three consecutive Stanley Cups, made the playoffs but lost in the semifinals.

== Regular season ==
=== Final standings ===
National Hockey League
		GP	W	L	T	GF	GA	DIFF	Pts
1	Detroit Red Wings	70	37	19	14	229	164	+65	88
2	Montreal Canadiens	70	29	22	19	172	150	+22	77
3	Toronto Maple Leafs	70	31	27	12	176	173	+3	74
4	New York Rangers	70	28	31	11	170	189	−19	67
5	Boston Bruins	70	22	32	16	198	228	−30	60
6	Chicago Black Hawks	70	22	38	10	203	244	−41	54

=== Record vs. opponents ===
1949–50 NHL Records
Team	BOS	CHI	DET	MTL	NYR	TOR
Boston	—	5–7–2	3–8–3	4–5–5	5–5–4	5–7–2
Chicago	7–5–2	—	3–9–2	4–8–2	4–9–1	4–7–3
Detroit	8–3–3	9–3–2	—	5–3–6	7–5–2	8–5–1
Montreal	5–4–5	8–4–2	3–5–6	—	7–5–2	6–4–4
New York	5–5–4	9–4–1	5–7–2	5–7–2	—	4–8–2
Toronto	7–5–2	7–4–3	5–8–1	4–6–4	8–4–2	—

== Schedule and results ==
1949–50 regular season
October

Game	Result	Date	Score	Opponent	Record
1	T	October 15, 1949	4–4	Chicago Black Hawks (1949–50)	0–0–1
2	W	October 16, 1949	5–1	@ Detroit Red Wings (1949–50)	1–0–1
3	L	October 19, 1949	1–3	Montreal Canadiens (1949–50)	1–1–1
4	T	October 22, 1949	2–2	New York Rangers (1949–50)	1–1–2
5	W	October 27, 1949	2–0	@ Montreal Canadiens (1949–50)	2–1–2
6	W	October 29, 1949	8–1	Boston Bruins (1949–50)	3–1–2
7	W	October 30, 1949	4–2	@ New York Rangers (1949–50)	4–1–2

November

Game	Result	Date	Score	Opponent	Record
8	T	November 2, 1949	3–3	New York Rangers (1949–50)	4–1–3
9	L	November 5, 1949	3–4	Detroit Red Wings (1949–50)	4–2–3
10	W	November 6, 1949	4–2	@ Chicago Black Hawks (1949–50)	5–2–3
11	L	November 10, 1949	2–4	@ Montreal Canadiens (1949–50)	5–3–3
12	W	November 12, 1949	4–0	Chicago Black Hawks (1949–50)	6–3–3
13	L	November 13, 1949	2–4	@ Boston Bruins (1949–50)	6–4–3
14	W	November 16, 1949	1–0	Montreal Canadiens (1949–50)	7–4–3
15	L	November 19, 1949	2–5	Detroit Red Wings (1949–50)	7–5–3
16	L	November 20, 1949	2–5	@ Detroit Red Wings (1949–50)	7–6–3
17	L	November 23, 1949	1–3	@ Boston Bruins (1949–50)	7–7–3
18	L	November 24, 1949	3–5	@ Montreal Canadiens (1949–50)	7–8–3
19	T	November 26, 1949	3–3	Boston Bruins (1949–50)	7–8–4
20	L	November 27, 1949	3–6	@ Chicago Black Hawks (1949–50)	7–9–4

December

Game	Result	Date	Score	Opponent	Record
21	L	December 1, 1949	0–2	Detroit Red Wings (1949–50)	7–10–4
22	W	December 3, 1949	2–0	New York Rangers (1949–50)	8–10–4
23	W	December 4, 1949	2–1	@ Detroit Red Wings (1949–50)	9–10–4
24	W	December 8, 1949	4–1	@ Chicago Black Hawks (1949–50)	10–10–4
25	W	December 10, 1949	2–1	Boston Bruins (1949–50)	11–10–4
26	L	December 11, 1949	0–2	@ Boston Bruins (1949–50)	11–11–4
27	T	December 14, 1949	2–2	Montreal Canadiens (1949–50)	11–11–5
28	L	December 15, 1949	1–4	@ Montreal Canadiens (1949–50)	11–12–5
29	L	December 17, 1949	1–7	Chicago Black Hawks (1949–50)	11–13–5
30	W	December 18, 1949	2–0	@ New York Rangers (1949–50)	12–13–5
31	L	December 21, 1949	1–7	@ Detroit Red Wings (1949–50)	12–14–5
32	L	December 24, 1949	4–8	Boston Bruins (1949–50)	12–15–5
33	L	December 25, 1949	1–3	@ New York Rangers (1949–50)	12–16–5
34	T	December 28, 1949	1–1	Montreal Canadiens (1949–50)	12–16–6
35	L	December 31, 1949	1–5	Detroit Red Wings (1949–50)	12–17–6

January

Game	Result	Date	Score	Opponent	Record
36	L	January 1, 1950	0–5	@ Detroit Red Wings (1949–50)	12–18–6
37	T	January 4, 1950	4–4	Chicago Black Hawks (1949–50)	12–18–7
38	W	January 7, 1950	5–2	Chicago Black Hawks (1949–50)	13–18–7
39	W	January 11, 1950	2–1	@ New York Rangers (1949–50)	14–18–7
40	W	January 14, 1950	4–3	Boston Bruins (1949–50)	15–18–7
41	L	January 18, 1950	0–1	Montreal Canadiens (1949–50)	15–19–7
42	W	January 19, 1950	4–2	@ Montreal Canadiens (1949–50)	16–19–7
43	W	January 21, 1950	2–1	New York Rangers (1949–50)	17–19–7
44	W	January 22, 1950	1–0	@ Detroit Red Wings (1949–50)	18–19–7
45	W	January 25, 1950	5–1	New York Rangers (1949–50)	19–19–7
46	W	January 28, 1950	9–1	Chicago Black Hawks (1949–50)	20–19–7
47	W	January 29, 1950	4–0	@ Chicago Black Hawks (1949–50)	21–19–7

February

Game	Result	Date	Score	Opponent	Record
48	L	February 1, 1950	0–3	@ Chicago Black Hawks (1949–50)	21–20–7
49	T	February 4, 1950	3–3	Detroit Red Wings (1949–50)	21–20–8
50	W	February 5, 1950	2–1	@ Boston Bruins (1949–50)	22–20–8
51	W	February 8, 1950	3–1	@ Boston Bruins (1949–50)	23–20–8
52	W	February 11, 1950	2–0	Montreal Canadiens (1949–50)	24–20–8
53	T	February 12, 1950	1–1	@ Chicago Black Hawks (1949–50)	24–20–9
54	T	February 16, 1950	3–3	@ Montreal Canadiens (1949–50)	24–20–10
55	W	February 18, 1950	3–2	Detroit Red Wings (1949–50)	25–20–10
56	L	February 19, 1950	1–2	@ New York Rangers (1949–50)	25–21–10
57	W	February 22, 1950	3–1	Boston Bruins (1949–50)	26–21–10
58	W	February 25, 1950	4–2	New York Rangers (1949–50)	27–21–10

March

Game	Result	Date	Score	Opponent	Record
59	L	March 1, 1950	2–5	@ Boston Bruins (1949–50)	27–22–10
60	W	March 4, 1950	3–2	Detroit Red Wings (1949–50)	28–22–10
61	L	March 5, 1950	2–5	@ New York Rangers (1949–50)	28–23–10
62	T	March 9, 1950	1–1	@ Montreal Canadiens (1949–50)	28–23–11
63	W	March 11, 1950	4–0	New York Rangers (1949–50)	29–23–11
64	T	March 12, 1950	2–2	@ Boston Bruins (1949–50)	29–23–12
65	L	March 15, 1950	0–4	@ Chicago Black Hawks (1949–50)	29–24–12
66	W	March 18, 1950	2–1	Chicago Black Hawks (1949–50)	30–24–12
67	L	March 19, 1950	0–5	@ Detroit Red Wings (1949–50)	30–25–12
68	L	March 22, 1950	1–2	Montreal Canadiens (1949–50)	30–26–12
69	W	March 25, 1950	8–0	Boston Bruins (1949–50)	31–26–12
70	L	March 26, 1950	3–5	@ New York Rangers (1949–50)	31–27–12

Legend: Win (2 points) Loss (0 points) Tie (1 point)

== Player statistics ==
=== Regular season ===
Scoring

Player	GP	G	A	Pts	PIM
Sid Smith	68	22	23	45	6
Ted Kennedy	53	20	24	44	34
Max Bentley	69	23	18	41	14
Howie Meeker	70	18	22	40	35
Harry Watson	60	19	16	35	11
Joe Klukay	70	15	16	31	19
Cal Gardner	31	7	19	26	12
Ray Timgren	68	7	18	25	22
Bill Ezinicki	67	10	12	22	144
Vic Lynn	70	7	13	20	39
Fleming MacKell	36	7	13	20	24
Bill Barilko	59	7	10	17	85
Gus Mortson	68	3	14	17	125
Bill Juzda	62	1	14	15	68
Jimmy Thomson	70	0	13	13	76
John McCormack	34	6	5	11	0
Garth Boesch	58	2	6	8	63
Rudy Migay	18	1	5	6	8
Bob Dawes	11	1	2	3	2
Frank Mathers	6	0	1	1	2
George Armstrong	2	0	0	0	0
John Arundel	3	0	0	0	9
Hugh Bolton	2	0	0	0	2
Turk Broda	68	0	0	0	2
Al Buchanan	1	0	0	0	0
Bob Hassard	1	0	0	0	0
Tim Horton	1	0	0	0	2
Bill Johansen	1	0	0	0	0
Gilles Mayer	1	0	0	0	0
Al Rollins	2	0	0	0	0
Phil Samis	2	0	0	0	0
Frank Sullivan	1	0	0	0	0

Goaltending

Player	MIN	GP	W	L	T	GA	GAA	SA	SV	SV%	SO
Turk Broda	4040	68	30	25	12	167	2.48				9
Al Rollins	100	2	1	1	0	4	2.40				1
Gilles Mayer	60	1	0	1	0	2	2.00				0
Team:	4200	70	31	27	12	173	2.47				10

=== Playoffs ===
Scoring

Player	GP	G	A	Pts	PIM
Max Bentley	7	3	3	6	0
Ray Timgren	6	0	4	4	2
Joe Klukay	7	3	0	3	4
Ted Kennedy	7	1	2	3	8
Sid Smith	7	0	3	3	2
Bill Barilko	7	1	1	2	18
Fleming MacKell	7	1	1	2	11
Vic Lynn	7	0	2	2	2
Jimmy Thomson	7	0	2	2	7
Cal Gardner	7	1	0	1	4
John McCormack	6	1	0	1	0
Howie Meeker	7	0	1	1	4
Garth Boesch	6	0	0	0	4
Turk Broda	7	0	0	0	0
Les Costello	1	0	0	0	0
Bill Ezinicki	5	0	0	0	13
Tim Horton	1	0	0	0	2
Bill Juzda	7	0	0	0	16
Gus Mortson	7	0	0	0	18
Harry Watson	7	0	0	0	2

Goaltending

Player	MIN	GP	W	L	T	GA	GAA	SA	SV	SV%	SO
Turk Broda	450	7	3	4		10	1.33				3
Team:	450	7	3	4		10	1.33				3

== See also ==
- 1949–50 NHL season
