= Bert Hirschfeld =

Canadian ice hockey player (1929 - 1996)

- Hirschfeld in 1947 with the Montreal Royals
- Born: March 1, 1929; Halifax, Nova Scotia, Canada
- Died: July 3, 1996 (aged 67)
- Height: 5 ft 10 in (178 cm)
- Weight: 165 lb (75 kg; 11 st 11 lb)
- Position: Left Wing
- Shot: Left
- Played for: Montreal Canadiens
- Playing career: 1948–1962

John Albert Hirschfeld (March 1, 1929 — July 3, 1996) was a Canadian ice hockey forward. He played 33 games in the National Hockey League for the Montreal Canadiens during the 1949–50 and 1950–51 seasons. The rest of his career, which lasted from 1948 to 1963, was spent in the minor leagues.

== Career statistics ==
=== Regular season and playoffs ===
			Regular season					Playoffs
Season	Team	League	GP	G	A	Pts	PIM	GP	G	A	Pts	PIM
1946–47	Halifax St. Mary's	Exhib	7	13	15	28	0	—	—	—	—	—
1946–47	Halifax St. Mary's	M-Cup	—	—	—	—	—	7	8	12	20	2
1947–48	Halifax St. Mary's	Exhib	25	16	39	55	11	—	—	—	—	—
1947–48	Halifax Crescents	HCSHL	2	1	3	4	2	—	—	—	—	—
1947–48	Halifax St. Mary's	M-Cup	—	—	—	—	—	8	19	8	27	0
1948–49	Montreal Junior Royals	QJAHA	40	32	26	58	17	10	11	4	15	5
1948–49	Montreal Royals	QSHL	1	0	0	0	0	—	—	—	—	—
1948–49	Montreal Junior Royals	M-Cup	—	—	—	—	—	15	12	11	23	10
1949–50	Montreal Canadiens	NHL	13	1	2	3	2	5	1	0	1	0
1949–50	Cincinnati Mohawks	AHL	53	22	12	34	2	—	—	—	—	—
1949–50	Montreal Royals	QSHL	8	1	1	2	0	—	—	—	—	—
1950–51	Montreal Canadiens	NHL	20	0	2	2	0	—	—	—	—	—
1950–51	Cincinnati Mohawks	AHL	42	15	8	23	2	—	—	—	—	—
1951–52	Indianapolis Capitals	AHL	67	23	38	61	8	—	—	—	—	—
1952–53	St. Louis Flyers	AHL	58	12	27	39	4	—	—	—	—	—
1953–54	Providence Reds	AHL	60	10	26	36	10	—	—	—	—	—
1954–55	Moncton Hawks	ACSHL	66	29	27	56	10	13	7	8	15	0
1954–55	Moncton Hawks	Al-Cup	—	—	—	—	—	13	11	5	16	0
1955–56	Moncton Hawks	ACSHL	70	12	40	52	31	8	1	2	3	2
1955–56	New Haven Blades	EHL	1	0	2	2	0	—	—	—	—	—
1956–57	Campbelllton Tigers	NNBHL	27	9	15	24	6	12	10	4	14	4
1958–59	Halifax Wolves	NSSHL	28	3	9	12	0	—	—	—	—	—
1959–60	Halifax Wolves	NSSHL	11	6	9	15	—	—	—	—	—	—
1960–61	Halifax Wolves	NSSHL	28	25	17	42	2	5	3	2	5	2
1961–62	Halifax Wolves	NSSHL	25	11	20	31	2	5	6	6	12	2
1962–63	Halifax Wolves	NSSHL	—	—	—	—	—	—	—	—	—	—
AHL totals			280	82	111	193	26	5	1	0	1	0
NHL totals			33	1	4	5	2	5	1	0	1	0
