= 1949–50 NHL transactions =

The following is a list of all team-to-team transactions that have occurred in the National Hockey League (NHL) during the 1949–50 NHL season. It lists which team each player has been traded to and for which player(s) or other consideration(s), if applicable.

== Transactions ==
June, 1949 exact date unknown	To Detroit Red Wings cash	To New York Rangers Bill McDonagh
August 16, 1949	To Boston Bruins Pete Horeck; Bill Quackenbush	To Detroit Red Wings Pete Babando; Lloyd Durham; Clare Martin; Jimmy Peters Sr.
August 16, 1949	To Detroit Red Wings cash	To New York Rangers rights to Bud Poile
September 8, 1949	To Boston Bruins cash	To Chicago Black Hawks Frank Brimsek
October 7, 1949	To Boston Bruins Bill Moe rights to Lorne Ferguson future considerations	To New York Rangers Pat Egan
November 11, 1949	To Montreal Canadiens Calum MacKay cash	To Detroit Red Wings Joe Carveth
December 22, 1949	To Boston Bruins rights to Bud Poile	To New York Rangers cash
