= Bob Fryday =

Canadian ice hockey player

- Born: December 5, 1928; Toronto, Ontario, Canada
- Died: January 12, 2007 (aged 78)
- Height: 5 ft 10 in (178 cm)
- Weight: 155 lb (70 kg; 11 st 1 lb)
- Position: Right wing
- Shot: Right
- Played for: Montreal Canadiens
- Playing career: 1946–1953

Robert George Fryday (December 5, 1928 – January 12, 2007) was a Canadian professional ice hockey forward. He played five games in the National Hockey League for the Montreal Canadiens during the 1949–50 and 1951–52 seasons. The rest of his career, which lasted from 1946 to 1953, was spent in the minor leagues. He was born in Toronto, Ontario. He scored one goal during his NHL career.

== Career ==
Fryday played for the Montreal Junior Canadiens in 1947, scoring the game-winner in a preliminary round Memorial Cup play-off match against Halifax. He was named an all-star that year at the right wing position.

Fryday was called up on trial from the Montréal Royals for the Canadiens in 1950, tallying a goal in a 3-3 tie against Boston.

Fryday also played for the Montréal Royals and Cincinnati Mohawks in 1952. In 1953, he played for the Buffalo Bisons, sustaining an injury in a January game against Pittsburgh and then being assigned to Victoria. However, Fryday did not report to the Victoria team for the 1953-54 season.

== Career statistics ==
=== Regular season and playoffs ===
			Regular season					Playoffs
Season	Team	League	GP	G	A	Pts	PIM	GP	G	A	Pts	PIM
1944–45	Etobicoke Indians	OHA	—	—	—	—	—	—	—	—	—	—
1945–46	Toronto Marlboros	OHA	25	10	7	17	18	4	3	1	4	0
1945–46	Toronto Maher Jewelers	TIHL	20	11	13	24	8	10	9	4	13	0
1946–47	Montreal Royals	QSHL	27	26	26	52	11	8	8	7	15	6
1946–47	Montreal Junior Royals	M-Cup	—	—	—	—	—	7	9	10	19	5
1947–48	Montreal Royals	QSHL	44	22	8	30	21	3	0	1	1	0
1948–49	Montreal Royals	QSHL	64	24	20	44	32	8	3	3	6	11
1949–50	Montreal Canadiens	NHL	2	1	0	1	0	—	—	—	—	—
1949–50	Montreal Royals	QSHL	55	15	32	47	28	5	0	0	0	0
1950–51	Montreal Royals	QMHL	43	17	26	43	35	7	2	2	4	2
1951–52	Montreal Canadiens	NHL	3	0	0	0	0	—	—	—	—	—
1951–52	Montreal Royals	QMHL	51	15	15	30	32	6	1	0	1	2
1951–52	Cincinnati Mohawks	AHL	—	—	—	—	—	5	1	4	5	2
1952–53	Buffalo Bisons	AHL	57	18	13	31	6	—	—	—	—	—
QSHL totals			190	87	86	173	92	24	11	11	22	17
NHL totals			5	1	0	1	0	—	—	—	—	—
