= Silvio Bettio =

Canadian ice hockey player (1928–2006)

- Born: December 1, 1928 Copper Cliff, Ontario, Canada
- Died: June 14, 2006 (aged 77) Sudbury, Ontario, Canada
- Height: 5 ft 8 in (173 cm)
- Weight: 174 lb (79 kg; 12 st 6 lb)
- Position: Left wing
- Shot: Left
- Played for: Boston Bruins
- Playing career: 1947–1962

Silvio Angelo "Sam" Bettio (December 1, 1928 – June 14, 2006) was a Canadian professional ice hockey player who played in the National Hockey League (NHL). He spent one season in the NHL, playing 44 games for the Boston Bruins during the 1949–50 season. The rest of his career, which lasted from 1947 to 1962, was mainly spent in the minor American Hockey League.

== Career statistics ==
=== Regular season and playoffs ===
			Regular season					Playoffs
Season	Team	League	GP	G	A	Pts	PIM	GP	G	A	Pts	PIM
1945–46	Copper Cliff Jr. Redmen	NOJHA	8	2	3	5	0	3	7	2	9	0
1946–47	Copper Cliff Jr. Redmen	NOJHA	9	10	6	16	10	5	7	7	14	8
1946–47	Timmins Combines	M-Cup	—	—	—	—	—	3	1	0	1	4
1947–48	Hershey Bears	AHL	21	3	3	6	8	—	—	—	—	—
1947–48	Boston Olympics	QSHL	30	19	19	38	41	—	—	—	—	—
1948–49	Hershey Bears	AHL	58	15	25	40	18	11	3	4	7	4
1949–50	Boston Bruins	NHL	44	9	12	21	32	—	—	—	—	—
1949–50	Hershey Bears	AHL	23	7	10	17	8	—	—	—	—	—
1950–51	Hershey Bears	AHL	57	19	42	61	28	6	2	4	6	0
1951–52	Hershey Bears	AHL	64	18	37	55	27	5	2	0	2	13
1952–53	Hershey Bears	AHL	63	21	43	64	24	3	2	1	3	2
1953–54	Vancouver Canucks	WHL	68	24	39	63	49	5	1	1	2	2
1954–55	Buffalo Bisons	AHL	53	13	31	44	27	10	4	8	12	6
1955–56	Buffalo Bisons	AHL	61	14	17	31	37	2	1	1	2	0
1956–57	Buffalo Bisons	AHL	62	38	29	67	40	—	—	—	—	—
1957–58	Buffalo Bisons	AHL	70	19	34	53	39	—	—	—	—	—
1958–59	Sudbury Wolves	OHA Sr	19	13	15	28	0	5	4	0	4	4
1959–60	Sudbury Wolves	EPHL	67	45	56	101	39	14	7	7	14	23
1960–61	Sudbury Wolves	EPHL	65	37	50	87	99	—	—	—	—	—
1961–62	Sudbury Wolves	EPHL	35	12	22	34	41	6	1	7	8	2
AHL totals			532	167	271	438	256	37	14	18	32	25
NHL totals			44	9	12	21	32	—	—	—	—	—
