= 1949–50 Chicago Black Hawks season =

NHL ice hockey team season

1949–50 Chicago Black Hawks
- League: 6th NHL
- 1949–50 record: 22–38–10
- Home record: 13–18–4
- Road record: 9–20–6
- Goals for: 203
- Goals against: 244

Team information
- General manager: Bill Tobin
- Coach: Charlie Conacher
- Captain: Doug Bentley
- Arena: Chicago Stadium

Team leaders
- Goals: Metro Prystai (29)
- Assists: Bep Guidolin (34)
- Points: Roy Conacher (56)
- Penalty minutes: Bill Gadsby (138)
- Wins: Frank Brimsek (22)
- Goals against average: Frank Brimsek (3.49)

The 1949–50 Chicago Black Hawks season was the team's 24th season in the National Hockey League (NHL). The Black Hawks finished in sixth, out of the playoffs.

== Off-season ==
In goal, the Black Hawks acquired long-time Boston Bruins goaltender Frank Brimsek. Brimsek would play in all 70 games for the Hawks, winning 22 of them, earning five shutouts along the way, and posting a 3.49 GAA.

== Regular season ==
The Black Hawks had finished in fifth place in 1948–49, failing to qualify for the playoffs for the third year in a row. Prior to the season, the NHL announced that they would be adding ten games to the regular season schedule, raising it from 60 games to 70. Despite the extra games added, the Black Hawks would only win one more game than the previous season, and finish in last place in the NHL with 54 points, 13 behind the New York Rangers for the final playoff spot, missing the playoffs for the fourth straight season.

Offensively, the Hawks scoring was spread out, as 22-year-old Metro Prystai led the Hawks with 29 goals, Doug Bentley had a team high 33 assists, and Roy Conacher had a club-best 56 points. Bill Gadsby would be a force on the blueline, leading the way with 10 goals and 35 points, and having a team high 138 penalty minutes. The Hawks scored 203 goals, second highest total in the league, but would allow a league high 244 goals.

=== Season standings ===
National Hockey League
		GP	W	L	T	GF	GA	DIFF	Pts
1	Detroit Red Wings	70	37	19	14	229	164	+65	88
2	Montreal Canadiens	70	29	22	19	172	150	+22	77
3	Toronto Maple Leafs	70	31	27	12	176	173	+3	74
4	New York Rangers	70	28	31	11	170	189	−19	67
5	Boston Bruins	70	22	32	16	198	228	−30	60
6	Chicago Black Hawks	70	22	38	10	203	244	−41	54

=== Record vs. opponents ===
1949–50 NHL Records
Team	BOS	CHI	DET	MTL	NYR	TOR
Boston	—	5–7–2	3–8–3	4–5–5	5–5–4	5–7–2
Chicago	7–5–2	—	3–9–2	4–8–2	4–9–1	4–7–3
Detroit	8–3–3	9–3–2	—	5–3–6	7–5–2	8–5–1
Montreal	5–4–5	8–4–2	3–5–6	—	7–5–2	6–4–4
New York	5–5–4	9–4–1	5–7–2	5–7–2	—	4–8–2
Toronto	7–5–2	7–4–3	5–8–1	4–6–4	8–4–2	—

== Schedule and results ==
=== Regular season ===
1949–50 regular season
October

Game	Date	Visitor	Score	Home	Record	Points
1	October 13	Chicago Black Hawks	0–4	Montreal Canadiens	0–1–0	0
2	October 15	Chicago Black Hawks	4–4	Toronto Maple Leafs	0–1–1	1
3	October 19	Chicago Black Hawks	4–7	Boston Bruins	0–2–1	1
4	October 23	Chicago Black Hawks	3–3	Detroit Red Wings	0–2–2	2
5	October 25	New York Rangers	2–1	Chicago Black Hawks	0–3–2	2
6	October 27	Detroit Red Wings	3–1	Chicago Black Hawks	0–4–2	2
7	October 29	Chicago Black Hawks	2–0	New York Rangers	1–4–2	4
8	October 30	Boston Bruins	4–10	Chicago Black Hawks	2–4–2	6

November

Game	Date	Visitor	Score	Home	Record	Points
9	November 2	Montreal Canadiens	1–4	Chicago Black Hawks	3–4–2	8
10	November 6	Toronto Maple Leafs	4–2	Chicago Black Hawks	3–5–2	8
11	November 9	Chicago Black Hawks	3–1	Boston Bruins	4–5–2	10
12	November 12	Chicago Black Hawks	0–4	Toronto Maple Leafs	4–6–2	10
13	November 13	Montreal Canadiens	0–0	Chicago Black Hawks	4–6–3	11
14	November 16	Chicago Black Hawks	1–4	Detroit Red Wings	4–7–3	11
15	November 17	Boston Bruins	3–8	Chicago Black Hawks	5–7–3	13
16	November 20	New York Rangers	5–2	Chicago Black Hawks	5–8–3	13
17	November 24	Detroit Red Wings	3–3	Chicago Black Hawks	5–8–4	14
18	November 26	Chicago Black Hawks	7–2	Detroit Red Wings	6–8–4	16
19	November 27	Toronto Maple Leafs	3–6	Chicago Black Hawks	7–8–4	18

December

Game	Date	Visitor	Score	Home	Record	Points
20	December 1	Boston Bruins	4–5	Chicago Black Hawks	8–8–4	20
21	December 3	Chicago Black Hawks	3–5	Boston Bruins	8–9–4	20
22	December 4	Chicago Black Hawks	0–4	New York Rangers	8–10–4	20
23	December 7	Chicago Black Hawks	1–2	New York Rangers	8–11–4	20
24	December 8	Toronto Maple Leafs	4–1	Chicago Black Hawks	8–12–4	20
25	December 10	Chicago Black Hawks	1–1	Montreal Canadiens	8–12–5	21
26	December 11	Montreal Canadiens	3–0	Chicago Black Hawks	8–13–5	21
27	December 14	New York Rangers	3–5	Chicago Black Hawks	9–13–5	23
28	December 17	Chicago Black Hawks	7–1	Toronto Maple Leafs	10–13–5	25
29	December 18	Detroit Red Wings	5–3	Chicago Black Hawks	10–14–5	25
30	December 21	Boston Bruins	4–1	Chicago Black Hawks	10–15–5	25
31	December 25	Chicago Black Hawks	4–4	Boston Bruins	10–15–6	26
32	December 28	Chicago Black Hawks	2–5	New York Rangers	10–16–6	26
33	December 31	Chicago Black Hawks	2–3	Montreal Canadiens	10–17–6	26

January

Game	Date	Visitor	Score	Home	Record	Points
34	January 1	Montreal Canadiens	1–5	Chicago Black Hawks	11–17–6	28
35	January 4	Chicago Black Hawks	4–4	Toronto Maple Leafs	11–17–7	29
36	January 7	Chicago Black Hawks	2–5	Toronto Maple Leafs	11–18–7	29
37	January 8	Chicago Black Hawks	1–1	New York Rangers	11–18–8	30
38	January 10	Montreal Canadiens	7–3	Chicago Black Hawks	11–19–8	30
39	January 14	Chicago Black Hawks	0–3	Montreal Canadiens	11–20–8	30
40	January 15	Chicago Black Hawks	5–1	Boston Bruins	12–20–8	32
41	January 18	Detroit Red Wings	5–4	Chicago Black Hawks	12–21–8	32
42	January 21	Chicago Black Hawks	3–5	Detroit Red Wings	12–22–8	32
43	January 22	New York Rangers	3–4	Chicago Black Hawks	13–22–8	34
44	January 26	Boston Bruins	1–5	Chicago Black Hawks	14–22–8	36
45	January 28	Chicago Black Hawks	1–9	Toronto Maple Leafs	14–23–8	36
46	January 29	Toronto Maple Leafs	4–0	Chicago Black Hawks	14–24–8	36

February

Game	Date	Visitor	Score	Home	Record	Points
47	February 1	Toronto Maple Leafs	0–3	Chicago Black Hawks	15–24–8	38
48	February 4	Chicago Black Hawks	6–2	Montreal Canadiens	16–24–8	40
49	February 5	Montreal Canadiens	4–3	Chicago Black Hawks	16–25–8	40
50	February 8	Chicago Black Hawks	2–9	Detroit Red Wings	16–26–8	40
51	February 9	New York Rangers	5–3	Chicago Black Hawks	16–27–8	40
52	February 12	Toronto Maple Leafs	1–1	Chicago Black Hawks	16–27–9	41
53	February 15	Detroit Red Wings	0–3	Chicago Black Hawks	17–27–9	43
54	February 19	Boston Bruins	4–4	Chicago Black Hawks	17–27–10	44
55	February 22	Chicago Black Hawks	0–3	New York Rangers	17–28–10	44
56	February 23	New York Rangers	7–3	Chicago Black Hawks	17–29–10	44
57	February 26	Detroit Red Wings	4–1	Chicago Black Hawks	17–30–10	44

March

Game	Date	Visitor	Score	Home	Record	Points
58	March 2	Montreal Canadiens	2–5	Chicago Black Hawks	18–30–10	46
59	March 4	Chicago Black Hawks	1–3	Montreal Canadiens	18–31–10	46
60	March 5	Chicago Black Hawks	4–11	Boston Bruins	18–32–10	46
61	March 8	New York Rangers	4–2	Chicago Black Hawks	18–33–10	46
62	March 11	Chicago Black Hawks	1–5	Detroit Red Wings	18–34–10	46
63	March 12	Detroit Red Wings	4–2	Chicago Black Hawks	18–35–10	46
64	March 15	Toronto Maple Leafs	0–4	Chicago Black Hawks	19–35–10	48
65	March 18	Chicago Black Hawks	1–2	Toronto Maple Leafs	19–36–10	48
66	March 19	Boston Bruins	4–3	Chicago Black Hawks	19–37–10	48
67	March 21	Chicago Black Hawks	6–3	New York Rangers	20–37–10	50
68	March 22	Chicago Black Hawks	7–5	Boston Bruins	21–37–10	52
69	March 25	Chicago Black Hawks	0–4	Montreal Canadiens	21–38–10	52
70	March 26	Chicago Black Hawks	5–4	Detroit Red Wings	22–38–10	52

Legend: Win (2 points) Loss (0 points) Tie (1 point)

== Player statistics ==
=== Scoring leaders ===
Player	GP	G	A	Pts	PIM
Roy Conacher	70	25	31	56	16
Doug Bentley	64	20	33	53	28
Metro Prystai	65	29	22	51	31
Bep Guidolin	70	17	34	51	42
Bert Olmstead	70	20	29	49	40

=== Goaltending ===
Player	GP	TOI	W	L	T	GA	SO	GAA
Frank Brimsek	70	4200	22	38	10	244	5	3.49
