= Bill Johansen =

Canadian ice hockey player

- Born: July 27, 1928; Oslo, Norway
- Died: March 21, 2001 (aged 72); Thunder Bay, Ontario, Canada
- Height: 6 ft 0 in (183 cm)
- Weight: 163 lb (74 kg; 11 st 9 lb)
- Position: Centre
- Shot: Right
- Played for: Toronto Maple Leafs
- Playing career: 1949–1965

William Odd Johansen (July 27, 1928 – March 21, 2001) was a Canadian professional ice hockey centre. He played in one NHL game for the Toronto Maple Leafs during the 1949–50 season, on November 26, 1949 against the Boston Bruins. Born in Oslo, Norway, he grew up in Port Arthur, Ontario. He married Nan Courtney and had four children. After retiring from hockey, he worked as a pipe fitter. He died from cancer in 2001.

== Career statistics ==
=== Regular season and playoffs ===
			Regular season					Playoffs
Season	Team	League	GP	G	A	Pts	PIM	GP	G	A	Pts	PIM
1945–46	Fort William Rangers	TBJHL	8	1	5	6	4	—	—	—	—	—
1946–47	Fort William Rangers	TBJHL	6	7	7	14	2	3	1	2	3	2
1947–48	Fort William Rangers	TBJHL	9	14	5	19	0	2	1	0	1	2
1947–48	Port Arthur Bruins	M-Cup	—	—	—	—	—	13	3	4	7	4
1948–49	Toronto Marlboros	OHA Sr	36	13	12	25	8	10	2	6	8	2
1948–49	Toronto Marlboros	Al-Cup	—	—	—	—	—	13	4	8	12	4
1949–50	Toronto Maple Leafs	NHL	1	0	0	0	0	—	—	—	—	—
1949–50	Toronto Marlboros	OHA Sr	41	22	33	55	9	14	6	6	12	4
19549–50	Toronto Marlboros	Al-Cup	—	—	—	—	—	17	8	17	25	2
1950–51	Toronto Marlboros	OMHL	32	14	24	38	8	3	1	2	3	0
1951–52	Ottawa Senators	QSHL	54	19	30	49	6	7	1	2	3	0
1952–53	Ottawa Senators	QSHL	60	16	24	40	19	7	0	1	1	2
1953–54	Ottawa Senators	QSHL	67	16	35	51	23	22	6	9	15	8
1954–55	Ottawa Senators	QSHL	27	5	12	17	6	—	—	—	—	—
1954–55	Providence Reds	AHL	23	5	8	13	10	—	—	—	—	—
1955–56	Providence Reds	AHL	53	8	27	35	14	9	3	4	7	4
1956–57	Providence Reds	AHL	49	7	18	25	14	5	0	1	1	2
1957–58	Vancouver Canucks	WHL	61	17	25	42	10	6	2	3	5	2
1958–59	Winnipeg Warriors	WHL	62	20	29	49	12	7	2	2	4	2
1959–60	Winnipeg Warriors	WHL	58	14	22	36	4	—	—	—	—	—
1960–61	Vancouver Canucks	WHL	67	10	21	31	18	5	2	1	3	0
1961–62	Spokane Comets	WHL	67	14	23	37	8	8	2	1	3	0
1962–63	Spokane Comets	WHL	69	12	24	36	4	—	—	—	—	—
1963–64	Charlotte Checkers	EHL	27	16	10	26	6	—	—	—	—	—
1964–65	New York Rovers	EHL	62	20	33	53	4	—	—	—	—	—
1968–69	Fort William Beavers	TBSHL	13	7	12	19	6	—	—	—	—	—
1968–69	Port Arthur Bearcats	Al-Cup	—	—	—	—	—	—	7	9	16	0
1969–70	Thunder Bay Beavers	TBSHL	—	—	—	—	—	—	—	—	—	—
1969–70	Thunder Bay Beavers	Al-Cup	—	—	—	—	—	4	1	1	2	0
WHL totals			384	87	144	231	56	26	8	7	15	4
NHL totals			1	0	0	0	0	—	—	—	—	—

== See also ==
- List of players who played only one game in the NHL
