= 1949–50 Detroit Red Wings season =

Sports season

1949–50 Detroit Red Wings
- Stanley Cup champions
- Prince of Wales Trophy winners
- League: 1st NHL
- 1949–50 record: 37–19–14
- Home record: 19–9–7
- Road record: 18–10–7
- Goals for: 229
- Goals against: 164

Team information
- General manager: Jack Adams
- Coach: Tommy Ivan
- Captain: Sid Abel
- Alternate captains: Red Kelly; Ted Lindsay
- Arena: Detroit Olympia

Team leaders
- Goals: Gordie Howe (35)
- Assists: Ted Lindsay (55)
- Points: Ted Lindsay (78)
- Penalty minutes: Ted Lindsay (141)
- Wins: Harry Lumley (33)
- Goals against average: Terry Sawchuk (2.29)

The 1949–50 Detroit Red Wings season saw the team finish in first place in the National Hockey League (NHL) with a record of 37 wins, 19 losses, and 14 ties for 88 points. They defeated the Toronto Maple Leafs in seven games in the Semi-finals before downing the New York Rangers in the Stanley Cup Final, also in seven games. Both times the series was decided in overtime.

== Regular season ==
=== Final standings ===
National Hockey League
		GP	W	L	T	GF	GA	DIFF	Pts
1	Detroit Red Wings	70	37	19	14	229	164	+65	88
2	Montreal Canadiens	70	29	22	19	172	150	+22	77
3	Toronto Maple Leafs	70	31	27	12	176	173	+3	74
4	New York Rangers	70	28	31	11	170	189	−19	67
5	Boston Bruins	70	22	32	16	198	228	−30	60
6	Chicago Black Hawks	70	22	38	10	203	244	−41	54

=== Record vs. opponents ===
1949–50 NHL Records
Team	BOS	CHI	DET	MTL	NYR	TOR
Boston	—	5–7–2	3–8–3	4–5–5	5–5–4	5–7–2
Chicago	7–5–2	—	3–9–2	4–8–2	4–9–1	4–7–3
Detroit	8–3–3	9–3–2	—	5–3–6	7–5–2	8–5–1
Montreal	5–4–5	8–4–2	3–5–6	—	7–5–2	6–4–4
New York	5–5–4	9–4–1	5–7–2	5–7–2	—	4–8–2
Toronto	7–5–2	7–4–3	5–8–1	4–6–4	8–4–2	—

== Schedule and results ==
1949–50 regular season
October

Game	Result	Date	Score	Opponent	Record
1	W	October 12, 1949	2–1	Boston Bruins (1949–50)	1–0–0
2	L	October 16, 1949	1–5	Toronto Maple Leafs (1949–50)	1–1–0
3	W	October 19, 1949	6–1	New York Rangers (1949–50)	2–1–0
4	T	October 23, 1949	3–3	Chicago Black Hawks (1949–50)	2–1–1
5	W	October 27, 1949	3–1	@ Chicago Black Hawks (1949–50)	3–1–1
6	W	October 29, 1949	1–0	@ Montreal Canadiens (1949–50)	4–1–1
7	L	October 30, 1949	1–4	Montreal Canadiens (1949–50)	4–2–1

November

Game	Result	Date	Score	Opponent	Record
8	W	November 2, 1949	5–3	Boston Bruins (1949–50)	5–2–1
9	W	November 5, 1949	4–3	@ Toronto Maple Leafs (1949–50)	6–2–1
10	W	November 6, 1949	7–0	New York Rangers (1949–50)	7–2–1
11	W	November 12, 1949	7–5	@ Boston Bruins (1949–50)	8–2–1
12	T	November 13, 1949	1–1	@ New York Rangers (1949–50)	8–2–2
13	W	November 16, 1949	4–1	Chicago Black Hawks (1949–50)	9–2–2
14	W	November 19, 1949	5–2	@ Toronto Maple Leafs (1949–50)	10–2–2
15	W	November 20, 1949	5–2	Toronto Maple Leafs (1949–50)	11–2–2
16	W	November 23, 1949	4–3	New York Rangers (1949–50)	12–2–2
17	T	November 24, 1949	3–3	@ Chicago Black Hawks (1949–50)	12–2–3
18	L	November 26, 1949	2–7	Chicago Black Hawks (1949–50)	12–3–3
19	L	November 27, 1949	2–6	Montreal Canadiens (1949–50)	12–4–3
20	W	November 30, 1949	3–0	Boston Bruins (1949–50)	13–4–3

December

Game	Result	Date	Score	Opponent	Record
21	W	December 1, 1949	2–0	@ Toronto Maple Leafs (1949–50)	14–4–3
22	W	December 3, 1949	5–3	@ Montreal Canadiens (1949–50)	15–4–3
23	L	December 4, 1949	1–2	Toronto Maple Leafs (1949–50)	15–5–3
24	W	December 7, 1949	2–1	@ Boston Bruins (1949–50)	16–5–3
25	L	December 10, 1949	0–1	New York Rangers (1949–50)	16–6–3
26	L	December 11, 1949	1–2	@ New York Rangers (1949–50)	16–7–3
27	W	December 14, 1949	5–2	@ Boston Bruins (1949–50)	17–7–3
28	L	December 17, 1949	3–4	@ Montreal Canadiens (1949–50)	17–8–3
29	W	December 18, 1949	5–3	@ Chicago Black Hawks (1949–50)	18–8–3
30	W	December 21, 1949	7–1	Toronto Maple Leafs (1949–50)	19–8–3
31	W	December 25, 1949	4–2	Montreal Canadiens (1949–50)	20–8–3
32	T	December 28, 1949	2–2	Boston Bruins (1949–50)	20–8–4
33	W	December 31, 1949	5–1	@ Toronto Maple Leafs (1949–50)	21–8–4

January

Game	Result	Date	Score	Opponent	Record
34	W	January 1, 1950	5–0	Toronto Maple Leafs (1949–50)	22–8–4
35	L	January 4, 1950	1–2	@ New York Rangers (1949–50)	22–9–4
36	L	January 8, 1950	3–4	Boston Bruins (1949–50)	22–10–4
37	L	January 11, 1950	1–2	@ Boston Bruins (1949–50)	22–11–4
38	W	January 14, 1950	4–2	New York Rangers (1949–50)	23–11–4
39	W	January 15, 1950	1–0	@ New York Rangers (1949–50)	24–11–4
40	W	January 18, 1950	5–4	@ Chicago Black Hawks (1949–50)	25–11–4
41	W	January 21, 1950	5–3	Chicago Black Hawks (1949–50)	26–11–4
42	L	January 22, 1950	0–1	Toronto Maple Leafs (1949–50)	26–12–4
43	T	January 25, 1950	4–4	Boston Bruins (1949–50)	26–12–5
44	T	January 26, 1950	1–1	@ Montreal Canadiens (1949–50)	26–12–6
45	T	January 28, 1950	1–1	@ Montreal Canadiens (1949–50)	26–12–7
46	L	January 29, 1950	1–4	@ Boston Bruins (1949–50)	26–13–7

February

Game	Result	Date	Score	Opponent	Record
47	T	February 1, 1950	3–3	Montreal Canadiens (1949–50)	26–13–8
48	T	February 4, 1950	3–3	@ Toronto Maple Leafs (1949–50)	26–13–9
49	T	February 5, 1950	5–5	New York Rangers (1949–50)	26–13–10
50	W	February 8, 1950	9–2	Chicago Black Hawks (1949–50)	27–13–10
51	W	February 11, 1950	9–4	@ Boston Bruins (1949–50)	28–13–10
52	L	February 12, 1950	0–4	@ New York Rangers (1949–50)	28–14–10
53	L	February 15, 1950	0–3	@ Chicago Black Hawks (1949–50)	28–15–10
54	L	February 18, 1950	2–3	@ Toronto Maple Leafs (1949–50)	28–16–10
55	W	February 20, 1950	2–0	Montreal Canadiens (1949–50)	29–16–10
56	T	February 23, 1950	1–1	@ Montreal Canadiens (1949–50)	29–16–11
57	W	February 26, 1950	4–1	@ Chicago Black Hawks (1949–50)	30–16–11

March

Game	Result	Date	Score	Opponent	Record
58	W	March 1, 1950	5–2	@ New York Rangers (1949–50)	31–16–11
59	L	March 4, 1950	2–3	@ Toronto Maple Leafs (1949–50)	31–17–11
60	T	March 6, 1950	2–2	Montreal Canadiens (1949–50)	31–17–12
61	W	March 8, 1950	5–3	@ Boston Bruins (1949–50)	32–17–12
62	L	March 9, 1950	1–3	@ New York Rangers (1949–50)	32–18–12
63	W	March 11, 1950	5–1	Chicago Black Hawks (1949–50)	33–18–12
64	W	March 12, 1950	4–2	@ Chicago Black Hawks (1949–50)	34–18–12
65	W	March 15, 1950	4–1	Montreal Canadiens (1949–50)	35–18–12
66	T	March 16, 1950	2–2	@ Montreal Canadiens (1949–50)	35–18–13
67	T	March 18, 1950	1–1	Boston Bruins (1949–50)	35–18–14
68	W	March 19, 1950	5–0	Toronto Maple Leafs (1949–50)	36–18–14
69	W	March 22, 1950	8–7	New York Rangers (1949–50)	37–18–14
70	L	March 26, 1950	4–5	Chicago Black Hawks (1949–50)	37–19–14

Legend: Win (2 points) Loss (0 points) Tie (1 point)

== Player statistics ==
=== Regular season ===
Scoring

Player	Pos	GP	G	A	Pts	PIM
Ted Lindsay	LW	69	23	55	78	141
Sid Abel	C/LW	69	34	35	69	46
Gordie Howe	RW	70	35	33	68	69
Red Kelly	D/C	70	15	25	40	9
George Gee	C	69	17	21	38	42
Gerry Couture	RW	69	24	7	31	21
Jim McFadden	C	68	14	16	30	8
Jimmy Peters	RW	70	14	16	30	20
Joe Carveth	RW	60	13	17	30	13
Marty Pavelich	LW	65	8	15	23	58
Steve Black	LW	69	7	14	21	53
Leo Reise Jr.	D	70	4	17	21	46
Jack Stewart	D	65	3	11	14	86
Pete Babando	LW	56	6	6	12	25
Lee Fogolin Sr.	D	63	4	8	12	63
Max McNab	C	65	4	4	8	8
Clare Martin	D	64	2	5	7	14
Al Dewsbury	D	11	2	2	4	2
Fred Glover	C	7	0	0	0	0
Harry Lumley	G	63	0	0	0	10
Terry Sawchuk	G	7	0	0	0	0
Enio Sclisizzi	LW	4	0	0	0	2
Glen Skov	C/LW	2	0	0	0	0
Johnny Wilson	LW	1	0	0	0	0
Larry Wilson	C	1	0	0	0	2

Goaltending

Player	MIN	GP	W	L	T	GA	GAA	SO
Harry Lumley	3780	63	33	16	14	148	2.35	7
Terry Sawchuk	420	7	4	3	0	16	2.29	1
Team:	4200	70	37	19	14	164	2.34	8

=== Playoffs ===
Scoring

Player	Pos	GP	G	A	Pts	PIM
Gerry Couture	RW	14	5	4	9	2
George Gee	C	14	3	6	9	0
Sid Abel	C/LW	14	6	2	8	6
Ted Lindsay	LW	13	4	4	8	16
Marty Pavelich	LW	14	4	2	6	13
Joe Carveth	RW	14	2	4	6	6
Jim McFadden	C	14	2	3	5	8
Jack Stewart	D	14	1	4	5	20
Pete Babando	LW	8	2	2	4	2
Red Kelly	D/C	14	1	3	4	2
Al Dewsbury	D	4	0	3	3	8
Leo Reise Jr.	D	14	2	0	2	19
Jimmy Peters	RW	8	0	2	2	0
Clare Martin	D	10	0	1	1	0
Marcel Pronovost	D	9	0	1	1	10
Johnny Wilson	LW	8	0	1	1	0
Steve Black	LW	13	0	0	0	13
Lee Fogolin Sr.	D	10	0	0	0	16
Gord Haidy	RW	1	0	0	0	0
Gordie Howe	RW	1	0	0	0	7
Harry Lumley	G	14	0	0	0	0
Doug McKay	LW	1	0	0	0	0
Max McNab	C	10	0	0	0	0
Larry Wilson	C	4	0	0	0	0

Goaltending

Player	MIN	GP	W	L	GA	GAA	SO
Harry Lumley	910	14	8	6	28	1.85	3
Team:	910	14	8	6	28	1.85	3

Note: GP = Games played; G = Goals; A = Assists; Pts = Points; +/- = Plus-minus PIM = Penalty minutes; PPG = Power-play goals; SHG = Short-handed goals; GWG = Game-winning goals;
MIN = Minutes played; W = Wins; L = Losses; T = Ties; GA = Goals against; GAA = Goals-against average; SO = Shutouts;

== Playoffs ==
=== Stanley Cup Final ===
Detroit Red Wings vs. New York Rangers

Date	Away	Score	Home	Score	Notes
April 11	New York	1	Detroit	4	
April 13	Detroit	1	New York	3	†
April 15	Detroit	4	New York	0	†
April 18	New York	4	Detroit	3	OT
April 20	New York	2	Detroit	1	OT
April 22	New York	4	Detroit	5	
April 23	New York	3	Detroit	4	2OT

† Played in Toronto.

Detroit wins best-of-seven series four games to three

== Awards and records ==
- Prince of Wales Trophy
- Art Ross Trophy: || Ted Lindsay
- Sid Abel, Center, NHL First Team All-Star
- Gordie Howe, Right Wing, NHL Second Team All-Star
- Red Kelly, Defense, NHL Second Team All-Star
- Ted Lindsay, Left Wing, NHL First Team All-Star
- Leo Reise, Defense, NHL Second Team All-Star

== See also ==
- 1950 in Michigan
