= Louis Denis =

Canadian ice hockey player (1928–2022)

- Born: June 7, 1928 Vonda, Saskatchewan, Canada
- Died: October 11, 2022 (aged 94) Cornwall, Ontario, Canada
- Height: 5 ft 8 in (173 cm)
- Weight: 140 lb (64 kg; 10 st 0 lb)
- Position: Right wing
- Shot: Right
- Played for: Montreal Canadiens
- Playing career: 1948–1961

Louis Gilbert "Lulu" Denis (June 7, 1928 – October 11, 2022) was a Canadian professional ice hockey forward who played three games in the National Hockey League for the Montreal Canadiens during the 1949–50 and 1950–51 seasons. The rest of his career, which lasted from 1948 to 1961, was spent with the Montreal Royals in the Quebec Senior Hockey League. Denis died on October 11, 2022, at the age of 94.

== Career statistics ==
=== Regular season and playoffs ===
			Regular season					Playoffs
Season	Team	League	GP	G	A	Pts	PIM	GP	G	A	Pts	PIM
1945–46	Montreal Junior Canadiens	QJAHA	17	8	3	11	6	—	—	—	—	—
1946–47	Montreal Junior Canadiens	QJAHA	28	11	19	30	28	8	3	4	7	0
1947–48	Montreal Junior Canadiens	QJAHA	31	22	21	43	10	12	3	12	15	0
1948–49	Montreal Royals	QSHL	53	12	17	29	21	9	1	0	1	10
1949–50	Montreal Canadiens	NHL	2	0	1	1	0	—	—	—	—	—
1949–50	Montreal Royals	QSHL	57	24	23	47	51	6	1	1	2	2
1950–51	Montreal Canadiens	NHL	1	0	0	0	0	—	—	—	—	—
1950–51	Montreal Royals	QSHL	57	22	32	54	27	7	2	3	5	4
1951–52	Montreal Royals	QSHL	59	21	21	42	8	7	2	1	3	4
1952–53	Buffalo Bisons	AHL	2	1	0	1	0	—	—	—	—	—
1952–53	Montreal Royals	QSHL	51	23	16	39	14	14	3	4	7	4
1953–54	Montreal Royals	QSHL	68	16	36	52	14	11	0	6	6	4
1954–55	Montreal Royals	QSHL	62	20	47	67	8	4	0	0	0	2
1955–56	Montreal Royals	QSHL	61	14	25	39	17	13	8	10	18	0
1956–57	Montreal Royals	QSHL	68	22	26	48	34	4	0	1	1	0
1957–58	Montreal Royals	QSHL	61	21	31	52	11	7	4	4	8	4
1958–59	Montreal Royals	QSHL	61	15	31	46	39	8	3	3	6	4
1959–60	Montreal Royals	EPHL	67	22	31	53	33	14	2	3	5	4
1960–61	Montreal Royals	EPHL	34	8	9	17	6	—	—	—	—	—
QSHL totals			658	210	305	515	244	90	24	33	57	38
NHL totals			3	0	1	1	0	—	—	—	—	—
