= Don Smith (ice hockey, born 1929) =

Canadian ice hockey player

- Born: May 4, 1929; Regina, Saskatchewan, Canada
- Died: September 7, 2002 (aged 73); Nanaimo, British Columbia, Canada
- Height: 5 ft 10 in (178 cm)
- Weight: 165 lb (75 kg; 11 st 11 lb)
- Position: Center
- Shot: Left
- Played for: New York Rangers
- Playing career: 1945–1968

Donald Arthur Smith (May 4, 1929 – September 7, 2002) was a Canadian professional ice hockey player. He played 10 games in the National Hockey League with the New York Rangers during the 1949–50 season. The rest of his career, which lasted from 1949 to 1968, was spent in the minor leagues. His brother, Kenny Smith, was also a hockey player.

== Career statistics ==
=== Regular season and playoffs ===
			Regular season					Playoffs
Season	Team	League	GP	G	A	Pts	PIM	GP	G	A	Pts	PIM
1946–47	Humboldt Indians	SJHL	22	7	15	22	4	—	—	—	—	—
1947–48	Humboldt Indians	SJHL	17	0	1	1	2	—	—	—	—	—
1947–48	Medicine Hat Tigers	AJHL	12	4	3	7	2	—	—	—	—	—
1948–49	Medicine Hat Tigers	WCJHL	17	5	8	13	8	—	—	—	—	—
1949–50	New York Rangers	NHL	10	1	1	2	0	1	0	0	0	0
1949–50	New York Rovers	EAHL	32	15	9	24	2	—	—	—	—	—
1950–51	St. Paul Saints	USHL	59	18	19	37	34	4	1	1	2	2
1951–52	Cincinnati Mohawks	AHL	7	2	1	3	0	—	—	—	—	—
1951–52	Vancouver Canucks	PCHL	35	11	16	27	47	—	—	—	—	—
1952–53	Vancouver Canucks	WHL	66	13	15	28	29	9	2	2	4	18
1952–53	Fort Wayne Komets	IHL	7	1	0	1	2	—	—	—	—	—
1953–54	Vancouver Canucks	WHL	19	1	1	2	6	—	—	—	—	—
1953–54	Cincinnati Mohawks	IHL	53	27	31	58	110	11	3	1	4	20
1954–55	Cincinnati Mohawks	IHL	60	14	13	27	99	10	3	5	8	8
1955–56	Cincinnati Mohawks	IHL	59	37	44	81	45	8	7	3	10	2
1956–57	Cincinnati Mohawks	IHL	60	32	32	64	64	7	5	3	8	6
1957–58	Cincinnati Mohawks	IHL	59	28	49	77	76	4	1	1	2	2
1958–59	Indianapolis Chiefs	IHL	30	21	19	40	26	—	—	—	—	—
1959–60	Regina Capitals	SSHL	21	18	18	36	38	9	7	7	14	8
1960–61	Regina Capitals	SSHL	27	31	35	66	20	5	6	3	9	6
1960–61	Moose Jaw Pla-Mors	Al-Cup	—	—	—	—	—	3	1	3	4	0
1961–62	Saskatoon Quakers	SSHL	29	23	33	56	4	8	9	5	14	2
1961–62	Regina Capitals	Al-Cup	—	—	—	—	—	13	6	8	14	10
1962–63	Saskatoon Quakers	SSHL	25	19	30	49	8	11	7	10	17	4
1963–64	Saskatoon Quakers	SSHL	40	20	31	51	51	11	7	10	17	16
1963–64	Saskatoon Quakers	Al-Cup	—	—	—	—	—	9	6	6	12	6
1965–66	Yorkton Terriers	WCSHL	30	7	12	19	25	5	1	1	2	2
1966–67	Yorkton Terriers	WCSHL	13	3	1	4	0	—	—	—	—	—
1966–67	Saskatoon Quakers	SSHL	34	6	13	19	59	4	0	1	1	4
1967–68	Saskatoon Quakers	WCSHL	20	2	10	12	40	4	0	0	0	10
IHL totals			328	160	188	348	422	40	19	13	32	38
NHL totals			10	1	1	2	0	1	0	0	0	0
