= Roger Leger =

Canadian ice hockey player

- Leger with the Montreal Canadiens
- Born: March 26, 1919; L'Annonciation, Quebec, Canada
- Died: April 7, 1965 (aged 46); Riviere-Rouge, Quebec, Canada
- Height: 5 ft 11 in (180 cm)
- Weight: 200 lb (91 kg; 14 st 4 lb)
- Position: Defence
- Shot: Right
- Played for: Montreal Canadiens; New York Rangers
- Playing career: 1940–1956

Joseph Ernest Roger Léger (March 26, 1919 – April 7, 1965) was a Canadian professional ice hockey player. He played 187 games in the National Hockey League with the Montreal Canadiens and New York Rangers from 1943 to 1950. He was born in L'Annonciation, Quebec.

== Career statistics ==
=== Regular season and playoffs ===
			Regular season					Playoffs
Season	Team	League	GP	G	A	Pts	PIM	GP	G	A	Pts	PIM
1940–41	Joliette Cyclones	MCHL	26	19	28	47	22	4	4	3	7	6
1941–42	Joliette Cyclones	MCHL	30	29	24	53	62	—	—	—	—	—
1943–44	New York Rangers	NHL	7	1	2	3	2	—	—	—	—	—
1943–44	New York Rovers	EAHL	3	4	1	5	4	—	—	—	—	—
1943–44	Buffalo Bisons	AHL	29	7	17	24	10	9	6	7	13	4
1944–45	Buffalo Bisons	AHL	54	19	36	55	36	6	0	4	4	12
1945–46	Buffalo Bisons	AHL	57	22	35	57	41	12	1	8	9	4
1946–47	Montreal Canadiens	NHL	49	4	18	22	12	11	0	6	6	10
1946–47	Buffalo Bisons	AHL	10	2	3	5	8	—	—	—	—	—
1947–48	Montreal Canadiens	NHL	48	4	14	18	26	—	—	—	—	—
1948–49	Montreal Canadiens	NHL	28	6	7	13	10	5	0	1	1	2
1948–49	Buffalo Bisons	AHL	10	1	2	3	6	—	—	—	—	—
1948–49	Dallas Texans	USHL	12	3	5	8	12	—	—	—	—	—
1949–50	Montreal Canadiens	NHL	55	3	12	15	21	4	0	0	0	2
1949–50	Cincinnati Mohawks	AHL	11	4	4	8	2	—	—	—	—	—
1950–51	Vancouver Canucks	PCHL	68	17	43	60	84	12	1	4	5	8
1951–52	Vancouver Canucks	PCHL	70	16	47	63	68	13	2	9	11	14
1952–53	Montreal Royals	QSHL	60	5	30	35	22	16	2	7	9	15
1953–54	Montreal Royals	QSHL	61	8	29	37	50	11	1	5	6	2
1954–55	Shawinigan Falls Cataractes	QSHL	59	2	29	31	83	11	1	9	10	6
1955–56	Shawinigan Falls Cataractes	QSHL	45	4	17	21	29	10	0	0	0	0
NHL totals			187	18	53	71	71	20	0	7	7	14
