= Bob Frampton =

Canadian ice hockey player (1929-2001)

- Frampton, 1947 Montreal Royals
- Born: January 20, 1929; Toronto, Ontario, Canada
- Died: September 8, 2001 (aged 72); Montreal, Quebec, Canada
- Height: 5 ft 10 in (178 cm)
- Weight: 175 lb (79 kg; 12 st 7 lb)
- Position: Left wing
- Shot: Left
- Played for: Montreal Canadiens
- Playing career: 1948–1955

Robert James Percival Frampton (January 20, 1929 – September 8, 2001) was a Canadian professional ice hockey forward. He played in 2 regular-season games and 3 Stanley Cup playoff games in the National Hockey League for the Montreal Canadiens during the 1949–50 season. the rest of his career, which lasted from 1949 to 1955, was spent in the minor leagues. In his last year of junior ice hockey, Frampton won the 1949 Memorial Cup as a member of the Montreal Royals; this was the first ever Memorial Cup win by a team from Quebec.

== Career statistics ==
=== Regular season and playoffs ===
			Regular season					Playoffs
Season	Team	League	GP	G	A	Pts	PIM	GP	G	A	Pts	PIM
1946–47	Montreal Junior Royals	QJAHA	27	22	9	31	25	8	4	4	8	4
1947–48	Montreal Junior Royals	QJAHA	27	19	27	46	40	7	3	2	5	11
1948–49	Montreal Junior Royals	QJAHA	46	32	33	65	44	10	11	4	15	8
1948–49	Montreal Royals	QSHL	2	0	1	1	2	—	—	—	—	—
1948–49	Montreal Royals	M-Cup	—	—	—	—	—	15	13	4	17	12
1949–50	Montreal Canadiens	NHL	2	0	0	0	0	3	0	0	0	0
1949–50	Cincinnati Mohawks	AHL	60	9	19	28	29	—	—	—	—	—
1950–51	Vancouver Canucks	PCHL	52	20	21	41	40	12	2	5	7	2
1951–52	Vancouver Canucks	PCHL	69	34	26	60	50	13	8	3	11	4
1952–53	Montreal Royals	QMHL	59	19	18	37	32	16	4	8	12	10
1953–54	Montreal Royals	QSHL	55	12	18	30	18	8	0	1	1	16
1954–55	Montreal Royals	QSHL	6	1	1	2	0	—	—	—	—	—
PCHL totals			121	54	47	101	90	25	10	8	18	6
NHL totals			2	0	0	0	0	3	0	0	0	0
