= Edward Slowinski =

Canadian ice hockey player (1922–1999)

- Born: November 18, 1922 Winnipeg, Manitoba, Canada
- Died: August 21, 1999 (aged 76) Erie County, New York, USA
- Height: 6 ft 0 in (183 cm)
- Weight: 200 lb (91 kg; 14 st 4 lb)
- Position: Right wing
- Shot: Right
- Played for: New York Rangers
- Playing career: 1945–1958

Edward Stanley "Eddie" Slowinski (November 18, 1922 – August 21, 1999) was a Canadian professional ice hockey player who played 291 games in the National Hockey League (NHL) between 1947 and 1953. Born in Winnipeg, Manitoba, he spent most of his career with the New York Rangers.

== Career ==
Slowinski began his junior career with the Winnipeg Monarchs in the playoffs of the 1940-41 season, scoring two goals in three games. He stayed in Winnipeg for one more season before moving on to the Ottawa Army and then Ottawa Commandos. Over the next few years he went from team to team - the Red Deer Rangers, Calgary and Winnipeg Navy, and the Ottawa Senators - before making it to the NHL. The New York Rangers put Slowinski into their lineup for the 1947-48 season and, despite playing a handful of games for their AHL team, he was a New York Ranger for his whole career.

In the 1949-50 Stanley Cup playoffs, the Rangers were up three games to two over the Red Wings when the Wings came back and took the championship in overtime of the seventh game. Slowinski led all scorers in assists that playoff year but never held the Stanley Cup. He played five more seasons of pro hockey in the AHL before retiring after the 1957–58 season.

== Career statistics ==
=== Regular season and playoffs ===
			Regular season					Playoffs
Season	Team	League	GP	G	A	Pts	PIM	GP	G	A	Pts	PIM
1940–41	Winnipeg Monarchs	MJHL	—	—	—	—	—	3	2	0	2	2
1940–41	Winnipeg St. Paul's	MAHA	—	—	—	—	—	—	—	—	—	—
1941–42	Winnipeg Monarchs	MJHL	18	18	20	38	40	1	0	1	1	4
1942–43	Ottawa Army	OCHL	4	6	5	11	2	—	—	—	—	—
1942–43	Ottawa Commandos	OCHL	27	17	12	29	8	11	3	1	4	10
1942–43	Ottawa Commandos	Al-Cup	—	—	—	—	—	4	1	1	2	6
1943–44	Red Deer Wheelers	ASHL	16	6	9	15	0	5	3	0	3	9
1944–45	Calgary Navy	ASHL	16	16	11	27	10	—	—	—	—	—
1944–45	Winnipeg Navy	WSrHL	—	—	—	—	—	4	0	0	0	0
1945–46	Ottawa Senators	QSHL	30	26	29	55	10	9	3	6	9	4
1946–47	Ottawa Senators	QSHL	40	26	18	44	18	10	3	1	4	4
1947–48	New York Rangers	NHL	38	6	5	11	2	4	0	0	0	0
1947–48	New Haven Ramblers	AHL	18	9	9	18	2	—	—	—	—	—
1948–49	New York Rangers	NHL	20	1	1	2	2	—	—	—	—	—
1948–49	New Haven Ramblers	AHL	5	2	2	4	0	—	—	—	—	—
1948–49	St. Paul Saints	USHL	16	5	12	17	0	7	5	6	11	2
1949–50	New York Rangers	NHL	63	14	23	37	12	12	2	6	8	6
1950–51	New York Rangers	NHL	69	14	18	32	15	—	—	—	—	—
1951–52	New York Rangers	NHL	64	21	22	43	18	—	—	—	—	—
1952–53	New York Rangers	NHL	37	2	5	7	14	—	—	—	—	—
1953–54	Buffalo Bisons	AHL	67	38	41	79	16	3	1	0	1	2
1954–55	Buffalo Bisons	AHL	59	22	35	57	37	10	5	5	10	4
1955–56	Buffalo Bisons	AHL	63	23	26	49	24	5	1	0	1	2
1956–57	Springfield Indians	AHL	59	18	24	42	10	—	—	—	—	—
1957–58	Providence Reds	AHL	3	0	0	0	2	—	—	—	—	—
AHL totals			274	112	137	249	91	18	7	5	12	8
NHL totals			291	58	74	132	63	16	2	6	8	6

== Awards and achievements ==
- MJHL First All-Star Team (1942)
- USHL Championship (1949)
- AHL First All-Star Team (1954)
- Honoured Member of the Manitoba Hockey Hall of Fame
