= Bill McDonagh =

Canadian ice hockey player (1928–2019)

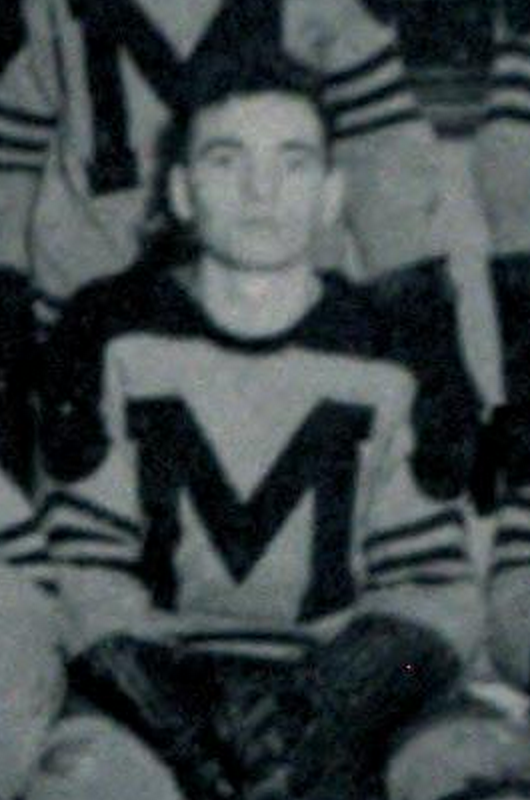
- McDonagh at St. Michaels College, 1948
- Born: April 30, 1928 Rouyn, Quebec, Canada
- Died: August 17, 2019 (aged 91) Toronto, Ontario, Canada
- Height: 5 ft 9 in (175 cm)
- Weight: 150 lb (68 kg; 10 st 10 lb)
- Position: Left wing
- Shot: Left
- Played for: New York Rangers
- Playing career: 1948–1958

Joseph William James McDonagh (April 30, 1928 – August 17, 2019) was a Canadian professional ice hockey left winger. He played four games in the National Hockey League with the New York Rangers during the 1949–50 season. The rest of his career, which lasted from 1948 to 1958, was spent in the minor leagues. McDonagh was born in Rouyn, Quebec, and grew up in Sudbury, Ontario.

== Career statistics ==
=== Regular season and playoffs ===
| | | | Regular season | | | | | Playoffs |
| Season | Team | League | GP | G | A | Pts | PIM | GP | G | A | Pts | PIM |
|---|---|---|---|---|---|---|---|---|---|---|---|---|
| 1947–48 | St. Michael's Majors | OHA | 3 | 0 | 0 | 0 | 0 | — | — | — | — | — |
| 1947–48 | St. Michael's Buzzers | OHA-B | — | — | — | — | — | — | — | — | — | — |
| 1948–49 | Detroit Bright's Goodyears | IHL | 29 | 19 | 20 | 39 | 25 | 2 | 1 | 0 | 1 | 0 |
| 1949–50 | New York Rangers | NHL | 4 | 0 | 0 | 0 | 2 | — | — | — | — | — |
| 1949–50 | New Haven Ramblers | AHL | 61 | 7 | 10 | 17 | 8 | — | — | — | — | — |
| 1950–51 | St. Paul Saints | USHL | 64 | 17 | 17 | 34 | 39 | 4 | 1 | 0 | 1 | 2 |
| 1951–52 | Shawinigan Falls Cataractes | QSHL | 46 | 3 | 9 | 12 | 8 | — | — | — | — | — |
| 1952–53 | Sydney Millionaires | MMHL | 82 | 28 | 35 | 63 | 50 | 6 | 2 | 1 | 3 | 12 |
| 1953–54 | Fredericton Capitals | MMHL | 49 | 19 | 26 | 45 | 61 | 15 | 7 | 7 | 14 | 21 |
| 1953–54 | Fredericton Capitals | Al-Cup | — | — | — | — | — | 8 | 3 | 7 | 10 | 6 |
| 1954–55 | Fredericton Capitals | MMHL | 51 | 16 | 38 | 54 | 70 | 6 | 1 | 5 | 6 | 2 |
| 1955–56 | Fredericton Capitals | MMHL | 60 | 21 | 49 | 70 | 46 | 9 | 2 | 5 | 7 | 2 |
| 1956–57 | University of New Brunswick | CIAU | 6 | 11 | 10 | 21 | 0 | 2 | 0 | 1 | 1 | 2 |
| 1956–57 | Fredericton Capitals | MMHL | — | — | — | — | — | — | — | — | — | — |
| 1956–57 | Fredericton Capitals | Al-Cup | — | — | — | — | — | 4 | 6 | 6 | 12 | 5 |
| 1957–58 | Sudbury Wolves | OHA Sr | 16 | 3 | 5 | 8 | 6 | — | — | — | — | — |
| NHL totals | | | 4 | 0 | 0 | 0 | 2 | — | — | — | — | — |
