= Dunc Fisher =

Canadian ice hockey player

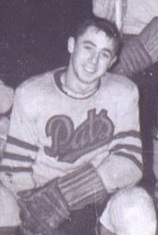
- Fisher with the 1946–47 Regina Pats
- Born: August 30, 1927 Regina, Saskatchewan, Canada
- Died: September 22, 2017 (aged 90) Regina, Saskatchewan, Canada
- Height: 5 ft 7 in (170 cm)
- Weight: 170 lb (77 kg; 12 st 2 lb)
- Position: Right wing
- Shot: Right
- Played for: New York Rangers; Boston Bruins; Detroit Red Wings
- Playing career: 1943–1960

Duncan Robert Fisher (August 30, 1927 – September 22, 2017) was a Canadian professional ice hockey player who played 275 games in the National Hockey League from 1947 to 1953 and again in 1958 to 1959. He played for the New York Rangers, Boston Bruins, and Detroit Red Wings.

From 1946 to 1947 he played with the Regina Pats and Regina Capitals, 1950 to 1951 with St. Paul Saints and from 1952-1953 as well as 1956-1960 with Hershey Bears and played on the Conference Championships and Calder Cup Finals. From 1962 to 1964 he was coach with the Regina St. Pats. After retiring from hockey, Fisher remained in Regina to work in sales with Staseson Decorating and International Paints and then worked at the City of Regina as manager of the Lawson Aquatic Centre and later managing the city's aquatics where he retired. Fisher died in the city in 2017.

== Career statistics ==
=== Regular season and playoffs ===
			Regular season					Playoffs
Season	Team	League	GP	G	A	Pts	PIM	GP	G	A	Pts	PIM
1944–45	Regina Abbotts	SJHL	15	5	6	11	30	—	—	—	—	—
1945–46	Regina Abbotts	SJHL	18	19	13	32	22	7	9	2	11	12
1946–47	Regina Pats	SJHL	26	28	16	44	12	6	5	7	12	8
1947–48	New Haven Ramblers	AHL	68	25	34	59	29	4	2	1	3	0
1947–48	New York Rangers	NHL	—	—	—	—	—	1	0	1	1	0
1948–49	New York Rangers	NHL	60	9	16	25	40	—	—	—	—	—
1949–50	New York Rangers	NHL	70	12	21	33	42	12	3	3	6	14
1950–51	New York Rangers	NHL	12	0	0	0	0	—	—	—	—	—
1950–51	St. Paul Saints	USHL	2	0	1	1	0	—	—	—	—	—
1950–51	Boston Bruins	NHL	53	9	20	29	20	6	1	0	1	0
1951–52	Boston Bruins	NHL	65	15	12	27	2	2	0	0	0	0
1952–53	Boston Bruins	NHL	7	0	1	1	0	—	—	—	—	—
1952–53	Hershey Bears	AHL	55	29	24	53	2	3	0	3	3	0
1953–54	Hershey Bears	AHL	69	41	39	80	24	11	4	1	5	2
1954–55	Hershey Bears	AHL	62	28	35	63	36	—	—	—	—	—
1955–56	Hershey Bears	AHL	60	40	43	83	73	—	—	—	—	—
1956–57	Hershey Bears	AHL	64	40	38	78	59	7	6	3	9	0
1957–58	Hershey Bears	AHL	70	41	47	88	56	11	6	7	13	0
1958–59	Detroit Red Wings	NHL	8	0	0	0	0	—	—	—	—	—
1958–59	Hershey Bears	AHL	62	19	32	51	28	13	4	9	13	12
1959–60	Hershey Bears	AHL	69	22	43	65	58	—	—	—	—	—
AHL totals			579	285	335	620	365	49	22	24	46	14
NHL totals			275	45	70	115	104	21	4	4	8	14

== Honours ==
- 2011 Saskatchewan Sports Hall of Fame
- 2014 Hershey Bears Hall of Fame in 2014
- 2025 AHL Hall of Fame
