= Norm Dussault =

American-born Canadian ice hockey player

- Born: September 26, 1925 Montreal, Sherbrooke
- Died: August 28, 2012 (aged 86) Sherbrooke, Quebec, Canada
- Height: 5 ft 8 in (173 cm)
- Weight: 165 lb (75 kg; 11 st 11 lb)
- Position: Centre
- Shot: Left
- Played for: Montreal Canadiens
- Playing career: 1945–1955; 1962

Joseph Normand Marcel "Ti-Nomme" Dussault (September 26, 1925 – August 28, 2012) was an American-born Canadian ice hockey player who played 206 games in the National Hockey League with the Montreal Canadiens from 1947 to 1951. The rest of his career lasted from 1945 to 1955 and was spent in the minor leagues.

== Biography ==
Dussault was born in Springfield, Massachusetts, where his father worked as an iceman. He moved to Sherbrooke, Quebec when he was two years old. Dussault played for the Montreal Canadiens.

Dussault also played professional baseball as an outfielder, first with the Sherbrooke Canadians in 1946, then with the Sherbrooke Athletics (1948–1950), and finally with the Sherbrooke Indians in 1955.

== Career statistics ==
=== Regular season and playoffs ===
			Regular season					Playoffs
Season	Team	League	GP	G	A	Pts	PIM	GP	G	A	Pts	PIM
1944–45	Montreal Junior Canadiens	QJAHA	2	0	3	3	2	—	—	—	—	—
1945–46	Baltimore Clippers	EAHL	43	12	16	28	13	7	0	0	0	0
1946–47	Victoriaville Tigres	QPHL	42	35	36	71	39	5	2	1	3	6
1947–48	Montreal Canadiens	NHL	28	5	10	15	4	—	—	—	—	—
1947–48	Victoriaville Tigres	QPHL	31	24	24	48	9	—	—	—	—	—
1948–49	Montreal Canadiens	NHL	47	9	8	17	6	2	0	0	0	0
1949–50	Montreal Canadiens	NHL	67	13	24	37	22	5	3	1	4	0
1950–51	Montreal Canadiens	NHL	64	4	20	24	15	—	—	—	—	—
1951–52	Chicoutimi Sagueneens	QSHL	48	16	23	39	21	18	3	11	14	4
1952–53	Chicoutimi Sagueneens	QSHL	60	23	20	43	10	20	4	2	6	6
1953–54	Chicoutimi Sagueneens	QSHL	68	25	34	59	14	5	0	2	2	0
1954–55	Chicoutimi Sagueneens	QSHL	60	10	32	42	14	5	0	1	1	2
1961–62	Sherbrooke Castors	ETSHL	—	—	—	—	—	7	1	3	4	6
NHL totals			206	31	62	93	47	7	3	1	4	0
