= 1949 Memorial Cup =

Canadian junior ice hockey championship

The Memorial Cup trophy

The 1949 Memorial Cup final was the 31st junior ice hockey championship of the Canadian Amateur Hockey Association. The George Richardson Memorial Trophy champions Montreal Royals of the Quebec Junior Hockey League in Eastern Canada competed against the Abbott Cup champions Brandon Wheat Kings of the Manitoba Junior Hockey League in Western Canada. In a best-of-seven series, held at Shea's Amphitheatre in Winnipeg, Manitoba and the Wheat City Arena in Brandon, Manitoba, Montreal won their 1st Memorial Cup, defeating Brandon 4 games to 3, with 1 tied game.

News reports claimed that bookies suffered throughout this series because the Royals and Wheat Kings, were such evenly matched forces. In Game 8, the Royals scored four goals in the third period to win 6–4 and secure the team's – and Quebec's – first Memorial Cup.

== Scores ==
- Game 1: Montreal 3-2 Brandon (in Winnipeg)
- Game 2: Brandon 3-2 Montreal (in Brandon)
- Game 3: Brandon 3-3 Montreal (in Brandon) (tie)
- Game 4: Montreal 1-0 Brandon (in Winnipeg)
- Game 5: Montreal 7-4 Brandon (in Brandon)
- Game 6: Brandon 2-1 Montreal (in Brandon)
- Game 7: Brandon 5-1 Montreal (in Brandon)
- Game 8: Montreal 6-4 Brandon (in Winnipeg)

== Winning roster ==
Eric Appleby, Gordon Armstrong, Matthew Benoit, Robert Bleau, Fredrick Burchell, Mike Darling, Victor Fildes, Bob Frampton, John Hirschfeld, Gordon Knutson, Neale Langill, Peter Larocque, Tommy Manastersky, Dickie Moore, William Rattay, Donald Rose, Roland Rousseau. Coach: J. T. Millar.
