= Jack Gelineau =

Canadian ice hockey player (1924–1998)

- Born: November 11, 1924 Toronto, Ontario, Canada
- Died: November 12, 1998 (aged 74) Montreal, Quebec, Canada
- Height: 6 ft 0 in (183 cm)
- Weight: 180 lb (82 kg; 12 st 12 lb)
- Position: Goaltender
- Caught: Left
- Played for: Boston Bruins; Chicago Black Hawks
- Playing career: 1949–1954

John Edward "Jack" Gélineau BEM (November 11, 1924 – November 12, 1998) was a Canadian ice hockey goaltender. He played in the National Hockey League with the Boston Bruins and Chicago Black Hawks between 1948 and 1954. He won the Calder Memorial Trophy in 1950 as the best rookie player in the NHL. Before playing in the NHL, Gélineau served in the Second World War and was awarded the British Empire Medal for actions in 1944.

== Playing career ==
During the Second World War, Gélineau played for the Montreal and Toronto Royal Canadian Air Force hockey teams. He was awarded the British Empire Medal (BEM) for gallantry after surviving a 1944 plane crash and rescuing an injured crewman from the burning plane that was loaded with ammunition.

After the war, Gélineau played in net with the Montreal Jr. Royals in 1944–45.

In 1945–46, Gélineau entered McGill University and graduated with a Bachelor of Commerce in 1949.

He starred in goal at McGill for four seasons, racking up a 40–16–1 overall record with a 3.14 goals against average. He also played intermediate basketball, football and varsity baseball which resulted in a tryout with the Boston Red Sox. The last McGill goalie named team captain, Gélineau backstopped the Redmen to the 1946 Queen's Cup championship. He was the first recipient of the Forbes Trophy as McGill's male athlete of the year in 1948.

That spring, he was called up to the Boston Bruins in the National Hockey League, becoming the first goalie in 30 years to play in the NHL while still attending university (two decades later, Ken Dryden duplicated this feat while studying law at McGill and playing for the Montreal Canadiens). He won the Calder Memorial Trophy as the NHL's top rookie in 1949–50 but was unable to capitalize on his early potential. Despite his successful debut, he could not get a raise out of the Bruins manager Art Ross. He took up a position with Sun Life Insurance in Montreal, though continued to play senior hockey over the next three seasons with the Quebec Aces in the Quebec Senior Hockey League, including two appearances with the Chicago Black Hawks in 1953–54. Gélineau retired in 1955.

Gélineau died on November 12, 1998, one day after his 74th birthday. He is buried at the National Field of Honour in Pointe-Claire, Quebec.

== Career statistics ==
=== Regular season and playoffs ===
			Regular season								Playoffs
Season	Team	League	GP	W	L	T	Min	GA	SO	GAA	GP	W	L	Min	GA	SO	GAA
1943–44	Toronto Young Rangers	OHA	11	1	9	1	680	58	1	5.12	—	—	—	—	—	—	—
1943–44	Toronto Cil	TMHL	4	0	4	0	240	22	0	5.50	—	—	—	—	—	—	—
1943–44	Toronto RCAF	TNDHL	7	5	2	0	420	21	1	3.00	1	0	1	60	3	0	3.00
1944–45	Montreal RCAF	MCHL	8	—	—	—	480	24	0	3.00	5	—	—	300	28	0	5.60
1944–45	Montreal Jr. Royals	QJHL	5	2	3	0	300	19	3	3.80	9	2	7	528	43	0	4.96
1945–46	McGill University	MCHL	15	13	2	0	900	52	1	3.47	—	—	—	—	—	—	—
1946–47	McGill University	MCHL	16	10	5	1	960	45	1	2.81	—	—	—	—	—	—	—
1947–48	McGill University	MCHL	20	14	6	0	1200	62	1	3.10	—	—	—	—	—	—	—
1948–49	McGill University	MCHL	6	3	3	0	360	20	0	3.33	—	—	—	—	—	—	—
1948–49	Boston Bruins	NHL	4	2	2	0	240	12	0	3.00	—	—	—	—	—	—	—
1949–50	Boston Bruins	NHL	67	22	30	15	4020	220	3	3.28	—	—	—	—	—	—	—
1950–51	Boston Bruins	NHL	70	22	30	18	4200	197	4	2.81	4	1	2	260	7	1	1.62
1951–52	Quebec Aces	QSHL	12	6	4	2	740	42	0	3.41	12	8	4	739	28	1	2.27
1952–53	Quebec Aces	QSHL	21	8	9	4	1300	59	1	2.72	21	13	8	1303	51	1	2.35
1953–54	Quebec Aces	QHL	57	24	27	6	3466	158	5	2.74	14	—	—	840	26	4	1.86
1953–54	Chicago Black Hawks	NHL	2	0	2	0	120	18	0	9.00	—	—	—	—	—	—	—
1954–55	Quebec Aces	QHL	11	4	7	0	640	38	1	3.56	4	1	3	240	14	0	3.50
NHL totals			143	46	64	33	8580	447	7	3.13	4	1	2	260	7	1	1.62

== Awards and achievements ==
- Queen's Cup champion in 1946.
- McGill's Male Athlete of the Year in 1948.
- Calder Memorial Trophy winner in 1950.

Preceded by Pentti Lund	Winner of the Calder Memorial Trophy; 1950	Succeeded by Terry Sawchuk
