= 1947 Memorial Cup =

Canadian junior ice hockey championship

The Memorial Cup trophy

The 1947 Memorial Cup final was the 29th junior ice hockey championship of the Canadian Amateur Hockey Association (CAHA). The George Richardson Memorial Trophy champions Toronto St. Michael's Majors of the Ontario Hockey Association in Eastern Canada competed against the Abbott Cup champions Moose Jaw Canucks of the Saskatchewan Junior Hockey League in Western Canada. The series was a rematch of the 1945 Memorial Cup, and featured the first Memorial Cup games played in the province of Saskatchewan. In a best-of-seven series, held at Shea's Amphitheatre in Winnipeg, Manitoba, Queen City Gardens in Regina, Saskatchewan, and at the Moose Jaw Arena in Moose Jaw, Saskatchewan, St. Michael's won their 3rd Memorial Cup, defeating Moose Jaw 4 games to 0.

During game three, Moose Jaw Canucks defender Jim Bedard was assessed a penalty which spectators protested by throwing bottles onto the ice surface. CAHA vice-president Al Pickard used the public address system to ask for calm, but spectators continued to litter the ice, and he subsequently forfeited the game in favour of the Majors. He warned that any repeat of the incident would result in the series being awarded to the Majors. He was later criticized by the Ontario Hockey Association for playing the series in Western Canada, but he felt that supporters of junior hockey in Western Canada deserved a chance to see the games despite the recent practice of playing all Memorial Cup finals at Maple Leaf Gardens to bring the greatest profits, which were reinvested into minor ice hockey in Canada.

== Scores ==
- Game 1: St. Michael's 12-3 Moose Jaw (in Winnipeg)
- Game 2: St. Michael's 6-1 Moose Jaw (in Moose Jaw)
- Game 3: St. Michael's 8-1 Moose Jaw (in Regina)
- Game 4: St. Michael's 3-2 Moose Jaw (in Regina)

== Winning roster ==
Les Costello, Ray Hannigan, Ed Harrison, Howard Harvey, Red Kelly, Fleming Mackell, John McLellan, Clare Malone, Rudy Migay, Bobby Paul, Harry Psutka, Ed Sanford, John Williams, Warren Winslow, Benny Woit. Coach: Joe Primeau
