= 1949–50 NHL season =

National Hockey League season

- League: National Hockey League
- Sport: Ice hockey
- Duration: October 12, 1949 – April 23, 1950
- Games: 70
- Teams: 6

Regular season
- Season champion: Detroit Red Wings
- Season MVP: Charlie Rayner (Rangers)
- Top scorer: Ted Lindsay (Red Wings)

Stanley Cup
- Champions: Detroit Red Wings
- Runners-up: New York Rangers

NHL seasons
- ← 1948–49 1950–51 →

The 1949–50 NHL season was the 33rd season of the National Hockey League. Six teams played 70 games each. The Detroit Red Wings defeated the New York Rangers in seven games for the Stanley Cup. It was the Red Wings' fourth championship.

== League business ==
The NHL decided to increase the number of games played from 60 to 70 games for each team. Each team played every other team 14 times. Goaltenders would no longer have to face a penalty shot if they took a major penalty. A team-mate could serve the penalty in the penalty box.

In June 1949, the NHL decided to henceforth paint the ice surface white. This was done by adding white paint to the water before freezing. Previously, the ice surface was just frozen water on concrete, which made a dull grey colour. By "whitening" the ice surface, it made seeing and following the puck much easier, especially on the relatively new medium of television.

== Regular season ==
Detroit, led by the new Production Line of Lindsay, Abel and Howe won the regular season. The Production line led the league in scoring 1–2–3.

=== Highlights ===
On November 2, 1949, at Chicago Stadium, a rather serious brawl broke out in a game Chicago defeated Montreal 4–1. During the second period, some rinkside fans began to get on Montreal defenceman Ken Reardon, and when one fan grabbed his sweater, Reardon swung his stick and hit one of the rowdies. Leo Gravelle and Billy Reay joined in, and yet another fan climbed over the boards and challenged Reardon, but was forced back to his seat. When the game ended, police arrested Reardon, Reay and Gravelle. Later, the players were cleared when a judge ruled that the fans were the aggressors and overstepped the prerogatives as fans.

After Chicago defeated Toronto 6–3 on November 27, Conn Smythe told goaltender Turk Broda, "I'm not running a fat man's team!" and said that Broda would not play until he reduced his weight to 190 lb. At the time, Broda weighed almost 200. Al Rollins was purchased from Cleveland of the AHL and Gil Mayer was brought up for good measure. When he reached 189 pounds, Broda went back into the Toronto net and he gained his fourth shutout of the season December 3 and Maple Leaf fans cheered all of his 22 saves.

After the Red Wings clobbered Chicago 9–2 on February 8, writer Lew Walter tried to interview Chicago coach Charlie Conacher. Conacher exploded in anger, criticized Walter's past stories and punched Walter, knocking him down to the floor. Walter announced that he would seek a warrant for Conacher's arrest. NHL president Clarence Campbell took a dim view of Conacher's actions and fined him $200. Conacher then phoned Walter and apologized, saying he regretted what had taken place.

Montreal fans began to boo Bill Durnan, as they had in 1947–48, despite the fact he was the league's best goalkeeper, and in an interview, he stated he was going to retire at the end of the season. In reality, Durnan had been cut a number of times during the season, and at one point, had to take penicillin. It caused a high fever and he missed some action. Despite this, he recorded eight shutouts and won the Vezina Trophy for the sixth time in his seven-year career.

Ken Reardon got himself into trouble when he made a statement to a magazine suggesting retribution to Cal Gardner, stating: "I'm going to make sure that Gardner gets 14 stitches in his mouth. I may have to wait a long time, but I'll get even." On March 1, 1950, Clarence Campbell made Reardon post a $1,000 bond to make sure he did not carry out his threat. When the season ended, Reardon was refunded the $1,000, since he did not hurt Gardner as he said he would.

=== Final standings ===
National Hockey League
		GP	W	L	T	GF	GA	DIFF	Pts
1	Detroit Red Wings	70	37	19	14	229	164	+65	88
2	Montreal Canadiens	70	29	22	19	172	150	+22	77
3	Toronto Maple Leafs	70	31	27	12	176	173	+3	74
4	New York Rangers	70	28	31	11	170	189	−19	67
5	Boston Bruins	70	22	32	16	198	228	−30	60
6	Chicago Black Hawks	70	22	38	10	203	244	−41	54

== Playoffs ==
=== Playoff bracket ===
The top four teams in the league qualified for the playoffs. In the semifinals, the first-place team played the third-place team, while the second-place team faced the fourth-place team, with the winners advancing to the Stanley Cup Finals. In both rounds, teams competed in a best-of-seven series (scores in the bracket indicate the number of games won in each best-of-seven series).

Semifinals
1	Detroit	4
3	Toronto	3
2	Montreal	1
4	New York	4

Stanley Cup Finals
1	Detroit	4
4	New York	3

=== Semifinals ===
Detroit defeated Toronto in seven games to advance to the Finals; while New York defeated Montreal in five games to also advance to the Finals.

==== (1) Detroit Red Wings vs. (3) Toronto Maple Leafs ====
March 28	Toronto Maple Leafs	5–0	Detroit Red Wings	Olympia Stadium	Recap
No scoring		First period	No scoring
Joe Klukay (1) – 00:10; Bill Barilko (1) – pp – 08:49; John McCormack (1) – sh – 11:29		Second period	No scoring
Cal Gardner (1) – 03:29; Joe Klukay (2) – 11:17		Third period	No scoring
Turk Broda		Goalie stats	Harry Lumley

March 30	Toronto Maple Leafs	1–3	Detroit Red Wings	Olympia Stadium	Recap
No scoring		First period	09:13 – pp – Red Kelly (1); 15:47 – Sid Abel (1)
No scoring		Second period	10:32 – Joe Carveth (1)
Fleming MacKell (1) – 05:44		Third period	No scoring
Turk Broda		Goalie stats	Harry Lumley

April 1	Detroit Red Wings	0–2	Toronto Maple Leafs	Maple Leaf Gardens	Recap
No scoring		First period	No scoring
No scoring		Second period	06:44 – Joe Klukay (3); 19:40 – Max Bentley (1)
No scoring		Third period	No scoring
Harry Lumley		Goalie stats	Turk Broda

April 4	Detroit Red Wings	2–1	2OT	Toronto Maple Leafs	Maple Leaf Gardens	Recap
Marty Pavelich (1) – 10:50		First period		03:34 – Max Bentley (2)
No scoring		Second period		No scoring
No scoring		Third period		No scoring
Leo Reise Jr. (1) – pp – 00:38		Second overtime period		No scoring
Harry Lumley		Goalie stats		Turk Broda

April 6	Toronto Maple Leafs	2–0	Detroit Red Wings	Olympia Stadium	Recap
Ted Kennedy (1) – pp – 10:35		First period	No scoring
No scoring		Second period	No scoring
Max Bentley (3) – 08:37		Third period	No scoring
Turk Broda		Goalie stats	Harry Lumley

April 8	Detroit Red Wings	4–0	Toronto Maple Leafs	Maple Leaf Gardens	Recap
Marty Pavelich (2) – pp – 06:55; George Gee (1) – 19:40		First period	No scoring
Gerry Couture (1) – pp – 10:31		Second period	No scoring
Jack Stewart (1) – 05:03		Third period	No scoring
Harry Lumley		Goalie stats	Turk Broda

April 9	Toronto Maple Leafs	0–1	OT	Detroit Red Wings	Olympia Stadium	Recap
No scoring		First period		No scoring
No scoring		Second period		No scoring
No scoring		Third period		No scoring
No scoring		First overtime period		08:39 – Leo Reise Jr. (2)
Turk Broda		Goalie stats		Harry Lumley

Detroit won series 4–3

==== (2) Montreal Canadiens vs. (4) New York Rangers ====
March 29	Montreal Canadiens	1–3	New York Rangers	Madison Square Garden III	Recap
Norm Dussault (1) – pp – 08:27		First period	14:40 – pp – Don Raleigh (1)
No scoring		Second period	11:18 – pp – Nick Mickoski (1)
No scoring		Third period	19:38 – Pat Egan (1)
Bill Durnan		Goalie stats	Chuck Rayner

April 1	New York Rangers	3–2	Montreal Canadiens	Montreal Forum	Recap
Pentti Lund (1) – 10:10		First period	06:57 – Floyd Curry (1); 09:48 – Norm Dussault (2)
No scoring		Second period	No scoring
Buddy O'Connor (1) – pp – 11:58; Ed Slowinski (1) – 13:34		Third period	No scoring
Chuck Rayner		Goalie stats	Bill Durnan

April 2	Montreal Canadiens	1–4	New York Rangers	Madison Square Garden III	Recap
Bert Hirschfeld (1) – 08:30		First period	07:12 – Pentti Lund (2); 15:58 – pp – Ed Slowinski (2)
No scoring		Second period	14:20 – Pentti Lund (3)
No scoring		Third period	02:16 – pp – Pentti Lund
Bill Durnan		Goalie stats	Chuck Rayner

April 4	New York Rangers	2–3	OT	Montreal Canadiens	Montreal Forum	Recap
Pentti Lund (5) – 09:14		First period		17:15 – pp – Norm Dussault (3)
Don Raleigh (2) – 09:07		Second period		No scoring
No scoring		Third period		09:34 – pp – Maurice Richard (1)
No scoring		First overtime period		15:19 – Elmer Lach (1)
Chuck Rayner		Goalie stats		Gerry McNeil

April 6	New York Rangers	3–0	Montreal Canadiens	Montreal Forum	Recap
No scoring		First period	No scoring
No scoring		Second period	No scoring
Jack Gordon (1) – 04:22; Pat Egan (2) – 05:18; Dunc Fisher (1) – 16:47		Third period	No scoring
Chuck Rayner		Goalie stats	Gerry McNeil

New York won series 4–1

=== Stanley Cup Finals ===
Two games were played in Toronto, with the rest in Detroit, as the circus had taken over Madison Square Garden in New York.

April 11	New York Rangers	1–4	Detroit Red Wings	Olympia Stadium	Recap
Buddy O'Connor (2) – 05:58		First period	No scoring
No scoring		Second period	04:43 – pp – Joe Carveth (2); 09:32 – George Gee (2); 10:06 – Jim McFadden (1); 13:56 – pp – Gerry Couture (2)
No scoring		Third period	No scoring
Chuck Rayner		Goalie stats	Harry Lumley

April 13	Detroit Red Wings	1–3	New York Rangers	Maple Leaf Gardens	Recap
No scoring		First period	No scoring
Gerry Couture (3) – 03:05		Second period	10:39 – Pat Egan (3)
No scoring		Third period	03:04 – Edgar Laprade (1); 11:20 – Edgar Laprade (2)
Harry Lumley		Goalie stats	Chuck Rayner

April 15	Detroit Red Wings	4–0	New York Rangers	Maple Leaf Gardens	Recap
Gerry Couture (4) – pp – 14:14; George Gee (3) – pp – 19:08		First period	No scoring
Sid Abel (2) – 19:16		Second period	No scoring
Marty Pavelich (3) – 16:55		Third period	No scoring
Harry Lumley		Goalie stats	Chuck Rayner

April 18	New York Rangers	4–3	OT	Detroit Red Wings	Olympia Stadium	Recap
No scoring		First period		06:31 – Ted Lindsay (1); 16:48 – Sid Abel (3)
Buddy O'Connor (3) – 19:59		Second period		No scoring
Marty Pavelich (4) – 03:32; Edgar Laprade (3) – 08:09		Third period		16:26 – Gus Kyle (1)
Don Raleigh (3) – 08:34		First overtime period		No scoring
Chuck Rayner		Goalie stats		Harry Lumley

April 20	New York Rangers	2–1	OT	Detroit Red Wings	Olympia Stadium	Recap
No scoring		First period		No scoring
Dunc Fisher (2) – 07:44		Second period		No scoring
No scoring		Third period		18:10 – Ted Lindsay (2)
Don Raleigh (4) – 01:38		First overtime period		No scoring
Chuck Rayner		Goalie stats		Harry Lumley

April 22	New York Rangers	4–5	Detroit Red Wings	Olympia Stadium	Recap
Allan Stanley (1) – 03:45; Dunc Fisher (3) – 07:35		First period	19:18 – Ted Lindsay (3)
Pentti Lund (6) – pp – 03:18		Second period	05:38 – Sid Abel (4); 16:07 – Gerry Couture (5)
Tony Leswick (1) – 01:54		Third period	04:13 – Ted Lindsay (4); 10:34 – Sid Abel (5)
Chuck Rayner		Goalie stats	Harry Lumley

April 23	New York Rangers	3–4	2OT	Detroit Red Wings	Olympia Stadium	Recap
Allan Stanley (2) – pp – 11:14; Tony Leswick (2) – pp – 12:18		First period		No scoring
Buddy O'Connor (4) – 11:42		Second period		05:09 – pp – Pete Babando (1); 05:30 – pp – Sid Abel (6); 15:57 – Jim McFadden (2)
No scoring		Third period		No scoring
No scoring		Second overtime period		08:31 – Pete Babando (2)
Chuck Rayner		Goalie stats		Harry Lumley

Detroit won series 4–3

== Awards ==
This was the last season that the O'Brien Cup was awarded to the Stanley Cup runner up – in this season, the New York Rangers – as it went into retirement for the second and final time at season's end. (It was not awarded between 1917 and 1921)

O'Brien Cup: (Stanley Cup runner-up)	New York Rangers
Prince of Wales Trophy: (Top record, regular season)	Detroit Red Wings
Art Ross Trophy: (Top scorer)	Ted Lindsay, Detroit Red Wings
Calder Memorial Trophy: (Top first year player)	Jack Gelineau, Boston Bruins
Hart Trophy: (Most valuable player)	Charlie Rayner, New York Rangers
Lady Byng Memorial Trophy: (Excellence and sportsmanship)	Edgar Laprade, New York Rangers
Vezina Trophy: (Goaltender of team with best goals against average)	Bill Durnan, Montreal Canadiens

=== All-Star teams ===
First Team	Position	Second Team
Bill Durnan, Montreal Canadiens	G	Chuck Rayner, New York Rangers
Gus Mortson, Toronto Maple Leafs	D	Leo Reise Jr., Detroit Red Wings
Ken Reardon, Montreal Canadiens	D	Red Kelly, Detroit Red Wings
Sid Abel, Detroit Red Wings	C	Ted Kennedy, Toronto Maple Leafs
Maurice Richard, Montreal Canadiens	RW	Gordie Howe, Detroit Red Wings
Ted Lindsay, Detroit Red Wings	LW	Tony Leswick, New York Rangers

== Player statistics ==
=== Scoring leaders ===
Note: GP = Games played, G = Goals, A = Assists, PTS = Points, PIM = Penalties in minutes

PLAYER	TEAM	GP	G	A	PTS	PIM
Ted Lindsay	Detroit Red Wings	69	23	55	78	141
Sid Abel	Detroit Red Wings	69	34	35	69	46
Gordie Howe	Detroit Red Wings	70	35	33	68	69
Maurice Richard	Montreal Canadiens	70	43	22	65	114
Paul Ronty	Boston Bruins	70	23	36	59	8
Roy Conacher	Chicago Black Hawks	70	25	31	56	16
Doug Bentley	Chicago Black Hawks	64	20	33	53	28
Johnny Peirson	Boston Bruins	57	27	25	52	49
Metro Prystai	Chicago Black Hawks	65	29	22	51	31
Bep Guidolin	Chicago Black Hawks	70	17	34	51	42

Source: NHL

=== Leading goaltenders ===
Note: GP = Games played; Mins – Minutes played; GA = Goals against; GAA = Goals against average; W = Wins; L = Losses; T = Ties; SO = Shutouts

Player	Team	GP	Mins	GA	GAA	W	L	T	SO
Bill Durnan	Montreal Canadiens	64	3840	141	2.20	26	21	17	8
Harry Lumley	Detroit Red Wings	63	3780	148	2.35	33	16	14	7
Turk Broda	Toronto Maple Leafs	68	4040	167	2.48	30	25	12	9
Chuck Rayner	New York Rangers	69	4140	181	2.62	28	30	11	6
Jack Gelineau	Boston Bruins	67	4020	220	3.28	22	30	15	3
Frank Brimsek	Chicago Black Hawks	70	4200	244	3.49	22	38	10	5

== Coaches ==
- Boston Bruins: Georges Boucher
- Chicago Black Hawks: Charlie Conacher
- Detroit Red Wings: Tommy Ivan
- Montreal Canadiens: Dick Irvin
- New York Rangers: Lynn Patrick
- Toronto Maple Leafs: Hap Day

== Debuts ==
The following is a list of players of note who played their first NHL game in 1949–50 (listed with their first team, asterisk(*) marks debut in playoffs):

- Jack McIntyre, Boston Bruins
- Red Sullivan, Boston Bruins
- Johnny Wilson, Detroit Red Wings
- Terry Sawchuk, Detroit Red Wings
- Marcel Pronovost*, Detroit Red Wings
- Al Rollins, Toronto Maple Leafs
- George Armstrong, Toronto Maple Leafs
- Tim Horton, Toronto Maple Leafs

== Last games ==
The following is a list of players of note that played their last game in the NHL in 1949–50 (listed with their last team):

- Jack Crawford, Boston Bruins
- Bud Poile, Boston Bruins
- Frank Brimsek, Chicago Black Hawks
- Ken Reardon, Montreal Canadiens
- Grant Warwick, Montreal Canadiens
- Bill Durnan, Montreal Canadiens
- Garth Boesch, Toronto Maple Leafs

== See also ==
- 1949-50 NHL transactions
- List of Stanley Cup champions
- 3rd National Hockey League All-Star Game
- National Hockey League All-Star Game
- 1949 in sports
- 1950 in sports
