= 1952 Stanley Cup Final =

1952 ice hockey championship series

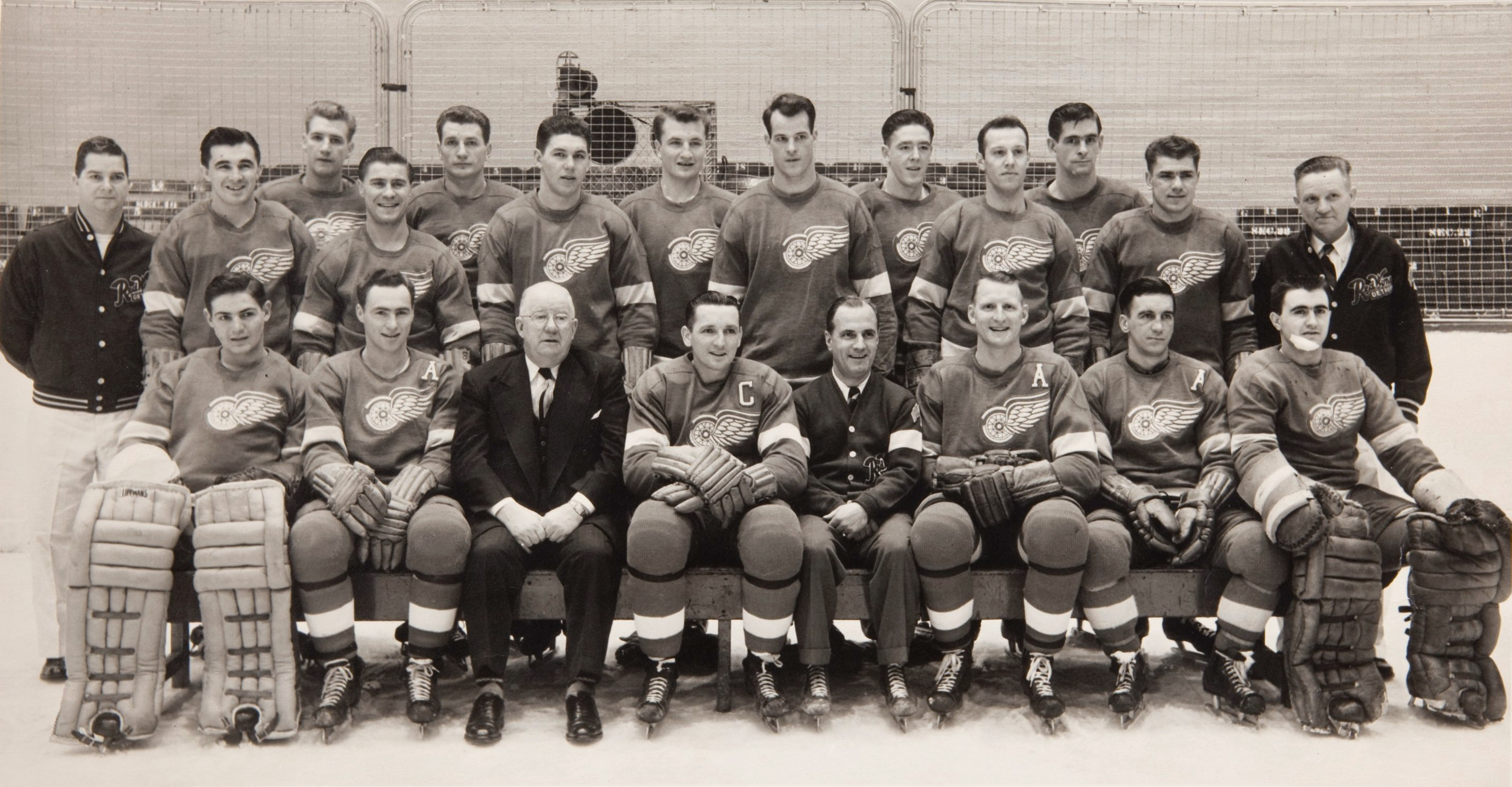
- Team photo of the 1951–52 Detroit Red Wings
	1	2	3	4	Total
Detroit Red Wings	3	2	3	3	4
Montreal Canadiens	1	1	0	0	0
- Location(s): Montreal: Montreal Forum (1, 2); Detroit: Olympia Stadium (3, 4)
- Coaches: Detroit: Tommy Ivan; Montreal: Dick Irvin
- Captains: Detroit: Sid Abel; Montreal: Emile Bouchard
- Dates: April 10–15, 1952
- Series-winning goal: Metro Prystai (6:50, first)
- Hall of Famers: Red Wings: Sid Abel (1969); Alex Delvecchio (1977); Gordie Howe (1972); Red Kelly (1969); Ted Lindsay (1966); Marcel Pronovost (1978); Terry Sawchuk (1971); Canadiens: Emile Bouchard (1966); Bernie Geoffrion (1972); Doug Harvey (1973); Tom Johnson (1970); Elmer Lach (1966); Dickie Moore (1974); Bert Olmstead (1985); Maurice Richard (1961); Coaches: Dick Irvin (1958, player); Tommy Ivan (1974)

The 1952 Stanley Cup Final was contested by the Detroit Red Wings and the Montreal Canadiens in the first of the four Detroit–Montreal Stanley Cup Final series of the 1950s. The Canadiens were appearing in their second straight Finals series, while Detroit was returning after winning in 1950.

The Red Wings swept the Canadiens in four games, shutting them out twice and allowing one goal in each of the other two games. The Red Wings had also swept the Toronto Maple Leafs to reach the Finals, becoming the first team to go 8–0 in an NHL postseason, and became the first undefeated NHL playoff team since the 1928–29 Boston Bruins went 5–0.

== Paths to the Finals ==
Detroit defeated the defending champion Toronto Maple Leafs 4–0 to reach the Finals. Montreal defeated the Boston Bruins 4–3 to reach the Finals.

== Game summaries ==
Terry Sawchuk posted two shutouts in his Cup Finals debut. Gordie Howe scored two goals in his Cup Finals debut. The Red Wings went through the playoffs perfect, a feat that has been replicated only once since: in 1960, the Canadiens went 8–0 against first the Chicago Black Hawks and then the Maple Leafs en route to their record fifth consecutive Stanley Cup.

April 10	Detroit Red Wings	3–1	Montreal Canadiens	Montreal Forum	Recap
No scoring		First period	No scoring
Tony Leswick (2) - 3:27		Second period	No scoring
Tony Leswick (3) - 7:59; Ted Lindsay (3) - en - 19:44		Third period	11:01 - Tom Johnson (1)
Terry Sawchuck		Goalie stats	Gerry McNeil

April 12	Detroit Red Wings	2–1	Montreal Canadiens	Montreal Forum	Recap
Marty Pavelich (2) - 16:09		First period	18:37 - pp - Elmer Lach (1)
Ted Lindsay (4) - pp - 00:43		Second period	No scoring
No scoring		Third period	No scoring
Terry Sawchuck		Goalie stats	Gerry McNeil

April 13	Montreal Canadiens	0–3	Detroit Red Wings	Olympia Stadium	Recap
No scoring		First period	4:31 - pp - Gordie Howe (1)
No scoring		Second period	9:13 - Ted Lindsay (5)
No scoring		Third period	6:54 - Gordie Howe (2)
Gerry McNeil		Goalie stats	Terry Sawchuck

April 15	Montreal Canadiens	0–3	Detroit Red Wings	Olympia Stadium	Recap
No scoring		First period	6:50 - pp - Metro Prystai (1)
No scoring		Second period	19:39 - Glen Skov (1)
No scoring		Third period	7:35 - Metro Prystai (2)
Gerry McNeil		Goalie stats	Terry Sawchuck

Detroit won series 4–0

== Stanley Cup engraving ==
The 1952 Stanley Cup was presented to Red Wings captain Sid Abel by NHL President Clarence Campbell following the Red Wings 3–0 win over the Canadiens in game four.

The following Red Wings players and staff had their names engraved on the Stanley Cup

1951–52 Detroit Red Wings

=== Players ===
Centres

- 10 Metro Prystai
- 12 Sid Abel (Captain)
- 14 Glen Skov
- 15 Alex Delvecchio
- 16 Fred Glover

Wingers

- 7 Ted Lindsay (A)
- 8 Tony Leswick
- 9 Gordie Howe
- 11 Marty Pavelich
- 16 Enio Sclisizzi †
- 17 John Wilson
- 22 Vic Stasiuk

Defencemen

- 2 Bob Goldham
- 3 Benny Woit
- 4 Leonard Red Kelly (A)
- 5 Leo Reise Jr. (A)
- 18 Marcel Pronovost
- 19 Larry Zeidel
- Hugh Coflin*

Goaltenders

- 1 Terry Sawchuk
- Bill Tibbs*
- Glenn Hall*

* Did not play in Finals.
† Name not included when cup was redone during 1957-58 season.

=== Coaching and administrative staff ===
- James E. Norris Sr. (President/Owner), James D. Norris Jr. (Vice President/Owner)
- Bruce Norris (Vice Presidents/Owner), Jack Adams (Manager)
- Fred Huber Jr. (Publicity Director), Tommy Ivan (Coach)
- Carson Cooper (Chief Scout), Carl Mattson (Trainer)
- Ross Lefty Wilson (Asst. Trainer), Wally Crossman (Asst. Trainer/Stick Boy)

=== Stanley Cup engraving ===
- * Three players were engraved on the Stanley Cup but did not play in any games when on Detroit's roster. Glenn Hall played his first NHL game in the 1952–53 Season. Bill Tibbs never played a game when in the NHL. Hugh Coflin never played in any games when he was with Detroit. Coflin's only NHL Season was 1950–51 when he played 31 games for the Chicago Blackhawks.
- Glenn Hall was listed as GLEN HALL on the original 1952 engraving. When the cup was redone in 1957–58, Hall was engraved on the Stanley Cup as GLIN HALL, a mistake that was repeated on the Replica Cup created in 1992–93. He was engraved before he played in his first NHL game in the 1952–53 season. Glenn Hall went on to play a record 502 consecutive complete games. Hall would win Rookie of the Year in 1956, becoming the 2nd player to have his name on the Stanley Cup, before winning the Calder Trophy (Rookie of the Year).
- † #16 Enio Sclisizzi (LW) did not have his name included when the cup was redone in 1957–58. He played only nine games and did not play in the playoffs.
- Coflin, Tibbs, and Hall, who did not play in any games when with Detroit in 1952, were included on the new version of the Stanley Cup. Coflin's name was not included on the Replica Stanley Cup created in 1993.

== See also ==
- 1951–52 NHL season

== Notes ==
Preceded by Toronto Maple Leafs; 1951	Detroit Red Wings; Stanley Cup champions 1952	Succeeded by Montreal Canadiens; 1953
