= Bill Tibbs =

Canadian ice hockey player (1931–2009)

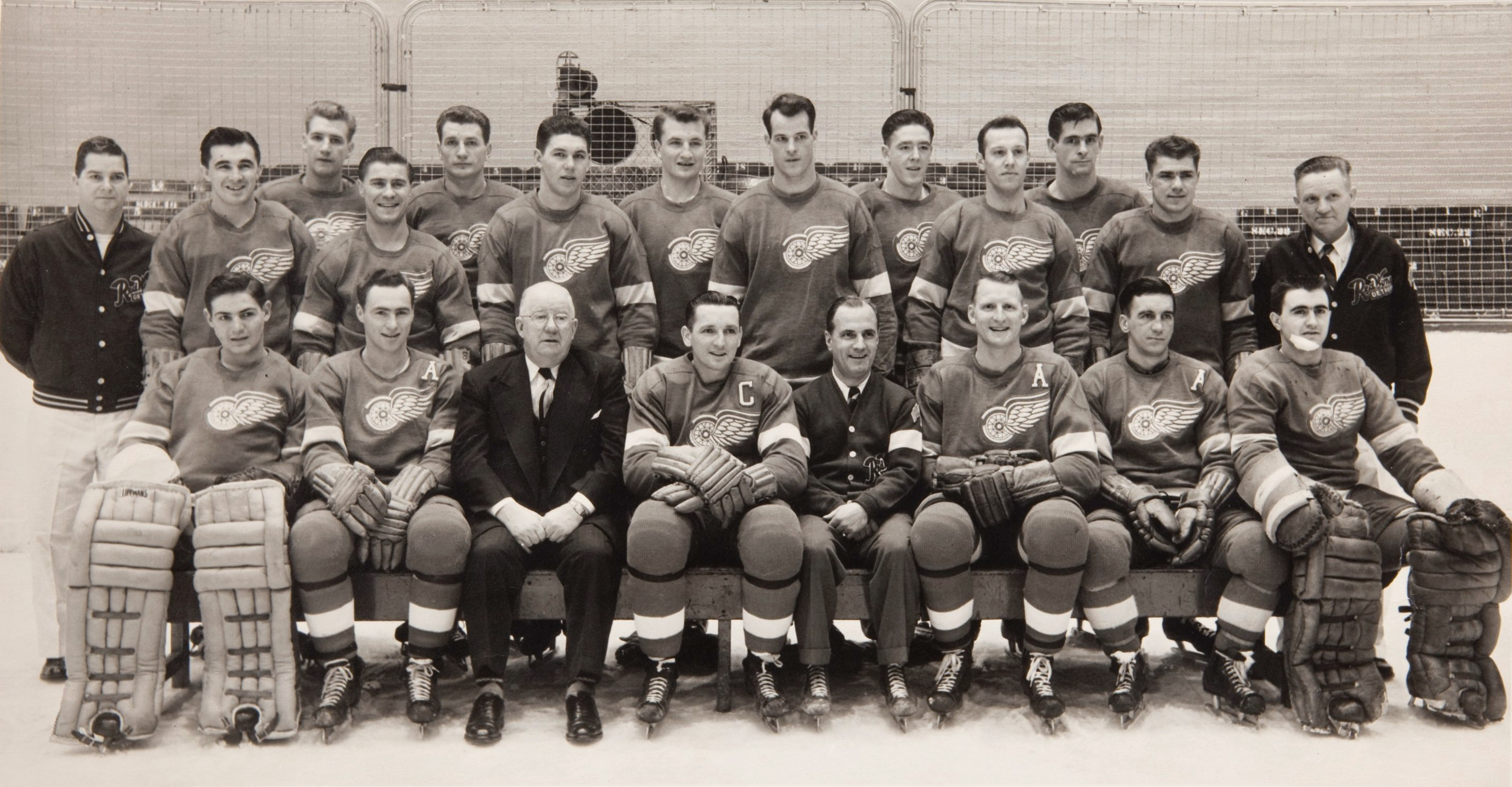
Team photo of the 1951–52 Detroit Red Wings with Tibbs at far right of the front row

William A. Tibbs (September 29, 1931 – September 18, 2009) was a Canadian professional ice hockey goaltender. He was listed at 5 feet 10 inches (1.78 m) and 175 pounds (79 kg).

== Playing career ==
Tibbs played junior ice hockey during the 1948–49 season, and his professional career spanned the 1949–50 season through the 1959–60 season. He played most of his career in the minor leagues, including stops with the Hershey Bears of the AHL, Troy Bruins of the IHL and the Omaha Knights of the USHL.

Tibbs served as the backup goaltender to Terry Sawchuk of the Detroit Red Wings during the National Hockey League (NHL) 1952 post-season, which saw the Red Wings sweep the Montreal Canadiens in the Stanley Cup Finals. As such, Tibbs had his name engraved on the Stanley Cup for that season. However, Tibbs never played a game in NHL.

Tibbs, playing for the Troy Bruins, won the IHL's James Norris Memorial Trophy for the fewest goals against during the 1955–56 regular season.

== Personal life ==
Tibbs was born and raised in Winnipeg, Manitoba. Outside of his professional sports career, he had a lengthy career in the insurance industry in Canada. Tibbs died in 2009, shortly before his 78th birthday, and was survived by his wife and three children.
