= 1951–52 Chicago Black Hawks season =

Sports season

1951–52 Chicago Black Hawks
- League: 6th NHL
- 1951–52 record: 17–44–9
- Home record: 9–19–7
- Road record: 8–25–2
- Goals for: 158
- Goals against: 241

Team information
- General manager: Bill Tobin
- Coach: Ebbie Goodfellow
- Captain: Jack Stewart
- Arena: Chicago Stadium

Team leaders
- Goals: Bill Mosienko (31)
- Assists: George Gee (31)
- Points: Bill Mosienko (53)
- Penalty minutes: Al Dewsbury (99)
- Wins: Harry Lumley (17)
- Goals against average: Harry Lumley (3.46)

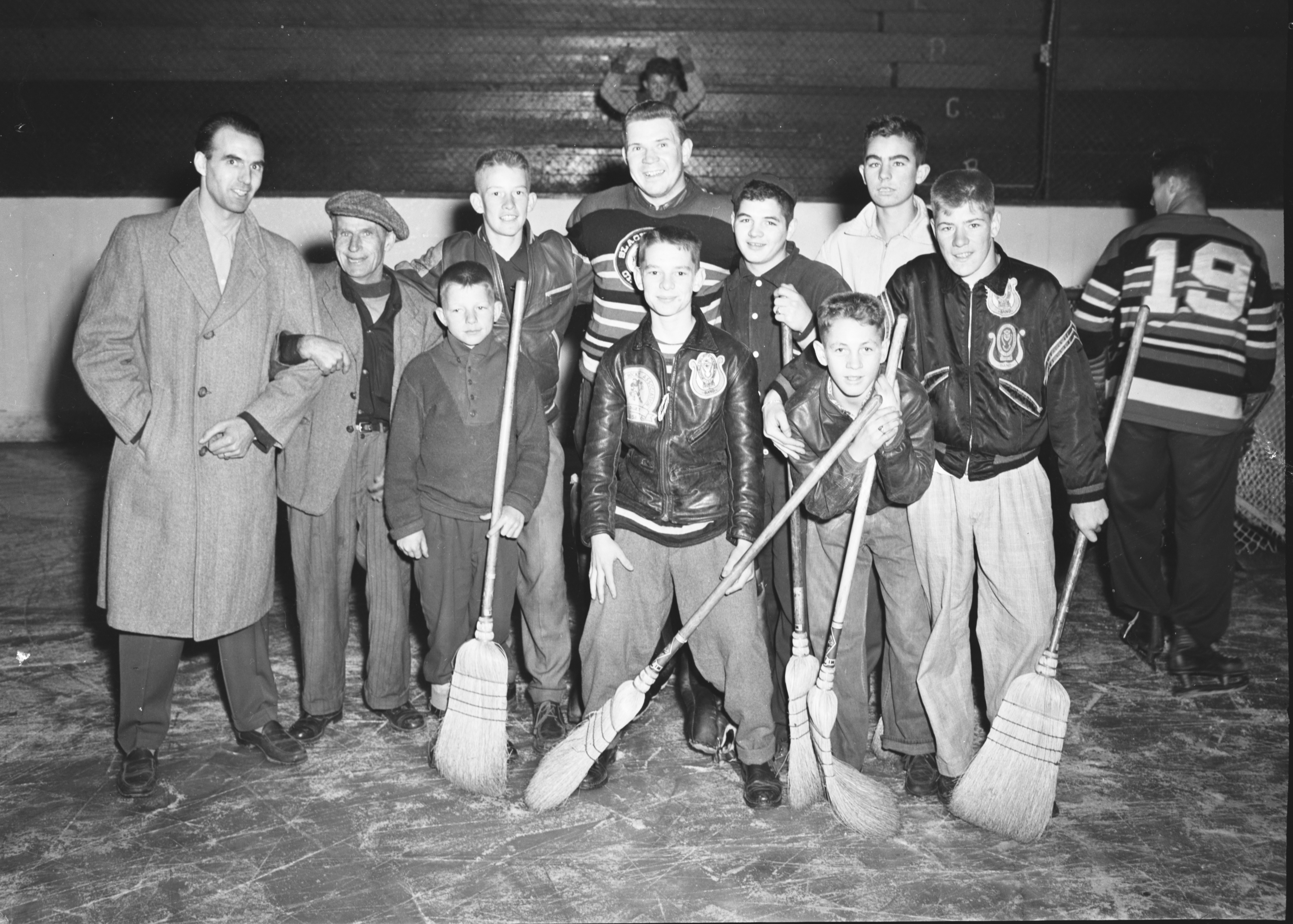
Chicago Black Hawks, c.1951

The 1951–52 Chicago Black Hawks season was the team's 26th season in the NHL, and they were coming off of a horrible season in 1950–51, when they finished with an NHL worst record of 13–47–10, earning 36 points, as Chicago missed the playoffs for the fifth straight season. The Black Hawks ended the 1950–51 season winning only two of their last 43 games. In 1951–52, Chicago finished marginally better, but did not qualify for the playoffs.

== Off-season ==
In the off-season, the Black Hawks were involved in the largest cash deal at the time, as they gave the Detroit Red Wings $75,000 in exchange for Jim McFadden, George Gee, Jimmy Peters, Clare Martin, Clare Raglan and Max McNab.

== Regular season ==
The Black Hawks started the season off playing .500 hockey through their opening eight games, as they sat with a 3–3–2 record, however, the team fell into a five-game losing streak, and quickly fell out of playoff contention. Chicago would slump all season long, ending up in last place in the league for the second consecutive season with a 17–44–9 record, earning 43 points, which was a seven-point improvement on the previous season.

In an early season matchup (November 24) against the Detroit Red Wings at the Detroit Olympia, Black Hawks captain Jack Stewart made his return to the team after missing nearly a year of action due to a back injury. The Black Hawks defeated the powerful Red Wings 6–2 in his return. The following night in Chicago, Chicago goaltender Harry Lumley suffered a minor knee injury. Team trainer Moe Roberts, who had first played in the NHL in 1925–26 with the Boston Bruins, and had not played in the league since 1933–34 with the New York Americans, was an emergency third period replacement in goal for Chicago. Roberts stopped every shot he faced to help the Hawks win the game.

With the team having some attendance problems, the Black Hawks decided to experiment with afternoon games, and it worked, as on January 20, 1952, the Hawks had a season high crowd of 13,600 in a game against the Toronto Maple Leafs.

Black Hawks forward Bill Mosienko set an NHL record during Chicago's final game of the season at Madison Square Garden in New York, as he scored 3 goals on New York Rangers goaltender Lorne Anderson in 21 seconds as Chicago defeated New York 7–6.

Offensively, Bill Mosienko led the team with 31 goals and 53 points, while newly acquired George Gee had a club high 31 assists, and finished second in team scoring with 49 points. Al Dewsbury led the Black Hawks blueline, scoring 7 goals and earning 24 points, while posting a team high 99 penalty minutes, while fellow defenceman Bill Gadsby also had a solid season, scoring 7 goals, registering 22 points and accumulated 87 penalty minutes.

In goal, Harry Lumley played in all 70 games, winning 17 of them, while posting a GAA of 3.46, and earning 2 shutouts.

=== Season standings ===
National Hockey League
		GP	W	L	T	GF	GA	DIFF	Pts
1	Detroit Red Wings	70	44	14	12	215	133	+82	100
2	Montreal Canadiens	70	34	26	10	195	164	+31	78
3	Toronto Maple Leafs	70	29	25	16	168	157	+11	74
4	Boston Bruins	70	25	29	16	162	176	−14	66
5	New York Rangers	70	23	34	13	192	219	−27	59
6	Chicago Black Hawks	70	17	44	9	158	241	−83	43

=== Record vs. opponents ===
1951–52 NHL Records
Team	BOS	CHI	DET	MTL	NYR	TOR
Boston	—	9–3–2	3–8–3	7–5–2	4–6–4	2–7–5
Chicago	3–9–2	—	2–12	1–10–3	5–7–2	6–6–2
Detroit	8–3–3	12–2	—	9–2–3	9–3–2	6–4–4
Montreal	5–7–2	10–1–3	2–9–3	—	9–4–1	8–5–1
New York	6–4–4	7–5–2	3–9–2	4–9–1	—	3–7–4
Toronto	7–2–5	6–6–2	4–6–4	5–8–1	7–3–4	—

== Schedule and results ==
1951–52 regular season
October

Game	Date	Visitor	Score	Home	Record	Points
1	October 11	Chicago Black Hawks	2–4	Montreal Canadiens	0–1–0	0
2	October 13	Chicago Black Hawks	3–1	Toronto Maple Leafs	1–1–0	2
3	October 14	New York Rangers	2–3	Chicago Black Hawks	2–1–0	4
4	October 18	Detroit Red Wings	6–1	Chicago Black Hawks	2–2–0	4
5	October 21	Toronto Maple Leafs	1–1	Chicago Black Hawks	2–2–1	5
6	October 25	Montreal Canadiens	2–2	Chicago Black Hawks	2–2–2	6
7	October 28	Boston Bruins	2–0	Chicago Black Hawks	2–3–2	6

November

Game	Date	Visitor	Score	Home	Record	Points
8	November 1	New York Rangers	2–4	Chicago Black Hawks	3–3–2	8
9	November 4	Boston Bruins	4–2	Chicago Black Hawks	3–4–2	8
10	November 7	Chicago Black Hawks	0–1	Toronto Maple Leafs	3–5–2	8
11	November 8	Toronto Maple Leafs	3–1	Chicago Black Hawks	3–6–2	8
12	November 10	Chicago Black Hawks	2–4	Montreal Canadiens	3–7–2	8
13	November 11	Chicago Black Hawks	2–3	New York Rangers	3–8–2	8
14	November 13	Chicago Black Hawks	3–1	Boston Bruins	4–8–2	10
15	November 15	Chicago Black Hawks	1–3	Detroit Red Wings	4–9–2	10
16	November 18	Toronto Maple Leafs	0–1	Chicago Black Hawks	5–9–2	12
17	November 21	Chicago Black Hawks	1–5	Toronto Maple Leafs	5–10–2	12
18	November 22	Montreal Canadiens	1–5	Chicago Black Hawks	6–10–2	14
19	November 24	Chicago Black Hawks	6–2	Detroit Red Wings	7–10–2	16
20	November 25	Detroit Red Wings	5–2	Chicago Black Hawks	7–11–2	16
21	November 28	Chicago Black Hawks	3–6	New York Rangers	7–12–2	16

December

Game	Date	Visitor	Score	Home	Record	Points
22	December 1	Chicago Black Hawks	2–4	Montreal Canadiens	7–13–2	16
23	December 2	New York Rangers	4–6	Chicago Black Hawks	8–13–2	18
24	December 4	Chicago Black Hawks	1–3	Boston Bruins	8–14–2	18
25	December 8	Chicago Black Hawks	1–3	Toronto Maple Leafs	8–15–2	18
26	December 9	Boston Bruins	3–4	Chicago Black Hawks	9–15–2	20
27	December 13	Montreal Canadiens	1–1	Chicago Black Hawks	9–15–3	21
28	December 15	Chicago Black Hawks	0–3	Detroit Red Wings	9–16–3	21
29	December 16	Toronto Maple Leafs	3–4	Chicago Black Hawks	10–16–3	23
30	December 20	Detroit Red Wings	6–4	Chicago Black Hawks	10–17–3	23
31	December 22	Chicago Black Hawks	1–5	Montreal Canadiens	10–18–3	23
32	December 23	Chicago Black Hawks	2–3	New York Rangers	10–19–3	23
33	December 25	Chicago Black Hawks	6–2	Boston Bruins	11–19–3	25
34	December 29	Chicago Black Hawks	1–3	Detroit Red Wings	11–20–3	25

January

Game	Date	Visitor	Score	Home	Record	Points
35	January 1	Montreal Canadiens	3–0	Chicago Black Hawks	11–21–3	25
36	January 5	Chicago Black Hawks	1–2	Toronto Maple Leafs	11–22–3	25
37	January 6	Chicago Black Hawks	2–3	New York Rangers	11–23–3	25
38	January 8	Boston Bruins	7–2	Chicago Black Hawks	11–24–3	25
39	January 12	Chicago Black Hawks	3–8	Montreal Canadiens	11–25–3	25
40	January 13	Chicago Black Hawks	4–5	Boston Bruins	11–26–3	25
41	January 16	Chicago Black Hawks	6–4	New York Rangers	12–26–3	27
42	January 17	New York Rangers	6–6	Chicago Black Hawks	12–26–4	28
43	January 20	Toronto Maple Leafs	3–1	Chicago Black Hawks	12–27–4	28
44	January 24	Montreal Canadiens	4–1	Chicago Black Hawks	12–28–4	28
45	January 26	Chicago Black Hawks	3–2	Detroit Red Wings	13–28–4	30
46	January 27	Detroit Red Wings	2–0	Chicago Black Hawks	13–29–4	30
47	January 31	Boston Bruins	0–0	Chicago Black Hawks	13–29–5	31

February

Game	Date	Visitor	Score	Home	Record	Points
48	February 3	Toronto Maple Leafs	1–3	Chicago Black Hawks	14–29–5	33
49	February 5	Chicago Black Hawks	0–5	Boston Bruins	14–30–5	33
50	February 7	New York Rangers	3–1	Chicago Black Hawks	14–31–5	33
51	February 10	Montreal Canadiens	3–2	Chicago Black Hawks	14–32–5	33
52	February 14	Detroit Red Wings	3–2	Chicago Black Hawks	14–33–5	33
53	February 16	Chicago Black Hawks	2–2	Toronto Maple Leafs	14–33–6	34
54	February 17	Boston Bruins	5–2	Chicago Black Hawks	14–34–6	34
55	February 21	Toronto Maple Leafs	1–5	Chicago Black Hawks	15–34–6	36
56	February 23	Chicago Black Hawks	0–7	Montreal Canadiens	15–35–6	36
57	February 24	Detroit Red Wings	2–1	Chicago Black Hawks	15–36–6	36
58	February 28	New York Rangers	2–2	Chicago Black Hawks	15–36–7	37

March

Game	Date	Visitor	Score	Home	Record	Points
59	March 2	Montreal Canadiens	6–4	Chicago Black Hawks	15–37–7	37
60	March 3	Chicago Black Hawks	2–3	Detroit Red Wings	15–38–7	37
61	March 6	New York Rangers	5–3	Chicago Black Hawks	15–39–7	37
62	March 8	Chicago Black Hawks	4–4	Montreal Canadiens	15–39–8	38
63	March 9	Chicago Black Hawks	2–4	Boston Bruins	15–40–8	38
64	March 12	Chicago Black Hawks	2–10	New York Rangers	15–41–8	38
65	March 13	Boston Bruins	3–3	Chicago Black Hawks	15–41–9	39
66	March 15	Chicago Black Hawks	1–6	Detroit Red Wings	15–42–9	39
67	March 16	Detroit Red Wings	4–0	Chicago Black Hawks	15–43–9	39
68	March 18	Chicago Black Hawks	0–4	Boston Bruins	15–44–9	39
69	March 22	Chicago Black Hawks	3–2	Toronto Maple Leafs	16–44–9	41
70	March 23	Chicago Black Hawks	7–6	New York Rangers	17–44–9	43

Legend: Win (2 points) Loss (0 points) Tie (1 point)

== Player statistics ==
=== Scoring leaders ===
Player	GP	G	A	Pts	PIM
Bill Mosienko	70	31	22	53	10
George Gee	70	18	31	49	39
Gus Bodnar	69	14	26	40	26
Jimmy Peters	70	15	21	36	16
Jim McFadden	70	10	24	34	14

=== Goaltending ===
Player	GP	TOI	W	L	T	GA	SO	GAA
Moe Roberts	1	20	0	0	0	0	0	0.00
Harry Lumley	70	4180	17	44	9	241	2	3.46
