= 1951–52 New York Rangers season =

NHL hockey team season

1951–52 New York Rangers
- League: 5th NHL
- 1951–52 record: 23–34–13
- Home record: 16–13–6
- Road record: 7–21–7
- Goals for: 192
- Goals against: 219

Team information
- General manager: Frank Boucher
- Coach: Neil Colville; Bill Cook
- Captain: Allan Stanley
- Arena: Madison Square Garden

Team leaders
- Goals: Wally Hergesheimer (26)
- Assists: Don Raleigh (42)
- Points: Don Raleigh (61)
- Penalty minutes: Hy Buller (96)
- Wins: Chuck Rayner (18)
- Goals against average: Emile Francis/Chuck Raynor (3.00)

The 1951–52 New York Rangers season was the franchise's 26th season. The Rangers compiled a 23–34–13 record during the regular season, and finished with 59 points. Their fifth-place finish caused them to miss the NHL playoffs for the second year in a row for the first time since the 1945–46 and 1946–47 seasons.

== Regular season ==
=== Final standings ===
National Hockey League
		GP	W	L	T	GF	GA	DIFF	Pts
1	Detroit Red Wings	70	44	14	12	215	133	+82	100
2	Montreal Canadiens	70	34	26	10	195	164	+31	78
3	Toronto Maple Leafs	70	29	25	16	168	157	+11	74
4	Boston Bruins	70	25	29	16	162	176	−14	66
5	New York Rangers	70	23	34	13	192	219	−27	59
6	Chicago Black Hawks	70	17	44	9	158	241	−83	43

=== Record vs. opponents ===
1951–52 NHL Records
Team	BOS	CHI	DET	MTL	NYR	TOR
Boston	—	9–3–2	3–8–3	7–5–2	4–6–4	2–7–5
Chicago	3–9–2	—	2–12	1–10–3	5–7–2	6–6–2
Detroit	8–3–3	12–2	—	9–2–3	9–3–2	6–4–4
Montreal	5–7–2	10–1–3	2–9–3	—	9–4–1	8–5–1
New York	6–4–4	7–5–2	3–9–2	4–9–1	—	3–7–4
Toronto	7–2–5	6–6–2	4–6–4	5–8–1	7–3–4	—

== Schedule and results ==
1951–52 regular season
October: 2–4–1 (home: 1–1–0; road: 1–3–1)

Game	October	Opponent	Score	Record
1	14	@ Chicago Black Hawks	3–2	0–1–0
2	18	@ Montreal Canadiens	3–2	0–2–0
3	20	@ Toronto Maple Leafs	3–2	1–2–0
4	21	@ Boston Bruins	1–1	1–2–1
5	24	Boston Bruins	3–1	1–3–1
6	28	Montreal Canadiens	2–1	2–3–1
7	29	@ Montreal Canadiens	6–1	2–4–1

November: 4–5–4 (home: 3–1–3; road: 1–4–1)

Game	November	Opponent	Score	Record
8	1	@ Chicago Black Hawks	4–2	2–5–1
9	3	@ Toronto Maple Leafs	2–1	3–5–1
10	4	@ Detroit Red Wings	4–2	3–6–1
11	7	Detroit Red Wings	4–4	3–6–2
12	11	Chicago Black Hawks	3–2	4–6–2
13	14	Toronto Maple Leafs	2–2	4–6–3
14	17	@ Montreal Canadiens	3–2	4–7–3
15	18	Detroit Red Wings	5–2	4–8–3
16	21	Boston Bruins	3–3	4–8–4
17	22	@ Detroit Red Wings	2–1	4–9–4
18	25	Montreal Canadiens	2–1	5–9–4
19	27	@ Boston Bruins	1–1	5–9–5
20	28	Chicago Black Hawks	6–3	6–9–5

December: 5–8–1 (home: 5–2–1; road: 0–6–0)

Game	December	Opponent	Score	Record
21	1	@ Toronto Maple Leafs	8–2	6–10–5
22	2	@ Chicago Black Hawks	6–4	6–11–5
23	5	Boston Bruins	3–2	6–12–5
24	9	Toronto Maple Leafs	7–2	7–12–5
25	11	@ Boston Bruins	4–2	7–13–5
26	12	Boston Bruins	6–3	8–13–5
27	15	@ Toronto Maple Leafs	4–1	8–14–5
28	16	Detroit Red Wings	3–1	8–15–5
29	19	Montreal Canadiens	4–2	9–15–5
30	23	Chicago Black Hawks	3–2	10–15–5
31	25	@ Detroit Red Wings	2–1	10–16–5
32	26	Detroit Red Wings	1–0	11–16–5
33	29	@ Montreal Canadiens	7–2	11–17–5
34	30	Toronto Maple Leafs	2–2	11–17–6

January: 4–5–4 (home: 2–3–1; road: 2–2–3)

Game	January	Opponent	Score	Record
35	1	@ Boston Bruins	4–2	12–17–6
36	2	Detroit Red Wings	1–0	13–17–6
37	6	Chicago Black Hawks	3–2	14–17–6
38	9	Toronto Maple Leafs	2–1	14–18–6
39	10	@ Detroit Red Wings	5–2	14–19–6
40	13	Montreal Canadiens	2–2	14–19–7
41	16	Chicago Black Hawks	6–4	14–20–7
42	17	@ Chicago Black Hawks	6–6	14–20–8
43	20	@ Detroit Red Wings	3–2	15–20–8
44	22	@ Boston Bruins	3–3	15–20–9
45	26	@ Toronto Maple Leafs	3–3	15–20–10
46	27	Montreal Canadiens	5–3	15–21–10
47	31	@ Montreal Canadiens	1–0	15–22–10

February: 5–4–3 (home: 3–2–1; road: 2–2–2)

Game	February	Opponent	Score	Record
48	3	@ Detroit Red Wings	4–3	15–23–10
49	7	@ Chicago Black Hawks	3–1	16–23–10
50	9	@ Boston Bruins	4–2	17–23–10
51	10	Toronto Maple Leafs	4–3	17–24–10
52	13	Boston Bruins	6–2	18–24–10
53	16	@ Montreal Canadiens	5–1	18–25–10
54	17	Montreal Canadiens	3–2	19–25–10
55	19	@ Toronto Maple Leafs	3–3	19–25–11
56	20	Detroit Red Wings	1–1	19–25–12
57	24	Boston Bruins	5–2	20–25–12
58	27	Toronto Maple Leafs	3–1	20–26–12
59	28	@ Chicago Black Hawks	2–2	20–26–13

March: 3–8–0 (home: 2–4–0; road: 1–4–0)

Game	March	Opponent	Score	Record
60	1	@ Montreal Canadiens	3–1	20–27–13
61	2	Detroit Red Wings	6–4	20–28–13
62	4	@ Boston Bruins	4–1	20–29–13
63	6	@ Chicago Black Hawks	5–3	21–29–13
64	9	Montreal Canadiens	2–0	21–30–13
65	12	Chicago Black Hawks	10–2	22–30–13
66	15	@ Toronto Maple Leafs	5–2	22–31–13
67	16	Toronto Maple Leafs	4–2	22–32–13
68	19	Boston Bruins	6–4	23–32–13
69	20	@ Detroit Red Wings	7–3	23–33–13
70	23	Chicago Black Hawks	7–6	23–34–13

Legend: Win (2 points) Loss (0 points) Tie (1 point)

== Player statistics ==
Skaters

Regular season
Player	GP	G	A	Pts	PIM
Don Raleigh	70	19	42	61	14
Ed Slowinski	64	21	22	43	18
Paul Ronty	65	12	31	43	16
Gaye Stewart	69	15	25	40	22
Wally Hergesheimer	68	26	12	38	6
Edgar Laprade	70	9	29	38	8
Hy Buller	68	12	23	35	96
Reggie Sinclair	69	20	10	30	33
Herb Dickenson	37	14	13	27	8
Ed Kullman	64	11	10	21	59
Nick Mickoski	43	7	13	20	20
Allan Stanley	50	5	14	19	52
Steve Kraftcheck	58	8	9	17	30
Jim Ross	51	2	9	11	25
Frank Eddolls	42	3	5	8	18
Jack Evans	52	1	6	7	83
Jack Stoddard	20	4	2	6	2
Jackie McLeod	13	2	3	5	2
Zellio Toppazzini	16	1	1	2	4
Clare Martin^{†}	14	0	1	1	6
Jim Conacher^{†}	16	0	1	1	2
Lloyd Ailsby	3	0	0	0	2

Goaltenders

Regular season
Player	GP	TOI	W	L	T	GA	GAA	SO
Chuck Rayner	53	3180	18	25	10	159	3.00	2
Emile Francis	14	840	4	7	3	42	3.00	0
Lorne Anderson	3	180	1	2	0	18	6.00	0

^{†}Denotes player spent time with another team before joining Rangers. Stats reflect time with Rangers only.
^{‡}Traded mid-season. Stats reflect time with Rangers only.

Note:

Pos = Position;GP = Games played; G = Goals; A = Assists; Pts = Points; PIM = Penalty minutes; +/- = Plus/minus; PPG = Power-play goals; SHG = Short-handed goals; GWG = Game-winning goals
Pos = Position;GP = Games played; Min, TOI = Minutes played; W = Wins; L = Losses; T,T/OT = Ties; OTL = Overtime losses; GA = Goals-against; GAA = Goals-against average; SO = Shutouts; SA = Shots against; SV = Shots saved;SV% = Save percentage;

== See also ==
- 1951–52 NHL season
