= 1951–52 Detroit Red Wings season =

Sports season

1951–52 Detroit Red Wings
- Stanley Cup champions
- Prince of Wales Trophy winners
- League: 1st NHL
- 1951–52 record: 44–14–12
- Home record: 24–7–4
- Road record: 20–7–8
- Goals for: 215
- Goals against: 133

Team information
- General manager: Jack Adams
- Coach: Tommy Ivan
- Captain: Sid Abel
- Alternate captains: Red Kelly; Ted Lindsay; Leo Reise Jr.
- Arena: Olympia Stadium

Team leaders
- Goals: Gordie Howe (47)
- Assists: Ted Lindsay (39); Gordie Howe (39)
- Points: Gordie Howe (86)
- Penalty minutes: Ted Lindsay (123)
- Wins: Terry Sawchuk (44)
- Goals against average: Terry Sawchuk (1.90)

The 1951–52 Detroit Red Wings season was the Red Wings' 26th season. The highlight of the Red Wings season was winning the Stanley Cup.

== Regular season ==
=== Final standings ===
National Hockey League
		GP	W	L	T	GF	GA	DIFF	Pts
1	Detroit Red Wings	70	44	14	12	215	133	+82	100
2	Montreal Canadiens	70	34	26	10	195	164	+31	78
3	Toronto Maple Leafs	70	29	25	16	168	157	+11	74
4	Boston Bruins	70	25	29	16	162	176	−14	66
5	New York Rangers	70	23	34	13	192	219	−27	59
6	Chicago Black Hawks	70	17	44	9	158	241	−83	43

=== Record vs. opponents ===
1951–52 NHL Records
Team	BOS	CHI	DET	MTL	NYR	TOR
Boston	—	9–3–2	3–8–3	7–5–2	4–6–4	2–7–5
Chicago	3–9–2	—	2–12	1–10–3	5–7–2	6–6–2
Detroit	8–3–3	12–2	—	9–2–3	9–3–2	6–4–4
Montreal	5–7–2	10–1–3	2–9–3	—	9–4–1	8–5–1
New York	6–4–4	7–5–2	3–9–2	4–9–1	—	3–7–4
Toronto	7–2–5	6–6–2	4–6–4	5–8–1	7–3–4	—

== Schedule and results ==
1951–52 regular season
October

Game	Result	Date	Score	Opponent	Record
1	W	October 11, 1951	1–0	Boston Bruins (1951–52)	1–0–0
2	L	October 14, 1951	2–3	Toronto Maple Leafs (1951–52)	1–1–0
3	W	October 18, 1951	6–1	@ Chicago Black Hawks (1951–52)	2–1–0
4	W	October 20, 1951	3–0	Montreal Canadiens (1951–52)	3–1–0
5	W	October 22, 1951	3–1	@ Montreal Canadiens (1951–52)	4–1–0
6	W	October 27, 1951	2–1	@ Toronto Maple Leafs (1951–52)	5–1–0
7	T	October 29, 1951	2–2	Toronto Maple Leafs (1951–52)	5–1–1

November

Game	Result	Date	Score	Opponent	Record
8	L	November 1, 1951	2–3	Boston Bruins (1951–52)	5–2–1
9	W	November 3, 1951	3–2	@ Montreal Canadiens (1951–52)	6–2–1
10	W	November 4, 1951	4–2	New York Rangers (1951–52)	7–2–1
11	T	November 6, 1951	0–0	@ Boston Bruins (1951–52)	7–2–2
12	T	November 7, 1951	4–4	@ New York Rangers (1951–52)	7–2–3
13	T	November 10, 1951	3–3	@ Toronto Maple Leafs (1951–52)	7–2–4
14	T	November 11, 1951	3–3	Montreal Canadiens (1951–52)	7–2–5
15	W	November 15, 1951	3–1	Chicago Black Hawks (1951–52)	8–2–5
16	W	November 18, 1951	5–2	@ New York Rangers (1951–52)	9–2–5
17	W	November 20, 1951	2–0	@ Boston Bruins (1951–52)	10–2–5
18	W	November 22, 1951	2–1	New York Rangers (1951–52)	11–2–5
19	L	November 24, 1951	2–6	Chicago Black Hawks (1951–52)	11–3–5
20	W	November 25, 1951	5–2	@ Chicago Black Hawks (1951–52)	12–3–5
21	T	November 29, 1951	1–1	Boston Bruins (1951–52)	12–3–6

December

Game	Result	Date	Score	Opponent	Record
22	L	December 2, 1951	1–2	Toronto Maple Leafs (1951–52)	12–4–6
23	T	December 5, 1951	2–2	@ Toronto Maple Leafs (1951–52)	12–4–7
24	W	December 8, 1951	3–0	@ Montreal Canadiens (1951–52)	13–4–7
25	W	December 9, 1951	3–2	Montreal Canadiens (1951–52)	14–4–7
26	W	December 13, 1951	3–1	Toronto Maple Leafs (1951–52)	15–4–7
27	W	December 15, 1951	3–0	Chicago Black Hawks (1951–52)	16–4–7
28	W	December 16, 1951	3–1	@ New York Rangers (1951–52)	17–4–7
29	T	December 18, 1951	5–5	@ Boston Bruins (1951–52)	17–4–8
30	W	December 20, 1951	6–4	@ Chicago Black Hawks (1951–52)	18–4–8
31	W	December 23, 1951	4–0	Montreal Canadiens (1951–52)	19–4–8
32	W	December 25, 1951	2–1	New York Rangers (1951–52)	20–4–8
33	L	December 26, 1951	0–1	@ New York Rangers (1951–52)	20–5–8
34	W	December 29, 1951	3–1	Chicago Black Hawks (1951–52)	21–5–8
35	L	December 31, 1951	3–5	Montreal Canadiens (1951–52)	21–6–8

January

Game	Result	Date	Score	Opponent	Record
36	L	January 2, 1952	0–1	@ New York Rangers (1951–52)	21–7–8
37	W	January 6, 1952	4–2	Boston Bruins (1951–52)	22–7–8
38	W	January 10, 1952	5–2	New York Rangers (1951–52)	23–7–8
39	L	January 12, 1952	3–5	@ Toronto Maple Leafs (1951–52)	23–8–8
40	W	January 13, 1952	2–1	Toronto Maple Leafs (1951–52)	24–8–8
41	W	January 17, 1952	5–0	Boston Bruins (1951–52)	25–8–8
42	W	January 19, 1952	4–0	@ Montreal Canadiens (1951–52)	26–8–8
43	L	January 20, 1952	2–3	New York Rangers (1951–52)	26–9–8
44	T	January 24, 1952	2–2	Toronto Maple Leafs (1951–52)	26–9–9
45	L	January 26, 1952	2–3	Chicago Black Hawks (1951–52)	26–10–9
46	W	January 27, 1952	2–0	@ Chicago Black Hawks (1951–52)	27–10–9
47	L	January 29, 1952	1–3	@ Boston Bruins (1951–52)	27–11–9

February

Game	Result	Date	Score	Opponent	Record
48	T	February 2, 1952	2–2	@ Montreal Canadiens (1951–52)	27–11–10
49	W	February 3, 1952	4–3	New York Rangers (1951–52)	28–11–10
50	W	February 7, 1952	5–3	Montreal Canadiens (1951–52)	29–11–10
51	W	February 10, 1952	2–0	@ Boston Bruins (1951–52)	30–11–10
52	W	February 13, 1952	3–1	@ Toronto Maple Leafs (1951–52)	31–11–10
53	W	February 14, 1952	3–2	@ Chicago Black Hawks (1951–52)	32–11–10
54	W	February 18, 1952	4–2	Boston Bruins (1951–52)	33–11–10
55	T	February 20, 1952	1–1	@ New York Rangers (1951–52)	33–11–11
56	W	February 23, 1952	3–1	@ Toronto Maple Leafs (1951–52)	34–11–11
57	W	February 24, 1952	2–1	@ Chicago Black Hawks (1951–52)	35–11–11
58	W	February 26, 1952	4–3	@ Boston Bruins (1951–52)	36–11–11
59	L	February 28, 1952	2–3	@ Montreal Canadiens (1951–52)	36–12–11

March

Game	Result	Date	Score	Opponent	Record
60	W	March 2, 1952	6–4	@ New York Rangers (1951–52)	37–12–11
61	W	March 3, 1952	3–2	Chicago Black Hawks (1951–52)	38–12–11
62	W	March 6, 1952	2–1	Boston Bruins (1951–52)	39–12–11
63	L	March 8, 1952	3–6	@ Toronto Maple Leafs (1951–52)	39–13–11
64	W	March 9, 1952	6–1	Toronto Maple Leafs (1951–52)	40–13–11
65	L	March 11, 1952	2–3	@ Boston Bruins (1951–52)	40–14–11
66	W	March 15, 1952	6–1	Chicago Black Hawks (1951–52)	41–14–11
67	W	March 16, 1952	4–0	@ Chicago Black Hawks (1951–52)	42–14–11
68	W	March 20, 1952	7–3	New York Rangers (1951–52)	43–14–11
69	T	March 22, 1952	3–3	@ Montreal Canadiens (1951–52)	43–14–12
70	W	March 23, 1952	7–2	Montreal Canadiens (1951–52)	44–14–12

Legend: Win (2 points) Loss (0 points) Tie (1 point)

== Playoffs ==
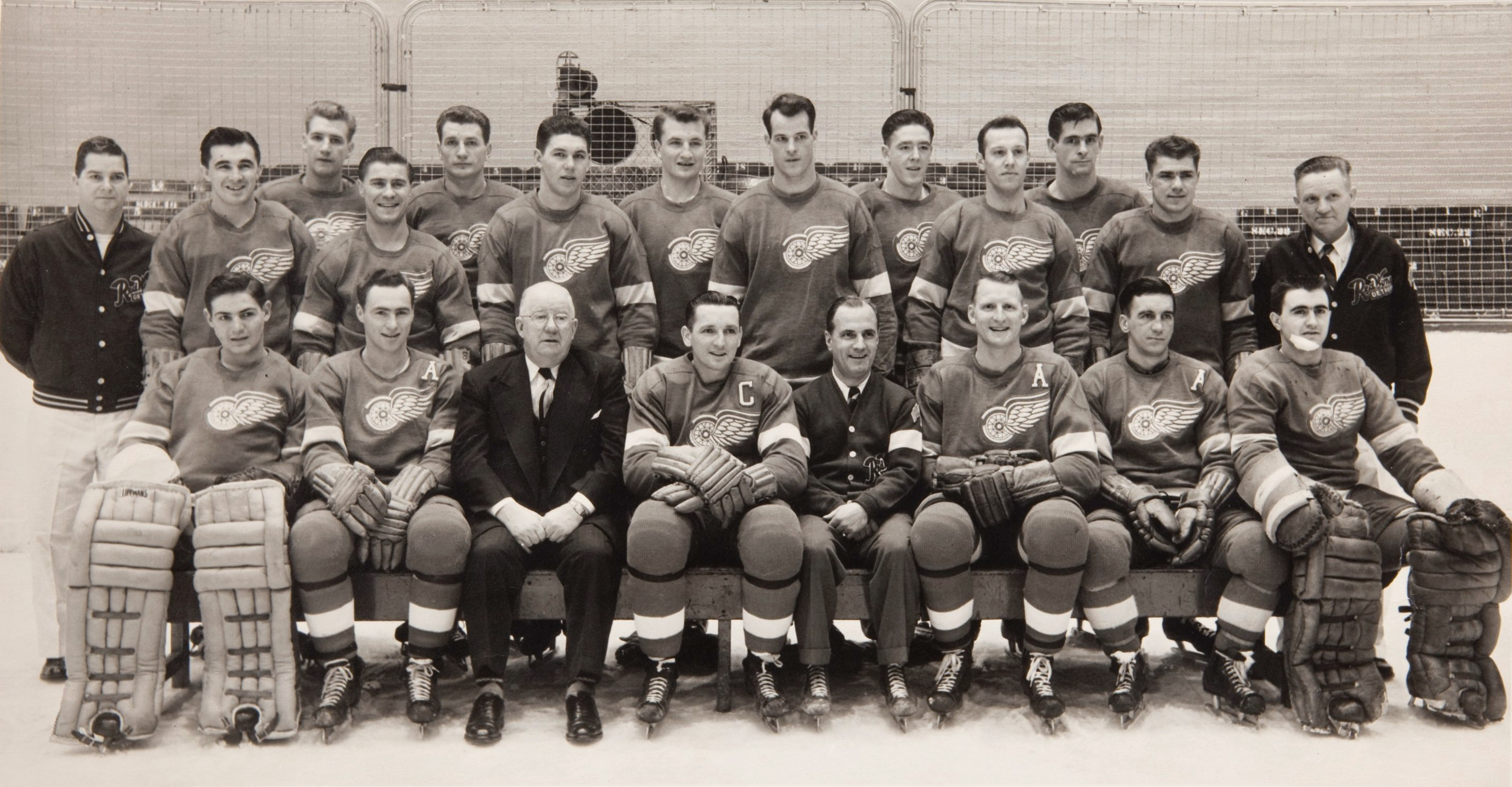
Team photo with Sid Abel in the front row wearing the captain's "C"

=== Stanley Cup Finals ===
Date	Away	Score	Home	Score
April 10	Detroit	3	Montreal	1
April 12	Detroit	2	Montreal	1
April 13	Montreal	0	Detroit	3
April 15	Montreal	0	Detroit	3

Detroit wins best-of-seven series 4 games to none

=== Roster ===
Terry Sawchuk, Bob Goldham, Benny Woit, Red Kelly, Leo Reise, Marcel Pronovost, Ted Lindsay, Tony Leswick, Gordie Howe, Metro Prystai, Marty Pavelich, Sid Abel (captain), Glen Skov, Alex Delvecchio, John Wilson, Vic Stasiuk, Larry Zeidel, Jack Adams (manager), Tommy Ivan (coach), Carl Mattson (trainer)

The team photo includes two goaltenders: Sawchuk (at far left of the front row) and Bill Tibbs (at far right of the front row); Tibbs never actually played in any NHL game.

This was the last season that the team's "Production Line" of Abel, Howe, and Lindsay played together, as Abel was subsequently traded to the Chicago Black Hawks, with whom he finished his NHL career.

== Player statistics ==
=== Regular season ===
Scoring

Player	Pos	GP	G	A	Pts	PIM
Gordie Howe	RW	70	47	39	86	78
Ted Lindsay	LW	70	30	39	69	123
Sid Abel	C/LW	62	17	36	53	32
Red Kelly	D/C	67	16	31	47	16
Metro Prystai	C	69	21	22	43	16
Alex Delvecchio	C/LW	65	15	22	37	22
Marty Pavelich	LW	68	17	19	36	54
Glen Skov	C/LW	70	12	14	26	48
Tony Leswick	W	70	9	10	19	93
Fred Glover	C	54	9	9	18	25
Marcel Pronovost	D	69	7	11	18	50
Vic Stasiuk	LW	58	5	9	14	19
Bob Goldham	D	69	0	14	14	24
Benny Woit	RW/D	58	3	8	11	20
Leo Reise	D	54	0	11	11	34
Johnny Wilson	LW	28	4	5	9	18
Enio Sclisizzi	LW	9	2	1	3	0
Larry Zeidel	D	19	1	0	1	14
Bill Folk	D	4	0	0	0	2
Terry Sawchuk	G	70	0	0	0	2
Larry Wilson	C	5	0	0	0	4

Goaltending

Player	MIN	GP	W	L	T	GA	GAA	SO
Terry Sawchuk	4200	70	44	14	12	133	1.90	12
Team:	4200	70	44	14	12	133	1.90	12

=== Playoffs ===
Scoring

Player	Pos	GP	G	A	Pts	PIM
Ted Lindsay	LW	8	5	2	7	8
Gordie Howe	RW	8	2	5	7	2
Metro Prystai	C	8	2	5	7	0
Johnny Wilson	LW	8	4	1	5	5
Glen Skov	C/LW	8	1	4	5	16
Tony Leswick	W	8	3	1	4	22
Sid Abel	C/LW	7	2	2	4	12
Marty Pavelich	LW	8	2	2	4	2
Alex Delvecchio	C/LW	8	0	3	3	4
Benny Woit	RW/D	8	1	1	2	2
Vic Stasiuk	LW	7	0	2	2	0
Red Kelly	D/C	5	1	0	1	0
Leo Reise	D	6	1	0	1	27
Bob Goldham	D	8	0	1	1	8
Marcel Pronovost	D	8	0	1	1	10
Terry Sawchuk	G	8	0	0	0	0
Larry Zeidel	D	5	0	0	0	0

Goaltending

Player	MIN	GP	W	L	GA	GAA	SO
Terry Sawchuk	480	8	8	0	5	0.62	4
Team:	480	8	8	0	5	0.62	4

Note: GP = Games played; G = Goals; A = Assists; Pts = Points; +/- = Plus-minus PIM = Penalty minutes; PPG = Power-play goals; SHG = Short-handed goals; GWG = Game-winning goals;
MIN = Minutes played; W = Wins; L = Losses; T = Ties; GA = Goals against; GAA = Goals-against average; SO = Shutouts;

== Awards and records ==
- Prince of Wales Trophy (regular-season best record): team
- Art Ross Trophy (league top scorer): Gordie Howe
- Hart Memorial Trophy (league MVP): Gordie Howe
- Vezina Trophy (league best goaltender): Terry Sawchuk
- First-team all-star selections: Terry Sawchuk (G), Red Kelly (D), Gordie Howe (RW), Ted Lindsay (LW)
