= Commoner =

Historically, an ordinary person who lacked significant social status

A commoner, also known as the common man, commoners, the common people or the masses, was in earlier use an ordinary person in a community or nation who did not have any significant social status, especially a member of neither royalty, nobility, nor any other part of the aristocracy. Depending on culture and period, other elevated persons (such as members of clergy) may have had higher social status in their own right, or were regarded as commoners if lacking an aristocratic background.

This class overlaps with the legal class of people who have a property interest in common land, a longstanding feature of land law in England and Wales. Commoners who have rights for a particular common are typically neighbors, not the public in general.

In monarchic marriage terminology, aristocracy and nobility may be included in the term.

== History ==
Various sovereign states throughout history have governed, or claimed to govern, in the name of the common people. In Europe, a distinct concept analogous to common people arose in the Classical civilization of ancient Rome around the 6th century BC, with the social division into patricians (nobles) and plebeians (commoners). The division may have been instituted by Servius Tullius, as an alternative to the previous clan-based divisions that had been responsible for internecine conflict. The ancient Greeks generally had no concept of class and their leading social divisions were simply non-Greeks, free-Greeks and slaves. The early organization of Ancient Athens was something of an exception with certain official roles like archons, magistrates and treasurers being reserved for only the wealthiest citizens – these class-like divisions were weakened by the democratic reforms of Cleisthenes who created new horizontal social divisions in contrasting fashion to the vertical ones thought to have been created by Tullius.

Both the Roman Republic and the Roman Empire used the Latin term Senatus Populusque Romanus (the Senate and People of Rome). This term was fixed to Roman legionary standards, and even after the Roman Emperors achieved a state of total personal autocracy, they continued to wield their power in the name of the Senate and People of Rome.

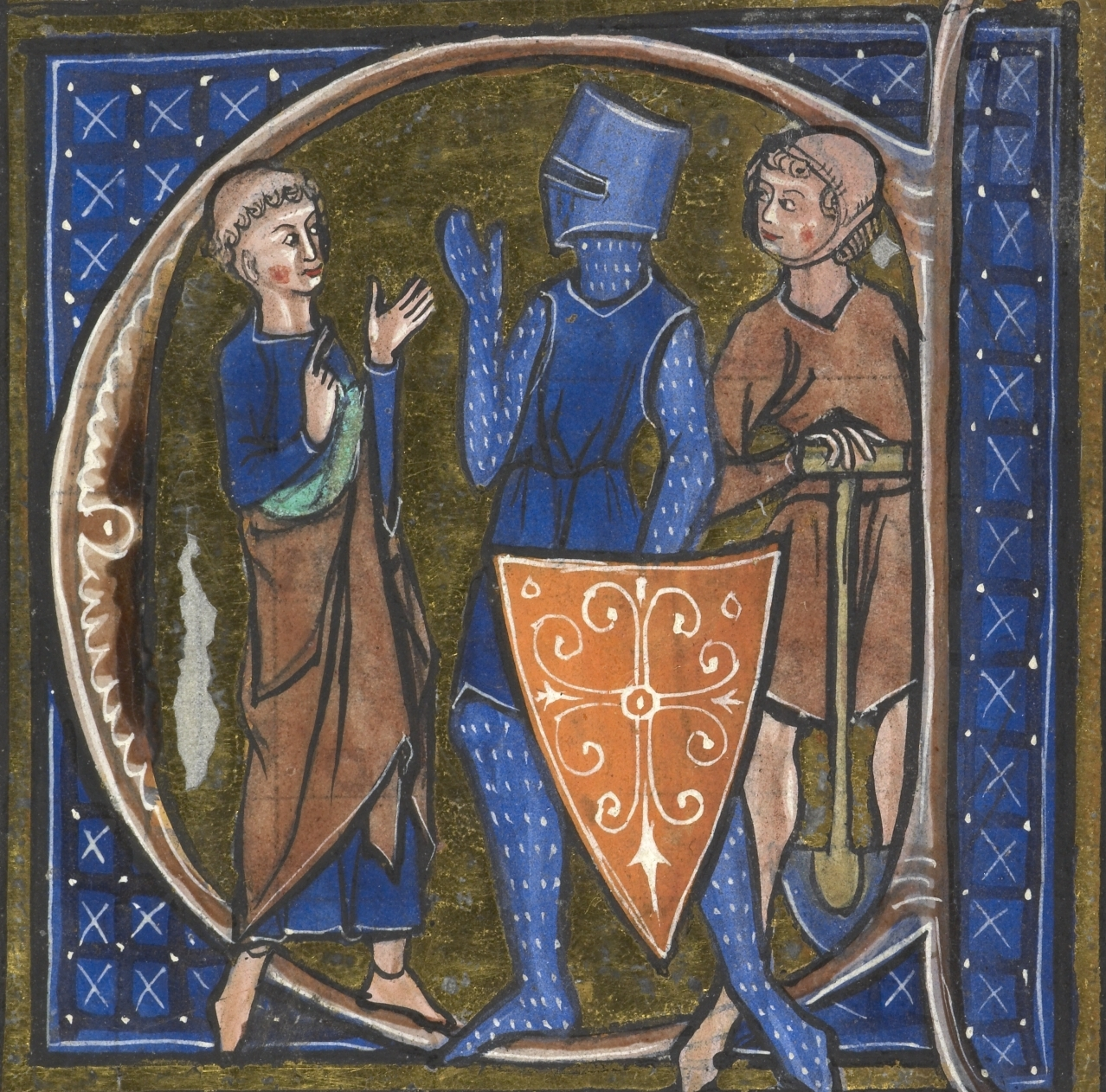
A Medieval French manuscript illustration depicting the three estates: clergy (oratores), nobles (bellatores), and commoners (laboratores).

With the growth of Christianity in the 4th century AD, a new world view arose that underpinned European thinking on social division until at least early modern times. Saint Augustine postulated that social division was a result of the Fall of Man. The three leading divisions were considered to be the priesthood (clergy), the nobility, and the common people. Sometimes this was expressed as "those who prayed", "those who fought" and "those who worked". The Latin terms for the three classes – oratores, bellatores and laboratores – are often found even in modern textbooks, and have been used in sources since the 9th century. This threefold division was formalized in the estate system of social stratification, where again commoners were the bulk of the population who are neither members of the nobility nor of the clergy. They were the third of the Three Estates of the Realm in medieval Europe, consisting of peasants and artisans.

Social mobility for commoners was limited throughout the Middle Ages. Generally, the serfs were unable to enter the group of the bellatores. Commoners could sometimes secure entry for their children into the oratores class; usually they would serve as rural parish priests. In some cases they received education from the clergy and ascended to senior administrative positions; in some cases nobles welcomed such advancement as former commoners were more likely to be neutral in dynastic feuds. There were cases of serfs becoming clerics in the Holy Roman Empire, though from the Carolingian era, clergy were generally recruited from the nobility. Of the two thousand bishops serving from the 8th to the 15th century, just five came from the peasantry.

The social and political order of medieval Europe was relatively stable until the development of the mobile cannon in the 15th century. Up until that time a noble with a small force could hold their castle or walled town for years even against large armies - and so they were rarely disposed. Once effective cannons were available, walls were of far less defensive value and rulers needed expensive field armies to keep control of a territory. This encouraged the formation of princely and kingly states, which needed to tax the common people much more heavily to pay for the expensive weapons and armies required to provide security in the new age. Up until the late 15th century, surviving medieval treaties on government were concerned with advising rulers on how to serve the common good: Assize of Bread is an example of medieval law specifically drawn up in the interests of the common people. But then works by Philippe de Commines, Niccolò Machiavelli, and later Cardinal Richelieu began advising rulers to consider their own interests and that of the state ahead of what was "good", with Richelieu explicitly saying the state is above morality in doctrines such as Raison d'Etat. This change of orientation among the nobles left the common people less content with their place in society. A similar trend occurred regarding the clergy, where many priests began to abuse the great power they had due to the sacrament of contrition. The Reformation was a movement that aimed to correct this, but even afterwards the common people's trust in the clergy continued to decline – priests were often seen as greedy and lacking in true faith. An early major social upheaval driven in part by the common people's mistrust of both the nobility and clergy occurred in Great Britain with the English Revolution of 1642. After the forces of Oliver Cromwell triumphed, movements like the Levellers rose to prominence demanding equality for all. When the general council of Cromwell's army met to decide on a new order at the Putney Debates of 1647, one of the commanders, Colonel Thomas Rainsborough, requested that political power be given to the common people. According to historian Roger Osbourne, the Colonel's speech was the first time a prominent person spoke in favor of universal male suffrage, but it was not to be granted until 1918. After much debate it was decided that only those with considerable property would be allowed to vote, and so after the revolution political power in England remained largely controlled by the nobles, with at first only a few of the most wealthy or well-connected common people sitting in Parliament.

The rise of the bourgeoisie during the Late Middle Ages, had seen an intermediate class of wealthy commoners develop, which ultimately gave rise to the modern middle classes. Middle-class people and upper bourgeoisie could still be called commoners until after World War I. For example, Pitt the Elder was often called The Great Commoner in England, and this appellation was later used for the 20th-century American anti-elitist campaigner William Jennings Bryan. The interests of the middle class were not always aligned with their fellow commoners of the working class.

According to social historian Karl Polanyi, Britain's middle class in 19th-century Britain turned against their fellow commoners by seizing political power from the British upper class via the Reform Act 1832. The emergence of the Industrial Revolution had caused severe economic distress to a large number of working class commoners, leaving many of them with no means to earn a living as the traditional system of tenant farming was replaced with large-scale agriculture run by a small number of individuals. The upper class had responded to their plight by establishing institutions such as workhouses, where unemployed lower-class Britons could find a source of employment, and outdoor relief, where monetary and other forms of assistance were given to both the unemployed and those on low income without them needing to enter a workhouse to receive it.

Though initial middle class opposition to the Poor Law reform of William Pitt the Younger had prevented the emergence of a coherent and generous nationwide provision, the resulting Speenhamland system did generally manage to prevent working class commoners from starvation. In 1834, outdoor relief was abolished and workhouses were deliberately made into places so unappealing that many often preferred to starve rather than enter them. For Polanyi this related to the economic doctrine prevalent at the time which held that only the spur of hunger could make workers flexible enough for the proper functioning of the free market. By the end of the 19th century, at least in mainland Britain, economic progress has been sufficient that even the working class were generally able to earn a good living, and as such working and middle class interests began to converge, lessening the division within the ranks of common people. Polanyi notes that in Continental Europe, middle and working class interests did not diverge anywhere near as markedly as they had in Britain.

== Trifold division breakdown ==
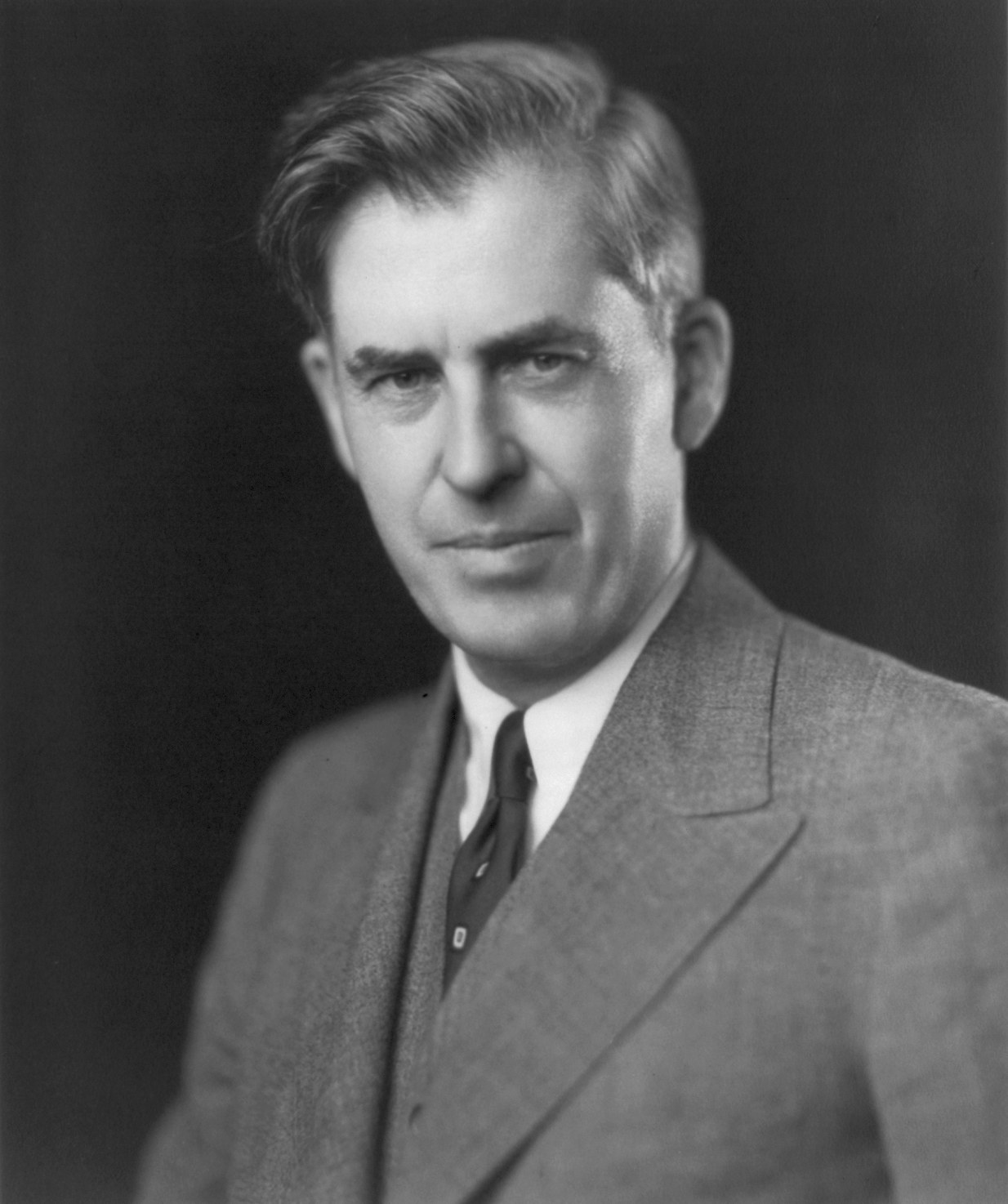
US vice president Henry A. Wallace proclaimed the "arrival of the century of the common man" in a 1942 speech broadcast nationwide in the United States.

After the French Revolution and the Napoleonic Wars along with industrialization, the division in three estates – nobility, clergy and commoners – had become somewhat outdated. The term "common people" continued to be used, but now in a more general sense to refer to regular people as opposed to the privileged elite.

Communist theory divided society into capitalists on one hand, and the proletariat or the masses on the other. In Marxism, the people are considered to be the creator of history. By using the word "people", Marx did not gloss over the class differences, but united certain elements, capable of completing the revolution. The Intelligentsia's sympathy for the common people gained strength in the 19th century in many countries. For example, in Imperial Russia a big part of the intelligentsia was striving for its emancipation. Several great writers (Nekrasov, Herzen, Tolstoy etc.) wrote about sufferings of the common people. Organizations, parties and movements arose, proclaiming the liberation of the people. These included among others: "People's Reprisal", "People’s Will", "Party of Popular Freedom" and the "People's Socialist Party".

In the United States, a famous 1942 speech by vice president Henry A. Wallace proclaimed the arrival of the "century of the common man" saying that all over the world the "common people" were on the march, specifically referring to Chinese, Indians, Russians, and as well as Americans. Wallace's speech would later inspire the widely reproduced popular work Fanfare for the Common Man by Aaron Copland. In 1948, US president Harry S. Truman made a speech saying there needs to be a government "that will work in the interests of the common people and not in the interests of the men who have all the money."

== Social divisions in non-Western civilizations ==
Comparative historian Oswald Spengler found the social separation into nobility, priests and commoners to occur again and again in the various civilizations that he surveyed (although the division may not exist for pre-civilized society). As an example, in the Babylonian civilization, the Code of Hammurabi made provision for punishments to be harsher for harming a noble than a commoner.

== See also ==
- Aam Aadmi – Hindustani colloquial expression
- Battler (underdog) – Australian term for working-class hard worker
- British subject – Legal term that has evolved over time
- Demagogue – Politician or orator who panders to fears and emotions of the public
- Deme – Administrative unit in ancient Athens
- Dominant ideology – Concept in Marxist philosophy
- Folk
- Hoi polloi – Expression from Greek that means "the many"
- Normality (behavior) – Most common behavior for a person or social group
- NPC (meme) – Insult implying a lack of critical thinking
- Ochlocracy – Democracy spoiled by demagoguery and the rule of passion over reason
- List of peasant revolts
- Plain folks – Logical fallacy
- Populism – Political ideology emphasising the "common people"
- Republicanism – Political ideology centered on citizenship in a state organized as a republic
- The Common Man – Comic character created by R. K. Laxman
- Tyranny of the majority – Inherent oppressive potential of simple majority rule
- Qara bodun – Term given to common people of early Turks
- Rayah – Name given to common people by Ottomans
