= 1951–52 Boston Bruins season =

NHL team season

1951–52 Boston Bruins
- League: 4th NHL
- 1951–52 record: 25–29–16
- Home record: 15–12–8
- Road record: 10–17–8
- Goals for: 162
- Goals against: 176

Team information
- General manager: Art Ross
- Coach: Lynn Patrick
- Captain: Milt Schmidt
- Arena: Boston Garden; Boston Arena
- Average attendance: 7,004

Team leaders
- Goals: Milt Schmidt (21)
- Assists: Johnny Peirson (30)
- Points: Milt Schmidt (50); Johnny Peirson (50)
- Penalty minutes: Gus Kyle (127)
- Wins: Jim Henry (25)
- Goals against average: Jim Henry (2.51)

The 1951–52 Boston Bruins season was the Bruins' 28th season in the NHL.

== Offseason ==
Despite a successful two seasons in goal, including winning the Calder Memorial Trophy as rookie of the year in the 1950 season, Bruins goaltender Jack Gelineau asked general manager Art Ross for a raise. Upon being rejected, he left the team for a business position in Montreal. The Bruins acquired former Rangers and Black Hawks goaltender Jim Henry to replace him. In another offseason deal, the Bruins traded Paul Ronty to the Rangers for former Bruin farmland and 1949 Calder Trophy winner Pentti Lund and Gus Kyle.

== Regular season ==
On October 12—the day after the season started—team owner Weston Adams sold a controlling interest in the Bruins to the Boston Garden-Arena Corporation, led by Walter A. Brown, the general manager of Boston Garden and owner of the Boston Celtics.

Due to a collapse of the brine pipes at Boston Garden, the February 26th game against the Detroit Red Wings had to be transferred to Boston Arena, the Bruins' original home. The 4–3 loss would prove to be the final regular season game the Bruins played at the Arena.

On March 18 against the Chicago Black Hawks, team captain Milt Schmidt not only scored his 200th goal, but was honored in a game that saw former Kraut Line teammate Bobby Bauer come out of a five-year retirement to join Schmidt and Woody Dumart in the match. Bauer scored a goal and assist in the Bruins' 4–0 win, his final NHL game.

=== Final standings ===
National Hockey League
		GP	W	L	T	GF	GA	DIFF	Pts
1	Detroit Red Wings	70	44	14	12	215	133	+82	100
2	Montreal Canadiens	70	34	26	10	195	164	+31	78
3	Toronto Maple Leafs	70	29	25	16	168	157	+11	74
4	Boston Bruins	70	25	29	16	162	176	−14	66
5	New York Rangers	70	23	34	13	192	219	−27	59
6	Chicago Black Hawks	70	17	44	9	158	241	−83	43

=== Record vs. opponents ===
1951–52 NHL Records
Team	BOS	CHI	DET	MTL	NYR	TOR
Boston	—	9–3–2	3–8–3	7–5–2	4–6–4	2–7–5
Chicago	3–9–2	—	2–12	1–10–3	5–7–2	6–6–2
Detroit	8–3–3	12–2	—	9–2–3	9–3–2	6–4–4
Montreal	5–7–2	10–1–3	2–9–3	—	9–4–1	8–5–1
New York	6–4–4	7–5–2	3–9–2	4–9–1	—	3–7–4
Toronto	7–2–5	6–6–2	4–6–4	5–8–1	7–3–4	—

== Schedule and results ==
1951–52 regular season
October

Game	Result	Date	Score	Opponent	Record
1	L	October 11, 1951	0–1	@ Detroit Red Wings (1951–52)	0–1–0
3	L	October 14, 1951	3–4	Montreal Canadiens (1951–52)	1–2–0
4	L	October 17, 1951	2–4	@ Toronto Maple Leafs (1951–52)	1–3–0
5	T	October 21, 1951	1–1	New York Rangers (1951–52)	1–3–1
6	W	October 24, 1951	3–1	@ New York Rangers (1951–52)	2–3–1
7	W	October 28, 1951	2–0	@ Chicago Black Hawks (1951–52)	3–3–1

November

Game	Result	Date	Score	Opponent	Record
8	W	November 1, 1951	3–2	@ Detroit Red Wings (1951–52)	4–3–1
9	W	November 4, 1951	4–2	@ Chicago Black Hawks (1951–52)	5–3–1
10	T	November 6, 1951	0–0	Detroit Red Wings (1951–52)	5–3–2
11	L	November 8, 1951	2–4	@ Montreal Canadiens (1951–52)	5–4–2
12	T	November 11, 1951	1–1	Toronto Maple Leafs (1951–52)	5–4–3
13	L	November 13, 1951	1–3	Chicago Black Hawks (1951–52)	5–5–3
14	T	November 17, 1951	1–1	@ Toronto Maple Leafs (1951–52)	5–5–4
15	T	November 18, 1951	3–3	Montreal Canadiens (1951–52)	5–5–5
16	L	November 20, 1951	0–2	Detroit Red Wings (1951–52)	5–6–5
17	T	November 21, 1951	3–3	@ New York Rangers (1951–52)	5–6–6
18	L	November 25, 1951	1–4	Toronto Maple Leafs (1951–52)	5–7–6
19	T	November 27, 1951	1–1	New York Rangers (1951–52)	5–7–7
20	T	November 29, 1951	1–1	@ Detroit Red Wings (1951–52)	5–7–8

December

Game	Result	Date	Score	Opponent	Record
21	W	December 2, 1951	4–1	Montreal Canadiens (1951–52)	6–7–8
22	W	December 4, 1951	3–1	Chicago Black Hawks (1951–52)	7–7–8
23	W	December 5, 1951	3–2	@ New York Rangers (1951–52)	8–7–8
24	L	December 9, 1951	3–4	@ Chicago Black Hawks (1951–52)	8–8–8
25	W	December 11, 1951	4–2	New York Rangers (1951–52)	9–8–8
26	L	December 12, 1951	3–6	@ New York Rangers (1951–52)	9–9–8
27	L	December 15, 1951	1–3	@ Montreal Canadiens (1951–52)	9–10–8
28	L	December 16, 1951	2–4	Montreal Canadiens (1951–52)	9–11–8
29	T	December 18, 1951	5–5	Detroit Red Wings (1951–52)	9–11–9
30	L	December 22, 1951	2–3	@ Toronto Maple Leafs (1951–52)	9–12–9
31	W	December 23, 1951	4–2	Toronto Maple Leafs (1951–52)	10–12–9
32	L	December 25, 1951	2–6	Chicago Black Hawks (1951–52)	10–13–9
33	L	December 29, 1951	0–4	@ Toronto Maple Leafs (1951–52)	10–14–9

January

Game	Result	Date	Score	Opponent	Record
34	L	January 1, 1952	2–4	New York Rangers (1951–52)	10–15–9
35	W	January 5, 1952	3–2	@ Montreal Canadiens (1951–52)	11–15–9
36	L	January 6, 1952	2–4	@ Detroit Red Wings (1951–52)	11–16–9
37	W	January 8, 1952	7–2	@ Chicago Black Hawks (1951–52)	12–16–9
38	W	January 13, 1952	5–4	Chicago Black Hawks (1951–52)	13–16–9
39	L	January 15, 1952	0–1	Toronto Maple Leafs (1951–52)	13–17–9
40	L	January 17, 1952	0–5	@ Detroit Red Wings (1951–52)	13–18–9
41	L	January 19, 1952	2–6	@ Toronto Maple Leafs (1951–52)	13–19–9
42	W	January 20, 1952	2–1	Montreal Canadiens (1951–52)	14–19–9
43	T	January 22, 1952	3–3	New York Rangers (1951–52)	14–19–10
44	L	January 26, 1952	3–5	@ Montreal Canadiens (1951–52)	14–20–10
45	L	January 27, 1952	0–3	Toronto Maple Leafs (1951–52)	14–21–10
46	W	January 29, 1952	3–1	Detroit Red Wings (1951–52)	15–21–10
47	T	January 31, 1952	0–0	@ Chicago Black Hawks (1951–52)	15–21–11

February

Game	Result	Date	Score	Opponent	Record
48	T	February 2, 1952	1–1	@ Toronto Maple Leafs (1951–52)	15–21–12
49	W	February 3, 1952	1–0	Montreal Canadiens (1951–52)	16–21–12
50	W	February 5, 1952	5–0	Chicago Black Hawks (1951–52)	17–21–12
51	L	February 9, 1952	2–4	New York Rangers (1951–52)	17–22–12
52	L	February 10, 1952	0–2	Detroit Red Wings (1951–52)	17–23–12
53	L	February 13, 1952	2–6	@ New York Rangers (1951–52)	17–24–12
54	W	February 17, 1952	5–2	@ Chicago Black Hawks (1951–52)	18–24–12
55	L	February 18, 1952	2–4	@ Detroit Red Wings (1951–52)	18–25–12
56	T	February 21, 1952	3–3	@ Montreal Canadiens (1951–52)	18–25–13
57	L	February 24, 1952	2–5	@ New York Rangers (1951–52)	18–26–13
58	L	February 26, 1952	3–4	Detroit Red Wings (1951–52)	18–27–13

March

Game	Result	Date	Score	Opponent	Record
59	T	March 1, 1952	1–1	@ Toronto Maple Leafs (1951–52)	18–27–14
60	T	March 2, 1952	2–2	Toronto Maple Leafs (1951–52)	18–27–15
61	W	March 4, 1952	4–1	New York Rangers (1951–52)	19–27–15
62	L	March 6, 1952	1–2	@ Detroit Red Wings (1951–52)	19–28–15
63	W	March 9, 1952	4–2	Chicago Black Hawks (1951–52)	20–28–15
64	W	March 11, 1952	3–2	Detroit Red Wings (1951–52)	21–28–15
65	T	March 13, 1952	3–3	@ Chicago Black Hawks (1951–52)	21–28–16
66	W	March 15, 1952	2–0	@ Montreal Canadiens (1951–52)	22–28–16
67	W	March 16, 1952	2–1	Montreal Canadiens (1951–52)	23–28–16
68	W	March 18, 1952	4–0	Chicago Black Hawks (1951–52)	24–28–16
69	L	March 19, 1952	4–6	@ New York Rangers (1951–52)	24–29–16
70	W	March 23, 1952	4–2	Toronto Maple Leafs (1951–52)	25–29–16

Legend: Win (2 points) Loss (0 points) Tie (1 point)

== Player statistics ==
=== Regular season ===
Scoring

Player	Pos	GP	G	A	Pts	PIM
Milt Schmidt	C/D	69	21	29	50	57
Johnny Peirson	RW	68	20	30	50	30
Dave Creighton	C	49	20	17	37	18
Jack McIntyre	D	52	12	19	31	18
Dunc Fisher	RW	65	15	12	27	2
Ed Sandford	LW	65	13	12	25	54
Real Chevrefils	LW	33	8	17	25	8
Red Sullivan	C	67	12	12	24	24
Bill Quackenbush	D	69	2	17	19	6
Adam Brown	LW	33	8	9	17	6
Woody Dumart	LW	39	5	8	13	0
Gus Kyle	D	69	1	12	13	127
Hal Laycoe	D	70	5	7	12	61
Bill Ezinicki	RW	28	5	5	10	47
Fleming MacKell	C	30	1	8	9	24
Ed Kryzanowski	D	70	5	3	8	33
Lorne Ferguson	LW	27	3	4	7	14
Leo Labine	RW	15	2	4	6	9
Murray Henderson	D	56	0	6	6	51
Pentti Lund	RW	23	0	5	5	0
Vic Lynn	LW/D	12	2	2	4	4
Ray Barry	C	18	1	2	3	6
Bobby Bauer	RW	1	1	1	2	0
Jim Morrison	D	14	0	2	2	2
Jim Henry	G	70	0	0	0	0

Goaltending

Player	MIN	GP	W	L	T	GA	GAA	SO
Jim Henry	4200	70	25	29	16	176	2.51	7
Team:	4200	70	25	29	16	176	2.51	7

=== Playoffs ===
Scoring

Player	Pos	GP	G	A	Pts	PIM
Ed Sandford	LW	7	2	2	4	0
Dave Creighton	C	7	2	1	3	2
Fleming MacKell	C	5	2	1	3	12
Milt Schmidt	C/D	7	2	1	3	0
Jack McIntyre	D	7	1	2	3	2
Bill Quackenbush	D	7	0	3	3	0
Real Chevrefils	LW	7	1	1	2	6
Hal Laycoe	D	7	1	1	2	11
Johnny Peirson	RW	7	0	2	2	4
Pentti Lund	RW	2	1	0	1	0
Woody Dumart	LW	7	0	1	1	0
Leo Labine	RW	5	0	1	1	4
Bob Armstrong	D	5	0	0	0	2
Dunc Fisher	RW	2	0	0	0	0
Murray Henderson	D	7	0	0	0	4
Jim Henry	G	7	0	0	0	0
Ed Kryzanowski	D	7	0	0	0	0
Gus Kyle	D	2	0	0	0	4
Red Sullivan	C	7	0	0	0	0

Goaltending

Player	MIN	GP	W	L	GA	GAA	SO
Jim Henry	448	7	3	4	18	2.41	1
Team:	448	7	3	4	18	2.41	1

Note:

Pos = Position;GP = Games played; G = Goals; A = Assists; Pts = Points; PIM = Penalty minutes; +/- = Plus/minus; PPG = Power-play goals; SHG = Short-handed goals; GWG = Game-winning goals
Pos = Position;GP = Games played; Min, TOI = Minutes played; W = Wins; L = Losses; T,T/OT = Ties; OTL = Overtime losses; GA = Goals-against; GAA = Goals-against average; SO = Shutouts; SA = Shots against; SV = Shots saved;SV% = Save percentage;

== See also ==
- 1951–52 NHL season
