= Qara bodun =

Term given to common people of early Turks

Qara bodun (lit. 'black commoners', Old Turkic: 𐰴𐰺𐰀:𐰉𐰆𐰑𐰣) was a name given to the common people of Turkic khaganates. The term bodun means "people", used after the name of the tribal confederation, but it appears also in the expression of begler bodun meaning "the nobles and the common people". The term qara ("black") was used to designate a lower or subject social class. In the 8th century, Göktürk and Uyghur inscriptions, the common folk, those who were not the begler were designated as qara bodun.

== See also ==
- Rayah
