= Cliff Malone =

Canadian ice hockey player

- Born: September 4, 1925 Quebec City, Quebec, Canada
- Died: October 8, 2008 (aged 83) Toronto, Ontario, Canada
- Height: 5 ft 10 in (178 cm)
- Weight: 155 lb (70 kg; 11 st 1 lb)
- Position: Right Wing
- Shot: Right
- Played for: Montreal Canadiens
- Playing career: 1944–1954

Clifford Swindell Malone Jr (September 4, 1925 — October 8, 2008) was a Canadian professional ice hockey forward who played 3 games in the National Hockey League (NHL) for the Montreal Canadiens during the 1951–52 season, recording no points. The rest of his career, which lasted from 1944 to 1954, was mainly spent in the Quebec Senior Hockey League.

Cliff Malone is the son of Cliff Malone Senior, the brother of Hockey Hall of Famer Joe Malone. Cliff Malone Sr played defence for the Sons of Ireland senior team in Quebec City. Cliff Malone Jr died on October 8, 2008, in Toronto.

== Career statistics ==
=== Regular season and playoffs ===
| | | | Regular season | | | | | Playoffs |
| Season | Team | League | GP | G | A | Pts | PIM | GP | G | A | Pts | PIM |
|---|---|---|---|---|---|---|---|---|---|---|---|---|
| 1943–44 | Montreal Junior Royals | QJAHA | 9 | 8 | 8 | 16 | 2 | — | — | — | — | — |
| 1943–44 | Toronto Fuels | TMHL | 3 | 3 | 5 | 8 | 0 | — | — | — | — | — |
| 1944–45 | Montreal Junior Royals | QJAHA | 13 | 14 | 9 | 23 | 2 | 7 | 7 | 3 | 10 | 4 |
| 1944–45 | Montreal RCAF | MCHL | 14 | 11 | 6 | 17 | 6 | 1 | 3 | 0 | 3 | 0 |
| 1944–45 | Montreal Royals | QSHL | 2 | 0 | 0 | 0 | 0 | 1 | 0 | 0 | 0 | 0 |
| 1944–45 | Montreal Junior Royals | M-Cup | — | — | — | — | — | 8 | 5 | 6 | 11 | 0 |
| 1945–46 | Montreal Royals | QSHL | — | — | — | — | — | 2 | 1 | 0 | 1 | 0 |
| 1946–47 | Montreal Royals | QSHL | 31 | 16 | 19 | 35 | 6 | 11 | 4 | 4 | 8 | 12 |
| 1946–47 | Montreal Royals | Al-Cup | — | — | — | — | — | 14 | 8 | 13 | 21 | 4 |
| 1947–48 | Montreal Royals | QSHL | 46 | 18 | 49 | 67 | 21 | 3 | 1 | 0 | 1 | 2 |
| 1948–49 | Montreal Royals | QSHL | 64 | 35 | 60 | 95 | 40 | 9 | 3 | 4 | 7 | 10 |
| 1949–50 | Montreal Royals | QSHL | 60 | 21 | 36 | 57 | 55 | 6 | 2 | 1 | 3 | 4 |
| 1950–51 | Montreal Royals | QSHL | 60 | 25 | 24 | 49 | 54 | 7 | 0 | 4 | 4 | 2 |
| 1951–52 | Montreal Canadiens | NHL | 3 | 0 | 0 | 0 | 0 | — | — | — | — | — |
| 1951–52 | Montreal Royals | QSHL | 56 | 29 | 37 | 66 | 10 | 7 | 3 | 4 | 7 | 0 |
| 1952–53 | Montreal Royals | QSHL | 60 | 15 | 34 | 49 | 42 | 15 | 3 | 6 | 9 | 2 |
| 1953–54 | Montreal Royals | QSHL | 13 | 0 | 3 | 3 | 8 | — | — | — | — | — |
| 1953–54 | Saint Therese Titans | QPHL | — | — | — | — | — | — | — | — | — | — |
| QSHL totals | | | 379 | 159 | 259 | 418 | 228 | 61 | 17 | 23 | 40 | 34 |
| NHL totals | | | 3 | 0 | 0 | 0 | 0 | — | — | — | — | — |
