= Folkish =

Folkish may refer to:

- Folklore, the body of expressive culture shared by a particular group of people, culture or subculture
- Völkisch movement, a German ethnic nationalist movement

== See also ==
- Folk (disambiguation)
- Volk (disambiguation)
- Vulgar (disambiguation)
