= Folk =

Folk or Folks may refer to:

== Sociology ==
- Nation
- People
- Folklore
  - Folk art
  - Folk dance
  - Folk hero
  - Folk horror
  - Folk music
    - Folk metal
    - Folk punk
    - Folk rock
  - Folk religion
- Folk taxonomy

== Arts, entertainment, and media ==
- Folk Plus or Folk +, an Albanian folk music channel
- Folks (band), a Japanese band
- Folks!, a 1992 American film

== People with the name ==
- Bill Folk (born 1927), Canadian ice hockey player
- Chad Folk (born 1972), Canadian football player
- Elizabeth Folk (c. 16th century), British martyr; one of the Colchester Martyrs
- Eugene R. Folk (1924–2003), American ophthalmologist
- Joseph W. Folk (1869–1923), American lawyer, reformer, and politician
- Kevin Folk (born 1980), Canadian curler
- Nick Folk (born 1984), American football player
- Rick Folk (born 1950), Canadian curler
- Robert Folk (born 1949), American film composer
- Robert L. Folk (1925–2018), American geologist and sedimentary petrologist

== Other uses ==
- Folk classification, a type of classification in geology
- Folks Nation, an alliance of American street gangs
- Another way to be referring to one's parents, or just their mother or father.

== See also ==
- Folkish (disambiguation)
- Volk (German word)
