= Plain folks =

Logical fallacy

"Plain folks" is a form of propaganda and a logical fallacy. A plain folks argument is one in which the speaker presents themselves as an average Joe — a common person who can understand and empathize with a listener's concerns.

It is like the propaganda, bandwagon. The most important part of this appeal is the speaker's portrayal of themselves as someone who has had a similar experience to the listener and knows why they may be skeptical or cautious about accepting the speaker's point of view. In this way, the speaker gives the audience a sense of trust and comfort, believing that the speaker and the audience share common goals and that they thus should agree with the speaker.
