= 1951–52 Montreal Canadiens season =

NHL hockey team season

1951–52 Montreal Canadiens
- League: 2nd NHL
- 1951–52 record: 34–26–10
- Home record: 22–8–5
- Road record: 12–18–5
- Goals for: 195
- Goals against: 164

Team information
- General manager: Frank J. Selke
- Coach: Dick Irvin
- Captain: Emile Bouchard
- Arena: Montreal Forum

Team leaders
- Goals: Bernie Geoffrion (30)
- Assists: Elmer Lach (50)
- Points: Elmer Lach (65)
- Penalty minutes: Doug Harvey (82)
- Wins: Gerry McNeil (34)
- Goals against average: Gerry McNeil (2.34)

The 1951–52 Montreal Canadiens season was the club's 43rd season of play. After qualifying for the playoffs in second place, the Canadiens defeated the Boston Bruins to advance to the final series. The Detroit Red Wings would sweep the Canadiens in the finals, four games to none.

== Regular season ==
=== Final standings ===
National Hockey League
		GP	W	L	T	GF	GA	DIFF	Pts
1	Detroit Red Wings	70	44	14	12	215	133	+82	100
2	Montreal Canadiens	70	34	26	10	195	164	+31	78
3	Toronto Maple Leafs	70	29	25	16	168	157	+11	74
4	Boston Bruins	70	25	29	16	162	176	−14	66
5	New York Rangers	70	23	34	13	192	219	−27	59
6	Chicago Black Hawks	70	17	44	9	158	241	−83	43

=== Record vs. opponents ===
1951–52 NHL Records
Team	BOS	CHI	DET	MTL	NYR	TOR
Boston	—	9–3–2	3–8–3	7–5–2	4–6–4	2–7–5
Chicago	3–9–2	—	2–12	1–10–3	5–7–2	6–6–2
Detroit	8–3–3	12–2	—	9–2–3	9–3–2	6–4–4
Montreal	5–7–2	10–1–3	2–9–3	—	9–4–1	8–5–1
New York	6–4–4	7–5–2	3–9–2	4–9–1	—	3–7–4
Toronto	7–2–5	6–6–2	4–6–4	5–8–1	7–3–4	—

== Schedule and results ==
1951–52 regular season
October

Game	Result	Date	Score	Opponent	Record
1	W	October 11, 1951	4–2	Chicago Black Hawks (1951–52)	1–0–0
2	L	October 13, 1951	1–2	Boston Bruins (1951–52)	1–1–0
3	W	October 14, 1951	4–3	@ Boston Bruins (1951–52)	2–1–0
4	W	October 18, 1951	3–2	New York Rangers (1951–52)	3–1–0
5	L	October 20, 1951	0–3	@ Detroit Red Wings (1951–52)	3–2–0
6	L	October 22, 1951	1–3	Detroit Red Wings (1951–52)	3–3–0
7	T	October 25, 1951	2–2	@ Chicago Black Hawks (1951–52)	3–3–1
8	L	October 28, 1951	1–2	@ New York Rangers (1951–52)	3–4–1
9	W	October 29, 1951	6–1	New York Rangers (1951–52)	4–4–1
10	L	October 31, 1951	0–1	@ Toronto Maple Leafs (1951–52)	4–5–1

November

Game	Result	Date	Score	Opponent	Record
11	L	November 1, 1951	2–4	Toronto Maple Leafs (1951–52)	4–6–1
12	L	November 3, 1951	2–3	Detroit Red Wings (1951–52)	4–7–1
13	W	November 8, 1951	4–2	Boston Bruins (1951–52)	5–7–1
14	W	November 10, 1951	4–2	Chicago Black Hawks (1951–52)	6–7–1
15	T	November 11, 1951	3–3	@ Detroit Red Wings (1951–52)	6–7–2
16	W	November 17, 1951	3–2	New York Rangers (1951–52)	7–7–2
17	T	November 18, 1951	3–3	@ Boston Bruins (1951–52)	7–7–3
18	L	November 22, 1951	1–5	@ Chicago Black Hawks (1951–52)	7–8–3
19	L	November 24, 1951	2–4	@ Toronto Maple Leafs (1951–52)	7–9–3
20	L	November 25, 1951	1–2	@ New York Rangers (1951–52)	7–10–3
21	W	November 29, 1951	5–1	Toronto Maple Leafs (1951–52)	8–10–3

December

Game	Result	Date	Score	Opponent	Record
22	W	December 1, 1951	4–2	Chicago Black Hawks (1951–52)	9–10–3
23	L	December 2, 1951	1–4	@ Boston Bruins (1951–52)	9–11–3
24	L	December 8, 1951	0–3	Detroit Red Wings (1951–52)	9–12–3
25	L	December 9, 1951	2–3	@ Detroit Red Wings (1951–52)	9–13–3
26	T	December 13, 1951	1–1	@ Chicago Black Hawks (1951–52)	9–13–4
27	W	December 15, 1951	3–1	Boston Bruins (1951–52)	10–13–4
28	W	December 16, 1951	4–2	@ Boston Bruins (1951–52)	11–13–4
29	L	December 19, 1951	2–4	@ New York Rangers (1951–52)	11–14–4
30	W	December 20, 1951	4–1	Toronto Maple Leafs (1951–52)	12–14–4
31	W	December 22, 1951	5–1	Chicago Black Hawks (1951–52)	13–14–4
32	L	December 23, 1951	0–4	@ Detroit Red Wings (1951–52)	13–15–4
33	W	December 26, 1951	3–2	@ Toronto Maple Leafs (1951–52)	14–15–4
34	W	December 29, 1951	7–2	New York Rangers (1951–52)	15–15–4
35	W	December 31, 1951	5–3	@ Detroit Red Wings (1951–52)	16–15–4

January

Game	Result	Date	Score	Opponent	Record
36	W	January 1, 1952	3–0	@ Chicago Black Hawks (1951–52)	17–15–4
37	W	January 3, 1952	3–1	Toronto Maple Leafs (1951–52)	18–15–4
38	L	January 5, 1952	2–3	Boston Bruins (1951–52)	18–16–4
39	W	January 12, 1952	8–3	Chicago Black Hawks (1951–52)	19–16–4
40	T	January 13, 1952	2–2	@ New York Rangers (1951–52)	19–16–5
41	T	January 17, 1952	2–2	Toronto Maple Leafs (1951–52)	19–16–6
42	L	January 19, 1952	0–4	Detroit Red Wings (1951–52)	19–17–6
43	L	January 20, 1952	1–2	@ Boston Bruins (1951–52)	19–18–6
44	W	January 23, 1952	4–2	@ Toronto Maple Leafs (1951–52)	20–18–6
45	W	January 24, 1952	4–1	@ Chicago Black Hawks (1951–52)	21–18–6
46	W	January 26, 1952	5–3	Boston Bruins (1951–52)	22–18–6
47	W	January 27, 1952	5–3	@ New York Rangers (1951–52)	23–18–6
48	W	January 31, 1952	1–0	New York Rangers (1951–52)	24–18–6

February

Game	Result	Date	Score	Opponent	Record
49	T	February 2, 1952	2–2	Detroit Red Wings (1951–52)	24–18–7
50	L	February 3, 1952	0–1	@ Boston Bruins (1951–52)	24–19–7
51	L	February 7, 1952	3–5	@ Detroit Red Wings (1951–52)	24–20–7
52	L	February 9, 1952	2–3	@ Toronto Maple Leafs (1951–52)	24–21–7
53	W	February 10, 1952	3–2	@ Chicago Black Hawks (1951–52)	25–21–7
54	W	February 14, 1952	3–1	Toronto Maple Leafs (1951–52)	26–21–7
55	W	February 16, 1952	5–1	New York Rangers (1951–52)	27–21–7
56	L	February 17, 1952	2–3	@ New York Rangers (1951–52)	27–22–7
57	T	February 21, 1952	3–3	Boston Bruins (1951–52)	27–22–8
58	W	February 23, 1952	7–0	Chicago Black Hawks (1951–52)	28–22–8
59	W	February 28, 1952	3–2	Detroit Red Wings (1951–52)	29–22–8

March

Game	Result	Date	Score	Opponent	Record
60	W	March 1, 1952	3–1	New York Rangers (1951–52)	30–22–8
61	W	March 2, 1952	6–4	@ Chicago Black Hawks (1951–52)	31–22–8
62	L	March 5, 1952	2–6	@ Toronto Maple Leafs (1951–52)	31–23–8
63	T	March 8, 1952	4–4	Chicago Black Hawks (1951–52)	31–23–9
64	W	March 9, 1952	2–0	@ New York Rangers (1951–52)	32–23–9
65	W	March 13, 1952	3–1	Toronto Maple Leafs (1951–52)	33–23–9
66	L	March 15, 1952	0–2	Boston Bruins (1951–52)	33–24–9
67	L	March 16, 1952	1–2	@ Boston Bruins (1951–52)	33–25–9
68	W	March 19, 1952	3–0	@ Toronto Maple Leafs (1951–52)	34–25–9
69	T	March 22, 1952	3–3	Detroit Red Wings (1951–52)	34–25–10
70	L	March 23, 1952	2–7	@ Detroit Red Wings (1951–52)	34–26–10

Legend: Win (2 points) Loss (0 points) Tie (1 point)

== Player statistics ==
=== Regular season ===
==== Scoring ====
Player	Pos	GP	G	A	Pts	PIM
Elmer Lach	C	70	15	50	65	36
Bernie Geoffrion	RW	67	30	24	54	66
Maurice Richard	RW	48	27	17	44	44
Paul Meger	LW	69	24	18	42	44
Billy Reay	C	68	7	34	41	20
Dick Gamble	LW	64	23	17	40	8
Floyd Curry	RW	64	20	18	38	10
Bert Olmstead	LW	69	7	28	35	49
Dickie Moore	LW	33	18	15	33	44
Doug Harvey	D	68	6	23	29	82
Ken Mosdell	C	44	5	11	16	19
Dollard St. Laurent	D	40	3	10	13	30
Emile Bouchard	D	60	3	9	12	45
John McCormack	C	54	2	10	12	4
Tom Johnson	D	67	0	7	7	76
Ross Lowe	D/LW	31	1	5	6	42
Bud MacPherson	D	54	2	1	3	24
Paul Masnick	C	15	1	2	3	2
Lorne Davis	RW	3	1	1	2	2
Gerry Couture	RW	10	0	1	1	4
Calum MacKay	LW	12	0	1	1	8
Gene Achtymichuk	C	1	0	0	0	0
Garry Edmundson	LW	1	0	0	0	2
Bob Fryday	RW	3	0	0	0	0
Cliff Malone	RW	3	0	0	0	0
Donnie Marshall	LW	1	0	0	0	0
Gerry McNeil	G	70	0	0	0	0

==== Goaltending ====
Player	MIN	GP	W	L	T	GA	GAA	SO
Gerry McNeil	4200	70	34	26	10	164	2.34	5
Team:	4200	70	34	26	10	164	2.34	5

=== Playoffs ===
==== Scoring ====
Player	Pos	GP	G	A	Pts	PIM
Floyd Curry	RW	11	4	3	7	6
Maurice Richard	RW	11	4	2	6	6
Bernie Geoffrion	RW	11	3	1	4	6
Billy Reay	C	10	2	2	4	7
Elmer Lach	C	11	1	2	3	4
Doug Harvey	D	11	0	3	3	8
Paul Meger	LW	11	0	3	3	2
Dollard St. Laurent	D	9	0	3	3	6
Eddie Mazur	D/LW	5	2	0	2	4
Dickie Moore	LW	11	1	1	2	12
Emile Bouchard	D	11	0	2	2	14
Dick Gamble	LW	7	0	2	2	0
Tom Johnson	D	11	1	0	1	2
Paul Masnick	C	6	1	0	1	12
Ken Mosdell	C	2	1	0	1	0
Bert Olmstead	LW	11	0	1	1	4
Garry Edmundson	LW	2	0	0	0	4
Stan Long	D	3	0	0	0	0
Bud MacPherson	D	11	0	0	0	0
Gerry McNeil	G	11	0	0	0	0

==== Goaltending ====
Player	MIN	GP	W	L	GA	GAA	SO
Gerry McNeil	688	11	4	7	23	2.01	1
Team:	688	11	4	7	23	2.01	1

Note:

Pos = Position;GP = Games played; G = Goals; A = Assists; Pts = Points; PIM = Penalty minutes; +/- = Plus/minus; PPG = Power-play goals; SHG = Short-handed goals; GWG = Game-winning goals
Pos = Position;GP = Games played; Min, TOI = Minutes played; W = Wins; L = Losses; T,T/OT = Ties; OTL = Overtime losses; GA = Goals-against; GAA = Goals-against average; SO = Shutouts; SA = Shots against; SV = Shots saved;SV% = Save percentage;

== See also ==
- 1951–52 NHL season
