= Bill Folk =

Canadian ice hockey player (1927–1976)

- Born: July 11, 1927; Regina, Saskatchewan, Canada
- Died: April 21, 1976 (aged 48); Regina, Saskatchewan, Canada
- Height: 5 ft 11 in (180 cm)
- Weight: 190 lb (86 kg; 13 st 8 lb)
- Position: Defence
- Shot: Left
- Played for: Detroit Red Wings
- Playing career: 1947–1966

William Joseph Folk (July 11, 1927 – April 21, 1976) was a Canadian professional ice hockey defenceman who played 12 games in the National Hockey League for the Detroit Red Wings during the 1951–52 and 1952–53 seasons. The rest of his career, which lasted from 1947 to 1966, was spent in the minor leagues.

He died after a long illness in 1976, at the age of 48.

== Career statistics ==
=== Regular season and playoffs ===
| | | | Regular season | | | | | Playoffs |
| Season | Team | League | GP | G | A | Pts | PIM | GP | G | A | Pts | PIM |
|---|---|---|---|---|---|---|---|---|---|---|---|---|
| 1944–45 | Regina Abbotts | SJHL | 16 | 1 | 2 | 3 | 54 | — | — | — | — | — |
| 1945–46 | Regina Abbotts | SJHL | 18 | 3 | 1 | 4 | 30 | 7 | 2 | 1 | 3 | 26 |
| 1946–47 | Regina Capitals | SJHL | 29 | 7 | 5 | 12 | 40 | 6 | 2 | 0 | 2 | 10 |
| 1947–48 | Boston Olympics | EAHL | 19 | 2 | 4 | 6 | 39 | — | — | — | — | — |
| 1947–48 | Boston Olympics | QSHL | 38 | 5 | 5 | 10 | 64 | — | — | — | — | — |
| 1948–49 | Omaha Knights | USHL | 62 | 4 | 14 | 18 | 84 | 4 | 0 | 2 | 2 | 6 |
| 1949–50 | Omaha Knights | USHL | 64 | 14 | 33 | 47 | 78 | — | — | — | — | — |
| 1950–51 | Indianapolis Capitals | AHL | 64 | 4 | 26 | 30 | 58 | 3 | 0 | 1 | 1 | 4 |
| 1950–51 | Omaha Knights | USHL | — | — | — | — | — | 6 | 7 | 3 | 10 | 16 |
| 1951–52 | Indianapolis Capitals | AHL | 50 | 4 | 14 | 18 | 56 | — | — | — | — | — |
| 1951–52 | Detroit Red Wings | NHL | 4 | 0 | 0 | 0 | 2 | — | — | — | — | — |
| 1952–53 | Detroit Red Wings | NHL | 8 | 0 | 0 | 0 | 2 | — | — | — | — | — |
| 1952–53 | Edmonton Flyers | WHL | 56 | 9 | 19 | 28 | 74 | 15 | 1 | 7 | 8 | 24 |
| 1953–54 | Edmonton Flyers | WHL | 49 | 4 | 14 | 18 | 66 | — | — | — | — | — |
| 1954–55 | Providence Reds | AHL | 45 | 5 | 21 | 26 | 52 | — | — | — | — | — |
| 1955–56 | Saskatoon Quakers | WHL | 51 | 6 | 14 | 20 | 66 | — | — | — | — | — |
| 1955–56 | Providence Reds | AHL | 15 | 1 | 8 | 9 | 18 | 9 | 2 | 3 | 5 | 15 |
| 1956–57 | Providence Reds | AHL | 60 | 1 | 15 | 16 | 56 | 4 | 0 | 1 | 1 | 6 |
| 1957–58 | Vancouver Canucks | WHL | 68 | 7 | 21 | 28 | 72 | 11 | 1 | 9 | 10 | 18 |
| 1958–59 | Winnipeg Warriors | WHL | 56 | 7 | 25 | 32 | 61 | 7 | 0 | 6 | 6 | 6 |
| 1959–60 | Winnipeg Warriors | WHL | 56 | 4 | 32 | 36 | 53 | — | — | — | — | — |
| 1960–61 | Spokane Comets | WHL | 65 | 8 | 23 | 31 | 68 | 2 | 0 | 0 | 0 | 2 |
| 1961–62 | Spokane Comets | WHL | 2 | 0 | 1 | 1 | 4 | — | — | — | — | — |
| 1964–65 | Regina Capitals | SSHL | 8 | 3 | 6 | 9 | 6 | 5 | 1 | 1 | 2 | 9 |
| 1965–66 | Regina Capitals | SSHL | 6 | 0 | 8 | 8 | 10 | — | — | — | — | — |
| WHL totals | | | 403 | 45 | 149 | 194 | 464 | 35 | 2 | 22 | 24 | 50 |
| NHL totals | | | 12 | 0 | 0 | 0 | 4 | — | — | — | — | — |
