= 1951–52 Toronto Maple Leafs season =

NHL hockey team season

1951–52 Toronto Maple Leafs
- League: 3rd NHL
- 1951–52 record: 29–25–16
- Home record: 17–10–8
- Road record: 12–15–8
- Goals for: 168
- Goals against: 157

Team information
- General manager: Conn Smythe
- Coach: Joe Primeau
- Captain: Ted Kennedy
- Arena: Maple Leaf Gardens

Team leaders
- Goals: Sid Smith (27)
- Assists: Ted Kennedy (33)
- Points: Sid Smith (57)
- Penalty minutes: Fern Flaman (110)
- Wins: Al Rollins (29)
- Goals against average: Al Rollins (2.22)

The 1951–52 Toronto Maple Leafs season was Toronto's 35th season in the National Hockey League (NHL). The team made the playoffs for the sixth year in a row, but lost in the semifinals.

== Regular season ==
=== Final standings ===
National Hockey League
		GP	W	L	T	GF	GA	DIFF	Pts
1	Detroit Red Wings	70	44	14	12	215	133	+82	100
2	Montreal Canadiens	70	34	26	10	195	164	+31	78
3	Toronto Maple Leafs	70	29	25	16	168	157	+11	74
4	Boston Bruins	70	25	29	16	162	176	−14	66
5	New York Rangers	70	23	34	13	192	219	−27	59
6	Chicago Black Hawks	70	17	44	9	158	241	−83	43

=== Record vs. opponents ===
1951–52 NHL Records
Team	BOS	CHI	DET	MTL	NYR	TOR
Boston	—	9–3–2	3–8–3	7–5–2	4–6–4	2–7–5
Chicago	3–9–2	—	2–12	1–10–3	5–7–2	6–6–2
Detroit	8–3–3	12–2	—	9–2–3	9–3–2	6–4–4
Montreal	5–7–2	10–1–3	2–9–3	—	9–4–1	8–5–1
New York	6–4–4	7–5–2	3–9–2	4–9–1	—	3–7–4
Toronto	7–2–5	6–6–2	4–6–4	5–8–1	7–3–4	—

== Schedule and results ==
1951–52 regular season
October

Game	Result	Date	Score	Opponent	Record
1	L	October 13, 1951	1–3	Chicago Black Hawks (1951–52)	0–1–0
2	W	October 14, 1951	3–2	@ Detroit Red Wings (1951–52)	1–1–0
3	W	October 17, 1951	4–2	Boston Bruins (1951–52)	2–1–0
4	L	October 20, 1951	2–3	New York Rangers (1951–52)	2–2–0
5	T	October 21, 1951	1–1	@ Chicago Black Hawks (1951–52)	2–2–1
6	L	October 27, 1951	1–2	Detroit Red Wings (1951–52)	2–3–1
7	T	October 29, 1951	2–2	@ Detroit Red Wings (1951–52)	2–3–2
8	W	October 31, 1951	1–0	Montreal Canadiens (1951–52)	3–3–2

November

Game	Result	Date	Score	Opponent	Record
9	W	November 1, 1951	4–2	@ Montreal Canadiens (1951–52)	4–3–2
10	L	November 3, 1951	1–2	New York Rangers (1951–52)	4–4–2
11	W	November 7, 1951	1–0	Chicago Black Hawks (1951–52)	5–4–2
12	W	November 8, 1951	3–1	@ Chicago Black Hawks (1951–52)	6–4–2
13	T	November 10, 1951	3–3	Detroit Red Wings (1951–52)	6–4–3
14	T	November 11, 1951	1–1	@ Boston Bruins (1951–52)	6–4–4
15	T	November 14, 1951	2–2	@ New York Rangers (1951–52)	6–4–5
16	T	November 17, 1951	1–1	Boston Bruins (1951–52)	6–4–6
17	L	November 18, 1951	0–1	@ Chicago Black Hawks (1951–52)	6–5–6
18	W	November 21, 1951	5–1	Chicago Black Hawks (1951–52)	7–5–6
19	W	November 24, 1951	4–2	Montreal Canadiens (1951–52)	8–5–6
20	W	November 25, 1951	4–1	@ Boston Bruins (1951–52)	9–5–6
21	L	November 29, 1951	1–5	@ Montreal Canadiens (1951–52)	9–6–6

December

Game	Result	Date	Score	Opponent	Record
22	W	December 1, 1951	8–2	New York Rangers (1951–52)	10–6–6
23	W	December 2, 1951	2–1	@ Detroit Red Wings (1951–52)	11–6–6
24	T	December 5, 1951	2–2	Detroit Red Wings (1951–52)	11–6–7
25	W	December 8, 1951	3–1	Chicago Black Hawks (1951–52)	12–6–7
26	L	December 9, 1951	2–7	@ New York Rangers (1951–52)	12–7–7
27	L	December 13, 1951	1–3	@ Detroit Red Wings (1951–52)	12–8–7
28	W	December 15, 1951	4–1	New York Rangers (1951–52)	13–8–7
29	L	December 16, 1951	3–4	@ Chicago Black Hawks (1951–52)	13–9–7
30	L	December 20, 1951	1–4	@ Montreal Canadiens (1951–52)	13–10–7
31	W	December 22, 1951	3–2	Boston Bruins (1951–52)	14–10–7
32	L	December 23, 1951	2–4	@ Boston Bruins (1951–52)	14–11–7
33	L	December 26, 1951	2–3	Montreal Canadiens (1951–52)	14–12–7
34	W	December 29, 1951	4–0	Boston Bruins (1951–52)	15–12–7
35	T	December 30, 1951	2–2	@ New York Rangers (1951–52)	15–12–8

January

Game	Result	Date	Score	Opponent	Record
36	L	January 3, 1952	1–3	@ Montreal Canadiens (1951–52)	15–13–8
37	W	January 5, 1952	2–1	Chicago Black Hawks (1951–52)	16–13–8
38	W	January 9, 1952	2–1	@ New York Rangers (1951–52)	17–13–8
39	W	January 12, 1952	5–3	Detroit Red Wings (1951–52)	18–13–8
40	L	January 13, 1952	1–2	@ Detroit Red Wings (1951–52)	18–14–8
41	W	January 15, 1952	1–0	@ Boston Bruins (1951–52)	19–14–8
42	T	January 17, 1952	2–2	@ Montreal Canadiens (1951–52)	19–14–9
43	W	January 19, 1952	6–2	Boston Bruins (1951–52)	20–14–9
44	W	January 20, 1952	3–1	@ Chicago Black Hawks (1951–52)	21–14–9
45	L	January 23, 1952	2–4	Montreal Canadiens (1951–52)	21–15–9
46	T	January 24, 1952	2–2	@ Detroit Red Wings (1951–52)	21–15–10
47	T	January 26, 1952	3–3	New York Rangers (1951–52)	21–15–11
48	W	January 27, 1952	3–0	@ Boston Bruins (1951–52)	22–15–11

February

Game	Result	Date	Score	Opponent	Record
49	T	February 2, 1952	1–1	Boston Bruins (1951–52)	22–15–12
50	L	February 3, 1952	1–3	@ Chicago Black Hawks (1951–52)	22–16–12
51	W	February 9, 1952	3–2	Montreal Canadiens (1951–52)	23–16–12
52	W	February 10, 1952	4–3	@ New York Rangers (1951–52)	24–16–12
53	L	February 13, 1952	1–3	Detroit Red Wings (1951–52)	24–17–12
54	L	February 14, 1952	1–3	@ Montreal Canadiens (1951–52)	24–18–12
55	T	February 16, 1952	2–2	Chicago Black Hawks (1951–52)	24–18–13
56	T	February 19, 1952	3–3	New York Rangers (1951–52)	24–18–14
57	L	February 21, 1952	1–5	@ Chicago Black Hawks (1951–52)	24–19–14
58	L	February 23, 1952	1–3	Detroit Red Wings (1951–52)	24–20–14
59	W	February 27, 1952	3–1	@ New York Rangers (1951–52)	25–20–14

March

Game	Result	Date	Score	Opponent	Record
60	T	March 1, 1952	1–1	Boston Bruins (1951–52)	25–20–15
61	T	March 2, 1952	2–2	@ Boston Bruins (1951–52)	25–20–16
62	W	March 5, 1952	6–2	Montreal Canadiens (1951–52)	26–20–16
63	W	March 8, 1952	6–3	Detroit Red Wings (1951–52)	27–20–16
64	L	March 9, 1952	1–6	@ Detroit Red Wings (1951–52)	27–21–16
65	L	March 13, 1952	1–3	@ Montreal Canadiens (1951–52)	27–22–16
66	W	March 15, 1952	5–2	New York Rangers (1951–52)	28–22–16
67	W	March 16, 1952	4–2	@ New York Rangers (1951–52)	29–22–16
68	L	March 19, 1952	0–3	Montreal Canadiens (1951–52)	29–23–16
69	L	March 22, 1952	2–3	Chicago Black Hawks (1951–52)	29–24–16
70	L	March 23, 1952	2–4	@ Boston Bruins (1951–52)	29–25–16

Legend: Win (2 points) Loss (0 points) Tie (1 point)

== Player statistics ==
=== Regular season ===
Scoring

Player	GP	G	A	Pts	PIM
Sid Smith	70	27	30	57	6
Ted Kennedy	70	19	33	52	33
Tod Sloan	68	25	23	48	89
Max Bentley	69	24	17	41	40
Cal Gardner	70	15	26	41	40
Harry Watson	70	22	17	39	18
Jimmy Thomson	70	0	25	25	86
Howie Meeker	54	9	14	23	50
Hugh Bolton	60	3	13	16	73
Danny Lewicki	51	4	9	13	26
Joe Klukay	43	4	8	12	6
Gus Mortson	65	1	10	11	106
Fleming MacKell	32	2	8	10	16
Bob Solinger	24	5	3	8	4
Fern Flaman	61	0	7	7	110
George Armstrong	20	3	3	6	30
Ray Timgren	50	2	4	6	11
Bill Juzda	46	1	4	5	65
Rudy Migay	19	2	1	3	12
Leo Boivin	2	0	1	1	0
Jim Morrison	17	0	1	1	4
Earl Balfour	3	0	0	0	2
Turk Broda	1	0	0	0	0
Tim Horton	4	0	0	0	8
Frank Mathers	2	0	0	0	0
John McLellan	2	0	0	0	0
Eric Nesterenko	1	0	0	0	0
Al Rollins	70	0	0	0	4
Bob Sabourin	1	0	0	0	2

Goaltending

Player	MIN	GP	W	L	T	GA	GAA	SA	SV	SV%	SO
Al Rollins	4170	70	29	24	16	154	2.22				5
Turk Broda	30	1	0	1	0	3	6.00				0
Team:	4200	70	29	25	16	157	2.24				5

=== Playoffs ===
Scoring

Player	GP	G	A	Pts	PIM
Joe Klukay	4	1	1	2	0
Fern Flaman	4	0	2	2	18
Max Bentley	4	1	0	1	2
Harry Watson	4	1	0	1	2
Ray Timgren	4	0	1	1	0
George Armstrong	4	0	0	0	2
Earl Balfour	1	0	0	0	0
Hugh Bolton	3	0	0	0	4
Turk Broda	2	0	0	0	0
Cal Gardner	3	0	0	0	2
Bill Juzda	3	0	0	0	2
Ted Kennedy	4	0	0	0	4
Howie Meeker	4	0	0	0	11
Jim Morrison	2	0	0	0	0
Gus Mortson	4	0	0	0	8
Al Rollins	2	0	0	0	0
Tod Sloan	4	0	0	0	10
Sid Smith	4	0	0	0	0
Jimmy Thomson	4	0	0	0	25

Goaltending

Player	MIN	GP	W	L	T	GA	GAA	SA	SV	SV%	SO
Turk Broda	120	2	0	2		7	3.50				0
Al Rollins	120	2	0	2		6	3.00				0
Team:	240	4	0	4		13	3.25				0

== See also ==
- 1951–52 NHL season
