= Lorne Anderson =

Canadian ice hockey player

- Born: July 26, 1931; Renfrew, Ontario, Canada
- Died: March 20, 1984 (aged 52); Renfrew, Ontario, Canada
- Height: 5 ft 11 in (180 cm)
- Weight: 166 lb (75 kg; 11 st 12 lb)
- Position: Goaltender
- Caught: Right
- Played for: New York Rangers
- Playing career: 1947–1961

Lawrence Robert Anderson (July 26, 1931 – March 20, 1984) was a Canadian professional ice hockey goaltender who played three games in the National Hockey League (NHL) with the New York Rangers during the 1951–52 season. In his third and final NHL game, he gave up the fastest hat trick in NHL history, in 21 seconds, to Bill Mosienko of the Chicago Black Hawks on March 23, 1952. Anderson was born in Renfrew, Ontario.

== Career statistics ==
=== Regular season and playoffs ===
			Regular season								Playoffs
Season	Team	League	GP	W	L	T	MIN	GA	SO	GAA	GP	W	L	MIN	GA	SO	GAA
1947–48	Atlantic City Sea Gulls	EAHL	2	—	—	—	120	15	0	7.50	—	—	—	—	—	—	—
1948–49	Renfrew Lions	NOJHA	10	8	2	0	610	38	1	3.74	19	15	4	1160	72	1	3.72
1949–50	Renfrew Lions	NOJHA	12	—	—	—	720	46	0	3.83	6	—	—	360	23	0	3.83
1949–50	Pembroke Lumber Kings	LSLHL	—	—	—	—	—	—	—	—	2	1	1	120	11	0	5.50
1950–51	Atlantic City Sea Gulls	EAHL	52	—	—	—	3120	213	0	4.10	—	—	—	—	—	—	—
1951–52	New York Rangers	NHL	3	1	2	0	180	18	0	6.00	—	—	—	—	—	—	—
1951–52	Boston Olympics	EAHL	2	0	2	0	120	6	0	3.00	—	—	—	—	—	—	—
1951–52	New York Rovers	EAHL	61	25	34	2	3685	231	1	3.76	—	—	—	—	—	—	—
1951–52	New Haven Tomahawks	EAHL	—	—	—	—	—	—	—	—	2	—	—	120	7	0	3.50
1952–53	Sudbury Wolves	NOHA	48	31	15	2	2880	165	0	3.44	7	3	4	430	28	0	3.91
1952–53	Sudbury Wolves	Al-Cup	—	—	—	—	—	—	—	—	2	0	2	94	8	0	5.11
1953–54	Sudbury Wolves	NOHA	31	—	—	—	1860	92	1	2.97	7	3	4	420	19	1	2.71
1954–55	Sudbury Wolves	NOHA	57	—	—	—	3420	215	2	3.77	—	—	—	—	—	—	—
1955–56	North Bay Trappers	NOHA	52	—	—	—	3120	169	3	3.25	—	—	—	—	—	—	—
1956–57	Pembroke Lumber Kings	OHA Sr	32	—	—	—	1920	140	1	4.38	—	—	—	—	—	—	—
1958–59	Renfrew Lions	UOVHL	17	4	13	0	1020	112	0	6.59	—	—	—	—	—	—	—
1958–59	Pembroke Lumber Kings	UOVHL	—	—	—	—	—	—	—	—	9	6	3	540	36	0	4.00
1959–60	Pembroke Lumber Kings	UOVHL	9	7	2	0	540	24	2	2.67	6	2	4	360	25	0	4.17
1960–61	Pembroke Lumber Kings	UOVHL	28	8	15	5	1680	145	0	5.18	7	3	4	440	39	0	5.32
NHL totals			3	1	2	0	180	18	0	6.00	—	—	—	—	—	—	—
