= Metro Prystai =

Canadian ice hockey player

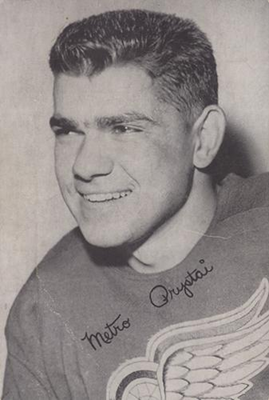
- Prystai in 1950s postcard
- Born: November 7, 1927 Yorkton, Saskatchewan, Canada
- Died: October 8, 2013 (aged 85) Wynyard, Saskatchewan, Canada
- Height: 5 ft 9 in (175 cm)
- Weight: 170 lb (77 kg; 12 st 2 lb)
- Position: Centre
- Shot: Left
- Played for: Chicago Black Hawks; Detroit Red Wings
- Playing career: 1947–1958

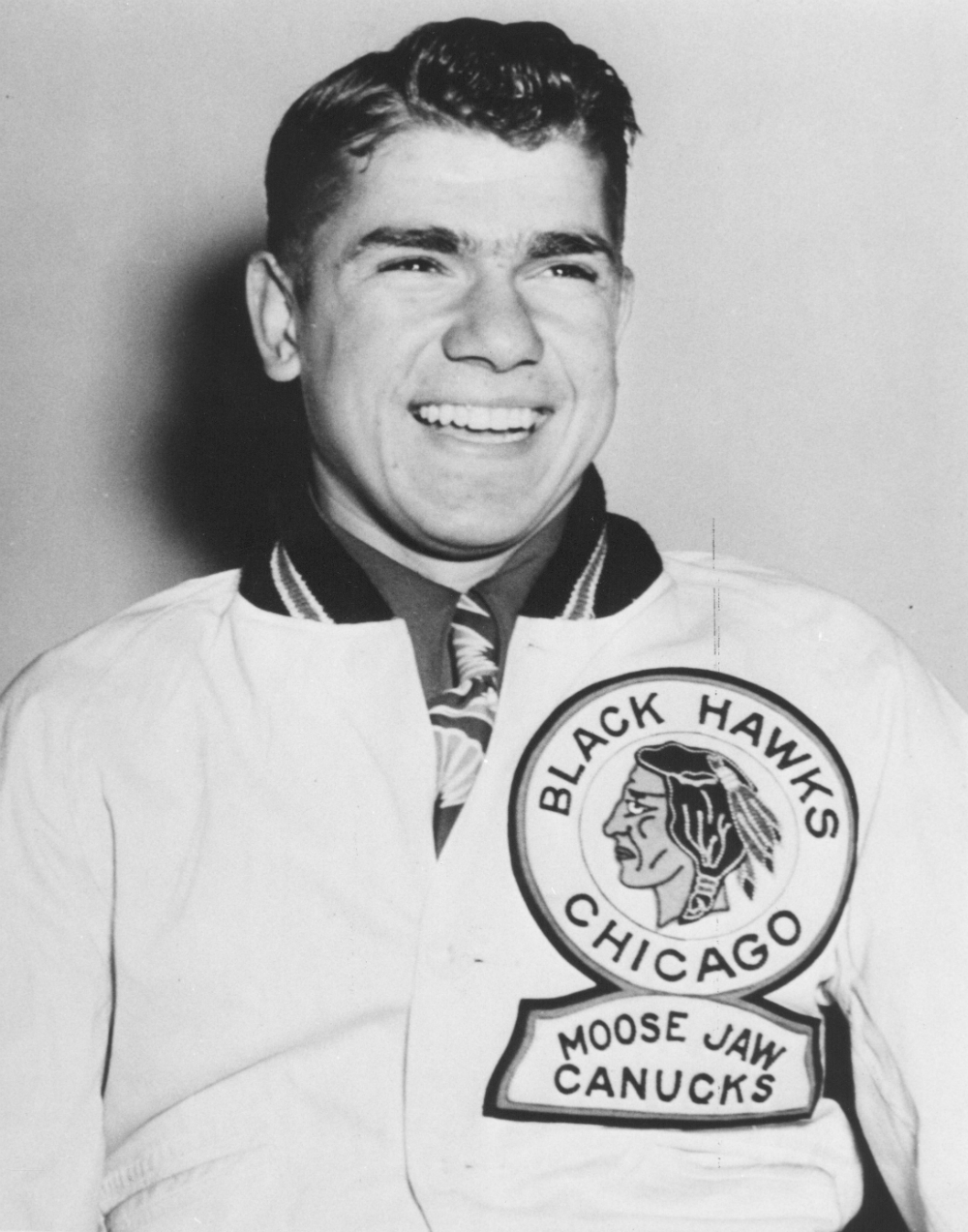
Prystai in 1947 as member of the Moose Jaw Canucks

Dmytro "Metro" Prystai Ukrainian: Дмитро Пристай; November 7, 1927 – October 8, 2013) was a Ukrainian-Canadian professional ice hockey forward.

Prystai began his National Hockey League career with the Chicago Black Hawks in 1947. He also played for the Detroit Red Wings. He left the NHL following the 1958 season, playing part of one season in the minors before retiring. He won two Stanley Cups with Detroit in 1952, 1954, and made three All-Star Game appearances in his 12-year NHL career.

After his hockey career Prystai operated an insurance company in Wynyard, Sask. Prystai was a widower with both spouses Evelyne and Mavis predeceasing him.

He died on October 8, 2013, in a nursing home in Wynyard, Saskatchewan. He was 85.

== Early life ==
Prystai's parents Harold and Annie Prystai were from Ternopil, Ukraine.

== Career statistics ==
=== Regular season and playoffs ===
| | | | Regular season | | | | | Playoffs |
| Season | Team | League | GP | G | A | Pts | PIM | GP | G | A | Pts | PIM |
|---|---|---|---|---|---|---|---|---|---|---|---|---|
| 1945-46 | Moose Jaw Canucks | SJHL |
| 1946-47 | Moose Jaw Canucks | SJHL | ? | 32 | 39 | 71 | 8 | — | — | — | — | — |
| 1947–48 | Chicago Black Hawks | NHL | 54 | 7 | 11 | 18 | 25 | — | — | — | — | — |
| 1948–49 | Chicago Black Hawks | NHL | 59 | 12 | 7 | 19 | 19 | — | — | — | — | — |
| 1949–50 | Chicago Black Hawks | NHL | 65 | 29 | 22 | 51 | 31 | — | — | — | — | — |
| 1950–51 | Detroit Red Wings | NHL | 62 | 20 | 17 | 37 | 27 | 3 | 1 | 0 | 1 | 0 |
| 1951–52 | Detroit Red Wings | NHL | 69 | 21 | 22 | 43 | 16 | 8 | 2 | 5 | 7 | 0 |
| 1952–53 | Detroit Red Wings | NHL | 70 | 16 | 34 | 50 | 12 | 6 | 4 | 4 | 8 | 2 |
| 1953–54 | Detroit Red Wings | NHL | 70 | 12 | 15 | 27 | 26 | 12 | 2 | 3 | 5 | 0 |
| 1954–55 | Detroit Red Wings | NHL | 12 | 2 | 3 | 5 | 9 | — | — | — | — | — |
| 1954–55 | Chicago Black Hawks | NHL | 57 | 11 | 13 | 24 | 28 | — | — | — | — | — |
| 1955–56 | Chicago Black Hawks | NHL | 8 | 1 | 3 | 4 | 8 | — | — | — | — | — |
| 1955–56 | Detroit Red Wings | NHL | 63 | 12 | 16 | 28 | 10 | 9 | 1 | 2 | 3 | 6 |
| 1956–57 | Detroit Red Wings | NHL | 70 | 7 | 15 | 22 | 16 | 5 | 2 | 0 | 2 | 0 |
| 1957–58 | Detroit Red Wings | NHL | 15 | 1 | 1 | 2 | 4 | — | — | — | — | — |
| 1957–58 | Edmonton Flyers | WHL | 21 | 13 | 14 | 27 | 6 | — | — | — | — | — |
| 1958–59 | Edmonton Flyers | WHL | 4 | 1 | 0 | 1 | 4 | — | — | — | — | — |
| 1969–70 | Yorkton Terriers | SSHL |
| NHL totals | | | 674 | 151 | 179 | 330 | 231 | 43 | 12 | 14 | 26 | 8 |
