= 1951–52 NHL season =

National Hockey League season

- League: National Hockey League
- Sport: Ice hockey
- Duration: October 11, 1951 – April 15, 1952
- Games: 70
- Teams: 6

Regular season
- Season champion: Detroit Red Wings
- Season MVP: Gordie Howe (Red Wings)
- Top scorer: Gordie Howe (Red Wings)

Stanley Cup
- Champions: Detroit Red Wings
- Runners-up: Montreal Canadiens

NHL seasons
- ← 1950–51 1952–53 →

The 1951–52 NHL season was the 35th season of the National Hockey League. Six teams played 70 games each. The Detroit Red Wings won the Stanley Cup by sweeping the Montreal Canadiens four games to none.

== League business ==
A long-standing feud between Boston president Weston Adams and general manager Art Ross ended on October 12, 1951, when Adams sold his stock in Boston Garden to Walter Brown.

The Chicago Black Hawks, who had made the mammoth nine player deal the previous season, now decided to make the largest cash deal for players to this time by paying $75,000 for Jim McFadden, George Gee, Jimmy Peters, Clare Martin, Clare Raglan and Max McNab.

The NHL and the Canadian Amateur Hockey Association (CAHA) agreed to a January 15 deadline for professional teams to call up players from the CAHA's Major Series of senior ice hockey. The agreement gave the NHL a source of emergency replacement players, and prevented teams in Canada from losing players during the Alexander Cup playoffs.

=== Rule changes ===
The league mandated that home teams would now wear a basic white uniform, while road teams will wear coloured uniforms. Before then, teams would often play with colored jerseys against each other, and with Television being in black white at the time, this helped viewers at home identify the two teams clearly.

The goal crease is enlarged from 3 ft × 7 ft (0.91 m × 2.13 m) to 4 ft × 8 ft (1.2 m × 2.4 m). The faceoff circles are expanded from a 10-foot (3.0 m) radius to a 15-foot (4.6 m) radius.

== Regular season ==
Conn Smythe offered $10,000 for anyone who found Bill Barilko, missing since August 26. Barilko and Dr. Henry Hudson had left Rupert House on James Bay in the doctor's light plane for Timmins, Ontario, after a weekend fishing trip and had not been found.

For the fourth straight season, the Detroit Red Wings finished first overall in the National Hockey League.

=== Highlights ===
On November 25 in Chicago, Chicago goalie Harry Lumley hurt a knee. At age 46, trainer Moe Roberts, who played his first game in the NHL for Boston in 1925–26, played the third period in goal for Chicago and did not yield a goal. Roberts would stand as the oldest person to ever play an NHL game until Gordie Howe returned to the NHL at age 51 in 1979.

Chicago was not drawing well and so they decided to experiment with afternoon games. It worked, as the largest crowd of the season, 13,600 fans, showed up for a January 20 game in which Chicago lost to Toronto 3–1.

Elmer Lach night was held March 8 at the Forum in Montreal as the Canadiens tied Chicago 4–4. 14,452 fans were on hand to see Lach presented with a car, rowboat, TV set, deep-freeze chest, bedroom and dining room suites, a refrigerator and many other articles.

On the last night of the season, March 23, 1952, with nothing at stake at Madison Square Garden, 3,254 fans saw Chicago's Bill Mosienko score the fastest hat trick in NHL history, 3 goals in 21 seconds. Lorne Anderson was the goaltender who gave up the goals to Chicago. Gus Bodnar also set a record with the fastest three assists in NHL history as he assisted on all three goals Mosienko scored. Chicago beat the New York Rangers 7–6.

=== Final standings ===
National Hockey League
		GP	W	L	T	GF	GA	DIFF	Pts
1	Detroit Red Wings	70	44	14	12	215	133	+82	100
2	Montreal Canadiens	70	34	26	10	195	164	+31	78
3	Toronto Maple Leafs	70	29	25	16	168	157	+11	74
4	Boston Bruins	70	25	29	16	162	176	−14	66
5	New York Rangers	70	23	34	13	192	219	−27	59
6	Chicago Black Hawks	70	17	44	9	158	241	−83	43

== Playoffs ==
Detroit finished 8–0, sweeping the defending Stanley Cup champions Toronto (the first time in NHL history the cup champs were swept in the first round) and Montreal, the first time a team had gone undefeated in the playoffs since the 1934–35 Montreal Maroons. The Wings scored 24 goals in the playoffs, compared to a combined five goals for their opponents. Detroit goaltender Terry Sawchuk never allowed a goal on home ice during the playoffs.

=== Playoff bracket ===
The top four teams in the league qualified for the playoffs. In the semifinals, the first-place team played the third-place team, while the second-place team faced the fourth-place team, with the winners advancing to the Stanley Cup Finals. In both rounds, teams competed in a best-of-seven series (scores in the bracket indicate the number of games won in each best-of-seven series).

Semifinals
1	Detroit	4
3	Toronto	0
2	Montreal	4
4	Boston	3

Stanley Cup Finals
1	Detroit	4
2	Montreal	0

=== Semifinals ===
==== (1) Detroit Red Wings vs. (3) Toronto Maple Leafs ====
March 25	Toronto Maple Leafs	0–3	Detroit Red Wings	Olympia Stadium	Recap
No scoring		First period	13:35 – Red Kelly (1)
No scoring		Second period	No scoring
No scoring		Third period	02:59 – pp – Sid Abel (1); 14:21 – Johnny Wilson (1)
Al Rollins		Goalie stats	Terry Sawchuck

March 27	Toronto Maple Leafs	0–1	Detroit Red Wings	Olympia Stadium	Recap
No scoring		First period	15:33 – pp – Johnny Wilson (2)
No scoring		Second period	No scoring
No scoring		Third period	No scoring
Al Rollins		Goalie stats	Terry Sawchuck

March 29	Detroit Red Wings	6–2	Toronto Maple Leafs	Maple Leaf Gardens	Recap
Marty Pavelich (1) – 10:56; Ted Lindsay (1) – pp – 16:57		First period	11:16 – Joe Klukay (1)
Johnny Wilson (3) – 02:10; Leo Reise Jr. (1) – 05:22		Second period	12:20 – Max Bentley (1)
Johnny Wilson (4) – 00:48; Benny Woit (1) – 08:47		Third period	No scoring
Terry Sawchuck		Goalie stats	Al Rollins

April 1	Detroit Red Wings	3–1	Toronto Maple Leafs	Maple Leaf Gardens	Recap
Ted Lindsay (2) – pp – 04:35; Tony Leswick (1) – pp – 09:32		First period	02:56 – Harry Watson (1)
Sid Abel (2) – 04:52		Second period	No scoring
No scoring		Third period	No scoring
Terry Sawchuck		Goalie stats	Al Rollins

Detroit won series 4–0

==== (2) Montreal Canadiens vs. (4) Boston Bruins ====
March 25	Boston Bruins	1–5	Montreal Canadiens	Forum de Montréal	Recap
No scoring		First period	05:45 – Maurice Richard (1)
Pentti Lund (1) – 06:27		Second period	00:30 – Dickie Moore (1); 14:16 – Maurice Richard (2)
No scoring		Third period	03:09 – Billy Reay (1); 19:24 – Floyd Curry (1)
Jim Henry		Goalie stats	Gerry McNeil

March 27	Boston Bruins	0–4	Montreal Canadiens	Forum de Montréal	Recap
No scoring		First period	04:01 – Ken Mosdell (1); 09:49 – pp – Bernie Geoffrion (1)
No scoring		Second period	13:39 – Bernie Geoffrion (2)
No scoring		Third period	17:14 – Bernie Geoffrion (3)
Jim Henry		Goalie stats	Gerry McNeil

March 30	Montreal Canadiens	1–4	Boston Bruins	Boston Garden	Recap
No scoring		First period	No scoring
No scoring		Second period	02:05 – Hal Laycoe (1); 02:38 – Dave Creighton (1); 03:07 – Ed Sandford (1)
Floyd Curry (2) – 15:24		Third period	06:14 – Fleming MacKell (1)
Gerry McNeil		Goalie stats	Jim Henry

April 1	Montreal Canadiens	2–3	Boston Bruins	Boston Garden	Recap
No scoring		First period	09:53 – Real Chevrefils (1)
Floyd Curry (3) – pp – 19:46		Second period	06:55 – Milt Schmidt (1)
Floyd Curry (4) – 06:48		Third period	14:37 – Fleming MacKell (2)
Gerry McNeil		Goalie stats	Jim Henry

April 3	Boston Bruins	1–0	Montreal Canadiens	Forum de Montréal	Recap
No scoring		First period	No scoring
No scoring		Second period	No scoring
Jack McIntyre (1) – 03:30		Third period	No scoring
Jim Henry		Goalie stats	Gerry McNeil

April 6	Montreal Canadiens	3–2	2OT	Boston Bruins	Boston Garden	Recap
No scoring		First period		02:53 – Milt Schmidt (2); 11:44 – Dave Creighton (2)
Eddie Mazur (1) – 04:53		Second period		No scoring
Maurice Richard (3) – 11:05		Third period		No scoring
Paul Masnick (1) – 07:49		Second overtime period		No scoring
Gerry McNeil		Goalie stats		Jim Henry

April 8	Boston Bruins	1–3	Montreal Canadiens	Forum de Montréal	Recap
Ed Sandford (2) – 12:25		First period	04:25 – Eddie Mazur (2)
No scoring		Second period	No scoring
No scoring		Third period	16:19 – Maurice Richard (4); 19:26 – en – Billy Reay (2)
Jim Henry		Goalie stats	Gerry McNeil

Montreal won series 4–3

=== Stanley Cup Finals ===
April 10	Detroit Red Wings	3–1	Montreal Canadiens	Forum de Montréal	Recap
No scoring		First period	No scoring
Tony Leswick (2) – 03:27		Second period	No scoring
Tony Leswick (3) – 07:59; Ted Lindsay (3) – en – 19:44		Third period	11:01 – Tom Johnson (1)
Terry Sawchuck		Goalie stats	Gerry McNeil

April 12	Detroit Red Wings	2–1	Montreal Canadiens	Forum de Montréal	Recap
Marty Pavelich (2) – 16:09		First period	18:37 – pp – Elmer Lach (1)
Ted Lindsay (4) – pp – 00:43		Second period	No scoring
No scoring		Third period	No scoring
Terry Sawchuck		Goalie stats	Gerry McNeil

April 13	Montreal Canadiens	0–3	Detroit Red Wings	Olympia Stadium	Recap
No scoring		First period	04:31 – pp – Gordie Howe (1)
No scoring		Second period	09:13 – Ted Lindsay (5)
No scoring		Third period	06:54 – Gordie Howe (2)
Gerry McNeil		Goalie stats	Terry Sawchuck

April 15	Montreal Canadiens	0–3	Detroit Red Wings	Olympia Stadium	Recap
No scoring		First period	06:50 – pp – Metro Prystai (1)
No scoring		Second period	19:39 – Glen Skov (1)
No scoring		Third period	07:35 – Metro Prystai (2)
Gerry McNeil		Goalie stats	Terry Sawchuck

Detroit won series 4–0

== Awards ==
Award winners
Prince of Wales Trophy: (Regular season champion)	Detroit Red Wings
Art Ross Trophy: (Top scorer)	Gordie Howe, Detroit Red Wings
Calder Memorial Trophy: (Best first-year player)	Bernie Geoffrion, Montreal Canadiens
Hart Trophy: (Most valuable player)	Gordie Howe, Detroit Red Wings
Lady Byng Memorial Trophy: (Excellence and sportsmanship)	Sid Smith, Toronto Maple Leafs
Vezina Trophy: (Goaltender of team with best goals-against average)	Terry Sawchuk, Detroit Red Wings

All-Star teams
First team	Position	Second team
Terry Sawchuk, Detroit Red Wings	G	Jim Henry, Boston Bruins
Red Kelly, Detroit Red Wings	D	Hy Buller, New York Rangers
Doug Harvey, Montreal Canadiens	D	Jimmy Thomson, Toronto Maple Leafs
Elmer Lach, Montreal Canadiens	C	Milt Schmidt, Boston Bruins
Gordie Howe, Detroit Red Wings	RW	Maurice Richard, Montreal Canadiens
Ted Lindsay, Detroit Red Wings	LW	Sid Smith, Toronto Maple Leafs

== Player statistics ==
=== Scoring leaders ===
Note: GP = Games played, G = Goals, A = Assists, PTS = Points, PIM = Penalties in minutes

Player	Team	GP	G	A	PTS	PIM
Gordie Howe	Detroit Red Wings	70	47	39	86	78
Ted Lindsay	Detroit Red Wings	70	30	39	69	123
Elmer Lach	Montreal Canadiens	70	15	50	65	36
Don Raleigh	New York Rangers	70	19	42	61	14
Sid Smith	Toronto Maple Leafs	70	27	30	57	6
Bernie Geoffrion	Montreal Canadiens	67	30	24	54	66
Bill Mosienko	Chicago Black Hawks	70	31	22	53	10
Sid Abel	Detroit Red Wings	62	17	36	53	32
Ted Kennedy	Toronto Maple Leafs	70	19	33	52	33
Milt Schmidt	Boston Bruins	69	21	29	50	57

Source: NHL

=== Leading goaltenders ===
Note: GP = Games played; Min = Minutes played; GA = Goals against; GAA = Goals against average; W = Wins; L = Losses; T = Ties; SO = Shutouts

Player	Team	GP	MIN	GA	GAA	W	L	T	SO
Terry Sawchuk	Detroit Red Wings	70	4200	133	1.90	44	14	12	12
Al Rollins	Toronto Maple Leafs	70	4170	154	2.22	29	24	16	5
Gerry McNeil	Montreal Canadiens	70	4200	164	2.34	34	26	10	5
Jim Henry	Boston Bruins	70	4200	176	2.51	25	29	16	7
Chuck Rayner	New York Rangers	53	3180	159	3.00	18	25	10	2
Emile Francis	New York Rangers	14	840	42	3.00	4	7	3	0

Source: NHL

== Coaches ==
- Boston Bruins: Lynn Patrick
- Chicago Black Hawks: Ebbie Goodfellow
- Detroit Red Wings: Tommy Ivan
- Montreal Canadiens: Dick Irvin
- New York Rangers: Bill Cook
- Toronto Maple Leafs: Joe Primeau

== Debuts ==
The following is a list of players of note who played their first NHL game in 1951–52 (listed with their first team, asterisk(*) marks debut in playoffs):

- Leo Labine, Boston Bruins
- Real Chevrefils, Boston Bruins
- Kenny Wharram, Chicago Black Hawks
- Don Marshall, Montreal Canadiens
- Dickie Moore, Montreal Canadiens
- Wally Hergesheimer, New York Rangers
- Eric Nesterenko, Toronto Maple Leafs
- Leo Boivin, Toronto Maple Leafs

== Last games ==
The following is a list of players of note that played their last game in the NHL in 1951–52 (listed with their last team):

- Bobby Bauer, Boston Bruins
- Roy Conacher, Chicago Black Hawks
- Jack Stewart, Chicago Black Hawks
- Bep Guidolin, Chicago Black Hawks
- Turk Broda, Toronto Maple Leafs
- Bill Juzda, Toronto Maple Leafs

== See also ==
- 1951–52 NHL transactions
- List of Stanley Cup champions
- 5th National Hockey League All-Star Game
- National Hockey League All-Star Game
- Ice hockey at the 1952 Winter Olympics
- 1951 in sports
- 1952 in sports

== Sources ==
- Diamond, Dan, ed. (1994). Years of glory, 1942–1967: the National Hockey League's official book of the six-team era. Toronto, ON: McClelland and Stewart. ISBN 0-7710-2817-2.
- Diamond, Dan, ed. (2000). Total Hockey. Total Sports. ISBN 1-892129-85-X.
- Dinger, Ralph, ed. (2011). The National Hockey League Official Guide & Record Book 2012. Toronto, ON: Dan Diamond & Associates. ISBN 978-1-894801-22-5.
- Dryden, Steve, ed. (2000). Century of hockey. Toronto, ON: McClelland & Stewart Ltd. ISBN 0-7710-4179-9.
- Fischler, Stan; Fischler, Shirley; Hughes, Morgan; Romain, Joseph; Duplacey, James (2003). The Hockey Chronicle: Year-by-Year History of the National Hockey League. Lincolnwood, Illinois: Publications International Inc. ISBN 0-7853-9624-1.
- McFarlane, Brian (1973). The Story of the National Hockey League. New York: Pagurian Press. ISBN 0-684-13424-1.
