= 1951 Stanley Cup playoffs =

NHL postseason tournament

Tournament details
- Dates: March 28 – April 21, 1951
- Teams: 4
- Defending champions: Detroit Red Wings

Final positions
- Champions: Toronto Maple Leafs
- Runners-up: Montreal Canadiens

The 1951 Stanley Cup playoffs was the playoff tournament of the National Hockey League (NHL) for the 1950–51 season. It began on March 28, 1951. It concluded on April 21, with the Toronto Maple Leafs defeating the Montreal Canadiens to win the Stanley Cup.

== Playoff seeds ==
The top four out of the six teams in the league qualified for the playoffs:

1. Detroit Red Wings – 101 points
2. Toronto Maple Leafs – 95 points
3. Montreal Canadiens – 65 points
4. Boston Bruins – 62 points

== Playoff bracket ==
In each round, teams competed in a best-of-seven series (scores in the bracket indicate the number of games won in each best-of-seven series). In the semifinals, the first-place team played the third-place team, while the second-place team played the fourth-place team. The winners of the semifinals then played for the Stanley Cup.

Semifinals
1	Detroit	2
3	Montreal	4
2	Toronto	4
4	Boston	1

Stanley Cup Finals
3	Montreal	1
2	Toronto	4

== Semifinals ==
=== (1) Detroit Red Wings vs. (3) Montreal Canadiens ===
The third seed Montreal Canadiens upset first overall Detroit Red Wings in six games.

March 27	Montreal Canadiens	3–2	4OT	Detroit Red Wings	Olympia Stadium	Recap
Butch Bouchard (1) - 13:35		First period		12:15 - Gordie Howe (1)
No scoring		Second period		No scoring
Bert Olmstead (1) - 9:08		Third period		1:10 - Leo Reise (1)
Maurice Richard (1) - 1:09		Fourth overtime period		No scoring
Gerry McNeil		Goalie stats		Terry Sawchuk

March 29	Montreal Canadiens	1–0	3OT	Detroit Red Wings	Olympia Stadium	Recap
No scoring		First period		No scoring
No scoring		Second period		No scoring
No scoring		Third period		No scoring
Maurice Richard (2) - 2:20		Third overtime period		No scoring
Gerry McNeil		Goalie stats		Terry Sawchuk

March 31	Detroit Red Wings	2–0	Montreal Canadiens	Montreal Forum	Recap
No scoring		First period	No scoring
Gordie Howe (2) - 16:23		Second period	No scoring
Sid Abel (1) - 13:45		Third period	No scoring
Terry Sawchuk		Goalie stats	Gerry McNeil

April 3	Detroit Red Wings	4–1	Montreal Canadiens	Montreal Forum	Recap
Leo Reise (2) - 8:40; Metro Prystai (1) - 10:10		First period	No scoring
No scoring		Second period	14:28 - pp - Elmer Lach (1)
Gerry Couture (1) - 10:26; Sid Abel (2) - 13:14		Third period	No scoring
Terry Sawchuk		Goalie stats	Gerry McNeil

April 5	Montreal Canadiens	5–2	Detroit Red Wings	Olympia Stadium	Recap
No scoring		First period	1:09 - Sid Abel (3); 14:27 - Gordie Howe (3)
Billy Reay (1) - sh - 4:04; Bert Olmstead (2) - pp - 11:48; Bernie Geoffrion (1) - 17:51		Second period	No scoring
Maurice Richard (3) - 14:45; Calum MacKay (1) - 18:07		Third period	No scoring
Gerry McNeil		Goalie stats	Terry Sawchuk

April 7	Detroit Red Wings	2–3	Montreal Canadiens	Montreal Forum	Recap
No scoring		First period	No scoring
No scoring		Second period	No scoring
Sid Abel (4) - 7:31; Gordie Howe (4) - 19:15		Third period	6:49 - Billy Reay (2); 9:39 - Maurice Richard (4); 15:45 - Ken Mosdell (1)
Terry Sawchuk		Goalie stats	Gerry McNeil

Montreal won series 4–2

=== (2) Toronto Maple Leafs vs. (4) Boston Bruins ===
The second seed Toronto Maple Leafs eliminated the fourth seed Boston Bruins in five games.

March 28	Boston Bruins	2-0	Toronto Maple Leafs	Maple Leaf Gardens	Recap
Lorne Ferguson (1) - 15:58		First period	No scoring
No scoring		Second period	No scoring
Woody Dumart (1) - 1:12		Third period	No scoring
Jack Gelineau		Goalie stats	Al Rollins, Turk Broda

March 31	Boston Bruins	1-1	Toronto Maple Leafs	Maple Leaf Gardens	Recap
No scoring		First period	3:47 - Bill Barilko (1)
Johnny Peirson (1) - 9:26		Second period	No scoring
No scoring		Third period	No scoring
Jack Gelineau		Goalie stats	Turk Broda

April 1	Toronto Maple Leafs	3-0	Boston Bruins	Boston Garden	Recap
No scoring		First period	No scoring
Cal Gardner (1) - 3:02; Fern Flaman (1) - pp - 13:11		Second period	No scoring
Max Bentley (1) - 5:30		Third period	No scoring
Turk Broda		Goalie stats	Jack Gelineau

April 3	Toronto Maple Leafs	3-1	Boston Bruins	Boston Garden	Recap
No scoring		First period	7:50 - Dunc Fisher (1)
Sid Smith (1) - pp - 12:17; Max Bentley (2) - 14:33		Second period	No scoring
Bill Barilko (2) - 14:08		Third period	No scoring
Turk Broda		Goalie stats	Jack Gelineau

April 7	Boston Bruins	1-4	Toronto Maple Leafs	Maple Leaf Gardens	Recap
No scoring		First period	19:38 - sh - Joe Klukay (1)
No scoring		Second period	11:12 - Fleming MacKell (1)
Bill Ezinicki (1) - 9:53		Third period	4:46 - Joe Klukay (2); 9:15 - Ted Kennedy (1)
Gord Henry		Goalie stats	Turk Broda

April 8	Toronto Maple Leafs	6-0	Boston Bruins	Boston Garden	Recap
Ted Kennedy (2) - 10:16; Joe Klukay (3) - 14:36		First period	No scoring
Fleming MacKell (2) - 12:42		Second period	No scoring
Sid Smith (2) - 6:42; Tod Sloan (1) - 9:42; Joe Klukay (4) - 15:01		Third period	No scoring
Turk Broda		Goalie stats	Gord Henry

Toronto won series 4–1–1

== Finals ==
The Stanley Cup Finals was won by the Leafs over the Canadiens, 4–1.

April 11	Montreal Canadiens	2-3	OT	Toronto Maple Leafs	Maple Leaf Gardens	Recap
Maurice Richard (5) - 15:27		First period		00:15 - Sid Smith (3); 15:42 - Tod Sloan (2)
Paul Masnick (1) - 4:02		Second period		No scoring
No scoring		Third period		No scoring
No scoring		First overtime period		5:51 - Sid Smith (4)
Gerry McNeil		Goalie stats		Turk Broda

April 14	Montreal Canadiens	3-2	OT	Toronto Maple Leafs	Maple Leaf Gardens	Recap
Paul Masnick (2) - 3:44		First period		No scoring
Billy Reay (3) - 9:24		Second period		16:31 - pp - Sid Smith (5)
No scoring		Third period		8:16 - pp - Ted Kennedy (3)
Maurice Richard (6) - 2:55		First overtime period		No scoring
Gerry McNeil		Goalie stats		Turk Broda

April 17	Toronto Maple Leafs	2-1	OT	Montreal Canadiens	Montreal Forum	Recap
No scoring		First period		2:18 - pp - Maurice Richard (7)
Sid Smith (6) - pp - 5:58		Second period		No scoring
No scoring		Third period		No scoring
Ted Kennedy (4) - 4:47		First overtime period		No scoring
Turk Broda		Goalie stats		Gerry McNeil

April 19	Toronto Maple Leafs	3-2	OT	Montreal Canadiens	Montreal Forum	Recap
Sid Smith (7) - 00:38		First period		14:41 - Maurice Richard (8)
Howie Meeker (1) - 1:27		Second period		No scoring
No scoring		Third period		13:49 - Elmer Lach (2)
Harry Watson (1) - 5:15		First overtime period		No scoring
Turk Broda		Goalie stats		Gerry McNeil

April 21	Montreal Canadiens	2-3	OT	Toronto Maple Leafs	Maple Leaf Gardens	Recap
No scoring		First period		No scoring
Maurice Richard (9) - 8:56		Second period		12:00 - Tod Sloan (3)
Paul Meger (1) - 4:47		Third period		19:28 - Tod Sloan (4)
No scoring		First overtime period		2:53 - Bill Barilko (3)
Gerry McNeil		Goalie stats		Turk Broda

Toronto won series 4–1

== Player statistics ==
=== Scoring leaders ===
Note: GP = Games played; G = Goals; A = Assists; Pts = Points

Player	Team	GP	G	A	Pts
Maurice Richard	Montreal Canadiens	11	9	4	13
Max Bentley	Toronto Maple Leafs	11	2	11	13
Sid Smith	Toronto Maple Leafs	11	7	3	10

== See also ==
- List of Stanley Cup champions

Preceded by 1950 Stanley Cup playoffs	Stanley Cup playoffs	Succeeded by 1952 Stanley Cup playoffs
