= 1951 Stanley Cup Final =

1951 ice hockey championship series

	1	2	3	4	5	Total
Toronto Maple Leafs	3*	2*	2*	3*	3*	4
Montreal Canadiens	2*	3*	1*	2*	2*	1
- * – Denotes overtime period(s)
- Location(s): Toronto: Maple Leaf Gardens (1, 2, 5); Montreal: Montreal Forum (3, 4)
- Coaches: Toronto: Joe Primeau; Montreal: Dick Irvin
- Captains: Toronto: Ted Kennedy; Montreal: Emile Bouchard
- Dates: April 11–21, 1951
- Series-winning goal: Bill Barilko (2:53, OT)
- Hall of Famers: Maple Leafs: Max Bentley (1966); Turk Broda (1967); Fernie Flaman (1990); Ted Kennedy (1966); Harry Watson (1994); Canadiens: Emile Bouchard (1966); Bernie Geoffrion (1972); Doug Harvey (1973); Tom Johnson (1970); Elmer Lach (1966); Bert Olmstead (1985); Maurice Richard (1961); Coaches: Dick Irvin (1958, player); Joe Primeau (1963, player)

The 1951 Stanley Cup Final was contested by the Toronto Maple Leafs and the Montreal Canadiens. The Maple Leafs won the series 4–1, with all five games going into overtime. It was the Toronto franchise's ninth Stanley Cup win and the last in a series of six wins starting in 1942. It was the first appearance in a string of ten consecutive appearances by the Canadiens.

== Paths to the Finals ==
Toronto defeated the Boston Bruins 4–1 to reach the Finals. Montreal defeated the defending champion Detroit Red Wings 4–2 to reach the Finals.

== Game summaries ==
For the first, and as of today, only time in NHL playoff history, every game went into overtime in this series. Bill Barilko scored the Cup-winning overtime goal, his last goal in the NHL as he would die in a plane crash during the summer.

April 11	Montreal Canadiens	2–3	OT	Toronto Maple Leafs	Maple Leaf Gardens	Recap
Maurice Richard (5) - 15:27		First period		00:15 - Sid Smith (3); 15:42 - Tod Sloan (2)
Paul Masnick (1) - 4:02		Second period		No scoring
No scoring		Third period		No scoring
No scoring		First overtime period		5:51 - Sid Smith (4)
Gerry McNeil		Goalie stats		Turk Broda

April 14	Montreal Canadiens	3–2	OT	Toronto Maple Leafs	Maple Leaf Gardens	Recap
Paul Masnick (2) - 3:44		First period		No scoring
Billy Reay (3) - 9:24		Second period		16:31 - pp - Sid Smith (5)
No scoring		Third period		8:16 - pp - Ted Kennedy (3)
Maurice Richard (6) - 2:55		First overtime period		No scoring
Gerry McNeil		Goalie stats		Turk Broda

April 17	Toronto Maple Leafs	2–1	OT	Montreal Canadiens	Montreal Forum	Recap
No scoring		First period		2:18 - pp - Maurice Richard (7)
Sid Smith (6) - pp - 5:58		Second period		No scoring
No scoring		Third period		No scoring
Ted Kennedy (4) - 4:47		First overtime period		No scoring
Al Rollins		Goalie stats		Gerry McNeil

April 19	Toronto Maple Leafs	3–2	OT	Montreal Canadiens	Montreal Forum	Recap
Sid Smith (7) - 00:38		First period		14:41 - Maurice Richard (8)
Howie Meeker (1) - 1:27		Second period		No scoring
No scoring		Third period		13:49 - Elmer Lach (2)
Harry Watson (1) - 5:15		First overtime period		No scoring
Al Rollins		Goalie stats		Gerry McNeil

April 21	Montreal Canadiens	2–3	OT	Toronto Maple Leafs	Maple Leaf Gardens	Recap
No scoring		First period		No scoring
Maurice Richard (9) - 8:56		Second period		12:00 - Tod Sloan (3)
Paul Meger (1) - 4:47		Third period		19:28 - Tod Sloan (4)
No scoring		First overtime period		2:53 - Bill Barilko (3)
Gerry McNeil		Goalie stats		Al Rollins

Toronto won series 4–1

== Stanley Cup engraving ==
The 1951 Stanley Cup was presented to Maple Leafs captain Ted Kennedy by NHL President Clarence Campbell following the Maple Leafs 3–2 overtime win over the Canadiens in game five.

The following Maple Leafs players and staff had their names engraved on the Stanley Cup

1950–51 Toronto Maple Leafs

=== Players ===
Centres

- 7 Max Bentley (A)
- 9 Ted Tedder Kennedy (Captain)
- 14 Cal Gardner
- 16 Fleming Mackell
- 20 John McCormack*
- 25 Bob Hassard †

Wingers

- 4 Harry Watson (A)
- 8 Joe Klukay
- 11 Howie Meeker
- 15 Tod Sloan
- 21 Danny Lewicki
- 22 Ray Timgren
- 24 Sid Smith

Defencemen

- 2 Jimmy Thomson
- 3 Gus Mortson
- 5 Bill Barilko
- 12 Fern Flaman
- 18 Bill Juzda
- 19 Hugh Bolton †

Goaltenders

- 1 Walter Turk Broda
- 23 Elwin Al Rollins

=== Coaching and administrative staff ===
- Conn Smythe (President/Manager/Owner), Clarence Hap Day (Asst. Manager)
- George McGillach (Vice President), John Murdoch (Vice President)
- Ed Bickle (Director/Owner), Jack Bickell (Director/Owner)
- Tim Daly (Trainer), Ed Fitkin (Publicity Director)
- Archie Campbell (Asst. Trainer), Tom Nayler (Asst. Trainer), George Walker (Chief Scout)
- Joe Primeau (Coach), William MacBrien (Chairman/Owner)
- Norman Delarue ‡, Robert Galloway ‡, Horance MacIntyre ‡ (Team Doctors)

=== Stanley Cup engraving ===
- * #20 John McCormack (C) – played in 46 regular season games. He was sent to the minors midseason. His name was still engraved on the Stanley Cup.
- † Two players who did not play in at least half of the regular season games had their names engraved on the Stanley Cup despite not officially qualifying.
  - #19 Hugh Bolton (D) – played in 13 regular season games
  - #25 Bob Hassard (C) – played in 12 regular season games
- ‡ Included on the original ring in 1951. There was no room left for the 3 team doctors the way that the Toronto Maple Leafs 1951 members were engraved on the new ring during the 1957–58 season.
- Joe Primeau was the 7th NHL rookie coach to win the Stanley Cup.
- Joe Primeau (Coach), William MacBrien (Chairman/Owner) were listed last on the Stanley Cup. Tradition has them listed before the players.

=== Engraving mistakes ===
- Several mistakes happened in the engraving of the names:
  - Gus Mortson's last name was misspelled WORTSON with a "W" instead a "M".
  - Danny Lewicki's last name was misspelled LEWESKI, with two "E"s instead of two "I"s and an "S" instead of a "C".
  - Ted Kennedy's name was misspelled KENNEDYY with an extra "Y". His position as Captain was also left off the Stanley Cup.
  - William A. H. MacBrien's last name was misspelled as McBrien, missing an "A"
  - Elwin "Al" Rollins' first name was misspelled ELVIN with a "V" instead of a "W". The Rollins mistake was not corrected on the Replica Cup created in 1992–93. The other 4 mistakes were corrected on the Replica Cup.

=== Members of Toronto Maple Leafs that won 4 cups in 5 years 1947, 1948, 1949, 1951 dynasty ===
- Bill Barilko, Turk Broda, Ted Kennedy §, Joe Klukay, Howie Meeker, Gus Mortson, Jimmy Thomson, Harry Watson (8 players),
- Ed Bickle §, John Bickell §, Conn Smythe §, John Mordoch §, William MacBrien, Hap Day §, Tim Daly §, George Walker, Ed Finkin, Horance McIntre (10 non-players).

§ also won the Stanley Cup in 1945.

== See also ==
- 1950–51 NHL season
- Canadiens–Maple Leafs rivalry

== Notes ==
Preceded by Detroit Red Wings; 1950	Toronto Maple Leafs; Stanley Cup champions 1951	Succeeded by Detroit Red Wings; 1952
