= 1950–51 Toronto Maple Leafs season =

NHL hockey team season

1950–51 Toronto Maple Leafs
- Stanley Cup champions
- League: 2nd NHL
- 1950–51 record: 41–16–13
- Home record: 22–8–5
- Road record: 19–8–8
- Goals for: 212
- Goals against: 138

Team information
- General manager: Conn Smythe
- Coach: Joe Primeau
- Captain: Ted Kennedy
- Arena: Maple Leaf Gardens

Team leaders
- Goals: Tod Sloan (31)
- Assists: Ted Kennedy (43)
- Points: Max Bentley (62)
- Penalty minutes: Gus Mortson (142)
- Wins: Al Rollins (27)
- Goals against average: Al Rollins (1.77)

The 1950–51 Toronto Maple Leafs season involved winning the Stanley Cup. The Stanley Cup was famous for Bill Barilko scoring the winning goal.

== Regular season ==
=== Final standings ===
National Hockey League
		GP	W	L	T	GF	GA	DIFF	Pts
1	Detroit Red Wings	70	44	13	13	236	139	+97	101
2	Toronto Maple Leafs	70	41	16	13	212	138	+74	95
3	Montreal Canadiens	70	25	30	15	173	184	−11	65
4	Boston Bruins	70	22	30	18	178	197	−19	62
5	New York Rangers	70	20	29	21	169	201	−32	61
6	Chicago Black Hawks	70	13	47	10	171	280	−109	36

=== Record vs. opponents ===
1950–51 NHL Records
Team	BOS	CHI	DET	MTL	NYR	TOR
Boston	—	9–4–1	2–8–4	5–6–3	4–2–8	2–10–2
Chicago	4–9–1	—	1–13	4–8–2	2–9–3	2–8–4
Detroit	8–2–4	13–1	—	8–4–2	8–3–3	7–3–4
Montreal	6–5–3	8–4–2	4–8–2	—	5–3–6	2–10–2
New York	2–4–8	9–2–3	5–7–2	3–5–6	—	3–10–1
Toronto	10–2–2	8–2–4	3–7–4	10–2–2	10–3–1	—

== Schedule and results ==
1950–51 regular season
October

Game	Result	Date	Score	Opponent	Record
1	L	October 14, 1950	1–2	Chicago Black Hawks (1950–51)	0–1–0
2	T	October 15, 1950	4–4	@ Detroit Red Wings (1950–51)	0–1–1
3	W	October 18, 1950	2–0	@ Boston Bruins (1950–51)	1–1–1
4	W	October 21, 1950	5–0	New York Rangers (1950–51)	2–1–1
5	W	October 22, 1950	5–3	@ Chicago Black Hawks (1950–51)	3–1–1
6	W	October 25, 1950	1–0	Detroit Red Wings (1950–51)	4–1–1
7	W	October 28, 1950	4–2	Boston Bruins (1950–51)	5–1–1
8	T	October 29, 1950	3–3	@ Chicago Black Hawks (1950–51)	5–1–2

November

Game	Result	Date	Score	Opponent	Record
9	W	November 1, 1950	5–3	Montreal Canadiens (1950–51)	6–1–2
10	W	November 2, 1950	2–1	@ Montreal Canadiens (1950–51)	7–1–2
11	T	November 4, 1950	2–2	New York Rangers (1950–51)	7–1–3
12	W	November 8, 1950	5–3	@ New York Rangers (1950–51)	8–1–3
13	L	November 11, 1950	1–3	Detroit Red Wings (1950–51)	8–2–3
14	W	November 12, 1950	7–0	@ Boston Bruins (1950–51)	9–2–3
15	L	November 16, 1950	2–5	@ Montreal Canadiens (1950–51)	9–3–3
16	W	November 18, 1950	5–4	New York Rangers (1950–51)	10–3–3
17	L	November 19, 1950	1–3	@ Boston Bruins (1950–51)	10–4–3
18	W	November 22, 1950	5–2	Chicago Black Hawks (1950–51)	11–4–3
19	W	November 23, 1950	2–1	@ Detroit Red Wings (1950–51)	12–4–3
20	W	November 25, 1950	4–1	Montreal Canadiens (1950–51)	13–4–3
21	W	November 26, 1950	3–2	@ New York Rangers (1950–51)	14–4–3
22	T	November 30, 1950	0–0	@ Montreal Canadiens (1950–51)	14–4–4

December

Game	Result	Date	Score	Opponent	Record
23	T	December 2, 1950	0–0	Chicago Black Hawks (1950–51)	14–4–5
24	T	December 3, 1950	3–3	@ Chicago Black Hawks (1950–51)	14–4–6
25	W	December 6, 1950	3–1	Montreal Canadiens (1950–51)	15–4–6
26	W	December 9, 1950	8–1	Boston Bruins (1950–51)	16–4–6
27	L	December 10, 1950	2–3	@ Detroit Red Wings (1950–51)	16–5–6
28	L	December 13, 1950	3–4	Detroit Red Wings (1950–51)	16–6–6
29	W	December 14, 1950	7–1	@ Chicago Black Hawks (1950–51)	17–6–6
30	L	December 16, 1950	2–3	Chicago Black Hawks (1950–51)	17–7–6
31	W	December 17, 1950	4–2	@ Boston Bruins (1950–51)	18–7–6
32	W	December 20, 1950	6–1	Montreal Canadiens (1950–51)	19–7–6
33	T	December 23, 1950	2–2	Boston Bruins (1950–51)	19–7–7
34	L	December 27, 1950	1–3	@ New York Rangers (1950–51)	19–8–7
35	L	December 30, 1950	1–3	Detroit Red Wings (1950–51)	19–9–7
36	W	December 31, 1950	4–2	@ Detroit Red Wings (1950–51)	20–9–7

January

Game	Result	Date	Score	Opponent	Record
37	L	January 6, 1951	2–4	New York Rangers (1950–51)	20–10–7
38	T	January 9, 1951	3–3	@ Detroit Red Wings (1950–51)	20–10–8
39	T	January 13, 1951	3–3	Chicago Black Hawks (1950–51)	20–10–9
40	L	January 14, 1951	1–2	@ New York Rangers (1950–51)	20–11–9
41	W	January 18, 1951	5–2	@ Montreal Canadiens (1950–51)	21–11–9
42	W	January 20, 1951	2–1	Boston Bruins (1950–51)	22–11–9
43	T	January 21, 1951	0–0	@ Detroit Red Wings (1950–51)	22–11–10
44	W	January 24, 1951	4–3	Montreal Canadiens (1950–51)	23–11–10
45	W	January 27, 1951	2–1	New York Rangers (1950–51)	24–11–10
46	W	January 28, 1951	4–3	@ Chicago Black Hawks (1950–51)	25–11–10

February

Game	Result	Date	Score	Opponent	Record
47	W	February 1, 1951	3–1	@ Montreal Canadiens (1950–51)	26–11–10
48	W	February 3, 1951	6–3	Chicago Black Hawks (1950–51)	27–11–10
49	T	February 4, 1951	3–3	@ Boston Bruins (1950–51)	27–11–11
50	W	February 7, 1951	3–1	Montreal Canadiens (1950–51)	28–11–11
51	L	February 10, 1951	1–2	Detroit Red Wings (1950–51)	28–12–11
52	W	February 11, 1951	5–3	@ Chicago Black Hawks (1950–51)	29–12–11
53	T	February 15, 1951	2–2	@ Montreal Canadiens (1950–51)	29–12–12
54	W	February 17, 1951	2–0	New York Rangers (1950–51)	30–12–12
55	W	February 18, 1951	5–2	@ New York Rangers (1950–51)	31–12–12
56	T	February 21, 1951	2–2	Detroit Red Wings (1950–51)	31–12–13
57	W	February 24, 1951	6–2	Boston Bruins (1950–51)	32–12–13

March

Game	Result	Date	Score	Opponent	Record
58	L	March 1, 1951	1–3	@ Montreal Canadiens (1950–51)	32–13–13
59	W	March 3, 1951	3–0	Chicago Black Hawks (1950–51)	33–13–13
60	L	March 5, 1951	1–3	@ Detroit Red Wings (1950–51)	33–14–13
61	L	March 7, 1951	0–3	Detroit Red Wings (1950–51)	33–15–13
62	W	March 10, 1951	5–3	Boston Bruins (1950–51)	34–15–13
63	L	March 11, 1951	1–3	@ Boston Bruins (1950–51)	34–16–13
64	W	March 14, 1951	3–1	@ New York Rangers (1950–51)	35–16–13
65	W	March 15, 1951	5–3	@ Chicago Black Hawks (1950–51)	36–16–13
66	W	March 17, 1951	3–1	New York Rangers (1950–51)	37–16–13
67	W	March 18, 1951	4–1	@ New York Rangers (1950–51)	38–16–13
68	W	March 21, 1951	2–0	Montreal Canadiens (1950–51)	39–16–13
69	W	March 24, 1951	4–1	Boston Bruins (1950–51)	40–16–13
70	W	March 25, 1951	1–0	@ Boston Bruins (1950–51)	41–16–13

Legend: Win (2 points) Loss (0 points) Tie (1 point)

== Player statistics ==
=== Regular season ===
Scoring

Player	GP	G	A	Pts	PIM
Max Bentley	67	21	41	62	34
Ted Kennedy	63	18	43	61	32
Tod Sloan	70	31	25	56	105
Sid Smith	70	30	21	51	10
Cal Gardner	66	23	28	51	42
Harry Watson	68	18	19	37	18
Jimmy Thomson	69	3	33	36	76
Danny Lewicki	61	16	18	34	26
Joe Klukay	70	14	16	30	16
Fleming MacKell	70	12	13	25	40
Howie Meeker	49	6	14	20	24
John McCormack	46	6	7	13	2
Gus Mortson	60	3	10	13	142
Bill Barilko	58	6	6	12	96
Ray Timgren	70	1	9	10	20
Bill Juzda	65	0	9	9	64
Fern Flaman	39	2	6	8	64
Hugh Bolton	13	1	3	4	4
Phil Maloney	1	1	0	1	0
Bob Hassard	12	0	1	1	0
Andy Barbe	1	0	0	0	2
Dusty Blair	2	0	0	0	0
Turk Broda	31	0	0	0	4
Bob Copp	2	0	0	0	2
Al Rollins	40	0	0	0	0

Goaltending

Player	MIN	GP	W	L	T	GA	GAA	SA	SV	SV%	SO
Al Rollins	2373	40	27	5	8	70	1.77				5
Turk Broda	1827	31	14	11	5	68	2.23				6
Team:	4200	70	41	16	13	138	1.97				11

=== Playoffs ===
Scoring

Player	GP	G	A	Pts	PIM
Max Bentley	11	2	11	13	4
Sid Smith	11	7	3	10	0
Ted Kennedy	11	4	5	9	6
Tod Sloan	11	4	5	9	18
Joe Klukay	11	4	3	7	0
Bill Barilko	11	3	2	5	31
Fleming MacKell	11	2	3	5	9
Harry Watson	5	1	2	3	4
Cal Gardner	11	1	1	2	4
Howie Meeker	11	1	1	2	14
Fern Flaman	9	1	0	1	8
Gus Mortson	11	0	1	1	4
Jimmy Thomson	11	0	1	1	34
Ray Timgren	11	0	1	1	2
Turk Broda	8	0	0	0	0
Bill Juzda	11	0	0	0	7
Danny Lewicki	9	0	0	0	0
Al Rollins	4	0	0	0	0

Goaltending

Player	MIN	GP	W	L	T	GA	GAA	SA	SV	SV%	SO
Turk Broda	492	8	5	1		9	1.10				2
Al Rollins	210	4	3	1		6	1.71				0
Team:	702	10	8	2		15	1.28				2

== Playoffs ==
=== Stanley Cup Finals ===
Every game went into overtime in this series. Bill Barilko scored the Cup-winning goal, his last goal in the NHL as he would die in a plane crash during the summer.

Toronto Maple Leafs vs. Montreal Canadiens

Date	Away	Score	Home	Score	Notes
April 11	Montreal	2	Toronto	3	OT
April 14	Montreal	3	Toronto	2	OT
April 17	Toronto	2	Montreal	1	OT
April 19	Toronto	3	Montreal	2	OT
April 21	Montreal	2	Toronto	3	OT

Toronto wins best-of-seven series four games to one.
