= 1950–51 Boston Bruins season =

NHL team season

1950–51 Boston Bruins
- League: 4th NHL
- 1950–51 record: 22–30–18
- Home record: 13–12–10
- Road record: 9–18–8
- Goals for: 178
- Goals against: 197

Team information
- General manager: Art Ross
- Coach: Lynn Patrick
- Captain: Milt Schmidt
- Arena: Boston Garden

Team leaders
- Goals: Milt Schmidt (22)
- Assists: Milt Schmidt (39)
- Points: Milt Schmidt (61)
- Penalty minutes: Bill Ezinicki (119)
- Wins: Jack Gelineau (22)
- Goals against average: Jack Gelineau (2.81)

The 1950–51 Boston Bruins season was the Bruins' 27th season in the NHL.

== Regular season ==
=== Final standings ===
National Hockey League
		GP	W	L	T	GF	GA	DIFF	Pts
1	Detroit Red Wings	70	44	13	13	236	139	+97	101
2	Toronto Maple Leafs	70	41	16	13	212	138	+74	95
3	Montreal Canadiens	70	25	30	15	173	184	−11	65
4	Boston Bruins	70	22	30	18	178	197	−19	62
5	New York Rangers	70	20	29	21	169	201	−32	61
6	Chicago Black Hawks	70	13	47	10	171	280	−109	36

=== Record vs. opponents ===
1950–51 NHL Records
Team	BOS	CHI	DET	MTL	NYR	TOR
Boston	—	9–4–1	2–8–4	5–6–3	4–2–8	2–10–2
Chicago	4–9–1	—	1–13	4–8–2	2–9–3	2–8–4
Detroit	8–2–4	13–1	—	8–4–2	8–3–3	7–3–4
Montreal	6–5–3	8–4–2	4–8–2	—	5–3–6	2–10–2
New York	2–4–8	9–2–3	5–7–2	3–5–6	—	3–10–1
Toronto	10–2–2	8–2–4	3–7–4	10–2–2	10–3–1	—

== Schedule and results ==
1950–51 regular season
October

Game	Result	Date	Score	Opponent	Record
1	T	October 14, 1950	1–1	@ Montreal Canadiens (1950–51)	0–0–1
2	L	October 15, 1950	1–2	Montreal Canadiens (1950–51)	0–1–1
3	L	October 18, 1950	0–2	Toronto Maple Leafs (1950–51)	0–2–1
4	T	October 22, 1950	0–0	New York Rangers (1950–51)	0–2–2
5	T	October 25, 1950	1–1	@ New York Rangers (1950–51)	0–2–3
6	L	October 28, 1950	2–4	@ Toronto Maple Leafs (1950–51)	0–3–3
7	L	October 29, 1950	0–2	@ Detroit Red Wings (1950–51)	0–4–3

November

Game	Result	Date	Score	Opponent	Record
8	L	November 2, 1950	2–5	@ Chicago Black Hawks (1950–51)	0–5–3
9	W	November 4, 1950	3–2	@ Montreal Canadiens (1950–51)	1–5–3
10	L	November 5, 1950	2–4	@ Detroit Red Wings (1950–51)	1–6–3
11	T	November 8, 1950	3–3	Detroit Red Wings (1950–51)	1–6–4
12	L	November 11, 1950	2–4	Chicago Black Hawks (1950–51)	1–7–4
13	L	November 12, 1950	0–7	Toronto Maple Leafs (1950–51)	1–8–4
14	W	November 15, 1950	4–3	@ New York Rangers (1950–51)	2–8–4
15	L	November 18, 1950	1–2	Detroit Red Wings (1950–51)	2–9–4
16	W	November 19, 1950	3–1	Toronto Maple Leafs (1950–51)	3–9–4
17	L	November 23, 1950	1–4	@ Chicago Black Hawks (1950–51)	3–10–4
18	T	November 25, 1950	3–3	New York Rangers (1950–51)	3–10–5
19	L	November 26, 1950	1–3	Montreal Canadiens (1950–51)	3–11–5
20	W	November 29, 1950	6–3	Detroit Red Wings (1950–51)	4–11–5

December

Game	Result	Date	Score	Opponent	Record
21	L	December 2, 1950	2–3	New York Rangers (1950–51)	4–12–5
22	W	December 3, 1950	5–3	@ New York Rangers (1950–51)	5–12–5
23	W	December 6, 1950	5–4	Chicago Black Hawks (1950–51)	6–12–5
24	W	December 7, 1950	3–0	@ Montreal Canadiens (1950–51)	7–12–5
25	L	December 9, 1950	1–8	@ Toronto Maple Leafs (1950–51)	7–13–5
26	W	December 10, 1950	5–2	Montreal Canadiens (1950–51)	8–13–5
27	L	December 14, 1950	2–4	@ Detroit Red Wings (1950–51)	8–14–5
28	L	December 16, 1950	1–4	Detroit Red Wings (1950–51)	8–15–5
29	L	December 17, 1950	2–4	Toronto Maple Leafs (1950–51)	8–16–5
30	T	December 20, 1950	4–4	@ New York Rangers (1950–51)	8–16–6
31	W	December 21, 1950	3–1	@ Chicago Black Hawks (1950–51)	9–16–6
32	T	December 23, 1950	2–2	@ Toronto Maple Leafs (1950–51)	9–16–7
33	W	December 25, 1950	7–4	Chicago Black Hawks (1950–51)	10–16–7
34	T	December 27, 1950	4–4	Chicago Black Hawks (1950–51)	10–16–8
35	L	December 31, 1950	0–3	@ New York Rangers (1950–51)	10–17–8

January

Game	Result	Date	Score	Opponent	Record
36	W	January 1, 1951	3–2	New York Rangers (1950–51)	11–17–8
37	W	January 4, 1951	4–2	@ Montreal Canadiens (1950–51)	12–17–8
38	L	January 7, 1951	0–3	@ Detroit Red Wings (1950–51)	12–18–8
39	W	January 9, 1951	5–4	@ Chicago Black Hawks (1950–51)	13–18–8
40	L	January 13, 1951	0–4	@ Montreal Canadiens (1950–51)	13–19–8
41	W	January 14, 1951	5–1	Chicago Black Hawks (1950–51)	14–19–8
42	T	January 17, 1951	3–3	@ New York Rangers (1950–51)	14–19–9
43	L	January 20, 1951	1–2	@ Toronto Maple Leafs (1950–51)	14–20–9
44	W	January 21, 1951	5–1	New York Rangers (1950–51)	15–20–9
45	T	January 25, 1951	3–3	@ Detroit Red Wings (1950–51)	15–20–10
46	W	January 27, 1951	3–0	Detroit Red Wings (1950–51)	16–20–10
47	T	January 28, 1951	1–1	Montreal Canadiens (1950–51)	16–20–11

February

Game	Result	Date	Score	Opponent	Record
48	L	February 1, 1951	2–5	@ Chicago Black Hawks (1950–51)	16–21–11
49	L	February 3, 1951	1–4	@ Montreal Canadiens (1950–51)	16–22–11
50	T	February 4, 1951	3–3	Toronto Maple Leafs (1950–51)	16–22–12
51	T	February 7, 1951	2–2	New York Rangers (1950–51)	16–22–13
52	W	February 10, 1951	6–0	Montreal Canadiens (1950–51)	17–22–13
53	L	February 11, 1951	1–2	Detroit Red Wings (1950–51)	17–23–13
54	W	February 18, 1951	7–3	@ Chicago Black Hawks (1950–51)	18–23–13
55	T	February 19, 1951	2–2	@ Detroit Red Wings (1950–51)	18–23–14
56	T	February 21, 1951	2–2	@ New York Rangers (1950–51)	18–23–15
57	L	February 24, 1951	2–6	@ Toronto Maple Leafs (1950–51)	18–24–15
58	W	February 25, 1951	3–2	@ Chicago Black Hawks (1950–51)	19–24–15
59	T	February 28, 1951	1–1	Detroit Red Wings (1950–51)	19–24–16

March

Game	Result	Date	Score	Opponent	Record
60	T	March 3, 1951	3–3	New York Rangers (1950–51)	19–24–17
61	W	March 4, 1951	10–2	Chicago Black Hawks (1950–51)	20–24–17
62	L	March 7, 1951	2–3	Montreal Canadiens (1950–51)	20–25–17
63	L	March 10, 1951	3–5	@ Toronto Maple Leafs (1950–51)	20–26–17
64	W	March 11, 1951	3–1	Toronto Maple Leafs (1950–51)	21–26–17
65	L	March 15, 1951	0–4	@ Detroit Red Wings (1950–51)	21–27–17
66	L	March 17, 1951	1–3	@ Montreal Canadiens (1950–51)	21–28–17
67	T	March 18, 1951	2–2	Montreal Canadiens (1950–51)	21–28–18
68	W	March 21, 1951	6–5	Chicago Black Hawks (1950–51)	22–28–18
69	L	March 24, 1951	1–4	@ Toronto Maple Leafs (1950–51)	22–29–18
70	L	March 25, 1951	0–1	Toronto Maple Leafs (1950–51)	22–30–18

Legend: Win (2 points) Loss (0 points) Tie (1 point)

== Player statistics ==
=== Regular season ===
Scoring

Player	Pos	GP	G	A	Pts	PIM
Milt Schmidt	C/D	62	22	39	61	33
Woody Dumart	LW	70	20	21	41	7
Johnny Peirson	RW	70	19	19	38	43
Bill Ezinicki	RW	53	16	19	35	119
Lorne Ferguson	LW	70	16	17	33	31
Paul Ronty	C	70	10	22	32	20
Dunc Fisher	RW	53	9	20	29	20
Bill Quackenbush	D	70	5	24	29	12
Pete Horeck	LW	66	10	13	23	57
Ed Sandford	LW	51	10	13	23	33
Vic Lynn	LW/D	56	14	6	20	69
Murray Henderson	D	66	4	7	11	37
Max Quackenbush	D	47	4	6	10	26
Dave Creighton	C	56	5	4	9	4
Ed Kryzanowski	D	69	3	6	9	10
Ross Lowe	D/LW	43	5	3	8	40
Ken Smith	LW	14	1	3	4	11
Phil Maloney	C	13	2	0	2	2
Fern Flaman	D	14	1	1	2	37
Hal Laycoe	D	6	1	1	2	4
Ed Reigle	D	17	0	2	2	25
Ed Harrison	C/LW	9	1	0	1	0
Zellio Toppazzini	RW	4	0	1	1	0
Bob Armstrong	D	2	0	0	0	2
Jack Gelineau	G	70	0	0	0	4
Stephen Kraftcheck	D	22	0	0	0	8

Goaltending

Player	MIN	GP	W	L	T	GA	GAA	SO
Jack Gelineau	4200	70	22	30	18	197	2.81	4
Team:	4200	70	22	30	18	197	2.81	4

=== Playoffs ===
Scoring

Player	Pos	GP	G	A	Pts	PIM
Woody Dumart	LW	6	1	2	3	0
Bill Ezinicki	RW	6	1	1	2	18
Johnny Peirson	RW	2	1	1	2	2
Lorne Ferguson	LW	6	1	0	1	2
Dunc Fisher	RW	6	1	0	1	0
Dave Creighton	C	5	0	1	1	0
Hal Laycoe	D	6	0	1	1	5
Bill Quackenbush	D	6	0	1	1	0
Paul Ronty	C	6	0	1	1	2
Ed Sandford	LW	6	0	1	1	4
Milt Schmidt	C/D	6	0	1	1	7
Jack Gelineau	G	4	0	0	0	0
Murray Henderson	D	5	0	0	0	2
Gord Henry	G	2	0	0	0	0
Pete Horeck	LW	4	0	0	0	13
Stephen Kraftcheck	D	6	0	0	0	7
Ed Kryzanowski	D	6	0	0	0	2
Vic Lynn	LW/D	5	0	0	0	2
Jack McIntyre	D	2	0	0	0	0
Max Quackenbush	D	6	0	0	0	4
Red Sullivan	C	2	0	0	0	2

Goaltending

Player	MIN	GP	W	L	GA	GAA	SO
Jack Gelineau	260	4	1	2	7	1.62	1
Gord Henry	120	2	0	2	10	5.00	0
Team:	380	5	1	4	17	2.68	1

Note:

Pos = Position;GP = Games played; G = Goals; A = Assists; Pts = Points; PIM = Penalty minutes; +/- = Plus/minus; PPG = Power-play goals; SHG = Short-handed goals; GWG = Game-winning goals
Pos = Position;GP = Games played; Min, TOI = Minutes played; W = Wins; L = Losses; T,T/OT = Ties; OTL = Overtime losses; GA = Goals-against; GAA = Goals-against average; SO = Shutouts; SA = Shots against; SV = Shots saved;SV% = Save percentage;

== See also ==
- 1950–51 NHL season
