= 1950–51 New York Rangers season =

NHL hockey team season

1950–51 New York Rangers
- League: 5th NHL
- 1950–51 record: 20–29–21
- Home record: 14–11–10
- Road record: 6–18–11
- Goals for: 169
- Goals against: 201

Team information
- General manager: Frank Boucher
- Coach: Neil Colville
- Captain: Frank Eddolls
- Arena: Madison Square Garden

Team leaders
- Goals: Nick Mickoski (20)
- Assists: Don Raleigh (24)
- Points: Don Raleigh/Reg Sinclair (39)
- Penalty minutes: Tony Leswick (112)
- Wins: Chuck Rayner (19)
- Goals against average: Chuck Raynor (2.85)

The 1950–51 New York Rangers season was the franchise's 25th season. The Rangers finished with a 20–29–21 record in the regular season. They ended the season in fifth place with 61 points, and did not make the NHL playoffs for the first time since the 1948–49 season.

== Regular season ==
=== Final standings ===
National Hockey League
		GP	W	L	T	GF	GA	DIFF	Pts
1	Detroit Red Wings	70	44	13	13	236	139	+97	101
2	Toronto Maple Leafs	70	41	16	13	212	138	+74	95
3	Montreal Canadiens	70	25	30	15	173	184	−11	65
4	Boston Bruins	70	22	30	18	178	197	−19	62
5	New York Rangers	70	20	29	21	169	201	−32	61
6	Chicago Black Hawks	70	13	47	10	171	280	−109	36

=== Record vs. opponents ===
1950–51 NHL Records
Team	BOS	CHI	DET	MTL	NYR	TOR
Boston	—	9–4–1	2–8–4	5–6–3	4–2–8	2–10–2
Chicago	4–9–1	—	1–13	4–8–2	2–9–3	2–8–4
Detroit	8–2–4	13–1	—	8–4–2	8–3–3	7–3–4
Montreal	6–5–3	8–4–2	4–8–2	—	5–3–6	2–10–2
New York	2–4–8	9–2–3	5–7–2	3–5–6	—	3–10–1
Toronto	10–2–2	8–2–4	3–7–4	10–2–2	10–3–1	—

== Schedule and results ==
1950–51 regular season
October: 1–4–3 (home: 0–0–2; road: 1–4–1)

Game	October	Opponent	Score	Record
1	11	@ Detroit Red Wings	3–2	0–1–0
2	15	@ Chicago Black Hawks	3–2	1–1–0
3	19	@ Montreal Canadiens	4–0	1–2–0
4	21	@ Toronto Maple Leafs	5–0	1–3–0
5	22	@ Boston Bruins	0–0	1–3–1
6	25	Boston Bruins	1–1	1–3–2
7	28	@ Montreal Canadiens	5–1	1–4–2
8	29	Montreal Canadiens	2–2	1–4–3

November: 1–6–6 (home: 1–4–2; road: 0–2–4)

Game	November	Opponent	Score	Record
9	2	@ Detroit Red Wings	2–2	1–4–4
10	4	@ Toronto Maple Leafs	2–2	1–4–5
11	5	@ Chicago Black Hawks	3–1	1–5–5
12	8	Toronto Maple Leafs	5–3	1–6–5
13	11	@ Montreal Canadiens	1–1	1–6–6
14	12	Chicago Black Hawks	4–1	1–7–6
15	15	Boston Bruins	4–3	1–8–6
16	18	@ Toronto Maple Leafs	5–4	1–9–6
17	19	Detroit Red Wings	3–3	1–9–7
18	22	Montreal Canadiens	3–2	2–9–7
19	25	@ Boston Bruins	3–3	2–9–8
20	26	Toronto Maple Leafs	3–2	2–10–8
21	29	Chicago Black Hawks	1–1	2–10–9

December: 5–4–4 (home: 4–2–2; road: 1–2–2)

Game	December	Opponent	Score	Record
22	2	@ Boston Bruins	3–2	3–10–9
23	3	Boston Bruins	5–3	3–11–9
24	6	Detroit Red Wings	9–0	3–12–9
25	9	@ Detroit Red Wings	5–0	3–13–9
26	10	@ Chicago Black Hawks	3–3	3–13–10
27	13	Montreal Canadiens	3–2	4–13–10
28	16	@ Montreal Canadiens	1–1	4–13–11
29	17	Detroit Red Wings	3–3	4–13–12
30	20	Boston Bruins	4–4	4–13–13
31	24	Chicago Black Hawks	6–1	5–13–13
32	25	@ Detroit Red Wings	4–1	5–14–13
33	27	Toronto Maple Leafs	3–1	6–14–13
34	31	Boston Bruins	3–0	7–14–13

January: 6–5–2 (home: 4–1–1; road: 2–4–1)

Game	January	Opponent	Score	Record
35	1	@ Boston Bruins	3–2	7–15–13
36	3	Detroit Red Wings	5–3	8–15–13
37	6	@ Toronto Maple Leafs	4–2	9–15–13
38	7	Chicago Black Hawks	3–2	10–15–13
39	10	Montreal Canadiens	3–0	10–16–13
40	13	@ Detroit Red Wings	4–2	10–17–13
41	14	Toronto Maple Leafs	2–1	11–17–13
42	17	Boston Bruins	3–3	11–17–14
43	20	@ Montreal Canadiens	2–2	11–17–15
44	21	@ Boston Bruins	5–1	11–18–15
45	25	@ Chicago Black Hawks	2–1	12–18–15
46	27	@ Toronto Maple Leafs	2–1	12–19–15
47	28	Detroit Red Wings	5–3	13–19–15

February: 4–4–3 (home: 3–1–1; road: 1–3–2)

Game	February	Opponent	Score	Record
48	1	@ Detroit Red Wings	3–2	13–20–15
49	4	@ Chicago Black Hawks	4–4	13–20–16
50	7	@ Boston Bruins	2–2	13–20–17
51	11	Montreal Canadiens	3–1	14–20–17
52	14	Chicago Black Hawks	5–1	15–20–17
53	15	@ Chicago Black Hawks	7–3	16–20–17
54	17	@ Toronto Maple Leafs	2–0	16–21–17
55	18	Toronto Maple Leafs	5–2	16–22–17
56	21	Boston Bruins	2–2	16–22–18
57	24	@ Montreal Canadiens	6–2	16–23–18
58	25	Detroit Red Wings	6–2	17–23–18

March: 3–6–3 (home: 2–3–2; road: 1–3–1)

Game	March	Opponent	Score	Record
59	1	@ Chicago Black Hawks	4–1	18–23–18
60	3	@ Boston Bruins	3–3	18–23–19
61	4	Montreal Canadiens	2–2	18–23–20
62	7	Chicago Black Hawks	3–1	19–23–20
63	10	@ Detroit Red Wings	3–2	19–24–20
64	11	Montreal Canadiens	5–5	19–24–21
65	14	Toronto Maple Leafs	3–1	19–25–21
66	15	@ Montreal Canadiens	5–3	19–26–21
67	17	@ Toronto Maple Leafs	3–1	19–27–21
68	18	Toronto Maple Leafs	4–1	19–28–21
69	21	Detroit Red Wings	4–1	19–29–21
70	25	Chicago Black Hawks	5–2	20–29–21

Legend: Win (2 points) Loss (0 points) Tie (1 point)

== Player statistics ==
Skaters

Regular season
Player	GP	G	A	Pts	PIM
Reggie Sinclair	70	18	21	39	70
Don Raleigh	64	15	24	39	18
Herbert O'Connor	66	16	20	36	0
Nick Mickoski	64	20	15	35	12
Ed Slowinski	69	14	18	32	15
Ed Kullman	70	14	18	32	88
Zellio Toppazzini^{†}	55	14	13	27	27
Tony Leswick	70	15	11	26	112
Edgar Laprade	42	10	13	23	0
Allan Stanley	70	7	14	21	75
Pentti Lund	59	4	16	20	6
Jackie McLeod	41	5	10	15	2
Pat Egan	70	5	10	15	70
Frank Eddolls	68	3	8	11	24
Alex Kaleta	58	3	4	7	26
Wally Stanowski	49	1	5	6	28
Walter Kyle	64	2	3	5	92
Bill Kyle	1	0	3	3	0
Vic Howe	3	1	0	1	0
Ed Harrison^{†}	4	1	0	1	2
Jack Evans	49	1	0	1	95
Jack Gordon	4	0	1	1	0
Jack Lancien	19	0	1	1	8
Dick Kotanen	1	0	0	0	0
Bill Wylie	1	0	0	0	0
Bob Wood	1	0	0	0	0
Dunc Fisher^{‡}	8	0	0	0	0

Goaltenders

Regular season
Player	GP	TOI	W	L	T	GA	GAA	SO
Chuck Rayner	66	3940	19	28	19	187	2.85	2
Emile Francis	5	260	1	1	2	14	3.23	0

^{†}Denotes player spent time with another team before joining Rangers. Stats reflect time with Rangers only.
^{‡}Traded mid-season. Stats reflect time with Rangers only.

Note:

Pos = Position;GP = Games played; G = Goals; A = Assists; Pts = Points; PIM = Penalty minutes; +/- = Plus/minus; PPG = Power-play goals; SHG = Short-handed goals; GWG = Game-winning goals
Pos = Position;GP = Games played; Min, TOI = Minutes played; W = Wins; L = Losses; T,T/OT = Ties; OTL = Overtime losses; GA = Goals-against; GAA = Goals-against average; SO = Shutouts; SA = Shots against; SV = Shots saved;SV% = Save percentage;

== See also ==
- 1950–51 NHL season
