= 1950–51 Chicago Black Hawks season =

NHL ice hockey team season

1950–51 Chicago Black Hawks
- League: 6th NHL
- 1950–51 record: 13–47–10
- Home record: 8–22–5
- Road record: 5–25–5
- Goals for: 171
- Goals against: 280

Team information
- General manager: Bill Tobin
- Coach: Ebbie Goodfellow
- Captain: Jack Stewart
- Arena: Chicago Stadium

Team leaders
- Goals: Roy Conacher (26)
- Assists: Jim Conacher (27)
- Points: Roy Conacher (50)
- Penalty minutes: Al Dewsbury (79)
- Wins: Harry Lumley (12)
- Goals against average: Harry Lumley (3.90)

The 1950–51 Chicago Black Hawks season was the team's 25th season in the NHL, and they were coming off of a last place finish in 1949–50, as the Hawks had a record of 22–38–10, earning 54 points, and failing to qualify for the post-season for the fourth season in a row. In 1950–51, the Black Hawks would have one of the worst seasons in their history, winning only 13 games.

== Off-season ==
In the off-season, the Black Hawks and Detroit Red Wings made the biggest trade in NHL history at the time, as Chicago sent Jim Henry, Gaye Stewart, Bob Goldham and Metro Prystai to Detroit for Harry Lumley, Jack Stewart, Al Dewsbury, Don Morrison and Pete Babando. The club also replaced head coach Charlie Conacher with former Red Wings player Ebbie Goodfellow, and named the newly acquired Jack Stewart the captain of the team.

== Regular season ==
Chicago started the season off playing very good hockey, as they went a solid 7–3–2 in their opening 12 games. The Black Hawks then fell into a slump, however, 27 games into the season, they were still playing over .500 hockey, as their record was 11–10–6, and fighting with the New York Rangers, Boston Bruins and Montreal Canadiens for a playoff spot. Chicago then ran into injuries, as team captain Jack Stewart ruptured a disc in his back, ending his season after only 26 games, while Gus Bodnar and Bill Gadsby would also run into severe injury problems, as the Black Hawks would go on to a 2–37–4 record in their last 43 games, finishing in last place for the second consecutive season. The 36 points the Hawks earned was the lowest total since 1944–45, when the team earned 33, however, they played 20 less games that season.

Offensively, Chicago was led by Roy Conacher, who notched a team high 26 goals and 50 points, while Jim Conacher recorded a team high 27 assists, and finished tied with Pete Babando in second place on the team scoring list with 37 points. Bill Mosienko would join Roy Conacher as the only Hawks to record over 20 goals, as he registered 21 goals. Al Dewsbury led the blueline with 5 goals and 19 points, and had a club high 79 penalty minutes.

In goal, newly acquired Harry Lumley played the majority of the games, winning a team high 12 games while posting a team best 3.90 GAA, while earning three shutouts along the way.

=== Season standings ===
National Hockey League
		GP	W	L	T	GF	GA	DIFF	Pts
**1**	**Detroit Red Wings**	**70**	**44**	**13**	**13**	**236**	**139**	**+97**	**101**
**2**	**Toronto Maple Leafs**	**70**	**41**	**16**	**13**	**212**	**138**	**+74**	**95**
**3**	**Montreal Canadiens**	**70**	**25**	**30**	**15**	**173**	**184**	**−11**	**65**
**4**	**Boston Bruins**	**70**	**22**	**30**	**18**	**178**	**197**	**−19**	**62**
5	New York Rangers	70	20	29	21	169	201	−32	61
6	Chicago Black Hawks	70	13	47	10	171	280	−109	36

Teams in bold qualified for the playoffs.

=== Record vs. opponents ===
1950–51 NHL Records
Team	BOS	CHI	DET	MTL	NYR	TOR
Boston	—	9–4–1	2–8–4	5–6–3	4–2–8	2–10–2
Chicago	4–9–1	—	1–13	4–8–2	2–9–3	2–8–4
Detroit	8–2–4	13–1	—	8–4–2	8–3–3	7–3–4
Montreal	6–5–3	8–4–2	4–8–2	—	5–3–6	2–10–2
New York	2–4–8	9–2–3	5–7–2	3–5–6	—	3–10–1
Toronto	10–2–2	8–2–4	3–7–4	10–2–2	10–3–1	—

== Schedule and results ==
1950–51 regular season
October

Game	Date	Visitor	Score	Home	Record	Points
1	October 12	Chicago Black Hawks	3–3	Montreal Canadiens	0–0–1	1
2	October 14	Chicago Black Hawks	2–1	Toronto Maple Leafs	1–0–1	3
3	October 15	New York Rangers	3–2	Chicago Black Hawks	1–1–1	3
4	October 22	Toronto Maple Leafs	5–3	Chicago Black Hawks	1–2–1	3
5	October 26	Montreal Canadiens	1–5	Chicago Black Hawks	2–2–1	5
6	October 28	Chicago Black Hawks	1–3	Detroit Red Wings	2–3–1	5
7	October 29	Toronto Maple Leafs	3–3	Chicago Black Hawks	2–3–2	6

November

Game	Date	Visitor	Score	Home	Record	Points
8	November 2	Boston Bruins	2–5	Chicago Black Hawks	3–3–2	8
9	November 5	New York Rangers	1–3	Chicago Black Hawks	4–3–2	10
10	November 9	Montreal Canadiens	1–2	Chicago Black Hawks	5–3–2	12
11	November 11	Chicago Black Hawks	4–2	Boston Bruins	6–3–2	14
12	November 12	Chicago Black Hawks	4–1	New York Rangers	7–3–2	16
13	November 16	Detroit Red Wings	5–1	Chicago Black Hawks	7–4–2	16
14	November 18	Chicago Black Hawks	2–3	Montreal Canadiens	7–5–2	16
15	November 19	Montreal Canadiens	3–0	Chicago Black Hawks	7–6–2	16
16	November 22	Chicago Black Hawks	2–5	Toronto Maple Leafs	7–7–2	16
17	November 23	Boston Bruins	1–4	Chicago Black Hawks	8–7–2	18
18	November 25	Chicago Black Hawks	1–4	Detroit Red Wings	8–8–2	18
19	November 26	Detroit Red Wings	0–5	Chicago Black Hawks	9–8–2	20
20	November 29	Chicago Black Hawks	1–1	New York Rangers	9–8–3	21

December

Game	Date	Visitor	Score	Home	Record	Points
21	December 2	Chicago Black Hawks	0–0	Toronto Maple Leafs	9–8–4	22
22	December 3	Toronto Maple Leafs	3–3	Chicago Black Hawks	9–8–5	23
23	December 6	Chicago Black Hawks	4–5	Boston Bruins	9–9–5	23
24	December 9	Chicago Black Hawks	5–0	Montreal Canadiens	10–9–5	25
25	December 10	New York Rangers	3–3	Chicago Black Hawks	10–9–6	26
26	December 14	Toronto Maple Leafs	7–1	Chicago Black Hawks	10–10–6	26
27	December 16	Chicago Black Hawks	3–2	Toronto Maple Leafs	11–10–6	28
28	December 17	Montreal Canadiens	7–3	Chicago Black Hawks	11–11–6	28
29	December 19	Chicago Black Hawks	1–6	Detroit Red Wings	11–12–6	28
30	December 21	Boston Bruins	3–1	Chicago Black Hawks	11–13–6	28
31	December 24	Chicago Black Hawks	1–6	New York Rangers	11–14–6	28
32	December 25	Chicago Black Hawks	4–7	Boston Bruins	11–15–6	28
33	December 27	Chicago Black Hawks	4–4	Boston Bruins	11–15–7	29
34	December 30	Chicago Black Hawks	3–4	Montreal Canadiens	11–16–7	29

January

Game	Date	Visitor	Score	Home	Record	Points
35	January 1	Montreal Canadiens	3–3	Chicago Black Hawks	11–16–8	30
36	January 4	Chicago Black Hawks	0–1	Detroit Red Wings	11–17–8	30
37	January 7	Chicago Black Hawks	2–3	New York Rangers	11–18–8	30
38	January 9	Boston Bruins	5–4	Chicago Black Hawks	11–19–8	30
39	January 11	Chicago Black Hawks	1–4	Montreal Canadiens	11–20–8	30
40	January 13	Chicago Black Hawks	3–3	Toronto Maple Leafs	11–20–9	31
41	January 14	Chicago Black Hawks	1–5	Boston Bruins	11–21–9	31
42	January 17	Detroit Red Wings	4–2	Chicago Black Hawks	11–22–9	31
43	January 18	Chicago Black Hawks	2–3	Detroit Red Wings	11–23–9	31
44	January 21	Montreal Canadiens	3–2	Chicago Black Hawks	11–24–9	31
45	January 23	Detroit Red Wings	8–2	Chicago Black Hawks	11–25–9	31
46	January 25	New York Rangers	2–1	Chicago Black Hawks	11–26–9	31
47	January 27	Chicago Black Hawks	2–4	Montreal Canadiens	11–27–9	31
48	January 28	Toronto Maple Leafs	4–3	Chicago Black Hawks	11–28–9	31

February

Game	Date	Visitor	Score	Home	Record	Points
49	February 1	Boston Bruins	2–5	Chicago Black Hawks	12–28–9	33
50	February 3	Chicago Black Hawks	3–6	Toronto Maple Leafs	12–29–9	33
51	February 4	New York Rangers	4–4	Chicago Black Hawks	12–29–10	34
52	February 7	Chicago Black Hawks	3–11	Detroit Red Wings	12–30–10	34
53	February 8	Detroit Red Wings	4–3	Chicago Black Hawks	12–31–10	34
54	February 11	Toronto Maple Leafs	5–3	Chicago Black Hawks	12–32–10	34
55	February 14	Chicago Black Hawks	1–5	New York Rangers	12–33–10	34
56	February 15	New York Rangers	7–3	Chicago Black Hawks	12–34–10	34
57	February 18	Boston Bruins	7–3	Chicago Black Hawks	12–35–10	34
58	February 22	Montreal Canadiens	2–3	Chicago Black Hawks	13–35–10	36
59	February 25	Boston Bruins	3–2	Chicago Black Hawks	13–36–10	36

March

Game	Date	Visitor	Score	Home	Record	Points
60	March 1	New York Rangers	4–1	Chicago Black Hawks	13–37–10	36
61	March 3	Chicago Black Hawks	0–3	Toronto Maple Leafs	13–38–10	36
62	March 4	Chicago Black Hawks	2–10	Boston Bruins	13–39–10	36
63	March 7	Chicago Black Hawks	1–3	New York Rangers	13–40–10	36
64	March 10	Chicago Black Hawks	2–12	Montreal Canadiens	13–41–10	36
65	March 11	Detroit Red Wings	7–0	Chicago Black Hawks	13–42–10	36
66	March 15	Toronto Maple Leafs	5–3	Chicago Black Hawks	13–43–10	36
67	March 17	Chicago Black Hawks	2–8	Detroit Red Wings	13–44–10	36
68	March 18	Detroit Red Wings	4–3	Chicago Black Hawks	13–45–10	36
69	March 21	Chicago Black Hawks	5–6	Boston Bruins	13–46–10	36
70	March 25	Chicago Black Hawks	2–5	New York Rangers	13–47–10	36

Legend: Win (2 points) Loss (0 points) Tie (1 point)

== Player statistics ==
=== Scoring leaders ===
Player	GP	G	A	Pts	PIM
Roy Conacher	70	26	24	50	16
Pete Babando	70	18	19	37	36
Jim Conacher	52	10	27	37	16
Bill Mosienko	65	21	15	36	18
Bep Guidolin	69	12	22	34	56

=== Goaltending ===
Player	GP	TOI	W	L	T	GA	SO	GAA
Harry Lumley	64	3785	12	41	10	246	3	3.90
Marcel Pelletier	6	355	1	5	0	29	0	4.90
Red Almas	1	60	0	1	0	5	0	5.00
