= 1950–51 Detroit Red Wings season =

Sports season

1950–51 Detroit Red Wings
- League: 1st NHL
- 1950–51 record: 44–13–13
- Home record: 25–3–7
- Road record: 19–10–6
- Goals for: 236
- Goals against: 139

Team information
- General manager: Jack Adams
- Coach: Tommy Ivan
- Captain: Sid Abel
- Alternate captains: Red Kelly
- Arena: Detroit Olympia

Team leaders
- Goals: Gordie Howe (43)
- Assists: Gordie Howe (43)
- Points: Gordie Howe (86)
- Penalty minutes: Ted Lindsay (110)
- Wins: Terry Sawchuk (44)
- Goals against average: Terry Sawchuk (1.99)

The 1950–51 Detroit Red Wings season was the Red Wings' 25th season.

== Regular season ==
They were the first team in the NHL to achieve 100 points in a season.

=== Final standings ===
National Hockey League
		GP	W	L	T	GF	GA	DIFF	Pts
1	Detroit Red Wings	70	44	13	13	236	139	+97	101
2	Toronto Maple Leafs	70	41	16	13	212	138	+74	95
3	Montreal Canadiens	70	25	30	15	173	184	−11	65
4	Boston Bruins	70	22	30	18	178	197	−19	62
5	New York Rangers	70	20	29	21	169	201	−32	61
6	Chicago Black Hawks	70	13	47	10	171	280	−109	36

=== Record vs. opponents ===
1950–51 NHL Records
Team	BOS	CHI	DET	MTL	NYR	TOR
Boston	—	9–4–1	2–8–4	5–6–3	4–2–8	2–10–2
Chicago	4–9–1	—	1–13	4–8–2	2–9–3	2–8–4
Detroit	8–2–4	13–1	—	8–4–2	8–3–3	7–3–4
Montreal	6–5–3	8–4–2	4–8–2	—	5–3–6	2–10–2
New York	2–4–8	9–2–3	5–7–2	3–5–6	—	3–10–1
Toronto	10–2–2	8–2–4	3–7–4	10–2–2	10–3–1	—

== Schedule and results ==
1950–51 regular season
October

Game	Result	Date	Score	Opponent	Record
1	W	October 11, 1950	3–2	New York Rangers (1950–51)	1–0–0
2	T	October 15, 1950	4–4	Toronto Maple Leafs (1950–51)	1–0–1
3	L	October 21, 1950	0–2	@ Montreal Canadiens (1950–51)	1–1–1
4	W	October 22, 1950	3–2	Montreal Canadiens (1950–51)	2–1–1
5	L	October 25, 1950	0–1	@ Toronto Maple Leafs (1950–51)	2–2–1
6	W	October 28, 1950	3–1	Chicago Black Hawks (1950–51)	3–2–1
7	W	October 29, 1950	2–0	Boston Bruins (1950–51)	4–2–1

November

Game	Result	Date	Score	Opponent	Record
8	T	November 2, 1950	2–2	New York Rangers (1950–51)	4–2–2
9	W	November 5, 1950	4–2	Boston Bruins (1950–51)	5–2–2
10	T	November 8, 1950	3–3	@ Boston Bruins (1950–51)	5–2–3
11	W	November 11, 1950	3–1	@ Toronto Maple Leafs (1950–51)	6–2–3
12	W	November 12, 1950	4–0	Montreal Canadiens (1950–51)	7–2–3
13	W	November 16, 1950	5–1	@ Chicago Black Hawks (1950–51)	8–2–3
14	W	November 18, 1950	2–1	@ Boston Bruins (1950–51)	9–2–3
15	T	November 19, 1950	3–3	@ New York Rangers (1950–51)	9–2–4
16	L	November 23, 1950	1–2	Toronto Maple Leafs (1950–51)	9–3–4
17	W	November 25, 1950	4–1	Chicago Black Hawks (1950–51)	10–3–4
18	L	November 26, 1950	0–5	@ Chicago Black Hawks (1950–51)	10–4–4
19	L	November 29, 1950	3–6	@ Boston Bruins (1950–51)	10–5–4

December

Game	Result	Date	Score	Opponent	Record
20	W	December 2, 1950	7–1	@ Montreal Canadiens (1950–51)	11–5–4
21	L	December 3, 1950	1–4	Montreal Canadiens (1950–51)	11–6–4
22	W	December 6, 1950	9–0	@ New York Rangers (1950–51)	12–6–4
23	W	December 9, 1950	5–0	New York Rangers (1950–51)	13–6–4
24	W	December 10, 1950	3–2	Toronto Maple Leafs (1950–51)	14–6–4
25	W	December 13, 1950	4–3	@ Toronto Maple Leafs (1950–51)	15–6–4
26	W	December 14, 1950	4–2	Boston Bruins (1950–51)	16–6–4
27	W	December 16, 1950	4–1	@ Boston Bruins (1950–51)	17–6–4
28	T	December 17, 1950	3–3	@ New York Rangers (1950–51)	17–6–5
29	W	December 19, 1950	6–1	Chicago Black Hawks (1950–51)	18–6–5
30	T	December 23, 1950	4–4	@ Montreal Canadiens (1950–51)	18–6–6
31	W	December 25, 1950	4–1	New York Rangers (1950–51)	19–6–6
32	W	December 28, 1950	8–1	Montreal Canadiens (1950–51)	20–6–6
33	W	December 30, 1950	3–1	@ Toronto Maple Leafs (1950–51)	21–6–6
34	L	December 31, 1950	2–4	Toronto Maple Leafs (1950–51)	21–7–6

January

Game	Result	Date	Score	Opponent	Record
35	L	January 3, 1951	3–5	@ New York Rangers (1950–51)	21–8–6
36	W	January 4, 1951	1–0	Chicago Black Hawks (1950–51)	22–8–6
37	L	January 6, 1951	2–5	@ Montreal Canadiens (1950–51)	22–9–6
38	W	January 7, 1951	3–0	Boston Bruins (1950–51)	23–9–6
39	T	January 9, 1951	3–3	Toronto Maple Leafs (1950–51)	23–9–7
40	W	January 13, 1951	4–2	New York Rangers (1950–51)	24–9–7
41	W	January 14, 1951	3–2	Montreal Canadiens (1950–51)	25–9–7
42	W	January 17, 1951	4–2	@ Chicago Black Hawks (1950–51)	26–9–7
43	W	January 18, 1951	3–2	Chicago Black Hawks (1950–51)	27–9–7
44	T	January 21, 1951	0–0	Toronto Maple Leafs (1950–51)	27–9–8
45	W	January 23, 1951	8–2	@ Chicago Black Hawks (1950–51)	28–9–8
46	T	January 25, 1951	3–3	Boston Bruins (1950–51)	28–9–9
47	L	January 27, 1951	0–3	@ Boston Bruins (1950–51)	28–10–9
48	L	January 28, 1951	3–5	@ New York Rangers (1950–51)	28–11–9

February

Game	Result	Date	Score	Opponent	Record
49	W	February 1, 1951	3–2	New York Rangers (1950–51)	29–11–9
50	T	February 4, 1951	3–3	Montreal Canadiens (1950–51)	29–11–10
51	W	February 7, 1951	11–3	Chicago Black Hawks (1950–51)	30–11–10
52	W	February 8, 1951	4–3	@ Chicago Black Hawks (1950–51)	31–11–10
53	W	February 10, 1951	2–1	@ Toronto Maple Leafs (1950–51)	32–11–10
54	W	February 11, 1951	2–1	@ Boston Bruins (1950–51)	33–11–10
55	W	February 17, 1951	2–1	@ Montreal Canadiens (1950–51)	34–11–10
56	T	February 19, 1951	2–2	Boston Bruins (1950–51)	34–11–11
57	T	February 21, 1951	2–2	@ Toronto Maple Leafs (1950–51)	34–11–12
58	L	February 25, 1951	2–6	@ New York Rangers (1950–51)	34–12–12
59	T	February 28, 1951	1–1	@ Boston Bruins (1950–51)	34–12–13

March

Game	Result	Date	Score	Opponent	Record
60	W	March 3, 1951	3–1	@ Montreal Canadiens (1950–51)	35–12–13
61	W	March 5, 1951	3–1	Toronto Maple Leafs (1950–51)	36–12–13
62	W	March 7, 1951	3–0	@ Toronto Maple Leafs (1950–51)	37–12–13
63	W	March 10, 1951	3–2	New York Rangers (1950–51)	38–12–13
64	W	March 11, 1951	7–0	@ Chicago Black Hawks (1950–51)	39–12–13
65	W	March 15, 1951	4–0	Boston Bruins (1950–51)	40–12–13
66	W	March 17, 1951	8–2	Chicago Black Hawks (1950–51)	41–12–13
67	W	March 18, 1951	4–3	@ Chicago Black Hawks (1950–51)	42–12–13
68	W	March 21, 1951	4–1	@ New York Rangers (1950–51)	43–12–13
69	L	March 24, 1951	2–3	@ Montreal Canadiens (1950–51)	43–13–13
70	W	March 25, 1951	5–0	Montreal Canadiens (1950–51)	44–13–13

Legend: Win (2 points) Loss (0 points) Tie (1 point)

== Player statistics ==
=== Regular season ===
Scoring

Player	Pos	GP	G	A	Pts	PIM
Gordie Howe	RW	70	43	43	86	74
Sid Abel	C/LW	69	23	38	61	30
Ted Lindsay	LW	67	24	35	59	110
Red Kelly	D/C	70	17	37	54	24
Jimmy Peters	RW	68	17	21	38	14
Metro Prystai	C	62	20	17	37	27
George Gee	C	70	17	20	37	19
Jim McFadden	C	70	14	18	32	10
Gaye Stewart	LW	67	18	13	31	18
Marty Pavelich	LW	67	9	20	29	41
Bob Goldham	D	61	5	18	23	31
Leo Reise Jr.	D	68	5	16	21	67
Gerry Couture	RW	53	7	6	13	2
Glen Skov	C/LW	19	7	6	13	13
Vic Stasiuk	LW	50	3	10	13	12
Clare Martin	D	50	1	6	7	12
Marcel Pronovost	D	37	1	6	7	20
Joe Carveth	RW	30	1	4	5	0
Rags Raglan	D	33	3	1	4	14
Leo Gravelle	RW	18	1	2	3	6
Lee Fogolin Sr.	D	19	0	1	1	16
Lou Jankowski	C/RW	1	0	1	1	0
Steve Black	LW	5	0	0	0	2
Alex Delvecchio	C/LW	1	0	0	0	0
Terry Sawchuk	G	70	0	0	0	2
Benny Woit	RW/D	2	0	0	0	2

Goaltending

Player	MIN	GP	W	L	T	GA	GAA	SO
Terry Sawchuk	4200	70	44	13	13	139	1.99	11
Team:	4200	70	44	13	13	139	1.99	11

=== Playoffs ===
Scoring

Player	Pos	GP	G	A	Pts	PIM
Sid Abel	C/LW	6	4	3	7	0
Gordie Howe	RW	6	4	3	7	4
Leo Reise Jr.	D	6	2	3	5	2
Gerry Couture	RW	6	1	1	2	0
Gaye Stewart	LW	6	0	2	2	4
Metro Prystai	C	3	1	0	1	0
George Gee	C	6	0	1	1	0
Bob Goldham	D	6	0	1	1	2
Red Kelly	D/C	6	0	1	1	0
Ted Lindsay	LW	6	0	1	1	8
Marty Pavelich	LW	6	0	1	1	2
Fred Glover	C	6	0	0	0	0
Clare Martin	D	2	0	0	0	0
Jim McFadden	C	6	0	0	0	2
Max McNab	C	2	0	0	0	0
Jimmy Peters	RW	6	0	0	0	0
Marcel Pronovost	D	6	0	0	0	0
Terry Sawchuk	G	6	0	0	0	0
Glen Skov	C/LW	6	0	0	0	0
Johnny Wilson	LW	1	0	0	0	0
Benny Woit	RW/D	4	0	0	0	2

Goaltending

Player	MIN	GP	W	L	GA	GAA	SO
Terry Sawchuk	463	6	2	4	13	1.68	1
Team:	463	6	2	4	13	1.68	1

Note: GP = Games played; G = Goals; A = Assists; Pts = Points; +/- = Plus-minus PIM = Penalty minutes; PPG = Power-play goals; SHG = Short-handed goals; GWG = Game-winning goals;
MIN = Minutes played; W = Wins; L = Losses; T = Ties; GA = Goals against; GAA = Goals-against average; SO = Shutouts;

== See also ==
- 1950–51 NHL season
