= Max Quackenbush =

Canadian ice hockey player (1928–2020)

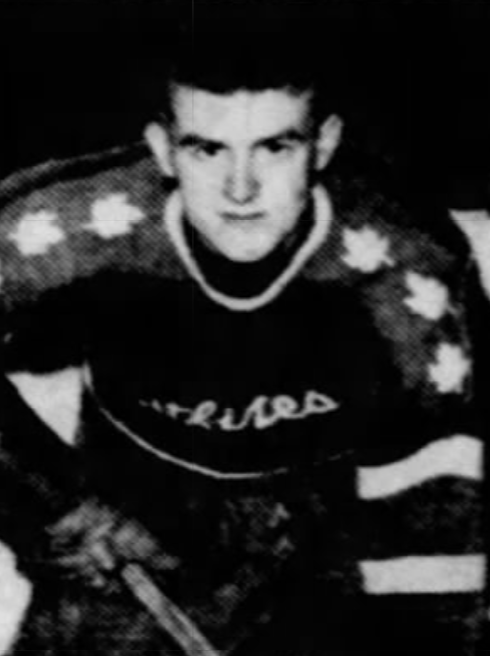
- With the Windsor Spitfires, c. 1948
- Born: August 29, 1928; Toronto, Ontario, Canada
- Died: April 17, 2020 (aged 91); Halifax, Nova Scotia, Canada
- Height: 6 ft 2 in (188 cm)
- Weight: 180 lb (82 kg; 12 st 12 lb)
- Position: Defence
- Shot: Left
- Played for: Boston Bruins; Chicago Black Hawks
- Playing career: 1947–1955

Maxwell Joseph Quackenbush (August 29, 1928 — April 17, 2020) was a Canadian professional ice hockey player who played 61 games in the National Hockey League for the Chicago Black Hawks and Boston Bruins between 1950 and 1951. The rest of his career, which lasted from 1947 to 1955, was spent in the minor leagues. He was the younger brother of Bill Quackenbush. In his post-hockey career, he served with the Metropolitan Toronto Police Force, and was known to many elementary school children in the '60s and '70s as "Constable Quackenbush", instructing them on traffic safety in partnership with Elmer the Safety Elephant.

His son, Ross, played for the Canadian National Basketball team in the 1970s, and served as the head coach of the St. Mary's (Halifax) University basketball team for many year. Quackenbush died in Halifax in 2020; he had Alzheimer's disease in his later years.

== Career statistics ==
=== Regular season and playoffs ===
			Regular season					Playoffs
Season	Team	League	GP	G	A	Pts	PIM	GP	G	A	Pts	PIM
1944–45	De La Salle College	CA-HS	11	14	13	27	28	2	2	1	3	2
1945–46	De La Salle College	CA-HS	8	18	13	31	12	12	9	7	16	6
1946–47	De La Salle College	CA-HS	8	16	10	26	18	11	11	5	16	39
1947–48	Windsor Spitfires	OHA	35	8	22	30	82	12	1	0	1	23
1947–48	Windsor Hettche Spitfires	IHL	23	5	9	14	71	—	—	—	—	—
1948–49	Omaha Knights	USHL	66	3	14	17	61	4	0	1	1	0
1949–50	Indianapolis Capitals	AHL	68	6	22	28	34	4	0	1	1	0
1950–51	Indianapolis Capitals	AHL	23	2	4	6	24	—	—	—	—	—
1950–51	Boston Bruins	NHL	47	4	6	10	26	6	0	0	0	4
1951–52	St. Louis Flyers	AHL	50	5	15	20	54	—	—	—	—	—
1951–52	Chicago Black Hawks	NHL	14	0	1	1	4	—	—	—	—	—
1952–53	Calgary Stampeders	WHL	65	2	21	23	31	3	0	1	1	0
1953–54	Calgary Stampeders	WHL	70	11	28	39	48	18	3	4	7	2
1954–55	Calgary Stampeders	WHL	63	8	24	32	56	9	1	3	4	4
NHL totals			61	4	7	11	30	6	0	0	0	4
