= 1950–51 Montreal Canadiens season =

NHL hockey team season

1950–51 Montreal Canadiens
- League: 3rd NHL
- 1950–51 record: 25–30–15
- Home record: 17–10–8
- Road record: 8–20–7
- Goals for: 173
- Goals against: 184

Team information
- General manager: Frank J. Selke
- Coach: Dick Irvin
- Captain: Emile Bouchard
- Arena: Montreal Forum

Team leaders
- Goals: Maurice Richard (42)
- Assists: Maurice Richard, Elmer Lach and Doug Harvey (24)
- Points: Maurice Richard (66)
- Penalty minutes: Tom Johnson (128)
- Wins: Gerry McNeil (25)
- Goals against average: Gerry McNeill (2.63)

The 1950–51 Montreal Canadiens season was the 42nd in franchise history. The team placed third in the regular season to qualify for the playoffs. The Canadiens lost in the Stanley Cup Final series against Toronto Maple Leafs four games to one. The five games were decided in overtime.

== Regular season ==
=== Final standings ===
National Hockey League
		GP	W	L	T	GF	GA	DIFF	Pts
1	Detroit Red Wings	70	44	13	13	236	139	+97	101
2	Toronto Maple Leafs	70	41	16	13	212	138	+74	95
3	Montreal Canadiens	70	25	30	15	173	184	−11	65
4	Boston Bruins	70	22	30	18	178	197	−19	62
5	New York Rangers	70	20	29	21	169	201	−32	61
6	Chicago Black Hawks	70	13	47	10	171	280	−109	36

=== Record vs. opponents ===
1950–51 NHL Records
Team	BOS	CHI	DET	MTL	NYR	TOR
Boston	—	9–4–1	2–8–4	5–6–3	4–2–8	2–10–2
Chicago	4–9–1	—	1–13	4–8–2	2–9–3	2–8–4
Detroit	8–2–4	13–1	—	8–4–2	8–3–3	7–3–4
Montreal	6–5–3	8–4–2	4–8–2	—	5–3–6	2–10–2
New York	2–4–8	9–2–3	5–7–2	3–5–6	—	3–10–1
Toronto	10–2–2	8–2–4	3–7–4	10–2–2	10–3–1	—

== Schedule and results ==
1950–51 regular season
October

Game	Result	Date	Score	Opponent	Record
1	T	October 12, 1950	3–3	Chicago Black Hawks (1950–51)	0–0–1
2	T	October 14, 1950	1–1	Boston Bruins (1950–51)	0–0–2
3	W	October 15, 1950	2–1	@ Boston Bruins (1950–51)	1–0–2
4	W	October 19, 1950	4–0	New York Rangers (1950–51)	2–0–2
5	W	October 21, 1950	2–0	Detroit Red Wings (1950–51)	3–0–2
6	L	October 22, 1950	2–3	@ Detroit Red Wings (1950–51)	3–1–2
7	L	October 26, 1950	1–5	@ Chicago Black Hawks (1950–51)	3–2–2
8	W	October 28, 1950	5–1	New York Rangers (1950–51)	4–2–2
9	T	October 29, 1950	2–2	@ New York Rangers (1950–51)	4–2–3

November

Game	Result	Date	Score	Opponent	Record
10	L	November 1, 1950	3–5	@ Toronto Maple Leafs (1950–51)	4–3–3
11	L	November 2, 1950	1–2	Toronto Maple Leafs (1950–51)	4–4–3
12	L	November 4, 1950	2–3	Boston Bruins (1950–51)	4–5–3
13	L	November 9, 1950	1–2	@ Chicago Black Hawks (1950–51)	4–6–3
14	T	November 11, 1950	1–1	New York Rangers (1950–51)	4–6–4
15	L	November 12, 1950	0–4	@ Detroit Red Wings (1950–51)	4–7–4
16	W	November 16, 1950	5–2	Toronto Maple Leafs (1950–51)	5–7–4
17	W	November 18, 1950	3–2	Chicago Black Hawks (1950–51)	6–7–4
18	W	November 19, 1950	3–0	@ Chicago Black Hawks (1950–51)	7–7–4
19	L	November 22, 1950	2–3	@ New York Rangers (1950–51)	7–8–4
20	L	November 25, 1950	1–4	@ Toronto Maple Leafs (1950–51)	7–9–4
21	W	November 26, 1950	3–1	@ Boston Bruins (1950–51)	8–9–4
22	T	November 30, 1950	0–0	Toronto Maple Leafs (1950–51)	8–9–5

December

Game	Result	Date	Score	Opponent	Record
23	L	December 2, 1950	1–7	Detroit Red Wings (1950–51)	8–10–5
24	W	December 3, 1950	4–1	@ Detroit Red Wings (1950–51)	9–10–5
25	L	December 6, 1950	1–3	@ Toronto Maple Leafs (1950–51)	9–11–5
26	L	December 7, 1950	0–3	Boston Bruins (1950–51)	9–12–5
27	L	December 9, 1950	0–5	Chicago Black Hawks (1950–51)	9–13–5
28	L	December 10, 1950	2–5	@ Boston Bruins (1950–51)	9–14–5
29	L	December 13, 1950	2–3	@ New York Rangers (1950–51)	9–15–5
30	T	December 16, 1950	1–1	New York Rangers (1950–51)	9–15–6
31	W	December 17, 1950	7–3	@ Chicago Black Hawks (1950–51)	10–15–6
32	L	December 20, 1950	1–6	@ Toronto Maple Leafs (1950–51)	10–16–6
33	T	December 23, 1950	4–4	Detroit Red Wings (1950–51)	10–16–7
34	L	December 28, 1950	1–8	@ Detroit Red Wings (1950–51)	10–17–7
35	W	December 30, 1950	4–3	Chicago Black Hawks (1950–51)	11–17–7

January

Game	Result	Date	Score	Opponent	Record
36	T	January 1, 1951	3–3	@ Chicago Black Hawks (1950–51)	11–17–8
37	L	January 4, 1951	2–4	Boston Bruins (1950–51)	11–18–8
38	W	January 6, 1951	5–2	Detroit Red Wings (1950–51)	12–18–8
39	W	January 10, 1951	3–0	@ New York Rangers (1950–51)	13–18–8
40	W	January 11, 1951	4–1	Chicago Black Hawks (1950–51)	14–18–8
41	W	January 13, 1951	4–0	Boston Bruins (1950–51)	15–18–8
42	L	January 14, 1951	2–3	@ Detroit Red Wings (1950–51)	15–19–8
43	L	January 18, 1951	2–5	Toronto Maple Leafs (1950–51)	15–20–8
44	T	January 20, 1951	2–2	New York Rangers (1950–51)	15–20–9
45	W	January 21, 1951	3–2	@ Chicago Black Hawks (1950–51)	16–20–9
46	L	January 24, 1951	3–4	@ Toronto Maple Leafs (1950–51)	16–21–9
47	W	January 27, 1951	4–2	Chicago Black Hawks (1950–51)	17–21–9
48	T	January 28, 1951	1–1	@ Boston Bruins (1950–51)	17–21–10

February

Game	Result	Date	Score	Opponent	Record
49	L	February 1, 1951	1–3	Toronto Maple Leafs (1950–51)	17–22–10
50	W	February 3, 1951	4–1	Boston Bruins (1950–51)	18–22–10
51	T	February 4, 1951	3–3	@ Detroit Red Wings (1950–51)	18–22–11
52	L	February 7, 1951	1–3	@ Toronto Maple Leafs (1950–51)	18–23–11
53	L	February 10, 1951	0–6	@ Boston Bruins (1950–51)	18–24–11
54	L	February 11, 1951	1–3	@ New York Rangers (1950–51)	18–25–11
55	T	February 15, 1951	2–2	Toronto Maple Leafs (1950–51)	18–25–12
56	L	February 17, 1951	1–2	Detroit Red Wings (1950–51)	18–26–12
57	L	February 22, 1951	2–3	@ Chicago Black Hawks (1950–51)	18–27–12
58	W	February 24, 1951	6–2	New York Rangers (1950–51)	19–27–12

March

Game	Result	Date	Score	Opponent	Record
59	W	March 1, 1951	3–1	Toronto Maple Leafs (1950–51)	20–27–12
60	L	March 3, 1951	1–3	Detroit Red Wings (1950–51)	20–28–12
61	T	March 4, 1951	2–2	@ New York Rangers (1950–51)	20–28–13
62	W	March 7, 1951	3–2	@ Boston Bruins (1950–51)	21–28–13
63	W	March 10, 1951	12–2	Chicago Black Hawks (1950–51)	22–28–13
64	T	March 11, 1951	5–5	@ New York Rangers (1950–51)	22–28–14
65	W	March 15, 1951	5–3	New York Rangers (1950–51)	23–28–14
66	W	March 17, 1951	3–1	Boston Bruins (1950–51)	24–28–14
67	T	March 18, 1951	2–2	@ Boston Bruins (1950–51)	24–28–15
68	L	March 21, 1951	0–2	@ Toronto Maple Leafs (1950–51)	24–29–15
69	W	March 24, 1951	3–2	Detroit Red Wings (1950–51)	25–29–15
70	L	March 25, 1951	0–5	@ Detroit Red Wings (1950–51)	25–30–15

Legend: Win (2 points) Loss (0 points) Tie (1 point)

== Playoffs ==
The Canadiens first played the Detroit Red Wings in the semi-finals. The first four games of the series was won by the visiting team. The Canadiens then won the last two to win the series four games to two to advance to the final against Toronto.

Date	Home	Score	Visitor	Score	Notes
March 27	Detroit Red Wings	2	Montreal Canadiens	3	(OT)
March 29	Detroit Red Wings	0	Montreal Canadiens	1	(OT)
March 31	Montreal Canadiens	0	Detroit Red Wings	2	
April 3	Montreal Canadiens	1	Detroit Red Wings	4	
April 5	Detroit Red Wings	2	Montreal Canadiens	5	
April 7	Montreal Canadiens	3	Detroit Red Wings	2	

=== Stanley Cup Final ===
The Canadiens lost to the Toronto Maple Leafs four games to one.

Date	Away	Score	Home	Score	Notes
April 11	Montreal	2	Toronto	3	OT
April 14	Montreal	3	Toronto	2	OT
April 17	Toronto	2	Montreal	1	OT
April 19	Toronto	3	Montreal	2	OT
April 21	Montreal	2	Toronto	3	OT

== Player statistics ==
=== Regular season ===
==== Scoring ====
Player	Pos	GP	G	A	Pts	PIM
Maurice Richard	RW	65	42	24	66	97
Elmer Lach	C	65	21	24	45	48
Bert Olmstead	LW	39	16	22	38	50
Ken Mosdell	C	66	13	18	31	24
Doug Harvey	D	70	5	24	29	93
Calum MacKay	LW	70	18	10	28	69
Floyd Curry	RW	69	13	14	27	23
Billy Reay	C	60	6	18	24	24
Norm Dussault	C	64	4	20	24	15
Bud MacPherson	D	62	0	16	16	40
Bernie Geoffrion	RW	18	8	6	14	9
Glen Harmon	D	57	2	12	14	27
Emile Bouchard	D	52	3	10	13	80
Vern Kaiser	LW	50	7	5	12	33
Tom Johnson	D	70	2	8	10	128
Leo Gravelle	RW	31	4	2	6	0
Paul Meger	LW	17	2	4	6	6
Paul Masnick	C	43	4	1	5	14
Bob Dawes	D/C	15	0	5	5	4
Jean Beliveau	C	2	1	1	2	0
Bert Hirschfeld	LW	20	0	2	2	0
Hal Laycoe	D	38	0	2	2	25
Frank King	C	10	1	0	1	2
Claude Robert	LW	23	1	0	1	9
Gerry Desaulniers	C	3	0	1	1	2
Fred Burchell	C	2	0	0	0	0
Hugh Currie	D	1	0	0	0	0
Lulu Denis	RW	1	0	0	0	0
Dick Gamble	LW	1	0	0	0	0
Tom Manastersky	D	6	0	0	0	11
Gerry McNeil	G	70	0	0	0	0
Gerry Plamondon	LW	1	0	0	0	0
Ernie Roche	D	4	0	0	0	2
Dollard St. Laurent	D	3	0	0	0	0

==== Goaltending ====
Player	MIN	GP	W	L	T	GA	GAA	SO
Gerry McNeil	4200	70	25	30	15	184	2.63	6
Team:	4200	70	25	30	15	184	2.63	6

=== Playoffs ===
==== Scoring ====
Player	Pos	GP	G	A	Pts	PIM
Maurice Richard	RW	11	9	4	13	13
Billy Reay	C	11	3	3	6	10
Bert Olmstead	LW	11	2	4	6	9
Doug Harvey	D	11	0	5	5	12
Elmer Lach	C	11	2	2	4	2
Paul Meger	LW	11	1	3	4	4
Paul Masnick	C	11	2	1	3	4
Emile Bouchard	D	11	1	1	2	2
Bernie Geoffrion	RW	11	1	1	2	6
Ken Mosdell	C	11	1	1	2	4
Floyd Curry	RW	11	0	2	2	2
Bud MacPherson	D	11	0	2	2	8
Calum MacKay	LW	11	1	0	1	0
Sid McNabney	C	5	0	1	1	2
Bob Dawes	D/C	1	0	0	0	0
Glen Harmon	D	1	0	0	0	0
Tom Johnson	D	11	0	0	0	6
Vern Kaiser	LW	2	0	0	0	0
Ross Lowe	D/LW	2	0	0	0	0
Eddie Mazur	D/LW	2	0	0	0	0
Gerry McNeil	G	11	0	0	0	0

==== Goaltending ====
Player	MIN	GP	W	L	GA	GAA	SO
Gerry McNeil	785	11	5	6	25	1.91	1
Team:	785	11	5	6	25	1.91	1

Note:

Pos = Position;GP = Games played; G = Goals; A = Assists; Pts = Points; PIM = Penalty minutes; +/- = Plus/minus; PPG = Power-play goals; SHG = Short-handed goals; GWG = Game-winning goals
Pos = Position;GP = Games played; Min, TOI = Minutes played; W = Wins; L = Losses; T,T/OT = Ties; OTL = Overtime losses; GA = Goals-against; GAA = Goals-against average; SO = Shutouts; SA = Shots against; SV = Shots saved;SV% = Save percentage;

== See also ==
- 1950–51 NHL season
