= Ray Timgren =

Canadian ice hockey player

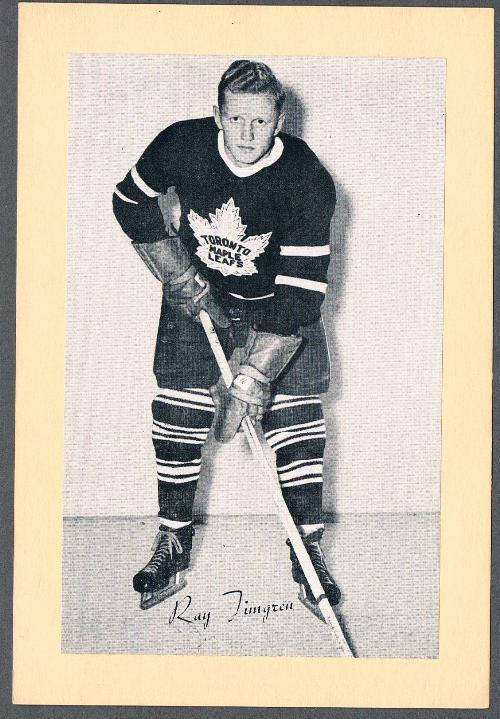
- Born: September 29, 1928 Windsor, Ontario, Canada
- Died: November 25, 1999 (aged 71) North York, Ontario, Canada
- Height: 5 ft 9 in (175 cm)
- Weight: 160 lb (73 kg; 11 st 6 lb)
- Position: Left wing
- Shot: Left
- Played for: Toronto Maple Leafs; Chicago Black Hawks
- Playing career: 1948–1955

Raymond Charles Timgren (September 29, 1928 – November 25, 1999) was a Canadian professional ice hockey forward, nicknamed the "Golden Boy". He played in the National Hockey League with the Toronto Maple Leafs and Chicago Black Hawks between 1948 and 1955.

== Playing career ==
Timgren was born in Windsor, Ontario and started his National Hockey League career with the Toronto Maple Leafs in 1949. He also played for the Chicago Black Hawks. He left the NHL after the 1954–55 season. He played for the Pittsburgh Hornets of the American Hockey League in 1956 before retiring from hockey. He won the Stanley Cup twice with the Toronto Maple Leafs, in 1949 and 1951.

== Personal life ==
In the 1960s he was teaching with the North York Board of Education, and in 1964 was a vice principal at Sloane Ave Public School. "Do it now!" was one of his favorite sayings and he never put off what he could now! Ray was also Principal at Mallow Road Public School in Don Mills in the late 1960s - 1970s and then at Glen Rush Public School.

Timgren's parents emigrated to Canada from Terjärv, in Finland.

== Career statistics ==
=== Regular season and playoffs ===
			Regular season					Playoffs
Season	Team	League	GP	G	A	Pts	PIM	GP	G	A	Pts	PIM
1944–45	Toronto Young Leafs	OHA	—	—	—	—	—	10	10	8	18	—
1946–47	Toronto Marlboros	OHA	20	20	7	27	6	2	2	3	5	0
1946–47	Toronto Dorsts	TMHL	13	17	15	32	5	12	11	15	26	4
1947–48	Toronto Marlboros	OHA	33	21	20	41	33	5	1	1	2	2
1948–49	Toronto Maple Leafs	NHL	36	3	12	15	9	9	3	3	6	2
1948–49	Toronto Marlboros	OHA Sr	26	6	22	28	27	—	—	—	—	—
1949–50	Toronto Maple Leafs	NHL	68	7	18	25	22	6	0	4	4	2
1950–51	Toronto Maple Leafs	NHL	70	1	9	10	20	11	0	1	1	2
1951–52	Toronto Maple Leafs	NHL	50	2	4	6	11	4	0	1	1	0
1951–52	Pittsburgh Hornets	AHL	19	13	5	18	11	—	—	—	—	—
1952–53	Toronto Maple Leafs	NHL	12	0	0	0	4	—	—	—	—	—
1952–53	Pittsburgh Hornets	AHL	50	16	12	28	23	10	2	0	2	0
1953–54	Pittsburgh Hornets	AHL	70	22	30	52	27	5	1	1	2	2
1954–55	Chicago Black Hawks	NHL	14	1	1	2	2	—	—	—	—	—
1954–55	Pittsburgh Hornets	AHL	45	12	13	25	24	10	3	4	7	2
1954–55	Toronto Maple Leafs	NHL	1	0	0	0	2	—	—	—	—	—
1955–56	Pittsburgh Hornets	AHL	8	0	4	4	13	—	—	—	—	—
AHL totals			192	63	64	127	98	25	6	5	11	4
NHL totals			251	14	44	58	70	30	3	9	12	6
