= Bill Quackenbush =

Canadian ice hockey player (1922–1999)

- Hockey Hall of Fame, 1976
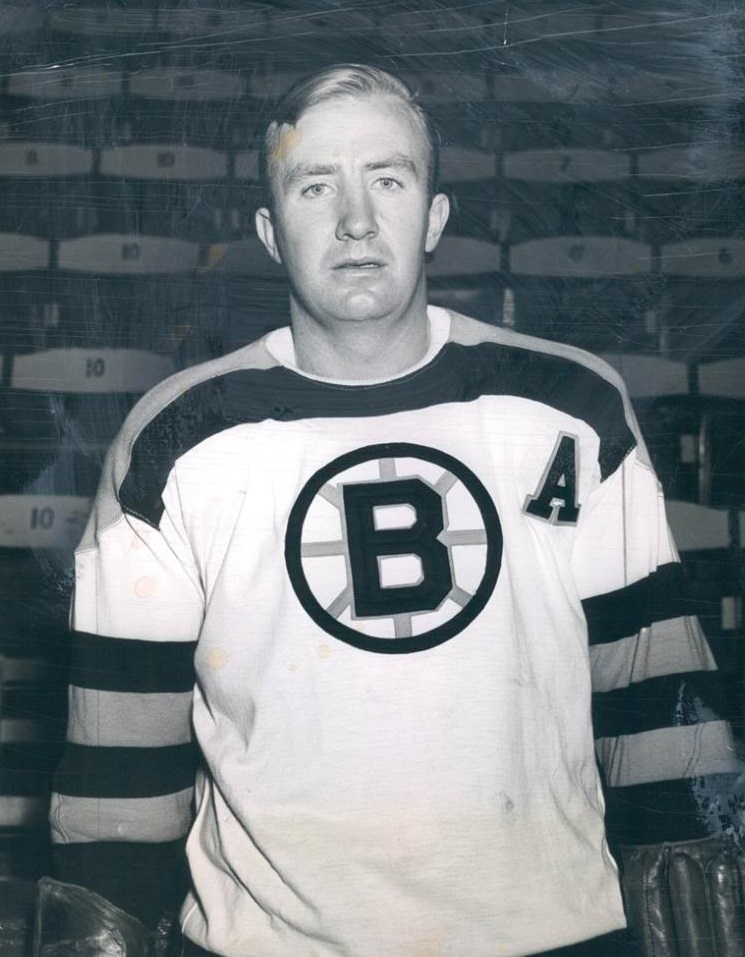
- Quackenbush with the Boston Bruins in 1951
- Born: March 2, 1922 Toronto, Ontario, Canada
- Died: September 12, 1999 (aged 77) Newtown, Pennsylvania, U.S.
- Height: 5 ft 11 in (180 cm)
- Weight: 180 lb (82 kg; 12 st 12 lb)
- Position: Defence
- Shot: Left
- Played for: Detroit Red Wings; Boston Bruins
- Playing career: 1942–1956
- Coaching career

Coaching career (HC unless noted)
- 1967–1973: Princeton (Men's)
- 1979–1985: Princeton (Women's)

Head coaching record
- Overall: 34–104–2 (.250) [Men's]

Hubert George "Bill" Quackenbush (March 2, 1922 – September 12, 1999) was a Canadian professional ice hockey player who was a defenceman for the Boston Bruins and Detroit Red Wings in the National Hockey League (NHL). During his 14-year career, he was the first defenceman to win the Lady Byng Memorial Trophy. He won the award after playing the entire 1948–49 season without recording a penalty. The penalty-less season was part of a total of 131 consecutive games he played without being assessed a penalty. Quackenbush, considered to be an elite offensive defenceman during his career, was named to the NHL All-Star team five times, played in eight NHL All-Star games and was inducted into the Hockey Hall of Fame in 1976.

Following his retirement from professional ice hockey, he spent 18 years as head coach of various teams at Princeton University. Quackenbush coached men's golf, and both the men's and women's ice hockey teams, at various times. He won eight Ivy League Championships with the men's golf team and three with the women's ice hockey team.

== Early life ==
Quackenbush was born on March 2, 1922, in Toronto, Ontario. He was born Hubert George Quackenbush but was given the nickname Bill by his aunt who disliked his given name. He played hockey on outdoor rinks around Toronto during the Great Depression as a youth, and was one of the top high school athletes in Canada as a teenager, attending Western Technical-Commercial School in Toronto's west end.

In addition to hockey, he was a renowned football and soccer player. During the war years, he played for the famous Canadian soccer club Toronto Scottish. Quackenbush had an opportunity to play football professionally, but he decided to pursue a career in hockey.

Quackenbush began his junior career playing for the Toronto Native Sons of the Ontario Hockey Association. He scored 13 points in 13 games during the 1940–41 season. The following season, he played for the Brantford Lions, scoring 34 points in 23 games, and caught the attention of the Detroit Red Wings of the National Hockey League.

== Professional career ==
Quackenbush signed as a free-agent with the Red Wings on October 19, 1942, and played 10 games during the 1942–43 season before breaking his wrist. After recovering from the injury, Detroit assigned him to the American Hockey League where he joined the Indianapolis Capitals. He earned a regular position with the Red Wings during the 1943–44 season, scoring 4 goals and 18 points. In the next two seasons he averaged 21 points while only being assessed an average of 8 penalty minutes and scored a career high 11 goals in 1945–46.

The following season he earned his first post-season honour, when he was named a Second Team NHL All-Star. He was also named the Red Wings team MVP. He registered a career high 17 penalty minutes in 1947–48 and was named a First Team All-Star. The season also saw the start of a streak of 131 consecutive games where Quackenbush was not assessed a penalty. It began with the final 5 regular season and 10 playoff games that year, continued through the entire 60 regular season and 11 playoff games during the 1948–49 season, and ended after 45 games of the 1949–50 season.

At the conclusion of the 1948–49 season, he was awarded the Lady Byng Trophy, the NHL's annual award for sportsmanship and gentlemanly conduct. He was the first defenceman to win the award, and remains one of only four in NHL history to capture the trophy. He also became the third and most recent Lady Byng recipient (after Syl Apps and Bill Mosienko) not to record a single penalty minute all season.

Detroit general manager Jack Adams detested the award and felt that any player who won it did not belong on his team, so he promptly traded Quackenbush. He was sent to the Boston Bruins with Pete Horeck for Pete Babando, Clare Martin and Jimmy Peters, Sr.

Quackenbush became a fan favourite upon his arrival in Boston, where his offensive style of play was compared to former Bruin (and fellow Hall of Famer) Eddie Shore. In his first season in Boston, Quackenbush scored 8 goals and 25 points. He continued to stay out of the penalty box, registering only 4 penalty minutes. However, it marked the first time in three seasons that he was not named to the NHL All-Star team. The Bruins defence core was depleted by injury in 1950–51, forcing the team to use several first year players.

While this resulted in Quackenbush having to play more minutes, including a game where he played 55 minutes, it also gave him the opportunity to play with his brother Max. It was the only time the two played professionally together. He also set a career high in points with 29 and was again named a First Team NHL All-Star. Over the next five seasons Quackenbush hovered around the 20 point mark and was never assessed more than 8 penalty minutes in a year.

Quackenbush retired following the 1955–56 season, having accumulated only 95 penalty minutes over 774 games. This averaged out to seven seconds a game, one of the lowest in NHL history for a player at any position. He was elected to the Hockey Hall of Fame in 1976.

== Personal ==
Following his NHL career, Quackenbush worked as a manufacturer's agent while attending night school at Northeastern University in Boston, Massachusetts. At Northeastern, he earned an Associate's degree in engineering. Quackenbush also became an assistant coach at Northeastern.

In 1967, he became the head coach for Princeton University's men's ice hockey team, a position he would hold for six seasons. His best season was his first in 1967–68, when the Tigers posted a 13–10–0 record. It was the highest win total for Princeton since 1935–36. However, his success with the men's ice hockey team would not last; Princeton won no more than five games for their next five seasons. His worst campaign was in 1970–71, when Princeton had two 11 game losing streaks and a 1–22–0 overall record. Because of this, Quackenbush stepped down as the head coach in 1973.

In 1969, he began coaching the Princeton men's golf team. He enjoyed much greater success with the golf team, leading them to eight Ivy League championships. In 1978, Princeton started a women's ice hockey team, and Quackenbush was asked to coach them. He was still coaching the golf team but decided to accept the additional position and led them to three consecutive Ivy League championships between 1982 and 1984. Quackenbush retired from coaching in 1985, after which he moved to Orlando, Florida, where he lived for several years before moving to New Jersey in 1997.

He married Joan Kalloch; the couple had three sons: Bruce, Scott and Todd. At the time of his death, Quackenbush had seven grandchildren.

He died of pneumonia and complications from Alzheimer's disease on September 12, 1999, at Chandler Hall Hospice in Newtown, Pennsylvania, aged 77.

== Playing style ==
Quackenbush was an offensive defenceman who carried the puck up the ice, making use of his stick handling, passing skills and ability to read the play. Over the course of his career, he was considered one of the elite rushing defenceman in the NHL. He was a solid checker, but relied more on positioning and discipline than physical play. This is evident by his low yearly average of penalty minutes and the fact that he was assessed only one major penalty throughout his NHL career.

Defensively he made use of poke checks to take the puck from his opponents and excelled at getting to loose pucks and clearing them out of the defensive zone. He was adept at keeping opposing forwards from creating offence from behind the net.

== Awards and honours ==
- Lady Byng Trophy (1949)
- Three time NHL first team All-Star (1948, 1949, 1951)
- Two time NHL second team All-Star (1947, 1953)
- Eight time NHL All-Star Game participant (1947, 1948, 1949, 1950, 1951, 1952, 1953, 1954)
- Honored Member of the Hockey Hall of Fame (1976)
- In 2023 he would be named one of the top 100 Bruins players of all time.

== Career statistics ==
			Regular season					Playoffs
Season	Team	League	GP	G	A	Pts	PIM	GP	G	A	Pts	PIM
1940–41	Toronto Native Sons	OHA-Jr.	13	4	9	13	0	—	—	—	—	—
1941–42	Brantford Lions	OHA-Jr.	23	5	29	34	16	7	2	4	6	8
1942–43	Detroit Red Wings	NHL	10	1	1	2	4	—	—	—	—	—
1942–43	Indianapolis Capitals	AHL	37	6	13	19	0	7	0	1	1	6
1943–44	Detroit Red Wings	NHL	43	4	14	18	6	2	1	0	1	0
1943–44	Indianapolis Capitals	AHL	1	1	0	1	0	—	—	—	—	—
1944–45	Detroit Red Wings	NHL	50	7	14	21	10	14	0	2	2	2
1945–46	Detroit Red Wings	NHL	48	11	10	21	6	5	0	1	1	0
1946–47	Detroit Red Wings	NHL	44	5	17	22	6	5	0	0	0	2
1947–48	Detroit Red Wings	NHL	58	6	16	22	17	10	0	2	2	0
1948–49	Detroit Red Wings	NHL	60	6	17	23	0	11	1	1	2	0
1949–50	Boston Bruins	NHL	70	8	17	25	4	—	—	—	—	—
1950–51	Boston Bruins	NHL	70	5	24	29	12	6	0	1	1	0
1951–52	Boston Bruins	NHL	69	2	17	19	6	7	0	3	3	0
1952–53	Boston Bruins	NHL	69	2	16	18	6	11	0	4	4	4
1953–54	Boston Bruins	NHL	45	0	17	17	6	4	4	0	0	0
1954–55	Boston Bruins	NHL	68	2	20	22	8	5	0	5	5	0
1955–56	Boston Bruins	NHL	70	3	22	25	4	—	—	—	—	—
NHL totals			774	62	222	284	95	80	2	19	21	8

- All statistics taken from NHL.com

== Head coaching record ==
=== Men's ===
Record table
Season	Team	Overall	Conference	Standing	Postseason
Princeton Tigers (ECAC Hockey) (1967–1973)
1967–68	Princeton	13–10–1	13–9–1	8th	ECAC Quarterfinals
1968–69	Princeton	5–19–0	5–18–0	16th	
1969–70	Princeton	5–17–1	5–15–1	14th	
1970–71	Princeton	1–22–0	1–20–0	17th	
1971–72	Princeton	5–18–0	5–14–0	t-14th	
1972–73	Princeton	5–18–0	3–18–0	16th	
Princeton:		34–104–2	32–94–2		
Total:		34–104–2			

Awards and achievements
Preceded by Buddy O'Connor	Winner of the Lady Byng Trophy; 1949	Succeeded by Edgar Laprade
