= Bob Hassard =

Canadian ice hockey player (1929–2010)

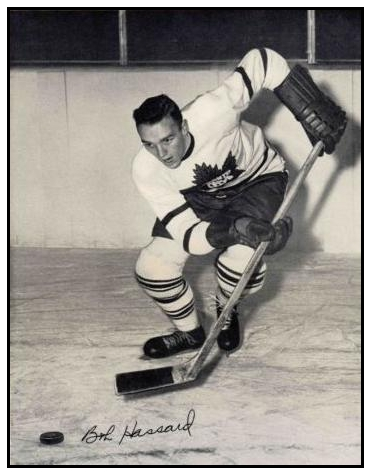
- Born: March 26, 1929 Lloydminster, Saskatchewan, Canada
- Died: December 30, 2010 (aged 81) Minden Hills, Ontario, Canada
- Height: 6 ft 0 in (183 cm)
- Weight: 170 lb (77 kg; 12 st 2 lb)
- Position: Centre
- Shot: Right
- Played for: Toronto Maple Leafs; Chicago Black Hawks
- Playing career: 1948–1960

Robert Harry Hassard (March 26, 1929 – December 30, 2010) was a Canadian ice hockey player. He played 126 games in the National Hockey League with the Toronto Maple Leafs and Chicago Black Hawks between 1949 and 1954. The rest of his career, which lasted from 1948 to 1960, was spent in the minor leagues. Hassard was born in Lloydminster, Saskatchewan and raised in Toronto, Ontario. His wife, Helen, died in 2009, and they had a son, Bill, a Leaf draft pick in 1974, as well as two daughters, Kim and Jacqui. He was a long-time resident and coach in Stouffville, Ontario. He died in December 2010.

== Playing career ==
Bob Hassard played junior hockey with the Toronto Marlboros and won the Allan Cup with the team in the 1949–50 season. The same year he broke into the NHL, playing a single game for the Toronto Maple Leafs. Also a baseball player, the Brooklyn Dodgers offered him $100 a month to play for their farm team. Hassard turned down the offer, figuring he could earn more as a hockey player.

He shifted between the NHL and AHL throughout most of his career, winning a championship with the AHL's Pittsburgh Hornets in 1951–1952, and again in 1954=1955. In 129 NHL games Hassard recorded 9 goals, 28 assists (37 points), and only 22 penalty minutes.

He won the Stanley Cup in 1951 with the Toronto Maple Leafs.

== Career statistics ==
=== Regular season and playoffs ===
			Regular season					Playoffs
Season	Team	League	GP	G	A	Pts	PIM	GP	G	A	Pts	PIM
1945–46	Toronto Marlboros	OHA	23	4	8	12	6	4	2	3	5	0
1946–47	Toronto Marlboros	OHA	17	9	16	25	7	2	1	1	2	0
1946–47	Toronto Dorsts	TMHL	12	14	16	30	2	12	14	15	29	8
1947–48	Toronto Marlboros	OHA	31	19	16	35	18	—	—	—	—	—
1947–48	Toronto Marlboros	OHA Sr	4	3	0	3	0	5	1	1	2	2
1948–49	Toronto Marlboros	OHA	35	33	36	69	28	1	1	0	1	0
1948–49	Toronto Marlboros	OHA Sr	1	0	1	1	0	—	—	—	—	—
1949–50	Toronto Maple Leafs	NHL	1	0	0	0	0	—	—	—	—	—
1949–50	Toronto Marlboros	OHA Sr	41	12	21	33	22	14	3	10	13	4
1949–50	Toronto Marlboros	Al-Cup	—	—	—	—	—	17	7	16	23	14
1950–51	Toronto Maple Leafs	NHL	12	0	1	1	0	—	—	—	—	—
1950–51	Toronto Marlboros	OHA Sr	28	19	17	36	12	—	—	—	—	—
1951–52	Pittsburgh Hornets	AHL	67	18	46	64	36	11	5	5	10	10
1952–53	Toronto Maple Leafs	NHL	70	8	23	31	14	—	—	—	—	—
1953–54	Toronto Maple Leafs	NHL	26	1	4	5	4	—	—	—	—	—
1953–54	Pittsburgh Hornets	AHL	46	15	24	39	44	5	3	1	4	8
1954–55	Chicago Black Hawks	NHL	17	0	0	0	4	—	—	—	—	—
1954–55	Pittsburgh Hornets	AHL	39	9	16	25	38	10	7	1	8	8
1955–56	Pittsburgh Hornets	AHL	64	22	48	70	47	4	1	3	4	4
1956–57	Buffalo Bisons	AHL	61	12	19	31	20	—	—	—	—	—
1957–58	Buffalo Bisons	AHL	70	14	31	45	13	—	—	—	—	—
1958–59	Whitby Dunlops	OHA Sr	23	11	23	34	6	10	6	5	11	4
1958–69	Whitby Dunlops	Al-Cup	—	—	—	—	—	12	5	4	9	4
1959–60	Whitby Dunlops	OHA Sr	43	15	23	38	16	11	2	4	6	2
AHL totals			347	90	184	274	198	30	16	10	26	30
NHL totals			126	9	28	37	22	—	—	—	—	—
