= Ross Lowe =

Canadian ice hockey player

- Born: September 21, 1928 Oshawa, Ontario, Canada
- Died: August 14, 1955 (aged 26) Haliburton, Ontario, Canada
- Height: 6 ft 2 in (188 cm)
- Weight: 180 lb (82 kg; 12 st 12 lb)
- Position: Defence/Left wing
- Shot: Right
- Played for: Montreal Canadiens; Boston Bruins
- Playing career: 1948–1955

Ross Robert Lowe (September 21, 1928 in Oshawa, Ontario – August 14, 1955) was a Canadian professional ice hockey player who played three seasons in the National Hockey League from 1949 to 1952 for the Boston Bruins and Montreal Canadiens.

Lowe scored his first NHL goal on November 15, 1950, as a member of the Boston Bruins in his team's 4–3 win over the New York Rangers at Madison Square Garden.

Lowe played 77 career NHL games, scoring six goals and eight assists for fourteen points. In his last professional season, he played for the Springfield Indians of the American Hockey League and managed to score 82 points in only 60 games, which earned him the Les Cunningham Award as league MVP. Ross signed with the New York Rangers but never made it to training camp as he drowned that off-season in Lake Haliburton while vacationing with his family.

== Career statistics ==
=== Regular season and playoffs ===
			Regular season					Playoffs
Season	Team	League	GP	G	A	Pts	PIM	GP	G	A	Pts	PIM
1944–45	Oshawa Generals	OHA	17	3	0	3	20	3	1	1	2	0
1945–46	Oshawa Generals	OHA	23	19	10	29	40	12	9	7	16	13
1946–47	Oshawa Generals	OHA	13	5	4	9	11	5	2	0	2	2
1947–48	Oshawa Generals	OHA	36	21	16	37	80	6	1	2	3	30
1948–49	Hershey Bears	AHL	43	4	7	11	55	11	0	0	0	2
1949–50	Boston Bruins	NHL	3	0	0	0	0	—	—	—	—	—
1949–50	Hershey Bears	AHL	57	7	15	22	76	—	—	—	—	—
1950–51	Boston Bruins	NHL	43	5	3	8	40	—	—	—	—	—
1950–51	Hershey Bears	AHL	10	1	3	4	28	—	—	—	—	—
1950–51	Buffalo Bisons	AHL	15	4	2	6	29	4	0	0	0	17
1950–51	Montreal Canadiens	NHL	—	—	—	—	—	2	0	0	0	)
1951–52	Montreal Canadiens	NHL	31	1	5	6	42	—	—	—	—	—
1952–53	Buffalo Bisons	AHL	43	5	15	20	53	—	—	—	—	—
1953–54	Vancouver Canucks	WHL	66	15	23	38	101	5	0	1	1	10
1954–55	Springfield Indians	AHL	60	32	50	82	91	4	1	2	3	16
AHL totals			228	53	92	145	332	19	1	2	3	35
NHL totals			77	6	8	14	82	2	0	0	0	0

== See also ==
- List of ice hockey players who died during their playing career
