= Bill Barilko =

Canadian ice hockey player (1927–1951)

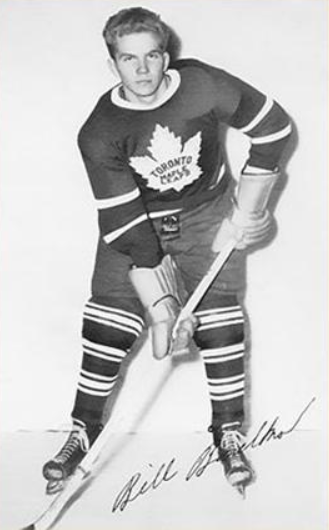
- Born: March 25, 1927 Timmins, Ontario, Canada
- Died: c. August 26, 1951 (aged 24) Unorganized Cochrane District, Ontario, Canada
- Height: 5 ft 11 in (180 cm)
- Weight: 180 lb (82 kg; 12 st 12 lb)
- Position: Defence
- Shot: Right
- Played for: Hollywood Wolves (PCHL); Toronto Maple Leafs
- Playing career: 1945–1951

William "Bashin' Bill" Barilko (March 25, 1927 – c. August 26, 1951) was a Canadian ice hockey player who played his entire National Hockey League (NHL) career for the Toronto Maple Leafs. Over five seasons, Barilko won the Stanley Cup four times in 1947, 1948, 1949, and 1951. His last goal is one of the most famous in NHL history, winning the 1951 Stanley Cup for the Maple Leafs in overtime. Barilko died in August 1951 in a floatplane crash during a fishing trip to Quebec, his remains not found until 1962. He was the subject of the 1993 single "Fifty Mission Cap" by The Tragically Hip.

== Personal life ==
Barilko was born in March 1927 in Timmins, Ontario to parents Steve and Faye Barilko (nee Feodosia Karpinchuk) of Ukrainian descent. Steve and Faye were immigrants from Poland, Steve arriving in Canada in 1910, Faye arriving in Canada in 1924. Three weeks after Faye arrived in Halifax, Steve and Faye were married in Timmins, likely an arranged marriage, according to daughter Anne. Bill was one of three children, with brother Alex, and sister Anne.

Bill's brother Alex also played professional hockey in the Pacific Coast Hockey League (PCHL), Bill playing for Hollywood Wolves and Alex for Oakland Oaks. The two recorded a 78rpm recording greeting for their mother Faye while in Hollywood, the only known recording of Bill's voice. At the time of his death, he had "promised himself", giving a ring to Louise Hastings.

== Professional career ==
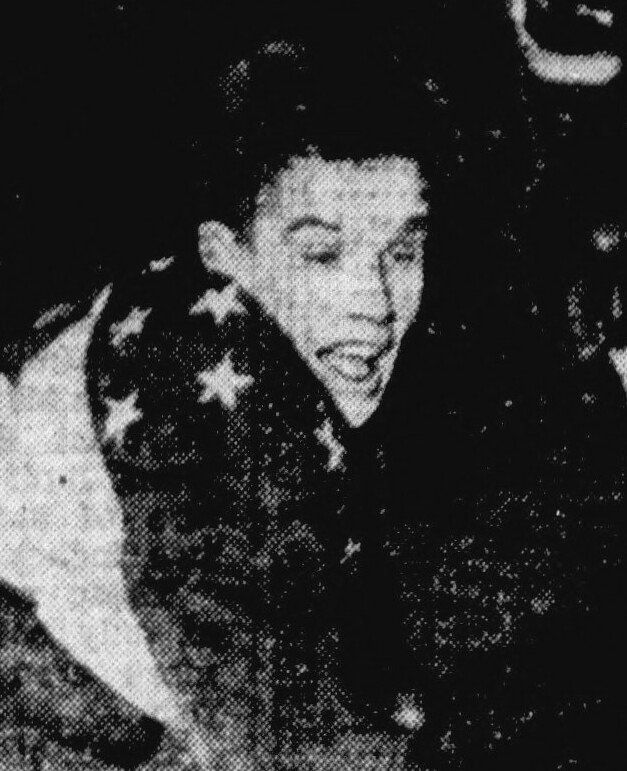
Barilko in 1945

Barilko played junior ice hockey while also working in the Delnite mine. He was signed by the Toronto Maple Leafs and assigned to their affiliate the PCHL's Hollywood Wolves. Under coach Tommy Anderson, a former NHL defenceman, at Hollywood, he learned how to hit and hit hard. He played most of two seasons in Hollywood, nicknamed "Billy The Kid."

In February 1947, Bill was called up to the Toronto Maple Leafs on an emergency basis. In a brash move, when he first met team owner Conn Smythe he is quoted by team-mate Allan Stanley as saying "Your troubles are over." Barilko stayed in Toronto for the rest of his career. "Don't worry about The Kid.", he said, "They're not chasing The Kid back to Hollywood. I like this big-time stuff." He became a popular player, described as tall, blue-eyed and handsome, and described as "[having] a build like Johnny Weismuller", "the Timmins kid with the Atlas build and the toothpaste ad smile," and 'the wavy-haired blonde with the wandering hip."

He was assigned sweater #21 when he debuted for the Leafs. He changed to #19 for the 1948–49 and 1949–50 seasons. The #5 (which was retired by the Leafs) was worn by Barilko for only one season, 1950–51. During that span of five seasons, Barilko and the Toronto Maple Leafs were Stanley Cup champions on four occasions: 1947, 1948, 1949, and 1951.

On April 21, 1951, Barilko scored what is considered one of the most memorable goals in NHL history. During overtime of game five of the 1951 Stanley Cup Final, his team-mate Howie Meeker passed the puck from behind the net out front where Barilko, a defenceman, found it and back-handed it past the Montreal Canadiens' netminder Gerry McNeil. The goal was the series-winning goal and the last goal he ever scored.

According to Meeker, Barilko would have been a Hall of Famer, having rushing skills, was good with the puck, and tough: "When he hit you, everything hurt". According to Stanley, the Leafs system at the time was "like a meat grinder" with Bill waiting to "bash you" as you entered their defensive zone. According to another team-mate Cal Gardner, he would warn opposing forwards: "He'd say 'boop ... boop' as he hit them." Barilko had offensive skills at a time when defencemen did not advance into the offensive zone. He was admonished several times by Smythe about his rushes up ice and was threatened with a CA$500 (equivalent to $5,949 in 2025) fine. According to his sister Anne, Barilko said to Smythe after the winning goal "Do you still want to fine me $500?".

== Disappearance and death ==
In August 1951, Barilko was visiting his family in Timmins. While there, he accepted an invitation from his dentist, Henry Hudson to fly to Rupert House on James Bay in northern Quebec for a weekend fishing trip, flying on Hudson's Fairchild 24W46 CF-FXT floatplane. Barilko accepted the invitation despite the misgivings of his mother Fay who did not want him to fly off to "that wild bush country" and leave on a Friday, a day that Fay considered bad luck. The two set off on August 24, a Friday. After their fishing, the two set off on August 26 on the return trip to Porcupine Lake during a storm, and the single-engine plane went missing.

A massive search was organized. The Royal Canadian Air Force organized a search that covered 78,000 km^{2} (30,000 mi^{2}) and involved 38 RCAF planes and 270 personnel. By the time it was called off, it had cost CA$385,000 (equivalent to $4,580,942 in 2025) over its two months. At the time, it was the most expensive search in Canadian military history. The dentist's brother continued the search on his own over the next eleven years, investigating leads. Smythe and the Maple Leaf Gardens organized the search and Smythe used his influence with former Ontario Premier George A. Drew to expand the search.

Still officially missing at the beginning of the 1951-52 NHL season pre-season, the Maple Leafs prepared his hockey equipment as usual for training camp. The team left his locker untouched that season.

Eleven years later, on June 1, 1962, pilot Gary Fields spotted some wreckage in the Cochrane District while on a routine flight. Investigating the report, on June 7, 1962 helicopter pilot Ron Boyd and helicopter engineer Phil Weston found the wreckage of the plane for the Ontario government Ministry of Lands and Forests. The wreck was located about 100 kilometres (62 mi) north of Cochrane, Ontario, about 56 km (35 mi) off course. The two dropped rolls of toilet paper around the site and marked it on a map. The two then landed nearby in a makeshift landing spot and hiked to the site. They found the remains of the two occupants still strapped in their seats. The wreckage was half-buried in the muskeg. The two took photographs of the wreckage and guided Ministry officials to the site.

The cause of the crash was deemed to have been a combination of pilot inexperience, poor weather, and overloaded cargo. It was determined that the plane had crashed straight-down, likely having ran out of fuel and stalled. The wreckage was left on site, and not removed until 2011, to be moved to Timmins.

== Honours ==
Barilko was a member of four Stanley Cup championship teams with the Maple Leafs in 1947, 1948, 1949, and 1951. As a member of the Stanley Cup champions, Barilko played in the 1947, 1948 and 1949 NHL All-Star Game, scoring a goal in the 1949 game.

Barilko's #5 jersey was retired by the Maple Leafs. Until October 15, 2016, Barilko's #5 was one of only two numbers retired by the Maple Leafs (Ace Bailey's #6 was the other).

Barilko was honoured again by the Maple Leafs on March 19, 2011, on what would have been his 83rd birthday. A pre-game ceremony at the Air Canada Centre unveiled a new banner. His sister Anne attended, speaking about his story.

Barilko's skates from the 1951-52 season, and the puck of the Stanley Cup-winning goal are in the possession of the Hockey Hall of Fame in Toronto. After the winning goal, referee Bill Chadwick retrieved the goal from the Montreal net and flipped it to disabled spectator Jimmy Main (a Gardens regular who was well-known) behind the net, saying "Here Jimmy, give this to your mother". Main did not keep the puck, giving it to his cousin George Fletcher, saying "give it to Aunt Annie". Fletcher kept it until 1985 and then donated it to the Hall.

== In media ==
Barilko's story has been published in two books - the 1988 book Overtime, Overdue: The Bill Barilko Story, by John Melady, and the 2004 book Barilko — Without A Trace, by Kevin Shea.

In 2017, TSN aired the short documentary film The Mission, profiling a project to recover the remaining wreckage of Barilko's plane; the film took its title from "Fifty Mission Cap", and it thematically touched on the song's role in Barilko's story. The film received a Canadian Screen Award nomination for Best Sports Feature Segment at the 6th Canadian Screen Awards in 2018. Frozen in Time: The Bill Barilko Story, a documentary film directed by Steve Paikin, entered production in 2026.

=== "Fifty Mission Cap" ===
The 1993 song "Fifty Mission Cap" by The Tragically Hip is about Barilko's death and the Leafs' subsequent Stanley Cup drought. The song has been credited as singlehandedly reviving Barilko's fame after he had lapsed into semi-obscurity; the song remains a staple part of the Leafs' warm-up playlist at every home game, and the Leafs have a framed, handwritten copy of Gord Downie's lyrics to the song in their private players' lounge. Whenever the band played the Air Canada Centre] Barilko's retired-number banner was always left in place during the concert, and when Downie died on October 17, 2017, the team incorporated Barilko's banner into its Downie tribute.

== Career statistics ==
| | | | Regular season | | | | | Playoffs |
| Season | Team | League | GP | G | A | Pts | PIM | GP | G | A | Pts | PIM |
|---|---|---|---|---|---|---|---|---|---|---|---|---|
| 1943–44 | Holman Pluggers | NOHA | — | — | — | — | — | — | — | — | — | — |
| 1944–45 | Timmins Canadians | NOHA | — | — | — | — | — | — | — | — | — | — |
| 1944–45 | Porcupine Combines | NOHA | — | 3 | 2 | 5 | 8 | — | — | — | — | — |
| 1945–46 | Hollywood Wolves | PCHL | 38 | 4 | 5 | 9 | 103 | 12 | 2 | 3 | 5 | 26 |
| 1946–47 | Toronto Maple Leafs | NHL | 18 | 3 | 7 | 10 | 33 | 11 | 0 | 3 | 3 | 18 |
| 1946–47 | Hollywood Wolves | PCHL | 47 | 9 | 2 | 11 | 69 | — | — | — | — | — |
| 1947–48 | Toronto Maple Leafs | NHL | 57 | 5 | 9 | 14 | 147 | 9 | 1 | 0 | 1 | 17 |
| 1948–49 | Toronto Maple Leafs | NHL | 60 | 5 | 4 | 9 | 95 | 9 | 0 | 1 | 1 | 20 |
| 1949–50 | Toronto Maple Leafs | NHL | 59 | 7 | 10 | 17 | 85 | 7 | 1 | 1 | 2 | 18 |
| 1950–51 | Toronto Maple Leafs | NHL | 58 | 6 | 6 | 12 | 96 | 11 | 3 | 2 | 5 | 31 |
| NHL totals | | | 252 | 26 | 36 | 62 | 456 | 47 | 5 | 7 | 12 | 104 |

== See also ==
- List of fatalities from aviation accidents
- List of ice hockey players who died during their playing career
- List of NHL retired numbers
- List of solved missing person cases: 1950–1999
- Lists of sportspeople who died during their careers
- List of Stanley Cup Final overtime series winners
- Sports-related curses
