= Tod Sloan (ice hockey) =

Canadian ice hockey player

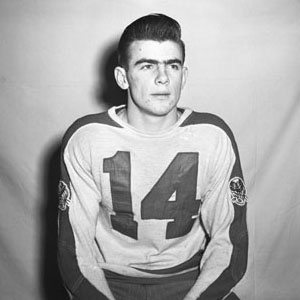
- Born: November 30, 1927 Litchfield, Quebec, Canada
- Died: July 12, 2017 (aged 89) Newmarket, Ontario, Canada
- Height: 5 ft 10 in (178 cm)
- Weight: 152 lb (69 kg; 10 st 12 lb)
- Position: Centre/Right Wing
- Shot: Right
- Played for: Toronto Maple Leafs; Chicago Black Hawks
- National team: Canada
- Playing career: 1946–1962

Aloysius Martin "Tod" Sloan (November 30, 1927 – July 12, 2017) was a Canadian professional ice hockey player. He played in the National Hockey League (NHL) for the Toronto Maple Leafs and Chicago Black Hawks. He was a member of three Stanley Cup championship teams: 1949 and 1951 in Toronto, and 1961 in Chicago. Sloan was born in Litchfield, Quebec, but grew up in Falconbridge, Ontario.

== Career ==
Sloan played junior hockey with the St. Michael's Majors. He began his professional career with the Pittsburgh Hornets of the American Hockey League in the 1946–47 season and was called up for one game by the Toronto Maple Leafs in 1947–48. In 1948–49, Sloan played 29 regular-season games with Toronto; he did not play in the playoffs and his name was left off the Stanley Cup, but he appeared in the Maple Leafs' 1949 team picture. He played eight full seasons for the Leafs and won the Stanley Cup with them in 1949 and 1951.

In 1958, Sloan and teammate Jimmy Thomson were traded from Toronto to Chicago because of their activities in organizing the National Hockey League Players' Association. Sloan played three seasons for the Black Hawks and won the Stanley Cup with them in 1961. His name was incorrectly engraved on the Cup as "Martin A. Sloan".

Sloan retired from professional ice hockey in 1961. The following season, he joined the Galt Terriers senior team and played with the Canadian national ice hockey team in the 1962 IIHF world championship before retiring completely from competitive ice hockey.

Sloan was a cousin of Dave Keon, another longtime member of the Maple Leafs. He lived in Sutton, Ontario, in his final years and died in Newmarket, Ontario, on July 12, 2017, at the age of 89.

== Awards ==
- 1946 - OHA-Jr. MVP
- 1951, 1952, 1956 - Played in NHL All-Star Game
- 1956 - NHL Second All-Star Team
- 1956 - J.P. Bickell Memorial Award

Source: Hockey Hall of Fame

== Career statistics ==
			Regular season					Playoffs
Season	Team	League	GP	G	A	Pts	PIM	GP	G	A	Pts	PIM
1943–44	Copper Cliff Reps	NOJHA	—	—	—	—	—	—	—	—	—	—
1944–45	Toronto St. Michael's Majors	OHA-Jr.	19	21	16	37	14	9	10	10	20	0
1944–45	Toronto St. Michael's Majors	M-Cup	—	—	—	—	—	14	17	4	21	32
1945–46	Toronto St. Michael's Majors	OHA-Jr.	25	43	32	75	49	11	16	6	22	16
1946–47	Pittsburgh Hornets	AHL	64	15	24	39	31	12	2	2	4	0
1947–48	Toronto Maple Leafs	NHL	1	0	0	0	0	—	—	—	—	—
1947–48	Pittsburgh Hornets	AHL	61	20	24	44	18	2	1	0	1	2
1948–49	Toronto Maple Leafs	NHL	29	3	4	7	0	—	—	—	—	—
1949–50	Cleveland Barons	AHL	62	27	39	66	28	9	10	4	14	7
1950–51	Toronto Maple Leafs	NHL	70	31	25	56	105	11	4	5	9	18
1951–52	Toronto Maple Leafs	NHL	68	25	23	48	89	4	0	0	0	10
1952–53	Toronto Maple Leafs	NHL	70	15	10	25	76	—	—	—	—	—
1953–54	Toronto Maple Leafs	NHL	67	11	32	43	100	5	1	1	2	4
1954–55	Toronto Maple Leafs	NHL	63	13	15	28	89	4	0	0	0	2
1955–56	Toronto Maple Leafs	NHL	70	37	29	66	100	2	0	0	0	5
1956–57	Toronto Maple Leafs	NHL	52	14	21	35	33	—	—	—	—	—
1957–58	Toronto Maple Leafs	NHL	59	13	25	38	58	—	—	—	—	—
1958–59	Chicago Black Hawks	NHL	59	27	35	62	79	6	3	5	8	0
1959–60	Chicago Black Hawks	NHL	70	20	20	40	54	3	0	0	0	0
1960–61	Chicago Black Hawks	NHL	67	11	23	34	48	12	1	1	2	8
1961–62	Galt Terriers	OHA-Sr.	9	11	4	15	8	—	—	—	—	—
NHL totals			745	220	262	482	831	47	9	12	21	47
