= Joe Klukay =

Canadian ice hockey player

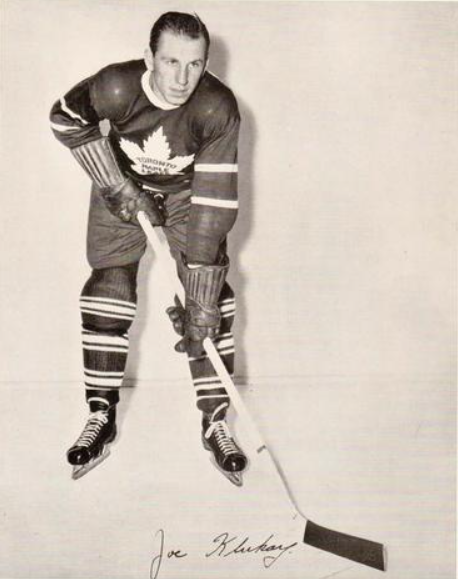
- Klukay in 1940s card
- Born: November 6, 1922 Sault Ste. Marie, Ontario, Canada
- Died: February 3, 2006 (aged 83) Royal Oak, Michigan, U.S.
- Height: 6 ft 0 in (183 cm)
- Weight: 182 lb (83 kg; 13 st 0 lb)
- Position: Left wing
- Shot: Left
- Played for: NHL; Toronto Maple Leafs; Boston Bruins; AHL; Pittsburgh Hornets; OHASr; Windsor Bulldogs
- Playing career: 1942–1962

Joseph Francis Klukay a.k.a. "The Duke of Padocah" (November 6, 1922 – February 3, 2006) was a professional Canadian ice hockey forward. He was born in Sault Ste. Marie, Ontario.

Klukay began his National Hockey League career with the Toronto Maple Leafs in 1943. He also played for the Boston Bruins. He left the NHL following the 1956 season and played several more years in the OHA Senior A League with the Windsor Bulldogs before retiring from hockey altogether in 1964. In his career, he won 4 Stanley Cups and 1 Allan Cup. Klukay was the first Sault Ste. Marie native to play in the NHL All Star Game, doing so with the Maple Leafs during the first three official installments from 1947-1949.

== Awards and achievements ==
- 1947 Stanley Cup Championship (Toronto)
- 1948 Stanley Cup Championship (Toronto)
- 1949 Stanley Cup Championship (Toronto)
- 1951 Stanley Cup Championship (Toronto)
- 1963 Allan Cup Championship (Windsor)

== Career statistics ==
=== Regular season and playoffs ===
			Regular season					Playoffs
Season	Team	League	GP	G	A	Pts	PIM	GP	G	A	Pts	PIM
1941–42	Sault Ste. Marie Greyhounds	NOJHA	—	—	—	—	—	—	—	—	—	—
1942–43	Stratford Kroehlers	OHA	14	11	18	29	11	2	4	4	8	0
1942–43	Toronto Maple Leafs	NHL	—	—	—	—	—	1	0	0	0	0
1943–44	Toronto Navy	OHA-Sr.	25	14	13	27	19	—	—	—	—	—
1944–45	Cornwallis Navy	NSDHL	13	8	4	12	8	3	3	3	6	6
1945–46	Pittsburgh Hornets	AHL	57	26	23	49	20	6	4	1	5	2
1946–47	Toronto Maple Leafs	NHL	55	9	20	29	12	11	1	0	1	0
1947–48	Toronto Maple Leafs	NHL	59	15	15	30	28	9	1	1	2	2
1948–49	Toronto Maple Leafs	NHL	45	11	10	21	11	9	2	3	5	4
1949–50	Toronto Maple Leafs	NHL	70	15	16	31	19	7	3	0	3	4
1950–51	Toronto Maple Leafs	NHL	70	14	16	30	16	11	4	3	7	0
1951–52	Toronto Maple Leafs	NHL	43	4	8	12	6	4	1	1	2	0
1952–53	Boston Bruins	NHL	70	13	16	29	20	11	1	2	3	9
1953–54	Boston Bruins	NHL	70	20	17	37	27	4	0	0	0	0
1954–55	Toronto Maple Leafs	NHL	56	8	8	16	44	4	0	0	0	4
1955–56	Toronto Maple Leafs	NHL	18	0	1	1	2	—	—	—	—	—
1955–56	Pittsburgh Hornets	AHL	47	24	26	50	40	4	4	1	5	8
1956–57	Windsor Bulldogs	OHA-Sr.	52	23	30	53	80	12	6	4	10	9
1957–58	Windsor Bulldogs	NOHA	57	10	27	37	33	13	1	9	10	11
1958–59	Windsor Bulldogs	NOHA	49	21	21	42	25	—	—	—	—	—
1960–61	Windsor Bulldogs	OHA-Sr.	33	12	37	49	10	—	—	—	—	—
1961–62	Windsor Bulldogs	OHA-Sr.	33	12	20	32	32	13	1	7	8	6
1962–63	Windsor Bulldogs	OHA-Sr.	12	3	9	12	2	10	1	7	8	2
1962–63	Windsor Bulldogs	Al-Cup	—	—	—	—	—	10	3	8	11	12
1963–64	Windsor Bulldogs	IHL	1	0	1	1	0	—	—	—	—	—
NHL totals			566	109	127	236	189	71	13	10	23	23
