= Fleming Mackell =

Canadian ice hockey player

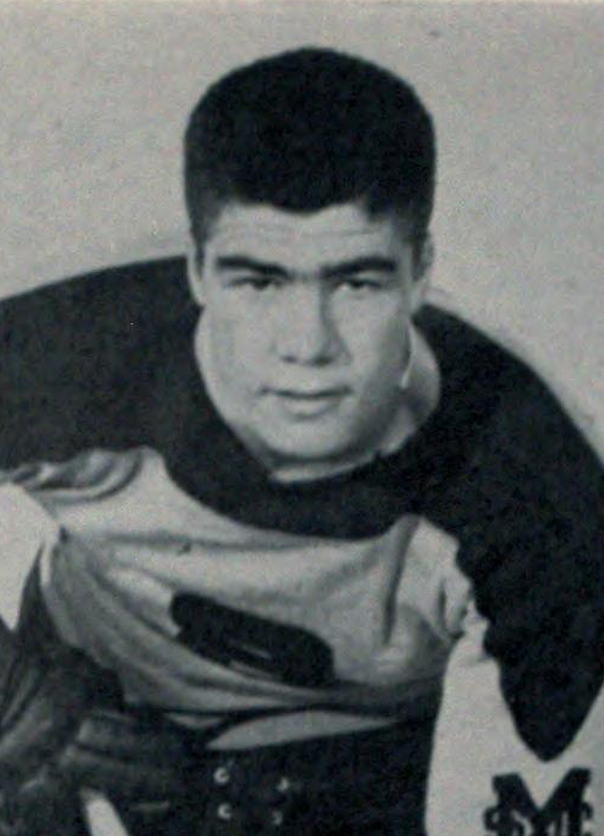
- Mackell, c. 1947
- Born: April 30, 1929 Montreal, Quebec, Canada
- Died: October 19, 2015 (aged 86) Hawkesbury, Ontario, Canada
- Height: 5 ft 7 in (170 cm)
- Weight: 156 lb (71 kg; 11 st 2 lb)
- Position: Centre
- Shot: Left
- Played for: Toronto Maple Leafs; Boston Bruins
- Playing career: 1944–1968

Fleming David Mackell (April 30, 1929 – October 19, 2015) was a Canadian ice hockey forward who played with two Stanley Cup winners in his 13-season National Hockey League career.

== Playing career ==
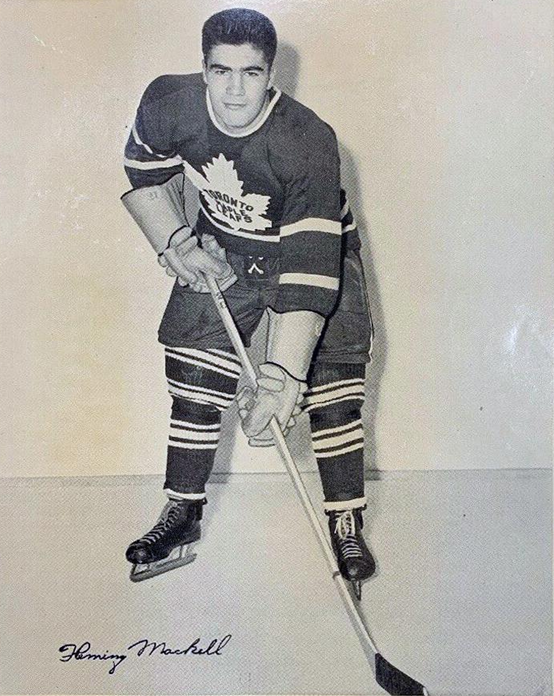
Late 1940s card of Mackell for Toronto Maple Leafs

After a stage with St-Michaels, the Toronto Maple Leafs OHA affiliate, Mackell began his NHL career with the Toronto Maple Leafs in 1948. The majority of it was spent with the Boston Bruins, with whom he would retire following the 1960 season. Mackell won Stanley Cups with the Maple Leafs in 1949 and 1951.

After his second Stanley Cup success, Mackell was traded by Toronto to the Boston Bruins in return for young defenceman Jim Morrison. In Boston, he attained NHL First All-Star Team status for the 1952–53 season, at the position of centre, playing on a line composed of Ed Sanford and Johnny Peirson. Mackell also won the Elizabeth C. Dufresne Trophy in 1953, awarded annually to the outstanding Bruins player on Boston Gardens home ice. He was named an alternate captain of the Boston Bruins in 1955. Flem Mackell became a mainstay and catalyst of Boston's strong and prolific offence of the late 1950s.

In 1956–57, Mackell centred a line composed of veteran iron man Cal Gardner and Rookie Of the year, Calder trophy winner Larry Regan. Along with later Bruins linemate, Don McKenney, Mackell led all scorers during the 1957-58 Stanley Cup playoffs. In the spring of 1959, Fleming Mackell led the Boston Bruins against the New York Rangers on an exhibition tour of Europe. A rugged, hard-charging playmaker with a razor-sharp skating style, he was a side of the net scoring specialist. The versatile Mackell frequently played at left wing, principally with Don McKenney and Jerry Toppazzini, a trio whose production matched the output of the vaunted UKE Line, along with his regular position at centre. Mackell often assumed a defensive checking role, he was the catalyst of the short-lived Hustle line in 1959–60.

Upon his retirement from the Boston Bruins and the NHL at the conclusion of the 1959–60 season, MacKell briefly became player/coach for the Quebec Aces of the AHL in 1960–61. He approached the Detroit Red Wings for a tryout in September 1961 and appeared in some exhibition games, but did not make the club.

Mackell is the son of former NHL player Jack Mackell of the original Ottawa Senators. His daughter JoAnne is an established country rock singer based in Toronto. Mackell died on October 19, 2015.

In 2023 he would be named one of the top 100 Bruins players of all time.

== Career statistics ==
| | | | Regular season | | | | | Playoffs |
| Season | Team | League | GP | G | A | Pts | PIM | GP | G | A | Pts | PIM |
|---|---|---|---|---|---|---|---|---|---|---|---|---|
| 1944–45 | Montreal Jr. Royals | QJHL | 9 | 3 | 4 | 7 | 0 | 6 | 2 | 3 | 5 | 2 |
| 1945–46 | Toronto St. Michael's Majors | OHA-Jr. | 24 | 25 | 25 | 50 | 29 | 11 | 13 | 9 | 22 | 52 |
| 1946–47 | Toronto St. Michael's Majors | OHA-Jr. | 28 | 49 | 33 | 82 | 71 | 9 | 10 | 10 | 20 | 33 |
| 1946–47 | Toronto St. Michael's Majors | M-Cup | — | — | — | — | — | 10 | 15 | 14 | 29 | 38 |
| 1947–48 | Toronto Maple Leafs | NHL | 3 | 0 | 0 | 0 | 2 | — | — | — | — | — |
| 1947–48 | Pittsburgh Hornets | AHL | 62 | 22 | 43 | 65 | 84 | 2 | 1 | 0 | 1 | 4 |
| 1948–49 | Toronto Maple Leafs | NHL | 11 | 1 | 1 | 2 | 6 | 9 | 2 | 4 | 6 | 4 |
| 1948–49 | Pittsburgh Hornets | AHL | 52 | 38 | 38 | 76 | 65 | — | — | — | — | — |
| 1949–50 | Toronto Maple Leafs | NHL | 36 | 7 | 13 | 20 | 24 | 7 | 1 | 1 | 2 | 11 |
| 1949–50 | Pittsburgh Hornets | AHL | 36 | 22 | 25 | 47 | 62 | — | — | — | — | — |
| 1950–51 | Toronto Maple Leafs | NHL | 70 | 12 | 13 | 25 | 40 | 11 | 2 | 3 | 5 | 9 |
| 1951–52 | Toronto Maple Leafs | NHL | 32 | 2 | 8 | 10 | 16 | — | — | — | — | — |
| 1951–52 | Boston Bruins | NHL | 30 | 1 | 8 | 9 | 24 | 5 | 2 | 1 | 3 | 12 |
| 1952–53 | Boston Bruins | NHL | 65 | 27 | 17 | 44 | 63 | 11 | 2 | 7 | 9 | 7 |
| 1953–54 | Boston Bruins | NHL | 67 | 15 | 32 | 47 | 60 | 4 | 1 | 1 | 2 | 8 |
| 1954–55 | Boston Bruins | NHL | 60 | 11 | 24 | 35 | 76 | 4 | 0 | 1 | 1 | 0 |
| 1955–56 | Boston Bruins | NHL | 52 | 7 | 9 | 16 | 59 | — | — | — | — | — |
| 1956–57 | Boston Bruins | NHL | 65 | 22 | 17 | 39 | 73 | 10 | 5 | 3 | 8 | 4 |
| 1957–58 | Boston Bruins | NHL | 70 | 20 | 40 | 60 | 72 | 12 | 5 | 14 | 19 | 12 |
| 1958–59 | Boston Bruins | NHL | 57 | 17 | 23 | 40 | 28 | 7 | 2 | 6 | 8 | 8 |
| 1959–60 | Boston Bruins | NHL | 47 | 7 | 15 | 22 | 19 | — | — | — | — | — |
| 1960–61 | Quebec Aces | AHL | 62 | 13 | 22 | 35 | 54 | — | — | — | — | — |
| 1962–63 | Los Angeles Blades | WHL | 29 | 10 | 21 | 31 | 26 | 3 | 1 | 1 | 2 | 2 |
| 1963–64 | New Glasgow Rangers | NSSHL | 7 | 5 | 14 | 19 | 4 | 4 | 2 | 2 | 4 | 4 |
| 1964–65 | New Glasgow Rangers | NSSHL | 57 | 49 | 75 | 124 | 85 | — | — | — | — | — |
| 1965–66 | St. Hyacinthe Saints | Que-Sr. | 20 | 10 | 10 | 20 | 29 | 12 | 5 | 9 | 14 | 8 |
| 1967–68 | St. John's Capitals | Nfld-Sr. | 33 | 11 | 19 | 30 | 53 | — | — | — | — | — |
| NHL totals | | | 665 | 149 | 220 | 369 | 562 | 80 | 22 | 41 | 63 | 75 |
