= 1952–53 NHL transactions =

Transactions In The NHL 1952-1953

The following is a list of all team-to-team transactions that have occurred in the National Hockey League (NHL) during the 1952–53 NHL season. It lists which team each player has been traded to and for which player(s) or other consideration(s), if applicable.

== Transactions ==
July 22, 1952	To Detroit Red Wings cash	To Chicago Black Hawks Sid Abel
August 14, 1952	To Detroit Red Wings cash	To Chicago Black Hawks Fred Glover; Enio Sclisizzi
August 14, 1952	To Boston Bruins cash	To Chicago Black Hawks Ed Kryzanowski
August 18, 1952	To Detroit Red Wings Jim Morrison; Reg Sinclair cash	To New York Rangers Leo Reise Jr.
September 11, 1952	To Toronto Maple Leafs Harry Lumley	To Chicago Black Hawks Cal Gardner; Ray Hannigan; Gus Mortson; Al Rollins
September 16, 1952	To Toronto Maple Leafs cash	To Boston Bruins Joe Klukay
September 22, 1952	To Montreal Canadiens cash	To Chicago Black Hawks Gerry Couture
September 23, 1952	To Detroit Red Wings Red Almas; Guyle Fielder; Steve Hrymnak	To Chicago Black Hawks cash
October 8, 1952	To Montreal Canadiens rights to Frank Eddolls	To New York Rangers cash
October 15, 1952	To Detroit Red Wings loan of Ray Hannigan for 1952–53 season	To Chicago Black Hawks loan of Guyle Fielder for 1952–53 season
October 31, 1952	To Boston Bruins Ed Kryzanowski	To Chicago Black Hawks cash
January 9, 1953	To Chicago Black Hawks cash	To New York Rangers rights to Pete Babando
