= 1952–53 Chicago Black Hawks season =

NHL ice hockey team season

1952–53 Chicago Black Hawks
- League: 4th NHL
- 1952–53 record: 27–28–15
- Home record: 14–11–10
- Road record: 13–17–5
- Goals for: 169
- Goals against: 175

Team information
- General manager: Bill Tobin
- Coach: Sid Abel
- Captain: Bill Gadsby
- Arena: Chicago Stadium

Team leaders
- Goals: Jim McFadden (23)
- Assists: Cal Gardner (24)
- Points: Jim McFadden (44)
- Penalty minutes: George Gee (99)
- Wins: Al Rollins (27)
- Goals against average: Al Rollins (2.50)

The 1952–53 Chicago Black Hawks season was the team's 27th season in the NHL, and they were coming off of two consecutive seasons of finishing in last place in the six team NHL. The Black Hawks had a record of 17–44–9 in 1951–52, missing the playoffs for the sixth straight season. In 1952–53, the Black Hawks qualified for the playoffs, losing in the first round to the Montreal Canadiens.

== Off-season ==
In the off-season, the Black Hawks and Toronto Maple Leafs completed a trade which sent Harry Lumley to Toronto for Al Rollins, Cal Gardner and Gus Mortson. Chicago also fired head coach Ebbie Goodfellow, and replaced him with Sid Abel, who would be a player-coach. Abel would name defenceman Bill Gadsby as the new team captain.

Chicago also saw a change in ownership, as Arthur Wirtz and James D. Norris took over the struggling and near bankrupt franchise.

== Regular season ==
The Black Hawks started the season off strong, sitting with a 10–5–3 record in their first 18 games, however, the club would fall into a slump, and went 2–7–5 in their next 14 games to fall to .500. Chicago would continue to hover around the .500 for the rest of the season, battling with the Toronto Maple Leafs and Boston Bruins for the final playoff spot. Going into the final weekend of the season, Chicago would earn big wins against the Detroit Red Wings and New York Rangers to clinch the fourth and final playoff spot, and advance to the playoffs for the first time since 1946. The Hawks finished with club records in wins with 27, and points with 69.

Offensively, the team was led by Jim McFadden, who scored a team high 23 goals and 44 points, while newly acquired Cal Gardner earned a club best 24 assists, en route to earning 35 points. Jimmy Peters would join McFadden as the only Hawks with over 20 goals and 40 points, as he scored 22 and 41 respectively. George Gee scored 18 goals and 39 points, while posting a team high 99 penalty minutes. Team captain Bill Gadsby led the defense with 22 points, while fellow blueliner Al Dewsbury scored 5 goals, and finished with 97 penalty minutes.

In goal, Al Rollins played in all 70 games, setting a team record with 27 victories, along with a solid 2.50 GAA, and 6 shutouts.

=== Season standings ===
National Hockey League
		GP	W	L	T	GF	GA	DIFF	Pts
1	Detroit Red Wings	70	36	16	18	222	133	+89	90
2	Montreal Canadiens	70	28	23	19	155	148	+7	75
3	Boston Bruins	70	28	29	13	152	172	−20	69
4	Chicago Black Hawks	70	27	28	15	169	175	−6	69
5	Toronto Maple Leafs	70	27	30	13	156	167	−11	67
6	New York Rangers	70	17	37	16	152	211	−59	50

=== Record vs. opponents ===
1952–53 NHL Records
Team	BOS	CHI	DET	MTL	NYR	TOR
Boston	—	4–5–5	2–10–2	9–2–3	5–7–2	8–5–1
Chicago	5–4–5	—	3–9–2	3–7–4	10–3–1	6–6–2
Detroit	10–2–2	9–3–2	—	4–4–6	7–3–4	7–4–3
Montreal	2–9–3	7–3–4	4–4–6	—	7–2–5	7–5–2
New York	7–5–2	3–10–1	3–7–4	2–7–5	—	2–8–4
Toronto	5–8–1	6–6–2	4–7–3	5–7–2	8–2–4	—

== Playoffs ==
The Black Hawks would face the second place Montreal Canadiens in a best of seven opening round series. The Canadiens finished the year with a 28–23–19 record, earning 75 points, which was six more than the Hawks. The series opened up at the Montreal Forum, and the favored Canadiens won the series opener by a 3–1 score, then took a 2–0 series lead by winning a close second game by a 4–3 score. The series shifted to Chicago for the next two games, and the Black Hawks would respond, winning the third game in overtime to cut the series lead to 2–1, as the team won their first playoff game since 1944. The Hawks evened the series up at 2–2 with a 3–1 win in the fourth game, sending the series back to Montreal. Chicago stunned the Montreal crowd in the fifth game, defeating the Canadiens 4–2 to take a 3–2 series lead. The Canadiens, though, would shut out Chicago 3–0 in the sixth game, setting up a seventh and final game. Montreal would easily win the game, defeating the Black Hawks 4–1, putting an end to a very surprising season for the Black Hawks.

== Schedule and results ==
=== Regular season ===
1952–53 regular season
October

Game	Date	Visitor	Score	Home	Record	Points
1	October 9	Chicago Black Hawks	3–2	Montreal Canadiens	1–0–0	2
2	October 11	Chicago Black Hawks	6–2	Toronto Maple Leafs	2–0–0	4
3	October 12	New York Rangers	0–2	Chicago Black Hawks	3–0–0	6
4	October 14	Detroit Red Wings	1–1	Chicago Black Hawks	3–0–1	7
5	October 16	Chicago Black Hawks	0–7	Detroit Red Wings	3–1–1	7
6	October 19	Toronto Maple Leafs	3–2	Chicago Black Hawks	3–2–1	7
7	October 23	Montreal Canadiens	2–2	Chicago Black Hawks	3–2–2	8
8	October 26	Boston Bruins	1–1	Chicago Black Hawks	3–2–3	9
9	October 29	Chicago Black Hawks	3–1	New York Rangers	4–2–3	11
10	October 30	New York Rangers	3–8	Chicago Black Hawks	5–2–3	13

November

Game	Date	Visitor	Score	Home	Record	Points
11	November 2	Boston Bruins	1–4	Chicago Black Hawks	6–2–3	15
12	November 8	Chicago Black Hawks	4–6	Montreal Canadiens	6–3–3	15
13	November 9	Chicago Black Hawks	1–4	Boston Bruins	6–4–3	15
14	November 12	Chicago Black Hawks	2–5	New York Rangers	6–5–3	15
15	November 13	New York Rangers	2–6	Chicago Black Hawks	7–5–3	17
16	November 15	Chicago Black Hawks	3–1	Toronto Maple Leafs	8–5–3	19
17	November 16	Montreal Canadiens	1–4	Chicago Black Hawks	9–5–3	21
18	November 20	Boston Bruins	1–3	Chicago Black Hawks	10–5–3	23
19	November 22	Chicago Black Hawks	1–10	Detroit Red Wings	10–6–3	23
20	November 23	Detroit Red Wings	0–3	Chicago Black Hawks	11–6–3	25
21	November 27	Toronto Maple Leafs	3–3	Chicago Black Hawks	11–6–4	26
22	November 29	Chicago Black Hawks	1–1	Montreal Canadiens	11–6–5	27
23	November 30	New York Rangers	1–1	Chicago Black Hawks	11–6–6	28

December

Game	Date	Visitor	Score	Home	Record	Points
24	December 3	Chicago Black Hawks	5–3	New York Rangers	12–6–6	30
25	December 4	Chicago Black Hawks	1–5	Boston Bruins	12–7–6	30
26	December 6	Detroit Red Wings	2–0	Chicago Black Hawks	12–8–6	30
27	December 7	Toronto Maple Leafs	2–0	Chicago Black Hawks	12–9–6	30
28	December 11	Montreal Canadiens	3–2	Chicago Black Hawks	12–10–6	30
29	December 13	Chicago Black Hawks	0–3	Montreal Canadiens	12–11–6	30
30	December 14	Chicago Black Hawks	2–2	Boston Bruins	12–11–7	31
31	December 18	Boston Bruins	3–3	Chicago Black Hawks	12–11–8	32
32	December 20	Chicago Black Hawks	1–4	Toronto Maple Leafs	12–12–8	32
33	December 21	Toronto Maple Leafs	2–4	Chicago Black Hawks	13–12–8	34
34	December 25	Chicago Black Hawks	3–3	Detroit Red Wings	13–12–9	35
35	December 28	Chicago Black Hawks	6–3	New York Rangers	14–12–9	37

January

Game	Date	Visitor	Score	Home	Record	Points
36	January 1	Montreal Canadiens	2–2	Chicago Black Hawks	14–12–10	38
37	January 3	Chicago Black Hawks	1–1	Toronto Maple Leafs	14–12–11	39
38	January 4	Chicago Black Hawks	3–5	Detroit Red Wings	14–13–11	39
39	January 7	Chicago Black Hawks	6–4	New York Rangers	15–13–11	41
40	January 10	Chicago Black Hawks	2–5	Montreal Canadiens	15–14–11	41
41	January 11	Chicago Black Hawks	4–2	Boston Bruins	16–14–11	43
42	January 14	Chicago Black Hawks	0–3	Toronto Maple Leafs	16–15–11	43
43	January 15	Montreal Canadiens	2–0	Chicago Black Hawks	16–16–11	43
44	January 18	New York Rangers	0–2	Chicago Black Hawks	17–16–11	45
45	January 22	Chicago Black Hawks	3–3	Boston Bruins	17–16–12	46
46	January 24	Chicago Black Hawks	5–1	Montreal Canadiens	18–16–12	48
47	January 25	Toronto Maple Leafs	4–3	Chicago Black Hawks	18–17–12	48
48	January 29	Detroit Red Wings	5–2	Chicago Black Hawks	18–18–12	48
49	January 31	Chicago Black Hawks	0–4	Detroit Red Wings	18–19–12	48

February

Game	Date	Visitor	Score	Home	Record	Points
50	February 1	New York Rangers	1–0	Chicago Black Hawks	18–20–12	48
51	February 5	Chicago Black Hawks	1–4	Boston Bruins	18–21–12	48
52	February 7	Chicago Black Hawks	4–2	Toronto Maple Leafs	19–21–12	50
53	February 8	Toronto Maple Leafs	2–4	Chicago Black Hawks	20–21–12	52
54	February 12	Montreal Canadiens	3–2	Chicago Black Hawks	20–22–12	52
55	February 15	Detroit Red Wings	4–1	Chicago Black Hawks	20–23–12	52
56	February 16	Chicago Black Hawks	1–3	Detroit Red Wings	20–24–12	52
57	February 19	New York Rangers	4–2	Chicago Black Hawks	20–25–12	52
58	February 22	Boston Bruins	0–2	Chicago Black Hawks	21–25–12	54
59	February 27	Boston Bruins	0–3	Chicago Black Hawks	22–25–12	56

March

Game	Date	Visitor	Score	Home	Record	Points
60	March 1	Boston Bruins	2–2	Chicago Black Hawks	22–25–13	57
61	March 4	Chicago Black Hawks	4–1	New York Rangers	23–25–13	59
62	March 5	Toronto Maple Leafs	1–3	Chicago Black Hawks	24–25–13	61
63	March 7	Chicago Black Hawks	0–1	Montreal Canadiens	24–26–13	61
64	March 8	Chicago Black Hawks	1–2	Boston Bruins	24–27–13	61
65	March 12	Montreal Canadiens	2–2	Chicago Black Hawks	24–27–14	62
66	March 14	Chicago Black Hawks	3–1	Detroit Red Wings	25–27–14	64
67	March 15	Detroit Red Wings	0–0	Chicago Black Hawks	25–27–15	65
68	March 18	Chicago Black Hawks	3–4	Toronto Maple Leafs	25–28–15	65
69	March 21	Detroit Red Wings	3–4	Chicago Black Hawks	26–28–15	67
70	March 22	Chicago Black Hawks	3–1	New York Rangers	27–28–15	69

Legend: Win (2 points) Loss (0 points) Tie (1 point)

=== Playoffs ===
1953 Stanley Cup playoffs
Semifinals vs. (2) Montreal Canadiens – Canadiens win 4–3

Game	Date	Visitor	Score	Home	Series
1	March 24	Chicago Black Hawks	1–3	Montreal Canadiens	0–1
2	March 26	Chicago Black Hawks	3–4	Montreal Canadiens	0–2
3	March 29	Montreal Canadiens	1–2	Chicago Black Hawks	1–2
4	March 31	Montreal Canadiens	1–3	Chicago Black Hawks	2–2
5	April 2	Chicago Black Hawks	4–2	Montreal Canadiens	3–2
6	April 4	Montreal Canadiens	3–0	Chicago Black Hawks	3–3
7	April 7	Chicago Black Hawks	1–4	Montreal Canadiens	3–4

Legend: Win Loss

== Player statistics ==
=== Regular season ===
==== Scoring leaders ====
Player	GP	G	A	Pts	PIM
Jim McFadden	70	23	21	44	29
Jimmy Peters	69	22	19	41	16
George Gee	67	18	21	39	99
Gerry Couture	70	19	18	37	22
Bill Mosienko	65	17	20	37	8

==== Goaltending ====
Player	GP	TOI	W	L	T	GA	SO	GAA
Al Rollins	70	4200	27	28	15	175	6	2.50

=== Playoff ===
==== Scoring leaders ====
Player	GP	G	A	Pts	PIM
Bill Mosienko	7	4	2	6	7
Jim McFadden	7	3	0	3	4
George Gee	7	1	2	3	6
Al Dewsbury	7	1	2	3	4
Gus Mortson	7	1	1	2	6

==== Goaltending ====
Player	GP	TOI	W	L	GA	SO	GAA
Al Rollins	7	425	3	4	18	0	2.54

== Awards and records ==
The Chicago Black Hawks did not win any NHL awards for the 1952–53 NHL season.

=== All-Star teams ===
Second team	Position
Bill Gadsby	D

== Transactions ==
The following is a list of all transactions that have occurred for the Chicago Black Hawks during the 1952–53 NHL season. It lists which team each player has been traded to and for which player(s) or other consideration(s), if applicable.

July 22, 1952	To Detroit Red Wings cash	To Chicago Black Hawks Sid Abel
August 14, 1952	To Detroit Red Wings cash	To Chicago Black Hawks Fred Glover; Enio Sclisizzi
August 14, 1952	To Boston Bruins cash	To Chicago Black Hawks Ed Kryzanowski
September 11, 1952	To Toronto Maple Leafs Harry Lumley	To Chicago Black Hawks Cal Gardner; Ray Hannigan; Gus Mortson; Al Rollins
September 22, 1952	To Montreal Canadiens cash	To Chicago Black Hawks Gerry Couture
September 23, 1952	To Detroit Red Wings Red Almas; Guyle Fielder; Steve Hrymnak	To Chicago Black Hawks cash
October 15, 1952	To Detroit Red Wings loan of Ray Hannigan for 1952–53 season	To Chicago Black Hawks loan of Guyle Fielder for 1952–53 season
October 31, 1952	To Boston Bruins Ed Kryzanowski	To Chicago Black Hawks cash
January 9, 1953	To Chicago Black Hawks cash	To New York Rangers rights to Pete Babando
