= 1952–53 Detroit Red Wings season =

Sports season

1952–53 Detroit Red Wings
- League: 1st NHL
- 1952–53 record: 36–16–18
- Home record: 20–5–10
- Road record: 16–11–8
- Goals for: 222
- Goals against: 133

Team information
- General manager: Jack Adams
- Coach: Tommy Ivan
- Captain: Ted Lindsay
- Alternate captains: Red Kelly
- Arena: Detroit Olympia

Team leaders
- Goals: Gordie Howe (49)
- Assists: Gordie Howe (46)
- Points: Gordie Howe (95)
- Penalty minutes: Ted Lindsay (111)
- Wins: Terry Sawchuk (32)
- Goals against average: Glenn Hall (1.67)

The 1952–53 Detroit Red Wings season was the Red Wings' 27th season.

== Regular season ==
=== Final standings ===
National Hockey League
		GP	W	L	T	GF	GA	DIFF	Pts
1	Detroit Red Wings	70	36	16	18	222	133	+89	90
2	Montreal Canadiens	70	28	23	19	155	148	+7	75
3	Boston Bruins	70	28	29	13	152	172	−20	69
4	Chicago Black Hawks	70	27	28	15	169	175	−6	69
5	Toronto Maple Leafs	70	27	30	13	156	167	−11	67
6	New York Rangers	70	17	37	16	152	211	−59	50

=== Record vs. opponents ===
1952–53 NHL Records
Team	BOS	CHI	DET	MTL	NYR	TOR
Boston	—	4–5–5	2–10–2	9–2–3	5–7–2	8–5–1
Chicago	5–4–5	—	3–9–2	3–7–4	10–3–1	6–6–2
Detroit	10–2–2	9–3–2	—	4–4–6	7–3–4	7–4–3
Montreal	2–9–3	7–3–4	4–4–6	—	7–2–5	7–5–2
New York	7–5–2	3–10–1	3–7–4	2–7–5	—	2–8–4
Toronto	5–8–1	6–6–2	4–7–3	5–7–2	8–2–4	—

== Schedule and results ==
1952–53 regular season
October

Game	Result	Date	Score	Opponent	Record
1	W	October 9, 1952	5–3	New York Rangers (1952–53)	1–0–0
2	L	October 11, 1952	1–2	@ Montreal Canadiens (1952–53)	1–1–0
3	T	October 12, 1952	4–4	Toronto Maple Leafs (1952–53)	1–1–1
4	T	October 14, 1952	1–1	@ Chicago Black Hawks (1952–53)	1–1–2
5	W	October 16, 1952	7–0	Chicago Black Hawks (1952–53)	2–1–2
6	W	October 19, 1952	6–1	Montreal Canadiens (1952–53)	3–1–2
8	L	October 25, 1952	0–9	@ Montreal Canadiens (1952–53)	3–3–2
9	L	October 26, 1952	2–3	@ New York Rangers (1952–53)	3–4–2
10	W	October 30, 1952	4–1	Boston Bruins (1952–53)	4–4–2

November

Game	Result	Date	Score	Opponent	Record
11	L	November 2, 1952	2–4	Toronto Maple Leafs (1952–53)	4–5–2
12	L	November 6, 1952	0–2	@ Boston Bruins (1952–53)	4–6–2
13	T	November 8, 1952	3–3	@ Toronto Maple Leafs (1952–53)	4–6–3
14	W	November 9, 1952	3–1	New York Rangers (1952–53)	5–6–3
15	W	November 13, 1952	3–0	Boston Bruins (1952–53)	6–6–3
16	W	November 16, 1952	5–2	@ Boston Bruins (1952–53)	7–6–3
17	T	November 19, 1952	2–2	@ New York Rangers (1952–53)	7–6–4
18	W	November 22, 1952	10–1	Chicago Black Hawks (1952–53)	8–6–4
19	L	November 23, 1952	0–3	@ Chicago Black Hawks (1952–53)	8–7–4
20	T	November 27, 1952	2–2	Montreal Canadiens (1952–53)	8–7–5
21	W	November 29, 1952	3–1	@ Toronto Maple Leafs (1952–53)	9–7–5
22	W	November 30, 1952	4–1	Toronto Maple Leafs (1952–53)	10–7–5

December

Game	Result	Date	Score	Opponent	Record
23	W	December 4, 1952	5–3	New York Rangers (1952–53)	11–7–5
24	W	December 6, 1952	2–0	@ Chicago Black Hawks (1952–53)	12–7–5
25	T	December 7, 1952	1–1	Boston Bruins (1952–53)	12–7–6
26	W	December 11, 1952	10–1	@ Boston Bruins (1952–53)	13–7–6
27	W	December 13, 1952	3–1	@ Toronto Maple Leafs (1952–53)	14–7–6
28	T	December 14, 1952	0–0	Montreal Canadiens (1952–53)	14–7–7
29	T	December 18, 1952	1–1	Toronto Maple Leafs (1952–53)	14–7–8
30	T	December 20, 1952	1–1	New York Rangers (1952–53)	14–7–9
31	W	December 21, 1952	5–2	@ New York Rangers (1952–53)	15–7–9
32	T	December 25, 1952	3–3	Chicago Black Hawks (1952–53)	15–7–10
33	T	December 27, 1952	2–2	@ Montreal Canadiens (1952–53)	15–7–11
34	W	December 28, 1952	7–1	Boston Bruins (1952–53)	16–7–11
35	L	December 31, 1952	0–2	Montreal Canadiens (1952–53)	16–8–11

January

Game	Result	Date	Score	Opponent	Record
36	W	January 4, 1953	5–3	Chicago Black Hawks (1952–53)	17–8–11
37	W	January 8, 1953	4–0	Boston Bruins (1952–53)	18–8–11
38	W	January 11, 1953	5–2	Toronto Maple Leafs (1952–53)	19–8–11
39	L	January 14, 1953	2–3	@ New York Rangers (1952–53)	19–9–11
40	W	January 15, 1953	4–0	@ Boston Bruins (1952–53)	20–9–11
41	T	January 17, 1953	1–1	@ Montreal Canadiens (1952–53)	20–9–12
42	L	January 18, 1953	2–3	Montreal Canadiens (1952–53)	20–10–12
43	L	January 22, 1953	2–8	New York Rangers (1952–53)	20–11–12
44	L	January 24, 1953	0–2	@ Toronto Maple Leafs (1952–53)	20–12–12
45	T	January 25, 1953	3–3	Montreal Canadiens (1952–53)	20–12–13
46	W	January 29, 1953	5–2	@ Chicago Black Hawks (1952–53)	21–12–13
47	W	January 31, 1953	4–0	Chicago Black Hawks (1952–53)	22–12–13

February

Game	Result	Date	Score	Opponent	Record
48	W	February 1, 1953	5–1	Toronto Maple Leafs (1952–53)	23–12–13
49	T	February 5, 1953	3–3	New York Rangers (1952–53)	23–12–14
50	W	February 7, 1953	3–1	@ Montreal Canadiens (1952–53)	24–12–14
51	W	February 8, 1953	5–3	@ Boston Bruins (1952–53)	25–12–14
52	T	February 11, 1953	2–2	@ New York Rangers (1952–53)	25–12–15
53	L	February 12, 1953	1–3	@ Boston Bruins (1952–53)	25–13–15
54	W	February 15, 1953	4–1	@ Chicago Black Hawks (1952–53)	26–13–15
55	W	February 16, 1953	3–1	Chicago Black Hawks (1952–53)	27–13–15
56	L	February 18, 1953	0–2	@ Toronto Maple Leafs (1952–53)	27–14–15
57	W	February 19, 1953	4–1	@ Montreal Canadiens (1952–53)	28–14–15
58	W	February 22, 1953	2–1	@ New York Rangers (1952–53)	29–14–15
59	W	February 28, 1953	4–3	@ Montreal Canadiens (1952–53)	30–14–15

March

Game	Result	Date	Score	Opponent	Record
60	W	March 2, 1953	10–2	Boston Bruins (1952–53)	31–14–15
61	W	March 5, 1953	7–1	New York Rangers (1952–53)	32–14–15
62	W	March 7, 1953	3–0	@ Toronto Maple Leafs (1952–53)	33–14–15
63	W	March 8, 1953	3–1	Toronto Maple Leafs (1952–53)	34–14–15
64	W	March 11, 1953	2–0	@ New York Rangers (1952–53)	35–14–15
65	T	March 12, 1953	2–2	@ Boston Bruins (1952–53)	35–14–16
66	L	March 14, 1953	1–3	Chicago Black Hawks (1952–53)	35–15–16
67	T	March 15, 1953	0–0	@ Chicago Black Hawks (1952–53)	35–15–17
68	W	March 19, 1953	6–1	Boston Bruins (1952–53)	36–15–17
69	L	March 21, 1953	3–4	@ Chicago Black Hawks (1952–53)	36–16–17
70	T	March 22, 1953	1–1	Montreal Canadiens (1952–53)	36–16–18

Legend: Win (2 points) Loss (0 points) Tie (1 point)

== Player statistics ==
=== Regular season ===
Scoring

Player	Pos	GP	G	A	Pts	PIM
Gordie Howe	RW	70	49	46	95	57
Ted Lindsay	LW	70	32	39	71	111
Alex Delvecchio	C/LW	70	16	43	59	28
Metro Prystai	C	70	16	34	50	12
Red Kelly	D/C	70	19	27	46	8
Johnny Wilson	LW	70	23	19	42	22
Marty Pavelich	LW	64	13	20	33	49
Tony Leswick	W	70	15	12	27	87
Glen Skov	C/LW	70	12	15	27	54
Marcel Pronovost	D	68	8	19	27	72
Reg Sinclair	RW/C	69	11	12	23	36
Bob Goldham	D	70	1	13	14	32
Marcel Bonin	W	37	4	9	13	14
Benny Woit	RW/D	70	1	5	6	40
Jim Hay	D	42	1	4	5	2
Larry Wilson	C	15	0	4	4	6
Lou Jankowski	C/RW	22	1	2	3	0
Red Almas	G	1	0	0	0	0
Bill Folk	D	8	0	0	0	2
Glenn Hall	G	6	0	0	0	0
Terry Sawchuk	G	63	0	0	0	5
Vic Stasiuk	LW	3	0	0	0	0
Larry Zeidel	D	9	0	0	0	8

Goaltending

Player	MIN	GP	W	L	T	GA	GAA	SO
Terry Sawchuk	3780	63	32	15	16	120	1.90	9
Glenn Hall	360	6	4	1	1	10	1.67	1
Red Almas	60	1	0	0	1	3	3.00	0
Team:	4200	70	36	16	18	133	1.90	10

=== Playoffs ===
Scoring

Player	Pos	GP	G	A	Pts	PIM
Ted Lindsay	LW	6	4	4	8	6
Metro Prystai	C	6	4	4	8	2
Gordie Howe	RW	6	2	5	7	2
Johnny Wilson	LW	6	2	5	7	0
Alex Delvecchio	C/LW	6	2	4	6	2
Benny Woit	RW/D	6	1	3	4	0
Red Kelly	D/C	6	0	4	4	0
Marty Pavelich	LW	6	2	1	3	7
Bob Goldham	D	6	1	1	2	2
Tony Leswick	W	6	1	0	1	11
Reg Sinclair	RW/C	3	1	0	1	0
Glen Skov	C/LW	6	1	0	1	2
Marcel Bonin	W	5	0	1	1	0
Guyle Fielder	C	4	0	0	0	0
Jim Hay	D	4	0	0	0	2
Steve Hrymnak	D	2	0	0	0	0
Lou Jankowski	C/RW	1	0	0	0	0
Marcel Pronovost	D	6	0	0	0	6
Terry Sawchuk	G	6	0	0	0	10

Goaltending

Player	MIN	GP	W	L	GA	GAA	SO
Terry Sawchuk	372	6	2	4	21	3.39	1
Team:	372	6	2	4	21	3.39	1

Note: GP = Games played; G = Goals; A = Assists; Pts = Points; +/- = Plus-minus PIM = Penalty minutes; PPG = Power-play goals; SHG = Short-handed goals; GWG = Game-winning goals;
MIN = Minutes played; W = Wins; L = Losses; T = Ties; GA = Goals against; GAA = Goals-against average; SO = Shutouts;

== Awards and records ==
Prince of Wales Trophy (Best regular-season record)
Art Ross Trophy (Top scorer): Gordie Howe
Hart Trophy (Most valuable player): Gordie Howe
Lady Byng Memorial Trophy (Excellence and sportsmanship): Red Kelly
Vezina Trophy (Goaltender of team with best goals-against record): Terry Sawchuk

=== All-Star teams ===
First team	Position
Terry Sawchuk	G
Red Kelly	D
Gordie Howe	RW
Ted Lindsay	LW
Second team	Position
Alex Delvecchio	C

== Transactions ==
The following is a list of all transactions that have occurred for the Detroit Red Wings during the 1952–53 NHL season. It lists which team each player has been traded to and for which player(s) or other consideration(s), if applicable.

July 22, 1952	To Detroit Red Wings cash	To Chicago Black Hawks Sid Abel
August 14, 1952	To Detroit Red Wings cash	To Chicago Black Hawks Fred Glover; Enio Sclisizzi
August 18, 1952	To Detroit Red Wings Jim Morrison; Reg Sinclair cash	To New York Rangers Leo Reise Jr.
September 23, 1952	To Detroit Red Wings Red Almas; Guyle Fielder; Steve Hrymnak	To Chicago Black Hawks cash
October 15, 1952	To Detroit Red Wings loan of Ray Hannigan for 1952–53 season	To Chicago Black Hawks loan of Guyle Fielder for 1952–53 season

== See also ==
- 1952–53 NHL season
