= 1952–53 Toronto Maple Leafs season =

NHL hockey team season

1952–53 Toronto Maple Leafs
- League: 5th NHL
- 1952–53 record: 27–30–13
- Home record: 17–12–6
- Road record: 10–18–7
- Goals for: 156
- Goals against: 167

Team information
- General manager: Conn Smythe
- Coach: Joe Primeau
- Captain: Ted Kennedy
- Alternate captains: Max Bentley; Harry Watson
- Arena: Maple Leaf Gardens

Team leaders
- Goals: Sid Smith (20)
- Assists: Ted Kennedy (23); Bob Hassard (23)
- Points: Sid Smith (39)
- Penalty minutes: Fern Flaman (110)
- Wins: Harry Lumley (27)
- Goals against average: Harry Lumley (2.39)

The 1952–53 Toronto Maple Leafs season was Toronto's 36th season in the National Hockey League (NHL). The team missed the playoffs for the first time since the 1945–46 season.

== Regular season ==
=== Final standings ===
National Hockey League
		GP	W	L	T	GF	GA	DIFF	Pts
1	Detroit Red Wings	70	36	16	18	222	133	+89	90
2	Montreal Canadiens	70	28	23	19	155	148	+7	75
3	Boston Bruins	70	28	29	13	152	172	−20	69
4	Chicago Black Hawks	70	27	28	15	169	175	−6	69
5	Toronto Maple Leafs	70	27	30	13	156	167	−11	67
6	New York Rangers	70	17	37	16	152	211	−59	50

=== Record vs. opponents ===
1952–53 NHL Records
Team	BOS	CHI	DET	MTL	NYR	TOR
Boston	—	4–5–5	2–10–2	9–2–3	5–7–2	8–5–1
Chicago	5–4–5	—	3–9–2	3–7–4	10–3–1	6–6–2
Detroit	10–2–2	9–3–2	—	4–4–6	7–3–4	7–4–3
Montreal	2–9–3	7–3–4	4–4–6	—	7–2–5	7–5–2
New York	7–5–2	3–10–1	3–7–4	2–7–5	—	2–8–4
Toronto	5–8–1	6–6–2	4–7–3	5–7–2	8–2–4	—

== Schedule and results ==
1952–53 regular season
October

Game	Result	Date	Score	Opponent	Record
1	L	October 11, 1952	2–6	Chicago Black Hawks (1952–53)	0–1–0
2	T	October 12, 1952	4–4	@ Detroit Red Wings (1952–53)	0–1–1
3	L	October 16, 1952	1–2	@ Boston Bruins (1952–53)	0–2–1
4	W	October 18, 1952	4–3	New York Rangers (1952–53)	1–2–1
5	W	October 19, 1952	3–2	@ Chicago Black Hawks (1952–53)	2–2–1
6	W	October 22, 1952	5–4	Detroit Red Wings (1952–53)	3–2–1
7	L	October 25, 1952	0–4	Boston Bruins (1952–53)	3–3–1
8	W	October 29, 1952	7–5	Montreal Canadiens (1952–53)	4–3–1

November

Game	Result	Date	Score	Opponent	Record
9	W	November 1, 1952	3–2	Boston Bruins (1952–53)	5–3–1
10	W	November 2, 1952	4–2	@ Detroit Red Wings (1952–53)	6–3–1
11	W	November 5, 1952	4–1	New York Rangers (1952–53)	7–3–1
12	L	November 6, 1952	1–3	@ Montreal Canadiens (1952–53)	7–4–1
13	T	November 8, 1952	3–3	Detroit Red Wings (1952–53)	7–4–2
14	L	November 11, 1952	0–4	@ Boston Bruins (1952–53)	7–5–2
15	W	November 13, 1952	3–1	@ Montreal Canadiens (1952–53)	8–5–2
16	L	November 15, 1952	1–3	Chicago Black Hawks (1952–53)	8–6–2
17	W	November 16, 1952	6–3	@ New York Rangers (1952–53)	9–6–2
18	L	November 19, 1952	1–2	Boston Bruins (1952–53)	9–7–2
19	T	November 22, 1952	2–2	Montreal Canadiens (1952–53)	9–7–3
20	L	November 23, 1952	5–6	@ Boston Bruins (1952–53)	9–8–3
21	L	November 26, 1952	2–4	@ New York Rangers (1952–53)	9–9–3
22	T	November 27, 1952	3–3	@ Chicago Black Hawks (1952–53)	9–9–4
23	L	November 29, 1952	1–3	Detroit Red Wings (1952–53)	9–10–4
24	L	November 30, 1952	1–4	@ Detroit Red Wings (1952–53)	9–11–4

December

Game	Result	Date	Score	Opponent	Record
25	W	December 4, 1952	2–1	@ Montreal Canadiens (1952–53)	10–11–4
26	T	December 6, 1952	2–2	New York Rangers (1952–53)	10–11–5
27	W	December 7, 1952	2–0	@ Chicago Black Hawks (1952–53)	11–11–5
28	L	December 10, 1952	1–2	Montreal Canadiens (1952–53)	11–12–5
29	L	December 13, 1952	1–3	Detroit Red Wings (1952–53)	11–13–5
30	T	December 14, 1952	2–2	@ New York Rangers (1952–53)	11–13–6
31	T	December 18, 1952	1–1	@ Detroit Red Wings (1952–53)	11–13–7
32	W	December 20, 1952	4–1	Chicago Black Hawks (1952–53)	12–13–7
33	L	December 21, 1952	2–4	@ Chicago Black Hawks (1952–53)	12–14–7
34	W	December 24, 1952	2–0	Montreal Canadiens (1952–53)	13–14–7
35	W	December 27, 1952	3–0	Boston Bruins (1952–53)	14–14–7
36	T	December 31, 1952	3–3	@ New York Rangers (1952–53)	14–14–8

January

Game	Result	Date	Score	Opponent	Record
37	L	January 1, 1953	1–5	@ Boston Bruins (1952–53)	14–15–8
38	T	January 3, 1953	1–1	Chicago Black Hawks (1952–53)	14–15–9
39	W	January 10, 1953	3–1	Boston Bruins (1952–53)	15–15–9
40	L	January 11, 1953	2–5	@ Detroit Red Wings (1952–53)	15–16–9
41	W	January 14, 1953	3–0	Chicago Black Hawks (1952–53)	16–16–9
42	W	January 17, 1953	1–0	New York Rangers (1952–53)	17–16–9
43	L	January 18, 1953	1–2	@ Boston Bruins (1952–53)	17–17–9
44	L	January 21, 1953	0–1	Montreal Canadiens (1952–53)	17–18–9
45	L	January 22, 1953	1–4	@ Montreal Canadiens (1952–53)	17–19–9
46	W	January 24, 1953	2–0	Detroit Red Wings (1952–53)	18–19–9
47	W	January 25, 1953	4–3	@ Chicago Black Hawks (1952–53)	19–19–9
48	T	January 29, 1953	2–2	@ Boston Bruins (1952–53)	19–19–10
49	W	January 31, 1953	4–0	New York Rangers (1952–53)	20–19–10

February

Game	Result	Date	Score	Opponent	Record
50	L	February 1, 1953	1–5	@ Detroit Red Wings (1952–53)	20–20–10
51	L	February 5, 1953	0–2	@ Montreal Canadiens (1952–53)	20–21–10
52	L	February 7, 1953	2–4	Chicago Black Hawks (1952–53)	20–22–10
53	L	February 8, 1953	2–4	@ Chicago Black Hawks (1952–53)	20–23–10
54	T	February 14, 1953	2–2	Montreal Canadiens (1952–53)	20–23–11
55	W	February 15, 1953	2–1	@ New York Rangers (1952–53)	21–23–11
56	W	February 18, 1953	2–0	Detroit Red Wings (1952–53)	22–23–11
57	T	February 21, 1953	2–2	Boston Bruins (1952–53)	22–23–12
58	L	February 25, 1953	1–2	Montreal Canadiens (1952–53)	22–24–12
59	L	February 26, 1953	1–4	@ Montreal Canadiens (1952–53)	22–25–12
60	W	February 28, 1953	3–0	New York Rangers (1952–53)	23–25–12

March

Game	Result	Date	Score	Opponent	Record
61	L	March 1, 1953	2–4	@ New York Rangers (1952–53)	23–26–12
62	L	March 5, 1953	1–3	@ Chicago Black Hawks (1952–53)	23–27–12
63	L	March 7, 1953	0–3	Detroit Red Wings (1952–53)	23–28–12
64	L	March 8, 1953	1–3	@ Detroit Red Wings (1952–53)	23–29–12
65	L	March 14, 1953	1–3	Boston Bruins (1952–53)	23–30–12
66	T	March 15, 1953	1–1	@ New York Rangers (1952–53)	23–30–13
67	W	March 18, 1953	4–3	Chicago Black Hawks (1952–53)	24–30–13
68	W	March 19, 1953	4–1	@ Montreal Canadiens (1952–53)	25–30–13
69	W	March 21, 1953	5–0	New York Rangers (1952–53)	26–30–13
70	W	March 22, 1953	3–1	@ Boston Bruins (1952–53)	27–30–13

Legend: Win (2 points) Loss (0 points) Tie (1 point)

== Player statistics ==
=== Regular season ===
Scoring

Player	GP	G	A	Pts	PIM
Sid Smith	70	20	19	39	6
Ted Kennedy	43	14	23	37	42
Gord Hannigan	65	17	18	35	51
Ron Stewart	70	13	22	35	29
Bob Hassard	70	8	23	31	14
Tod Sloan	70	15	10	25	76
George Armstrong	52	14	11	25	54
Harry Watson	63	16	8	24	8
Max Bentley	36	12	11	23	16
Jimmy Thomson	69	0	22	22	73
Eric Nesterenko	35	10	6	16	27
Tim Horton	70	2	14	16	85
Leo Boivin	70	2	13	15	97
Rudy Migay	40	5	4	9	22
Jim Morrison	56	1	8	9	36
Fern Flaman	66	2	6	8	110
Phil Maloney	29	2	6	8	2
Howie Meeker	25	1	7	8	26
Danny Lewicki	4	1	3	4	2
Bob Solinger	18	1	1	2	2
Hugh Bolton	9	0	0	0	10
Harry Lumley	70	0	0	0	18
Parker MacDonald	1	0	0	0	0
Willie Marshall	2	0	0	0	0
Wally Maxwell	2	0	0	0	0
Dave Reid	2	0	0	0	0
Frank Sullivan	5	0	0	0	2
Ray Timgren	12	0	0	0	4

Goaltending

Player	MIN	GP	W	L	T	GA	GAA	SA	SV	SV%	SO
Harry Lumley	4200	70	27	30	13	167	2.39				10
Team:	4200	70	27	30	13	167	2.39				10

== Awards and records ==
The Toronto Maple Leafs did not win any NHL awards and no players were selected for the All-Star Teams for the 1952–53 NHL season.

== Transactions ==
The following is a list of all transactions that have occurred for the Toronto Maple Leafs during the 1952–53 NHL season. It lists which team each player has been traded to and for which player(s) or other consideration(s), if applicable.

September 11, 1952	To Toronto Maple Leafs Harry Lumley	To Chicago Black Hawks Cal Gardner; Ray Hannigan; Gus Mortson; Al Rollins
September 16, 1952	To Toronto Maple Leafs cash	To Boston Bruins Joe Klukay

== See also ==
- 1952–53 NHL season
