= 1952–53 Montreal Canadiens season =

NHL hockey team season

1952–53 Montreal Canadiens
- Stanley Cup champions
- League: 2nd NHL
- 1952–53 record: 28–23–19
- Home record: 18–12–5
- Road record: 10–11–14
- Goals for: 155
- Goals against: 148

Team information
- General manager: Frank J. Selke
- Coach: Dick Irvin
- Captain: Emile Bouchard
- Arena: Montreal Forum

Team leaders
- Goals: Maurice Richard (28)
- Assists: Maurice Richard (33)
- Points: Maurice Richard (61)
- Penalty minutes: Maurice Richard (112)
- Wins: Gerry McNeil (25)
- Goals against average: Gerry McNeil (2.12)

The 1952–53 Montreal Canadiens season was the Canadiens' 44th season of play. The Canadiens placed second in the regular season, defeated the Chicago Black Hawks in the semi-final and the Boston Bruins in the final to win the club's seventh Stanley Cup championship. As of 2025, the last surviving member of the team is Reg Abbott, following the death of Paul Masnick on March 23, 2024.

== Regular season ==
=== Final standings ===
National Hockey League
		GP	W	L	T	GF	GA	DIFF	Pts
1	Detroit Red Wings	70	36	16	18	222	133	+89	90
2	Montreal Canadiens	70	28	23	19	155	148	+7	75
3	Boston Bruins	70	28	29	13	152	172	−20	69
4	Chicago Black Hawks	70	27	28	15	169	175	−6	69
5	Toronto Maple Leafs	70	27	30	13	156	167	−11	67
6	New York Rangers	70	17	37	16	152	211	−59	50

=== Record vs. opponents ===
1952–53 NHL Records
Team	BOS	CHI	DET	MTL	NYR	TOR
Boston	—	4–5–5	2–10–2	9–2–3	5–7–2	8–5–1
Chicago	5–4–5	—	3–9–2	3–7–4	10–3–1	6–6–2
Detroit	10–2–2	9–3–2	—	4–4–6	7–3–4	7–4–3
Montreal	2–9–3	7–3–4	4–4–6	—	7–2–5	7–5–2
New York	7–5–2	3–10–1	3–7–4	2–7–5	—	2–8–4
Toronto	5–8–1	6–6–2	4–7–3	5–7–2	8–2–4	—

== Schedule and results ==
1952–53 regular season
October

Game	Result	Date	Score	Opponent	Record
1	L	October 9, 1952	2–3	Chicago Black Hawks (1952–53)	0–1–0
2	W	October 11, 1952	2–1	Detroit Red Wings (1952–53)	1–1–0
3	T	October 12, 1952	1–1	@ Boston Bruins (1952–53)	1–1–1
4	W	October 16, 1952	3–1	New York Rangers (1952–53)	2–1–1
5	W	October 18, 1952	2–1	Boston Bruins (1952–53)	3–1–1
6	L	October 19, 1952	1–6	@ Detroit Red Wings (1952–53)	3–2–1
7	T	October 23, 1952	2–2	@ Chicago Black Hawks (1952–53)	3–2–2
8	W	October 25, 1952	9–0	Detroit Red Wings (1952–53)	4–2–2
9	L	October 29, 1952	5–7	@ Toronto Maple Leafs (1952–53)	4–3–2

November

Game	Result	Date	Score	Opponent	Record
10	W	November 1, 1952	4–1	New York Rangers (1952–53)	5–3–2
11	T	November 2, 1952	2–2	@ New York Rangers (1952–53)	5–3–3
12	W	November 6, 1952	3–1	Toronto Maple Leafs (1952–53)	6–3–3
13	W	November 8, 1952	6–4	Chicago Black Hawks (1952–53)	7–3–3
14	L	November 13, 1952	1–3	Toronto Maple Leafs (1952–53)	7–4–3
15	W	November 15, 1952	2–0	Boston Bruins (1952–53)	8–4–3
16	L	November 16, 1952	1–4	@ Chicago Black Hawks (1952–53)	8–5–3
17	T	November 22, 1952	2–2	@ Toronto Maple Leafs (1952–53)	8–5–4
18	T	November 23, 1952	2–2	@ New York Rangers (1952–53)	8–5–5
19	T	November 27, 1952	2–2	@ Detroit Red Wings (1952–53)	8–5–6
20	T	November 29, 1952	1–1	Chicago Black Hawks (1952–53)	8–5–7
21	L	November 30, 1952	1–3	@ Boston Bruins (1952–53)	8–6–7

December

Game	Result	Date	Score	Opponent	Record
22	L	December 4, 1952	1–2	Toronto Maple Leafs (1952–53)	8–7–7
23	L	December 6, 1952	1–2	Boston Bruins (1952–53)	8–8–7
24	T	December 7, 1952	2–2	@ New York Rangers (1952–53)	8–8–8
25	W	December 10, 1952	2–1	@ Toronto Maple Leafs (1952–53)	9–8–8
26	W	December 11, 1952	3–2	@ Chicago Black Hawks (1952–53)	10–8–8
27	W	December 13, 1952	3–0	Chicago Black Hawks (1952–53)	11–8–8
28	T	December 14, 1952	0–0	@ Detroit Red Wings (1952–53)	11–8–9
29	W	December 18, 1952	6–2	New York Rangers (1952–53)	12–8–9
30	L	December 20, 1952	3–6	Boston Bruins (1952–53)	12–9–9
31	W	December 21, 1952	4–3	@ Boston Bruins (1952–53)	13–9–9
32	L	December 24, 1952	0–2	@ Toronto Maple Leafs (1952–53)	13–10–9
33	T	December 27, 1952	2–2	Detroit Red Wings (1952–53)	13–10–10
34	W	December 31, 1952	2–0	@ Detroit Red Wings (1952–53)	14–10–10

January

Game	Result	Date	Score	Opponent	Record
35	T	January 1, 1953	2–2	@ Chicago Black Hawks (1952–53)	14–10–11
36	L	January 3, 1953	0–1	Boston Bruins (1952–53)	14–11–11
37	T	January 8, 1953	4–4	New York Rangers (1952–53)	14–11–12
38	W	January 10, 1953	5–2	Chicago Black Hawks (1952–53)	15–11–12
39	L	January 11, 1953	0–7	@ New York Rangers (1952–53)	15–12–12
40	W	January 15, 1953	2–0	@ Chicago Black Hawks (1952–53)	16–12–12
41	T	January 17, 1953	1–1	Detroit Red Wings (1952–53)	16–12–13
42	W	January 18, 1953	3–2	@ Detroit Red Wings (1952–53)	17–12–13
43	W	January 21, 1953	1–0	@ Toronto Maple Leafs (1952–53)	18–12–13
44	W	January 22, 1953	4–1	Toronto Maple Leafs (1952–53)	19–12–13
45	L	January 24, 1953	1–5	Chicago Black Hawks (1952–53)	19–13–13
46	T	January 25, 1953	3–3	@ Detroit Red Wings (1952–53)	19–13–14
47	W	January 28, 1953	2–1	@ New York Rangers (1952–53)	20–13–14
48	W	January 29, 1953	5–2	New York Rangers (1952–53)	21–13–14
49	T	January 31, 1953	0–0	Boston Bruins (1952–53)	21–13–15

February

Game	Result	Date	Score	Opponent	Record
50	L	February 1, 1953	3–4	@ Boston Bruins (1952–53)	21–14–15
51	W	February 5, 1953	2–0	Toronto Maple Leafs (1952–53)	22–14–15
52	L	February 7, 1953	1–3	Detroit Red Wings (1952–53)	22–15–15
53	T	February 8, 1953	1–1	@ New York Rangers (1952–53)	22–15–16
54	W	February 12, 1953	3–2	@ Chicago Black Hawks (1952–53)	23–15–16
55	T	February 14, 1953	2–2	@ Toronto Maple Leafs (1952–53)	23–15–17
56	L	February 15, 1953	0–1	@ Boston Bruins (1952–53)	23–16–17
57	L	February 19, 1953	1–4	Detroit Red Wings (1952–53)	23–17–17
58	W	February 21, 1953	4–1	New York Rangers (1952–53)	24–17–17
59	W	February 25, 1953	2–1	@ Toronto Maple Leafs (1952–53)	25–17–17
60	W	February 26, 1953	4–1	Toronto Maple Leafs (1952–53)	26–17–17
61	L	February 28, 1953	3–4	Detroit Red Wings (1952–53)	26–18–17

March

Game	Result	Date	Score	Opponent	Record
62	L	March 5, 1953	0–5	@ Boston Bruins (1952–53)	26–19–17
63	W	March 7, 1953	1–0	Chicago Black Hawks (1952–53)	27–19–17
64	L	March 8, 1953	3–4	@ New York Rangers (1952–53)	27–20–17
65	T	March 12, 1953	2–2	@ Chicago Black Hawks (1952–53)	27–20–18
66	W	March 14, 1953	3–2	New York Rangers (1952–53)	28–20–18
67	L	March 15, 1953	1–2	@ Boston Bruins (1952–53)	28–21–18
68	L	March 19, 1953	1–4	Toronto Maple Leafs (1952–53)	28–22–18
69	L	March 21, 1953	1–2	Boston Bruins (1952–53)	28–23–18
70	T	March 22, 1953	1–1	@ Detroit Red Wings (1952–53)	28–23–19

Legend: Win (2 points) Loss (0 points) Tie (1 point)

== Stanley Cup Finals ==
Date	Away	Score	Home	Score	Notes
April 9	Boston	2	Montreal	4	
April 11	Boston	4	Montreal	1	
April 12	Montreal	3	Boston	0	
April 14	Montreal	7	Boston	3	
April 16	Boston	0	Montreal	1	OT

Montreal won the best-of-seven series 4 games to 1.

== Player statistics ==
=== Regular season ===
==== Scoring ====
Player	Pos	GP	G	A	Pts	PIM
Maurice Richard	RW	70	28	33	61	112
Bert Olmstead	LW	69	17	28	45	83
Elmer Lach	C	53	16	25	41	56
Bernie Geoffrion	RW	65	22	17	39	37
Doug Harvey	D	69	4	30	34	67
Paul Meger	LW	69	9	17	26	38
Dick Gamble	LW	69	11	13	24	26
Floyd Curry	RW	68	16	6	22	10
Ken Mosdell	C	63	5	14	19	27
Billy Reay	C	56	4	15	19	26
Paul Masnick	C	53	5	7	12	44
Tom Johnson	D	70	3	8	11	63
Emile Bouchard	D	58	2	8	10	55
John McCormack	C	59	1	9	10	9
Dickie Moore	LW	18	2	6	8	19
Dollard St. Laurent	D	54	2	6	8	34
Jean Beliveau	C	3	5	0	5	0
Bud MacPherson	D	59	2	3	5	67
Gaye Stewart	LW	5	0	2	2	0
Ed Litzenberger	C/RW	2	1	0	1	2
Gerry Desaulniers	C	2	0	1	1	2
Ivan Irwin	D	4	0	1	1	0
Reg Abbott	C	3	0	0	0	0
Gerry McNeil	G	66	0	0	0	0
Hal Murphy	G	1	0	0	0	0
Jacques Plante	G	3	0	0	0	0
Rollie Rousseau	D	2	0	0	0	0

==== Goaltending ====
Player	MIN	GP	W	L	T	GA	GAA	SO
Gerry McNeil	3960	66	25	23	18	140	2.12	10
Jacques Plante	180	3	2	0	1	4	1.33	0
Hal Murphy	60	1	1	0	0	4	4.00	0
Team:	4200	70	28	23	19	148	2.11	10

=== Playoffs ===
==== Scoring ====
Player	Pos	GP	G	A	Pts	PIM
Bernie Geoffrion	RW	12	6	4	10	12
Maurice Richard	RW	12	7	1	8	2
Elmer Lach	C	12	1	6	7	6
Dickie Moore	LW	12	3	2	5	13
Ken Mosdell	C	7	3	2	5	4
Tom Johnson	D	12	2	3	5	8
Doug Harvey	D	12	0	5	5	8
Eddie Mazur	D/LW	7	2	2	4	11
Bert Olmstead	LW	12	2	2	4	4
Calum MacKay	LW	7	1	3	4	10
Floyd Curry	RW	12	2	1	3	2
Paul Meger	LW	5	1	2	3	4
Dollard St. Laurent	D	12	0	3	3	4
Emile Bouchard	D	12	1	1	2	6
Lorne Davis	RW	7	1	1	2	2
Billy Reay	C	11	0	2	2	4
Dick Gamble	LW	5	1	0	1	2
Paul Masnick	C	6	1	0	1	7
Bud MacPherson	D	4	0	1	1	9
Doug Anderson	C	2	0	0	0	0
John McCormack	C	9	0	0	0	0
Gerry McNeil	G	8	0	0	0	0
Jacques Plante	G	4	0	0	0	0

==== Goaltending ====
Player	MIN	GP	W	L	GA	GAA	SO
Gerry McNeil	486	8	5	3	16	1.98	2
Jacques Plante	240	4	3	1	7	1.75	1
Team:	726	12	8	4	23	1.90	3

Note:

Pos = Position;GP = Games played; G = Goals; A = Assists; Pts = Points; PIM = Penalty minutes; +/- = Plus/minus; PPG = Power-play goals; SHG = Short-handed goals; GWG = Game-winning goals
Pos = Position;GP = Games played; Min, TOI = Minutes played; W = Wins; L = Losses; T,T/OT = Ties; OTL = Overtime losses; GA = Goals-against; GAA = Goals-against average; SO = Shutouts; SA = Shots against; SV = Shots saved;SV% = Save percentage;

== Awards ==
Stanley Cup (NHL Playoff Champions)

=== All-Star teams ===
First team	Position
Doug Harvey	D
Second team	Position
Gerry McNeil	G
Maurice Richard	RW
Bert Olmstead	LW

== Transactions ==
The following is a list of all transactions that have occurred for the Montreal Canadiens during the 1952–53 NHL season. It lists which team each player has been traded to and for which player(s) or other consideration(s), if applicable.

September 22, 1952	To Montreal Canadiens cash	To Chicago Black Hawks Gerry Couture
October 8, 1952	To Montreal Canadiens rights to Frank Eddolls	To New York Rangers cash
