= 1952–53 New York Rangers season =

NHL hockey team season

1952–53 New York Rangers
- League: 6th NHL
- 1952–53 record: 17–37–16
- Home record: 11–14–10
- Road record: 6–23–6
- Goals for: 152
- Goals against: 211

Team information
- General manager: Frank Boucher
- Coach: Bill Cook
- Captain: Allan Stanley
- Arena: Madison Square Garden

Team leaders
- Goals: Wally Hergesheimer (30)
- Assists: Paul Ronty (38)
- Points: Wally Hergesheimer (59)
- Penalty minutes: Hy Buller (73)
- Wins: Gump Worsley (13)
- Goals against average: Chuck Rayner (2.90)

The 1952–53 New York Rangers season was the franchise's 27th season. During the regular season, the Rangers compiled a 17–37–16 record and finished with 50 points. The Rangers' last-place finish caused them to miss the NHL playoffs for the third year in a row for the first time since the 1944–45 to 1946–47 seasons.

== Regular season ==
=== Final standings ===
National Hockey League
		GP	W	L	T	GF	GA	DIFF	Pts
1	Detroit Red Wings	70	36	16	18	222	133	+89	90
2	Montreal Canadiens	70	28	23	19	155	148	+7	75
3	Boston Bruins	70	28	29	13	152	172	−20	69
4	Chicago Black Hawks	70	27	28	15	169	175	−6	69
5	Toronto Maple Leafs	70	27	30	13	156	167	−11	67
6	New York Rangers	70	17	37	16	152	211	−59	50

=== Record vs. opponents ===
1952–53 NHL Records
Team	BOS	CHI	DET	MTL	NYR	TOR
Boston	—	4–5–5	2–10–2	9–2–3	5–7–2	8–5–1
Chicago	5–4–5	—	3–9–2	3–7–4	10–3–1	6–6–2
Detroit	10–2–2	9–3–2	—	4–4–6	7–3–4	7–4–3
Montreal	2–9–3	7–3–4	4–4–6	—	7–2–5	7–5–2
New York	7–5–2	3–10–1	3–7–4	2–7–5	—	2–8–4
Toronto	5–8–1	6–6–2	4–7–3	5–7–2	8–2–4	—

== Schedule and results ==
1952–53 regular season
October: 1–6–2 (home: 1–1–1; road: 0–5–1)

Game	October	Opponent	Score	Record
1	9	@ Detroit Red Wings	5–3	0–1–0
2	12	@ Chicago Black Hawks	2–0	0–2–0
3	16	@ Montreal Canadiens	3–1	0–3–0
4	18	@ Toronto Maple Leafs	4–3	0–4–0
5	19	@ Boston Bruins	2–2	0–4–1
6	22	Boston Bruins	3–3	0–4–2
7	26	Detroit Red Wings	3–2	1–4–2
8	29	Chicago Black Hawks	3–1	1–5–2
9	30	@ Chicago Black Hawks	8–3	1–6–2

November: 2–6–4 (home: 2–1–3; road: 0–5–1)

Game	November	Opponent	Score	Record
10	1	@ Montreal Canadiens	4–1	1–7–2
11	2	Montreal Canadiens	2–2	1–7–3
12	5	@ Toronto Maple Leafs	4–1	1–8–3
13	9	@ Detroit Red Wings	3–1	1–9–3
14	12	Chicago Black Hawks	5–2	2–9–3
15	13	@ Chicago Black Hawks	6–2	2–10–3
16	16	Toronto Maple Leafs	6–3	2–11–3
17	19	Detroit Red Wings	2–2	2–11–4
18	23	Montreal Canadiens	2–2	2–11–5
19	26	Toronto Maple Leafs	4–2	3–11–5
20	27	@ Boston Bruins	3–1	3–12–5
21	30	@ Chicago Black Hawks	1–1	3–12–6

December: 2–6–5 (home: 1–4–3; road: 1–2–2)

Game	December	Opponent	Score	Record
22	3	Chicago Black Hawks	5–3	3–13–6
23	4	@ Detroit Red Wings	5–3	3–14–6
24	6	@ Toronto Maple Leafs	2–2	3–14–7
25	7	Montreal Canadiens	2–2	3–14–8
26	10	Boston Bruins	4–1	3–15–8
27	14	Toronto Maple Leafs	2–2	3–15–9
28	17	Boston Bruins	5–0	4–15–9
29	18	@ Montreal Canadiens	6–2	4–16–9
30	20	@ Detroit Red Wings	1–1	4–16–10
31	21	Detroit Red Wings	5–2	4–17–10
32	25	@ Boston Bruins	2–1	5–17–10
33	28	Chicago Black Hawks	6–3	5–18–10
34	31	Toronto Maple Leafs	3–3	5–18–11

January: 5–7–1 (home: 3–2–0; road: 2–5–1)

Game	January	Opponent	Score	Record
35	4	Boston Bruins	5–2	6–18–11
36	7	Chicago Black Hawks	6–4	6–19–11
37	8	@ Montreal Canadiens	4–4	6–19–12
38	11	Montreal Canadiens	7–0	7–19–12
39	14	Detroit Red Wings	3–2	8–19–12
40	17	@ Toronto Maple Leafs	1–0	8–20–12
41	18	@ Chicago Black Hawks	2–0	8–21–12
42	22	@ Detroit Red Wings	8–2	9–21–12
43	24	@ Boston Bruins	9–0	9–22–12
44	25	@ Boston Bruins	2–1	10–22–12
45	28	Montreal Canadiens	2–1	10–23–12
46	29	@ Montreal Canadiens	5–2	10–24–12
47	31	@ Toronto Maple Leafs	4–0	10–25–12

February: 4–5–3 (home: 2–2–2; road: 2–3–1)

Game	February	Opponent	Score	Record
48	1	@ Chicago Black Hawks	1–0	11–25–12
49	5	@ Detroit Red Wings	3–3	11–25–13
50	8	Montreal Canadiens	1–1	11–25–14
51	11	Detroit Red Wings	2–2	11–25–15
52	14	@ Boston Bruins	5–4	11–26–15
53	15	Toronto Maple Leafs	2–1	11–27–15
54	18	Boston Bruins	4–2	12–27–15
55	19	@ Chicago Black Hawks	4–2	13–27–15
56	21	@ Montreal Canadiens	4–1	13–28–15
57	22	Detroit Red Wings	2–1	13–29–15
58	25	Boston Bruins	2–1	14–29–15
59	28	@ Toronto Maple Leafs	3–0	14–30–15

March: 3–7–1 (home: 2–4–1; road: 1–3–0)

Game	March	Opponent	Score	Record
60	1	Toronto Maple Leafs	4–2	15–30–15
61	4	Chicago Black Hawks	4–1	15–31–15
62	5	@ Detroit Red Wings	7–1	15–32–15
63	7	@ Boston Bruins	2–1	16–32–15
64	8	Montreal Canadiens	4–3	17–32–15
65	11	Detroit Red Wings	2–0	17–33–15
66	14	@ Montreal Canadiens	3–2	17–34–15
67	15	Toronto Maple Leafs	1–1	17–34–16
68	18	Boston Bruins	2–1	17–35–16
69	21	@ Toronto Maple Leafs	5–0	17–36–16
70	22	Chicago Black Hawks	3–1	17–37–16

Legend: Win (2 points) Loss (0 points) Tie (1 point)

== Player statistics ==
Skaters

Regular season
Player	GP	G	A	Pts	PIM
Wally Hergesheimer	70	30	29	59	10
Paul Ronty	70	16	38	54	20
Nick Mickoski	70	19	16	35	39
Jack Stoddard	60	12	13	25	29
Hy Buller	70	7	18	25	73
Neil Strain	52	11	13	24	12
Don Raleigh	55	4	18	22	2
Leo Reise	61	4	15	19	53
Ed Kullman	70	8	10	18	61
Allan Stanley	70	5	12	17	52
Harry Howell	67	3	8	11	46
Steve Kraftcheck	69	2	9	11	45
Dean Prentice	55	6	3	9	20
Pete Babando^{†}	30	4	5	9	2
Herb Dickenson	11	4	4	8	2
Aldo Guidolin	30	4	4	8	24
Ed Slowinski	37	2	5	7	14
George Senick	13	2	3	5	8
Jim Conacher	17	1	4	5	2
Ron Murphy	15	3	1	4	0
Edgar Laprade	11	2	1	3	2
Gaye Stewart^{‡}	18	1	2	3	8
Jim Ross	11	0	2	2	4
Kelly Burnett	3	1	0	1	0
Aggie Kukulowicz	3	1	0	1	0
Gordie Haworth	2	0	1	1	0
Andy Bathgate	18	0	1	1	6
Frank Bathgate	2	0	0	0	2
Jackie McLeod	3	0	0	0	2
Mike Labadie	3	0	0	0	0
Ian MacIntosh	4	0	0	0	4

Goaltenders

Regular season
Player	GP	TOI	W	L	T	GA	GAA	SO
Lorne Worsley	50	3000	13	29	8	153	3.06	2
Chuck Rayner	20	1200	4	8	8	58	2.90	1

^{†}Denotes player spent time with another team before joining Rangers. Stats reflect time with Rangers only.
^{‡}Traded mid-season. Stats reflect time with Rangers only.

Note:

Pos = Position;GP = Games played; G = Goals; A = Assists; Pts = Points; PIM = Penalty minutes; +/- = Plus/minus; PPG = Power-play goals; SHG = Short-handed goals; GWG = Game-winning goals
Pos = Position;GP = Games played; Min, TOI = Minutes played; W = Wins; L = Losses; T,T/OT = Ties; OTL = Overtime losses; GA = Goals-against; GAA = Goals-against average; SO = Shutouts; SA = Shots against; SV = Shots saved;SV% = Save percentage;

== Awards and records ==
Calder Memorial Trophy (Top first-year player): Lorne "Gump" Worsley

The New York Rangers did not have any players chosen for the All-Star Teams for the 1952–53 NHL season.

== Transactions ==
The following is a list of all transactions that occurred for the Rangers during the 1952–53 NHL season. It lists which team each player was traded to and for which player(s) or other consideration(s), if applicable.

August 18, 1952	To Detroit Red Wings Jim Morrison; Reg Sinclair cash	To New York Rangers Leo Reise Jr.
October 8, 1952	To Montreal Canadiens rights to Frank Eddolls	To New York Rangers cash
January 9, 1953	To Chicago Black Hawks cash	To New York Rangers rights to Pete Babando
