= 1952–53 Boston Bruins season =

NHL team season

1952–53 Boston Bruins
- League: 3rd NHL
- 1952–53 record: 28–29–13
- Home record: 19–10–6
- Road record: 9–19–7
- Goals for: 152
- Goals against: 172

Team information
- General manager: Art Ross
- Coach: Lynn Patrick
- Captain: Milt Schmidt
- Arena: Boston Garden

Team leaders
- Goals: Fleming MacKell (27)
- Assists: Milt Schmidt (23)
- Points: Fleming MacKell (44)
- Penalty minutes: Leo Labine (69)
- Wins: Jim Henry
- Goals against average: Jim Henry

The 1952–53 Boston Bruins season was the Bruins' 29th season in the National Hockey League (NHL).

== Regular season ==
=== Final standings ===
National Hockey League
		GP	W	L	T	GF	GA	DIFF	Pts
1	Detroit Red Wings	70	36	16	18	222	133	+89	90
2	Montreal Canadiens	70	28	23	19	155	148	+7	75
3	Boston Bruins	70	28	29	13	152	172	−20	69
4	Chicago Black Hawks	70	27	28	15	169	175	−6	69
5	Toronto Maple Leafs	70	27	30	13	156	167	−11	67
6	New York Rangers	70	17	37	16	152	211	−59	50

=== Record vs. opponents ===
1952–53 NHL Records
Team	BOS	CHI	DET	MTL	NYR	TOR
Boston	—	4–5–5	2–10–2	9–2–3	5–7–2	8–5–1
Chicago	5–4–5	—	3–9–2	3–7–4	10–3–1	6–6–2
Detroit	10–2–2	9–3–2	—	4–4–6	7–3–4	7–4–3
Montreal	2–9–3	7–3–4	4–4–6	—	7–2–5	7–5–2
New York	7–5–2	3–10–1	3–7–4	2–7–5	—	2–8–4
Toronto	5–8–1	6–6–2	4–7–3	5–7–2	8–2–4	—

== Schedule and results ==
1952–53 regular season
October

Game	Result	Date	Score	Opponent	Record
1	T	October 12, 1952	1–1	Montreal Canadiens (1952–53)	0–0–1
2	W	October 16, 1952	2–1	Toronto Maple Leafs (1952–53)	1–0–1
3	L	October 18, 1952	1–2	@ Montreal Canadiens (1952–53)	1–1–1
4	T	October 19, 1952	2–2	New York Rangers (1952–53)	1–1–2
5	T	October 22, 1952	3–3	@ New York Rangers (1952–53)	1–1–3
6	W	October 25, 1952	4–0	@ Toronto Maple Leafs (1952–53)	2–1–3
7	T	October 26, 1952	1–1	@ Chicago Black Hawks (1952–53)	2–1–4
8	L	October 30, 1952	1–4	@ Detroit Red Wings (1952–53)	2–2–4

November

Game	Result	Date	Score	Opponent	Record
9	L	November 1, 1952	2–3	@ Toronto Maple Leafs (1952–53)	2–3–4
10	L	November 2, 1952	1–4	@ Chicago Black Hawks (1952–53)	2–4–4
11	W	November 6, 1952	2–0	Detroit Red Wings (1952–53)	3–4–4
12	W	November 9, 1952	4–1	Chicago Black Hawks (1952–53)	4–4–4
13	W	November 11, 1952	4–0	Toronto Maple Leafs (1952–53)	5–4–4
14	L	November 13, 1952	0–3	@ Detroit Red Wings (1952–53)	5–5–4
15	L	November 15, 1952	0–2	@ Montreal Canadiens (1952–53)	5–6–4
16	L	November 16, 1952	2–5	Detroit Red Wings (1952–53)	5–7–4
17	W	November 19, 1952	2–1	@ Toronto Maple Leafs (1952–53)	6–7–4
18	L	November 20, 1952	1–3	@ Chicago Black Hawks (1952–53)	6–8–4
19	W	November 23, 1952	6–5	Toronto Maple Leafs (1952–53)	7–8–4
20	W	November 27, 1952	3–1	New York Rangers (1952–53)	8–8–4
21	W	November 30, 1952	3–1	Montreal Canadiens (1952–53)	9–8–4

December

Game	Result	Date	Score	Opponent	Record
22	W	December 4, 1952	5–1	Chicago Black Hawks (1952–53)	10–8–4
23	W	December 6, 1952	2–1	@ Montreal Canadiens (1952–53)	11–8–4
24	T	December 7, 1952	1–1	@ Detroit Red Wings (1952–53)	11–8–5
25	W	December 10, 1952	4–1	@ New York Rangers (1952–53)	12–8–5
26	L	December 11, 1952	1–10	Detroit Red Wings (1952–53)	12–9–5
27	T	December 14, 1952	2–2	Chicago Black Hawks (1952–53)	12–9–6
28	L	December 17, 1952	0–5	@ New York Rangers (1952–53)	12–10–6
29	T	December 18, 1952	3–3	@ Chicago Black Hawks (1952–53)	12–10–7
30	W	December 20, 1952	6–3	@ Montreal Canadiens (1952–53)	13–10–7
31	L	December 21, 1952	3–4	Montreal Canadiens (1952–53)	13–11–7
32	L	December 25, 1952	1–2	New York Rangers (1952–53)	13–12–7
33	L	December 27, 1952	0–3	@ Toronto Maple Leafs (1952–53)	13–13–7
34	L	December 28, 1952	1–7	@ Detroit Red Wings (1952–53)	13–14–7

January

Game	Result	Date	Score	Opponent	Record
35	W	January 1, 1953	5–1	Toronto Maple Leafs (1952–53)	14–14–7
36	W	January 3, 1953	1–0	@ Montreal Canadiens (1952–53)	15–14–7
37	L	January 4, 1953	2–5	@ New York Rangers (1952–53)	15–15–7
38	L	January 8, 1953	0–4	@ Detroit Red Wings (1952–53)	15–16–7
39	L	January 10, 1953	1–3	@ Toronto Maple Leafs (1952–53)	15–17–7
40	L	January 11, 1953	2–4	Chicago Black Hawks (1952–53)	15–18–7
41	L	January 15, 1953	0–4	Detroit Red Wings (1952–53)	15–19–7
42	W	January 18, 1953	2–1	Toronto Maple Leafs (1952–53)	16–19–7
43	T	January 22, 1953	3–3	Chicago Black Hawks (1952–53)	16–19–8
44	W	January 24, 1953	9–0	New York Rangers (1952–53)	17–19–8
45	L	January 25, 1953	1–2	New York Rangers (1952–53)	17–20–8
46	T	January 29, 1953	2–2	Toronto Maple Leafs (1952–53)	17–20–9
47	T	January 31, 1953	0–0	@ Montreal Canadiens (1952–53)	17–20–10

February

Game	Result	Date	Score	Opponent	Record
48	W	February 1, 1953	4–3	Montreal Canadiens (1952–53)	18–20–10
49	W	February 5, 1953	4–1	Chicago Black Hawks (1952–53)	19–20–10
50	L	February 8, 1953	3–5	Detroit Red Wings (1952–53)	19–21–10
51	W	February 12, 1953	3–1	Detroit Red Wings (1952–53)	20–21–10
52	W	February 14, 1953	5–4	New York Rangers (1952–53)	21–21–10
53	W	February 15, 1953	1–0	Montreal Canadiens (1952–53)	22–21–10
54	L	February 18, 1953	2–4	@ New York Rangers (1952–53)	22–22–10
55	T	February 21, 1953	2–2	@ Toronto Maple Leafs (1952–53)	22–22–11
56	L	February 22, 1953	0–2	@ Chicago Black Hawks (1952–53)	22–23–11
57	L	February 25, 1953	1–2	@ New York Rangers (1952–53)	22–24–11
58	L	February 27, 1953	0–3	@ Chicago Black Hawks (1952–53)	22–25–11

March

Game	Result	Date	Score	Opponent	Record
59	T	March 1, 1953	2–2	@ Chicago Black Hawks (1952–53)	22–25–12
60	L	March 2, 1953	2–10	@ Detroit Red Wings (1952–53)	22–26–12
61	W	March 5, 1953	5–0	Montreal Canadiens (1952–53)	23–26–12
62	L	March 7, 1953	1–2	New York Rangers (1952–53)	23–27–12
63	W	March 8, 1953	2–1	Chicago Black Hawks (1952–53)	24–27–12
64	T	March 12, 1953	2–2	Detroit Red Wings (1952–53)	24–27–13
65	W	March 14, 1953	3–1	@ Toronto Maple Leafs (1952–53)	25–27–13
66	W	March 15, 1953	2–1	Montreal Canadiens (1952–53)	26–27–13
67	W	March 18, 1953	2–1	@ New York Rangers (1952–53)	27–27–13
68	L	March 19, 1953	1–6	@ Detroit Red Wings (1952–53)	27–28–13
69	W	March 21, 1953	2–1	@ Montreal Canadiens (1952–53)	28–28–13
70	L	March 22, 1953	1–3	Toronto Maple Leafs (1952–53)	28–29–13

Legend: Win (2 points) Loss (0 points) Tie (1 point)

== Player statistics ==
=== Regular season ===
Scoring

Player	Pos	GP	G	A	Pts	PIM
Fleming MacKell	C	65	27	17	44	63
Ed Sandford	LW	61	14	21	35	44
Milt Schmidt	C/D	68	11	23	34	30
Real Chevrefils	LW	69	19	14	33	44
Johnny Peirson	RW	49	14	15	29	32
Joe Klukay	LW	70	13	16	29	20
Jerry Toppazzini	RW	69	10	13	23	36
Leo Labine	RW	51	8	15	23	69
Jack McIntyre	D	70	7	15	22	31
Bill Quackenbush	D	69	2	16	18	6
Pentti Lund	RW	54	8	9	17	2
Dave Creighton	C	45	8	8	16	14
Woody Dumart	LW	62	5	9	14	2
Warren Godfrey	D	60	1	13	14	40
Hal Laycoe	D	54	2	10	12	36
Red Sullivan	C	32	3	8	11	8
Bob Armstrong	D	55	0	8	8	45
Frank Martin	D	14	0	2	2	6
Dunc Fisher	RW	7	0	1	1	0
Norm Corcoran	C/RW	1	0	0	0	0
Jim Henry	G	70	0	0	0	0

Goaltending

Player	MIN	GP	W	L	T	GA	GAA	SO
Jim Henry	4200	70	28	29	13	172	2.46	8
Team:	4200	70	28	29	13	172	2.46	8

=== Playoffs ===
Scoring

Player	Pos	GP	G	A	Pts	PIM
Ed Sandford	LW	11	8	3	11	11
Dave Creighton	C	11	4	5	9	10
Johnny Peirson	RW	11	3	6	9	2
Fleming MacKell	C	11	2	7	9	7
Milt Schmidt	C/D	10	5	1	6	6
Jack McIntyre	D	10	4	2	6	2
Bill Quackenbush	D	11	0	4	4	4
Leo Labine	RW	7	2	1	3	19
Joe Klukay	LW	11	1	2	3	9
Jerry Toppazzini	RW	11	0	3	3	9
Bob Armstrong	D	11	1	1	2	10
Woody Dumart	LW	11	0	2	2	0
Hal Laycoe	D	11	0	2	2	10
Real Chevrefils	LW	7	0	1	1	6
Warren Godfrey	D	11	0	1	1	2
Frank Martin	D	6	0	1	1	2
Gord Henry	G	3	0	0	0	0
Jim Henry	G	9	0	0	0	0
Pentti Lund	RW	2	0	0	0	0
Red Sullivan	C	3	0	0	0	0

Goaltending

Player	MIN	GP	W	L	GA	GAA	SO
Jim Henry	510	9	5	4	26	3.06	0
Gord Henry	163	3	0	2	11	4.05	0
Team:	673	11	5	6	37	3.30	0

Note:

Pos = Position;GP = Games played; G = Goals; A = Assists; Pts = Points; PIM = Penalty minutes; +/- = Plus/minus; PPG = Power-play goals; SHG = Short-handed goals; GWG = Game-winning goals
Pos = Position;GP = Games played; Min, TOI = Minutes played; W = Wins; L = Losses; T,T/OT = Ties; OTL = Overtime losses; GA = Goals-against; GAA = Goals-against average; SO = Shutouts; SA = Shots against; SV = Shots saved;SV% = Save percentage;

== Awards ==
The Boston Bruins did not win any NHL awards for the 1952–53 NHL season.

=== All-Star teams ===
First team	Position
Fleming MacKell	C
Second team	Position
Bill Quackenbush	D

== Transactions ==
The following is a list of all transactions that have occurred for the Boston Bruins during the 1952–53 NHL season. It lists which team each player has been traded to and for which player(s) or other consideration(s), if applicable.

August 14, 1952	To Boston Bruins cash	To Chicago Black Hawks Ed Kryzanowski
September 16, 1952	To Toronto Maple Leafs cash	To Boston Bruins Joe Klukay
October 31, 1952	To Boston Bruins Ed Kryzanowski	To Chicago Black Hawks cash

== See also ==
- 1952–53 NHL season
