= Leon Stickle =

Canadian National Hockey League linesman (1948–2025)

Leon Evan Stickle
- Born: April 20, 1948; Toronto, Ontario, Canada
- Died: November 5, 2025 (aged 77)
- Occupation: NHL official (1969–1998)
- Children: 3

Leon Evan Stickle (April 20, 1948 – November 5, 2025) was a Canadian National Hockey League linesman. His officiating career started in 1969 and ended in 1998.

== Early life ==
Stickle was the son of Ivan Stickle and his wife Bernice, and had a sister Gail. Born in Toronto in 1948, he and his sister and parents moved to Milton, Ontario in 1958.

Stickle played baseball for the Milton Red Sox in the Halton County Intermediate League, and also for the Milton Midgets in 1964.

After playing for the Sarnia Jr. B Legionnaires, Stickle played hockey for his hometown Milton Merchant Juniors, a O.H.A Central Junior C team coached by Milton's first NHL player Enio Sclisizzi in 1965–66 and 1966–67. He led the team in scoring at one point in 1965.

Stickle was also a snooker player, having won a local championship in 1966.

== Officiating career ==
Stickle's first NHL game was on October 17, 1970. During his career (in which he wore a helmet from the mid-1980s until his retirement), he officiated six Stanley Cup finals (1977, 1978, 1980, 1981, 1984 and 1985), 2,069 regular season games, 206 playoff games, two Canada Cups (1981 and 1984), and four All-Star games, including the 1979 Challenge Cup and Rendez-vous '87. From the 1994–95 season until his retirement, he wore uniform number 33.

== 1980 Stanley Cup Finals Game 6 Controversy ==
During Game 6 of the 1980 Stanley Cup, Stickle came under scrutiny for missing an offside goal: During the first period, after entering the offensive zone with the puck, the Islanders' Clark Gillies passed to teammate Butch Goring, who received the pass while he was still in the neutral zone; Goring then carried the puck back into the offensive zone and passed to Sutter, who scored on Flyers goalie Pete Peeters. Gillies was still in the offensive zone when Goring entered the zone with the puck, making the play offsides. The score was tied 1-1 at the time of the goal. The Islanders would go on to win the game in overtime, 5-4, on a Bob Nystrom goal, winning the first of four consecutive Stanley Cups. After the game, Stickle admitted he blew the call.

== Post-linesman career ==
After a 27-year career patrolling the blue lines, Stickle joined the Western Professional Hockey League, where he spent three seasons as supervisor of officials before being named director of officiating in July 2000. In 2003, he was hired as the NHL's supervisor of officials. He left his job at the time as director of hockey operations for the Central Hockey League. Stickle spent 27 seasons as a linesman in the NHL before moving to the CHL.

== Personal life and death ==
During the off-season, Stickle was active with the Ontario and Canadian Special Olympics, and coached minor league baseball. He enjoyed playing golf. He married Nancy Ellen Smith in 1967, and had three children, two daughters, Jayne and Christine, and a son, David.

Stickle died at home on November 5, 2025, at the age of 77.

== Awards ==
In 2007, Stickle was inducted in the inaugural class of the Milton Walk of Fame. In 2019, the Milton Sports Hall of Fame announced that Stickle would be inducted as a builder at its annual induction ceremony.
