= Reg Abbott =

Canadian ice hockey player

- Born: February 4, 1930 (age 96) Winnipeg, Manitoba, Canada
- Height: 5 ft 11 in (180 cm)
- Weight: 155 lb (70 kg; 11 st 1 lb)
- Position: Centre
- Shot: Left
- Played for: Montreal Canadiens
- National team: Canada
- Playing career: 1950–1965

Reginald Stewart Abbott (born February 4, 1930) is a Canadian former professional ice hockey player. Abbott played three games in the National Hockey League (NHL) with the Montreal Canadiens during the 1952–53 season. The rest of his career, which lasted from 1950 to 1965, was mainly spent in the senior Ontario Hockey Association. Internationally Abbott played for Canadian national team at the 1965 World Championships.

== Personal life ==
As a youth in Winnipeg, Abbott played baseball as the second baseman for the provincial champion Rosedales in Manitoba. He also was a near-scratch golfer and a lacrosse player before dedicating his career to ice hockey in his teens.

== Playing career ==
Abbott began his professional career with the Victoria Cougars where he spent four seasons. During this time, he played three games in the National Hockey League in 1952–53 for the Montreal Canadiens. During those three games, he did not score any points nor did he earn any penalty minutes. Apart from three games in the American Hockey League with the Pittsburgh Hornets, Abbott would spend the next five seasons playing senior hockey for the Windsor Bulldogs. Afterward, he would play sparingly with the Winnipeg Maroons and the Clinton Comets before retiring. He played for the Canadian National Team in the 1965 World Championships which finished fourth.

== Awards and achievements ==
- 1949: Turnbull Cup (MJHL) Championship
- 1949: Abbott Cup Championship (1949)
- 1950: MJHL Scoring Leader
- 1950: MJHL Goal Scoring Leader
- 1950: MJHL First All-Star Team
- 1951: President's Cup (PCHL) Championship
- 1964: Allan Cup Championship
- Honoured Member of the Manitoba Hockey Hall of Fame

== Career statistics ==
=== Regular season and playoffs ===
			Regular season					Playoffs
Season	Team	League	GP	G	A	Pts	PIM	GP	G	A	Pts	PIM
1948–49	Brandon Wheat Kings	MJHL	39	16	16	32	6	7	5	1	6	4
1949–50	Brandon Wheat Kings	MJHL	36	27	27	54	24	6	6	7	13	4
1950–51	Victoria Cougars	PCHL	70	14	24	38	29	—	—	—	—	—
1951–52	Victoria Cougars	PCHL	57	16	27	43	30	—	—	—	—	—
1952–53	Victoria Cougars	WHL	65	22	22	44	18	—	—	—	—	—
1952–53	Montreal Canadiens	NHL	3	0	0	0	0	—	—	—	—	—
1953–54	Victoria Cougars	WHL	69	7	17	24	24	3	0	2	2	2
1954–55	Windsor Bulldogs	OHA Sr	48	22	34	56	0	—	—	—	—	—
1954–55	Pittsburgh Hornets	AHL	3	0	0	0	2	—	—	—	—	—
1955–56	Windsor Bulldogs	OHA Sr	48	20	24	44	0	—	—	—	—	—
1956–57	Windsor Bulldogs	OHA Sr	52	21	26	47	0	—	—	—	—	—
1957–58	Windsor Bulldogs	OHA Sr	35	6	12	18	10	—	—	—	—	—
1958–59	Windsor Bulldogs	OHA Sr	8	1	1	2	4	—	—	—	—	—
1962–63	Winnipeg Maroons	SSHL	11	9	10	19	2	—	—	—	—	—
1963–64	Clinton Comets	EHL	10	2	3	5	6	—	—	—	—	—
1964–65	Winnipeg Maroons	SSHL	6	6	6	12	2	—	—	—	—	—
NHL totals			3	0	0	0	0	—	—	—	—	—

=== International ===
Year	Team	Event	GP	G	A	Pts	PIM
1965	Canada	WC	7	2	2	4	0
Senior totals			7	2	2	4	0
