= Ralph Almas =

Canadian ice hockey player

- Born: April 26, 1924; Saskatoon, Saskatchewan, Canada
- Died: May 13, 2001 (aged 77); Regina, Saskatchewan, Canada
- Height: 5 ft 9 in (175 cm)
- Weight: 160 lb (73 kg; 11 st 6 lb)
- Position: Goaltender
- Caught: Right
- Played for: Detroit Red Wings; Chicago Black Hawks
- Playing career: 1945–1955

Ralph Clayton Almas, better known as Red Almas (April 26, 1924 — May 13, 2001), was a Canadian ice hockey goaltender. He played 3 games in the National Hockey League with the Detroit Red Wings and Chicago Black Hawks between 1947 and 1952. The rest of his career, which lasted from 1945 to 1955, was spent in various minor leagues. He wore the jersey number "1".

== Career statistics ==
=== Regular season and playoffs ===
			Regular season								Playoffs
Season	Team	League	GP	W	L	T	Min	GA	SO	GAA	GP	W	L	T	Min	GA	SO	GAA
1941–42	Saskatoon Junior Quakers	SJHL	8	6	2	0	490	22	0	2.69	6	4	1	1	360	22	0	3.67
1941–42	Saskatoon Junior Quakers	M-Cup	—	—	—	—	—	—	—	—	3	0	2	1	190	12	0	3.79
1942–43	Windsor Chryslers	MOHL	2	—	—	—	120	8	0	4.00	—	—	—	—	—	—	—	—
1943–44	Saskatoon Navy	N-SSHL	17	16	1	0	1030	71	0	4.14	4	1	3	0	240	21	0	5.25
1945–46	Saskatoon Elks	WCSHL	35	14	19	2	2160	147	1	4.08	3	0	3	0	180	14	0	4.67
1946–47	Detroit Red Wings	NHL	1	0	1	0	60	5	0	5.00	5	1	3	—	259	13	0	3.02
1946–47	Indianapolis Capitals	AHL	64	33	18	13	3640	215	3	3.36	—	—	—	—	—	—	—	—
1947–48	Indianapolis Capitals	AHL	65	31	28	6	3890	246	0	3.79	—	—	—	—	—	—	—	—
1948–49	St. Louis Flyers	AHL	66	39	18	9	3920	189	5	2.89	7	3	4	—	465	22	0	2.84
1949–50	St. Louis Flyers	AHL	55	29	21	5	3300	182	4	3.31	2	0	2	—	120	10	0	5.00
1950–51	Chicago Black Hawks	NHL	1	0	1	0	60	5	0	5.00	—	—	—	—	—	—	—	—
1950–51	St. Louis Flyers	AHL	70	32	34	4	4280	251	3	3.52	—	—	—	—	—	—	—	—
1951–52	St. Louis Flyers	AHL	68	28	39	1	4100	262	2	3.83	—	—	—	—	—	—	—	—
1952–53	Detroit Red Wings	NHL	1	0	0	1	60	3	0	3.00	—	—	—	—	—	—	—	—
1952–53	St. Louis Flyers	AHL	53	23	29	1	3200	200	1	3.75	—	—	—	—	—	—	—	—
1953–54	Buffalo Bisons	AHL	9	4	5	0	540	45	0	5.00	—	—	—	—	—	—	—	—
1953–54	Victoria Cougars	WHL	56	20	26	10	3360	174	2	3.10	—	—	—	—	—	—	—	—
1954–55	Calgary Stampeders	WHL	2	1	0	1	120	9	0	4.50	—	—	—	—	—	—	—	—
AHL totals			450	219	192	39	26,870	1590	18	3.55	9	3	6	—	585	32	0	3.28
NHL totals			3	0	2	1	180	13	0	4.33	5	1	3	—	259	13	0	3.02

== Trades ==
- Traded by Detroit Red Wings (with Barry Sullivan, Lloyd Doran, Tony Licari and Thain Simon) to Chicago Black Hawks for Hec Highton and Joe Lund on September 9, 1948.
- Traded by Chicago (with Guyle Fielder and Steve Hrymnak) to Detroit Red Wings for financial compensation on September 23, 1952.

== Awards ==
- Named to American Hockey League All-Star Second Team, 1948-49.
