= Hal Murphy =

Canadian ice hockey player

- Born: July 6, 1927; Montreal, Quebec, Canada
- Died: October 11, 1976 (aged 49); Beaconsfield, Quebec, Canada
- Height: 5 ft 9 in (175 cm)
- Weight: 140 lb (64 kg; 10 st 0 lb)
- Position: Goaltender
- Caught: Right
- Played for: Montreal Canadiens
- Playing career: 1952–1954

Harold Aloysius Murphy (July 6, 1927 – October 11, 1976) was a Canadian ice hockey goaltender. He played one game in the National Hockey League with the Montreal Canadiens during the 1952–53 season. Loaned from the minor league Montreal Royals of the Quebec Senior Hockey League, Murphy replaced the Canadiens regular goalie Gerry McNeil on November 8, 1952, against the Chicago Black Hawks. He helped the Canadiens win the game, 6–4.

== Career statistics ==
=== Regular season and playoffs ===
			Regular season								Playoffs
Season	Team	League	GP	W	L	T	MIN	GA	SO	GAA	GP	W	L	MIN	GA	SO	GAA
1952–53	Montreal Canadiens	NHL	1	1	0	0	60	4	0	4.00	—	—	—	—	—	—	—
1952–53	Montreal Royals	QSHL	3	2	1	0	180	6	0	1.00	—	—	—	—	—	—	—
1953–54	Sir George Williams University	QUAA	—	—	—	—	—	—	—	—	—	—	—	—	—	—	—
1953–54	Ottawa Senators	QSHL	3	2	1	0	180	11	0	3.67	—	—	—	—	—	—	—
NHL totals			1	1	0	0	60	4	0	4.00	—	—	—	—	—	—	—

== See also ==
- List of players who played only one game in the NHL
