= Hy Buller =

Canadian ice hockey player (1926-1968)

- Born: March 15, 1926 Montreal, Quebec, Canada
- Died: August 3, 1968 (aged 42) Cleveland, Ohio, U.S.
- Height: 5 ft 11 in (180 cm)
- Weight: 183 lb (83 kg; 13 st 1 lb)
- Position: Defence
- Shot: Left
- Played for: Detroit Red Wings; New York Rangers
- Playing career: 1943–1953

Hyman Buller (March 15, 1926 – August 3, 1968) was a Canadian ice hockey defenceman. Nicknamed the "Blueline Blaster" because of his penchant for hitting opposing players above the skate toe and below the pads, Buller was one of two Jewish professional hockey players in the 1940s and 1950s.

He was on the Eastern Amateur Hockey League’s (EAHL) Second All-Star Team in 1943, the American Hockey League’s (AHL) First All-Star Team in 1949 and 1951, the National Hockey League’s (NHL) Second All-Star Team in 1952, and he played in the 1952 NHL All-Star Game. Buller was greatly admired by hockey legends Gordie Howe and Maurice Richard, and other contemporaries not only for his solid plays but also for his good sportsmanship. He played in five NHL seasons, first for the Detroit Red Wings and later for the New York Rangers, before retiring in 1954. He died from cancer in 1968.

== Biography ==
Hy Buller’s father, Nathan Buller, immigrated to Canada in 1893 from Wiznitz, Bukovina, which was at that time a part of the Austro-Hungarian Empire and is now shared by Romania and Ukraine. The Buller family originally settled in Montreal, Quebec where they ran a cleaning and pressing business. In 1919, Nathan married Goldie Goldenberg. Following a tragic explosion at the shop that killed Nathan’s brother, the Bullers left the garment business and moved to Saskatoon, Saskatchewan in 1929 to join their relatives.

Winters in Saskatoon were devoted to hockey. Buller’s love of the sport developed in his uncle's flooded and frozen vacant lot. Many of the local boys played a form of hockey called shinny, or street hockey, and in 1937 the first artificial ice arena opened in Saskatchewan and the boys soon formed leagues. Buller moved quickly up the ranks throughout his childhood and teen years, often playing alongside older and more experienced team members. However, his athletic abilities were recognized and desired by coaches early on. Aside from ice hockey, Buller also participated in football, baseball, basketball, golf, swimming, and track and field; earning many awards.

In David A. Schwartz’s article "A Mensch on Defense – The Hy Buller Story" from the Jewish Historical Society of British Columbia's journal The Scribe, he describes how in the 1930s and ‘40s, there was one team in Saskatoon that scouts would come to see. The boys in this club were required to attend weekly church services and Buller, as a Jew, was not eligible to join. However, Buller’s natural abilities were too exceptional to overlook and in 1942, at the age of 16, he was offered a spot in the New York Rangers’ Winnipeg training camp. Buller's parents were hesitant at first because he was an excellent student. He had graduated two years early and could easily have gone to university. But Buller's zeal for hockey could not be shaken and in the fall of 1942 he began playing with for the Eastern Amateur Hockey League’s New York Rovers along with two other Saskatoon boys, Vic Lynn and David Livingston.

After one season with the New York Rovers, Buller made his debut in the National Hockey League with the Detroit Red Wings. In 1944, there were only six teams in the NHL so space was limited; because of this Buller was demoted to the American Hockey League in the 1944–45 season. He was sold to the Hershey Bears and played for them for three seasons, during which they were runners-up for the pennant twice before eventually winning the title in 1946–47. Buller was traded to the Cleveland Barons mid-season and helped them set a league record of thirty undefeated games, as well as win the championship. Buller spent a total of eight years in the American Hockey League. In his final year with the Cleveland Barons, they won the Calder Cup, and Buller, who at that time held the record for most all-time points scored by a defenceman, was awarded a spot on the AHL All-Star Team, a position he had held a couple of years before in 1948–1949.

In 1951 Buller was traded to the New York Rangers, and after much deliberation moved his young family to the city. In his first year, Buller played defence alongside Allan Stanley and his performance matched the Rangers’ record for a defenceman. He won the West Side Association of Commerce Trophy as the Rangers’ most valuable player and came in second for the Calder Memorial Trophy; he was also the first rookie defenceman to be chosen for the Rangers’ All-Star second team.

Buller's connection to the large Jewish population in New York was used by the Rangers’ management to attract a new audience to the home games. Banners emblazoned with the Star of David were hung from Madison Square Garden and his faith was frequently reinforced by sports writers.

In 1954, Buller was traded to the Montreal Canadiens but before the season began he announced his retirement from hockey. David A. Schwartz, Buller's nephew, discounts theories that Buller retired because the game was too violent, in his article "A Mensch on Defense – The Hy Buller Story" from the Jewish Historical Society of British Columbia's journal The Scribe. Schwartz discovered that Buller retired mostly because he did not want to uproot his family again but also because an NHL salary was not substantial. His physical condition was weakened as a result of the injuries he had suffered throughout his career.

Buller was married to Elaine Witten for 22 years and they had three sons, Bob, Bruce, and Jeff.

The Buller Family returned to Cleveland for a few years where Hy worked as a salesman before moving to Vancouver, British Columbia in 1962 where he coached several amateur hockey teams. In 1965 Buller was diagnosed with cancer. He and his wife decided to move back to Cleveland, and in 1968 he died of cancer.

Nine years after his death, he was inducted into the Greater Cleveland Sports Hall of Fame.

On July 4, 2017, Buller was inducted into the International Jewish Sports Hall of Fame at the Wingate Institute, Netanya, Israel.

The Jewish Museum and Archives of British Columbia has an extensive collection of records related to the career and family of Buller.

== Career statistics ==
=== Regular season and playoffs ===
			Regular season					Playoffs
Season	Team	League	GP	G	A	Pts	PIM	GP	G	A	Pts	PIM
1941–42	Saskatoon Jr. Quakers	N-SJHL	8	3	5	8	27	6	6	2	8	28
1941–42	Saskatoon Jr. Quakers	M-Cup	—	—	—	—	—	3	1	1	2	14
1942–43	New York Rovers	EAHL	41	11	14	25	61	9	1	2	3	14
1943–44	Detroit Red Wings	NHL	7	0	3	3	4	—	—	—	—	—
1943–44	Indianapolis Capitals	AHL	46	6	12	18	51	5	2	1	3	2
1944–45	Detroit Red Wings	NHL	2	0	0	0	2	—	—	—	—	—
1944–45	Hershey Bears	AHL	41	5	17	22	44	11	1	2	3	6
1945–46	Hershey Bears	AHL	59	8	19	27	61	3	0	0	0	2
1946–47	Hershey Bears	AHL	63	12	32	44	56	11	3	3	6	8
1947–48	Hershey Bears	AHL	31	5	12	17	31	—	—	—	—	—
1947–48	Cleveland Barons	AHL	36	10	21	31	55	8	1	2	3	2
1948–49	Cleveland Barons	AHL	62	7	30	37	44	5	0	7	7	6
1949–50	Cleveland Barons	AHL	43	10	19	29	32	9	0	3	3	10
1950–51	Cleveland Barons	AHL	66	16	41	57	31	11	1	4	5	11
1951–52	New York Rangers	NHL	68	12	23	35	96	—	—	—	—	—
1952–53	New York Rangers	NHL	70	7	18	25	73	—	—	—	—	—
1953–54	New York Rangers	NHL	41	3	14	17	40	—	—	—	—	—
1953–54	Saskatoon Quakers	WHL	27	4	10	14	36	11	1	4	5	11
AHL totals			447	79	203	282	405	63	8	22	30	47
NHL totals			188	22	58	80	215	—	—	—	—	—

== See also ==
- List of select Jewish ice hockey players
