= Michel Labadie =

Canadian ice hockey player

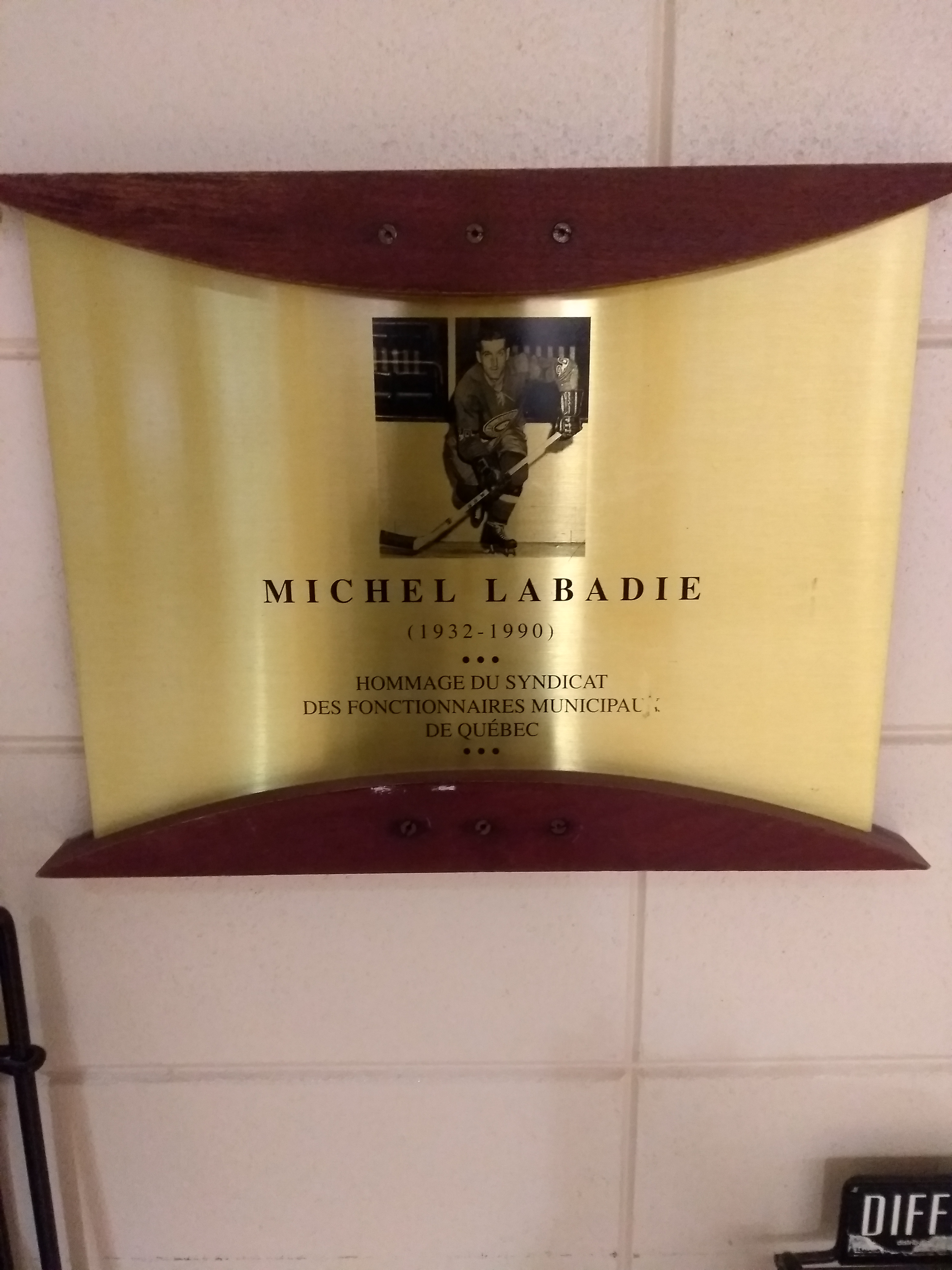
- Born: August 17, 1932 Saint-François-d'Assise, Quebec, Canada
- Died: April 17, 1990 (aged 57) Quebec, Canada
- Height: 5 ft 11 in (180 cm)
- Weight: 170 lb (77 kg; 12 st 2 lb)
- Position: Right wing
- Shot: Right
- Played for: New York Rangers
- Playing career: 1953–1969

Michel Joseph Gilles Labadie (August 17, 1932 – April 17, 1990) was a Canadian professional ice hockey player. He played three games in the National Hockey League with the New York Rangers during the 1952–53 season. The rest of his career, which lasted from 1953 to 1969, was spent in the minor leagues.

== Career statistics ==
=== Regular season and playoffs ===
			Regular season					Playoffs
Season	Team	League	GP	G	A	Pts	PIM	GP	G	A	Pts	PIM
1950–51	Quebec Citadelles Bees	QJHL-B	10	6	8	14	11	—	—	—	—	—
1950–51	Quebec Citadelles	QJHL	2	0	1	1	0	—	—	—	—	—
1951–52	Quebec Citadelles	QJHL	50	34	43	77	31	15	6	7	13	6
1952–53	New York Rangers	NHL	3	0	0	0	0	—	—	—	—	—
1952–53	Quebec Citadelles	QJHL	47	35	43	78	60	9	3	8	11	9
1952–53	Quebec Citadelles	M-Cup	—	—	—	—	—	8	4	6	10	28
1953–54	Quebec Aces	QSHL	67	20	24	44	32	16	5	5	10	2
1954–55	Quebec Aces	QSHL	55	19	38	57	11	8	1	5	6	4
1955–56	Quebec Aces	QSHL	61	18	21	39	35	7	4	3	7	0
1956–57	Quebec Aces	QSHL	65	18	34	52	22	10	2	1	3	0
1957–58	Quebec Aces	QSHL	64	22	30	52	10	12	5	9	14	0
1958–59	Quebec Aces	QSHL	10	4	3	7	2	—	—	—	—	—
1958–59	Cleveland Barons	AHL	59	23	35	58	16	7	0	2	2	2
1959–60	Cleveland Barons	AHL	72	24	22	46	20	7	1	5	6	2
1960–61	Quebec Aces	AHL	66	21	37	58	10	—	—	—	—	—
1961–62	Quebec Aces	AHL	56	17	22	39	8	—	—	—	—	—
1962–63	Quebec Aces	AHL	72	15	24	39	20	—	—	—	—	—
1963–64	Springfield Indians	AHL	70	31	34	65	12	—	—	—	—	—
1964–65	Springfield Indians	AHL	55	19	21	40	19	—	—	—	—	—
1965–66	Victoria Maple Leafs	WHL	72	8	21	29	14	14	4	3	7	4
1966–67	Victoria Maple Leafs	WHL	48	10	15	25	9	—	—	—	—	—
1967–68	Buffalo Bisons	AHL	70	23	30	53	16	5	1	3	4	2
1968–69	Buffalo Bisons	AHL	6	0	1	1	0	—	—	—	—	—
AHL totals			526	173	226	399	121	19	2	10	12	6
NHL totals			3	0	0	0	0	—	—	—	—	—
