= Enio Sclisizzi =

Canadian ice hockey player (1925-2012)

- Born: August 1, 1925 Milton, Ontario, Canada
- Died: June 27, 2012 (aged 86) Milton, Ontario, Canada
- Height: 5 ft 10 in (178 cm)
- Weight: 168 lb (76 kg; 12 st 0 lb)
- Position: Left wing
- Shot: Left
- Played for: Detroit Red Wings; Chicago Black Hawks
- Playing career: 1946–1959

Enio James Sclisizzi (August 1, 1925 – June 27, 2012) was a Canadian professional ice hockey player. Sclisizzi played 81 games in the National Hockey League with the Detroit Red Wings and Chicago Black Hawks between 1947 and 1953. Sclisizzi won the Stanley Cup in 1952 with Detroit. When the cup was redone during the 1957–58 season, for some reason his name was omitted from the new version, but his name can still be seen on the original 1952 Detroit team engraving in the Hockey Hall of Fame.

== Career ==
In 1942, the Milton Bricks Tigers won an Ontario Hockey Association Junior "C" title. Milton defeated Oakville to advance to the semi-finals and Parry Sound to move on to the finals against the Preston Riversides. In the Schmalz Cup best of three series, which was held at Maple Leaf Gardens, Milton won game one by a score of 6–4, with three goals coming from Milton's future NHL player Enio Schlisizzi, and game two by a score of 10–1.

Sclisizzi made his professional debut in the 1946–47 season for the Indianapolis Capitals American Hockey League (AHL) affiliate of the Detroit Red Wings. He made his NHL debut with the Red Wings on April 5, 1947, against the Toronto Maple Leafs during the 1947 Stanley Cup playoffs. Sclisizzi made his regular-season NHL debut on opening day October 15, 1947, but he was sent down to the AHL. Sclisizzi returned to the NHL on March 20, 1948, scoring his first NHL goal in the second period in a game against Toronto. In total, he played 67 regular-season games in the NHL with the Wings. In August 1952, he was traded to the Chicago Black Hawks organization. He played 14 games for the Black Hawks that 1952–53 season but did not play in the NHL again. He spent most of his career in the AHL and the Western Hockey League (WHL). He was a member of the 1950 Calder Cup champion Indianapolis Capitals.

== Post career ==
Sclisizzi returned to Milton and coached several local hockey players like future NHL linesman Leon Stickle on teams such as the Milton Merchant Juniors of the OHA Central Junior C league in 1965.

== Personal ==
Sclisizzi fought in World War II. He died in 2012, aged 86.

John Tonelli's mother was Joy Sclisizzi of Milton, which makes Tonelli a cousin of Sclisizzi.

== Career statistics ==
=== Regular season and playoffs ===
| | | | Regular season | | | | | Playoffs |
| Season | Team | League | GP | G | A | Pts | PIM | GP | G | A | Pts | PIM |
|---|---|---|---|---|---|---|---|---|---|---|---|---|
| 1941–42 | Milton Bombers | OHA-B | — | — | — | — | — | — | — | — | — | — |
| 1942–43 | Toronto Red Indians | TIHL | 14 | 7 | 10 | 17 | 2 | — | — | — | — | — |
| 1942–43 | Toronto Marlboros | OHA | 1 | 0 | 0 | 0 | 0 | — | — | — | — | — |
| 1942–43 | Milton Bombers | OHA-B | — | — | — | — | — | 10 | 10 | 10 | 20 | 15 |
| 1943–44 | Stratford Kroehlers | OHA | 23 | 17 | 14 | 31 | 40 | — | — | — | — | — |
| 1943–44 | Hamilton Whizzers | OHA | — | — | — | — | — | 2 | 2 | 2 | 4 | 0 |
| 1944–45 | Cornwallis Navy | OHA Sr | — | — | — | — | — | — | — | — | — | — |
| 1945–46 | Stratford Indians | OHA Sr | 14 | 6 | 5 | 11 | 2 | 5 | 5 | 4 | 9 | 4 |
| 1945–46 | Toronto Bowsers | TMHL | 2 | 1 | 1 | 2 | 5 | 10 | 9 | 13 | 22 | 8 |
| 1946–47 | Indianapolis Capitals | AHL | 60 | 20 | 14 | 34 | 45 | — | — | — | — | — |
| 1946–47 | Detroit Red Wings | NHL | — | — | — | — | — | 1 | 0 | 0 | 0 | 0 |
| 1947–48 | Indianapolis Capitals | AHL | 61 | 29 | 38 | 67 | 58 | — | — | — | — | — |
| 1947–48 | Detroit Red Wings | NHL | 4 | 1 | 0 | 1 | 0 | 6 | 0 | 0 | 0 | 4 |
| 1948–49 | Indianapolis Capitals | AHL | 12 | 3 | 7 | 10 | 6 | — | — | — | — | — |
| 1948–49 | Detroit Red Wings | NHL | 50 | 9 | 8 | 17 | 24 | 6 | 0 | 0 | 0 | 2 |
| 1949–50 | Indianapolis Capitals | AHL | 62 | 19 | 26 | 45 | 47 | 8 | 1 | 4 | 5 | 7 |
| 1949–50 | Detroit Red Wings | NHL | 4 | 0 | 0 | 0 | 2 | — | — | — | — | — |
| 1950–51 | Indianapolis Capitals | AHL | 64 | 30 | 36 | 66 | 43 | 3 | 2 | 0 | 2 | 0 |
| 1951–52 | Indianapolis Capitals | AHL | 55 | 24 | 34 | 58 | 35 | — | — | — | — | — |
| 1951–52 | Detroit Red Wings | NHL | 9 | 2 | 1 | 3 | 0 | — | — | — | — | — |
| 1952–53 | Calgary Stampeders | WHL | 16 | 12 | 11 | 23 | 12 | 5 | 5 | 2 | 7 | 4 |
| 1952–53 | St. Louis Flyers | AHL | 10 | 4 | 4 | 8 | 2 | — | — | — | — | — |
| 1952–53 | Chicago Black Hawks | NHL | 14 | 0 | 2 | 2 | 0 | — | — | — | — | — |
| 1953–54 | Edmonton Flyers | WHL | 70 | 28 | 36 | 64 | 46 | 13 | 6 | 4 | 10 | 8 |
| 1954–55 | Edmonton Flyers | WHL | 59 | 29 | 24 | 53 | 50 | 9 | 0 | 5 | 5 | 12 |
| 1955–56 | Buffalo Bisons | AHL | 60 | 18 | 28 | 46 | 56 | 5 | 1 | 3 | 4 | 2 |
| 1956–57 | Calgary Stampeders | WHL | 67 | 26 | 24 | 50 | 42 | 3 | 2 | 0 | 2 | 2 |
| 1957–58 | Calgary Stampeders | WHL | 68 | 22 | 15 | 37 | 19 | 14 | 5 | 3 | 8 | 16 |
| 1958–59 | Vancouver Canucks | WHL | 60 | 12 | 29 | 41 | 22 | 3 | 1 | 1 | 2 | 2 |
| AHL totals | | | 384 | 147 | 187 | 334 | 292 | 16 | 4 | 7 | 11 | 9 |
| WHL totals | | | 340 | 129 | 139 | 268 | 191 | 47 | 19 | 15 | 34 | 44 |
| NHL totals | | | 81 | 12 | 11 | 23 | 26 | 13 | 0 | 0 | 0 | 6 |

== Awards ==
- 1951–52 – AHL First Team All-Star
