= Gus Mortson =

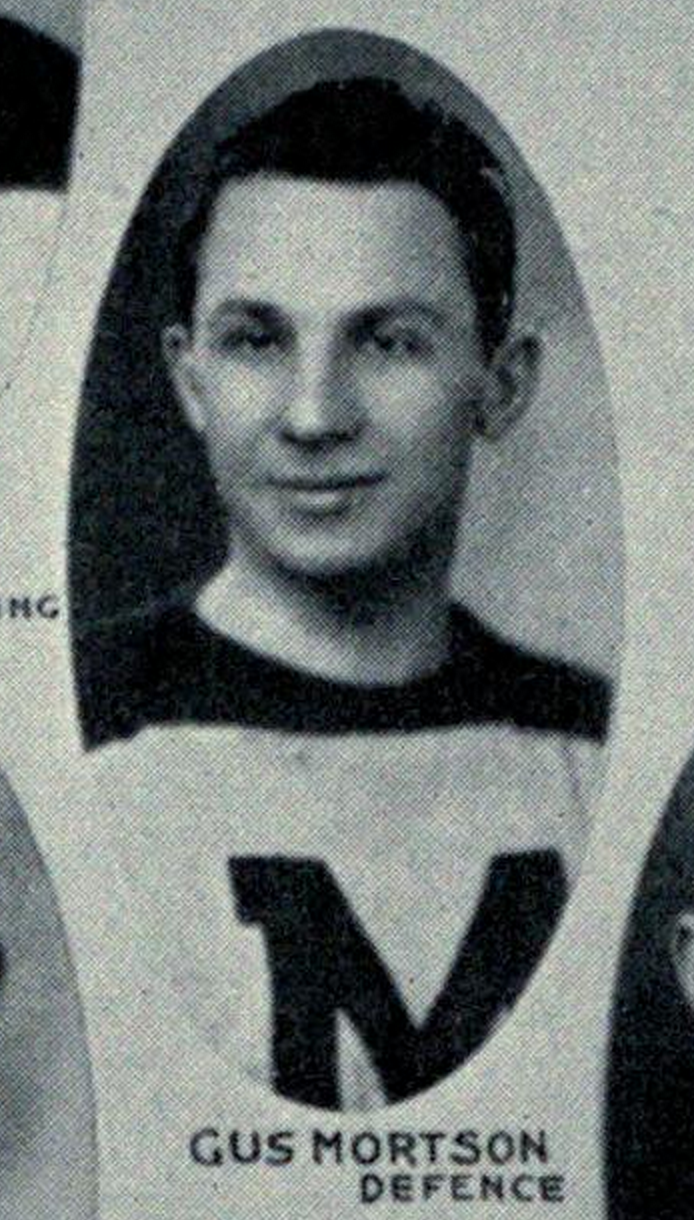
- Mortson, c. 1944
- Born: January 24, 1925 New Liskeard, Ontario, Canada
- Died: August 8, 2015 (aged 90) Timmins, Ontario, Canada
- Height: 5 ft 11 in (180 cm)
- Weight: 190 lb (86 kg; 13 st 8 lb)
- Position: Defence
- Shot: Left
- Played for: Toronto Maple Leafs; Chicago Black Hawks; Detroit Red Wings
- Playing career: 1945–1967

James Angus Gerald "Old Hardrock" Mortson (January 24, 1925 – August 8, 2015) was a Canadian ice hockey defenceman in the National Hockey League (NHL). He played for the Toronto Maple Leafs, Chicago Black Hawks, and Detroit Red Wings, winning four Stanley Cups with Toronto. He also played in eight NHL All-Star Games.

== Early career ==
Mortson grew up in Kirkland Lake, Ontario. He joined the St. Michael's Majors of the Ontario Hockey Association Jr. league in 1943–44 and played two seasons for them. He then turned professional and played for the United States Hockey League's Tulsa Oilers in 1945–46, compiling 48 points in 51 games.

== National Hockey League ==
In 1946–47 Mortson joined the NHL's Toronto Maple Leafs, where he played for the next six seasons. He and fellow defenceman Jim Thomson were known as the "Gold Dust Twins", and the two helped the Maple Leafs win Stanley Cups in 1947, 1948, 1949, and 1951. In the 1948 All-Star game, Mortson and Gordie Howe squared off and, as of 2015, are the only players to fight in an NHL All-Star Game. In 1950, Mortson was named to the league's first all-star team.

In 1952 Mortson was traded to the Chicago Black Hawks, along with Cal Gardner, Ray Hannigan, and Al Rollins, for Harry Lumley. Mortson played for the Black Hawks for six seasons. In 1956–57 he led the league in penalty minutes for the fourth time. He was then traded to the Detroit Red Wings in 1958 and played one season for them. Mortson played 797 games and had 198 points and 1,380 penalty minutes in his 13-year NHL career. He was known for his physical play and got into numerous fights.

== Later career ==
After his NHL career ended, Mortson played professional hockey with the American Hockey League's Buffalo Bisons, and retired in 1967 while playing semi-professional with the Oakville Oaks of the Ontario Hockey Association Senior A League.

== Post-hockey and death ==
After retirement from hockey Mortson was involved in the food and beverage business and lived in Oakville, Ontario. In 1970, he moved to Timmins becoming a stockbroker and later as a mining company representative. He died in Timmins, Ontario, on August 8, 2015. He was 90 years old, survived by his wife Sheila and six children, and predeceased by one son.

== Awards and achievements ==
- 1947 Stanley Cup Championship (Toronto)
- 1948 Stanley Cup Championship (Toronto)
- 1949 Stanley Cup Championship (Toronto)
- 1951 Stanley Cup Championship (Toronto)
- 1947 NHL All-Star (Toronto)
- 1948 NHL All-Star (Toronto)
- 1950 NHL All-Star (Toronto)
- 1951 NHL All-Star (Toronto)
- 1952 NHL All-Star (Toronto)
- 1953 NHL All-Star (Chicago)
- 1954 NHL All-Star (Chicago)
- 1956 NHL All-Star (Chicago)

== Career statistics ==
=== Regular season and playoffs ===
Bold indicates led league

			Regular season					Playoffs
Season	Team	League	GP	G	A	Pts	PIM	GP	G	A	Pts	PIM
1942–43	Kirkland Lake Lakers	GBHL	—	—	—	—	—	—	—	—	—	—
1943–44	Toronto St. Michael's Majors	OHA	25	5	11	16	16	12	2	2	4	12
1943–44	Oshawa Generals	M-Cup	—	—	—	—	—	8	1	4	5	4
1944–45	Toronto St. Michael's Majors	OHA	17	6	12	18	18	6	1	5	6	8
1944–45	Toronto St. Michael's Majors	M-Cup	—	—	—	—	—	14	6	4	10	12
1945–46	Tulsa Oilers	USHL	51	19	29	48	47	13	1	5	6	12
1946–47	Toronto Maple Leafs	NHL	60	5	13	18	**133**	11	1	3	4	22
1947–48	Toronto Maple Leafs	NHL	58	7	11	18	118	5	1	2	3	2
1948–49	Toronto Maple Leafs	NHL	60	2	13	15	85	9	2	1	3	8
1949–50	Toronto Maple Leafs	NHL	68	3	14	17	125	7	0	0	0	18
1950–51	Toronto Maple Leafs	NHL	60	3	10	13	**142**	11	0	1	1	4
1951–52	Toronto Maple Leafs	NHL	65	1	10	11	106	4	0	0	0	8
1952–53	Chicago Black Hawks	NHL	68	5	18	23	88	7	1	1	2	6
1953–54	Chicago Black Hawks	NHL	68	5	13	18	**132**	—	—	—	—	—
1954–55	Chicago Black Hawks	NHL	65	2	11	13	133	—	—	—	—	—
1955–56	Chicago Black Hawks	NHL	52	5	10	15	87	—	—	—	—	—
1956–57	Chicago Black Hawks	NHL	70	5	18	23	**147**	—	—	—	—	—
1957–58	Chicago Black Hawks	NHL	67	3	10	13	62	—	—	—	—	—
1958–59	Detroit Red Wings	NHL	36	0	1	1	22	—	—	—	—	—
1958–59	Buffalo Bisons	AHL	29	3	9	12	46	11	3	3	6	12
1959–60	Buffalo Bisons	AHL	72	10	32	42	37	—	—	—	—	—
1962–63	Chatham Maroons	OHA-Sr.	36	11	14	25	46	9	1	1	2	6
1963–64	Chatham Maroons	IHL	29	2	14	16	60	—	—	—	—	—
1964–65	Oakville Oaks	OHA-Sr.	31	7	18	25	78	11	1	5	6	18
1964–65	Buffalo Bisons	AHL	3	0	3	3	0	—	—	—	—	—
1965–66	Oakville Oaks	OHA-Sr.	27	7	15	22	48	7	0	2	2	2
1966–67	Oakville Oaks	OHA-Sr.	13	3	3	6	8	—	—	—	—	—
NHL totals			797	46	152	198	1380	54	5	8	13	68

Preceded by Bill Gadsby	Chicago Black Hawks captain 1954–57	Succeeded by Ed Litzenberger
