= Ed Kryzanowski =

Canadian ice hockey player

- Born: November 14, 1925; Fort Frances, Ontario, Canada
- Died: April 29, 2007 (aged 81); Atikokan, Ontario, Canada
- Height: 5 ft 11 in (180 cm)
- Weight: 178 lb (81 kg; 12 st 10 lb)
- Position: Defence
- Shot: Right
- Played for: Boston Bruins; Chicago Black Hawks
- Playing career: 1948–1960

Edward Lloyd "Sonny" Kryzanowski (November 14, 1925 – April 29, 2007) was a Canadian ice hockey player who played 237 games in the National Hockey League with the Boston Bruins and Chicago Black Hawks between 1948 and 1953.

== Career statistics ==
=== Regular season and playoffs ===
			Regular season					Playoffs
Season	Team	League	GP	G	A	Pts	PIM	GP	G	A	Pts	PIM
1943–44	Fort Francis Maple Leafs	TBSHL	—	—	—	—	—	—	—	—	—	—
1943–44	Fort Francis Maple Leafs	Al-Cup	—	—	—	—	—	2	0	1	1	2
1944–45	Cornwallis Nacy	NNDHL	—	—	—	—	—	—	—	—	—	—
1945–46	University of Toronto	CIAUC	6	1	3	4	4	1	0	0	0	2
1946–47	University of Toronto	CIAUH	9	4	11	15	10	1	0	1	1	0
1947–48	University of Toronto	CIAUH	12	10	12	22	12	1	2	0	2	0
1947–48	Fort Francis Canadians	TBSHL	—	—	—	—	—	—	—	—	—	—
1948–49	Boston Bruins	NHL	36	1	3	4	10	5	0	1	1	2
1948–49	Hershey Bears	AHL	18	0	8	8	6	—	—	—	—	—
1949–50	Boston Bruins	NHL	57	6	10	16	12	—	—	—	—	—
1949–50	Hershey Bears	AHL	10	1	1	2	4	—	—	—	—	—
1950–51	Boston Bruins	NHL	69	3	6	9	10	6	0	0	0	2
1951–52	Boston Bruins	NHL	70	5	3	8	33	7	0	0	0	0
1952–53	Chicago Black Hawks	NHL	5	0	0	0	0	—	—	—	—	—
1952–53	Providence Reds	AHL	51	5	26	31	19	—	—	—	—	—
1953–54	Providence Reds	AHL	70	2	14	16	37	—	—	—	—	—
1954–55	Hershey Bears	AHL	60	7	14	21	37	—	—	—	—	—
1955–56	Hershey Bears	AHL	64	9	26	35	53	—	—	—	—	—
AHL totals			273	24	89	113	156	—	—	—	—	—
NHL totals			237	15	22	37	65	18	0	1	1	4
