= Guyle Fielder =

American-born Canadian ice hockey player (1930–2026)

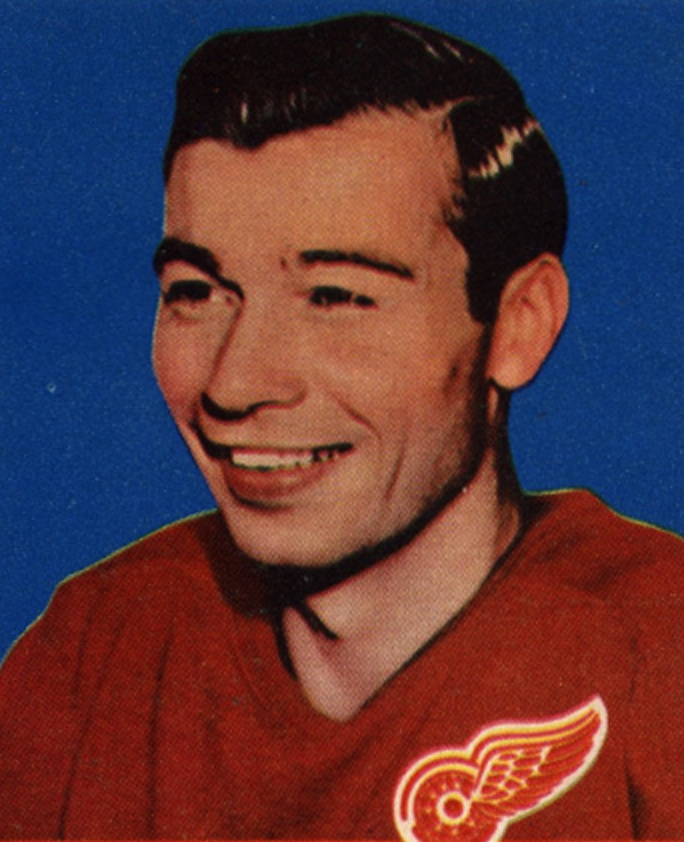
- Fielder on a 1957 Topps card
- Born: November 21, 1930 Potlatch, Idaho, U.S.
- Died: February 21, 2026 (aged 95) Arizona, U.S.
- Height: 5 ft 9 in (175 cm)
- Weight: 160 lb (73 kg; 11 st 6 lb)
- Position: Centre
- Shot: Left
- Played for: Chicago Black Hawks; Detroit Red Wings; Boston Bruins
- Playing career: 1951–1973

Guyle Abner Fielder (November 21, 1930 – February 21, 2026) was an American-born Canadian professional ice hockey centre. He is most known for his time in the minor Western Hockey League, where he played from 1952 to 1973. Fielder also played 9 regular season and 6 playoff games in the National Hockey League between 1951 and 1958. He is the fourth-leading scorer in North American professional ice hockey history, behind Wayne Gretzky, Jaromír Jágr, and Gordie Howe, and holds the career records for minor-league ice hockey for the most games played, assists, and points scored. Fielder died from a stroke on February 21, 2026, at the age of 95.

== Playing career ==
Fielder moved to Nipawin, Saskatchewan, with his Canadian parents at an early age and played junior hockey in Prince Albert and Lethbridge before becoming professional. Fielder's National Hockey League (NHL) career consisted of 15 regular season and playoff games for the Chicago Black Hawks, Detroit Red Wings, and Boston Bruins. He played a total of 22 seasons in the Western Hockey League (WHL), mainly for the Seattle Totems, as well as for the New Westminster Royals, the Salt Lake Golden Eagles, and the Portland Buckaroos. He also played a single season for the St. Louis Flyers of the American Hockey League and had short stints with the Quebec Aces and the Edmonton Flyers.

Fielder won Rookie of the Year honors with New Westminster in 1952. He was a six-time WHL MVP, including four consecutive awards between 1957 and 1960, the league scoring leader nine times (including two stints of three straight), and a three-time honoree as the most gentlemanly player. He won Rookie of the Year honors after his one AHL season in 1953. He was drafted by the Houston Aeros of the WHA in 1972 but chose to remain out west, playing his final season for the Buckaroos in 1973 before retiring.

Among Fielder's scoring feats were four seasons of more than 100 points and 10 seasons of 70 assists or more. His 122 points in 1957 broke the professional record. He retired having scored 438 goals and 1,491 assists for 1,929 points. His points total set a professional record, exceeding Gordie Howe's output to that point, and is still the all-time minor league mark. His assists total is first all-time in the minor leagues and is double that of his nearest rival. Fielder played in 1,487 games, also the all-time minor league record.

The Seattle Kraken created the Guyle Fielder Award to recognize the player who best exemplifies Fielder's "perseverance, hustle and dedication" throughout the season. Yanni Gourde won the inaugural award on April 29, 2022.

== Career statistics ==
=== Regular season and playoffs ===
			Regular season					Playoffs
Season	Team	League	GP	G	A	Pts	PIM	GP	G	A	Pts	PIM
1947–48	Prince Albert Mintos	SJHL	25	26	15	41	20	2	0	1	1	0
1948–49	Prince Albert Mintos	SJHL	20	17	26	43	22	9	9	14	23	4
1948–49	Lethbridge Native Sons	WCJHL	2	1	1	2	0	—	—	—	—	—
1949–50	Lethbridge Native Sons	WCJHL	39	47	58	105	19	10	2	7	9	14
1950–51	Lethbridge Native Sons	WCJHL	37	44	56	100	6	7	3	5	8	8
1950–51	Chicago Black Hawks	NHL	3	0	0	0	0	—	—	—	—	—
1951–52	New Westminster Royals	PCHL	57	25	50	75	10	7	1	3	4	2
1952–53	St. Louis Flyers	AHL	62	22	61	83	12	—	—	—	—	—
1952–53	Edmonton Flyers	WHL	3	0	1	1	0	—	—	—	—	—
1952–53	Detroit Red Wings	NHL	—	—	—	—	—	4	0	0	0	0
1953–54	Seattle Bombers	WHL	68	24	64	88	20	—	—	—	—	—
1953–54	Boston Bruins	NHL	—	—	—	—	—	2	0	0	0	2
1954–55	New Westminster Royals	WHL	70	20	67	87	37	—	—	—	—	—
1955–56	Seattle Americans	WHL	70	18	61	79	42	—	—	—	—	—
1956–57	Seattle Americans	WHL	69	33	89	122	30	6	2	4	6	0
1957–58	Detroit Red Wings	NHL	6	0	0	0	2	—	—	—	—	—
1957–58	Seattle Americans	WHL	62	26	85	111	22	9	2	9	11	2
1958–59	Seattle Totems	WHL	69	24	95	119	18	12	4	9	13	4
1959–60	Seattle Totems	WHL	69	31	64	95	12	4	1	1	2	0
1960–61	Seattle Totems	WHL	69	24	71	95	32	11	2	9	11	4
1961–62	Seattle Totems	WHL	69	21	52	73	46	2	0	0	0	0
1962–63	Seattle Totems	WHL	69	17	80	97	20	17	5	17	22	6
1963–64	Seattle Totems	WHL	66	17	85	102	34	—	—	—	—	—
1963–64	Quebec Aces	AHL	—	—	—	—	—	1	0	0	0	0
1964–65	Seattle Totems	WHL	70	14	78	92	38	7	0	7	7	2
1965–66	Seattle Totems	WHL	70	19	75	94	10	—	—	—	—	—
1966–67	Seattle Totems	WHL	72	20	71	91	22	10	2	7	9	12
1967–68	Seattle Totems	WHL	70	15	55	70	26	9	6	5	11	2
1968–69	Seattle Totems	WHL	74	20	74	94	12	4	0	2	2	4
1969–70	Salt Lake Golden Eagles	WHL	55	8	58	66	20	—	—	—	—	—
1970–71	Salt Lake Golden Eagles	WHL	64	15	46	61	22	—	—	—	—	—
1971–72	Salt Lake Golden Eagles	WHL	30	5	22	27	4	—	—	—	—	—
1971–72	Portland Buckaroos	WHL	40	9	40	49	10	11	0	10	10	2
1972–73	Portland Buckaroos	WHL	70	11	47	58	4	—	—	—	—	—
WHL totals			1368	391	1380	1771	481	102	24	80	104	38
AHL totals			62	22	61	83	12	1	0	0	0	0
NHL totals			9	0	0	0	2	6	0	0	0	2

== Career achievements ==
- Ed Bruchet Trophy (awarded to the MVP of the WCJHL) – 1950
- WHL Rookie of the Year – 1952
- Dudley "Red" Garrett Memorial Award winner (awarded to the AHL Rookie of the Year) – 1953
- 9× WHL leading scorer – 1954, 1957–1960, 1963–1965, 1967
- 6× George Leader Cup winner (awarded to the WHL MVP) – 1957–1960, 1964, 1967
- 3× Fred J. Hume Cup winner (awarded to the most gentlemanly player in the WHL) – 1966, 1967, 1969
- AHL First All-Star Team – 1953
- WHL First All-Star Team – 1954, 1957, 1958, 1959, 1960, 1963, 1964, 1967
- WHL Second All-Star Team – 1961, 1965, 1966, 1968
