= Steve Hrymnak =

Canadian ice hockey player

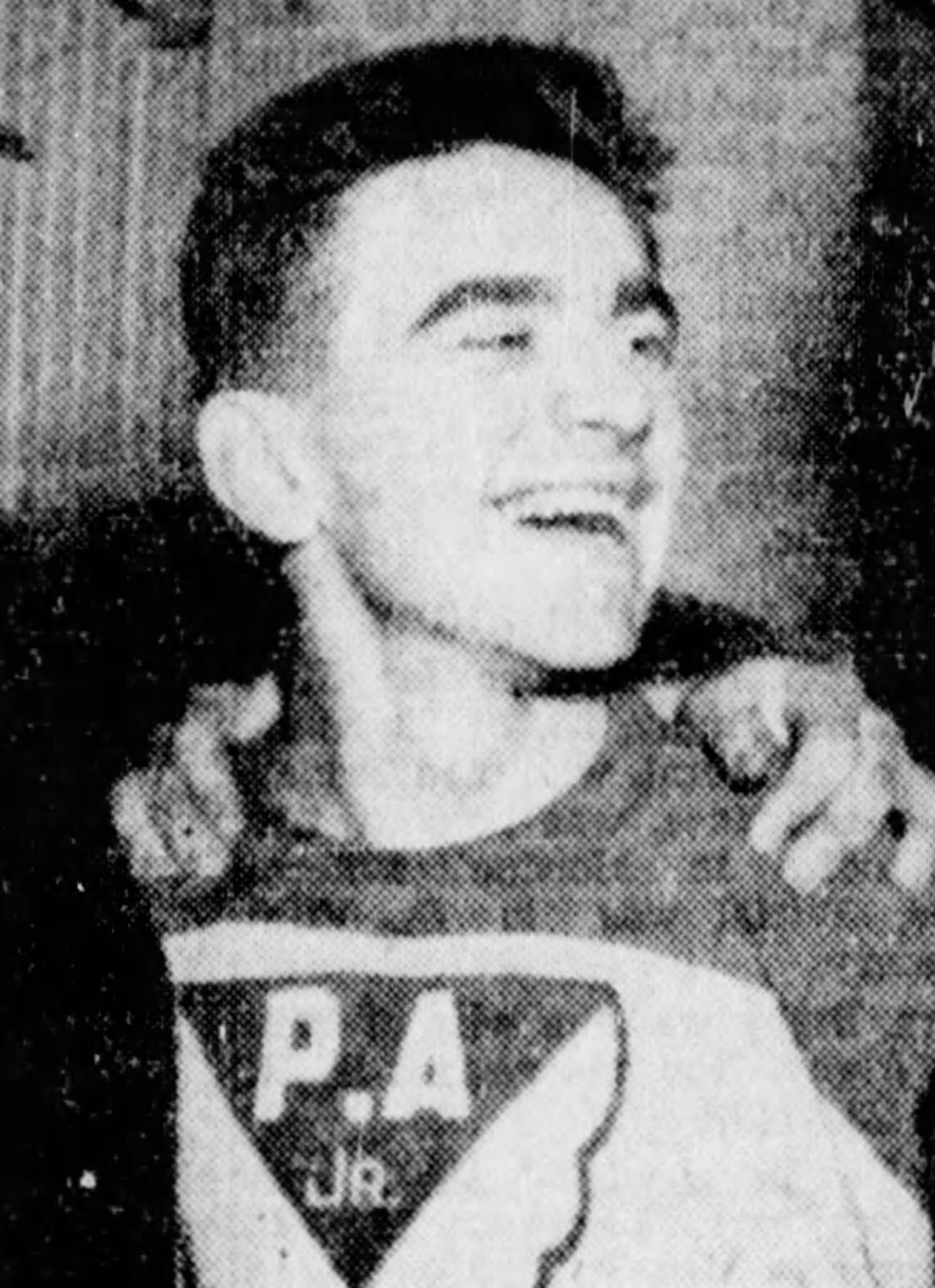
- Hrymnak pictured in a 1944 newspaper
- Born: March 3, 1926; Port Arthur, Ontario, Canada
- Died: November 23, 2015 (aged 89); Thunder Bay, Ontario, Canada
- Height: 5 ft 11 in (180 cm)
- Weight: 178 lb (81 kg; 12 st 10 lb)
- Position: Defence
- Shot: Left
- Played for: Chicago Black Hawks; Detroit Red Wings
- Playing career: 1946–1965

Stefan "Steve" Hrymnak (March 3, 1926 – November 23, 2015) was a Canadian professional ice hockey player who played 18 regular season games in the National Hockey League for the Chicago Black Hawks and 2 playoff games for the Detroit Red Wings between 1951 and 1953. The rest of his career, which lasted from 1946 to 1965, was spent in the minor leagues.

== Career statistics ==
=== Regular season and playoffs ===
			Regular season					Playoffs
Season	Team	League	GP	G	A	Pts	PIM	GP	G	A	Pts	PIM
1942–43	Port Arthur Flyers	TBJHL	9	8	3	11	8	5	0	0	0	10
1943–44	Port Arthur Flyers	TBJHL	10	0	5	5	19	6	3	4	7	4
1943–44	Port Arthur Flyers	M-Cup	—	—	—	—	—	8	0	1	1	12
1945–46	Port Arthur Flyers	TBJHL	4	5	4	9	4	10	6	7	13	14
1945–46	Port Arthur Flyers	M-Cup	—	—	—	—	—	5	2	1	3	6
1946–47	New York Rovers	EAHL	53	0	7	7	52	7	0	0	0	7
1947–48	New Haven Ramblers	AHL	39	10	4	14	23	4	0	1	1	4
1948–49	New Haven Ramblers	AHL	55	10	11	21	28	—	—	—	—	—
1949–50	New Haven Ramblers	AHL	70	13	17	30	28	—	—	—	—	—
1950–51	St. Louis Flyers	AHL	57	11	11	22	32	—	—	—	—	—
1951–52	St. Louis Flyers	AHL	48	14	36	50	19	—	—	—	—	—
1951–52	Chicago Black Hawks	NHL	18	2	1	3	4	—	—	—	—	—
1952–53	St. Louis Flyers	AHL	64	14	27	41	31	—	—	—	—	—
1952–53	Detroit Red Wings	NHL	—	—	—	—	—	2	0	0	0	0
1953–54	Edmonton Flyers	WHL	69	13	17	30	41	13	3	4	7	5
1954–55	Edmonton Flyers	WHL	69	8	22	30	26	9	2	0	2	20
1955–56	Edmonton Flyers	WHL	69	8	17	25	26	3	0	0	0	0
1956–57	New Westminster Royals	WHL	52	6	13	19	34	—	—	—	—	—
1957–58	New Westminster Royals	WHL	48	9	18	27	36	4	0	1	1	6
1959–60	Port Arthur Bearcats	TBSHL	—	—	—	—	—	—	—	—	—	—
1959–60	Port Arthur Bearcats	Al-Cup	—	—	—	—	—	7	0	3	3	6
1960–61	Port Arthur Bearcats	TBSHL	—	—	—	—	—	—	—	—	—	—
1960–61	Port Arthur Bearcats	Al-Cup	—	—	—	—	—	4	1	2	3	4
1961–62	Port Arthur Bearcats	TBSHL	—	—	—	—	—	—	—	—	—	—
1962–63	Port Arthur Bearcats	TBSHL	—	—	—	—	—	—	—	—	—	—
1963–64	Port Arthur Bearcats	TBSHL	—	—	—	—	—	—	—	—	—	—
1964–65	Port Arthur Bearcats	TBSHL	10	0	1	1	22	—	—	—	—	—
AHL totals			333	72	106	178	161	4	0	1	1	4
WHL totals			307	44	87	131	163	29	5	5	10	31
NHL totals			18	2	1	3	4	2	0	0	0	0
