= Ray Hannigan =

Canadian ice hockey player (1927–2020)

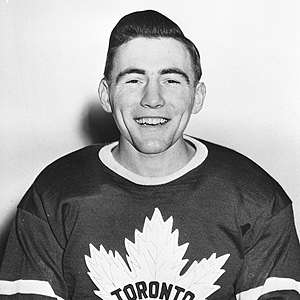
- Born: July 14, 1927 Schumacher, Ontario, Canada
- Died: July 18, 2020 (aged 93) Mesa, Arizona, United States
- Height: 5 ft 8 in (173 cm)
- Weight: 155 lb (70 kg; 11 st 1 lb)
- Position: Right wing
- Shot: Left
- Played for: Toronto Maple Leafs
- Playing career: 1947–1955

Raymond James Hannigan (July 14, 1927 — July 18, 2020) was a Canadian professional ice hockey right winger. He played 3 games for the Toronto Maple Leafs of the National Hockey League during the 1948–49 season. The rest of his career lasted from 1947 to 1955 and was spent in the minor leagues. His brothers, Pat and Gord, also played professional hockey.

Hannigan was ordained 1991 as a Catholic priest and later lived in the United States. He died in Mesa, Arizona on July 18, 2020.

== Career statistics ==
=== Regular season and playoffs ===
			Regular season					Playoffs
Season	Team	League	GP	G	A	Pts	PIM	GP	G	A	Pts	PIM
1944–45	South Porcupine Porkies	NOJHA	—	15	3	18	2	—	—	—	—	—
1944–45	South Porcupine Porkies	M-Cup	—	—	—	—	—	2	2	2	4	0
1945–46	St. Michael's Buzzers	OHA-B	8	23	12	35	29	2	3	1	4	0
1945–46	St. Michael's Majors	OHA	2	1	0	1	0	—	—	—	—	—
1946–47	St. Michael's Majors	OHA	22	13	8	21	21	9	11	2	13	6
1946–47	St. Michael's Majors	M-Cup	—	—	—	—	—	10	3	11	14	23
1947–48	Toronto Marlboros	OHA Sr	35	27	21	48	26	5	2	0	2	10
1948–49	Toronto Maple Leafs	NHL	3	0	0	0	2	—	—	—	—	—
1948–49	Toronto Marlboros	OHA Sr	38	24	21	45	24	9	7	5	12	18
1948–49	Toronto Marlboros	Al-Cup	—	—	—	—	—	13	9	6	15	8
1949–50	Pittsburgh Hornets	AHL	64	30	21	51	14	—	—	—	—	—
1949–50	Toronto Marlboros	Al-Cup	—	—	—	—	—	12	2	7	9	25
1950–51	Pittsburgh Hornets	AHL	65	24	17	41	31	13	9	6	15	20
1951–52	Pittsburgh Hornets	AHL	49	17	18	35	56	10	4	1	5	11
1952–53	Edmonton Flyers	WHL	64	22	19	41	53	15	7	6	13	6
1953–54	Edmonton Flyers	WHL	66	30	31	61	29	13	3	7	10	11
1954–55	Edmonton Flyers	WHL	56	21	16	37	27	—	—	—	—	—
AHL totals			178	71	56	127	101	23	13	7	20	31
WHL totals			186	73	66	139	109	28	10	13	23	17
NHL totals			3	0	0	0	2	—	—	—	—	—
