= 6th National Hockey League All-Star Game =

Professional ice hockey exhibition game

6th NHL All-Star Game
	1	2	3	Total
first All-Star team	0	1	0	1
second All-Star team	0	0	1	1
- Date: October 5, 1952
- Arena: Detroit Olympia
- City: Detroit
- Attendance: 10,680

The 6th National Hockey League All-Star Game took place at the Detroit Olympia, home of the Detroit Red Wings, on October 5, 1952. For the second year in a row, the format had the first and second All-Star teams, with additional players on each team, play each other. After the game ended in a tie for the second year in a row, the NHL decided that they would continue with the previous format of the Stanley Cup winner playing an all-star team.

== The game ==
=== Game summary ===
	first All-Star team	second All-Star team
Final score	1	1
Scoring summary	Pavelich (Mosienko, Creighton), 9:57 2nd	Richard (Buller), 1:36 3rd
Penalties	Sandford, 3:51 2nd; Howe, 6:34 3rd; Lach, 15:09 3rd	Buller, 0:23 1st; Thomson, 12:46 1st; Richard, 18:03 1st; Bouchard, 4:53 2nd; Thomson, 7:50 2nd; Thomson, 16:39 2nd
Win/loss	T - Terry Sawchuk	T - Jim Henry/Gerry McNeil

- Referee: Bill Chadwick
- Linesmen: George Young, Doug Young

== Rosters ==
	first All-Star team	second All-Star team
Head coach	Tommy Ivan (Detroit Red Wings)	Dick Irvin (Montreal Canadiens)
Lineup	Starting lineup: 1 - G Terry Sawchuk (Detroit Red Wings)^{1}; 1 - G Charlie Rayner (New York Rangers)^{1} ^{3}; 2 - D Doug Harvey (Montreal Canadiens)^{1}; 3 - D Gus Mortson (Toronto Maple Leafs); 4 - D Red Kelly (Detroit Red Wings)^{1}; 5 - C Dave Creighton (Boston Bruins); 6 - LW Ed Sandford (Boston Bruins); 7 - LW Ted Lindsay (Detroit Red Wings)^{1}; 8 - D Leo Reise Jr. (New York Rangers); 9 - RW Gordie Howe (Detroit Red Wings)^{1}; 10 - LW Marty Pavelich (Detroit Red Wings); 11 - D Bill Quackenbush (Boston Bruins); 12 - RW Bill Mosienko (Chicago Black Hawks); 14 - D Bob Goldham (Detroit Red Wings); 15 - LW Tony Leswick (Detroit Red Wings); 16 - C Elmer Lach (Montreal Canadiens)^{1}; 21 - RW Reg Sinclair (Detroit Red Wings)	Starting lineup: 1 - G Jim Henry (Boston Bruins)^{2}; 1 - G Gerry McNeil (Montreal Canadiens); 2 - D Jim Thomson (Toronto Maple Leafs)^{2}; 3 - D Hy Buller (New York Rangers)^{2}; 4 - LW Harry Watson (Toronto Maple Leafs); 5 - RW Bernie Geoffrion (Montreal Canadiens); 6 - RW Floyd Curry (Montreal Canadiens); 9 - RW Maurice Richard (Montreal Canadiens)^{2}; 10 - D Tom Johnson (Montreal Canadiens); 11 - D Butch Bouchard (Montreal Canadiens); 12 - D Fern Flaman (Toronto Maple Leafs); 14 - C Ken Mosdell (Montreal Canadiens); 15 - C Milt Schmidt (Boston Bruins)^{2}; 16 - C Tod Sloan (Toronto Maple Leafs); 17 - C Billy Reay (Montreal Canadiens); 20 - LW Paul Meger (Montreal Canadiens); 24 - LW Sid Smith (Toronto Maple Leafs)^{2}

Notes

- ^1 Named to the first All-Star team in 1951–52.
- ^2 Named to the second All-Star team in 1951–52.
- ^3 Selected to play but injured prior to game.
