= 1950–51 NHL transactions =

The following is a list of all team-to-team transactions that have occurred in the National Hockey League (NHL) during the 1950–51 NHL season. It lists which team each player has been traded to and for which player(s) or other consideration(s), if applicable.

== Transactions ==
| July 13, 1950 | To Detroit Red Wings Bob Goldham; Sugar Jim Henry; Metro Prystai; Gaye Stewart | To Chicago Black Hawks Pete Babando; Al Dewsbury; Harry Lumley; Don Morrison; Jack Stewart |
| September 19, 1950 | To Chicago Black Hawks Steve Hrymnak | To New York Rangers cash |
| September 19, 1950 | To Chicago Black Hawks Jean Lamirande | To New York Rangers cash |
| October, 1950 exact date unknown | To Detroit Red Wings cash | To Chicago Black Hawks Pat Lundy |
| October 4, 1950 | To Montreal Canadiens Ralph Nattrass | To Chicago Black Hawks cash |
| November 16, 1950 | To Boston Bruins Dunc Fisher future considerations (loan of Alex Kaleta to Hershey Bears - AHL)^{1} | To New York Rangers Ed Harrison; Zellio Toppazzini |
| November 16, 1950 | To Toronto Maple Leafs Leo Boivin; Fern Flaman; Phil Maloney; Kenny Smith | To Boston Bruins Bill Ezinicki; Vic Lynn |
| December 2, 1950 | To Detroit Red Wings Bert Olmstead; Vic Stasiuk | To Chicago Black Hawks Steve Black; Lee Fogolin Sr. |
| December 5, 1950 | To Boston Bruins loan of Max Quackenbush for remainder of 1950-51 season | To Detroit Red Wings Stephen Kraftcheck |
| December 19, 1950 | To Montreal Canadiens Bert Olmstead | To Detroit Red Wings Leo Gravelle |
| February 14, 1951 | To Boston Bruins Hal Laycoe | To Montreal Canadiens Ross Lowe |

Notes

1. Trade completed on November 20, 1950.
