= Reg Sinclair =

Canadian ice hockey player

- Born: March 6, 1925 Lachine, Quebec, Canada
- Died: November 14, 2013 (aged 88) Quispamsis, New Brunswick, Canada
- Height: 6 ft 0 in (183 cm)
- Weight: 165 lb (75 kg; 11 st 11 lb)
- Position: Right wing/Centre
- Shot: Right
- Played for: New York Rangers; Detroit Red Wings
- Playing career: 1950–1953

Reginald Alexander Sinclair (March 6, 1925 – November 14, 2013) was a Canadian professional ice hockey forward. He played in the National Hockey League (NHL) for the New York Rangers and Detroit Red Wings and was twice named to play in an NHL All-Star Game. Sinclair quit hockey in 1953 after only three NHL seasons to focus on a business career. He served as a vice-president of Pepsi and as president and partner of Maritime Beverages.

== Early life ==
Sinclair was born in Lachine, Quebec. He was the youngest of Elizabeth and James Sinclair's four children and grew up in Montreal. Sinclair served with the Royal Canadian Air Force during the Second World War between 1943 and 1945. He then enrolled at McGill University where he earned a degree in commerce in 1949.

== Playing career ==
While attending McGill, Sinclair played collegiate hockey where he was a star right wing and centre over five seasons. He scored 53 goals in 52 games over that time and twice led the Redmen in scoring. In a February 25, 1949, game against the University of Montreal Carabins, Sinclair scored ten points (three goals, seven assists), tying a school record for points in one game that he continues to share. Serving as captain of the Redmen in 1948–49, he was named the most valuable player of the Senior Intercollegiate Hockey League after leading the circuit in scoring with 35 points in 12 games.

Sinclair joined the Sherbrooke Saints of the Quebec Senior Hockey League (QSHL) for the 1949–50 season. After scoring 46 points in 56 regular season games, he then led the QSHL in playoff scoring with 30 points in 22 post-season games. The Saints reached the Eastern Canada Final for the 1950 Allan Cup, but lost the series to Ontario champions Toronto Marlboros. The National Hockey League (NHL)'s New York Rangers became interested in Sinclair as a result of his performance with Sherbrooke and signed him to a contract. Sinclair negotiated hard with New York general manager Frank Boucher and emerged with a two-year contract worth $25,000 in addition to a $10,000 signing bonus that made him the highest paid player on the Rangers.

Sinclair made the Rangers roster out of training camp; he was the only first-year player to do so for New York. His 39 points led all NHL rookies in 1950–51 and tied for the team lead. He played in the 1951 All-Star Game, and lost the vote for the Calder Trophy as rookie of the year to Terry Sawchuk. Sinclair was again an all-star in 1951–52 amidst a 20-goal season. He nearly retired following the season to pursue a business career, but the Detroit Red Wings, in need of a scoring forward to replace the retired Sid Abel, made a significant contractual offer for his services. Detroit acquired Sinclair from the Rangers in a trade on August 18, 1952. The Red Wings, who also acquired John Morrison and cash, sent defenceman Leo Reise, Jr. to New York. Sinclair scored 23 points for Detroit in 1952–53 and played in his first three NHL playoff games, scoring one goal. Following the season, he shocked the Red Wings organization by quitting hockey.

== Personal life ==
Having worked for Pepsi during the hockey off-seasons, Sinclair opted to join the company full-time. He began his business career making $275 per month, less than one-quarter the salary he would have received in the NHL. He rose within the company and in 1965 had been promoted to vice president, Pepsi International. He later moved to Columbus, Georgia to work for Royal Crown Cola before returning to Canada where he became president and a partner in Maritime Beverages in Saint John, New Brunswick.

Sinclair met his wife Ronnie while training in Calgary during his tenure with the Air Force. The couple had three children: Jim, Colleen and Linda. Sinclair was a founding member of the Montreal Canadiens oldtimers, a team which helped raise money for Montreal's children's hospital. He was invited despite having never played with the Canadiens, the only such player to join the team at the time of its founding. He was President of the Saint John Board of Trade and was a member of the board of the Halifax Children's Hospital. Sinclair died on November 14, 2013, at Quispamsis, New Brunswick.

== Career statistics ==
			Regular season					Playoffs
Season	Team	League	GP	G	A	Pts	PIM	GP	G	A	Pts	PIM
1944–45	McGill Redmen	MCHL	12	12	5	17	14	—	—	—	—	—
1945–46	McGill Redmen	MCHL	9	9	3	12	10	3	3	2	5	4
1946–47	McGill Redmen	MCHL	6	0	1	1	0	—	—	—	—	—
1947–48	McGill Redmen	MCHL	12	11	6	17	28	—	—	—	—	—
1948–49	McGill Redmen	MCHL	12	21	14	35	17	—	—	—	—	—
1949–50	Sherbrooke Saints	QSHL	56	15	31	46	94	12	7	9	16	24
1949–50	Sherbooke Saints	Allan Cup	—	—	—	—	—	10	8	6	14	10
1950–51	New York Rangers	NHL	70	18	21	39	70	—	—	—	—	—
1951–52	New York Rangers	NHL	69	20	10	30	33	—	—	—	—	—
1952–53	Detroit Red Wings	NHL	69	11	12	23	36	3	1	0	1	0
NHL totals			208	49	43	92	139	3	1	0	1	0
