= 1952–53 NHL season =

National Hockey League season

- League: National Hockey League
- Sport: Ice hockey
- Duration: October 9, 1952 – April 16, 1953
- Games: 70
- Teams: 6
- TV partner(s): CBC, SRC (Canada); None (United States)

Regular season
- Season champion: Detroit Red Wings
- Season MVP: Gordie Howe (Red Wings)
- Top scorer: Gordie Howe (Red Wings)

Stanley Cup
- Champions: Montreal Canadiens
- Runners-up: Boston Bruins

NHL seasons
- ← 1951–52 1953–54 →

The 1952–53 NHL season was the 36th season of the National Hockey League. Six teams played 70 games each. The Montreal Canadiens were the Stanley Cup winners as they beat the Boston Bruins four games to one in the final series.

== League business ==
The NHL almost had a seventh franchise, as the Cleveland Barons of the American Hockey League applied for a franchise. They were accepted with the proviso that they deposit $425,000 to show good faith, and prove they had sufficient working capital to consort with the other NHL teams. They could not come up with the working capital and transfer of applicants stock to Cleveland residents. As a result, the Barons were told to apply at a later date.

A big deal was made between Toronto and Chicago as the Maple Leafs shipped Al Rollins, Gus Mortson, and Cal Gardner for goaltender Harry Lumley.

Sid Abel was signed by Chicago to be player-coach.

What was rumoured became fact in September when Arthur M. Wirtz and James D. Norris became the new owners of the near bankrupt Chicago Black Hawks.

James E. Norris, owner of the Detroit Red Wings since 1932 and father of James D. Norris, Chicago owner, died of a heart attack on December 4, 1952, and his daughter Marguerite became the owner. She became the first female owner of an NHL franchise since Ida Querrie owned the Toronto St. Patricks in 1923 when her husband Charlie transferred his stock in the team to her to avoid paying Eddie Livingstone any money in Livingstone's lawsuit against him.

NHL on-ice officials changed to orange-coloured uniforms in March 1953. The officials had worn cream-coloured uniforms which were not distinguishable from some team's home-ice uniforms.

== Regular season ==
For the fifth straight season, the Detroit Red Wings lead the league in points. Gordie Howe won the Hart Trophy over Al Rollins, but on the strength of Rollins' goaltending, Chicago made the playoffs for the first time since 1946.

The first television broadcast in Canada of an NHL game occurred on October 11, 1952. It was a French language broadcast of a game between the Montreal Canadiens and Detroit Red Wings with the Canadiens winning 2–1. The French language telecast was produced by 24-year-old Gerald Renaud. On November 1, the first English language broadcast aired, with Foster Hewitt calling the action, starting in the second period because Conn Smythe was concerned that it would cut into the crowds at the arena.

=== Highlights ===
Gump Worsley made his NHL debut October 9, 1952, in goal for the New York Rangers at the Detroit Olympia and lost 5–3, as Ted Lindsay scored in a tip-in on the power play for Worsley's first goal against him. The Production line scored 3 goals that night as Alex Delvecchio and Gordie Howe also had goals. Marty Pavelich scored what proved to be the winning goal.

On November 8, 14,562 fans were in attendance at the Montreal Forum when the Canadiens beat Chicago 6–4. Elmer Lach scored his 200th career goal. Fifty seconds later, after Emile "Butch" Bouchard fed him the puck, Rocket Richard rifled a puck past Al Rollins for his 325th goal, breaking Nels Stewart's record for career goals. It was ten years to the day since Richard had scored his first NHL goal. "Old Poison" sent the following telegram: "Congratulations on breaking record. Hope you will hold it for many seasons. Best of luck to you and rest of team."

When Terry Sawchuk was injured in practice, the Red Wings brought up Glenn Hall and he made his NHL debut on December 27 and played well in a 2–2 tie with Montreal. Hall then picked up his first career shutout January 7, blanking Boston 4–0.

Red Wings General manager Jack Adams got into some trouble on January 18 when, after a 3–2 loss to Montreal, he entered the officials room and argued with referee Red Storey. Dick Irvin, coach of Montreal, was very upset over this and NHL president Clarence Campbell agreed, fining Adams $500.

Gump Worsley got his first career shutout January 11 when the New York Rangers defeated the Canadiens 7–0 in Montreal.

Butch Bouchard Night was held on February 28 and he was presented with a car and a TV set. Detroit spoiled the night with a 4–3 victory.

Ted Lindsay scored 4 goals on March 2 as Detroit pummeled Boston by a score of 10–2.

Gordie Howe scored 49 goals to nearly tie Rocket Richard's record. Howe was held off the scoresheet in the final game of the season by Richard's Canadiens. Howe set a new points record for the season with 95 points and won the Art Ross and Hart trophies.

=== Final standings ===
National Hockey League
		GP	W	L	T	GF	GA	DIFF	Pts
1	Detroit Red Wings	70	36	16	18	222	133	+89	90
2	Montreal Canadiens	70	28	23	19	155	148	+7	75
3	Boston Bruins	70	28	29	13	152	172	−20	69
4	Chicago Black Hawks	70	27	28	15	169	175	−6	69
5	Toronto Maple Leafs	70	27	30	13	156	167	−11	67
6	New York Rangers	70	17	37	16	152	211	−59	50

== Playoffs ==
In a major upset, first-place Detroit was defeated in the semifinal by the Boston Bruins in six games. In the other semifinal, the fourth-place Chicago Black Hawks, making their first playoff appearance in seven years, took a 3–2 series lead after losing the first two games to the second-place Montreal Canadiens, but could not finish the job, losing in seven games.

=== Playoff bracket ===
The top four teams in the league qualified for the playoffs. In the semifinals, the first-place team played the third-place team, while the second-place team faced the fourth-place team, with the winners advancing to the Stanley Cup Finals. In both rounds, teams competed in a best-of-seven series (scores in the bracket indicate the number of games won in each best-of-seven series).

Semifinals
1	Detroit	2
3	Boston	4
2	Montreal	4
4	Chicago	3

Stanley Cup Finals
3	Boston	1
2	Montreal	4

=== Semifinals ===
==== (1) Detroit Red Wings vs. (3) Boston Bruins ====
March 24	Boston Bruins	0–7	Detroit Red Wings	Olympia Stadium	Recap
No scoring		First period	02:39 – Marty Pavelich (1); 08:45 – Ted Lindsay (1); 09:16 – Marty Pavelich (2)
No scoring		Second period	08:52 – Alex Delvecchio (1)
No scoring		Third period	05:54 – Metro Prystai (1); 06:53 – Johnny Wilson (1); 16:04 – Ted Lindsay (2)
Jim Henry		Goalie stats	Terry Sawchuck

March 26	Boston Bruins	5–3	Detroit Red Wings	Olympia Stadium	Recap
Fleming MacKell (1) – 07:56; Dave Creighton (1) – 14:09		First period	08:54 – pp – Gordie Howe (1)
Joe Klukay (1) – 02:10		Second period	No scoring
Johnny Peirson (1) – 10:04; Dave Creighton (2) – 12:58		Third period	17:38 – Metro Prystai (2); 18:08 – Metro Prystai (3)
Jim Henry		Goalie stats	Terry Sawchuck

March 29	Detroit Red Wings	1–2	OT	Boston Bruins	Boston Garden	Recap
No scoring		First period		11:27 – Ed Sandford (1)
Tony Leswick (1) – 10:54		Second period		No scoring
No scoring		Third period		No scoring
No scoring		First overtime period		12:29 – Jack McIntyre (1)
Terry Sawchuck		Goalie stats		Jim Henry

March 31	Detroit Red Wings	2–6	Boston Bruins	Boston Garden	Recap
No scoring		First period	02:45 – Ed Sandford (2); 13:12 – Jack McIntyre (2)
Metro Prystai (4) – 14:27; Alex Delvecchio (2) – 15:48		Second period	06:05 – pp – Milt Schmidt (1); 10:37 – Jack McIntyre (3); 11:22 – Dave Creighton (3)
No scoring		Third period	12:55 – Ed Sandford (3)
Terry Sawchuck		Goalie stats	Jim Henry

April 2	Boston Bruins	4–6	Detroit Red Wings	Olympia Stadium	Recap
No scoring		First period	00:23 – Ted Lindsay (3); 00:55 – Bob Goldham (1); 03:45 – Benny Woit (1)
Ed Sandford (4) – 09:02		Second period	08:42 – Gordie Howe (2); 11:32 – Johnny Wilson (2)
Ed Sandford (5) – 01:54; Milt Schmidt (2) – 11:57; Milt Schmidt (3) – pp – 16:46		Third period	09:54 – Glen Skov (1)
Jim Henry		Goalie stats	Terry Sawchuck

April 5	Detroit Red Wings	2–4	Boston Bruins	Boston Garden	Recap
No scoring		First period	03:41 – pp – Ed Sandford (6)
Reg Sinclair (1) – 18:05		Second period	11:36 – Johnny Peirson (2)
Ted Lindsay (4) – 13:27		Third period	11:19 – Fleming MacKell (2); 17:36 – Leo Labine (1)
Terry Sawchuck		Goalie stats	Jim Henry

Boston won series 4–2

==== (2) Montreal Canadiens vs. (4) Chicago Black Hawks ====
March 24	Chicago Black Hawks	1–3	Montreal Canadiens	Montreal Forum	Recap
No scoring		First period	No scoring
Gerry Couture (1) – 13:34		Second period	14:55 – Bernie Geoffrion (1)
No scoring		Third period	04:29 – Butch Bouchard (1); 17:54 – Paul Meger (1)
Al Rollins		Goalie stats	Gerry McNeil

March 26	Chicago Black Hawks	3–4	Montreal Canadiens	Montreal Forum	Recap
Jim McFadden (1) – 02:35; George Gee (1) – 05:29; Jim McFadden (2) – 06:58		First period	05:17 – Floyd Curry (1)
No scoring		Second period	12:32 – Dickie Moore (1); 18:08 – Bernie Geoffrion (2); 19:02 – Dick Gamble (1)
No scoring		Third period	No scoring
Al Rollins		Goalie stats	Gerry McNeil

March 29	Montreal Canadiens	1–2	OT	Chicago Black Hawks	Chicago Stadium	Recap
No scoring		First period		No scoring
Bernie Geoffrion (3) – 14:53		Second period		No scoring
No scoring		Third period		18:03 – Bill Mosienko (1)
No scoring		First overtime period		05:18 – Al Dewsbury (1)
Gerry McNeil		Goalie stats		Al Rollins

March 31	Montreal Canadiens	1–3	Chicago Black Hawks	Chicago Stadium	Recap
Bert Olmstead (1) – pp – 11:12		First period	No scoring
No scoring		Second period	02:57 – Bill Mosienko (2)
No scoring		Third period	12:28 – Vic Lynn (1); 19:56 – Jim McFadden (3)
Gerry McNeil		Goalie stats	Al Rollins

April 2	Chicago Black Hawks	4–2	Montreal Canadiens	Montreal Forum	Recap
Fred Hucul (1) – pp – 04:00; Bill Mosienko (3) – 06:59; Gus Bodnar (1) – 11:26		First period	No scoring
Gus Mortson (1) – 18:48		Second period	04:53 – Maurice Richard (1)
No scoring		Third period	14:36 – Tom Johnson (1)
Al Rollins		Goalie stats	Gerry McNeil

April 4	Montreal Canadiens	3–0	Chicago Black Hawks	Chicago Stadium	Recap
Bernie Geoffrion (4) – 05:59		First period	No scoring
Maurice Richard (2) – 03:23; Ken Mosdell (1) – 16:20		Second period	No scoring
No scoring		Third period	No scoring
Jacques Plante		Goalie stats	Al Rollins

April 7	Chicago Black Hawks	1–4	Montreal Canadiens	Montreal Forum	Recap
No scoring		First period	01:38 – pp – Bernie Geoffrion (5)
Bill Mosienko (4) – 14:16		Second period	15:36 – Eddie Mazur (1)
No scoring		Third period	04:51 – pp – Maurice Richard (3); 13:55 – Eddie Mazur (2)
Al Rollins		Goalie stats	Jacques Plante

Montreal won series 4–3

=== Stanley Cup Finals ===
In the finals, the Bruins could not continue their winning ways, and lost to Montreal in five games.

After the finals, the Cleveland Barons of the American Hockey League applied to play a Stanley Cup challenge. The NHL governors turned down the challenge, stating that the Cleveland club operated in a league of lower standing.

April 9	Boston Bruins	2–4	Montreal Canadiens	Montreal Forum	Recap
Bob Armstrong (1) – pp – 02:08		First period	13:42 – Dickie Moore (2)
No scoring		Second period	02:37 – Ken Mosdell (2); 16:05 – Floyd Curry (2)
Johnny Peirson (3) – pp – 10:11		Third period	11:12 – Maurice Richard (4)
Jim Henry, Gord Henry		Goalie stats	Jacques Plante

April 11	Boston Bruins	4–1	Montreal Canadiens	Montreal Forum	Recap
Leo Labine (2) – 03:53; Ed Sandford (7) – 18:13		First period	No scoring
Ed Sandford (8) – 07:26		Second period	01:36 – Bert Olmstead (2)
Milt Schmidt (4) – 15:43		Third period	No scoring
Gord Henry; Jim Henry		Goalie stats	Jacques Plante

April 12	Montreal Canadiens	3–0	Boston Bruins	Boston Garden	Recap
Tom Johnson (2) – 11:53		First period	No scoring
Paul Masnick (1) – 06:30		Second period	No scoring
Ken Mosdell (3) – pp – 11:27		Third period	No scoring
Gerry McNeil		Goalie stats	Gord Henry

April 14	Montreal Canadiens	7–3	Boston Bruins	Boston Garden	Recap
Lorne Davis (1) – 03:23; Maurice Richard (5) – 10:58; Dickie Moore (3) – 16:40		First period	18:22 – Dave Creighton (4)
Bernie Geoffrion (6) – pp – 18:56		Second period	No scoring
Maurice Richard (6) – 05:33; Calum MacKay (1) – 17:59; Maurice Richard (7) – 18:27		Third period	07:23 – Milt Schmidt (5); 16:25 – Jack McIntyre (4)
Gerry McNeil		Goalie stats	Gord Henry

April 16	Boston Bruins	0–1	OT	Montreal Canadiens	Montreal Forum	Recap
No scoring		First period		No scoring
No scoring		Second period		No scoring
No scoring		Third period		No scoring
No scoring		First overtime period		01:22 – Elmer Lach (1)
Jim Henry		Goalie stats		Gerry McNeil

Montreal won series 4–1

== Awards ==
Prince of Wales Trophy: (Best regular-season record)	Detroit Red Wings
Art Ross Trophy: (Top scorer)	Gordie Howe, Detroit Red Wings
Calder Memorial Trophy: (Top first-year player)	Lorne "Gump" Worsley, New York Rangers
Hart Trophy: (Most valuable player)	Gordie Howe, Detroit Red Wings
Lady Byng Memorial Trophy: (Excellence and sportsmanship)	Red Kelly, Detroit Red Wings
Vezina Trophy: (Goaltender of team with best goals-against record)	Terry Sawchuk, Detroit Red Wings

=== All-Star teams ===
First team	Position	Second team
Terry Sawchuk, Detroit Red Wings	G	Gerry McNeil, Montreal Canadiens
Red Kelly, Detroit Red Wings	D	Bill Quackenbush, Boston Bruins
Doug Harvey, Montreal Canadiens	D	Bill Gadsby, Chicago Black Hawks
Fleming MacKell, Boston Bruins	C	Alex Delvecchio, Detroit Red Wings
Gordie Howe, Detroit Red Wings	RW	Maurice Richard, Montreal Canadiens
Ted Lindsay, Detroit Red Wings	LW	Bert Olmstead, Montreal Canadiens

== Player statistics ==
=== Scoring leaders ===
Note: GP = Games played, G = Goals, A = Assists, PTS = Points, PIM = Penalties in minutes

Player	Team	GP	G	A	PTS	PIM
Gordie Howe	Detroit Red Wings	70	49	46	95	57
Ted Lindsay	Detroit Red Wings	70	32	39	71	111
Maurice Richard	Montreal Canadiens	70	28	33	61	112
Wally Hergesheimer	New York Rangers	70	30	29	59	10
Alex Delvecchio	Detroit Red Wings	70	16	43	59	28
Paul Ronty	New York Rangers	70	16	38	54	20
Metro Prystai	Detroit Red Wings	70	16	34	50	12
Red Kelly	Detroit Red Wings	70	19	27	46	8
Bert Olmstead	Montreal Canadiens	69	17	28	45	83
Fleming Mackell	Boston Bruins	65	27	17	44	63

=== Leading goaltenders ===
Note: GP = Games played; Min – Minutes played; GA = Goals against; GAA = Goals against average; W = Wins; L = Losses; T = Ties; SO = Shutouts

Player	Team	GP	MIN	GA	GAA	W	L	T	SO
Terry Sawchuk	Detroit Red Wings	63	3780	120	1.90	32	15	16	9
Gerry McNeil	Montreal Canadiens	66	3960	140	2.12	25	23	18	10
Harry Lumley	Toronto Maple Leafs	70	4200	167	2.39	27	30	13	10
Jim Henry	Boston Bruins	70	4200	142	2.46	28	29	13	7
Al Rollins	Chicago Black Hawks	70	4200	175	2.50	27	28	15	6
Chuck Rayner	New York Rangers	20	1200	58	2.90	4	8	8	1
Lorne Worsley	New York Rangers	50	3000	153	3.06	13	29	8	2

== Coaches ==
- Boston Bruins: Lynn Patrick
- Chicago Black Hawks: Sid Abel
- Detroit Red Wings: Tommy Ivan
- Montreal Canadiens: Dick Irvin
- New York Rangers: Bill Cook
- Toronto Maple Leafs: Joe Primeau

== Debuts ==
The following is a list of players of note who played their first NHL game in 1952–53 (listed with their first team, asterisk(*) marks debut in playoffs):

- Jerry Toppazzini, Boston Bruins
- Glenn Hall, Detroit Red Wings
- Marcel Bonin, Detroit Red Wings
- Ed Litzenberger, Montreal Canadiens
- Jacques Plante, Montreal Canadiens
- Harry Howell, New York Rangers
- Dean Prentice, New York Rangers
- Gump Worsley, New York Rangers
- Andy Bathgate, New York Rangers
- Ron Murphy, New York Rangers
- Ron Stewart, Toronto Maple Leafs

== Last games ==
The following is a list of players of note that played their last game in the NHL in 1952–53 (listed with their last team):

- Pentti Lund, Boston Bruins
- Chuck Rayner, New York Rangers
- Pete Babando, New York Rangers

== Broadcasting ==
The television version of Hockey Night in Canada made its debut on CBC Television. Regular season games were not broadcast in their entirety until the 1968–69 season, and were typically joined in progress at 9 p.m. Eastern Time, while the radio version of HNIC aired games in their entirety. Television coverage this season did not extend to the Stanley Cup playoffs.

== See also ==
- 1952–53 NHL transactions
- List of Stanley Cup champions
- 6th National Hockey League All-Star Game
- National Hockey League All-Star Game
- 1952 in sports
- 1953 in sports
