= Ed Sandford =

Canadian ice hockey player (1928–2023)

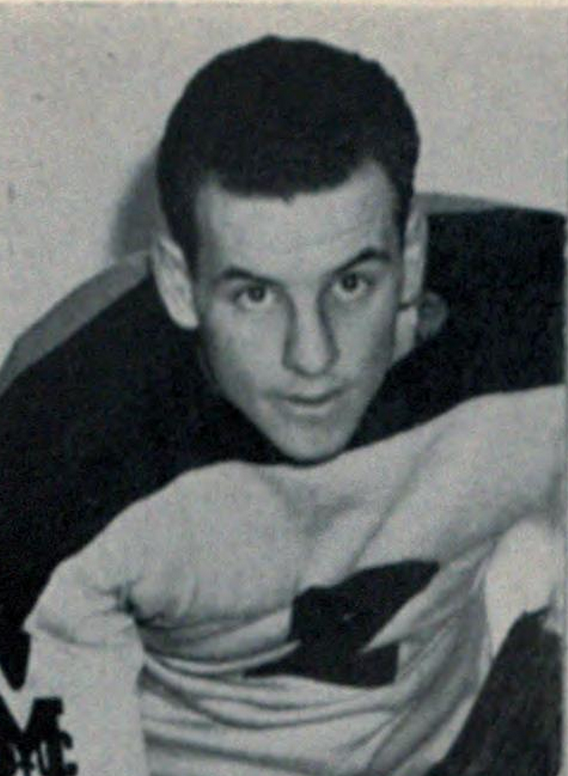
- Sandford, c. 1947
- Born: August 20, 1928 New Toronto, Ontario, Canada
- Died: October 25, 2023 (aged 95) Winchester, Massachusetts, U.S.
- Height: 6 ft 1 in (185 cm)
- Weight: 180 lb (82 kg; 12 st 12 lb)
- Position: Left wing
- Shot: Right
- Played for: Boston Bruins; Chicago Black Hawks; Detroit Red Wings
- Playing career: 1946–1956

Edward Michael Sandford (August 20, 1928 – October 25, 2023) was a Canadian professional ice hockey forward. He played most of his professional career for the Boston Bruins of the National Hockey League.

== Playing career ==
Sandford played junior hockey with the St. Michael's Majors and led the team to the Memorial Cup playoffs in 1945-46 and 1946-77. In the latter season, Sandford led the Ontario Hockey Association with 67 points in 27 games, and scored 24 points in nine OHA playoff games and 28 points in ten Memorial Cup games, en route to St. Michael's third Memorial Cup title. He was awarded the Red Tilson Trophy as the OHA's most valuable player.

Sandford was signed by the Boston Bruins in 1947. He appeared in the NHL All-Star Game in five consecutive seasons from 1951 to 1955. In 1952-53 he led all scorers in the playoffs with eight goals and eleven points. His best season was 1953-54, when he scored 16 goals and 31 assists for 47 points and finished in the top ten in league scoring. The next season, he succeeded the retiring Milt Schmidt as Bruins' captain.

After eight seasons with the Bruins, Sandford was traded in 1955 in a nine-player deal — the largest in NHL history to that date — to the Detroit Red Wings. After four games for Detroit, the Wings dealt him to the Chicago Black Hawks, where he finished the season before retiring. He scored 106 goals and 145 assists for 251 points in 503 games and served 355 minutes in penalties.

In 2023 he was named One of the Top 100 Best Bruins Players of all Time.

== Retirement ==
For many years after his playing days, Sandford served in various off-ice capacities for the Bruins, as a goal judge, official scorer, and supervisor of off-ice officials. He became a curling enthusiast and was a member of the Bruins' first alumni team. In 2001, the Society for International Hockey Research, in collaboration with the Hockey Hall of Fame and The Hockey News, selected a list of retroactive Conn Smythe Trophy winners for the NHL playoff MVP before the trophy was officially presented in 1965, and selected Sandford for the 1953 playoffs.

Sandford died on October 25, 2023, at the age of 95.

== Career statistics ==
			Regular season					Playoffs
Season	Team	League	GP	G	A	Pts	PIM	GP	G	A	Pts	PIM
1943–44	St. Michael's Buzzers	Big-10 Jr. B	3	1	0	1	0	—	—	—	—	—
1944–45	St. Michael's Buzzers	Big-10 Jr. B	11	12	11	23	9	11	10	14	24	8
1945–46	Toronto St. Michael's Majors	OHA-Jr.	26	10	9	19	28	11	5	5	10	12
1946–47	Toronto St. Michael's Majors	OHA-Jr.	27	30	37	67	38	9	12	12	24	31
1946–47	Toronto St. Michael's Majors	M-Cup	—	—	—	—	—	10	11	17	28	26
1947–48	Boston Bruins	NHL	59	10	15	25	25	5	1	0	1	0
1948–49	Boston Bruins	NHL	56	16	20	36	57	5	1	3	4	2
1949–50	Boston Bruins	NHL	19	1	4	5	6	—	—	—	—	—
1950–51	Boston Bruins	NHL	51	10	13	23	33	6	0	1	1	4
1951–52	Boston Bruins	NHL	65	13	12	25	54	7	2	2	4	0
1952–53	Boston Olympics	EAHL	2	1	0	1	0	—	—	—	—	—
1952–53	Boston Bruins	NHL	61	14	21	35	44	11	8	3	11	11
1953–54	Boston Bruins	NHL	70	16	31	47	42	3	0	1	1	4
1954–55	Boston Bruins	NHL	60	14	20	34	38	5	1	1	2	6
1955–56	Detroit Red Wings	NHL	4	0	0	0	0	—	—	—	—	—
1955–56	Chicago Black Hawks	NHL	57	12	9	21	56	—	—	—	—	—
NHL totals			502	106	145	251	355	42	13	11	24	27

Preceded by Milt Schmidt	Boston Bruins captain 1954–55	Succeeded by Fernie Flaman
