= Dave Creighton =

Canadian ice hockey player (1930-2017)

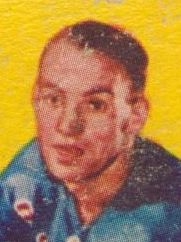
- Dave Creighton in 1957 Topps card
- Born: June 24, 1930 Port Arthur, Ontario, Canada
- Died: August 18, 2017 (aged 87) Wesley Chapel, Florida, US
- Height: 6 ft 1 in (185 cm)
- Weight: 181 lb (82 kg; 12 st 13 lb)
- Position: Centre
- Shot: Left
- Played for: Boston Bruins; Toronto Maple Leafs; Chicago Black Hawks; New York Rangers
- Playing career: 1948–1969

David Theodore Creighton (June 24, 1930 – August 18, 2017) was a Canadian ice hockey forward. Creighton started his National Hockey League career with the Boston Bruins in 1948. He would also play with the Toronto Maple Leafs, Chicago Black Hawks, and New York Rangers. On August 18, 1955, the Detroit Red Wings traded Creighton and Bronco Horvath to the New York Rangers in exchange for Aggie Kukulowicz and Billy Dea. He left the NHL after the 1960 season. He played several more seasons in the AHL before retiring after the 1969 season. After this, he coached the Providence Reds from 1969 to 1970. His son Adam also played in the NHL.

== Career statistics ==
			Regular season					Playoffs
Season	Team	League	GP	G	A	Pts	PIM	GP	G	A	Pts	PIM
1946–47	Port Arthur Bruins	TBJHL	6	8	7	15	2	4	5	3	8	0
1946–47	Fort William K of C	MC	—	—	—	—	—	4	1	0	1	10
1947–48	Port Arthur Bruins	TBJHL	9	19	12	31	4	5	5	4	9	4
1947–48	Port Arthur Bruins	MC	—	—	—	—	—	17	21	15	36	16
1948–49	Boston Bruins	NHL	12	1	3	4	0	3	0	0	0	0
1948–49	Hershey Bears	AHL	49	19	18	37	12	—	—	—	—	—
1949–50	Boston Bruins	NHL	64	18	13	31	13	—	—	—	—	—
1950–51	Boston Bruins	NHL	56	5	4	9	4	5	0	1	1	0
1950–51	Hershey Bears	AHL	11	2	5	7	0	—	—	—	—	—
1951–52	Boston Bruins	NHL	49	20	17	37	18	7	2	1	3	2
1952–53	Boston Bruins	NHL	45	8	8	16	14	11	4	5	9	10
1953–54	Boston Bruins	NHL	69	20	20	40	27	4	0	0	0	0
1954–55	Toronto Maple Leafs	NHL	14	2	1	3	8	—	—	—	—	—
1954–55	Chicago Black Hawks	NHL	49	7	7	14	6	—	—	—	—	—
1955–56	New York Rangers	NHL	70	20	31	51	43	5	0	0	0	4
1956–57	New York Rangers	NHL	70	18	21	39	42	5	2	2	4	2
1957–58	New York Rangers	NHL	70	17	35	52	40	6	3	3	6	2
1958–59	Toronto Maple Leafs	NHL	34	3	9	12	4	5	0	1	1	0
1958–59	Rochester Americans	AHL	33	14	17	31	46	5	1	3	4	4
1959–60	Toronto Maple Leafs	NHL	14	1	5	6	4	—	—	—	—	—
1959–60	Rochester Americans	AHL	58	25	34	59	30	12	3	3	6	10
1960–61	Rochester Americans	AHL	71	30	42	72	31	—	—	—	—	—
1961–62	Buffalo Bisons	AHL	68	21	48	69	54	11	2	6	8	4
1962–63	Baltimore Clippers	AHL	71	24	48	72	14	3	1	2	3	25
1963–64	Baltimore Clippers	AHL	72	17	25	42	20	—	—	—	—	—
1964–65	Baltimore Clippers	AHL	62	23	28	51	10	5	2	2	4	6
1965–66	Baltimore Clippers	AHL	14	3	2	5	2	—	—	—	—	—
1965–66	Providence Reds	AHL	56	16	37	53	14	—	—	—	—	—
1966–67	Providence Reds	AHL	72	22	42	64	63	—	—	—	—	—
1967–68	Providence Reds	AHL	72	22	53	75	54	8	6	2	8	0
1968–69	Providence Reds	AHL	72	11	20	31	36	1	0	0	0	0
NHL totals			616	140	174	314	223	51	11	13	24	20
AHL totals			800	258	434	692	390	45	15	18	33	49
