= Gordon Henry (ice hockey) =

Canadian ice hockey player

- Born: August 17, 1926 Owen Sound, Ontario, Canada
- Died: October 3, 1972 (aged 46) Owen Sound, Ontario, Canada
- Height: 6 ft 0 in (183 cm)
- Weight: 175 lb (79 kg; 12 st 7 lb)
- Position: Goaltender
- Caught: Left
- Played for: Boston Bruins
- Playing career: 1943–1956

Gordon David Henry (August 17, 1926 – October 3, 1972) was a Canadian ice hockey goaltender for the Boston Bruins.

== Career ==
Henry played three regular season games and five playoff games in the National Hockey League with the Boston Bruins between 1949 and 1951. The rest of his career, which lasted from 1943 to 1956, was mainly spent in the Eastern Amateur Hockey League and American Hockey League.

== Career statistics ==
=== Regular season and playoffs ===
			Regular season								Playoffs
Season	Team	League	GP	W	L	T	MIN	GA	SO	GAA	GP	W	L	MIN	GA	SO	GAA
1940–41	Owen Sound Orphans	OHA	—	—	—	—	—	—	—	—	—	—	—	—	—	—	—
1941–42	Owen Sound Orphans	OHA	—	—	—	—	—	—	—	—	—	—	—	—	—	—	—
1942–43	Owen Sound Orphans	OHA	—	—	—	—	—	—	—	—	—	—	—	—	—	—	—
1943–44	Philadelphia Falcons	EAHL	28	—	—	—	1680	129	1	4.61	12	6	6	720	52	0	4.33
1944–45	Hershey Bears	AHL	3	1	1	1	180	10	0	3.33	—	—	—	—	—	—	—
1944–45	Philadelphia Falcons	EAHL	35	—	—	—	—	—	—	—	12	—	—	720	47	1	3.92
1945–46	Hershey Bears	AHL	16	6	5	5	960	61	0	3.81	3	1	2	180	10	1	3.33
1945–46	Baltimore Clippers	EAHL	4	—	—	—	240	27	0	5.50	—	—	—	—	—	—	—
1945–46	Philadelphia Falcons	EAHL	1	—	—	—	60	3	0	3.00	—	—	—	—	—	—	—
1945–46	New York Rovers	EAHL	1	1	0	0	60	0	1	0.00	—	—	—	—	—	—	—
1946–47	Boston Olympics	EAHL	43	21	17	5	2580	201	1	4.67	—	—	—	—	—	—	—
1946–47	Hershey Bears	AHL	5	2	1	1	260	13	0	3.00	11	8	3	660	16	5	1.45
1947–48	Hershey Bears	AHL	68	25	30	13	4080	273	1	4.01	1	0	0	20	2	0	6.00
1948–49	Boston Bruins	NHL	1	1	0	0	60	0	1	0.00	—	—	—	—	—	—	—
1948–49	Hershey Bears	AHL	66	28	33	5	3960	249	3	3.71	11	7	4	694	26	1	2.25
1949–50	Boston Bruins	NHL	2	0	2	0	120	5	0	2.50	—	—	—	—	—	—	—
1949–50	Hershey Bears	AHL	64	19	35	10	3840	270	1	4.22	—	—	—	—	—	—	—
1950–51	Hershey Bears	AHL	70	38	28	4	4270	242	3	3.40	—	—	—	—	—	—	—
1950–51	Boston Bruins	NHL	—	—	—	—	—	—	—	—	2	0	2	120	10	0	5.00
1951–52	Hershey Bears	AHL	68	35	28	5	4120	211	4	3.07	5	1	4	348	14	0	2.42
1952–53	Hershey Bears	AHL	64	31	32	1	3870	214	5	3.32	—	—	—	—	—	—	—
1952–53	Boston Bruins	NHL	—	—	—	—	—	—	—	—	3	1	2	163	10	0	3.68
1953–54	Hershey Bears	AHL	63	33	26	4	3780	211	1	3.35	9	4	5	570	24	1	2.53
1954–55	Hershey Bears	AHL	23	9	11	3	1380	85	0	3.70	—	—	—	—	—	—	—
1955–56	Owen Sound Mercurys	OHA Sr	22	—	—	—	1280	77	1	3.61	3	—	—	180	11	0	3.67
1956–57	Philadelphia Ramblers	EHL	1	0	1	0	60	6	0	6.00	—	—	—	—	—	—	—
1961–62	Charlotte Checkers	EHL	2	—	—	—	—	—	—	5.50	—	—	—	—	—	—	—
AHL totals			510	227	230	52	30,700	1566	18	3.06	40	21	18	2472	92	8	2.23
NHL totals			3	1	2	0	180	5	1	1.67	5	1	4	283	20	0	4.24
