= Marty Pavelich =

Canadian ice hockey player (1927–2024)

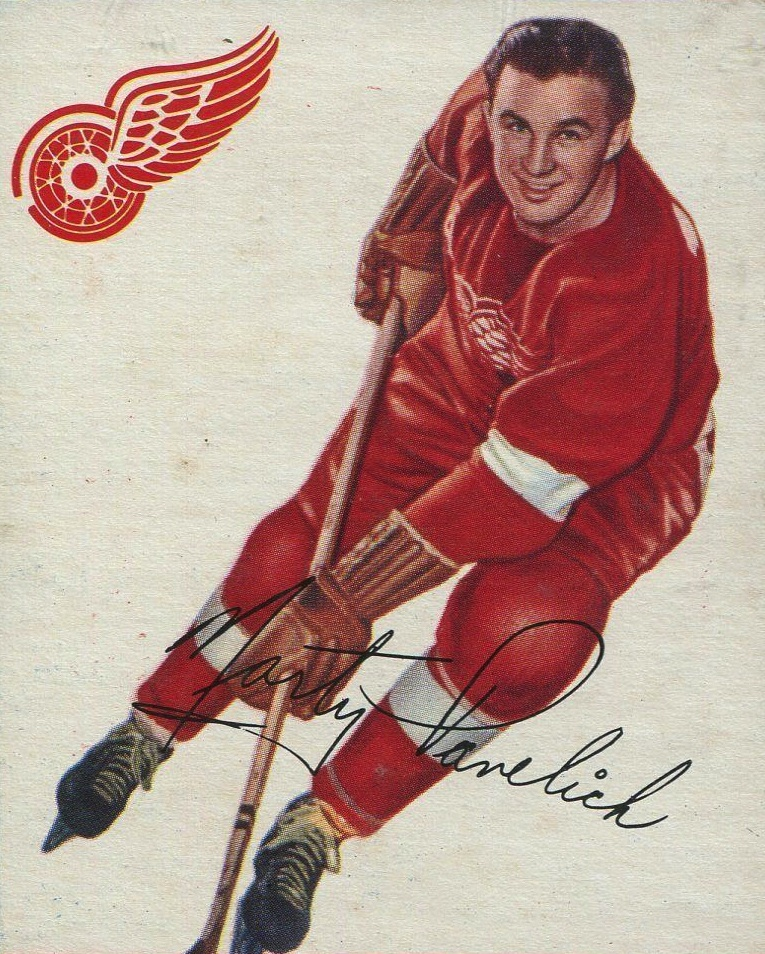
- Pavelich on a 1954 Topps card
- Born: November 6, 1927 Sault Ste. Marie, Ontario, Canada
- Died: June 28, 2024 (aged 96) Big Sky, Montana, U.S.
- Height: 5 ft 11 in (180 cm)
- Weight: 168 lb (76 kg; 12 st 0 lb)
- Position: Left wing
- Shot: Left
- Played for: Detroit Red Wings
- Playing career: 1944–1957

Martin Nicholas Pavelich (November 6, 1927 – June 28, 2024) was a Canadian ice hockey left winger. He played ten seasons for the Detroit Red Wings of the National Hockey League from 1947 until 1957. Pavelich was the last surviving member of the Red Wings 1950 Stanley Cup team.

== Early career ==
Pavelich played three seasons (1944–47) of junior-league hockey with the Ontario Hockey Association (OHA) Galt Red Wings in Galt, Ontario. He played 74 regular season games for the team, scoring 52 goals, with 66 assists for 118 points.

== NHL career ==
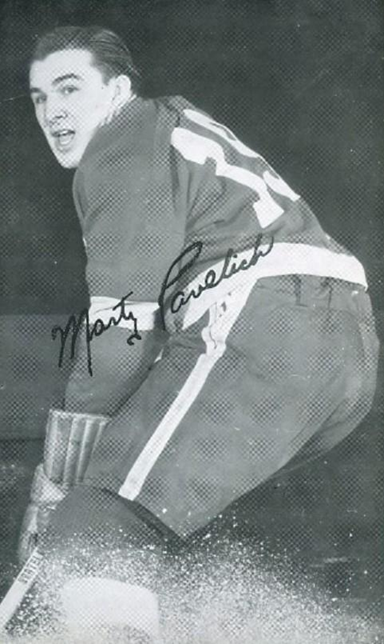
1947 postcard of Pavelich for Detroit Red Wings

Pavelich joined the Detroit Red Wings in 1947. He played 634 regular season NHL games, scoring 93 goals and 159 assists for 252 points. His post-season record is 13 goals and 15 assists for 28 points in 93 games. The Red Wings won the Stanley Cup four times (1950, 1952, 1954, 1955) during his career and he played in the NHL all-star games for those seasons.

Pavelich was regarded as an unsung hero of the early 1950s powerhouse Red Wing squad that also included Gordie Howe and Ted Lindsay. Wings manager, Jack Adams, referred to Pavelich as "one of the four key men around whom we build our hockey club." Hockey journalist Stan Fischler, ranked him as the 4th best defensive forward of all time in his book Hockey's 100: A Personal Ranking of the Best Players in Hockey History. Considered one of the best "shadows" of his time, his role was to check other team's top scorers, including the likes of Maurice "Rocket" Richard.

== Later life and death ==
Pavelich left the Red Wings at the end of the 1956-57 season. He and Ted Lindsay ran a successful plastics manufacturing business together that supplied parts to the automotive industry. He rejected a 1958 contract that called for a minor-league option. "I told him I could get him a $7,000 base salary in the minors, which is a good contract, but Marty said he'd retire first," Detroit General Manager Jack Adams said. Pavelich retired after the 1956-57 season, rather than risk being moved away from the Wings and his business.

He later retired to Big Sky, Montana in the early 1990s. Pavelich died at his home in Montana on June 28, 2024, at the age of 96. He had been diagnosed with amyotrophic lateral sclerosis in the prior month.

== Career statistics ==
			Regular season					Playoffs
Season	Team	League	GP	G	A	Pts	PIM	GP	G	A	Pts	PIM
1944–45	Galt Red Wings	OHA-Jr.	21	8	12	20	10	9	7	5	12	6
1945–46	Galt Red Wings	OHA-Jr.	25	22	26	48	18	5	2	1	3	5
1946–47	Galt Red Wings	OHA-Jr.	28	22	28	50	32	9	4	5	9	6
1947–48	Detroit Red Wings	NHL	41	4	8	12	10	10	2	2	4	6
1947–48	Indianapolis Capitals	AHL	26	3	14	17	21	—	—	—	—	—
1948–49	Detroit Red Wings	NHL	60	10	16	26	40	9	0	1	1	8
1949–50	Detroit Red Wings	NHL	65	8	15	23	58	14	4	2	6	13
1949–50	Indianapolis Capitals	AHL	6	2	3	5	2	—	—	—	—	—
1950–51	Detroit Red Wings	NHL	67	9	20	29	41	6	0	1	1	2
1951–52	Detroit Red Wings	NHL	68	17	19	36	54	8	2	2	4	2
1952–53	Detroit Red Wings	NHL	64	13	20	33	49	6	2	1	3	7
1953–54	Detroit Red Wings	NHL	65	9	20	29	57	12	2	2	4	4
1954–55	Detroit Red Wings	NHL	70	15	15	30	59	11	1	3	4	12
1955–56	Detroit Red Wings	NHL	70	5	13	18	38	10	0	1	1	14
1956–57	Detroit Red Wings	NHL	64	3	13	16	48	5	0	0	0	6
NHL totals			634	93	159	252	454	91	13	15	28	74
