= Milt Schmidt =

Canadian ice hockey player (1918–2017)

- Hockey Hall of Fame, 1961
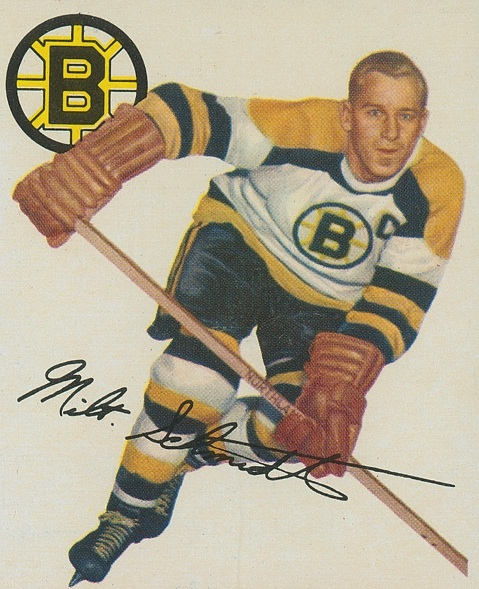
- Born: March 5, 1918 Kitchener, Ontario, Canada
- Died: January 4, 2017 (aged 98) Westwood, Massachusetts, U.S.
- Height: 6 ft 0 in (183 cm)
- Weight: 185 lb (84 kg; 13 st 3 lb)
- Position: Centre
- Shot: Left
- Played for: Boston Bruins
- Playing career: 1936–1942; 1945–1955

Milton Conrad Schmidt (March 5, 1918 – January 4, 2017) was a Canadian professional ice hockey centre, coach and general manager, mostly for the Boston Bruins of the National Hockey League (NHL), He was a member of the famed "Kraut Line" with teammates Bobby Bauer and Woody Dumart. The trio led the Bruins to two Stanley Cup championships and became the first line to finish first, second and third in NHL scoring, in 1939–40. He was elected to the Hockey Hall of Fame in 1961. In 2017, Schmidt was named one of the '100 Greatest NHL Players' in history.

After retiring as a player, Schmidt remained with the Bruins, as head coach for eleven years, then as general manager as the Bruins won two Stanley Cups in 1970 and 1972.

== Early years ==
Schmidt's early years were spent in Kitchener, where he attended King Edward Public School. In high school, he briefly attended Kitchener-Waterloo Collegiate and Vocational School, but dropped out at age 14 to work to support his family (his father had become too ill to work regularly), and took a job at a shoe factory. He made 18 cents per hour ($3.94 per hour in 2025 dollars) while working there and claimed that he knew the value of the dollar. He continued playing junior hockey with the Kitchener Empires and Kitchener Greenshirts. Schmidt was a childhood friend of fellow Hall of Famers Woody Dumart and Bobby Bauer. At the age of 20, while playing for the Boston Bruins' AHL farm team, the Providence Reds, Schmidt was invited to try out for the St. Louis Cardinals pro baseball team, but knew himself well enough from his youth baseball experience that while he could hit the ball out of the park, he would strike out many more times than hitting home runs.

== Playing career ==
=== Playing ===
Schmidt played junior hockey with Dumart and Bauer in Kitchener, Ontario, before their rights were all acquired by the Bruins in 1935. After playing a final year of junior hockey in Kitchener, Ontario, and half a year with the Providence Reds, Schmidt was called up to the Bruins during the 1937 season. He quickly proved himself to be a hardnosed centre, a skilled stick handler and smooth playmaker.

Schmidt and his childhood friends Bauer and Dumart were teamed up together in the NHL as well. They formed the Kraut Line and were a strong and dependable line for the Bruins for most of the following fifteen seasons. They were a key ingredient to the Bruins' success as they rampaged to 4 straight regular season titles and a hard-fought Stanley Cup victory in 1939. The following season Schmidt became a star, as he led the league in scoring and guided the Bruins to another first-place finish and the third-most goals in team history to date. That year the Kraut line would make history with Schmidt leading the NHL in points with 52 while Dumart and Bauer finished second and third respectively with 43 each. It was the first time in league history that three linemates finished in the top three spots in NHL scoring.

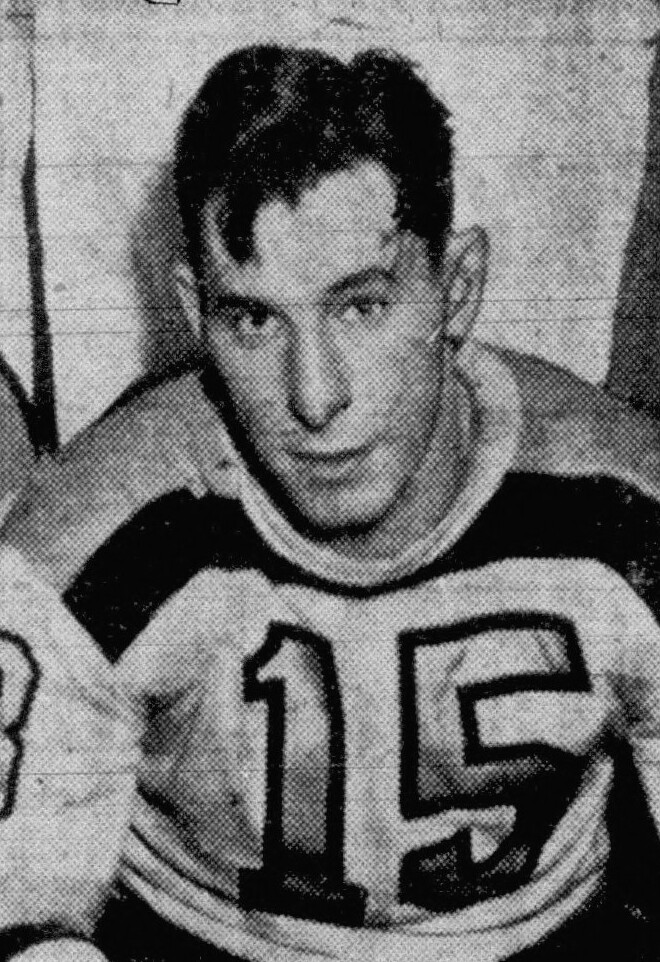
Schmidt, circa 1942

The 1941 season saw Schmidt spearhead the Bruins to their second Cup win in three years with 38 points and a postseason high 11 points in 11 playoff games. However, the powerhouse Brown and Gold were decimated by World War II the following year as Schmidt, Bauer, and Dumart were all the first players to enlist in the Canadian military, and superstar American goaltender Frank Brimsek enlisted with the United States Coast Guard. In their final game with the bruins before deployment the Kraut Line recorded eight points in a dominating victory over the Montreal Canadiens. Following the contest, players from both teams fêted the trio, hoisting them up on their shoulders and parading them around the ice. While training in Ottawa, The Kraut line found success playing for the Ottawa RCAF Flyers of the Quebec Senior Hockey League winning the Ottawa City Hockey League championship and the Allan Cup before heading overseas. Schmidt, Bauer, and Dumart ultimately missed three productive NHL seasons due to their service in the War. Schmidt and Dumart would serve as a member of a Bomber squadron and Bauer would serve as a radio technician.

Schmidt returned for the beginning of the 1946 season reuniting with the Kraut line. He resumed his starring ways and finished fourth in league scoring in 1947 with a career high 62 point season (27 goals 35 assists). Named captain in 1951, Schmidt won the Hart Trophy as the league's most valuable player that year having a 61 points with 22 goals and 39 assists. Schmidt would follow this up with a 50-point season the following year and would continue to put up solid numbers for the Bruins until his retirement.

In the later part of his career, Schmidt became friends with journalist Leo Monahan who travelled with the team on overnight train rides. One train ride Schmidt recalled that "Leo was in the berth above me and I was down below. Throughout the night, he told me, he did not move for fear he would do something that would keep me awake".

Schmidt retired as a player partway through the 1954–1955 season to take over head coaching duties, replacing Lynn Patrick.

=== Coaching ===
Schmidt coached the Bruins up to the 1966 season with a year and a half hiatus, leading them to the Stanley Cup Final in 1957 and 1958. He also was Boston's assistant general manager.

After coaching the Bruins for 11 seasons Schmidt was promoted to the general manager position in 1967 just as the league ushered in six new franchises, doubling in size. Schmidt proved to be a great architect in the new era of the NHL, acquiring and drafting several key players to build a Bruins team that won two more Stanley Cups in 1970 and 1972. His biggest deal was a blockbuster as he acquired Phil Esposito, Ken Hodge and Fred Stanfield from the Chicago Black Hawks in exchange for Pit Martin, Gilles Marotte and Jack Norris.

After his long and loyal career in the Bruins organization, Schmidt left the team to become the first General Manager of the expansion Washington Capitals on April 20, 1973. Unfortunately for Schmidt, the Capitals set a benchmark in futility that still stands as an NHL record today, as the new franchise finished the year with a minuscule 21 points with the worst record in the 18-team league (8–67–5).

== Career statistics ==
=== Regular season and playoffs ===
- **Bold** indicates led league

| | | | Regular season | | | | | Playoffs |
| Season | Team | League | GP | G | A | Pts | PIM | GP | G | A | Pts | PIM |
|---|---|---|---|---|---|---|---|---|---|---|---|---|
| 1933–34 | Kitchener Empires | OHA-Jr. | 7 | 2 | 4 | 6 | 2 | 4 | 2 | 3 | 5 | 0 |
| 1933–34 | Kitchener Greenshirts | OHA-Jr. | 17 | 20 | 6 | 26 | 14 | 3 | 2 | 2 | 4 | 0 |
| 1935–36 | Kitchener Greenshirts | OHA-Jr. | 5 | 4 | 3 | 7 | 2 | 4 | 4 | 1 | 5 | 11 |
| 1936–37 | Boston Bruins | NHL | 26 | 2 | 8 | 10 | 15 | 3 | 0 | 0 | 0 | 0 |
| 1936–37 | Providence Reds | IAHL | 23 | 8 | 1 | 9 | 12 | — | — | — | — | — |
| 1937–38 | Boston Bruins | NHL | 44 | 13 | 14 | 27 | 15 | 3 | 0 | 0 | 0 | 0 |
| 1938–39 | Boston Bruins | NHL | 41 | 15 | 17 | 32 | 13 | 12 | 3 | 3 | 6 | 2 |
| 1939–40 | Boston Bruins | NHL | 48 | 22 | **30** | **52** | 37 | 6 | 0 | 0 | 0 | 4 |
| 1940–41 | Boston Bruins | NHL | 45 | 13 | 25 | 38 | 23 | 11 | 5 | 6 | **11** | 9 |
| 1941–42 | Boston Bruins | NHL | 36 | 14 | 21 | 35 | 34 | — | — | — | — | — |
| 1941–42 | Ottawa RCAF Flyers | OCHL | — | — | — | — | — | 6 | 4 | 7 | 11 | 10 |
| 1941–42 | Ottawa RCAF Flyers | Al-Cup | — | — | — | — | — | 13 | 6 | 17 | 23 | 19 |
| 1944–45 | Middleton RCAF | Exhib. | — | — | — | — | — | — | — | — | — | — |
| 1945–46 | Boston Bruins | NHL | 48 | 13 | 18 | 31 | 21 | 10 | 3 | 5 | 8 | 2 |
| 1946–47 | Boston Bruins | NHL | 59 | 27 | 35 | 62 | 40 | 5 | 3 | 1 | 4 | 4 |
| 1947–48 | Boston Bruins | NHL | 33 | 9 | 17 | 26 | 28 | 5 | 2 | 5 | 7 | 2 |
| 1948–49 | Boston Bruins | NHL | 44 | 10 | 22 | 32 | 25 | 4 | 0 | 2 | 2 | 8 |
| 1949–50 | Boston Bruins | NHL | 68 | 19 | 22 | 41 | 41 | — | — | — | — | — |
| 1950–51 | Boston Bruins | NHL | 62 | 22 | 39 | 61 | 33 | 6 | 0 | 1 | 1 | 7 |
| 1951–52 | Boston Bruins | NHL | 69 | 21 | 29 | 50 | 57 | 7 | 2 | 1 | 3 | 0 |
| 1952–53 | Boston Bruins | NHL | 68 | 11 | 23 | 34 | 30 | 10 | 5 | 1 | 6 | 6 |
| 1953–54 | Boston Bruins | NHL | 62 | 14 | 18 | 32 | 28 | 4 | 1 | 0 | 1 | 20 |
| 1954–55 | Boston Bruins | NHL | 23 | 4 | 8 | 12 | 26 | — | — | — | — | — |
| NHL totals | | | 776 | 229 | 346 | 575 | 466 | 86 | 24 | 25 | 49 | 64 |

== Career coaching record ==
| Team | Year | Regular season | | | | | | Post season |
| Team | Year | G | W | L | T | Pts | Division Rank | Result |
|---|---|---|---|---|---|---|---|---|
| Boston Bruins | 1954–55 | 40 | 13 | 12 | 15 | (41) | 4th in NHL | Lost in semi-finals |
| Boston Bruins | 1955–56 | 70 | 23 | 34 | 17 | 59 | 5th in NHL | Missed Playoffs |
| Boston Bruins | 1956–57 | 70 | 34 | 24 | 12 | 80 | 3rd in NHL | Lost in Cup Final |
| Boston Bruins | 1957–58 | 70 | 27 | 28 | 15 | 69 | 3rd in NHL | Lost in Cup Final |
| Boston Bruins | 1958–59 | 70 | 32 | 29 | 9 | 73 | 2nd in NHL | Lost in semi-final |
| Boston Bruins | 1959–60 | 70 | 28 | 34 | 8 | 64 | 5th in NHL | Missed Playoffs |
| Boston Bruins | 1960–61 | 70 | 15 | 42 | 13 | 43 | 6th in NHL | Missed Playoffs |
| Boston Bruins | 1962–63 | 56 | 13 | 31 | 12 | (38) | 6th in NHL | Missed Playoffs |
| Boston Bruins | 1963–64 | 70 | 18 | 40 | 12 | 48 | 6th in NHL | Missed Playoffs |
| Boston Bruins | 1964–65 | 70 | 21 | 43 | 6 | 43 | 6th in NHL | Missed Playoffs |
| Boston Bruins | 1965–66 | 70 | 21 | 43 | 6 | 48 | 5th in NHL | Missed Playoffs |
| Washington Capitals | 1974–75 | 8 | 2 | 6 | 0 | (4) | 5th in Norris | Missed Playoffs |
| Washington Capitals | 1975–76 | 36 | 3 | 28 | 5 | (11) | 5th in Norris | (fired) |
| Total | | 770 | 257 | 410 | 127 | | | |

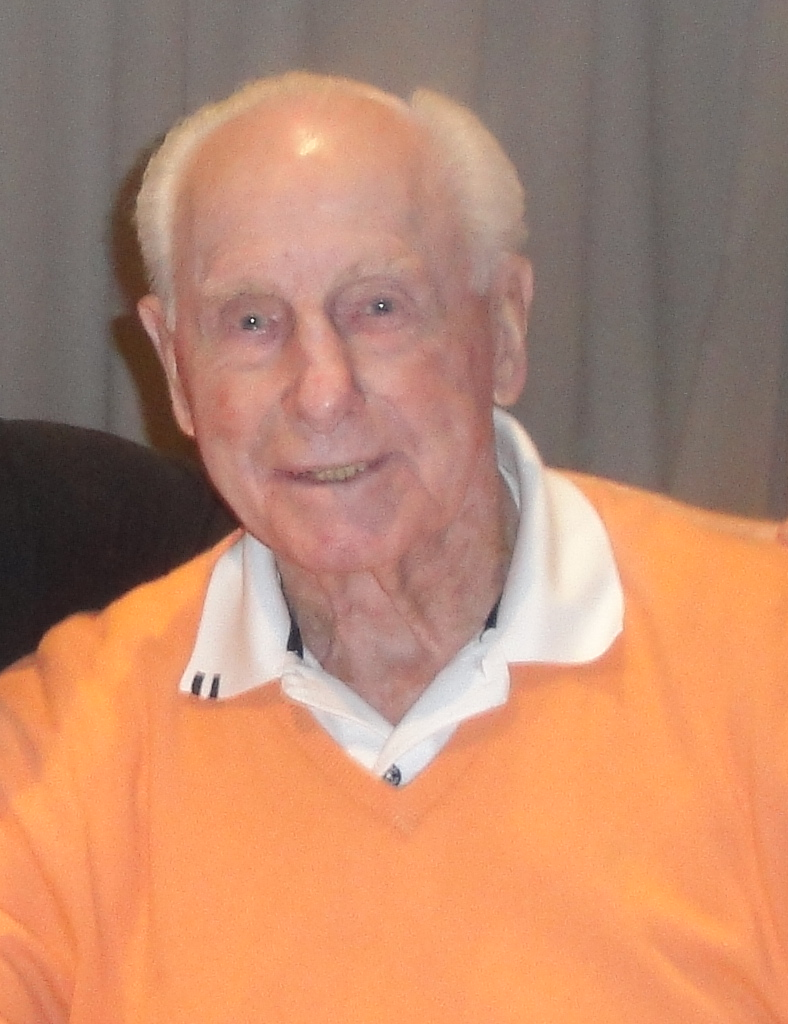
Milt Schmidt at a public autograph signing on March 6, 2011

== Retirement and death ==
Schmidt was married to his wife Marie. Together they had two children, a son named Conrad, and a daughter Nancy. After he retired from hockey management, Schmidt remained involved with the Bruins with the alumni team and the Boards and Blades Club at the Boston Garden.

Schmidt was inducted into the Hockey Hall of Fame in 1961 and his #15 jersey was retired by the Bruins. After he retired from hockey management, Schmidt remained involved with the Bruins through their alumni team and as manager of the Boards and Blades Club at the Boston Garden. On October 6, 2010, the Bruins celebrated Schmidt's 75 years with the team during Milt Schmidt Night. On this night he received 2 commemorative Stanley Cup miniatures to represent the two cups he had brought to the club, plus he raised his number to the rafters inside TD Garden. He was the last surviving member of both the Bruins' 1939 and 1941 Stanley Cup teams. Schmidt was also the last living NHL player to play in the 1930s and the last to have played against the Montreal Maroons (a team that folded in 1938). He is viewed as a legendary figure in Boston and is the only person in franchise history to serve as player to have been a captain, coach, and general manager. Former Bruins President Harry Siden referred to him along with Johnny Buyck as the quintessential Boston Bruins.

In 1975 he was inducted into the Canada Sports Hall of Fame.

In 2002 Schmidt was one of the original honorees at The Sports Museum annual tradition event, being given the hockey legacy award. He was later inducted into the Massachusetts hockey Hall of Fame in 2008.

On October 20, 2016, Schmidt along with Bobby Orr dropped the ceremonial puck at the Boston Bruins' first home game of the season.

Schmidt died after a stroke on January 4, 2017, in a retirement facility in Westwood, Massachusetts; at the age of 98; at the time of his death he was the oldest living former NHL player, and the last living player from the AHL's inaugural season. Following Schmidt's death, Chick Webster became the oldest living NHL player. Schmidt is buried alongside his wife at the Highland Cemetery in Dover, Massachusetts.

== Tribute ==
Upon hearing of Schmidt's death, NHL Commissioner Gary Bettman issued the following statement: "It would be a challenge to find anyone who took greater pride in being a Boston Bruin than Milt Schmidt did--be it as a player, an executive or an ambassador over the 80-plus years he served the franchise, the city of Boston and the National Hockey League. Milt's respect for the game was matched by his humility and was mirrored by the great respect with which his opponents, and generations of Bruins players, treated him through the years."

After Schmidt's death The Bruins honored Schmidt's legacy with a pregame tribute prior to game a game on January 5. In addition, two on-ice graphics with Schmidt's retired jersey number 15 were painted behind both nets and remained there for the entire month of January. The Bruins also worn a commemorative patch on their jerseys featuring Schmidt's number 15 for the rest of the 2016–17 season.

== Awards and achievements ==
- Stanley Cup champion - all with Boston (1939 and 1941 as a player), (1970 and 1972 as general manager)
- NHL Scoring Champion in 1940.
- NHL assists Leader in 1940
- Allen Cup champion 1942
- Named to the NHL First All-Star Team in 1940, 1947 and 1951.
- Played in NHL All-Star Game in 1947, 1948, 1951 and 1952.
- Won the Hart Trophy in 1951.
- Named to the NHL Second All-Star Team in 1952.
- inducted into the Hockey Hall of Fame in 1961
- His #15 jersey number was retired by the Boston Bruins on March 13, 1980.
- Won the Lester Patrick Trophy for contributions to hockey in 1996.
- At the time of his retirement, was fourth in NHL history in points scored and third in assists.
- Was the last active NHL player who played during the 1930s.
- The first former player to win a Stanley Cup with the same franchise as their general manager (1970), an achievement only matched by Serge Savard (1986) and Joe Sakic (2022).
- Inducted into the Canada sports Hall of Fame in 1975.
- In 1998, he was ranked number 27 on The Hockey News' list of the 100 Greatest Hockey Players.
- Inducted into the Massachusetts hockey Hall of Fame in 2008
- In January 2017, Schmidt was part of the first group of players to be named one of the '100 Greatest NHL Players' in history.
- In 2023 he was named One of the Top 100 Best Bruins Players of all Time.
- Named to the Boston Bruins all centennial team.

Sporting positions
| Preceded by Hap Emms | General Manager of the Boston Bruins; 1967–72 | Succeeded by Harry Sinden |
| Preceded by Lynn Patrick; Phil Watson | Head coach of the Boston Bruins; 1954–61; 1963–66 | Succeeded by Phil Watson; Harry Sinden |
| Preceded by Position created | General Manager of the Washington Capitals; 1974–76 | Succeeded by Max McNab |
| Preceded by George Sullivan | Head coach of the Washington Capitals; 1975 1975 | Succeeded by Tom McVie |
| Preceded by Bobby Bauer | Boston Bruins captain 1947–54 | Succeeded by Ed Sandford |
Awards and achievements
| Preceded by Chuck Rayner | Winner of the Hart Trophy; 1951 | Succeeded by Gordie Howe |
| Preceded by Toe Blake | NHL Scoring Champion; 1940 | Succeeded by Bill Cowley |
