= Gerry McNeil =

Canadian ice hockey player

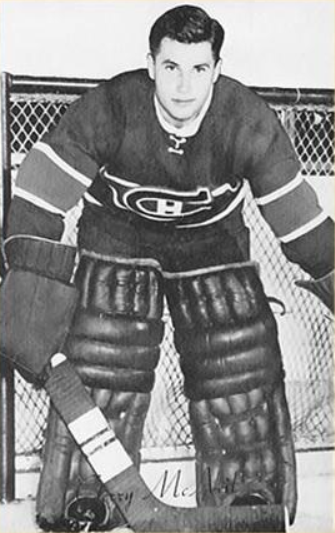
- Born: April 17, 1926 Quebec City, Quebec, Canada
- Died: June 17, 2004 (aged 78) Montreal, Quebec, Canada
- Height: 5 ft 7 in (170 cm)
- Weight: 155 lb (70 kg; 11 st 1 lb)
- Position: Goaltender
- Caught: Left
- Played for: Montreal Canadiens
- Playing career: 1947–1961

Joseph Gerald George McNeil (April 17, 1926 – June 17, 2004) was a professional ice hockey goaltender who won three Stanley Cups with the Montreal Canadiens between 1947 and 1956.

== Career ==
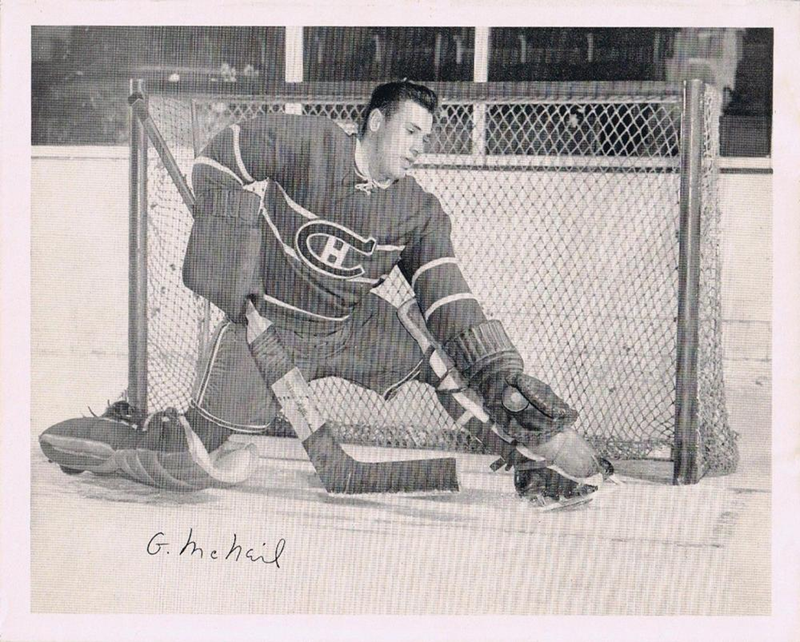
1950s photo of McNeil for Montreal Canadiens

McNeil first signed with the Canadiens in 1943 when he was only 17. While playing with their farm team, the Montreal Royals of the Quebec Senior Hockey League (QSHL), he served as a practice goalie with the Habs whenever they were in Montreal. McNeil won the Byng of Vimy award for the most valuable player three times in the QSHL, and the Royals won the Allan Cup in 1947.

McNeil was called up from the Cincinnati Mohawks of the American Hockey League (AHL) in March 1950 when Montreal's goaltender, Bill Durnan, was hit in the head with a skate blade. Teams in this era usually carried a single goalie who played every minute, barring injury. McNeil recorded a 1.50 goals against average (GAA) over six games and preserved Durnan's sixth and final Vezina Trophy, then awarded to the goalie who played the most, of the team with the fewest goals against. This rookie performance earned McNeil "the Schaefer player of the week" award. Durnan returned but felt he had lost his edge, so he announced that he would sit out a playoff game against the New York Rangers. McNeil initially refused to take "Bill's spot," so Durnan was asked to talk to his understudy in a private part of the dressing room. Both men shed tears, as the "torch" was passed down, and McNeil then succeeded Durnan as Montreal's goalie.

McNeil played every game for the Canadiens from March 1950 to November 1952, a streak that included two entire 70-game seasons, 1950–51 and 1951–52. In the 1951 Stanley Cup playoffs, McNeil went 214 minutes of shutout hockey against the powerful Detroit Red Wings, a stretch that included two marathon overtime games at the Detroit Olympia. McNeil made 38 of his 62 game one saves in extra time, a performance that prompted Jack Adams, Detroit's general manager, to remark, "It was like running into one-hit pitching your first time out. The greatest goalkeeping this team ever faced." The Canadiens won both games on goals by Maurice Richard and a stellar performance by McNeil, who was dubbed by the Detroit press, "the magician." When the Canadiens went on to eliminate the heavily-favored Red Wings, Detroit's coach, Tommy Ivan, remarked, "Gerry McNeil was the difference. He was terrific in their net." The 1951 Stanley Cup Final remain the only best-of-seven series in which every game required overtime. Bill Barilko's Cup-winning goal for the Toronto Maple Leafs against McNeil was famously captured in a photograph by Nat Turofsky, remaining part of the legend surrounding Barilko's death.

McNeil recorded ten shutouts in the 1952–53 season, making his play essential as the Canadiens only scored 155 goals in 70 games, a 2.21 goals per game rate. The last game of the regular season was against Detroit at the Olympia, and sitting at 49 goals, Gordie Howe was set to match and perhaps beat Richard's then-record of 50 in a season, set when he had scored 50 goals in 50 games in 1943-44. Howe did not score on five shots against McNeil, who was heard telling Richard after the game, "well Rock, he'll have to start over at one again." McNeil's Stanley Cup victory a few weeks later was immortalized in Wayne Johnston's novel, The Divine Ryans. He won the Cup the night before his 27th birthday with a shutout in overtime.

In the 1954 Stanley Cup Final McNeil suffered another overtime loss, this time in game seven when the puck was deflected past him by his teammate Doug Harvey. He retired that summer but returned to professional hockey a year later with the Montreal Royals. He then filled in for an asthmatic Jacques Plante at the beginning of the 1956-57 NHL season, before playing the rest of the season with the Royals. His name was engraved on the Stanley Cup for the 1957 Final, and for the 1958 Final because he was the team's playoff spare goalie. After then played two seasons with the Rochester Americans in the AHL before finishing his professional career in his hometown with the Quebec Aces.

McNeil led the Montreal Canadiens to the Stanley Cup Final all four seasons from 1950 to 1954, the seasons in which he was their number one goalie. This stretch was the first four of ten consecutive appearances in the Cup Final for the Habs.

McNeil was known to play his best when it mattered most. He finished his NHL career with a 2.32 GAA for the regular season and a 1.89 in the playoffs. He appeared in three NHL All-Star games (1951, 1952 and 1953) and posted a 2.00 GAA. His 28 regular season shutouts earned him an NHL Milestone Award in 1982.

== Personal life ==
Born to Peter McNeil and Rose Dyotte (dit Gyotte) in 1926, McNeil was married to Theresa Conway (1927–2009) for 58 years, and the couple had four children, Shannon, Karen, David, and Donna, and six grandchildren. After retiring from hockey, McNeil worked as a sales representative for several organizations. His last position was regional sales manager for Thomas Adams, a Seagram's company. He spent several winters in Panama City Beach, Florida with his hockey buddies: Elmer Lach, Ken Mosdell and Maurice Richard. He joined the first two as pallbearers at Richard's funeral in May 2000 and died of cancer in 2004.

== Career statistics ==
=== Regular season and playoffs ===
			Regular season								Playoffs
Season	Team	League	GP	W	L	T	Min	GA	SO	GAA	GP	W	L	T	Min	GA	SO	GAA
1943–44	Montreal Jr. Royals	QJHL	3	—	—	—	180	10	0	3.33	—	—	—	—	—	—	—	—
1943–44	Montreal Royals	QSHL	21	—	—	—	1260	110	1	5.24	7	3	4	0	420	30	0	4.29
1944–45	Montreal Royals	QSHL	23	18	4	1	1350	90	0	4.00	7	4	3	0	420	30	1	4.29
1945–46	Montreal Royals	QSHL	26	21	3	2	1560	87	1	3.35	11	7	2	2	660	31	0	2.82
1946–47	Montreal Royals	QSHL	40	25	13	2	2400	124	2	3.10	11	7	4	0	660	22	0	2.00
1947–48	Montreal Canadiens	NHL	2	0	1	1	95	7	0	4.42	—	—	—	—	—	—	—	—
1947–48	Montreal Royals	QSHL	47	33	14	0	2820	156	3	3.32	3	0	3	0	180	9	0	3.00
1948–49	Montreal Royals	QSHL	59	35	19	5	3540	178	5	3.02	9	3	4	0	540	25	1	2.78
1949–50	Montreal Canadiens	NHL	6	3	1	2	360	9	1	1.50	2	1	1	—	135	5	0	2.22
1949–50	Cincinnati Mohawks	AHL	55	12	30	13	3300	201	3	3.65	—	—	—	—	—	—	—	—
1950–51	Montreal Canadiens	NHL	70	25	30	15	4200	184	6	2.63	11	5	6	—	785	25	1	1.91
1951–52	Montreal Canadiens	NHL	70	34	26	10	4200	164	5	2.34	11	4	7	—	688	23	1	2.01
1952–53*	Montreal Canadiens	NHL	66	25	23	18	3960	140	10	2.12	8	5	3	—	486	16	2	1.98
1953–54	Montreal Canadiens	NHL	53	28	19	6	3180	114	6	2.15	3	2	1	—	190	3	1	0.95
1955–56	Montreal Royals	QHL	54	30	17	7	3330	128	5	2.31	19	9	10	—	1161	63	1	3.26
1956–57*	Montreal Canadiens	NHL	9	4	5	0	540	31	0	3.44	—	—	—	—	—	—	—	—
1956–57	Montreal Royals	QHL	59	26	28	4	3610	175	3	2.91	4	0	4	—	245	11	0	2.69
1957–58	Rochester Americans	AHL	68	28	34	6	4158	229	5	3.30	—	—	—	—	—	—	—	—
1957–58*	Montreal Canadiens	NHL	—	—	—	—	—	—	—	—	—	—	—	—	—	—	—	—
1958–59	Rochester Americans	AHL	66	31	30	5	4010	199	2	2.98	5	1	4	—	304	12	0	2.37
1959–60	Montreal Royals	EPHL	28	13	9	6	1680	67	5	2.39	14	8	6	—	842	34	1	2.42
1960–61	Quebec Aces	AHL	50	21	27	1	2933	176	3	3.60	—	—	—	—	—	—	—	—
NHL totals			276	119	105	52	16535	649	28	2.36	35	17	18	—	2284	72	5	1.89

- - denotes name engraved on Stanley Cup
