= Terry Sawchuk =

Canadian ice hockey player (1929–1970)

- Hockey Hall of Fame, 1971
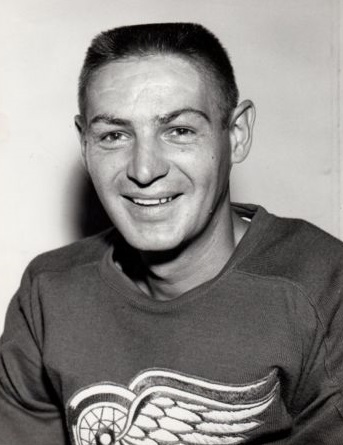
- Sawchuk with the Detroit Red Wings in 1963
- Born: December 28, 1929 Winnipeg, Manitoba, Canada
- Died: May 31, 1970 (aged 40) New York City, New York, U.S.
- Height: 5 ft 11 in (180 cm)
- Weight: 195 lb (88 kg; 13 st 13 lb)
- Position: Goaltender
- Caught: Left
- Played for: Detroit Red Wings; Boston Bruins; Toronto Maple Leafs; Los Angeles Kings; New York Rangers
- Playing career: 1949–1970

Terrance Gordon Sawchuk (December 28, 1929 – May 31, 1970) was a Canadian professional ice hockey goaltender who played 21 seasons in the National Hockey League (NHL) for the Detroit Red Wings, Boston Bruins, Toronto Maple Leafs, Los Angeles Kings, and New York Rangers between 1950 and 1970. He won the Calder Trophy, earned the Vezina Trophy four times, was a four-time Stanley Cup champion, and was elected to the Hockey Hall of Fame the year after his final season, one of 10 players for whom the three-year waiting period was waived.

At the time of his death, Sawchuk was the all-time leader among NHL goaltenders with 447 wins and with 103 shutouts. In the decades following his death, his NHL win record has been surpassed by eight goaltenders, and his NHL shutout record has been surpassed by one goaltender, though Sawchuk was the all-time leader in wins and shutouts by goaltenders who played in the Original Six era (1942–1967). In 2017, Sawchuk was named one of the "100 Greatest NHL Players".

== Early life and playing career ==
=== Childhood and junior career ===
Sawchuk was born in the North End of Winnipeg and raised there until his family moved to Bowman Avenue in East Kildonan, a working-class, formerly Ukrainian section of Winnipeg, Manitoba, Canada. He was the third of four sons and one adopted daughter of Louis Sawchuk, a tinsmith who had immigrated to Canada as a boy from Galicia, Austria-Hungary (now Ukraine), and his wife Anne (nee Maslak), a homemaker. The second son died young from scarlet fever and the oldest, an aspiring hockey goaltender whom Terry idolized, died suddenly of a heart attack at age seventeen. At age twelve, Sawchuk injured his right elbow playing rugby and, not wanting to be punished by his parents, hid the injury, preventing the dislocation from properly healing. Thus, the injury left his right arm with limited mobility and was now also several inches shorter than the left, which bothered him for his entire athletic career. After inheriting his good friend's goalie equipment, Sawchuk began playing ice hockey in a local league and worked for a sheet-metal company installing vents over bakery ovens. His goaltending talent was so evident that at age fourteen a local scout for the Detroit Red Wings had him work out with the team, who later signed him to an amateur contract and sent him to play for their junior team in Galt, Ontario, in 1946, where he also finished the eleventh grade but most likely did not graduate from high school. He excelled in many sports. He played baseball for a number of years for the Elmwood Giants first in the Manitoba Senior AA League starting in 1948, when he won the league's batting title, and then in Mandak League. He played in both the infield and the outfield.

=== Detroit Red Wings ===
The Red Wings signed Sawchuk to a professional contract in 1947, and he quickly progressed through their developmental system, winning honours as the Rookie of the Year in both the U.S. and American Hockey Leagues. Sawchuk also filled in for seven games when the Detroit goalie Harry Lumley was injured in January 1950. Sawchuk showed such promise that the Red Wings traded Lumley to the Chicago Black Hawks, though he had just led the team to the 1950 Stanley Cup. Nicknamed "Ukey" or "The Uke" by his teammates because of his Ukrainian ancestry, Sawchuk led the Red Wings to three Stanley Cup wins in five years, winning the Calder Memorial Trophy as the top rookie and three Vezina Trophies for the fewest goals allowed (he missed out the other two years by one goal). He was selected as an All-Star five times in his first five years in the NHL, had fifty-six shutouts, and his goals-against average (GAA) remained under 2.00. In the 1951–52 playoffs, the Red Wings swept both the Toronto Maple Leafs and the Montreal Canadiens, with Sawchuk surrendering five goals in eight games (for a 0.625 GAA), with four shutouts. During the last of these eight games, the Legend of the Octopus began as the first of the eight-limbed molluscs was hurled onto the ice from the stands.

Sawchuk was ordered by Detroit general manager Jack Adams to lose weight before the 1951–52 season. After his weight loss, his personality seemed to change and he became sullen and withdrawn. He became increasingly surly with reporters and fans, preferring to do crossword puzzles than give interviews. He also struggled for years to regain the weight. Also contributing to his moodiness and self-doubt was the pressure of playing every day despite repeated injuries — there were no backup goaltenders. He frequently played through pain, and during his career he had three operations on his right elbow, an appendectomy, countless cuts and bruises, a broken foot, a collapsed lung, ruptured discs in his back, and severed tendons in his hand. A standup goaltender, he adopted a crouching stance to see through the legs of skaters. Years of crouching in the net caused Sawchuk to walk with a permanent stoop and resulted in lordosis (swayback), which prevented him from sleeping for more than two hours at a time. He also received approximately 400 stitches to his face (including three in his right eyeball) before finally adopting a protective facemask in 1962. In 1966, Life Magazine had a make-up artist apply stitches and scars to Sawchuk's face to demonstrate all of the injuries his face sustained over the years. The make-up artist did not have enough room for everything.

=== Boston Bruins; return to Detroit; Toronto and Los Angeles ===
The Red Wings traded Sawchuk to the Boston Bruins on June 3, 1955, because they had a capable younger goaltender in the minor leagues (Glenn Hall). This devastated Sawchuk. During his second season with Boston, Sawchuk was diagnosed with mononucleosis, but returned to the team after only two weeks. Physically weak, playing poorly, and on the verge of a nervous breakdown and exhaustion, he announced his retirement in early 1957 and was labeled a "quitter" by team executives and several newspapers. Detroit reacquired Sawchuk by trading young forward Johnny Bucyk to Boston on June 10, 1957. After seven seasons, when they had another promising young goalie (Roger Crozier) ready for promotion from the minor leagues, Detroit left Sawchuk unprotected in the 1964 NHL Intra-League Draft, and he was quickly claimed by the Maple Leafs on June 10, 1964. With Sawchuk sharing goaltending duties with the forty-year-old Johnny Bower, the veteran duo won the 1964–65 Vezina Trophy and led Toronto to the 1967 Stanley Cup. In Sawchuk's last game with the Maple Leafs, he stopped 40 of 41 shots in a 3–1 victory over the Montreal Canadiens in the Cup-clinching game six. Left unprotected in the June 1967 expansion draft, Sawchuk was the first player selected, taken by the Los Angeles Kings where he played one season before being traded back to Detroit.

=== New York Rangers ===
In June 1969, the Red Wings traded Sawchuk and Sandy Snow to the New York Rangers for Larry Jeffrey. Sawchuk played sparingly for the Rangers, starting only six games. On February 1, 1970, in only his fourth start of the season, he recorded the 103rd and final shutout of his career by blanking the Pittsburgh Penguins 6–0. This was also his last NHL win. His last regular season start was on March 14, 1970, a 7–4 loss to the Chicago Black Hawks. Sawchuk's last playoff start was in a 5–3 playoff quarterfinals loss to the Bruins on April 9, 1970. Sawchuk appeared in his last NHL game on April 14 in the same playoff series. In game five, after Phil Esposito had scored at 7:59 of the third period to put Boston in the lead, Rangers coach Emile Francis, in an effort to slow down the game, replaced goalie Ed Giacomin with Sawchuk. He was in the net for less than a minute before Giacomin returned and the Rangers lost the game 3–2. Boston went on to win the series four games to two.

== Personal life ==
Sawchuk married Patricia Ann Bowman Morey on August 6, 1953, after a brief courtship. They had seven children, and the family endured many years of Sawchuk's increasing alcoholism, philandering (he impregnated a Toronto girlfriend in 1967), and verbal and physical abuse. Morey threatened to divorce him numerous times, and finally did so in 1969.

== Death ==
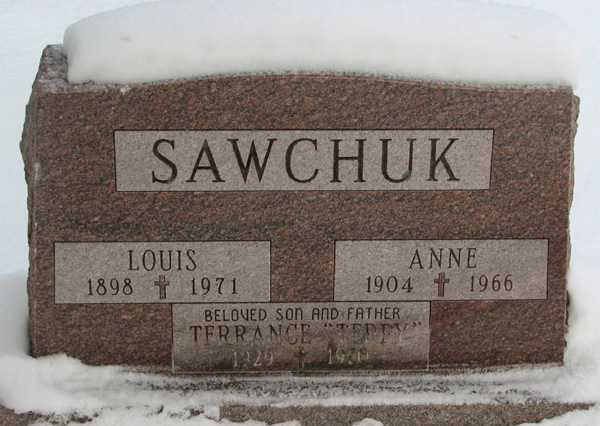
Tombstone of Terry Sawchuk, at Mt. Hope Cemetery in Pontiac, Michigan.

Sawchuk struggled with untreated depression, a condition that often affected his conduct. On April 29, 1970, after the 1969–70 season ended, Sawchuk and Rangers teammate Ron Stewart, both of whom had been drinking, physically fought over expenses for the house they rented together on Long Island, New York. Sawchuk suffered severe internal injuries during the scuffle from falling on top of Stewart's bent knee. At Long Beach Memorial Hospital, Sawchuk's gallbladder was removed and he had a second operation on his damaged and bleeding liver. The press described the incident as "horseplay", and Sawchuk told the police that he accepted full responsibility for the events.

At New York Hospital Manhattan, another operation was performed on Sawchuk's bleeding liver. He never recovered and died shortly thereafter from a pulmonary embolism on May 31, 1970, at the age of 40. The last reporter to speak to him, a week before his death, was Shirley Fischler (wife of Stan Fischler), who went to see him in the hospital as a visitor, not identifying herself as a reporter. Sawchuk told her the incident with Stewart "was just a fluke, a complete fluke accident." Fischler described him as "so pale and thin that the scars had almost disappeared from his face." A Nassau County grand jury exonerated Stewart and ruled that Sawchuk's death was accidental. Sawchuk was buried in Mount Hope Cemetery in Pontiac, Michigan.

== Legacy ==
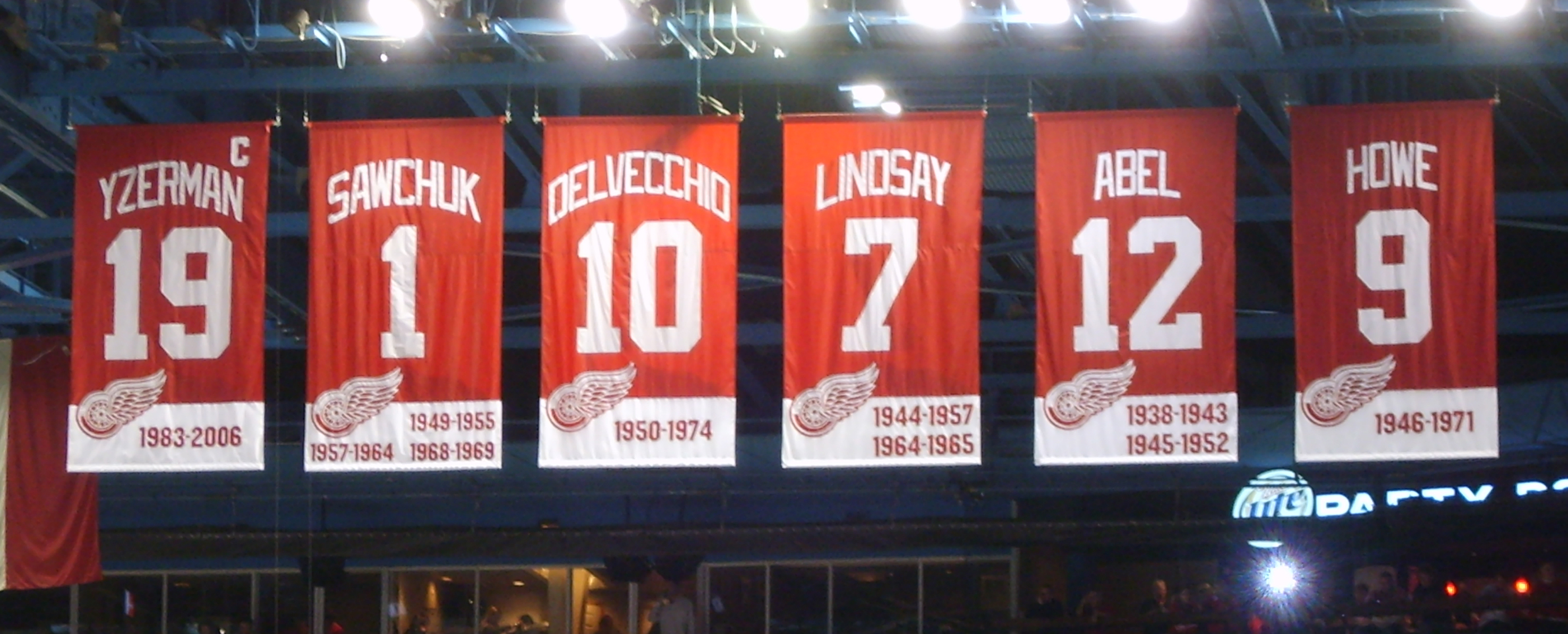
Sawchuk's #1 banner hanging in Joe Louis Arena.

During his career, Sawchuk won 501 games (447 regular season and 54 playoff), while recording 115 shutouts, (103 in the regular season and 12 in the playoffs). Sawchuk set the standard for measuring goaltenders, and was publicly hailed as the "best goalie ever" by a rival general manager in 1952, during only his second season. He was the first goaltender to 400 wins, doing so in the 1964–65 NHL season. Sawchuk finished his hockey career with 447 wins, a record that stood for thirty years, and his career record of 103 shutouts remained unsurpassed among NHL goaltenders, until Martin Brodeur bested that mark on December 21, 2009. In 1971, Sawchuk was posthumously elected to the Hockey Hall of Fame and awarded the Lester Patrick Trophy for his contribution to hockey in the United States. The Red Wings retired his number 1 on March 6, 1994, with Sawchuk's relatives being part of the hoisting of the jersey, the fourth retired by the Red Wings. Sawchuk's teammates in Gordie Howe, Ted Lindsay, and Alex Delvecchio (all of whom had their numbers retired by Detroit) attended the ceremony alongside defenceman Marcel Pronovost. In 1996, the book Shutout: The Legend of Terry Sawchuk by sports author Brian Kendall, was published. A second book Sawchuk: The troubles and triumphs of the World's Greatest Goalie was published in 1998 by David Dupuis, with the participation of the Sawchuk family. In 2001, he was honoured with his image on a Canadian postage stamp, even though he had become a U.S. citizen in 1959. In 2008, Night Work: The Sawchuk Poems, a book of poetry about Sawchuk by Randall Maggs, was published. The Terry Sawchuk Arena in his hometown of Winnipeg is named in his honour. In 2019, a film about his life and times was released, titled Goalie. Newfoundland singer-songwriter Ron Hynes recorded a ballad in 'Sawchuk', released October 12, 2010 for Borealis Records.

When Sawchuk joined the Maple Leafs, he originally wore jersey number 24 but he switched to 30. In the decades since, NHL goaltenders have chosen numbers in the 30s inspired by his example and that of players like the Canadiens' Patrick Roy, who would have used 30 (the jersey number Rogie Vachon had used), but he was forced to pick another since it was already taken by right winger Chris Nilan (he instead chose 33, which itself became popular as a choice).

== Awards and achievements ==
- USHL Rookie of the Year (1948)
- AHL Rookie of the Year (1949)
- Calder Memorial Trophy winner (1951)
- NHL All-Star Game (1950, 1951, 1952, 1953, 1954, 1955, 1956, 1959, 1963, 1964, and 1968)
- NHL First All-Star Team (1951, 1952, and 1953)
- NHL Second All-Star Team (1954, 1955, 1959, and 1963)
- Vezina Trophy winner (1952, 1953, 1955, and 1965)
- Stanley Cup championships (1952, 1954, 1955, and 1967)
- Lester Patrick Trophy winner (1971)
- First goaltender to record 100 career regular-season shutouts (1967)
- Inducted into the Hockey Hall of Fame in 1971
- Inducted into the Manitoba Sports Hall of Fame and Museum in 1982
- In 1998, he was ranked number 9 on The Hockey News' list of the 100 Greatest Hockey Players, the highest-ranking goaltender
- Detroit Red Wings #1 retired on March 6, 1994
- Selected to Manitoba's All-Century First All-Star Team
- Selected as Manitoba's Player of the Century
- Honoured Member of the Manitoba Hockey Hall of Fame
- Inducted into the Canada's Sports Hall of Fame in 1975.
- In January 2017, Sawchuk was part of the first group of players to be named '100 Greatest NHL Players' in history.

== Records ==
- NHL record - Career ties leader - 172.
- Sawchuk's NHL record for career shutouts (103) stood until broken by Martin Brodeur in 2009. Sawchuk held the record for shutouts for 46 years. He passed George Hainsworth with his 95th shutout on January 18, 1964, for the all-time shutout record.

== Career statistics ==
=== Regular season and playoffs ===
Bold indicates led league
Bold italics indicate NHL record

			Regular season									Playoffs
Season	Team	League	GP	W	L	T	MIN	GA	SO	GAA	SV%	GP	W	L	MIN	GA	SO	GAA	SV%
1945–46	Winnipeg Rangers	MJHL	10	8	2	1	600	58	0	5.80	—	2	0	2	120	12	0	6.00	—
1946–47	Galt Red Wings	OHA	30	—	—	—	1800	94	4	3.13	—	2	0	2	125	9	0	4.32	—
1947–48	Windsor Spitfires	IHL	3	3	0	0	180	5	0	1.67	—	—	—	—	—	—	—	—	—
1947–48	Omaha Knights	USHL	54	30	18	5	3248	174	4	3.21	—	3	1	2	180	9	0	3.00	—
1948–49	Indianapolis Capitals	AHL	67	38	17	2	4020	205	2	3.06	—	2	0	2	120	9	0	4.50	—
1949–50	Indianapolis Capitals	AHL	61	31	20	10	3660	188	3	3.08	—	8	8	0	480	12	0	1.50	—
1949–50	Detroit Red Wings	NHL	7	4	3	0	420	16	1	2.29	—	—	—	—	—	—	—	—	—
1950–51	Detroit Red Wings	NHL	**70**	**44**	13	13	**4200**	138	**11**	1.97	—	6	2	4	463	13	1	1.68	—
1951–52	Detroit Red Wings	NHL	**70**	**44**	14	12	**4200**	133	**12**	**1.90**	—	8	**8**	0	480	5	**4**	**0.63**	—
1952–53	Detroit Red Wings	NHL	63	**32**	15	16	3780	119	9	**1.89**	—	6	2	**4**	372	21	1	3.38	—
1953–54	Detroit Red Wings	NHL	67	**35**	19	**13**	4004	129	12	1.93	—	**12**	**8**	**4**	**751**	**20**	**2**	1.60	—
1954–55	Detroit Red Wings	NHL	68	**40**	17	11	4040	132	**12**	1.96	—	11	**8**	3	**660**	26	**1**	**2.36**	.893
1955–56	Boston Bruins	NHL	68	22	**33**	13	4078	177	9	2.60	.916	—	—	—	—	—	—	—	—
1956–57	Boston Bruins	NHL	34	18	10	6	2040	81	2	2.38	.920	—	—	—	—	—	—	—	—
1957–58	Detroit Red Wings	NHL	**70**	29	29	**12**	**4198**	206	3	2.94	.905	4	0	4	252	19	0	4.53	.855
1958–59	Detroit Red Wings	NHL	67	23	**36**	8	4019	207	5	3.09	.896	—	—	—	—	—	—	—	—
1959–60	Detroit Red Wings	NHL	58	24	20	**14**	3476	154	5	2.66	.909	6	2	4	405	19	0	2.82	.899
1960–61	Detroit Red Wings	NHL	37	11	17	8	2148	112	2	3.13	.897	8	5	3	465	18	1	2.32	.921
1961–62	Detroit Red Wings	NHL	43	14	21	8	2580	141	5	3.28	.888	—	—	—	—	—	—	—	—
1962–63	Detroit Red Wings	NHL	48	21	16	7	2760	117	3	2.54	.912	**11**	5	**6**	**660**	**35**	0	3.18	.893
1963–64	Detroit Red Wings	NHL	53	25	20	7	3139	138	5	2.64	.916	13	6	5	677	**31**	1	2.75	.912
1964–65	Toronto Maple Leafs	NHL	36	16	13	7	2160	92	1	2.56	.915	1	0	1	60	3	0	3.00	.923
1965–66	Toronto Maple Leafs	NHL	27	10	11	3	1519	80	1	3.16	.903	2	0	2	120	6	0	3.00	.917
1966–67	Toronto Maple Leafs	NHL	28	16	6	3	1409	66	2	2.81	.917	**10**	**6**	**4**	**563**	**25**	0	2.66	**.931**
1967–68	Los Angeles Kings	NHL	36	10	17	5	1934	99	2	3.07	.891	5	2	3	280	18	**1**	3.86	.871
1968–69	Detroit Red Wings	NHL	13	4	5	3	640	28	0	2.63	.912	—	—	—	—	—	—	—	—
1969–70	New York Rangers	NHL	8	3	1	2	412	20	1	2.91	.893	3	0	1	80	6	0	4.51	.872
NHL totals			971	445	336	171	57,156	2,385	103	2.50	—	106	54	47	6,288	265	12	2.53	—

== See also ==
- List of ice hockey players who died during their playing career
- List of NHL goaltenders with 300 wins
- All-time regular season NHL shutouts

Preceded by Jack Gelineau	Winner of the Calder Memorial Trophy; 1951	Succeeded by Bernie Geoffrion
Preceded by Al Rollins	Winner of the Vezina Trophy; 1952, 1953	Succeeded by Harry Lumley
Preceded by Harry Lumley	Winner of the Vezina Trophy; 1955	Succeeded by Jacques Plante
Preceded by Charlie Hodge	Winner of the Vezina Trophy with Johnny Bower; 1965	Succeeded by Gump Worsley and Charlie Hodge
