= Jim Henry (ice hockey) =

Canadian ice hockey player

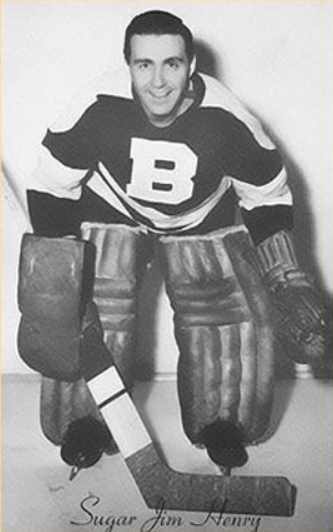
- Henry in the 1950s
- Born: October 23, 1920 Winnipeg, Manitoba, Canada
- Died: January 21, 2004 (aged 83)
- Height: 5 ft 9 in (175 cm)
- Weight: 165 lb (75 kg; 11 st 11 lb)
- Position: Goaltender
- Caught: Left
- Played for: Boston Bruins; Chicago Black Hawks; New York Rangers
- Playing career: 1941–1960

Samuel James "Sugar Jim" Henry (October 23, 1920 – January 21, 2004) was a Canadian professional ice hockey player. A goaltender, Henry played in the National Hockey League (NHL) with the New York Rangers, Chicago Black Hawks and the Boston Bruins between 1941 and 1955.

== Early life ==
Henry was born on October 23, 1920, in Winnipeg, Manitoba, Canada to mother Essie Henry. Growing up, he earned the nickname "Sugar" as the neighbours would dip his pacifier into sugar. During the 1930s, he played for the Brandon Elks in the Manitoba Junior Hockey League and led them to the Turnbull Cup. Following this, Henry joined the Regina Rangers of the Saskatchewan Junior Hockey League where he led them to the 1941 Allen Cup. During the tournament, Henry gained the attention of Frank Boucher of the New York Rangers.

== Playing career ==
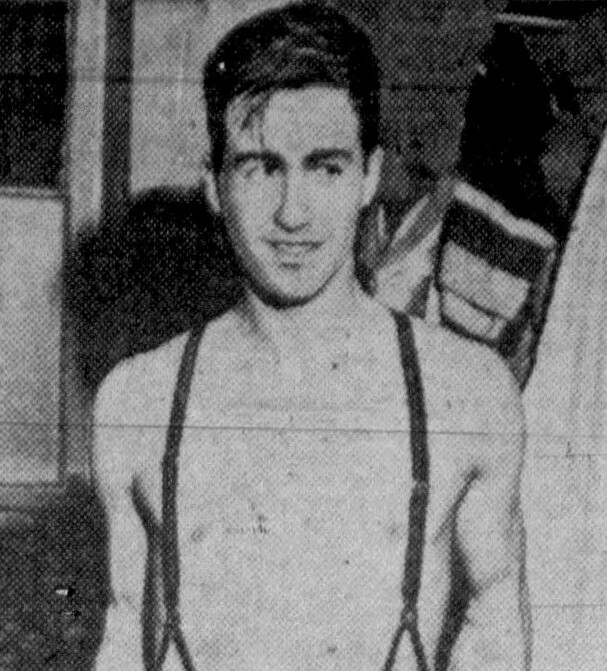
Henry in 1942 photo

Upon winning the 1941 Allen Cup, Henry started his NHL career with the New York Rangers. During his first NHL season, he led the New York Rangers to a first-place but they lost to the Toronto Maple Leafs in the 1942 Stanley Cup Playoffs. Despite this, Henry's 29 wins during the season led all goaltenders around the league and set a new franchise record. Following his rookie season, World War II broke out and he joined the Ottawa Commandos and Red Deer Army. In 1942, while with the Commandos, Henry helped them sweep the competition and win another Allen Cup. He also played with the Red Deer A-16 Army team and was voted the most valuable player in the league. In 1945, Henry was discharged from the army and returned to the National Hockey League.

When the 1945–46 NHL season started, Henry alternated goaltending duties with Chuck Rayner. However, Rayner eventually took over starting duties and Henry was re-assigned to the New Haven Ramblers of the American Hockey League (AHL) in January 1946. Following this, he spent numerous seasons alternating between the NHL and AHL. During the 1947–48 season, Henry returned to his original starting position with the Rangers after Rayner suffered a compound fracture of his right cheekbone. Within his first 25 games as the starting goaltender, Henry earned 12 wins, seven losses, and six ties.

During the 1952 postseason, Henry recorded a playoff shutout in the semifinal round versus Montreal. At the end of Game #7 of that same series, Henry, sporting a black eye, was photographed shaking hands with Maurice Richard who was bandaged and bloodied. It has been considered one of the iconic NHL photographs.

In 2004, Henry was inducted into the Manitoba Sports Hall of Fame.

== Awards and achievements ==
- Turnbull Cup MJHL Championship (1939)
- Allan Cup Championships (1941 & 1943)
- USHL First All-Star Team (1950)
- Charles Gardiner Memorial Trophy Winner (Top Goaltender USHL) (1950)
- NHL Second All-Star Team (1952)
- Played in NHL All-Star Game (1952)
- Honoured Member of the Manitoba Hockey Hall of Fame

== Career statistics ==
=== Regular season and playoffs ===
			Regular season								Playoffs
Season	Team	League	GP	W	L	T	Min	GA	SO	GAA	GP	W	L	T	Min	GA	SO	GAA
1937–38	Winnipeg Lombards	WJrHL	—	—	—	—	—	—	—	—	—	—	—	—	—	—	—	—
1938–39	Brandon Elks	MJHL	15	—	—	—	900	44	1	2.96	7	—	—	—	420	30	0	4.29
1938–39	Brandon Elks	M-Cup	—	—	—	—	—	—	—	—	6	3	3	—	360	26	1	4.33
1939–40	Winnipeg Lombards	MJHL	23	—	—	—	1380	82	0	3.57	—	—	—	—	—	—	—	—
1939–40	Brandon Elks	MJHL	—	—	—	—	—	—	—	—	3	3	0	0	180	6	1	2.00
1940–41	Regina Rangers	SSHL	29	—	—	—	1740	87	2	3.00	8	—	—	—	480	22	1	2.75
1940–41	Regina Rangers	Al-Cup	—	—	—	—	—	—	—	—	14	9	4	1	840	38	2	2.71
1941–42	New York Rangers	NHL	48	29	17	2	2960	143	1	2.90	6	2	4	—	360	13	1	2.17
1942–43	Ottawa Staff Clerks	ONDHL	8	—	—	—	480	53	0	6.63	—	—	—	—	—	—	—	—
1942–43	Ottawa Commandos	QSHL	23	—	—	—	1380	84	1	3.65	—	—	—	—	—	—	—	—
1942–43	Ottawa Commandos	Al-Cup	—	—	—	—	—	—	—	—	12	9	2	1	740	35	2	2.84
1943–44	Red Deer Army	CNDHL	16	—	—	—	960	52	0	3.25	5	—	—	—	300	19	0	3.80
1943–44	Calgary Navy	CNDHL	15	—	—	—	900	92	0	6.13	—	—	—	—	—	—	—	—
1945–46	New York Rangers	NHL	11	1	7	2	623	42	1	4.04	—	—	—	—	—	—	—	—
1945–46	New Haven Ramblers	AHL	25	8	15	2	1500	96	1	3.84	—	—	—	—	—	—	—	—
1946–47	New York Rangers	NHL	2	0	2	0	120	9	0	4.50	—	—	—	—	—	—	—	—
1946–47	New Haven Ramblers	AHL	58	20	28	10	3480	197	5	3.40	3	1	2	—	180	11	0	3.67
1947–48	New York Rangers	NHL	48	17	18	13	2880	153	2	3.19	—	—	—	—	—	—	—	—
1947–48	New Haven Ramblers	AHL	13	6	6	1	780	40	1	3.08
1948–49	Chicago Black Hawks	NHL	60	21	31	8	3600	211	0	3.52	—	—	—	—	—	—	—	—
1949–50	Kansas City Pla-Mors	USHL	68	29	27	12	4080	255	3	3.75	3	0	3	—	180	20	0	6.67
1950–51	Omaha Knights	USHL	7	5	2	0	420	18	1	2.57	—	—	—	—	—	—	—	—
1950–51	Indianapolis Capitals	AHL	58	37	19	2	3520	202	0	3.44	3	0	3	—	190	11	0	3.47
1951–52	Boston Bruins	NHL	70	25	29	16	4200	176	7	2.51	7	3	4	—	448	18	1	2.41
1952–53	Boston Bruins	NHL	70	28	29	13	4200	172	7	2.46	9	5	4	—	510	26	0	3.06
1953–54	Boston Bruins	NHL	70	32	28	10	4200	181	8	2.59	4	0	4	—	240	16	0	4.00
1954–55	Boston Bruins	NHL	27	8	12	6	1572	79	1	3.02	3	1	2	—	183	8	0	2.62
1955–56	Sault Ste. Marie Greyhounds	NOHA	—	—	—	—	—	—	—	—	—	—	—	—	—	—	—	—
1956–57	Winnipeg Maroons	X-Games	—	—	—	—	—	—	—	—	—	—	—	—	—	—	—	—
1957–58	Winnipeg Maroons	X-Games	—	—	—	—	—	—	—	—	—	—	—	—	—	—	—	—
1957–58	Winnipeg Maroons	Al-Cup	—	—	—	—	—	—	—	—	12	10	2	0	720	31	1	2.58
1958–59	Warroad Lakers	MHL-Sr.	14	—	—	—	840	41	0	2.92	—	—	—	—	—	—	—	—
1959–60	St. Paul Saints	IHL	9	—	—	—	540	35	0	3.89	—	—	—	—	—	—	—	—
1959–60	Winnipeg Maroons	Al-Cup	—	—	—	—	—	—	—	—	3	1	2	0	179	6	0	2.01
NHL totals			406	161	173	70	24,355	1166	27	2.87	29	11	18	—	1741	81	2	2.79

== Transactions ==
- October 7, 1948 - Traded to Chicago Black Hawks by New York Rangers for Emile Francis and Alex Kaleta.
- July 13, 1950 - Traded to Detroit Red Wings by Chicago Black Hawks with Metro Prystai, Gaye Stewart and Bob Goldham for Harry Lumley, Jack Stewart, Al Dewsbury, Pete Babando and Don Morrison.
- September 28, 1951 - Traded to Boston Bruins by Detroit Red Wings for cash
