= Don Morrison (ice hockey) =

Canadian ice hockey player

- Born: July 14, 1923; Saskatoon, Saskatchewan, Canada
- Died: January 25, 2001 (aged 77); Mesa, Arizona, U.S.
- Height: 5 ft 10 in (178 cm)
- Weight: 165 lb (75 kg; 11 st 11 lb)
- Position: Centre
- Shot: Right
- Played for: Detroit Red Wings; Chicago Black Hawks
- Playing career: 1945–1952

Donald MacRae Morrison (July 14, 1923 – January 25, 2001) was a Canadian professional ice hockey centre who played 112 games in the National Hockey League with the Detroit Red Wings and Chicago Black Hawks between 1947 and 1951.

== Career statistics ==
=== Regular season and playoffs ===
			Regular season					Playoffs
Season	Team	League	GP	G	A	Pts	PIM	GP	G	A	Pts	PIM
1944–45	Winnipeg RCAF	WNDHL	—	—	—	—	—	—	—	—	—	—
1945–46	Omaha Knights	USHL	36	32	24	56	8	7	2	0	2	4
1946–47	Omaha Knights	USHL	59	32	44	76	11	11	6	12	18	0
1947–48	Detroit Red Wings	NHL	40	10	15	25	6	3	0	1	1	0
1947–48	Indianapolis Capitals	AHL	27	12	16	28	9	—	—	—	—	—
1948–49	Detroit Red Wings	NHL	13	0	1	1	0	—	—	—	—	—
1948–49	Indianapolis Capitals	AHL	48	20	29	49	25	2	0	1	1	0
1949–50	Indianapolis Capitals	AHL	57	21	38	59	14	8	3	4	7	0
1950–51	Chicago Black Hawks	NHL	59	8	12	20	6	—	—	—	—	—
1951–52	St. Louis Flyers	AHL	65	17	43	60	18	—	—	—	—	—
AHL totals			197	70	126	196	66	10	3	5	8	0
NHL totals			112	18	28	46	12	3	0	1	1	0
