= 1950–51 NHL season =

National Hockey League season

- League: National Hockey League
- Sport: Ice hockey
- Duration: October 11, 1950 – April 21, 1951
- Games: 70
- Teams: 6

Regular season
- Season champion: Detroit Red Wings
- Season MVP: Milt Schmidt (Bruins)
- Top scorer: Gordie Howe (Red Wings)

Stanley Cup
- Champions: Toronto Maple Leafs
- Runners-up: Montreal Canadiens

NHL seasons
- ← 1949–50 1951–52 →

The 1950–51 NHL season was the 34th season of the National Hockey League. Six teams played 70 games each. The Toronto Maple Leafs defeated the Montreal Canadiens four games to one for the Stanley Cup to win their fifth Cup in seven years.

== League business ==
The league implemented a rule requiring all teams to provide an emergency goaltender for every game, for use by either team in case of illness or injury.

== Regular season ==
The biggest trade in NHL history at the time took place in July 1950 with Sugar Jim Henry, Gaye Stewart, Bob Goldham and Metro Prystai of Chicago going to Detroit for Harry Lumley, Black Jack Stewart, Al Dewsbury, Don Morrison and Pete Babando, an exchange of nine players altogether.

Joe Primeau was named coach of the Toronto Maple Leafs with Hap Day kicked upstairs to assistant general manager. Toronto came flying out of the gate, undefeated in 11 games. Al Rollins had a great year, finishing with a 1.75 goals against average in 40 games. The Leafs had hoped to have Rollins share the Vezina Trophy with Turk Broda, but the league decided Rollins alone would be the recipient. The Leafs' .679 win percentage remains their all-time best for a season, despite the fact that they were second in the league standings behind Detroit.

With the New York Rangers slumping this season, they hired a hypnotist, Dr. David Tracy, to help relax the team. The treatment remained in doubt and the Rangers lost to Boston November 12. Asked why the treatment didn't work, Dr. Tracy said that he should have worked with the goaltender (Chuck Rayner) as he wasn't relaxed enough.

Montreal fans were excited when it was reported that two junior stars, Jean Beliveau and Bernie Geoffrion, would be given a trial in a December 16 game with the Rangers. The Canadiens played a 1–1 tie before 14,158 fans. Geoffrion scored the Canadiens goal in his debut.

Chicago was in third place at mid-season when bad luck struck. Their captain, Black Jack Stewart, ruptured a disc in his back and had to undergo surgery. He was finished for the season and his career was in jeopardy. Aggravating things were injuries to Gus Bodnar and Bill Gadsby. The Black Hawks won only two games in the second half and finished last.

In March, Rocket Richard ran into trouble in a game with Detroit. Richard was tripped and rose with a cut between the eyes. No penalty was called and Richard commenced an argument with referee Hugh McLean. He continued his argument too long and was given a misconduct penalty. Richard then skated to the penalty box and found Leo Reise of Detroit there to welcome him with derisive remarks which infuriated Richard, who then punched Reise, and when linesman Jim Primeau rushed to intervene, Richard took a poke at him and Richard was given a game misconduct. The Canadiens took a train to New York for a game against the Rangers, and the next morning, Richard encountered referee McLean and linesman Primeau in the lobby of the Picadilly Hotel. No punches were thrown, but Richard grabbed McLean by the tie and then Primeau intervened. Considerable profanity filled the air, but cooler heads separated the trio before fists could fly. NHL President Clarence Campbell took a dim view of the matter and fined the Rocket $500 for conduct prejudicial to the welfare of hockey.

The Detroit Red Wings got hot in the second half, overtaking Toronto and finished in first place again, becoming the first team with more than 100 points. Gordie Howe led the NHL in goals, assists, and points while goaltender Terry Sawchuk won the Calder Memorial Trophy as the league's best rookie. Sawchuk set a record for most wins by a goalie, as he was in net for all 44 Detroit victories.

=== Final standings ===
National Hockey League
		GP	W	L	T	GF	GA	DIFF	Pts
1	Detroit Red Wings	70	44	13	13	236	139	+97	101
2	Toronto Maple Leafs	70	41	16	13	212	138	+74	95
3	Montreal Canadiens	70	25	30	15	173	184	−11	65
4	Boston Bruins	70	22	30	18	178	197	−19	62
5	New York Rangers	70	20	29	21	169	201	−32	61
6	Chicago Black Hawks	70	13	47	10	171	280	−109	36

== Playoffs ==
=== Playoff bracket ===
The top four teams in the league qualified for the playoffs. In the semifinals, the first-place team played the third-place team, while the second-place team faced the fourth-place team, with the winners advancing to the Stanley Cup Finals. In both rounds, teams competed in a best-of-seven series (scores in the bracket indicate the number of games won in each best-of-seven series).

Semifinals
1	Detroit	2
3	Montreal	4
2	Toronto	4
4	Boston	1

Stanley Cup Finals
3	Montreal	1
2	Toronto	4

=== Semifinals ===
==== (1) Detroit Red Wings vs. (3) Montreal Canadiens ====
March 27	Montreal Canadiens	3–2	4OT	Detroit Red Wings	Olympia Stadium	Recap
Butch Bouchard (1) – 13:35		First period		12:15 – Gordie Howe (1)
No scoring		Second period		No scoring
Bert Olmstead (1) – 09:08		Third period		01:10 – Leo Reise (1)
Maurice Richard (1) – 01:09		Fourth overtime period		No scoring
Gerry McNeil		Goalie stats		Terry Sawchuck

March 29	Montreal Canadiens	1–0	3OT	Detroit Red Wings	Olympia Stadium	Recap
No scoring		First period		No scoring
No scoring		Second period		No scoring
No scoring		Third period		No scoring
Maurice Richard (2) – 02:20		Third overtime period		No scoring
Gerry McNeil		Goalie stats		Terry Sawchuck

March 31	Detroit Red Wings	2–0	Montreal Canadiens	Montreal Forum	Recap
No scoring		First period	No scoring
Gordie Howe (2) – 16:23		Second period	No scoring
Sid Abel (1) – 13:45		Third period	No scoring
Terry Sawchuck		Goalie stats	Gerry McNeil

April 3	Detroit Red Wings	4–1	Montreal Canadiens	Montreal Forum	Recap
Leo Reise (2) – 08:40; Metro Prystai (1) – 10:10		First period	No scoring
No scoring		Second period	14:28 – pp – Elmer Lach (1)
Gerry Couture (1) – 10:26; Sid Abel (2) – 13:14		Third period	No scoring
Terry Sawchuck		Goalie stats	Gerry McNeil

April 5	Montreal Canadiens	5–2	Detroit Red Wings	Olympia Stadium	Recap
No scoring		First period	01:09 – Sid Abel (3); 14:27 – Gordie Howe (3)
Billy Reay (1) – sh – 04:04; Bert Olmstead (2) – pp – 11:48; Bernie Geoffrion (1) – 17:51		Second period	No scoring
Maurice Richard (3) – 14:45; Calum MacKay (1) – 18:07		Third period	No scoring
Gerry McNeil		Goalie stats	Terry Sawchuck

April 7	Detroit Red Wings	2–3	Montreal Canadiens	Montreal Forum	Recap
No scoring		First period	No scoring
No scoring		Second period	No scoring
Sid Abel (4) – 07:31; Gordie Howe (4) – 19:15		Third period	06:49 – Billy Reay (2); 09:39 – Maurice Richard (4); 15:45 – Ken Mosdell (1)
Terry Sawchuck		Goalie stats	Gerry McNeil

Montreal won series 4–2

==== (2) Toronto Maple Leafs vs. (4) Boston Bruins ====
Game two was the last Stanley Cup playoff overtime game to end in a tie. The game was played on a Saturday night and as game crept closer to midnight it had to be stopped due to city bylaws and the federal Lord's Day Act that were in effect at the time in Toronto. These laws prevented businesses from operating on Sunday. Despite the second game ending in a tie, Boston set an NHL record for fewest goals scored in a six-game series, with a total of five.

March 28	Boston Bruins	2–0	Toronto Maple Leafs	Maple Leaf Gardens	Recap
Lorne Ferguson (1) – 15:58		First period	No scoring
No scoring		Second period	No scoring
Woody Dumart (1) – 01:12		Third period	No scoring
Jack Gelineau		Goalie stats	Al Rollins, Turk Broda

March 31	Boston Bruins	1–1	OT	Toronto Maple Leafs	Maple Leaf Gardens	Recap
No scoring		First period		03:47 – Bill Barilko (1)
Johnny Peirson (1) – 09:26		Second period		No scoring
No scoring		Third period		No scoring
No scoring		First overtime period		No scoring
Jack Gelineau		Goalie stats		Turk Broda

April 1	Toronto Maple Leafs	3–0	Boston Bruins	Boston Garden	Recap
No scoring		First period	No scoring
Cal Gardner (1) – 03:02; Fern Flaman (1) – pp – 13:11		Second period	No scoring
Max Bentley (1) – 05:30		Third period	No scoring
Turk Broda		Goalie stats	Jack Gelineau

April 3	Toronto Maple Leafs	3–1	Boston Bruins	Boston Garden	Recap
No scoring		First period	07:50 – Dunc Fisher (1)
Sid Smith (1) – pp – 12:17; Max Bentley (2) – 14:33		Second period	No scoring
Bill Barilko (2) – 14:08		Third period	No scoring
Turk Broda		Goalie stats	Jack Gelineau

April 7	Boston Bruins	1–4	Toronto Maple Leafs	Maple Leaf Gardens	Recap
No scoring		First period	19:38 – sh – Joe Klukay (1)
No scoring		Second period	11:12 – Fleming MacKell (1)
Bill Ezinicki (1) – 09:53		Third period	04:46 – Joe Klukay (2); 09:15 – Ted Kennedy (1)
Gord Henry		Goalie stats	Turk Broda

April 8	Toronto Maple Leafs	6–0	Boston Bruins	Boston Garden	Recap
Ted Kennedy (2) – 10:16; Joe Klukay (3) – 14:36		First period	No scoring
Fleming MacKell (2) – 12:42		Second period	No scoring
Sid Smith (2) – 06:42; Tod Sloan (1) – 09:42; Joe Klukay (4) – 15:01		Third period	No scoring
Turk Broda		Goalie stats	Gord Henry

Toronto won series 4–1

=== Stanley Cup Finals ===
April 11	Montreal Canadiens	2–3	OT	Toronto Maple Leafs	Maple Leaf Gardens	Recap
Maurice Richard (5) – 15:27		First period		00:15 – Sid Smith (3); 15:42 – Tod Sloan (2)
Paul Masnick (1) – 04:02		Second period		No scoring
No scoring		Third period		No scoring
No scoring		First overtime period		05:51 – Sid Smith (4)
Gerry McNeil		Goalie stats		Turk Broda

April 14	Montreal Canadiens	3–2	OT	Toronto Maple Leafs	Maple Leaf Gardens	Recap
Paul Masnick (2) – 03:44		First period		No scoring
Billy Reay (3) – 09:24		Second period		16:31 – pp – Sid Smith (5)
No scoring		Third period		08:16 – pp – Ted Kennedy (3)
Maurice Richard (6) – 02:55		First overtime period		No scoring
Gerry McNeil		Goalie stats		Turk Broda

April 17	Toronto Maple Leafs	2–1	OT	Montreal Canadiens	Montreal Forum	Recap
No scoring		First period		02:18 – pp – Maurice Richard (7)
Sid Smith (6) – pp – 05:58		Second period		No scoring
No scoring		Third period		No scoring
Ted Kennedy (4) – 04:47		First overtime period		No scoring
Al Rollins		Goalie stats		Gerry McNeil

April 19	Toronto Maple Leafs	3–2	OT	Montreal Canadiens	Montreal Forum	Recap
Sid Smith (7) – 00:38		First period		14:41 – Maurice Richard (8)
Howie Meeker (1) – 01:27		Second period		No scoring
No scoring		Third period		13:49 – Elmer Lach (2)
Harry Watson (1) – 05:15		First overtime period		No scoring
Al Rollins		Goalie stats		Gerry McNeil

April 21	Montreal Canadiens	2–3	OT	Toronto Maple Leafs	Maple Leaf Gardens	Recap
No scoring		First period		No scoring
Maurice Richard (9) – 08:56		Second period		12:00 – Tod Sloan (3)
Paul Meger (1) – 04:47		Third period		19:28 – Tod Sloan (4)
No scoring		First overtime period		02:53 – Bill Barilko (3)
Gerry McNeil		Goalie stats		Al Rollins

Toronto won series 4–1

== Awards ==
Award winners
Prince of Wales Trophy: (Regular season champion)	Detroit Red Wings
Art Ross Trophy: (Top scorer)	Gordie Howe, Detroit Red Wings
Calder Memorial Trophy: (Best first-year player)	Terry Sawchuk, Detroit Red Wings
Hart Trophy: (Most valuable player)	Milt Schmidt, Boston Bruins
Lady Byng Memorial Trophy: (Excellence and sportsmanship)	Red Kelly, Detroit Red Wings
Vezina Trophy: (Goaltender of team with best goals-against record)	Al Rollins, Toronto Maple Leafs

All-Star teams
First team	Position	Second team
Terry Sawchuk, Detroit Red Wings	G	Chuck Rayner, New York Rangers
Red Kelly, Detroit Red Wings	D	Jimmy Thomson, Toronto Maple Leafs
Bill Quackenbush, Boston Bruins	D	Leo Reise Jr., Detroit Red Wings
Milt Schmidt, Boston Bruins	C	Ted Kennedy, Toronto Maple Leafs Sid Abel, Detroit Red Wings (tied)
Gordie Howe, Detroit Red Wings	RW	Maurice Richard, Montreal Canadiens
Ted Lindsay, Detroit Red Wings	LW	Sid Smith, Toronto Maple Leafs

== Player statistics ==
=== Scoring leaders ===
Note: GP = Games played; G = Goals; A = Assists; Pts = Points

Player	Team	GP	G	A	Pts
Gordie Howe	Detroit Red Wings	70	43	43	86
Maurice Richard	Montreal Canadiens	65	42	24	66
Max Bentley	Toronto Maple Leafs	67	21	41	62
Sid Abel	Detroit Red Wings	69	23	38	61
Milt Schmidt	Boston Bruins	62	22	39	61
Ted Kennedy	Toronto Maple Leafs	63	18	43	61
Ted Lindsay	Detroit Red Wings	67	24	35	59
Tod Sloan	Toronto Maple Leafs	70	31	25	56
Red Kelly	Detroit Red Wings	70	17	37	54
Sid Smith	Toronto Maple Leafs	70	30	21	51

Source: NHL

=== Leading goaltenders ===
Note: GP = Games played; Min = Minutes played; GA = Goals against; GAA = Goals against average; W = Wins; L = Losses; T = Ties; SO = Shutouts

Player	Team	GP	MIN	GA	GAA	W	L	T	SO
Al Rollins	Toronto Maple Leafs	40	2373	70	1.77	27	5	8	5
Terry Sawchuk	Detroit Red Wings	70	4200	139	1.99	44	13	13	11
Turk Broda	Toronto Maple Leafs	31	1827	68	2.23	14	11	5	6
Gerry McNeil	Montreal Canadiens	70	4200	184	2.63	25	30	15	6
Jack Gelineau	Boston Bruins	70	4200	197	2.81	22	30	18	4
Chuck Rayner	New York Rangers	66	3940	187	2.85	19	28	19	2
Emile Francis	New York Rangers	5	260	14	3.23	1	1	2	0
Harry Lumley	Chicago Black Hawks	64	3785	246	3.90	12	41	10	3
Marcel Pelletier	Chicago Black Hawks	6	355	29	4.90	1	5	0	0

== Coaches ==
- Boston Bruins: Lynn Patrick
- Chicago Black Hawks: Ebbie Goodfellow
- Detroit Red Wings: Tommy Ivan
- Montreal Canadiens: Dick Irvin
- New York Rangers: Neil Colville
- Toronto Maple Leafs: Joe Primeau

== Debuts ==
The following is a list of players of note who played their first NHL game in 1950–51 (listed with their first team, asterisk(*) marks debut in playoffs):

- Alex Delvecchio, Detroit Red Wings
- Bernie Geoffrion, Montreal Canadiens
- Jean Beliveau, Montreal Canadiens
- Dollard St. Laurent, Montreal Canadiens
- Danny Lewicki, Toronto Maple Leafs

== Last games ==
The following is a list of players of note that played their last game in the NHL in 1950–51 (listed with their last team):

- Joe Carveth, Detroit Red Wings
- Glen Harmon, Montreal Canadiens
- Wally Stanowski, New York Rangers
- Pat Egan, New York Rangers (last active New York American)
- Buddy O'Connor, New York Rangers
- Bill Barilko, Toronto Maple Leafs
- Johnny Peirson, Boston Bruins

== See also ==
- 1950–51 NHL transactions
- List of Stanley Cup champions
- 4th National Hockey League All-Star Game
- National Hockey League All-Star Game
- 1950 in sports
- 1951 in sports
