= Hap Emms =

Canadian ice hockey player and coach (1905–1988)

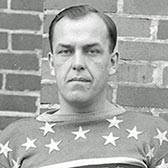
- Born: January 12, 1905 Barrie, Ontario, Canada
- Died: October 23, 1988 (aged 83) Niagara Falls, Ontario, Canada
- Height: 6 ft 0 in (183 cm)
- Weight: 190 lb (86 kg; 13 st 8 lb)
- Position: Left wing/Defence
- Shot: Left
- Played for: Montreal Maroons; New York Americans; Detroit Falcons; Detroit Red Wings; Boston Bruins
- Playing career: 1926–1938

Leighton Alfred Emms (January 12, 1905 – October 23, 1988) was a Canadian ice hockey player, coach, team owner, and general manager, during nearly 60 years in hockey. Emms played 17 seasons of professional hockey as a left winger and a defenceman, including 10 seasons and 320 games in the National Hockey League. After playing, Emms had a 33-year presence in the Ontario Hockey Association, as the owner of the Barrie Flyers, Niagara Falls Flyers, and St. Catharines Black Hawks between 1945 and 1978. Teams that Emms coached or owned appeared in eight Memorial Cup tournaments, winning four Memorial Cups. He was nicknamed "Happy Emms" due to the sour look on his face, which was later shortened to "Hap Emms".

== Playing career ==
Emms started his career as a left winger playing junior ice hockey from 1921 to 1925. He signed as a free agent with the Montreal Maroons on November 10, 1926. He spent the next two seasons splitting time between the Maroons and the Stratford Nationals of the Canadian Professional Hockey League. Emms then moved to the Windsor Bulldogs in the International Hockey League, for two seasons, and scored 21 goals both seasons.

Emms was traded to New York Americans on May 14, 1930. In 1930–31, Emms played his first full NHL season at the age of 25, in 44 games with the New York Americans. He started the 1931–32 season with Americans, was traded to the Detroit Falcons on December 29, 1931, then played briefly with New Haven Eagles in the Canadian–American Hockey League, before being called back up to the NHL. He played three seasons in Detroit, but was not happy, and asked Jack Adams to release him.

Emms signed as a free agent by Boston Bruins on, October 28, 1934, and switched to playing defence. He played only 11 games with the Bruins, and was traded to New York Americans on December 14, 1934. He played three more seasons in New York, and was traded to Detroit on February 13, 1938, ending his NHL career. Emms played on Detroit's farm team, the Pittsburgh Hornets in the IAHL for two seasons.

== Player-coach ==
Emms joined the Omaha Knights in the American Hockey Association, as a player-coach. Emms scored 19 goals in the 1939–40 season, and led his team to the AHA finals. Emms broke his leg part way through the 1941–42 season. He remained on the team as coach, and led the Knights to the AHA championship. After a couple years off from hockey, Emms returned to coach the St. Louis Flyers of the American Hockey League in the 1944–45 season, and played the final two games of his career. Six games into the 1945–46 season, Emms left St. Louis to return home.

== Barrie Flyers ==
Emms founded the Barrie Flyers in his hometown of Barrie, in the Ontario Hockey Association. From 1945 to 1960, Emms was head coach and owner of the Flyers, and the team was sponsored by the Boston Bruins. Barrie won its first J. Ross Robertson Cup in the third season of play, defeating the original Windsor Spitfires in the finals. In the Eastern Canada finals, the Flyers won the George Richardson Memorial Trophy versus the Montreal Nationales. The Flyers played in the 1948 Memorial Cup, losing to the Port Arthur West End Bruins. Barrie repeated as OHA champions the following season, defeating the Toronto Marlboros for the J. Ross Robertson Cup. In the Eastern Canada finals, Barrie lost to the Montreal Royals. Emms rebuilt the team in 1950, and then finished first place in the OHA in 1951. The Flyers returned to the OHA finals, beating the Toronto Marlboros. The Flyers won the Eastern Canada title versus the Quebec Citadels, and won the 1951 Memorial Cup versus the Winnipeg Monarchs.

The Flyers finished first place in the OHA in 1953. Emms was involved in controversy during the OHA playoffs in 1953, when he refused to play a Sunday playoff game for religious reasons, and when he had a goal judge handcuffed and removed from Barrie Arena. Despite the incidents, Emms' Flyers won its fourth J. Ross Robertson Cup in 1953, defeating the Toronto St. Michael's Majors, and then won its third George Richardson Memorial Trophy as Eastern Canada champions versus the Quebec Citadels. Barrie won its second national title, defeating the St. Boniface Canadiens in the 1953 Memorial Cup. Emms next seven seasons were not as successful, but his team did reach the 1956 OHA finals.

Some notable players Emms coached on the Barrie Flyers included brothers Dick Cherry and Don Cherry, Real Chevrefils, Marv Edwards, Ray Gariepy, Howie Glover, Leo Labine, Wayne Maxner, Gilles Mayer, Don McKenney, Paul Meger, Doug Mohns, Jim Morrison, Ron Stewart, Orval Tessier, Jerry Toppazzini, and Ed Westfall.

== Niagara Falls Flyers ==
Emms moved the Flyers from Barrie, and operated the franchise from Niagara Falls, Ontario from 1960 to 1972. Emms slowly relinquished coaching duties to others, but continued as team owner, and general manager. The Niagara Falls Flyers were still sponsored by the Bruins until the direct NHL sponsorship of junior clubs halted in 1967. In the Flyers third season, the team finished first place in the OHA, winning the Hamilton Spectator Trophy with 69 points. Niagara Falls defeated the Toronto Neil McNeil Maroons in the OHA finals to win its first J. Ross Robertson Cup in its new city, and the fifth for Emms. The Flyers defeated the Espanola Eagles in the Eastern Canada finals, to advance to the 1963 Memorial Cup played in Edmonton, but lost to the Edmonton Oil Kings in six games. Two seasons later, Emms led the Flyers to another first-place finish with 81 points, and a second Hamilton Spectator Trophy. Niagara Falls defeated the Toronto Marlboros in the OHA finals, and advanced to a rematch with the Edmonton Oil Kings in the 1965 Memorial Cup, also played in Edmonton. Emms won his third Memorial Cup as his Flyers prevailed in five games.

Three season later, Emms had another championship team. The Flyers finished fourth place in the OHA, but marched through the playoffs to win the J. Ross Robertson Cup versus the Kitchener Rangers, the seventh for Emms. Niagara won the Eastern Canada final versus the Verdun Maple Leafs. Four of the five games in the 1968 Memorial Cup were played at Emms' home rink, the Niagara Falls Memorial Arena. The Flyers won all four games on home ice for their second Memorial Cup title, and the fourth for Emms. After 1968, many of the players graduated to higher leagues, and the Flyers struggled for the next four seasons, missing the playoffs twice, and winning only one playoff series. In 1972, Emms sold the Flyers, and the team was relocated to become the Sudbury Wolves.

Notable Niagara Falls Flyers players are: Don Awrey, Jim Lorentz, Rick Ley, Don Marcotte, Barry Wilkins, Rosaire Paiement, Steve Atkinson, Bill Goldsworthy, Jean Pronovost, John Arbour, Gilles Marotte, Bernie Parent, Doug Favell, Derek Sanderson, Brad Selwood, Phil Roberto, Tom Webster, and Phil Myre.

== Boston Bruins ==
During the 1965–66 and 1966–67 seasons Emms was the general manager of both the NHL Bruins, and the Niagara Falls Flyers. Emms succeeded Lynn Patrick as only the third GM in the Bruins' 41-year history to that point. Emms brought in such players as Bernie Parent, Pit Martin, John "Pie" McKenzie, Gerry Cheevers, Gilles Marotte and Gary Doak to the Bruins. He also promoted Harry Sinden to coach in 1966, and was the general manager during Bobby Orr's first season in the National Hockey League. The Bruins were in the midst of an eight-year slump, and failed to make the playoffs during Emms' two seasons. Emms and the Bruins mutually ended his management, and he returned to the Niagara Fall Flyers. Emms was replaced by his assistant, Milt Schmidt.

== St. Catharines Blackhawks ==
Emms purchased the St. Catharines Black Hawks immediately after selling the Flyers in 1972. In his first season with the new club, Emms was suspended by the league for an incident involving the Toronto Marlboros' Mark Napier, who had signed a professional contract to play for the Toronto Toros. The World Hockey Association contract was not to take effect until after Napier's junior season was complete, but Emms felt it was wrong to have what he deemed a professional playing in junior hockey. During a game against Toronto, Emms ordered his players to wear their jerseys backwards and play with their sticks upside down in protest. The Toronto Marlboros won 14–0, Emms was fined $1,000, and suspended for one year by league commissioner Tubby Schmalz.

By the 1973–74 season, Emms had built the Black Hawks into a championship team. They finished second place in the regular season, then went undefeated in all three OHA playoff rounds to capture the J. Ross Robertson Cup versus the Peterborough Petes. It was Emms' eighth and final OHA title as a general manager. In the 1974 Memorial Cup played in Calgary at the Stampede Corral, the Black Hawks faced the Regina Pats, and the Quebec Remparts. Emm's team won its first game 4–1 over Quebec, then lost to Regina 4–0. In the semifinal game, St. Catharines was defeated 11–3 by Quebec. He led the Black Hawks for two more seasons in St. Catharines, missing the playoffs both times. Emms' time in St. Catharines produced several NHL players including, Wilf Paiement, Gary McAdam, Rick Hampton, Ken Breitenbach, Garry Lariviere, Rick Adduono, and Dave Gorman.

Emms relocated the team to Niagara Falls at the end of the 1975–76 season, becoming the second incarnation of the Niagara Falls Flyers. In his last two seasons, his team missed the playoffs twice, but developed future Hall of Famer Mike Gartner. In his final draft as a general manager in 1977, Emms had the opportunity to draft Wayne Gretzky with the second overall pick, but chose Steve Peters instead. Emms sold the Flyers to Reg Quinn in 1978, and retired from hockey.

== Personal life ==
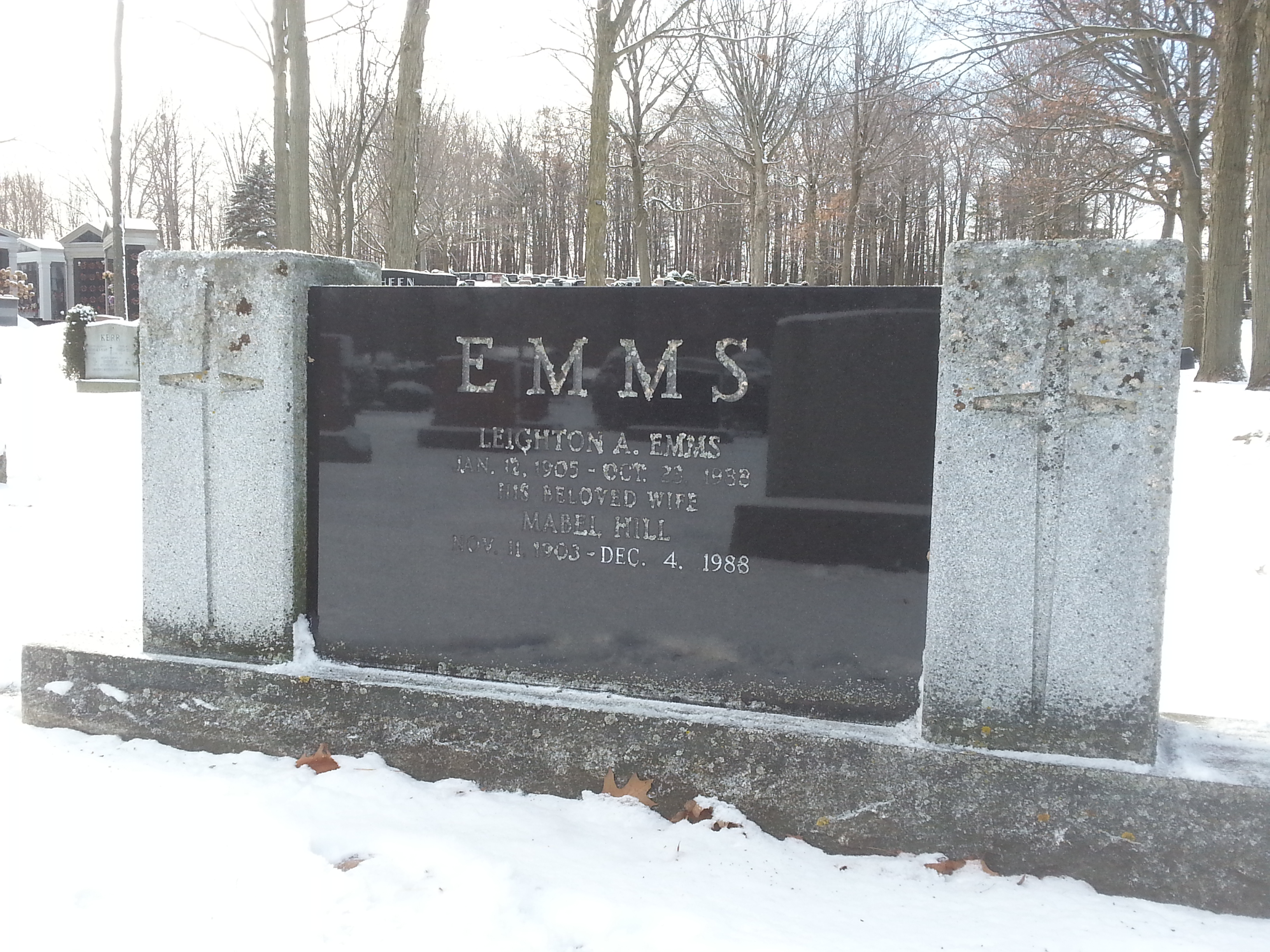
Gravestone of Hap Emms in the Barrie Union Cemetery

Emms coached his son Paul Emms, and nephew Don Emms on the Barrie Flyers. Paul Emms later coached the Niagara Falls Flyers while his father managed. Emms was known for smoking a pipe, being frugal with money, and fined players for cursing. He suffered a stroke in 1983, which left him unable to walk or talk. He died of heart failure on October 22, 1988, in Niagara Falls. Emms was interred at Barrie Union Cemetery.

== Awards and legacy ==
Emms received the Ontario Hockey Association Gold Stick Award in 1955. The Emms Family Award was donated in 1973 by Emms, as an annual award to recognize the OHL Rookie of the Year. The Hap Emms Memorial Trophy was created in 1975, to recognize the outstanding goaltender at the Memorial Cup tournament. From the 1975–76 OMJHL season until the 1993–94 OHL season, the more westerly of the league's two divisions was named the Emms Division in his memory. Likewise, the Emms Trophy for winning the same division, was created at the same time. Since the 1994–95 OHL season, it is awarded to the team winning the central division.

== Career statistics ==
=== Regular season and playoffs ===
			Regular season					Playoffs
Season	Team	League	GP	G	A	Pts	PIM	GP	G	A	Pts	PIM
1921–22	Barrie Colts	OHA-Jr.	—	—	—	—	—	—	—	—	—	—
1922–23	Barrie Colts	OHA-Jr.	—	—	—	—	—	—	—	—	—	—
1923–24	Barrie Colts	OHA-Jr.	—	—	—	—	—	—	—	—	—	—
1924–25	Midland Hockey Club	OHA-Jr.	—	—	—	—	—	—	—	—	—	—
1925–26	Brantford Seniors	OHA-Sr.	—	—	—	—	—	—	—	—	—	—
1926–27	Montreal Maroons	NHL	8	0	0	0	0	—	—	—	—	—
1926–27	Stratford Nationals	Can-Pro	25	10	5	15	59	2	0	0	0	2
1927–28	Montreal Maroons	NHL	10	0	1	1	10	—	—	—	—	—
1927–28	Stratford Nationals	Can-Pro	29	8	5	13	56	5	1	0	1	20
1928–29	Windsor Bulldogs	Can-Pro	42	21	5	26	104	8	6	3	9	30
1929–30	Windsor Bulldogs	IHL	38	21	16	37	107	—	—	—	—	—
1930–31	New York Americans	NHL	44	5	4	9	56	—	—	—	—	—
1931–32	New York Americans	NHL	13	1	0	1	11	—	—	—	—	—
1931–32	New Haven Eagles	Can-Am	5	0	0	0	8	—	—	—	—	—
1931–32	Detroit Falcons	NHL	20	5	9	14	27	2	0	0	0	2
1932–33	Detroit Red Wings	NHL	43	9	13	22	63	4	0	0	0	8
1933–34	Detroit Red Wings	NHL	45	7	7	14	51	8	0	0	0	2
1934–35	Boston Bruins	NHL	11	1	1	2	8	—	—	—	—	—
1934–35	New York Americans	NHL	28	2	2	4	19	—	—	—	—	—
1935–36	New York Americans	NHL	32	1	5	6	12	—	—	—	—	—
1936–37	New York Americans	NHL	46	4	8	12	48	—	—	—	—	—
1937–38	New York Americans	NHL	20	1	3	4	6	—	—	—	—	—
1937–38	Pittsburgh Hornets	IAHL	26	5	13	18	39	2	1	1	2	0
1938–39	Pittsburgh Hornets	IAHL	55	9	26	35	62	—	—	—	—	—
1939–40	Omaha Knights	AHA	48	18	15	33	93	9	0	4	4	0
1940–41	Omaha Knights	AHA	27	7	11	18	31	—	—	—	—	—
1941–42	Omaha Knights	AHA	26	2	5	7	40	—	—	—	—	—
1944–45	St. Louis Flyers	AHL	2	0	0	0	0	—	—	—	—	—
NHL totals			320	36	53	89	311	14	0	0	0	12

== Coaching statistics ==
Season	Team	League	Regular season						Playoffs
Season	Team	League	G	W	L	T	Pts	Finish	Result
1939–40	Omaha Knights	AHA	48	25	23	0	50	4th, AHA	Lost in AHA finals
1940–41	Omaha Knights	AHA	48	24	24	0	48	5th, AHA	Out of playoffs
1941–42	Omaha Knights	AHA	50	24	20	6	54	3rd, North	AHA champions
1944–45	St. Louis Flyers	AHL	60	14	38	8	36	4th, Western	Out of playoffs
1945–46	St. Louis Flyers	AHL	5	1	4	0	2	(4th, Western)	(resigned)
1945–46	Barrie Flyers	OHA	28	8	18	2	18	7th, OHA	—
1946–47	Barrie Flyers	OHA	35	17	16	2	36	6th, OHA	—
1947–48	Barrie Flyers	OHA	36	23	13	0	46	3rd, OHA	OHA champions Lost Memorial Cup finals
1948–49	Barrie Flyers	OHA	48	28	16	4	60	2nd, OHA	OHA champions Lost Eastern Canada final
1949–50	Barrie Flyers	OHA	48	21	24	3	45	5th, OHA	—
1950–51	Barrie Flyers	OHA	54	38	14	2	78	1st, OHA	OHA champions Memorial Cup champions
1951–52	Barrie Flyers	OHA	53	22	30	1	47	7th, OHA	—
1952–53	Barrie Flyers	OHA	56	37	17	2	76	1st, OHA	OHA champions Memorial Cup champions
1953–54	Barrie Flyers	OHA	59	25	33	1	51	7th, OHA	—
1954–55	Barrie Flyers	OHA	49	18	31	0	36	7th, OHA	—
1955–56	Barrie Flyers	OHA	48	20	25	3	43	6th, OHA	Lost in OHA finals
1956–57	Barrie Flyers	OHA	52	13	37	2	28	6th, OHA	—
1957–58	Barrie Flyers	OHA	51	18	29	4	40	6th, OHA	—
1958–59	Barrie Flyers	OHA	54	21	27	6	48	5th, OHA	—
1959–60	Barrie Flyers	OHA	48	24	18	6	54	3rd, OHA	—
TOTALS		AHA	146	73	67	6	152	—	1 AHA championship
TOTALS		AHL	65	15	42	8	38	—	—
TOTALS		OHA	719	333	348	38	704	2 x 1st place	4 OHA championships 1 OHA finalist

Preceded by Lynn Patrick	General Manager of the Boston Bruins; 1965–67	Succeeded by Milt Schmidt
