= Toppazzini =

Toppazzini is an Italian surname. Notable people with the surname include:

- Jerry Toppazzini (1931–2012), Canadian ice hockey player
- Zellio Toppazzini (1930–2001), Canadian ice hockey player
