= Stan Long =

Canadian ice hockey player (1929–1982)

- Born: November 6, 1929 Owen Sound, Ontario, Canada
- Died: January 10, 1982 (aged 52) Strathroy, Ontario, Canada
- Height: 5 ft 11 in (180 cm)
- Weight: 190 lb (86 kg; 13 st 8 lb)
- Position: Defence
- Shot: Left
- Played for: Montreal Canadiens
- Playing career: 1950–1954

Stanley Gordon Long (November 6, 1929 – January 10, 1982) was a Canadian ice hockey defenceman. He played three playoff games in the National Hockey League for the Montreal Canadiens during the 1951–52 season. The rest of his career, which lasted from 1950 to 1954, was spent in the minor leagues.

== Career statistics ==
=== Regular season and playoffs ===
			Regular season					Playoffs
Season	Team	League	GP	G	A	Pts	PIM	GP	G	A	Pts	PIM
1946–47	Barrie Flyers	OHA	14	1	1	2	29	5	0	1	1	4
1947–48	Barrie Flyers	OHA	34	9	25	34	60	13	8	8	16	38
1947–48	Barrie Flyers	M-Cup	—	—	—	—	—	10	3	7	10	18
1948–49	Barrie Flyers	OHA	42	11	39	50	89	8	2	9	11	11
1948–49	Barrie Flyers	M-Cup	—	—	—	—	—	8	2	3	5	6
1949–50	Barrie Flyers	OHA	48	19	37	56	112	9	1	8	9	12
1949–50	Buffalo Bisons	AHL	1	0	0	0	0	—	—	—	—	—
1950–51	Vancouver Canucks	PCHL	62	9	15	24	77	12	2	4	6	16
1950–51	Montreal Royals	QSHL	5	0	0	0	9	—	—	—	—	—
1951–52	Buffalo Bisons	AHL	61	11	20	31	96	3	2	1	3	2
1951–52	Montreal Canadiens	NHL	—	—	—	—	—	3	0	0	0	0
1952–53	Vancouver Canucks	WHL	51	9	19	28	55	—	—	—	—	—
1953–54	Buffalo Bisons	AHL	6	0	4	4	10	—	—	—	—	—
AHL totals			68	11	24	35	106	3	2	1	3	2
NHL totals			—	—	—	—	—	3	0	0	0	0

== Bibliography ==
- "Injured Cougar Defenseman Stan Long "In Serious Condition"". Victoria Times. 26 February 1953.
- "Stan Long in Critical Condition". Calgary Herald. 26 February 1953.
