= Gerry Reid (ice hockey) =

Canadian ice hockey player

- Born: November 18, 1928; Owen Sound, Ontario, Canada
- Died: March 26, 1971 (aged 42); Owen Sound, Ontario, Canada
- Height: 6 ft 1 in (185 cm)
- Weight: 180 lb (82 kg; 12 st 12 lb)
- Position: Centre
- Shot: Right
- Played for: Detroit Red Wings
- Playing career: 1946–1957

Gerald Roland Reid (November 18, 1928 – March 26, 1971) was a Canadian professional ice hockey player who played two games in the National Hockey League with the Detroit Red Wings during the 1949 playoffs. The rest of his career, which lasted from 1946 to 1957, was spent in the minor leagues.

He died in 1971, aged 42. He was buried at Greenwood Cemetery in Owen Sound.

== Career statistics ==
=== Regular season and playoffs ===
			Regular season					Playoffs
Season	Team	League	GP	G	A	Pts	PIM	GP	G	A	Pts	PIM
1946–47	Owen Sound Mohawks	OHA Sr	12	6	8	14	0	6	4	4	8	0
1947–48	Barrie Flyers	OHA	36	28	34	62	10	13	10	9	19	10
1947–48	Barrie Flyers	M-Cup	—	—	—	—	—	8	11	5	16	4
1948–49	Indianapolis Capitals	AHL	68	31	47	78	18	2	0	0	0	2
1948–49	Detroit Red Wings	NHL	—	—	—	—	—	2	0	0	0	2
1949–50	Indianapolis Capitals	AHL	62	28	31	59	10	8	3	6	9	2
1950–51	Indianapolis Capitals	AHL	69	17	51	68	4	3	1	0	1	2
1951–52	Cleveland Barons	AHL	52	15	22	37	9	5	0	0	0	0
1952–53	Owen Sound Mercurys	OHA Sr	21	15	20	35	4	11	7	3	10	0
1953–54	Owen Sound Mercurys	OHA Sr	48	37	34	71	8	7	6	9	15	2
1953–54	Owen Sound Mercurys	Al-Cup	—	—	—	—	—	7	1	2	3	2
1954–55	Owen Sound Mercurys	OHA Sr	50	24	33	57	10	5	2	3	5	0
1955–56	Owen Sound Mercurys	OHA Sr	48	23	20	43	10	6	0	1	1	2
1956–57	Owen Sound Mercurys	OHA Sr	52	20	29	49	10	—	—	—	—	—
AHL totals			251	91	151	242	41	18	4	6	10	6
OHA Sr totals			231	125	144	269	42	35	19	20	39	4
NHL totals			—	—	—	—	—	2	0	0	0	2
