= Ray Gariepy =

Canadian ice hockey player

- Born: September 4, 1928; Toronto, Ontario, Canada
- Died: March 16, 2012 (aged 83); Barrie, Ontario, Canada
- Height: 5 ft 9 in (175 cm)
- Weight: 180 lb (82 kg; 12 st 12 lb)
- Position: Defence
- Shot: Left
- Played for: Boston Bruins; Toronto Maple Leafs
- Playing career: 1948–1958; 1966–1971

Raymond Joseph "Rockabye Ray" Gariepy (September 4, 1928 – March 16, 2012) was a Canadian professional ice hockey hard-hitting defenceman, who played 36 games in the National Hockey League between 1953 and 1956 for the Boston Bruins and Toronto Maple Leafs.

== Playing career ==
He was raised from an early age in Timmins Ontario, where he first put skate to ice at the age of 14. He was scouted by Hap Emms of the Barrie Flyers, of the OHA Jr. A (from 1945 to 1948), of which Ray was Captain for all 3 years. After Jr. A., Ray played with the Buffalo Bisons AHL, Houston Huskies & Louisville Blades USHL,(1948–49) and Hershey Bears (1950–53) of the AHL. In 1954–55 Ray played for the Pittsburgh Hornets that won the AHL Championship's top prize; The Calder Cup. He finished his professional career with the Toronto Maple Leafs of the National Hockey League in the 1955–56 season after playing one game.

Gariepy's lone NHL goal occurred on January 21, 1954, in Boston's 3–2 win over the Blackhawks at Chicago Stadium.

In September 1956, Gariepy retired from the professional ranks. Now in possession of his amateur card, he played in the Canadian Senior ice hockey league, as well as other senior amateur ice hockey leagues in central Ontario in the coming years. Starting in 1956–57, he played with the Owen Sound Mercurys of the Canadian Senior ice hockey league. In the remaining years, Ray played as either a player, a player/coach, or coach, until his final season in the 1970–71 campaign as coach of the OHA Sr. A Barrie Flyers. He was selected as an All-Star in both of his 1961 and 1966 seasons. All in all, from his Junior A. hockey days with the Barrie Flyers in 1945 to his final season coaching the OHA Senior A Barrie Flyers in 1971, it was an impressive 25-year career in professional and amateur ice hockey. He returned for a season in 1975 to coach the Barrie Juvenile Co-op Midgets of the Barrie Minor Hockey Association BMHA. He was inducted into the Barrie Sports Hall of Fame in 2009.

== Career statistics ==
=== Regular season and playoffs ===
			Regular season					Playoffs
Season	Team	League	GP	G	A	Pts	PIM	GP	G	A	Pts	PIM
1945–46	Barrie Flyers	OHA	28	3	6	9	79	—	—	—	—	—
1946–47	Barrie Flyers	OHA	31	8	16	24	133	5	3	3	6	8
1947–48	Barrie Flyers	OHA	35	7	21	28	72	13	7	9	16	32
1947–48	Barrie Flyers	M-Cup	—	—	—	—	—	10	0	3	3	31
1948–49	Buffalo Bisons	AHL	35	2	3	5	41	—	—	—	—	—
1948–49	Houston Huskies	USHL	36	3	10	13	45	—	—	—	—	—
1949–50	Buffalo Bisons	AHL	11	0	1	1	10	—	—	—	—	—
1949–50	Louisville Blades	USHL	54	3	14	17	87	—	—	—	—	—
1950–51	Hershey Bears	AHL	64	2	8	10	147	5	0	0	0	10
1951–52	Hershey Bears	AHL	57	2	7	9	111	5	1	0	1	2
1952–53	Hershey Bears	AHL	62	4	8	12	90	3	0	0	0	2
1953–54	Hershey Bears	AHL	24	2	12	14	42	11	0	4	4	9
1953–54	Boston Bruins	NHL	35	1	6	7	39	—	—	—	—	—
1954–55	Pittsburgh Hornets	AHL	56	2	20	22	96	10	0	2	2	8
1955–56	Pittsburgh Hornets	AHL	54	1	13	14	95	4	0	3	3	11
1955–56	Toronto Maple Leafs	NHL	1	0	0	0	4	—	—	—	—	—
1956–57	Owen Sound Mercurys	OHA Sr	26	6	11	17	39	—	—	—	—	—
1957–58	Chatham Maroons	OHA Sr	1	0	0	0	6	—	—	—	—	—
1966–67	Collingwood Georgians	OHA Sr	37	4	26	30	38	—	—	—	—	—
1967–68	Barrie Flyers	OHA Sr	40	1	23	24	45	—	—	—	—	—
1968–69	Barrie Flyers	OHA Sr	3	0	1	1	6	—	—	—	—	—
1969–70	Barrie Flyers	OHA Sr	—	—	—	—	—	—	—	—	—	—
AHL totals			363	15	72	87	632	38	1	9	10	42
NHL totals			36	1	6	7	43	—	—	—	—	—
