= Barrie Flyers (1966–1979) =

Canadian senior ice hockey team

- City: Barrie, Ontario, Canada
- League: OHA Senior "A" 1966–1979; Georgian Bay Int. "A" 1979–1980; Major Int. "A" 1980–1983; OHA Senior "A" 1983–1984
- Operated: 1966–1984
- Home arena: Barrie Arena
- Colours: Orange & White
- Head coach: Harry Pidhirny, Darryl Sly, Ray Gariepy

Franchise history
- 1966–1983: Barrie Flyers
- 1983–1984: Barrie Broncos

The Barrie Flyers were a Canadian men's senior ice hockey team from Barrie, Ontario. They were members of the Ontario Hockey Association (OHA) and played in the OHA Senior A Hockey League from 1966 to 1979, then in the Major Intermediate A Hockey League from 1979 to 1983. The name Barrie Flyers was previously used by a junior ice hockey team from 1945 to 1960.

== History ==
The Barrie Flyers won the J. Ross Robertson Cup as OHA Senior A League champions in 1972, 1974, 1975 and 1976.

The Flyers won the 1974 Allan Cup as Canadian Senior A champions, beating the Cranbrook Royals 4-2 in the playdown final, and were national finalists in 1972, 1975 and 1976. They moved to the Major Intermediate A Hockey League in 1979 and played there until the league folded in 1983. Barrie returned to Senior A in 1983 as the "Broncos."

=== 1972 Allan Cup ===
Barrie won its first OHA Senior A championship and travelled to Spokane, Washington to face the Spokane Jets in the Allan Cup final playdown series. Spokane won the best-of-seven series 4-2.

Game 1 - Barrie 0 at Spokane 3
Game 2 - Barrie 3 at Spokane 8
Game 3 - Barrie 4 at Spokane 2
Game 4 - Barrie 4 at Spokane 1
Game 5 - Barrie 3 at Spokane 7
Game 6 - Barrie 3 at Spokane 6

=== 1974 Allan Cup ===
Barrie recaptured the OHA Senior A championship and advanced to meet the Cranbrook Royals in the Allan Cup final playdown series. All games were played in Cranbrook, British Columbia. Barrie defeated the Royals 4-2 in the best-of-seven series.

Game 1 - Barrie 4 vs Cranbrook 1
Game 2 - Barrie 2 vs Cranbrook 4
Game 3 - Barrie 5 vs Cranbrook 9
Game 4 - Barrie 5 vs Cranbrook 4 (double OT)
Game 5 - Barrie 4 vs Cranbrook 3
Game 6 - Barrie 4 vs Cranbrook 1

=== 1975 Allan Cup ===
Barrie won its third OHA Senior A title in four years and met the Thunder Bay Twins in the Allan Cup final. The first three games in the best-of-seven series were played in Barrie and the remaining games were staged in Thunder Bay, Ontario. The Twins won the series 4-2.

Game 1 - Barrie 8 vs Thunder Bay 5
Game 2 - Barrie 2 vs Thunder Bay 7
Game 3 - Barrie 7 vs Thunder Bay 4
Game 4 - Barrie 2 at Thunder Bay 8
Game 5 - Barrie 2 at Thunder Bay 5
Game 6 - Barrie 4 at Thunder Bay 8

=== 1976 Allan Cup ===
Barrie made its fourth and final trip to the Allan Cup final after winning its third straight OHA Senior A championship and fourth in five years. Once again the Flyers travelled to Spokane, where their opponents were now also known as the Flyers. Spokane swept Barrie 4-0 in the best-of-seven series.

Game 1 - Barrie 4 at Spokane 9
Game 2 - Barrie 1 at Spokane 4
Game 3 - Barrie 4 at Spokane 7
Game 4 - Barrie 2 at Spokane 8

== Season-by-Season results ==
Season	GP	W	L	T	GF	GA	P	Results	Playoffs
1966–67	40	10	27	3	150	204	23	10th OHA Sr. A	
1967–68	40	17	21	2	144	171	36	6th OHA Sr. A	
1968–69	39	24	12	3	208	135	51	2nd OHA Sr. A	Lost Final
1969–70	40	21	15	4	163	133	46	OHA Sr. A	
1970–71	39	24	15	0	183	139	48	OHA Sr. A	
1971–72	40	27	11	2	245	147	56	1st OHA Sr. A	Won League
1972–73	44	34	10	0	239	123	68	1st OHA Sr. A	Lost Final
1973–74	40	30	10	0	172	92	60	1st OHA Sr. A	Won League, Won Allan Cup
1974–75	40	29	10	1	202	131	59	1st OHA Sr. A	Won League
1975–76	44	37	6	1	273	114	75	1st OHA Sr. A	Won League
1976–77	34	19	14	1	180	149	39	5th OHA Sr. A	
1977–78	40	23	16	1	185	160	47	3rd OHA Sr. A	
1978–79	40	13	26	1	153	201	27	6th OHA Sr. A	
1979–80	36	17	19	0	167	195	34	5th GBIAHL	
1980–81	35	18	17	0	213	186	36	5th OHA Int. A	
1981–82	36	12	24	0	192	267	24	6th OHA Int. A	
1982–83	29	9	20	0	159	227	18	4th OHA Int. A	
1983–84	38	10	28	0	183	293	20	8th OHA Sr. A	

== Notable alumni ==
- Bob Dupuis
- Bob Perani
- Darryl Sly
