= Skip Teal =

Canadian ice hockey player

- Born: July 17, 1933; Ridgeway, Ontario, Canada
- Died: July 8, 2006 (aged 72)
- Height: 5 ft 8 in (173 cm)
- Weight: 155 lb (70 kg; 11 st 1 lb)
- Position: Centre
- Shot: Left
- Played for: Boston Bruins
- Playing career: 1953–1963

Alan Leslie "Skip" Teal (July 17, 1933 – July 8, 2006) was a professional ice hockey centre who played in one National Hockey League game for the Boston Bruins during the 1954–55 season, on December 12, 1954 against the Montreal Canadiens. The rest of his career, which lasted from 1953 to 1963, was spent in the minor leagues. He is the older brother of Vic Teal, who also played in only one NHL game.

== Career statistics ==
=== Regular season and playoffs ===
			Regular season					Playoffs
Season	Team	League	GP	G	A	Pts	PIM	GP	G	A	Pts	PIM
1949–50	St. Catharines Teepees	OHA	—	—	—	—	—	3	1	2	3	0
1950–51	St. Catharines Teepees	OHA	51	37	28	65	87	8	1	3	4	4
1951–52	Barrie Flyers	OHA	14	4	9	13	56	—	—	—	—	—
1952–54	Barrie Flyers	OHA	36	26	24	50	48	14	12	6	18	15
1952–53	Barrie Flyers	M-Cup	—	—	—	—	—	10	12	15	27	31
1953–54	Hershey Bears	AHL	66	16	21	37	38	11	3	4	7	16
1954–55	Boston Bruins	NHL	1	0	0	0	0	—	—	—	—	—
1954–55	Hershey Bears	AHL	58	14	29	43	87	—	—	—	—	—
1955–56	Victoria Cougars	WHL	67	22	21	43	34	8	1	1	2	2
1956–57	Quebec Aces	QHL	66	23	41	64	48	10	2	6	8	0
1957–58	Quebec Aces	QHL	60	16	56	72	19	13	6	14	20	4
1957–58	Springfield Indians	AHL	4	0	1	1	0	—	—	—	—	—
1958–59	Quebec Aces	QHL	62	24	38	62	42	—	—	—	—	—
1959–60	Kingston Frontenacs	EPHL	70	27	43	70	30	—	—	—	—	—
1960–61	Clinton Comets	EHL	63	46	66	112	32	4	1	1	2	0
1961–62	Clinton Comets	EHL	59	34	66	100	26	6	2	3	5	2
1962–63	Clinton Comets	EHL	51	35	58	93	12	13	10	8	18	10
EHL totals			173	115	190	305	70	23	13	12	25	12
AHL totals			128	30	51	81	125	11	3	4	7	16
NHL totals			1	0	0	0	0	—	—	—	—	—

== See also ==
- List of players who played only one game in the NHL
