= Darryl Sly =

Canadian ice hockey player

- Born: April 3, 1939 Collingwood, Ontario, Canada
- Died: August 28, 2007 (aged 68) Collingwood, Ontario, Canada
- Height: 5 ft 10 in (178 cm)
- Weight: 185 lb (84 kg; 13 st 3 lb)
- Position: Defence
- Shot: Right
- Played for: Toronto Maple Leafs; Minnesota North Stars; Vancouver Canucks
- National team: Canada
- Playing career: 1960–1978

Olympic medal record

Representing Canada

Men's ice hockey

Olympic Games
Silver medal – second place	1960 Squaw Valley	

World Championships
Gold medal – first place	1961 Switzerland	

Darryl "Slip" Sly (April 3, 1939 – August 28, 2007) was a Canadian ice hockey player who played 79 games in the National Hockey League with the Vancouver Canucks, Toronto Maple Leafs and Minnesota North Stars. He also played parts of 11 seasons with the minor league Rochester Americans (AHL), and seven seasons with the Barrie Flyers (OHA). Internationally Sly played for Canada at the 1960 Winter Olympics, where he won a silver medal, and the 1961 World Championship, where he won gold.

He died on 28 August 2007 at the age of 68.

== Career statistics ==
=== Regular season and playoffs ===
			Regular season					Playoffs
Season	Team	League	GP	G	A	Pts	PIM	GP	G	A	Pts	PIM
1956–57	St. Michael's Majors	OHA	46	7	7	14	35	1	0	0	0	4
1957–58	St. Michael's Majors	OHA	52	19	20	39	64	9	2	4	6	12
1958–59	St. Michael's Majors	OHA	48	8	16	24	58	15	0	3	3	42
1958–59	Kitchener-Waterloo Dutchmen	OHA-Sr	1	0	0	0	0	—	—	—	—	—
1959–60	Kitchener-Waterloo Dutchmen	OHA-Sr	47	4	8	12	63	8	1	1	2	14
1960–61	Galt Terriers	OHA-Sr	12	5	9	14	12	15	7	8	15	24
1960–61	Trail Smoke Eaters	WIHL	13	7	12	19	—	—	—	—	—	—
1960–61	Rochester Americans	AHL	2	0	0	0	0	—	—	—	—	—
1960–61	Canadian National Team	Intl	18	12	6	18	46	—	—	—	—	—
1961–62	Rochester Americans	AHL	70	8	16	24	50	2	0	0	0	0
1962–63	Rochester Americans	AHL	70	4	14	18	52	2	0	0	0	7
1963–64	Rochester Americans	AHL	72	16	16	32	41	2	0	0	0	0
1964–65	Rochester Americans	AHL	72	3	18	21	56	10	1	2	3	8
1965–66	Toronto Maple Leafs	NHL	2	0	0	0	0	—	—	—	—	—
1965–66	Rochester Americans	AHL	67	5	15	20	49	12	2	2	4	12
1966–67	Rochester Americans	AHL	72	8	25	33	56	13	1	0	1	14
1967–68	Toronto Maple Leafs	NHL	17	0	0	0	4	—	—	—	—	—
1967–68	Rochester Americans	AHL	52	3	22	25	36	11	1	6	7	12
1968–69	Vancouver Canucks	WHL	74	6	16	22	45	8	0	1	1	8
1969–70	Minnesota North Stars	NHL	29	1	0	1	6	—	—	—	—	—
1969–70	Iowa Stars	CHL	10	0	8	8	2	11	1	8	9	8
1970–71	Vancouver Canucks	NHL	31	0	2	2	10	—	—	—	—	—
1970–71	Rochester Americans	AHL	37	3	4	7	28	—	—	—	—	—
1971–72	Barrie Flyers	OHA-Sr	33	7	17	24	32	16	1	10	11	16
1972–73	Barrie Flyers	OHA-Sr	41	3	19	22	42	—	—	—	—	—
1972–73	Rochester Americans	AHL	1	1	2	3	0	—	—	—	—	—
1973–74	Barrie Flyers	OHA-Sr	31	3	12	15	15	—	—	—	—	—
1973–74	Rochester Americans	AHL	1	0	0	0	2	—	—	—	—	—
1974–75	Barrie Flyers	OHA-Sr	40	4	10	14	28	—	—	—	—	—
1975–76	Barrie Flyers	OHA-Sr	44	4	16	20	24	—	—	—	—	—
1976–77	Barrie Flyers	OHA-Sr	34	1	10	11	26	—	—	—	—	—
1977–78	Barrie Flyers	OHA-Sr	38	0	5	5	16	—	—	—	—	—
AHL totals			516	51	132	183	370	52	5	10	15	53
NHL totals			79	1	2	3	20	—	—	—	—	—

=== International ===
Year	Team	Event	GP	G	A	Pts	PIM
1960	Canada	Oly	7	1	1	2	9
1961	Canada	WC	7	4	2	6	6
Senior totals			14	5	3	8	15
