= Jerry Toppazzini =

Canadian ice hockey player

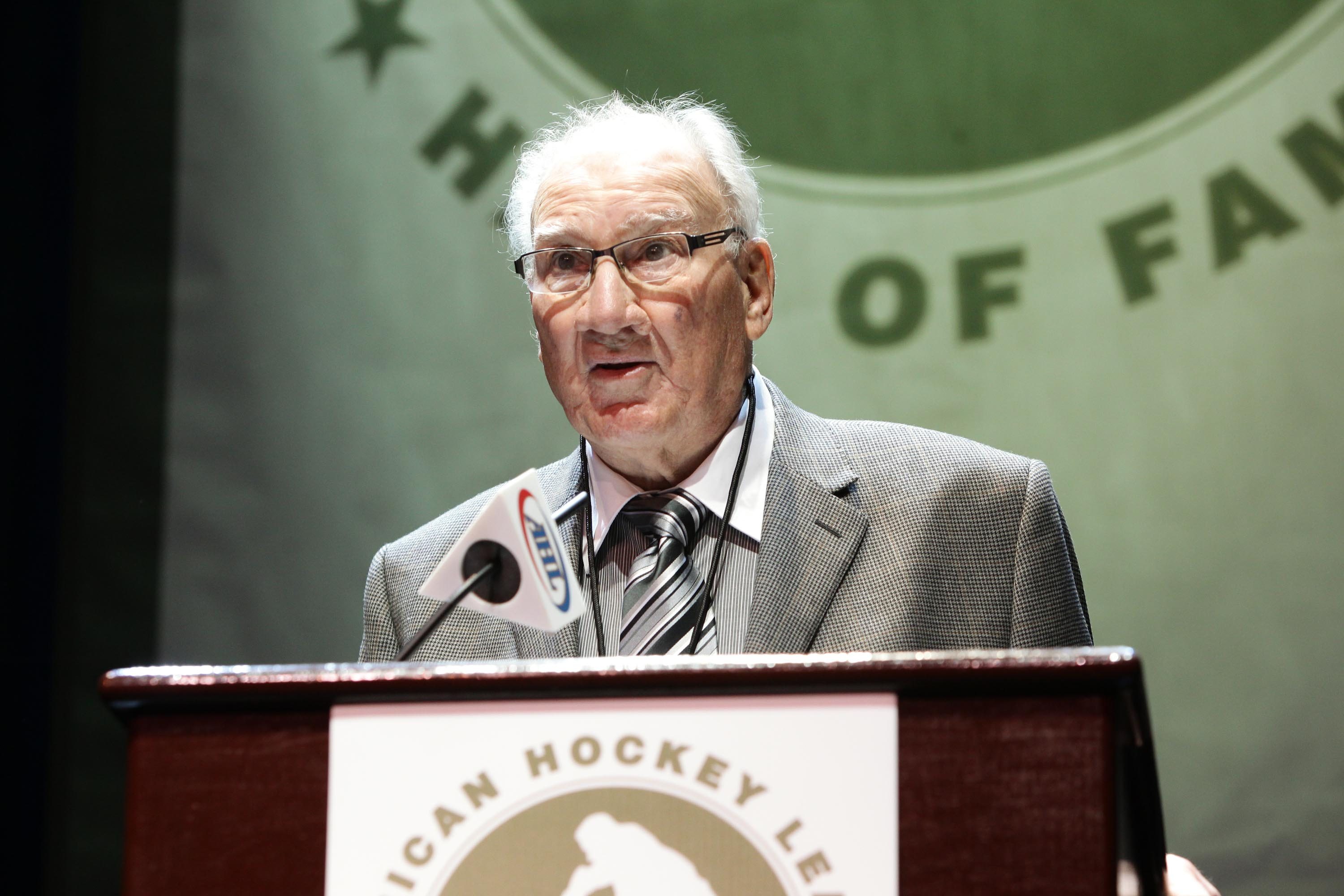
- Toppazzini in January 2012
- Born: July 29, 1931 Copper Cliff, Ontario, Canada
- Died: April 21, 2012 (aged 80) Sudbury, Ontario, Canada
- Height: 6 ft 0 in (183 cm)
- Weight: 205 lb (93 kg; 14 st 9 lb)
- Position: Right wing
- Shot: Right
- Played for: Boston Bruins; Chicago Black Hawks; Detroit Red Wings
- Playing career: 1952–1964

Jerry "Topper" Toppazzini (July 29, 1931 — April 21, 2012) was a Canadian ice hockey forward who played 12 seasons in the National Hockey League (NHL), most notably for the Boston Bruins, between 1952 and 1964. A skilled defensive specialist and penalty killer, he set the then-NHL record for shorthanded goals in a season in 1958 with seven.

== Playing career ==
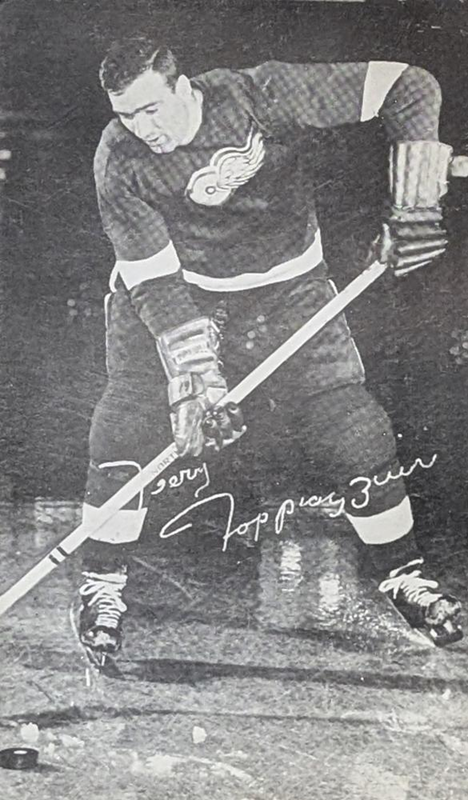
1955-56 postcard of Toppazzini for Detroit Red Wings

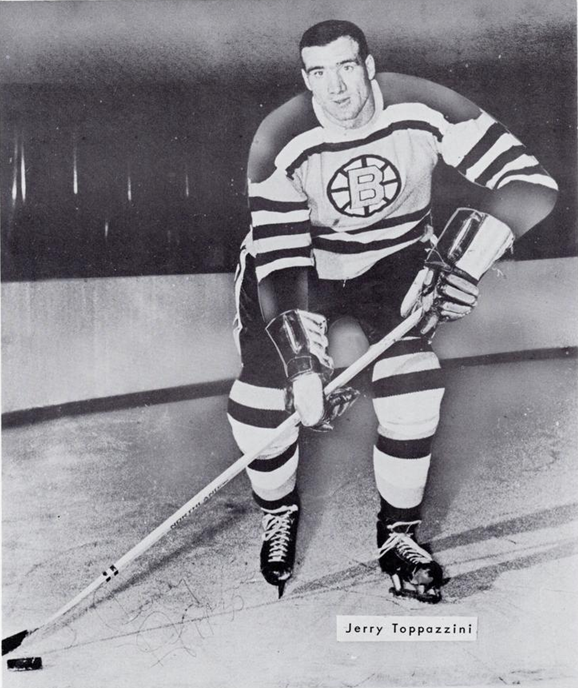
Toppazzini in 1958 photo for Boston Bruins

Toppazzini was born and raised in Copper Cliff, Ontario. He began playing ice hockey for his local team in Copper Cliff before beginning his junior career. He played junior league hockey in the Ontario Hockey Association (OHA), most notably with the Barrie Flyers. In his final season with Barrie in 1951–52, he led the team with 40 goals and 90 points in 54 games, going on to add another 34 points in 23 playoff games to spearhead the Flyers to its first Memorial Cup championship.

Signing with the Boston Bruins, he spent the following season with their American Hockey League (AHL) farm team, the Hershey Bears, playing with his younger brother Teddy and helping the Bears to a division title with 20 goals and 45 points in 54 games.

In the subsequent 1952–53 season, Toppazzini made his National Hockey League (NHL) debut with the Bruins, scoring 23 points in 69 games. The following season, splitting time between Hershey and the major league club, he was traded to the Chicago Black Hawks for centre Gus Bodnar, and was subsequently dealt to the Detroit Red Wings in an eight-man multi-player deal, which at the time was the largest transaction in league history. He was traded back to the Bruins in 1956 for centre Murray Costello and left wing Lorne Ferguson. Toppazzini made an immediate impact, as the Bruins – in last place at the time – made a run for the playoffs, missing at the end by a single win.

Toppazzini remained with Boston for the next nine seasons, blossoming into a skilled two-way player while playing on a line with smooth centre Don McKenney and hard charging left wing Fleming Mackell; the trio was Boston's best line as they surged to the 1957 Stanley Cup Finals, knocking off the heavily favoured former champion Detroit Red Wings en route. His best seasons statistically were 1957–58, when he scored a career-high 25 goals in the regular season and added nine goals in the Stanley Cup playoffs (with a hat-trick against the New York Rangers and three game-winning goals) in leading the Bruins to the 1958 Stanley Cup Finals, as Boston would mount a serious challenge to the dynastic Montreal Canadiens for NHL supremacy and 1961–62, when he scored 19 goals en route to a career-high 50 points. Always a fan favourite, he won the Elizabeth C. Dufresne Trophy twice in a row, in 1956–57 and 1957–58, as the best performing and most popular Boston Bruin at home games. He was noted in his time with the Bruins for his "crazy chatter" in the locker room. According to teammate Bronco Horvath:

"Topper was always giving everybody the business, keeping up a competitive atmosphere. Drove me nuts."

Boston traded the fading Toppazzini in the 1964 off-season, and he played the remaining four seasons of his professional career in the minor leagues, spending the 1964–65 season with the Pittsburgh Hornets of the AHL. His rights were then acquired by the Los Angeles Blades of the Western Hockey League (WHL) in the 1965 reverse draft; he initially held out before joining the Blades for the 1965–66 and 1966–67 seasons. He finished his playing career in 1967–68 as the player-coach of the Port Huron Flags of the International Hockey League (IHL).

=== Goaltending stint ===
During the 1960–61 season, on October 16, 1960, Toppazzini substituted for Boston goaltender Don Simmons, who was injured with 30 seconds left in a match against the Chicago Black Hawks, in which the Bruins were losing 5–2. At the time, teams were not required to carry a backup goaltender on the bench, although they were required to have one available in the arena. Reportedly, Toppazzini did not want to wait for the Black Hawks' house goaltender to suit up. He faced no shots in his brief stint. By the 1965 Stanley Cup playoffs, the NHL ruled that all teams must have a spare goaltender on the bench and ready to play. Toppazzini is thus the last position player to substitute in goal during an NHL match.

== Coaching career ==
After his retirement as a player, Toppazzini was named coach of the Springfield Kings of the American Hockey League in 1972, but was let go after two seasons in which the Kings finished in last place both years. He went on to coach the Sudbury Wolves of the OHA between 1975 and 1977, and met with much better success, leading the team to a first and second-place finish and winning the Matt Leyden Trophy as the OHA's Coach of the Year award in 1976.

== Retirement and death ==
After his retirement from coaching, Toppazzini settled in Sudbury, Ontario, where he opened a men's clothing store. He also opened a well-known Bruins-themed bar in Sudbury known as the "Beef n'Bird." He remained active in local charitable affairs.

Toppazzini died on April 21, 2012, following a short illness.

== Career statistics ==
=== Regular season and playoffs ===
			Regular season					Playoffs
Season	Team	League	GP	G	A	Pts	PIM	GP	G	A	Pts	PIM
1947–48	Copper Cliff Junior Redmen	NOJHA	9	4	1	5	0	3	1	2	3	0
1947–48	Copper Cliff Junior Redmen	M-Cup	—	—	—	—	—	7	2	3	5	2
1948–49	St. Catharines Teepees	OHA	45	24	20	44	37	5	2	2	4	4
1949–50	Barrie Flyers	OHA	36	15	17	32	60	9	1	4	5	4
1950–51	Barrie Flyers	OHA	54	40	50	90	116	12	7	9	16	15
1950–51	Barrie Flyers	M-Cup	—	—	—	—	—	11	7	11	18	28
1951–52	Hershey Bears	AHL	54	20	25	45	26	5	0	1	1	4
1952–53	Boston Bruins	NHL	69	10	13	23	36	11	0	3	3	9
1953–54	Boston Bruins	NHL	37	0	5	5	24	—	—	—	—	—
1953–54	Hershey Bears	AHL	16	5	10	15	23	—	—	—	—	—
1953–54	Chicago Black Hawks	NHL	14	5	3	8	18	—	—	—	—	—
1954–55	Chicago Black Hawks	NHL	70	9	18	27	59	—	—	—	—	—
1955–56	Detroit Red Wings	NHL	40	1	7	8	31	—	—	—	—	—
1955–56	Boston Bruins	NHL	28	7	7	14	22	—	—	—	—	—
1956–57	Boston Bruins	NHL	55	15	23	38	26	10	0	1	1	2
1957–58	Boston Bruins	NHL	64	25	24	49	51	12	9	3	12	2
1958–59	Boston Bruins	NHL	70	21	23	44	61	7	4	2	6	0
1959–60	Boston Bruins	NHL	69	12	33	45	26	—	—	—	—	—
1960–61	Boston Bruins	NHL	67	15	35	50	35	—	—	—	—	—
1961–62	Boston Bruins	NHL	70	19	31	50	26	—	—	—	—	—
1962–63	Boston Bruins	NHL	65	17	18	35	6	—	—	—	—	—
1963–64	Boston Bruins	NHL	65	7	4	11	15	—	—	—	—	—
1964–65	Pittsburgh Hornets	AHL	65	16	31	47	32	4	2	6	8	0
1965–66	Los Angeles Blades	WHL	47	6	17	23	8	—	—	—	—	—
1966–67	Los Angeles Blades	WHL	59	19	37	56	22	—	—	—	—	—
1967–68	Port Huron Flags	IHL	37	11	26	37	25	—	—	—	—	—
NHL totals			783	163	244	407	436	40	13	9	22	13

== Achievements and legacy ==
- Was named to play in the National Hockey League All-Star Game in 1955, 1958 and 1959. Also named to play in a benefit All-Star Game between the NHL All-Stars and the Buffalo Bisons in February, 1959.
- Led the NHL in games played with 70 in 1959 and 1962.
- Toppazzini's older brother Zellio, a long time star for the minor league Providence Reds, also played in the NHL for the Bruins and New York Rangers between the 1949 and 1951 seasons.
- On March 27, 1958, Toppazzini scored an overtime goal in the semifinals to defeat the Rangers 4-3.
- His grandnephew Justin Williams played in the NHL, starting in 2000
- As of October 2020, Toppazzini ranks 30th in Bruins history with 151 regular-season goals scored.
- As of November 2014 Toppazzinni ranks 31st in Boston history in regular-season points scored.

== Transactions ==
- February 16, 1954: Traded to Chicago Black Hawks for Gus Bodnar.
- May 27, 1955: Traded to Detroit Red Wings with Dave Creighton, Gord Hollingworth and John McCormack for Tony Leswick, Glen Skov, Johnny Wilson and Benny Woit.
- January 17, 1956: Traded to Boston Bruins with Real Chevrefils for Murray Costello and Lorne Ferguson.
- June 9, 1964: Traded to Chicago Black Hawks with Matt Ravlich for Murray Balfour and Mike Draper.
- October 10, 1964: Traded to Pittsburgh Hornets for Hank Ciesla.
- June 9, 1965: Claimed by Los Angeles Blades in Reverse Draft.
- In 2023 he would be named one of the top 100 Bruins players of all time.
