= 1951 Memorial Cup =

Canadian junior ice hockey championship

The Memorial Cup trophy

The 1951 Memorial Cup final was the 33rd junior ice hockey championship of the Canadian Amateur Hockey Association. The George Richardson Memorial Trophy champions Barrie Flyers of the Ontario Hockey Association in Eastern Canada competed against the Abbott Cup champions Winnipeg Monarchs of the Manitoba Junior Hockey League in Western Canada. In a best-of-seven series, held at Winnipeg Amphitheatre in Winnipeg and the Wheat City Arena in Brandon, Manitoba, Barrie won their 1st Memorial Cup, defeating Winnipeg 4 games to 0.

== Scores ==
- Game 1: Barrie 5-1 Winnipeg (in Winnipeg)
- Game 2: Barrie 5-1 Winnipeg (in Winnipeg)
- Game 3: Barrie 4-3 Winnipeg (in Brandon)
- Game 4: Barrie 9-5 Winnipeg (in Winnipeg)

== Winning roster ==
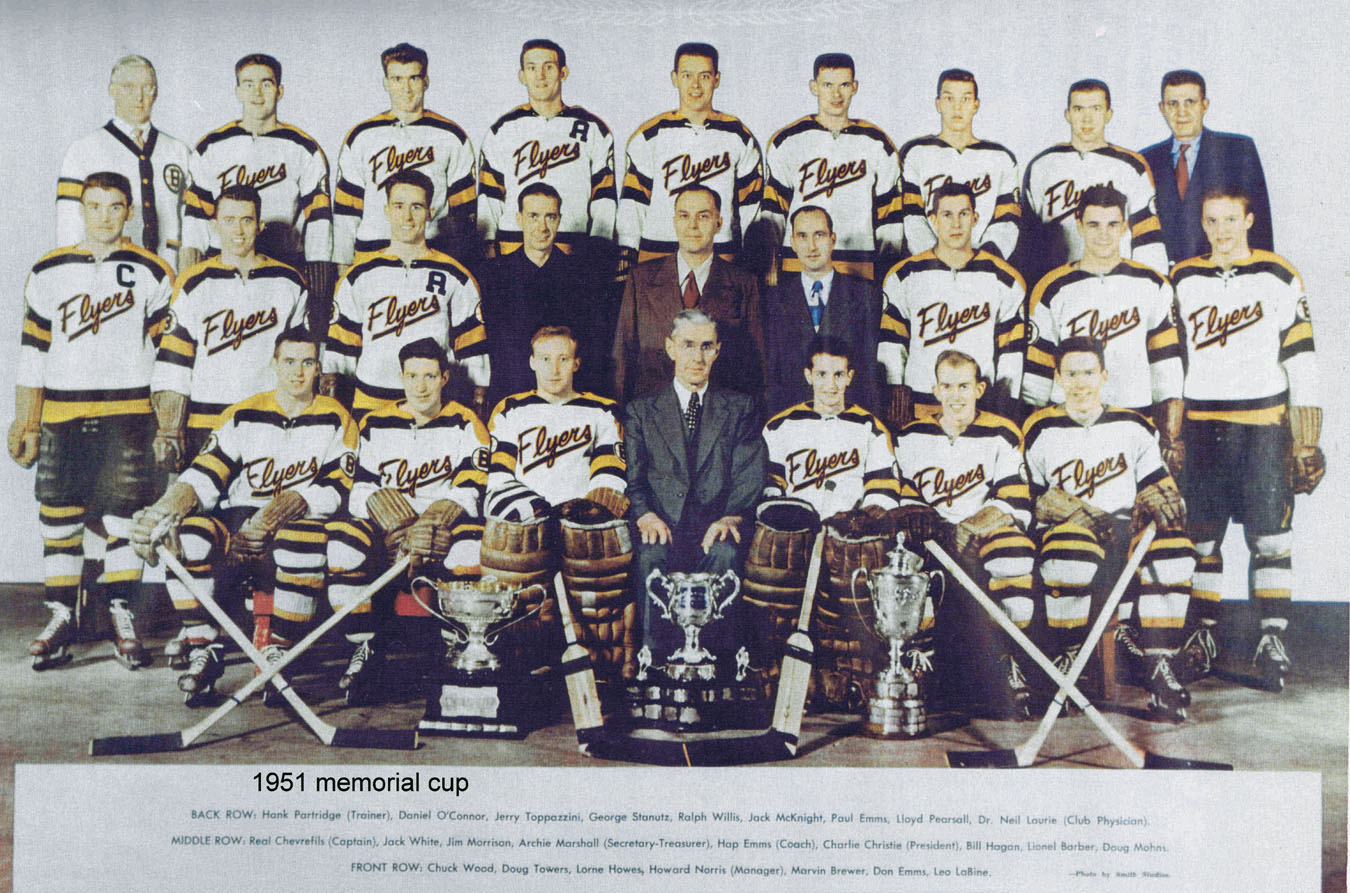
Memorial Cup Winner 1951 Barrie Flyers

Lionel Barber, Marvin Brewer, Real Chevrefils, Don Emms, Paul Emms, Bill Hagan, Lorne Howes, Leo Labine, Jack McKnight, Doug Mohns, Jim Morrison, Daniel O'Connor, Lloyd Pearsall, George Stanutz, Jerry Toppazzini, Doug Towers, Ralph Willis, Chuck Woods, Jack White. Coach: Hap Emms
