= Kelly Burnett =

Canadian ice hockey player (1926–2018)

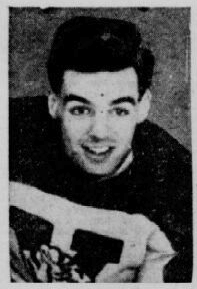
- Kelly Burnett pictured with the Victoriaville Tigers, circa 1947
- Born: June 16, 1926; Lachine, Quebec, Canada
- Died: December 22, 2018 (aged 92); Halifax, Nova Scotia, Canada
- Height: 5 ft 10 in (178 cm)
- Weight: 160 lb (73 kg; 11 st 6 lb)
- Position: Centre
- Shot: Left
- Played for: New York Rangers
- Playing career: 1947–1961

James Kelvin Burnett (June 16, 1926 – December 22, 2018) was a Canadian ice hockey centre. He played 3 games in the National Hockey League for the New York Rangers during the 1952–53 season. The rest of his career lasted from 1946 to 1961 and was spent in the minor leagues.

== Career statistics ==
=== Regular season and playoffs ===
			Regular season					Playoffs
Season	Team	League	GP	G	A	Pts	PIM	GP	G	A	Pts	PIM
1943–44	Montreal Junior Canadiens	QJAHA	15	11	12	23	0	3	3	3	6	0
1944–45	Montreal Junior Canadiens	QJAHA	13	20	6	26	4	9	6	5	11	2
1944–45	Montreal Junior Royals	M-Cup	—	—	—	—	—	6	2	2	4	0
1945–46	Barrie Flyers	OHA	3	5	1	6	2	—	—	—	—	—
1945–46	Montreal Junior Canadiens	QJAHA	12	10	6	16	2	6	4	7	11	2
1945–46	Montreal Junior Canadiens	M-Cup	—	—	—	—	—	5	4	6	10	2
1946–47	Victoriaville Tigres	QPHL	50	40	75	115	18	2	1	3	4	0
1947–48	Victoriaville Tigres	QPHL	50	36	71	107	8	11	11	7	18	0
1947–48	Victoriaville Tigres	Al-Cup	—	—	—	—	—	3	0	2	2	0
1948–49	Sherbrooke Red Raiders	QSHL	63	37	38	75	40	12	4	7	11	2
1949–50	Springfield Indians	AHL	67	27	49	76	14	2	0	1	1	0
1950–51	Springfield Indians	AHL	68	26	48	74	12	3	0	0	0	0
1951–52	Syracuse Warriors	AHL	68	25	43	68	10	—	—	—	—	—
1952–53	New York Rangers	NHL	3	1	0	1	0	—	—	—	—	—
1952–53	Syracuse Warriors	AHL	56	23	53	76	16	4	1	3	4	0
1953–54	Syracuse Warriors	AHL	45	8	29	37	12	—	—	—	—	—
1954–55	Montreal Royals	QSHL	62	30	46	76	12	14	4	4	8	0
1955–56	Montreal Royals	QSHL	58	25	40	65	22	12	3	2	5	4
1956–57	Montreal Royals	QSHL	67	22	35	57	28	4	3	1	4	0
1957–58	Montreal Royals	QSHL	55	32	36	68	14	7	2	6	8	0
1958–59	Montreal Royals	QSHL	57	16	28	44	6	8	2	5	7	2
1959–60	Montreal Royals	EPHL	66	23	30	53	26	7	3	4	7	2
1960–61	Montreal Royals	EPHL	3	0	1	1	0	—	—	—	—	—
AHL totals			304	109	222	331	64	9	1	4	5	0
QSHL totals			362	162	223	385	122	57	18	25	43	8
NHL totals			3	1	0	1	0	—	—	—	—	—
