= 1953 Memorial Cup =

Canadian junior ice hockey championship

The Memorial Cup trophy

The 1953 Memorial Cup final was the 35th junior ice hockey championship of the Canadian Amateur Hockey Association. The George Richardson Memorial Trophy champions Barrie Flyers of the Ontario Hockey Association in Eastern Canada competed against the Abbott Cup champions St. Boniface Canadiens of the Manitoba Junior Hockey League in Western Canada. In a best-of-seven series, held at Shea's Amphitheatre in Winnipeg, Manitoba and the Wheat City Arena in Brandon, Manitoba, Barrie won their 2nd Memorial Cup, defeating Winnipeg 4 games to 1.

During game three of the 1953 Western Canada final, Leo Konyk scored an overtime game-winning goal for the St. Boniface Canadiens, then grabbed Fred Page who was refereeing, and began dancing with him at center ice. After the incident, Page implied that he did not like dancing.

== Scores ==
- Game 1: Monday April 27, Barrie 6-4 St. Boniface (in Winnipeg)
- Game 2: Wednesday April 29, Barrie 6-3 St. Boniface (in Brandon)
- Game 3: Friday May 1, Barrie 7-5 St. Boniface (in Winnipeg)
- Game 4: Monday May 4, St. Boniface 7-4 Barrie (in Winnipeg)
- Game 5: Wednesday May 6, Barrie 6-1 St. Boniface (in Winnipeg)

== Winning roster ==
Orin Carver, Don Cherry, George Cuculick, Marv Edwards, Bill Harrington, Jack Higgins, Tim Hook, John Martan, Don McKenney, Doug Mohns, Fred Pletsch, Tony Poeta, Jim Robertson, Ken Robertson, Skip Teal, Orval Tessier, Larry Thibault, Ralph Willis, Bob White. Coach: Hap Emms
