= Norval Olsen =

Canadian ice hockey player

Norval "Red" Olsen is a retired Canadian ice hockey winger. He learned to skate on Boulevard Lake in front of his home in the neighborhood of Current River. In 1947 at age 18, he was recruited to play for the Port Arthur West-End Bruins by coach Ed Lauzon where he played defence on right wing and shot right.

The team went on to win the Memorial Cup that season against the Barrie Flyers. He played for the team again the following season, but they were eliminated from the play-offs by the Brandon Wheat Kings.

Red played for a variety of teams after his stint with the Port Arthur Bruins, including the Port Arthur Bearcats, the North Sidney Victorious, the Moncton Hawks, the Niagara Falls Cataracts, the Troy Bruins, the Fort Wayne Komets, the Kingston Merchants, the Milwaukee Falcons, and the Charlotte Checkers.

In 1961, he played with the Port Arthur Bearcats in the O'Hearn Trophy series held in Stockholm, Sweden. In 1962-63 and 1963–64, he coached the Turko, a Finnish team.
