= Doug Mohns =

Canadian ice hockey player

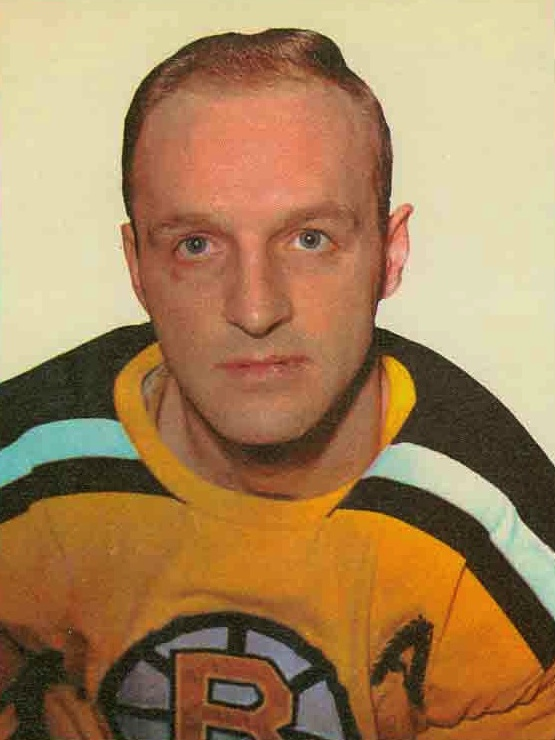
- Mohns with the Boston Bruins in 1962
- Born: December 13, 1933 Capreol, Ontario, Canada
- Died: February 7, 2014 (aged 80) Reading, Massachusetts, U.S.
- Height: 6 ft 0 in (183 cm)
- Weight: 185 lb (84 kg; 13 st 3 lb)
- Position: Left wing/Defence
- Shot: Left
- Played for: Boston Bruins; Chicago Black Hawks; Minnesota North Stars; Atlanta Flames; Washington Capitals
- Playing career: 1953–1975

Douglas Allen "Diesel" Mohns (December 13, 1933 – February 7, 2014) was a Canadian professional ice hockey player who played 22 seasons in the National Hockey League (NHL) from 1953–54 until 1974–75. Mohns twice won the most coveted prize in junior hockey, the Memorial Cup. He played on the 1951 and 1953 Barrie Flyers teams.

== Junior career ==
Mohns was born and raised in Capreol, Ontario, a town located 25 km north of Sudbury, Ontario. He began playing hockey for his hometown team in Capreol before moving on to the Ontario Hockey Association'ss Barrie Flyers in 1951. He stayed with the Flyers until 1953 when he moved on to the National Hockey League's Boston Bruins.

== NHL career ==
Mohns played 1390 career NHL games, scoring 248 goals and 462 assists for 710 points, as well as compiling 1250 penalty minutes. Mohns played both forward and defence in his career. Mohns joined the Boston Bruins in 1953, where he became a versatile cornerstone of that franchise for 11 seasons. An early slapshot expert, he combined skating speed and breakout passing skills with rugged reliability. Mohns starred with Bruins captain and blueline Stalwart Fern Flaman on defence and longtime teammate, smooth Centre Don McKenney on offence, during the Bruins' halcyon years of the late 1950s. Mohns became an alternate captain with the Boston Bruins in 1960. He remained a team pillar during the difficult reconstruction period of the early 1960s.

Mohns achieved much of his later career success with the Chicago Black Hawks. He played left wing on one of the greatest lines in NHL history, the "Scooter Line", with centre Stan Mikita and right wing Kenny Wharram. Their speed and puck handling ability fueled the Black Hawks' high-powered offence during this time period. He was also known as an enforcer for Bobby Hull. Mohns finished his 22 season long career as the captain of the expansion Washington Capitals. He was one of the first players to wear a helmet.

== After retirement ==
Mohns’ marriage to Jane Foster ended with her death in 1988. In addition to his wife, Tabor Ansin Mohns, he is survived by a sister, Erma Wilson; a son, Douglas Jr.; a daughter, Andrea Brillaud; a stepson, Greg Ansin; a stepdaughter, Lisa Ansin; and nine grandchildren. Mohns was heavily involved with charity activities, including serving on the board of the Dianne DeVanna Center in support of family health, and with the local food pantry.

Mohns died on February 7, 2014, at the age of 80, of myelodysplastic syndrome.

== Career statistics ==
			Regular season					Playoffs
Season	Team	League	GP	G	A	Pts	PIM	GP	G	A	Pts	PIM
1950–51	Capreol Caps	NOJHA	—	—	—	—	—	—	—	—	—	—
1950–51	Barrie Flyers	OHA-Jr.	—	—	—	—	—	1	0	0	0	0
1950–51	Barrie Flyers	MC	—	—	—	—	—	4	1	0	1	4
1951–52	Barrie Flyers	OHA-Jr.	53	40	36	76	46	—	—	—	—	—
1952–53	Barrie Flyers	OHA-Jr.	56	34	42	76	28	15	5	4	9	8
1952–53	Barrie Flyers	MC	—	—	—	—	—	10	6	12	18	14
1953–54	Boston Bruins	NHL	70	13	14	27	27	4	1	0	1	4
1954–55	Boston Bruins	NHL	70	14	18	32	82	5	0	0	0	4
1955–56	Boston Bruins	NHL	64	10	8	18	48	—	—	—	—	—
1956–57	Boston Bruins	NHL	68	6	34	40	89	10	2	3	5	2
1957–58	Boston Bruins	NHL	54	5	16	21	28	12	3	10	13	18
1958–59	Boston Bruins	NHL	47	6	24	30	40	4	0	2	2	12
1959–60	Boston Bruins	NHL	65	20	25	45	62	—	—	—	—	—
1960–61	Boston Bruins	NHL	65	12	21	33	63	—	—	—	—	—
1961–62	Boston Bruins	NHL	69	16	29	45	74	—	—	—	—	—
1962–63	Boston Bruins	NHL	68	7	23	30	63	—	—	—	—	—
1963–64	Boston Bruins	NHL	70	9	17	26	95	—	—	—	—	—
1964–65	Chicago Black Hawks	NHL	49	13	20	33	84	14	3	4	7	21
1965–66	Chicago Black Hawks	NHL	70	22	27	49	63	5	1	0	1	4
1966–67	Chicago Black Hawks	NHL	61	25	35	60	58	5	0	5	5	8
1967–68	Chicago Black Hawks	NHL	65	24	29	53	53	11	1	5	6	12
1968–69	Chicago Black Hawks	NHL	65	22	19	41	47	—	—	—	—	—
1969–70	Chicago Black Hawks	NHL	66	6	27	33	46	8	0	2	2	15
1970–71	Chicago Black Hawks	NHL	39	4	6	10	16	—	—	—	—	—
1970–71	Minnesota North Stars	NHL	17	2	5	7	14	6	2	2	4	10
1971–72	Minnesota North Stars	NHL	78	6	30	36	82	4	1	2	3	10
1972–73	Minnesota North Stars	NHL	67	4	13	17	52	6	0	1	1	2
1973–74	Atlanta Flames	NHL	28	0	3	3	10	—	—	—	—	—
1974–75	Washington Capitals	NHL	75	2	19	21	54	—	—	—	—	—
NHL totals			1,390	248	462	710	1,250	94	14	36	50	122

== Awards and accomplishments ==
- Played in NHL All-Star game (1954, 1958, 1959, 1961, 1962, 1965, 1972)
- Named One of the Top 100 Best Bruins Players of all Time.

== See also ==
- List of NHL players with 1,000 games played

Preceded by Position created	Washington Capitals captain 1974–75	Succeeded by Bill Clement
