= Zellio Toppazzini =

Canadian ice hockey player

- Born: January 5, 1930 Copper Cliff, Ontario, Canada
- Died: April 1, 2001 (aged 71) Providence, Rhode Island, U.S.
- Height: 5 ft 11 in (180 cm)
- Weight: 180 lb (82 kg; 12 st 12 lb)
- Position: Right wing
- Shot: Right
- Played for: Boston Bruins; New York Rangers; Chicago Black Hawks
- Playing career: 1947–1964

Zellio Toppazzini
Coaching career (HC unless noted)
- 1964–1968: Providence

Head coaching record
- Overall: 31–60–1 (.342)

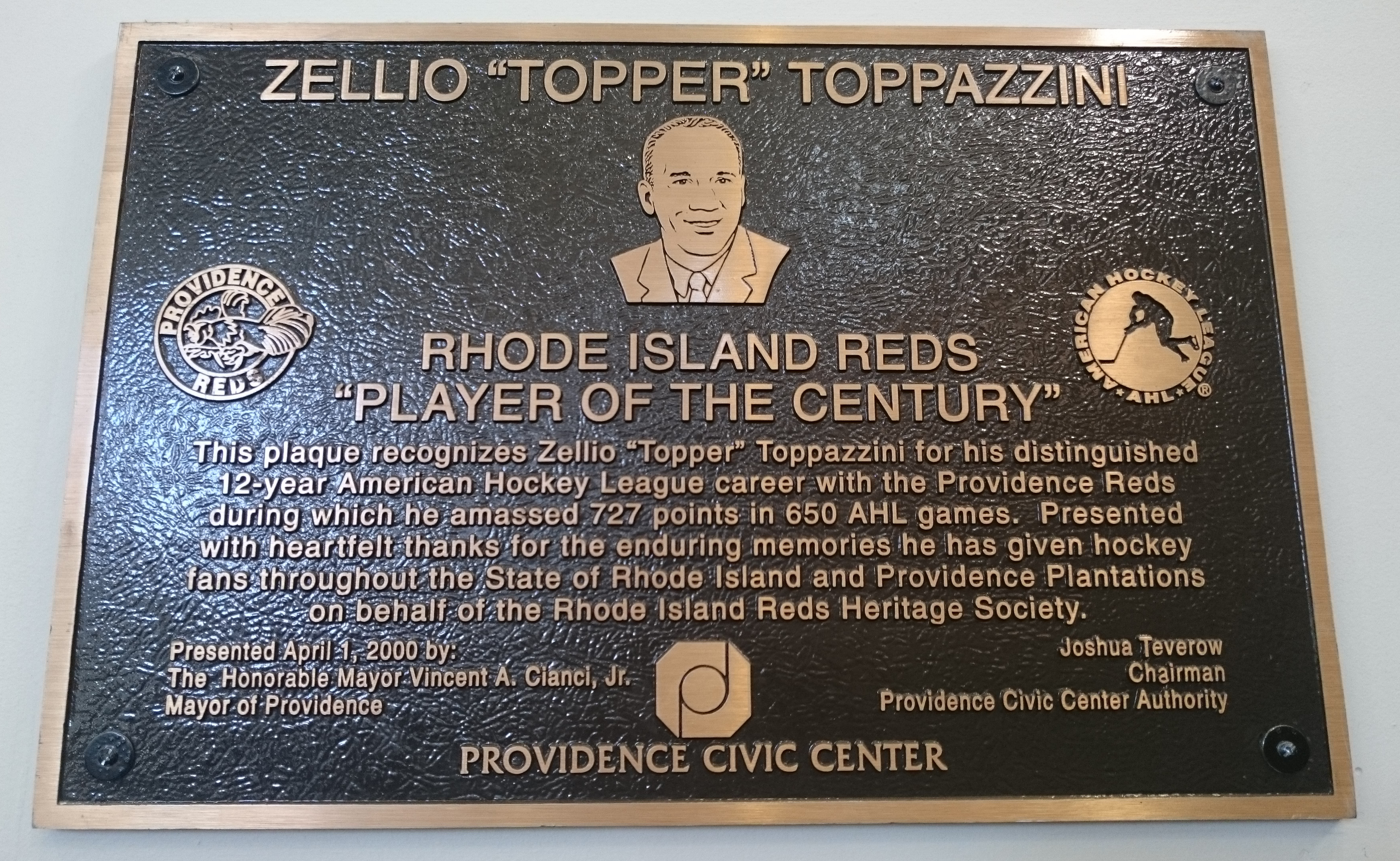
Plaque at the Dunkin' Donuts Center in honor of Toppazzini

Zellio Louis Peter Toppazzini (January 5, 1930 – April 1, 2001) was a Canadian professional ice hockey player who played 123 games in the National Hockey League with the Boston Bruins, New York Rangers, and Chicago Black Hawks between 1949 and 1956. The rest of his career, which lasted from 1948 to 1964, was mainly spent with the Providence Reds of the American Hockey League. He was the brother of Jerry Toppazzini, who played in the NHL from 1952 to 1964, and the great-uncle of Justin Williams, who played in the NHL from 2000 to 2020.

== Playing career ==
Toppazzini spent most of his career with the American Hockey League's Providence Reds. Nicknamed "Topper", Toppazzini is the all-time leading scorer in Reds history. During his 12 years with the Reds, from 1951 to 1964, he amassed 279 goals, 448 assists, and 727 points in 650 regular-season games, and another 16–28–44 in playoff action. All are team records.

In 1955–56, the line of Toppazzini, Paul Larivee, and Camille Henry spearheaded the Reds to both regular season and Calder Cup championships. Toppazzini earned career highs of 42 goals, 71 assists, and 113 points in leading the AHL in scoring, and in the playoffs, he also added 7–13–20.

== Post-playing career ==
In 2000, the Rhode Island Reds Heritage Society named Toppazzini its "Player of the Century"; it presents an annual award in his honor. In 2012, Zellio was inducted into the AHL Hall of Fame.

Toppazzini coached the Providence College hockey team for four seasons from 1964–65 through 1967–68, compiling a 31–60–1 (0.342) record. His best and only winning season behind the PC bench was his first year (1964–65) when the Friars went 14–11–1 (0.558). Toppazzini was replaced by Lou Lamoriello.

Toppazzini was inducted as a charter member of the Rhode Island Hockey Hall of Fame in 2018.

== Career statistics ==
=== Regular season and playoffs ===
			Regular season					Playoffs
Season	Team	League	GP	G	A	Pts	PIM	GP	G	A	Pts	PIM
1946–47	Copper Cliff Jr. Redmen	NOJHA	9	10	3	13	6	5	4	4	8	5
1947–48	St. Catharines Teepees	OHA	33	27	18	45	53	3	4	4	8	2
1948–49	Boston Bruins	NHL	5	1	1	2	0	2	0	0	0	0
1948–49	Hershey Bears	AHL	49	9	14	23	15	—	—	—	—	—
1949–50	Boston Bruins	NHL	36	5	5	10	18	—	—	—	—	—
1949–50	Hershey Bears	AHL	34	16	9	25	6	—	—	—	—	—
1950–51	Boston Bruins	NHL	4	0	1	1	0	—	—	—	—	—
1950–51	Hershey Bears	AHL	12	6	5	11	2	—	—	—	—	—
1950–51	New York Rangers	NHL	55	14	14	28	27	—	—	—	—	—
1951–52	New York Rangers	NHL	16	1	1	2	4	—	—	—	—	—
1951–52	Cincinnati Mohawks	AHL	7	2	4	6	0	—	—	—	—	—
1951–52	Providence Reds	AHL	33	20	25	45	6	11	3	7	10	2
1952–53	Providence Reds	AHL	64	35	32	67	23	—	—	—	—	—
1953–54	Providence Reds	AHL	70	33	43	76	18	—	—	—	—	—
1954–55	Providence Reds	AHL	62	21	53	74	12	—	—	—	—	—
1955–56	Providence Reds	AHL	64	42	71	113	44	9	7	13	20	2
1956–57	Chicago Black Hawks	NHL	7	0	0	0	0	—	—	—	—	—
1956–57	Providence Reds	AHL	44	13	40	53	16	5	0	1	1	4
1957–58	Providence Reds	AHL	70	27	42	69	14	5	1	1	2	0
1958–59	Providence Reds	AHL	67	17	38	55	14	—	—	—	—	—
1960–61	Providence Reds	AHL	68	31	34	65	2	—	—	—	—	—
1961–62	Providence Reds	AHL	66	21	36	57	2	3	1	2	3	0
1962–63	Providence Reds	AHL	61	16	24	40	10	6	4	4	8	0
1963–64	Providence Reds	AHL	14	1	6	7	0	1	0	0	0	0
AHL totals			785	310	476	786	184	40	16	28	44	8
NHL totals			123	21	22	43	49	2	0	0	0	0

== Head coaching record ==
Record table
Season	Team	Overall	Conference	Standing	Postseason
Providence Friars (ECAC Hockey) (1964–1968)
1964–65	Providence	14–11–1	7–9–1	8th	ECAC Quarterfinals
1965–66	Providence	7–14–0	2–12–0	14th	
1966–67	Providence	3–17–0	2–13–0	14th	
1967–68	Providence	7–18–0	3–13–0	15th	
Providence:		31–60–1	14–47–1		
Total:		31–60–1			
National champion Postseason invitational champion Conference regular season champion Conference regular season and conference tournament champion Division regular season champion Division regular season and conference tournament champion Conference tournament champion
