= Barrie Arena =

Ice hockey arena in Barrie, Ontario

Coordinates: 44.385480°N 79.69697°W

- Dunlop Arena
- Interactive map of Barrie Arena
- Address: 155 Dunlop Street West
- Location: Barrie, Ontario, Canada
- Capacity: 3,000

Construction
- Groundbreaking: 1934
- Opened: 1934
- Closed: 2007
- Demolished: 2008

Tenants
- Barrie Flyers (1945 - 1960); Barrie Flyers (1966 - 1979); Barrie Colts (1995)

The Barrie Arena, sometimes also called the Dunlop Arena, was a 3,000 seat arena located in Barrie, Ontario, at the intersection of Dunlop Street West and Eccles Avenue. It was built in 1932 and served as the main ice hockey venue in the city until the opening of the Barrie Molson Centre in 1995. The arena hosted the Barrie Flyers of the Ontario Hockey League, and also briefly hosted the Barrie Colts while the BMC was under construction.

In March 2008, Barrie City Council approved the demolition of the arena so that the city's new Fire Hall No. 1 could be built on the site. The demolition of the arena commenced in July and was completed in September. Artifacts recovered from the arena, including original wood trusses, were incorporated into a heritage display in the new fire hall.
