= Leo Labine =

Canadian ice hockey player

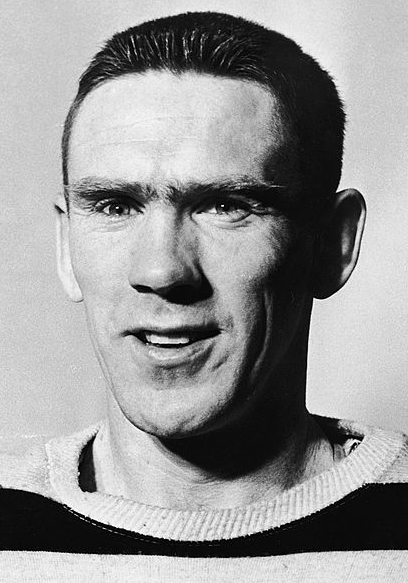
- Born: July 22, 1931; Haileybury, Ontario, Canada
- Died: February 26, 2005 (aged 73); North Bay, Ontario, Canada
- Height: 5 ft 10 in (178 cm)
- Weight: 180 lb (82 kg; 12 st 12 lb)
- Position: Right wing
- Shot: Right
- Played for: Boston Bruins; Detroit Red Wings
- Playing career: 1950–1967

Leonard Gerald "Leo The Lion" Labine (July 22, 1931 – February 25, 2005) was a Canadian professional ice hockey player. A native of Haileybury, Ontario, Labine played for teams in the NHL, WHL, EPHL, and the AHL. At 5'10", and 178 lbs, Labine had a long and varied career.

== Biography ==
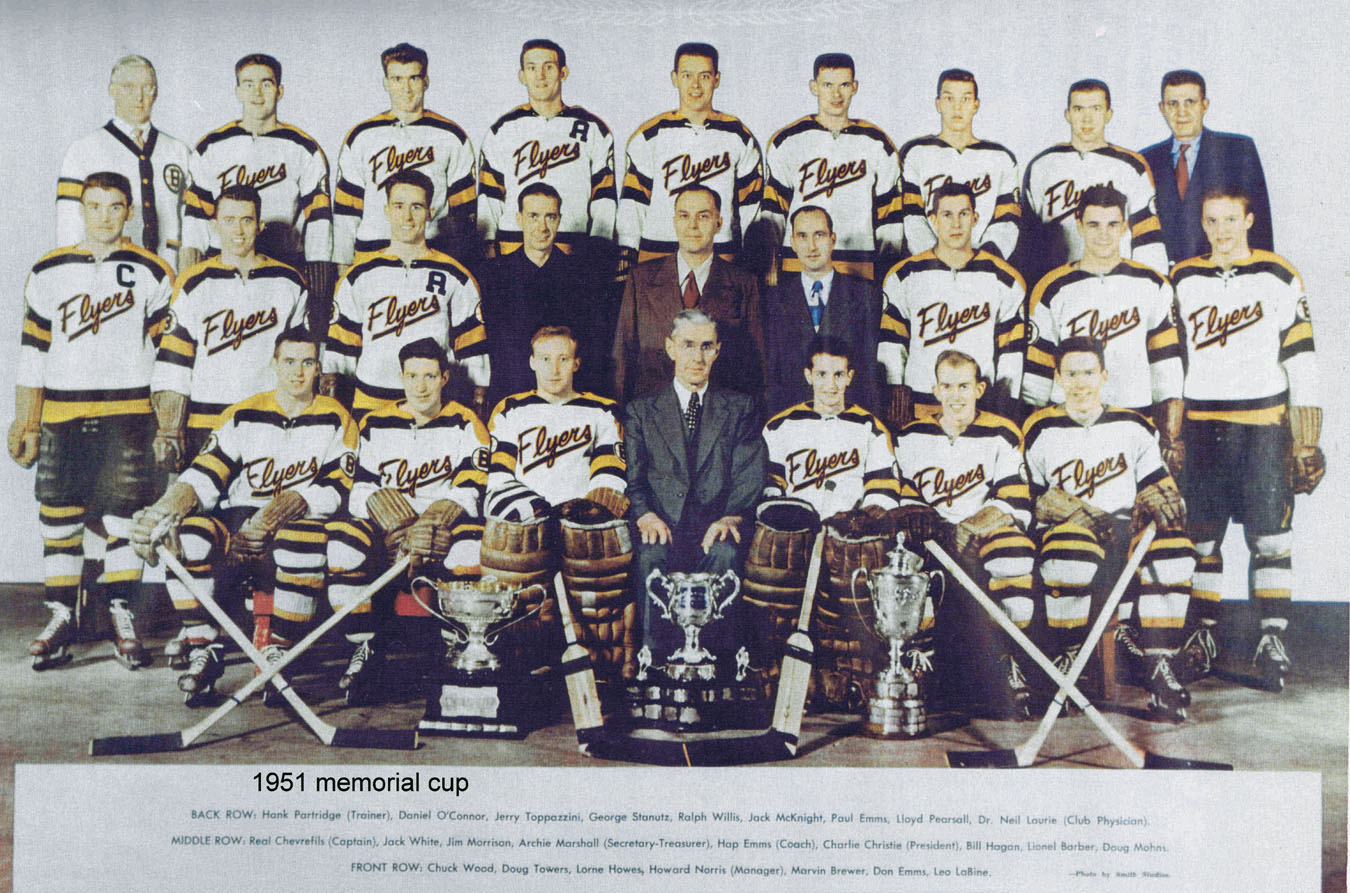
Memorial Cup Winner 1951 Barrie Flyers

Leo Labine began his career as a featured member of the Memorial Cup winning Barrie Flyers, the Boston Bruins OHA affiliate. After a brief spell with the Hershey Bears of the American Hockey League, Labine joined the Bruins near the conclusion of the 1951–52 season, and with his rugged, spectacular style, he quickly established himself as a regular.

In 1955, Labine won the Elizabeth C. Dufresne Trophy, given to the Boston Bruins player voted most outstanding during home games. Labine also led the Bruins in scoring for the 1954–55 season. His best campaigns in Boston were spent on Boston's top power unit with his long-time partner Real Chevrefils and smooth, crafty centre Don McKenney. His fiery, aggressive style fit in well with the Boston Bruins of the 1950s. Labine was traded to the Detroit Red Wings in 1961.

Labine, who retired from hockey in 1967, was also a member of the WHL All-Star Team in 1964 and participated in the NHL All-Star Games of 1955 and 1956. Labine played in a total of 643 NHL games, had 128 goals, and 321 points.

Labine died of cancer at the North Bay General Hospital in North Bay, Ontario, on February 25, 2005, at the age of seventy-three. He is buried in St. Mary's Catholic Cemetery in North Bay.

In 2023, he would be named one of the top 100 Bruins players of all time.

== Career statistics ==
=== Regular season and playoffs ===
			Regular season					Playoffs
Season	Team	League	GP	G	A	Pts	PIM	GP	G	A	Pts	PIM
1949–50	St. Michael's Majors	OHA	47	20	22	42	77	5	1	2	3	13
1950–51	Barrie Flyers	OHA	52	32	46	78	143	12	13	13	26	36
1950–51	Barrie Flyers	M-Cup	—	—	—	—	—	11	12	13	25	36
1951–52	Boston Bruins	NHL	15	2	4	6	9	5	0	1	1	4
1951–52	Hershey Bears	AHL	53	23	23	46	88	5	0	1	1	20
1952–53	Boston Bruins	NHL	51	8	15	23	69	7	2	1	3	19
1952–53	Hershey Bears	AHL	16	7	3	10	33	3	1	2	3	8
1953–54	Boston Bruins	NHL	68	16	19	35	57	4	0	1	1	8
1954–55	Boston Bruins	NHL	67	24	18	42	75	5	2	1	3	11
1955–56	Boston Bruins	NHL	68	16	18	34	104	—	—	—	—	—
1956–57	Boston Bruins	NHL	67	18	29	47	128	10	3	2	5	14
1957–58	Boston Bruins	NHL	62	7	14	21	60	11	0	2	2	10
1958–59	Boston Bruins	NHL	70	9	23	32	74	7	2	1	3	12
1959–60	Boston Bruins	NHL	63	16	28	44	58	—	—	—	—	—
1960–61	Boston Bruins	NHL	40	7	12	19	34	—	—	—	—	—
1960–61	Detroit Red Wings	NHL	24	2	9	11	32	11	3	2	5	4
1961–62	Detroit Red Wings	NHL	48	3	4	7	30	—	—	—	—	—
1961–62	Sudbury Wolves	EPHL	9	10	10	20	18	5	0	4	4	4
1962–63	Los Angeles Blades	WHL	68	30	47	77	90	3	1	0	1	2
1963–64	Los Angeles Blades	WHL	70	31	46	77	56	12	10	12	22	10
1964–65	Los Angeles Blades	WHL	58	16	37	53	42	—	—	—	—	—
1965–66	Los Angeles Blades	WHL	71	33	30	63	33	—	—	—	—	—
1966–67	Los Angeles Blades	WHL	70	18	29	47	24	—	—	—	—	—
WHL totals			337	128	189	317	245	15	11	12	23	12
NHL totals			643	128	193	321	730	60	12	11	23	82
