= Jim Morrison (ice hockey) =

Canadian ice hockey player, coach and scout (1931–2026)

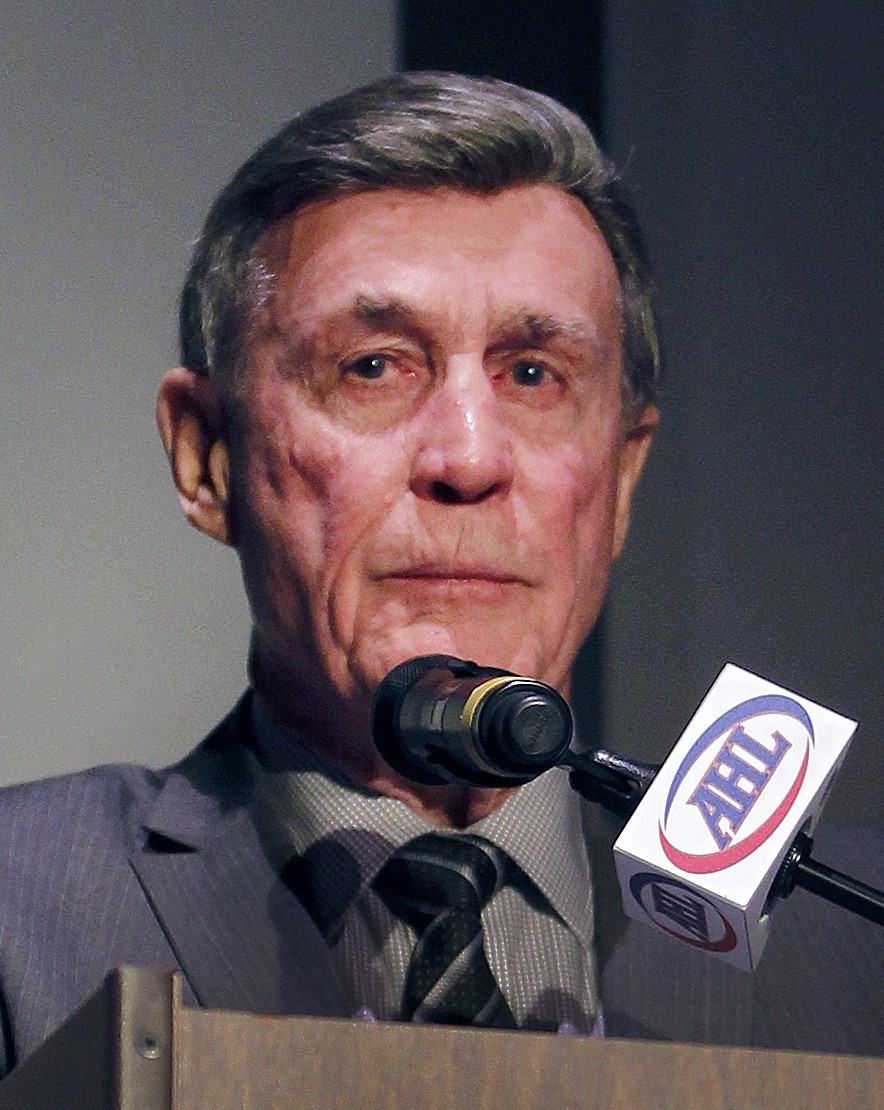
- Morrison in 2013
- Born: October 11, 1931 Montreal, Quebec, Canada
- Died: February 3, 2026 (aged 94)
- Height: 5 ft 10 in (178 cm)
- Weight: 175 lb (79 kg; 12 st 7 lb)
- Position: Defence
- Shot: Left
- Played for: Boston Bruins; Toronto Maple Leafs; Detroit Red Wings; New York Rangers; Pittsburgh Penguins
- Playing career: 1951–1973

James Stewart Hunter Morrison (October 11, 1931 – February 3, 2026) was a Canadian professional ice hockey defenceman, coach and scout. He played in the National Hockey League for the Boston Bruins, Toronto Maple Leafs, Detroit Red Wings, New York Rangers and Pittsburgh Penguins between 1951 and 1961, and again from 1969 to 1971. He also played in the minor American Hockey League during his career, which lasted from 1951 to 1973. Morrison was a fast-skating, offensive-minded defenceman.

== Career ==
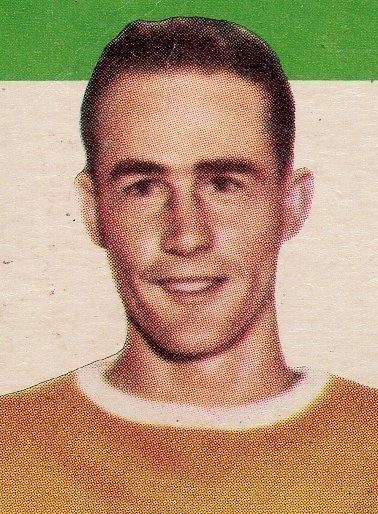
Morrison on a 1959 Topps card

Morrison also played eight seasons with the Quebec Aces and three seasons with the Baltimore Clippers in the American Hockey League. Morrison won the Eddie Shore Award in 1965–66 as the league's outstanding defenceman.

After his retirement, he briefly coached the Kitchener Rangers before moving behind the bench of the Kingston Canadians (later Kingston Frontenacs) for seven seasons. He later served 18 years as a scout in the Bruins organization before being forced into retirement.

== Personal life ==
Dave Morrison, his son, also played in the NHL.

Morrison died on February 3, 2026, at the age of 94.

== Career statistics ==
=== Regular season and playoffs ===
			Regular season					Playoffs
Season	Team	League	GP	G	A	Pts	PIM	GP	G	A	Pts	PIM
1949–50	Verdun Maple Leafs	QJHL	36	15	15	30	16	4	3	1	4	0
1950–51	Barrie Flyers	OHA	53	19	42	61	63	12	3	10	13	14
1950–51	Barrie Flyers	M-Cup	—	—	—	—	—	11	5	7	12	20
1951–52	Hershey Bears	AHL	39	8	25	33	18	—	—	—	—	—
1951–52	Boston Bruins	NHL	14	0	2	2	2	—	—	—	—	—
1951–52	Toronto Maple Leafs	NHL	17	0	1	1	4	2	0	0	0	0
1952–53	Toronto Maple Leafs	NHL	56	1	8	9	36	—	—	—	—	—
1953–54	Toronto Maple Leafs	NHL	60	9	11	20	51	5	0	0	0	4
1954–55	Toronto Maple Leafs	NHL	70	5	12	17	84	4	0	1	1	4
1955–56	Toronto Maple Leafs	NHL	63	2	17	19	77	5	0	0	0	4
1956–57	Toronto Maple Leafs	NHL	63	3	17	20	44	—	—	—	—	—
1957–58	Toronto Maple Leafs	NHL	70	3	21	24	62	—	—	—	—	—
1958–59	Boston Bruins	NHL	70	8	17	25	42	6	0	6	6	16
1959–60	Detroit Red Wings	NHL	70	3	23	26	62	6	0	2	2	0
1960–61	New York Rangers	NHL	19	1	6	7	6	—	—	—	—	—
1960–61	Quebec Aces	AHL	45	9	24	33	61	—	—	—	—	—
1961–62	Quebec Aces	AHL	68	8	28	36	55	—	—	—	—	—
1962–63	Quebec Aces	AHL	51	5	22	27	26	—	—	—	—	—
1963–64	Quebec Aces	AHL	69	11	28	39	42	9	1	0	1	8
1964–65	Quebec Aces	AHL	52	6	21	27	66	4	0	0	0	0
1965–66	Quebec Aces	AHL	71	11	48	59	78	6	2	3	5	8
1966–67	Quebec Aces	AHL	70	5	45	50	37	5	1	4	5	12
1967–68	Quebec Aces	AHL	58	4	35	39	30	15	4	12	16	14
1968–69	Baltimore Clippers	AHL	65	5	32	37	35	4	2	1	3	10
1969–70	Pittsburgh Penguins	NHL	59	5	15	20	40	8	0	3	3	10
1970–71	Pittsburgh Penguins	NHL	73	0	10	10	32	—	—	—	—	—
1971–72	Baltimore Clippers	AHL	68	8	22	30	62	18	2	7	9	14
1972–73	Baltimore Clippers	AHL	65	5	11	16	46	—	—	—	—	—
AHL totals			721	85	341	426	556	61	12	27	39	66
NHL totals			704	40	160	200	542	36	0	12	12	38
