= Orval Tessier =

Canadian ice hockey player and coach (1933–2022)

- Born: June 30, 1933 Cornwall, Ontario, Canada
- Died: August 25, 2022 (aged 89) Cornwall, Ontario, Canada
- Height: 5 ft 8 in (173 cm)
- Weight: 178 lb (81 kg; 12 st 10 lb)
- Position: Center
- Shot: Left
- Played for: Montreal Canadiens; Boston Bruins; Portland Buckaroos; Clinton Comets; Quebec Aces; Springfield Indians; Hershey Bears
- Playing career: 1953–1965
- Coaching career: 1971–1985

Orval Roy Tessier (June 30, 1933 – August 25, 2022) was a Canadian professional ice hockey centre and coach who played parts of three seasons in the National Hockey League for the Montreal Canadiens and Boston Bruins between 1954 and 1960, appearing in a total of 59 regular season games. The rest of his career, which lasted from 1953 to 1965, was spent in the minor leagues, where he was a solid offensive player. He won two scoring titles with the Eastern Professional Hockey League's Kingston Frontenacs, and was voted the league's most valuable player and most sportsmanlike player in the 1961–62 season.

After playing, Tessier had a successful coaching career. In junior ice hockey, Tessier coached the Cornwall Royals to Memorial Cup victory in 1972. Tessier coached the 1981 Memorial Cup finalists, the Kitchener Rangers. The next season, Tessier was hired to coach the New Brunswick Hawks in the American Hockey League. He led the Hawks to a Calder Cup victory in 1982. Tessier was promoted, and named head coach of the Chicago Blackhawks, which lasted for three seasons. In 1983 Tessier won the Jack Adams Award as the best coach in the NHL.

During the 1983 Campbell Conference Final, Tessier was quoted as saying that the Blackhawks players needed "heart transplants" after giving up 16 goals in the first two games of the series against the Edmonton Oilers, and trailing in the series 2 games to 0. The quip failed to inspire the Hawks, who dropped the final two games of the series at Chicago Stadium, marking the second consecutive year Chicago lost in the Campbell Conference final.

Tessier won the Stanley Cup in 2001 with the Colorado Avalanche while serving as a scout for the team. He died on August 25, 2022, in his hometown of Cornwall, Ontario.

== Career statistics ==
=== Regular season and playoffs ===
| | | | Regular season | | | | | Playoffs |
| Season | Team | League | GP | G | A | Pts | PIM | GP | G | A | Pts | PIM |
|---|---|---|---|---|---|---|---|---|---|---|---|---|
| 1951–52 | Kitchener Greenshirts | OHA | 52 | 62 | 25 | 87 | 18 | 4 | 3 | 1 | 4 | 8 |
| 1952–53 | Kitchener Greenshirts | OHA | 55 | 54 | 40 | 94 | 19 | 15 | 7 | 13 | 20 | 12 |
| 1952–53 | Barrie Flyers | M-Cup | — | — | — | — | — | 10 | 10 | 18 | 28 | 14 |
| 1953–54 | Montreal Royals | QHL | 60 | 21 | 18 | 39 | 13 | 9 | 2 | 1 | 3 | 6 |
| 1954–55 | Montreal Canadiens | NHL | 4 | 0 | 0 | 0 | 0 | — | — | — | — | — |
| 1954–55 | Montreal Royals | QHL | 60 | 36 | 30 | 66 | 8 | 12 | 4 | 7 | 11 | 0 |
| 1955–56 | Boston Bruins | NHL | 23 | 2 | 3 | 5 | 6 | — | — | — | — | — |
| 1955–56 | Hershey Bears | AHL | 2 | 0 | 1 | 1 | 0 | — | — | — | — | — |
| 1955–56 | Quebec Aces | QHL | 28 | 5 | 10 | 15 | 4 | 7 | 1 | 2 | 3 | 2 |
| 1956–57 | Quebec Aces | QHL | 68 | 43 | 38 | 81 | 24 | 10 | 7 | 5 | 12 | 0 |
| 1957–58 | Springfield Indians | AHL | 12 | 5 | 3 | 8 | 2 | — | — | — | — | — |
| 1958–59 | Trois-Rivières Lions | QHL | 62 | 27 | 39 | 66 | 4 | 8 | 2 | 3 | 5 | 9 |
| 1959–60 | Kingston Frontenacs | EPHL | 70 | 59 | 67 | 126 | 10 | — | — | — | — | — |
| 1960–61 | Boston Bruins | NHL | 32 | 3 | 4 | 7 | 0 | — | — | — | — | — |
| 1960–61 | Kingston Frontenacs | EPHL | 34 | 22 | 21 | 43 | 6 | 5 | 4 | 2 | 6 | 0 |
| 1961–62 | Kingston Frontenacs | EPHL | 66 | 54 | 60 | 114 | 12 | 11 | 5 | 9 | 14 | 0 |
| 1962–63 | Portland Buckaroos | WHL | 36 | 15 | 21 | 36 | 9 | 7 | 0 | 0 | 0 | 0 |
| 1963–64 | Portland Buckaroos | WHL | 66 | 14 | 34 | 48 | 4 | 5 | 1 | 2 | 3 | 0 |
| 1964–65 | Clinton Comets | EHL | 66 | 60 | 58 | 118 | 42 | 11 | 2 | 7 | 9 | 0 |
| QHL totals | | | 278 | 132 | 135 | 267 | 53 | 46 | 16 | 18 | 34 | 17 |
| NHL totals | | | 59 | 5 | 7 | 12 | 6 | — | — | — | — | — |

== Coaching record ==
=== National Hockey League ===
| Team | Year | Regular season | | | | | | Postseason | | | | | |
| Team | Year | G | W | L | T | Pts | Division rank | Result | | | | | |
|---|---|---|---|---|---|---|---|---|---|---|---|---|---|
| CHI | 1982–83 | 80 | 47 | 23 | 10 | 104 | 1st in Norris | Won in division semi-finals (3-1 vs. STL); Won in division finals (4-1 vs. MIN); Lost in Conference Final (0-4 vs. EDM) | | | | | |
| CHI | 1983–84 | 80 | 30 | 42 | 8 | 68 | 4th in Norris | Lost in division sem-finals (2-3 vs. MIN) | | | | | |
| 53 | 22 | 28 | 3 | 47 | 2nd in Norris | Fired | 53 | 22 | 28 | 3 | 47 | second in Norris | Fired |
| Total | | 213 | 99 | 93 | 21 | 219 | 1 division title | 0 Stanley Cups (9-9, 0.500) | | | | | |

=== American Hockey League ===
| Team | Year | Regular season | | | | | | Postseason |
| Team | Year | G | W | L | T | Pts | Division rank | Result |
|---|---|---|---|---|---|---|---|---|
| NB | 1981–82 | 80 | 48 | 21 | 11 | 107 | 1st in North | Won in division semi-finals (3-2 vs. ADI); Won in division finals (4-1 vs. NS); Won Calder Cup (4-1 vs. BNG) |
| Total | | 80 | 48 | 21 | 11 | 107 | | 1 Calder Cup (11-4, 0.733) |

=== Junior hockey ===
==== QMJHL ====
| Team | Year | Regular season | | | | | | Postseason |
| Team | Year | G | W | L | T | Pts | Division rank | Result |
|---|---|---|---|---|---|---|---|---|
| COR | 1971–72 | 62 | 47 | 13 | 2 | 96 | 1st in QMJHL | Won in quarter-finals (8-0 vs. VER); Won in semi-finals (8-2 vs. SHA); Won President's Cup (9-5 vs. QUE); Finished 2nd in round-robin at Memorial Cup (1-1); Won Memorial Cup (2-1 vs. PBO) |
| QUE | 1972–73 | 64 | 49 | 11 | 4 | 102 | 1st in QMJHL | Won in quarter-finals (4-0 vs. TR); Won in semi-finals (4-0 vs. SHE); Won President's Cup (4-3 vs. COR); Finished 2nd in round-robin at Memorial Cup (1-1); Lost Memorial Cup (1-9 vs. TOR) |
| COR | 1974–75 | 72 | 36 | 24 | 12 | 84 | 3rd in West | Lost in quarter-finals (0-4 vs. MTL) |
| COR | 1975–76 | 72 | 39 | 24 | 9 | 87 | 2nd in West | Won in quarter-finals (4-2 vs. MTL); Lost in semi-finals (0-4 vs. QUE) |
| COR | 1976–77 | 72 | 38 | 24 | 10 | 86 | 2nd in Lebel | Won in quarter-finals (8-4 vs. TR); Lost in semi-finals (1-9 vs. SHE) |
| COR | 1977–78 | 72 | 46 | 18 | 8 | 100 | 1st in Lebel | Won in quarter-finals (8-0 vs. HUL); Lost in semi-finals (2-8 vs. MTL) |
| CHI | 1978–79 | 72 | 26 | 36 | 10 | 62 | 4th in Dilio | Lost in quarter-finals (0-4 vs. SHE) |
| CHI | 1979–80 | 72 | 42 | 27 | 3 | 87 | 2nd in Dilio | Won in quarter-finals (4-3 vs. TR); Lost in semi-finals (1-4 vs. COR) |
| COR Totals | | 350 | 206 | 103 | 41 | 453 | | 1 President's Cup (25-23-2, 0.520) 1 Memorial Cup (2-1, 0.667) |
| CHI Totals | | 144 | 68 | 63 | 13 | 149 | | 0 President's Cups (5-11, 0.313) |
| QUE Totals | | 64 | 49 | 11 | 4 | 102 | | 1 President's Cup (12-3, 0.800) 0 Memorial Cups (1-2, 0.333) |
| QMJHL Totals | | 558 | 323 | 177 | 58 | 704 | | 2 President's Cups (42-37-2, 0.551) 1 Memorial Cup (3-3, 0.500) |

==== OHL ====
| Team | Year | Regular season | | | | | | Postseason |
| Team | Year | G | W | L | T | Pts | Division rank | Result |
|---|---|---|---|---|---|---|---|---|
| KIT | 1980–81 | 68 | 34 | 33 | 1 | 69 | 1st in Emms | Won in division semi-finals (9-5 vs. NF); Won in division finals (9-1 vs. WSR); Won J. Ross Robertson Cup (9-3 vs. SSM); Finished 2nd in round-robin at Memorial Cup (2-2); Lost Memorial Cup (2-8 vs. COR) |
| COR | 1986–87 | 66 | 23 | 40 | 3 | 49 | 6th in Leyden | Lost in division quarter-finals (1-4 vs. OTT) |
| COR | 1987–88 | 66 | 35 | 24 | 7 | 77 | 3rd in Leyden | Won in division quarter-finals (4-2 vs. BEL); Lost in division semi-finals (1-4 vs. OTT) |
| COR | 1988–89 | 66 | 31 | 30 | 5 | 67 | 4th in Leyden | Won in division quarter-finals (4-2 vs. TOR); Won in division semi-finals (4-2 vs. OTT); Lost in division finals (2-4 vs. PBO) |
| COR Totals | | 198 | 89 | 94 | 15 | 193 | | 0 J. Ross Robertson Cups (16-18, 0.471) |
| KIT Totals | | 68 | 34 | 33 | 1 | 69 | | 1 J. Ross Robertson Cup (11-2-5, 0.750) 0 Memorial Cups (2-3, 0.400) |
| OHL Totals | | 266 | 123 | 127 | 16 | 262 | | 1 J. Ross Robertson Cup (27-20-5, 0.567) 0 Memorial Cups (2-3, 0.400) |

== Awards and achievements ==
- 1961–62 - Most valuable player & Sportsmanship award (Kingston Frontenacs)
- 1982–83 - Jack Adams Award (Chicago Blackhawks)

| Preceded by Tom Watt | Winner of the Jack Adams Award; 1983 | Succeeded by Bryan Murray |
| Preceded by Bob Pulford | Head coach of the Chicago Black Hawks; 1982-85 | Succeeded by Bob Pulford |
