= Barrie Flyers =

Canadian junior ice hockey team (1945–1960)

- City: Barrie, Ontario
- League: Ontario Hockey Association
- Operated: 1945–1960
- Home arena: Barrie Arena
- Colours: White, black and gold
- Parent club: Boston Bruins

Franchise history
- 1945–1960: Barrie Flyers
- 1960–1972: Niagara Falls Flyers
- 1972–present: Sudbury Wolves

Championships
- Playoff championships: 1951 Memorial Cup; 1953 Memorial Cup

The Barrie Flyers were a Canadian junior ice hockey team in the Ontario Hockey Association (OHA) from 1945 to 1960. Based in Barrie, Ontario, the Flyers played home games at the Barrie Arena. The team was operated by Hap Emms as a farm team of the Boston Bruins, won the J. Ross Robertson Cup four times as OHA champions, and won the Memorial Cup as junior champions of Canada in 1951 and 1953.

== History ==
The Barrie Flyers joined the Ontario Hockey Association (OHA) junior A division for the 1945–46 OHA season. The Flyers were owned and managed by Hap Emms, and were established as a farm team to the St. Louis Flyers of the American Hockey League.

By the 1947–48 season, the Flyers has become a farm team for the Boston Bruins. Barrie defeated the Windsor Spitfires for the J. Ross Robertson Cup. Barrie then defeated the Montreal Nationales to win the George Richardson Memorial Trophy as Eastern Canadian champions. In the 1948 Memorial Cup, the Flyers lost to the Port Arthur West End Bruins in a best-of-seven series played at Maple Leaf Gardens. The series was very physical and bitter between the teams. After the third game, Emms threatened that the Flyers would not continue to play without a change in referees. The series ultimately continued with the same referees.

In the 1948–49 season, Barrie won the OHA championship versus the Toronto Marlboros, then lost to the Montreal Royals in the Eastern Canada final. Despite having won the OHA championship, Emms felt that operating the team in Barrie was not financially viable with renovations to their arena to increase capacity from 2,700 to 5,000.

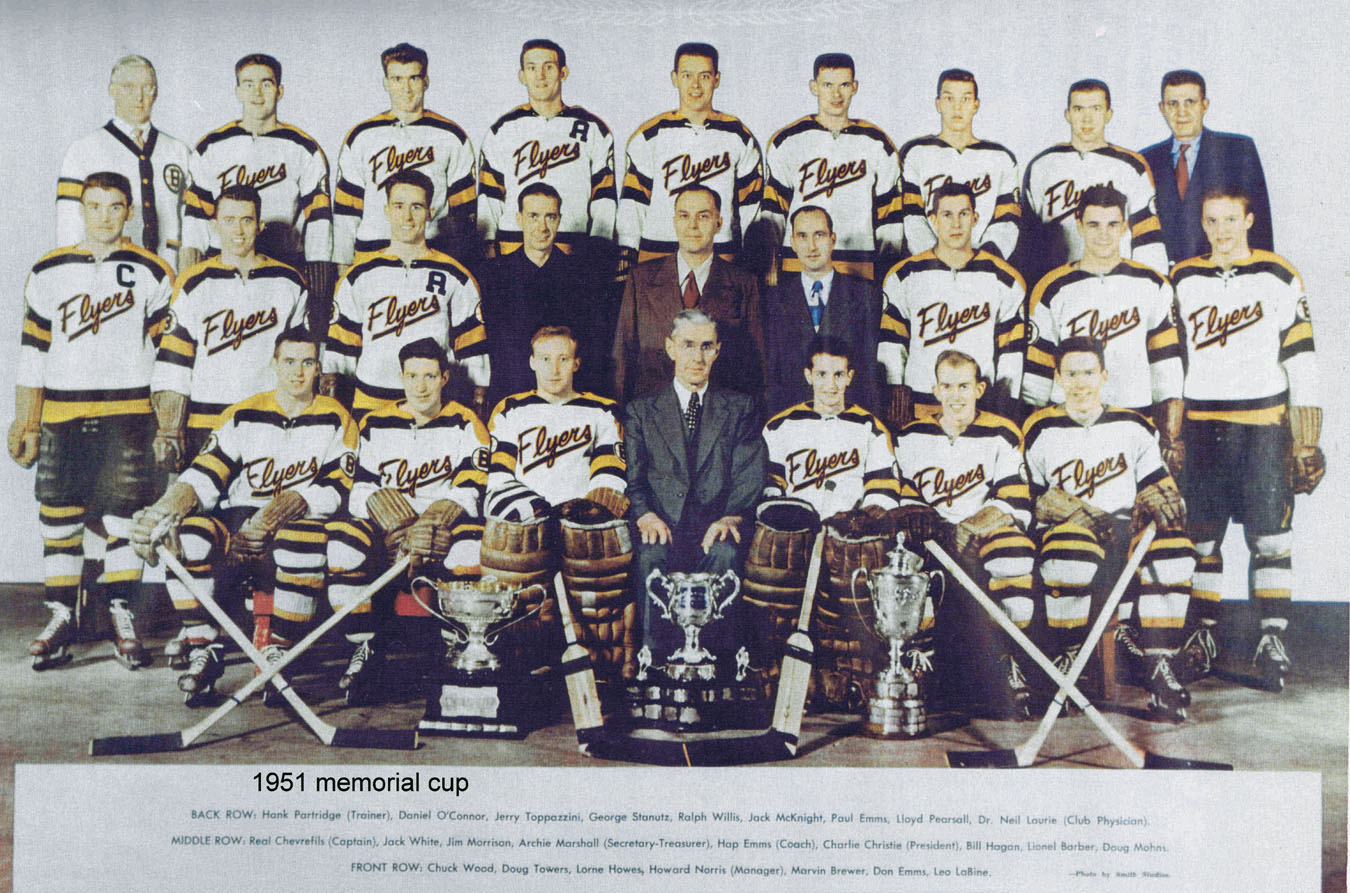
1951 Barrie Flyers

In the 1950–51 season, the Bruins established a second farm team in the Waterloo Hurricanes, but gave priority to the Barrie Flyers for receiving prospects. Barrie won the OHA championship again versus the Toronto Marlboros. Canadian Amateur Hockey Association vice-president W. B. George oversaw the Flyers versus Quebec Citadelles series for the George Richardson Memorial Trophy, to represent Eastern Canada in the 1951 Memorial Cup playoffs. When the Citadels refused to play game five in Barrie, George gave them an ultimatum to play or forfeit the series. Quebec decided to play too late to arrive by train, but arrived half an hour late after flying. George scheduled game seven on neutral ice at Maple Leaf Gardens, despite protests from Flyers' coach Hap Emms who claimed that his team only agreed to resume the series if game seven was played in Barrie. The Flyers won the 1951 Memorial Cup played at Winnipeg and Brandon, Manitoba. They swept the Winnipeg Monarchs in a best-of-seven series.

In the 1952–53 season, Barrie won the OHA championship versus the Toronto St. Michael's Majors. The Flyers won the 1953 Memorial Cup in 1953 played at Winnipeg and Brandon, Manitoba, defeating the St. Boniface Canadiens in a best-of-seven series.

In 1955, the Flyers received five Boston Bruins' prospect players from the defunct Galt Black Hawks. In the 1955–56 season, Barrie reached the OHA finals and lost to the Toronto Marlboros.

In 1960, the Flyers relocated to Niagara Falls, Ontario. Emms stated that it was financially impossible to operate in Barrie and that the arena's new roof would not be ready for the next season. During the 1959–60 season, the Flyers had an average attendance of 1,400 fans per game. Emms previously considered relocating the team to North Bay, Ontario, but opted for Niagara Falls based on prospective attendance figures and a larger population nearby.

== Players ==
=== Award winners ===
- 1948–49 – Gilles Mayer received the Red Tilson Trophy as the OHA's most outstanding junior player.
- 1950–51 – Don Lockhart and Lorne Howes received the Dave Pinkney Trophy with the lowest goals against average for goaltenders on n OHA junior team.

=== Notable alumni ===
List of Flyers' alumni who played in the National Hockey League (NHL) or World Hockey Association:

- Barry Ashbee
- Blake Ball
- Bob Barlow
- Bob Beckett
- Bob Blackburn
- Ross Brooks
- Kelly Burnett
- Dick Cherry
- Don Cherry
- Real Chevrefils
- Murray Davison
- Marv Edwards
- Pierre Gagne
- Ray Gariepy
- Jeannot Gilbert
- Howie Glover
- Bill Knibbs
- Leo Labine
- Stan Long
- Wayne Maxner
- Gilles Mayer
- Don McKenney
- Sid McNabney
- Paul Meger
- Hillary Menard
- Doug Mohns
- Jim Morrison
- Keke Mortson
- Tony Poeta
- Dan Poliziani
- George Ranieri
- Gerry Reid
- Dale Rolfe
- Wayne Rutledge
- Myron Stankiewicz
- Ron Stewart
- Alan Teal
- Orval Tessier
- Jerry Toppazzini
- Ed Westfall
- Larry Zeidel

== Season-by-season results ==
Regular season and playoffs results:

Legend: GP = Games played, W = Wins, L = Losses, T = Ties, Pts = Points, GF = Goals for, GA = Goals against

Memorial Cup champions	Memorial Cup finalists	League champions	League finalists

Season	Regular season									Playoffs
Season	GP	W	L	T	Pts	Pct	GF	GA	Finish	Playoffs
1945–46	28	8	18	2	18	0.308	89	171	7th OHA	Did not qualify
1946–47	35	17	16	2	36	0.514	129	144	6th OHA	Won quarterfinal (Toronto Marlboros) 2–0; Lost semifinal (Galt Red Wings) 2–1
1947–48	36	23	13	0	46	0.639	198	116	3rd OHA	Won quarterfinal (Stratford Kroehlers) 2–0; Won semifinal (Galt Rockets) 3–2; Won OHA final (Windsor Spitfires) 4–2; Won Eastern Canada semifinal (Porcupine Combines) 3–0; Won Eastern Canada final (Montreal Nationales) 3–0; Lost 1948 Memorial Cup final (Port Arthur West End Bruins) 4–0
1948–49	48	28	16	4	60	0.625	208	134	2nd OHA	Won semifinal (Windsor Spitfires) 4–0; Won OHA final (Toronto Marlboros) 4–0; Won Eastern Canada semifinal (Porcupine Combines) 4–0; Lost Eastern Canada final (Montreal Junior Royals) 4–0
1949–50	48	21	24	3	45	0.469	180	217	5th OHA	Won quarterfinal (Toronto St. Michael's Majors) 3–2; Lost semifinal (Guelph Biltmores) 3–1
1950–51	54	38	14	2	78	0.722	276	161	1st OHA	Won quarterfinal (Galt Black Hawks) 3–0; Won semifinal (Windsor Spitfires) 3–0; Won OHA final (Toronto Marlboros) 4–2; Won Eastern Canada final (Quebec Citadelles) 4–3; Won 1951 Memorial Cup final (Winnipeg Monarchs) 4–0
1951–52	53	22	30	1	47	0.425	225	230	7th OHA	Did not qualify
1952–53	56	37	17	2	76	0.679	258	187	1st OHA	Won semifinal (Toronto Marlboros) 5–2; Won OHA final (Toronto St. Michael's Majors) 5–3; Won Eastern Canada final (Quebec Citadelles) 4–1; Won 1953 Memorial Cup final (St. Boniface Canadiens) 4–1
1953–54	59	25	33	1	51	0.432	260	285	7th OHA	Did not qualify
1954–55	49	18	31	0	36	0.367	169	251	7th OHA	Did not qualify
1955–56	48	20	25	3	43	0.448	179	207	6th OHA	Won quarterfinal (Kitchener Canucks) 4–3–1; Won semifinal (Toronto St. Michael's Majors) 3–2; Lost OHA final (Toronto Marlboros) 4–1
1956–57	52	13	37	2	28	0.269	147	218	6th OHA	Lost quarterfinal (St. Catharines Teepees) 3–0
1957–58	51	18	29	4	40	0.392	201	234	6th OHA	Lost quarterfinal (Toronto St. Michael's Majors) 3–1
1958–59	54	21	27	6	48	0.444	178	192	5th OHA	Lost quarterfinal (Peterborough Petes) 4–2
1959–60	48	24	18	6	54	0.562	19	172	3rd OHA	Lost quarterfinal (Peterborough Petes) 3–1–2

== Sources ==
- Lapp, Richard M.; Macaulay, Alec (1997). The Memorial Cup: Canada's National Junior Hockey Championship. Madeira Park, British Columbia: Harbour Publishing. ISBN 1-55017-170-4.
