= Réal Chevrefils =

Canadian ice hockey player

- Born: May 2, 1932 Timmins, Ontario, Canada
- Died: January 8, 1981 (aged 48) Windsor, Ontario, Canada
- Height: 5 ft 10 in (178 cm)
- Weight: 180 lb (82 kg; 12 st 12 lb)
- Position: Left wing
- Shot: Left
- Played for: Boston Bruins; Detroit Red Wings
- Playing career: 1951–1964

Joseph Maurice Roger Réal "Chevy" Chevrefils (May 2, 1932 – January 8, 1981) was a Canadian ice hockey forward. He played in the National Hockey League with the Boston Bruins and Detroit Red Wings between 1951 and 1959.

== Playing career ==
Chevrefils was a member of the 1951 Memorial Cup champion Barrie Flyers. His stats for the OHA regular season in 1950-51 were 54 games played, 52 goals, 51 assists, for 103 total points. He was ranked as the second best junior hockey player in Canada, behind Jean Béliveau of the Quebec Citadelles. His brother, Maurice, a one-time player with the Johnstown Jets from the International Hockey League, played with the Barrie Flyers as well.

When Chevrefils became a professional, his career was affected by alcohol. His first experiences with alcohol came while playing for the Hershey Bears in 1951. While in Hershey, Chevrefils notched 20 goals and 28 assists for 48 points in just 34 games. Chevrefils started his National Hockey League (NHL) career with the Boston Bruins in 1951 too.

Chevrefils scored his first NHL goal at Chicago Stadium on February 17, 1952 in the first period of Boston's 5-2 victory. He notched his second gal in the same game.

Bruins’ teammates such as Leo Labine, who had also played with Chevrefils on the Barrie Flyers, mentioned that Chevrefils would be hung over in the dressing room. According to Lou Bendo, who played on Chevrefils’s last team, the 1963 Allan Cup winning Windsor Bulldogs, the Bruins organization felt Chevy was too small at 170 pounds and asked him to bulk up by having a few beers with supper.

Despite the drinking issues, Chevrefils was also known for a sense of humour. In the 1951 Memorial Cup playoffs against the Quebec Citadelles, Jean Béliveau shot the puck so hard that it went through the net. The officials did not see it, and Chevrefils skated up to Beliveau and said, “Hey, big Jean, don’t shoot so hard next time.”

In 1955, Lynn Patrick, who had succeeded Art Ross as General Manager of the Boston Bruins predicted that Chevrefils "...will be an all-star within three years, and within five years, he’ll be one of the best left wings ever to play in the league." In 1955, the Bruins traded him to the Detroit Red Wings, after being part of the trade for Terry Sawchuk.

Jack Adams, the Detroit General Manager tried to get Chevrefils to go to Alcoholics Anonymous. Reports indicated that Adams hired private detectives to keep tabs on Chevrefils. Out of frustration, Adams traded Chevrefils back to Boston in January 1956.

Chevrefils played only one full, injury free season in 1956–57. He had scored 31 goals, was selected to play in the All-Star Game and was named to the NHL Second All-Star Team. Over the next 2 seasons, Chevrefils only scored 10 goals, and by his 27th birthday, was out of the NHL. In the end, he had scored 104 goals in 387 regular season games, which were spread over parts of 8 seasons (1951–52 to 1958–59) and scored 5 more goals in 30 playoff games.

Chevrefils was married to Claudette Roy, but the two had a troubled relationship. This was exemplified when Chevrefils played for the Los Angeles Blades with childhood friend, Danny Belisle. The team owners flew out Claudette to look after Chevy. The result was that the two of them would drink and fight. Eventually, the two separated in 1962; they had six children.

In later years, Chevrefils lived in Windsor and had qualified for an NHL pension worth $130 a month but received an extra $200 a month from a special fund for needy ex-players, courtesy of Jimmy Skinner, an executive with the Detroit Red Wings. A lot of his time was spent at Windsor’s Downtown Mission. He would shovel snow with other men for less than a dollar an hour.

Chevrefils died on January 8, 1981, at Windsor’s Hotel-Dieu Hospital. At the funeral, six of his pallbearers were former teammates with the Windsor Bulldogs, including Lou Bendo and Jack Costello, who was on a hockey tour of Europe with Chevrefils. On his grave, a small stone lies flat and reads: "Chevy, number 12, May 2, 1932-January 8, 1981". On an upper corner is the Boston Bruins emblem.

== Career statistics ==
=== Regular season and playoffs ===
			Regular season					Playoffs
Season	Team	League	GP	G	A	Pts	PIM	GP	G	A	Pts	PIM
1948–49	Barrie Flyers	OHA	43	13	13	26	36	8	6	7	13	16
1948–49	Barrie Flyers	M-Cup	—	—	—	—	—	7	8	2	10	8
1949–50	Barrie Flyers	OHA	48	27	32	59	95	9	6	7	13	16
1950–51	Barrie Flyers	OHA	54	52	51	103	104	12	14	11	25	16
1950–51	Barrie Flyers	M-Cup	—	—	—	—	—	11	9	10	19	14
1951–52	Boston Bruins	NHL	33	8	17	25	8	7	1	1	2	6
1951–52	Hershey Bears	AHL	34	20	28	48	14	—	—	—	—	—
1952–53	Boston Bruins	NHL	69	19	14	33	44	7	0	1	1	6
1953–54	Boston Bruins	NHL	14	4	1	5	2	—	—	—	—	—
1954–55	Boston Bruins	NHL	64	18	22	40	30	5	2	1	3	4
1955–56	Detroit Red Wings	NHL	38	3	4	7	24	—	—	—	—	—
1955–56	Boston Bruins	NHL	25	11	8	19	10	—	—	—	—	—
1956–57	Boston Bruins	NHL	70	31	17	48	38	10	2	1	3	4
1957–58	Boston Bruins	NHL	44	9	9	18	21	1	0	0	0	0
1957–58	Springfield Indians	AHL	15	7	8	15	0	11	0	3	3	2
1958–59	Boston Bruins	NHL	30	1	5	6	8	—	—	—	—	—
1958–59	Providence Reds	AHL	6	1	1	2	0	—	—	—	—	—
1958–59	Quebec Aces	QHL	12	2	7	9	6	—	—	—	—	—
1959–60	Sudbury Wolves	EPHL	65	23	36	59	26	14	6	6	12	4
1960–61	Kingston Frontenacs	EPHL	37	16	20	36	16	—	—	—	—	—
1960–61	Winnipeg Warriors	WHL	19	6	7	13	2	—	—	—	—	—
1961–62	Los Angeles Blades	WHL	69	22	32	54	12	—	—	—	—	—
1962–63	San Francisco Seals	WHL	6	1	1	2	0	—	—	—	—	—
1962–63	Windsor Bulldogs	OHA Sr	42	25	48	73	18	—	—	—	—	—
1962–63	Windsor Bulldogs	Al-Cup	—	—	—	—	—	9	4	7	11	2
1963–64	Windsor Bulldogs	IHL	48	19	22	41	8	6	2	2	4	2
NHL totals			387	104	97	201	185	30	5	4	9	20
