= 1948 Memorial Cup =

Canadian junior ice hockey championship

The Memorial Cup trophy

The 1948 Memorial Cup final was the 30th junior ice hockey championship of the Canadian Amateur Hockey Association (CAHA). The George Richardson Memorial Trophy champions Barrie Flyers of the Ontario Hockey Association in Eastern Canada competed against the Abbott Cup champions Port Arthur West End Bruins of the Thunder Bay Junior Hockey League in Western Canada. In a best-of-seven series, held at Maple Leaf Gardens in Toronto, Ontario, Port Arthur won their 1st Memorial Cup, defeating Barrie 4 games to 0.

== Leadup and finals ==
CAHA president Al Pickard oversaw the playoffs in Western Canada. He supported a resolution where any radio station which broadcast a team's games during the regular season would not pay a premium for the additional playoffs games, and the appointment of Foster Hewitt as the national radio commissioner. Pickard did not want to grant exclusive radio broadcast rights to any station, and the CAHA decided that only out-of-town radio stations would pay a broadcast fee for final games in the Allan Cup and Memorial Cup.

The Western Canada playoffs during 1948 did not include any teams from the British Columbia Amateur Hockey Association. CAHA vice-president Doug Grimston attributed the lack of interest to the difficulty of teams from British Columbia to be competitive.

Pickard scheduled the seventh game of the Western Canada junior final at Maple Leaf Gardens in Toronto, where the finals were also scheduled. CAHA by-laws at the time stated that a seventh game be played at a neutral site and the Winnipeg Amphitheatre was unavailable. The decision was criticized in Western Canada, and the Winnipeg Free Press charged that the CAHA was "doing anything for a profit". Pickard responded that any money collected by the CAHA was contributed to the "good of hockey in Canada", and that approximately $78,000 of its annual $100,000 intake was reinvested into future development and covered travel expenses for teams during Allan Cup and Memorial Cup play.

After game three of the final, Flyers' coach Hap Emms threatened that his team would not play the fourth game without a change of referees. Pickard declined to change the referees and the Bruins won the series in the fourth game. Pickard suspended Flyers' player Alf Guarda two years for striking referee Vic Lindquist during game four, and condemned the behaviour of Emms and the team's failure to respect on-ice officials.

== Scores ==
- Game 1: Port Arthur 10-8 Barrie
- Game 2: Port Arthur 8-1 Barrie
- Game 3: Port Arthur 5-4 Barrie
- Game 4: Port Arthur 9-8 Barrie

== Winning roster ==
Fred Baccari, Barton Bradley, Lorne Chabot Jr., Alfie Childs, Dave Creighton, Pete Durham, Bobby Fero, Bert Fonso, Allan Forslund, Art Harris, Bill Johnson, Danny Lewicki, Rudy Migay, Norval Olsen, Benny Woit, Robbie Wrightsell, Jerry Zager. Coach: Ed Lauzon
