= 1953–54 Boston Bruins season =

NHL team season

1953–54 Boston Bruins
- League: 4th NHL
- 1953–54 record: 32–28–10
- Home record: 22–8–5
- Road record: 10–20–5
- Goals for: 177
- Goals against: 181

Team information
- General manager: Art Ross
- Coach: Lynn Patrick
- Captain: Milt Schmidt
- Arena: Boston Garden

Team leaders
- Goals: Johnny Peirson (21)
- Assists: Fleming MacKell (31)
- Points: Ed Sandford (47); Fleming MacKell (47)
- Penalty minutes: Bob Armstrong (81)
- Wins: Jim Henry (32)
- Goals against average: Jim Henry (2.59)

The 1953–54 Boston Bruins season was the Bruins' 30th season in the NHL.

== Regular season ==
=== Final standings ===
National Hockey League
		GP	W	L	T	GF	GA	DIFF	Pts
1	Detroit Red Wings	70	37	19	14	191	132	+59	88
2	Montreal Canadiens	70	35	24	11	195	141	+54	81
3	Toronto Maple Leafs	70	32	24	14	152	131	+21	78
4	Boston Bruins	70	32	28	10	177	181	−4	74
5	New York Rangers	70	29	31	10	161	182	−21	68
6	Chicago Black Hawks	70	12	51	7	133	242	−109	31

=== Record vs. opponents ===
1953–54 NHL Records
Team	BOS	CHI	DET	MTL	NYR	TOR
Boston	—	11–1–2	3–8–3	4–6–4	7–7	7–6–1
Chicago	1–11–2	—	2–11–1	3–9–2	3–9–2	3–11
Detroit	8–3–3	11–2–1	—	6–6–2	6–5–3	6–3–5
Montreal	6–4–4	9–3–2	6–6–2	—	9–5	5–6–3
New York	7–7	9–3–2	5–6–3	5–9	—	3–6–5
Toronto	6–7–1	11–3	3–6–5	6–5–3	6–3–5	—

== Schedule and results ==
1953–54 regular season
October

Game	Result	Date	Score	Opponent	Record
1	W	October 11, 1953	4–1	Montreal Canadiens (1953–54)	1–0–0
2	L	October 15, 1953	1–4	Toronto Maple Leafs (1953–54)	1–1–0
3	L	October 17, 1953	2–5	@ Montreal Canadiens (1953–54)	1–2–0
4	W	October 18, 1953	3–2	New York Rangers (1953–54)	2–2–0
5	L	October 22, 1953	3–4	@ New York Rangers (1953–54)	2–3–0
6	W	October 24, 1953	3–2	@ Toronto Maple Leafs (1953–54)	3–3–0
7	W	October 25, 1953	4–3	@ Chicago Black Hawks (1953–54)	4–3–0
8	W	October 31, 1953	3–1	@ Detroit Red Wings (1953–54)	5–3–0

November

Game	Result	Date	Score	Opponent	Record
9	T	November 1, 1953	0–0	@ Chicago Black Hawks (1953–54)	5–3–1
10	W	November 5, 1953	4–2	Chicago Black Hawks (1953–54)	6–3–1
11	L	November 7, 1953	2–5	@ Montreal Canadiens (1953–54)	6–4–1
12	W	November 8, 1953	2–0	Montreal Canadiens (1953–54)	7–4–1
13	T	November 11, 1953	2–2	Detroit Red Wings (1953–54)	7–4–2
14	L	November 14, 1953	0–2	@ Toronto Maple Leafs (1953–54)	7–5–2
15	T	November 15, 1953	1–1	Toronto Maple Leafs (1953–54)	7–5–3
16	L	November 19, 1953	2–3	@ Detroit Red Wings (1953–54)	7–6–3
17	W	November 20, 1953	2–0	@ Chicago Black Hawks (1953–54)	8–6–3
18	T	November 22, 1953	2–2	Montreal Canadiens (1953–54)	8–6–4
19	L	November 25, 1953	3–5	@ New York Rangers (1953–54)	8–7–4
20	W	November 26, 1953	5–2	New York Rangers (1953–54)	9–7–4
21	W	November 29, 1953	2–1	Toronto Maple Leafs (1953–54)	10–7–4

December

Game	Result	Date	Score	Opponent	Record
22	W	December 3, 1953	3–1	Chicago Black Hawks (1953–54)	11–7–4
23	L	December 5, 1953	2–4	@ Montreal Canadiens (1953–54)	11–8–4
24	L	December 6, 1953	2–7	Montreal Canadiens (1953–54)	11–9–4
25	W	December 10, 1953	6–3	Detroit Red Wings (1953–54)	12–9–4
26	L	December 12, 1953	1–7	@ Detroit Red Wings (1953–54)	12–10–4
27	T	December 13, 1953	2–2	@ Chicago Black Hawks (1953–54)	12–10–5
28	L	December 16, 1953	3–4	@ New York Rangers (1953–54)	12–11–5
29	W	December 17, 1953	3–2	Toronto Maple Leafs (1953–54)	13–11–5
30	L	December 19, 1953	3–7	@ Montreal Canadiens (1953–54)	13–12–5
31	L	December 20, 1953	2–4	Detroit Red Wings (1953–54)	13–13–5
32	W	December 25, 1953	4–1	Chicago Black Hawks (1953–54)	14–13–5
33	L	December 27, 1953	1–2	@ Detroit Red Wings (1953–54)	14–14–5
34	W	December 29, 1953	6–2	@ New York Rangers (1953–54)	15–14–5

January

Game	Result	Date	Score	Opponent	Record
35	L	January 1, 1954	1–2	New York Rangers (1953–54)	15–15–5
36	T	January 2, 1954	1–1	@ Montreal Canadiens (1953–54)	15–15–6
37	L	January 7, 1954	1–3	@ Detroit Red Wings (1953–54)	15–16–6
38	L	January 9, 1954	2–3	@ Toronto Maple Leafs (1953–54)	15–17–6
39	W	January 10, 1954	5–3	Chicago Black Hawks (1953–54)	16–17–6
40	L	January 14, 1954	1–2	Detroit Red Wings (1953–54)	16–18–6
41	L	January 16, 1954	1–2	@ Montreal Canadiens (1953–54)	16–19–6
42	W	January 17, 1954	3–2	Montreal Canadiens (1953–54)	17–19–6
43	L	January 20, 1954	3–8	@ New York Rangers (1953–54)	17–20–6
44	W	January 21, 1954	3–2	@ Chicago Black Hawks (1953–54)	18–20–6
45	L	January 23, 1954	3–4	New York Rangers (1953–54)	18–21–6
46	W	January 24, 1954	2–1	New York Rangers (1953–54)	19–21–6
47	W	January 28, 1954	3–2	Chicago Black Hawks (1953–54)	20–21–6
48	L	January 30, 1954	2–4	@ Toronto Maple Leafs (1953–54)	20–22–6
49	W	January 31, 1954	2–0	Toronto Maple Leafs (1953–54)	21–22–6

February

Game	Result	Date	Score	Opponent	Record
50	L	February 4, 1954	0–5	@ Detroit Red Wings (1953–54)	21–23–6
51	L	February 6, 1954	2–4	Detroit Red Wings (1953–54)	21–24–6
52	T	February 7, 1954	1–1	Detroit Red Wings (1953–54)	21–24–7
53	W	February 10, 1954	3–2	@ Toronto Maple Leafs (1953–54)	22–24–7
54	L	February 11, 1954	1–3	Toronto Maple Leafs (1953–54)	22–25–7
55	W	February 13, 1954	1–0	New York Rangers (1953–54)	23–25–7
56	W	February 14, 1954	4–1	Montreal Canadiens (1953–54)	24–25–7
57	L	February 17, 1954	1–2	@ New York Rangers (1953–54)	24–26–7
58	L	February 20, 1954	2–3	@ Toronto Maple Leafs (1953–54)	24–27–7
59	W	February 21, 1954	4–3	@ Chicago Black Hawks (1953–54)	25–27–7
60	W	February 24, 1954	5–3	@ New York Rangers (1953–54)	26–27–7

March

Game	Result	Date	Score	Opponent	Record
61	T	March 4, 1954	1–1	Montreal Canadiens (1953–54)	26–27–8
62	T	March 6, 1954	3–3	@ Montreal Canadiens (1953–54)	26–27–9
63	W	March 7, 1954	6–0	Chicago Black Hawks (1953–54)	27–27–9
64	W	March 11, 1954	1–0	New York Rangers (1953–54)	28–27–9
65	W	March 13, 1954	2–1	@ Toronto Maple Leafs (1953–54)	29–27–9
66	W	March 14, 1954	3–0	Toronto Maple Leafs (1953–54)	30–27–9
67	W	March 16, 1954	4–2	Detroit Red Wings (1953–54)	31–27–9
68	T	March 18, 1954	3–3	@ Detroit Red Wings (1953–54)	31–27–10
69	L	March 19, 1954	0–7	@ Chicago Black Hawks (1953–54)	31–28–10
70	W	March 21, 1954	9–5	Chicago Black Hawks (1953–54)	32–28–10

Legend: Win (2 points) Loss (0 points) Tie (1 point)

== Player statistics ==
=== Regular season ===
Scoring

Player	Pos	GP	G	A	Pts	PIM
Ed Sandford	LW	70	16	31	47	42
Fleming MacKell	C	67	15	32	47	60
Johnny Peirson	RW	68	21	19	40	55
Dave Creighton	C	69	20	20	40	27
Joe Klukay	LW	70	20	17	37	27
Leo Labine	RW	68	16	19	35	57
Cal Gardner	C	70	14	20	34	62
Milt Schmidt	C/D	62	14	18	32	28
Doug Mohns	LW/D	70	13	14	27	27
Frank Martin	D	68	3	17	20	38
Hal Laycoe	D	58	3	16	19	29
Bill Quackenbush	D	45	0	17	17	6
Warren Godfrey	D	70	5	9	14	71
Bob Armstrong	D	64	2	10	12	81
Woody Dumart	LW	69	4	3	7	6
Ray Gariepy	D	35	1	6	7	39
Gus Bodnar	C	14	3	3	6	10
Real Chevrefils	LW	14	4	1	5	2
Jerry Toppazzini	RW	37	0	5	5	24
Jim Henry	G	70	0	0	0	0

Goaltending

Player	MIN	GP	W	L	T	GA	GAA	SO
Jim Henry	4200	70	32	28	10	181	2.59	8
Team:	4200	70	32	28	10	181	2.59	8

=== Playoffs ===
Scoring

Player	Pos	GP	G	A	Pts	PIM
Cal Gardner	C	4	1	1	2	0
Fleming MacKell	C	4	1	1	2	8
Doug Mohns	LW/D	4	1	0	1	4
Milt Schmidt	C/D	4	1	0	1	20
Bob Armstrong	D	4	0	1	1	0
Leo Labine	RW	4	0	1	1	8
Frank Martin	D	4	0	1	1	0
Ed Sandford	LW	3	0	1	1	4
Gus Bodnar	C	1	0	0	0	0
Wayne Brown	RW	4	0	0	0	2
Dave Creighton	C	4	0	0	0	0
Woody Dumart	LW	4	0	0	0	0
Guyle Fielder	C	2	0	0	0	2
Warren Godfrey	D	4	0	0	0	4
Jim Henry	G	4	0	0	0	0
Joe Klukay	LW	4	0	0	0	0
Hal Laycoe	D	2	0	0	0	0
Johnny Peirson	RW	4	0	0	0	2
Bill Quackenbush	D	4	0	0	0	0

Goaltending

Player	MIN	GP	W	L	GA	GAA	SO
Jim Henry	240	4	0	4	16	4.00	0
Team:	240	4	0	4	16	4.00	0

Note:

Pos = Position;GP = Games played; G = Goals; A = Assists; Pts = Points; PIM = Penalty minutes; +/- = Plus/minus; PPG = Power-play goals; SHG = Short-handed goals; GWG = Game-winning goals
Pos = Position;GP = Games played; Min, TOI = Minutes played; W = Wins; L = Losses; T,T/OT = Ties; OTL = Overtime losses; GA = Goals-against; GAA = Goals-against average; SO = Shutouts; SA = Shots against; SV = Shots saved;SV% = Save percentage;

== See also ==
- 1953–54 NHL season
