= 1953–54 Montreal Canadiens season =

NHL hockey team season

1953–54 Montreal Canadiens
- League: 2nd NHL
- 1953–54 record: 35–24–11
- Home record: 27–5–3
- Road record: 8–19–8
- Goals for: 195
- Goals against: 141

Team information
- General manager: Frank J. Selke
- Coach: Dick Irvin
- Captain: Emile Bouchard
- Arena: Montreal Forum

Team leaders
- Goals: Maurice Richard (37)
- Assists: Maurice Richard (30)
- Points: Maurice Richard (67)
- Penalty minutes: Maurice Richard (112)
- Wins: Gerry McNeil (28)
- Goals against average: Jacques Plante (1.59)

The 1953–54 Montreal Canadiens season was the 45th season in franchise history. The team placed second in the regular season to qualify for the playoffs. The Canadiens lost in Stanley Cup Finals against Detroit Red Wings 4 games to 3.

== Pre-season ==
"Punch Line" center Elmer Lach retired.

== Regular season ==
=== Final standings ===
National Hockey League
		GP	W	L	T	GF	GA	DIFF	Pts
1	Detroit Red Wings	70	37	19	14	191	132	+59	88
2	Montreal Canadiens	70	35	24	11	195	141	+54	81
3	Toronto Maple Leafs	70	32	24	14	152	131	+21	78
4	Boston Bruins	70	32	28	10	177	181	−4	74
5	New York Rangers	70	29	31	10	161	182	−21	68
6	Chicago Black Hawks	70	12	51	7	133	242	−109	31

=== Record vs. opponents ===
1953–54 NHL Records
Team	BOS	CHI	DET	MTL	NYR	TOR
Boston	—	11–1–2	3–8–3	4–6–4	7–7	7–6–1
Chicago	1–11–2	—	2–11–1	3–9–2	3–9–2	3–11
Detroit	8–3–3	11–2–1	—	6–6–2	6–5–3	6–3–5
Montreal	6–4–4	9–3–2	6–6–2	—	9–5	5–6–3
New York	7–7	9–3–2	5–6–3	5–9	—	3–6–5
Toronto	6–7–1	11–3	3–6–5	6–5–3	6–3–5	—

== Schedule and results ==
1953–54 regular season
October

Game	Result	Date	Score	Opponent	Record
1	W	October 8, 1953	3–0	Chicago Black Hawks (1953–54)	1–0–0
2	W	October 10, 1953	4–1	Detroit Red Wings (1953–54)	2–0–0
3	L	October 11, 1953	1–4	@ Boston Bruins (1953–54)	2–1–0
4	W	October 15, 1953	6–1	New York Rangers (1953–54)	3–1–0
5	W	October 17, 1953	5–2	Boston Bruins (1953–54)	4–1–0
6	L	October 18, 1953	0–4	@ Detroit Red Wings (1953–54)	4–2–0
7	W	October 22, 1953	3–2	@ Chicago Black Hawks (1953–54)	5–2–0
8	W	October 24, 1953	1–0	Detroit Red Wings (1953–54)	6–2–0
9	W	October 25, 1953	2–1	@ New York Rangers (1953–54)	7–2–0
10	W	October 29, 1953	3–1	Toronto Maple Leafs (1953–54)	8–2–0
11	L	October 31, 1953	0–1	@ Chicago Black Hawks (1953–54)	8–3–0

November

Game	Result	Date	Score	Opponent	Record
12	L	November 1, 1953	1–5	@ Detroit Red Wings (1953–54)	8–4–0
13	W	November 5, 1953	4–3	New York Rangers (1953–54)	9–4–0
14	W	November 7, 1953	5–2	Boston Bruins (1953–54)	10–4–0
15	L	November 8, 1953	0–2	@ Boston Bruins (1953–54)	10–5–0
16	L	November 11, 1953	1–4	@ Toronto Maple Leafs (1953–54)	10–6–0
17	W	November 12, 1953	4–2	Chicago Black Hawks (1953–54)	11–6–0
18	L	November 14, 1953	2–3	Chicago Black Hawks (1953–54)	11–7–0
19	T	November 15, 1953	2–2	@ Chicago Black Hawks (1953–54)	11–7–1
20	W	November 19, 1953	1–0	Toronto Maple Leafs (1953–54)	12–7–1
21	W	November 21, 1953	1–0	Detroit Red Wings (1953–54)	13–7–1
22	T	November 22, 1953	2–2	@ Boston Bruins (1953–54)	13–7–2
23	W	November 26, 1953	6–3	@ Chicago Black Hawks (1953–54)	14–7–2
24	L	November 28, 1953	1–3	@ Toronto Maple Leafs (1953–54)	14–8–2
25	L	November 29, 1953	1–2	@ New York Rangers (1953–54)	14–9–2

December

Game	Result	Date	Score	Opponent	Record
26	W	December 3, 1953	5–1	Toronto Maple Leafs (1953–54)	15–9–2
27	W	December 5, 1953	4–2	Boston Bruins (1953–54)	16–9–2
28	W	December 6, 1953	7–2	@ Boston Bruins (1953–54)	17–9–2
29	L	December 9, 1953	0–3	@ Toronto Maple Leafs (1953–54)	17–10–2
30	W	December 10, 1953	5–3	Chicago Black Hawks (1953–54)	18–10–2
31	W	December 12, 1953	7–2	New York Rangers (1953–54)	19–10–2
32	L	December 13, 1953	3–4	@ Detroit Red Wings (1953–54)	19–11–2
33	W	December 19, 1953	7–3	Boston Bruins (1953–54)	20–11–2
34	L	December 20, 1953	1–3	@ New York Rangers (1953–54)	20–12–2
35	W	December 26, 1953	2–0	New York Rangers (1953–54)	21–12–2
36	T	December 30, 1953	2–2	@ Toronto Maple Leafs (1953–54)	21–12–3
37	T	December 31, 1953	2–2	@ Detroit Red Wings (1953–54)	21–12–4

January

Game	Result	Date	Score	Opponent	Record
38	T	January 2, 1954	1–1	Boston Bruins (1953–54)	21–12–5
39	L	January 3, 1954	3–4	@ New York Rangers (1953–54)	21–13–5
40	W	January 7, 1954	7–3	Toronto Maple Leafs (1953–54)	22–13–5
41	W	January 9, 1954	12–1	Chicago Black Hawks (1953–54)	23–13–5
42	L	January 10, 1954	1–2	@ Detroit Red Wings (1953–54)	23–14–5
43	W	January 16, 1954	2–1	Boston Bruins (1953–54)	24–14–5
44	L	January 17, 1954	2–3	@ Boston Bruins (1953–54)	24–15–5
45	L	January 21, 1954	0–1	Detroit Red Wings (1953–54)	24–16–5
46	W	January 23, 1954	5–1	Chicago Black Hawks (1953–54)	25–16–5
47	L	January 24, 1954	3–8	@ Chicago Black Hawks (1953–54)	25–17–5
48	W	January 27, 1954	2–0	@ Toronto Maple Leafs (1953–54)	26–17–5
49	L	January 30, 1954	1–2	New York Rangers (1953–54)	26–18–5

February

Game	Result	Date	Score	Opponent	Record
50	L	February 4, 1954	2–4	Toronto Maple Leafs (1953–54)	26–19–5
51	W	February 6, 1954	4–3	New York Rangers (1953–54)	27–19–5
52	W	February 7, 1954	4–1	@ New York Rangers (1953–54)	28–19–5
53	T	February 11, 1954	2–2	@ Chicago Black Hawks (1953–54)	28–19–6
54	T	February 13, 1954	2–2	@ Toronto Maple Leafs (1953–54)	28–19–7
55	L	February 14, 1954	1–4	@ Boston Bruins (1953–54)	28–20–7
56	W	February 18, 1954	4–2	Detroit Red Wings (1953–54)	29–20–7
57	W	February 20, 1954	2–0	Detroit Red Wings (1953–54)	30–20–7
58	L	February 22, 1954	0–3	@ Detroit Red Wings (1953–54)	30–21–7
59	T	February 25, 1954	0–0	Toronto Maple Leafs (1953–54)	30–21–8
60	W	February 27, 1954	5–0	New York Rangers (1953–54)	31–21–8
61	L	February 28, 1954	0–2	@ New York Rangers (1953–54)	31–22–8

March

Game	Result	Date	Score	Opponent	Record
62	T	March 4, 1954	1–1	@ Boston Bruins (1953–54)	31–22–9
63	T	March 6, 1954	3–3	Boston Bruins (1953–54)	31–22–10
64	T	March 7, 1954	2–2	@ Detroit Red Wings (1953–54)	31–22–11
65	L	March 11, 1954	0–3	Toronto Maple Leafs (1953–54)	31–23–11
66	W	March 13, 1954	4–0	Chicago Black Hawks (1953–54)	32–23–11
67	W	March 14, 1954	6–0	@ Chicago Black Hawks (1953–54)	33–23–11
68	L	March 17, 1954	1–3	@ Toronto Maple Leafs (1953–54)	33–24–11
69	W	March 20, 1954	6–1	Detroit Red Wings (1953–54)	34–24–11
70	W	March 21, 1954	3–1	@ New York Rangers (1953–54)	35–24–11

Legend: Win (2 points) Loss (0 points) Tie (1 point)

== Player statistics ==
=== Regular season ===
==== Scoring ====
Player	Pos	GP	G	A	Pts	PIM
Maurice Richard	RW	70	37	30	67	112
Bernie Geoffrion	RW	54	29	25	54	87
Bert Olmstead	LW	70	15	37	52	85
Ken Mosdell	C	67	22	24	46	64
Doug Harvey	D	68	8	29	37	110
Jean Beliveau	C	44	13	21	34	22
Paul Masnick	C	50	5	21	26	57
Elmer Lach	C	48	5	20	25	28
Calum MacKay	LW	47	10	13	23	54
Floyd Curry	RW	70	13	8	21	22
Eddie Mazur	D/LW	67	7	14	21	95
Tom Johnson	D	70	7	11	18	85
John McCormack	C	51	5	10	15	12
Dollard St. Laurent	D	53	3	12	15	43
Paul Meger	LW	44	4	9	13	24
Dick Gamble	LW	32	4	8	12	18
Emile Bouchard	D	70	1	10	11	89
Lorne Davis	RW	37	6	4	10	2
Dickie Moore	LW	13	1	4	5	12
Bud MacPherson	D	41	0	5	5	41
Andre Corriveau	RW	3	0	1	1	0
Fred Burchell	C	2	0	0	0	2
Gerry Desaulniers	C	3	0	0	0	0
Ed Litzenberger	C/RW	3	0	0	0	0
Gerry McNeil	G	53	0	0	0	0
Jacques Plante	G	17	0	0	0	0

==== Goaltending ====
Player	MIN	GP	W	L	T	GA	GAA	SO
Gerry McNeil	3180	53	28	19	6	114	2.15	6
Jacques Plante	1020	17	7	5	5	27	1.59	5
Team:	4200	70	35	24	11	141	2.01	11

=== Playoffs ===
==== Scoring ====
Player	Pos	GP	G	A	Pts	PIM
Dickie Moore	LW	11	5	8	13	8
Bernie Geoffrion	RW	11	6	5	11	18
Jean Beliveau	C	10	2	8	10	4
Floyd Curry	RW	11	4	0	4	4
Paul Masnick	C	10	0	4	4	4
Maurice Richard	RW	11	3	0	3	22
Emile Bouchard	D	11	2	1	3	4
Tom Johnson	D	11	1	2	3	30
Dollard St. Laurent	D	10	1	2	3	8
Eddie Mazur	D/LW	11	0	3	3	7
Lorne Davis	RW	11	2	0	2	8
Doug Harvey	D	10	0	2	2	12
Elmer Lach	C	4	0	2	2	0
Paul Meger	LW	6	1	0	1	4
Ken Mosdell	C	11	1	0	1	4
Calum MacKay	LW	3	0	1	1	0
John McCormack	C	7	0	1	1	0
Bert Olmstead	LW	11	0	1	1	19
Bud MacPherson	D	3	0	0	0	4
Gerry McNeil	G	3	0	0	0	0
Jacques Plante	G	8	0	0	0	0
Gaye Stewart	LW	3	0	0	0	0

==== Goaltending ====
Player	MIN	GP	W	L	GA	GAA	SO
Jacques Plante	480	8	5	3	15	1.88	2
Gerry McNeil	190	3	2	1	3	0.95	1
Team:	670	11	7	4	18	1.61	3

Note:

Pos = Position;GP = Games played; G = Goals; A = Assists; Pts = Points; PIM = Penalty minutes; +/- = Plus/minus; PPG = Power-play goals; SHG = Short-handed goals; GWG = Game-winning goals
Pos = Position;GP = Games played; Min, TOI = Minutes played; W = Wins; L = Losses; T,T/OT = Ties; OTL = Overtime losses; GA = Goals-against; GAA = Goals-against average; SO = Shutouts; SA = Shots against; SV = Shots saved;SV% = Save percentage;

== See also ==
- 1953–54 NHL season
