= 1953–54 NHL transactions =

The following is a list of all team-to-team transactions that have occurred in the National Hockey League (NHL) during the 1953–54 NHL season. It lists which team each player has been traded to and for which player(s) or other consideration(s), if applicable.

== Transactions ==
June 26, 1953	To Boston Bruins Cal Gardner	To Chicago Black Hawks cash
June 30, 1953	To Chicago Black Hawks cash	To New York Rangers rights to Doug Bentley
August 4, 1953	To Detroit Red Wings Ray Hannigan	To Chicago Black Hawks Bill Brennan
August 8, 1953	To Montreal Canadiens Pete Babando; Ed Slowinski	To New York Rangers Ivan Irwin
August 11, 1953	To Toronto Maple Leafs cash	To New York Rangers rights to Max Bentley
August 12, 1953	To Detroit Red Wings cash	To Chicago Black Hawks Lou Jankowski; Larry Wilson; Larry Zeidel
November 28, 1953	To Boston Bruins cash	To Chicago Black Hawks Jack Gelineau
January 21, 1954	To Boston Bruins cash	To Chicago Black Hawks John McIntyre
January 25, 1953	To Detroit Red Wings Jimmy Peters Sr.	To Chicago Black Hawks future considerations
February 16, 1954	To Boston Bruins Gus Bodnar	To Chicago Black Hawks Jerry Toppazzini
