= 1953–54 Toronto Maple Leafs season =

NHL hockey team season

1953–54 Toronto Maple Leafs
- League: 3rd NHL
- 1953–54 record: 32–24–14
- Home record: 22–6–7
- Road record: 10–18–7
- Goals for: 152
- Goals against: 131

Team information
- General manager: Conn Smythe
- Coach: King Clancy
- Captain: Ted Kennedy
- Arena: Maple Leaf Gardens

Team leaders
- Goals: Sid Smith (22)
- Assists: Tod Sloan (32)
- Points: Tod Sloan (43)
- Penalty minutes: Tod Sloan (100)
- Wins: Harry Lumley (32)
- Goals against average: Harry Lumley (1.86)

The 1953–54 Toronto Maple Leafs season was Toronto's 37th season in the National Hockey League (NHL). The team made the playoffs after missing the prior year, before losing in the semifinals.

== Regular season ==
=== Final standings ===
National Hockey League
		GP	W	L	T	GF	GA	DIFF	Pts
1	Detroit Red Wings	70	37	19	14	191	132	+59	88
2	Montreal Canadiens	70	35	24	11	195	141	+54	81
3	Toronto Maple Leafs	70	32	24	14	152	131	+21	78
4	Boston Bruins	70	32	28	10	177	181	−4	74
5	New York Rangers	70	29	31	10	161	182	−21	68
6	Chicago Black Hawks	70	12	51	7	133	242	−109	31

=== Record vs. opponents ===
1953–54 NHL Records
Team	BOS	CHI	DET	MTL	NYR	TOR
Boston	—	11–1–2	3–8–3	4–6–4	7–7	7–6–1
Chicago	1–11–2	—	2–11–1	3–9–2	3–9–2	3–11
Detroit	8–3–3	11–2–1	—	6–6–2	6–5–3	6–3–5
Montreal	6–4–4	9–3–2	6–6–2	—	9–5	5–6–3
New York	7–7	9–3–2	5–6–3	5–9	—	3–6–5
Toronto	6–7–1	11–3	3–6–5	6–5–3	6–3–5	—

== Schedule and results ==
1953–54 regular season
October

Game	Result	Date	Score	Opponent	Record
1	W	October 10, 1953	6–2	Chicago Black Hawks (1953–54)	1–0–0
2	L	October 11, 1953	0–4	@ Detroit Red Wings (1953–54)	1–1–0
3	W	October 15, 1953	4–1	@ Boston Bruins (1953–54)	2–1–0
4	T	October 17, 1953	1–1	New York Rangers (1953–54)	2–1–1
5	W	October 18, 1953	2–1	@ Chicago Black Hawks (1953–54)	3–1–1
6	T	October 21, 1953	1–1	Detroit Red Wings (1953–54)	3–1–2
7	L	October 24, 1953	2–3	Boston Bruins (1953–54)	3–2–2
8	L	October 25, 1953	0–2	@ Detroit Red Wings (1953–54)	3–3–2
9	L	October 29, 1953	1–3	@ Montreal Canadiens (1953–54)	3–4–2
10	W	October 31, 1953	4–1	New York Rangers (1953–54)	4–4–2

November

Game	Result	Date	Score	Opponent	Record
11	T	November 1, 1953	2–2	@ New York Rangers (1953–54)	4–4–3
12	W	November 4, 1953	3–1	Chicago Black Hawks (1953–54)	5–4–3
13	T	November 7, 1953	2–2	Detroit Red Wings (1953–54)	5–4–4
14	W	November 8, 1953	2–1	@ Chicago Black Hawks (1953–54)	6–4–4
15	W	November 11, 1953	4–1	Montreal Canadiens (1953–54)	7–4–4
16	W	November 14, 1953	2–0	Boston Bruins (1953–54)	8–4–4
17	T	November 15, 1953	1–1	@ Boston Bruins (1953–54)	8–4–5
18	L	November 19, 1953	0–1	@ Montreal Canadiens (1953–54)	8–5–5
19	W	November 21, 1953	1–0	New York Rangers (1953–54)	9–5–5
20	W	November 22, 1953	5–1	@ Chicago Black Hawks (1953–54)	10–5–5
21	L	November 26, 1953	0–2	@ Detroit Red Wings (1953–54)	10–6–5
22	W	November 28, 1953	3–1	Montreal Canadiens (1953–54)	11–6–5
23	L	November 29, 1953	1–2	@ Boston Bruins (1953–54)	11–7–5

December

Game	Result	Date	Score	Opponent	Record
24	L	December 3, 1953	1–5	@ Montreal Canadiens (1953–54)	11–8–5
25	W	December 5, 1953	3–0	Detroit Red Wings (1953–54)	12–8–5
26	T	December 6, 1953	3–3	@ New York Rangers (1953–54)	12–8–6
27	W	December 9, 1953	3–0	Montreal Canadiens (1953–54)	13–8–6
28	W	December 12, 1953	2–0	Chicago Black Hawks (1953–54)	14–8–6
29	W	December 13, 1953	2–1	@ New York Rangers (1953–54)	15–8–6
30	L	December 17, 1953	2–3	@ Boston Bruins (1953–54)	15–9–6
31	W	December 19, 1953	3–2	New York Rangers (1953–54)	16–9–6
32	L	December 20, 1953	1–4	@ Chicago Black Hawks (1953–54)	16–10–6
33	W	December 26, 1953	4–2	Detroit Red Wings (1953–54)	17–10–6
34	T	December 30, 1953	2–2	Montreal Canadiens (1953–54)	17–10–7

January

Game	Result	Date	Score	Opponent	Record
35	W	January 2, 1954	4–0	Chicago Black Hawks (1953–54)	18–10–7
36	T	January 3, 1954	0–0	@ Detroit Red Wings (1953–54)	18–10–8
37	L	January 7, 1954	3–7	@ Montreal Canadiens (1953–54)	18–11–8
38	W	January 9, 1954	3–2	Boston Bruins (1953–54)	19–11–8
39	L	January 10, 1954	1–4	@ New York Rangers (1953–54)	19–12–8
40	W	January 13, 1954	2–1	Chicago Black Hawks (1953–54)	20–12–8
41	W	January 16, 1954	4–0	New York Rangers (1953–54)	21–12–8
42	W	January 17, 1954	3–1	@ Chicago Black Hawks (1953–54)	22–12–8
43	W	January 23, 1954	4–1	Detroit Red Wings (1953–54)	23–12–8
44	L	January 24, 1954	0–2	@ Detroit Red Wings (1953–54)	23–13–8
45	L	January 27, 1954	0–2	Montreal Canadiens (1953–54)	23–14–8
46	W	January 30, 1954	4–2	Boston Bruins (1953–54)	24–14–8
47	L	January 31, 1954	0–2	@ Boston Bruins (1953–54)	24–15–8

February

Game	Result	Date	Score	Opponent	Record
48	W	February 4, 1954	4–2	@ Montreal Canadiens (1953–54)	25–15–8
49	W	February 6, 1954	6–0	Chicago Black Hawks (1953–54)	26–15–8
50	L	February 7, 1954	1–2	@ Chicago Black Hawks (1953–54)	26–16–8
51	L	February 10, 1954	2–3	Boston Bruins (1953–54)	26–17–8
52	W	February 11, 1954	3–1	@ Boston Bruins (1953–54)	27–17–8
53	T	February 13, 1954	2–2	Montreal Canadiens (1953–54)	27–17–9
54	T	February 14, 1954	3–3	@ New York Rangers (1953–54)	27–17–10
55	T	February 17, 1954	0–0	Detroit Red Wings (1953–54)	27–17–11
56	W	February 20, 1954	3–2	Boston Bruins (1953–54)	28–17–11
57	L	February 21, 1954	1–6	@ New York Rangers (1953–54)	28–18–11
58	T	February 25, 1954	0–0	@ Montreal Canadiens (1953–54)	28–18–12
59	W	February 27, 1954	4–2	Chicago Black Hawks (1953–54)	29–18–12
60	L	February 28, 1954	1–2	@ Chicago Black Hawks (1953–54)	29–19–12

March

Game	Result	Date	Score	Opponent	Record
61	T	March 3, 1954	3–3	New York Rangers (1953–54)	29–19–13
62	T	March 4, 1954	3–3	@ Detroit Red Wings (1953–54)	29–19–14
63	L	March 6, 1954	1–3	Detroit Red Wings (1953–54)	29–20–14
64	W	March 7, 1954	4–0	@ New York Rangers (1953–54)	30–20–14
65	W	March 11, 1954	3–0	@ Montreal Canadiens (1953–54)	31–20–14
66	L	March 13, 1954	1–2	Boston Bruins (1953–54)	31–21–14
67	L	March 14, 1954	0–3	@ Boston Bruins (1953–54)	31–22–14
68	W	March 17, 1954	3–1	Montreal Canadiens (1953–54)	32–22–14
69	L	March 20, 1954	2–5	New York Rangers (1953–54)	32–23–14
70	L	March 21, 1954	1–6	@ Detroit Red Wings (1953–54)	32–24–14

Legend: Win (2 points) Loss (0 points) Tie (1 point)

== Player statistics ==
=== Regular season ===
Scoring

Player	GP	G	A	Pts	PIM
Tod Sloan	67	11	32	43	100
Sid Smith	70	22	16	38	28
Ted Kennedy	67	15	23	38	78
George Armstrong	63	17	15	32	60
Tim Horton	70	7	24	31	94
Harry Watson	70	21	7	28	30
Jimmy Thomson	61	2	24	26	86
Ron Stewart	70	14	11	25	72
Eric Nesterenko	68	14	9	23	70
Rudy Migay	70	8	15	23	60
Jim Morrison	60	9	11	20	51
Bob Bailey	48	2	7	9	70
Gord Hannigan	35	4	4	8	18
Fern Flaman	62	0	8	8	84
Leo Boivin	58	1	6	7	81
Bob Solinger	39	3	2	5	2
Bob Hassard	26	1	4	5	4
Howie Meeker	5	1	0	1	0
Earl Balfour	17	0	1	1	6
Danny Lewicki	7	0	1	1	12
Hugh Bolton	9	0	0	0	10
Harry Lumley	69	0	0	0	6
Gilles Mayer	1	0	0	0	0

Goaltending

Player	MIN	GP	W	L	T	GA	GAA	SA	SV	SV%	SO
Harry Lumley	4140	69	32	24	13	128	1.86				13
Gilles Mayer	60	1	0	0	1	3	3.00				0
Team:	4200	70	32	24	14	131	1.87				13

=== Playoffs ===
Scoring

Player	GP	G	A	Pts	PIM
Gord Hannigan	5	2	0	2	4
Tim Horton	5	1	1	2	4
Ted Kennedy	5	1	1	2	2
Tod Sloan	5	1	1	2	4
Sid Smith	5	1	1	2	0
Bob Bailey	5	0	2	2	4
George Armstrong	5	1	0	1	2
Rudy Migay	5	1	0	1	4
Hugh Bolton	5	0	1	1	4
Eric Nesterenko	5	0	1	1	9
Ron Stewart	5	0	1	1	10
Harry Watson	5	0	1	1	2
Leo Boivin	5	0	0	0	2
Fern Flaman	2	0	0	0	0
Harry Lumley	5	0	0	0	0
Jim Morrison	5	0	0	0	4
Jimmy Thomson	3	0	0	0	2

Goaltending

Player	MIN	GP	W	L	T	GA	GAA	SA	SV	SV%	SO
Harry Lumley	321	5	1	4		15	2.80				0
Team:	321	5	1	4		15	2.80				0

== See also ==
- 1953–54 NHL season
