= List of Boston Bruins seasons =

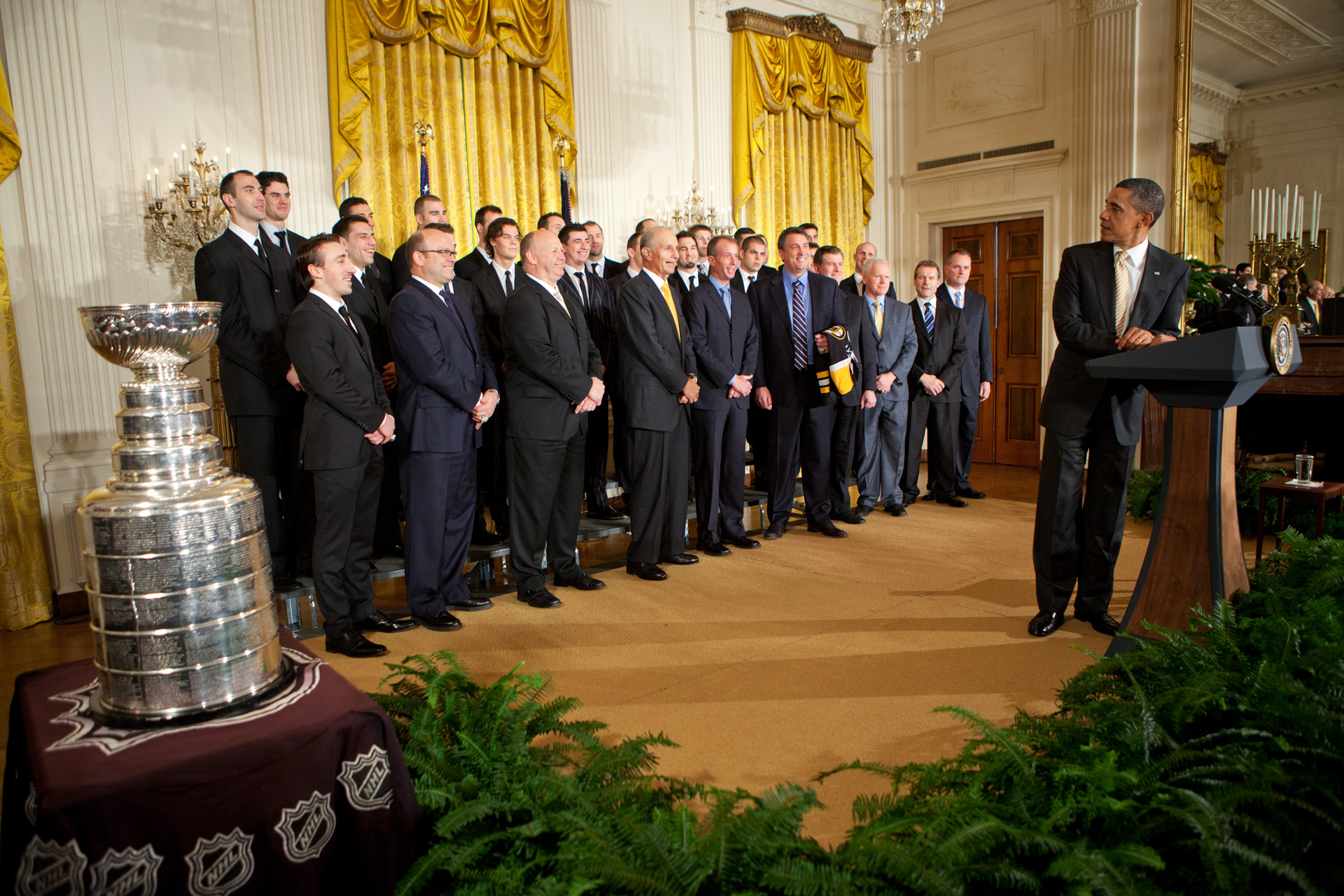
The 2011 Stanley Cup champion Bruins meet then-U.S. President Barack Obama.

The Boston Bruins are a professional ice hockey team based in Boston. They are members of the Atlantic Division in the Eastern Conference of the National Hockey League (NHL) and are one of the "Original Six" teams of the league. Founded in 1924, they are the league's third-oldest team and the oldest team based in the United States, with the 2023–24 season marking the 100th year of operation for the franchise. As of the end of the 2023–24 season, the Bruins have won 3,404 regular season games, accumulated 30 division championships and five conference championships, led the league in points fifteen times, appeared in the playoffs 77 times, appeared in Stanley Cup Finals 20 times, and won six Stanley Cup titles.

The Bruins started play in 1924, and won their first Stanley Cup championship in 1929, winning two games against the New York Rangers in the Finals. Over the next 12 seasons, the Bruins reached the Stanley Cup Final three times, losing to the Montreal Canadiens in 1930 and winning their second and third championship titles in 1939 and 1941. The Bruins fared decently in terms of playoff appearance until they reached an eight-year playoff drought from 1960 to 1967. They made up for the drought by winning the Stanley Cup in 1970 and 1972. The Bruins missed the playoffs in 1997, finishing with the worst record of the season with 61 points, ending a 29-year playoff appearance streak, the longest in NHL history. Throughout the streak, the Bruins qualified for the Stanley Cup Final five times apart from their 1970 and 1972 wins—1974, 1977, 1978, 1988, and 1990. The 1989–90 season was also the season they won their first Presidents' Trophy title, accumulating 101 points. Throughout the next nine seasons, the Bruins faced a rough patch, qualifying for the playoffs five times and missing the playoffs four times.

The Bruins started another playoff streak in 2008. In 2011, the Bruins defeated the Vancouver Canucks in seven games to win their sixth Stanley Cup. The Bruins then reached the Finals in 2013, but fell to the Chicago Blackhawks. The Bruins won their second Presidents' Trophy the next season, achieving 117 points, but they lost in the second round of the playoffs to the Canadiens. The next season, the Bruins' playoff streak ended at seven seasons after they failed to qualify due to many reasons, including injuries and a lack of scoring depth. They missed the playoffs for a second season in 2016, but qualified in 2017. In 2019, the Bruins made it to the Finals, but came short, losing to the St. Louis Blues in seven games. The next season, 2019–20, was shortened due to the COVID-19 pandemic. However, the Bruins came out on top and won their third Presidents' Trophy, managing 100 points through only 70 games. They lost in the second round of the playoffs to the Tampa Bay Lightning. The 2022–23 season saw the Bruins make history, achieving 65 wins and 135 points, the most wins and points by a team ever, for a fourth Presidents' Trophy title. However, they got upset in the first round of the playoffs by the Florida Panthers after blowing a 3–1 series lead. In the 2024 playoffs, they lost to the Panthers again, this time in the second round. As of the culmination of the 2023–24 season, the Bruins are maintaining an eight-year playoff qualification streak.

== Table keys ==
Key of colors and symbols
Color/symbol	Explanation
†	Stanley Cup champions
‡	Conference champions
↑	Division champions
#	Led league in points

Key of terms and abbreviations
Term or abbreviation	Definition
Finish	Final position in division or league standings
GP	Number of games played
W	Number of wins
L	Number of losses
T	Number of ties
OT	Number of losses in overtime (since the 1999–2000 season)
Pts	Number of points
GF	Goals for (goals scored by the Bruins)
GA	Goals against (goals scored by the Bruins' opponents)
—	Does not apply
TG	Two-game total goals series

== Year by year ==
Full list of Boston Bruins seasons
NHL season	Bruins season	Conference	Division	Regular season									Postseason						
NHL season	Bruins season	Conference	Division	Finish	GP	W	L	T	OT	Pts	GF	GA	GP	W	L	T	GF	GA	Playoffs Result
1924–25	1924–25	—	—^{[a]}	6th	30	6	24	0	—	12	49	119	—	—	—	—	—	—	Did not qualify
1925–26	1925–26	—	—	4th	36	17	15	4	—	38	92	85	—	—	—	—	—	—	Did not qualify
1926–27	1926–27	—	American^{[b]}	2nd	44	21	20	3	—	45	97	89	8	2	2	4	16	13	Won quarterfinals vs. Chicago Black Hawks, 10–5 (TG); Won semifinals vs. New York Rangers, 3–1 (TG); Lost Stanley Cup Final to Ottawa Senators, 0–2–2
1927–28	1927–28	—	American↑	1st	44	20	13	11	—	51	77	70	2	0	1	1	2	5	Lost semifinals to New York Rangers, 2–5 (TG)
1928–29	1928–29	—	American↑	1st	44	26	13	5	—	57	89	52	5	5	0	0	9	3	Won semifinals vs. Montreal Canadiens, 3–0; Won Stanley Cup Final vs. New York Rangers, 2–0†
1929–30	1929–30	—	American↑	1st	44	38	5	1	—	77#	179	98	6	3	3	0	14	12	Won semifinals vs. Montreal Maroons, 3–1; Lost Stanley Cup Final to Montreal Canadiens, 0–2
1930–31	1930–31	—	American↑	1st	44	28	10	6	—	62#	143	90	5	2	3	0	13	13	Lost semifinals to Montreal Canadiens, 2–3
1931–32	1931–32	—	American	4th	48	15	21	12	—	42	122	117	—	—	—	—	—	—	Did not qualify
1932–33	1932–33	—	American↑	1st	48	25	15	8	—	58#	124	88	5	2	3	0	7	9	Lost semifinals to Toronto Maple Leafs, 2–3
1933–34	1933–34	—	American	4th	48	18	25	5	—	41	111	130	—	—	—	—	—	—	Did not qualify
1934–35	1934–35	—	American↑	1st	48	26	16	6	—	58	129	112	4	1	3	0	2	7	Lost semifinals to Toronto Maple Leafs, 1–3
1935–36	1935–36	—	American	2nd	48	22	20	6	—	50	92	83	2	1	1	0	6	8	Lost quarterfinals to Toronto Maple Leafs, 6–8 (TG)
1936–37	1936–37	—	American	2nd	48	23	18	7	—	53	120	110	3	1	2	0	6	8	Lost quarterfinals to Montreal Maroons, 1–2
1937–38	1937–38	—	American↑	1st	48	30	11	7	—	67#	142	89	3	0	3	0	3	6	Lost semifinals to Toronto Maple Leafs, 0–3
1938–39	1938–39	—	—^{[c]}	1st	48	36	10	2	—	74#	156	76	12	8	4	0	26	18	Won semifinals vs. New York Rangers, 4–3; Won Stanley Cup Final vs. Toronto Maple Leafs, 4–1†
1939–40	1939–40	—	—	1st	48	31	12	5	—	67#	170	98	6	2	4	0	9	15	Lost semifinals to New York Rangers, 2–4
1940–41	1940–41	—	—	1st	48	27	8	13	—	67#	168	102	11	8	3	0	27	23	Won semifinals vs. Toronto Maple Leafs, 4–3; Won Stanley Cup Final vs. Detroit Red Wings, 4–0†
1941–42	1941–42	—	—	3rd	48	25	17	6	—	56	160	118	5	2	3	0	10	16	Won quarterfinals vs. Chicago Black Hawks, 2–1; Lost semifinals to Detroit Red Wings, 0–2
1942–43	1942–43	—	—	2nd	50	24	17	9	—	57	195	176	9	4	5	0	23	33	Won semifinals vs. Montreal Canadiens, 4–1; Lost Stanley Cup Final to Detroit Red Wings, 0–4
1943–44	1943–44	—	—	5th	50	19	26	5	—	43	223	268	—	—	—	—	—	—	Did not qualify
1944–45	1944–45	—	—	4th	50	16	30	4	—	36	179	219	7	3	4	0	22	22	Lost semifinals to Detroit Red Wings, 3–4
1945–46	1945–46	—	—	2nd	50	24	18	8	—	56	167	156	10	5	5	0	29	29	Won semifinals vs. Detroit Red Wings, 4–1; Lost Stanley Cup Final to Montreal Canadiens, 1–4
1946–47	1946–47	—	—	3rd	60	26	23	11	—	63	190	175	5	1	4	0	10	16	Lost semifinals to Montreal Canadiens, 1–4
1947–48	1947–48	—	—	3rd	60	23	24	13	—	59	167	168	5	1	4	0	13	20	Lost semifinals to Toronto Maple Leafs, 1–4
1948–49	1948–49	—	—	2nd	60	29	23	8	—	66	178	163	5	1	4	0	10	16	Lost semifinals to Toronto Maple Leafs, 1–4
1949–50	1949–50	—	—	5th	70	22	32	16	—	60	198	228	—	—	—	—	—	—	Did not qualify
1950–51	1950–51	—	—	4th	70	22	30	18	—	62	178	197	6	1	4	1	5	17	Lost semifinals to Toronto Maple Leafs, 1–4–1
1951–52	1951–52	—	—	4th	70	25	29	16	—	66	162	176	7	3	4	—	12	18	Lost semifinals to Montreal Canadiens, 3–4
1952–53	1952–53	—	—	3rd	70	28	29	13	—	69	152	172	11	5	6	—	30	37	Won semifinals vs. Detroit Red Wings, 4–2; Lost Stanley Cup Final to Montreal Canadiens, 1–4
1953–54	1953–54	—	—	4th	70	32	28	10	—	74	177	181	4	0	4	—	4	16	Lost semifinals to Montreal Canadiens, 0–4
1954–55	1954–55	—	—	4th	70	23	26	21	—	67	169	188	5	1	4	—	9	16	Lost semifinals to Montreal Canadiens, 1–4
1955–56	1955–56	—	—	5th	70	23	34	13	—	59	147	185	—	—	—	—	—	—	Did not qualify
1956–57	1956–57	—	—	3rd	70	34	24	12	—	80	195	174	10	5	5	—	21	29	Won semifinals vs. Detroit Red Wings, 4–1; Lost Stanley Cup Final to Montreal Canadiens, 1–4
1957–58	1957–58	—	—	4th	70	27	28	15	—	69	199	194	12	6	6	—	42	32	Won semifinals vs. New York Rangers, 4–2; Lost Stanley Cup Final to Montreal Canadiens, 2–4
1958–59	1958–59	—	—	2nd	70	32	29	9	—	73	205	215	7	3	4	—	21	20	Lost semifinals to Toronto Maple Leafs, 3–4
1959–60	1959–60	—	—	5th	70	28	34	8	—	64	220	241	—	—	—	—	—	—	Did not qualify
1960–61	1960–61	—	—	6th	70	15	42	13	—	43	176	254	—	—	—	—	—	—	Did not qualify
1961–62	1961–62	—	—	6th	70	15	47	8	—	38	177	306	—	—	—	—	—	—	Did not qualify
1962–63	1962–63	—	—	6th	70	14	39	17	—	45	198	281	—	—	—	—	—	—	Did not qualify
1963–64	1963–64	—	—	6th	70	18	40	12	—	48	170	212	—	—	—	—	—	—	Did not qualify
1964–65	1964–65	—	—	6th	70	21	43	6	—	48	166	253	—	—	—	—	—	—	Did not qualify
1965–66	1965–66	—	—	5th	70	21	43	6	—	48	174	275	—	—	—	—	—	—	Did not qualify
1966–67	1966–67	—	—	6th	70	17	43	10	—	44	182	253	—	—	—	—	—	—	Did not qualify
1967–68	1967–68	—	East^{[d]}	3rd	74	37	27	10	—	84	259	216	4	0	4	—	8	15	Lost quarterfinals to Montreal Canadiens, 0–4
1968–69	1968–69	—	East	2nd	76	42	18	16	—	100	303	221	10	6	4	—	40	20	Won quarterfinals vs. Toronto Maple Leafs, 4–0; Lost semifinals to Montreal Canadiens, 2–4
1969–70	1969–70	—	East	2nd	76	40	17	19	—	99	277	216	14	12	2	—	65	33	Won quarterfinals vs. New York Rangers, 4–2; Won semifinals vs. Chicago Black Hawks, 4–0; Won Stanley Cup Final vs. St. Louis Blues, 4–0†
1970–71	1970–71	—	East↑	1st	78	57	14	7	—	121#	399	207	7	3	4	—	26	28	Lost quarterfinals to Montreal Canadiens, 3–4
1971–72	1971–72	—	East↑	1st	78	54	13	11	—	119#	330	204	15	12	3	—	64	34	Won quarterfinals vs. Toronto Maple Leafs, 4–1; Won semifinals vs. St. Louis Blues, 4–0; Won Stanley Cup Final vs. New York Rangers, 4–2†
1972–73	1972–73	—	East	2nd	78	51	22	5	—	107	330	235	5	1	4	—	11	22	Lost quarterfinals to New York Rangers, 1–4
1973–74	1973–74	—	East↑	1st	78	52	17	9	—	113#	349	221	16	10	6	—	58	44	Won quarterfinals vs. Toronto Maple Leafs, 4–0; Won semifinals vs. Chicago Black Hawks, 4–2; Lost Stanley Cup Final to Philadelphia Flyers, 2–4
1974–75	1974–75	Wales^{[e]}	Adams	2nd	80	40	26	14	—	94	345	245	3	1	2	—	15	12	Lost preliminary Round to Chicago Black Hawks, 1–2
1975–76	1975–76	Wales	Adams↑	1st	80	48	15	17	—	113	313	237	12	5	7	—	38	33	Won quarterfinals vs. Los Angeles Kings, 4–3; Lost semifinals to Philadelphia Flyers, 1–4
1976–77	1976–77	Wales	Adams↑	1st	80	49	23	8	—	106	312	240	14	8	6	—	50	48	Won quarterfinals vs. Los Angeles Kings, 4–2; Won semifinals vs. Philadelphia Flyers, 4–0; Lost Stanley Cup Final to Montreal Canadiens, 0–4
1977–78	1977–78	Wales	Adams↑	1st	80	51	18	11	—	113	333	218	15	10	5	—	53	42	Won quarterfinals vs. Chicago Black Hawks, 4–0; Won semifinals vs. Philadelphia Flyers, 4–1; Lost Stanley Cup Final to Montreal Canadiens, 2–4
1978–79	1978–79	Wales	Adams↑	1st	80	43	23	14	—	100	316	270	11	7	4	—	36	32	Won quarterfinals vs. Pittsburgh Penguins, 4–0; Lost semifinals to Montreal Canadiens, 3–4
1979–80	1979–80	Wales	Adams	2nd	80	46	21	13	—	105	310	234	10	4	6	—	35	33	Won preliminary round vs. Pittsburgh Penguins, 3–2; Lost quarterfinals to New York Islanders, 1–4
1980–81	1980–81	Wales	Adams	2nd	80	37	30	13	—	87	316	272	3	0	3	—	13	20	Lost preliminary Round to Minnesota North Stars, 0–3
1981–82	1981–82	Wales	Adams	2nd	80	43	27	10	—	96	323	285	11	6	5	—	43	39	Won division semifinals vs. Buffalo Sabres, 3–1; Lost division finals to Quebec Nordiques, 3–4
1982–83	1982–83	Wales	Adams↑	1st	80	50	20	10	—	110#	327	228	17	9	8	—	65	61	Won division semifinals vs. Quebec Nordiques, 3–1; Won division finals vs. Buffalo Sabres, 4–3; Lost conference finals to New York Islanders, 2–4
1983–84	1983–84	Wales	Adams↑	1st	80	49	25	6	—	104	336	261	3	0	3	—	2	10	Lost division semifinals to Montreal Canadiens, 0–3
1984–85	1984–85	Wales	Adams	4th	80	36	34	10	—	82	303	287	5	2	3	—	17	19	Lost division semifinals to Montreal Canadiens, 2–3
1985–86	1985–86	Wales	Adams	3rd	80	37	31	12	—	86	311	288	3	0	3	—	6	10	Lost division semifinals to Montreal Canadiens, 0–3
1986–87	1986–87	Wales	Adams	3rd	80	39	34	7	—	85	301	276	4	0	4	—	11	19	Lost division semifinals to Montreal Canadiens, 0–4
1987–88	1987–88	Wales‡	Adams	2nd	80	44	30	6	—	94	300	251	22	12	10	—	82	69	Won division semifinals vs. Buffalo Sabres, 4–2; Won division finals vs. Montreal Canadiens, 4–1; Won conference finals vs. New Jersey Devils, 4–3; Lost Stanley Cup Final to Edmonton Oilers, 0–4
1988–89	1988–89	Wales	Adams	2nd	80	37	29	14	—	88	289	256	10	5	5	—	29	30	Won division semifinals vs. Buffalo Sabres, 4–1; Lost division finals to Montreal Canadiens, 1–4
1989–90	1989–90	Wales‡	Adams↑	1st	80	46	25	9	—	101#	289	232	21	13	8	—	62	59	Won division semifinals vs. Hartford Whalers, 4–3; Won division finals vs. Montreal Canadiens, 4–1; Won conference finals vs. Washington Capitals, 4–0; Lost Stanley Cup Final to Edmonton Oilers, 1–4
1990–91	1990–91	Wales	Adams↑	1st	80	44	24	12	—	100	299	264	19	10	9	—	60	62	Won division semifinals vs. Hartford Whalers, 4–2; Won division finals vs. Montreal Canadiens, 4–3; Lost conference finals to Pittsburgh Penguins, 2–4
1991–92	1991–92	Wales	Adams	2nd	80	36	32	12	—	84	270	275	15	8	7	—	40	51	Won division semifinals vs. Buffalo Sabres, 4–3; Won division finals vs. Montreal Canadiens, 4–0; Lost conference finals to Pittsburgh Penguins, 0–4
1992–93	1992–93	Wales	Adams↑	1st	84	51	26	7	—	109	332	268	4	0	4	—	12	19	Lost division semifinals to Buffalo Sabres, 0–4
1993–94	1993–94	Eastern^{[f]}	Northeast	2nd	84	42	29	13	—	97	289	252	13	6	7	—	39	42	Won conference quarterfinals vs. Montreal Canadiens, 4–3; Lost conference semifinals to New Jersey Devils, 2–4
1994–95^{[g]}	1994–95	Eastern	Northeast	3rd	48	27	18	3	—	57	150	127	5	1	4	—	5	14	Lost conference quarterfinals to New Jersey Devils, 1–4
1995–96	1995–96	Eastern	Northeast	2nd	82	40	31	11	—	91	282	269	5	1	4	—	16	22	Lost conference quarterfinals to Florida Panthers, 1–4
1996–97	1996–97	Eastern	Northeast	6th	82	26	47	9	—	61	234	300	—	—	—	—	—	—	Did not qualify
1997–98	1997–98	Eastern	Northeast	2nd	82	39	30	13	—	91	221	194	6	2	4	—	13	15	Lost conference quarterfinals to Washington Capitals, 2–4
1998–99	1998–99	Eastern	Northeast	3rd	82	39	30	13	—	91	214	181	12	6	6	—	30	27	Won conference quarterfinals vs. Carolina Hurricanes, 4–2; Lost conference semifinals to Buffalo Sabres, 2–4
1999–2000	1999–2000	Eastern	Northeast	5th	82	24	33	19	6^{[h]}	73	210	248	—	—	—	—	—	—	Did not qualify
2000–01	2000–01	Eastern	Northeast	4th	82	36	30	8	8	88	227	249	—	—	—	—	—	—	Did not qualify
2001–02	2001–02	Eastern	Northeast↑	1st	82	43	24	6	9	101	236	201	6	2	4	—	18	20	Lost conference quarterfinals to Montreal Canadiens, 2–4
2002–03	2002–03	Eastern	Northeast	3rd	82	36	31	11	4	87	245	237	5	1	4	—	8	13	Lost conference quarterfinals to New Jersey Devils, 1–4
2003–04	2003–04	Eastern	Northeast↑	1st	82	41	19	15	7	104	209	188	7	3	4	—	14	19	Lost conference quarterfinals to Montreal Canadiens, 3–4
2004–05^{[i]}	2004–05	Season cancelled due to 2004–05 NHL lockout																	
2005–06	2005–06	Eastern	Northeast	5th	82	29	37	—^{[j]}	16	74	228	258	—	—	—	—	—	—	Did not qualify
2006–07	2006–07	Eastern	Northeast	5th	82	35	41	—	6	76	210	285	—	—	—	—	—	—	Did not qualify
2007–08	2007–08	Eastern	Northeast	3rd	82	41	29	—	12	94	206	215	7	3	4	—	15	19	Lost conference quarterfinals to Montreal Canadiens, 3–4
2008–09	2008–09	Eastern	Northeast↑	1st	82	53	19	—	10	116	270	190	11	7	4	—	34	22	Won conference quarterfinals vs. Montreal Canadiens, 4–0; Lost conference semifinals to Carolina Hurricanes, 3–4
2009–10	2009–10	Eastern	Northeast	3rd	82	39	30	—	13	91	196	191	13	7	6	—	36	37	Won conference quarterfinals vs. Buffalo Sabres, 4–2; Lost conference semifinals to Philadelphia Flyers, 3–4
2010–11	2010–11	Eastern‡	Northeast↑	1st	82	46	25	—	11	103	244	189	25	16	9	—	81	53	Won conference quarterfinals vs. Montreal Canadiens, 4–3; Won conference semifinals vs. Philadelphia Flyers, 4–0; Won conference finals vs. Tampa Bay Lightning, 4–3; Won Stanley Cup Final vs. Vancouver Canucks, 4–3†
2011–12	2011–12	Eastern	Northeast↑	1st	82	49	29	—	4	102	260	199	7	3	4	—	15	16	Lost conference quarterfinals to Washington Capitals, 3–4
2012–13^{[k]}	2012–13	Eastern‡	Northeast	2nd	48	28	14	—	6	62	127	106	22	14	8	—	65	47	Won conference quarterfinals vs. Toronto Maple Leafs, 4–3; Won conference semifinals vs. New York Rangers, 4–1; Won conference finals vs. Pittsburgh Penguins, 4–0; Lost Stanley Cup Final to Chicago Blackhawks, 2–4
2013–14	2013–14	Eastern	Atlantic^{[l]}↑	1st	82	54	19	—	9	117#	258	171	12	7	5	—	30	26	Won first round vs. Detroit Red Wings, 4–1; Lost second round to Montreal Canadiens, 3–4
2014–15	2014–15	Eastern	Atlantic	5th	82	41	27	—	14	96	209	201	—	—	—	—	—	—	Did not qualify
2015–16	2015–16	Eastern	Atlantic	4th	82	42	31	—	9	93	236	228	—	—	—	—	—	—	Did not qualify
2016–17	2016–17	Eastern	Atlantic	3rd	82	44	31	—	7	95	232	209	6	2	4	—	13	15	Lost first round to Ottawa Senators, 2–4
2017–18	2017–18	Eastern	Atlantic	2nd	82	50	20	—	12	112	267	211	12	5	7	—	41	37	Won first round vs. Toronto Maple Leafs, 4–3; Lost second round to Tampa Bay Lightning, 1–4
2018–19	2018–19	Eastern	Atlantic	2nd	82	49	24	—	9	107	257	212	24	15	9	—	79	51	Won first round vs. Toronto Maple Leafs, 4–3; Won second round vs. Columbus Blue Jackets, 4–2; Won conference finals vs. Carolina Hurricanes, 4–0; Lost Stanley Cup Final to St. Louis Blues, 3–4
2019–20^{[m]}	2019–20	Eastern	Atlantic↑	1st	70	44	14	—	12	100#	227	167	13	5	8	—	29	39	Finished fourth in seeding round-robin (0–3); Won first round vs. Carolina Hurricanes, 4–1; Lost second round to Tampa Bay Lightning, 1–4
2020–21^{[n]}	2020–21	—	East	3rd	56	33	16	—	7	73	164	134	11	6	5	—	33	32	Won first round vs. Washington Capitals, 4–1; Lost second round to New York Islanders, 2–4
2021–22	2021–22	Eastern	Atlantic	4th	82	51	26	—	5	107	253	218	7	3	4	—	20	24	Lost first round to Carolina Hurricanes, 3–4
2022–23	2022–23	Eastern	Atlantic↑	1st	82	65	12	—	5	135#	301	174	7	3	4	—	27	26	Lost first round to Florida Panthers, 3–4
2023–24	2023–24	Eastern	Atlantic	2nd	82	47	20	—	15	109	263	221	13	6	7	—	31	31	Won first round vs. Toronto Maple Leafs, 4–3; Lost second round to Florida Panthers, 2–4
2024–25	2024–25	Eastern	Atlantic	8th	82	33	39	—	10	76	222	271	—	—	—	—	—	—	Did not qualify
2025–26	2025–26	Eastern	Atlantic	4th	82	45	27	—	10	100	268	247	6	2	4	—	12	20	Lost first round to Buffalo Sabres, 2–4
Totals^{[o]}					7,036	3,482	2,527	791	236	7,991	22,433	20,280	708	346	356	6	2,046	2,008	78 playoff appearances

== Notes ==
- ^{a} From the 1924–25 season through the 1925–26 season, the NHL had no divisions.
- ^{b} From the 1926–27 season through the 1937–38 season, Boston played in the American Division.
- ^{c} From the 1938–39 season through the 1966–67 season, the NHL had no divisions.
- ^{d} Prior to the 1967–68 season, the NHL split into East and West Divisions because of the addition of six expansion teams.
- ^{e} The NHL realigned prior to the 1974–75 season. The Bruins were placed in the Prince of Wales Conference's Adams Division.
- ^{f} The NHL realigned into Eastern and Western conferences prior to the 1993–94 season. Boston was placed in the Northeast Division of the Eastern Conference.
- ^{g} The season was shortened to 48 games because of the 1994–95 NHL lockout.
- ^{h} Beginning with the 1999–2000 season, teams received one point for losing a regular season game in overtime.
- ^{i} The season was cancelled because of the 2004–05 NHL lockout.
- ^{j} Prior to the 2005–06 season, the NHL instituted a penalty shootout for regular season games that remained tied after a five-minute overtime period, which prevented ties.
- ^{k} The season was shortened to 48 games because of the 2012–13 NHL lockout.
- ^{l} The NHL realigned prior to the 2013–14 season. The Bruins were placed in the Atlantic Division of the Eastern Conference.
- ^{m} The regular season was suspended on March 12, 2020, due to the COVID-19 pandemic, and officially concluded on May 26, 2020, with the announcement of a 24-team expanded playoff to be held in the summer. The Bruins played 70 of their scheduled 82 games, and having secured the highest point percentage in the eastern conference, were one of the four teams to play in a three-game round-robin to determine seeding for the first round.
- ^{n} Due to the COVID-19 pandemic, the 2020–21 NHL season was shortened to 56 games.
- ^{o} Totals as of the completion of the 2025–26 season.
