= Frank Martin (ice hockey) =

Canadian ice hockey player

- Born: May 1, 1933 Cayuga, Ontario, Canada
- Died: February 18, 2007 (aged 73) St. Catharines, Ontario, Canada
- Height: 6 ft 2 in (188 cm)
- Weight: 190 lb (86 kg; 13 st 8 lb)
- Position: Defence
- Shot: Left
- Played for: Chicago Black Hawks; Boston Bruins
- Playing career: 1952–1965

Francis William Martin (May 1, 1933 — February 18, 2007) was a Canadian ice hockey player who played 282 games in the National Hockey League with the Boston Bruins and the Chicago Black Hawks between 1953 and 1957. The rest of his professional career, which lasted from 1952 to 1965, was mainly spent in the minor American Hockey League.

== Early career ==
Prior to his NHL debut, Martin played three seasons with the St. Catharines Teepees between 1949 and 1952, serving at times as both a forward and a defenceman. He was captain of the team for the 1951-52 season.

Martin was also a talented baseball pitcher, and received a contract offer from the Brooklyn Dodgers. He turned down this contract, citing greater career prospects in professional hockey.

== Professional Career ==
Martin began his professional career in the AHL with the Hershey Bears for the 1952-53 season. After defenceman Bob Armstrong was injured, Martin was called to the Boston Bruins to play 14 games with the team that season. He was then signed to the Bruins full-time for the 1953-54 season.

Martin was the first player from the St. Catharines minor hockey system to play in the NHL. At the time of joining the NHL, he was also the only ambidextrous player other than Gordie Howe.

For the 1954-55 season, Martin was traded to the Chicago Black Hawks for Murray Costello. Martin remained with the Black Hawks until the 1957-58 season, his final season in the NHL. In the following years, Martin returned to the AHL to play for the Buffalo Bisons, the Quebec Aces, and the Cleveland Barons before retiring after the 1964-65 season.

== Later Life ==
After retiring from professional hockey, Martin worked for the City of St. Catharines. He also served as head coach for the St. Catharines Falcons.

Frank Martin passed away on February 18, 2007.

== Career statistics ==
=== Regular season and playoffs ===
			Regular season					Playoffs
Season	Team	League	GP	G	A	Pts	PIM	GP	G	A	Pts	PIM
1949–50	St. Catharines Teepees	OHA	44	5	13	18	44	5	1	3	4	10
1950–51	St. Catharines Teepees	OHA	43	5	15	20	53	9	2	2	4	2
1951–52	St. Catharines Teepees	OHA	54	25	30	55	40	12	1	2	3	6
1952–53	Hershey Bears	AHL	41	5	4	9	14	3	0	1	1	0
1952–53	Boston Bruins	NHL	14	0	2	2	6	6	0	1	1	2
1953–54	Boston Bruins	NHL	68	3	17	20	38	4	0	1	1	0
1954–55	Chicago Black Hawks	NHL	66	4	8	12	35	—	—	—	—	—
1955–56	Chicago Black Hawks	NHL	61	3	11	14	21	—	—	—	—	—
1956–57	Chicago Black Hawks	NHL	70	1	8	9	12	—	—	—	—	—
1957–58	Chicago Black Hawks	NHL	3	0	0	0	10	—	—	—	—	—
1957–58	Buffalo Bisons	AHL	52	2	20	22	14	—	—	—	—	—
1958–59	Buffalo Bisons	AHL	65	4	26	30	20	8	0	6	6	5
1959–60	Buffalo Bisons	AHL	72	4	21	25	15	—	—	—	—	—
1960–61	Quebec Aces	AHL	67	3	16	19	32	—	—	—	—	—
1961–62	Quebec Aces	AHL	58	4	14	18	18	—	—	—	—	—
1962–63	Quebec Aces	AHL	67	4	30	34	34	—	—	—	—	—
1963–64	Quebec Aces	AHL	71	5	18	23	36	9	0	1	1	2
1964–65	Cleveland Barons	AHL	67	7	23	30	22	—	—	—	—	—
AHL totals			560	38	172	210	205	20	0	8	8	7
NHL totals			282	11	46	57	122	10	0	2	2	2
