= 1953–54 New York Rangers season =

NHL hockey team season

1953–54 New York Rangers
- League: 5th NHL
- 1953–54 record: 29–31–10
- Home record: 18–12–5
- Road record: 11–19–5
- Goals for: 161
- Goals against: 182

Team information
- General manager: Frank Boucher
- Coach: Frank Boucher; Muzz Patrick
- Captain: Don Raleigh
- Arena: Madison Square Garden

Team leaders
- Goals: Wally Hergesheimer (27)
- Assists: Paul Ronty (33)
- Points: Paul Ronty (46)
- Penalty minutes: Ivan Irwin (109)
- Wins: Johnny Bower (29)
- Goals against average: Johnny Bower (2.60)

The 1953–54 New York Rangers season was the franchise's 28th season. The season saw the Rangers finish in fifth place in the National Hockey League (NHL) with a record of 29 wins, 31 losses, and 10 ties for 68 points, and miss the playoffs for the fourth year in a row for the first time since the 1943–44 season and the 1946–47 season.

== Regular season ==
=== Final standings ===
National Hockey League
| | | GP | W | L | T | GF | GA | DIFF | Pts |
|---|---|---|---|---|---|---|---|---|---|
| 1 | Detroit Red Wings | 70 | 37 | 19 | 14 | 191 | 132 | +59 | 88 |
| 2 | Montreal Canadiens | 70 | 35 | 24 | 11 | 195 | 141 | +54 | 81 |
| 3 | Toronto Maple Leafs | 70 | 32 | 24 | 14 | 152 | 131 | +21 | 78 |
| 4 | Boston Bruins | 70 | 32 | 28 | 10 | 177 | 181 | −4 | 74 |
| 5 | New York Rangers | 70 | 29 | 31 | 10 | 161 | 182 | −21 | 68 |
| 6 | Chicago Black Hawks | 70 | 12 | 51 | 7 | 133 | 242 | −109 | 31 |

=== Record vs. opponents ===
1953–54 NHL Records
| Team | BOS | CHI | DET | MTL | NYR | TOR |
|---|---|---|---|---|---|---|
| Boston | — | 11–1–2 | 3–8–3 | 4–6–4 | 7–7 | 7–6–1 |
| Chicago | 1–11–2 | — | 2–11–1 | 3–9–2 | 3–9–2 | 3–11 |
| Detroit | 8–3–3 | 11–2–1 | — | 6–6–2 | 6–5–3 | 6–3–5 |
| Montreal | 6–4–4 | 9–3–2 | 6–6–2 | — | 9–5 | 5–6–3 |
| New York | 7–7 | 9–3–2 | 5–6–3 | 5–9 | — | 3–6–5 |
| Toronto | 6–7–1 | 11–3 | 3–6–5 | 6–5–3 | 6–3–5 | — |

== Schedule and results ==
1953–54 regular season
October: 2–6–1 (home: 1–2–0; road: 1–4–1)

| Game | October | Opponent | Score | Record |
|---|---|---|---|---|
| 1 | 8 | @ Detroit Red Wings | 4–1 | 0–1–0 |
| 2 | 11 | @ Chicago Black Hawks | 5–3 | 1–1–0 |
| 3 | 15 | @ Montreal Canadiens | 6–1 | 1–2–0 |
| 4 | 17 | @ Toronto Maple Leafs | 1–1 | 1–2–1 |
| 5 | 18 | @ Boston Bruins | 3–2 | 1–3–1 |
| 6 | 22 | Boston Bruins | 4–3 | 2–3–1 |
| 7 | 25 | Montreal Canadiens | 2–1 | 2–4–1 |
| 8 | 28 | Chicago Black Hawks | 6–1 | 2–5–1 |
| 9 | 31 | @ Toronto Maple Leafs | 4–1 | 2–6–1 |

November: 5–6–2 (home: 4–2–1; road: 1–4–1)

| Game | November | Opponent | Score | Record |
|---|---|---|---|---|
| 10 | 1 | Toronto Maple Leafs | 2–2 | 2–6–2 |
| 11 | 5 | @ Montreal Canadiens | 4–3 | 2–7–2 |
| 12 | 7 | @ Chicago Black Hawks | 3–1 | 3–7–2 |
| 13 | 8 | @ Detroit Red Wings | 2–2 | 3–7–3 |
| 14 | 11 | Chicago Black Hawks | 3–2 | 4–7–3 |
| 15 | 14 | Detroit Red Wings | 3–2 | 4–8–3 |
| 16 | 15 | @ Detroit Red Wings | 4–1 | 4–9–3 |
| 17 | 18 | Chicago Black Hawks | 3–1 | 5–9–3 |
| 18 | 21 | @ Toronto Maple Leafs | 1–0 | 5–10–3 |
| 19 | 22 | Detroit Red Wings | 3–2 | 5–11–3 |
| 20 | 25 | Boston Bruins | 5–3 | 6–11–3 |
| 21 | 26 | @ Boston Bruins | 5–2 | 6–12–3 |
| 22 | 29 | Montreal Canadiens | 2–1 | 7–12–3 |

December: 3–8–3 (home: 3–3–3; road: 0–5–0)

| Game | December | Opponent | Score | Record |
|---|---|---|---|---|
| 23 | 2 | Chicago Black Hawks | 3–3 | 7–12–4 |
| 24 | 3 | @ Detroit Red Wings | 4–0 | 7–13–4 |
| 25 | 5 | @ Chicago Black Hawks | 2–1 | 7–14–4 |
| 26 | 6 | Toronto Maple Leafs | 3–3 | 7–14–5 |
| 27 | 9 | Detroit Red Wings | 3–3 | 7–14–6 |
| 28 | 12 | @ Montreal Canadiens | 7–2 | 7–15–6 |
| 29 | 13 | Toronto Maple Leafs | 2–1 | 7–16–6 |
| 30 | 16 | Boston Bruins | 4–3 | 8–16–6 |
| 31 | 19 | @ Toronto Maple Leafs | 3–2 | 8–17–6 |
| 32 | 20 | Montreal Canadiens | 3–1 | 9–17–6 |
| 33 | 23 | Detroit Red Wings | 2–1 | 10–17–6 |
| 34 | 26 | @ Montreal Canadiens | 2–0 | 10–18–6 |
| 35 | 27 | Chicago Black Hawks | 4–1 | 10–19–6 |
| 36 | 29 | Boston Bruins | 6–2 | 10–20–6 |

January: 9–3–1 (home: 4–1–0; road: 5–2–1)

| Game | January | Opponent | Score | Record |
|---|---|---|---|---|
| 37 | 1 | @ Boston Bruins | 2–1 | 11–20–6 |
| 38 | 3 | Montreal Canadiens | 4–3 | 12–20–6 |
| 39 | 6 | Chicago Black Hawks | 4–3 | 13–20–6 |
| 40 | 10 | Toronto Maple Leafs | 4–1 | 14–20–6 |
| 41 | 13 | Detroit Red Wings | 3–1 | 14–21–6 |
| 42 | 14 | @ Chicago Black Hawks | 2–0 | 15–21–6 |
| 43 | 16 | @ Toronto Maple Leafs | 4–0 | 15–22–6 |
| 44 | 17 | @ Detroit Red Wings | 3–2 | 16–22–6 |
| 45 | 20 | Boston Bruins | 8–3 | 17–22–6 |
| 46 | 23 | @ Boston Bruins | 4–3 | 18–22–6 |
| 47 | 24 | @ Boston Bruins | 2–1 | 18–23–6 |
| 48 | 28 | @ Detroit Red Wings | 3–3 | 18–23–7 |
| 49 | 30 | @ Montreal Canadiens | 2–1 | 19–23–7 |

February: 6–5–1 (home: 4–2–1; road: 2–3–0)

| Game | February | Opponent | Score | Record |
|---|---|---|---|---|
| 50 | 4 | @ Chicago Black Hawks | 3–2 | 20–23–7 |
| 51 | 6 | @ Montreal Canadiens | 4–3 | 20–24–7 |
| 52 | 7 | Montreal Canadiens | 4–1 | 20–25–7 |
| 53 | 10 | Detroit Red Wings | 3–2 | 21–25–7 |
| 54 | 13 | @ Boston Bruins | 1–0 | 21–26–7 |
| 55 | 14 | Toronto Maple Leafs | 3–3 | 21–26–8 |
| 56 | 17 | Boston Bruins | 2–1 | 22–26–8 |
| 57 | 19 | @ Chicago Black Hawks | 3–0 | 23–26–8 |
| 58 | 21 | Toronto Maple Leafs | 6–1 | 24–26–8 |
| 59 | 24 | Boston Bruins | 5–3 | 24–27–8 |
| 60 | 27 | @ Montreal Canadiens | 5–0 | 24–28–8 |
| 61 | 28 | Montreal Canadiens | 2–0 | 25–28–8 |

March: 4–3–2 (home: 2–2–0; road: 2–1–2)

| Game | March | Opponent | Score | Record |
|---|---|---|---|---|
| 62 | 3 | @ Toronto Maple Leafs | 3–3 | 25–28–9 |
| 63 | 5 | @ Chicago Black Hawks | 0–0 | 25–28–10 |
| 64 | 7 | Toronto Maple Leafs | 4–0 | 25–29–10 |
| 65 | 10 | Chicago Black Hawks | 4–2 | 26–29–10 |
| 66 | 11 | @ Boston Bruins | 1–0 | 26–30–10 |
| 67 | 13 | @ Detroit Red Wings | 5–2 | 27–30–10 |
| 68 | 14 | Detroit Red Wings | 2–0 | 28–30–10 |
| 69 | 20 | @ Toronto Maple Leafs | 5–2 | 29–30–10 |
| 70 | 21 | Montreal Canadiens | 3–1 | 29–31–10 |

Legend: Win (2 points) Loss (0 points) Tie (1 point)

== Player statistics ==
Skaters

Regular season
| Player | GP | G | A | Pts | PIM |
|---|---|---|---|---|---|
| Paul Ronty | 70 | 13 | 33 | 46 | 18 |
| Don Raleigh | 70 | 15 | 30 | 45 | 16 |
| Wally Hergesheimer | 66 | 27 | 16 | 43 | 42 |
| Camille Henry | 66 | 24 | 15 | 39 | 10 |
| Nick Mickoski | 68 | 19 | 16 | 35 | 22 |
| Max Bentley | 57 | 14 | 18 | 32 | 15 |
| Dean Prentice | 52 | 4 | 13 | 17 | 18 |
| Hy Buller | 41 | 3 | 14 | 17 | 40 |
| Harry Howell | 67 | 7 | 9 | 16 | 58 |
| Ed Kullman | 70 | 4 | 10 | 14 | 44 |
| Ivan Irwin | 56 | 2 | 12 | 14 | 109 |
| Ike Hildebrand^{‡} | 31 | 6 | 7 | 13 | 12 |
| Doug Bentley | 20 | 2 | 10 | 12 | 2 |
| Bob Chrystal | 64 | 5 | 5 | 10 | 44 |
| Jack Evans | 44 | 4 | 4 | 8 | 73 |
| Leo Reise Jr. | 70 | 3 | 5 | 8 | 71 |
| Aldo Guidolin | 68 | 2 | 6 | 8 | 51 |
| Edgar Laprade | 35 | 1 | 6 | 7 | 2 |
| Andy Bathgate | 20 | 2 | 2 | 4 | 18 |
| Ron Murphy | 27 | 1 | 3 | 4 | 20 |
| Glen Sonmor | 15 | 2 | 0 | 2 | 17 |
| Billy Dea | 14 | 1 | 1 | 2 | 2 |
| Allan Stanley | 10 | 0 | 2 | 2 | 11 |
| Vic Howe | 1 | 0 | 0 | 0 | 0 |
| William Chalmers | 1 | 0 | 0 | 0 | 0 |
| Aggie Kukulowicz | 1 | 0 | 0 | 0 | 0 |
| Bill McCreary | 2 | 0 | 0 | 0 | 2 |

Goaltenders

Regular season
| Player | GP | TOI | W | L | T | GA | GAA | SO |
|---|---|---|---|---|---|---|---|---|
| Johnny Bower | 70 | 4200 | 29 | 31 | 10 | 182 | 2.60 | 5 |

^{†}Denotes player spent time with another team before joining Rangers. Stats reflect time with Rangers only.
^{‡}Traded mid-season. Stats reflect time with Rangers only.

Note:

Pos = Position;GP = Games played; G = Goals; A = Assists; Pts = Points; PIM = Penalty minutes; +/- = Plus/minus; PPG = Power-play goals; SHG = Short-handed goals; GWG = Game-winning goals
Pos = Position;GP = Games played; Min, TOI = Minutes played; W = Wins; L = Losses; T,T/OT = Ties; OTL = Overtime losses; GA = Goals-against; GAA = Goals-against average; SO = Shutouts; SA = Shots against; SV = Shots saved;SV% = Save percentage;
