= 1953–54 Detroit Red Wings season =

Sports season

1953–54 Detroit Red Wings
- Stanley Cup champions
- Prince of Wales Trophy winners
- League: 1st NHL
- 1953–54 record: 37–19–14
- Home record: 24–4–7
- Road record: 13–15–7
- Goals for: 191
- Goals against: 132

Team information
- General manager: Jack Adams
- Coach: Tommy Ivan
- Captain: Ted Lindsay
- Alternate captains: Bob Goldham; Red Kelly; Marty Pavelich
- Arena: Olympia Stadium

Team leaders
- Goals: Gordie Howe (33)
- Assists: Gordie Howe (48)
- Points: Gordie Howe (81)
- Penalty minutes: Ted Lindsay (110)
- Wins: Terry Sawchuk (35)
- Goals against average: Terry Sawchuk (1.93)

The 1953–54 Detroit Red Wings season was the Red Wings' 28th season. The highlight of season was winning the Stanley Cup.

== Regular season ==
=== Prison game ===
On February 2, 1954, the Red Wings played an exhibition game against Marquette Branch Prison on an outdoor ice surface.

=== Final standings ===
National Hockey League
| | | GP | W | L | T | GF | GA | DIFF | Pts |
|---|---|---|---|---|---|---|---|---|---|
| 1 | Detroit Red Wings | 70 | 37 | 19 | 14 | 191 | 132 | +59 | 88 |
| 2 | Montreal Canadiens | 70 | 35 | 24 | 11 | 195 | 141 | +54 | 81 |
| 3 | Toronto Maple Leafs | 70 | 32 | 24 | 14 | 152 | 131 | +21 | 78 |
| 4 | Boston Bruins | 70 | 32 | 28 | 10 | 177 | 181 | −4 | 74 |
| 5 | New York Rangers | 70 | 29 | 31 | 10 | 161 | 182 | −21 | 68 |
| 6 | Chicago Black Hawks | 70 | 12 | 51 | 7 | 133 | 242 | −109 | 31 |

=== Record vs. opponents ===
1953–54 NHL Records
| Team | BOS | CHI | DET | MTL | NYR | TOR |
|---|---|---|---|---|---|---|
| Boston | — | 11–1–2 | 3–8–3 | 4–6–4 | 7–7 | 7–6–1 |
| Chicago | 1–11–2 | — | 2–11–1 | 3–9–2 | 3–9–2 | 3–11 |
| Detroit | 8–3–3 | 11–2–1 | — | 6–6–2 | 6–5–3 | 6–3–5 |
| Montreal | 6–4–4 | 9–3–2 | 6–6–2 | — | 9–5 | 5–6–3 |
| New York | 7–7 | 9–3–2 | 5–6–3 | 5–9 | — | 3–6–5 |
| Toronto | 6–7–1 | 11–3 | 3–6–5 | 6–5–3 | 6–3–5 | — |

== Schedule and results ==
1953–54 regular season
October

| Game | Result | Date | Score | Opponent | Record |
|---|---|---|---|---|---|
| 1 | W | October 8, 1953 | 4–1 | New York Rangers (1953–54) | 1–0–0 |
| 2 | L | October 10, 1953 | 1–4 | @ Montreal Canadiens (1953–54) | 1–1–0 |
| 3 | W | October 11, 1953 | 4–0 | Toronto Maple Leafs (1953–54) | 2–1–0 |
| 4 | T | October 16, 1953 | 2–2 | @ Chicago Black Hawks (1953–54) | 2–1–1 |
| 5 | W | October 17, 1953 | 2–1 | Chicago Black Hawks (1953–54) | 3–1–1 |
| 6 | W | October 18, 1953 | 4–0 | Montreal Canadiens (1953–54) | 4–1–1 |
| 7 | T | October 21, 1953 | 1–1 | @ Toronto Maple Leafs (1953–54) | 4–1–2 |
| 8 | L | October 24, 1953 | 0–1 | @ Montreal Canadiens (1953–54) | 4–2–2 |
| 9 | W | October 25, 1953 | 2–0 | Toronto Maple Leafs (1953–54) | 5–2–2 |
| 10 | L | October 31, 1953 | 1–3 | Boston Bruins (1953–54) | 5–3–2 |

November

| Game | Result | Date | Score | Opponent | Record |
|---|---|---|---|---|---|
| 11 | W | November 1, 1953 | 5–1 | Montreal Canadiens (1953–54) | 6–3–2 |
| 12 | T | November 7, 1953 | 2–2 | @ Toronto Maple Leafs (1953–54) | 6–3–3 |
| 13 | T | November 8, 1953 | 2–2 | New York Rangers (1953–54) | 6–3–4 |
| 14 | T | November 11, 1953 | 2–2 | @ Boston Bruins (1953–54) | 6–3–5 |
| 15 | W | November 14, 1953 | 3–2 | @ New York Rangers (1953–54) | 7–3–5 |
| 16 | W | November 15, 1953 | 4–1 | New York Rangers (1953–54) | 8–3–5 |
| 17 | W | November 19, 1953 | 3–2 | Boston Bruins (1953–54) | 9–3–5 |
| 18 | L | November 21, 1953 | 0–1 | @ Montreal Canadiens (1953–54) | 9–4–5 |
| 19 | W | November 22, 1953 | 3–2 | @ New York Rangers (1953–54) | 10–4–5 |
| 20 | W | November 26, 1953 | 2–0 | Toronto Maple Leafs (1953–54) | 11–4–5 |
| 21 | W | November 28, 1953 | 9–0 | Chicago Black Hawks (1953–54) | 12–4–5 |
| 22 | W | November 29, 1953 | 9–4 | @ Chicago Black Hawks (1953–54) | 13–4–5 |

December

| Game | Result | Date | Score | Opponent | Record |
|---|---|---|---|---|---|
| 23 | W | December 3, 1953 | 4–0 | New York Rangers (1953–54) | 14–4–5 |
| 24 | L | December 5, 1953 | 0–3 | @ Toronto Maple Leafs (1953–54) | 14–5–5 |
| 25 | L | December 6, 1953 | 0–5 | Chicago Black Hawks (1953–54) | 14–6–5 |
| 26 | T | December 9, 1953 | 3–3 | @ New York Rangers (1953–54) | 14–6–6 |
| 27 | L | December 10, 1953 | 3–6 | @ Boston Bruins (1953–54) | 14–7–6 |
| 28 | W | December 12, 1953 | 7–1 | Boston Bruins (1953–54) | 15–7–6 |
| 29 | W | December 13, 1953 | 4–3 | Montreal Canadiens (1953–54) | 16–7–6 |
| 30 | W | December 17, 1953 | 5–1 | Chicago Black Hawks (1953–54) | 17–7–6 |
| 31 | W | December 18, 1953 | 3–1 | @ Chicago Black Hawks (1953–54) | 18–7–6 |
| 32 | W | December 20, 1953 | 4–2 | @ Boston Bruins (1953–54) | 19–7–6 |
| 33 | L | December 23, 1953 | 1–2 | @ New York Rangers (1953–54) | 19–8–6 |
| 34 | L | December 26, 1953 | 2–4 | @ Toronto Maple Leafs (1953–54) | 19–9–6 |
| 35 | W | December 27, 1953 | 2–1 | Boston Bruins (1953–54) | 20–9–6 |
| 36 | T | December 31, 1953 | 2–2 | Montreal Canadiens (1953–54) | 20–9–7 |

January

| Game | Result | Date | Score | Opponent | Record |
|---|---|---|---|---|---|
| 37 | L | January 1, 1954 | 2–4 | @ Chicago Black Hawks (1953–54) | 20–10–7 |
| 38 | T | January 3, 1954 | 0–0 | Toronto Maple Leafs (1953–54) | 20–10–8 |
| 39 | W | January 7, 1954 | 3–1 | Boston Bruins (1953–54) | 21–10–8 |
| 40 | W | January 10, 1954 | 2–1 | Montreal Canadiens (1953–54) | 22–10–8 |
| 41 | W | January 13, 1954 | 3–1 | @ New York Rangers (1953–54) | 23–10–8 |
| 42 | W | January 14, 1954 | 2–1 | @ Boston Bruins (1953–54) | 24–10–8 |
| 43 | L | January 17, 1954 | 2–3 | New York Rangers (1953–54) | 24–11–8 |
| 44 | W | January 21, 1954 | 1–0 | @ Montreal Canadiens (1953–54) | 25–11–8 |
| 45 | L | January 23, 1954 | 1–4 | @ Toronto Maple Leafs (1953–54) | 25–12–8 |
| 46 | W | January 24, 1954 | 2–0 | Toronto Maple Leafs (1953–54) | 26–12–8 |
| 47 | T | January 28, 1954 | 3–3 | New York Rangers (1953–54) | 26–12–9 |
| 48 | W | January 30, 1954 | 4–2 | Chicago Black Hawks (1953–54) | 27–12–9 |
| 49 | W | January 31, 1954 | 5–1 | @ Chicago Black Hawks (1953–54) | 28–12–9 |

February

| Game | Result | Date | Score | Opponent | Record |
|---|---|---|---|---|---|
| 50 | W | February 4, 1954 | 5–0 | Boston Bruins (1953–54) | 29–12–9 |
| 51 | W | February 6, 1954 | 4–2 | @ Boston Bruins (1953–54) | 30–12–9 |
| 52 | T | February 7, 1954 | 1–1 | @ Boston Bruins (1953–54) | 30–12–10 |
| 53 | L | February 10, 1954 | 2–3 | @ New York Rangers (1953–54) | 30–13–10 |
| 54 | W | February 14, 1954 | 5–0 | @ Chicago Black Hawks (1953–54) | 31–13–10 |
| 55 | W | February 15, 1954 | 3–2 | Chicago Black Hawks (1953–54) | 32–13–10 |
| 56 | T | February 17, 1954 | 0–0 | @ Toronto Maple Leafs (1953–54) | 32–13–11 |
| 57 | L | February 18, 1954 | 2–4 | @ Montreal Canadiens (1953–54) | 32–14–11 |
| 58 | L | February 20, 1954 | 0–2 | @ Montreal Canadiens (1953–54) | 32–15–11 |
| 59 | W | February 22, 1954 | 3–0 | Montreal Canadiens (1953–54) | 33–15–11 |
| 60 | W | February 25, 1954 | 3–2 | @ Chicago Black Hawks (1953–54) | 34–15–11 |

March

| Game | Result | Date | Score | Opponent | Record |
|---|---|---|---|---|---|
| 61 | T | March 4, 1954 | 3–3 | Toronto Maple Leafs (1953–54) | 34–15–12 |
| 62 | W | March 6, 1954 | 3–1 | @ Toronto Maple Leafs (1953–54) | 35–15–12 |
| 63 | T | March 7, 1954 | 2–2 | Montreal Canadiens (1953–54) | 35–15–13 |
| 64 | W | March 11, 1954 | 6–2 | Chicago Black Hawks (1953–54) | 36–15–13 |
| 65 | L | March 13, 1954 | 2–5 | New York Rangers (1953–54) | 36–16–13 |
| 66 | L | March 14, 1954 | 0–2 | @ New York Rangers (1953–54) | 36–17–13 |
| 67 | L | March 16, 1954 | 2–4 | @ Boston Bruins (1953–54) | 36–18–13 |
| 68 | T | March 18, 1954 | 3–3 | Boston Bruins (1953–54) | 36–18–14 |
| 69 | L | March 20, 1954 | 1–6 | @ Montreal Canadiens (1953–54) | 36–19–14 |
| 70 | W | March 21, 1954 | 6–1 | Toronto Maple Leafs (1953–54) | 37–19–14 |

Legend: Win (2 points) Loss (0 points) Tie (1 point)

== Playoffs ==
=== Stanley Cup Finals ===
| Date | Away | Score | Home | Score | Notes |
|---|---|---|---|---|---|
| April 4 | Montreal | 1 | Detroit | 3 | |
| April 6 | Montreal | 3 | Detroit | 1 | |
| April 8 | Detroit | 5 | Montreal | 2 | |
| April 10 | Detroit | 2 | Montreal | 0 | |
| April 11 | Montreal | 1 | Detroit | 0 | OT |
| April 13 | Detroit | 1 | Montreal | 4 | |
| April 16 | Montreal | 1 | Detroit | 2 | OT |

Detroit wins best-of-seven series 4 games to 3

== Player statistics ==
=== Regular season ===
Scoring

| Player | Pos | GP | G | A | Pts | PIM |
|---|---|---|---|---|---|---|
| Gordie Howe | RW | 70 | 33 | 48 | 81 | 109 |
| Ted Lindsay | LW | 70 | 26 | 36 | 62 | 110 |
| Red Kelly | D/C | 62 | 16 | 33 | 49 | 18 |
| Dutch Reibel | C | 69 | 15 | 33 | 48 | 18 |
| Johnny Wilson | LW | 70 | 17 | 17 | 34 | 22 |
| Alex Delvecchio | C/LW | 69 | 11 | 18 | 29 | 34 |
| Marty Pavelich | LW | 65 | 9 | 20 | 29 | 57 |
| Glen Skov | C/LW | 70 | 17 | 10 | 27 | 95 |
| Metro Prystai | C | 70 | 12 | 15 | 27 | 26 |
| Bill Dineen | RW | 70 | 17 | 8 | 25 | 34 |
| Tony Leswick | W | 70 | 6 | 18 | 24 | 90 |
| Marcel Pronovost | D | 57 | 6 | 12 | 18 | 50 |
| Bob Goldham | D | 69 | 1 | 15 | 16 | 50 |
| Vic Stasiuk | LW | 42 | 5 | 2 | 7 | 4 |
| Keith Allen | D | 10 | 0 | 4 | 4 | 2 |
| Jimmy Peters | RW | 25 | 0 | 4 | 4 | 10 |
| Benny Woit | RW/D | 70 | 0 | 2 | 2 | 38 |
| Al Arbour | D | 36 | 0 | 1 | 1 | 18 |
| Terry Sawchuk | G | 67 | 0 | 1 | 1 | 31 |
| Marcel Bonin | W | 1 | 0 | 0 | 0 | 0 |
| Dave Gatherum | G | 3 | 0 | 0 | 0 | 0 |
| Jim Hay | D | 12 | 0 | 0 | 0 | 0 |
| Earl Johnson | LW | 1 | 0 | 0 | 0 | 0 |
| Ed Stankiewicz | C | 1 | 0 | 0 | 0 | 2 |
| Lefty Wilson | G | 1 | 0 | 0 | 0 | 0 |

Goaltending

| Player | MIN | GP | W | L | T | GA | GAA | SO |
|---|---|---|---|---|---|---|---|---|
| Terry Sawchuk | 4004 | 67 | 35 | 19 | 13 | 129 | 1.93 | 12 |
| Dave Gatherum | 180 | 3 | 2 | 0 | 1 | 3 | 1.00 | 1 |
| Lefty Wilson | 16 | 1 | 0 | 0 | 0 | 0 | 0.00 | 0 |
| Team: | 4200 | 70 | 37 | 19 | 14 | 132 | 1.89 | 13 |

=== Playoffs ===
Scoring

| Player | Pos | GP | G | A | Pts | PIM |
|---|---|---|---|---|---|---|
| Gordie Howe | RW | 12 | 4 | 5 | 9 | 31 |
| Alex Delvecchio | C/LW | 12 | 2 | 7 | 9 | 7 |
| Ted Lindsay | LW | 12 | 4 | 4 | 8 | 14 |
| Red Kelly | D/C | 12 | 5 | 1 | 6 | 0 |
| Marcel Pronovost | D | 12 | 2 | 3 | 5 | 12 |
| Metro Prystai | C | 12 | 2 | 3 | 5 | 0 |
| Tony Leswick | W | 12 | 3 | 1 | 4 | 18 |
| Marty Pavelich | LW | 12 | 2 | 2 | 4 | 4 |
| Dutch Reibel | C | 9 | 1 | 3 | 4 | 0 |
| Johnny Wilson | LW | 12 | 3 | 0 | 3 | 0 |
| Glen Skov | C/LW | 12 | 1 | 2 | 3 | 16 |
| Bob Goldham | D | 12 | 0 | 2 | 2 | 2 |
| Benny Woit | RW/D | 12 | 0 | 1 | 1 | 8 |
| Keith Allen | D | 5 | 0 | 0 | 0 | 0 |
| Bill Dineen | RW | 12 | 0 | 0 | 0 | 2 |
| Gilles Dube | LW | 2 | 0 | 0 | 0 | 0 |
| Jimmy Peters | RW | 10 | 0 | 0 | 0 | 0 |
| Terry Sawchuk | G | 12 | 0 | 0 | 0 | 2 |

Goaltending

| Player | MIN | GP | W | L | GA | GAA | SO |
|---|---|---|---|---|---|---|---|
| Terry Sawchuk | 751 | 12 | 8 | 4 | 20 | 1.60 | 2 |
| Team: | 751 | 12 | 8 | 4 | 20 | 1.60 | 2 |

Note: Pos = Position; GP = Games played; G = Goals; A = Assists; Pts = Points; PIM = Penalty minutes; PPG = Power-play goals; SHG = Short-handed goals; GWG = Game-winning goals
MIN = Minutes played; W = Wins; L = Losses; T = Ties; GA = Goals-against; GAA = Goals-against average; SO = Shutouts;

== Awards and records ==
- Prince of Wales Trophy: || Detroit Red Wings
- Art Ross Trophy: || Gordie Howe, Detroit Red Wings
- James Norris Memorial Trophy: || Red Kelly, Detroit Red Wings
- Lady Byng Memorial Trophy: || Red Kelly, Detroit Red Wings
- Gordie Howe, Right Wing, NHL First Team All-Star
- Red Kelly, Defense, NHL First Team All-Star
- Ted Lindsay, Left Wing, NHL First Team All-Star
- Terry Sawchuk, Goaltender, NHL Second Team All-Star
