= Gerry Desaulniers =

Canadian ice hockey player

- Born: December 31, 1928; Shawinigan Falls, Quebec, Canada
- Died: November 26, 1984 (aged 55)
- Height: 5 ft 11 in (180 cm)
- Weight: 152 lb (69 kg; 10 st 12 lb)
- Position: Centre
- Shot: Left
- Played for: Montreal Canadiens
- Playing career: 1949–1960

Joseph Gerard Desaulniers (December 31, 1928 – November 26, 1984) was a Canadian professional ice hockey forward who played 8 games in the National Hockey League for the Montreal Canadiens from 1950 to 1953. The rest of his career, which lasted from 1949 to 1960, was spent in the minor leagues. Desaulniers was born in Shawinigan Falls, Quebec.

== Career statistics ==
=== Regular season and playoffs ===
			Regular season					Playoffs
Season	Team	League	GP	G	A	Pts	PIM	GP	G	A	Pts	PIM
1946–47	Laval Titan	QJHL	—	—	—	—	—	—	—	—	—	—
1947–48	Laval Titan	QJHL	32	21	27	48	26	12	15	6	21	6
1947–48	Laval Titan	M-Cup	—	—	—	—	—	8	5	5	10	6
1948–49	Laval Titan	QJHL	48	41	34	75	57	9	2	11	13	14
1948–49	Montreal Royals	QSHL	3	0	0	0	0	8	0	4	4	2
1949–50	Montreal Royals	QSHL	59	21	34	55	49	6	2	2	4	4
1950–51	Montreal Canadiens	NHL	3	0	1	1	2	—	—	—	—	—
1950–51	Montreal Royals	QSHL	51	24	26	50	30	7	0	3	3	2
1951–52	Montreal Royals	QSHL	57	19	23	42	33	7	1	1	2	0
1952–53	Montreal Canadiens	NHL	2	0	1	1	2	—	—	—	—	—
1952–53	Montreal Royals	QSHL	45	13	22	35	18	16	3	10	13	4
1953–54	Montreal Canadiens	NHL	3	0	0	0	0	—	—	—	—	—
1953–54	Montreal Royals	QSHL	66	11	26	37	31	11	4	4	8	0
1954–55	Shawinigan Falls Cataractes	QSHL	61	31	30	61	10	11	5	5	10	4
1955–56	Shawinigan Falls Cataractes	QSHL	62	14	23	37	35	11	7	3	10	0
1956–57	Shawinigan Falls Cataractes	QSHL	68	20	29	49	18	—	—	—	—	—
1957–58	Shawinigan Falls Cataractes	QSHL	58	14	24	38	12	14	4	7	11	6
1958–59	Trois-Rivières Lions	QSHL	60	17	24	41	12	8	6	1	7	0
1959–60	Trois-Rivières Lions	EPHL	56	13	28	41	6	—	—	—	—	—
QSHL totals			375	107	156	263	118	55	26	20	46	10
NHL totals			8	0	2	2	4	—	—	—	—	—
