= 1953–54 Chicago Black Hawks season =

NHL ice hockey team season

1953–54 Chicago Black Hawks
- League: 6th NHL
- 1953–54 record: 12–51–7
- Home record: 8–21–6
- Road record: 4–30–1
- Goals for: 133
- Goals against: 242

Team information
- General manager: Bill Tobin
- Coach: Sid Abel
- Captain: Bill Gadsby
- Arena: Chicago Stadium

Team leaders
- Goals: Pete Conacher (19)
- Assists: Larry Wilson (33)
- Points: Larry Wilson (42)
- Penalty minutes: Gus Mortson (132)
- Wins: Al Rollins (12)
- Goals against average: Al Rollins (3.23)

The 1953–54 Chicago Black Hawks season was the team's 28th season in the NHL, and they were coming off of a successful season in 1952–53, in which the team set team records in wins (27) and points (69), while earning their first playoff berth since the 1945–46 season. The Hawks lost to the Montreal Canadiens in seven games in the NHL semi-finals.

The Black Hawks were looking to build on their newfound success, however, the club would open the season with a record of 0–7–1 to quickly fall into last place in the NHL standings. Wins would be few and far between for the club, as they won consecutive games only thrice throughout the season, and finished the year dead last in the league with a 12–51–7 record, earning 31 points. The 12 wins was Chicago's fewest since the 1938–39 season, while the 31 points was their lowest total since the 1928–29 season.

Their worst defeat of the season was a 12–1 away loss to the Canadiens at the Montréal Forum in which Bert Olmstead tied an NHL record with eight points (four goals and four assists) on January 9, 1954.

Offensively, Chicago was led by Larry Wilson, who had a team high 33 assists and 42 points, while Pete Conacher scored a club best 19 goals. Defenceman and team captain Bill Gadsby had a career season, scoring 12 goals and 41 points, while getting 108 penalty minutes. Fellow defenceman Gus Mortson led the team with 132 penalty minutes.

In goal, Al Rollins played in 66 games, winning 12 games, while posting a 3.23 GAA with seven shutouts and 47 losses. He was awarded the Hart Trophy for his efforts. Rollins finished first in voting for the award ahead of Detroit's Red Kelly and Montréal's Maurice Richard.

== Season standings ==
National Hockey League
		GP	W	L	T	GF	GA	DIFF	Pts
1	Detroit Red Wings	70	37	19	14	191	132	+59	88
2	Montreal Canadiens	70	35	24	11	195	141	+54	81
3	Toronto Maple Leafs	70	32	24	14	152	131	+21	78
4	Boston Bruins	70	32	28	10	177	181	−4	74
5	New York Rangers	70	29	31	10	161	182	−21	68
6	Chicago Black Hawks	70	12	51	7	133	242	−109	31

=== Record vs. opponents ===
1953–54 NHL Records
Team	BOS	CHI	DET	MTL	NYR	TOR
Boston	—	11–1–2	3–8–3	4–6–4	7–7	7–6–1
Chicago	1–11–2	—	2–11–1	3–9–2	3–9–2	3–11
Detroit	8–3–3	11–2–1	—	6–6–2	6–5–3	6–3–5
Montreal	6–4–4	9–3–2	6–6–2	—	9–5	5–6–3
New York	7–7	9–3–2	5–6–3	5–9	—	3–6–5
Toronto	6–7–1	11–3	3–6–5	6–5–3	6–3–5	—

== Schedule and results ==
1953–54 regular season
October

Game	Date	Visitor	Score	Home	Record	Points
1	October 8	Chicago Black Hawks	0–3	Montreal Canadiens	0–1–0	0
2	October 10	Chicago Black Hawks	2–6	Toronto Maple Leafs	0–2–0	0
3	October 11	New York Rangers	5–3	Chicago Black Hawks	0–3–0	0
4	October 16	Detroit Red Wings	2–2	Chicago Black Hawks	0–3–1	1
5	October 17	Chicago Black Hawks	1–2	Detroit Red Wings	0–4–1	1
6	October 18	Toronto Maple Leafs	2–1	Chicago Black Hawks	0–5–1	1
7	October 22	Montreal Canadiens	3–2	Chicago Black Hawks	0–6–1	1
8	October 25	Boston Bruins	4–3	Chicago Black Hawks	0–7–1	1
9	October 28	Chicago Black Hawks	6–1	New York Rangers	1–7–1	3
10	October 31	Montreal Canadiens	0–1	Chicago Black Hawks	2–7–1	5

November

Game	Date	Visitor	Score	Home	Record	Points
11	November 1	Boston Bruins	0–0	Chicago Black Hawks	2–7–2	6
12	November 4	Chicago Black Hawks	1–3	Toronto Maple Leafs	2–8–2	6
13	November 5	Chicago Black Hawks	2–4	Boston Bruins	2–9–2	6
14	November 7	New York Rangers	3–1	Chicago Black Hawks	2–10–2	6
15	November 8	Toronto Maple Leafs	2–1	Chicago Black Hawks	2–11–2	6
16	November 11	Chicago Black Hawks	2–3	New York Rangers	2–12–2	6
17	November 12	Chicago Black Hawks	2–4	Montreal Canadiens	2–13–2	6
18	November 14	Chicago Black Hawks	3–2	Montreal Canadiens	3–13–2	8
19	November 15	Montreal Canadiens	2–2	Chicago Black Hawks	3–13–3	9
20	November 18	Chicago Black Hawks	1–3	New York Rangers	3–14–3	9
21	November 20	Boston Bruins	2–0	Chicago Black Hawks	3–15–3	9
22	November 22	Toronto Maple Leafs	5–1	Chicago Black Hawks	3–16–3	9
23	November 26	Montreal Canadiens	6–3	Chicago Black Hawks	3–17–3	9
24	November 28	Chicago Black Hawks	0–9	Detroit Red Wings	3–18–3	9
25	November 29	Detroit Red Wings	9–4	Chicago Black Hawks	3–19–3	9

December

Game	Date	Visitor	Score	Home	Record	Points
26	December 2	Chicago Black Hawks	3–3	New York Rangers	3–19–4	10
27	December 3	Chicago Black Hawks	1–3	Boston Bruins	3–20–4	10
28	December 5	New York Rangers	1–2	Chicago Black Hawks	4–20–4	12
29	December 6	Chicago Black Hawks	5–0	Detroit Red Wings	5–20–4	14
30	December 10	Chicago Black Hawks	3–5	Montreal Canadiens	5–21–4	14
31	December 12	Chicago Black Hawks	0–2	Toronto Maple Leafs	5–22–4	14
32	December 13	Boston Bruins	2–2	Chicago Black Hawks	5–22–5	15
33	December 17	Chicago Black Hawks	1–5	Detroit Red Wings	5–23–5	15
34	December 18	Detroit Red Wings	5–3	Chicago Black Hawks	5–24–5	15
35	December 20	Toronto Maple Leafs	1–4	Chicago Black Hawks	6–24–5	17
36	December 25	Chicago Black Hawks	1–4	Boston Bruins	6–25–5	17
37	December 27	Chicago Black Hawks	4–1	New York Rangers	7–25–5	19

January

Game	Date	Visitor	Score	Home	Record	Points
38	January 1	Detroit Red Wings	2–4	Chicago Black Hawks	8–25–5	21
39	January 2	Chicago Black Hawks	0–4	Toronto Maple Leafs	8–26–5	21
40	January 6	Chicago Black Hawks	3–4	New York Rangers	8–27–5	21
41	January 9	Chicago Black Hawks	1–12	Montreal Canadiens	8–28–5	21
42	January 10	Chicago Black Hawks	3–5	Boston Bruins	8–29–5	21
43	January 13	Chicago Black Hawks	1–2	Toronto Maple Leafs	8–30–5	21
44	January 14	New York Rangers	2–0	Chicago Black Hawks	8–31–5	21
45	January 17	Toronto Maple Leafs	3–1	Chicago Black Hawks	8–32–5	21
46	January 21	Boston Bruins	3–2	Chicago Black Hawks	8–33–5	21
47	January 23	Chicago Black Hawks	1–5	Montreal Canadiens	8–34–5	21
48	January 24	Montreal Canadiens	3–8	Chicago Black Hawks	9–34–5	23
49	January 28	Chicago Black Hawks	2–3	Boston Bruins	9–35–5	23
50	January 30	Chicago Black Hawks	2–4	Detroit Red Wings	9–36–5	23
51	January 31	Detroit Red Wings	5–1	Chicago Black Hawks	9–37–5	23

February

Game	Date	Visitor	Score	Home	Record	Points
52	February 4	New York Rangers	3–2	Chicago Black Hawks	9–38–5	23
53	February 6	Chicago Black Hawks	0–6	Toronto Maple Leafs	9–39–5	23
54	February 7	Toronto Maple Leafs	1–2	Chicago Black Hawks	10–39–5	25
55	February 11	Montreal Canadiens	2–2	Chicago Black Hawks	10–39–6	26
56	February 14	Detroit Red Wings	5–0	Chicago Black Hawks	10–40–6	26
57	February 15	Chicago Black Hawks	2–3	Detroit Red Wings	10–41–6	26
58	February 19	New York Rangers	3–0	Chicago Black Hawks	10–42–6	26
59	February 21	Boston Bruins	4–3	Chicago Black Hawks	10–43–6	26
60	February 25	Detroit Red Wings	3–2	Chicago Black Hawks	10–44–6	26
61	February 27	Chicago Black Hawks	2–4	Toronto Maple Leafs	10–45–6	26
62	February 28	Toronto Maple Leafs	1–2	Chicago Black Hawks	11–45–6	28

March

Game	Date	Visitor	Score	Home	Record	Points
63	March 5	New York Rangers	0–0	Chicago Black Hawks	11–45–7	29
64	March 7	Chicago Black Hawks	0–6	Boston Bruins	11–46–7	29
65	March 10	Chicago Black Hawks	2–4	New York Rangers	11–47–7	29
66	March 11	Chicago Black Hawks	2–6	Detroit Red Wings	11–48–7	29
67	March 13	Chicago Black Hawks	0–4	Montreal Canadiens	11–49–7	29
68	March 14	Montreal Canadiens	6–0	Chicago Black Hawks	11–50–7	29
69	March 19	Boston Bruins	0–7	Chicago Black Hawks	12–50–7	31
70	March 21	Chicago Black Hawks	5–9	Boston Bruins	12–51–7	31

Legend: Win (2 points) Loss (0 points) Tie (1 point)

== Season stats ==
=== Scoring leaders ===
Player	GP	G	A	Pts	PIM
Larry Wilson	66	9	33	42	22
Bill Gadsby	70	12	29	41	108
Bill Mosienko	65	15	19	34	17
Pete Conacher	70	19	9	28	23
Lou Jankowski	68	15	13	28	7

=== Goaltending ===
Player	GP	TOI	W	L	T	GA	SO	GAA
Al Rollins	66	3960	12	47	7	213	5	3.23
Jean Marois	2	120	0	2	0	11	0	5.50
Jack Gelineau	2	120	0	2	0	18	0	9.00

== Sources ==
- Hockey-Reference
- National Hockey League Guide & Record Book 2007
