= Eddie Mazur =

Canadian ice hockey player

- Born: July 25, 1929 Winnipeg, Manitoba, Canada
- Died: July 3, 1995 (aged 65) Winnipeg, Manitoba, Canada
- Height: 6 ft 2 in (188 cm)
- Weight: 186 lb (84 kg; 13 st 4 lb)
- Position: Defence/Left wing
- Shot: Left
- Played for: Chicago Black Hawks; Montreal Canadiens
- Playing career: 1948–1965

Edward Joseph "Spider" Mazur (July 25, 1929 – July 3, 1995) was a Canadian ice hockey forward. He played in the National Hockey League with the Montreal Canadiens and Chicago Black Hawks between 1951 and 1956. The rest of his career, which lasted from 1948 to 1966, was spent in the minor leagues.

== Playing career ==
Mazur started his National Hockey League career with the Montreal Canadiens in 1951. He played in the 1951, 1952 and 1953 playoffs for the Canadiens prior to ever playing a regular season game in the NHL. He became the first player in NHL history to score four playoff goals prior to playing a regular season game. Chris Kreider of the New York Rangers exceeded that mark with five goals in the 2012 postseason. He would also play with the Chicago Black Hawks. He would leave the NHL after the 1957 season. He retired from hockey in 1965. He won the Stanley Cup in 1953 with the Montreal Canadiens.

== Career statistics ==
=== Regular season and playoffs ===
			Regular season					Playoffs
Season	Team	League	GP	G	A	Pts	PIM	GP	G	A	Pts	PIM
1947–48	Winnipeg Monarchs	MJHL	11	5	5	10	0	6	2	0	2	2
1947–48	Winnipeg Monarchs	M-Cup	—	—	—	—	—	4	2	3	5	2
1948–49	Dallas Texans	USHL	66	10	20	30	48	4	1	1	2	0
1949–50	Vancouver Canucks	PCHL	65	33	26	59	17	—	—	—	—	—
1950–51	Vancouver Canucks	PCHL	70	43	30	73	41	12	4	6	10	8
1950–51	Montreal Canadiens	NHL	—	—	—	—	—	2	0	0	0	0
1951–52	Buffalo Bisons	AHL	60	19	18	37	55	1	0	1	1	2
1951–52	Montreal Canadiens	NHL	—	—	—	—	—	5	2	0	2	4
1952–53	Vancouver Canucks	WHL	51	20	18	38	54	—	—	—	—	—
1952–53	Montreal Canadiens	NHL	—	—	—	—	—	7	2	2	4	9
1953–54	Montreal Canadiens	NHL	67	7	14	21	95	11	0	3	3	7
1954–55	Montreal Canadiens	NHL	25	1	5	6	21	—	—	—	—	—
1954–55	Montreal Royals	QSHL	19	4	8	12	16	14	8	5	13	27
1955–56	Winnipeg Warriors	WHL	70	34	30	64	72	14	6	11	17	16
1956–57	Chicago Black Hawks	NHL	15	0	1	1	2	—	—	—	—	—
1956–57	Rochester Americans	AHL	47	24	40	64	90	10	3	9	12	18
1957–58	Rochester Americans	AHL	59	22	40	64	90	10	3	9	12	18
1958–59	Cleveland Barons	AHL	70	34	44	78	54	7	2	2	4	8
1959–60	Cleveland Barons	AHL	61	29	24	53	79	7	2	4	6	24
1960–61	Cleveland Barons	AHL	72	30	39	69	73	4	1	0	1	17
1961–62	Cleveland Barons	AHL	70	24	24	48	44	6	0	0	0	4
1962–63	Providence Reds	AHL	72	18	33	51	72	4	1	0	1	8
1963–64	Providence Reds	AHL	64	23	33	56	56	3	1	4	5	6
1964–65	Victoria Maple Leafs	WHL	62	16	30	46	97	11	1	0	1	6
1965–66	Gander Flyers	NFSHL	25	22	37	59	23	—	—	—	—	—
AHL totals			575	223	280	503	590	42	10	20	30	87
NHL totals			107	8	20	28	118	25	4	5	9	20

== Awards and achievements ==
- Turnbull Cup MJHL Championship (1948)
- PCHL Northern Second All-Star Team (1950)
- PCHL Second All-Star Team (1951)
- PCHL Championship (1951)
- Stanley Cup Championship (1953)
- AHL Second All-Star Team (1957 & 1959)
- Played in NHL All-Star Game (1953)
- WHL Championship (1956)
- Inducted into the Manitoba Sports Hall of Fame and Museum in 1995
- Honoured Member of the Manitoba Hockey Hall of Fame
