= Bob Armstrong (ice hockey, born 1931) =

Canadian ice hockey player (born 1931)

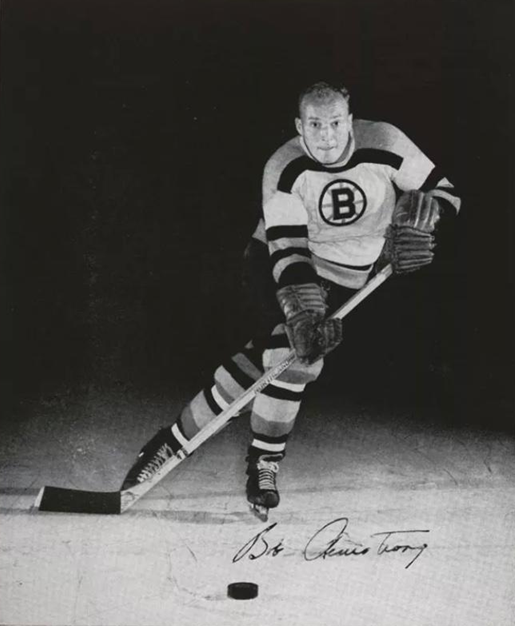
- Born: April 7, 1931 Toronto, Ontario, Canada
- Died: November 6, 1990 (aged 59)
- Height: 6 ft 1 in (185 cm)
- Weight: 190 lb (86 kg; 13 st 8 lb)
- Position: Defence
- Shot: Right
- Played for: Boston Bruins
- Playing career: 1951–1962

Robert Richard Armstrong (April 7, 1931 – November 6, 1990) was a Canadian professional ice hockey defenceman. He played in the National Hockey League with the Boston Bruins between 1951 and 1961.

== Career ==
Armstrong played junior hockey with the Stratford Kroehlers and broke into the NHL with the Boston Bruins in the 1950–51 season. Armstrong was known as a hard-hitting defenceman and could be found on the Boston blueline for every one of his 542 career NHL games. He was involved in many fights and made it to the Stanley Cup Final three times, in 1953, 1957 and 1958. His team never won, however, losing each time to the Montreal Canadiens.

He went on to be a master at Lakefield College School and died on November 6, 1990.

== Career statistics ==
=== Regular season and playoffs ===
			Regular season					Playoffs
Season	Team	League	GP	G	A	Pts	PIM	GP	G	A	Pts	PIM
1948–49	Stratford Kroehlers	OHA	37	6	5	11	33	3	0	1	1	2
1949–50	Stratford Kroehlers	OHA	46	10	12	22	50	—	—	—	—	—
1950–51	Stratford Kroehlers	OHA	52	13	16	29	87	3	2	1	3	9
1950–51	Boston Bruins	NHL	2	0	0	0	2	—	—	—	—	—
1951–52	Hershey Bears	AHL	67	6	15	21	61	5	0	0	0	4
1951–52	Boston Bruins	NHL	—	—	—	—	—	5	0	0	0	2
1952–53	Boston Bruins	NHL	55	0	8	8	45	11	1	1	2	10
1953–53	Boston Bruins	NHL	64	2	10	12	81	4	0	1	1	0
1954–55	Boston Bruins	NHL	57	1	3	4	38	5	0	0	0	2
1955–56	Boston Bruins	NHL	68	0	12	12	122	—	—	—	—	—
1956–57	Boston Bruins	NHL	57	1	15	16	79	10	0	3	3	10
1957–58	Boston Bruins	NHL	47	1	4	5	66	—	—	—	—	—
1957–58	Springfield Indians	AHL	26	5	11	16	37	13	5	8	13	31
1958–59	Boston Bruins	NHL	60	1	9	10	50	7	0	2	2	4
1959–60	Boston Bruins	NHL	69	5	14	19	96	—	—	—	—	—
1960–61	Boston Bruins	NHL	54	0	10	10	72	—	—	—	—	—
1961–62	Boston Bruins	NHL	9	2	1	3	20	—	—	—	—	—
1961–62	Boston Bruins	NHL	9	2	1	3	20	—	—	—	—	—
1961–62	Hull-Ottawa Canadiens	EPHL	61	6	28	34	116	13	1	3	4	10
1962–63	Rochester Americans	AHL	70	1	28	29	89	2	1	0	1	4
NHL totals			542	13	86	99	671	42	1	7	8	28

== Awards and achievements ==
- Played in NHL All-Star Game (1960)

== See also ==
- List of NHL players who spent their entire career with one franchise
