= Ivan Irwin =

American-born Canadian ice hockey player (1927–2019)

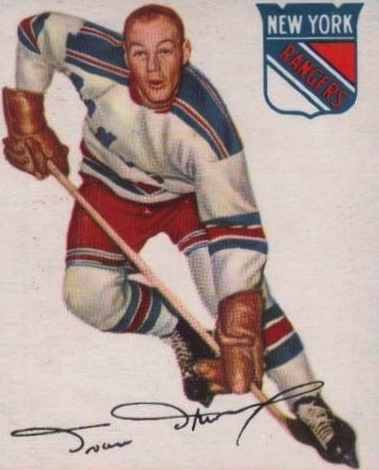
- Born: March 13, 1927 Chicago, Illinois, U.S.
- Died: February 11, 2019 (aged 91) Ajax, Ontario, Canada
- Height: 6 ft 1 in (185 cm)
- Weight: 180 lb (82 kg; 12 st 12 lb)
- Position: Defence
- Shot: Left
- Played for: New York Rangers; Montreal Canadiens
- Playing career: 1947–1960

Ivan Duane Irwin (March 13, 1927 – February 11, 2019) was an American-born Canadian professional ice hockey defenseman who played 155 games in the National Hockey League for the New York Rangers and Montreal Canadiens between 1952 and 1957. The rest of his career, which lasted from 1947 to 1960, was spent in the minor leagues. He was born in Chicago, Illinois and raised in Toronto, Ontario. Irwin died in 2019, aged 91.

== Career statistics ==
=== Regular season and playoffs ===
			Regular season					Playoffs
Season	Team	League	GP	G	A	Pts	PIM	GP	G	A	Pts	PIM
1943–44	Northern Vocational	HS-ON	6	1	2	3	8	—	—	—	—	—
1943–44	Scarborough Colts	OHA-B	—	—	—	—	—	—	—	—	—	—
1944–45	Scarborough Colts	OHA-B	—	—	—	—	—	—	—	—	—	—
1945–46	Toronto Dorsts	TMHL	1	0	0	0	0	—	—	—	—	—
1945–46	Toronto Tip Tops	TIHL	5	2	0	2	0	—	—	—	—	—
1945–46	Scarborough Colts	OHA-B	—	—	—	—	—	—	—	—	—	—
1947–48	Boston Olympics	QSHL	40	1	3	4	72	—	—	—	—	—
1947–48	Boston Olympics	EAHL	16	2	1	3	36	—	—	—	—	—
1948–49	Sherbrooke Red Raiders	QSHL	55	1	8	9	124	12	1	2	3	36
1949–50	Sherbrooke Saints	QSHL	7	1	0	1	30	—	—	—	—	—
1949–50	Cincinnati Mohawks	AHL	52	2	7	9	114	—	—	—	—	—
1950–51	Cincinnati Mohawks	AHL	62	3	14	17	145	—	—	—	—	—
1951–52	Cincinnati Mohawks	AHL	67	4	10	14	111	7	0	1	1	18
1952–53	Montreal Canadiens	NHL	4	0	1	1	0	—	—	—	—	—
1952–53	Vancouver Canucks	WHL	58	5	20	25	116	—	—	—	—	—
1953–54	New York Rangers	NHL	56	2	12	14	109	—	—	—	—	—
1953–54	Vancouver Canucks	WHL	13	1	0	1	20	—	—	—	—	—
1954–55	New York Rangers	NHL	34	0	1	1	20	—	—	—	—	—
1955–56	New York Rangers	NHL	60	0	1	1	20	5	0	0	0	8
1955–56	Providence Reds	AHL	19	0	5	5	43	—	—	—	—	—
1956–57	Providence Reds	AHL	62	4	14	18	149	5	0	1	1	8
1957–58	New York Rangers	NHL	1	0	0	0	0	—	—	—	—	—
1957–58	Providence Reds	AHL	63	2	16	18	146	5	1	2	3	6
1958–59	Buffalo Bisons	AHL	63	3	12	15	106	11	0	3	3	16
1959–60	Buffalo Bisons	AHL	40	1	8	9	53	—	—	—	—	—
AHL totals			428	19	86	105	867	28	1	7	8	48
NHL totals			155	2	27	29	214	5	0	0	0	8
