= Gord Hannigan =

Canadian ice hockey player

- Born: January 19, 1929; Schumacher, Ontario, Canada
- Died: November 16, 1966 (aged 37); Edmonton, Alberta, Canada
- Height: 5 ft 8 in (173 cm)
- Weight: 155 lb (70 kg; 11 st 1 lb)
- Position: Centre
- Shot: Left
- Played for: Toronto Maple Leafs
- Playing career: 1951–1958

John Gordon Hannigan (January 19, 1929 – November 16, 1966) was a Canadian professional ice hockey forward who played for the Toronto Maple Leafs in the National Hockey League between 1952 and 1956.

== Playing career ==
Hannigan was a left winger and centre for the Toronto Maple Leafs (1952–1956) of the National Hockey League (NHL), Pittsburgh Hornets (1951–1952, 1954–1956) and Rochester Americans (1956–1957) of the American Hockey League (AHL) and the Edmonton Flyers (1957–1958) of the Western Hockey League (WHL).

He played for the St. Michael's College School Monarchs as a 155-pound, fast-skating left winger, in 1951. He worked out with Toronto for the first time in February 1949, along with Tim Horton. Because of an Ontario Hockey Association rule, the two college players were not allowed to play for the Toronto Marlboros – a Maple Leafs affiliate – in that junior ice hockey league. Leafs' President Conn Smythe did not like the ruling but granted the junior players a trial after four of his team's forwards were injured. In October 1953 Hannigan sustained a rib injury in practice and was out of the Maple Leafs lineup for three weeks.

Hannigan played the 1956–57 season for the Rochester Americans of the American Hockey League. Jack Perrin, President of the WHL Winnipeg Warriors (1955–1961), made overtures to buy Hannigan's rights from the Maple Leafs in September 1957. Hannigan told Perrin that, if he could not play for the NHL Leafs, he would only consider an offer from the WHL Edmonton Flyers. He was purchased by the Flyers from the Leafs in October 1957, and his first game for the Flyers was against the Saskatoon/St. Paul Regals, when he replaced injured rookie John Utendale.

His older brother, Ray Hannigan, played in the NHL, AHL and WHL (1948–1955). His younger brother, Pat Hannigan, played in the WHL and NHL (1956–1962). The three brothers played with, or against, each other in some of those seasons.

== Personal life ==
Gord Hannigan was a partner, with his brothers, in a successful Edmonton ice cream business at the time of his acquisition by the Flyers. He also had other interests in the Alberta city.

Hannigan married Ann Mary Conboy of Pittsburgh, Pennsylvania in August 1953. Together they had nine children, before the then 37-year-old's sudden hospitalization and death in Edmonton on November 16, 1966.

== Career statistics ==
=== Regular season and playoffs ===
			Regular season					Playoffs
Season	Team	League	GP	G	A	Pts	PIM	GP	G	A	Pts	PIM
1946–47	Schumacher Lions	NOHA	—	—	—	—	—	—	—	—	—	—
1947–48	St. Michael's Majors	OHA	32	14	13	27	55	—	—	—	—	—
1948–49	St. Michael's Majors	OHA	32	21	13	34	59	—	—	—	—	—
1949–50	Toronto Marlboros	OHA Sr	25	6	12	18	19	14	2	4	6	14
1949–50	Toronto Marlboros	Al-Cup	—	—	—	—	—	12	2	7	9	35
1950–51	St. Michael's Monarchs	OMHL	30	19	20	39	56	9	4	6	10	6
1951–52	Pittsburgh Hornets	AHL	67	24	26	50	80	11	2	5	7	15
1952–53	Toronto Maple Leafs	NHL	65	17	18	35	49	—	—	—	—	—
1953–54	Toronto Maple Leafs	NHL	35	4	4	8	18	5	2	0	2	4
1954–55	Toronto Maple Leafs	NHL	13	0	2	2	8	—	—	—	—	—
1954–55	Pittsburgh Hornets	AHL	35	9	16	25	19	10	1	7	8	16
1955–56	Toronto Maple Leafs	NHL	48	8	7	15	40	4	0	0	0	4
1955–56	Pittsburgh Hornets	AHL	17	10	10	20	20	—	—	—	—	—
1956–57	Rochester Americans	AHL	64	21	40	61	111	10	2	4	6	37
1957–58	Edmonton Flyers	WHL	25	6	8	14	15	—	—	—	—	—
AHL totals			183	64	92	156	230	31	5	16	21	68
NHL totals			161	29	31	60	115	9	0	2	2	8

== See also ==
- List of family relations in the National Hockey League
