= 1953–54 NHL season =

National Hockey League season

- League: National Hockey League
- Sport: Ice hockey
- Duration: October 8, 1953 – April 16, 1954
- Games: 70
- Teams: 6
- TV partner(s): CBC, SRC (Canada); None (United States)

Regular season
- Season champion: Detroit Red Wings
- Season MVP: Al Rollins (Black Hawks)
- Top scorer: Gordie Howe (Red Wings)

Stanley Cup
- Champions: Detroit Red Wings
- Runners-up: Montreal Canadiens

NHL seasons
- ← 1952–53 1954–55 →

The 1953–54 NHL season was the 37th season of the National Hockey League. Six teams played 70 games each. The Detroit Red Wings defeated the Montreal Canadiens in the final to win the team's sixth championship.

== League business ==
National Hockey League (NHL) team owners gave notice to terminate the professional-amateur agreement with the Canadian Amateur Hockey Association (CAHA). The Canadian Press reported that the decision was to protect investments into amateur teams and to improve the financial return. The NHL proposed a new national junior ice hockey playoff format solely for teams sponsored by the NHL, instead of the existing Memorial Cup championship. CAHA president W. B. George predicted that the NHL would not last three years without the CAHA, and stated that it would end the current system which allowed a three-game tryout for an amateur with a professional team. In August 1953, the CAHA and NHL agreed in principle to a proposal that resumed east–west transfers of junior players, and increased the amount of profits to junior teams sponsored by the NHL. At the semi-annual meeting, the CAHA agreed to distribute playoffs funds proportional to the profit on a series-by-series basis, but rejected the request to resume transfers from west to east.

== Regular season ==
The New York Rangers decided to drop Gump Worsley and went with Johnny Bower in goal this season. Bower did well, but not well enough to get the Rangers into the playoffs. However, the Rangers managed to come up with a fine rookie in Camille Henry who won the Calder Memorial Trophy.

On December 9, the Montreal Canadiens played the Toronto Maple Leafs at Maple Leaf Gardens and the teams set a record of most penalties in a game. The trouble started when Montreal's Eddie Mazur got into a fight with Toronto's George Armstrong in the first period. Both received game misconduct penalties. Early in the second period, Bud MacPherson broke his stick on the ribs of Toronto's Ron Stewart. He chose not to retaliate until a more opportune time. It came at 18:12 of the third period when Stewart and MacPherson collided again. This time they pushed and shoved and the gloves came off and they began to pummel each other. Tom Johnson came to MacPherson's aid by putting a headlock on Stewart and Stewart threw a punch that landed on Johnson's jaw. Stewart pursued MacPherson again, now that he was in combat with Eric Nesterenko of Toronto and soon the benches emptied and everyone was fighting except Maurice Richard and Tim Horton who merely grabbed each other's sweaters. Referee Frank Udvari handed out 36 penalties, including 15 misconducts for a record 204 minutes in penalties. With almost 2 minutes left in the game, only 8 players from each team excluding the goaltenders Gerry McNeil and Harry Lumley, who did battle in the brawl, were permitted to finish the game. Almost forgotten was that Toronto won the game 3–0.

There were persistent rumours that the Chicago Black Hawks would fold due to the poor performance of the team and fans staying away in droves. NHL president Clarence Campbell discussed the problems with Arthur M. Wirtz and it was announced that the rumours were without foundation.

Campbell was busy this year imposing fines and suspensions. As a result of pushing referee Frank Udvari into the boards during a November 12 game, Bernie Geoffrion was fined $250. Later, in a December 20 game, he and Ron Murphy engaged in stick swinging which left Murphy with a broken jaw. Both players were suspended.

There was trouble brewing for Maurice Richard when he ghosted an article in the Samedi Dimanche newspaper, calling NHL president Clarence Campbell a dictator and took exception to Campbell's suspension of Bernie "Boom Boom" Geoffrion for the stick swinging incident. Richard was required to post a $1000 bond and refrain from any more articles.

This season saw both instances of Gordie Howe accomplishing what is now known as the Gordie Howe hat trick. The first was on October 11, 1953, when he scored a goal, assisted on Red Kelly's goal, and fought the Toronto Maple Leafs' Fernie Flaman. The second was on March 21, 1954, once again versus the Maple Leafs. Howe scored the opening goal, assisted on two Ted Lindsay goals, and fought Ted "Teeder" Kennedy.

The Detroit Red Wings were first overall in the National Hockey League for the sixth straight season.

=== Final standings ===
National Hockey League
		GP	W	L	T	GF	GA	DIFF	Pts
1	Detroit Red Wings	70	37	19	14	191	132	+59	88
2	Montreal Canadiens	70	35	24	11	195	141	+54	81
3	Toronto Maple Leafs	70	32	24	14	152	131	+21	78
4	Boston Bruins	70	32	28	10	177	181	−4	74
5	New York Rangers	70	29	31	10	161	182	−21	68
6	Chicago Black Hawks	70	12	51	7	133	242	−109	31

== Playoffs ==
After losing four straight games to the Montreal Canadiens, Boston Bruins general manager Art Ross, their manager from the day the Bruins came into the NHL, announced his retirement. He had been grooming Lynn Patrick to succeed him and Patrick took over as general manager.

=== Playoff bracket ===
The top four teams in the league qualified for the playoffs. In the semifinals, the first-place team played the third-place team, while the second-place team faced the fourth-place team, with the winners advancing to the Stanley Cup Finals. In both rounds, teams competed in a best-of-seven series (scores in the bracket indicate the number of games won in each best-of-seven series).

Semifinals
1	Detroit	4
3	Toronto	1
2	Montreal	4
4	Boston	0

Stanley Cup Finals
1	Detroit	4
2	Montreal	3

=== Semifinals ===
==== (1) Detroit Red Wings vs. (3) Toronto Maple Leafs ====
March 23	Toronto Maple Leafs	0–5	Detroit Red Wings	Olympia Stadium	Recap
No scoring		First period	08:21 – sh – Marty Pavelich (1); 15:48 – pp – Ted Lindsay (1)
No scoring		Second period	06:01 – Tony Leswick (1); 17:39 – Gordie Howe (1)
No scoring		Third period	14:01 – Marty Pavelich (2)
Harry Lumley 20 saves / 25 shots		Goalie stats	Terry Sawchuck 37 saves / 37 shots

March 25	Toronto Maple Leafs	3–1	Detroit Red Wings	Olympia Stadium	Recap
Sid Smith (1) – 09:16		First period	No scoring
Gord Hannigan (1) – 17:41		Second period	No scoring
Gord Hannigan (2) – pp – 02:16		Third period	04:52 – pp – Marcel Pronovost (1)
Harry Lumley 27 saves / 28 shots		Goalie stats	Terry Sawchuck 24 saves / 27 shots

March 27	Detroit Red Wings	3–1	Toronto Maple Leafs	Maple Leaf Gardens	Recap
Red Kelly (1) – 10:09		First period	19:11 – George Armstrong (1)
No scoring		Second period	No scoring
Tony Leswick (2) – 00:28; Marcel Pronovost (2) – en – 18:38		Third period	No scoring
Terry Sawchuck 28 saves / 29 shots		Goalie stats	Harry Lumley 25 saves / 27 shots

March 30	Detroit Red Wings	2–1	Toronto Maple Leafs	Maple Leaf Gardens	Recap
No scoring		First period	No scoring
Johnny Wilson (1) – 11:26		Second period	05:09 – Tim Horton (1)
Red Kelly (2) – 16:36		Third period	No scoring
Terry Sawchuck 26 saves / 27 shots		Goalie stats	Harry Lumley 27 saves / 29 shots

April 1	Toronto Maple Leafs	3–4	2OT	Detroit Red Wings	Olympia Stadium	Recap
Tod Sloan (1) – 16:16		First period		00:09 – Gordie Howe (2); 12:54 – Gordie Howe (3); 16:35 – Glen Skov (1)
Ted Kennedy (1) – 01:33; Rudy Migay (1) – 09:11		Second period		No scoring
No scoring		Third period		No scoring
No scoring		Second overtime period		01:01 – Ted Lindsay (2)
Harry Lumley 46 saves / 50 shots		Goalie stats		Terry Sawchuck 36 saves / 39 shots

Detroit won series 4–1

==== (2) Montreal Canadiens vs. (4) Boston Bruins ====
March 23	Boston Bruins	0–2	Montreal Canadiens	Montreal Forum	Recap
No scoring		First period	No scoring
No scoring		Second period	04:25 – Lorne Davis (1)
No scoring		Third period	13:48 – Bernie Geoffrion (1)
Jim Henry 41 saves / 43 shots		Goalie stats	Jacques Plante 13 saves / 13 shots

March 25	Boston Bruins	1–8	Montreal Canadiens	Montreal Forum	Recap
No scoring		First period	00:10 – Dickie Moore (1); 05:57 – Bernie Geoffrion (2); 06:28 – Bernie Geoffrion (3); 16:41 – Lorne Davis (2); 18:10 – Dickie Moore (2)
Fleming MacKell (1) – 13:02		Second period	01:19 – Jean Beliveau (1)
No scoring		Third period	05:03 – Paul Meger (1); 13:38 – pp – Jean Beliveau (2)
Jim Henry 22 saves / 30 shots		Goalie stats	Jacques Plante 28 saves / 29 shots

March 28	Montreal Canadiens	4–3	Boston Bruins	Boston Garden	Recap
No scoring		First period	No scoring
Butch Bouchard (1) – 00:16; Bernie Geoffrion (4) – 02:15; Butch Bouchard (2) – 06:53		Second period	00:40 – Cal Gardner (1)
Dickie Moore (3) – 18:30		Third period	10:18 – Doug Mohns (1); 16:09 – Milt Schmidt (1)
Jacques Plante 20 saves / 23 shots		Goalie stats	Jim Henry 29 saves / 33 shots

March 30	Montreal Canadiens	2–0	Boston Bruins	Boston Garden	Recap
Floyd Curry (1) – 11:36		First period	No scoring
Dickie Moore (4) – pp – 02:06		Second period	No scoring
No scoring		Third period	No scoring
Jacques Plante 24 saves / 24 shots		Goalie stats	Jim Henry 41 saves / 43 shots

Montreal won series 4–0

=== Stanley Cup Finals ===
April 4	Montreal Canadiens	1–3	Detroit Red Wings	Olympia Stadium	Recap
No scoring		First period	13:44 – pp – Ted Lindsay (3)
Bernie Geoffrion (5) – pp – 12:16		Second period	No scoring
No scoring		Third period	01:52 – pp – Dutch Reibel (1); 07:13 – sh – Red Kelly (3)
Jacques Plante 25 saves / 28 shots		Goalie stats	Terry Sawchuck 18 saves / 19 shots

April 6	Montreal Canadiens	3–1	Detroit Red Wings	Olympia Stadium	Recap
Dickie Moore (5) – pp – 15:03; Maurice Richard (1) – pp – 15:28; Maurice Richard (2) – pp – 15:59		First period	No scoring
No scoring		Second period	06:37 – pp – Alex Delvecchio (1)
No scoring		Third period	No scoring
Jacques Plante 25 saves / 26 shots		Goalie stats	Terry Sawchuck 25 saves / 28 shots

April 8	Detroit Red Wings	5–2	Montreal Canadiens	Montreal Forum	Recap
Alex Delvecchio (2) – 00:42; Ted Lindsay (4) – 17:06		First period	No scoring
Johnny Wilson (2) – 04:57		Second period	No scoring
Metro Prystai (1) – pp – 07:59; Gordie Howe (4) – 11:32		Third period	07:19 – sh – Tom Johnson (1); 15:02 – Dollard St. Laurent (1)
Terry Sawchuck 23 saves / 25 shots		Goalie stats	Jacques Plante 32 saves / 37 shots

April 10	Detroit Red Wings	2–0	Montreal Canadiens	Montreal Forum	Recap
No scoring		First period	No scoring
Johnny Wilson (3) – 02:09		Second period	No scoring
Red Kelly (4) – en – 19:53		Third period	No scoring
Terry Sawchuck 28 saves / 28 shots		Goalie stats	Jacques Plante 27 saves / 28 shots

April 11	Montreal Canadiens	1–0	OT	Detroit Red Wings	Olympia Stadium	Recap
No scoring		First period		No scoring
No scoring		Second period		No scoring
No scoring		Third period		No scoring
Ken Mosdell (1) – 05:45		First overtime period		No scoring
Gerry McNeil 22 saves / 22 shots		Goalie stats		Terry Sawchuck 21 saves / 22 shots

April 13	Detroit Red Wings	1–4	Montreal Canadiens	Montreal Forum	Recap
No scoring		First period	No scoring
No scoring		Second period	12:07 – Bernie Geoffrion (6); 13:07 – Floyd Curry (2); 14:25 – Floyd Curry (3)
Metro Prystai (2) – 05:11		Third period	10:06 – Maurice Richard (3)
Terry Sawchuck 26 saves / 30 shots		Goalie stats	Gerry McNeil 33 saves / 34 shots

April 16	Montreal Canadiens	1–2	OT	Detroit Red Wings	Olympia Stadium	Recap
Floyd Curry (4) – 09:17		First period		No scoring
No scoring		Second period		01:17 – pp – Red Kelly (5)
No scoring		Third period		No scoring
No scoring		First overtime period		04:29 – Tony Leswick (3)
Gerry McNeil 31 saves / 33 shots		Goalie stats		Terry Sawchuck 22 saves / 23 shots

Detroit won series 4–3

== Awards ==
The James Norris Memorial Trophy made its debut this season and its first winner was Red Kelly of the Detroit Red Wings. The Norris Trophy goes to the top defenceman each year and was named in honour of James E. Norris, owner of the Detroit Red Wings franchise from 1932 until his death in 1952.

Award winners
Prince of Wales Trophy: (Regular season champion)	Detroit Red Wings
Art Ross Trophy: (Top scorer)	Gordie Howe, Detroit Red Wings
Calder Memorial Trophy: (Best first-year player)	Camille Henry, New York Rangers
Hart Trophy: (Most valuable player)	Al Rollins, Chicago Black Hawks
James Norris Memorial Trophy: (Best defenceman)	Red Kelly, Detroit Red Wings
Lady Byng Memorial Trophy: (Excellence and sportsmanship)	Red Kelly, Detroit Red Wings
Vezina Trophy: (Goaltender of team with best goals-against record)	Harry Lumley, Toronto Maple Leafs

All-Star teams
First team	Position	Second team
Harry Lumley, Toronto Maple Leafs	G	Terry Sawchuk, Detroit Red Wings
Red Kelly, Detroit Red Wings	D	Bill Gadsby, Chicago Black Hawks
Doug Harvey, Montreal Canadiens	D	Tim Horton, Toronto Maple Leafs
Ken Mosdell, Montreal Canadiens	C	Ted Kennedy, Toronto Maple Leafs
Gordie Howe, Detroit Red Wings	RW	Maurice Richard, Montreal Canadiens
Ted Lindsay, Detroit Red Wings	LW	Ed Sandford, Boston Bruins

== Player statistics ==
=== Scoring leaders ===
Note: GP = Games played, G = Goals, A = Assists, Pts = Points, PIM = Penalties in minutes

Player	Team	GP	G	A	Pts	PIM
Gordie Howe	Detroit Red Wings	70	33	48	81	109
Maurice Richard	Montreal Canadiens	70	37	30	67	112
Ted Lindsay	Detroit Red Wings	70	26	36	62	110
Bernie Geoffrion	Montreal Canadiens	54	29	25	54	87
Bert Olmstead	Montreal Canadiens	70	15	37	52	85
Red Kelly	Detroit Red Wings	62	16	33	49	18
Earl Reibel	Detroit Red Wings	69	15	33	48	18
Ed Sandford	Boston Bruins	70	16	31	47	42
Fleming Mackell	Boston Bruins	67	15	32	47	60
Ken Mosdell	Montreal Canadiens	67	22	24	46	64

Source: NHL

=== Leading goaltenders ===
Note: GP = Games played; Min – Minutes played; GA = Goals against; GAA = Goals against average; W = Wins; L = Losses; T = Ties; SO = Shutouts

Player	Team	GP	MIN	GA	GAA	W	L	T	SO
Jacques Plante	Montreal Canadiens	17	1020	27	1.59	7	5	5	5
Harry Lumley	Toronto Maple Leafs	69	4140	128	1.86	32	24	13	13
Terry Sawchuk	Detroit Red Wings	67	4004	129	1.93	35	19	13	12
Gerry McNeil	Montreal Canadiens	53	3180	114	2.15	28	19	6	6
Jim Henry	Boston Bruins	70	4200	181	2.59	32	28	10	8
Johnny Bower	New York Rangers	70	4200	182	2.60	29	31	10	5
Al Rollins	Chicago Black Hawks	66	3960	213	3.23	12	47	7	5

== Coaches ==
- Boston Bruins: Lynn Patrick
- Chicago Black Hawks: Sid Abel
- Detroit Red Wings: Tommy Ivan
- Montreal Canadiens: Dick Irvin
- New York Rangers: Frank Boucher
- Toronto Maple Leafs: King Clancy

== Debuts ==
The following is a list of players of note who played their first NHL game in 1953–54 (listed with their first team, asterisk(*) marks debut in playoffs):

- Doug Mohns, Boston Bruins
- Earl Reibel, Detroit Red Wings
- Camille Henry, New York Rangers
- Johnny Bower, New York Rangers

== Last games ==
The following is a list of players of note who played their last game in the NHL in 1953–54 (listed with their last team):

- Woody Dumart, Boston Bruins
- George Gee, Chicago Black Hawks
- Jack Gelineau, Chicago Black Hawks
- Sid Abel, Chicago Black Hawks
- Jim McFadden, Chicago Black Hawks
- Elmer Lach, Montreal Canadiens
- Gaye Stewart, Montreal Canadiens
- Doug Bentley, New York Rangers
- Max Bentley, New York Rangers
- Leo Reise, New York Rangers
- Howie Meeker, Toronto Maple Leafs

== Broadcasting ==
This was the second season of Hockey Night in Canada on CBC Television. Coverage this season began to include selected Stanley Cup playoff games. Both regular season and playoff games were not broadcast in their entirety until the 1968–69 season, and were typically joined in progress, while the radio version of HNIC aired games in their entirety.

== See also ==
- 1953–54 NHL transactions
- List of Stanley Cup champions
- 7th National Hockey League All-Star Game
- National Hockey League All-Star Game
- 1953 in sports
- 1954 in sports
