= 7th National Hockey League All-Star Game =

Professional ice hockey exhibition game

7th NHL All-Star Game
	1	2	3	Total
All-Star team	2	0	1	3
Montreal Canadiens	0	0	1	1
- Date: October 3, 1953
- Arena: Montreal Forum
- City: Montreal
- Attendance: 14,153

The 7th National Hockey League All-Star Game took place at the Montreal Forum, home of the Montreal Canadiens, on October 3, 1953. The Canadiens, winner of the 1953 Stanley Cup Finals, played a team of All-Stars, with the All-Stars winning the game, 3–1.

== Game summary ==
	NHL All-Stars	Montreal Canadiens
Final score	3	1
Scoring summary	Hergesheimer (Ronty, Kelly), 4:06 1st (PPG); Hergesheimer (Kelly), 5:25 1st (PPG); Delvecchio (unassisted), 19:27 3rd (ENG)	Richard (Harvey, Beliveau), 4:30 3rd (PPG)
Penalties	Lindsay, 8:55 1st; Mortson, 5:03 2nd; Howe, 12:52 2nd; Kelly (fighting major), 2:34 3rd; Smith, 3:30 3rd	Meger, 4:00 1st; MacPherson, 4:37 1st; St. Laurent, 11:28 2nd; Richard, 15:18 2nd; Mosdell, 19:58 2nd; Olmstead (fighting major), 2:34 3rd
Win/loss	W - Terry Sawchuk	L - Gerry McNeil

- Referee: Red Storey
- Linesmen: Sammy Babcock, Doug Davies

== Rosters ==
	NHL All-Stars	Montreal Canadiens
Head coach	Lynn Patrick (Boston Bruins)	Dick Irvin (Montreal Canadiens)
Lineup	Starting lineup: 1 - G Terry Sawchuk (Detroit Red Wings); 2 - D Jim Thomson (Toronto Maple Leafs); 3 - D Bill Quackenbush (Boston Bruins); 4 - D Red Kelly (Detroit Red Wings); 6 - LW Ed Sandford (Boston Bruins); 7 - LW Ted Lindsay (Detroit Red Wings); 8 - LW Sid Smith (Toronto Maple Leafs); 9 - RW Gordie Howe (Detroit Red Wings); 10 - C Metro Prystai (Detroit Red Wings); 11 - RW Wally Hergesheimer (New York Rangers); 12 - RW Bill Mosienko (Chicago Black Hawks); 14 - D Bill Gadsby (Chicago Black Hawks); 15 - C Alex Delvecchio (Detroit Red Wings); 16 - D Gus Mortson (Chicago Black Hawks); 17 - D Leo Reise Jr. (New York Rangers); 18 - C Paul Ronty (New York Rangers); 24 - LW Harry Watson (Toronto Maple Leafs)	Starting lineup: 1 - G Gerry McNeil; 2 - D Doug Harvey; 3 - D Butch Bouchard, C; 4 - C Jean Beliveau; 5 - RW Bernie Geoffrion; 6 - RW Floyd Curry; 8 - LW Dick Gamble; 9 - RW Maurice Richard; 10 - D Tom Johnson; 12 - RW Dickie Moore; 14 - LW Calum MacKay; 15 - LW Bert Olmstead; 16 - C Elmer Lach; 17 - C John McCormack; 18 - C Ken Mosdell; 19 - D Dollard St. Laurent; 20 - LW Paul Meger; 21 - D Bud MacPherson; 22 - RW Lorne Davis; 24 - LW Eddie Mazur

== Notes ==
- ^1Named to the first All-Star team in 1952–53.
- ^2Named to the second All-Star team in 1952–53.
