= 1954 Stanley Cup Final =

1954 ice hockey championship series

	1	2	3	4	5	6	7	Total
Detroit Red Wings	3	1	5	2	0*	1	2*	4
Montreal Canadiens	1	3	2	0	1*	4	1*	3
- * – Denotes overtime period(s)
- Location(s): Detroit: Olympia Stadium (1, 2, 5, 7); Montreal: Montreal Forum (3, 4, 6)
- Coaches: Detroit: Tommy Ivan; Montreal: Dick Irvin
- Captains: Detroit: Ted Lindsay; Montreal: Emile Bouchard
- Dates: April 4–16, 1954
- Series-winning goal: Tony Leswick (4:29, OT)
- Hall of Famers: Red Wings: Keith Allen (1992, builder); Al Arbour (1996, builder; did not play); Alex Delvecchio (1977); Gordie Howe (1972); Red Kelly (1969); Ted Lindsay (1966); Marcel Pronovost (1978); Terry Sawchuk (1971); Canadiens: Jean Beliveau (1972); Emile Bouchard (1966); Bernie Geoffrion (1972); Doug Harvey (1973); Tom Johnson (1970); Elmer Lach (1966); Dickie Moore (1974); Bert Olmstead (1985); Jacques Plante (1978); Maurice Richard (1961); Coaches: Dick Irvin (1958, player); Tommy Ivan (1974); Officials: Bill Chadwick (1964); George Hayes (1988); Red Storey (1967)

The 1954 Stanley Cup Final was contested by the Detroit Red Wings and the defending champion Montreal Canadiens, in their fourth straight Finals. It was the second Detroit–Montreal Finals series of the 1950s. Despite blowing a 3–1 series lead, the Red Wings defeated the Canadiens in seven games to win their second Stanley Cup in four years and sixth overall.

As of today, this remains the last Stanley Cup Final where Game 7 was decided in overtime.

== Paths to the Finals ==
Montreal defeated the Boston Bruins 4–0 to reach the Finals. Detroit defeated the Toronto Maple Leafs 4–1 to reach the Finals.

== Game summaries ==
Tony Leswick scored the series-winning goal at 4:29 of overtime in Game 7. In fact, Leswick's goal was one of the strangest Stanley Cup-winning goals in history, as Leswick's shot was deflected off the glove of Montreal's Doug Harvey and into the net. The Canadiens immediately skated off the ice without shaking hands with the Red Wings. This was the second time in NHL history that Game 7 of the Stanley Cup Final was decided in overtime; the previous time it happened, in 1950, Detroit beat the New York Rangers in the Finals. As of 2025, this is the last Stanley Cup Final to have an overtime Game 7.

=== Game one ===
April 4	Montreal Canadiens	1–3	Detroit Red Wings	Olympia Stadium	Recap

Scoring summary
Period	Team	Goal	Assist(s)	Time	Score
1st	DET	Ted Lindsay (3) – pp	Earl Reibel (3) and Alex Delvecchio (4)	13:44	1–0 DET
2nd	MTL	Bernie Geoffrion (5) – pp	Doug Harvey (3) and Paul Masnick (2)	12:16	1–1
3rd	DET	Earl Reibel (1) – pp	Ted Lindsay (3) and Gordie Howe (4)	01:52	2–1 DET
3rd	DET	Red Kelly (3) – sh	Marty Pavelich (3) and Tony Leswick (1)	07:13	3–1 DET
Penalty summary
Period	Team	Player	Penalty	Time	PIM
1st	MTL	Dollard St. Laurent	Interference	00:52	2:00
1st	MTL	Bert Olmstead	Tripping	05:53	2:00
1st	DET	Glen Skov	Tripping	08:24	2:00
1st	MTL	Dickie Moore	Hooking	11:54	2:00
1st	DET	Marcel Pronovost	Tripping	14:52	2:00
1st	DET	Ted Lindsay	High-sticking	17:39	2:00
1st	DET	Ted Lindsay	Misconduct	17:39	10:00
1st	MTL	Maurice Richard	Cross-checking	19:04	2:00
2nd	MTL	Maurice Richard	High-sticking	01:49	2:00
2nd	MTL	Maurice Richard	Misconduct	01:49	10:00
2nd	DET	Marty Pavelich	High-sticking	05:38	2:00
2nd	MTL	Tom Johnson	Holding	07:28	2:00
2nd	DET	Glen Skov	Tripping	12:04	2:00
3rd	MTL	Dollard St. Laurent	Boarding	00:59	2:00
3rd	DET	Marcel Pronovost	Tripping	05:46	2:00

=== Game two ===
April 6	Montreal Canadiens	3–1	Detroit Red Wings	Olympia Stadium	Recap

Scoring summary
Period	Team	Goal	Assist(s)	Time	Score
1st	MTL	Dickie Moore (5) – pp	Bernie Geoffrion (5) and Jean Beliveau (7)	15:03	1–0 MTL
1st	MTL	Maurice Richard (1) – pp	Dickie Moore (7)	15:28	2–0 MTL
1st	MTL	Maurice Richard (2) – pp	Dickie Moore (8)	15:59	3–0 MTL
2nd	DET	Alex Delvecchio (1) – pp	Unassisted	06:37	3–1 MTL
3rd	None				
Penalty summary
Period	Team	Player	Penalty	Time	PIM
1st	DET	Tony Leswick	High-sticking	01:11	2:00
1st	MTL	Emile Bouchard	High-sticking	01:11	2:00
1st	MTL	Bernie Geoffrion	Tripping	06:19	2:00
1st	DET	Gordie Howe	Holding	11:12	2:00
1st	MTL	Doug Harvey	Hooking	11:24	2:00
1st	DET	Gordie Howe	High-sticking	13:42	2:00
1st	DET	Tony Leswick	Slashing	14:01	10:00
1st	MTL	Ken Mosdell	Tripping	16:36	2:00
2nd	MTL	Bud MacPherson	Interference	06:12	2:00
2nd	MTL	Emile Bouchard	Hooking	13:31	2:00
3rd	None				

=== Game three ===
April 8	Detroit Red Wings	5–2	Montreal Canadiens	Montreal Forum	Recap

Scoring summary
Period	Team	Goal	Assist(s)	Time	Score
1st	DET	Alex Delvecchio (2)	Gordie Howe (5)	00:42	1–0 DET
1st	DET	Ted Lindsay (4)	Red Kelly (1)	17:06	2–0 DET
2nd	DET	Johnny Wilson (2)	Metro Prystai (2) and Bob Goldham (2)	04:57	3–0 DET
3rd	MTL	Tom Johnson (1) – sh	Unassisted	07:19	3–1 DET
3rd	DET	Metro Prystai (1) – pp	Alex Delvecchio (5)	07:59	4–1 DET
3rd	DET	Gordie Howe (4)	Alex Delvecchio (6) and Benny Woit (1)	11:32	5–1 DET
3rd	MTL	Dollard St. Laurent (1)	Calum MacKay (1)	15:02	5–2 DET
Penalty summary
Period	Team	Player	Penalty	Time	PIM
1st	MTL	Paul Meger	Cross-checking	03:30	2:00
1st	DET	Benny Woit	Interference	06:30	2:00
1st	MTL	Maurice Richard	High-sticking	07:41	2:00
1st	DET	Ted Lindsay	Holding	09:40	2:00
1st	MTL	Bud MacPherson	Hooking	11:57	2:00
2nd	None				
3rd	MTL	Bert Olmstead	Hooking	00:22	2:00
3rd	DET	Terry Sawchuk	Slashing	02:45	2:00
3rd	MTL	Tom Johnson	Interference	02:45	2:00
3rd	MTL	Bernie Geoffrion	Slashing	06:49	2:00
3rd	MTL	Dickie Moore	Elbowing	17:32	2:00
3rd	DET	Gordie Howe	High-sticking	18:28	2:00
3rd	DET	Gordie Howe	Misconduct	18:28	10:00

=== Game four ===
April 10	Detroit Red Wings	2–0	Montreal Canadiens	Montreal Forum	Recap

Scoring summary
Period	Team	Goal	Assist(s)	Time	Score
1st	None				
2nd	DET	Johnny Wilson (3)	Metro Prystai (3)	02:09	1–0 DET
3rd	DET	Red Kelly (4) – en	Unassited	19:53	2–0 DET
Penalty summary
Period	Team	Player	Penalty	Time	PIM
1st	MTL	Lorne Davis	Boarding	01:03	2:00
1st	MTL	Bert Olmstead	Hooking	07:55	2:00
1st	DET	Marcel Pronovost	Holding	11:48	2:00
1st	MTL	Floyd Curry	Interference	15:57	2:00
2nd	DET	Benny Woit	Tripping	01:37	2:00
2nd	MTL	Maurice Richard	Interference	02:05	2:00
2nd	DET	Gordie Howe	Slashing – major	04:12	5:00
2nd	DET	Tony Leswick	Tripping	15:24	2:00
2nd	MTL	Maurice Richard	Charging	17:38	2:00
3rd	MTL	Bernie Geoffrion	Slashing	10:47	2:00
3rd	MTL	Bernie Geoffrion	Misconduct	10:47	10:00

=== Game five ===
April 11	Montreal Canadiens	1–0	OT	Detroit Red Wings	Olympia Stadium	Recap

Scoring summary
Period	Team	Goal	Assist(s)	Time	Score
1st	None				
2nd	None				
3rd	None				
OT	MTL	Ken Mosdell (1)	Unassited	05:45	1–0 MTL
Penalty summary
Period	Team	Player	Penalty	Time	PIM
1st	MTL	Bert Olmstead	Tripping	11:56	2:00
1st	DET	Tony Leswick	Roughing	16:27	2:00
1st	DET	Marty Pavelich	Roughing	16:27	2:00
1st	MTL	Jean Beliveau	Roughing	16:27	2:00
1st	MTL	Tom Johnson	Roughing	16:27	2:00
2nd	None				
3rd	MTL	Tom Johnson	Slashing	08:21	2:00
3rd	DET	Gordie Howe	Holding	10:33	2:00
3rd	MTL	Lorne Davis	Hooking	13:10	2:00
OT	None				

=== Game six ===
April 13	Detroit Red Wings	1–4	Montreal Canadiens	Montreal Forum	Recap

Scoring summary
Period	Team	Goal	Assist(s)	Time	Score
1st	None				
2nd	MTL	Bernie Geoffrion (6)	Jean Beliveau (8)	12:07	1–0 MTL
2nd	MTL	Floyd Curry (2)	Bert Olmstead (1) and Paul Masnick (3)	13:07	2–0 MTL
2nd	MTL	Floyd Curry (3)	Eddie Mazur (3) and Elmer Lach (1)	14:25	3–0 MTL
3rd	DET	Metro Prystai (2)	Unassisted	05:11	3–1 MTL
3rd	MTL	Maurice Richard (3)	Elmer Lach (2)	10:06	4–1 MTL
Penalty summary
Period	Team	Player	Penalty	Time	PIM
1st	MTL	Paul Masnick	Interference	02:46	2:00
1st	MTL	Lorne Davis	Slashing	10:41	2:00
2nd	MTL	Dollard St. Laurent	Interference	04:22	2:00
2nd	DET	Marcel Pronovost	Roughing	08:45	2:00
2nd	MTL	Dickie Moore	Roughing	08:45	2:00
2nd	DET	Glen Skov	Hooking	15:32	2:00
2nd	DET	Glen Skov	Slashing	19:50	2:00
3rd	MTL	Dickie Moore	Tripping	16:49	2:00

=== Game seven ===
April 11	Montreal Canadiens	1–2	OT	Detroit Red Wings	Olympia Stadium	Recap

Scoring summary
Period	Team	Goal	Assist(s)	Time	Score
1st	MTL	Floyd Curry (4)	Paul Masnick (4)	09:17	1–0 MTL
2nd	DET	Red Kelly (5) – pp	Ted Lindsay (4) and Alex Delvecchio (7)	01:17	1–1
3rd	None				
OT	DET	Tony Leswick (3)	Glen Skov (2)	04:29	2–1 DET
Penalty summary
Period	Team	Player	Penalty	Time	PIM
1st	MTL	Doug Harvey	Holding	14:20	2:00
1st	DET	Glen Skov	Hooking	17:11	2:00
2nd	MTL	Paul Masnick	Hooking	00:20	2:00
3rd	None				
OT	None				

== Broadcasting ==
CBC's coverage of games 3–5 were joined in progress at 9:30 p.m. (approximately one hour after start time). Meanwhile, CBC joined game six in at 10 p.m. (again, one hour after start time). Game seven was carried nationwide from the opening face-off at 9 p.m. Since game seven was played on Good Friday night, there were no commercials (Imperial Oil was the sponsor).

== Stanley Cup engraving ==
The 1954 Stanley Cup was presented to Red Wings captain Ted Lindsay by NHL President Clarence Campbell following the Red Wings 2–1 overtime win over the Canadiens in game seven.

The following Red Wings players and staff had their names engraved on the Stanley Cup 1953–54 Detroit Red Wings

=== Players ===
Centres

- 10 Metro Prystai
- 12 Glen Skov
- 14 Earl Reibel
- 10 Alex Delvecchio
- 19 Vic Stasiuk^

Wingers

- 7 Ted Lindsay (Captain)
- 8 Tony Leswick
- 9 Gordie Howe
- 11 Marty Pavelich
- 16 John Wilson
- 17 Bill Dineen
- 20 Jimmy Peters
- 26-25 Gilles Dube
- 21 Earl Johnson^

Defencemen

- 2 Bob Goldham (A)
- 3 Marcel Pronovost
- 4 Leonard Red Kelly (A)
- 5 Benny Woit
- 18 Al Arbour
- 19 Keith Allen

Goaltenders

- 1 Terry Sawchuk
- 1 David Gatherum*
- 1 Ross Wilson (Playing-Asst. Trainer)*

=== Coaching and administrative staff ===
- Marguerite Norris (President/Owner), Bruce Norris (Vice President/Owner)
- Jack Adams (Manager), Jimmy Skinner (Coach)
- John Mitchell (Chief Scout), Carl Mattson (Trainer)
- Fred Huber Jr. (Publicity Director), Wally Crossman (Asst. Trainer/Stick Boy)

=== Stanley Cup engraving ===
- #21 Earl Johnson's^ name was engraved on the Stanley Cup, even though he only played 1 regular-season game. Johnson spent the rest of his hockey career in the minors.
- Oct 10 1953, Terry Sawchuk was injured during a game. Ass't Trainer Ross Wilson played goal for the last 16 minutes. Dave Gatherum was called up from the minors. He played goal on Oct 11, 16, 17 for injured Terry Sawchuk. He recorded 1 win, 1 tie, and 1 loss. Gatherum went on to set an NHL record for the longest shutout sequence by a goaltender to start a career, 100:21 min, Oct 11-16, 1953. The record stood until 2011. Gatherum was recalled for the playoffs as a spare goalie. Gatherum never played in the NHL again after losing his first NHL game. Detroit still honoured Dave Gatherum's by having his name included on the Stanley Cup in 1954.
- Earl "Ching" Johnson and Ross "Left" Wilson's names were not included with 1954 Detroit when the cup was redone in 1958 and 1993, replica ring.
- #19 Vic Stasiuk^ played 43 games, but was sent to the minors. His name was left off the cup because he played in the minors during the playoffs.
- #21 Jim Hay played 12 games for Detroit, but did not play in the playoffs. He was included on the team picture. Gilles Dube was listed as Ed Dube by mistake on the team picture.
- Marguerite Norris was the first woman to be engraved on the Stanley Cup in 1954.
- Tommy Ivan was misspelled as THOMAS NIVAN COACH instead of Thomas N. Ivan when the cup was redone in 1957–58. His name was spelled THOMAS IVAN COACH on the Replica Cup created in 1992–93.

== See also ==
- 1953–54 NHL season

== Notes ==
Preceded by Montreal Canadiens; 1953	Detroit Red Wings; Stanley Cup champions 1954	Succeeded by Detroit Red Wings; 1955
