= Scott Moncrieff =

Scott Moncrieff may refer to:

- Colin Scott-Moncrieff (1836–1916), Scottish engineer, soldier and civil servant
- C. K. Scott Moncrieff (1889–1930), Scottish writer and translator
- George Scott-Moncrieff (1910–1974), Scottish writer and journalist
- George Kenneth Scott-Moncrieff (1855–1924), Scottish soldier and engineer
- Lucy Scott-Moncrieff (born 1954), British solicitor
- Robert Scott Moncrieff (1793–1869), Scottish advocate and artist
- Rose Scott-Moncrieff (1903–1991), British biochemist

== See also ==
- The dictionary definition of ScoMo at Wiktionary
- Scomo (disambiguation)
- Scott (disambiguation)
- Moncrieff (disambiguation)
