= 1953 Stanley Cup Final =

1953 ice hockey championship series

	1	2	3	4	5	Total
Montreal Canadiens	4	1	3	7	1*	4
Boston Bruins	2	4	0	3	0*	1
- * – Denotes overtime period(s)
- Location(s): Montreal: Montreal Forum (1, 2, 5); Boston: Boston Garden (3, 4)
- Coaches: Montreal: Dick Irvin; Boston: Lynn Patrick
- Captains: Montreal: Emile Bouchard; Boston: Milt Schmidt
- Dates: April 9–16, 1953
- Series-winning goal: Elmer Lach (1:22, OT)
- Hall of Famers: Canadiens: Emile Bouchard (1966); Bernie Geoffrion (1972); Doug Harvey (1973); Tom Johnson (1970); Elmer Lach (1966); Dickie Moore (1974); Bert Olmstead (1985); Jacques Plante (1978); Maurice Richard (1961); Bruins: Woody Dumart (1992); Bill Quackenbush (1976); Milt Schmidt (1961); Coaches: Dick Irvin (1958, player); Lynn Patrick (1980, player)

The 1953 Stanley Cup Final was contested by the Boston Bruins and the Montreal Canadiens. The Bruins were appearing in the Final for the first time since 1946. The Canadiens, who were appearing in their third straight Finals series, won the series four games to one to clinch their seventh championship.

== Paths to the Finals ==
Montreal defeated the Chicago Black Hawks 4–3 to reach the Finals. Boston defeated the defending champion Detroit Red Wings 4–2 to reach the Finals.

== The series ==
Jacques Plante was pulled after the first two games in favour of Gerry McNeil. The move paid off as McNeil posted two shutouts in the last three games.

April 9	Boston Bruins	2–4	Montreal Canadiens	Montreal Forum	Recap
Bob Armstrong (1) - pp - 2:08		First period	13:42 - Dickie Moore (2)
No scoring		Second period	2:37 - Ken Mosdell (2); 16:05 - Floyd Curry (2)
Johnny Peirson (3) - pp - 10:11		Third period	11:12 - Maurice Richard (4)
Jim Henry		Goalie stats	Jacques Plante

April 11	Boston Bruins	4–1	Montreal Canadiens	Montreal Forum	Recap
Leo Labine (2) - 3:53; Ed Sandford (7) - 18:13		First period	No scoring
Ed Sandford (8) - 7:26		Second period	1:36 - Bert Olmstead (2)
Milt Schmidt (4) - 15:43		Third period	No scoring
Jim Henry, Gord Henry		Goalie stats	Gerry McNeil

April 12	Montreal Canadiens	3–0	Boston Bruins	Boston Garden	Recap
Tom Johnson (2) - 11:53		First period	No scoring
Paul Masnick (1) - 6:30		Second period	No scoring
Ken Mosdell (3) - pp - 11:27		Third period	No scoring
Gerry McNeil		Goalie stats	Gord Henry

April 14	Montreal Canadiens	7–3	Boston Bruins	Boston Garden	Recap
Lorne Davis (1) - 3:23; Maurice Richard (5) - 10:58; Dickie Moore (3) - 16:40		First period	18:22 - Dave Creighton (4)
Bernie Geoffrion (6) - pp - 18:56		Second period	No scoring
Maurice Richard (6) - 5:33; Calum MacKay (1) - en - 17:59; Maurice Richard (7) - 18:27		Third period	7:23 - Milt Schmidt (5); 16:25 - Jack McIntyre (4)
Gerry McNeil		Goalie stats	Gord Henry

April 16	Boston Bruins	0–1	OT	Montreal Canadiens	Montreal Forum	Recap
No scoring		First period		No scoring
No scoring		Second period		No scoring
No scoring		Third period		No scoring
No scoring		First overtime period		1:22 - Elmer Lach (1)
Jim Henry		Goalie stats		Gerry McNeil

Montreal won series 4–1

== Stanley Cup engraving ==
The 1953 Stanley Cup was presented to Canadiens captain Emile Bouchard by NHL President Clarence Campbell following the Canadiens 1–0 overtime win over the Bruins in game five.

The following Canadiens players and staff had their names engraved on the Stanley Cup

1952–53 Montreal Canadiens

=== Players ===
Centres

- 11 Paul Masnick
- 14 Billy Reay (A)
- 16 Elmer Lach (A)
- 17 Johnny McCormack
- 18 Kenny Mosdell
- 20 Paul Meger (also played Wing)
- 23 Doug Anderson^

Wingers

- 4 Calum MacKay
- 5 Bernie Geoffrion
- 6 Floyd Curry
- 8 Dick Gamble
- 9 Maurice "Rocket" Richard
- 12 Dickie Moore
- 15 Bert Olmstead
- 22 Lorne Davis

Defencemen

- 2 Doug Harvey
- 3 Emile "Butch" Bouchard (Captain)
- 10 Tom Johnson
- 19 Dollard St. Laurent
- 21 Jim Bud MacPherson
- 23 Eddie Mazur

Goaltenders

- 1 Gerry McNeil
- 1 Jacques Plante

=== Coaching and administrative staff ===
- Donat Raymond (President/Owner), Dalton Coleman (Vice President/Owner)
- William Northey (Vice Presidents/Owners), Frank Selke Sr. (Manager)
- Dick Irvin Sr. (Coach), Hector Dubois (Trainer), Gaston Bettez (Asst. Trainer)
- Camile DesRoches^, Frank Selke Jr.^ (Publicity Directors)
- Doug Anderson played 2 games in the Semi-Finals, qualified to be on the Stanley Cup, but his name was still left off the cup and the team picture.
- ^- On the team picture, but missing from the Stanley Cup.

=== Stanley Cup engraving ===
- Eddie Maruz was misspelled EDDIE MARUZE, with an extra "E" on the Replica Cup created in 1992–93. His name was spelled correctly on the other two rings.
- Mistake: Gaston Bettez's name was misspelled in 1953. Gettez was GOSTON BETTES on the original ring in 1953, G Bettes on the other two rings of 1953 Montreal.

== See also ==
- List of Stanley Cup champions

== Notes ==
Preceded by Detroit Red Wings; 1952	Montreal Canadiens; Stanley Cup champions 1953	Succeeded by Detroit Red Wings; 1954
