= Scomo (disambiguation) =

Scomo is a nickname given to Scott Morrison (born 1968), Prime Minister of Australia from 2018 to 2022.

Scomo, SCOMO or ScoMo may also refer to:

- Software Component Management Object, used for accessing and managing software components
- Scott Morrison (basketball player) (born 1986), Canadian basketball player, nicknamed Scomo
- George Scott-Moncrieff (1910–1974), Scottish writer, nicknamed Scomo
- Lucy Scott-Moncrieff (born 1954), British judge and solicitor, nicknamed ScoMo
- The Supreme Court of Missouri, the highest court in the U.S. state of Missouri

== See also ==
- Scott Morrison (disambiguation)
- Scott Moncrieff (disambiguation)
