= Frank J. Selke =

Canadian ice hockey executive (1893–1985)

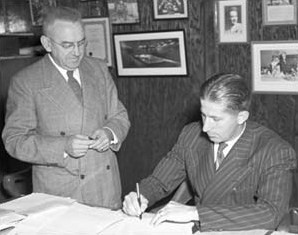
- Selke watching Elmer Lach sign his first contract, 1942
- Born: Francis Joseph Aloysius Selke; May 7, 1893; Berlin, Ontario, Canada
- Died: July 3, 1985 (aged 92); Rigaud, Quebec, Canada
- Occupation: NHL general manager

Francis Joseph Aloysius Selke (/ˈsɛlki/; May 7, 1893 – July 3, 1985) was a Canadian professional ice hockey executive in the National Hockey League. He was a nine-time Stanley Cup champion with the Toronto Maple Leafs and Montreal Canadiens and a Hockey Hall of Fame inductee.

== Executive career ==
=== Early career ===
Born in Berlin, Ontario, Selke was managing the Iroquois Bantams in his hometown at the age of 14. He coached the Berlin Union Jacks junior team in the Ontario Hockey Association from 1912 to 1915, reaching the finals of the league championship in his final season. In 1919, he coached the University of Toronto Schools hockey team to the first Memorial Cup title.

He coached the St. Mary's junior OHA team to its third-straight SPA junior championship in the 1924–25 season, with a team that included future Toronto Maple Leafs star Joe Primeau. In 1926–27, the team became the Toronto Marlboros, and again won the junior SPA championship. Eventual Hall of Famer Red Horner was a star defenceman on the Toronto team. During his time with the organization, Selke also coached the Marlboros senior team.

In 1927–28, Selke became coach and manager of the Toronto Ravinas of the Canadian Professional Hockey League, with Primeau as the team's leading scorer. The team was bought by the Toronto Maple Leafs and renamed the Toronto Falcons mid-season. Late in the year, the team played some home games in Brantford, Ontario, after drawing poor crowds in Toronto.

Rejoining the Marlboros in 1928–29, Selke helped lead the team to the 1929 Memorial Cup championship.

=== Toronto Maple Leafs ===
Selke became the top assistant to Maple Leafs managing director Conn Smythe in September 1929 — a position he would hold until 1946. He helped raise funds for the construction of Maple Leaf Gardens in 1931. While Smythe served in World War II, Selke filled in as acting manager of the Leafs and Maple Leaf Gardens. He did such a good job in that role that some of the directors of the company wanted him to remain in charge after Smythe returned.

Selke and Smythe clashed when Selke traded Frank Eddolls to the Montreal Canadiens for the rights to Ted Kennedy in 1943. Though Kennedy would go on to become one of Smythe's favourite Leafs, Smythe strongly supported Eddolls at the time and was upset that Selke had not consulted with him before making the deal. Once Smythe returned to Toronto, there was tension between the two, particularly after Selke refused to back Smythe's bid to become president of Maple Leaf Gardens Ltd. With his working conditions becoming intolerable, Selke submitted his resignation in May 1946.

=== Montreal Canadiens ===
Two months after resigning from the Leafs, Selke was hired as manager of the Montreal Forum and became general manager of the Montreal Canadiens. He took over a team that had just come off two Stanley Cup championships in the previous three seasons but was in financial trouble. Regardless, he signed a great deal of players and created an extensive farm system. Anchored by Hall of Famers Maurice Richard, Elmer Lach, Doug Harvey and Jacques Plante, Selke won his first Stanley Cup with the Canadiens in 1953.

In December 1946, Selke proposed that the NHL sponsor junior ice hockey teams under the Canadian Amateur Hockey Association jurisdiction. The plan implemented a farm system composed of professional prospects spread out across Canada, as opposed to the strongest players being concentrated on all-star teams in Ontario.

=== Last years ===
By the mid-1950s, the farm system that Selke had established began to put life into the Canadiens, producing additional Hall of Famers Jean Béliveau, Dickie Moore, Tom Johnson and Henri Richard. After falling to the rival Detroit Red Wings in seven games in consecutive years, 1954 and 1955, the Canadiens won a record five consecutive Cups from 1956 to 1960. Selke retired after the 1963–64 season, turning the reins over to Sam Pollock.

He died in 1985 at the age of 92 in Rigaud, Quebec.

== Honours ==
A nine-time Stanley Cup champion (1932, 1942, 1945 with the Maple Leafs; 1953, 1956–60 with the Canadiens), Selke was elected to the Hockey Hall of Fame in 1960. After his retirement in 1978, the NHL inaugurated the Frank J. Selke Trophy that is awarded annually to the best defensive forward in the league.

In the Quebec Major Junior Hockey League, the Frank J. Selke Memorial Trophy was awarded annually to the league's most gentlemanly player from 1969 to 2024, until it was renamed the David Desharnais Trophy.

In 2016, Frank J. Selke and his son, Frank Selke Jr., were posthumously recognized by the Ontario Sports Hall of Fame with the Bruce Prentice Legacy Award.

== See also ==
- List of family relations in the NHL

Preceded by Tommy Gorman	General Manager of the Montreal Canadiens; 1946–64	Succeeded by Sam Pollock
