= Scott Morris =

Scott Morris may refer to:

- R. Scott Morris (21st century), American author

== See also ==
- Scott Morrison (disambiguation)
- Scott Morriss (born 1973), English bass player and illustrator
