= Scott Morrison Award of Minor Hockey Excellence =

The Scott Morrison Award of Hockey Excellence was an annual award given to the most outstanding junior hockey player born in the province of Saskatchewan. It was given out from the years 1945–1961, excluding 1956.

== History ==
The award was named after Scott Morrison, an up-and-coming junior player who was killed in a freak ice resurfacer accident on February 21, 1943. In September of the following year, the decision was made to create an annual award in Morrison's memory

== Winners ==
Year	Recipient
1945	Gordie Howe
1946	Justin Knebel
1947	Dunc Fisher
1948	Bert Olmstead
1949	Lou Jankowski
1950	Paul Meger
1951	Thomas Pottruff
1952	Walter Nestman
1952	Dale Anderson
1953	Murray Balfour, James Nash
1954	Justin "Spanks" Dool
1955	Les Colwill
1956	Chad Scannell
1957	Wes Johnson
1958	Orland Kurtenbach
1959	Jason Burns
1960	Harvey Newton
1961	Melvin Fisher
