= Ann Scott-Moncrieff =

Scottish writer (1914–1943)

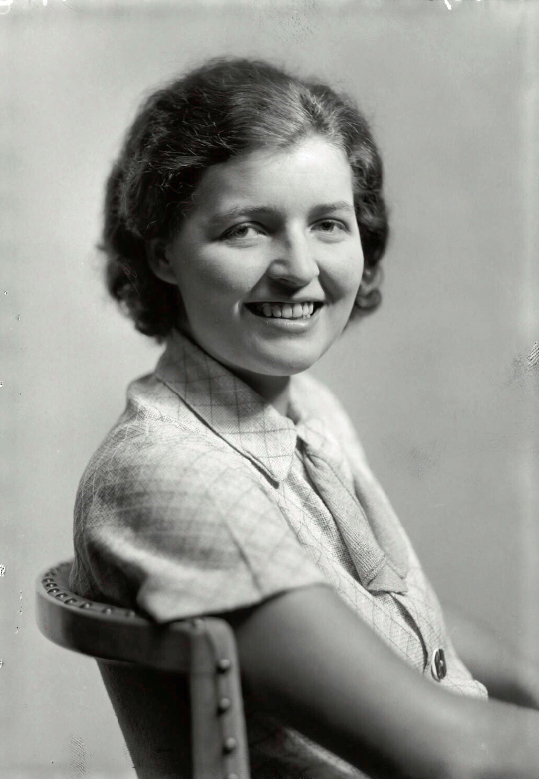
- Born: Ann Shearer; 1914; Kirkwall, Scotland
- Died: 1943 (aged 28–29)
- Occupation: Author

Ann Scott-Moncrieff (née Shearer) (1914–1943) was a Scottish author. She was born in Kirkwall, Orkney, Scotland, the daughter of Major J. D. M. Shearer. At the age of seventeen, she served her apprenticeship in journalism at The Orcadian. She studied archaeology at the University of Edinburgh and worked on Fleet Street, in London, where she met the Scottish novelist and topographer George Scott-Moncrieff. The couple married in 1934.

The Scott-Moncrieffs returned to Scotland, moving between Peeblesshire, Midlothian, Badenoch and Haddington as they contributed to small magazines, literary journals, broadsheets and radio programming.

Ann wrote original pieces and adapted literary classics, including Charles Kingsley's The Water-Babies and Susan Ferrier's Marriage, for broadcast by the BBC on Scottish Children's Hour and The Regional Programme. Her first published literary work was a children's story, Aboard the Bulger, which appeared as a serial in The Bulletin before its publication as a book. A volume of short stories, The White Drake and Other Tales, was compiled. Her last book, Auntie Robbo, was published in the United States in 1940.

Scott-Moncrieff died in 1943; she was memorialized in a poem by Edwin Muir. Her three children's books have been re-issued by Scotland Street Press. Four of her short stories, "The Longest Day", "Strong Girl", "Threesome" and "Nothatus", were republished in Chapman magazine in 1987.

== Bibliography ==
- Aboard the Bulger (1934*)
- The White Drake and Other Tales (1936)
- Auntie Robbo (1941)

=== New editions ===
- Auntie Robbo (Scotland Street Press, 2019)
- Aboard the Bulger (Scotland Street Press, 2020)
- Firkin and the Grey Gangsters (Scotland Street Press, 2021) (original title – The White Drake and Other Tales)
