= House of Lords Commissioner for Standards =

Position in the House of Lords

Since 2010 the United Kingdom House of Lords has had a post of House of Lords Commissioner for Standards. There was originally a single commissioner who was "responsible for the independent and impartial investigation of alleged breaches of the House of Lords Code of Conduct". In 2021 the decision was made to appoint two commissioners: Akbar Khan and Martin Jelley. Khan left in 2024 to take up a post in the judiciary, apparently leaving Jelley as the sole commissioner pending Margaret Obi taking up her appointment in 2025. Jelley's term ends in 2026.

Duties of the commissioners include investigating potential misuse of expenses and parliamentary facilities. Members' opinions, or the way they express themselves, do not fall within the scope of the code.

== Past commissioners ==
- Paul Kernaghan was appointed in 2010 as the first commissioner. Kernaghan previously had a police career culminating in a nine-year period as Chief Constable of Hampshire until 2008, followed by service as Head of Mission for the European Union Police Mission for the Palestinian Territories.
- Lucy Scott-Moncrieff, a former president of The Law Society, was appointed for five years from 1 June 2016.
- Akbar Khan was appointed with Martin Jelley in 2021, but stepped down in 2024.

== Investigations ==
Reports by the House of Lords Commissioner for Standards
Name of peer	Date	Allegation	Result
Lord Richards of Herstmonceux	February 2017	Minor breach (non-declaration of relevant interest)	Complaint upheld. Formal apology to Sub-Committee on Lords’ Conduct
Lord Tope	February 2019	Improper use of House of Lords facilities	Complaint dismissed
Lord Barker of Battle	February 2019	Payment for providing parliamentary advice or services Paid advocacy on behalf of Russian companies	Complaints dismissed
Lord Fairfax of Cameron	February 2019	Payment for providing parliamentary advice or services Paid advocacy on behalf of Russian companies	Complaints dismissed
Lord Hain	April 2019	Violation of the sub judice resolution Paid advocacy Abuse of parliamentary privilege by naming Philip Green	Complaint dismissed
Lord Singh of Wimbledon	April 2019	Non-registration and non-declaration of a relevant interest	Complaint upheld. Formal apology to Sub-Committee on Lords’ Conduct
Lord Deben	June 2019	Inaccurate descriptions of interests Non-declaration of relevant interests	Complaints dismissed
Baroness Meacher	June 2019	Non-declaration of relevant interest (Chair of Dignity in Dying)	Complaint upheld. Formal apology to Sub-Committee on Lords’ Conduct.
Lord Stone of Blackheath	October 2019	Harassment (Sexual and transphobic)	Complaint upheld. Required to take bespoke training to cover the incidents
Lord Black of Brentwood	December 2019	Insufficient description of the role of company Failure to declare relevant interest	Complaints upheld.: Required to amend company description; Formal apology to the Sub-Committee on Lords' Conduct
Lord Lea of Crondall	January 2020	Harassment and discrimination based on age and sex	Complaint upheld. Required to take bespoke training to cover the incidents
Lord Stevens of Kirkwhelpington	February 2020	Failure to declare nature of consultancy work performed by one of Lord Stevens' companies Failure to declare company that Lord Stevens held significant control over	Complaints upheld.: Required to correct register of interests; Formal apology to the Sub-Committee on Lords' Conduct
Baroness Meacher	June 2020	Improper of House of Lords stationery on non-parliamentary activity (Dignity in Dying)	Complaint upheld. Formal apology to Sub-Committee on Lords’ Conduct.
Lord Smith of Kelvin	June 2020	Failure to declare companies of which Lord Smith is a Director.	Complaints upheld.: Required to correct register of interests; Formal apology to the Sub-Committee on Lords' Conduct
Lord Adonis	June 2020	Failure to declare his interest as Non-Executive Director of HS2 Ltd Failure to declare a non-financial interest and advisory board position in the member's register of interests	Complaints upheld.: Required to correct register of interests; Formal apology to the Sub-Committee on Lords' Conduct
Lord Adonis	June 2020	Participation in the High Speed Rail (London–West Midlands) Bill without making relevant declarations	Complaint dismissed.
Lord Stone of Blackheath	July 2020	Harassment and discrimination based on religion, age and sex	Complaints upheld.: Required to continue attending training courses; Referral to the Lords' Standards Committee for further potential sanctions
Lord Lea of Crondall	August 2020	Bullying	Complaints upheld.: Required to continue attending training courses; Written apology to the victim
Benedict Rich (staff of Lord Lansley)	October 2020	Not specifying the consultancy work done in the register of interests.	Complaints upheld. Required to correct register of interest.
Benedict Rich (staff of Lord Lansley)	October 2020	Use of position in the House of Lords for the purpose of lobbying	Complaint dismissed.
Lord Ahmed	November 2020	Sexual misconduct Racism	The Committee recommended expulsion from the House of Lords. Lord Ahmed resigned prior to any sanctions being given.

== See also ==
- Parliamentary Commissioner for Standards
