= Scott Morrison (disambiguation) =

Scott Morrison (born 1968) is an Australian politician and Prime Minister of Australia from 2018 to 2022.

Scott Morrison or Scotty Morrison may also refer to:

== People ==
- Scott Morrison (footballer) (born 1984), retired Scottish footballer
- Scott Morrison (basketball player) (born 1986), Canadian professional basketball player
- Scott Morrison (basketball coach), Canadian basketball head coach
- Scott Morrison (journalist) (born 1958), Canadian sports writer
- Scott Morrison (designer), American designer and entrepreneur
- Scotty Morrison (broadcaster), New Zealand broadcaster and linguist
- Scotty Morrison (1930–2026), hockey referee and executive
- Joseph G. "Scottie" Morrison, Canadian ship builder; see List of steamboats on the Yukon River

== Other uses ==
- Scott Morrison Award of Minor Hockey Excellence, a Canadian award

== See also ==
- Scomo (disambiguation)
- Morrison (disambiguation)
- Scott (disambiguation)
