= Paul Masnick =

Canadian ice hockey player (1931–2024)

- Born: April 14, 1931 Regina, Saskatchewan, Canada
- Died: March 23, 2024 (aged 92) Barrie, Ontario, Canada
- Height: 5 ft 9 in (175 cm)
- Weight: 165 lb (75 kg; 11 st 11 lb)
- Position: Centre
- Shot: Right
- Played for: Montreal Canadiens; Chicago Black Hawks; Toronto Maple Leafs
- Playing career: 1949–1963

Paul Andrew Masnick (April 14, 1931 – March 23, 2024) was a Canadian professional ice hockey player. He played as centre in the National Hockey League (NHL) between 1950 and 1958.

== Playing career ==
Masnick started his National Hockey League (NHL) career with the Montreal Canadiens in 1950. He also played for the Chicago Black Hawks and Toronto Maple Leafs. Masnick left the NHL after the 1957–58 season, and retired in 1963. He won the Stanley Cup in 1953 with Montreal.

Masnick scored 18 goals in NHL regular season games and four goals in Stanley Cup games.

== Death ==
Masnick died in Barrie, Ontario on March 23, 2024. He was only weeks away from turning 93. He was the last surviving member of Canadiens 1953 Stanley Cup team.

== Career statistics ==
=== Regular season and playoffs ===
			Regular season					Playoffs
Season	Team	League	GP	G	A	Pts	PIM	GP	G	A	Pts	PIM
1948–49	Regina Pats	WCJHL	26	7	10	17	4	7	1	1	2	0
1949–50	Regina Pats	WCJHL	40	44	43	87	62	9	9	14	23	4
1949–50	Regina Pats	M-Cup	—	—	—	—	—	14	13	14	27	12
1950–51	Montreal Canadiens	NHL	43	4	1	5	14	11	2	1	3	4
1950–51	Cincinnati Mohawks	AHL	19	5	7	12	15	—	—	—	—	—
1951–52	Montreal Canadiens	NHL	15	1	2	3	2	6	1	0	1	12
1951–52	Cincinnati Mohawks	AHL	31	8	20	28	23	7	0	4	4	4
1952–53	Montreal Canadiens	NHL	53	5	7	12	44	6	1	0	1	7
1952–53	Montreal Royals	QSHL	10	6	6	12	10	—	—	—	—	—
1953–54	Montreal Canadiens	NHL	50	5	21	26	57	10	0	4	4	4
1953–54	Montreal Royals	QSHL	14	3	14	17	9	14	2	9	11	14
1954–55	Montreal Canadiens	NHL	19	0	1	1	0	—	—	—	—	—
1954–55	Chicago Black Hawks	NHL	11	1	0	1	8	—	—	—	—	—
1954–55	Montreal Royals	QSHL	27	10	13	23	14	—	—	—	—	—
1955–56	Winnipeg Warriors	WHL	62	29	39	68	37	14	11	9	20	14
1956–57	Rochester Americans	AHL	64	24	38	62	46	10	5	5	10	17
1957–58	Toronto Maple Leafs	NHL	41	2	9	11	14	—	—	—	—	—
1958–59	Saskatoon Quakers	WHL	64	24	51	75	48	—	—	—	—	—
1959–60	Vancouver Canucks	WHL	68	16	29	45	16	11	2	5	7	2
1960–61	Vancouver Canucks	WHL	11	0	0	0	16	—	—	—	—	—
1960–61	St. Paul Saints	IHL	30	12	23	35	20	9	5	4	9	7
1961–62	St. Paul Saints	IHL	60	31	59	90	34	11	2	6	8	12
1962–63	St. Paul Saints	IHL	31	11	21	32	4	—	—	—	—	—
NHL totals			232	18	41	59	139	33	4	5	9	27

== Awards and achievements ==
- Stanley Cup champion (1953)
