= Dick Gamble =

Canadian ice hockey player (1928–2018)

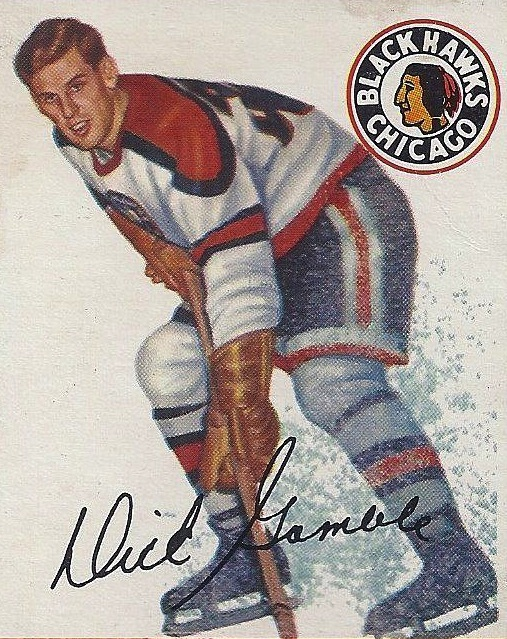
- Born: November 16, 1928 Moncton, New Brunswick, Canada
- Died: March 22, 2018 (aged 89) Rochester, New York, U.S.
- Height: 6 ft 0 in (183 cm)
- Weight: 178 lb (81 kg; 12 st 10 lb)
- Position: Left wing
- Shot: Left
- Played for: Montreal Canadiens; Chicago Blackhawks; Toronto Maple Leafs
- Playing career: 1946–1970

Richard Frank Gamble (November 16, 1928 – March 22, 2018) was a Canadian professional ice hockey player. He played in the National Hockey League for the Montreal Canadiens, Chicago Black Hawks, and Toronto Maple Leafs between 1950 and 1967. His career, which lasted from 1949 to 1970, was mainly spent in the American Hockey League.

Gamble won the Stanley Cup in 1953 with the Montreal Canadiens. He won the Calder Cup with the Rochester Americans in 1965, 1966, and 1968. During the 1967-1968 AHL Season, he led the league in scoring and won the Les Cunningham Award.

He served as the Americans player-coach in 1968–69 AHL Season. He retired as a player early in the 1969–70 AHL Season. Midway through the 1970-1971 AHL Season, he was replaced as Coach by Doug Adam.

The Americans retired Gamble's number 9 jersey along with Jody Gage. Gage broke Gamble's team scoring records while wearing number 9.

Gamble died at the age of 89 in 2018 from congestive heart failure.

== Career statistics ==
=== Regular season and playoffs ===
			Regular season					Playoffs
Season	Team	League	GP	G	A	Pts	PIM	GP	G	A	Pts	PIM
1944–45	Moncton Bruins	NBJHL	3	3	1	4	2	10	25	9	34	2
1945–46	Moncton Bruins	NBJHL	3	1	0	1	7	3	6	3	9	2
1945–46	Saint John Pontiacs	M-Cup	—	—	—	—	—	4	8	3	11	0
1945–46	Halifax St. Mary's	M-Cup	—	—	—	—	—	1	1	0	1	0
1946–47	Oshawa Generals	OHA	24	15	20	35	26	5	3	0	3	0
1947–48	Oshawa Generals	OHA	34	31	16	47	21	3	0	0	0	2
1948–49	Oshawa Generals	OHA	46	39	23	62	10	2	2	0	2	0
1949–50	Quebec Aces	QSHL	56	20	25	45	18	12	9	3	12	4
1950–51	Quebec Aces	QSHL	58	46	34	80	44	19	10	8	18	14
1950–51	Montreal Canadiens	NHL	1	0	0	0	0	—	—	—	—	—
1951–52	Montreal Canadiens	NHL	64	23	17	40	8	7	0	2	2	0
1952–53	Montreal Canadiens	NHL	69	11	13	24	26	5	1	0	1	2
1953–54	Montreal Canadiens	NHL	32	4	8	12	18	—	—	—	—	—
1953–54	Montreal Royals	QSHL	32	20	25	45	49	10	5	1	6	4
1954–55	Chicago Black Hawks	NHL	14	2	0	2	6	—	—	—	—	—
1954–55	Buffalo Bisons	AHL	45	38	21	59	26	10	4	4	8	6
1954–55	Montreal Canadiens	NHL	—	—	—	—	—	2	0	0	0	2
1955–56	Montreal Canadiens	NHL	12	0	3	3	8	—	—	—	—	—
1955–56	Quebec Aces	QSHL	52	23	24	47	45	7	4	5	9	14
1956–57	Quebec Aces	QSHL	63	35	14	49	28	10	4	4	8	8
1957–58	Buffalo Bisons	AHL	70	32	22	54	32	—	—	—	—	—
1958–59	Buffalo Bisons	AHL	70	31	30	61	24	11	2	2	4	14
1959–60	Buffalo Bisons	AHL	72	27	50	77	22	—	—	—	—	—
1960–61	Buffalo Bisons	AHL	72	40	36	76	18	4	2	0	2	6
1961–62	Rochester Americans	AHL	66	39	29	68	32	2	0	2	2	0
1962–63	Rochester Americans	AHL	70	35	22	57	16	2	0	1	1	0
1963–64	Rochester Americans	AHL	72	34	34	68	4	2	0	0	0	0
1964–65	Rochester Americans	AHL	70	48	29	77	16	10	5	8	13	6
1965–66	Toronto Maple Leafs	NHL	2	1	0	1	0	—	—	—	—	—
1965–66	Rochester Americans	AHL	71	47	51	98	22	12	2	9	11	16
1966–67	Toronto Maple Leafs	NHL	1	0	0	0	0	—	—	—	—	—
1966–67	Rochester Americans	AHL	72	46	37	83	22	13	4	2	6	8
1967–68	Rochester Americans	AHL	67	20	22	42	77	4	0	1	1	8
1968–69	Rochester Americans	AHL	74	30	37	67	37	—	—	—	—	—
1969–70	Rochester Americans	AHL	8	1	4	5	6	—	—	—	—	—
AHL totals			899	468	424	892	354	70	19	29	48	64
NHL totals			195	41	41	82	66	14	1	2	3	4
