= John McCormack (ice hockey) =

Canadian ice hockey player

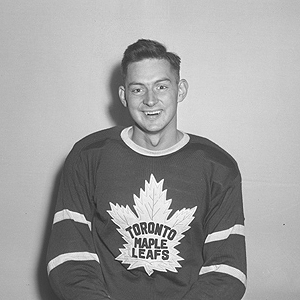
- Born: August 2, 1925 Edmonton, Alberta, Canada
- Died: February 22, 2017 (aged 91) Oshawa, Ontario, Canada
- Height: 6 ft 0 in (183 cm)
- Weight: 185 lb (84 kg; 13 st 3 lb)
- Position: Centre
- Shot: Left
- Played for: Toronto Maple Leafs; Montreal Canadiens; Chicago Black Hawks
- National team: Canada
- Playing career: 1947–1955

John Ronald McCormack (August 2, 1925 – February 22, 2017) was a Canadian ice hockey centre. He played in the National Hockey League with the Toronto Maple Leafs, Montreal Canadiens, and Chicago Black Hawks between 1948 and 1955. He was born in Edmonton, Alberta.

== Playing career ==
McCormack's hockey career started off in the local Edmonton hockey leagues. As a star in the Juvenile division, McCormack's coach was in touch with the coach of the Hollywood Wolves who had other Edmonton players such as Harry Black, the father of Bud Black, and a 16 he went to Southern California. When the war threatened to end the SCHL, McCormack found his way to the St. Michael's Majors in Toronto. The Majors won the Memorial Cup in 1945. In those 9 playoff games McCormack had 10 goals and assisted on 11 others. After the playoffs McCormack enlisted in the Royal Canadian Navy.

In 1948 John played 3 games for the Toronto Maple Leafs but spent the majority of the time with the Toronto Marlies. In 1949–50, the Marlies won the Allan Cup. John contributed 7 goals and 8 assists in the 13 playoff games.

In 1950 while with the AHL Pittsburgh Hornets, McCormack played in the Calder Cup final, though the Hornets lost to the Cleveland Barons in 7 games. McCormack had 6 goals and 9 assists in the 13 playoff matches.

McCormack played with the Stanley Cup winning Toronto Maple Leafs in 1950–51. After the season he was sold to the Montreal Canadiens. The Canadiens went on to win the Cup in 1953.

McCormack played in the NHL for 8 seasons finishing his career with the Chicago Black Hawks. He was traded to the Detroit Red Wings but he opted to retire and return to Edmonton as player coach for the hometown Flyers and to raise his family.

== Post-playing career ==
McCormack graduated from the University of Toronto in 1949. After a short stint in law school (Osgoode Hall) and rather than join the Leafs, he thought he would study for the priesthood and entered St. Joseph's Seminary in Edmonton. He discovered that the priesthood was not his calling and returned to play with the Leafs in 1950.

In 1951 McCormack married Margaret Anne Gordon, a recent nursing graduate from the Hospital for Sick Children. Conn Smythe, Leaf's owner, generously provide a honeymoon/demotion to Pittsburgh (Hornets AHL) for the couple.

McCormack went on to a successful business career mostly spent in the steel industry including starting his own business.

He died in 2017.

== Career statistics ==
=== Regular season and playoffs ===
			Regular season					Playoffs
Season	Team	League	GP	G	A	Pts	PIM	GP	G	A	Pts	PIM
1943–44	St. Michael's Majors	OHA	24	18	30	48	6	25	15	24	39	14
1943–44	St. Michael's Majors	M-Cup	—	—	—	—	—	1	1	1	2	2
1944–45	St. Michael's Majors	OHA	15	18	23	41	6	9	10	11	21	8
1944–45	Toronto Tip Tops	TIHL	1	1	1	2	0	14	8	16	24	8
1945–46	Tulsa Oilers	USHL	45	9	32	41	11	13	4	12	16	0
1947–48	Toronto Maple Leafs	NHL	3	0	1	1	0	—	—	—	—	—
1947–48	Toronto Marlboros	OHA Sr	33	28	49	77	10	5	0	4	4	2
1948–49	Toronto Maple Leafs	NHL	1	0	0	0	0	—	—	—	—	—
1948–49	Toronto Marlboros	OHA Sr	37	21	18	39	10	10	5	11	16	2
1948–49	Toronto Marlboros	Al-Cup	—	—	—	—	—	13	7	8	15	0
1949–50	Toronto Maple Leafs	NHL	34	6	5	11	0	6	1	0	1	0
1949–50	Toronto Marlboros	OHA Sr	29	17	33	50	14	—	—	—	—	—
1950–51	Toronto Maple Leafs	NHL	46	6	7	13	2	—	—	—	—	—
1950–51	Pittsburgh Hornets	AHL	17	4	12	16	0	12	6	9	15	2
1951–52	Montreal Canadiens	NHL	54	2	10	12	4	—	—	—	—	—
1951–52	Buffalo Bisons	AHL	8	5	3	8	0	—	—	—	—	—
1952–53	Montreal Canadiens	NHL	59	1	9	10	9	9	0	0	0	0
1953–54	Montreal Canadiens	NHL	51	5	10	15	12	7	0	1	1	0
1953–54	Buffalo Bisons	AHL	16	7	15	22	0	—	—	—	—	—
1954–55	Chicago Black Hawks	NHL	63	5	7	12	8	—	—	—	—	—
1955–56	Edmonton Flyers	WHL	37	6	9	15	6	—	—	—	—	—
NHL totals			311	25	49	74	35	22	1	1	2	0
