= Émile Bouchard =

Canadian ice hockey player (1919–2012)

CM CQ Émile Bouchard
- Hockey Hall of Fame, 1966
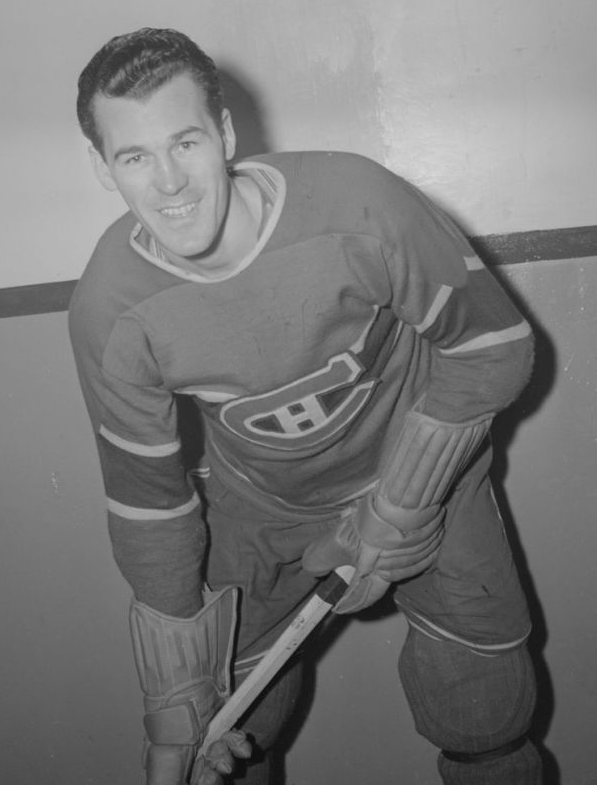
- Bouchard in 1945
- Born: September 4, 1919 Montreal, Quebec, Canada
- Died: April 14, 2012 (aged 92) Longueuil, Quebec, Canada
- Height: 6 ft 2 in (188 cm)
- Weight: 205 lb (93 kg; 14 st 9 lb)
- Position: Defence
- Shot: Right
- Played for: Montreal Canadiens
- Playing career: 1941–1956

Joseph Émile Alcide "Butch" Bouchard CM CQ (4 September 1919 – 14 April 2012) was a Canadian ice hockey player who played defence with the Montreal Canadiens in the National Hockey League (NHL) from 1941 to 1956. He is a member of the Hockey Hall of Fame, won four Stanley Cups, was captain of the Canadiens for eight years, and was voted to the NHL All-Star team four times. Although having a reputation as a clean player, he was also one of the strongest players and best body-checkers of his era. He excelled as a defensive defenceman, had superior passing skills, and was known for his leadership and mentoring of younger players. In his early years in the NHL, Bouchard, among other players, made a major contribution to reinvigorating what was at the time an ailing Canadien franchise.

He was born in Montreal, Quebec, and at the time of his death resided in Saint-Lambert, Quebec. In retirement, Bouchard was active with several business interests and contributions to his community. In 2008, he received the National Order of Quebec. On 4 December 2009, Bouchard's No. 3 was retired by the Canadiens as part of their 100th anniversary celebrations. On 30 December 2009, Michaëlle Jean, Governor General of Canada, announced Bouchard as among the appointments to the Order of Canada.

== Youth and learning the game ==
Bouchard was born in Montreal the son of Régina LaChapelle and Calixte Bouchard. Growing up poor during the depression, Bouchard did not begin skating until he was 16 and had to learn on rented skates, before borrowing $35 from his brother for a complete set of hockey equipment which included his pair of skates. Bouchard opted for a career in hockey over banking when he was offered $75 a week to play senior hockey and the bank paid $7. In the minors Bouchard played with the Verdun Maple Leafs, Montreal Junior Canadiens and Providence Reds. It was Verdun teammate Bob Fillion who gave Bouchard the nickname "Butch". It originated due to the resemblance of his last name to the English word "butcher". Bouchard was determined, strong and developed enough skills to impress coach Dick Irvin in the Canadiens' 1940–41 training camp after which he was signed as a free agent. Bouchard had arrived at training camp in peak condition, which was unusual for National Hockey League (NHL) players of the time. To attend this first training camp he rode a bike 50 miles (80 km), which also allowed him to pocket the travel expenses the Canadiens had allotted.

In an era when hockey players were regarded by hockey management as rural and unsophisticated, Bouchard had already developed his entrepreneurial skills. While still in high school he was working alongside an inspector with the Department of Agriculture when he came across a bee ranch owned by a priest who had just died. Borrowing $500 from his brother he bought the business. He turned it into an apiary of 200 hives which was so successful he earned enough to buy his parents a home. It was due to this business acuity that before signing with the Canadiens he uncovered what Ken Reardon and Elmer Lach, already playing with the Montreal, were currently earning. Then, for ten days he negotiated a larger contract than either player had been receiving, $3,750 ($72,441 in 2025 dollars).

== NHL career ==
=== Arrival to the Canadiens ===
Along with a strong work ethic and keen intellect, Bouchard was physically imposing. At 6 ft 3 in (1.91 m) and 207 pounds (94 kg) he was considered a giant compared to NHL players of the 1940s, when the average height was 5 ft 11 in (1.80 m) and average weight was 165 pounds (75 kg). Moreover, since he also practiced heavy weight training in an era before NHL players were concerned about upper body strength he became a very effective defensive presence. Hockey Hall of Fame leftwinger and teammate Dickie Moore said of Bouchard: "He appeared to have been chiseled out of stone."

By the time of Bouchard's arrival to the Montreal Canadiens, the club had not won the championship for 10 years and attendance at the Forum was very low, often less than 3,000 a game, and there was talk of folding the franchise. A few years earlier, in 1935, Canadien owners had seriously considered an offer to sell the team to be moved to Cleveland. After finishing last or near the bottom of the league for several years, the apathy of the fans was matched by the players themselves who had accepted losing as a way of hockey life. In his first training camp, he showcased his physical play by body-checking players, including veterans, with abandon. When the season started other teams discovered that with Bouchard in the lineup, they could no longer push Canadien players around. Bouchard's presence reinvigorated the Canadiens and he is credited with playing an important part in keeping the franchise from leaving Montreal.

However, Bouchard was more than just a physical presence. He learned to play good positional hockey and became skilled at passing the puck. He also possessed a flair for judging the flow of the game and knew when to join the attack and when to retreat. Despite his role as a stay-at-home defenceman, due to his skills for the long breakout pass, he was a contributor to the style of firewagon hockey for which the Canadiens exemplified.

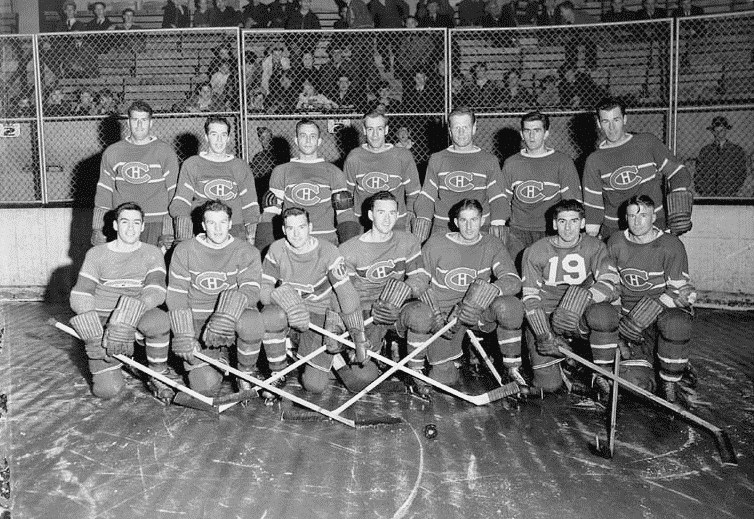
Team photo 1942 Montreal Canadiens. The team that pulled the ailing franchise back from the brink of moving. Bouchard back row far right.

Though he had an immediate impact on the team, Bouchard did not score many points for the team; in his first season, 1941–42, he collected six points in the regular season and scored the first NHL goal of his career in the Canadiens' first-round playoff loss to the Detroit Red Wings.

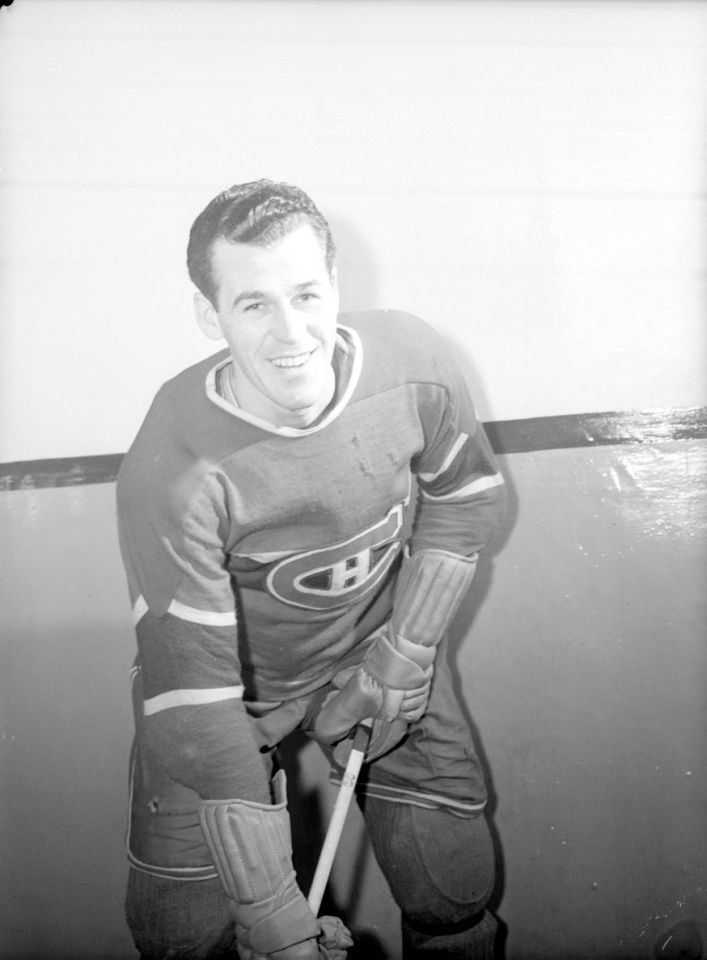
Bouchard in 1945

=== NHL star ===
The 1942–43 season was Bouchard's breakthrough year as he finished leading all Canadien defencemen in points and was key to the Canadiens' first season in several years without a losing record. They finished in fourth place with a record of 19 wins, 19 losses and 12 ties. Although they lost in the first round of the playoffs, the team was building in the right direction.

The 1943–44 season was Maurice Richard's first full season with the Canadiens. Richard was not just an exciting player to watch which served to increase attendance, but also had the offensive skills needed to turn the Canadiens into an exceptional team. The Canadiens proceeded to dominate the regular season finishing well ahead of second-place Detroit. In the playoffs in the first round against Toronto, after losing the opening game, they won the next four straight to win the series. Then, in the final, they swept Detroit in four games to win their first Stanley Cup in thirteen years. While the "Punch Line" of Richard, Toe Blake and Lach provided the offensive power it was Bouchard and goal-tender Bill Durnan who kept the goals out. During the regular season Montreal had allowed only 109 goals, 68 less than second-place Detroit. Bouchard along with Richard and Lach was named to the NHL All Stars' second team and goaltender Bill Durnan made the first team and won the Vezina. Bouchard had become one of the most reliable defencemen in the league. He would be named to the NHL First All-Star team, as one of the best defencemen in the league, for the next three seasons. He won his second Stanley Cup in 1945–46.

As physical on the ice as Bouchard was, he was also regarded as a clean player and only rarely participated in hockey fights. Immensely strong, most players avoided engaging him in fights and Bouchard more often would be the person to break up combatants. However, it was a fight involving Bouchard which led to a significant change in the role of referees. During the 1946–47 season, Bouchard became involved in a prolonged and one-sided fight with Boston's Terry Reardon. Due to the fight, Clarence Campbell, president of the NHL, added to the duties of referees; for the first time, they had the responsibility of breaking up fights. Then there was the time in March 1947, in a game in Boston, as the Canadiens were coming back onto the ice for the beginning of the third period, a female fan attacked Bouchard spearing him with a hat pin. Bouchard responded by pushing the woman away forcefully. A few moments later, Boston police were leading Bouchard out to a police car. According to Bouchard, Pat Egan of the Boston Bruins, interceded and talked the police out of the arrest.

For the 1947–48 season, defenceman Doug Harvey joined the team. Harvey developed into one of the NHL's premier offensive defencemen, and he and Bouchard formed a long-lasting and effective defensive pairing. Bouchard's positioning allowed Harvey to pursue the offensive rushes for which he later became known, with Bouchard providing defensive cover in the event Harvey lost possession of the puck.

=== Leader and mentor ===
In 1948, Bouchard became the first Quebec-born captain of the Canadiens, a position he retained for eight years until his retirement. At the time of his retirement no player had served more years as captain of the Canadiens than Bouchard. Hall of Famer Jean Béliveau, a teammate of Bouchard for Beliveau's early years with the Canadiens, said Bouchard was the model for his time as captain in the 1960s. Bouchard was a well-respected leader and played a role in supporting and mentoring the younger players. Never afraid to speak up to management, in 1950 on Bouchard's recommendation to Selke to "give the kid a shot", Bernie Geoffrion was given a tryout and eventually joined the Canadiens. Geoffrion won the Calder for rookie of the year and would be near the top of the league scoring for years to come. Bouchard commenting on the fact that he was nominated for captain by his teammates: "I don't agree with management nominating you. I can respond to players, not be a yes-man for the proprietor." He missed a large part of the 1948–49 season after a severe knee injury which threatened his career. Despite the medical opinion that he might not be able to continue to play he trained hard and was able to strengthen the knee enough to return to the Canadiens.

In 1951, Bouchard was involved in a legal first when he was a defendant in a lawsuit brought by a New York Rangers fan. The fan claimed Bouchard had struck him with his stick when he was waving to a friend watching the game on TV. Bouchard said the fan had raised his fist towards a fellow Canadiens player who was being taken off the ice with an injury and his stick hit the fan accidentally as he tried to ward off the blow. In what may have been the first time in legal history, evidence was taken during a trial from someone witnessing an event on television as the fan's friend testified he had seen Bouchard strike the blow. Bouchard won the case when Otis Guernsey, president of Abercrombie and Fitch, who was at the game, testified he heard "vile language" and saw the fan raise his fist and not wave.

On 28 February 1953, the Canadiens had a "Bouchard Night at the Forum". Bouchard was honoured in a ceremony during the second intermission in a game against the Detroit Red Wings. It was presided over by Montreal Mayor Camillien Houde and broadcast nationally live over the CBC. Among the gifts Bouchard received was a Buick automobile which was driven out onto the ice. The organizer planned to have Bouchard drive off in the car at the end of the ceremony. However, sitting in the car Bouchard discovered the keys were missing. To the roar of the crowd Ted Lindsay, captain of the Red Wings, returned the keys he had stolen and congratulated Bouchard on behalf of the Red Wings.

In 1952–53, Montreal and Detroit battled for first place with Detroit coming out on top by the end of the season. In the first round of the playoffs, the heavily favoured Detroit Red Wings were upset by the Boston Bruins and Montreal won a close seven-game series over the Chicago Black Hawks. The Canadiens then defeated Boston in five games and Bouchard won his third Stanley Cup.

Eventually, injuries began to take their toll and after the 1954–55 season he considered retirement. Toe Blake, who had taken over as coach, talked him into playing one more season to assist the younger players. Bouchard recognized Blake's value as a "player's coach" and used his leadership as captain to ease the transition and encourage Blake's acceptance by the Canadiens players. Due to physical problems Bouchard was forced to miss the last half of the season and the playoffs. However, in the deciding game of the Stanley Cup Finals against Detroit, Blake dressed Bouchard. As the final seconds counted down, with Montreal up 3–1, Blake put Bouchard on the ice and he was able to end his career with one more Stanley Cup celebration.

== Personal life ==
In 1947, Bouchard married Marie-Claire Macbeth, a painter. They had five children, Émile Jr., Jean, Michel, Pierre and Susan.

In the 1970s, his son Pierre Bouchard, also a defenceman, played for the Montreal Canadiens. While father Émile participated in the birth of the Montreal Canadiens' dynasty, thirty years later son Pierre played a part in continuing the Canadien dynasty into the 1970s. With Butch's four and Pierre's five they have the distinction of winning the most Stanley Cups of any father-son combination in NHL history. Bobby and Brett Hull are the only other father and son to have won the Cup.

In retirement, Bouchard remained as active as he was during his NHL career. He received coaching offers soon after his retirement, but his business interests prevented him from leaving Montreal. Bouchard owned a popular restaurant Chez Émile Bouchard which operated for many years in Montreal. On 22 March 1953, while Bouchard was travelling to Detroit for the last game of the season, the restaurant was gutted by a fire started in a basement at 3:22am soon after employees and patrons had left. He was also president of the Montreal Royals Triple-A baseball club, elected to the Longueuil municipal council, on the board of directors of Ste. Jeanne-d'Arc Hospital, president of the Metropolitan Junior "A" Hockey League among other activities.

Bouchard was unafraid to speak his mind when he felt the occasion demanded. In 1957, after an International League game in Toronto between his Montreal Royals and the Maple Leafs baseball team President Bouchard complained about Toronto's excessive conference trips to the mound. He called the Leafs "showspoilers" and then said, for the entire press room to hear, "They're a lot of punks, just like in hockey!"

Bouchard was a tough opponent even outside of hockey. When the Mafia of the day in Montreal attempted to intimidate him into hiring their people for his restaurant, Bouchard invited the head man to Chez Butch Bouchard for dinner. Bouchard's wife, Marie-Claire, recalled he told them, "Il lui a dit over my dead body. Je n'embaucherai jamais un de tes hommes." which translates "Over my dead body, I will never hire one of your men."

A reporter once asked the canny Bouchard what he thought of coaching methods in the NHL. He replied, "Hockey should be more like football, with a coach for the defence, one for the offence, and maybe one for the goalies." Indicative of his usual foresight it would be many years before such practices would become common in the NHL.

He died in 2012 at the age of 92.

== Honours and recognition ==
Bouchard was one of nine players and one builder elected to the Hockey Hall of Fame in 1966. On 15 October 2008, the Montreal Canadiens celebrated their 100th season by unveiling the Ring of Honour, an exhibit along the wall of the upper deck of the Bell Centre, paying tribute to their 44 players and 10 builders who are members of the Hockey Hall of Fame. Bouchard along with Elmer Lach, the two oldest surviving members, were on hand to drop the ceremonial puck at centre ice.

In 2008, a grassroots movement had begun to pressure Canadien management to retire Bouchard's #3. During the Quebec provincial election Independent candidate Kevin Côté made one of his platforms to force Canadiens into retiring the number. By March 2009 it reached the Quebec National Assembly where a motion was presented and carried "That the National Assembly support the steps taken and supported by the population of Québec in order that Montreal Canadiens management retire the sweater of Émile "Butch" Bouchard eminent defenceman from 1941 to 1956."

On 4 December 2009, as part of an 85-minute pre-game ceremony celebrating the Canadiens' 100th anniversary, Bouchard's No. 3 and Elmer Lach's No. 16 were retired. They become the 16th and 17th Canadien players to have their numbers retired.

On 18 June 2008, Bouchard received the National Order of Quebec (L'Ordre national du Québec) presented to him by the Premier of Quebec Jean Charest. On 30 December 2009, he was made a Member of the Order of Canada "for his contributions to sports, particularly professional hockey, and for his commitment to his community".

== Awards and achievements ==
- Member of the Order of Canada (2009)
- National Order of Quebec Chevalier (2008).
- Inducted into the Hockey Hall of Fame in 1966.
- Stanley Cup champion: 1944, 1946, 1953, 1956
- NHL first All-Star team: 1945, 1946, 1947
- NHL second All-Star team: 1944
- The QMJHL's Defenceman of the Year Trophy (Emile Bouchard Trophy) is named in his honour.

== Career statistics ==
=== Regular season and playoffs ===
			Regular season					Playoffs
Season	Team	League	GP	G	A	Pts	PIM	GP	G	A	Pts	PIM
1937–38	Verdun Maple Leafs	MCJHL	2	0	0	0	2	7	2	1	3	10
1938–39	Verdun Maple Leafs	MCJHL	9	1	1	2	20	10	0	2	2	12
1939–40	Verdun Maple Leafs	MCJHL	—	—	—	—	—	—	—	—	—	—
1940–41	Montreal Jr. Canadiens	QSHL	31	2	8	10	60	—	—	—	—	—
1940–41	Providence Reds	AHL	12	3	1	4	8	3	0	1	1	8
1941–42	Montreal Canadiens	NHL	44	0	6	6	38	3	1	1	2	0
1942–43	Montreal Canadiens	NHL	45	2	16	18	47	5	0	1	1	4
1943–44	Montreal Canadiens	NHL	39	5	14	19	52	9	1	3	4	4
1944–45	Montreal Canadiens	NHL	50	11	23	34	34	6	3	4	7	4
1945–46	Montreal Canadiens	NHL	45	7	10	17	52	9	2	1	3	17
1946–47	Montreal Canadiens	NHL	60	5	7	12	60	11	0	3	3	21
1947–48	Montreal Canadiens	NHL	60	4	6	10	78	—	—	—	—	—
1948–49	Montreal Canadiens	NHL	27	3	3	6	42	7	0	0	0	6
1949–50	Montreal Canadiens	NHL	69	1	7	8	88	5	0	2	2	2
1950–51	Montreal Canadiens	NHL	52	3	10	13	80	11	1	1	2	2
1951–52	Montreal Canadiens	NHL	60	3	9	12	45	11	0	2	2	14
1952–53	Montreal Canadiens	NHL	58	2	8	10	55	12	1	1	2	6
1953–54	Montreal Canadiens	NHL	70	1	10	11	89	11	2	1	3	4
1954–55	Montreal Canadiens	NHL	70	2	15	17	81	12	0	1	1	37
1955–56	Montreal Canadiens	NHL	36	0	3	3	22	1	0	0	0	0
NHL totals			785	49	145	194	863	113	11	21	32	123

Career statistics from Total Hockey

== See also ==
- List of NHL players who spent their entire career with one franchise

Preceded by Bill Durnan	Montreal Canadiens captain 1948–56	Succeeded by Maurice Richard
