= Lorne Davis =

Canadian ice hockey player and scout

- Born: July 20, 1930 Lumsden, Saskatchewan, Canada
- Died: December 20, 2007 (aged 77) Regina, Saskatchewan, Canada
- Height: 5 ft 11 in (180 cm)
- Weight: 190 lb (86 kg; 13 st 8 lb)
- Position: Right wing
- Shot: Right
- Played for: Montreal Canadiens; Boston Bruins; Detroit Red Wings; Chicago Black Hawks
- Playing career: 1949–1965

Lorne Austin Davis (July 20, 1930 – December 20, 2007) was a Canadian ice hockey player, and later a scout. He played for four teams in the National Hockey League between 1951 and 1960, with the rest of his career spent in the minor leagues. After retiring he became a scout and worked with the Edmonton Oilers from 1979 to 2008. Internationally Davis played for the Canadian national team at the 1966 World Championship, winning a bronze medal. He was born in Lumsden, Saskatchewan, but grew up in Regina, Saskatchewan.

== Playing career ==
Davis spent most of his fifteen-year pro career playing for minor-league teams, with occasional call-ups to the Montreal Canadiens (with whom he won a Stanley Cup in 1953), Chicago Black Hawks, Detroit Red Wings, and Boston Bruins. In 1964–65, he was a player-coach for the Muskegon Zephyrs of the International Hockey League. After his retirement, he went on to coach his former junior team, the Western Hockey League's Regina Pats, and then the New York Rangers before becoming a scout for the Edmonton Oilers. He received five more Stanley Cup rings for his work as a scout of the Oilers (1984, 1985, 1987, 1988, 1990), and his name was put on the Stanley Cup in 1985, 1987, and 1990. Davis remained employed by the club until he died in late 2007.

== Career statistics ==
=== Regular season and playoffs ===
			Regular season					Playoffs
Season	Team	League	GP	G	A	Pts	PIM	GP	G	A	Pts	PIM
1947–48	Regina Pats	SJHL	28	8	5	13	7	5	1	1	2	2
1948–49	Regina Pats	WCJHL	26	16	12	28	36	7	5	3	8	4
1949–50	Regina Pats	WCJHL	40	25	17	42	22	9	6	1	7	8
1949–50	Regina Pats	M-Cup	—	—	—	—	—	17	7	5	12	6
1950–51	Victoria Cougars	PCHL	3	1	1	2	0	—	—	—	—	—
1950–51	Montreal Royals	QSHL	50	14	17	31	4	7	5	1	6	4
1951–52	Vancouver Canucks	PCHL	55	11	10	21	4	—	—	—	—	—
1951–52	Buffalo Bisons	AHL	48	19	19	38	18	3	1	0	1	0
1951–52	Montreal Canadiens	NHL	3	1	1	2	2	—	—	—	—	—
1952–53	Buffalo Bisons	AHL	64	33	34	67	49	—	—	—	—	—
1952–53	Montreal Canadiens	NHL	—	—	—	—	—	7	1	1	2	2
1953–54	Montreal Royals	QHL	37	13	22	35	25	—	—	—	—	—
1953–54	Montreal Canadiens	NHL	37	6	4	10	2	11	2	0	2	8
1954–55	Montreal Royals	QHL	1	0	2	2	0	—	—	—	—	—
1954–55	Detroit Red Wings	NHL	22	0	5	5	2	—	—	—	—	—
1954–55	Chicago Black Hawks	NHL	8	0	0	0	4	—	—	—	—	—
1954–55	Edmonton Flyers	WHL	29	11	5	16	10	9	7	4	11	2
1955–56	Hershey Bears	AHL	45	19	21	40	42	—	—	—	—	—
1955–56	Boston Bruins	NHL	15	0	1	1	0	—	—	—	—	—
1956–57	Hershey Bears	AHL	64	16	24	40	55	7	1	0	1	2
1957–58	Hershey Bears	AHL	68	18	16	34	36	11	0	0	0	12
1958–59	Providence Reds	AHL	70	22	24	46	65	—	—	—	—	—
1959–60	Providence Reds	AHL	54	19	32	51	24	—	—	—	—	—
1959–60	Boston Bruins	NHL	10	1	1	2	10	—	—	—	—	—
1959–60	Calgary Spurs	Al-Cup	3	1	0	1	0	—	—	—	—	—
1960–61	Winnipeg Warriors	WHL	70	22	22	44	18	—	—	—	—	—
1962–63	Regina Capitals	SSHL	20	14	16	30	14	7	3	11	14	8
1963–64	Regina Capitals	SSHL	37	43	47	90	4	1	1	0	1	0
1964–65	Muskegon Zephyrs	IHL	67	20	39	59	30	—	—	—	—	—
1965–66	Regina Capitals	SSHL	11	8	19	27	0	—	—	—	—	—
1966–67	Regina Capitals	SSHL	33	22	22	44	17	—	—	—	—	—
AHL totals			413	146	170	316	289	21	2	0	2	14
NHL totals			95	8	12	20	20	18	3	1	4	10

=== International ===
Medal record

Representing Canada

Men's ice hockey

World Championships
Bronze medal – third place	1966 Yugoslavia	

Year	Team	Event	GP	G	A	Pts	PIM
1966	Canada	WC	7	1	0	1	2
Senior totals			7	1	0	1	2

== Awards and achievements ==
- AHL Second All-Star Team (1953)
- Played in NHL All-Star Game (1953)
- NHL - Stanley Cup (Edmonton) (1987 and 1990)
