= George Scott-Moncrieff =

Scottish author

- Born: 9 April 1910; Morningside, Edinburgh
- Died: 11 March 1974 (aged 63); Peeblesshire
- Occupations: Novelist, playwright, poet, journalist, editor, author

George Irving Scott-Moncrieff (9 April 1910 – 11 March 1974) was a Scottish novelist, playwright, poet, journalist, editor, and author of several well-known books on Scotland.

== Early life and education ==
George Scott-Moncrieff was born in Morningside, Edinburgh, the younger son of Rev. Colin William Scott-Moncrieff and Constance Elizabeth Hannah Lunn. He was a nephew of the famous translator C. K. Scott Moncrieff. His elder brother, Colin Herbert (8 November 1908 – November 1941), was killed in action in Libya. He was educated at Edinburgh Academy and Aldenham School in Hertfordshire, England.

== Career ==
Scott-Moncrieff's first novel Café Bar was published in 1932. He married his first wife Ann Shearer in 1936, having met her in London where they both worked as journalists. Under her influence he converted from the Scottish Episcopal Church to the Roman Catholic Church. He lived with his first wife in Breakacky near Kingussie, then Dalwhinnie, and finally Edinburgh. After her death at the age of 29, he moved to the Isle of Eigg in 1945 and lived there a hermit-like existence in a simple cottage for about five years. His novel Death's Bright Shadow (1948) is a fictional account of his grief. He moved back to Edinburgh in 1951 and eventually married Eileen née Ward, only daughter of the American illustrator Keith Ward. Upon his death he was survived by Eileen and seven children from the two marriages.

The defence of tradition runs through all of Scott-Moncrieff's writings – his books about Scottish architecture and religion, his plays, his novels, his poems, his very popular and often reprinted history of the Catholic Church in Scotland, his many book reviews, his moving little volume of religious meditations. In a facetious reference to Balmoral Castle, Scott-Moncrieff coined the term "Balmorality" to criticize both Scotland's cultural accommodation since the Jacobite risings with both the House of Hanover and the British Empire and the superficial idealization of Highland Scottish culture begun by Queen Victoria and Prince Albert. In 1951, he wrote Living Traditions of Scotland, a booklet published on behalf of the Council of Industrial Design Scottish Committee to accompany the Living Traditions exhibition of architecture and crafts held in Edinburgh as part of the Festival of Britain.

He died in Peeblesshire and is buried in Traquair Churchyard.

== Selected publications ==
- Café Bar. 1932.
- Tinkers' Wind: The Saga of a Cheapjack. 1933.
- Lowlands of Scotland. 1939. 15 editions published between 1939 and 1983
- Death's Bright Shadow. 1946.
- Edinburgh. With 114 illus. from engravings, paintings and photos. 1947. 42 editions published between 1947 and 1967
- Living Traditions of Scotland. 1951.
- Scottish islands. 1952.
- Scotland's dowry. 1956.
- Burke Street. 1956.
- This Day. With a foreword by James Walsh. 1959.
- The mirror and the cross: Scotland and the Catholic faith. 1960. 13 editions published between 1960 and 1961
- Scotland, land of colour. 1961.
- Border abbeys. 1964.
- The beauty of Scotland in colour. 1965.
- Getting around Edinburgh: The complete guide for visitors. A pictorial guide. s.d., 25th ed.
- as editor:
  - Scottish country; fifteen essays by Scottish authors, edited with an introduction by George Scott-Moncrieff. 1935.
  - The stones of Scotland, edited by George Scott-Moncrieff, with contributions by W. Douglas Simpson, G.P.H. Watson, W. Mackay Mackenzie, Ian G. Lindsay and Ian C. Hannah; illustrated from photographs. 1938. 11 editions published between 1938 and 1983
  - Selected essays by Robert Louis Stevenson, edited by George Scott-Moncrieff. Chicago: Henry Regnery Co. 1959.
