= Bud MacPherson =

Canadian ice hockey player (1927–1988)

- Born: March 31, 1927 Edmonton, Alberta, Canada
- Died: August 31, 1988 (aged 61) Edmonton, Alberta, Canada
- Height: 6 ft 4 in (193 cm)
- Weight: 20 lb (9 kg; 1 st 6 lb)
- Position: Defence
- Shot: Left
- Played for: Montreal Canadiens
- Playing career: 1947–1961

James Albert "Bud" MacPherson (March 31, 1927 – August 31, 1988) was a Canadian ice hockey defenceman. He played 259 games in the National Hockey League with the Montreal Canadiens from 1949 to 1957. With Montreal, he won the Stanley Cup in 1953. The rest of his career lasted from 1947 to 1961 and was spent in the minor leagues. He was inducted to the Alberta Sports Hall of Fame and Museum in 2005 as a member of the 1947-48 Edmonton Flyers Hockey Team.

== Career statistics ==
=== Regular season and playoffs ===
			Regular season					Playoffs
Season	Team	League	GP	G	A	Pts	PIM	GP	G	A	Pts	PIM
1943–44	Edmonton Maple Leafs	AJHL	—	—	—	—	—	—	—	—	—	—
1944–45	Edmonton Canadians	EJrHL	—	—	—	—	—	—	—	—	—	—
1945–46	Edmonton Canadians	EJrHL	—	—	—	—	—	—	—	—	—	—
1946–47	Oshawa Generals	OHA	11	1	0	1	8	2	0	1	1	7
1947–48	Edmonton Flyers	WCSHL	37	8	11	19	21	10	0	0	0	41
1947–48	Edmonton Flyers	Al-Cup	—	—	—	—	—	14	3	3	6	26
1948–49	Montreal Canadiens	NHL	3	0	0	0	2	—	—	—	—	—
1948–49	Edmonton Flyers	WCSHL	44	5	17	22	65	9	0	3	3	10
1949–50	Cincinnati Mohawks	AHL	41	2	9	11	38	—	—	—	—	—
1950–51	Montreal Canadiens	NHL	62	0	16	16	40	11	0	2	2	8
1950–51	Cincinnati Mohawks	AHL	6	0	0	0	10	—	—	—	—	—
1951–52	Montreal Canadiens	NHL	54	2	1	3	24	11	0	0	0	0
1952–53	Montreal Canadiens	NHL	2	3	5	67	4	0	1	1	9
1953–54	Montreal Canadiens	NHL	41	0	5	5	41	3	0	0	0	4
1953–54	Montreal Royals	QSHL	5	0	2	2	12	—	—	—	—	—
1953–54	Buffalo Bisons	AHL	8	0	1	1	6	—	—	—	—	—
1954–55	Montreal Canadiens	NHL	30	1	8	9	55	—	—	—	—	—
1955–56	Montreal Royals	QSHL	31	2	9	11	63	13	2	1	3	30
1956–57	Montreal Canadiens	NHL	10	0	0	0	4	—	—	—	—	—
1956–57	Montreal Royals	QSHL	46	3	10	13	53	4	0	1	1	4
1956–57	Rochester Americans	AHL	7	0	3	3	12	—	—	—	—	—
1957–58	Edmonton Flyers	WHL	70	5	22	27	57	5	0	1	1	4
1958–59	Edmonton Flyers	WHL	63	3	13	16	54	3	1	1	2	12
1958–59	Hershey Bears	AHL	—	—	—	—	—	10	0	2	2	6
1959–60	Edmonton Flyers	WHL	62	7	12	19	20	4	0	1	1	4
1960–61	Edmonton Flyers	WHL	11	0	1	1	8	—	—	—	—	—
NHL totals			259	5	33	38	233	29	0	3	3	21
