= Lucy Scott-Moncrieff =

British lawyer (born 1954)

Lucy Scott-Moncrieff CBE
- Born: March 1954 (age 72); Aldershot, Hampshire, England
- Education: Guildford College; University of Kent; University of Law
- Occupation: Lawyer
- Known for: Former House of Lords Commissioner for Standards

Lucy Ann Scott-Moncrieff (born March 1954) is a British lawyer and a former House of Lords commissioner for standards. She specialises in mental health and human rights law.

== Early and personal life ==
Scott-Moncrieff was born in March 1954 in Aldershot, Hampshire. She was educated at Guildford College. She studied Law at the University of Kent from 1972 to 1975. She attended the College of Law, Guildford, at the University of Law.

Scott-Moncrieff lives in North West London.

== Career ==
Scott-Moncrieff qualified in 1978. In 1986 she joined a sub-committee dealing with the first Law Society specialist panel. She had roles in criminal law at the London firms Offenbach and Bradbury.

Scott-Moncrieff founded the solicitors' firm Scott-Moncrieff & Associates Ltd in 1987, "as she wanted the flexibility of self-employment to combine work with motherhood". It was the first virtual solicitors' firm in the world, in which all the lawyers are self-employed consultants working from home or their own offices. At the time, Scott-Moncrieff was starting to specialise in mental health and human rights law. She is managing director of the firm.

She spent most of her career representing mentally disordered offenders detained in high secure hospitals.

She was elected to the Law Society Council in January 2002. She was President of The Law Society from 2012 to 2013, and then chaired its Equality, Diversity and Inclusion Committee for five years.

Scott-Moncrieff has been a Mental Health Act commissioner and a founder member of the QC Appointments Panel, and was a commissioner at the Postal Services Commission from 2008 to 2011.

Scott-Moncrieff was appointed House of Lords Commissioner for Standards for five years beginning on 1 June 2016. The role was openly advertised. She succeeded Paul Kernaghan.

In December 2017 she was appointed to the members' advisory board of mutual Wesleyan.

She is a former patron of the Kent Law Campaign, to raise funds for the Wigoder Law Building at the University of Kent.

Martin Jelley and Akbar Khan took over from her as House of Lords Commissioner for Standards from 1 June and 1 July 2021 respectively.

Scott-Moncrieff was accused by peers of using "bullying" letters to persuade them to attend a course to combat bullying, discrimination and sexual harassment.

In July 2021, The Telegraph reported that Scott-Moncrieff had been engaged in a legal battle with the freeholder at her home in North West London after she built a wild swimming pond.

Scott-Moncrieff is Co-Chair of the Legal Aid and Access to Justice Committee of the International Bar Association. She has been a commissioner with the Judicial Appointments Committee. She is a mental health tribunal judge. She also sits as a judge for the Court of Protection. She is a member of the Bach Commission on Access to Justice. She is an associate with Verita, which carries out investigations on behalf of public bodies.

== Awards and honours ==
In 2005 Scott-Moncrieff was named "Mental Health Legal Aid Lawyer of the Year".

In 2009 Scott-Moncrieff was made an Honorary Doctor of Laws at the University of Kent.

In 2011 she won the Association of Women Solicitors award for best manager of a legal aid practice. She was appointed Commander of the Most Excellent Order of the British Empire (CBE) in the 2014 New Year Honours for services to legal aid.

In October 2019 Scott-Moncrieff was awarded the "Lifetime Achievement Award" by The Law Society for "her outstanding contribution to the legal profession".

Government offices
Preceded by Paul Kernaghan	House of Lords Commissioner for Standards; 2016–2021	Succeeded by Martin Jelley; Akbar Khan
