= Elmer Lach =

Canadian ice hockey player (1918–2015)

- Hockey Hall of Fame, 1966
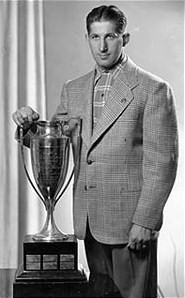
- Lach with the Hart Memorial Trophy in 1945
- Born: January 22, 1918 Nokomis, Saskatchewan, Canada
- Died: April 4, 2015 (aged 97) Kirkland, Quebec, Canada
- Height: 5 ft 10 in (178 cm)
- Weight: 165 lb (75 kg; 11 st 11 lb)
- Position: Centre
- Shot: Left
- Played for: Montreal Canadiens
- Playing career: 1940–1954

Elmer James Lach (/ˈlɑːk/ LAHK, January 22, 1918 – April 4, 2015) was a Canadian professional ice hockey player who played 14 seasons for the Montreal Canadiens in the National Hockey League (NHL). A centre, he was a member of the Punch line, along with Maurice Richard and Toe Blake. Lach led the NHL in scoring twice and was awarded the Hart Trophy in 1945 as the league's most valuable player.

He won three Stanley Cups with Montreal. When Lach retired in 1954, he was the league's all-time leading scorer and was inducted into the Hockey Hall of Fame twelve years later. His number 16 was retired on December 4, 2009, during the Montreal Canadiens centennial celebrations. In 2017 Lach was named one of the '100 Greatest NHL Players' in history.

== Early life ==
Lach was born in Nokomis, Saskatchewan, a small town 133 kilometres (83 mi) north of Regina. Elmer was the youngest of two boys and four girls born to William and Mary-Ann Lach, who arrived in Canada from Eastern Europe in 1910. Lach's father was at first a farmer, then took a job as the head of public works for Nokomis, population 550. Lach played ice hockey for his school team, starting at age 12. Against the wishes of his Baptist parents, Elmer would sneak away to play ice hockey on a local pond instead of attending church on Saturday mornings.

Lach began playing junior ice hockey with the Regina Abbotts in the 1935–36 season, arranged by a Nokomis doctor with contacts in Regina. In Regina, Lach would work at the team's owner's pool hall, racking balls for 25 cents per day. He played the two following seasons with the senior Weyburn Beavers of the Saskatchewan Senior Hockey League (SSHL). He moved again in 1938 to star for two seasons for the senior Moose Jaw Millers, playing hockey in the winter for $75 a month and baseball in the summer, where he would be paid $2.50 per game behind the plate. In his first season with the Millers, he led them in assists, with 20, and was the leading playoff scorer. He also scored 17 regular-season goals. The next season, he scored 15 goals and 29 assists and led in playoff scoring again. Lach was also noted for his defensive contributions.

In 1937, Lach, along with future Hockey Hall of Fame member Doug Bentley attended the Toronto Maple Leafs training camp; both were rejected as too small for the National Hockey League. According to Lach, Conn Smythe, manager of the Leafs, saw Lach and Bentley and said "They were sending me big guys from the West, but instead they’ve sent me peanuts."

It was during his time in Moose Jaw that Lach met his future wife, Kay Fletcher. Lach had a job reading meters for the National Light & Power Co., and one day he met Kay in her home. They married in 1941. That same year, Lach's mother died and his father moved to Vancouver, beginning a lifelong estrangement from his son. In 1945, Elmer and Kay celebrated the birth of their only child, son Ron. Ron was born while Elmer was on the road with the Canadiens. Ron would later have a son named after Elmer, named Trevor James Lach.According to Montreal Gazette columnist Dave Stubbs, Elmer wired Kay the message "Nice going, honey."

== Career ==
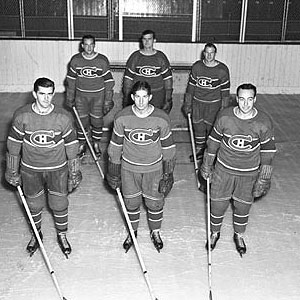
The Punch line: Maurice Richard (bottom left), Elmer Lach (centre), and Toe Blake (bottom right)

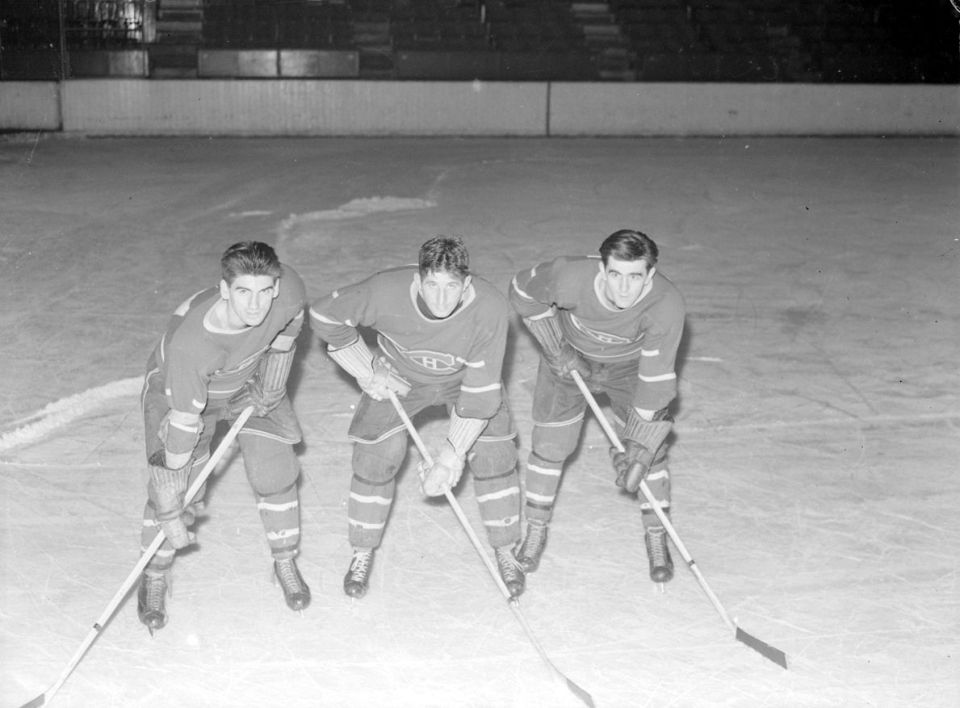
The Broken Bone line: Maurice Richard, Elmer Lach and Tony Demers in 1942

Rejecting the Maple Leafs' assessment, the Montreal Canadiens signed Lach as a free agent on October 24, 1940. With the arrangement of Moose Jaw's owner Cliff Henderson, Montreal player-scout Paul Haynes paid Lach $100 for his rights, "more money than I'd had in my pocket in my life.". He came to the Canadiens' training camp with only an overnight bag, not expecting to be offered a contract. Henderson had encouraged Lach to go, expecting him to return in time for the Millers' training camp, and be in better shape for it, but Lach never returned to the Millers.

In his first NHL season, Lach played 43 games, scoring seven goals and adding 14 assists. He was limited to only one game the following season, after crashing into the boards in the first game, dislocating his shoulder, fracturing his wrist, and injuring his elbow. He returned the following season to score 58 points in 45 games. A highlight of the 1942–43 season came when he set a still-standing Canadiens record of six assists in one game on February 6, 1943.

In the 1943–44 season, Montreal head coach Dick Irvin tried a line combination of Lach at centre, Maurice Richard on the right wing, and Toe Blake at left. This line became known as the Punch line and dominated the NHL for four seasons. In the first season of the Punch line, Lach played 48 games, scoring on average an assist per game; he also added 24 goals. After the season, Lach was named to the Second All-Star Team. Montreal won the Stanley Cup, his first with the team, sweeping the Chicago Black Hawks in the Stanley Cup Final series.

In the 1944–45 season, Lach played in all 50 games, picking up a league-leading 80 points, of which 26 were goals and 54 were assists. That season, linemate Maurice Richard became the first player in the NHL to score 50 goals in 50 games. The Punch line amassed 220 points in total for the season, an NHL record until the 1960s. Lach won the Hart Trophy as the league's most valuable player and was named to the First All-Star Team.

In the 1945–46 season, Lach led all players with 34 regular season assists, and was named once more to the Second All-Star Team. The Canadiens won the Stanley Cup for the second time in Lach's career, defeating the Boston Bruins in five games.

In the 1947–48 season, Lach became the first recipient of the Art Ross Trophy, after leading the league in points, with 61. The Punch line era ended when Blake retired due to injury at the end of the season. At the end of the 1948–49 season, Lach announced his retirement while recovering from a fractured jaw, but returned for the following season. Lach led the league in assists for the last time in the 1951–52 season, with 50.

In the 1952–53 season, Lach won his third and final Stanley Cup in a memorable finish. In the 1953 Stanley Cup Final against the Boston Bruins, Lach scored the cup-winning goal at 1:22 of overtime in the fifth game of the series. In the on-ice celebration immediately after the goal, Maurice Richard accidentally broke Lach's nose with his stick. In 1953–54, Lach was again held back by injuries and his place was taken by another great, Jean Béliveau, whom he tutored in faceoffs. When the playoffs began, Lach was no longer a full-time player, but he was inserted into the lineup in the 1954 Stanley Cup Final when Montreal fell behind in the series. Montreal extended the series to seven games but ultimately lost.

Lach received numerous injuries during his career. His nose was broken seven times; his jaw (later permanently wired) was broken three times, officially only twice as he did not tell Irvin of one fracture because he did not want to come out of a game; a fractured skull that at first was treated as a "slight concussion". In one incident Lach suffered two severed veins in his foot from the slash of a skate blade. He played on until a teammate saw the blood. According to Ted Reeve, curator of the Hockey Hall of Fame in the 1950s, any pictorial record of the 1940s NHL would have to include prints of Lach's X-rays. Lach was injured so many times that he was offered $17,000 (enough for a house at the time) by his health insurance company to retire from hockey.

Lach was known for his skills at passing and speed in skating. Beliveau spoke glowingly of Lach's passing ability in his biography. He was also known for his competitiveness and willingness to fight in the corners to get the puck. According to writer Trent Frayne, "To some, [Elmer Lach] is hockey’s greatest competitor; to others, ‘the nastiest so-and-so in the league‘, in a 1950 article in the Saturday Evening Post.

== Later life ==
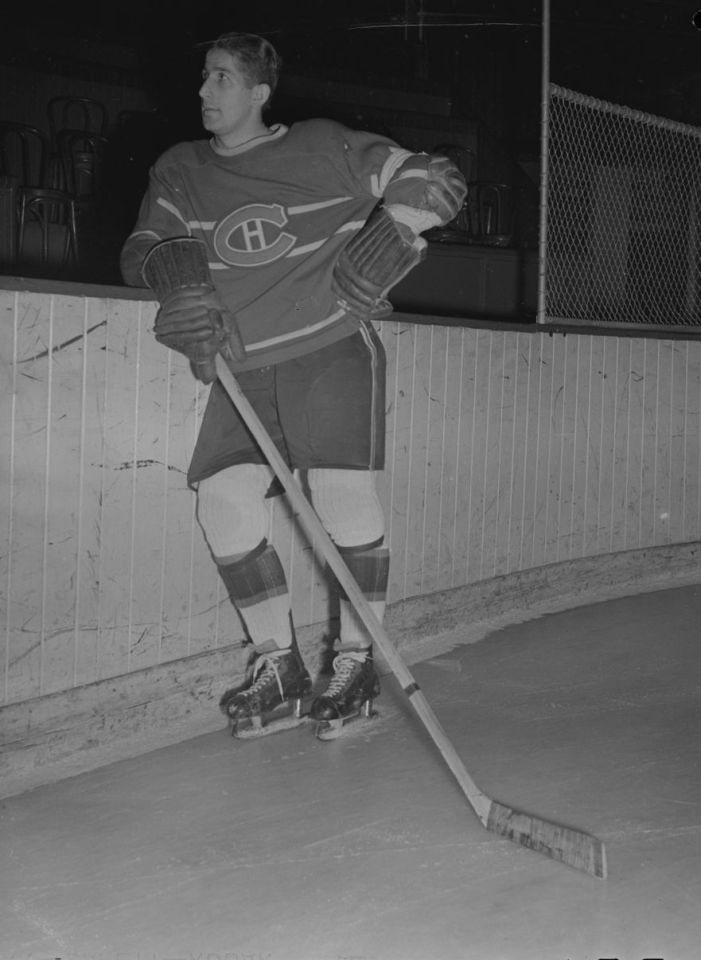
Lach in 1945

Lach retired after the 1953–54 NHL season as the league's all-time leading scorer, having played 664 regular season games, scoring 215 goals and 408 assists for 623 points, as well as 76 playoff games, in which he scored 19 goals and 45 assists for 64 points. He retired to accept an offer to coach the Montreal Junior Canadiens. He also coached the Montreal Royals for two seasons, before pursuing business interests. He worked for Maislin Transport for 30 years in sales and public relations, retiring in the 1980s.

He was elected into the Hockey Hall of Fame in 1966. In 1998, he was ranked number 68 on The Hockey News' list of the 100 Greatest Hockey Players. On December 4, 2009, coinciding with the Canadiens centennial celebration, his jersey number, 16, was retired a second time to honour Lach (along with Emile Bouchard's No. 3; No. 16 had been retired previously for Henri Richard).

Lach was married to Kay until she died in 1985. He married his second wife, Lise Desjardins, years later. The two lived together in Pointe Claire, Quebec. Lise Lach died October 13, 2014, at age 87 from leukemia.

Golf was a favourite pastime of Lach's. He played it into his 90s and for a while could match his age in his score. He met his second wife, Lise, while golfing. Part of his job entertaining clients with Maislin was taking them golfing. His son Ron was the manager of the Beaconsfield Golf Club.

On March 28, 2015, Lach suffered a stroke at a long-term care facility in Beaconsfield, Quebec, where he had moved after Lise's death. He never regained consciousness and on April 4, 2015, died at the West Island Palliative Care Residence in Kirkland, Quebec at the age of 97. He had been the oldest living former Canadiens player. Lach's final public appearance was at the funeral of Jean Béliveau on December 10, 2014.

== Career statistics ==
			Regular season					Playoffs
Season	Team	League	GP	G	A	Pts	PIM	GP	G	A	Pts	PIM
1935–36	Regina Abbotts	S-SJHL	2	0	1	1	2	4	3	0	3	6
1936–37	Weyburn Beavers	S-SSHL	23	16	6	22	27	3	0	1	1	4
1937–38	Weyburn Beavers	S-SSHL	23	12	12	24	44	3	2	1	3	0
1938–39	Moose Jaw Millers	S-SSHL	29	17	20	37	23	10	6	4	10	8
1939–40	Moose Jaw Millers	S-SSHL	30	15	29	44	20	8	5	9	14	12
1939–40	Moose Jaw Millers	AC	—	—	—	—	—	3	1	1	2	4
1940–41	Montreal Canadiens	NHL	43	7	14	21	16	3	1	0	1	0
1941–42	Montreal Canadiens	NHL	1	0	1	1	0	—	—	—	—	—
1942–43	Montreal Canadiens	NHL	45	18	40	58	14	5	2	4	6	6
1943–44	Montreal Canadiens	NHL	48	24	48	72	23	9	2	11	13	4
1944–45	Montreal Canadiens	NHL	50	26	54	80	37	6	4	4	8	2
1945–46	Montreal Canadiens	NHL	50	13	34	47	34	9	5	12	17	4
1946–47	Montreal Canadiens	NHL	31	14	16	30	22	—	—	—	—	—
1947–48	Montreal Canadiens	NHL	60	30	31	61	72	—	—	—	—	—
1948–49	Montreal Canadiens	NHL	36	11	18	29	59	1	0	0	0	4
1949–50	Montreal Canadiens	NHL	64	15	33	48	33	5	1	2	3	4
1950–51	Montreal Canadiens	NHL	65	21	24	45	48	11	2	2	4	2
1951–52	Montreal Canadiens	NHL	70	15	50	65	36	11	1	2	3	4
1952–53	Montreal Canadiens	NHL	53	16	25	41	56	12	1	6	7	6
1953–54	Montreal Canadiens	NHL	48	5	20	25	28	4	0	2	2	0
NHL totals			664	215	408	623	478	76	19	45	64	36

Sources: HHOF, SIHR.

== Awards ==
- Art Ross Trophy (1948; also led the league in scoring in 1945).
- Hart Trophy (1945)
- NHL First All-Star Team centre (1945, 1948, 1952)
- NHL Second All-Star Team centre (1944, 1946)
- Hockey Hall of Fame (1966)
- Saskatchewan Sports Hall of Fame (1967)
- In January 2017, Lach was part of the first group of players to be named one of the '100 Greatest NHL Players' in history.

Source: Hockey Hall of Fame, Saskatchewan Sports Hall of Fame.

Preceded by Max Bentley (NHL Scoring Champion)	Winner of the Art Ross Trophy; 1948	Succeeded by Roy Conacher
Preceded by Herb Cain	NHL Scoring Champion; 1945	Succeeded by Max Bentley
Preceded by Babe Pratt	Winner of the Hart Trophy; 1945	Succeeded by Max Bentley
