= Calum MacKay =

Canadian ice hockey player

- Born: January 1, 1927 Toronto, Ontario, Canada
- Died: August 21, 2001 (aged 74)
- Height: 5 ft 10 in (178 cm)
- Weight: 178 lb (81 kg; 12 st 10 lb)
- Position: Left wing
- Shot: Left
- Played for: Detroit Red Wings; Montreal Canadiens
- Playing career: 1946–1956

Calum "Baldy" MacKay (January 1, 1927 — August 21, 2001) was a Canadian professional ice hockey winger. He played in the National Hockey League with the Detroit Red Wings and Montreal Canadiens between 1947 and 1955. With Montreal, he won the Stanley Cup in 1953. MacKay was born in Toronto, Ontario, but grew up in Port Arthur, Ontario.

== Career ==
MacKay started his professional career by playing five games for the Detroit Red Wings in 1947. The next season, he split his time between the Omaha Knights of the United States Hockey League and the Indianapolis Capitals of the American Hockey League. In 1949, He was called up to Detroit for one game before being sent back to Indianapolis. In 1950, he joined the Montreal Canadiens where he played three years before being sent to the Buffalo Bisons for most of 1952 and all of 1953. He re-joined the Montreal Canadiens for the 1953 playoffs where he helped the Canadiens win the Stanley Cup defeating the Boston Bruins in the 1953 Stanley Cup Final. He played two more seasons for the Canadiens before he suffered a knee injury during training camp on September 30, 1955.

== Career statistics ==
=== Regular season and playoffs ===
			Regular season					Playoffs
Season	Team	League	GP	G	A	Pts	PIM	GP	G	A	Pts	PIM
1943–44	Port Arthur Bruins	TBJHL	10	5	12	17	7	4	4	0	4	4
1943–44	Port Arthur Flyers	TBJHL	—	—	—	—	—	2	2	0	2	0
1943–44	Port Arthur Flyers	M-Cup	—	—	—	—	—	9	6	2	8	2
1944–45	Port Arthur Bruins	TBJHL	10	12	15	27	24	8	3	7	10	6
1944–45	Port Arthur Bruins	M-Cup	—	—	—	—	—	10	5	5	10	10
1945–46	Port Arthur Bruins	TBJHL	3	3	4	7	9	6	9	5	14	6
1946–47	Oshawa Generals	OHA	27	16	22	38	54	5	1	0	1	25
1946–47	Detroit Red Wings	NHL	5	0	0	0	0	—	—	—	—	—
1947–48	Omaha Knights	USHL	25	9	10	19	22	—	—	—	—	—
1947–48	Indianapolis Capitals	AHL	36	18	16	34	18	—	—	—	—	—
1948–49	Detroit Red Wings	NHL	1	0	0	0	0	—	—	—	—	—
1948–49	Indianapolis Capitals	AHL	65	26	48	74	34	2	0	0	0	0
1949–50	Indianapolis Capitals	AHL	14	6	5	11	16	—	—	—	—	—
1949–50	Montreal Canadiens	NHL	52	8	10	18	44	5	0	1	1	2
1950–51	Montreal Canadiens	NHL	70	18	10	28	69	11	1	0	1	0
1951–52	Montreal Canadiens	NHL	12	0	1	1	8	—	—	—	—	—
1951–52	Buffalo Bisons	AHL	47	20	21	41	45	3	1	0	1	0
1952–53	Buffalo Bisons	AHL	64	28	42	70	65	—	—	—	—	—
1952–53	Montreal Canadiens	NHL	—	—	—	—	—	7	1	3	4	10
1953–54	Montreal Canadiens	NHL	47	10	13	23	54	3	0	1	1	0
1954–55	Montreal Canadiens	NHL	50	14	21	35	39	12	3	8	11	8
1955–56	Montreal Royals	QSHL	32	13	17	30	56	13	3	2	5	4
NHL totals			237	50	55	105	214	38	5	13	18	20

== Awards ==
- 1953 NHL All Star (Montreal)
