= Paul Meger =

Canadian ice hockey player (1929–2019)

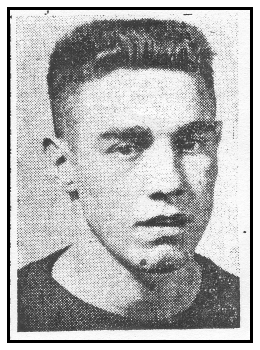
- Born: February 17, 1929 Watrous, Saskatchewan, Canada
- Died: August 27, 2019 (aged 90) Barrie, Ontario, Canada
- Height: 5 ft 7 in (170 cm)
- Weight: 160 lb (73 kg; 11 st 6 lb)
- Position: Left Wing
- Shot: Left
- Played for: Montreal Canadiens
- Playing career: 1946–1955

Paul Carl Meger (February 17, 1929 – August 27, 2019) was a Canadian professional ice hockey forward. Meger played his entire National Hockey League (NHL) career with the Montreal Canadiens, winning the Stanley Cup in 1953. His career lasted from 1949 until 1955. Meger was born in Watrous, Saskatchewan, but grew up in Selkirk, Manitoba.

== Career statistics ==
=== Regular season and playoffs ===
			Regular season					Playoffs
Season	Team	League	GP	G	A	Pts	PIM	GP	G	A	Pts	PIM
1945–46	Selkirk Fishermen	WSrHL	—	—	—	—	—	—	—	—	—	—
1946–47	Barrie Flyers	OHA	31	13	14	27	20	5	3	2	5	9
1947–48	Barrie Flyers	OHA	36	30	30	60	28	12	9	9	18	11
1947–48	Barrie Flyers	M-Cup	—	—	—	—	—	10	5	12	17	9
1948–49	Barrie Flyers	OHA	40	33	42	75	79	8	5	4	9	2
1948–59	Barrie Flyers	M-Cup	—	—	—	—	—	8	3	4	7	6
1949–50	Buffalo Bisons	AHL	63	26	40	66	33	5	1	2	3	0
1949–50	Montreal Canadiens	NHL	—	—	—	—	—	2	0	0	0	2
1950–51	Montreal Canadiens	NHL	17	2	4	6	6	11	1	3	4	4
1950–51	Buffalo Bisons	AHL	46	34	35	69	16	—	—	—	—	—
1951–52	Montreal Canadiens	NHL	69	24	18	42	44	11	0	3	3	2
1952–53	Montreal Canadiens	NHL	69	9	17	26	38	5	1	2	3	4
1953–54	Montreal Canadiens	NHL	44	4	9	13	24	6	1	0	1	4
1953–54	Montreal Royals	QSHL	23	13	17	30	28	—	—	—	—	—
1954–55	Montreal Canadiens	NHL	13	0	4	4	6	—	—	—	—	—
NHL totals			212	39	52	91	116	35	3	8	11	16
