= Dollard St. Laurent =

Canadian ice hockey player

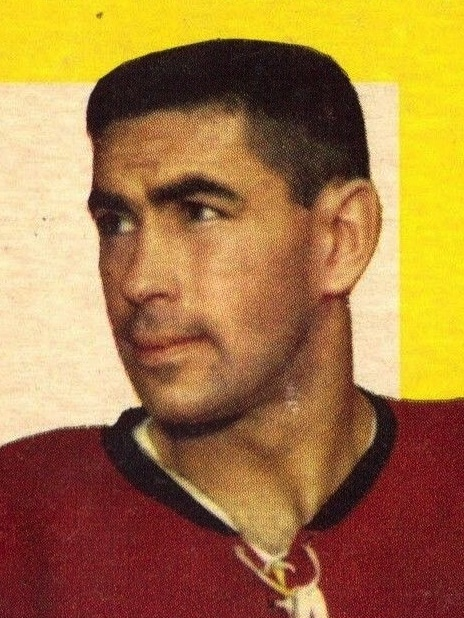
- Born: May 12, 1929 Verdun, Quebec, Canada
- Died: April 6, 2015 (aged 85) Beloeil, Quebec, Canada
- Height: 5 ft 11 in (180 cm)
- Weight: 180 lb (82 kg; 12 st 12 lb)
- Position: Defence
- Shot: Left
- Played for: Montreal Canadiens; Chicago Black Hawks
- Playing career: 1949–1963

Joseph Dollard Herve St. Laurent (May 12, 1929 – April 6, 2015) was a Canadian ice hockey defenceman.

== Pro career ==
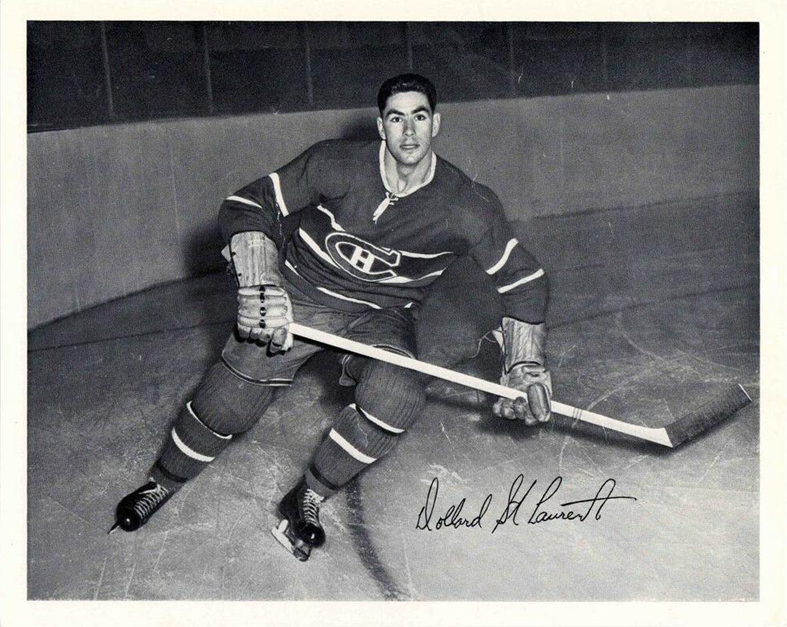
1950s Quaker Oats card of St. Laurent

Dollard started his National Hockey League career with the Montreal Canadiens in 1951. He would spend eight years in Montreal before being traded to the Chicago Black Hawks. He won four Stanley Cups with Montreal and one with Chicago.

He started out with the Jr. Canadiens of the QJHL, where he skated for two seasons from 1947 to 1949. There, he demonstrated an offensive touch and an ability to play a tough game of defence at the other end of the ice. In 1949–50, St. Laurent started a three-year relationship with the Royal Montreal Hockey Club of the QSHL. He spent most of his time sharpening the finer points of his game while putting them to the occasional test by joining the Habs for a couple of stints.

Around 1952–53, however, the Canadiens began to introduce significant new blood in the form of Jacques Plante and Dickie Moore among others. Dollard helped Montreal win the Stanley Cup in 1953. One of the others included St. Laurent, who settled onto the Habs' blueline corps as a stay-at-home regular for the next six seasons. His efforts contributed to three straight Stanley Cup victories in 1956, 1957, and 1958.

After the third championship, St. Laurent was sold to the Chicago Black Hawks, who were gradually assembling a lineup bent on bringing the Cup to town after a lengthy absence. In 1960–61, the team finally ended the championship drought by ousting the Red Wings in the finals.

St. Laurent played for the Hawks until the end of the 1961–62 campaign. The following year, he was dispatched to the Quebec Aces of the AHL, during which St. Laurent took a hard fall to the ice, breaking his leg and ending his aspirations to make it back to the NHL. At the end of the season, he announced his retirement.

On May 17, 1952, he was married to Jessie FitzPatrick (1929-1993).

St. Laurent died on April 6, 2015, aged 85.

== Career statistics ==
			Regular season					Playoffs
Season	Team	League	GP	G	A	Pts	PIM	GP	G	A	Pts	PIM
1947–48	Montreal Jr. Canadiens	QJHL	15	3	10	13	12	—	—	—	—	—
1948–49	Montreal Jr. Canadiens	QJHL	44	15	27	42	77	4	0	4	4	8
1949–50	Montreal Royals	QSHL	45	7	15	22	66	—	—	—	—	—
1950–51	Montreal Canadiens	NHL	3	0	0	0	0	—	—	—	—	—
1950–51	Montreal Royals	QMHL	57	12	30	42	69	7	3	2	5	14
1951–52	Montreal Canadiens	NHL	40	3	10	13	30	9	0	3	3	6
1951–52	Montreal Royals	QMHL	27	10	16	26	22	—	—	—	—	—
1952–53	Montreal Canadiens	NHL	54	2	6	8	34	12	0	3	3	4
1953–54	Montreal Canadiens	NHL	53	3	12	15	43	10	1	2	3	8
1954–55	Montreal Canadiens	NHL	58	3	14	17	24	12	0	5	5	12
1955–56	Montreal Canadiens	NHL	46	4	9	13	58	4	0	0	0	2
1956–57	Montreal Canadiens	NHL	64	1	11	12	49	7	0	1	1	13
1957–58	Montreal Canadiens	NHL	65	3	20	23	68	5	0	0	0	10
1958–59	Chicago Black Hawks	NHL	70	4	8	12	28	6	0	1	1	2
1959–60	Chicago Black Hawks	NHL	68	4	13	17	60	4	0	1	1	0
1960–61	Chicago Black Hawks	NHL	67	2	17	19	58	11	1	2	3	12
1961–62	Chicago Black Hawks	NHL	64	0	13	13	44	12	0	4	4	18
1962–63	Québec Aces	AHL	54	3	14	17	34	—	—	—	—	—
NHL totals			652	29	133	162	496	92	2	22	24	87
