= Dickie Moore (ice hockey) =

Canadian hockey player (1931–2015)

- Hockey Hall of Fame, 1974
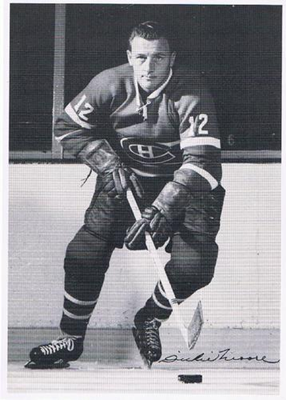
- Moore with the Montreal Canadiens in 1960
- Born: January 6, 1931 Montreal, Quebec, Canada
- Died: December 19, 2015 (aged 84) Montreal, Quebec, Canada
- Height: 5 ft 10 in (178 cm)
- Weight: 185 lb (84 kg; 13 st 3 lb)
- Position: Winger
- Shot: Left
- Played for: Montreal Canadiens; Toronto Maple Leafs; St. Louis Blues
- Playing career: 1951–1963: 1964–1965; 1967–1968

Richard Winston Moore (January 6, 1931 – December 19, 2015) was a Canadian professional hockey player, businessman and community philanthropist. He won the Art Ross Trophy twice as the National Hockey League's leading scorer and was inducted into the Hockey Hall of Fame. Moore spent most of his career with the Montreal Canadiens and came out of retirement twice to play briefly with the Toronto Maple Leafs and St. Louis Blues. In 2017 he was named one of the '100 Greatest NHL Players' in history.

== Career ==
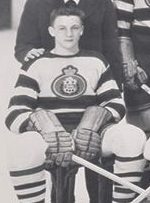
Moore with the Montreal Jr. Royals in 1948

Moore played with the Montreal Jr. Royals from 1947 to 1950. He played on two Memorial Cup winning teams, one with the Montreal Royals in 1949 and the Montreal Junior Canadiens the following year. In the late 1940s Frank Selke Sr., the general manager of the Montreal Canadiens, called him Canada's best junior. Moore made his NHL debut with the Canadiens in the middle of the 1951–52 season.

Moore was known for his hard accurate shot and his stickhandling. He twice won the Art Ross Trophy as the league's leading scorer. In 1958-59 he scored 41 goals and 55 assists for 96 points, breaking Gordie Howe's record of 95 total points in a regular season. He often played on a line with Henri Richard and Maurice Richard.

Moore won the Stanley Cup with the Canadiens for the first time in 1953 and five more times in a row from 1956 to 1960.

In 1957–58 Moore suffered a broken wrist in a collision with Detroit defenceman Marcel Pronovost which threatened to cut short a scoring championship year. Journalist Red Fisher described what happened next:

Moore, the competitor, wanted to win the Art Ross. He had his eye on the prize, but Moore, the team man, had other ideas. One night, when the Canadiens were travelling on the train, he asked for a meeting with coach Toe Blake and his linemates, Maurice and Henri Richard. At the time, Henri was Dickie's closest pursuer in the scoring race. Dickie told them he could still play with his wrist in a cast, but for how long? And as long as he played with an injury that would sideline most players, how much could he contribute to the line? "It’s not fair to Henri," Moore told Blake. "It’s not fair not to allow him to win the scoring title." The meeting lasted no more than a few minutes. It ended abruptly when Maurice and Henri told Blake: "There’s no damned way he’s going off the line." Moore remained on the line. He played with his wrist imprisoned in a cast for the second half of the season. He won the Art Ross with an NHL-leading 36 goals and 48 assists in a 70-game season. Henri finished four points behind. Moore won it again in 1958–59 with 41 goals and 55 assists.

He retired following the 1962–63 season, but came back a year later to play one season for the Toronto Maple Leafs. Three years later, in 1967–68, Moore came out of retirement once more to play 45 games for the St. Louis Blues. At 37 years of age, he scored 14 points in the playoffs as the Blues made it to the Stanley Cup Final in their first season.

In 1974, Moore was inducted into the Hockey Hall of Fame. In 1998, he was ranked number 31 on The Hockey News' list of the 100 Greatest Hockey Players.

== Later life ==
Following his retirement from hockey, Moore operated a successful equipment and tools rental business for construction in Montreal, Ottawa and Toronto.

On November 12, 2005, the Canadiens retired the uniform number 12 in honour of both Moore and Yvan Cournoyer.

On August 27, 2006, Moore suffered neck, spine, and rib injuries when his car was hit by a truck in Montreal. He was trapped in the car for 45 minutes.

He died on December 19, 2015, in Montreal at the age of 84.

== Personal ==
Moore had three children: Richard, Lianne and John. In 1973, Richard died at the age of 16 in a car accident. He had been attending Malcolm Campbell High School in Montreal. The Dickie Moore Memorial Awards are presented annually in memory of former Kentville Minor Hockey player Dickie Moore Jr.

== Awards and records ==
- NHL first team All-Star — 1958, 1959
- NHL second team All-Star — 1961
- Played in NHL All-Star Game 6 times
- Art Ross Trophy — 1958, 1959
- Stanley Cup Champions — 1953, 1956, 1957, 1958, 1959, 1960 (6)
- Inducted into Hockey Hall of Fame in 1974
- Most regular season points in one NHL season - 96 (1959, surpassed by Bobby Hull in 1966 (97 points), current record held by Wayne Gretzky who scored 215 points in 1986)
- In January, 2017, Moore was part of the first group of players to be named one of the '100 Greatest NHL Players' in history.

== Career statistics ==
Bolded indicates league leader

| | | | Regular season | | | | | Playoffs |
| Season | Team | League | GP | G | A | Pts | PIM | GP | G | A | Pts | PIM |
|---|---|---|---|---|---|---|---|---|---|---|---|---|
| 1947–48 | Montreal Jr. Royals | QJHL | 29 | 10 | 11 | 21 | 20 | 13 | 6 | 5 | 11 | 14 |
| 1948–49 | Montreal Jr. Royals | QJHL | 47 | 22 | 34 | 56 | 71 | 10 | 4 | 8 | 12 | 6 |
| 1948–49 | Montreal Royals | QSHL | 2 | 0 | 0 | 0 | 0 | — | — | — | — | — |
| 1948–49 | Montreal Jr. Royals | M-Cup | — | — | — | — | — | 15 | 8 | 5 | 13 | 31 |
| 1949–50 | Montreal Jr. Royals | QJHL | 1 | 0 | 1 | 1 | 5 | — | — | — | — | — |
| 1949–50 | Montreal Jr. Canadiens | QJHL | 35 | 24 | 19 | 43 | 110 | 16 | 8 | 13 | 21 | 51 |
| 1949–50 | Montreal Jr. Canadiens | M-Cup | — | — | — | — | — | 13 | 10 | 14 | 24 | 41 |
| 1950–51 | Montreal Jr. Canadiens | QJHL | 33 | 12 | 22 | 34 | 58 | 9 | 5 | 4 | 9 | 34 |
| 1951–52 | Montreal Canadiens | NHL | 33 | 18 | 15 | 33 | 44 | 11 | 1 | 1 | 2 | 12 |
| 1951–52 | Montreal Royals | QMHL | 26 | 15 | 20 | 35 | 32 | — | — | — | — | — |
| 1952–53 | Montreal Canadiens | NHL | 18 | 2 | 6 | 8 | 19 | 12 | 3 | 2 | 5 | 13 |
| 1952–53 | Buffalo Bisons | AHL | 6 | 2 | 3 | 5 | 10 | — | — | — | — | — |
| 1953–54 | Montreal Canadiens | NHL | 13 | 1 | 4 | 5 | 12 | 11 | 5 | 8 | 13 | 8 |
| 1953–54 | Montreal Royals | QHL | 2 | 0 | 1 | 1 | 4 | — | — | — | — | — |
| 1954–55 | Montreal Canadiens | NHL | 67 | 16 | 20 | 36 | 32 | 12 | 1 | 5 | 6 | 22 |
| 1955–56 | Montreal Canadiens | NHL | 70 | 11 | 39 | 50 | 55 | 10 | 3 | 6 | 9 | 12 |
| 1956–57 | Montreal Canadiens | NHL | 70 | 29 | 29 | 58 | 56 | 10 | 3 | 7 | 10 | 4 |
| 1957–58 | Montreal Canadiens | NHL | 70 | **36** | 48 | **84** | 65 | 10 | 4 | 7 | 11 | 4 |
| 1958–59 | Montreal Canadiens | NHL | 70 | 41 | **55** | **96** | 61 | 11 | 5 | 12 | 17 | 8 |
| 1959–60 | Montreal Canadiens | NHL | 62 | 22 | 42 | 64 | 54 | 8 | 6 | 4 | 10 | 4 |
| 1960–61 | Montreal Canadiens | NHL | 57 | 35 | 34 | 69 | 62 | 6 | 3 | 1 | 4 | 4 |
| 1961–62 | Montreal Canadiens | NHL | 57 | 19 | 22 | 41 | 54 | 6 | 4 | 2 | 6 | 8 |
| 1962–63 | Montreal Canadiens | NHL | 67 | 24 | 26 | 50 | 61 | 5 | 0 | 1 | 1 | 2 |
| 1964–65 | Toronto Maple Leafs | NHL | 38 | 2 | 4 | 6 | 68 | 5 | 1 | 1 | 2 | 6 |
| 1967–68 | St. Louis Blues | NHL | 27 | 5 | 3 | 8 | 9 | 18 | 7 | 7 | 14 | 15 |
| NHL totals | | | 719 | 261 | 347 | 608 | 652 | 135 | 46 | 64 | 110 | 122 |

| Preceded by Gordie Howe | Winner of the Art Ross Trophy; 1958, 1959 | Succeeded by Bobby Hull |
