= NHL on television in the 1950s =

Hockey Night in Canada began airing on Saturday nights on CBC Television in 1952. National coverage of the NHL in the U.S. was limited to Saturday afternoon regular season games on CBS, running for four seasons from 1956–57 to 1959–60.

== Year-by-year breakdown ==
=== 1953 ===
In the 1952–53 season, CBC began televising Hockey Night in Canada as a simulcast to the radio calls, joining the games in progress either 30 minutes or 60 minutes after the opening faceoff. Until 1961, the CBC was the only operating television network in Canada. Not only that, it was likely that not all Toronto Maple Leafs and Montreal Canadiens playoff games were televised in the early years, including to their local markets.

=== 1954 ===
CBC's coverage of Games 3, 4 and 5 of the 1954 Stanley Cup Finals were joined in progress at 9:30 p.m. (approximately one hour after start time). Meanwhile, CBC joined Game 6 in at 10 p.m. (again, one hour after start time). Game 7 was carried Dominion wide (nationwide) from the opening face-off at 9 p.m. Since Game 7 was played on Good Friday night, there were no commercials (Imperial Oil was the sponsor).

=== 1955 ===
Game 3 of the Detroit-Toronto playoff series and Game 5 of the Boston-Montreal series were televised nationally.

=== 1956 ===
Game 4 of the Montreal-New York Rangers playoff series was not the potential clincher, nor was it played in Montreal. Therefore, there was a possible chance that the game wasn't going to be televised.

=== 1957 ===
CBS first broadcast National Hockey League games on Saturday afternoons for four seasons from 1956–57 to 1959–60. Bud Palmer served as the play-by-play announcer, and Fred Cusick provided color commentary, pregame, and intermission interviews for the first three seasons. In 1959–60, Cusick moved over to play-by-play while Brian McFarlane came in to do color commentary, pregame, and intermission interviews. The pregame and intermission interviews were done on the ice, with the interviewer on skates. No playoff games were televised during this period, and all broadcasts took place in one of the four American arenas at the time.

As previously mentioned, CBS covered the 1956–57 season on Saturday afternoons, starting on January 5. For the next three years, CBS continued airing games on Saturday afternoons starting on November 2, 1957, October 18, 1958, and January 9, 1960.

Games 1, 2, and 4 of the Montreal-New York Rangers playoff series were not likely seen outside the Montreal region if not televised at all.

=== 1958 ===
Games 1–3 of the Montreal-Detroit playoff series were likely not seen outside Quebec.

=== 1959 ===
CBC's telecast of Game 7 of Toronto-Boston playoff series at Boston Garden joins just before the start of the second period. Bill Hewitt and Foster Hewitt were simulcasting on Toronto's CKFH and CBC Radio, and one of them welcomes the television audience.

== See also ==
- National Hockey League on television
- List of Canadian Stanley Cup Final television announcers
- List of American Stanley Cup Final television announcers
- List of Hockey Night in Canada commentators
- List of NHL All-Star Game broadcasters
