= List of NHL longest winning streaks =

This is a list of the longest winning streaks in National Hockey League (NHL) history. The list includes streaks that started at the end of one season and carried over into the following season. There are two lists, streaks that consist entirely of regular-season games and streaks made up of playoff games only. The 1992–93 Pittsburgh Penguins hold the record for longest win streak at 17. The Penguins also hold the record for 14 straight playoff game wins, beginning in the 1992 and ending in the 1993 playoffs. Only regular season winning streaks lasting twelve or more games are included.

The Montreal Canadiens appear six times across both lists, with four streaks over 11 games in the postseason and two streaks over 12 games or more in the regular season. The Boston Bruins appear four times across both lists, with three of those streaks over 10 games occurring in the regular season.

The longest undefeated streak (ties included) in NHL history belonged to the 1979–80 Philadelphia Flyers, who went unbeaten for 35 consecutive games. They also own the record for the most consecutive games with at least one point.

Beginning with the 2005–06 season, tie games were abolished in favor of a shootout.

== Key ==
Italic score	Denotes streak ended with a tie
^	Denotes streaks that spanned at least two seasons
	Denotes streaks that are currently in progress
*	Denotes season in which team won Stanley Cup

== Winning streaks ==
=== Regular season ===
This list contains only the top streaks consisting entirely of regular-season games.

Rank	Games	Team	Season(s)	Season record(s)	Date	Score	Opponent	Date	Score	Opponent
Rank	Games	Team	Season(s)	Season record(s)	Beginning (first victory)			End (first defeat or tie)		
1	17	Pittsburgh Penguins	1992–93	51–21–7	March 9, 1993	3–2	Boston Bruins	April 14, 1993	6–6 (OT)	New Jersey Devils
2 (tie)	16	Columbus Blue Jackets	2016–17	50–24–8	November 29, 2016	5–1	Tampa Bay Lightning	January 5, 2017	0–5	Washington Capitals
2 (tie)	16	Edmonton Oilers	2023–24	49–27–6	December 21, 2023	6–3	New Jersey Devils	February 6, 2024	1–3	Vegas Golden Knights
2 (tie)	16 (8 + 8)	Winnipeg Jets	2023–24^ 2024–25^	52-24-6; 56-22-4	April 1, 2024	4–3	Los Angeles Kings	October 28, 2024	4–6	Toronto Maple Leafs
5 (tie)	15	New York Islanders	1981–82*	54–16–10	January 20, 1982	6–1	Pittsburgh Penguins	February 21, 1982	3–4	Pittsburgh Penguins
5 (tie)	15 (5 + 10)	Buffalo Sabres	2005–06^ 2006–07^	52–24–6; 53–22–7	April 8, 2006	6–2	Ottawa Senators	October 28, 2006	4–5 (SO)	Atlanta Thrashers
5 (tie)	15	Pittsburgh Penguins	2012–13	36–12–0 (Note: Season shortened by the 2012–13 NHL lockout)	March 2, 2013	7–6 (OT)	Montreal Canadiens	April 2, 2013	1–4	Buffalo Sabres
8 (tie)	14	Boston Bruins	1929–30	38–5–1	December 3, 1929	3–1	Montreal Canadiens	January 12, 1930	2–3	New York Americans
8 (tie)	14	Washington Capitals	2009–10	54–15–13	January 13, 2010	5–4 (SO)	Florida Panthers	February 10, 2010	5–6 (OT)	Montreal Canadiens
8 (tie)	14 (6 + 8)	Florida Panthers	2020–21^ 2021–22^	37–14–5; 58–18–6	April 27, 2021	7–4	Nashville Predators	October 30, 2021	2–3 (SO)	Boston Bruins
8 (tie)	14 (8 + 6)	Boston Bruins	2022–23^ 2023–24^	65–12–5; 47–20–15	March 30, 2023	2–1 (OT)	Columbus Blue Jackets	October 26, 2023	3–4 (OT)	Anaheim Ducks
12 (tie)	13	Boston Bruins	1970–71	57–14–7	February 23, 1971	6–3	Buffalo Sabres	March 21, 1971	5–7	Buffalo Sabres
12 (tie)	13	Philadelphia Flyers	1985–86	53–23–4	October 19, 1985	7–3	Minnesota North Stars	November 19, 1985	6–8	New York Islanders
12 (tie)	13	New Jersey Devils	2000–01	48–19–12–3	February 26, 2001	5–3	Florida Panthers	March 25, 2001	2–4	Pittsburgh Penguins
12 (tie)	13	Florida Panthers	2021–22	58–18–6	March 29, 2022	7–4	Montreal Canadiens	April 24, 2022	4–8	Tampa Bay Lightning
12 (tie)	13	New Jersey Devils	2022–23	52–22–8	October 25, 2022	6–2	Detroit Red Wings	November 23, 2022	1–2	Toronto Maple Leafs

=== Postseason ===
This is a list of streaks recorded only in the playoffs.

Rank	Games	Team	Season(s)	Date	Score	Opponent	Date	Score	Opponent
Rank	Games	Team	Season(s)	Beginning (first victory)			End (first defeat)		
1	14 (11 + 3)	Pittsburgh Penguins	1991–92*^ 1992–93^	May 9, 1992	5–4 (OT)	New York Rangers	April 25, 1993	1–4	New Jersey Devils
2	12 (3 + 9)	Edmonton Oilers	1983–84*^ 1984–85*^	May 15, 1984	7–2	New York Islanders	May 9, 1985	2–5	Chicago Black Hawks
3 (tie)	11 (2 + 8 + 1)	Montreal Canadiens	1958–59*^ 1959–60*^ 1960–61^	April 16, 1959	3–2	Toronto Maple Leafs	March 23, 1961	3–4	Chicago Black Hawks
3 (tie)	11 (5 + 6)	Montreal Canadiens	1967–68*^ 1968–69*^	April 28, 1968	4–3 (OT)	Chicago Black Hawks	April 17, 1969	0–5	Boston Bruins
3 (tie)	11 (10 + 1)	Boston Bruins	1969–70*^ 1970–71^	April 14, 1970	3–2	New York Rangers	April 8, 1971	5–7	Montreal Canadiens
3 (tie)	11 (5 + 6)	Montreal Canadiens	1975–76*^ 1976–77*^	May 6, 1976	5–2	New York Islanders	April 28, 1977	3–5	New York Islanders
3 (tie)	11	Chicago Blackhawks	1991–92	April 24, 1992	5–3	St. Louis Blues	May 26, 1992	4–5	Pittsburgh Penguins
3 (tie)	11	Montreal Canadiens	1992–93*	April 22, 1993	2–1 (OT)	Quebec Nordiques	May 22, 1993	1–4	New York Islanders
3 (tie)	11 (5 + 6)	Detroit Red Wings	1997–98*^ 1998–99^	June 5, 1998	2–0	Dallas Stars	May 11, 1999	3–5	Colorado Avalanche
10	10 (9 + 1)	New York Islanders	1981–82*^ 1982–83*^	April 23, 1982	5–3	New York Rangers	April 7, 1983	2–4	Washington Capitals

=== Regular season and postseason ===
This is a list of streaks that included regular season games and at least one postseason game.

Rank	Games	Team	Season	Season record Playoff finish	Date	Score	Opponent	Date	Score	Opponent
Rank	Games	Team	Season	Season record Playoff finish	Beginning (first victory)			End (first defeat)		
1 (tie)	15	Detroit Red Wings	1954–55*	42–17–11; Won Stanley Cup	February 27, 1955	3–2	Chicago Black Hawks	April 7, 1955	2–4	Montreal Canadiens
1 (tie)	15	New Jersey Devils	2005–06	46–27–9; Lost Eastern Conference Semifinals	March 28, 2006	3–2 (SO)	Ottawa Senators	May 6, 2006	0–6	Carolina Hurricanes
3	13	Montreal Canadiens	1986–87	41–29–10; Lost Wales Conference Finals	March 16, 1987	3–0	New York Islanders	April 20, 1987	5–7	Quebec Nordiques
4 (tie)	11	Boston Bruins	1938–39*	36–10–2; Won Stanley Cup	February 26, 1939	5–1	Chicago Black Hawks	March 28, 1939	1–2	New York Rangers
4 (tie)	11	Montreal Canadiens	1966–67	32–25–13; Lost Stanley Cup Finals	March 22, 1967	5–3	Toronto Maple Leafs	April 22, 1967	0–3	Toronto Maple Leafs
4 (tie)	11	Philadelphia Flyers	1984–85	53–20–7; Lost Stanley Cup Finals	March 28, 1985	3–1	Detroit Red Wings	April 25, 1985	2–6	New York Islanders
4 (tie)	11	Colorado Avalanche	1999–2000	42–28–11–1; Lost Western Conference Finals	March 23, 2000	4–2	Phoenix Coyotes	April 19, 2000	2–3	Phoenix Coyotes
8 (tie)	10	St. Louis Blues	1968–69	37–25–14; Lost Stanley Cup Finals	March 26, 1969	5–3	Oakland Seals	April 27, 1969	1–3	Montreal Canadiens
8 (tie)	10	Montreal Canadiens	1975–76*	58–11–11; Won Stanley Cup	March 31, 1976	7–3	Pittsburgh Penguins	May 4, 1976	2–5	New York Islanders

== Undefeated streaks ==
This list includes teams who had the longest undefeated streaks in NHL history. The streaks include ties.

=== Regular season ===
Rank	Games	Team	Season(s)	Season record(s)	Date	Score	Opponent	Date	Score	Opponent	Notes
Rank	Games	Team	Season(s)	Season record(s)	Beginning (first victory or tie)			End (first defeat)			Notes
1	35	Philadelphia Flyers	1979–80	48–12–20	October 14, 1979	4–3	Toronto Maple Leafs	January 7, 1980	1–7	Minnesota North Stars	Streak included 25 wins and ten ties.
2	28	Montreal Canadiens	1977–78*	59–10–11	December 18, 1977	2–0	Philadelphia Flyers	February 25, 1978	3–6	New York Rangers	Streak included 23 wins and five ties.
3 (tie)	23	Boston Bruins	1940–41*	27–8–13	December 22, 1940	5–3	Detroit Red Wings	February 25, 1941	0–2	New York Rangers	Streak included 15 wins and eight ties.
3 (tie)	23	Philadelphia Flyers	1975–76	51–13–16	January 29, 1976	1–1	Buffalo Sabres	March 20, 1976	2–4	Detroit Red Wings	Streak included 17 wins and six ties.
5 (tie)	21	Montreal Canadiens	1974–75	47–14–19	November 27, 1974	3–2	Pittsburgh Penguins	January 18, 1975	3–5	Toronto Maple Leafs	Streak included 15 wins and six ties.
5 (tie)	21	Montreal Canadiens	1976–77*	60–8–12	January 18, 1977	3–0	Washington Capitals	March 6, 1977	1–4	Buffalo Sabres	Streak included 17 wins and four ties.
5 (tie)	21	Montreal Canadiens	1979–80	47–20–13	February 21, 1980	3–0	Winnipeg Jets	October 11, 1980	4–5	Chicago Black Hawks	Streak included 15 wins and six ties. Undefeated streak was broken in the first game of the 1980–81 season.
8	20	Philadelphia Flyers	1976–77	48–16–16	November 16, 1976	2–0	Detroit Red Wings	January 3, 1977	4–6	Montreal Canadiens	Streak included 15 wins and five ties.
9	19	New York Rangers	1939–40*	27–11–10	November 23, 1939	1–1	Montreal Canadiens	January 14, 1940	1–2	Chicago Black Hawks	Streak included 14 wins and five ties.
10 (tie)	18	Montreal Canadiens	1927–28	26–11–7	November 30, 1927	5–2	Chicago Black Hawks	January 21, 1928	0–1	Montreal Maroons	Streak included 15 wins and three ties.
10 (tie)	18	Montreal Canadiens	1944–45	38–8–4	January 6, 1945	10–1	Chicago Black Hawks	March 3, 1945	2–3	Toronto Maple Leafs	Streak included 16 wins and two ties.
10 (tie)	18	Montreal Canadiens	1959–60*	40–18–12	October 18, 1959	6–5	New York Rangers	December 2, 1959	0–1	Toronto Maple Leafs	Streak included 15 wins and three ties.
10 (tie)	18	Boston Bruins	1968–69	42–18–16	December 28, 1968	6–2	St. Louis Blues	February 6, 1969	1–3	St. Louis Blues	Streak included 13 wins and five ties.
10 (tie)	18	Pittsburgh Penguins	1992–93	56–21–7	March 9, 1993	3–2	Boston Bruins	October 5, 1993	3–4	Philadelphia Flyers	Streak included 17 wins and one tie. Undefeated streak was broken in the first game of the 1993–94 season.

=== Regular season and postseason ===
Rank	Games	Team	Season	Season record Playoff finish	Date	Score	Opponent	Date	Score	Opponent	Notes
Rank	Games	Team	Season	Season record Playoff finish	Beginning (first victory or tie)			End (first defeat)			Notes
1	24	Montreal Canadiens	1979–80	47–20–13; Lost Stanley Cup Quarterfinals	February 21, 1980	3–0	Winnipeg Jets	April 16, 1980	0–3	Minnesota North Stars	Streak included 18 wins and six ties.
2 (tie)	21	Philadelphia Flyers	1974–75*	51–18–11; Won Stanley Cup	March 9, 1975	8–5	Detroit Red Wings	May 7, 1975	3–4 (OT)	New York Islanders	Streak included 19 wins and two ties.
2 (tie)	21	Pittsburgh Penguins	1992–93	56–21–7; Lost Patrick Division Finals	March 9, 1993	3–2	Boston Bruins	April 25, 1993	1–4	New Jersey Devils	Streak included 20 wins and one tie.
4 (tie)	18	Detroit Red Wings	1954–55*	42–17–11; Won Stanley Cup	February 20, 1955	5–0	New York Rangers	April 7, 1955	2–4	Montreal Canadiens	Streak included 16 wins and two ties.
4 (tie)	18	Montreal Canadiens	1976–77*	60–8–12; Won Stanley Cup	March 9, 1977	2–2	Toronto Maple Leafs	April 28, 1977	3–5	New York Islanders	Streak included 16 wins and two ties.
6 (tie)	16	Montreal Canadiens	1966–67	32–25–13; Lost Stanley Cup Finals	March 11, 1967	3–3	Chicago Black Hawks	April 22, 1967	0–3	Toronto Maple Leafs	Streak included 13 wins and three ties.
6 (tie)	16	Chicago Black Hawks	1971–72	46–17–15; Lost Stanley Cup Semifinals	March 8, 1972	3–3	New York Rangers	April 16, 1972	2–3	New York Rangers	Streak included 10 wins and six ties.
6 (tie)	16	Buffalo Sabres	1979–80	47–17–16; Lost Stanley Cup Semifinals	March 6, 1980	4–3	Hartford Whalers	April 11, 1980	4–5	Vancouver Canucks	Streak included 10 wins and six ties.
9 (tie)	15	Winnipeg Jets	1984–85	43–27–10; Lost Smythe Division Finals	March 8, 1985	6–3	Quebec Nordiques	April 13, 1985	0–4	Calgary Flames	Streak included 12 wins and three ties.
9 (tie)	15	New Jersey Devils	2005–06	46–27–9; Lost Eastern Conference Semifinals	March 28, 2006	3–2 (SO)	Ottawa Senators	May 6, 2006	0–6	Carolina Hurricanes	Also tied for the longest combined regular season and postseason winning streak.

== Points streaks ==
This list includes teams who have recorded the most consecutive games with a win, a draw, an overtime loss as of the 1999–2000 season, or a shootout loss as of the 2005–06 season. NHL teams can earn two points with a win, and one point with a full regulation-time tie.

Rank	Games	Team	Season(s)	Season record(s)	Date	Score	Opponent	Date	Score	Opponent	Notes
Rank	Games	Team	Season(s)	Season record(s)	Beginning (first victory, tie (1983–99, after OT; since 1999, at regulation if loss in OT/SO)			End (first regulation loss)			Notes
1	35	Philadelphia Flyers	1979–80	48–12–20	October 14, 1979	4–3	Toronto Maple Leafs	January 7, 1980	1–7	Minnesota North Stars	Streak included 25 wins and ten ties.
2	28	Montreal Canadiens	1977–78*	59–10–11	December 18, 1977	2–0	Philadelphia Flyers	February 25, 1978	3–6	New York Rangers	Streak included 23 wins and five ties.
3	24	Chicago Blackhawks	2012–13*	36–7–5	January 19, 2013	5–2	Los Angeles Kings	March 8, 2013	2–6	Colorado Avalanche	Streak included 21 wins and three regulation ties lost in OT/SO.
4 (tie)	23	Boston Bruins	1940–41*	27–8–13	December 22, 1940	5–3	Detroit Red Wings	February 25, 1941	0–2	New York Rangers	Streak included 15 wins and eight ties.
4 (tie)	23	Philadelphia Flyers	1975–76	51–13–16	January 29, 1976	1–1	Buffalo Sabres	March 20, 1976	2–4	Detroit Red Wings	Streak included 17 wins and six ties.
6 (tie)	21	Montreal Canadiens	1974–75	47–14–19	November 27, 1974	3–2	Pittsburgh Penguins	January 18, 1975	3–5	Toronto Maple Leafs	Streak included 15 wins and six ties.
6 (tie)	21	Montreal Canadiens	1976–77*	60–8–12	January 18, 1977	3–0	Washington Capitals	March 6, 1977	1–4	Buffalo Sabres	Streak included 17 wins and four ties.
6 (tie)	21	Montreal Canadiens	1979–80	47–20–13	February 21, 1980	3–0	Winnipeg Jets	October 11, 1980	4–5	Chicago Black Hawks	Streak included 15 wins and six ties. Point streak was broken in the first game of the 1980–81 season.
9 (tie)	20	Philadelphia Flyers	1976–77	48–16–16	November 16, 1976	2–0	Detroit Red Wings	January 3, 1977	4–6	Montreal Canadiens	Streak included 15 wins and five ties.
9 (tie)	20	Detroit Red Wings	2005–06	58–16–8	March 9, 2006	7–3	Los Angeles Kings	April 18, 2006	3–6	Nashville Predators	Streak included 17 wins and three OT/SO losses.
9 (tie)	20	San Jose Sharks	2007–08	49–23–10	February 21, 2008	3–1	Philadelphia Flyers	April 3, 2008	2–4	Los Angeles Kings	Streak included 18 wins and two OT/SO losses.

== See also ==
- List of NHL records (team)
- List of NHL longest losing streaks
