= List of winning streaks =

This list of winning streaks lists all articles containing lists of Winning streaks in sports.

- List of winning streaks in the Olympic Games
- List of NHL longest winning streaks
- Longest NCAA Division I football winning streaks
- List of NFL longest winning streaks
  - List of NFL franchise post-season streaks
- Basketball winning streaks
  - List of NBA longest winning streaks
  - List of high school boys basketball streaks by state
- List of longest PGA Tour win streaks
- List of winning streaks in baseball and softball
  - List of Major League Baseball longest winning streaks
  - List of Major League Baseball individual streaks
  - List of MLB franchise postseason streaks
- List of Canadian Football League records (team)#Streaks
