= Zeniuk =

Zeniuk is a surname. Notable people with the surname include:

- Ed Zeniuk (1933–1996), Canadian ice hockey defenceman
- Stefan Zeniuk (fl. early 21st century), American musician
