= 1954–55 Boston Bruins season =

NHL team season

1954–55 Boston Bruins
- League: 4th NHL
- 1954–55 record: 23–26–21
- Home record: 16–10–9
- Road record: 7–16–12
- Goals for: 169
- Goals against: 188

Team information
- General manager: Lynn Patrick
- Coach: Lynn Patrick; Milt Schmidt
- Captain: Milt Schmidt; Ed Sandford
- Arena: Boston Garden

Team leaders
- Goals: Leo Labine (24)
- Assists: Fleming Mackell (24)
- Points: Don McKenney and Leo Labine (42)
- Penalty minutes: Fernie Flaman (150)
- Wins: John Henderson (15)
- Goals against average: John Henderson (2.49)

The 1954–55 Boston Bruins season saw the Bruins finish in fourth place in the National Hockey League (NHL) with a record of 23 wins, 26 losses, and 21 ties for 67 points. In the playoffs, they lost the semi-finals to the Montreal Canadiens in five games.

== Regular season ==
=== Final standings ===
National Hockey League
		GP	W	L	T	GF	GA	DIFF	Pts
1	Detroit Red Wings	70	42	17	11	204	134	+70	95
2	Montreal Canadiens	70	41	18	11	228	157	+71	93
3	Toronto Maple Leafs	70	24	24	22	147	135	+12	70
4	Boston Bruins	70	23	26	21	169	188	−19	67
5	New York Rangers	70	17	35	18	150	210	−60	52
6	Chicago Black Hawks	70	13	40	17	161	235	−74	43

=== Record vs. opponents ===
1954–55 NHL Records
Team	BOS	CHI	DET	MTL	NYR	TOR
Boston	—	7–4–3	3–7–4	4–7–3	5–4–5	4–4–6
Chicago	4–7–3	—	1–12–1	0–11–3	5–4–5	3–6–5
Detroit	7–3–4	12–1–1	—	7–7	9–2–3	7–4–3
Montreal	7–4–3	11–0–3	7–7	—	10–3–1	6–4–4
New York	4–5–5	4–5–5	2–9–3	3–10–1	—	4–6–4
Toronto	4–4–6	6–3–5	4–7–3	4–6–4	6–4–4	—

== Schedule and results ==
1954–55 regular season
October

Game	Result	Date	Score	Opponent	Record
1	L	October 9, 1954	1–4	@ Montreal Canadiens (1954–55)	0–1–0
2	T	October 11, 1954	2–2	Montreal Canadiens (1954–55)	0–1–1
3	W	October 14, 1954	5–3	New York Rangers (1954–55)	1–1–1
4	T	October 17, 1954	1–1	Toronto Maple Leafs (1954–55)	1–1–2
5	L	October 20, 1954	2–6	@ New York Rangers (1954–55)	1–2–2
6	L	October 21, 1954	3–5	@ Detroit Red Wings (1954–55)	1–3–2
7	T	October 23, 1954	3–3	@ Toronto Maple Leafs (1954–55)	1–3–3
8	L	October 30, 1954	0–4	@ Detroit Red Wings (1954–55)	1–4–3

November

Game	Result	Date	Score	Opponent	Record
9	L	November 4, 1954	2–3	Detroit Red Wings (1954–55)	1–5–3
10	L	November 7, 1954	3–4	Montreal Canadiens (1954–55)	1–6–3
11	W	November 10, 1954	4–3	Chicago Black Hawks (1954–55)	2–6–3
12	L	November 13, 1954	1–2	@ Montreal Canadiens (1954–55)	2–7–3
13	L	November 14, 1954	1–3	Toronto Maple Leafs (1954–55)	2–8–3
14	T	November 17, 1954	2–2	@ New York Rangers (1954–55)	2–8–4
15	W	November 18, 1954	5–1	@ Chicago Black Hawks (1954–55)	3–8–4
16	W	November 20, 1954	1–0	@ Toronto Maple Leafs (1954–55)	4–8–4
17	W	November 21, 1954	2–0	Montreal Canadiens (1954–55)	5–8–4
18	L	November 24, 1954	1–3	@ New York Rangers (1954–55)	5–9–4
19	T	November 25, 1954	2–2	New York Rangers (1954–55)	5–9–5
20	W	November 28, 1954	6–2	Detroit Red Wings (1954–55)	6–9–5

December

Game	Result	Date	Score	Opponent	Record
21	L	December 1, 1954	0–6	@ Toronto Maple Leafs (1954–55)	6–10–5
22	W	December 2, 1954	3–2	@ Chicago Black Hawks (1954–55)	7–10–5
23	W	December 4, 1954	6–3	New York Rangers (1954–55)	8–10–5
24	L	December 5, 1954	2–4	Toronto Maple Leafs (1954–55)	8–11–5
25	W	December 9, 1954	2–1	Chicago Black Hawks (1954–55)	9–11–5
26	W	December 11, 1954	3–0	@ Montreal Canadiens (1954–55)	10–11–5
27	T	December 12, 1954	2–2	Montreal Canadiens (1954–55)	10–11–6
28	L	December 16, 1954	2–4	Detroit Red Wings (1954–55)	10–12–6
29	L	December 18, 1954	1–4	@ Detroit Red Wings (1954–55)	10–13–6
30	L	December 19, 1954	1–6	@ Chicago Black Hawks (1954–55)	10–14–6
31	T	December 25, 1954	3–3	Chicago Black Hawks (1954–55)	10–14–7
32	L	December 30, 1954	1–6	@ New York Rangers (1954–55)	10–15–7

January

Game	Result	Date	Score	Opponent	Record
33	W	January 1, 1955	4–0	New York Rangers (1954–55)	11–15–7
34	T	January 2, 1955	3–3	@ New York Rangers (1954–55)	11–15–8
35	W	January 5, 1955	2–1	@ Toronto Maple Leafs (1954–55)	12–15–8
36	T	January 6, 1955	3–3	@ Detroit Red Wings (1954–55)	12–15–9
37	T	January 8, 1955	1–1	@ Montreal Canadiens (1954–55)	12–15–10
38	T	January 9, 1955	1–1	Toronto Maple Leafs (1954–55)	12–15–11
39	T	January 12, 1955	1–1	@ Chicago Black Hawks (1954–55)	12–15–12
40	L	January 13, 1955	0–4	@ Detroit Red Wings (1954–55)	12–16–12
41	L	January 15, 1955	2–4	@ Toronto Maple Leafs (1954–55)	12–17–12
42	W	January 16, 1955	6–0	Montreal Canadiens (1954–55)	13–17–12
43	W	January 20, 1955	3–2	Detroit Red Wings (1954–55)	14–17–12
44	W	January 22, 1955	3–1	New York Rangers (1954–55)	15–17–12
45	L	January 23, 1955	0–2	New York Rangers (1954–55)	15–18–12
46	W	January 27, 1955	5–2	Chicago Black Hawks (1954–55)	16–18–12
47	L	January 29, 1955	0–4	@ Montreal Canadiens (1954–55)	16–19–12
48	W	January 30, 1955	3–0	Toronto Maple Leafs (1954–55)	17–19–12

February

Game	Result	Date	Score	Opponent	Record
49	W	February 2, 1955	3–2	@ Chicago Black Hawks (1954–55)	18–19–12
50	T	February 3, 1955	1–1	@ Detroit Red Wings (1954–55)	18–19–13
51	W	February 5, 1955	8–4	Detroit Red Wings (1954–55)	19–19–13
52	T	February 6, 1955	2–2	Detroit Red Wings (1954–55)	19–19–14
53	W	February 10, 1955	4–2	Chicago Black Hawks (1954–55)	20–19–14
54	T	February 12, 1955	5–5	New York Rangers (1954–55)	20–19–15
55	T	February 13, 1955	3–3	Toronto Maple Leafs (1954–55)	20–19–16
56	T	February 16, 1955	2–2	@ New York Rangers (1954–55)	20–19–17
57	L	February 17, 1955	2–10	@ Chicago Black Hawks (1954–55)	20–20–17
58	T	February 19, 1955	1–1	@ Toronto Maple Leafs (1954–55)	20–20–18
59	T	February 21, 1955	2–2	@ Detroit Red Wings (1954–55)	20–20–19
60	T	February 23, 1955	3–3	@ Chicago Black Hawks (1954–55)	20–20–20
61	L	February 26, 1955	1–4	@ Montreal Canadiens (1954–55)	20–21–20

March

Game	Result	Date	Score	Opponent	Record
62	W	March 2, 1955	2–1	@ New York Rangers (1954–55)	21–21–20
63	L	March 3, 1955	1–4	Montreal Canadiens (1954–55)	21–22–20
64	T	March 5, 1955	2–2	@ Toronto Maple Leafs (1954–55)	21–22–21
65	W	March 6, 1955	3–1	Toronto Maple Leafs (1954–55)	22–22–21
66	L	March 10, 1955	2–3	Chicago Black Hawks (1954–55)	22–23–21
67	L	March 12, 1955	1–2	@ Montreal Canadiens (1954–55)	22–24–21
68	W	March 13, 1955	4–2	Montreal Canadiens (1954–55)	23–24–21
69	L	March 16, 1955	4–5	Detroit Red Wings (1954–55)	23–25–21
70	L	March 20, 1955	3–4	Chicago Black Hawks (1954–55)	23–26–21

Legend: Win (2 points) Loss (0 points) Tie (1 point)

== Player statistics ==
=== Forwards ===
Note: GP = Games played; G = Goals; A = Assists; Pts = Points; PIM = Penalty minutes

Player	GP	G	A	Pts	PIM
Don McKenney	69	22	20	42	34
Leo Labine	67	24	18	42	75
Réal Chevrefils	64	18	22	40	30
Cal Gardner	70	16	22	38	40
Fleming Mackell	60	11	24	35	76
Lorne Ferguson	69	20	14	34	24
Ed Sandford	60	14	20	34	38
Doug Mohns	70	14	18	32	82
Murray Costello	54	4	11	15	25
Milt Schmidt	23	4	8	12	26
Gus Bodnar	67	4	4	8	14
Floyd Smith	3	0	1	1	0
Skip Teal	1	0	0	0	0
Norm Corcoran	2	0	0	0	2
Joe Klukay	10	0	0	0	4

=== Defensemen ===
Note: GP = Games played; G = Goals; A = Assists; Pts = Points; PIM = Penalty minutes

Player	GP	G	A	Pts	PIM
Bill Quackenbush	68	2	20	22	8
Warren Godfrey	62	1	17	18	58
Fernie Flaman	70	4	14	18	150
Leo Boivin	59	6	11	17	105
Hal Laycoe	70	4	13	17	34
Bob Armstrong	57	1	3	4	38

=== Goaltending ===
Note: GP= Games played; W= Wins; L= Losses; T = Ties; SO = Shutouts; GAA = Goals against average

Player	GP	W	L	T	SO	GAA
John Henderson	45	15	14	15	5	2.49
Jim Henry	27	8	12	6	1	3.02

== Awards and records ==
- Fernie Flaman, Defense, NHL Second Team All-Star
