= 1954–55 Toronto Maple Leafs season =

NHL hockey team season

1954–55 Toronto Maple Leafs
- League: 3rd NHL
- 1954–55 record: 24–24–22
- Home record: 14–10–11
- Road record: 10–14–11
- Goals for: 147
- Goals against: 135

Team information
- General manager: Conn Smythe
- Coach: King Clancy
- Captain: Ted Kennedy
- Arena: Maple Leaf Gardens

Team leaders
- Goals: Sid Smith (33)
- Assists: Ted Kennedy (42)
- Points: Sid Smith (54)
- Penalty minutes: Eric Nesterenko (99)
- Wins: Harry Lumley (23)
- Goals against average: Harry Lumley (1.94)

The 1954–55 Toronto Maple Leafs season saw the Maple Leafs finish in third place in the National Hockey League (NHL) with a record of 24 wins, 24 losses, and 22 ties for 70 points. They were swept in the semi-finals by the eventual Stanley Cup champion Detroit Red Wings.

== Regular season ==
=== Final standings ===
National Hockey League
		GP	W	L	T	GF	GA	DIFF	Pts
1	Detroit Red Wings	70	42	17	11	204	134	+70	95
2	Montreal Canadiens	70	41	18	11	228	157	+71	93
3	Toronto Maple Leafs	70	24	24	22	147	135	+12	70
4	Boston Bruins	70	23	26	21	169	188	−19	67
5	New York Rangers	70	17	35	18	150	210	−60	52
6	Chicago Black Hawks	70	13	40	17	161	235	−74	43

=== Record vs. opponents ===
1954–55 NHL Records
Team	BOS	CHI	DET	MTL	NYR	TOR
Boston	—	7–4–3	3–7–4	4–7–3	5–4–5	4–4–6
Chicago	4–7–3	—	1–12–1	0–11–3	5–4–5	3–6–5
Detroit	7–3–4	12–1–1	—	7–7	9–2–3	7–4–3
Montreal	7–4–3	11–0–3	7–7	—	10–3–1	6–4–4
New York	4–5–5	4–5–5	2–9–3	3–10–1	—	4–6–4
Toronto	4–4–6	6–3–5	4–7–3	4–6–4	6–4–4	—

== Schedule and results ==
1954–55 regular season
October

Game	Result	Date	Score	Opponent	Record
1	L	October 7	1–2	@ Detroit Red Wings (1954–55)	0–1–0
2	T	October 9	3–3	Chicago Black Hawks (1954–55)	0–1–1
3	L	October 16	2–4	New York Rangers (1954–55)	0–2–1
4	T	October 17	1–1	@ Boston Bruins (1954–55)	0–2–2
5	W	October 21	3–1	@ Montreal Canadiens (1954–55)	1–2–2
6	T	October 23	3–3	Boston Bruins (1954–55)	1–2–3
7	L	October 27	1–3	Montreal Canadiens (1954–55)	1–3–3
8	W	October 30	3–1	New York Rangers (1954–55)	2–3–3

November

Game	Result	Date	Score	Opponent	Record
9	T	November 3	1–1	Detroit Red Wings (1954–55)	2–3–4
10	W	November 6	5–2	Chicago Black Hawks (1954–55)	3–3–4
11	W	November 7	2–1	@ Chicago Black Hawks (1954–55)	4–3–4
12	W	November 10	2–1	@ New York Rangers (1954–55)	5–3–4
13	W	November 11	1–0	@ Detroit Red Wings (1954–55)	6–3–4
14	W	November 13	1–0	Detroit Red Wings (1954–55)	7–3–4
15	W	November 14	3–1	@ Boston Bruins (1954–55)	8–3–4
16	W	November 17	5–2	Montreal Canadiens (1954–55)	9–3–4
17	L	November 18	4–5	@ Montreal Canadiens (1954–55)	9–4–4
18	L	November 20	0–1	Boston Bruins (1954–55)	9–5–4
19	T	November 21	2–2	@ New York Rangers (1954–55)	9–5–5
20	L	November 25	0–2	@ Detroit Red Wings (1954–55)	9–6–5
21	W	November 27	3–1	New York Rangers (1954–55)	10–6–5
22	T	November 28	1–1	@ Chicago Black Hawks (1954–55)	10–6–6

December

Game	Result	Date	Score	Opponent	Record
23	W	December 1	6–0	Boston Bruins (1954–55)	11–6–6
24	W	December 4	1–0	Detroit Red Wings (1954–55)	12–6–6
25	W	December 5	4–2	@ Boston Bruins (1954–55)	13–6–6
26	W	December 8	3–1	Montreal Canadiens (1954–55)	14–6–6
27	L	December 9	0–2	@ Montreal Canadiens (1954–55)	14–7–6
28	L	December 11	1–2	Chicago Black Hawks (1954–55)	14–8–6
29	T	December 12	1–1	@ New York Rangers (1954–55)	14–8–7
30	W	December 15	8–3	@ Chicago Black Hawks (1954–55)	15–8–7
31	W	December 18	3–1	New York Rangers (1954–55)	16–8–7
32	T	December 19	3–3	@ New York Rangers (1954–55)	16–8–8
33	L	December 25	2–3	Detroit Red Wings (1954–55)	16–9–8
34	T	December 26	1–1	@ Detroit Red Wings (1954–55)	16–9–9
35	T	December 29	1–1	Montreal Canadiens (1954–55)	16–9–10
36	L	December 30	1–4	@ Detroit Red Wings (1954–55)	16–10–10

January

Game	Result	Date	Score	Opponent	Record
37	T	January 1	2–2	Chicago Black Hawks (1954–55)	16–10–11
38	L	January 2	2–3	@ Chicago Black Hawks (1954–55)	16–11–11
39	L	January 5	1–2	Boston Bruins (1954–55)	16–12–11
40	W	January 8	5–0	New York Rangers (1954–55)	17–12–11
41	T	January 9	1–1	@ Boston Bruins (1954–55)	17–12–12
42	T	January 12	0–0	@ New York Rangers (1954–55)	17–12–13
43	W	January 15	4–2	Boston Bruins (1954–55)	18–12–13
44	W	January 16	4–2	@ Chicago Black Hawks (1954–55)	19–12–13
45	T	January 19	3–3	Chicago Black Hawks (1954–55)	19–12–14
46	L	January 20	2–6	@ Montreal Canadiens (1954–55)	19–13–14
47	W	January 22	3–1	Detroit Red Wings (1954–55)	20–13–14
48	L	January 23	0–4	@ Detroit Red Wings (1954–55)	20–14–14
49	T	January 26	1–1	Montreal Canadiens (1954–55)	20–14–15
50	L	January 29	1–3	New York Rangers (1954–55)	20–15–15
51	L	January 30	0–3	@ Boston Bruins (1954–55)	20–16–15

February

Game	Result	Date	Score	Opponent	Record
52	L	February 3	2–3	@ Montreal Canadiens (1954–55)	20–17–15
53	T	February 5	2–2	Chicago Black Hawks (1954–55)	20–17–16
54	W	February 6	4–2	@ Chicago Black Hawks (1954–55)	21–17–16
55	W	February 9	3–1	Montreal Canadiens (1954–55)	22–17–16
56	L	February 12	1–2	Detroit Red Wings (1954–55)	22–18–16
57	T	February 13	3–3	@ Boston Bruins (1954–55)	22–18–17
58	T	February 19	1–1	Boston Bruins (1954–55)	22–18–18
59	L	February 20	1–4	@ Chicago Black Hawks (1954–55)	22–19–18
60	W	February 23	3–1	@ New York Rangers (1954–55)	23–19–18
61	T	February 24	1–1	@ Montreal Canadiens (1954–55)	23–19–19
62	T	February 26	1–1	Detroit Red Wings (1954–55)	23–19–20

March

Game	Result	Date	Score	Opponent	Record
63	L	March 2	2–3	Montreal Canadiens (1954–55)	23–20–20
64	T	March 5	2–2	Boston Bruins (1954–55)	23–20–21
65	L	March 6	1–3	@ Boston Bruins (1954–55)	23–21–21
66	T	March 10	0–0	@ Montreal Canadiens (1954–55)	23–21–22
67	L	March 12	1–2	New York Rangers (1954–55)	23–22–22
68	L	March 13	1–6	@ Detroit Red Wings (1954–55)	23–23–22
69	W	March 19	5–0	Chicago Black Hawks (1954–55)	24–23–22
70	L	March 20	2–3	@ New York Rangers (1954–55)	24–24–22

Legend: Win (2 points) Loss (0 points) Tie (1 point)

== Playoffs ==
1955 Stanley Cup playoffs
Semifinals vs. (1) Detroit Red Wings – Red Wings win 4–0

Game	Result	Date	Score	Opponent	Series
1	L	March 22	4–7	@ Detroit Red Wings (1954–55)	0–1
2	L	March 24	1–2	@ Detroit Red Wings (1954–55)	0–2
3	L	March 26	1–2	Detroit Red Wings (1954–55)	0–3
4	L	March 29	0–3	Detroit Red Wings (1954–55)	0–4

Legend: Win Loss

== Player statistics ==
=== Regular season ===
Scoring

Player	GP	G	A	Pts	PIM
Sid Smith	70	33	21	54	14
Ted Kennedy	70	10	42	52	74
Eric Nesterenko	62	15	15	30	99
Tod Sloan	63	13	15	28	89
George Armstrong	66	10	18	28	80
Rudy Migay	67	8	16	24	66
Hugh Bolton	69	2	19	21	55
Ron Stewart	53	14	5	19	20
Jim Morrison	70	5	12	17	84
Joe Klukay	56	8	8	16	44
Jimmy Thomson	70	4	12	16	63
Tim Horton	67	5	9	14	84
Parker MacDonald	62	8	3	11	36
Brian Cullen	27	3	5	8	6
Bob Bailey	32	4	2	6	52
Bob Solinger	17	1	5	6	11
Larry Cahan	59	0	6	6	64
Willie Marshall	16	1	4	5	0
Dave Creighton	14	2	1	3	8
Harry Watson	8	1	1	2	0
Gord Hannigan	13	0	2	2	8
Leo Boivin	7	0	0	0	8
Jack Caffery	3	0	0	0	0
Dick Duff	3	0	0	0	2
Gerry Foley	4	0	0	0	8
Gerry James	1	0	0	0	0
Paul Knox	1	0	0	0	0
Harry Lumley	69	0	0	0	9
Gilles Mayer	1	0	0	0	0
Marc Reaume	1	0	0	0	4
Dave Reid	1	0	0	0	0
Ray Timgren	1	0	0	0	2

Goaltending

Player	MIN	GP	W	L	T	GA	GAA	SA	SV	SV%	SO
Harry Lumley	4140	69	23	24	22	134	1.94				8
Gilles Mayer	60	1	1	0	0	1	1.00				0
Team:	4200	70	24	24	22	135	1.93				8

=== Playoffs ===
Scoring

Player	GP	G	A	Pts	PIM
Sid Smith	4	3	1	4	0
Ted Kennedy	4	1	3	4	0
Hugh Bolton	4	0	3	3	6
George Armstrong	4	1	0	1	4
Brian Cullen	4	1	0	1	0
Jim Morrison	4	0	1	1	4
Eric Nesterenko	4	0	1	1	6
Bob Bailey	1	0	0	0	0
Larry Cahan	4	0	0	0	0
Joe Klukay	4	0	0	0	4
Harry Lumley	4	0	0	0	0
Parker MacDonald	4	0	0	0	4
Rudy Migay	3	0	0	0	10
Marc Reaume	4	0	0	0	2
Tod Sloan	4	0	0	0	2
Ron Stewart	4	0	0	0	2
Jimmy Thomson	4	0	0	0	16

Goaltending

Player	MIN	GP	W	L	T	GA	GAA	SA	SV	SV%	SO
Harry Lumley	240	4	0	4		14	3.50				0
Team:	240	4	0	4		14	3.50				0

== See also ==
- 1954–55 NHL season
