= André Binette =

Canadian ice hockey player

- Born: December 2, 1933 Montreal, Quebec, Canada
- Died: August 16, 2004 (aged 70) Saint-Donat, Quebec, Canada
- Height: 5 ft 8 in (173 cm)
- Weight: 140 lb (64 kg; 10 st 0 lb)
- Position: Goaltender
- Shot: Left
- Played for: Montreal Canadiens
- Playing career: 1953–1963

André Binette (December 2, 1933 – August 16, 2004) was a Canadian ice hockey goaltender. He played one game in the National Hockey League with the Montreal Canadiens during the 1954–55 season, on November 11, 1954 against the Chicago Black Hawks. Binette was called up to replace Jacques Plante, who was injured in the pre-game warm-up. He allowed four goals and won the game. He was born in Montreal, Quebec.

On August 16, 2004, Binette died from a heart attack while playing tennis with his son.

== Career statistics ==
=== Regular season and playoffs ===
			Regular season								Playoffs
Season	Team	League	GP	W	L	T	MIN	GA	SO	GAA	GP	W	L	MIN	GA	SO	GAA
1953–54	Trois-Rivières Reds	QJHL-B	48	24	22	2	2850	180	1	3.79	3	—	—	180	22	0	7.33
1954–55	Montreal Canadiens	NHL	1	1	0	0	60	4	0	4.00	—	—	—	—	—	—	—
1954–55	Shawinigan Falls Cataractes	QSHL	4	2	2	0	240	16	0	4.00	1	0	1	60	4	0	4.00
1955–56	Cornwall Colts	EOHL	2	0	2	0	120	16	0	8.00	—	—	—	—	—	—	—
1956–57	Troy Bruins	IHL	20	—	—	—	1200	75	1	3.75	—	—	—	—	—	—	—
1956–57	Clinton Comets	EHL	38	—	—	—	2280	181	0	4.76	—	—	—	—	—	—	—
1957–58	Chatham Maroons	OHA Sr	1	1	0	0	60	2	0	2.00	—	—	—	—	—	—	—
1957–58	Toledo Mercurys	IHL	46	—	—	—	2740	174	3	3.81	—	—	—	—	—	—	—
1961–62	Montreal Olympics	QSHL	3	2	1	0	180	12	0	4.00	13	8	5	780	33	2	2.54
1961–62	Montreal Olympics	Al-Cup	—	—	—	—	—	—	—	—	16	11	5	971	42	4	2.60
NHL totals			1	1	0	0	60	4	0	4.00	—	—	—	—	—	—	—

== See also ==
- List of players who played only one game in the NHL
