= List of winning streaks in the Olympic Games =

The following is a list of winning streaks in the Olympic Games.

== Diving ==
=== Men's ===
==== 10m Platform ====
3 consecutive gold medals at Olympic Games – Klaus Dibiasi

- Streak started 1968 Mexico City, Mexico
- Streak ended 1980 Moscow, Soviet Union

7 consecutive gold medals at Olympic Games – United States

- Streak started 1920 Antwerp, Belgium
- Streak ended 1956 Melbourne, Australia

==== 3m Springboard ====
11 consecutive gold medals at Olympic Games – United States

- Streak started 1920 Antwerp, Belgium
- Streak ended 1972 Munich, West Germany

==== Synchronized 10m Platform ====
6 consecutive gold medals at Olympic Games – China

- Streak started 2004 Athens, Greece

=== Women's ===
==== 10m Platform ====
7 consecutive gold medals at Olympic Games – United States

- Streak started 1924 Paris, France
- Streak ended 1960 Rome, Italy

==== 3m Springboard ====
10 consecutive gold medals at Olympic Games – China

- Streak started 1988 Seoul, South Korea

==== 3m Springboard ====
8 consecutive gold medals at Olympic Games – United States

- Streak started 1920 Antwerp, Belgium
- Streak ended 1960 Rome, Italy

==== Synchronized 10m Platform ====
7 consecutive gold medals at Olympic Games – China

- Streak started 2000 Sydney, Australia

==== Synchronized 3m Springboard ====
6 consecutive gold medals at Olympic Games – China

- Streak started 2004 Athens, Greece

== Swimming ==
Johnny Weissmuller never lost a swimming race during his entire amateur career, including three individual Olympic gold medals. He is purported to have told the other swimmers in his Olympic final that they could fight it out for second place. Michael Phelps was similarly undefeated in the finals of the 200m butterfly for ten years before the 2012 Olympics, where he was defeated by Chad le Clos. The last time Phelps had lost the race was in 2002 when he lost to Olympic champion Tom Malchow at the 2002 Pan Pacific Swimming Championships.

=== Men's ===
==== 100m Freestyle ====
5 consecutive gold medals at Olympic Games – United States

- Streak started 1908 London, United Kingdom
- Streak ended 1932 Los Angeles, United States

==== 400m Freestyle ====
3 consecutive gold medals at Olympic Games – United States

- Streak started 1932 Los Angeles, United States
- Streak ended 1952 Helsinki, Finland

==== 800m Freestyle ====
2 consecutive gold medals at Olympic Games – Bobby Finke

- Streak started 2020 Tokyo, Japan

==== 1500m Freestyle ====
4 consecutive gold medals at Olympic Games – Australia

- Streak started 1992 Barcelona, Spain
- Streak ended 2008 Beijing, China

==== 100m Backstroke ====
6 consecutive gold medals at Olympic Games – United States

- Streak started 1996 Atlanta, United States

==== 200m Backstroke ====
6 consecutive gold medals at Olympic Games – United States

- Streak started 1996 Atlanta, United States
- Streak ended 2021 Tokyo, Japan

==== 200m Breaststroke ====
3 consecutive gold medals at Olympic Games – Japan

- Streak started 1928 Amsterdam, Netherlands
- Streak ended 1948 London, United Kingdom

==== 100m Butterfly ====
3 consecutive gold medals at Olympic Games – Michael Phelps

- Streak started 2004 Athens, Greece
- Streak ended 2016 Rio de Janeiro, Brazil

3 consecutive gold medals at Olympic Games

- United States
  - Streak started 1968 Mexico City, Mexico
  - Streak ended 1980 Moscow, Soviet Union
- United States
  - Streak started 2004 Athens, Greece
  - Streak started 2016 Rio de Janeiro, Brazil

==== 200m Butterfly ====
3 consecutive gold medals at Olympic Games

- United States
  - Streak started 1968 Mexico City, Mexico
  - Streak ended 1980 Moscow, Soviet Union
- United States
  - Streak started 2000 Sydney, Australia
  - Streak ended 2012 London, United Kingdom

==== 200m Individual Medley ====
4 consecutive gold medals at Olympic Games – Michael Phelps

- Streak started 2004 Athens, Greece
- Streak started 2016 Rio de Janeiro, Brazil

3 consecutive gold medals at Olympic Games

- Hungary
  - Streak started 1988 Seoul, South Korea
  - Streak ended 2000 Sydney, Australia
- United States
  - Streak started 2004 Athens, Greece

==== 400m Individual Medley ====
5 consecutive gold medals at Olympic Games – United States

- Streak started 1996 Atlanta, United States
- Streak ended 2016 Rio de Janeiro, Brasil

==== 4 × 100 m Freestyle Relay ====
7 consecutive titles at Olympic Games – United States

- Streak started 1964 Tokyo, Japan (Inaugural Competition)
- Streak ended 2000 Sydney, Australia

==== 4 × 200 m Freestyle Relay ====
7 consecutive titles at Olympic Games – United States

- Streak started 1960 Rome, Italy
- Streak ended 1992 Barcelona, Spain

Note: excluding boycotted Moscow Olympics

==== 4 × 100 m Medley Relay ====
15 consecutive titles at Olympic Games – United States

- Streak started 1960 Rome, Italy (Inaugural Competition)
- Streak ended 2024 Paris, France

Note: excluding boycotted Moscow Olympics

=== Women's ===
==== 100m Freestyle ====
4 consecutive titles at Olympic Games – United States

- Streak started 1920 Antwerp, Belgium
- Streak ended 1936 Berlin, Germany

3 consecutive titles at Olympic Games – Dawn Fraser

- Streak started 1956 Melbourne, Australia
- Streak ended 1968 Mexico City, Mexico

==== 400m Freestyle ====
3 consecutive titles at Olympic Games

- United States
  - Streak started 1924 Paris, France
  - Streak ended 1936 Berlin, Germany
- United States
  - Streak started 1960 Rome, Italy
  - Streak ended 1972 Munich, West Germany

==== 800m Freestyle ====
5 consecutive titles at Olympic Games – United States

- Streak started 1984 Los Angeles, United States
- Streak ended 2004 Athens, Greece

4 consecutive titles at Olympic Games – Katie Ledecky

- Streak started 2012 London, United Kingdom

==== 1500m Freestyle ====
2 consecutive titles at Olympic Games – Katie Ledecky

- Streak started 2020 Tokyo, Japan

==== 100m Backstroke ====
4 consecutive titles at Olympic Games – United States

- Streak started 1960 Rome, Italy
- Streak ended 1976 Montreal, Canada

==== 200m Backstroke ====
3 consecutive titles at Olympic Games – Krisztina Egerszegi

- Streak started 1988 Seoul, South Korea
- Streak ended 2000 Sydney, Australia

3 consecutive titles at Olympic Games – Hungary

- Streak started 1988 Seoul, South Korea
- Streak ended 2000 Sydney, Australia

==== 200m Breaststroke ====
3 consecutive titles at Olympic Games – United States

- Streak started 2004 Athens, Greece
- Streak ended 2016 Rio de Janeiro, Brazil

==== 100m Butterfly ====
3 consecutive titles at Olympic Games – United States

- Streak started 1956 Melbourne, Australia (Inaugural Competition)
- Streak ended 1968 Mexico City, Mexico

==== 4 × 100 m Freestyle Relay ====
6 consecutive titles at Olympic Games – United States

- Streak started 1960 Rome, Italy
- Streak ended 1988 Seoul, South Korea

Note: excluding boycotted Moscow Olympics

==== 4 × 200 m Freestyle Relay ====
3 consecutive titles at Olympic Games – United States

- Streak started 1996 Atlanta, United States (Inaugural Competition)
- Streak ended 2008 Beijing, China

==== 4 × 100 m Medley Relay ====
4 consecutive titles at Olympic Games – United States

- Streak started 1960 Rome, Italy (Inaugural Competition)
- Streak ended 1976 Montreal, Canada

=== Synchronized swimming ===
==== Duet ====
4 consecutive gold medals at Olympics – Russia

- Streak started 2000 Sydney, Australia

==== Team ====
4 consecutive gold medals at Olympics – Russia

- Streak started 2000 Sydney, Australia

== Archery ==
=== Men's ===
==== Team ====
3 consecutive gold medals at Olympic games – South Korea

- Streak started 2000 Sydney, Australia
- Streak ended 2012 London, England
- Streak started 2016 Rio de Janeiro, Brazil (Ongoing)

=== Women's ===
==== Individual ====
6 consecutive gold medals at Olympic games – South Korea

- Streak started 1984 Los Angeles, United States
- Streak ended 2008 Beijing, China

==== Team ====
10 consecutive gold medals at Olympic games – South Korea

- Streak started 1988 Seoul, South Korea (Inaugural Team Competition)

== Athletics ==
The longest nation streak and the longest athlete streak are listed if they are at least three.

=== Men's ===
Event	Streak	Nation / athlete	Start	End
100 m	5	United States	1932 Los Angeles	1960 Rome
100 m	3	Usain Bolt (Jamaica)	2008 Beijing	2021 Tokyo
200 m	5	United States	1932 Los Angeles	1960 Rome
200 m	3	Usain Bolt (Jamaica)	2008 Beijing	2021 Tokyo
400 m	7	United States	1984 Los Angeles	2012 London
800 m	4	Great Britain	1920 Antwerp	1936 Berlin
800 m	4	United States	1936 Berlin	1960 Rome
5000 m	4	Finland	1924 Paris	1948 London
10000 m	4	Ethiopia	1996 Atlanta	2012 London
Marathon	3	Ethiopia	1960 Rome	1972 Munich
110 m hurdles	9	United States	1932 Los Angeles	1976 Montreal
400 m hurdles	6	United States	1936 Berlin	1968 Mexico City
3000 m steeplechase	9	Kenya	1984 Los Angeles	2021 Tokyo
4 × 100 m relay	8	United States	1920 Antwerp	1960 Rome
4 × 400 m relay	4	United States	1956 Melbourne	1972 Munich
4 × 400 m relay	4	United States	1984 Los Angeles	2000 Sydney
50 km race walk	3	Robert Korzeniowski (Poland)	1996 Atlanta	2008 Beijing
High jump	8	United States	1896 Athens	1932 Los Angeles
Pole vault	16	United States	1896 Athens	1972 Munich
Long jump	8	United States	1924 Paris	1964 Tokyo
Long jump	4	Carl Lewis (United States)	1984 Los Angeles	2000 Sydney
Triple jump	4	Soviet Union	1968 Mexico City	1984 Los Angeles
Triple jump	3	Viktor Saneyev (Soviet Union)	1968 Mexico City	1980 Moscow
Shot put	6	United States	1948 London	1972 Munich
Shot put	3	Ryan Crouser (United States)	2016 Rio de Janeiro	Ongoing
Discus throw	5	United States	1952 Helsinki	1972 Munich
Discus throw	4	Al Oerter (United States)	1956 Melbourne	1972 Munich
Hammer throw	6	United States	1900 Paris	1928 Amsterdam
Hammer throw	3	John Flanagan (United States)	1900 Paris	1912 Stockholm
Javelin throw	3	Jan Železný (Czechoslovakia/ Czech Republic)	1992 Barcelona	2004 Athens
Decathlon	6	United States	1932 Los Angeles	1964 Tokyo
Discontinued events
Standing high jump	4	United States	1900 Paris	Discontinued 1920
Standing high jump	3	Ray Ewry (United States)	1900 Paris	1912 Stockholm
Standing long jump	3	Ray Ewry (United States)	1900 Paris	1920 Antwerp

=== Women's ===
Event	Streak	Nation	Start	End
100 m	4	United States	1984 Los Angeles	2000 Sydney
100 m	4	Jamaica	2008 Beijing	2024 Paris
200 m	3	East Germany	1972 Munich	1984 Los Angeles
200 m	3	United States	1984 Los Angeles	1996 Atlanta
1500 m	3	Soviet Union	1972 Munich	1984 Los Angeles
1500 m	3	Faith Kipyegon (Kenya)	2016 Rio	Ongoing
5000 m	3	Ethiopia	2004 Athens	2016 Rio de Janeiro
10,000 m	3	Ethiopia	2008 Beijing	2024 Paris
4 × 100 m relay	4	United States	1984 Los Angeles	2000 Sydney
4 × 400 m relay	8	United States	1996 Atlanta	Ongoing
Shot put	4	Soviet Union	1952 Helsinki	1968 Mexico City
Hammer throw	3	Anita Włodarczyk (Poland)	2012 London	2024 Paris
Heptathlon	3	Nafissatou Thiam (Belgium)	2016 Rio de Janeiro	Ongoing

== Badminton ==
=== Women's doubles ===
5 consecutive titles at Olympic Games – China

- Streak started 1996 Atlanta, United States
- Streak ended 2016 Rio de Janeiro, Brazil

== Basketball ==
=== Men's ===
63 consecutive games – United States

- Streak started August 7, 1936 (defeated Spain, forfeit)
- Streak ended September 9, 1972 (defeated by Soviet Union, 51–50)

7 consecutive gold medals – United States

- Streak started 1936 Berlin, Germany
- Streak ended 1972 Munich, West Germany

=== Women's ===
61 consecutive games – United States

- Streak started August 7, 1992 (defeated Cuba, 88–74)

8 consecutive gold medals – United States

- Streak started 1996 Atlanta, United States

== Boxing ==
3 consecutive Olympic gold medals

- László Papp
  - Streak started 1948 London, United Kingdom
  - Streak ended 1960 Rome, Italy
- Teófilo Stevenson
  - Streak started 1972 Munich, West Germany
  - Streak ended 1984 Los Angeles, United States (boycotted by Cuba and also exceeded AIBA's age limit)
- Félix Savón
  - Streak started 1992 Barcelona, Spain
  - Streak ended 2004 Athens, Greece

7 consecutive Olympic heavyweight titles – Cuba

- Streak started 1972 Munich, West Germany
- Streak ended 2008 Beijing, China

Note: excluding boycotted Los Angeles and Seoul Olympics

== Curling ==
=== Men's Team ===
3 consecutive gold medals at Winter Olympics – Canada

- Streak started 2006 Turin, Italy

== Equine sports ==
=== Dressage ===
7 consecutive Olympic Team titles – West Germany and Germany

- Streak started 1984 Los Angeles, USA
- Streak ended 2012 London, United Kingdom

== Fencing ==
=== Women's Foil ===
3 consecutive Olympic titles – Valentina Vezzali

- Streak started 2000 Sydney, Australia
- Streak ended 2012 London, United Kingdom

=== Men's Saber ===
3 consecutive Olympic titles – Áron Szilágyi

- Streak started 2012 London, United Kingdom
- Streak ended 2024 Paris, France

== Figure skating ==
=== Men's ===
3 consecutive Olympic gold medals

- Gillis Grafström
  - Streak started 1920 Antwerp, Belgium
  - Streak ended 1932 Lake Placid, USA

=== Women's ===
3 consecutive Olympic gold medals

- Sonja Henie
  - Streak started 1928 St. Moritz, Switzerland
  - Streak ended 1948 St. Moritz, Switzerland
- Irina Rodnina
  - Streak started 1972 Sapporo, Japan
  - Streak ended 1984 Sarajevo, Yugoslavia

=== Pairs ===
12 consecutive Olympic titles – USSR, Unified Team and Russia

- Streak started 1964 Innsbruck, Austria – Ludmila Belousova and Oleg Protopopov
- Streak ended 2010 Vancouver, Canada – won by Shen Xue and Zhao Hongbo

Note: this streak includes a win reduced to a draw after the 2002 Olympics.

== Field hockey ==
=== Men's ===
6 consecutive gold medals

- India
  - Streak started 1928 Amsterdam, Netherlands
  - Streak ended 1956 Melbourne, Australia

== Gymnastics ==
=== Men's ===
5 consecutive Men's Team all-around titles at Olympic Games – Japan

- Streak started 1960 Tokyo, Japan
- Streak ended 1980 Moscow, Soviet Union (boycotted)

=== Women's ===
10 consecutive Women's Team all-around titles at Olympic Games – Soviet Union and Unified Team

- Streak started 1952 Helsinki, Finland
- Streak ended 1996 Atlanta, United States

Note: excluding boycotted Los Angeles Olympics

== Handball ==
=== Men's ===
3 consecutive Women's titles at Handball at the Summer Olympics

- Denmark
  - Streak started 1996 Atlanta, United States
  - Streak ended 2008 Beijing, China

== Ice hockey ==
=== Men's ===
4 consecutive gold medals

- Canada
  - Streak started 1920 Antwerp, Belgium
  - Streak ended 1936 Garmisch-Partenkirchen, Germany
- Soviet Union
  - Streak started 1964 Innsbruck, Austria
  - Streak ended 1980 Lake Placid, United States

=== Women's ===
4 consecutive gold medals – Canada

- Streak started 2002 Salt Lake City, United States
- Streak ended 2018 Gangneung, South Korea

== Rugby sevens ==
=== Men's ===
17 consecutive matches – Fiji

- Streak started 9 August 2016 (defeated Brazil, 40–12)
- Streak ended 27 July 2024 (defeated by France, 28–7)

2 consecutive gold medals at Olympic Games – Fiji

- Streak started 2016 Rio de Janeiro, Brazil
- Streak ended 2024 Paris, France

=== Women's ===
12 consecutive matches – New Zealand

- Streak started 28 July 2021 (defeated Japan, 48–0)

2 consecutive gold medals at Olympic Games – New Zealand

- Streak started 2021 Tokyo, Japan

== Skiing ==
=== Women's Alpine Skiing Combined ===
3 consecutive gold medals at Winter Olympics – Austria

- Streak started 1948 St. Moritz, Switzerland
- Streak ended 1992 Albertville, France

=== Giant Slalom ===
3 consecutive gold medals at Winter Olympics – Austria

- Streak started 1998 Nagano, Japan
- Streak ended 2010 Vancouver, Canada

=== Men's Slalom ===
4 consecutive gold medals at Winter Olympics – Austria

- Streak started 1952 Oslo, Norway
- Streak ended 1968 Grenoble, France

=== Men's Super-G ===
4 consecutive gold medals at Winter Olympics – Norway

- Streak started 2002 Salt Lake City, United States

=== Women's Super-G ===
3 consecutive gold medals at Winter Olympics – Austria

- Streak started 2006 Turin, Italy

== Table Tennis ==
=== Men's Doubles ===
5 consecutive titles at Olympic Games – China

- Streak started 1988 Seoul, South Korea (Inaugural Competition)

Notes: The doubles events were replaced by team events in 2008 Beijing Olympics.

=== Men's Teams ===
3 consecutive titles at Olympic Games – China

- Streak started 2008 Beijing, China (Inaugural Competition)

=== Women's Singles ===
9 consecutive titles at Olympic Games – China

- Streak started 1988 Seoul, South Korea (Inaugural Competition)

=== Women's Doubles ===
4 consecutive titles at Olympic Games – China

- Streak started 1992 Barcelona, Spain

Notes: The doubles events were replaced by team events in 2008 Beijing Olympics.

=== Women's Teams ===
2 consecutive titles at Olympic Games – China

- Streak started 2008 Beijing, China (Inaugural Competition)

== Volleyball ==
=== Women's ===
3 consecutive gold medals at Summer Olympics – Cuba

- Streak started 1992 Barcelona, Spain
- Streak ended 2004 Athens, Greece

=== Women’s Beach ===
3 consecutive gold medals at Summer Olympics - Kerri Walsh Jennings & Misty May-Treanor

- Streak started 2004 Athens, Greece
- * Streak ended 2016 Rio de Janeiro, Brazil

* team disbanded after May-Treanor’s retirement following the 2012 London Olympics.

== Water polo ==
=== Men's ===
3 consecutive gold medals at Summer Olympics

- Great Britain
  - Streak started 1908 London, United Kingdom
  - Streak ended 1924 Paris, France
- Hungary
  - Streak started 2000 Sydney, Australia
  - Streak ended 2012 London, United Kingdom
- Serbia
  - Streak started 2016 Rio de Janeiro, Brazil

=== Women's ===
3 consecutive gold medals at Summer Olympics

- United States
  - Streak started 2012 London, United Kingdom
  - Streak ended 2024 Paris, France

== Weightlifting ==
3 consecutive Olympic gold medals

- Naim Süleymanoğlu
  - Streak started 1988 Seoul, South Korea
  - Streak ended 2000 Sydney, Australia
- Pyrros Dimas
  - Streak started 1992 Barcelona, Spain
  - Streak ended 2004 Athens, Greece
- Kakhi Kakhiashvili
  - Streak started 1992 Barcelona, Spain
  - Streak ended 2004 Athens, Greece
- Halil Mutlu
  - Streak started 1996 Atlanta, United States
  - Streak ended 2008 Beijing, China
- Lasha Talakhadze
  - Streak started 2016 Rio de Janeiro, Brazil

7 consecutive heavyweight Olympic titles – Soviet Union

- Streak started 1960 Rome, Italy
- Streak ended 1992 Barcelona, Spain

Note: excluding boycotted Los Angeles Olympics

6 consecutive super heavyweight Olympic titles – Soviet Union, Unified Team and Russia

- Streak started 1972 Munich, West Germany (Inaugural Competition)
- Streak ended 2000 Sydney, Australia

Note: excluding boycotted Los Angeles Olympics

== Rowing ==
=== Men's Single Sculls ===
3 consecutive gold medals at Olympic Games

- Vyacheslav Ivanov
  - Streak started 1956 Melbourne, Australia
  - Streak ended 1968 Mexico City, Mexico
- Pertti Karppinen
  - Streak started 1976 Montreal, Canada
  - Streak ended 1988 Seoul, South Korea

=== Men's Coxless Pair ===
3 consecutive gold medals at Olympic Games – Steve Redgrave

- Streak started 1988 Seoul, South Korea
- Streak ended 2000 Sydney, Australia

Note: gold medalist in Coxed Four at Los Angeles Olympics (1984) and in Coxless Four at Sydney Olympics.

=== Men's Eights ===
8 consecutive titles at Olympic Games – United States

- Streak started 1920 Antwerp, Belgium
- Streak ended 1960 Rome, Italy

== Wrestling ==
=== Men's Greco-Roman ===
5 consecutive Olympics titles

- Mijaín López
  - Streak started 2008 Beijing, China

=== Men's freestyle ===
3 consecutive Olympics titles (tie)

- Aleksandr Medved
  - Streak started 1964 Tokyo, Japan
  - Streak ended 1972 Munich, West Germany
- Artur Taymazov
  - Streak started 2004 Athens, Greece

187 consecutive matches including 1964 Tokyo Olympics – Osamu Watanabe

Note: The only modern Olympian to go unbeaten throughout his entire career.

6 consecutive Men's heavyweight Olympic titles – USSR

- Streak started 1964 Tokyo, Japan
- Streak ended 1992 Barcelona, Spain

Note: excluding boycotted Los Angeles Olympics

=== Men's Greco-Roman ===
13 years including 3 consecutive Olympics titles (1988–1996) – Alexander Karelin

- Streak started 1988 Seoul, South Korea
- Streak ended 2000 Sydney, Australia

6 years without a single point scored upon – Alexander Karelin

- Streak started 1994
- Streak ended 2000 Sydney, Australia

6 consecutive Men's heavyweight Olympic titles – USSR/Unified Team/Russia

- Streak started 1972 Munich, West Germany
- Streak ended 2000 Sydney, Australia

Note: excluding boycotted Los Angeles Olympics

=== Women's freestyle ===
4 consecutive Olympics titles – Kaori Icho

- Streak started 2004 Athens, Greece
