= 1954–55 Montreal Canadiens season =

NHL hockey team season

1954–55 Montreal Canadiens
- League: 2nd NHL
- 1954–55 record: 41–18–11
- Home record: 26–5–4
- Road record: 15–13–7
- Goals for: 228
- Goals against: 157

Team information
- General manager: Frank J. Selke
- Coach: Dick Irvin
- Captain: Emile Bouchard
- Alternate captains: Maurice Richard; Unknown
- Arena: Montreal Forum

Team leaders
- Goals: Bernie Geoffrion and Maurice Richard (38)
- Assists: Bert Olmstead (48)
- Points: Bernie Geoffrion (75)
- Penalty minutes: Maurice Richard (125)
- Wins: Jacques Plante (33)
- Goals against average: Jacques Plante (2.14)

The 1954–55 Montreal Canadiens season was the Canadiens' 46th season of play. The Canadiens finished in second place in the National Hockey League (NHL) with a record of 41 wins, 18 losses, and 11 ties for 93 points. In the playoffs, they defeated the Boston Bruins in five games in the semi-finals before falling to the Detroit Red Wings in seven games in the Stanley Cup Final.

This season was notable for the suspension of Maurice "Rocket" Richard, Montreal's star player, by NHL president Clarence Campbell after a vicious fight with Boston defenceman Hal Laycoe and Richard punching an on-ice official. The suspension sparked a riot by angry Canadiens fans on March 17, 1955, during a game against the Red Wings (see below).

== Regular season ==
=== The Richard Riot ===
On March 13, 1955, Canadiens star Maurice Richard was involved in a fighting incident in Boston. The Boston Bruins' Hal Laycoe high-sticked Richard and cut him on the head, momentarily leaving Richard dazed and prone on the ice. Richard then got up off the ice and attacked Laycoe, breaking his stick on Laycoe. While linesman Cliff Thompson restrained Richard, Laycoe got up and punched Richard. Richard broke free and punched Thompson in the face. This was Richard's second incident with an official that season and a league disciplinary hearing was held. NHL president Clarence Campbell (who had previously been criticized publicly by Richard) then suspended Richard for the rest of the season and the playoffs; at the time, this was the longest suspension for an on-ice incident in NHL history. The Bruins' Laycoe received no fine or suspension for his actions. Public outrage from Montreal soon poured in, but Campbell stood firm, and moreover announced that he would be attending the Canadiens' next home game against the Detroit Red Wings on March 17.

Midway into the first period, Campbell arrived with his fiancée. Outraged Canadiens fans immediately began pelting them with eggs, vegetables, and various debris, with more being thrown at him each time the Red Wings scored, building up a 4–1 lead on Montreal. The continuous pelting of various objects stopped when a tear gas bomb was set off inside the Montreal Forum not far from where Campbell was sitting. The Forum was ordered evacuated and Campbell ruled the game forfeited to the Red Wings. That was the last straw, as a riot ensued outside the Forum, causing $500,000 in damage to the neighbourhood and the Forum itself. Hundreds of stores were looted and vandalized within a 15-block radius of the Forum. Twelve policemen and 25 civilians were injured. The riot continued well into the night, with police arresting people by the truckload. Local radio stations, which carried live coverage of the riot for over seven hours, had to be forced off the air. The riot was eventually over at 3 am, and left Montreal's Rue Ste-Catherine a mess.

Richard's suspension also cost him the Art Ross Trophy, the closest he ever came to winning it. When Richard's teammate Bernie Geoffrion passed him on the last day of the regular season, he was booed by Montreal faithful. Geoffrion, a right winger, was struggling to gain recognition of his considerable talents because the three leading right wingers of the 1950s were Gordie Howe of the Detroit Red Wings, Andy Bathgate of the New York Rangers, and Richard, Geoffrion's own teammate.

The Canadiens lost the Cup Final to Detroit in seven games, but would win the Cup in the year after, fittingly over the Red Wings — and the next four years in a row after that. Richard retired in 1960 after the Canadiens' fifth straight Stanley Cup, a record that still stands.

=== Final standings ===
National Hockey League
		GP	W	L	T	GF	GA	DIFF	Pts
1	Detroit Red Wings	70	42	17	11	204	134	+70	95
2	Montreal Canadiens	70	41	18	11	228	157	+71	93
3	Toronto Maple Leafs	70	24	24	22	147	135	+12	70
4	Boston Bruins	70	23	26	21	169	188	−19	67
5	New York Rangers	70	17	35	18	150	210	−60	52
6	Chicago Black Hawks	70	13	40	17	161	235	−74	43

=== Record vs. opponents ===
1954–55 NHL Records
Team	BOS	CHI	DET	MTL	NYR	TOR
Boston	—	7–4–3	3–7–4	4–7–3	5–4–5	4–4–6
Chicago	4–7–3	—	1–12–1	0–11–3	5–4–5	3–6–5
Detroit	7–3–4	12–1–1	—	7–7	9–2–3	7–4–3
Montreal	7–4–3	11–0–3	7–7	—	10–3–1	6–4–4
New York	4–5–5	4–5–5	2–9–3	3–10–1	—	4–6–4
Toronto	4–4–6	6–3–5	4–7–3	4–6–4	6–4–4	—

== Schedule and results ==
1954–55 regular season
October

Game	Result	Date	Score	Opponent	Record
1	W	October 7, 1954	4–2	Chicago Black Hawks (1954–55)	1–0–0
2	W	October 9, 1954	4–1	Boston Bruins (1954–55)	2–0–0
3	T	October 11, 1954	2–2	@ Boston Bruins (1954–55)	2–0–1
4	L	October 13, 1954	2–3	Detroit Red Wings (1954–55)	2–1–1
5	W	October 15, 1954	3–0	@ Chicago Black Hawks (1954–55)	3–1–1
6	W	October 16, 1954	3–1	@ Detroit Red Wings (1954–55)	4–1–1
7	L	October 21, 1954	1–3	Toronto Maple Leafs (1954–55)	4–2–1
8	W	October 23, 1954	7–1	New York Rangers (1954–55)	5–2–1
9	L	October 24, 1954	2–4	@ New York Rangers (1954–55)	5–3–1
10	W	October 27, 1954	3–1	@ Toronto Maple Leafs (1954–55)	6–3–1
11	W	October 30, 1954	5–1	Chicago Black Hawks (1954–55)	7–3–1

November

Game	Result	Date	Score	Opponent	Record
12	W	November 6, 1954	4–1	Detroit Red Wings (1954–55)	8–3–1
13	W	November 7, 1954	4–3	@ Boston Bruins (1954–55)	9–3–1
14	W	November 11, 1954	7–4	Chicago Black Hawks (1954–55)	10–3–1
15	W	November 13, 1954	2–1	Boston Bruins (1954–55)	11–3–1
16	L	November 14, 1954	1–4	@ Detroit Red Wings (1954–55)	11–4–1
17	L	November 17, 1954	2–5	@ Toronto Maple Leafs (1954–55)	11–5–1
18	W	November 18, 1954	5–4	Toronto Maple Leafs (1954–55)	12–5–1
19	W	November 20, 1954	4–1	New York Rangers (1954–55)	13–5–1
20	L	November 21, 1954	0–2	@ Boston Bruins (1954–55)	13–6–1
21	T	November 23, 1954	4–4	@ Chicago Black Hawks (1954–55)	13–6–2
22	W	November 25, 1954	3–2	@ Chicago Black Hawks (1954–55)	14–6–2
23	W	November 27, 1954	4–1	Detroit Red Wings (1954–55)	15–6–2
24	L	November 28, 1954	1–4	@ New York Rangers (1954–55)	15–7–2
25	T	November 30, 1954	3–3	@ Chicago Black Hawks (1954–55)	15–7–3

December

Game	Result	Date	Score	Opponent	Record
26	W	December 2, 1954	4–1	@ Detroit Red Wings (1954–55)	16–7–3
27	T	December 5, 1954	3–3	@ New York Rangers (1954–55)	16–7–4
28	L	December 8, 1954	1–3	@ Toronto Maple Leafs (1954–55)	16–8–4
29	W	December 9, 1954	2–0	Toronto Maple Leafs (1954–55)	17–8–4
30	L	December 11, 1954	0–3	Boston Bruins (1954–55)	17–9–4
31	T	December 12, 1954	2–2	@ Boston Bruins (1954–55)	17–9–5
32	W	December 16, 1954	5–1	New York Rangers (1954–55)	18–9–5
33	W	December 18, 1954	4–2	@ Chicago Black Hawks (1954–55)	19–9–5
34	W	December 19, 1954	5–0	@ Detroit Red Wings (1954–55)	20–9–5
35	W	December 25, 1954	4–1	New York Rangers (1954–55)	21–9–5
36	T	December 29, 1954	1–1	@ Toronto Maple Leafs (1954–55)	21–9–6
37	W	December 30, 1954	7–4	Chicago Black Hawks (1954–55)	22–9–6

January

Game	Result	Date	Score	Opponent	Record
38	W	January 1, 1955	4–1	Detroit Red Wings (1954–55)	23–9–6
39	L	January 2, 1955	2–3	@ Detroit Red Wings (1954–55)	23–10–6
40	W	January 6, 1955	6–0	Chicago Black Hawks (1954–55)	24–10–6
41	T	January 8, 1955	1–1	Boston Bruins (1954–55)	24–10–7
42	W	January 9, 1955	7–1	@ New York Rangers (1954–55)	25–10–7
43	L	January 15, 1955	3–4	Detroit Red Wings (1954–55)	25–11–7
44	L	January 16, 1955	0–6	@ Boston Bruins (1954–55)	25–12–7
45	W	January 20, 1955	6–2	Toronto Maple Leafs (1954–55)	26–12–7
46	W	January 22, 1955	5–3	Chicago Black Hawks (1954–55)	27–12–7
47	W	January 23, 1955	5–3	@ Chicago Black Hawks (1954–55)	28–12–7
48	T	January 26, 1955	1–1	@ Toronto Maple Leafs (1954–55)	28–12–8
49	W	January 29, 1955	4–0	Boston Bruins (1954–55)	29–12–8
50	L	January 30, 1955	1–7	@ Detroit Red Wings (1954–55)	29–13–8

February

Game	Result	Date	Score	Opponent	Record
51	W	February 3, 1955	3–2	Toronto Maple Leafs (1954–55)	30–13–8
52	W	February 5, 1955	3–1	New York Rangers (1954–55)	31–13–8
53	W	February 6, 1955	7–3	@ New York Rangers (1954–55)	32–13–8
54	L	February 9, 1955	1–3	@ Toronto Maple Leafs (1954–55)	32–14–8
55	L	February 13, 1955	1–4	@ New York Rangers (1954–55)	32–15–8
56	W	February 17, 1955	4–2	Detroit Red Wings (1954–55)	33–15–8
57	W	February 19, 1955	10–2	New York Rangers (1954–55)	34–15–8
58	T	February 24, 1955	1–1	Toronto Maple Leafs (1954–55)	34–15–9
59	W	February 26, 1955	4–1	Boston Bruins (1954–55)	35–15–9
60	W	February 27, 1955	7–1	@ New York Rangers (1954–55)	36–15–9

March

Game	Result	Date	Score	Opponent	Record
61	W	March 2, 1955	3–2	@ Toronto Maple Leafs (1954–55)	37–15–9
62	W	March 3, 1955	4–1	@ Boston Bruins (1954–55)	38–15–9
63	T	March 5, 1955	4–4	Chicago Black Hawks (1954–55)	38–15–10
64	W	March 6, 1955	4–2	@ Chicago Black Hawks (1954–55)	39–15–10
65	T	March 10, 1955	0–0	Toronto Maple Leafs (1954–55)	39–15–11
66	W	March 12, 1955	2–1	Boston Bruins (1954–55)	40–15–11
67	L	March 13, 1955	2–4	@ Boston Bruins (1954–55)	40–16–11
68^{[a]}	L	March 17, 1955	1–4	Detroit Red Wings (1954–55)	40–17–11
69	W	March 19, 1955	4–2	New York Rangers (1954–55)	41–17–11
70	L	March 20, 1955	0–6	@ Detroit Red Wings (1954–55)	41–18–11
Notes:^{a} Forfeited to Detroit after one period. Goals and assists for the game still counted as official.

Legend: Win (2 points) Loss (0 points) Tie (1 point)

== Playoffs ==
Montreal defeated the Boston Bruins 4–1 to reach the finals.

=== Stanley Cup Final ===
Detroit Red Wings vs. Montreal Canadiens

Date	Away	Score	Home	Score	Notes
April 3	Montreal	2	Detroit	4	
April 5	Montreal	1	Detroit	7	
April 7	Detroit	2	Montreal	6	
April 9	Detroit	3	Montreal	5	
April 10	Montreal	1	Detroit	5	
April 12	Detroit	3	Montreal	6	
April 14	Montreal	1	Detroit	3	

Detroit won the best-of-seven series 4 games to 3.

== Player statistics ==
=== Regular season ===
==== Scoring ====
Player	Pos	GP	G	A	Pts	PIM
Bernie Geoffrion	RW	70	38	37	75	57
Maurice Richard	RW	67	38	36	74	125
Jean Beliveau	C	70	37	36	73	58
Bert Olmstead	LW	70	10	48	58	103
Ken Mosdell	C	70	22	32	54	82
Doug Harvey	D	70	6	43	49	58
Dickie Moore	LW	67	16	20	36	32
Calum MacKay	LW	50	14	21	35	39
Jack LeClair	C	59	11	22	33	12
Tom Johnson	D	70	6	19	25	74
Floyd Curry	RW	68	11	10	21	36
Dollard St. Laurent	D	58	3	14	17	24
Emile Bouchard	D	70	2	15	17	81
Ed Litzenberger	C/RW	29	7	4	11	12
Bud MacPherson	D	30	1	8	9	55
Donnie Marshall	LW	39	5	3	8	9
Eddie Mazur	D/LW	25	1	5	6	21
Paul Meger	LW	13	0	4	4	6
Paul Masnick	C	19	0	1	1	0
Guy Rousseau	LW	2	0	1	1	0
Jean-Guy Talbot	D	3	0	1	1	0
Jim Bartlett	LW	2	0	0	0	4
Andre Binette	G	1	0	0	0	0
Garry Blaine	RW	1	0	0	0	0
Claude Evans	G	4	0	0	0	0
Charlie Hodge	G	14	0	0	0	0
Jean Lamirande	LW/D	1	0	0	0	0
Jacques Plante	G	52	0	0	0	2
Paul Ronty	C	4	0	0	0	2
Orval Tessier	C	4	0	0	0	0

==== Goaltending ====
Player	MIN	GP	W	L	T	GA	GAA	SO
Jacques Plante	3080	52	33	12	7	110	2.14	5
Charlie Hodge	820	14	6	4	4	31	2.27	1
Andre Binette	60	1	1	0	0	4	4.00	0
Claude Evans	200	4	1	2	0	12	3.60	0
Team:	4160	70	41	18	11	157	2.26	6

=== Playoffs ===
==== Scoring ====
Player	Pos	GP	G	A	Pts	PIM
Bernie Geoffrion	RW	12	8	5	13	8
Jean Beliveau	C	12	6	7	13	18
Floyd Curry	RW	12	8	4	12	4
Calum MacKay	LW	12	3	8	11	8
Ken Mosdell	C	12	2	7	9	8
Doug Harvey	D	12	0	8	8	6
Dickie Moore	LW	12	1	5	6	22
Jack LeClair	C	12	5	0	5	2
Dollard St. Laurent	D	12	0	5	5	12
Bert Olmstead	LW	12	0	4	4	21
Tom Johnson	D	12	2	0	2	22
Donnie Marshall	LW	12	1	1	2	2
Emile Bouchard	D	12	0	1	1	37
Jim Bartlett	LW	2	0	0	0	0
Dick Gamble	LW	2	0	0	0	2
Charlie Hodge	G	4	0	0	0	0
George McAvoy	D	4	0	0	0	0
Jacques Plante	G	12	0	0	0	0
Paul Ronty	C	5	0	0	0	2

==== Goaltending ====
Player	MIN	GP	W	L	GA	GAA	SO
Jacques Plante	639	12	6	3	30	2.82	0
Charlie Hodge	84	4	1	2	6	4.29	0
Team:	723	12	7	5	36	2.99	0

Note:

Pos = Position;GP = Games played; G = Goals; A = Assists; Pts = Points; PIM = Penalty minutes; +/- = Plus/minus; PPG = Power-play goals; SHG = Short-handed goals; GWG = Game-winning goals
Pos = Position;GP = Games played; Min, TOI = Minutes played; W = Wins; L = Losses; T,T/OT = Ties; OTL = Overtime losses; GA = Goals-against; GAA = Goals-against average; SO = Shutouts; SA = Shots against; SV = Shots saved;SV% = Save percentage;

== Awards and records ==
- Art Ross Trophy: Bernie Geoffrion
- James Norris Memorial Trophy: Doug Harvey
- Jean Beliveau, Centre, NHL First Team All-Star
- Bernie Geoffrion, Right Wing, NHL Second Team All-Star
- Doug Harvey, Defence, NHL First Team All-Star
- Ken Mosdell, Centre, NHL Second Team All-Star
- Maurice Richard, Right Wing, NHL First Team All-Star

== See also ==
- 1954–55 NHL season
