= List of winning streaks in baseball and softball =

This is a list of longest winning streaks in baseball and softball, not including Major League Baseball (see List of Major League Baseball longest winning streaks).

== Baseball ==
=== World Championships ===
==== World Baseball Classic ====
2 consecutive titles – Japan (2006 and 2009)

==== World Cup ====
9 consecutive titles – Cuba

- Streak started 1984 Havana, Cuba
- Streak ended 2007 Taipei, Taiwan

=== Minor League Baseball ===
29 games – Salt Lake City Trappers of the Pioneer League

- Streak started June 25, 1987 (defeated Pocatello Giants, 12–6)
- Streak ended July 27, 1987 (lost to Billings Mustangs, 5–7)

The Toronto Blue Jays' affiliate in the rookie-level Dominican Summer League, the DSL Blue Jays, claim a 37-game winning streak to begin the 1992 season. The team went on to compile a regular season record of 68–2, then were eliminated in the first round of the postseason.

=== College (United States) ===
==== NCAA Division I ====
34 consecutive games

- Texas
  - Streak started February 18, 1977 (defeated Texas Wesleyan 3–1)
  - Streak ended March 26, 1977 (defeated by Rice 3–4)
- Florida Atlantic
  - Streak started February 19, 1999 (defeated Clemson 3–0)
  - Streak ended March 17, 1999 (defeated by Florida 9–4)

22 consecutive postseason games – South Carolina

- Streak started June 22, 2010 (defeated Arizona State 11–4)
- Streak ended June 19, 2012 (Defeated by Arkansas 2-1 – 2nd-round game in 2012 MCWS)

12 consecutive Men's College World Series games – South Carolina

- Streak started June 22, 2010 (defeated Arizona State 11–4)
- Streak ended June 19, 2012 (Defeated by Arkansas 2-1 – 2nd-round game in 2012 MCWS)

==== NCAA Division II ====
46 games – 2000 Savannah State

==== NCAA Division III ====
44 games – 2008 Trinity College (Connecticut)

44 games - 2026 Denison University

==== NAIA ====
65 games - 2025-26 Louisiana State University Shreveport (All 59 games of the 2025 season and the first six games of the 2026 season)

== Softball ==
=== NCAA ===
==== NCAA Division I ====
71 consecutive games - Oklahoma Softball

- Streak started on February 24, 2023 (defeated Cal State Fullerton, 8-0)
- Reached 25 consecutive wins on April 2, 2023 (defeated Texas, 10-2)
- Reached 50 consecutive wins on June 3, 2023 (defeated Tennessee, 9-0)
- Streak ended on March 3, 2024 (defeated by Louisiana Lafayette, 7-5)

===== Women's College World Series =====
13 consecutive games - UCLA

- Streak started on May 24, 2003 (defeated Louisiana Ragin' Cajuns, 5-1)
- Streak ended on June 7, 2005 in Championship series (defeated by Michigan, 5-2)

==== NCAA Division II ====
55 consecutive games - Northern Kentucky

- Streak started on February 11, 2005 (defeated University of Southern Arkansas, 5-3)
- Streak ended on May 22, 2005 (defeated by Lynn University, 1-0)
  - Lynn's win, national championship and the season were later vacated by the NCAA

==== NCAA Division III ====
53 consecutive games - Tufts University

- Streak started on May 26, 2014 (defeated Salisbury, 6-0)
  - Tufts went 51-0 in the 2015 season, with their last win coming on May 25, 2015 over UT-Tyler, 7-4
- Streak ended on March 19, 2016 (defeated by Whitworth, 6-0)

=== NAIA ===
59 consecutive games - University of Science & Arts of Oklahoma

- Streak started on May 14, 2018 (defeated Oklahoma Wesleyan, 3-0)
- Streak ended on May 5, 2019 (defeated by Oklahoma City University, 1-0)

=== NJCAA ===
88 consecutive games – Butler Community College

- Streak started on March 3, 2016 (defeated Barton Community College, 9-1)
- Streak ended on May 6, 2017 (defeated by Seward County Community College, 6-5)

=== International ===
112 consecutive wins - United States

- Streak started July 29, 1998 (defeated Japan, 4-0)
- Streak ended Sept. 18, 2000 (lost to Japan in Women's World Cup, 2-1 in 11 innings)

==== Women's World Cup ====
7 consecutive World Championships – United States

- Streak started 1986 in Auckland, New Zealand
- Streak ended 2012 Whitehorse, Yukon Territory, Canada (defeated by Japan, 2-1)
