= 1954–55 Chicago Black Hawks season =

NHL ice hockey team season

1954–55 Chicago Black Hawks
- League: 6th NHL
- 1954–55 record: 13–40–17
- Home record: 6–21–8
- Road record: 7–19–9
- Goals for: 161
- Goals against: 235

Team information
- General manager: Tommy Ivan
- Coach: Frank Eddolls
- Captain: Gus Mortson
- Alternate captains: Lee Fogolin; John McCormack; Metro Prystai
- Arena: Chicago Stadium

Team leaders
- Goals: Red Sullivan (19)
- Assists: Red Sullivan (42)
- Points: Red Sullivan (61)
- Penalty minutes: Gord Hollingworth (135)
- Wins: Al Rollins (9)
- Goals against average: Hank Bassen (3.00)

The 1954–55 Chicago Black Hawks season was the team's 29th season in the NHL, and the team was coming off a season in 1953–54 when they set the NHL record for losses in a season with 51, finishing in last place in the NHL, and missing the playoffs for the seventh time in eight seasons. Due to poor attendances at home games, the Blackhawks played eight scheduled games at neutral venues. Six games were played at St Louis, Missouri, one at Omaha, Nebraska, and one game at Saint Paul, Minnesota.

It was a busy off-season for Chicago, as Bill Tobin was replaced by Tommy Ivan as general manager of the club. Ivan had previously been the head coach of the Detroit Red Wings from 1947 to 1954, winning three Stanley Cups with the team. He hired Frank Eddolls to be his head coach, as player-coach Sid Abel was let go after the 1953–54 season. Eddolls had previously been a player-coach of the Buffalo Bisons of the AHL. One of Ivan's first moves as the general manager of the team was to build a farm system, as the Black Hawks were the only team in the NHL without one.

During the season, the Hawks were involved in a number of trades, including acquiring Ed Litzenberger from the Montreal Canadiens, and getting Allan Stanley and Nick Mickoski in a trade with the New York Rangers. The Litzenberger trade paid off immediately, as he was awarded the Calder Memorial Trophy for the best rookie in the league.

It would be another long season in Chicago, with wins few and far between. The team only won consecutive games twice throughout the season, and had numerous losing streaks. The Hawks finished the year with a 13–40–17 record, earning 43 points, which represented a 12-point increase over the previous season; however, the club finished in last place in the league for the second year in a row.

Offensively, Chicago was led by Red Sullivan, whom the team acquired in the off-season. Sullivan scored a team-high 19 goals and 42 assists for 61 points, which ranked him sixth in the NHL. Rookie Ed Litzenberger contributed with 16 goals and 40 points in 44 games with Chicago, while Harry Watson scored 14 goals and 30 points in 43 games before being dealt to the Toronto Maple Leafs. Jack McIntyre led the Hawks blueline with 16 goals and 29 points, while fellow defenceman Allan Stanley scored 10 goals and 25 points in 52 games after being acquired from the New York Rangers. Gord Hollingworth led the Hawks with 135 penalty minutes, while team captain Gus Mortson was right behind him, getting 133.

In goal, Al Rollins played in 44 games, winning a club-high 9 of them, while posting a GAA of 3.39. Backup goaltender Hank Bassen posted a record of 4–9–8, leading the club with a 3.00 GAA.

== Season standings ==
National Hockey League
		GP	W	L	T	GF	GA	DIFF	Pts
1	Detroit Red Wings	70	42	17	11	204	134	+70	95
2	Montreal Canadiens	70	41	18	11	228	157	+71	93
3	Toronto Maple Leafs	70	24	24	22	147	135	+12	70
4	Boston Bruins	70	23	26	21	169	188	−19	67
5	New York Rangers	70	17	35	18	150	210	−60	52
6	Chicago Black Hawks	70	13	40	17	161	235	−74	43

=== Record vs. opponents ===
1954–55 NHL Records
Team	BOS	CHI	DET	MTL	NYR	TOR
Boston	—	7–4–3	3–7–4	4–7–3	5–4–5	4–4–6
Chicago	4–7–3	—	1–12–1	0–11–3	5–4–5	3–6–5
Detroit	7–3–4	12–1–1	—	7–7	9–2–3	7–4–3
Montreal	7–4–3	11–0–3	7–7	—	10–3–1	6–4–4
New York	4–5–5	4–5–5	2–9–3	3–10–1	—	4–6–4
Toronto	4–4–6	6–3–5	4–7–3	4–6–4	6–4–4	—

== Schedule and results ==
1954–55 regular season
October

Game	Date	Visitor	Score	Home	Record	Points
1	October 7	Chicago Black Hawks	2–4	Montreal Canadiens	0–1–0	0
2	October 9	Chicago Black Hawks	3–3	Toronto Maple Leafs	0–1–1	1
3	October 10	New York Rangers	2–1	Chicago Black Hawks	0–2–1	1
4	October 15	Montreal Canadiens	3–0	Chicago Black Hawks	0–3–1	1
5	October 17	Detroit Red Wings	5–2	Chicago Black Hawks	0–4–1	1
6	October 23	Chicago Black Hawks	4–2	Detroit Red Wings	1–4–1	3
7	October 30	Chicago Black Hawks	1–5	Montreal Canadiens	1–5–1	3
8	October 31	Chicago Black Hawks	1–1	New York Rangers	1–5–2	4

November

Game	Date	Visitor	Score	Home	Record	Points
9	November 4	New York Rangers	1–3	Chicago Black Hawks	2–5–2	6
10	November 6	Chicago Black Hawks	2–5	Toronto Maple Leafs	2–6–2	6
11	November 7	Toronto Maple Leafs	2–1	Chicago Black Hawks	2–7–2	6
12	November 10	Chicago Black Hawks	3–4	Boston Bruins	2–8–2	6
13	November 11	Chicago Black Hawks	4–7	Montreal Canadiens	2–9–2	6
14	November 13	Chicago Black Hawks	5–3	New York Rangers	3–9–2	8
15	November 14	New York Rangers	5–0	Chicago Black Hawks	3–10–2	8
16	November 18	Boston Bruins	5–1	Chicago Black Hawks	3–11–2	8
17	November 20	Chicago Black Hawks	0–5	Detroit Red Wings	3–12–2	8
18	November 21	Detroit Red Wings	1–0	Chicago Black Hawks	3–13–2	8
19	November 23	Montreal Canadiens	4–4	Chicago Black Hawks	3–13–3	9
20	November 25	Montreal Canadiens	3–2	Chicago Black Hawks	3–14–3	9
21	November 28	Toronto Maple Leafs	1–1	Chicago Black Hawks	3–14–4	10
22	November 30	Montreal Canadiens	3–3	Chicago Black Hawks	3–14–5	11

December

Game	Date	Visitor	Score	Home	Record	Points
23	December 2	Boston Bruins	3–2	Chicago Black Hawks	3–15–5	11
24	December 5	Chicago Black Hawks	1–4	Detroit Red Wings	3–16–5	11
25	December 8	Chicago Black Hawks	2–1	New York Rangers	4–16–5	13
26	December 9	Chicago Black Hawks	1–2	Boston Bruins	4–17–5	13
27	December 11	Chicago Black Hawks	2–1	Toronto Maple Leafs	5–17–5	15
28	December 12	Detroit Red Wings	4–3	Chicago Black Hawks	5–18–5	15
29	December 15	Toronto Maple Leafs	8–3	Chicago Black Hawks	5–19–5	15
30	December 18	Montreal Canadiens	4–2	Chicago Black Hawks	5–20–5	15
31	December 19	Boston Bruins	1–6	Chicago Black Hawks	6–20–5	17
32	December 25	Chicago Black Hawks	3–3	Boston Bruins	6–20–6	18
33	December 26	Chicago Black Hawks	4–4	New York Rangers	6–20–7	19
34	December 30	Chicago Black Hawks	4–7	Detroit Red Wings	6–21–7	19

January

Game	Date	Visitor	Score	Home	Record	Points
35	January 1	Chicago Black Hawks	2–2	Toronto Maple Leafs	6–21–8	20
36	January 2	Toronto Maple Leafs	2–3	Chicago Black Hawks	7–21–8	22
37	January 5	Chicago Black Hawks	3–2	New York Rangers	8–21–8	24
38	January 6	Chicago Black Hawks	0–6	Montreal Canadiens	8–22–8	24
39	January 8	Chicago Black Hawks	0–1	Detroit Red Wings	8–23–8	24
40	January 9	Detroit Red Wings	6–2	Chicago Black Hawks	8–24–8	24
41	January 12	Boston Bruins	1–1	Chicago Black Hawks	8–24–9	25
42	January 14	New York Rangers	6–2	Chicago Black Hawks	8–25–9	25
43	January 16	Toronto Maple Leafs	4–2	Chicago Black Hawks	8–26–9	25
44	January 19	Chicago Black Hawks	3–3	Toronto Maple Leafs	8–26–10	26
45	January 22	Chicago Black Hawks	3–5	Montreal Canadiens	8–27–10	26
46	January 23	Montreal Canadiens	5–3	Chicago Black Hawks	8–28–10	26
47	January 27	Chicago Black Hawks	2–5	Boston Bruins	8–29–10	26
48	January 29	Detroit Red Wings	2–2	Chicago Black Hawks	8–29–11	27
49	January 30	New York Rangers	2–4	Chicago Black Hawks	9–29–11	29

February

Game	Date	Visitor	Score	Home	Record	Points
50	February 2	Boston Bruins	3–2	Chicago Black Hawks	9–30–11	29
51	February 5	Chicago Black Hawks	2–2	Toronto Maple Leafs	9–30–12	30
52	February 6	Toronto Maple Leafs	4–2	Chicago Black Hawks	9–31–12	30
53	February 9	Chicago Black Hawks	2–2	New York Rangers	9–31–13	31
54	February 10	Chicago Black Hawks	2–4	Boston Bruins	9–32–13	31
55	February 13	Detroit Red Wings	5–1	Chicago Black Hawks	9–33–13	31
56	February 15	Chicago Black Hawks	2–3	Detroit Red Wings	9–34–13	31
57	February 17	Boston Bruins	2–10	Chicago Black Hawks	10–34–13	33
58	February 20	Toronto Maple Leafs	1–4	Chicago Black Hawks	11–34–13	35
59	February 23	Boston Bruins	3–3	Chicago Black Hawks	11–34–14	36
60	February 25	New York Rangers	2–2	Chicago Black Hawks	11–34–15	37
61	February 27	Detroit Red Wings	3–2	Chicago Black Hawks	11–35–15	37

March

Game	Date	Visitor	Score	Home	Record	Points
62	March 3	Chicago Black Hawks	1–6	Detroit Red Wings	11–36–15	37
63	March 5	Chicago Black Hawks	4–4	Montreal Canadiens	11–36–16	38
64	March 6	Montreal Canadiens	4–2	Chicago Black Hawks	11–37–16	38
65	March 10	Chicago Black Hawks	3–2	Boston Bruins	12–37–16	40
66	March 12	Chicago Black Hawks	2–3	Detroit Red Wings	12–38–16	40
67	March 13	Chicago Black Hawks	2–5	New York Rangers	12–39–16	40
68	March 16	New York Rangers	1–1	Chicago Black Hawks	12–39–17	41
69	March 19	Chicago Black Hawks	0–5	Toronto Maple Leafs	12–40–17	41
70	March 20	Chicago Black Hawks	4–3	Boston Bruins	13–40–17	43

Legend: Win (2 points) Loss (0 points) Tie (1 point)

== Season stats ==
=== Scoring leaders ===
Player	GP	G	A	Pts	PIM
Red Sullivan	70	19	42	61	51
Ed Litzenberger	44	16	24	40	28
Harry Watson	43	14	16	30	4
Jack McIntyre	65	16	13	29	40
Nick Mickoski	52	10	19	29	42

=== Goaltending ===
Player	GP	TOI	W	L	T	GA	SO	GAA
Hank Bassen	21	1260	4	9	8	63	0	3.00
Al Rollins	44	2640	9	27	8	150	0	3.41
Ray Frederick	5	300	0	4	1	22	0	4.40

== Sources ==
- Hockey-Reference
- National Hockey League Guide & Record Book 2007
