= 1954–55 Detroit Red Wings season =

Sports season

1954–55 Detroit Red Wings
- Stanley Cup champions
- Prince of Wales Trophy winners
- League: 1st NHL
- 1954–55 record: 42–17–11
- Home record: 25–5–5
- Road record: 17–12–6
- Goals for: 204
- Goals against: 134

Team information
- General manager: Jack Adams
- Coach: Jimmy Skinner
- Captain: Ted Lindsay
- Alternate captains: Red Kelly
- Arena: Detroit Olympia

Team leaders
- Goals: Gordie Howe (29)
- Assists: Earl Reibel (41)
- Points: Earl Reibel (66)
- Penalty minutes: Tony Leswick (137)
- Wins: Terry Sawchuk (40)
- Goals against average: Terry Sawchuk (1.96)

The 1954–55 Detroit Red Wings season saw the Red Wings finish first overall in the National Hockey League (NHL) with a record of 42 wins, 17 losses, and 11 ties for 95 points. They swept the Toronto Maple Leafs in the semifinals and then won the Stanley Cup by defeating the Montreal Canadiens in a seven-game 1955 Stanley Cup Final. The Red Wings would not win another Stanley Cup until 1997.

== Regular season ==
=== Final standings ===
National Hockey League
		GP	W	L	T	GF	GA	DIFF	Pts
1	Detroit Red Wings	70	42	17	11	204	134	+70	95
2	Montreal Canadiens	70	41	18	11	228	157	+71	93
3	Toronto Maple Leafs	70	24	24	22	147	135	+12	70
4	Boston Bruins	70	23	26	21	169	188	−19	67
5	New York Rangers	70	17	35	18	150	210	−60	52
6	Chicago Black Hawks	70	13	40	17	161	235	−74	43

=== Record vs. opponents ===
1954–55 NHL Records
Team	BOS	CHI	DET	MTL	NYR	TOR
Boston	—	7–4–3	3–7–4	4–7–3	5–4–5	4–4–6
Chicago	4–7–3	—	1–12–1	0–11–3	5–4–5	3–6–5
Detroit	7–3–4	12–1–1	—	7–7	9–2–3	7–4–3
Montreal	7–4–3	11–0–3	7–7	—	10–3–1	6–4–4
New York	4–5–5	4–5–5	2–9–3	3–10–1	—	4–6–4
Toronto	4–4–6	6–3–5	4–7–3	4–6–4	6–4–4	—

== Schedule and results ==
1954–55 regular season
October

Game	Result	Date	Score	Opponent	Record
1	W	October 7, 1954	2–1	Toronto Maple Leafs (1954–55)	1–0–0
2	W	October 9, 1954	4–0	New York Rangers (1954–55)	2–0–0
3	W	October 13, 1954	3–2	@ Montreal Canadiens (1954–55)	3–0–0
4	L	October 16, 1954	1–3	Montreal Canadiens (1954–55)	3–1–0
5	W	October 17, 1954	5–2	@ Chicago Black Hawks (1954–55)	4–1–0
6	W	October 21, 1954	5–3	Boston Bruins (1954–55)	5–1–0
7	L	October 23, 1954	2–4	Chicago Black Hawks (1954–55)	5–2–0
8	L	October 27, 1954	2–5	@ New York Rangers (1954–55)	5–3–0
9	W	October 30, 1954	4–0	Boston Bruins (1954–55)	6–3–0

November

Game	Result	Date	Score	Opponent	Record
10	T	November 3, 1954	1–1	@ Toronto Maple Leafs (1954–55)	6–3–1
11	W	November 4, 1954	3–2	@ Boston Bruins (1954–55)	7–3–1
12	L	November 6, 1954	1–4	@ Montreal Canadiens (1954–55)	7–4–1
13	W	November 7, 1954	1–0	New York Rangers (1954–55)	8–4–1
14	L	November 11, 1954	0–1	Toronto Maple Leafs (1954–55)	8–5–1
15	L	November 13, 1954	0–1	@ Toronto Maple Leafs (1954–55)	8–6–1
16	W	November 14, 1954	4–1	Montreal Canadiens (1954–55)	9–6–1
17	W	November 20, 1954	5–0	Chicago Black Hawks (1954–55)	10–6–1
18	W	November 21, 1954	1–0	@ Chicago Black Hawks (1954–55)	11–6–1
19	W	November 25, 1954	2–0	Toronto Maple Leafs (1954–55)	12–6–1
20	L	November 27, 1954	1–4	@ Montreal Canadiens (1954–55)	12–7–1
21	L	November 28, 1954	2–6	@ Boston Bruins (1954–55)	12–8–1

December

Game	Result	Date	Score	Opponent	Record
22	W	December 1, 1954	6–1	@ New York Rangers (1954–55)	13–8–1
23	L	December 2, 1954	1–4	Montreal Canadiens (1954–55)	13–9–1
24	L	December 4, 1954	0–1	@ Toronto Maple Leafs (1954–55)	13–10–1
25	W	December 5, 1954	4–1	Chicago Black Hawks (1954–55)	14–10–1
26	W	December 9, 1954	3–2	New York Rangers (1954–55)	15–10–1
27	W	December 11, 1954	4–1	New York Rangers (1954–55)	16–10–1
28	W	December 12, 1954	4–3	@ Chicago Black Hawks (1954–55)	17–10–1
29	T	December 15, 1954	3–3	@ New York Rangers (1954–55)	17–10–2
30	W	December 16, 1954	4–2	@ Boston Bruins (1954–55)	18–10–2
31	W	December 18, 1954	4–1	Boston Bruins (1954–55)	19–10–2
32	L	December 19, 1954	0–5	Montreal Canadiens (1954–55)	19–11–2
33	T	December 22, 1954	2–2	@ New York Rangers (1954–55)	19–11–3
34	W	December 25, 1954	3–2	@ Toronto Maple Leafs (1954–55)	20–11–3
35	T	December 26, 1954	1–1	Toronto Maple Leafs (1954–55)	20–11–4
36	W	December 30, 1954	4–1	Toronto Maple Leafs (1954–55)	21–11–4

January

Game	Result	Date	Score	Opponent	Record
37	L	January 1, 1955	1–4	@ Montreal Canadiens (1954–55)	21–12–4
38	W	January 2, 1955	3–2	Montreal Canadiens (1954–55)	22–12–4
39	T	January 6, 1955	3–3	Boston Bruins (1954–55)	22–12–5
40	W	January 8, 1955	1–0	Chicago Black Hawks (1954–55)	23–12–5
41	W	January 9, 1955	6–2	@ Chicago Black Hawks (1954–55)	24–12–5
42	W	January 13, 1955	4–0	Boston Bruins (1954–55)	25–12–5
43	W	January 15, 1955	4–3	@ Montreal Canadiens (1954–55)	26–12–5
44	W	January 16, 1955	3–0	New York Rangers (1954–55)	27–12–5
45	L	January 19, 1955	0–2	@ New York Rangers (1954–55)	27–13–5
46	L	January 20, 1955	2–3	@ Boston Bruins (1954–55)	27–14–5
47	L	January 22, 1955	1–3	@ Toronto Maple Leafs (1954–55)	27–15–5
48	W	January 23, 1955	4–0	Toronto Maple Leafs (1954–55)	28–15–5
49	T	January 27, 1955	3–3	New York Rangers (1954–55)	28–15–6
50	T	January 29, 1955	2–2	@ Chicago Black Hawks (1954–55)	28–15–7
51	W	January 30, 1955	7–1	Montreal Canadiens (1954–55)	29–15–7

February

Game	Result	Date	Score	Opponent	Record
52	T	February 3, 1955	1–1	Boston Bruins (1954–55)	29–15–8
53	L	February 5, 1955	4–8	@ Boston Bruins (1954–55)	29–16–8
54	T	February 6, 1955	2–2	@ Boston Bruins (1954–55)	29–16–9
55	W	February 12, 1955	2–1	@ Toronto Maple Leafs (1954–55)	30–16–9
56	W	February 13, 1955	5–1	@ Chicago Black Hawks (1954–55)	31–16–9
57	W	February 15, 1955	3–2	Chicago Black Hawks (1954–55)	32–16–9
58	L	February 17, 1955	2–4	@ Montreal Canadiens (1954–55)	32–17–9
59	W	February 20, 1955	5–0	@ New York Rangers (1954–55)	33–17–9
60	T	February 21, 1955	2–2	Boston Bruins (1954–55)	33–17–10
61	T	February 26, 1955	1–1	@ Toronto Maple Leafs (1954–55)	33–17–11
62	W	February 27, 1955	3–2	@ Chicago Black Hawks (1954–55)	34–17–11

March

Game	Result	Date	Score	Opponent	Record
63	W	March 3, 1955	6–1	Chicago Black Hawks (1954–55)	35–17–11
64	W	March 5, 1955	6–2	New York Rangers (1954–55)	36–17–11
65	W	March 6, 1955	2–1	@ New York Rangers (1954–55)	37–17–11
66	W	March 12, 1955	3–2	Chicago Black Hawks (1954–55)	38–17–11
67	W	March 13, 1955	6–1	Toronto Maple Leafs (1954–55)	39–17–11
68	W	March 16, 1955	5–4	@ Boston Bruins (1954–55)	40–17–11
69	W	March 17, 1955	4–1	@ Montreal Canadiens (1954–55)	41–17–11
70	W	March 20, 1955	6–0	Montreal Canadiens (1954–55)	42–17–11

Legend: Win (2 points) Loss (0 points) Tie (1 point)

== Playoffs ==
=== Stanley Cup Final ===
Date	Away	Score	Home	Score
April 3	Montreal	2	Detroit	4
April 5	Montreal	1	Detroit	7
April 7	Detroit	2	Montreal	6
April 9	Detroit	3	Montreal	5
April 10	Montreal	1	Detroit	5
April 12	Detroit	3	Montreal	6
April 14	Montreal	1	Detroit	3

Detroit wins best-of-seven series 4 games to 3

== Player statistics ==
=== Forwards ===
Note: GP = Games played; G = Goals; A = Assists; Pts = Points; PIM = Penalty minutes

Player	GP	G	A	Pts	PIM
Earl Reibel	70	25	41	66	15
Gordie Howe	64	29	33	62	68
Alex Delvecchio	69	17	31	48	37
Ted Lindsay	49	19	19	38	85
Marcel Bonin	69	16	20	36	53
Marty Pavelich	70	15	15	30	59
Glen Skov	70	14	16	30	53
Johnny Wilson	70	12	15	27	14
Tony Leswick	70	10	17	27	137
Vic Stasiuk	59	8	11	19	67
Bill Dineen	69	10	9	19	36
Metro Prystai	12	2	3	5	9
Benny Woit	62	2	3	5	22
Lorne Davis	22	0	5	5	2
Don Poile	4	0	0	0	0

=== Defensemen ===
Note: GP = Games played; G = Goals; A = Assists; Pts = Points; PIM = Penalty minutes

Player	GP	G	A	Pts	PIM
Red Kelly	70	15	30	45	28
Marcel Pronovost	70	9	25	34	90
Bob Goldham	69	1	16	17	14
Jim Hay	21	0	1	1	20
Larry Hillman	6	0	0	0	2
Keith Allen	18	0	0	0	6
Ed Zeniuk	2	0	0	0	0

=== Goaltending ===
Note: GP = Games played; W = Wins; L = Losses; T = Ties; SO = Shutouts; GAA = Goals against average

Player	GP	W	L	T	SO	GAA
Terry Sawchuk	68	40	17	11	12	1.96
Glenn Hall	2	2	0	0	0	1.00

== Awards and records ==
- Prince of Wales Trophy: Detroit Red Wings
- Vezina Trophy: Terry Sawchuk, Detroit Red Wings
- Bob Goldham, Defense, NHL Second Team All-Star
- Red Kelly, Defense, NHL First Team All-Star
- Terry Sawchuk, Goaltender, NHL Second Team All-Star
