= 1954–55 New York Rangers season =

NHL hockey team season

1954–55 New York Rangers
- League: 5th NHL
- 1954–55 record: 17–35–18
- Home record: 10–12–3
- Road record: 7–23–5
- Goals for: 150
- Goals against: 210

Team information
- General manager: Frank Boucher
- Coach: Muzz Patrick
- Captain: Don Raleigh
- Arena: Madison Square Garden

Team leaders
- Goals: Danny Lewicki (29)
- Assists: Don Raleigh (32)
- Points: Danny Lewicki (53)
- Penalty minutes: Jack Evans (91)
- Wins: Gump Worsley (15)
- Goals against average: Johnny Bower (2.60)

The 1954–55 New York Rangers season was the franchise's 29th season. The season saw the Rangers finish in fifth place in the National Hockey League with a record of 17 wins, 35 losses, and 18 ties for 52 points, and miss the playoffs for the fifth year in a row for the first time since the 1944–45 season and the 1946–47 season.

== Regular season ==
=== Final standings ===
National Hockey League
		GP	W	L	T	GF	GA	DIFF	Pts
1	Detroit Red Wings	70	42	17	11	204	134	+70	95
2	Montreal Canadiens	70	41	18	11	228	157	+71	93
3	Toronto Maple Leafs	70	24	24	22	147	135	+12	70
4	Boston Bruins	70	23	26	21	169	188	−19	67
5	New York Rangers	70	17	35	18	150	210	−60	52
6	Chicago Black Hawks	70	13	40	17	161	235	−74	43

=== Record vs. opponents ===
1954–55 NHL Records
Team	BOS	CHI	DET	MTL	NYR	TOR
Boston	—	7–4–3	3–7–4	4–7–3	5–4–5	4–4–6
Chicago	4–7–3	—	1–12–1	0–11–3	5–4–5	3–6–5
Detroit	7–3–4	12–1–1	—	7–7	9–2–3	7–4–3
Montreal	7–4–3	11–0–3	7–7	—	10–3–1	6–4–4
New York	4–5–5	4–5–5	2–9–3	3–10–1	—	4–6–4
Toronto	4–4–6	6–3–5	4–7–3	4–6–4	6–4–4	—

== Schedule and results ==
1954–55 regular season
October: 5–4–1 (home: 3–0–1; road: 2–4–0)

Game	October	Opponent	Score	Record
1	9	@ Detroit Red Wings	4–0	0–1–0
2	10	@ Chicago Black Hawks	2–1	1–1–0
3	14	@ Boston Bruins	5–3	1–2–0
4	16	@ Toronto Maple Leafs	4–2	2–2–0
5	20	Boston Bruins	6–2	3–2–0
6	23	@ Montreal Canadiens	7–1	3–3–0
7	24	Montreal Canadiens	4–2	4–3–0
8	27	Detroit Red Wings	5–2	5–3–0
9	30	@ Toronto Maple Leafs	3–1	5–4–0
10	31	Chicago Black Hawks	1–1	5–4–1

November: 3–6–3 (home: 2–2–2; road: 1–4–2)

Game	November	Opponent	Score	Record
11	4	@ Chicago Black Hawks	3–1	5–5–1
12	7	@ Detroit Red Wings	1–0	5–6–1
13	10	Toronto Maple Leafs	2–1	5–7–1
14	13	Chicago Black Hawks	5–3	5–8–1
15	14	@ Chicago Black Hawks	5–0	6–8–1
16	17	Boston Bruins	2–2	6–8–2
17	20	@ Montreal Canadiens	4–1	6–9–2
18	21	Toronto Maple Leafs	2–2	6–9–3
19	24	Boston Bruins	3–1	7–9–3
20	25	@ Boston Bruins	2–2	7–9–4
21	27	@ Toronto Maple Leafs	3–1	7–10–4
22	28	Montreal Canadiens	4–1	8–10–4

December: 1–8–6 (home: 1–2–6; road: 0–6–0)

Game	December	Opponent	Score	Record
23	1	Detroit Red Wings	6–1	8–11–4
24	4	@ Boston Bruins	6–3	8–12–4
25	5	Montreal Canadiens	3–3	8–12–5
26	8	Chicago Black Hawks	2–1	8–13–5
27	9	@ Detroit Red Wings	3–2	8–14–5
28	11	@ Detroit Red Wings	4–1	8–15–5
29	12	Toronto Maple Leafs	1–1	8–15–6
30	15	Detroit Red Wings	3–3	8–15–7
31	16	@ Montreal Canadiens	5–1	8–16–7
32	18	@ Toronto Maple Leafs	3–1	8–17–7
33	19	Toronto Maple Leafs	3–3	8–17–8
34	22	Detroit Red Wings	2–2	8–17–9
35	25	@ Montreal Canadiens	4–1	8–18–9
36	26	Chicago Black Hawks	4–4	8–18–10
37	30	Boston Bruins	6–1	9–18–10

January: 4–7–3 (home: 1–2–2; road: 3–5–1)

Game	January	Opponent	Score	Record
38	1	@ Boston Bruins	4–0	9–19–10
39	2	Boston Bruins	3–3	9–19–11
40	5	Chicago Black Hawks	3–2	9–20–11
41	8	@ Toronto Maple Leafs	5–0	9–21–11
42	9	Montreal Canadiens	7–1	9–22–11
43	12	Toronto Maple Leafs	0–0	9–22–12
44	14	@ Chicago Black Hawks	6–2	10–22–12
45	16	@ Detroit Red Wings	3–0	10–23–12
46	19	Detroit Red Wings	2–0	11–23–12
47	22	@ Boston Bruins	3–1	11–24–12
48	23	@ Boston Bruins	2–0	12–24–12
49	27	@ Detroit Red Wings	3–3	12–24–13
50	29	@ Toronto Maple Leafs	3–1	13–24–13
51	30	@ Chicago Black Hawks	4–2	13–25–13

February: 1–6–4 (home: 1–4–2; road: 0–2–2)

Game	February	Opponent	Score	Record
52	5	@ Montreal Canadiens	3–1	13–26–13
53	6	Montreal Canadiens	7–3	13–27–13
54	9	Chicago Black Hawks	2–2	13–27–14
55	12	@ Boston Bruins	5–5	13–27–15
56	13	Montreal Canadiens	4–1	14–27–15
57	16	Boston Bruins	2–2	14–27–16
58	19	@ Montreal Canadiens	10–2	14–28–16
59	20	Detroit Red Wings	5–0	14–29–16
60	23	Toronto Maple Leafs	3–1	14–30–16
61	25	@ Chicago Black Hawks	2–2	14–30–17
62	27	Montreal Canadiens	7–1	14–31–17

March: 3–4–1 (home: 2–2–0; road: 1–2–1)

Game	March	Opponent	Score	Record
63	2	Boston Bruins	2–1	14–32–17
64	5	@ Detroit Red Wings	6–2	14–33–17
65	6	Detroit Red Wings	2–1	14–34–17
66	12	@ Toronto Maple Leafs	2–1	15–34–17
67	13	Chicago Black Hawks	5–2	16–34–17
68	16	@ Chicago Black Hawks	1–1	16–34–18
69	19	@ Montreal Canadiens	4–2	16–35–18
70	20	Toronto Maple Leafs	3–2	17–35–18

Legend: Win (2 points) Loss (0 points) Tie (1 point)

== Player statistics ==
Skaters

Regular season
Player	GP	G	A	Pts	PIM
Danny Lewicki	70	29	24	53	8
Andy Bathgate	70	20	20	40	37
Don Raleigh	69	8	32	40	19
Dean Prentice	70	16	15	31	20
Ron Murphy	66	14	16	30	36
Larry Popein	70	11	17	28	27
Pete Conacher^{†}	52	10	7	17	10
Bill Gadsby^{†}	52	8	8	16	44
Harry Howell	70	2	14	16	87
Bob Chrystal	68	6	9	15	68
Paul Ronty^{‡}	54	4	11	15	10
Nick Mickoski^{‡}	18	1	14	15	6
Edgar Laprade	60	3	11	14	0
Ivan Irwin	60	0	13	13	85
Camille Henry	21	5	2	7	4
Aldo Guidolin	70	2	5	7	34
Wally Hergesheimer	14	4	2	6	4
Vic Howe	29	2	4	6	10
Jack Evans	47	0	5	5	91
Bill Ezinicki	16	2	2	4	22
Lou Fontinato	28	2	2	4	60
Jackie McLeod	11	1	1	2	2
Bill McCreary	8	0	2	2	0
Allan Stanley^{‡}	12	0	1	1	2
Dick Bouchard	1	0	0	0	0
Ron Howell	3	0	0	0	0
Glen Sonmor	13	0	0	0	4

Goaltenders

Regular season
Player	GP	TOI	W	L	T	GA	GAA	SA	SV%	SO
Lorne Worsley	65	3900	15	33	17	195	3.00	2312	.916	4
Johnny Bower	5	300	2	2	1	13	2.60	156	.917	0

^{†}Denotes player spent time with another team before joining Rangers. Stats reflect time with Rangers only.
^{‡}Traded mid-season. Stats reflect time with Rangers only.

Note:

Pos = Position;GP = Games played; G = Goals; A = Assists; Pts = Points; PIM = Penalty minutes; +/- = Plus/minus; PPG = Power-play goals; SHG = Short-handed goals; GWG = Game-winning goals
Pos = Position;GP = Games played; Min, TOI = Minutes played; W = Wins; L = Losses; T,T/OT = Ties; OTL = Overtime losses; GA = Goals-against; GAA = Goals-against average; SO = Shutouts; SA = Shots against; SV = Shots saved;SV% = Save percentage;

== Awards and records ==
- Danny Lewicki, left wing, NHL Second Team All-Star
