= Ed Zeniuk =

Canadian ice hockey player (1933–1996)

- Born: March 8, 1933; Landis, Saskatchewan, Canada
- Died: April 14, 1996 (aged 63)
- Height: 5 ft 11 in (180 cm)
- Weight: 180 lb (82 kg; 12 st 12 lb)
- Position: Defence
- Shot: Left
- Played for: Detroit Red Wings
- Playing career: 1953–1956

Edward William Zeniuk (March 8, 1933 – April 14, 1996) was a Canadian professional ice hockey defenceman who played in two games in the National Hockey League Detroit Red Wings during the 1954–55 season. He was born in Landis, Saskatchewan.

== Professional career ==
Zeniuk started play with the Edmonton Poolers of the Edmonton Junior Hockey League in 1950. He showed promise and was brought up to spend the following two seasons with the Edmonton Oil Kings of the Western Canada Junior Hockey League. Known more for his defensive play, he still managed to score five goals and finish his first season with 21 points. He continued his strong play the following season and was called up to the WHL. He played one season with both the Edmonton Flyers and the Seattle Bombers.

Filling in for injury, Zeniuk was finally promoted to the NHL in the 1954–55 season. He failed to record a point in two games and was sent back down to the minors. The Detroit Red Wings would go on to win the Stanley Cup that year.

Zeniuk continued play with the Edmonton Flyers where he spent the remainder of the 1954–55 season. For the 1955–56 season, Zedniuk began play with the New Westminster Royals before ending his season and career as a member of the Quebec Aces of the Quebec Hockey League.

== Career statistics ==
=== Regular season and playoffs ===
			Regular season					Playoffs
Season	Team	League	GP	G	A	Pts	PIM	GP	G	A	Pts	PIM
1950–51	Edmonton Poolers	EJrHL	—	—	—	—	—	—	—	—	—	—
1950–51	Edmonton Oil Kings	M-Cup	—	—	—	—	—	6	0	2	2	4
1951–52	Edmonton Oil Kings	WCJHL	43	5	16	21	110	9	1	4	5	32
1952–53	Edmonton Oil Kings	WCJHL	30	3	8	11	104	11	0	1	1	22
1953–54	Seattle Bombers	WHL	—	—	—	—	—	—	—	—	—	—
1953–54	Edmonton Flyers	WHL	—	—	—	—	—	4	0	0	0	2
1954–55	Detroit Red Wings	NHL	2	0	0	0	0	—	—	—	—	—
1954–55	Edmonton Flyers	WHL	52	2	7	9	88	9	0	0	0	6
1955–56	New Westminster Royals	WHL	14	1	3	4	31	—	—	—	—	—
1955–56	Quebec Aces	QHL	26	0	4	4	54	6	0	0	0	10
WHL totals			71	3	10	13	119	13	0	0	0	8
NHL totals			2	0	0	0	0	—	—	—	—	—
