= 1944–45 Boston Bruins season =

NHL team season

1944–45 Boston Bruins
- League: 4th NHL
- 1944–45 record: 16–30–4
- Home record: 11–12–2
- Road record: 5–18–2
- Goals for: 179
- Goals against: 219

Team information
- General manager: Art Ross
- Coach: Art Ross
- Captain: Bill Cowley
- Arena: Boston Garden

Team leaders
- Goals: Herb Cain (32)
- Assists: Bill Cowley (40)
- Points: Bill Cowley (65)
- Penalty minutes: Pat Egan (86)
- Wins: Harvey Bennett Sr. (20)
- Goals against average: Harvey Bennett Sr. (4.20)

The 1944–45 Boston Bruins season was the Bruins' 21st season in the NHL.

== Regular season ==
=== Final standings ===
National Hockey League
		GP	W	L	T	GF	GA	DIFF	Pts
1	Montreal Canadiens	50	38	8	4	228	121	+107	80
2	Detroit Red Wings	50	31	14	5	218	161	+57	67
3	Toronto Maple Leafs	50	24	22	4	183	161	+22	52
4	Boston Bruins	50	16	30	4	179	219	−40	36
5	Chicago Black Hawks	50	13	30	7	141	194	−53	33
6	New York Rangers	50	11	29	10	154	247	−93	32

=== Record vs. opponents ===
1944–45 NHL Records
Team	BOS	CHI	DET	MTL	NYR	TOR
Boston	—	7–3	0–9–1	0–10	4–3–3	5–5
Chicago	5–5	—	5–5	0–8–2	7–1–2	5–4–1
Detroit	9–0–1	7–3	—	1–8–1	6–2–2	8–1–1
Montreal	10–0	7–1–2	8–1–1	—	9–1	4–5–1
New York	3–4–3	3–3–4	2–6–2	1–9	—	2–7–1
Toronto	5–5	6–3–1	1–8–1	5–4–1	7–2–1	—

== Schedule and results ==
1944–45 regular season
October

Game	Result	Date	Score	Opponent	Record
1	L	October 28, 1944	2–3	@ Montreal Canadiens (1944–45)	0–1–0
2	L	October 29, 1944	1–7	@ Detroit Red Wings (1944–45)	0–2–0

November

Game	Result	Date	Score	Opponent	Record
3	L	November 4, 1944	2–7	@ Toronto Maple Leafs (1944–45)	0–3–0
4	W	November 5, 1944	6–3	@ Chicago Black Hawks (1944–45)	1–3–0
5	T	November 12, 1944	5–5	@ New York Rangers (1944–45)	1–3–1
6	W	November 14, 1944	7–5	Chicago Black Hawks (1944–45)	2–3–1
7	L	November 18, 1944	3–6	@ Montreal Canadiens (1944–45)	2–4–1
8	L	November 19, 1944	3–4	@ Detroit Red Wings (1944–45)	2–5–1
9	L	November 21, 1944	1–4	Montreal Canadiens (1944–45)	2–6–1
10	W	November 23, 1944	5–1	Toronto Maple Leafs (1944–45)	3–6–1
11	W	November 26, 1944	8–4	New York Rangers (1944–45)	4–6–1
12	L	November 28, 1944	3–6	Detroit Red Wings (1944–45)	4–7–1
13	W	November 30, 1944	7–2	@ Chicago Black Hawks (1944–45)	5–7–1

December

Game	Result	Date	Score	Opponent	Record
14	W	December 3, 1944	5–4	Toronto Maple Leafs (1944–45)	6–7–1
15	L	December 5, 1944	1–4	Montreal Canadiens (1944–45)	6–8–1
16	W	December 9, 1944	5–3	@ Toronto Maple Leafs (1944–45)	7–8–1
17	L	December 10, 1944	6–7	@ Detroit Red Wings (1944–45)	7–9–1
18	W	December 12, 1944	7–5	New York Rangers (1944–45)	8–9–1
19	L	December 16, 1944	5–8	@ Montreal Canadiens (1944–45)	8–10–1
20	L	December 19, 1944	3–6	Detroit Red Wings (1944–45)	8–11–1
21	W	December 28, 1944	2–1	Chicago Black Hawks (1944–45)	9–11–1
22	L	December 31, 1944	2–3	@ New York Rangers (1944–45)	9–12–1

January

Game	Result	Date	Score	Opponent	Record
23	L	January 2, 1945	3–6	Montreal Canadiens (1944–45)	9–13–1
24	L	January 7, 1945	4–8	@ Detroit Red Wings (1944–45)	9–14–1
25	L	January 11, 1945	1–5	@ New York Rangers (1944–45)	9–15–1
26	L	January 13, 1945	1–2	@ Toronto Maple Leafs (1944–45)	9–16–1
27	L	January 14, 1945	1–4	@ Chicago Black Hawks (1944–45)	9–17–1
28	W	January 16, 1945	5–3	Toronto Maple Leafs (1944–45)	10–17–1
29	W	January 21, 1945	14–3	New York Rangers (1944–45)	11–17–1
30	L	January 23, 1945	4–5	Detroit Red Wings (1944–45)	11–18–1
31	L	January 27, 1945	3–11	@ Montreal Canadiens (1944–45)	11–19–1
32	L	January 28, 1945	1–4	Montreal Canadiens (1944–45)	11–20–1
33	L	January 30, 1945	3–5	Chicago Black Hawks (1944–45)	11–21–1

February

Game	Result	Date	Score	Opponent	Record
34	W	February 3, 1945	4–2	@ Toronto Maple Leafs (1944–45)	12–21–1
35	T	February 4, 1945	3–3	New York Rangers (1944–45)	12–21–2
36	L	February 6, 1945	1–5	Toronto Maple Leafs (1944–45)	12–22–2
37	L	February 11, 1945	2–3	Detroit Red Wings (1944–45)	12–23–2
38	W	February 13, 1945	3–2	Chicago Black Hawks (1944–45)	13–23–2
39	W	February 17, 1945	6–1	New York Rangers (1944–45)	14–23–2
40	L	February 18, 1945	1–2	@ New York Rangers (1944–45)	14–24–2
41	L	February 21, 1945	0–5	@ Chicago Black Hawks (1944–45)	14–25–2
42	T	February 25, 1945	4–4	@ New York Rangers (1944–45)	14–25–3

March

Game	Result	Date	Score	Opponent	Record
43	L	March 4, 1945	4–10	@ Detroit Red Wings (1944–45)	14–26–3
44	L	March 6, 1945	2–5	Toronto Maple Leafs (1944–45)	14–27–3
45	L	March 8, 1945	2–3	@ Montreal Canadiens (1944–45)	14–28–3
46	L	March 10, 1945	2–9	@ Toronto Maple Leafs (1944–45)	14–29–3
47	W	March 11, 1945	7–2	Chicago Black Hawks (1944–45)	15–29–3
48	T	March 13, 1945	2–2	Detroit Red Wings (1944–45)	15–29–4
49	W	March 15, 1945	5–3	@ Chicago Black Hawks (1944–45)	16–29–4
50	L	March 18, 1945	2–4	Montreal Canadiens (1944–45)	16–30–4

Legend: Win (2 points) Loss (0 points) Tie (1 point)

== Playoffs ==
The Detroit Red Wings finished second in the league with 67 points. The Boston Bruins finished fourth with 36 points. This was the fourth playoff meeting between these two teams with Detroit winning two of the three previous series. They last met in the 1943 Stanley Cup Finals where the Red Wings won in four games. Detroit won this season's ten-game regular-season series earning nineteen of twenty points.

March 20	Boston Bruins	4–3	Detroit Red Wings	Olympia Stadium	Recap
Bill Cowley (1) – 06:20; Bill Cupolo (1) – 10:07; Herb Cain (1) – 14:04		First period	No scoring
No scoring		Second period	No scoring
Jack McGill (1) – 07:22		Third period	04:04 – Earl Seibert (1); 09:05 – Joe Carveth (1); 19:04 – Eddie Bruneteau (1)
Paul Bibeault		Goalie stats	Harry Lumley

March 22	Boston Bruins	4–2	Detroit Red Wings	Olympia Stadium	Recap
Jack McGill (2) – 02:46		First period	No scoring
Ken Smith (1) – 10:03; Jean-Paul Gladu (1) – 10:18		Second period	08:25 – Harold Jackson (1)
Pat Egan (1) – 17:05		Third period	12:48 – Eddie Bruneteau (2)
Paul Bibeault		Goalie stats	Harry Lumley

March 24	Detroit Red Wings	3–2	Boston Bruins	Boston Garden	Recap
Ted Lindsay (1) – 18:54; Murray Armstrong (1) – 19:35		First period	No scoring
No scoring		Second period	16:05 – Pat Egan (2)
Mud Bruneteau (1) – 15:48		Third period	17:57 – Gino Rozzini (1)
Harry Lumley		Goalie stats	Paul Bibeault

March 27	Detroit Red Wings	3–2	Boston Bruins	Boston Garden	Recap
Earl Seibert (2) – 17:21		First period	08:31 – Ken Smith (2)
No scoring		Second period	14:38 – Herb Cain (2)
Joe Carveth (2) – 05:10; Murray Armstrong (2) – 17:15		Third period	No scoring
Harry Lumley		Goalie stats	Paul Bibeault

March 29	Boston Bruins	2–3	OT	Detroit Red Wings	Olympia Stadium	Recap
Herb Cain (3) – 11:52		First period		02:51 – Mud Bruneteau (2); 11:41 – Flash Hollett (1)
No scoring		Second period		No scoring
Bill Jennings (1) – pp – 17:00		Third period		No scoring
No scoring		First overtime period		17:12 – Mud Bruneteau (3)
Paul Bibeault		Goalie stats		Harry Lumley

April 1	Detroit Red Wings	3–5	Boston Bruins	Boston Garden	Recap
Jud McAtee (1) – 00:45		First period	12:54 – Bill Cowley (2)
Joe Carveth (3) – 03:24; Jud McAtee (2) – 17:12		Second period	06:24 – Bill Jennings (2); 07:33 – pp – Herb Cain (4); 10:38 – Jean-Paul Gladu (2)
No scoring		Third period	09:25 – Bill Cowley (3)
Harry Lumley		Goalie stats	Paul Bibeault

April 3	Boston Bruins	3–5	Detroit Red Wings	Olympia Stadium	Recap
Jack McGill (3) – 19:15		First period	08:20 – pp – Carl Liscombe (1)
Herb Cain (5) – 08:50; Ken Smith (3) – 19:39		Second period	03:51 – Carl Liscombe (2)
No scoring		Third period	02:01 – Eddie Bruneteau (3); 04:09 – Carl Liscombe (3); 19:54 – Carl Liscombe (4)
Paul Bibeault		Goalie stats	Harry Lumley

Detroit won series 4–3

== Player statistics ==
=== Regular season ===
Scoring

Player	Pos	GP	G	A	Pts	PIM
Bill Cowley	C	49	25	40	65	12
Herb Cain	LW	50	32	13	45	16
Ken Smith	LW	49	20	14	34	2
Bill Jennings	RW	39	20	13	33	25
Frank Mario	C	44	8	18	26	24
Armand Gaudreault	LW	44	15	9	24	27
Bill Cupolo	RW	47	11	13	24	10
Jack Crawford	D	40	5	19	24	10
Dit Clapper	RW/D	46	8	14	22	16
Pat Egan	D	48	7	15	22	86
Jean-Paul Gladu	LW	40	6	14	20	2
Gino Rozzini	C	31	5	10	15	20
Art Jackson	C	19	5	8	13	10
Jack Shewchuk	D	47	1	7	8	31
Jack McGill	C	14	4	2	6	0
Bill Thoms	C	17	4	2	6	0
Norm Calladine	C	11	3	1	4	0
Tom Brennan	RW	1	0	1	1	0
Murray Henderson	D	5	0	1	1	4
Harvey Bennett	G	25	0	0	0	0
Paul Bibeault	G	26	0	0	0	0
Marcel Fillion	LW	1	0	0	0	0
Fern Flaman	D	1	0	0	0	0
Pete Leswick	W	2	0	0	0	0

Goaltending

Player	MIN	GP	W	L	T	GA	GAA	SO
Harvey Bennett	1470	25	10	12	2	103	4.20	0
Paul Bibeault	1530	26	6	18	2	116	4.55	0
Team:	3000	50	16	30	4	219	4.38	0

=== Playoffs ===
Scoring

Player	Pos	GP	G	A	Pts	PIM
Herb Cain	LW	7	5	2	7	0
Ken Smith	LW	7	3	4	7	0
Bill Cowley	C	7	3	3	6	0
Jack McGill	C	7	3	3	6	0
Jack Crawford	D	7	0	5	5	0
Jean-Paul Gladu	LW	7	2	2	4	0
Bill Jennings	RW	7	2	2	4	6
Bill Cupolo	RW	7	1	2	3	0
Gino Rozzini	C	6	1	2	3	6
Pat Egan	D	7	2	0	2	6
Armand Gaudreault	LW	7	0	2	2	8
Murray Henderson	D	7	0	1	1	2
Paul Bibeault	G	7	0	0	0	0
Dit Clapper	RW/D	7	0	0	0	0
Bill Thoms	C	1	0	0	0	2

Goaltending

Player	MIN	GP	W	L	GA	GAA	SO
Paul Bibeault	437	7	3	4	22	3.02	0
Team:	437	7	3	4	22	3.02	0

Note:

Pos = Position;GP = Games played; G = Goals; A = Assists; Pts = Points; PIM = Penalty minutes; +/- = Plus/minus; PPG = Power-play goals; SHG = Short-handed goals; GWG = Game-winning goals
Pos = Position;GP = Games played; Min, TOI = Minutes played; W = Wins; L = Losses; T,T/OT = Ties; OTL = Overtime losses; GA = Goals-against; GAA = Goals-against average; SO = Shutouts; SA = Shots against; SV = Shots saved;SV% = Save percentage;

== See also ==
- 1944–45 NHL season
