= 1944–45 Toronto Maple Leafs season =

NHL hockey team season (won Stanley Cup)

1944–45 Toronto Maple Leafs
- Stanley Cup champions
- League: 3rd NHL
- 1944–45 record: 24–22–4
- Home record: 13–9–3
- Road record: 11–13–1
- Goals for: 183
- Goals against: 161

Team information
- General manager: Conn Smythe
- Coach: Hap Day
- Captain: Bob Davidson
- Arena: Maple Leaf Gardens

Team leaders
- Goals: Ted Kennedy (29)
- Assists: Gus Bodnar (36)
- Points: Ted Kennedy (54)
- Penalty minutes: Reg Hamilton (41)
- Wins: Frank McCool (24)
- Goals against average: Frank McCool (3.22)

The 1944–45 Toronto Maple Leafs season was the club's 28th season in the NHL. Toronto finished in third place in the regular season, with a 24–22–4 record, earning 52 points. The Leafs eliminated their archrivals Montreal Canadiens in the first round of the playoffs, and then defeated the Detroit Red Wings in seven games in the 1945 Stanley Cup Finals.

== Regular season ==
Toronto was a very streaky club during the regular season, where they started off very hot, winning their first six games, and 10 of their first 14, before a mid-season slump, when they managed a 5–10–2 record in 17 games. The Leafs would continue to be a streaky club for the remainder of the year, which included a five-game winning streak, and a seven-game winless streak. Overall, the Maple Leafs managed to end the season with a 24–22–4 record, earning 52 points, and third place in the NHL standings.

The Leafs offense was led teenage superstar Ted Kennedy, who turned 19 during the season, and had a club high 29 goals and 54 points. Gus Bodnar, who was also 19 years old, led the club with 36 assists, while Lorne Carr put together another solid season, scoring 21 goals and adding 25 assists for 46 points. Sweeney Schriner, who only appeared in 26 games, managed to score 22 goals and 37 points. Babe Pratt led the Leafs defense, scoring 18 goals and 41 points, while fellow blueliner Reg Hamilton had 15 points, and a team high 41 penalty minutes.

In goal, rookie Frank McCool had all the action, winning 24 games and posting a 3.22 GAA, while earning four shutouts. McCool would win the Calder Memorial Trophy for his efforts.

The Maple Leafs would open the playoffs against the heavily favoured and defending Stanley Cup champions, the Montreal Canadiens in a best of 7 series. The Canadiens dominated the league, as they had a record of 38–8–4, recording 80 points, which was 28 more than the Leafs. Toronto stunned the Canadiens in the series opener at the Montreal Forum, as Frank McCool shut out the Habs in a 1–0 Leafs victory. The Leafs then went up 2–0 in the series, winning a close game by a 3–2 score. The series shifted to Maple Leaf Gardens, however, the Canadiens roared back, easily defeating Toronto 4–1 to cut the Leafs series lead to 2–1. The fourth game was decided in overtime, and it was the Leafs who were victorious, winning 4–3, and taking a commanding 3–1 series lead. The series moved back to Montreal for the fifth game, and the Canadiens easily dismantled the Leafs, winning 10–3, and sending the series back to Toronto for the sixth game. The Maple Leafs would complete the upset, hanging on for a 4–3 win in the game, and win the series 4–2.

Toronto's opponent in the 1945 Stanley Cup Finals was the Detroit Red Wings, who finished the regular season with a 31–14–5 record, earning 67 points, which was 15 higher than the Leafs. The Red Wings had defeated the Boston Bruins in seven games in the first round. Toronto, led by Frank McCool, would shutout the Red Wings in the first two games held at the Detroit Olympia for an early series lead. The Maple Leafs returned home for the third game, and took a 3–0 series lead as McCool would earn another shutout as Toronto won the game 1–0. The Red Wings managed to finally find the back of the net in the fourth game, winning 5–3 to avoid the sweep. Detroit goaltender Harry Lumley then shutout the Leafs in the fifth game by a score of 2–0, and he would once again earn a shutout in the sixth game, as Detroit won the game 1–0 in overtime to set up a seventh and deciding game. Toronto, led by goaltender Frank McCool and Babe Pratt, who scored the series winning goal, managed to hang on for a 2–1 victory in the seventh game to win the Stanley Cup for the fifth time in club history, and their first title in three years.

=== Final standings ===
National Hockey League
		GP	W	L	T	GF	GA	DIFF	Pts
1	Montreal Canadiens	50	38	8	4	228	121	+107	80
2	Detroit Red Wings	50	31	14	5	218	161	+57	67
3	Toronto Maple Leafs	50	24	22	4	183	161	+22	52
4	Boston Bruins	50	16	30	4	179	219	−40	36
5	Chicago Black Hawks	50	13	30	7	141	194	−53	33
6	New York Rangers	50	11	29	10	154	247	−93	32

=== Record vs. opponents ===
1944–45 NHL Records
Team	BOS	CHI	DET	MTL	NYR	TOR
Boston	—	7–3	0–9–1	0–10	4–3–3	5–5
Chicago	5–5	—	5–5	0–8–2	7–1–2	5–4–1
Detroit	9–0–1	7–3	—	1–8–1	6–2–2	8–1–1
Montreal	10–0	7–1–2	8–1–1	—	9–1	4–5–1
New York	3–4–3	3–3–4	2–6–2	1–9	—	2–7–1
Toronto	5–5	6–3–1	1–8–1	5–4–1	7–2–1	—

== Schedule and results ==
1944–45 regular season
October

Game	Date	Visitor	Score	Home	Record	Pts
1	October 28	New York Rangers	1–2	Toronto Maple Leafs	1–0–0	2
2	October 29	Toronto Maple Leafs	11–5	Chicago Black Hawks	2–0–0	4

November

Game	Date	Visitor	Score	Home	Record	Pts
3	November 2	Toronto Maple Leafs	4–1	Montreal Canadiens	3–0–0	6
4	November 4	Boston Bruins	2–7	Toronto Maple Leafs	4–0–0	8
5	November 9	Toronto Maple Leafs	6–3	New York Rangers	5–0–0	10
6	November 11	Montreal Canadiens	1–3	Toronto Maple Leafs	6–0–0	12
7	November 12	Toronto Maple Leafs	2–4	Detroit Red Wings	6–1–0	12
8	November 15	Detroit Red Wings	8–4	Toronto Maple Leafs	6–2–0	12
9	November 18	Chicago Black Hawks	4–5	Toronto Maple Leafs	7–2–0	14
10	November 19	Toronto Maple Leafs	4–3	Chicago Black Hawks	8–2–0	16
11	November 23	Toronto Maple Leafs	1–5	Boston Bruins	8–3–0	16
12	November 25	Montreal Canadiens	0–2	Toronto Maple Leafs	9–3–0	18
13	November 26	Toronto Maple Leafs	1–4	Montreal Canadiens	9–4–0	18

December

Game	Date	Visitor	Score	Home	Record	Pts
14	December 2	New York Rangers	2–3	Toronto Maple Leafs	10–4–0	20
15	December 3	Toronto Maple Leafs	4–5	Boston Bruins	10–5–0	20
16	December 9	Boston Bruins	5–3	Toronto Maple Leafs	10–6–0	20
17	December 14	Toronto Maple Leafs	2–2	Montreal Canadiens	10–6–1	21
18	December 16	Detroit Red Wings	1–1	Toronto Maple Leafs	10–6–2	22
19	December 23	Detroit Red Wings	5–4	Toronto Maple Leafs	10–7–2	22
20	December 25	Toronto Maple Leafs	4–6	Detroit Red Wings	10–8–2	22
21	December 27	Toronto Maple Leafs	8–2	New York Rangers	11–8–2	24
22	December 30	Chicago Black Hawks	0–4	Toronto Maple Leafs	12–8–2	26

January

Game	Date	Visitor	Score	Home	Record	Pts
23	January 4	Montreal Canadiens	2–4	Toronto Maple Leafs	13–8–2	28
24	January 6	Detroit Red Wings	5–2	Toronto Maple Leafs	13–9–2	28
25	January 9	New York Rangers	5–4	Toronto Maple Leafs	13–10–2	28
26	January 11	Toronto Maple Leafs	4–7	Montreal Canadiens	13–11–2	28
27	January 13	Boston Bruins	1–2	Toronto Maple Leafs	14–11–2	30
28	January 14	Toronto Maple Leafs	0–3	Detroit Red Wings	14–12–2	30
29	January 16	Toronto Maple Leafs	3–5	Boston Bruins	14–13–2	30
30	January 20	Chicago Black Hawks	4–8	Toronto Maple Leafs	15–13–2	32
31	January 21	Toronto Maple Leafs	0–4	Chicago Black Hawks	15–14–2	32
32	January 27	New York Rangers	0–3	Toronto Maple Leafs	16–14–2	34
33	January 28	Toronto Maple Leafs	7–0	New York Rangers	17–14–2	36

February

Game	Date	Visitor	Score	Home	Record	Pts
34	February 3	Boston Bruins	4–2	Toronto Maple Leafs	17–15–2	36
35	February 4	Toronto Maple Leafs	4–3	Chicago Black Hawks	18–15–2	38
36	February 6	Toronto Maple Leafs	5–1	Boston Bruins	19–15–2	40
37	February 10	Chicago Black Hawks	2–1	Toronto Maple Leafs	19–16–2	40
38	February 11	Toronto Maple Leafs	1–2	Chicago Black Hawks	19–17–2	40
39	February 17	Montreal Canadiens	4–3	Toronto Maple Leafs	19–18–2	40
40	February 18	Toronto Maple Leafs	1–6	Detroit Red Wings	19–19–2	40
41	February 24	New York Rangers	4–4	Toronto Maple Leafs	19–19–3	41
42	February 25	Toronto Maple Leafs	2–5	Montreal Canadiens	19–20–3	41
43	February 27	Chicago Black Hawks	3–3	Toronto Maple Leafs	19–20–4	42

March

Game	Date	Visitor	Score	Home	Record	Pts
44	March 3	Montreal Canadiens	2–3	Toronto Maple Leafs	20–20–4	44
45	March 4	Toronto Maple Leafs	6–3	New York Rangers	21–20–4	46
46	March 6	Toronto Maple Leafs	5–2	Boston Bruins	22–20–4	48
47	March 10	Boston Bruins	2–9	Toronto Maple Leafs	23–20–4	50
48	March 11	Toronto Maple Leafs	3–2	Detroit Red Wings	24–20–4	52
49	March 17	Detroit Red Wings	4–3	Toronto Maple Leafs	24–21–4	52
50	March 18	Toronto Maple Leafs	5–6	New York Rangers	24–22–4	52

Legend: Win (2 points) Loss (0 points) Tie (1 point)

== Playoffs ==
1945 Stanley Cup playoffs
Semifinals vs. (1) Montreal Canadiens – Maple Leafs win 4–2

Game	Date	Visitor	Score	Home	Series
1	March 20	Toronto Maple Leafs	1–0	Montreal Canadiens	1–0
2	March 22	Toronto Maple Leafs	3–2	Montreal Canadiens	2–0
3	March 24	Montreal Canadiens	4–1	Toronto Maple Leafs	2–1
4	March 27	Montreal Canadiens	3–4	Toronto Maple Leafs	3–1
5	March 29	Toronto Maple Leafs	3–10	Montreal Canadiens	3–2
6	March 31	Montreal Canadiens	2–3	Toronto Maple Leafs	4–2

Stanley Cup Finals vs. (2) Detroit Red Wings – Maple Leafs win 4–3

Game	Date	Visitor	Score	Home	Series
1	April 6	Toronto Maple Leafs	1–0	Detroit Red Wings	1–0
2	April 8	Toronto Maple Leafs	2–0	Detroit Red Wings	2–0
3	April 12	Detroit Red Wings	0–1	Toronto Maple Leafs	3–0
4	April 14	Detroit Red Wings	5–3	Toronto Maple Leafs	3–1
5	April 19	Toronto Maple Leafs	0–2	Detroit Red Wings	3–2
6	April 21	Detroit Red Wings	1–0	Toronto Maple Leafs	3–3
7	April 22	Toronto Maple Leafs	2–1	Detroit Red Wings	4–3

Legend: Win Loss

== Player statistics ==
=== Regular season ===
Scoring

Player	GP	G	A	Pts	PIM
Ted Kennedy	49	29	25	54	14
Lorne Carr	47	21	25	46	7
Gus Bodnar	49	8	36	44	18
Babe Pratt	50	18	23	41	39
Sweeney Schriner	26	22	15	37	10
Nick Metz	50	22	13	35	26
Mel Hill	45	18	17	35	14
Bob Davidson	50	17	18	35	49
Art Jackson	31	9	13	22	6
Reg Hamilton	50	3	12	15	41
Wally Stanowski	34	2	9	11	16
Pete Backor	36	4	5	9	6
Ross Johnstone	24	3	4	7	8
Tom O'Neill	33	2	5	7	24
John McCreedy	17	2	4	6	11
Bill Ezinicki	8	1	4	5	17
Jack McLean	8	2	1	3	13
Moe Morris	29	0	2	2	18
Frank McCool	50	0	0	0	0

Goaltending

Player	MIN	GP	W	L	T	GA	GAA	SA	SV	SV%	SO
Frank McCool	3000	50	24	22	4	161	3.22				4
Team:	3000	50	24	22	4	161	3.22				4

=== Playoffs ===
Scoring

Player	GP	G	A	Pts	PIM
Ted Kennedy	13	7	2	9	2
Babe Pratt	13	2	4	6	8
Mel Hill	13	2	3	5	6
Gus Bodnar	13	3	1	4	4
Sweeney Schriner	13	3	1	4	4
Lorne Carr	13	2	2	4	5
Moe Morris	13	3	0	3	14
Bob Davidson	13	1	2	3	2
Nick Metz	7	1	1	2	2
Don Metz	11	0	1	1	4
Wally Stanowski	13	0	1	1	5
Reg Hamilton	13	0	0	0	6
Art Jackson	8	0	0	0	0
Frank McCool	13	0	0	0	0
John McCreedy	8	0	0	0	10
Jack McLean	4	0	0	0	0

Goaltending

Player	MIN	GP	W	L	T	GA	GAA	SA	SV	SV%	SO
Frank McCool	807	13	8	5		30	2.23				4
Team:	807	13	8	5		30	2.23				4

== Transactions ==
- October 13, 1944: Acquired Bill Ezinicki from the Buffalo Bisons of the AHL for George Boothman and Don Webster
- October 25, 1944: Signed Free Agent Frank McCool
- November 24, 1944: Acquired John Mahaffy from the Montreal Canadiens for cash
- December 24, 1944: Acquired Art Jackson from the Boston Bruins for $7,500 and Future Considerations

== See also ==
- 1944–45 NHL season
