= 1944–45 Detroit Red Wings season =

Sports season

1944–45 Detroit Red Wings
- League: 2nd NHL
- 1944–45 record: 31–14–5
- Home record: 19–5–1
- Road record: 12–9–4
- Goals for: 218
- Goals against: 161

Team information
- General manager: Jack Adams
- Coach: Jack Adams
- Captain: Flash Hollett
- Arena: Detroit Olympia

Team leaders
- Goals: Joe Carveth (26)
- Assists: Syd Howe (36)
- Points: Joe Carveth (54)
- Penalty minutes: Harold Jackson (45)
- Wins: Harry Lumley (24)
- Goals against average: Normie Smith (3.00)

The 1944–45 season was the Detroit Red Wings' 19th season of operation. The season saw the Wings achieve a record of 31–14–5, finishing second in the National Hockey League (NHL), qualifying the team for the playoffs. The coach and general manager was Jack Adams, with Flash Hollett serving as the team's captain.

After defeating the Boston Bruins in seven games in the semi-final, the Red Wings faced the Toronto Maple Leafs in the 1945 Stanley Cup Final, a rematch of the 1942 series. After being down 3 games to none, the Red Wings stormed back and won the next three to force a pivotal Game 7 back in the Detroit Olympia, looking to become the second team to ever come back from a 3-0 deficit in a seven-game series and avenge their 1942 Stanley Cup loss. However, they were not able to maintain their momentum, and ultimately lost the final game of the series by a score of 2-1, which prevented them from getting revenge on the Maple Leafs for being reversed swept three years prior.

The 1944-45 Red Wings would eventually be joined by the 2023-24 Edmonton Oilers after they lost the 2024 Stanley Cup Final to the Florida Panthers in seven game despite returning from a 3-0 series deficit.

== Regular season ==
Flash Hollett became the first defenseman to score twenty goals in one season. The record would stand until Bobby Orr broke it several decades later.

=== Final standings ===
National Hockey League
		GP	W	L	T	GF	GA	DIFF	Pts
1	Montreal Canadiens	50	38	8	4	228	121	+107	80
2	Detroit Red Wings	50	31	14	5	218	161	+57	67
3	Toronto Maple Leafs	50	24	22	4	183	161	+22	52
4	Boston Bruins	50	16	30	4	179	219	−40	36
5	Chicago Black Hawks	50	13	30	7	141	194	−53	33
6	New York Rangers	50	11	29	10	154	247	−93	32

=== Record vs. opponents ===
1944–45 NHL Records
Team	BOS	CHI	DET	MTL	NYR	TOR
Boston	—	7–3	0–9–1	0–10	4–3–3	5–5
Chicago	5–5	—	5–5	0–8–2	7–1–2	5–4–1
Detroit	9–0–1	7–3	—	1–8–1	6–2–2	8–1–1
Montreal	10–0	7–1–2	8–1–1	—	9–1	4–5–1
New York	3–4–3	3–3–4	2–6–2	1–9	—	2–7–1
Toronto	5–5	6–3–1	1–8–1	5–4–1	7–2–1	—

== Schedule and results ==
1944–45 regular season
October

Game	Result	Date	Score	Opponent	Record
1	W	October 29, 1944	7–1	Boston Bruins (1944–45)	1–0–0

November

Game	Result	Date	Score	Opponent	Record
2	W	November 2, 1944	10–3	New York Rangers (1944–45)	2–0–0
3	L	November 4, 1944	2–3	@ Montreal Canadiens (1944–45)	2–1–0
4	L	November 5, 1944	2–3	Montreal Canadiens (1944–45)	2–2–0
5	L	November 11, 1944	2–5	@ New York Rangers (1944–45)	2–3–0
6	W	November 12, 1944	4–2	Toronto Maple Leafs (1944–45)	3–3–0
7	W	November 15, 1944	8–4	@ Toronto Maple Leafs (1944–45)	4–3–0
8	T	November 18, 1944	2–2	@ New York Rangers (1944–45)	4–3–1
9	W	November 19, 1944	4–3	Boston Bruins (1944–45)	5–3–1
10	T	November 23, 1944	3–3	Montreal Canadiens (1944–45)	5–3–2
11	W	November 25, 1944	7–4	Chicago Black Hawks (1944–45)	6–3–2
12	L	November 26, 1944	5–6	@ Chicago Black Hawks (1944–45)	6–4–2
13	W	November 29, 1944	6–3	@ Boston Bruins (1944–45)	7–4–2

December

Game	Result	Date	Score	Opponent	Record
14	W	December 7, 1944	3–2	@ New York Rangers (1944–45)	8–4–2
15	W	December 10, 1944	7–6	Boston Bruins (1944–45)	9–4–2
16	T	December 16, 1944	1–1	@ Toronto Maple Leafs (1944–45)	9–4–3
17	L	December 17, 1944	1–2	@ Chicago Black Hawks (1944–45)	9–5–3
18	W	December 19, 1944	6–3	@ Boston Bruins (1944–45)	10–5–3
19	W	December 21, 1944	11–3	New York Rangers (1944–45)	11–5–3
20	W	December 23, 1944	5–4	@ Toronto Maple Leafs (1944–45)	12–5–3
21	W	December 25, 1944	6–4	Toronto Maple Leafs (1944–45)	13–5–3
22	L	December 28, 1944	1–9	@ Montreal Canadiens (1944–45)	13–6–3
23	W	December 31, 1944	6–2	Chicago Black Hawks (1944–45)	14–6–3

January

Game	Result	Date	Score	Opponent	Record
24	W	January 1, 1945	4–2	@ Chicago Black Hawks (1944–45)	15–6–3
25	T	January 4, 1945	4–4	@ New York Rangers (1944–45)	15–6–4
EXHIBITION	T	January 5, 1945	0–0	@ Curtis Bay, Coast Guard Cutters	
26	W	January 6, 1945	5–2	@ Toronto Maple Leafs (1944–45)	16–6–4
27	W	January 7, 1945	8–4	Boston Bruins (1944–45)	17–6–4
28	L	January 13, 1945	3–8	@ Montreal Canadiens (1944–45)	17–7–4
29	W	January 14, 1945	3–0	Toronto Maple Leafs (1944–45)	18–7–4
30	W	January 18, 1945	7–3	New York Rangers (1944–45)	19–7–4
31	L	January 21, 1945	3–6	Montreal Canadiens (1944–45)	19–8–4
32	W	January 23, 1945	5–4	@ Boston Bruins (1944–45)	20–8–4
33	W	January 27, 1945	5–1	Chicago Black Hawks (1944–45)	21–8–4
34	W	January 28, 1945	4–2	@ Chicago Black Hawks (1944–45)	22–8–4

February

Game	Result	Date	Score	Opponent	Record
35	L	February 3, 1945	2–5	@ Montreal Canadiens (1944–45)	22–9–4
36	L	February 4, 1945	1–3	Montreal Canadiens (1944–45)	22–10–4
37	L	February 10, 1945	2–5	@ Montreal Canadiens (1944–45)	22–11–4
38	W	February 11, 1945	3–2	@ Boston Bruins (1944–45)	23–11–4
39	W	February 14, 1945	4–2	New York Rangers (1944–45)	24–11–4
40	W	February 18, 1945	6–1	Toronto Maple Leafs (1944–45)	25–11–4
41	L	February 22, 1945	3–5	@ New York Rangers (1944–45)	25–12–4
42	W	February 24, 1945	4–2	Chicago Black Hawks (1944–45)	26–12–4
43	W	February 25, 1945	3–1	@ Chicago Black Hawks (1944–45)	27–12–4

March

Game	Result	Date	Score	Opponent	Record
44	W	March 4, 1945	10–4	Boston Bruins (1944–45)	28–12–4
45	W	March 8, 1945	7–3	New York Rangers (1944–45)	29–12–4
46	L	March 11, 1945	2–3	Toronto Maple Leafs (1944–45)	29–13–4
47	T	March 13, 1945	2–2	@ Boston Bruins (1944–45)	29–13–5
48	W	March 15, 1945	2–1	Montreal Canadiens (1944–45)	30–13–5
49	W	March 17, 1945	4–3	@ Toronto Maple Leafs (1944–45)	31–13–5
50	L	March 18, 1945	3–5	Chicago Black Hawks (1944–45)	31–14–5

Legend: Win (2 points) Loss (0 points) Tie (1 point)

== Player statistics ==
=== Regular season ===
Scoring

Player	Pos	GP	G	A	Pts	PIM
Joe Carveth	RW	50	26	28	54	6
Syd Howe	C/LW	46	17	36	53	6
Mud Bruneteau	RW	43	23	24	47	6
Flash Hollett	D	50	20	21	41	39
Steve Wojciechowski	RW	49	19	20	39	17
Murray Armstrong	C	50	15	24	39	31
Carl Liscombe	LW	42	23	9	32	18
Jud McAtee	LW	44	15	11	26	6
Eddie Bruneteau	RW	42	12	13	25	6
Ted Lindsay	LW	45	17	6	23	43
Bill Quackenbush	D	50	7	14	21	10
Don Grosso	LW/C	20	6	10	16	6
Earl Seibert	D	25	5	9	14	10
Harold Jackson	D	50	5	6	11	45
Tony Bukovich	LW/C	14	7	2	9	6
Butch McDonald	LW/C	3	1	1	2	0
Cully Simon	D	21	0	2	2	26
Lorrain Thibeault	LW	4	0	2	2	2
Hy Buller	D	2	0	0	0	2
Connie Dion	G	12	0	0	0	0
Harry Lumley	G	37	0	0	0	0
Billy Reay	C	2	0	0	0	0
Normie Smith	G	1	0	0	0	0

Goaltending

Player	MIN	GP	W	L	T	GA	GAA	SO
Harry Lumley	2220	37	24	10	3	119	3.22	1
Connie Dion	720	12	6	4	2	39	3.25	0
Normie Smith	60	1	1	0	0	3	3.00	0
Team:	3000	50	31	14	5	161	3.22	1

=== Playoffs ===
Scoring

Player	Pos	GP	G	A	Pts	PIM
Joe Carveth	RW	14	5	6	11	2
Eddie Bruneteau	RW	14	5	2	7	0
Flash Hollett	D	14	3	4	7	6
Murray Armstrong	C	14	4	2	6	2
Carl Liscombe	LW	14	4	2	6	0
Mud Bruneteau	RW	14	3	2	5	2
Jud McAtee	LW	14	2	1	3	0
Earl Seibert	D	14	2	1	3	4
Ted Lindsay	LW	14	2	0	2	6
Harold Jackson	D	14	1	1	2	10
Bill Quackenbush	D	14	0	2	2	2
Tony Bukovich	LW/C	6	0	1	1	0
Fido Purpur	RW	7	0	1	1	4
Steve Wojciechowski	RW	6	0	1	1	0
Gerry Couture	RW	2	0	0	0	0
Syd Howe	C/LW	7	0	0	0	2
Harry Lumley	G	14	0	0	0	0

Goaltending

Player	MIN	GP	W	L	GA	GAA	SO
Harry Lumley	871	14	7	7	31	2.14	2
Team:	871	14	7	7	31	2.14	2

Note: GP = Games played; G = Goals; A = Assists; Pts = Points; +/- = Plus-minus PIM = Penalty minutes; PPG = Power-play goals; SHG = Short-handed goals; GWG = Game-winning goals;
MIN = Minutes played; W = Wins; L = Losses; T = Ties; GA = Goals against; GAA = Goals-against average; SO = Shutouts;

== See also ==
- 1944–45 NHL season
