= 1945 in sports =

Note — many sporting events did not take place because of World War II

1945 in sports describes the year's events in world sport.

== American football ==
- NFL Championship: the Cleveland Rams won 15–14 over the Washington Redskins at Cleveland Stadium
- Army Cadets – college football national championship

== Association football ==
England

- With the end of World War II, the FA Cup is reinstated for the 1945–46 season; played on a two–legged basis. However, clubs are not yet prepared for a full league programme, so the Football League does not resume; regional leagues remain for another year.

France

- 26 August: French Division 1 football is resumed for the first time since 1938–39.

Germany

- There is no major football in Germany due to World War II and the Allied occupation.

Portugal

- Primeira Liga won by S.L. Benfica.

Spain

- La Liga won by Barcelona.

Italy

- Serie A – not contested due to World War II.

Yugoslavia (Serbia)

- Partizan Belgrade was founded in Humska area, Belgrade.
- Red Star Belgrade was founded in Dedinje area, Belgrade on March 4.

== Australian rules football ==
- Victorian Football League
  - Carlton wins the 49th VFL Premiership defeating South Melbourne 15.13 (103) to 10.15 (75) in the Grand Final.
- South Australian National Football League:
  - 29 September: West Torrens win their third SANFL premiership, defeating Port Adelaide 15.25 (115) to 15.12 (102).
- Western Australian National Football League:
  - 29 March: After three seasons of football limited to players under 18 or 19, and a proposal to limit eligibility to players under 25, the WANFL decides to restore open-age league football.
  - 13 October: East Fremantle 12.15 (87) defeat South Fremantle 7.9 (51) for their nineteenth senior WANFL premiership.

== Baseball ==
- World Series – Detroit Tigers defeat the Chicago Cubs, 4 games to 3.
- Negro World Series – Cleveland Buckeyes swept the Homestead Grays, 4 games to 0.
- A professional baseball league, Tokyo Senators was founded in Japan on November 6, as predecessor of Hokkaido Nippon-Ham Fighters.

== Basketball ==
NBL Championship

- Fort Wayne Zollner Pistons over Sheboygan Redskins (3–2)

Events

- The twelfth South American Basketball Championship in Guayaquil is won by Brazil.

Italy

- Pallacanestro Varese was founded in Lombardy Region.

Serbia

- KK Crvena zvezda, as known well for professional basketball club of Serbia, officially founded on March 3.

== Cricket ==
England

- With the end of World War II in Europe, a small number of first-class matches are played for the first time since 1939, but it is not practicable to resume the County Championship or the Minor Counties Championship.
- Most runs – Len Hutton 782 @ 48.87 (HS 188)
- Most wickets – Dick Pollard 28 @ 24.25 (BB 6–75)

Australia

- 23 November – With the lifting of bans on weekday sport at the end of World War II, first-class cricket is played in Australia for the first time since 1 December 1941. The Sheffield Shield, however, is not contested until the following season.

India

- 4–8 March: Cottari Subbanna Nayudu of Holkar sets two first-class records in the Ranji Trophy final against Bombay, bowling 912 balls and conceding 428 runs in the match.
- Ranji Trophy – Bombay beat Holkar by 374 runs
- Bombay Pentangular – Hindus

New Zealand

- 24 December: The Plunket Shield is resumed after having not been contested, despite a small number of interprovincial first-class matches, since 1939–40.

South Africa

- 15 December: With the end of World War II, first-class cricket is played in South Africa for the first time since 14 March 1943, though the last regular interprovincial matches had been in 1939–40.

== Cycling ==
Tour de France

- not contested due to World War II

Giro d'Italia

- not contested due to World War II

== Figure skating ==
World Figure Skating Championships

- not contested due to World War II

== Golf ==
Men's professional

- Masters Tournament – not played due to World War II
- U.S. Open – not played due to World War II
- British Open – not played due to World War II
- PGA Championship – Byron Nelson
- PGA Tour money leader – Byron Nelson – $63,336

Men's amateur

- British Amateur – not played due to World War II
- U.S. Amateur – not played due to World War II

Women's professional

- Women's Western Open – Babe Zaharias
- Titleholders Championship – not played due to World War II

== Horse racing ==
Steeplechases

- Cheltenham Gold Cup – Red Rower
- Grand National – not held due to World War II

Hurdle races

- Champion Hurdle – Brains Trust

Flat races

- Australia – Melbourne Cup won by Rainbird
- Canada – King's Plate won by Uttermost
- France – Prix de l'Arc de Triomphe won by Nikellora
- Ireland – Irish Derby Stakes won by Piccadilly
- English Triple Crown Races:
  1. 2,000 Guineas Stakes – Court Martial
  2. The Derby – Dante
  3. St. Leger Stakes – Chamossaire
- United States Triple Crown Races:
  1. Kentucky Derby – Hoop Jr.
  2. Preakness Stakes – Polynesian
  3. Belmont Stakes – Pavot

== Ice hockey ==
- Stanley Cup: Toronto Maple Leafs beat Detroit Red Wings four games to three.

== Motor racing ==
- Indianapolis 500 – not held due to World War II
- 9 September – The first European Grand Prix since 1939 is held in Paris, being won by Jean-Pierre Wimille.

== Rowing ==
The Boat Race

- Oxford and Cambridge Boat Race is not contested due to World War II

== Rugby league ==
- 1945–46 European Rugby League Championship
- 1945 New Zealand rugby league season
- 1945 NSWRFL season
- 1944–45 Northern Rugby Football League Wartime Emergency League season / 1945–46 Northern Rugby Football League season

== Rugby union ==
- Five Nations Championship series is not contested due to World War II

== Speed skating ==
Speed Skating World Championships

- not contested due to World War II

== Tennis ==
Australia

- Australian Men's Singles Championship – not contested
- Australian Women's Singles Championship – not contested

England

- Wimbledon Men's Singles Championship – not contested
- Wimbledon Women's Singles Championship – not contested

France

- French Men's Singles Championship – Yvon Petra (France) defeats Bernard Destremau (France) 7–5, 6–4, 6–2
- French Women's Singles Championship – Lolette Payot (Switzerland) defeats Simone Iribarne Lafargue (France) 6–3, 6–4

USA

- American Men's Singles Championship – Frank Parker (USA) defeats Bill Talbert (USA) 14–12, 6–1, 6–2
- American Women's Singles Championship – Sarah Palfrey Cooke (USA) defeats Pauline Betz Addie (USA) 3–6, 8–6, 6–4

Davis Cup

- 1945 International Lawn Tennis Challenge – not contested
