= 1945 Stanley Cup Final =

1945 ice hockey championship series

	1	2	3	4	5	6	7	Total
Toronto Maple Leafs	1	2	1	3	0	0*	2	4
Detroit Red Wings	0	0	0	5	2	1*	1	3
- * – Denotes overtime period(s)
- Location(s): Detroit: Olympia Stadium (1, 2, 5, 7); Toronto: Maple Leaf Gardens (3, 4, 6)
- Coaches: Toronto: Hap Day; Detroit: Jack Adams
- Captains: Toronto: Bob Davidson; Detroit: Sid Abel
- Dates: April 6–22, 1945
- Series-winning goal: Babe Pratt (12:14, third)
- Hall of Famers: Maple Leafs: Ted Kennedy (1966); Babe Pratt (1966); Sweeney Schriner (1962); Red Wings: Syd Howe (1965); Ted Lindsay (1966); Harry Lumley (1980); Bill Quackenbush (1976); Earl Seibert (1963); Coaches: Jack Adams (1959, player); Hap Day (1961, player)

The 1945 Stanley Cup Final was a best-of-seven series between the Detroit Red Wings and the Toronto Maple Leafs. The Maple Leafs once again defeated the Red Wings in seven games, despite leading 3–0 in a situation similar to 1942. This was the last Finals until 2024 where a team forced a seventh game after being down 3–0. Detroit is also the most recent NHL team to host a seventh game after falling 3–0 in the series.

== Paths to the Finals ==
Toronto beat the defending champion Montreal Canadiens in six games to advance to the Finals. Detroit defeated the Boston Bruins in seven games to reach the Finals.

== Game summaries ==
This was the first Stanley Cup Final in NHL history where both teams started rookie goaltenders. Harry Lumley, who had become the youngest goaltender to play in the league the previous year, was in the Wings' net, while Frank McCool substituted for regular Maple Leafs netminder Turk Broda, who was in Europe with the Canadian army at the time.

In the first three games, which were low-scoring goaltenders' duels, McCool did not allow the Wings a single goal, the first time one team shut out the other for the first three games in Stanley Cup Final history. In addition, Toronto now stood one win away from sweeping Detroit, as the Red Wings' Mud Bruneteau noted after game three. The last time the two teams had met in the Finals, in 1942, Toronto had beaten Detroit—after going down three games to none, becoming the first professional sports team in North America to win a playoff round in such a fashion. Fittingly enough, the Red Wings did the coming back this time, as their offense finally caught fire.

In game four, the Maple Leafs had a chance to win the Cup on Maple Leaf Gardens ice, but the Red Wings got on the board for the first time in the series when Flash Hollett opened the scoring 8:35 into the game, ending McCool's shutout streak at 193:09 (dating back to the semifinals against Montreal). Four other Detroit players, including rookie Ted Lindsay (who scored what transpired to be the game-winner at 3:20 of the third period), scored to overcome Ted Kennedy's hat trick.

Games five and six were Lumley's time to shine, shutting out the Leafs, including an overtime shutout in the sixth game, and extending the Finals. The series returned to Detroit for a seventh game, the Wings hoping to avenge their "choking" against the Leafs in 1942.

=== Game one ===
April 6	Toronto Maple Leafs	1–0	Detroit Red Wings	Olympia Stadium	Recap
Sweeney Schriner (3) - 13:56		First period	No scoring
No scoring		Second period	No scoring
No scoring		Third period	No scoring
Frank McCool		Goalie stats	Harry Lumley

Scoring summary
Period	Team	Goal	Assist(s)	Time	Score
1st	TOR	Sweeney Schriner (3)	Unassisted	13:56	1–0 PIT
2nd	None				
3rd	None				

=== Game two ===
April 8	Toronto Maple Leafs	2–0	Detroit Red Wings	Olympia Stadium	Recap

=== Game three ===
April 12	Detroit Red Wings	0–1	Toronto Maple Leafs	Maple Leaf Gardens	Recap

=== Game four ===
April 14	Detroit Red Wings	5–3	Toronto Maple Leafs	Maple Leaf Gardens	Recap

=== Game five ===
April 19	Toronto Maple Leafs	0–2	Detroit Red Wings	Olympia Stadium	Recap

=== Game six ===
April 21	Detroit Red Wings	1–0	OT	Toronto Maple Leafs	Maple Leaf Gardens	Recap

=== Game seven ===
April 22	Toronto Maple Leafs	2–1	Detroit Red Wings	Olympia Stadium	Recap

Toronto coach Hap Day almost had to eat his words of a few years back when he said of the Leafs' 1942 comeback from being down 3–0 in games, "There will never be another experience like this." Babe Pratt, however, scored the winning goal in a 2–1 victory that saved the Maple Leafs from being the victim of a great comeback win by the Red Wings. Lumley left the ice almost immediately after the end of the game, but a Detroit Olympia crowd chant of "We want Lumley!" brought him back. Lumley would go on to a Hockey Hall of Fame career. and McCool played just 22 more games in the NHL, as Broda returned to the Leafs in January 1946.

== Stanley Cup engraving ==
The 1945 Stanley Cup was presented to Maple Leafs captain Bob Davidson by NHL President Red Dutton following the Maple Leafs 2–1 win over the Red Wings in game seven.

The following Maple Leafs players and staff had their names engraved on the Stanley Cup

1944–45 Toronto Maple Leafs

=== Players ===
Centres

- 7 Jack McLean (also played wing)
- 10 Ted Teeder Kennedy*
- 17 Art Jackson
- 21 Gus Bodnar

Wingers

- 4 Bob Davidson (Captain)
- 8 Mel Hill
- 9 Lorne Carr
- 11 David Sweeney Schriner
- 15 Nick Metz
- 18 Tom O'Neill
- 19 Don Metz
- 20 John McCreedy

Defencemen

- 2 Walter Babe Pratt
- 3 Reg Hamilton
- 5 Elwyn "Moe" Morris
- 12 Ross Johnstone
- 14 Pete Backor
- 16 Wally Stanowski

Goaltenders

1 Frank McCool

=== Coaching and administrative staff ===
- Jack Bickell (Chairman/Owner), Ed Bickle (President/Owner)
- William MacBrien, (Vice President/Owner), John Murdoch (Vice President)
- Conn Smythe (Manager), Frank Selke Sr.(Business Manager/Publicity Director)
- Clarence Hap Day (Coach), Tim Daly (Trainer)
- Archie Campbell (Asst. Trainer)
- Kerry Day (Mascot)

== See also ==
- 1944–45 NHL season

== References and notes ==
- Diamond, Dan (2000). Total Stanley Cup. Toronto: Total Sports Canada. ISBN 978-1-892129-07-9.
- Podnieks, Andrew; Hockey Hall of Fame (2004). Lord Stanley's Cup. Bolton, Ont.: Fenn Pub. pp 12, 50. ISBN 978-1-55168-261-7
- "All-Time NHL Results". Archived from the original on July 24, 2017.

Preceded by Montreal Canadiens; 1944	Toronto Maple Leafs; Stanley Cup champions 1945	Succeeded by Montreal Canadiens; 1946
