= 1944–45 Montreal Canadiens season =

NHL hockey team season

1944–45 Montreal Canadiens
- Prince of Wales Trophy winners
- League: 1st NHL
- 1944–45 record: 38–8–4
- Home record: 21–2–2
- Road record: 17–6–2
- Goals for: 228
- Goals against: 121

Team information
- General manager: Tommy Gorman
- Coach: Dick Irvin
- Captain: Toe Blake
- Arena: Montreal Forum

Team leaders
- Goals: Maurice Richard (50)
- Assists: Elmer Lach (54)
- Points: Elmer Lach (80)
- Penalty minutes: Maurice Richard (46)
- Wins: Bill Durnan (38)
- Goals against average: Bill Durnan (2.42)

The 1944–45 Montreal Canadiens season was the Canadiens' 36th season. The Canadiens placed first in the regular season, but lost to the Toronto Maple Leafs in the semi-finals.

== Regular season ==
=== Maurice Richard's 50 goals in 50 games ===
In 1944–45, Maurice Richard made NHL history by becoming the first player to score 50 goals in one season, reaching the mark on the final night of the season — 50 goals in 50 games.

=== Final standings ===
National Hockey League
		GP	W	L	T	GF	GA	DIFF	Pts
1	Montreal Canadiens	50	38	8	4	228	121	+107	80
2	Detroit Red Wings	50	31	14	5	218	161	+57	67
3	Toronto Maple Leafs	50	24	22	4	183	161	+22	52
4	Boston Bruins	50	16	30	4	179	219	−40	36
5	Chicago Black Hawks	50	13	30	7	141	194	−53	33
6	New York Rangers	50	11	29	10	154	247	−93	32

=== Record vs. opponents ===
1944–45 NHL Records
Team	BOS	CHI	DET	MTL	NYR	TOR
Boston	—	7–3	0–9–1	0–10	4–3–3	5–5
Chicago	5–5	—	5–5	0–8–2	7–1–2	5–4–1
Detroit	9–0–1	7–3	—	1–8–1	6–2–2	8–1–1
Montreal	10–0	7–1–2	8–1–1	—	9–1	4–5–1
New York	3–4–3	3–3–4	2–6–2	1–9	—	2–7–1
Toronto	5–5	6–3–1	1–8–1	5–4–1	7–2–1	—

== Schedule and results ==
1944–45 regular season
October

Game	Result	Date	Score	Opponent	Record
1	W	October 28, 1944	3–2	Boston Bruins (1944–45)	1–0–0

November

Game	Result	Date	Score	Opponent	Record
2	L	November 2, 1944	1–4	Toronto Maple Leafs (1944–45)	1–1–0
3	W	November 4, 1944	3–2	Detroit Red Wings (1944–45)	2–1–0
4	W	November 5, 1944	3–2	@ Detroit Red Wings (1944–45)	3–1–0
5	W	November 9, 1944	9–2	Chicago Black Hawks (1944–45)	4–1–0
6	L	November 11, 1944	1–3	@ Toronto Maple Leafs (1944–45)	4–2–0
7	W	November 12, 1944	4–2	@ Chicago Black Hawks (1944–45)	5–2–0
8	W	November 18, 1944	6–3	Boston Bruins (1944–45)	6–2–0
9	W	November 19, 1944	6–2	@ New York Rangers (1944–45)	7–2–0
10	W	November 21, 1944	4–1	@ Boston Bruins (1944–45)	8–2–0
11	T	November 23, 1944	3–3	@ Detroit Red Wings (1944–45)	8–2–1
12	L	November 25, 1944	0–2	@ Toronto Maple Leafs (1944–45)	8–3–1
13	W	November 26, 1944	4–1	Toronto Maple Leafs (1944–45)	9–3–1
14	L	November 30, 1944	5–7	New York Rangers (1944–45)	9–4–1

December

Game	Result	Date	Score	Opponent	Record
15	W	December 3, 1944	2–1	@ Chicago Black Hawks (1944–45)	10–4–1
16	W	December 5, 1944	4–1	@ Boston Bruins (1944–45)	11–4–1
17	T	December 14, 1944	2–2	Toronto Maple Leafs (1944–45)	11–4–2
18	W	December 16, 1944	8–5	Boston Bruins (1944–45)	12–4–2
19	W	December 17, 1944	4–1	@ New York Rangers (1944–45)	13–4–2
20	W	December 23, 1944	2–1	Chicago Black Hawks (1944–45)	14–4–2
21	W	December 28, 1944	9–1	Detroit Red Wings (1944–45)	15–4–2
22	W	December 30, 1944	4–1	New York Rangers (1944–45)	16–4–2

January

Game	Result	Date	Score	Opponent	Record
23	W	January 2, 1945	6–3	@ Boston Bruins (1944–45)	17–4–2
24	L	January 4, 1945	2–4	@ Toronto Maple Leafs (1944–45)	17–5–2
25	W	January 6, 1945	10–1	Chicago Black Hawks (1944–45)	18–5–2
26	W	January 11, 1945	7–4	Toronto Maple Leafs (1944–45)	19–5–2
27	W	January 13, 1945	8–3	Detroit Red Wings (1944–45)	20–5–2
28	W	January 14, 1945	6–2	@ New York Rangers (1944–45)	21–5–2
29	W	January 17, 1945	4–2	@ Chicago Black Hawks (1944–45)	22–5–2
30	W	January 20, 1945	5–2	New York Rangers (1944–45)	23–5–2
31	W	January 21, 1945	6–3	@ Detroit Red Wings (1944–45)	24–5–2
32	W	January 27, 1945	11–3	Boston Bruins (1944–45)	25–5–2
33	W	January 28, 1945	4–1	@ Boston Bruins (1944–45)	26–5–2

February

Game	Result	Date	Score	Opponent	Record
34	T	February 1, 1945	1–1	Chicago Black Hawks (1944–45)	26–5–3
35	W	February 3, 1945	5–2	Detroit Red Wings (1944–45)	27–5–3
36	W	February 4, 1945	3–1	@ Detroit Red Wings (1944–45)	28–5–3
37	W	February 8, 1945	9–4	New York Rangers (1944–45)	29–5–3
38	W	February 10, 1945	5–2	Detroit Red Wings (1944–45)	30–5–3
39	W	February 11, 1945	4–3	@ New York Rangers (1944–45)	31–5–3
40	W	February 17, 1945	4–3	@ Toronto Maple Leafs (1944–45)	32–5–3
41	T	February 18, 1945	0–0	@ Chicago Black Hawks (1944–45)	32–5–4
42	W	February 25, 1945	5–2	Toronto Maple Leafs (1944–45)	33–5–4

March

Game	Result	Date	Score	Opponent	Record
43	L	March 3, 1945	2–3	@ Toronto Maple Leafs (1944–45)	33–6–4
44	L	March 4, 1945	4–6	@ Chicago Black Hawks (1944–45)	33–7–4
45	W	March 8, 1945	3–2	Boston Bruins (1944–45)	34–7–4
46	W	March 10, 1945	7–3	New York Rangers (1944–45)	35–7–4
47	W	March 11, 1945	11–5	@ New York Rangers (1944–45)	36–7–4
48	L	March 15, 1945	1–2	@ Detroit Red Wings (1944–45)	36–8–4
49	W	March 17, 1945	4–3	Chicago Black Hawks (1944–45)	37–8–4
50	W	March 18, 1945	4–2	@ Boston Bruins (1944–45)	38–8–4

Legend: Win (2 points) Loss (0 points) Tie (1 point)

== Player statistics ==
=== Regular season ===
==== Scoring ====
Player	Pos	GP	G	A	Pts	PIM
Elmer Lach	C	50	26	54	80	37
Maurice Richard	RW	50	50	23	73	46
Toe Blake	LW	49	29	38	67	25
Buddy O'Connor	C	50	21	23	44	2
Dutch Hiller	LW	48	20	16	36	20
Emile Bouchard	D	50	11	23	34	34
Fern Gauthier	RW	50	18	13	31	23
Leo Lamoureux	C/D	49	2	22	24	58
Ray Getliffe	C/LW	41	16	7	23	34
Ken Mosdell	C	31	12	6	18	16
Bob Fillion	LW	31	6	8	14	12
Murph Chamberlain	LW	32	2	12	14	38
Frank Eddolls	D	43	5	8	13	20
Glen Harmon	D	42	5	8	13	41
Fern Majeau	C/LW	12	2	6	8	4
Roly Rossignol	RW	5	2	2	4	2
Wilf Field	D	9	1	0	1	10
Rosario Joannette	C	2	0	1	1	4
Nils Tremblay	C	1	0	1	1	0
Bill Durnan	G	50	0	0	0	0

==== Goaltending ====
Player	MIN	GP	W	L	T	GA	GAA	SO
Bill Durnan	3000	50	38	8	4	121	2.42	1
Team:	3000	50	38	8	4	121	2.42	1

=== Playoffs ===
==== Scoring ====
Player	Pos	GP	G	A	Pts	PIM
Maurice Richard	RW	6	6	2	8	10
Elmer Lach	C	6	4	4	8	2
Emile Bouchard	D	6	3	4	7	4
Bob Fillion	LW	1	3	0	3	0
Murph Chamberlain	LW	6	1	1	2	10
Dutch Hiller	LW	6	1	1	2	4
Leo Lamoureux	C/D	6	1	1	2	2
Toe Blake	LW	6	0	2	2	5
Eddie Emberg	C	2	1	0	1	0
Glen Harmon	D	6	1	0	1	2
Ray Getliffe	C/LW	6	0	1	1	0
John Mahaffy	C	1	0	1	1	0
Butch Stahan	D	3	0	1	1	2
Bill Durnan	G	6	0	0	0	0
Frank Eddolls	D	3	0	0	0	0
Fern Gauthier	RW	4	0	0	0	0
Buddy O'Connor	C	2	0	0	0	0
Roly Rossignol	RW	1	0	0	0	2
Nils Tremblay	C	2	0	0	0	0

==== Goaltending ====
Player	MIN	GP	W	L	GA	GAA	SO
Bill Durnan	373	6	2	4	15	2.41	0
Team:	373	6	2	4	15	2.41	0

Note:

Pos = Position;GP = Games played; G = Goals; A = Assists; Pts = Points; PIM = Penalty minutes; +/- = Plus/minus; PPG = Power-play goals; SHG = Short-handed goals; GWG = Game-winning goals
Pos = Position;GP = Games played; Min, TOI = Minutes played; W = Wins; L = Losses; T,T/OT = Ties; OTL = Overtime losses; GA = Goals-against; GAA = Goals-against average; SO = Shutouts; SA = Shots against; SV = Shots saved;SV% = Save percentage;
