= 1944–45 New York Rangers season =

NHL hockey team season

1944–45 New York Rangers
- League: 6th NHL
- 1944–45 record: 11–29–10
- Home record: 7–11–7
- Road record: 4–18–3
- Goals for: 154
- Goals against: 247

Team information
- General manager: Lester Patrick
- Coach: Frank Boucher
- Captain: Ott Heller
- Arena: Madison Square Garden

Team leaders
- Goals: Ab DeMarco (24)
- Assists: Ab DeMarco (30)
- Points: Ab DeMarco (54)
- Penalty minutes: Bob Dill (69)
- Wins: Ken McAuley (11)
- Goals against average: Ken McAuley (4.93)

The 1944–45 New York Rangers season was the franchise's 19th season. During the regular season, the Rangers posted an 11–29–10 record and finished with 32 points. The Rangers' third straight last-place finish caused them to miss the NHL playoffs.

== Regular season ==
=== Final standings ===
National Hockey League
		GP	W	L	T	GF	GA	DIFF	Pts
1	Montreal Canadiens	50	38	8	4	228	121	+107	80
2	Detroit Red Wings	50	31	14	5	218	161	+57	67
3	Toronto Maple Leafs	50	24	22	4	183	161	+22	52
4	Boston Bruins	50	16	30	4	179	219	−40	36
5	Chicago Black Hawks	50	13	30	7	141	194	−53	33
6	New York Rangers	50	11	29	10	154	247	−93	32

=== Record vs. opponents ===
1944–45 NHL Records
Team	BOS	CHI	DET	MTL	NYR	TOR
Boston	—	7–3	0–9–1	0–10	4–3–3	5–5
Chicago	5–5	—	5–5	0–8–2	7–1–2	5–4–1
Detroit	9–0–1	7–3	—	1–8–1	6–2–2	8–1–1
Montreal	10–0	7–1–2	8–1–1	—	9–1	4–5–1
New York	3–4–3	3–3–4	2–6–2	1–9	—	2–7–1
Toronto	5–5	6–3–1	1–8–1	5–4–1	7–2–1	—

== Schedule and results ==
1944–45 regular season
October: 0–1–0 (home: 0-0-0; road: 0–1–0)

Game	October	Opponent	Score	Record
1	28	@ Toronto Maple Leafs	2–1	0–1–0

November: 2–5–3 (home: 1–2–2; road: 1–3–1)

Game	November	Opponent	Score	Record
2	1	@ Chicago Black Hawks	8–3	0–2–0
3	2	@ Detroit Red Wings	10–3	0–3–0
4	9	Toronto Maple Leafs	6–3	0–4–0
5	11	Detroit Red Wings	5–2	1–4–0
6	12	Boston Bruins	5–5	1–4–1
7	18	Detroit Red Wings	2–2	1–4–2
8	19	Montreal Canadiens	6–2	1–5–2
9	23	@ Chicago Black Hawks	4–4	1–5–3
10	26	@ Boston Bruins	8–4	1–6–3
11	30	@ Montreal Canadiens	7–5	2–6–3

December: 2–7–2 (home: 1–3–2; road: 1–4–0)

Game	December	Opponent	Score	Record
12	2	@ Toronto Maple Leafs	4–3	2–7–3
13	7	Detroit Red Wings	3–2	2–8–3
14	10	Chicago Black Hawks	1–1	2–8–4
15	12	@ Boston Bruins	7–5	2–9–4
16	17	Montreal Canadiens	4–1	2–10–4
17	20	@ Chicago Black Hawks	3–1	3–10–4
18	21	@ Detroit Red Wings	11–3	3–11–4
19	24	Chicago Black Hawks	3–3	3–11–5
20	27	Toronto Maple Leafs	8–2	3–12–5
21	30	@ Montreal Canadiens	4–1	3–13–5
22	31	Boston Bruins	3–2	4–13–5

January: 3–6–2 (home: 1–2–2; road: 2–4–0)

Game	January	Opponent	Score	Record
23	4	Detroit Red Wings	4–4	4–13–6
24	7	Chicago Black Hawks	0–0	4–13–7
25	9	@ Toronto Maple Leafs	5–4	5–13–7
26	11	Boston Bruins	5–1	6–13–7
27	14	Montreal Canadiens	6–2	6–14–7
28	18	@ Detroit Red Wings	7–3	6–15–7
29	20	@ Montreal Canadiens	5–2	6–16–7
30	21	@ Boston Bruins	14–3	6–17–7
31	24	@ Chicago Black Hawks	4–3	7–17–7
32	27	@ Toronto Maple Leafs	3–0	7–18–7
33	28	Toronto Maple Leafs	7–0	7–19–7

February: 3–4–3 (home: 3–1–1; road: 0–3–2)

Game	February	Opponent	Score	Record
34	4	@ Boston Bruins	3–3	7–19–8
35	8	@ Montreal Canadiens	9–4	7–20–8
36	11	Montreal Canadiens	4–3	7–21–8
37	14	@ Detroit Red Wings	4–2	7–22–8
38	15	Chicago Black Hawks	6–2	8–22–8
39	17	@ Boston Bruins	6–1	8–23–8
40	18	Boston Bruins	2–1	9–23–8
41	22	Detroit Red Wings	5–3	10–23–8
42	24	@ Toronto Maple Leafs	4–4	10–23–9
43	25	Boston Bruins	4–4	10–23–10

March: 1–6–0 (home: 1–3–0; road: 0–3–0)

Game	March	Opponent	Score	Record
44	1	Chicago Black Hawks	5–3	10–24–10
45	4	Toronto Maple Leafs	6–3	10–25–10
46	7	@ Chicago Black Hawks	6–3	10–26–10
47	8	@ Detroit Red Wings	7–3	10–27–10
48	10	@ Montreal Canadiens	7–3	10–28–10
49	11	Montreal Canadiens	11–5	10–29–10
50	18	Toronto Maple Leafs	6–5	11–29–10

Legend: Win (2 points) Loss (0 points) Tie (1 point)

== Player statistics ==
Skaters

Regular season
Player	GP	G	A	Pts	PIM
Ab DeMarco	50	24	30	54	10
Grant Warwick	42	20	22	42	25
Hank Goldup	48	17	25	42	25
Fred Thurier	50	16	19	35	14
Fred Hunt	44	13	9	22	6
Joe Shack	50	4	18	22	14
Walt Atanas	49	13	8	21	40
Phil Watson	45	11	8	19	24
Ehrhardt Heller	45	7	12	19	26
James MacDonald	36	9	6	15	12
Bob Dill	48	9	5	14	69
Wilfred McDonald	40	2	9	11	0
Jack Mann	6	3	4	7	0
Bill Moe	35	2	4	6	14
Chuck Scherza	22	2	3	5	18
Guy Labrie	27	2	2	4	14
Neil Colville	4	0	1	1	2
Len Wharton	1	0	0	0	0
Alex Ritson	1	0	0	0	0
Jim Drummond	2	0	0	0	0
Hal Cooper	8	0	0	0	2

Goaltenders

Regular season
Player	GP	TOI	W	L	T	GA	GAA	SO
Ken McAuley	46	2760	11	25	10	227	4.93	1
Doug Stevenson^{†}	4	240	0	4	0	20	5.00	0

^{†}Denotes player spent time with another team before joining Rangers. Stats reflect time with Rangers only.
^{‡}Traded mid-season. Stats reflect time with Rangers only.

Note:

Pos = Position;GP = Games played; G = Goals; A = Assists; Pts = Points; PIM = Penalty minutes; +/- = Plus/minus; PPG = Power-play goals; SHG = Short-handed goals; GWG = Game-winning goals
Pos = Position;GP = Games played; Min, TOI = Minutes played; W = Wins; L = Losses; T,T/OT = Ties; OTL = Overtime losses; GA = Goals-against; GAA = Goals-against average; SO = Shutouts; SA = Shots against; SV = Shots saved;SV% = Save percentage;

== See also ==
- 1944–45 NHL season
