= Hal Cooper =

Hal Cooper may refer to:

- Hal Cooper (director) (1923–2014), American television director and producer
- Hal Cooper (ice hockey) (1913–1977), Canadian ice hockey player
- Hal Cooper (American football), American football player
- Hal Cooper (Archie Comics), a fictional character in Archie Comics
