= Babe Pratt =

Canadian ice hockey player (1916–1988)

- Hockey Hall of Fame, 1966
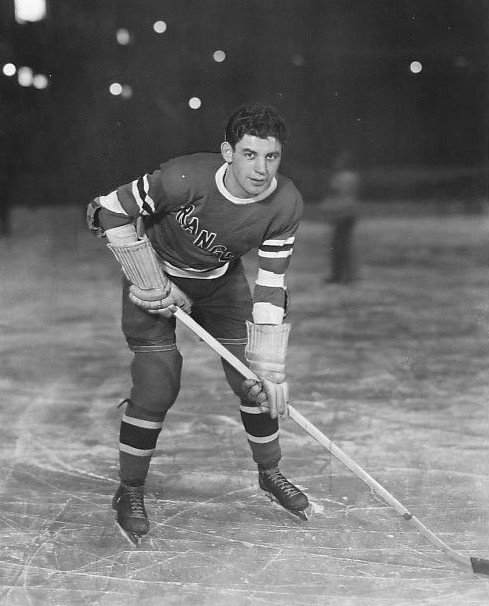
- Born: January 7, 1916 Stony Mountain, Manitoba, Canada
- Died: December 16, 1988 (aged 72) Vancouver, British Columbia, Canada
- Height: 6 ft 3 in (191 cm)
- Weight: 212 lb (96 kg; 15 st 2 lb)
- Position: Defence
- Shot: Left
- Played for: New York Rangers; Toronto Maple Leafs; Boston Bruins
- Playing career: 1935–1952

Walter Peter "Babe" Pratt (January 7, 1916 – December 16, 1988) was a Canadian professional ice hockey defenceman/left winger who played for the New York Rangers, Toronto Maple Leafs and the Boston Bruins in the National Hockey League between 1935 and 1947. He is the father of the NHL hockey player, Tracy Pratt.

Babe was an important member of two Stanley Cup winning teams, the 1940 Rangers and 1945 Maple Leafs. He won the Hart Trophy in 1944. He was inducted into the Hockey Hall of Fame in 1966.

In January 1946, Pratt was caught betting on hockey games and was subsequently suspended from the NHL. Pratt admitted to gambling but denied ever placing a bet against his own team. After promising to quit betting he was reinstated to the Toronto Maple Leafs. His last NHL season was with the Boston Bruins in 1946–47 and he played in the minors after that.

He subsequently worked as an analyst for CBC Television's Hockey Night In Canada telecasts from Vancouver in the 1970s and served as a goodwill ambassador of the Vancouver Canucks. Pratt died of a heart attack in the media lounge of the Pacific Coliseum in Vancouver during the first intermission of a Canucks game on December 16, 1988. The Canucks honored Pratt's memory by stitching "BABE" on their sweaters for the remainder of the hockey season.

In 1998, he was ranked number 96 on The Hockey News' list of the 100 Greatest Hockey Players.

== Career statistics ==
=== Regular season and playoffs ===
| | | | Regular season | | | | | Playoffs |
| Season | Team | League | GP | G | A | Pts | PIM | GP | G | A | Pts | PIM |
|---|---|---|---|---|---|---|---|---|---|---|---|---|
| 1933–34 | Kenora Thistles | MJHL | 16 | 14 | 7 | 21 | 33 | 9 | 6 | 2 | 8 | 18 |
| 1933–34 | Kenora Thistles | M-Cup | — | — | — | — | — | 4 | 4 | 4 | 8 | 14 |
| 1934–35 | Kenora Thistles | MJHL | 18 | 19 | 23 | 42 | 18 | 2 | 0 | 4 | 4 | 2 |
| 1935–36 | New York Rangers | NHL | 17 | 1 | 1 | 2 | 16 | — | — | — | — | — |
| 1935–36 | Philadelphia Ramblers | Can-Am | 28 | 7 | 8 | 15 | 48 | 4 | 0 | 0 | 0 | 2 |
| 1936–37 | New York Rangers | NHL | 47 | 8 | 7 | 15 | 23 | 9 | 3 | 1 | 4 | 11 |
| 1937–38 | New York Rangers | NHL | 47 | 5 | 14 | 19 | 56 | 2 | 0 | 0 | 0 | 2 |
| 1938–39 | New York Rangers | NHL | 48 | 2 | 19 | 21 | 20 | 7 | 1 | 2 | 3 | 9 |
| 1939–40 | New York Rangers | NHL | 48 | 4 | 13 | 17 | 61 | 12 | 3 | 1 | 4 | 18 |
| 1940–41 | New York Rangers | NHL | 47 | 3 | 17 | 20 | 52 | 3 | 1 | 1 | 2 | 6 |
| 1941–42 | New York Rangers | NHL | 47 | 4 | 24 | 28 | 65 | 6 | 1 | 3 | 4 | 34 |
| 1942–43 | New York Rangers | NHL | 4 | 0 | 2 | 2 | 6 | — | — | — | — | — |
| 1942–43 | Toronto Maple Leafs | NHL | 40 | 12 | 25 | 37 | 44 | 6 | 1 | 2 | 3 | 8 |
| 1943–44 | Toronto Maple Leafs | NHL | 50 | 17 | 40 | 57 | 30 | 5 | 0 | 3 | 3 | 4 |
| 1944–45 | Toronto Maple Leafs | NHL | 50 | 18 | 23 | 41 | 39 | 13 | 2 | 4 | 6 | 8 |
| 1945–46 | Toronto Maple Leafs | NHL | 41 | 5 | 20 | 25 | 36 | — | — | — | — | — |
| 1946–47 | Boston Bruins | NHL | 31 | 4 | 4 | 8 | 25 | — | — | — | — | — |
| 1946–47 | Hershey Bears | AHL | 21 | 5 | 10 | 15 | 23 | 11 | 3 | 5 | 8 | 19 |
| 1947–48 | Cleveland Barons | AHL | 17 | 1 | 4 | 5 | 8 | — | — | — | — | — |
| 1947–48 | Hershey Bears | AHL | 36 | 2 | 14 | 16 | 39 | 2 | 0 | 0 | 0 | 0 |
| 1948–49 | New Westminster Royals | PCHL | 63 | 18 | 48 | 66 | 64 | 12 | 1 | 8 | 9 | 10 |
| 1949–50 | New Westminster Royals | PCHL | 59 | 8 | 29 | 37 | 56 | 18 | 2 | 6 | 8 | 22 |
| 1950–51 | New Westminster Royals | PCHL | 65 | 8 | 15 | 23 | 54 | 7 | 0 | 0 | 0 | 4 |
| 1951–52 | Tacoma Rockets | PCHL | 63 | 7 | 31 | 38 | 20 | 5 | 0 | 1 | 1 | 0 |
| NHL totals | | | 517 | 83 | 209 | 292 | 473 | 63 | 12 | 17 | 29 | 100 |

== Awards and achievements ==
- MJHL Scoring Champion (1935)
- Turnbull Cup MJHL Championship (1934)
- Stanley Cup championship (1940 and 1945)
- NHL First All-Star team Defence (1944)
- Hart Memorial Trophy winner (1944)
- NHL second All-Star team Defence (1945)
- Inducted into the Hockey Hall of Fame in 1966
- Inducted into the Manitoba Sports Hall of Fame and Museum in 1990
- Selected to Manitoba's All-Century first All-Star team
- Honoured Member of the Manitoba Hockey Hall of Fame
- In 1998, he was ranked number 96 on The Hockey News' list of the 100 Greatest Hockey Players
- In the 2009 book 100 Ranger Greats, was ranked No. 47 all-time of the 901 New York Rangers who had played during the team's first 82 seasons
- Tied for most assists by a defenceman in one game with 6
- Scored the game-winning goal for the Toronto Maple Leafs in the 1945 Stanley Cup Final

| Preceded by Bill Cowley | Winner of the Hart Trophy; 1944 | Succeeded by Elmer Lach |
