= 1944–45 Chicago Black Hawks season =

NHL ice hockey team season

1944–45 Chicago Black Hawks
- League: 5th NHL
- 1944–45 record: 13–30–7
- Home record: 9–14–2
- Road record: 4–16–5
- Goals for: 141
- Goals against: 194

Team information
- General manager: Bill Tobin
- Coach: Paul Thompson (0–1–0); Johnny Gottselig (13–29–7)
- Captain: Clint Smith
- Arena: Chicago Stadium

Team leaders
- Goals: Bill Mosienko (28)
- Assists: Clint Smith (31)
- Points: Bill Mosienko and Clint Smith (54)
- Penalty minutes: Joe Cooper (50)
- Wins: Mike Karakas (12)
- Goals against average: Mike Karakas (3.90)

The 1944–45 Chicago Black Hawks season was the team's 19th season in the NHL, and they were coming off an appearance in the 1944 Stanley Cup Final, losing to the Montreal Canadiens in 4 games.

The Black Hawks would lose their top scorer Doug Bentley, who was given permission to stay home in Saskatchewan and tend the family farm by the Canadian Armed Forces officials, while his brother Max Bentley would miss his 2nd season due to World War II. The club would name Clint Smith as team captain, and after the first game of the season, a loss of 11–5 against the Toronto Maple Leafs, head coach Paul Thompson was replaced by former Black Hawk captain Johnny Gottselig.

The Hawks would struggle to score goals, scoring a league low 141, while allowing 194, which ranked them 4th. The team would finish the season with a 13–30–7 record, and their 33 points was their lowest point total since 1938–39. Chicago would fail to make the post-season, as they would finish 3 points behind the Boston Bruins for 4th place.

Midway through the season, the Black Hawks would be involved in a big trade with the Detroit Red Wings, as Chicago would trade Earl Seibert and Fido Purpur to the Wings for Butch McDonald, Don Grosso, and Cully Simon.

Offensively, the Hawks were led by Bill Mosienko, who led the team with 28 goals, Clint Smith with his team high 31 assists, and the two of them would tie for the team lead in points at 54. Pete Horeck would be the only other Black Hawk to score more than 10 goals, as he had 20. Joe Cooper would lead the defense all season long, earning 21 points and a team high 50 penalty minutes.

In goal, the Hawks would bring back Mike Karakas, and he would lead the team with 12 wins and a 3.90 GAA, and earn 4 shutouts. Doug Stevenson would appear in a couple of games, getting a 1–1–0 record with a GAA of 3.50.

== Season standings ==
National Hockey League
		GP	W	L	T	GF	GA	DIFF	Pts
1	Montreal Canadiens	50	38	8	4	228	121	+107	80
2	Detroit Red Wings	50	31	14	5	218	161	+57	67
3	Toronto Maple Leafs	50	24	22	4	183	161	+22	52
4	Boston Bruins	50	16	30	4	179	219	−40	36
5	Chicago Black Hawks	50	13	30	7	141	194	−53	33
6	New York Rangers	50	11	29	10	154	247	−93	32

=== Record vs. opponents ===
1944–45 NHL Records
Team	BOS	CHI	DET	MTL	NYR	TOR
Boston	—	7–3	0–9–1	0–10	4–3–3	5–5
Chicago	5–5	—	5–5	0–8–2	7–1–2	5–4–1
Detroit	9–0–1	7–3	—	1–8–1	6–2–2	8–1–1
Montreal	10–0	7–1–2	8–1–1	—	9–1	4–5–1
New York	3–4–3	3–3–4	2–6–2	1–9	—	2–7–1
Toronto	5–5	6–3–1	1–8–1	5–4–1	7–2–1	—

== Schedule and results ==
1944–45 regular season
October

Game	Date	Visitor	Score	Home	Record	Points
1	October 29	Toronto Maple Leafs	11–5	Chicago Black Hawks	0–1–0	0

November

Game	Date	Visitor	Score	Home	Record	Points
2	November 1	New York Rangers	3–8	Chicago Black Hawks	1–1–0	2
3	November 5	Boston Bruins	6–3	Chicago Black Hawks	1–2–0	2
4	November 9	Chicago Black Hawks	2–9	Montreal Canadiens	1–3–0	2
5	November 12	Montreal Canadiens	4–2	Chicago Black Hawks	1–4–0	2
6	November 14	Chicago Black Hawks	5–7	Boston Bruins	1–5–0	2
7	November 18	Chicago Black Hawks	4–5	Toronto Maple Leafs	1–6–0	2
8	November 19	Toronto Maple Leafs	4–3	Chicago Black Hawks	1–7–0	2
9	November 23	New York Rangers	4–4	Chicago Black Hawks	1–7–1	3
10	November 25	Chicago Black Hawks	4–7	Detroit Red Wings	1–8–1	3
11	November 26	Detroit Red Wings	5–6	Chicago Black Hawks	2–8–1	5
12	November 30	Boston Bruins	7–2	Chicago Black Hawks	2–9–1	5

December

Game	Date	Visitor	Score	Home	Record	Points
13	December 3	Montreal Canadiens	2–1	Chicago Black Hawks	2–10–1	5
14	December 10	Chicago Black Hawks	1–1	New York Rangers	2–10–2	6
15	December 17	Detroit Red Wings	1–2	Chicago Black Hawks	3–10–2	8
16	December 20	New York Rangers	3–1	Chicago Black Hawks	3–11–2	8
17	December 23	Chicago Black Hawks	1–2	Montreal Canadiens	3–12–2	8
18	December 24	Chicago Black Hawks	3–3	New York Rangers	3–12–3	9
19	December 28	Chicago Black Hawks	1–2	Boston Bruins	3–13–3	9
20	December 30	Chicago Black Hawks	0–4	Toronto Maple Leafs	3–14–3	9
21	December 31	Chicago Black Hawks	2–6	Detroit Red Wings	3–15–3	9

January

Game	Date	Visitor	Score	Home	Record	Points
22	January 1	Detroit Red Wings	4–2	Chicago Black Hawks	3–16–3	9
23	January 6	Chicago Black Hawks	1–10	Montreal Canadiens	3–17–3	9
24	January 7	Chicago Black Hawks	0–0	New York Rangers	3–17–4	10
25	January 14	Boston Bruins	1–4	Chicago Black Hawks	4–17–4	12
26	January 17	Montreal Canadiens	4–2	Chicago Black Hawks	4–18–4	12
27	January 20	Chicago Black Hawks	4–8	Toronto Maple Leafs	4–19–4	12
28	January 21	Toronto Maple Leafs	0–4	Chicago Black Hawks	5–19–4	14
29	January 24	New York Rangers	4–3	Chicago Black Hawks	5–20–4	14
30	January 27	Chicago Black Hawks	1–5	Detroit Red Wings	5–21–4	14
31	January 28	Detroit Red Wings	4–2	Chicago Black Hawks	5–22–4	14
32	January 30	Chicago Black Hawks	5–3	Boston Bruins	6–22–4	16

February

Game	Date	Visitor	Score	Home	Record	Points
33	February 1	Chicago Black Hawks	1–1	Montreal Canadiens	6–22–5	17
34	February 4	Toronto Maple Leafs	4–3	Chicago Black Hawks	6–23–5	17
35	February 10	Chicago Black Hawks	2–1	Toronto Maple Leafs	7–23–5	19
36	February 11	Toronto Maple Leafs	1–2	Chicago Black Hawks	8–23–5	21
37	February 13	Chicago Black Hawks	2–3	Boston Bruins	8–24–5	21
38	February 15	Chicago Black Hawks	2–6	New York Rangers	8–25–5	21
39	February 18	Montreal Canadiens	0–0	Chicago Black Hawks	8–25–6	22
40	February 21	Boston Bruins	0–5	Chicago Black Hawks	9–25–6	24
41	February 24	Chicago Black Hawks	2–4	Detroit Red Wings	9–26–6	24
42	February 25	Detroit Red Wings	3–1	Chicago Black Hawks	9–27–6	24
43	February 27	Chicago Black Hawks	3–3	Toronto Maple Leafs	9–27–7	25

March

Game	Date	Visitor	Score	Home	Record	Points
44	March 1	Chicago Black Hawks	5–3	New York Rangers	10–27–7	27
45	March 4	Montreal Canadiens	4–6	Chicago Black Hawks	11–27–7	29
46	March 7	New York Rangers	3–6	Chicago Black Hawks	12–27–7	31
47	March 11	Chicago Black Hawks	2–7	Boston Bruins	12–28–7	31
48	March 15	Boston Bruins	5–3	Chicago Black Hawks	12–29–7	31
49	March 17	Chicago Black Hawks	3–4	Montreal Canadiens	12–30–7	31
50	March 18	Chicago Black Hawks	5–3	Detroit Red Wings	13–30–7	33

Legend: Win (2 points) Loss (0 points) Tie (1 point)

== Season stats ==
=== Scoring leaders ===
Player	GP	G	A	Pts	PIM
Bill Mosienko	50	28	26	54	0
Clint Smith	50	23	31	54	0
Pete Horeck	50	20	16	36	44
Joe Cooper	50	4	17	21	50
Butch McDonald	26	6	13	19	0

=== Goaltending ===
Player	GP	TOI	W	L	T	GA	SO	GAA
Doug Stevenson	2	120	1	1	0	7	0	3.50
Mike Karakas	48	2880	12	29	7	187	4	3.90
