= Armand Gaudreault =

Canadian ice hockey player (1921–2013)

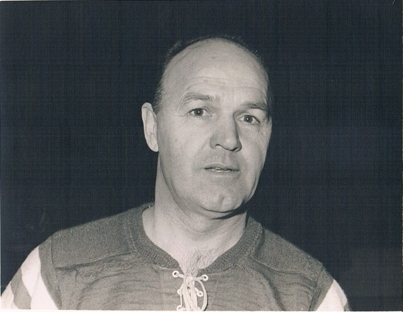
- Born: July 14, 1921; Saint-Félicien, Quebec, Canada
- Died: July 2, 2013 (aged 91); Quebec City, Quebec, Canada
- Height: 5 ft 9 in (175 cm)
- Weight: 155 lb (70 kg; 11 st 1 lb)
- Position: Left wing
- Shot: Left
- Played for: Boston Bruins
- Playing career: 1940–1952

Armand Gérard Gaudreault (July 14, 1921 – July 2, 2013) was a Canadian ice hockey player. He played 44 games in the National Hockey League with the Boston Bruins during the 1944–45 season. The rest of his career, which lasted from 1940 to 1952, was spent in the Quebec Senior Hockey League and the American Hockey League. Gaudreault was born in Lac Saint-Jean, Quebec.

== Playing career ==
Gaudreault began his professional career with the Quebec Aces of the Quebec Senior Hockey League in 1940. In 1944, he signed with the Boston Bruins of the National Hockey League and played 44 games, scoring 15 goals and 24 points in his one and only season in the NHL. Afterwards he had two highly productive seasons with the American Hockey League's Hershey Bears, with 21 and 23 goals in respective seasons. He would eventually return to the Aces in 1949 and would remain with the team until his retirement in 1952.

== Later life ==
Gaudreault died in Quebec City on July 2, 2013, at the age of 91.

== Career statistics ==
=== Regular season and playoffs ===
			Regular season					Playoffs
Season	Team	League	GP	G	A	Pts	PIM	GP	G	A	Pts	PIM
1940–41	Quebec Aces	QSHL	33	11	12	23	23	4	0	0	0	2
1941–42	Quebec Aces	QSHL	40	19	25	44	19	7	3	2	5	4
1941–42	Quebec Aces	Al-Cup	—	—	—	—	—	8	4	5	9	2
1942–43	Quebec Morton Aces	QSHL	34	16	26	42	4	6	0	2	2	2
1943–44	Quebec Aces	QSHL	25	18	28	46	21	6	4	3	7	4
1943–44	Quebec Aces	Al-Cup	—	—	—	—	—	9	6	3	9	6
1944–45	Boston Bruins	NHL	44	15	9	24	27	7	0	2	2	8
1945–46	Hershey Bears	AHL	47	21	24	45	42	3	1	0	1	4
1946–47	Hershey Bears	AHL	61	23	31	54	34	11	3	3	6	10
1946–47	Quebec Aces	QSHL	1	0	0	0	0	—	—	—	—	—
1947–48	Hershey Bears	AHL	17	10	11	21	6	2	1	0	1	15
1947–48	Sherbrooke Saints	QPHL	10	10	15	25	22	—	—	—	—	—
1948–49	Quebec Aces	QSHL	1	1	1	2	0	1	0	0	0	2
1949–50	Quebec Aces	QSHL	60	31	32	63	48	12	9	6	15	6
1950–51	Quebec Aces	QSHL	56	24	27	51	16	19	7	10	17	9
1951–52	Quebec Aces	QSHL	60	29	28	57	52	6	3	4	7	4
QSHL totals			310	149	179	328	183	61	26	27	53	33
NHL totals			44	15	9	24	27	7	0	2	2	8
