= Jean-Paul Gladu =

Canadian ice hockey player

- Born: June 20, 1921; Saint-Hyacinthe, Quebec, Canada
- Died: February 1, 2015 (aged 93); Saint-Hyacinthe, Quebec, Canada
- Height: 5 ft 11 in (180 cm)
- Weight: 180 lb (82 kg; 12 st 12 lb)
- Position: Left wing
- Shot: Left
- Played for: Boston Bruins
- Playing career: 1944–1956

Antonio Jean-Paul Gladu (June 20, 1921 — February 1, 2015) was a Canadian professional ice hockey player who played 40 games in the National Hockey League. Born in St-Hyacinthe, Quebec, he played with the Boston Bruins. He died in 2015, aged 93.

== Career statistics ==
=== Regular season and playoffs ===
			Regular season					Playoffs
Season	Team	League	GP	G	A	Pts	PIM	GP	G	A	Pts	PIM
1939–40	Verdun Maple Leafs	QJAHA	11	5	3	8	4	4	5	0	5	0
1939–40	Verdun Maple Leafs	M-Cup	—	—	—	—	—	6	3	2	5	6
1940–41	Shawinigan Falls Cataracts	QSHL	36	27	41	68	42	10	4	3	7	6
1941–42	Shawinigan Falls Cataracts	MDSL	28	13	24	37	37	10	3	10	13	0
1942–43	Quebec Sea Gulls	QCHL	—	—	—	—	—	10	13	20	33	—
1943–44	Quebec Sea Gulls	QCHL	—	—	—	—	—	—	—	—	—	—
1944–45	Boston Bruins	NHL	40	6	14	20	2	7	2	2	4	0
1945–46	Hershey Bears	AHL	4	0	1	1	4	—	—	—	—	—
1945–46	St. Louis Flyers	AHL	40	19	23	42	14	—	—	—	—	—
1946–47	St. Louis Flyers	AHL	62	30	19	49	48	—	—	—	—	—
1947–48	St. Louis Flyers	AHL	67	34	47	81	24	—	—	—	—	—
1948–49	St. Louis Flyers	AHL	67	51	34	85	28	7	3	0	3	0
1949–50	St. Louis Flyers	AHL	38	19	19	38	4	2	0	1	1	0
1950–51	St. Louis Flyers	AHL	66	25	25	50	10	—	—	—	—	—
1951–52	Cleveland Barons	AHL	23	7	12	19	2	—	—	—	—	—
1951–52	Providence Reds	AHL	43	24	21	45	28	15	8	7	15	16
1952–53	Providence Reds	AHL	63	21	25	46	46	—	—	—	—	—
1953–54	Providence Reds	AHL	49	8	20	28	22	—	—	—	—	—
1955–56	Trois-Rivières Lions	QHL	5	0	3	3	8	—	—	—	—	—
AHL totals			522	238	246	484	230	24	11	8	19	16
NHL totals			40	6	14	20	2	7	2	2	4	0
