= 1934 Memorial Cup =

Canadian junior ice hockey championship

The Memorial Cup trophy

The 1934 Memorial Cup final was the 16th junior ice hockey championship of the Canadian Amateur Hockey Association. The George Richardson Memorial Trophy champions Toronto St. Michael's Majors of the Ontario Hockey Association in Eastern Canada competed against the Abbott Cup champions Edmonton Athletics of the Edmonton Junior Hockey League in Western Canada. In a best-of-three series, held at Shea's Amphitheatre in Winnipeg, Manitoba, St. Michael's won their 1st Memorial Cup, defeating Edmonton 2 games to 0.

== Scores ==
- Game 1: St. Michael's 5-0 Edmonton
- Game 2: St. Michael's 6-4 Edmonton

== Winning roster ==
John Acheson, Bobby Bauer, Frank Bauer, J.J. Burke, Mickey Drouillard, John Hamilton, Reg Hamilton, Art Jackson, Pep Kelly, Nick Metz, Leo McLean, Harvey Teno, Don Willson. Coach: Dr. W.J. LaFlamme
