= Gus Bodnar =

Canadian ice hockey player (1923–2005)

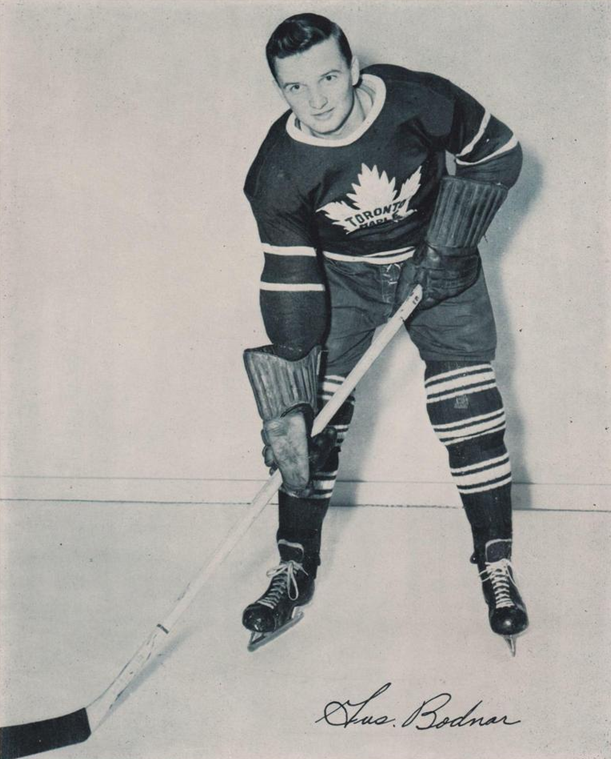
- Bodnar in 1940s card
- Born: April 24, 1923 Fort William, Ontario, Canada
- Died: July 1, 2005 (aged 82) Oshawa, Ontario, Canada
- Height: 5 ft 10 in (178 cm)
- Weight: 160 lb (73 kg; 11 st 6 lb)
- Position: Centre
- Shot: Right
- Played for: Toronto Maple Leafs; Chicago Black Hawks; Boston Bruins
- Playing career: 1943–1955

August Bodnar (April 24, 1923 – July 1, 2005) was a Canadian professional ice hockey centre who was the Calder Memorial Trophy winner as the National Hockey League's rookie of the year for the 1943–44 season. He played 12 seasons in the NHL from 1943 to 1955, for the Toronto Maple Leafs, Chicago Black Hawks and Boston Bruins.

== Playing career ==
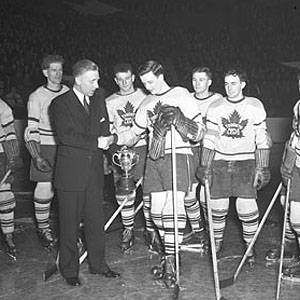
NHL president Red Dutton shown presenting the Calder Memorial Trophy to Bodnar in 1944.

A native of Fort William, Ontario, Bodnar started his career with the local Fort William Rangers of the Thunder Bay Junior A Hockey League. He played for the Rangers for three seasons from 1941 to 1943 and competed for the Memorial Cup twice in 1941–42 and 1942–43.

After leading the TBJHL in points in 1942–43, Bodnar joined the Toronto Maple Leafs. On October 30, 1943, Bodnar scored his first ever NHL goal 15 seconds into his first NHL game, setting the record for the fastest goal by a player in his first NHL game. Bodnar scored 62 points during the regular season, a career-best, and he beat Montreal Canadiens rookie goaltender Bill Durnan in voting for the Calder Memorial Trophy in 1943–44. He spent four more seasons with the Maple Leafs and won two Stanley Cups in 1944–45 and 1946–47. Bodnar had 40 assists in his rookie season in 1943–44, which would set a record for assists by a Maple Leafs rookie until surpassed by Mitch Marner in 2016–17.

In 1947–48, Bodnar and fellow linemates Gaye Stewart, Ernie Dickens, Bud Poile and Bob Goldham were traded to the Chicago Black Hawks in exchange for Max Bentley and Cy Thomas. Bodnar remained in Chicago for seven seasons from 1947 to 1954. He also played in the NHL All-Star Game in 1950–51. On March 23, 1952, Bodnar set another NHL record by recording three assists in 21 seconds. With that record, he also helped teammate Bill Mosienko set the record for fastest hat-trick in NHL history In 1953–54, Bodnar was traded to the Boston Bruins midway through the season. He would remain with the Bruins for one more season in 1954–55, before retiring.

== Coaching career ==
Bodnar retired from playing hockey in 1955 but later came back to coach. Bodnar coached in the Boston farm system with the Lakeshore Bruins in the Metro Jr.B league, they won the League Championship in 57/58 and went to the OHA Jr.B Championship round. He was the coach and manager of the Toronto Marlboros from 1967 to 1968. He coached the Marlboros to a Memorial Cup championship in 1966–67. In 1970, Bodnar was named head coach of the Salt Lake Golden Eagles in the WHL. He remained there for one season before signing on as head coach of the Oshawa Generals in the OHA from 1971 to 1976. He was the recipient of the OHA Coach of the Year Award in 1971–72.

== Legacy ==
Bodnar was elected to the Northwestern Ontario Sports Hall of Fame in 1983, and the Oshawa Sports Hall of Fame in 1995. On July 1, 2005, Bodnar died at the Lakeridge Health Unit in Oshawa, Ontario.

== Awards and achievements ==
- Calder Memorial Trophy winner in 1944.
- Stanley Cup champion in 1945 and 1947.
- Played in 1951 NHL All-Star Game.
- Memorial Cup champion in 1967 (as head coach).
- OHA Coach of the Year award winner in 1972.
- Inducted into the Northwestern Ontario Sports Hall of Fame in 1983.
- Inducted into the Oshawa Sports Hall of Fame in 1995.

== Records ==
- On October 30, 1943, in his first game, Bodnar scored a goal 15 seconds into the game, setting the record for fastest goal by a player in his first NHL game.
- On March 23, 1952, Bodnar set an NHL record for recording 3 assists in 21 seconds.
- Record rookie assists 1943–44 season (surpassed in 2017 by Mitch Marner with 42 assists)

== Career statistics ==
			Regular season					Playoffs
Season	Team	League	GP	G	A	Pts	PIM	GP	G	A	Pts	PIM
1940–41	Fort William Rangers	TBJHL	18	13	8	21	12	2	0	0	0	0
1941–42	Fort William Rangers	TBJHL	16	20	16	36	22	3	5	4	9	2
1941–42	Fort William Rangers	M-Cup	—	—	—	—	—	3	2	5	7	16
1942–43	Fort William Rangers	TBJHL	9	10	29	39	9	3	2	3	5	2
1942–43	Fort William Rangers	M-Cup	—	—	—	—	—	3	2	1	3	2
1943–44	Toronto Maple Leafs	NHL	50	22	40	62	18	5	0	0	0	0
1944–45	Toronto Maple Leafs	NHL	49	8	36	44	18	13	3	1	4	4
1945–46	Toronto Maple Leafs	NHL	49	14	23	37	14	—	—	—	—	—
1946–47	Toronto Maple Leafs	NHL	39	4	6	10	10	1	0	0	0	0
1946–47	Pittsburgh Hornets	AHL	15	10	9	19	10	9	2	2	4	4
1947–48	Pittsburgh Hornets	AHL	6	2	3	5	0	—	—	—	—	—
1947–48	Chicago Black Hawks	NHL	46	13	22	35	23	—	—	—	—	—
1948–49	Chicago Black Hawks	NHL	59	19	26	45	14	—	—	—	—	—
1949–50	Chicago Black Hawks	NHL	70	11	28	39	6	—	—	—	—	—
1950–51	Chicago Black Hawks	NHL	44	8	12	20	8	—	—	—	—	—
1951–52	Chicago Black Hawks	NHL	69	14	26	40	26	—	—	—	—	—
1952–53	Chicago Black Hawks	NHL	66	16	13	29	26	7	1	1	2	2
1953–54	Chicago Black Hawks	NHL	45	6	15	21	20	—	—	—	—	—
1953–54	Boston Bruins	NHL	14	3	3	6	10	1	0	0	0	0
1954–55	Boston Bruins	NHL	67	4	4	8	14	5	0	1	1	4
NHL totals			667	142	254	396	207	32	4	3	7	10
AHL totals			21	12	12	24	10	9	2	2	4	4

== Transactions ==
- November 2, 1947 - Traded to the Chicago Black Hawks by the Toronto Maple Leafs with Bud Poile, Gaye Stewart, Ernie Dickens and Bob Goldham for Max Bentley and Cy Thomas.
- February 16, 1954 - Traded to the Boston Bruins by the Chicago Black Hawks for Jerry Toppazzini.

Preceded by Gaye Stewart	Winner of the Calder Memorial Trophy; 1944	Succeeded by Frank McCool
