= Reg Hamilton =

Canadian ice hockey player and coach

- Born: April 29, 1914 Toronto, Ontario, Canada
- Died: June 12, 1991 (aged 77)
- Height: 5 ft 11 in (180 cm)
- Weight: 180 lb (82 kg; 12 st 12 lb)
- Position: Defence
- Shot: Left
- Played for: Toronto Maple Leafs; Chicago Black Hawks
- Playing career: 1934–1948

Reginald James Hamilton (April 29, 1914 – June 12, 1991) was a Canadian ice hockey player and coach. Hamilton played in the National Hockey League (NHL) with the Toronto Maple Leafs and Chicago Black Hawks between 1935 and 1946. He won the Stanley Cup twice with the Maple Leafs, in 1942 and 1945.

== Playing career ==
Hamilton started his National Hockey League career with the Toronto Maple Leafs in 1935. He also played with the Chicago Black Hawks for two seasons, 1945–1947. He was a player and head coach of the Kansas City Pla-Mors 1947–48 of the USHL, was the head coach for the Pla-Mors 1948–49, and retired from hockey for a few years before returning to Toronto to take over as the head coach of the Toronto Marlboroughs 1953–54.

== Career statistics ==
=== Regular season and playoffs ===
			Regular season					Playoffs
Season	Team	League	GP	G	A	Pts	PIM	GP	G	A	Pts	PIM
1930–31	Toronto Marlboros	OHA	8	2	1	3	8	2	0	0	0	4
1931–32	Toronto Marlboros	OHA	10	5	3	8	10	4	0	0	0	18
1932–33	Toronto Marlboros	OHA	10	3	3	6	45	3	0	0	0	12
1933–34	St. Michael's Majors	OHA	5	2	1	3	12	3	0	2	2	12
1933–34	Toronto CCM	TMHL	2	0	0	0	6	—	—	—	—	—
1933–34	St. Michael's Majors	M-Cup	—	—	—	—	—	13	4	12	16	46
1934–35	Syracuse Stars	IHL	40	4	4	8	38	2	0	0	0	2
1935–36	Toronto Maple Leafs	NHL	7	0	0	0	0	—	—	—	—	—
1935–36	Syracuse Stars	IHL	40	4	19	23	86	3	0	1	1	2
1936–37	Toronto Maple Leafs	NHL	39	3	7	10	32	2	0	1	1	2
1936–37	Syracuse Stars	IAHL	9	0	3	3	12	—	—	—	—	—
1937–38	Toronto Maple Leafs	NHL	45	1	4	5	43	7	0	1	1	2
1938–39	Toronto Maple Leafs	NHL	48	0	7	7	54	10	0	2	2	4
1939–40	Toronto Maple Leafs	NHL	23	2	2	4	23	10	0	0	0	0
1940–41	Toronto Maple Leafs	NHL	46	3	12	15	59	7	1	2	3	13
1941–42	Toronto Maple Leafs	NHL	22	0	4	4	27	—	—	—	—	—
1942–43	Toronto Maple Leafs	NHL	48	4	17	21	68	6	1	1	2	9
1943–44	Toronto Maple Leafs	NHL	39	4	12	16	32	5	1	0	1	8
1944–45	Toronto Maple Leafs	NHL	50	3	12	15	41	13	0	0	0	6
1945–46	Chicago Black Hawks	NHL	48	1	7	8	31	4	0	1	1	2
1946–47	Chicago Black Hawks	NHL	10	0	3	3	2	—	—	—	—	—
1946–47	Kansas City Pla-Mors	USHL	26	0	10	10	30	10	0	3	3	0
1947–48	Kansas City Pla-Mors	USHL	14	0	2	2	6	—	—	—	—	—
NHL totals			425	21	87	108	412	64	3	8	11	46
