= Jack McGill (ice hockey, born 1921) =

Canadian ice hockey player (1921–1994)

- Born: September 19, 1921; Edmonton, Alberta, Canada
- Died: January 13, 1994 (aged 72)
- Height: 6 ft 1 in (185 cm)
- Weight: 180 lb (82 kg; 12 st 12 lb)
- Position: Centre
- Shot: Left
- Played for: Boston Bruins
- Playing career: 1941–1954

John George "Big Jack" McGill (September 19, 1921 – January 13, 1994) was a Canadian professional ice hockey player. He played with the Boston Bruins of the National Hockey League between 1942 and 1947. The rest of his career, which lasted from 1941 to 1954, was spent in various minor leagues.

== Playing career ==
Born in Edmonton, Alberta, McGill registered 19 points in his first 13 games with the Boston Bruins of the National Hockey League. He spent parts of two more seasons with the Bruins, finishing the remainder of his career in the AHL and other minor leagues. In 97 regular season NHL games, McGill recorded 23 goals and 36 assists for 59 points.

== Career statistics ==
=== Regular season and playoffs ===
			Regular season					Playoffs
Season	Team	League	GP	G	A	Pts	PIM	GP	G	A	Pts	PIM
1937–38	Edmonton Athletic Club	EJrHL	1	0	1	1	0	—	—	—	—	—
1938–39	Edmonton Athletic Club	EJrHL	11	12	5	17	11	—	—	—	—	—
1938–39	Edmonton Athletic Club	M-Cup	—	—	—	—	—	2	3	2	5	0
1939–40	Edmonton Athletic Club	EJrHL	14	—	—	—	34	4	3	3	6	4
1939–40	Edmonton Athletic Club	M-Cup	—	—	—	—	—	14	14	14	28	16
1941–42	Boston Olympics	EAHL	36	34	34	68	50	1	1	0	1	2
1941–42	Boston Bruins	NHL	13	8	11	19	2	5	4	1	5	6
1942–43	Ottawa Army	OCHL	11	9	6	15	10	—	—	—	—	—
1942–43	Ottawa Commandos	QSHL	10	4	6	10	18	2	0	0	0	15
1942–43	Ottawa Commandos	Al-Cup	—	—	—	—	—	2	0	2	2	2
1943–44	Winnipeg RCAF	WNDHL	1	0	0	0	0	—	—	—	—	—
1944–45	Boston Bruins	NHL	14	4	2	6	0	7	3	3	6	0
1944–45	Boston Olympics	EAHL	7	4	13	17	22	1	2	0	2	5
1945–46	Boston Bruins	NHL	46	6	14	20	21	10	0	0	0	0
1946–47	Boston Bruins	NHL	24	5	9	14	19	5	0	0	0	11
1946–47	Hershey Bears	AHL	36	21	28	49	57	—	—	—	—	—
1947–48	Hershey Bears	AHL	64	21	47	68	82	2	0	2	2	2
1948–49	Houston Huskies	USHL	3	0	3	3	6	—	—	—	—	—
1948–49	Buffalo Bisons	AHL	4	0	2	2	0	—	—	—	—	—
1948–49	Providence Reds	AHL	49	27	45	72	68	14	2	12	14	15
1949–50	Providence Reds	AHL	66	24	58	82	67	4	1	2	3	4
1950–51	Providence Reds	AHL	69	29	69	98	58	—	—	—	—	—
1951–52	Providence Reds	AHL	50	19	42	61	36	15	1	4	5	27
1952–53	Edmonton Flyers	WHL	13	1	1	2	30	—	—	—	—	—
1953–54	New Westminster Royals	WHL	7	2	2	4	8	5	1	0	1	4
AHL totals			338	141	291	432	368	35	4	20	24	48
NHL totals			97	23	36	59	42	27	7	4	11	17
