= Nils Tremblay =

Canadian ice hockey player

- Born: July 26, 1922; La Malbaie, Quebec, Canada
- Died: July 26, 1971 (aged 49); Quebec City, Quebec, Canada
- Height: 5 ft 8 in (173 cm)
- Weight: 175 lb (79 kg; 12 st 7 lb)
- Position: Center
- Shot: Left
- Played for: Montreal Canadiens
- Playing career: 1941–1954

Lionel Louis "Nils" Tremblay (July 26, 1922 – July 26, 1971) was a Canadian professional ice hockey forward. He played 1 regular season game and 2 playoff games in the National Hockey League for the Montreal Canadiens during the 1944–45 season. The rest of his career, which lasted from 1941 to 1954, was mainly spent in the Quebec Senior Hockey League.

== Career ==
Tremblay's career began in 1941, where he was signed by the Quebec Aces. In his only game with the Aces during the 1941–42 season, Tremblay was scoreless. Tremblay would remain with the Aces until the 1943–44 season. The following season, Tremblay was signed by the Montreal Canadiens on November 14, 1944. In his debut game with the Canadiens, Tremblay recorded his first and only point with the team (an assist.) Tremblay would later be recalled one more time with the Canadiens during the 1945–46 season but would be held scoreless over two games.

As a member of the Quebec Senior Hockey League, Tremblay was often a point per game player. He finished as high as second overall in the league scoring race during the 1948–49 season and his 71 assists led the league and earned him a place on the QSHL's Second All-Star Team. Upon the completion of his QSHL career in 1950, Tremblay totaled 361 points in 237 games (an average of 1.52 PPG.)

== Death ==
Tremblay died on July 26, 1971, his 49th birthday.

== Career statistics ==
=== Regular season and playoffs ===
			Regular season					Playoffs
Season	Team	League	GP	G	A	Pts	PIM	GP	G	A	Pts	PIM
1941–42	Quebec Aces	QSHL	1	0	0	0	0	—	—	—	—	—
1942–43	Quebec Morton Aces	QSHL	17	8	6	14	8	—	—	—	—	—
1943–44	Quebec Aces	QSHL	25	19	28	47	15	6	5	4	9	2
1944–45	Montreal Canadiens	NHL	1	0	1	1	0	2	0	0	0	0
1944–45	Hull-Quebec	QSHL	21	23	31	54	37	7	4	5	9	2
1944–45	Quebec Aces	Al-Cup	—	—	—	—	—	3	2	4	6	2
1945–46	Quebec Aces	QSHL	32	19	20	39	51	6	3	5	8	18
1946–47	Quebec Aces	QSHL	37	25	35	60	43	4	3	5	8	10
1947–48	Quebec Aces	QSHL	2	0	2	2	2	—	—	—	—	—
1947–48	Seattle Ironmen	PCHL	3	0	2	2	10	—	—	—	—	—
1948–49	Ottawa Senators	QSHL	60	35	71	106	51	11	3	7	10	8
1948–49	Ottawa Senators	Al-Cup	—	—	—	—	—	12	11	9	20	2
1949–50	Ottawa Senators	QSHL	59	15	38	53	69	7	4	4	8	4
1950–51	Ottawa Senators	QSHL	52	21	29	50	22	11	2	2	4	4
1951–52	Sherbrooke Saints	QMHL	47	9	28	37	21	9	2	3	5	0
1952–53	Sherbrooke Saints	QMHL	46	13	18	31	21	7	0	5	5	2
1953–54	Rivière-du-Loup Raiders	SLSHL	57	15	33	48	8	—	—	—	—	—
QSHL totals			306	165	260	425	298	52	24	32	56	48
NHL totals			1	0	1	1	0	2	0	0	0	0

== Awards ==
=== QSHL ===
League leader, Assists (1949)
Second Team All-Star (1949)

=== Allan Cup ===
Champion (1944, 1949)
