= Art Jackson =

Canadian ice hockey player

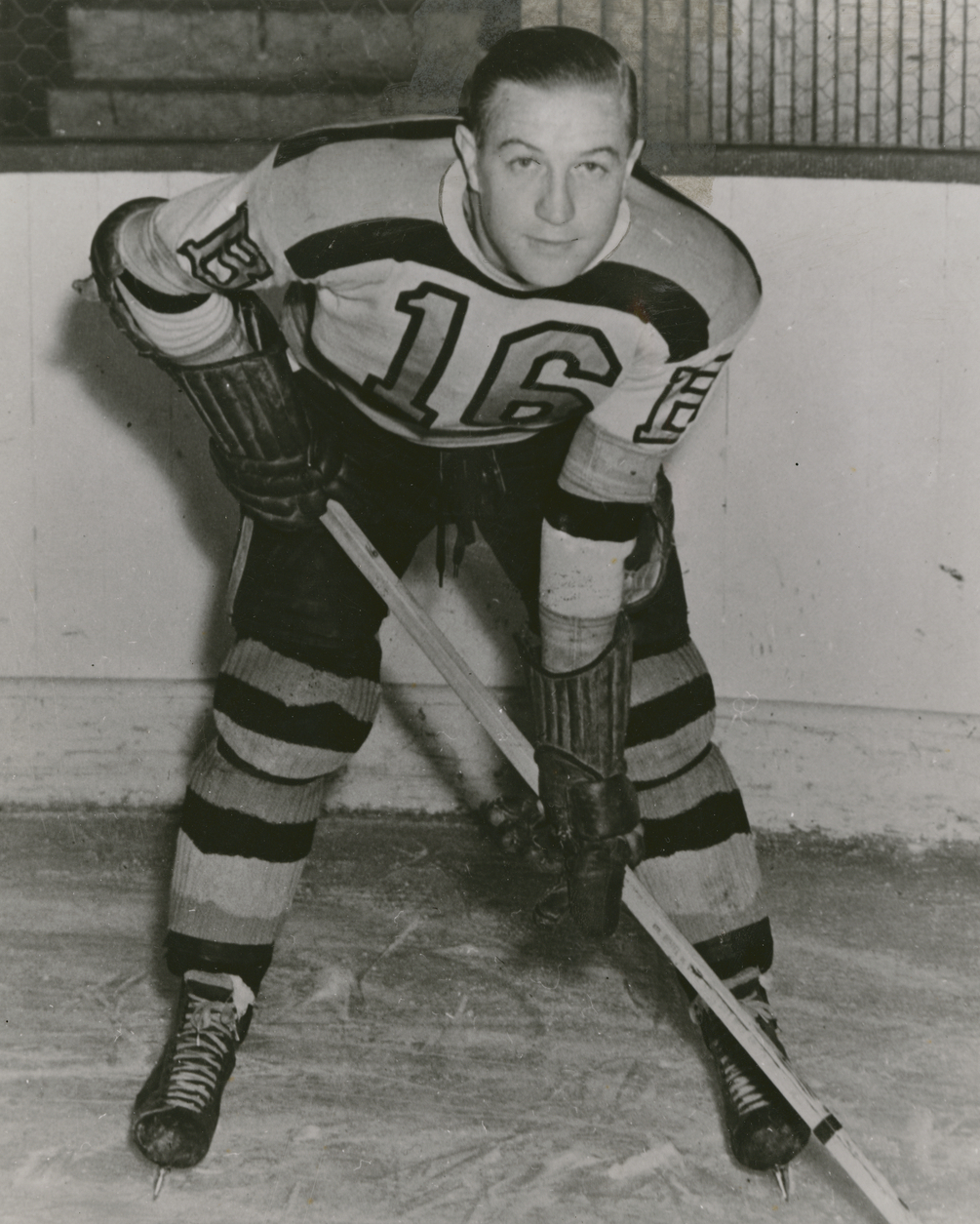
- Born: December 15, 1915 Toronto, Ontario, Canada
- Died: May 15, 1971 (aged 55) St. Catharines, Ontario, Canada
- Height: 5 ft 9 in (175 cm)
- Weight: 160 lb (73 kg; 11 st 6 lb)
- Position: Centre
- Shot: Left
- Played for: Toronto Maple Leafs; Boston Bruins; New York Americans
- Playing career: 1934–1945

Arthur Morris Jackson (December 15, 1915 – May 15, 1971) was a Canadian ice hockey player. He played in the National Hockey League with the Toronto Maple Leafs, Boston Bruins, and New York Americans between 1934 and 1945. He won the Stanley Cup twice during his career, in 1941 with Boston, and in 1945 with Toronto. His brother, Harvey "Busher" Jackson also played in the NHL, and was inducted into the Hockey Hall of Fame.

== Playing career ==
A native of Toronto, Ontario, Jackson played junior with the Toronto Marlboros and Toronto St. Michael's Majors. He won the 1934 Memorial Cup, the Canadian junior hockey championship, with St. Michael's. Jackson made his NHL debut in 1934 with the Toronto Maple Leafs, and played for them until 1937. He joined the Boston Bruins for one season before playing 1938–39 with the New York Americans. Jackson returned to Boston in 1939, and spent six seasons there. He spent the final part of the 1944–45 season back with Toronto, and retired, though returned to play two games of senior hockey in 1946–47.

== Post-playing career ==
After retiring from playing hockey Jackson moved to St. Catharines, Ontario, where he became a hockey coach for the OHA and later worked for the Port Weller Dry Docks Ltd. On May 15, 1971, Jackson suffered a heart attack and died while playing golf in the Opening Day Tournament at the St. Catharines Golf Club, at the age of 55.

== Career statistics ==
=== Regular season and playoffs ===
			Regular season					Playoffs
Season	Team	League	GP	G	A	Pts	PIM	GP	G	A	Pts	PIM
1931–32	Toronto Marlboros	OHA	3	0	0	0	0	—	—	—	—	—
1932–33	Toronto Marlboros	OHA	9	7	5	12	10	3	2	0	5	6
1933–34	Toronto St. Michael's Majors	OHA	12	23	13	36	6	3	4	2	6	6
1933–34	Toronto CCM	TMHL	7	5	3	8	4	—	—	—	—	—
1933–34	Toronto St. Michael's Majors	M-Cup	—	—	—	—	—	13	21	15	36	26
1934–35	Toronto Maple Leafs	NHL	20	1	3	4	4	1	0	0	0	2
1934–35	Syracuse Stars	IHL	24	13	12	25	0	2	1	0	1	0
1935–36	Toronto Maple Leafs	NHL	48	5	15	20	14	8	0	3	3	2
1935–36	Syracuse Stars	IHL	1	0	0	0	0	—	—	—	—	—
1936–37	Toronto Maple Leafs	NHL	14	2	0	2	2	—	—	—	—	—
1936–37	Syracuse Stars	IAHL	30	17	21	38	37	9	1	3	4	0
1937–38	Boston Bruins	NHL	48	9	3	12	24	3	0	0	0	0
1938–39	New York Americans	NHL	48	12	13	25	15	2	0	0	0	2
1939–40	Boston Bruins	NHL	46	7	18	25	6	5	1	2	3	0
1940–41	Boston Bruins	NHL	48	17	15	32	10	11	1	3	4	16
1941–42	Boston Bruins	NHL	47	6	18	24	25	5	0	1	1	0
1942–43	Boston Bruins	NHL	50	22	31	53	20	9	6	3	9	7
1943–44	Boston Bruins	NHL	49	28	41	69	8	—	—	—	—	—
1944–45	Boston Bruins	NHL	19	5	8	13	10	—	—	—	—	—
1944–45	Toronto Maple Leafs	NHL	31	9	13	22	6	8	0	0	0	0
1946–47	Toronto Barkers	TIHL	2	3	1	4	0	—	—	—	—	—
NHL totals			468	123	178	301	144	52	8	12	20	29

== See also ==
- List of family relations in the NHL
