= Harold Jackson (ice hockey) =

Canadian ice hockey player

- Born: August 1, 1917 Cedar Springs, Ontario, Canada
- Died: January 30, 1997 (aged 79) New Port Richey, Florida, U.S.
- Height: 6 ft 0 in (183 cm)
- Weight: 195 lb (88 kg; 13 st 13 lb)
- Position: Defence
- Shot: Right
- Played for: Detroit Red Wings; Chicago Black Hawks
- Playing career: 1936–1948

Harold Russell "Hal" Jackson (August 1, 1917 — January 30, 1997) was a Canadian ice hockey defenceman who played 219 games in the National Hockey League with Chicago Black Hawks and Detroit Red Wings between 1936 and 1947. He won the Stanley Cup with Chicago in 1938, and Detroit in 1943.

Jackson was born in Cedar Springs, Ontario.

== Career statistics ==
=== Regular season and playoffs ===
			Regular season					Playoffs
Season	Team	League	GP	G	A	Pts	PIM	GP	G	A	Pts	PIM
1933–34	Windsor Wanderers	MOHL	19	1	3	4	10	—	—	—	—	—
1934–35	Windsor Wanderers	MOHL	26	5	3	8	31	5	0	0	0	6
1935–36	Toronto St. Michael's Majors	OHA	8	2	1	3	4	5	0	0	0	8
1936–37	Chicago Black Hawks	NHL	38	1	3	4	6	—	—	—	—	—
1937–38	Chicago Black Hawks	NHL	3	0	0	0	0	1	0	0	0	2
1938–39	Providence Reds	IAHL	51	5	6	11	57	5	0	3	3	6
1939–40	Cleveland Barons	IAHL	20	2	0	3	14	—	—	—	—	—
1939–40	Providence Reds	IAHL	27	2	7	9	24	8	1	1	2	4
1940–41	Providence Reds	AHL	54	3	9	12	49	—	—	—	—	—
1940–41	Detroit Red Wings	NHL	1	0	0	0	0	—	—	—	—	—
1940–41	Indianapolis Capitals	AHL	35	2	7	9	29	—	—	—	—	—
1941–42	Indianapolis Capitals	AHL	56	5	19	24	52	10	2	5	7	8
1942–43	Detroit Red Wings	NHL	4	0	4	4	6	6	0	1	1	4
1942–43	Indianapolis Capitals	AHL	53	9	16	25	30	4	0	3	3	14
1943–44	Detroit Red Wings	NHL	50	7	13	20	76	5	0	0	0	11
1943–44	Indianapolis Capitals	AHL	1	0	1	1	0	—	—	—	—	—
1944–45	Detroit Red Wings	NHL	50	5	6	11	45	14	1	1	2	10
1945–46	Detroit Red Wings	NHL	36	3	4	7	36	5	0	0	0	6
1946–47	Detroit Red Wings	NHL	37	1	5	6	39	—	—	—	—	—
1947–48	Buffalo Bisons	AHL	63	7	30	37	97	8	0	3	3	13
IAHL/AHL totals			360	36	95	131	352	35	3	15	18	45
NHL totals			219	17	35	52	208	31	1	2	3	33
