= Hal Cooper (ice hockey) =

Canadian ice hockey player

- Born: August 29, 1913 New Liskeard, Ontario, Canada
- Died: June 25, 1977 (aged 63)
- Height: 5 ft 5 in (165 cm)
- Weight: 155 lb (70 kg; 11 st 1 lb)
- Position: Right wing
- Shot: Right
- Played for: New York Rangers
- Playing career: 1933–1950

Harold Wallace Cooper (August 29, 1913 – June 25, 1977) was a Canadian ice hockey player. He played 8 games in the National Hockey League with the New York Rangers during the 1944–45 season. The rest of his career, which lasted from 1933 to 1950, was spent in the minor leagues.

== Career ==
Cooper played eight games with the New York Rangers during the 1944-45 NHL season. He was 5'5" tall and weighed 155 lbs. He also played in the American Hockey League for the Providence Reds and the Hershey Bears and also in the United States Hockey League for the Houston Skippers.

== Career statistics ==
=== Regular season and playoffs ===
			Regular season					Playoffs
Season	Team	League	GP	G	A	Pts	PIM	GP	G	A	Pts	PIM
1931–32	Hamilton Victorias	OHA	3	1	2	3	4	3	2	0	2	2
1932–33	Hamilton Victorias	OHA	—	—	—	—	—	—	—	—	—	—
1933–34	Sudbury Cub-Wolves	NBHL	8	7	3	10	17	2	1	4	5	7
1934–35	Falconbridge Falcons	NBHL	8	8	2	10	10	2	0	1	1	0
1935–36	Falconbridge Falcons	NBHL	10	7	7	14	12	3	1	2	3	0
1935–36	Falconbridge Falcons	Al-Cup	—	—	—	—	—	13	5	3	8	4
1936–37	Falconbridge Falcons	NBHL	14	7	3	10	16	4	2	4	6	2
1937–38	Falconbridge Falcons	NBHL	15	3	2	5	22	3	1	2	3	2
1937–38	Falconbridge Falcons	Al-Cup	—	—	—	—	—	9	4	5	9	4
1938–39	Kirkland Lake Blue Devils	GBHL	8	7	12	19	10	2	1	3	4	2
1938–39	Kirkland Lake Blue Devils	Al-Cup	—	—	—	—	—	7	3	4	7	4
1939–40	Kirkland Lake Blue Devils	GBHL	15	20	5	25	16	—	—	—	—	—
1939–40	Kirkland Lake Blue Devils	Al-Cup	—	—	—	—	—	20	11	12	23	14
1940–41	Niagara Falls Cataracts	OHA Sr	32	21	20	41	22	3	0	2	2	2
1941–42	Niagara Falls Cataracts	OHA Sr	25	12	13	25	13	7	7	0	7	6
1942–43	Niagara Falls Cataracts	OHA Sr	22	5	16	21	8	2	2	1	3	2
1943–44	Providence Reds	AHL	51	23	21	44	6	—	—	—	—	—
1944–45	New York Rangers	NHL	8	0	0	0	2	—	—	—	—	—
1944–45	Hershey Bears	AHL	46	24	17	41	9	11	6	6	12	6
1945–46	Hershey Bears	AHL	41	12	8	20	4	—	—	—	—	—
1946–47	Houston Huskies	USHL	9	0	6	6	2	—	—	—	—	—
1948–49	Hamilton Tigers	OHA Sr	27	12	5	17	4	6	1	4	5	4
1949–50	Hamilton Tigers	OHA Sr	13	0	1	1	11	—	—	—	—	—
AHL totals			139	59	46	105	19	11	6	6	12	6
OHA Sr totals			119	50	55	105	58	18	10	7	17	14
NHL totals			8	0	0	0	2	—	—	—	—	—
