= Mud Bruneteau =

Canadian ice hockey player

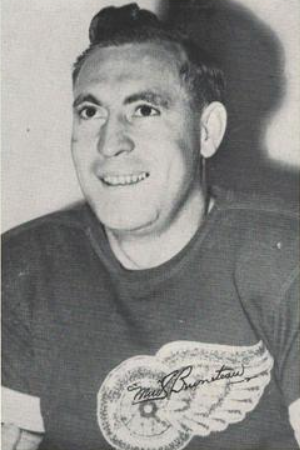
- Born: November 28, 1914 St. Boniface, Manitoba, Canada
- Died: April 15, 1982 (aged 67) Houston, Texas, U.S.
- Height: 5 ft 11 in (180 cm)
- Weight: 185 lb (84 kg; 13 st 3 lb)
- Position: Right wing
- Shot: Right
- Played for: Detroit Red Wings
- Playing career: 1934–1948

Modere Fernand "Mud" Bruneteau (November 28, 1914 – April 15, 1982) was a Canadian professional ice hockey forward who played for the Detroit Red Wings in the National Hockey League between 1935 and 1946. He was teammates for a time with his brother, Ed Bruneteau, and later coached him on the Omaha Knights. Bruneteau scored the winning goal of the longest overtime game in 1936. With the Red Wings Bruneteau won the Stanley Cup three times: in 1936, 1937, and in 1943.

== Playing career ==
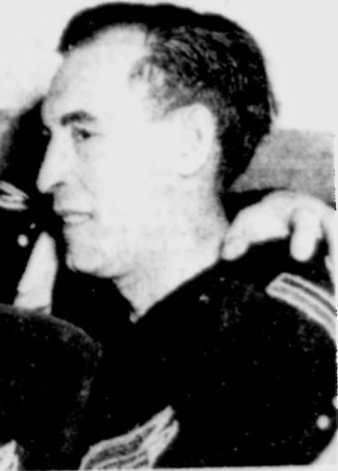
Bruneteau in 1943 photo

Bruneteau is most famous for ending the longest game in NHL playoff history. A rookie, he had been called up to the Red Wings just two weeks earlier and was still trying to adjust to the pace of the NHL when he was thrown into his first playoff series. On March 24, 1936, at the Montreal Forum, against the Montreal Maroons, Mud scored the winning goal at 16:30 of the sixth overtime (116:30 of total overtime) to win the first game of the best-of-five series for Detroit, 1–0. Bruneteau batted a rolling puck past Maroons' goalie Lorne Chabot for the decisive score. Teammate Hec Kilrea was credited with an assist on the play. The game ended at 2:25 a.m. (the length of the game eclipsed the previous record of 104 minutes and 46 seconds of overtime set three years earlier in a 1933 series between the Toronto Maple Leafs and Boston Bruins). Detroit swept the series versus the Maroons in three straight games and went on to win the Stanley Cup. Bruneteau had his best season in 1943–44 when he scored 35 goals in 39 games in the 50-game NHL season.

After his playing career was over, he became a successful minor league coach, leading the Omaha Knights to some United States Hockey League championships.

He was suffering from cancer when he traveled to Houston, Texas, for cancer treatment in April 1982. While there, he fell gravely ill and died on April 15, 1982.

== Career statistics ==
=== Regular season and playoffs ===
			Regular season					Playoffs
Season	Team	League	GP	G	A	Pts	PIM	GP	G	A	Pts	PIM
1931–32	Winnipeg K of C	WJrHL	9	2	2	4	4	—	—	—	—	—
1932–33	Winnipeg K of C	WJrHL	11	4	4	8	10	3	3	0	3	2
1933–34	Winnipeg Falcons	MHL	15	13	4	17	11	1	1	0	1	0
1934–35	Detroit Olympics	IHL	38	10	6	16	26	5	0	2	2	0
1935–36	Detroit Red Wings	NHL	24	2	0	2	2	7	2	2	4	0
1935–36	Detroit Olympics	IHL	23	8	9	17	17	—	—	—	—	—
1936–37	Detroit Red Wings	NHL	43	9	7	16	18	10	2	0	2	6
1937–38	Detroit Red Wings	NHL	24	3	6	9	16	—	—	—	—	—
1937–38	Pittsburgh Hornets	IAHL	4	1	4	5	2	2	1	0	1	2
1938–39	Detroit Red Wings	NHL	20	4	7	11	0	1	0	0	0	0
1939–40	Detroit Red Wings	NHL	46	10	14	24	10	5	3	2	5	0
1940–41	Detroit Red Wings	NHL	45	12	17	29	12	9	2	1	3	2
1940–41	Pittsburgh Hornets	AHL	4	1	4	5	2	—	—	—	—	—
1941–42	Detroit Red Wings	NHL	48	14	19	33	8	12	5	1	6	6
1942–43	Detroit Red Wings	NHL	50	23	22	45	2	9	5	4	9	0
1943–44	Detroit Red Wings	NHL	39	35	18	53	4	5	1	2	3	2
1944–45	Detroit Red Wings	NHL	43	23	25	48	6	14	3	2	5	2
1945–46	Detroit Red Wings	NHL	28	6	4	10	2	—	—	—	—	—
1945–46	Indianapolis Capitals	AHL	14	6	10	16	0	5	1	2	3	0
1946–47	Omaha Knights	USHL	16	6	4	10	2	3	0	1	1	0
1947–48	Omaha Knights	USHL	6	4	2	6	2	—	—	—	—	—
NHL totals			410	141	139	280	80	72	23	14	37	18

== See also ==
- List of the longest NHL overtime games
- List of NHL players who spent their entire career with one franchise

== Awards and achievements ==
- Stanley Cup champion: (1936, 1937, and 1943)
- Honoured Member of the Manitoba Hockey Hall of Fame

Preceded by Sid Abel	Detroit Red Wings captain 1943–44	Succeeded by Flash Hollett
