= Flash Hollett =

Canadian ice hockey player (1911-1999)

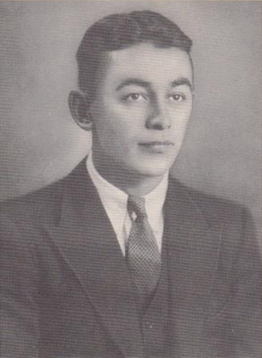
- Hollett in 1939
- Born: April 13, 1911 North Sydney, Nova Scotia, Canada
- Died: April 20, 1999 (aged 88) Mississauga, Ontario, Canada
- Height: 5 ft 11 in (180 cm)
- Weight: 180 lb (82 kg; 12 st 12 lb)
- Position: Defence
- Shot: Left
- Played for: Toronto Maple Leafs; Ottawa Senators; Boston Bruins; Detroit Red Wings
- Playing career: 1932–1946

Frank William "Flash" Hollett (April 13, 1911 – April 20, 1999) was a Canadian professional ice hockey defenceman who played 13 seasons in the National Hockey League for the Toronto Maple Leafs, Ottawa Senators, Boston Bruins and Detroit Red Wings. Hollett was born in North Sydney, Nova Scotia, but grew up in Toronto, Ontario.

== Playing career ==
Hollett was first noticed by Maple Leafs owner Conn Smythe as he was playing lacrosse with Lionel Conacher. He apprenticed in the minor leagues before being loaned to the Senators for the 1933–34 NHL season. After that - which was the original Senators' final season in Ottawa - Hollett played for the Leafs for a season and a half before being sold to the Bruins for $16,000, at the time one of the highest prices ever paid for a player.

Known for his swift skating stride and strong puckhandling ability, Hollett became one of the top offensive defencemen of his day. He played for eight seasons in Boston, and was a star defenceman on the Bruins' Stanley Cup championship teams of 1939 and 1941. In 1942, he set a record for goals by a defenceman with 19, a mark he tied the following season, after which he was named to the league's Second All-Star Team.

Hollett was traded to the Red Wings midseason in 1944, and the following year broke his own mark for goals in a season by a defenceman with 20 en route to a citation on the league's First All-Star Team; this record would stand for a quarter-century before being surpassed by Bobby Orr.

== Retirement ==
After his record-setting season, Hollett's offensive numbers declined sharply in 1946, with the previously war-depleted NHL regaining many former stars. In the wake of an acrimonious contract dispute with Detroit general manager Jack Adams, he was traded to the New York Rangers, but following his wife's wishes to live closer to home in Ontario, Hollett retired from the NHL.

He played for five more seasons in senior leagues, most notably for the Toronto Marlboros, which he led to the Allan Cup in 1950, his last in organized hockey. He coached the Marlboros for a single season in 1951, recording a 19–12–1 record.

Hollett retired having scored 132 goals and 181 assists for 313 points in 565 NHL games; at the time of his retirement, he was the highest scoring defenceman in league history. In 79 NHL playoff games, he added 8 goals and 26 assists for 34 points. Hollett was the last member of the original-era Ottawa Senators still active at the time of his retirement.

In 2023 he would be named one of the top 100 Bruins players of all time.

== Career statistics ==
=== Regular season and playoffs ===
			Regular season					Playoffs
Season	Team	League	GP	G	A	Pts	PIM	GP	G	A	Pts	PIM
1932–33	Syracuse Stars	IHL	19	0	2	2	16	6	3	0	3	9
1933–34	Toronto Maple Leafs	NHL	4	0	0	0	4	—	—	—	—	—
1933–34	Buffalo Bisons	IHL	13	5	4	9	8	—	—	—	—	—
1933–34	Ottawa Senators	NHL	30	7	4	11	21	—	—	—	—	—
1934–35	Toronto Maple Leafs	NHL	48	10	16	26	38	7	0	0	0	6
1935–36	Toronto Maple Leafs	NHL	11	1	4	5	8	—	—	—	—	—
1935–36	Syracuse Stars	IHL	4	2	1	3	8	—	—	—	—	—
1935–36	Boston Bruins	NHL	6	1	2	3	2	—	—	—	—	—
1935–36	Boston Cubs	Can-Am	18	6	15	21	24	—	—	—	—	—
1936–37	Boston Bruins	NHL	48	3	7	10	22	3	0	0	0	2
1937–38	Boston Bruins	NHL	48	4	10	14	54	3	0	1	1	0
1938–39	Boston Bruins	NHL	44	10	17	27	35	12	1	3	4	2
1939–40	Boston Bruins	NHL	44	10	18	28	18	5	1	2	3	2
1940–41	Hershey Bears	AHL	5	4	2	6	2	—	—	—	—	—
1940–41	Boston Bruins	NHL	41	9	15	24	23	11	3	4	7	8
1941–42	Boston Bruins	NHL	48	19	14	33	21	5	0	1	1	2
1942–43	Boston Bruins	NHL	50	19	25	44	19	9	0	9	9	4
1943–44	Boston Bruins	NHL	25	9	7	16	4	—	—	—	—	—
1943–44	Detroit Red Wings	NHL	27	6	12	18	34	5	0	0	0	6
1944–45	Detroit Red Wings	NHL	50	20	21	41	39	14	3	4	7	6
1945–46	Detroit Red Wings	NHL	38	4	9	13	16	5	0	2	2	0
1947–48	Kitchener-Waterloo Dutchmen	OHA-Sr.	15	6	11	17	24	—	—	—	—	—
1948–49	Kitchener-Waterloo Dutchmen	OHA-Sr.	31	6	15	21	20	7	2	3	5	4
1948–49	Kitchener-Waterloo Dutchmen	Al-Cup	—	—	—	—	—	13	3	10	13	11
1949–50	Kitchener-Waterloo Dutchmen	OHA-Sr.	42	7	27	34	29	14	1	8	9	14
1949–50	Kitchener-Waterloo Dutchmen	Al-Cup	—	—	—	—	—	17	5	12	17	8
NHL totals			565	132	181	313	350	80	8	26	34	38

Preceded by Mud Bruneteau	Detroit Red Wings captain 1944–45	Succeeded by Sid Abel
