= Harry Lumley (ice hockey) =

Canadian ice hockey player (1926–1998)

- Hockey Hall of Fame, 1980
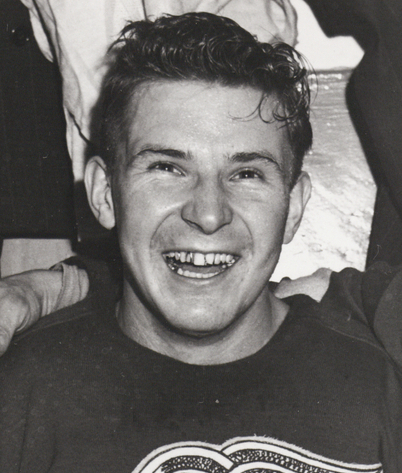
- Lumley with the Detroit Red Wings c. 1947
- Born: November 11, 1926 Owen Sound, Ontario, Canada
- Died: September 13, 1998 (aged 71) London, Ontario, Canada
- Height: 6 ft 0 in (183 cm)
- Weight: 195 lb (88 kg; 13 st 13 lb)
- Position: Goaltender
- Caught: Left
- Played for: Detroit Red Wings; New York Rangers; Chicago Black Hawks; Toronto Maple Leafs; Boston Bruins
- Playing career: 1943–1961

Harry "Apple Cheeks" Lumley (November 11, 1926 – September 13, 1998) was a Canadian professional ice hockey goaltender in the National Hockey League (NHL). He played for the Detroit Red Wings, New York Rangers, Chicago Black Hawks, Toronto Maple Leafs, and Boston Bruins between 1943 and 1960. He won the Vezina Trophy for being the goaltender to allow the fewest goals against in 1954 and won the Stanley Cup with the Red Wings in 1950. He was the second goaltender to win 300 games, doing so in 1958. In 1980, Lumley was elected to the Hockey Hall of Fame.

== Early life ==
Born in Owen Sound, Ontario, Lumley—known as "Apple Cheeks"—grew up playing local minor sports but quickly took to hockey and wound up being a top-notch goaltender. Lumley starred for several years with the Owen Sound Mercurys and later with the Owen Sound Orphans (who were called that because they could not find a sponsor) and then the Barrie Colts. He also played with the Indianapolis Capitals of the American Hockey League, a minor league team of the Detroit Red Wings.

== NHL career ==
Lumley made his professional debut in the National Hockey League with the New York Rangers in the 1943–44 season, when he was loaned to the Rangers for a single game and appeared in 20 minutes of play. With an age of 17 years and 38 days, he became the youngest person to serve as goaltender for an NHL game (with modern NHL rules stating a player must be 18 years of age before September 15 of their draft year, this record cannot be broken). On December 7, 1944, at the age of 18 (and 26 days), he became the youngest goaltender to record their first win, doing so with a 3-2 win on the road versus the Rangers and a month later became the youngest goaltender with a shutout against Toronto.

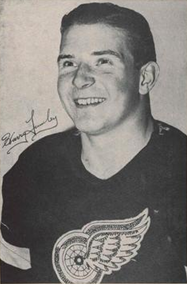
Lumley with the Detroit Red Wings, c. 1940s

In the 1950 playoffs, Lumley led the Red Wings to a Stanley Cup championship, recording three shutouts and a 1.85 GAA in fourteen games. After his performance, however, Jack Adams traded Lumley to the Chicago Black Hawks, with Terry Sawchuk becoming the new goaltender for the Red Wings.

After playing with the Black Hawks for two seasons, he was again traded to the Toronto Maple Leafs. In the 1953–54 season, Lumley won the Vezina Trophy, presented annually to the NHL's best goalie, with a GAA of 1.86. His 13 shutouts that year were a modern National Hockey League record that stood until Chicago's Tony Esposito recorded 15 in 1969–70. Lumley was also named First All-Star Team Goaltender in the 7th National Hockey League All-Star Game.

Lumley was traded back to Chicago in 1956. He refused to play in Chicago and played the following year in the American Hockey League. He played with the Buffalo Bisons and the Providence Reds. Lumley would return to the National Hockey League in 1957 with the Boston Bruins. He played irregularly with them from 1957 to 1960 as he rotated his duties with Don Simmons. He would play one final season with the Winnipeg Warriors in the Western Hockey League.

He retired after the 1959–60 NHL season with 330 wins, 329 losses, 142 ties, and a 2.76 GAA. He was the first goaltender to have won 300 games and lost 300 games. He was elected to the Hockey Hall of Fame in 1980. After retiring, Lumley was a longtime co-owner of the successful Orangeville Raceway. He died on September 13, 1998, of a heart attack.

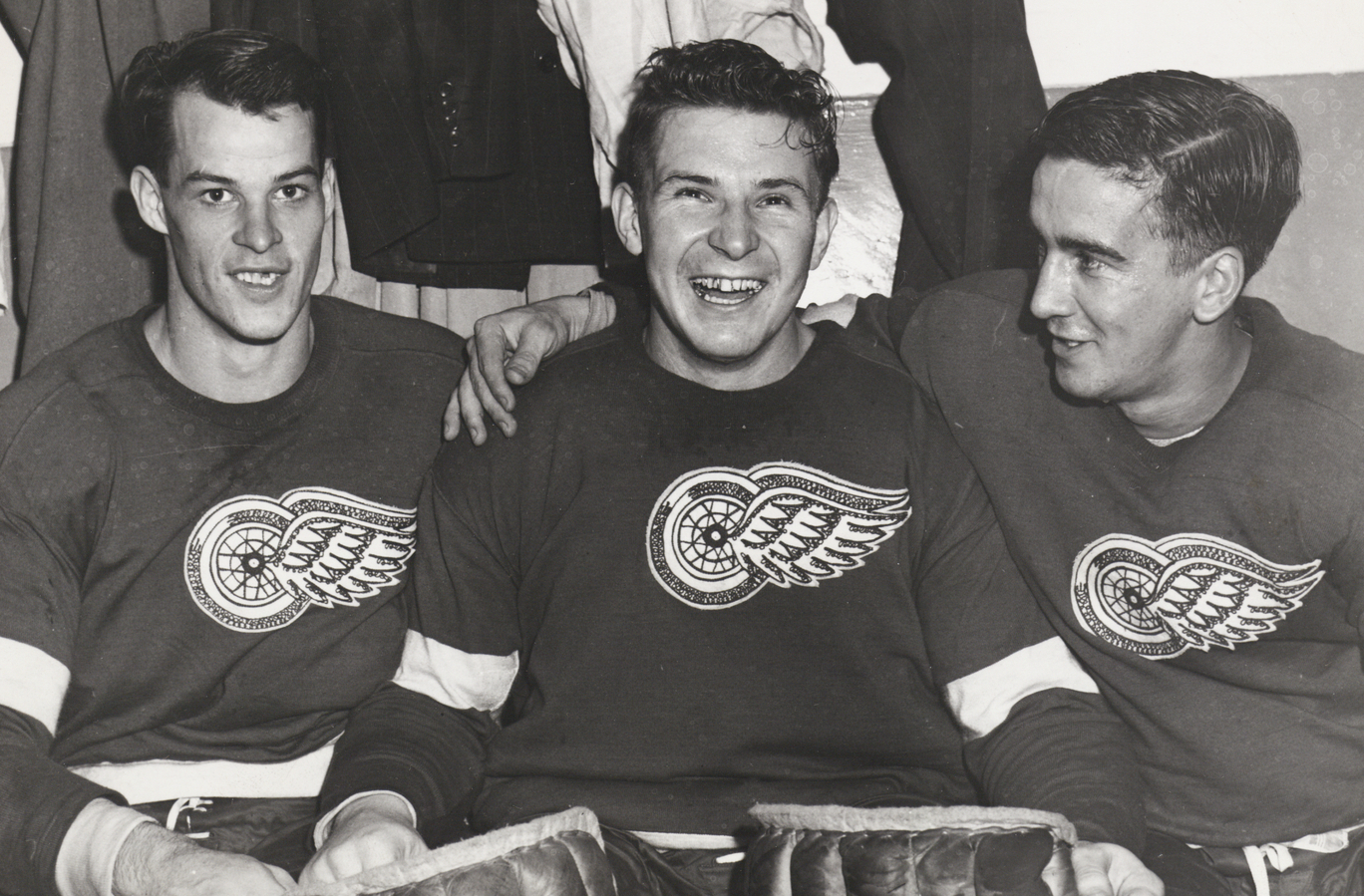
Lumley (center) with fellow future Hockey Hall of Fame Detroit teammates Gordie Howe (left) and Ted Lindsay

Lumley originated the tactic of creating a pocket at shin level in goalie pads, allowing pucks to drop straight onto the ice instead of deflecting off them to an opponent.

== Legacy ==
After retiring, he became a businessman in his hometown of Owen Sound, where he became a part owner of an auto dealership and a standardbred racing stable. He played senior hockey for six years and also coached the Owen Sound seniors for a time. He was inducted into the Hockey Hall of Fame in 1980, much to his apparent surprise: "Sure, it’s something you think about occasionally but when it came, it was a great feeling to know that somebody remembered that you could play a little.” The community centre in his hometown of Owen Sound, where he continued to live after retiring, was renamed in his honour before his death. It is now officially known as the Harry Lumley Bayshore Community Centre. There is a trophy named after him that is awarded to the goalie with the best goals against average in the Ontario Sr.A lacrosse league.

== Awards and achievements ==
- Stanley Cup Championship (1950)
- Played in 1951, 1954, 1955 NHL All-Star Game
- NHL First All-Star Team Goalie (1954 & 1955)
- Vezina Trophy Winner (1954)
- Hockey Hall of Fame 1980

== Career statistics ==
=== Regular season and playoffs ===
			Regular season									Playoffs
Season	Team	League	GP	W	L	T	MIN	GA	SO	GAA	SV%	GP	W	L	MIN	GA	SO	GAA	SV%
1942–43	Barrie Colts	OHA	—	—	—	—	—	—	—	—	—	—	—	—	—	—	—	—	—
1943–44	Detroit Red Wings	NHL	2	0	2	0	120	13	0	6.50	—	—	—	—	—	—	—	—	—
1943–44	Indianapolis Capitals	AHL	52	19	18	15	3120	147	0	2.84	—	5	1	4	300	18	0	3.60	—
1943–44	New York Rangers	NHL	1	0	0	0	20	0	0	0.00	—	—	—	—	—	—	—	—	—
1944–45	Detroit Red Wings	NHL	37	24	10	3	2220	119	1	3.22	—	14	7	7	871	31	2	2.14	—
1944–45	Indianapolis Capitals	AHL	21	11	5	5	1260	46	2	2.14	—	—	—	—	—	—	—	—	—
1945–46	Detroit Red Wings	NHL	50	20	20	10	3000	159	2	3.18	—	5	1	4	310	16	1	3.10	—
1946–47	Detroit Red Wings	NHL	52	22	20	10	3120	159	3	3.06	—	—	—	—	—	—	—	—	—
1947–48	Detroit Red Wings	NHL	60	30	18	12	3592	147	7	2.46	—	10	4	6	600	30	0	3.00	—
1948–49	Detroit Red Wings	NHL	60	34	19	7	3600	145	6	2.42	—	11	4	7	726	26	0	2.15	—
1949–50	Detroit Red Wings	NHL	63	33	16	14	3780	148	7	2.35	—	14	8	6	910	28	3	1.85	—
1950–51	Chicago Black Hawks	NHL	64	12	41	10	3785	246	3	3.90	—	—	—	—	—	—	—	—	—
1951–52	Chicago Black Hawks	NHL	70	17	44	9	4180	241	2	3.46	—	—	—	—	—	—	—	—	—
1952–53	Toronto Maple Leafs	NHL	70	27	30	13	4200	167	10	2.39	—	—	—	—	—	—	—	—	—
1953–54	Toronto Maple Leafs	NHL	69	32	24	13	4140	128	13	1.86	—	5	1	4	321	15	0	2.80	—
1954–55	Toronto Maple Leafs	NHL	69	23	24	22	4140	134	8	1.94	—	4	0	4	240	14	0	3.50	—
1955–56	Toronto Maple Leafs	NHL	59	21	28	10	3527	157	3	2.67	.907	5	1	4	304	13	1	2.57	.926
1956–57	Buffalo Bisons	AHL	63	25	36	2	3780	264	0	4.19	—	—	—	—	—	—	—	—	—
1957–58	Buffalo Bisons	AHL	17	7	9	1	1029	63	1	3.67	—	—	—	—	—	—	—	—	—
1957–58	Boston Bruins	NHL	24	11	10	3	1440	70	3	2.92	.909	1	0	1	60	5	0	5.00	.833
1958–59	Boston Bruins	NHL	11	8	2	1	660	27	1	2.45	.923	7	3	4	436	20	0	2.75	.906
1958–59	Providence Reds	AHL	58	27	29	2	3480	208	4	3.59	—	—	—	—	—	—	—	—	—
1959–60	Boston Bruins	NHL	42	16	21	5	2520	146	2	3.48	.896	—	—	—	—	—	—	—	—
1960–61	Kingston Frontenacs	EPHL	2	1	1	0	120	7	0	3.50	—	—	—	—	—	—	—	—	—
1960–61	Winnipeg Warriors	WHL	61	17	40	4	3660	213	0	2.49	—	—	—	—	—	—	—	—	—
NHL totals			803	330	329	142	48,044	2,206	71	2.76	—	76	29	47	4,778	198	7	2.49	—

== See also ==
- List of NHL goaltenders with 300 wins

Preceded by Terry Sawchuk	Winner of the Vezina Trophy; 1954	Succeeded by Terry Sawchuk
