= 1944–45 NHL transactions =

The following is a list of all team-to-team transactions that have occurred in the National Hockey League (NHL) during the 1944–45 NHL season. It lists which team each player has been traded to and for which player(s) or other consideration(s), if applicable.

== Transactions ==
October 25, 1944	To Montreal Canadiens cash	To Chicago Black Hawks loan of Lude Check
October 30, 1944	To Boston Bruins Bill Jennings	To Detroit Red Wings Pete Leswick
November 24, 1944	To Montreal Canadiens cash	To Detroit Red Wings Felix Rossignol
November 24, 1944	To Toronto Maple Leafs John Mahaffy	To Montreal Canadiens cash
November 27, 1944	To Boston Bruins $12,000 cash	To New York Rangers Guy Labrie
December 24, 1944	To Toronto Maple Leafs Art Jackson	To Boston Bruins $7,500 cash future considerations (Bingo Kampman)^{1}
January 2, 1945	To Detroit Red Wings Earl Seibert future considerations (Fido Purpur)^{2}	To Chicago Black Hawks Don Grosso; Butch McDonald; Cully Simon
February 1, 1945	To Montreal Canadiens Felix Rossignol	To Detroit Red Wings cash

Notes

1. Trade completed on October 29, 1945.
2. Trade completed on January 4, 1945.
