= Lude Check =

Canadian ice hockey player

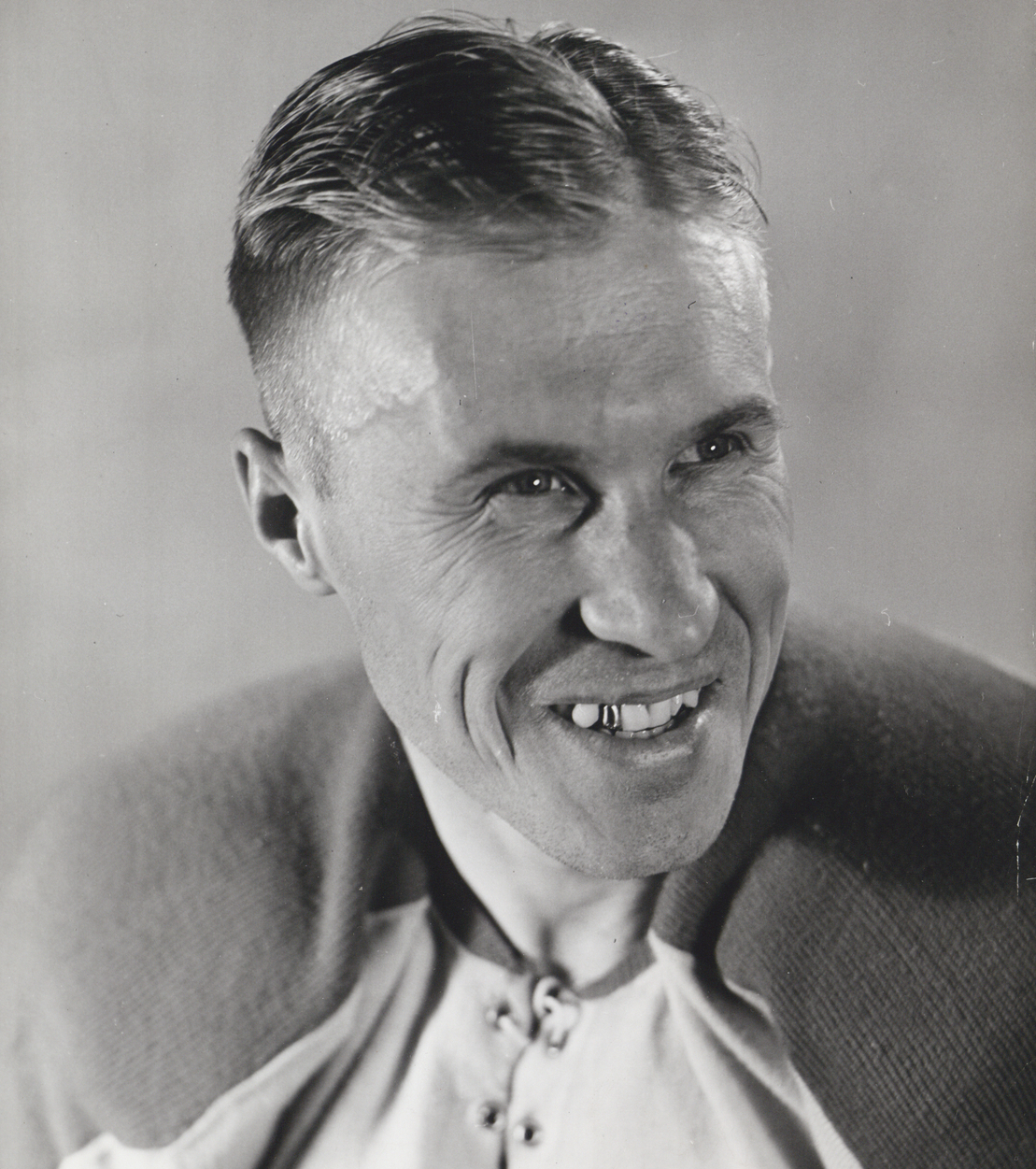
- Born: May 22, 1918 Brandon, Manitoba, Canada
- Died: May 11, 2009 (aged 90) Ottawa, Ontario, Canada
- Height: 5 ft 10 in (178 cm)
- Weight: 165 lb (75 kg; 11 st 11 lb)
- Position: Left wing
- Shot: Left
- Played for: Chicago Black Hawks; Detroit Red Wings
- Playing career: 1938–1951

Ludic Albert Check (May 22, 1918 – May 11, 2009) was a professional hockey player who played for the Detroit Red Wings and the Chicago Black Hawks in the National Hockey League. After several years of hockey in Manitoba, Saskatchewan and New York, Check was signed by the Montreal Canadiens after a season playing with the Quebec Senior Hockey League in 1943. In his first NHL season, he played only one professional game, with the Red Wings in 1944.

Check was then loaned to the Black Hawks, where he played 26 games in his final NHL season. The Canadiens then renewed his contract and sent him to the Ottawa "Senior" Senators of the Quebec Senior Hockey League, where he spent the last six seasons of his career. Check was a part of two Allan Cup-winning teams, in 1944 and 1949, and became a sales representative in later life. He died on May 11, 2009, in Ottawa, Ontario, at the age of 90.

== Early life ==
Check was born in Brandon, Manitoba, on May 22, 1918. Alongside Frank Stahan, Check played two seasons from 1936 through 1938 with the Brandon Wheat Kings of the Manitoba Junior Hockey League. He played two seasons for the Regina Aces (later renamed the Regina Vic-Aces) of the Saskatchewan Senior Hockey League from 1938 through 1940 before deciding to continue his career at the professional level. At the peak of his career, Check stood five feet, ten inches tall and weighed 165 pounds.

== Hockey career ==
After these teams Check, a left winger, spent a season with the New York Rovers of the Eastern Amateur Hockey League. Although the team finished last, he nevertheless was responsible for 21 goals and 20 assists. This was followed by a year with the Sydney Millionaires of the Cape Breton Senior Hockey League, producing 29 goals and 22 assists.

During the 1942–1943 season, Check was signed by the National Hockey League's Montreal Canadiens, although he continued to play for the Quebec Aces of the Quebec Senior Hockey League through 1944, scoring for them a total of 60 goals and 40 assists. His only NHL game during this period was played with the Detroit Red Wings on March 11, 1944, when the Canadiens provided him as an emergency injury replacement, and he did not score any points. Check did, however, win his first Allan Cup while playing with the Aces, defeating the Port Arthur Shipbuilders in 1944. For the 1944-1945 season, he was loaned to the Chicago Black Hawks, playing 26 games and scoring six goals and two assists.

Check spent the rest of his career with the Ottawa "Senior" Senators of the QSHL, after having his contract re-purchased by the Canadiens and being loaned out. He competed in the Allan Cup twice more. In 1948 his team lost to the Edmonton Eskimos, but captured the championship in 1949 after facing off against the Regina Capitals. In six seasons with the Senators, he scored a total of 81 goals and 84 assists, placing him among the top ten league scorers four times. He retired after the 1950–1951 season.

== Later life ==
After his hockey career, Check worked as a sales representative for the Hiram Walker distillery for over 30 years. He kept many friends from his hockey days in his later years, including Leo Gravelle, Emile Dagenais, Billy Robinson, Eddie Emberg and Larry Regan. Check died on May 11, 2009 at the age of 90 in Ottawa, Ontario. At the time of his death, he was one of the last surviving players from Ottawa's last Allan Cup championship team, the Senior Senators of 1949.

== Career statistics ==
=== Regular season and playoffs ===
			Regular season					Playoffs
Season	Team	League	GP	G	A	Pts	PIM	GP	G	A	Pts	PIM
1936–37	Brandon Wheat Kings	MJHL	15	13	6	19	16	4	4	0	4	0
1937–38	Brandon Wheat Kings	MJHL	15	19	13	32	16	5	3	3	6	4
1938–39	Regina Aces	SSHL	39	19	6	25	12	—	—	—	—	—
1939–40	Regina Vic Aces	SSHL	32	15	10	25	12	7	0	1	1	6
1940–41	New York Rovers	EAHL	64	21	20	41	10	3	1	0	1	0
1941–42	Sydney Millionaires	CBSHL	40	29	22	51	24	—	—	—	—	—
1941–42	North Sydney Victorias	CBSHL	—	—	—	—	—	7	5	4	9	12
1942–43	Quebec Morton Aces	QSHL	34	20	13	33	26	4	1	1	2	2
1943–44	Quebec Aces	QSHL	25	28	18	46	14	6	3	1	4	4
1943–44	Detroit Red Wings	NHL	1	0	0	0	0	—	—	—	—	—
1943–44	Quebec Aces	Al-Cup	—	—	—	—	—	9	12	9	21	2
1944–45	Chicago Black Hawks	NHL	26	6	2	8	4	—	—	—	—	—
1945–46	Ottawa Senators	QSHL	39	31	29	60	29	9	6	5	11	6
1946–47	Ottawa Senators	QSHL	40	22	19	41	36	11	5	2	7	4
1947–48	Ottawa Senators	QSHL	46	17	23	40	35	12	8	8	16	13
1947–48	Ottawa Senators	Al-Cup	—	—	—	—	—	14	8	3	11	2
1948–49	Ottawa Senators	QSHL	59	26	30	56	29	11	3	6	9	6
1948–49	Ottawa Senators	Al-Cup	—	—	—	—	—	12	5	4	9	2
1949–50	Ottawa Senators	QSHL	51	14	15	29	8	2	0	0	0	0
1950–51	Ottawa Senators	QSHL	38	11	9	20	16	11	2	4	6	4
QSHL totals			332	169	156	325	193	66	28	27	55	39
NHL totals			27	6	2	8	4	—	—	—	—	—
