= Ted Kennedy (ice hockey) =

Canadian ice hockey player (1925–2009)

- Hockey Hall of Fame, 1966
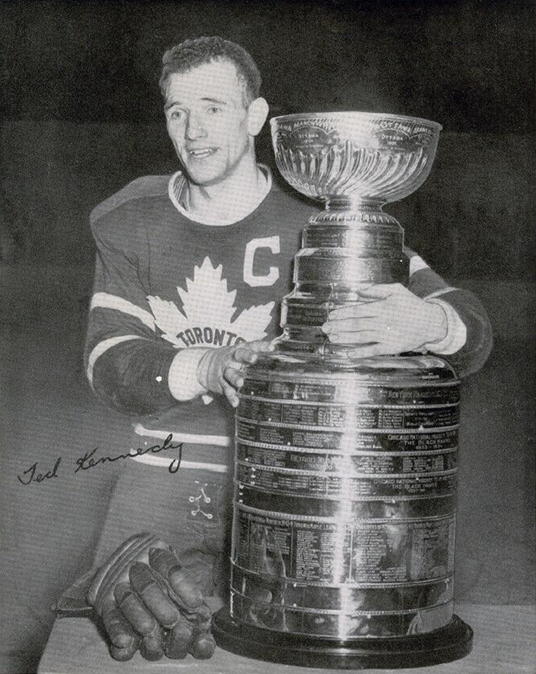
- Kennedy in 1949 with the Stanley Cup
- Born: December 12, 1925 Port Colborne, Ontario, Canada
- Died: August 14, 2009 (aged 83) Port Colborne, Ontario, Canada
- Height: 5 ft 11 in (180 cm)
- Weight: 170 lb (77 kg; 12 st 2 lb)
- Position: Centre
- Shot: Right
- Played for: Toronto Maple Leafs
- Playing career: 1942–1957

Theodore Samuel "Teeder" Kennedy (December 12, 1925 – August 14, 2009) was a Canadian professional ice hockey player. A centre, he spent his entire career with the Toronto Maple Leafs from 1943 to 1957 and was captain for eight seasons. Along with Turk Broda, he was the first player in NHL history to win five Stanley Cups, and he was the last Maple Leaf to win the Hart Trophy for most valuable player, until Auston Matthews in 2022. He was an essential contributor to the Maple Leafs becoming what many consider as the National Hockey League's first dynasty. He was inducted into the Hockey Hall of Fame in 1966. He has been called the quintessential Maple Leaf and by some the greatest player in the team's history. In 2017 Kennedy was named one of the '100 Greatest NHL Players' in history.

Kennedy was raised in the small Ontario town of Humberstone, now Port Colborne. Kennedy was born just eleven days after his father was killed in a hunting accident. His mother, left alone to raise four children, took a job at the local hockey arena which became Kennedy's second home. After a stellar junior hockey career, Kennedy first came to the attention of the Montreal Canadiens and attended their training camp while still in high school. Disappointed and heart sick at the idea of not playing for his favourite team, Montréal who owned his rights eventually traded him to Toronto for defencemen Frank Eddols. A move that contributed to the falling out between Conn Smythe who was away fighting the war with the 48th Highlanders in Europe, and Frank Selke who was left behind to manage the team, resulting in the latter eventually leaving the Leafs organization for the Canadiens.

Although young, Kennedy was successful with Toronto from the start. In his first season, the 18-year-old finished second on the team in scoring and then in his sophomore year was considered the star of Toronto's upset of the record-breaking Montreal Canadiens of 1944–45. He established himself as the leader of the team and became captain in 1948. Although not the best skater in the league, Kennedy was a fierce forechecker and skilled playmaker. Kennedy was a perfect fit into coach Hap Day's emphasis on defence and positional play. He gained a reputation for scoring the important goal and excelling in the playoffs. Kennedy holds the Toronto Maple Leafs' all-time record for career points in the Stanley Cup Final and is the youngest player in the history of the NHL to have scored a Stanley Cup winning goal. A Sports Illustrated poll of hockey experts in 1998 rated Kennedy as having the best face-off skills in the history of the NHL.

== Early life ==
Ted "Teeder" Kennedy was born December 12, 1925, in the small village of Humberstone, Ontario, which in 1970 was amalgamated into the city of Port Colborne. Ted's father, Gordon Kennedy, was killed in a hunting accident eleven days before he was born and his mother, Margaret, was left to raise a family of four children. To supplement her income she took a job selling confectioneries at a local hockey arena which became young Ted's second home. When Ted was seven years old a family friend took him to Toronto to see the first two games of the 1932 Stanley Cup Final and from watching those games Maple Leaf right winger Charlie Conacher became his childhood hero. He wore Conacher's no. 9 throughout his minor hockey career. In Port Colborne, Kennedy was childhood friends with Elmer Iseler, who found fame as a choir conductor and Don Gallinger who became infamous when he was banned for life by the NHL for gambling while playing with the Boston Bruins in 1948.

Kennedy played with the Port Colborne Lions in the Ontario Minor Hockey Association as a bantam, midget and juvenile. His nickname "Teeder" is a short form of his real name which was used by other neighbourhood boys because they could not pronounce "Theodore" and was overheard by a local reporter with the Welland Tribune. During Kennedy's NHL years, newspapers often used the spelling "Teeter". Kennedy was captain of the midget Port Colborne Lions when they won the O.M.H.A. Championship in 1941. The Toronto Star described the 15-year-old Kennedy as a "shifty rightwinger" who had "paced the Lions to victory, scoring five goals, two of which were solo efforts." On May 7, 1941, at a banquet in Port Colborne honouring the championship team, one of the speakers was Hap Day, coach of the Toronto Maple Leafs. He spoke to the players, advising them that "keen desire" and "hard work" was required to get to the top in hockey as in any job in life and that hockey salaries were "equal to other leading professions". Day then presented members of the team with jackets bearing the championship crest. In only two years, Kennedy was playing for Hap Day's Toronto Maple Leafs.

The next season Kennedy's juvenile team made it to the finals. During the season, Kennedy had scored seven goals in one game and six in another and it was efforts such as those which were attracting the attention of professional hockey people. The first team to approach Kennedy was the NHL's Montreal Canadiens, although for Kennedy "It was a boyhood dream to play for Toronto." Dinty Moore, also of Port Colborne, brought Kennedy to the attention Montreal General Manager Tommy Gorman and Kennedy was put on their negotiation list. In the fall of 1942, Montreal contacted the sixteen-year-old about joining the Canadiens. Kennedy's mother was wary of a career in hockey for her son as he was also headed towards studying business at the University of Western Ontario. She agreed to let her son attend the training camp when Montreal scout Dinty Moore assured her Ted was going to receive a good education at Montreal's prestigious Lower Canada College and they were going to cover the cost. Upon arriving in Montreal, foreshadowing future troubles, Kennedy discovered there was no one from the Canadiens to greet him at the train. The teenager was left to his own devices to check into a hotel and make his way around the new city. Then later, as he tried to combine hockey and school, he became concerned his studies were suffering and approached Canadien management to ask if they could find him accommodation closer to the school. He felt they were unresponsive and he soon became disillusioned with the experience in Montreal. After three weeks in Montreal he was feeling homesick and upon completing spring training with the Montreal Royals, he returned to Port Colborne in mid-November.

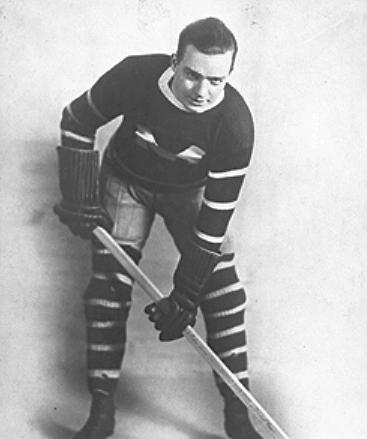
Hall of Famer Nels Stewart was Kennedy's coach and mentor and played a major role early in his career.

Back home, Kennedy played with the Port Colborne Sailors of the OHA Sr. league for the 1942–43 hockey season. The Port Colborne coach was former NHL star and Hall of Fame inductee Nels Stewart who had been hired in November. Stewart became a mentor to Kennedy, working on his playmaking skills. Kennedy credits Stewart with teaching him how to "operate in front of the net". Kennedy finished the season second in the league, only one point behind scoring champion, Dillon Brady of Hamilton. It was during this time that Kennedy debuted as a player at Maple Leaf Gardens. OHA senior teams played at the Gardens on Friday evenings and this included Kennedy and the Port Colborne Sailors. At the end of the season, in early February 1943, in spite of his having abandoned the Royals, Montreal scout Gus Ogilvie was sent to induce Kennedy to sign a contract with the promise that if he signed, he would finish the season with the Canadiens in the NHL. Concerned about his treatment in Montreal, he declined, despite being warned by Ogilvie, "Well, you know, Ted, if you turn pro, it will have to be with the Canadiens." Kennedy now thought his dreams of playing in the NHL were over. However, Nels Stewart believed in Kennedy, considering him "a coming great", and recommended him to the Toronto Maple Leafs. Shortly thereafter, Kennedy was called out of his grade 11 Latin class to the principal's office. Kennedy, the high school student, was at first worried about what he may have done wrong, but it turned out to be a phone call from Nels Stewart. Stewart had arranged a meeting with General Manager of the Leafs Frank Selke and Kennedy had to travel immediately to Toronto. Unlike Montreal, the Maple Leafs had someone there to meet Kennedy when he got off the train. Kennedy signed a contract that evening.

== Playing career ==
=== Style of play ===
Although Kennedy was not a gifted skater, he compensated with a fierce determination and tireless hard work. Among modern era players his style of play has been compared to Bobby Clarke and Jarome Iginla. Line-mate Howie Meeker said that while he was a much better skater than Kennedy, "He went from A to B just as fast I could because he went through people" [sic]. Kennedy was a perfect fit into coach Hap Day's coaching style of emphasizing defense, positional hockey and physical play. He brought to the Leafs a classy, humble leadership and the knack for scoring goals when they were most needed. He fought for every inch of ice and was difficult to separate from the puck. He was also known for his agility, stick-handling, playmaking, passing skills and physical toughness.

Dick Irvin once compared the styles of Syl Apps, previous captain of the Leafs, to Kennedy in how the two centres used their wingers. "Apps used to hit the defence at top speed and Gordie Drillon would come along and pick up the garbage", said Irvin, whereas Kennedy would "go into the corners and get the puck out to their wings." Hap Day had said he could see Nels Stewart's influence on Kennedy. Like Stewart, Kennedy had a more upright lie on his hockey stick which kept the puck closer to his feet. Kennedy was also widely believed to be the best faceoff man in hockey and seldom lost an important faceoff. Along with his regular shift, he also played a role on the penalty kill.

=== Making the team ===
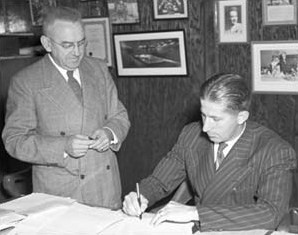
Frank Selke (left), shown here as GM of Montreal, signing Elmer Lach. Earlier, as GM of Toronto Selke had made one of his greatest trades acquiring Kennedy's rights from Montreal. A dispute with President Conn Smythe over the trade caused Selke to leave the Leafs for Montreal, who he later built into a powerhouse.

On March 3, 1943, Kennedy signed a professional contract with the Toronto Maple Leafs, but management of the Leafs still wished to see Kennedy playing in an NHL game. Late in the 1942–43 season, they received permission from Kennedy's mother to take him out of school so he could accompany them on a road trip. He played in two of the final three games of the regular season, but did not continue with them into the playoffs. Making his NHL debut March 7, 1943, against the New York Rangers at Madison Square Garden, he was put on the Leafs' third line on rightwing, instead of his customary centre position, on a line with Bud Poile and Gaye Stewart. He was told by coach Hap Day to simply "stay with your check and keep him from scoring." Kennedy's line scored three goals and he picked up one assist in a 5–5 tie. He then picked another assist in the next game in Boston. Kennedy had impressed the Leaf coaches, but his rights were still "officially" owned by the Montreal Canadiens.

Toronto first tried to buy his rights from Montreal, but a trade was arranged exchanging Kennedy for Frank Eddolls. Toronto newspapers of the day in reporting the trade described the 17-year-old Kennedy as "a rangy youngster whose record in the OHA is exceptionally good", that he was "highly recommended by other hockey men" and was a "high-scoring right-winger". Nevertheless, interim manager Frank Selke had made the trade while Conn Smythe, owner of the Leafs, was away in service in World War II and Eddolls was one of his prized prospects. Smythe was furious when he discovered the trade, creating a rift between the two which ultimately led Selke to leave Toronto to manage the Canadiens. Ironically, Kennedy eventually became Smythe's favourite player and he called Kennedy "the greatest competitor in hockey". Looking back, some hockey pundits have called the trade the best the Toronto Maple Leafs have ever made. In 2001, Sports Illustrated writer and Montreal native, Michael Farber, included the Kennedy trade for Eddolls as one of "the five darkest days" in Montreal Canadiens' history.

Kennedy played full-time with the Leafs for the first time in the 1943–44 season. Although the Leafs had won the Stanley Cup in 1942, at the time of Kennedy's arrival the Leafs were a team decimated by the loss of some of its best players to the war effort. Andy Lytle, sports editor of The Toronto Star, wrote of the Leaf team eliminated from the previous season's playoffs, "I do not suppose that Toronto was so weakly represented in the N.H.L. playoffs since the club originated." During training camp, Kennedy read in a newspaper interview of Coach Hap Day speaking about the best new prospects on the Leafs, but he had failed to mention Kennedy. This served to fire up Kennedy to give an even greater effort towards making the team. Toronto's first pre-season exhibition game was against the St. Catharines Saints, a senior team now being coached by Kennedy's former junior coach Nels Stewart. After the game, Kennedy approached Stewart for advice, because he was disappointed he had not scored in the game. Stewart, who was the all-time NHL goal scoring leader until Maurice Richard overtook him in the 1952–53 season, advised when facing the goaltender to "either draw him out, or pick the corner."

Kennedy began the season playing right wing. Then, in mid-December, Leaf centre Mel Hill fractured his ankle. This gave Kennedy his first opportunity to play regularly at the centre position, where he remained for most of his career. In a January 8 game at Maple Leaf Gardens against the Boston Bruins, the mayor of Port Colborne presented Kennedy and Don Gallinger with gold watches on behalf of his town's citizens. Kennedy finished the season as the team's second best goal-scorer with 26 and was fourth in points. He was just 18 years old. In the playoffs, Toronto faced the powerful Montreal Canadiens. Although Toronto won the first game 3–1, they were then swept in the next four and eliminated from the playoffs. The Toronto Daily Star said of Kennedy's rookie season, "For our money the best rookie of the year though playing with one of the weakest lines in N.H.L. history." Kennedy was ineligible for the rookie-of-the-year award because of the two games he played with the Leafs at the end of the 1942–43 season.

=== The first Stanley Cup and the great upset ===
In only his second NHL season, Kennedy finished the 1944–45 regular season leading the team in goals and points with 29 goals and 25 assists. In the last game of the season against the New York Rangers, Kennedy's line-mates fed him pass after pass attempting to get him to 30 goals. The Maple Leafs finished in third place and faced the Montreal Canadiens in the opening round of the playoffs. The Canadiens of 1944–45 were a record-breaking, powerhouse hockey team. Going into the playoffs, their coach, Dick Irvin, declared them as the greatest team to have ever played in the NHL. The Montreal club had the top three point leaders in the league, placed 5 of the 6 positions on the first All-Star team, Maurice Richard had scored his famous 50 goals in 50 games, Montreal had finished 28 points ahead of Toronto and scored almost a goal-per-game more. As of 2009, Montreal's regular season winning percentage for 1944–45 is the fifth highest in NHL history and the year previously they had achieved the second highest in history and won the Stanley Cup. The Leafs were given little chance of winning the series.

As with all NHL playoff series of the era, the winner was the first team to win four games of a best-of-seven. Going into the series, Hap Day made a critical decision to predominantly play only two lines of his best players to compensate for the Canadiens' depth in talent. The first game was in Montreal and no goals were scored for the first two periods. In the third period, with just twenty-two seconds remaining and everyone anticipating overtime, Ted Kennedy banked a backhand shot off the goalpost which then rebounded off goaltender Bill Durnan's pads and into the net to win the game 1–0. The goal shocked the Montreal team, especially as the famed "Punch Line" had been held scoreless. In the second game, also in Montreal, Kennedy struck again only four minutes into the first period scoring the all-important first goal to put the Toronto ahead by 1–0. Toronto went on to win the game 3–2 and were able to leave Montreal with an unexpected 2–0 series lead. Montreal won the next game in Toronto 4–1. In the fourth game in Toronto, Montreal got off to a quick start and led 2–0 on goals by Elmer Lach and Richard, his first of the series, before the game was three minutes old. In the second period, Kennedy set up Mel Hill to get Toronto back in the game and the Leafs went on to win in overtime. As Toronto needed only one more victory to win the series, Montreal was facing elimination in game five in Montreal. Maurice Richard finally overcame Leaf checking and scored four goals in an 11–3 victory. However, Toronto won the sixth game in Maple Leaf Gardens 3–2 to win the series and complete the shocking upset. In the game, Toronto's Elwyn Morris, a defenceman who had scored only one goal all season, sparked the Leafs when he stole the puck from Montreal defenceman Frank Eddolls to score the first goal of the game. Eddolls was the player traded to Montreal to bring Kennedy to Toronto. This series is considered one of the greatest upsets in NHL history.

On completion of the Montreal series, the Globe and Mail said of the 19-year-old Kennedy, "Ted Kennedy's all-round display was the best individual performance of the six-game set." The Toronto Star was even more laudatory "There are a few great hockey players in the N.H.L. today. Kennedy is assuredly and emphatically one." Kennedy said that the 1945 upset of the Canadiens was the peak event of his career.

Toronto faced Detroit in the Stanley Cup Final. Toronto won the first three games of the series without giving up a goal, as rookie goaltender Frank McCool recorded consecutive shutouts. Toronto then had to ward off a determined Detroit comeback bid, before winning the Stanley Cup in the seventh game. Kennedy had continued with a strong performance against Detroit, scoring the game-winning goal in game two, was chosen the first star (best player) of game three and scored all three goals in a 5–3 loss in game five.

Conn Smythe realized the importance of finding the right line-mates for Kennedy, telling coach Hap Day in September 1945, "we must get something really rapid to team up with this guy and we'll be set for a decade with a first rate front line." Smythe's first attempt was to acquire future Hockey Hall of Famer Edgar Laprade, at the time a star in senior hockey whose rights were owned by the New York Rangers. A deal could not be made as New York General Manager Lester Patrick was asking for several players in return.

After the triumph of the previous season, the 1945–46 season was a complete loss for Kennedy. He got off to a slow start, beginning the season at right wing before being returned to his center position and he also fell ill. By January Kennedy had only 5 points in 21 games and was then lost for the rest of the season due to an injury to his foot, when a Boston Bruin player's skate dug into his boot. With the Leafs also losing Captain Syl Apps to injury Toronto missed the playoffs.

=== The NHL's "first dynasty" ===
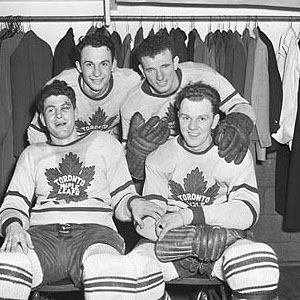
Kennedy (upper right) in 1946

On September 19, 1946, an informal ceremony was held in which former Leaf great Charlie Conacher presented Ted Kennedy with his No. 9 sweater he had worn during his career. Conacher had been Kennedy's boyhood hero, but when Kennedy arrived Lorne Carr already wore No. 9. Kennedy was initially given No. 12, then switched to No. 10. When Kennedy heard Carr was retiring, he immediately wrote a letter to Leaf management requesting No. 9. His Leaf teammates had always teased Kennedy about his compulsion, so they contacted Conacher and arranged for the ceremony. Conacher, now working as a broker, explaining why he was willing to take time off work said "He's a good kid and a great player. You just can't disappoint a guy like that."

Conn Smythe instituted a major rebuilding campaign for the 1946–47. Gone from the team was Sweeney Schriner, Lorne Carr, Bob Davidson, Mel Hill, Elwin Morris, Babe Pratt, Billy Taylor and new additions were Harry Watson, Jimmy Thomson, Gus Mortson, Garth Boesch, Joe Klukay, Don Metz, Vic Lynn and Howie Meeker. The team was very young, with six rookies in the lineup, and was felt to be two years away from challenging for the championship. However, some of those rookies, such as Boesch and Meeker, had just returned from the war and were more mature than most. As Hap Day observed, "They'd been through real battles."

Kennedy said that during this period, with all the changes on the team and with players returning from the war he had to "re-establish myself as an NHLer." Due to Kennedy's poor start to the previous season, there was some talk around this time whether Kennedy was going to turn out to be just a "wartime flash in the pan". Many of the players in the NHL during this period failed to stick with their teams once the war ended and the stars returned. However, Kennedy was one of the exceptions and he quickly became one of the team's greatest stars and a favourite of the fans. "Come on, Teeder!" was to become a familiar rallying cry in Maple Leaf Gardens. The cheer, a howl that could be heard throughout the building, was performed by, the otherwise quiet, season ticket-holder John Arnott whenever the Leafs needed a goal.

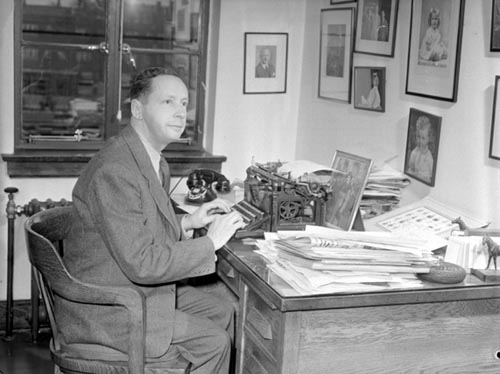
Foster Hewitt's radio broadcasts made Kennedy famous across Canada.

Kennedy became famous across Canada from the radio broadcasts of Foster Hewitt. It was not until the 1952–53 season that hockey games were broadcast on television in Canada.

Kennedy now centered a line between Howie Meeker and Vic Lynn and they clicked "immediately". These were the line-mates Smythe had been trying to find for Kennedy since 1945. Kennedy served as the playmaker between the fast skating and goal scoring of Meeker and Lynn. Meeker had just returned from the war and Lynn had come up from the American league and both were hungry to stay in the NHL. "We were very eager people", Kennedy recalled. The line soon acquired the nickname the "KLM" line.

At the end of the season Kennedy led the Leafs in points and they finished in second place to Montreal. In the first round of the playoffs Toronto faced Detroit. Except for a one-sided 9–1 loss in the second game in Detroit, Toronto dominated the series and won in five games. Toronto now faced Montreal for the Stanley Cup. The match up was between the very young Maple Leafs and the veteran Montreal Canadiens who had dominated the NHL for the past four years. After Toronto lost the opening game by a one-sided 6–0, Canadien goaltender Bill Durnan was quoted in a Montreal newspaper as saying, "How did the Maple Leafs manage to get into the playoffs?" Hap Day used the quote to inspire his team. In the second game, Kennedy opened the scoring at 1:12 of the game then assisted on line-mate Lynn's goal on the next face-off putting the Leafs up 2–0 at less than 2 minutes into the game. Toronto went on to win the game 4–0. In game 3 Toronto had built a 3–0 lead by halfway through the second, but Montreal battled back to close the gap to 3–2. With Montreal pressing in the dying seconds of the game, Kennedy dug the puck out of a desperate scramble in front of the Toronto goalmouth, carried the puck up ice, then forcing goaltender Durnan to go down, he put the puck behind him to clinch the game. Toronto won game 4 in overtime 2–1 while the Canadiens won game 5 in Montreal 3–1. Kennedy's line came up with their best game of the series in game 6. Montreal had taken an early two-goal lead and appeared to be heading for a seventh game in Montreal. In the second period, Lynn tied the game with assists from Kennedy and Meeker. Then in the third with less than six minutes to go in the game Kennedy scored and Toronto held on to win the Stanley Cup.

Kennedy was voted the star in two of Toronto's wins in Montreal, scoring the winning goal in both, and was described as the most determined player in the playoffs. He still holds the NHL all-time record as the youngest player to score a Stanley Cup winning goal. Kennedy finished the playoffs leading the Leafs in points and was second overall. However, despite winning the Stanley Cup the Toronto Maple Leafs did not place a single player on either the first or second All-Star teams.

==== "Strongest team ever" ====
The 1947–48 season brought Max Bentley to Toronto from Chicago in what has been called the biggest trade in NHL history as the Leafs gave up five regular players for the league's scoring leader. Evincing the depth of the team at centre, Bentley played on the team's third line, behind Apps and Kennedy. Decades later, Hap Day argued that this team was the strongest NHL team ever and The Globe and Mail reporter Dick Beddoes also stirred up controversy by saying Wayne Gretzky would have been relegated to the fourth line on this Leaf team.

The Leafs finished in first place at the end of the regular season. Kennedy had finished the regular season third in points on the team behind the other two star centres Apps and Bentley, but it was Kennedy who was to dominate the playoffs. In the first round Toronto played Boston and eliminated the Bruins in five games. Kennedy set up the tying goal which led to an overtime win in game 1 and scored four times in the second game. But it was in the fifth and deciding for which he received greatest praise for his fore-checking tenacity and clutch goalscoring. First, with Toronto down 2–1 and the Bruins having the better of the play, he out-fought two Boston players for possession to get the puck to Bentley who in turn set up Lynn for the tying goal. Then later, Kennedy was carrying the puck into the Boston end. He passed to Meeker, who returned the pass, Kennedy faked once, moved in front of the net, forced goaltender Brimseck to go down, then lifted the puck over him. In the Cup Finals, Toronto swept Montreal in four straight games to win the Stanley Cup. Kennedy scored twice in the Cup-winning game and finished leading all players in the playoffs in points with eight goals and five assists and he was also not given a single penalty in the entire playoffs. His checking and work in the corners has been credited as critical to the victory.

On the afternoon of Thursday, April 16, 1948, the Leaf players were greeted by thousands of Toronto fans as they got off the train from Detroit. They then rode open cars through a cascade of multi-coloured paper and ticket tape through Toronto's business district to arrive at a civic reception at City Hall. Speaking to the huge crowd, Conn Smythe announced that Kennedy was succeeding Syl Apps as captain who was retiring.

In the off-season, on Saturday, June 12, 1948, Kennedy married Doreen Dent of Toronto in Knox College Chapel in Toronto.

The Leafs struggled early in the 1948–49 season having lost Apps and Nick Metz to retirement, and then Kennedy for a month and Cal Gardner for two months due to injuries. By the end of January, Toronto was only one point ahead of the last place New York Rangers who had even played two fewer games than Toronto. Kennedy's return to the team in mid-January provided the needed spark to pull the Leafs out of their prolonged slump. Although finishing the regular season with a losing record of 23 wins 25 losses and 12 ties, they were able to place fourth, which was the last position qualifying for the playoffs. However, in the first round of the playoffs they defeated Boston in five games. Kennedy had scored the game-winning goal which put Toronto up 3–0 in games. Toronto then faced the first-place Detroit Red Wings. During the season, Detroit General Manager Jack Adams said of the Red Wings, "This is the greatest team in my 22 seasons here." However, Toronto swept the Red Wings in four straight games to win their third consecutive Stanley Cup. Kennedy finished the playoffs with two goals and six assists to lead the Leafs in points and was second only to Detroit's Gordie Howe overall.

This was the first time a National Hockey League team had won three Cups in a row and had not been accomplished since the Ottawa Silver Seven in the pre-NHL era, 44 years before. The Leafs had also won nine consecutive Stanley Cup Final games dating back to April 19, 1947 (initial cup won on this date, with the following two wins being finals sweeps). This Toronto Maple Leafs team is distinguished as the first dynasty in the history of the NHL.

==== The Gordie Howe incident ====
At the beginning of the 1949–50, Conn Smythe liked the Leafs' chances for continued success, saying, "We'll be hard to keep away from a fourth Stanley Cup," but as the season progressed many hockey people felt Detroit would end the Leafs' Stanley Cup streak. By the end of the season, Toronto had finished in third and Kennedy finished second on the Leafs in points.

The 1950 playoffs were overshadowed by an on-ice mishap in the opening game between Toronto and Detroit, in which the Red Wings' young star player, Gordie Howe, was seriously injured. Late in the game with Toronto leading 4–0, Kennedy stole the puck from Detroit defenceman Jack Stewart and was carrying it down the left wing about six feet from the boards into the Detroit end of the rink. Stewart was pursuing him from behind and Howe was coming in fast from the side to try to cut him off. Kennedy saw Howe coming at the last moment, and was able to dodge Howe's check while passing the puck to Sid Smith, but Howe could not stop and crashed head-first into the boards, with Stewart falling on top of him. Howe sustained a concussion, facial fractures, and a lacerated right eyeball, and doctors had to perform emergency procedures on him at the hospital to save his life. Detroit coach Tommy Ivan and general manager Jack Adams accused Kennedy of deliberately butt-ending Howe. Kennedy had not been assessed a penalty on the play. After the game Kennedy said, "I don't know how he got it. I avoided his check along the boards and didn't feel anything hit me, although he may have struck my stick."

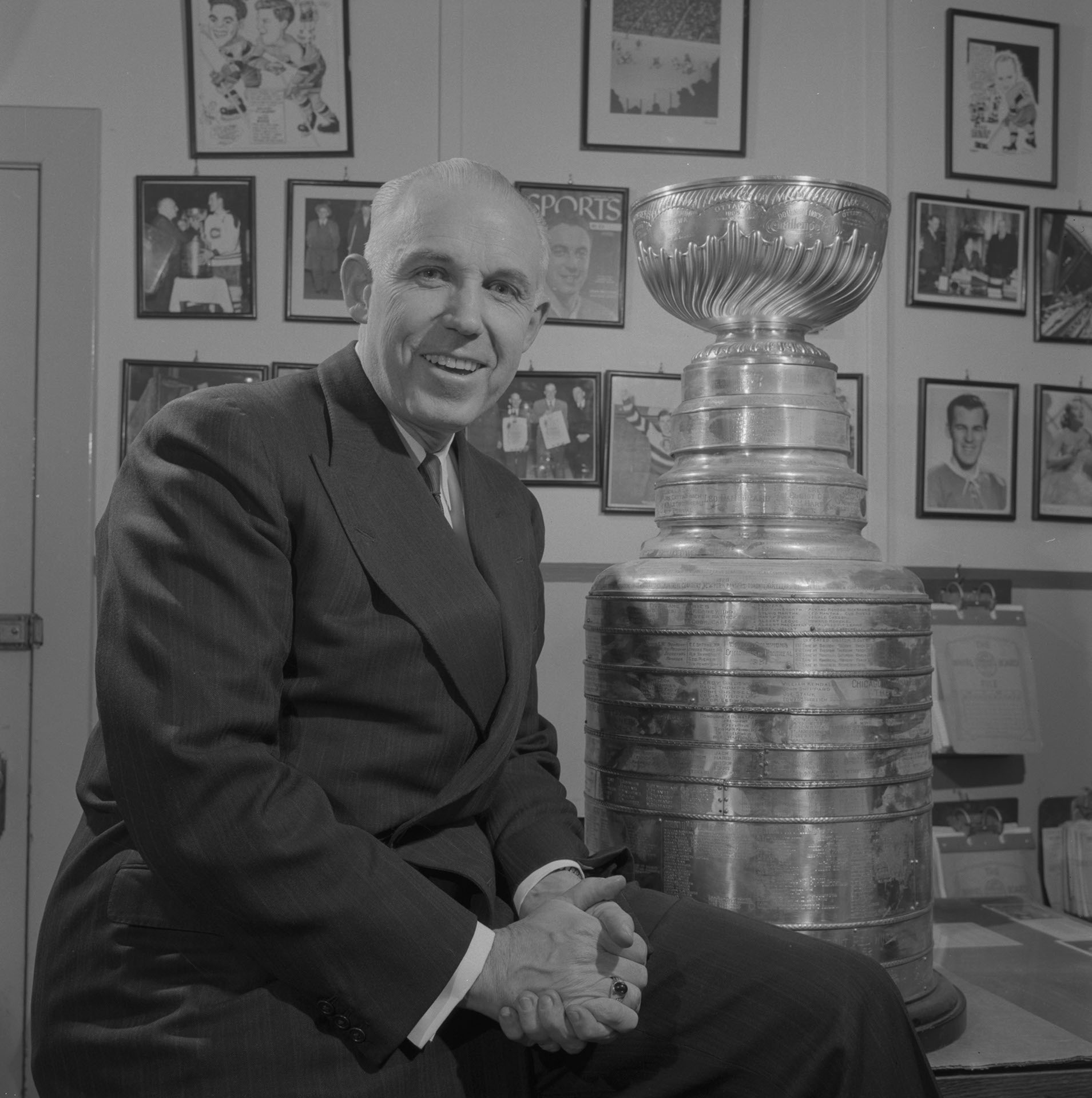
NHL President Clarence Campbell cleared Kennedy of wrongdoing and rebuked Detroit coach Tommy Ivan for accusing Kennedy of a deliberate attempt to injure the Red Wings' Gordie Howe.

NHL President Clarence Campbell was at the game and was seated near where the incident occurred. After receiving a report from the game's officials, Campbell called a news conference and said the injury was not Kennedy's fault. Campbell also publicly rebuked Ivan for his accusation, saying, "That is a pretty serious business and a very vicious charge." It was also argued that since Kennedy was a right-handed shot, the butt-end of his stick was towards the boards and away from Howe. Sportswriter Ted Reeve of the Toronto Telegram quipped, "How would a right-handed stickhandler going down the left boards give anyone a butt end? Unless he wanted to lift the snappers out of someone in the rail seats." Howe was lost from the playoffs, but the incident influenced the momentum of the series. Detroit won the second game of the series 3–1, a violent and fight-filled affair which included a stick-swinging incident between the Leafs' Jimmy Thomson and Detroit's Leo Reise and a fight between Kennedy and Ted Lindsay. After the game, Campbell threatened the players with fines if the violent play continued, and both teams continued to play hockey for the remainder of the series. However, Detroit was now determined to "win the series for Gordie" and defeated the Leafs in seven strongly-contested games to eliminate them from the playoffs, going on to win the Stanley Cup.

In recovery from his hospital bed, Howe said, "Ted is too good a player to deliberately injure another player." Then, years later, while still believing that he had been hit by Kennedy's stick, Howe reiterated that there was no intent to injure on Kennedy's part and considered his injuries self-inflicted. However, the incident still continues at times to be described as a deliberate act by Kennedy. In 2001, The Sporting News ran an article on the 30 toughest players in the NHL. In referring to Howe's injury, the incident was described "he was knocked heavily into the boards by Toronto's Teeder Kennedy".

=== The Final Cup ===
Except for being left with a lifelong facial tick, Howe made a full recovery and for the 1950–51 season as he finished the season leading the league in points. The Maple Leafs finished in second place behind Detroit. Kennedy finished second on the team in points behind Bentley and tied with Howe for the league lead in assists with 43. In the first round of the playoffs Montreal upset Detroit and Toronto defeated Boston.

The Stanley Cup Final between Montreal and Toronto went five games, but is remarkable as each game required overtime to be decided. In the third game, with the series tied at one game a piece, Kennedy both saved the game for the Leafs and won it. First, he prevented a goal by clearing a puck that was heading into the Toronto net, then, just fifty seconds later at the other end of the rink, he intercepted a clear-out pass from Montreal's Calum MacKay and scored to win the game. The fourth game was won by Toronto to lead the series 3–1.

It was in the next game of the series which Leaf defenceman Bill Barilko scored one of the most famous goals in NHL history with a goal in overtime to win the Stanley Cup. However, without Kennedy's face-off skills Barilko's goal would not have occurred. Montreal had been leading late in the game 2–1 and it appeared that the teams were headed to a sixth game in Montreal. With just 39 seconds remaining, Toronto was able to get a faceoff in the Montreal end. Toronto coach Joe Primeau had pulled the goaltender so they could have six skaters. Primeau had the option of changing his players, but decided to leave Kennedy out to take the faceoff against Canadien Billy Reay. Kennedy's plan on the faceoff was to get the puck to Max Bentley, who was stationed at the point. Then Montreal coach Dick Irvin decided to switch and have his best forwards, the Punch Line, out for this critical faceoff. Kennedy faced Lach instead. Kennedy later recalled he was relieved at the switch as he had trouble with Reay on faceoffs, but when Lach came out he felt "I had a chance," Kennedy won the faceoff from Lach, got the puck to Bentley and from the ensuing scramble around the net Tod Sloan tied the game. The goal dispirited the Montreal team and led to Barilko's famed overtime goal which won another Stanley Cup for the Leafs.

Following the 1951 cup, Kennedy said that without the Howe incident of the previous season, "we probably would have been the first team to win 5 in a row."

=== Latter years ===
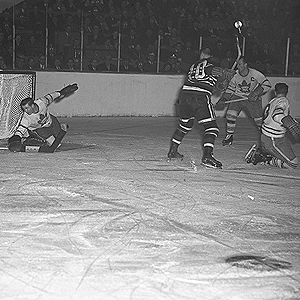
Kennedy the veteran captain, second from right, c. 1954

1950–51 season was Kennedy's last Stanley Cup. In the years following until Kennedy's retirement in 1957 the Leafs either finished out of the playoffs or lost in the first round. However, Kennedy continued to play productive hockey. The Leafs never missed the playoffs in the years Kennedy played a full season.

On October 13, 1951, the Leafs and the Chicago Black Hawks played an afternoon exhibition of hockey, prior to their regularly scheduled evening game, for Princess Elizabeth, the future Queen Elizabeth II, during her visit to Canada. It was captain Teeder Kennedy, representing the players, who greeted the Princess at the game. Kennedy said it was a thrilling moment and recalled thinking at the time, "Here's a kid from the little village of Humberstone, Ontario being presented to the Queen." The 1951–52 season was dominated by Gordie Howe and the Red Wings as they finished the regular season in first and then swept third place Toronto in the first round of the playoffs and Montreal in second round without losing a single game.

In a game in Boston in January of the 1952–53 season Kennedy suffered a separated shoulder in a scuffle with Milt Schmidt of the Bruins and underwent surgery. Originally thought lost for the season, Kennedy trained hard and was able to return to the Leafs in mid-March. However, Toronto still finished out of a playoff position. Despite missing more than two months of the schedule Kennedy still finished second in points on the team. For his efforts Kennedy received the J. P. Bickell Memorial Trophy which is awarded by the Maple Leaf Gardens board of directors as the player most valuable to the Leafs.

For the 1953–54 season, Kennedy finished tied for second on the team in points and was elected to the NHL's 2nd All-Star team. The Leafs finished in 3rd place and were eliminated in the first round of the playoffs by Detroit in five games. At the end of the season, Kennedy announced his intentions to retire. Conn Smythe told reporters he had tendered Kennedy "the highest offer ever made a hockey player". This was a raise above his $25,000 yearly salary (approximately $300,000 in 2025 dollars) according to a contemporary newspaper report. However, Smythe said that Kennedy had told him that lately he felt "he hadn't produced in proportion to what he's been paid." Smythe insisted the Leafs needed Kennedy as Toronto was a young team.

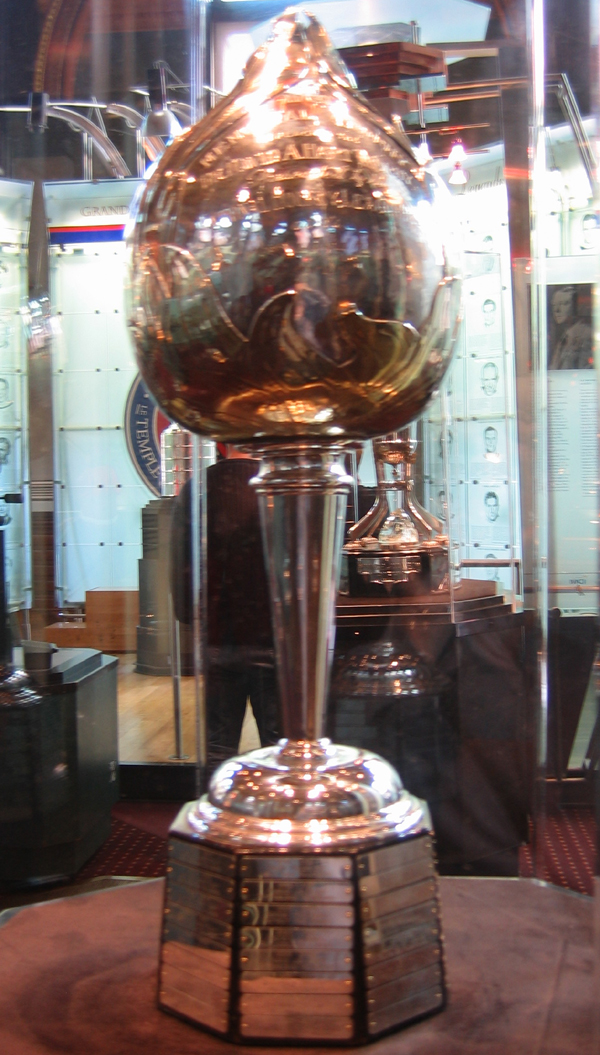
Hart Memorial Trophy for most valuable player. Kennedy would be the last Leaf to win the award for 67 years.

Smythe was able to talk Kennedy into playing the 1954–55 season. At the conclusion of the season, he won the Hart Memorial Trophy, for most valuable player, and would be the last Maple Leaf to win the award until Auston Matthews in 2022. To this point Kennedy had had an impressive career. He had played on five Stanley Cup teams, something no other NHL player had achieved at the time. Toronto had only missed the playoffs twice during his eleven years, one of which Kennedy was injured. By age 22 he had won three Stanley Cups and was the youngest player to have scored 100 goals. Yet, Kennedy had never won an award, nor been elected to a first All-Star team. Although he did finish third in the league in assists, awarding Kennedy the Hart was considered as much as an acknowledgement of his career as his performance in the season. Kennedy along with first ever Hart recipient Frank Nighbor, are the only forwards to have won the award without finishing in the top ten in league scoring. After the Leafs were swept in four straight games in the playoffs by the Detroit Red Wings, Kennedy announced his retirement. For the second time, Kennedy was awarded with the J. P. Bickell Memorial Trophy as most valuable Toronto Maple Leaf.

After missing the entire 1955–56 season, he came out of retirement to play half of the 1956–57 season to help the Leafs who were short on players due to injuries and were struggling to make the playoffs. Kennedy returned November 27 to train himself back into shape after the Leafs had won only one game in their last 11. He scored 22 points in 30 games, but the Leafs finished out of the playoffs. He shared the captaincy with Jim Thomson. A highlight of the season was March 16, 1957, when the Maple Leafs scored 14 goals against the New York Rangers and Kennedy got four assists in what is still the Leafs' all-time record for goals in a single game. When it became clear the team was not going to make the playoffs, he sat out the last two games so the management could have a look at a young Frank Mahovlich. Kennedy said, "It was time for a new generation to lead the team." Mahovlich had practised with Kennedy the previous day and, in expressing regret at never having played in a game with Kennedy said, "Teeder Kennedy's last practice was my first."

During Detroit Red Wing Ted Lindsay's attempts to form a players' union in the 1950s, he was approaching selected leaders among the other five NHL teams. Although Kennedy was the lone holdout, which greatly disappointed Lindsay, he still respected Kennedy for not informing Conn Smythe about being approached. "I won't squeal", Kennedy told him. According to Glenn Hall, Conn Smythe "ostracized" his captain when he discovered Kennedy had not told him about Lindsay's endeavours. There was speculation that this led to Kennedy failing to land a job with the Leafs after retirement.

== Retirement ==
Kennedy continued for a short time after retirement as a salesman with Canadian Building Materials, with whom he had worked for during his hockey career in the off-season, but soon left the company. In 1957–58, he was the second coach of the Peterborough Petes OHA "Junior A" team before being succeeded by Scotty Bowman. After a successful season coaching Peterborough, Kennedy reportedly turned down an offer to coach the Toronto Maple Leafs prior to their signing of Punch Imlach.

He returned to Port Colborne to raise thoroughbred horses, which was an occupation he had been involved during his hockey career. Kennedy owned the Faraway Hills Farm and the St. Marys Thoroughbred Training Centre in Ontario which included a quarter-mile indoor track. His horse, On Board, won the grand championship for stallions three times at the Canadian National Exhibition and at the Royal Winter Fair.

In 1966 Ted Kennedy was inducted into the Hockey Hall of Fame. In 1975, an arena in Port Colborne, the Teeder Kennedy Youth Arena, was named in his honour.

Kennedy was a steward with the Ontario Racing Commission from 1977 to 1985. In June 1979, Kennedy was one of three stewards who scratched Come Lucky Chance from the $100,000 Canadian Oaks after the horse had thrown its rider prior to the race. Infuriated by the ruling was the horse's owner, 84-year-old Conn Smythe. Although, Smythe was quoted as saying, "I'll raise hell with only two of the stewards." In July 1984, Kennedy was one of the stewards for the Queen's Plate, who ruled against an appeal by Larry Attard riding Let's Go Blue that he was interfered with by the winning horse Key To The Moon. Kennedy was then head of security at Fort Erie Racetrack.

In 1987, Kennedy appeared along with Leaf defenceman of the 1970s, Jim McKenny, in an educational video for the Ontario Government on the dangers to athletes of drug and alcohol abuse. Kennedy, an abstainer, said he was always considered "one of the boys" on the team even through he did not drink. Kennedy's stellar career contrasted with McKenny, considered along with Bobby Orr as the best prospects in junior, had his career negatively impacted by alcoholism.

During his retirement, Kennedy also participated in Old-Timers hockey for charity benefits. He was also an avid golfer, scoring a 215-yard hole in one in 1981 at Scarboro Golf and Country Club.

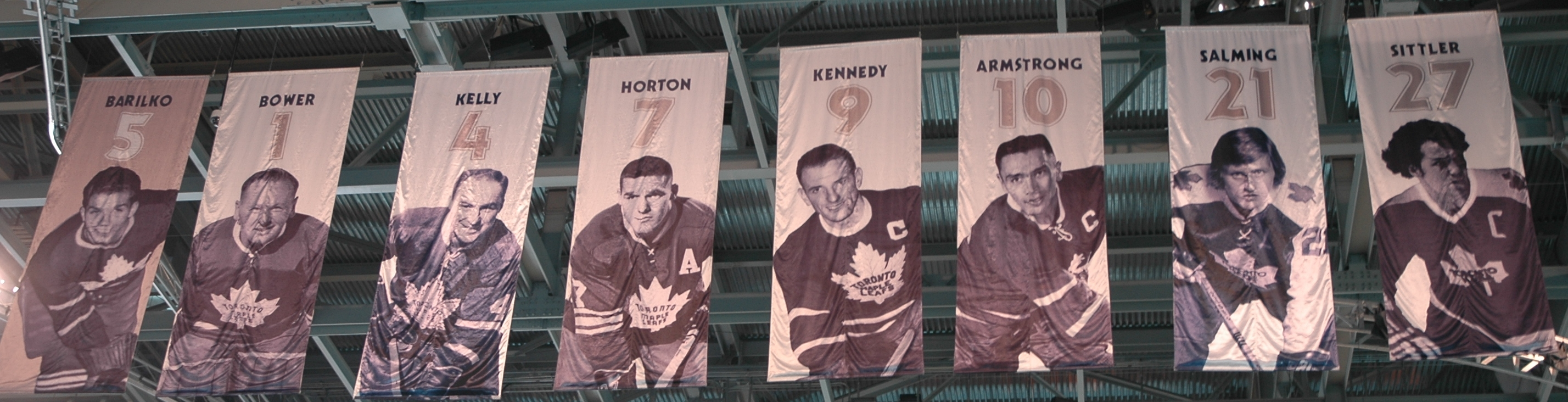
Banners honouring Leafs of the past including Ted Kennedy, #9 fourth from the right, hanging at the Scotiabank Arena in Toronto

On October 3, 1993, Kennedy, along with Syl Apps, were honoured in a pre-game ceremony by having banners raised at Maple Leaf Gardens.

In 1995, it was reported Kennedy had again returned to live in the hometown of his youth Port Colborne. In 1999, Kennedy underwent hip replacement surgery.

Ted Kennedy was inducted into the Ontario Sports Hall of Fame in 1999.

Ted Kennedy died on August 14, 2009, in a Port Colborne nursing home, at the age of 83, of congestive heart failure. He is survived by his wife Doreen, son Mark, two grandchildren and two great-grandchildren.

Following the announcement of Kennedy's passing, many fans and papers published tributes, while former NHL players paid their respects. Jean Béliveau, a former member of the rival Montreal Canadiens, expressed sadness upon the news, stating "I was certainly happy to play against him, and I'm so sorry to hear (of his death)". He added, "He was a complete centreman, a good playmaker, a good passer, good on faceoffs." Brian Burke, the Leafs' general manager at the time of Kennedy's passing, issued a statement, reading "He truly was a man of great class and he was one of the most accomplished leaders in our team's long history." NHL commissioner Gary Bettman also issued a statement mourning Kennedy's loss.

The National Hockey League family mourns the passing and cherishes the memory of Teeder Kennedy, the embodiment of Maple Leaf success. Teeder never wanted to play for any other team, and he never did. He always wanted what was best for the Leafs, and for 14 superb seasons, that is what he helped them achieve through his leadership, his incomparable work ethic and his ferocious will to win.

— Gary Bettman on Kennedy's passing,

== Legacy ==
=== Quintessential Leaf ===
Ted Kennedy never played for another team, never wanted to, and captained the Toronto Maple Leafs during its greatest era. He has been called the quintessential Maple Leaf. However, Kennedy was never voted to the first All-Star team. Frank Selke explained Kennedy "never made the first All-Star team because he lacked one thing – colour. He's been unlucky that way." On another occasion Selke had said, "Many times men were named who were not his equal in all-round effectiveness." Despite Kennedy's sparse acquisition of individual awards, many sportswriters consider Kennedy as possibly the greatest player to have played for the Toronto Maple Leafs. In the book The Maple Leafs Top 100 Kennedy is ranked second only to Dave Keon as the best Toronto Maple Leaf of all time. While The Hockey News ranked Kennedy at only #57 on their list of the 100 Greatest Hockey Players, in 2009 The Edmonton Journal published a list of top 50 NHL players of All-Time and Ted Kennedy finished at #10, ahead of all other Maple Leafs and such players as Howie Morenz and Patrick Roy. The list, with the intention of minimizing subjectivity, was compiled using voting for the Hart and Smythe trophies for most valuable player during the regular season and playoffs respectively. When the list was adjusted to account for the fact that goalies and defensemen are traditionally overlooked for the Hart, Kennedy's ranking even improved to #8.

=== Playoff performer ===
Kennedy had the reputation for excelling in the playoffs. He was the first player in NHL history to win five Stanley Cups and by just age 22 he had already won three Stanley Cups. Kennedy holds the Toronto Maple Leafs' all-time record for career points in Stanley Cup Final with 23. He is the youngest player in the history of the NHL to have scored a Stanley Cup winning goal when he scored the winning goal of game 6 in 1947 at 21.4 years of age. Until the Pittsburgh Penguins won the Stanley Cup in 2009, with 22-year-old Sidney Crosby as captain, Kennedy shared the honours with Wayne Gretzky as the youngest captains to have won the Cup. In 2001 The Hockey News assembled a panel of five hockey experts to choose the winners of a "would-be" Conn Smythe Trophy, for best playoff performance, had the trophy been awarded prior to the 1964–65 season. Using microfilms of newspapers of the day and studying statistics and quotes from writers and coaches they chose winners from 1917–18 to 1963–64. Only Kennedy was chosen as many as three times for his playoff performances in 1945, 1947 and 1948. He is fourth all-time in playoff goals and sixth all-time in points for the Maple Leafs

=== Face-off skills ===
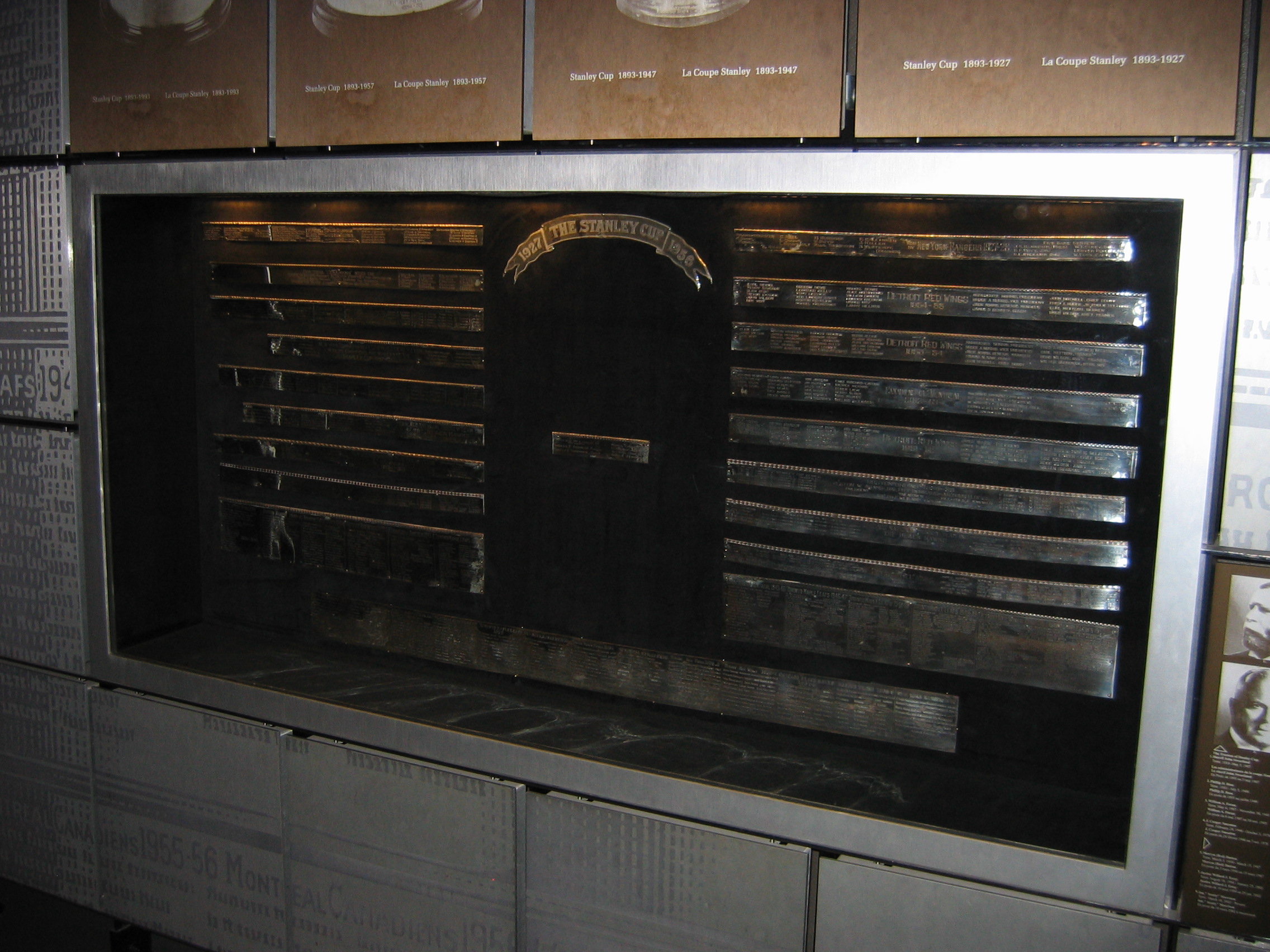
Bands removed from the Stanley Cup are displayed at the Hockey Hall of Fame.

His face-off skills were highly regarded and it was considered invaluable. The April 27, 1998, issue of Sport Illustrated published "The Best Ever on the Draw", a poll of NHL experts of the top ten players of all time for skills on the faceoff, and Kennedy was ranked at #1. Lloyd Percival once called Kennedy the "Billy the Kid" of hockey. Derek Sanderson, considered the best at faceoffs in the late 60s and 70s, related how his father had him watch Kennedy on the TV to learn the skill. In a 1987 interview Kennedy told a reporter, "I went all-out at face-offs. Your centre is your quarterback and our other guys knew exactly what I was trying to do." In the 1970s, GM of the Leafs, Jim Gregory asked Kennedy if he would help the team to improve their face-off performance. Kennedy agreed but with one stipulation. "This can't involve (just) the centermen. It has to involve all five guys," Kennedy told Gregory and coach Roger Neilson. "Everyone has to be in tune. Everybody has a job to do. This is a team."

== Career statistics ==
=== Regular season and playoffs ===
			Regular season					Playoffs
Season	Team	League	GP	G	A	Pts	PIM	GP	G	A	Pts	PIM
1942–43	Port Colborne Sailors	OHA Sr.	23	23	29	52	15	—	—	—	—	—
1942–43	Toronto Maple Leafs	NHL	2	0	1	1	0	—	—	—	—	—
1943–44	Toronto Maple Leafs	NHL	49	26	23	49	2	5	1	1	2	4
1944–45	Toronto Maple Leafs	NHL	49	29	25	54	14	13	7	2	9	2
1945–46	Toronto Maple Leafs	NHL	21	3	2	5	4	—	—	—	—	—
1946–47	Toronto Maple Leafs	NHL	60	28	32	60	27	11	4	5	9	4
1947–48	Toronto Maple Leafs	NHL	60	25	21	46	32	9	8	6	14	0
1948–49	Toronto Maple Leafs	NHL	59	18	21	39	25	9	2	6	8	2
1949–50	Toronto Maple Leafs	NHL	53	20	24	44	34	7	1	2	3	8
1950–51	Toronto Maple Leafs	NHL	63	18	43	61	32	11	4	5	9	6
1951–52	Toronto Maple Leafs	NHL	70	19	33	52	33	4	0	0	0	4
1952–53	Toronto Maple Leafs	NHL	43	14	23	37	42	—	—	—	—	—
1953–54	Toronto Maple Leafs	NHL	67	15	23	38	78	5	1	1	2	2
1954–55	Toronto Maple Leafs	NHL	70	10	42	52	74	4	1	3	4	0
1956–57	Toronto Maple Leafs	NHL	30	6	16	22	35	—	—	—	—	—
NHL totals			696	231	329	560	432	78	29	31	60	32

Sources: Total Hockey hockey-reference.com

== Notes ==
Preceded by Al Rollins	Winner of the Hart Trophy; 1955	Succeeded by Jean Béliveau
Preceded by Syl Apps	Toronto Maple Leafs captain 1948–55	Succeeded by Sid Smith
Preceded by Jimmy Thomson	Toronto Maple Leafs captain 1957	Succeeded by George Armstrong
