= Bill Cowley =

Canadian ice hockey player (1912–1993)

- Hockey Hall of Fame, 1968
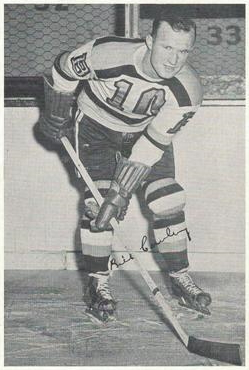
- Born: June 12, 1912 Bristol, Quebec, Canada
- Died: December 31, 1993 (aged 81) Ottawa, Ontario, Canada
- Height: 5 ft 10 in (178 cm)
- Weight: 165 lb (75 kg; 11 st 11 lb)
- Position: Center
- Shot: Left
- Played for: St. Louis Eagles; Boston Bruins
- Playing career: 1934–1947

William Mailes "Cowboy" Cowley (June 12, 1912 – December 31, 1993) was a Canadian professional ice hockey center who played 13 seasons in the National Hockey League for the St. Louis Eagles and Boston Bruins. Described as the Wayne Gretzky of his era, Cowley twice won the Hart Memorial Trophy as the NHL's MVP, and is widely regarded as one of the best playmakers in hockey history.

== Amateur career ==
Born in Quebec and raised in the Ottawa Valley, Cowley played junior ice hockey locally, for the Ottawa Primrose and Ottawa Shamrocks of the Ottawa City Hockey League. He led the competition in scoring while playing for the Primroses in the 1931 Memorial Cup, where they lost in the finals by the Elmwood Millionaires, two games to one.

He was selected by Cecil Duncan to be on an Ottawa All-Stars team which went undefeated on an exhibition series in Europe during December 1931 and January 1932. Following the tour, he played a partial season for the Shamrocks' senior team in 1933, before moving on to play for the Halifax Wolverines of the Maritime Senior Hockey League in 1934, leading the league that season in goals, assists and points.

== NHL career ==
=== 1930s ===
After playing a single minor professional game for the Tulsa Oilers of the American Hockey Association at the start of the 1934–35 season—scoring no points but getting into a fight—Cowley broke in as a rookie with the St. Louis Eagles, formerly the Ottawa Senators. After the season, the Senators/Eagles franchise was terminated and Bruins general manager Art Ross selected Cowley with the sixth selection in the subsequent dispersal draft, paying a dispersal fee of $2,250 to the Senators.

Originally playing for Boston as a left winger instead of at his natural center position due to the presence on the Boston roster of star centers Cooney Weiland and Dit Clapper, Cowley scored his first goal for Boston on December 1, 1935, in the Bruins' 2–0 victory over the New York Rangers at Boston Garden. He finished the 1936 season with 21 points, good for fourth in team scoring that year. By the playoffs, he had improved enough to be a starter, centering a checking line with Paul Runge and Peggy O'Neil, and contributed two goals in the Bruins' two-game total-goals loss to the Toronto Maple Leafs.

In his second season, he moved permanently to center on a line with Ray Getliffe and Charlie Sands, Cowley broke through to stardom, leading the Bruins in scoring and tying for eighth in the league that season. While the injury-riddled Bruins failed in the playoffs again—losing in three games to the Montreal Maroons—Cowley was rewarded by a fourth place finish in voting for the Lady Byng Memorial Trophy.

Augmented by the first full season of the famous Kraut Line, comprising Milt Schmidt, Bobby Bauer and Woody Dumart, the 1938 season saw the Cowley-led Bruins rocketing to the top of the standings, recording 30 wins, a mark only surpassed in league history to that date by the 1930 Bruins. Again Cowley led Boston in scoring with 38 points, good for fifth in the league, and he was named a First Team All-Star at center for the first time.

As the 1939 season got underway, Cowley was assigned new linemates, Roy Conacher and Mel Hill. Even though Cowley missed over a quarter of the season with a knee injury, he finished third in league scoring behind Toe Blake and Sweeney Schriner, and set a new single-season NHL record for assists with 34 (a record Cowley would break himself in 1941). The opening playoff series against the Rangers was the first in league history to go a full seven games, and famously won by Hill, who with his three overtime goals earned the nickname "Sudden Death"; Cowley assisted on all three of his goals and scored three himself. The Bruins went on to defeat Toronto in the finals for their second Stanley Cup; Cowley led all playoff scorers with 14 points.

=== 1940s ===
Boston defended its regular season title in 1940 season, with Cowley finishing tied for fourth in league scoring behind all three members of the Kraut Line (the only other times the top four scorers came from the same team would be from the Bruins as well, in 1971 and 1974).

The 1941 season saw Cowley have his best season to date, leading Boston to its unprecedented fourth straight regular season championship. Even though his chronically bad knee forced him out of some games and almost all of the playoffs, Cowley won the scoring championship by a wide margin over Bryan Hextall of the Rangers with 62 points—second in league history only to Cy Denneny's mark of 73 in 1930, when the forward passing rules had been vastly liberalized—and won the Hart Memorial Trophy. He also broke his own record for assists in a season with 47, and was named a First Team All-Star for the second time. Despite Cowley only being able to play in two playoff games and scoring no points, the Bruins won their third Stanley Cup title, defeating the Detroit Red Wings in four consecutive games in the final round.

World War II ravaged the Bruins' powerful roster starting the next season. While the Bruins were comfortably in first place through the season's halfway point, all three of the Kraut Line were called up to the Canadian armed forces shortly thereafter. Worse yet, Cowley suffered a serious jaw injury against Detroit on January 22—Busher Jackson quoted as saying the injury was one of the worst he had ever seen—and missed all of the rest of the regular season, with team manager Art Ross deliberately holding him out for the playoffs. During the season, on February 5, 1942, one of the first NHL All-Star Games was organized in Boston, between a Boston team augmented by recently retired Bruins and an alumni All-Star team from other clubs, to benefit the U.S. Army Relief Society. Too injured to play, Cowley coached the Bruins team; the game ended in a 4–4 tie.

In the 1943 season, Cowley regained full form, playing in every game and once again leading the league in assists, as well as in power play and game-winning goals. He scored new career highs of 27 goals and 72 points, finishing second in the scoring race to Doug Bentley of the Chicago Black Hawks, while being cited by Detroit manager Jack Adams as being the greatest stickhandler the game had ever seen. He was named First Team All-Star for the third time, and given the war- and injury-riddled Bruins' roster, was awarded his second Hart Memorial Trophy as the league's most valuable player.

Now in his thirties and suffering more frequent injuries, Cowley never again played a full season. Yet 1944 proved his finest season, as he comfortably led the league in scoring for most of it, tallying nearly two points a game, a mark that would stand for decades (though this would be the only season during Cowley's career in which the Bruins missed the playoffs). He centered a line with Herb Cain and Art Jackson. With the team once again decimated with injuries and enlistments, Cowley was the sole major star left. The injury bug struck again on January 7, when in the midst of a 12–3 rout by Toronto, Leaf center Jack McLean separated Cowley's shoulder with a heavy boardcheck; Bruins manager Ross alleged that it was a dirty play and the result of a deliberate attack. Upon returning to the lineup, he reinjured his chronically bad knee and was forced out again, eventually missing 14 games in all to finish seventh in league scoring. Despite missing so much action, he was named First Team All-Star at center for the fourth and final time, and was runner-up in Hart Trophy voting to Babe Pratt of Toronto.

He was healthy for most of the 1944–45 NHL season, and led the scoring race for most of it (despite little help from the ongoing decimation of the Bruins roster) before tailing off to finish fourth in league scoring (behind Elmer Lach, Maurice Richard, and Toe Blake, who played on the Montreal Canadiens' Punch Line), and leading the Bruins in scoring for the final time. Cowley was named to the Second All-Star Team, and placed third and fourth respectively in the Hart and Lady Byng voting. He was considered the star of the series as the threadbare underdog Bruins extended the recent Stanley Cup champion Detroit Red Wings to seven games in the opening series of the playoffs.

Centering Cain and Don Gallinger as the 1945–46 NHL season dawned, and with the return of many players from the military, Cowley started out strong, scoring 24 points in 26 games before suffering a compound fracture of the wrist in a January match against the Canadiens. He returned in time for the playoffs, where the Bruins fell to the Canadiens in the Cup Finals.

In his final season, Cowley was slowed by age and the progressive effect of his many injuries, but finished fourth in team scoring behind Schmidt, Bauer and Dumart despite missing nine games, and centered a line with Gallinger and Bep Guidolin. On February 12, 1947, he surpassed Syd Howe to become the all-time career NHL points leader in a 10–1 win over the New York Rangers.

== Retirement ==
On April 5, 1947, at the Bruins' annual breakup party, Cowley unexpectedly announced he was leaving hockey because general manager Art Ross had chosen to leave him off of the roster for a post-season exhibition tour of western Canada and the United States. Cowley's wife was from Vancouver and he wanted to use the trip as a honeymoon.

After his career, Cowley went on to coach the Ottawa Commandos team in the Ontario Hockey Association's senior loop in 1948, and the Vancouver Canucks of the Pacific Coast Hockey League in 1949, in which the team finished third place in its division with a 33–31–6 record, before leaving the sport for good.

Returning to Ottawa after his coaching days, Cowley went into business, owning a hotel in Smiths Falls, Ontario and the Elmdale Tavern/Hotel in Ottawa. In 1967, he was a founder of the Ottawa 67's junior ice hockey team, and remained part owner until 1975. He passed on the Elmdale to his son John.

Cowley died on New Year's Eve, 1993, of a heart attack. He was survived by his wife Jessie (née Wilson), children Jill Fumerton, John, Jane Egan and Dan. He is buried in the hamlet of Norway Bay, Quebec, just south-east of his birthplace of Bristol, where he had a home and spent much of his retirement years.

== Legacy ==
Cowley finished his career with 195 goals and 354 assists for 549 points in 549 NHL games. Upon his retirement, Cowley was the NHL career leader in assists (a distinction he had held from the 1944 season on forward) and points; he held both marks until he was surpassed by Elmer Lach in 1952. He led the league in hat tricks twice (1943 and 1944), in assists per game five times, and in points per game four times. His 1.29 points per game in the "Original Six" era is the most for all players to have played at least 100 games.

His 1944 record of 1.97 points per game stood as the all-time mark until Wayne Gretzky surpassed it in 1981. Cowley later said of Gretzky surpassing his mark, "I never thought I'd see the day when a player would do that. I always thought that would be impossible."

Throughout his career, Cowley had a reputation as one of the greatest passers of his generation. Across 13 NHL seasons, he finished as the league’s assist leader three times, showcasing his remarkable vision and awareness on the ice. He was known for creating chances for teammates rather than take the shot himself. His disciplined style also meant he spent little time in the penalty box,. Many considered him the premier playmaking center of his era. He is remembered as unselfish, intelligent, and consistently effective. Cowley preceded the modern playmaking centers and his style foreshadowed modern greats. This led to him being dubbed the Wayne Gretzky of his era.

Jack Adams remarked that Cowley was the greatest stick handler he had ever seen.

Cowley was the last active player who had played for the Senators/Eagles franchise. He was inducted into the Hockey Hall of Fame in 1968, as the sole inductee into the Players category that year. In 1998, he was ranked number 53 on The Hockey News' list of the 100 Greatest Hockey Players.

He is regarded as one of the best players in Bruins history. He was honored during the team's centennial celebrations in 2024 as one of the top 100 Bruins players of all time and was named to the Bruins All-Centennial Team.

== Awards and Achievements ==
- Stanley Cup Champion (1939, 1941)
- Hart Memorial Trophy Winner (1941, 1943)
- NHL First Team All Star (1938, 1941, 1943, 1944, 1945, 1946)
- NHL Scoring Champion (1941)
- Elizabeth C. Dufresne Trophy (1944)
- NHL Second Team All Star (1947)
- Led the NHL in assists in (1940, 1941, 1943)
- Inducted into the Ottawa Sports Hall of Fame in 1967
- Inducted into the Hockey Hall of Fame in 1968
- Ranked number 53 on The Hockey News' list of the 100 Greatest Hockey Players in 1998
- Named one of the top 100 best Bruins players of all time
- Named to the Bruins All-Centennial Team

== Career statistics ==
- **Bold** indicates led league

			Regular season					Playoffs
Season	Team	League	GP	G	A	Pts	PIM	GP	G	A	Pts	PIM
1929–30	Glebe Collegiate Institute	HS-ON
1930–31	Ottawa Primrose	OJCHL	14	10	2	12	16	4	4	1	5	8
1930–31	Ottawa Primrose	MC	—	—	—	—	—	9	9	3	12	4
1931–32	Ottawa Jr. Shamrocks	OCJHL	2	2	1	3	2	3	4	4	8	2
1931–32	Ottawa Shamrocks	OCHL	—	—	—	—	—	1	0	0	0	0
1932–33	Ottawa Shamrocks	OCHL	14	7	6	13	24	4	1	0	1	4
1933–34	Halifax Wolverines	MSHL	38	25	25	50	42	6	2	2	4	2
1934–35	Tulsa Oilers	AHA	1	0	0	0	5	—	—	—	—	—
1934–35	St. Louis Eagles	NHL	41	5	7	12	10	—	—	—	—	—
1935–36	Boston Bruins	NHL	48	11	10	21	17	2	2	1	3	2
1936–37	Boston Bruins	NHL	46	13	21	34	4	3	0	3	3	0
1937–38	Boston Bruins	NHL	48	17	22	39	8	3	2	0	2	0
1938–39	Boston Bruins	NHL	34	8	**34**	42	2	12	3	**11**	**14**	2
1939–40	Boston Bruins	NHL	48	13	27	40	24	6	0	1	1	7
1940–41	Boston Bruins	NHL	46	17	**47**	**64**	16	2	0	0	0	0
1941–42	Boston Bruins	NHL	28	4	23	27	6	5	0	3	3	5
1942–43	Boston Bruins	NHL	48	27	**45**	72	10	9	1	7	8	4
1943–44	Boston Bruins	NHL	36	30	41	71	12	—	—	—	—	—
1944–45	Boston Bruins	NHL	49	25	40	65	12	7	3	3	6	0
1945–46	Boston Bruins	NHL	26	12	12	24	6	10	1	3	4	2
1946–47	Boston Bruins	NHL	51	13	25	38	16	5	0	2	2	0
NHL totals			549	195	354	549	143	64	12	34	46	22

Preceded by Tommy Anderson	Winner of the Hart Trophy; 1943	Succeeded by Babe Pratt
Preceded by Ebbie Goodfellow	Winner of the Hart Trophy; 1941	Succeeded by Tommy Anderson
Preceded by Milt Schmidt	NHL Scoring Champion; 1941	Succeeded by Bryan Hextall
Preceded by Dit Clapper	Boston Bruins captain 1944–45	Succeeded by Jack Crawford
