= Frank Stahan =

Canadian ice hockey player

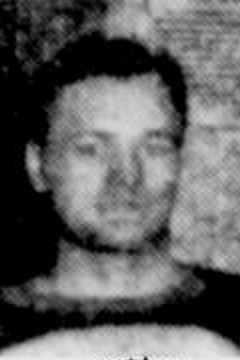
- Born: October 29, 1916; Minnedosa, Manitoba, Canada
- Died: May 25, 1995 (aged 78)
- Height: 6 ft 1 in (185 cm)
- Weight: 195 lb (88 kg; 13 st 13 lb)
- Position: Defence
- Shot: Left
- Played for: Montreal Canadiens
- Playing career: 1937–1957

Francis Ralph "Butch" Stahan (October 29, 1916 – May 25, 1995) was a Canadian professional ice hockey defenceman. He played three playoff games in the National Hockey League for the Montreal Canadiens during the 1944–45 season. The rest of his career, which lasted from 1937 to 1957, was spent in the minor leagues. He was born in Minnedosa, Manitoba.

== Career statistics ==
=== Regular season and playoffs ===
			Regular season					Playoffs
Season	Team	League	GP	G	A	Pts	PIM	GP	G	A	Pts	PIM
1934–35	Portage Terriers	MJHL	16	2	3	5	18	—	—	—	—	—
1935–36	Portage Terriers	MJHL	16	6	5	11	17	6	1	1	2	4
1936–37	Portage Terriers	MJHL	6	0	0	0	2	—	—	—	—	—
1936–37	Flin Flon Bombers	SSHL	18	6	4	10	43	6	0	0	0	8
1937–38	Brandon Wheat Kings	MJHL	16	1	6	7	16	5	0	0	0	0
1937–38	Flin Flon Bombers	SSHL	24	0	1	1	6	8	2	0	2	10
1938–39	Creighton Eagles	GBHL	7	3	0	3	27	1	0	0	0	2
1939–40	Kirkland Lake Blue Devils	Exhib	13	2	2	4	32	—	—	—	—	—
1939–40	Kirkland Lake Blue Devils	Al-Cup	—	—	—	—	—	5	1	1	2	4
1940–41	Quebec Aces	QSHL	36	6	12	18	60	4	0	1	1	22
1941–42	Quebec Aces	QSHL	40	7	12	19	76	7	1	1	2	14
1941–42	Quebec Aces	Al-Cup	—	—	—	—	—	8	1	4	5	14
1942–43	Quebec Morton Aces	QSHL	34	12	23	35	83	4	3	1	4	5
1942–43	Port Arthur Bearcats	Al-Cup	—	—	—	—	—	3	0	0	0	6
1943–44	Quebec Aces	QSHL	25	7	21	28	74	—	—	—	—	—
1943–44	Quebec Aces	Al-Cup	—	—	—	—	—	9	6	5	11	24
1944–45	Montreal Royals	QSHL	19	7	11	18	72	4	0	1	1	14
1944–45	Montreal Canadiens	NHL	—	—	—	—	—	3	0	1	1	2
1944–45	Sudbury Open Pit Miners	Al-Cup	—	—	—	—	—	1	0	0	0	0
1945–46	Montreal Royals	QSHL	39	9	15	24	76	11	3	2	5	34
1946–47	Ottawa Senators	QSHL	40	10	26	36	116	9	2	8	10	30
1947–48	Ottawa Senators	QSHL	41	12	21	33	44	12	1	7	8	23
1947–48	Ottawa Senators	Al-Cup	—	—	—	—	—	13	1	4	5	44
1948–49	Ottawa Senators	QSHL	62	9	34	43	92	11	0	3	3	14
1948–49	Ottawa Senators	Al-Cup	—	—	—	—	—	3	0	0	0	0
1949–50	Ottawa Senators	QSHL	60	9	18	27	116	7	0	4	4	16
1950–51	Ottawa Senators	QSHL	56	2	22	24	106	11	2	3	5	18
1951–52	Ottawa Senators	QSHL	59	10	16	26	76	7	2	0	2	4
1952–53	Ottawa Senators	QSHL	56	3	13	16	118	9	0	2	2	14
1953–54	Ottawa Senators	QSHL	34	0	5	5	56	2	0	0	0	4
1953–54	Pembroke Lumber Kings	NOHA	11	1	1	2	24	—	—	—	—	—
1954–55	Ottawa Senators	QSHL	8	0	1	1	23	—	—	—	—	—
1954–55	Toledo Mercurys	IHL	30	0	13	13	63	2	0	1	1	4
1955–56	Toledo Mercurys	IHL	59	4	29	33	198	9	2	3	5	12
1956–57	Toledo Mercurys	IHL	60	7	22	29	96	5	1	2	3	4
QSHL totals			608	103	250	353	1188	104	15	35	50	231
NHL totals			—	—	—	—	—	3	0	1	1	2
