= John Mahaffy =

John Mahaffy is the name of:

- John Pentland Mahaffy (1839–1919), Irish classicist and polymathic scholar
- John Mahaffy (ice hockey) (1918–2015), Canadian hockey player
