= Eddie Emberg =

Canadian ice hockey player

- Born: November 18, 1921; Montreal, Quebec, Canada
- Died: March 28, 2007 (aged 85)
- Position: forward
- Played for: Montreal Canadiens
- Playing career: 1942–1952

Edwin Angus Emberg (November 18, 1921 – March 28, 2007) was a Canadian professional ice hockey forward who played two playoff games in the National Hockey League for the Montreal Canadiens during the 1944–45 season, and scored one goal. The rest of his career, which lasted from 1942 to 1952, was mainly spent in the Quebec Senior Hockey League. He was born in Montreal, Quebec.

== Career statistics ==
=== Regular season and playoffs ===
| | | | Regular season | | | | | Playoffs |
| Season | Team | League | GP | G | A | Pts | PIM | GP | G | A | Pts | PIM |
|---|---|---|---|---|---|---|---|---|---|---|---|---|
| 1939–40 | Loyola College | SCSHL | — | — | — | — | — | — | — | — | — | — |
| 1940–41 | Verdun Red Devils | QJAHA | 12 | 11 | 6 | 17 | 4 | 2 | 1 | 0 | 1 | 0 |
| 1941–42 | Montreal Junior Royals | QJAHA | 12 | 11 | 9 | 20 | 4 | 2 | 5 | 2 | 7 | 2 |
| 1941–42 | Montreal Royals | QSHL | 1 | 1 | 0 | 1 | 0 | — | — | — | — | — |
| 1941–42 | Montreal Junior Royals | M-Cup | — | — | — | — | — | 9 | 8 | 8 | 16 | 9 |
| 1942–43 | Montreal RCAF | MCHL | 8 | 4 | 12 | 16 | 0 | 1 | 0 | 0 | 0 | 0 |
| 1942–43 | Montreal RCAF | QSHL | 26 | 7 | 10 | 17 | 0 | 12 | 1 | 2 | 3 | 0 |
| 1943–44 | Montreal RCAF | QSHL | 1 | 0 | 0 | 0 | 0 | 3 | 7 | 2 | 9 | 2 |
| 1944–45 | Montreal RCAF | MCHL | 3 | 3 | 2 | 5 | 0 | — | — | — | — | — |
| 1944–45 | Quebec Aces | QSHL | 12 | 5 | 3 | 8 | 7 | 7 | 6 | 4 | 10 | 4 |
| 1944–45 | Quebec Aces | Al-Cup | — | — | — | — | — | 3 | 1 | 0 | 1 | 0 |
| 1944–45 | Montreal Canadiens | NHL | — | — | — | — | — | 2 | 1 | 0 | 1 | 0 |
| 1945–46 | Quebec Aces | QSHL | 31 | 19 | 7 | 26 | 18 | 6 | 2 | 2 | 4 | 0 |
| 1946–47 | Valleyfield Braves | QSHL | 40 | 23 | 44 | 67 | 10 | — | — | — | — | — |
| 1946–47 | Boston Olympics | EAHL | — | — | — | — | — | 2 | 4 | 1 | 5 | 2 |
| 1947–48 | Ottawa Senators | QSHL | 36 | 29 | 24 | 53 | 13 | 12 | 4 | 4 | 8 | 2 |
| 1947–48 | Ottawa Senators | Al-Cup | — | — | — | — | — | 14 | 6 | 8 | 14 | 2 |
| 1948–49 | Ottawa Senators | QSHL | 62 | 31 | 53 | 84 | 27 | 11 | 2 | 5 | 7 | 8 |
| 1948–49 | Ottawa Senators | Al-Cup | — | — | — | — | — | 6 | 3 | 0 | 3 | 0 |
| 1949–50 | Ottawa Senators | QSHL | 59 | 22 | 47 | 69 | 16 | 7 | 3 | 5 | 8 | 2 |
| 1950–51 | Ottawa Senators | QSHL | 58 | 19 | 41 | 60 | 16 | 5 | 0 | 3 | 3 | 0 |
| 1951–52 | Ottawa Senators | QSHL | 60 | 11 | 26 | 37 | 28 | — | — | — | — | — |
| QSHL totals | | | 386 | 167 | 255 | 422 | 135 | 63 | 25 | 27 | 52 | 18 |
| NHL totals | | | — | — | — | — | — | 2 | 1 | 0 | 1 | 0 |
