= Cully Simon =

Canadian ice hockey player

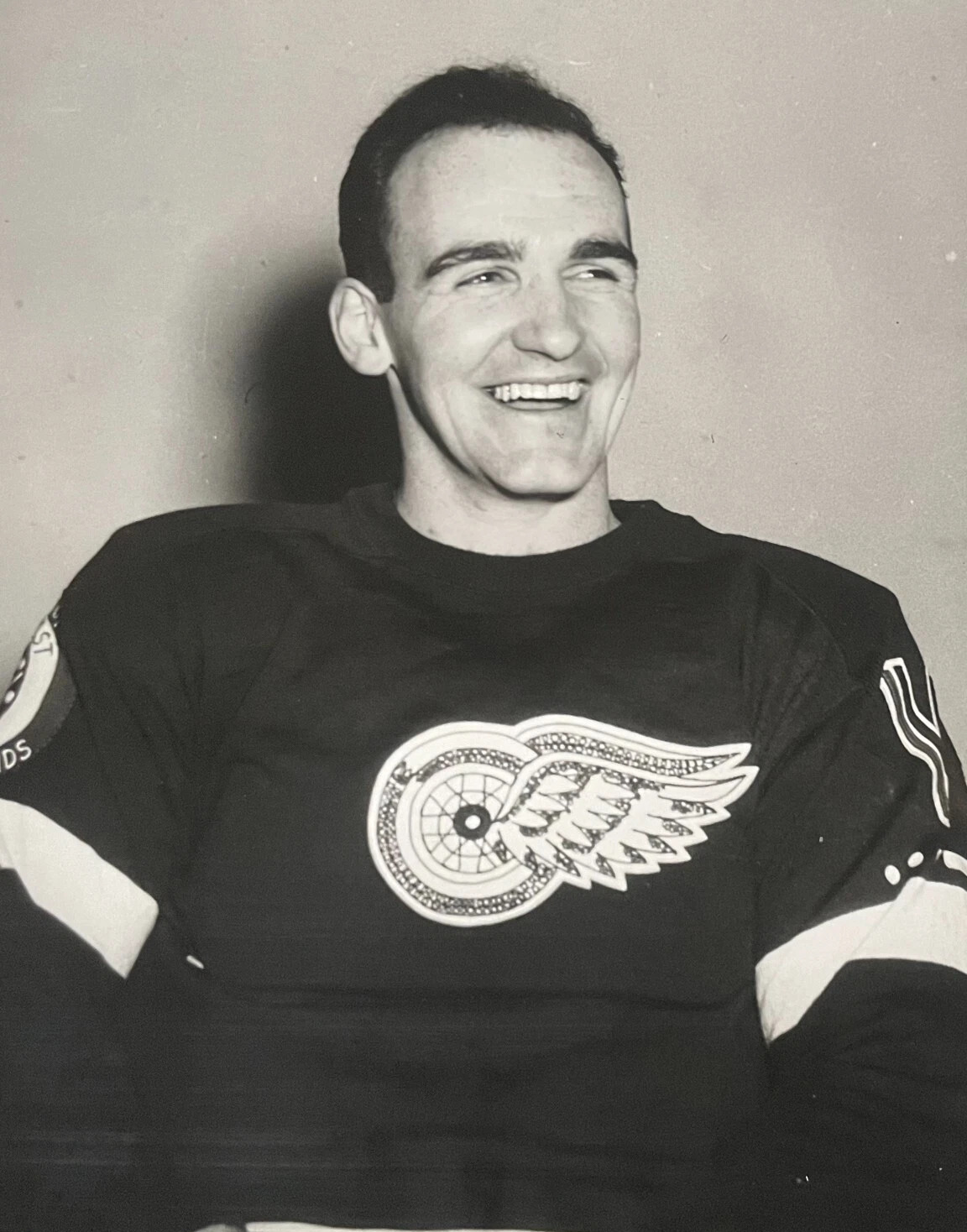
- Simon, c. 1943
- Born: May 18, 1918 Brockville, Ontario, Canada
- Died: August 2, 1980 (aged 62)
- Height: 5 ft 10 in (178 cm)
- Weight: 190 lb (86 kg; 13 st 8 lb)
- Position: Defence
- Shot: Right
- Played for: Detroit Red Wings; Chicago Black Hawks
- Playing career: 1939–1945

John Cullen Simon (May 8, 1918 – August 2, 1980) was a Canadian professional ice hockey player who played 130 games in the National Hockey League with the Detroit Red Wings and Chicago Black Hawks between 1942 and 1945. He was born in Brockville, Ontario. Simon's name was added to the Stanley Cup in 1943 with Detroit. Cully is the brother of the former NHL player, Thain Simon.

== Career statistics ==
			Regular season					Playoffs
Season	Team	League	GP	G	A	Pts	PIM	GP	G	A	Pts	PIM
1937–38	Pembroke Lumber Kings	OCJHL	7	5	5	10	14	2	2	2	4	8
1938–39	Valleyfield Braves	QPHL	3	0	0	0	2	—	—	—	—	—
1939–40	Verdun Bulldogs	QPHL	41	3	7	10	44	2	0	0	0	2
1940–41	Cornwall Flyers	QSHL	36	2	10	12	53	4	0	0	0	9
1941–42	Omaha Knights	AHA	38	0	5	5	49	8	0	1	1	20
1941–42	Kitchener Army	TIHL	—	—	—	—	—	1	0	0	0	2
1942–43	Detroit Red Wings	NHL	34	1	1	2	34	9	1	0	1	4
1942–43	Indianapolis Capitals	AHL	17	1	4	5	8	—	—	—	—	—
1942–43	Washington Lions	AHL	1	0	0	0	0	—	—	—	—	—
1943–44	Detroit Red Wings	NHL	46	3	7	10	52	5	0	0	0	2
1944–45	Detroit Red Wings	NHL	22	0	3	3	21	—	—	—	—	—
1944–45	Chicago Black Hawks	NHL	28	0	0	0	14	—	—	—	—	—
1945–46	Pembroke Lumber Kings	UOVHL	—	—	—	—	—	—	—	—	—	—
1946–47	Pembroke Lumber Kings	UOVHL	24	4	8	12	18	8	0	4	4	20
1947–48	Pembroke Lumber Kings	UOVHL	14	4	3	7	28	5	1	1	2	9
1948–49	Pembroke Lumber Kings	UOVHL	9	1	2	3	8	9	1	1	2	8
1948–49	Pembroke Lumber Kings	Al-Cup	—	—	—	—	—	9	4	3	7	22
1949–50	Pembroke Lumber Kings	ECSHL	34	5	16	21	47	4	0	1	1	9
1950–51	Pembroke Lumber Kings	ECSHL	31	1	12	13	40	8	0	4	4	10
1951–52	Pembroke Lumber Kings	ECSHL	36	2	16	18	46	9	3	3	6	19
1951–52	Pembroke Lumber Kings	Al-Cup	—	—	—	—	—	13	0	5	5	28
NHL totals			130	4	11	15	121	14	1	0	1	6
