= Thain Simon =

Canadian ice hockey player

- Born: April 24, 1922 Brockville, ON, CAN
- Died: September 18, 2007 (aged 85) Pembroke, ON, CAN
- Height: 5 ft 11 in (180 cm)
- Weight: 195 lb (88 kg; 13 st 13 lb)
- Position: Defence
- Shot: Left
- Played for: Detroit Red Wings
- Playing career: 1946–1949

Thain Andrew Simon (April 24, 1922 — September 18, 2007) was a Canadian ice hockey defenceman. He played three games in the National Hockey League for the Detroit Red Wings during the 1946–47 season. Thain is the brother of the former NHL player, Cully Simon.

Simon was born in Brockville, Ontario.

== Career statistics ==
=== Regular season and playoffs ===
			Regular season					Playoffs
Season	Team	League	GP	G	A	Pts	PIM	GP	G	A	Pts	PIM
1941–42	Brantford Lions	OHA	23	15	8	23	21	7	1	6	7	10
1942–43	Ottawa RCAF Flyers	OCHL	16	1	4	5	4	8	0	2	2	16
1945–46	Pembroke Lumber Kings	UOVHL	7	1	1	2	4	3	0	0	0	7
1945–46	Ottawa RCAF Flyers	Al-Cup	—	—	—	—	—	9	0	0	0	6
1945–46	Pembroke Lumber Kings	Al-Cup	—	—	—	—	—	9	0	5	5	10
1946–47	Indianapolis Capitals	AHL	46	2	4	6	14	—	—	—	—	—
1946–47	Detroit Red Wings	NHL	3	0	0	0	0	—	—	—	—	—
1947–48	Indianapolis Capitals	AHL	9	1	0	1	4	—	—	—	—	—
1947–48	Omaha Knights	USHL	33	1	3	4	21	—	—	—	—	—
1948–49	St. Louis Flyers	AHA	65	4	6	10	14	7	0	1	1	4
1949–50	Pembroke Lumber Kings	ECSHL	34	3	11	14	28	3	0	1	1	4
1950–51	Pembroke Lumber Kings	ECSHL	32	3	8	11	26	8	2	4	6	2
1951–52	Pembroke Lumber Kings	ECSHL	40	4	15	19	24	11	0	1	1	6
1951–52	Pembroke Lumber Kings	Al-Cup	—	—	—	—	—	13	0	5	5	12
1952–53	Pembroke Lumber Kings	UOVHL	—	—	—	—	—	—	—	—	—	—
NHL totals			3	0	0	0	0	—	—	—	—	—
