= Guy Labrie =

Canadian ice hockey player

- Born: August 11, 1920 Saint-Charles-de-Bellechasse, Quebec, Canada
- Died: May 12, 1974 (aged 53) Sillery, Quebec, Canada
- Height: 6 ft 0 in (183 cm)
- Weight: 185 lb (84 kg; 13 st 3 lb)
- Position: Defence
- Shot: Left
- Played for: Boston Bruins; New York Rangers
- Playing career: 1939–1954

Joseph Marie Louis Guy Labrie (August 11, 1920 — May 12, 1974) was a Canadian ice hockey player who played 42 games in the National Hockey League for the Boston Bruins and New York Rangers between 1943 and 1945. The rest of his career, which lasted from 1939 to 1954, was mainly spent in the Quebec Senior Hockey League. He was born in Saint-Charles-de-Bellechasse, Quebec.

== Career statistics ==
=== Regular season and playoffs ===
			Regular season					Playoffs
Season	Team	League	GP	G	A	Pts	PIM	GP	G	A	Pts	PIM
1939–40	Quebec Castors	QPHL	41	12	6	18	57	—	—	—	—	—
1940–41	Valleyfield Braves	MCHL	41	14	12	26	48	—	—	—	—	—
1941–42	Quebec Aces	QSHL	11	1	0	1	10	—	—	—	—	—
1943–44	Boston Bruins	NHL	15	2	7	9	2	—	—	—	—	—
1943–44	Boston Olympics	EAHL	26	24	14	38	8	10	1	10	11	4
1944–45	Boston Olympics	NHL	9	6	8	14	10	—	—	—	—	—
1944–45	New York Rangers	NHL	27	2	2	4	14	—	—	—	—	—
1945–46	Providence Reds	AHL	11	0	2	2	8	—	—	—	—	—
1945–46	New Haven Eagles	AHL	48	4	14	18	29	—	—	—	—	—
1946–47	Quebec Aces	QSHL	17	1	2	3	18	2	1	1	2	0
1947–48	Quebec Aces	QSHL	45	6	18	24	42	10	2	4	6	21
1948–49	Quebec Aces	QSHL	48	6	8	14	64	3	0	0	0	0
1949–50	Sherbrooke Saints	QSHL	58	8	15	23	56	12	1	6	7	18
1949–50	Sherbrooke Saints	Al-Cup	—	—	—	—	—	10	0	4	4	13
1950–51	Sherbrooke Saints	QSHL	47	3	18	21	56	7	1	3	4	2
1951–52	Sherbrooke Saints	QSHL	59	7	!8	25	38	11	0	3	3	2
1952–53	Sherbrooke Saints	QSHL	56	11	15	26	38	4	1	1	2	2
1953–54	Riviere-du-Loup Raiders	SLSHL	60	6	11	17	30	—	—	—	—	—
QSHL totals			341	43	94	137	322	49	6	18	24	45
NHL totals			42	4	9	13	16	—	—	—	—	—
