= Jack McLean (ice hockey) =

Canadian ice hockey player

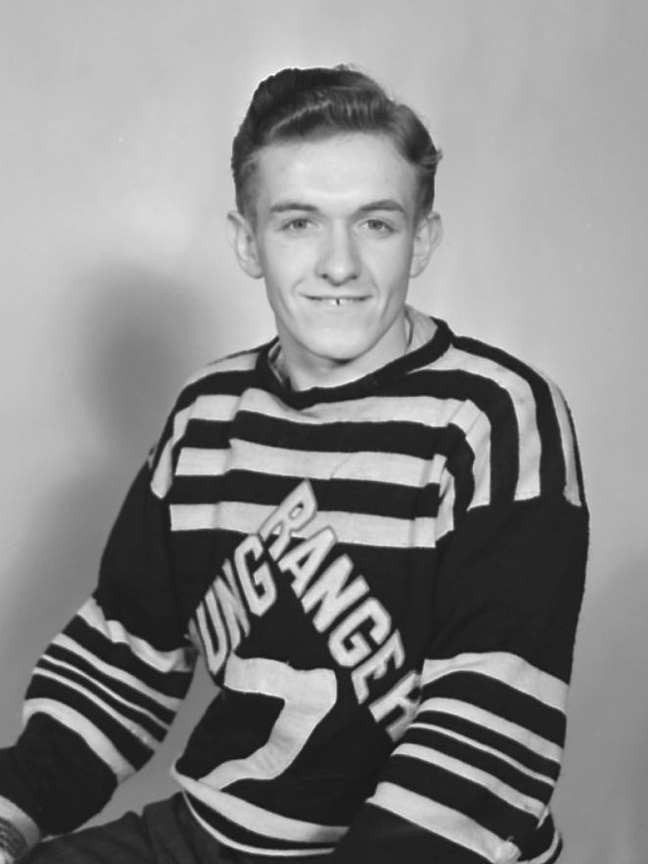
- McLean with the Young Rangers, 1940
- Born: January 31, 1923 Winnipeg, Manitoba, Canada
- Died: October 14, 2003 (aged 80) Ottawa, Ontario, Canada
- Height: 5 ft 8 in (173 cm)
- Weight: 165 lb (75 kg; 11 st 11 lb)
- Position: Centre
- Shot: Right
- Played for: Toronto Maple Leafs
- Playing career: 1939–1949

John Allan McLean (January 31, 1923 – October 14, 2003) was a Canadian ice hockey center who played for the Toronto Maple Leafs for three seasons, from 1942–43 until 1944–45.

== Early life ==
McLean was born in Winnipeg, Manitoba and was a 19-year-old engineering student at the University of Toronto when he joined the Leafs, playing forward at a time when many regulars left to serve in World War II.

== Career ==
McLean did not practise with the Leafs, and with but a few exceptions, was allowed only to play games in Canada (at home in Toronto and Montreal). Whereas many young men dreamed of playing in the NHL, Jack used his NHL career to obtain a university degree in engineering, which became his career after retiring in 1945.

He scored the game-winning goal at the 10:18 mark of the fourth overtime period against the Detroit Red Wings on March 23, 1943 - one of the longest games in Stanley Cup playoffs history. Jack was part of the Toronto Maple Leafs' Stanley Cup championship in 1944–45.

After moving to Ottawa in 1946, McLean joined the Ottawa Senators of the Quebec Senior Hockey League and helped the team win the Allan Cup final in 1948.

== Career statistics ==
=== Regular season and playoffs ===
| | | | Regular season | | | | | Playoffs |
| Season | Team | League | GP | G | A | Pts | PIM | GP | G | A | Pts | PIM |
|---|---|---|---|---|---|---|---|---|---|---|---|---|
| 1939–40 | Toronto Young Rangers | OHA | 20 | 8 | 10 | 18 | 12 | 2 | 0 | 0 | 0 | 2 |
| 1939–40 | Toronto People's Credit | TIHL | 23 | 3 | 6 | 9 | 30 | 3 | 0 | 1 | 1 | 4 |
| 1940–41 | Toronto Young Rangers | OHA | 14 | 8 | 7 | 15 | 27 | 5 | 4 | 3 | 7 | 8 |
| 1940–41 | Toronto People's Credit | TIHL | 23 | 3 | 6 | 9 | 30 | 3 | 0 | 1 | 1 | 4 |
| 1941–42 | Toronto Young Rangers | OHA | 16 | 17 | 13 | 30 | 22 | 6 | 4 | 4 | 8 | 6 |
| 1941–42 | Toronto People's Credit | TIHL | 13 | 4 | 3 | 7 | 21 | 1 | 0 | 0 | 0 | 2 |
| 1942–43 | Toronto Maple Leafs | AHL | 27 | 9 | 8 | 17 | 33 | 6 | 2 | 2 | 4 | 2 |
| 1943–44 | Toronto Maple Leafs | NHL | 32 | 3 | 15 | 18 | 40 | 3 | 0 | 0 | 0 | 6 |
| 1944–45 | Toronto Maple Leafs | NHL | 8 | 2 | 1 | 3 | 13 | 4 | 0 | 0 | 0 | 0 |
| 1945–46 | Toronto Staffords | OHA Sr | 11 | 9 | 6 | 15 | 14 | 6 | 2 | 1 | 3 | 6 |
| 1946–47 | Ottawa Senators | QSHL | 24 | 11 | 17 | 28 | 35 | 7 | 0 | 2 | 2 | 8 |
| 1947–48 | Ottawa Senators | QSHL | 41 | 26 | 14 | 40 | 50 | 12 | 3 | 3 | 6 | 16 |
| 1947–48 | Ottawa Senators | Al-Cup | — | — | — | — | — | 12 | 4 | 3 | 7 | 20 |
| NHL totals | | | 67 | 14 | 24 | 38 | 86 | 13 | 2 | 2 | 4 | 8 |
