= Butch McDonald =

Canadian ice hockey player

- Butch McDonald (right), with Gus Giesebrecht, as members of the Pittsburgh Yellow Jackets in 1937.
- Born: November 21, 1916 Assiniboia, Saskatchewan, Canada
- Died: January 8, 2006 (aged 89) British Columbia, Canada
- Height: 6 ft 0 in (183 cm)
- Weight: 185 lb (84 kg; 13 st 3 lb)
- Position: Left wing/Centre
- Shot: Left
- Played for: Chicago Black Hawks; Detroit Red Wings
- Playing career: 1934–1951

Byron Russell "Butch" McDonald (November 21, 1916 – January 8, 2006) was a Canadian ice hockey left winger who played 66 games in the National Hockey League with the Detroit Red Wings and Chicago Black Hawks between 1939 and 1945. The rest of his career, which lasted from 1934 to 1951, was spent in various minor leagues. He was born in Assiniboia, Saskatchewan.

== Playing career ==
Byron McDonald played 66 games in the NHL for the Detroit Red Wings and Chicago Black Hawks in 1939–40 and 1944–45.

== Career statistics ==
=== Regular season and playoffs ===
| | | | Regular season | | | | | Playoffs |
| Season | Team | League | GP | G | A | Pts | PIM | GP | G | A | Pts | PIM |
|---|---|---|---|---|---|---|---|---|---|---|---|---|
| 1934–35 | Moose Jaw Canucks | S-SJHL | 6 | 4 | 4 | 8 | 2 | — | — | — | — | — |
| 1934–35 | Moose Jaw Canucks | M-Cup | — | — | — | — | — | 6 | 4 | 4 | 8 | 12 |
| 1935–36 | Regina Capitals | S-SSHL | — | 5 | 10 | 15 | 14 | — | — | — | — | — |
| 1936–37 | Pittsburgh Yellow Jackets | EAHL | 47 | 16 | 20 | 36 | 30 | — | — | — | — | — |
| 1937–38 | New Haven Eagles | IAHL | 11 | 0 | 1 | 1 | 0 | — | — | — | — | — |
| 1937–38 | Pittsburgh Hornets | IAHL | 31 | 0 | 1 | 1 | 2 | 1 | 0 | 0 | 0 | 0 |
| 1938–39 | Minneapolis Millers | AHA | 48 | 31 | 42 | 73 | 21 | 4 | 0 | 1 | 1 | 0 |
| 1938–39 | Pittsburgh Hornets | IAHL | 1 | 1 | 0 | 1 | 0 | — | — | — | — | — |
| 1939–40 | Detroit Red Wings | NHL | 37 | 1 | 6 | 7 | 2 | 5 | 0 | 2 | 2 | 10 |
| 1939–40 | Indianapolis Capitals | IAHL | 15 | 4 | 13 | 17 | 4 | — | — | — | — | — |
| 1940–41 | Indianapolis Capitals | AHL | 51 | 13 | 17 | 30 | 8 | — | — | — | — | — |
| 1941–42 | Moose Jaw Millers | SSHL | 30 | 13 | 17 | 30 | 8 | 9 | 2 | 7 | 9 | 2 |
| 1942–43 | Regina Army Corps | SSHL | 21 | 30 | 31 | 51 | 2 | 1 | 0 | 0 | 0 | 0 |
| 1944–45 | Detroit Red Wings | NHL | 3 | 1 | 1 | 2 | 0 | — | — | — | — | — |
| 1944–45 | Indianapolis Capitals | AHL | 29 | 8 | 25 | 33 | 2 | — | — | — | — | — |
| 1944–45 | Chicago Black Hawks | NHL | 26 | 6 | 13 | 19 | 0 | — | — | — | — | — |
| 1945–46 | Kansas City Pla-Mors | USHL | 51 | 39 | 60 | 99 | 5 | 12 | 2 | 8 | 10 | 0 |
| 1946–47 | Kansas City Pla-Mors | USHL | 51 | 16 | 52 | 68 | — | 12 | 2 | 6 | 8 | 0 |
| 1947–48 | Calgary Stampeders | WCSHL | 47 | 21 | 47 | 68 | 14 | 11 | 4 | 5 | 9 | 5 |
| 1948–49 | Calgary Stampeders | WCSHL | 47 | 17 | 43 | 60 | 12 | 4 | 1 | 1 | 2 | 6 |
| 1949–50 | Calgary Stampeders | WCSHL | 10 | 4 | 7 | 11 | 0 | — | — | — | — | — |
| 1950–51 | Calgary Stampeders | WCSHL | — | — | — | — | — | — | — | — | — | — |
| IAHL/AHL totals | | | 138 | 26 | 70 | 96 | 10 | — | — | — | — | — |
| NHL totals | | | 66 | 8 | 20 | 28 | 2 | 5 | 0 | 2 | 2 | 10 |
