= Elwyn Morris =

Canadian ice hockey player

- Born: January 3, 1921 Toronto, Ontario, Canada
- Died: February 6, 2000 (aged 79) Stratford, Ontario, Canada
- Height: 5 ft 8 in (173 cm)
- Weight: 187 lb (85 kg; 13 st 5 lb)
- Position: Defence
- Shot: Right
- Played for: Toronto Maple Leafs; New York Rangers
- Playing career: 1939–1955

Elwyn Gordon "Moe" Morris (January 3, 1921 – February 6, 2000) was a Canadian ice hockey player who played in the National Hockey League with the Toronto Maple Leafs and New York Rangers between 1943 and 1949. The rest of his career, which lasted from 1939 to 1955, was spent in various minor leagues. He was born in Toronto, Ontario.

== Playing career ==
Morris played 135 games over a five-year period from 1944 to 1949 in the National Hockey League for the Toronto Maple Leafs and New York Rangers. He scored 13 goals and added 29 assists for 42 points. He won the Stanley Cup in 1945 with the Toronto Maple Leafs. He also played for the Toronto Marlboros (Ontario Hockey Association) starting in 1943, until being called up by the Maple Leafs.

== Career statistics ==
=== Regular season and playoffs ===
			Regular season					Playoffs
Season	Team	League	GP	G	A	Pts	PIM	GP	G	A	Pts	PIM
1937–38	Toronto Marlboros	OHA	10	6	3	9	0	6	3	0	3	2
1938–39	Toronto Marlboros	OHA	7	3	1	4	0	2	1	0	1	0
1939–40	Toronto Marlboros	OHA	19	13	16	29	9	5	1	0	1	0
1939–40	Toronto Tip Tops	TIHL	22	5	6	11	6	3	0	0	0	2
1939–40	Toronto Ostrander Jewels	TMHL	6	9	3	12	4	4	3	2	5	0
1940–41	Toronto Marlboros	OHA	16	7	17	24	12	12	1	4	5	2
1940–41	Toronto Tip Tops	TIHL	22	5	6	11	6	3	0	0	0	2
1941–42	Toronto Marlboros	OHA	20	2	9	11	17	6	0	2	2	0
1941–42	Toronto Kodaks	TMHL	13	1	0	1	—	2	0	1	1	0
1942–43	Toronto Navy	TNDHL	11	6	10	16	8	10	1	7	8	15
1943–44	Toronto Maple Leafs	NHL	50	13	21	34	22	5	1	2	3	2
1943–44	Toronto Ostrander Jewels	TMHL	6	9	3	12	4	—	—	—	—	—
1944–45	Toronto Maple Leafs	NHL	29	0	2	2	18	13	3	0	3	14
1945–46	Toronto Maple Leafs	NHL	38	1	5	6	10	—	—	—	—	—
1945–46	Pittsburgh Hornets	AHL	10	0	7	7	0	—	—	—	—	—
1946–47	Pittsburgh Hornets	AHL	64	2	15	17	45	12	0	2	2	6
1947–48	Pittsburgh Hornets	AHL	56	0	13	13	14	2	0	0	0	0
1948–49	New York Rangers	NHL	18	0	1	1	8	—	—	—	—	—
1948–49	Providence Reds	AHL	45	1	18	19	13	14	1	0	1	4
1949–50	Providence Reds	AHL	58	1	12	13	11	4	0	2	2	0
1950–51	Providence Reds	AHL	69	8	13	21	18	—	—	—	—	—
1951–52	Providence Reds	AHL	67	2	17	19	21	15	2	2	4	4
1952–53	Providence Reds	AHL	51	4	13	17	13	—	—	—	—	—
1953–54	Owen Sound Mercurys	OHA Sr	52	9	28	37	12	10	0	7	7	2
1953–54	Owen Sound Mercurys	Al-Cup	—	—	—	—	—	7	0	2	2	2
1954–55	Stratford Indians	OHA Sr	50	1	1	2	18	—	—	—	—	—
AHL totals			420	18	108	126	135	47	3	6	9	14
NHL totals			135	14	29	43	58	18	4	2	6	16
