= Mel Hill =

Canadian ice hockey player

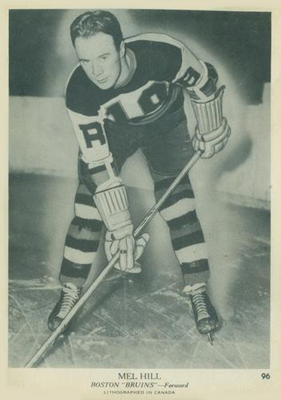
- Born: February 15, 1915 RM of Argyle, Manitoba, Canada
- Died: April 11, 1996 (aged 81) Fort Qu'Appelle, Saskatchewan, Canada
- Height: 5 ft 10 in (178 cm)
- Weight: 175 lb (79 kg; 12 st 7 lb)
- Position: Right wing
- Shot: Right
- Played for: Boston Bruins; Brooklyn Americans; Toronto Maple Leafs
- Playing career: 1932–1952

John Melvin Hill (February 15, 1915 – April 11, 1996) was an ice hockey right winger who was best known for his record three overtime goals in a playoff series in the 1939 playoffs which earned him the moniker, "Sudden Death". He was born in Argyle, Manitoba.

== Playing career ==
Hill started playing for the Boston Bruins of the National Hockey League in 1937–38, and played only six games, scoring two goals. The next season, he scored ten goals and had twenty points, but it was in the playoffs that year that he rose into prominence. In the semi-finals that year against the New York Rangers, he scored three sudden-death overtime goals to help the Bruins knock off the Rangers and go on to win the Stanley Cup. All in all, he had six goals and nine points in twelve games in the playoffs that year.

Hill was traded to the Brooklyn Americans for cash on June 27, 1941. He only played one season in Brooklyn as the team folded, but he scored 37 points in 47 games. After the season his rights were transferred to the Toronto Maple Leafs in the dispersal draft of Americans' players. The 1942–43 proved to be Hill's best in the NHL, as he scored seventeen goals and forty-four points in forty-nine games. He would go on to produce for the Leafs for three more seasons, before moving down to the Pittsburgh Hornets of the American Hockey League for his final two professional seasons. Following that, he played four seasons of senior hockey with the Regina Capitals, leading them to the 1949 Allan Cup finals, his last seasons in organized hockey.

=== Soccer career ===
Hill played senior soccer in Saskatoon League with Saskatoon Legion Sons.

== Legacy ==
Hill finished his NHL career with 89 goals and 198 points in 324 games, and played for three Stanley Cup champions for Boston in 1939 and 1941, and Toronto in 1945. As of 2023, his mark of three overtime winning goals in a single playoff season remains unsurpassed as the NHL record.

Hill was also an accomplished soccer player who played for Saskatoon Legion in the late 1930s. He was selected for the Saskatchewan all star teams that played against the touring Islington Corinthians from England in 1938 and the touring Scottish F.A. team in 1939. Hill played on the left wing.

== After hockey ==
After his hockey career he owned and operated a Pepsi-Cola and Canada Dry bottling plant in Regina, Saskatchewan. Hill died at the age of 81 in 1996.

== Awards and achievements ==
- Stanley Cup Championships (1939, 1941 & 1945)
- "Honoured Member" of the Manitoba Hockey Hall of Fame

== Career statistics ==
			Regular season					Playoffs
Season	Team	League	GP	G	A	Pts	PIM	GP	G	A	Pts	PIM
1932–33	Saskatoon Tigers	N-SJHL	3	4	1	5	0	—	—	—	—	—
1932–33	Saskatoon Tigers	MC	—	—	—	—	—	3	4	0	4	0
1933–34	Saskatoon Wesleys	N-SJHL	4	3	2	5	0	9	12	7	19	2
1934–35	Sudbury Cub Wolves	NOJHA	10	9	4	13	8	5	2	1	3	0
1935–36	Sudbury Frood Miners	NBHL	10	7	6	13	15	—	—	—	—	—
1936–37	Sudbury Frood Miners	NBHL	15	18	5	23	10	2	1	0	1	0
1936–37	Sudbury Frood Miners	AC	—	—	—	—	—	14	8	14	22	6
1937–38	Boston Bruins	NHL	6	2	0	2	2	1	0	0	0	0
1937–38	Providence Reds	IAHL	40	13	10	23	0	7	4	2	6	0
1938–39	Boston Bruins	NHL	46	10	10	20	16	12	6	3	9	12
1939–40	Boston Bruins	NHL	38	9	11	20	19	3	0	0	0	0
1940–41	Boston Bruins	NHL	41	5	4	9	4	8	1	1	2	0
1940–41	Hershey Bears	AHL	5	1	5	6	4	—	—	—	—	—
1941–42	Springfield Indians	AHL	1	0	0	0	0	—	—	—	—	—
1941–42	Brooklyn Americans	NHL	47	14	23	37	10	—	—	—	—	—
1942–43	Toronto Maple Leafs	NHL	49	17	27	44	47	6	3	0	3	0
1943–44	Toronto Maple Leafs	NHL	17	9	10	19	6	—	—	—	—	—
1944–45	Toronto Maple Leafs	NHL	45	18	17	35	14	13	2	3	5	6
1945–46	Toronto Maple Leafs	NHL	35	5	7	12	10	—	—	—	—	—
1945–46	Pittsburgh Hornets	AHL	13	7	8	15	0	6	1	2	3	0
1946–47	Pittsburgh Hornets	AHL	62	26	36	62	42	13	3	6	9	6
1947–48	Pittsburgh Hornets	AHL	63	10	22	32	14	2	0	0	0	2
1948–49	Regina Capitals	WCSHL	43	23	30	53	11	8	4	6	10	4
1948–49	Regina Capitals	AC	—	—	—	—	—	14	8	6	14	11
1949–50	Regina Capitals	WCSHL	50	17	21	38	16	—	—	—	—	—
1950–51	Regina Capitals	MCMHL	22	3	5	8	6	—	—	—	—	—
1951–52	Regina Capitals	SSHL	17	7	11	18	16	3	1	0	1	9
NHL totals			324	89	109	198	128	43	12	7	19	18
