= Frank McCool =

Canadian ice hockey player

- Born: October 27, 1918 Calgary, Alberta, Canada
- Died: May 20, 1973 (aged 54) Alberta, Canada
- Height: 6 ft 0 in (183 cm)
- Weight: 170 lb (77 kg; 12 st 2 lb)
- Position: Goaltender
- Caught: Left
- Played for: Toronto Maple Leafs
- Playing career: 1937–1946

Tobias Francis McCool (October 27, 1918 – May 20, 1973) was a Canadian professional ice hockey goaltender who played for the Toronto Maple Leafs in the National Hockey League. He was born in Calgary, Alberta.

== Playing career ==
McCool played minor hockey in his hometown of Calgary with the Calgary Bronks of the Alberta Senior Hockey League. In 1937–38, McCool played in the Memorial Cup with the Calgary Canadians. In 1939–40, he enrolled at Gonzaga University and played hockey there from 1940 to 1942. In 1942–43, McCool enrolled in the army. He played for one season for the Calgary Currie Army before being discharged as medically unfit to serve.

After returning in 1944–45, he signed a free agent contract with the Toronto Maple Leafs. He was the top goaltender for the Leafs as he led them through the season and to the Stanley Cup. The Leafs beat the Detroit Red Wings in seven games and McCool set a franchise record for most shutouts in the postseason. He also set an NHL record for most consecutive shutouts in the postseason with three, a record that has been tied but not beaten to this day. He also held another Stanley Cup record for the fewest goals allowed in the Final with nine. This stood until the 2011 Stanley Cup Final, when it was beaten by Boston Bruins netminder Tim Thomas, who only gave up eight. McCool also set another milestone as he became the first NHL goaltender to record an assist. At the end of the season, McCool was the recipient of the Calder Memorial Trophy.

After just playing in 22 games in 1945–46, he retired after just two years because of severe ulcers. After his retirement, he became an assistant publisher and general manager for the Calgary Albertan. He suffered from ulcers during his career, and it was confirmed that ulcers played a part in his death on May 20, 1973.

== Legacy ==
Frank McCool has an arena named after him in the southeast community of Lake Bonavista in the city where he was born, Calgary, Alberta.

== Awards and achievements ==
- Calder Memorial Trophy winner in 1945.
- Stanley Cup champion in 1945.
- Shares NHL record for most consecutive shutouts in the postseason (3).
- Hold Toronto Maple Leafs record for most shutouts in the postseason (4).

== Career statistics ==
=== Regular season and playoffs ===
			Regular season								Playoffs
Season	Team	League	GP	W	L	T	Min	GA	SO	GAA	GP	W	L	Min	GA	SO	GAA
1936–37	Calgary Bronks	ASHL	2	—	—	—	120	9	0	4.50	—	—	—	—	—	—	—
1936–37	Calgary Canadians	CCJHL	1	—	—	—	60	3	0	3.00	—	—	—	—	—	—	—
1937–38	Calgary Columbus Club	CCSHL	12	—	—	—	720	47	1	3.92	3	—	—	180	8	0	2.67
1937–38	Calgary Canadians	M-Cup	—	—	—	—	—	—	—	—	4	1	3	240	19	0	4.75
1939–40	Gonzaga Bulldogs	WKHL	8	—	—	—	480	46	0	5.75	—	—	—	—	—	—	—
1940–41	Gonzaga Bulldogs	NCAA	—	—	—	—	—	—	—	—	—	—	—	—	—	—	—
1941–42	Gonzaga Bulldogs	NCAA	—	—	—	—	—	—	—	—	—	—	—	—	—	—	—
1942–43	Calgary Currie Army	ASHL	24	—	—	—	1440	81	1	3.37	5	2	3	300	20	0	4.00
1944–45	Toronto Maple Leafs	NHL	50	24	22	4	3000	161	4	3.22	13	8	5	807	30	4	2.23
1945–46	Toronto Maple Leafs	NHL	22	10	9	3	1320	81	0	3.68	—	—	—	—	—	—	—
NHL totals			72	34	31	7	4320	242	4	3.36	13	8	5	807	30	4	2.23

Preceded by August 'Gus' Bodnar	Winner of the Calder Memorial Trophy; 1945	Succeeded by Edgar Laprade
