= John Mahaffy (ice hockey) =

Canadian ice hockey player

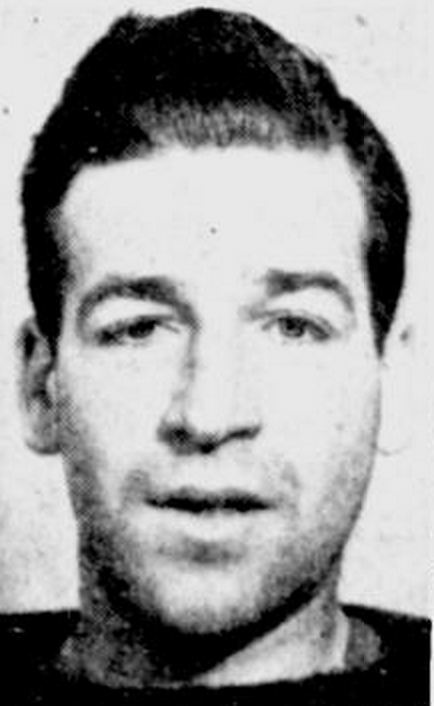
- Born: July 18, 1918; Montreal, Quebec, Canada
- Died: May 2, 2015 (aged 96); Brossard, Quebec, Canada
- Height: 5 ft 7 in (170 cm)
- Weight: 165 lb (75 kg; 11 st 11 lb)
- Position: Centre
- Shot: Left
- Played for: New York Rangers; Montreal Canadiens; Streatham
- Playing career: 1935–1952

John Mahaffy (July 18, 1918 – May 2, 2015) was a Canadian professional ice hockey centre. He played 37 games in the National Hockey League with the New York Rangers and Montreal Canadiens from 1942 to 1945. The rest of his career, which lasted from 1935 to 1952, was spent in the minor leagues. Mahaffy was born in Montreal, Quebec. He married Angie Péloquin around 1961. He died in May 2015 at the age of 96.

== Career statistics ==
=== Regular season and playoffs ===
			Regular season					Playoffs
Season A	Team	League	GP	G	A	Pts	PIM	GP	G	A	Pts	PIM
1934–35	Montreal Junior Royals	QJAHA	10	3	6	9	4	2	0	0	0	0
1935–36	Montreal Royals	Mtl Sr	7	5	6	11	4	—	—	—	—	—
1936–37	Montreal Royals	Mtl Sr	21	4	8	12	16	5	0	1	1	2
1937–38	Montreal Royals	MCHL	22	4	3	7	20	1	0	0	0	2
1938–39	Streatham	ENL	—	4	4	8	—	—	—	—	—	—
1939–40	Montreal Royals	MCHL	29	9	13	22	25	8	2	0	2	12
1939–40	Montreal Royals	Al-Cup	—	—	—	—	—	5	0	4	4	0
1940–41	Montreal Royals	MCHL	33	17	25	42	60	8	6	5	11	16
1940–41	Montreal Royals	Al-Cup	—	—	—	—	—	9	4	2	6	22
1941–42	Montreal Royals	QSHL	38	9	16	25	35	—	—	—	—	—
1942–43	Montreal Canadiens	NHL	9	2	5	7	4	—	—	—	—	—
1942–43	Montreal Royals	QSHL	28	21	16	37	14	7	4	2	6	4
1943–44	New York Rangers	NHL	28	9	20	29	0	—	—	—	—	—
1943–44	Montreal Army	MCHL	4	0	0	0	0	—	—	—	—	—
1943–44	Montreal Royals	QSHL	4	2	6	8	2	—	—	—	—	—
1944–45	Montreal Royals	QSHL	3	5	4	9	4	—	—	—	—	—
1944–45	Pittsburgh Hornets	AHL	37	17	23	40	10	—	—	—	—	—
1944–45	Montreal Canadiens	NHL	—	—	—	—	—	1	0	1	1	0
1945–46	Pittsburgh Hornets	AHL	58	28	36	64	35	6	4	2	6	10
1946–47	Buffalo Bisons	AHL	63	29	40	69	37	4	0	0	0	0
1947–48	Philadelphia Rockets	AHL	60	26	57	83	6	—	—	—	—	—
1948–49	Philadelphia Rockets	AHL	67	21	50	71	10	—	—	—	—	—
1949–50	Hershey Bears	AHL	69	23	36	59	13	—	—	—	—	—
1950–51	Hershey Bears	AHL	33	5	14	19	7	—	—	—	—	—
1951–52	Shawinigan Cataractes	QMHL	60	16	28	44	18	—	—	—	—	—
1952–53	St-Hyacinthe Saints	QPHL	61	28	58	86	—	—	—	—	—	—
AHL totals			387	149	256	405	118	10	4	2	6	10
NHL totals			37	11	25	36	4	1	0	1	1	0
