= 1944 Allan Cup =

Canadian senior ice hockey championship

The Allan Cup trophy

The 1944 Allan Cup was the Canadian senior ice hockey championship for the 1943–44 season.

== Final ==
Best of 5

- Quebec 6 Port Arthur 1
- Quebec 15 Port Arthur 4
- Quebec 9 Port Arthur 6

Quebec Aces beat Port Arthur Shipbuilders 3-0 on series.
