= 1944–45 NHL season =

Professional ice hockey league season

- League: National Hockey League
- Sport: Ice hockey
- Duration: October 28, 1944 – April 22, 1945
- Games: 50
- Teams: 6

Regular season
- Season champion: Montreal Canadiens
- Season MVP: Elmer Lach (Canadiens)
- Top scorer: Elmer Lach (Canadiens)

Stanley Cup
- Champions: Toronto Maple Leafs
- Runners-up: Detroit Red Wings

NHL seasons
- ← 1943–44 1945–46 →

The 1944–45 NHL season was the 28th season of the National Hockey League. Six teams played 50 games each. The Toronto Maple Leafs won the Stanley Cup in seven games against the Detroit Red Wings.

== League business ==
In October 1944, Lester Patrick sponsored W. G. Hardy to become NHL president, replacing Red Dutton who wanted to step down. Patrick credited Hardy for being largely responsible for the current professional-amateur agreement between the NHL and the amateur associations in the International Ice Hockey Association, and said he was "temperamentally suited and has an excellent record as an executive of the Canadian Amateur Hockey Association".

== Regular season ==
It was the year of the "Punch Line" as Rocket Richard scored 50 goals in 50 games, breaking Joe Malone's record of 44 goals, and when Richard scored his 45th, Malone was on hand to present him with the record-breaking puck. Richard had a five-goal, three-assist night against Detroit at the Montreal Forum on December 28, 1944. His centreman, Elmer Lach, though, won the scoring race with 26 goals and 80 points. Toe Blake finished third with 29 goals, 38 assists, and for the second time, an entire line finished first, second, third scoring. The previous time had been in 1939–40, when the Boston Bruins' Kraut Line of Milt Schmidt, Bobby Bauer and Woody Dumart accomplished the feat. Schmidt finished with 52 points in 48 games that year, and Bauer and Dumart 43 apiece.

Montreal dared not loan Paul Bibeault to Toronto again with his fine year the previous season and loaned him instead to Boston. But the Maple Leafs came up with a fine rookie named Frank McCool who won the Calder Memorial Trophy as the league's top rookie. For the first time, a team produced three consecutive top rookies. McCool and Chicago netminder Mike Karakas tied for the league lead in shutouts with four each.

Bill Durnan won his second consecutive Vezina Trophy with Montreal. Flash Hollett became the first defenceman to score twenty goals in one season. The record would stand until Bobby Orr broke it several decades later.

A major trade that occurred this year was Chicago trading their great defenceman Earl Seibert to Detroit for Don Grosso, Cully Simon and Byron "Butch" McDonald. After team owner Frederic McLaughlin died, it was just a matter of time before Bill Tobin would trade Seibert, as the two did not get along.

=== Final standings ===
National Hockey League
		GP	W	L	T	GF	GA	DIFF	Pts
1	Montreal Canadiens	50	38	8	4	228	121	+107	80
2	Detroit Red Wings	50	31	14	5	218	161	+57	67
3	Toronto Maple Leafs	50	24	22	4	183	161	+22	52
4	Boston Bruins	50	16	30	4	179	219	−40	36
5	Chicago Black Hawks	50	13	30	7	141	194	−53	33
6	New York Rangers	50	11	29	10	154	247	−93	32

== Playoffs ==
=== Playoff bracket ===
The top four teams in the league qualified for the playoffs. In the semifinals, the first-place team played the third-place team, while the second-place team faced the fourth-place team, with the winners advancing to the Stanley Cup Finals. In both rounds, teams competed in a best-of-seven series (scores in the bracket indicate the number of games won in each best-of-seven series).

Semifinals
1	Montreal	2
3	Toronto	4
2	Detroit	4
4	Boston	3

Stanley Cup Finals
3	Toronto	4
2	Detroit	3

=== Semifinals ===
==== (1) Montreal Canadiens vs. (3) Toronto Maple Leafs ====
The Montreal Canadiens finished first in the league with 80 points. The Toronto Maple Leafs finished third with 52 points. This was the fourth playoff meeting between these two teams with Montreal winning two of the three previous series. They last met in previous year's Stanley Cup Semifinals where the Canadiens won in five games. Toronto won this season's ten-game regular-season series earning eleven of twenty points.

March 20	Toronto Maple Leafs	1–0	Montreal Canadiens	Montreal Forum	Recap
No scoring		First period	No scoring
No scoring		Second period	No scoring
Ted Kennedy (1) – 19:38		Third period	No scoring
Frank McCool		Goalie stats	Bill Durnan

March 22	Toronto Maple Leafs	3–2	Montreal Canadiens	Montreal Forum	Recap
Ted Kennedy (2) – pp – 04:07		First period	No scoring
Lorne Carr (1) – 10:58; Nick Metz (1) – 15:37		Second period	08:15 – pp – Butch Bouchard (1)
No scoring		Third period	17:21 – pp – Elmer Lach (1)
Frank McCool		Goalie stats	Bill Durnan

March 24	Montreal Canadiens	4–1	Toronto Maple Leafs	Maple Leaf Gardens	Recap
Elmer Lach (2) – 11:14		First period	No scoring
Bob Fillion (1) – sh – 07:58; Dutch Hiller (1) – 11:14; Murph Chamberlain (1) – 18:55		Second period	No scoring
No scoring		Third period	09:02 – pp – Bob Davidson (1)
Bill Durnan		Goalie stats	Frank McCool

March 27	Montreal Canadiens	3–4	OT	Toronto Maple Leafs	Maple Leaf Gardens	Recap
Elmer Lach (3) – 00:23; Maurice Richard (1) – 02:13		First period		No scoring
No scoring		Second period		02:34 – Mel Hill (1); 16:15 – Sweeney Schriner (1)
Bob Fillion (2) – pp – 03:47		Third period		09:15 – Babe Pratt (1)
No scoring		First overtime period		12:36 – Gus Bodnar (1)
Bill Durnan		Goalie stats		Frank McCool

March 29	Toronto Maple Leafs	3–10	Montreal Canadiens	Montreal Forum	Recap
Lorne Carr (2) – pp – 07:37; Ted Kennedy (3) – pp – 08:10		First period	00:40 – Leo Lamoureux (1); 03:08 – sh – Butch Bouchard (2); 06:02 – Eddie Emberg (1)
Moe Morris (1) – 12:16		Second period	06:36 – Glen Harmon (1); 13:25 – Maurice Richard (2)
No scoring		Third period	01:10 – Maurice Richard (3); 01:35 – Elmer Lach (4); 10:48 – Maurice Richard (4); 15:03 – Maurice Richard (5); 19:06 – Bob Fillion (3)
Frank McCool		Goalie stats	Bill Durnan

March 31	Montreal Canadiens	2–3	Toronto Maple Leafs	Maple Leaf Gardens	Recap
Maurice Richard (6) – 18:38		First period	13:59 – Moe Morris (2)
No scoring		Second period	07:11 – Sweeney Schriner (2)
Butch Bouchard (3) – 15:26		Third period	01:53 – Gus Bodnar (2)
Bill Durnan		Goalie stats	Frank McCool

Toronto won series 4–2

==== (2) Detroit Red Wings vs. (4) Boston Bruins ====
The Detroit Red Wings finished second in the league with 67 points. The Boston Bruins finished fourth with 36 points. This was the fourth playoff meeting between these two teams with Detroit winning two of the three previous series. They last met in the 1943 Stanley Cup Finals where the Red Wings won in four games. Detroit won this season's ten-game regular-season series earning nineteen of twenty points.

March 20	Boston Bruins	4–3	Detroit Red Wings	Olympia Stadium	Recap
Bill Cowley (1) – 06:20; Bill Cupolo (1) – 10:07; Herb Cain (1) – 14:04		First period	No scoring
No scoring		Second period	No scoring
Jack McGill (1) – 07:22		Third period	04:04 – Earl Seibert (1); 09:05 – Joe Carveth (1); 19:04 – Eddie Bruneteau (1)
Paul Bibeault		Goalie stats	Harry Lumley

March 22	Boston Bruins	4–2	Detroit Red Wings	Olympia Stadium	Recap
Jack McGill (2) – 02:46		First period	No scoring
Ken Smith (1) – 10:03; Jean-Paul Gladu (1) – 10:18		Second period	08:25 – Harold Jackson (1)
Pat Egan (1) – 17:05		Third period	12:48 – Eddie Bruneteau (2)
Paul Bibeault		Goalie stats	Harry Lumley

March 24	Detroit Red Wings	3–2	Boston Bruins	Boston Garden	Recap
Ted Lindsay (1) – 18:54; Murray Armstrong (1) – 19:35		First period	No scoring
No scoring		Second period	16:05 – Pat Egan (2)
Mud Bruneteau (1) – 15:48		Third period	17:57 – Gino Rozzini (1)
Harry Lumley		Goalie stats	Paul Bibeault

March 27	Detroit Red Wings	3–2	Boston Bruins	Boston Garden	Recap
Earl Seibert (2) – 17:21		First period	08:31 – Ken Smith (2)
No scoring		Second period	14:38 – Herb Cain (2)
Joe Carveth (2) – 05:10; Murray Armstrong (2) – 17:15		Third period	No scoring
Harry Lumley		Goalie stats	Paul Bibeault

March 29	Boston Bruins	2–3	OT	Detroit Red Wings	Olympia Stadium	Recap
Herb Cain (3) – 11:52		First period		02:51 – Mud Bruneteau (2); 11:41 – Flash Hollett (1)
No scoring		Second period		No scoring
Bill Jennings (1) – pp – 17:00		Third period		No scoring
No scoring		First overtime period		17:12 – Mud Bruneteau (3)
Paul Bibeault		Goalie stats		Harry Lumley

April 1	Detroit Red Wings	3–5	Boston Bruins	Boston Garden	Recap
Jud McAtee (1) – 00:45		First period	12:54 – Bill Cowley (2)
Joe Carveth (3) – 03:24; Jud McAtee (2) – 17:12		Second period	06:24 – Bill Jennings (2); 07:33 – pp – Herb Cain (4); 10:38 – Jean-Paul Gladu (2)
No scoring		Third period	09:25 – Bill Cowley (3)
Harry Lumley		Goalie stats	Paul Bibeault

April 3	Boston Bruins	3–5	Detroit Red Wings	Olympia Stadium	Recap
Jack McGill (3) – 19:15		First period	08:20 – pp – Carl Liscombe (1)
Herb Cain (5) – 08:50; Ken Smith (3) – 19:39		Second period	03:51 – Carl Liscombe (2)
No scoring		Third period	02:01 – Eddie Bruneteau (3); 04:09 – Carl Liscombe (3); 19:54 – Carl Liscombe (4)
Paul Bibeault		Goalie stats	Harry Lumley

Detroit won series 4–3

=== Stanley Cup Finals ===
This was the eighth playoff meeting between these two teams with Toronto winning four of the seven previous series. They last met in the 1943 Stanley Cup Semifinals where Detroit won in six games. Detroit won this season's ten-game regular-season series earning seventeen of twenty points.

April 6	Toronto Maple Leafs	1–0	Detroit Red Wings	Olympia Stadium	Recap
Sweeney Schriner (3) – 13:56		First period	No scoring
No scoring		Second period	No scoring
No scoring		Third period	No scoring
Frank McCool		Goalie stats	Harry Lumley

April 8	Toronto Maple Leafs	2–0	Detroit Red Wings	Olympia Stadium	Recap
No scoring		First period	No scoring
Ted Kennedy (4) – 13:05		Second period	No scoring
Moe Morris (3) – 12:03		Third period	No scoring
Frank McCool		Goalie stats	Harry Lumley

April 12	Detroit Red Wings	0–1	Toronto Maple Leafs	Maple Leaf Gardens	Recap
No scoring		First period	No scoring
No scoring		Second period	No scoring
No scoring		Third period	03:02 – Gus Bodnar (3)
Harry Lumley		Goalie stats	Frank McCool

April 14	Detroit Red Wings	5–3	Toronto Maple Leafs	Maple Leaf Gardens	Recap
Flash Hollett (2) – pp – 08:35		First period	09:19 – Ted Kennedy (5); 11:44 – pp – Ted Kennedy (6)
Murray Armstrong (3) – 09:20		Second period	10:20 – Ted Kennedy (7)
Eddie Bruneteau (4) – sh – 01:11; Ted Lindsay (2) – 03:20; Joe Carveth (4) – 17:38		Third period	No scoring
Harry Lumley		Goalie stats	Frank McCool

April 19	Toronto Maple Leafs	0–2	Detroit Red Wings	Olympia Stadium	Recap
No scoring		First period	No scoring
No scoring		Second period	No scoring
No scoring		Third period	08:21 – Flash Hollett (3); 16:16 – Joe Carveth (5)
Frank McCool		Goalie stats	Harry Lumley

April 21	Detroit Red Wings	1–0	OT	Toronto Maple Leafs	Maple Leaf Gardens	Recap
No scoring		First period		No scoring
No scoring		Second period		No scoring
No scoring		Third period		No scoring
Eddie Bruneteau (5) – 14:16		First overtime period		No scoring
Harry Lumley		Goalie stats		Frank McCool

April 22	Toronto Maple Leafs	2–1	Detroit Red Wings	Olympia Stadium	Recap
Mel Hill (2) – 05:38		First period	No scoring
No scoring		Second period	No scoring
Babe Pratt (2) – pp – 12:14		Third period	08:16 – Murray Armstrong (4)
Frank McCool		Goalie stats	Harry Lumley

Toronto won series 4–3

== Awards ==
Award winners
O'Brien Cup: (Stanley Cup runner-up)	Detroit Red Wings
Prince of Wales Trophy: (Regular season champion)	Montreal Canadiens
Calder Memorial Trophy: (Best first-year player)	Frank McCool, Toronto Maple Leafs
Hart Trophy: (Most valuable player)	Elmer Lach, Montreal Canadiens
Lady Byng Trophy: (Excellence and sportsmanship)	Bill Mosienko, Chicago Black Hawks
Vezina Trophy: (Fewest goals allowed)	Bill Durnan, Montreal Canadiens

All-Star teams
First team	Position	Second team
Bill Durnan, Montreal Canadiens	G	Mike Karakas, Chicago Black Hawks
Emile Bouchard, Montreal Canadiens	D	Glen Harmon, Montreal Canadiens
Flash Hollett, Detroit Red Wings	D	Babe Pratt, Toronto Maple Leafs
Elmer Lach, Montreal Canadiens	C	Bill Cowley, Boston Bruins
Maurice Richard, Montreal Canadiens	RW	Bill Mosienko, Chicago Black Hawks
Toe Blake, Montreal Canadiens	LW	Syd Howe, Detroit Red Wings
Dick Irvin, Montreal Canadiens	Coach	Jack Adams, Detroit Red Wings

== Player statistics ==
=== Scoring leaders ===
Note: GP = Games played, G = Goals, A = Assists, PTS = Points, PIM = Penalties in minutes

Player	Team	GP	G	A	Pts	PIM
Elmer Lach	Montreal Canadiens	50	26	54	80	37
Maurice Richard	Montreal Canadiens	50	50	23	73	46
Toe Blake	Montreal Canadiens	49	29	38	67	35
Bill Cowley	Boston Bruins	49	25	40	65	12
Ted Kennedy	Toronto Maple Leafs	49	29	25	54	14
Bill Mosienko	Chicago Black Hawks	50	28	26	54	0
Joe Carveth	Detroit Red Wings	50	26	28	54	6
Ab DeMarco	New York Rangers	50	24	30	54	10
Clint Smith	Chicago Black Hawks	50	23	31	54	0
Syd Howe	Detroit Red Wings	46	17	36	53	6

Source: NHL

=== Leading goaltenders ===
Note: GP = Games played; Min – Minutes played; GA = Goals against; GAA = Goals against average; W = Wins; L = Losses; T = Ties; SO = Shutouts

Player	Team	GP	MIN	GA	GAA	W	L	T	SO
Bill Durnan	Montreal Canadiens	50	3000	121	2.42	38	8	4	1
Frank McCool	Toronto Maple Leafs	50	3000	161	3.22	24	22	4	4
Harry Lumley	Detroit Red Wings	37	2220	119	3.22	24	10	3	1
Connie Dion	Detroit Red Wings	12	720	39	3.25	6	4	2	0
Mike Karakas	Chicago Black Hawks	48	2880	187	3.90	12	29	7	4
Harvey Bennett	Boston Bruins	24	1470	103	4.20	10	12	2	0
Paul Bibeault	Boston Bruins	26	1530	116	4.55	6	18	2	0
Ken McAuley	New York Rangers	46	2760	227	4.93	11	25	10	1

== Coaches ==
- Boston Bruins: Art Ross
- Chicago Black Hawks: Johnny Gottselig
- Detroit Red Wings: Jack Adams
- Montreal Canadiens: Dick Irvin
- New York Rangers: Frank Boucher
- Toronto Maple Leafs: Hap Day

== Debuts ==
The following is a list of players of note who played their first NHL game in 1944–45 (listed with their first team, asterisk(*) marks debut in playoffs):

- Fern Flaman, Boston Bruins
- Murray Henderson, Boston Bruins
- Pete Horeck, Chicago Black Hawks
- Ted Lindsay, Detroit Red Wings
- Bill Ezinicki, Toronto Maple Leafs
- Frank McCool, Toronto Maple Leafs

== Last games ==
The following is a list of players of note that played their last game in the NHL in 1944–45 (listed with their last team):

- Bill Thoms, Boston Bruins
- Cully Dahlstrom, Chicago Black Hawks
- Mush March, Chicago Black Hawks
- Johnny Gottselig, Chicago Black Hawks
- Kilby MacDonald, New York Rangers
- Bucko McDonald, New York Rangers
- Jack McLean, Toronto Maple Leafs
- John McCreedy, Toronto Maple Leafs

== See also ==
- 1944–45 NHL transactions
- List of Stanley Cup champions
- 1944 in sports
- 1945 in sports
