= 1949 Allan Cup =

Canadian senior ice hockey championship

The Allan Cup was the championship trophy for amateur senior ice hockey overseen by the CAHA.

The 1949 Allan Cup was the senior ice hockey championship of the Canadian Amateur Hockey Association (CAHA) for the 1948–49 season.

== Final ==
Best of 7

- Ottawa 6 Regina 4
- Ottawa 3 Regina 1
- Ottawa 7 Regina 0
- Regina 6 Ottawa 3
- Ottawa 5 Regina 3

Ottawa Senators beat Regina Capitals 4–1 on series. W. B. George presented the Allan Cup trophy to the Senators who won the first senior championship title by an Ottawa team in 41 years.
