= List of NHL players who spent their entire career with one franchise =

The following is a list of retired National Hockey League (NHL) players who played their entire NHL career—in at least ten seasons—exclusively for one team. As of the end of the 2025–26 season, 128 players have accomplished this feat, of which the Montreal Canadiens have had the most, with 19. Of players who have spent their career with one franchise, Alex Delvecchio of the Detroit Red Wings holds the record of the greatest number of seasons, with 24. Delvecchio beat out former Detroit Red Wings teammate Gordie Howe for the record in the 1979–80 season when Howe’s World Hockey Association team, the Hartford Whalers, became an NHL team, thus disqualifying Howe from this one franchise list. Howe broke the old record in the 1966–67 NHL season by beating out Dit Clapper who spent 20 seasons with the Boston Bruins. Howe held the record for 13 seasons, extending the old record to 25 seasons until he played in the NHL with Hartford.

== List ==
Key

*	Member of the Hockey Hall of Fame
#	Not yet eligible for Hockey Hall of Fame consideration

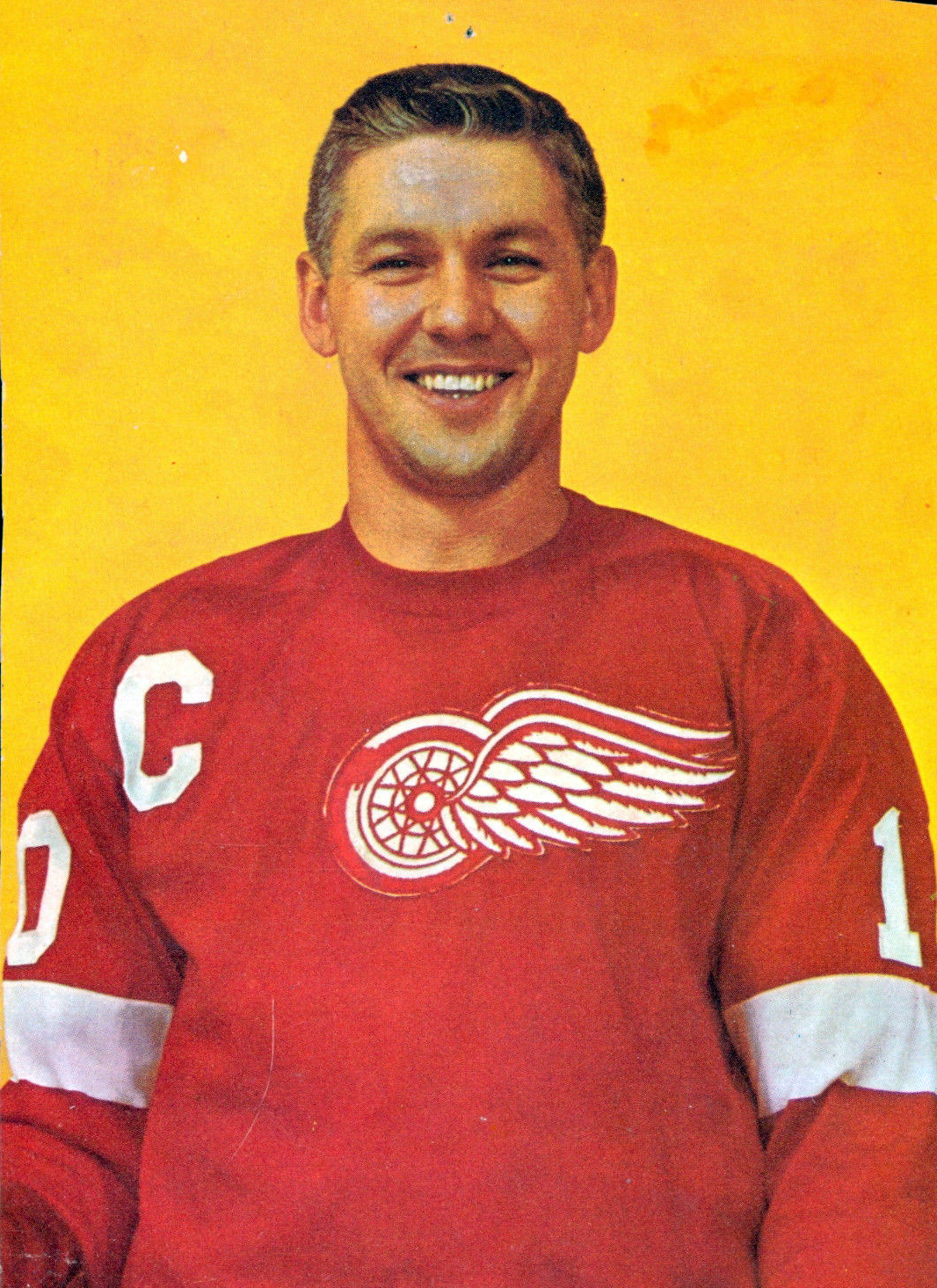
Alex Delvecchio, 24 seasons with Detroit

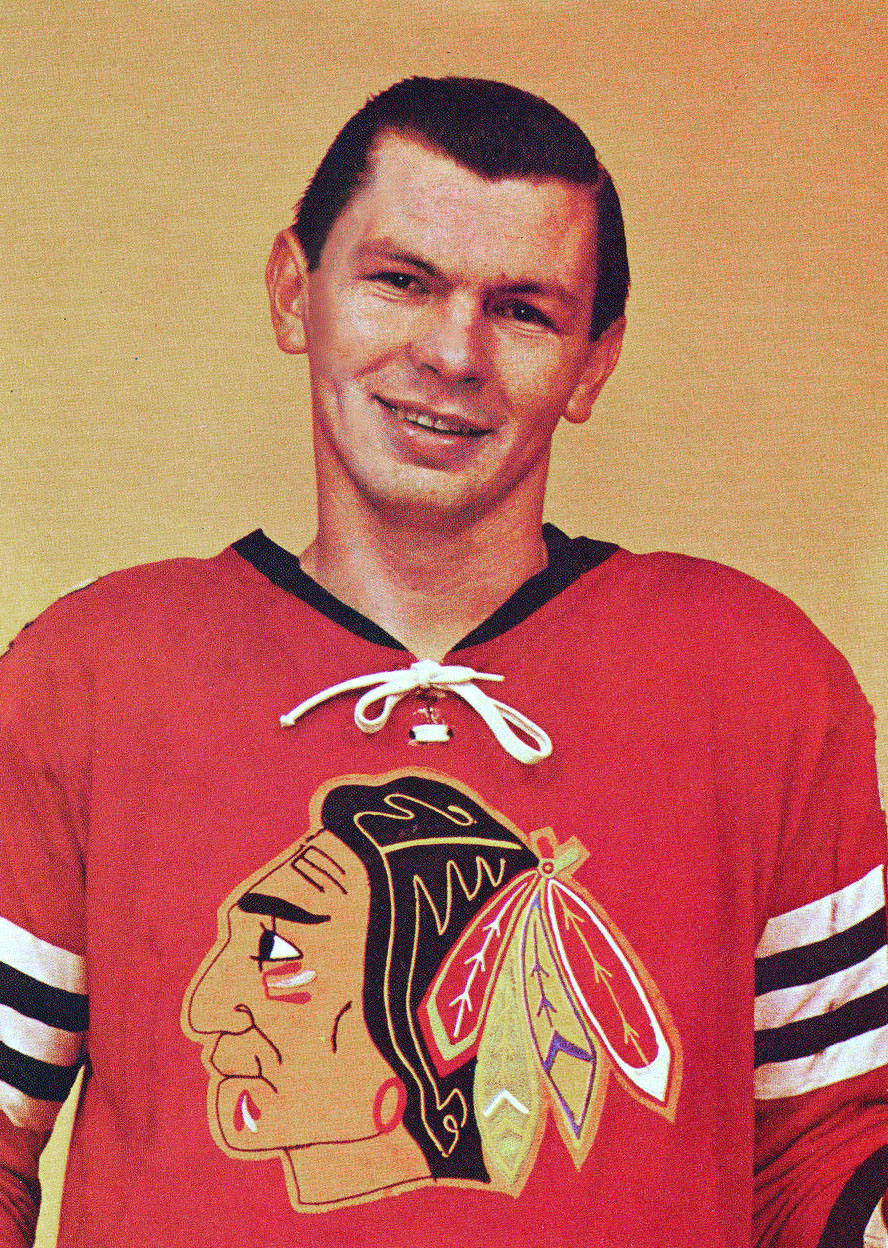
Stan Mikita, 22 seasons with Chicago

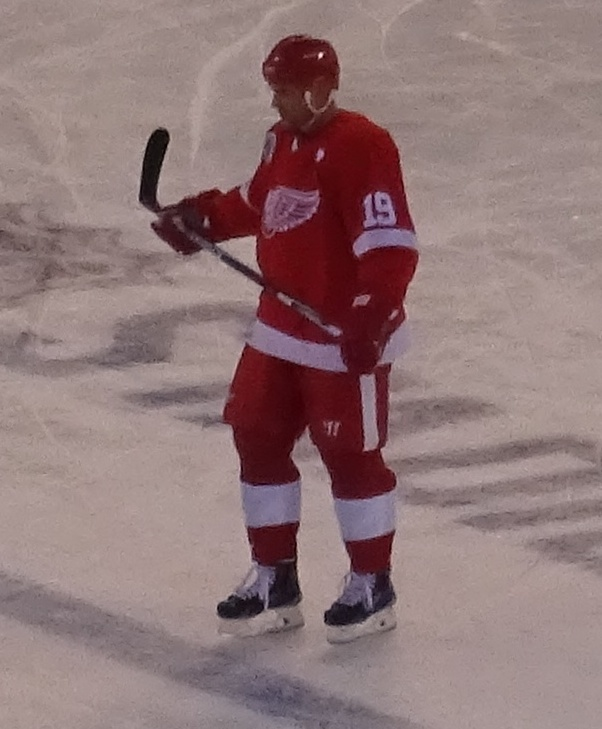
Steve Yzerman, 22 seasons with Detroit

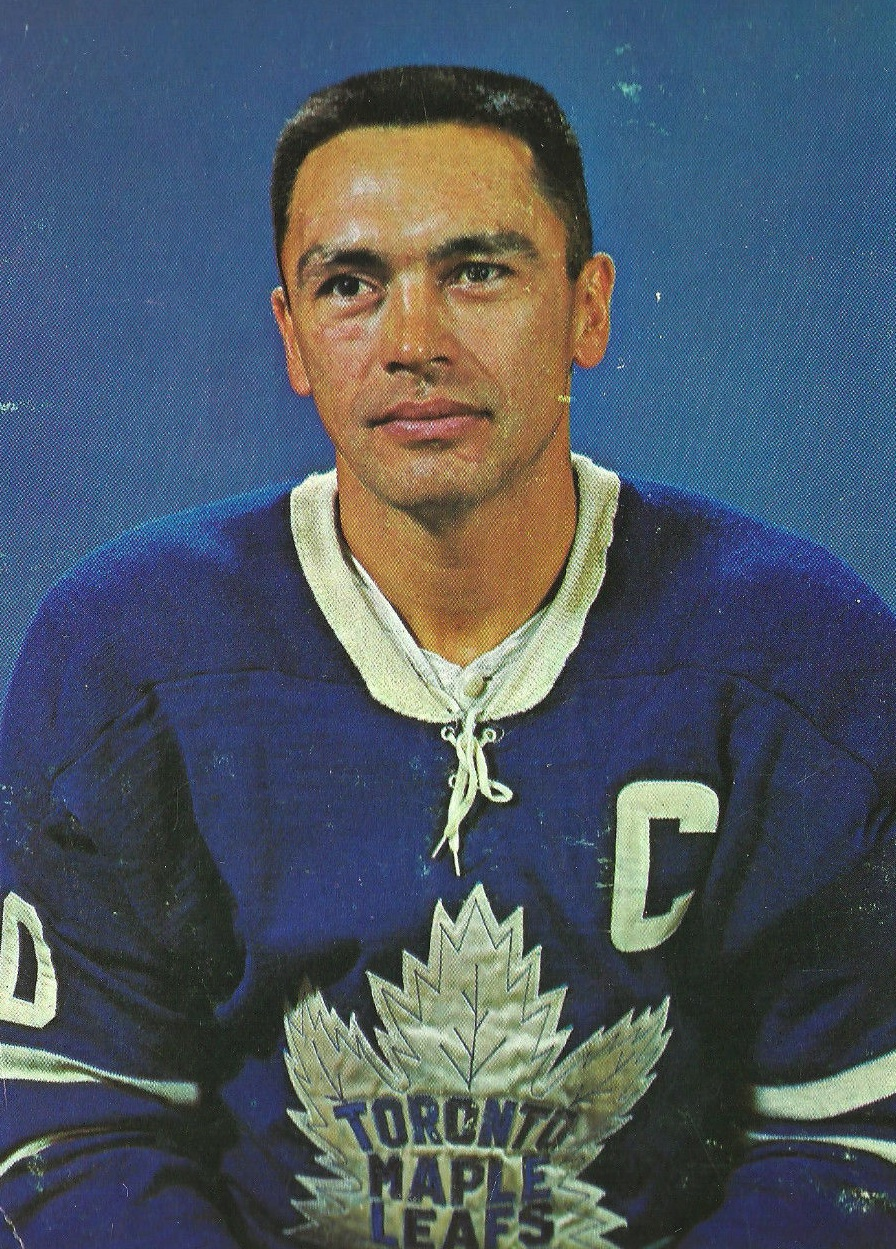
George Armstrong, 21 seasons with Toronto

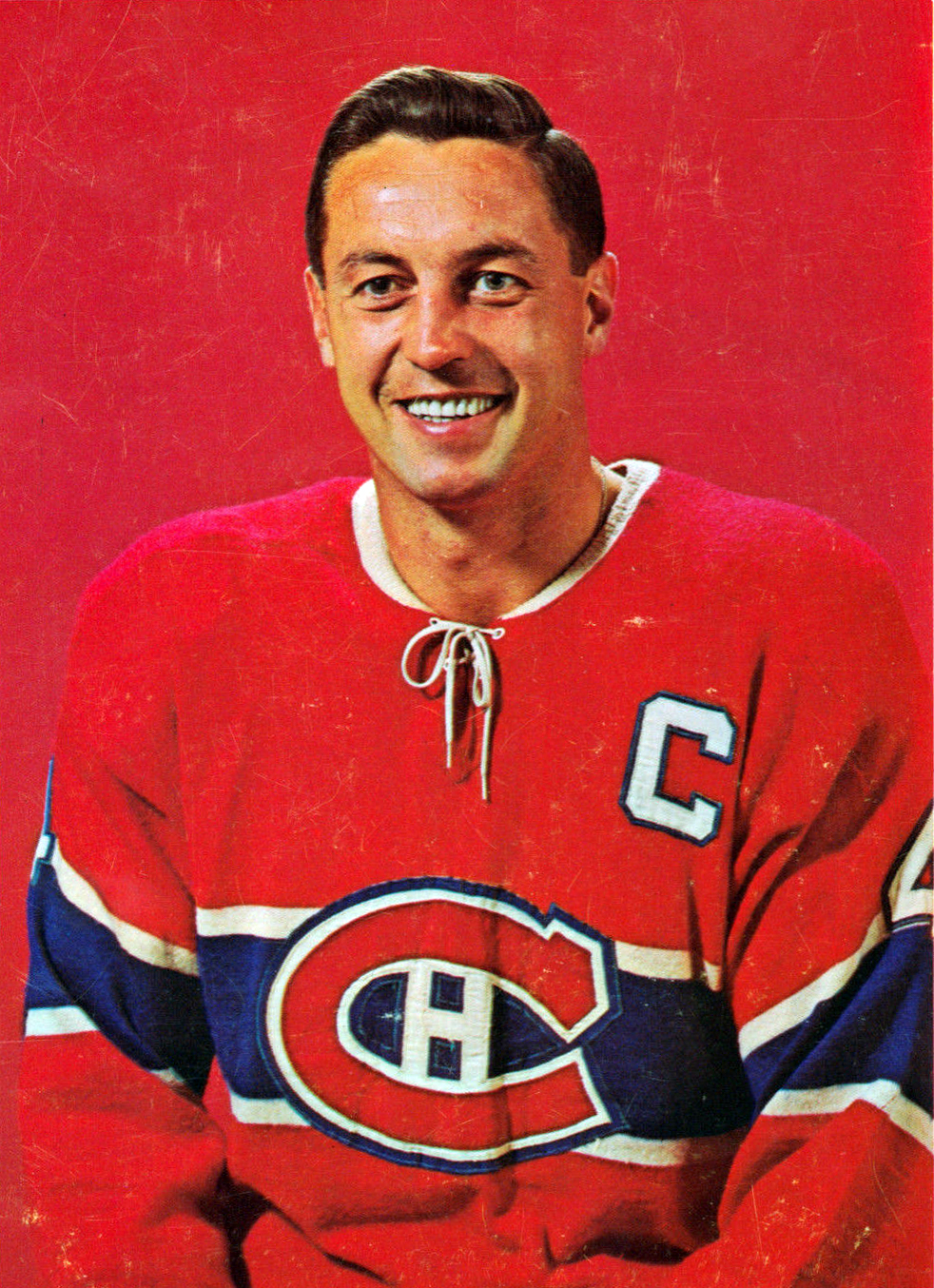
Jean Béliveau, 20 seasons with Montreal

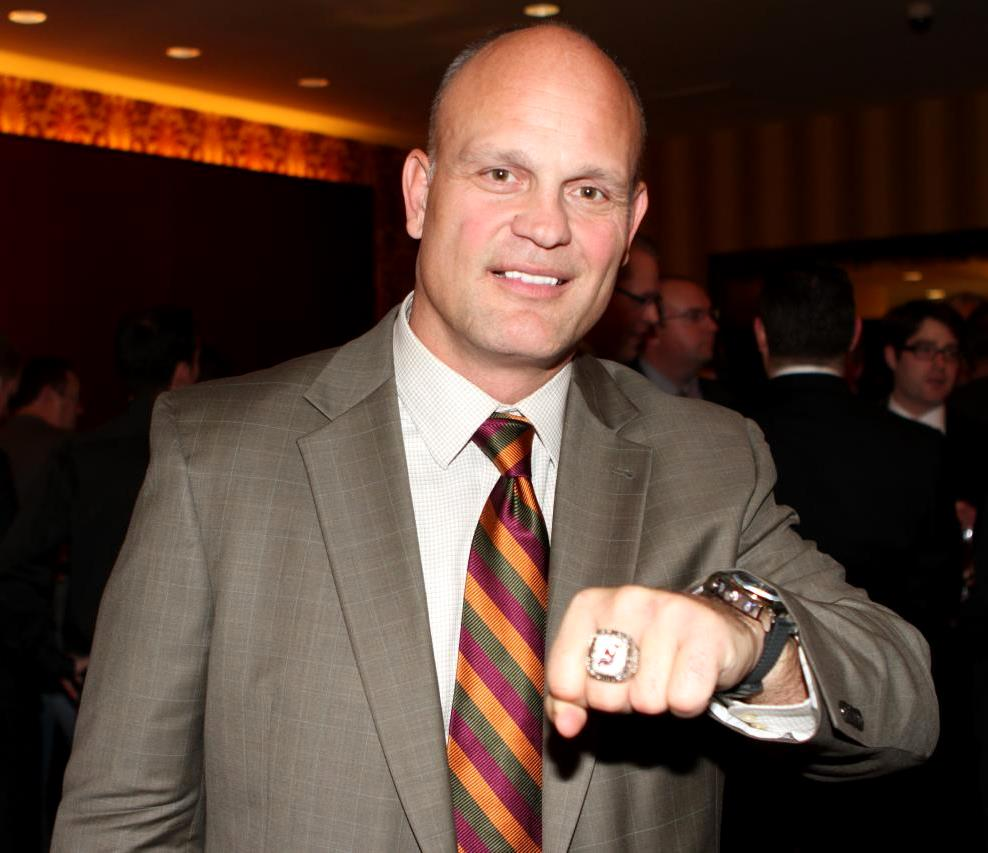
Ken Daneyko, 20 seasons with New Jersey

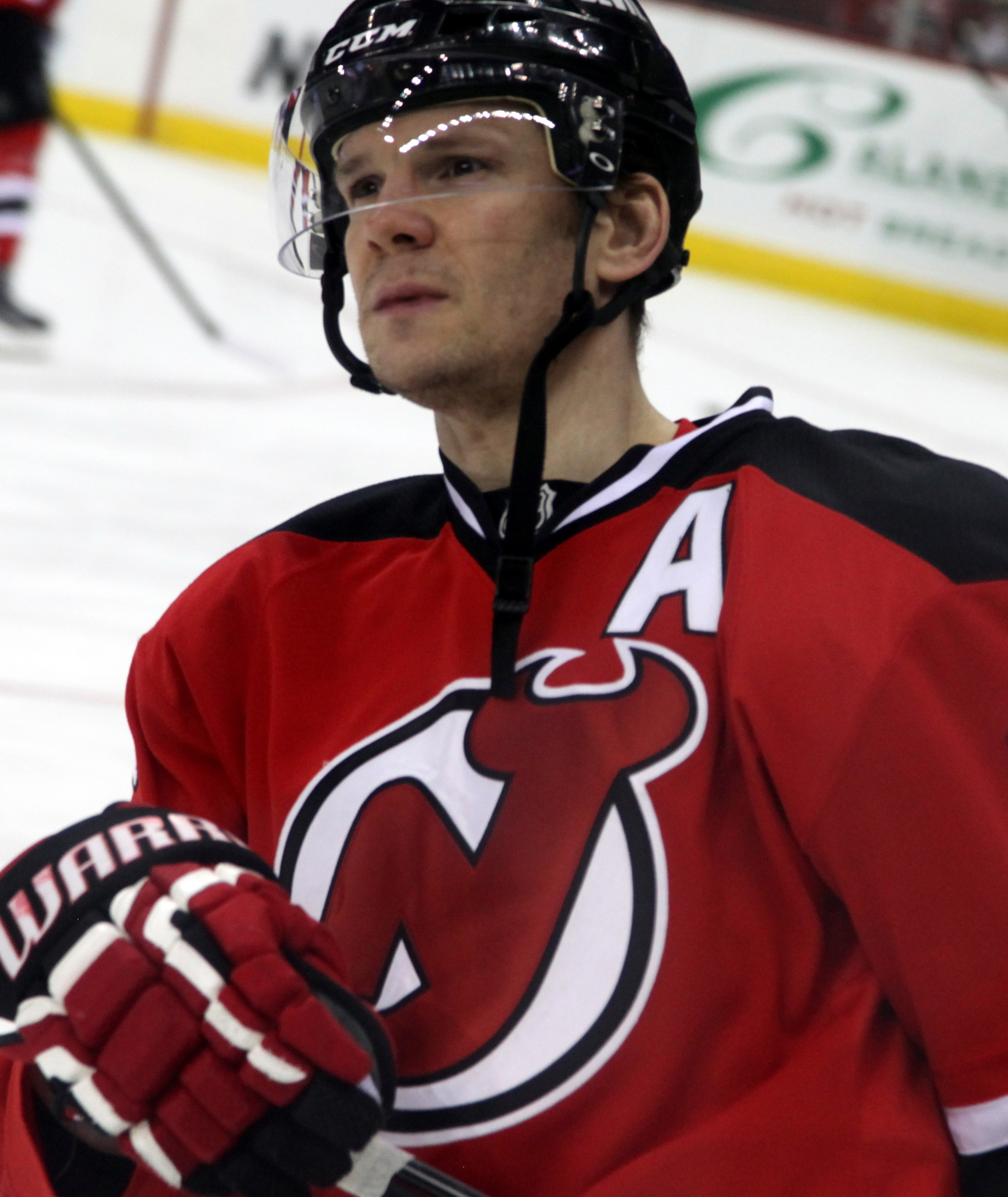
Patrik Eliáš, 20 seasons with New Jersey

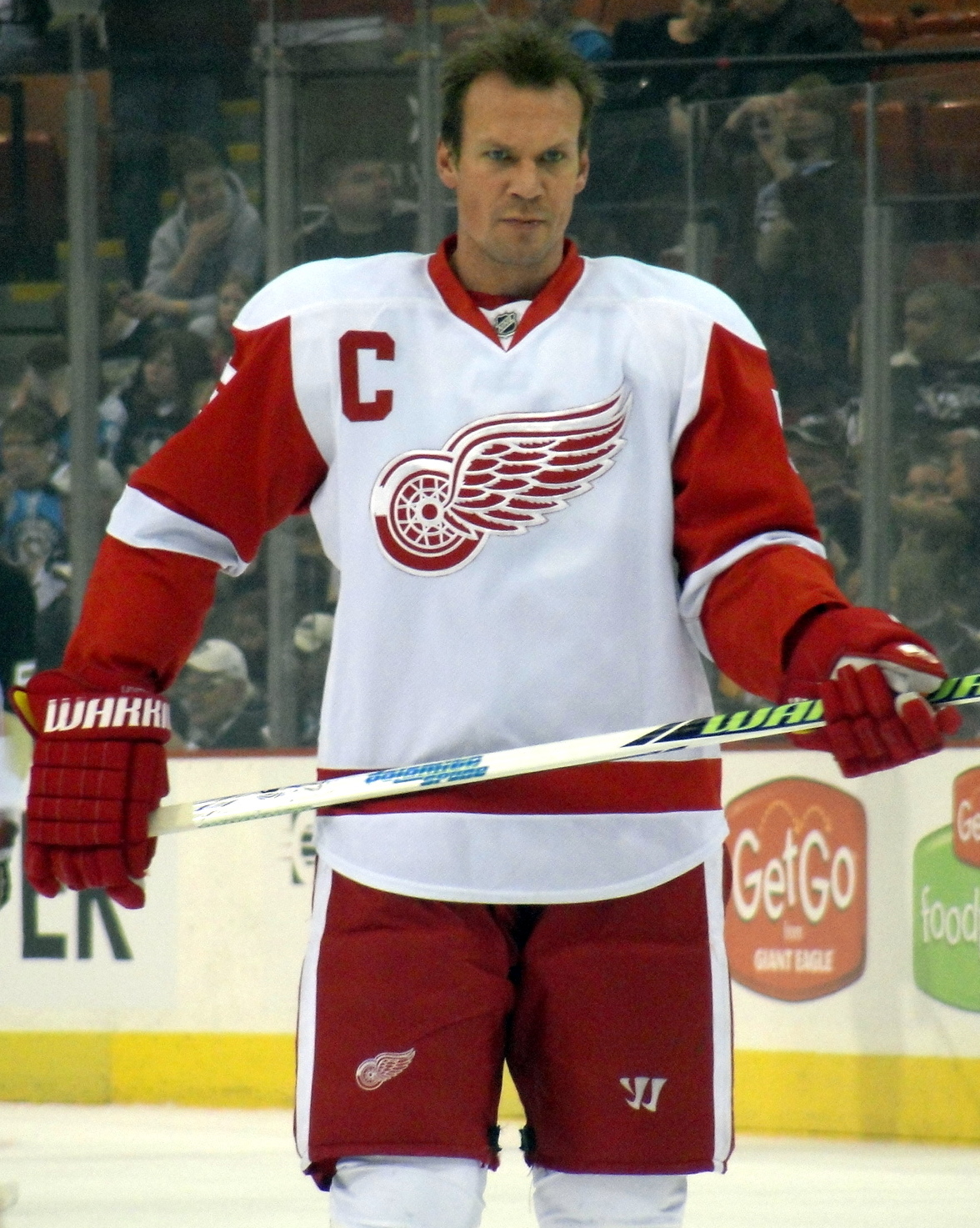
Nicklas Lidström, 20 seasons with Detroit

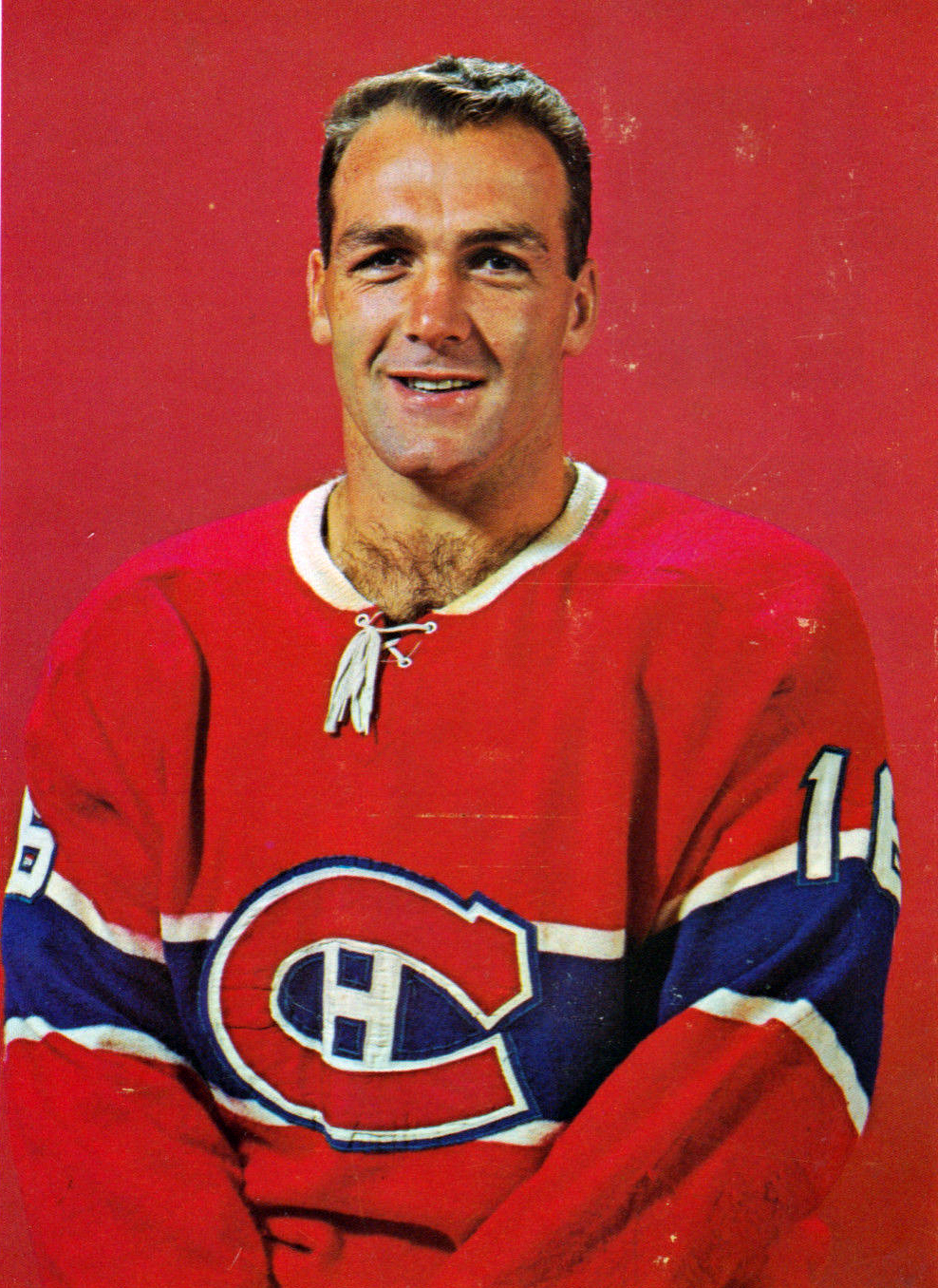
Henri Richard, 20 seasons with Montreal

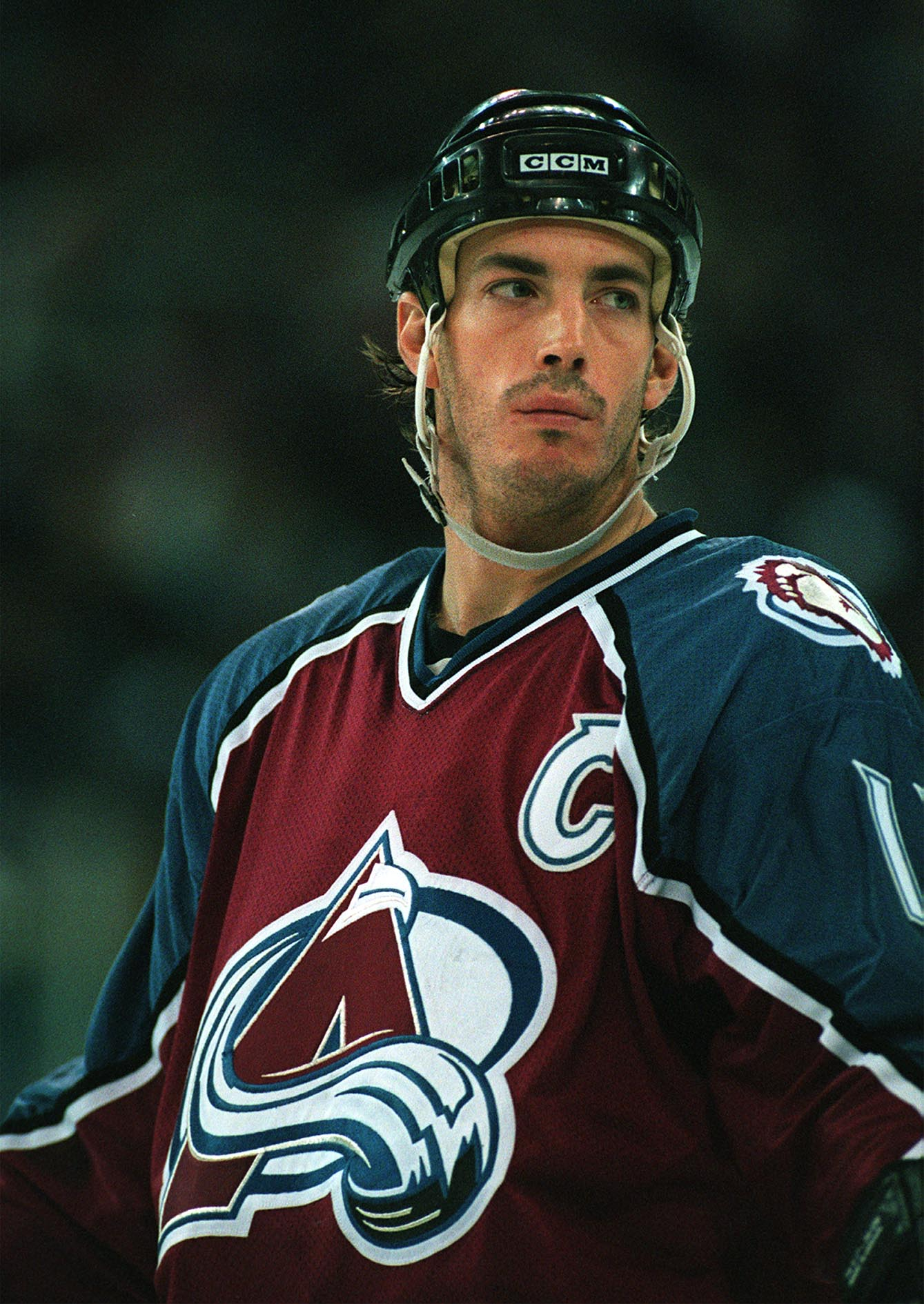
Joe Sakic, 20 seasons with Quebec/Colorado

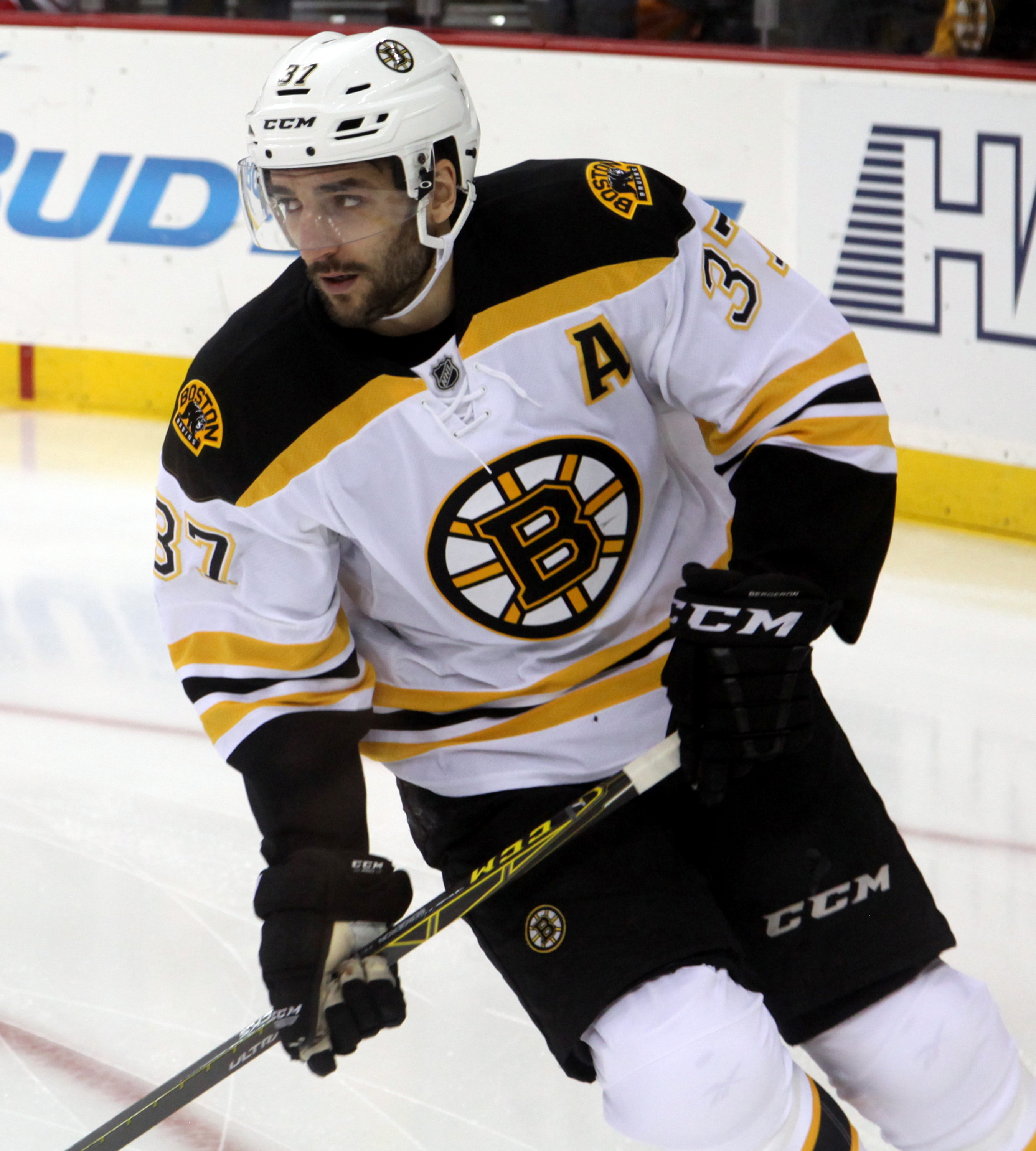
Patrice Bergeron, 19 seasons with Boston

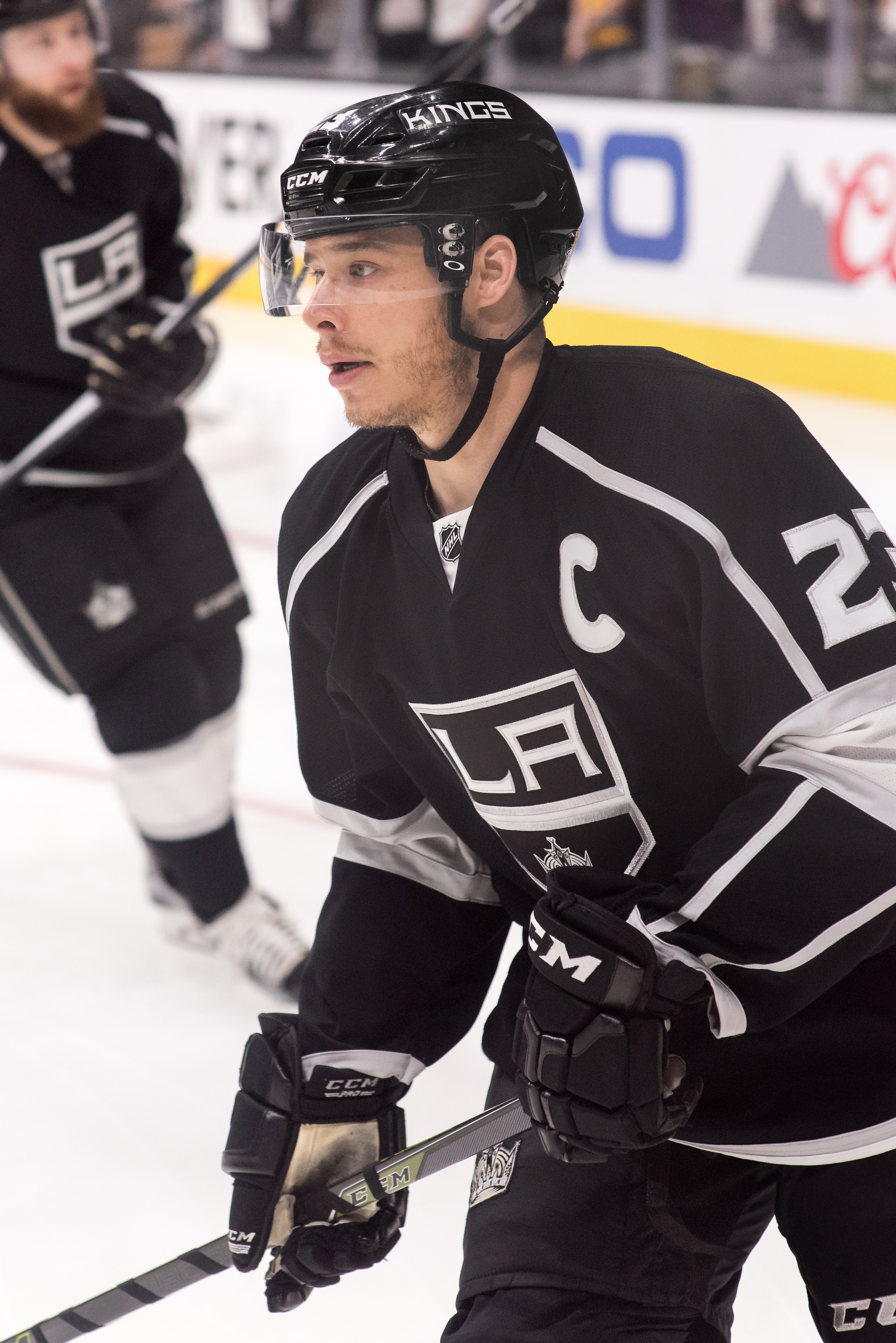
Dustin Brown, 18 seasons with Los Angeles

NHL players who have spent their career with one franchise
Seasons	Player	Team	Career	Games played	Cup wins
13	Justin Abdelkader	Detroit Red Wings	2007–2020	739	0
10	Syl Apps*	Toronto Maple Leafs	1936–1943, 1945–1948	423	3
11	Bob Armstrong	Boston Bruins	1950–1951, 1952–1962	542	0
21	George Armstrong*	Toronto Maple Leafs	1949–1971	1,188	4
12	Larry Aurie	Detroit Cougars/Falcons/Red Wings	1927–1939	489	2
11	P. J. Axelsson	Boston Bruins	1997–2004, 2005–2009	797	0
15	Josh Bailey	New York Islanders	2008–2023	1,057	0
12	Bill Barber*	Philadelphia Flyers	1972–1984	903	2
20	Jean Béliveau*	Montreal Canadiens	1950–1951, 1952–1971	1,125	10
19	Patrice Bergeron#	Boston Bruins	2003–2004, 2005–2023	1,294	1
10	Mike Bossy*	New York Islanders	1977–1987	752	4
15	Butch Bouchard*	Montreal Canadiens	1941–1956	785	4
14	Turk Broda*	Toronto Maple Leafs	1936–1943, 1945–1952	629	5
18	Dustin Brown#	Los Angeles Kings	2003–2004, 2005–2022	1,296	2
11	Mud Bruneteau	Detroit Red Wings	1935–1946	411	3
13	Sergei Brylin	New Jersey Devils	1994–2004, 2005–2008	765	3
17	Wayne Cashman	Boston Bruins	1964–1965, 1967–1983	1,027	2
20	Dit Clapper*	Boston Bruins	1927–1947	833	3
15	Bobby Clarke*	Philadelphia Flyers	1969–1984	1,144	2
12	Neil Colville*	New York Rangers	1935–1942, 1944–1949	464	1
11	Bill Cook*	New York Rangers	1926–1937	474	2
10	Alain Côté	Quebec Nordiques	1979–1989	696	0
16	Yvan Cournoyer*	Montreal Canadiens	1963–1979	968	10
15	Logan Couture#	San Jose Sharks	2009–2024	933	0
14	Corey Crawford	Chicago Blackhawks	2005–2006, 2007–2020	488	2
13	Jack Crawford	Boston Bruins	1937–1950	548	2
10	Floyd Curry	Montreal Canadiens	1947–1958	601	4
20	Ken Daneyko	New Jersey Devils	1983–2003	1,283	3
14	Pavel Datsyuk*	Detroit Red Wings	2001–2004, 2005–2016	953	2
12	Bob Davidson	Toronto Maple Leafs	1934–1946	491	2
11	Éric Dazé	Chicago Blackhawks	1994–2004, 2005–2006	601	0
24	Alex Delvecchio*	Detroit Red Wings	1950–1974	1,549	3
11	Rick DiPietro	New York Islanders	2000–2001, 2002–2004, 2005–2013	318	0
16	Woody Dumart*	Boston Bruins	1935–1942, 1945–1954	772	2
20	Patrik Eliáš	New Jersey Devils	1995–2004, 2005–2016	1,240	2
16	Ron Ellis	Toronto Maple Leafs	1963–1975, 1977–1981	1,034	1
11	Tobias Enström	Atlanta Thrashers/Winnipeg Jets	2007–2018	719	0
13	Jonathan Ericsson	Detroit Red Wings	2007–2020	680	1
10	Jan Erixon	New York Rangers	1983–1993	556	0
16	Bob Gainey*	Montreal Canadiens	1973–1989	1,160	5
17	Ryan Getzlaf#	Mighty Ducks of Anaheim/Anaheim Ducks	2005–2022	1,157	1
18	Rod Gilbert*	New York Rangers	1960–1978	1,065	0
14	Ebbie Goodfellow*	Detroit Cougars/Falcons/Red Wings	1929–1943	554	3
16	Johnny Gottselig	Chicago Black Hawks	1928–1941, 1942–1945	589	2
11	Ted Green	Boston Bruins	1960–1969, 1970–1972	620	1
16	Ron Greschner	New York Rangers	1974–1990	981	0
14	Bill Hajt	Buffalo Sabres	1973–1987	854	0
10	Craig Hartsburg	Minnesota North Stars	1979–1989	570	0
14	Milan Hejduk	Colorado Avalanche	1998–2004, 2005–2013	1,020	1
15	Ott Heller	New York Rangers	1931–1946	647	2
11	Bryan Hextall*	New York Rangers	1936–1944, 1945–1948	449	1
15	Tomas Holmström	Detroit Red Wings	1996–2004, 2005–2012	1,026	4
12	Red Horner*	Toronto Maple Leafs	1928–1940	490	1
11	Réjean Houle	Montreal Canadiens	1969–1973, 1976–1983	635	5
14	Jimmy Howard	Detroit Red Wings	2005–2006, 2007–2020	543	0
16	Aurèle Joliat*	Montreal Canadiens	1922–1938	655	3
10	Dennis Kearns	Vancouver Canucks	1971–1981	677	0
14	Ted Kennedy*	Toronto Maple Leafs	1942–1955, 1956–1957	696	5
20	Anže Kopitar#	Los Angeles Kings	2006–2026	1,521	2
11	Cliff Koroll	Chicago Black Hawks	1969–1980	814	0
16	David Krejčí#	Boston Bruins	2006–2021, 2022–2023	1,032	1
15	Niklas Kronwall	Detroit Red Wings	2003–2004, 2005–2019	953	1
14	Elmer Lach*	Montreal Canadiens	1940–1954	664	3
12	Jacques Laperrière*	Montreal Canadiens	1962–1974	691	6
10	Edgar Laprade*	New York Rangers	1945–1955	500	0
14	Jere Lehtinen	Dallas Stars	1995–2004, 2005–2010	875	1
12	Jacques Lemaire*	Montreal Canadiens	1967–1979	853	8
17	Mario Lemieux*	Pittsburgh Penguins	1984–1994, 1995–1997, 2000–2004, 2005–2006	915	2
13	Pit Lépine	Montreal Canadiens	1925–1938	526	2
11	Herbie Lewis*	Detroit Cougars/Falcons/Red Wings	1928–1939	483	2
20	Nicklas Lidström*	Detroit Red Wings	1991–2004, 2005–2012	1,564	4
13	Bryan Little	Atlanta Thrashers/Winnipeg Jets	2007–2020	843	0
15	Henrik Lundqvist*	New York Rangers	2005–2020	887	0
11	Keith Magnuson	Chicago Black Hawks	1969–1980	589	0
14	Chico Maki	Chicago Black Hawks	1961–1974, 1975–1976	841	1
13	Georges Mantha	Montreal Canadiens	1928–1941	498	2
17	Mush March	Chicago Black Hawks	1928–1945	759	2
15	Don Marcotte	Boston Bruins	1965–1966, 1968–1982	868	2
16	Andrei Markov	Montreal Canadiens	2000–2004, 2005–2017	990	0
10	John Marks	Chicago Black Hawks	1972–1982	657	0
12	Nick Metz	Toronto Maple Leafs	1934–1942, 1944–1948	518	4
10	Rudy Migay	Toronto Maple Leafs	1949–1950, 1951–1960	417	0
22	Stan Mikita*	Chicago Black Hawks	1958–1980	1,396	1
12	Mike Milbury	Boston Bruins	1975–1987	754	0
12	Armand Mondou	Montreal Canadiens	1928–1940	386	2
10	Ken Morrow	New York Islanders	1979–1989	550	4
14	Bill Mosienko*	Chicago Black Hawks	1941–1955	710	0
11	Murray Murdoch	New York Rangers	1926–1937	508	2
15	Bob Murray	Chicago Blackhawks	1975–1990	1,008	0
11	Lou Nanne	Minnesota North Stars	1967–1978	635	0
15	Chris Neil	Ottawa Senators	2001–2004, 2005–2017	1,026	0
14	Bob Nystrom	New York Islanders	1972–1986	900	4
14	Terry O'Reilly	Boston Bruins	1971–1985	891	0
10	Lynn Patrick*	New York Rangers	1934–1943, 1945–1946	455	1
10	Marty Pavelich	Detroit Red Wings	1947–1957	634	4
10	Steve Payne	Minnesota North Stars	1978–1988	613	0
11	Johnny Peirson	Boston Bruins	1946–1954, 1955–1958	545	0
11	Jim Peplinski	Calgary Flames	1980–1990, 1994–1995	711	1
17	Gilbert Perreault*	Buffalo Sabres	1970–1987	1,191	0
17	Chris Phillips	Ottawa Senators	1997–2004, 2005–2015	1,179	0
13	Michal Pivoňka	Washington Capitals	1986–1999	825	0
10	Barclay Plager	St. Louis Blues	1967–1977	614	0
15	Denis Potvin*	New York Islanders	1973–1988	1,060	4
15	Carey Price*	Montreal Canadiens	2007–2022	712	0
15	Claude Provost	Montreal Canadiens	1955–1970	1,005	9
10	Don Raleigh	New York Rangers	1943–1944, 1947–1956	535	0
14	Craig Ramsay	Buffalo Sabres	1971–1985	1,070	0
15	Tuukka Rask#	Boston Bruins	2007–2022	564	1
20	Henri Richard*	Montreal Canadiens	1955–1975	1,258	11
18	Maurice Richard*	Montreal Canadiens	1942–1960	978	8
14	Mike Richter	New York Rangers	1989–2003	666	1
15	Pekka Rinne	Nashville Predators	2005–2006, 2007–2021	683	0
20	Joe Sakic*	Quebec Nordiques/Colorado Avalanche	1988–2004, 2005–2009	1,378	2
16	Milt Schmidt*	Boston Bruins	1936–1942, 1945–1955	776	2
15	Brent Seabrook	Chicago Blackhawks	2005–2020	1,114	3
17	Daniel Sedin	Vancouver Canucks	2000–2004, 2005–2018	1,306	0
17	Henrik Sedin	Vancouver Canucks	2000–2004, 2005–2018	1,330	0
10	Jim Slater	Atlanta Thrashers/Winnipeg Jets	2005–2015	584	0
12	Sid Smith	Toronto Maple Leafs	1946–1958	601	3
13	Stan Smyl	Vancouver Canucks	1978–1991	896	0
14	Thomas Steen	Winnipeg Jets	1981–1995	950	0
12	Brian Sutter	St. Louis Blues	1976–1988	779	0
17	Dave Taylor	Los Angeles Kings	1977–1994	1,111	0
14	Walt Tkaczuk	New York Rangers	1967–1981	945	0
13	J. C. Tremblay	Montreal Canadiens	1959–1972	794	5
12	Mario Tremblay	Montreal Canadiens	1974–1986	852	5
10	Steve Vickers	New York Rangers	1972–1982	698	0
10	Jimmy Watson	Philadelphia Flyers	1972–1982	613	2
14	Kenny Wharram	Chicago Black Hawks	1951–1969	766	1
11	Art Wiebe	Chicago Black Hawks	1932–1933, 1934–1944	414	1
22	Steve Yzerman*	Detroit Red Wings	1983–2004, 2005–2006	1,514	3
15	Henrik Zetterberg	Detroit Red Wings	2002–2004, 2005–2018	1,082	1

=== Honorable mentions ===
- Shane Doan played 21 seasons with the Winnipeg Jets/Phoenix/Arizona Coyotes franchise from 1995–2004, 2005–2017. However, in 2026, the Coyotes were retconned as a 1996 expansion team after the NHL consolidated the franchise records and statistics of the original Winnipeg Jets with the current Jets.
- Georges Vézina played 16 seasons for the Montreal Canadiens, from 1910 to 1925, including both the NHL and its informal predecessor, the National Hockey Association (NHA). Only counting the NHL, he appeared in 190 games across the league's first 9 seasons.

== Potential future candidates ==
The following active players have played at least ten seasons exclusively for one team to date. Table updated as of the 2026–27 season.

Seasons	Player	Team	Career
11	Sebastian Aho	Carolina Hurricanes	2016–2027
19	Mikael Backlund	Calgary Flames	2008–2027
17	Nicklas Bäckström	Washington Capitals	2007–2024
14	Aleksander Barkov	Florida Panthers	2013–2027
10	Matthew Barzal	New York Islanders	2017–2027
18	Jamie Benn	Dallas Stars	2009–2027
10	Brock Boeser	Vancouver Canucks	2017–2027
10	Jesper Bratt	New Jersey Devils	2017–2027
15	Jonas Brodin	Minnesota Wild	2012–2027
10	Thomas Chabot	Ottawa Senators	2017–2027
10	Anthony Cirelli	Tampa Bay Lightning	2017–2027
16	Casey Cizikas	New York Islanders	2011–2027
10	Kyle Connor	Winnipeg Jets	2017–2027
16	Sean Couturier	Philadelphia Flyers	2011–2027
22	Sidney Crosby	Pittsburgh Penguins	2005–2027
19	Drew Doughty	Los Angeles Kings	2008–2027
13	Leon Draisaitl	Edmonton Oilers	2014–2027
13	Aaron Ekblad	Florida Panthers	2014–2027
11	Joel Eriksson Ek	Minnesota Wild	2016–2027
15	Filip Forsberg	Nashville Predators	2012–2027
18	Victor Hedman	Tampa Bay Lightning	2009–2027
12	Connor Hellebuyck	Winnipeg Jets	2015–2027
10	Nico Hischier	New Jersey Devils	2017–2027
16	Roman Josi	Nashville Predators	2011–2027
11	Adrian Kempe	Los Angeles Kings	2016–2027
11	Travis Konecny	Philadelphia Flyers	2016–2027
14	Nikita Kucherov	Tampa Bay Lightning	2013–2027
13	Gabriel Landeskog	Colorado Avalanche	2011–2022, 2025–2027
12	Dylan Larkin	Detroit Red Wings	2015–2027
21	Kris Letang	Pittsburgh Penguins	2006–2027
12	Esa Lindell	Dallas Stars	2015–2027
13	Adam Lowry	Winnipeg Jets	2014–2027
14	Nathan MacKinnon	Colorado Avalanche	2013–2027
21	Evgeni Malkin	Pittsburgh Penguins	2006–2027
11	Auston Matthews	Toronto Maple Leafs	2016–2027
14	Scott Mayfield	New York Islanders	2013–2027
10	Charlie McAvoy	Boston Bruins	2017–2027
12	Connor McDavid	Edmonton Oilers	2015–2027
12	Josh Morrissey	Winnipeg Jets	2015–2027
16	Ryan Nugent-Hopkins	Edmonton Oilers	2011–2027
12	William Nylander	Toronto Maple Leafs	2015–2027
22	Alexander Ovechkin	Washington Capitals	2005–2027
12	Colton Parayko	St. Louis Blues	2015–2027
13	David Pastrňák	Boston Bruins	2014–2027
12	Adam Pelech	New York Islanders	2015–2027
11	Brayden Point	Tampa Bay Lightning	2016–2027
12	Ryan Pulock	New York Islanders	2015–2027
14	Morgan Rielly	Toronto Maple Leafs	2013–2027
13	Bryan Rust	Pittsburgh Penguins	2014–2027
10	Travis Sanheim	Philadelphia Flyers	2017–2027
12	Juuse Saros	Nashville Predators	2015–2027
16	Mark Scheifele	Winnipeg Jets	2011–2027
12	Jaccob Slavin	Carolina Hurricanes	2015–2027
17	Jared Spurgeon	Minnesota Wild	2010–2027
11	Zach Werenski	Columbus Blue Jackets	2016–2027
14	Tom Wilson	Washington Capitals	2013–2027
13	Andrei Vasilevskiy	Tampa Bay Lightning	2014–2027
19	Marc-Édouard Vlasic	San Jose Sharks	2006–2025

== Counts by franchise ==
Team name	Past name(s)	Player count
Anaheim Ducks	Mighty Ducks of Anaheim	1
Arizona Coyotes	Phoenix Coyotes	0
Boston Bruins		15
Buffalo Sabres		3
Calgary Flames	Atlanta Flames	1
Carolina Hurricanes	Hartford Whalers	0
Chicago Blackhawks	Chicago Black Hawks	14
Colorado Avalanche	Quebec Nordiques	3
Columbus Blue Jackets		0
Dallas Stars	Minnesota North Stars	4
Detroit Red Wings	Detroit Cougars; Detroit Falcons	15
Edmonton Oilers		0
Florida Panthers		0
Los Angeles Kings		3
Minnesota Wild		0
Montreal Canadiens		20
Nashville Predators		1
New Jersey Devils	Kansas City Scouts; Colorado Rockies	3
New York Islanders		5
New York Rangers		15
Ottawa Senators		2
Philadelphia Flyers		3
Pittsburgh Penguins		1
Seattle Kraken		0
St. Louis Blues		2
San Jose Sharks		1
Tampa Bay Lightning		0
Toronto Maple Leafs	Toronto Arenas; Toronto St. Patricks	10
Utah Mammoth	Utah Hockey Club	0
Vancouver Canucks		4
Vegas Golden Knights		0
Washington Capitals		1
Winnipeg Jets	Atlanta Thrashers	4

== See also ==
- List of one-club men in association football
- List of one-club men in rugby league
- List of Major League Baseball players who spent their entire career with one franchise
- List of NBA players who have spent their entire career with one franchise
- List of NFL players who spent their entire career with one franchise
