= Charlie Conacher Humanitarian Award =

Defunct National Hockey League player award

Charlie Conacher Memorial Trophy
- Sport: Ice hockey
- Awarded for: NHL player who makes an outstanding contribution to humanitarian or community service projects.

History
- First award: 1968–69 NHL season
- Final award: 1983–84 NHL season

The Charlie Conacher Humanitarian Award (or Charlie Conacher Memorial Trophy) was an award given to a National Hockey League (NHL) player who made "outstanding contribution to humanitarian or community service projects". It was established in 1968–69 in the memory of Hockey Hall of Fame player Charlie Conacher, who died of throat cancer in 1967, and featured an annual benefit dinner that raised money for the Charlie Conacher Research Fund for Cancer. The award was not affiliated with the NHL, though it was given to one of the league's players.

Toronto Maple Leafs captain George Armstrong was the first winner, named following the 1968–69 season. Co-winners were named on two occasions, as Jean Beliveau and Bobby Orr shared the award in 1970–71, as did Jimmy Peters, Jr. and Gary Bergman in 1972–73. Calgary Flames forward Lanny McDonald was announced as the winner of the award at the 1982–83 Conacher Hockey Awards dinner, though he was actually the runner-up to Boston Bruins defenceman Brad Park. The mistake was cleared up a few days after the dinner.

Calgary's Jim Peplinski was named the final recipient of the award in 1983–84, after which the trophy was retired and put on display at the newly constructed Charlie Conacher Research Centre for cancer at the Toronto General Hospital. Former Chicago Blackhawks star Stan Mikita was given a special award at that final banquet in recognition of his work with the hearing impaired. The benefit dinners held in conjunction with the award raised over $2 million towards throat cancer research in the 17 years that they were held. Two years after the Conacher Award was retired, Maple Leafs owner Harold Ballard presented the NHL with the King Clancy Memorial Trophy, also to be given to the league's top humanitarian. The new trophy was first awarded in 1987–88.

== Winners ==
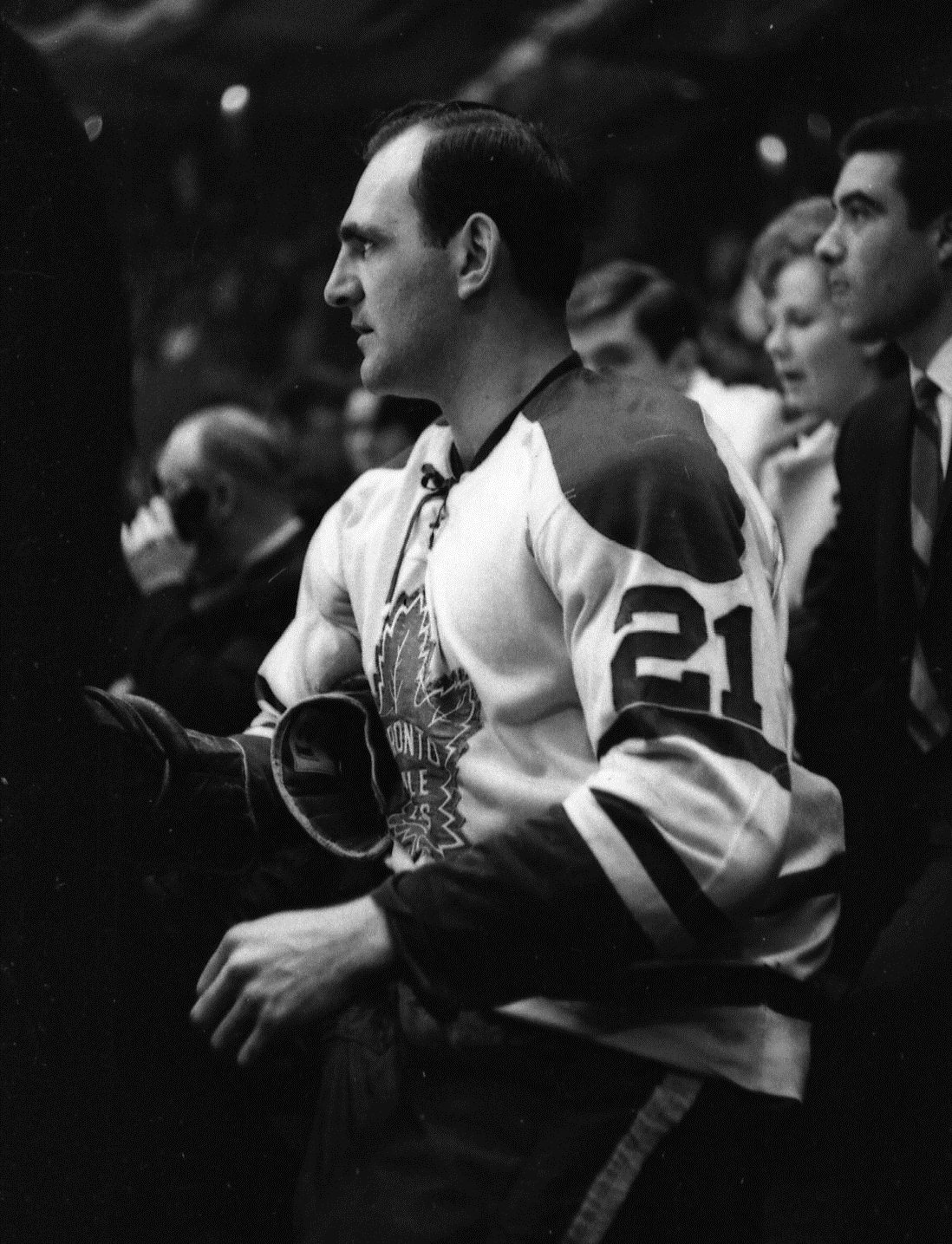
Bobby Baun was the second winner of the Charlie Conacher Trophy

Season	Winner	Team	Player's humanitarian contribution
1968–69	George Armstrong	Toronto Maple Leafs	
1969–70	Bobby Baun	Detroit Red Wings	Work with the Big Brothers of Toronto.
1970–71	Jean Beliveau	Montreal Canadiens	Co-winner
1970–71	Bobby Orr	Boston Bruins	Co-winner
1971–72	Orland Kurtenbach	Vancouver Canucks	
1972–73	Jimmy Peters, Jr.	Los Angeles Kings	Co-winner
1972–73	Gary Bergman	Detroit Red Wings	Co-winner
1973–74	Ed Westfall	New York Islanders	Work with the physically and mentally handicapped.
1974–75	Ted Irvine	New York Rangers	Charitable work on behalf of the mentally handicapped.
1975–76	Johnny Bucyk	Boston Bruins	
1976–77	Jim Lorentz	Buffalo Sabres	Work with muscular dystrophy programs in the United States.
1977–78	Bryan Watson	Washington Capitals	
1978–79	Ed Staniowski	St. Louis Blues	
1979–80	Wayne Gretzky	Edmonton Oilers	
1980–81	Ed Kea	St. Louis Blues	
1981–82	Borje Salming	Toronto Maple Leafs	
1982–83	Brad Park	Boston Bruins	Work with the Cerebral Palsy Association of Massachusetts.
1983–84	Jim Peplinski	Calgary Flames	Work with the Calgary Special Olympics and Big Brothers of Calgary
