= J. P. Bickell Memorial Award =

Canadian ice hockey award

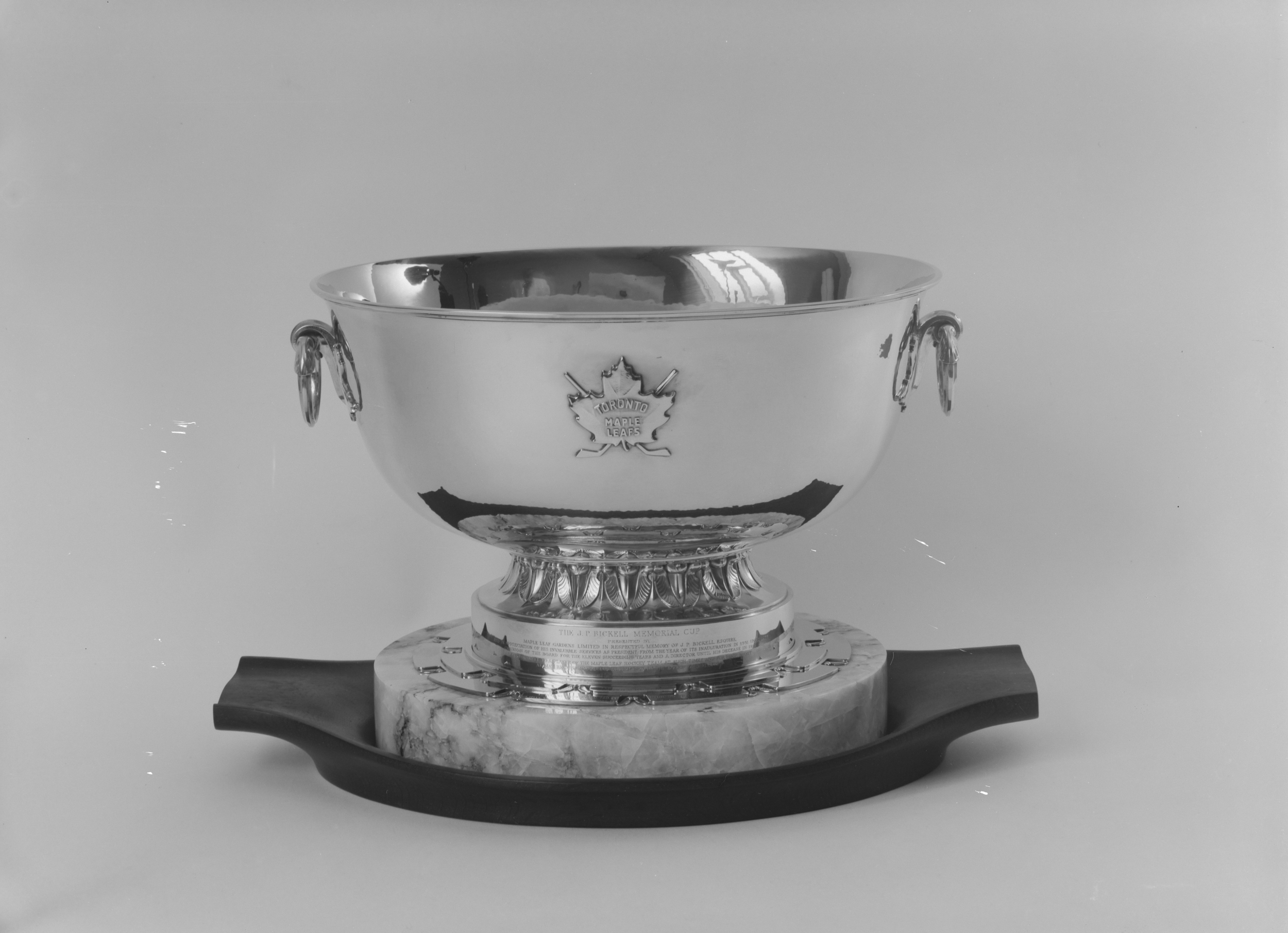
J.P. Bickell Memorial Award

The J. P. Bickell Memorial Award is named after the late Toronto businessman and hockey executive J. P. Bickell. The award was created by the Maple Leaf Gardens board of directors to honor Mr. Bickell's involvement as owner, president, chairman and director of the club from 1924 until 1951. Mr. Bickell was part of seven Stanley cup victories, his name appearing six times. His name did not appear on the cup in 1942 while he was serving in the war overseas.

Produced in 1953, the award was valued at $10,000, which makes it one of the costliest of all sports trophies, the Bickell Memorial Cup consists entirely of 14-karat gold on a silver base. The replica, which will become the property of the player given the award, also will be of 14-karat gold, and is valued at $500.

The inscription on the cup reads;

THE JP BICKELL MEMORIAL CUP
PRESENTED BY
MAPLE LEAF GARDENS LIMITED IN RESPECTFUL MEMORY OF JP BICKELL ESQUIRE
AND IN APPRECIATION OF HIS INVALUABLE SERVICES AS PRESIDENT FROM THE YEAR OF ITS INAUGURATION IN 1931 UNTIL 1951
CHAIRMAN OF THE BOARD FOR THE ELEVEN SUCCEEDING YEARS AND A DIRECTOR UNTIL HIS DECEASE IN 1951
TO BE AWARDED TO A PLAYER OF THE MAPLE LEAF HOCKEY TEAM AT SUCH TIMES AND FOR SUCH MERIT
AS MAY BE DESIGNATED AND DETERMINED BY THE BOARD OF DIRECTORS

The award is to be presented at the discretion of the Toronto Maple Leafs directors to a member of the Toronto Maple Leafs organization who performed with a very high standard of excellence over a single season or several years either on the ice as a player or within the executive office or a combination of both.

== Past recipients ==
- 1953 Ted Kennedy
- 1954 Harry Lumley
- 1955 Ted Kennedy
- 1956 Tod Sloan
- 1957 to 1958 not awarded
- 1959 George Armstrong & Bob Pulford
- 1960 Johnny Bower
- 1961 Red Kelly
- 1962 Dave Keon
- 1963 Dave Keon
- 1964 Johnny Bower
- 1965 Johnny Bower
- 1966 Allan Stanley
- 1967 Terry Sawchuk
- 1968 not awarded
- 1969 Tim Horton
- 1970 not awarded
- 1971 Bobby Baun
- 1972 King Clancy
- 1973 to 1978 not awarded
- 1979 Mike Palmateer
- 1980 to 1992 not awarded
- 1993 Doug Gilmour
- 1994 not awarded
- 1995 Bob Davidson
- 1996 to 1998 not awarded
- 1999 Mats Sundin & Curtis Joseph
- 2000 to 2002 not awarded
- 2003 Pat Quinn
- 2004 to 2017 not awarded
- 2018 Ian Turnbull
