= Bob Davidson (ice hockey) =

Canadian ice hockey player (1912–1996)

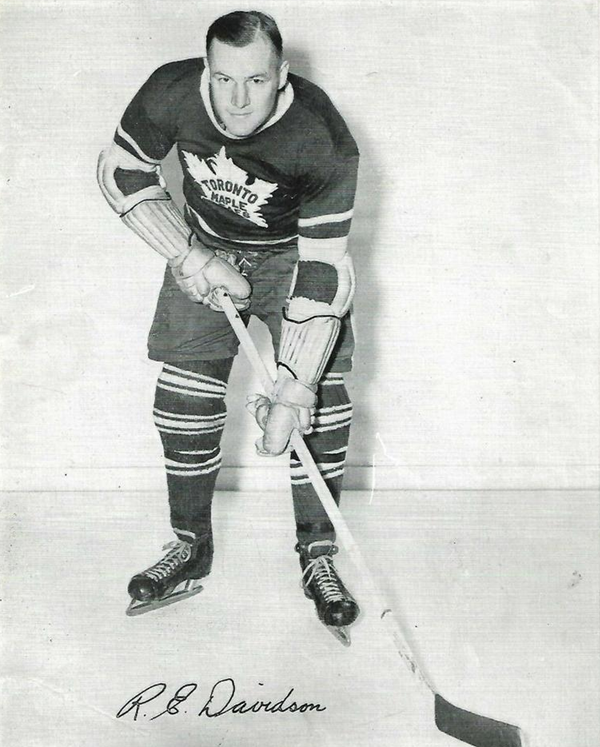
- Born: February 10, 1912 Toronto, Ontario, Canada
- Died: September 26, 1996 (aged 84)
- Height: 5 ft 11 in (180 cm)
- Weight: 185 lb (84 kg; 13 st 3 lb)
- Position: Left wing
- Shot: Left
- Played for: Toronto Maple Leafs
- Playing career: 1934–1946

Robert Earl Davidson (February 10, 1912 – September 26, 1996) was a Canadian professional ice hockey left winger who played 12 seasons in the National Hockey League for the Toronto Maple Leafs.

== Playing career ==
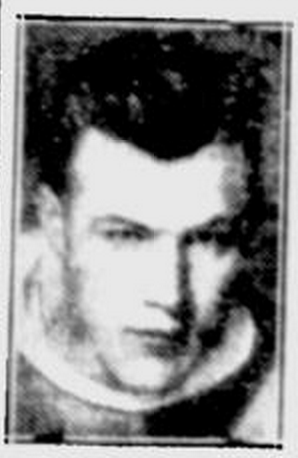
Davidson in late 1930s photo

Davidson on occasion went by the nickname "Rugged Robert" by his teammates. He played his entire NHL career with the Toronto Maple Leafs. He played in the NHL from 1933–34 to 1945–46. He played on two Stanley Cup winning teams. His first was in 1941–42 and his second in the 1944–45 season in which he was the Maple Leafs' captain. Davidson served as captain of the Maple Leafs from 1943–44 to 1944–45.

After his playing days were over he stayed on with the Maple Leafs in a number of different capacities. His most notable was as chief scout.

Davidson is considered by many to be one of the best hockey scouts of all time and was credited with building the Toronto Maple Leafs teams during the 1960s which dominated the NHL by winning the Stanley Cup four times (1961–62, 1962–63, 1963–64, 1966–67) within a six-year period. His name was engraved on the cup for 1962 and 1967, though was a member of all four cups wins by Toronto in the 1960s.

In 1995 the board of directors of the Maple Leafs organization awarded Davidson with the J. P. Bickell Memorial Award.

== Career statistics ==
=== Regular season and playoffs ===
			Regular season					Playoffs
Season	Team	League	GP	G	A	Pts	PIM	GP	G	A	Pts	PIM
1928–29	Toronto Canoe Club	OHA	—	—	—	—	—	—	—	—	—	—
1929–30	Toronto City Services	TMHL	—	—	—	—	—	—	—	—	—	—
1929–30	Toronto Canoe Club	OHA	9	0	0	0	2	—	—	—	—	—
1930–31	Toronto Canoe Club	OHA	9	6	4	10	10	2	1	0	1	2
1931–32	Toronto Canoe Club	OHA	8	6	3	9	7	1	1	0	1	0
1931–32	Toronto City Services	TMHL	12	6	3	9	10	2	1	0	1	0
1932–33	Toronto Marlboros	OHA	21	8	8	16	15	2	2	0	2	4
1932–33	Toronto City Services	TMHL	18	11	5	16	18	6	2	0	2	14
1933–34	Toronto Marlboros	OHA-Sr	6	6	2	8	6	—	—	—	—	—
1934–35	Toronto Maple Leafs	NHL	5	0	0	0	6	—	—	—	—	—
1934–35	Syracuse Stars	IHL	28	4	12	16	17	2	0	0	0	2
1935–36	Toronto Maple Leafs	NHL	35	4	4	8	32	9	1	3	4	2
1935–36	Syracuse Stars	IHL	13	3	4	7	22	—	—	—	—	—
1936–37	Toronto Maple Leafs	NHL	46	8	7	15	43	2	0	0	0	5
1937–38	Toronto Maple Leafs	NHL	48	3	17	20	52	4	0	2	2	7
1938–39	Toronto Maple Leafs	NHL	47	4	10	14	29	10	1	1	2	6
1939–40	Toronto Maple Leafs	NHL	48	8	18	26	56	10	0	3	3	16
1940–41	Toronto Maple Leafs	NHL	37	3	6	9	39	7	0	2	2	7
1941–42	Toronto Maple Leafs	NHL	37	6	20	26	39	13	1	2	3	20
1942–43	Toronto Maple Leafs	NHL	50	13	23	36	20	6	1	2	3	7
1943–44	Toronto Maple Leafs	NHL	47	19	28	47	21	5	0	0	0	4
1944–45	Toronto Maple Leafs	NHL	50	17	18	35	49	13	1	2	3	2
1945–46	Toronto Maple Leafs	NHL	41	9	9	18	12	—	—	—	—	—
NHL totals			491	94	150	254	398	79	5	17	22	76

== See also ==
- List of NHL players who spent their entire career with one franchise

Preceded by Syl Apps	Toronto Maple Leafs captain 1943–45	Succeeded by Syl Apps
