= Jim Peplinski =

Canadian ice hockey player (born 1960)

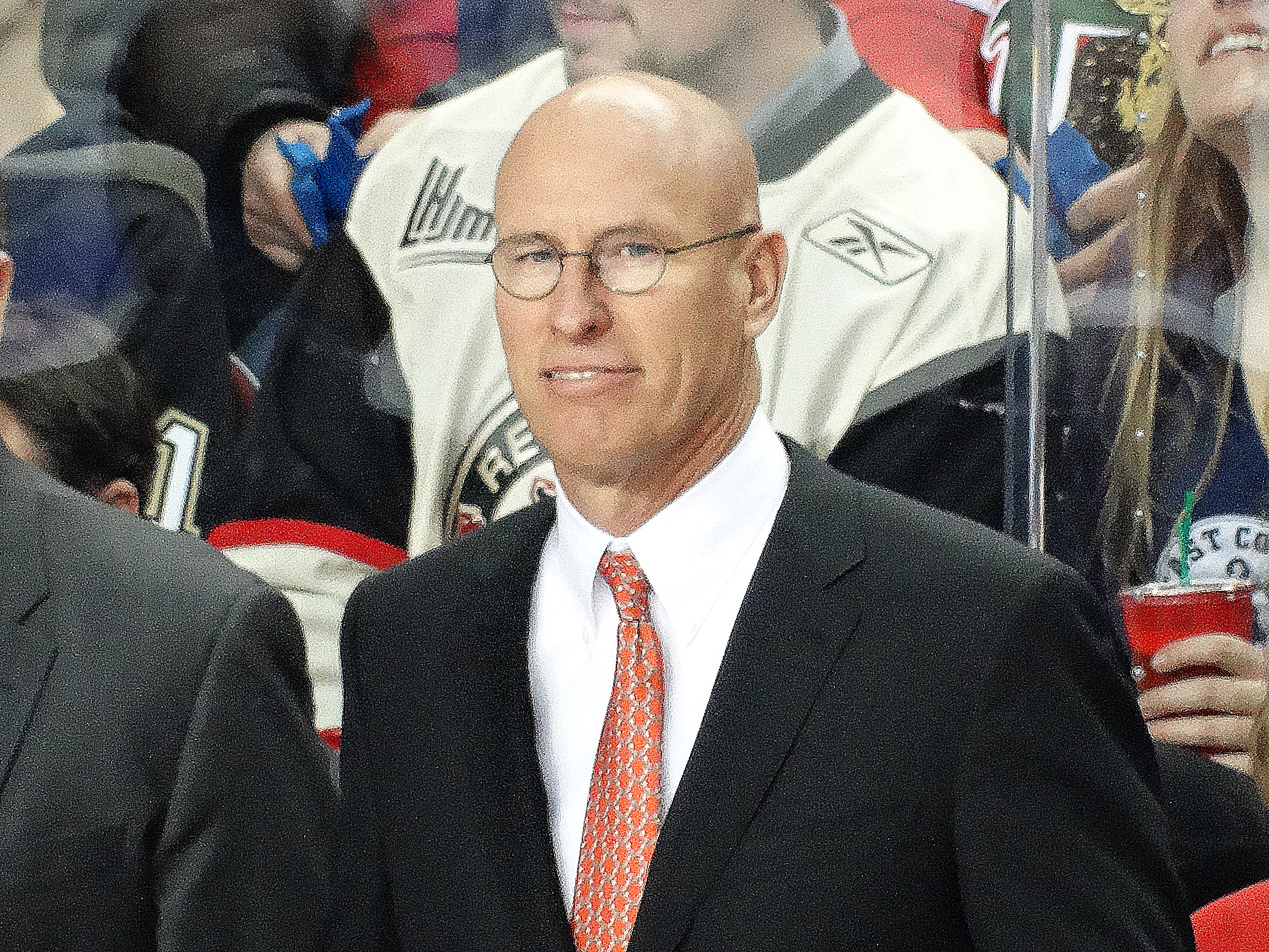
- Peplinski in 2014
- Born: October 24, 1960 (age 65) Renfrew, Ontario, Canada
- Height: 6 ft 3 in (191 cm)
- Weight: 210 lb (95 kg; 15 st 0 lb)
- Position: Right wing
- Shot: Right
- Played for: Calgary Flames
- National team: Canada
- NHL draft: 75th overall, 1979; Atlanta Flames
- Playing career: 1980–1990; 1994–1995

James Desmond Peplinski (born October 24, 1960) is a Canadian former National Hockey League (NHL) player. He played ten seasons in the NHL (all with the Calgary Flames) and won the Stanley Cup in 1989. He represented Canada at the 1988 Winter Olympics as a member of the national hockey team.

== Playing career ==
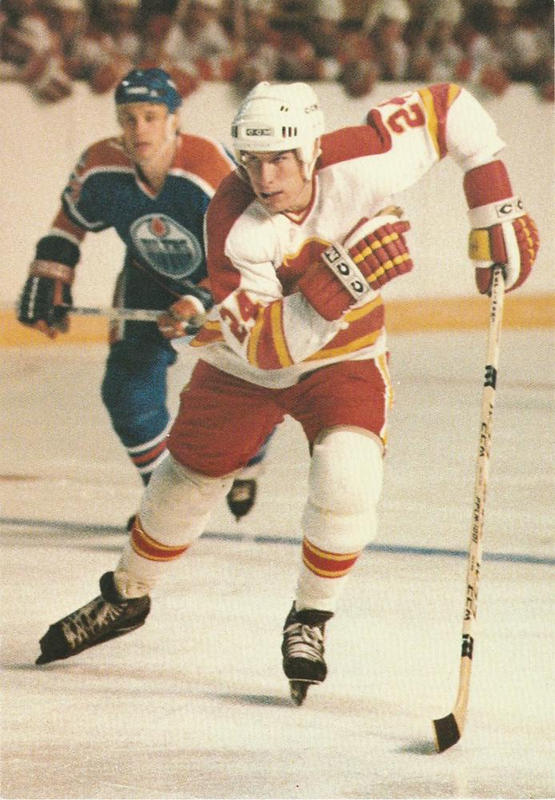
1982 postcard Peplinski in action for Calgary Flames against Edmonton Oilers

Peplinski played junior hockey for the Toronto Marlboros of the Ontario Major Junior Hockey League (OMJHL) between 1977 and 1980. He scored 101 points in 67 games in his final season of junior. The Atlanta Flames selected him with their fourth round selection, 75th overall, at the 1979 NHL entry draft. Following the franchise's relocation to Canada, he made his NHL debut in 1980 and was an original member of the Calgary Flames, scoring 38 points in his rookie season. Playing his 100th career game on November 17, 1981, Peplinski scored four goals against the Winnipeg Jets as part of a career high 30-goal, 67-point season in the 1981–82 season.

One of Peplinski's strengths was his durability. He missed only 24 games during his career, appearing in all 80 of the Flames' games in 1980–81, 1982–83, 1984–85 and 1986–87. He was named a tri-captain of the team, shared with Lanny McDonald and Doug Risebrough, in the 1984–85 season. For the 1988 Winter Olympics, the International Ice Hockey Federation opened the hockey tournament to all professionals. While the NHL refused to allow most of its players to participate, the Flames released Peplinski to the Canadian Olympic team. He appeared in seven games, scoring one assist for the fourth place Canadians.

In the Flames' Stanley Cup championship season of 1988–89, Peplinski scored 38 points in 79 games, and appeared in 20 more games in the 1989 Stanley Cup Playoffs. Prior to the sixth game of the final against the Montreal Canadiens, head coach Terry Crisp wanted to insert McDonald, who was expected to retire following the season (which he did on August 28, 1989), into the lineup for the possible clinching game. As a result, Peplinski was scratched from the line-up and watched as the team won the championship. He came onto the ice to accept the trophy with McDonald and alternate captain Tim Hunter.

Six games into the 1989–90 NHL season, Peplinski chose to retire on October 31, 1989. He left the game as the Flames' all-time leader in games played at 705. He moved to the broadcast booth, joining Hockey Night in Canada as a color commentator before attempting an NHL comeback in 1994–95. Jim was signed as a free agent by the Flames on April 6, 1995. His comeback lasted six more games before he left the game for good. Peplinski settled in Calgary after his retirement and remains active with the team's alumni association. He organized the alumni game between the Flames and Canadiens at the 2011 Heritage Classic.

Peplinski has the longest goal streak among the NHL players without scoring a power-play goal - 124, from his last power play goal on November 23, 1982 against the Washington Capitals and until his retirement.

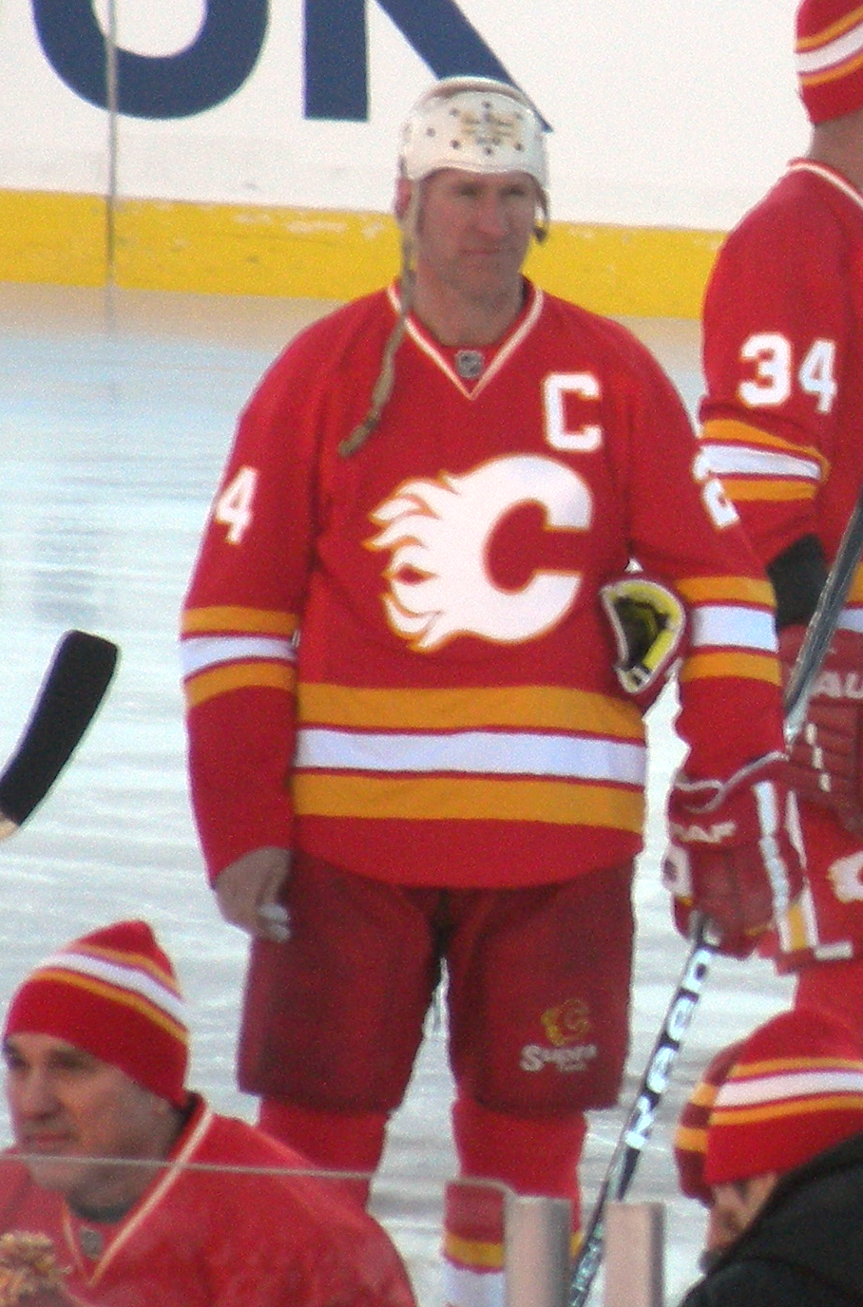
Peplinski prior to the alumni game at the 2011 Heritage Classic.

== Personal life ==
Upon retiring from the Flames, Peplinski invested in Hartfield Chieftain Leasing, a small vehicle leasing company. Starting with 565 units, split between operations in Calgary and Edmonton, the company initially struggled. In 1998, the company was thriving and merged with his father-in-law's leasing company in the East (Leasemaster), creating a national vehicle leasing firm, Jim Peplinski Leasing Inc. Peplinski remains the Chairman of Jim Peplinski Leasing which serves small to mid-sided fleet vehicles across the country.

Peplinski is also the Chairman of Properly Investment Company, a firm established to invest in entrepreneurs.

Peplinski has been recognized for his charitable contributions. He was named the final recipient of the Charlie Conacher Humanitarian Award in 1984 for his work in support of the Special Olympics and Big Brothers of Calgary. The Flames named him their recipient of the Ralph T. Scurfield Humanitarian Award in 1988.

Peplinski is married to Catherine (née Esplen), and they have four children together.

Arena 1 in the Jim Durrell Centre is named Jim Peplinski Arena.

== Career statistics ==
=== Regular season and playoffs ===
			Regular season					Playoffs
Season	Team	League	GP	G	A	Pts	PIM	GP	G	A	Pts	PIM
1976–77	Ottawa South Canadians	Midget AA	22	22	33	55	42	—	—	—	—	—
1977–78	Toronto Marlboros	OMJHL	66	13	28	41	44	5	2	2	4	26
1978–79	Toronto Marlboros	OMJHL	66	23	32	55	88	3	0	1	1	0
1979–80	Toronto Marlboros	OMJHL	67	35	66	101	89	4	1	2	3	15
1980–81	Calgary Flames	NHL	80	13	25	38	108	16	2	3	5	41
1981–82	Calgary Flames	NHL	74	30	37	67	115	3	1	0	1	13
1982–83	Calgary Flames	NHL	80	15	26	41	134	8	1	1	2	45
1983–84	Calgary Flames	NHL	74	11	22	33	114	11	3	4	7	21
1984–85	Calgary Flames	NHL	80	16	29	45	111	4	1	3	4	11
1985–86	Calgary Flames	NHL	77	24	35	59	214	22	5	9	14	107
1986–87	Calgary Flames	NHL	80	18	32	50	181	6	1	0	1	24
1987–88	Calgary Flames	NHL	75	20	31	51	234	9	0	5	5	45
1988–89	Calgary Flames	NHL	79	13	25	38	241	20	1	6	7	75
1989–90	Calgary Flames	NHL	6	1	0	1	4	—	—	—	—	—
1994–95	Calgary Flames	NHL	6	0	1	1	11	—	—	—	—	—
NHL totals			711	161	263	424	1,467	99	15	31	46	382

=== International ===
Year	Team	Comp	GP	G	A	Pts	PIM
1988	Canada	OG	7	0	1	1	6

Preceded by Lanny McDonald; Doug Risebrough	Calgary Flames captain 1984–89 with Doug Risebrough (1984–87) and Lanny McDonald (1984–89)	Succeeded by Brad McCrimmon
