= Dave Keon =

Canadian ice hockey player (born 1940)

- Hockey Hall of Fame, 1986
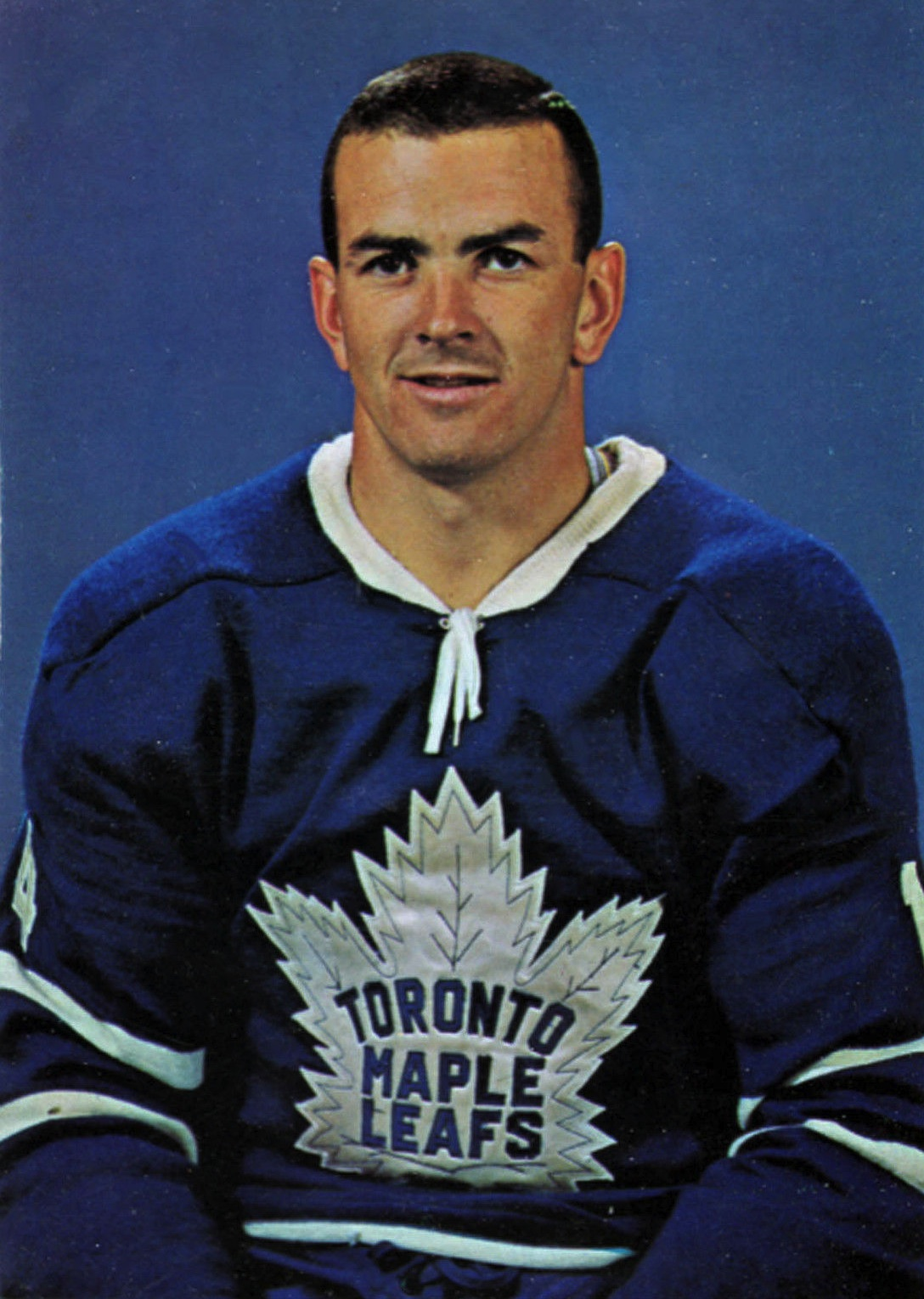
- Keon with the Toronto Maple Leafs, c. 1963
- Born: March 22, 1940 (age 86) Noranda, Quebec, Canada
- Height: 5 ft 9 in (175 cm)
- Weight: 163 lb (74 kg; 11 st 9 lb)
- Position: Centre
- Shot: Left
- Played for: Toronto Maple Leafs; Minnesota Fighting Saints; Indianapolis Racers; Hartford Whalers
- Playing career: 1960–1982

David Michael Keon (born March 22, 1940) is a Canadian former professional ice hockey centre. He played professionally from 1960 to 1982, including his first 15 seasons with the Toronto Maple Leafs where he won the Calder Memorial Trophy and four Stanley Cup Championships, and was inducted into the Hockey Hall of Fame in 1986. Keon was inducted into the Ontario Sports Hall of Fame in 2010. On October 16, 2016, as part of the Toronto Maple Leafs centennial celebrations, Keon was named the greatest player in the team's history. In 2017, Keon was named one of the 100 Greatest NHL Players in NHL history. In 2018, Keon was awarded the Order of Sport, marking his induction into Canada's Sports Hall of Fame.

== Playing career ==
=== Junior hockey ===
Keon played junior hockey in Toronto for the St. Michael's Buzzers of the Ontario Hockey Association's Metro Junior B league in 1956–57; on December 20, 1956, he scored seven goals in one game. In February 1957, he was named to the league's eastern all-star team and was picked by NHL scouts as the top prospect in the league. Keon was selected as the league's rookie of the year, finishing second in scoring, and his team won the league championship. He played some games that season for the Junior A St. Michael's Majors, and moved to that club full-time for the 1957–58 season. Keon played for St. Michael's through the end of the 1960 season, when he turned professional and joined the Sudbury Wolves of the Eastern Professional Hockey League for four playoff games. They would be the only games he would ever play in the minor leagues.

=== Toronto Maple Leafs ===
Keon joined the Toronto Maple Leafs of the National Hockey League for the 1960–61 season, winning the Calder Memorial Trophy as the league's top rookie with 20 goals and 45 points in his first season. It was his first of six consecutive 20-goal seasons. In his second year in the NHL, Keon was named to the second All-Star team and won the Lady Byng Memorial Trophy as the most gentlemanly player, taking only one minor penalty through the entire season. He repeated as Lady Byng winner in 1962–63, again taking only a single minor penalty all year.

He was the Leafs' leading scorer in the 1963–64, 1966–67 and 1969–70 seasons, and the team's top goal-scorer in 1970–71 and 1972–73. Keon was considered one of the fastest skaters in the NHL, and one of the best defensive forwards of his era. He would usually play against the opposing team's top centre, and developed a reputation for neutralizing some of the league's top scorers. In 1970–71, he scored eight shorthanded goals, setting an NHL record for most shorthanded goals scored in a single season, which would later be broken by Marcel Dionne in 1974–75, with 10 shorthanded goals (Dionne's record would be broken by Wayne Gretzky in 1983–84 with 12 shorthanded goals. In turn, Gretzky's record would be broken by Mario Lemieux in 1988–89, when Lemieux scored 13 shorthanded goals in a season).

Keon won four Stanley Cups with the Leafs, playing on the Cup-winning teams of 1961–62, 1962–63, 1963–64 and 1966–67. In the 1967 Cup Final, he shut down Jean Béliveau, the star centreman of the Montreal Canadiens, in the last two games of the series and was voted the most valuable player of the playoffs, winning the Conn Smythe Trophy. Keon's eight points are the fewest ever by a non-goalie Conn Smythe winner, and he remains the only Leaf to have won the trophy named for the former owner of the club.

He was named team captain on October 31, 1969, succeeding George Armstrong who was said to be retiring from hockey. Armstrong returned to the Leafs two weeks later and played for another two seasons, but Keon remained captain and would wear the C through the rest of his years with the Leafs.

Keon hoped to make Team Canada for the 1972 Summit Series, but was coming off one of the worst years of his career, finishing the 1971–72 season with his lowest points-per-game average since his rookie year. The final pick for Team Canada came down between Keon and Bobby Clarke. It is believed that Clarke was selected because he had more points.

While Keon was not selected for Team Canada, the Ottawa Nationals of the World Hockey Association made a strong effort to sign Keon, whom they had placed on their negotiation list earlier that year. Harold Ballard, who had become the Leafs' majority owner in March 1972, said that Keon did not provide the leadership the team needed during the previous season and was refusing to give Keon a big salary increase after a poor year. Keon signed a letter of intent with the Nationals and received a $50,000 cheque from the team, but the deal fell apart just before training camp. Keon signed a three-year deal with the Leafs, and rebounded strongly in 1972–73, scoring 37 goals. On November 22, 1972, he scored his 297th goal as a Leaf, passing Armstrong and Frank Mahovlich to become the team's all-time leading goal scorer.

Early into the 1974–75 season, Ballard publicly blasted Keon, saying that the team was not getting good leadership from its captain and vowing never again to agree to a no-trade clause in a contract, as he had with Keon. When Keon's contract expired at the end of the season, Ballard made it clear that there was no place for him on the Leafs. The Leafs believed they had some strong young prospects at centre who needed more ice time, and Keon was again asking for a contract with a no-trade clause. The 35-year-old Keon was told he could make his own deal with another NHL team, but any club signing him would have been required to provide compensation to the Leafs. Ballard set the compensation price so high that other teams shied away from signing him, even though the Leafs had no intention of keeping him. In effect, Ballard had blocked Keon from going to another NHL team.

=== WHA ===
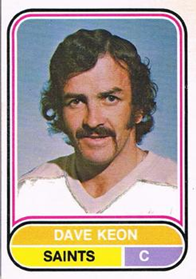
1975-76 card of Keon for Minnesota Fighting Saints of the WHA

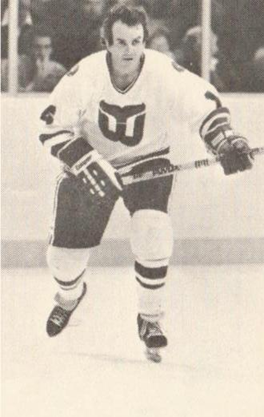
Keon with the Whalers in 1981.

In August 1975, with the Leafs still controlling his NHL rights, Keon reluctantly jumped to the World Hockey Association, signing a deal with the Minnesota Fighting Saints reportedly worth $300,000 over two seasons. Keon chose to play for the Saints after they agreed to a no-trade clause, and also because head coach Harry Neale was an old friend of Keon's. The team, and Keon, played well, but the team struggled badly financially due in large part to being in direct competition with the NHL's Minnesota North Stars. With 21 games left in the season, the team folded. Keon refused to waive his no-trade clause since he had always planned to return to the NHL once his stint with the Saints was over. He was thus not included in the dispersal sale of Saints players to other WHA teams. The New York Islanders expressed a strong interest in signing Keon, but they needed to negotiate a deal for his NHL rights with the Leafs. Again, the Leafs' asking price (said to have been a first-round draft pick) was too high, and a disappointed Keon signed with the WHA's Indianapolis Racers in March 1976.

The Fighting Saints were revived for the start of the WHA's 1976–77 season, and Keon agreed to a trade back to Minnesota. However, the team folded for good in January 1977 (with Keon as its leading scorer). Keon's WHA rights were briefly claimed by the Edmonton Oilers, but they immediately agreed to trade him to the New England Whalers. The move re-united Keon with Neale, who had taken over the Whalers after the original Fighting Saints' demise.

=== Return to NHL ===
Keon would remain with the Whalers through the rest of his career. In the 1977–78 season, he was joined on the Whalers by Gordie Howe who, at age 50, was the team's leading scorer that season. Keon returned to the NHL in 1979 when the renamed Hartford Whalers became one of four WHA teams to join the NHL. The merger agreement allowed existing NHL teams to reclaim most of the WHA players whose NHL rights they held. Nevertheless, even though Keon was not protected from reclamation by the Whalers in the reclamation draft, the Maple Leafs declined to reclaim their former captain, allowing him to remain in Hartford. Bobby Hull joined the Whalers that season, with Keon, Howe, and Hull sometimes playing as a forward line. Howe and Hull retired at the end of the season. Terry Harper's retirement in 1981 left Keon as the oldest active player in the NHL. Keon played two more seasons with the Whalers and announced his retirement on June 30, 1982, at age 42. Keon was the last active player who played a full season in the Original Six era.

== Retirement ==
Following his retirement from hockey, Keon moved to Florida and worked in real estate for several years.

Bitter over his treatment by Ballard and the Leafs, Keon refused for many years to have any relationship with the Leafs organization, even after Ballard's death and after the club changed ownership several times. Other Leaf players who clashed with Ballard's management did reconcile, most notably Keon's successor as club captain, Darryl Sittler, who accepted an invitation from GM Cliff Fletcher to return as a consultant after the team came under the ownership of Steve Stavro.

Keon turned down several offers of reconciliation from the team, including an invitation to the closing ceremony for Maple Leaf Gardens in 1999 and a proposed ceremony to honour his number.

On March 22, 1991, with the Leafs under new management after Ballard's death, Keon played on a team of Leaf all-stars against their counterparts from the Montreal Canadiens in an old-timers game at Maple Leaf Gardens called Legends' Night in Canada. "After that, I figured out the new ownership was no different than Ballard, and I had no use for it," Keon later said. In 2005, he told the Toronto Sun that the new owners (majority equity owned by the Ontario Teachers' Pension Plan, chaired by Larry Tanenbaum) "would like to say they are different, but they are all the same."

In January 2007, the Toronto Maple Leafs announced that Keon would attend a pre-game ceremony to honour its 1967 Stanley Cup-winning team. Keon was one of several members of the 1967 team to appear on-ice at the Air Canada Centre before the Leafs' game on February 17, 2007 — the 80th anniversary of the first game played by the Toronto franchise after being renamed the Maple Leafs in 1927. Keon was introduced to the crowd second last, just before 1967 captain George Armstrong, and received a long-standing ovation. On February 16, 2013, Keon was a part of a pre-game ceremony honouring the 1963 Stanley Cup-winning Leafs team. He similarly appeared on February 8, 2014, with other members of the 1964 Cup winners.

On January 21, 2016, it was announced that Keon, along with former Maple Leafs Turk Broda and Tim Horton, would be commemorated with a statue on Legends Row in front of the Air Canada Centre, joining former Maple Leafs greats Syl Apps, Teeder Kennedy, Johnny Bower, George Armstrong, Darryl Sittler, Borje Salming, and Mats Sundin.

On October 14, 2016, the Toronto Maple Leafs released their list of the top 100 Leafs of all time. Based on the votes of fans and a 31-member expert panel, Keon was voted the greatest Toronto Maple Leaf.

On October 15, 2016, the Maple Leafs retired Dave Keon's number 14 at a ceremony honouring the Maple Leafs' centenary.

== Personal life ==
Keon is of Irish descent on his father's side, with roots in County Sligo. His granddaughter, Kaitlyn Keon, played on the Brown Bears women's ice hockey program from 2011 to 2015, accumulating 34 points.

== Awards and honours ==
- Calder Memorial Trophy: 1961
- Lady Byng Memorial Trophy: 1962, 1963
- NHL second All-Star team: 1962, 1971
- NHL All-Star Game: 1962, 1963, 1964, 1967, 1968, 1970, 1971, 1973
- Stanley Cup: 1962, 1963, 1964, 1967
- J. P. Bickell Cup: 1962, 1963
- Conn Smythe Trophy: 1967
- Paul Deneau Trophy: 1977, 1978
- Hockey Hall of Fame: 1986
- In 1998, Keon was ranked number 69 on The Hockey News' list of the 100 Greatest Hockey Players
- The Aréna Dave Keon in Rouyn-Noranda, Quebec is named in his honour
- Inaugural member of the World Hockey Association Hall of Fame in the "Legends of the game" category: 2010
- Ontario Sports Hall of Fame: 2010
- Statue on Toronto's Legends Row in front of Scotiabank Arena.
- Quebec Sports Hall of Fame: 2016
- Greatest Toronto Maple Leaf
- #14 jersey retired by the Toronto Maple Leafs.
- In January 2017, Keon was commemorated as one of the 100 Greatest NHL Players.
- Order of Sport, Canada's Sports Hall of Fame, 2018

== Career statistics ==
=== Regular season and playoffs ===
			Regular season					Playoffs
Season	Team	League	GP	G	A	Pts	PIM	GP	G	A	Pts	PIM
1956–57	St. Michael's Buzzers	MetJHL	23	30	22	52	14	—	—	—	—	—
1956–57	Toronto St. Michael's Majors	OHA-Jr.	4	1	3	4	0	—	—	—	—	—
1957–58	Toronto St. Michael's Majors	OHA-Jr.	45	23	27	50	29	9	8	5	13	10
1958–59	Toronto St. Michael's Majors	OHA-Jr.	47	33	38	71	31	15	4	9	13	8
1959–60	Toronto St. Michael's Majors	OHA-Jr.	46	16	29	45	8	10	8	10	18	2
1959–60	Kitchener-Waterloo Dutchmen	OHA-Sr.	1	1	0	1	0	—	—	—	—	—
1959–60	Sudbury Wolves	EPHL	—	—	—	—	—	4	2	2	4	2
1960–61	Toronto Maple Leafs	NHL	70	20	25	45	6	5	1	1	2	0
1961–62	Toronto Maple Leafs	NHL	64	26	35	61	2	12	5	3	8	0
1962–63	Toronto Maple Leafs	NHL	68	28	38	66	2	10	7	5	12	0
1963–64	Toronto Maple Leafs	NHL	70	23	37	60	6	14	7	2	9	2
1964–65	Toronto Maple Leafs	NHL	65	21	29	50	10	6	2	2	4	2
1965–66	Toronto Maple Leafs	NHL	69	24	30	54	4	4	0	2	2	0
1966–67	Toronto Maple Leafs	NHL	66	19	33	52	2	12	3	5	8	0
1967–68	Toronto Maple Leafs	NHL	67	11	37	48	4	—	—	—	—	—
1968–69	Toronto Maple Leafs	NHL	75	27	34	61	12	4	1	3	4	2
1969–70	Toronto Maple Leafs	NHL	72	32	30	62	6	—	—	—	—	—
1970–71	Toronto Maple Leafs	NHL	76	38	38	76	4	6	3	2	5	0
1971–72	Toronto Maple Leafs	NHL	72	18	30	48	4	5	2	3	5	0
1972–73	Toronto Maple Leafs	NHL	76	37	36	73	2	—	—	—	—	—
1973–74	Toronto Maple Leafs	NHL	74	25	28	53	7	4	1	2	3	0
1974–75	Toronto Maple Leafs	NHL	78	16	43	59	4	7	0	5	5	0
1975–76	Minnesota Fighting Saints	WHA	57	26	38	64	4	—	—	—	—	—
1975–76	Indianapolis Racers	WHA	12	3	7	10	2	7	2	2	4	2
1976–77	Minnesota Fighting Saints	WHA	42	13	38	51	2	—	—	—	—	—
1976–77	New England Whalers	WHA	34	14	25	39	8	5	3	1	4	0
1977–78	New England Whalers	WHA	77	24	38	62	2	14	5	11	16	4
1978–79	New England Whalers	WHA	79	22	43	65	2	10	3	9	12	2
1979–80	Hartford Whalers	NHL	76	10	52	62	10	3	0	1	1	0
1980–81	Hartford Whalers	NHL	80	13	34	47	26	—	—	—	—	—
1981–82	Hartford Whalers	NHL	78	8	11	19	6	—	—	—	—	—
NHL totals			1,296	396	590	986	117	92	32	36	68	6
WHA totals			301	102	189	291	20	36	13	23	36	8

== See also ==
- Captain (ice hockey)
- List of NHL players with 1,000 games played

Sporting positions
Preceded by Mike Rogers	Hartford Whalers captain 1981–82	Succeeded by Russ Anderson
Preceded by George Armstrong	Toronto Maple Leafs captain 1969–75	Succeeded by Darryl Sittler
Awards and achievements
Preceded by Roger Crozier	Winner of the Conn Smythe Trophy; 1967	Succeeded by Glenn Hall
Preceded by Bill Hay	Winner of the Calder Memorial Trophy; 1961	Succeeded by Bobby Rousseau
Preceded by Red Kelly	Winner of the Lady Byng Trophy; 1962, 1963	Succeeded by Ken Wharram
