= 16th National Hockey League All-Star Game =

Professional ice hockey exhibition game

16th NHL All-Star Game
	1	2	3	Total
All-Stars	1	0	0	1
Toronto Maple Leafs	4	0	0	4
- Date: October 6, 1962
- Arena: Maple Leaf Gardens
- City: Toronto
- MVP: Eddie Shack (Toronto)
- Attendance: 14,236

The 16th National Hockey League All-Star Game took place at Maple Leaf Gardens on October 6, 1962. The hometown Toronto Maple Leafs defeated the NHL all-stars 4–1.

== The game ==
Eddie Shack was named the first ever all-star game MVP, as the Toronto Maple Leafs erupted for four goals in the opening period against all-star goaltender Jacques Plante of the Montreal Canadiens. It was the first victory for the Maple Leafs in the annual classic, after falling to the All-Stars in 1947, 1948 and 1949.

Shack scored Toronto's fourth goal. Dick Duff, Bob Pulford and Frank Mahovlich also scored for the Leafs, while Gordie Howe, appearing in his record 14th all-star game, beat Johnny Bower.

In the days leading up to the game, the NHL was worried because Toronto had only two players under contract—rookie Kent Douglas and captain George Armstrong; however, last minute efforts led to all players signing contracts in time to appear in the game.

=== Game summary ===
	Toronto Maple Leafs	All-Stars
Final score	4	1
Head coach	Punch Imlach	Rudy Pilous (Chicago Black Hawks)
Lineup	1 - G Johnny Bower; 2 - D Carl Brewer; 4 - C Red Kelly; 7 - D Tim Horton; 9 - LW Dick Duff; 10 - RW George Armstrong (captain); 11 - RW Bob Nevin; 12 - RW Ron Stewart; 14 - C Dave Keon; 15 - C Bill Harris; 19 - D Kent Douglas; 20 - C Bob Pulford; 21 - D Bobby Baun; 22 - D Larry Hillman; 23 - LW Eddie Shack; 24 - LW John MacMillan; 25 - RW Ed Litzenberger; 26 - D Allan Stanley; 27 - LW Frank Mahovlich	First team All-Stars: 1 - G Jacques Plante (Montreal Canadiens); 2 - D Doug Harvey (New York Rangers); 4 - D Jean-Guy Talbot (Montreal Canadiens); 6 - RW Andy Bathgate (New York Rangers); 11 - LW Bobby Hull (Chicago Black Hawks); Second team All-Stars: 1 - G Glenn Hall (Chicago Black Hawks); 3 - D Pierre Pilote (Chicago Black Hawks); 9 - RW Gordie Howe (Detroit Red Wings); Other players: 1 - G Gump Worsley (New York Rangers); 5 - RW Bernie Geoffrion (Montreal Canadiens); 7 - C Norm Ullman (Detroit Red Wings); 10 - LW Alex Delvecchio (Detroit Red Wings); 12 - C Ralph Backstrom (Montreal Canadiens); 15 - LW Dean Prentice (New York Rangers); 17 - C Don McKenney (Boston Bruins); 19 - D Doug Mohns (Boston Bruins); 20 - D Leo Boivin (Boston Bruins)
Scoring summary	Duff (Armstrong, Douglas) 5:22 first (power-play); Pulford (Stewart) 10:45 first; Mahovlich (Stanley) 13:03 first; Shack (Keon) 19:32 first	Howe (Delvecchio, Pilote) 7:26 first (power-play)
Penalties	Nevin 6:16 first; Brewer 12:41 first; Shack 15:39 first; Kelly 1:56 second; Brewer 18:30 second; Baun 13:03 third; Shack 19:21 third	Mohns 4:32 first; McKenney 12:41 first; Howe 15:39 first; Howe 16:33 second; Boivin 17:35 third
Win/loss	Johnny Bower	Jacques Plante

Shots on goal
Toronto	16	10	10	36
All-Stars	10	12	11	33

- Referee: Eddie Powers
- Linesmen: Matt Pavelich and Ron Wicks
- Attendance: 14,236
