= George Armstrong (ice hockey) =

Canadian ice hockey player (1930–2021)

- Hockey Hall of Fame, 1975
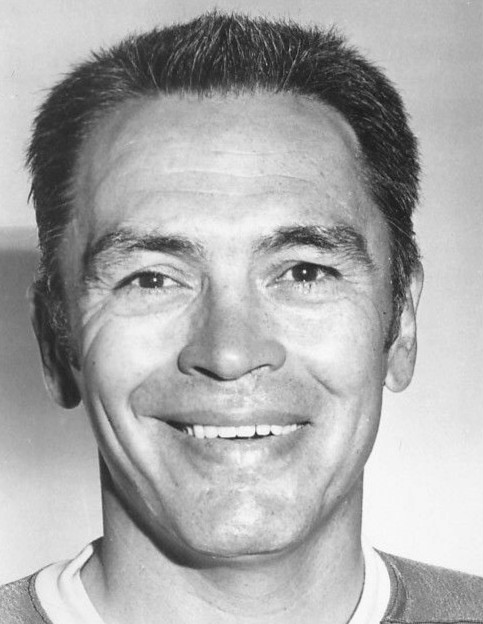
- Armstrong with the Toronto Maple Leafs in 1970
- Born: July 6, 1930 Skead, Ontario, Canada
- Died: January 24, 2021 (aged 90) Toronto, Ontario, Canada
- Height: 6 ft 1 in (185 cm)
- Weight: 184 lb (83 kg; 13 st 2 lb)
- Position: Right wing
- Shot: Right
- Played for: Toronto Maple Leafs
- Playing career: 1949–1971

George Edward Armstrong (July 6, 1930 – January 24, 2021) was a Canadian professional ice hockey player. A centre, he played 21 seasons in the National Hockey League (NHL) for the Toronto Maple Leafs. He played 1,188 NHL games between 1950 and 1971, all with Toronto and a franchise record. He was the team's captain for 13 seasons. Armstrong was a member of four Stanley Cup championship teams and played in seven NHL All-Star Games. He scored the final goal of the NHL's "Original Six" era as Toronto won the 1967 Stanley Cup.

Armstrong played both junior and senior hockey in the Toronto Marlboros organization and was a member of the 1950 Allan Cup winning team as senior champions of Canada. He returned to the Marlboros following his playing career and coached the junior team to two Memorial Cup championships. He served as a scout for the Quebec Nordiques, as an assistant general manager of the Maple Leafs and for part of the 1988–89 NHL season as Toronto's head coach. Armstrong was inducted into the Hockey Hall of Fame in 1975 and the Maple Leafs honoured his uniform number 10 in 1998, and later officially retired the number, along with ten others, during a pre-game ceremony on October 15, 2016.

== Early life ==
Armstrong was born in 1930 in Skead, Ontario, to an Irish Canadian father, Frederick James Armstrong, and a mixed Algonquin-Anishinabe mother, Alice Decaire. The couple were married in Sudbury in 1929 and George arrived eleven months later. He grew up in Falconbridge, Ontario, where his father was a nickel miner. He had one sister, Lillian Ellen McCourt. Sport was an important part of Armstrong's family as his father played soccer and his mother was a canoeist. The younger Armstrong developed a passion for hockey but was a poor skater, which his father believed was a consequence of a case of spinal meningitis George suffered at the age of six.

While attending Sudbury High School, Armstrong played on the hockey team with Red McCarthy and Tim Horton. Inspired by a newspaper advertisement offering tryouts with the Copper Cliff Redmen of the Northern Ontario Junior Hockey Association (NOJHA), Armstrong convinced Horton and McCarthy to join him in trying out. They made the team and Armstrong began his junior hockey career at age 16 in the 1946–47 season. He recorded six goals and five assists in nine games and caught the attention of scouts for the National Hockey League (NHL)'s Toronto Maple Leafs who added him to their protected list. He also played with the Prince Albert Blackhawks for part of that season. Armstrong quit school in grade 11 to focus on his hockey career.

== Playing career ==
=== Junior and senior ===
The Maple Leafs placed Armstrong on the Stratford Kroehlers in the Ontario Hockey Association (OHA) junior division for the 1947–48 season. He led the league in both assists (43) and points (73), and was named recipient of the Red Tilson Trophy as the OHA's most valuable player. Promoted to the Toronto Marlboros for the 1948–49 season, Armstrong recorded 62 points in 39 games with the junior squad and played in three regular season and ten post-season matches for the senior team. Armstrong remained with the senior Marlboros in 1949–50 where he served as captain. He led the OHA senior division with 64 goals, at the time an OHA record, and recorded 115 points in 39 games. He was again named the winner of the Red Tilson Trophy.

The Maple Leafs briefly recalled Armstrong during the 1949–50 season and he made his NHL debut on December 3, 1949. He appeared in two games before returning to the Marlboros. In the 1950 Allan Cup playdowns, he recorded 19 goals and 19 assists in 14 games as the Marlboros won the national senior championship. It was also during the season that he earned his nickname. While visiting the Stoney Reserve in Alberta with the Marlboros, the locals presented Armstrong with a ceremonial headdress and called him "Big Chief Shoot the Puck" owing to his own Native heritage. The nickname was often shortened to "Chief".

=== Toronto Maple Leafs ===
"This kid's got everything. He has size, speed, and he can shoot 'em into the net better that any hockey player I've known in a long time. I'll be surprised if he doesn't become a superstar."

— Toronto's assistant general manager King Clancy's assessment of Armstrong in 1952.

Upon turning professional in 1950–51, Armstrong was assigned to Toronto's American Hockey League (AHL) affiliate, the Pittsburgh Hornets. In 71 games for Pittsburgh, he recorded 15 goals and 48 points. Despite being hampered by hand and wrist injuries suffered in fights, Armstrong was the AHL's leading goal scorer and stood second in points by mid-season in 1951–52. He was recalled to Toronto during the season and scored his first NHL goal, against goaltender Gerry McNeil of the Montreal Canadiens. It was the first goal ever scored by a player with Native heritage. He finished the season with three goals and three assists in 20 games with Toronto.

Though he missed the start of the 1952–53 season due to a separated shoulder, Armstrong earned a permanent spot on the Maple Leafs' roster. He quietly established himself as an important contributor for Toronto by recording 25 points that season, then scoring 32 points the following season and 28 in 1954–55. A 48-point season in 1955–56 was second on the team to Tod Sloan's 66. Armstrong then led the Maple Leafs in scoring with 44 points in 1956–57 despite missing 14 of his team's games. He was named to play in the NHL All-Star Game in both seasons. They were the first two of seven he ultimately played.

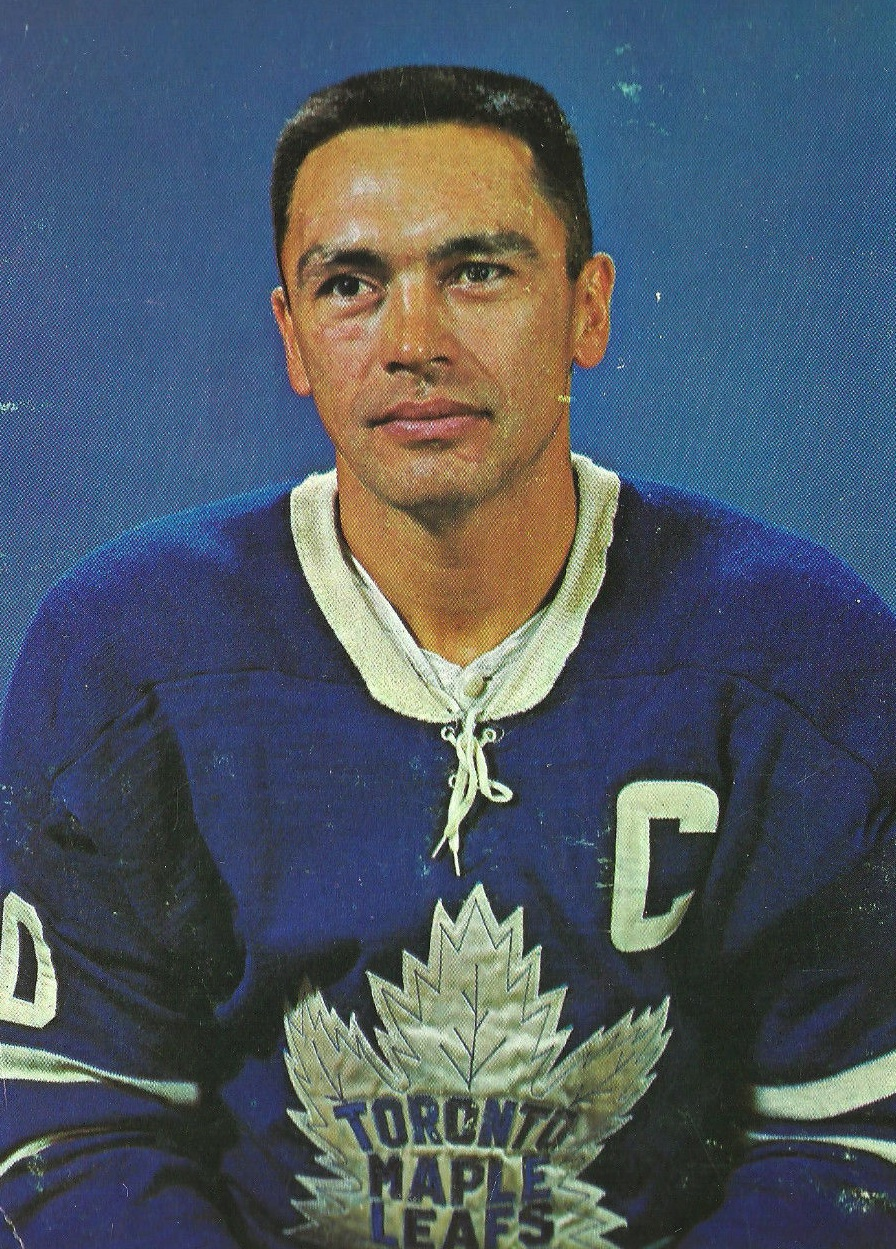
Armstrong was named captain of the Toronto Maple Leafs during the 1957–58 season.

The Maple Leafs named Armstrong the team's captain in 1957–58 as he succeeded Ted Kennedy and Jim Thomson who served as co-captains the season before. He finished fourth in team scoring with 42 points, then played his third All-Star Game during the 1958–59 season. He recorded four assists in the playoffs as the Maple Leafs reached the 1959 Stanley Cup Final, but lost to the Montreal Canadiens. With 51 points in 1959–60, Armstrong finished one behind Bob Pulford for the team lead. Toronto again reached the Stanley Cup Final where they were again eliminated by Montreal.

The Maple Leafs finally reached the NHL's peak two seasons later. Armstrong set a career high with 53 points in the 1961–62 regular season, then added 12 points in 12 playoff games for Toronto. He started the play that resulted in the Stanley Cup clinching goal, rushing the puck up ice before passing to Tim Horton, who then passed to goal-scorer Dick Duff that capped off a 2–1 victory in the sixth and deciding game of the series against the Chicago Black Hawks. As Maple Leafs captain, Armstrong was presented the trophy by league president Clarence Campbell. It was the first of three consecutive championships for Toronto as the Maple Leafs of 1962–1964 became the fourth dynasty in NHL history. Individually, Armstrong scored 21, 19 and 20 goals over the three seasons and by virtue of the NHL's All-Star Game format of the time that had the defending champion play the all-stars of the remaining teams, appeared in his fourth, fifth and sixth All-Star Games. Early in the 1963–64 season, on December 1, 1963, Armstrong scored his 200th career NHL goal.

A 37-point season followed in 1964–65, then 51 points the 1965–66 season. By 1966–67, Armstrong led an aging Maple Leafs team which entered the playoffs as an underdog against a dominant Chicago team. The Maple Leafs nonetheless eliminated the Black Hawks in six games to set up the 1967 Stanley Cup Final against Montreal. The Canadiens were so confident of victory that a display area for the Stanley Cup had been set up at the Quebec pavilion at Expo 67 in Montreal prior to the series' start. The Maple Leafs dashed Montreal's hopes by winning the championship in six games. Armstrong scored the final goal of the series in a 3–1 victory in the deciding contest. It was also the last goal scored in the NHL's "Original Six" era as the league was set to double in size to 12 teams for the 1967–68 season.

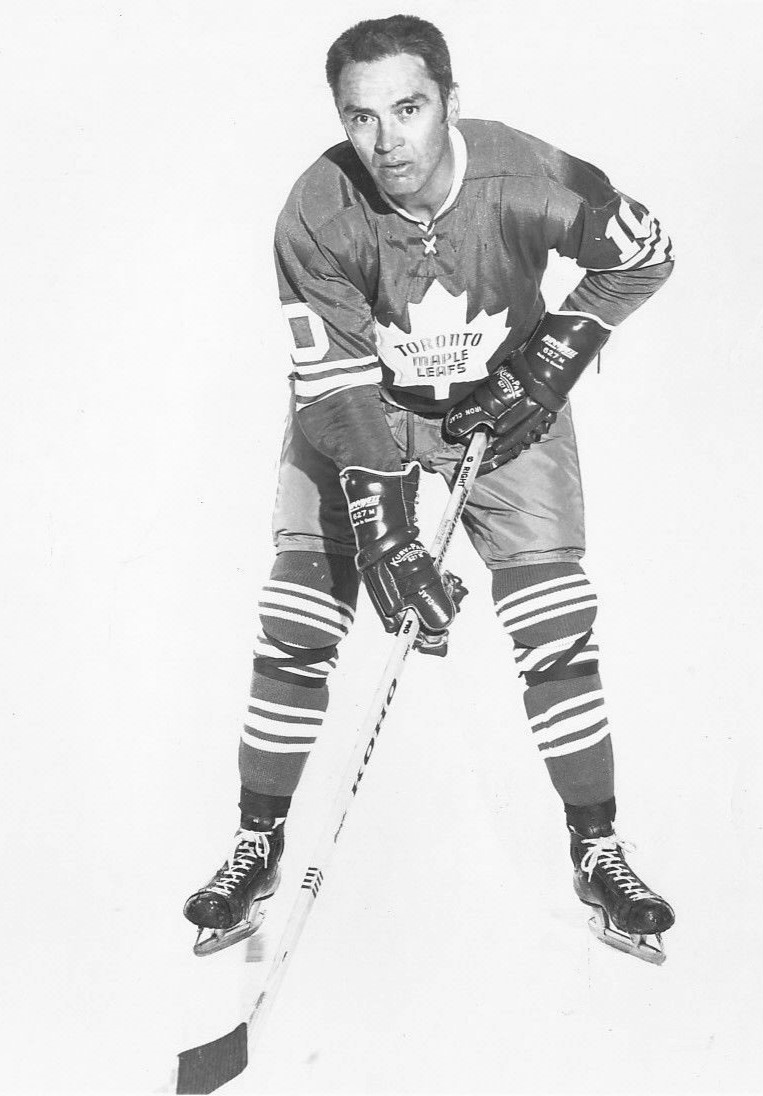
Armstrong with the Maple Leafs during the 1970–71 season. He retired at the end of that season.

Armstrong announced his intention to retire as a player following the championship then changed his mind and returned for another season. The Maple Leafs placed him on their protected list for the 1967 Expansion Draft and he remained with Toronto. He played in his seventh All-Star Game in 1968 and finished the season with 34 points. Retiring following the season before changing his mind became an annual event for Armstrong as he announced his intention to leave the game in five straight years. He remained a consistent scorer for Toronto, recording 27, 28 and 25 points in his following three seasons. He finally ended his playing career after the 1970–71 season to take an office position with the Maple Leafs finishing his career with two hundred and ninety-six goals, four goals away from obtaining three hundred. At the time of his retirement, Armstrong was second to Dit Clapper for the longest tenure as a team captain in NHL history.

== Coaching and scouting career ==
Armstrong was announced as the head coach of his former junior team, the Toronto Marlboros, in July 1972. Though he had preferred his previous role as a scout to coaching, Armstrong led the Marlboros to Memorial Cup victories on two occasions: in 1973 and 1975. In 1977, Armstrong's name circulated as a possible successor to Maple Leafs coach Red Kelly when the latter was fired by the team. When approached by the organization with the prospect of assuming head coaching duties however, Armstrong rejected the possibility. His decision resulted in animosity from within the organization and subsequently led to his resignation as coach of the Marlboros that season to accept a scouting post with the Quebec Nordiques.

Some 10 years later, Armstrong returned to the Maple Leafs organization in the dual capacities of assistant general manager and scout. During the 1988–89 season, and after management had fired head coach John Brophy, team owner Harold Ballard was adamant that Armstrong be named Brophy's replacement. Armstrong agreed to take the position, but increasingly delegated majority of his duties to assistant coach Garry Lariviere. The Maple Leafs finished with 17 wins in 47 Armstrong's games coached, falling just short of the fourth and final playoff berth in the Norris Division. Needing a win in their final regular season game, against the Chicago Blackhawks at Chicago Stadium, to capture the playoff berth, the Leafs would heartbreakingly lose to the Hawks in overtime. Armstrong was replaced by Doug Carpenter the following season and returned to his scouting capacities with the team. Armstrong remained a scout for the rest of his life. In 1972–73, he was selected as Coach of the Year by his peers in the OHL (Toronto Marlboros).

== Playing style ==
The Toronto Maple Leafs described Armstrong as being a "consistent, durable and hardworking" player throughout his 21-season career that spanned parts of four decades. A consummate leader, Armstrong was lauded by owner Conn Smythe as "the best captain, as a captain, the Leafs have ever had". His 713 career points were the second most all-time in Toronto franchise history at the time of his retirement, and as of 2014 remains fifth-best. His 1,187 NHL games are the most by any player in Toronto history, and he remains the franchise leader with 417 career assists and 713 points by a right wing. The Maple Leafs named him the co-recipient, with Bob Pulford, of the J. P. Bickell Memorial Award in 1959. The award is presented to members of the organization who perform with a high standard of excellence. In 1998, the franchise honoured his uniform number 10. In 2013, he ranked number 14 on Sportsnet's list of the greatest Maple Leafs. Armstrong was inducted into the Hockey Hall of Fame in 1975 and the Ontario Sports Hall of Fame in 2010.

== Personal life ==
Armstrong was a resident in Leaside, a neighbourhood in Toronto, for more than 55 years and often spent time with his family bike riding throughout the area. Aside from his coaching career in professional hockey, Armstrong coached sports teams around his community and contributed his time coaching the first floor hockey team for the Canadian Special Olympics. In Toronto, Beverley Street Public School was the foundation of this floor hockey team.

Armstrong resided in Toronto with his wife Betty. The couple had four children: Brian, Betty-Ann, Fred and Lorne. He was the uncle of Dale McCourt, a former first overall draft pick by the Detroit Red Wings in the 1977 NHL amateur draft. His nephew Dan McCourt, Dale's brother, officiated in excess of 1,700 NHL games.

When given a day with the Stanley Cup in 2005, Armstrong elected to have a family gathering with it at his son's home in Vaughan, Ontario. His granddaughter Kalley was a team captain with the Harvard Crimson women's ice hockey program. She joined Kelly Paton's coaching staff with the Western Mustangs women's ice hockey program in the autumn of 2016. After coaching a girls team in the Little Native Hockey League annual event for First Nation youth in Ontario, in 2019 she started Armstrong Hockey, running annual camps and programs providing hockey development opportunities for Indigenous youth, particularly girls, and working to honour and celebrate her grandfather's legacy in the Indigenous community.

Armstrong was recognized by the NHL for his charitable efforts in 1969 when he was named the inaugural recipient of the Charlie Conacher Humanitarian Award. Proud of his Native heritage, Armstrong often supported programs organized by both Indian and Northern Affairs and non-governmental agencies that aimed to promote positive role models for Native children.

Armstrong had a brief film career, appearing as himself in the 1971 film Face-Off, a.k.a. "Winter Comes Early".

Armstrong died on January 24, 2021, at age 90, having suffered from heart complications in the time leading up to his death. Months later, following a family memorial service, his ashes were buried alongside his mother at Good Shepherd Cemetery, near his birthplace of Skead, Ontario.

== Career statistics ==
=== Playing career ===
			Regular season					Playoffs
Season	Team	League	GP	G	A	Pts	PIM	GP	G	A	Pts	PIM
1946–47	Copper Cliff Redmen	NOJHA	9	6	5	11	4	5	0	1	1	10
1947–48	Stratford Kroehlers	OHA Jr.	36	33	40	73	33	—	—	—	—	—
1948–49	Toronto Marlboros	OHA Jr.	39	29	33	62	89	10	7	10	17	2
1948–49	Toronto Marlboros	OHA Sr.	3	0	0	0	2	10	2	5	7	6
1949–50	Toronto Marlboros	OHA Sr.	45	64	51	115	74	3	0	0	0	0
1949–50	Toronto Maple Leafs	NHL	2	0	0	0	0	—	—	—	—	—
1949–50	Toronto Marlboros	Allan Cup	—	—	—	—	—	17	19	19	38	18
1950–51	Pittsburgh Hornets	AHL	71	15	33	48	49	13	4	9	13	6
1951–52	Pittsburgh Hornets	AHL	50	30	29	59	62	—	—	—	—	—
1951–52	Toronto Maple Leafs	NHL	20	3	3	6	30	4	0	0	0	2
1952–53	Toronto Maple Leafs	NHL	52	14	11	25	54	—	—	—	—	—
1953–54	Toronto Maple Leafs	NHL	63	17	15	32	60	5	1	0	1	2
1954–55	Toronto Maple Leafs	NHL	66	10	18	28	80	4	1	0	1	4
1955–56	Toronto Maple Leafs	NHL	67	16	32	48	97	5	4	2	6	0
1956–57	Toronto Maple Leafs	NHL	54	18	26	44	37	—	—	—	—	—
1957–58	Toronto Maple Leafs	NHL	59	17	25	42	93	—	—	—	—	—
1958–59	Toronto Maple Leafs	NHL	59	20	16	36	37	12	0	4	4	10
1959–60	Toronto Maple Leafs	NHL	70	23	28	51	60	10	1	4	5	4
1960–61	Toronto Maple Leafs	NHL	47	14	19	33	21	5	1	1	2	0
1961–62	Toronto Maple Leafs	NHL	70	21	32	53	27	12	7	5	12	2
1962–63	Toronto Maple Leafs	NHL	70	19	24	43	27	10	3	6	9	4
1963–64	Toronto Maple Leafs	NHL	67 (Note: Some sources (e.g. www.hockey-reference.com) list Armstrong as playing 66 games, for a career total of 1187.)	20	17	37	14	14	5	8	13	10
1964–65	Toronto Maple Leafs	NHL	59	15	22	37	14	6	1	0	1	4
1965–66	Toronto Maple Leafs	NHL	70	16	35	51	12	4	0	1	1	4
1966–67	Toronto Maple Leafs	NHL	70	9	24	33	26	9	2	1	3	6
1967–68	Toronto Maple Leafs	NHL	62	13	21	34	4	—	—	—	—	—
1968–69	Toronto Maple Leafs	NHL	53	11	16	27	10	4	0	0	0	0
1969–70	Toronto Maple Leafs	NHL	49	13	15	28	12	—	—	—	—	—
1970–71	Toronto Maple Leafs	NHL	59	7	18	25	6	6	0	2	2	0
NHL totals			1,188	296	417	713	721	110	26	34	60	52

== Coaching record ==
=== Professional hockey ===
Team	Year	Regular season							Postseason
Team	Year	G	W	L	T	OTL	Pts	Finish	Result
TOR	1988–89	47	17	26	4	—	(62)	5th in Norris	Missed playoffs
Total		47	17	26	4	—	38		0 Stanley Cups (0–0, 0.000)

=== Junior hockey ===
Team	Year	Regular season							Postseason
Team	Year	G	W	L	T	OTL	Pts	Finish	Result
TOR	1972–73	63	47	7	9	—	103	1st in OHA	Won in quarter-finals (8–0 vs. STC); Won in semi-finals (8–0 vs. OTT); Won J. Ross Robertson Cup (8–6 vs. PBO); Finished in 1st in round-robin at Memorial Cup (1–1); Won Memorial Cup (9–1 vs. QUE)
TOR	1973–74	70	30	31	9	—	69	8th in OHA	Won in quarter-finals (9–1 vs. LDN); Lost in semi-finals (0–8 vs. STC)
TOR	1974–75	70	48	13	9	—	105	1st in OMJHL	Won in quarter-finals (9–7 vs. KGN); Won in semi-finals (9–7 vs. SBY); Won J. Ross Robertson Cup (8–6 vs. HAM); Finished in 2nd in round-robin at Memorial Cup (1–1); Won Memorial Cup semi-finals (10–4 vs. SHE); Won Memorial Cup (7–3 vs. NWB)
TOR	1975–76	66	26	30	10	—	62	3rd in Emms	Won in division semi-finals (8–2 vs. LDN); Lost in division finals (1–9 vs. HAM)
TOR	1976–77	66	31	23	12	—	74	3rd in Emms	Lost in division semi-finals (3–9 vs. LDN)
Total		335	182	104	49	—	413		2 J. Ross Robertson Cups (35–28–5, 0.551) 2 Memorial Cups (5–2, 0.714)

== Awards and honours ==
Award	Year	Ref
Red Tilson Trophy	1947–48, 1949–50	
Allan Cup champion	1949–50	
Played in the NHL All-Star Game	1956, 1957, 1959, 1962, 1963, 1964, 1968	
J. P. Bickell Memorial Award	1959	
Stanley Cup champion	1961–62, 1962–63, 1963–64, 1966–67	
Charlie Conacher Humanitarian Award	1968–69	
Memorial Cup champion	1973, 1975 (as coach)	

== See also ==
- List of NHL players who spent their entire career with one franchise

== Bibliography ==
- Downey, Craig; Gogishvili, Aaron; Park, Pat, eds. (2013), 2013–14 Toronto Maple Leafs Media Guide, Toronto Maple Leafs Hockey Club
- Duplacey, James; Zweig, Eric (2010), Official Guide to the Players of the Hockey Hall of Fame, Firefly Books, ISBN 978-1-55407-662-8
- Griggs, Tim; Horton, Lori (1997), In Loving Memory: A Tribute to Tim Horton, ECW Press, ISBN 978-1-55022-319-4
- Marks, Don (2008), They Call Me Chief: Warriors on Ice, J. Gordon Shillingford Publishing Inc., ISBN 978-1-897289-34-1
- Meharg, Bruce (2005), Legends of the Leafs: Toronto's 200 Greatest Hockey Heroes, AuthorHouse, ISBN 978-1-4670-6931-1
- Mortillaro, Nicole (2011), Hockey Trailblazers, Scholastic Canada, ISBN 978-1-4431-0469-2
- Pincus, Arthur (2006), The Official Illustrated NHL History, Reader's Digest, ISBN 0-88850-800-X
- Rogers, Edward; Smith, Donald (1994), Aboriginal Ontario: Historical Perspectives on the First Nations, Dundurn Press Ltd., ISBN 1-55002-209-1

Preceded by Ted Kennedy	Toronto Maple Leafs captain 1958–1969	Succeeded by Dave Keon
Preceded by John Brophy	Head coach of the Toronto Maple Leafs; 1988–1989	Succeeded by Doug Carpenter
