= Big Brothers Big Sisters of Canada =

Charitable youth mentoring organization

- Formation: September 18, 1913; 113 years ago
- Type: Nonprofit
- Legal status: Charity
- Region served: Canada
- Services: Mentoring programs
- National President & CEO: W. Matthew Chater, M.Ed.
- Volunteers: 21,300
- Website: http://bigbrothersbigsisters.ca

Big Brothers Big Sisters of Canada is a non-profit federation charity offering a youth mentoring program, founded in 1913. The Big Brothers Big Sisters movement in Canada provides services to 41,700 youths.

== Programs ==
Big Brothers Big Sisters agencies offer mentoring programs for Canadian youth. In the one-to-one mentoring program, one youth and one adult mentor meet twice a month for at least one year. Big Brothers Big Sisters also operates group mentoring programs for teenagers and clubs.

In 2013, the Boston Consulting Group conducted a research study on the impact of Big Brothers Big Sisters mentoring programs. The study concluded that every dollar spent on Big Brothers Big Sisters results in a $18–23 social return on investment.

== History ==
The youth mentoring movement began in New York in 1904, and, by 1916, Big Brothers had spread to 96 cities across the United States.

In 1912, the first Canadian Big Sister agency was formed in Toronto. In 1913, the first Canadian Big Brother program began in Toronto. In 2001, Big Brothers and Sisters of Canada, Big Sisters of Canada, and Big Sisters Association of Ontario merged to become Big Brothers Big Sisters of Canada.
