= World Hockey Association Hall of Fame =

Hall of Fame honoring World Hockey Association

Coordinates: 47.47145°N 92.52844°W

- Established: 2009
- Founder: Timothy Gassen
- Location: 801 Hat Trick Avenue, Eveleth, Minnesota

The World Hockey Association Hall of Fame is an independent organization dedicated to honoring the World Hockey Association (WHA), which operated from 1972 to 1979 as a major professional ice hockey league. Honourees were inducted in 2010 and 2012.

Officially partnered with the United States Hockey Hall of Fame, the WHA Hall of Fame permanent museum displays are located within the United States Hall of Fame museum in Eveleth, Minnesota, with touring displays made available to be viewed at select locations and for special events.

== Ballots and voting ==
In 2009, the voting ballot, which had been reviewed by members of the Society for International Hockey Research and the president of the International Hockey Hall of Fame, was distributed to former WHA players and personnel, media members, and invited hockey notables. All WHA veterans were eligible for induction.

The inaugural members of the WHA Hall of Fame were announced in 2010, with 41 individual members, plus the Howe Family (Gordie, Marty, Mark, and Colleen Howe were inducted as a family), making up the initial group of inductees. Eight additional individual members were inducted in 2012. The Hall of Fame also includes ten individuals as "Legends of the Game" who are included in recognition of their "significant contributions or career start in the WHA".

== List of members of the WHA Hall of Fame ==
Name	Category	Year elected
Serge Bernier	Forward	2010
Christian Bordeleau	Forward	2012
Réal Cloutier	Forward	2010
Robbie Ftorek	Forward	2010
Anders Hedberg	Forward	2010
Bobby Hull	Forward	2010
Andre Lacroix	Forward	2010
Danny Lawson	Forward	2010
Rich LeDuc	Forward	2012
Larry Lund	Forward	2012
Ulf Nilsson	Forward	2010
Kent Nilsson	Forward	2010
Terry Ruskowski	Forward	2010
Marc Tardif	Forward	2010
Mike Walton	Forward	2010
Tom Webster	Forward	2012
Ted Green	Defenceman	2010
Al Hamilton	Defenceman	2010
Ron Plumb	Defenceman	2010
Rick Ley	Defenceman	2010
Paul Shmyr	Defenceman	2010
Lars-Erik Sjoberg	Defenceman	2010
Pat Stapleton	Defenceman	2010
J. C. Tremblay	Defenceman	2010
Richard Brodeur	Goaltender	2010
Gerry Cheevers	Goaltender	2010
Joe Daley	Goaltender	2010
Ron Grahame	Goaltender	2010
Al Smith	Goaltender	2010
Ernie Wakely	Goaltender	2010
Jacques Demers	Coach	2010
Bill Dineen	Coach	2010
Jack Kelley	Coach	2010
Harry Neale	Coach	2010
Howard Baldwin	Builder	2010
John F. Bassett	Builder	2010
Gary Davidson	Builder	2010
Ben Hatskin	Builder	2010
Bill Hunter	Builder	2010
Dennis Murphy	Builder	2010
Bill Friday	Referee	2012
Mike Gartner	Legend	2012
Michel Goulet	Legend	2012
Wayne Gretzky	Legend	2010
Dave Keon	Legend	2010
Rod Langway	Legend	2012
Frank Mahovlich	Legend	2010
John McKenzie	Legend	2010
Mark Messier	Legend	2010
Jacques Plante	Legend	2010
Glen Sather	Legend	2010
Gordie Howe	The Howe Family	2010
Mark Howe	The Howe Family	2010
Marty Howe	The Howe Family	2010
Colleen Howe	The Howe Family	2010
