= Colleen Howe =

American sports agent (1933–2009)

- Born: Colleen Janet Joffa; February 17, 1933; Sandusky, Michigan, U.S.
- Died: March 6, 2009 (aged 76); Bloomfield Hills, Michigan, U.S.
- Other name: Mrs. Hockey
- Known for: Sports agent for, and wife of Gordie Howe
- Spouse: Gordie Howe (1953–2009, her death)
- Children: 4, including Marty and Mark

Colleen Janet Joffa Howe (February 17, 1933 – March 6, 2009) was a sports agent and political candidate. Howe founded Power Play International and Power Play Publications to manage the business interests of her husband, Hall of Fame ice hockey player Gordie Howe, as well as those of their sons Marty and Mark. She was married to Gordie for 55 years, until her death. As a civic leader, she brought the first Junior A hockey team to the United States, built the first indoor rink for public use in Michigan, and ran for Congress. In 2000, as "Mrs. Hockey", Howe received the Wayne Gretzky International Award, presented to individuals "who have made major contributions to the growth and advancement of hockey in the United States"—from the United States Hockey Hall of Fame, along with her husband (known as "Mr. Hockey") and their two sons Mark and Marty.

== Professional career ==
Howe was one of the founders of the Detroit Junior Red Wings, the first Junior A hockey team in the United States. She served as general manager for three years and formed Power Play International to manage Gordie, Marty and Mark's business interests. She registered her husband's name (Gordie Howe), nickname (Mr. Hockey), and her own nickname (Mrs. Hockey) as trademarks. She was instrumental in the construction of Michigan's first indoor ice hockey rink, named the Gordie Howe Hockeyland arena, located in the Detroit suburb of St. Clair Shores. She was named Sportswoman of the Year in Detroit in 1972, followed by Michigan Sportswoman of the Year in 1973. The Colleen J. Howe Arena in Sandusky, Michigan was named in her honour. The Colleen & Gordie Howe Middle School, Abbotsford, British Columbia, and the Howe Arena in Traverse City, Michigan, are also named in their honour. Howe established the 65-city 65th birthday Gordie Howe tribute tour and the Howe Foundation which supported charities. Howe was also the proud recipient of the Hartford Chamber of Commerce award for outstanding community achievement in 1979.

Her son, Mark Howe was inducted into the U.S. Hockey Hall of Fame 2003. The Howe family—Gordie, Colleen, Mark, and Marty—received the Wayne Gretzky Award in 2000. (Note: Re: Re Howe and U.S. Hockey Hall of Fame Monday, March 9, 2009 10:38 AM From: "Hall Info" info@ushockeyhallmuseum.com Mark Howe was Inducted in 2003. His Family, Gordie, Colleen, Mark and Marty, received the Wayne Gretzky Award in 2000. Mrs. Howe is NOT Inducted in the United States Hockey Hall of Fame Museum, only her son, Mark. (It is frequently—but erroneously—reported that she was inducted into the United States Hockey Hall of Fame. Such reports are probably intended to refer to the Gretzky Award.))

Colleen Howe has stated in an open letter: "Both Gordie and I stem from humble, rural origins. We have been fortunate to see the positive effects hockey has had on our lives, our family’s lives and the lives of millions of others".

Howe's most remarkable negotiation as sports agent occurred in 1973, when she brought Gordie out of retirement and arranged for Mark, Marty, and Gordie to all play together on the Houston Aeros. The three later played together for the Hartford Whalers.

Howe was a candidate in the special Republican primary held in Connecticut's first congressional district in 1981 following the death of William R. Cotter. She lost to former Hartford mayor Ann Uccello.

Colleen Howe is credited with starting the tradition of gifting the wives of professional hockey players a special present after their husbands achieve significant milestones. This tradition began when Colleen gifted a diamond bracelet to the wife of Wayne Gretzky after he surpassed Gordie Howe’s longstanding record for 801 career goals. Gretzky’s wife, Janet, continued the tradition by gifting a present to Alexander Ovechkin’s wife Anastasia Shubskaya after Ovechkin surpassed Gretzky’s record for most career goals in the NHL at 895.

== Family life ==
Colleen Howe was born as Colleen Joffa, an only child, in Sandusky, Michigan. Following her parents' divorce, her mother, along with an aunt and uncle, were responsible for her upbringing. Eventually her mother remarried. During the 1951–52 NHL season (some sources say in 1950), Colleen met her future husband, Gordie Howe, at a Detroit bowling alley, Lucky Strike Lanes, when Gordie was playing for the Detroit Red Wings. They married on April 15, 1953. Gordie Howe is considered one of the greatest ice hockey players of all time.

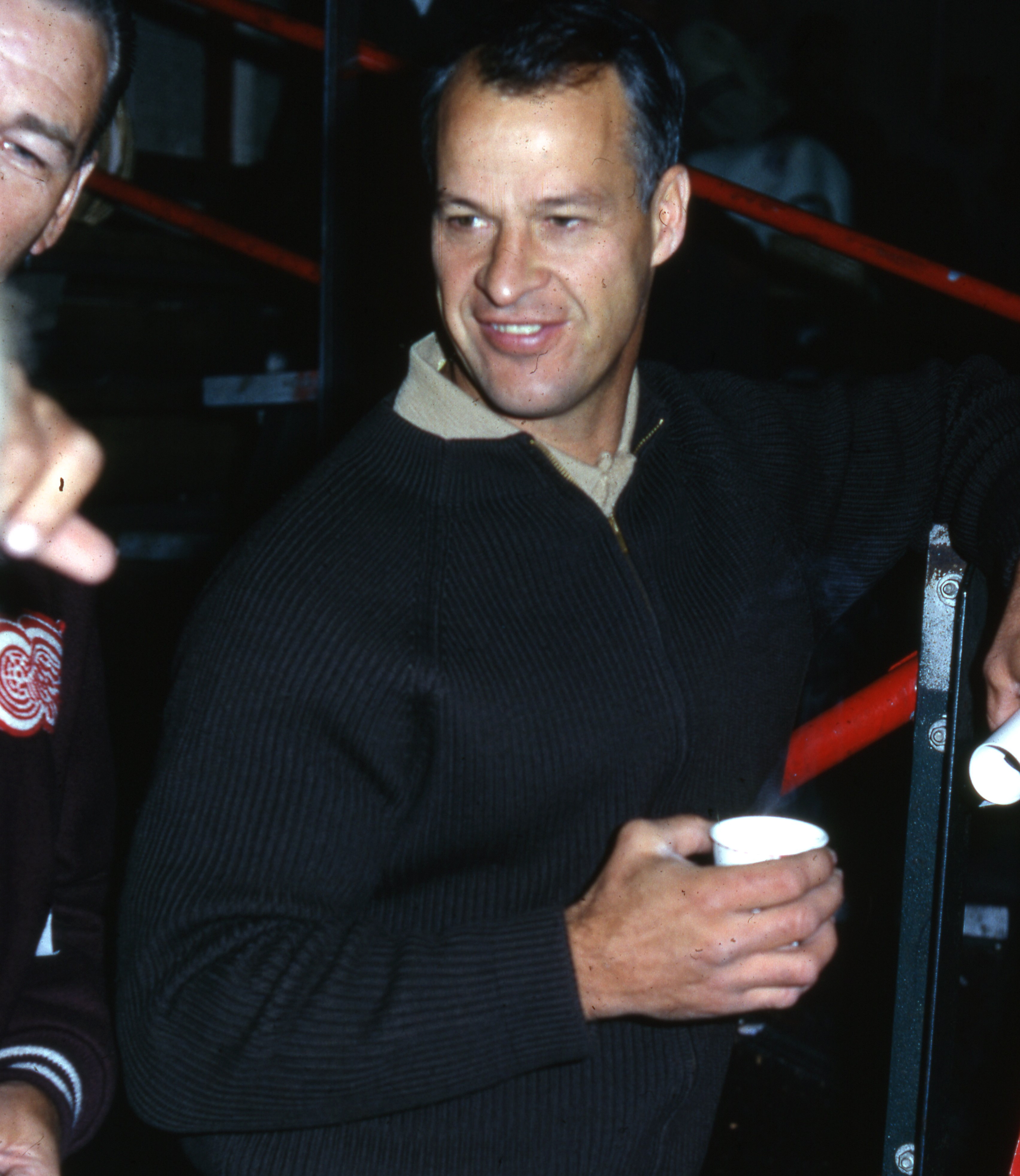
Colleen's husband, Gordie Howe, circa 1966.

The Howes had four children: Marty, Mark, Murray, and Cathy. Mark Howe started his professional hockey career at the age of 18 in the WHA and went on to become a Hall of Fame defenseman in the NHL; he is currently a pro scout for the Detroit Red Wings. Marty Howe played initially for the WHA at 19; he later changed careers and became a home builder and designer. Murray studied medicine and is currently a doctor.

== Later life ==
Howe was diagnosed in 2002 with Pick's disease, an incurable neurological disease that causes dementia and died Friday, March 6, 2009, aged 76, in the family home at Bloomfield Hills, Michigan. Her son, Murray, who diverged from the family's footsteps to become a doctor, helped treat Howe during her ordeal with Pick's disease. Howe is survived by nine grandchildren and one great-grandchild. Red Wings general manager Ken Holland held a moment of silence before the Detroit Red Wings' game against the Columbus Blue Jackets on March 7. When a picture of Howe and Gordie lit up the scoreboard, fans responded with a standing ovation at the Friday, March 6, 2009 Vancouver Giants' game against the Calgary Hitmen at the Pacific Coliseum.

== Publications ==
Colleen Howe wrote the book My Three Hockey Players published in 1975 which became her first venture into writing. The Howes and Charles Wikins collaborated on After the Applause (published in 1989), followed by When the Final Buzzer Sounds (published in 2000). A 20th Century Hockey Chronicle co-written by Howe and Gordie was published in 1994. And ...Howe!: An Authorized Autobiography was written together by the Howes and Tom Delisle and released in 1995. The final joint venture between Howe and Gordie was You Read to Me & I'll Read to You: 20th-Century Stories to Share which came out in print in 2001. Charities were supported by proceeds from the sales of her books.

== Honours ==
In 2010, she was inducted into the World Hockey Association Hall of Fame as a member of “The Howe Family” (including Gordie, Mark, Marty, and Colleen Howe). In 2023, she was named inducted into the Michigan Sports Hall of Fame.

She was portrayed by Kathleen Robertson in the 2013 television film Mr. Hockey: The Gordie Howe Story.
