= 5th National Hockey League All-Star Game =

Professional ice hockey exhibition game

5th NHL All-Star Game
	1	2	3	Total
Second team All-Stars	0	1	1	2
First team All-Stars	1	1	0	2
- Date: October 9, 1951
- Arena: Maple Leaf Gardens
- City: Toronto
- Attendance: 11,469

The 5th National Hockey League All-Star Game took place at Maple Leaf Gardens, home of the Toronto Maple Leafs, on October 9, 1951. Two teams of all-star players played to a 2–2 tie.

== Change in format ==
The format was different from the one before it, largely because due to the nomination of five Detroit Red Wings players to the First and Second Team All-Stars which led to a 7–1 loss the year before. The same critics of the previous format's 7–1 outcome equally lamented the two-all tie in this game, with many suggesting that overtime be implemented.

The new format had the First Team All-Stars and the Second Team All-Stars be the cores of the two teams playing in the all-star game, with the reserves for the First Team consisting of players on American-based teams and the Second Team reserves consisting of Habs and Leafs. Because of the new format, the First Team All-Stars wore the red jerseys worn in previous All-Star Games, while the Second Team wore a white version featuring red and blue stripes and a blue NHL shield.

The 1951 game was held in somewhat of a sombre mood, as Bill Barilko, who had scored the Cup-winning goal for the Leafs, had mysteriously disappeared in a plane accident two months before. Had he been around, he would have been made a member of the Second Team As the All-Star game was symbolic of the start of the season, many new rule changes also had their first looks in this game: the most notable being touch icing: that a defensive player (other than the goaltender) must touch the puck for icing calls (previously, only goaltenders were permitted to touch the puck on icing calls).

Other notable firsts include the first time that the Vezina Trophy winner (Al Rollins) would be absent from the game, as Second Team coach Dick Irvin chose his own player Gerry McNeil, who was in goal when Barilko scored the Cup-winning goal.

== The game ==
=== Summary ===
	First team All-Stars	Second team All-Stars
Final score	2	2
Scoring summary	Howe (Lindsay, Schmidt) 1:59 first (power play); Peirson (Stewart, Raleigh) 16:49 second	Sloan (Watson, Bentley) 2:26 second (power play); Mosdell (Sloan, Mortson) 9:25 third
Penalties	Eddols 10:41 first; Raleigh 1:46 second; Lindsay 1:25 third; Howe 5:53 third	Curry 6:38 first; Sloan 15:58 first
Win/loss	Harry Lumley	Gerry McNeil

- Referee: Bill Chadwick
- Linesmen: Sammy Babcock, Scotty Morrison
- Attendance: 11,469

Source: Podnieks(2000), p. 43.

== Rosters ==
	First team All-Stars	Second team All-Stars
Head coach	Joe Primeau (Toronto Maple Leafs)	Dick Irvin (Montreal Canadiens)
Lineup	First team All-Stars: 1 – G Terry Sawchuk (Detroit Red Wings); 4 – D Red Kelly (Detroit Red Wings); 7 – LW Ted Lindsay (Detroit Red Wings); 9 – RW Gordie Howe (Detroit Red Wings); 11 – D Bill Quackenbush (Boston Bruins); 15 – C Milt Schmidt (Boston Bruins); Reserves: 1 – G Harry Lumley (Chicago Black Hawks); 2 – D Frank Eddolls (New York Rangers); 5 – C Don Raleigh (New York Rangers); 6 – LW Ed Sandford (Boston Bruins); 8 – D Al Dewsbury (Chicago Black Hawks); 12 – LW Doug Bentley (Chicago Black Hawks); 16 – LW Gaye Stewart (New York Rangers); 17 – C Gus Bodnar (Chicago Black Hawks); 20 – D Lee Fogolin Sr. (Chicago Black Hawks); 21 – RW Reg Sinclair (New York Rangers); 23 – RW Johnny Peirson (Boston Bruins)	Second team All-Stars: 1 – G Charlie Rayner (New York Rangers); 2 – D Jimmy Thomson (Toronto Maple Leafs); 5 – D Leo Reise Jr. (Detroit Red Wings); 8 – C Ted Kennedy (Toronto Maple Leafs); 9 – RW Maurice Richard (Montreal Canadiens); 12 – C Sid Abel (Detroit Red Wings); 24 – LW Sid Smith (Toronto Maple Leafs); Reserves: 1 – G Gerry McNeil (Montreal Canadiens); 3 – D Gus Mortson (Toronto Maple Leafs); 4 – LW Harry Watson (Toronto Maple Leafs); 6 – RW Floyd Curry (Montreal Canadiens); 7 – C Max Bentley (Toronto Maple Leafs); 10 – D Doug Harvey (Montreal Canadiens); 11 – D Emile "Butch" Bouchard (Montreal Canadiens); 15 – C Tod Sloan (Toronto Maple Leafs); 18 – C Ken Mosdell (Montreal Canadiens); 20 – LW Paul Meger (Montreal Canadiens)

== See also ==
- 1951–52 NHL season
