= Mark Howe =

Canadian-American ice hockey player (born 1955)

- Hockey Hall of Fame, 2011
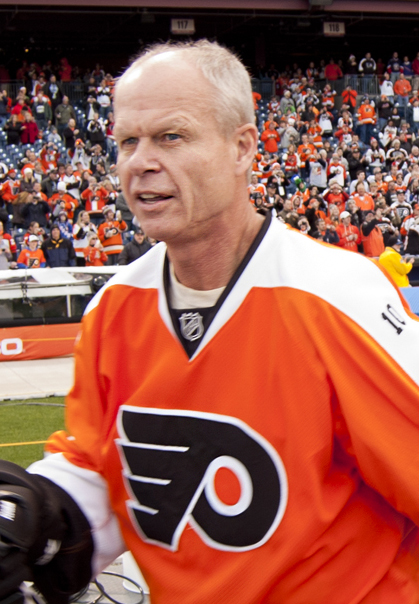
- Howe in 2011
- Born: May 28, 1955 (age 71) Detroit, Michigan, U.S.
- Height: 5 ft 11 in (180 cm)
- Weight: 190 lb (86 kg; 13 st 8 lb)
- Position: Defense / Left wing
- Shot: Left
- Played for: Houston Aeros; Hartford Whalers; Philadelphia Flyers; Detroit Red Wings
- National team: United States
- NHL draft: 25th overall, 1974; Boston Bruins
- Playing career: 1973–1995

Mark Steven Howe (born May 28, 1955) is a Canadian-American former professional ice hockey defenseman and left winger. From 1973 to 1995, he played six seasons in the World Hockey Association (WHA) and sixteen seasons in the National Hockey League (NHL). Howe is the son of Gordie and Colleen Howe, younger brother of Marty Howe, and nephew of Vic Howe. From 1973 to 1980, Mark played alongside his father Gordie and brother Marty. Howe won the Lou Kaplan Trophy for his play as a rookie in 1974 while being named to the WHA All-Star Team three times in his WHA career. In addition to two consecutive Avco World Trophies, Howe was the leading point scorer in the 1975 WHA playoffs with 22 and he had the most points in WHA playoff history with 92.

Despite the enormous shadow cast by his father and splitting time between two leagues, Howe shone as one of the best two-way NHL defensemen of the 1980s, being a three-time runner-up for the Norris Trophy and making the Stanley Cup finals three times as a player. He is a member of the United States Hockey Hall of Fame, and was inducted into the Hockey Hall of Fame in 2011. The Howe family received the Wayne Gretzky International Award in 2000, for major contributions to the growth and advancement of hockey in the United States.

== Amateur career ==
As a youth, Howe played in the 1965 and 1966 Quebec International Pee-Wee Hockey Tournaments along with his brother Marty, on the Detroit Roostertail minor ice hockey team. Howe played junior hockey for the Detroit Jr. Red Wings. As a teenager, he originally had an interest in being a forward just like his father; ironically, one of his junior coaches in Carl Lindstrom told him as a youth that he would make a great defenceman. As a 15-year-old, he led his Red Wings to the US Junior Championship in 1971. In 1972, the United States earned a silver medal at the 1972 Olympics in Sapporo, Japan with 16-year-old Howe being the youngest hockey player to win an Olympic medal in ice hockey history. Howe eventually ended his junior hockey career playing for the Toronto Marlboros of the OHL, winning a Memorial Cup MVP in the process.

== Professional career ==
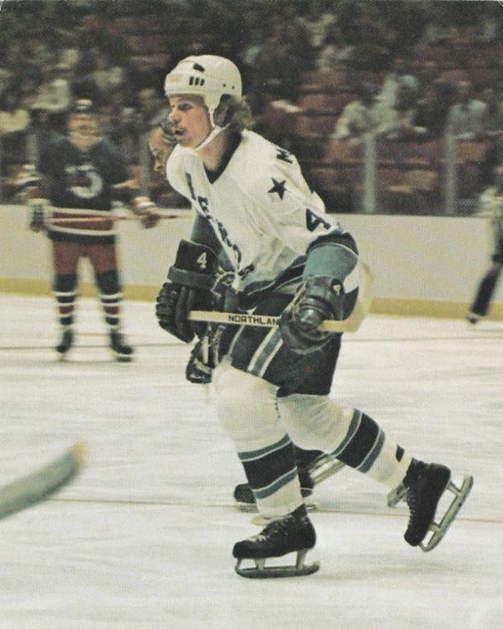
Howe with the Houston Aeros in 1975

In 1973, Howe was approached with an offer for the upstart World Hockey Association with the Houston Aeros. Approached with a four-year offer worth $500,000 with a signing bonus of $125,000, Howe accepted the deal, which saw him paired up not only with his brother Marty but also his father Gordie, the latter of whom came out of retirement to play with his sons. Led by the Howes, the Aeros won the 1974 and 1975 Avco Cups, awarded to the league champions of the WHA. Mark, playing left wing, was awarded the Lou Kaplan Trophy as Rookie of the Year and earned 2nd team All-Star status. Having dual citizenship, he represented his father's country in the 1974 Summit Series, where he was one of Team Canada's leading scorers.

Even though Howe had played a complete season in the WHA, the Boston Bruins proceeded to select him anyway with their second-round pick in the 1974 NHL amateur draft. He was the first active WHA player to be drafted by an NHL team, and the first of three selected in the 1974 draft, the other two being his brother Marty, selected by the Montreal Canadiens in the third round, and Tom Edur of the Cleveland Crusaders, who was also selected by Boston. All three players opted to remain with their WHA teams after the draft.

With the 1976–77 season, Howe was utilized as a defenceman by head coach Bill Dineen for select games due to a litany of injuries suffered by the Aeros. Before the 1977–78 season, the Howes moved their family act to Hartford, Connecticut to play for the New England Whalers.

When the NHL and WHA merged in 1979, one of the four WHA teams left standing were the Whalers, who changed their name to the Hartford Whalers. In the 1979 NHL Expansion Draft, the Boston Bruins, who held his NHL rights, attempted to reclaim Mark Howe; however, the Whalers used a priority selection to retain him. Due to a gentlemen's agreement between the Whalers and the Red Wings, Detroit opted not to exercise their right to reclaim Gordie Howe; the Wings also opted not to reclaim Marty, whose rights they had previously acquired from Montreal. As a result, Mark, his father and his brother were able to play one more season together with the Whalers, this time in the NHL. During that season, Howe was moved over to the defenseman position for the first time in the NHL prior to a December game against the Buffalo Sabres. He ended up with 80 points in 71 games while finishing fifth place in Norris Trophy voting. Howe played the left wing position for the 1980–81 season, which proved to be one of Howe's best. Howe was a mid-season All-Star, and in the fall, he appeared for the US national team at the 1981 Canada Cup tournament. It was his last as a full-time left winger before moving to defenceman on a permanent basis.

Howe was involved in one of the more memorable injuries in NHL history. On December 27, 1980, he slid into the pointed metal center of the net and cut a five-inch gash in his rectal area. He was essentially impaled in an injury that nearly ended his career. Following a lawsuit by Howe, the NHL changed the design of its nets so that there would no longer be a center portion that jutted up toward the goal line. He lost 21 pounds and his stamina suffered after requiring a liquid diet to avoid intestinal infections. After Whalers management lost faith in Howe, he requested a trade, and was moved in a four-player deal that also involved draft picks, to the Philadelphia Flyers.

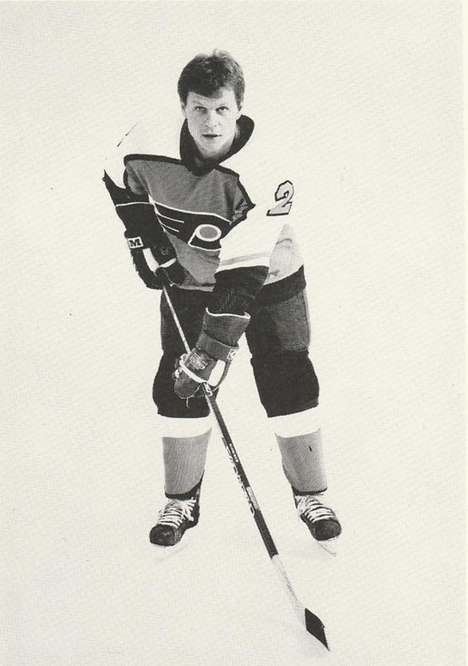
Howe with the Philadelphia Flyers in 1983

The backbone of one of the NHL's best defensive teams of the mid-1980s, Howe was a finalist for the Norris Trophy three times, those being in 1982–83, 1985–86 and 1986–87 season. Howe credited the advice of former Flyers player Ed Van Impe (who advised him to play within the system along with being aware of opposing forwards and trusting teammates) and also being able to watch the games on television (at the time, Philadelphia had more games on television than Hartford, albeit late at night). His Philadelphia team, backstopped by Vezina Trophy-winning goaltender Pelle Lindbergh, finished the 1984–85 season with most points and earned a berth in the Stanley Cup Final, only to lose to the Edmonton Oilers' dynasty, which featured stars such as Wayne Gretzky, Paul Coffey and Mark Messier.

Howe had his best season during the 1985–86 season where he posted some of the best numbers ever by an NHL defenseman, in particular, leading the NHL with a remarkable +85 Plus/Minus rating and 7 shorthanded goals. He scored 24 goals, added 58 assists for 82 total points while being the lifeline out of the Flyers defensive zone with his outstanding skating and passing abilities. Unfortunately for Howe, Paul Coffey had perhaps one of the best seasons by a defenseman in NHL history, breaking Bobby Orr's single-season records for goals with 48, and tallying 138 points. Howe, for the second time, finished runner-up in Norris Trophy voting.

The 1986–87 season brought great success to both Howe and his Philadelphia Flyers teammates. The Flyers, for the third consecutive season, led the Prince of Wales Conference in points. Led by Howe and defense partner Brad McCrimmon, rookie netminder Ron Hextall, and a line featuring Brian Propp, Rick Tocchet and Pelle Eklund, the injury-riddled Flyers took the vaunted Edmonton Oilers to 7 games in the NHL Finals before succumbing 3–1 in the finale.

From 1979 to 1988 for the position of defenceman, Howe was third in points and plus-minus.

After the 1991–92 season, the Flyers granted Howe free agency. Seeking to play for a contender to win the Cup, Howe had four teams in mind: the Pittsburgh Penguins, New York Rangers, New Jersey Devils and the Detroit Red Wings. Pittsburgh (who he labeled as wanting to play for the most) did not return his call so he shifted his interest with the "next choice" with Detroit that had appeal to him with the talent present. The 1994–95 season saw him play in eighteen games for six total points as the Red Wings appeared in the Stanley Cup Final, which they lost to the New Jersey Devils in four games.

== Post-playing career ==
Upon his retirement as a player following the 1994–95 season, Howe remained in the Detroit organization working in the hockey operations department, first as a video coach and then as a pro scout, earning Stanley Cup rings when the Wings captured championships in 1997, 1998, 2002, and 2008. He became the Director of Pro Scouting that would primarily cover NHL and AHL teams located in the eastern United States that was close to his home in Jackson, New Jersey. Howe's older son, Travis, also works in the hockey development and coaching field as co-founder and head coach of the Selects Hockey player development program based in Bloomfield, Michigan. When asked about the capabilities of what the scouting entailed in a 2021 interview, Howe related the following:

Basically your job is to know that player, know their capabilities, and part of that is knowing your team as well, so where would that player fit into the plans of the team that you’re working for, and you get a feel. And it’s not just can he skate good, can he pass the puck good? It’s, what’s their feel for the game, what’s their compete level? They all factor into, I think, your decision-making, and with the Red Wings (currently) it’s been that way for a few years now — we knew that things were going to be headed downhill and it was going to be a rebuild. So, much of your decision is based on, whether you’re making a trade or whatever, what edge can we get that’ll help us down the road? Maybe (they’ll) help us a little bit now, but more for the future than it was for present day. So whereas in the past, you go back 20 years ago, and we just needed somebody that could help us now.

You take the trade for Chris Chelios, when we originally acquired him, the talk was, can he play for four years? And everybody that was in that office making that decision, everybody voted yes. And thankfully Chris played another 10 years. But I mean, those decisions were you give up some assets to try and keep your team strong, and any time you acquire a guy or two and those decisions roll into Stanley Cups, they’re always worth it. But there’s always a price to pay for giving up future assets. But if your team’s in a position where you can win a Cup, you know you work for years and years and years to get to that position. And it’s hard not to give the players that are in that locker room the best opportunity to win.

At the conclusion of the 2020–21 season, Howe retired from Detroit Red Wings, concluding 48 total professional seasons as either a player or as a scout.

== Personal life ==
Howe had three children with his first wife Ginger.

== Legacy ==
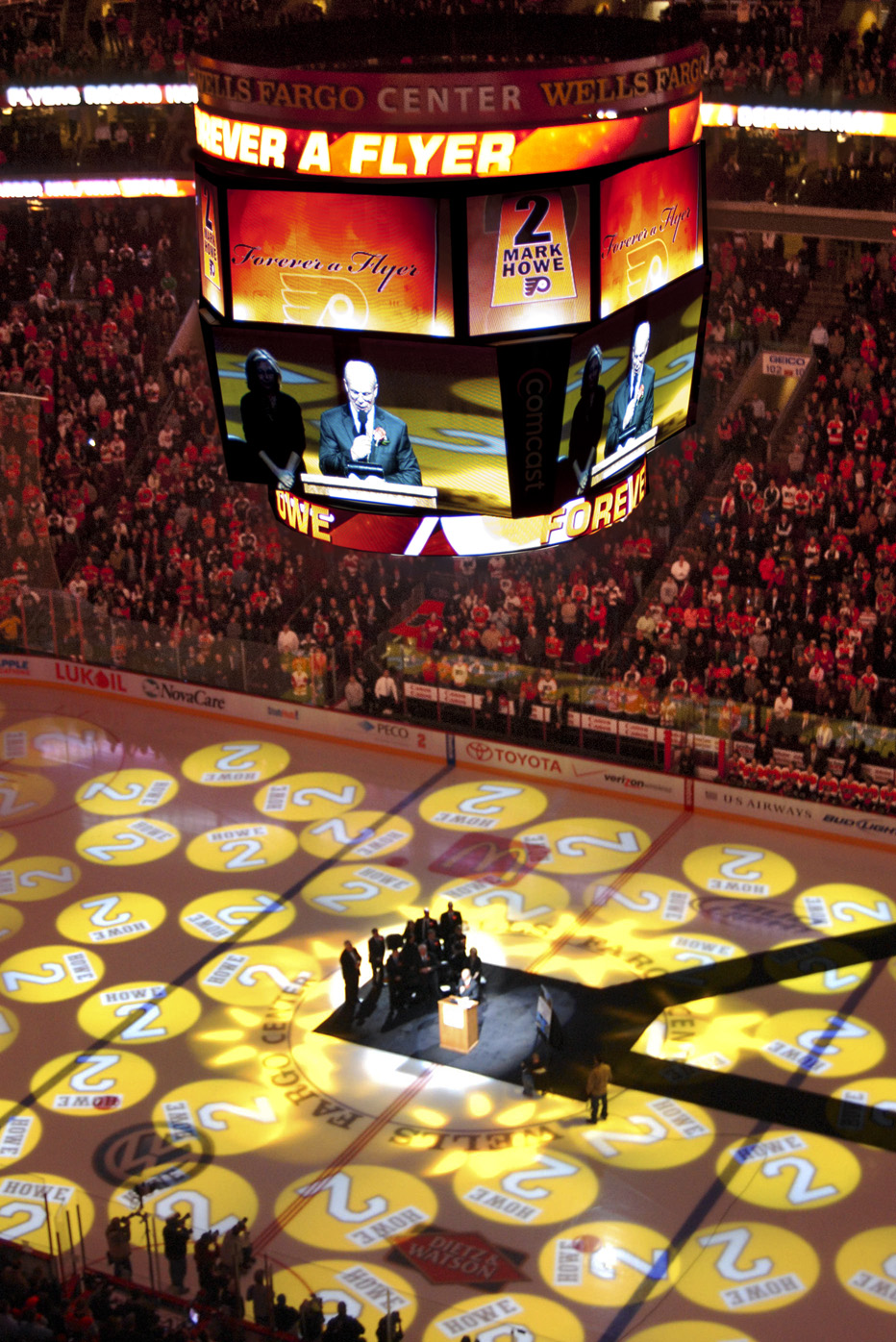
Mark Howe speaking at the retirement of his number (2) by the Philadelphia Flyers.

Upon his retirement, Howe was the last active Houston Aeros or New England Whalers player in the NHL, as well as the last active member of Canada's 1974 Summit Series team. In the WHA and NHL, Howe recorded 405 goals and 1,246 points. Howe was elected to the Philadelphia Flyers Hall of Fame in 2001 and the United States Hockey Hall of Fame in 2003. In June 2011, it was announced that Howe had been elected to the Hockey Hall of Fame to which he was inducted on November 14, 2011, in the players' category; he and his father Gordie were the second father-son combination in hockey history to be named to the Hall of Fame, behind Bobby and Brett Hull.

On March 6, 2012, the Philadelphia Flyers retired Mark Howe's #2 jersey in an on-ice ceremony at the Wells Fargo Center before a game with the Detroit Red Wings. Howe's number became only the fifth number to be retired by the Flyers in the club's then 44-season history following those of Bernie Parent (1), Bobby Clarke (16), Bill Barber (7) and the late Barry Ashbee (4). He was also the first to be so honoured by the club since Barber's jersey was retired on October 11, 1990. With the retirement of Mark Howe's number 2 by the Flyers, Mark and Gordie Howe became only the second father-and-son combinations (Bobby and Brett Hull being the other) to have their numbers retired by NHL franchises. Howe also has won over 26 international awards. In 2022, The Athletic named Howe as the 93rd best player of the modern NHL era.

== Awards and achievements ==
- OJHL First All-Star Team (1971)
- Stafford Smythe Memorial Trophy (Memorial Cup Tournament MVP) (1973)
- WHA Second All-Star Team (1974)
- Lou Kaplan Trophy (Rookie of the Year – WHA) (1974)
- WHA Avco Cup Trophy (1974, 1975)
- WHA First All-Star Team (1979)
- NHL First All-Star Team (1983, 1986, 1987)
- NHL Plus/Minus Award (1986) (+85)
- Selected to five NHL All-Star Games: 1981, 1983, 1986, 1988 and 1994
- In 2010, he was inducted into the World Hockey Association Hall of Fame as a member of "The Howe Family" (including Gordie, Mark, Marty, and Colleen Howe).
- NHL career leader for shorthanded goals scored by a defenseman (tied for 29th overall among all players) with 28.

=== NHL Records ===
- Most career short-handed goals by a defenseman: (28)
- Highest Plus/Minus in a season by a U.S. born defenseman: (+87) in 1985–86
- Highest Plus/Minus career by a U.S. born defenseman: (+400)
- Highest Plus/Minus career in playoffs by a U.S. born defenseman: (+54)
- Most assists by a rookie U.S. born defenseman in a season: (56)
- Most points by a rookie U.S. born defenseman in a season: (80)
- Most short-handed goals in a season by a U.S. born defenseman: (7) in 1985–86

== Career statistics ==
=== Regular season and playoffs ===
			Regular season					Playoffs
Season	Team	League	GP	G	A	Pts	PIM	GP	G	A	Pts	PIM
1969–70	Detroit Olympia	MNHL	40	30	39	69	21	—	—	—	—	—
1970–71	Detroit Jr. Red Wings	SOJHL	44	37	70	107	—	—	—	—	—	—
1970–71	Detroit Jr. Red Wings	Cen-Cup	—	—	—	—	—	10	5	19	24	0
1971–72	Detroit Jr. Red Wings	SOJHL	9	5	9	14	—	—	—	—	—	—
1972–73	Toronto Marlboros	OHA-Jr.	60	38	66	104	27	—	—	—	—	—
1972–73	Toronto Marlboros	M-Cup	—	—	—	—	—	3	4	4	8	6
1973–74	Houston Aeros	WHA	76	38	41	79	20	14	9	10	19	4
1974–75	Houston Aeros	WHA	74	36	40	76	30	13	10	12	22	0
1975–76	Houston Aeros	WHA	72	39	37	76	38	17	6	10	16	18
1976–77	Houston Aeros	WHA	57	23	52	75	46	11	4	10	14	2
1977–78	New England Whalers	WHA	70	30	61	91	32	14	8	7	15	18
1978–79	New England Whalers	WHA	77	42	65	107	32	6	4	2	6	6
1979–80	Hartford Whalers	NHL	74	24	56	80	20	3	1	2	3	2
1980–81	Hartford Whalers	NHL	63	19	46	65	54	—	—	—	—	—
1981–82	Hartford Whalers	NHL	76	8	45	53	18	—	—	—	—	—
1982–83	Philadelphia Flyers	NHL	76	20	47	67	18	3	0	2	2	4
1983–84	Philadelphia Flyers	NHL	71	19	34	53	44	3	0	0	0	2
1984–85	Philadelphia Flyers	NHL	73	18	39	57	31	19	3	8	11	6
1985–86	Philadelphia Flyers	NHL	77	24	58	82	36	5	0	4	4	0
1986–87	Philadelphia Flyers	NHL	69	15	43	58	37	26	2	10	12	4
1987–88	Philadelphia Flyers	NHL	75	19	43	62	62	7	3	6	9	4
1988–89	Philadelphia Flyers	NHL	52	9	29	38	45	19	0	15	15	10
1989–90	Philadelphia Flyers	NHL	40	7	21	28	24	—	—	—	—	—
1990–91	Philadelphia Flyers	NHL	19	0	10	10	8	—	—	—	—	—
1991–92	Philadelphia Flyers	NHL	42	7	18	25	18	—	—	—	—	—
1992–93	Detroit Red Wings	NHL	60	3	31	34	22	7	1	3	4	2
1993–94	Detroit Red Wings	NHL	44	4	20	24	8	6	0	1	1	0
1994–95	Detroit Red Wings	NHL	18	1	5	6	10	3	0	0	0	0
WHA totals			426	208	296	504	198	75	41	51	92	48
NHL totals			929	197	545	742	455	101	10	51	61	34

=== International ===
Medal record

Men's ice hockey

Representing United States

Olympic Games
Silver medal – second place	1972 Sapporo	Team

Year	Team	Event	GP	G	A	Pts	PIM
1972	United States	OG	6	0	0	0	0
1974	Canada	Summit-74	7	2	4	6	4
1981	United States	CC	6	0	4	4	2
Senior totals			19	2	8	10	6

== See also ==
- List of members of the United States Hockey Hall of Fame

Preceded by Pelle Lindbergh	Winner of the Bobby Clarke Trophy; 1986	Succeeded by Ron Hextall
Preceded by Wayne Gretzky	Winner of the NHL Plus/Minus Award; 1986	Succeeded by Wayne Gretzky
