= Vic Howe =

Canadian ice hockey player

- Born: November 2, 1929 Saskatoon, Saskatchewan, Canada
- Died: January 31, 2015 (aged 85) Moncton, New Brunswick, Canada
- Height: 6 ft 0 in (183 cm)
- Weight: 172 lb (78 kg; 12 st 4 lb)
- Position: Right Wing
- Shot: Right
- Played for: New York Rangers
- Playing career: 1948–1957

Victor Stanley Howe (November 2, 1929 – January 31, 2015) was a Canadian professional ice hockey right wing. He played 33 games in the National Hockey League with the New York Rangers between 1951 and 1955. The rest of his career, which lasted from 1948 to 1957, was spent in various minor leagues. Howe's brother, Gordie, and nephews Mark and Marty all played in the NHL as well; both Gordie and Mark are in the Hockey Hall of Fame.

== Life and career ==
Howe was born to Ab and Katherine Howe as one of nine children. He was raised in Saskatoon and played most of his career in the minor leagues, and played 33 games in the National Hockey League over three seasons in the 1950s.

Howe retired after the 1956–57 season in the British National League, but returned to hockey for the 1961–62 season with the Moncton Beavers of the Nova Scotia Senior Hockey League, a senior league in New Brunswick.

== Post-playing career ==
Howe retired from hockey in 1957 to work as a constable with the Canadian National Railway Police in Moncton, New Brunswick. He died on January 31, 2015.

Howe retired from CN and lived in Moncton until his death. He was predeceased by wife Jaquie (2007) and daughter Vicki (2014), as well as two brothers and three sisters. He was survived by brother Gordie and sister Helen Cummine of Saskatoon.

== Career statistics ==
=== Regular season and playoffs ===
			Regular season					Playoffs
Season	Team	League	GP	G	A	Pts	PIM	GP	G	A	Pts	PIM
1946–47	King George High School	HS-CA	—	—	—	—	—	—	—	—	—	—
1947–48	Saskatoon Tech	SJRHL	—	—	—	—	—	—	—	—	—	—
1947–48	Saskatoon Quakers	WCSHL	—	—	—	—	—	2	2	1	3	4
1948–49	Windsor Hettche Spitfires	IHL	31	16	14	30	17	—	—	—	—	—
1949–50	Windsor Spitfires	OHA	41	9	11	20	15	11	2	6	8	6
1950–51	New York Rovers	EHL	53	15	24	39	55	5	1	3	4	2
1950–51	New York Rangers	NHL	3	1	0	1	2	—	—	—	—	—
1951–52	New York Rovers	EHL	59	21	34	55	15	—	—	—	—	—
1951–52	Cincinnati Mohawks	AHL	2	0	1	1	0	—	—	—	—	—
1952–53	Troy Uncle Sam's Trojans	EHL	59	27	52	79	23	—	—	—	—	—
1952–53	Saskatoon Quakers	WHL	1	0	0	0	2	—	—	—	—	—
1953–54	Saskatoon Quakers	WHL	65	15	23	38	35	6	0	2	2	0
1953–54	New York Rangers	NHL	1	0	0	0	0	—	—	—	—	—
1954–55	Valleyfield Braves	QSHL	6	1	1	2	4	—	—	—	—	—
1954–55	Saskatoon Quakers/Vancouver Canucks	WHL	22	3	6	9	2	—	—	—	—	—
1954–55	New York Rangers	NHL	29	2	4	6	10	—	—	—	—	—
1955–56	Regina/Brandon Regals	WHL	3	0	0	0	0	—	—	—	—	—
1956–57	Harringay Racers	BNL	45	26	26	52	32	—	—	—	—	—
1961–62	Moncton Beavers	NSSHL	33	19	30	49	10	11	4	8	12	4
1965–66	Moncton Hawks	Exhib	—	—	—	—	—	7	3	4	7	2
NHL totals			33	3	4	7	10	—	—	—	—	—
