= Marty Howe =

Canadian-American ice hockey player

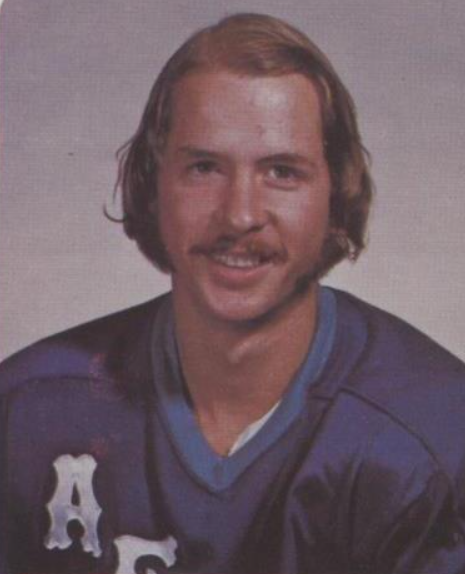
- Howe in 1975
- Born: February 18, 1954 (age 72) Detroit, Michigan, U.S.
- Height: 6 ft 1 in (185 cm)
- Weight: 195 lb (88 kg; 13 st 13 lb)
- Position: Defense
- Shot: Left
- Played for: Houston Aeros; New England Whalers; Boston Bruins; Hartford Whalers
- National team: Canada
- NHL draft: 51st overall, 1974; Montreal Canadiens
- Playing career: 1973–1985

Marty Gordon Howe (born February 18, 1954) is a Canadian-American former professional ice hockey defenseman. Howe was drafted in the third round, 51st overall in the 1974 NHL entry draft by the Montreal Canadiens. He elected to play for the Houston Aeros of the World Hockey Association (WHA) in 1973, where he played with his father and brother for four seasons. From 2001 to 2006, he was an assistant coach for the Chicago Wolves of the AHL. He is the son of Colleen and Gordie Howe, older brother of Mark Howe, and nephew of Vic Howe. Howe now lives with his wife Mary in Glastonbury, Connecticut.

== Playing career ==
As a youth, Howe played in the 1965 and 1966 Quebec International Pee-Wee Hockey Tournaments along with his brother Mark, on the Detroit Roostertail minor ice hockey team. He started his junior career with the Toronto Marlboros of the OHA (now the OHL). In 1973, he chose to join his father Gordie and brother Mark to play with the Houston Aeros of the World Hockey Association (WHA). Even though he was drafted by the Canadiens in 1974, he did not play in the National Hockey League (NHL) until 1979, when the WHA joined the NHL.

== Career statistics ==
=== Regular season and playoffs ===
			Regular season					Playoffs
Season	Team	League	GP	G	A	Pts	PIM	GP	G	A	Pts	PIM
1970–71	Detroit Jr. Red Wings	SOJHL
1970–71	Detroit Jr. Red Wings	CC	—	—	—	—	—	12	1	9	10	18
1971–72	Toronto Marlboros	OHA-Jr.	56	7	21	28	122	10	1	8	9	38
1972–73	Toronto Marlboros	OHA-Jr.	38	11	17	28	81	—	—	—	—	—
1972–73	Toronto Marlboros	MC	—	—	—	—	—	3	0	1	1	0
1973–74	Houston Aeros	WHA	73	4	20	24	90	14	1	5	6	31
1974–75	Houston Aeros	WHA	75	13	21	34	89	11	0	2	2	11
1975–76	Houston Aeros	WHA	80	14	23	37	81	16	4	4	8	12
1976–77	Houston Aeros	WHA	80	17	28	45	103	11	3	1	4	10
1977–78	New England Whalers	WHA	75	10	10	20	66	14	1	1	2	13
1978–79	New England Whalers	WHA	66	9	15	24	31	9	0	1	1	8
1979–80	Hartford Whalers	NHL	6	0	1	1	4	3	1	1	2	0
1979–80	Springfield Indians	AHL	31	8	5	13	12	—	—	—	—	—
1980–81	Hartford Whalers	NHL	12	0	1	1	25	—	—	—	—	—
1980–81	Binghamton Whalers	AHL	37	4	10	14	34	6	0	2	2	6
1981–82	Hartford Whalers	NHL	13	0	4	4	2	—	—	—	—	—
1981–82	Binghamton Whalers	AHL	61	8	38	46	42	15	0	8	8	4
1982–83	Boston Bruins	NHL	78	1	11	12	24	12	0	1	1	9
1983–84	Hartford Whalers	NHL	69	0	11	11	34	—	—	—	—	—
1984–85	Hartford Whalers	NHL	19	1	1	2	10	—	—	—	—	—
1984–85	Binghamton Whalers	AHL	44	7	12	19	22	8	3	2	5	6
1992–93	Flint Bulldogs	CoHL	3	0	1	1	4	—	—	—	—	—
WHA totals			449	67	117	184	460	75	9	14	23	85
NHL totals			197	2	29	31	99	15	1	2	3	9
AHL totals			173	27	65	92	110	29	3	12	15	16

=== International ===
Year	Team	Event	GP	G	A	Pts	PIM
1974	Canada	SS	4	0	1	1	10

== Awards and accomplishments ==
- SOJHL All-Star Second Team: 1970–71 (Detroit)
- Played in 1976 WHA All-Star Game
- In 2000, the Howe family received the Wayne Gretzky International Award, for major contributions to the growth and advancement of hockey in the United States.
- In 2010, he was inducted into the World Hockey Association Hall of Fame as a member of "The Howe Family" (including Gordie, Mark, Marty, and Colleen Howe).

== International play ==
Although Marty Howe was born and raised in Detroit, Michigan he never represented the United States in international hockey. Having dual citizenship, his only international appearance was as a member of Team Canada during the 1974 Summit Series versus the Soviet Union.

== See also ==
- Notable families in the NHL
