= Floral, Saskatchewan =

Coordinates: 52°03′25″N 106°30′40″W

Floral
- Unincorporated community
- Location within Saskatchewan
- Country: Canada
- Province: Saskatchewan
- Rural Municipality: Corman Park No. 344
- Post office opened: June 1, 1905

Floral, Saskatchewan is an unincorporated community in the province of Saskatchewan, Canada.

Floral is part of the Rural Municipality of Corman Park No. 344 (R.M. of Corman Park). The R.M. of Corman Park surrounds the city of Saskatoon, and Floral is southeast of the city limits of Saskatoon, beyond the southeast corner of the shared R.M. of Corman Park - Saskatoon Planning District. Floral lies east of Highway 11/Louis Riel Trail, along east-west Floral Road/Township Road 360, generally between north-south Range Roads 3041 and 3044, on land that is now bisected by Highway 16/Yellowhead Highway.

The post office at Floral operated from June 1, 1905, to October 31, 1923. Floral had a grain elevator, built in 1927 and demolished in 2003. The Floral Cemetery and dormant church building are on Floral Road, between Range Roads 3043 and 3044.

Floral is home to one of the seven community centres within the R.M. of Corman Park, located on Floral Road east of Range Road 3044 and west of the Floral Cemetery. The Floral Community Centre occupies the former one room school house of Floral School District #688, in the Southwest Quarter of Section 4, Township 36, Range 4 west of the Third Meridian (SW-4-36-4-W3), complete with adjacent sports fields.

The Prairie Swine Centre, a non-profit research and technology centre partnered with industry and governments across Canada, is located on Floral Road east of the Floral Cemetery and east of Range Road 3043.

The original 1905 Floral Post Office was located on this same Section 4, but later moved to a building closer to Range Road 3041 in Section 2.

Floral was the birthplace of National Hockey League ice hockey player Gordie Howe.
