= Wayne Gretzky International Award =

Lifetime achievement award given by the United States Hockey Hall of Fame

The Wayne Gretzky International Award is a lifetime achievement award given by the United States Hockey Hall of Fame. It was established in 1999, to honor international individuals who have made major contributions to the growth and advancement of ice hockey in the United States. The award is special recognition for contributions by those not inducted into the Hall of Fame. It was first presented to its namesake Wayne Gretzky, and has been subsequently awarded at the Hall of Fame induction ceremony.

== Recipients ==
Year	Recipients	Nationality	Notes
1999	Wayne Gretzky	Canadian	
2000	The Howe family Gordie, Colleen, Mark & Marty	Canadian / American	
2001	Scotty Morrison	Canadian	
2002	Scotty Bowman	Canadian	
2003	Bobby Hull	Canadian	
2004	Herb Brooks	American	
2008	Anatoly Tarasov	Russian	
2012	Murray Costello	Canadian	
2015	Emile Francis	Canadian	
2019	Alexander Ovechkin	Russian	
