= Lou Kaplan Trophy =

The Lou Kaplan Trophy was presented annually to the World Hockey Association's (WHA) rookie of the year. Terry Caffery won the first award.

== History ==
Lou Kaplan was one of the original owners of the Minnesota Fighting Saints of the WHA. On August 10, 1973, the WHA officially named its trophies after the team officials at the WHA's founding meeting in 1972. The rookie-of-the-year trophy was named after Kaplan.

== Winners ==
- 1973 – Terry Caffery, New England Whalers
- 1974 – Mark Howe, Houston Aeros
- 1975 – Anders Hedberg, Winnipeg Jets
- 1976 – Mark Napier, Toronto Toros
- 1977 – George Lyle, New England Whalers
- 1978 – Kent Nilsson, Winnipeg Jets
- 1979 – Wayne Gretzky, Edmonton Oilers
