= Glenn Goldup =

Canadian ice hockey player

- Born: April 26, 1953 (age 73) Toronto, Ontario, Canada
- Height: 6 ft 0 in (183 cm)
- Weight: 190 lb (86 kg; 13 st 8 lb)
- Position: Right wing
- Shot: Left
- Played for: Montreal Canadiens; Los Angeles Kings
- NHL draft: 17th overall, 1973; Montreal Canadiens
- WHA draft: 2nd overall, 1973; New England Whalers
- Playing career: 1974–1984

Glenn Michael Goldup (born April 26, 1953) is a Canadian former professional ice hockey player who played 291 games in the National Hockey League (NHL). He played for the Montreal Canadiens and Los Angeles Kings from 1973 to 1981. As a youth, he played in the 1965 Quebec International Pee-Wee Hockey Tournament with the Toronto Torrids minor ice hockey team. Born in Toronto, Ontario, his father Hank Goldup also played professional hockey in the NHL.

== Career statistics ==
=== Regular season and playoffs ===
			Regular season					Playoffs
Season	Team	League	GP	G	A	Pts	PIM	GP	G	A	Pts	PIM
1968–69	Toronto Marlboros	OHA	35	20	20	40	—	—	—	—	—	—
1969–70	Toronto Marlboros	OHA	2	0	1	1	0	14	4	5	9	9
1969–70	Markham Waxers	MetJBHL	27	22	19	41	—	—	—	—	—	—
1970–71	Toronto Marlboros	OHA	58	12	22	34	82	14	2	1	3	16
1971–72	Toronto Marlboros	OHA	63	24	34	58	161	10	2	2	4	30
1972–73	Toronto Marlboros	OHA	54	42	53	95	193	16	7	11	18	—
1972–73	Toronto Marlboros	M-Cup	—	—	—	—	—	3	3	2	5	2
1973–74	Montreal Canadiens	NHL	6	0	0	0	0	—	—	—	—	—
1973–74	Nova Scotia Voyageurs	AHL	44	18	15	33	64	—	—	—	—	—
1974–75	Montreal Canadiens	NHL	9	0	1	1	2	—	—	—	—	—
1974–75	Nova Scotia Voyageurs	AHL	49	15	16	31	140	5	1	4	5	36
1975–76	Montreal Canadiens	NHL	3	0	0	0	2	—	—	—	—	—
1975–76	Nova Scotia Voyageurs	AHL	65	23	22	45	131	9	8	3	11	33
1976–77	Los Angeles Kings	NHL	28	7	6	13	29	8	2	2	4	2
1976–77	Fort Worth Texans	CHL	7	2	2	4	9	—	—	—	—	—
1977–78	Los Angeles Kings	NHL	66	14	18	32	66	2	1	0	1	11
1978–79	Los Angeles Kings	NHL	73	15	22	37	89	2	0	1	1	9
1979–80	Los Angeles Kings	NHL	55	10	11	21	78	4	1	0	1	0
1980–81	Los Angeles Kings	NHL	49	6	9	15	35	—	—	—	—	—
1980–81	New Haven Nighthawks	AHL	15	6	2	8	36	3	0	0	0	0
1981–82	Los Angeles Kings	NHL	2	0	0	0	2	—	—	—	—	—
1981–82	New Haven Nighthawks	AHL	51	14	17	31	91	4	3	1	4	2
1982–83	New Haven Nighthawks	AHL	28	0	8	8	39	—	—	—	—	—
1983–84	New Haven Nighthawks	AHL	1	0	0	0	0	—	—	—	—	—
AHL totals			253	76	80	156	501	21	12	8	20	71
NHL totals			291	52	67	119	303	16	4	3	7	22

Preceded by None	New England Whalers first-round draft pick 1973	Succeeded by Blake Dunlop
