= 1973 Memorial Cup =

Canadian junior men's ice hockey championship

Tournament details
- Venue(s): Montreal Forum (Montreal, Quebec)
- Dates: May 7–12, 1973
- Teams: 3

Final positions
- Champions: Toronto Marlboros (OHA) (6th title)

The Memorial Cup trophy

The 1973 Memorial Cup occurred May 7–12 at the Montreal Forum in Montreal, Quebec. It was the 55th annual Memorial Cup competition, organized by the Canadian Amateur Hockey Association (CAHA) to determine the champion of major junior A ice hockey. Participating teams were the winners of the Ontario Hockey Association, Quebec Major Junior Hockey League and Western Hockey League which were the Toronto Marlboros, Quebec Remparts and Medicine Hat Tigers. Toronto won their 6th Memorial Cup, defeating Quebec in the final game.

== Teams ==
QMJHL Team OHA Team WCHL Team Host City

=== Medicine Hat Tigers ===
The Medicine Hat Tigers represented the Western Canada Hockey League at the 1973 Memorial Cup. The Tigers had a very solid regular season during 1972-73, earning a record of 39-20-9 for 87 points, and second place in the West Division. Medicine Hat was the highest scoring team in the WCHL, scoring 348 goals. Defensively, the Tigers allowed the fourth fewest goals against at 254. In the West Division semi-finals, the Tigers defeated the Calgary Centennials four games to two. In the West Division finals, the Tigers defeated the defending WCHL champions, the Edmonton Oil Kings, four games to two. The Tigers faced the Regina Pats for the President's Cup, and Medicine Hat defeated Regina three games to zero, as well as two games ending in a tie, to win the league championship and a berth at the 1973 Memorial Cup tournament.

The Tigers offense was led by Tom Lysiak, who led the league with 154 points, as he scored 56 goals and 98 assists in 67 games. Lysiak was awarded the Brownridge Trophy for leading the league in points. In 17 playoff games, Lysiak scored 12 goals and a team high 39 points. Lanny McDonald scored 62 goals and 139 points in 68 games to finish third in league scoring. His 62 goals led the Tigers and was the third highest total in the WCHL. In the playoffs, McDonald led the Tigers with 18 goals and his 37 points were second on the team. Boyd Anderson scored 48 goals and 112 points in 68 games and Ed Johnstone scored 58 goals and 102 points in 68 games, as the Tigers had four players crack the 100 point plateau. Bob Gassoff led the defensive unit, scoring 11 goals and 62 points in 68 games, while accumulating 388 penalty minutes. The Tigers goaltending duties were split between Sam Clegg and Jerry Thomas.

The 1973 Memorial Cup was the first time in team history that the Medicine Hat Tigers qualified to compete for the cup.

=== Quebec Remparts ===
The Quebec Remparts represented the Quebec Major Junior Hockey League at the 1973 Memorial Cup. The Remparts finished the 1972-73 with a 49-11-4 record, earning 102 points and the best record in the QMJHL. The club was awarded the Jean Rougeau Trophy as the best regular season team. The Remparts were a high scoring team, leading the league with 448 goals. Quebec also was the best defensively, allowing 230 goals. In the QMJHL quarter-finals, the Remparts swept the Trois-Rivières Ducs in four games, then swept the Sherbrooke Castors in four games in the QMJHL semi-finals. In the league finals, the Remparts defeated the defending league champions, the Cornwall Royals four games to three to win the President's Cup and earned a berth into the 1973 Memorial Cup.

The Remparts were led offensively by Andre Savard, who led the QMJHL with 151 points after scoring 67 goals and 84 assists in 56 games. Savard was awarded the Michel Brière Memorial Trophy as the Most Valuable Player in the league. Savard also won the Jean Béliveau Trophy as the league leading scorer. Savard continued his high scoring into the post-season, as he led the league with 42 points in 15 games. Jacques Locas scored a league high 68 goals, and finished the season with 143 points, the second highest total in the league, in 62 games. Guy Chouinard scored 43 goals and 129 points in 59 games as a sixteen year old, as he became a top prospect. Yvon Dupuis scored 50 goals and 126 points in 62 games, giving the Remparts four players with 126 or more points. Real Cloutier scored 39 goals and 99 points in 57 games, as he also became a top prospect. Jean Landry led the defense with 20 goals and 65 points in 63 games. In goal, Pierre Perusse earned a record of 32-6-4 with a 3.72 GAA and a .896 save percentage in 44 games. Perusse was awarded the Jacques Plante Memorial Trophy as the top goaltender in the QMJHL.

The Quebec Remparts had previously won the Memorial Cup in 1971 in their only other appearance.

=== Toronto Marlboros ===
The Toronto Marlboros represented the Ontario Hockey Association at the 1973 Memorial Cup. The Marlboros dominated the 1972-73 season, earning a league best record of 47-7-9 for 103 points. The Marlboros scored a league high 416 goals, while they allowed the fewest goals in the league with 199 goals against. In the post-season, the Marlboros swept the St. Catharines Black Hawks eight points to zero in the OHA quarter-finals. Toronto remained hot in the semi-finals, as the Marlboros swept the Ottawa 67's eight points to zero. In the OHA finals, the Marlboros defeated the defending champions, the Peterborough Petes, eight points to six to win the J. Ross Robertson Cup and earn a berth at the 1973 Memorial Cup.

The Marlboros were led by Wayne Dillon, who led the team with 47 goals and 107 points in 59 games. Peter Marrin finished the season with 42 goals and 106 points in 59 games. Mark Howe scored 38 goals and 104 points in 60 games to lead the Marlboros defense. Paulin Bordeleau scored a team high 54 goals, and added 43 assists for 97 points in 56 games. Glenn Goldup scored 42 goals and 95 points in 54 games, while accumulating 173 penalty minutes. In goal, the Marlboros were led by Mike Palmateer, who won the Dave Pinkney Trophy, which is awarded to the goaltender on the team that allowed the fewest goals in the OHA. Marlboros head coach George Armstrong was awarded the Matt Leyden Trophy as Coach of the Year in the OHA.

The 1973 Memorial Cup was the Marlboros sixth appearance to compete for the championship. In their previous five appearances, the Marlboros had won the Memorial Cup. They won the Memorial Cup in 1929, 1955, 1956, 1964 and in 1967.

== Round-robin standings ==
Pos	Team	Pld	W	L	GF	GA	
1	Toronto Marlboros (OHA)	2	1	1	7	5	Advanced to final
2	Quebec Remparts (QMJHL)	2	1	1	9	8	Advanced to final
3	Medicine Hat Tigers (WHL)	2	1	1	6	9	

== Scores ==
Round-robin

- May 7 Toronto 5-2 Quebec
- May 9 Medicine Hat 3-2 Toronto
- May 11 Quebec 7-3 Medicine Hat

Final

- May 12 Toronto 9-1 Quebec

=== Winning roster ===
1972-73 Toronto Marlboros
Goaltenders: 1 – Kevin Neville; 30 – Mike Palmateer	Defencemen: 2 – Tom Edur; 3 – Marty Howe; 6 – Bob Dailey - C; 7 – Jim Clarke; 9 – Mark Howe; 10 – John Hughes; 25 – Dennis Owchar	Wingers: 11 – Geoff Green; 12 – Kevin Devine; 16 – Dan Glugosh; 18 – Glenn Goldup; 20 – Jeff Woodyatt; 21 – Dick Decloe	Centres: 8 – Bruce Boudreau; 14 – Peter Marrin - A; 15 – Brad Winton; 17 – Brian Dillon; 19 – Wayne Dillon; 23 – Paulin Bordeleau - A; Coach: George Armstrong; General Manager: Frank Bonello

== Award winners ==
- Stafford Smythe Memorial Trophy (MVP): Mark Howe, Toronto
