= Gordie Howe =

Canadian ice hockey player (1928–2016)

OC Gordie Howe
- Hockey Hall of Fame, 1972
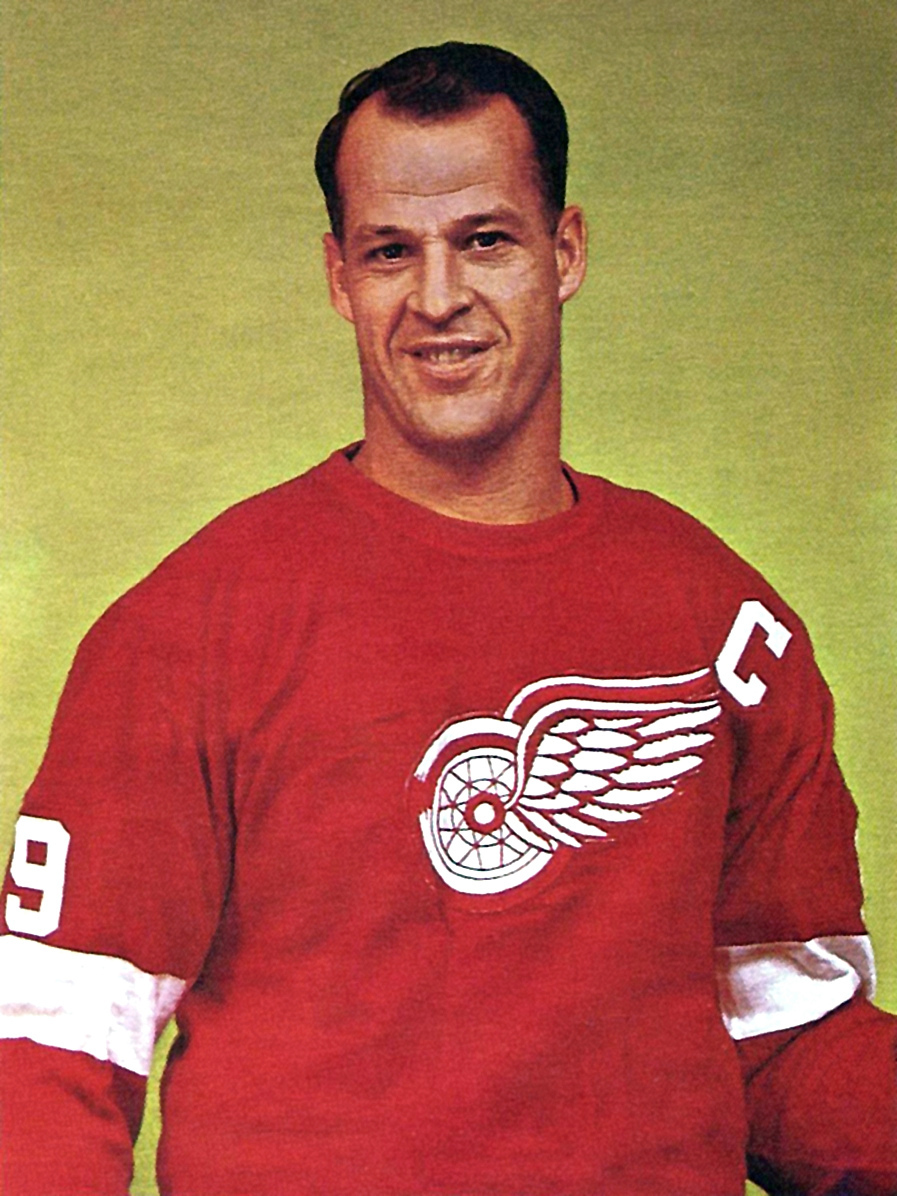
- Howe with the Detroit Red Wings, c. 1963
- Born: March 31, 1928 Floral, Saskatchewan, Canada
- Died: June 10, 2016 (aged 88) Sylvania, Ohio, U.S.
- Height: 6 ft 0 in (183 cm)
- Weight: 205 lb (93 kg; 14 st 9 lb)
- Position: Right wing
- Shot: Right (sometimes left)
- Played for: Detroit Red Wings; Houston Aeros; Hartford Whalers
- National team: Canada
- Playing career: 1946–1971: 1973–1980

Gordon Howe (March 31, 1928 – June 10, 2016) was a Canadian professional ice hockey player. From 1946 to 1980, he played 26 seasons in the National Hockey League (NHL) and six seasons in the World Hockey Association (WHA); his first 25 seasons were spent with the Detroit Red Wings. Nicknamed "Mr. Hockey", Howe is often considered the most complete player ever to play the game and one of the greatest of all time. At his retirement, his 801 goals, 1,049 assists, and 1,850 total points were all NHL records that stood until they were broken by Wayne Gretzky, who himself has been a major champion of Howe's legacy. A 23-time NHL All-Star, he shares the NHL record for seasons played with Chris Chelios, and his all-time NHL games played record of 1,767 was only surpassed in 2021 by Patrick Marleau. In 2017, Howe was named one of the "100 Greatest NHL Players".

Howe made his NHL debut with the Red Wings in 1946. He won the Art Ross Trophy for leading the league in points each year from 1950–51 to 1953–54, then again in 1956–57 and 1962–63, for a total of six times, which is the second most in NHL history. He led the NHL in goal-scoring four times. He ranked among the top ten in the NHL scoring for 21 consecutive years. He set an NHL record for points in a season (95) in 1953, a record that was broken six years later. He won the Stanley Cup with the Red Wings four times and won six Hart Trophies as the NHL's most valuable player. He also led the NHL in playoff points six times.

Howe retired for the first time in 1971 and was immediately inducted into the Saskatchewan Sports Hall of Fame that same year. He was then inducted into the Hockey Hall of Fame the following year but came back two years later to join his sons Mark and Marty on the Houston Aeros of the WHA. Although in his mid-40s, he scored over 100 points twice in six years, won two straight Avco World Trophies (1974 and 1975), and was named most valuable player in 1974; he scored a total of 174 goals in the WHA. He was traded to the New England Whalers in 1977, where he became the first player to play a professional hockey game at age 50 and score 1,000 career goals. When the Whalers joined the NHL in the 1979–80 season, now playing in Hartford, Howe decided to play for the team. By playing in the opening game on October 11, he became the oldest person to play in an NHL game and appeared in all 80 games of the season, scoring 15 goals. Weeks after turning 52 years old, Howe retired. His involvement with the WHA was central to their brief pre-NHL merger success, forcing the NHL to recruit European talent and expand to new markets. In totality of two professional leagues, Howe scored 975 regular season goals along with 96 playoff goals and was awarded the most valuable player award seven times.

Although Howe was most famous for his scoring prowess, he possessed great physical strength and toughness, and he redefined the ideal qualities of a forward by becoming known for his superior play on both offense and defense. He is the only player to have competed in the NHL in five different decades (1940s through 1980s); he also played a shift in a 1997 game for the Detroit Vipers of the IHL, playing professional hockey for a sixth decade. He became the namesake of the "Gordie Howe hat trick": a goal, an assist, and a fight in the same game, though he only recorded two such games in his career. He was the inaugural recipient of the NHL Lifetime Achievement Award in 2008.

== Early life ==
Howe was born in a farmhouse in Floral, Saskatchewan, the son of Katherine (Schultz) and Albert Howe. He was one of nine siblings. When Gordie was nine days old, the Howes moved to Saskatoon, where his father worked as a labourer during the Depression. In the summers, Howe would work construction with his father. Howe was mildly dyslexic growing up but was physically beyond his years at an early age. Already six feet tall in his mid-teens, doctors feared a calcium deficiency and encouraged him to strengthen his spine with chin-ups. He began playing organized hockey at age eight. Howe quit school during the Depression to work in construction, then left Saskatoon at 16 to pursue his hockey career.

== Playing career ==
Howe was an ambidextrous player, one of just a few skaters able to use the straight sticks of his era to shoot either left- or right-handed. As a young teen, he played bantam hockey with the King George Athletic Club in Saskatoon, winning his first championship with them in the 1942 Saskatchewan Provincial Bantam Hockey Finals. He received his first taste of professional hockey at age 15 in 1943 when he was invited by the New York Rangers to their training camp held at "The Amphitheatre" in Winnipeg, Manitoba. He played well enough there that the Rangers wanted Howe to sign a "C" form, which would have given that club his National Hockey League rights, and to play that year at the College of Notre Dame, a Catholic high school in Wilcox, Saskatchewan, that was known for producing good hockey players. However, Howe did not feel that was a good fit for him and wanted to go back home to play hockey with his friends; he declined the Rangers' offer and returned to Saskatoon.

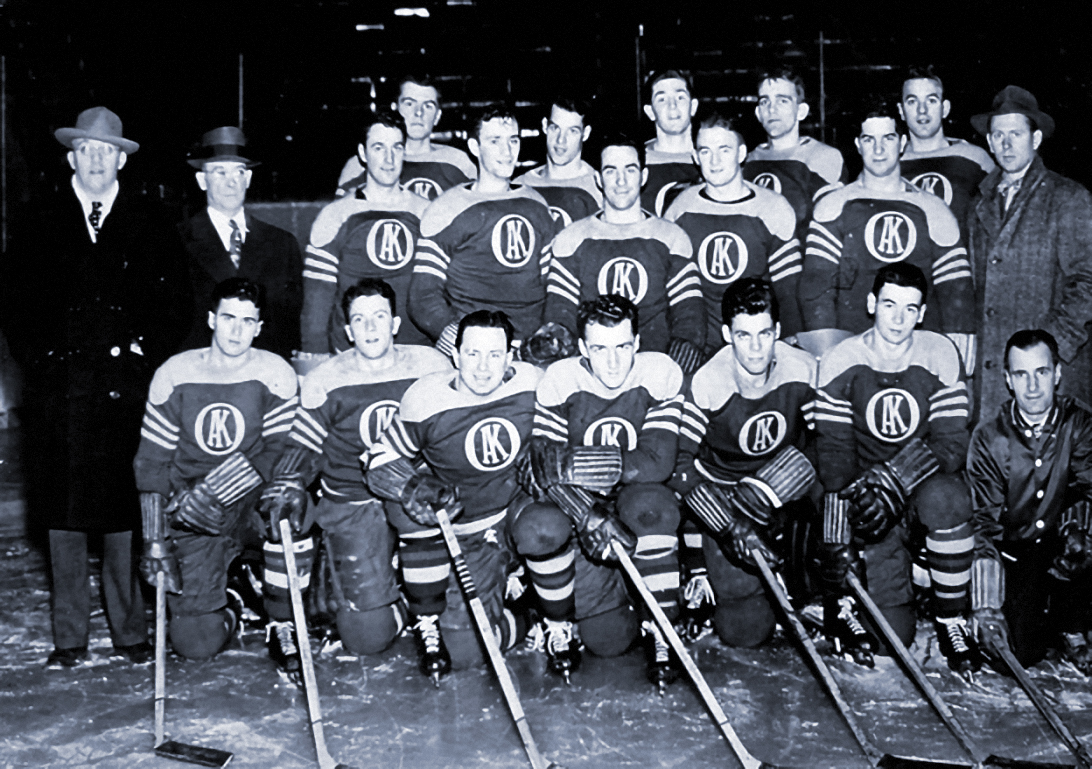
Gordie Howe (2nd from left, back row) on the 1945–46 Omaha Knights (USHL)

In 1944, Howe was noticed by Detroit Red Wings scout Fred Pinkney and was invited to their camp in Windsor, Ontario. He was signed by the Red Wings to a "C" form and assigned to their junior team, the Galt Red Wings. Due to Canadian Amateur Hockey Association limits on transferring players from Western Canada to the east, Howe was declared ineligible for the 1944–45 OHA season. Howe played only one regular season game for Galt, scoring one goal and two assists on November 18, 1944, which were later stricken from the official records when the Hamilton Barons folded. Howe was to attend Galt Collegiate Institute but instead worked at a metal factory, and remained with Galt for the season participating only in practices and exhibition games.

In the next season, Howe was promoted to the Omaha Knights of the minor professional United States Hockey League (USHL), where he scored 48 points in 51 games as a 17-year-old. While playing in Omaha, Frank Selke of the Toronto Maple Leafs noticed Howe's rights needed to be properly listed as Red Wings property. Having a good relationship with Detroit head coach Jack Adams, he notified Adams of the clerical error, and Howe was quickly put on the team's protected list.

=== Detroit Red Wings ===
Howe made his NHL debut on October 16, 1946, playing right wing for the Detroit Red Wings, scoring in his first game at age 18. He wore number 17 as a rookie. However, when Roy Conacher joined the Chicago Black Hawks after the 1946–47 season, Howe was offered Conacher's number 9, which he would wear for the rest of his career. Although he had not requested the change, Howe accepted it when he was informed "9" would entitle him to a lower Pullman berth on road trips. He quickly established himself as a great goalscorer and a gifted playmaker with a willingness to fight. Howe fought so often in his rookie season that head coach Jack Adams told him, "I know you can fight. Now can you show me you can play hockey?" The term "Gordie Howe hat trick" (consisting of a goal, an assist, and a fight) was coined in reference to his penchant for fighting; however, Howe himself only recorded two such hat tricks in his career, on October 10, 1953, and March 21, 1954. Using his great physical strength, he was able to dominate the opposition in a career that spanned six decades (including one game with the Detroit Vipers of the IHL in 1997). In a feat unsurpassed by any hockey player, he finished in the top five in scoring for 20-straight seasons. The first player to score 600 goals, Howe also scored 20 or more goals in 22 consecutive seasons between 1949 and 1971, an NHL record.

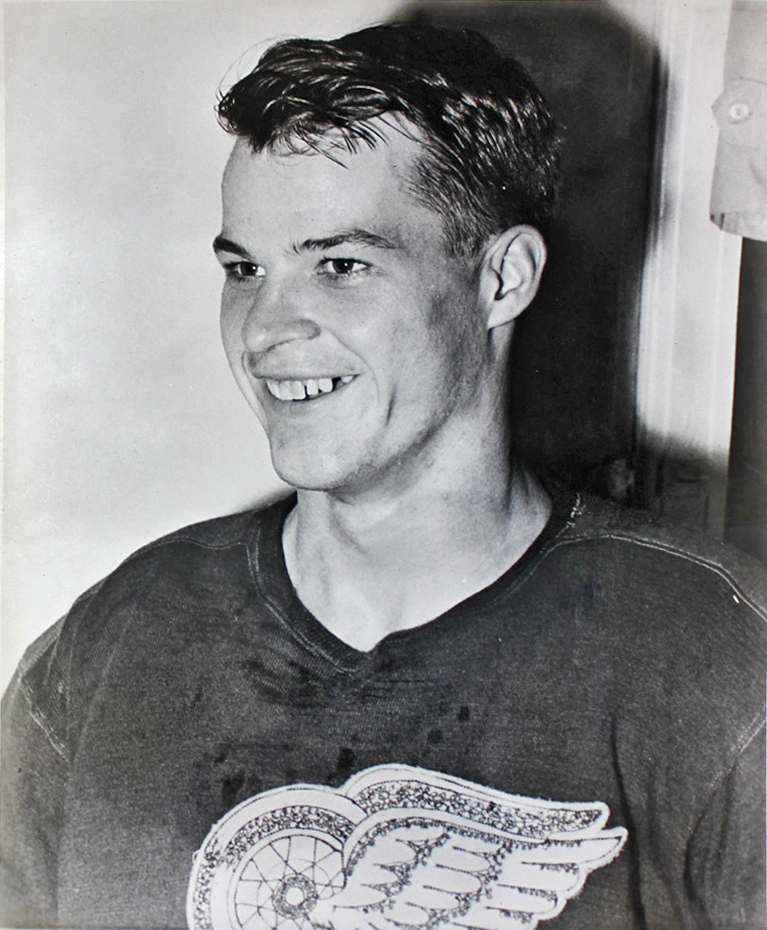
Howe made his NHL debut for the Detroit Red Wings in 1946

Howe led Detroit to four Stanley Cup championships and to first place in regular-season play for seven consecutive years (1948–49 to 1954–55), the latter of which remains a feat never equalled in NHL history. During this time, Howe and his linemates—centre Sid Abel and left winger Ted Lindsay—were known collectively as "The Production Line", both for their scoring and as an allusion to Detroit auto factories. The trio dominated the NHL in such a fashion that in 1949–50, they finished one-two-three in NHL scoring.

However, as he was emerging as one of the top players in the league, Howe sustained the worst injury of his career - his skull was fractured and his cheekbone and nose were broken after his attempt to check the Toronto Maple Leafs captain Ted Kennedy into the boards went awry during the playoffs. The severity of the fracture was such that he was taken to the hospital for emergency surgery in order to relieve the pressure on his brain. He missed the rest of the playoffs, but his dominant teammates were still able to win the Stanley Cup.

The next season, 1950–51, Howe came back, responding to his severe injuries by playing in every game, by leading the NHL in goals, assists, and total points (86), and by winning the scoring title by 20 points. This was the first year of a four-year period of dominance by Howe which the NHL had never seen before. He won four straight scoring titles and in two of the years (1950–51 and 1952–53) he led the NHL in both goals and assists, which has only been done by five other players in history (a total of 10 times aside from Howe). In three of those years, he led the NHL in goals. In 1952–53, Howe became the first NHL player to score 90 points, finishing the season with 95 points and a career-best 49 goals which just missed tying the league record of 50 goals held by Maurice "Rocket" Richard (albeit in a 50-game season). Prior to Howe, no NHLer had led the NHL in points more than two times in a row. Only three other players have ever matched the feat of winning four straight scoring titles since—Phil Esposito, Jaromír Jágr, and Wayne Gretzky (who won seven in a row). During the 1960-61 season, on November 27, 1960, Howe became the first ever hockey player to record 1,000 points for a career, doing so on an assist versus the Toronto Maple Leafs; the 1,000th point was recorded in his 938th game, and the following season saw him become the first player to play in 1,000 games. On November 10, 1963, he became the all-time goal leader with his 545th career goal against Montreal.

As Howe emerged as one of the game's superstars, he was frequently compared to the Montreal Canadiens' Maurice Richard. Both were right wingers who wore #9, were regular challengers for the league scoring title, and could also play roughly if needed. Their first NHL match-up was in 1946, where Richard hit Howe with a hard check and an elbow to the chin. Howe and Richard never got to fight due to Sid Abel intervening. Abel received a broken nose. Howe recalled "They always thought there was bad blood because I hit [Richard] once coming across the line and he spun like a rocket and fell down. He wasn't hurt that much and I started to laugh. But the laughter stopped when there were eight guys on me". Howe also had a rivalry with the Canadiens' centre Jean Béliveau, who wrote in his autobiography that "trying to strong-arm Gordie off the puck in a corner was akin to wrestling with a telephone pole". The Red Wings and Canadiens faced off in four Stanley Cup Finals during the 1950s, and again in the 1966 final; Detroit prevailed in 1952, 1954 and 1955, but Montreal triumphed in 1956 and 1966.

The Red Wings also had a fierce rivalry with the Chicago Blackhawks who defeated them in the 1961 Stanley Cup Final. Chicago's Stan Mikita recalled one time as a rookie when he slashed Howe saying "he was an old man who didn't belong on the ice"; later in the season Howe exacted revenge with a check that gave Mikita a concussion. Bobby Hull recalled the times he and Howe played against each other saying 'I enjoyed every high-sticking minute of it', describing Howe as "strong as a bull and tougher than a night in jail". In the 1968 All-Star Game where Hull and Howe were teammates for the first time, Hull said "it was nice finally having Gordie on my side. He was no fun playing against." Hull and Howe would also be rivals in the World Hockey Association (WHA), as members of the Winnipeg Jets and Houston Aeros, respectively, and would be reunited as teammates on the Hartford Whalers where they finished off their playing careers.

After being consistent contenders through the 1950s and early 1960s, the Red Wings began to slump in the late 1960s. When Howe turned 40 in 1967–68, the NHL expanded from 6 to 12 teams and the number of scoring opportunities grew as the game schedule increased. Howe played the 1968–69 season on a line with Alex Delvecchio and Frank Mahovlich. Mahovlich was a scorer, and Delvecchio was a gifted playmaker. The three were dubbed "The Production Line 3", and at age 40, Howe scored 103 points, surpassing 100 points for the only time in his NHL career by scoring 44 goals and a career-high 59 assists. Howe, along with Hull and Esposito, became the first players in NHL history to record a 100-point season. Howe became the first player to record a 100-point season in their forties; Howe is the only player in his forties to have scored 40 goals and collect 100 points in a season in NHL history.

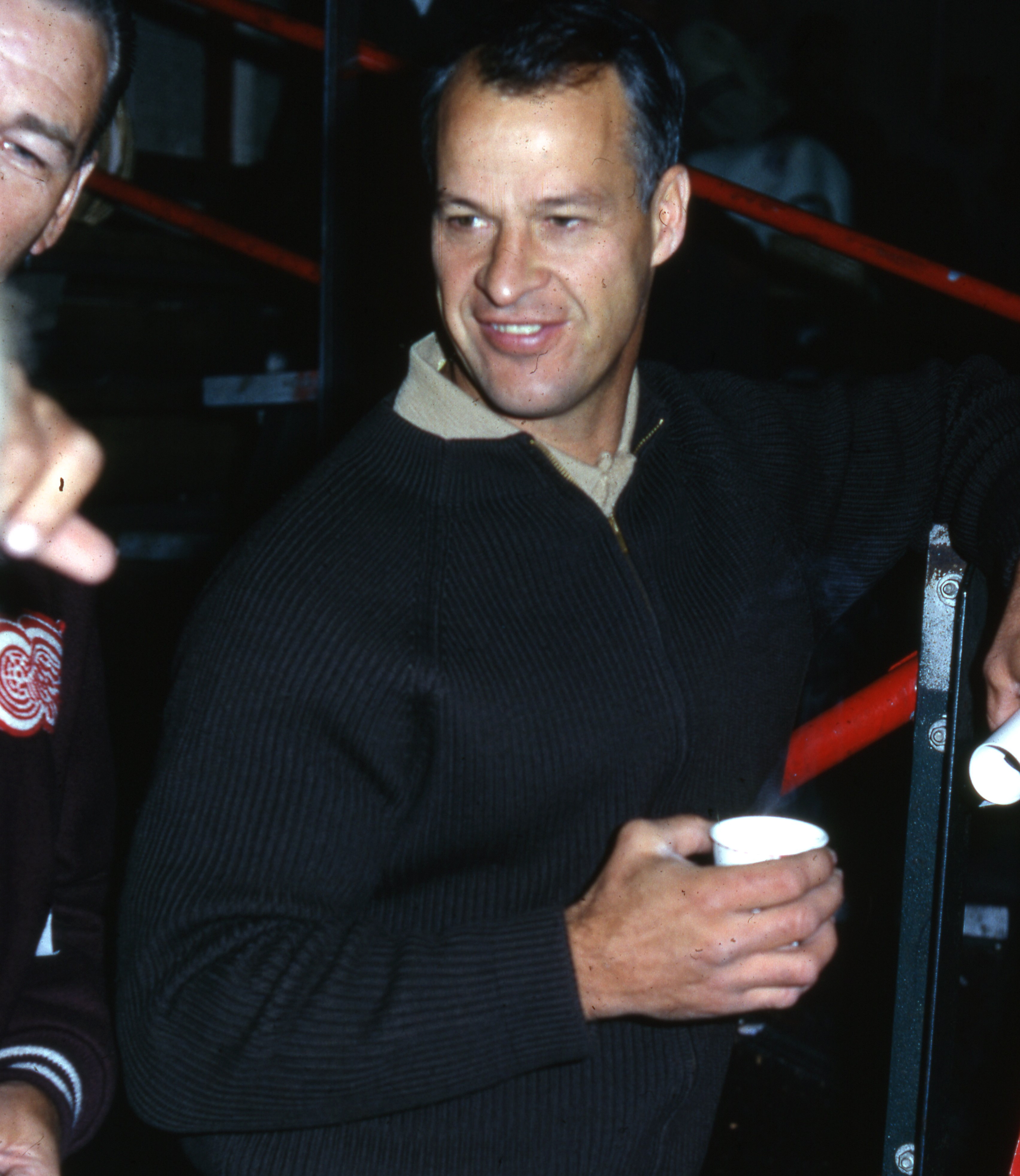
Howe relaxing at "Gordie Howe Hockeyland" in St. Clair Shores, Michigan, circa 1966

Following his personal best 103-point season, conflict arose with the Red Wings after Howe discovered he was just the third-highest paid player on the team with a $45,000 salary. While team owner Bruce Norris increased Howe's salary to $100,000, he blamed Howe's wife, Colleen, for the demand. Howe remained with the club for two more seasons, but after 25 years, a chronic wrist problem forced him to retire after the 1970–71 season and he took a job in the Red Wings front office. At the beginning of 1972, he was offered the job as first head coach of the New York Islanders, but declined it.

By the end of his NHL career, Howe had won the Hart Memorial Trophy as the NHL's most valuable player six times: 1952, 1953, 1957, 1958, 1960 and 1963—at that time the most of any player, and as of 2025 second only to Gretzky's nine. He also finished second or third in the voting for the Hart a further six times. Howe was named to the NHL's First All-Star Team 12 times and to the Second All-Star Team eight times.

Howe was named an Officer of the Order of Canada in 1971. His number 9 jersey was retired by the Red Wings on March 12, 1972.

=== World Hockey Association ===
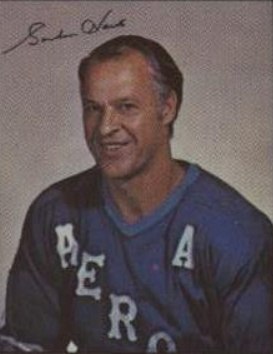
Howe in 1974 with the Houston Aeros; in 1974 at the conclusion of the 1973-74 season, he won the league MVP award. At age 46, he became the oldest player to win a pro hockey MVP in history.

One year later, Howe was offered a contract to play with the Houston Aeros of the newly formed World Hockey Association (WHA), which had also signed his sons Mark and Marty to contracts for $5 million for four years, although Gordie's contract called for just one year. Dissatisfied with not having any meaningful influence in the Red Wings' office, he underwent wrist surgery to make a return to hockey possible. According to his son Mark, training camp initially saw Gordie be out of shape to the point where his skin turned purple for the first week before getting back into form, with Mark stating, "Gordie has always been -- if he wants to do something, he'll do it."

Howe led his new team to consecutive league championships in 1974 and 1975; he had stated at the time that winning the former with his children playing alongside him "probably" meant more to him than his Stanley Cup wins with Detroit. In 1974, at age 46, Howe won the Gary L. Davidson Trophy, awarded to the WHA's Most Valuable Player (the trophy was renamed the Gordie Howe Trophy the following year); he is the oldest player to win the MVP in NHL/WHA history. He pondered retiring after both the end of the Avco Cup Final of 1974 and 1975 for a front office job but ultimately kept playing. In December 1975, he received his first and only suspension as a player after a December 5 game versus Winnipeg that saw him bump an official when trying to call him over to disagree on a high-sticking penalty. He was issued a two-game suspension and fine. Howe played with the Aeros until 1977, when he and his sons joined the New England Whalers on May 23, 1977. In the 1977–78 WHA season, Howe got to 999 professional goals (regular season and playoffs combined in both leagues) in November before getting into a drought for nearly a month while also dealing with a wrist injury. On December 7, playing against the Birmingham Bulls at BJCC Coliseum in the first period, Howe became the first player to score 1,000 professional goals, doing so off goaltender John Garrett at 1:36 in the first period off assists by John McKenzie and Mike Antonovich; he was later given a trophy from the city of Birmingham for his achievement.

In a game when Marty's cheekbone was broken by opposing player Robbie Ftorek, in the next game between the two teams, Howe used his stick to cross-check Ftorek in the face. Writer Michael Farber recounted "Mark told Gordie, 'Dad, he's [Robbie] my friend, he's an old teammate on Team Canada, he has been a mentor to me,' But none of that mattered. Robbie had mussed up a Howe. Gordie Howe grew up on the prairie. He believed in prairie justice." He became the first grandfather to play professional hockey during the 1978 WHA playoffs at age 50 when his son Mark saw the birth of his first child.

=== 1974 Summit Series and WHA All-Star Games ===
Howe was named with sons Mark and Marty to the WHA version of Team Canada for an eight-game series against the Soviet Union. Playing on a line with son Mark and Ralph Backstrom, Howe contributed seven points in seven games at age 46. The Soviets won the series four wins to Canada's one, and with three ties.

In the final season of the WHA, Howe had the opportunity to play with Wayne Gretzky in the 1979 WHA All-Star Games. With a format of a three-game series between the WHA All-Stars and Dynamo Moscow, the WHA All-Stars were coached by Jacques Demers, and Demers asked Howe if it was okay to put him on a line with Gretzky and his son Mark. In game one, the line scored seven points, as the WHA All-Stars won by a score of 4–2. In game two, Gretzky and Mark Howe each scored a goal and Gordie Howe picked up an assist as the WHA won 4–2. The WHA also won Game Three to ensure a clean sweep.

=== Hartford Whalers ===
When the WHA folded in 1979, the renamed Hartford Whalers joined the NHL. While the Red Wings still held Howe's NHL rights even though he had retired eight years earlier, the Whalers and Red Wings reached a gentleman's agreement in which Detroit agreed not to reclaim him. Howe had experienced dizzy spells in the latter part of the 1978–79 WHA season, and underwent an "extensive battery of tests" before deciding to play the 1979–80 NHL season. By playing in the opening game on October 11, Howe, now 51, passed Doug Harvey to be the oldest person to play in an NHL game. In Howe's final season, he would appear in all 80 games of the schedule and helped his team to make the playoffs by scoring 41 points (15 goals and 26 assists). Late in the season, the Whalers signed Bobby Hull and put Howe, Hull and Dave Keon on the same line. One particular honour came when Wales Conference head coach Scotty Bowman selected Howe, Phil Esposito and Jean Ratelle to the mid-season All-Star Game—which was to take place in Detroit—as a nod to their storied careers before they retired. Howe had played in five decades of All-Star Games and he would skate alongside the second-youngest to ever play in an All-Star Game, 19-year-old Wayne Gretzky. The Joe Louis Arena crowd gave him a standing ovation twice, lasting so long he had to skate to the bench to stop people from cheering. He had one assist in the Wales Conference's 6–3 win. According to Mark Howe, Howe did not plan to retire in 1980 and that it was the organization that decided to not offer him a contract, wanting to instead get younger.

On April 6, 1980, Howe scored his 801st and final goal in the NHL against the Detroit Red Wings at the Hartford Civic Center. Howe played his final game at the age of 52 years and 10 days on April 11, 1980, in game three of the Preliminary Round of the 1980 Stanley Cup playoffs, where Montreal eliminated Hartford 4–3 at the Civic Center.

== Retirement ==
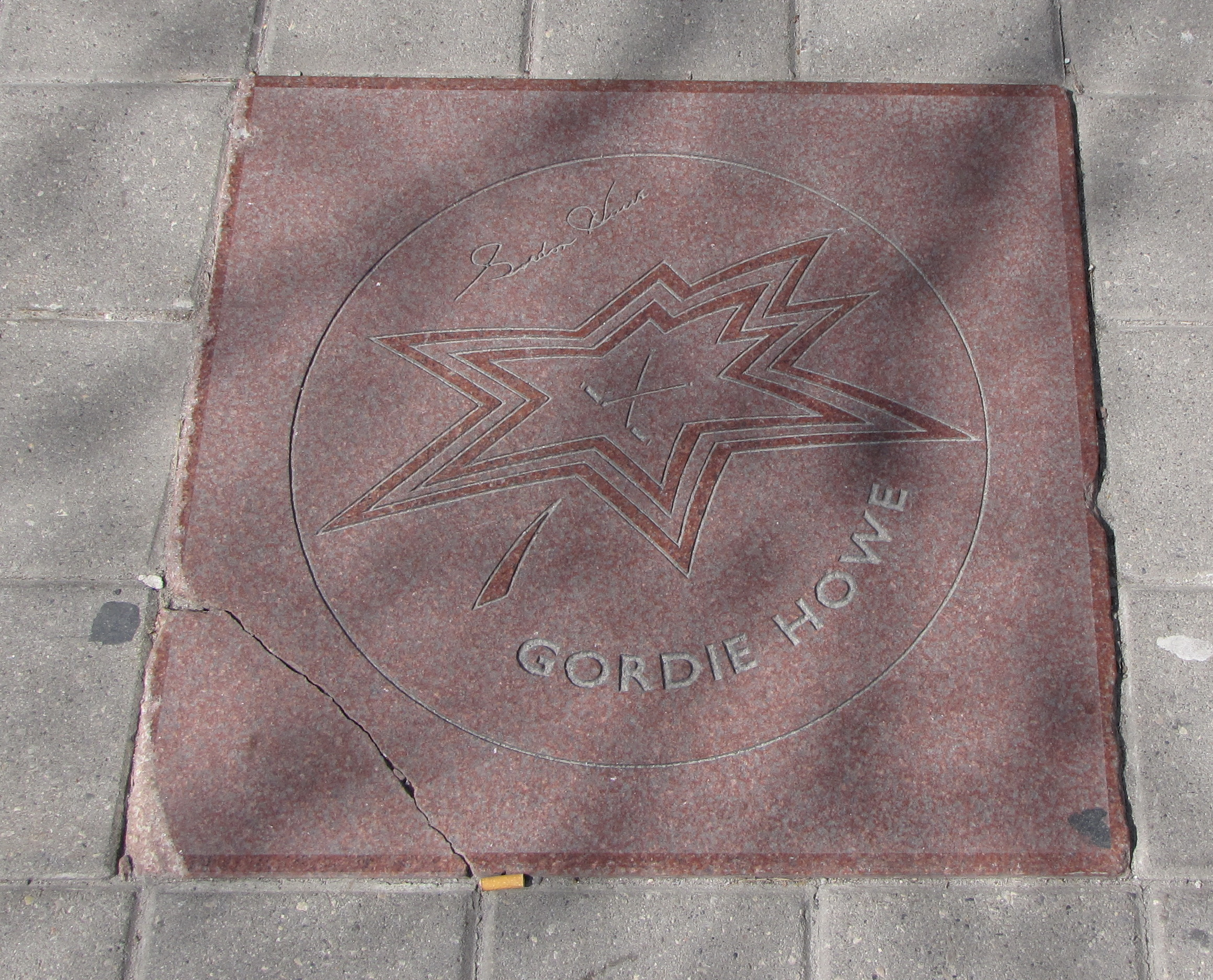
Howe's star on Toronto's Walk of Fame. He received the honour in 2000.

Howe was named to Canada's Sports Hall of Fame in 1975. In 1998, The Hockey News released their List of Top 100 NHL Players of All Time and listed Howe third overall, behind Wayne Gretzky and Bobby Orr. Of the list, Gretzky and Orr were quoted as regarding Howe as the greatest player. In 2000, Howe was inducted into Canada's Walk of Fame.

On April 10, 2007, Howe was honoured with the unveiling of a new bronze statue in Joe Louis Arena, where the West Entrance is named the "Gordie Howe Entrance" in his honour. The statue is 12 feet (3.7 m) tall and weighs about 4,500 pounds (2,000 kg). The statue contains all of Howe's stats and history. Another statue of Howe was erected in downtown Saskatoon, Saskatchewan, on the corner of 20th Street and 1st Ave. He is depicted wearing a Detroit Red Wings sweater. The statue has since been relocated to the SaskTel Centre.

In February 2011, various groups proposed naming the New International Trade Crossing Bridge, a proposed bridge that will connect Detroit and Windsor by linking Highway 401 in Ontario with Interstate 75 and Interstate 94 in Michigan, in honour of Howe. On May 14, 2015, during an event attended by Canadian Prime Minister Stephen Harper, it was officially announced that the bridge would be known as the Gordie Howe International Bridge.

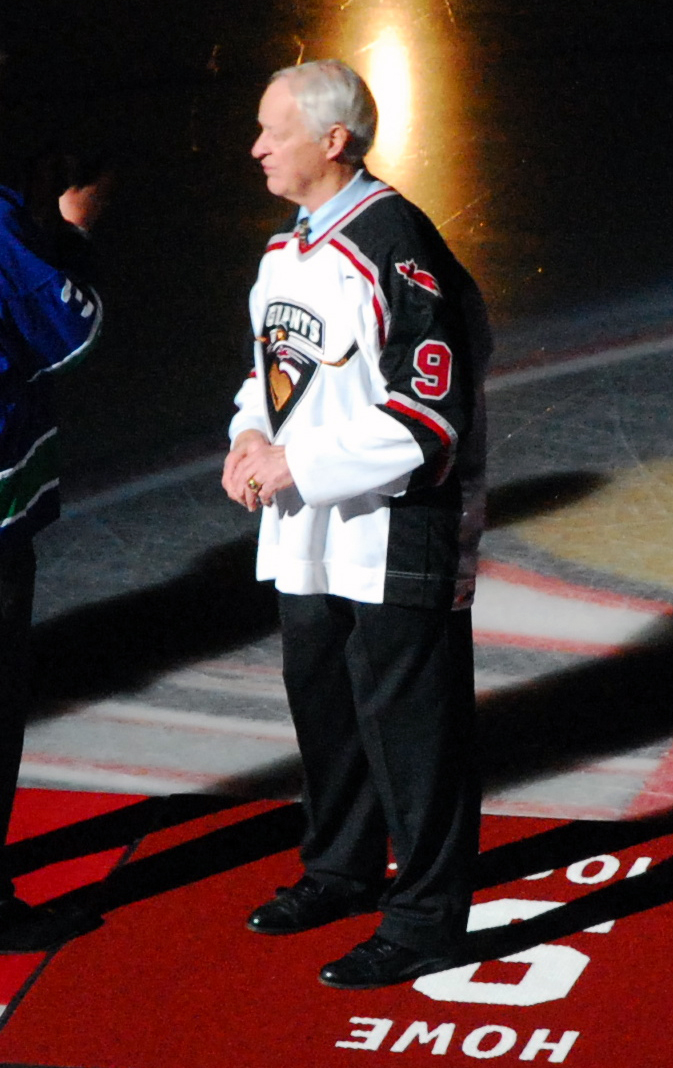
Howe appearing at Gordie Howe Night as part owner of the Vancouver Giants in 2008

Canadian actor Michael Shanks portrayed Howe in the television film Mr. Hockey: The Gordie Howe Story. The film aired April 28, 2013, on CBC Television in Canada, and on the Hallmark Channel in the US on May 5.

After the death of his wife Colleen Howe in 2009, Howe turned his charitable activity towards degenerative diseases such as dementia and Alzheimer's, and founded the Gordie and Colleen Howe Fund for Alzheimer's, in partnership with the University of Toronto's aging and brain health facility at Baycrest Health Sciences.

== Personal life and death ==
Howe met his wife, Colleen, at a bowling alley when she was 17 years old, and they were married four years later on April 15, 1953. In the midst of his playing career, Howe appeared as himself on the March 27, 1967 episode of the CBS game show To Tell the Truth. He received two of four possible votes. Although hockey was not as popular as other sports in America in 1967, panellist Peggy Cass was a hockey fan and recognized Howe. She disqualified herself from voting. A middle school in Abbotsford, British Columbia, is named after Gordie and Colleen Howe, and a traffic bridge, campground, and football stadium are named after Gordie Howe in his hometown of Saskatoon, Saskatchewan. An arena is named for Gordie Howe in Traverse City, Michigan, where Howe lived from 1987 to 1999. Two of their sons, Marty and Mark, were his teammates on the WHA Houston Aeros and the New England (WHA)/Hartford (NHL) Whalers. Mark had a long NHL career, playing 16 seasons for the Hartford Whalers, the Philadelphia Flyers, and the Red Wings, and was one of the most dominant two-way defencemen of the 1980s. He followed his father by being elected to the Hockey Hall of Fame in 2011. Their third son, Murray, is a radiologist in Toledo, Ohio, while their only daughter, Cathy, lives in Lubbock, Texas.

Colleen Howe was one of the founders of the Detroit Junior Red Wings and represented both Gordie and Mark financially during their careers. She died in 2009 at age 76 after a long battle with Pick's disease.

Howe's younger brother, Vic Howe, also played in the NHL appearing in 33 games with the New York Rangers between 1950 and 1955. He died at the age of 85 in Moncton, New Brunswick, on January 31, 2015.

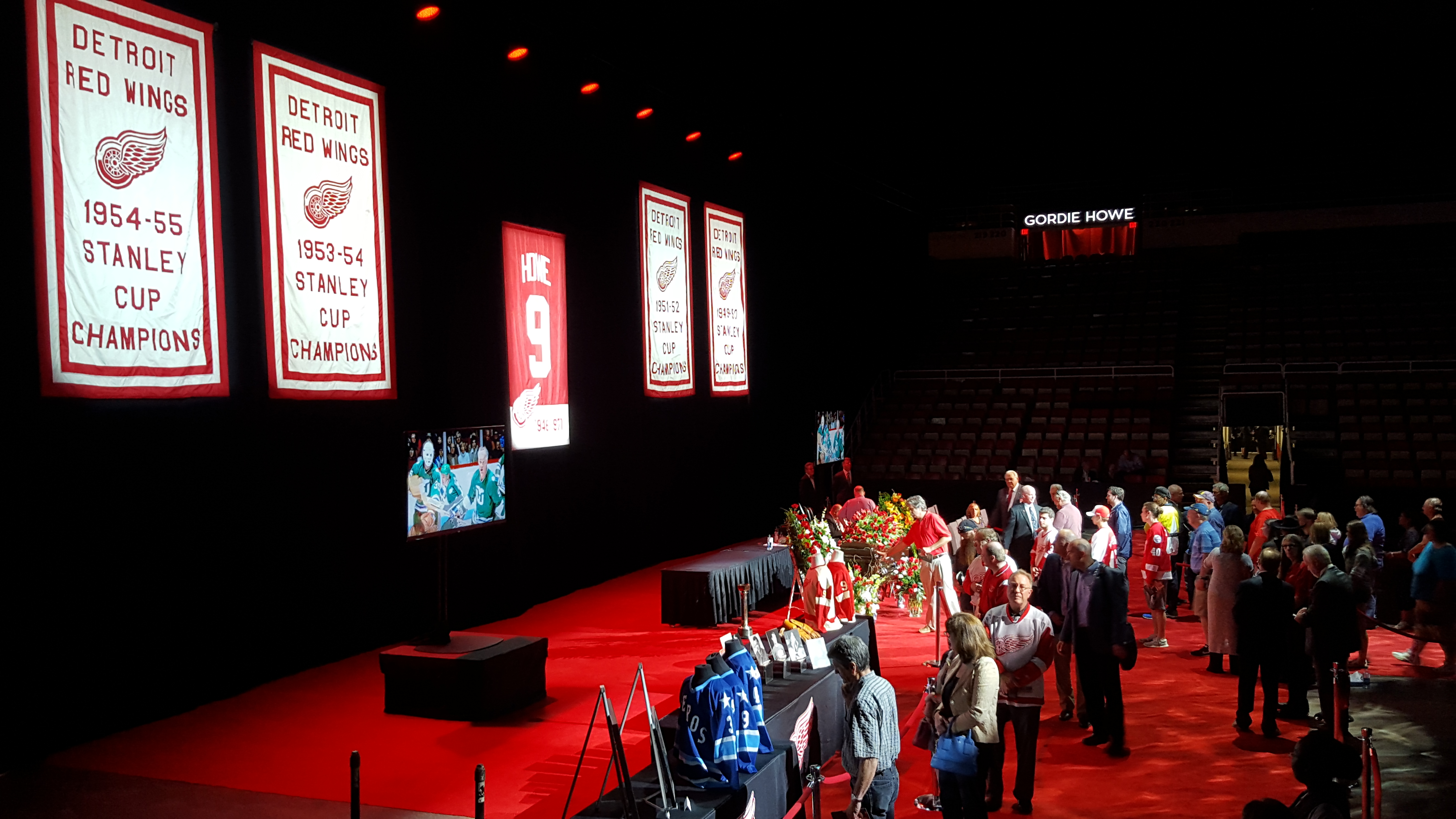
Howe lying in state at Joe Louis Arena

Due to dementia, Howe spent most of his time after his wife's death residing with all four of his children on a rotating basis. While staying at his daughter's home, he suffered a major stroke on October 26, 2014. He died at the age of 88 on June 10, 2016, at the home of his son Murray in the Toledo suburb of Sylvania, Ohio. No cause was given. Howe's casket was brought to Joe Louis Arena, the then-home of the Detroit Red Wings, for a public visitation on June 14, 2016, that lasted from 9 a.m. to 9 p.m. in honour of the #9 that Howe wore on his jersey. Wayne Gretzky, Scotty Bowman, and Detroit Tigers great Al Kaline acted as pallbearers. Howe's funeral, which was also opened to the public, was held on June 15, 2016, at Detroit's Cathedral of the Most Blessed Sacrament. Howe's cremated remains, along with those of his wife Colleen, were returned to Canada for the last time and interred in Saskatoon in September 2016, at the base of his statue outside of SaskTel Centre.

== Legacy ==
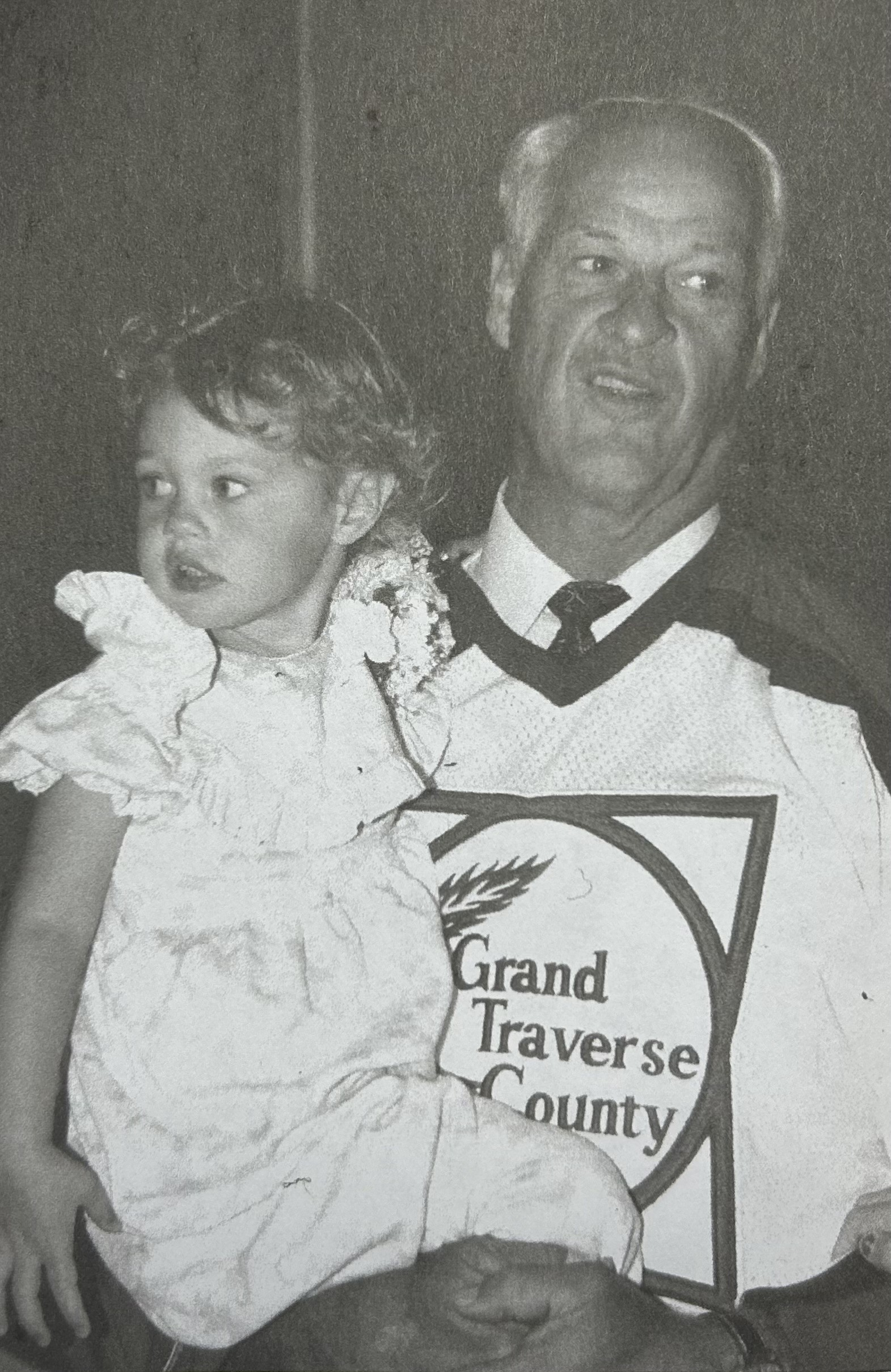
Howe in 1989 at the opening of an arena bearing his name in Traverse City, Michigan

Howe's name and nickname, "Mr. Hockey", as well as his late wife's nickname as "Mrs. Hockey", are registered trademarks. Howe was also referred to during his career as Power, Mr. Everything, Mr. All-Star, The Most, The Great Gordie, The King of Hockey, The Legend, The Man, No. 9, and "Mr. Elbows" (for his tough physical play). Howe is widely considered the most complete player in all of hockey history. Once Howe began dominating the NHL, NHL scouts were given new directives to discover players that played the way he did. Howe's strength, scoring ability, and speed exemplified the perfect example of the modern-day role of a power forward and someone who can play the 200-foot game. Howe's brawn and physical play inspired the coining of the "Gordie Howe hat-trick"—a goal, an assist and a fight—which is now a standard part of hockey's vocabulary. Ironically, Howe himself only achieved his namesake hat-trick twice in his long career, both in the early 1950s, because few players dared to fight him after Howe soundly defeated New York Rangers enforcer Lou Fontinato at Madison Square Garden in 1959. (For comparison, the current leader in Gordie Howe hat-tricks, Rick Tocchet, achieved the feat 18 times in his career.)

Howe was known for being a well-mannered and trusting person off the ice who never questioned the salary the Detroit Red Wings owners paid him. When it became public knowledge Howe had scored more than 600 goals for the organization before it reluctantly offered to pay him over $40,000, his linemate, Ted Lindsay, began a campaign to establish a player's association to unite for fair wages against the NHL owners. This would be the nucleus of the movement that became the National Hockey League Players' Association.

Howe's time playing with the WHA with his sons allowed the fledgling professional league to gain much-needed legitimacy and the ability to fill stadiums. The increased competition for hockey talent forced the insular NHL to seek players beyond its traditional North American sources and recruit professional European players and to expand into new cities to gain new fans. Wayne Gretzky was one of the players who elected to join the WHA instead of the NHL. Over the years, Howe became good friends with Gretzky, who had idolized him as a young player and who would later break many of Howe's scoring records and milestones. While Gretzky surpassed Howe statistically, it was Howe who had first set the standard for consistent, high-level play. Howe's number 9 has been worn as a tribute to him—Gretzky wore number 99 as a direct tribute to Howe since 9 was taken during the early parts of his career.

Another milestone was reached in 1997 when Howe played professional hockey in a sixth decade. He was signed to a one-game contract by the Detroit Vipers of the International Hockey League and at age 69, made a return to the ice for one shift. In so doing, he became the only player in hockey history to compete in six different decades at the professional level, having played in the USHL, NHL, WHA and IHL from the 1940s to 1990s.

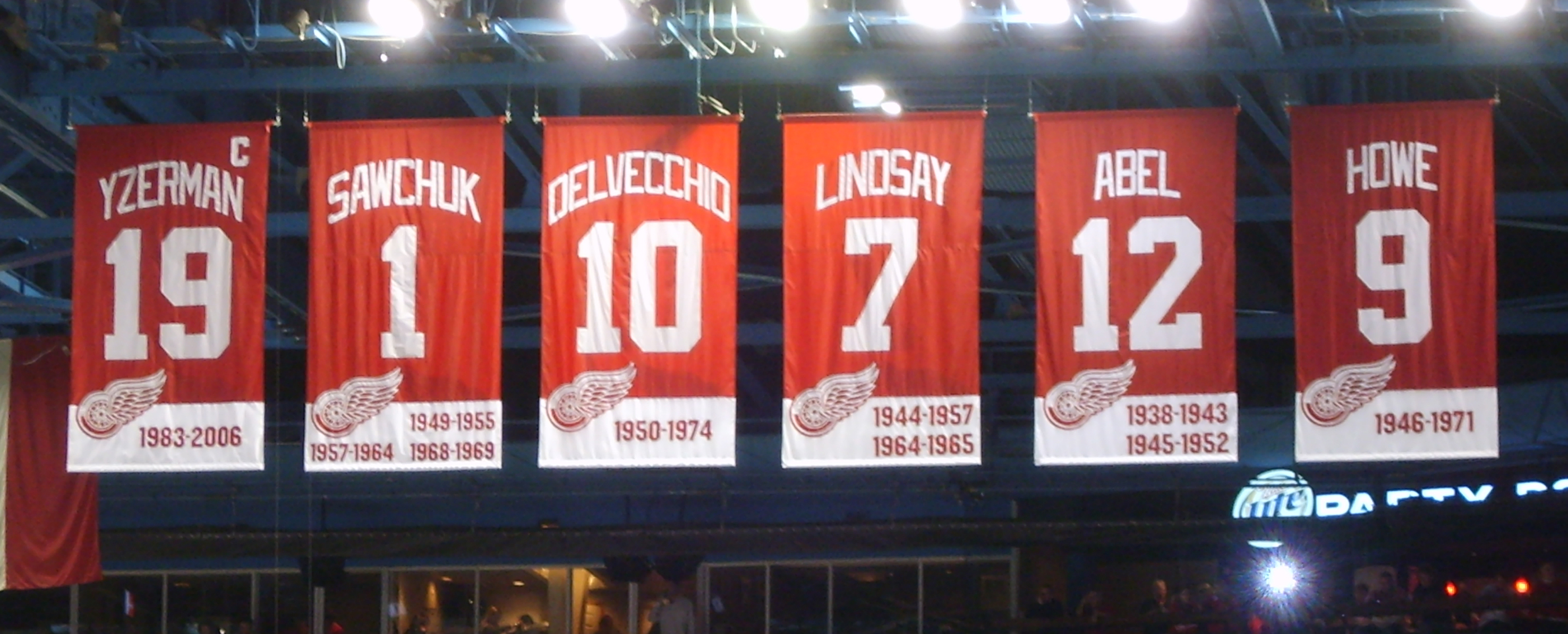
Howe's No. 9 banner hanging in Joe Louis Arena

Howe's first 20 seasons came during an era when the schedule was only 70 games, scoring was difficult, and checking was tight; he never scored 50 goals in a single season. Howe is currently fourth on the NHL's all-time points list with 1850 total points (801 goals and 1,049 assists) after Wayne Gretzky, Mark Messier and Jaromír Jágr. Howe is still third on the all-time goals list, with only Alexander Ovechkin and Gretzky ahead of him. When career regular season goals from both the NHL and the WHA are combined, he ranks first in goals with 975, ahead of Gretzky's 940.

At the time of his retirement, Howe's professional totals, including playoffs, for the NHL and WHA combined, were first. He finished with 2,421 games played, 1,071 goals, 1,518 assists, and 2,589 points. However, Gretzky would later pass him in goals (1,072), assists (2,297) and points (3,369), but not in games played or games played with one team. After Howe's death, Gretzky called Howe "the greatest hockey player ever", and said that if it were up to him Howe's No. 9 would be retired for all NHL teams the same as his own No. 99. Howe's record of 1,767 NHL games played was surpassed in April 2021 by Patrick Marleau. However, combining his games played in the WHA, he holds the record for most regular season games played in the major leagues with 2,186.

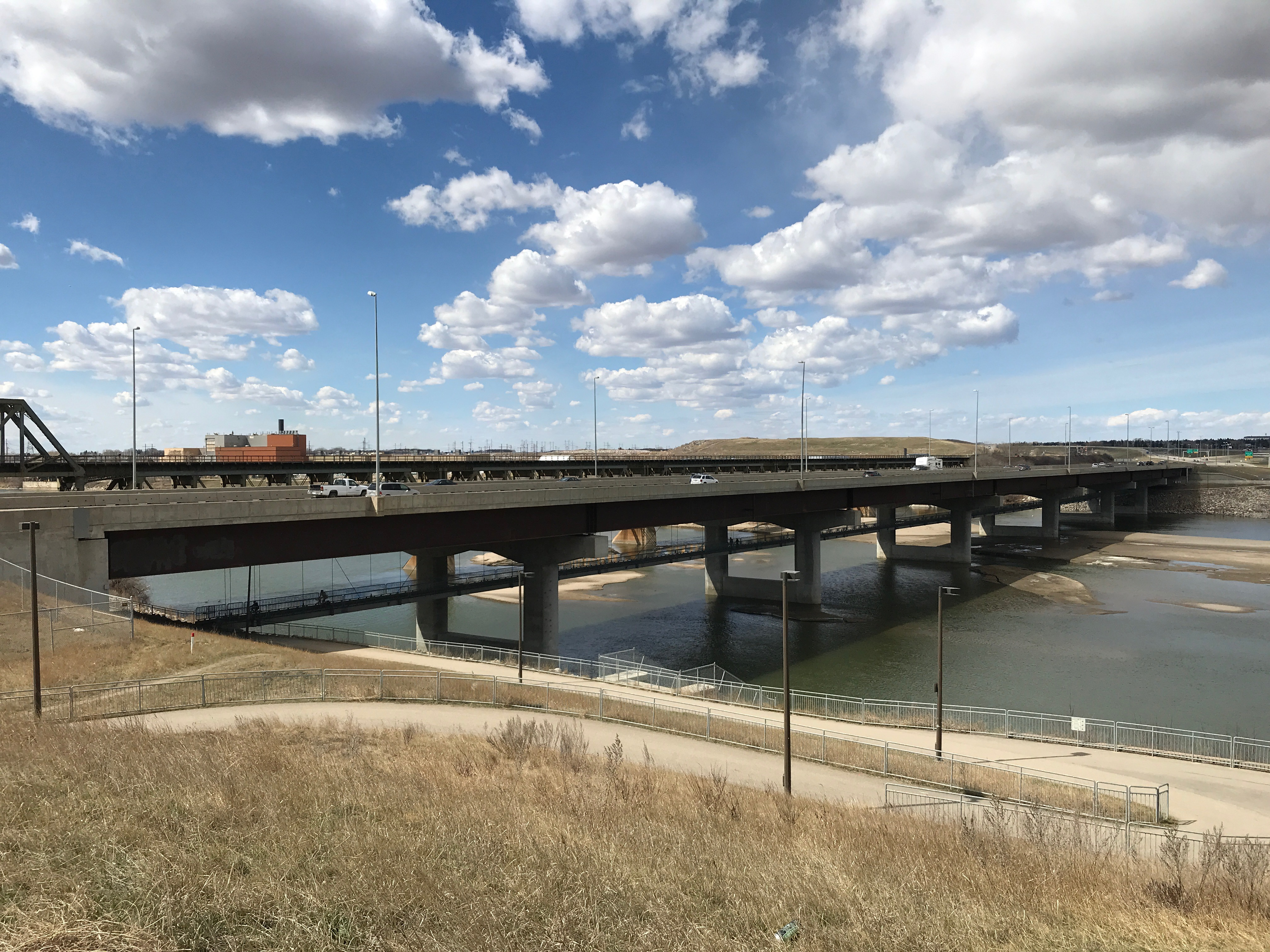
Gordie Howe Bridge in Saskatoon, was named after Howe in June 2016

Howe played internationally on one occasion, at the 1974 Summit Series.

=== Popular culture ===
In the 1986 film Ferris Bueller's Day Off, the character Cameron Frye wears Howe's Red Wings jersey throughout most of the film, even though it is set in Chicago. Howe had provided one to the filmmakers personally.

Howe appears in a picture in The Simpsons episode "Bart the Lover". As a prank, Bart Simpson pretends to be a love interest for his teacher, Mrs. Krabappel, named Woodrow (after Woodrow Wilson). When Mrs. Krabappel asks "Woodrow" for a picture of himself, Bart sends her a picture of Howe. At the end of the episode, Howe's career statistics are shown.

In Season 3 of the NBC television crime drama series Good Girls, in an episode entitled "The Eye in Survivor", the character of Ruby (Retta) steals an autographed Stanley Cup Final game-worn Gordie Howe jersey from a sports bar only to have it appraised and learn that it is counterfeit.

In 2023, a children's book called Gordie's Skate, written by Saskatchewan historian Bill Waiser, was published. The book shares the story of Howe's family acquiring a pair of skates during the Great Depression in Saskatchewan, and how Howe had to share the pair with his sister.

=== Namesake ===
In 1993, a statue created by Michael Martin of Eston, Saskatchewan, was installed across from Midtown Plaza in Howe's hometown of Saskatoon, and then moved to what is now SaskTel Centre in 2005. Following his death, Howe's ashes along with wife Colleen were interred below the statue.

In May 2015, Canadian Prime Minister Stephen Harper and Michigan Governor Rick Snyder announced that a new international bridge spanning the Detroit River would be named in honour of Howe. The Gordie Howe International Bridge opened on July 24, 2026.

On June 27, 2016, it was announced that a bridge in Saskatoon would be named after Howe. There is also an arena and sports complex in Saskatoon named after Howe.

== Honours ==
- Howe was appointed as an Officer of the Order of Canada on June 25, 1971. This gave him the post-nominal letters "OC" for life.
- He was awarded the Canadian version of the Queen Elizabeth II Silver Jubilee Medal in 1977.
- He was the recipient of the Golden Plate Award of the American Academy of Achievement in 1978.
- He was awarded the induction medal by the Hartford Whalers Hockey Hall of Fame in 1989
- He was awarded the 125th Anniversary of the Confederation of Canada Medal in 1992.
- The Howe family received the Wayne Gretzky International Award for major contributions to the growth and advancement of hockey in the United States in 2000.
- He was awarded the Canadian version of the Queen Elizabeth II Golden Jubilee Medal in 2002.
- He was awarded the Canadian version of the Queen Elizabeth II Diamond Jubilee Medal in 2012.
- He was awarded the honorary degree of Doctor of Laws from the University of Regina in spring 1997.
- He was awarded the honorary degree of Doctor of Laws from the University of Saskatchewan on June 3, 2010.
- Gordie Howe was specifically honoured by then US President Barack Obama in his speech in the House of Commons Chamber in the Parliament of Canada on June 29, 2016, when Obama stated that "as Americans, we, too, celebrate the life of Mr. Hockey himself, the late, great Gordie Howe."

== Career statistics ==
=== Regular season and playoffs ===
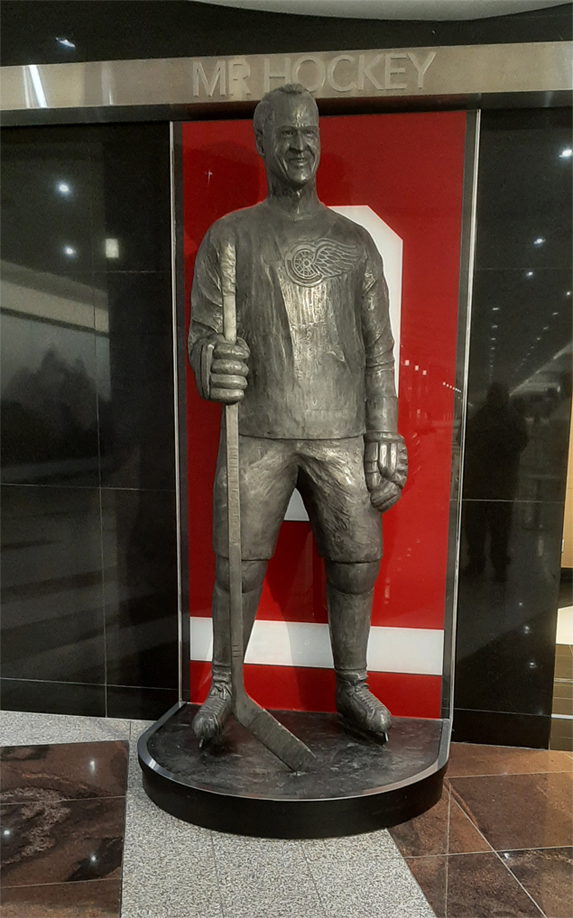
The Gordie Howe statue (unveiled in March 2017) in front of the Hockey Hall of Fame

Bold indicates led league

			Regular season					Playoffs
Season	Team	League	GP	G	A	Pts	PIM	GP	G	A	Pts	PIM
1945–46	Omaha Knights	USHL	52	22	26	48	53	6	2	1	3	15
1946–47	Detroit Red Wings	NHL	58	7	15	22	52	5	0	0	0	18
1947–48	Detroit Red Wings	NHL	60	16	28	44	63	10	1	1	2	11
1948–49	Detroit Red Wings	NHL	40	12	25	37	57	11	8	3	11	19
1949–50	Detroit Red Wings	NHL	70	35	33	68	69	1	0	0	0	7
1950–51	Detroit Red Wings	NHL	70	**43**	**43**	**86**	74	6	4	3	7	4
1951–52	Detroit Red Wings	NHL	70	**47**	39	**86**	78	8	2	5	7	2
1952–53	Detroit Red Wings	NHL	70	**49**	**46**	**95**	57	6	2	5	7	2
1953–54	Detroit Red Wings	NHL	70	33	**48**	**81**	109	12	4	5	9	31
1954–55	Detroit Red Wings	NHL	64	29	33	62	68	11	9	11	20	24
1955–56	Detroit Red Wings	NHL	70	38	41	79	100	10	3	9	12	8
1956–57	Detroit Red Wings	NHL	70	**44**	45	**89**	72	5	2	5	7	6
1957–58	Detroit Red Wings	NHL	64	33	44	77	40	4	1	1	2	0
1958–59	Detroit Red Wings	NHL	70	32	46	78	57	—	—	—	—	—
1959–60	Detroit Red Wings	NHL	70	28	45	73	46	6	1	5	6	4
1960–61	Detroit Red Wings	NHL	64	23	49	72	30	11	4	11	15	10
1961–62	Detroit Red Wings	NHL	70	33	44	77	54	—	—	—	—	—
1962–63	Detroit Red Wings	NHL	70	**38**	48	**86**	100	11	7	9	16	22
1963–64	Detroit Red Wings	NHL	69	26	47	73	70	14	9	10	19	16
1964–65	Detroit Red Wings	NHL	70	29	47	76	104	7	4	2	6	20
1965–66	Detroit Red Wings	NHL	70	29	46	75	83	12	4	6	10	12
1966–67	Detroit Red Wings	NHL	69	25	40	65	53	—	—	—	—	—
1967–68	Detroit Red Wings	NHL	74	39	43	82	53	—	—	—	—	—
1968–69	Detroit Red Wings	NHL	76	44	59	103	58	—	—	—	—	—
1969–70	Detroit Red Wings	NHL	76	31	40	71	58	4	2	0	2	2
1970–71	Detroit Red Wings	NHL	63	23	29	52	38	—	—	—	—	—
1973–74	Houston Aeros	WHA	70	31	69	100	46	13	3	14	17	34
1974–75	Houston Aeros	WHA	75	34	65	99	84	13	8	12	20	20
1975–76	Houston Aeros	WHA	78	32	70	102	76	17	4	8	12	31
1976–77	Houston Aeros	WHA	62	24	44	68	57	11	5	3	8	11
1977–78	New England Whalers	WHA	76	34	62	96	85	14	5	5	10	15
1978–79	New England Whalers	WHA	58	19	24	43	51	10	3	1	4	4
1979–80	Hartford Whalers	NHL	80	15	26	41	42	3	1	1	2	2
1997–98	Detroit Vipers	IHL	1	0	0	0	0	—	—	—	—	—
NHL totals			1,767	801	1,049	1,850	1,685	157	68	92	160	220
WHA totals			419	174	334	508	399	78	28	43	71	115
Combined NHL/WHA totals			2,186	975	1,383	2,358	2,084	235	96	135	231	335

=== International ===
Year	Team	Event	GP	G	A	Pts	PIM
1974	Canada	SS74	7	3	4	7	2

== Awards ==
NHL

Award	Year(s)
Art Ross Trophy	1951, 1952, 1953, 1954, 1957, 1963
Goal scoring leader	1951, 1952, 1953, 1957, 1963
Hart Memorial Trophy	1952, 1953, 1957, 1958, 1960, 1963
NHL All-Star Game	1948, 1949, 1950, 1951, 1952, 1953, 1954, 1955, 1957, 1958, 1959, 1960, 1961, 1962, 1963, 1964, 1965, 1967, 1968, 1969, 1970, 1971, 1980
NHL First All-Star Team	1951, 1952, 1953, 1954, 1957, 1958, 1960, 1963, 1966, 1968, 1969, 1970
NHL Second All-Star Team	1949, 1950, 1956, 1959, 1961, 1962, 1964, 1965, 1967
Stanley Cup	1950, 1952, 1954, 1955

WHA

Award	Year(s)
Avco World Trophy	1974, 1975
Gary L. Davidson Award	1974
WHA First All-Star Team	1974, 1975

== Records ==
- Most NHL regular season games played with a single team: 1,687
- Most NHL and WHA regular season games played: 2,186
- Most NHL and WHA regular season and playoff games played: 2,421
- Most NHL and WHA goals regular season 975
- Most NHL seasons played: 26 (tied with Chris Chelios)
- Most NHL and WHA seasons played: 32
- Most NHL regular season goals by a right winger: 801
- Most NHL regular season points by a father/son combo (with son Mark): 2,592
- Most consecutive NHL 20-goal seasons: 22 (1949–1971)
- First player to score over 1,000 goals (WHA and NHL, regular season and playoff combined)
- First player to reach 1,500 games played in NHL history.
- Most times leading NHL playoffs in scoring (six times)
- Oldest player to win MVP in NHL/WHA: 46 years old
- Oldest player to play in NHL: 52 years, 11 days (no other player has played past the age of 48)
- First in Red Wings history in points, goals and games played, second in assists
- Most NHL All-Star Game appearances: 23
- From 1961 until being surpassed by Patrick Marleau in April 2021, Howe held the record for most NHL regular season games played.
- From 1980 until being surpassed by Jaromír Jágr in 2018, Howe held the record for most points for an NHL player after turning 40 (267)

== See also ==
- List of Detroit Red Wings award winners
- List of family relations in the NHL
- List of ice hockey line nicknames
- List of members of the Hockey Hall of Fame
- List of NHL players with 1,000 games played
- List of NHL players with 1,000 points
- List of NHL players with 500 goals
- List of NHL statistical leaders
- Power forward (ice hockey)
- List of Canadian sports personalities

Awards and achievements
Preceded by Inaugural	NHL Lifetime Achievement Award; 2008	Succeeded by Jean Béliveau
Preceded by Red Kelly	Detroit Red Wings captain 1958–62	Succeeded by Alex Delvecchio
Preceded by Milt Schmidt; Jean Béliveau; Andy Bathgate; Jacques Plante	Winner of the Hart Memorial Trophy; 1952, 1953; 1957, 1958; 1960; 1963	Succeeded by Al Rollins; Andy Bathgate; Bernie Geoffrion; Jean Beliveau
Preceded by Ted Lindsay; Jean Béliveau; Bobby Hull	Winner of the Art Ross Trophy; 1951, 1952, 1953, 1954; 1957; 1963	Succeeded by Bernie Geoffrion; Dickie Moore; Stan Mikita
Preceded by Maurice Richard; Jean Béliveau; Bobby Hull	Winner of the Maurice "Rocket" Richard Trophy; 1951, 1952, 1953; 1957; 1963	Succeeded by Maurice Richard; Dickie Moore; Bobby Hull
