= Scotty Morrison =

Canadian National Hockey League referee and vice-president (1930–2026)

- Hockey Hall of Fame, 1999 (Builder)
- Born: April 22, 1930 Montreal, Quebec, Canada
- Died: February 25, 2026 (aged 95) Invermere, British Columbia, Canada

Ian "Scotty" Morrison (April 22, 1930 – February 25, 2026) was a Canadian National Hockey League referee and vice-president, and president and chairman of the Hockey Hall of Fame.

Morrison played junior hockey in Quebec and then became a referee, working in junior and senior amateur leagues. He moved to Vancouver to work in the Western Hockey League, and from there was hired by the NHL at the age of 24, at that time the youngest referee in league history.

He left the NHL in 1955 and became referee-in-chief of the Western Hockey League, while also working games as a referee. He also worked in sales, and in that job was transferred to Toronto in 1964. In June 1965, Morrison returned to the NHL as referee-in-chief. His title became vice-president of officiating in 1981. In 1986, Morrison became the NHL's vice-president of project development, assigned to the Hockey Hall of Fame where he was made president. He served in that role until 1991 when he became chairman of the Hall, while his NHL vice-president title was dropped in 1992. Morrison led the Hall of Fame through its relocation from the grounds of Exhibition Place to its present site in downtown Toronto, and retired in 1998.

Morrison was inducted into the Hockey Hall of Fame in the builders' category in 1999. He received the Wayne Gretzky International Award in 2001. He became a Stanley Cup trustee in 2002 and served in that role until 2023.

== Background ==
Morrison's son, Perry, was one of 84 workers to die aboard the oil-drilling rig Ocean Ranger when it sank with no survivors off the coast of Newfoundland in 1982. He was also the grandfather of Canadian Olympic alpine skier Cassidy Gray.

He was well known in Haliburton, Ontario for his community service. He chaired an annual hockey tournament for many years called the Scotty Morrison Charity Hockey Tournament, which raised over $700,000 for Community Care Haliburton County. In 2016, he was awarded a Sovereign's Medal for Volunteers at the Pinestone by the local Haliburton community.

Morrison died in Invermere, British Columbia on February 25, 2026, at the age of 95.

Preceded by Willard Estey	Stanley Cup Trustee; 2002–2023	Succeeded by Gary Meagher
