= United States Hockey Hall of Fame =

Ice hockey hall of fame in the United States

Coordinates: 47°28′17″N 92°31′42″W

United States Hockey Hall of Fame Museum

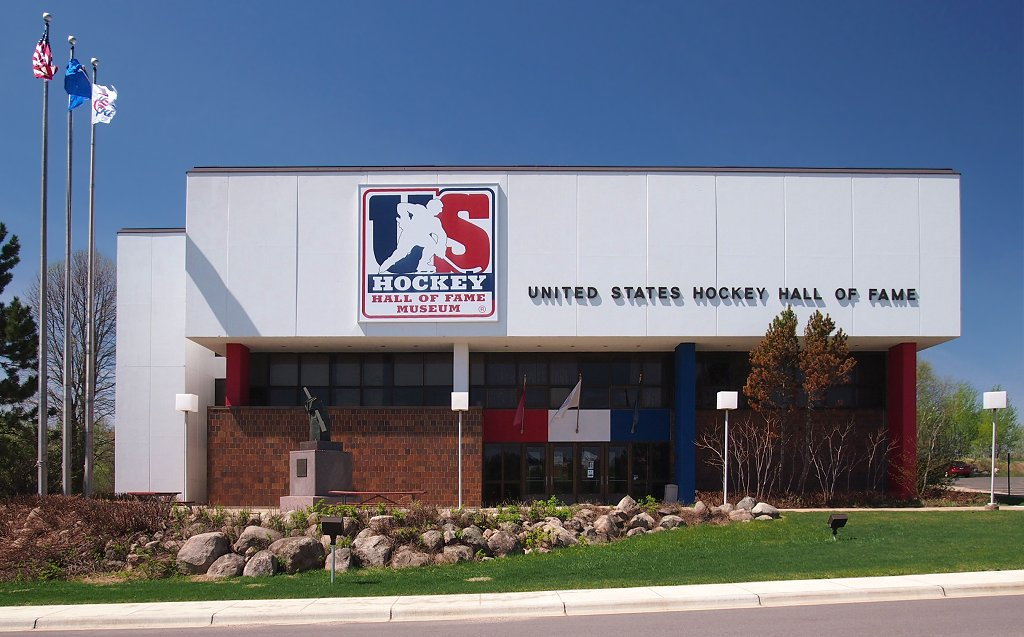
- United States Hockey Hall of Fame Museum in 2014
- Established: 1973
- Location: 801 Hat Trick Avenue, Eveleth, Minnesota
- Type: Ice hockey museum
- Director: Doug Palazzari
- Curator: Tom Sersha
- Website: ushockeyhall.com

The United States Hockey Hall of Fame is a hockey museum established in 1973 with the goal of preserving the history of ice hockey in the United States. The museum also has the goal of recognizing the extraordinary contributions of select players, coaches, administrators, officials and teams. Currently, it is located in Eveleth, Minnesota, an iron mining town in northern Minnesota.

== Inductees ==
With the four-member induction Class of 2020, there are now 192 enshrined members. New members are inducted annually based on their contributions to hockey in the United States during the course of their careers.

Each year, nominations are solicited by USA Hockey from those willing to substantiate the candidacy of a particular individual or team for induction from Jan. 1 through March 31. All nominations are forwarded to the U.S. Hockey Hall of Fame Selection Committee for review. After a thorough evaluation of each candidate, the selection committee conducts a vote to select the newest members of the Hall of Fame.

== Museum exhibits ==
The United States Hockey Hall of Fame Museum, sometimes called the "National Shrine of American Hockey," is dedicated to honoring the legends of the sport game and showcasing precious U.S. hockey memories. Opened in 1973 in Eveleth, Minnesota, the unique facility is driven by the mission to preserve and showcase the USA's legacy of hockey traditions.

The museums hosts the "Great Wall of Fame" where in which it displays the inductee plaques, historical displays representing levels of American hockey, video presentations, interactive experiences and traveling outreach programs. The Hockey Hall of Fame Museum seeks to get "the true spirit and excitement of the sport is captured and the many traditions are proudly presented to hockey fans throughout the country."

In downtown Eveleth, there is also the "world's largest authentic hockey stick". It is a Christian Brothers hockey stick that measures over 110 feet (34 m) and 10,000 pounds (4,500 kg).

The Hall of Fame later established the Wayne Gretzky International Award in 1999, as a lifetime achievement award to honor international individuals who have made major contributions to the growth and advancement of ice hockey in the United States.
