= 1948–49 Montreal Canadiens season =

NHL hockey team season

1948–49 Montreal Canadiens
- League: 3rd NHL
- 1948–49 record: 28–23–9
- Home record: 19–8–3
- Road record: 9–15–6
- Goals for: 152
- Goals against: 126

Team information
- General manager: Frank J. Selke
- Coach: Dick Irvin
- Captain: Emile Bouchard
- Arena: Montreal Forum

Team leaders
- Goals: Billy Reay (22)
- Assists: Billy Reay (23)
- Points: Billy Reay (45)
- Penalty minutes: Murph Chamberlain (111)
- Wins: Bill Durnan (28)
- Goals against average: Bill Durnan (2.10)

The 1948–49 Montreal Canadiens season was the 40th season in club history. The Montreal Canadiens were eliminated in the semi-finals against the Detroit Red Wings 4 games to 3.

== Regular season ==
Bill Durnan set a long-standing modern NHL record between February 26 and March 6, 1949, when he amassed four consecutive shutouts, not allowing a goal over a span of 309 minutes, 21 seconds. This record was not surpassed until 2003–04, when Brian Boucher, then of the Phoenix Coyotes, broke it.

=== Final standings ===
National Hockey League
		GP	W	L	T	GF	GA	DIFF	Pts
1	Detroit Red Wings	60	34	19	7	195	145	+50	75
2	Boston Bruins	60	29	23	8	178	163	+15	66
3	Montreal Canadiens	60	28	23	9	152	126	+26	65
4	Toronto Maple Leafs	60	22	25	13	147	161	−14	57
5	Chicago Black Hawks	60	21	31	8	173	211	−38	50
6	New York Rangers	60	18	31	11	133	172	−39	47

=== Record vs. opponents ===
1948–49 NHL Records
Team	BOS	CHI	DET	MTL	NYR	TOR
Boston	—	6–5–1	5–4–3	5–6–1	8–2–2	5–6–1
Chicago	5–6–1	—	3–9	3–7–2	6–5–1	4–4–4
Detroit	4–5–3	9–3	—	7–4–1	7–4–1	7–3–2
Montreal	6–5–1	7–3–2	4–7–1	—	5–4–3	6–4–2
New York	2–8–2	5–6–1	4–7–1	4–5–3	—	3–5–4
Toronto	6–5–1	4–4–4	3–7–2	4–6–2	5–3–4	—

== Schedule and results ==
1948–49 regular season
October

Game	Result	Date	Score	Opponent	Record
1	T	October 14, 1948	1–1	New York Rangers (1948–49)	0–0–1
2	W	October 16, 1948	8–2	Chicago Black Hawks (1948–49)	1–0–1
3	W	October 21, 1948	5–0	Toronto Maple Leafs (1948–49)	2–0–1
4	T	October 23, 1948	0–0	Detroit Red Wings (1948–49)	2–0–2
5	L	October 27, 1948	2–3	@ Toronto Maple Leafs (1948–49)	2–1–2
6	T	October 30, 1948	3–3	Boston Bruins (1948–49)	2–1–3
7	L	October 31, 1948	1–4	@ Detroit Red Wings (1948–49)	2–2–3

November

Game	Result	Date	Score	Opponent	Record
8	W	November 6, 1948	2–0	Detroit Red Wings (1948–49)	3–2–3
9	W	November 11, 1948	4–1	Chicago Black Hawks (1948–49)	4–2–3
10	W	November 13, 1948	3–1	@ New York Rangers (1948–49)	5–2–3
11	L	November 14, 1948	2–3	@ Boston Bruins (1948–49)	5–3–3
12	L	November 17, 1948	3–4	@ Chicago Black Hawks (1948–49)	5–4–3
13	W	November 21, 1948	3–0	@ Detroit Red Wings (1948–49)	6–4–3
14	T	November 24, 1948	3–3	@ Toronto Maple Leafs (1948–49)	6–4–4
15	L	November 25, 1948	0–2	Toronto Maple Leafs (1948–49)	6–5–4
16	L	November 27, 1948	0–2	Boston Bruins (1948–49)	6–6–4

December

Game	Result	Date	Score	Opponent	Record
17	W	December 4, 1948	3–1	New York Rangers (1948–49)	7–6–4
18	L	December 5, 1948	1–2	@ Boston Bruins (1948–49)	7–7–4
19	L	December 11, 1948	2–5	Chicago Black Hawks (1948–49)	7–8–4
20	T	December 12, 1948	4–4	@ Chicago Black Hawks (1948–49)	7–8–5
21	W	December 15, 1948	4–2	@ Boston Bruins (1948–49)	8–8–5
22	W	December 18, 1948	5–3	Detroit Red Wings (1948–49)	9–8–5
23	L	December 19, 1948	2–3	@ New York Rangers (1948–49)	9–9–5
24	W	December 23, 1948	4–2	Boston Bruins (1948–49)	10–9–5
25	L	December 25, 1948	0–2	New York Rangers (1948–49)	10–10–5
26	L	December 26, 1948	1–3	@ Detroit Red Wings (1948–49)	10–11–5
27	W	December 30, 1948	3–2	Toronto Maple Leafs (1948–49)	11–11–5

January

Game	Result	Date	Score	Opponent	Record
28	L	January 1, 1949	3–5	@ Toronto Maple Leafs (1948–49)	11–12–5
29	W	January 6, 1949	7–2	Chicago Black Hawks (1948–49)	12–12–5
30	L	January 8, 1949	1–4	Detroit Red Wings (1948–49)	12–13–5
31	T	January 9, 1949	1–1	@ New York Rangers (1948–49)	12–13–6
32	W	January 12, 1949	5–3	@ Boston Bruins (1948–49)	13–13–6
33	W	January 15, 1949	7–1	Chicago Black Hawks (1948–49)	14–13–6
34	L	January 16, 1949	2–3	@ Detroit Red Wings (1948–49)	14–14–6
35	W	January 19, 1949	4–1	@ Toronto Maple Leafs (1948–49)	15–14–6
36	W	January 20, 1949	2–1	New York Rangers (1948–49)	16–14–6
37	W	January 22, 1949	4–2	Boston Bruins (1948–49)	17–14–6
38	L	January 23, 1949	0–3	@ Boston Bruins (1948–49)	17–15–6
39	W	January 26, 1949	3–2	@ Chicago Black Hawks (1948–49)	18–15–6
40	L	January 29, 1949	2–5	Detroit Red Wings (1948–49)	18–16–6
41	L	January 30, 1949	0–9	@ New York Rangers (1948–49)	18–17–6

February

Game	Result	Date	Score	Opponent	Record
42	L	February 3, 1949	1–4	Toronto Maple Leafs (1948–49)	18–18–6
43	L	February 5, 1949	2–3	Boston Bruins (1948–49)	18–19–6
44	L	February 6, 1949	0–1	@ Detroit Red Wings (1948–49)	18–20–6
45	T	February 9, 1949	2–2	@ Toronto Maple Leafs (1948–49)	18–20–7
46	L	February 13, 1949	3–4	@ Chicago Black Hawks (1948–49)	18–21–7
47	W	February 17, 1949	3–0	Toronto Maple Leafs (1948–49)	19–21–7
48	W	February 19, 1949	3–1	New York Rangers (1948–49)	20–21–7
49	L	February 20, 1949	2–3	@ New York Rangers (1948–49)	20–22–7
50	W	February 24, 1949	3–1	@ Chicago Black Hawks (1948–49)	21–22–7
51	W	February 26, 1949	1–0	Detroit Red Wings (1948–49)	22–22–7

March

Game	Result	Date	Score	Opponent	Record
52	W	March 2, 1949	2–0	@ Toronto Maple Leafs (1948–49)	23–22–7
53	W	March 5, 1949	4–0	Boston Bruins (1948–49)	24–22–7
54	W	March 6, 1949	1–0	@ Boston Bruins (1948–49)	25–22–7
55	T	March 9, 1949	2–2	@ Chicago Black Hawks (1948–49)	25–22–8
56	W	March 12, 1949	3–0	New York Rangers (1948–49)	26–22–8
57	T	March 13, 1949	1–1	@ New York Rangers (1948–49)	26–22–9
58	W	March 17, 1949	3–1	Toronto Maple Leafs (1948–49)	27–22–9
59	W	March 19, 1949	5–1	Chicago Black Hawks (1948–49)	28–22–9
60	L	March 20, 1949	1–2	@ Detroit Red Wings (1948–49)	28–23–9

Legend: Win (2 points) Loss (0 points) Tie (1 point)

== Playoffs ==
The Canadiens would meet the Detroit Red Wings in the first round of the playoffs.

Date	Away	Score	Home	Score	Notes
March 22	Montreal Canadiens	1	Detroit Red Wings	2	OT
March 24	Montreal Canadiens	4	Detroit Red Wings	3	OT
March 26	Detroit Red Wings	2	Montreal Canadiens	3	
March 29	Detroit Red Wings	3	Montreal Canadiens	1	
March 31	Montreal Canadiens	1	Detroit Red Wings	3	
April 2	Detroit Red Wings	1	Montreal Canadiens	3	
April 5	Montreal Canadiens	1	Detroit Red Wings	3	

Detroit won the best-of-seven series 4 games to 3.

== Player statistics ==
=== Regular season ===
==== Scoring ====
Player	Pos	GP	G	A	Pts	PIM
Billy Reay	C	60	22	23	45	33
Maurice Richard	RW	59	20	18	38	110
Joe Carveth	RW	60	15	22	37	8
Elmer Lach	C	36	11	18	29	59
Ken Mosdell	C	60	17	9	26	50
Glen Harmon	D	59	8	12	20	44
Norm Dussault	C	47	9	8	17	6
Rip Riopelle	LW	48	10	6	16	34
Doug Harvey	D	55	3	13	16	87
Ken Reardon	D	46	3	13	16	103
Roger Leger	D	28	6	7	13	10
Murph Chamberlain	LW	54	5	8	13	111
Bob Fillion	LW	59	3	9	12	14
Gerry Plamondon	LW	27	5	5	10	8
Leo Gravelle	RW	36	4	6	10	6
Tod Campeau	C	26	3	7	10	12
Hal Laycoe	D	51	3	5	8	31
George Robertson	LW/C	30	2	5	7	6
Emile Bouchard	D	27	3	3	6	42
Ed Dorohoy	C/LW	16	0	0	0	6
Bill Durnan	G	60	0	0	0	0
Jacques Locas	RW	3	0	0	0	0
Bud MacPherson	D	3	0	0	0	2

==== Goaltending ====
Player	MIN	GP	W	L	T	GA	GAA	SO
Bill Durnan	3600	60	28	23	9	126	2.10	10
Team:	3600	60	28	23	9	126	2.10	10

=== Playoffs ===
==== Scoring ====
Player	Pos	GP	G	A	Pts	PIM
Gerry Plamondon	LW	7	5	1	6	0
Billy Reay	C	7	1	5	6	4
Leo Gravelle	RW	7	2	1	3	0
Maurice Richard	RW	7	2	1	3	14
Glen Harmon	D	7	1	1	2	4
Murdo MacKay	RW/C	6	1	1	2	0
Ken Mosdell	C	7	1	1	2	4
Rip Riopelle	LW	7	1	1	2	2
Joe Carveth	RW	7	0	1	1	8
Bob Fillion	LW	7	0	1	1	4
Doug Harvey	D	7	0	1	1	10
Hal Laycoe	D	7	0	1	1	13
Roger Leger	D	5	0	1	1	2
Emile Bouchard	D	7	0	0	0	6
Tod Campeau	C	1	0	0	0	0
Murph Chamberlain	LW	4	0	0	0	8
Floyd Curry	RW	2	0	0	0	2
Bill Durnan	G	7	0	0	0	0
Norm Dussault	C	2	0	0	0	0
Elmer Lach	C	1	0	0	0	4
Ken Reardon	D	7	0	0	0	18

==== Goaltending ====
Player	MIN	GP	W	L	GA	GAA	SO
Bill Durnan	468	7	3	4	17	2.18	0
Team:	468	7	3	4	17	2.18	0

Note:

Pos = Position;GP = Games played; G = Goals; A = Assists; Pts = Points; PIM = Penalty minutes; +/- = Plus/minus; PPG = Power-play goals; SHG = Short-handed goals; GWG = Game-winning goals
Pos = Position;GP = Games played; Min, TOI = Minutes played; W = Wins; L = Losses; T,T/OT = Ties; OTL = Overtime losses; GA = Goals-against; GAA = Goals-against average; SO = Shutouts; SA = Shots against; SV = Shots saved;SV% = Save percentage;

== Awards and records ==
- Bill Durnan, Vezina Trophy
- Bill Durnan, Goaltender, NHL First Team All-Star
- Glen Harmon, Defence, NHL Second Team All-Star
- Ken Reardon, Defence, NHL Second Team All-Star
- Maurice Richard, Right Wing, NHL First Team All-Star

== See also ==
- 1948–49 NHL season
