= List of Detroit Red Wings seasons =

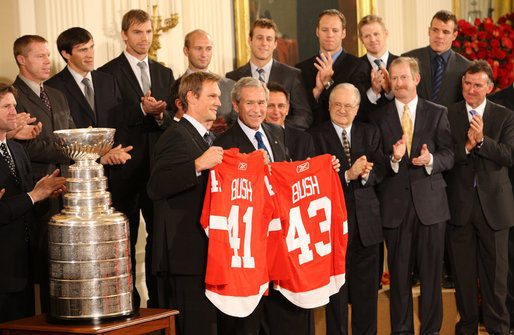
The 2008 Stanley Cup champion Red Wings present two jerseys to U.S. President George W. Bush.

The Detroit Red Wings are a professional ice hockey team based in Detroit, Michigan. They are members of the Atlantic Division in the Eastern Conference of the National Hockey League (NHL) and are one of the Original Six teams of the league. Founded in 1926, the team was known as the Cougars from then until 1930. For the 1930–31 and 1931–32 seasons the team was called the Falcons, and in 1932 changed their name to the Red Wings. The 2025–26 season was the 100th season for the Detroit franchise. Since their founding, the Red Wings have won 3,177 regular season games, accumulated 19 division championships and six conference championships, led the league in points 18 times, appeared in the Stanley Cup playoffs 64 times, and won 11 Stanley Cup titles.

Detroit first qualified for the playoffs in 1929 where they lost to the Toronto Maple Leafs 7–2 in total goals scored. In the 38 seasons from 1929 to 1966 the team missed the playoffs only six times. They appeared in the Stanley Cup Final 18 times during this period, winning the Stanley Cup in seven of those opportunities, with their championships coming in 1936, 1937, 1943, 1950, 1952, 1954, and 1955. Their last Finals appearance of this era came in 1966 when they lost in six games to the Montreal Canadiens. The Red Wings then experienced a period, from 1967 until 1983, when they made the playoffs only twice, winning only one series, beating the Atlanta Flames two games to none in 1978.

The Red Wings returned to the playoffs in 1984 where they suffered a first round defeat to the St. Louis Blues. They made the playoffs in 25 consecutive seasons from 1991 to 2016 (not counting the cancelled 2004–05 season). In 1995, they made their first return to the Finals since 1966, but they were swept by the New Jersey Devils in four games. In 1997 they made it back to the Finals, winning the series in a four-game sweep over the Philadelphia Flyers. They repeated as champions in the following season with another four-game sweep, this time over the Washington Capitals. Their most recent championships were in 2002 and 2008, with their most recent Finals appearance in 2009 where they lost to the Pittsburgh Penguins. The Red Wings currently have the longest playoff drought in the NHL, going ten consecutive seasons without making the playoffs.

== Table key ==
Key of colors and symbols
Color/symbol	Explanation
†	Stanley Cup champions
‡	Conference champions
↑	Division champions
#	Led league in points

Key of terms and abbreviations
Term or abbreviation	Definition
Finish	Final position in division or league standings
GP	Number of games played
W	Number of wins
L	Number of losses
T	Number of ties
OT	Number of losses in overtime (since the 1999–2000 season)
Pts	Number of points
GF	Goals for (goals scored by the Red Wings)
GA	Goals against (goals scored by the Red Wings' opponents)
—	Does not apply
TG	Two-game total goals series

== Year by year ==
Year by year listing of all seasons played by the Detroit Red Wings
NHL season	Franchise season	Conference	Division	Regular season									Postseason						
NHL season	Franchise season	Conference	Division	Finish	GP	W	L	T	OT	Pts	GF	GA	GP	W	L	T	GF	GA	Result
Detroit Cougars^{[a]}
1926–27	1926–27	—	American^{[b]}	5th	44	12	28	4	—	28	76	105	—	—	—	—	—	—	Did not qualify
1927–28	1927–28	—	American	4th	44	19	19	6	—	44	88	79	—	—	—	—	—	—	Did not qualify
1928–29	1928–29	—	American	3rd	44	19	16	9	—	47	72	63	2	0	2	0	2	7	Lost quarterfinals to Toronto Maple Leafs, 2–7 (TG)
1929–30	1929–30	—	American	4th	44	14	24	6	—	34	117	133	—	—	—	—	—	—	Did not qualify
Detroit Falcons^{[c]}
1930–31	1930–31	—	American	4th	44	16	21	7	—	39	102	105	—	—	—	—	—	—	Did not qualify
1931–32	1931–32	—	American	3rd	48	18	20	10	—	46	95	108	2	0	1	1	1	3	Lost quarterfinals to Montreal Maroons, 1–3 (TG)
Detroit Red Wings^{[d]}
1932–33	1932–33	—	American	2nd	48	25	15	8	—	58	111	93	4	2	2	0	8	8	Won quarterfinals vs. Montreal Maroons, 5–2 (TG); Lost semifinals to New York Rangers, 3–6 (TG)
1933–34	1933–34	—	American↑	1st	48	24	14	10	—	58	113	98	9	4	5	0	18	21	Won semifinals vs. Toronto Maple Leafs, 3–2; Lost Stanley Cup Final to Chicago Black Hawks, 1–3
1934–35	1934–35	—	American	4th	48	19	22	7	—	45	118	88	—	—	—	—	—	—	Did not qualify
1935–36	1935–36	—	American↑	1st	48	24	16	8	—	56#	124	103	7	6	1	0	24	12	Won semifinals vs. Montreal Maroons, 3–0; Won Stanley Cup Final vs. Toronto Maple Leafs, 3–1†
1936–37	1936–37	—	American↑	1st	48	25	14	9	—	59#	128	102	10	6	4	0	22	16	Won semifinals vs. Montreal Canadiens, 3–2; Won Stanley Cup Final vs. New York Rangers, 3–2†
1937–38	1937–38	—	American	4th	48	12	25	11	—	35	99	133	—	—	—	—	—	—	Did not qualify
1938–39	1938–39	—	—^{[e]}	5th	48	18	24	6	—	42	107	128	6	3	3	0	16	15	Won quarterfinals vs. Montreal Canadiens, 2–1; Lost semifinals to Toronto Maple Leafs, 1–2
1939–40	1939–40	—	—	5th	48	16	26	6	—	38	90	126	5	2	3	0	11	12	Won quarterfinals vs. New York Americans, 2–1; Lost semifinals to Toronto Maple Leafs, 0–2
1940–41	1940–41	—	—	3rd	48	21	16	11	—	53	112	102	9	4	5	0	17	20	Won quarterfinals vs. New York Rangers, 2–1; Won semifinals vs. Chicago Black Hawks, 2–0; Lost Stanley Cup Final to Boston Bruins, 0–4
1941–42	1941–42	—	—	5th	48	19	25	4	—	42	140	147	12	7	5	0	36	38	Won quarterfinals vs. Montreal Canadiens, 2–1; Won semifinals vs. Boston Bruins, 2–0; Lost Stanley Cup Final to Toronto Maple Leafs, 3–4
1942–43	1942–43	—	—	1st	50	25	14	11	—	61#	169	124	10	8	2	0	36	22	Won semifinals vs. Toronto Maple Leafs, 4–2; Won Stanley Cup Final vs. Boston Bruins, 4–0†
1943–44	1943–44	—	—	2nd	50	26	18	6	—	58	214	177	5	1	4	0	8	17	Lost semifinals to Chicago Black Hawks, 1–4
1944–45	1944–45	—	—	2nd	50	31	14	5	—	67	218	161	14	7	7	0	31	31	Won semifinals vs. Boston Bruins, 4–3; Lost Stanley Cup Final to Toronto Maple Leafs, 3–4
1945–46	1945–46	—	—	4th	50	20	20	10	—	50	146	159	5	1	4	0	10	16	Lost semifinals to Boston Bruins, 1–4
1946–47	1946–47	—	—	4th	60	22	27	11	—	55	190	193	5	1	4	0	14	18	Lost semifinals to Toronto Maple Leafs, 1–4
1947–48	1947–48	—	—	2nd	60	30	18	12	—	72	187	148	10	4	6	0	24	30	Won semifinals vs. New York Rangers, 4–2; Lost Stanley Cup Final to Toronto Maple Leafs, 0–4
1948–49	1948–49	—	—	1st	60	34	19	7	—	75#	195	145	11	4	7	0	22	26	Won semifinals vs. Montreal Canadiens, 4–3; Lost Stanley Cup Final to Toronto Maple Leafs, 0–4
1949–50	1949–50	—	—	1st	70	37	19	14	—	88#	229	164	14	8	6	0	32	28	Won semifinals vs. Toronto Maple Leafs, 4–3; Won Stanley Cup Final vs. New York Rangers, 4–3†
1950–51	1950–51	—	—	1st	70	44	13	13	—	101#	236	139	6	2	4	0	12	13	Lost semifinals to Montreal Canadiens, 2–4
1951–52	1951–52	—	—	1st	70	44	14	12	—	100#	215	133	8	8	0	0	24	5	Won semifinals vs. Toronto Maple Leafs, 4–0; Won Stanley Cup Final vs. Montreal Canadiens, 4–0†
1952–53	1952–53	—	—	1st	70	36	16	18	—	90#	222	133	6	2	4	0	21	21	Lost semifinals to Boston Bruins, 2–4
1953–54	1953–54	—	—	1st	70	37	19	14	—	88#	191	132	12	8	4	0	29	20	Won semifinals vs. Toronto Maple Leafs, 4–1; Won Stanley Cup Final vs. Montreal Canadiens, 4–3†
1954–55	1954–55	—	—	1st	70	42	17	11	—	95#	204	134	11	8	3	0	41	26	Won semifinals vs. Toronto Maple Leafs, 4–0; Won Stanley Cup Final vs. Montreal Canadiens, 4–3†
1955–56	1955–56	—	—	2nd	70	30	24	16	—	76	183	148	10	5	5	0	23	28	Won semifinals vs. Toronto Maple Leafs, 4–1; Lost Stanley Cup Final to Montreal Canadiens, 1–4
1956–57	1956–57	—	—	1st	70	38	20	12	—	88#	198	157	5	1	4	0	14	15	Lost semifinals to Boston Bruins, 1–4
1957–58	1957–58	—	—	3rd	70	29	29	12	—	70	176	207	4	0	4	0	6	19	Lost semifinals to Montreal Canadiens, 0–4
1958–59	1958–59	—	—	6th	70	25	37	8	—	58	167	218	—	—	—	—	—	—	Did not qualify
1959–60	1959–60	—	—	4th	70	26	29	15	—	67	186	197	6	2	4	0	16	20	Lost semifinals to Toronto Maple Leafs, 2–4
1960–61	1960–61	—	—	4th	70	25	29	16	—	66	195	215	11	6	5	0	27	27	Won semifinals vs. Toronto Maple Leafs, 4–1; Lost Stanley Cup Final to Chicago Black Hawks, 2–4
1961–62	1961–62	—	—	5th	70	23	33	14	—	60	184	219	—	—	—	—	—	—	Did not qualify
1962–63	1962–63	—	—	4th	70	32	25	13	—	77	200	194	11	5	6	0	35	36	Won semifinals vs. Chicago Black Hawks, 4–2; Lost Stanley Cup Final to Toronto Maple Leafs, 1–4
1963–64	1963–64	—	—	4th	70	30	29	11	—	71	191	204	14	7	7	0	41	40	Won semifinals vs. Chicago Black Hawks, 4–3; Lost Stanley Cup Final to Toronto Maple Leafs, 3–4
1964–65	1964–65	—	—	1st	70	40	23	7	—	87#	224	175	7	3	4	0	19	23	Lost semifinals to Chicago Black Hawks, 3–4
1965–66	1965–66	—	—	4th	70	31	27	12	—	74	221	194	12	6	6	0	36	28	Won semifinals vs. Chicago Black Hawks, 4–2; Lost Stanley Cup Final to Montreal Canadiens, 2–4
1966–67	1966–67	—	—	5th	70	27	39	4	—	58	212	241	—	—	—	—	—	—	Did not qualify
1967–68	1967–68	—	East^{[f]}	6th	74	27	35	12	—	66	245	257	—	—	—	—	—	—	Did not qualify
1968–69	1968–69	—	East	5th	76	33	31	12	—	78	239	221	—	—	—	—	—	—	Did not qualify
1969–70	1969–70	—	East	3rd	76	40	21	15	—	95	246	199	4	0	4	0	8	16	Lost quarterfinals to Chicago Black Hawks, 0–4
1970–71	1970–71	—	East	7th	78	22	45	11	—	55	209	308	—	—	—	—	—	—	Did not qualify
1971–72	1971–72	—	East	5th	78	33	35	10	—	76	261	262	—	—	—	—	—	—	Did not qualify
1972–73	1972–73	—	East	5th	78	37	29	12	—	86	265	243	—	—	—	—	—	—	Did not qualify
1973–74	1973–74	—	East	6th	78	29	39	10	—	68	255	319	—	—	—	—	—	—	Did not qualify
1974–75	1974–75	Wales^{[g]}	Norris	4th	80	23	45	12	—	58	259	335	—	—	—	—	—	—	Did not qualify
1975–76	1975–76	Wales	Norris	4th	80	26	44	10	—	62	226	300	—	—	—	—	—	—	Did not qualify
1976–77	1976–77	Wales	Norris	5th	80	16	55	9	—	41	183	309	—	—	—	—	—	—	Did not qualify
1977–78	1977–78	Wales	Norris	2nd	80	32	34	14	—	78	252	266	7	3	4	0	18	29	Won preliminary round vs. Atlanta Flames, 2–0; Lost quarterfinals to Montreal Canadiens, 1–4
1978–79	1978–79	Wales	Norris	5th	80	23	41	16	—	62	252	295	—	—	—	—	—	—	Did not qualify
1979–80	1979–80	Wales	Norris	5th	80	26	43	11	—	63	268	306	—	—	—	—	—	—	Did not qualify
1980–81	1980–81	Wales	Norris	5th	80	19	43	18	—	56	252	339	—	—	—	—	—	—	Did not qualify
1981–82	1981–82	Campbell^{[h]}	Norris	6th	80	21	47	12	—	54	270	351	—	—	—	—	—	—	Did not qualify
1982–83	1982–83	Campbell	Norris	5th	80	21	44	15	—	57	263	344	—	—	—	—	—	—	Did not qualify
1983–84	1983–84	Campbell	Norris	3rd	80	31	42	7	—	69	298	323	4	1	3	0	12	13	Lost division semifinals to St. Louis Blues, 1–3
1984–85	1984–85	Campbell	Norris	3rd	80	27	41	12	—	66	313	357	3	0	3	0	8	23	Lost division semifinals to Chicago Black Hawks, 0–3
1985–86	1985–86	Campbell	Norris	5th	80	17	57	6	—	40	266	415	—	—	—	—	—	—	Did not qualify
1986–87	1986–87	Campbell	Norris	2nd	80	34	36	10	—	78	260	274	16	9	7	0	45	40	Won division semifinals vs. Chicago Blackhawks, 4–0; Won division finals vs. Toronto Maple Leafs, 4–3; Lost conference finals to Edmonton Oilers, 1–4
1987–88	1987–88	Campbell	Norris↑	1st	80	41	28	11	—	93	322	269	16	9	7	0	69	57	Won division semifinals vs. Toronto Maple Leafs, 4–2; Won division finals vs. St. Louis Blues, 4–1; Lost conference finals to Edmonton Oilers, 1–4
1988–89	1988–89	Campbell	Norris↑	1st	80	34	34	12	—	80	313	316	6	2	4	0	18	25	Lost division semifinals to Chicago Blackhawks, 2–4
1989–90	1989–90	Campbell	Norris	5th	80	28	38	14	—	70	288	323	—	—	—	—	—	—	Did not qualify
1990–91	1990–91	Campbell	Norris	3rd	80	34	38	8	—	76	273	298	7	3	4	0	20	24	Lost division semifinals to St. Louis Blues, 3–4
1991–92	1991–92	Campbell	Norris↑	1st	80	43	25	12	—	98	320	256	11	4	7	0	29	30	Won division semifinals vs. Minnesota North Stars, 4–3; Lost division finals to Chicago Blackhawks, 0–4
1992–93	1992–93	Campbell	Norris	2nd	84	47	28	9	—	103	369	280	7	3	4	0	30	24	Lost division semifinals to Toronto Maple Leafs, 3–4
1993–94	1993–94	Western^{[i]}	Central↑	1st	84	46	30	8	—	100	356	275	7	3	4	0	27	21	Lost conference quarterfinals to San Jose Sharks, 3–4
1994–95^{[j]}	1994–95	Western‡	Central↑	1st	48	33	11	4	—	70#	180	117	18	12	6	0	61	44	Won conference quarterfinals vs. Dallas Stars, 4–1; Won conference semifinals vs. San Jose Sharks, 4–0; Won conference finals vs. Chicago Blackhawks, 4–1; Lost Stanley Cup Final to New Jersey Devils, 0–4
1995–96	1995–96	Western	Central↑	1st	82	62	13	7	—	131#	325	181	19	10	9	0	58	46	Won conference quarterfinals vs. Winnipeg Jets, 4–2; Won conference semifinals vs. St. Louis Blues, 4–3; Lost conference finals to Colorado Avalanche, 2–4
1996–97	1996–97	Western‡	Central	2nd	82	38	26	18	—	94	253	197	20	16	4	0	58	38	Won conference quarterfinals vs. St. Louis Blues, 4–2; Won conference semifinals vs. Mighty Ducks of Anaheim, 4–0; Won conference finals vs. Colorado Avalanche, 4–2; Won Stanley Cup Final vs. Philadelphia Flyers, 4–0†
1997–98	1997–98	Western‡	Central	2nd	82	44	23	15	—	103	250	196	22	16	6	0	75	49	Won conference quarterfinals vs. Phoenix Coyotes, 4–2; Won conference semifinals vs. St. Louis Blues, 4–2; Won conference finals vs. Dallas Stars, 4–2; Won Stanley Cup Final vs. Washington Capitals, 4–0†
1998–99	1998–99	Western	Central↑	1st	82	43	32	7	—	93	245	202	10	6	4	0	31	27	Won conference quarterfinals vs. Mighty Ducks of Anaheim, 4–0; Lost conference semifinals to Colorado Avalanche, 2–4
1999–2000	1999–2000	Western	Central	2nd	82	48	22	10	2^{[k]}	108	278	210	9	5	4	0	23	19	Won conference quarterfinals vs. Los Angeles Kings, 4–0; Lost conference semifinals to Colorado Avalanche, 1–4
2000–01	2000–01	Western	Central↑	1st	82	49	20	9	4	111	253	202	6	2	4	0	17	15	Lost conference quarterfinals to Los Angeles Kings, 2–4
2001–02	2001–02	Western‡	Central↑	1st	82	51	17	10	4	116#	251	187	23	16	7	0	72	47	Won conference quarterfinals vs. Vancouver Canucks, 4–2; Won conference semifinals vs. St. Louis Blues, 4–1; Won conference finals vs. Colorado Avalanche, 4–3; Won Stanley Cup Final vs. Carolina Hurricanes, 4–1†
2002–03	2002–03	Western	Central↑	1st	82	48	20	10	4	110	269	203	4	0	4	0	6	10	Lost conference quarterfinals to Mighty Ducks of Anaheim, 0–4
2003–04	2003–04	Western	Central↑	1st	82	48	21	11	2	109#	255	189	12	6	6	0	24	20	Won conference quarterfinals vs. Nashville Predators, 4–2; Lost conference semifinals to Calgary Flames, 2–4
2004–05^{[l]}	2004–05	Western	Central	—	—	—	—	—	—	—	—	—	—	—	—	—	—	—	No playoffs due to lockout
2005–06	2005–06	Western	Central↑	1st	82	58	16	—^{[m]}	8	124#	301	206	6	2	4	0	17	19	Lost conference quarterfinals to Edmonton Oilers, 2–4
2006–07	2006–07	Western	Central↑	1st	82	50	19	—	13	113	252	191	18	10	8	0	48	35	Won conference quarterfinals vs. Calgary Flames, 4–2; Won conference semifinals vs. San Jose Sharks, 4–2; Lost conference finals to Anaheim Ducks, 2–4
2007–08	2007–08	Western‡	Central↑	1st	82	54	21	—	7	115#	252	179	22	16	6	0	72	41	Won conference quarterfinals vs. Nashville Predators, 4–2; Won conference semifinals vs. Colorado Avalanche, 4–0; Won conference finals vs. Dallas Stars, 4–2; Won Stanley Cup Final vs. Pittsburgh Penguins, 4–2†
2008–09	2008–09	Western‡	Central↑	1st	82	51	21	—	10	112	289	240	23	15	8	0	76	48	Won conference quarterfinals vs. Columbus Blue Jackets, 4–0; Won conference semifinals vs. Anaheim Ducks, 4–3; Won conference finals vs. Chicago Blackhawks, 4–1; Lost Stanley Cup Final to Pittsburgh Penguins, 3–4
2009–10	2009–10	Western	Central	2nd	82	44	24	—	14	102	223	207	12	5	7	0	43	33	Won conference quarterfinals vs. Phoenix Coyotes, 4–3; Lost conference semifinals to San Jose Sharks, 1–4
2010–11	2010–11	Western	Central↑	1st	82	47	25	—	10	104	257	237	11	7	4	0	36	28	Won conference quarterfinals vs. Phoenix Coyotes, 4–0; Lost conference semifinals to San Jose Sharks, 3–4
2011–12	2011–12	Western	Central	3rd	82	48	28	—	6	102	239	200	5	1	4	0	9	13	Lost conference quarterfinals to Nashville Predators, 1–4
2012–13^{[n]}	2012–13	Western	Central	3rd	48	24	16	—	8	56	122	110	14	7	7	0	33	37	Won conference quarterfinals vs. Anaheim Ducks, 4–3; Lost conference semifinals to Chicago Blackhawks, 3–4
2013–14	2013–14	Eastern^{[o]}	Atlantic	4th	82	39	28	—	15	93	217	221	5	1	4	0	6	12	Lost first round to Boston Bruins, 1–4
2014–15	2014–15	Eastern	Atlantic	3rd	82	43	25	—	14	100	231	211	7	3	4	0	15	17	Lost first round to Tampa Bay Lightning, 3–4
2015–16	2015–16	Eastern	Atlantic	3rd	82	41	30	—	11	93	209	219	5	1	4	0	8	12	Lost first round to Tampa Bay Lightning, 1–4
2016–17	2016–17	Eastern	Atlantic	7th	82	33	36	—	13	79	198	244	—	—	—	—	—	—	Did not qualify
2017–18	2017–18	Eastern	Atlantic	5th	82	30	39	—	13	73	212	254	—	—	—	—	—	—	Did not qualify
2018–19	2018–19	Eastern	Atlantic	7th	82	32	40	—	10	74	224	272	—	—	—	—	—	—	Did not qualify
2019–20 ^{[p]}	2019–20	Eastern	Atlantic	8th	71	17	49	—	5	39	142	265	—	—	—	—	—	—	Did not qualify
2020–21 ^{[q]}	2020–21	—	Central	7th	56	19	27	—	10	48	125	168	—	—	—	—	—	—	Did not qualify
2021–22	2021–22	Eastern	Atlantic	5th	82	32	40	—	10	74	227	310	—	—	—	—	—	—	Did not qualify
2022–23	2022–23	Eastern	Atlantic	7th	82	35	37	—	10	80	237	275	—	—	—	—	—	—	Did not qualify
2023–24	2023–24	Eastern	Atlantic	5th	82	41	32	—	9	91	275	273	—	—	—	—	—	—	Did not qualify
2024–25	2024–25	Eastern	Atlantic	6th	82	39	35	—	8	86	235	259	—	—	—	—	—	—	Did not qualify
2025–26	2025–26	Eastern	Atlantic	6th	82	41	31	—	10	92	239	254	—	—	—	—	—	—	Did not qualify
Totals^{r}					6,971	3,177	2,749	815	230	7,399	21,327	20,856	622	325	296	1	1,748	1,575	

== Notes ==
- ^{a} From the 1926–27 season through the 1929–30 season, the Detroit NHL franchise was known as the Cougars.
- ^{b} From the 1926–27 season through the 1937–38 season, the Detroit NHL franchise played in the American Division.
- ^{c} From the 1930–31 season through the 1931–32 season, the Detroit NHL franchise was known as the Falcons.
- ^{d} Since the 1932–33 season, the Detroit NHL franchise has been known as the Red Wings.
- ^{e} From the 1938–39 season through the 1966–67 season, the NHL had no divisions.
- ^{f} Prior to the 1967–68 season, the NHL split into East and West Divisions because of the addition of six expansion teams.
- ^{g} The NHL realigned prior to the 1974–75 season. The Red Wings were placed in the Prince of Wales Conference's Norris Division.
- ^{h} Prior to the 1981–82 season, the NHL moved the Norris Division to the Clarence Campbell Conference.
- ^{i} The NHL realigned into Eastern and Western conferences prior to the 1993–94 season. Detroit was placed in the Central Division of the Western Conference.
- ^{j} The season was shortened to 48 games because of the 1994–95 NHL lockout.
- ^{k} Beginning with the 1999–2000 season, teams received one point for losing a regular-season game in overtime.
- ^{l} The season was cancelled because of the 2004–05 NHL lockout.
- ^{m} Prior to the 2005–06 season, the NHL instituted a penalty shootout for regular-season games that remained tied after a five-minute overtime period, which prevented ties.
- ^{n} The season was shortened to 48 games because of the 2012–13 NHL lockout.
- ^{o} The NHL realigned prior to the 2013–14 season. The Red Wings were placed in the Atlantic Division of the Eastern Conference.
- ^{p} The 2019–20 NHL season was suspended on March 12, 2020, due to the COVID-19 pandemic.
- ^{q} The 2020–21 NHL season was shortened due to the COVID-19 pandemic.
- ^{r} Totals as of completion of 2025–26 season.
