= 1948–49 New York Rangers season =

NHL hockey team season

1948–49 New York Rangers
- League: 6th NHL
- 1948–49 record: 18–31–11
- Home record: 13–12–5
- Road record: 5–19–6
- Goals for: 133
- Goals against: 172

Team information
- General manager: Frank Boucher
- Coach: Frank Boucher; Lynn Patrick
- Captain: Neil Colville
- Arena: Madison Square Garden

Team leaders
- Goals: Edgar Laprade (18)
- Assists: Buddy O'Connor (24)
- Points: Buddy O'Connor (35)
- Penalty minutes: Tony Leswick (70)
- Wins: Chuck Rayner (16)
- Goals against average: Emile Francis (2.00)

The 1948–49 New York Rangers season was the franchise's 23rd season. During the regular season, the Rangers compiled an 18–31–11 record, and finished with 47 points. The Rangers' last-place finish caused them to miss the NHL playoffs for the first time since the 1946–47 season.

== Regular season ==
=== Final standings ===
National Hockey League
| | | GP | W | L | T | GF | GA | DIFF | Pts |
|---|---|---|---|---|---|---|---|---|---|
| 1 | Detroit Red Wings | 60 | 34 | 19 | 7 | 195 | 145 | +50 | 75 |
| 2 | Boston Bruins | 60 | 29 | 23 | 8 | 178 | 163 | +15 | 66 |
| 3 | Montreal Canadiens | 60 | 28 | 23 | 9 | 152 | 126 | +26 | 65 |
| 4 | Toronto Maple Leafs | 60 | 22 | 25 | 13 | 147 | 161 | −14 | 57 |
| 5 | Chicago Black Hawks | 60 | 21 | 31 | 8 | 173 | 211 | −38 | 50 |
| 6 | New York Rangers | 60 | 18 | 31 | 11 | 133 | 172 | −39 | 47 |

=== Record vs. opponents ===
1948–49 NHL Records
| Team | BOS | CHI | DET | MTL | NYR | TOR |
|---|---|---|---|---|---|---|
| Boston | — | 6–5–1 | 5–4–3 | 5–6–1 | 8–2–2 | 5–6–1 |
| Chicago | 5–6–1 | — | 3–9 | 3–7–2 | 6–5–1 | 4–4–4 |
| Detroit | 4–5–3 | 9–3 | — | 7–4–1 | 7–4–1 | 7–3–2 |
| Montreal | 6–5–1 | 7–3–2 | 4–7–1 | — | 5–4–3 | 6–4–2 |
| New York | 2–8–2 | 5–6–1 | 4–7–1 | 4–5–3 | — | 3–5–4 |
| Toronto | 6–5–1 | 4–4–4 | 3–7–2 | 4–6–2 | 5–3–4 | — |

== Schedule and results ==
1948–49 regular season
October: 1–3–1 (home: 1–1–0; road: 0–2–1)

| Game | October | Opponent | Score | Record |
|---|---|---|---|---|
| 1 | 14 | @ Montreal Canadiens | 1–1 | 0–0–1 |
| 2 | 17 | @ Detroit Red Wings | 7–0 | 0–1–1 |
| 3 | 24 | @ Boston Bruins | 4–1 | 0–2–1 |
| 4 | 27 | Detroit Red Wings | 3–2 | 0–3–1 |
| 5 | 31 | Boston Bruins | 2–0 | 1–3–1 |

November: 2–5–3 (home: 1–2–1; road: 1–3–2)

| Game | November | Opponent | Score | Record |
|---|---|---|---|---|
| 6 | 6 | @ Toronto Maple Leafs | 3–3 | 1–3–2 |
| 7 | 7 | @ Chicago Black Hawks | 4–2 | 1–4–2 |
| 8 | 10 | Chicago Black Hawks | 4–3 | 2–4–2 |
| 9 | 13 | Montreal Canadiens | 3–1 | 2–5–2 |
| 10 | 14 | Toronto Maple Leafs | 4–4 | 2–5–3 |
| 11 | 17 | @ Detroit Red Wings | 4–4 | 2–5–4 |
| 12 | 21 | @ Boston Bruins | 4–1 | 3–5–4 |
| 13 | 25 | @ Chicago Black Hawks | 6–4 | 3–6–4 |
| 14 | 27 | @ Toronto Maple Leafs | 3–0 | 3–7–4 |
| 15 | 30 | Chicago Black Hawks | 4–2 | 3–8–4 |

December: 5–4–3 (home: 3–2–2; road: 2–2–1)

| Game | December | Opponent | Score | Record |
|---|---|---|---|---|
| 16 | 4 | @ Montreal Canadiens | 3–1 | 3–9–4 |
| 17 | 5 | Detroit Red Wings | 3–1 | 3–10–4 |
| 18 | 7 | Boston Bruins | 2–2 | 3–10–5 |
| 19 | 11 | @ Detroit Red Wings | 5–3 | 3–11–5 |
| 20 | 12 | Detroit Red Wings | 2–0 | 4–11–5 |
| 21 | 15 | Toronto Maple Leafs | 3–1 | 5–11–5 |
| 22 | 18 | @ Toronto Maple Leafs | 3–3 | 5–11–6 |
| 23 | 19 | Montreal Canadiens | 3–2 | 6–11–6 |
| 24 | 23 | @ Chicago Black Hawks | 3–2 | 7–11–6 |
| 25 | 25 | @ Montreal Canadiens | 2–0 | 8–11–6 |
| 26 | 26 | Chicago Black Hawks | 2–1 | 8–12–6 |
| 27 | 31 | Boston Bruins | 2–2 | 8–12–7 |

January: 5–5–2 (home: 4–2–1; road: 1–3–1)

| Game | January | Opponent | Score | Record |
|---|---|---|---|---|
| 28 | 1 | @ Boston Bruins | 4–1 | 8–13–7 |
| 29 | 2 | Toronto Maple Leafs | 4–2 | 9–13–7 |
| 30 | 5 | Chicago Black Hawks | 3–1 | 10–13–7 |
| 31 | 9 | Montreal Canadiens | 1–1 | 10–13–8 |
| 32 | 12 | Detroit Red Wings | 4–1 | 10–14–8 |
| 33 | 15 | @ Toronto Maple Leafs | 2–1 | 10–15–8 |
| 34 | 16 | Toronto Maple Leafs | 4–0 | 11–15–8 |
| 35 | 19 | Boston Bruins | 5–2 | 11–16–8 |
| 36 | 20 | @ Montreal Canadiens | 2–1 | 11–17–8 |
| 37 | 23 | @ Chicago Black Hawks | 2–2 | 11–17–9 |
| 38 | 26 | @ Detroit Red Wings | 5–1 | 12–17–9 |
| 39 | 30 | Montreal Canadiens | 9–0 | 13–17–9 |

February: 4–7–1 (home: 3–3–0; road: 1–4–1)

| Game | February | Opponent | Score | Record |
|---|---|---|---|---|
| 40 | 2 | @ Boston Bruins | 5–3 | 13–18–9 |
| 41 | 5 | @ Toronto Maple Leafs | 1–1 | 13–18–10 |
| 42 | 6 | @ Chicago Black Hawks | 2–0 | 14–18–10 |
| 43 | 9 | @ Detroit Red Wings | 8–0 | 14–19–10 |
| 44 | 10 | Chicago Black Hawks | 3–1 | 14–20–10 |
| 45 | 12 | @ Boston Bruins | 4–2 | 14–21–10 |
| 46 | 13 | Toronto Maple Leafs | 3–0 | 14–22–10 |
| 47 | 16 | Detroit Red Wings | 4–0 | 15–22–10 |
| 48 | 19 | @ Montreal Canadiens | 3–1 | 15–23–10 |
| 49 | 20 | Montreal Canadiens | 3–2 | 16–23–10 |
| 50 | 23 | Boston Bruins | 3–2 | 16–24–10 |
| 51 | 27 | Detroit Red Wings | 3–2 | 17–24–10 |

March: 1–7–1 (home: 1–2–1; road: 0–5–0)

| Game | March | Opponent | Score | Record |
|---|---|---|---|---|
| 52 | 2 | @ Chicago Black Hawks | 5–2 | 17–25–10 |
| 53 | 5 | @ Toronto Maple Leafs | 7–1 | 17–26–10 |
| 54 | 6 | Toronto Maple Leafs | 4–3 | 17–27–10 |
| 55 | 9 | @ Boston Bruins | 8–1 | 17–28–10 |
| 56 | 12 | @ Montreal Canadiens | 3–0 | 17–29–10 |
| 57 | 13 | Montreal Canadiens | 1–1 | 17–29–11 |
| 58 | 15 | Boston Bruins | 4–2 | 17–30–11 |
| 59 | 16 | @ Detroit Red Wings | 6–2 | 17–31–11 |
| 60 | 20 | Chicago Black Hawks | 5–1 | 18–31–11 |

Legend: Win (2 points) Loss (0 points) Tie (1 point)

== Player statistics ==
Skaters

Regular season
| Player | GP | G | A | Pts | PIM |
|---|---|---|---|---|---|
| Herbert O'Connor | 46 | 11 | 24 | 35 | 0 |
| Alex Kaleta | 56 | 12 | 19 | 31 | 18 |
| Edgar Laprade | 56 | 18 | 12 | 30 | 12 |
| Pentti Lund | 59 | 14 | 16 | 30 | 16 |
| Tony Leswick | 60 | 13 | 14 | 27 | 70 |
| Don Raleigh | 41 | 10 | 16 | 26 | 8 |
| Dunc Fisher | 60 | 9 | 16 | 25 | 40 |
| Nick Mickoski | 54 | 13 | 9 | 22 | 20 |
| Clint Albright | 59 | 14 | 5 | 19 | 19 |
| Jack Gordon | 31 | 3 | 9 | 12 | 0 |
| Allan Stanley | 40 | 2 | 8 | 10 | 22 |
| Ed Kullman | 18 | 4 | 5 | 9 | 14 |
| Fred Shero | 59 | 3 | 6 | 9 | 64 |
| Wally Stanowski | 60 | 1 | 8 | 9 | 16 |
| Bill Moe | 60 | 0 | 9 | 9 | 60 |
| Frank Eddolls | 34 | 4 | 2 | 6 | 10 |
| Neil Colville | 14 | 0 | 5 | 5 | 2 |
| Wes Trainor | 17 | 1 | 2 | 3 | 6 |
| Ed Slowinski | 20 | 1 | 1 | 2 | 2 |
| Alan Staley | 1 | 0 | 1 | 1 | 0 |
| Ray Manson | 1 | 0 | 1 | 1 | 0 |
| Elwin Morris | 18 | 0 | 1 | 1 | 8 |
| Val Delory | 1 | 0 | 0 | 0 | 0 |
| Dick Kotanen | 1 | 0 | 0 | 0 | 0 |
| Norman Lowe | 1 | 0 | 0 | 0 | 0 |
| Ralph Buchanan | 2 | 0 | 0 | 0 | 0 |
| Jack Evans | 3 | 0 | 0 | 0 | 4 |

Goaltenders

Regular season
| Player | GP | TOI | W | L | T | GA | GAA | SO |
|---|---|---|---|---|---|---|---|---|
| Chuck Rayner | 58 | 3480 | 16 | 31 | 11 | 168 | 2.90 | 7 |
| Emile Francis | 2 | 120 | 2 | 0 | 0 | 4 | 2.00 | 0 |

^{†}Denotes player spent time with another team before joining Rangers. Stats reflect time with Rangers only.
^{‡}Traded mid-season. Stats reflect time with Rangers only.

Note:

Pos = Position;GP = Games played; G = Goals; A = Assists; Pts = Points; PIM = Penalty minutes; +/- = Plus/minus; PPG = Power-play goals; SHG = Short-handed goals; GWG = Game-winning goals
Pos = Position;GP = Games played; Min, TOI = Minutes played; W = Wins; L = Losses; T,T/OT = Ties; OTL = Overtime losses; GA = Goals-against; GAA = Goals-against average; SO = Shutouts; SA = Shots against; SV = Shots saved;SV% = Save percentage;

== See also ==
- 1948–49 NHL season
