= Tod Campeau =

Canadian ice hockey player

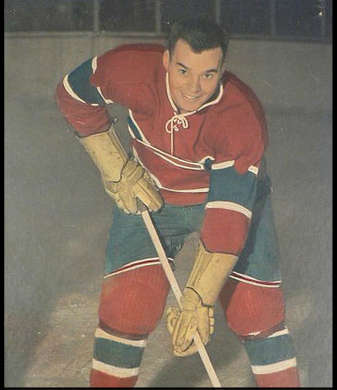
- Born: June 4, 1923; Saint-Jérôme, Quebec, Canada
- Died: December 31, 2009 (aged 86); Salaberry-de-Valleyfield, Quebec, Canada
- Height: 5 ft 11 in (180 cm)
- Weight: 175 lb (79 kg; 12 st 7 lb)
- Position: Centre
- Shot: Left
- Played for: Montreal Canadiens
- Playing career: 1943–1957

Joseph Pierre Jean-Claude "Tod" Campeau (June 4, 1923 — December 31, 2009) was a Canadian ice hockey forward who played 42 games in the National Hockey League for the Montreal Canadiens between 1943 and 1949. The rest of his career, which lasted from 1943 to 1957, was spent in the minor leagues. He was born in Saint-Jérôme, Quebec and died in Salaberry-de-Valleyfield, Quebec.

== Career statistics ==
=== Regular season and playoffs ===
			Regular season					Playoffs
Season	Team	League	GP	G	A	Pts	PIM	GP	G	A	Pts	PIM
1942–43	Montreal Junior Canadiens	QJAHA	14	11	21	32	0	7	6	5	11	17
1942–43	Montreal Senior Canadiens	QSHL	1	0	0	0	0	—	—	—	—	—
1942–43	Montreal Junior Canadiens	M-Cup	—	—	—	—	—	7	6	14	20	2
1943–44	Montreal Canadiens	NHL	2	0	0	0	0	—	—	—	—	—
1943–44	Montreal Vickers	MCHL	12	13	13	26	7	—	—	—	—	—
1943–44	Montreal Royals	QSHL	20	18	12	30	8	7	3	5	8	2
1944–45	Pittsburgh Hornets	AHL	6	1	2	3	2	—	—	—	—	—
1944–45	Valleyfield Braves	QPHL	22	16	23	39	10	11	8	8	16	11
1944–45	Valleyfield Braves	Al-Cup	—	—	—	—	—	3	0	1	1	2
1945–46	Valleyfield Braves	QSHL	40	28	50	78	45	—	—	—	—	—
1946–47	Montreal Royals	QSHL	39	22	31	53	44	9	3	9	12	12
1946–47	Montreal Royals	Al-Cup	—	—	—	—	—	14	14	11	25	6
1947–48	Montreal Canadiens	NHL	14	2	2	4	4	—	—	—	—	—
1947–48	Buffalo Bisons	AHL	31	10	9	19	6	8	0	1	1	6
1948–49	Montreal Canadiens	NHL	26	3	7	10	12	1	0	0	0	0
1948–49	Dallas Texans	USHL	30	16	28	44	13	—	—	—	—	—
1949–50	Cincinnati Mohawks	AHL	68	22	41	63	53	—	—	—	—	—
1950–51	Cincinnati Mohawks	AHL	68	13	41	54	36	—	—	—	—	—
1951–52	Sherbrooke Saints	QSHL	51	20	29	49	32	11	2	9	11	14
1952–53	Sherbrooke Saints	QSHL	60	19	49	68	48	7	1	4	5	6
1953–54	Sherbrooke Saints	QSHL	13	1	1	2	0	—	—	—	—	—
1953–54	Providence Reds	AHL	44	10	26	36	16	—	—	—	—	—
1954–55	Ottawa Senators	QSHL	12	3	4	7	15	—	—	—	—	—
1954–55	Moncton Hawks	ACSHL	29	12	34	46	35	13	2	10	12	14
1954–55	Moncton Flyers	Al-Cup	—	—	—	—	—	13	3	19	22	20
1955–56	Chicoutimi Sagueneens	QSHL	57	5	13	18	36	2	0	0	0	2
1956–57	Dalhousie Rangers	NNBHL	48	38	45	83	75	13	6	7	13	16
1956–57	Dalhousie Rangers	Al-Cup	—	—	—	—	—	8	8	10	18	6
QSHL totals			293	116	189	315	228	36	9	27	36	36
NHL totals			42	5	9	14	16	1	0	0	0	0
