= 1949 Stanley Cup Final =

1949 ice hockey championship series

	1	2	3	4	Total
Toronto Maple Leafs	3*	3	3	3	4
Detroit Red Wings	2*	1	1	1	0
- * – Denotes overtime period(s)
- Location(s): Detroit: Olympia Stadium (1, 2); Toronto: Maple Leaf Gardens (3, 4)
- Coaches: Toronto: Hap Day; Detroit: Tommy Ivan
- Captains: Toronto: Ted Kennedy; Detroit: Sid Abel
- Dates: April 8–16, 1949
- Series-winning goal: Cal Gardner (19:45, second)
- Hall of Famers: Maple Leafs: Max Bentley (1966); Turk Broda (1967); Ted Kennedy (1966); Harry Watson (1994); Red Wings: Sid Abel (1969); Gordie Howe (1972); Red Kelly (1969); Ted Lindsay (1966); Harry Lumley (1980); Bud Poile (1990, builder); Bill Quackenbush (1976); Jack Stewart (1964); Coaches: Hap Day (1961, player); Tommy Ivan (1974)

The 1949 Stanley Cup Final was a best-of-seven series between the Detroit Red Wings and the defending champion Toronto Maple Leafs, the second straight Finals series between Detroit and Toronto. The Maple Leafs swept the Red Wings again to win their third consecutive Stanley Cup and eighth in the history of the franchise, becoming the first team in NHL history to three-peat as Stanley Cup champions. The Maple Leafs also became the first team to win the Stanley Cup in back-to-back sweeps.

== Paths to the Finals ==
Detroit defeated the Montreal Canadiens 4–2 to advance to the Finals. Toronto defeated the Boston Bruins 4–1 to advance to the Finals.

== Game summaries ==
The Maple Leafs became the first NHL team to win the Stanley Cup in three straight seasons. The Leafs also won nine straight Finals games (beating Montreal in game six of the 1947 Finals, plus consecutive sweeps of the Wings in 1948 and this year).

April 8	Toronto Maple Leafs	3–2	OT	Detroit Red Wings	Olympia Stadium	Recap
Max Bentley (3) - 13:15		First period		4:15 - pp - George Gee (1)
Jimmy Thomson (1) - pp - 16:02		Second period		No scoring
No scoring		Third period		13:56 - Bill Quackenbush (1)
Joe Klukay (2) - 17:13		First overtime period		No scoring
Turk Broda		Goalie stats		Harry Lumley

April 10	Toronto Maple Leafs	3–1	Detroit Red Wings	Olympia Stadium	Recap
Sid Smith (3) - pp - 8:50; Sid Smith (4) - pp - 9:56		First period	No scoring
Sid Smith (5) - pp - 17:58		Second period	No scoring
No scoring		Third period	5:50 - Pete Horeck (1)
Turk Broda		Goalie stats	Harry Lumley

April 13	Detroit Red Wings	1–3	Toronto Maple Leafs	Maple Leaf Gardens	Recap
Jack Stewart (1) - 4:57		First period	No scoring
No scoring		Second period	Bill Ezinicki (1) - 11:02; Ted Kennedy (2) - 12:40; Gus Mortson (2) - 16:18
No scoring		Third period	No scoring
Harry Lumley		Goalie stats	Turk Broda

April 16	Detroit Red Wings	1–3	Toronto Maple Leafs	Maple Leaf Gardens	Recap
Ted Lindsay (2) - 2:59		First period	No scoring
No scoring		Second period	10:10 - pp - Ray Timgren (3); 19:45 - Cal Gardner (2)
No scoring		Third period	15:10 - Max Bentley (4)
Harry Lumley		Goalie stats	Turk Broda

Toronto won series 4–0

== Stanley Cup engraving ==
The 1949 Stanley Cup was presented to Maple Leafs captain Ted Kennedy by NHL President Clarence Campbell following the Maple Leafs 3–1 win over the Red Wings in game four.

The following Maple Leafs players and staff had their names engraved on the Stanley Cup

1948–49 Toronto Maple Leafs

=== Players ===
Centres

- 7 Max Bentley (A)
- 9 Ted Teeder Kennedy (Captain)
- 16 Fleming Mackell
- 17 Cal Gardner
- 21 Harry Taylor

Wingers

- 4 Harry Watson (A)
- 8 Joe Klukay
- 11 Howie Meeker
- 12 Bill Ezinicki*
- 14 Vic Lynn
- 15 Don Metz
- 22 Ray Timgren
- 23-24 Sid Smith

Defencemen

- 2 Jimmy Thomson
- 3 Gus Mortson
- 5 Garth Boesch
- 18 Bill Juzda
- 19 Bill Barilko
- 21-23 Bob Dawes

Goaltenders

- 1 Walter Turk Broda

=== Coaching and administrative staff ===
- Conn Smythe (President/Manager/Owner), George McGillach (Vice President)
- John Murdoch (Vice President), Jack Bickell (Director/Owner)
- Ed Bickle (Director/Owner), George Walker (Chief Scout)
- William MacBrien (Chairman/Owner), Tim Daly (Trainer)
- Clarence Hap Day (Coach)
- Kerry Day (Mascot)
- Archie Campbell* (Ass't Trainer), Ed Fitkin* (Publicity Director),
- Norman Delarue*, Robert Galloway*, Horance MacIntyre* (Team Doctors)

=== Stanley Cup engraving ===
- * The following members were engraved on the original Stanley Cup in 1949, but removed from the Stanley Cup when it was redone during 1957-58 season. #12 Bill Ezinicki (player-by mistake-played in the finals), Archie Campbell, Ed Fitkin, Norman Delarue, Horance MacIntyre, James Murphy (non players). There is room for 5 more names to be included on the cup.
- #20 Tod Sloan name was not included on the cup in 1949, but was included on the team picture. Sloan only played 29 games, and did not play in the playoffs. Sloan's name was engraved on the cup in 1951, 1961.
- William A.H. MacBrien's last name was spelt wrong. W.A.H. MacBRIAN with an "A" instead of an "E". Mistake was corrected on the Replica Cup created in 1992–93.

== See also ==
- 1948–49 NHL season

== References and notes ==
- Diamond, Dan (2000). Total Stanley Cup. Toronto: Total Sports Canada. ISBN 978-1-892129-07-9.
- Podnieks, Andrew; Hockey Hall of Fame (2004). Lord Stanley's Cup. Bolton, Ont.: Fenn Pub. pp 12, 50. ISBN 978-1-55168-261-7
- "All-Time NHL Results". Archived from the original on July 24, 2017.

Preceded by Toronto Maple Leafs; 1948	Toronto Maple Leafs; Stanley Cup champions 1949	Succeeded by Detroit Red Wings; 1950
