= 1948–49 Boston Bruins season =

NHL team season

1948–49 Boston Bruins
- League: 2nd NHL
- 1948–49 record: 29–23–8
- Home record: 18–10–2
- Road record: 11–13–6
- Goals for: 178
- Goals against: 163

Team information
- General manager: Art Ross
- Coach: Dit Clapper
- Captain: Milt Schmidt
- Arena: Boston Garden

Team leaders
- Goals: Johnny Peirson (22)
- Assists: Paul Ronty (29)
- Points: Paul Ronty (49)
- Penalty minutes: Pat Egan (92)
- Wins: Frank Brimsek (26)
- Goals against average: Frank Brimsek (2.72)

The 1948–49 Boston Bruins season was the Bruins' 25th season in the NHL.

== Regular season ==
=== Final standings ===
National Hockey League
		GP	W	L	T	GF	GA	DIFF	Pts
1	Detroit Red Wings	60	34	19	7	195	145	+50	75
2	Boston Bruins	60	29	23	8	178	163	+15	66
3	Montreal Canadiens	60	28	23	9	152	126	+26	65
4	Toronto Maple Leafs	60	22	25	13	147	161	−14	57
5	Chicago Black Hawks	60	21	31	8	173	211	−38	50
6	New York Rangers	60	18	31	11	133	172	−39	47

=== Record vs. opponents ===
1948–49 NHL Records
Team	BOS	CHI	DET	MTL	NYR	TOR
Boston	—	6–5–1	5–4–3	5–6–1	8–2–2	5–6–1
Chicago	5–6–1	—	3–9	3–7–2	6–5–1	4–4–4
Detroit	4–5–3	9–3	—	7–4–1	7–4–1	7–3–2
Montreal	6–5–1	7–3–2	4–7–1	—	5–4–3	6–4–2
New York	2–8–2	5–6–1	4–7–1	4–5–3	—	3–5–4
Toronto	6–5–1	4–4–4	3–7–2	4–6–2	5–3–4	—

== Schedule and results ==
1948–49 regular season
October

Game	Result	Date	Score	Opponent	Record
1	W	October 16, 1948	4–1	@ Toronto Maple Leafs (1948–49)	1–0–0
2	W	October 20, 1948	8–3	Chicago Black Hawks (1948–49)	2–0–0
3	W	October 24, 1948	4–1	New York Rangers (1948–49)	3–0–0
4	W	October 28, 1948	5–1	@ Chicago Black Hawks (1948–49)	4–0–0
5	T	October 30, 1948	3–3	@ Montreal Canadiens (1948–49)	4–0–1
6	L	October 31, 1948	0–2	@ New York Rangers (1948–49)	4–1–1

November

Game	Result	Date	Score	Opponent	Record
7	L	November 7, 1948	3–7	@ Detroit Red Wings (1948–49)	4–2–1
8	W	November 11, 1948	4–1	Detroit Red Wings (1948–49)	5–2–1
9	W	November 14, 1948	3–2	Montreal Canadiens (1948–49)	6–2–1
10	W	November 17, 1948	2–1	Toronto Maple Leafs (1948–49)	7–2–1
11	T	November 20, 1948	2–2	@ Toronto Maple Leafs (1948–49)	7–2–2
12	L	November 21, 1948	1–4	New York Rangers (1948–49)	7–3–2
13	W	November 24, 1948	5–3	@ Detroit Red Wings (1948–49)	8–3–2
14	W	November 27, 1948	2–0	@ Montreal Canadiens (1948–49)	9–3–2
15	W	November 28, 1948	6–2	Toronto Maple Leafs (1948–49)	10–3–2

December

Game	Result	Date	Score	Opponent	Record
16	W	December 1, 1948	5–1	Chicago Black Hawks (1948–49)	11–3–2
17	L	December 4, 1948	2–3	Detroit Red Wings (1948–49)	11–4–2
18	W	December 5, 1948	2–1	Montreal Canadiens (1948–49)	12–4–2
19	T	December 7, 1948	2–2	@ New York Rangers (1948–49)	12–4–3
20	L	December 8, 1948	3–4	@ Chicago Black Hawks (1948–49)	12–5–3
21	L	December 11, 1948	2–3	@ Toronto Maple Leafs (1948–49)	12–6–3
22	L	December 12, 1948	3–4	Toronto Maple Leafs (1948–49)	12–7–3
23	L	December 15, 1948	2–4	Montreal Canadiens (1948–49)	12–8–3
24	L	December 19, 1948	2–7	@ Chicago Black Hawks (1948–49)	12–9–3
25	W	December 22, 1948	5–2	Detroit Red Wings (1948–49)	13–9–3
26	L	December 23, 1948	2–4	@ Montreal Canadiens (1948–49)	13–10–3
27	W	December 25, 1948	2–1	Chicago Black Hawks (1948–49)	14–10–3
28	L	December 29, 1948	2–10	@ Detroit Red Wings (1948–49)	14–11–3
29	T	December 31, 1948	2–2	@ New York Rangers (1948–49)	14–11–4

January

Game	Result	Date	Score	Opponent	Record
30	W	January 1, 1949	4–1	New York Rangers (1948–49)	15–11–4
31	L	January 5, 1949	0–4	@ Toronto Maple Leafs (1948–49)	15–12–4
32	W	January 6, 1949	3–2	@ Detroit Red Wings (1948–49)	16–12–4
33	L	January 9, 1949	2–4	@ Chicago Black Hawks (1948–49)	16–13–4
34	L	January 12, 1949	3–5	Montreal Canadiens (1948–49)	16–14–4
35	W	January 16, 1949	3–1	Chicago Black Hawks (1948–49)	17–14–4
36	W	January 19, 1949	5–2	@ New York Rangers (1948–49)	18–14–4
37	L	January 22, 1949	2–4	@ Montreal Canadiens (1948–49)	18–15–4
38	W	January 23, 1949	3–0	Montreal Canadiens (1948–49)	19–15–4
39	L	January 26, 1949	1–3	Toronto Maple Leafs (1948–49)	19–16–4
40	L	January 30, 1949	0–4	Detroit Red Wings (1948–49)	19–17–4

February

Game	Result	Date	Score	Opponent	Record
41	W	February 2, 1949	5–3	New York Rangers (1948–49)	20–17–4
42	W	February 5, 1949	3–2	@ Montreal Canadiens (1948–49)	21–17–4
43	L	February 6, 1949	2–4	Toronto Maple Leafs (1948–49)	21–18–4
44	W	February 9, 1949	5–3	Chicago Black Hawks (1948–49)	22–18–4
45	W	February 12, 1949	4–2	New York Rangers (1948–49)	23–18–4
46	T	February 13, 1949	4–4	Detroit Red Wings (1948–49)	23–18–5
47	L	February 16, 1949	1–5	@ Chicago Black Hawks (1948–49)	23–19–5
48	L	February 19, 1949	2–5	@ Toronto Maple Leafs (1948–49)	23–20–5
49	T	February 21, 1949	2–2	@ Detroit Red Wings (1948–49)	23–20–6
50	W	February 23, 1949	3–2	@ New York Rangers (1948–49)	24–20–6
51	T	February 27, 1949	2–2	@ Chicago Black Hawks (1948–49)	24–20–7

March

Game	Result	Date	Score	Opponent	Record
52	T	March 2, 1949	1–1	Detroit Red Wings (1948–49)	24–20–8
53	L	March 5, 1949	0–4	@ Montreal Canadiens (1948–49)	24–21–8
54	L	March 6, 1949	0–1	Montreal Canadiens (1948–49)	24–22–8
55	W	March 9, 1949	8–1	New York Rangers (1948–49)	25–22–8
56	W	March 12, 1949	2–1	@ Toronto Maple Leafs (1948–49)	26–22–8
57	W	March 13, 1949	6–2	@ Detroit Red Wings (1948–49)	27–22–8
58	W	March 15, 1949	4–2	@ New York Rangers (1948–49)	28–22–8
59	L	March 16, 1949	3–4	Chicago Black Hawks (1948–49)	28–23–8
60	W	March 20, 1949	7–2	Toronto Maple Leafs (1948–49)	29–23–8

Legend: Win (2 points) Loss (0 points) Tie (1 point)

== Player statistics ==
=== Regular season ===
Scoring

Player	Pos	GP	G	A	Pts	PIM
Paul Ronty	C	60	20	29	49	11
Johnny Peirson	RW	59	22	21	43	45
Ken Smith	LW	59	20	20	40	6
Grant Warwick	RW	58	22	15	37	14
Ed Sandford	LW	56	16	20	36	57
Pete Babando	LW	58	19	14	33	34
Milt Schmidt	C/D	44	10	22	32	25
Jimmy Peters	RW	60	16	15	31	8
Pat Egan	D	60	6	18	24	92
Woody Dumart	LW	59	11	12	23	6
Fern Flaman	D	60	4	12	16	62
Jack Crawford	D	55	2	13	15	14
Murray Henderson	D	60	2	9	11	28
Ed Harrison	C/LW	59	5	5	10	20
Dave Creighton	C	12	1	3	4	0
Ed Kryzanowski	D	36	1	3	4	10
Zellio Toppazzini	RW	5	1	1	2	0
Cliff Thompson	D	10	0	1	1	0
Frank Brimsek	G	54	0	0	0	2
Les Colvin	G	1	0	0	0	0
Jack Gelineau	G	4	0	0	0	0
Gord Henry	G	1	0	0	0	0

Goaltending

Player	MIN	GP	W	L	T	GA	GAA	SO
Frank Brimsek	3240	54	26	20	8	147	2.72	1
Jack Gelineau	240	4	2	2	0	12	3.00	0
Gord Henry	60	1	1	0	0	0	0.00	1
Les Colvin	60	1	0	1	0	4	4.00	0
Team:	3600	60	29	23	8	163	2.72	2

=== Playoffs ===
Scoring

Player	Pos	GP	G	A	Pts	PIM
Johnny Peirson	RW	5	3	1	4	4
Ed Sandford	LW	5	1	3	4	2
Woody Dumart	LW	5	3	0	3	0
Paul Ronty	C	5	1	2	3	2
Grant Warwick	RW	5	2	0	2	0
Milt Schmidt	C/D	4	0	2	2	8
Ken Smith	LW	5	0	2	2	4
Fern Flaman	D	5	0	1	1	8
Murray Henderson	D	5	0	1	1	2
Ed Kryzanowski	D	5	0	1	1	2
Jimmy Peters	RW	4	0	1	1	0
Pete Babando	LW	4	0	0	0	2
Frank Brimsek	G	5	0	0	0	0
Jack Crawford	D	3	0	0	0	0
Dave Creighton	C	3	0	0	0	0
Pat Egan	D	5	0	0	0	16
Ed Harrison	C/LW	4	0	0	0	0
Zellio Toppazzini	RW	2	0	0	0	0

Goaltending

Player	MIN	GP	W	L	GA	GAA	SO
Frank Brimsek	316	5	1	4	16	3.04	0
Team:	316	5	1	4	16	3.04	0

Note:

Pos = Position;GP = Games played; G = Goals; A = Assists; Pts = Points; PIM = Penalty minutes; +/- = Plus/minus; PPG = Power-play goals; SHG = Short-handed goals; GWG = Game-winning goals
Pos = Position;GP = Games played; Min, TOI = Minutes played; W = Wins; L = Losses; T,T/OT = Ties; OTL = Overtime losses; GA = Goals-against; GAA = Goals-against average; SO = Shutouts; SA = Shots against; SV = Shots saved;SV% = Save percentage;

== See also ==
- 1948–49 NHL season
