= Jacques Locas =

Jacques Locas may refer to:

- Jacques Locas (ice hockey, born 1926) (1926–1985), NHL ice hockey forward from Montreal, Quebec; played for Montreal Canadiens
- Jacques Locas (ice hockey, born 1954) (1954–2006), WHA ice hockey forward from St. Jerome, Quebec; played for various teams
