= Gerry Plamondon =

Canadian ice hockey player (1924–2019)

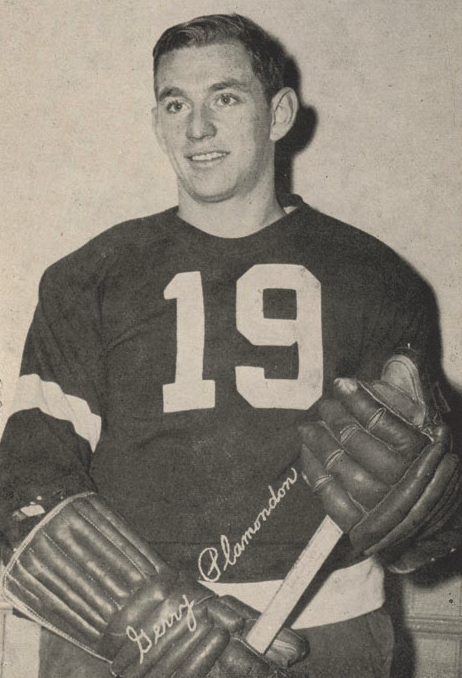
- Born: January 5, 1924 Sherbrooke, Quebec, Canada
- Died: January 26, 2019 (aged 95) Sherbrooke, Quebec, Canada
- Height: 5 ft 8 in (173 cm)
- Weight: 170 lb (77 kg; 12 st 2 lb)
- Position: Left wing
- Shot: Left
- Played for: Montreal Canadiens
- Playing career: 1944–1958

Joseph Gerard Roger Plamondon (January 5, 1924 – January 26, 2019) was a Canadian professional ice hockey player who played 74 games in the National Hockey League with the Montreal Canadiens between 1946 and 1951. The rest of his career, which lasted from 1944 to 1958, was spent in the minor leagues. Born in Sherbrooke, Quebec, he won the Stanley Cup in 1946. Plamondon was the last surviving member of Canadiens 1946 Stanley Cup team.

== Pre-NHL ==
Before playing in Montreal, Plamondon played in Senior Amateur and Minor Professional teams: Valleyfield Braves (Quebec Provincial Hockey League and Quebec Senior Hockey League) and Pittsburgh Hornets (American Hockey League)

== Reaching to NHL ==
During his time with the Canadiens, Plamondon also played with the Montreal Royals (QSHL) and Cincinnati Mohawks (AHL).

== Later career ==
After his last stint with the Royals, Plamondon did not return to the NHL, playing mostly in the Senior Amateur and Minor League circuit:Matane Red Rocks (LSLHL), Chicoutimi Sagueneens (Quebec Hockey League), Cornwall Chevies and Pembroke Lumber Kings (OHA Sr A).

He last played professional hockey in 1958 but from 1953 to 1967 he was also a head coach and player for many minor league teams mainly in Quebec and Ontario:

- 1953-54 - Matane Red Rock (LSLHL)
- 1954-55 - Trois-Rivieres Reds (QPJHL) - head coach only
- 1955-56 - Chicoutimi Sagueneens (QHL)
- 1956-57 - Cornwall Chevies (OHA Sr A)
- 1966-67 - Sherbrooke Braves (QJAHL) - head coach only

== Personal ==
Plamondon was fired by Sherbrooke in 1967 thus ending his hockey career. He later returned to live in Sherbrooke, where he died in 2019.

== Career statistics ==
=== Regular season and playoffs ===
			Regular season					Playoffs
Season	Team	League	GP	G	A	Pts	PIM	GP	G	A	Pts	PIM
1943–44	Montreal Canada Car	MCHL	11	6	6	12	0	—	—	—	—	—
1943–44	Montreal Junior Canadiens	QJAHA	15	21	7	28	2	3	6	1	7	0
1943–44	Montreal Junior Royals	M-Cup	—	—	—	—	—	4	1	3	4	4
1944–45	Valleyfield Braves	QPHL	23	14	20	34	8	11	13	7	20	2
1944–45	Pittsburgh Hornets	AHL	4	2	2	4	10	—	—	—	—	—
1944–45	Valleyfield Braves	Al-Cup	—	—	—	—	—	3	1	0	1	0
1945–46	Montreal Canadiens	NHL	6	0	2	2	2	1	0	0	0	0
1945–46	Valleyfield Braves	QSHL	39	40	28	68	12	—	—	—	—	—
1946–47	Montreal Royals	QSHL	26	15	15	30	21	11	5	4	9	4
1946–47	Montreal Royals	Al-Cup	—	—	—	—	—	14	7	12	19	2
1947–48	Montreal Canadiens	NHL	3	1	1	2	0	—	—	—	—	—
1947–48	Montreal Royals	QSHL	46	51	22	73	16	3	0	1	1	0
1948–49	Montreal Canadiens	NHL	27	5	5	10	8	7	5	1	6	0
1948–49	Montreal Royals	QSHL	36	34	25	59	24	—	—	—	—	—
1949–50	Montreal Canadiens	NHL	37	1	5	6	0	3	0	1	1	2
1949–50	Cincinnati Mohawks	AHL	20	8	9	17	6	—	—	—	—	—
1950–51	Montreal Canadiens	NHL	1	0	0	0	0	—	—	—	—	—
1950–51	Cincinnati Mohawks	AHL	70	21	29	50	43	—	—	—	—	—
1951–52	Montreal Royals	QMHL	60	23	29	52	21	7	3	1	4	0
1952–53	Montreal Royals	QMHL	57	18	22	40	6	16	2	4	6	2
1953–54	Matane Red Rockets	SLVHL	68	18	43	61	16	—	—	—	—	—
1953–54	Matane Red Rockets	Al-Cup	—	—	—	—	—	16	6	6	12	10
1954–55	Trois-Rivieres Reds	QSHL	—	—	—	—	—	—	—	—	—	—
1955–56	Chicoutimi Sagueneens	QSHL	7	1	1	2	12	—	—	—	—	—
1956–57	Cornwall Chevies	OHA Sr	50	7	24	31	20	6	0	0	0	10
1957–58	Pembroke Lumber Kings	OHA Sr	50	12	21	33	18	12	1	4	5	6
NHL totals			74	7	13	20	10	11	5	2	7	2
