= Al Staley =

Canadian ice hockey player (1928–2019)

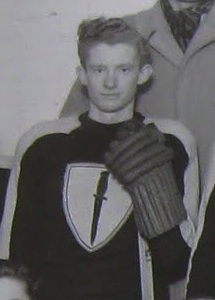
- Staley with the Regina Commandos, c. 1944
- Born: September 21, 1928; Regina, Saskatchewan, Canada
- Died: April 7, 2019 (aged 90); Saskatoon, Saskatchewan, Canada
- Height: 6 ft 1 in (185 cm)
- Weight: 175 lb (79 kg; 12 st 7 lb)
- Position: Centre
- Shot: Right
- Played for: New York Rangers
- Playing career: 1948–1953

Allan Ramon "Red" Staley (September 21, 1928 – April 7, 2019) was a Canadian professional ice hockey centre. He played one game in the National Hockey League with the New York Rangers during the 1948–49 season. The rest of his career, which lasted from 1948 to 1953, was spent in the minor leagues.

== Biography ==
Staley played one National Hockey League game for the New York Rangers during the 1948–49 NHL season, on November 14, 1948, against the Toronto Maple Leafs. The rest of his career was spent in the minor leagues and senior leagues, and he retired in 1953.

Staley died on April 7, 2019, at a hospital in Saskatoon, Saskatchewan, at the age of 90.

== Career statistics ==
=== Regular season and playoffs ===
			Regular season					Playoffs
Season	Team	League	GP	G	A	Pts	PIM	GP	G	A	Pts	PIM
1944–45	Regina Commandos	S-SJHL	17	3	3	6	4	9	4	0	4	6
1945–46	Regina Commandos	S-SJHL	17	12	12	24	10	9	2	4	6	10
1946–47	Regina Pats	SJHL	23	22	27	49	21	6	9	4	13	6
1947–48	Regina Pats	SJHL	28	37	30	67	43	5	3	7	10	14
1948–49	New York Rangers	NHL	1	0	1	1	0	—	—	—	—	—
1948–49	New Haven Ramblers	AHL	2	0	0	0	0	—	—	—	—	—
1948–49	New York 14th Precinct	QHL	51	17	21	38	15	—	—	—	—	—
1949–50	Regina Capitals	WCSHL	10	1	2	3	4	—	—	—	—	—
1949–50	Saskatoon Quakers	WCSHL	16	7	2	9	2	5	2	1	3	8
1950–51	Saskatoon Quakers	WCSHL	59	28	29	57	46	4	0	3	3	0
1951–52	Trail Smoke Eaters	WIHL	43	20	24	44	61	3	1	3	4	0
1952–53	Moose Jaw Millers	SSHL	30	23	27	50	57	10	6	4	10	4
WCSHL totals			85	36	33	69	52	9	2	4	6	8
NHL totals			1	0	1	1	0	—	—	—	—	—

== See also ==
- List of players who played only one game in the NHL
