= 1948–49 NHL transactions =

The following is a list of all team-to-team transactions that have occurred in the National Hockey League (NHL) during the 1948–49 NHL season. It lists which team each player has been traded to and for which player(s) or other consideration(s), if applicable.

== Transactions ==
| June 30, 1948 | To Boston Bruins Gerry Brown; Harold Jackson | To Montreal Canadiens Jack McGill |
| September 9, 1948 | To Detroit Red Wings Hec Highton; Joe Lund | To Chicago Black Hawks Red Almas; Lloyd Doran; Tony Licari; Thain Simon; Barry Sullivan |
| October 7, 1948 | To Chicago Black Hawks Sugar Jim Henry | To New York Rangers Emile Francis; Alex Kaleta |
| October 25, 1948 | To Detroit Red Wings George Gee; Bud Poile | To Chicago Black Hawks Jim Conacher; Bep Guidolin; Doug McCaig |
