= Bill Juzda =

Canadian ice hockey player (1920–2008)

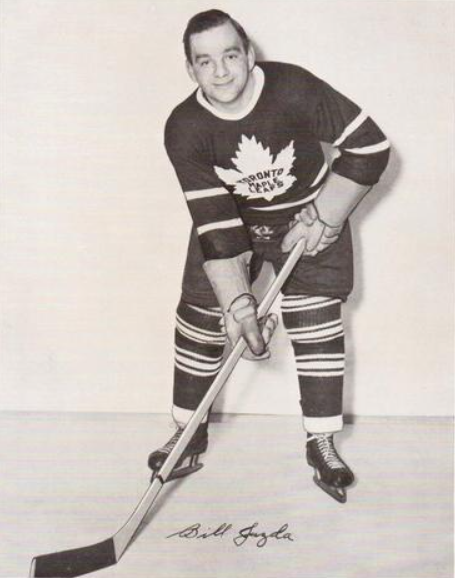
- Born: October 29, 1920 Winnipeg, Manitoba, Canada
- Died: February 17, 2008 (aged 87) Winnipeg, Manitoba, Canada
- Height: 5 ft 9 in (175 cm)
- Weight: 190 lb (86 kg; 13 st 8 lb)
- Position: Defence
- Shot: Right
- Played for: Toronto Maple Leafs; New York Rangers
- Playing career: 1940–1952

William Juzda (October 29, 1920 – February 17, 2008) was a Canadian professional ice hockey defenceman from Winnipeg, Manitoba. He played with the Toronto Maple Leafs and New York Rangers of the National Hockey League (NHL) between 1940 and 1952 and won the Stanley Cup with the Leafs twice, in 1949 and 1951. Not a prolific goal scorer, Juzda built a reputation as one of hockey's hardest hitters. One of his hits ended Toe Blake's NHL career in the 1947–48 season.

== Early years and pre-war NHL career ==
Juzda began his hockey career in the Western Junior Hockey League with the Elmwood Maple Leafs and Kenora Thistles, helping the Thistles earn a trip to the Memorial Cup final in 1940. He was called up by the New York Rangers during the 1940–41 season but spent a good part of the year with their American Hockey League (AHL) affiliate, the Philadelphia Rockets. He appeared in 45 games with the Rangers during the 1941–42 season. Juzda put his National Hockey League career on hold when he volunteered for World War II service with the Royal Canadian Air Force (RCAF). He maintained his connection with hockey by playing for the RCAF hockey team in the Winnipeg National Defense Hockey League (WNDHL).

== NHL career after World War II ==
At the conclusion of the war, Juzda was discharged from military service and he returned to hockey full-time. He joined the New Haven Ramblers of the AHL and was re-signed by the New York Rangers in time for the 1946–47 NHL season. He appeared in another 137 games with the Rangers before being traded to the Toronto Maple Leafs in a multi-player deal before the 1947–48 NHL season. With the Leafs, Juzda won two Stanley Cups in 1949 and 1951, playing alongside legendary Leaf teammates including Ted "Teeder" Kennedy, Bill Barilko and Howie Meeker. He appeared in a total of 211 games with the Leafs. He left the NHL after the 1952 season.

== Career after the NHL ==
Juzda played for the Pittsburgh Hornets of the AHL in 1952 and earned an AHL 2nd team All-Star selection. In 1953 he returned to Winnipeg to play for the Winnipeg Maroons for ten seasons, making two Allan Cup final appearances. The Maroons toured Czechoslovakia. In the mid-1950s Juzda had brief stops with the Brandon Wheat Kings and the Pine Falls Paper Kings. While Juzda officially retired from hockey after 1963, he played old-timers' hockey well into his seventies.

Juzda coached hockey from levels midget to senior. Until his death, Juzda resided in Winnipeg, and still wore his Stanley Cup ring from the 1948–49 season. He was inducted into the Manitoba Sports Hall of Fame and Museum in 1992. He died on February 17, 2008.

== Career statistics ==
=== Regular season and playoffs ===
			Regular season					Playoffs
Season	Team	League	GP	G	A	Pts	PIM	GP	G	A	Pts	PIM
1939–40	St. John's Technical High School	HS-MB	—	—	—	—	—	—	—	—	—	—
1938–39	Elmwood Maple Leafs	MJHL	16	1	9	10	36	5	1	1	2	0
1939–40	Kenora Thistles	MJHL	24	3	6	9	29	9	2	3	5	20
1939–40	Kenora Thistles	M-Cup	—	—	—	—	—	11	1	4	5	42
1940–41	New York Rangers	NHL	5	0	0	0	2	—	—	—	—	—
1940–41	Philadelphia Ramblers	AHL	52	7	14	21	47	—	—	—	—	—
1941–42	New York Rangers	NHL	45	4	8	12	29	6	0	1	1	4
1942–43	Buffalo Bisons	AHL	1	0	0	0	0	—	—	—	—	—
1942–43	Winnipeg RCAF Bombers	WNDHL	13	3	3	6	8	5	0	0	0	14
1942–43	Winnipeg RCAF Bombers	Al-Cup	—	—	—	—	—	12	1	3	4	14
1943–44	Winnipeg RCAF Bombers	WNDHL	3	0	0	0	4	—	—	—	—	—
1944–45	Dartmouth RCAF	NSDHL	4	0	0	0	12	3	0	4	4	4
1945–46	New York Rangers	NHL	32	1	3	4	17	—	—	—	—	—
1945–46	Providence Reds	AHL	18	4	3	7	20	2	0	0	0	9
1946–47	New York Rangers	NHL	45	3	5	8	60	—	—	—	—	—
1946–47	New Haven Ramblers	AHL	16	2	4	6	20	—	—	—	—	—
1947–48	New York Rangers	NHL	60	3	9	12	70	6	0	0	0	9
1948–49	Toronto Maple Leafs	NHL	38	1	2	3	23	9	0	2	2	8
1948–49	Pittsburgh Hornets	AHL	7	0	3	3	4	—	—	—	—	—
1949–50	Toronto Maple Leafs	NHL	62	1	14	15	68	7	0	0	0	10
1950–51	Toronto Maple Leafs	NHL	65	0	9	9	64	11	0	0	0	7
1951–52	Toronto Maple Leafs	NHL	46	1	4	5	65	3	0	0	0	2
1952–53	Pittsburgh Hornets	AHL	59	1	15	16	108	10	0	1	1	11
1953–54	Winnipeg Maroons	Al-Cup	—	—	—	—	—	23	4	8	12	75
1954–55	Brandon Regals	MHL	10	3	7	10	32	—	—	—	—	—
1955–56	Winnipeg Warriors	WHL	3	0	1	1	4	9	1	5	6	32
1957–58	Winnipeg Maroons	Al-Cup	—	—	—	—	—	13	0	4	4	21
1958–59	Winnipeg Maroons	Al-Cup	—	—	—	—	—	3	0	2	2	2
1959–60	Winnipeg Maroons	Al-Cup	—	—	—	—	—	3	1	0	1	2
1960–61	Winnipeg Maroons	Al-Cup	—	—	—	—	—	20	2	4	6	43
1961–62	Winnipeg Maroons	Al-Cup	—	—	—	—	—	9	0	0	0	23
1962–63	Winnipeg Maroons	SSHL	6	0	0	0	2	—	—	—	—	—
NHL totals			398	14	54	68	398	42	0	3	3	40

== Awards and achievements ==
- AHL Second All-Star Team (1953)
- Played in NHL All-Star Game (1948 and 1949)
- Stanley Cup Championships (1949 and 1951)
- Inducted into the Manitoba Sports Hall of Fame and Museum in 1992
- Honoured Member of the Manitoba Hockey Hall of Fame
