= Dick Kotanen =

Canadian ice hockey player

- Born: November 18, 1925; Port Arthur, Ontario, Canada
- Died: September 9, 2011 (aged 85); Vancouver, British Columbia, Canada
- Height: 5 ft 11 in (180 cm)
- Weight: 190 lb (86 kg; 13 st 8 lb)
- Position: Defence
- Shot: Right
- Played for: New York Rangers
- Playing career: 1945–1958

Eino Richard Erwin Kotanen (November 18, 1925 – September 9, 2011) was a Canadian professional ice hockey defenceman who played one game in the National Hockey League with the New York Rangers during the 1950–51 season, on March 25, 1951 against the Chicago Black Hawks. The rest of his career, which lasted from 1945 to 1958, was spent in the minor and senior leagues.

Kotanen died on September 9, 2011.

== Career statistics ==
=== Regular season and playoffs ===
			Regular season					Playoffs
Season	Team	League	GP	G	A	Pts	PIM	GP	G	A	Pts	PIM
1942–43	Port Arthur Bruins	TBJHL	8	3	2	5	2	3	0	1	1	2
1943–44	Port Arthur Bruins	TBJHL	11	3	4	7	6	4	0	3	3	4
1944–45	Winnipeg Maroons	MJHL	4	1	1	2	0	2	0	1	1	2
1944–45	Winnipeg Army Grenades	WSrHL	9	0	2	2	2	2	0	0	0	2
1945–46	Brandon Elks	MJHL	8	2	3	5	2	7	1	2	3	16
1946–47	Port Arthur Bearcats	TBSHL	12	1	8	9	12	5	0	0	0	8
1946–47	Port Arthur Bearcats	Al-Cup	—	—	—	—	—	8	0	1	1	0
1947–48	New York Rovers	QSHL	45	3	8	11	34	4	1	2	3	4
1947–48	New York Rovers	EAHL	17	3	6	9	10	—	—	—	—	—
1948–49	New York Rovers	QSHL	63	4	10	14	52	—	—	—	—	—
1949–50	Regina Capitals	WCSHL	49	5	5	10	102	—	—	—	—	—
1949–50	New York Rovers	EAHL	1	0	0	0	0	12	0	0	0	22
1950–51	New York Rangers	NHL	1	0	0	0	0	—	—	—	—	—
1950–51	Sherbrooke Saints	QSHL	19	0	2	2	30	—	—	—	—	—
1950–51	New York Rovers	EAHL	32	2	4	6	79	6	0	1	1	37
1951–52	Trail Smoke Eaters	WIHL	33	4	14	18	110	10	3	4	7	20
1952–53	Seattle Bombers	WHL	2	1	1	2	0	—	—	—	—	—
1953–54	Windsor Bulldogs	OHA Sr	54	10	23	33	87	4	1	3	4	20
1954–55	Windsor Bulldogs	OHA Sr	46	3	18	21	77	—	—	—	—	—
1954–55	Pembroke Lumber Kings	NOHA	2	1	0	1	2	—	—	—	—	—
1955–56	Chatham Maroons	OHA Sr	48	1	8	9	109	10	0	4	4	22
1955–56	Chatham Maroons	Al-Cup	—	—	—	—	—	17	1	8	9	16
1956–57	Chatham Maroons	OHA Sr	17	0	4	4	22	—	—	—	—	—
1956–57	Kingston CKLCs	EOHL	29	1	9	10	40	5	1	0	1	8
1957–58	North Bay Trappers	OHA Sr	42	1	13	14	32	—	—	—	—	—
OHA Sr totals			207	15	66	81	337	14	1	7	8	42
NHL totals			1	0	0	0	0	—	—	—	—	—

== See also ==
- List of players who played only one game in the NHL
