= Howard Riopelle =

Canadian ice hockey player (1922 - 2013)

- Riopelle in 1947
- Born: January 30, 1922 Ottawa, Ontario, Canada
- Died: September 22, 2013 (aged 91) Ottawa, Ontario, Canada
- Height: 5 ft 11 in (180 cm)
- Weight: 165 lb (75 kg; 11 st 11 lb)
- Position: Left wing
- Shot: Left
- Played for: Montreal Canadiens
- Playing career: 1942–1955

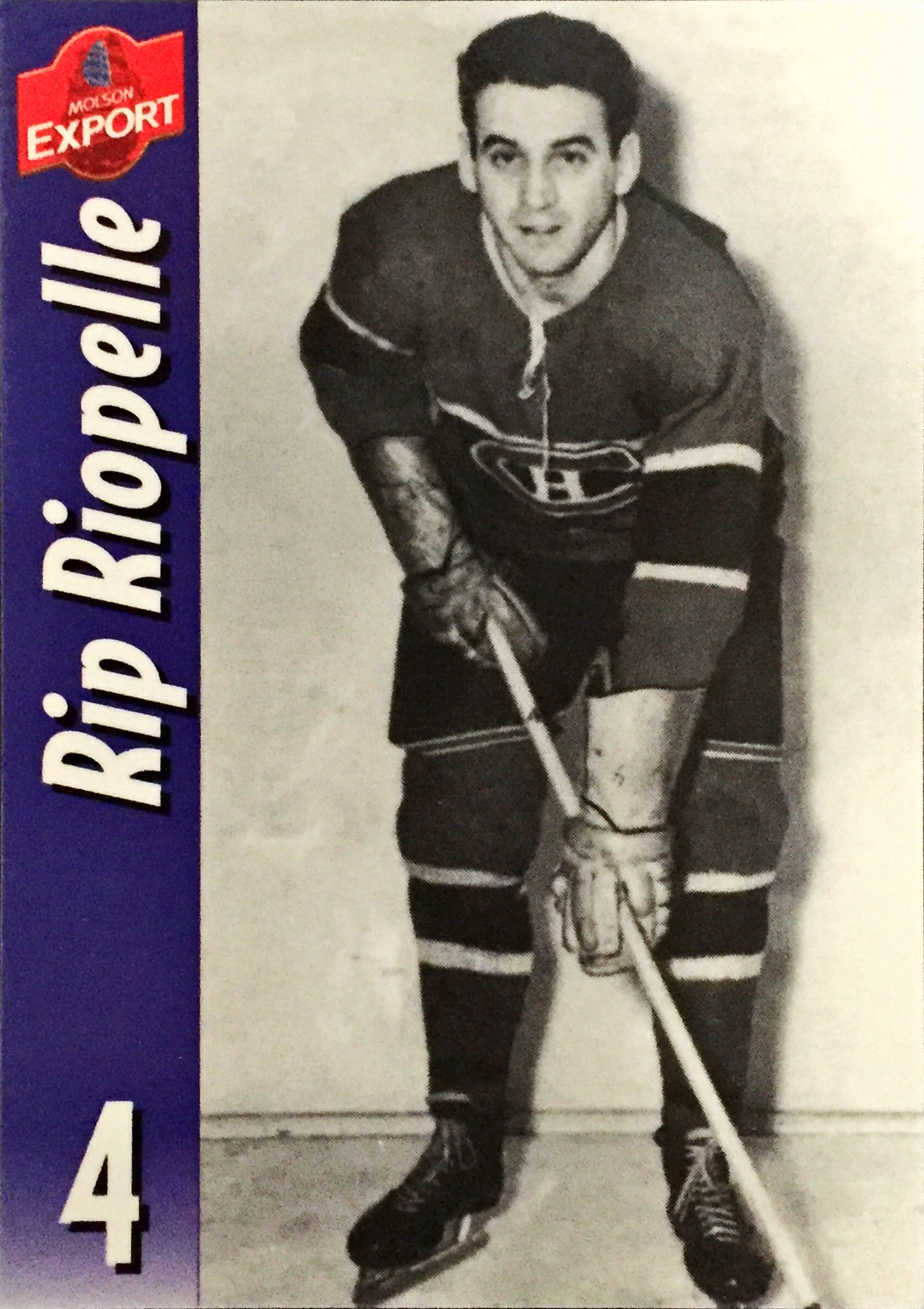
Howard Riopelle, Montreal Canadiens

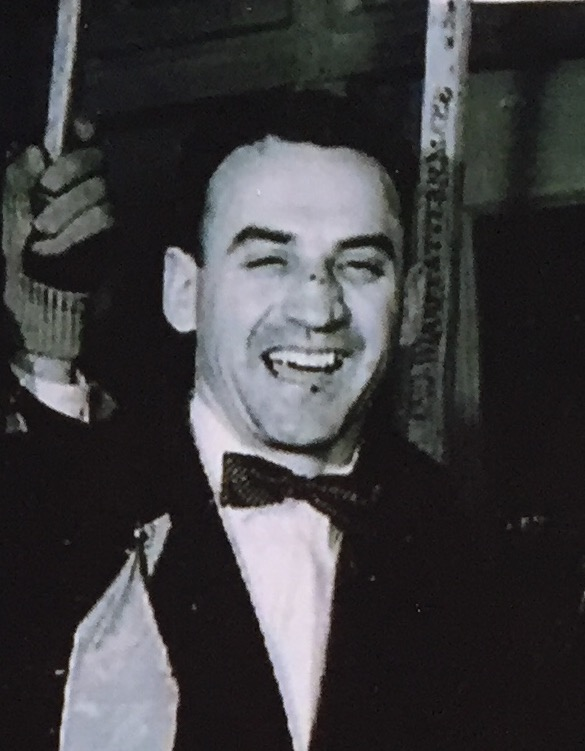
Howard Riopelle, Montreal Canadiens

Joseph Howard Riopelle (January 30, 1922 – September 22, 2013) was a Canadian ice hockey forward who played 169 games in the National Hockey League for the Montreal Canadiens from 1947 to 1950. The rest of his career, which lasted from 1942 to 1955, was spent in the minor leagues. He was born in Ottawa, Ontario.

Riopelle died at his home in Blackburn Hamlet, Ottawa, Ontario in 2013, aged 91.

== Career statistics ==
=== Regular season and playoffs ===
			Regular season					Playoffs
Season	Team	League	GP	G	A	Pts	PIM	GP	G	A	Pts	PIM
1936–37	Ottawa St. Malachy's	HS-ON	—	—	—	—	—	—	—	—	—	—
1937–38	Ottawa Lasalle	OCJHL	13	7	2	9	4	—	—	—	—	—
1937–38	Ottawa Lasalle	OCHL	1	0	0	0	0	—	—	—	—	—
1938–39	Ottawa St. Pats	OCJHL	—	—	—	—	—	—	—	—	—	—
1939–40	Ottawa St. Pats	OCJHL	—	—	—	—	—	—	—	—	—	—
1940–41	Ottawa St. Pats	OCHL	—	—	—	—	—	—	—	—	—	—
1940–41	Ottawa Car Bombers	UOVHL	1	0	1	1	2	—	—	—	—	—
1941–42	Ottawa St. Pats	OCJHL	—	—	—	—	—	5	2	5	7	2
1942–43	Toronto RCAF	OHA Sr	10	14	6	20	2	9	5	4	9	2
1943–44	Arnprior RCAF	UOVHL	5	6	6	12	2	—	—	—	—	—
1945–46	Montreal Royals	QSHL	36	20	21	41	16	11	7	6	13	4
1946–47	Montreal Royals	QSHL	34	10	19	29	26	11	3	6	9	4
1946–47	Montreal Royals	Al-Cup	—	—	—	—	—	14	0	6	6	8
1947–48	Montreal Canadiens	NHL	55	5	2	7	12	—	—	—	—	—
1948–49	Montreal Canadiens	NHL	48	10	6	16	34	7	1	1	2	2
1949–50	Montreal Canadiens	NHL	66	12	8	20	25	1	0	0	0	0
1951–52	Ottawa Senators	QSHL	54	18	28	46	18	7	1	4	5	0
1952–53	Ottawa Senators	QSHL	60	20	31	51	20	11	3	7	10	4
1953–54	Ottawa Senators	QSHL	72	31	60	91	46	22	3	9	12	4
1954–55	Ottawa Senators	QSHL	20	4	4	8	12	—	—	—	—	—
QSHL totals			276	103	163	266	138	62	17	32	49	16
NHL totals			169	27	16	43	71	8	1	1	2	2
