= Jacques Locas (ice hockey, born 1926) =

Canadian ice hockey player

- Born: February 12, 1926 Pointe-aux-Trembles, Quebec, Canada
- Died: September 26, 1985 (aged 59)
- Height: 5 ft 11 in (180 cm)
- Weight: 175 lb (79 kg; 12 st 7 lb)
- Position: Right wing
- Shot: Right
- Played for: Montreal Canadiens
- Playing career: 1946–1960

Joseph Roland Jacques Locas (February 12, 1926 – September 26, 1985) was a Canadian professional ice hockey forward who played 59 games in the National Hockey League for the Montreal Canadiens during the 1947–48 and 1948–49 seasons. The rest of his career lasted from 1946 to 1960 and was spent in the minor leagues. Locas was born in Pointe-aux-Trembles, Quebec, but grew up in Saint-Jérôme, Quebec.

== Career statistics ==
=== Regular season and playoffs ===
			Regular season					Playoffs
Season	Team	League	GP	G	A	Pts	PIM	GP	G	A	Pts	PIM
1943–44	Montreal Concordia Civics	QJHL	13	8	7	15	8	5	3	0	3	2
1944–45	Montreal Concordia Civics	QJHL	10	6	5	11	2	2	2	1	3	2
1945–46	Montreal Concordia Civics	QJHL	20	25	8	33	31	5	7	3	10	4
1946–47	Montreal Royals	QSHL	38	23	12	35	69	10	11	3	14	12
1946–47	Montreal Royals	Al-Cup	—	—	—	—	—	14	11	7	18	14
1947–48	Montreal Canadiens	NHL	56	7	8	15	65	—	—	—	—	—
1948–49	Montreal Canadiens	NHL	3	0	0	0	0	—	—	—	—	—
1948–49	Dallas Texans	USHL	6	3	2	5	0	—	—	—	—	—
1949–50	Cincinnati Mohawks	AHL	62	8	15	23	36	—	—	—	—	—
1950–51	Montreal Royals	QSHL	22	15	7	22	63	7	2	2	4	10
1951–52	Montreal Royals	QSHL	41	11	15	26	44	7	0	1	1	0
1952–53	Sherbrooke Saints	QSHL	57	36	28	64	61	7	2	3	5	24
1953–54	Chicoutimi Sagueneens	QSHL	65	35	20	55	45	7	2	0	2	6
1954–55	Chicoutimi Sagueneens	QSHL	46	24	14	38	36	—	—	—	—	—
1955–56	Chicoutimi Sagueneens	QSHL	62	27	23	50	80	5	2	0	2	2
1956–57	Chicoutimi Sagueneens	QSHL	67	33	13	46	54	10	5	2	7	24
1957–58	Chicoutimi Sagueneens	QSHL	64	40	16	56	54	5	2	0	2	6
1958–59	Chicoutimi Sagueneens	QSHL	61	49	24	73	46	—	—	—	—	—
1959–60	Quebec Aces	AHL	39	9	8	17	20	—	—	—	—	—
QSHL totals			523	293	172	465	552	58	26	11	37	84
NHL totals			59	7	8	15	66	—	—	—	—	—
