= 1948–49 Toronto Maple Leafs season =

NHL hockey team season (won Stanley Cup)

1948–49 Toronto Maple Leafs
- Stanley Cup champions
- League: 4th NHL
- 1948–49 record: 22–25–13
- Home record: 12–8–10
- Road record: 10–17–3
- Goals for: 147
- Goals against: 161

Team information
- General manager: Conn Smythe
- Coach: Hap Day
- Captain: Ted Kennedy
- Arena: Maple Leaf Gardens

Team leaders
- Goals: Harry Watson (26)
- Assists: Max Bentley and Cal Gardner (22)
- Points: Harry Watson (45)
- Penalty minutes: Bill Ezinicki (145)
- Wins: Turk Broda (22)
- Goals against average: Turk Broda (2.68)

The 1948–49 Toronto Maple Leafs season involved winning the Stanley Cup. The Maple Leafs became the first team in NHL history to win three consecutive Stanley Cups.

== Regular season ==
=== Final standings ===
National Hockey League
		GP	W	L	T	GF	GA	DIFF	Pts
1	Detroit Red Wings	60	34	19	7	195	145	+50	75
2	Boston Bruins	60	29	23	8	178	163	+15	66
3	Montreal Canadiens	60	28	23	9	152	126	+26	65
4	Toronto Maple Leafs	60	22	25	13	147	161	−14	57
5	Chicago Black Hawks	60	21	31	8	173	211	−38	50
6	New York Rangers	60	18	31	11	133	172	−39	47

=== Record vs. opponents ===
1948–49 NHL Records
Team	BOS	CHI	DET	MTL	NYR	TOR
Boston	—	6–5–1	5–4–3	5–6–1	8–2–2	5–6–1
Chicago	5–6–1	—	3–9	3–7–2	6–5–1	4–4–4
Detroit	4–5–3	9–3	—	7–4–1	7–4–1	7–3–2
Montreal	6–5–1	7–3–2	4–7–1	—	5–4–3	6–4–2
New York	2–8–2	5–6–1	4–7–1	4–5–3	—	3–5–4
Toronto	6–5–1	4–4–4	3–7–2	4–6–2	5–3–4	—

== Schedule and results ==
1948–49 regular season
October

Game	Result	Date	Score	Opponent	Record
1	L	October 16	1–4	Boston Bruins (1948–49)	0–1–0
2	L	October 21	0–5	@ Montreal Canadiens (1948–49)	0–2–0
3	W	October 23	6–1	Chicago Black Hawks (1948–49)	1–2–0
4	L	October 24	1–2	@ Detroit Red Wings (1948–49)	1–3–0
5	W	October 27	3–2	Montreal Canadiens (1948–49)	2–3–0
6	W	October 30	2–1	Detroit Red Wings (1948–49)	3–3–0
7	L	October 31	1–2	@ Chicago Black Hawks (1948–49)	3–4–0

November

Game	Result	Date	Score	Opponent	Record
8	T	November 6	3–3	New York Rangers (1948–49)	3–4–1
9	L	November 13	3–6	Chicago Black Hawks (1948–49)	3–5–1
10	T	November 14	4–4	@ New York Rangers (1948–49)	3–5–2
11	L	November 17	1–2	@ Boston Bruins (1948–49)	3–6–2
12	T	November 20	2–2	Boston Bruins (1948–49)	3–6–3
13	T	November 21	3–3	@ Chicago Black Hawks (1948–49)	3–6–4
14	T	November 24	3–3	Montreal Canadiens (1948–49)	3–6–5
15	W	November 25	2–0	@ Montreal Canadiens (1948–49)	4–6–5
16	W	November 27	3–0	New York Rangers (1948–49)	5–6–5
17	L	November 28	2–6	@ Boston Bruins (1948–49)	5–7–5

December

Game	Result	Date	Score	Opponent	Record
18	L	December 1	3–5	@ Detroit Red Wings (1948–49)	5–8–5
19	L	December 4	4–6	Chicago Black Hawks (1948–49)	5–9–5
20	W	December 5	2–0	@ Chicago Black Hawks (1948–49)	6–9–5
21	L	December 8	3–4	Detroit Red Wings (1948–49)	6–10–5
22	W	December 11	3–2	Boston Bruins (1948–49)	7–10–5
23	W	December 12	4–3	@ Boston Bruins (1948–49)	8–10–5
24	L	December 15	1–3	@ New York Rangers (1948–49)	8–11–5
25	T	December 18	3–3	New York Rangers (1948–49)	8–11–6
26	L	December 19	1–5	@ Detroit Red Wings (1948–49)	8–12–6
27	W	December 25	2–1	Detroit Red Wings (1948–49)	9–12–6
28	L	December 30	2–3	@ Montreal Canadiens (1948–49)	9–13–6

January

Game	Result	Date	Score	Opponent	Record
29	W	January 1	5–3	Montreal Canadiens (1948–49)	10–13–6
30	L	January 2	2–4	@ New York Rangers (1948–49)	10–14–6
31	W	January 5	4–0	Boston Bruins (1948–49)	11–14–6
32	T	January 8	3–3	Chicago Black Hawks (1948–49)	11–14–7
33	T	January 9	2–2	@ Detroit Red Wings (1948–49)	11–14–8
34	W	January 15	2–1	New York Rangers (1948–49)	12–14–8
35	L	January 16	0–4	@ New York Rangers (1948–49)	12–15–8
36	L	January 19	1–4	Montreal Canadiens (1948–49)	12–16–8
37	T	January 22	2–2	Detroit Red Wings (1948–49)	12–16–9
38	L	January 23	1–2	@ Detroit Red Wings (1948–49)	12–17–9
39	W	January 26	3–1	@ Boston Bruins (1948–49)	13–17–9
40	T	January 29	4–4	Chicago Black Hawks (1948–49)	13–17–10
41	L	January 30	2–4	@ Chicago Black Hawks (1948–49)	13–18–10

February

Game	Result	Date	Score	Opponent	Record
42	W	February 3	4–1	@ Montreal Canadiens (1948–49)	14–18–10
43	T	February 5	1–1	New York Rangers (1948–49)	14–18–11
44	W	February 6	4–2	@ Boston Bruins (1948–49)	15–18–11
45	T	February 9	2–2	Montreal Canadiens (1948–49)	15–18–12
46	W	February 12	3–1	Detroit Red Wings (1948–49)	16–18–12
47	W	February 13	3–0	@ New York Rangers (1948–49)	17–18–12
48	L	February 17	0–3	@ Montreal Canadiens (1948–49)	17–19–12
49	W	February 19	5–2	Boston Bruins (1948–49)	18–19–12
50	W	February 20	4–3	@ Chicago Black Hawks (1948–49)	19–19–12
51	T	February 26	2–2	Chicago Black Hawks (1948–49)	19–19–13

March

Game	Result	Date	Score	Opponent	Record
52	L	March 2	0–2	Montreal Canadiens (1948–49)	19–20–13
53	W	March 5	7–1	New York Rangers (1948–49)	20–20–13
54	W	March 6	4–3	@ New York Rangers (1948–49)	21–20–13
55	L	March 9	0–5	@ Detroit Red Wings (1948–49)	21–21–13
56	L	March 12	1–2	Boston Bruins (1948–49)	21–22–13
57	W	March 13	3–1	@ Chicago Black Hawks (1948–49)	22–22–13
58	L	March 17	1–3	@ Montreal Canadiens (1948–49)	22–23–13
59	L	March 19	2–5	Detroit Red Wings (1948–49)	22–24–13
60	L	March 20	2–7	@ Boston Bruins (1948–49)	22–25–13

Legend: Win (2 points) Loss (0 points) Tie (1 point)

== Player statistics ==
=== Regular season ===
Scoring

Player	GP	G	A	Pts	PIM
Harry Watson	60	26	19	45	0
Max Bentley	60	19	22	41	18
Ted Kennedy	59	18	21	39	25
Cal Gardner	53	13	22	35	35
Bill Ezinicki	52	13	15	28	145
Joe Klukay	45	11	10	21	11
Jimmy Thomson	60	4	16	20	56
Vic Lynn	52	7	9	16	36
Ray Timgren	36	3	12	15	9
Gus Mortson	60	2	13	15	85
Howie Meeker	30	7	7	14	56
Harry Taylor	42	4	7	11	30
Garth Boesch	59	1	10	11	43
Don Metz	33	4	6	10	12
Bill Barilko	60	5	4	9	95
Tod Sloan	29	3	4	7	0
Les Costello	15	2	3	5	11
Bill Juzda	38	1	2	3	23
Frank Mathers	15	1	2	3	2
Ray Ceresino	12	1	1	2	2
Fleming MacKell	11	1	1	2	6
Bob Dawes	5	1	0	1	0
Al Buchanan	3	0	1	1	2
Chuck Blair	1	0	0	0	0
Turk Broda	60	0	0	0	0
Ray Hannigan	3	0	0	0	2
Stan Kemp	1	0	0	0	2
John McCormack	1	0	0	0	0
Sid Smith	1	0	0	0	0

Goaltending

Player	MIN	GP	W	L	T	GA	GAA	SA	SV	SV%	SO
Turk Broda	3600	60	22	25	13	161	2.68				5
Team:	3600	60	22	25	13	161	2.68				5

=== Playoffs ===
Scoring

Player	GP	G	A	Pts	PIM
Ted Kennedy	9	2	6	8	2
Sid Smith	6	5	2	7	0
Max Bentley	9	4	3	7	2
Cal Gardner	9	2	5	7	0
Harry Watson	9	4	2	6	2
Ray Timgren	9	3	3	6	2
Fleming MacKell	9	2	4	6	4
Jimmy Thomson	9	1	5	6	10
Joe Klukay	9	2	3	5	4
Bill Ezinicki	9	1	4	5	20
Gus Mortson	9	2	1	3	8
Garth Boesch	9	0	2	2	6
Bill Juzda	9	0	2	2	8
Bill Barilko	9	0	1	1	20
Vic Lynn	8	0	1	1	2
Turk Broda	9	0	0	0	2
Bob Dawes	9	0	0	0	2
Don Metz	3	0	0	0	0
Harry Taylor	1	0	0	0	0

Goaltending

Player	MIN	GP	W	L	T	GA	GAA	SA	SV	SV%	SO
Turk Broda	574	9	8	1		15	1.57				1
Team:	574	9	8	1		15	1.57				1

== Playoffs ==
=== Semifinals ===
Toronto Maple Leafs vs. Boston Bruins

Date	Away	Score	Home	Score	Notes
March 22	Toronto Maple Leafs	3	Boston Bruins	0	
March 24	Toronto Maple Leafs	3	Boston Bruins	2	
March 26	Boston Bruins	5	Toronto Maple Leafs	4	OT
March 29	Boston Bruins	1	Toronto Maple Leafs	3	
March 30	Toronto Maple Leafs	3	Boston Bruins	2	

Toronto won best-of-seven series 4 games to 1

=== Stanley Cup Finals ===
Detroit Red Wings vs. Toronto Maple Leafs

Date	Away	Score	Home	Score	Notes
April 8	Toronto	3	Detroit	2	OT
April 10	Toronto	3	Detroit	1	
April 13	Detroit	1	Toronto	3	
April 16	Detroit	1	Toronto	3	

Toronto won best-of-seven series 4–0.

== Transactions ==
- April 20, 1948: Acquired Eldie Kobussen from the Springfield Indians of the AHL for Gordie Bell, Armand Lemieux, Leo Curick and Rod Roy
- April 26, 1948: Acquired Cal Gardner, Bill Juzda, Rene Trudell and Frank Mathers from the New York Rangers for Wally Stanowski and Elwyn Morris
- July 27, 1948: Acquired Danny Lewicki from the Providence Reds of the AHL for Future Considerations
- October 27, 1948: Traded Jack Hamilton and cash to the Providence Reds of the AHL to complete a previous transaction
