= Nels Podolsky =

Canadian ice hockey player

- Born: December 18, 1923 Winnipeg, Manitoba, Canada
- Died: March 21, 2007 (aged 83) Sault Ste. Marie, Ontario, Canada
- Height: 5 ft 10 in (178 cm)
- Weight: 170 lb (77 kg; 12 st 2 lb)
- Position: Left wing
- Shot: Left
- Played for: Detroit Red Wings
- Playing career: 1942–1958

Nicholas "Nels" Podolsky, also spelled Podolski, (December 18, 1923 – March 21, 2007) was a Canadian professional ice hockey left winger who played in one regular season and seven playoff games in the National Hockey League with the Detroit Red Wings during the 1948–49 season. Podolsky was born in Winnipeg, Manitoba, but grew up in Kirkland Lake, Ontario. He died at Sault Ste. Marie in 2007.

== Career statistics ==
=== Regular season and playoffs ===
| | | | Regular season | | | | | Playoffs |
| Season | Team | League | GP | G | A | Pts | PIM | GP | G | A | Pts | PIM |
|---|---|---|---|---|---|---|---|---|---|---|---|---|
| 1942–43 | Montreal Junior Canadiens | QJAHA | 4 | 2 | 2 | 4 | 6 | 8 | 2 | 1 | 3 | 6 |
| 1942–43 | Montreal Royals | QSHL | 1 | 0 | 0 | 0 | 0 | — | — | — | — | — |
| 1943–44 | Galt Red Wings | OHA | 26 | 25 | 16 | 41 | 54 | 3 | 1 | 0 | 1 | 4 |
| 1944–45 | Halifax Navy | NSDHL | 3 | 0 | 0 | 0 | 6 | — | — | — | — | — |
| 1944–45 | Cornwallis Navy | NSDHL | — | — | — | — | — | — | — | — | — | — |
| 1945–46 | Omaha Knights | USHL | 44 | 9 | 13 | 22 | 64 | 7 | 2 | 3 | 5 | 4 |
| 1946–47 | Indianapolis Capitals | AHL | 61 | 8 | 7 | 15 | 96 | — | — | — | — | — |
| 1947–48 | Indianapolis Capitals | AHL | 68 | 25 | 30 | 55 | 57 | — | — | — | — | — |
| 1948–49 | Detroit Red Wings | NHL | 1 | 0 | 0 | 0 | 0 | 7 | 0 | 0 | 0 | 4 |
| 1948–49 | Indianapolis Capitals | AHL | 64 | 26 | 30 | 56 | 92 | 2 | 1 | 0 | 1 | 0 |
| 1949–50 | Indianapolis Capitals | AHL | 52 | 18 | 24 | 42 | 67 | 8 | 1 | 4 | 5 | 8 |
| 1950–51 | Indianapolis Capitals | AHL | 19 | 3 | 4 | 7 | 13 | 1 | 0 | 0 | 0 | 0 |
| 1951–52 | Edmonton Flyers | PCHL | 59 | 14 | 16 | 30 | 112 | 2 | 0 | 1 | 1 | 0 |
| 1952–53 | St. Louis Flyers | AHL | 18 | 2 | 6 | 8 | 39 | — | — | — | — | — |
| 1952–53 | Shawinigan Cataracts | QSHL | 47 | 15 | 19 | 34 | 93 | — | — | — | — | — |
| 1953–54 | Sherbrooke Saints | QSHL | 64 | 15 | 25 | 40 | 67 | 5 | 0 | 1 | 1 | 4 |
| 1954–55 | Troy Bruins | IHL | 60 | 16 | 18 | 34 | 156 | 11 | 1 | 4 | 5 | 9 |
| 1955–56 | Troy Bruins | IHL | 60 | 17 | 17 | 34 | 147 | 5 | 0 | 0 | 0 | 4 |
| 1956–57 | Troy Bruins | IHL | 52 | 9 | 14 | 23 | 105 | — | — | — | — | — |
| 1957–58 | Sault Ste. Marie Greyhounds | OHA Sr | 35 | 4 | 9 | 13 | 54 | 4 | 0 | 0 | 0 | 10 |
| AHL totals | | | 382 | 82 | 101 | 183 | 364 | 11 | 2 | 4 | 6 | 8 |
| NHL totals | | | 1 | 0 | 0 | 0 | 0 | — | — | — | — | — |
