= 1948–49 Detroit Red Wings season =

Sports season

1948–49 Detroit Red Wings
- League: 1st NHL
- 1948–49 record: 34–19–7
- Home record: 21–6–3
- Road record: 13–13–4
- Goals for: 195
- Goals against: 145

Team information
- General manager: Jack Adams
- Coach: Tommy Ivan
- Captain: Sid Abel
- Arena: Detroit Olympia

Team leaders
- Goals: Sid Abel (28)
- Assists: Ted Lindsay (28)
- Points: Sid Abel (54); Ted Lindsay (54)
- Penalty minutes: Jack Stewart (96)
- Wins: Harry Lumley (34)
- Goals against average: Harry Lumley (2.42)

The 1948–49 Detroit Red Wings season was the Red Wings' 23rd season.

== Regular season ==
=== Final standings ===
National Hockey League
		GP	W	L	T	GF	GA	DIFF	Pts
1	Detroit Red Wings	60	34	19	7	195	145	+50	75
2	Boston Bruins	60	29	23	8	178	163	+15	66
3	Montreal Canadiens	60	28	23	9	152	126	+26	65
4	Toronto Maple Leafs	60	22	25	13	147	161	−14	57
5	Chicago Black Hawks	60	21	31	8	173	211	−38	50
6	New York Rangers	60	18	31	11	133	172	−39	47

=== Record vs. opponents ===
1948–49 NHL Records
Team	BOS	CHI	DET	MTL	NYR	TOR
Boston	—	6–5–1	5–4–3	5–6–1	8–2–2	5–6–1
Chicago	5–6–1	—	3–9	3–7–2	6–5–1	4–4–4
Detroit	4–5–3	9–3	—	7–4–1	7–4–1	7–3–2
Montreal	6–5–1	7–3–2	4–7–1	—	5–4–3	6–4–2
New York	2–8–2	5–6–1	4–7–1	4–5–3	—	3–5–4
Toronto	6–5–1	4–4–4	3–7–2	4–6–2	5–3–4	—

== Schedule and results ==
1948–49 regular season
October

Game	Result	Date	Score	Opponent	Record
1	W	October 13, 1948	3–1	Chicago Black Hawks (1948–49)	1–0–0
2	W	October 17, 1948	7–0	New York Rangers (1948–49)	2–0–0
3	T	October 23, 1948	0–0	@ Montreal Canadiens (1948–49)	2–0–1
4	W	October 24, 1948	2–1	Toronto Maple Leafs (1948–49)	3–0–1
5	W	October 27, 1948	3–2	@ New York Rangers (1948–49)	4–0–1
6	L	October 30, 1948	1–2	@ Toronto Maple Leafs (1948–49)	4–1–1
7	W	October 31, 1948	4–1	Montreal Canadiens (1948–49)	5–1–1

November

Game	Result	Date	Score	Opponent	Record
8	L	November 6, 1948	0–2	@ Montreal Canadiens (1948–49)	5–2–1
9	W	November 7, 1948	7–3	Boston Bruins (1948–49)	6–2–1
10	L	November 11, 1948	1–4	@ Boston Bruins (1948–49)	6–3–1
11	W	November 14, 1948	3–1	@ Chicago Black Hawks (1948–49)	7–3–1
12	T	November 17, 1948	4–4	New York Rangers (1948–49)	7–3–2
13	L	November 21, 1948	0–3	Montreal Canadiens (1948–49)	7–4–2
14	L	November 24, 1948	3–5	Boston Bruins (1948–49)	7–5–2
15	L	November 27, 1948	3–5	Chicago Black Hawks (1948–49)	7–6–2
16	W	November 28, 1948	9–6	@ Chicago Black Hawks (1948–49)	8–6–2

December

Game	Result	Date	Score	Opponent	Record
17	W	December 1, 1948	5–3	Toronto Maple Leafs (1948–49)	9–6–2
18	W	December 4, 1948	3–2	@ Boston Bruins (1948–49)	10–6–2
19	W	December 5, 1948	3–1	@ New York Rangers (1948–49)	11–6–2
20	W	December 8, 1948	4–3	@ Toronto Maple Leafs (1948–49)	12–6–2
21	W	December 11, 1948	5–3	New York Rangers (1948–49)	13–6–2
22	L	December 12, 1948	0–2	@ New York Rangers (1948–49)	13–7–2
23	L	December 15, 1948	1–5	@ Chicago Black Hawks (1948–49)	13–8–2
24	L	December 18, 1948	3–5	@ Montreal Canadiens (1948–49)	13–9–2
25	W	December 19, 1948	5–1	Toronto Maple Leafs (1948–49)	14–9–2
26	L	December 22, 1948	2–5	@ Boston Bruins (1948–49)	14–10–2
27	L	December 25, 1948	1–2	@ Toronto Maple Leafs (1948–49)	14–11–2
28	W	December 26, 1948	3–1	Montreal Canadiens (1948–49)	15–11–2
29	W	December 29, 1948	10–2	Boston Bruins (1948–49)	16–11–2

January

Game	Result	Date	Score	Opponent	Record
30	L	January 1, 1949	3–5	@ Chicago Black Hawks (1948–49)	16–12–2
31	W	January 2, 1949	5–3	Chicago Black Hawks (1948–49)	17–12–2
32	L	January 6, 1949	2–3	Boston Bruins (1948–49)	17–13–2
33	W	January 8, 1949	4–1	@ Montreal Canadiens (1948–49)	18–13–2
34	T	January 9, 1949	2–2	Toronto Maple Leafs (1948–49)	18–13–3
35	W	January 12, 1949	4–1	@ New York Rangers (1948–49)	19–13–3
36	W	January 16, 1949	3–2	Montreal Canadiens (1948–49)	20–13–3
37	W	January 19, 1949	2–1	Chicago Black Hawks (1948–49)	21–13–3
38	T	January 22, 1949	2–2	@ Toronto Maple Leafs (1948–49)	21–13–4
39	W	January 23, 1949	2–1	Toronto Maple Leafs (1948–49)	22–13–4
40	L	January 26, 1949	1–5	New York Rangers (1948–49)	22–14–4
41	W	January 29, 1949	5–2	@ Montreal Canadiens (1948–49)	23–14–4
42	W	January 30, 1949	4–0	@ Boston Bruins (1948–49)	24–14–4

February

Game	Result	Date	Score	Opponent	Record
43	W	February 2, 1949	6–4	Chicago Black Hawks (1948–49)	25–14–4
44	W	February 3, 1949	4–2	@ Chicago Black Hawks (1948–49)	26–14–4
45	W	February 6, 1949	1–0	Montreal Canadiens (1948–49)	27–14–4
46	W	February 9, 1949	8–0	New York Rangers (1948–49)	28–14–4
47	L	February 12, 1949	1–3	@ Toronto Maple Leafs (1948–49)	28–15–4
48	T	February 13, 1949	4–4	@ Boston Bruins (1948–49)	28–15–5
49	L	February 16, 1949	0–4	@ New York Rangers (1948–49)	28–16–5
50	T	February 21, 1949	2–2	Boston Bruins (1948–49)	28–16–6
51	L	February 26, 1949	0–1	@ Montreal Canadiens (1948–49)	28–17–6
52	L	February 27, 1949	2–3	@ New York Rangers (1948–49)	28–18–6

March

Game	Result	Date	Score	Opponent	Record
53	T	March 2, 1949	1–1	@ Boston Bruins (1948–49)	28–18–7
54	W	March 5, 1949	6–5	Chicago Black Hawks (1948–49)	29–18–7
55	W	March 6, 1949	6–2	@ Chicago Black Hawks (1948–49)	30–18–7
56	W	March 9, 1949	5–0	Toronto Maple Leafs (1948–49)	31–18–7
57	L	March 13, 1949	2–6	Boston Bruins (1948–49)	31–19–7
58	W	March 16, 1949	6–2	New York Rangers (1948–49)	32–19–7
59	W	March 19, 1949	5–2	@ Toronto Maple Leafs (1948–49)	33–19–7
60	W	March 20, 1949	2–1	Montreal Canadiens (1948–49)	34–19–7

Legend: Win (2 points) Loss (0 points) Tie (1 point)

== Player statistics ==
=== Regular season ===
Scoring

Player	Pos	GP	G	A	Pts	PIM
Sid Abel	C/LW	60	28	26	54	49
Ted Lindsay	LW	50	26	28	54	97
Bud Poile	RW	56	21	21	42	6
Gordie Howe	RW	40	12	25	37	57
Jim McFadden	C	55	12	20	32	10
Pete Horeck	LW	60	14	16	30	46
Gerry Couture	RW	51	19	10	29	6
Marty Pavelich	LW	60	10	16	26	40
Max McNab	C	51	10	13	23	14
Bill Quackenbush	D	60	6	17	23	0
George Gee	C	47	7	12	19	27
Enio Sclisizzi	LW	50	9	8	17	24
Red Kelly	D/C	59	5	11	16	10
Jack Stewart	D	60	4	11	15	96
Leo Reise	D	59	3	7	10	60
Pat Lundy	C	15	4	3	7	4
Fern Gauthier	RW	41	3	2	5	2
Lee Fogolin Sr.	D	43	1	2	3	59
Jim Conacher	C	4	1	0	1	2
Don Morrison	C	13	0	1	1	0
Eddie Bruneteau	RW	1	0	0	0	0
Bep Guidolin	LW	4	0	0	0	0
Harry Lumley	G	60	0	0	0	12
Calum MacKay	LW	1	0	0	0	0
Doug McCaig	D	1	0	0	0	0
Nels Podolsky	LW	1	0	0	0	0

Goaltending

Player	MIN	GP	W	L	T	GA	GAA	SO
Harry Lumley	3600	60	34	19	7	145	2.42	6
Team:	3600	60	34	19	7	145	2.42	6

=== Playoffs ===
Scoring

Player	Pos	GP	G	A	Pts	PIM
Gordie Howe	RW	11	8	3	11	19
Ted Lindsay	LW	11	2	6	8	31
Sid Abel	C/LW	11	3	3	6	6
George Gee	C	10	1	3	4	22
Gerry Couture	RW	10	2	0	2	2
Pete Horeck	LW	11	1	1	2	10
Red Kelly	D/C	11	1	1	2	10
Bill Quackenbush	D	11	1	1	2	0
Jack Stewart	D	11	1	1	2	32
Max McNab	C	10	1	0	1	2
Leo Reise	D	11	1	0	1	4
Jim McFadden	C	8	0	1	1	6
Marty Pavelich	LW	9	0	1	1	8
Bud Poile	RW	10	0	1	1	2
Lee Fogolin Sr.	D	9	0	0	0	4
Fred Glover	C	2	0	0	0	0
Harry Lumley	G	11	0	0	0	2
Pat Lundy	C	4	0	0	0	0
Nels Podolsky	LW	7	0	0	0	4
Gerry Reid	C	2	0	0	0	2
Enio Sclisizzi	LW	6	0	0	0	2

Goaltending

Player	MIN	GP	W	L	GA	GAA	SO
Harry Lumley	726	11	4	7	26	2.15	0
Team:	726	11	4	7	26	2.15	0

Note: GP = Games played; G = Goals; A = Assists; Pts = Points; +/- = Plus-minus PIM = Penalty minutes; PPG = Power-play goals; SHG = Short-handed goals; GWG = Game-winning goals;
MIN = Minutes played; W = Wins; L = Losses; T = Ties; GA = Goals against; GAA = Goals-against average; SO = Shutouts;

== See also ==
- 1948–49 NHL season
