= Paul Ronty =

Canadian ice hockey player (1928–2020)

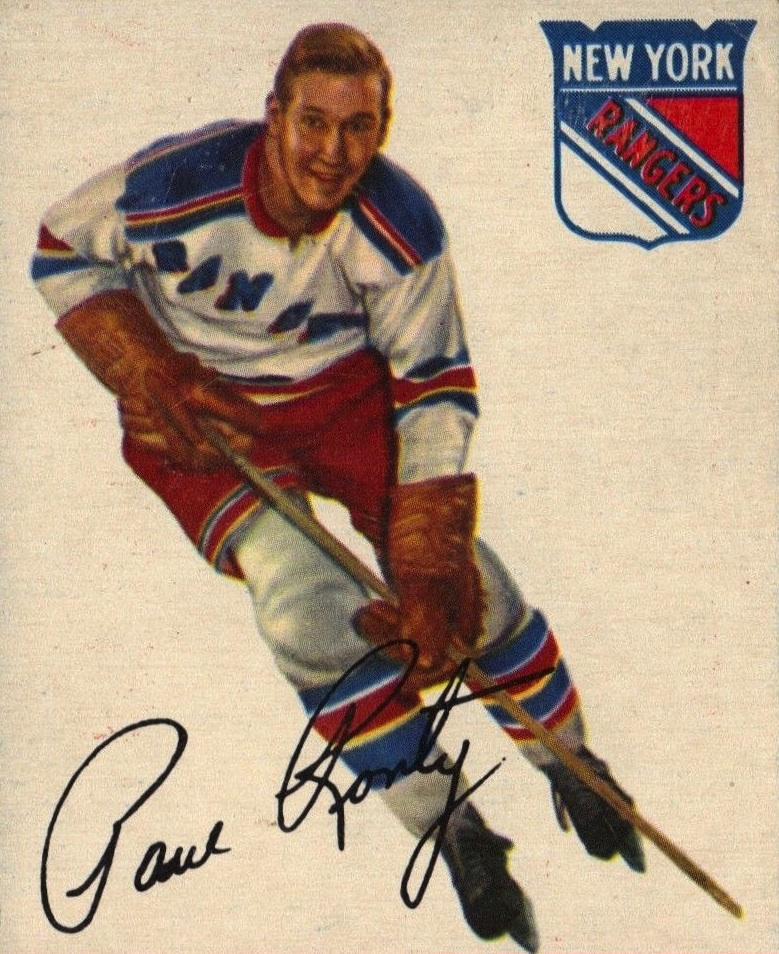
- Born: July 12, 1928 Toronto, Ontario, Canada
- Died: April 22, 2020 (aged 91) Newton, Massachusetts, US
- Height: 6 ft 0 in (183 cm)
- Weight: 160 lb (73 kg; 11 st 6 lb)
- Position: Centre
- Shot: Left
- Played for: Boston Bruins; New York Rangers; Montreal Canadiens
- Playing career: 1945–1955

Paul Ronty (July 12, 1928 – April 22, 2020) was a Canadian professional ice hockey centre. Ronty started his National Hockey League career with the Boston Bruins in 1947. He also played for the New York Rangers and Montreal Canadiens. He retired after the 1955 season. Three times during his career, he finished sixth in league scoring.

Ronty died on April 22, 2020, in Newton, Massachusetts, at the age of 91.

== Career statistics ==
			Regular season					Playoffs
Season	Team	League	GP	G	A	Pts	PIM	GP	G	A	Pts	PIM
1944–45	Toronto Chevies	Big-10 Jr. B	9	7	6	13	7	5	6	6	12	0
1944–45	Toronto Uptown Tires	TMHL	1	1	0	1	0	—	—	—	—	—
1945–46	Boston Olympics	EAHL	49	19	25	44	14	12	6	11	17	2
1946–47	Hershey Bears	AHL	64	19	40	59	12	11	0	2	2	2
1947–48	Boston Bruins	NHL	24	3	11	14	0	5	0	4	4	0
1947–48	Hershey Bears	AHL	31	15	24	39	2	—	—	—	—	—
1948–49	Boston Bruins	NHL	60	20	29	49	11	5	1	2	3	2
1949–50	Boston Bruins	NHL	70	23	36	59	8	—	—	—	—	—
1950–51	Boston Bruins	NHL	70	10	22	32	20	6	0	1	1	2
1951–52	New York Rangers	NHL	65	12	31	43	16	—	—	—	—	—
1952–53	New York Rangers	NHL	70	16	38	54	20	—	—	—	—	—
1953–54	New York Rangers	NHL	70	13	33	46	18	—	—	—	—	—
1954–55	New York Rangers	NHL	55	4	11	15	8	—	—	—	—	—
1954–55	Montreal Canadiens	NHL	4	0	0	0	2	5	0	0	0	2
NHL totals			488	101	211	312	103	21	1	7	8	6
