= 1947 Allan Cup =

Canadian senior ice hockey championship

The Allan Cup trophy

The 1947 Allan Cup was the Canadian senior ice hockey championship for the 1946–47 season.

== Final ==
Best of 7

- Montreal 7 Calgary 3
- Calgary 2 Montreal 1
- Montreal 7 Calgary 0
- Montreal 4 Calgary 3
- Calgary 1 Montreal 0
- Calgary 5 Montreal 2
- Montreal 8 Calgary 2

Montreal Royals beat Calgary Stampeders 4-3 on series.
