= 1948–49 NHL season =

National Hockey League season

- League: National Hockey League
- Sport: Ice hockey
- Duration: October 13, 1948 – April 16, 1949
- Games: 60
- Teams: 6

Regular season
- Season champion: Detroit Red Wings
- Season MVP: Sid Abel (Red Wings)
- Top scorer: Roy Conacher (Black Hawks)

Stanley Cup
- Champions: Toronto Maple Leafs
- Runners-up: Detroit Red Wings

NHL seasons
- ← 1947–48 1949–50 →

The 1948–49 NHL season was the 32nd season of the National Hockey League. Six teams played 60 games each. In a rematch of the previous season, Toronto defeated Detroit in the Stanley Cup Finals to win the championship.

== League business ==
=== Rule changes ===
A new rule, often called the "Durnan Rule", was introduced for the start of the season stating that goalies cannot be the captain or an alternate captain and wear the "C" or "A". Specifically, NHL Rule 14-D (today's rule 6.1) read: No playing Coach or playing Manager or goalkeeper shall be permitted to act as Captain or Alternate Captain.

This rule was introduced because Bill Durnan, Montreal Canadiens goalie and captain, would frequently leave his crease to dispute calls with the referees. Opposing teams claimed that this would give the Canadiens unscheduled timeouts during strategic points in games. It would be another sixty years before another goalie would be captain. From 2008 until 2010, the Vancouver Canucks had Roberto Luongo as their captain, the seventh goalie to serve as a captain in the NHL. The rule remained in place, however, and Luongo could not 'act' as captain during games.

== Regular season ==
Don Gallinger of the Boston Bruins, hopeful he could win an appeal of his suspension in the gambling scandal, finally admitted to gambling and was expelled from the NHL for life in September.

On October 8, 1948, the New York Rangers were due to start their season against the Montreal Canadiens, when the team suffered misfortune. Buddy O'Connor, Frank Eddolls, Edgar Laprade, Bill Moe, and Tony Leswick were travelling in their car from Montreal to Saranac Lake, New York when their car was struck by a truck near Rouses Point. O'Connor suffered several broken ribs, Eddolls a severed tendon in his knee, Laprade suffered a broken nose, Moe had a cut in the head requiring several stitches and Leswick escaped with a few bruises.

On November 10, 1948, unseasonably warm temperatures caused a fog bank to occur inside the Boston Garden during a game between the Boston Bruins and Detroit Red Wings. Referee Bill Chadwick abandoned the game after only 9 minutes of the first period due to poor visibility. The game was replayed the following night, with Boston winning 4–1.

A league record of ten major penalties was set November 25, 1948, when 11,000 fans at the Montreal Forum witnessed a donnybrook. It started when the Habs' Ken Mosdell elbowed Maple Leaf Gus Mortson. Mortson retaliated by knocking Elliot de Grey down with his stick. Montreal's Maurice Richard then sprang onto Mortson's back and they fought, and then all hands joined in. Mortson, Richard, Toronto's Howie Meeker and Mosdell were banished with majors. Play had scarcely begun when Ken Reardon (Montreal) and Joe Klukay (Toronto) began fencing and Bill Barilko went at Reardon, while Klukay got into it with Billy Reay, and Hal Laycoe fought Garth Boesch. In the game itself, Turk Broda picked up his first shutout of the year as the Leafs won, 2–0.

Both Detroit and Montreal lost key players to injury this year. Montreal lost Elmer Lach with a fractured jaw when he collided with Toronto defenceman Bob Goldham, and Emile "Butch" Bouchard injured a knee. Detroit lost Gordie Howe, who underwent knee surgery.

Bill Durnan got hot in the second half of the season and recorded four consecutive shutouts, going 309 minutes and 21 seconds without giving up a goal. In all, Durnan had 10 shutouts and won his fifth Vezina Trophy in six years.

=== Final standings ===
National Hockey League
		GP	W	L	T	GF	GA	DIFF	Pts
1	Detroit Red Wings	60	34	19	7	195	145	+50	75
2	Boston Bruins	60	29	23	8	178	163	+15	66
3	Montreal Canadiens	60	28	23	9	152	126	+26	65
4	Toronto Maple Leafs	60	22	25	13	147	161	−14	57
5	Chicago Black Hawks	60	21	31	8	173	211	−38	50
6	New York Rangers	60	18	31	11	133	172	−39	47

== Playoffs ==
=== Playoff bracket ===
The top four teams in the league qualified for the playoffs. In the semifinals, the first-place team played the third-place team, while the second-place team faced the fourth-place team, with the winners advancing to the Stanley Cup Finals. In both rounds, teams competed in a best-of-seven series (scores in the bracket indicate the number of games won in each best-of-seven series).

Semifinals
1	Detroit	4
3	Montreal	3
2	Boston	1
4	Toronto	4

Stanley Cup Finals
1	Detroit	0
4	Toronto	4

=== Semifinals ===
==== (1) Detroit Red Wings vs. (3) Montreal Canadiens ====
March 22	Montreal Canadiens	1–2	3OT	Detroit Red Wings	Olympia Stadium	Recap
No scoring		First period		No scoring
No scoring		Second period		04:13 – Gordie Howe (1)
Maurice Richard (1) – 12:29		Third period		No scoring
No scoring		Third overtime period		04:52 – pp – Max McNab (1)
Bill Durnan		Goalie stats		Harry Lumley

March 24	Montreal Canadiens	4–3	OT	Detroit Red Wings	Olympia Stadium	Recap
Gerry Plamondon (1) – pp – 04:23		First period		01:31 – Sid Abel (1)
No scoring		Second period		No scoring
Billy Reay (1) – pp – 04:46; Gerry Plamondon (2) – pp – 06:01		Third period		00:50 – pp – Ted Lindsay (1); 16:49 – Sid Abel (2)
Gerry Plamondon (3) – 02:59		First overtime period		No scoring
Bill Durnan		Goalie stats		Harry Lumley

March 26	Detroit Red Wings	2–3	Montreal Canadiens	Montreal Forum	Recap
No scoring		First period	10:41 – Ken Mosdell (1); 18:24 – Leo Gravelle (1)
No scoring		Second period	No scoring
Gordie Howe (2) – 08:07; Gordie Howe (3) – sh – 15:03		Third period	10:02 – Murdo MacKay (1)
Harry Lumley		Goalie stats	Bill Durnan

March 29	Detroit Red Wings	3–1	Montreal Canadiens	Montreal Forum	Recap
Red Kelly (1) – sh – 08:34		First period	04:43 – Leo Gravelle (2)
Gordie Howe (4) – 18:38		Second period	No scoring
Gordie Howe (5) – 13:19		Third period	No scoring
Harry Lumley		Goalie stats	Bill Durnan

March 31	Montreal Canadiens	1–3	Detroit Red Wings	Olympia Stadium	Recap
No scoring		First period	No scoring
Rip Riopelle (1) – 01:11		Second period	No scoring
No scoring		Third period	05:10 – Sid Abel (3); 16:28 – Gerry Couture (1); 17:00 – Gordie Howe (6)
Bill Durnan		Goalie stats	Harry Lumley

April 2	Detroit Red Wings	1–3	Montreal Canadiens	Montreal Forum	Recap
No scoring		First period	No scoring
Gordie Howe (7) – pp – 12:56		Second period	06:41 – Gerry Plamondon (4); 08:44 – Maurice Richard (2); 09:56 – pp – 09:56
No scoring		Third period	No scoring
Harry Lumley		Goalie stats	Bill Durnan

April 5	Montreal Canadiens	1–3	Detroit Red Wings	Olympia Stadium	Recap
No scoring		First period	03:17 – Gordie Howe (8)
Glen Harmon (1) – 06:33		Second period	12:10 – sh – Leo Reise (1); 18:46 – pp – Gerry Couture (2)
No scoring		Third period	No scoring
Bill Durnan		Goalie stats	Harry Lumley

Detroit won series 4–3

==== (2) Boston Bruins vs. (4) Toronto Maple Leafs ====
March 22	Toronto Maple Leafs	3–0	Boston Bruins	Boston Garden	Recap
Harry Watson (1) – pp – 05:15		First period	No scoring
Harry Watson (2) – 07:25		Second period	No scoring
Max Bentley (1) – 07:50		Third period	No scoring
Turk Broda		Goalie stats	Frank Brimsek

March 24	Toronto Maple Leafs	3–2	Boston Bruins	Boston Garden	Recap
Ray Timgren (1) – pp – 03:36		First period	05:02 – sh – Woody Dumart (1)
No scoring		Second period	17:24 – Paul Ronty (1)
Harry Watson (3) – 10:57; Harry Watson (4) – 18:41		Third period	No scoring
Turk Broda		Goalie stats	Frank Brimsek

March 26	Boston Bruins	5–4	OT	Toronto Maple Leafs	Maple Leaf Gardens	Recap
Grant Warwick (1) – 09:56; Woody Dumart (2) – 17:16		First period		08:46 – Ted Kennedy
Johnny Peirson (1) – pp – 13:53		Second period		14:15 – sh – Gus Mortson (1); 19:57 – Joe Klukay (1)
Ed Sandford (1) – 07:11		Third period		11:49 – Fleming MacKell (1)
Woody Dumart (3) – 16:14		First overtime period		No scoring
Frank Brimsek		Goalie stats		Turk Broda

March 29	Boston Bruins	1–3	Toronto Maple Leafs	Maple Leaf Gardens	Recap
Johnny Peirson (2) – pp – 11:16		First period	03:18 – Fleming MacKell (2)
No scoring		Second period	10:30 – Sid Smith (1)
No scoring		Third period	15:17 – pp – Sid Smith (2)
Frank Brimsek		Goalie stats	Turk Broda

March 30	Toronto Maple Leafs	3–2	Boston Bruins	Boston Garden	Recap
Cal Gardner (1) – pp – 06:27; Ray Timgren (2) – 14:58		First period	12:17 – pp – Grant Warwick (2)
Max Bentley (2) – 08:01		Second period	No scoring
No scoring		Third period	19:03 – Johnny Peirson (3)
Turk Broda		Goalie stats	Frank Brimsek

Toronto won series 4–1

=== Stanley Cup Finals ===
April 8	Toronto Maple Leafs	3–2	OT	Detroit Red Wings	Olympia Stadium	Recap
Max Bentley (3) – 13:15		First period		04:15 – pp – George Gee (1)
Jimmy Thomson (1) – pp – 16:02		Second period		No scoring
No scoring		Third period		13:56 – Bill Quackenbush (1)
Joe Klukay (2) – 17:13		First overtime period		No scoring
Turk Broda		Goalie stats		Harry Lumley

April 10	Toronto Maple Leafs	3–1	Detroit Red Wings	Olympia Stadium	Recap
Sid Smith (3) – pp – 08:50; Sid Smith (4) – pp – 09:56		First period	No scoring
Sid Smith (5) – pp – 17:58		Second period	No scoring
No scoring		Third period	05:50 – Pete Horeck (1)
Turk Broda		Goalie stats	Harry Lumley

April 13	Detroit Red Wings	1–3	Toronto Maple Leafs	Maple Leaf Gardens	Recap
Jack Stewart (1) – 04:57		First period	No scoring
Bill Ezinicki (1) – 11:02; Ted Kennedy (2) – 12:40; Gus Mortson (2) – 16:18		Second period	No scoring
No scoring		Third period	No scoring
Harry Lumley		Goalie stats	Turk Broda

April 16	Detroit Red Wings	1–3	Toronto Maple Leafs	Maple Leaf Gardens	Recap
Ted Lindsay (2) – 02:59		First period	No scoring
No scoring		Second period	10:10 – pp – Ray Timgren (3); 19:45 – Cal Gardner (2)
No scoring		Third period	15:10 – Max Bentley (4)
Harry Lumley		Goalie stats	Turk Broda

Toronto won series 4–0

== Awards ==
Trophy	Winner
Calder Memorial Trophy: (Top first-year player)	Pentti Lund, New York Rangers
Hart Trophy: (Most valuable player)	Sid Abel, Detroit Red Wings
Lady Byng Trophy: (Excellence and sportsmanship)	Bill Quackenbush, Detroit Red Wings
O'Brien Cup: (Stanley Cup runner-up)	Detroit Red Wings
Prince of Wales Trophy: (Top regular-season record)	Detroit Red Wings
Art Ross Trophy: (Top scorer)	Roy Conacher, Chicago Black Hawks
Vezina Trophy: (Goaltender of team with lowest GAA)	Bill Durnan, Montreal Canadiens

=== All-Star teams ===
First team	Position	Second team
Bill Durnan, Montreal Canadiens	G	Chuck Rayner, New York Rangers
Bill Quackenbush, Detroit Red Wings	D	Glen Harmon, Montreal Canadiens
Jack Stewart, Detroit Red Wings	D	Ken Reardon, Montreal Canadiens
Sid Abel, Detroit Red Wings	C	Doug Bentley, Chicago Black Hawks
Maurice Richard, Montreal Canadiens	RW	Gordie Howe, Detroit Red Wings
Roy Conacher, Chicago Black Hawks	LW	Ted Lindsay, Detroit Red Wings

== Player statistics ==
=== Scoring leaders ===
Note: GP = Games played, G = Goals, A = Assists, PTS = Points, PIM = Penalties in minutes

Player	Team	GP	G	A	Pts	PIM
Roy Conacher	Chicago Black Hawks	60	26	42	68	8
Doug Bentley	Chicago Black Hawks	58	23	43	66	38
Sid Abel	Detroit Red Wings	60	28	26	54	49
Ted Lindsay	Detroit Red Wings	50	26	28	54	97
Jim Conacher	Detroit Red Wings / Chicago Black Hawks	59	26	23	49	43
Paul Ronty	Boston Bruins	60	20	29	49	11
Harry Watson	Toronto Maple Leafs	60	26	19	45	0
Billy Reay	Montreal Canadiens	60	22	23	45	33
Gus Bodnar	Chicago Black Hawks	59	19	26	45	14
Johnny Peirson	Boston Bruins	59	22	21	43	45

Source: NHL

=== Leading goaltenders ===
Note: GP = Games played; Mins = Minutes played; GA = Goals against; GAA = Goals against average; W = Wins; L = Losses; T = Ties; SO = Shutouts

Player	Team	GP	Mins	GA	GAA	W	L	T	SO
Bill Durnan	Montreal Canadiens	60	3600	126	2.10	28	23	9	10
Harry Lumley	Detroit Red Wings	60	3600	145	2.42	34	19	7	6
Turk Broda	Toronto Maple Leafs	60	3600	161	2.68	22	25	13	5
Frank Brimsek	Boston Bruins	54	3240	147	2.72	26	20	8	1
Chuck Rayner	New York Rangers	58	3480	168	2.90	16	31	11	7
Jim Henry	Chicago Black Hawks	60	3600	211	3.52	21	31	8	0

== Coaches ==
- Boston Bruins: Dit Clapper
- Chicago Black Hawks: Charlie Conacher
- Detroit Red Wings: Tommy Ivan
- Montreal Canadiens: Dick Irvin
- New York Rangers: Lynn Patrick
- Toronto Maple Leafs: Hap Day

== Debuts ==
The following is a list of players of note who played their first NHL game in 1948–49 (listed with their first team, asterisk(*) marks debut in playoffs):

- Jack Gelineau, Boston Bruins
- Dave Creighton, Boston Bruins

== Last games ==
The following is a list of players of note who played their last game in the NHL in 1948–49 (listed with their last team):

- Neil Colville, New York Rangers

== See also ==
- 1948–49 NHL transactions
- List of Stanley Cup champions
- 2nd National Hockey League All-Star Game
- National Hockey League All-Star Game
- 1948 in sports
- 1949 in sports
