= List of Toronto Maple Leafs award winners =

Toronto Maple Leafs awards
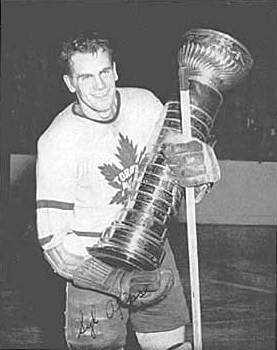
- Syl Apps with the Stanley Cup in 1942

Team trophies
- Award*: Wins
- Stanley Cup: 13
- Prince of Wales Trophy: 2
- O'Brien Trophy: 9

Individual awards
- Award*: Wins
- Bill Masterton Memorial Trophy: 1
- Calder Memorial Trophy: 10
- Charlie Conacher Memorial Trophy: 2
- Conn Smythe Trophy: 1
- Frank J. Selke Trophy: 1
- Hart Memorial Trophy: 3
- Jack Adams Award: 1
- King Clancy Memorial Trophy: 1
- Lady Byng Memorial Trophy: 9
- Mark Messier Leadership Award: 1
- Maurice "Rocket" Richard Trophy: 3
- Ted Lindsay Award: 1
- Vezina Trophy: 6

Total
- Awards won: 64

This is a list of award winners of the Toronto Maple Leafs and predecessor clubs of the Toronto NHL franchise.

== League awards ==
=== Team trophies ===
Team trophies awarded to the Toronto Maple Leafs
| Award | Description | Times won | Seasons | References |
|---|---|---|---|---|
| Stanley Cup | NHA/NHL vs. PCHA/WCHL/WHL championship (1914–26) | 2 | 1917–18, 1921–22 | |
| Stanley Cup | NHL championship (1926–present) | 11 | 1931–32, 1941–42, 1944–45, 1946–47, 1947–48, 1948–49, 1950–51, 1961–62, 1962–63, 1963–64, 1966–67 | |
| O'Brien Trophy | NHL playoff championship (1917–23) | 2 | 1917–18, 1921–22 | |
| O'Brien Trophy | Canadian Division champion (1927–38) | 5 | 1927–28, 1932–33, 1933–34, 1934–35, 1937–38 | |
| O'Brien Trophy | NHL championship runner-up (1938–50) | 2 | 1938–39, 1939–40 | |
| Prince of Wales Trophy | Regular season championship (1938–67) | 2 | 1947–48, 1962–63 | |

=== Individual awards ===
Ten different Leafs have won the Calder Memorial Trophy, more than any other team.

Individual awards won by Toronto Maple Leafs players and staff
| Award | Description | Winner | Season | References |
|---|---|---|---|---|
| Bill Masterton Memorial Trophy | Perseverance, sportsmanship and dedication to hockey | Jason Blake | 2007–08 | |
| Calder Memorial Trophy | Rookie of the year | Syl Apps | 1936–37 | |
| Calder Memorial Trophy | Rookie of the year | Gaye Stewart | 1942–43 | |
| Calder Memorial Trophy | Rookie of the year | Gus Bodnar | 1943–44 | |
| Calder Memorial Trophy | Rookie of the year | Frank McCool | 1944–45 | |
| Calder Memorial Trophy | Rookie of the year | Howie Meeker | 1946–47 | |
| Calder Memorial Trophy | Rookie of the year | Frank Mahovlich | 1957–58 | |
| Calder Memorial Trophy | Rookie of the year | Dave Keon | 1960–61 | |
| Calder Memorial Trophy | Rookie of the year | Kent Douglas | 1962–63 | |
| Calder Memorial Trophy | Rookie of the year | Brit Selby | 1965–66 | |
| Calder Memorial Trophy | Rookie of the year | Auston Matthews | 2016–17 | |
| Conn Smythe Trophy | Most valuable player of the playoffs | Dave Keon | 1966–67 | |
| Frank J. Selke Trophy | Forward who best excels in the defensive aspect of the game | Doug Gilmour | 1992–93 | |
| Hart Memorial Trophy | Most valuable player to his team during the regular season | Babe Pratt | 1943–44 | |
| Hart Memorial Trophy | Most valuable player to his team during the regular season | Ted Kennedy | 1954–55 | |
| Hart Memorial Trophy | Most valuable player to his team during the regular season | Auston Matthews | 2021–22 | |
| Jack Adams Award | Top coach during the regular season | Pat Burns | 1992–93 | |
| King Clancy Memorial Trophy | Leadership qualities on and off the ice and humanitarian contributions within their community | Curtis Joseph | 1999–2000 | \ |
| Lady Byng Memorial Trophy | Gentlemanly conduct | Joe Primeau | 1931–32 | |
| Lady Byng Memorial Trophy | Gentlemanly conduct | Gordie Drillon | 1937–38 | |
| Lady Byng Memorial Trophy | Gentlemanly conduct | Syl Apps | 1941–42 | |
| Lady Byng Memorial Trophy | Gentlemanly conduct | Sid Smith | 1951–52 | |
| Lady Byng Memorial Trophy | Gentlemanly conduct | Sid Smith | 1954–55 | |
| Lady Byng Memorial Trophy | Gentlemanly conduct | Red Kelly | 1960–61 | |
| Lady Byng Memorial Trophy | Gentlemanly conduct | Dave Keon | 1961–62 | |
| Lady Byng Memorial Trophy | Gentlemanly conduct | Dave Keon | 1962–63 | |
| Lady Byng Memorial Trophy | Gentlemanly conduct | Alexander Mogilny | 2002–03 | |
| Mark Messier Leadership Award | Player who exemplifies leadership on and off the ice | Mats Sundin | 2007–08 | |
| Maurice "Rocket" Richard Trophy | Most goals in the regular season | Auston Matthews | 2020–21 | |
| Maurice "Rocket" Richard Trophy | Most goals in the regular season | Auston Matthews | 2021–22 | |
| Maurice "Rocket" Richard Trophy | Most goals in the regular season | Auston Matthews | 2023–24 | |
| Ted Lindsay Award | Most valuable player as chosen by the players | Auston Matthews | 2021–22 | |
| Vezina Trophy | Fewest goals given up in the regular season (1927–1981) | Turk Broda | 1940–41 | |
| Vezina Trophy | Fewest goals given up in the regular season (1927–1981) | Turk Broda | 1947–48 | |
| Vezina Trophy | Fewest goals given up in the regular season (1927–1981) | Al Rollins | 1950–51 | |
| Vezina Trophy | Fewest goals given up in the regular season (1927–1981) | Harry Lumley | 1953–54 | |
| Vezina Trophy | Fewest goals given up in the regular season (1927–1981) | Johnny Bower | 1960–61 | |
| Vezina Trophy | Fewest goals given up in the regular season (1927–1981) | Johnny Bower | 1964–65 | |
| Vezina Trophy | Fewest goals given up in the regular season (1927–1981) | Terry Sawchuk | 1964–65 | |

== All-Stars ==
=== NHL first and second team All-Stars ===
The NHL first and second team All-Stars are the top players at each position as voted on by the Professional Hockey Writers' Association.

Toronto Maple Leafs selected to the NHL First and Second Team All-Stars
| Player | Position | Selections | Season | Team |
|---|---|---|---|---|
| Syl Apps | Centre | 5 | 1937–38 | 2nd |
| Syl Apps | Centre | 5 | 1938–39 | 1st |
| Syl Apps | Centre | 5 | 1940–41 | 2nd |
| Syl Apps | Centre | 5 | 1941–42 | 1st |
| Syl Apps | Centre | 5 | 1942–43 | 2nd |
| Paul Bibeault | Goaltender | 1 | 1943–44 | 2nd |
| Johnny Bower | Goaltender | 1 | 1960–61 | 1st |
| Carl Brewer | Defence | 3 | 1961–62 | 2nd |
| Carl Brewer | Defence | 3 | 1962–63 | 1st |
| Carl Brewer | Defence | 3 | 1964–65 | 2nd |
| Turk Broda | Goaltender | 3 | 1940–41 | 1st |
| Turk Broda | Goaltender | 3 | 1941–42 | 2nd |
| Turk Broda | Goaltender | 3 | 1947–48 | 1st |
| Lorne Carr | Right wing | 2 | 1942–43 | 1st |
| Lorne Carr | Right wing | 2 | 1943–44 | 1st |
| King Clancy | Defence | 4 | 1930–31 | 1st |
| King Clancy | Defence | 4 | 1931–32 | 2nd |
| King Clancy | Defence | 4 | 1932–33 | 2nd |
| King Clancy | Defence | 4 | 1933–34 | 1st |
| Charlie Conacher | Right wing | 5 | 1931–32 | 2nd |
| Charlie Conacher | Right wing | 5 | 1932–33 | 2nd |
| Charlie Conacher | Right wing | 5 | 1933–34 | 1st |
| Charlie Conacher | Right wing | 5 | 1934–35 | 1st |
| Charlie Conacher | Right wing | 5 | 1935–36 | 1st |
| Hap Day | Coach | 1 | 1943–44 | 2nd |
| Gordie Drillon | Right wing | 3 | 1937–38 | 1st |
| Gordie Drillon | Right wing | 3 | 1938–39 | 1st |
| Gordie Drillon | Right wing | 3 | 1941–42 | 2nd |
| Tim Horton | Defence | 6 | 1953–54 | 2nd |
| Tim Horton | Defence | 6 | 1962–63 | 2nd |
| Tim Horton | Defence | 6 | 1963–64 | 1st |
| Tim Horton | Defence | 6 | 1966–67 | 2nd |
| Tim Horton | Defence | 6 | 1967–68 | 1st |
| Tim Horton | Defence | 6 | 1968–69 | 1st |
| Dick Irvin | Coach | 4 | 1931–32 | 2nd |
| Dick Irvin | Coach | 4 | 1932–33 | 2nd |
| Dick Irvin | Coach | 4 | 1933–34 | 2nd |
| Dick Irvin | Coach | 4 | 1934–35 | 2nd |
| Busher Jackson | Left wing | 5 | 1931–32 | 1st |
| Busher Jackson | Left wing | 5 | 1932–33 | 2nd |
| Busher Jackson | Left wing | 5 | 1933–34 | 1st |
| Busher Jackson | Left wing | 5 | 1934–35 | 1st |
| Busher Jackson | Left wing | 5 | 1936–37 | 1st |
| Ted Kennedy | Centre | 3 | 1949–50 | 2nd |
| Ted Kennedy | Centre | 3 | 1950–51 | 2nd |
| Ted Kennedy | Centre | 3 | 1953–54 | 2nd |
| Dave Keon | Centre | 2 | 1961–62 | 2nd |
| Dave Keon | Centre | 2 | 1970–71 | 2nd |
| Harry Lumley | Goaltender | 2 | 1953–54 | 1st |
| Harry Lumley | Goaltender | 2 | 1954–55 | 1st |
| Frank Mahovlich | Left wing | 6 | 1960–61 | 1st |
| Frank Mahovlich | Left wing | 6 | 1961–62 | 2nd |
| Frank Mahovlich | Left wing | 6 | 1962–63 | 1st |
| Frank Mahovlich | Left wing | 6 | 1963–64 | 2nd |
| Frank Mahovlich | Left wing | 6 | 1964–65 | 2nd |
| Frank Mahovlich | Left wing | 6 | 1965–66 | 2nd |
| Mitch Marner | Right wing | 2 | 2020–21 | 1st |
| Mitch Marner | Right wing | 2 | 2021–22 | 1st |
| Auston Matthews | Centre | 2 | 2020–21 | 2nd |
| Auston Matthews | Centre | 2 | 2021–22 | 1st |
| Bryan McCabe | Defence | 1 | 2003–04 | 2nd |
| Lanny McDonald | Right wing | 1 | 1976–77 | 2nd |
| Wilfred McDonald | Defence | 1 | 1941–42 | 2nd |
| Gus Mortson | Defence | 1 | 1949–50 | 1st |
| Jacques Plante | Goaltender | 1 | 1970–71 | 2nd |
| Babe Pratt | Defence | 2 | 1943–44 | 1st |
| Babe Pratt | Defence | 2 | 1944–45 | 2nd |
| Joe Primeau | Centre | 1 | 1933–34 | 2nd |
| Borje Salming | Defence | 6 | 1974–75 | 2nd |
| Borje Salming | Defence | 6 | 1975–76 | 2nd |
| Borje Salming | Defence | 6 | 1976–77 | 1st |
| Borje Salming | Defence | 6 | 1977–78 | 2nd |
| Borje Salming | Defence | 6 | 1978–79 | 2nd |
| Borje Salming | Defence | 6 | 1979–80 | 2nd |
| Sweeney Schriner | Left wing | 1 | 1940–41 | 1st |
| Darryl Sittler | Centre | 1 | 1977–78 | 2nd |
| Tod Sloan | Centre | 1 | 1955–56 | 2nd |
| Sid Smith | Left wing | 3 | 1950–51 | 2nd |
| Sid Smith | Left wing | 3 | 1951–52 | 2nd |
| Sid Smith | Left wing | 3 | 1954–55 | 1st |
| Allan Stanley | Defence | 3 | 1959–60 | 2nd |
| Allan Stanley | Defence | 3 | 1960–61 | 2nd |
| Allan Stanley | Defence | 3 | 1965–66 | 2nd |
| Wally Stanowski | Defence | 1 | 1940–41 | 1st |
| Gaye Stewart | Left wing | 1 | 1945–46 | 1st |
| Mats Sundin | Centre | 2 | 2001–02 | 2nd |
| Mats Sundin | Centre | 2 | 2003–04 | 2nd |
| Bill Thoms | Centre | 1 | 1935–36 | 2nd |
| Jimmy Thomson | Defence | 2 | 1950–51 | 2nd |
| Jimmy Thomson | Defence | 2 | 1951–52 | 2nd |

=== NHL All-Rookie Team ===
The NHL All-Rookie Team consists of the top rookies at each position as voted on by the Professional Hockey Writers' Association.

Toronto Maple Leafs selected to the NHL All-Rookie Team
| Player | Position | Season |
|---|---|---|
| Sergei Berezin | Forward | 1996–97 |
| Michael Bunting | Forward | 2021–22 |
| Wendel Clark | Forward | 1985–86 |
| Dan Daoust | Forward | 1982–83 |
| Jake Gardiner | Defence | 2011–12 |
| Mike Johnson | Forward | 1997–98 |
| Kenny Jonsson | Defence | 1994–95 |
| Mitch Marner | Forward | 2016–17 |
| Auston Matthews | Forward | 2016–17 |
| Felix Potvin | Goaltender | 1992–93 |
| Luke Schenn | Defence | 2008–09 |

=== All-Star Game selections ===
The National Hockey League All-Star Game is a mid-season exhibition game held annually between many of the top players of each season. Sixty-four All-Star Games have been held since 1947, with at least one player chosen to represent the Maple Leafs in each year. The All-Star game has not been held in various years: 1979 and 1987 due to the 1979 Challenge Cup and Rendez-vous '87 series between the NHL and the Soviet national team, respectively, 1995, 2005, and 2013 as a result of labor stoppages, 2006, 2010, 2014 and 2026 because of the Winter Olympic Games, 2021 as a result of the COVID-19 pandemic, and 2025 when it was replaced by the 2025 4 Nations Face-Off. Toronto has hosted eight of the games.

- † Selected by fan vote
- # Selected as one of four "last men in" by fan vote
- ↑ All-Star Game Most Valuable Player

Toronto Maple Leafs players and coaches selected to the All-Star Game
| Game | Year | Name | Position | References |
|---|---|---|---|---|
| 1st | 1947 | Syl Apps | Centre | |
| 1st | 1947 | Bill Barilko | Defence | |
| 1st | 1947 | Turk Broda | Goaltender | |
| 1st | 1947 | Hap Day | Coach | |
| 1st | 1947 | Bill Ezinicki | Right wing | |
| 1st | 1947 | Bob Goldham | Defence | |
| 1st | 1947 | Ted Kennedy | Centre | |
| 1st | 1947 | Joe Klukay | Left wing | |
| 1st | 1947 | Vic Lynn | Defence | |
| 1st | 1947 | Fleming MacKell | Centre | |
| 1st | 1947 | Howie Meeker | Right wing | |
| 1st | 1947 | Don Metz | Right wing | |
| 1st | 1947 | Gus Mortson | Defence | |
| 1st | 1947 | Bud Poile | Centre | |
| 1st | 1947 | Wally Stanowski | Defence | |
| 1st | 1947 | Gaye Stewart | Left wing | |
| 1st | 1947 | Jimmy Thomson | Defence | |
| 1st | 1947 | Harry Watson | Left wing | |
| 2nd | 1948 | Bill Barilko | Defence | |
| 2nd | 1948 | Max Bentley | Centre | |
| 2nd | 1948 | Garth Boesch | Defence | |
| 2nd | 1948 | Turk Broda | Goaltender | |
| 2nd | 1948 | Les Costello | Left wing | |
| 2nd | 1948 | Hap Day | Coach | |
| 2nd | 1948 | Bill Ezinicki | Right wing | |
| 2nd | 1948 | Cal Gardner | Centre | |
| 2nd | 1948 | Bill Juzda | Defence | |
| 2nd | 1948 | Ted Kennedy | Centre | |
| 2nd | 1948 | Joe Klukay | Left wing | |
| 2nd | 1948 | Vic Lynn | Defence | |
| 2nd | 1948 | Fleming MacKell | Centre | |
| 2nd | 1948 | Frank Mathers | Defence | |
| 2nd | 1948 | Howie Meeker | Right wing | |
| 2nd | 1948 | Gus Mortson | Defence | |
| 2nd | 1948 | Jimmy Thomson | Defence | |
| 2nd | 1948 | Harry Watson | Left wing | |
| 3rd | 1949 | Bill Barilko | Defence | |
| 3rd | 1949 | Max Bentley | Centre | |
| 3rd | 1949 | Garth Boesch | Defence | |
| 3rd | 1949 | Turk Broda | Goaltender | |
| 3rd | 1949 | Bob Dawes | Defence | |
| 3rd | 1949 | Hap Day | Coach | |
| 3rd | 1949 | Cal Gardner | Centre | |
| 3rd | 1949 | Bill Juzda | Defence | |
| 3rd | 1949 | Ted Kennedy | Centre | |
| 3rd | 1949 | Joe Klukay | Left wing | |
| 3rd | 1949 | Vic Lynn | Defence | |
| 3rd | 1949 | Fleming MacKell | Centre | |
| 3rd | 1949 | Howie Meeker | Right wing | |
| 3rd | 1949 | Sid Smith | Left wing | |
| 3rd | 1949 | Jimmy Thomson | Defence | |
| 3rd | 1949 | Ray Timgren | Left wing | |
| 3rd | 1949 | Harry Watson | Left wing | |
| 4th | 1950 | Turk Broda | Goaltender | |
| 4th | 1950 | Ted Kennedy | Centre | |
| 4th | 1950 | Gus Mortson | Defence | |
| 4th | 1950 | Sid Smith | Left wing | |
| 4th | 1950 | Jimmy Thomson | Defence | |
| 5th | 1951 | Max Bentley | Centre | |
| 5th | 1951 | Ted Kennedy | Centre | |
| 5th | 1951 | Gus Mortson | Defence | |
| 5th | 1951 | Joe Primeau | Coach | |
| 5th | 1951 | Tod Sloan | Centre | |
| 5th | 1951 | Sid Smith | Left wing | |
| 5th | 1951 | Jimmy Thomson | Defence | |
| 5th | 1951 | Harry Watson | Left wing | |
| 6th | 1952 | Fernie Flaman | Defence | |
| 6th | 1952 | Gus Mortson | Defence | |
| 6th | 1952 | Tod Sloan | Centre | |
| 6th | 1952 | Sid Smith | Left wing | |
| 6th | 1952 | Jimmy Thomson | Defence | |
| 6th | 1952 | Harry Watson | Left wing | |
| 7th | 1953 | Sid Smith | Left wing | |
| 7th | 1953 | Jimmy Thomson | Defence | |
| 7th | 1953 | Harry Watson | Left wing | |
| 8th | 1954 | King Clancy | Coach | |
| 8th | 1954 | Tim Horton | Defence | |
| 8th | 1954 | Ted Kennedy | Centre | |
| 8th | 1954 | Harry Lumley | Goaltender | |
| 8th | 1954 | Sid Smith | Left wing | |
| 9th | 1955 | Harry Lumley | Goaltender | |
| 9th | 1955 | Jim Morrison | Defence | |
| 9th | 1955 | Sid Smith | Left wing | |
| 9th | 1955 | Ron Stewart | Right wing | |
| 10th | 1956 | George Armstrong | Right wing | |
| 10th | 1956 | Hugh Bolton | Defence | |
| 10th | 1956 | Dick Duff | Left wing | |
| 10th | 1956 | Jim Morrison | Defence | |
| 10th | 1956 | Tod Sloan | Centre | |
| 11th | 1957 | George Armstrong | Right wing | |
| 11th | 1957 | Dick Duff | Left wing | |
| 11th | 1957 | Rudy Migay | Centre | |
| 11th | 1957 | Jim Morrison | Defence | |
| 12th | 1958 | Dick Duff | Left wing | |
| 12th | 1958 | Billy Harris | Centre | |
| 13th | 1959 | George Armstrong | Right wing | |
| 13th | 1959 | Carl Brewer | Defence | |
| 13th | 1959 | Punch Imlach | Coach | |
| 13th | 1959 | Frank Mahovlich | Left wing | |
| 13th | 1959 | Bert Olmstead | Left wing | |
| 14th | 1960 | Punch Imlach | Coach | |
| 14th | 1960 | Red Kelly | Defence | |
| 14th | 1960 | Frank Mahovlich | Left wing | |
| 14th | 1960 | Bob Pulford | Left wing | |
| 14th | 1960 | Allan Stanley | Defence | |
| 15th | 1961 | Johnny Bower | Goaltender | |
| 15th | 1961 | Tim Horton | Defence | |
| 15th | 1961 | Frank Mahovlich | Left wing | |
| 16th | 1962 | George Armstrong | Right wing | |
| 16th | 1962 | Bobby Baun | Defence | |
| 16th | 1962 | Johnny Bower | Goaltender | |
| 16th | 1962 | Carl Brewer | Defence | |
| 16th | 1962 | Kent Douglas | Defence | |
| 16th | 1962 | Dick Duff | Left wing | |
| 16th | 1962 | Billy Harris | Centre | |
| 16th | 1962 | Larry Hillman | Defence | |
| 16th | 1962 | Tim Horton | Defence | |
| 16th | 1962 | Punch Imlach | Coach | |
| 16th | 1962 | Red Kelly | Centre | |
| 16th | 1962 | Dave Keon | Centre | |
| 16th | 1962 | Ed Litzenberger | Right wing | |
| 16th | 1962 | Frank Mahovlich | Left wing | |
| 16th | 1962 | John MacMillan | Right wing | |
| 16th | 1962 | Bob Nevin | Right wing | |
| 16th | 1962 | Bob Pulford | Left wing | |
| 16th | 1962 | Eddie Shack↑ | Right wing | |
| 16th | 1962 | Allan Stanley | Defence | |
| 16th | 1962 | Ron Stewart | Right wing | |
| 17th | 1963 | George Armstrong | Right wing | |
| 17th | 1963 | Bobby Baun | Defence | |
| 17th | 1963 | Johnny Bower | Goaltender | |
| 17th | 1963 | Kent Douglas | Defence | |
| 17th | 1963 | Dick Duff | Left wing | |
| 17th | 1963 | Billy Harris | Centre | |
| 17th | 1963 | Larry Hillman | Defence | |
| 17th | 1963 | Tim Horton | Defence | |
| 17th | 1963 | Punch Imlach | Coach | |
| 17th | 1963 | Red Kelly | Centre | |
| 17th | 1963 | Dave Keon | Centre | |
| 17th | 1963 | Ed Litzenberger | Right wing | |
| 17th | 1963 | Frank Mahovlich↑ | Left wing | |
| 17th | 1963 | John MacMillan | Right wing | |
| 17th | 1963 | Bob Nevin | Right wing | |
| 17th | 1963 | Bob Pulford | Left wing | |
| 17th | 1963 | Eddie Shack | Right wing | |
| 17th | 1963 | Don Simmons | Goaltender | |
| 17th | 1963 | Allan Stanley | Defence | |
| 17th | 1963 | Ron Stewart | Right wing | |
| 18th | 1964 | George Armstrong | Right wing | |
| 18th | 1964 | Andy Bathgate | Right wing | |
| 18th | 1964 | Bobby Baun | Defence | |
| 18th | 1964 | Johnny Bower | Goaltender | |
| 18th | 1964 | Carl Brewer | Defence | |
| 18th | 1964 | Kent Douglas | Defence | |
| 18th | 1964 | Gerry Ehman | Right wing | |
| 18th | 1964 | Ron Ellis | Right wing | |
| 18th | 1964 | Billy Harris | Centre | |
| 18th | 1964 | Larry Hillman | Defence | |
| 18th | 1964 | Tim Horton | Defence | |
| 18th | 1964 | Punch Imlach | Coach | |
| 18th | 1964 | Dave Keon | Centre | |
| 18th | 1964 | Frank Mahovlich | Left wing | |
| 18th | 1964 | Don McKenney | Centre | |
| 18th | 1964 | Jim Pappin | Right wing | |
| 18th | 1964 | Bob Pulford | Left wing | |
| 18th | 1964 | Terry Sawchuk | Goaltender | |
| 18th | 1964 | Eddie Shack | Right wing | |
| 18th | 1964 | Ron Stewart | Right wing | |
| 19th | 1965 | Bobby Baun | Defence | |
| 19th | 1965 | Ron Ellis | Right wing | |
| 19th | 1965 | Frank Mahovlich | Left wing | |
| 20th | 1967 | Dave Keon | Centre | |
| 20th | 1967 | Frank Mahovlich | Left wing | |
| 20th | 1967 | Allan Stanley | Defence | |
| 21st | 1968 | George Armstrong | Right wing | |
| 21st | 1968 | Wayne Carleton | Left wing | |
| 21st | 1968 | Brian Conacher | Left wing | |
| 21st | 1968 | Ron Ellis | Right wing | |
| 21st | 1968 | Bruce Gamble↑ | Goaltender | |
| 21st | 1968 | Larry Hillman | Defence | |
| 21st | 1968 | Tim Horton | Defence | |
| 21st | 1968 | Punch Imlach | Coach | |
| 21st | 1968 | Dave Keon | Centre | |
| 21st | 1968 | Frank Mahovlich | Left wing | |
| 21st | 1968 | Murray Oliver | Centre | |
| 21st | 1968 | Jim Pappin | Right wing | |
| 21st | 1968 | Marcel Pronovost | Defence | |
| 21st | 1968 | Bob Pulford | Left wing | |
| 21st | 1968 | Duane Rupp | Defence | |
| 21st | 1968 | Al Smith | Goaltender | |
| 21st | 1968 | Allan Stanley | Defence | |
| 21st | 1968 | Pete Stemkowski | Centre | |
| 21st | 1968 | Mike Walton | Centre | |
| 22nd | 1969 | Tim Horton | Defence | |
| 22nd | 1969 | Norm Ullman | Centre | |
| 23rd | 1970 | Ron Ellis | Right wing | |
| 23rd | 1970 | Dave Keon | Centre | |
| 24th | 1971 | Dave Keon | Centre | |
| 25th | 1972 | Paul Henderson | Left wing | |
| 26th | 1973 | Paul Henderson | Left wing | |
| 26th | 1973 | Dave Keon | Centre | |
| 27th | 1974 | Jim McKenny | Defence | |
| 27th | 1974 | Norm Ullman | Centre | |
| 28th | 1975 | Darryl Sittler | Centre | |
| 29th | 1976 | Borje Salming | Defence | |
| 29th | 1976 | Wayne Thomas | Goaltender | |
| 30th | 1977 | Lanny McDonald | Right wing | |
| 30th | 1977 | Borje Salming | Defence | |
| 30th | 1977 | Ian Turnbull | Defence | |
| 31st | 1978 | Lanny McDonald | Right wing | |
| 31st | 1978 | Borje Salming | Defence | |
| 31st | 1978 | Darryl Sittler | Centre | |
| 32nd | 1980 | Dave Burrows | Defence | |
| 32nd | 1980 | Darryl Sittler | Centre | |
| 33rd | 1981 | Robert Picard | Defence | |
| 34th | 1982 | Bob Manno | Defence | |
| 34th | 1982 | Rick Vaive | Right wing | |
| 35th | 1983 | Rick Vaive | Right wing | |
| 36th | 1984 | Rick Vaive | Right wing | |
| 37th | 1985 | Miroslav Frycer | Right wing | |
| 38th | 1986 | Wendel Clark | Left wing | |
| 39th | 1988 | Al Iafrate | Defence | |
| 40th | 1989 | Gary Leeman | Right wing | |
| 41st | 1990 | Al Iafrate | Defence | |
| 42nd | 1991 | Vincent Damphousse↑ | Left wing | |
| 43rd | 1992 | David Ellett | Defence | |
| 44th | 1993 | Doug Gilmour | Centre | |
| 45th | 1994 | Dave Andreychuk | Left wing | |
| 45th | 1994 | Wendel Clark (Did not play) | Left wing | |
| 45th | 1994 | Doug Gilmour | Centre | |
| 45th | 1994 | Felix Potvin† | Goaltender | |
| 46th | 1996 | Mike Gartner | Right wing | |
| 46th | 1996 | Larry Murphy | Defence | |
| 46th | 1996 | Felix Potvin | Goaltender | |
| 46th | 1996 | Mats Sundin | Centre | |
| 47th | 1997 | Mats Sundin | Centre | |
| 48th | 1998 | Mats Sundin | Centre | |
| 49th | 1999 | Curtis Joseph (Did not play) | Goaltender | |
| 49th | 1999 | Mats Sundin | Centre | |
| 50th | 2000 | Curtis Joseph† | Goaltender | |
| 50th | 2000 | Pat Quinn | Coach | |
| 50th | 2000 | Mats Sundin† | Centre | |
| 50th | 2000 | Dmitri Yushkevich | Defence | |
| 51st | 2001 | Mats Sundin | Centre | |
| 52nd | 2002 | Tomas Kaberle | Defence | |
| 52nd | 2002 | Pat Quinn | Coach | |
| 52nd | 2002 | Mats Sundin | Centre | |
| 53rd | 2003 | Ed Belfour (Did not play) | Goaltender | |
| 53rd | 2003 | Mats Sundin (Did not play) | Centre | |
| 54th | 2004 | Pat Quinn | Coach | |
| 54th | 2004 | Gary Roberts | Left wing | |
| 54th | 2004 | Mats Sundin | Centre | |
| 55th | 2007 | Tomas Kaberle | Defence | |
| 56th | 2008 | Tomas Kaberle | Defence | |
| 57th | 2009 | Tomas Kaberle | Defence | |
| 58th | 2011 | Phil Kessel | Right wing | |
| 59th | 2012 | Phil Kessel | Right wing | |
| 59th | 2012 | Joffrey Lupul | Right wing | |
| 59th | 2012 | Dion Phaneuf† | Defence | |
| 60th | 2015 | Phil Kessel | Right wing | |
| 61st | 2016 | Leo Komarov | Centre | |
| 62nd | 2017 | Auston Matthews | Centre | |
| 63rd | 2018 | Auston Matthews | Centre | |
| 64th | 2019 | Auston Matthews† | Centre | |
| 64th | 2019 | John Tavares | Centre | |
| 65th | 2020 | Frederik Andersen | Goaltender | |
| 65th | 2020 | Mitch Marner# | Right wing | |
| 65th | 2020 | Auston Matthews (Did not play) | Centre | |
| 66th | 2022 | Jack Campbell | Goaltender | |
| 66th | 2022 | Auston Matthews† | Centre | |
| 67th | 2023 | Mitch Marner | Right wing | |
| 67th | 2023 | Auston Matthews†(Did not play) | Centre | |
| 68th | 2024 | Mitch Marner† | Right wing | |
| 68th | 2024 | Auston Matthews↑ | Centre | |
| 68th | 2024 | William Nylander† | Centre | |
| 68th | 2024 | Morgan Rielly† | Defence | |

=== All-Star benefit games ===
Prior to the institution of the National Hockey League All-Star Game the league held three different benefit games featuring teams of all-stars. The first was the Ace Bailey Benefit Game, held in 1934, after a violent collision with Eddie Shore of the Boston Bruins left Toronto's Ace Bailey hospitalized and unable to continue his playing career. In 1937 the Howie Morenz Memorial Game was held to raise money for the family of Howie Morenz of the Montreal Canadiens who died from complications after being admitted to the hospital for a broken leg. The Babe Siebert Memorial Game was held in 1939 to raise funds for the family of the Canadiens' Babe Siebert who drowned shortly after he retired from playing.

Toronto Maple Leafs players and coaches selected to All-Star benefit games
| Game | Year | Name | Position | References |
|---|---|---|---|---|
| Ace Bailey Benefit Game | 1934 | Andy Blair | Centre | |
| Ace Bailey Benefit Game | 1934 | Buzz Boll | Left wing | |
| Ace Bailey Benefit Game | 1934 | King Clancy | Defence | |
| Ace Bailey Benefit Game | 1934 | Charlie Conacher | Right wing | |
| Ace Bailey Benefit Game | 1934 | Harold Cotton | Left wing | |
| Ace Bailey Benefit Game | 1934 | Hap Day | Left wing | |
| Ace Bailey Benefit Game | 1934 | Ken Doraty | Right wing | |
| Ace Bailey Benefit Game | 1934 | George Hainsworth | Goaltender | |
| Ace Bailey Benefit Game | 1934 | Red Horner | Defence | |
| Ace Bailey Benefit Game | 1934 | Dick Irvin | Coach | |
| Ace Bailey Benefit Game | 1934 | Busher Jackson | Left wing | |
| Ace Bailey Benefit Game | 1934 | Hec Kilrea | Left wing | |
| Ace Bailey Benefit Game | 1934 | Alex Levinsky | Defence | |
| Ace Bailey Benefit Game | 1934 | Joe Primeau | Centre | |
| Ace Bailey Benefit Game | 1934 | Charlie Sands | Right wing | |
| Ace Bailey Benefit Game | 1934 | Bill Thoms | Centre | |
| Howie Morenz Memorial Game | 1937 | Charlie Conacher | Right wing | |
| Howie Morenz Memorial Game | 1937 | Red Horner | Defence | |
| Howie Morenz Memorial Game | 1937 | Busher Jackson | Left wing | |
| Babe Siebert Memorial Game | 1939 | Syl Apps | Centre | |
| Babe Siebert Memorial Game | 1939 | Gordie Drillon | Defence | |

=== All-Star Game replacement events ===
Toronto Maple Leafs players and coaches selected to All-Star Game replacement events
| Event | Year | Name | Position | References |
|---|---|---|---|---|
| Challenge Cup | 1979 | Lanny McDonald | Right wing | |
| Challenge Cup | 1979 | Borje Salming | Defence | |
| Challenge Cup | 1979 | Darryl Sittler | Centre | |
| Rendez-vous '87 | 1987 | No Maple Leafs selected | — | |
| 4 Nations Face-Off | 2025 | Jani Hakanpää (Finland) | Defence | |
| 4 Nations Face-Off | 2025 | Mitch Marner (Canada) | Right wing | |
| 4 Nations Face-Off | 2025 | Auston Matthews (United States) | Centre | |
| 4 Nations Face-Off | 2025 | William Nylander (Sweden) | Right wing | |

== Career achievements ==
=== Hockey Hall of Fame ===
The following persons have been inducted into the Hockey Hall of Fame. The list includes anyone who played for the Toronto NHL franchise (which includes the Arenas and St. Pats) who was later inducted as a player. The list of builders includes anyone inducted as a builder who spent any part of their career in a coaching, management, or ownership role with Toronto. As of 2017, 62 players have been inducted, more than any other franchise.

† Played for the Toronto Arenas or Toronto St. Pats.

Toronto Maple Leafs inducted into the Hockey Hall of Fame
| Individual | Category | Year inducted | Years with Toronto in category | References |
|---|---|---|---|---|
| Jack Adams | Player | 1959 | 1922–1926 | |
| Glenn Anderson | Player | 2008 | 1991–1994 | |
| Dave Andreychuk | Player | 2017 | 1993–1996 | |
| Syl Apps | Player | 1961 | 1936–1948 | |
| George Armstrong | Player | 1975 | 1950–1971 | |
| Ace Bailey | Player | 1975 | 1926–1933 | |
| Harold Ballard | Builder | 1977 | 1957–1989 | |
| Tom Barrasso | Player | 2023 | 2002 | |
| Andy Bathgate | Player | 1978 | 1963–1965 | |
| Ed Belfour | Player | 2011 | 2002–2006 | |
| Max Bentley | Player | 1966 | 1947–1953 | |
| J. P. Bickell | Builder | 1978 | 1919–1951 | |
| Leo Boivin | Player | 1986 | 1951–1955 | |
| Johnny Bower | Player | 1976 | 1958–1970 | |
| Turk Broda | Player | 1967 | 1936–1952 | |
| Brian Burke | Builder | 2026 | 2008–2013 | |
| Pat Burns | Builder | 2014 | 1992–1996 | |
| Harry Cameron† | Player | 1962 | 1917–1923 | |
| Gerry Cheevers | Player | 1985 | 1961–1962 | |
| King Clancy | Player | 1958 | 1930–1936 | |
| Sprague Cleghorn | Player | 1958 | 1920–1921 | |
| Charlie Conacher | Player | 1961 | 1929–1937 | |
| Rusty Crawford† | Player | 1962 | 1917–1919 | |
| Hap Day | Player | 1961 | 1924–1937 | |
| Gordie Drillon | Player | 1975 | 1937–1942 | |
| Dick Duff | Player | 2006 | 1954–1964 | |
| Babe Dye | Player | 1970 | 1920–1926, 1930 | |
| Fernie Flaman | Player | 1990 | 1950–1954 | |
| Cliff Fletcher | Builder | 2004 | 1991–1997 | |
| Ron Francis | Player | 2007 | 2003–2004 | |
| Grant Fuhr | Player | 2003 | 1991–1993 | |
| Mike Gartner | Player | 2001 | 1994–1996 | |
| Eddie Gerard† | Player | 1945 | 1921–1922 | |
| Doug Gilmour | Player | 2011 | 1991–1997, 2003 | |
| Jim Gregory | Builder | 2007 | 1969–1979 | |
| George Hainsworth | Player | 1961 | 1933–1937 | |
| Foster Hewitt | Builder | 1965 | 1927–1963 | |
| W. A. Hewitt | Builder | 1947 | | |
| Hap Holmes† | Player | 1972 | 1917–1919 | |
| Red Horner | Player | 1965 | 1928–1940 | |
| Tim Horton | Player | 1977 | 1952–1970 | |
| Phil Housley | Player | 2015 | 2003 | |
| Syd Howe | Player | 1965 | 1931–1932 | |
| Punch Imlach | Builder | 1984 | 1958–1969, 1979–1980 | |
| Busher Jackson | Player | 1971 | 1929–1939 | |
| Red Kelly | Player | 1969 | 1960–1967 | |
| Ted Kennedy | Player | 1966 | 1943–1957 | |
| Dave Keon | Player | 1986 | 1960–1975 | |
| Lou Lamoriello | Builder | 2009 | 2015–2018 | |
| Brian Leetch | Player | 2009 | 2004 | |
| Eric Lindros | Player | 2016 | 2005–2006 | |
| Harry Lumley | Player | 1980 | 1952–1956 | |
| Frank Mahovlich | Player | 1981 | 1957–1968 | |
| Lanny McDonald | Player | 1992 | 1973–1979 | |
| Alexander Mogilny | Player | 2025 | 2001-2004 | |
| Dickie Moore | Player | 1974 | 1964–1965 | |
| Larry Murphy | Player | 2004 | 1995–1997 | |
| Roger Neilson | Builder | 2002 | 1977–1979 | |
| Joe Nieuwendyk | Player | 2011 | 2003–2004 | |
| Frank Nighbor | Player | 1947 | 1929–1930 | |
| Reg Noble† | Player | 1962 | 1919–1924 | |
| Bert Olmstead | Player | 1985 | 1958–1962 | |
| Bernie Parent | Player | 1984 | 1970–1972 | |
| Pierre Pilote | Player | 1975 | 1968–1969 | |
| Jacques Plante | Player | 1978 | 1970–1973 | |
| Babe Pratt | Player | 1966 | 1942–1946 | |
| Joe Primeau | Player | 1963 | 1927–1936 | |
| Marcel Pronovost | Player | 1978 | 1965–1970 | |
| Bob Pulford | Player | 1991 | 1956–1970 | |
| Pat Quinn | Builder | 2016 | 1999–2006 | |
| Borje Salming | Player | 1996 | 1973–1989 | |
| Terry Sawchuk | Player | 1971 | 1964–1967 | |
| Sweeney Schriner | Player | 1962 | 1939–1946 | |
| Frank J. Selke | Builder | 1960 | 1929–1946 | |
| Darryl Sittler | Player | 1989 | 1970–1982 | |
| Conn Smythe | Builder | 1958 | 1927–1966 | |
| Allan Stanley | Player | 1981 | 1958–1968 | |
| Mats Sundin | Player | 2012 | 1994–2008 | |
| Joe Thornton | Player | 2025 | 2021 | |
| Norm Ullman | Player | 1982 | 1968–1975 | |
| Harry Watson | Player | 1994 | 1946–1955 | |

=== Foster Hewitt Memorial Award ===
Four members of the Maple Leafs organization have been honored with the Foster Hewitt Memorial Award. The award is presented by the Hockey Hall of Fame to members of the radio and television industry who make outstanding contributions to their profession and the game of ice hockey during their broadcasting career.

Members of the Toronto Maple Leafs honored with the Foster Hewitt Memorial Award
| Individual | Year honored | Years with Maple Leafs as broadcaster | References |
|---|---|---|---|
| Joe Bowen | 2018 | 1982–2026 | |
| Chris Cuthbert | 2026 | 2014–present | |
| Bill Hewitt | 2007 | 1958–1981 | |
| Foster Hewitt | 1984 | 1927–1963 | |
| Jim Hughson | 2019 | 1982–1986 | |
| Wes McKnight | 1986 | | |
| Harry Neale | 2013 | 1986–2007, 2013–2014 | |
| Mickey Redmond | 2011 | 1982–1986 | |

=== Retired numbers ===
The Leafs had a policy of retiring numbers only for players "who have made a significant contribution to the Toronto Maple Leaf Hockey Club and have experienced a career-ending incident while a member of the Maple Leaf team", although this policy was changed for the Leafs centennial season, when they announced the retirement of 11 additional numbers belonging to 17 different players. Barilko (who died in a plane crash during his playing career) and Bailey (whose career ended with a severe head injury) met the criteria prior to the team's centennial season. Ron Ellis received permission from Bailey, by the time of his career the Leafs' Director of Scouting, to wear number 6. Also out of circulation is the number 99 which was retired league-wide for Wayne Gretzky on February 6, 2000. Gretzky did not play for the Maple Leafs during his 20-year NHL career and the only Maple Leaf to wear the number prior to its retirement was Wilf Paiement during his three seasons with the team in the early 1980s.

Toronto Maple Leafs retired numbers
| Number | Player | Position | Years with Maple Leafs as a player | Date of retirement ceremony | References |
|---|---|---|---|---|---|
| 1 | Johnny Bower | Goaltender | 1959–1970 | October 15, 2016 | |
| 1 | Turk Broda | Goaltender | 1937–1952 | October 15, 2016 | |
| 4 | Hap Day | Defence | 1924–1937 | October 15, 2016 | |
| 4 | Red Kelly | Centre | 1961–1967 | October 15, 2016 | |
| 5 | Bill Barilko | Defence | 1947–1951 | October 17, 1992 | |
| 6 | Ace Bailey | Right wing | 1926–1933 | February 13, 1934 | |
| 7 | King Clancy | Defence | 1931–1937 | October 15, 2016 | |
| 7 | Tim Horton | Defence | 1950–1970 | October 15, 2016 | |
| 9 | Charlie Conacher | Right wing | 1930–1938 | October 15, 2016 | |
| 9 | Ted Kennedy | Centre | 1943–1955, 1956–1957 | October 15, 2016 | |
| 10 | Syl Apps | Centre | 1937–1943, 1945–1948 | October 15, 2016 | |
| 10 | George Armstrong | Right wing | 1950–1971 | October 15, 2016 | |
| 13 | Mats Sundin | Centre | 1994–2008 | October 15, 2016 | |
| 14 | Dave Keon | Centre | 1960–1975 | October 15, 2016 | |
| 17 | Wendel Clark | Left wing | 1985–1994, 1996–1998, 1999–2000 | October 15, 2016 | |
| 21 | Borje Salming | Defence | 1973–1989 | October 15, 2016 | |
| 27 | Frank Mahovlich | Left wing | 1957–1968 | October 15, 2016 | |
| 27 | Darryl Sittler | Centre | 1970–1982 | October 15, 2016 | |
| 93 | Doug Gilmour | Centre | 1991–1997, 2002–2003 | October 15, 2016 | |

== Team awards ==
=== Molson Cup ===
The Molson Cup is an award given to the player who earns the most points from three-star selections during the regular season.

| Season | Winner |
|---|---|
| 1973–74 | Borje Salming |
| 1974–75 | Darryl Sittler |
| 1975–76 | Darryl Sittler |
| 1976–77 | Borje Salming |
| 1977–78 | Borje Salming |
| 1978–79 | Darryl Sittler |
| 1979–80 | Borje Salming |
| 1980–81 | Darryl Sittler |
| 1980–81 | Wilf Paiement |
| 1981–82 | Michel Larocque |
| 1982–83 | Rick Vaive |
| 1983–84 | Rick Vaive |
| 1984–85 | Bill Derlago |
| 1985–86 | Ken Wregget |
| 1986–87 | Rick Vaive |

| Season | Winner |
|---|---|
| 1987–88 | Ken Wregget |
| 1988–89 | Gary Leeman |
| 1989–90 | Gary Leeman |
| 1990–91 | Peter Ing |
| 1991–92 | Grant Fuhr |
| 1992–93 | Doug Gilmour |
| 1993–94 | Doug Gilmour |
| 1994–95 | Mats Sundin |
| 1995–96 | Felix Potvin |
| 1996–97 | Felix Potvin |
| 1997–98 | Felix Potvin |
| 1998–99 | Curtis Joseph |
| 1999–00 | Curtis Joseph |
| 2000–01 | Curtis Joseph |
| 2001–02 | Mats Sundin |

| Season | Winner |
|---|---|
| 2002–03 | Ed Belfour |
| 2003–04 | Ed Belfour |
| 2005–06 | Mats Sundin |
| 2006–07 | Mats Sundin |
| 2007–08 | Vesa Toskala |
| 2008–09 | Vesa Toskala |
| 2009–10 | Phil Kessel |
| 2010–11 | Phil Kessel |
| 2011–12 | Phil Kessel |
| 2012–13 | James Reimer |
| 2013–14 | Jonathan Bernier |
| 2014–15 | Jonathan Bernier |
| 2015–16 | Jonathan Bernier |
| 2016–17 | Frederik Andersen |
| 2017–18 | Frederik Andersen |

== Other awards ==
Toronto Maple Leafs who have received non-NHL awards
| Award | Description | Winner | Year | References |
|---|---|---|---|---|
| Charlie Conacher Humanitarian Award | For humanitarian or community service projects | George Armstrong | 1968–69 | |
| Charlie Conacher Humanitarian Award | For humanitarian or community service projects | Borje Salming | 1981–82 | |
| Lionel Conacher Award | Canada's male athlete of the year | Syl Apps | 1937 | |
| Viking Award | Most valuable Swedish player in NHL | Borje Salming | 1975–76 | |
| Viking Award | Most valuable Swedish player in NHL | Borje Salming | 1976–77 | |
| Viking Award | Most valuable Swedish player in NHL | Borje Salming | 1978–79 | |
| Viking Award | Most valuable Swedish player in NHL | Mats Sundin | 1996–97 | |
| Viking Award | Most valuable Swedish player in NHL | Mats Sundin | 2001–02 | |

== See also ==
- List of National Hockey League awards
