= Edgar Laprade =

Canadian ice hockey player (1919–2014)

- Hockey Hall of Fame, 1993
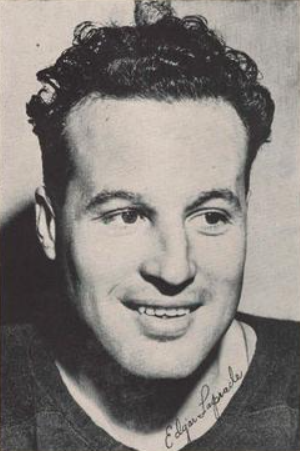
- Born: October 10, 1919 Mine Centre, Ontario, Canada
- Died: April 28, 2014 (aged 94) Thunder Bay, Ontario, Canada
- Height: 5 ft 8 in (173 cm)
- Weight: 160 lb (73 kg; 11 st 6 lb)
- Position: Centre
- Shot: Right
- Played for: New York Rangers
- Playing career: 1945–1955

Edgar Louis "Beaver" Laprade (October 10, 1919 – April 28, 2014) was a Canadian professional ice hockey centre who played for the New York Rangers in the National Hockey League. The son of Thomas and Edith Laprade, he was born in the New Ontario community of Mine Centre. By age 4, he and his family moved to Port Arthur, Ontario. He also spent time with the Port Arthur Bearcats of the Thunder Bay Senior Hockey League.

== Playing career ==
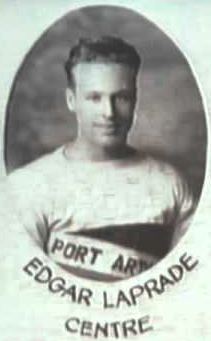
Laprade pictured on the 1939 Port Arthur Bearcats composite photo

Laprade started his hockey career with the Port Arthur Juniors where as a centre player he immediately drew praise in March 1936 from the sports editor of the Port Arthur News-Chronicle who compared him to Newsy Lalonde. "In his appearance, in every movement, in style, skating, handling of the puck and generalship as he carries in on the goal, to loose his own shot or make plays for his team mates, never in a hurry, never excited but always showing generalship and judgment, Laprade is the incarnate Newsy." "Possessor of an uncanny shift that rarely failed to baffle the opposition, the unassuming little second-string pivot had his deft finger in all three of the Junior's tallies." He then moved up to the Port Arthur Bruins in the Thunder Bay Junior A Hockey League. In 1938–39, Laprade joined the Port Arthur Bearcats in the Thunder Bay Senior Hockey League (TBSHL). Laprade scored many times, and he was selected as the MVP of the TBSHL in 1938-39 and 1940–41. He also helped the team win the Allan Cup in 1939–40.

After the 1942–43 season, Laprade joined the army. While in the army, he still played hockey regularly with the Winnipeg Army. In 1944–45, he played one season with the Barriefield Bears before moving on to the National Hockey League with the New York Rangers. In his first season of NHL hockey, Laprade recorded 34 points in 49 games. His effort impressed the league and he was awarded the Calder Memorial Trophy. Laprade finished the 1946-47 NHL season with 40 points, and earned a spot in the first NHL All-Star Game. He also played in the 1948, 1949, and 1950 NHL All-Star Games.

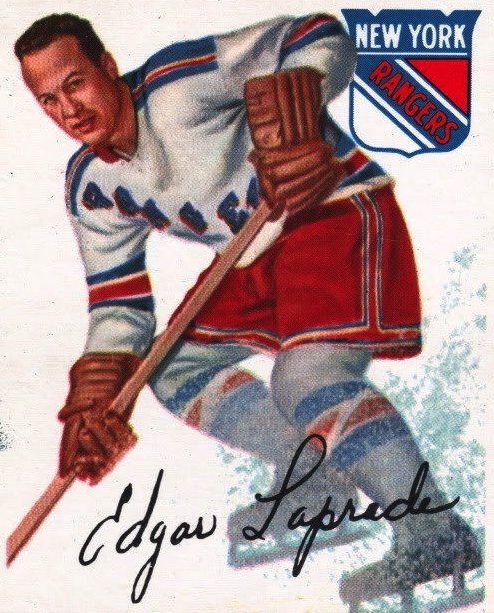
Laprade 1954 Topps card

During his career, Laprade played three full seasons without recording a penalty, and was awarded the Lady Byng Memorial Trophy in 1949-50. In the same season, the Rangers made it all the way to the Stanley Cup Final against the Detroit Red Wings, the closest Laprade ever came to winning a Stanley Cup. The series went all the way to a game seven before Pete Babando of the Detroit Red Wings scored the game-winning goal in overtime. After that, Laprade played five more seasons with the Rangers before retiring. He was inducted into the Hockey Hall of Fame in 1993.

== Life after hockey ==
In 1939, he married Arline Whear, his coach's niece. The couple had three daughters.

After retiring from hockey, Laprade went into a partnership with Guy Perciante in operating a sporting goods store, Perciante & Laprade Sporting Goods Limited, in Thunder Bay, Ontario for 30 years. Perciante and Laprade also owned and managed an arena in Port Arthur.

He served as a member of Port Arthur and then Thunder Bay city council from 1959 to 1970 and again from 1972 to 1973. He also served on the board of governors for Confederation College and Lakehead University.

Laprade died at home in Thunder Bay at the age of 94 on April 28, 2014.

== Awards and achievements ==
- Selected as TBSHL MVP in 1939, and 1941.
- Allan Cup champion in 1939.
- Calder Memorial Trophy winner in 1946.
- Played in 1947, 1948, 1949, and 1950 NHL All-Star Games.
- Lady Byng Memorial Trophy winner in 1950.
- Inducted into the Northwestern Ontario Sports Hall of Fame in 1982.
- Inducted into the Hockey Hall of Fame in 1993.
- In the 2009 book 100 Ranger Greats, was ranked No. 24 all-time of the 901 New York Rangers who had played during the team's first 82 seasons

== Career statistics ==
			Regular season					Playoffs
Season	Team	League	GP	G	A	Pts	PIM	GP	G	A	Pts	PIM
1935–36	Port Arthur Bruins	TBJHL	14	13	10	23	6	4	4	2	6	2
1936–37	Port Arthur Bruins	TBJHL	18	19	14	33	2	3	6	3	9	5
1937–38	Port Arthur Bruins	TBJHL	18	23	11	34	9	5	6	0	6	0
1938–39	Port Arthur Bruins	TBJHL	10	7	4	11	—	—	—	—	—	—
1938–39	Port Arthur Bearcats	TBSHL	25	31	9	40	7	6	3	3	6	4
1938–39	Port Arthur Bearcats	Al-Cup	—	—	—	—	—	13	22	4	26	6
1939–40	Port Arthur Bearcats	TBSHL	22	20	15	35	8	3	5	1	6	2
1939–40	Port Arthur Bearcats	Al-Cup	—	—	—	—	—	12	13	10	23	6
1940–41	Port Arthur Bearcats	TBSHL	20	26	21	47	7	4	2	1	3	0
1941–42	Port Arthur Bearcats	TBSHL	15	18	23	41	4	—	—	—	—	—
1941–42	Port Arthur Bearcats	Al-Cup	—	—	—	—	—	17	12	21	33	6
1942–43	Port Arthur Bearcats	TBSHL	8	7	10	17	0	3	7	4	11	4
1942–43	Port Arthur Bearcats	Al-Cup	—	—	—	—	—	8	6	10	16	2
1943–44	Winnipeg Army	WNDHL	6	10	3	13	0	—	—	—	—	—
1944–45	Barriefield Bears	KCHL	—	19	28	47	2	4	5	8	13	0
1945–46	New York Rangers	NHL	49	15	19	34	0	—	—	—	—	—
1946–47	New York Rangers	NHL	58	15	25	40	9	—	—	—	—	—
1947–48	New York Rangers	NHL	59	13	34	47	7	6	1	4	5	0
1948–49	New York Rangers	NHL	56	18	12	30	12	—	—	—	—	—
1949–50	New York Rangers	NHL	60	22	22	44	2	12	3	5	8	4
1950–51	New York Rangers	NHL	42	10	13	23	0	—	—	—	—	—
1951–52	New York Rangers	NHL	70	9	29	38	8	—	—	—	—	—
1952–53	New York Rangers	NHL	11	2	1	3	2	—	—	—	—	—
1953–54	New York Rangers	NHL	35	1	6	7	2	—	—	—	—	—
1954–55	New York Rangers	NHL	60	3	11	14	0	—	—	—	—	—
TBSHL totals			90	102	78	180	26	16	17	9	26	10
Al-Cup totals			—	—	—	—	—	50	53	45	98	20
NHL totals			500	108	172	280	42	18	4	9	13	4

Preceded by Frank McCool	Winner of the Calder Memorial Trophy; 1946	Succeeded by Howie Meeker
Preceded by Bill Quackenbush	Winner of the Lady Byng Trophy; 1950	Succeeded by Red Kelly
