= Jimmy Thomson (ice hockey, born 1927) =

Canadian ice hockey player

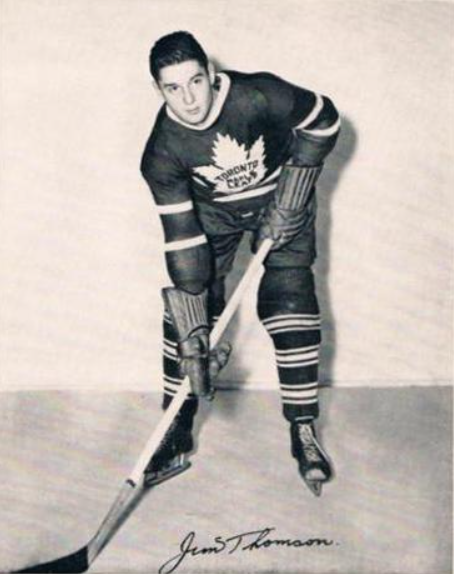
- Born: February 23, 1927 Winnipeg, Manitoba, Canada
- Died: May 18, 1991 (aged 64) Toronto, Ontario, Canada
- Height: 5 ft 11 in (180 cm)
- Weight: 175 lb (79 kg; 12 st 7 lb)
- Position: Defence
- Shot: Right
- Played for: Toronto Maple Leafs; Chicago Black Hawks
- Playing career: 1945–1958

James Richard Thomson (February 23, 1927 – May 18, 1991) was a Canadian professional ice hockey player. Thomson played nearly 800 games in the National Hockey League (NHL) from 1945 to 1958 with the Toronto Maple Leafs and Chicago Black Hawks. Thomson was a member of four Stanley Cup championship teams with Toronto and also served as captain of the team. After helping to organize a players' association for the NHL players, Thomson earned the ire of Toronto Maple Leafs' owner Conn Smythe, after which Thomson vowed to never play again for the Maple Leafs. He was traded to Chicago in the off-season and he played one season in Chicago to finish his career; he subsequently became involved in business ventures. Thomson still holds the NHL record for the most assists in a season without a goal, having recorded 29 assists in the 1947–48 season.

== Playing career ==
Born in Winnipeg, Thomson was signed by the Toronto Maple Leafs and headed to Toronto at the age of 16 to play junior hockey with the St. Michael's Majors, a Leafs affiliate in the Ontario Hockey Association. After two seasons at St. Mike's, he spent most of the 1945–46 season with the Pittsburgh Hornets in the American Hockey League before joining the Maple Leafs on a full-time basis the next year. He won the Stanley Cup with Toronto in 1947, 1948, 1949 and 1951. He and teammate Gus Mortson were known in Toronto as the "Gold Dust Twins".

At the beginning of the 1956–57 season, Thomson was named team captain, succeeding veteran Sid Smith who gave up the title after his offensive production plummeted during his one season as captain of the previous year. Thomson's time with the C would be brief, as it was handed back to former captain Ted Kennedy when he made a comeback after retiring at the end of the 1954–55 season.

That same season, Thomson became one of the leaders of Ted Lindsay's attempt to have a players' association formed, hoping to improve players' conditions and especially to improve player pensions. Thomson was secretary-treasurer of the association and led the organizational drive within the Maple Leafs, which resulted in every member of the team except Kennedy wanting to join the association. Thomson's activities didn't go over well with Maple Leafs' president Conn Smythe, who called him disloyal, revealed his salary dating back to junior, and took him off the team during the season. At the end of the season, Thomson announced to the press that he had played his last game for Smythe and would never play hockey for Toronto ever again. During the off-season, he was sold to the Chicago Black Hawks after twelve years with the Maple Leafs. Lindsay was also traded to Chicago at the same time.

Thomson played one season in Chicago and retired in 1958 at age 31. He accepted work at his father-in-law's coal and oil company while playing for the Maple Leafs and went into the business full-time following his playing career. Thomson died of a heart attack in 1991.

== Awards and achievements ==
- Memorial Cup championship (1945)
- NHL Second All-Star team (1951 and 1952)
- Played in NHL All-Star Game (1947, 1948, 1949, 1950, 1951, 1952 and 1953)
- Stanley Cup championships (1947, 1948, 1949 and 1951)
- "Honoured Member" of the Manitoba Hockey Hall of Fame

== Career statistics ==
			Regular season					Playoffs
Season	Team	League	GP	G	A	Pts	PIM	GP	G	A	Pts	PIM
1943–44	Toronto St. Michael's Majors	OHA-Jr.	21	2	2	4	40	12	2	2	4	20
1943–44	Trail Smoke Eaters	M-Cup	—	—	—	—	—	1	0	0	0	0
1944–45	Toronto St. Michael's Majors	OHA-Jr.	18	13	12	25	52	9	5	2	7	14
1944–45	Toronto St. Michael's Majors	M-Cup	—	—	—	—	—	14	6	4	10	30
1945–46	Toronto Maple Leafs	NHL	5	0	1	1	4	—	—	—	—	—
1945–46	Pittsburgh Hornets	AHL	28	2	5	7	16	6	0	2	2	2
1946–47	Toronto Maple Leafs	NHL	60	2	14	16	97	11	0	1	1	22
1947–48	Toronto Maple Leafs	NHL	59	0	29	29	82	9	1	1	2	9
1948–49	Toronto Maple Leafs	NHL	60	4	16	20	56	9	1	5	6	10
1949–50	Toronto Maple Leafs	NHL	70	0	13	13	76	7	0	2	2	7
1950–51	Toronto Maple Leafs	NHL	69	3	33	36	76	11	0	1	1	34
1951–52	Toronto Maple Leafs	NHL	70	0	25	25	86	4	0	0	0	25
1952–53	Toronto Maple Leafs	NHL	69	0	22	22	73	—	—	—	—	—
1953–54	Toronto Maple Leafs	NHL	61	2	24	26	86	3	0	0	0	2
1954–55	Toronto Maple Leafs	NHL	70	4	12	16	63	4	0	0	0	16
1955–56	Toronto Maple Leafs	NHL	62	0	7	7	96	5	0	3	3	10
1956–57	Toronto Maple Leafs	NHL	62	0	12	12	50	—	—	—	—	—
1957–58	Chicago Black Hawks	NHL	70	4	7	11	75	—	—	—	—	—
NHL totals			787	19	215	234	920	63	2	13	15	135

Preceded by Sid Smith	Toronto Maple Leafs captain 1956–57	Succeeded by Ted Kennedy
