= NHL All-Star Game =

North American exhibition ice hockey games

National Hockey League All-Star Game
- Status: Active
- Genre: Sports event
- Date: January or February
- Frequency: Annual
- Location: Various
- Inaugurated: October 13, 1947
- Previous event: 2024 NHL All-Star Game
- Next event: 2027 NHL All-Star Game
- Organizer: NHL

The National Hockey League All-Star Game (French: Match des étoiles de la Ligue nationale de hockey) is an exhibition ice hockey tournament that is traditionally held during the regular season of the National Hockey League (NHL), with many of the League's star players playing against each other. The games' proceeds benefit the pension fund of the players, and the winning team is awarded $1,000,000 towards a charity of their choice.

The NHL All-Star Game, held in late January or early February, marks the symbolic halfway point in the regular season, though not the mathematical halfway point which, for most seasons, is usually one or two weeks earlier. Between 2007 and 2020, it was held in late January. It was skipped in 2021 because of the COVID-19 pandemic, the 2022 to 2024 editions were held on the first Saturday of February. The 2026 All-Star Game was skipped in favor of allowing players to focus on participating in the 2026 Winter Olympics.

== Formats ==
From 1947 to 1968, the All-Star Game primarily saw the previous season's Stanley Cup champions take on a team of All-Stars from the other clubs. There were two exceptions during this period: The 1951 and 1952 games instead featured two teams of All-Star players, one consisting of players on American-based teams and the other with players on Canadian-based teams.

Beginning in 1969, the format was geographic with the Wales/Eastern Conference All-Stars playing the Campbell/Western Conference All-Stars, with the "first team", or starting line, including the starting goaltender, voted in by fans, while the remainder of the teams' rosters are chosen by the NHL's Hockey Operations Department in consultation with the teams' general managers. Since 1996, the head coaches for the two All-Star teams have been the coaches of the two teams that are leading their respective conferences in point percentage (i.e. fraction of points obtained out of total possible points). Previously, the two head coaches that appeared in the previous year's Stanley Cup Finals coached the All-Star teams.

The 1998 All-Star Game was held in the same year as the 1998 Winter Olympics, allowing the NHL to show off its players from all over the world. For this event, the NHL had the All-Star teams consist of a team of North Americans playing against a team of stars from the rest of the world. The North America vs. World All-Star format lasted through the 2002 Game, the same year as the 2002 Winter Olympics, before reverting to the Eastern vs. Western Conference format in 2003.

During the 2010–11 season, the NHL announced a change to the way the teams were selected, modeled after drafts in fantasy sports. The conference vs. conference (i.e. East vs. West) approach was replaced by a player draft conducted by the All-Star players themselves to determine the rosters for each team. The captains for each team now select players from a combined pool of both fan balloting and the NHL Hockey Operations Department. The change in format was a joint effort by the League and the National Hockey League Players' Association (NHLPA). This format lasted through the 2015 game.

On November 18, 2015, the NHL announced significant changes to the All-Star Game format, starting with the 2016 game: instead of one game featuring two teams, there are four All-Star teams based on the league's four divisions, competing in a single-elimination tournament. The format of all three games in the tournament is three-on-three, with 10-minute halves each. If a tie remains after 20 minutes, then it directly goes to a three-round shootout plus extra rounds as needed to determine the winner; there is no standard overtime. The winners of the two semifinal games then meet in an All-Star Game Final. In 2017, the format was slightly changed: the division that wins the NHL All-Star Skills Competition during the previous night then gets to pick which team they will play first in the semifinals.

On November 27, 2023, the NHL announced that it would be combining the four-team, three-on-three format with the fantasy draft used in the previous system. The league selected the captains for each of the four teams from a combined pool of both fan balloting and the NHL Hockey Operations Department, and the players then conducted a draft to determine the rosters for each team.

On June 3, 2026, the NHL adopted a new format featuring five All-Star teams representing the United States, Canada, Finland, Sweden, and a "World" team featuring All-Star players from other countries. Teams would play four five-minute 3-on-3 games in a round-robin tournament, with the top two teams advancing to a 10-minute final round. Teams are awarded two points for a win, one point for a tie, and no points for a loss.

== Skills Competition ==
The All-Star Game is preceded by the NHL All-Star Skills Competition, a competition showing the various talents of both the all-stars. Beginning in 2007, the All-Star weekend also featured the NHL YoungStars Game, an exhibition game exclusively featuring rookies, playing under slightly modified rules. In 2011 this game was eliminated in favor of having the rookies compete in the skills competition.

== History ==
=== Benefit games ===
The first official All-Star Game was held during the 1947–48 NHL season. Prior to that, there have been several occasions when benefit games and All-Star Games were played.

==== Hod Stuart Benefit All-Star Game ====
The first All-Star game in ice hockey predates the NHL. It was played on January 2, 1908, before 3,500 fans at the Montreal Arena between the Montreal Wanderers and a team of All-Stars players from the teams the Eastern Canada Amateur Hockey Association. It was held in memory of Wanderers player Hod Stuart, who had drowned three months after the Wanderers won the Stanley Cup in 1907. The proceeds of that game (over $2,000) went to Stuart's family.

==== Ace Bailey Benefit Game ====
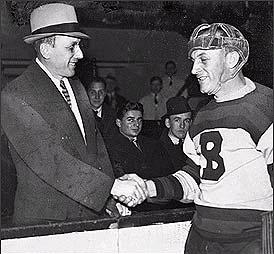
Ace Bailey (left) and Eddie Shore shake hands at the benefit game held in honour of Bailey

On December 12, 1933, Toronto's King Clancy tripped Boston's Eddie Shore, and in retaliation, Shore hit the Leafs' Ace Bailey from behind, flipping him over backwards. Bailey hit his head on the ice so hard that a priest in attendance gave him last rites. Bailey lived for almost 60 more years, but his playing career was over. Shore was suspended for 16 games of a 48-game season for the hit.

As a benefit for Bailey and his family, the NHL held its first ever All-Star game on February 14, 1934. The game was held at Maple Leaf Gardens in Toronto, during which Bailey's #6 uniform was retired by the Leafs. It was the first number to be retired in the NHL. The game saw the Leafs battle against an All-Star team made of players from the other seven teams, which the Leafs won 7–3. One of the more memorable moments before the game was when Bailey presented Shore with his All-Star jersey, showing to the public that Bailey had clearly forgiven him for his actions. Bailey also presented a trophy to NHL President Frank Calder before the game in the hope that the trophy would go to the winner of an annual All-Star Game for the benefit of injured players.

==== Howie Morenz Memorial Game ====
Howie Morenz was one of the NHL's superstars of the 1930s. However, his career, and eventually life, ended in a game between his Montreal Canadiens and the Chicago Black Hawks on January 28, 1937, at the Montreal Forum. In that game, Morenz was checked by Chicago player Earl Seibert into the boards in what seemed like a normal hit. However, as the boards were made of wood at the time, Morenz's leg shattered in five separate locations above the ankle. He was carried off the ice on a stretcher to a hospital, where he would stay for four and a half weeks until his death from a heart attack. At one time, one visitor noted that it was as if a party was being held inside of Morenz's hospital room, complete with whiskey and beer. Morenz died on March 8 the same year, from, as teammate Aurele Joliat put it, "a broken heart" (Morenz suffered a heart attack the night before). Morenz's #7 sweater, which had been hanging in its usual stall while he was in hospital, was finally retired for good.

While Morenz was in the hospital, plans for a game for Morenz's benefit were already under way. However, the game was not as successful as Bailey's game, partially because it took place many months after Morenz's passing (on November 3 at the Forum) and partially because Morenz had not survived. The game saw two All-Star teams, the first being a team of stars from the Canadiens and the Montreal Maroons, the second being an All-Star team made of players from the other teams, with the latter team winning 6–5.

==== Babe Siebert Memorial Game ====
On August 25, 1939, Babe Siebert, a Montreal Canadien who had just retired from play and had been named head coach, drowned in Lake Huron. To benefit his family, the Canadiens and Montreal Maroons organized a benefit, held on October 29 at the Montreal Forum. Six thousand fans attended a game between the Canadiens and the "NHL All-Stars", raising CA$15,000 (equivalent to $319,900 in 2025) for Siebert's family. The All-Stars won the game 5–2.

=== Official games ===
Despite Bailey's hopes of an annual All-Star Game, it did not become an annual tradition until the 1947–48 NHL season. In 1966, the All-Star Game was moved from the start of the season to its current position in the middle of the season. In 1979, the Challenge Cup series replaced the game, in 1987, it was replaced with Rendez-vous '87, and in 2025 it was replaced with the 4 Nations Face-Off. Lockouts disrupted the NHL season in 1995, 2005, and 2013 and resulted in the cancelation of the game in those years. COVID-19 led to the cancelation of the 2021 game. As part of the NHL Collective Bargaining Agreement (CBA) that expired in 2012, the NHL agreed with the NHLPA not to hold an All-Star Game during Winter Olympic years that they participated in, consequently, the contest was canceled in 2006, 2010 and 2014. In 2018, however, the contest was still played, as NHL players did not participate in that year's Winter Olympics, and in 2022, the contest was still played, with players originally going to the 2022 Winter Olympics after, but ultimately did not due to COVID-19 postponing many games.

==== 1940s ====
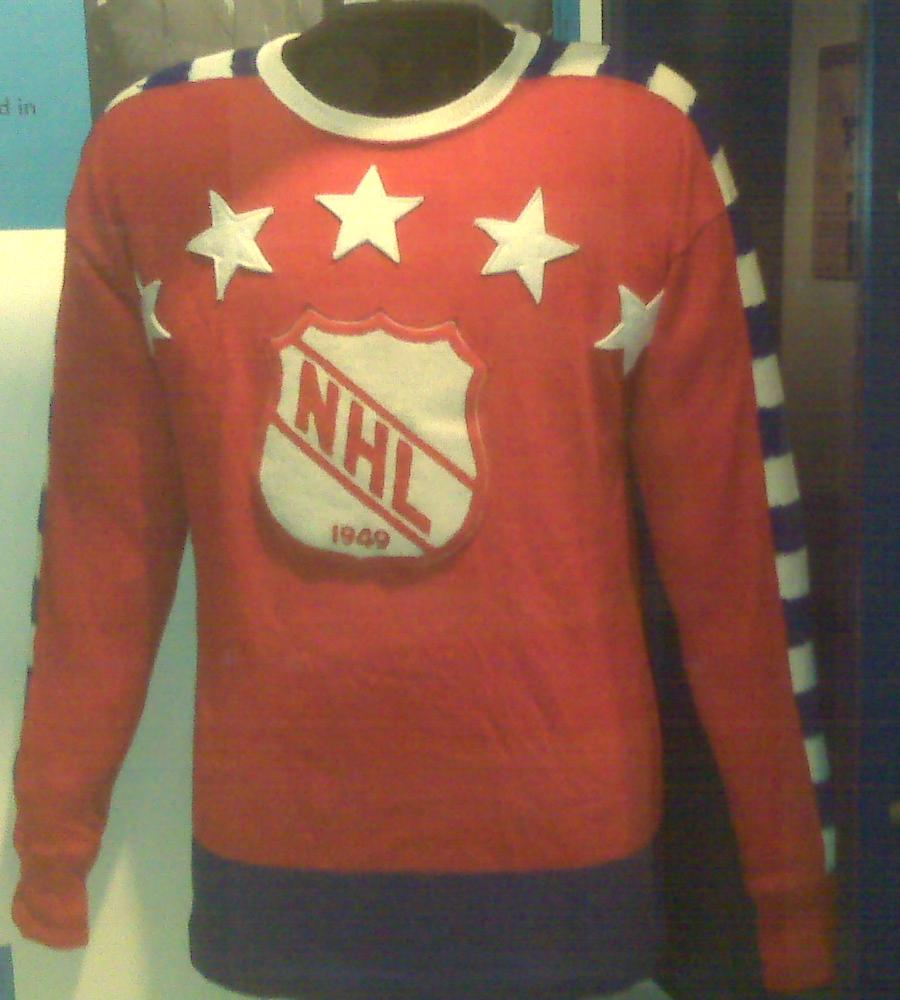
Hockey sweater worn by Maurice Richard during the 1949 All-Star Game.

Both parts of Bailey's vision would, however, come true: The first game of the annual tradition, and the first official NHL All-Star Game, would be played in Maple Leaf Gardens, on October 13, 1947. The format of the All-Star Game, which remained the same, with two exceptions, until the 1967–68 NHL season, called for the defending Stanley Cup champions to play against a selection of players from the other five teams. For the first year, the All-Stars were a team composed of the First and Second NHL All-Star teams (not to be confused with the All-Stars that played against the Cup champions), as well as three players from the New York Rangers and one player each from the Detroit Red Wings and the Chicago Black Hawks.

For the game, the Gardens facilities were upgraded to use glass on the boards (in an era where wire fences were the norm), a point that fans complained about as the sounds of the checks were somewhat muted. In what would be another tradition, the defending Stanley Cup champions were presented before the game with various gifts that included sweater coats, golf balls, cigarette boxes, ties, cufflinks, pocket knives, watches and lifetime passes to Maple Leaf Gardens. All-in-all, the game was a success, with the All-Stars winning 4–3.

Although the All-Star Game called for the defending Cup champion to host it, the game was held in Chicago Stadium in its second year as a consequence of the negotiations that set up the first game. Also as a peculiarity as a result of the scheduling, the game was held not before the season started (as was the case before and would be for almost 20 years following the game), but three weeks into the season. Like the year before, players from the First and Second NHL All-Star teams were automatically awarded spots on the All-Star Game rosters (an exception was Leafs goaltender Turk Broda, having won the Cup, played for the Leafs instead), with the rest of the all-stars being assembled so that each team was represented with at least three players on the All-Stars. As for the game itself, the All-Stars had won 3–1 with all scoring coming in the second period.

==== 1950s ====
The defending Stanley Cup champions would win their first All-Star Game in 1950 by a 7–1 margin, thanks to Detroit's Production Line and the fact that five of the First and Second NHL All-Star teams were Red Wings. Because of the one-sidedness of the game, many fans and hockey insiders considered options on how to make the All-Star Game more balanced, including one where the All-Star Game was eliminated altogether in favour of a best-of-nine Stanley Cup Finals with the proceeds of two of the games going to the players' pension fund, and one which saw a Canadian Teams vs. American Teams format (a somewhat flawed concept in that nearly all NHL players of the era, whether playing for teams representing American or Canadian cities, were Canadians). Ultimately, the 5th NHL All-Star Game saw the First NHL All-Star team battle the Second, with the players filling out the First team being from American teams and the Second team being filled with either Hab or Leaf players. The game ended in a 2–2 tie, leaving many fans upset for the second straight year. The same format of First vs. Second with the First team being augmented by players from American teams and the Second being augmented by Leaf or Hab players continued the next year, but the 6th All-Star Game proved to be 60 minutes of boring hockey as the teams skated to a 1–1 tie.

Criticisms of this new format, as well as the boring hockey, was what made the NHL revert the format of the All-Star Game to its original incarnation. Some of the criticisms included the fact that teammates often opposed each other in the All-Star Game under the new format, and some stated that the early date of the game was detrimental to the exposure of the NHL in the States, being held at the same time as the World Series and the National Football League (NFL) season. In what would be later a reality, Toronto Star columnist Red Burnett suggested that the game should be played mid-season and that fans should choose their starting lineup, a system which had long been in use in the States with regard to Major League Baseball (MLB).

==== 1960s ====
The game was moved from the start of the season to mid-season in the 1966–67 season as part of the move to promote the NHL to six new cities who would have their own teams (in October 1967). Because of the move to mid-season, the method of player selection for the All-Stars, largely unchanged for 20 years, was much scrutinized, as playing the All-Star Game mid-season meant that the first and second All-Star teams were decided almost a full year before the game itself, and that by mid-season, the Cup winners were a vastly different team from the team that had won the Cup some eight or nine months before. The mid-season move also meant that rookies with outstanding first years, such as Bobby Orr, would be shut out of the game even if they deserved a spot on the All-Stars.

The 21st All-Star Game one year later was somber compared to the 20 before it, as the days before the game were tragic. On January 14, 1968, two days before the game, Bill Masterton had been checked by two Oakland Seals players and died from his on-ice injuries. The game itself was overshadowed by the debate on whether helmets should be worn in the NHL in the fallout of Masterton's untimely death. As in the previous years, the All-Stars were represented by the first and second All-Star teams, as well as enough players so that each team was represented. The east–west format of future All-Star Games was announced in the 21st All-Star Game, with the intention of being able to move the game anywhere, alternating home ice between an East division team and a West division team year after year. The idea, along with the notion that the players chosen for the two All-Star teams should be the best at the time of the game rather than the best of the players from the season before, quickly gained popularity, although the Cup champions reserved the right to host the 22nd All-Star Game. The St. Louis Blues became the first Western host of the All-Star Game the following year. The 26th All-Star Game was the first in which the game MVP received a car as a prize.

==== 1970s ====
With the realignment of the NHL into four divisions for the 1974–75 season, the 1975 All-Star Game was the first to pit the Wales Conference against the Campbell Conference.

In 1978, amidst renewed interest in international hockey, the NHL decided to replace the 1979 All-Star Game with a three-game series where the League's top players played against the Soviet Union's top players in the Challenge Cup, held at Madison Square Garden in New York City.

The Challenge Cup was being touted as a miniature world championship, and for the first time, fans could vote for certain members of the roster. The NHL would lose the three-game series two games to one, with the third game being lost by an embarrassing 6–0 margin.

Over the next few years, various aspects of the All-Star Game came under scrutiny, including the format of the game. To make things worse, the All-Star Game itself was viewed in some circles as a bad thing, with players opting out of the game in favour of the rest and prospective hosts repeatedly declining to host the event.

==== 1980s ====
With the geographical realignment of the NHL for the 1981–82 season, the 1982 All-Star Game was the first between the Wales and Campbell Conferences that featured players from eastern teams against players from western teams.

The 37th All-Star Game in 1985 marked the first time that honorary captains were selected for each team. The game also brought forth the notion of fan balloting of the starting lineup (already adopted in the National Basketball Association and by this time had returned, following a hiatus brought on by ballot box stuffing, to MLB; the NFL gave the fans the vote in the 1990s), as the game was suffering from having little media coverage. The idea came into fruition the following year.

In 1987, the All-Star Game was pre-empted in favour of Rendez-vous '87, held at Le Colisée in Quebec City. Like the Challenge Cup before it, Rendez-Vous '87 was an event where the best the NHL could offer played against a Soviet squad which had an entire year to prepare. To reduce the possibility of the NHL being embarrassed again, Rendez-Vous '87 was a two-game affair. The series was split between the two teams with a game won by each.

During the series, NHL President John Ziegler stated that Soviet players would never be able to join the NHL because of the way the Soviet hockey programme worked, and that NHLers would never be able to play in the Winter Olympics. Soviet players would be allowed to play in the NHL within three years, and an arrangement that would allow NHL players to play in the Olympics was announced within nine.

==== 1990s ====
The 41st All-Star Game in 1990 was held on a Sunday, after having been held on Tuesdays since 1968. That edition, the NHL All-Star Skills Competition and the Heroes of Hockey game were both introduced. The Heroes of Hockey game featured NHL alumni and was set up much like the main game, with Wales vs. Campbell. Many of these players retired before the introduction of the Wales and Campbell Conferences. Future Heroes of Hockey games would have the hometown alumni play against the "best-of-the-rest", much like the all-star games of old. The 42nd All-Star Game introduced, as part of the player selection, two players chosen by the commissioner to honour their years to their game.

With the renaming of conferences and divisions on a geographical basis for the 1993–94 season, the 1994 All-Star Game was the first between East and West in name since 1974, although the Wales vs. Campbell format pitted east against west from 1982 to 1993.

The All-Star Game in 1995 was a casualty of the 1994–95 NHL lockout, which shortened that season to just 48 regular season games. San Jose, the originally scheduled venue, was instead awarded the 1997 All-Star Game. In the interim, Boston hosted the 1996 All-Star Game at the newly opened FleetCenter.

The 1998 All-Star Game featured the first change in format in years in an attempt to promote the first Olympic hockey tournament with participation from NHL players. The "First International Showdown", as it was billed, resulted in the North American All-Stars winning 8–7.

==== 2000s ====
The 2003 Game's format was reverted to its classic East vs. West format. Dany Heatley scored four goals, tying an All-Star Game record, in addition to recording a shootout goal. Heatley also set the record for being the youngest player to score a hat-trick in the All-Star Game, a record previously held by the Edmonton Oilers' Wayne Gretzky. This shootout, the first of its kind in the NHL in the modern era, received an enthusiastic, frenzied response from the crowd when it was announced, and carried on during the event. This was influential in the later decision to decide regular season games tied after overtime with a shootout, thus eliminating tie games.

The All-Star Game was dealt two serious blows in 2005. Not only was the game canceled along with the rest of the season as a result of the 2004–05 NHL lockout, but the subsequent CBA that ended the lockout stipulated that heretofore the game was to be held only in non-Olympic years. Thus, there was no All-Star Game held during the 2005–06 season either.

After a two-season absence, the 2007 Game was played in Dallas, where the West defeated the East, 12–9. Daniel Briere of the Buffalo Sabres recorded a goal and four assists and was named the game's MVP.

The Atlanta Thrashers hosted the 2008 Game, as they had been originally scheduled to host the canceled Game in 2005. The Eastern Conference won the game 8–7 on a late game-winning goal by Marc Savard with 20.9 seconds remaining in the third period, beating St. Louis Blues goaltender Manny Legace. Eric Staal was named the MVP.

In 2009, the Bell Centre, the home of the Montreal Canadiens, hosted the Game, as well as the 2009 NHL entry draft. In the game, the Eastern Conference defeated the Western Conference 12–11 in a shootout (east 2/3 west 0/2). Approximately 21,000 people attended the game, where then-Canadien Alexei Kovalev was the Eastern Conference captain and was named the game's MVP after scoring two goals and one assist, as well as the shootout winner. Montreal fans voted Kovalev into the starting lineup, in addition to teammates Andrei Markov, Carey Price and Mike Komisarek. The Canadiens were picked to host both events because the Montreal Canadiens team celebrated its 100th anniversary in 2009. The team was established in 1909 as a founding member of the National Hockey Association (NHA) which became the NHL in 1917.

A small number of All-Star players questioned their potential participation in 2009. Past and current All-Stars must obtain an excused absence (often related to injury or personal circumstances) by the League if they will not participate. If this approved absence is not obtained, a one-game regular season suspension is possible.

==== 2010s ====
There was no All-Star Game in 2010 because of both a change to the CBA and 2010 being an Olympic Games year—the 2010 Winter Olympics marked the first time that the Olympics had been hosted in an NHL market since the league allowed its players to compete in the Olympics.

The 2011 All-Star Game was played in Raleigh, North Carolina, home of the Carolina Hurricanes. Gary Bettman announced at the RBC Center on April 8, 2010, that the game would be held in Raleigh. The Phoenix Coyotes were originally slated to host the game that year in replacement of the 2006 Game, which they had again originally been awarded before the NHL ultimately decided not to hold the game the Olympic year. Amid fears that the Coyotes franchise would not "right its ship" by February 2011, however, the cities of Pittsburgh, Raleigh and Ottawa rose as candidates for the 2011 Game, with Raleigh eventually being chosen, having been promised the game since the Hurricanes reached 12,000 season ticket sales earlier in the decade. The 2011 Game also introduced a new format, replacing the traditional conference teams with a "fantasy draft." Fans voted for six players, from either conference (three forwards, two defencemen and one goaltender), while the NHL selected another 36 players for a total of 42 players. The chosen players then selected two captains for each All-Star team, who then selected their teammates in a draft. The chosen captains for the 2011 Game were Nicklas Lidstrom of Detroit and Eric Staal of Carolina.

The 2012 Game repeated the fantasy draft format, with Daniel Alfredsson and Zdeno Chara as captains. The game was played in Ottawa to honor the 20th anniversary of the Senators' joining the NHL.

The 2013 All-Star Game was originally scheduled for January 27, 2013, at Nationwide Arena in Columbus, the home of the Columbus Blue Jackets. The game was postponed to 2015, however, first due to the 2012–13 NHL lockout, which delayed the start of the 2012–13 season until January 19, 2013, followed by the inability to play in 2014 due to it falling on an Olympic Games year, where NHL players competed at the 2014 Winter Olympics. The game was eventually played on January 25, 2015.

The 2016 All-Star Game was played on January 31, 2016, at Bridgestone Arena in Nashville, the home of Nashville Predators. The format was changed so that it was no longer a singular all-star game per se; instead, four all-star teams, each representing one of the league's four divisions, participate in a two-round knockout tournament, with each game being two 10-minute halves in length and played with three skaters on each team. In addition, each division is required to select at least one player from all eight of its teams (prior to 2017, the Central and Pacific Divisions only had seven teams; both added an eighth team as of 2021), unlike in previous years where some teams were not represented in recent All-Star Games. The 2016 game was also notable for the appearance of John Scott, a journeyman enforcer who was voted into the game through the fan vote. Scott, who had been demoted to the American Hockey League after the vote, played as a member of no team and, as captain of the Pacific Division, scored two goals (after scoring none the entire regular season up to that point) and won the game's Most Valuable Player award.

The 2017 All-Star Game was played on January 29, 2017, at Staples Center in Los Angeles, to honour of the Kings' 50th anniversary. The 2018 All-Star Game was then played on January 28, 2018, at Amalie Arena in Tampa, the second time the Tampa Bay Lightning have hosted the All-Star Game, the first being in 1999, and the third overall in Florida.

The 2019 All-Star Game was hosted by the San Jose Sharks at SAP Center on January 26, 2019, the first time it was held on a Saturday after many years of the game being played on a Sunday.

==== 2020s ====
The 2020 All-Star Game was hosted by the St. Louis Blues at Enterprise Center on January 25. The city last hosted the All-Star Game in February 1988.

Originally, the 2021 All-Star Game would be hosted by the Florida Panthers at BB&T Center on January 30, which would have been its first All-Star Game hosted since February 2003. However, due to the COVID-19 pandemic delaying the conclusion of the 2019–20 season to September and postponing the start of the following season, the event was canceled, with the possibility of moving the festivities to 2022 at its earliest. The league said that it would consider changing the upcoming All-Star Game's format so it would have a "distinct international flavor", using a model similar to the World Cup of Hockey.

On June 28, 2021, the league announced that the 2022 All-Star Game would be played at T-Mobile Arena in Paradise, Nevada, home of the Vegas Golden Knights, for the first time. The league cited the fact that they had not yet signed a deal with the International Olympic Committee on sending players to the 2022 Winter Olympics, so they decided to schedule an All-Star Game anyway, at an arena in western North America to shorten travel to China if players did go. On September 3, a deal was officially reached to send players to the Olympics, with an opt-out clause should COVID-19 health conditions worsen. However, on December 22, the NHL announced that it would not send its players to the Olympics due to rising COVID-19 cases and increasing number of postponed games. Consequently, the originally scheduled Olympic break following the All-Star Game from February 7 to 22 was used to play 95 postponed games.

On February 4, 2022, the NHL awarded Sunrise, Florida, the 2023 All-Star Game, two years after Sunrise's game was canceled due to the pandemic.

The 2024 All-Star Game took place on February 3, 2024, at Scotiabank Arena in Toronto. The format was changed, combining the four-team, three-on-three format used since 2016 with the "fantasy draft" format used from 2011 to 2015. In addition to player captains Quinn Hughes, Nathan MacKinnon, Auston Matthews, and Connor McDavid, each team featured a celebrity co-captain, with Will Arnett, Justin Bieber, Michael Buble, and Tate McRae serving in the roles.

In 2025, instead of the All-Star Game, the NHL hosted a new exhibition tournament known as the 4 Nations Face-Off, which was contested between teams of NHL players representing Canada, Finland, Sweden, and the United States. The games were played under NHL rules, and split between TD Garden in Boston and Bell Centre in Montreal.

==== Future ====
The 2026 All-Star Game was to be hosted by the New York Islanders at UBS Arena, at an undetermined date prior to the Olympics. In late-April 2025, it was reported that the NHL had canceled the event, in favour of hosting a non-competition "kickoff" for the 2026 Winter Olympics (which featured NHL players). On May 5, 2025, it was reported that the NHL was considering some form of "international" event in lieu of the All-Star Game, amid the success of the 4 Nations Face-Off. New York governor Kathy Hochul called upon the NHL to fulfill its commitment to provide an event at the same or similar scale to the All-Star Game, expressing disappointment at its plans to hold a different event than awarded. Several months later, in October 2025, the NHL canceled the 2026 Olympic event entirely, instead reportedly awarding UBS Arena the 2027 All-Star Game.

==== Yet to host ====
As of the completion of the 2024 All-Star Game, a number of current NHL cities, teams or arenas have never hosted the event.

Six current NHL cities have never hosted the All-Star Game: Anaheim, Newark, Salt Lake City, Seattle, Washington, D.C., and Winnipeg.

Of the NHL home teams in those six cities, four have never hosted the All-Star Game: Anaheim Ducks (started play in 1993), Utah Mammoth (started play in 2024), Seattle Kraken (started play in 2021) and Winnipeg Jets (started play, as Jets, in 2011). The teams in the remaining two cities, New Jersey Devils and Washington Capitals, hosted the game while located in a nearby suburb of their current city.

Of the current NHL arenas in the league, accounting for both new arenas and cities that have never hosted, 13 current NHL arenas have never hosted the All-Star Game: Anaheim's Honda Center, Buffalo's KeyBank Center, Chicago's United Center, Detroit's Little Caesars Arena, Edmonton's Rogers Place, Elmont's UBS Arena, Newark's Prudential Center, Philadelphia's Xfinity Mobile Arena, Pittsburgh's PPG Paints Arena, Salt Lake City's Delta Center, Seattle's Climate Pledge Arena, Washington, D.C.'s Capital One Arena and Winnipeg's Canada Life Centre.

== Results ==
Game (Year)	Result	Host team	Host arena	Host city	Game MVP, Team
1st (1947)	All–Stars 4 – Maple Leafs 3	Toronto Maple Leafs (Note: By design, from 1947 through 1969 (with the exception of 1948), the reigning Stanley Cup champions hosted the All-Star Game. Any such occurrences thereafter were by coincidence.)	Maple Leaf Gardens	Toronto, Ontario	Not yet awarded
2nd (1948)	All–Stars 3 – Maple Leafs 1	Chicago Black Hawks	Chicago Stadium	Chicago, Illinois	Not yet awarded
3rd (1949)	All–Stars 3 – Maple Leafs 1	Toronto Maple Leafs (2)	Maple Leaf Gardens (2)	Toronto, Ontario (2)	Not yet awarded
4th (1950)	Red Wings 7 – All–Stars 1	Detroit Red Wings	Olympia Stadium	Detroit, Michigan	Not yet awarded
5th (1951)	First Team 2 – Second Team 2	Toronto Maple Leafs (3)	Maple Leaf Gardens (3)	Toronto, Ontario (3)	Not yet awarded
6th (1952)	First Team 1 – Second Team 1	Detroit Red Wings (2)	Olympia Stadium (2)	Detroit, Michigan (2)	Not yet awarded
7th (1953)	All–Stars 3 – Canadiens 1	Montreal Canadiens	Montreal Forum	Montreal, Quebec	Not yet awarded
8th (1954)	All–Stars 2 – Red Wings 2	Detroit Red Wings (3)	Olympia Stadium (3)	Detroit, Michigan (3)	Not yet awarded
9th (1955)	Red Wings 3 – All–Stars 1	Detroit Red Wings (4)	Olympia Stadium (4)	Detroit, Michigan (4)	Not yet awarded
10th (1956)	All–Stars 1 – Canadiens 1	Montreal Canadiens (2)	Montreal Forum (2)	Montreal, Quebec (2)	Not yet awarded
11th (1957)	All Stars 5 – Canadiens 3	Montreal Canadiens (3)	Montreal Forum (3)	Montreal, Quebec (3)	Not yet awarded
12th (1958)	Canadiens 6 – All–Stars 3	Montreal Canadiens (4)	Montreal Forum (4)	Montreal, Quebec (4)	Not yet awarded
13th (1959)	Canadiens 6 – All–Stars 1	Montreal Canadiens (5)	Montreal Forum (5)	Montreal, Quebec (5)	Not yet awarded
14th (1960)	All–Stars 2 – Canadiens 1	Montreal Canadiens (6)	Montreal Forum (6)	Montreal, Quebec (6)	Not yet awarded
15th (1961)	All–Stars 3 – Black Hawks 1	Chicago Black Hawks (2)	Chicago Stadium (2)	Chicago, Illinois (2)	Not yet awarded
16th (1962)	Maple Leafs 4 – All–Stars 1	Toronto Maple Leafs (4)	Maple Leaf Gardens (4)	Toronto, Ontario (4)	Eddie Shack, Toronto Maple Leafs
17th (1963)	All–Stars 3 – Maple Leafs 3	Toronto Maple Leafs (5)	Maple Leaf Gardens (5)	Toronto, Ontario (5)	Frank Mahovlich, Toronto Maple Leafs
18th (1964)	All–Stars 3 – Maple Leafs 2	Toronto Maple Leafs (6)	Maple Leaf Gardens (6)	Toronto, Ontario (6)	Jean Beliveau, Montreal Canadiens
19th (1965)	All–Stars 5 – Canadiens 2	Montreal Canadiens (7)	Montreal Forum (7)	Montreal, Quebec (7)	Gordie Howe, Detroit Red Wings
(1966)	No game was held in calendar 1966 as the event was shifted from the 1966 to the 1967 portion of 1966–67 season.				
20th (1967)	Canadiens 3 – All–Stars 0	Montreal Canadiens (8)	Montreal Forum (8)	Montreal, Quebec (8)	Henri Richard, Montreal Canadiens
21st (1968)	Maple Leafs 4 – All–Stars 3	Toronto Maple Leafs (7)	Maple Leaf Gardens (7)	Toronto, Ontario (7)	Bruce Gamble, Toronto Maple Leafs
22nd (1969)	East 3 – West 3	Montreal Canadiens (9)	Montreal Forum (9)	Montreal, Quebec (9)	Frank Mahovlich, Detroit Red Wings
23rd (1970)	East 4 – West 1	St. Louis Blues	St. Louis Arena	St. Louis, Missouri	Bobby Hull, Chicago Black Hawks
24th (1971)	West 2 – East 1	Boston Bruins	Boston Garden	Boston, Massachusetts	Bobby Hull, Chicago Black Hawks
25th (1972)	East 3 – West 2	Minnesota North Stars	Met Center	Bloomington, Minnesota	Bobby Orr, Boston Bruins
26th (1973)	East 5 – West 4	New York Rangers	Madison Square Garden	New York City, New York	Greg Polis, Pittsburgh Penguins
27th (1974)	West 6 – East 4	Chicago Black Hawks (3)	Chicago Stadium (3)	Chicago, Illinois (3)	Garry Unger, St. Louis Blues
28th (1975)	Wales 7 – Campbell 1	Montreal Canadiens (10)	Montreal Forum (10)	Montreal, Quebec (10)	Syl Apps Jr., Pittsburgh Penguins
29th (1976)	Wales 7 – Campbell 5	Philadelphia Flyers	The Spectrum	Philadelphia, Pennsylvania	Peter Mahovlich, Montreal Canadiens
30th (1977)	Wales 4 – Campbell 3	Vancouver Canucks	Pacific Coliseum	Vancouver, British Columbia	Rick Martin, Buffalo Sabres
31st (1978)	Wales 3 – Campbell 2 (OT)	Buffalo Sabres	Buffalo Memorial Auditorium	Buffalo, New York	Billy Smith, New York Islanders
Challenge Cup (1979)	NHL All-Stars 4 – Soviet Union 2 Soviet Union 5 – NHL All-Stars 4 Soviet Union 6 – NHL All-Stars 0 Soviet Union wins series 2–1	New York Rangers (2)	Madison Square Garden (2)	New York, New York (2)	Not awarded
32nd (1980)	Wales 6 – Campbell 3	Detroit Red Wings (5)	Joe Louis Arena	Detroit, Michigan (5)	Reggie Leach, Philadelphia Flyers
33rd (1981)	Campbell 4 – Wales 1	Los Angeles Kings	The Forum	Inglewood, California	Mike Liut, St. Louis Blues
34th (1982)	Wales 4 – Campbell 2	Washington Capitals	Capital Centre	Landover, Maryland	Mike Bossy, New York Islanders
35th (1983)	Campbell 9 – Wales 3	New York Islanders	Nassau Coliseum	Uniondale, New York	Wayne Gretzky, Edmonton Oilers
36th (1984)	Wales 7 – Campbell 6	New Jersey Devils	Brendan Byrne Arena	East Rutherford, New Jersey	Don Maloney, New York Rangers
37th (1985)	Wales 6 – Campbell 4	Calgary Flames	Olympic Saddledome	Calgary, Alberta	Mario Lemieux, Pittsburgh Penguins
38th (1986)	Wales 4 – Campbell 3 (OT)	Hartford Whalers	Hartford Civic Center	Hartford, Connecticut	Grant Fuhr, Edmonton Oilers
Rendez-vous '87 (1987)	NHL All-Stars 4 – Soviet Union 3 Soviet Union 5 – NHL All-Stars 3 Soviet Union wins 8–7 on aggregate	Quebec Nordiques	Le Colisée	Quebec City, Quebec	Not awarded
39th (1988)	Wales 6 – Campbell 5 (OT)	St. Louis Blues (2)	St. Louis Arena (2)	St. Louis, Missouri (2)	Mario Lemieux, Pittsburgh Penguins
40th (1989)	Campbell 9 – Wales 5	Edmonton Oilers	Northlands Coliseum	Edmonton, Alberta	Wayne Gretzky, Los Angeles Kings
41st (1990)	Wales 12 – Campbell 7	Pittsburgh Penguins	Pittsburgh Civic Arena	Pittsburgh, Pennsylvania	Mario Lemieux, Pittsburgh Penguins
42nd (1991)	Campbell 11 – Wales 5	Chicago Blackhawks (4)	Chicago Stadium (4)	Chicago, Illinois (4)	Vincent Damphousse, Toronto Maple Leafs
43rd (1992)	Campbell 10 – Wales 6	Philadelphia Flyers (2)	The Spectrum (2)	Philadelphia, Pennsylvania (2)	Brett Hull, St. Louis Blues
44th (1993)	Wales 16 – Campbell 6	Montreal Canadiens (11)	Montreal Forum (11)	Montreal, Quebec (11)	Mike Gartner, New York Rangers
1994	East 9 – West 8	New York Rangers (3)	Madison Square Garden (3)	New York, New York (3)	Mike Richter, New York Rangers
(1995)	Game canceled due to the 1994–95 NHL lockout. Game was originally set to play at the San Jose Arena in San Jose, California.				
1996	East 5 – West 4	Boston Bruins (2)	FleetCenter	Boston, Massachusetts (2)	Ray Bourque, Boston Bruins
1997	East 11 – West 7	San Jose Sharks	San Jose Arena	San Jose, California	Mark Recchi, Montreal Canadiens
1998	North America 8 – World 7	Vancouver Canucks (2)	General Motors Place	Vancouver, British Columbia (2)	Teemu Selanne, Mighty Ducks of Anaheim
1999	North America 8 – World 6	Tampa Bay Lightning	Ice Palace	Tampa, Florida	Wayne Gretzky, New York Rangers
2000	World 9 – North America 4	Toronto Maple Leafs (8)	Air Canada Centre	Toronto, Ontario (8)	Pavel Bure, Florida Panthers
2001	North America 14 – World 12	Colorado Avalanche	Pepsi Center	Denver, Colorado	Bill Guerin, Boston Bruins
2002	World 8 – North America 5	Los Angeles Kings (2)	Staples Center	Los Angeles, California	Eric Daze, Chicago Blackhawks
2003	West 6 – East 5 (SO)	Florida Panthers	Office Depot Center	Sunrise, Florida	Dany Heatley, Atlanta Thrashers
2004	East 6 – West 4	Minnesota Wild	Xcel Energy Center	Saint Paul, Minnesota	Joe Sakic, Colorado Avalanche
(2005)	Game canceled due to the 2004–05 NHL lockout. Game was originally set to play at the Philips Arena in Atlanta, Georgia.				
(2006)	Game canceled due to the 2006 Winter Olympics in Turin, Italy. Game was originally set to play at Jobing.com Arena in Glendale, Arizona.				
2007	West 12 – East 9	Dallas Stars	American Airlines Center	Dallas, Texas	Daniel Briere, Buffalo Sabres
2008	East 8 – West 7	Atlanta Thrashers	Philips Arena	Atlanta, Georgia	Eric Staal, Carolina Hurricanes
2009	East 12 – West 11 (SO)	Montreal Canadiens (12)	Bell Centre	Montreal, Quebec (12)	Alexei Kovalev, Montreal Canadiens
(2010)	No game was held due to the 2010 Winter Olympics in Vancouver, British Columbia.				
2011	Team Lidstrom 11 – Team Staal 10	Carolina Hurricanes	RBC Center	Raleigh, North Carolina	Patrick Sharp, Chicago Blackhawks
2012	Team Chara 12 – Team Alfredsson 9	Ottawa Senators	Scotiabank Place	Ottawa, Ontario	Marian Gaborik, New York Rangers
(2013)	Game canceled due to the 2012–13 NHL lockout and then rescheduled due to the 2014 Winter Olympics in Sochi, Russia. Game was originally set to play at the Nationwide Arena in Columbus, Ohio.				
(2014)	Game canceled due to the 2012–13 NHL lockout and then rescheduled due to the 2014 Winter Olympics in Sochi, Russia. Game was originally set to play at the Nationwide Arena in Columbus, Ohio.				
2015	Team Toews 17 – Team Foligno 12	Columbus Blue Jackets	Nationwide Arena	Columbus, Ohio	Ryan Johansen, Columbus Blue Jackets
2016	Atlantic 4 – Metropolitan 3 Pacific 9 – Central 6 Pacific 1 – Atlantic 0	Nashville Predators	Bridgestone Arena	Nashville, Tennessee	John Scott (Note: Scott was selected as an All-Star while he was a member of the Arizona Coyotes, through a fan vote. Between the time of being voted in and the game, Scott was traded on January 15 to the Montreal Canadiens, who sent him down to their AHL affiliate St. John's IceCaps; the league, on January 19, cleared Scott to remain in the All-Star Game. As a result of the trade and demotion, Scott wore a generic NHL jersey in the Skills Competition and did not represent any specific team.)
2017	Pacific 10 – Central 3 Metropolitan 10 – Atlantic 6 Metropolitan 4 – Pacific 3	Los Angeles Kings (3)	Staples Center (2)	Los Angeles, California (2)	Wayne Simmonds, Philadelphia Flyers
2018	Pacific 5 – Central 2 Atlantic 7 – Metropolitan 4 Pacific 5 – Atlantic 2	Tampa Bay Lightning (2)	Amalie Arena (2)	Tampa, Florida (2)	Brock Boeser, Vancouver Canucks
2019	Central 10 – Pacific 4 Metropolitan 7 – Atlantic 4 Metropolitan 10 – Central 5	San Jose Sharks (2)	SAP Center (2)	San Jose, California (2)	Sidney Crosby, Pittsburgh Penguins
2020	Atlantic 9 – Metropolitan 5 Pacific 10 – Central 5 Pacific 5 – Atlantic 4	St. Louis Blues (3)	Enterprise Center	St. Louis, Missouri (3)	David Pastrnak, Boston Bruins
(2021)	Game canceled due to the COVID-19 pandemic. Game was originally set to play at the BB&T Center in Sunrise, Florida.				
2022	Metropolitan 6 – Pacific 4 Central 8 – Atlantic 5 Metropolitan 5 – Central 3	Vegas Golden Knights	T-Mobile Arena	Paradise, Nevada	Claude Giroux, Philadelphia Flyers
2023	Central 6 – Pacific 4 Atlantic 10 – Metropolitan 6 Atlantic 7 – Central 5	Florida Panthers (2)	FLA Live Arena (2)	Sunrise, Florida (2)	Matthew Tkachuk, Florida Panthers
2024	Team McDavid 4 – Team MacKinnon 3 Team Matthews 6 – Team Hughes 5 Team Matthews 7 – Team McDavid 4	Toronto Maple Leafs (9)	Scotiabank Arena (2)	Toronto, Ontario (9)	Auston Matthews, Toronto Maple Leafs
4 Nations Face-Off (2025)	Round-robin: United States – 6 points Canada – 5 points Sweden – 5 points Finland – 2 points Final: Canada 3 – United States 2 (OT)	Montreal Canadiens (13) Boston Bruins (3)	Bell Centre (2) TD Garden (2)	Montreal, Quebec (13) Boston, Massachusetts (3)	Nathan MacKinnon, Colorado Avalanche
(2026)	Game canceled due to the 2026 Winter Olympics in Milan–Cortina d'Ampezzo, Italy. Game was originally set to play at UBS Arena in Elmont, New York.				
2027	TBD	New York Islanders (2)	UBS Arena	Elmont, New York	TBD
(2028)	No game will be held due to the World Cup of Hockey.				

== Statistical leaders ==
=== Leading scorers ===
Player	Points	Goals	Assists	Games played
Wayne Gretzky	25	13	12	18
Mario Lemieux	23	13	10	10
Joe Sakic	22	6	16	12
Mark Messier	20	6	14	15
Gordie Howe	19	10	9	23

=== Most appearances ===
- Gordie Howe, 23 times
- Ray Bourque, 19 times
- Wayne Gretzky, 18 times
- Frank Mahovlich, 15 times
- Mark Messier, 15 times
- Paul Coffey, 14 times
- Jean Béliveau, 13 times
- Scott Stevens, 13 times
- Alex Delvecchio, 13 times
- Glenn Hall, 13 times
- Al MacInnis, 13 times
- Jaromír Jágr, 13 times
- Alexander Ovechkin, 13 times
- Joe Sakic, 12 times (elected to the team 13 times, was injured in 1997)
- Terry Sawchuk, 11 times
- Claude Provost, 11 times
- Patrick Roy, 11 times
- Chris Chelios, 11 times
- Nicklas Lidström, 11 times
- Ted Lindsay 11 Times
- Teemu Selänne, 11 times
- Brian Leetch, 10 times
- Mario Lemieux, 10 times
- Jari Kurri, 10 times
- Steve Yzerman, 10 times
- Sidney Crosby, 10 times
- Martin Brodeur, 9 times (elected to the team 10 times, was injured in 2008)
- Patrick Kane, 9 times
