= 2027 National Hockey League All-Star Game =

Professional ice hockey exhibition game

2027 NHL All-Star Game

Tournament details
- Venue(s): UBS Arena, Elmont
- Dates: February 6, 2027
- Teams: 5

The 2027 National Hockey League All-Star Game is the upcoming 69th edition of the National Hockey League All-Star Game, planned to be held on February 6, 2027 at UBS Arena in Elmont, the home of the New York Islanders. The game was originally scheduled for 2026 but was postponed a year due to the league's return to Olympic participation at the 2026 Games in Milan and Cortina d'Ampezzo, Italy.

For this edition, the all-star game's three-on-three format expands to a five-team round-robin tournament, with teams representing Canada, Finland, Sweden, and the United States, alongside a "Rest of the World" team.

== History ==
The NHL originally awarded the Islanders as the 2026 All-Star Game's hosts on February 18, 2024, during the 2024 NHL Stadium Series. This game would have been the first time since 1994 in New York City that the state of New York hosted the game. This would have been the Islanders' second time hosting the NHL All-Star Game, after the 1983 game at the Nassau Coliseum, and the first time that UBS Arena would have hosted the game, after its opening during the 2021–22 season.

As originally scheduled for 2026, the All-Star Game would have returned after a one-year hiatus, as in 2025 the NHL held the 4 Nations Face-Off as a preview for the league's return to Olympic participation at the 2026 Games in Milan and Cortina d'Ampezzo, Italy, as well as the next World Cup of Hockey in 2028. The All-Star Game would have thus been the first held in the same year as Olympic participation since 2002. Commissioner Gary Bettman further stated that the league planned to use the 2026 game as a "send-off" to the Olympics. However, by April 2025, the league decided to cancel the game and instead hold an alternative Olympic send-off event at UBS Arena; this event itself was later canceled in October 2025, with Long Island now scheduled to host the 2027 game.

== Format ==
On June 2, 2026, the NHL announced significant changes to the All-Star Game format. Five teams will compete: the four nations that participated in the 2025 4 Nations Face-Off (Canada, Finland, Sweden, the United States) will be joined by a club representing players from the "Rest of World". Russian players will be eligible to join the Rest of the World team despite the IIHF's ongoing suspension of Russia due to the Russo-Ukrainian war.

Each team will participate in a three-on-three, round-robin tournament, playing four games against the other four teams. These games will be five-minutes long with no overtimes or shootouts; a game that is tied after the five minutes will end as a tie. Teams will be ranked according to points earned (2 points for a win, 1 point for a tie, 0 points for a loss). The top two teams with the most points will then advance to a 10-minute final.

== Rosters ==
Each team will consist of nine skaters and two goaltenders. The league and the National Hockey League Players' Association (NHLPA) will initially nominate 30 players for each team. A fan vote will then select eight players for each team. The remaining three players for each team, one forward, one defenceman, and one goaltender, will be selected by the league and NHLPA.

== Skills Competition ==
On June 2, 2026, the NHL announced that only players 25 or younger will participate in this year's NHL All-Star Skills Competition. Ten players will be jointly selected by the league and NHLPA. Each player will first compete in four of the following six events: Fastest Skater, Hardest Shot, Stick Handling, One Timers, Passing Challenge, and Accuracy Shooting, with points given out based on the players' results. The top eight advanced to the One-on-One shootout. From there, the top four will advance to a shootout. The top two will then advance to the final event, the Obstacle Course, with the winner of the competition winning a trophy and $1 million.
