= Howie Meeker =

Canadian politician and ice hockey player (1923–2020)

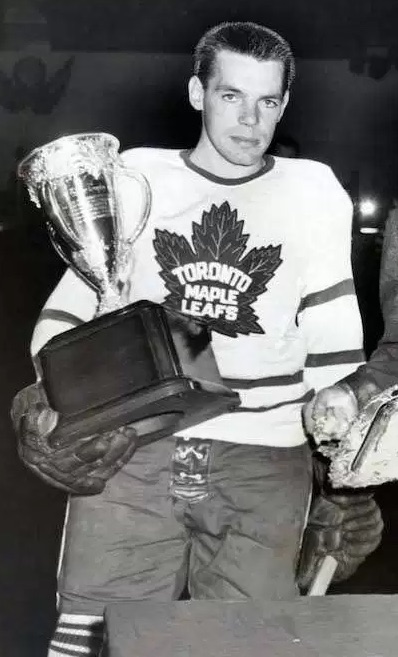
- Meeker with the Toronto Maple Leafs in 1947
- Born: November 4, 1923 Kitchener, Ontario, Canada
- Died: November 8, 2020 (aged 97) Nanaimo, British Columbia, Canada
- Height: 5 ft 9 in (175 cm)
- Weight: 165 lb (75 kg; 11 st 11 lb)
- Position: Right wing
- Shot: Right
- Played for: Toronto Maple Leafs
- Playing career: 1946–1955

Member of Parliament for Waterloo South
- In office June 25, 1951 – August 9, 1953
- Preceded by: Karl Homuth
- Succeeded by: Arthur White

Personal details
- Party: Progressive Conservative

Howard William Meeker CM (November 4, 1923 – November 8, 2020) was a Canadian professional hockey player in the National Hockey League (NHL), youth coach and educator in ice hockey, and a Progressive Conservative Member of Parliament. He became best known to Canadians as an excitable and enthusiastic television colour commentator for Hockey Night in Canada, breaking down strategy in between periods of games with early use of the telestrator. In the 1970s, he ran hockey camps and created numerous books and a television series promoting youth education in the sport.

In the NHL, he won the Calder Memorial Trophy as the best rookie, is one of the few professional players to score five goals in a game, and won four Stanley Cups, all with the Toronto Maple Leafs. He was given the Order of Canada and is in the Ontario Sports Hall of Fame, and received the Foster Hewitt Memorial Award as a hockey broadcaster.

Meeker was the last surviving member of the Maple Leafs 1947 Stanley Cup team, the Maple Leafs 1949 Stanley Cup team, the Maple Leafs 1951 Stanley Cup team, and the inaugural NHL All-Star Game.

== Biography ==
=== Early life ===
Meeker was born in Kitchener, Ontario, the son of Kathleen Wharnsby and Charles Howard Meeker, and raised in New Hamburg, Ontario He played his junior hockey with the Kitchener Greenshirts in the Ontario Hockey Association. In 1941–42, Meeker joined the Stratford Kist. In only 13 games, he scored 29 goals and had 45 points, helping the Kist win the OHA Junior-B title. He played one more year of junior hockey before joining the Canadian Army. Meeker was badly injured during the war, but he made a full recovery. In 1945–46, after World War II had ended, Meeker returned to the OHA and played one season with the Stratford Indians.

=== Professional career ===
Meeker was a right winger. In 1946–47, he joined the Toronto Maple Leafs in the National Hockey League. He scored 27 goals and 45 points during his debut NHL season and was awarded the Calder Memorial Trophy. Meeker also played in the 1947 NHL All-Star Game, and tied an NHL record for most goals by a rookie in one game with five goals against the Chicago Black Hawks. He won his first Stanley Cup with the Leafs that season, the first of three consecutive Stanley Cups. Meeker's rookie season was his best one as a pro, and he never approached that level of scoring again.

In 1947–48, Meeker scored 34 points in 58 games and played in the 1948 NHL All-Star Game. He also helped the Leafs win their second consecutive Stanley Cup. Next season, Meeker sustained a collarbone injury that limited him to 30 games; he did not play in the playoffs as the Leafs took their third consecutive Stanley Cup. In 1950–51, Meeker won his fourth Stanley Cup with the Leafs as they beat the Montreal Canadiens in five games. He played three more seasons with the Leafs before retiring from the NHL. He continued to play hockey sporadically for 15 more years with different senior clubs, and retired from playing in 1969.

=== Coaching and general management ===
He also coached the Maple Leafs, replacing King Clancy on April 11, 1956, leading the Leafs to a 21–34–15 record. He was promoted to general manager in 1957 but was fired before the start of the 1957–58 season.

=== Political career ===
Meeker spent two years as a Progressive Conservative MP while playing for the Leafs. In June 1951, Meeker won the federal by-election in the Ontario riding of Waterloo South. He did not seek re-election in the 1953 election.

Canadian federal by-election, June 25, 1951: Waterloo South Death of Karl Homuth
Party	Candidate	Votes	%	±%
Progressive Conservative	Howie Meeker	8,950	42.24	+3.50
Liberal	J. Mel Moffatt	6,483	30.60	-6.62
Co-operative Commonwealth	Margaret Geens	5,754	27.16	+3.12
Total valid votes		21,187	100.0	
Progressive Conservative hold		Swing		+5.06
Source(s) "Waterloo South, Ontario (1867-1968)". History of Federal Ridings Since 1867. Library of Parliament.

=== Hockey camps ===
Meeker later ran hockey schools as summer camps in Canada and the United States. His book Howie Meeker's Hockey Basics, published in 1973, and his weekly telecasts based on these camps, Howie Meeker's Hockey School, which ran from 1973 to 1977 on CBC Television, cemented his reputation in the coaching trade. The TV show was produced in St. John's, Newfoundland. It featured boys learning the basic skills of the game: skating, puck control, and passing. Meeker's encouragement and delivery were all based on his premise that the game was suffering from poor instruction at the junior levels. He felt the game was not being taught properly so his message was directed at coaches across Canada. He also made vocal and detailed complaints about poor quality hockey equipment for child players, especially concerning protective gear. The television series had 107 fifteen-minute episodes. It was produced and directed by Ron Harrison and/or John Spaulding and aired weekly during the hockey season.

=== Broadcasting career ===
In the 1970s and 1980s, Meeker became known to a new generation of hockey fans as an excitable, dynamic studio analyst-colour commentator on Hockey Night in Canada. He would replay footage taken from an overhead camera that provided a full view of the ice, then use a telestrator to demonstrate his points. During the telestrator segments, his favourite directive was, "stop it right here", to freeze the screen in order to analyze specifics in the replay. He also worked on Vancouver Canucks telecasts on BCTV. When TSN gained NHL cable TV broadcast rights in 1987, Meeker joined their team, where he stayed until retiring in 1998. Meeker often used the phrase, "Keep your stick on the ice" (later popularized as a slogan of comedian Red Green) during his educational segments on Hockey Night in Canada.

=== Philanthropic work ===
Meeker was involved with Special Olympics for over 40 years. He helped launch Special Olympics Canada after being invited to participate by former NHL referee Harry "Red" Foster shortly after the Special Olympics movement was created by Eunice Kennedy Shriver in the United States. In 1988, at the age of 64, Meeker was contacted by Campbell River Special Olympics in Campbell River, British Columbia, to help with setting up a fundraising golf tournament for the local Special Olympics organization. He was initially serving as a go-between to get a regional sports star involved but eventually, Meeker himself lent his name and support to the Howie Meeker Charity Golf Classic at Storey Creek Golf Club. Each year for the next 30 years, Meeker participated in the successful fundraiser in person. In his 94th year and at the 30th running of the event in August 2018, it was announced that Meeker would be taking a step back and welcoming a new co-host to carry on with the event. NHL player Clayton Stoner had signed on to be co-host with Meeker to ensure the fundraiser continues in Meeker's name into the future.

In 2004, Meeker was invited to headline a golf tournament fundraiser to benefit BC Guide Dog Services. Originally intended as a one-off event, it was such a success that the Howie Meeker Golf for Guide Dogs tournament ran on Vancouver Island for four years and is now held annually in the Metro Vancouver area. From this beginning, Meeker and his wife, Leah, became the patrons for BC Guide Dog Services, and through their involvement had helped raise over $350,000 as of July 2011.

== Personal life ==
Meeker moved to St. John's, Newfoundland, in the late 1950s, then relocated to Vancouver in the late 1970s. He had six children with his first wife Grace, with whom he was married for 55 years until she died in 1998. Meeker later lived with his second wife Leah, in Parksville, British Columbia. He died on November 8, 2020, in a hospital in Nanaimo, British Columbia.

== Awards and achievements ==
- OHA 1942 season: Scored 29 goals and had 45 points in 13 games.
- Calder Memorial Trophy winner in 1947.
- Played in 1947, 1948 and 1949 NHL All-Star Games.
- Stanley Cup champion in 1947, 1948, 1949, and 1951.
- On January 8, 1947, Meeker scored 5 goals in a game against the Chicago Blackhawks.
- Foster Hewitt Memorial Award winner in 1998 for "Excellence in Hockey Broadcasting"
- Inducted into the Hockey Hall of Fame in 1998 as a broadcaster.
- On December 30, 2010, Meeker was named a Member of the Order of Canada.
- In 2010, Meeker was inducted into the Ontario Sports Hall of Fame.
- Was the fastest Maple Leafs player to score 25 goals (surpassed by Auston Matthews).

== Career statistics ==
			Regular season					Playoffs				
Season	Team	League	GP	G	A	Pts	PIM	GP	G	A	Pts	PIM
1940–41	Kitchener Greenshirts	Big-10 Jr. B	9	13	10	23	2	4	4	2	6	0
1941–42	Stratford Kist	Big-10 Jr. B	13	29	16	45	20	4	8	11	19	4
1941–42	Stratford Kist	M-Cup	—	—	—	—	—	9	13	1	14	2
1942–43	Stratford Kroehlers	OHA-Jr.	6	6	4	10	4	2	0	1	1	0
1942–43	Brantford Lions	OHA-Jr.	—	—	—	—	—	2	0	1	1	0
1945–46	Stratford Indians	OHA-Jr.	7	8	5	13	4	5	6	5	11	0
1946–47	Toronto Maple Leafs	NHL	55	27	18	45	76	11	3	3	6	6
1947–48	Toronto Maple Leafs	NHL	58	14	20	34	62	9	2	4	6	15
1948–49	Toronto Maple Leafs	NHL	30	7	7	14	56	—	—	—	—	—
1949–50	Toronto Maple Leafs	NHL	70	18	22	40	35	7	0	1	1	4
1950–51	Toronto Maple Leafs	NHL	49	6	14	20	24	11	1	1	2	14
1951–52	Toronto Maple Leafs	NHL	54	9	14	23	50	4	0	0	0	11
1952–53	Toronto Maple Leafs	NHL	25	1	7	8	26	—	—	—	—	—
1953–54	Toronto Maple Leafs	NHL	5	1	0	1	0	—	—	—	—	—
1954–55	Pittsburgh Hornets	AHL	2	0	0	0	2	—	—	—	—	—
NHL totals			346	83	102	185	329	42	6	9	15	50

== Coaching record ==
Team	Year	Regular season							Postseason
Team	Year	G	W	L	T	OTL	Pts	Finish	Result
TOR	1956–57	70	21	34	15	-	57	5th in NHL	Did not qualify

== See also ==
- List of players with 5 or more goals in an NHL game

Preceded by Edgar Laprade	Winner of the Calder Memorial Trophy; 1947	Succeeded by Jim McFadden
Preceded by King Clancy	Head coach of the Toronto Maple Leafs; 1956–57	Succeeded by Billy Reay
Preceded by Karl Homuth	Member of Parliament from Waterloo South; 1951–53	Succeeded by Arthur White
