= 1944 Memorial Cup =

Canadian junior ice hockey championship

The Memorial Cup trophy

The 1944 Memorial Cup final was the 26th junior ice hockey championship of the Canadian Amateur Hockey Association (CAHA). The finals were held at Maple Leaf Gardens in Toronto. CAHA president Frank Sargent chose the location to maximize profits, which were reinvested into minor ice hockey in Canada.

The George Richardson Memorial Trophy champions Oshawa Generals of the Ontario Hockey Association in Eastern Canada competed against the Abbott Cup champions Trail Smoke Eaters of the Western Kootenay Junior Hockey League in Western Canada. In a best-of-seven series, held at Maple Leaf Gardens in Toronto, Ontario, Oshawa won their 3rd Memorial Cup, defeating Trail 4 games to 0.

== Scores ==
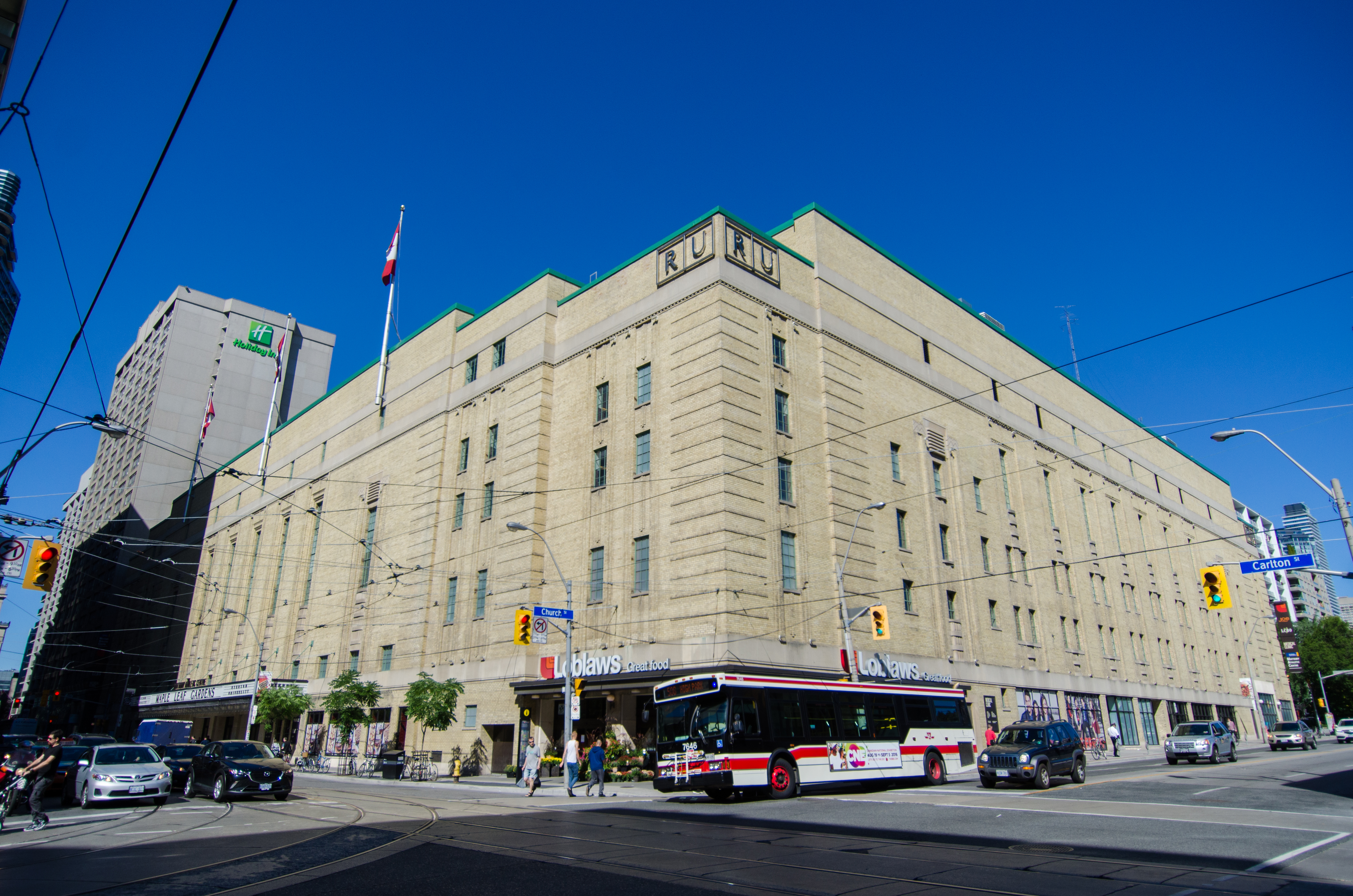
Maple Leaf Gardens

- Game 1: Oshawa 9-2 Trail
- Game 2: Oshawa 5-2 Trail
- Game 3: Oshawa 15-4 Trail
- Game 4: Oshawa 11-4 Trail

== Winning roster ==
Bill Barker, Don Batten, David Bauer, Harvey Bennett, Johnny Chenier, Floyd Curry, Bob Dawes, Bill Ezinicki, Ted Lindsay, Bobby Love, Johnny Marois, Murdie MacMillan, Gus Mortson, Bob Porter, Bert Shewchuck, Ken Smith, Jack Taggart. Coach: Charlie Conacher
