= 3rd National Hockey League All-Star Game =

Professional ice hockey exhibition game

3rd NHL All-Star Game
	1	2	3	Total
All-Stars	1	1	1	3
Toronto Maple Leafs	1	0	0	1
- Date: October 10, 1949
- Arena: Maple Leaf Gardens
- City: Toronto
- Attendance: 13,541

The 3rd National Hockey League All-Star Game took place at Maple Leaf Gardens, home of the Toronto Maple Leafs, on October 10, 1949. For the third year in a row, the game saw the Maple Leafs play a team of NHL all-stars. The All-Stars won the game by a score of 3–1, the same as the previous game.

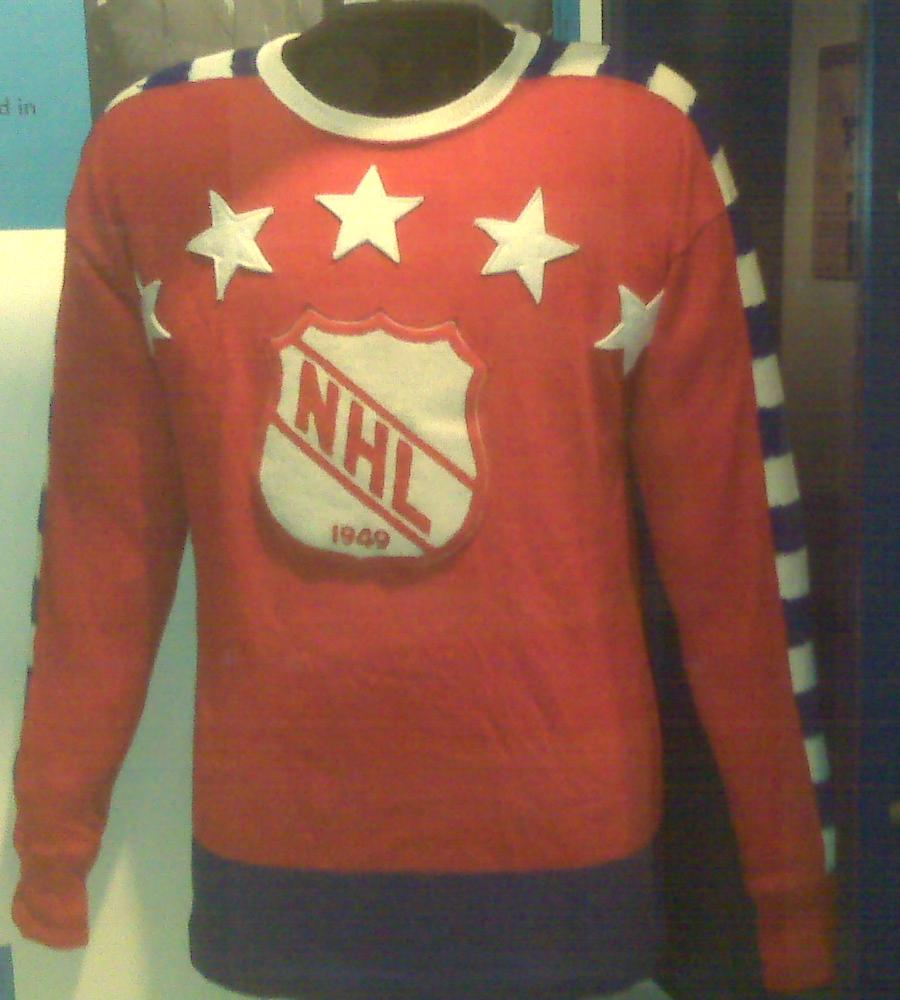
Jersey worn by Maurice Richard during the game.

== The game ==
=== Game summary ===
	NHL All-Stars	Toronto Maple Leafs
Final score	3	1
Scoring summary	Goldham (Laprade), 18:03 1st (SHG); Ronty (Goldham), 14:42 2nd (PPG); D. Bentley (Quackenbush), 2:38 3rd (PPG)	Barilko (Watson, Gardner), 15:22 1st
Penalties	Richard, 1st; Howe, 1st; Harmon, 2nd; Egan, 2nd	Meeker, 1st; Thomson, 1st; Thomson, 2nd; Boesch, 2nd; Smith, 2nd
Win/loss	W - Charlie Rayner	L - Turk Broda

- Referee: Bill Chadwick
- Linesmen: Ed Mepham, Jim Primeau

Source: Podnieks

== Rosters ==
	NHL All-Stars	Toronto Maple Leafs
Head coach	Tommy Ivan (Detroit Red Wings)	Hap Day (Toronto Maple Leafs)
Lineup	Starting lineup: 1 - G Bill Durnan (Montreal Canadiens)^{1}; 1 - G Charlie Rayner (New York Rangers)^{2}; 2 - D Jack Stewart (Detroit Red Wings)^{1}; 3 - D Bob Goldham (Chicago Black Hawks); 4 - D Pat Egan (New York Rangers); 5 - C Buddy O'Connor (New York Rangers); 6 - LW Roy Conacher (Chicago Black Hawks)^{1}; 7 - LW Doug Bentley (Chicago Black Hawks)^{2}; 8 - RW Bill Mosienko (Chicago Black Hawks); 9 - RW Maurice Richard (Montreal Canadiens)^{1}; 10 - C Edgar Laprade (New York Rangers); 11 - D Bill Quackenbush (Boston Bruins)^{1}; 12 - C Sid Abel (Detroit Red Wings)^{1}; 14 - RW Gordie Howe (Detroit Red Wings)^{2}; 15 - D Glen Harmon (Montreal Canadiens)^{2}; 16 - LW Ted Lindsay (Detroit Red Wings)^{2}; 17 - D Ken Reardon (Montreal Canadiens)^{2}; 18 - LW Tony Leswick (New York Rangers); 20 - C Paul Ronty (Boston Bruins)	Starting lineup: 1 - G Turk Broda; 2 - D Jimmy Thomson; 4 - LW Harry Watson; 5 - D Garth Boesch; 7 - C Max Bentley; 8 - LW Joe Klukay; 9 - C Ted Kennedy, C; 11 - RW Howie Meeker; 14 - D Vic Lynn; 16 - C Fleming Mackell; 17 - C Cal Gardner; 18 - D Bill Juzda; 19 - D Bill Barilko; 22 - LW Ray Timgren; 23 - D Bob Dawes; 24 - LW Sid Smith

Source: Podnieks

Notes

- ^1 Named to the first All-Star team in 1948–49.
- ^2 Named to the second All-Star team in 1948–49.
