= 8th National Hockey League All-Star Game =

Professional ice hockey exhibition game

8th NHL All-Star Game
	1	2	3	Total
All-Star team	0	2	0	2
Detroit Red Wings	2	0	0	2
- Date: October 2, 1954
- Arena: Detroit Olympia
- City: Detroit
- Attendance: 10,689

The 8th National Hockey League All-Star Game took place at the Detroit Olympia, home of the Detroit Red Wings, on October 2, 1954. The Red Wings, winner of the 1954 Stanley Cup Finals, played a team of All-Stars, with the game ending in a 2–2 tie.

== Game summary ==
	NHL All-Stars	Detroit Red Wings
Final score	2	2
Head coach	King Clancy (Toronto Maple Leafs)	Jimmy Skinner (Detroit Red Wings)
Lineup	Starting lineup: 1 - G Harry Lumley (Toronto Maple Leafs); 1 - G Al Rollins (Chicago Black Hawks); 2 - D Doug Harvey (Montreal Canadiens); 3 - D Gus Mortson (Chicago Black Hawks); 4 - D Bill Gadsby (Chicago Black Hawks); 5 - RW Bernie Geoffrion (Montreal Canadiens); 6 - C Fleming Mackell (Boston Bruins); 8 - LW Sid Smith (Toronto Maple Leafs); 9 - RW Maurice Richard (Montreal Canadiens); 10 - D Harry Howell (New York Rangers); 11 - D Bill Quackenbush (Boston Bruins); 12 - C Ted Kennedy (Toronto Maple Leafs); 14 - C Jean Beliveau (Montreal Canadiens); 15 - LW Ed Sandford (Boston Bruins); 16 - C Don Raleigh (New York Rangers); 17 - C Ken Mosdell (Montreal Canadiens); 18 - D Tim Horton (Toronto Maple Leafs); 20 - C Paul Ronty (New York Rangers); 23 - LW Doug Mohns (Boston Bruins)	Starting lineup: 1 - G Terry Sawchuk; 2 - D Bob Goldham; 3 - D Marcel Pronovost; 4 - D Red Kelly; 5 - D Benny Woit; 7 - LW Ted Lindsay, C; 8 - LW Tony Leswick; 9 - RW Gordie Howe; 10 - C Metro Prystai; 11 - LW Marty Pavelich; 12 - C Glen Skov; 14 - C Earl Reibel; 15 - C Alex Delvecchio; 16 - LW Johnny Wilson; 17 - RW Bill Dineen; 18 - D Keith Allen; 19 - C Don Poile; 20 - LW Marcel Bonin
Scoring summary	Mortson (Gadsby, Kennedy), 4:19 2nd (PPG); Mohns (Beliveau), 13:10 2nd	Delvecchio (Lindsay, Reibel), 9:50 1st (PPG); Howe (Reibel, Kelly), 19:55 1st (PPG)
Penalties	Mortson, 1:37 1st; Mackell, 8:30 1st; Howell, 18:03 1st; Horton, 18:26 1st; Howell, 7:53 2nd; Sandford, 13:27 2nd; Mohns, 19:51 2nd; Mortson, 3:57 3rd	Bonin, 5:48 1st; Bonin, 13:18 1st; Dineen, 4:01 2nd; Bonin, 7:53 2nd; Lindsay, 1:09 3rd; Wld, 9:09 3rd
Win/loss	T - Harry Lumley	T - Terry Sawchuck

- Referee: Bill Chadwick
- Linesmen: George Hayes, Doug Young

== Notes ==
- ^1 Named to the first All-Star team in 1953–54.
- ^2 Named to the second All-Star team in 1953–54.
