= Bob Dawes =

Canadian ice hockey player (1924–2003)

- Born: November 29, 1924 Saskatoon, Saskatchewan, Canada
- Died: May 26, 2003 (aged 78) Saskatoon, Saskatchewan, Canada
- Height: 6 ft 1 in (185 cm)
- Weight: 170 lb (77 kg; 12 st 2 lb)
- Position: Defence
- Shot: Left
- Played for: Montreal Canadiens; Toronto Maple Leafs
- Playing career: 1945–1967

Robert James "Bobby" Dawes (November 29, 1924 – May 26, 2003) was a Canadian ice hockey defenceman. He played 32 games in the National Hockey League with the Toronto Maple Leafs and Montreal Canadiens between 1947 and 1951. The rest of his career, which lasted from 1945 to 1967, was spent in various minor leagues. He won the Stanley Cup in 1949 with the Maple Leafs.

== Playing career ==
Dawes began his National Hockey League career with the Toronto Maple Leafs in 1947. He would also play for the Montreal Canadiens. He left the NHL following the 1951 season and played in the minor leagues until 1961–62 before retiring from hockey. He won the Stanley Cup in 1949 with the Maple Leafs.

== Career statistics ==
=== Regular season and playoffs ===
			Regular season					Playoffs
Season	Team	League	GP	G	A	Pts	PIM	GP	G	A	Pts	PIM
1942–43	Saskatoon Quakers	N-SJHL	7	7	6	13	20	3	1	1	4	—
1942–43	Saskatoon Quakers	M-Cup	—	—	—	—	—	8	4	8	12	4
1943–44	Oshawa Generals	OHA	26	8	19	27	32	10	2	4	6	4
1943–44	Oshawa Generals	M-Cup	—	—	—	—	—	9	5	7	12	14
1944–45	Saskatoon Falcons	N-SJHL	2	2	3	5	0	—	—	—	—	—
1945–46	New Haven Eagles	AHL	57	9	18	27	33	—	—	—	—	—
1946–47	Toronto Maple Leafs	NHL	1	0	0	0	0	—	—	—	—	—
1946–47	Springfield Indians	AHL	42	4	17	21	27	2	0	2	2	0
1947–48	Pittsburgh Hornets	AHL	68	13	31	44	35	2	1	1	2	5
1948–49	Toronto Maple Leafs	NHL	5	1	0	1	0	9	0	0	0	2
1948–49	Pittsburgh Hornets	AHL	55	16	25	51	31	—	—	—	—	—
1949–50	Toronto Maple Leafs	NHL	11	1	2	3	2	—	—	—	—	—
1949–50	Cleveland Barons	AHL	47	3	19	22	41	9	1	3	4	10
1950–51	Buffalo Bisons	AHL	10	2	3	5	6	—	—	—	—	—
1950–51	Cincinnati Mohawks	AHL	15	4	3	7	4	—	—	—	—	—
1950–51	Seattle Ironmen	PCHL	20	2	11	13	10	—	—	—	—	—
1950–51	Montreal Canadiens	NHL	15	0	5	5	4	1	0	0	0	0
1951–52	Montreal Royals	QSHL	5	0	0	0	2	—	—	—	—	—
1951–52	Buffalo Bisons	AHL	2	0	3	3	0	—	—	—	—	—
1952–53	Montreal Royals	QSHL	—	—	—	—	—	—	—	—	—	—
1953–54	Sudbury Wolves	NOHA	19	2	10	12	4	10	0	5	5	4
1954–55	New Westminster Royals	WHL	12	3	3	6	2	—	—	—	—	—
1954–55	Kelowna Packers	OSHL	51	12	23	35	34	4	1	3	4	0
1955–56	New Westminster Royals	WHL	56	8	25	33	47	4	2	1	3	0
1956–57	Kamloops Chiefs	OSHL	54	4	42	46	52	12	5	6	11	15
1957–58	Kamloops Chiefs	OSHL	48	11	35	46	36	15	0	5	5	2
1958–59	Johnstown Jets	EHL	37	14	23	37	24	12	4	6	10	8
1959–60	Johnstown Jets	EHL	50	19	40	59	8	13	0	12	12	9
1960–61	Johnstown Jets	EHL	56	12	26	38	12	11	4	7	11	2
1961–62	Johnstown Jets	EHL	68	16	30	46	24	13	6	8	14	2
1962–63	Saskatoon Quakers	SSHL	27	12	23	35	14	6	2	7	9	2
1963–64	Saskatoon Quakers	SSHL	8	8	12	20	0	11	4	4	8	4
1963–64	Saskatoon Quakers	Al-Cup	—	—	—	—	—	6	0	1	1	4
1964–65	Yorkton Terriers	SSHL	2	0	2	2	2	11	0	3	3	12
1965–66	Yorkton Terriers	SSHL	—	—	—	—	—	—	—	—	—	—
1966–67	Saskatoon Quakers	SSHL	16	2	11	13	4	14	1	9	10	2
AHL totals			296	51	129	180	177	13	2	6	8	15
NHL totals			32	2	7	9	6	10	0	0	0	2
