= 4th National Hockey League All-Star Game =

Professional ice hockey exhibition game

4th NHL All-Star Game
	1	2	3	Total
All-Stars	0	0	1	1
Detroit Red Wings	2	3	2	7
- Date: October 8, 1950
- Arena: Detroit Olympia
- City: Detroit
- Attendance: 9,166

The 4th National Hockey League All-Star Game took place at the Detroit Olympia, home of the Detroit Red Wings, on October 8, 1950. The Red Wings defeated a team of NHL all stars, 7–1.

== The game ==
Only 9,166 people attended the game, making it is the smallest attendance figure in All-Star Game history. Ted Lindsay of the Red Wings scored the first hat trick in an All-Star Game, as the Red Wings won 7–1.

=== Game summary ===
	NHL All-Stars	Detroit Red Wings
Final score	1	7
Scoring summary	Smith (Peirson), 18:27 3rd	Lindsay (Howe), 0:19 1st; Lindsay (Abel), 17:12 1st (PPG); Howe (Lindsay, Kelly), 11:12 2nd; Peters (Kelly, Prystai), 18:36 2nd; Pavelich (Prystai, Peters), 19:44 2nd; Prystai (Pavelich), 7:36 3rd; Lindsay (unassisted), 14:28 3rd (SHG)
Penalties	Richard, 7:57 1st; Lewsick, 9:09 1st; Bentley, 15:13 1st; Leswick, 16:54 1st	Abel, 9:15 1st; Pronovost, 11:45 1st; Couture, 4:30 2nd; Team (too many men; served by Peters), 5:03, 3rd; G. Stewart, 13:10, 3rd
Win/loss	L - Turk Broda	W - Terry Sawchuk

- Referee: George Gravel
- Linesmen: George Young, Doug Young

== Rosters ==
	NHL All-Stars	Detroit Red Wings
Head coach	Lynn Patrick (Boston Bruins)	Tommy Ivan (Detroit Red Wings)
Lineup	Starting lineup: 1 - G Turk Broda (Toronto Maple Leafs); 1 - G Charlie Rayner (New York Rangers)^{2}; 2 - D Jack Stewart (Chicago Black Hawks); 3 - D Gus Mortson (Toronto Maple Leafs)^{1}; 4 - D Jim Thomson (Toronto Maple Leafs); 5 - D Glen Harmon (Montreal Canadiens); 6 - D Butch Bouchard (Montreal Canadiens); 7 - LW Doug Bentley (Chicago Black Hawks); 8 - RW Bill Mosienko (Chicago Black Hawks); 9 - RW Maurice Richard (Montreal Canadiens); 10 - C Edgar Laprade (New York Rangers); 11 - D Bill Quackenbush (Boston Bruins); 12 - C Ted Kennedy (Toronto Maple Leafs)^{2}; 18 - LW Tony Leswick (New York Rangers)^{2}; 20 - C Paul Ronty (Boston Bruins); 23 - RW Johnny Peirson (Boston Bruins); 24 - LW Sid Smith (Toronto Maple Leafs)	Starting lineup: 1 - G Terry Sawchuk; 2 - D Bob Goldham; 4 - D Red Kelly^{2}; 5 - D Leo Reise^{2}; 7 - LW Ted Lindsay^{1}; 8 - C George Gee; 9 - RW Gordie Howe^{2}; 10 - RW Jimmy Peters; 11 - LW Gaye Stewart; 12 - C Sid Abel^{1}, C; 14 - C Metro Prystai; 15 - LW Marty Pavelich; 16 - C Jim McFadden; 17 - RW Joe Carveth; 18 - C Gerry Couture; 19 - LW Steve Black; 21 - D Lee Fogolin Sr.; 22 - D Marcel Pronovost

Notes

- ^1 Named to the first All-Star team in 1949–50.
- ^2 Named to the second All-Star team in 1949–50.
