= 2nd National Hockey League All-Star Game =

Professional ice hockey exhibition game

2nd NHL All-Star Game
	1	2	3	Total
All-Stars	0	3	0	3
Toronto Maple Leafs	0	1	0	1
- Date: November 3, 1948
- Arena: Chicago Stadium
- City: Chicago
- Attendance: 12,794

The 2nd National Hockey League All-Star Game took place at Chicago Stadium, home of the Chicago Black Hawks, on November 3, 1948. For the second year in a row, the game saw the Toronto Maple Leafs play a team of NHL all-stars. The All-Stars won the game 3–1.

== Game summary ==
	NHL All-Stars	Toronto Maple Leafs
Final score	3	1
Scoring summary	Lindsay (Richard, Lach), 1:35 2nd; Dumart (unassisted), 3:06 2nd (GWG); G. Stewart (D. Bentley), 19:32 2nd (PPG)	M. Bentley (Costello), 5:13 2nd
Penalties	Reardon, 1st; Howe, major 2nd; J. Stewart, 2nd; Bouchard, 2nd; Bouchard, 3rd	Ezinicki, 1st; Mortson, major 2nd; Juzda, 2nd
Win/loss	W - Frank Brimsek	L - Turk Broda

- Referee: Bill Chadwick
- Linesmen: Sammy Babcock, Mush March

== Rosters ==
	NHL All-Stars	Toronto Maple Leafs
Head coach	(Canada) Tommy Ivan (Detroit Red Wings)	(Canada) Hap Day (Toronto Maple Leafs)
Lineup	Starting lineup: (United States) 0 - G Frank Brimsek (Boston Bruins)^{2}; (Canada) 1 - G Bill Durnan (Montreal Canadiens); (Canada) 2 - D Jack Stewart (Detroit Red Wings)^{1}; (Canada) 3 - D Bill Quackenbush (Detroit Red Wings)^{1}; (Canada) 4 - D Butch Bouchard (Montreal Canadiens); (Canada) 6 - D Neil Colville (New York Rangers)^{2}; (Canada) 7 - LW Ted Lindsay (Detroit Red Wings)^{1}; (Canada) 8 - LW Doug Bentley (Chicago Black Hawks); (Canada) 9 - RW Maurice Richard (Montreal Canadiens)^{1}; (Canada) 10 - C Edgar Laprade (New York Rangers); (Canada) 11 - RW Gordie Howe (Detroit Red Wings); (Canada) 12 - LW Gaye Stewart (Chicago Black Hawks)^{2}; (Canada) 14 - LW Woody Dumart (Boston Bruins); (Canada) 15 - C Milt Schmidt (Boston Bruins); (Canada) 16 - C Elmer Lach (Montreal Canadiens)^{1}; (Canada) 17 - D Ken Reardon (Montreal Canadiens)^{2}; (Canada) 18 - LW Tony Leswick (New York Rangers); (Canada) 19 - RW Bud Poile (Chicago Black Hawks)^{2}	Starting lineup: (Canada) 1 - G Turk Broda^{1}; (Canada) 2 - D Jimmy Thomson; (Canada) 3 - D Gus Mortson; (Canada) 4 - LW Harry Watson; (Canada) 5 - D Garth Boesch; (Canada) 7 - C Max Bentley; (Canada) 8 - LW Joe Klukay; (Canada) 9 - C Ted Kennedy, C; (Canada) 11 - RW Howie Meeker; (Canada) 12 - RW Bill Ezinicki; (Canada) 14 - D Vic Lynn; (Canada) 15 - LW Les Costello; (Canada) 16 - C Fleming Mackell; (Canada) 17 - C Cal Gardner; (Canada) 18 - D Bill Juzda; (Canada) 19 - D Bill Barilko; (Canada) 20 - D Frank Mathers

Notes

- ^1Named to the first All-Star team in 1947–48.
- ^2Named to the second All-Star team in 1947–48.
