= List of Chicago Blackhawks broadcasters =

The following is a list of television and radio broadcasters from the Chicago Blackhawks National Hockey League (NHL) team by decade.

== Television ==
=== 2020s ===
Year	Channel	Play-by-play	Color commentator	Rinkside reporter	Studio host	Studio analyst(s)
2025–26	Chicago Sports Network	Rick Ball	Darren Pang (primary); Caley Chelios (select games during Pang's NHL on TNT assignments)	Luke Stuckmeyer	Pat Boyle	Caley Chelios and Tony Granato
2024–25	Chicago Sports Network	Rick Ball	Darren Pang (primary); Caley Chelios (select games during Pang's NHL on TNT assignments)	Luke Stuckmeyer	Pat Boyle	Caley Chelios and Tony Granato
2023–24	NBC Sports Chicago	Chris Vosters (primary); Brendan Burke (Sabres vs Blackhawks only)	Darren Pang (primary); Caley Chelios (select games during Pang's NHL on TNT assignments); Troy Murray (select games during Pang's NHL on TNT assignments)	Luke Stuckmeyer	Pat Boyle, Caley Chelios, or Genna Rose	Caley Chelios, Chris Chelios, Denis Savard, Tony Granato, and John Scott
2022–23	NBC Sports Chicago	Chris Vosters	Troy Murray (select games); Patrick Sharp (select games); Colby Cohen (select games); Caley Chelios (select games)	Luke Stuckmeyer	Pat Boyle, Caley Chelios, or Genna Rose	Caley Chelios, Colby Cohen, Patrick Sharp, and Scott Darling
2021–22	NBC Sports Chicago	Pat Foley (primary); John Wiedeman (select games); Mike Monaco (select games); Stephen Nelson (select games); Chris Vosters (select games); Jason Ross, Jr. (select games); Alan Fuehring (select games); Ralph Strangis (select games)	Eddie Olczyk (primary); Colby Cohen (select games during Olczyk's NHL on TNT assignments); Caley Chelios (select games); Nick Olczyk (select games); Patrick Sharp (select games); Dale Tallon (select games)	Luke Stuckmeyer	Pat Boyle, Caley Chelios, or Genna Rose	Adam Burish, Colin Fraser, Caley Chelios, Patrick Sharp, and Andrew Shaw
2021	NBC Sports Chicago	Pat Foley	Eddie Olczyk or Steve Konroyd	Luke Stuckmeyer	Pat Boyle or Adam Burish	Steve Konroyd, Jamal Mayers, and Patrick Sharp

=== 2010s ===
Year	Channel	Play-by-play	Color commentator	Rinkside reporter	Studio host	Studio analyst(s)
2019–2020	NBC Sports Chicago	Pat Foley	Eddie Olczyk or Steve Konroyd	Luke Stuckmeyer	Pat Boyle or Adam Burish	Steve Konroyd, Jamal Mayers, and Patrick Sharp
2018–19	NBC Sports Chicago	Pat Foley	Eddie Olczyk or Steve Konroyd	Luke Stuckmeyer (NBC Sports Chicago)	Pat Boyle (NBC Sports Chicago)	Steve Konroyd and Jamal Mayers
2018–19	WGN-TV	Pat Foley	Eddie Olczyk or Steve Konroyd	Dan Roan (WGN)		Steve Konroyd and Jamal Mayers
2017–18	NBC Sports Chicago	Pat Foley	Eddie Olczyk or Steve Konroyd	Luke Stuckmeyer (NBC Sports Chicago)	Pat Boyle (NBC Sports Chicago)	Steve Konroyd and Jamal Mayers
2017–18	WGN-TV	Pat Foley	Eddie Olczyk or Steve Konroyd	Dan Roan (WGN)		Steve Konroyd and Jamal Mayers
2016–17	NBC Sports Chicago	Pat Foley	Eddie Olczyk or Steve Konroyd	Luke Stuckmeyer (NBC Sports Chicago)	Pat Boyle (NBC Sports Chicago)	Steve Konroyd and Jamal Mayers
2016–17	WGN-TV	Pat Foley	Eddie Olczyk or Steve Konroyd	Dan Roan (WGN)		Steve Konroyd and Jamal Mayers
2015–16	NBC Sports Chicago	Pat Foley	Eddie Olczyk or Steve Konroyd	Luke Stuckmeyer (NBC Sports Chicago)	Pat Boyle (NBC Sports Chicago)	Steve Konroyd and Jamal Mayers
2015–16	WGN-TV	Pat Foley	Eddie Olczyk or Steve Konroyd	Dan Roan (WGN)		Steve Konroyd and Jamal Mayers
2014–15	NBC Sports Chicago	Pat Foley	Eddie Olczyk or Steve Konroyd	Luke Stuckmeyer (NBC Sports Chicago)	Pat Boyle (NBC Sports Chicago)	Steve Konroyd and Jamal Mayers
2014–15	WGN-TV	Pat Foley	Eddie Olczyk or Steve Konroyd	Dan Roan (WGN)		Steve Konroyd and Jamal Mayers
2013–14	NBC Sports Chicago	Pat Foley	Eddie Olczyk or Steve Konroyd	Luke Stuckmeyer (NBC Sports Chicago)	Pat Boyle (NBC Sports Chicago)	Steve Konroyd and Denis Savard
2013–14	WGN-TV	Pat Foley	Eddie Olczyk or Steve Konroyd	Dan Roan (WGN)		Steve Konroyd and Denis Savard
2012–13	NBC Sports Chicago	Pat Foley	Eddie Olczyk or Steve Konroyd	Susannah Collins (NBC Sports Chicago)	Pat Boyle (NBC Sports Chicago)	Steve Konroyd and Denis Savard
2012–13	WGN-TV	Pat Foley	Eddie Olczyk or Steve Konroyd	Dan Roan (WGN)		Steve Konroyd and Denis Savard
2011–12	NBC Sports Chicago	Pat Foley	Eddie Olczyk or Steve Konroyd	Sarah Kustok (NBC Sports Chicago)	Chris Boden (NBC Sports Chicago)	Steve Konroyd and Denis Savard
2011–12	WGN-TV	Pat Foley	Eddie Olczyk or Steve Konroyd		Dan Roan (WGN)	Steve Konroyd and Denis Savard
2010–11	NBC Sports Chicago	Pat Foley	Eddie Olczyk or Steve Konroyd		Chris Boden (NBC Sports Chicago)	Steve Konroyd and Denis Savard
2010–11	WGN-TV	Pat Foley	Eddie Olczyk or Steve Konroyd		Dan Roan (WGN)	Steve Konroyd and Denis Savard

=== 2000s ===
Year	Channel	Play-by-play	Color commentator(s)	Studio host	Studio analyst(s)
2009–10	NBC Sports Chicago	Pat Foley	Eddie Olczyk or Steve Konroyd	Chris Boden (NBC Sports Chicago)	Steve Konroyd and Troy Murray
2009–10	WGN-TV	Pat Foley	Eddie Olczyk or Steve Konroyd	Dan Roan (WGN)	Steve Konroyd and Troy Murray
2008–09	NBC Sports Chicago	Pat Foley	Eddie Olczyk or Steve Konroyd	Josh Mora (NBC Sports Chicago)	Steve Konroyd and Troy Murray
2008–09	WGN-TV	Pat Foley	Eddie Olczyk or Steve Konroyd	Dan Roan (WGN)	Steve Konroyd and Troy Murray
2007–08	NBC Sports Chicago	Dan P. Kelly	Eddie Olczyk or Steve Konroyd	Josh Mora, Chuck Garfien, or Chris Boden	Steve Konroyd and Troy Murray
2006–07	NBC Sports Chicago	Dan P. Kelly	Eddie Olczyk or Steve Konroyd	Jim Blaney	Steve Konroyd and Troy Murray
2005–06	NBC Sports Chicago	Pat Foley	Troy Murray	Jim Blaney	
2003–04	Fox Sports Net Chicago	Pat Foley	Troy Murray	Jim Blaney	
2002–03	Fox Sports Net Chicago	Pat Foley	Dale Tallon		Troy Murray
2001–02	Fox Sports Net Chicago	Pat Foley	Bill Gardner		Troy Murray
2000–01	Fox Sports Net Chicago	Pat Foley	Bill Gardner		Troy Murray

=== 1990s ===
Year	Channel	Play-by-play	Color commentator	Studio host	Studio analyst(s)
1999–2000	Fox Sports Net Chicago	Pat Foley	Bill Gardner	Brian Davis	Troy Murray
1998–99	Fox Sports Net Chicago	Pat Foley	Bill Gardner	Chet Coppock	Troy Murray
1997–98	Fox Sports Net Chicago	Pat Foley	Dale Tallon	Chet Coppock	Murray Bannerman
1996–97	SportsChannel Chicago	Pat Foley	Dale Tallon	Jim Blaney	Murray Bannerman
1995–96	SportsChannel Chicago	Pat Foley	Dale Tallon	Jim Blaney	Bill Gardner
1994–95	Hawkvision (home games)	Pat Foley	Dale Tallon	Jim Blaney	Bill Gardner and Darren Pang
1994–95	SportsChannel Chicago (road games)	Pat Foley	Dale Tallon	Jim Blaney	Bill Gardner and Darren Pang
1993–94	Hawkvision (home games)	Pat Foley	Dale Tallon	Jim Blaney	Bill Gardner and Darren Pang
1993–94	SportsChannel Chicago (road games)	Pat Foley	Dale Tallon	Jim Blaney	Bill Gardner and Darren Pang
1992–93	Hawkvision (home games)	Pat Foley	Dale Tallon	Jim Blaney	Bill Gardner and Darren Pang
1992–93	SportsChannel Chicago (road games)	Pat Foley	Dale Tallon	Jim Blaney	Bill Gardner and Darren Pang
1991–92	SportsChannel Chicago	Pat Foley	Dale Tallon	Jim Blaney	Bill Gardner and Darren Pang
1991–92	Hawkvision (playoff home games)	Pat Foley	Dale Tallon	Jim Blaney	Bill Gardner and Darren Pang
1990–91	SportsChannel Chicago	Pat Foley	Dale Tallon	Jim Blaney	Bill Gardner

=== 1980s ===
Year	Channel	Play-by-play	Color commentator	Studio host	Studio analyst
1989–90	SportsChannel Chicago	Pat Foley	Dale Tallon	Jim Blaney	Bill Gardner
1988–89	SportsChannel Chicago	Pat Foley	Dale Tallon		
1987–88	SportsChannel Chicago	Pat Foley	Dale Tallon		
1986–87	SportsChannel Chicago	Pat Foley	Dale Tallon		
1985–86	SportsChannel Chicago	Pat Foley	Dale Tallon		
1984–85	SportsChannel Chicago	Pat Foley	Dale Tallon		
1983–84	Sportsvision	Ken Wilson	Dale Tallon		
1982–83	Sportsvision	Ken Wilson	Dale Tallon		
1981–82	ONTV	Pat Foley	Keith Magnuson		
1980–81	ONTV	Pat Foley			

==== Note ====
Keith Magnuson only did color commentary during the 1982 playoffs.

=== 1970s ===
Year	Channel	Play-by-play	Color commentator(s)	Studio host
1979–80	WSNS-TV	Andy MacWilliams or Bud Kelly	Lou Angotti	
1978–79	WSNS-TV	Andy MacWilliams or Bud Kelly	Bud Kelly or Lou Angotti	
1977–78	WFLD	Ron Oakes	Lou Angotti	
1976–77	WFLD	Jim West	Lou Angotti	
1975–76	WFLD	Lloyd Pettit		Brad Palmer
1974–75	WGN-TV	Jim West		
1973–74	WGN-TV	Jim West		
1972–73	WGN-TV	Jim West		
1971–72	WGN-TV	Jim West		
1970–71	WGN-TV	Jim West		

==== Note ====
As mentioned to up above, Brad Palmer served as the intermission host, while working for WFLD-TV 32 in 1975–76. When the NHL '76 TV series did playoff games, Marv Albert split play-by-play duties with an announcer from one of the participating teams. For instance, on April 18, 1976 (Montreal at Chicago), it was Palmer who split the play-by-play duties with Albert. Albert did play-by-play for the first and third periods while did Palmer the second. Lloyd Pettit of course, was unavailable as he was doing radio (as it turned out for the last time) on WMAQ.

Dan Kelly provided play-by-play for the Black Hawks during the 1978 playoffs. Kelly had become available because St. Louis missed the playoffs. Chicago Tribune beat writer Bob Verdi was the analyst.

=== 1960s ===
Year	Channel	Play-by-play	Color commentator
1969–70	WGN-TV	Lloyd Pettit	
1968–69	WGN-TV	Lloyd Pettit	
1967–68	WGN-TV	Lloyd Pettit	
1966–67	WGN-TV	Lloyd Pettit	
1965–66	WGN-TV	Lloyd Pettit	
1964–65	WGN-TV	Lloyd Pettit	
1963–64	WGN-TV	Lloyd Pettit	
1962–63	WGN-TV	Johnny Gottselig	Lloyd Pettit
1961–62	WGN-TV	Joe Wilson	Lloyd Pettit

=== 1950s ===
Year	Channel	Play-by-play
1952–53	WBKB	Joe Wilson

=== 1940s ===
Year	Channel	Play-by-play
1948–49	WBKB	Joe Wilson
1947–48	WBKB	Joe Wilson

==== Note ====
From 1946–49, Joe Wilson called a limited schedule of Sunday home games.

== Radio ==
=== 2020s ===
Year	Flagship	Play-by-play	Color commentator(s)	Studio host
2025–26	WGN	John Wiedeman	Troy Murray (primary); Steve Konroyd (select games)	Chris Boden
2024–25	WGN	John Wiedeman	Troy Murray (primary); Caley Chelios (select games)	Chris Boden
2023–24	WGN	John Wiedeman	Troy Murray (primary); Caley Chelios (select games); Joe Brand (select games)	Chris Boden
2022–23	WGN	John Wiedeman	Troy Murray (select games); Colby Cohen (select games when Murray is doing TV); Caley Chelios (select games when Murray is doing TV)	Chris Boden
2021–22	WGN	John Wiedeman (primary); Alan Fuehring (when Wiedeman is doing TV); Joey Zakrzewski (when Wiedeman is doing TV); Jason Ross, Jr. (when Wiedeman is doing TV)	Troy Murray (primary); Colby Cohen (select games); Caley Chelios (select games); Paul Caponigri (select games); Nick Olczyk (select games); Joe Brand (select games)	Chris Boden
2021	WGN	John Wiedeman	Troy Murray	Chris Boden

=== 2010s ===
Year	Flagship	Play-by-play	Color commentator(s)	Studio host
2019–20	WGN	John Wiedeman	Troy Murray	Chris Boden
2018–19	WGN	John Wiedeman	Troy Murray	Chris Boden
2017–18	WGN	John Wiedeman	Troy Murray	Chris Boden
2016–17	WGN	John Wiedeman	Troy Murray	Judd Sirott
2015–16	WGN	John Wiedeman	Troy Murray	Judd Sirott
2014–15	WGN	John Wiedeman	Troy Murray	Judd Sirott
2013–14	WGN	John Wiedeman	Troy Murray	Judd Sirott
2012–13	WGN	John Wiedeman	Troy Murray	Judd Sirott
2011–12	WGN	John Wiedeman	Troy Murray	Judd Sirott
2010–11	WGN	John Wiedeman	Troy Murray	Judd Sirott

==== 2000s ====
Year	Flagship	Play-by-play	Color commentator(s)	Studio host	Studio analyst
2008–09	WGN	John Wiedeman	Troy Murray	Judd Sirott	
2007–08	WSCR	John Wiedeman	Troy Murray	Jesse Rogers	
2006–07	WSCR	John Wiedeman	Troy Murray	Jesse Rogers	
2005–06	WSCR	Pat Foley	Troy Murray	Jesse Rogers	
2003–04	WSCR	Pat Foley	Troy Murray	Jesse Rogers	
2002–03	WSCR	Pat Foley	Dale Tallon	Jesse Rogers	Bob Probert
2001–02	WSCR	Pat Foley	Bill Gardner	Jesse Rogers	
2000–01	WSCR	Pat Foley	Bill Gardner	Jesse Rogers	

==== 1990s ====
Year	Flagship	Play-by-play	Color commentator(s)	Studio host	Studio analyst
1999–2000	WMAQ	Pat Foley	Bill Gardner	Jim Blaney	
1998–99	WMAQ	Pat Foley	Bill Gardner	Dave Pasch	
1997–98	WMAQ	Pat Foley	Dale Tallon	Dave Pasch	Billy Jaffe
1996–97	WMVP	Pat Foley	Dale Tallon	Brian Davis	
1995–96	WMVP	Pat Foley	Dale Tallon	Brian Davis	
1994–95	WMVP	Pat Foley	Dale Tallon	Brian Davis	
1993–94	WMVP	Pat Foley	Dale Tallon	Brian Davis	
1992–93	WLUP	Pat Foley	Dale Tallon	Darren Pang	
1991–92	WBBM	Pat Foley	Dale Tallon	Darren Pang	
1990–91	WBBM	Pat Foley	Dale Tallon	Darren Pang	

==== 1980s ====
Year	Flagship	Play-by-play	Color commentator(s)
1989–90	WBBM	Pat Foley	Dale Tallon
1988–89	WBBM	Pat Foley	Dale Tallon
1987–88	WBBM	Pat Foley	Dale Tallon
1986–87	WBBM	Pat Foley	Dale Tallon
1985–86	WBBM	Pat Foley	Dale Tallon
1984–85	WIND	Pat Foley	Dale Tallon
1983–84	WIND	Pat Foley	
1982–83	WIND	Pat Foley	
1981–82	WIND	Pat Foley	Keith Magnuson
1980–81	WYEN	Pat Foley	

==== 1970s ====
Year	Flagship	Play-by-play	Color commentator(s)	Studio host	Studio analysts
1979–80	WCFL	Andy MacWilliams or Bud Kelly	Lou Angotti		
1978–79	WCFL	Andy MacWilliams or Bud Kelly	Bud Kelly or Lou Angotti		
1977–78	WCFL	Ron Oakes	Lou Angotti		
1976–77	WCFL	Jim West	Lou Angotti		
1975–76	WMAQ	Lloyd Pettit	Pat Sheridan		
1974–75	WMAQ	Lloyd Pettit or Jay Scott	Bob Elson		
1973–74	WMAQ	Lloyd Pettit or Jay Scott	Bob Elson		
1972–73	WMAQ	Lloyd Pettit or Jay Scott	Bob Elson		
1971–72	WMAQ	Lloyd Pettit, Harvey Wittenberg, or Jay Scott	Harvey Wittenberg		
1970–71	WMAQ	Lloyd Pettit, Harvey Wittenberg, or Jay Scott	Harvey Wittenberg or Jay Scott		

==== 1960s ====
Year	Flagship	Play-by-play
1969–70	WGN	Lloyd Pettit
1968–69	WGN	Lloyd Pettit
1967–68	WBBM	Rick Weaver
1966–67	WGN	Lloyd Pettit
1965–66	WGN	Lloyd Pettit
1964–65	WGN	Lloyd Pettit
1963–64	WGN	Joe Wilson
1962–63	WGN	Joe Wilson
1961–62	WGN	Joe Wilson
1960–61	WGN	Joe Wilson

==== 1950s ====
Year	Flagship	Play-by-play	Color commentator(s)
1959–60	WGN	Johnny Gottselig	Harvey Wittenberg
1958–59	WGN	Johnny Gottselig	
1954–55	WCFL	Bob Elson	Johnny Gottselig
1953–54	WCFL	Bob Elson	Johnny Gottselig
1952–53	WCFL	Bob Elson	Johnny Gottselig
1951–52	WCFL	Bert Wilson	Johnny Gottselig
1950–51	WCFL	Bob Elson	Johnny Gottselig

==== 1940s ====
Year	Flagship	Play-by-play	Color commentator(s)
1949–50	WCFL	Bob Elson	Johnny Gottselig
1948–49	WCFL	Bob Elson	Johnny Gottselig
1947–48	WIND	Bob Elson	John Carmichael
1946–47	WIND	Bob Elson	John Carmichael
1945–46	WIND	Bob Elson	John Carmichael
1944–45	WIND	Hal Totten	John Carmichael
1943–44	WIND	Hal Totten	John Carmichael
1942–43	WCFL	Hal Totten	John Carmichael
1941–42	WBBM	Hal Totten	John Carmichael
1940–41	WGN	Hal Totten	John Carmichael

==== 1920s & 1930s ====
Year	Flagship	Play-by-play
1939–40	WGN	Bob Elson
1938–39	WGN	Bob Elson
1937–38	WGN	Bob Elson
1936–37	WGN	Bob Elson
1935–36	WGN	Bob Elson
1934–35	WGN	Bob Elson
1933–34	WGN	John Harrington
1932–33	WIBO	Joe Springer
1931-32	WIBO	?
1930-31	WGES	?
1929-30	KYW	?
1928-29	KYW	?
1927–28	WLS	Bert "Cyclone" Johnson
1926-27	WLS	?

== Notes ==
- The Blackhawks were the last North American major league team (that is, in the NHL, NFL, NBA or MLB) to regularly broadcast home games (except for the handful of 1940's games telecast on WBKB, and the HawkVision experiment) after owner Bill Wirtz died in 2007.
- During the 1960's into the 1970's, the radio broadcasts were home games only (starting at 8:30 pm local, which usually meant only the second and third periods were broadcast), while only the away games were televised. This format would be amended for Stanley Cup matches, in which all games were radio broadcast in their entirety though only away games would be televised.
- Bud Kelly frequently filled in for Andy MacWilliams due to MacWilliams suffering from a throat condition.
- Keith Magnuson joined the broadcast team after he resigned as head coach.
- Lou Angotti was fired prior to the 1978–79 season, however, he was brought back in December 1978.
- Although the Blackhawks didn't have a permanent television color commentator from 1967 to 1975, Pettit and West were occasionally joined by WGN personalities including Arne Harris and Lou Boudreau. In fact, Boudreau was broadcasting a Hawks game in Oakland when he got word of his election to the Baseball Hall of Fame, at which time Lloyd Pettit congratulated him on air.
- ON TV sometimes showed sports vision games on the ON TV channel and in 1984 sports vision was on TV before the cable and satellite channel started (with the call letters WBBS, as a pay channel on channel 60).
- Prior to the 2006–07 season, if the game was shown on television, it was simulcast on radio, with the same announcers doing both broadcasts.
- In the spring of 1982, Gene Hart announced a Blackhawks/ Vancouver Canucks playoff game on WBBS-TV Chicago alongside Keith Magnuson. WBBS carried the game as Hart announced that the channel would become SportsVision on May 13 that year during a station ID
