= Brian Davis =

Brian Davis may refer to:

- Brian Davis (bishop) (1934–1998), New Zealand bishop
- Brian Davis (American football) (born 1963), American football player
- Brian Davis (basketball) (born 1970), American basketball player
- Brian Davis (golfer) (born 1974), English professional golfer
- Brian J. Davis (born 1953), Florida judge and federal judicial nominee
- Brian Joseph Davis (born 1975), Canadian artist and writer
- Brian Davis (diplomat) (died 2017), Canadian ambassador to Syria
- Brian Davis (sportscaster), broadcaster for the Oklahoma City Thunder
- Brian Davis (politician) (1934–2018), Australian politician
- Brian Golden Davis, American filmmaker and television director
- Brian Philip Davis (born 1981), film and television editor from Northern Ireland
- Brian Davis, character in 80,000 Suspects
- Brian Davis, minor character in Heroes
- Lead character in TV series What About Brian
- Narrator of TV series Sleep On It

== See also ==
- Brian Davies (disambiguation)
- Bryan Davis (disambiguation)
