= List of WHA broadcasters =

After CBS lost the American television rights of the National Hockey League to NBC following the 1971-72 season (CBS was paying less than $2 million a year and NBC jumped to $5.3 million), the network covered the inaugural season of the World Hockey Association. The WHA's TV deal permitted it to sell week‐night games to other networks (CBS meanwhile, would show games on Sunday afternoons in addition the all-star game and playoffs.)

On January 7, 1973, CBS aired its first WHA game between the Minnesota Fighting Saints and Winnipeg Jets live from the new St. Paul Civic Center with Ron Oakes, Gerry Cheevers and Dick Stockton announcing. Don Chevrier would also provide play-by-play for CBS. come the 1973 playoffs. CBS' contract

== Local broadcasters ==
Team	Radio station	Radio announcers	Television station	Television announcers
Baltimore Blades	WBAL-FM WBAL (AM)	Howard Mash		
Birmingham Bulls	WAPI	Eli Gold	WAPI-TV	Gary Sanders and Tom Roberts
Calgary Cowboys	CFAC	Eric Bishop	CFAC	Ed Whalen, Terry Jones and Wes Montgomery
Chicago Cougars	WJJD-FM WTAQ; WWMM-FM; WVFV-FM	Duane Dow Howard Balson, Bud Kelly	WSNS	Brad Palmer (1972–73), Red Rush (1973–75), and Bobby Hull
Cincinnati Stingers	WKRC WLW	Andy MacWilliams	WLWT; WXIX	Bill Brown Phil Samp and Jerry Rafter; Andy MacWilliams
Cleveland Crusaders	WWWE	Steve Albert (1972-75) and Lee Hamilton (1975-76)	WUAB	Frank Sweeney and Ted Patterson
Denver Spurs	KOA (AM)	Bob Martin		
Edmonton Oilers	CJCA CFRN (AM)	Bryan Hall and Rod Phillips	CITV/ITV CFRN	Wes Montgomery, Terry Jones and Ed Whalen; Al McCann and Bruce MacGregor
Houston Aeros	KLYX-FM KTRH	Jerry Trupiano	KRVL KHTV; KPRC-TV	Jerry Trupiano and Jack Stanfield
Indianapolis Racers	WIBC WART-FM; WNON-FM	Bob Lamey	WTTV	John Totten and Ron Buchanan
Los Angeles Sharks	KUTE-FM; KGBS-FM	Gary Morrell and Bud Tucker		
Michigan Stags	WWJ	Gary Morrell and Norm Plummer	WXON	Vince Doyle and Marty Pavelich
Minnesota Fighting Saints	WLOL	Frank Buetel, Roger Buxton, Bill Allard, and Bob Halvorson	WTCN	Frank Buetel and Roger Buxton
New England Whalers	WHDH; WTIC	Dave Martin, John Moynihan, Bill Rasmussen, Ron Ryan, Bob Neumeier, Dennis Randall, and John Hewig	WKBG; WFSB; Connecticut Public Television	John Carlson, Tim Horgan, Stan Fischler, Shirley Fischler, Bob Neumeier, Bill Rasmussen, Dennis Randall, and John Hewig
New York Raiders/Golden Blades	WMCA; WRVR	John Sterling and Fritz Peterson(both Raiders/WMCA) Barry Landers and Garry Peters (both Golden Blades/WRVR)	Sterling Manhattan Cable (predecessor to MSG Network)	
Ottawa Nationals	CKOY CJRC(French)	Professor Jack Daly and Hugh Riopelle Rene Lecavalier(French commentary)		
Philadelphia Blazers	WRCP-FM		WHYY-TV WPHL-TV (One playoff match)	Bob MacLean and Dan Baker
Phoenix Roadrunners	KTAR (AM) KXTC; KRUX	Al McCoy	KPHO	
Quebec Nordiques	CJRP CKCV (French only)	Claude Bédard, Jean Pouliot, Alain Côte, and Guy Lemieux, Paddy Pedneault, Marc Simoneau and Michel Villeneuve	CFCM(French only)	Jacques Moreau, Claude Bédard and Guy Lemieux
San Diego Mariners	KOGO	Roy Storey		
Toronto Toros	CFRB	William Stephenson	CKGN(Global TV)	Joe Spence, Peter Gzowski, Andy Bathgate, Jim Coleman and Brian MacFarlane
Vancouver Blazers	CJJC	Ron Oakes Gary Rable		
Winnipeg Jets	CJOB	Ken Nicholson and Don Wittman	CKND-TV	Don Wittman

=== Notes ===
- Chicago Bulls basketball began airing on channel 44 in 1973; WSNS-TV broadcast the Bulls' full 41-game road schedule, making the Bulls the only NBA team at the time with every road game broadcast on television. That same year, channel 44 began airing World Hockey Association hockey with the Chicago Cougars. The Cougars and Bulls were called by Lorn Brown.
- In 1974, Bill Rasmussen moved south to Hartford, Connecticut, to join the New England Whalers of the World Hockey Association as their communications director. At the conclusion of the 1977–78 season, Rasmussen was fired by the Whalers. Thus began the pursuit of ESPN, incorporating the fledgling network on July 14, 1978.
- Bob Neumeier's first job in broadcasting began in 1975 on WTIC in Hartford, Connecticut, where he called play-by-play of the Whalers, working with Bill Rasmussen and Larry Pleau; among their calls was the famous "Brawl at the Mall" in April 1975 during a playoff series with the Minnesota Fighting Saints.

== See also ==
- List of Edmonton Oilers broadcasters
- List of Hartford Whalers broadcasters
- Quebec Nordiques#Broadcasters
- List of Winnipeg Jets broadcasters
