= Sleep on It =

Sleep on It may refer to:

- Sleep on It (TV series)
- "Sleep on It" (song)
- Sleep On It (band)
