= Troy Murray =

Canadian ice hockey player (1962–2026)

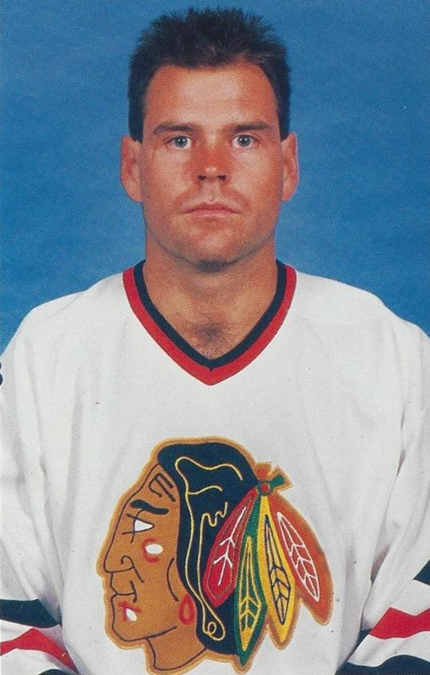
- Murray in 1988 photo
- Born: July 31, 1962 Calgary, Alberta, Canada
- Died: March 7, 2026 (aged 63) Chicago, Illinois, US
- Height: 6 ft 0 in (183 cm)
- Weight: 195 lb (88 kg; 13 st 13 lb)
- Position: Centre
- Shot: Right
- Played for: Chicago Blackhawks; Winnipeg Jets; Ottawa Senators; Pittsburgh Penguins; Colorado Avalanche
- National team: Canada
- NHL draft: 57th overall, 1980; Chicago Blackhawks
- Playing career: 1982–1997

Troy Norman Murray (July 31, 1962 – March 7, 2026) was a Canadian professional ice hockey centre who played in the National Hockey League (NHL). Murray was born in Calgary, Alberta, but grew up in St. Albert, Alberta. Before playing collegiate hockey for the University of North Dakota, he was selected by the Chicago Blackhawks as the 57th overall pick in the 1980 NHL entry draft. In 1982, he represented Canada's national junior team, winning a gold medal at the World Junior Championships and returned with the senior team at the 1987 World Championships. He began his professional career with the Blackhawks in 1982 and spent the next nine seasons with the team, winning the Frank J. Selke Trophy as the league's best defensive forward in 1986. In 1992, he was traded to the Winnipeg Jets, before returning to the Blackhawks and the stops with the Ottawa Senators and Pittsburgh Penguins. He won the Stanley Cup with his final NHL team, the Colorado Avalanche in 1996 before retiring from playing in 1997. Post retirement, he was the colour analyst on Blackhawks radio and TV broadcasts.

== Playing career ==
=== Amateur ===
Murray played part of two seasons with the St. Albert Saints of the Alberta Junior Hockey League (AJHL). He also played briefly in two games with the Lethbridge Broncos of the Western Hockey League (WHL) in the 1979–80 season. In his first game with Lethbridge, he scored his only goal of his WHL career. In two games with Lethbridge, he scored the one goal, one assist for two points. Going into the 1980–81 season, the WHL along with the rest of the Canadian Major Junior Hockey League sought to renegotiate the terms of the National Hockey League (NHL)'s entry draft, introducing new rules to players selected out of tier two junior teams, such as those from the AJHL. This affected Murray and where he would play going into the season.

He joined the University of North Dakota of the Western Collegiate Hockey Association (WCHA), trying out for the team in September 1980. He started the Fighting Sioux's 1980-81 season centreing the third line, slotted between Glen White and Dan Brennan. He led North Dakota in scoring as a freshman, with 33 goals and 78 points in 38 games, and finished third overall in WCHA scoring. The Fighting Sioux qualified for the WCHA playoffs but were knocked out by Michigan Tech. He was named to the All-WCHA Second All-Star Team and the conference's Rookie of the Year.

In his sophomore season in 1981–82, Murray centred the team's number one line between Brennan and Cary Eades. He finished with 22 goals and 51 points in 42 games, second on the team in scoring. The team earned the regular season title and made the playoffs, advancing to the WCHA final where they were beaten by the Wisconsin Badgers to finish second. That second-place finish qualified them for the 1982 NCAA tournament where they beat Clarkson Golden Knights to advance to the Frozen Four. They defeated the Northeastern Huskies to meet the Badgers in the final, over whom they won the championship. He was once again named to the Second All-Star Team alongside teammates James Patrick and Craig Ludwig.

=== Professional ===
==== Chicago Black Hawks ====
Murray was selected by the Chicago Black Hawks in the third round with the 57th overall selection of the 1980 NHL entry draft. He signed a three-year contract with Chicago on April 1, 1982. He made his NHL debut in the 1981–82 season on April 4, in a 4–3 victory over the Minnesota North Stars, playing on a line with Terry Ruskowski and Ted Bulley. The Black Hawks finished fourth in the division and faced the North Stars, who led the Norris division, in the opening round of the playoffs. He made his NHL playoff debut on April 7 in game one of the series. After beating the North Stars, they advanced to meet the St. Louis Blues in the conference semi-finals. With an injury to Ruskowski in game two of the series, Murray and fellow rookie Bill Gardner took larger roles on the team. He scored his first NHL playoff goal on April 19 in a 7–4 win over the Blues. The Black Hawks were defeated in the Campbell Conference Final by the Vancouver Canucks. In total, Murray appeared in seven playoff games over the three series, scoring the one goal.

He made the Black Hawks opening day roster for the 1982–83 season, placed on the third line with Tim Higgins and Peter Marsh, with Rick Paterson later replacing Higgins. His first NHL regular season goal came against the Toronto Maple Leafs on October 16 in a 3–2 victory. Between March 12 and April 1, 1983, he played only once. He finished his rookie season with eight goals and 16 points in 54 games. The Black Hawks finished atop the Norris division and faced the Blues in the opening round. He made his only appearance of the series on April 10 in a 5–3 victory. He did not make another appearance in the playoffs until the Campbell Conference Final against the Edmonton Oilers on May 3 in a 6–3 loss to end the Black Hawks season. In the two playoff games, Murray went scoreless.

He began establishing himself as a defensive centre who could shadow top players like Wayne Gretzky but could add in offensively and be a quality penalty killer in the 1983–84 season. On November 25, in a game against the Buffalo Sabres, Murray was checked by Mike Foligno, who struck Murray's knee. Murray was taken off the ice on a stretcher, having suffered strained knee ligaments. He returned to the lineup in January 1984, centreing Paterson and Rich Preston on the third line. With the Black Hawks struggling at the end of February, head coach Orval Tessier switched up his lines, putting Murray between Steve Ludzik and Jeff Larmer. On March 21, he recorded a three-point game, scoring two goals and assisting on another by Denis Savard in a 6–2 victory over the Winnipeg Jets. The Black Hawks qualified for the playoffs and faced the Minnesota North Stars in the first round best-of-five series. In game four Murray scored the game winner to force the series to a deciding fifth game. The Black Hawks ultimately lost the series to the North Stars and Murray scored the one goal in the five games. At the end of the season, he received a vote for the Frank J. Selke trophy as the league's best defensive centre.

Murray opened the 1984–85 season on a line with Curt Fraser and rookie Eddie Olczyk. On October 11, Murray recorded a three-point game, scoring one goal and assisting on two others by Olczyk and Ludzik in a 7–3 victory over the Detroit Red Wings. He recorded another one on November 17, scoring once and assisting on goals by Fraser and Olczyk in a 7–0 victory over the Hartford Whalers. At the end of November Coach Tessier changed the lines up, moving Murray between Al Secord and Dan Frawley. On December 21, he scored two goals and assisted on another by Tom Lysiak in a 4–3 win over the Toronto Maple Leafs. On January 19, 1985, he tallied another three-point game, marking one goal and assisting on two others by Olczyk and Lysiak in a 5–4 loss to the Pittsburgh Penguins. On February 3, Tessier was fired as head coach and general manager Bob Pulford took over the position. The line with Olczyk and Fraser was reunited and dubbed the "Six Hundred Pounds of Beef" line by USA Today. He repeated the three-point-game feat on February 27, scoring one goal and assisting on two others by Olczyk and Fraser in a 6–3 win over the New Jersey Devils. He marked two goals and assisted on another by Olcyzk in a 6–4 win over the Canucks on March 17. He finished the season with 26 goals and 66 points in 80 games. The Black Hawks finished second in the Norris Division and faced the Red Wings in the opening round of the playoffs. After eliminating the Red Wings, and then the North Stars, the Black Hawks faced the Oilers in the Campbell Conference final. In the game that eliminated the North Stars on April 30, Murray recorded three points, scoring once and assisting on goals by Fraser and Darryl Sutter. The Oilers defeated the Black Hawks to advance to the Stanley Cup Final.

Ahead of the 1985–86 season, Murray signed a new three-year contract plus an option year with the Black Hawks. Murray started the season on the second line with Olczyk and Fraser, with Bill Watson swapping in. He recorded his first three-point game of the season on October 23, repeating the feat on November 13 and November 17. On December 11, he marked his first four-point game, scoring two goals and assisting on two others by Fraser and Jack O'Callahan in a 12–9 loss to the Oilers. On December 22, he did it again, scoring two goals, including the overtime winner, and assisting on two others by Paterson and Ken Yaremchuk in a 5–4 victory over the Calgary Flames. He recorded his first career hat trick on January 1, 1986, in a 7–4 win over the Penguins. He had another three-point game on January 10, scoring twice and setting up another goal by Olczyk in a 9–4 victory over the Red Wings. On February 19, he tallied his second hat-trick in a four-point night that included assisting on a goal by Sutter in a 6–5 loss to the North Stars. At this point, regarded as one of the best two-way centres in the game by the media three games later on February 27, scoring another hat-trick and adding assists on two goals by Olczyk in a five-point night in a 6–3 win over the Los Angeles Kings. He had two more three-point nights, on March 2 and March 23. Murray's scoring peaked during the season, as he tallied 45 goals and 99 points in 80 games. The team finished atop the Norris Division but were swept by the Maple Leafs in the first round of the playoffs. Murray played only the first two games of the series due to a broken hand. He was awarded the Frank J. Selke Trophy for best defensive forward in the league that year.

Operating as the team's second line centre, Murray opened the 1986–87 season flanked by Watson and Sutter. On October 26, he registered a four-point game, scoring once and assisting on two goals by Fraser and one by Sutter in an 8–4 victory over the Jets. He marked a three-point game against the Oilers in a 6–5 win on November 28, scoring twice and assisting on another by Secord. On December 28, he scored once and assisted on goals by Olczyk and Fraser in a 7–5 win over the Washington Capitals. His streak of consecutive games played ended at 238 on January 4, 1987, after injuring his thumb in a game on January 3 against the Whalers. After missing three games, he returned to the lineup on January 14. On February 1, he scored once and assisted on goals by Steve Larmer, Wayne Presley, and Fraser in a four-point night against the Oilers, who lost to the Blackhawks 6–4. On March 28, he recorded a three-point night in a 5–4 loss to the Quebec Nordiques, scoring once and assisting on two goals by Sutter. In April, with Fraser out with injury, the lines were shuffled and Murray centred the second line with Olczyk and Presley on his flanks. He finished the season with 28 goals and 71 points in 77 games. The Blackhawks qualified for the playoffs on the final day of the season, finishing third in the Norris and facing the Red Wings in the opening round. For the second consecutive season, the Blackhawks were swept out of the playoffs in the first round. In the four games in the series, Murray went scoreless.

After the previous season saw a decline in Murray's offensive output, there was hope that he would rebound in the 1987–88 season. Under new head coach Bob Murdoch, Murray opened the season with new linemates Dan Vincelette and Rick Vaive. On November 11, he tallied three points, assisting on all three goals by Presley in a 6–3 win over the Red Wings. In the new year, Watson replaced Vincelette on Murray and Vaive's line. On February 14, 1988, Murray scored once and assisted on goals by Duane Sutter and Steve Thomas in a 4–3 win over the Sabres. The rebound in scoring did not happen as Murray, in 79 games, tallied 22 goals and 58 points with the Blackhawks. The team finished third in the Norris and faced the Blues in the first round of the playoffs. For the third consecutive season, Chicago was knocked out of contention in the first round. In five playoff games, Murray marked one goal.

The Blackhawks changed head coaches once again in the offseason, bringing in Mike Keenan to helm the team. Under Keenan, Murray saw his ice time cut starting in November, stating the centre did not work as hard as others. The acquisition of large centre Adam Creighton in December allowed Keenan to change Murray's role on the team, with Murray adding more offence to his play. However, by February, he was struggling offensively again. On the final day of the season on April 2, Murray's overtime goal in a 4–3 victory over the Maple Leafs secured the fourth spot in the Norris and the final playoff spot. In 79 games in 1988–89, he tallied 21 goals and 51 points. Chicago defeated the Red Wings in the opening round, and then eliminated the Blues, but fell to the Flames in the Campbell Conference final. In 16 playoff games, Murray tallied three goals and nine points.

In the offseason, Keenan offered Murray to other teams in a trade but no deal was completed. With the full-time arrival of young prospect Jeremy Roenick in 1989–90, Murray was moved to the wing on the third line with Roenick and Thomas to start the season. On October 12, he recorded a three-point night, scoring once and assisting on goals by Doug Wilson and Mike Hudson in a 6–3 loss to the Maple Leafs. Now on a line with Dirk Graham and Thomas and back at centre, Murray recorded his fourth hat trick and assisted on another by Thomas in a 5–3 victory over the Red Wings. At the end of December, he underwent surgery for bone chips in his elbow, missing eleven games before returning in late January 1990. On February 20, he recorded three assists on two goals by Jocelyn Lemieux and another by Thomas in 8–3 win over the Blues. By the end of the season, he was on a line with Lemieux and Greg Gilbert. The Blackhawks ended the season atop the Norris and Murray finished with 17 goals and 55 points in 68 games. The Blackhawks advanced to the Campbell Conference final for the second consecutive season, but were eliminated by the Oilers. In 20 playoff games, he tallied four goals and eight points.

Keenan was still unhappy with Murray's output ahead of the 1990–91 season, calling him out in the media again for his insufficient goalscoring. He struggled to start the season, not scoring a goal until October 18, a goalless streak that stretched back to the previous March. In late December, Murray suffered a groin injury that caused him to miss a few games. On his return in December he was on a line with Gilbert and Graham. By February 1991, Thomas had replaced Gilbert on the line. However, he went through another scoring drought, ending his 15-game streak on March 3, when he scored twice and assisted on another by Gilbert in an 8–0 win over the Canucks. The Blackhawks finished first overall in the league standings, winning their first Presidents' Trophy and finished atop the Norris again. However, the team was defeated in the opening round of the playoffs by the North Stars. In the six-game series, Murray tallied one assist.

==== Winnipeg Jets ====
In the 1991 offseason, Murray was a Group 2 free agent, in which he was able to negotiated with any team, but his current team, the Blackhawks could match any offer or receive compensation. The Blackhawks initially sought to re-sign Murray, however, he was traded to the Winnipeg Jets along with forward Warren Rychel for defencemen Bryan Marchment and Chris Norton on July 22. In his parting comments, he expressed his dislike for Keenan, stating "I'm disappointed he's here [Chicago] and I'm not." In October, Murray was named team captain of the Jets. Continuing his role as a defence-first forward for the Jets, he was placed on a line with Mark Osborne and Danton Cole, and tasked with shutting down the opposition's top forwards. He tallied his first point for the Jets in the season-opening game of the 1991–92 season on October 4, assisting on two goals by Fredrik Olausson in a 6–3 loss to the Kings. He recorded his first goal with the team in the next game, a 5–3 victory over the Flames. On October 23, he suffered a separated shoulder that caused him to miss nine days. In December he missed time after he was struck by an Al MacInnis slapshot that cut him and required 26 stitches to close. By February 1992, Paul MacDermid had replaced Cole on Murray's line. He finished with 17 goals and 47 points in 79 games. The Jets finished fourth in the Smythe Division and faced the Canucks in the opening round of the playoffs. In seven games, Murray went scoreless as the Canucks eliminated the Jets.

Murray missed the opening of the 1992–93 season due to a partially separated shoulder. He returned on October 16 after sitting out the first five games. Both the Jets and Murray were struggling by December and then on December 19, Murray was struck by a shot from Ron Wilson that broke his left foot. He returned to the lineup on February 3, 1993 after missing 22 games. However, the Jets, who had turned around their season in his absence, had an issue re-inserting him into their lineup. In 29 games with Winnipeg, he scored three goals and seven points.

==== Return to Blackhawks ====
With young centre Stu Barnes improving his play, it made Murray expendable for the Jets and he was traded back to the Blackhawks for defenceman Steve Bancroft and future considerations. He made his season debut for the Blackhawks on February 25 against the Tampa Bay Lightning on a line with Brent Sutter and Stéphane Matteau. He made 22 appearances with Chicago, scoring one goal and four points. The Blackhawks won the Norris Division and faced the fourth-place Blues in the first round of the playoffs. However, the underdog Blues swept the Blackhawks and Murray went scoreless in the series.

In the 1993 offseason, the NHL expanded by two teams, the Anaheim Mighty Ducks and the Florida Panthers. Murray was among the players the Blackhawks left unprotected in the expansion draft. However, he was not selected. At the end of training camp, he was put on the waiver draft but went untouched. He opened the 1993–94 season with the Blackhawks, but head coach Darryl Sutter found limited opportunities for him. In February 1994, having seen little playing time, he was placed on waivers and after going unclaimed, was assigned to Chicago's American Hockey League affiliate, the Indianapolis Ice. He made 12 appearances for Chicago, registering one point and eight appearances for Indianapolis, scoring three goals and six points.

==== Ottawa Senators and Pittsburgh Penguins ====
On March 11, 1994, he was traded by Chicago to the Ottawa Senators for future considerations, with a large portion of his contract still being paid by the Blackhawks. (Note: The future considerations turned out to be swapping 11th round draft picks with Chicago in the 1994 NHL entry draft.) He made his Senators debut on March 13 in a 5–1 loss to the Mighty Ducks. He recorded his first point with the Senators on March 20 assisting on a goal by Kerry Huffman and his first goal on March 28. In 15 games with Ottawa, he scored two goals and five points. The Senators finished last in the league and out of the playoffs. In the lockout-shortened 1994–95 season, Murray was named one of the Senators alternate captains. In February 1995, a controversy arose with Ottawa's star youngsters Alexei Yashin and Alexandre Daigle after Ottawa's leadership group, of which Murray was a part of, confronted the pair about their on-ice play. Yashin's agent then criticised Murray and team captain Randy Cunneyworth in the media for the confrontation and how they went about it. Operating on a line with Phil Bourque and Bill Huard, in 33 games with Ottawa, he scored four goals and 14 points.

Murray, along with defenceman Norm Maciver, was traded to the Pittsburgh Penguins for forward Martin Straka on April 7. He made his Penguins debut on April 8 in a 2–1 loss to the Montreal Canadiens. He recorded his first points for the Penguins on April 15, assisting on goals by Joe Mullen and Chris Tamer in a 5–2 victory against the Senators. In 13 games with the Penguins, he recorded only the two assists. The Penguins finished second in the Northeast Division and qualified for the playoffs. Placed on the third line alongside Mullen and Mike Hudson, he scored his first goal for the Penguins on May 16 in the first round against the Capitals. The team advanced to the second round against the Devils who eliminated them. In 12 playoff games, he recorded two goals and three points.

==== Colorado Avalanche and final season ====
Murray signed as a free agent with the Colorado Avalanche for the 1995–96 season. He made his Avalanche debut in the team's season opening 3–2 victory over the Red Wings on October 6. He tallied his first point on October 9 with his new team assisting on Joe Sakic's goal in a 6–6 tie with the Penguins. He scored his first goal with Colorado on October 27 in a 5–4 victory over the Sabres. At the end of November he suffered a sprained knee that caused him to miss 11 games, returning at the end of December. He finished the season with seven goals and 21 points in 63 games. The Avalanche finished atop the Pacific Division and made it all the way to the Stanley Cup Final. There, they defeated the Panthers in four games, winning the Stanley Cup. Murray only took part in eight playoff contests, going scoreless.

An unrestricted free agent at the end of the season, Murray signed with the Chicago Wolves of the International Hockey League (IHL) on September 26, 1996. Head coach Grant Mulvey named Murray as the team's new captain, replacing Steve Maltais. He was selected to play in the IHL's 1997 All-Star Game. He recorded 21 goals and 50 points in 81 games with the Wolves. The Wolves qualified for the playoffs but were eliminated by the San Antonio Dragons in the opening round. In four playoff games Murray registered two assists. He retired after the season.

== International play ==
Medal record

Representing Canada

Ice hockey

World Junior Championships
Gold medal – first place	1982 United States	

Murray was chosen to play for Team Canada at the 1982 World Junior Championships. He was named team captain and finished seventh in team scoring with four goals and eight points in seven games. The team earned a gold medal after beating Czechoslovakia in the final. In 1987, Murray was selected to play for Canada's senior team at the 1987 World Championships. However, the team faltered in the medal round, losing to Sweden 9–0 to finish fourth in the tournament.

== Broadcasting career ==
After retirement Murray became a commodities trader after turning down coaching opportunities. He joined the Blackhawks TV crew at Fox Sports as a studio analyst in 1998. He worked on Game Room, the pre- and post-game show providing analysis of Blackhawks games. In November 2003, Murray replaced Dale Tallon on the team's TV broadcast as the colour commentator, working alongside Pat Foley. Their broadcast was simulcast on the then radio flagship WSCR. Before the start of the 2006–07 season, the team ended the simulcast, opting to split the radio and TV broadcasts. Foley and Murray were let go from the TV operation, with Murray returning as the colour commentator on radio broadcasts only, alongside former New York Islanders voice John Wiedeman. In 2008, the radio broadcast switched to WGN. The pair, along with Judd Sirott, won the "Best Radio Play-by-Play Award" at the Illinois Broadcasters Association’s Silver Dome Awards in 2011, 2014, 2015, and 2017.

Murray announced he was diagnosed with cancer on August 9, 2021, but continued to broadcast albeit with a diminished workload. In August 2022, the Blackhawks announced Murray and Patrick Sharp together succeeded Eddie Olczyk as the team's TV colour commentator. However, Murray was replaced by Darren Pang before the 2023 season as the team's TV colour commentator. Murray moved back to the radio booth to provide colour commentary.

== Personal life ==
In 1987, Murray, Curt Fraser, and Gary Nylund of the Blackhawks and members of the National Football League's Chicago Bears, including Walter Payton, formed a rock band in Chicago called the Chicago Six and performed live at various venues in the city. He left the band in 1988. Post retirement, he became president of the Chicago Blackhawks Alumni Association.

== Death ==
Murray died in Chicago from cancer on March 7, 2026, at the age of 63.

== Career statistics ==
=== Regular season and playoffs ===
			Regular season					Playoffs
Season	Team	League	GP	G	A	Pts	PIM	GP	G	A	Pts	PIM
1978–79	St. Albert Saints	AJHL	60	33	47	80	91	—	—	—	—	—
1979–80	St. Albert Saints	AJHL	60	53	47	100	101	—	—	—	—	—
1979–80	Lethbridge Broncos	WHL	2	1	1	2	2	—	—	—	—	—
1980–81	University of North Dakota	WCHA	38	33	45	78	28	—	—	—	—	—
1981–82	University of North Dakota	WCHA	42	22	29	51	62	—	—	—	—	—
1981–82	Chicago Black Hawks	NHL	1	0	0	0	0	7	1	0	1	5
1982–83	Chicago Black Hawks	NHL	54	8	8	16	27	2	0	0	0	0
1983–84	Chicago Black Hawks	NHL	61	15	15	30	45	5	1	0	1	7
1984–85	Chicago Black Hawks	NHL	80	26	40	66	82	15	5	14	19	24
1985–86	Chicago Black Hawks	NHL	80	45	54	99	94	2	0	0	0	2
1986–87	Chicago Blackhawks	NHL	77	28	43	71	59	4	0	0	0	5
1987–88	Chicago Blackhawks	NHL	79	22	36	58	96	5	1	0	1	8
1988–89	Chicago Blackhawks	NHL	79	21	30	51	113	16	3	6	9	25
1989–90	Chicago Blackhawks	NHL	68	17	38	55	86	20	4	4	8	22
1990–91	Chicago Blackhawks	NHL	75	14	23	37	74	6	0	1	1	12
1991–92	Winnipeg Jets	NHL	74	17	30	47	69	7	0	0	0	2
1992–93	Winnipeg Jets	NHL	29	3	4	7	34	—	—	—	—	—
1992–93	Chicago Blackhawks	NHL	22	1	3	4	25	4	0	0	0	2
1993–94	Indianapolis Ice	IHL	8	3	3	6	12	—	—	—	—	—
1993–94	Chicago Blackhawks	NHL	12	0	1	1	6	—	—	—	—	—
1993–94	Ottawa Senators	NHL	15	2	3	5	4	—	—	—	—	—
1994–95	Ottawa Senators	NHL	33	4	10	14	16	—	—	—	—	—
1994–95	Pittsburgh Penguins	NHL	13	0	2	2	23	12	2	1	3	12
1995–96	Colorado Avalanche	NHL	63	7	14	21	22	8	0	0	0	19
1996–97	Chicago Wolves	IHL	81	21	29	50	63	4	0	2	2	2
NHL totals			914	230	354	584	875	113	17	26	43	145

=== International ===
Year	Team	Event	Result	GP	G	A	Pts	PIM
1982	Canada	WJC	1st place, gold medalist(s)	7	4	4	8	6
1987	Canada	WC	4th	10	2	2	4	14
Junior totals				7	4	4	8	6
Senior totals				10	2	2	4	14

== Awards and honours ==
Award	Year
College
WCHA Rookie of the Year	1981
All-WCHA Second Team	1981
All-WCHA Second Team	1982
NCAA title	1982
NHL
Frank J. Selke Trophy	1986
Stanley Cup	1996

== Bibliography ==
- Bamford, Tab (2011). 100 Things Blackhawks Fans Should Know Before They Die. Chicago: Triumph Books. ISBN 978-1-60078-652-5.
- Podnieks, Andrew (1998). Red, White, and Gold: Canada at the World Junior Championships 1974–1999. Toronto: ECW Press. ISBN 1-55022-382-8.

Sporting positions
Preceded by Randy Carlyle; Thomas Steen	Winnipeg Jets captain 1991–93	Succeeded by Dean Kennedy
Awards and achievements
Preceded by Craig Ramsay	Winner of the Frank J. Selke Trophy; 1986	Succeeded by Dave Poulin
