= Brian Davies =

Brian Davies may refer to:

- Brian Davies (philosopher) (born 1951), professor of philosophy at Fordham University
- E. Brian Davies (1944–2025), British mathematician
- Brian Davies (rugby league) (1930–2012), Australian rugby league player
- Brian Davies (rugby union) (1941–2020), Welsh rugby union player
- Brian Davies (activist) (1935–2022), British animal welfare activist
- Brian Davies (engineer), British professor of medical robotics
- Brian Davies (actor) in A Funny Thing Happened on the Way to the Forum, and The Sound of Music

== See also ==
- Brian Davis (disambiguation)
- Bryan Davies (disambiguation)
