= Bryan Davies =

Bryan Davies may refer to:

- Bryan Davies, Baron Davies of Oldham (born 1939), Labour member of the House of Lords
- Bryan Davies (singer) (born 1944), Australian singer and actor
  - The Bryan Davies Show, an Australian television series
- Bryan Martin Davies (1933–2014), Welsh poet, author and translator

== See also ==
- Brian Davies (disambiguation)
- Bryan Davis (disambiguation)
