= John Wiedeman =

American broadcaster

John Wiedeman is an American broadcaster who is the radio play-by-play announcer for the National Hockey League's Chicago Blackhawks.

== Early life and career ==
Wiedeman grew up in Kansas City, Missouri. He worked for his family's plumbing parts supply company until 1988. Wiedeman attended the University of Kansas and graduated in 1989. He decided to pursue a career in broadcasting at the age of 31. Wiedeman moved to Chicago in 1992 where he hoped to find work as a sports broadcaster. He was a bartender at a comedy club in Mount Prospect, Illinois and also served as an unpaid reporter for WCSJ in Morris, Illinois to cover Chicago Blackhawks games.

== Broadcasting career ==
Wiedeman served as the radio and TV play-by-play broadcaster for the Muskegon Fury (1992–1994), Worcester IceCats (1994–1996), and Cincinnati Cyclones (1997–2001). He worked his way to the National Hockey League (NHL), where he served as the radio and substitute TV play-by-play commentator for the Philadelphia Flyers (1996), Tampa Bay Lightning (1997), Columbus Blue Jackets (2001), and New York Islanders (2001–2006). He joined the Chicago Blackhawks in 2006 and served as the team's radio play-by-play commentator. Wiedeman provided commentary for the Blackhawks alongside Troy Murray on the radio, including three Stanley Cup Final:2010, 2013 and 2015.

In 2021, the Blackhawks announced Pat Foley would retire as the team's TV play-by-play commentator after the season. Wiedeman, along with other announcers, "auditioned" to succeed Foley throughout the 2021–22 NHL season. In April 2022, the Blackhawks announced that Wiedeman would retain his role as the team's radio broadcast play-by-play announcer, and would not be selected to replace Foley on TV for the 2022–23 NHL season. Wiedeman signed a three-year extension with the Blackhawks in April 2024.

== Awards and honors ==
John has been awarded the following honors by the Illinois Broadcasters Association:

- 2015 Best Play by Play, Chicago Market. Shared with colleagues Troy Murray and Judd Sirott.
- 2014 Best Play by Play, Chicago Market. Shared with Murray and Sirott.
- 2014 National Sportscaster and Sportswriters Association Illinois Sportscaster of the Year.
- 2012 Best Sports Story shared with Murray.
- 2011 Best Play by Play, Chicago Market shared with Murray.

== Personal life ==
Wiedeman and his wife, Kelly, have one daughter and one son.
