= List of Chicago Blackhawks seasons =

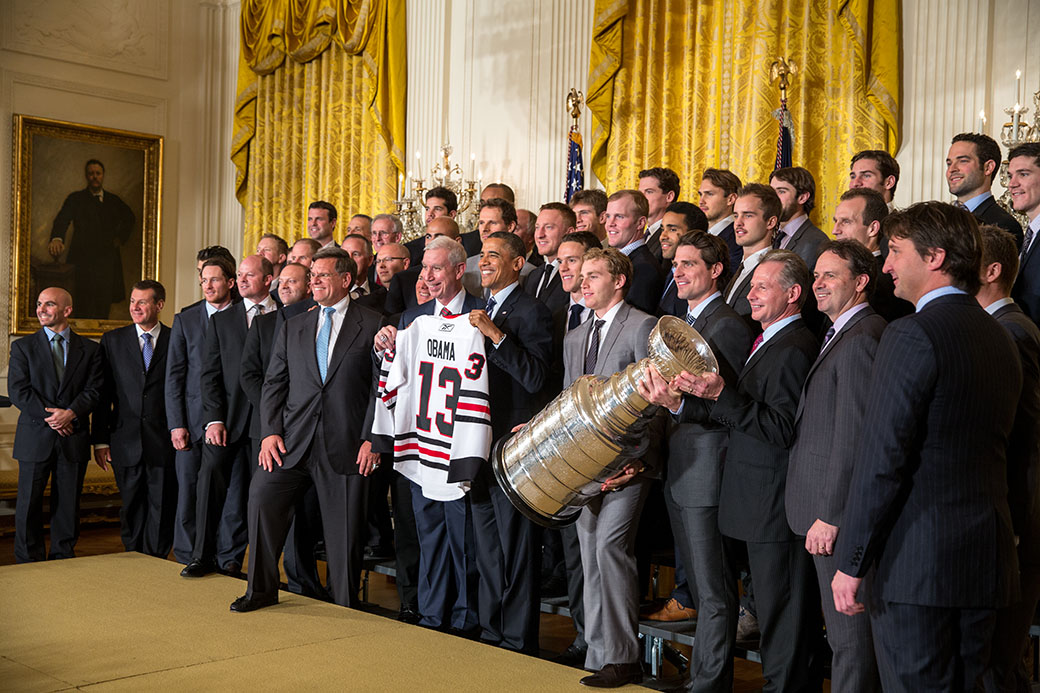
The 2013 Stanley Cup champion Blackhawks meet U.S. President Barack Obama.

The Chicago Blackhawks are a professional ice hockey team based in Chicago. The team is a member of the Central Division of the Western Conference of the National Hockey League (NHL). Since their inception in 1926, the Blackhawks have reached 13 Stanley Cup Final and won the title six times (1934, 1938, 1961, 2010, 2013 and 2015).

== Table key ==
Key of colors and symbols
Color/symbol	Explanation
†	Stanley Cup champions
‡	Conference champions
↑	Division champions
#	Led league in points

Key of terms and abbreviations
Term or abbreviation	Definition
Finish	Final position in division or league standings
GP	Number of games played
W	Number of wins
L	Number of losses
T	Number of ties
OT	Number of losses in overtime (since the 1999–2000 season)
Pts	Number of points
GF	Goals for (goals scored by the Blackhawks)
GA	Goals against (goals scored by the Blackhawks' opponents)
—	Does not apply
TG	Two-game total goals series

== Year by year ==
Season	Blackhawks season	Conference	Division	Regular season									Postseason						
Season	Blackhawks season	Conference	Division	Finish	GP	W	L	T	OT	Pts	GF	GA	GP	W	L	T	GF	GA	Result
Chicago Black Hawks
1926–27	1926–27	—	American	3rd	44	19	22	3	—	41	115	116	2	0	1	1	5	10	Lost in quarterfinals, 5–10 (TG)^{1} (Bruins)
1927–28	1927–28	—	American	5th	44	7	34	3	—	17	68	134	—	—	—	—	—	—	Did not qualify
1928–29	1928–29	—	American	5th	44	7	29	8	—	22	33	85	—	—	—	—	—	—	Did not qualify
1929–30	1929–30	—	American	2nd	44	21	18	5	—	47	117	111	2	0	1	1	2	3	Lost in quarterfinals, 2–3 (TG)^{1} (Canadiens)
1930–31	1930–31	—	American	2nd	44	24	17	3	—	51	108	78	9	5	3	1	15	14	Won in quarterfinals, 4–3 (TG)^{1} (Maple Leafs); Won in semifinals, 3–0 (TG)^{1} (Rangers); Lost in Stanley Cup Final, 2–3 (Canadiens)
1931–32	1931–32	—	American	2nd	48	18	19	11	—	47	86	101	2	1	1	0	2	6	Lost in quarterfinals, 2–6 (TG)^{1} (Maple Leafs)
1932–33	1932–33	—	American	4th	48	16	20	12	—	44	88	101	—	—	—	—	—	—	Did not qualify
1933–34	1933–34	—	American	2nd	48	20	17	11	—	51	88	83	8	6	1	1	19	12	Won in quarterfinals, 4–3 (TG)^{1} (Canadiens); Won in semifinals, 6–2 (TG)^{1} (Maroons); Won in Stanley Cup Final, 3–1 (Red Wings)†
1934–35	1934–35	—	American	2nd	48	26	17	5	—	57	118	88	2	0	1	1	0	1	Lost in quarterfinals, 0–1 (TG)^{1} (Maroons)
1935–36	1935–36	—	American	3rd	48	21	19	8	—	50	93	92	2	1	1	0	5	7	Lost in quarterfinals, 5–7 (TG)^{1} (Americans)
1936–37	1936–37	—	American	4th	48	14	27	7	—	35	99	131	—	—	—	—	—	—	Did not qualify
1937–38	1937–38	—	American	3rd	48	14	25	9	—	37	97	139	10	7	3	0	26	21	Won in quarterfinals, 2–1 (Canadiens); Won in semifinals, 2–1 (Americans); Won in Stanley Cup Final, 3–1 (Maple Leafs)†
1938–39	1938–39	—	—	7th	48	12	28	8	—	32	91	132	—	—	—	—	—	—	Did not qualify
1939–40	1939–40	—	—	4th	48	23	19	6	—	52	112	120	2	0	2	0	3	5	Lost in quarterfinals, 0–2 (Maple Leafs)
1940–41	1940–41	—	—	5th	48	16	25	7	—	39	112	139	5	2	3	0	10	12	Won in quarterfinals, 2–1 (Canadiens); Lost in semifinals, 0–2 (Red Wings)
1941–42	1941–42	—	—	4th	48	22	23	3	—	47	145	155	3	1	2	0	7	5	Lost in quarterfinals, 1–2 (Bruins)
1942–43	1942–43	—	—	5th	50	17	18	15	—	49	179	180	—	—	—	—	—	—	Did not qualify
1943–44	1943–44	—	—	4th	50	22	23	5	—	49	178	187	9	4	5	0	25	24	Won in semifinals, 4–1 (Red Wings); Lost in Stanley Cup Final, 0–4 (Canadiens)
1944–45	1944–45	—	—	5th	50	13	30	7	—	33	141	194	—	—	—	—	—	—	Did not qualify
1945–46	1945–46	—	—	3rd	50	23	20	7	—	53	200	178	4	0	4	0	7	26	Lost in semifinals, 0–4 (Canadiens)
1946–47	1946–47	—	—	6th	60	19	37	4	—	42	193	274	—	—	—	—	—	—	Did not qualify
1947–48	1947–48	—	—	6th	60	20	34	6	—	46	195	225	—	—	—	—	—	—	Did not qualify
1948–49	1948–49	—	—	5th	60	21	31	8	—	50	173	211	—	—	—	—	—	—	Did not qualify
1949–50	1949–50	—	—	6th	70	22	38	10	—	54	203	244	—	—	—	—	—	—	Did not qualify
1950–51	1950–51	—	—	6th	70	13	47	10	—	36	171	280	—	—	—	—	—	—	Did not qualify
1951–52	1951–52	—	—	6th	70	17	44	9	—	43	158	241	—	—	—	—	—	—	Did not qualify
1952–53	1952–53	—	—	4th	70	27	28	15	—	69	169	175	7	3	4	—	14	18	Lost in semifinals, 3–4 (Canadiens)
1953–54	1953–54	—	—	6th	70	12	51	7	—	31	133	242	—	—	—	—	—	—	Did not qualify
1954–55	1954–55	—	—	6th	70	13	40	17	—	43	161	235	—	—	—	—	—	—	Did not qualify
1955–56	1955–56	—	—	6th	70	19	39	12	—	50	155	216	—	—	—	—	—	—	Did not qualify
1956–57	1956–57	—	—	6th	70	16	39	15	—	47	169	225	—	—	—	—	—	—	Did not qualify
1957–58	1957–58	—	—	5th	70	24	39	7	—	55	163	202	—	—	—	—	—	—	Did not qualify
1958–59	1958–59	—	—	3rd	70	28	29	13	—	69	197	208	6	2	4	—	16	21	Lost in semifinals, 2–4 (Canadiens)
1959–60	1959–60	—	—	3rd	70	28	29	13	—	69	191	180	4	0	4	—	6	14	Lost in semifinals, 0–4 (Canadiens)
1960–61	1960–61	—	—	3rd	70	29	24	17	—	75	198	180	12	8	4	—	35	27	Won in semifinals, 4–2 (Canadiens); Won in Stanley Cup Final, 4–2 (Red Wings)†
1961–62	1961–62	—	—	3rd	70	31	26	13	—	75	217	186	12	6	6	—	34	31	Won in semifinals, 4–2 (Canadiens); Lost in Stanley Cup Final, 2–4 (Maple Leafs)
1962–63	1962–63	—	—	2nd	70	32	21	17	—	81	194	178	6	2	4	—	19	25	Lost in semifinals, 2–4 (Red Wings)
1963–64	1963–64	—	—	2nd	70	36	22	12	—	84	218	169	7	3	4	—	18	24	Lost in semifinals, 3–4 (Red Wings)
1964–65	1964–65	—	—	3rd	70	34	28	8	—	76	224	176	14	7	7	—	35	37	Won in semifinals, 4–3 (Red Wings); Lost in Stanley Cup Final, 3–4 (Canadiens)
1965–66	1965-66	—	—	2nd	70	37	25	8	—	82	240	187	6	2	4	—	10	22	Lost in semifinals, 2–4 (Red Wings)
1966–67	1966–67	—	—	1st	70	41	17	12	—	94#	262	170	6	2	4	—	14	18	Lost in semifinals, 2–4 (Maple Leafs)
1967–68	1967–68	—	East	4th	74	32	26	16	—	80	212	222	11	5	6	—	28	34	Won in quarterfinals, 4–2 (Rangers); Lost in semifinals, 1–4 (Canadiens)
1968–69	1968–69	—	East	6th	76	34	33	9	—	77	280	246	—	—	—	—	—	—	Did not qualify
1969–70	1969–70	—	East↑	1st	76	45	22	9	—	99#	250	170	8	4	4	—	26	28	Won in quarterfinals, 4–0 (Red Wings); Lost in semifinals, 0–4 (Bruins)
1970–71	1970–71	—	West↑	1st	78	49	20	9	—	107	277	184	18	11	7	—	59	42	Won in quarterfinals, 4–0 (Flyers); Won in semifinals, 4–3 (Rangers); Lost in Stanley Cup Final, 3–4 (Canadiens)
1971–72	1971–72	—	West↑	1st	78	46	17	15	—	107	256	166	8	4	4	—	23	25	Won in quarterfinals, 4–0 (Penguins); Lost in semifinals, 0–4 (Rangers)
1972–73	1972–73	—	West↑	1st	78	42	27	9	—	93	284	225	16	10	6	—	60	53	Won in quarterfinals, 4–1 (Blues); Won in semifinals, 4–1 (Rangers); Lost in Stanley Cup Final, 2–4 (Canadiens)
1973–74	1973–74	—	West	2nd	78	41	14	23	—	105	272	164	11	6	5	—	30	35	Won in quarterfinals, 4–1 (Kings); Lost in semifinals, 2–4 (Bruins)
1974–75	1974–75	Campbell	Smythe	3rd	80	37	35	8	—	82	268	241	8	3	5	—	22	35	Won in preliminary round, 2–1 (Bruins); Lost in quarterfinals, 1–4 (Sabres)
1975–76	1975–76	Campbell	Smythe↑	1st	80	32	30	18	—	82	254	261	4	0	4	—	3	13	Lost in quarterfinals, 0–4 (Canadiens)
1976–77	1976–77	Campbell	Smythe	3rd	80	26	43	11	—	63	240	298	2	0	2	—	3	7	Lost in preliminary round, 0–2 (Islanders)
1977–78	1977–78	Campbell	Smythe↑	1st	80	32	29	19	—	83	230	220	4	0	4	—	9	19	Lost in quarterfinals, 0–4 (Bruins)
1978–79	1978–79	Campbell	Smythe↑	1st	80	29	36	15	—	73	244	277	4	0	4	—	3	14	Lost in quarterfinals, 0–4 (Islanders)
1979–80	1979–80	Campbell	Smythe↑	1st	80	34	27	19	—	87	241	250	7	3	4	—	19	20	Won in preliminary round, 3–0 (Blues); Lost in quarterfinals, 0–4 (Sabres)
1980–81	1980–81	Campbell	Smythe	2nd	80	31	33	16	—	78	304	315	3	0	3	—	9	15	Lost in preliminary round, 0–3 (Flames)
1981–82	1981–82	Campbell	Norris	4th	80	30	38	12	—	72	332	363	15	8	7	—	50	51	Won in division semifinals, 3–1 (North Stars); Won in division finals, 4–2 (Blues); Lost in conference finals, 1–4 (Canucks)
1982–83	1982–83	Campbell	Norris↑	1st	80	47	23	10	—	104	338	268	13	7	6	—	49	51	Won in division semifinals, 3–1 (Blues); Won in division finals, 4–1 (North Stars); Lost in conference finals, 0–4 (Oilers)
1983–84	1983–84	Campbell	Norris	4th	80	30	42	8	—	68	277	311	5	2	3	—	14	18	Lost in division semifinals, 2–3 (North Stars)
1984–85	1984–85	Campbell	Norris	2nd	80	38	35	7	—	83	309	299	15	9	6	—	81	81	Won in division semifinals, 3–0 (Red Wings); Won in division finals, 4–2 (North Stars); Lost in conference finals, 2–4 (Oilers)
1985–86	1985–86	Campbell	Norris↑	1st	80	39	33	8	—	86	351	349	3	0	3	—	9	18	Lost in division semifinals, 0–3 (Maple Leafs)
Chicago Blackhawks
1986–87	1986–87	Campbell	Norris	3rd	80	29	37	14	—	72	290	310	4	0	4	—	6	15	Lost in division semifinals, 0–4 (Red Wings)
1987–88	1987–88	Campbell	Norris	3rd	80	30	41	9	—	69	284	328	5	1	4	—	17	21	Lost in division semifinals, 1–4 (Blues)
1988–89	1988–89	Campbell	Norris	4th	80	27	41	12	—	66	297	335	16	9	7	—	52	45	Won in division semifinals, 4–2 (Red Wings); Won in division finals, 4–1 (Blues); Lost in conference finals, 1–4 (Flames)
1989–90	1989–90	Campbell	Norris↑	1st	80	41	33	6	—	88	316	294	20	10	10	—	69	65	Won in division semifinals, 4–3 (North Stars); Won in division finals, 4–3 (Blues); Lost in conference finals, 2–4 (Oilers)
1990–91	1990–91	Campbell	Norris↑	1st	80	49	23	8	—	106#	284	211	6	2	4	—	16	23	Lost in division semifinals, 2–4 (North Stars)
1991–92	1991–92	Campbell‡	Norris	2nd	80	36	29	15	—	87	257	236	18	12	6	—	65	48	Won in division semifinals, 4–2 (Blues); Won in division finals, 4–0 (Red Wings); Won in conference finals, 4–0 (Oilers); Lost in Stanley Cup Final, 0–4 (Penguins)
1992–93	1992–93	Campbell	Norris↑	1st	84	47	25	12	—	106	279	230	4	0	4	—	6	13	Lost in division semifinals, 0–4 (Blues)
1993–94	1993–94	Western	Central	5th	84	39	36	9	—	87	254	240	6	2	4	—	10	15	Lost in conference quarterfinals, 2–4 (Maple Leafs)
1994–95^{2}	1994–95	Western	Central	3rd	48	24	19	5	—	53	156	115	16	9	7	—	45	39	Won in conference quarterfinals, 4–3 (Maple Leafs); Won in conference semifinals, 4–0 (Canucks); Lost in conference finals, 1–4 (Red Wings)
1995–96	1995–96	Western	Central	2nd	82	40	28	14	—	94	273	220	10	6	4	—	30	28	Won in conference quarterfinals, 4–0 (Flames); Lost in conference semifinals, 2–4 (Avalanche)
1996–97	1996–97	Western	Central	5th	82	34	35	13	—	81	223	210	6	2	4	—	14	28	Lost in conference quarterfinals, 2–4 (Avalanche)
1997–98	1997–98	Western	Central	5th	82	30	39	13	—	73	192	199	—	—	—	—	—	—	Did not qualify
1998–99	1998–99	Western	Central	3rd	82	29	41	12	—	70	202	248	—	—	—	—	—	—	Did not qualify
1999–2000	1999–2000	Western	Central	3rd	82	33	37	10	2	78	242	245	—	—	—	—	—	—	Did not qualify
2000–01	2000–01	Western	Central	4th	82	29	40	8	5	71	190	233	—	—	—	—	—	—	Did not qualify
2001–02	2001–02	Western	Central	3rd	82	41	27	13	1	96	216	207	5	1	4	—	5	13	Lost in conference quarterfinals, 1–4 (Blues)
2002–03	2002–03	Western	Central	3rd	82	30	33	13	6	79	207	226	—	—	—	—	—	—	Did not qualify
2003–04	2003–04	Western	Central	5th	82	20	43	11	8	59	188	259	—	—	—	—	—	—	Did not qualify
2004–05^{3}	2004–05	Season cancelled due to 2004–05 NHL Lockout																	
2005–06^{4}	2005–06	Western	Central	4th	82	26	43	—	13	65	209	279	—	—	—	—	—	—	Did not qualify
2006–07	2006–07	Western	Central	5th	82	31	42	—	9	71	195	251	—	—	—	—	—	—	Did not qualify
2007–08	2007–08	Western	Central	3rd	82	40	34	—	8	88	234	231	—	—	—	—	—	—	Did not qualify
2008–09	2008–09	Western	Central	2nd	82	46	24	—	12	104	260	209	17	9	8	—	54	54	Won in conference quarterfinals, 4–2 (Flames); Won in conference semifinals, 4–2 (Canucks); Lost in conference finals, 1–4 (Red Wings)
2009–10	2009–10	Western‡	Central↑	1st	82	52	22	—	8	112	262	203	22	16	6	—	78	62	Won in conference quarterfinals, 4–2 (Predators); Won in conference semifinals, 4–2 (Canucks); Won in conference finals, 4–0 (Sharks); Won in Stanley Cup Final, 4–2 (Flyers)†
2010–11	2010–11	Western	Central	3rd	82	44	29	—	9	97	252	220	7	3	4	—	22	16	Lost in conference quarterfinals, 3–4 (Canucks)
2011–12	2011–12	Western	Central	4th	82	45	26	—	11	101	241	231	6	2	4	—	12	17	Lost in conference quarterfinals, 2–4 (Coyotes)
2012–13^{5}	2012–13	Western‡	Central↑	1st	48	36	7	—	5	77#	149	97	23	16	7	—	64	48	Won in conference quarterfinals, 4–1 (Wild); Won in conference semifinals, 4–3 (Red Wings); Won in conference finals, 4–1 (Kings); Won in Stanley Cup Final, 4–2 (Bruins)†
2013–14	2013–14	Western	Central	3rd	82	46	21	—	15	107	261	212	19	11	8	—	58	55	Won in first round, 4–2 (Blues); Won in second round, 4–2 (Wild); Lost in conference finals, 3–4 (Kings)
2014–15	2014–15	Western‡	Central	3rd	82	48	28	—	6	102	220	186	23	16	7	—	69	60	Won in first round, 4–2 (Predators); Won in second round, 4–0 (Wild); Won in conference finals, 4–3 (Ducks); Won in Stanley Cup Final, 4–2 (Lightning)†
2015–16	2015–16	Western	Central	3rd	82	47	26	—	9	103	234	207	7	3	4	—	20	19	Lost in first round, 3–4 (Blues)
2016–17	2016–17	Western	Central↑	1st	82	50	23	—	9	109	240	212	4	0	4	—	3	13	Lost in first round, 0–4 (Predators)
2017–18	2017–18	Western	Central	7th	82	33	39	—	10	76	228	254	—	—	—	—	—	—	Did not qualify
2018–19	2018–19	Western	Central	6th	82	36	34	—	12	84	267	291	—	—	—	—	—	—	Did not qualify
2019–20^{6}	2019–20	Western	Central	7th	70	32	30	—	8	72	208	214	9	4	5	—	27	30	Won in qualifying round, 3–1 (Oilers); Lost in first round, 1–4 (Golden Knights)
2020–21^{7}	2020–21	—	Central	6th	56	24	25	—	7	55	159	184	—	—	—	—	—	—	Did not qualify
2021–22	2021–22	Western	Central	7th	82	28	42	—	12	68	213	289	—	—	—	—	—	—	Did not qualify
2022–23	2022–23	Western	Central	8th	82	26	49	—	7	59	202	299	—	—	—	—	—	—	Did not qualify
2023–24	2023–24	Western	Central	8th	82	23	53	—	6	52	178	289	—	—	—	—	—	—	Did not qualify
2024–25	2024–25	Western	Central	8th	82	25	46	—	11	61	224	292	—	—	—	—	—	—	Did not qualify
2025–26	2025–26	Western	Central	8th	82	29	39	—	14	72	210	270	—	—	—	—	—	—	Did not qualify
Totals					6,970	2,943	2,990	303	223	6,923	20,578	21,140	548	268	275	5	1,566	1,669	63 playoff appearances

^{1} From 1927 to 1936 quarterfinals and semifinals series were played with a two-game total goals format.
^{2} Season was shortened due to the 1994–95 NHL lockout.
^{3} Season was cancelled due to the 2004–05 NHL lockout.
^{4} As of the 2005–06 NHL season, all games will have a winner; the OTL column includes SOL (shootout losses).
^{5} Season was shortened due to the 2012–13 NHL lockout.
^{6} The 2019–20 NHL season was suspended on March 12, 2020 due to the COVID-19 pandemic.
^{7} Season was shortened due to the COVID-19 pandemic.

=== All-time records ===
Statistic	GP	W	L	T	OT
Regular season record (1926–present)	6,888	2,914	2,951	814	209
Postseason record (1926–present)	548	268	275	5	—
All-time regular and postseason record	7,436	3,182	3,226	819	209
All-time series record: 57–57
