= Bryan Davis =

Bryan Davis may refer to:

- Bryan Davis (cricketer) (born 1940), former West Indian cricketer
- Bryan Davis (author) (born 1958), American Christian fantasy author
- Bryan Davis (inventor) (born 1981), American inventor and distiller
- Bryan Davis (basketball) (born 1986), American basketball player

== See also ==
- Brian Davis (disambiguation)
