= Brian Davies (rugby union) =

- Full name: David Brian Davies
- Born: 7 July 1941 Weston-super-Mare, England
- Died: 27 September 2020 (aged 79)
- School: Llanelli Grammar School
- University: Swansea University
- Notable relative: Idwal Davies (father)
- Occupation: Lecturer

Rugby union career
- Position: Centre
International career
Years	Team	Apps	(Points)
1962–63	Wales	3	(0)

David Brian Davies (7 July 1941 — 27 September 2020) was a Welsh international rugby union player.

Davies was born in Weston-super-Mare and grew up in Leeds, where his father Idwal (a dual-code international) was playing rugby league for Leeds RLFC. He completed his schooling at Llanelli Grammar, winning Wales Secondary Schools representative honours in both 1959 and 1960. His early rugby was played with Llanelli and Cardiff.

A centre, Davies was capped three times by Wales, debuting in a draw against Ireland at Lansdowne Road during the 1962 Five Nations Championship. He made two appearances in the 1963 Five Nations.

Davies spent 30 years lecturing in civil engineering at the University of Glamorgan.

== See also ==
- List of Wales national rugby union players
