= Andy MacWilliams =

American sportscaster

Andrew P. MacWilliams is a retired American sportscaster who worked primarily in Cincinnati.

== Early life ==
MacWilliams was born in Albany, New York and graduated from The Albany Academy. He got his start in broadcasting at Williams College, where he called baseball games and hosted a sports show. He transferred to Syracuse University, where he anchored sports and news programs on the campus station. During his senior year, MacWilliams was the play-by-play announcer for the Syracuse Blazers of the Eastern Hockey League.

== Career ==
After graduating, MacWilliams became the public relations director and radio announcer for the Jacksonville Barons of the American Hockey League. He returned to Syracuse in 1974 when the Barons relocated and became the Syracuse Eagles. In 1975, he became the play-by-play announcer for the Cincinnati Stingers of the World Hockey Association. In 1978, MacWilliams became the radio and television announcer for the Chicago Blackhawks of the National Hockey League. While in Chicago, MacWilliams began suffering from a throat condition (spasmodic dysphonia), which led to his color commentator filling-in for him on multiple occasions. He was replaced in 1980 by Pat Foley and returned to Cincinnati to work for WLW. In addition to being the station's sports director, MacWilliams was also the play-by-play announcer for Xavier Musketeers men's basketball (1983–97) and the Cincinnati Reds (1987) and color commentator for Cincinnati Bengals (1981) and Cincinnati Cyclones (1994-95). He was fired by the station in 1997 due to issues with his voice caused by his spasmodic dysphonia.

Since leaving WLW, MacWillams has worked as a financial consultant with Citigroup's Smith Barney group and called high school football games in Cincinnati.
