= Chris Boden (sports reporter) =

American sports reporter

Chris Boden is a veteran American sports reporter and anchor, who is now featured on WGN-TV in Chicago after four years as the Radio Studio Host for the Chicago Blackhawks.

From 2007 through August 2017, he was an anchor and reporter for Comcast SportsNet, where he handled reporting duties on SportsNet Central along with hosting the network's Chicago Bears coverage. Beginning with the 2013 football season, he'd hosted Bears Pregame Live, Bears Postgame Live, Bears Recap, Bears Huddle, and Bears Blitz.

Prior to his Bears hosting duties, Boden was responsible for the CSN pre- and post-game coverage, as well as on-ice reporting duties for the Chicago Blackhawks.

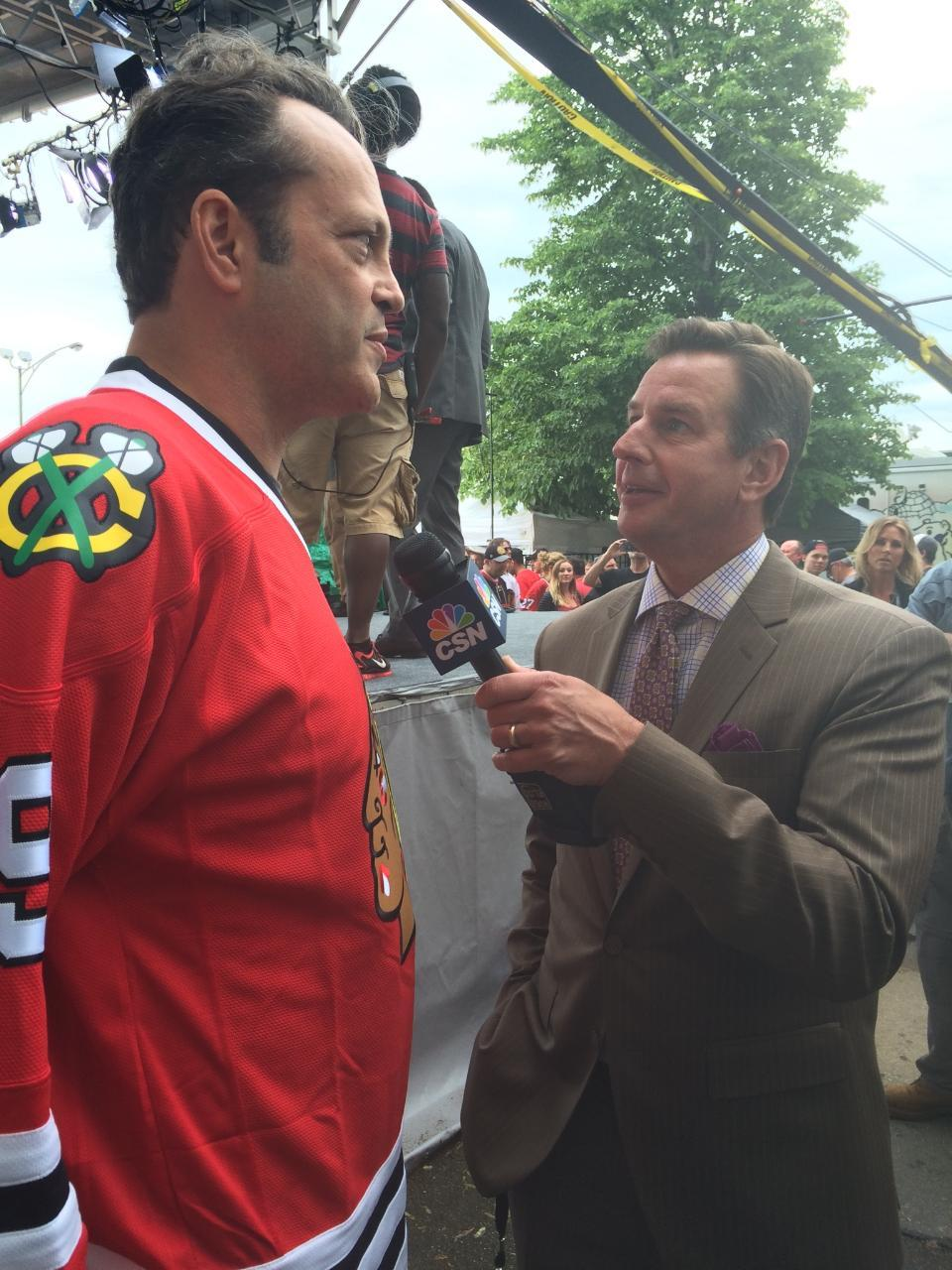
Chris Boden interviews actor Vince Vaughn before a 2015 Chicago Blackhawks Stanley Cup game at the United Center in Chicago.

Early in his career, Boden worked for the telephone sports reporting service SportsPhone Chicago. He worked for more than 30 years covering local and national sports on both radio and television. In television, he has worked for the NFL Network, WFLD-TV (Fox Chicago), WBBM-TV (CBS Chicago), and CLTV (Chicago); his radio credits include WMVP-AM 1000 (ESPN Radio Chicago), WBBM-AM (CBS Chicago), Tribune Radio Networks (now Illinois News Networks, Chicago), WGN-AM (Chicago), and WCRX-FM (Chicago).

Boden left CSN Chicago in August 2017 and changed his Twitter account from @CSNBoden to @BodenTweets. In October 2017, he joined the Chicago Blackhawks as their Radio Studio Host. In January 2018, Boden joined WGN Radio for their “Blackhawks Crazy” podcast as a co-host.

== Biography ==
Boden grew up in the Chicago suburb of Burbank, IL, and graduated with a degree in Broadcast Journalism from Columbia College Chicago. He attended Luther High School South in Chicago, where he played football, basketball, and ran cross-country and track. He was elected into the Luther South High School Hall of Fame in 2000 and received the school's Lifetime Achievement award.
