= Steve Konroyd =

Canadian ice hockey player

- Born: February 10, 1961 (age 65) Scarborough, Ontario, Canada
- Height: 6 ft 1 in (185 cm)
- Weight: 195 lb (88 kg; 13 st 13 lb)
- Position: Defence
- Shot: Left
- Played for: Calgary Flames; New York Islanders; Chicago Blackhawks; Hartford Whalers; Detroit Red Wings; Ottawa Senators
- National team: Canada
- NHL draft: 39th overall, 1980; Calgary Flames
- Playing career: 1981–1995

Stephen Mark Konroyd (born February 10, 1961) is a Canadian former professional ice hockey defenceman. He formerly served as a co-host of intermission and post-game segments on NBC Sports Chicago broadcasts of Chicago Blackhawks' games.

== Playing career ==
Konroyd started his NHL career in 1981 with the Calgary Flames. Over the course of his NHL career, he would spend time with the New York Islanders, Chicago Blackhawks, Hartford Whalers, Detroit Red Wings and Ottawa Senators.

Konroyd was a sound positional defenceman who could also make crisp outlet passes to his forwards. He played nearly 900 regular season games with six different clubs.

As a junior, Konroyd played three years with the Oshawa Generals where he was captain and accumulated 125 points. The steady blueliner was chosen 39th overall by the Calgary Flames in the 1980 NHL entry draft. They gave him a four-game look in 1980–81 before sending him back to junior where he scored 68 points in 59 games. Following that strong showing, he was voted to the OHL second all-star team.

Beginning in 1981–82, Konroyd played nearly five years as a regular on the Flames' blueline. His steady play made him an asset for Canada when they won the silver medal at the 1985 World Championships. The Flames were competitive during this period but were overshadowed by the success of the high-flying Edmonton Oilers. Prior to the trading deadline in 1986, Konroyd and Richard Kromm were sent to the New York Islanders for Stanley Cup veteran John Tonelli.

Konroyd solidified the Islanders' defence for nearly two and a half years until he was traded to the Chicago Blackhawks in November 1988. Now that he was no longer as mobile as in his younger days, the close-checking style of the Hawks suited his game. Konroyd was a solid defender on Chicago when they led the NHL in regular-season points in 1990–91. Following the Hawks' first-round upset at the hands of the Minnesota North Stars, Konroyd joined team Canada at the 1991 World Championships and won another silver medal. Halfway through the next season, he was traded to the Hartford Whalers for Rob Brown. Konroyd later served as a role player for Detroit, Ottawa, and Calgary before retiring in 1995.

After retiring, in 1996-'97 Konroyd became the 1st ever radio color analyst for the Phoenix Coyotes for one year, and then landed the TV color analyst job with the San Jose Sharks from 1997-2000. In 2000 he became the TV color analyst for the Columbus Blue Jackets for 4 years. Konroyd then took on the job of TV studio analyst and part-time TV color analyst with the Chicago Blackhawks from 2005-2021. Konroyd currently is a studio analyst for the NHL Network & Notre Dame Hockey on Peacock, and in 2026 became the Blackhawks' full-time radio color analyst alongside John Wiedeman.

During his TV stint with the Blackhawks, Konroyd and his family resided in Hinsdale, Illinois. He and his wife Juli, a Chicago native, have five grown children, Danielle, Emily, Declan, Braelyn and Stephen; and three grandchildren.

== Career statistics ==
=== Regular season and playoffs ===
			Regular season					Playoffs
Season	Team	League	GP	G	A	Pts	PIM	GP	G	A	Pts	PIM
1977–78	Markham Waxers	OPJHL	28	4	15	19	28	—	—	—	—	—
1978–79	Oshawa Generals	OMJHL	65	4	19	23	63	5	1	2	3	14
1979–80	Oshawa Generals	OMJHL	62	11	23	34	133	7	0	2	2	14
1980–81	Calgary Flames	NHL	4	0	0	0	4	—	—	—	—	—
1980–81	Oshawa Generals	OHL	59	19	49	68	232	11	3	11	14	35
1981–82	Calgary Flames	NHL	63	3	14	17	78	3	0	0	0	12
1981–82	Oklahoma City Stars	CHL	14	2	3	5	15	—	—	—	—	—
1982–83	Calgary Flames	NHL	79	4	13	17	73	9	2	1	3	18
1983–84	Calgary Flames	NHL	80	1	13	14	94	8	1	2	3	8
1984–85	Calgary Flames	NHL	64	3	23	26	73	4	1	4	5	2
1985–86	Calgary Flames	NHL	59	7	20	27	64	—	—	—	—	—
1985–86	New York Islanders	NHL	14	0	5	5	16	3	0	0	0	6
1986–87	New York Islanders	NHL	72	5	16	21	70	14	1	4	5	10
1987–88	New York Islanders	NHL	62	2	15	17	99	6	1	0	1	4
1988–89	New York Islanders	NHL	21	1	5	6	2	—	—	—	—	—
1988–89	Chicago Blackhawks	NHL	57	5	7	12	40	16	2	0	2	10
1989–90	Chicago Blackhawks	NHL	75	3	14	17	34	20	1	3	4	19
1990–91	Chicago Blackhawks	NHL	70	0	12	12	40	6	1	0	1	8
1991–92	Chicago Blackhawks	NHL	49	2	14	16	65	—	—	—	—	—
1991–92	Hartford Whalers	NHL	33	2	10	12	32	7	0	1	1	2
1992–93	Hartford Whalers	NHL	59	3	11	14	63	—	—	—	—	—
1992–93	Detroit Red Wings	NHL	6	0	1	1	4	1	0	0	0	0
1993–94	Detroit Red Wings	NHL	19	0	0	0	10	—	—	—	—	—
1993–94	Ottawa Senators	NHL	8	0	2	2	2	—	—	—	—	—
1994–95	Chicago Wolves	IHL	16	2	2	4	4	3	0	1	1	2
1994–95	Calgary Flames	NHL	1	0	0	0	0	—	—	—	—	—
NHL totals			895	41	195	236	863	97	10	15	25	99

=== International ===
Year	Team	Event	GP	G	A	Pts	PIM
1985	Canada	WC	10	0	3	3	0
1991	Canada	WC	10	1	3	4	0
Senior totals			20	1	6	7	0
