= Bill Gardner (ice hockey) =

Canadian ice hockey player

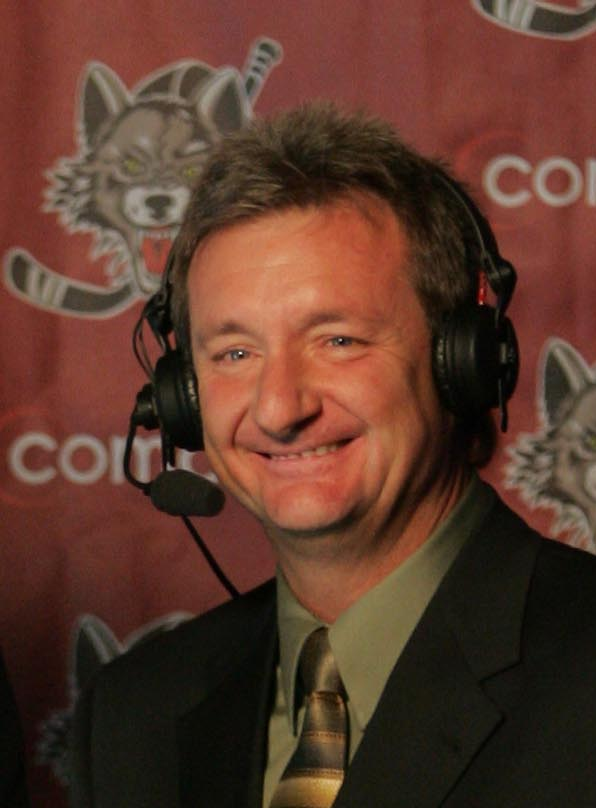
- Born: March 19, 1960 (age 66) Toronto, Ontario, Canada
- Height: 5 ft 10 in (178 cm)
- Weight: 180 lb (82 kg; 12 st 12 lb)
- Position: Center
- Shot: Left
- Played for: Chicago Blackhawks; Hartford Whalers
- National team: Canada
- NHL draft: 49th overall, 1979; Chicago Black Hawks
- Playing career: 1980–1993

William Scott Gardner (born March 19, 1960) is a Canadian former professional ice hockey forward and current color commentator for the Chicago Wolves. He played in the National Hockey League with the Chicago Blackhawks and Hartford Whalers between 1980 and 1989.

== Career ==
Gardner was born in Toronto, Ontario. During the 1976–77 season, Gardner played for the Seneca Nationals alongside future all-time NHL points leader Wayne Gretzky. Gardner won the team's Most Valuable Player award that season, scoring 103 points as a defensemen. Gardner then went on to play for the OHL's Peterborough Petes, where in 1979, the Petes would go on to win the Memorial Cup. Gardner was drafted 49th Overall by the Chicago Blackhawks, just one pick after Mark Messier. Gardner started his National Hockey League career with the Chicago Blackhawks in 1981. He would spend his entire career with the Blackhawks except for 26 games he played for the Hartford Whalers in 1986. During his career, he scored 73 goals, 115 assists, 188 points in 380 games.

Gardner's career as a broadcaster began in 1989 as a studio analyst on SportsChannel Chicago's Blackhawks broadcasts. In 1996, he replaced Daryl Reaugh on Hartford Whalers television broadcasts when Reaugh left to become radio analyst for the Dallas Stars when it looked as if the Whalers might leave Hartford . He followed the Whalers to North Carolina when the team relocated the next season, but left after one season return to the Chicago Blackhawks as the team's color analyst on television and radio. Gardner served as color commentator for the Blackhawks alongside Pat Foley until 2002. He has been the color analyst for the Chicago Wolves since 2002.

== Career statistics ==
=== Regular season and playoffs ===
			Regular season					Playoffs
Season	Team	League	GP	G	A	Pts	PIM	GP	G	A	Pts	PIM
1976–77	Seneca Nationals	MJBHL	68	30	72	103	80	—	—	—	—	—
1976–77	Peterborough Petes	OMJHL	1	0	0	0	0	—	—	—	—	—
1977–78	Peterborough Petes	OMJHL	65	23	32	55	10	21	7	10	17	4
1977–78	Peterborough Petes	M-Cup	—	—	—	—	—	5	4	1	5	0
1978–79	Peterborough Petes	OMJHL	68	33	71	104	19	18	4	20	24	6
1978–79	Peterborough Petes	M-Cup	—	—	—	—	—	5	0	6	6	0
1979–80	Peterborough Petes	OMJHL	59	43	63	106	17	14	13	14	27	8
1979–80	Peterborough Petes	M-Cup	—	—	—	—	—	5	3	5	8	0
1980–81	Chicago Black Hawks	NHL	1	0	0	0	0	—	—	—	—	—
1980–81	New Brunswick Hawks	AHL	48	19	29	48	12	13	5	10	15	0
1981–82	Chicago Black Hawks	NHL	69	8	15	23	20	15	1	4	5	6
1982–83	Chicago Black Hawks	NHL	77	15	25	40	12	13	1	0	1	9
1983–84	Chicago Black Hawks	NHL	79	27	21	48	12	5	0	1	1	0
1984–85	Chicago Black Hawks	NHL	74	17	34	51	12	12	1	3	4	2
1985–86	Chicago Black Hawks	NHL	46	3	10	13	6	—	—	—	—	—
1985–86	Hartford Whalers	NHL	18	1	8	9	4	—	—	—	—	—
1986–87	Hartford Whalers	NHL	8	0	1	1	0	—	—	—	—	—
1986–87	Binghamton Whalers	AHL	50	17	44	61	18	13	4	8	12	14
1987–88	Chicago Blackhawks	NHL	2	1	0	1	2	—	—	—	—	—
1987–88	Saginaw Hawks	IHL	54	18	49	67	46	10	4	4	8	14
1988–89	Chicago Blackhawks	NHL	6	1	1	2	0	—	—	—	—	—
1988–89	Saginaw Hawks	IHL	74	27	45	72	10	6	3	1	4	0
1989–90	Kapfenberger SV	AUT	35	34	47	81	32	—	—	—	—	—
1990–91	ATSE Graz	AUT	38	35	48	83	20	—	—	—	—	—
1990–91	HC Lugano	NLA	2	0	1	1	0	—	—	—	—	—
1991–92	EC Graz	AUT	44	23	74	97	40	—	—	—	—	—
1992–93	EV Landshut	GER	15	4	6	10	34	5	1	3	4	2
1992–93	Innsbrucker EV	AUT	25	17	32	49	—	—	—	—	—	—
NHL totals			380	73	115	188	68	45	3	8	11	17

=== International ===
Year	Team	Event	GP	G	A	Pts	PIM
1980	Canada	WJC	5	0	4	4	14
Junior totals			5	0	4	4	14
