= John Carmichael (sportswriter) =

American sportswriter

- Born: October 16, 1902; Madison, Wisconsin, US
- Died: June 6, 1986 (aged 83); Chicago, Illinois, US
- Occupation: Sportswriter
- Known for: Baseball writing
- Spouses: Marie Bannon (d. 1953); Kay Naughton (m. 1956)
- Children: 1
- Awards: J. G. Taylor Spink Award (1974)

John Peter Carmichael (October 16, 1902 – June 6, 1986) was an American sportswriter for over 40 years, primarily in Chicago.

== Biography ==
Carmichael began his career with the Milwaukee Leader in 1924. He moved to Chicago in 1927, where he wrote for the Chicago Herald-Examiner until 1932, then the Chicago Daily News, where his column "The Barbershop" ran for 38 years. Carmichael became sports editor of the Daily News in 1943. He also served as editor for the Who's Who in the Major Leagues from 1938 to 1954.

Carmichael retired in 1972 and was voted the J. G. Taylor Spink Award, the highest award issued by the Baseball Writers' Association of America (BBWAA), in 1974. Carmichael died in Chicago in June 1986 at age 83. His first wife had died in 1953; he remarried in 1956, and was survived by his second wife and a son.
