= Bryan Davis (author) =

American novelist

- Born: April 21, 1958 (age 68); Norfolk, Virginia, U.S.
- Education: University of Florida (BS)
- Occupation: Author
- Employer(s): AMG, Zondervan
- Known for: Dragons in our Midst
- Spouse: Susie Davis
- Children: 7
- Website: daviscrossing.com

Bryan Davis (born April 21, 1958) is an American Christian fantasy author, his most popular series being Dragons in our Midst, Oracles of Fire, and Children of the Bard. Davis was born in 1958 and grew up in the eastern United States.

Bryan is a graduate of the University of Florida (B.S. in Industrial Engineering). In high school, he was a member of the National Honor Society and voted Most Likely to Succeed. Although he is now a full-time writer, Bryan was a computer professional for over 20 years. In trying to get published he was rejected over 200 times. One of his daughters, Amanda L. Davis, wrote Precisely Terminated, Noble Imposter, and Viral Execution, three books in the Cantral Chronicles series.

Bryan began to focus on writing fantasy after having a dream about a boy who breathed fire. Eventually this grew into Raising Dragons, his first published work of fiction.

== Publications ==
Bryan Davis has written several Christian fiction series and other novels, many of them also Christian.

=== Dragons In Our Midst ===
Dragons in our Midst is an American Christian fantasy book series written by Bryan Davis. It follows the story of Billy Bannister and Bonnie Silver, two modern day American teenagers who each have one parent that was once a dragon. Because of their dragon heritage, they each have unique traits, which they use in their battles against the evil dragon slayers. The first book, Raising Dragons was published in 2004, and the last book, Tears of a Dragon in 2005. A prequel/sequel series, Oracles of Fire was written, beginning with Eye of the Oracle in 2006 and ending with The Bones of Makaidos in 2009. A third series, Children of the Bard, began with Song of the Ovulum in 2011 and ended with Omega Dragon in 2015.

Dragons in our Midst series:

- Raising Dragons (2004)
- The Candlestone (2004)
- Circles of Seven (2005)
- Tears of a Dragon (2005)

Oracles of Fire series:

- Eye of the Oracle (2006) – prequel to the Dragons in our Midst series
- Enoch's Ghost (2007) – sequel to the Dragons in our Midst series
- Last of the Nephilim (2008)
- The Bones of Makaidos (2009)

Children of the Bard series – sequel to the Dragons in our Midst and Oracles of Fire series

- Song of the Ovulum (2011)
- From the Mouth of Elijah (2012)
- The Seventh Door (2014)
- Omega Dragon (2015)

=== Other publications ===
Time Echoes Trilogy:

- Time Echoes (2017)
- Interfinity (2017)
- Fatal Convergence (2017)

Dragons of Starlight series:

- Starlighter (2010)
- Warrior (2011)
- Diviner (2011)
- Liberator (2012)

Tales of Starlight (adult fiction companion series to Dragons of Starlight):

- Masters and Slayers (2010)
- Third Starlighter (2011)
- Exodus Rising (2013)

"Arch Book" series:

- The Day That Jesus Died
- The Story of Jesus' Baptism and Temptation
- The Story of the Empty Tomb
- Jacob's Dream

"Reapers Trilogy":

- Reapers (Scrubjay Journeys) (2014)
- Beyond the Gateway (2015)
- Reaper Reborn (2017)

"Wanted: Superheroes" series:

- Wanted: A Superhero to Save the World (2017)
- Hertz to Be a Hero (2019)
- Antigravity Heroes (2019)

Other books include:

- Spit and Polish for Husbands (2004)
- The Image of a Father (2004)
- I Know Why the Angels Dance (2009)
- Beelzebed (2013)
- The Scent of Her Soul (2018)
- Write Them In (2020)
- Let the Ghosts Speak (2020)
