= Idwal Davies (rugby) =

Wales dual-code rugby international footballer

Personal information
- Full name: David Idwal Davies
- Born: 10 November 1915 Llanelli, Wales
- Died: 7 July 1990 (aged 74) Llanelli, Wales

Playing information

Rugby union
- Position: Centre
Club
Years	Team	Pld	T	G	FG	P
≤1939–≥39	Swansea RFC
Representative
Years	Team	Pld	T	G	FG	P
1939	Wales	1	0	0	0	0

Rugby league
- Position: Centre
Club
Years	Team	Pld	T	G	FG	P
≤1945–≥45	Leeds
Representative
Years	Team	Pld	T	G	FG	P
1945	Wales	1

David Idwal Davies (10 November 1915 – 7 July 1990) was a Welsh dual-code international rugby union, and professional rugby league footballer who played in the 1930s and 1940s. He played representative level rugby union (RU) for Wales, and at club level for Swansea RFC, as a centre, and representative level rugby league (RL) for Wales, and at club level for Leeds, as a centre.

== Background ==
Davies was born in Llanelli district, Wales, he was a Sergeant in the Royal Air Force during World War II, and he died aged 74 in Llanelli, Wales.

== Playing career ==
=== International honours ===
Idwal Davies won a cap for Wales (RU) while at Swansea RFC in the 0–3 defeat by England at Twickenham Stadium, London on Saturday 21 January 1939, and won a cap for Wales (RL) while at Leeds in the 8–18 defeat by England at Central Park, Wigan on Saturday 10 March 1945.
