= Caley Chelios =

American sports commentator

- Born: 1993 (age 32–33); Chicago, Illinois, U.S.
- Education: Northwestern University
- Occupations: Sports journalist, color commentator, lacrosse player

Caley Lynn Chelios (born 1993) is a reporter and studio analyst for the Chicago Blackhawks, and former reporter/radio color commentator for the Tampa Bay Lightning. She has made a number of appearances on the NHL Network and ESPN.

== Early life ==
She was born in Chicago, Illinois. Her father is Hockey Hall of Famer Chris Chelios. Her brothers Dean and Jake Chelios also played hockey for Michigan State University, and Jake briefly played for the Detroit Red Wings of the National Hockey League (NHL). She also has a younger sister named Tara, who like herself, played lacrosse at Northwestern.

== College ==
She accepted a lacrosse scholarship from Northwestern University. She played for four years on the women's lacrosse team and captured an NCAA National Championship in her freshman year and went on to make three consecutive final four appearances. She studied communications and sociology. She entered the Northwestern University's Medill School of Journalism, where she received her master's degree. She had the opportunity to report on many different sporting events including the 2016 NHL Winter Classic and 2016 NFL Draft while in grad school.

== Career ==
Chelios joined the Tampa Bay Lightning as a reporter beginning in the 2016–17 NHL season. She added color commentary duties in her third season with the team during road games. In 2021, she joined NBC Sports to cover the Isobel Cup playoffs. After her husband's retirement from the NFL and the Lightning winning their second straight Stanley Cup, Chelios stepped down from the Lightning after five seasons to focus on her growing family and moving to Chicago. Prior to the 2021–22 season, she joined the Chicago Blackhawks broadcast team as a studio analyst and color commentator. She joined ESPN's coverage of the 2022 Stanley Cup playoffs as a reporter.

== Personal life ==
She is of Greek descent. She met Danny Vitale while both were attending Northwestern University. They were married in Chicago in the summer of 2019. The guest list included Eddie Vedder, John Cusack, and Kid Rock. He was drafted by the Tampa Bay Buccaneers in the 2016 NFL draft in the sixth round. He played for the Cleveland Browns, Green Bay Packers, and New England Patriots in four seasons before retiring in 2021. She announced in January 2020 that she and Danny were expecting their first child in April 2020, and that she would miss out on the remaining road trips for the rest of the 2019–20 NHL season. She gave birth to a daughter, Isabella. In September 2021, the couple had their second child; a son named Danny and announced that she will not return to Tampa Bay. On February 27, 2024, she gave birth to her third child, and second daughter, named Sofia; 48 hours after the retirement ceremony of her father's No. 7 jersey by the Chicago Blackhawks.
