= 1948–49 Chicago Black Hawks season =

NHL ice hockey team season

1948–49 Chicago Black Hawks
- League: 5th NHL
- 1948–49 record: 21–31–8
- Home record: 13–12–5
- Road record: 8–19–3
- Goals for: 173
- Goals against: 211

Team information
- General manager: Bill Tobin
- Coach: Charlie Conacher
- Captain: Gaye Stewart
- Arena: Chicago Stadium

Team leaders
- Goals: Roy Conacher (26)
- Assists: Doug Bentley (43)
- Points: Roy Conacher (69)
- Penalty minutes: Bep Guidolin (116)
- Wins: Jim Henry (21)
- Goals against average: Jim Henry (3.52)

The 1948–49 Chicago Black Hawks season was the team's 23rd season in the National Hockey League (NHL). The Black Hawks finished fifth and did not qualify for the playoffs.

== Regular season ==
The Black Hawks were coming off a last-place finish in the 1947–48 season, failing to qualify for post-season play for the second straight year. The Black Hawks would get off to a bad start, losing their first four games, before making a trade with the Detroit Red Wings. The Hawks sent Bud Poile and Hully Gee to Detroit in exchange for Jim Conacher, Doug McCaig, and Bep Guidolin. The trade would initially pay off, as the Black Hawks would post a 14–9–2 record in the next 25 games. However, they slumped again, winning only seven of their remaining 21 games and missing the playoffs for the third straight season, finishing in fifth place, seven points behind the Toronto Maple Leafs for the final playoff spot.

Offensively, the Hawks were led by Roy Conacher, who would win the Art Ross Trophy as he led the NHL with 68 points, scoring a team high 26 goals. Doug Bentley would finish just behind Conacher, with 66 points, including an NHL high 43 assists. Jim Conacher played a solid season, earning 48 points in 55 games. Defenseman Ralph Nattrass led the Hawks' blue line with 14 points, while Bep Guidolin had a team high 116 penalty minutes.

In goal, Jim Henry, who the Hawks acquired from the New York Rangers in exchange for Emile Francis and Alex Kaleta in the off-season, received all the action, winning 21 games and posting a GAA of 3.52.

=== Season standings ===
National Hockey League
		GP	W	L	T	GF	GA	DIFF	Pts
1	Detroit Red Wings	60	34	19	7	195	145	+50	75
2	Boston Bruins	60	29	23	8	178	163	+15	66
3	Montreal Canadiens	60	28	23	9	152	126	+26	65
4	Toronto Maple Leafs	60	22	25	13	147	161	−14	57
5	Chicago Black Hawks	60	21	31	8	173	211	−38	50
6	New York Rangers	60	18	31	11	133	172	−39	47

=== Record vs. opponents ===
1948–49 NHL Records
Team	BOS	CHI	DET	MTL	NYR	TOR
Boston	—	6–5–1	5–4–3	5–6–1	8–2–2	5–6–1
Chicago	5–6–1	—	3–9	3–7–2	6–5–1	4–4–4
Detroit	4–5–3	9–3	—	7–4–1	7–4–1	7–3–2
Montreal	6–5–1	7–3–2	4–7–1	—	5–4–3	6–4–2
New York	2–8–2	5–6–1	4–7–1	4–5–3	—	3–5–4
Toronto	6–5–1	4–4–4	3–7–2	4–6–2	5–3–4	—

== Schedule and results ==
=== Regular season ===
1948–49 regular season
October

Game	Date	Visitor	Score	Home	Record	Points
1	October 13	Chicago Black Hawks	1–4	Detroit Red Wings	0–1–0	0
2	October 16	Chicago Black Hawks	2–8	Montreal Canadiens	0–2–0	0
3	October 20	Chicago Black Hawks	3–8	Boston Bruins	0–3–0	0
4	October 23	Chicago Black Hawks	1–6	Toronto Maple Leafs	0–4–0	0
5	October 28	Boston Bruins	5–1	Chicago Black Hawks	0–5–0	0
6	October 31	Toronto Maple Leafs	1–2	Chicago Black Hawks	1–5–0	2

November

Game	Date	Visitor	Score	Home	Record	Points
7	November 7	New York Rangers	2–4	Chicago Black Hawks	2–5–0	4
8	November 10	Chicago Black Hawks	3–4	New York Rangers	2–6–0	4
9	November 11	Chicago Black Hawks	1–4	Montreal Canadiens	2–7–0	4
10	November 13	Chicago Black Hawks	6–3	Toronto Maple Leafs	3–7–0	6
11	November 14	Detroit Red Wings	3–1	Chicago Black Hawks	3–8–0	6
12	November 17	Montreal Canadiens	3–4	Chicago Black Hawks	4–8–0	8
13	November 21	Toronto Maple Leafs	3–3	Chicago Black Hawks	4–8–1	9
14	November 25	New York Rangers	4–6	Chicago Black Hawks	5–8–1	11
15	November 27	Chicago Black Hawks	5–3	Detroit Red Wings	6–8–1	13
16	November 28	Detroit Red Wings	9–6	Chicago Black Hawks	6–9–1	13
17	November 30	Chicago Black Hawks	4–2	New York Rangers	7–9–1	15

December

Game	Date	Visitor	Score	Home	Record	Points
18	December 1	Chicago Black Hawks	1–5	Boston Bruins	7–10–1	15
19	December 4	Chicago Black Hawks	6–4	Toronto Maple Leafs	8–10–1	17
20	December 5	Toronto Maple Leafs	2–0	Chicago Black Hawks	8–11–1	17
21	December 8	Boston Bruins	3–4	Chicago Black Hawks	9–11–1	19
22	December 11	Chicago Black Hawks	5–2	Montreal Canadiens	10–11–1	21
23	December 12	Montreal Canadiens	4–4	Chicago Black Hawks	10–11–2	22
24	December 15	Detroit Red Wings	1–5	Chicago Black Hawks	11–11–2	24
25	December 19	Boston Bruins	2–7	Chicago Black Hawks	12–11–2	26
26	December 23	New York Rangers	3–2	Chicago Black Hawks	12–12–2	26
27	December 25	Chicago Black Hawks	1–2	Boston Bruins	12–13–2	26
28	December 26	Chicago Black Hawks	2–1	New York Rangers	13–13–2	28

January

Game	Date	Visitor	Score	Home	Record	Points
29	January 1	Detroit Red Wings	3–5	Chicago Black Hawks	14–13–2	30
30	January 2	Chicago Black Hawks	3–5	Detroit Red Wings	14–14–2	30
31	January 5	Chicago Black Hawks	1–3	New York Rangers	14–15–2	30
32	January 6	Chicago Black Hawks	2–7	Montreal Canadiens	14–16–2	30
33	January 8	Chicago Black Hawks	3–3	Toronto Maple Leafs	14–16–3	31
34	January 9	Boston Bruins	2–4	Chicago Black Hawks	15–16–3	33
35	January 15	Chicago Black Hawks	1–7	Montreal Canadiens	15–17–3	33
36	January 16	Chicago Black Hawks	1–3	Boston Bruins	15–18–3	33
37	January 19	Chicago Black Hawks	1–2	Detroit Red Wings	15–19–3	33
38	January 23	New York Rangers	2–2	Chicago Black Hawks	15–19–4	34
39	January 26	Montreal Canadiens	3–2	Chicago Black Hawks	15–20–4	34
40	January 29	Chicago Black Hawks	4–4	Toronto Maple Leafs	15–20–5	35
41	January 30	Toronto Maple Leafs	2–4	Chicago Black Hawks	16–20–5	37

February

Game	Date	Visitor	Score	Home	Record	Points
42	February 2	Chicago Black Hawks	4–6	Detroit Red Wings	16–21–5	37
43	February 3	Detroit Red Wings	4–2	Chicago Black Hawks	16–22–5	37
44	February 6	New York Rangers	2–0	Chicago Black Hawks	16–23–5	37
45	February 9	Chicago Black Hawks	3–5	Boston Bruins	16–24–5	37
46	February 10	Chicago Black Hawks	3–1	New York Rangers	17–24–5	39
47	February 13	Montreal Canadiens	3–4	Chicago Black Hawks	18–24–5	41
48	February 16	Boston Bruins	1–5	Chicago Black Hawks	19–24–5	43
49	February 20	Toronto Maple Leafs	4–3	Chicago Black Hawks	19–25–5	43
50	February 24	Montreal Canadiens	3–1	Chicago Black Hawks	19–26–5	43
51	February 26	Chicago Black Hawks	2–2	Toronto Maple Leafs	19–26–6	44
52	February 27	Boston Bruins	2–2	Chicago Black Hawks	19–26–7	45

March

Game	Date	Visitor	Score	Home	Record	Points
53	March 2	New York Rangers	2–5	Chicago Black Hawks	20–26–7	47
54	March 5	Chicago Black Hawks	5–6	Detroit Red Wings	20–27–7	47
55	March 6	Detroit Red Wings	6–2	Chicago Black Hawks	20–28–7	47
56	March 9	Montreal Canadiens	2–2	Chicago Black Hawks	20–28–8	48
57	March 13	Toronto Maple Leafs	3–1	Chicago Black Hawks	20–29–8	48
58	March 16	Chicago Black Hawks	4–3	Boston Bruins	21–29–8	50
59	March 19	Chicago Black Hawks	1–5	Montreal Canadiens	21–30–8	50
60	March 20	Chicago Black Hawks	1–5	New York Rangers	21–31–8	50

Legend: Win (2 points) Loss (0 points) Tie (1 point)

== Awards and records ==
- Roy Conacher – Art Ross Trophy, First Team All-Star
- Doug Bentley – Second Team All-Star

== Player statistics ==
=== Scoring leaders ===
Player	GP	G	A	Pts	PIM
Roy Conacher	60	26	42	68	8
Doug Bentley	58	23	43	66	38
Jim Conacher	55	25	23	48	41
Gus Bodnar	59	19	26	45	14
Bill Mosienko	60	17	25	42	6

=== Goaltending ===
Player	GP	TOI	W	L	T	GA	SO	GAA
Jim Henry	60	3600	21	31	8	211	0	3.52
