= Joe Wilson (sportscaster) =

Joseph S. Wilson (May 7, 1911 – October 20, 1983) was an American sports announcer from Chicago known for his coverage of bowling.

== Career ==
Wilson was born on May 7, 1911, in Eveleth, Minnesota. He graduated from Northwestern University and began his broadcasting career at a radio station in Virginia, Minnesota. His first play-by-play experience came when the station had him call a hockey game. In 1941, he moved to Cleveland, where he called Cleveland Rams and Cleveland Barons games. In 1943, he became sports director of the Blue Network's (later the American Broadcasting Company) central division. During this time, Wilson served as a color commentator alongside Harry Wismer for the network's college football broadcasts.

In 1944, Wilson appeared on a number of experimental broadcasts on WBKB-TV. In 1948, Wilson left ABC to work for WBKB full-time. He called a number of sports for the station, including Chicago Cubs baseball, Chicago Blackhawks hockey, harness racing from Maywood Park, college football and basketball, boxing, golf, pool, and midget car racing. He also co-hosted a game show, anchored newscasts, and acted in televised plays. In 1949, he called college football games nationally for the DuMont Television Network.

Wilson moved to WMAQ-TV in 1952 and the following year began hosting the station's bowling program. He was the play-by-play announcer for a number of NBC's nationally aired bowling programs, including 1956's National Championship Bowling, as well as the syndicated Bowling Stars.

In 1952 and 1959, Wilson was a play-by-play announcer for Mutual Broadcasting System's Game of the Day baseball broadcasts.

In 1968, Wilson joined the Oakland Seals of the National Hockey League as director of publicity and promotion.

Wilson died on October 20, 1983, in Geneva, Illinois.
