= 1962–63 Chicago Black Hawks season =

National Hockey League team season

1962–63 Chicago Black Hawks
- League: 2nd NHL
- 1962–63 record: 32–21–17
- Home record: 17–9–9
- Road record: 15–12–8
- Goals for: 194
- Goals against: 178

Team information
- General manager: Tommy Ivan
- Coach: Rudy Pilous
- Captain: Pierre Pilote
- Arena: Chicago Stadium

Team leaders
- Goals: Stan Mikita and Bobby Hull (31)
- Assists: Stan Mikita (45)
- Points: Stan Mikita (76)
- Penalty minutes: Eric Nesterenko (103)
- Wins: Glenn Hall (30)
- Goals against average: Glenn Hall (2.47)

The 1962–63 Chicago Black Hawks season was the Hawks' 37th season in the NHL, and the club was coming off a third-place finish for the fourth consecutive season in 1961–62, as Chicago won a team record 31 games and tied a club record with 75 points. The Hawks would go on and upset the heavily favored Montreal Canadiens in the NHL semi-finals for the second straight season, however, the Black Hawks would lose to the Toronto Maple Leafs in the 1962 Stanley Cup Finals.

During the off-season, the Black Hawks and Toronto Maple Leafs reportedly came to agreement which would see the Hawks acquire Frank Mahovlich from Toronto for $1 million, however, the deal was nixed when Maple Leafs general manager Punch Imlach, on the advice from Conn Smythe, refused the deal, stating that $1 million does not score goals.

Chicago started the year off hovering around the .500 level through their first 12 games, as they had a record of 5–4–3. Goaltender Glenn Hall, who had played an NHL record 502 consecutive games, injured his back early in November and suffered a pinch nerve, and was relieved by backup Denis DeJordy in a game against the Boston Bruins. Hall would miss the next game against the Montreal Canadiens, ending his streak, however, the Hawks won the game by a 3–1 score. Hall would rebound from his injury, and the team would play very good hockey for the remainder of the season, winning a team record 32 games, and also setting a club record with 81 points, and finishing in second place in the NHL standings for the first time since they finished second in the American Division back in 1935.

Offensively, the Hawks were led by Stan Mikita, who led the team with 45 assists and 76 points, and tied Bobby Hull for the team lead in goals, with 31. Hull added 31 assists to his goal total to finish second in team scoring with 62 points, while Ab McDonald set a career high with 61 points, as he scored 20 goals and added 41 assists. On defense, Pierre Pilote led the way, scoring 8 goals and 26 points, along with superb defensive play, as he won the Norris Trophy. Eric Nesterenko provided the team toughness, as he had a team high 103 penalty minutes.

In goal, Glenn Hall played the majority of the games, winning 30 of them, while posting an NHL best GAA of 2.47, and earning 5 shutouts. Hall would win the Vezina Trophy, as Chicago had the fewest goals against during the season.

The Hawks would face the Detroit Red Wings in the NHL semi-finals, as Detroit finished fourth in the NHL with a record of 32–25–13, earning 77 points, and only 4 behind Chicago. The series opened up at Chicago Stadium for the opening two games, and the Black Hawks took advantage, taking a 2–0 series lead a close 5–4 victory in the series opener, followed by a 5–2 win in the second game. The series shifted to the Detroit Olympia for the next two games, and the Red Wings responded, defeating the Black Hawks 4–2 and 4–1 to even the series up. Detroit continued their good play in the fifth game in Chicago, doubling the Hawks 4–2 to take a 3–2 series lead. The sixth game was played back in Detroit, and the Red Wings had no problems closing the series out, easily beating the Black Hawks 7–4, as Chicago was eliminated in the NHL semi-finals for the first time since 1960.

== Season standings ==
National Hockey League
		GP	W	L	T	GF	GA	DIFF	Pts
1	Toronto Maple Leafs	70	35	23	12	221	180	+41	82
2	Chicago Black Hawks	70	32	21	17	194	178	+16	81
3	Montreal Canadiens	70	28	19	23	225	183	+42	79
4	Detroit Red Wings	70	32	25	13	200	194	+6	77
5	New York Rangers	70	22	36	12	211	233	−22	56
6	Boston Bruins	70	14	39	17	198	281	−83	45

=== Record vs. opponents ===
1962–63 NHL Records
Team	BOS	CHI	DET	MTL	NYR	TOR
Boston	—	2–10–2	2–7–5	2–7–5	4–7–3	4–8–2
Chicago	10–2–2	—	5–6–3	3–7–4	10–2–2	4–7–3
Detroit	7–2–5	6–5–3	—	3–9–2	9–3–2	7–6–1
Montreal	7–2–5	7–3–4	9–3–2	—	5–5–4	3–6–5
New York	7–4–3	2–10–2	3–9–2	5–5–4	—	5–8–1
Toronto	8–4–2	7–4–3	6–7–1	6–3–5	8–5–1	—

== Schedule and results ==
=== Regular season ===
1962–63 regular season
October

Game	Date	Visitor	Score	Home	Record	Points
1	October 10	Toronto Maple Leafs	3–1	Chicago Black Hawks	0–1–0	0
2	October 13	Detroit Red Wings	0–0	Chicago Black Hawks	0–1–1	1
3	October 14	Chicago Black Hawks	2–2	Boston Bruins	0–1–2	2
4	October 17	Chicago Black Hawks	5–1	New York Rangers	1–1–2	4
5	October 20	Chicago Black Hawks	1–3	Toronto Maple Leafs	1–2–2	4
6	October 21	Chicago Black Hawks	1–3	Detroit Red Wings	1–3–2	4
7	October 23	Montreal Canadiens	4–4	Chicago Black Hawks	1–3–3	5
8	October 27	Chicago Black Hawks	3–2	Montreal Canadiens	2–3–3	7
9	October 28	Chicago Black Hawks	5–3	New York Rangers	3–3–3	9
10	October 30	New York Rangers	3–5	Chicago Black Hawks	4–3–3	11

November

Game	Date	Visitor	Score	Home	Record	Points
11	November 1	Chicago Black Hawks	4–2	Boston Bruins	5–3–3	13
12	November 4	Chicago Black Hawks	1–3	Detroit Red Wings	5–4–3	13
13	November 7	Boston Bruins	3–3	Chicago Black Hawks	5–4–4	14
14	November 10	Chicago Black Hawks	3–1	Montreal Canadiens	6–4–4	16
15	November 11	Toronto Maple Leafs	5–3	Chicago Black Hawks	6–5–4	16
16	November 14	Detroit Red Wings	2–4	Chicago Black Hawks	7–5–4	18
17	November 17	Chicago Black Hawks	4–3	New York Rangers	8–5–4	20
18	November 18	Montreal Canadiens	1–1	Chicago Black Hawks	8–5–5	21
19	November 22	Toronto Maple Leafs	0–1	Chicago Black Hawks	9–5–5	23
20	November 24	Detroit Red Wings	1–1	Chicago Black Hawks	9–5–6	24
21	November 25	Chicago Black Hawks	2–3	Detroit Red Wings	9–6–6	24
22	November 29	Chicago Black Hawks	5–0	Boston Bruins	10–6–6	26

December

Game	Date	Visitor	Score	Home	Record	Points
23	December 1	Chicago Black Hawks	1–2	Montreal Canadiens	10–7–6	26
24	December 2	New York Rangers	1–5	Chicago Black Hawks	11–7–6	28
25	December 5	Boston Bruins	4–5	Chicago Black Hawks	12–7–6	30
26	December 8	Chicago Black Hawks	1–1	Toronto Maple Leafs	12–7–7	31
27	December 9	Montreal Canadiens	1–2	Chicago Black Hawks	13–7–7	33
28	December 12	New York Rangers	3–4	Chicago Black Hawks	14–7–7	35
29	December 15	Chicago Black Hawks	1–3	Detroit Red Wings	14–8–7	35
30	December 16	Toronto Maple Leafs	6–2	Chicago Black Hawks	14–9–7	35
31	December 19	Boston Bruins	2–3	Chicago Black Hawks	15–9–7	37
32	December 22	Chicago Black Hawks	1–1	Montreal Canadiens	15–9–8	38
33	December 23	Chicago Black Hawks	3–1	New York Rangers	16–9–8	40
34	December 25	Montreal Canadiens	6–0	Chicago Black Hawks	16–10–8	40
35	December 29	Chicago Black Hawks	1–1	Toronto Maple Leafs	16–10–9	41
36	December 30	Boston Bruins	2–4	Chicago Black Hawks	17–10–9	43

January

Game	Date	Visitor	Score	Home	Record	Points
37	January 1	Detroit Red Wings	2–4	Chicago Black Hawks	18–10–9	45
38	January 6	Toronto Maple Leafs	5–1	Chicago Black Hawks	18–11–9	45
39	January 9	Chicago Black Hawks	3–1	Toronto Maple Leafs	19–11–9	47
40	January 10	Chicago Black Hawks	4–5	Boston Bruins	19–12–9	47
41	January 12	New York Rangers	1–3	Chicago Black Hawks	20–12–9	49
42	January 13	Montreal Canadiens	2–2	Chicago Black Hawks	20–12–10	50
43	January 16	Boston Bruins	5–4	Chicago Black Hawks	20–13–10	50
44	January 19	Chicago Black Hawks	4–1	Toronto Maple Leafs	21–13–10	52
45	January 20	New York Rangers	2–6	Chicago Black Hawks	22–13–10	54
46	January 23	Chicago Black Hawks	3–3	New York Rangers	22–13–11	55
47	January 26	Chicago Black Hawks	3–0	Detroit Red Wings	23–13–11	57
48	January 27	Montreal Canadiens	3–1	Chicago Black Hawks	23–14–11	57
49	January 31	Chicago Black Hawks	9–2	Boston Bruins	24–14–11	59

February

Game	Date	Visitor	Score	Home	Record	Points
50	February 2	Chicago Black Hawks	3–3	Montreal Canadiens	24–14–12	60
51	February 3	Toronto Maple Leafs	1–3	Chicago Black Hawks	25–14–12	62
52	February 6	Detroit Red Wings	3–3	Chicago Black Hawks	25–14–13	63
53	February 9	Chicago Black Hawks	3–3	New York Rangers	25–14–14	64
54	February 10	New York Rangers	2–4	Chicago Black Hawks	26–14–14	66
55	February 16	Chicago Black Hawks	2–4	Montreal Canadiens	26–15–14	66
56	February 17	Boston Bruins	1–3	Chicago Black Hawks	27–15–14	68
57	February 21	Chicago Black Hawks	5–3	Detroit Red Wings	28–15–14	70
58	February 23	Detroit Red Wings	2–3	Chicago Black Hawks	29–15–14	72
59	February 24	Boston Bruins	3–4	Chicago Black Hawks	30–15–14	74
60	February 27	Chicago Black Hawks	3–6	Toronto Maple Leafs	30–16–14	74
61	February 28	New York Rangers	6–1	Chicago Black Hawks	30–17–14	74

March

Game	Date	Visitor	Score	Home	Record	Points
62	March 3	Montreal Canadiens	2–2	Chicago Black Hawks	30–17–15	75
63	March 6	Chicago Black Hawks	2–5	New York Rangers	30–18–15	75
64	March 10	Toronto Maple Leafs	1–1	Chicago Black Hawks	30–18–16	76
65	March 14	Chicago Black Hawks	2–0	Boston Bruins	31–18–16	78
66	March 16	Chicago Black Hawks	0–3	Toronto Maple Leafs	31–19–16	78
67	March 17	Chicago Black Hawks	2–4	Detroit Red Wings	31–20–16	78
68	March 19	Detroit Red Wings	5–1	Chicago Black Hawks	31–21–16	78
69	March 23	Chicago Black Hawks	4–4	Montreal Canadiens	31–21–17	79
70	March 24	Chicago Black Hawks	4–3	Boston Bruins	32–21–17	81

Legend: Win (2 points) Loss (0 points) Tie (1 point)

=== Playoffs ===
1963 Stanley Cup playoffs
Semifinals vs. (4) Detroit Red Wings – Red Wings win 4–2

Game	Date	Visitor	Score	Home	Series
1	March 26	Detroit Red Wings	4–5	Chicago Black Hawks	1–0
2	March 28	Detroit Red Wings	2–5	Chicago Black Hawks	2–0
3	March 31	Chicago Black Hawks	2–4	Detroit Red Wings	2–1
4	April 2	Chicago Black Hawks	1–4	Detroit Red Wings	2–2
5	April 4	Detroit Red Wings	4–2	Chicago Black Hawks	2–3
6	April 7	Chicago Black Hawks	4–7	Detroit Red Wings	2–4

Legend: Win Loss

== Season stats ==
=== Scoring leaders ===
Player	GP	G	A	Pts	PIM
Stan Mikita	65	31	45	76	69
Bobby Hull	65	31	31	62	27
Ab McDonald	69	20	41	61	12
Bill Hay	64	12	33	45	36
Kenny Wharram	55	20	18	38	17

=== Goaltending ===
Player	GP	TOI	W	L	T	GA	SO	GAA
Glenn Hall	66	3910	30	20	15	161	5	2.47
Denis DeJordy	5	290	2	1	2	12	0	2.48

== Playoff stats ==
=== Scoring leaders ===
Player	GP	G	A	Pts	PIM
Bobby Hull	5	8	2	10	4
Pierre Pilote	6	0	8	8	8
Kenny Wharram	6	1	5	6	0
Bill Hay	6	3	2	5	6
Stan Mikita	6	3	2	5	2

=== Goaltending ===
Player	GP	TOI	W	L	GA	SO	GAA
Glenn Hall	6	360	2	4	25	0	4.17

== Sources ==
- Hockey-Reference
- Rauzulu's Street
- Goalies Archive
- National Hockey League Guide & Record Book 2007
