= Ron Oakes =

Canadian-American sportscaster

Ronald W. Oakes
- Born: 23 November 1933; Winnipeg, Canada
- Died: 29 May 2007 (aged 73); San Diego, California, United States
- Occupation: Sportscaster
- Known for: Play-by-play announcer for Winnipeg Blue Bombers, San Diego Gulls (1966–1974), Chicago Blackhawks, Los Angeles Kings

Ronald W. Oakes (November 23, 1933 – May 29, 2007) was a Canadian-American sportscaster who called was the play-by-play announcer for several hockey teams as well as the Winnipeg Blue Bombers of the Canadian Football League.

== Biography ==
Oakes was born on November 23, 1933, in Winnipeg. He got his start in broadcasting in 1955 at CKRC, where he called games for the Winnipeg Blue Bombers and the Winnipeg Warriors. From 1964 to 1966, he worked for CBR in Calgary. He then spent six seasons as the play-by-play announcer for the San Diego Gulls of the Western Hockey League. In 1973, he became the radio announcer for the Vancouver Blazers of the World Hockey Association. When the team moved east and became the Calgary Cowboys, Oakes was given the job of publicity director, but announcing duties were given to local broadcaster Eric Bishop. In 1976, Oakes called 23 Los Angeles Kings games on HBO. From 1977 to 1978, Oakes was the radio and television announcer for the Chicago Blackhawks. He then returned to San Diego, where he the press relations director and announcer for the San Diego Hawks of the Pacific Hockey League.

In 1983, Oakes returned to Winnipeg as the play-by-play announcer for Winnipeg Blue Bombers games on CFRW. He retired from broadcasting after the season and returned to San Diego, where he ran a travel business. He came out of retirement in 1990 to become the play-by-play announcer for the new San Diego Gulls of the International Hockey League.

In 2001, Oakes was diagnosed with progressive supranuclear palsy. He died on May 29, 2007, at his home in San Diego.
