= Brian Davis (sportscaster) =

Basketball television announcer

Brian Davis is an American former television play-by-play announcer, most recently of the Oklahoma City Thunder, an NBA franchise based in Oklahoma City, Oklahoma.

== Sportscasting biography ==
In 2004, he was host of Seattle SuperSonics telecasts, called occasional Sonics games, and also worked for NBA Radio as a sideline reporter and studio host. Davis also was a member of the Chicago Bulls broadcasts as a television studio host and has called play-by-play for college football and basketball for the Big Ten Conference, Pacific-10 Conference, Conference USA, and the Mid-American Conference. On the professional side other than NBA basketball, Davis was the radio voice of the Seattle Seahawks, college football for CBS Radio/Westwood One, the Chicago Blackhawks, Chicago Fire S.C., and preseason games for the Arizona Cardinals. He was a sports anchor for CBS Radio and all Chicago-news affiliates. Davis has covered the Olympics, Stanley Cup Finals, the NBA Finals, DePaul Blue Demons men's basketball, and hosted radio broadcasts for the Chicago Blackhawks and Bears.

== Personal ==
Davis graduated from Northwestern University with a degree in journalism. He resides in Oklahoma City with his spouse, Judy. Brian has won numerous awards in his career.

== Controversies ==
During a basketball game on April 11, 2018, Davis described Thunder point guard Russell Westbrook as playing "out of his cotton-picking mind" after an assist against the Memphis Grizzlies. Due to offensive racial connotations of this phrase, Davis apologized for the remark. The Thunder announced that Davis would be suspended for game one of the Thunder's first-round Western Conference playoff series against the Utah Jazz. After the season the Thunder declined to renew the contract of the only television play-by-play announcer the team has had since it relocated in 2008. A team statement did not give a reason for the decision.
