= Sleep On It (TV series) =

- Genre: Reality
- Country of origin: United States
- Original language: English

Production
- Running time: 24 minutes

Original release
- Network: HGTV (USA)
- Release: January 1, 2008

Sleep On It is a half-hour show that premiered on HGTV on January 1, 2008 at 10 pm (eastern). The show will feature families looking to buy a house who get to "try" the house before they make a final decision.

In each episode, the potential buyers will first look at two possible homes. From those two, they will choose one to give a trial run, by living and sleeping in the house for 24 hours, before deciding if they want to buy it.

The show is narrated by Brian Davis.

== See also ==
To Buy or Not to Buy (a similar program in Britain)
