= Pat Foley =

American ice hockey commentator (born 1954)

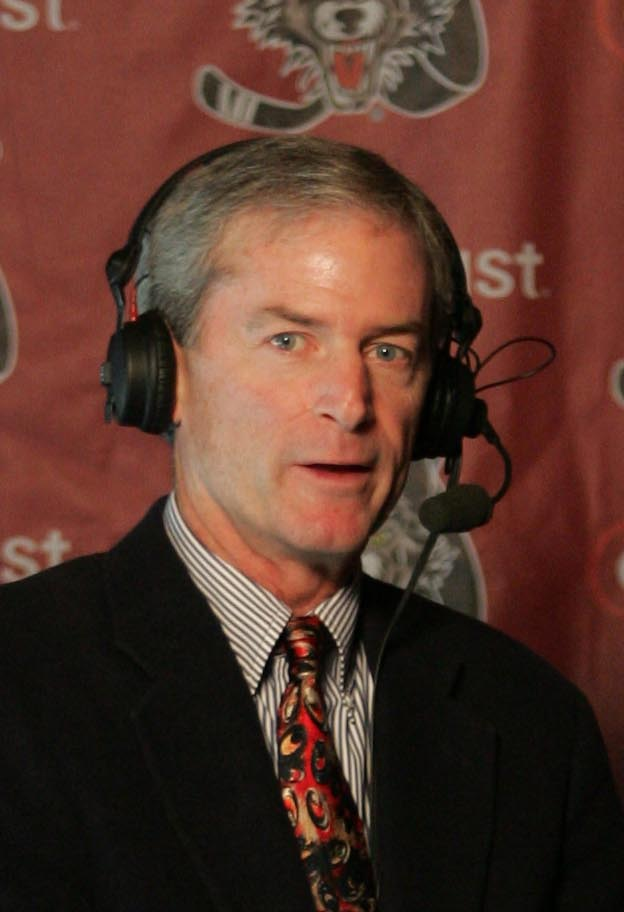
- Foley in October 2006
- Born: 1954 (age 71–72); Glenview, Illinois, US
- Education: BS, Michigan State
- Occupation: Play-by-play commentator
- Years active: 1977–2022
- Employers: Chicago Blackhawks; Chicago Wolves

Pat Foley (born 1954) is an American retired play-by-play commentator for ice hockey.

== Personal life ==
Born in Glenview, Illinois in 1954, Pat Foley is the son of Mary and Bob Foley. He is an alumnus of Loyola Academy and Michigan State University, with a Bachelor of Science in telecommunications from the latter.

== Career ==
In 1964, Foley was allowed into the radio booth at Wrigley Field and sat alongside announcers Lou Boudreau and Jack Quinlan. This sparked his interest in play-by-play commentating. After calling baseball and hockey games at Michigan State University, in 1977 he began his career in Grand Rapids, Michigan announcing minor league hockey games. His father would take the recordings of Foley at Grand Rapids Owls' games and pass them along to Michael Wirtz, brother of Bill Wirtz, owner of the Chicago Blackhawks. This secured Foley a position at the company, and his first game was the night Stan Mikita's number was retired in 1981.

Foley worked for the Blackhawks as a play-by-play commentator from 1981 to 2006. He was fired "amid a rift with [Blackhawks] management" in 2006. Foley spent the 2006–07 and 2007–08 AHL seasons calling games for the Chicago Wolves. He returned to the Blackhawks in 2008 following the death of Bill Wirtz, and partnered with Eddie Olczyk. On June 23, 2021, the Blackhawks announced via Twitter that the 2021–22 NHL season would be Foley's final season calling games. Foley explained his decision to retire, commenting, "I just don't have 82 in me anymore. That's a lot of games, and 82 is not for me. Will I never step behind a microphone again? Not saying that. But not full-time." He called his final official game on April 14, 2022, after 39 years with the Blackhawks.

Invited by Nick Olczyk, the retired Foley joined him and Billy Jaffe in calling the 2023 NHL Winter Classic at Fenway Park on January 2, 2023. He and Bernie Federko were expected to call the 2025 NHL Winter Classic at Wrigley Field on December 31, 2024, for the Sports USA Radio Network.

=== Legacy ===
Foley became renowned for his exclamation during the Blackhawks' game against the Minnesota North Stars for the 1985 Stanley Cup playoffs. When Murray Bannerman "made a dramatic save on a breakaway, Foley cried out, 'BANNERRRMANNN!'" By 2014, Foley was still constantly asked to repeat the iconic outburst. John McDonough described Foley as "synonymous with Blackhawks hockey [with a voice that] resonates loudly to our entire fan base."

Foley won Emmy Awards in 1991, 2009, 2012, 2014, and 2015. He was inducted into the Chicagoland Sports Hall of Fame in 2002. On April 19, 2013, NBC Sports Chicago honored Foley for his 30th season with the Blackhawks. In 2014, he received the Foster Hewitt Memorial Award and entered the Hockey Hall of Fame. In 2019, the National Sports Media Association named Foley the Illinois Sportscaster of the Year.
