= 1963 in Michigan =

- Decades: 1940s; 1950s; 1960s; 1970s; 1980s
- See also: History of Michigan; Historical outline of Michigan; List of years in Michigan; 1963 in the United States

Events from the year 1963 in Michigan.

The Detroit Free Press and the Associated Press each selected the top 10 news stories in Michigan. The top stories included the following:

1. The voters' adoption of a new Michigan Constitution (AP-1, DFP-1);
2. Gov. George W. Romney's fiscal reform campaign, including a proposed state income tax that was defeated by the Legislature (AP-2, DFP-4);
3. A boom year for the automobile industry (AP-6, DFP-2);
4. Racial demonstrations, including the June 23 Detroit Walk to Freedom that drew an estimated crowd of 125,000 and was known as "the largest civil rights demonstration in the nation's history" up to that date (AP-7, DFP-3);
5. A botulism outbreak that (i) killed two Grosse Ile women in March tied to canned tuna, (ii) resulted in two additional deaths in October tied to smoked whitefish, and (iii) caused five deaths in the south traced to Michigan-packaged smoked chubs; some of the botulism was traced to smoked fish canned in Grand Haven (AP-4, DFP-7);
6. The ouster of Joe Collins led by former Gov. John Swainson and selection of Zolton Ferency as chairman of the state Democratic Party at the February convention in Grand Rapids (AP-9, DFP-6);
7. Detroit's bid to host the 1968 Summer Olympics, ending with the International Olympic Committee's selection of Mexico City on October 18 (AP-8, DFP-8);
8. The April escape of four prisoners from the Michigan State Prison in Jackson leading to an intensive manhunt (AP-11 [tie], DFP-9);
9. The disappearance and murder of Joan Watkins, a 28-year-old housewife and mother from Brooklyn, Michigan (AP-11 [tie], DFP-10);
10. The impact on Michigan of the assassination of President John F. Kennedy (AP-3);
11. Gov. George W. Romney's first year in office (AP-5);
12. An April election in which Detroit voters rejected school millage and building bonds (a schools only proposal passed in November) (DFP-5); and
13. The suspension of Alex Karras by the Detroit Lions as a result of a betting scandal (AP-10).

The United Press International (UPI) selected the state's top sports stories as follows:

1. The suspension of Alex Karras by the Detroit Lions;
2. The June 18 firing of Bob Scheffing as manager of the Detroit Tigers;
3. Detroit's loss of its bid to host the 1968 Summer Olympics;
4. Gordie Howe's 545th regular season goal on November 10, breaking the NHL record set by Maurice Richard;
5. The 1963 Michigan State Spartans football team's unsuccessful bid to play in the 1964 Rose Bowl, losing to Illinois in the final game of the season;
6. William Clay Ford Sr.'s November 22 purchase of a controlling interest in the Detroit Lions;
7. The November 18 trade of Rocky Colavito by the Detroit Tigers to the Kansas City Athletics;
8. The collapse of the 1962 Detroit Lions season after numerous injuries;
9. The July 27 collapse of a bridge into the Clinton River, causing injury to 48 persons, during a golf tournament at Hillcrest Country Club in Macomb County; and
10. The 1962–63 Detroit Red Wings playing in the 1963 Stanley Cup Finals.

== Office holders ==
=== State office holders ===
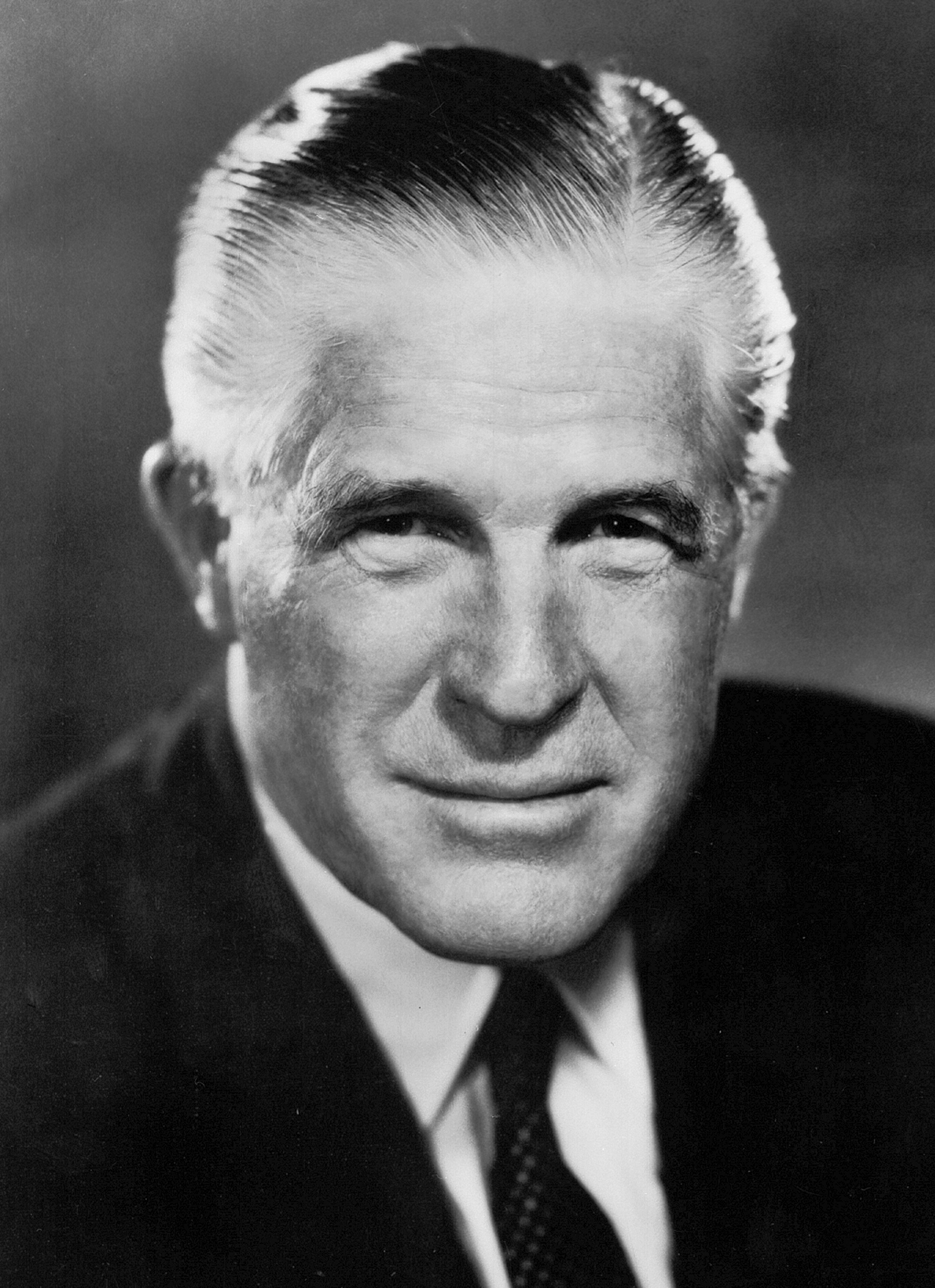
Gov. Romney

- Governor of Michigan: George W. Romney (Republican)
- Lieutenant Governor of Michigan: T. John Lesinski (Democrat)
- Michigan Attorney General: Frank J. Kelley (Democrat)
- Michigan Secretary of State: James M. Hare (Democrat)
- Speaker of the Michigan House of Representatives: Allison Green (Republican)
- Majority Leader of the Michigan Senate: Stanley G. Thayer (Republican)
- Chief Justice, Michigan Supreme Court: Leland W. Carr

=== Mayors of major cities ===
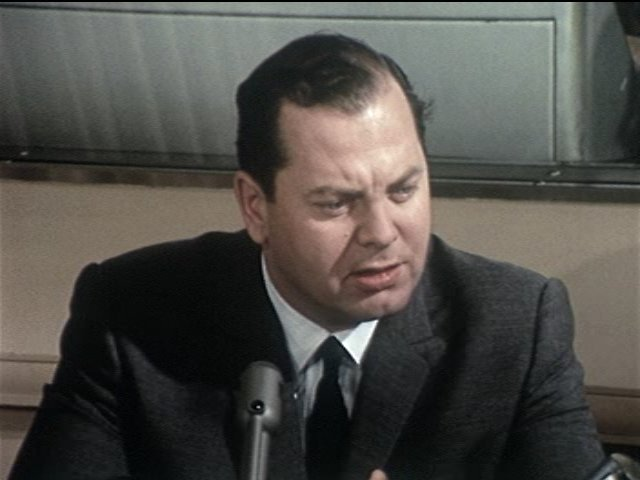
Mayor Cavanagh

- Mayor of Detroit: Jerome Cavanagh
- Mayor of Grand Rapids: Stanley J. Davis
- Mayor of Flint: George R. Poulos
- Mayor of Saginaw: G. Stewart Francke
- Mayor of Warren, Michigan: Ted Bates
- Mayor of Dearborn: Orville L. Hubbard
- Mayor of Lansing: Willard I. Bowerman, Jr. (Republican)
- Mayor of Ann Arbor: Cecil Creal (Republican)

=== Federal office holders ===
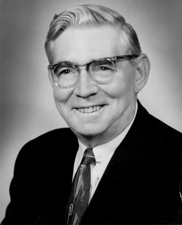
Sen. McNamara

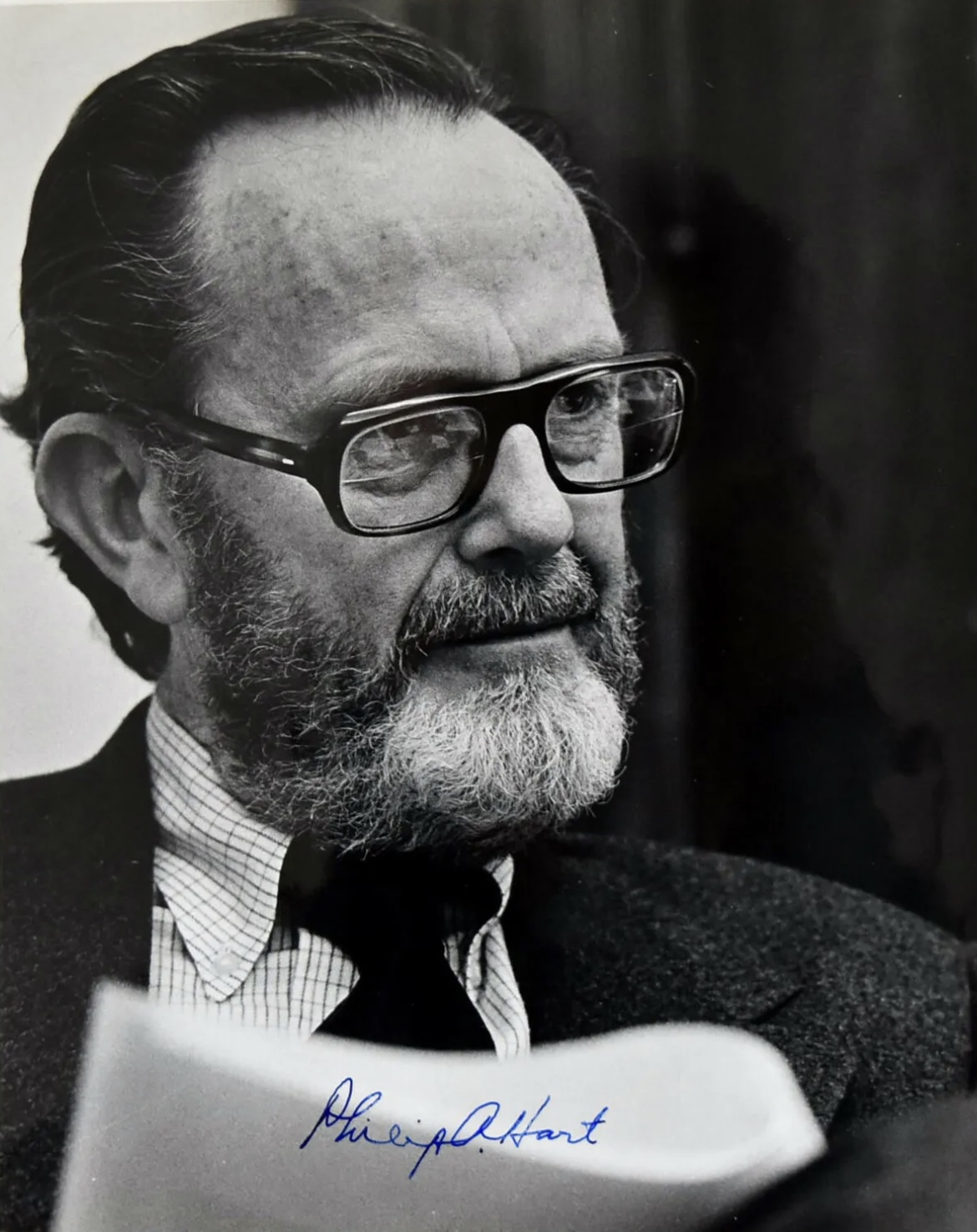
Sen. Hart

- U.S. Senator from Michigan: Patrick V. McNamara (Democrat)
- U.S. Senator from Michigan: Philip Hart (Democrat)
- House District 1: Lucien N. Nedzi (Democrat)
- House District 2: George Meader (Republican)
- House District 3: August E. Johansen (Republican)
- House District 4: J. Edward Hutchinson (Republican)
- House District 5: Gerald Ford (Republican)
- House District 6: Charles E. Chamberlain (Republican)
- House District 7: James G. O'Hara (Democrat)
- House District 8: R. James Harvey (Republican)
- House District 9: Robert P. Griffin (Republican)
- House District 10: Elford Albin Cederberg (Republican)
- House District 11: Victor A. Knox (Republican)
- House District 12: John B. Bennett (Republican)
- House District 13: Charles Diggs (Democrat)
- House District 14: Harold M. Ryan (Democrat)
- House District 15: John Dingell (Democrat)
- House District 16: John Lesinski Jr. (Democrat)
- House District 17: Martha Griffiths (Democrat)
- House District 18: William Broomfield (Republican)
- House At Large: Neil Staebler (Democrat)

== Population ==
In the 1960 United States census, Michigan was recorded as having a population of 7,823,194 persons, ranking as the seventh most populous state in the country. By 1970, the state's population had grown 13.4% to 8,875,083 persons.

=== Cities ===
The following is a list of cities in Michigan with a population of at least 60,000 based on 1960 U.S. Census data. Historic census data from 1950 and 1970 is included to reflect trends in population increases or decreases. Cities that are part of the Detroit metropolitan area are shaded in tan.

1960 Rank	City	County	1950 Pop.	1960 Pop.	1970 Pop.	Change 1960-70
1	Detroit	Wayne	1,849,568	1,670,144	1,514,063	−9.3% ▼
2	Flint	Genesee	163,143	196,940	193,317	−1.8% ▼
3	Grand Rapids	Kent	176,515	177,313	197,649	11.5% ▲
4	Dearborn	Wayne	94,994	112,007	104,199	−7.0% ▼
5	Lansing	Ingham	92,129	107,807	131,403	21.9% ▲
6	Saginaw	Saginaw	92,918	98,265	91,849	−6.5% ▼
7	Warren	Macomb	42,653	89,246	179,260	100.2% ▲
8	Pontiac	Oakland	73,681	82,233	85,279	3.7% ▲
9	Kalamazoo	Kalamazoo	57,704	82,089	85,555	4.1% ▲
10	Royal Oak	Oakland	46,898	80,612	86,238	7.0% ▲
11	St. Clair Shores	Macomb	19,823	76,657	88,093	14.9% ▲
12	Ann Arbor	Washtenaw	48,251	67,340	100,035	48.6% ▲
13	Livonia	Wayne	17,634	66,702	110,109	65.1% ▲
14	Dearborn Heights	Wayne	20,235	61,118	80,069	31.0% ▲
15	Westland	Wayne	30,407	60,743	86,749	42.8% ▲

=== Counties ===
The following is a list of counties in Michigan with populations of at least 100,000 based on 1960 U.S. Census data. Historic census data from 1950 and 1970 are included to reflect trends in population increases or decreases. Counties that are part of the Detroit metropolitan area are shaded in tan.

1960 Rank	County	Largest city	1950 Pop.	1960 Pop.	1970 Pop.	Change 1960-70
1	Wayne	Detroit	2,435,235	2,666,297	2,666,751	0.0% ▲
2	Oakland	Pontiac	396,001	690,259	907,871	31.5% ▲
3	Macomb	Warren	184,961	405,804	625,309	54.1% ▲
4	Genesee	Flint	270,963	374,313	444,341	18.7% ▲
5	Kent	Grand Rapids	288,292	363,187	411,044	13.2% ▲
6	Ingham	Lansing	172,941	211,296	261,039	23.5% ▲
7	Saginaw	Saginaw	153,515	190,752	219,743	15.2% ▲
8	Washtenaw	Ann Arbor	134,606	172,440	234,103	35.8% ▲
9	Kalamazoo	Kalamazoo	126,707	169,712	201,550	18.8% ▲
10	Berrien	Benton Harbor	115,702	149,865	163,875	9.3% ▲
11	Calhoun	Battle Creek	120,813	138,858	141,963	2.2% ▲
12	Jackson	Jackson	108,168	131,994	143,274	8.5% ▲
13	Muskegon	Muskegon	121,545	129,943	157,426	21.2% ▲
14	St. Clair	Port Huron	91,599	107,201	120,175	12.1% ▲
15	Bay	Bay City	88,461	107,042	117,339	9.6% ▲
16	Monroe	Monroe	75,666	101,120	118,479	17.2% ▲

== Sports ==
=== Baseball ===
- 1963 Detroit Tigers season – Under managers Bob Scheffing and Charlie Dressen, the Tigers compiled a 79–83 record and finished in fifth place in the American League. The team's statistical leaders included Al Kaline with a .312 batting average, 27 home runs, and 101 RBIs, Phil Regan with 15 wins, and Frank Lary with a 3.27 earned run average.
- 1963 Michigan Wolverines baseball team - Under head coach Moby Benedict, the Wolverines compiled a 21–11 record. Joe Jones was the team captain.

=== American football ===
- 1963 Detroit Lions season – The Lions, under head coach George Wilson, compiled a 5–8–1 record and finished in fourth place in the NFL's West Division. The team's statistical leaders included Earl Morrall with 2,621 passing yards, Dan Lewis with 528 rushing yards, and Terry Barr with 1,086 receiving yards and 78 points scored.
- 1963 Michigan State Spartans football team – Under head coach Duffy Daugherty, the Spartans compiled a 6–2–1 record and were ranked No. 9 in the final AP Poll. The team's statistical leaders included Steve Juday with 509 passing yards, Roger Lopew with 601 rushing yards, and Sherman Lewis with 303 receiving yards and 54 points scored.
- 1963 Michigan Wolverines football team – Under head coach Bump Elliott, the Wolverines compiled a 3–4–2 record. The team's statistical leaders included Bob Timberlake with 593 passing yards, Mel Anthony with 394 rushing yards and 30 points scored, and John Henderson with 330 receiving yards.

=== Basketball ===
- 1962–63 Detroit Pistons season – Under head coach Dick McGuire, the Pistons compiled a 34–46 record. The team's statistical leaders included Bailey Howell with 1,793 points and 910 rebounds and Don Ohl with 325 assists.
- 1962–63 Michigan Wolverines men's basketball team – Under head coach Dave Strack, the Wolverines compiled a 16–8 record. Bill Buntin led the team with 534 points and 376 rebounds.
- 1962–63 Michigan State Spartans men's basketball team – Under head coach Forddy Anderson, the Spartans compiled a 4–16 record. Pete Gent led the team with 329 points scored, and Bill Berry led in rebounds with 184.
- 1962–63 Detroit Titans men's basketball team – The Titans compiled a 14–12 record under head coach Bob Calihan. Dick Dzik led the team with 424 points scored and 385 rebounds.
- 1962–63 Western Michigan Broncos men's basketball team – Under head coach Don Boven, the Broncos compiled a 12–12 record.

=== Ice hockey ===
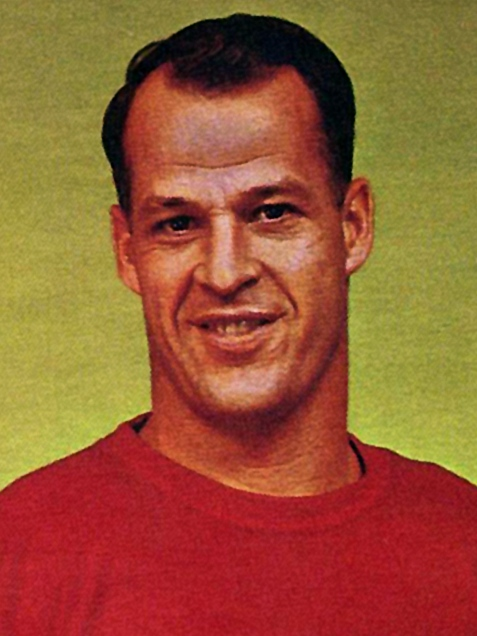
Gordie Howe

- 1962–63 Detroit Red Wings season – Under head coach Sid Abel, the Red Wings compiled a 32–25–13 record, finished fourth in the NHL, and lost to the Toronto Maple Leafs in five games in the 1963 Stanley Cup Finals. Gordie Howe led the team with 38 goals, 48 assists, and 86 points. The team's regular goaltender was Terry Sawchuk, and Hank Bassen was the backup.
- 1962–63 Michigan Tech Huskies men's ice hockey team – Under head coach John MacInnes, Michigan Tech compiled a 17–10–2 record.
- 1962–63 Michigan Wolverines men's ice hockey season – Under head coach Al Renfrew, the Wolverines compiled a 7–14–3 record.
- 1962–63 Michigan State Spartans men's ice hockey team – Under head coach Amo Bessone, the Spartans compiled an 11–12 record.

=== Golf ===
- Buick Open – Julius Boros won the 1963 Buick Open; Dow Finsterwald was the runner up
- Michigan Open – Phil Wiechman won the 1963 Michigan Open

=== Boat racing ===
- Port Huron to Mackinac Boat Race –
- APBA Gold Cup - On July 8, racing in the Miss Bardahl, Ron Musson won the APBA Gold Cup on the Detroit River

== Music ==
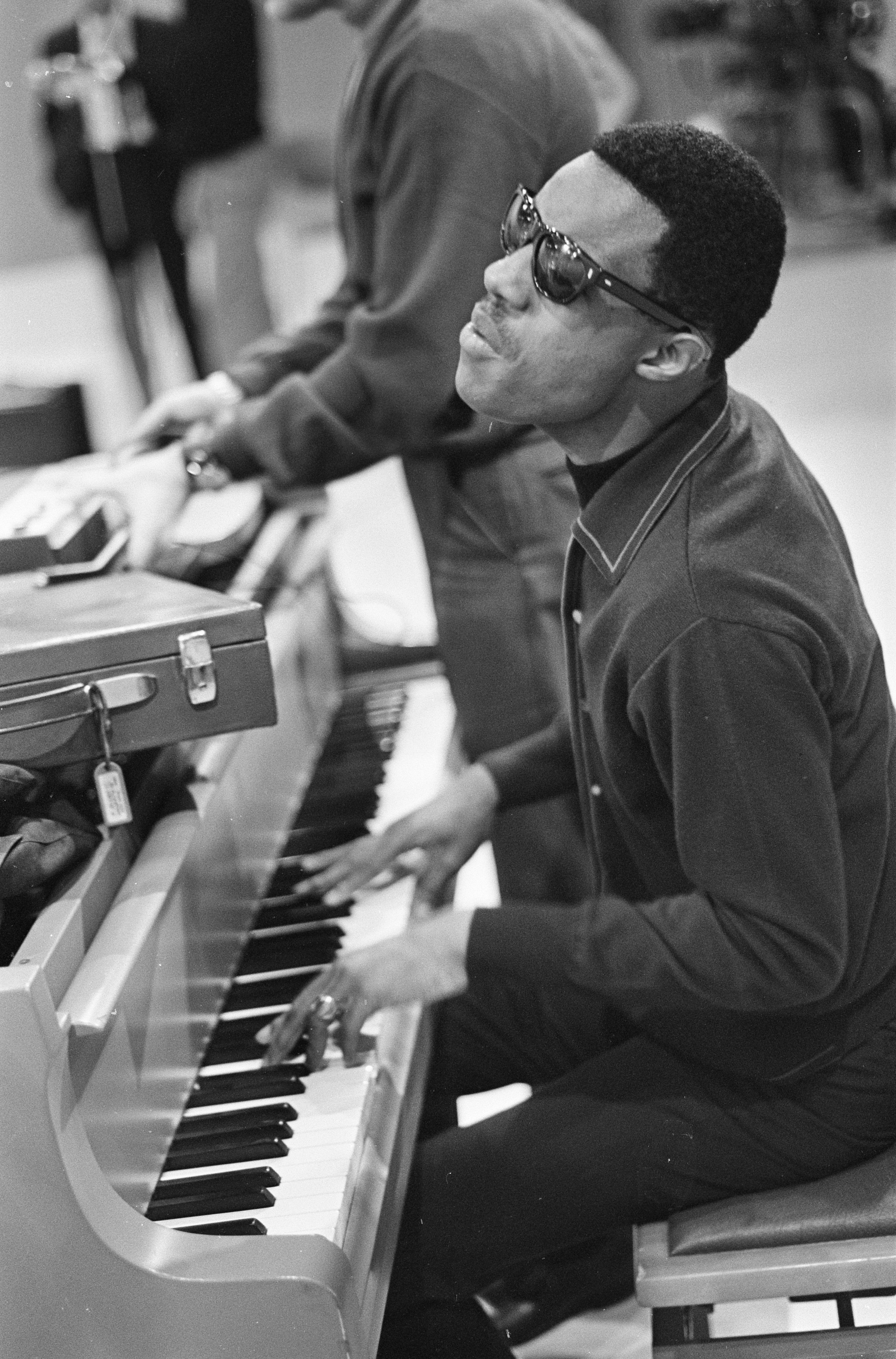
Little Stevie Wonder

Detroit's Motown record label had several hits in 1963, including the following:

- "Pride and Joy" by Marvin Gaye was released on September 12, 1962, became a hit in 1963 reaching No. 2 on the R&B chart and No. 10 on the Billboard Hot 100, and was ranked No. 72 on the Billboard Year-End Hot 100 singles of 1963;
- "You've Really Got a Hold on Me" by The Miracles was released on November 9, 1962, became a hit in 1963 reaching No. 1 on the R&B chart and No. 8 on the Billboard Hot 100, and was ranked No. 65 on the Billboard Year-End Hot 100 singles of 1963;
- "Come and Get These Memories" by Martha and the Vandellas was released on February 22, 1963, reached No. 6 on the R&B chart and No. 29 on the Billboard Hot 100, and was ranked No. 94 on the Billboard Year-End Hot 100 singles of 1963;
- "Fingertips" by Little Stevie Wonder was released on May 21, reached No. 1 on the Billboard Hot 100, and ranked No. 8 on the Billboard Year-End Hot 100 singles of 1963;
- "Heat Wave" by Martha & the Vandellas was released on July 9, ranked No. 1 on the R&B chart and No. 4 on the Billboard Hot 100, and ranked No. 32 on the Billboard Year-End Hot 100 singles of 1963;
- "Mickey's Monkey" by The Miracles was released on July 26, reached No. 3 on the R&B chart and No. 8 on the Billboard Hot 100, and ranked No. 85 on the Billboard Year-End Hot 100 singles of 1963;
- "Can I Get a Witness" by Marvin Gaye was released on September 20 and reached No. 22 on the Billboard Hot 100; and
- "Quicksand" by Martha and the Vandellas was released on November 4 and reached No. 8 on the Billboard Hot 100.

== Chronology of events ==
=== January ===
- January 1 - George Romney was sworn in as Governor of Michigan before a crowd of 3,000 persons in Lansing.
- January 1 - Demolition began on the site of the Pontchartrain Hotel, the first major hotel built in Detroit in more than 30 years.
- January 3 - Sixten Ehrling was named permanent conductor of the Detroit Symphony Orchestra
- January 7 - Henry Ford II announced a $400 million expansion plan for Ford Motor Company, including $50-60 million in the Detroit area
- January 8 - Detroit Police Commissioner George Edwards charged that several Detroit Lions players, including Alex Karras and Wayne Walker, were associating with "notorious gamblers"
- January 12 - Three persons were killed when a plane crashed into the back yard of a home in Warren, Michigan
- January 23-24 - Cold weather covers much of the country with over 100 deaths; Detroit records a record 12 degrees below zero
- January 28 - General Motors announced a 1962 profit of $1.459 billion, the largest corporate profit in history

=== February ===
- February 5 - Following a month of sniper shootings in Oakland County, a 15-year-old genius (140 IQ) from Bloomfield Township, Douglas Cooper Godfrey, was arrested. He confessed to shooting and killing his mother. A 22-year-old Novi man confessed on February 7 to another shooting which was intended to copy the Bloomfield shooter.
- February 6 - Ford Motor Company announced record 1962 profits of $480.7 million.
- February 15 - Studebaker announced it would install seatbelts on all new cars, becoming the first auto maker to make the commitment.
- February 18 - General Motors announced a $1.25 billion expansion plan, including $500 million in investments in Michigan
- February 24 - The executive offices of Hygrade Food Products in Detroit were destroyed by a fire.

=== March ===
- March 4 - Detroit Tigers holdout Rocky Colavito signed a $54,000 contract with the club.
- March 18 - Detroit announces as the winner of the USOC bid to host the 1968 Summer Olympics.

=== April ===
- April 7 - Three Central Michigan University students were killed and 12 injured as a wall collapsed in a burning building in Mount Pleasant.
- April 9 - Arjay Miller was announced as the new president of Ford Motor Company.
- April 12 - Two white men were arrested in Mississippi for throwing a firebomb into a house where Detroit Congressman Charles Diggs was staying.
- April 16 - Chrysler announced a $36.2 million profit in first quarter with a 50% increase in sales.
- April 17 - NFL Commissioner Pete Rozelle suspended Lions' star Alex Karras for one year for betting on football games. Five other Lions were fined $2,000 each for betting on the 1962 NFL Championship Game.
- April 18 - The Detroit Red Wings lost the final game of the 1963 Stanley Cup Finals to the Toronto Maple Leafs.
- April 23 - Four prisoners escaped from Jackson Prison. The last three prisoners were captured on May 25 in Wisconsin.
- April 24 - General Motors announced record profits of $414 million in first quarter on sales of $4.1 billion.

=== May ===
- May 9 - Jimmy Hoffa was indicted on charges of tampering with a federal grand jury in Nashville.

=== June ===
- June - Charles S. Mott gifted General Motors stock valued at $129 million to the Flint schools and other local programs.
- June 4 - Jimmy Hoffa was indicted in Chicago on federal charges of fraudulently obtaining loans from Teamsters pension funds.
- June 9 - A tornado injured 12 persons in Belmont, Michigan (north of Grand Rapids), with storms and flooding extending to Detroit
- June 18 - Bob Scheffing was fired as manager of the Detroit Tigers
- June 20 - Anthony Giacalone was arrested for bribing a police officer to lay off his gambling operation.
- June 23 - Martin Luther King Jr. spoke to 125,000 at the Detroit Walk to Freedom in downtown Detroit. At the time, it was the largest civil rights demonstration in US history.
- June 27 - The first public hearing is held on the new I-696 freeway which is expected to require demolition of 1,500 homes and businesses.

=== July ===
- July 24 - The body of Detroit confidence man Sol C. Brodsky was discovered riddled with bullets in Macomb Township.
- July 27 - A bridge collapsed into the Clinton River, causing injury to 48 persons, during a golf tournament at Hillcrest Country Club in Macomb County.
- July 29 - General Motors announced second quarter earnings that broke 10 records. Earnings for the first six months totaled $878 million on $8.668 billion in sales. Worldwide employment reached 641,449.

=== August ===
- August 21 - General Motors and Chrysler announce that seat belts will be standard equipment starting in 1964.

=== September ===
- September 19 - 40 persons arrested in Detroit drug raid; heroin and marijuana seized.
- September 26 - An elephant escaped from a carnival, broke through the windows of a Lansing department store, and rampaged through the store.
- September 29 - The Detroit Free Press publishes an investigative report on the runway at Selfridge Air Force Base built with defective concrete that has developed thousands of small holes, forcing the Air Force to declare it hazardous.

=== October ===
- October 3-8 - Four die in botulism outbreak tied to smoked whitefish packaged in Michigan
- October 5 - Unemployment rate in Michigan and Detroit area drops to 3.9%, the lowest level since 1955.
- October 10 - Detroit Police Commissioner testified before Congress about the operations of the Mafia in Detroit.
- October 11 - Michigan State Police raided the Star Social Club in Madison Heights, alleged to be a gambling operation tied to the Mafia.
- October 18 - The International Olympic Committee awarded the 1968 Summer Olympics to Mexico City. The vote count was 30 votes for Mexico City, 14 for Detroit, 12 for Lyons, and two for Buenos Aires.
- October 25 - A five-year-old girl was kidnapped from a car in Lansing. She was found alive one day later.
- October 28 - General Motors announced record profits of $1.086 billion for first three quarters on sales of $11.681 billion.

=== November ===
- November 6 - Detroit's Archbishop John Dearden was appointed to the Vatican Secretariat for Promoting Christian Unity.
- November 9 - After a 10-year decline in Detroit's population from 1.905 million in 1953 to 1.620 million in 1963, Detroit Metropolitan Area Regional Planning Commission projected an increase in population moving forward.
- November 10 - Gordie Howe scored his 545th regular season goal against the Montreal Canadiens, breaking the NHL record set by Maurice Richard.
- November 18 - The Detroit Tigers traded Rocky Colavito to the Kansas City Athletics.
- November 20 - A federal judge in Nashville charged that Jimmy Hoffa's attorney conspired to bribe a juror in Hoffa's trial for tampering with a grand jury.
- November 22

- William Clay Ford Sr. purchased a controlling interest in the Detroit Lions.
- Pres. John F. Kennedy was assassinated in Dallas.

=== December ===
- December 2 - Chrysler plans disclosed for a stamping plant in Sterling Heights providing 3,000 jobs.
- December 9 - Studebaker announced it would cease manufacturing automobiles in the United States.

== Births ==
- March 18 - Mario Impemba, sportscaster and TV voice of the Detroit Tigers (2002–present), in Detroit
- March 19 - Neil LaBute, film director and screenwriter (Possession, The Shape of Things, The Wicker Man, Some Velvet Morning, Dirty Weekend), playwright (In the Company of Men), and actor, in Detroit
- March 22 - John Rienstra, guard in NFL (1986-1992), in Grand Rapids
- June 2 - Mike Rogers, U.S. Congressman (2001-2015) and host of controversial CNN series Declassified (2017), in Livingston County, Michigan
- June 11 - Bruce Kimball, diver and coach who won a silver medal for the 10 meter platform at the 1984 Summer Olympics, in Ann Arbor, Michigan
- August 19 - Matthew Glave, actor (Picket Fences, ER, Stargate SG-1, Army Wives), in Saginaw
- August 22 - James DeBarge, R&B/soul singer and one of the members of the singing family vocal group DeBarge, in Detroit

=== Gallery of 1963 births ===
Mike Rogers

== Deaths ==
- January 27 - Andrew C. Baird, Wayne County Sheriff since 1940, at age 83 in Detroit
- January 29 - Robert Frost, poet and a teaching fellow at University of Michigan from 1921 to 1927, at age 88 in Boston
- February 28 - Judge Frank Albert Picard, at age 73 at his home in Saginaw
- March 2 - W.J. Maxey, head of the Michigan Social Welfare Department, at age 62 in Lansing
- March 3 - Henry Bodman, lawyer, banker and founder of Bodman PLC, at age 88 in Detroit
- June 7 - Henry M. Butzel, former Chief Justice of the Michigan Supreme Court, at 92 in Detroit
- July 7 - Doc Kearns, a native of Waterloo, Michigan, famed boxing manager for Jack Dempsey, Benny Leonard, and others, at age 80 in Miami
- August 1 - Theodore Roethke, Pulitzer Prize winning poet, Saginaw native, and University of Michigan alumnus, at age 59 in Bainbridge Island, Washington
- August 8 - Charles T. Fisher, automotive pioneer, at age 83 in Detroit
- September 9 - Willie Heston, University of Michigan halfback (1901-1904) and member of College Football Hall of Fame, at age 85 in Traverse City
- October 8 - Charles A. Roxborough, first African-American man elected to the Michigan Senate, at age 74
- December 14 - Dinah Washington, jazz and blues singer who was inducted into the Rock & Roll Hall of Fame in 1993, at age 39 in Detroit

=== Gallery of 1963 deaths ===
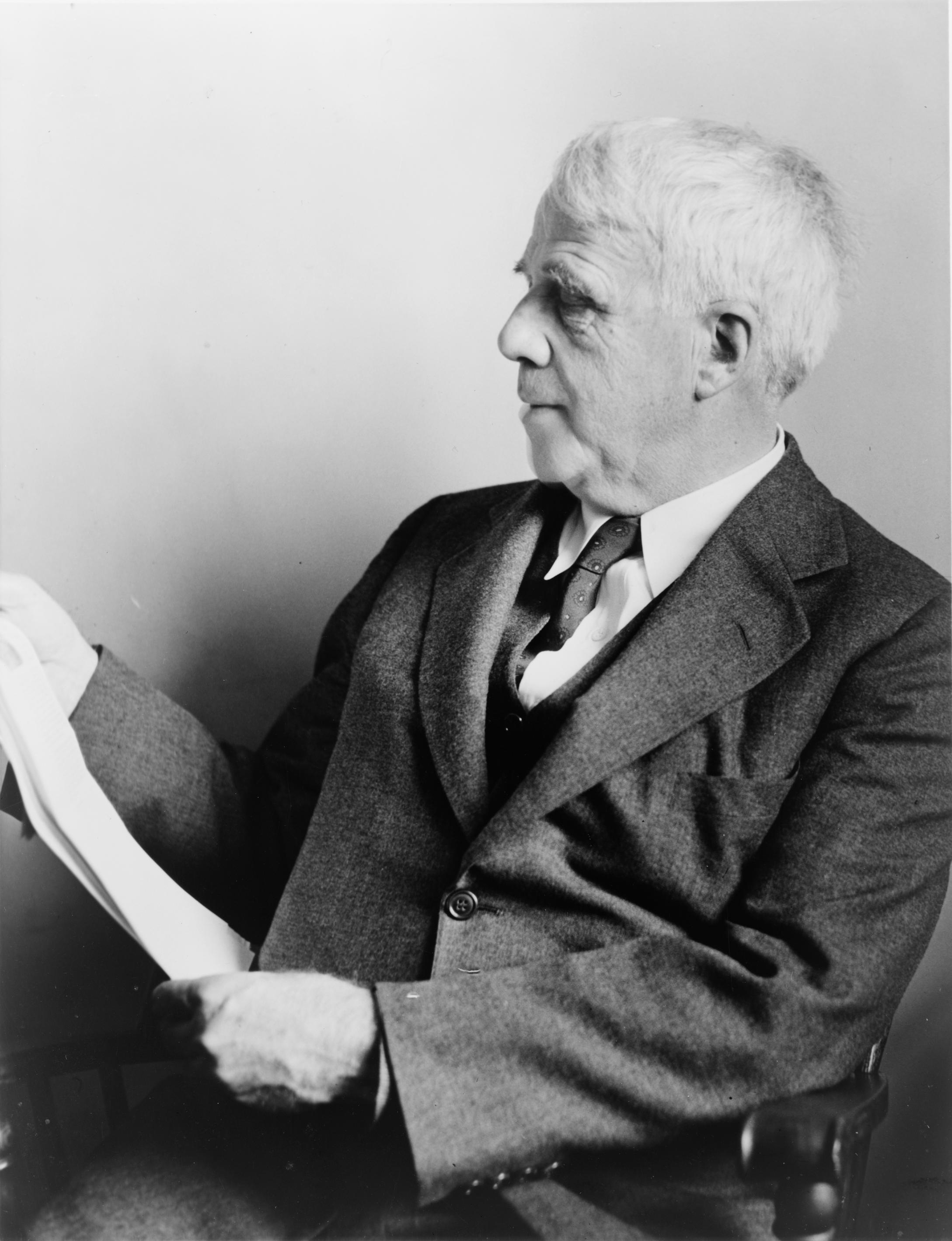
Robert Frost

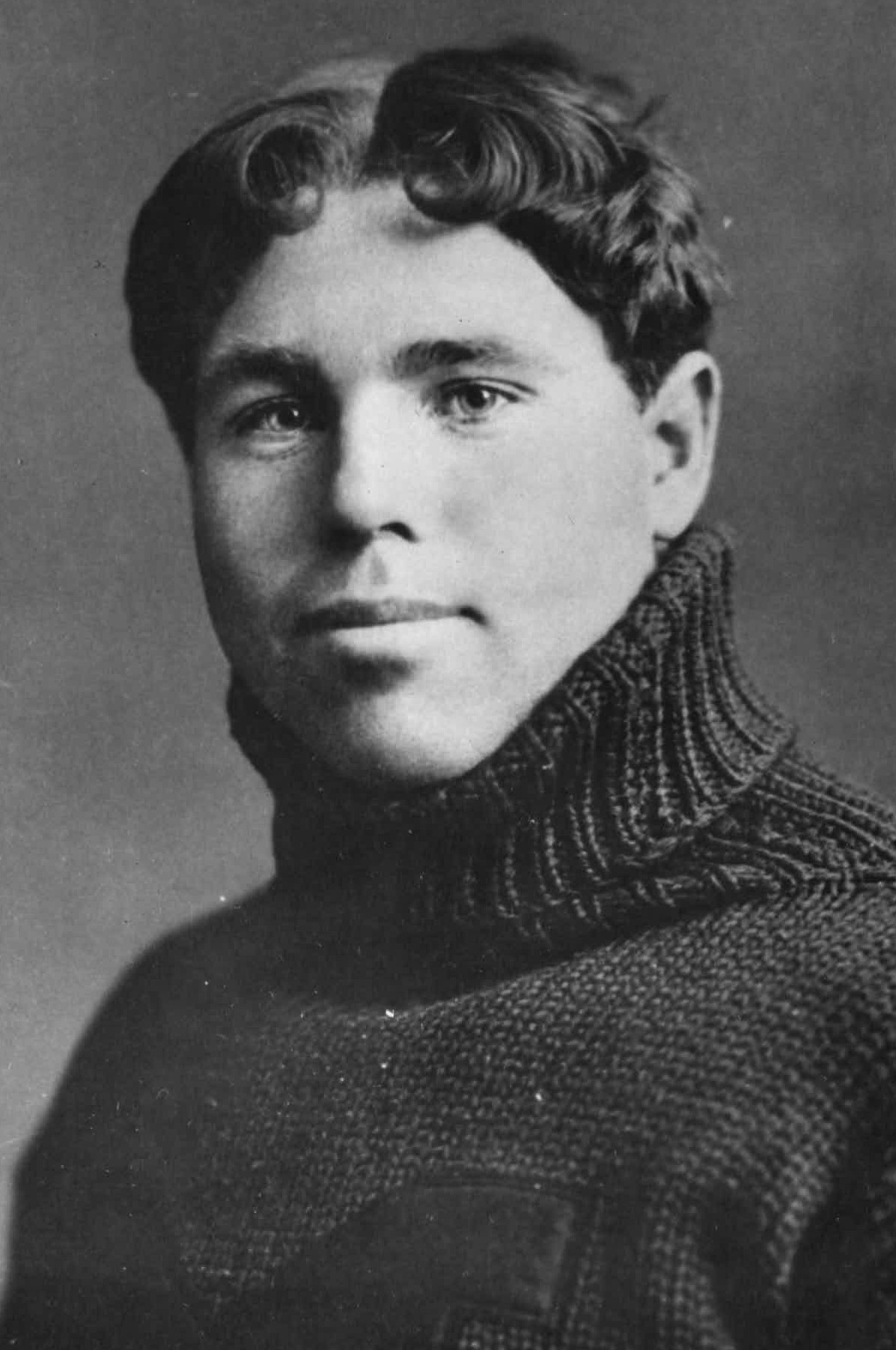
Willie Heston

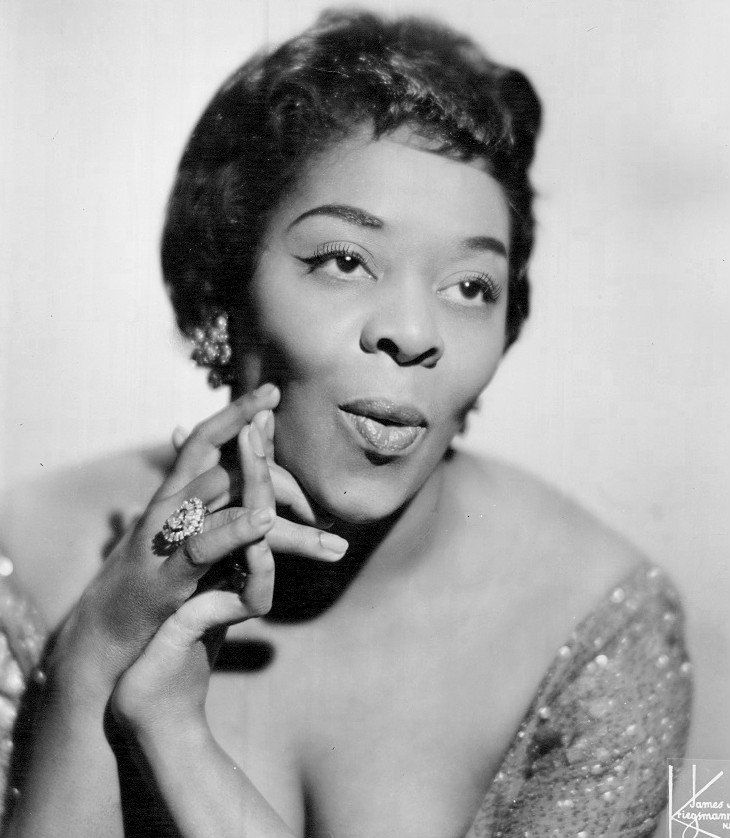
Dinah Washington

== See also ==
- History of Michigan
- History of Detroit
