= 1963 Stanley Cup Final =

1963 ice hockey championship series

	1	2	3	4	5	Total
Detroit Red Wings	2	2	3	2	1	1
Toronto Maple Leafs	4	4	2	4	3	4
- Location(s): Toronto: Maple Leaf Gardens (1, 2, 5); Detroit: Olympia (3, 4)
- Coaches: Detroit: Sid Abel; Toronto: Punch Imlach
- Captains: Detroit: Alex Delvecchio; Toronto: George Armstrong
- Dates: April 9–18, 1963
- Series-winning goal: Eddie Shack (13:28, third)
- Hall of Famers: Maple Leafs: George Armstrong (1975); Johnny Bower (1976); Dick Duff (2006); Tim Horton (1977); Red Kelly (1969); Dave Keon (1986); Frank Mahovlich (1981); Bob Pulford (1991); Allan Stanley (1981); Red Wings: Alex Delvecchio (1977); Bill Gadsby (1970); Gordie Howe (1972); Marcel Pronovost (1978); Terry Sawchuk (1971); Norm Ullman (1982); Coaches: Sid Abel (1969, player); Punch Imlach (1984); Officials: Neil Armstrong (1991); George Hayes (1988); Matt Pavelich (1987); Frank Udvari (1973)

The 1963 Stanley Cup Final was the championship series of the National Hockey League's (NHL) 1962–63 season, and the culmination of the 1963 Stanley Cup playoffs. It was contested by the defending champion Toronto Maple Leafs and the Detroit Red Wings. The Maple Leafs won the best-of-seven series, four games to one, to win the Stanley Cup, their second straight NHL championship and their 11th title overall.

== Paths to the Finals ==
Toronto defeated the Montreal Canadiens 4–1 to advance to the finals and Detroit defeated the Chicago Black Hawks 4–2

== Game summaries ==
Johnny Bower limited the Wings to 10 goals in the five games, and five different Leafs had multiple-goal games: Duff, Nevin, Stewart, Kelly and Keon.

The Leafs had finished first in the regular season, and were installed as 13–5 favourites by oddsmakers.

=== Game one ===
April 9	Detroit Red Wings	2–4	Toronto Maple Leafs	Maple Leaf Gardens	Recap

In the first 68 seconds, Dick Duff scored twice on Detroit's Terry Sawchuk, the fastest two goals to start a game in Stanley Cup history. The Leafs would suffer a second-period letdown but would win 4–2 to take the lead in the series. Because of the second period letdown, Punch Imlach would put the team through a morning practice the next morning.

Scoring summary
Period	Team	Goal	Assist(s)	Time	Score
1st	TOR	Dick Duff (3)	Dave Keon (4) and Allan Stanley (3)	00:49	1–0 TOR
1st	TOR	Dick Duff (4)	Tim Horton (1) and Allan Stanley (4)	01:08	2–0 TOR
1st	TOR	Bob Nevin (1) – sh	Unassisted	14:42	3–0 TOR
2nd	DET	Larry Jeffrey (2)	Norm Ullman (9) and Floyd Smith (2)	05:36	3–1 TOR
2nd	DET	Larry Jeffrey (3) – pp	Gordie Howe (7) and Norm Ullman (10)	08:05	3–2 TOR
3rd	TOR	Bob Nevin (2)	Bob Pulford (3) and Eddie Shack (1)	05:08	4–2 TOR
Penalty summary
Period	Team	Player	Penalty	Time	PIM
1st	DET	Bill Gadsby	Tripping	05:19	2:00
1st	TOR	Tim Horton	Holding	13:20	2:00
1st	DET	Pete Goegan	Tripping	18:50	2:00
1st	DET	Bill Gadsby	Holding	19:45	2:00
2nd	TOR	Eddie Shack	Charging	03:28	2:00
2nd	TOR	Bobby Baun	Holding	06:26	2:00
3rd	DET	Doug Barkley	Roughing	07:43	2:00
3rd	TOR	Ed Litzenberger	Roughing	07:43	2:00

Shots by period
Team	1	2	3	Total
Detroit	6	14	12	32
Toronto	13	8	6	27

=== Game two ===
April 11	Detroit Red Wings	2–4	Toronto Maple Leafs	Maple Leaf Gardens	Recap

The Leafs would again win 4–2 and would again have to have a morning after workout assigned by Imlach, with Ron Stewart scoring twice and Ed Litzenberger recording three points.

Scoring summary
Period	Team	Goal	Assist(s)	Time	Score
1st	TOR	Ed Litzenberger (1)	Bob Pulford (4) and Tim Horton (2)	05:31	1–0 TOR
1st	TOR	Ron Stewart (3)	Ed Litzenberger (1) and Red Kelly (5)	18:42	2–0 TOR
2nd	TOR	Bob Nevin (3)	Allan Stanley (5) and Tim Horton (3)	00:49	3–0 TOR
2nd	DET	Gordie Howe (5)	Alex Delvecchio (1) and Marcel Pronovost (1)	01:32	3–1 TOR
2nd	TOR	Ron Stewart (4) – pp	Ed Litzenberger (2) and Billy Harris (1)	08:55	4–1 TOR
3rd	DET	Gordie Howe (6)	Larry Jeffrey (3) and Norm Ullman (11)	02:03	4–2 TOR
Penalty summary
Period	Team	Player	Penalty	Time	PIM
1st	DET	Bill Gadsby	Charging	02:38	2:00
1st	TOR	Carl Brewer	High-sticking	02:38	2:00
1st	DET	Bobby Baun	Holding	09:53	2:00
2nd	DET	Norm Ullman	Holding	06:56	2:00
2nd	DET	Larry Jeffrey	Roughing	17:32	2:00
2nd	TOR	Bobby Baun	Roughing	17:32	2:00
3rd	DET	Bill Gadsby	Tripping	19:47	2:00

Shots by period
Team	1	2	3	Total
Detroit	7	12	8	27
Toronto	14	12	11	37

=== Game three ===
April 14	Toronto Maple Leafs	2–3	Detroit Red Wings	Detroit Olympia	Recap

The series now moved to Detroit. The team was sequestered out of town in a Toledo, Ohio hotel. The Red Wings, led by rookie centre Alex Faulkner's two goals, including the winner, captured the game 3–2. It was his third game-winning goal and all had been scored on Sundays. Faulkner was a native of Newfoundland and Howie Meeker, exclaimed that there would be "dancing in the streets tonight".

Scoring summary
Period	Team	Goal	Assist(s)	Time	Score
1st	DET	Vic Stasiuk (3)	Norm Ullman (12) and Floyd Smith (3)	00:33	1–0 DET
1st	TOR	Dave Keon (4)	Carl Brewer (1) and Dick Duff (1)	14:56	1–1
2nd	DET	Alex Faulkner (4)	Marcel Pronovost (2) and Bruce MacGregor (4)	08:13	2–1 DET
2nd	TOR	Tim Horton (1)	Red Kelly (6)	13:06	2–2
2nd	DET	Alex Faulkner (5)	Marcel Pronovost (2) and Andre Pronovost (4)	13:39	3–2 DET
3rd	None				
Penalty summary
Period	Team	Player	Penalty	Time	PIM
1st	TOR	Bob Pulford	Hooking	09:34	2:00
1st	DET	Gordie Howe	Cross-checking	16:44	2:00
2nd	TOR	Tim Horton	Hooking	09:35	2:00
2nd	TOR	Allan Stanley	Hooking	14:45	2:00
3rd	DET	Gordie Howe	High-sticking	02:07	2:00
3rd	TOR	Frank Mahovlich	High-sticking	02:07	2:00
3rd	DET	Pete Goegan	Roughing	02:37	2:00
3rd	TOR	Red Kelly	Roughing	02:37	2:00
3rd	TOR	Kent Douglas	Slashing	11:17	2:00

Shots by period
Team	1	2	3	Total
Toronto	11	11	10	32
Detroit	11	10	10	31

=== Game four ===
April 16	Toronto Maple Leafs	4–2	Detroit Red Wings	Detroit Olympia	Recap

The Leafs felt that they had let game three slip away due to overconfidence and were determined to not repeat the mistake in game four. The game was close, and was tied 2–2 until with ten minutes to go Dave Keon scored. Red Kelly scored his second goal of the game to make the score 4–2. On the way to the dressing room the Leafs' players were pelted with paper cups, programs and food containers.

Scoring summary
Period	Team	Goal	Assist(s)	Time	Score
1st	DET	Gordie Howe (7)	Alex Delvecchio (6) and Parker MacDonald (2)	02:54	1–0 DET
2nd	TOR	George Armstrong (3)	Dave Keon (5)	01:17	1–1
2nd	DET	Eddie Joyal (1) – pp	Gordie Howe (8)	02:38	2–1 DET
2nd	TOR	Red Kelly (1)	Bobby Baun (2) and Frank Mahovlich (4)	17:41	2–2
3rd	TOR	Dave Keon (5)	Unassisted	09:42	3–2 TOR
3rd	TOR	Red Kelly (2) – pp	Unassisted	17:45	4–2 TOR
Penalty summary
Period	Team	Player	Penalty	Time	PIM
1st	TOR	Frank Mahovlich	Hooking	08:08	2:00
1st	DET	Bill Gadsby	Holding	09:17	2:00
2nd	TOR	Bob Pulford	High-sticking	01:25	2:00
2nd	DET	Doug Barkley	Holding	04:12	2:00
2nd	DET	Doug Barkley	Tripping	09:22	2:00
2nd	TOR	Carl Brewer	Holding	14:08	2:00
2nd	DET	Gordie Howe	Roughing	18:01	2:00
2nd	TOR	Dick Duff	Spearing	18:01	2:00
3rd	TOR	Ed Litzenberger	Tripping	11:53	2:00
3rd	DET	Bill Gadsby	Holding	16:52	2:00

Shots by period
Team	1	2	3	Total
Toronto	13	10	10	33
Detroit	13	18	9	40

=== Game five ===
April 18	Detroit Red Wings	1–3	Toronto Maple Leafs	Maple Leaf Gardens	Recap

Back in Toronto, the Red Wings kept the score close. After Keon scored a short-handed goal, Alex Delvecchio scored for Detroit to tie the game. The game and series winner was scored by Eddie Shack with seven minutes to go on a deflection. Shack had scored the goal unintentionally as he later admitted. Keon then scored another short-handed goal to put the game out of reach for Detroit. The Leafs celebrated their second consecutive Stanley Cup by throwing Imlach, Harold Ballard and Stafford Smythe into the showers fully clothed. The team was given a victory parade along Bay Street with a reception at Toronto City Hall.

Scoring summary
Period	Team	Goal	Assist(s)	Time	Score
1st	TOR	Dave Keon (6) – sh	George Armstrong (5)	17:44	1–0 TOR
2nd	DET	Alex Delvecchio (3)	Gordie Howe (9) and Marcel Pronovost (4)	00:49	1–1
3rd	TOR	Eddie Shack (2)	Kent Douglas (1) and Bob Pulford (5)	13:28	2–1 TOR
3rd	TOR	Dave Keon (7) – sh – en	George Armstrong (6) and Allan Stanley (6)	19:55	3–1 TOR
Penalty summary
Period	Team	Player	Penalty	Time	PIM
1st	DET	Alex Faulkner	Holding	10:49	2:00
1st	TOR	Bob Pulford	Slashing	10:49	2:00
1st	DET	Gerry Odrowski	Tripping	11:01	2:00
1st	DET	Parker MacDonald	Hooking	14:09	2:00
1st	TOR	Allan Stanley	Elbowing	17:13	2:00
2nd	DET	Floyd Smith	Tripping	08:35	2:00
2nd	TOR	Eddie Shack	High-sticking	10:49	2:00
2nd	DET	Larry Jeffrey	Holding	13:55	2:00
3rd	DET	Gordie Howe	High-sticking	10:49	2:00
3rd	TOR	Ron Stewart	High-sticking	10:49	2:00
3rd	DET	Floyd Smith	Holding	15:33	2:00
3rd	TOR	Bob Pulford	Holding	18:07	2:00

Shots by period
Team	1	2	3	Total
Detroit	5	8	14	27
Toronto	10	4	14	28

As of 2019, this is the only one of the last seven big four championship series involving a Toronto team (all of which have been won by Toronto) which did not last exactly six games.

== Stanley Cup engraving ==
The 1963 Stanley Cup was presented to Maple Leafs captain George Armstrong by NHL President Clarence Campbell following the Maple Leafs 3–1 win over the Red Wings in game five.

The following Maple Leafs players and staff had their names engraved on the Stanley Cup

1962–63 Toronto Maple Leafs

=== Players ===
Centres

- 4 Leonard Red Kelly
- 14 Dave Keon
- 15 Billy Harris

Wingers

- 8 John MacMillan †
- 9 Dick Duff (A)
- 10 George Armstrong (Captain)
- 11 Bob Nevin
- 20 Bob Pulford
- 23 Eddie Shack
- 25 Ed Litzenberger
- 27 Frank Mahovlich
- 12 Ron Stewart

Defencemen

- 2 Carl Brewer
- 7 Miles Tim Horton
- 21 Bob Baun
- 16 Larry Hillman*
- 19 Kent Douglas
- 26 Allan Stanley (A)

Goaltenders

- 1 Johnny Bower
- 1 Don Simmons

=== Coaching and administrative staff ===
- Stafford Smythe (President/Owner), Harold Ballard (Exe. Vice President/Owner)
- John W. H. Bassett (Chairman/Owner)
- George Punch Imlach (Manager-Coach), Frank King Clancy (Asst. Manager-Coach)
- Bob Haggart (Trainer)
- Tom Nayler (Asst. Trainer), Hugh Holton (Stick Boy/Asst. Trainer)

=== Stanley Cup engraving ===
- * Larry Hillman played only 5 regular-season games and spent most of the year in the minors. His name was still engraved on the Stanley Cup.
- † John MacMillan was engraved as C. MacMILLAN, but his first name starts with a "J". MacMillan name was not corrected on the Replica Cup created in 1992–93.
- Toronto Maple Leafs was engraved as the TORONTO MAPLE LEAES, with an "E" instead of an "F". This mistake was corrected on the Replica Cup.
- Bob Davidson (Chief Scout), Dr. Karl Elieff (Physiotherapist), Dr. Jame Murphy, Dr. Hugh Smythe (Team Doctors) - left off
- The large shoulder with all the Stanley Cup-winning team names, first added in 1948, was replaced with a new, stronger shoulder in 1963.

== See also ==
- 1962–63 NHL season

== Notes ==
Preceded by Toronto Maple Leafs; 1962	Toronto Maple Leafs; Stanley Cup champions 1963	Succeeded by Toronto Maple Leafs; 1964
