= 1962–63 Montreal Canadiens season =

NHL hockey team season

1962–63 Montreal Canadiens
- League: 3rd NHL
- 1962–63 record: 28–19–23
- Home record: 15–10–10
- Road record: 13–9–13
- Goals for: 225
- Goals against: 183

Team information
- General manager: Frank J. Selke
- Coach: Toe Blake
- Captain: Jean Beliveau
- Arena: Montreal Forum

Team leaders
- Goals: Henri Richard (23)
- Assists: Henri Richard (50)
- Points: Henri Richard (73)
- Penalty minutes: Lou Fontinato (141)
- Wins: Jacques Plante (22)
- Goals against average: Jacques Plante (2.49)

The 1962–63 Montreal Canadiens season was the 54th season in franchise history. The team placed third in the regular season to qualify for the playoffs. The Canadiens were eliminated in semi-finals by the Toronto Maple Leafs 4 games to 1.

== Regular season ==
=== Final standings ===
National Hockey League
		GP	W	L	T	GF	GA	DIFF	Pts
1	Toronto Maple Leafs	70	35	23	12	221	180	+41	82
2	Chicago Black Hawks	70	32	21	17	194	178	+16	81
3	Montreal Canadiens	70	28	19	23	225	183	+42	79
4	Detroit Red Wings	70	32	25	13	200	194	+6	77
5	New York Rangers	70	22	36	12	211	233	−22	56
6	Boston Bruins	70	14	39	17	198	281	−83	45

=== Record vs. opponents ===
1962–63 NHL Records
Team	BOS	CHI	DET	MTL	NYR	TOR
Boston	—	2–10–2	2–7–5	2–7–5	4–7–3	4–8–2
Chicago	10–2–2	—	5–6–3	3–7–4	10–2–2	4–7–3
Detroit	7–2–5	6–5–3	—	3–9–2	9–3–2	7–6–1
Montreal	7–2–5	7–3–4	9–3–2	—	5–5–4	3–6–5
New York	7–4–3	2–10–2	3–9–2	5–5–4	—	5–8–1
Toronto	8–4–2	7–4–3	6–7–1	6–3–5	8–5–1	—

== Schedule and results ==
1962–63 regular season
October

Game	Result	Date	Score	Opponent	Record
1	L	October 11, 1962	0–5	@ Boston Bruins (1962–63)	0–1–0
2	W	October 13, 1962	6–3	New York Rangers (1962–63)	1–1–0
3	L	October 14, 1962	1–3	@ Detroit Red Wings (1962–63)	1–2–0
4	W	October 18, 1962	4–2	Toronto Maple Leafs (1962–63)	2–2–0
5	W	October 20, 1962	7–3	Boston Bruins (1962–63)	3–2–0
6	T	October 21, 1962	3–3	@ New York Rangers (1962–63)	3–2–1
7	T	October 23, 1962	4–4	@ Chicago Black Hawks (1962–63)	3–2–2
8	L	October 27, 1962	2–3	Chicago Black Hawks (1962–63)	3–3–2
9	W	October 31, 1962	4–3	@ Toronto Maple Leafs (1962–63)	4–3–2

November

Game	Result	Date	Score	Opponent	Record
10	L	November 1, 1962	1–3	Toronto Maple Leafs (1962–63)	4–4–2
11	T	November 3, 1962	3–3	New York Rangers (1962–63)	4–4–3
12	W	November 8, 1962	4–1	Detroit Red Wings (1962–63)	5–4–3
13	L	November 10, 1962	1–3	Chicago Black Hawks (1962–63)	5–5–3
14	W	November 11, 1962	4–2	@ Boston Bruins (1962–63)	6–5–3
15	L	November 14, 1962	2–4	@ Toronto Maple Leafs (1962–63)	6–6–3
16	T	November 18, 1962	1–1	@ Chicago Black Hawks (1962–63)	6–6–4
17	W	November 22, 1962	3–0	@ Detroit Red Wings (1962–63)	7–6–4
18	T	November 24, 1962	5–5	Boston Bruins (1962–63)	7–6–5
19	W	November 25, 1962	3–1	@ New York Rangers (1962–63)	8–6–5
20	T	November 29, 1962	4–4	Toronto Maple Leafs (1962–63)	8–6–6

December

Game	Result	Date	Score	Opponent	Record
21	W	December 1, 1962	2–1	Chicago Black Hawks (1962–63)	9–6–6
22	W	December 2, 1962	3–0	@ Boston Bruins (1962–63)	10–6–6
23	L	December 5, 1962	1–2	@ Toronto Maple Leafs (1962–63)	10–7–6
24	W	December 8, 1962	2–1	Detroit Red Wings (1962–63)	11–7–6
25	L	December 9, 1962	1–2	@ Chicago Black Hawks (1962–63)	11–8–6
26	T	December 13, 1962	1–1	Boston Bruins (1962–63)	11–8–7
27	L	December 15, 1962	2–4	New York Rangers (1962–63)	11–9–7
28	W	December 16, 1962	5–2	@ Boston Bruins (1962–63)	12–9–7
29	T	December 20, 1962	4–4	Toronto Maple Leafs (1962–63)	12–9–8
30	T	December 22, 1962	1–1	Chicago Black Hawks (1962–63)	12–9–9
31	T	December 23, 1962	2–2	@ Detroit Red Wings (1962–63)	12–9–10
32	W	December 25, 1962	6–0	@ Chicago Black Hawks (1962–63)	13–9–10
33	W	December 29, 1962	5–1	Detroit Red Wings (1962–63)	14–9–10
34	T	December 30, 1962	4–4	@ New York Rangers (1962–63)	14–9–11

January

Game	Result	Date	Score	Opponent	Record
35	W	January 3, 1963	4–1	Boston Bruins (1962–63)	15–9–11
36	T	January 5, 1963	2–2	New York Rangers (1962–63)	15–9–12
37	W	January 6, 1963	6–0	@ New York Rangers (1962–63)	16–9–12
38	L	January 10, 1963	2–3	Detroit Red Wings (1962–63)	16–10–12
39	W	January 12, 1963	7–2	Boston Bruins (1962–63)	17–10–12
40	T	January 13, 1963	2–2	@ Chicago Black Hawks (1962–63)	17–10–13
41	W	January 17, 1963	6–4	Toronto Maple Leafs (1962–63)	18–10–13
42	W	January 19, 1963	5–1	Detroit Red Wings (1962–63)	19–10–13
43	T	January 20, 1963	3–3	@ Boston Bruins (1962–63)	19–10–14
44	L	January 23, 1963	1–5	@ Toronto Maple Leafs (1962–63)	19–11–14
45	T	January 24, 1963	1–1	@ Detroit Red Wings (1962–63)	19–11–15
46	L	January 26, 1963	2–4	New York Rangers (1962–63)	19–12–15
47	W	January 27, 1963	3–1	@ Chicago Black Hawks (1962–63)	20–12–15
48	L	January 31, 1963	3–6	Toronto Maple Leafs (1962–63)	20–13–15

February

Game	Result	Date	Score	Opponent	Record
49	T	February 2, 1963	3–3	Chicago Black Hawks (1962–63)	20–13–16
50	W	February 3, 1963	6–2	@ Detroit Red Wings (1962–63)	21–13–16
51	L	February 6, 1963	3–6	@ New York Rangers (1962–63)	21–14–16
52	T	February 9, 1963	3–3	@ Toronto Maple Leafs (1962–63)	21–14–17
53	T	February 10, 1963	5–5	@ Boston Bruins (1962–63)	21–14–18
54	L	February 14, 1963	1–2	Boston Bruins (1962–63)	21–15–18
55	W	February 16, 1963	4–2	Chicago Black Hawks (1962–63)	22–15–18
56	W	February 17, 1963	6–1	@ Detroit Red Wings (1962–63)	23–15–18
57	L	February 20, 1963	1–2	@ Toronto Maple Leafs (1962–63)	23–16–18
58	W	February 23, 1963	6–3	New York Rangers (1962–63)	24–16–18

March

Game	Result	Date	Score	Opponent	Record
59	L	March 2, 1963	1–7	Detroit Red Wings (1962–63)	24–17–18
60	T	March 3, 1963	2–2	@ Chicago Black Hawks (1962–63)	24–17–19
61	W	March 5, 1963	4–3	@ Detroit Red Wings (1962–63)	25–17–19
62	W	March 7, 1963	8–0	Boston Bruins (1962–63)	26–17–19
63	L	March 9, 1963	2–5	New York Rangers (1962–63)	26–18–19
64	W	March 10, 1963	5–1	@ New York Rangers (1962–63)	27–18–19
65	T	March 14, 1963	3–3	Toronto Maple Leafs (1962–63)	27–18–20
66	W	March 16, 1963	5–3	Detroit Red Wings (1962–63)	28–18–20
67	T	March 17, 1963	2–2	@ Boston Bruins (1962–63)	28–18–21
68	T	March 20, 1963	3–3	@ Toronto Maple Leafs (1962–63)	28–18–22
69	T	March 23, 1963	4–4	Chicago Black Hawks (1962–63)	28–18–23
70	L	March 24, 1963	0–5	@ New York Rangers (1962–63)	28–19–23

Legend: Win (2 points) Loss (0 points) Tie (1 point)

== Player statistics ==
=== Regular season ===
==== Scoring ====
Player	Pos	GP	G	A	Pts	PIM
Henri Richard	C	67	23	50	73	57
Jean Beliveau	C	69	18	49	67	68
Dickie Moore	LW	67	24	26	50	61
Claude Provost	RW	67	20	30	50	26
Gilles Tremblay	LW	60	25	24	49	42
Bernie Geoffrion	RW	51	23	18	41	73
Bill Hicke	RW	70	17	22	39	39
Bobby Rousseau	RW	62	19	18	37	15
Ralph Backstrom	C	70	23	12	35	51
Donnie Marshall	LW	65	13	20	33	6
Jean-Guy Talbot	D	70	3	22	25	51
Jean Gauthier	D	65	1	17	18	46
J.C. Tremblay	D	69	1	17	18	10
Phil Goyette	C	32	5	8	13	2
Lou Fontinato	D	63	2	8	10	141
Tom Johnson	D	43	3	5	8	28
Red Berenson	C	37	2	6	8	15
Bill McCreary	LW	14	2	3	5	0
Terry Harper	D	14	1	1	2	10
Gerry Brisson	RW	4	0	2	2	4
Jacques Laperriere	D	6	0	2	2	2
Jacques Plante	G	56	0	1	1	2
Claude Larose	RW	4	0	0	0	0
Cesare Maniago	G	14	0	0	0	2
Ernie Wakely	G	1	0	0	0	0

==== Goaltending ====
Player	MIN	GP	W	L	T	GA	GAA	SO
Jacques Plante	3320	56	22	14	19	138	2.49	5
Cesare Maniago	820	14	5	5	4	42	3.07	0
Ernie Wakely	60	1	1	0	0	3	3.00	0
Team:	4200	70	28	19	23	183	2.61	5

=== Playoffs ===
==== Scoring ====
Player	Pos	GP	G	A	Pts	PIM
Jean Beliveau	C	5	2	1	3	2
Gilles Tremblay	LW	5	2	0	2	0
Henri Richard	C	5	1	1	2	2
Terry Harper	D	5	1	0	1	8
Bernie Geoffrion	RW	5	0	1	1	4
Jacques Laperriere	D	5	0	1	1	4
Dickie Moore	LW	5	0	1	1	2
Claude Provost	RW	5	0	1	1	2
Bobby Rousseau	RW	5	0	1	1	2
Ralph Backstrom	C	5	0	0	0	2
Red Berenson	C	5	0	0	0	0
Jean Gauthier	D	5	0	0	0	12
Phil Goyette	C	2	0	0	0	0
Bill Hicke	RW	5	0	0	0	0
Donnie Marshall	LW	5	0	0	0	0
Jacques Plante	G	5	0	0	0	0
Bill Sutherland	C	2	0	0	0	0
Jean-Guy Talbot	D	5	0	0	0	8
J.C. Tremblay	D	5	0	0	0	0

==== Goaltending ====
Player	MIN	GP	W	L	GA	GAA	SO
Jacques Plante	300	5	1	4	14	2.80	0
Team:	300	5	1	4	14	2.80	0

Note:

Pos = Position;GP = Games played; G = Goals; A = Assists; Pts = Points; PIM = Penalty minutes; +/- = Plus/minus; PPG = Power-play goals; SHG = Short-handed goals; GWG = Game-winning goals
Pos = Position;GP = Games played; Min, TOI = Minutes played; W = Wins; L = Losses; T,T/OT = Ties; OTL = Overtime losses; GA = Goals-against; GAA = Goals-against average; SO = Shutouts; SA = Shots against; SV = Shots saved;SV% = Save percentage;

== See also ==
- 1962–63 NHL season
