= 1962–63 Toronto Maple Leafs season =

NHL hockey team season (won Stanley Cup)

1962–63 Toronto Maple Leafs
- Stanley Cup champions
- Prince of Wales Trophy winners
- League: 1st NHL
- 1962–63 record: 35–23–12
- Home record: 21–8–6
- Road record: 14–15–6
- Goals for: 221
- Goals against: 180

Team information
- General manager: Punch Imlach
- Coach: Punch Imlach
- Captain: George Armstrong
- Alternate captains: Dick Duff; Bob Pulford; Allan Stanley
- Arena: Maple Leaf Gardens

Team leaders
- Goals: Frank Mahovlich (36)
- Assists: Red Kelly (40)
- Points: Frank Mahovlich (73)
- Penalty minutes: Carl Brewer (168)
- Wins: Johnny Bower (20)
- Goals against average: Don Simmons (2.46)

The 1962–63 Toronto Maple Leafs season saw the team finish first in the National Hockey League (NHL) with a record of 35 wins, 23 losses, and 12 ties for 82 points. It was the first time they had finished first overall in the league since 1948, and fifth year in a row the team made the playoffs. In the semi-finals they defeated their arch-rivals, the Montreal Canadiens, four games to one. They then defeated the Detroit Red Wings in five games to win their second straight Stanley Cup.

== Regular season ==
=== Season standings ===
National Hockey League
| | | GP | W | L | T | GF | GA | DIFF | Pts |
|---|---|---|---|---|---|---|---|---|---|
| 1 | Toronto Maple Leafs | 70 | 35 | 23 | 12 | 221 | 180 | +41 | 82 |
| 2 | Chicago Black Hawks | 70 | 32 | 21 | 17 | 194 | 178 | +16 | 81 |
| 3 | Montreal Canadiens | 70 | 28 | 19 | 23 | 225 | 183 | +42 | 79 |
| 4 | Detroit Red Wings | 70 | 32 | 25 | 13 | 200 | 194 | +6 | 77 |
| 5 | New York Rangers | 70 | 22 | 36 | 12 | 211 | 233 | −22 | 56 |
| 6 | Boston Bruins | 70 | 14 | 39 | 17 | 198 | 281 | −83 | 45 |

=== Record vs. opponents ===
1962–63 NHL Records
| Team | BOS | CHI | DET | MTL | NYR | TOR |
|---|---|---|---|---|---|---|
| Boston | — | 2–10–2 | 2–7–5 | 2–7–5 | 4–7–3 | 4–8–2 |
| Chicago | 10–2–2 | — | 5–6–3 | 3–7–4 | 10–2–2 | 4–7–3 |
| Detroit | 7–2–5 | 6–5–3 | — | 3–9–2 | 9–3–2 | 7–6–1 |
| Montreal | 7–2–5 | 7–3–4 | 9–3–2 | — | 5–5–4 | 3–6–5 |
| New York | 7–4–3 | 2–10–2 | 3–9–2 | 5–5–4 | — | 5–8–1 |
| Toronto | 8–4–2 | 7–4–3 | 6–7–1 | 6–3–5 | 8–5–1 | — |

== Schedule and results ==
1962–63 regular season
October: 3–5–1 (home: 1–2–1; road: 2–3–0)

| Game | Result | Date | Score | Opponent | Record | Pts | Recap |
|---|---|---|---|---|---|---|---|
| 1 | W | October 10, 1962 | 3–1 | @ Chicago Black Hawks (1962–63) | 1–0–0 | 2 | W1 |
| 2 | T | October 13, 1962 | 2–2 | Boston Bruins (1962–63) | 1–0–1 | 3 | T1 |
| 3 | L | October 14, 1962 | 3–5 | @ New York Rangers (1962–63) | 1–1–1 | 3 | L1 |
| 4 | L | October 18, 1962 | 2–4 | @ Montreal Canadiens (1962–63) | 1–2–1 | 3 | L2 |
| 5 | W | October 20, 1962 | 3–1 | Chicago Black Hawks (1962–63) | 2–2–1 | 5 | W1 |
| 6 | W | October 21, 1962 | 6–4 | @ Boston Bruins (1962–63) | 3–2–1 | 7 | W2 |
| 7 | L | October 27, 1962 | 1–5 | New York Rangers (1962–63) | 3–3–1 | 7 | L1 |
| 8 | L | October 28, 1962 | 0–2 | @ Detroit Red Wings (1962–63) | 3–4–1 | 7 | L2 |
| 9 | L | October 31, 1962 | 3–4 | Montreal Canadiens (1962–63) | 3–5–1 | 7 | L3 |

November: 7–4–2 (home: 4–1–1; road: 3–3–1)

| Game | Result | Date | Score | Opponent | Record | Pts | Recap |
|---|---|---|---|---|---|---|---|
| 10 | W | November 1, 1962 | 3–1 | @ Montreal Canadiens (1962–63) | 4–5–1 | 9 | W1 |
| 11 | L | November 3, 1962 | 3–7 | Detroit Red Wings (1962–63) | 4–6–1 | 9 | L1 |
| 12 | W | November 7, 1962 | 5–1 | @ New York Rangers (1962–63) | 5–6–1 | 11 | W1 |
| 13 | W | November 10, 1962 | 5–3 | New York Rangers (1962–63) | 6–6–1 | 13 | W2 |
| 14 | W | November 11, 1962 | 5–3 | @ Chicago Black Hawks (1962–63) | 7–6–1 | 15 | W3 |
| 15 | W | November 14, 1962 | 4–2 | Montreal Canadiens (1962–63) | 8–6–1 | 17 | W4 |
| 16 | W | November 17, 1962 | 3–2 | Detroit Red Wings (1962–63) | 9–6–1 | 19 | W5 |
| 17 | L | November 18, 1962 | 1–3 | @ New York Rangers (1962–63) | 9–7–1 | 19 | L1 |
| 18 | L | November 22, 1962 | 0–1 | @ Chicago Black Hawks (1962–63) | 9–8–1 | 19 | L2 |
| 19 | W | November 24, 1962 | 4–1 | New York Rangers (1962–63) | 10–8–1 | 21 | W1 |
| 20 | L | November 25, 1962 | 2–5 | @ Boston Bruins (1962–63) | 10–9–1 | 21 | L1 |
| 21 | T | November 29, 1962 | 4–4 | @ Montreal Canadiens (1962–63) | 10–9–2 | 22 | T1 |

December: 8–2–3 (home: 5–0–2; road: 3–2–1)

| Game | Result | Date | Score | Opponent | Record | Pts | Recap |
|---|---|---|---|---|---|---|---|
| 22 | W | December 1, 1962 | 8–2 | Boston Bruins (1962–63) | 11–9–2 | 24 | W1 |
| 23 | W | December 2, 1962 | 3–1 | @ Detroit Red Wings (1962–63) | 12–9–2 | 26 | W2 |
| 24 | W | December 5, 1962 | 2–1 | Montreal Canadiens (1962–63) | 13–9–2 | 28 | W3 |
| 25 | T | December 8, 1962 | 1–1 | Chicago Black Hawks (1962–63) | 13–9–3 | 29 | T1 |
| 26 | L | December 9, 1962 | 3–4 | @ Detroit Red Wings (1962–63) | 13–10–3 | 29 | L1 |
| 27 | W | December 15, 1962 | 8–2 | Boston Bruins (1962–63) | 14–10–3 | 31 | W1 |
| 28 | W | December 16, 1962 | 6–2 | @ Chicago Black Hawks (1962–63) | 15–10–3 | 33 | W2 |
| 29 | T | December 20, 1962 | 4–4 | @ Montreal Canadiens (1962–63) | 15–10–4 | 34 | T1 |
| 30 | W | December 22, 1962 | 4–2 | New York Rangers (1962–63) | 16–10–4 | 36 | W1 |
| 31 | W | December 23, 1962 | 5–4 | @ Boston Bruins (1962–63) | 17–10–4 | 38 | W2 |
| 32 | L | December 25, 1962 | 1–2 | @ Detroit Red Wings (1962–63) | 17–11–4 | 38 | L1 |
| 33 | W | December 26, 1962 | 5–4 | Detroit Red Wings (1962–63) | 18–11–4 | 40 | W1 |
| 34 | T | December 29, 1962 | 1–1 | Chicago Black Hawks (1962–63) | 18–11–5 | 41 | T1 |

January: 7–6–2 (home: 3–3–0; road: 4–3–2)

| Game | Result | Date | Score | Opponent | Record | Pts | Recap |
|---|---|---|---|---|---|---|---|
| 35 | L | January 1, 1963 | 0–3 | @ Boston Bruins (1962–63) | 18–12–5 | 41 | L1 |
| 36 | L | January 2, 1963 | 2–3 | @ New York Rangers (1962–63) | 18–13–5 | 41 | L2 |
| 37 | W | January 5, 1963 | 4–2 | Boston Bruins (1962–63) | 19–13–5 | 43 | W1 |
| 38 | W | January 6, 1963 | 5–1 | @ Chicago Black Hawks (1962–63) | 20–13–5 | 45 | W2 |
| 39 | L | January 9, 1963 | 1–3 | Chicago Black Hawks (1962–63) | 20–14–5 | 45 | L1 |
| 40 | W | January 12, 1963 | 2–1 | Detroit Red Wings (1962–63) | 21–14–5 | 47 | W1 |
| 41 | T | January 13, 1963 | 2–2 | @ Boston Bruins (1962–63) | 21–14–6 | 48 | T1 |
| 42 | L | January 17, 1963 | 4–6 | @ Montreal Canadiens (1962–63) | 21–15–6 | 48 | L1 |
| 43 | L | January 19, 1963 | 1–4 | Chicago Black Hawks (1962–63) | 21–16–6 | 48 | L2 |
| 44 | T | January 20, 1963 | 2–2 | @ Detroit Red Wings (1962–63) | 21–16–7 | 49 | T1 |
| 45 | W | January 23, 1963 | 5–1 | Montreal Canadiens (1962–63) | 22–16–7 | 51 | W1 |
| 46 | W | January 24, 1963 | 6–3 | @ Boston Bruins (1962–63) | 23–16–7 | 53 | W2 |
| 47 | L | January 26, 1963 | 2–5 | Boston Bruins (1962–63) | 23–17–7 | 53 | L1 |
| 48 | W | January 27, 1963 | 4–2 | @ New York Rangers (1962–63) | 24–17–7 | 55 | W1 |
| 49 | W | January 31, 1963 | 6–3 | @ Montreal Canadiens (1962–63) | 25–17–7 | 57 | W2 |

February: 4–4–2 (home: 4–1–2; road: 0–3–0)

| Game | Result | Date | Score | Opponent | Record | Pts | Recap |
|---|---|---|---|---|---|---|---|
| 50 | T | February 2, 1963 | 2–2 | New York Rangers (1962–63) | 25–17–8 | 58 | T1 |
| 51 | L | February 3, 1963 | 1–3 | @ Chicago Black Hawks (1962–63) | 25–18–8 | 58 | L1 |
| 52 | T | February 9, 1963 | 3–3 | Montreal Canadiens (1962–63) | 25–18–9 | 59 | T1 |
| 53 | L | February 10, 1963 | 1–2 | @ Detroit Red Wings (1962–63) | 25–19–9 | 59 | L1 |
| 54 | W | February 13, 1963 | 6–2 | Detroit Red Wings (1962–63) | 26–19–9 | 61 | W1 |
| 55 | W | February 16, 1963 | 4–2 | New York Rangers (1962–63) | 27–19–9 | 63 | W2 |
| 56 | L | February 17, 1963 | 1–4 | @ New York Rangers (1962–63) | 27–20–9 | 63 | L1 |
| 57 | W | February 20, 1963 | 2–1 | Montreal Canadiens (1962–63) | 28–20–9 | 65 | W1 |
| 58 | L | February 23, 1963 | 2–4 | Boston Bruins (1962–63) | 28–21–9 | 65 | L1 |
| 59 | W | February 27, 1963 | 6–3 | Chicago Black Hawks (1962–63) | 29–21–9 | 67 | W1 |

March: 6–2–3 (home: 4–1–1; road: 2–1–2)

| Game | Result | Date | Score | Opponent | Record | Pts | Recap |
|---|---|---|---|---|---|---|---|
| 60 | W | March 2, 1963 | 4–3 | New York Rangers (1962–63) | 30–21–9 | 69 | W2 |
| 61 | W | March 3, 1963 | 6–3 | @ Boston Bruins (1962–63) | 31–21–9 | 71 | W3 |
| 62 | W | March 6, 1963 | 4–0 | Boston Bruins (1962–63) | 32–21–9 | 73 | W4 |
| 63 | W | March 9, 1963 | 5–3 | Detroit Red Wings (1962–63) | 33–21–9 | 75 | W5 |
| 64 | T | March 10, 1963 | 1–1 | @ Chicago Black Hawks (1962–63) | 33–21–10 | 76 | T1 |
| 65 | T | March 14, 1963 | 3–3 | @ Montreal Canadiens (1962–63) | 33–21–11 | 77 | T2 |
| 66 | W | March 16, 1963 | 3–0 | Chicago Black Hawks (1962–63) | 34–21–11 | 79 | W1 |
| 67 | W | March 17, 1963 | 2–1 | @ New York Rangers (1962–63) | 35–21–11 | 81 | W2 |
| 68 | T | March 20, 1963 | 3–3 | Montreal Canadiens (1962–63) | 35–21–12 | 82 | T1 |
| 69 | L | March 23, 1963 | 1–2 | Detroit Red Wings (1962–63) | 35–22–12 | 82 | L1 |
| 70 | L | March 24, 1963 | 2–3 | @ Detroit Red Wings (1962–63) | 35–23–12 | 82 | L2 |

Legend: Win (2 points) Loss (0 points) Tie (1 point)

== Player statistics ==
=== Forwards ===
Note: GP = Games played; G = Goals; A = Assists; Pts = Points; PIM = Penalty Minutes

| Player | GP | G | A | PTS | PIM |
|---|---|---|---|---|---|
| Frank Mahovlich | 67 | 36 | 37 | 73 | 56 |
| Red Kelly | 66 | 20 | 40 | 60 | 8 |
| Dave Keon | 68 | 28 | 28 | 56 | 2 |
| Bob Pulford | 70 | 19 | 25 | 44 | 49 |
| George Armstrong | 70 | 19 | 24 | 43 | 27 |
| Dick Duff | 69 | 16 | 19 | 35 | 56 |
| Bob Nevin | 58 | 12 | 21 | 33 | 4 |
| Billy Harris | 65 | 8 | 24 | 32 | 22 |
| Ron Stewart | 63 | 16 | 16 | 32 | 26 |
| Eddie Shack | 63 | 16 | 9 | 25 | 97 |
| Ed Litzenberger | 58 | 5 | 13 | 18 | 10 |
| Bronco Horvath | 10 | 0 | 4 | 4 | 12 |
| John MacMillan | 6 | 1 | 1 | 2 | 6 |
| Red Armstrong | 7 | 1 | 1 | 2 | 2 |
| Jim Mikol | 4 | 0 | 1 | 1 | 2 |
| Andre Champagne | 2 | 0 | 0 | 0 | 0 |
| Bruce Draper | 1 | 0 | 0 | 0 | 0 |

=== Defencemen ===
Note: GP = Games played; G = Goals; A = Assists; Pts = Points; +/- = Plus/Minus; PIM = Penalty Minutes

| Player | GP | G | A | PTS | PIM |
|---|---|---|---|---|---|
| Carl Brewer | 70 | 2 | 23 | 25 | 168 |
| Tim Horton | 70 | 6 | 19 | 25 | 69 |
| Kent Douglas | 70 | 7 | 15 | 22 | 105 |
| Allan Stanley | 61 | 4 | 15 | 19 | 22 |
| Bobby Baun | 48 | 4 | 8 | 12 | 65 |
| Rod Seiling | 1 | 0 | 1 | 1 | 0 |
| Al Arbour | 4 | 1 | 0 | 1 | 4 |
| Larry Hillman | 5 | 0 | 0 | 0 | 2 |

=== Goaltending ===
Note: GP= Games played; W= Wins; L= Losses; T = Ties; SO = Shutouts; GAA = Goals Against

| Player | GP | W | L | T | SO | GAA |
|---|---|---|---|---|---|---|
| Johnny Bower | 42 | 20 | 15 | 7 | 1 | 2.60 |
| Don Simmons | 28 | 15 | 8 | 5 | 1 | 2.46 |

== Playoffs ==
=== Stanley Cup Finals ===
Johnny Bower limited the Wings to 10 goals in the five games, and five different Leafs had multiple-goal games: Duff, Nevin, Stewart, Kelly and Keon.

1963 Stanley Cup playoffs
Semifinals vs. (3) Montreal Canadiens – Maple Leafs win 4–1

| Game | Result | Date | Score | OT | Opponent | Series | Recap |
|---|---|---|---|---|---|---|---|
| 1 | W | March 26, 1963 | 3–1 | | Montreal Canadiens (1962–63) | 1–0 | W1 |
| 2 | W | March 28, 1963 | 3–2 | | Montreal Canadiens (1962–63) | 2–0 | W2 |
| 3 | W | March 30, 1963 | 2–0 | | @ Montreal Canadiens (1962–63) | 3–0 | W3 |
| 4 | L | April 2, 1963 | 1–3 | | @ Montreal Canadiens (1962–63) | 3–1 | L1 |
| 5 | W | April 4, 1963 | 5–0 | | Montreal Canadiens (1962–63) | 4–1 | W1 |

Stanley Cup Finals vs. (4) Detroit Red Wings – Maple Leafs win 4–1

| Game | Result | Date | Score | OT | Opponent | Series | Recap |
|---|---|---|---|---|---|---|---|
| 1 | W | April 9, 1963 | 4–2 | | Detroit Red Wings (1962–63) | 1–0 | W1 |
| 2 | W | April 11, 1963 | 4–2 | | Detroit Red Wings (1962–63) | 2–0 | W2 |
| 3 | L | April 14, 1963 | 2–3 | | @ Detroit Red Wings (1962–63) | 2–1 | L1 |
| 4 | W | April 16, 1963 | 4–2 | | @ Detroit Red Wings (1962–63) | 3–1 | W1 |
| 5 | W | April 18, 1963 | 3–1 | | Detroit Red Wings (1962–63) | 4–1 | W2 |

Legend: Win Loss

== Awards and records ==
- Carl Brewer, Runner-Up, Norris Trophy
- Kent Douglas, Calder Memorial Trophy
- Dave Keon, Lady Byng Trophy
