= 1962–63 New York Rangers season =

NHL hockey team season

1962–63 New York Rangers
- League: 5th NHL
- 1962–63 record: 22–36–12
- Home record: 12–17–6
- Road record: 10–19–6
- Goals for: 211
- Goals against: 233

Team information
- General manager: Muzz Patrick
- Coach: Muzz Patrick; Red Sullivan
- Captain: Andy Bathgate
- Arena: Madison Square Garden

Team leaders
- Goals: Camille Henry (37)
- Assists: Andy Bathgate (46)
- Points: Andy Bathgate (81)
- Penalty minutes: Doug Harvey (92)
- Wins: Gump Worsley (22)
- Goals against average: Gump Worsley (3.27)

The 1962–63 New York Rangers season was the franchise's 37th season. New York finished in fifth place in the NHL with 56 points and did not qualify for the playoffs for the first time since the 1960–61 season.

== Regular season ==
=== Final standings ===
National Hockey League
		GP	W	L	T	GF	GA	DIFF	Pts
1	Toronto Maple Leafs	70	35	23	12	221	180	+41	82
2	Chicago Black Hawks	70	32	21	17	194	178	+16	81
3	Montreal Canadiens	70	28	19	23	225	183	+42	79
4	Detroit Red Wings	70	32	25	13	200	194	+6	77
5	New York Rangers	70	22	36	12	211	233	−22	56
6	Boston Bruins	70	14	39	17	198	281	−83	45

=== Record vs. opponents ===
1962–63 NHL Records
Team	BOS	CHI	DET	MTL	NYR	TOR
Boston	—	2–10–2	2–7–5	2–7–5	4–7–3	4–8–2
Chicago	10–2–2	—	5–6–3	3–7–4	10–2–2	4–7–3
Detroit	7–2–5	6–5–3	—	3–9–2	9–3–2	7–6–1
Montreal	7–2–5	7–3–4	9–3–2	—	5–5–4	3–6–5
New York	7–4–3	2–10–2	3–9–2	5–5–4	—	5–8–1
Toronto	8–4–2	7–4–3	6–7–1	6–3–5	8–5–1	—

== Schedule and results ==
1962–63 regular season
October: 2–5–1 (home: 1–3–1; road: 1–2–0)

Game	October	Opponent	Score	Record
1	11	Detroit Red Wings	2–1	0–1–0
2	13	@ Montreal Canadiens	6–3	0–2–0
3	14	Toronto Maple Leafs	5–3	1–2–0
4	17	Chicago Black Hawks	5–1	1–3–0
5	21	Montreal Canadiens	3–3	1–3–1
6	27	@ Toronto Maple Leafs	5–1	2–3–1
7	28	Chicago Black Hawks	5–3	2–4–1
8	30	@ Chicago Black Hawks	5–3	2–5–1

November: 6–7–1 (home: 3–4–0; road: 3–3–1)

Game	November	Opponent	Score	Record
9	1	@ Detroit Red Wings	4–0	2–6–1
10	3	@ Montreal Canadiens	3–3	2–6–2
11	4	@ Boston Bruins	4–3	3–6–2
12	7	Toronto Maple Leafs	5–1	3–7–2
13	10	@ Toronto Maple Leafs	5–3	3–8–2
14	11	Detroit Red Wings	3–2	3–9–2
15	14	Boston Bruins	6–2	4–9–2
16	17	Chicago Black Hawks	4–3	4–10–2
17	18	Toronto Maple Leafs	3–1	5–10–2
18	21	Boston Bruins	4–2	6–10–2
19	22	@ Boston Bruins	7–1	7–10–2
20	24	@ Toronto Maple Leafs	4–1	7–11–2
21	25	Montreal Canadiens	3–1	7–12–2
22	29	@ Detroit Red Wings	5–0	8–12–2

December: 3–7–4 (home: 2–2–2; road: 1–5–2)

Game	December	Opponent	Score	Record
23	2	@ Chicago Black Hawks	5–1	8–13–2
24	5	Detroit Red Wings	3–3	8–13–3
25	8	@ Boston Bruins	3–3	8–13–4
26	9	Boston Bruins	4–2	8–14–4
27	12	@ Chicago Black Hawks	4–3	8–15–4
28	13	@ Detroit Red Wings	3–2	8–16–4
29	15	@ Montreal Canadiens	4–2	9–16–4
30	16	Detroit Red Wings	5–2	10–16–4
31	22	@ Toronto Maple Leafs	4–2	10–17–4
32	23	Chicago Black Hawks	3–1	10–18–4
33	25	@ Boston Bruins	6–2	10–19–4
34	27	Boston Bruins	9–3	11–19–4
35	30	Montreal Canadiens	4–4	11–19–5
36	31	@ Detroit Red Wings	1–1	11–19–6

January: 3–6–2 (home: 1–3–1; road: 2–3–1)

Game	January	Opponent	Score	Record
37	2	Toronto Maple Leafs	3–2	12–19–6
38	5	@ Montreal Canadiens	2–2	12–19–7
39	6	Montreal Canadiens	6–0	12–20–7
40	12	@ Chicago Black Hawks	3–1	12–21–7
41	13	@ Detroit Red Wings	4–2	12–22–7
42	19	@ Boston Bruins	5–3	13–22–7
43	20	@ Chicago Black Hawks	6–2	13–23–7
44	23	Chicago Black Hawks	3–3	13–23–8
45	26	@ Montreal Canadiens	4–2	14–23–8
46	27	Toronto Maple Leafs	4–2	14–24–8
47	30	Detroit Red Wings	6–1	14–25–8

February: 4–6–3 (home: 2–2–2; road: 2–4–1)

Game	February	Opponent	Score	Record
48	2	@ Toronto Maple Leafs	2–2	14–25–9
49	3	Boston Bruins	6–4	14–26–9
50	6	Montreal Canadiens	6–3	15–26–9
51	9	Chicago Black Hawks	3–3	15–26–10
52	10	@ Chicago Black Hawks	4–2	15–27–10
53	12	@ Boston Bruins	6–3	15–28–10
54	16	@ Toronto Maple Leafs	4–2	15–29–10
55	17	Toronto Maple Leafs	4–1	16–29–10
56	20	Boston Bruins	3–3	16–29–11
57	23	@ Montreal Canadiens	6–3	16–30–11
58	24	Detroit Red Wings	3–2	16–31–11
59	26	@ Detroit Red Wings	4–3	17–31–11
60	28	@ Chicago Black Hawks	6–1	18–31–11

March: 4–5–1 (home: 3–3–0; road: 1–2–1)

Game	March	Opponent	Score	Record
61	2	@ Toronto Maple Leafs	4–3	18–32–11
62	3	Detroit Red Wings	3–2	18–33–11
63	6	Chicago Black Hawks	5–2	19–33–11
64	9	@ Montreal Canadiens	5–2	20–33–11
65	10	Montreal Canadiens	5–1	20–34–11
66	14	@ Detroit Red Wings	9–4	20–35–11
67	17	Toronto Maple Leafs	2–1	20–36–11
68	20	Boston Bruins	5–1	21–36–11
69	21	@ Boston Bruins	2–2	21–36–12
70	24	Montreal Canadiens	5–0	22–36–12

Legend: Win (2 points) Loss (0 points) Tie (1 point)

== Player statistics ==
Skaters

Regular season
Player	GP	G	A	Pts	PIM
Andy Bathgate	70	35	46	81	54
Camille Henry	60	37	23	60	8
Earl Ingarfield	69	19	24	43	40
Doug Harvey	68	4	35	39	92
Dean Prentice^{‡}	49	13	25	38	18
Andy Hebenton	70	15	22	37	8
Rod Gilbert	70	11	20	31	20
Harry Howell	70	5	20	25	55
Dave Balon	70	11	13	24	72
Don McKenney^{†}	21	8	16	24	4
Bronco Horvath^{‡}	41	7	15	22	34
Jean Ratelle	48	11	9	20	8
Larry Cahan	56	6	14	20	47
Jim Neilson	69	5	11	16	38
Albert Langlois	60	2	14	16	62
Ken Schinkel	69	6	9	15	15
Vic Hadfield	36	5	6	11	32
Leon Rochefort	23	5	4	9	6
Ted Hampson	46	4	2	6	2
Don Johns	6	0	4	4	6
Bryan Hextall Jr.	21	0	2	2	10
Ralph Keller	3	1	0	1	6
Mel Pearson	5	1	0	1	6
Duane Rupp	2	0	0	0	0

Goaltenders

Regular season
Player	GP	TOI	W	L	T	GA	GAA	SA	SV%	SO
Lorne Worsley	67	3980	22	34	10	217	3.27	2534	.914	2
Marcel Paille	3	180	0	1	2	10	3.33	107	.907	0
Marcel Pelletier	2	40	0	1	0	3	4.50	27	.889	0

^{†}Denotes player spent time with another team before joining Rangers. Stats reflect time with Rangers only.
^{‡}Traded mid-season. Stats reflect time with Rangers only.

Note:

Pos = Position;GP = Games played; G = Goals; A = Assists; Pts = Points; PIM = Penalty minutes; +/- = Plus/minus; PPG = Power-play goals; SHG = Short-handed goals; GWG = Game-winning goals
Pos = Position;GP = Games played; Min, TOI = Minutes played; W = Wins; L = Losses; T,T/OT = Ties; OTL = Overtime losses; GA = Goals-against; GAA = Goals-against average; SO = Shutouts; SA = Shots against; SV = Shots saved;SV% = Save percentage;

== See also ==
- 1962–63 NHL season
