= 1962–63 Boston Bruins season =

NHL team season

1962–63 Boston Bruins
- League: 6th NHL
- 1962–63 record: 14–39–17
- Home record: 7–18–10
- Road record: 7–21–7
- Goals for: 198
- Goals against: 281

Team information
- General manager: Lynn Patrick
- Coach: Phil Watson
- Captain: Don McKenney
- Arena: Boston Garden

Team leaders
- Goals: John Bucyk (27)
- Assists: John Bucyk (39)
- Points: John Bucyk (66)
- Penalty minutes: Ted Green (117)
- Wins: Eddie Johnston (11)
- Goals against average: Bob Perreault (3.82)

The 1962–63 Boston Bruins season was the Bruins' 39th season in the NHL The Bruins missed the playoffs for the fourth consecutive season for the first time in franchise history.

== Regular season ==
=== Final standings ===
National Hockey League
		GP	W	L	T	GF	GA	DIFF	Pts
1	Toronto Maple Leafs	70	35	23	12	221	180	+41	82
2	Chicago Black Hawks	70	32	21	17	194	178	+16	81
3	Montreal Canadiens	70	28	19	23	225	183	+42	79
4	Detroit Red Wings	70	32	25	13	200	194	+6	77
5	New York Rangers	70	22	36	12	211	233	−22	56
6	Boston Bruins	70	14	39	17	198	281	−83	45

=== Record vs. opponents ===
1962–63 NHL Records
Team	BOS	CHI	DET	MTL	NYR	TOR
Boston	—	2–10–2	2–7–5	2–7–5	4–7–3	4–8–2
Chicago	10–2–2	—	5–6–3	3–7–4	10–2–2	4–7–3
Detroit	7–2–5	6–5–3	—	3–9–2	9–3–2	7–6–1
Montreal	7–2–5	7–3–4	9–3–2	—	5–5–4	3–6–5
New York	7–4–3	2–10–2	3–9–2	5–5–4	—	5–8–1
Toronto	8–4–2	7–4–3	6–7–1	6–3–5	8–5–1	—

== Schedule and results ==
1962–63 regular season
October

Game	Result	Date	Score	Opponent	Record
1	W	October 11, 1962	5–0	Montreal Canadiens (1962–63)	1–0–0
2	T	October 13, 1962	2–2	@ Toronto Maple Leafs (1962–63)	1–0–1
3	T	October 14, 1962	2–2	Chicago Black Hawks (1962–63)	1–0–2
4	L	October 18, 1962	3–5	@ Detroit Red Wings (1962–63)	1–1–2
5	L	October 20, 1962	3–7	@ Montreal Canadiens (1962–63)	1–2–2
6	L	October 21, 1962	4–6	Toronto Maple Leafs (1962–63)	1–3–2
7	T	October 25, 1962	3–3	Detroit Red Wings (1962–63)	1–3–3

November

Game	Result	Date	Score	Opponent	Record
8	L	November 1, 1962	2–4	Chicago Black Hawks (1962–63)	1–4–3
9	L	November 4, 1962	3–4	New York Rangers (1962–63)	1–5–3
10	T	November 7, 1962	3–3	@ Chicago Black Hawks (1962–63)	1–5–4
11	T	November 10, 1962	3–3	Detroit Red Wings (1962–63)	1–5–5
12	L	November 11, 1962	2–4	Montreal Canadiens (1962–63)	1–6–5
13	L	November 14, 1962	2–6	@ New York Rangers (1962–63)	1–7–5
14	L	November 18, 1962	1–3	Detroit Red Wings (1962–63)	1–8–5
15	L	November 21, 1962	2–4	@ New York Rangers (1962–63)	1–9–5
16	L	November 22, 1962	1–7	New York Rangers (1962–63)	1–10–5
17	T	November 24, 1962	5–5	@ Montreal Canadiens (1962–63)	1–10–6
18	W	November 25, 1962	5–2	Toronto Maple Leafs (1962–63)	2–10–6
19	L	November 29, 1962	0–5	Chicago Black Hawks (1962–63)	2–11–6

December

Game	Result	Date	Score	Opponent	Record
20	L	December 1, 1962	2–8	@ Toronto Maple Leafs (1962–63)	2–12–6
21	L	December 2, 1962	0–3	Montreal Canadiens (1962–63)	2–13–6
22	L	December 5, 1962	4–5	@ Chicago Black Hawks (1962–63)	2–14–6
23	L	December 6, 1962	3–5	@ Detroit Red Wings (1962–63)	2–15–6
24	T	December 8, 1962	3–3	New York Rangers (1962–63)	2–15–7
25	W	December 9, 1962	4–2	@ New York Rangers (1962–63)	3–15–7
26	T	December 13, 1962	1–1	@ Montreal Canadiens (1962–63)	3–15–8
27	L	December 15, 1962	2–8	@ Toronto Maple Leafs (1962–63)	3–16–8
28	L	December 16, 1962	2–5	Montreal Canadiens (1962–63)	3–17–8
29	L	December 19, 1962	2–3	@ Chicago Black Hawks (1962–63)	3–18–8
30	W	December 20, 1962	5–3	@ Detroit Red Wings (1962–63)	4–18–8
31	L	December 23, 1962	4–5	Toronto Maple Leafs (1962–63)	4–19–8
32	W	December 25, 1962	6–2	New York Rangers (1962–63)	5–19–8
33	L	December 27, 1962	3–9	@ New York Rangers (1962–63)	5–20–8
34	L	December 30, 1962	2–4	@ Chicago Black Hawks (1962–63)	5–21–8

January

Game	Result	Date	Score	Opponent	Record
35	W	January 1, 1963	3–0	Toronto Maple Leafs (1962–63)	6–21–8
36	L	January 3, 1963	1–4	@ Montreal Canadiens (1962–63)	6–22–8
37	L	January 5, 1963	2–4	@ Toronto Maple Leafs (1962–63)	6–23–8
38	T	January 6, 1963	5–5	@ Detroit Red Wings (1962–63)	6–23–9
39	W	January 10, 1963	5–4	Chicago Black Hawks (1962–63)	7–23–9
40	L	January 12, 1963	2–7	@ Montreal Canadiens (1962–63)	7–24–9
41	T	January 13, 1963	2–2	Toronto Maple Leafs (1962–63)	7–24–10
42	W	January 16, 1963	5–4	@ Chicago Black Hawks (1962–63)	8–24–10
43	L	January 17, 1963	3–5	@ Detroit Red Wings (1962–63)	8–25–10
44	L	January 19, 1963	3–5	New York Rangers (1962–63)	8–26–10
45	T	January 20, 1963	3–3	Montreal Canadiens (1962–63)	8–26–11
46	L	January 24, 1963	3–6	Toronto Maple Leafs (1962–63)	8–27–11
47	W	January 26, 1963	5–2	@ Toronto Maple Leafs (1962–63)	9–27–11
48	L	January 27, 1963	3–5	Detroit Red Wings (1962–63)	9–28–11
49	L	January 31, 1963	2–9	Chicago Black Hawks (1962–63)	9–29–11

February

Game	Result	Date	Score	Opponent	Record
50	T	February 2, 1963	4–4	Detroit Red Wings (1962–63)	9–29–12
51	W	February 3, 1963	6–4	@ New York Rangers (1962–63)	10–29–12
52	T	February 7, 1963	3–3	@ Detroit Red Wings (1962–63)	10–29–13
53	T	February 10, 1963	5–5	Montreal Canadiens (1962–63)	10–29–14
54	W	February 12, 1963	6–3	New York Rangers (1962–63)	11–29–14
55	W	February 14, 1963	2–1	@ Montreal Canadiens (1962–63)	12–29–14
56	L	February 16, 1963	1–3	@ Detroit Red Wings (1962–63)	12–30–14
57	L	February 17, 1963	1–3	@ Chicago Black Hawks (1962–63)	12–31–14
58	T	February 20, 1963	3–3	@ New York Rangers (1962–63)	12–31–15
59	W	February 23, 1963	4–2	@ Toronto Maple Leafs (1962–63)	13–31–15
60	L	February 24, 1963	3–4	@ Chicago Black Hawks (1962–63)	13–32–15
61	W	February 28, 1963	5–3	Detroit Red Wings (1962–63)	14–32–15

March

Game	Result	Date	Score	Opponent	Record
62	L	March 3, 1963	3–6	Toronto Maple Leafs (1962–63)	14–33–15
63	L	March 6, 1963	0–4	@ Toronto Maple Leafs (1962–63)	14–34–15
64	L	March 7, 1963	0–8	@ Montreal Canadiens (1962–63)	14–35–15
65	L	March 10, 1963	3–4	Detroit Red Wings (1962–63)	14–36–15
66	L	March 14, 1963	0–2	Chicago Black Hawks (1962–63)	14–37–15
67	T	March 17, 1963	2–2	Montreal Canadiens (1962–63)	14–37–16
68	L	March 20, 1963	1–5	@ New York Rangers (1962–63)	14–38–16
69	T	March 21, 1963	2–2	New York Rangers (1962–63)	14–38–17
70	L	March 24, 1963	3–4	Chicago Black Hawks (1962–63)	14–39–17

Legend: Win (2 points) Loss (0 points) Tie (1 point)

== Player statistics ==
=== Regular season ===
Scoring

Player	Pos	GP	G	A	Pts	PIM
John Bucyk	LW	69	27	39	66	36
Murray Oliver	C	65	22	40	62	38
Tommy Williams	RW	69	23	20	43	11
Jean-Guy Gendron	LW	66	21	22	43	42
Jerry Toppazzini	RW	65	17	18	35	6
Don McKenney	C	41	14	19	33	2
Forbes Kennedy	C	49	12	18	30	46
Doug Mohns	LW/D	68	7	23	30	63
Leo Boivin	D	62	2	24	26	48
Charlie Burns	C	68	12	10	22	13
Bobby Leiter	C	51	9	13	22	34
Irv Spencer	D	69	5	17	22	34
Cliff Pennington	C	27	7	10	17	4
Wayne Hicks	RW	65	7	9	16	14
Dean Prentice	LW	19	6	9	15	4
Ted Green	D	70	1	11	12	117
Ed Westfall	D/RW	48	1	11	12	34
Warren Godfrey	D	66	2	9	11	56
Wayne Connelly	C	18	2	6	8	2
Don Blackburn	LW	6	0	5	5	4
Pat Stapleton	D	21	0	3	3	8
Andre Pronovost	LW	21	0	2	2	6
Matt Ravlich	D	2	1	0	1	0
Jeannot Gilbert	C	5	0	0	0	4
Eddie Johnston	G	50	0	0	0	10
Bob Perreault	G	22	0	0	0	0

Goaltending

Player	MIN	GP	W	L	T	GA	GAA	SO
Eddie Johnston	2913	50	11	27	10	193	3.98	1
Bob Perreault	1287	22	3	12	7	82	3.82	1
Team:	4200	70	14	39	17	275	3.93	2

Note:

Pos = Position;GP = Games played; G = Goals; A = Assists; Pts = Points; PIM = Penalty minutes; +/- = Plus/minus; PPG = Power-play goals; SHG = Short-handed goals; GWG = Game-winning goals
Pos = Position;GP = Games played; Min, TOI = Minutes played; W = Wins; L = Losses; T,T/OT = Ties; OTL = Overtime losses; GA = Goals-against; GAA = Goals-against average; SO = Shutouts; SA = Shots against; SV = Shots saved;SV% = Save percentage;

== See also ==
- 1962–63 NHL season
