= Allan Stanley =

Canadian ice hockey player (1926–2013)

- Hockey Hall of Fame, 1981
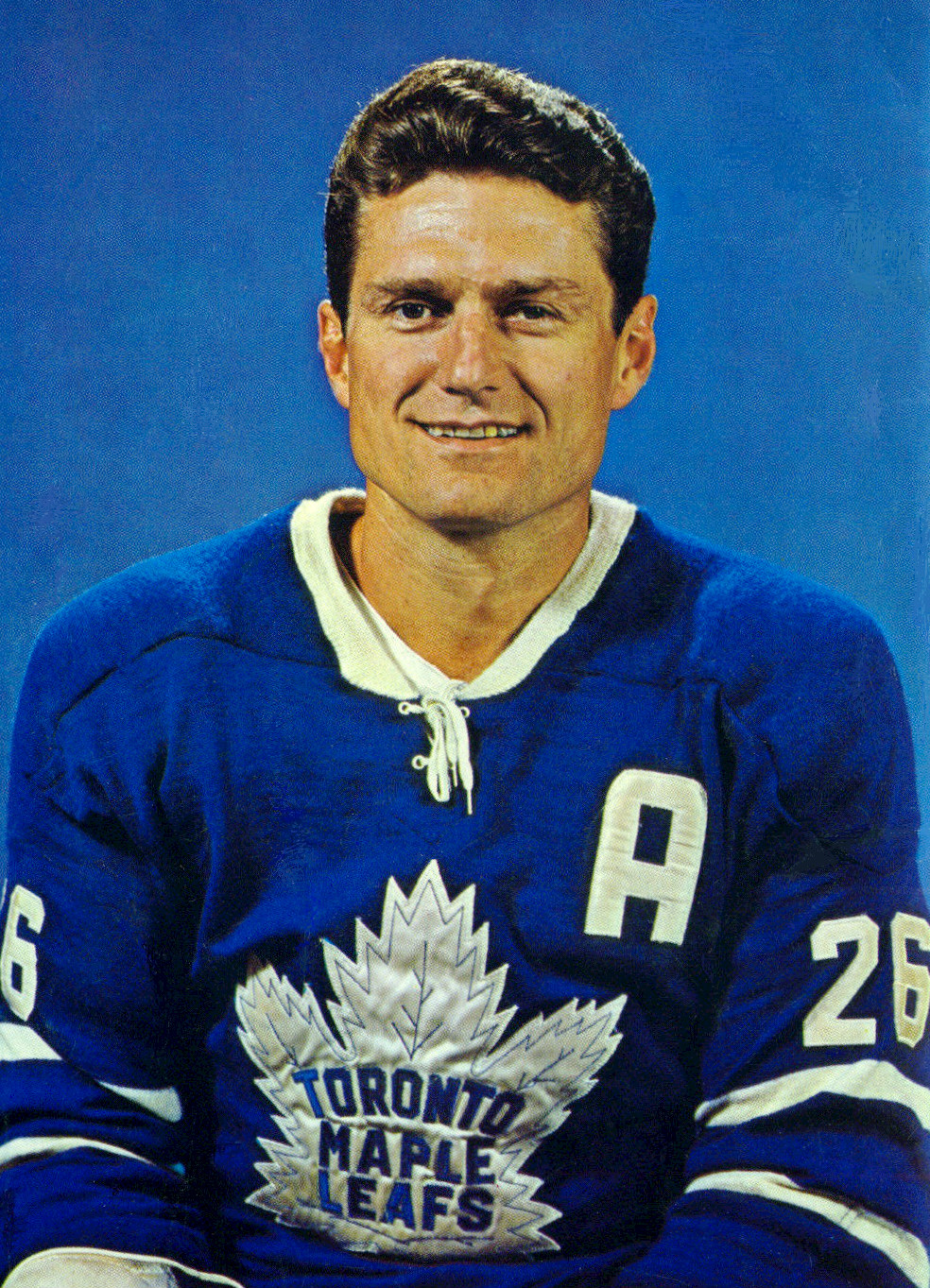
- Stanley with the Toronto Maple Leafs, c. 1963
- Born: March 1, 1926 Timmins, Ontario, Canada
- Died: October 18, 2013 (aged 87) Bobcaygeon, Ontario, Canada
- Height: 6 ft 2 in (188 cm)
- Weight: 182 lb (83 kg; 13 st 0 lb)
- Position: Defence
- Shot: Left
- Played for: New York Rangers; Chicago Black Hawks; Boston Bruins; Toronto Maple Leafs; Philadelphia Flyers
- Playing career: 1946–1969

Allan Herbert Stanley (March 1, 1926 – October 18, 2013) was a Canadian professional ice hockey defenceman who played for the New York Rangers, Chicago Blackhawks, Boston Bruins, Philadelphia Flyers and Toronto Maple Leafs of the National Hockey League (NHL) between 1948 and 1969. A four-time Stanley Cup winner and three-time member of the second NHL All-Star team, Stanley was inducted to the Hockey Hall of Fame in 1981.

== Playing career ==
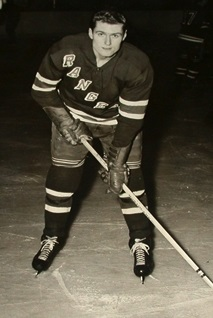
Allan Stanley

Stanley spent the 1943 through 1948 seasons with various teams including the Boston Olympics of the EHL, Porcupine Combines of the NOHA and the Providence Reds of the AHL. He finally began his storied NHL career in 1948–49 with the New York Rangers after he was acquired by the Rangers from the Reds for roughly $70,000.

He played five unhappy years in New York, where fans found displeasure in his play to the point they would call him a "bum" and later nicknamed him "Sonja" in reference to Sonja Henie, a figure skating star who often did ice shows at the Garden. He then spent the 1953–54 season in the WHL with Vancouver. Stanley started his 1954–55 season in New York with the Rangers and was soon traded to the Chicago Black Hawks where he finished that season and the next.

Stanley spent the 1956–57 and 1957–58 season with the Boston Bruins then went on to spend ten years with the Toronto Maple Leafs, where he would be named one of the team's alternate captains. He acquired the nicknames "Snowshoes" and "Silent Sam" for his slow, plodding skating style, although he was a strong stay-at-home defender and an important part of the Leafs teams which won four Stanley Cups in six years in the 1960s in 1962, 1963, 1964, 1967.

After the 1967 Cup win, Stanley finished off his career playing for the Philadelphia Flyers in 1968–69.

In 1,244 NHL regular-season games, Stanley scored 100 goals and had 333 assists for a total of 433 points. He had a total of 792 minutes in the penalty box. He was inducted into the Hockey Hall of Fame in 1981.

== Awards and achievements ==
- Named to the NHL second All-Star team in 1960, 1961, and 1966
- Won the Stanley Cup in 1962, 1963, 1964, and 1967
- In the 2009 book 100 Ranger Greats, was ranked No. 60 all-time of the 901 New York Rangers who had played during the team's first 82 seasons

== Career statistics ==
=== Regular season and playoffs ===
			Regular season					Playoffs
Season	Team	League	GP	G	A	Pts	PIM	GP	G	A	Pts	PIM
1945–46	Boston Olympics	EHL	30	8	15	23	35	—	—	—	—	—
1946–47	Providence Reds	AHL	54	8	13	21	32	—	—	—	—	—
1947–48	Providence Reds	AHL	68	9	32	41	81	5	0	0	0	4
1947–48	Boston Olympics	QSHL	1	0	0	0	0	—	—	—	—	—
1948–49	Providence Reds	AHL	23	7	16	23	24	—	—	—	—	—
1948–49	New York Rangers	NHL	40	2	8	10	22	—	—	—	—	—
1949–50	New York Rangers	NHL	55	4	4	8	58	12	2	5	7	10
1950–51	New York Rangers	NHL	70	7	14	21	75	—	—	—	—	—
1951–52	New York Rangers	NHL	50	5	14	19	52	—	—	—	—	—
1952–53	New York Rangers	NHL	70	5	12	17	52	—	—	—	—	—
1953–54	Vancouver Canucks	WHL	47	6	30	36	43	13	2	5	7	10
1953–54	New York Rangers	NHL	10	0	2	2	11	—	—	—	—	—
1954–55	New York Rangers	NHL	12	0	1	1	2	—	—	—	—	—
1954–55	Chicago Black Hawks	NHL	52	10	15	25	22	—	—	—	—	—
1955–56	Chicago Black Hawks	NHL	59	4	14	18	70	—	—	—	—	—
1956–57	Boston Bruins	NHL	60	6	25	31	45	—	—	—	—	—
1957–58	Boston Bruins	NHL	69	6	25	31	37	12	1	3	4	6
1958–59	Toronto Maple Leafs	NHL	70	1	22	23	47	12	0	3	3	2
1959–60	Toronto Maple Leafs	NHL	64	10	23	33	22	10	2	3	5	2
1960–61	Toronto Maple Leafs	NHL	68	9	25	34	42	5	0	3	3	0
1961–62	Toronto Maple Leafs	NHL	60	9	26	35	24	12	0	3	3	6
1962–63	Toronto Maple Leafs	NHL	61	4	15	19	22	10	1	6	7	8
1963–64	Toronto Maple Leafs	NHL	70	6	21	27	60	14	1	6	7	20
1964–65	Toronto Maple Leafs	NHL	64	2	15	17	30	6	0	1	1	12
1965–66	Toronto Maple Leafs	NHL	59	4	14	18	35	1	0	0	0	0
1966–67	Toronto Maple Leafs	NHL	53	1	12	13	20	12	0	2	2	10
1967–68	Toronto Maple Leafs	NHL	64	1	13	14	16	—	—	—	—	—
1968–69	Philadelphia Flyers	NHL	64	4	13	17	28	3	0	1	1	4
NHL totals			1,244	100	333	433	792	109	6	33	39	100

== Personal life ==
With his wife Barbara, the Stanleys started Bee Hive Hockey School Complex, a hockey camp for youths in Ontario. On October 18, 2013, while residing at Specialty Care Case Manor, Stanley was found dead in his home in Bobcaygeon, Ontario.

== See also ==
- List of NHL players with 1,000 games played

Sporting positions
Preceded by Frank Eddolls	New York Rangers captain 1951–53	Succeeded by Don Raleigh
