= 1962–63 Detroit Red Wings season =

Sports season

1962–63 Detroit Red Wings
- League: 4th NHL
- 1962–63 record: 32–25–13
- Home record: 19–10–6
- Road record: 13–15–7
- Goals for: 200
- Goals against: 194

Team information
- General manager: Sid Abel
- Coach: Sid Abel
- Captain: Alex Delvecchio
- Alternate captains: Marcel Pronovost
- Arena: Detroit Olympia

Team leaders
- Goals: Gordie Howe (38)
- Assists: Gordie Howe (48)
- Points: Gordie Howe (86)
- Penalty minutes: Howie Young (273)
- Wins: Terry Sawchuk (22)
- Goals against average: Terry Sawchuk (2.55)

The 1962–63 Detroit Red Wings season was the Red Wings' 37th season. They finished in fourth place in the National Hockey League (NHL) with a record of 32 wins, 25 losses, and 13 ties. Detroit defeated the Chicago Black Hawks four games to two in the semi-finals, but lost the Stanley Cup Final to the Toronto Maple Leafs, four games to one.

This season saw right winger Gordie Howe capture the Art Ross Trophy as the league's leading scorer. He potted 38 goals and added 48 assists for 86 points. Howe was also named winner of the Hart Memorial Trophy as the NHL's most valuable player, his sixth overall.

== Regular season ==
=== Final standings ===
National Hockey League
		GP	W	L	T	GF	GA	DIFF	Pts
1	Toronto Maple Leafs	70	35	23	12	221	180	+41	82
2	Chicago Black Hawks	70	32	21	17	194	178	+16	81
3	Montreal Canadiens	70	28	19	23	225	183	+42	79
4	Detroit Red Wings	70	32	25	13	200	194	+6	77
5	New York Rangers	70	22	36	12	211	233	−22	56
6	Boston Bruins	70	14	39	17	198	281	−83	45

=== Record vs. opponents ===
1962–63 NHL Records
Team	BOS	CHI	DET	MTL	NYR	TOR
Boston	—	2–10–2	2–7–5	2–7–5	4–7–3	4–8–2
Chicago	10–2–2	—	5–6–3	3–7–4	10–2–2	4–7–3
Detroit	7–2–5	6–5–3	—	3–9–2	9–3–2	7–6–1
Montreal	7–2–5	7–3–4	9–3–2	—	5–5–4	3–6–5
New York	7–4–3	2–10–2	3–9–2	5–5–4	—	5–8–1
Toronto	8–4–2	7–4–3	6–7–1	6–3–5	8–5–1	—

== Schedule and results ==
1962–63 regular season
October: 5–0–2 (home: 4–0–0; road: 1–0–2)

Game	Result	Date	Score	Opponent	Record
1	W	October 11, 1962	2–1	@ New York Rangers (1962–63)	1–0–0
2	T	October 13, 1962	0–0	@ Chicago Black Hawks (1962–63)	1–0–1
3	W	October 14, 1962	3–1	Montreal Canadiens (1962–63)	2–0–1
4	W	October 18, 1962	5–3	Boston Bruins (1962–63)	3–0–1
5	W	October 21, 1962	3–1	Chicago Black Hawks (1962–63)	4–0–1
6	T	October 25, 1962	3–3	@ Boston Bruins (1962–63)	4–0–2
7	W	October 28, 1962	2–0	Toronto Maple Leafs (1962–63)	5–0–2

November: 6–5–2 (home: 3–2–0; road: 3–3–2)

Game	Result	Date	Score	Opponent	Record
8	W	November 1, 1962	4–0	New York Rangers (1962–63)	6–0–2
9	W	November 3, 1962	7–3	@ Toronto Maple Leafs (1962–63)	7–0–2
10	W	November 4, 1962	3–1	Chicago Black Hawks (1962–63)	8–0–2
11	L	November 8, 1962	1–4	@ Montreal Canadiens (1962–63)	8–1–2
12	T	November 10, 1962	3–3	@ Boston Bruins (1962–63)	8–1–3
13	W	November 11, 1962	3–2	@ New York Rangers (1962–63)	9–1–3
14	L	November 14, 1962	2–4	@ Chicago Black Hawks (1962–63)	9–2–3
15	L	November 17, 1962	2–3	@ Toronto Maple Leafs (1962–63)	9–3–3
16	W	November 18, 1962	3–1	@ Boston Bruins (1962–63)	10–3–3
17	L	November 22, 1962	0–3	Montreal Canadiens (1962–63)	10–4–3
18	T	November 24, 1962	1–1	@ Chicago Black Hawks (1962–63)	10–4–4
19	W	November 25, 1962	3–2	Chicago Black Hawks (1962–63)	11–4–4
20	L	November 29, 1962	0–5	New York Rangers (1962–63)	11–5–4

December: 5–6–3 (home: 5–2–2; road: 0–4–1)

Game	Result	Date	Score	Opponent	Record
21	L	December 2, 1962	1–3	Toronto Maple Leafs (1962–63)	11–6–4
22	T	December 5, 1962	3–3	@ New York Rangers (1962–63)	11–6–5
23	W	December 6, 1962	5–3	Boston Bruins (1962–63)	12–6–5
24	L	December 8, 1962	1–2	@ Montreal Canadiens (1962–63)	12–7–5
25	W	December 9, 1962	4–3	Toronto Maple Leafs (1962–63)	13–7–5
26	W	December 13, 1962	3–2	New York Rangers (1962–63)	14–7–5
27	W	December 15, 1962	3–1	Chicago Black Hawks (1962–63)	15–7–5
28	L	December 16, 1962	2–5	@ New York Rangers (1962–63)	15–8–5
29	L	December 20, 1962	3–5	Boston Bruins (1962–63)	15–9–5
30	T	December 23, 1962	2–2	Montreal Canadiens (1962–63)	15–9–6
31	W	December 25, 1962	2–1	Toronto Maple Leafs (1962–63)	16–9–6
32	L	December 26, 1962	4–5	@ Toronto Maple Leafs (1962–63)	16–10–6
33	L	December 29, 1962	1–5	@ Montreal Canadiens (1962–63)	16–11–6
34	T	December 31, 1962	1–1	New York Rangers (1962–63)	16–11–7

January: 5–4–3 (home: 2–1–3; road: 3–3–0)

Game	Result	Date	Score	Opponent	Record
35	L	January 1, 1963	2–4	@ Chicago Black Hawks (1962–63)	16–12–7
36	T	January 6, 1963	5–5	Boston Bruins (1962–63)	16–12–8
37	W	January 10, 1963	3–2	@ Montreal Canadiens (1962–63)	17–12–8
38	L	January 12, 1963	1–2	@ Toronto Maple Leafs (1962–63)	17–13–8
39	W	January 13, 1963	4–2	New York Rangers (1962–63)	18–13–8
40	W	January 17, 1963	5–3	Boston Bruins (1962–63)	19–13–8
41	L	January 19, 1963	1–5	@ Montreal Canadiens (1962–63)	19–14–8
42	T	January 20, 1963	2–2	Toronto Maple Leafs (1962–63)	19–14–9
43	T	January 24, 1963	1–1	Montreal Canadiens (1962–63)	19–14–10
44	L	January 26, 1963	0–3	Chicago Black Hawks (1962–63)	19–15–10
45	W	January 27, 1963	5–3	@ Boston Bruins (1962–63)	20–15–10
46	W	January 30, 1963	6–1	@ New York Rangers (1962–63)	21–15–10

February: 3–7–3 (home: 2–4–1; road: 1–3–2)

Game	Result	Date	Score	Opponent	Record
47	T	February 2, 1963	4–4	@ Boston Bruins (1962–63)	21–15–11
48	L	February 3, 1963	2–6	Montreal Canadiens (1962–63)	21–16–11
49	T	February 6, 1963	3–3	@ Chicago Black Hawks (1962–63)	21–16–12
50	T	February 7, 1963	3–3	Boston Bruins (1962–63)	21–16–13
51	W	February 10, 1963	2–1	Toronto Maple Leafs (1962–63)	22–16–13
52	L	February 13, 1963	2–6	@ Toronto Maple Leafs (1962–63)	22–17–13
53	W	February 16, 1963	3–1	Boston Bruins (1962–63)	23–17–13
54	L	February 17, 1963	1–6	Montreal Canadiens (1962–63)	23–18–13
55	L	February 21, 1963	3–5	Chicago Black Hawks (1962–63)	23–19–13
56	L	February 23, 1963	2–3	@ Chicago Black Hawks (1962–63)	23–20–13
57	W	February 24, 1963	3–2	@ New York Rangers (1962–63)	24–20–13
58	L	February 26, 1963	3–4	New York Rangers (1962–63)	24–21–13
59	L	February 28, 1963	3–5	@ Boston Bruins (1962–63)	24–22–13

March: 8–3–0 (home: 3–1–0; road: 5–2–0)

Game	Result	Date	Score	Opponent	Record
60	W	March 2, 1963	7–1	@ Montreal Canadiens (1962–63)	25–22–13
61	W	March 3, 1963	3–2	@ New York Rangers (1962–63)	26–22–13
62	L	March 5, 1963	3–4	Montreal Canadiens (1962–63)	26–23–13
63	L	March 9, 1963	3–5	@ Toronto Maple Leafs (1962–63)	26–24–13
64	W	March 10, 1963	4–3	@ Boston Bruins (1962–63)	27–24–13
65	W	March 14, 1963	9–4	New York Rangers (1962–63)	28–24–13
66	L	March 16, 1963	3–5	@ Montreal Canadiens (1962–63)	28–25–13
67	W	March 17, 1963	4–2	Chicago Black Hawks (1962–63)	29–25–13
68	W	March 19, 1963	5–1	@ Chicago Black Hawks (1962–63)	30–25–13
69	W	March 23, 1963	2–1	@ Toronto Maple Leafs (1962–63)	31–25–13
70	W	March 24, 1963	3–2	Toronto Maple Leafs (1962–63)	32–25–13

Legend: Win (2 points) Loss (0 points) Tie (1 point)

== Playoffs ==
1963 Stanley Cup playoffs
Semifinals vs. (2) Chicago Black Hawks: Red Wings win 4–2

Game	Result	Date	Score	OT	Opponent	Series
1	L	March 26, 1963	4–5		@ Chicago Black Hawks (1962–63)	0–1
2	L	March 28, 1963	2–5		@ Chicago Black Hawks (1962–63)	0–2
3	W	March 31, 1963	4–2		Chicago Black Hawks (1962–63)	1–2
4	W	April 2, 1963	4–1		Chicago Black Hawks (1962–63)	2–2
5	W	April 4, 1963	4–2		@ Chicago Black Hawks (1962–63)	3–2
6	W	April 7, 1963	7–4		Chicago Black Hawks (1962–63)	4–2

Stanley Cup Finals vs. (1) Toronto Maple Leafs: Maple Leafs win 4–1

Game	Result	Date	Score	OT	Opponent	Series
1	L	April 9, 1963	2–4		@ Toronto Maple Leafs (1962–63)	0–1
2	L	April 11, 1963	2–4		@ Toronto Maple Leafs (1962–63)	0–2
3	W	April 14, 1963	3–2		Toronto Maple Leafs (1962–63)	1–2
4	L	April 16, 1963	2–4		Toronto Maple Leafs (1962–63)	1–3
5	L	April 18, 1963	1–3		@ Toronto Maple Leafs (1962–63)	1–4

Legend: Win Loss Tie

== Player statistics ==
=== Regular season ===
Scoring

Player	Pos	GP	G	A	Pts	PIM
Gordie Howe	RW	70	38	48	86	100
Alex Delvecchio	C/LW	70	20	44	64	8
Parker MacDonald	C	69	33	28	61	32
Norm Ullman	C	70	26	30	56	53
Bill Gadsby	D	70	4	24	28	116
Doug Barkley	D	70	3	24	27	78
Floyd Smith	RW	51	9	17	26	10
Bruce MacGregor	C	67	11	11	22	12
Alex Faulkner	C	70	10	10	20	6
Val Fonteyne	LW	67	6	14	20	2
Andre Pronovost	LW	47	13	5	18	18
Vic Stasiuk	LW	36	6	11	17	37
Larry Jeffrey	LW	53	5	11	16	62
Marcel Pronovost	D	69	4	9	13	48
Billy McNeill	RW	42	3	7	10	12
Eddie Joyal	C	14	2	8	10	0
Howie Young	D/RW	64	4	5	9	273
Pete Goegan	D	62	1	8	9	48
Lowell MacDonald	LW	26	2	1	3	8
Hank Bassen	G	16	0	1	1	14
Ron Harris	D	1	0	1	1	0
Bo Elik	LW	3	0	0	0	0
Paul Henderson	RW	2	0	0	0	9
Allan Johnson	RW/C	2	0	0	0	0
Roger Lafreniere	LW	3	0	0	0	4
Dave Lucas	D	1	0	0	0	0
Lou Marcon	D	1	0	0	0	0
Gerry Odrowski	D	1	0	0	0	0
Dennis Riggin	G	9	0	0	0	0
Terry Sawchuk	G	48	0	0	0	14

Goaltending

Player	MIN	GP	W	L	T	GA	GAA	SO
Terry Sawchuk	2781	48	22	16	7	118	2.55	3
Hank Bassen	960	16	6	5	5	51	3.19	0
Dennis Riggin	459	9	4	4	1	22	2.88	0
Team:	4200	70	32	25	13	191	2.73	3

=== Playoffs ===
Scoring

Player	Pos	GP	G	A	Pts	PIM
Gordie Howe	RW	11	7	9	16	22
Norm Ullman	C	11	4	12	16	14
Alex Delvecchio	C/LW	11	3	6	9	2
Larry Jeffrey	LW	9	3	3	6	8
Alex Faulkner	C	8	5	0	5	2
Parker MacDonald	C	11	3	2	5	2
Floyd Smith	RW	11	2	3	5	4
Bill Gadsby	D	11	1	4	5	36
Bruce MacGregor	C	10	1	4	5	10
Andre Pronovost	LW	11	1	4	5	6
Marcel Pronovost	D	11	1	4	5	8
Vic Stasiuk	LW	11	3	0	3	4
Doug Barkley	D	11	0	3	3	16
Pete Goegan	D	11	0	2	2	12
Howie Young	D/RW	8	0	2	2	16
Eddie Joyal	C	11	1	0	1	2
Bob Dillabough	C	1	0	0	0	0
Val Fonteyne	LW	11	0	0	0	2
Lowell MacDonald	LW	1	0	0	0	2
Gerry Odrowski	D	2	0	0	0	2
Terry Sawchuk	G	11	0	0	0	0

Goaltending

Player	MIN	GP	W	L	GA	GAA	SO
Terry Sawchuk	660	11	5	6	35	3.18	0
Team:	660	11	5	6	35	3.18	0

Note: GP = Games played; G = Goals; A = Assists; Pts = Points; +/- = Plus-minus PIM = Penalty minutes; PPG = Power-play goals; SHG = Short-handed goals; GWG = Game-winning goals;
MIN = Minutes played; W = Wins; L = Losses; T = Ties; GA = Goals against; GAA = Goals-against average; SO = Shutouts;

== Awards and honors ==
- Art Ross Trophy: Gordie Howe
- Hart Memorial Trophy: Gordie Howe
- Gordie Howe, Right Wing, NHL First Team All-Star
- Terry Sawchuk, Goaltender, NHL Second Team All-Star
