= Doug Barkley =

Canadian ice hockey player

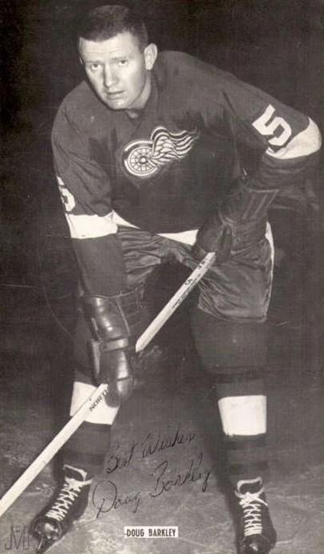
- Born: January 6, 1937 (age 89) Lethbridge, Alberta, Canada
- Height: 6 ft 2 in (188 cm)
- Weight: 185 lb (84 kg; 13 st 3 lb)
- Position: Defence
- Shot: Right
- Played for: Chicago Black Hawks; Detroit Red Wings
- Playing career: 1956–1966

Norman Douglas Barkley (born January 6, 1937) is a Canadian former professional ice hockey defenceman. He played in the National Hockey League with the Chicago Black Hawks and Detroit Red Wings between 1957 and 1966. After his playing career, he was the head coach of the Red Wings from 1970 to 1971 and again between 1975 and 1976. From 1980 to 2001 he worked as the color commentator for the Calgary Flames.

== Playing career ==
Barkley's playing career ended from an on-ice accident that rendered him blind in his right eye. On January 30, 1966, Barkley, playing for the Detroit Red Wings, was battling with Chicago's Doug Mohns for a puck at the blue line. Mohns attempted to lift Barkley's stick, but missed, and struck the bent-over Barkley directly in his right eye. Barkley would never play again. In 253 NHL games Barkley recorded 24 goals and 80 assists for 104 career points.

== Coaching career ==
Following his career-ending injury, Barkley joined the Detroit front office, working in public relations and as a troubleshooter. In 1969 he was appointed head coach of the Fort Worth Wings of the Central Hockey League (Detroit's top farm team), and on January 10, 1971, Barkley was promoted to head coach of the Detroit Red Wings. He coached less than one year before decididing to resign eleven games (where they went 3-8-0) into the 1971–72 season due to not being able to handle the "pressure" from fans and commentators. He was replaced by Johnny Wilson. Barkley returned to coach the Wings again in 1975, but lasted just 26 games before being fired and replaced by Alex Delvecchio, a former teammate.

Barkley now lives in Calgary, Alberta.

== Broadcast career ==
From 1980-2001, Barkley joined Calgary Flames play-by-play man Peter Maher in the radio broadcast booth as a colour commentator.

== Career statistics ==
=== Regular season and playoffs ===
| | | | Regular season | | | | | Playoffs |
| Season | Team | League | GP | G | A | Pts | PIM | GP | G | A | Pts | PIM |
|---|---|---|---|---|---|---|---|---|---|---|---|---|
| 1955–56 | Medicine Hat Tigers | WCJHL | 44 | 19 | 10 | 29 | 85 | 5 | 0 | 2 | 2 | 0 |
| 1956–57 | Calgary Stampeders | WHL | 63 | 4 | 8 | 12 | 112 | 3 | 0 | 0 | 0 | 0 |
| 1957–58 | Chicago Black Hawks | NHL | 3 | 0 | 0 | 0 | 0 | — | — | — | — | — |
| 1957–58 | Calgary Stampeders | WHL | 31 | 3 | 5 | 8 | 72 | 14 | 2 | 1 | 3 | 37 |
| 1957–58 | Buffalo Bisons | AHL | 27 | 0 | 3 | 3 | 22 | — | — | — | — | — |
| 1958–59 | Buffalo Bisons | AHL | 55 | 2 | 5 | 7 | 59 | 8 | 0 | 0 | 0 | 12 |
| 1959–60 | Chicago Black Hawks | NHL | 3 | 0 | 0 | 0 | 2 | — | — | — | — | — |
| 1959–60 | Calgary Stampeders | WHL | 55 | 7 | 18 | 25 | 82 | — | — | — | — | — |
| 1960–61 | Buffalo Bisons | AHL | 66 | 9 | 28 | 37 | 106 | 4 | 0 | 1 | 1 | 10 |
| 1961–62 | Calgary Stampeders | WHL | 70 | 25 | 49 | 74 | 82 | 7 | 2 | 3 | 5 | 17 |
| 1962–63 | Detroit Red Wings | NHL | 70 | 3 | 24 | 27 | 78 | 11 | 0 | 3 | 3 | 16 |
| 1963–64 | Detroit Red Wings | NHL | 67 | 11 | 21 | 32 | 115 | 14 | 0 | 5 | 5 | 33 |
| 1964–65 | Detroit Red Wings | NHL | 67 | 5 | 20 | 25 | 122 | 5 | 0 | 1 | 1 | 14 |
| 1965–66 | Detroit Red Wings | NHL | 43 | 5 | 15 | 20 | 65 | — | — | — | — | — |
| NHL totals | | | 253 | 24 | 80 | 104 | 382 | 30 | 0 | 9 | 9 | 63 |

== NHL coaching record ==
| Team | Year | Regular season | | | | | | Postseason |
| Team | Year | G | W | L | T | Pts | Finish | Result |
|---|---|---|---|---|---|---|---|---|
| Detroit Red Wings | 1970–71 | 40 | 10 | 37 | 7 | 27 | 6th in East | Missed playoffs |
| Detroit Red Wings | 1971–72 | 11 | 3 | 8 | 0 | 6 | 5th in East | Resigned |
| Detroit Red Wings | 1975–76 | 26 | 7 | 15 | 4 | 18 | 4th in Norris | Fired |
| NHL totals | | 77 | 20 | 60 | 11 | | | |

| Preceded by Ned Harkness | Head coach of the Detroit Red Wings; 1971 | Succeeded by Johnny Wilson |
| Preceded by Alex Delvecchio | Head coach of the Detroit Red Wings; 1975–1976 | Succeeded by Alex Delvecchio |
