= Moose Lallo =

Canadian ice hockey player and coach (1924–2020)

- Born: September 25, 1924 Montreal, Quebec, Canada
- Died: September 1, 2020 (aged 95) Pompano Beach, Florida, United States
- Height: 5 ft 10 in (178 cm)
- Weight: 200 lb (91 kg; 14 st 4 lb)
- Position: Defenceman
- Shot: Right
- Played for: Grand Rapids Rockets; Huntington Hornets; Muskegon Zephyrs
- Playing career: 1944–1965

Morris G. "Moose" Lallo (also known as Maurice; September 25, 1924 – September 1, 2020), was a Canadian ice hockey player, coach, and general manager. He played more than 1000 professional games during 19 seasons in the minor leagues. He played on five championship teams, and was named a first-team all-star in both the International Hockey League and the Eastern Hockey League.

Lallo became a player-coach in 1960, then later became a full-time head coach and general manager which lasted for 24 seasons. During his first 17 seasons of coaching with the Muskegon Zephyrs and Muskegon Mohawks, his teams won the Fred A. Huber Trophy seven times as regular season champions, made the playoffs 13 times, and won the Turner Cup twice. He coached another seven seasons after leaving Muskegon and was named the IHL Coach of the Year five times. He later coached in the Atlantic Coast Hockey League and won two more championships in the Continental Hockey League. He achieved 823 coaching victories in 1531 games and was inducted into the Muskegon Area Sports Hall of Fame in 1993.

== Early playing career ==
Lallo was born on September 25, 1924, in Montreal, Quebec, and was also known as Maurice.

Lallo began his professional hockey career in the 1944–45 season, and was a member of the Boston Olympics team that won the Eastern Amateur Hockey League (EAHL) championship, despite not playing a game in the playoffs. The Olympics won another EAHL championship in the 1945–46 season, but Lallo played only 27 games in a shortened season, and missed out on skating in the playoffs again. After one year off, Lallo played with the San Diego Skyhawks in the Pacific Coast Hockey League (PCHL), and racked up 136 penalty minutes in just 48 games in the 1947–48 season. He won the PCHL championship with San Diego, in the 1948–49 season, his third title as a player. Lallo played one more season in San Diego, then took a year off, and began the 1951–52 season with Moncton Hawks in the Maritime Major Hockey League. After five games in Moncton, he moved to New Haven in the EAHL. Lallo scored 18 goals in two seasons in New Haven, and accrued 239 penalty minutes.

Lallo earned a spot with the Grand Rapids Rockets in the International Hockey League (IHL) for the 1953–54 IHL season. Despite playing in a higher-level league, he posted personal bests with 12 goals, 40 points, and 152 penalty minutes. In the 1954–55 IHL season, Lallo scored another personal best of 22 goals, and had a career high of 194 penalty minutes. He was voted an IHL first-team all-star for the season. He returned to Grand Rapids for the 1955–56 IHL season, scoring 15 goals, and cut down penalty minutes to 76. He was signed by the Huntington Hornets for the 1956–57 IHL season.

After four seasons in the IHL, Lallo was signed to the Washington Presidents in the Eastern Hockey League, by the same owners from his New Haven seasons. In the 1957–58 season, he played 49 games and had only 44 penalty minutes, and won his fourth playoffs championship with Washington. In the 1958–59 season, he scored a personal best 23 goals, and 55 points, earning an EHL first-team all-star award. Lallo split the 1959–60 season between Washington and Philadelphia, playing 63 games, scoring 15 goals.

== Playing style ==
Lallo was considered a colourful spirit and a rugged defenceman. He was known for delivering hard body checks, and playing old-time hockey while losing teeth. Lallo never wore shoulder pads which helped him develop a hip check while defending. He considered himself a "rough and tough hockey player, but never dirty".

== Zephyrs player-coach ==
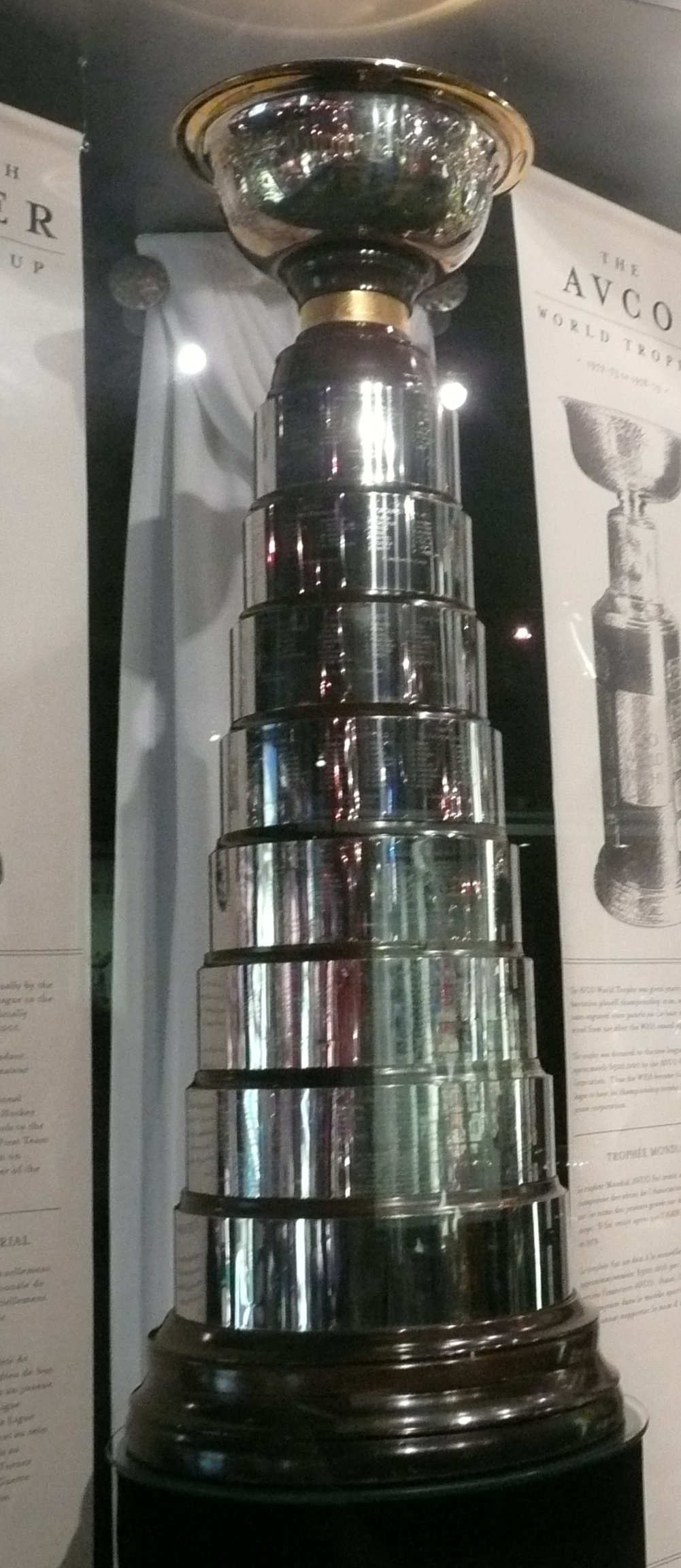
The Turner Cup was the championship trophy of the International Hockey League.

Lallo was recruited to join the International Hockey League expansion team in Muskegon, by Jerry DeLise, the same team owner who brought him to New Haven, then Washington. Lallo was also assigned the duties of player-coach of the Muskegon Zephyrs at age 36. In the 1960–61 IHL season, he played 65 games, scored 11 goals, earned 117 penalty minutes, and made the playoffs finishing third in the east. Lallo led the team through playoff upsets against the second-place Fort Wayne Komets, and the first-place Toledo Mercurys to reach the finals, but lost in five games to the St. Paul Saints.

Lallo had his best offensive career output during the 1961–62 IHL season, scoring 24 goals, and 72 points, and earned a second-team all-star honour as a defenceman. As the coach, he led the team to first place overall in the regular season, winning the Fred A. Huber Trophy with 43 wins, and 88 points. In the playoffs, Muskegon defeated the third-place Minneapolis Millers 4 games to 1, and then swept the second-place St. Paul Saints in the finals to win the Turner Cup. It was Lallo's fifth championship as a player, and the first professional championship season for any Muskegon sports team. Lallo was named a first-team all-star coach, the equivalent to coach of the year, when the Commissioner's Trophy was later introduced.

In the 1962–63 IHL season, Lallo played all 70 games, scoring 10 goals. The Zephyrs finished third place in a close race, only two points behind the first-place Fort Wayne Komets. In the playoffs, Muskegon lost in six games to the Komets. In the 1963–64 IHL season, Lallo again played all 70 games, and netted 14 goals. In another close race in the standings, Muskegon finished sixth place out the playoffs, only two points out of fourth place. Before the 1964–65 IHL season, Lallo stepped down from his coaching duties to concentrate on his final season of play, and Lorne Davis took over as player-coach. Lallo again played all 70 games, scoring 8 goals. He retired from playing at age 41, with 1086 games played.

== Mohawks head coach ==
Lallo was hired as a full-time coach and general manager for the 1965–66 IHL season, and the Zephyrs were renamed the Muskegon Mohawks. In his first season behind the bench, he led the Mohawks to 46 wins, and first place in the season, winning a second Huber Trophy. In the playoffs, Muskegon stumbled, losing in four games straight to the Port Huron Flags. After the season, Lallo received his second first-team all-star coach nomination. In the 1966–67 IHL season, Muskegon had a lot of players move on, and finished sixth place, 20 points out of the playoffs. Lallo regrouped for the 1967–68 IHL season, and returned to first place with 43 wins, 98 points, and a third Huber Trophy. In the playoffs, Muskegon defeated the third-place Columbus Checkers four games to none, and then defeated the Dayton Gems four games to one, winning the IHL championship. It was the second Turner Cup for Lallo as a coach, and he was honoured with his third coach of the year award.

In the 1968–69 IHL season, he led Muskegon to 34 wins, and a third-place finish. In the playoffs, Muskegon won all three games in round-robin play, then defeated the Toledo Blades in a five-game series, then lost in three games straight to Dayton in the finals. The league split into two divisions for the 1969–70 IHL season, and the Mohawks earned 46 wins, 100 points, won the north division, and first overall in the league, capturing a fourth Huber Trophy for Lallo. In the playoffs, Muskegon faced the south division winning Dayton Gems in a best-of-seven series, but lost in six games. Lallo received his fourth coach of the year award in 1970. In the 1970–71 IHL season, he led Muskegon to 43 wins, 91 points, and another first-place finish in the IHL, and his fifth Huber Trophy as coach. In the playoffs, the Mohawks fell in six games to sixth-place Port Huron. In the 1971–72 IHL season, Lallo achieved a third consecutive Huber Trophy, and his sixth overall, leading the Mohawks to 49 wins and 100 points. In the playoffs, he led his team past the Dayton Gems in five games, into the finals versus the Port Huron Wings, but lost in six games. The season earned Lallo his fifth coach of year award, and fourth in the last seven years.

Lallo became a part-owner of the team for the 1972–73 IHL season, and stepped back from coaching, to focus on his managing duties. Bryan McLay became the player-coach, but after 55 games, and the team struggling, Lallo returned behind the bench. In the final 29 games of the season, he led the team to 17 victories, but missed the playoffs by one point. Lallo remained as coach for the 1973–74 IHL season, and led Muskegon to 44 wins, and first in the north division. In the playoffs, they were defeated in three games by the Columbus Owls. In the 1974–75 IHL season, Lallo improved the team to 48 wins, 99 points, first overall in the IHL, and his seventh Huber Trophy. Muskegon defeated Port Huron in five games in the first round of the playoffs, but lost in seven games against the Saginaw Gears in the second round. Both Lallo, and McLay had their contracts renewed after two first-place finishes.

The 1975–76 IHL season would be Lallo's final full season coaching Muskegon. He led the Mohawks to 34 wins, 81 points, and a fourth-place finish in the north. The team fell to first-place Saginaw in five games in the first round of the playoffs. McLay retired from playing, and took over a head coach, and Lallo remained as team president and general manager. With the team struggling forty-four games into the 1976–77 IHL season, Lallo returned behind the bench with and led the team to fourth place. In the playoffs, Muskegon took first place Saginaw to seven games in the first round before the season ended. Lallo began the 1977–78 IHL season as coach, but stepped aside after 44 games in favour of McLay. With the team performing poorly, he later resigned his general manager post on March 9, 1978, ending eighteen years with the organization.

== Later coaching career ==
Lallo became head coach of the Fort Wayne Komets for the 1978–79 IHL season. He led the team to 45 wins, 96 points, and second overall in the league. In the playoffs, his team defeated the Toledo Goaldiggers in six games, but lost to the first-place Grand Rapids Owls in seven games. He returned for the 1979–80 IHL season, and his Komets finished first in the south division with 40 wins, and 93 points. In the playoffs, he led Fort Wayne past Toledo in four straight games, and Saginaw in five games. In his sixth IHL finals, Lallo and Fort Wayne lost in six games to the Kalamazoo Wings, in a bid for his third Turner Cup. The 1980–81 IHL season, was Lallo's 20th and final season in the IHL. He coached Fort Wayne to his 15th winning season with 37 wins and second place in the west division. His team defeated the Milwaukee Admirals in five games in the first round, but lost to Saginaw in five games in round two. His contract was not renewed after the season.

Lallo had initially retired after his departure from the IHL, but decided that he missed hockey enough to agree to a one-year contract with the rebranded Baltimore Skipjacks of the Atlantic Coast Hockey League. He coached his new team to 47 points in 48 games, finished third place in the 1981–82 ACHL season. His Skipjacks team almost upset the second place Mohawk Valley Stars, but lost in a close seven game series.

Lallo began the 1982–83 season with the Decatur Blues, in the semi-professional Continental Hockey League, but team folded after only five games. He was recruited by fellow Quebecker and former IHL coach Maurice Benoît, who was the general manager and coach of the Troy Sabres, and Lallo took over coaching duties of the Sabres. Lallo led the Sabres to 23 wins, in only 37 games, and the CHL championship, his third playoffs title. Troy repeated another first-place finish in the 1983–84 season, and another CHL championship, Lallo's fourth playoffs title. The Sabres were in first place during the 1984–85 season, but Lallo was fired due to financial issues.

== Later life and honours ==
Lallo was named the IHL Coach of the Year five times. He was inducted into the Muskegon Area Sports Hall of Fame in 1993. His uniform # 2 was retired in his honour in Muskegon.

Lallo died on September 1, 2020, in Pompano Beach, Florida.

== Playing statistics ==
Regular season and playoffs coaching record.

			Regular Season					Playoffs
Season	Team	League	GP	G	A	Pts	PIM	GP	G	A	Pts	PIM
1944–45	Boston Olympics	EAHL	43	3	4	7	106	–	–	–	–	–
1945–46	Boston Olympics	EAHL	27	1	7	8	53	–	–	–	–	–
1947–48	San Diego Skyhawks	PCHL	48	6	12	18	136	–	–	–	–	–
1948–49	San Diego Skyhawks	PCHL	70	8	18	26	82	5	0	0	0	0
1949–50	San Diego Skyhawks	PCHL	54	9	10	19	93	10	2	1	3	28
1951–52	Moncton Hawks	MMHL	5	2	3	5	10	–	–	–	–	–
1951–52	New Haven Tomahawks	EAHL	54	11	22	33	107	7	1	1	2	13
1952–53	New Haven Nutmegs	EAHL	53	7	27	34	132	5	1	2	3	4
1953–54	Grand Rapids Rockets	IHL	59	12	28	40	152	–	–	–	–	–
1954–55	Grand Rapids Rockets	IHL	59	22	26	48	194	4	0	0	0	8
1955–56	Grand Rapids Rockets	IHL	47	15	24	39	76	–	–	–	–	–
1956–57	Huntington Hornets	IHL	58	11	17	28	81	4	1	1	2	6
1957–58	Washington Presidents	EHL	49	9	30	39	44	13	3	4	7	18
1958–59	Washington Presidents	EHL	64	23	32	55	86	–	–	–	–	–
1959–60	Washington Presidents	EHL	45	10	16	26	79	–	–	–	–	–
1959–60	Philadelphia Ramblers	EHL	18	5	8	13	37	4	0	0	0	2
1960–61	Muskegon Zephyrs	IHL	65	11	27	38	117	13	2	4	6	32
1961–62	Muskegon Zephyrs	IHL	58	24	48	72	110	9	4	5	9	14
1962–63	Muskegon Zephyrs	IHL	70	10	41	51	128	4	0	2	2	4
1963–64	Muskegon Zephyrs	IHL	70	14	40	54	90	–	–	–	–	–
1964–65	Muskegon Zephyrs	IHL	70	8	35	43	76	–	–	–	–	–
IHL totals (9 seasons)			556	127	286	413	1024	34	7	12	19	64
EHL/EAHL totals (7 seasons)			353	69	146	215	644	29	5	7	12	37
PCHL totals (3 seasons)			172	23	40	63	311	15	2	1	3	28
MMHL totals (1 season)			5	2	3	5	10	–	–	–	–	–
Career totals (19 seasons)			1086	221	475	696	1989	78	14	20	34	129

== Coaching record ==
Regular season and playoffs coaching record.

Season	Team	League	GP	W	L	T	Pts	Pct %	Standing	Playoffs
1960–61	Muskegon Zephyrs	IHL	70	25	41	4	54	0.386	3rd, eastern	Lost in finals
1961–62	Muskegon Zephyrs	IHL	68	43	23	2	88	0.647	1st, IHL	Won championship
1962–63	Muskegon Zephyrs	IHL	70	34	31	5	73	0.521	3rd, IHL	Lost in round 1
1963–64	Muskegon Zephyrs	IHL	70	31	36	3	65	0.464	6th, IHL	Out of playoffs
1965–66	Muskegon Mohawks	IHL	70	46	19	5	97	0.693	1st, IHL	Lost in round 1
1966–67	Muskegon Mohawks	IHL	72	27	43	2	56	0.389	6th, IHL	Out of playoffs
1967–68	Muskegon Mohawks	IHL	72	43	17	12	98	0.681	1st, IHL	Won championship
1968–69	Muskegon Mohawks	IHL	72	34	29	9	77	0.535	3rd, IHL	Lost in finals
1969–70	Muskegon Mohawks	IHL	72	46	18	8	100	0.694	1st, north	Lost in round 2
1970–71	Muskegon Mohawks	IHL	72	43	24	5	91	0.632	1st, IHL	Lost in round 1
1971–72	Muskegon Mohawks	IHL	72	49	21	2	100	0.694	1st, north	Lost in finals
1972–73	Muskegon Mohawks	IHL	29	17	11	1	35	0.603	4th, north	Out of playoffs
1973–74	Muskegon Mohawks	IHL	76	44	26	6	94	0.618	1st, north	Lost in round 1
1974–75	Muskegon Mohawks	IHL	75	48	24	3	99	0.660	1st, north	Lost in round 2
1975–76	Muskegon Mohawks	IHL	78	34	31	13	81	0.519	4th, north	Lost in round 1
1976–77	Muskegon Mohawks	IHL	34	14	16	4	32	0.471	4th, north	Lost in round 1
1977–78	Muskegon Mohawks	IHL	44	17	20	7	41	0.466	5th, north	Resigned midseason
1978–79	Fort Wayne Komets	IHL	80	45	29	6	96	0.600	2nd, south	Lost in round 2
1979–80	Fort Wayne Komets	IHL	80	40	27	13	93	0.581	1st, south	Lost in finals
1980–81	Fort Wayne Komets	IHL	82	37	30	15	89	0.543	2nd, west	Lost in round 2
1981–82	Baltimore Skipjacks	ACHL	48	22	23	3	47	0.490	3rd, ACHL	Lost in round 1
1982–83	Troy Sabres	CHL	37	23	8	6	52	0.703	1st, CHL	Won championship
1983–84	Troy Sabres	CHL	48	35	10	3	73	0.760	1st, CHL	Won championship
1984–85	Troy Sabres	CHL	40	26	12	2	54	0.675	1st, CHL	Fired midseason
IHL totals (20 seasons)			1358	717	516	125	1559	0.574	9 titles	2 championships
ACHL totals (1 season)			48	22	23	3	47	0.490	—	—
CHL totals (3 seasons)			125	84	30	11	179	0.716	2 titles	2 championships
Career totals (24 seasons)			1531	823	569	139	1785	0.583	11 titles	4 championships
