= Bill LeCaine =

Canadian ice hockey player (1938–2019)

- Born: March 11, 1938 Moose Jaw, Saskatchewan, Canada
- Died: April 16, 2019 (aged 81)
- Height: 6 ft 0 in (183 cm)
- Weight: 172 lb (78 kg; 12 st 4 lb)
- Position: Left wing
- Shot: Right
- Played for: Pittsburgh Penguins
- NHL draft: Undrafted
- Playing career: 1956–1975

William Joseph LeCaine (March 11, 1938 – April 16, 2019) was an Indigenous ice hockey left winger, born on a reservation in Saskatchewan. He played 4 games for the Pittsburgh Penguins of the National Hockey League.

== Career statistics ==
=== Regular season and playoffs ===
			Regular season					Playoffs
Season	Team	League	GP	G	A	Pts	PIM	GP	G	A	Pts	PIM
1955–56	Regina Pats	WJHL	1	1	1	2	0	—	—	—	—	—
1955–56	Regina Pats	M-Cup	—	—	—	—	—	7	0	1	1	7
1956–57	Regina Pats	SJHL	48	20	22	42	21	—	—	—	—	—
1957–58	Regina Pats	SJHL	39	16	20	36	22	—	—	—	—	—
1957–58	Regina Pats	M-Cup	—	—	—	—	—	16	5	5	10	10
1958–59	University of North Dakota	NCAA	—	—	—	—	—	—	—	—	—	—
1959–60	Minneapolis Millers	IHL	56	25	32	57	62	6	1	2	3	0
1960–61	Minneapolis Millers	IHL	68	35	47	82	61	8	2	4	6	7
1961–62	Minneapolis Millers	IHL	30	7	19	26	43	—	—	—	—	—
1961–62	Indianapolis Chiefs	IHL	24	17	20	37	34	—	—	—	—	—
1961–62	Portland Buckaroos	WHL	2	0	0	0	0	—	—	—	—	—
1962–63	Port Huron Flags	IHL	61	30	43	73	93	—	—	—	—	—
1963–64	Port Huron Flags	IHL	70	28	59	87	110	7	1	2	3	42
1964–65	Port Huron Flags	IHL	66	42	59	101	151	7	5	4	9	11
1965–66	Port Huron Flags	IHL	65	41	75	116	178	9	5	8	13	29
1966–67	Port Huron Flags	IHL	39	26	38	64	162	—	—	—	—	—
1967–68	Baltimore Clippers	AHL	69	15	22	37	28	—	—	—	—	—
1968–69	Pittsburgh Penguins	NHL	4	0	0	0	0	—	—	—	—	—
1968–69	Amarillo Wranglers	CHL	51	17	22	39	68	—	—	—	—	—
1969–70	Port Huron Flags	IHL	47	25	29	54	100	14	5	8	13	8
1970–71	Port Huron Flags	IHL	68	26	30	56	74	14	2	13	15	56
1971–72	Port Huron Wings	IHL	39	15	29	44	52	14	2	5	7	38
1972–73	Port Huron Wings	IHL	60	28	38	66	63	11	3	3	6	18
1974–75	Port Huron Flags	IHL	19	3	5	8	28	—	—	—	—	—
IHL totals			712	349	523	872	1209	88	26	49	75	209
NHL totals			4	0	0	0	0	—	—	—	—	—
