= Len Fontaine =

Canadian ice hockey player (1948–2019)

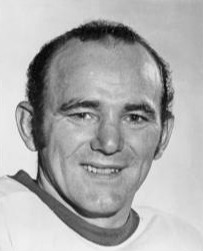
- Fontaine in 1972
- Born: February 25, 1948; Quebec City, Quebec, Canada
- Died: March 25, 2019 (aged 71); Brigden, Ontario, Canada
- Height: 5 ft 7 in (170 cm)
- Weight: 165 lb (75 kg; 11 st 11 lb)
- Position: Right wing
- Shot: Right
- Played for: Detroit Red Wings; Michigan Stags/Baltimore Blades
- Playing career: 1968–1983

Léonard Joseph Fontaine (February 25, 1948 – March 25, 2019) was a Canadian ice hockey player who played 46 games in the National Hockey League for the Detroit Red Wings during the 1972–73 and 1973–74 seasons and 21 games in the World Hockey Association for the Michigan Stags/Baltimore Blades during the 1974–75 season. The rest of his career, which lasted from 1968 to 1983, was mainly spent in the minor International Hockey League.

== Career statistics ==
=== Regular season and playoffs ===
			Regular season					Playoffs
Season	Team	League	GP	G	A	Pts	PIM	GP	G	A	Pts	PIM
1967–68	Sarnia Legionnaires	WOJBHL	—	—	—	—	—	—	—	—	—	—
1968–69	Port Huron Flags	IHL	53	15	22	37	10	3	0	1	1	2
1969–70	Port Huron Flags	IHL	69	20	29	49	16	15	3	6	9	4
1970–71	Port Huron Flags	IHL	71	29	40	69	37	14	6	6	12	2
1971–72	Port Huron Wings	IHL	70	41	45	86	54	15	7	5	12	13
1972–73	Virginia Wings	AHL	17	7	10	17	2	13	3	11	14	16
1972–73	Detroit Red Wings	NHL	39	8	10	18	6	—	—	—	—	—
1973–74	Virginia Wings	AHL	59	24	39	63	33	—	—	—	—	—
1973–74	Detroit Red Wings	NHL	7	0	1	1	4	—	—	—	—	—
1974–75	Port Huron Flags	IHL	20	19	9	28	12	5	1	1	2	0
1974–75	Michigan Stags/Baltimore Blades	WHA	21	1	8	9	6	—	—	—	—	—
1975–76	Port Huron Flags	IHL	74	53	59	112	57	15	10	9	19	20
1976–77	Port Huron Flags	IHL	61	42	37	79	51	—	—	—	—	—
1977–78	Toledo Goaldiggers	IHL	74	34	54	88	16	17	11	13	24	12
1978–79	Toledo Goaldiggers	IHL	78	29	60	89	30	6	3	3	6	0
1979–80	Toledo Goaldiggers	IHL	70	35	43	78	10	4	2	1	3	0
1980–81	Toledo Goaldiggers	IHL	16	4	6	10	0	—	—	—	—	—
1981–82	Flint Generals	IHL	62	34	47	81	12	4	0	0	0	11
1982–83	Flint Generals	IHL	71	21	37	58	10	5	0	3	3	0
WHA totals			21	1	8	9	6	—	—	—	—	—
NHL totals			46	8	11	19	10	—	—	—	—	—
