= William Chalmers (ice hockey) =

- Born: January 24, 1934 Stratford, Ontario, Canada
- Died: December 7, 1994 (aged 60) Kingston, Ontario, Canada
- Height: 6 ft 0 in (183 cm)
- Weight: 180 lb (82 kg; 12 st 12 lb)
- Position: Centre
- Shot: Left
- Played for: New York Rangers
- Playing career: 1953–1971

William Junior Chalmers (January 24, 1934 – December 7, 1994), was a Canadian professional ice hockey player who played one game in the National Hockey League with the New York Rangers during the 1953–54 season. The rest of his career, which lasted from 1953 to 1971, was mainly spent in the minor International Hockey League.

== Playing career ==
Chalmers played junior for the Guelph Biltmores, winning the Memorial Cup in 1952 as national junior ice hockey champions of Canada, and the George Richardson Memorial Trophy as eastern Canadian champions the same year.

On November 21, 1953, the 20-year-old Chalmers played one game with the NHL's New York Rangers at Maple Leaf Gardens against the Toronto Maple Leafs. This was the only NHL game of his career, earning him a spot on the list of NHL one gamers.

Beginning in 1957–58, Chalmers played the next fourteen seasons for five teams in the International Hockey League. Six of those seasons under general manager Ken Wilson, from 1960 to 1963 with the Omaha Knights and 1963 to 1966 for the Toledo Blades.

In 1982, Chalmers took over coaching duties for the Danville Dashers of the Continental Hockey League. Chick led the Dashers to a Wal-Mart Cup playoff victory in 1984.

Chalmers died on December 7, 1994.

== Career statistics ==
=== Regular season and playoffs ===
			Regular season					Playoffs
Season	Team	League	GP	G	A	Pts	PIM	GP	G	A	Pts	PIM
1951–52	Guelph Biltmores	OHA	53	11	17	28	0	11	2	2	4	2
1951–52	Guelph Biltmores	M-Cup	—	—	—	—	—	11	1	3	4	4
1952–53	Guelph Biltmores	OHA	33	13	12	25	0	—	—	—	—	—
1953–54	New York Rangers	NHL	1	0	0	0	0	—	—	—	—	—
1953–54	Guelph Biltmores	OHA	22	13	12	25	8	—	—	—	—	—
1953–54	Galt Black Hawks	OHA	39	12	14	26	20	—	—	—	—	—
1954–55	Vancouver Canucks	WHL	17	2	3	5	4	—	—	—	—	—
1954–55	Kelowna Packers	OSHL	37	14	25	39	10	4	2	1	3	2
1955–56	Chatham Maroons	OHA Sr	45	13	12	25	0	—	—	—	—	—
1955–56	Chatham Maroons	Al-Cup	—	—	—	—	—	17	5	9	14	10
1956–57	Troy Bruins	IHL	1	0	0	0	0	—	—	—	—	—
1956–57	Chatham Maroons	OHA Sr	3	0	2	2	2	—	—	—	—	—
1956–57	Sault Ste. Marie Greyhounds	NOHA	40	8	11	19	6	9	3	0	3	0
1957–58	Louisville Rebels	IHL	64	23	58	81	4	11	2	4	6	0
1958–59	Louisville Rebels	IHL	53	34	49	83	14	11	3	7	10	4
1959–60	Louisville Rebels	IHL	68	41	93	134	4	6	3	0	3	0
1960–61	Omaha Knights	IHL	70	35	69	104	15	8	2	7	9	0
1961–62	Omaha Knights	IHL	68	29	73	102	18	7	3	5	8	2
1962–63	Omaha Knights	IHL	68	28	59	87	16	7	3	5	8	2
1963–64	Toledo Blades	IHL	70	32	62	94	20	13	2	15	17	2
1964–65	Toledo Blades	IHL	64	27	63	90	12	4	5	1	6	0
1965–66	Toledo Blades	IHL	70	28	65	93	31	—	—	—	—	—
1966–67	Toledo Blades	IHL	72	34	67	101	20	10	5	8	13	8
1967–68	Toledo Blades	IHL	70	22	45	67	14	—	—	—	—	—
1968–69	Des Moines Oak Leafs	IHL	64	6	32	38	12	—	—	—	—	—
1969–70	Toledo Blades	IHL	51	18	42	60	20	3	1	0	1	2
1970–71	Toledo Hornets	IHL	35	6	14	20	12	—	—	—	—	—
1970–71	Greensboro Generals	EHL	20	2	17	19	0	9	1	3	4	2
IHL totals			888	363	791	1154	212	80	29	52	81	20
NHL totals			1	0	0	0	0	—	—	—	—	—

== Awards ==
=== Team awards ===
- 1951–1952 Memorial Cup
- 1963–1964 Turner Cup
- 1963–1964 Fred A. Huber Trophy
- 1966–1967 Turner Cup

=== Individual awards ===
- 1959–60 George H. Wilkinson Trophy
- 1959–60 IHL Second All-Star Team
- 1960–1961 IHL Second Team All-Star
- 1961–1962 IHL First All-Star Team
- 1964–1965 James Gatschene Memorial Trophy
- 1966–1967 IHL Second All-Star Team

== See also ==
- List of players who played only one game in the NHL
