= Pat Rupp =

American ice hockey player (1942–2006)

- Born: August 12, 1942 Detroit, Michigan, U.S.
- Died: February 2, 2006 (aged 63) Dayton, Ohio, U.S.
- Height: 5 ft 11 in (180 cm)
- Weight: 180 lb (82 kg; 12 st 12 lb)
- Position: Goaltender
- Caught: Left
- Played for: Detroit Red Wings
- National team: United States
- Playing career: 1963–1980

Patrick Lloyd Rupp (August 12, 1942 – February 2, 2006) was an American ice hockey goaltender. He played one game in the National Hockey League with the Detroit Red Wings during the 1963–64 season, on March 22, 1964 against the Toronto Maple Leafs. The rest of his career, which lasted from 1963 to 1980, was mainly spent in the International Hockey League. Internationally Rupp played for the American national team at the 1964 and 1968 Winter Olympics.

== Playing career ==
Rupp joined the Eastern Hockey League's Philadelphia Ramblers in 1963–64. He played one game, on March 22, 1964, in the National Hockey League, on loan with the Detroit Red Wings in 1963–64 replacing Terry Sawchuk. The Red Wings lost 4–1 to the Toronto Maple Leafs.

He was selected as a member of the US team for the 1964 Winter Olympics in Innsbruck, Austria. During the tournament, Rupp shut out East Germany in an 8–0 victory. This feat was not equalled by a US goaltender until Ray LeBlanc held Germany scoreless in the 1992 Winter Olympics. The US team finished in fifth place.

Rupp switched to the Dayton Gems in the International Hockey League in the 1964–65 season. During the next two seasons, he won the James Norris Memorial Trophy for fewer goals against with teammate John Adams.

In 1968, he was selected for his second Winter Olympics in Grenoble in France; the US team finished in sixth place.

He returned to play for the Gems until 1972 when he announced his retirement. However, he returned in 1975–76 playing for the Buffalo Norsemen in the North American Hockey League and with the Gems in 1979–80.

Later, from 1985 until 2005, Rupp continued playing recreational hockey in Dayton as a member of a local men's league, Megacity Hockey Club.

After his retirement from ice hockey, Rupp worked in the financial sector. He died of cancer in February 2006.

== Career statistics ==
=== Regular season and playoffs ===
| | | | Regular season | | | | | | | | | Playoffs |
| Season | Team | League | GP | W | L | T | MIN | GA | SO | GAA | SV% | GP | W | L | MIN | GA | SO | GAA | SV% |
|---|---|---|---|---|---|---|---|---|---|---|---|---|---|---|---|---|---|---|---|
| 1961–62 | Flin Flon Bombers | SJHL | 51 | — | — | — | 3060 | 178 | 2 | 3.49 | — | 10 | — | — | 600 | 51 | 0 | 5.10 | — |
| 1962–63 | Flin Flon Bombers | SJHL | 52 | — | — | — | 3120 | 226 | 2 | 4.34 | — | 6 | — | — | 360 | 28 | 0 | 4.67 | — |
| 1963–64 | Detroit Red Wings | NHL | 1 | 0 | 1 | 0 | 60 | 4 | 0 | 4.00 | .867 | — | — | — | — | — | — | — | — |
| 1963–64 | Philadelphia Ramblers | EHL | 38 | — | — | — | 2280 | 191 | 0 | 5.03 | .890 | — | — | — | — | — | — | — | — |
| 1964–65 | Dayton Gems | IHL | 28 | — | — | — | 1680 | 160 | 0 | 5.75 | — | — | — | — | — | — | — | — | — |
| 1964–65 | Jersey Devils | EHL | 41 | — | — | — | 2460 | 188 | 1 | 4.59 | — | — | — | — | — | — | — | — | — |
| 1965–66 | Dayton Gems | IHL | 69 | 33 | 34 | 2 | 4140 | 316 | 2 | 4.58 | — | 11 | 5 | 6 | 660 | 45 | 0 | 4.09 | — |
| 1966–67 | Dayton Gems | IHL | 71 | 44 | 24 | 3 | 4260 | 277 | 0 | 3.85 | — | 4 | 0 | 4 | 240 | 19 | 0 | 4.75 | — |
| 1968–69 | Dayton Gems | IHL | 41 | — | — | — | 2420 | 136 | 4 | 3.37 | — | 3 | — | — | 185 | 6 | 0 | 1.94 | — |
| 1969–70 | Dayton Gems | IHL | 28 | — | — | — | 1320 | 90 | 1 | 4.00 | — | 1 | 0 | 0 | 37 | 2 | 0 | 3.24 | — |
| 1970–71 | Dayton Gems | IHL | 27 | — | — | — | 1509 | 95 | 1 | 3.78 | — | 6 | — | — | 333 | 14 | 1 | 2.52 | — |
| 1971–72 | Dayton Gems | IHL | 49 | — | — | — | 2949 | 161 | 0 | 3.28 | — | 5 | 1 | 4 | 271 | 22 | 0 | 4.87 | — |
| 1975–76 | Buffalo Norsemen | NAHL | 4 | — | — | — | 148 | 13 | 0 | 5.25 | — | — | — | — | — | — | — | — | — |
| 1979–80 | Dayton Gems | IHL | 1 | 0 | 0 | 0 | 20 | 1 | 0 | 3.00 | — | — | — | — | — | — | — | — | — |
| NHL totals | | | 1 | 0 | 1 | 0 | 60 | 4 | 0 | 4.00 | .867 | — | — | — | — | — | — | — | — |

=== International ===
| Year | Team | Event | GP | W | L | T | MIN | GA | SO | GAA | SV% |
|---|---|---|---|---|---|---|---|---|---|---|---|
| 1964 | United States | OLY | 6 | 2 | 3 | 0 | 329 | 22 | 0 | 4.01 | .893 |
| 1968 | United States | OLY | 7 | 2 | 4 | 1 | 380 | 18 | 0 | 2.84 | .923 |
| Senior totals | | | 13 | 4 | 7 | 1 | 709 | 40 | 0 | 3.39 | — |

== See also ==
- List of players who played only one game in the NHL
