= Guy Trottier =

Canadian ice hockey player

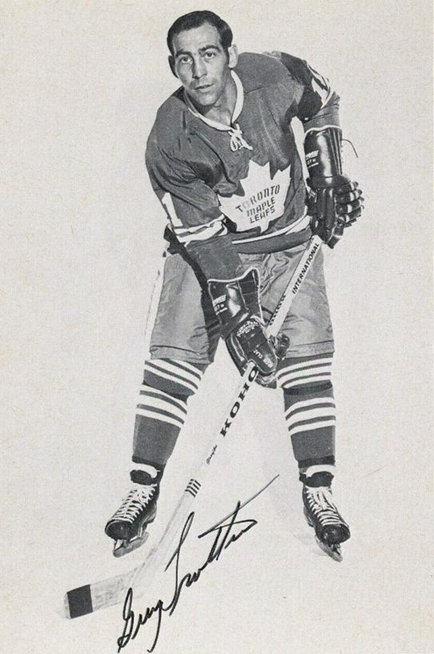
- Trottier in 1970 photo
- Born: April 1, 1941 Hull, Quebec, Canada
- Died: June 19, 2014 (aged 73) Dayton, Ohio, U.S.
- Height: 5 ft 8 in (173 cm)
- Weight: 165 lb (75 kg; 11 st 11 lb)
- Position: Right wing
- Shot: Right
- Played for: New York Rangers; Toronto Maple Leafs; Ottawa Nationals; Toronto Toros; Michigan Stags/Baltimore Blades
- Playing career: 1963–1976

Guy Albert Trottier (April 1, 1941 – June 19, 2014) was a Canadian professional ice hockey player who played 115 games in the National Hockey League and 174 games in the World Hockey Association between 1969 and 1975. He played for the New York Rangers, Toronto Maple Leafs, Ottawa Nationals, Toronto Toros, Michigan Stags and Baltimore Blades.

== Playing career ==
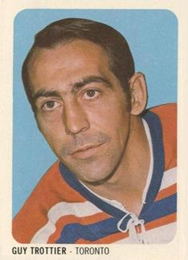
1973-74 Quaker Oats WHA card of Trottier

Trottier played junior and senior hockey in the Hull-Ottawa area before signing with the Knoxville Knights of the Eastern Hockey League in 1963. In 1963–64, Trottier was traded twice, to the Philadelphia Ramblers of the EHL and the Port Huron Flags of the International Hockey League, totaling 33 goals and 31 assists in 69 games. During the off-season, he was traded to the IHL's Dayton Gems, with whom he played the next three years. In 201 games with Dayton, he scored 185 goals and registered 170 assists. He led the IHL in playoff goals (10), assists (9), and points (19) in the 1966 Turner Cup playoffs, and led the IHL with 71 goals in 1966–67. He was a second-team IHL All-Star in 1964–65 and 1965–66, and a first-team All-Star in 1966–67.

In 1967, Trottier signed with the Buffalo Bisons of the American Hockey League. He led the AHL in goal scoring with 45 in 1968–69 and 55 in the Bisons' final season, 1969–70. In December 1968, the New York Rangers purchased his contract, and he appeared in two NHL games. In June 1970, the Maple Leafs claimed him in the Intra-League Draft. He scored 28 goals and 17 assists in 113 games with the Leafs.

In 1972, the Dayton Arrows of the WHA claimed Trottier in the league's first General Player Draft. Later that year, his rights were traded to Ottawa. He scored 26 goals with the Nationals in 1972–73 and 27 more in 1973–74, after the team moved to Toronto. In November 1974, the Toros traded him to the Michigan Stags. He finished out the season with Dayton of the IHL. After spending the 1975–76 season as playing coach of the Buffalo Norsemen of the North American Hockey League, he retired. He also coached the Hull Olympiques for part of the 1977–78 season.

== Post-playing career ==
In 2009, Trottier was hired by the Dayton Gems of the International Hockey League as director of hockey operations.

He died of cancer at a hospice in Dayton, Ohio at the age of 73 in 2014.

== Career statistics ==
=== Regular season and playoffs ===
| | | | Regular season | | | | | Playoffs |
| Season | Team | League | GP | G | A | Pts | PIM | GP | G | A | Pts | PIM |
|---|---|---|---|---|---|---|---|---|---|---|---|---|
| 1962–63 | Ottawa Montagnards | OCHL | — | — | — | — | — | — | — | — | — | — |
| 1963–64 | Knoxville Knights | EHL | 15 | 12 | 11 | 23 | 27 | — | — | — | — | — |
| 1963–64 | Philadelphia Ramblers | EHL | 12 | 2 | 5 | 7 | 11 | — | — | — | — | — |
| 1963–64 | Port Huron Flags | IHL | 42 | 19 | 15 | 34 | 52 | 7 | 1 | 0 | 1 | 2 |
| 1964–65 | Dayton Gems | IHL | 68 | 46 | 42 | 88 | 56 | — | — | — | — | — |
| 1965–66 | Dayton Gems | IHL | 66 | 68 | 64 | 132 | 16 | 11 | 10 | 9 | 19 | 21 |
| 1966–67 | Dayton Gems | IHL | 68 | 71 | 64 | 135 | 23 | 4 | 0 | 5 | 5 | 0 |
| 1967–68 | Buffalo Bisons | AHL | 41 | 16 | 19 | 35 | 6 | 4 | 2 | 4 | 6 | 2 |
| 1968–69 | New York Rangers | NHL | 2 | 0 | 0 | 0 | 0 | — | — | — | — | — |
| 1968–69 | Buffalo Bisons | AHL | 72 | 45 | 37 | 82 | 21 | 6 | 4 | 3 | 7 | 0 |
| 1969–70 | Buffalo Bisons | AHL | 71 | 55 | 33 | 88 | 8 | 9 | 6 | 2 | 8 | 9 |
| 1970–71 | Toronto Maple Leafs | NHL | 61 | 19 | 5 | 24 | 21 | 5 | 0 | 0 | 0 | 0 |
| 1971–72 | Toronto Maple Leafs | NHL | 52 | 9 | 12 | 21 | 16 | 4 | 1 | 0 | 1 | 16 |
| 1972–73 | Ottawa Nationals | WHA | 72 | 26 | 32 | 58 | 25 | 5 | 1 | 2 | 3 | 0 |
| 1973–74 | Toronto Toros | WHA | 71 | 27 | 35 | 62 | 58 | 12 | 5 | 5 | 10 | 4 |
| 1974–75 | Toronto Toros | WHA | 14 | 4 | 4 | 8 | 4 | — | — | — | — | — |
| 1974–75 | Michigan Stags/Baltimore Blades | WHA | 17 | 5 | 4 | 9 | 2 | — | — | — | — | — |
| 1974–75 | Dayton Gems | IHL | 20 | 12 | 5 | 17 | 6 | 13 | 4 | 1 | 5 | 4 |
| 1975–76 | Buffalo Norsemen | NAHL | 56 | 36 | 22 | 58 | 59 | 1 | 0 | 0 | 0 | 20 |
| WHA totals | | | 174 | 62 | 75 | 137 | 89 | 17 | 6 | 7 | 13 | 4 |
| NHL totals | | | 115 | 28 | 17 | 45 | 37 | 9 | 1 | 0 | 1 | 16 |
