= J. Bob Kelly =

Canadian ice hockey player

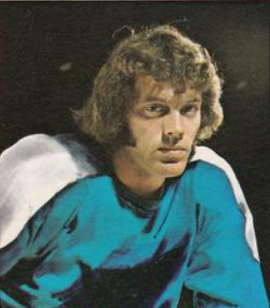
- Kelly in 1974 card
- Born: June 6, 1946 (age 79) Fort William, Ontario, Canada
- Height: 6 ft 2 in (188 cm)
- Weight: 181 lb (82 kg; 12 st 13 lb)
- Position: Left wing
- Shot: Left
- Played for: St. Louis Blues; Pittsburgh Penguins; Chicago Black Hawks
- NHL draft: 16th overall, 1967; Toronto Maple Leafs
- Playing career: 1967–1980

John Robert Kelly (born June 6, 1946) is a Canadian former professional ice hockey player who played 425 games in the National Hockey League with the St. Louis Blues, Pittsburgh Penguins, and Chicago Black Hawks between 1973 and 1979. Although official NHL records cite him as Bob Kelly, he was commonly known during his NHL career as J. Bob Kelly to differentiate himself from the Bob Kelly who played primarily with the Philadelphia Flyers at that time. Known for his size, strength and toughness, he was nicknamed "Battleship" during his playing days.

== Career statistics ==
			Regular season					Playoffs
Season	Team	League	GP	G	A	Pts	PIM	GP	G	A	Pts	PIM
1966–67	Port Arthur Marrs	TBJHL	5	0	2	2	13	—	—	—	—	—
1966–67	Port Arthur Marrs	M-Cup	—	—	—	—	—	6	3	1	4	2
1967–68	Port Huron Flags	IHL	65	11	26	37	216	—	—	—	—	—
1968–69	Port Huron Flags	IHL	59	9	15	24	55	—	—	—	—	—
1968–69	Columbus Checkers	IHL	—	—	—	—	—	3	1	1	2	2
1969–70	Providence Reds	AHL	65	2	5	7	28	—	—	—	—	—
1970–71	Providence Reds	AHL	26	1	0	1	31	—	—	—	—	—
1970–71	Des Moines Oak Leafs	IHL	24	3	14	17	58	—	—	—	—	—
1971–72	Oklahoma City Blazers	CHL	6	1	2	3	22	—	—	—	—	—
1971–72	Omaha Knights	CHL	3	2	2	4	4	—	—	—	—	—
1971–72	Des Moines Oak Leafs	IHL	55	26	23	49	123	3	0	1	1	0
1972–73	Rochester Americans	AHL	70	27	35	62	206	6	4	4	8	18
1973–74	St. Louis Blues	NHL	37	9	8	17	45	—	—	—	—	—
1973–74	Pittsburgh Penguins	NHL	30	7	10	17	78	—	—	—	—	—
1974–75	Pittsburgh Penguins	NHL	69	27	24	51	120	9	5	3	8	17
1975–76	Pittsburgh Penguins	NHL	77	25	30	55	149	3	0	0	0	2
1976–77	Pittsburgh Penguins	NHL	74	10	21	31	115	3	1	1	4
1977–78	Chicago Black Hawks	NHL	75	7	11	18	95	4	0	0	0	8
1978–79	Chicago Black Hawks	NHL	63	2	5	7	85	4	0	0	0	9
1978–79	New Brunswick Hawks	AHL	7	0	0	0	60	—	—	—	—	—
1979–80	Houston Apollos	CHL	2	0	0	0	10	—	—	—	—	—
1979–80	Cincinnati Stingers	CHL	2	0	0	0	5	—	—	—	—	—
NHL totals			425	87	109	196	687	23	6	3	9	40
