= Bob Bailey (ice hockey) =

Canadian ice hockey player (b. 1931)

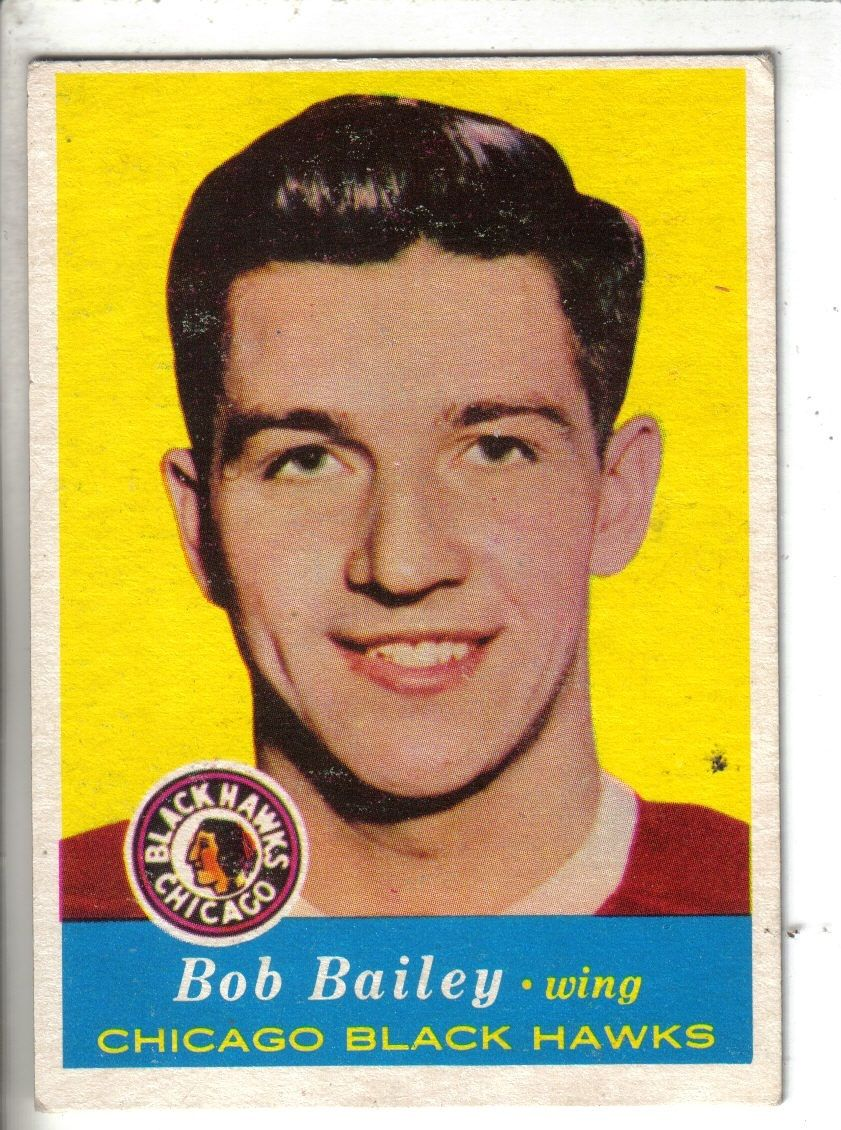
- Born: May 29, 1931; Kenora, Ontario, Canada
- Died: October 24, 2003 (aged 72); Cleveland, Ohio, U.S.
- Height: 5 ft 11 in (180 cm)
- Weight: 180 lb (82 kg; 12 st 12 lb)
- Position: Right wing
- Shot: Right
- Played for: Toronto Maple Leafs; Detroit Red Wings; Chicago Black Hawks
- Playing career: 1947–1968

Robert Allan "Bashin' Bob" Bailey (May 29, 1931 – October 24, 2003) was a Canadian ice hockey right winger. He played for the Toronto Maple Leafs, Detroit Red Wings, and Chicago Black Hawks of the National Hockey League between 1953 and 1958. The rest of his career, which lasted from 1947 to 1968, was spent in various minor leagues. During his career he was involved in trades for over twenty players, including three separate trades for Bill Dineen. He was inducted into the Dayton Hockey Hall of Fame in 1970 for his time with the Dayton Gems of the International Hockey League, where he played the last four seasons of his career.

== Professional career ==
=== Minor league hockey ===
Bailey had his first taste of professional hockey at the age of 16 when he played 22 games with the Windsor Hettche Spitfires of the International Hockey League. He performed well, but many on the coaching staff felt he needed more time to develop. He continued his play with the Stratford Kroehlers and didn't return to the IHL until the 1951–52 season, when he played in the final two games of the season for the Toledo Mercurys. However that was all it took. The Detroit Red Wings owned the rights to Bailey and decided to trade him to the Cleveland Barons along with his brother, John Bailey for the rights to Lou Jankowski and Bill Dineen in June 1951. In the American Hockey League Bailey flourished, playing in 54 games, amassing 46 points and a team-high 115 penalty minutes. That's all it took, as the Toronto Maple Leafs had had their eye on young Bailey and wanted to see what he could do. On May 30, 1953, Toronto traded Chuck Blair and 30,000 USD to Cleveland for Bailey and Gerry Foley.

=== Reaching the NHL ===
After spending a short amount of time in the Maple Leafs' farm system with the Ottawa Senators of the QHL and the Pittsburgh Hornets, Bailey made his debut with the Toronto Maple Leafs in the middle of the 1953–54 season. He played in 48 games and scored 9 points, but also joined the Leafs' short playoff run against the Detroit Red Wings. Maurice "Rocket" Richard had a short altercation with the young rookie when he butt-ended Bailey with his stick after Bailey slammed Richard into the boards. Throughout the game Richard repeatedly tried to renew his attack on Bailey and even refused to leave the ice after a slash when ordered by the referee. The following two seasons would be much less dramatic as they saw Bailey splitting time between the Maple Leafs and the Hornets, never really finding his scoring touch when brought up to the big leagues. While playing for the Hornets in 1956, Bailey was suspended from the remainder of the playoffs and fined US$575 for assaulting referee Jerry Olinski on April 2.

On May 28, 1956, Bailey was traded along with Bob Sabourin to the Springfield Indians for 11,000 USD. On September 22, 1956, Bailey was traded to the Detroit Red Wings for cash, but would remain in Springfield on loan. He played 40 games for the Indians before being called up to replace injured players for the Detroit Red Wings. He joined the Red Wings for their short playoff run against the Boston Bruins. The 1957–58 season saw Bailey playing for the Chicago Blackhawks after being acquired in the NHL Intra-League Draft on June 5, 1957. He would only play in 28 games before again being traded, this time with Jack McIntyre, Nick Mickoski and Hec Lalonde for Earl Reibel, Billy Dea, Lorne Ferguson and Bill Dineen on December 17, 1957. Bailey again joined Detroit for the playoffs and again had a post-season altercation. During the semi-finals against the Montreal Canadiens, there was a bench-clearing brawl that all started in the second period, precipitated by Bailey charging Montreal's goaltender, Jacques Plante. To settle the teams (and the crowd), referee Frank Udvari sent both teams to their dressing rooms and added the 5:22 remaining in that second period to the third stanza. The Canadiens ended up winning 2-1 and knocked Detroit out of the playoffs in four games. The 1957–58 season would be Bailey's last in the NHL.

On July 31, 1958, Bailey was again traded to Cleveland from Detroit, this time for cash. However, Bailey picked up his scoring game for the 1958–59 season and finished third on the team in scoring and first again in penalty minutes. The following season saw Bailey playing only five more games for the Barons before being traded for Bill Dineen once again, this time to the Buffalo Bisons on October 20, 1959. He would finish out the season in Buffalo at almost a point-per-game pace. In 1960, Bailey was involved in another multiplayer trade on June 7. Bailey, Glen Skov, the rights to Danny Lewicki, Terry Gray and Lorne Ferguson went to the Montreal Canadiens for Cecil Hoekstra, Reggie Fleming, Ab McDonald and Bob Courcy. However, he wouldn't see ice time with Montreal as he would spend time with Montreal's minor leagues. Bailey spent the 1960–61 season with the Quebec Aces and the start of the 1961–62 season with the Pittsburgh Hornets before again being traded. This time Bailey would be switching leagues as Pittsburgh traded him to the San Francisco Seals of the Western Hockey League for Gord Redahl on February 27, 1962.

On the Seals, Bailey failed to put up large numbers and was sent to the Philadelphia Ramblers of the Eastern Hockey League. He had his best offensive season to date with the Ramblers, scoring 26 goals for a total of 91 points during the 1962–63 season. He also helped head coach for a short time that season along with Hugh Currie and Doug Adam. In 1963 Bailey was let go, but found a home with the Fort Wayne Komets of the International Hockey League.

=== Ending on a high note ===
At the end of the 1963–64 season, Bailey was involved in his last professional trade when he was traded to the Dayton Gems for Roger Maisonneuve in November 1964.

This turned out to be a great fit as Bailey put up his best numbers ever, scoring a career-high and team-leading 132 points in the 1965–66 season. In his final season, Bailey was suspended after slugging referee Billy Purcell in a game at Fort Wayne on December 9, 1967. This is what helped convince Bailey to retire in 1968. He had spent four years with the Gems in which he scored 319 points, almost half his total amassed career points.

== After hockey ==
Bailey was honored on March 17, 1970, when he was inducted into the Dayton Hockey Hall of Fame. Long time Fort Wayne General Manager Ken Ullyot called him "the last of the great stick handlers." Gems' goaltender Pat Rupp said Bailey was "the best to ever play hockey in Dayton."

== Career statistics ==
=== Regular season and playoffs ===
			Regular season					Playoffs
Season	Team	League	GP	G	A	Pts	PIM	GP	G	A	Pts	PIM
1947–48	Windsor Hettche Spitfires	IHL	22	2	7	9	14	8	0	0	0	10
1948–49	Kenora Thistles	NOHA	14	5	10	15	51	5	2	3	5	8
1949–50	Windsor Spitfires	OHA	48	10	17	27	66	11	1	5	6	20
1950–51	Stratford Kroehlers	OHA	53	21	45	66	109	3	1	0	1	2
1951–52	Toledo Mercurys	IHL	2	0	3	3	0	—	—	—	—	—
1952–53	Cleveland Barons	AHL	54	11	35	46	115	10	2	2	4	33
1953–54	Toronto Maple Leafs	NHL	48	2	7	9	70	5	0	2	2	4
1953–54	Ottawa Senators	QSHL	2	0	0	0	12	—	—	—	—	—
1953–54	Pittsburgh Hornets	AHL	7	2	3	5	19	—	—	—	—	—
1954–55	Toronto Maple Leafs	NHL	32	4	2	6	52	1	0	0	0	0
1954–55	Pittsburgh Hornets	AHL	26	9	19	28	23	5	0	8	8	24
1955–56	Toronto Maple Leafs	NHL	6	0	0	0	6	—	—	—	—	—
1955–56	Pittsburgh Hornets	AHL	48	6	30	36	98	4	2	1	3	4
1956–57	Springfield Indians	AHL	40	11	33	44	83	—	—	—	—	—
1956–57	Detroit Red Wings	NHL	—	—	—	—	—	5	0	2	2	2
1957–58	Chicago Black Hawks	NHL	28	3	6	9	38	—	—	—	—	—
1957–58	Detroit Red Wings	NHL	35	6	6	12	41	4	0	0	0	16
1958–59	Cleveland Barons	AHL	64	28	41	69	153	7	4	3	7	16
1959–60	Cleveland Barons	AHL	5	0	3	3	13	—	—	—	—	—
1959–60	Buffalo Bisons	AHL	5	0	3	3	13	—	—	—	—	—
1960–61	Quebec Aces	AHL	38	6	11	17	91	—	—	—	—	—
1961–62	Pittsburgh Hornets	AHL	27	3	17	20	91	—	—	—	—	—
1961–62	San Francisco Seals	WHL	12	2	6	8	12	2	0	0	0	16
1962–63	San Francisco Seals	WHL	11	0	6	6	14	—	—	—	—	—
1962–63	Philadelphia Ramblers	EHL	50	26	65	91	64	3	0	3	3	10
1963–64	Philadelphia Ramblers	EHL	7	2	4	6	67	—	—	—	—	—
1963–64	Fort Wayne Komets	IHL	22	12	19	31	64	—	—	—	—	—
1964–65	Dayton Gems	IHL	54	31	56	87	102	—	—	—	—	—
1965–66	Dayton Gems	IHL	61	45	87	132	127	10	9	8	7	53
1966–67	Dayton Gems	IHL	35	13	36	49	59	4	3	1	4	8
1967–68	Dayton Gems	IHL	24	15	36	51	93	—	—	—	—	—
AHL totals			338	82	216	298	740	26	8	14	22	77
NHL totals			149	15	21	36	207	15	0	4	4	22

== Awards and achievements ==
- Most assists in a season (87) – Dayton Gems (1965–66 season)
- Dayton Hockey Hall of Fame Inductee – March 17, 1970
