= Frank St. Marseille =

Canadian ice hockey player

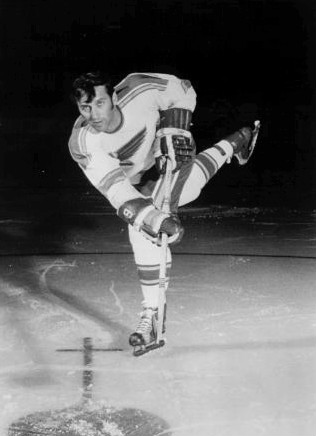
- St-Marseille with the St. Louis Blues in 1971
- Born: December 14, 1939 (age 86) Levack, Ontario, Canada
- Height: 5 ft 11 in (180 cm)
- Weight: 180 lb (82 kg; 12 st 12 lb)
- Position: Right wing
- Shot: Right
- Played for: St. Louis Blues; Los Angeles Kings
- NHL draft: Undrafted
- Playing career: 1967–1977

Joseph Francis Léo "Frank" St-Marseille (born December 14, 1939) is a Canadian former professional ice hockey right wing. He played in the National Hockey League for the St. Louis Blues and Los Angeles Kings from 1967 to 1977. St. Marseille is of Ojibwe-Métis, French-Canadian and Finnish descent. He is from Levack, which is situated in the Sudbury regional municipality in Ontario, Canada.

== Playing career ==
After not being drafted because he was considered too slow for the big leagues, St-Marseille played the early stages of his career starting with the Chatham Maroons. During the fall of 1962, he tried out with the Chatham Maroons of the Senior Ontario Hockey Association and made the team; he got 39 points. The Maroons then moved to the International Hockey League (1945–2001), and St-Marseille moved with the team. He compiled a respectable 64 points in 70 games during the 1963–1964 season. The next season Chatham Maroons (IHL) dropped out of the league and St- Marseille was picked up by the Port Huron Flags, in the IHL. St-Marseille had three impressive seasons with Port Huron between 1964 and 1967, including winning an International Hockey League playoff title, known as the Turner Cup, in 1966. He scored 97, 90, and 118 points for a total of 305 points in only 210 games.

At this point, he had worked his way through the minors and was coming off the 1967 season with Port Huron; he was named to the league's second all-star team and had been signed by the expansion team St. Louis Blues. The 1967 NHL expansion opened up a whole new world of opportunities for eager young newcomers, many of whom likely would have taken far different career paths if the league had remained a closed Original Six entity. St-Marseille began playing for a minor-league team, the Kansas City Blues, mainly as an affiliate of the St. Louis Blues. However, only 11 games in with the team, St-Marseille was called up by Scotty Bowman along with his linemates Gary Sabourin and Terry Crisp. Bowman was quoted as saying they "were better than our third line in St. Louis" referring to Frank, Gary, and Terry. Known as a defensive-minded forward, St-Marseille often played on checking lines that were assigned to play against the opponent's top scoring line. Despite this, he still averaged 16 goals per season during a 5-year stretch with St. Louis that saw the Blues reach three straight Stanley Cup finals (losing to the Montreal Canadiens twice and the Boston Bruins). He made the 1970 West Division All-Star team playing with great hockey legends such as Bobby Clarke and teammate Jacques Plante, who was the first NHL goaltender to wear a goaltender mask. From 1970 to 1972 St-Marseille captained the team. He also played on both the penalty killing and power play units for the Blues, had a plus/minus rating of +37 during those 5 years and sits tied for 6th on the all-time game-tying goals list for the Blues. In 62 playoff games with the Blues, St- Marseille tallied 19 goals and 24 assists.

Midway through the 1972–73 season, St-Marseille was traded to the Los Angeles Kings for Paul Curtis on January 27, 1973, and played the final four and a half years of his career in the NHL. St-Marseille continued his defensive forward and penalty-killing roles with the Kings, but no longer played on the power play. He scored 54 goals in his tenure with the Kings, and the club made the playoffs in each of his final four seasons with them. His best performance in Los Angeles was a 53-point performance in 1974–75. His career high came in St. Louis in 1969-70 (59 points). St-Marseille finished his hockey career in 1977-78 when he played one season in the American Hockey League for the Nova Scotia Voyageurs before retiring as a player to become the Voyageurs coach; he also spent one year as an assistant coach with the Los Angeles Kings. His NHL totals in 10 NHL seasons were 140 goals and 285 assists for 425 points in 707 games.

== Personal life ==
St-Marseille grew up in the mining town of Levack, Ontario, which is now in the City of Greater Sudbury. His father Stéphane was a violinist, his grandfather, Adélard, was a baritone and his aunt also sang. Frank's older brother Frédéric Stéphane St-Marseille died at the age of 73 from congestive heart failure; he performed all over the world with major opera companies. While St-Marseille would become a professional hockey player, he left the game of hockey when he decided to move back to Canada to help his sons Rob St-Marseille and Chris St-Marseille develop as a hockey player. Rob was drafted in 1982 by Kingston of the Ontario Hockey League, He also played at Lake Superior State University. He now is a constable for the Sudbury detachment of the Ontario Provincial Police. Chris played junior hockey for the Rayside Balfour Canadians (NOJHL) and tried out for the North Bay Cententials (OHL). Chris has two sons, Ben and Alex, who both played junior hockey. Frank's daughter Lizanne has a son, Joe Ranger, who currently plays in goal for the Sudbury Wolves (OHL).

In 1988, a Hall of Fame was established in Valley East, and St-Marseille and Ron Duguay were the first athletic members to be inducted. Frank's career has been celebrated with a Major Peewee Championship being named after him in the Nickel District Minor Hockey League.

== Career statistics ==
=== Regular season and playoffs ===
			Regular season					Playoffs
Season	Team	League	GP	G	A	Pts	PIM	GP	G	A	Pts	PIM
1960–61	Levack Huskies	NOHA	—	—	—	—	—	—	—	—	—	—
1961–62	Levack Huskies	NOHA	—	—	—	—	—	—	—	—	—	—
1961–62	New Haven Blades	EHL	3	0	0	0	9	—	—	—	—	—
1962–63	Sudbury Wolves	EPHL	3	0	2	2	0	—	—	—	—	—
1962–63	Chatham Maroons	OHA Sr	45	17	22	39	49	10	4	1	5	4
1963–64	Chatham Maroons	IHL	70	31	33	64	21	—	—	—	—	—
1964–65	Port Huron Flags	IHL	70	38	59	97	57	7	2	5	7	24
1965–66	Port Huron Flags	IHL	68	45	45	90	28	9	6	6	12	12
1966–67	Port Huron Flags	IHL	72	41	77	118	46	—	—	—	—	—
1967–68	St. Louis Blues	NHL	57	16	16	32	12	18	5	8	13	0
1967–68	Kansas City Blues	CPHL	11	7	8	15	0	—	—	—	—	—
1968–69	St. Louis Blues	NHL	72	12	26	38	22	12	3	3	6	2
1969–70	St. Louis Blues	NHL	74	16	43	59	18	15	6	7	13	4
1970–71	St. Louis Blues	NHL	77	19	32	51	26	6	2	1	3	4
1971–72	St. Louis Blues	NHL	78	16	36	52	32	11	3	5	8	6
1972–73	St. Louis Blues	NHL	45	7	18	25	8	—	—	—	—	—
1972–73	Los Angeles Kings	NHL	29	7	4	11	2	—	—	—	—	—
1973–74	Los Angeles Kings	NHL	78	14	36	50	40	5	0	0	0	0
1974–75	Los Angeles Kings	NHL	80	17	36	53	46	3	0	1	1	0
1975–76	Los Angeles Kings	NHL	68	10	16	26	20	9	0	0	0	0
1976–77	Los Angeles Kings	NHL	49	6	22	28	16	9	1	0	1	2
1976–77	Fort Worth Texans	CHL	16	6	12	18	4	—	—	—	—	—
1977–78	Nova Scotia Voyageurs	AHL	74	14	14	28	38	11	3	2	5	0
NHL totals			707	140	285	425	242	88	20	25	45	18

=== Coaching Record ===
			Regular season					Playoffs
Season	Team	League	Games Coached	W	L	T	Win percentage	Results
1977–78	Nova Scotia Voyageurs	AHL	81	37	28	16	0.556	Lost in round 2
1978–79	Nova Scotia Voyageurs	AHL	80	39	37	4	0.513	Lost in round 2
AHL totals			161	76	65	20	—	—
