= Hugh Harris (ice hockey) =

Canadian ice hockey player (born 1948)

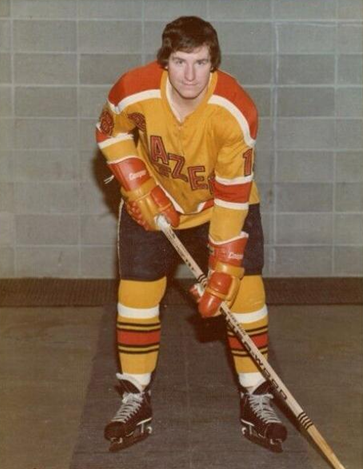
- Born: June 7, 1948 (age 77) Toronto, Ontario, Canada
- Height: 6 ft 1 in (185 cm)
- Weight: 195 lb (88 kg; 13 st 13 lb)
- Position: Centre
- Shot: Left
- Played for: Buffalo Sabres; New England Whalers; Phoenix Roadrunners; Vancouver Blazers; Calgary Cowboys; Indianapolis Racers; Cincinnati Stingers
- Playing career: 1967–1978

Hugh Harris (born June 7, 1948) is a Canadian former professional ice hockey player. He played in the National Hockey League with the Buffalo Sabres during the 1972–73 season and in the World Hockey Association with the New England Whalers, Phoenix Roadrunners, Vancouver Blazers, Calgary Cowboys, Indianapolis Racers, and Cincinnati Stingers between 1973 and 1978.

In his NHL career, Harris appeared in 60 games. He scored 12 goals and added 26 assists. In the WHA, Harris played in 336 games, scoring 107 goals and 174 assists.

Harris was born in Toronto, Ontario.

== Career statistics ==
=== Regular season and playoffs ===
			Regular season					Playoffs
Season	Team	League	GP	G	A	Pts	PIM	GP	G	A	Pts	PIM
1966–67	Weston Dodgers	MetJBHL	—	—	—	—	—	—	—	—	—	—
1966–67	Peterborough Petes	OHA	10	0	1	1	8	—	—	—	—	—
1967–68	Muskegon Mohawks	IHL	63	16	19	35	72	9	2	4	6	4
1968–69	Muskegon Mohawks	IHL	71	33	39	72	83	11	3	9	12	6
1969–70	Muskegon Mohawks	IHL	48	31	25	56	35	6	2	1	3	6
1970–71	Montreal Voyageurs	AHL	5	3	2	5	4	2	0	0	0	14
1970–71	Muskegon Mohawks	IHL	63	39	47	86	86	6	3	3	6	0
1971–72	Cincinnati Swords	AHL	71	18	24	42	70	9	3	4	7	6
1972–73	Buffalo Sabres	NHL	60	12	26	38	17	3	0	0	0	0
1972–73	Cincinnati Swords	AHL	14	7	7	14	37	—	—	—	—	—
1973–74	New England Whalers	WHA	75	24	28	52	78	7	0	4	4	11
1974–75	Phoenix Roadrunners	WHA	22	10	10	20	15	—	—	—	—	—
1974–75	Vancouver Blazers	WHA	58	23	34	57	49	—	—	—	—	—
1975–76	Calgary Cowboys	WHA	30	5	9	14	19	—	—	—	—	—
1975–76	Indianapolis Racers	WHA	41	12	28	40	23	7	2	5	7	8
1976–77	Indianapolis Racers	WHA	46	21	35	56	21	2	0	0	0	0
1977–78	Indianapolis Racers	WHA	19	1	7	8	6	—	—	—	—	—
1977–78	Cincinnati Stingers	WHA	45	11	23	34	30	—	—	—	—	—
WHA totals			336	107	174	281	241	16	2	9	11	19
NHL totals			60	12	26	38	17	3	0	0	0	0
