= David Pulkkinen =

Canadian ice hockey player

- Born: May 18, 1949 (age 75); Kapuskasing, Ontario, Canada
- Height: 6 ft 0 in (183 cm)
- Weight: 195 lb (88 kg; 13 st 13 lb)
- Position: Centre
- Shot: Right
- Played for: New York Islanders
- NHL draft: 77th overall, 1969; St. Louis Blues
- Playing career: 1969–1975

David Joel John "Dave" Pulkkinen (born May 18, 1949) is a Canadian former professional ice hockey player who played two games in the National Hockey League with the New York Islanders during the 1972–73 season. The rest of his career, which lasted from 1969 to 1975, was spent in various minor leagues.

Pulkkinen is of Finnish descent.

== Career statistics ==
=== Regular season and playoffs ===
			Regular season					Playoffs
Season	Team	League	GP	G	A	Pts	PIM	GP	G	A	Pts	PIM
1967–68	Lockerby Composite School	CAHS	—	—	—	—	—	—	—	—	—	—
1968–69	Oshawa Generals	OHA	54	17	19	36	50	—	—	—	—	—
1969–70	Port Huron Flags	IHL	43	11	16	27	51	—	—	—	—	—
1969–70	Kansas City Blues	CHL	11	1	2	3	0	—	—	—	—	—
1970–71	Port Huron Flags	IHL	25	3	12	15	8	—	—	—	—	—
1970–71	Dayton Gems	IHL	1	0	0	0	0	—	—	—	—	—
1971–72	Kansas City Blues	CHL	70	12	46	58	49	—	—	—	—	—
1972–73	New York Islanders	NHL	2	0	0	0	0	—	—	—	—	—
1972–73	New Haven Nighthawks	AHL	75	25	41	66	55	—	—	—	—	—
1973–74	Baltimore Clippers	AHL	60	11	24	35	39	2	0	1	1	0
1974–75	Syracuse Eagles	AHL	11	0	3	3	4	—	—	—	—	—
NHL totals			2	0	0	0	0	—	—	—	—	—
