= Jean-Guy Lagace =

Canadian ice hockey defenceman

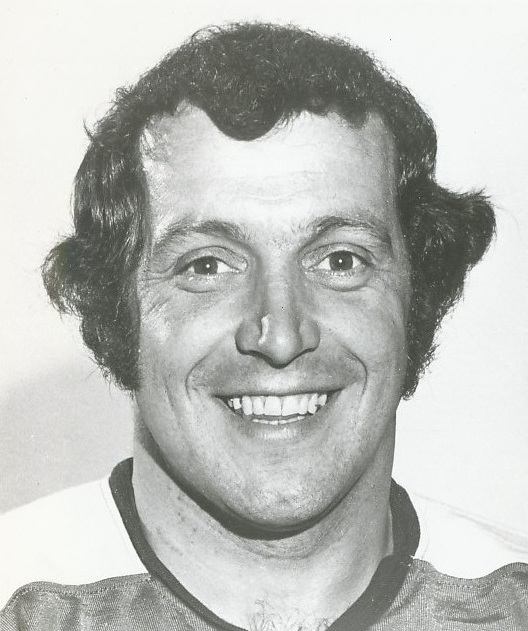
- Lagace in 1973
- Born: February 5, 1945 (age 81) L'Abord-à-Plouffe, Quebec, Canada
- Height: 5 ft 8 in (173 cm)
- Weight: 172 lb (78 kg; 12 st 4 lb)
- Position: Defence
- Shot: Right
- Played for: Pittsburgh Penguins; Buffalo Sabres; Kansas City Scouts; Birmingham Bulls (WHA)
- NHL draft: Undrafted
- Playing career: 1965–1977

Jean-Guy Lagace (born February 5, 1945) is a American/Canadian former professional ice hockey defenceman. He played in the National Hockey League with the Pittsburgh Penguins, Buffalo Sabres, and Kansas City Scouts; in addition, he played one season in the World Hockey Association with the Birmingham Bulls.

In his NHL career, Lagace played in 197 games, scoring nine goals and adding 39 assists. In the WHA, Lagace played in 78 games, scoring two goals and adding 25 assists.

== Career statistics ==
=== Regular season and playoffs ===
			Regular season					Playoffs
Season	Team	League	GP	G	A	Pts	PIM	GP	G	A	Pts	PIM
1965–66	Muskegon Mohawks	IHL	66	10	33	43	63	4	0	0	0	8
1966–67	Muskegon Mohawks	IHL	72	14	25	39	162	—	—	—	—	—
1967–68	Muskegon Mohawks	IHL	65	14	48	62	157	9	2	5	7	42
1968–69	Pittsburgh Penguins	NHL	17	0	1	1	14	—	—	—	—	—
1968–69	Amarillo Wranglers	CHL	49	9	19	28	96	—	—	—	—	—
1969–70	Baltimore Clippers	AHL	68	7	21	28	138	4	1	2	3	2
1970–71	Buffalo Sabres	NHL	3	0	0	0	2	—	—	—	—	—
1970–71	Salt Lake Golden Eagles	WHL	39	2	13	15	83	—	—	—	—	—
1970–71	Amarillo Wranglers	CHL	19	1	15	16	61	—	—	—	—	—
1971–72	Hershey Bears	AHL	61	11	30	41	117	4	0	0	0	8
1972–73	Hershey Bears	AHL	37	7	14	21	54	—	—	—	—	—
1972–73	Pittsburgh Penguins	NHL	31	1	5	6	32	—	—	—	—	—
1973–74	Pittsburgh Penguins	NHL	31	2	6	8	34	—	—	—	—	—
1974–75	Hershey Bears	AHL	6	0	7	7	8	—	—	—	—	—
1974–75	Pittsburgh Penguins	NHL	27	1	8	9	39	—	—	—	—	—
1974–75	Kansas City Scouts	NHL	19	2	9	11	22	—	—	—	—	—
1975–76	Kansas City Scouts	NHL	69	3	10	13	108	—	—	—	—	—
1976–77	Birmingham Bulls	WHA	78	2	25	27	110	—	—	—	—	—
WHA totals			78	2	25	27	110	—	—	—	—	—
NHL totals			197	9	39	48	251	—	—	—	—	—
