= Toledo Blades =

Toledo Blades/Hornets
- City: Toledo, Ohio
- League: IHL
- Operated: 1963–1974
- Home arena: Toledo Sports Arena
- Colors: Gold and Black
- Owner: Ken Wilson (1963–1964)
- General manager: Ken Wilson (1963–1966)
- Head coach: Ken Wilson (1966)

Franchise history
- 1959–1963: Omaha Knights
- 1963–1970: Toledo Blades
- 1970–1974: Toledo Hornets
- 1974–1975: Lansing Lancers

Championships
- Regular season titles: 1 (1963–64)
- Turner Cups: 2 (1963–64, 1966–67)

The Toledo Blades and Hornets were the International Hockey League franchise of Toledo, Ohio from 1963 to 1974. The first four years (1959-1963) of the franchise was in Omaha, NE as the Omaha Knights. After moving to Toledo for the 1963-64 season, they were renamed the Blades. The team name was changed to Hornets in 1970. The franchise left Toledo after the 1973–74 season for Lansing, MI, where they became the Lansing Lancers.

The Blades were the Regular Season Champions in 1963–64, with 86 points and were awarded the Huber Trophy. The Blades won the Turner Cup in 1964 and 1967.

The Leading Rookie Award was awarded to Blades players Don Westbrook in 1964, Bob Thomas in 1965, and Wayne Zuk in 1970.

Blades goaltender, Glenn Ramsay, won the James Norris Memorial Trophy for the fewest goals against during the 1963–64 regular season, his third Norris Trophy in a row. Glenn also won his sixth and final Norris Trophy in 1967.

In 1965, team captain, William "Chick" Chalmers, was awarded the James Gatschene Memorial Trophy, for the player voted most valuable through his display of outstanding playing ability and sportsmanlike conduct over the course of the regular season by the league coaches.

After the Hornets left in 1974, the IHL awarded a new franchise to Toledo, the Goaldiggers.

== Season-by-season record ==
| Turner Cup Champions † | League Leader in points * | Division Champions ¤ |

| Season | Team | Division | Regular season | | | | | | | | Postseason | | | | | |
| Season | Team | Division | Finish | GP | W | L | T | Pts | GF | GA | GP | W | L | GF | GA | Result |
|---|---|---|---|---|---|---|---|---|---|---|---|---|---|---|---|---|
| 1963–64 | Blades | — | 1st | 70 | 41 | 25 | 4 | 86* | 278 | 207 | 13 | 8 | 5 | 43 | 39 | Won in semifinals, 4-3 (Port Huron); Won in Turner Cup Finals, 4-2 (Fort Wayne) † |
| 1964–65 | Blades | — | 4th | 70 | 32 | 36 | 2 | 66 | 297 | 327 | 4 | 0 | 4 | 12 | 24 | Lost in semifinals, 0-4 (Fort Wayne) |
| 1965–66 | Blades | — | 6th | 70 | 20 | 48 | 2 | 42 | 248 | 366 | — | — | — | — | — | Did not qualify |
| 1966–67 | Blades | — | 3rd | 72 | 39 | 31 | 2 | 80 | 284 | 247 | 10 | 8 | 2 | 36 | 23 | Won in semifinals, 4-0 (Dayton); Won in Turner Cup Finals, 4-2 (Fort Wayne) † |
| 1967–68 | Blades | — | 5th | 72 | 29 | 29 | 14 | 72 | 261 | 307 | — | — | — | — | — | Did not qualify |
| 1968–69 | Blades | — | 2nd | 72 | 41 | 23 | 8 | 90 | 282 | 235 | 8 | 3 | 5 | 36 | 38 | Advanced in Round 1, 1-2 (Columbus, Port Huron eliminated); Lost in semifinals, 2-3 (Muskegon) |
| 1969–70 | Blades | Southern | 2nd | 72 | 32 | 33 | 7 | 71 | 241 | 265 | 3 | 0 | 3 | 6 | 11 | Lost in quarterfinals, 0-3 (Des Moines) |
| 1970–71 | Hornets | — | 7th | 72 | 17 | 44 | 11 | 45 | 211 | 319 | — | — | — | — | — | Did not qualify |
| 1971–72 | Hornets | Northern | 4th | 72 | 26 | 46 | 0 | 52 | 270 | 371 | — | — | — | — | — | Did not qualify |
| 1972–73 | Hornets | Northern | 3rd | 74 | 36 | 33 | 5 | 77 | 257 | 261 | 4 | 1 | 3 | 5 | 13 | Lost in quarterfinals, 1-3 (Port Huron) |
| 1973–74 | Hornets | North | 3rd | 76 | 33 | 42 | 1 | 67 | 260 | 302 | 3 | 1 | 2 | 9 | 13 | Lost in quarterfinals, 1-2 (Flint) |
| 11 Seasons | | 0 Division Titles; 1 Huber Trophy | | 792 | 346 | 390 | 56 | 748 (.472) | 2,889 | 3,207 | 45 | 21 | 24 | 147 | 161 | 7 Playoff Appearances; 2 Turner Cup Championships |

== Franchise records ==
=== All-time leaders ===
Goals
| 1 | Greg Jablonski | 271 |
| 2 | William Chalmers | 167 |
| 3 | Stan Maxwell | 140 |
| 4 | Mauril Morrissette | 127 |
| 5 | Jim Sanko | 115 |

Assists
| 1 | William Chalmers | 358 |
| 2 | Greg Jablonski | 352 |
| 3 | John Gravel | 299 |
| 4 | Stan Maxwell | 194 |
| 5 | Jim Sanko | 191 |

Points
| 1 | Greg Jablonski | 623 |
| 2 | William Chalmers | 525 |
| 3 | John Gravel | 376 |
| 4 | Jim Sanko | 306 |
| 5 | Stan Maxwell | 334 |

| Preceded by Toledo Mercurys | Professional Hockey Team in Toledo, Ohio; 1963–1974 | Succeeded by Toledo Goaldiggers |
| Preceded by Fort Wayne Komets | Huber Trophy; Champions; 1963–64 | Succeeded by Port Huron Flags |
| Preceded by Fort Wayne Komets | Turner Cup; Champions; 1963–64 | Succeeded by Fort Wayne Komets |
| Preceded by Port Huron Flags | Turner Cup; Champions; 1966–67 | Succeeded by Muskegon Mohawks |
