= Sandy Snow =

Canadian ice hockey player

- Born: November 11, 1946 (age 78); Glace Bay, Nova Scotia, Canada
- Height: 6 ft 0 in (183 cm)
- Weight: 175 lb (79 kg; 12 st 7 lb)
- Position: Winger
- Shot: Right
- Played for: Detroit Red Wings
- Playing career: 1966–1974

William Alexander "Sandy" Snow (born November 11, 1946) is a Canadian former professional ice hockey winger. Snow played three games in the National Hockey League with the Detroit Red Wings during the 1968–69 season. The rest of his career, which lasted from 1966 to 1974, was spent in the minor leagues.

== Early life ==
Snow was born in Glace Bay. He grew up in Donkin playing on outside rinks in and around the community. He started his career playing on five different teams from 1963 to 1969. He began play in the juniors with the Hamilton Red Wings of the OHA Jr. League and the Weyburn Red Wings of the Saskatchewan Junior Hockey League. Snow scored 182 points in his first four years of junior hockey before getting his shot at competing at a higher level.

== Career ==
Brought up for four games with the Memphis Wings of the CPHL in the 1965–66 season, Snow only recorded one assist, but the coaches saw promise and Snow returned to the lineup the following season as a member of the newly named Fort Worth Wings. He recorded 26 points in the 56 games season and helped Fort Worth in the playoffs by adding another three. The following season Snow improved on those numbers by scoring 34 points in 60 games. He was called up by the Detroit Red Wings to fill in on the fourth line. However, he only played three games, recording two penalty minutes before being traded to the New York Rangers, along with Terry Sawchuk, for Larry Jeffrey on June 17, 1969. The Rangers turned around and traded Snow to the Phoenix Roadrunners of the Western Hockey League along with Don Caley for Peter McDuffe on July 3, 1969.

Snow knocked in 17 goals and 14 assists for Phoenix in 1969–70 and added one goal the following year before being traded to the Kansas City Blues of the Central Hockey League in December 1970. He played in only 12 games before joined the Flint Generals of the International Hockey League to finish out the season. For the next three seasons Snow regained his scoring touch, knocking in 65 goals and 85 assists for the Generals. The 1973–74 season saw Snow join the Brantford Foresters of the OHA Senior A Hockey League and play his last nine games of his career, ending with five points. He retired at the end of the season in 1974.

== Career statistics ==
=== Regular season and playoffs ===
			Regular season					Playoffs
Season	Team	League	GP	G	A	Pts	PIM	GP	G	A	Pts	PIM
1963–64	Hamilton Red Wings	OHA	41	11	15	26	17	—	—	—	—	—
1964–65	Weyburn Red Wings	SJHL	49	46	30	76	35	15	13	10	23	24
1965–66	Hamilton Red Wings	OHA	46	22	25	47	64	5	2	0	2	0
1965–66	Memphis Wings	CHL	4	0	1	1	0	—	—	—	—	—
1966–67	Hamilton Red Wings	OHA	48	13	20	33	52	8	1	1	2	8
1967–68	Fort Worth Wings	CHL	56	13	13	26	17	11	1	2	3	4
1968–69	Detroit Red Wings	NHL	3	0	0	0	2	—	—	—	—	—
1968–69	Fort Worth Wings	CHL	60	13	21	34	19	—	—	—	—	—
1969–70	Phoenix Roadrunners	WHL	72	17	14	31	10	—	—	—	—	—
1970–71	Phoenix Roadrunners	WHL	11	1	0	1	5	—	—	—	—	—
1970–71	Kansas City Blues	CHL	12	2	4	6	2	—	—	—	—	—
1970–71	Flint Generals	IHL	26	7	23	30	4	7	3	4	7	0
1971–72	Flint Generals	IHL	55	30	27	57	8	4	0	2	2	0
1972–73	Flint Generals	IHL	63	28	35	63	12	2	1	0	1	0
1973–74	Brantford Foresters	OHA Sr	9	3	2	5	0	—	—	—	—	—
CHL totals			132	28	39	67	38	11	1	2	3	4
IHL totals			144	65	85	150	24	13	4	6	10	0
NHL totals			3	0	0	0	2	—	—	—	—	—
