= André Pronovost =

Canadian ice hockey player (1936–2026)

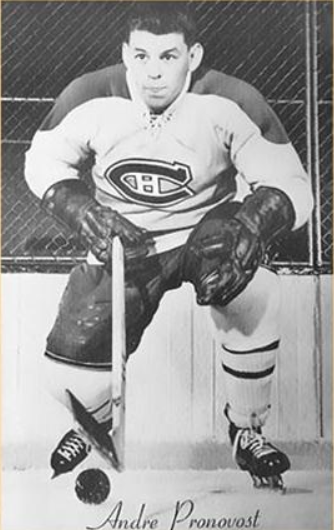
- Pronovost in 1950s photo
- Born: July 9, 1936 Shawinigan, Quebec, Canada
- Died: September 8, 2026 (aged 90) Shawinigan, Quebec, Canada
- Height: 5 ft 9 in (175 cm)
- Weight: 185 lb (84 kg; 13 st 3 lb)
- Position: Left wing
- Shot: Left
- Played for: Montreal Canadiens; Boston Bruins; Detroit Red Wings; Minnesota North Stars
- Playing career: 1955–1972

André Joseph Armand Pronovost (July 9, 1936 – September 8, 2026) was a Canadian professional ice hockey forward. He played in the National Hockey League (NHL) and several minor professional leagues in North America between 1955 and 1972. Pronovost was a member of four Stanley Cup-winning teams of the Montreal Canadiens in the 1950s.

== Playing career ==
Pronovost began his NHL career with the Montreal Canadiens in the 1956-57 season, winning the Stanley Cup as a rookie and then repeating the next three seasons.

The Canadiens traded Pronovost to the Boston Bruins for Jean-Guy Gendron early in the 1960-61 season. Pronovost spent the decade bouncing between the NHL with Boston, the Detroit Red Wings, and Minnesota North Stars and minor league teams. He retired from professional hockey in 1972 after a five-game run with Jersey Devils of the Eastern Hockey League.

In 557 NHL games, Pronvost scored 94 goals and notched 104 assists for 198 points. He added 11 goals and 11 assists in 70 playoff games.

== Personal life and death ==
Pronovost's grandson, Anthony Mantha, currently plays for the New Jersey Devils. Pronovost was in attendance for Mantha's first NHL goal as a member of the Detroit Red Wings, against the Montreal Canadiens on March 24, 2016. His granddaughter, Elizabeth Mantha, is an on-ice official in the American Hockey League.

André was not related to the Pronovost brothers – Marcel, Claude, and Jean Pronovost – whose NHL careers overlapped his.

Following his playing career, Pronovost briefly coached his hometown major-junior team before moving on to a career owning fast-food restaurants. André Pronovost died at a hospital in Shawinigan on September 8, 2026, at the age of 90. He was the last surviving member of the Canadiens dynasty of the late 1950s.

== Career statistics ==
=== Regular season and playoffs ===
			Regular season					Playoffs
Season	Team	League	GP	G	A	Pts	PIM	GP	G	A	Pts	PIM
1953–54	Montreal Jr. Canadiens	QJHL	54	31	46	77	24	—	—	—	—	—
1954–55	Montreal Jr. Canadiens	QJHL	42	22	13	35	60	—	—	—	—	—
1956–57	Shawinigan-Falls Cataracts	QHL	3	0	1	1	4	—	—	—	—	—
1956–57	Shawinigan-Falls Cataracts	QHL	7	2	2	4	11	—	—	—	—	—
1956–57	Montreal Canadiens	NHL	64	10	11	21	58	8	1	0	1	4
1957–58	Montreal Canadiens	NHL	66	16	12	28	55	10	2	0	2	16
1958–59	Montreal Canadiens	NHL	70	9	14	23	48	11	2	1	3	6
1959–60	Montreal Canadiens	NHL	69	12	19	31	61	8	1	2	3	0
1960–61	Montreal Canadiens	NHL	21	1	5	6	4	—	—	—	—	—
1960–61	Boston Bruins	NHL	47	11	11	22	30	—	—	—	—	—
1961–62	Boston Bruins	NHL	70	15	8	23	74	—	—	—	—	—
1962–63	Boston Bruins	NHL	21	0	2	2	6	—	—	—	—	—
1962–63	Detroit Red Wings	NHL	47	13	5	18	18	11	1	4	5	6
1963–64	Detroit Red Wings	NHL	70	7	16	23	54	14	4	3	7	26
1964–65	Detroit Red Wings	NHL	3	0	1	1	0	—	—	—	—	—
1964–65	Pittsburgh Hornets	AHL	22	2	5	7	4	—	—	—	—	—
1964–65	Memphis Wings	CPHL	55	23	38	61	75	—	—	—	—	—
1965–66	Pittsburgh Hornets	AHL	72	25	21	46	64	3	0	1	1	0
1966–67	Memphis Wings	CPHL	70	25	42	67	85	7	1	1	2	19
1967–68	Memphis South Stars	CPHL	60	20	18	38	43	3	2	1	3	0
1967–68	Minnesota North Stars	NHL	8	0	0	0	0	8	0	1	1	0
1968–69	Baltimore Clippers	AHL	25	1	4	5	2	4	0	0	0	0
1968–69	Phoenix Roadrunners	WHL	51	18	14	32	31	—	—	—	—	—
1969–70	Muskegon Mohawks	IHL	71	50	57	107	55	6	0	3	3	8
1970–71	Muskegon Mohawks	IHL	60	18	24	42	24	6	2	0	2	2
1971–72	Jersey Devils	EHL	5	2	1	3	2	—	—	—	—	—
NHL totals			556	94	104	198	408	70	11	11	22	58
