= Frank Golembrosky =

Canadian ice hockey player

- Born: May 3, 1945 (age 79); Calgary, Alberta, Canada
- Height: 6 ft 0 in (183 cm)
- Weight: 200 lb (91 kg; 14 st 4 lb)
- Position: Right wing
- Shot: Right
- Played for: Philadelphia Blazers; Quebec Nordiques
- Playing career: 1965–1976

Frank Golembrosky (born May 3, 1945) is a Canadian former professional ice hockey player who played in the World Hockey Association (WHA). Golembrosky played part of the 1972–73 WHA season with the Philadelphia Blazers and Quebec Nordiques.

== Awards ==
- 1965–66 Gary F. Longman Memorial Trophy (IHL)

== Career statistics ==
			Regular season					Playoffs
Season	Team	League	GP	G	A	Pts	PIM	GP	G	A	Pts	PIM
1964–65	St. Catharines Black Hawks	OHL	10	1	1	2	0	—	—	—	—	—
1964–65	St. Louis Braves	CPHL	4	0	0	0	0	—	—	—	—	—
1965–66	Port Huron Flags	IHL	70	46	37	83	120	9	6	5	11	12
1966–67	St. Louis Braves	CPHL	48	11	4	15	36	—	—	—	—	—
1967–68	Port Huron Flags	IHL	69	22	35	57	162	—	—	—	—	—
1968–69	Dayton Gems	IHL	18	2	4	6	25	—	—	—	—	—
1968–69	Charlotte Checkers	EHL	37	27	29	56	46	3	1	1	2	2
1969–70	Charlotte Checkers	EHL	52	28	30	58	113	6	5	8	13	21
1970–71	Charlotte Checkers	EHL	74	35	62	97	120	13	5	16	22	27
1971–72	Charlotte Checkers	EHL	73	39	67	106	174	12	10	10	20	43
1972–73	Philadelphia Blazers	WHA	8	0	0	0	9	—	—	—	—	—
1972–73	Quebec Nordiques	WHA	52	8	12	20	44	—	—	—	—	—
1973–74	Charlotte Checkers	SHL	26	10	21	31	46	—	—	—	—	—
1974–75	Charlotte Checkers	SHL	27	7	21	28	29	8	2	6	8	19
1975–76	Charlotte Checkers	SHL	48	11	27	38	57	11	3	5	8	21
WHA totals			60	8	12	20	53	—	—	—	—	—
