= Steve Stone (ice hockey) =

Canadian ice hockey player

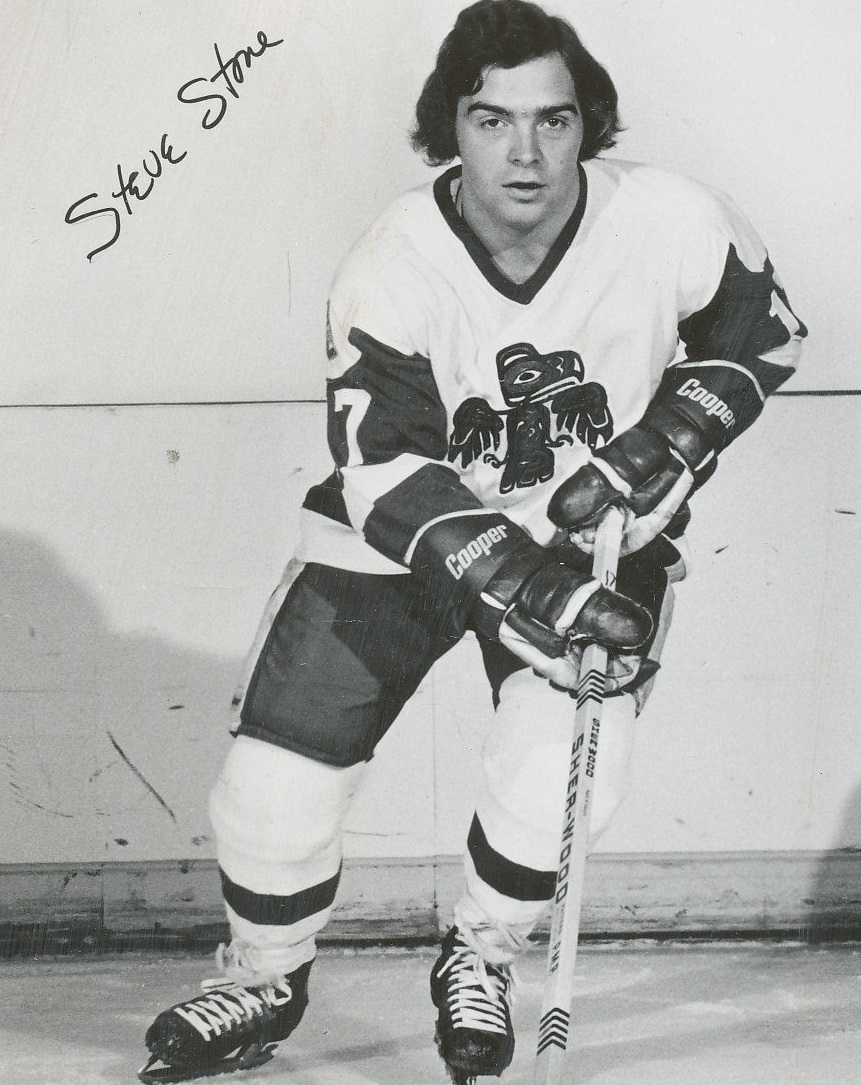
- Stone in 1974
- Born: September 26, 1952 (age 73) Toronto, Ontario, Canada
- Height: 5 ft 8 in (173 cm)
- Weight: 170 lb (77 kg; 12 st 2 lb)
- Position: Right wing
- Shot: Right
- Played for: Vancouver Canucks
- NHL draft: 131st overall, 1972; Vancouver Canucks
- Playing career: 1972–1977

Stephen George Stone (born September 26, 1952) is a Canadian former professional ice hockey player, who played two in the National Hockey League for the Vancouver Canucks in 1974. The rest of his career was mainly spent in the minor International Hockey League, where he played from 1972 until retiring in 1977.

== Playing career ==
Born in Toronto, Ontario, he played in the 1965 Quebec International Pee-Wee Hockey Tournament with a minor ice hockey team from Toronto.

Stone played his junior hockey for the Niagara Falls Flyers alongside future NHL stars such as Don Lever, Eric Vail, and Jim Schoenfeld. He was selected 131st overall in the 1972 NHL Amateur Draft by the Vancouver Canucks, who had just taken his junior linemate Lever 3rd overall and hoped the two could continue their exploits in pro.

Stone would put up big numbers in the minors in his first two seasons in Vancouver's system and earned a call-up midway through the 1973–74 season, appearing in two games on January 11 and January 12, 1974, without recording a point. He would eventually fall out of the Canucks' plans, toiling for three more seasons in the International Hockey League before retiring in 1977.

== Career statistics ==
=== Regular season and playoffs ===
			Regular season					Playoffs
Season	Team	League	GP	G	A	Pts	PIM	GP	G	A	Pts	PIM
1970–71	Niagara Falls Flyers	OHA	57	18	35	53	36	—	—	—	—	—
1971–72	Niagara Falls Flyers	OHA	62	30	62	92	25	6	1	5	6	7
1972–73	Des Moines Capitols	IHL	74	35	49	84	10	3	2	0	2	0
1973–74	Vancouver Canucks	NHL	2	0	0	0	0	—	—	—	—	—
1973–74	Seattle Totems	WHL	77	23	32	55	28	—	—	—	—	—
1974–75	Des Moines Capitols	IHL	72	12	14	26	67	—	—	—	—	—
1975–76	Port Huron Flags	IHL	78	19	42	61	47	15	4	3	7	9
1976–77	Port Huron Flags	IHL	2	0	1	1	0	—	—	—	—	—
IHL totals			226	66	106	172	124	18	6	3	9	9
NHL totals			2	0	0	0	0	—	—	—	—	—
