= 1979–80 IHL season =

North American ice hockey season

The 1979–80 IHL season was the 35th season of the International Hockey League, a North American minor professional league. Ten teams participated in the regular season, and the Kalamazoo Wings won the Turner Cup.

== Regular season ==
North Division	GP	W	L	T	GF	GA	Pts
Kalamazoo Wings	80	45	26	9	366	274	99
Saginaw Gears	80	43	27	10	349	306	96
Port Huron Flags	80	38	26	16	352	300	92
Flint Generals	80	35	32	13	298	316	83
Muskegon Mohawks	80	29	43	8	317	330	66

South Division	GP	W	L	T	GF	GA	Pts
Fort Wayne Komets	80	40	27	13	343	311	93
Toledo Goaldiggers	80	28	34	18	293	345	74
Milwaukee Admirals	80	29	41	10	327	402	68
Grand Rapids Owls	80	27	41	12	327	340	66
Dayton Gems	80	28	45	7	307	355	63

== Turner Cup-Playoffs ==
Turner Cup-Quarterfinals
N1	Kalamazoo Wings	4
N5	Muskegon Mohawks	1
N3	Port Huron Flags	4
N4	Flint Generals	1
S1	Fort Wayne Komets	4
S2	Toledo Goaldiggers	0
N2	Saginaw Gears	4
S3	Milwaukee Admirals	0

Turner Cup-Semifinals
N1	Kalamazoo Wings	4
N3	Port Huron Flags	2
S1	Fort Wayne Komets	4
N2	Saginaw Gears	1

Turner Cup-Final
N1	Kalamazoo Wings	4
S1	Fort Wayne Komets	2

== Awards ==
1989 IHL awards
Turner Cup: (Playoff champion)	Kalamazoo Wings
Fred A. Huber Trophy: (Regular Season champion)	Kalamazoo Wings
Leo P. Lamoureux Memorial Trophy: (Top scorer, regular season)	Al Dumba, Fort Wayne Komets
James Gatschene Memorial Trophy: (Most valuable player, regular season)	Al Dumba, Fort Wayne Komets
Gary F. Longman Memorial Trophy: (Most outstanding first-year player)	Doug Robb, Milwaukee Admirals
Ken McKenzie Trophy: (Most outstanding American-born first-year player)	Bob Janecyk, Fort Wayne Komets
Governor's Trophy: (Best defenceman)	John Gibson, Saginaw Gears
James Norris Memorial Trophy: (goaltender(s) with the fewest goals allowed, regular season)	Larry Lozinski, Kalamazoo Wings

=== All-Star teams ===
First team	Position	Second team
Larry Lozinski, Kalamazoo Wings	G	Bob Janecyk, Fort Wayne Komets
John Gibson, Saginaw Gears	D	Rick Hendricks, Toledo Goaldiggers
Jean Gagnon, Flint Generals	D	Brian McDavid, Kalamazoo Wings
Tom Ross, Kalamazoo Wings	C	Claude St. Sauveur, Milwaukee Admirals
Al Dumba, Fort Wayne Komets	RW	Barry Scully, Fort Wayne Komets
Denis Houle, Port Huron Flags	LW	Scott Gruhl, Saginaw Gears
