= Michel Dumas (ice hockey) =

Canadian ice hockey player and scout

- Born: July 8, 1949 (age 75); Saint-Antoine-de-Pontbriand, Quebec, Canada
- Height: 5 ft 9 in (175 cm)
- Weight: 180 lb (82 kg; 12 st 12 lb)
- Position: Goaltender
- Caught: Left
- Played for: Chicago Black Hawks
- NHL draft: Undrafted
- Playing career: 1969–1977

Michel Joseph Dumas (born July 8, 1949) is a Canadian former ice hockey goaltender and chief amateur scout for the Chicago Blackhawks. Dumas played eight games in the National Hockey League with Chicago during the 1974–75 and 1976–77 seasons. He spent most of his playing career, which lasted from 1969 to 1977, with the Dallas Black Hawks in the Central Hockey League, where he was a two-time Second Team All-Star. His career was cut short after an eye injury while playing against the Colorado Rockies in 1976. Dumas was hired by the Black Hawks the following year as an amateur scout, and was promoted to chief amateur scout in the 1992–93 season, a role he held until 2010. Dumas was born in Saint-Antoine-de-Pontbriand, Quebec.

== Career statistics ==
=== Regular season and playoffs ===
			Regular season									Playoffs
Season	Team	League	GP	W	L	T	MIN	GA	SO	GAA	SV%	GP	W	L	MIN	GA	SO	GAA	SV%
1966–67	Thetford Mines Canadiens	QJAHL	10	—	—	—	600	25	0	2.50	—	—	—	—	—	—	—	—	—
1966–67	Thetford Mines Canadiens	M-Cup	—	—	—	—	—	—	—	—	—	6	4	1	336	20	0	3.57	—
1967–68	Thetford Mines Canadiens	QJAHL	—	—	—	—	—	—	—	—	—	7	3	4	440	44	0	6.00	—
1968–69	Thetford Mines Canadiens	QJAHL	—	—	—	—	—	—	—	—	—	—	—	—	—	—	—	—	—
1969–70	Oklahoma City Blazers	CHL	2	0	1	0	80	9	0	6.75	—	—	—	—	—	—	—	—	—
1969–70	Dayton Gems	IHL	54	—	—	—	3000	180	3	3.60	—	13	8	5	746	36	0	2.90	—
1970–71	Dayton Gems	IHL	49	—	—	—	2811	167	1	3.56	—	5	—	—	300	19	0	3.80	—
1971–72	Dallas Black Hawks	CHL	44	30	10	4	2415	124	3	3.08	—	2	1	1	111	9	0	4.86	—
1972–73	Dallas Black Hawks	CHL	37	—	—	—	2160	108	1	3.00	—	4	—	—	200	16	0	4.80	—
1973–74	Dallas Black Hawks	CHL	67	26	23	16	3896	194	3	2.98	—	10	8	2	580	15	1	1.55	—
1974–75	Chicago Black Hawks	NHL	3	2	0	0	122	7	0	3.47	.833	1	0	0	19	1	0	3.24	.889
1974–75	Dallas Black Hawks	CHL	52	26	20	6	3093	160	4	3.10	—	—	—	—	—	—	—	—	—
1976–77	Chicago Black Hawks	NHL	5	0	1	2	242	17	0	4.23	.879	—	—	—	—	—	—	—	—
NHL totals			8	2	1	2	363	24	0	3.97	.868	1	0	0	19	1	0	3.24	.889
