= Ted Garvin =

Canadian ice hockey player and coach

- Born: August 20, 1923 Sarnia, Ontario, Canada
- Died: November 18, 1992 (aged 69)
- Position: Winger
- Played for: Indianapolis Capitals; St. Louis Flyers; Detroit Auto Club; Sarnia Sailors
- Playing career: 1943–1952

Ted Garvin (August 20, 1923 – November 18, 1992) was a Canadian ice hockey forward and head coach primarily in the International Hockey League.

== Playing career ==
Born in Sarnia, Ontario, he began his playing career in the Eastern Hockey League with the Philadelphia Falcons (1943–44) and Washington Lions (1945–46) and played two seasons with the Sarnia Sailors of the International Hockey League (1949–50 – 1950–51). Garvin led the IHL in goals in the 1949–50 season, scoring 42 with the first-place Sailors. He also finished second in total points that season.

== Coaching career ==
Garvin began his coaching career in 1949-50 when he coached the Sarnia Jr. Sailors to the Western Ontario Jr. 'B' championship, even as he was playing with the Sr. Sailors. In 1968, he coached the fabled Sarnia Legionnaires to the Sutherland Cup as all-Ontario Jr. 'B' champs. He returned to the International Hockey League, where he served as head coach of the Port Huron Flags/Port Huron Wings for four seasons (1968–69 – 1971–72). Garvin was hired to coach the Detroit Red Wings in the National Hockey League for the 1973–74 season, but was fired after his first eleven games in which the team went 2–8–1. He again returned to the IHL as head coach of the Toledo Goaldiggers (1974–75 – 1978–79) and the team advanced to the finals three times and won two Turner Cups in 1974–75 and 1977–78. Garvin also served as head coach of the Muskegon Mohawks in the IHL for one final season in 1980–81.

Ted Garvin is a former NHL referee Kerry Fraser's uncle.

== NHL coaching record ==
| Team | Year | Regular season | | | | | | Postseason |
| Team | Year | G | W | L | T | Pts | Finish | Result |
|---|---|---|---|---|---|---|---|---|
| Detroit Red Wings | 1973-74 | 11 | 2 | 8 | 1 | (68) | 6th in East | (fired) |

| Preceded by Johnny Wilson | Head coach of the Detroit Red Wings; 1973 | Succeeded by Alex Delvecchio |
