= 1980–81 IHL season =

North American ice hockey season

The 1980–81 IHL season was the 36th season of the International Hockey League, a North American minor professional league. Eight teams participated in the regular season, and the Saginaw Gears won the Turner Cup.

== Regular season ==
East Division	GP	W	L	T	GF	GA	Pts
Saginaw Gears	82	45	29	8	392	289	98
Port Huron Flags	82	31	35	16	337	377	78
Flint Generals	82	32	42	8	324	363	72
Toledo Goaldiggers	82	26	47	9	303	392	61

West Division	GP	W	L	T	GF	GA	Pts
Kalamazoo Wings	82	52	20	10	369	244	114
Fort Wayne Komets	82	37	30	15	337	303	89
Milwaukee Admirals	82	32	35	15	354	371	79
Muskegon Mohawks	82	28	45	9	274	351	65

== Turner Cup Playoffs ==
Turner Cup quarterfinals
E3	Flint Generals	2
W4	Muskegon Mohawks	1
E1	Saginaw Gears	4
E2	Port Huron Flags	0
W2	Fort Wayne Komets	4
W3	Milwaukee Admirals	3

Turner Cup semifinals
W1	Kalamazoo Wings	4
E3	Flint Generals	0
E1	Saginaw Gears	4
W2	Fort Wayne Komets	1

Turner Cup final
W1	Kalamazoo Wings	0
E1	Saginaw Gears	4

=== Quarterfinals ===
==== (E3) Flint Generals vs. (W4) Muskegon Mohawks ====
April 8	Muskegon Mohawks	1–4	Flint Generals	IMA Sports Arena

April 9	Flint Generals	1–2	Muskegon Mohawks	L. C. Walker Arena

April 11	Muskegon Mohawks	4–5	OT	Flint Generals	IMA Sports Arena

Flint won series 2–1

==== (E1) Saginaw Gears vs. (E2) Port Huron Flags ====
April 8	Port Huron Flags	0–3	Saginaw Gears	Saginaw Civic Center

April 10	Saginaw Gears	4–1	Port Huron Flags	McMorran Arena

April 11	Port Huron Flags	3–4	OT	Saginaw Gears	Saginaw Civic Center

April 15	Saginaw Gears	4–3	Port Huron Flags	McMorran Arena

Saginaw won series 4–0

==== (W2) Fort Wayne Komets vs. (W3) Milwaukee Admirals ====
April 8	Milwaukee Admirals	4–5	OT	Fort Wayne Komets	War Memorial Coliseum

April 9	Fort Wayne Komets	4–8	Milwaukee Admirals	Wilson Park Recreation Center

April 11	Milwaukee Admirals	3–4	Fort Wayne Komets	War Memorial Coliseum

April 15	Fort Wayne Komets	2–4	Milwaukee Admirals	Wilson Park Recreation Center

April 17	Milwaukee Admirals	5–4	Fort Wayne Komets	War Memorial Coliseum

April 18	Fort Wayne Komets	4–2	Milwaukee Admirals	Wilson Park Recreation Center

April 20	Milwaukee Admirals	3–7	Fort Wayne Komets	War Memorial Coliseum

Fort Wayne won series 4–3

=== Semifinals ===
==== (W1) Kalamazoo Wings vs. (E3) Flint Generals ====
April 18	Flint Generals	0–5	Kalamazoo Wings	Wings Stadium

April 22	Kalamazoo Wings	5–4	Flint Generals	IMA Sports Arena

April 24	Flint Generals	3–10	Kalamazoo Wings	Wings Stadium

April 26	Kalamazoo Wings	7–6	Flint Generals	IMA Sports Arena

Kalamazoo won series 4–0

==== (E1) Saginaw Gears vs. (W2) Fort Wayne Komets ====
April 22	Fort Wayne Komets	0–2	Saginaw Gears	Saginaw Civic Center

April 24	Saginaw Gears	4–5	Fort Wayne Komets	War Memorial Coliseum

April 25	Fort Wayne Komets	2–10	Saginaw Gears	Saginaw Civic Center

April 29	Saginaw Gears	4–3	Fort Wayne Komets	War Memorial Coliseum

May 1	Fort Wayne Komets	2–6	Saginaw Gears	Saginaw Civic Center

Saginaw won series 4–1

=== Turner Cup final ===
==== (W1) Kalamazoo Wings vs. (E1) Saginaw Gears ====
May 3	Saginaw Gears	6–3	Kalamazoo Wings	Wings Stadium

May 6	Kalamazoo Wings	3–4	Saginaw Gears	Saginaw Civic Center

May 8	Saginaw Gears	4–3	Kalamazoo Wings	Wings Stadium

May 9	Kalamazoo Wings	1–4	Saginaw Gears	Saginaw Civic Center

Saginaw won series 4–0
