= 1975–76 IHL season =

North American ice hockey season

The 1975–76 IHL season was the 31st season of the International Hockey League, a North American minor professional league. Nine teams participated in the regular season, and the Dayton Gems won the Turner Cup.

== Regular season ==
Northern Division	GP	W	L	T	GF	GA	Pts
Saginaw Gears	78	43	26	9	339	293	95
Port Huron Flags	78	36	31	11	304	291	83
Flint Generals	78	34	30	14	285	254	82
Muskegon Mohawks	78	34	31	13	260	238	81
Kalamazoo Wings	78	27	41	10	273	326	64

Southern Division	GP	W	L	T	GF	GA	Pts
Dayton Gems	78	47	21	10	340	240	104
Fort Wayne Komets	78	28	36	14	289	309	70
Toledo Goaldiggers	78	27	37	14	269	293	68
Columbus Owls	78	24	47	7	251	366	55

== Turner Cup-Playoffs ==
Turner Cup-Quarterfinals
N1	Saginaw Gears	4
N4	Muskegon Mohawks	1
N2	Port Huron Flags	4
N3	Flint Generals	0
S1	Dayton Gems	4
N5	Kalamazoo Wings	2
S2	Fort Wayne Komets	4
S3	Toledo Goaldiggers	0

Turner Cup-Semifinals
N1	Saginaw Gears	0
N2	Port Huron Flags	4
S1	Dayton Gems	4
S2	Fort Wayne Komets	1

Turner Cup-Final
N2	Port Huron Flags	0
S1	Dayton Gems	3
