= Toledo Goaldiggers =

Former professional minor league ice hockey team in Toledo, Ohio

- City: Toledo, Ohio
- League: IHL
- Operated: 1974–1986
- Home arena: Toledo Sports Arena
- Colors: Kelly green, gold, white

Franchise history
- 1974–1986: Toledo Goaldiggers
- 1990–2001: Kansas City Blades

Championships
- Regular season titles: 2 (1981–82, 1982–83)
- Division titles: 2 (1976–77, 1982–83)
- Turner Cups: 4 (1974–75, 1977–78, 1981–82, 1982–83)

The Toledo Goaldiggers were a minor professional ice hockey club based in Toledo, Ohio, from 1974 to 1986. They played in the International Hockey League (IHL) and held their home games at the Toledo Sports Arena on the east side of Toledo. Prior to the Goaldiggers, Toledo had two minor league franchises – the Mercurys (1947–1962) and Blades/Hornets (1963–1974).

== History ==
During their 12-year history, the Goaldiggers qualified for the post season 10 times, reaching the playoff finals six times (1975, 1977, 1978, 1982, 1983 and 1984) winning four Turner Cup playoff championships (1975, 1978, 1982, and 1983). Also, the "Diggers" won two regular season championships (Fred A. Huber, Jr. Memorial Trophy) finishing with the most points in the IHL two consecutive seasons (1981–82 and 1982–83).

In 1981, Bill Beagan became a partial owner and the general manager of the Goaldiggers. Under his management, the team won Turner Cup championships during the 1981–82 IHL season and the 1982–83 IHL season.

After the 1985–86 season the franchise was forced to suspend operations due to financial difficulties and poor attendance. The dormant franchise was eventually sold to Russ and Diane Parker and moved to Kansas City, Missouri, where they became the Kansas City Blades in 1990.

== Season-by-season record ==
Turner Cup champions †	League leader in points *	Division champions ¤

Season	Division	Regular season									Postseason					
Season	Division	Finish	GP	W	L	T	SOL	Pts	GF	GA	GP	W	L	GF	GA	Result
1974–75	South	3rd	76	34	38	4	—	72	285	275	19	12	7	83	73	Won in quarterfinals, 4–1 (Columbus); Won in semifinals, 4–3 (Dayton); Won in Turner Cup finals, 4–3 (Saginaw) †
1975–76	South	3rd	78	27	37	14	—	68	269	293	4	0	4	14	23	Lost in quarterfinals, 0–4 (Fort Wayne)
1976–77	South ¤	1st	78	40	31	7	—	87	321	317	19	11	8	73	78	Won in quarterfinals, 4–3 (Columbus); Won in semifinals, 4–1 (Fort Wayne); Lost in Turner Cup finals, 3–4 (Saginaw)
1977–78	South	2nd	80	34	28	18	—	86	331	316	13	8	5	82	51	Won in quarterfinals, 4–1 (Milwaukee); Won in semifinals, 4–1 (Fort Wayne); Won in Turner Cup finals, 4–2 (Port Huron) †
1978–79	South	3rd	80	35	32	13	—	83	320	302	6	2	4	21	30	Lost in quarterfinals, 2–4 (Fort Wayne)
1979–80	South	2nd	80	28	34	18	—	74	293	345	4	0	4	7	25	Lost in quarterfinals, 0–4 (Fort Wayne)
1980–81	East	4th	82	26	47	9	—	61	303	392	—	—	—	—	—	Did not qualify
1981–82	—	1st	82	53	24	4	1	111*	407	320	13	10	3	64	48	Won in quarterfinals, 4–0 (Flint); Advanced in semifinals, 2–2 (Saginaw, Toledo advance, Fort Wayne eliminated); Won in Turner Cup finals, 4–1 (Saginaw) †
1982–83	East ¤	1st	82	51	20	10	1	113*	362	269	11	8	3	61	35	Advanced in quarterfinals (bye); Won in semifinals, 4–1 (Fort Wayne); Won in Turner Cup finals, 4–2 (Milwaukee) †
1983–84	—	4th	82	41	32	5	4	91	326	318	13	6	7	48	49	Won in quarterfinals, 2–1 (Kalamazoo); Won in semifinals, 4–2 (Fort Wayne); Lost in Turner Cup finals, 0–4 (Flint)
1984–85	East	4th	82	32	42	5	3	72	292	362	6	2	4	15	26	Lost in quarterfinals, 2–4 (Muskegon)
1985–86	East	4th	82	24	48	0	10	58	293	421	—	—	—	—	—	Did not qualify
12 seasons	2 division titles 2 Huber Trophies		964	425	413	107	19	976 (.506)	3,802	3,930	108	59	49	468	438	10 playoff appearances 4 Turner Cup championships

== Franchise records ==
=== All-time leaders ===
Goals
1	Dave Falkenberg	177
2	Jim McCabe	169
3	Dirk Graham	159
4	Ian MacPhee	140
5	Paul Tantardini	115

Assists
1	Dave Falkenberg	261
2	Jim McCabe	236
3	Paul Tantardini	210
4	Ian MacPhee	193
5	Bill Joyce	166

Points
1	Dave Falkenberg	438
2	Jim McCabe	405
3	Ian MacPhee	333
4	Paul Tantardini	325
5	Dirk Graham	315

Preceded by Toledo Hornets	Professional Hockey Team in Toledo, Ohio; 1974–1986	Succeeded by Toledo Storm
Preceded by Des Moines Capitols	Turner Cup champions 1974–75	Succeeded by Dayton Gems
Preceded by Saginaw Gears	Turner Cup champions 1977–78	Succeeded by Kalamazoo Wings
Preceded by Kalamazoo Wings	Huber Trophy champions 1981–82, 1982–83	Succeeded by Fort Wayne Komets
Preceded by Saginaw Gears	Turner Cup champions 1981–82, 1982–83	Succeeded by Flint Generals
