= 1972–73 IHL season =

North American ice hockey season

The 1972–73 IHL season was the 28th season of the International Hockey League, a North American minor professional league. Nine teams participated in the regular season, and the Fort Wayne Komets won the Turner Cup.

== Regular season ==
Northern Division	GP	W	L	T	GF	GA	Pts
Flint Generals	74	44	29	1	347	281	89
Port Huron Wings	73	41	31	1	266	237	83
Toledo Hornets	74	36	33	5	257	261	77
Muskegon Mohawks	74	36	34	4	302	259	76
Saginaw Gears	74	30	41	3	305	304	63

Southern Division	GP	W	L	T	GF	GA	Pts
Fort Wayne Komets	74	48	23	3	308	219	99
Dayton Gems	73	44	25	4	308	235	92
Des Moines Capitols	74	30	41	3	279	360	63
Columbus Golden Seals	74	10	62	2	177	393	22

== Turner Cup Playoffs ==
Turner Cup Pre-Playoffs
N2	Port Huron Wings	3
N3	Toledo Hornets	1
S2	Dayton Gems	3
S3	Des Moines Capitols	0

Turner Cup Semifinals
N1	Flint Generals	1
S1	Fort Wayne Komets	4
N2	Port Huron Wings	3
S2	Dayton Gems	0

Turner Cup Final
S1	Fort Wayne Komets	4
N2	Port Huron Wings	0
