= Fred A. Huber Trophy =

The Fred A. Huber Trophy was awarded annually by the International Hockey League to the North American ice hockey team with the most points during the regular season. The trophy for the league championship was originally named the J. P. McGuire Trophy, the owner of Detroit car dealership, and sponsor. In 1954, the trophy was renamed for Fred A. Huber Jr. On September 24, 2007, the second incarnation of the IHL renamed the Tarry Cup as the Huber Trophy as a tribute to the original league.

== Winners ==
J. P. McGuire Trophy
Season	Team	Points
1946–47	Windsor Staffords	37
1947–48	Windsor Hettche Spitfires	39
1948–49	Toledo Mercurys	48
1949–50	Sarnia Sailors	55
1950–51	Grand Rapids Rockets	84
1951–52	Grand Rapids Rockets	64
1952–53	Cincinnati Mohawks	90
1953–54	Cincinnati Mohawks	96
Fred A. Huber Trophy
Season	Team	Points
1954–55	Cincinnati Mohawks	81
1955–56	Cincinnati Mohawks	92
1956–57	Cincinnati Mohawks	101
1957–58	Cincinnati Mohawks	91
1958–59	Louisville Rebels	71
1959–60	Fort Wayne Komets	102
1960–61	Minneapolis Millers	102
1961–62	Muskegon Zephyrs	88
1962–63	Fort Wayne Komets	75
1963–64	Toledo Blades	86
1964–65	Port Huron Flags	91
1965–66	Muskegon Mohawks	97
1966–67	Dayton Gems	91
1967–68	Muskegon Mohawks	98
1968–69	Dayton Gems	91
1969–70	Muskegon Mohawks	100
1970–71	Muskegon Mohawks	91
1971–72	Muskegon Mohawks	100
1972–73	Fort Wayne Komets	99
1973–74	Des Moines Capitols	96
1974–75	Muskegon Mohawks	99
1975–76	Dayton Gems	104
1976–77	Saginaw Gears	91
1977–78	Fort Wayne Komets	97
1978–79	Grand Rapids Owls	109
1979–80	Kalamazoo Wings	99
1980–81	Kalamazoo Wings	114
1981–82	Toledo Goaldiggers	111
1982–83	Toledo Goaldiggers	113
1983–84	Fort Wayne Komets	112
1984–85	Peoria Rivermen	105
1985–86	Fort Wayne Komets	112
1986–87	Fort Wayne Komets	104
1987–88	Muskegon Lumberjacks	126
1988–89	Muskegon Lumberjacks	121
1989–90	Muskegon Lumberjacks	116
1990–91	Peoria Rivermen	121
1991–92	Kansas City Blades	116
1992–93	San Diego Gulls	132
1993–94	Las Vegas Thunder	115
1994–95	Denver Grizzlies	120
1995–96	Las Vegas Thunder	122
1996–97	Detroit Vipers	122
1997–98	Long Beach Ice Dogs	115
1998–99	Houston Aeros	121
1999-00	Chicago Wolves	114
2000–01	Grand Rapids Griffins	113
