= 1974–75 IHL season =

North American ice hockey season

The 1974–75 IHL season was the 30th season of the International Hockey League, a North American minor professional league. 11 teams participated in the regular season, and the Toledo Goaldiggers won the Turner Cup.

== Regular season ==
North Division	GP	W	L	T	GF	GA	Pts
Muskegon Mohawks	75	48	24	3	325	240	99
Flint Generals	75	44	26	5	287	220	93
Saginaw Gears	75	43	29	3	302	259	89
Port Huron Flags	76	35	38	3	255	270	73
Kalamazoo Wings	75	17	53	5	203	318	39
Lansing Lancers	41	12	28	1	145	216	25

South Division	GP	W	L	T	GF	GA	Pts
Dayton Gems	75	46	26	3	297	256	95
Columbus Owls	76	40	32	4	307	275	84
Toledo Goaldiggers	76	34	38	4	285	275	72
Des Moines Capitols	76	31	38	7	253	264	69
Fort Wayne Komets	76	26	44	6	247	313	58

== Turner Cup-Playoffs ==
Turner Cup-Quarterfinals
N1	Muskegon Mohawks	4
N4	Port Huron Flags	1
N2	Flint Generals	1
N3	Saginaw Gears	4
S1	Dayton Gems	4
S4	Des Moines Capitols	3
S2	Columbus Owls	1
S3	Toledo Goaldiggers	4

Turner Cup-Semifinals
N1	Muskegon Mohawks	3
N3	Saginaw Gears	4
S1	Dayton Gems	3
S3	Toledo Goaldiggers	4

Turner Cup-Final
N3	Saginaw Gears	3
S3	Toledo Goaldiggers	4
