= 1971–72 IHL season =

North American ice hockey season

The 1971–72 IHL season was the 27th season of the International Hockey League, a North American minor professional league. Eight teams participated in the regular season, and the Port Huron Wings won the Turner Cup.

== Regular season ==
Northern Division	GP	W	L	T	GF	GA	Pts
Muskegon Mohawks	72	49	21	2	328	231	100
Port Huron Wings	72	37	31	4	276	262	78
Flint Generals	72	31	36	5	253	259	67
Toledo Hornets	72	26	46	0	270	371	52

Southern Division	GP	W	L	T	GF	GA	Pts
Dayton Gems	72	49	23	0	319	243	98
Fort Wayne Komets	72	37	33	2	291	244	76
Des Moines Oak Leafs	72	35	34	3	296	278	73
Columbus Golden Seals	72	15	55	2	220	365	32

== Turner Cup Playoffs ==
Turner Cup Pre-Playoffs
N2	Port Huron Wings	3
N3	Flint Generals	1
S2	Fort Wayne Komets	3
S3	Des Moines Oak Leafs	0

Turner Cup Semifinals
N1	Muskegon Mohawks	4
S1	Dayton Gems	1
N2	Port Huron Wings	3
S2	Fort Wayne Komets	2

Turner Cup Final
N1	Muskegon Mohawks	2
N2	Port Huron Wings	4
