= 1967–68 IHL season =

North American ice hockey season

The 1967–68 IHL season was the 23rd season of the International Hockey League, a North American minor professional league. Seven teams participated in the regular season, and the Muskegon Mohawks won the Turner Cup.

== Regular season ==
	GP	W	L	T	GF	GA	Pts
Muskegon Mohawks	72	43	17	12	305	216	98
Dayton Gems	72	33	27	12	332	275	78
Columbus Checkers	72	32	30	10	312	300	74
Fort Wayne Komets	72	30	29	13	282	272	73
Toledo Blades	72	29	29	14	261	307	72
Port Huron Flags	72	25	36	11	269	343	61
Des Moines Oak Leafs	72	19	43	10	244	292	48

== Turner Cup-playoffs ==
Turner-Cup-semifinals
1	Muskegon Mohawks	4
3	Columbus Checkers	0
2	Dayton Gems	4
4	Fort Wayne Komets	2

Turner-Cup-final
1	Muskegon Mohawks	4
2	Dayton Gems	1
