= 1964–65 IHL season =

North American ice hockey season

The 1964–65 IHL season was the 20th season of the International Hockey League, a North American minor professional league. Six teams participated in the regular season, and the Fort Wayne Komets won the Turner Cup.

== Regular season ==
	GP	W	L	T	GF	GA	Pts
Port Huron Flags	70	43	22	5	336	258	91
Fort Wayne Komets	70	40	25	5	344	240	85
Des Moines Oak Leafs	70	39	26	5	303	277	83
Toledo Blades	70	32	36	2	297	327	66
Dayton Gems	70	23	45	2	283	396	48
Muskegon Zephyrs	70	22	45	3	320	385	47

== Turner Cup-Playoffs ==
Turner-Cup-Semifinals
2	Fort Wayne Komets	4
4	Toledo Blades	0
1	Port Huron Flags	3
3	Des Moines Oak Leafs	4

Turner-Cup-Final
2	Fort Wayne Komets	4
3	Des Moines Oak Leafs	2
