= Muskegon Zephyrs =

- City: Muskegon
- League: International Hockey League
- Operated: 1960–1965
- Home arena: L. C. Walker Arena (capacity: 4,000)

Franchise history
- 1960–1965: Muskegon Zephyrs
- 1965–1984: Muskegon Mohawks
- 1984–1992: Muskegon Lumberjacks
- 1992–2001: Cleveland Lumberjacks

Championships
- Turner Cups: 1 (1962)

The Muskegon Zephyrs were a minor league professional ice hockey team in the International Hockey League from 1960 to 1965. Muskegon were Turner Cup champions in 1962. In 1962–63, Zephyrs defenceman Gerry Glaude became the first defenceman in pro hockey history to score 100 points in one season.

For the first four seasons, the team was coached by Moose Lallo. Lallo was replaced by Lorne Davis prior to the start of the 1964–65 season, although, Lallo continued to play for the team.

After the completion of the 1964–65 season, the team was renamed the Muskegon Mohawks.

== Season-by-season results ==
Season	Games	Won	Lost	Tied	Points	Goals for	Goals against
1960–61	70	25	41	4	54	243	319
1961–62	68	43	23	2	88	334	242
1962–63	70	34	31	5	72	228	326
1963–64	70	31	36	3	65	298	312
1964–65	70	22	45	3	47	320	385
Totals	348	155	176	17	326	1,423	1,584
