= 1963–64 IHL season =

North American ice hockey season

The 1963–64 IHL season was the 19th season of the International Hockey League, a North American minor professional league. Seven teams participated in the regular season, and the Toledo Blades won the Turner Cup.

== Regular season ==
	GP	W	L	T	GF	GA	Pts
Toledo Blades	70	41	25	4	278	207	86
Fort Wayne Komets	70	41	28	1	322	264	83
Port Huron Flags	70	37	31	2	279	279	76
Windsor Bulldogs	70	32	35	3	226	280	67
Des Moines Oak Leafs	70	31	35	4	272	266	66
Muskegon Zephyrs	70	31	36	3	298	312	65
Chatham Maroons	70	21	44	5	211	278	47

== Turner Cup-Playoffs ==
Turner-Cup-Semifinals
1	Toledo Blades	4
3	Port Huron Flags	3
2	Fort Wayne Komets	4
4	Windsor Bulldogs	2

Turner-Cup-Final
1	Toledo Blades	4
2	Fort Wayne Komets	2
