= 1966–67 IHL season =

North American ice hockey season

The 22nd season of the International Hockey League, a North American minor professional league, was played in 1966–67. Seven teams participated in the regular season, and the Toledo Blades won the Turner Cup.

== Regular season ==
	GP	W	L	T	GF	GA	Pts
Dayton Gems	72	44	25	3	315	282	91
Fort Wayne Komets	72	40	31	1	274	234	81
Toledo Blades	72	39	31	2	284	247	80
Des Moines Oak Leafs	72	36	32	4	256	264	76
Port Huron Flags	72	34	33	5	314	300	73
Muskegon Mohawks	72	27	43	2	262	299	56
Columbus Checkers	72	23	48	1	294	373	47

== Turner Cup-Playoffs ==
Turner-Cup-Semifinals
2	Fort Wayne Komets	4
4	Des Moines Oak Leafs	3
1	Dayton Gems	0
3	Toledo Blades	4

Turner-Cup-Final
2	Fort Wayne Komets	2
3	Toledo Blades	4
