= 1968–69 IHL season =

North American ice hockey season

The 1968–69 IHL season was the 24th season of the International Hockey League, a North American minor professional league. Seven teams participated in the regular season, and the Dayton Gems won the Turner Cup.

== Regular season ==
	GP	W	L	T	GF	GA	Pts
Dayton Gems	72	40	21	11	313	227	91
Toledo Blades	72	41	23	8	282	235	90
Muskegon Mohawks	72	34	29	9	332	287	77
Port Huron Flags	72	28	30	14	285	289	70
Fort Wayne Komets	72	24	33	15	235	262	63
Columbus Checkers	72	26	37	9	286	333	61
Des Moines Oak Leafs	72	21	41	10	226	326	52

== Turner Cup-Playoffs ==
	GP	W	L	GF	GA	Pts
Muskegon Mohawks	3	3	0	20	6	6
Dayton Gems	3	3	0	8	6	6
Toledo Blades	3	1	2	15	7	2
Fort Wayne Komets	3	1	2	10	15	2
Columbus Checkers	3	1	2	10	15	2
Port Huron Flags	3	0	3	11	16	0

Turner-Cup-Semifinals
1	Muskegon Mohawks	3
3	Toledo Blades	2
2	Dayton Gems	3
4	Fort Wayne Komets	0

Turner-Cup-Final
1	Muskegon Mohawks	0
2	Dayton Gems	3
