= 1969–70 IHL season =

North American ice hockey season

The 1969–70 IHL season was the 25th season of the International Hockey League (IHL), a North American minor professional league. Eight teams participated in the regular season, and the Dayton Gems won the Turner Cup. Bill Beagan succeeded Andy Mulligan as IHL commissioner in August 1969.

== Regular season ==
Northern Division	GP	W	L	T	GF	GA	Pts
Muskegon Mohawks	72	46	18	8	356	271	100
Port Huron Flags	72	37	28	7	272	270	81
Fort Wayne Komets	72	26	38	8	241	266	60
Flint Generals	72	21	39	12	218	270	54

Southern Division	GP	W	L	T	GF	GA	Pts
Dayton Gems	72	38	30	4	296	271	80
Toledo Blades	72	32	33	7	241	265	71
Des Moines Oak Leafs	72	31	33	8	261	254	70
Columbus Checkers	72	24	36	12	289	307	60

== Turner Cup-Playoffs ==
Turner-Cup-Pre-Playoffs
S1	Dayton Gems
Bye
N1	Muskegon Mohawks
Bye
N2	Port Huron Flags	3
N3	Fort Wayne Komets	0
S2	Toledo Blades	0
S3	Des Moines Oak Leafs	3

Turner-Cup-Semifinals
S1	Dayton Gems	4
N1	Muskegon Mohawks	2
N2	Port Huron Flags	3
S3	Des Moines Oak Leafs	2

Turner-Cup-Final
S1	Dayton Gems	4
N2	Port Huron Flags	3
