= 1965–66 IHL season =

North American ice hockey season

The 1965–66 IHL season was the 21st season of the International Hockey League, a North American minor professional league. Six teams participated in the regular season, and the Port Huron Flags won the Turner Cup.

== Regular season ==
	GP	W	L	T	GF	GA	Pts
Muskegon Mohawks	70	46	19	5	376	314	97
Fort Wayne Komets	70	38	26	6	312	259	82
Port Huron Flags	70	34	32	4	308	274	72
Dayton Gems	70	33	35	2	347	322	68
Des Moines Oak Leafs	70	29	40	1	263	319	59
Toledo Blades	70	20	48	2	248	366	42

== Turner Cup-Playoffs ==
Turner-Cup-Semifinals
1	Muskegon Mohawks	0
3	Port Huron Flags	4
2	Fort Wayne Komets	2
4	Dayton Gems	4

Turner-Cup-Final
3	Port Huron Flags	4
4	Dayton Gems	1
