= 1970–71 IHL season =

North American ice hockey season

The 1970–71 IHL season was the 26th season of the International Hockey League, a North American minor professional league. Seven teams participated in the regular season, and the Port Huron Flags won the Turner Cup.

== Regular season ==
	GP	W	L	T	GF	GA	Pts
Muskegon Mohawks	72	43	24	5	300	212	91
Des Moines Oak Leafs	72	38	23	11	286	233	87
Dayton Gems	72	36	29	7	263	263	79
Flint Generals	72	33	32	7	247	224	73
Fort Wayne Komets	72	28	32	12	221	233	68
Port Huron Flags	72	25	36	11	248	292	61
Toledo Hornets	72	17	44	11	211	319	45

== Turner Cup-Playoffs ==
=== Quarterfinals ===
- Port Huron Flags - Muskegon Mohawks 4:2 on series
- Des Moines Oak Leafs - Fort Wayne Komets 4:1 on series
- Dayton Gems - Flint Generals 4:3 on series

=== Semifinals ===
The semifinals were a round-robin with the Port Huron Flags, Des Moines Oak Leafs, and the Dayton Gems competing. The Flags and Oak Leafs advanced to the finals.

- Des Moines - Dayton 4:2
- Port Huron - Des Moines 6:3
- Dayton - Port Huron 9:5
- Des Moines - Dayton 5:1

=== Final ===
- Port Huron Flags - Des Moines Oak Leafs 4:2 on series
