= Saginaw Gears (IHL) =

Minor-league ice hockey team in Saginaw, Michigan (1972–1983)

The Saginaw Gears were a minor-league ice hockey franchise based in Saginaw, Michigan, that played in the defunct International Hockey League (IHL). The Gears existed from 1972 to 1983 and played their home games at Wendler Arena in the Saginaw Civic Center (now known as The Dow Event Center).

IHL hockey would later return to the Tri-Cities when the Flint Generals were moved to Saginaw to become the Saginaw Generals for the 1985–1986 season.

== Championships ==
The Gears made the playoffs for nine straight seasons, from 1973 to 1982. The Gears reached the Turner Cup Finals five times in that stretch, and won the following championships:

Season	League	Trophy
1976–77	IHL	Fred A. Huber Trophy
1976–77	IHL	Turner Cup
1980–81	IHL	Turner Cup

== Trivia ==
The Turner Cup replica at the Hockey Hall of Fame in Toronto has Saginaw misspelled as "Sagimaw" for the 1976-77 championship.

== Notable players ==
The Gears sent several players to the National Hockey League in their 11-year existence. The biggest names include:

- John Gibson
- Lou Franceschetti
- Bob Froese
- Greg Hotham, whose sons Scott and Andrew played for the Saginaw Spirit
- Mario Lessard
- Mike Palmateer
- In 1974–75, longtime NHL forward/defenceman Reg Fleming joined the Gears in time for the 1975 playoffs.
- Head Coach Don Perry also made it to the NHL, coaching the Los Angeles Kings from 1981 to 1984.
- Marcel Comeau, 1980–81 IHL's top scorer and most valuable player
- Dennis Desrosiers 10 year veteran of the Gears. High scoring right wing / tough guy. Color commentator of Saginaw Spirit Decades long career as a coach
