= Flint Generals (1969–1985) =

- City: Flint, Michigan
- League: IHL
- Founded: 1969
- Folded: 1985
- Home arena: IMA Sports Arena

The Flint Generals were a professional hockey team in Flint, Michigan from 1969–1985. They were members of the International Hockey League and played their home games at the IMA Sports Arena. Their team colors were originally black and gold, but they were changed to royal blue, gold, and white. They were moved to Saginaw, Michigan after the 1985 season, becoming the Saginaw Generals. After the Generals departed Flint, they were replaced by the Flint Spirits.

== Championships ==
Year	League	Trophy
1983–1984	IHL	Turner Cup

== Standings ==
Year	GP	W	L	T	PTS	GF	GA	Pct	Standings	Playoffs
1969–1970	72	21	39	12	54	218	270	.375	8 of 8	Did not qualify
1970–1971	72	33	32	7	73	247	224	.507	4 of 7	Lost quarterfinals Dayton Gems 4-3
1971–1972	72	31	36	5	67	253	259	.465	6 of 8	Lost quarterfinals Port Huron Flags 3-1
1972–1973	74	44	29	1	89	347	281	.601	3 of 10	Lost semifinals Fort Wayne Komets 4-1
1973–1974	76	30	43	3	63	251	288	.414	7 of 9	Won quarterfinals Toledo Hornets 2-1, lost semifinals Des Moines Capitols 4-0
1974–1975	75	44	26	5	93	287	220	.620	3 of 11	Lost quarterfinals Saginaw Gears 4-1
1975–1976	78	34	30	14	82	285	254	.526	4 of 9	Lost quarterfinals Port Huron Flags 4-0
1976–1977	78	35	33	10	80	342	306	.513	4 of 9	Lost quarterfinals Kalamazoo Wings 4-1
1977–1978	80	36	34	10	82	364	381	.513	5 of 9	Lost quarterfinals Kalamazoo Wings 4-1
1978–1979	80	35	40	5	75	356	349	.469	7 of 9	Won quarterfinals Port Huron Flags 4-3, lost semifinals Kalamazoo Wings 4-0
1979–1980	80	35	32	13	83	298	316	.519	5 of 10	Lost quarterfinals Port Huron Flags 4-1
1980–1981	82	32	42	8	72	324	363	.439	6 of 8	Won quarterfinals Muskegon Mohawks 2-1, lost semifinals Kalamazoo Wings 4-0
1981–1982	82	32	45	5	74	310	353	.421	6 of 7	Lost quarterfinals Toledo Goaldiggers 4-0
1982–1983	82	35	36	11	82	317	340	.494	4 of 8	Lost quarterfinals Fort Wayne Komets 3-2
1983–1984	82	41	32	9	93	375	319	.555	3 of 7	Won semifinals Milwaukee Admirals 4-0, won Turner Cup Finals Toledo Goaldiggers 4-0
1984–1985	82	43	35	4	93	349	340	.549	3 of 9	Lost quarterfinals Kalamazoo Wings 4-3
Totals	1,247	561	564	122	1,255	4,823	4,863	.499		

== Notable players ==
Jim Aldred played for the Generals in the 1984–85 IHL season, and later became coach of the Portugal men's national ice hockey team.

List of Generals to play in the National Hockey League:

- Doug Rombough
- Rick Knickle
- Ted Bulley
- Kirk Bowman
- Pierre Giroux
- Gilles Meloche
