= Des Moines Oak Leafs =

- City: Des Moines, Iowa
- League: International Hockey League
- Division: Southern
- Operated: 1961–72
- Home arena: Des Moines Ice Arena
- Colors: Green, Gold, White

Franchise history
- 1958–1961: Des Moines Ice Hawks
- 1961–1972: Des Moines Oak Leafs
- 1972–1975: Des Moines Capitols

The Des Moines Oak Leafs were a minor league professional ice hockey team from Des Moines, Iowa, playing at Des Moines Ice Arena. The Oak Leafs were members of the United States Hockey League from 1961 to 1963, and the International Hockey League from 1963 to 1972. After 1972, the team was renamed the Des Moines Capitols.
