= Dayton Gems =

Ice hockey team in Ohio, United States

Original Dayton Gems team logo from 1968

The Dayton Gems were a minor league ice hockey team based in Dayton, Ohio, and members of the International Hockey League from 1964 to 1977, and 1979–1980.

The Gems were an expansion team assembled from various cast-offs and young players looking for their first break in minor league hockey. The team began play in 1964 in the new Hara Arena.

Dayton was the host for several IHL all-star games due to the large attendance in their 5,500 seat arena. The Gems played exhibition games against the US Olympic team as well as the Oklahoma City Blazers of the Central Hockey League. The team had a few games a season televised locally as well as all games broadcast on the premier AM radio station in town.

Other teams in the league copied the uniform styling of the Gems. The Dayton Gems were the first adult team in North America to make helmets mandatory, long before the NHL adopted them.

== Team history ==
Local businessman Edgar “Lefty” McFadden provided the financial base for the team and acquired the team franchise for the International Hockey League. The Gems, taken from the nickname for Dayton, Ohio, the Gem City, were affiliated with the Boston Bruins for several years. The Bruins provided some of the players and the trainer for the team. In the 1970s, the Gems became an affiliate for the Washington Capitals.

After winning the Turner Cup two years in a row in 1968–69 and 1969–70, McFadden was selected as the minor league executive of the year. He then moved to Washington to assist the Capitals. The Gems struggled on and off the ice for the next few years as attendance decreased from 5,000 to 1,000 a game. The 1970s downturn in the economy, especially the auto industry, reduced disposable income in the community and negatively impacted attendance.

The Gems recovered to win their final Turner Cup in 1976. Their red, white and blue uniforms with the crest of a hockey player superimposed over a diamond, are on exhibit at the Hockey Hall of Fame in Toronto. The Gems went into dormancy after the 1976–77 season, and were resurrected for the 1979–80 season. The revived Gems lasted only one season before ceasing operations for good.

== Gems players and coaches from the NHL ==
- Jim Anderson
- Larry Mickey
- Larry Wilson (ice hockey)
- Bob Bailey
- Paul Nicholson
- John Brenneman

== Gems players in the NHL/WHA ==
A few players/coaches were able to make the sizeable jump to National Hockey League (NHL) teams.

- Gerry Moore
- Tom McVie
- Rick Bragnalo
- Michel Rouleau in the WHA
- Curt Ridley
- Bill Horton in the WHA
- Jim Bédard
- Doug Patey
- Frank Golembrosky in the WHA
- Gord Lane played for the Capitals and the New York Islanders.
- Tony White played several seasons as a wing with the Capitals.
- Michel Dumas was Tony Esposito's back-up in goal for the Chicago Black Hawks for a few years.
- Dave Forbes was a forward who played for the Bruins and Capitals as well as a season with the Cincinnati Stingers of the World Hockey Association (WHA).
- Guy Trottier, "the little French-Canadian with the big shot" played for the Michigan Stags, Baltimore Blades, Ottawa Nationals, and Toronto Toros of the World Hockey Association and the Toronto Maple Leafs and New York Rangers of the National Hockey League.
- Stan Jonathan played for the Boston Bruins and Pittsburgh Penguins of the NHL.
- Pat Rupp was a goaltender on the 1964 and 1968 US Olympic hockey teams, but declined to sign an NHL contract, wanting to stay in Dayton. He played one game for the Detroit Red Wings in 1963–1964.
