= Muskegon Mohawks =

- City: Muskegon
- League: International Hockey League
- Operated: 1965–1984
- Home arena: L. C. Walker Arena
- Affiliates: New York Islanders

Franchise history
- 1960–1965: Muskegon Zephyrs
- 1965–1984: Muskegon Mohawks
- 1984–1992: Muskegon Lumberjacks
- 1992–2001: Cleveland Lumberjacks

Championships
- Turner Cups: 1 (1968)

The Muskegon Mohawks were a minor league professional ice hockey team in the International Hockey League from 1965 to 1984. Muskegon were Turner Cup champions in 1968.

This team was originally named the Muskegon Zephyrs. After the completion of the 1983–84 season, the team was again renamed, this time becoming the Muskegon Lumberjacks.

== Season-by-season results ==
Season	Games	Won	Lost	Tied	Points	Goals for	Goals against	Coach
1965–66	70	46	19	5	97	376	314	Moose Lallo
1966–67	72	27	43	2	56	262	299	Moose Lallo
1967–68	72	43	17	12	98	305	216	Moose Lallo
1968–69	72	34	29	9	77	332	287	Moose Lallo
1969–70	72	46	18	8	100	356	271	Moose Lallo
1970–71	72	43	24	5	91	300	212	Moose Lallo
1971–72	72	49	21	2	100	328	231	Moose Lallo
1972–73	74	36	34	4	76	302	259	Bryan McLay^{†} Moose Lallo^{‡}
1973–74	76	44	26	6	94	272	234	Moose Lallo
1974–75	75	48	24	3	99	325	240	Moose Lallo
1975–76	78	34	31	13	81	260	238	Moose Lallo
1976–77	78	31	36	11	73	294	322	Bryan McLay^{†} Moose Lallo^{‡}
1977–78	80	27	42	11	65	290	322	Bryan McLay^{†} Moose Lallo^{‡} Gerry Moore^{‡}
1978–79	80	15	58	7	37	275	475	Gerry Moore
1979–80	80	29	43	8	66	317	330	Gerry Moore
1980–81	82	28	45	9	65	274	351	Gerry Moore^{†} Ted Garvin^{‡}
1981–82	82	30	49	3	64	319	411	Poul Popiel^{†} Gerry Moore^{‡}
1982–83	82	29	41	12	71	335	354	Doug McKay
1983–84	82	19	58	5	46	282	435	Doug McKay

† indicates replaced mid-season
‡ indicates replacement
