= Port Huron Flags =

Former professional minor league ice hockey team in Port Huron, Michigan

- City: Port Huron, Michigan
- League: International Hockey League
- Operated: 1962–1981
- Home arena: McMorran Arena
- Affiliates: Detroit Red Wings (1971–1974)

Franchise history
- 1962–1971: Port Huron Flags
- 1971–1974: Port Huron Wings
- 1974–1981: Port Huron Flags

Championships
- Regular season titles: 2 (1965, 1979)
- Division titles: 2 (1965, 1979)
- Turner Cups: 3 (1966, 1971, 1972)

The Port Huron Flags were a minor league professional ice hockey team located in Port Huron, Michigan. The Flags competed in the International Hockey League between 1962 and 1981. For three of those seasons from 1971 to 1974, Port Huron was a farm team of the Detroit Red Wings, and were known as the Port Huron Wings. Port Huron won the International Hockey League playoff title, known as the Turner Cup, in 1966, 1971, and 1972.

== Season-by-season results ==
- Port Huron Flags, 1962–1971 and 1974–1981
- Port Huron Wings, 1971–1974

Season	Games	Won	Lost	Tied	Points	Winning Pct. %	Goals for	Goals against	Standing
1962–63	70	28	36	6	62	0.443	246	273	5th, IHL
1963–64	70	37	31	2	76	0.543	279	279	3rd, IHL
1964–65	70	43	22	5	91	0.650	336	258	1st, IHL
1965–66	70	34	32	4	72	0.514	308	274	3rd, IHL
1966–67	72	34	33	5	73	0.507	314	300	5th, IHL
1967–68	72	25	36	11	61	0.424	269	343	6th, IHL
1968–69	72	28	30	14	70	0.486	285	289	4th, IHL
1969–70	72	37	28	7	81	0.562	272	270	2nd, North
1970–71	72	25	36	11	61	0.424	248	292	6th, IHL
1971–72	72	37	31	4	78	0.542	276	262	2nd, North
1972–73	73	41	31	1	83	0.568	266	237	2nd, North
1973–74	76	29	44	3	61	0.401	229	268	5th, North
1974–75	76	35	38	3	73	0.480	255	270	4th, North
1975–76	78	36	31	11	83	0.532	304	291	2nd, North
1976–77	78	27	43	8	62	0.397	268	328	5th, North
1977–78	80	33	32	15	81	0.506	322	331	4th, North
1978–79	80	44	29	7	95	0.594	393	292	1st, North
1979–80	80	38	26	16	92	0.575	352	300	3rd, North
1980–81	82	31	35	16	78	0.476	337	377	2nd, East
