= Turner Cup =

Ice hockey award

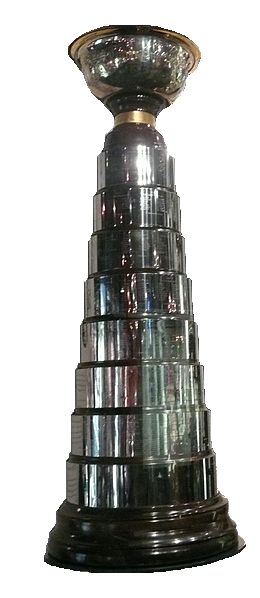
- Sport: Ice hockey
- Competition: Turner Cup Playoffs
- Awarded for: Playoff champion of the International Hockey League

History
- First award: 1946
- Final award: 2010
- First winner: Detroit Auto Club
- Most wins: Fort Wayne Komets
- Most recent: Fort Wayne Komets

The Turner Cup was the championship trophy of the International Hockey League from 1945 to 2001 and the renamed United Hockey League from 2007 to 2010. The Cup was named for Joe Turner, a goaltender from Windsor, Ontario. Turner became professional with the Detroit Red Wings organization, and played one season with the Indianapolis Capitals in the American Hockey League. Turner was killed in Belgium during World War II, while serving with the United States Army.

It was the championship trophy to the incarnation of the IHL that existed from 1945 to 2001 before it was retired to the Hockey Hall of Fame. In July 2007, the United Hockey League officially changed its name to "International Hockey League". The new IHL put forth a request to the Hockey Hall of Fame to take a controlling interest in the Turner Cup. The name Turner Cup was restored on September 24, 2007 as a tribute to the original IHL. When the incarnation of the IHL that existed from 2007 to 2010 folded, the Cup was retired again and looked to be put back in the Hockey Hall of Fame.

== Champions and finalists ==
| Season | Champion | Finalist | Games |
|---|---|---|---|
| 1946 | Detroit Auto Club | Detroit Bright's Goodyears | 2-1 |
| 1947 | Windsor Spitfires | Detroit Bright's Goodyears | 3-0 |
| 1948 | Toledo Mercurys | Windsor Hettche Spitfires | 4-1 |
| 1949 | Windsor Hettche Spitfires | Toledo Mercurys | 4-3 |
| 1950 | Chatham Maroons | Sarnia Sailors | 4-3 |
| 1951 | Toledo Mercurys | Grand Rapids Rockets | 4-1 |
| 1952 | Toledo Mercurys | Grand Rapids Rockets | 4-2 |
| 1953 | Cincinnati Mohawks | Grand Rapids Rockets | 4-0 |
| 1954 | Cincinnati Mohawks | Johnstown Jets | 4-2 |
| 1955 | Cincinnati Mohawks | Troy Bruins | 4-3 |
| 1956 | Cincinnati Mohawks | Toledo-Marion Mercurys | 4-0 |
| 1957 | Cincinnati Mohawks | Indianapolis Chiefs | 3-0 |
| 1958 | Indianapolis Chiefs | Louisville Rebels | 4-3 |
| 1959 | Louisville Rebels | Fort Wayne Komets | 4-2 |
| 1960 | St. Paul Saints | Fort Wayne Komets | 4-3 |
| 1961 | St. Paul Saints | Muskegon Zephyrs | 4-1 |
| 1962 | Muskegon Zephyrs | St. Paul Saints | 4-0 |
| 1963 | Fort Wayne Komets | Minneapolis Millers | 4-1 |
| 1964 | Toledo Blades | Fort Wayne Komets | 4-2 |
| 1965 | Fort Wayne Komets | Des Moines Oak Leafs | 4-2 |
| 1966 | Port Huron Flags | Dayton Gems | 4-1 |
| 1967 | Toledo Blades | Fort Wayne Komets | 4-2 |
| 1968 | Muskegon Mohawks | Dayton Gems | 4-1 |
| 1969 | Dayton Gems | Muskegon Mohawks | 3-0 |
| 1970 | Dayton Gems | Port Huron Flags | 4-3 |
| 1971 | Port Huron Flags | Des Moines Oak Leafs | 4-2 |
| 1972 | Port Huron Wings | Muskegon Mohawks | 4-2 |
| 1973 | Fort Wayne Komets | Port Huron Wings | 4-2 |
| 1974 | Des Moines Capitols | Saginaw Gears | 4-2 |
| 1975 | Toledo Goaldiggers | Saginaw Gears | 4-3 |
| 1976 | Dayton Gems | Port Huron Flags | 4-0 |
| 1977 | Saginaw Gears | Toledo Goaldiggers | 4-3 |
| 1978 | Toledo Goaldiggers | Port Huron Flags | 4-3 |
| 1979 | Kalamazoo Wings | Grand Rapids Owls | 4-3 |
| 1980 | Kalamazoo Wings | Fort Wayne Komets | 4-2 |
| 1981 | Saginaw Gears | Kalamazoo Wings | 4-0 |
| 1982 | Toledo Goaldiggers | Saginaw Gears | 4-1 |
| 1983 | Toledo Goaldiggers | Milwaukee Admirals | 4-2 |
| 1984 | Flint Generals | Toledo Goaldiggers | 4-0 |
| 1985 | Peoria Rivermen | Muskegon Lumberjacks | 4-3 |
| 1986 | Muskegon Lumberjacks | Fort Wayne Komets | 4-0 |
| 1987 | Salt Lake Golden Eagles | Muskegon Lumberjacks | 4-2 |
| 1988 | Salt Lake Golden Eagles | Flint Spirits | 4-2 |
| 1989 | Muskegon Lumberjacks | Salt Lake Golden Eagles | 4-1 |
| 1990 | Indianapolis Ice | Muskegon Lumberjacks | 4-0 |
| 1991 | Peoria Rivermen | Fort Wayne Komets | 4-2 |
| 1992 | Kansas City Blades | Muskegon Lumberjacks | 4-0 |
| 1993 | Fort Wayne Komets | San Diego Gulls | 4-0 |
| 1994 | Atlanta Knights | Fort Wayne Komets | 4-2 |
| 1995 | Denver Grizzlies | Kansas City Blades | 4-0 |
| 1996 | Utah Grizzlies | Orlando Solar Bears | 4-0 |
| 1997 | Detroit Vipers | Long Beach Ice Dogs | 4-2 |
| 1998 | Chicago Wolves | Detroit Vipers | 4-3 |
| 1999 | Houston Aeros | Orlando Solar Bears | 4-3 |
| 2000 | Chicago Wolves | Grand Rapids Griffins | 4-2 |
| 2001 | Orlando Solar Bears | Chicago Wolves | 4-1 |
| 2002–07 | Cup not awarded | | |
| 2008 | Fort Wayne Komets | Port Huron IceHawks | 4-3 |
| 2009 | Fort Wayne Komets | Muskegon Lumberjacks | 4-1 |
| 2010 | Fort Wayne Komets | Flint Generals | 4-1 |

== Championships by franchise ==
| Total | Franchise (teams) | Season(s) |
|---|---|---|
| 9 | Toledo Mercurys (3) /Blades (2) /Goaldiggers (4) | 1948, 1951, 1952, 1964, 1967, 1975, 1978, 1982, 1983 |
| 7 | Fort Wayne Komets | 1963, 1965, 1973, 1993, 2008, 2009, 2010 |
| 5 | Cincinnati Mohawks | 1953, 1954, 1955, 1956, 1957 |
| 4 | Muskegon Zephyrs (1) / Mohawks (1) / Lumberjacks (2) | 1962, 1968, 1986, 1989 |
| 3 | Port Huron Flags (2) / Wings (1) | 1966, 1971, 1972 |
| 3 | Dayton Gems | 1969, 1970, 1976 |
| 3 | Salt Lake Golden Eagles (2) / Detroit Vipers (1) | 1987, 1988, 1997 |
| 2 | Windsor (Hettche) Spitfires | 1947, 1949 |
| 2 | St. Paul Saints | 1960, 1961 |
| 2 | Saginaw Gears | 1977, 1981 |
| 2 | Kalamazoo Wings | 1979, 1980 |
| 2 | Peoria Rivermen | 1985, 1991 |
| 2 | Denver / Utah Grizzlies | 1995, 1996 |
| 2 | Chicago Wolves | 1998, 2000 |
| 1 | Detroit Auto Club | 1946 |
| 1 | Chatham Maroons | 1950 |
| 1 | Indianapolis Chiefs | 1958 |
| 1 | Louisville Rebels | 1959 |
| 1 | Des Moines Capitols | 1974 |
| 1 | Flint Generals | 1984 |
| 1 | Indianapolis Ice | 1990 |
| 1 | Kansas City Blades | 1992 |
| 1 | Atlanta Knights | 1994 |
| 1 | Houston Aeros | 1999 |
| 1 | Orlando Solar Bears | 2001 |
