= Bill Mitchell (ice hockey) =

Canadian ice hockey player

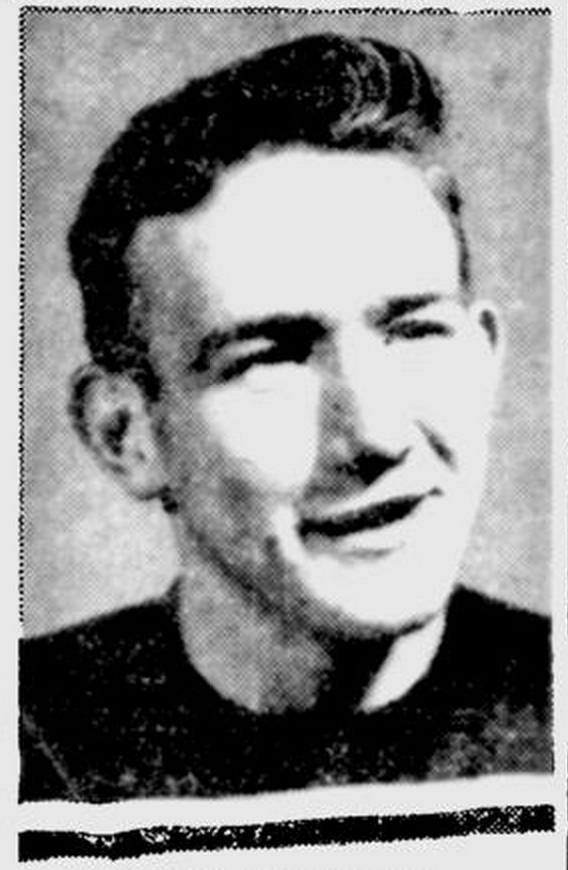
- Billy Mitchell pictured with the Stratford Kroehlers circa 1946
- Born: February 22, 1930 Port Dalhousie, Ontario, Canada
- Died: April 1, 2014 (aged 84) Toledo, Ohio, U.S.
- Height: 6 ft 0 in (183 cm)
- Weight: 180 lb (82 kg; 12 st 12 lb)
- Position: Defence
- Shot: Left
- Played for: Detroit Red Wings
- National team: Canada
- Playing career: 1948–1973

William Richard Mitchell (February 22, 1930 – April 1, 2014) was a Canadian professional ice hockey defencemen. He played in one National Hockey League game for the Detroit Red Wings during the 1963–64 NHL season, on February 23, 1964 against the Montreal Canadiens. The rest of his career, which lasted from 1948 to 1973 and was spent in various minor leagues. He also played for the Canadian national team, winning a silver medal at the 1962 World Championships. He died at a hospice in Toledo, Ohio in 2014, of kidney failure.

== Coaching ==
Bill Mitchell started his coaching career with the University of Toledo hockey team in 1966 where they were the 1967 Midwest Collegiate Hockey Association Champions.

== Career statistics ==
=== Regular season and playoffs ===
			Regular season					Playoffs
Season	Team	League	GP	G	A	Pts	PIM	GP	G	A	Pts	PIM
1946–47	Stratford Kroehlers	OHA	27	5	12	17	16	2	0	1	1	2
1947–48	Stratford Kroehlers	OHA	34	4	10	14	41	2	0	1	1	0
1947–48	Kitchener-Waterloo Dutchmen	OHA Sr	2	1	0	1	0	—	—	—	—	—
1948–49	Stratford Kroehlers	OHA	36	7	10	17	27	3	1	0	1	0
1949–50	Toronto Marlboros	OHA	46	7	12	19	46	5	2	0	2	4
1950–51	Halifax St. Mary's	MMHL	3	0	0	0	0	—	—	—	—	—
1950–51	Moncton Hawks	MMHL	1	0	0	0	0	—	—	—	—	—
1950–51	Kitchener-Waterloo Dutchmen	OHA Sr	32	6	9	15	27	—	—	—	—	—
1951–52	Kitchener-Waterloo Dutchmen	OHA Sr	47	18	20	38	40	5	0	1	1	4
1952–53	Kitchener-Waterloo Dutchmen	OHA Sr	24	14	8	22	18	—	—	—	—	—
1952–53	Toledo Mercurys	IHL	15	3	9	12	4	5	1	1	2	10
1953–54	Toledo Mercurys	IHL	63	15	15	30	57	5	0	3	3	8
1954–55	Toledo Mercurys	IHL	60	18	30	48	55	3	1	1	2	4
1955–56	Toledo Mercurys	IHL	58	17	30	47	63	9	1	4	5	18
1956–57	Toledo Mercurys	IHL	60	12	31	43	46	5	3	3	6	6
1957–58	Toledo Mercurys	IHL	61	13	39	52	43	—	—	—	—	—
1958–59	Toledo Mercurys	IHL	60	12	33	45	50	—	—	—	—	—
1958–59	Fort Wayne Komets	IHL	—	—	—	—	—	11	2	4	6	8
1959–60	Toledo Mercurys	IHL	55	11	26	37	34	—	—	—	—	—
1960–61	Chatham Maroons	OHA Sr	—	16	40	56	26	—	—	—	—	—
1961–62	Galt Terriers	OHA Sr	—	—	—	—	—	—	—	—	—	—
1961–62	Windsor Bulldogs	OHA Sr	30	6	31	37	22	7	2	2	4	8
1961–62	Toledo Mercurys	IHL	2	0	0	0	2	—	—	—	—	—
1962–63	Windsor Bulldogs	OHA Sr	43	1	23	24	14	8	1	2	3	8
1962–63	Windsor Bulldogs	Al-Cup	—	—	—	—	—	13	4	5	9	6
1963–64	Windsor Bulldogs	IHL	67	9	33	42	26	6	1	3	4	4
1963–64	Detroit Red Wings	NHL	1	0	0	0	0	—	—	—	—	—
1963–64	Cincinnati Wings	CHL	2	0	0	0	0	—	—	—	—	—
1964–65	Toledo Blades	IHL	48	5	21	26	42	4	0	1	1	2
1965–66	Fox Valley Astros	USHL	30	9	15	24	22	—	—	—	—	—
1966–67	Toledo Blades	IHL	7	0	3	3	2	—	—	—	—	—
1967–68	Toledo Blades	IHL	39	4	12	16	26	—	—	—	—	—
1969–70	Toledo Blades	IHL	—	—	—	—	—	7	2	2	4	8
1970–71	Toledo Hornets	IHL	2	0	0	0	2	—	—	—	—	—
1972–73	Clinton Comets	EHL	3	0	1	1	6	—	—	—	—	—
IHL totals			597	119	282	401	442	55	11	22	33	68
NHL totals			1	0	0	0	0	—	—	—	—	—

=== International ===
Year	Team	Event	GP	G	A	Pts	PIM
1962	Canada	WC	6	0	1	1	22
Senior totals			6	0	1	1	22

=== Coaching ===
Team	Year	League	Regular Season								Post Season
Team	Year	League	G	W	L	T	OTL	SOL	Pts	Finish	Result
University of Toledo	1966–67	MCHA	23	22	1	0	0	0	44	MCHA Champions	MCHA Tournament Champions
Toledo Blades	1969–70	IHL	72	32	33	7	0	0	71	NA	Lost in 1st round
Toledo Hornets	1970–71	IHL	72	17	44	11	0	0	45	NA	Did not qualify
8.5
Total	1966-71		167	71	78	18	0	0	-	-	-

== See also ==
- List of players who played only one game in the NHL
