= Len Wharton =

Canadian ice hockey player

- Born: December 13, 1927 Winnipeg, Manitoba, Canada
- Died: September 30, 2007 (aged 79) Hot Springs, Arkansas, U.S.
- Height: 6 ft 0 in (183 cm)
- Weight: 170 lb (77 kg; 12 st 2 lb)
- Position: Defence
- Shot: Left
- Played for: New York Rangers
- Playing career: 1944–1954

Leonard Thomas Wharton (December 13, 1927 – September 30, 2007) was a Canadian professional ice hockey defenceman who played in one National Hockey League game for the New York Rangers during the 1944–45 season, on March 4, 1945, against the Toronto Maple Leafs. The rest of his career, which lasted from 1944 to 1954, was spent in the minor leagues.

== Career statistics ==
=== Regular season and playoffs ===
			Regular season					Playoffs
Season	Team	League	GP	G	A	Pts	PIM	GP	G	A	Pts	PIM
1944–45	New York Rangers	NHL	1	0	0	0	0	—	—	—	—	—
1944–45	New York Rovers	EAHL	39	9	12	21	8	12	0	2	2	18
1945–46	New York Rovers	EAHL	36	3	9	12	26	9	0	0	0	2
1946–47	Stratford Kroehlers	OHA	18	7	5	12	38	—	—	—	—	—
1947–48	San Diego Skyhawks	PCHL	47	11	15	26	18	—	—	—	—	—
1948–49	Louisville Blades	IHL	28	4	14	18	102	6	0	0	0	23
1949–50	Toledo Buckeyes	EAHL	45	2	11	13	151	7	1	1	2	20
1950–51	Toledo Mercurys	IHL	53	6	19	25	186	21	1	8	9	28
1951–52	Toledo Mercurys	IHL	44	2	15	17	148	10	1	3	4	10
1952–53	Fort Wayne Komets	IHL	59	5	24	29	77	—	—	—	—	—
1953–54	Fort Wayne Komets	IHL	52	1	10	11	84	2	0	1	1	16
IHL totals			236	18	82	100	597	39	2	12	14	77
NHL totals			1	0	0	0	0	—	—	—	—	—

== See also ==
- List of players who played only one game in the NHL
