= Carl Liscombe =

Canadian ice hockey player

- Born: May 17, 1914 Perth, Ontario, Canada
- Died: February 24, 2004 (aged 89) Wailuku, Hawaii, U.S.
- Height: 5 ft 8 in (173 cm)
- Weight: 175 lb (79 kg; 12 st 7 lb)
- Position: Left wing
- Shot: Left
- Played for: Detroit Red Wings
- Playing career: 1935–1954

Harry Carlyle Liscombe (May 17, 1914 – February 24, 2004) was a Canadian ice hockey player. He played in the National Hockey League with the Detroit Red Wings between 1937 and 1946. With Detroit he won the Stanley Cup in 1943. He also won the Calder Cup with the Providence Reds of the American Hockey League in 1949. Liscombe was the last surviving member of Red Wings 1943 Stanley Cup team.

== Playing career ==
Liscombe was a key member of the 1943 Stanley Cup champions. After scoring 42 points during the regular season, he tied a league record with 14 points in the playoffs. He scored the last goal of the 1943 Stanley Cup Final.

After co-leading the NHL across two playoff seasons with 26 points (12 points in 1942 and 14 points in 1943), Liscombe scored a career-high 73 points in 50 games during the 1943-44 regular season (fourth-best in the league scoring race).

Liscombe shares the team record for most goals in a playoff game and most points in a game.

Liscombe was also a star in the American Hockey League, notably becoming the first back-to-back winner of the Les Cunningham Award as the league's Most Valuable Player. In 1949, Liscombe helped the Providence Reds win the Calder Cup.

Liscombe died of complications from leukemia.

== Career statistics ==
=== Regular season and playoffs ===
			Regular season					Playoffs
Season	Team	League	GP	G	A	Pts	PIM	GP	G	A	Pts	PIM
1933–34	Galt Terriers	OHA-B	13	6	1	7	20	2	1	0	1	8
1934–35	Hamilton Tigers	OHA	19	22	6	28	20	6	1	0	1	2
1935–36	Detroit Olympics	IHL	47	12	8	20	37	6	1	1	2	4
1936–37	Pittsburgh Hornets	IAHL	48	8	13	21	23	5	0	1	1	2
1937–38	Detroit Red Wings	NHL	41	14	10	24	30	—	—	—	—	—
1937–38	Pittsburgh Hornets	IAHL	5	3	1	4	17	—	—	—	—	—
1938–39	Detroit Red Wings	NHL	48	8	18	26	13	3	0	0	0	2
1939–40	Detroit Red Wings	NHL	25	2	7	9	4	—	—	—	—	—
1939–40	Indianapolis Capitals	IAHL	24	8	11	19	9	5	2	1	3	2
1940–41	Detroit Red Wings	NHL	33	10	10	20	0	9	4	3	7	12
1940–41	Indianapolis Capitals	AHL	19	4	5	9	7	—	—	—	—	—
1941–42	Detroit Red Wings	NHL	47	13	17	30	14	12	6	6	12	2
1942–43	Detroit Red Wings	NHL	50	19	23	42	19	10	6	8	14	2
1943–44	Detroit Red Wings	NHL	50	36	37	73	17	5	1	0	1	2
1944–45	Detroit Red Wings	NHL	42	23	9	32	18	14	4	2	6	0
1945–46	Detroit Red Wings	NHL	44	12	9	21	2	4	1	0	1	0
1946–47	St. Louis Flyers	AHL	37	16	10	26	12	—	—	—	—	—
1946–47	Providence Reds	AHL	26	19	22	41	4	—	—	—	—	—
1947–48	Providence Reds	AHL	68	50	68	118	10	5	1	1	2	2
1948–49	Providence Reds	AHL	68	55	47	102	2	14	3	2	5	2
1949–50	Providence Reds	AHL	57	13	29	42	16	3	0	0	0	0
1950–51	Hamilton Tigers	OHA Sr	4	0	0	0	0	3	1	0	1	0
1950–51	Detroit Auto Club	IHL	45	29	23	52	9	3	1	0	1	0
1951–52	Detroit Hettche	IHL	45	35	31	66	14	—	—	—	—	—
1952–53	Chatham Maroons	OHA Sr	14	4	7	11	2	—	—	—	—	—
1953–54	Chatham Maroons	OHA Sr	12	0	0	0	4	—	—	—	—	—
1953–54	Hamilton Tigers	OHA Sr	52	12	19	31	47	—	—	—	—	—
NHL totals			380	137	140	277	117	57	22	19	41	20

== Awards and achievements ==
Was winner of two AHL most valuable player awards;

- 1948 Les Cunningham Award winner (Providence)
- 1949 Les Cunningham Award winner (Providence)
