= Bob McDonald (ice hockey) =

Canadian ice hockey player (1923–1977)

- Born: January 4, 1923 Toronto, Ontario, Canada
- Died: October 29, 1977 (aged 54)
- Height: 5 ft 10 in (178 cm)
- Weight: 170 lb (77 kg; 12 st 2 lb)
- Position: Right wing
- Shot: Left
- Played for: New York Rangers
- Playing career: 1943–1949

Robert Daniel McDonald (January 4, 1923 – October 29, 1977) was a Canadian professional ice hockey right winger who played in one National Hockey League game for the New York Rangers during the 1943–44 season, on January 6, 1944 against the Detroit Red Wings. The rest of his career, which lasted from 1943 to 1949, was spent in the minor leagues. He was born in Toronto, Ontario.

== Career statistics ==
=== Regular season and playoffs ===
			Regular season					Playoffs
Season	Team	League	GP	G	A	Pts	PIM	GP	G	A	Pts	PIM
1941–42	St. James Canadians	MJHL	18	23	14	37	34	6	10	0	10	8
1941–42	Detroit Mansfiels	MOHL	2	1	1	2	0	—	—	—	—	—
1942–43	Windsor Army	WNDL	11	8	10	18	10	3	1	0	1	2
1943–44	New York Rangers	NHL	1	0	0	0	0	—	—	—	—	—
1943–44	New York Rovers	EAHL	41	15	36	51	12	11	5	8	13	0
1944–45	New York Rovers	EAHL	42	13	21	34	14	12	4	9	13	0
1945–46	Windsor Gotfredsons	IHL	15	10	25	35	10	2	0	1	1	0
1946–47	Detroit Auto Club	IHL	27	21	26	47	38	11	0	3	3	9
1947–48	Detroit Bright's Goodyears	IHL	27	14	11	25	4	2	0	1	1	4
1948–49	Detroit Brights Goodyears	IHL	18	0	4	4	0	—	—	—	—	—
EAHL totals			83	28	57	85	26	23	9	17	26	0
IHL totals			87	45	66	111	52	4	0	2	2	4
NHL totals			1	0	0	0	0	—	—	—	—	—

== See also ==
- List of players who played only one game in the NHL
