= Bob Schiller (ice hockey) =

Canadian ice hockey player (born 1933)

- Born: July 15, 1933 (age 93) Windsor, Ontario, Canada
- Height: 6 ft 0 in (183 cm)
- Weight: 185 lb (84 kg; 13 st 3 lb)
- Position: Defenseman
- Shot: Right
- Played for: Toronto St. Michael's Majors; Michigan; Toledo Mercurys
- Playing career: 1954–1959

Robert Schiller (born July 15, 1933) is a Canadian retired ice hockey defenseman who won back-to-back National Championships for Michigan in the 1950s.

== Career ==
Schiller was one of many Ontario-natives to be recruited by Vic Heyliger and helped to continue Michigan's 10-year run as an NCAA superpower. When he made the varsity team as a sophomore, Schiller helped the Wolverines establish themselves as one of the top defensive teams in the country and reach the NCAA tournament. Schiller was one of three Wolverines to earn AHCA Second Team All-American honors that year. In the tournament Schiller earned only a single assist but his defensive work earned him a spot on the All-Tournament Second Team.

In his junior season the Michigan defense was nearly impenetrable and Schiller was again named an All-American. In their march towards a sixth championship Michigan needed all the defensive work they could summon in the semifinal. Despite a furious effort, St. Lawrence was held to a single goal in their overtime win. The Wolverine offense showed up in the final, scoring 7 goals against Michigan Tech, including one from Schiller, and the team captured its second consecutive title. In his senior season Michigan again reached the championship game, however, the team could not restrain the dominating offense from Colorado College and lost 6–13, the highest-scoring championship game in history (as of 2020).

After graduating with a degree in Aeronautical and Aerospace Engineering, Schiller played two seasons for the Toledo Mercurys while earning his MBA.

== Statistics ==
=== Regular season and playoffs ===
			Regular season					Playoffs
Season	Team	League	GP	G	A	Pts	PIM	GP	G	A	Pts	PIM
1949–50	Detroit Hettche	IHL	6	0	1	1	0	—	—	—	—	—
1950–51	Toronto St. Michael's Majors	OHA	—	—	—	—	—	—	—	—	—	—
1951–52	Toronto St. Michael's Majors	OHA	51	4	18	22	0	—	—	—	—	—
1954–55	Michigan	WIHL	—	—	—	—	—	—	—	—	—	—
1955–56	Michigan	WIHL	—	—	—	—	—	—	—	—	—	—
1956–57	Michigan	WIHL	—	—	—	—	—	—	—	—	—	—
1957–58	Toledo Mercurys	IHL	17	1	4	5	8	—	—	—	—	—
1958–59	Toledo Mercurys	IHL	35	3	9	12	8	—	—	—	—	—
NCAA totals			—	—	—	—	—	—	—	—	—	—

== Awards and honors ==
Award	Year
All-WIHL Second Team	1954–55; 1956–57
AHCA Second Team All-American	1954–55
NCAA All-Tournament Second Team	1955, 1957
AHCA First Team All-American	1955–56
NCAA All-Tournament First Team	1956
