= Les Binkley =

Canadian ice hockey player

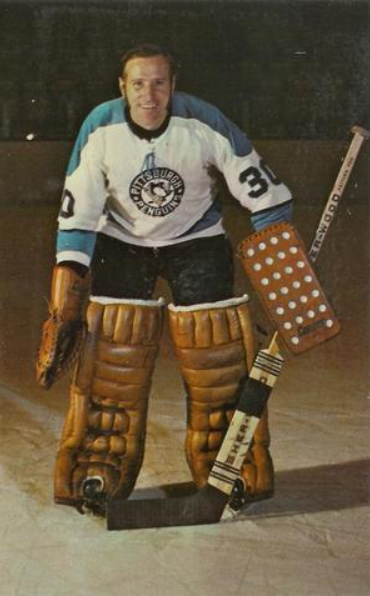
- Binkley in 1971 photo
- Born: June 6, 1934 (age 92) Owen Sound, Ontario, Canada
- Height: 6 ft 0 in (183 cm)
- Weight: 175 lb (79 kg; 12 st 7 lb)
- Position: Goaltender
- Caught: Right
- Played for: Pittsburgh Penguins; Ottawa Nationals; Toronto Toros
- Playing career: 1967–1976

Leslie John Binkley (born June 6, 1934) is a Canadian former professional ice hockey goaltender who played in the National Hockey League (NHL) for the Pittsburgh Penguins and in the World Hockey Association (WHA) for the Ottawa Nationals and Toronto Toros between 1967 and 1976. He later served as a scout for both the Pittsburgh Penguins and Winnipeg Jets.

== Career ==
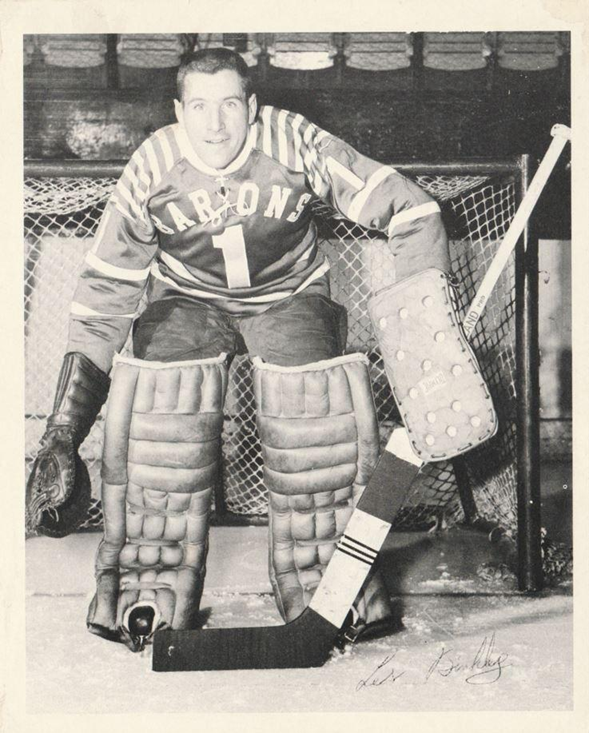
Binkley in 1960-61 trading card for the AHL Cleveland Barons

Binkley spent his early career in the minor leagues and did not play in the NHL until his thirties. After spending the 1960–61 season as the trainer and emergency goalie for the Cleveland Barons of the American Hockey League (AHL), he won the Dudley "Red" Garrett Memorial Award as the AHL's top rookie in 1962 and was awarded the Harry "Hap" Holmes Memorial Award four years later for allowing the fewest goals in the league. Binkley was the starting goaltender for the Pittsburgh Penguins in the team's inaugural season in the NHL. During the 1970 Stanley Cup playoffs, Binkley won five games--the first postseason victories for the Penguin franchise. After five seasons with the Penguins, he played in the WHA with the Ottawa Nationals and Toronto Toros. Binkley played in 196 NHL regular season games and retired with a career GAA of 3.12.

He won two Stanley Cup championships in 1991 and 1992 as a scout for the Pittsburgh Penguins.

== Personal life ==
Binkley currently resides in Walkerton, Ontario. His wife Eleanor died in September 2021. He has two children, Randall and Leslie, five grandchildren, Curtis, Jana, Jonathan, Kara and Jordan and one great-grandchild, Clara. Curtis Binkley is also a goaltender and was drafted by the Guelph Storm of the Ontario Hockey League in 2002.

== Career statistics ==
=== Regular season and playoffs ===
			Regular season									Playoffs
Season	Team	League	GP	W	L	T	MIN	GA	SO	GAA	SV%	GP	W	L	MIN	GA	SO	GAA	SV%
1950–51	Owen Sound Mintos	OHA	—	—	—	—	—	—	—	—	—	1	0	1	60	8	0	8.00	—
1951–52	Galt Black Hawks	OHA	47	31	13	2	2780	178	4	3.84	—	3	0	3	190	16	0	5.05	—
1952–53	Galt Black Hawks	OHA	55	—	—	—	3300	213	1	3.87	—	11	—	—	660	51	0	4.64	—
1953–54	Galt Black Hawks	OHA	54	20	33	1	3240	250	0	4.63	—	—	—	—	—	—	—	—	—
1953–54	Kitchener Greenshirts	OHA	4	2	2	0	240	17	0	4.25	—	4	1	3	240	16	0	4.00	—
1954–55	Kitchener-Waterloo Dutchmen	OHA Sr	3	—	—	—	180	12	0	4.00	—	—	—	—	—	—	—	—	—
1955–56	Fort Wayne Komets	IHL	3	1	2	0	180	13	0	4.33	—	—	—	—	—	—	—	—	—
1955–56	Baltimore Clippers/Charlotte Checkers	EHL	59	21	37	1	3540	302	0	5.11	—	—	—	—	—	—	—	—	—
1956–57	Charlotte Checkers	EHL	64	50	13	1	3840	239	0	3.79	—	13	8	5	780	35	2	2.69	—
1957–58	Charlotte Checkers	EHL	64	38	25	1	3840	237	0	3.70	—	12	5	7	720	46	1	3.83	—
1958–59	Toledo Mercurys	IHL	52	—	—	—	3100	205	1	3.97	—	—	—	—	—	—	—	—	—
1958–59	Cleveland Barons	AHL	1	0	1	0	60	3	0	3.00	—	—	—	—	—	—	—	—	—
1959–60	Toledo-St. Louis Mercurys	IHL	67	28	35	4	4020	294	2	4.39	—	—	—	—	—	—	—	—	—
1960–61	Toledo Mercurys	IHL	1	1	0	0	60	0	1	0.00	1.000	—	—	—	—	—	—	—	—
1960–61	Cleveland Barons	AHL	8	4	1	1	450	11	0	1.47	—	4	0	4	240	18	0	4.50	—
1961–62	Cleveland Barons	AHL	60	31	26	3	3600	181	5	3.02	—	3	1	2	201	10	0	2.99	—
1962–63	Cleveland Barons	AHL	63	28	27	7	3780	203	4	3.22	—	7	4	3	420	22	1	3.14	—
1963–64	Cleveland Barons	AHL	65	34	27	3	3885	180	3	2.77	—	—	—	—	—	—	—	—	—
1964–65	Cleveland Barons	AHL	40	14	23	2	2330	152	0	3.91	—	—	—	—	—	—	—	—	—
1965–66	Cleveland Barons	AHL	66	34	30	2	3932	192	2	2.93	—	12	8	4	696	27	1	2.33	—
1966–67	San Diego Gulls	WHL	55	15	36	2	3200	190	1	3.56	—	—	—	—	—	—	—	—	—
1967–68	Pittsburgh Penguins	NHL	54	20	24	10	3141	151	6	2.88	.905	—	—	—	—	—	—	—	—
1968–69	Pittsburgh Penguins	NHL	50	10	31	8	2885	158	0	3.29	.902	—	—	—	—	—	—	—	—
1969–70	Pittsburgh Penguins	NHL	27	10	13	1	1477	79	3	3.21	.886	7	5	2	429	15	0	2.10	.924
1970–71	Pittsburgh Penguins	NHL	34	11	11	10	1870	89	2	2.86	.900	—	—	—	—	—	—	—	—
1971–72	Pittsburgh Penguins	NHL	31	7	15	5	1673	98	0	3.51	.883	—	—	—	—	—	—	—	—
1972–73	Ottawa Nationals	WHA	30	10	17	1	1709	106	0	3.72	.882	4	1	3	223	17	0	4.57	—
1973–74	Toronto Toros	WHA	27	14	9	1	1412	77	1	3.27	.901	5	2	2	182	17	0	5.60	—
1974–75	Toronto Toros	WHA	17	6	4	0	772	47	0	3.65	.888	1	0	1	59	5	0	5.08	—
1975–76	Toronto Toros	WHA	7	0	6	0	335	32	0	5.73	.849	—	—	—	—	—	—	—	—
1975–76	Buffalo Norsemen	NAHL	24	11	8	0	1195	85	0	4.27	—	—	—	—	—	—	—	—
WHA totals			81	30	36	2	4228	262	1	3.72	.886	10	3	6	464	39	0	5.04	—
NHL totals			196	58	94	34	11,046	575	11	3.12	.898	7	5	2	429	15	0	2.10	.924

== Achievements and awards ==
- EHL Second All-Star Team (1957)
- Dudley "Red" Garrett Memorial Award (Rookie of the Year - AHL) (1962)
- AHL Second All-Star Team (1964, 1966)
- Harry "Hap" Holmes Memorial Award (fewest goals against - AHL) (1966)
- WHL Second All-Star Team (1967)
- Two Stanley Cup championships as a scout for the Pittsburgh Penguins (1991 and 1992)
- First NHL goaltender to wear contact lenses (1967)
- First player signed by the Pittsburgh Penguins club in its first NHL season
