= George Robertson (ice hockey) =

Canadian ice hockey player (1927–2021)

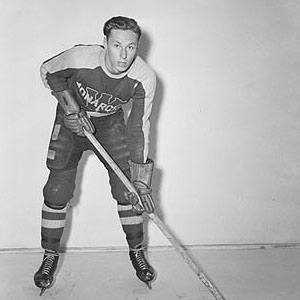
- Robertson with the Winnipeg Monarchs
- Born: May 11, 1927 Winnipeg, Manitoba, Canada
- Died: January 9, 2021 (aged 93) Winnipeg, Manitoba, Canada
- Height: 6 ft 1 in (185 cm)
- Weight: 172 lb (78 kg; 12 st 4 lb)
- Position: Left wing/Center
- Shot: Left
- Played for: Montreal Canadiens
- Playing career: 1947–1956

George Thomas Robertson (11 May 1927 — 9 January 2021) was a Canadian professional ice hockey forward who played 31 games in the National Hockey League (NHL) between 1948 and 1949 for the Montreal Canadiens. The rest of his career, which lasted from 1947 to 1956, was spent in various minor leagues.

He died from COVID-19 in Winnipeg on January 9, 2021, during the COVID-19 pandemic in Manitoba. Robertson contracted the virus after being admitted to St. Boniface Hospital due to a mild stroke.

He was married to his wife Vi, who predeceased him in 1988, and together they had two daughters Susan and Pamela. The family lived on a property along the Red River in East St. Paul, which they built in the 1950s.

== Awards and achievements ==
- Memorial Cup Championship (1946)
- MMHL Second All-Star Team (1954)

== Career statistics ==
=== Regular season and playoffs ===
			Regular season					Playoffs
Season	Team	League	GP	G	A	Pts	PIM	GP	G	A	Pts	PIM
1944–45	Winnipeg Monarchs	MJHL	7	7	6	13	6	6	0	3	3	8
1944–45	Winnipeg Monarchs	M-Cup	—	—	—	—	—	10	4	7	11	12
1945–46	Winnipeg Monarchs	MJHL	9	8	2	10	2	23	17	12	29	24
1945–46	Winnipeg Monarchs	M-Cup	—	—	—	—	—	16	12	7	19	12
1946–47	Stratford Kroehlers	OHA	30	20	27	47	20	2	1	3	4	0
1947–48	Montreal Canadiens	NHL	1	0	0	0	0	—	—	—	—	—
1947–48	Montreal Royals	QSHL	47	11	27	38	18	3	0	0	0	0
1948–49	Montreal Canadiens	NHL	30	2	5	7	6	—	—	—	—	—
1948–49	Buffalo Bisons	AHL	4	0	0	0	0	—	—	—	—	—
1948–49	Washington Lions	AHL	20	4	16	20	2	—	—	—	—	—
1949–50	Cincinnati Mohawks	AHL	26	3	5	8	0	—	—	—	—	—
1949–50	Vancouver Canucks	PCHL	24	1	11	12	6	—	—	—	—	—
1950–51	Springfield Indians	AHL	5	1	3	4	0	—	—	—	—	—
1950–51	Sydney Millionaires	CBMHL	26	12	20	32	25	5	2	2	4	4
1951–52	Sydney Millionaires	MMHL	86	26	44	70	56	—	—	—	—	—
1952–53	Sydney Millionaires	MMHL	74	18	48	66	24	6	1	2	3	0
1953–54	Sydney Millionaires	MMHL	70	32	48	80	30	14	4	2	6	2
1954–55	Saskatoon Quakers	WHL	35	4	15	19	8	—	—	—	—	—
1954–55	Grand Rapids Rockets	IHL	23	7	8	15	4	4	0	0	0	2
1955–56	Sault Ste. Marie Greyhounds	NOHA	60	12	34	46	14	5	1	4	5	0
NHL totals			31	2	5	7	6	—	—	—	—	—
