= Louis Trudel =

American-born Canadian ice hockey player

- Born: July 21, 1912 Salem, Massachusetts, U.S.
- Died: March 19, 1971 (aged 58)
- Height: 5 ft 11 in (180 cm)
- Weight: 167 lb (76 kg; 11 st 13 lb)
- Position: Left wing
- Shot: Left
- Played for: Chicago Black Hawks; Montreal Canadiens
- Playing career: 1932–1954

Armand Louis Napoleon Trudel (July 21, 1912 – March 19, 1971) was an American-born Canadian professional ice hockey player. He played in the National Hockey League with the Chicago Black Hawks and Montreal Canadiens from 1933 to 1941. With Chicago he won the Stanley Cup twice, in 1934 and 1938.

== Early life ==
Trudel was born in Salem, Massachusetts to Canadian parents who had moved there from Montreal. When he was a small child, his family migrated to Edmonton, Alberta where he started to play junior hockey.

== Professional career ==
Lou Trudel played 305 games in the National Hockey League with the Montreal Canadiens and Chicago Black Hawks. Trudel won the Stanley Cup twice with the Chicago Black Hawks, in 1934 and 1938.

== Post-playing career ==
Trudel coached the Milwaukee Chiefs during the 1953–54 season.

== Career statistics ==
=== Regular season and playoffs ===
| | | | Regular season | | | | | Playoffs |
| Season | Team | League | GP | G | A | Pts | PIM | GP | G | A | Pts | PIM |
|---|---|---|---|---|---|---|---|---|---|---|---|---|
| 1929–30 | Edmonton Poolers | EJrHL | 2 | 4 | 0 | 4 | 0 | — | — | — | — | — |
| 1929–30 | Edmonton Poolers | M-Cup | — | — | — | — | — | 2 | 1 | 0 | 1 | 4 |
| 1930–31 | Edmonton Poolers | EJrHL | 13 | 7 | 3 | 10 | 8 | — | — | — | — | — |
| 1931–32 | Edmonton Poolers | EJrHL | 10 | 10 | 1 | 11 | — | 4 | 3 | 0 | 3 | 4 |
| 1931–32 | Edmonton Poolers | M-Cup | — | — | — | — | — | 5 | 4 | 0 | 4 | 12 |
| 1932–33 | St. Paul Greyhounds | AHA | 31 | 10 | 6 | 16 | 19 | 4 | 1 | 0 | 1 | 4 |
| 1933–34 | Chicago Black Hawks | NHL | 34 | 1 | 3 | 4 | 13 | 7 | 0 | 0 | 0 | 0 |
| 1933–34 | Syracuse Stars | IHL | 5 | 0 | 0 | 0 | 2 | — | — | — | — | — |
| 1934–35 | Chicago Black Hawks | NHL | 47 | 12 | 10 | 22 | 28 | 2 | 0 | 0 | 0 | 0 |
| 1935–36 | Chicago Black Hawks | NHL | 47 | 3 | 4 | 7 | 27 | 2 | 0 | 0 | 0 | 2 |
| 1936–37 | Chicago Black Hawks | NHL | 45 | 6 | 12 | 18 | 11 | — | — | — | — | — |
| 1937–38 | Chicago Black Hawks | NHL | 42 | 6 | 16 | 22 | 15 | 10 | 0 | 3 | 3 | 2 |
| 1938–39 | Montreal Canadiens | NHL | 31 | 8 | 13 | 21 | 2 | 3 | 1 | 0 | 1 | 0 |
| 1938–39 | New Haven Eagles | IAHL | 18 | 6 | 9 | 15 | 7 | — | — | — | — | — |
| 1939–40 | Montreal Canadiens | NHL | 48 | 12 | 7 | 19 | 24 | — | — | — | — | — |
| 1940–41 | Montreal Canadiens | NHL | 16 | 2 | 3 | 5 | 2 | — | — | — | — | — |
| 1940–41 | New Haven Eagles | AHL | 20 | 22 | 13 | 35 | 11 | 2 | 0 | 0 | 0 | 0 |
| 1941–42 | Washington Lions | AHL | 54 | 37 | 29 | 66 | 11 | 2 | 1 | 0 | 1 | 0 |
| 1942–43 | Cleveland Barons | AHL | 18 | 8 | 5 | 13 | 0 | 4 | 0 | 1 | 1 | 2 |
| 1943–44 | Cleveland Barons | AHL | 52 | 29 | 47 | 76 | 13 | 11 | 4 | 2 | 6 | 2 |
| 1944–45 | Cleveland Barons | AHL | 60 | 45 | 48 | 93 | 25 | 12 | 8 | 5 | 13 | 0 |
| 1945–46 | Cleveland Barons | AHL | 61 | 33 | 46 | 79 | 24 | 12 | 7 | 4 | 11 | 8 |
| 1946–47 | Cleveland Barons | AHL | 50 | 20 | 29 | 49 | 12 | — | — | — | — | — |
| 1947–48 | Cleveland Barons | AHL | 13 | 1 | 6 | 7 | 6 | — | — | — | — | — |
| 1948–49 | Montreal Royals | QSHL | 2 | 0 | 0 | 0 | 0 | 3 | 0 | 0 | 0 | 0 |
| 1949–50 | Cleveland Knights | EAHL | — | — | — | — | — | — | — | — | — | — |
| 1950–51 | Grand Rapids Rockets | IHL | 19 | 10 | 25 | 35 | 10 | 3 | 0 | 0 | 0 | 0 |
| 1951–52 | Grand Rapids Rockets | IHL | 17 | 2 | 10 | 12 | 20 | 13 | 2 | 3 | 5 | 12 |
| 1952–53 | Saint-Jérôme Alouettes | QPHL | 62 | 18 | 25 | 43 | — | — | — | — | — | — |
| 1953–54 | Milwaukee Chiefs | IHL | 11 | 1 | 6 | 7 | 4 | — | — | — | — | — |
| IAHL/AHL totals | | | 346 | 201 | 232 | 433 | 109 | 43 | 20 | 12 | 32 | 12 |
| NHL totals | | | 310 | 50 | 68 | 118 | 122 | 24 | 1 | 3 | 4 | 4 |
