= Andy Mulligan (ice hockey) =

- Born: February 12, 1906; Winnipeg, Manitoba, Canada
- Died: May 26, 1984 (aged 78); Toledo, Ohio, U.S.
- Height: 6 ft 0 in (183 cm)
- Weight: 195 lb (88 kg; 13 st 13 lb)
- Position: Defenseman
- Played for: Regina Capitals; St. Paul Saints; Chicago Shamrocks; St. Louis Flyers; Saskatoon Crescents; Duluth Natives; St. Paul Greyhounds; Boston Cubs; Providence Reds; Minneapolis Millers; Kansas City Greyhounds; Toledo Babcocks
- Coached for: Toledo Babcocks; Toledo Mercurys
- Playing career: 1927–1942
- Coaching career: 1940–1950

Andrew Mulligan (February 12, 1906 – May 26, 1984) was a Canadian–American ice hockey player, coach, and executive who was the manager of the Toledo Sports Arena 1950 to 1973, general manager of the Toledo Mercurys from its founding in 1947 until it folded in 1962, and commissioner of the International Hockey League from 1962 to 1969.

== Playing career ==
Mulligan was born on February 12, 1906, in Winnipeg. He played junior hockey for the University of Manitoba and Winnipeg Rangers. He passed on medical school to pursue a professional hockey career.

Mulligan played professionally in the Prairie Hockey League (Regina Capitals), American Hockey Association (St. Paul Saints, Chicago Shamrocks, St. Louis Flyers, St. Paul Greyhounds, Minneapolis Millers, and Kansas City Greyhounds), Western Canada Hockey League (Saskatoon Crescents), Central Hockey League (Duluth Natives), Canadian–American Hockey League (Boston Cubs and Providence Reds), and Michigan Ontario Hockey League (Toledo Babcocks) from 1927 to 1942.

During his professional career, Mulligan supplemented his income by working for a railroad in Canada. When World War II created a lack of playing opportunities, Mulligan worked for the railroad full time, rising to the position of assistant yardmaster.

== Coaching ==
Mulligan began his coaching career in 1940 as the player–coach of the Toledo Babcocks. In 1941 he became the head coach of the St. James Canadians junior hockey team.

In 1947, Mulligan returned to Toledo as the head coach and business manager of the expansion Toledo Mercurys of the International Hockey League. The Mercurys won the Turner Cup in their first year of existence. He remained head coach until 1950, when he became manager of the Toledo Sports Arena.

== Management ==
In 1962, Toledo surrendered its IHL franchise and Mulligan was appointed commissioner of the league. He stepped down as commissioner after the 1968–69 season, but continued to manage the Sports Arena until 1973. In 1974, Mulligan helped secure an IHL expansion team for the city of Toledo as the representative for an ownership group led by Virgil Gladieux. He served as a consultant for the Toledo Goaldiggers for four seasons.

== Death ==
Mulligan died on May 26, 1984, after a brief illness. He was predeceased by his wife, Millie, who was the box office manager for the Sports Arena for 22 years.

== Career statistics ==
=== Playing statistics ===
Season	Team	League	GP	G	A	Pts	PIM
1926–27	Regina Capitals	PHL	25	3	0	3	2
1927–28	Regina Capitals	PHL	28	14	5	19	51
1928–29	St. Paul Saints	AHA	34	4	5	9	25
1929–30	St. Paul Saints	AHA	46	3	7	10	55
1930–31	Chicago Shamrocks	AHA	45	4	3	7	31
1931–32	St. Louis Flyers	AHA	47	5	2	7	30
1932–33	Saskatoon Crescents	WCHL	21	11	6	17	4
1932–33	Duluth Natives	CHL	3	1	1	2	2
1932–33	St. Paul Greyhounds	AHA	4	0	0	0	2
1933–34	Boston Cubs	CAHL	11	0	0	0	0
1933–34	Providence Reds	CAHL	--	4	5	9	38
1934–35	Providence Reds	CAHL	--	7	7	14	61
1935–36	Providence Reds	CAHL	--	3	7	10	35
1936–37	Minneapolis Millers	AHA	47	2	10	12	40
1937–38	Minneapolis Millers	AHA	48	8	16	24	38
1938–39	Minneapolis Millers	AHA	48	6	11	17	45
1939–40	Kansas City Greyhounds	AHA	48	3	5	8	21
1940–41	Toledo Babcocks	MOHL	--	4	10	14	23
1941–42	St. Paul Saints	AHA	1	0	0	0	0
AHA totals			368	35	70	105	287
CAHL totals			--	14	19	33	134
PHL totals			53	17	5	22	53
MOHL totals			--	4	10	14	23
WCHL totals			21	11	6	17	4
CHL totals			3	1	1	2	2

=== Coaching record ===
Team	Year	Regular season						Post season
Team	Year	G	W	L	T	Pts	Division Rank	Result
Toledo Babcocks	1940–41	27	13	12	2	28	3rd in MOHL	Lost in first round
Toledo Mercurys	1947–48	30	15	10	5	35	2nd in IL	Won Turner Cup
Toledo Mercurys North	1948–49	35	20	7	8	48	1st in North	Did Not Participate
Toledo Mercurys South	1948–49	32	21	7	4	46	2nd in South	Lost Turner Cup finals
Toledo Buckeyes	1949–50	51	26	13	12	64	2nd in East	N/A
Total		175	95	49	31	381		
