= Ross Johnstone =

Canadian ice hockey player

- Born: April 7, 1926; Montreal, Quebec, Canada
- Died: December 31, 2009 (aged 83); Toronto, Ontario, Canada
- Height: 6 ft 0 in (183 cm)
- Weight: 185 lb (84 kg; 13 st 3 lb)
- Position: Defence
- Shot: Left
- Played for: Toronto Maple Leafs
- Playing career: 1941–1957

Robert Rosslyn Johnstone (April 7, 1926 – December 31, 2009) was a Canadian professional ice hockey player who played 42 games in the National Hockey League with the Toronto Maple Leafs during the 1943–44 and 1944–45 seasons. In 1945 his name was put on the Stanley Cup. He was born in Montreal, Quebec.

== Career statistics ==
=== Regular season and playoffs ===
			Regular season					Playoffs
Season	Team	League	GP	G	A	Pts	PIM	GP	G	A	Pts	PIM
1942–43	Toronto Marlboros	OHA	19	1	9	10	16	3	0	1	1	6
1942–43	Oshawa Generals	OHA	—	—	—	—	—	13	3	3	6	27
1942–43	Oshawa Generals	M-Cup	—	—	—	—	—	11	2	3	5	223
1943–44	Toronto Maple Leafs	NHL	18	2	0	2	6	3	0	0	0	0
1943–44	Providence Reds	AHL	6	1	0	1	2	—	—	—	—	—
1944–45	Toronto Maple Leafs	NHL	24	3	4	7	8	—	—	—	—	—
1945–46	Pittsburgh Hornets	AHL	56	1	7	8	23	—	—	—	—	—
1946–47	Springfield Indians	AHL	33	1	7	8	2	2	1	0	1	0
1947–48	Springfield Indians	AHL	68	2	19	21	10	—	—	—	—	—
1948–49	New Haven Ramblers	AHL	10	1	3	4	2	—	—	—	—	—
1949–50	Detroit Hettche	IHL	18	7	3	10	6	3	1	0	1	0
1950–51	Toronto Marlboros	OMHL	31	7	6	13	36	3	1	1	2	0
1951–52	Atlantic City Sea Gulls	EAHL	38	7	10	17	8	—	—	—	—	—
AHL totals			173	6	36	42	39	2	1	0	1	0
NHL totals			42	5	4	9	14	3	0	0	0	0
