= Toledo Mercurys =

- City: Toledo, Ohio
- League: International Hockey League
- Operated: 1947–1962
- Home arena: Toledo Sports Arena
- Colors: Green & Gold

Franchise history
- 1947–1949: Toledo Mercurys
- 1949–1950: Toledo Buckeyes (EAHL)
- 1950–1955: Toledo Mercurys
- 1955–1956: Toledo-Marion Mercurys
- 1956–1959: Toledo Mercurys
- 1959–1960: Toledo-St. Louis Mercurys
- 1960–1962: Toledo Mercurys

Championships
- Regular season titles: 1 (1948–49)
- Division titles: 2 (1948–49, 1960–61)
- Turner Cups: 3 (1947–48, 1950–51, 1951–52)

The Toledo Mercurys are a former International Hockey League franchise from Toledo, Ohio. The Toledo Franchise was the first IHL franchise to be granted outside of the Windsor-Detroit area, for the cost of $1000 to Virgil Gladeaux of Toledo. The Mercurys existed 15 seasons in total from 1947 to 1962 with some minor naming variations. Toledo was successful on the ice, being the first IHL team to win multiple Turner Cup championships, and the first to do so consecutively.

== History ==
For the 1949–50 season, the franchise was known as the Toledo Buckeyes.

The Mercurys won the Turner during their first year of operation in the 1947–48 season. Toledo defeated the Windsor Hettche Spitfires four games to one in the IHL championship series. Team coach and manager Andy Mulligan had signed nine players from his native Manitoba to build the team, including team captain and right-winger Max Labovitch, center Barney O'Connell and left wing Jake Kernahan . The Mercurys later won the United States Amateur hockey title, defeating the Elveth Rangers in two games, and the New York Rovers in three games.

In the 1948–49 season, the team played in both the north and south division of the IHL, because the team owners wanted to play more games. The Mercurys of the north division won the J. P. McGuire Trophy that year by capturing the IHL North title. In a rematch of the previous season's IHL championship, Windsor defeated Toledo four games to three.

For the 1949–50 season, the team was known as the Toledo Buckeyes while playing in the Eastern Amateur Hockey League. They were sponsored by the former Buckeye Brewing Company in Toledo. The team returned to the IHL in 1950 known again as the Mercurys. Toledo won consecutive Turner Cups in 1950–51 and 1951–52 defeating the Grand Rapids Rockets in the finals both seasons.

In the 1955–56 season, the Mercurys played some home games in Marion, Ohio at the Veterans Memorial Coliseum, hence being known as the Toledo-Marion Mercurys. The Mercurys split home games between arenas again for the 1959–60 season. The Toledo-St. Louis Mercurys played some home games in St. Louis, Missouri at the St. Louis Arena.

The Mercurys franchise folded after the 1961–62 season. The International Hockey League returned to Toledo in 1963, with the Toledo Blades franchise.

== Season-by-season record ==
Turner Cup Champions †	League Leader in points *	Division Champions ¤

Season	League	Team	Division	Regular Season								Post Season					
Season	League	Team	Division	Finish	GP	W	L	T	Pts	GF	GA	GP	W	L	GF	GA	Result
1947-48	IHL	Toledo Mercurys	—	2nd	30	15	10	5	35	113	98	7	6	1	41	24	Won in semifinals, 2-0 (Detroit Bright's Goodyears); Won Turner Cup Finals, 4-1 (Winsdor Hettche Spitfires) †
1948-49	IHL	Toledo Mercurys South	Southern	2nd	32	21	7	4	46	173	93	12	7	5	60	51	Won in quarterfinals, 3-0 (Munice); Won in semifinals, 1-1 (Won Goal Total 9–7) (Milwaukee); Lost Turner Cup Finals, 3-4 (Winsdor Hettche Spitfires)
1948-49	IHL	Toledo Mercurys North	Northern ¤	1st	35	20	7	8	48*	185	140	—	—	—	—	—	Did Not Participate
1949-50	EAHL	Toledo Buckeyes	West	2nd	51	26	13	12	64	188	142	—	—	—	—	—	N/A
1950-51	IHL	Toledo Mercurys	—	2nd	56	35	15	6	76	290	174	8	7	1	35	17	Won in semifinals, 3-0 (Sarnia); Won Turner Cup Finals, 4-1 (Grand Rapids) †
1951-52	IHL	Toledo Mercurys	—	2nd	48	24	18	6	54	210	192	10	8	2	50	35	Won in semifinals, 4-0 (Chatham); Won Turner Cup Finals, 4-2 (Grand Rapids) †
1952-53	IHL	Toledo Mercurys	—	3rd	60	32	25	3	67	210	207	5	1	4	8	22	Lost in semifinals, 1-4 (Cincinnati)
1953-54	IHL	Toledo Mercurys	—	4th	64	33	26	5	71	221	157	5	2	3	11	15	Won in quarterfinals, 2-1 (Troy); Lost in semifinals, 0-2 (Johnstown)
1954-55	IHL	Toledo Mercurys	—	3rd	60	31	29	0	62	183	196	3	0	3	6	13	Lost in semifinals, 1-4 (Cincinnati)
1955-56	IHL	Toledo - Marion Mercurys	—	3rd	60	25	30	5	55	178	229	9	3	6	15	23	Won in semifinals, 3-2 (Troy); Lost Turner Cup Finals, 0-4 (Cincinnati)
1956-57	IHL	Toledo Mercurys	—	5th	60	26	30	4	56	166	186	5	2	3	11	11	Lost in semifinals, 2-3 (Indianapolis)
1957-58	IHL	Toledo Mercurys	—	5th	64	26	32	6	58	214	248	—	—	—	—	—	Did not qualify
1958-59	IHL	Toledo Mercurys	—	5th	60	22	36	2	46	196	248	—	—	—	—	—	Did not qualify
1959-60	IHL	Toledo - St. Louis Mercurys	Eastern	3rd	68	28	36	4	60	266	298	—	—	—	—	—	Did not qualify
1960-61	IHL	Toledo Mercurys	Eastern ¤	1st	70	36	33	1	73	274	260	8	3	5	30	32	Lost in round Robin, 3-5 (Fort Wayne Eliminated, Muskegon Advances)
1961-62	IHL	Toledo Mercurys	—	7th	68	17	50	1	35	222	352	—	—	—	—	—	Did not qualify
15 IHL Seasons			2 Division Titles 1 McGuire Trophy		835	391	384	60	842 (.504)	3,101	3,078	72	39	33	267	243	10 Playoff Appearances; 3 Turner Cup Championships

== Franchise records ==
=== All-time leaders ===
Goals
1	Roger Maisonneuve	161
2	Gordie Cowan	137
3	Billy Booth	113
4	John Kovich	111
5	Dick Pontarollo	110

Assists
1	Gordie Cowan	267
2	Bill Mitchell	213
3	Roger Maisonneuve	161
4	John Kovich	152
5	Billy Booth	128

Points
1	Gordie Cowan	404
2	Roger Maisonneuve	322
3	Bill Mitchell	314
4	John Kovich	263
5	Billy Booth	241

=== Single season leaders ===
Goals
	Player	Season	
1	Dick Pontarollo	1953–54	50
2	Leo Richard	1948–49	47
3	George Harrison	1948–49	46
4	Roger Maisonneuve	1960–61	45
5	Barney O'Connell	1950–51	42

Assists
	Player	Season	
1	Leo Richard	1948–49	61
2	Gordie Cowan	1958–59	58
3	Dick Pontarollo	1953–54	56
3	Gordie Cowan	1960–61	56
5	Roy Hammond	1953–54	54

Points
	Player	Season	
1	Leo Richard	1948–49	108
2	Dick Pontarollo	1953–54	106
3	Barney O'Connell	1950–51	89
3	Roy Hammond	1953–54	89
5	Roger Maisonneuve	1959–60; 1960–61	86

Preceded by First Team	Professional Hockey Team in Toledo, Ohio; 1947–1962	Succeeded by Toledo Blades
Preceded by Windsor Spitfires	Turner Cup; Champions; 1947–48	Succeeded by Windsor Hettche Spitfires
Preceded by Windsor Hettche Spitfires	McGuire Trophy; Champions; 1948–49	Succeeded by Sarnia Sailors
Preceded by Chatham Maroons	Turner Cup; Champions; 1950–51, 1951–52	Succeeded by Cincinnati Mohawks
