= Cincinnati Mohawks =

- City: Cincinnati, Ohio
- League: American Hockey League; International Hockey League
- Operated: 1949–1958
- Home arena: Cincinnati Gardens
- Colors: Red, white, black

Franchise history
- 1941–1943: Washington Lions
- 1947–1949: Washington Lions
- 1949–1952 AHL: Cincinnati Mohawks
- 1952–1958 IHL: Cincinnati Mohawks

Championships
- Regular season titles: six in the IHL (1952–53, 1953–54, 1954–55, 1955–56, 1956–57, 1957–58)
- Turner Cups: 5 (1952–53, 1953–54, 1954–55, 1955–56, 1956–57)

The Cincinnati Mohawks was the name of two professional ice hockey teams in Cincinnati, Ohio who played their home games at the Cincinnati Gardens. The first Mohawks' club were members of the American Hockey League (AHL) between 1949 and 1952 while the second Mohawks' club played in the International Hockey League from 1952 to 1958.

In 1949, the Washington Lions relocated to Cincinnati and took on the name Mohawks. The club would be the first ice hockey team to serve the city of Cincinnati and were a farm team to the Montreal Canadiens from 1949 to 1951 and the New York Rangers from 1950 to 1952. The AHL variation of the Mohawks were less than impressive on the ice and finished last in their first two seasons. The club managed a playoff berth in the third season and advanced to the second round of the playoffs where they were knocked out by the Providence Reds 3 games to 1. However, during the AHL Mohawks three-year run, the club reportedly lost $200,000 so ownership decided to take a leave of absence from the league and reorganize. The organization formed a new company called the Cincinnati Mohawks, Inc., and obtained a franchise in the smaller and more manageable IHL.

The new Mohawks club were loaded with highly talented young players such as Phil Goyette, Don Marshall, Charlie Hodge, Duke Edmundson, Billy Goold, John "Bun" Smith, Eddie Kachur, and coach Rollie McLenahan. Most of the club's players were provided by the Montreal Canadiens. While the Canadiens dominated the National Hockey League during the era, the Mohawks dominated the IHL. In their six-year stint in the league, Cincinnati's dynasty won six-straight regular season titles and five Turner Cup Championships. The IHL never saw another club match the Mohawks success during its 56-year run as a league.

== Regular season ==
Cincinnati Mohawks of the AHL

Season	Games	Won	Lost	Tied	Points	GF	GA	Standing
1949–50	70	19	37	14	52	185	257	5th, West
1950–51	70	28	34	8	64	203	228	5th, West
1951–52	68	29	33	6	64	183	228	3rd, West

Cincinnati Mohawks of the IHL

Season	Games	Won	Lost	Tied	Points	GF	GA	Standing
1952–53	60	43	13	4	90	310	152	1st, IHL
1953–54	64	47	15	2	96	325	153	1st, IHL
1954–55	60	40	19	1	81	268	164	1st, IHL
1955–56	60	45	13	2	92	336	159	1st, IHL
1956–57	60	50	9	1	101	245	113	1st, IHL
1957–58	64	43	16	5	91	303	176	1st, IHL

== Playoffs ==
Cincinnati Mohawks of the AHL

Season	1st round	2nd round	Finals
1949–50	Out of Playoffs		
1950–51	Out of Playoffs		
1951–52	W, 3–0, Buffalo	L, 1–3, Providence	—

Cincinnati Mohawks of the IHL

Season	1st round	2nd round	Finals
1952–53	W, 4–1, Toledo	None	W, 4–0, Grand Rapids
1953–54	W, 4–1, Marion	Bye	W, 4–2, Johnstown
1954–55	W, 3–0, Toledo	None	W, 4–3, Troy
1955–56	W, 3–0, Fort Wayne	None	W, 4–0, Toledo-Marion
1956–57	W, 3–1, Huntington	None	W, 3–0, Indianapolis
1957–58	L, 1–3, Louisville	—	—

== Players ==
=== American Hockey League Hall of Famers ===
AHL Hall of Fame Honored Members
Name	Seasons	Induction Year
Jack Gordon	1950-51 (player)	2012
Zellio Toppazzini	1951-52 (player)	2012
