= Stratford Midgets =

Canadian junior ice hockey team (1910s to 1930s)

- City: Stratford, Ontario, Canada
- League: Ontario Hockey Association
- Operated: 1900s to 1930s
- Home arena: Stratford Arena

The Stratford Midgets were a Canadian junior ice hockey based in Stratford, Ontario, also known as the Stratford Majors. They played home games at the Stratford Arena and were members of the Ontario Hockey Association. Alumni Frank Rankin and Howie Morenz are inductees of the Hockey Hall of Fame.

== History ==
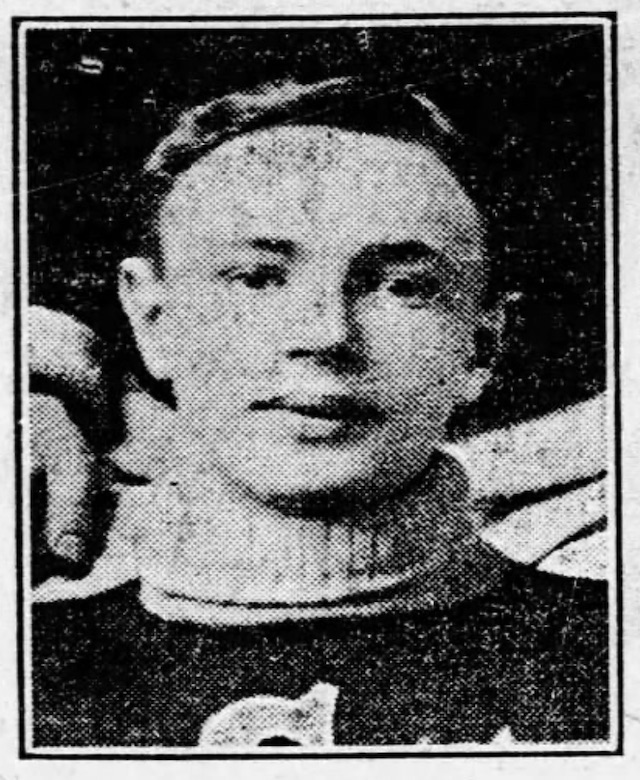
Frank Rankin playing for Stratford c. 1909

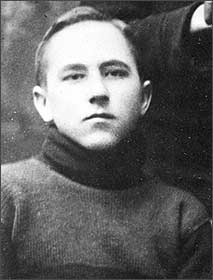
Howie Morenz playing for Stratford c. 1919 – c. 1922

Stratford won consecutive Ontario Hockey Association (OHA) junior championships from 1907 to 1909, and won the J. Ross Robertson Cup as OHA junior champions in 1921. Stratford were finalists for the J. Ross Robertson Cup in 1920, 1933, 1934 and 1937.

In the 1920–21 season, Stratford were led in scoring by Howie Morenz, and lost only one game on route to the Eastern Canada junior championship. At the 1921 Memorial Cup, the Winnipeg Junior Falcons defeated Stratford in two games by 11 goals to 9.

Stratford was renamed the Stratford Kist as of the 1939–40 OHA season.

== Notable alumni ==
Two alumni of Stratford were inducted into the Hockey Hall of Fame; including Frank Rankin, and Howie Morenz. Goaltender Joe Turner died serving in the United States Army during World War II. In his honour, the International Hockey League named its championship trophy, the Turner Cup.

List of Stratford alumni who played in the National Hockey League:

- Frank Carson
- Hank D'Amore
- Joffre Desilets
- Ray Getliffe
- Jud McAtee
- Norm McAtee
- Bob McCulley
- Howie Morenz
- Al Murray
- Joe Turner
