= 1953–54 IHL season =

North American ice hockey season

The 1953–54 IHL season was the ninth season of the International Hockey League, a North American minor professional league. Nine teams participated in the regular season, and the Cincinnati Mohawks won the Turner Cup.

== Regular season ==
	GP	W	L	T	GF	GA	Pts
Cincinnati Mohawks	64	47	15	2	325	153	96
Marion Barons	64	40	24	0	279	207	80
Johnstown Jets	65	35	27	3	254	221	73
Toledo Mercurys	64	33	26	5	221	157	71
Fort Wayne Komets	64	29	30	5	203	220	63
Troy Bruins	64	31	32	1	241	258	63
Grand Rapids Rockets	64	29	32	3	252	274	61
Louisville Shooting Stars	64	18	42	4	202	331	40
Milwaukee Chiefs	64	13	48	3	187	343	29

== Turner Cup-Playoffs ==
Turner-Cup-Quarterfinals
1	Cincinnati Mohawks	4
2	Marion Barons	1
3	Johnstown Jets	2
5	Fort Wayne Komets	0
4	Toledo Mercurys	2
6	Troy Bruins	1

Turner-Cup-Semifinals
1	Cincinnati Mohawks
Bye
3	Johnstown Jets	2
4	Toledo Mercurys	0

Turner-Cup-Final
1	Cincinnati Mohawks	4
3	Johnstown Jets	2

== Turner Cup playoffs ==
=== Quarterfinals ===
Cincinnati Mohawks 4, Marion Barons 1

Game	Date	Visitor	Score	Home	Series	Arena	Attendance
1	March 16	Marion Barons	4–3	Cincinnati Mohawks	1–0	Cincinnati Gardens	2,409
2	March 17	Cincinnati Moahwks	5–3	Marion Barons	1–1	Veterans Memorial Coliseum	1,000
3	March 18	Marion Barons	2–4	Cincinnati Mohawks	2–1	Cincinnati Gardens	2,435
4	March 20	Cincinnati Mohawks	4–1	Marion Barons	3–1	Veterans Memorial Coliseum	1,487
5	March 21	Marion Barons	1–3	Cincinnati Mohawks	4–1	Cincinnati Gardens	3,486

Johnstown Jets 2, Fort Wayne Komets 0

Game	Date	Visitor	Score	Home	Series	Arena	Attendance
1	March 16	Fort Wayne Komets	4–5	Johnston Jets	1–0	Cambria County War Memorial Arena	N/A
2	March 17	Johnstown Jets	3–2	Fort Wayne Komets	2–0	Allen County War Memorial Coliseum	N/A

Toledo Mercurys 2, Troy Bruins 1

Game	Date	Visitor	Score	Home	Series	Arena	Attendance
1	March 16	Troy Bruins	1–3	Toledo Mercurys	1–0	Toledo Sports Arena	N/A
2	March 17	Toledo Mercurys	0–4	Troy Bruins	1–1	Hobart Arena	N/A
3	March 20	Troy Bruins	4–7	Toledo Mercurys	2–1	Toledo Sports Arena	N/A

=== Semifinals ===
Johnstown Jets 2, Toledo Mercurys 0

Game	Date	Visitor	Score	Home	Series	Arena	Attendance
1	March 22	Johnstown Jets	3–1	Toledo Mercurys	1–0	Toledo Sports Arena	N/A
2	March 23	Toledo Mercurys	0–3	Johnstown Jets	2–0	Cambria County War Memorial Arena	N/A

=== Turner Cup Finals ===
Cincinnati Mohawks 4, Johnstown Jets 2

Game	Date	Visitor	Score	Home	Series	Arena	Attendance
1	March 25	Johnstown Jets	0–3	Cincinnati Mohawks	1–0	Cincinnati Gardens	2,203
2	March 27	Johnstown Jets	3–2	Cincinnati Mohawks	1–1	Cincinnati Gardens	4,327
3	March 28	Cincinnati Mohawks	1–0 OT	Johnstown Jets	2–1	Cambria County War Memorial Arena	3,100
4	March 30	Cincinnati Mohawks	3–1	Johnstown Jets	3–1	Cambria County War Memorial Arena	2,947
5	April 1	Cincinnati Mohawks	3–2 OT	Johnston Jets	3–2	Cambria County War Memorial Arena	2,471
6	April 3	Cincinnati Mohawks	3–1	Johnstown Jets	4–2	Cambria County War Memorial Arena	3,920

== Awards ==
Award Name	Accomplishment	Player	Team
James Gatschene Memorial Trophy	Most Valuable Player	No Award Issued	
George H. Wilkinson Trophy	Top Scorer	Don Hall	Johnstown Jets

== Coaches ==
- Cincinnati Mohawks: Rollie McLenahan
- Fort Wayne Komets: Jack Timmins, Pat Wilson
- Grand Rapids Rockets: Norm Grinke
- Johnstown Jets: Chirp Brenchley
- Louisville Stars: Alex Woods
- Marion Barons Ott Heller
- Milwaukee Chiefs: Louis Trudel
- Toledo Mercurys: Doug McCaig
- Troy Bruins: Norm McAtee
