= Frank Gallagher (ice hockey) =

Canadian–American ice hockey executive

Frank Gallagher was a Canadian–American ice hockey executive who served as president and commissioner of the International Hockey League and was the first owner of the Flint Generals of the same league.

== Early life ==
Gallagher grew up in Windsor, Ontario and attended the University of Detroit High School and Assumption College. He played hockey in high school and played for and organized various amateur teams in the Detroit-Windsor area.

== International Hockey League ==
Following the end of World War II, Jack Adams wanted to start a new hockey league to fill dates at the Detroit Olympia. On December 5, 1945, Adams and other Detroit area hockey figures, including Gallagher, met at the Norton Palmer Hotel in Windsor, Ontario, to organize the International Hockey League (IHL). Gallagher was an assistant to the IHL's managing director Fred Huber. Huber was also the public relations director for the Detroit Red Wings and Gallagher served as the team's statistician.

In 1951, Gallagher was elected league president following the death of Gerald McHugh. In 1960, he was appointed to the newly created position of commissioner, which was full-time and had broader powers over league affairs. He stepped down in 1962 to become general manager of the Port Huron Flags – an IHL expansion team. The Flags won the Turner Cup in 1966. The following season, he took the same role with another expansion team – the Columbus Checkers. He left the team after its inaugural season to become the administrative coordinator of the Muskegon Mohawks. In 1969, Gallagher started another IHL team, the Flint Generals. He sold the team in 1975 and retired to Florida.

When commissioner Bill Beagan left the IHL for the Ontario Major Junior Hockey League, Gallagher came out of retirement to serve as interim commissioner for the remainder of 1978–79 season.

== Amateur Hockey Association of the United States ==
Gallagher was the longtime vice president of the Amateur Hockey Association of the United States (now USA Hockey). He was also the business manager for Team USA at the 1976 Canada Cup, general manager of the United States team at the 1976, 1977, and 1978 Ice Hockey World Championships, and an advisor to the 1980 U.S. Olympic team. He was a vice president of AHAUS as of 1980.

== Honors and awards ==
In 1964, he was awarded the AHAUS's Citation Award for "contributions to the advancement of American amateur hockey". The IHL recognized him with the Frank Gallagher Trophy, awarded to the regular season champion of the north division. In 2000, he received the distinguished service award from the Greater Flint Area Sports Hall of Fame.
