= 1954–55 IHL season =

North American ice hockey season

The 1954–55 IHL season was the tenth season of the International Hockey League, a North American minor professional league. Six teams participated in the regular season, and the Cincinnati Mohawks won the Turner Cup.

== Regular season ==
	GP	W	L	T	GF	GA	Pts
Cincinnati Mohawks	60	40	19	1	268	164	81
Troy Bruins	60	31	27	2	190	180	64
Toledo Mercurys	60	31	29	0	183	196	62
Grand Rapids Rockets	60	28	31	1	199	215	57
Johnstown Jets	60	25	34	1	188	215	51
Fort Wayne Komets	60	22	37	1	181	235	45

== Turner Cup-Playoffs ==
Turner-Cup-Semifinals
1	Cincinnati	3
3	Toledo	0
2	Troy	3
4	Grand Rapids	1

Turner-Cup-Final
1	Cincinnati	4
2	Troy	3

== Turner Cup playoffs ==
=== Semifinals ===
Cincinnati Mohawks 3, Toledo Mercurys 0

Game	Date	Visitor	Score	Home	Series	Arena	Attendance
1	March 15	Toledo Mercurys	2–5	Cincinnati Mohawks	1–0	Cincinnati Gardens	1,199
2	March 19	Cincinnati Mohawks	4–2	Toledo Mercury	2–0	Toledo Sports Arena	2,053
3	March 20	Toledo Mercurys	2–4	Cincinnati Mohawks	3–0	Cincinnati Gardens	1,645

Troy Bruins 3, Grand Rapids Rockets 1

Game	Date	Visitor	Score	Home	Series	Arena	Attendance
1	March 15	Grand Rapids Rockets	1–3	Troy Bruins	1–0	Hobart Arena	N/A
2	March 18	Troy Bruins	1–2	Grand Rapids Rockets	1–1	Stadium Arena	N/A
3	March 20	Grand Rapids Rockets	0–2	Troy Bruins	2–1	Hobart Arena	N/A
4	March 22	Troy Bruins	6–4	Grand Rapids Rockets	3–1	Stadium Arena	N/A

=== Turner Cup Finals ===
Cincinnati Mohawks 4, Troy Bruins 3

Game	Date	Visitor	Score	Home	Series	Arena	Attendance
1	March 24	Troy Bruins	2–3	Cincinnati Mohawks	1–0	Cincinnati Gardens	1,246
2	March 26	Cincinnati Mohawks	5–8	Troy Bruins	1–1	Hobart Arena	1,501
3	March 27	Troy Bruins	0–7	Cincinnati Mohawks	2–1	Cincinnati Gardens	1,880
4	March 29	Cincinnati Mohawks	5–2	Troy Bruins	3–1	Hobart Arena	2,000
5	March 31	Troy Bruins	4–1	Cincinnati Mohawks	3–2	Cincinnati Gardens	1,724
6	April 2	Cincinnati Mohawks	2–3	Troy Bruins	3–3	Hobart Arena	3,103
7	April 3	Troy Bruins	0–7	Cincinnati Mohawks	4–3	Cincinnati Gardens	2,742

== Awards ==
Award Name	Accomplishment	Player	Team
James Gatschene Memorial Trophy	Most Valuable Player	Phil Goyette	Cincinnati Mohawks
George H. Wilkinson Trophy	Top Scorer	Phil Goyette	Cincinnati Mohawks

== Coaches ==
- Cincinnati Mohawks: Rollie McLenahan
- Fort Wayne Komets: Pat Wilson
- Grand Rapids Rockets: Norm Grinke
- Johnstown Jets: Chirp Brenchley
- Toledo Mercurys: Doug McCaig
- Troy Bruins: Nels Podolsky
