= 1955–56 IHL season =

North American ice hockey season

The 1955–56 IHL season was the 11th season of the International Hockey League, a North American minor professional league. Six teams participated in the regular season, and the Cincinnati Mohawks won the Turner Cup.

== Regular season ==
	GP	W	L	T	GF	GA	Pts
Cincinnati Mohawks	60	45	13	2	336	159	92
Troy Bruins	60	39	20	1	216	152	79
Fort Wayne Komets	60	29	29	2	272	219	60
Toledo-Marion Mercurys	60	25	30	5	178	229	55
Grand Rapids Rockets	60	24	33	3	198	237	51
Indianapolis Chiefs	60	11	48	1	126	330	23

== Turner Cup-Playoffs ==
Turner-Cup-Semifinals
1	Cincinnati Mohawks	3
3	Fort Wayne Komets	1
2	Troy Bruins	2
4	Toledo-Marion Mercurys	3

Turner-Cup-Final
1	Cincinnati Mohawks	4
4	Toledo-Marion Mercurys	0

== Turner Cup playoffs ==
=== Semifinals ===
Cincinnati Mohawks 3, Fort Wayne Komets 1

Game	Date	Visitor	Score	Home	Series	Arena	Attendance
1	March 15	Fort Wayne Komets	2–1	Cincinnati Mohawks	1–0	Cincinnati Gardens	1,375
2	March 18	Cincinnati Mohawks	4–1	Fort Wayne Komets	1–1	Allen County War Memorial Coliseum	6,521
3	March 20	Fort Wayne Komets	1–5	Cincinnati Mohawks	2–1	Cincinnati Gardens	1,403
4	March 21	Cincinnati Mohawks	4–2	Fort Wayne Komets	3–1	Allen County War Memorial Coliseum	2,424

Toledo-Marion Mercurys 3, Troy Bruins 2

Game	Date	Visitor	Score	Home	Series	Arena	Attendance
1	March 15	Toledo-Marion Mercurys	2–1	Troy Bruins	1–0	Hobart Arena	N/A
2	March 17	Troy Bruins	2–1	Toledo-Marion Mercurys	1–1	Toledo Sports Arena	N/A
3	March 18	Toledo-Marion Mercurys	1–2	Troy Bruins	2–1	Hobart Arena	N/A
4	March 20	Troy Bruins	2–3	Toledo-Marion Mercurys	2–2	Toledo Sports Arena	N/A
5	March 22	Toledo-Marion Mercurys	3–2	Toledo-Marion Mercurys	3–2	Toledo Sports Arena	N/A

=== Turner Cup Finals ===
Cincinnati Mohawks 4, Toledo-Marion Mercurys 0

Game	Date	Visitor	Score	Home	Series	Arena	Attendance
1	March 24	Toledo-Marion Mercurys	0–3	Cincinnati Mohawks	1–0	Cincinnati Gardens	2,187
2	March 25	Toledo-Marion Mercurys	4–5 OT	Cincinnati Mohawks	2–0	Cincinnati Gardens	1,137
3	March 27	Cincinnati Mohawks	4–1	Toledo-Marion Mercurys	3–0	Toledo Sports Arena	1,561
4	March 29	Cincinnati Mohawks	2–0	Toledo-Marion Mercurys	4–0	Toledo Sports Arena	1,215

== Awards ==
Award Name	Accomplishment	Player	Team
James Gatschene Memorial Trophy	Most Valuable Player	George Hayes	Grand Rapids Rockets
George H. Wilkinson Trophy	Top Scorer	Max Mekilok	Cincinnati Mohawks
James Norris Memorial Trophy	Fewest Goals Against	Bill Tibbs	Troy Bruins

== Coaches ==
- Cincinnati Mohawks: Rollie McLenahan
- Fort Wayne Komets: Doug McCaig
- Grand Rapids Rockets: Moose Lallo
- Indianapolis Chiefs John Sorrell, Leo Lamoureux
- Toledo-Marion Mercurys: Butch Stahan
- Troy Bruins: Nels Podolsky
