= Andy Mulligan =

Andy Mulligan may refer to:

- Andy Mulligan (author), English writer
- Andy Mulligan (rugby union) (1936–2001), Irish rugby player
- Andy Mulligan (ice hockey) (1906–1984), Canadian–American ice hockey player, coach, and executive
