= Max Labovitch =

Canadian ice hockey player

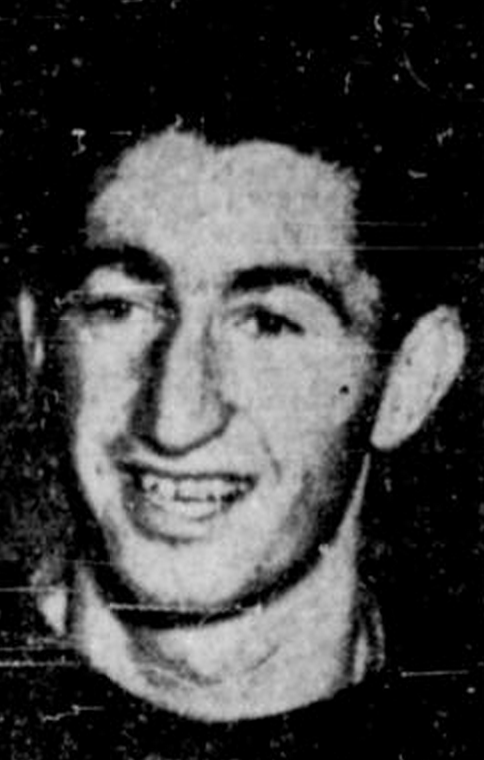
- Born: January 18, 1924 Winnipeg, Manitoba, Canada
- Died: January 14, 2018 (aged 93) Winnipeg, Manitoba, Canada
- Height: 5 ft 11 in (180 cm)
- Weight: 165 lb (75 kg; 11 st 11 lb)
- Position: Right wing
- Shot: Right
- Played for: New York Rangers
- Playing career: 1942–1950

Max Labovitch (January 18, 1924 – January 14, 2018) was a Canadian professional ice hockey player. He was Jewish.

== Biography ==
Labovitch played professional hockey for ten years and missed two seasons due to military service (1942–43 and 1944–45). In 1941–42, he played for the New Haven Eagles of the American Hockey League. In 1943–44 he saw time with both the New York Rangers and the New York Rovers. In 1945, he played for the Vancouver Pros and the Stan Evan Orioles of Winnipeg.

He did not retire from hockey until after the 1949–50 season. That year, he had 42 points in 49 games for the Toledo Buckeyes of the IHL.

Labovitch was inducted into the Manitoba Hockey Hall of Fame in February 2001. He died in January 2018 at the age of 93.

== See also ==
- International Hockey League (1945–2001)
- List of select Jewish ice hockey players
