= Eric Pogue =

Canadian ice hockey player (1929–2008)

- Born: May 8, 1929; Toronto, Ontario Canada
- Died: October 12, 2008 (aged 79); Toronto, Ontario, Canada
- Height: 5 ft 10 in (178 cm)
- Weight: 160 lb (73 kg; 11 st 6 lb)
- Position: Right wing
- Shot: Right
- Played for: Pittsburgh Hornets; St. Louis Flyers; Syracuse Warriors; Cleveland Barons; Buffalo Bisons; Huntington Hornets; Fort Wayne Komets
- Playing career: 1946–1958

Eric "Showboat" Pogue (May 8, 1929 – October 12, 2008) was a Canadian professional hockey player who played over 300 games in the American Hockey League, spending time with the Pittsburgh Hornets, St. Louis Flyers, Syracuse Warriors, Cleveland Barons and Buffalo Bisons. He also played in the International Hockey League for the Huntington Hornets and Fort Wayne Komets. Pogue died in Toronto on October 12, 2008, at the age of 79.
