= 1948–49 IHL season =

North American ice hockey season

The 1948–49 IHL season was the fourth season of the International Hockey League, a North American minor professional league. 11 teams participated in the regular season, and the Windsor Hettche Spitfires won the Turner Cup.

== Regular season ==
Northern Division	GP	W	L	T	GF	GA	Pts
Toledo Mercurys North	35	20	7	8	185	140	48
Detroit Jerry Lynch	31	16	6	9	163	125	44
Detroit Auto Club	31	17	11	3	146	130	39
Windsor Hettche Spitfires	31	15	11	5	152	144	39
Detroit Bright's Goodyears	31	8	16	7	135	154	28
Windsor Ryancretes	31	0	25	6	89	177	6

Southern Division	GP	W	L	T	GF	GA	Pts
Louisville Blades	32	21	5	6	192	127	48
Toledo Mercurys South	32	21	7	4	173	93	46
Milwaukee Clarks	32	16	15	1	148	139	33
Muncie Flyers	32	9	19	4	103	168	22
Akron Americans	32	4	25	3	111	200	11

== Turner-Cup-Playoffs ==
Turner-Cup-Quarterfinals
S2	Toledo Mercurys South	3
S4	Muncie Flyers	0
S1	Louisville Blades	2
S3	Milwaukee Clarks	4
N3	Detroit Auto Club	2
N5	Detroit Bright's Goodyears	0
N2	Detroit Jerry Lynch	0
N4	Windsor Hettche Spitfires	2

Turner-Cup-Semifinals
S2	Toledo Mercurys South	1
S3	Milwaukee Clarks	1
N3	Detroit Auto Club	0
N4	Windsor Hettche Spitfires	4

Turner-Cup-Final
S2	Toledo Mercurys South	3
N4	Windsor Hettche Spitfires	4
