= 1949–50 IHL season =

North American ice hockey season

The 1949–50 IHL season was the fifth season of the International Hockey League, a North American minor professional league. Five teams participated in the regular season, and the Chatham Maroons won the Turner Cup.

== Regular season ==
	GP	W	L	T	GF	GA	Pts
Sarnia Sailors	40	26	11	3	219	136	55
Detroit Auto Club	40	19	14	7	170	139	45
Chatham Maroons	40	19	18	3	152	148	41
Detroit Hettche	40	15	21	4	157	191	34
Windsor Ryancretes	40	10	25	5	152	236	25

== Turner Cup-Playoffs ==
Turner-Cup-Semifinals
1	Sarnia	3
4	DT Hettche	0
2	DT Auto Club	1
3	Chatham	3

Turner-Cup-Final
1	Sarnia	3
3	Chatham	4
