= Stratford Kroehlers =

Canadian junior ice hockey team (1942–1951)

- City: Stratford, Ontario
- League: Ontario Hockey Association
- Operated: 1942–1951
- Home arena: Stratford Arena

The Stratford Kroehlers were a Canadian junior ice hockey team in the Ontario Hockey Association (OHA). Named for sponsor Kroehler Furniture Company, the team played home games at the Stratford Arena, in Stratford, Ontario. The team was known as the Stratford Midgets before 1939, then briefly as the Stratford Kist until 1942.

The Kroehlers played in the OHA junior-A division from 1942 until 1944. Due to the shortage of higher-calibre players during World War II, the Kroehlers dropped down to the Stratford and District Juvenile Hockey League for two seasons, then returned to the OHA junior-A division for the 1946–47 OHA season. (Note: The Stratford Kroehlers joined the OHA junior-A division for the 1942–43 OHA season. The Stratford Kroehlers anticipated forming a Junior-B level team due to wartime restrictions. The Stratford Kroehlers played minor ice hockey in the Stratford and District Juvenile Hockey League for the 1944–45 season. The Stratford Kroehlers returned to the Junior-A level for the 1946–47 OHA season.) In the 1947–48 OHA season, right winger George Armstrong won the Red Tilson Trophy as the OHA's most outstanding player, and the Eddie Powers Memorial Trophy as the league's top scorer.

== National Hockey League alumni ==
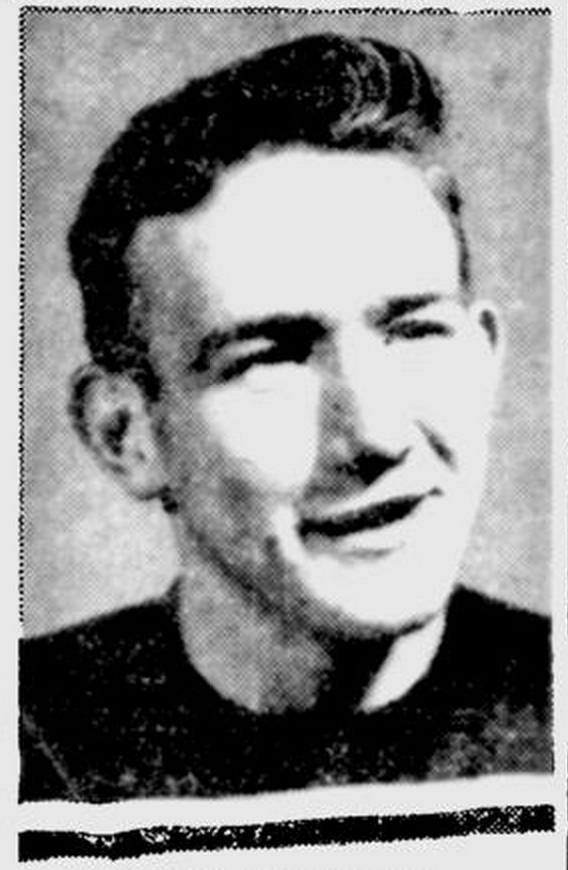
Bill Mitchell, c. 1946

Kroehlers alumnus George Armstrong was inducted into the Hockey Hall of Fame as a player, and Howie Meeker received the Foster Hewitt Memorial Award as a hockey broadcaster.

List of National Hockey League alumni:

- Bob Armstrong
- George Armstrong
- Bob Bailey
- Bill Cupolo
- Jack Jackson
- Joe Klukay
- Arnie Kullman
- Ed Kullman
- Danny Lewicki
- Tom McGrattan
- Howie Meeker
- Bill Mitchell
- George Robertson
- Enio Sclisizzi
- Jack Stoddard
- Barry Sullivan
- Len Wharton

== Season-by-season results ==
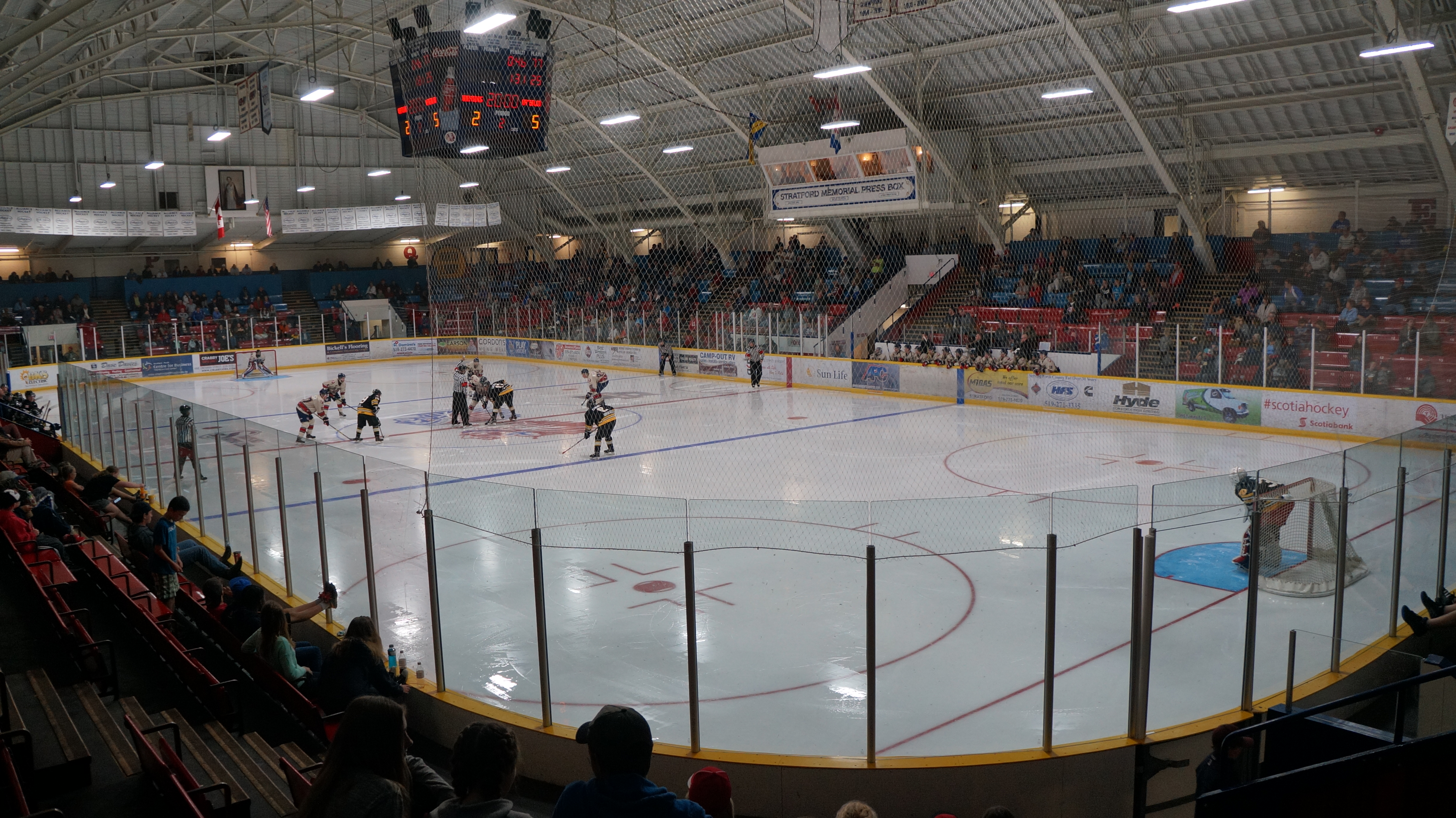
Stratford Arena

Regular season and playoffs results:

Legend: GP = Games played, W = Wins, L = Losses, T = Ties, Pts = Points, GF = Goals for, GA = Goals against

Memorial Cup champions	League champions	League finalists

Season	Regular season									Playoffs
Season	GP	W	L	T	Pts	Pct	GF	GA	Finish	Playoffs
1942–43	25	7	9	9	24	0.438	75	78	4th OHA	Lost quarterfinal (Brantford Lions) 2–0
1943–44	25	7	16	2	16	0.304	99	154	5th Group 2	Did not qualify
Did not operate from 1944 to 1946
1946–47	36	22	14	0	44	0.611	164	108	4th OHA	Lost quarterfinal (Galt Red Wings) 2–0
1947–48	36	21	13	2	44	0.618	151	134	4th OHA	Lost quarterfinal (Barrie Flyers) 2–0
1948–49	48	25	21	2	52	0.543	190	200	5th OHA	Lost quarterfinal (Toronto Marlboros) 2–1
1949–50	48	14	31	3	31	0.311	165	218	7th OHA	Did not qualify
1950–51	54	20	28	6	46	0.417	200	230	7th OHA	Lost quarterfinal (Toronto Marlboros) 3–0
