= 1945–46 IHL season =

North American ice hockey season

The 1945–46 IHL season was the first season of the International Hockey League, a North American minor professional league. Four teams participated in the regular season, and the Detroit Auto Club won the Turner Cup.

== Regular season ==
	GP	W	L	T	Pts	GF	GA
Detroit Bright's Goodyears	15	9	3	3	21	90	70
Windsor Gotfredsons	15	8	4	3	19	90	72
Detroit Auto Club	15	8	7	0	16	82	81
Windsor Spitfires	15	1	12	2	4	50	89

== Turner Cup-Playoffs ==
Turner-Cup-Semifinals
1	Detroit Bright's Goodyears
Bye
2	Windsor	1
3	Detroit Auto Club	1*

Turner-Cup-Final
1	Detroit Bright's Goodyears	1
3	Detroit Auto Club	2
