= 1950–51 IHL season =

North American ice hockey season

The 1950–51 IHL season was the sixth season of the International Hockey League, a North American minor professional league. Six teams participated in the regular season, and the Toledo Mercurys won the Turner Cup.

== Regular season ==
	GP	W	L	T	GF	GA	Pts
Grand Rapids Rockets	56	39	11	6	274	165	84
Toledo Mercurys	56	35	15	6	290	174	76
Chatham Maroons	52	25	23	4	211	215	59
Sarnia Sailors	52	24	19	9	226	191	59
Detroit Auto Club	52	10	32	10	136	238	31
Detroit Hettche	52	6	39	7	112	266	19

== Turner Cup-Playoffs ==
Turner-Cup-Semifinals
1	Grand Rapids Rockets	3
3	Chatham Maroons	0
2	Toledo Mercurys	3
4	Sarnia Sailors	0

Turner-Cup-Final
1	Grand Rapids Rockets	1
2	Toledo Mercurys	4
