= Detroit Hettche =

American minor-league professional ice hockey team

The Detroit Hettche were a minor league professional ice hockey team based in Detroit, Michigan, and played at the Detroit Olympia. The team originated in Windsor, Ontario as the Windsor Spitfires and were one of the four founding members of the International Hockey League in 1945. In 1947, the team was renamed Windsor Hettche Spitfires after its sponsor, Detroit auto dealer and Michigan state boxing commissioner John Hettche. The team moved across the river to Detroit in 1949. It played seven seasons total, folding in 1952.

== Season-by-season results ==
Season	Team	Games	Won	Lost	Tied	Points	Pct %	Goals for	Goals against	Standings	Playoffs
1945–46	Windsor Spitfires	15	1	12	2	4	0.133	?	?	4th, IHL	Did not qualify
1946–47	Windsor Spitfires	28	14	10	4	32	0.571	162	141	2nd, IHL	Won semifinal (Detroit Metal Mouldings) 2-1; Won Turner Cup final (Detroit Bright's Goodyears) 3-0
1947–48	Windsor Hettche Spitfires	30	19	10	1	39	0.650	151	105	1st, IHL	Won semifinal (Detroit Metal Mouldings) 2-1; Lost Turner Cup final (Toledo Mercurys) 4-1
1948–49	Windsor Hettche Spitfires	31	15	11	5	35	0.565	152	144	4th, North	Won quarterfinal (Detroit Jerry Lynch) 2-0; Won semifinal (Detroit Auto Club) 4-0; Won Turner Cup final (Toledo Mercurys) 4-3
1949–50	Detroit Hettche	40	15	21	4	34	0.425	157	191	4th, IHL	Lost semifinal (Sarnia Sailors) 3-0
1950–51	Detroit Hettche	52	6	39	7	19	0.183	112	226	6th, IHL	Did not qualify
1951–52	Detroit Hettche	48	10	35	3	23	0.240	138	232	5th, IHL	Did not qualify
Totals		244	80	138	26	186	0.381	---	---		
