= Akron Americans =

The Akron Americans were a minor league professional ice hockey team from Akron, Ohio, that played in the International Hockey League's south division during the 1948–49 season. The Americans were the first fully professional ice hockey team from Akron. The team replaced the semi-professional Akron Stars who played in the Ohio State Hockey League from 1946 to 1948.

== Results ==
| Season | Games | Won | Lost | Tied | Points | Winning % | Goals for | Goals against | Standing |
|---|---|---|---|---|---|---|---|---|---|
| 1948–49 | 32 | 4 | 25 | 3 | 11 | 0.172 | 111 | 200 | 5th, South division |
