= William Allman Memorial Arena =

Ice hockey arena in Stratford, Ontario

Coordinates: 43.374224°N 80.975992°W

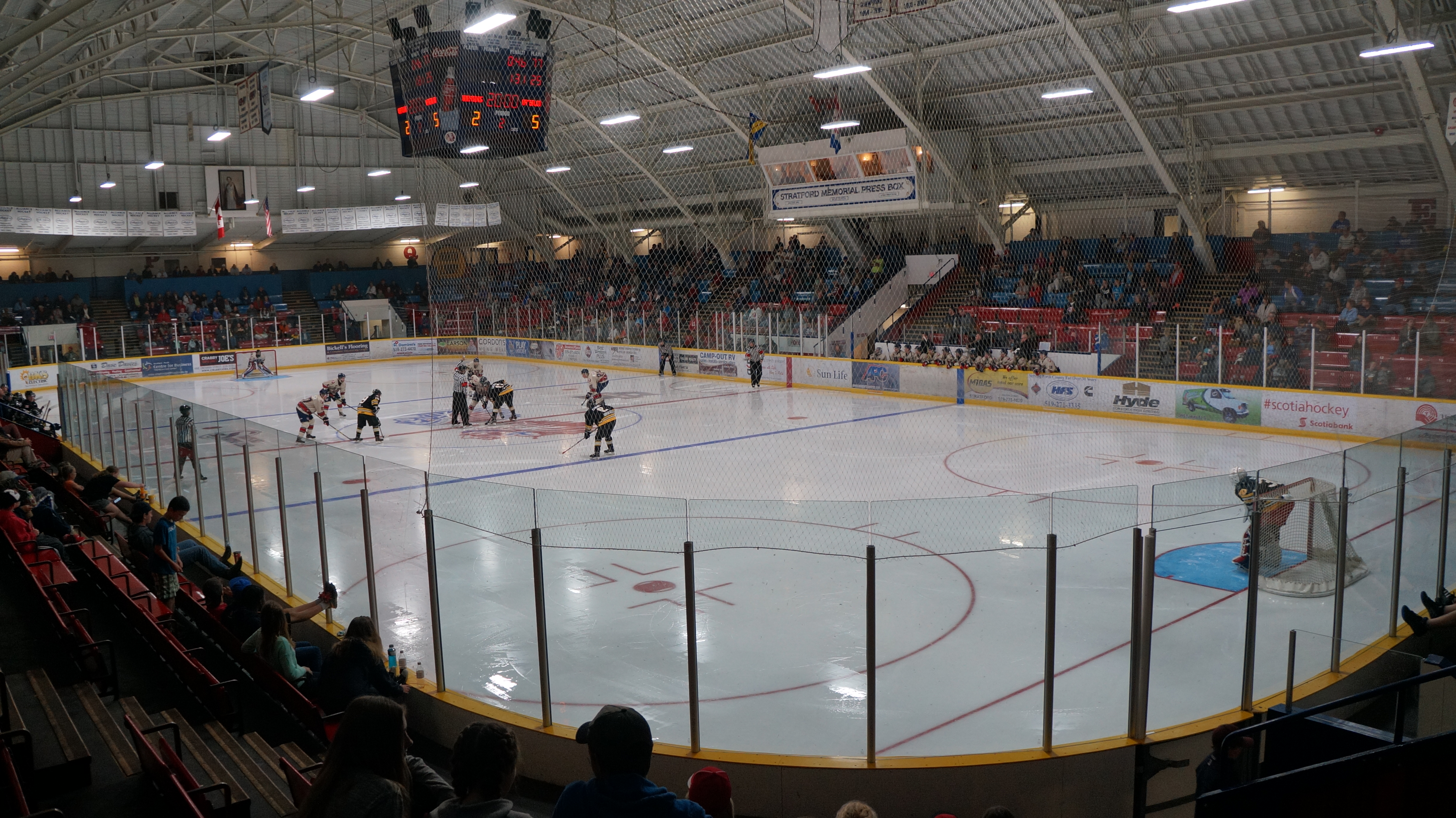
- Interactive map of William Allman Memorial Arena
- Location: 15 Morenz Dr, Stratford, Ontario, Canada N5A 1A1: Tel: (519) 271-2161
- Owner: City of Stratford
- Capacity: Hockey 2,828

Construction
- Opened: 1924

Tenant
- Stratford Kroehlers (1942-1944, 1946-1951) Stratford Warriors (1978-Present)

The William Allman Memorial Arena is an ice hockey arena in Stratford, Ontario. It is also one of the world's oldest continuously operated arenas. Opened in 1924 as the Classic City Arena then was purchased by the City in 1941 and renamed the Stratford Arena. It was given its current name in December 1996 to honour long-time arena manager William (Bill) Allman.

The arena has undergone many renovations over the past 100 years but has been open and operational for every hockey season since 1924, making it one of the world's oldest continuously operating arenas. In September 2009, the arena received heritage designation by the City of Stratford under Part IV (Municipal Heritage Designation) of the Ontario Heritage Act.

This arena is home to the Jr. B Stratford Warriors (formerly the Stratford Cullitons) as well as senior hockey team the Stratford Fighting Irish. It also hosts various minor hockey games and is the home arena of the Stratford Skating Club.

The arena has a long and colourful history. It hosted a Howie Morenz benefit game featuring the Montreal Canadiens in 1937 following Morenz's death, was the location of Wayne Gretzky's first-ever minor hockey goal, hosted CBC's 'Hockey Day in Canada' in 2010, and saw many NHLers launch their NHL careers as juniors with the Cullitons, including Mark Bell, Rob Blake, Kevin Dahl, Louie DeBrusk, Greg de Vries, Boyd Devereaux, Nelson Emerson, Jeff Halpern, Rem Murray, Eddie Olczyk, Mike Peluso, Chris Pronger, Garth Snow and Tim Taylor.

To mark its 100th birthday, a book about the arena was published in 2024.
