= Max Mekilok =

Canadian ice hockey player

- Born: August 31, 1934 (age 90); Fort William, Ontario, Canada
- Height: 6 ft 0 in (183 cm)
- Weight: 170 lb (77 kg; 12 st 2 lb)
- Position: Center
- Shot: Right
- Played for: Spokane Comets; Rochester Americans
- Playing career: 1951–1969

Eugene (Max) Mekilok (born August 31, 1934) is a Canadian former professional hockey player who played 343 games in the Western Hockey League for the Spokane Comets. He also played 18 games for the Rochester Americans in the American Hockey League.
