= Fred Huber =

American ice hockey executive

Fred A. Huber Jr. was an American hockey executive who was publicity director of the Detroit Red Wings and one of the founders of the International Hockey League.

== Early life ==
Huber graduated from the University of Michigan in 1934. He was a writer for the school's student newspaper – The Michigan Daily.

== Hockey ==
Huber was publicity director for the Detroit Red Wings from 1941 to 1958. He was also an analyst alongside Budd Lynch for Red Wings telecasts. In 1945, Huber helped Red Wings general manager Jack Adams organize the International Hockey League. The IHL's Fred A. Huber Trophy was named in his honour. Huber also helped create the Michigan Amateur Hockey Association and was the organization's first president.

== Later life ==
After leaving the Red Wings, Huber continued to work in public relations in the Detroit area. His wife, May Huber, was a member of the Wayne County board of supervisors. He retired to Sun City, Arizona, where he died on November 26, 1995.
