= Huntington Hornets =

- City: Huntington, West Virginia
- League: International Hockey League
- Founded: 1956
- Folded: 1957
- Home arena: Veterans Memorial Fieldhouse
- Colors: red, white, black
- Owners: Ernie Berg, et al
- Head coach: Eddie Olson

Franchise history
- 1950–1956: Grand Rapids Rockets
- 1956–1957: Huntington Hornets
- 1957–1960: Louisville Rebels

The Huntington Hornets were a professional ice hockey team that played in Huntington, West Virginia as a member of the International Hockey League during the 1956–57 season. The team was relocated to Huntington from Grand Rapids, Michigan where they played as the Grand Rapids Rockets. The Huntington Hornets played their home games at the 4,100 seat Veterans Memorial Fieldhouse. They finished third overall in the International Hockey League's 1956–57 season. The team suffered from low attendance, prompting owner Ernie Berg to begin seeking for a new home as early as December, 1956. Local promoter Dick Deutsch attempted to keep the team in Huntington twice by seeking local investments. Ultimately, the attempts fell short, and the team was slated for suspension of operations or relocation. The IHL eventually approved relocation of the franchise to Louisville, Kentucky, where the team was rebranded as the Rebels.

== Standings ==
Year	GP	W	L	T	PTS	GF	GA	Pct	Standings
1956–1957	60	26	30	4	56	180	188	.467	3 of 6

== Roster ==
Player	Pos	Birthplace
Jim Campbell	C	Timmins, Ontario
Roger Christian	LW	Warroad, Minnesota
Lou Crowdis	G	Sainte-Anne-de-Beaupré, Quebec
Don Davidson	C	Ottawa, Ontario
Doug Falby	D	
Bill Fillman	D	
Gerry Frenette	D	Hancock, Michigan
Steve Gaber	RW	Cupar, Saskatchewan
George Hayes	C	Toronto, Ontario
Joe Ingoldsby	RW	
Ron Johnson	RW	Marquette, Michigan
Morris Lallo	D	Montreal, Quebec
Rod McElroy	C	St. Thomas, Ontario
Mike Narduzzi	LW	Fort William, Ontario
Eddie Olson	LW/HC	Hancock, Michigan
Ray Parker		
Eric Pogue	RW	Scarborough, Ontario
Len Ronson	LW	Brantford, Ontario
Garnet Schai	D	Wilkie, Saskatchewan
Ronnie Spong	C	Toronto, Ontario
Len Thornson	C	Winnipeg, Manitoba
John Ticalo	D	Timmins, Ontario
Bob Wilson	D	Sudbury, Ontario
