= 1951–52 IHL season =

North American ice hockey season

The 1951–52 IHL season was the seventh season of the International Hockey League, a North American minor professional league. Five teams participated in the regular season, and the Toledo Mercurys won the Turner Cup.

== Regular season ==
	GP	W	L	T	GF	GA	Pts
Grand Rapids Rockets	48	29	13	6	213	156	64
Toledo Mercurys	48	24	18	6	210	192	54
Troy Bruins	48	23	19	6	211	180	52
Chatham Maroons	48	22	23	3	206	218	47
Detroit Hettche	48	10	35	3	138	232	23

== Turner Cup-Playoffs ==
Turner-Cup-Semifinals
1	Grand Rapids Rockets	4
3	Troy Bruins	3
2	Toledo Mercurys	4
4	Chatham Maroons	0

Turner-Cup-Final
1	Grand Rapids Rockets	2
2	Toledo Mercurys	4
