= Marion Barons =

Former minor-league professional ice hockey team based in Ohio

The Marion Barons were a minor league professional ice hockey team in the International Hockey League during the 1953–54 season. The Barons were based in Marion, Ohio, played at Veterans Memorial Coliseum, and were a farm team of the Cleveland Barons. The Barons placed second in the league their only season, and featured four players who at one point in their careers reached the National Hockey League; Armand Delmonte, Ott Heller, and Tony Poeta.

== Results ==
Season	Games	Won	Lost	Tied	Points	Winning %	Goals for	Goals against	Standing
1953–54	64	40	24	0	80	0.625	279	207	2nd of 9 teams
