= Muncie Flyers (ice hockey) =

The Muncie Flyers were a minor league professional ice hockey team in the International Hockey League during the 1948–49 season. The Flyers were based in Muncie, Indiana, and led by player/coach Henry Coupe.

== Results ==
| Season | Games | Won | Lost | Tied | Points | Winning % | Goals for | Goals against | Standing |
|---|---|---|---|---|---|---|---|---|---|
| 1948–49 | 32 | 9 | 19 | 4 | 22 | 0.344 | 103 | 168 | 4th, South division |
