= 1958–59 IHL season =

North American ice hockey season

The 1958–59 IHL season was the 14th season of the International Hockey League, a North American minor professional league. Five teams participated in the regular season, and the Louisville Rebels won the Turner Cup.

== Regular season ==
	GP	W	L	T	GF	GA	Pts
Louisville Rebels	60	35	24	1	280	197	71
Fort Wayne Komets	60	32	27	1	236	213	65
Troy Bruins	60	30	28	2	245	283	62
Indianapolis Chiefs	60	26	30	4	231	247	56
Toledo Mercurys	60	22	36	2	196	248	46

== Turner Cup-Playoffs ==
Turner Cup-Semifinals
1	Louisville Rebels	4
3	Troy Bruins	1
2	Fort Wayne Komets	4
4	Indianapolis Chiefs	1

Turner Cup-Final
1	Louisville Rebels	4
2	Fort Wayne Komets	2
