= Toledo Sports Arena =

Demolished sports arena in Toledo, Ohio

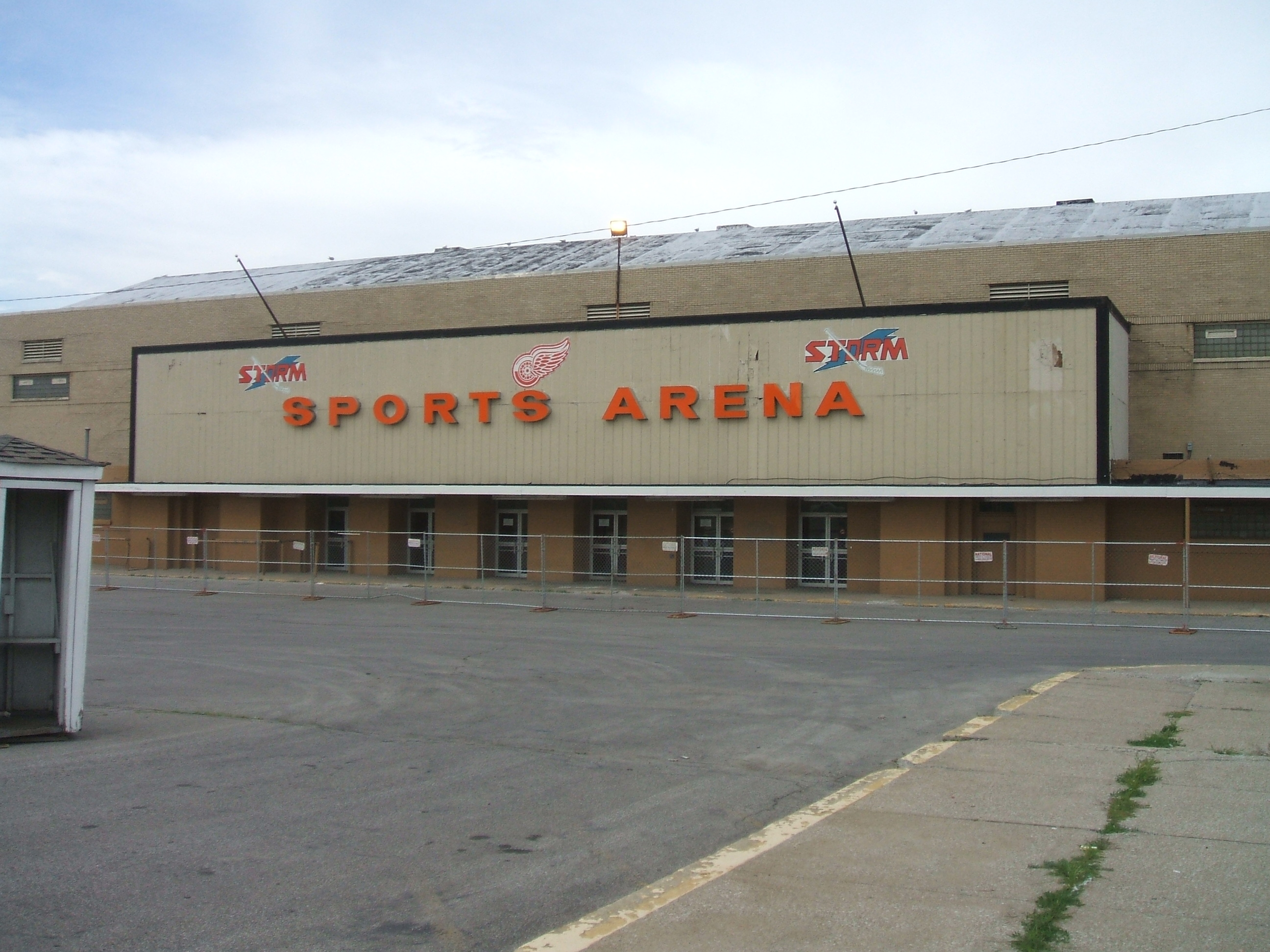
- Interactive map of Toledo Sports Arena
- Address: 1 Main Street
- Location: Toledo, Ohio
- Coordinates: 41°39′3″N 83°31′27″W
- Owner: City of Toledo
- Operator: ASM Global
- Capacity: Ice hockey: 5,230; Concerts:6,500; Stage Shows and small Concerts:4,400; Boxing and Wrestling: 8,250

Construction
- Opened: November 13, 1947
- Closed: April 28, 2007
- Demolished: August 7, 2007

Tenants
- Toledo Mercurys (IHL) (1947–1962); Toledo Blades/Hornets (IHL) (1963–1974); Toledo Goaldiggers (IHL) (1974–1986); Toledo Storm (ECHL) (1991–2007)

Toledo Sports Arena was a 5,230-seat multi-purpose arena at 1 Main Street, Toledo, Ohio. It was built in 1947 and demolished in 2007.

As a concert venue, it seated 6,500, for theater concerts and stage shows, 4,400 and for boxing and wrestling, 8,250; also, the arena was 33 2/3 ft (10.3 m) tall. Attached to the arena was an exhibit hall that accommodated 30,000 square feet (3,000 m^{2}) of space; when combined with the 20,000 square feet (2,000 m^{2}) of arena floor space, a total of 50,000 square feet (5,000 m^{2}) of exhibit and trade show space. The exhibit hall accommodated up to 2,500, for concerts and meetings and 1,800, for banquets. In addition, there were three meeting rooms, totaling 5,000 square feet (500 m^{2}) of space.

The Sports Arena was home to the following ice hockey teams:

- Toledo Mercurys (IHL) (1947–1962)
- Toledo Blades/Hornets (IHL) (1963–1974)
- Toledo Goaldiggers (IHL) (1974–1986)
- Toledo Storm (ECHL) (1991–2007)

The Sports Arena was the inspiration for the Yes song, "Our Song," which was written after their July 30, 1977 performance in which the arena's interior temperature reached 126 °F (52 °C).

The arena played host to the politically motivated Vote for Change Tour on October 2, 2004, featuring performances by Gob Roberts, Death Cab for Cutie and Pearl Jam, with special guests Peter Frampton, Pegi Young and Neil Young.

Local promoter Brad McDonald held the Arena's final event on April 28, 2007, an "Extreme Toughman" event, a mixed martial art competition much like the UFC. Demolition of the Sports Arena took place in August of that year. The new arena, Huntington Center, was completed in October 2009, on the opposite side of the Maumee River, placing it in the center of downtown Toledo.
