= Chatham Maroons (IHL) =

- City: Chatham, Ontario
- League: IHL 1949–1952; OHA Senior "A" 1952–1963; IHL 1963–1964
- Operated: 1949–1964
- Home arena: Chatham Memorial Arena
- Colours: Maroon, Brown, and White
- Head coach: Jack Stewart, John Horeck, Ted Power, Gus Mortson

Championships
- Turner Cups: 1
- OHA Cups: 1
- Allan Cups: 1

The Chatham Maroons are a defunct Canadian semi-professional and amateur senior ice hockey team. The team played in the City of Chatham, Ontario, Canada and participated in the International Hockey League on two occasions and the OHA Senior A Hockey League in between.

== History ==
In 1949, the Chatham St. Clair Maroons were formed, playing in the newly built Chatham Memorial Arena. Competing in the International Hockey League, they went on to win a Turner Cup by defeating the Sarnia Sailors in a best of seven series. The team went on to defeat the Toledo Buckeyes for the Eastern US Amateur Championship, winning a best of 3 series in straight games. The team was unable to financially manage a trip to Spokane, Washington to compete for the US Amateur Championship.

The Maroons later played in the Ontario Hockey Association (OHA) as a member of the OHA Senior A League. The team won the J. Ross Robertson Cup as league champions in 1956 and 1960, and were finalists in 1962 and 1963.

The Chatham Maroons were the winners of the 1960 Allan Cup, emblematic of the top senior hockey team in all of Canada. The same year the club played couple of friendlies in Moscow with the collective team of the Soviet clubs where they won the first meeting 5:3 and lost the second one 2:11. The Maroons defeated the Trail Smoke Eaters 4-games-to-none with one tie to clinch the championship. The winner of the award earned the right, as the country's top amateur team, to compete for Canada at the Ice Hockey World Championships a season after winning. The Maroons opted out and were replaced by Trail, who won the gold medal.

== Season-by-season results ==
| Season | GP | W | L | T | GF | GA | P | Results | Playoffs |
| 1949–50 | 40 | 19 | 18 | 3 | 152 | 148 | 41 | 3rd IHL | Won league |
| 1950–51 | 52 | 25 | 23 | 4 | 211 | 215 | 59 | 3rd IHL | |
| 1951–52 | 48 | 22 | 23 | 3 | 206 | 218 | 47 | 4th IHL | |
| 1952–53 | 48 | 21 | 26 | 1 | 191 | 196 | 43 | 5th OHA Sr. A | |
| 1953–54 | 56 | 22 | 31 | 3 | 160 | 204 | 47 | 6th OHA Sr. A | |
| 1954–55 | 50 | 17 | 30 | 3 | 185 | 238 | 37 | 5th OHA Sr. A | |
| 1955–56 | 48 | 21 | 24 | 3 | 192 | 225 | 45 | 4th OHA Sr. A | Won league |
| 1956–57 | 52 | 28 | 22 | 2 | 218 | 183 | 58 | 4th OHA Sr. A | |
| 1957–58 | 60 | 21 | 34 | 5 | 192 | 221 | 47 | 10th OHA Sr. A | |
| 1958–59 | 54 | 37 | 15 | 2 | 234 | 183 | 76 | 1st OHA Sr. A | |
| 1959–60 | 54 | 23 | 27 | 4 | 229 | 249 | 54 | 3rd OHA Sr. A | Won league, won Allan Cup |
| 1960–61 | 40 | 20 | 16 | 4 | 174 | 148 | 44 | 3rd OHA Sr. A | |
| 1961–62 | 34 | 15 | 17 | 2 | 170 | 143 | 32 | 5th OHA Sr. A | Lost final |
| 1962–63 | 40 | 24 | 13 | 3 | 229 | 139 | 51 | 2nd OHA Sr. A | Lost final |
| 1963–64 | 70 | 21 | 44 | 5 | 211 | 278 | 47 | 7th IHL | |
| IHL Totals | 210 | 87 | 105 | 15 | 780 | 859 | 194 | – | 1 Turner Cup |
| OHA Sr A Totals | 536 | 249 | 255 | 32 | 2,174 | 2,129 | 534 | – | 1 Allan Cup, 1 league regular season Championship |
