= Sarnia Sailors =

- City: Sarnia, Ontario
- League: IHL 1949–1951; OHA Senior "A" 1951–1954
- Operated: 1949–1954
- Home arena: Sarnia Arena (capacity: 2,302)
- Head coach: Norman Tustin

The Sarnia Sailors are a defunct Canadian semi-professional and amateur senior ice hockey team. The team played in the City of Sarnia, Ontario, Canada and participated in the International Hockey League and the OHA Senior A Hockey League afterwards.

== History ==
The Sarnia Sailors began as an expansion team in 1949 with the Chatham Maroons in the International Hockey League. That year, the two upstarts dominated the league's playoffs and ended up in a one-on-one showdown for the Turner Cup. The Maroons came out on top, winning the series in seven games. From that point on, the Sailors demise began. They played one more season in the IHL before dropping to the amateur ranks in the OHA Senior A Hockey League. The Sailors were finalists for the J. Ross Robertson Cup in the 1950–51 season.

Meeting a similar talent lever in the OHA, the Sailors struggled for three seasons before folding mid-season in 1953–54. The Sailors never stepped back on the ice. The team name was shared by the local Junior "B" hockey team. In 1954, after the Sr. Sailors folded, the team changed their names to the Sarnia Legionnaires. The Legionnaires folded mid-season as well, in 1969–70.

== Season-by-season results ==
Season	GP	W	L	T	GF	GA	P	Results	Playoffs
1949–50	40	26	11	3	219	136	55	1st IHL	Lost Final
1950–51	52	24	19	9	226	191	59	4th IHL	
1951–52	50	18	29	3	183	235	39	6th OHA Sr. A	
1952–53	48	20	27	1	177	215	41	6th OHA Sr. A	
1953–54	22	4	15	3	69	107	11	8th OHA Sr. A	
IHL Totals	92	50	30	12	445	327	114	–	–
OHA Sr. A Totals	120	42	71	7	429	557	91	–	–
