= Detroit Auto Club =

Former minor league professional ice hockey team in the International Hockey League

- City: Detroit, Michigan
- League: International Hockey League
- Founded: 1945
- Folded: 1951
- Home arena: Olympia Stadium (capacity: 15,000)

Championships
- Turner Cups: 1

The Detroit Auto Club was a minor league professional ice hockey team, and one of the four founding members of the International Hockey League in 1945, and operated until 1951. They played their home games at Olympia Stadium in Detroit, Michigan. The Detroit Auto Club won the inaugural Turner Cup, as playoff champions, beating the Detroit Bright's Goodyears two game to one.

== Standings ==
Year	GP	W	L	T	PTS	GF	GA	Pct	Standings	Playoffs
1945–1946	15	8	7	0	16	82	81	.533	3 of 4	Won Semifinals Windsor Gotfredsons 2-1, Won Turner Cup Finals Detroit Bright's Goodyears 2-1
1946–1947	28	7	20	1	15	113	156	.268	5 of 5	Did not qualify
1947–1948	30	13	16	1	27	161	155	.450	5 of 6	Did not qualify
1948–1949	31	17	11	3	39	146	130	.563	2 of 5	Won Quarterfinals Detroit Bright's Goodyears 2-0, Lost Semifinals Windsor Hettche 4-0
1949–1950	40	19	14	7	45	170	139	.563	2 of 5	Lost Semifinals Chatham Maroons 3-1
1950–1951	52	10	32	10	31	136	238	.298	5 of 6	Did not qualify
Totals	196	74	100	22	173	808	899	.441		
