= Detroit Bright's Goodyears =

The Detroit Bright's Goodyears were a minor league professional ice hockey team, and one of the four founding members of the International Hockey League in 1945, and operated until 1949. They played their home games at Olympia Stadium in Detroit, Michigan.

== Standings ==
Year	GP	W	L	T	PTS	GF	GA	Pct	Standings	Playoffs
1945–1946	15	9	3	3	21	90	70	.700	1 of 4	Lost Turner Cup Finals Detroit Auto Club 2–1
1946–1947	28	13	9	6	32	154	128	.571	3 of 5	Won Semifinals Windsor Staffords 2–0, Lost Turner Cup Finals Windsor Spitfires 3–0
1947–1948	30	13	14	3	29	157	149	.483	4 of 6	Lost Semifinals Toledo Mercurys 2–0
1948–1949	31	8	16	7	28	135	154	.452	5 of 6	Lost Quarterfinals Detroit Auto Club 2–0
Totals	104	43	42	19	110	536	501	.529		
