= Troy Bruins =

Troy Bruins
Founded	1951
Home ice	Hobart Arena
Based in	Troy, Ohio
Colors	Black, Gold and White
League	International Hockey League
Owner	Ken Wilson
General Manager	Ken Wilson
Coach(s)	Norm McAtee; 1951–1954; Nellie Podolski; 1955 -1957

The Troy Bruins were an International Hockey League team based in Troy, Ohio that played from 1951 to 1959 at the Hobart Arena. Notable players were Brian Kilrea and Larry King Kwong. Goaltender Bill Tibbs won the James Norris Memorial Trophy IHL for the fewest goals against during the 1955–1956 regular season.

The Bruins were relocated by owner Ken Wilson in 1959, and admitted to the Eastern Hockey League, to play as the Greensboro Generals in the recently built Greensboro Coliseum.

For the 2008-2009 season, the ECHL's Dayton Bombers wore special Troy Bruins throwback jerseys while playing six games at Hobart Arena, before auctioning them off for charity.
