= Grand Rapids Rockets =

Minor league hockey team in Michigan, USA

The Grand Rapids Rockets are a defunct International Hockey League team. They were members of the IHL from the 1950–1951 season to 1955–1956 season. They were based in Grand Rapids, Michigan and played their home games in Stadium Arena. The team had previously been a member of the Eastern Amateur Hockey League for the 1949–1950 season, before moving to the IHL. Their team colors were blue and gold.

After the 1955–1956 season, the team moved to Huntington, West Virginia and became the Huntington Hornets. They played one season in the IHL before folding.

== Standings ==
Year	GP	W	L	T	PTS	GF	GA	Pct	Standings	Playoffs
1950–1951	56	39	11	6	84	274	165	.750	1 of 6	Won semifinals Chatham Maroons 3-0, lost Turner Cup Finals Toledo Mercurys 4-1
1951–1952	48	29	13	6	64	213	156	.667	1 of 5	Won semifinals Troy Bruins 4-3, lost Turner Cup Finals Toledo Mercurys 4-2
1952–1953	60	27	32	1	55	231	257	.458	4 of 6	Won semifinals Troy Bruins 4-2, lost Turner Cup Finals Cincinnati Mohawks 4-0
1953–1954	64	29	32	3	64	252	274	.477	7 of 9	Did not qualify
1954–1955	60	28	31	1	57	199	215	.475	4 of 6	Lost semifinals Troy Bruins 3-1
1955–1956	60	24	33	3	51	198	237	.425	5 of 6	Did not qualify
Totals	348	176	152	20	372	1367	1304	.534		
