= International Hockey League =

1945–2001 North American ice hockey league

- Sport: Ice hockey
- Founded: 1945
- Folded: 2001
- Countries: United States; Canada
- Most titles: Cincinnati Mohawks (5)

The International Hockey League (IHL) was a minor professional ice hockey league in the United States and Canada that operated from 1945 to 2001. The IHL served as the National Hockey League (NHL)'s alternate farm system to the American Hockey League (AHL). After 56 years of operation, financial instability led to the league's demise. Six of the surviving seven teams merged into the AHL in 2001.

== History ==
=== Early years ===
The IHL was formed on December 5, 1945, in a three-hour meeting at the Norton Palmer Hotel in Windsor, Ontario. In attendance were Jack Adams (coach of the Detroit Red Wings), Fred Huber (Red Wings public relations), Frank Gallagher (amateur hockey organizer in Detroit and Windsor), Lloyd Pollock (Windsor hockey pioneer), Gerald McHugh (Windsor lawyer), Len Hebert, Len Loree and Bill Beckman. The league began operations in the 1945–46 IHL season with four teams in Windsor and Detroit, and operated as semi-professional league.

In 1947, a team from Toledo, Ohio, joined the league, and the following year the IHL expanded significantly, with teams in four additional U.S. cities. The expansion did not take hold, and for 1949–50, the league was back down to teams in Detroit and Windsor as well as two nearby Canadian cities, Sarnia, Ontario, and Chatham, Ontario. Windsor dropped out in 1950, and expansion into the U.S. began again, with Toledo rejoining the league and new teams in Grand Rapids, Michigan (1950), Troy, Ohio, (1951), Cincinnati (1952), Fort Wayne, Indiana (1952), and Milwaukee (1952). At the same time, the last Canadian team left the league in 1952, when the Chatham Maroons pulled out. Three new U.S. cities were added in 1953. The league would expand and shrink between five and nine teams through the 1950s, with another major expansion in 1959. In the 1962–63 season, the IHL played an interlocking schedule with the NHL-owned Eastern Professional Hockey League, which itself folded after its 1962–63 season. After 11 seasons as a strictly U.S.-based league, the IHL admitted two Canadian teams in 1963, with the Windsor Bulldogs and the return of the Chatham Maroons. Both teams dropped out after one season, however, and the league would not have a Canadian team again until 1996.

=== Major market expansion ===
Bill Beagan served as commissioner of the IHL from 1969 to 1978. The Canadian Press cited him for turning around the league's financial situation and making it a top-tier development system for future NHL talent.

Starting in the late 1960s, the IHL's quality of play significantly improved. By the mid-1970s it was on par with the American Hockey League (AHL), the longtime top feeder league for the National Hockey League. Many IHL teams became the top farm teams of NHL teams. In 1984, the league absorbed a few surviving members of the Central Hockey League, which had ceased operations.

In 1985, the league adopted the shootout to determine tie games in place of traditional overtime. The NHL would begin using the shootout to avoid tie games in 2005.

Beginning in the late 1980s and continuing into the mid-90s, the IHL expanded or re-located existing franchises into major U.S. markets such as Atlanta, Cincinnati, Cleveland, Denver, Houston, Indianapolis, Kansas City, Las Vegas, Minneapolis–Saint Paul, Orlando, Phoenix, Salt Lake City, San Antonio, San Diego, and San Francisco. Many of these markets had been previously served by the defunct World Hockey Association or abandoned by the NHL. The IHL also entered markets that had existing NHL teams, such as Chicago, Detroit, and Los Angeles. In 1996, the IHL moved its Atlanta and Minneapolis–Saint Paul franchises to Quebec City and Winnipeg, respectively, restoring the league's Canadian presence and filling the void left by the departure of the NHL's Quebec Nordiques and the original Winnipeg Jets.

The minimum requirements for an IHL expansion team in 1995 were "a 10,000-seat arena, a population base of one million, and a $6 million franchise fee." As the league expanded into larger markets, many of the smaller-market teams (such as Fort Wayne, Peoria, Muskegon, Kalamazoo and Flint) left the IHL and joined lower-level leagues.

=== Decline and collapse ===
The IHL's expansion into NHL markets put a strain on relationships between the leagues. There was some speculation that the IHL was intending to compete directly with the NHL, especially when a lockout in 1994–95 threatened to wipe out the NHL season. However, in the 1995–96 season, the IHL's "soft" salary cap was just $1.5 million, while the lowest NHL team payroll that season was $11.4 million. A Fall 1994 article in Sports Illustrated praising the IHL and mocking the NHL only fueled the fire. In said article, IHL officials detailed plans to continue expanding the league to large markets in North America, as well as, "a six-team European league with franchises in England, Switzerland, Italy, Austria, Sweden and France."

In response, many NHL clubs shifted their affiliations to the AHL, and by 1997–98, only four of 18 IHL teams had NHL affiliations. With the loss of subsidized salaries, high expansion fees (by the end the league was charging as much as $8 million US for new teams), exploding travel costs and the NHL itself moving back into some of its markets, the league's rapid expansion proved a critical strain, and it folded after the 2000–01 season.

Six IHL franchises (the Chicago Wolves, Grand Rapids Griffins, Houston Aeros, Utah Grizzlies, Milwaukee Admirals and Manitoba Moose) were admitted into the AHL as expansion teams for the 2001–02 season. Between them, they have played for the AHL Calder Cup seven times, winning four—including three in a row after their arrival. As well, the Cincinnati Cyclones was readmitted to the East Coast Hockey League, which hosted the team from 1990 to 1992 before it moved to the IHL. The Orlando Solar Bears (the final IHL playoff champions) and the Kansas City Blades were not admitted into the AHL because their owner, Rich DeVos, who also owned the Griffins, was allowed to own only one AHL franchise. The league's other two teams, the Cleveland Lumberjacks and Detroit Vipers, ceased operations along with the league.

Two former IHL teams that moved to the AHL have since relocated: the Utah Grizzlies moved to Cleveland, Ohio, to become the Lake Erie Monsters (rebranded as Cleveland Monsters in 2016) in 2007 and the Houston Aeros moved to Des Moines, Iowa, to become the Iowa Wild in 2013. A third team, the Manitoba Moose, temporarily relocated to St. John's, Newfoundland and Labrador to become the St. John's IceCaps from 2011 to 2015. Three former franchises have been relaunched in lower-tier leagues since the IHL's demise. The Utah Grizzlies name was revived by the former Lexington Men O' War of the ECHL when they moved, and the Orlando Solar Bears restarted as an ECHL expansion team. The Peoria Rivermen have had three more franchises with an expansion team in the East Coast Hockey League from 1996 to 2005, a relocated Worcester IceCats in the American Hockey League from 2005 to 2013, and a fourth incarnation of the Peoria Rivermen subsequently launched in the Southern Professional Hockey League in 2013.

== Trophies and awards ==
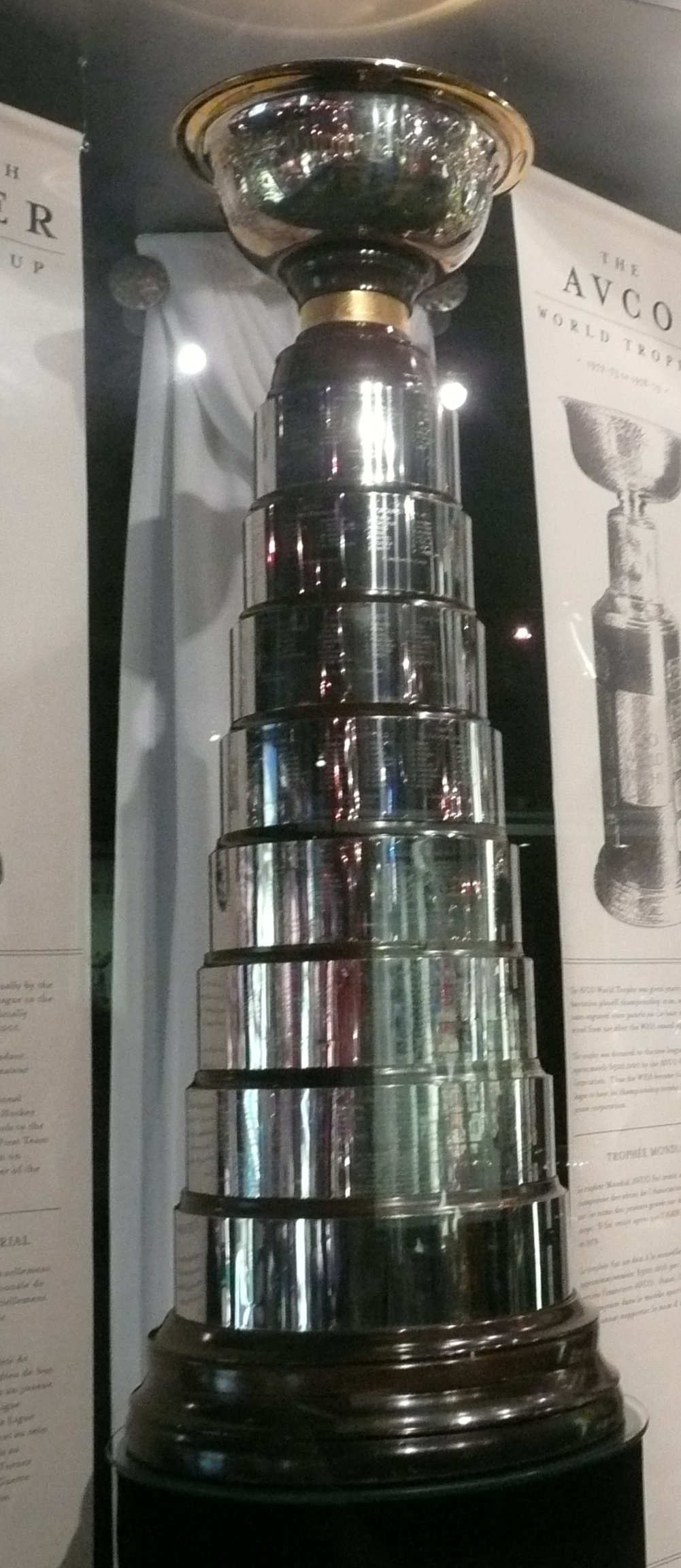
The Turner Cup was the championship trophy of the International Hockey League.

Award name	Seasons	Description
Turner Cup	1945–2001	League playoff champions
Fred A. Huber Trophy	1945–2001	Regular season champions
Commissioner's Trophy	1984–2001	Coach of the year
Leo P. Lamoureux Memorial Trophy	1946–2001	Top point scorer. Known as "George H. Wilkinson Trophy" (1946-1960).
James Gatschene Memorial Trophy	1946–2001	MVP / Sportsmanship
Norman R. "Bud" Poile Trophy	1988–2001	Playoffs MVP
Gary F. Longman Memorial Trophy	1961–2001	Rookie of the year Known as "Leading Rookie Award" (1961–1967).
Ken McKenzie Trophy	1977–2001	American-born rookie of the year
Governor's Trophy	1964–2001	Best defenseman. Known as "Larry D. Gordon Trophy" (1998–2001).
James Norris Memorial Trophy	1955–2001	Goaltenders with lowest GAA.
John Cullen Award	1996–2001	Comeback player of the year. Known as "Comeback Player of the Year Award" (1996–1998).
Ironman Award	1988–2001	Durability / longevity.
IHL Man of the Year	1992–2001	Outstanding community service. Also known as "I. John Snider, II Trophy."

- Source.

== Franchise timelines ==
Founding year	Team name(s)	Years of operation	Number of seasons	Notes
1945	Detroit Auto Club	1945–1951	6	
1945	Detroit Bright's Goodyears	1945–1949	4	
1945	Windsor Gotfredsons; Windsor Staffords; Windsor Ryan Cretes	1945–1946; 1946–1948; 1948–1950	5	
1945	Windsor Spitfires; Windsor Hettche Spitfires; Detroit Hettche	1945–1947; 1947–1949; 1949–1952	7	
1946	Detroit Metal Mouldings; Detroit Jerry Lynch	1946–1948; 1948–1949	3	
1947	Toledo Mercurys	1947–1949; 1950–1962	14	Played in North and South divisions (1948–1949 season). Played as Toledo Buckeyes (EAHL) (1949–1950). Played as Toledo-Marion Mercurys (1955–1956). Played as Toledo-St. Louis Mercurys (1959–1960).
1948	Akron Americans	1948–1949	1	
1948	Louisville Blades	1948–1949	1	Transferred to USHL in 1949.
1948	Milwaukee Clarks	1948–1949	1	Transferred to EAHL in 1949.
1948	Muncie Flyers	1948–1949	1	
1949	Sarnia Sailors	1949–1951	2	Transferred to OHA Sr. A in 1951.
1949	Chatham Maroons	1949–1952; 1963–1964	4	Played in OHA Sr. A (1952–1963).
1950	Grand Rapids Rockets; Huntington Hornets; Louisville Rebels	1950–1956; 1956–1957; 1957–1960	10	
1951	Troy Bruins	1951–1959	8	
1952	Cincinnati Mohawks	1952–1958	6	Transferred from AHL in 1952.
1952	Fort Wayne Komets; Albany Choppers	1952–1990; 1990–1991	38	Ceased operations mid-season on February 15, 1991.
1952	Milwaukee Chiefs	1952–1954	2	
1953	Johnstown Jets	1953–1955	2	Transferred from EAHL in 1953; Transferred to EHL in 1955.
1953	Louisville Shooting Stars	1953–1954	1	
1953	Marion Barons	1953–1954	1	
1955	Indianapolis Chiefs	1955–1962	7	
1959	Milwaukee Falcons	1959–1960	2	Ceased operations November 26, 1960, during second season.
1959	Denver Mavericks; Minneapolis Millers	1959; 1959–1963	4	Denver relocated mid-season to Minneapolis on December 3, 1959.
1959	St. Paul Saints	1959–1963	4	
1959	Omaha Knights; Toledo Blades; Toledo Hornets; Lansing Lancers	1959–1963; 1963–1970; 1970–1974; 1974–1975	16	
1960	Muskegon Zephyrs; Muskegon Mohawks; Muskegon Lumberjacks; Cleveland Lumberjacks	1960–1965; 1965–1984; 1984–1992; 1992–2001	41	
1962	Port Huron Flags; Port Huron Wings; Port Huron Flags	1962–1971; 1971–1974; 1974–1981	19	
1963	Des Moines Oak Leafs; Des Moines Capitols	1963–1972; 1972–1975	12	
1963	Windsor Bulldogs	1963–1964	1	Transferred from OHA Sr. A in 1963.
1964	Dayton Gems	1964–1977; 1979–1980	14	Team on hiatus from 1977 to 1979.
1966	Columbus Checkers; Columbus Golden Seals; Columbus Owls; Dayton Owls; Grand Rapids Owls	1966–1970; 1971–1973; 1973–1977; 1977; 1977–1980	23	Franchise on hiatus from 1970 to 1971. Dayton relocated mid-season to Grand Rapids on December 15, 1977.
1969	Flint Generals; Saginaw Generals; Saginaw Hawks	1969–1985; 1985–1987; 1987–1989	20	
1972	Saginaw Gears	1972–1983	11	
1974	Kalamazoo Wings; Michigan K-Wings	1974–1995; 1995–2000	26	
1974	Toledo Goaldiggers; Kansas City Blades	1974–1986; 1990–2001	23	
1977	Milwaukee Admirals	1977–2001	24	Transferred from USHL in 1977. Transferred to AHL in 2001.
1982	Peoria Prancers; Peoria Rivermen; San Antonio Dragons	1982–1984; 1984–1996; 1996–1998	16	
1984	Salt Lake Golden Eagles; Detroit Vipers	1984–1994; 1994–2001	17	Transferred from CHL in 1984.
1984	Indianapolis Checkers; Colorado Rangers; Denver Rangers; Phoenix Roadrunners	1984–1987; 1987–1988; 1988–1989; 1989–1997	13	Transferred from CHL in 1984.
1985	Flint Spirits; Fort Wayne Komets	1985–1990; 1990–1999	13	Transferred to UHL in 1999.
1988	Indianapolis Ice	1988–1999	11	Transferred to CHL in 1999.
1990	San Diego Gulls; Los Angeles Ice Dogs; Long Beach Ice Dogs	1990–1995; 1995–1996; 1996–2000	10	Transferred to WCHL in 2000.
1992	Atlanta Knights; Quebec Rafales	1992–1996; 1996–1998	6	
1992	Cincinnati Cyclones	1992–2001	9	Replaced ECHL team of the same name in 1992. Replaced by an ECHL team of the same name after the IHL folded in 2001.
1993	Las Vegas Thunder	1993–1999	6	
1994	Chicago Wolves	1994–2001	7	Transferred to AHL in 2001.
1994	Houston Aeros	1994–2001	7	Transferred to AHL in 2001.
1994	Minnesota Moose; Manitoba Moose	1994–1996; 1996–2001	7	Transferred to AHL in 2001.
1994	Denver Grizzlies; Utah Grizzlies	1994–1995; 1995–2001	7	Transferred to AHL in 2001.
1995	Orlando Solar Bears	1995–2001	6	
1995	San Francisco Spiders	1995–1996	1	
1996	Grand Rapids Griffins	1996–2001	5	Transferred to AHL in 2001.

== See also ==
- List of developmental and minor sports leagues
- List of ice hockey leagues
- Minor league
