= Ed Reigle =

Canadian ice hockey player and coach

- Born: June 19, 1924 Winnipeg, Manitoba, Canada
- Died: November 20, 2003 (aged 79)
- Height: 5 ft 9 in (175 cm)
- Weight: 180 lb (82 kg; 12 st 12 lb)
- Position: Defence
- Shot: Left
- Played for: Boston Bruins
- Playing career: 1944–1957

Edmund Reigle (June 19, 1924 – November 20, 2003) was a Canadian professional ice hockey player and coach. Reigle playing career, which lasted from 1944 to 1957, was mainly spent in the minor leagues. He also played 17 games in the National Hockey League for the Boston Bruins during the 1950–51 season. After retiring as a player, Reigle became a coach, coaching the Sweden national team between 1957 (winning the Gold medal with Sweden at Ice Hockey World Championships that year) and 1960, including the 1960 Olympics and later coached West Germany at the 1968 Winter Olympics.

== Career statistics ==
=== Regular season and playoffs ===
			Regular season					Playoffs
Season	Team	League	GP	G	A	Pts	PIM	GP	G	A	Pts	PIM
1940–41	East Kildonan North Stars	MJHL	1	0	0	0	2	—	—	—	—	—
1941–42	East Kildonan North Stars	MJHL	18	4	7	11	29	2	1	0	1	4
1942–43	Oshawa Generals	OHA	22	4	6	10	28	20	5	5	10	31
1942–43	Oshawa Generals	M-Cup	—	—	—	—	—	10	1	2	3	10
1944–45	Indianapolis Capitals	AHL	28	1	5	6	24	5	1	3	4	2
1944–45	Toronto Army Shamrocks	TIHL	1	0	0	0	2	—	—	—	—	—
1945–46	Omaha Knights	USHL	46	12	11	23	100	7	0	4	4	7
1945–46	Indianapolis Capitals	AHL	7	0	3	3	7	—	—	—	—	—
1946–47	Omaha Knights	USHL	19	0	0	0	22	11	1	1	2	2
1946–47	Detroit Metal Mouldings	IHL	4	1	0	1	2	—	—	—	—	—
1947–48	Omaha Knights	USHL	53	16	17	33	58	3	0	0	0	20
1948–49	Omaha Knights	USHL	62	9	25	34	109	4	0	0	0	2
1949–50	Cleveland Barons	AHL	62	5	20	25	62	9	0	4	4	16
1950–51	Hershey Bears	AHL	50	6	31	37	76	3	0	0	0	6
1950–51	Boston Bruins	NHL	17	0	2	2	25	—	—	—	—	—
1951–52	Cleveland Barons	AHL	64	10	35	45	119	5	0	3	3	6
1952–53	Cleveland Barons	AHL	49	3	35	38	47	—	—	—	—	—
1953–54	Cleveland Barons	AHL	68	10	26	36	95	7	1	4	5	8
1954–55	Cleveland Barons	AHL	62	7	30	37	90	4	0	1	1	2
1955–56	North Bay Trappers	NOHA	51	7	18	25	66	10	0	6	6	8
1956–57	North Bay Trappers	NOHA	54	8	22	30	62	13	3	5	8	16
AHL totals			390	42	185	227	520	33	2	15	17	40
NHL totals			17	0	2	2	25	—	—	—	—	—
