= Lloyd Pollock =

Canadian ice hockey administrator and businessman (1909–1993)

- Born: July 26, 1909; Pine River, Ontario, Canada
- Died: September 9, 1993 (aged 84); Windsor, Ontario, Canada
- Occupation: Canadian Pacific Railway clerk
- Known for: CAHA & OHA president IHL cofounder Windsor Spitfires founder
- Family: Kevin Pollock (grandnephew)
- Awards: Windsor / Essex County Sports Hall of Fame

Lloyd Thompson Pollock (July 26, 1909 – September 9, 1993) was a Canadian ice hockey administrator and businessman. After running the Windsor City Hockey League, he assisted in the foundation of the Windsor Softball League, and later started a junior ice hockey league in Windsor, Ontario. He was a cofounder of the International Hockey League in 1945, and founder of the original Windsor Spitfires junior team in 1946. He served as president of the Ontario Hockey Association (OHA) from 1961 to 1963, welcomed the Montreal Junior Canadiens into the OHA when it was divided by the Metro Junior A League, and supported measures to preserve the Northern Ontario Hockey Association.

He served four years as a vice-president of the Canadian Amateur Hockey Association (CAHA) from 1964 to 1968, and was its president in 1968. He oversaw international tours between the Canadian and Soviet national teams, and arbitrated disputes in Memorial Cup competition as vice-president. He served as the CAHA president at a time when the Western Canada Hockey League left the CAHA jurisdiction and joined the rival Canadian Hockey Association over disputes on the age limit of junior players. He resigned in 1968 for business reasons, and regretted becoming CAHA president at a critical time. He was inducted into Windsor / Essex County Sports Hall of Fame in 1983.

== Early life ==
Lloyd Thompson Pollock was born on July 26, 1909, in Pine River, Ontario. He moved to Windsor in 1933, and began working for the Canadian Pacific Railway as a cashier. In the early 1930s he became involved with the Windsor City Hockey League and became its secretary-treasurer, and was also involved in the foundation of the Windsor Softball League.

== Windsor hockey ==
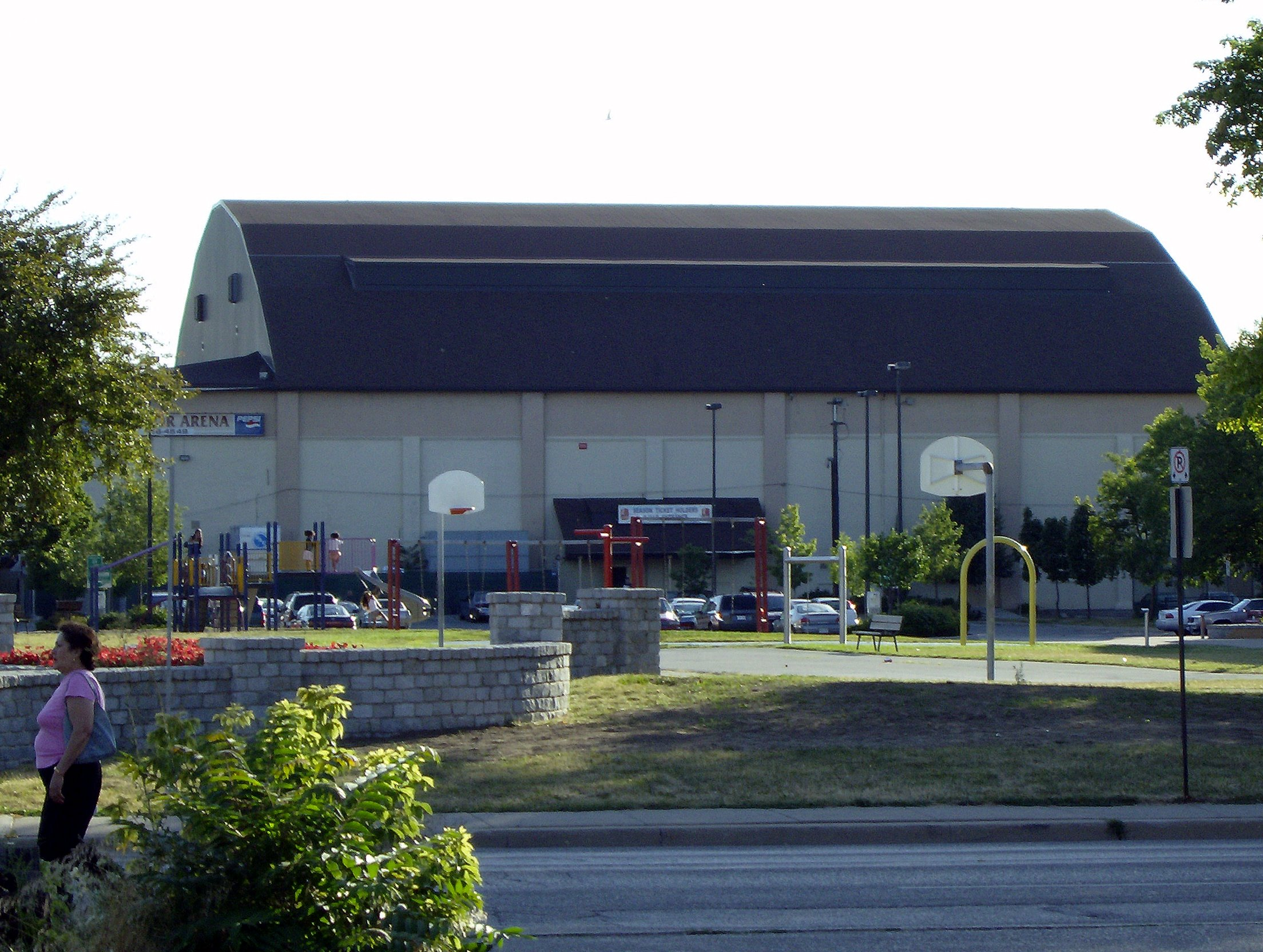
Windsor Arena

Pollock was involved in establishing a junior ice hockey league for the 1942–43 season in Windsor. The league competed at the Junior B-level in the Ontario Hockey Association (OHA), with the ultimate goal of obtaining a Junior A-level team in Windsor. On December 5, 1945, at the Norton Palmer Hotel in Windsor, Pollock was one of the eight attendees of the inaugural meeting which founded the International Hockey League (IHL), which included Jack Adams and Fred Huber both of the Detroit Red Wings. The league began operations in the 1945–46 season with teams in Windsor and Detroit, and operated as semi-professional league. Pollock served as general manager of the Windsor Hettche Spitfires in the IHL, which acted as a farm team for the Detroit Red Wings.

Pollock's goal of a Junior A-level team in Windsor was realized in 1946, when he established the original Windsor Spitfires for the 1946–47 OHA season. He and business partner Jack Dent obtained franchise rights from the OHA for C$500, and purchased uniform for another $100. The team lost its first game 15-0 to the Toronto St. Michael's Majors, but attracted a crowd of 4,062 spectators at the Windsor Arena. Pollock served as the team's general manager. The original Spitfires operated in the OHA from 1946 to 1953, were coached by Jimmy Skinner, and reached the J. Ross Robertson Cup final during the 1947–48 OHA season. Pollock convinced the Detroit Red Wings to relocate prospect players from the Galt Red Wings to Windsor in 1947. The team produced several future star players for Detroit, including Glenn Hall, Marcel Pronovost, Earl Reibel, Johnny Wilson, and Glen Skov. The team was sold in 1953, and relocated to become the Hamilton Tiger Cubs.

== Ontario hockey ==
The Allan Cup trophy

Pollock moved up to provincial level hockey in 1952 and served on the OHA executive committee until 1963. During this time, he acted as a convenor for OHA and Allan Cup playoffs. During the 1956 Allan Cup tournament, Pollock commented on the rising salaries in hockey. He felt that players were overpaid and stated that team budgets should correspond to attendance figures and ticket sales. As an OHA convenor in 1960, he ruled that the Kitchener-Waterloo Dutchmen missed the final playoff berth in the OHA standings based on goals, despite protests by the team which represented Canada in ice hockey at the 1960 Winter Olympics.

Pollock was elected president of the OHA in 1961 and served as its leader until 1963. In 1961, Pollock was faced with the junior teams based in Toronto splitting off into the Metro Junior A League, which left the OHA's junior division with only five teams. In August that year, Pollock applied to the Canadian Amateur Hockey Association (CAHA) to permit the Montreal Junior Canadiens from the Quebec Amateur Hockey Association to play in the OHA as its sixth team. The request was denied by CAHA president Jack Roxburgh, who stated that CAHA rules do not allow en masse transfers between provincial associations. Pollock briefly considered operating the OHA outside of the CAHA's jurisdiction but decided against doing so. The proposal for the Canadiens to play in the OHA's junior division was later approved in September 1961, when the CAHA branch presidents voted in its favour. An agreement was also reached that saw the OHA junior champion play the Metro Junior A League champion during the Memorial Cup playoffs.

In November 1962, the Metro Junior A League began its second season separated from the OHA. Pollock stated a continued desire to have only one Junior-A league in Ontario and to reunite the teams under the OHA's jurisdiction. He also spoke out against players under the age of 16 being asked to move away from home to play hockey. At the same time, the OHA introduced rules to make hockey helmets mandatory as of January 1, 1963, for all players except goaltenders in midget age groups and younger. In May 1963, the Northern Ontario Hockey Association applied to the CAHA to become an equal branch to the OHA. When the request was denied by the CAHA, Pollock stated that measures needed to be put in place to prevent the migration of players southwards to the more populated OHA, and preserve the leagues in Northern Ontario.

== Canadian hockey ==
=== CAHA 2nd vice-president ===
The Memorial Cup trophy

Pollock was elected the second vice-president of the CAHA, on May 23, 1964, serving under Lionel Fleury as president. Pollock sat on the CAHA committee to reevaluate the existing development agreement with the National Hockey League (NHL), in an attempt to have amateur hockey be more independent from professional influence. He also oversaw the Soviet Union national ice hockey team's tour through Toronto, in December 1964. In March 1965, the CAHA submitted a bid to the International Ice Hockey Federation (IIHF) for hosting duties of the 1967 World Ice Hockey Championships, but the IIHF ultimately chose Austria instead. Pollock reacted by saying, "possibly we should consider now whether or not its worth" going to future championships, in response to the IIHF disregarding the Canadian Centennial request.

Pollock was reelected as the second vice-president of the CAHA on May 28, 1965. He oversaw the Soviet Union national ice hockey team's 1965 tour, which included games against the Canada men's national ice hockey team, Montreal Junior Canadiens, and Toronto Marlboros. In January 1966, Pollock chaperoned the Sherbrooke Beavers exhibition tour of Europe, and the 1965 Allan Cup champions. When reports surfaced from the media in Moscow that Canadian diplomat Robert Ford had admonished the team for rough play, Pollock denied the reports as untrue. Later in January, the CAHA terminated the working agreement with Amateur Hockey Association of the United States, in favour of negotiating new terms. Pollock said that the decision was due to professional leagues in both countries violating the principles of the agreement by assigning players to IHL and the Eastern Hockey League. He also said American professional teams were supplementing rosters by taking advantage of a 10-day period to negotiate a player transfer, and using the player in games without completing the transfer.

Pollock was placed in charge of the 1966 Memorial Cup which included multiple protests and disagreements between the Edmonton Oil Kings and the Oshawa Generals. A Canadian Press release published on May 13, 1966, credited him for keeping the peace and being unflappable. He was quoted as saying "a big stick can be just as effective as a soft-sell", after he rejected protests from both Wren Blair of Oshawa, and Bill Hunter of Edmonton, for both managers not knowing the regulations. During the series, Hunter made newspaper headlines when he stated his vision for a nation-wide junior ice hockey league competing for the Memorial Cup. Pollock responded by saying that the idea would be nothing more than a pipe dream, and would not be feasible while the CAHA was renegotiating an agreement with professional leagues. After the conclusion of the series, Pollock announced a $40,000 profit in ticket sales due to playing all of the games at Maple Leaf Gardens, and that the CAHA received 25% of revenue from television broadcasts of the games which would benefit junior hockey.

=== CAHA 1st vice-president ===
Pollock was elected the first vice-president of the CAHA, on May 28, 1966, serving for two years under Fred Page as president. On August 19, 1966, the CAHA announced a new professional-amateur agreement with the NHL, that Pollock had assisted in negotiating. Under the tentative agreement effective July 1, 1967, direct sponsorship of junior teams by the NHL was to be phased out, the CAHA gained control over the development fees paid by the NHL, and junior players became eligible for the NHL entry draft at age 20. The CAHA faced a revolt from teams in Western Canada that disagreed with the age limit changing from 21 to 20. The breakaway teams formed the Canadian Major Junior Hockey League (CMJHL), and Pollock and fellow CAHA executives were unsuccessful in negotiations during the league's first season to resolve the age limit dispute. The CMJHL began legal action against the CAHA executive in March 1967, since the CAHA had suspended CMJHL teams and ruled the teams ineligible for the Memorial Cup playoffs. In May 1967, the CMJHL renamed itself to the Western Canada Junior Hockey League (WCJHL).

In his second year as the first vice-president, the CAHA was awarded hosting duties for the A-pool of the 1970 World Ice Hockey Championships. Pollock was part of the executive committee which decided on which Canadian cities would host games in the tournament. The CAHA and the WCJHL reached an agreement for its western teams to compete for the 1968 Memorial Cup, and Pollock was put in charge of the schedule between the Niagara Falls Flyers and the Estevan Bruins. He chose to schedule a game at the Montreal Forum to increase profits for CAHA, due to the smaller size of the Flyers' Niagara Falls Memorial Arena, and Maple Leaf Gardens not being available. Pollock and Fred Page chose to hold a special meeting with the CAHA executive and the CAHA branch presidents in advance of the upcoming general meeting. Pollock summarized the meeting as reiterating the CAHA stance on the change of age limit for junior players due to the new agreement with the NHL, despite pending motions from delegates in the OHA and the Alberta Amateur Hockey Association to raise the age limit.

=== CAHA president ===
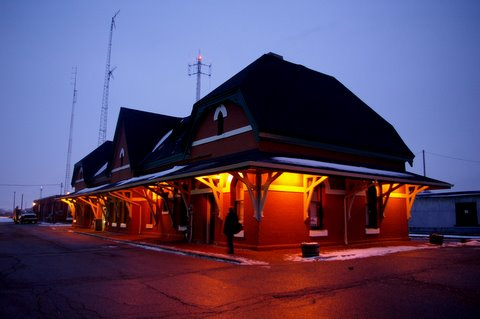
Train station in Chatham, where Pollock worked while president of the CAHA

Pollock was elected president of the CAHA at its general meeting in May 1968. Later that month, Bill Hunter of the WCJHL announced the league would use an age limit of 21 in defiance of the CAHA and NHL agreement. The WCJHL stopped short of declaring independence from the CAHA, and claimed that the lower age limit would decrease its talent pool and negatively affect ticket sales. In response, Pollock was quoted as saying that if the higher age was used, the league and its players would be suspended by the CAHA and not be allowed to transfer to other CAHA teams in good standing. A week later in a telephone interview, Pollock said that he wanted to avoid repeating the mistake of suspending those involved with the WCJHL age limit issue. He felt the previous suspensions were premature, as they did not stop the teams from playing. He also said that his stand on suspensions was misunderstood a week before. He said that players would not likely be released just to play outside the CAHA, and would be suspended for doing so; and that teams which played outside of the CAHA would lose their annual subsidy, and be ineligible for the Memorial Cup playoffs.

On June 10, 1968, the WCJHL announced a name change to the Western Canada Hockey League (WCHL), and that it was leaving the CAHA to affiliate with the rival Canadian Hockey Association (CHA). The WCHL and the CHA were led by Ron Butlin as president of both association and league. Prior to the separation, Pollock had called for meetings to discuss a new junior playoff format, but with fewer teams under its jurisdiction the CAHA decided to allow those remaining to continue playing for the Memorial Cup. Later in June, the NHL confirmed that it would not cooperate with the CHA or WCHL, and Pollock stated that he was aware of the Niagara Falls Flyers being sympathetic to the CHA, and that Butlin was canvassing for more support in British Columbia and Northern Ontario.

In July 1968, Pollock helped to set up meetings across Western Canada to outline the CAHA's development plan for teams which had remained within the CAHA. Later that month, he approved a series of exhibition games for teams in the OHA to play the Regina Pats and Weyburn Red Wings, after Regina and Weyburn had asked for assistance in forming the Saskatchewan Junior Hockey League. Pollock also laid out plans to make player transfers easier between provinces to support the Saskatchewan teams. The CAHA also agreed to help cover the OHA's costs to go west, and also play the Canada men's national ice hockey team in Winnipeg.

In September 1968, the Western Ontario Junior A Hockey League (WOJHL) left the OHA and joined the rival CHA. Pollock stated that players leaving for the WOJHL would face difficulty in being reinstated with the OHA, but no suspensions were issued. He also felt that Butlin was making a smokescreen for the failing CHA, when claims were made that NHL teams had contacted the CHA for placement of prospect players.

Resignation as president...

"Through the years I have enjoyed many fine, and I hope lasting, friendships through my association with amateur hockey, and will continue to remain most interested in the greatest team sport in the world."

— Lloyd Pollock, 1968

In October 1968, Pollock was feeling overwhelmed by the expectations as the CAHA president. He announced his resignation after taking a week's vacation to contemplate his future. Fred Page announced that he had received the resignation of Pollock on October 22, 1968, and that no changes would be made to the CAHA committee until the semiannual meeting in January 1969. Page also said the association will "greatly miss the many years of hockey experience which Pollock brought to the CAHA as an officer". Pollock resigned for "business reasons" after his professional career shifted from Windsor to Chatham, Ontario.

Journalist Reyn Davis of the Winnipeg Free Press reported that the resignation was not a surprise, and described Pollock as a silver-haired gentleman with a kind disposition, who had been run ragged by the time demands of being CAHA president. Pollock was transferred to Chatham in July 1968, commuted round-trip from Windsor each weekday, was frequently contacted at work for hockey matters, spent his evenings responding to CAHA business, and was away on weekends for hockey events. He considered selling his house, but chose to remain in Windsor since he was close to retiring and wanted to keep his wife happy. Another factor was the Government of Canada getting involved in ice hockey and amateur sport, which resulted in the proposal to start another governing body in Hockey Canada, in addition to the competing CAHA and CHA. Pollock regretted becoming CAHA president at a critical time in his life, which coincided with the division of ice hockey governing bodies in Canada.

== Later life and honours ==
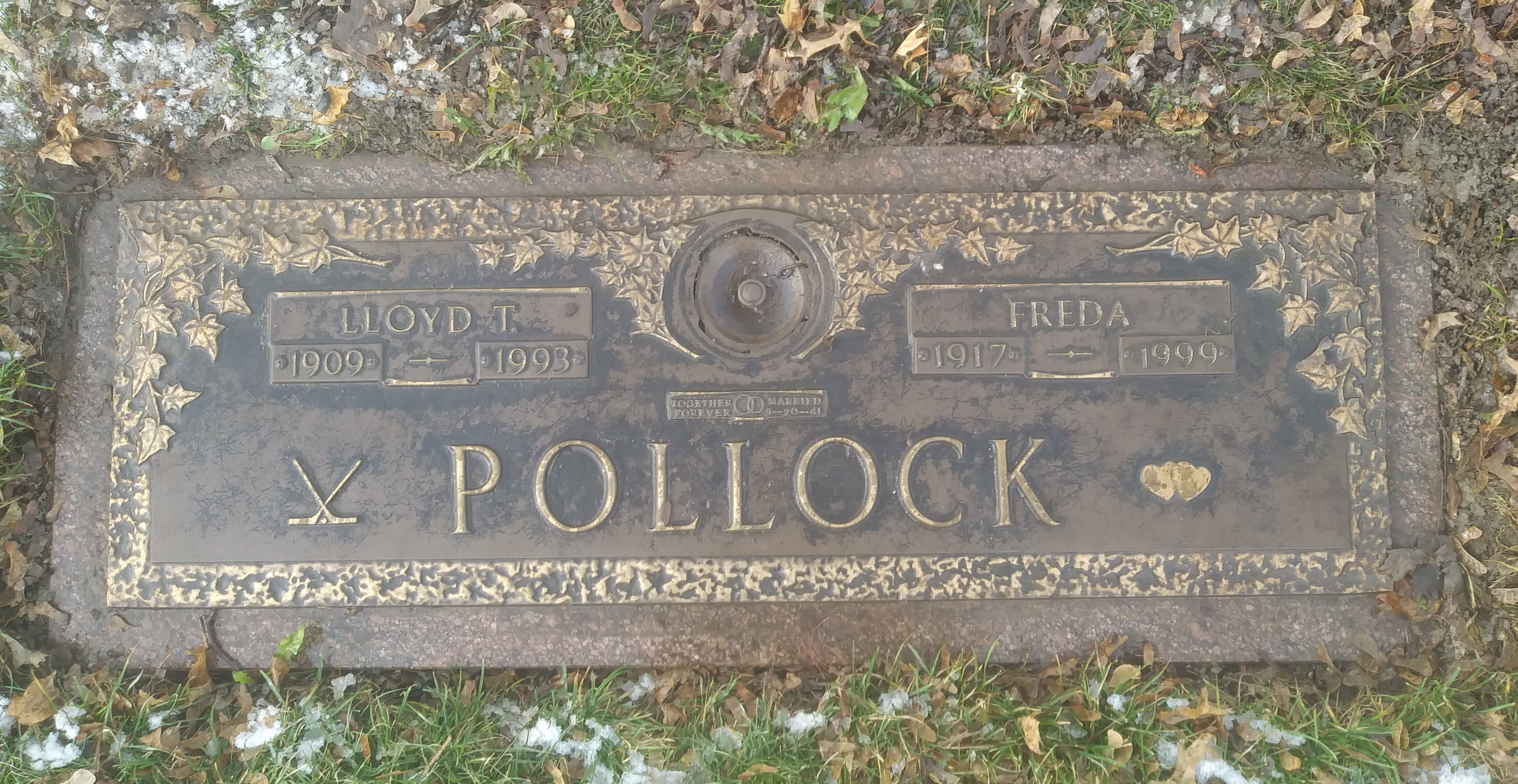
Pollock's grave marker at Victoria Memorial Gardens.

Pollock was succeeded as the CAHA president by Earl Dawson in January 1969, who had been acting as president since the resignation. Pollock was a recipient of the OHA Gold Stick award in 1970, in recognition of his career in ice hockey. He was inducted into the Windsor / Essex County Sports Hall of Fame in 1983, and was called "one of the greatest things that ever happened to Windsor athletics".

Pollock died September 9, 1993, at the Windsor Western Hospital Centre. He was survived by wife Freda, a son and a daughter. He was interred at Victoria Memorial Gardens in Tecumseh, Ontario.

== Family ==
Pollock's nephew Clarke Pollock was an on-ice official in the OHA for 20 seasons. Clarke's son Kevin Pollock won an OHA championship playing as a member of the Hanover Barons in 1991. Kevin also officiated in the OHA before becoming an NHL referee. Clarke and Kevin are the namesakes of the Pollock Division in the Provincial Junior Hockey League.
