= Doug McKay =

Canadian ice hockey player (1929–2020)

- Born: May 28, 1929 Hamilton, Ontario, Canada
- Died: May 11, 2020 (aged 90) Burlington, Ontario, Canada
- Height: 5 ft 9 in (175 cm)
- Weight: 160 lb (73 kg; 11 st 6 lb)
- Position: Left wing
- Shot: Left
- Played for: Detroit Red Wings
- Playing career: 1947–1957

Alvin Douglas McKay (May 28, 1929 – May 11, 2020) was a Canadian professional ice hockey player. He played one playoff game in the National Hockey League with the Detroit Red Wings during the 1950 Stanley Cup Final, helping Detroit win the Stanley Cup, though his name did not appear on the Cup. The rest of his career, which lasted from 1947 to 1957, was spent in various minor leagues. He also won the Calder Cup with the Indianapolis Capitals of the American Hockey League in 1950, along with teammate Gordon Haidy. McKay and Chris Hayes are the only NHL players to play their only game in the Stanley Cup Final. McKay died in May 2020 at the age of 90.

== Career statistics ==
=== Regular season and playoffs ===
			Regular season					Playoffs
Season	Team	League	GP	G	A	Pts	PIM	GP	G	A	Pts	PIM
1947–48	Windsor Spitfires	OHA	33	18	32	50	25	12	1	4	5	21
1947–48	Detroit Bright's Goodyears	IHL	24	8	16	24	68	—	—	—	—	—
1948–49	Detroit Auto Club	IHL	6	2	4	6	26	—	—	—	—	—
1948–49	Windsor Spitfires	OHA	42	19	29	48	98	4	0	1	1	2
1949–50	Indianapolis Capitals	AHL	65	16	31	47	37	8	2	6	8	12
1949–50	Detroit Red Wings	NHL	—	—	—	—	—	1	0	0	0	0
1950–51	Omaha Knights	USHL	10	4	5	9	26	10	2	1	3	24
1950–51	Indianapolis Capitals	AHL	35	7	8	15	31	—	—	—	—	—
1951–52	Indianapolis Capitals	AHL	50	2	8	10	35	—	—	—	—	—
1952–53	Vernon Canadians	OSHL	16	2	2	4	16	—	—	—	—	—
1952–53	Brantford Redmen	OHA Sr	11	6	10	16	26	4	1	2	3	4
1953–54	Vernon Canadians	OSHL	43	5	25	30	51	—	—	—	—	—
1953–54	Hamilton Tigers	OHA Sr	2	0	0	0	4	—	—	—	—	—
1955–56	Stratford Indians	OHA Sr	27	8	14	22	0	7	2	3	5	22
1956–57	Stratford Indians	OHA Sr	25	3	12	15	0	3	0	1	1	2
AHL totals			150	25	47	72	103	8	2	6	8	21
NHL totals			—	—	—	—	—	1	0	0	0	0

== See also ==
- List of players who played only one game in the NHL
