= Max McNab =

Canadian ice hockey player (1924–2007)

- Born: June 21, 1924 Watson, Saskatchewan, Canada
- Died: September 2, 2007 (aged 83) Las Vegas, Nevada, U.S.
- Height: 6 ft 2 in (188 cm)
- Weight: 170 lb (77 kg; 12 st 2 lb)
- Position: Centre
- Shot: Left
- Played for: Detroit Red Wings
- Playing career: 1945–1959

Maxwell Douglas McNab (June 21, 1924 – September 2, 2007) was a Canadian professional ice hockey player, coach, and National Hockey League (NHL) general manager. He played in the NHL with the Detroit Red Wings between 1947 and 1951, winning the Stanley Cup with them in 1950. The rest of his playing career, which lasted from 1945 to 1959, was spent in various minor leagues.

McNab's coaching and management career included stints as the general manager of the Washington Capitals and New Jersey Devils between 1976 and 1987. He also spent time as president of the Central Hockey League; the Max McNab Trophy, awarded to the MVP of the league playoffs, would later be named in his honour. In 1998, McNab was awarded the Lester Patrick Trophy in recognition of his contributions to hockey in the United States.

== Playing career ==
After playing junior hockey in Saskatoon, Saskatchewan, McNab played on the Omaha Knights of the USHL in the 1946–48 season before being called up to the Detroit Red Wings of the National Hockey League in 1947. He would play on and off with the Red Wings until 1951, playing on the team that won the Stanley Cup in 1950, centering a line with Gordie Howe and Ted Lindsay. He played for the Indianapolis Capitols of the American Hockey League in 1950–51. Before the 1951–52 season, he was traded by the Red Wings to the Chicago Black Hawks, but never played for the team. Back surgery kept him out of action in 1951–52 and McNab then joined the New Westminster Royals of the Western Hockey League, where he played for seven seasons, retiring in 1959. He was voted league MVP in 1955, scoring 32 goals and 81 points.

== Coaching and managing ==
In 1961, McNab became general manager and coach of the San Francisco Seals of the WHL. He was then coach of the WHL's Vancouver Canucks and in 1966 was hired as coach and general manager of the San Diego Gulls. He rose in the front office to vice-president by 1971. In 1974 he was named president of the Central Hockey League. Although he would only remain with the CHL for a year, the Max McNab Trophy, awarded to the most valuable player in the league's playoffs, would be named in his honor.

Near the end of 1975, he joined the NHL as general manager of the Washington Capitals, succeeding Milt Schmidt. McNab remained in that job until 1982. Under his watch, the team drafted players such as Rick Green, Ryan Walter, Mike Gartner, and Bobby Carpenter.

Midway through the 1983–84 season, McNab joined the New Jersey Devils as vice-president and general manager. He would remain their general manager until 1987, and then retired from the team and hockey in the 1990s. During his tenure as Devils' GM, players such as Chris Terreri, Kirk Muller, Sean Burke, and Eric Weinrich would be drafted.

In 1998, McNab was recognized for his contribution to ice hockey in the United States by the NHL and USA Hockey as co-recipient of the Lester Patrick Trophy.

== Family ==
Two of McNab's three sons have hockey-related careers. Peter McNab played in the NHL for 14 seasons, scoring 363 goals and 813 points, before becoming a television color analyst. David McNab spent 43 seasons working as a scout and executive for four NHL franchises before retiring in May 2021 as the senior vice president of hockey operations for the Anaheim Ducks after 28 years with the club from its inaugural season.

McNabs Island in Nova Scotia is named in honour of the McNab family, who first settled the island in the 1780s.

== Career statistics ==
=== Regular season and playoffs ===
			Regular season					Playoffs
Season	Team	League	GP	G	A	Pts	PIM	GP	G	A	Pts	PIM
1942–43	Saskatoon Quakers	N-SJHL	4	7	8	15	6	2	1	2	3	0
1945–46	Regina Capitals	WCSHL	5	8	1	9	0	—	—	—	—	—
1946–47	Omaha Knights	USHL	37	20	19	39	15	11	6	6	12	0
1946–47	Detroit Metal Mouldings	IHL	3	4	2	6	6	—	—	—	—	—
1946–47	Indianapolis Capitals	AHL	6	0	0	0	2	—	—	—	—	—
1947–48	Omaha Knights	USHL	44	44	32	76	10	3	3	2	5	0
1947–48	Detroit Red Wings	NHL	12	2	2	4	2	3	0	0	0	2
1948–49	Detroit Red Wings	NHL	51	10	13	23	14	10	1	0	1	2
1949–50	Detroit Red Wings	NHL	65	4	4	8	8	10	0	0	0	0
1950–51	Indianapolis Capitals	AHL	70	36	48	84	36	3	1	2	3	2
1950–51	Detroit Red Wings	NHL	—	—	—	—	—	2	0	0	0	0
1951–52	New Westminster Royals	PCHL	—	—	—	—	—	—	—	—	—	—
1952–53	New Westminster Royals	WHL	68	28	32	60	4	7	2	0	2	0
1953–54	New Westminster Royals	WHL	67	22	39	61	8	6	2	1	3	2
1954–55	New Westminster Royals	WHL	70	32	49	81	4	—	—	—	—	—
1955–56	New Westminster Royals	WHL	70	29	32	61	19	4	1	1	2	0
1956–57	New Westminster Royals	WHL	56	19	28	47	2	13	4	8	12	4
1957–58	New Westminster Royals	WHL	67	24	50	74	14	4	0	1	1	0
1958–59	New Westminster Royals	WHL	65	26	32	58	4	—	—	—	—	—
WHL totals			463	180	262	442	55	34	9	11	20	6
NHL totals			128	16	19	35	24	25	1	0	1	4

Sporting positions
Preceded by Milt Schmidt	General Manager of the Washington Capitals; 1976–81	Succeeded by Roger Crozier
Preceded by Bill MacMillan	General Manager of the New Jersey Devils; 1983–87	Succeeded by Lou Lamoriello
