= Larry Wilson (ice hockey) =

Canadian ice hockey player and coach

- Born: October 23, 1930 Kincardine, Ontario, Canada
- Died: August 16, 1979 (aged 48) Queensbury, New York, U.S.
- Height: 5 ft 11 in (180 cm)
- Weight: 175 lb (79 kg; 12 st 7 lb)
- Position: Centre
- Shot: Left
- Played for: Detroit Red Wings; Chicago Black Hawks
- Playing career: 1949–1956

Lawrence Wilson (October 23, 1930 – August 16, 1979) was a Canadian professional ice hockey centre and coach. He played 152 games in the National Hockey League (NHL) with the Detroit Red Wings and Chicago Black Hawks between 1950 and 1955, winning the Stanley Cup in his first season with Detroit in 1950. Wilson later became the interim head coach of the Red Wings during the 1976–77 season. He also coached in the minor leagues between 1968 and 1979. and 1978–79 seasons. Wilson was born in Kincardine, Ontario, but grew up in Shawinigan Falls, Quebec.

== Personal life ==
Wilson was the father of former NHL player and head coach Ron Wilson. His older brother, Johnny Wilson, also played and coached in the NHL.

During the summer of 1979, he died of an apparent heart attack while jogging.

== Career statistics ==
=== Regular season and playoffs ===
			Regular season					Playoffs
Season	Team	League	GP	G	A	Pts	PIM	GP	G	A	Pts	PIM
1947–48	Windsor Spitfires	OHA	12	4	13	17	2	12	3	3	6	9
1947–48	Windsor Hettche Spitfires	IHL	25	13	29	42	6	—	—	—	—	—
1948–49	Windsor Spitfires	OHA	45	23	37	60	22	4	1	1	2	2
1948–49	Windsor Hettche Spitfires	IHL	9	10	7	17	6	13	4	17	21	20
1949–50	Detroit Red Wings	NHL	1	0	0	0	2	4	0	0	0	0
1949–50	Omaha Knights	USHL	70	22	57	79	51	7	2	6	8	10
1950–51	Indianapolis Capitals	AHL	53	12	23	35	14	3	0	1	1	0
1951–52	Detroit Red Wings	NHL	5	0	0	0	4	—	—	—	—	—
1951–52	Indianapolis Capitals	AHL	62	19	40	59	30	—	—	—	—	—
1952–53	Detroit Red Wings	NHL	15	0	4	4	6	—	—	—	—	—
1952–53	Edmonton Flyers	WHL	49	17	29	46	24	14	6	7	13	4
1953–54	Chicago Black Hawks	NHL	66	9	33	42	22	—	—	—	—	—
1954–55	Chicago Black Hawks	NHL	63	12	11	23	39	—	—	—	—	—
1955–56	Chicago Black Hawks	NHL	2	0	0	0	2	—	—	—	—	—
1955–56	Buffalo Bisons	AHL	62	39	39	78	74	5	0	2	2	4
1956–57	Buffalo Bisons	AHL	64	22	45	67	71	—	—	—	—	—
1957–58	Buffalo Bisons	AHL	70	26	53	79	48	—	—	—	—	—
1958–59	Buffalo Bisons	AHL	66	24	39	63	26	11	0	5	5	5
1959–60	Buffalo Bisons	AHL	64	33	45	78	18	—	—	—	—	—
1960–61	Buffalo Bisons	AHL	72	30	54	84	62	4	0	2	2	0
1961–62	Buffalo Bisons	AHL	68	9	25	34	28	10	3	0	3	4
1962–63	Buffalo Bisons	AHL	72	16	29	45	30	13	1	3	4	0
1963–64	Buffalo Bisons	AHL	71	17	26	43	38	—	—	—	—	—
1964–65	Buffalo Bisons	AHL	31	0	7	7	12	—	—	—	—	—
1965–66	Buffalo Bisons	AHL	38	13	12	25	8	—	—	—	—	—
1966–67	Buffalo Bisons	AHL	65	28	37	65	60	—	—	—	—	—
1967–68	Buffalo Bisons	AHL	41	10	18	28	24	—	—	—	—	—
1968–69	Dayton Gems	IHL	50	19	42	61	36	—	—	—	—	—
1969–70	Dayton Gems	IHL	68	20	43	63	54	13	2	4	6	0
AHL totals			899	298	492	790	543	46	4	13	17	15
NHL totals			152	21	48	69	75	4	0	0	0	0

== NHL coaching record ==
Team	Year	Regular season						Postseason
Team	Year	G	W	L	T	Pts	Finish	Result
Detroit Red Wings	1976–77	36	3	29	4	10	5th in Norris	Did not qualify

Preceded by Alex Delvecchio	Head coach of the Detroit Red Wings; 1977	Succeeded by Bobby Kromm
