= Jim Hay =

Canadian ice hockey player

- Born: May 15, 1931 Saskatoon, Saskatchewan, Canada
- Died: May 17, 2018 (aged 87) Portland, Oregon, U.S.
- Height: 5 ft 11 in (180 cm)
- Weight: 185 lb (84 kg; 13 st 3 lb)
- Position: Defence
- Shot: Right
- Played for: Detroit Red Wings
- Playing career: 1947–1973

James Alexander "Red-Eye" Hay (May 15, 1931 – May 17, 2018) was a Canadian professional ice hockey defenceman who played 74 games in the National Hockey League with the Detroit Red Wings between 1952 and 1955. The rest of his career, which lasted from 1947 to 1973, was spent in the minor leagues, mainly the Western Hockey League. He was included on 1954, 1955 Stanley Cup pictures with the Red Wings. His name was engraved on the Stanley Cup in 1955.

== Career statistics ==
=== Regular season and playoffs ===
| | | | Regular season | | | | | Playoffs |
| Season | Team | League | GP | G | A | Pts | PIM | GP | G | A | Pts | PIM |
|---|---|---|---|---|---|---|---|---|---|---|---|---|
| 1946–47 | Saskatoon Legion | SJHL | 3 | 2 | 0 | 2 | 0 | — | — | — | — | — |
| 1947–48 | Windsor Spitfires | OHA | 29 | 10 | 15 | 25 | 40 | 10 | 2 | 0 | 2 | 10 |
| 1947–48 | Detroit Auto Club | IHL | 25 | 10 | 15 | 25 | 37 | — | — | — | — | — |
| 1948–49 | Windsor Spitfires | OHA | 48 | 9 | 8 | 7 | 74 | 4 | 0 | 0 | 0 | 2 |
| 1948–49 | Saskatoon Quakers | SJHL | 2 | 1 | 0 | 1 | 0 | 2 | 2 | 1 | 3 | 4 |
| 1948–49 | Detroit Auto Club | IHL | 10 | 5 | 3 | 8 | 5 | 6 | 2 | 2 | 4 | 4 |
| 1949–50 | Windsor Spitfires | OHA | 48 | 5 | 15 | 20 | 98 | 11 | 2 | 1 | 3 | 6 |
| 1950–51 | Omaha Knights | USHL | 64 | 24 | 22 | 46 | 150 | 4 | 1 | 2 | 3 | 4 |
| 1951–52 | Indianapolis Capitals | AHL | 68 | 7 | 15 | 22 | 129 | — | — | — | — | — |
| 1952–53 | Edmonton Flyers | WHL | 26 | 2 | 1 | 3 | 49 | — | — | — | — | — |
| 1952–53 | Detroit Red Wings | NHL | 42 | 1 | 4 | 5 | 2 | 4 | 0 | 0 | 0 | 2 |
| 1953–54 | Detroit Red Wings | NHL | 12 | 0 | 0 | 0 | 0 | — | — | — | — | — |
| 1953–54 | Sherbrooke Saints | QSHL | 54 | 4 | 6 | 10 | 98 | 5 | 0 | 0 | 0 | 10 |
| 1954–55 | Quebec Aces | QSHL | 38 | 5 | 13 | 18 | 107 | — | — | — | — | — |
| 1954–55 | Detroit Red Wings | NHL | 21 | 0 | 1 | 1 | 20 | 5 | 1 | 0 | 1 | 0 |
| 1955–56 | Regina/Brandon Regals | WHL | 70 | 7 | 7 | 14 | 158 | — | — | — | — | — |
| 1956–57 | Edmonton Flyers | WHL | 52 | 3 | 13 | 16 | 120 | — | — | — | — | — |
| 1957–58 | Troy Bruins | IHL | 64 | 14 | 29 | 43 | 125 | — | — | — | — | — |
| 1958–59 | Vancouver Canucks | WHL | 67 | 5 | 23 | 28 | 110 | 3 | 0 | 1 | 1 | 4 |
| 1959–60 | Vancouver Canucks | WHL | 70 | 4 | 19 | 23 | 118 | 11 | 1 | 2 | 3 | 17 |
| 1960–61 | Vancouver Canucks | WHL | 70 | 7 | 21 | 28 | 88 | 5 | 0 | 0 | 0 | 0 |
| 1961–62 | San Francisco Seals | WHL | 61 | 4 | 16 | 20 | 101 | 2 | 0 | 1 | 1 | 0 |
| 1962–63 | Seattle Totems | WHL | 70 | 9 | 21 | 30 | 109 | 17 | 2 | 5 | 7 | 10 |
| 1963–64 | Seattle Totems | WHL | 70 | 3 | 6 | 9 | 65 | — | — | — | — | — |
| 1964–65 | Portland Buckaroos | WHL | 64 | 2 | 15 | 17 | 115 | 10 | 0 | 4 | 4 | 14 |
| 1965–66 | Portland Buckaroos | WHL | 72 | 3 | 20 | 23 | 115 | 14 | 0 | 1 | 1 | 8 |
| 1966–67 | Portland Buckaroos | WHL | 51 | 1 | 9 | 10 | 49 | — | — | — | — | — |
| 1967–68 | Portland Buckaroos | WHL | 72 | 5 | 18 | 23 | 75 | 12 | 0 | 2 | 2 | 15 |
| 1968–69 | Portland Buckaroos | WHL | 74 | 0 | 23 | 23 | 71 | 10 | 0 | 2 | 2 | 17 |
| 1969–70 | Salt Lake Golden Eagles | WHL | 61 | 2 | 7 | 9 | 105 | — | — | — | — | — |
| 1969–70 | Portland Buckaroos | WHL | — | — | — | — | — | 3 | 1 | 1 | 2 | 6 |
| 1970–71 | Salt Lake Golden Eagles | WHL | 11 | 1 | 0 | 1 | 14 | — | — | — | — | — |
| 1970–71 | Jersey Devils | EHL | 18 | 1 | 6 | 7 | 37 | — | — | — | — | — |
| 1971–72 | Jersey Devils | EHL | 74 | 2 | 18 | 20 | 134 | — | — | — | — | — |
| 1972–73 | Jersey Devils | EHL | — | — | — | — | — | — | — | — | — | — |
| WHL totals | | | 961 | 58 | 219 | 277 | 1462 | 87 | 4 | 19 | 23 | 91 |
| NHL totals | | | 75 | 1 | 5 | 6 | 22 | 9 | 1 | 0 | 1 | 2 |
