= Yip Foster =

Canadian ice hockey player

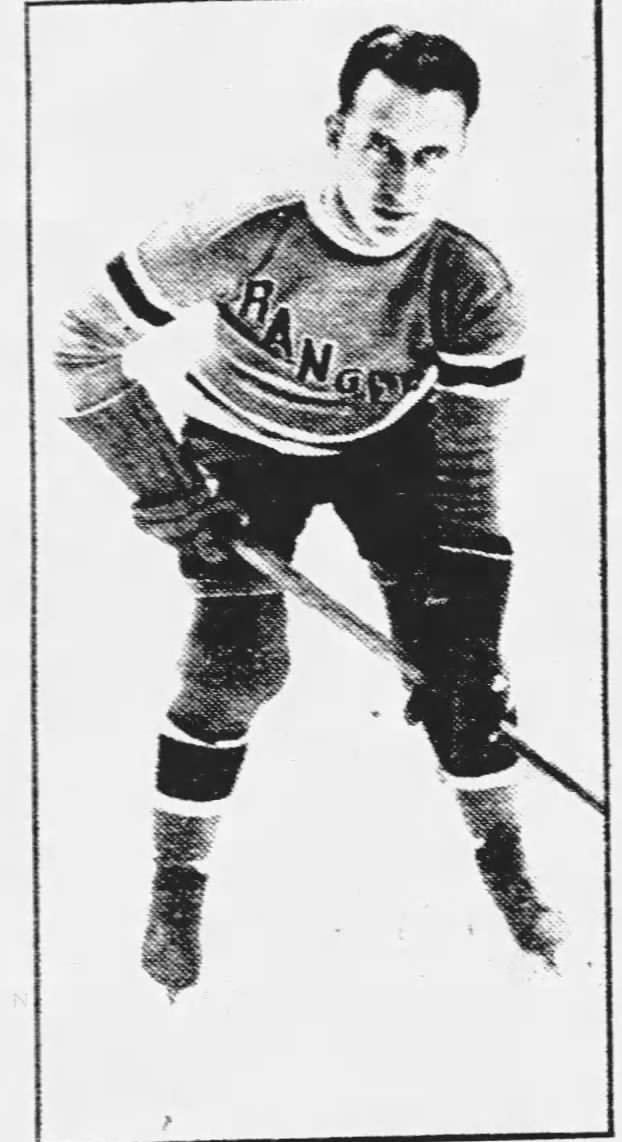
- Foster in 1929
- Born: November 25, 1907 Guelph, Ontario, Canada
- Died: June 4, 1978 (aged 70) Naples, Florida, U.S.
- Height: 6 ft 6 in (198 cm)
- Weight: 198 lb (90 kg; 14 st 2 lb)
- Position: Defence
- Shot: Left
- Played for: Toronto Balmy Beach Beachers; Detroit Red Wings; Boston Bruins; New York Rangers
- Playing career: 1927–1947

Harry Clifford Francis "Yip" Foster (November 25, 1907 – June 4, 1978) was a Canadian ice hockey player who played for the Detroit Red Wings, Boston Bruins and New York Rangers in the National Hockey League between 1929 and 1935. The rest of his career, which lasted from 1927 to 1947, was spent in various minor leagues. He also played Canadian football (known as rugby football at the time) with the Toronto Balmy Beach Beachers of the Ontario Rugby Football Union from 1924 to 1930, and won the Grey Cup in 1927. Prior to his playing career Foster attended Malvern Collegiate Institute.

In later years, Foster owned and ran a grocery store with his family in Wayne, Michigan.

== Career statistics ==
=== Regular season and playoffs ===
			Regular season					Playoffs
Season	Team	League	GP	G	A	Pts	PIM	GP	G	A	Pts	PIM
1923–44	Toronto Canoe Club	OHA	1	0	0	0	—	—	—	—	—	—
1924–25	Toronto Aura Lee	OHA	7	2	1	3	—	10	4	4	8	—
1925–26	Toronto Aura Lee	OHA	7	2	1	3	—	—	—	—	—	—
1926–27	Toronto City Hall	TIHL	—	—	—	—	—	—	—	—	—	—
1927–28	Springfield Indians	Can-Am	37	1	1	2	40	4	1	0	1	8
1928–29	Springfield Indians	Can-Am	38	5	1	6	83	—	—	—	—	—
1929–30	New York Rangers	NHL	31	0	0	0	10	—	—	—	—	—
1929–30	Boston Tigers	Can-Am	11	2	4	6	10	5	0	0	0	0
1930–31	Boston Tigers	Can-Am	36	7	13	20	80	9	3	5	8	28
1931–32	Boston Bruins	NHL	32	1	2	3	12	—	—	—	—	—
1932–33	Boston Cubs	Can-Am	12	2	3	5	34	—	—	—	—	—
1932–33	St. Paul Greyhounds	AHA	24	4	3	7	23	4	0	1	1	4
1933–34	Detroit Red Wings	NHL	6	0	0	0	2	—	—	—	—	—
1933–34	Detroit Olympics	IHL	37	4	8	12	35	6	0	1	1	4
1934–35	Detroit Red Wings	NHL	12	2	0	2	8	—	—	—	—	—
1934–35	Detroit Olympics	IHL	30	7	2	9	27	5	0	2	2	6
1935–36	Detroit Olympics	IHL	47	4	12	16	31	6	0	2	2	6
1936–637	Cleveland Falcons	IAHL	44	3	15	18	27	—	—	—	—	—
1937–38	Cleveland Barons	IAHL	52	2	12	14	34	2	0	0	0	0
1938–39	Cleveland Barons	IAHL	52	2	12	14	34	9	0	1	1	0
1939–40	Syracuse Stars	IAHL	55	2	11	13	14	—	—	—	—	—
1940–41	Minneapolis Millers	AHA	47	4	5	9	10	3	0	0	0	0
1941–42	Minneapolis Millers	AHA	44	5	6	11	17	—	—	—	—	—
1942–43	Cleveland Barons	AHL	53	1	8	9	14	1	0	0	0	0
1943–44	Cleveland Barons	AHL	34	1	5	6	16	10	0	1	1	7
1946–47	Detroit Metal Mouldings	IHL	26	1	8	9	13	3	0	0	0	0
IAHL/AHL totals			202	15	27	42	80	18	0	2	2	11
NHL totals			81	3	2	5	38	—	—	—	—	—
