= Jim Ross (ice hockey) =

Scottish-born Canadian ice hockey player

- Born: May 20, 1926 Edinburgh, Scotland, UK
- Died: January 1, 2016 (aged 89) Woodstock, Ontario, Canada
- Height: 6 ft 3 in (191 cm)
- Weight: 185 lb (84 kg; 13 st 3 lb)
- Position: Defence
- Shot: Right
- Played for: New York Rangers
- Playing career: 1944–1955

James Ross (May 20, 1926 – January 1, 2016) was a Canadian professional ice hockey player who played 62 games in the National Hockey League with the New York Rangers during the 1951–52 and 1952–53 seasons. He was born in Edinburgh, Scotland, and raised in Toronto, Ontario. He died in 2016.

== Career statistics ==
=== Regular season and playoffs ===
			Regular season					Playoffs
Season	Team	League	GP	G	A	Pts	PIM	GP	G	A	Pts	PIM
1944–45	De La Salle College	HS-CA	11	0	4	4	12	2	0	0	0	0
1945–46	De La Salle College	HS-CA	8	5	9	14	6	14	2	6	8	8
1946–47	Perth Panthers	SNL	—	18	19	37	45	8	8	3	11	19
1947–48	Detroit Metal Mouldings	IHL	30	7	13	20	35	3	0	1	1	6
1948–49	Detroit Jerry Lynch	IHL	31	9	20	29	38	2	0	1	1	0
1949–50	Sydney Millionaires	CBSHL	72	14	31	45	81	5	1	2	3	6
1949–50	Sydney Millionaires	Al-Cup	—	—	—	—	—	9	6	2	8	8
1950–51	Quebec Aces	QSHL	50	6	21	27	62	19	1	4	5	16
1951–52	New York Rangers	NHL	51	2	9	11	25	—	—	—	—	—
1951–52	Cincinnati Mohawks	AHL	7	0	3	3	4	—	—	—	—	—
1952–53	New York Rangers	NHL	11	0	2	2	4	—	—	—	—	—
1952–53	Saskatoon Quakers	WHL	42	3	10	13	40	13	1	7	8	12
1953–54	Saskatoon Quakers	WHL	57	5	17	22	38	6	2	1	3	2
1954–55	Saskatoon Quakers	WHL	65	6	11	17	31	—	—	—	—	—
WHL totals			164	14	38	52	109	19	3	8	11	14
NHL totals			62	2	11	13	29	—	—	—	—	—

== See also ==
- List of National Hockey League players from the United Kingdom
