= Tom McGrattan =

Canadian ice hockey player (1927–2022)

- Born: October 19, 1927; Brantford, Ontario, Canada
- Died: December 22, 2022 (aged 95)
- Height: 6 ft 2 in (188 cm)
- Weight: 170 lb (77 kg; 12 st 2 lb)
- Position: Goaltender
- Caught: Left
- Played for: Detroit Red Wings
- Playing career: 1946–1950

Thomas Henry McGrattan (October 19, 1927 – December 22, 2022) was a Canadian ice hockey goaltender who played in one National Hockey League game for the Detroit Red Wings during the 1947–48 season, on November 9, 1947 against the Toronto Maple Leafs. The rest of his career lasted from 1946 to 1950 and was spent in the minor leagues. McGrattan died on December 22, 2022, at the age of 95.

== Career statistics ==
=== Regular season and playoffs ===
			Regular season								Playoffs
Season	Team	League	GP	W	L	T	Min	GA	SO	GAA	GP	W	L	Min	GA	SO	GAA
1944–45	Brantford Lions	OHA-B	12	10	2	0	720	37	0	3.17	4	1	3	240	20	0	5.00
1945–46	Galt Red Wings	OHA	21	—	—	—	1260	66	2	3.14	3	—	—	180	14	0	4.67
1946–47	Windsor Spitfires	OHA	16	—	—	—	960	62	0	3.87	—	—	—	—	—	—	—
1946–47	Windsor Spitfires	IHL	3	2	1	0	180	17	0	5.67	—	—	—	—	—	—	—
1946–47	Stratford Kroehlers	OHA	—	—	—	—	—	—	—	—	2	0	2	120	10	0	5.00
1947–48	Detroit Red Wings	NHL	1	0	0	0	8	1	0	7.83	—	—	—	—	—	—
1947–48	Detroit Bright's Goodyears	IHL	15	—	—	—	900	75	1	5.00	2	0	2	120	11	0	5.50
1948–49	Owen Sound Mercurys	OHA Sr	25	—	—	—	1500	125	0	5.00	4	—	—	240	26	0	6.50
1949–50	Brantford Nationals	OHA Sr-B	—	—	—	—	—	—	—	—	—	—	—	—	—	—	—
NHL totals			1	0	0	0	8	1	0	7.83	—	—	—	—	—	—	—

== See also ==
- List of players who played only one game in the NHL
