= Gordon Haidy =

Canadian ice hockey player

- Born: April 11, 1928 Windsor, Ontario, Canada
- Died: October 4, 2004 (aged 76) Windsor, Ontario, Canada
- Height: 5 ft 11 in (180 cm)
- Weight: 185 lb (84 kg; 13 st 3 lb)
- Position: Right wing
- Shot: Right
- Played for: Detroit Red Wings
- Playing career: 1945–1964

Gordon Adam Haidy (April 11, 1928 – October 6, 2004) was a Canadian ice hockey right wing. He played one playoff game in the National Hockey League with the Detroit Red Wings on April 4, 1950 against the Toronto Maple Leafs. The rest of his career, which lasted from 1945 to 1964, was spent in the minor leagues.

Gord Haidy is one of the first three hockey players who played their only NHL game in the playoffs for a Stanley Cup winning and Calder Cup winning teams.

== Career statistics ==
=== Regular season and playoffs ===
| | | | Regular season | | | | | Playoffs |
| Season | Team | League | GP | G | A | Pts | PIM | GP | G | A | Pts | PIM |
|---|---|---|---|---|---|---|---|---|---|---|---|---|
| 1945–46 | Windsor Spitfires | IHL | 15 | 9 | 6 | 15 | 22 | — | — | — | — | — |
| 1946–47 | Windsor Spitfires | OHA | 15 | 23 | 7 | 30 | 15 | — | — | — | — | — |
| 1946–47 | Windsor Spitfires | IHL | 26 | 31 | 25 | 56 | 36 | — | — | — | — | — |
| 1947–48 | Windsor Spitfires | OHA | 28 | 38 | 19 | 57 | 43 | — | — | — | — | — |
| 1947–48 | Windsor Hettche Spitfires | IHL | 25 | 32 | 11 | 43 | 48 | — | — | — | — | — |
| 1948–49 | Omaha Knights | USHL | 6 | 4 | 4 | 7 | 0 | — | — | — | — | — |
| 1948–49 | Indianapolis Capitals | AHL | 48 | 14 | 10 | 24 | 51 | 2 | 0 | 0 | 0 | 0 |
| 1949–50 | Indianapolis Capitals | AHL | 47 | 20 | 10 | 30 | 32 | 8 | 5 | 1 | 6 | 4 |
| 1949–50 | Detroit Red Wings | NHL | — | — | — | — | — | 1 | 0 | 0 | 0 | 0 |
| 1950–51 | Indianapolis Capitals | AHL | 56 | 26 | 18 | 44 | 40 | 3 | 0 | 0 | 0 | 0 |
| 1952–53 | New Westminster Royals | WHL | 18 | 6 | 4 | 10 | 14 | — | — | — | — | — |
| 1952–53 | Buffalo Bisons | AHL | 10 | 0 | 0 | 0 | 4 | — | — | — | — | — |
| 1953–54 | Windsor Bulldogs | OHA Sr | 54 | 47 | 33 | 80 | 191 | 3 | 0 | 1 | 1 | 2 |
| 1954–55 | Windsor Bulldogs | OHA Sr | 48 | 30 | 30 | 60 | 0 | — | — | — | — | — |
| 1955–56 | Windsor Bulldogs | OHA Sr | 48 | 23 | 27 | 50 | 0 | — | — | — | — | — |
| 1956–57 | Windsor Bulldogs | OHA Sr | 52 | 28 | 30 | 58 | 0 | — | — | — | — | — |
| 1957–58 | Chatham Maroons | OHA Sr | 58 | 22 | 25 | 47 | 91 | — | — | — | — | — |
| 1958–59 | Windsor Bulldogs | OHA Sr | 27 | 9 | 15 | 24 | 45 | — | — | — | — | — |
| 1959–60 | Windsor Bulldogs | OHA Sr | — | — | — | — | — | — | — | — | — | — |
| 1960–61 | Milwaukee Falcons/Indianapolis Chiefs | IHL | 14 | 5 | 6 | 11 | 8 | — | — | — | — | — |
| 1960–61 | Windsor Bulldogs | OHA Sr | 20 | 14 | 5 | 19 | 6 | — | — | — | — | — |
| 1961–62 | Windsor Bulldogs | OHA Sr | 17 | 13 | 12 | 25 | 16 | — | — | — | — | — |
| 1962–63 | Sarnia Rams | OHA Sr | 6 | 3 | 4 | 7 | 2 | — | — | — | — | — |
| 1963–64 | Windsor Bulldogs | IHL | 17 | 7 | 4 | 11 | 18 | — | — | — | — | — |
| NHL totals | | | — | — | — | — | — | 1 | 0 | 0 | 0 | 0 |

== See also ==
- List of players who played only one game in the NHL
