= Johnny Wilson (ice hockey) =

Canadian ice hockey player (1929–2011)

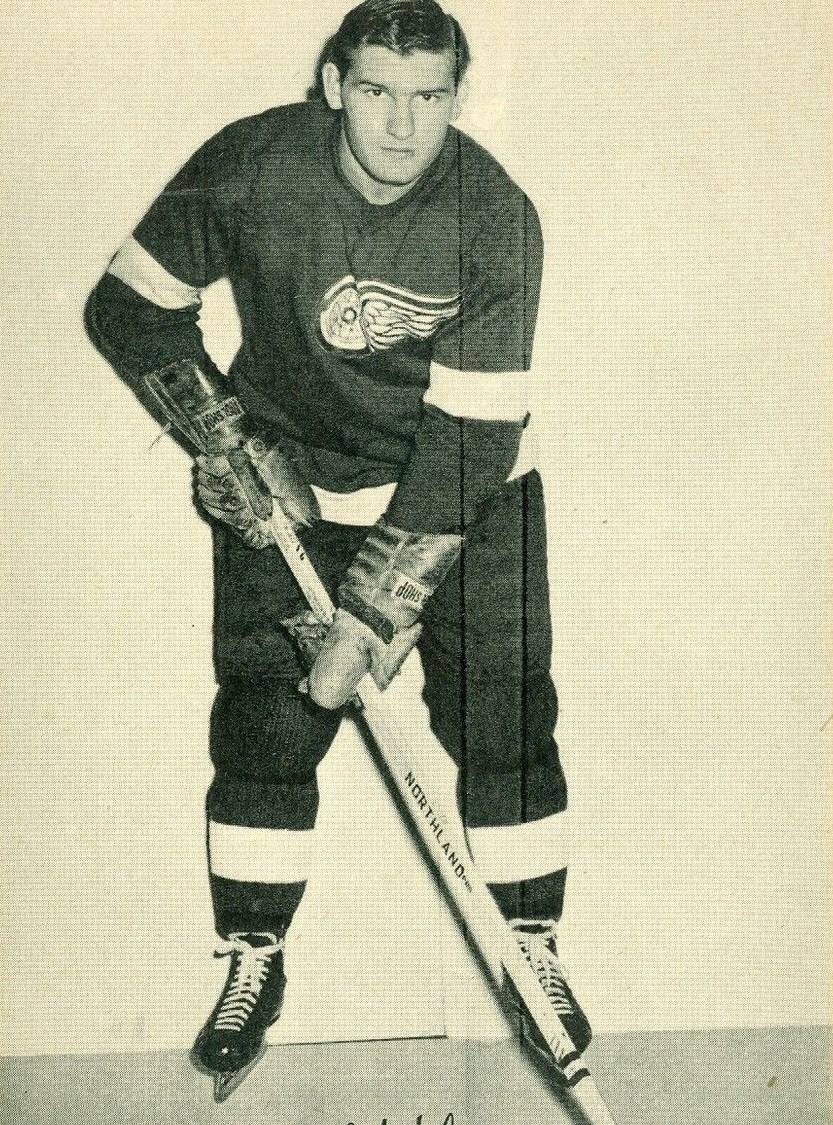
- Wilson with the Detroit Red Wings
- Born: June 14, 1929 Kincardine, Ontario, Canada
- Died: December 27, 2011 (aged 82) Livonia, Michigan, U.S.
- Height: 5 ft 10 in (178 cm)
- Weight: 165 lb (75 kg; 11 st 11 lb)
- Position: Left wing
- Shot: Left
- Played for: Detroit Red Wings; Chicago Black Hawks; Toronto Maple Leafs; New York Rangers
- Playing career: 1947–1962 Coaching career

Coaching career (HC unless noted)
- 1965–1967: Princeton
- 1967–1969: Springfield Kings
- 1969–1970: Los Angeles Kings
- 1970–1971: Springfield Kings
- 1971: Tidewater Wings
- 1971–1973: Detroit Red Wings
- 1974–1975: Michigan Stags/Baltimore Blades
- 1975–1976: Cleveland Crusaders
- 1976–1977: Colorado Rockies
- 1977–1980: Pittsburgh Penguins
- 1980–1981: Springfield Indians

Head coaching record
- Overall: 14–27–1 (.345) [College]

John Edward Wilson (June 14, 1929 – December 27, 2011) was a Canadian professional ice hockey player and head coach. He played in the National Hockey League (NHL) with the Detroit Red Wings, Chicago Black Hawks, Toronto Maple Leafs, and New York Rangers between 1950 and 1962. With Detroit, Wilson won the Stanley Cup four times. After his playing career, he coached in the NHL with the Los Angeles Kings, Detroit, the Colorado Rockies, and Pittsburgh Penguins between 1969 and 1980. He also coached the Michigan Stags/Baltimore Blades and Cleveland Crusaders of the World Hockey Association between 1974 and 1976, and the Canadian national team at the 1977 World Championship. Wilson was born in Kincardine, Ontario, but grew up in Shawinigan Falls, Quebec.

== Playing career ==
After three seasons with the Windsor Spitfires, Wilson signed his first professional contract with the Detroit Red Wings of the National Hockey League in September 1949, but spent most of the 1949–50 season with their farm team, the Omaha Knights. He was called up by the Red Wings late in the season and helped them win the Stanley Cup. After spending most of the 1950–51 season in the minors, Wilson joined the Red Wings on a full-time basis midway through the 1951–52 season and went on to help them win three more Stanley Cups (1952, 1954, 1955).

Soon after winning the Stanley Cup in 1955, Red Wings general manager Jack Adams traded Wilson to the Chicago Black Hawks as part of an eight-player swap. After two solid seasons in Chicago, he was reacquired by the Red Wings in the infamous Ted Lindsay trade and played two more seasons with the Red Wings before being traded to the Toronto Maple Leafs in 1959. A year later, the Leafs sent Wilson to the New York Rangers, along with another player, for Eddie Shack. After two seasons with the Rangers, Wilson retired following the 1961–62 season.

During his NHL career, Wilson scored 161 goals and 171 assists in 688 regular-season games and 27 points in 66 playoff games. He won the Stanley Cup four times with the Red Wings and appeared in two all-star games (1954, 1956). One of his most notable accomplishments was playing in 580 consecutive games between 1951 and 1960, making him the NHL's second "iron man".

== Coaching career ==
In 1967, Wilson was hired as the head coach of the Springfield Kings of the American Hockey League, the minor league affiliate of the new Los Angeles Kings expansion team. Midway into his third season with Springfield, Wilson was promoted to interim head coach of the Los Angeles Kings after Hal Laycoe was fired following a dismal start to the season. However, Wilson was unable to turn the team around and returned to Springfield after the season was finished. He ended up leading Springfield to a Calder Cup title the very next season.

After winning the Calder Cup in 1971, Wilson was hired by the Detroit Red Wings during the 1971–72 season as a midseason replacement. Despite having a winning record behind the Wings' bench, the team missed the playoffs two straight seasons and Wilson was let go. It would be 15 years before another Red Wings' coach would better Wilson's record.

From there, he spent two years in the World Hockey Association, one with the Michigan Stags/Baltimore Blades (1974–75) and one with the Cleveland Crusaders (1975–76). He returned to the NHL, coaching one season with the Colorado Rockies (1976–77), and three with the Pittsburgh Penguins (1977–80), where he led the Penguins to two playoff appearances. Wilson returned to coach Springfield one more season and then retired from coaching in 1981.

Wilson was named coach the Canadian national team at the 1977 World Championships in Vienna, following a search by Hockey Canada executive Derek Holmes who wanted a coach " that would bring new ideas to the national team". Canada made its first appearance at the World Championships since 1969, and finished fourth. The team was composed entirely of players whose teams had not qualified for the Stanley Cup playoffs.

== Personal ==
Johnny was the brother of Larry Wilson and uncle of Ron Wilson, both of whom played and coached in the NHL.

Wilson made his home in the Detroit area, together with his wife Pat, and was frequently seen at Red Wings home games. The couple has two children, a son, Kelly, and a daughter, Tracy. Tracy A. Wilson, a former TV writer and show host, is currently writing a book - a true story that sent her on a journey into her father's life and led her to discover parts of her own as well. She also writes a blog called Tracy Wilson Writing Life.

On December 27, 2011, Johnny died of pulmonary fibrosis at the age of 82. He had battled lung disease and colon cancer for several years.

== Career statistics ==
=== Regular season and playoffs ===
			Regular season					Playoffs
Season	Team	League	GP	G	A	Pts	PIM	GP	G	A	Pts	PIM
1947–48	Windsor Spitfires	OHA	34	23	28	51	15	12	4	6	10	11
1947–48	Windsor Hettche Spitfires	IHL	25	21	13	34	19	—	—	—	—	—
1948–49	Windsor Spitfires	OHA	25	30	20	50	24	4	1	0	1	2
1948–49	Windsor Hettche Spitfires	IHL	4	5	4	9	0	13	16	7	23	16
1949–50	Detroit Red Wings	NHL	1	0	0	0	0	8	0	1	1	0
1949–50	Omaha Knights	USHL	70	41	39	80	46	7	2	5	7	4
1950–51	Indianapolis Capitals	AHL	70	34	21	55	48	3	1	0	1	4
1950–51	Detroit Red Wings	NHL	—	—	—	—	—	1	0	0	0	0
1951–52	Detroit Red Wings	NHL	28	4	5	9	18	8	4	1	5	5
1951–52	Indianapolis Capitals	AHL	42	25	14	39	16	—	—	—	—	—
1952–53	Detroit Red Wings	NHL	70	23	19	42	22	6	2	5	7	0
1953–54	Detroit Red Wings	NHL	70	17	17	34	22	12	3	0	3	0
1954–55	Detroit Red Wings	NHL	70	12	15	27	14	11	0	1	1	0
1955–56	Chicago Black Hawks	NHL	70	24	9	33	12	—	—	—	—	—
1956–57	Chicago Black Hawks	NHL	70	18	30	48	24	—	—	—	—	—
1957–58	Detroit Red Wings	NHL	70	12	27	39	14	4	2	1	3	0
1958–59	Detroit Red Wings	NHL	70	11	17	28	18	—	—	—	—	—
1959–60	Toronto Maple Leafs	NHL	70	15	16	31	8	10	1	2	3	2
1960–61	Toronto Maple Leafs	NHL	3	0	1	1	0	—	—	—	—	—
1960–61	Rochester Americans	AHL	2	2	2	4	0	—	—	—	—	—
1960–61	New York Rangers	NHL	56	14	12	26	24	—	—	—	—	—
1961–62	New York Rangers	NHL	40	11	3	14	14	6	2	2	4	4
NHL totals			688	161	171	332	190	66	14	13	27	16

== Head coaching record ==
=== College ===
Record table
Season	Team	Overall	Conference	Standing	Postseason
Princeton Tigers (ECAC Hockey) (1965–1967)
1965–66	Princeton	7–12–1	6–12–1	12th	
1966–67	Princeton	7–15–0	6–14–0	13th	
Princeton:		14–27–1	12–26–1		
Total:		14–27–1			

=== NHL/WHA ===
Team	Year	Regular season						Postseason			
Team	Year	G	W	L	T	Pts	Finish	W	L	Win %	Result
LAK	1969–70	52	9	34	9	27	6th in West	—	—	—	Missed playoffs
DET	1971–72	76	30	27	10	70	5th in East	—	—	—	Missed playoffs
DET	1972–73	78	37	29	12	86	5th in East	—	—	—	Missed playoffs
MIB	1974–75	78	21	53	4	46	5th in West	—	—	—	Missed playoffs
CLC	1975–76	80	35	40	5	75	2nd in East	0	3	.000	Lost in preliminary round (NEW)
CLR	1976–77	80	20	46	14	54	5th in Smythe	—	—	—	Missed playoffs
PIT	1977–78	80	25	37	18	68	4th in Norris	—	—	—	Missed playoffs
PIT	1978–79	80	36	31	13	85	2nd in Norris	2	5	.286	Lost in quarter-finals (BOS)
PIT	1979–80	80	30	37	13	73	3rd in Norris	2	3	.400	Lost in preliminary round (BOS)
WHA totals		158	56	93	9			0	3	.000	
NHL totals		517	187	241	89			4	8	.333	
Total		675	243	334	98			4	11	.267	

Sporting positions
Preceded by Doug Barkley	Head coach of the Detroit Red Wings; 1971–73	Succeeded by Ted Garvin
Preceded by Hal Laycoe	Head coach of the Los Angeles Kings; 1969–70	Succeeded by Larry Regan
Preceded by Eddie Bush	Head coach of the Colorado Rockies; 1976–77	Succeeded by Patrick J. Kelly
Preceded by Ken Schinkel	Head coach of the Pittsburgh Penguins; 1977–80	Succeeded by Eddie Johnston
