= Troy Mallette =

Canadian ice hockey player

- Born: February 25, 1970 (age 56) Levack, Ontario, Canada
- Height: 6 ft 3 in (191 cm)
- Weight: 219 lb (99 kg; 15 st 9 lb)
- Position: Left wing
- Shot: Left
- Played for: New York Rangers; Edmonton Oilers; New Jersey Devils; Ottawa Senators; Boston Bruins; Tampa Bay Lightning
- NHL draft: 22nd overall, 1988; New York Rangers
- Playing career: 1989–1998

Troy Matthew Mallette (born February 25, 1970) is a Canadian former professional ice hockey player. Mallette played in the National Hockey League for the New York Rangers, Edmonton Oilers, New Jersey Devils, Ottawa Senators, Boston Bruins and the Tampa Bay Lightning.

== Playing career ==
Mallette was drafted 22nd overall by the Rangers in the 1988 NHL entry draft and played 456 regular season games in his professional career, scoring 51 goals and 68 assists for 119 points and collecting 1226 penalty minutes. While playing for Tampa Bay, he suffered a back injury against the Chicago Blackhawks on October 25, 1997, that eventually forced him to retire. Mallette remains the Rangers' single season leader in penalty minutes with 305, which he set during the 1989-90 season, his first in the NHL.

== Personal life ==
Troy currently lives in Onaping Falls, Ontario. He is married to Lynn Mallette with two children, Trent and Tory. He is a retired firefighter from the Greater Sudbury Fire Department.

== Career statistics ==
=== Regular season and playoffs ===
			Regular season					Playoffs
Season	Team	League	GP	G	A	Pts	PIM	GP	G	A	Pts	PIM
1986–87	Sault Ste. Marie Greyhounds	OHL	60	20	25	45	157	4	0	2	2	2
1987–88	Sault Ste. Marie Greyhounds	OHL	62	18	30	48	184	6	1	3	4	12
1988–89	Sault Ste. Marie Greyhounds	OHL	64	39	37	76	172	—	—	—	—	—
1989–90	New York Rangers	NHL	79	13	16	29	305	10	2	2	4	81
1990–91	New York Rangers	NHL	71	12	10	22	252	5	0	0	0	18
1991–92	Edmonton Oilers	NHL	15	1	3	4	36	—	—	—	—	—
1991–92	New Jersey Devils	NHL	17	3	4	7	43	—	—	—	—	—
1992–93	Utica Devils	AHL	5	3	3	6	17	—	—	—	—	—
1992–93	New Jersey Devils	NHL	34	4	3	7	56	—	—	—	—	—
1993–94	Ottawa Senators	NHL	82	7	16	23	166	—	—	—	—	—
1994–95	Prince Edward Island Senators	AHL	5	1	5	6	9	—	—	—	—	—
1994–95	Ottawa Senators	NHL	23	3	5	8	35	—	—	—	—	—
1995–96	Ottawa Senators	NHL	64	2	3	5	171	—	—	—	—	—
1996–97	Boston Bruins	NHL	68	6	8	14	155	—	—	—	—	—
1997–98	Tampa Bay Lightning	NHL	3	0	0	0	7	—	—	—	—	—
NHL totals			456	51	68	119	1226	15	2	2	4	99

Awards and achievements
Preceded by Bryan Fogarty	Jack Ferguson Award; 1986	Succeeded by John Uniac
