= Glen Skov =

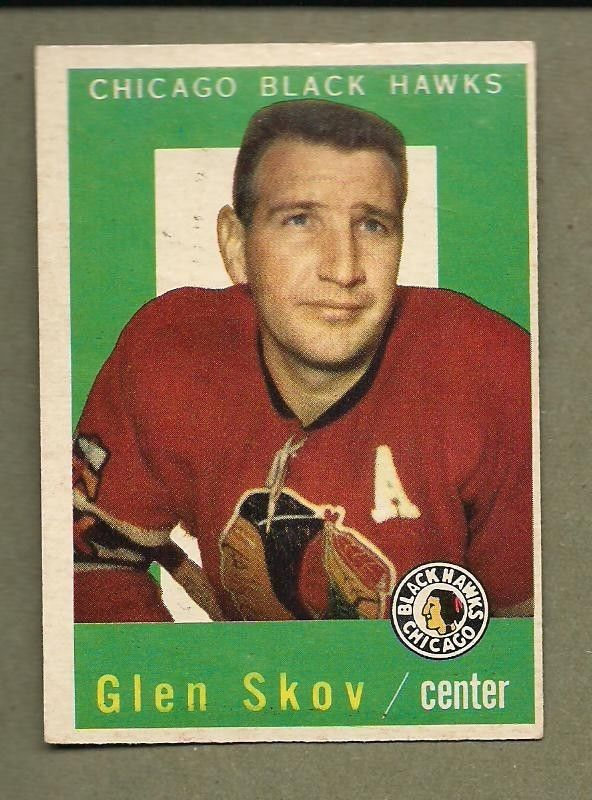
- Born: January 26, 1931 Wheatley, Ontario, Canada
- Died: September 10, 2013 (aged 82) Palm Harbor, Florida, U.S.
- Height: 6 ft 1 in (185 cm)
- Weight: 185 lb (84 kg; 13 st 3 lb)
- Position: Center
- Shot: Left
- Played for: Detroit Red Wings; Chicago Black Hawks; Montreal Canadiens
- Playing career: 1947–1961

Glen Frederick Skov (January 26, 1931 – September 10, 2013) was a professional ice hockey player. He played as a centre for 12 seasons in the National Hockey League (NHL) for the Detroit Red Wings, Chicago Black Hawks and Montreal Canadiens. Skov won three Stanley Cup championships with Detroit in 1952, 1954 and 1955. His was the younger brother of referee Art Skov.

Skov split his first two seasons between Detroit and the minor leagues before playing four full seasons with Detroit. He then moved to Chicago where he played for five seasons. His final season comprised a mere three games with the Montreal Canadiens. He died on September 10, 2013, in Palm Harbor, Florida.

== Career statistics ==
			Regular season					Playoffs
Season	Team	League	GP	G	A	Pts	PIM	GP	G	A	Pts	PIM
1946–47	Windsor Spitfires	OHA-Jr.	2	0	0	0	0	—	—	—	—	—
1947–48	Detroit Hettche	IHL	18	4	4	8	8	8	5	3	8	6
1948–49	Windsor Spitfires	OHA-Jr.	35	16	12	28	42	4	0	0	0	2
1948–49	Windsor Ryancretes	IHL	11	2	7	9	4	3	0	6	6	0
1949–50	Detroit Red Wings	NHL	2	0	0	0	0	—	—	—	—	—
1950–51	Detroit Red Wings	NHL	19	7	6	13	13	6	0	0	0	0
1950–51	Omaha Knights	USHL	45	26	33	59	55	—	—	—	—	—
1951–52	Detroit Red Wings	NHL	70	12	14	26	48	8	1	4	5	16
1952–53	Detroit Red Wings	NHL	70	12	15	27	54	6	1	0	1	2
1953–54	Detroit Red Wings	NHL	70	17	10	27	95	12	1	2	3	16
1954–55	Detroit Red Wings	NHL	70	14	16	30	53	11	2	0	2	8
1955–56	Chicago Black Hawks	NHL	70	7	20	27	26	—	—	—	—	—
1956–57	Chicago Black Hawks	NHL	67	14	28	42	69	—	—	—	—	—
1957–58	Chicago Black Hawks	NHL	70	17	18	35	35	—	—	—	—	—
1958–59	Chicago Black Hawks	NHL	70	3	5	8	4	6	2	1	3	4
1959–60	Chicago Black Hawks	NHL	69	3	4	7	16	4	0	0	0	2
1960–61	Montreal Canadiens	NHL	3	0	0	0	0	—	—	—	—	—
1960–61	Hull-Ottawa Canadiens	EPHL	67	16	26	42	24	14	2	6	8	2
NHL totals			650	106	136	242	413	53	7	7	14	48
