= Scott McCrory =

Canadian ice hockey player

- Born: February 27, 1967 (age 59) Sudbury, Ontario, Canada
- Height: 5 ft 10 in (178 cm)
- Weight: 185 lb (84 kg; 13 st 3 lb)
- Position: Centre
- Shot: Right
- Played for: AHL; Binghamton Whalers; Baltimore Skipjacks; Rochester Americans; Austria; Innsbrucker EV; IHL; Kalamazoo Wings; Houston Aeros; San Francisco Spiders; Manitoba Moose; DEL; SERC Wild Wings; Essen Mosquitoes
- NHL draft: 250th overall, 1986; Washington Capitals
- Playing career: 1987–2001

Scott McCrory (born February 27, 1967) is a Canadian retired professional ice hockey left winger. He was selected by the Washington Capitals in the 12th round (250th overall) of the 1986 NHL entry draft.

== Awards and honours ==
- Eddie Powers Memorial Trophy - OHL's Top Scorer (1986–87)
- Red Tilson Trophy – OHL's Most Outstanding Player (1986–87)
- William Hanley Trophy - OHL's Most Sportsmanlike Player (1986–87)
- George Parsons Trophy - Memorial Cup Most Sportsmanlike Player (1987)

== Career statistics ==
			Regular season					Playoffs
Season	Team	League	GP	G	A	Pts	PIM	GP	G	A	Pts	PIM
1984–85	Oshawa Generals	OHL	64	9	24	33	28	5	1	2	3	0
1985–86	Oshawa Generals	OHL	66	52	80	132	40	6	5	8	13	0
1986–87	Oshawa Generals	OHL	66	51	99	150	35	24	15	22	37	20
1986–87	Oshawa Generals	MC	—	—	—	—	—	3	3	1	4	0
1987–88	Binghamton Whalers	AHL	72	18	33	51	29	4	0	1	1	2
1988–89	Baltimore Skipjacks	AHL	80	38	51	89	25	—	—	—	—	—
1989–90	Rochester Americans	AHL	51	14	41	55	46	13	3	6	9	2
1990–91	Rochester Americans	AHL	58	27	24	51	39	2	0	0	0	0
1991–92	Innsbrucker EV	AUT	33	26	36	62	39	—	—	—	—	—
1992–93	Innsbrucker EV	AUT	38	24	44	68	—	—	—	—	—	—
1993–94	HC Fiemme Cavalese	ITA	20	14	28	42	16	—	—	—	—	—
1994–95	Kalamazoo Wings	IHL	22	3	12	15	12	—	—	—	—	—
1994–95	Houston Aeros	IHL	3	1	4	5	0	4	2	2	4	2
1995–96	Houston Aeros	IHL	25	5	6	11	12	—	—	—	—	—
1995–96	San Francisco Spiders	IHL	51	13	39	52	24	4	3	1	4	2
1996–97	Manitoba Moose	IHL	82	24	47	71	30	—	—	—	—	—
1997–98	SERC Wild Wings	DEL	45	13	23	36	34	8	2	4	6	4
1998–99	SERC Wild Wings	DEL	52	18	27	45	52	—	—	—	—	—
1999–2000	SERC Wild Wings	DEL	56	11	38	49	54	—	—	—	—	—
2000–01	Moskitos Essen	DEL	60	7	35	42	64	—	—	—	—	—
2005–06	Whitby Dunlops	EOSHL	3	1	3	4	2	4	1	4	5	2
2006–07	Whitby Dunlops	EOSHL	4	2	2	4	4	1	0	1	1	6
AHL totals			261	97	149	246	139	19	3	7	10	4
IHL totals			183	46	108	154	78	8	5	3	8	4
DEL totals			213	49	123	172	204	8	2	4	6	4
