= Windsor Spitfires (1946–1953) =

Canadian junior ice hockey team (1946–1953)

- City: Windsor, Ontario
- League: Ontario Hockey Association
- Operated: 1946–1953
- Home arena: Windsor Arena

Franchise history
- 1946–1953: Windsor Spitfires
- 1953–1960: Hamilton Tiger Cubs
- 1960–1974: Hamilton Red Wings
- 1974–1978: Hamilton/St. Catharines Fincups
- 1978–1984: Brantford Alexanders
- 1984–1988: Hamilton Steelhawks
- 1988–1996: Niagara Falls Thunder
- 1996–present: Erie Otters

The Windsor Spitfires were a Canadian junior ice hockey team in the Ontario Hockey Association (OHA) from 1946 to 1953. The team was based in Windsor, Ontario. The Spitfires played home games at the Windsor Arena built in 1924, and twice played in the J. Ross Robertson Cup final.

== History ==
The Windsor Spitfires were founded in 1946 as part of a four-year plan enacted by Lloyd Pollock, the secretary-treasurer of the Windsor City Hockey League. He established a junior league for the 1942–43 season in Windsor, competing at the Junior B-level in the Ontario Hockey Association (OHA). The ultimate goal of Junior A-level team was realized in 1946, for the 1946–47 OHA season. Pollock and business partner Jack Dent obtained franchise rights from the OHA for C$500, and purchased uniform for another $100.

The Spitfires lost its first game 15–0 to the Toronto St. Michael's Majors, but attracted a crowd of 4,062 spectators at the Windsor Arena. Pollock served as the team's general manager, and worked with the Detroit Red Wings to develop players. Pollock convinced the Detroit Red Wings to relocate prospect players from the Galt Red Wings to Windsor in 1947.

The Spitfires were coached by Jimmy Skinner from 1947 to 1953. He led the Spitfires to the J. Ross Robertson Cup final during the 1947–48 OHA season, and 1949–50 OHA season. The team produced several future star players for the Red Wings, including Glenn Hall, Marcel Pronovost, Earl Reibel, Johnny Wilson, and Glen Skov.

In 1953, the Spitfires were sold and relocated becoming the Hamilton Tiger Cubs.

== Players ==
=== Award winners ===
- 1948–49: Bert Giesebrecht, Eddie Powers Memorial Trophy (OHA scoring champion)
- 1949–50: Earl Reibel, Eddie Powers Memorial Trophy (OHA scoring champion)
- 1950–51: Glenn Hall, Red Tilson Trophy (OHA most outstanding player)

=== Notable alumni ===
Notable Spitfires who played in the National Hockey League or World Hockey Association:

- Jim Anderson
- Al Arbour
- Bob Bailey
- Cummy Burton
- Don Cherry
- Gordon Haidy
- Glenn Hall
- Jim Hay
- Larry Hillman
- Vic Howe
- Earl Johnson
- Tom McGrattan
- Doug McKay
- Marcel Pronovost
- Max Quackenbush
- Dutch Reibel
- Dennis Riggin
- Terry Sawchuk
- Glen Skov
- Ed Stankiewicz
- Johnny Wilson
- Larry Wilson

== Season-by-season results ==
Regular season and playoffs results:

Legend: GP = Games played, W = Wins, L = Losses, T = Ties, Pts = Points, GF = Goals for, GA = Goals against

Memorial Cup champions	OHA champions	OHA finalists

Season	Regular season									Playoffs
Season	GP	W	L	T	Pts	Pct	GF	GA	Finish	Playoffs
1946–47	36	10	24	2	22	0.306	75	125	7th OHA	Did not qualify
1947–48	36	29	6	1	59	0.819	231	124	1st OHA	Won semifinal (Oshawa Generals) 4–2; Lost OHA final (Barrie Flyers) 4–2
1948–49	48	34	13	1	69	0.719	272	184	1st OHA	Lost semifinal (Barrie Flyers) 4–0
1949–50	48	34	13	1	69	0.719	307	169	2nd OHA	Won semifinal (Toronto Marlboros) 4–1; Lost OHA final (Guelph Biltmores) 4–2
1950–51	54	32	18	4	68	0.630	209	167	4th OHA	Won quarterfinal (Oshawa Generals) 3–2; Lost semifinal (Barrie Flyers) 3–0
1951–52	54	9	42	3	21	0.194	172	355	9th OHA	Did not qualify
1952–53	56	16	35	5	37	0.330	127	186	8th OHA	Did not qualify

== See also ==
- List of ice hockey teams in Ontario
