= Mike Richard =

Canadian ice hockey player

- Born: July 9, 1966 (age 58); Scarborough, Ontario, Canada
- Height: 5 ft 10 in (178 cm)
- Weight: 190 lb (86 kg; 13 st 8 lb)
- Position: Centre
- Shot: Left
- Played for: Washington Capitals; Zürcher SC; HC Devils Milano; EHC Olten; SC Rapperswil-Jona
- National team: Canada
- NHL draft: Undrafted
- Playing career: 1987–2008

Michael Richard (born July 9, 1966) is a Canadian former professional ice hockey centre. He played seven games in the National Hockey League (NHL) for the Washington Capitals during the 1987–88 and 1989–90 seasons. The rest of his career, which lasted from 1987 to 2008 was mainly spent in the Swiss Nationalliga A. His son, Tanner Richard, also played in the NHL and NLA.

== Career statistics ==
=== Regular season and playoffs ===
			Regular season					Playoffs
Season	Team	League	GP	G	A	Pts	PIM	GP	G	A	Pts	PIM
1982–83	Don Mills Flyers	GTHL	40	25	30	55	10	—	—	—	—	—
1983–84	Toronto Marlboros	OHL	66	19	17	36	12	9	2	1	3	0
1984–85	Toronto Marlboros	OHL	66	31	41	72	15	5	0	0	0	11
1985–86	Toronto Marlboros	OHL	63	32	48	80	28	4	1	1	2	2
1986–87	Toronto Marlboros	OHL	66	57	50	107	38	—	—	—	—	—
1986–87	Baltimore Skipjacks	AHL	9	5	2	7	2	—	—	—	—	—
1987–88	Washington Capitals	NHL	4	0	0	0	0	—	—	—	—	—
1987–88	Binghamton Whalers	AHL	72	46	48	94	23	3	0	3	3	4
1988–89	Baltimore Skipjacks	AHL	80	44	63	107	51	—	—	—	—	—
1989–90	Washington Capitals	NHL	3	0	2	2	2	—	—	—	—	—
1989–90	Baltimore Skipjacks	AHL	53	41	42	83	14	11	4	13	17	6
1990–91	Zürcher SC	NLA	36	28	24	52	18	4	1	4	5	2
1991–92	HC Devils Milano	ITA	18	20	26	46	4	12	7	11	18	4
1991–92	HC Devils Milano	ALP	18	17	23	40	2	2	1	3	4	0
1992–93	EHC Olten	NLB	36	49	45	94	48	7	8	9	17	12
1993–94	EHC Olten	NLA	35	29	19	48	50	—	—	—	—	—
1994–95	EHC Olten	NLB	32	31	38	69	62	—	—	—	—	—
1994–95	Canadian National Team	Intl	4	1	2	3	6	—	—	—	—	—
1995–96	SC Rapperswil-Jona	NLA	36	27	38	65	14	4	0	3	3	7
1996–97	SC Rapperswil-Jona	NLA	41	17	28	45	30	3	1	0	1	0
1997–98	SC Rapperswil-Jona	NLA	22	12	19	31	25	7	5	4	9	4
1998–99	SC Rapperswil-Jona	NLA	41	26	32	58	49	5	1	2	3	2
1999–00	SC Rapperswil-Jona	NLA	45	23	29	52	42	—	—	—	—	—
2000–01	SC Rapperswil-Jona	NLA	43	20	31	51	26	4	0	1	1	2
2001–02	SC Rapperswil-Jona	NLA	38	11	26	37	22	—	—	—	—	—
2002–03	GC Küsnacht Lions	NLB	38	33	37	70	20	5	4	5	9	2
2002–03	ZSC Lions	NLA	—	—	—	—	—	2	0	1	1	0
2003–04	GC Küsnacht Lions	NLB	17	11	15	26	10	—	—	—	—	—
2003–04	ZSC Lions	NLA	26	16	16	32	4	8	3	5	8	2
2004–05	GC Küsnacht Lions	NLB	25	16	24	40	28	1	1	1	2	0
2004–05	ZSC Lions	NLA	2	0	0	0	2	—	—	—	—	—
2005–06	ZSC Lions	NLA	32	8	15	23	20	—	—	—	—	—
2005–06	GC Küsnacht Lions	NLB	4	1	3	4	4	—	—	—	—	—
2006–07	GC Küsnacht Lions	NLB	27	20	27	47	42	3	3	1	4	0
2006–07	ZSC Lions	NLA	1	0	1	1	0	—	—	—	—	—
2007–08	Rapperswil-Jona Lakers II	SWI-5	2	0	1	1	4	—	—	—	—	—
2010–11	Rapperswil-Jona Lakers II	SWI-5	2	0	1	1	4	—	—	—	—	—
NLA totals			398	217	278	495	302	61	23	37	60	55
NHL totals			7	0	2	2	2	—	—	—	—	—

== Award and honours ==
- Dudley "Red" Garrett Memorial Award (1987–88)
- AHL Second All-Star Team (1989–90)
