= John Uniac =

Canadian ice hockey player

- Born: March 29, 1971 (age 55) Stratford, Ontario, Canada
- Height: 6 ft 1 in (185 cm)
- Weight: 203 lb (92 kg; 14 st 7 lb)
- Position: Defence
- Shot: Right
- Played for: ECHL; Winston-Salem Thunderbirds; Wheeling Thunderbirds; Tallahassee Tiger Sharks
- NHL draft: 228th overall, 1990; Montreal Canadiens
- Playing career: 1991–1997

John Uniac (born March 29, 1971) is a Canadian former professional ice hockey defenceman. He was drafted by the Montreal Canadiens in the 11th round (228th overall) of the 1990 NHL entry draft.

Uniac was selected first overall by the Sudbury Wolves in the 1987 Ontario Hockey League (OHL) Priority Selection and played major junior hockey in the OHL from 1987 to 1991 for the Sudbury Wolves and Kitchener Rangers.

Uniac went on to play five seasons in the ECHL where, between 1991 and 1997, he skated with the Winston-Salem Thunderbirds, Wheeling Thunderbirds, and Tallahassee Tiger Sharks, earning 11 goals, 60 assists, and 125 penalty minutes.

== Career statistics ==
			Regular season					Playoffs
Season	Team	League	GP	G	A	Pts	PIM	GP	G	A	Pts	PIM
1985–86	Stratford Cullitons	MWJHL	1	0	0	0	15	—	—	—	—	—
1986–87	Stratford Cullitons	MWJHL	38	2	22	24	57	—	—	—	—	—
1987–88	Sudbury Wolves	OHL	59	4	13	17	28	—	—	—	—	—
1988–89	Sudbury Wolves	OHL	20	1	6	7	13	—	—	—	—	—
1988–89	Kitchener Rangers	OHL	45	5	13	18	32	5	0	2	2	0
1989–90	Kitchener Rangers	OHL	57	9	35	44	38	14	1	1	2	2
1990–91	Kitchener Rangers	OHL	58	12	59	71	53	6	0	3	3	8
1991–92	Winston-Salem Thunderbirds	ECHL	38	4	16	20	39	5	0	2	2	2
1992–93	Wheeling Thunderbirds	ECHL	50	4	21	25	30	—	—	—	—	—
1994–95	Tallahassee Tiger Sharks	ECHL	47	3	16	19	40	13	2	2	4	6
1995–96	Tallahassee Tiger Sharks	ECHL	11	0	3	3	2	—	—	—	—	—
1996–97	Tallahassee Tiger Sharks	ECHL	9	0	4	4	13	—	—	—	—	—
ECHL totals			155	11	60	71	124	18	2	4	6	8

Awards and achievements
Preceded by Troy Mallette	Jack Ferguson Award; 1987	Succeeded by Drake Berehowsky
