= Earl Johnson (ice hockey) =

Canadian ice hockey player

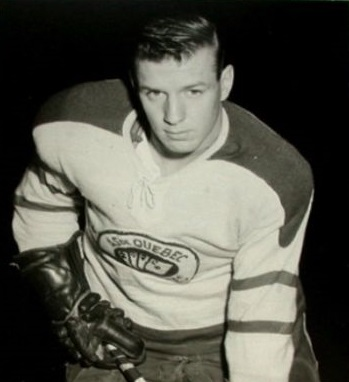
- Born: June 28, 1931; Fort Frances, Ontario, Canada
- Died: February 7, 2015 (aged 83); Kelowna, British Columbia, Canada
- Height: 6 ft 0 in (183 cm)
- Weight: 185 lb (84 kg; 13 st 3 lb)
- Position: Left wing
- Shot: Left
- Played for: Detroit Red Wings
- Playing career: 1949–1964

Earl Otto Johansson (June 28, 1931 – February 7, 2015), better known as "Ching" Johnson, was a Canadian ice hockey player. He played one regular season game in the National Hockey League with the Detroit Red Wings during the 1953–54 season, on March 20, 1954 against the Montreal Canadiens. The rest of his career, which lasted from 1949 to 1965, was spent in various minor leagues.

== Personal life ==
He was the father of actor Paul Johansson, who plays Dan Scott in American TV show One Tree Hill, and comedian Pete Johansson. He had three other children, Eric, James and Fran.

== Career statistics ==
=== Regular season and playoffs ===
			Regular season					Playoffs
Season	Team	League	GP	G	A	Pts	PIM	GP	G	A	Pts	PIM
1948–49	Windsor Spitfires	OHA	54	39	29	68	—	—	—	—	—	—
1949–50	Windsor Spitfires	OHA	42	18	18	36	6	2	1	0	1	0
1949–50	Detroit Hettche	IHL	39	18	16	34	19	—	—	—	—	—
1950–51	Windsor Spitfires	OHA	54	39	29	67	19	8	2	3	5	0
1951–52	Edmonton Flyers	PCHL	69	37	34	71	19	4	0	1	1	2
1952–53	Edmonton Flyers	WHL	70	26	34	60	26	15	10	7	17	20
1953–54	Detroit Red Wings	NHL	1	0	0	0	0	—	—	—	—	—
1953–54	Edmonton Flyers	WHL	19	5	0	5	6	—	—	—	—	—
1953–54	Sherbrooke Saints	QSHL	50	18	22	40	41	5	4	2	6	8
1954–55	Quebec Aces	QSHL	21	12	6	18	18	—	—	—	—	—
1954–55	Vancouver Canucks	WHL	45	16	19	35	33	5	2	1	3	2
1955–56	Springfield Indians	AHL	7	4	2	6	6	—	—	—	—	—
1955–56	Edmonton Flyers	WHL	42	15	10	25	6	3	0	1	1	2
1956–57	Vancouver Canucks	WHL	54	17	14	31	49	—	—	—	—	—
1956–57	Providence Reds	AHL	9	2	4	6	6	—	—	—	—	—
1957–58	Trois Rivieres Lions	QSHL	50	14	8	22	6	—	—	—	—	—
1958–59	Spokane Comets	WHL	67	40	32	72	30	4	0	1	1	4
1959–60	Spokane Comets	WHL	69	31	31	62	20	—	—	—	—	—
1960–61	Spokane Comets	WHL	70	32	30	62	40	4	0	0	0	0
1961–62	Pittsburgh Hornets	AHL	18	3	3	6	2	—	—	—	—	—
1961–62	Los Angeles Blades	WHL	31	9	8	17	2	—	—	—	—	—
1962–63	New Haven Blades	EHL	53	20	25	46	11	—	—	—	—	—
1963–64	Spokane Jets	WIHL	38	41	30	71	4	12	8	8	16	0
WHL totals			467	191	178	369	248	31	12	10	22	28
NHL totals			1	0	0	0	0	—	—	—	—	—

== See also ==
- List of players who played only one game in the NHL
