= 1986–87 OHL season =

Junior ice hockey season

The 1986–87 OHL season was the seventh season of the Ontario Hockey League. Fifteen teams each played 66 games. The Oshawa Generals won the J. Ross Robertson Cup, defeating the North Bay Centennials.

== Regular season ==
=== Final standings ===
Note: GP = Games played; W = Wins; L = Losses; T = Ties; GF = Goals for; GA = Goals against; PTS = Points; x = clinched playoff berth; y = clinched division title;

=== Leyden Division ===
Rank	Team	GP	W	L	T	PTS	GF	GA
1	y-Oshawa Generals	66	49	14	3	101	322	201
2	x-Peterborough Petes	66	35	24	7	77	267	212
3	x-Ottawa 67's	66	33	28	5	71	310	280
4	x-Kingston Canadians	66	26	39	1	53	287	316
5	x-Belleville Bulls	66	26	39	1	53	292	347
6	x-Cornwall Royals	66	23	40	3	49	261	369
7	Toronto Marlboros	66	22	41	3	47	298	376

=== Emms Division ===
Rank	Team	GP	W	L	T	PTS	GF	GA
1	y-North Bay Centennials	66	46	18	2	94	357	216
2	x-Hamilton Steelhawks	66	39	24	3	81	321	258
3	x-Windsor Compuware Spitfires	66	36	25	5	77	287	249
4	x-Kitchener Rangers	66	32	31	3	67	293	305
5	x-Sault Ste. Marie Greyhounds	66	31	31	4	66	301	299
6	x-Guelph Platers	66	29	35	2	60	275	281
7	London Knights	66	25	39	2	52	259	329
8	Sudbury Wolves	66	20	44	2	42	285	377

=== Scoring leaders ===
Player	Team	GP	G	A	Pts	PIM
Scott McCrory	Oshawa Generals	66	51	99	150	35
Dave McLlwain	North Bay Centennials	60	46	73	119	35
Mike Richard	Toronto Marlboros	66	57	50	107	38
Drew Brydle	Oshawa Generals	57	53	53	106	74
Ron Goodall	Kitchener Rangers	66	52	53	105	17
Jean-Marc MacKenzie	London Knights	63	49	56	105	20
Brian Barrett	Sudbury Wolves	63	54	48	102	164
Keith Gretzky	Belleville Bulls/Hamilton Steelhawks	64	35	66	101	18
Adam Graves	Windsor Spitfires	66	45	55	100	70
Jamie Godkin	Oshawa Generals	48	31	69	100	46

== Playoffs ==
Division quarter-finals
L1	Oshawa	bye
L4	Kingston	4
L5	Belleville	2
L2	Peterborough	bye
L3	Ottawa	4
L6	Cornwall	1
E1	North Bay	bye
E4	Kitchener	bye
E2	Hamilton	4
E6	Guelph	1
E3	Windsor	4
E5	Sault Ste. Marie	0

Division semi-finals
L1	Oshawa	4
L4	Kingston	2
L2	Peterborough	4
L3	Ottawa	2
E1	North Bay	4
E4	Kitchener	0
E2	Hamilton	0
E3	Windsor	4

Division finals
L1	Oshawa	4
L2	Peterborough	2
E1	North Bay	4
E3	Windsor	2

J. Ross Robertson Cup
L1	Oshawa	4
E1	North Bay	3

=== OHL Superseries ===
The winner of the OHL Superseries will host the 1987 Memorial Cup. This series featured the top ranked team in the Leyden Division, the Oshawa Generals, take on the top ranked team in the Emms Division, the North Bay Centennials.

==== (L1) Oshawa Generals vs. (E1) North Bay Centennials ====
March 22	North Bay Centennials	2 – 5	Oshawa Generals	Oshawa Civic Auditorium

March 24	Oshawa Generals	2 – 5	North Bay Centennials	North Bay Memorial Gardens

March 26	North Bay Centennials	4 – 3	OT	Oshawa Generals	Oshawa Civic Auditorium

March 28	Oshawa Generals	7 – 2	North Bay Centennials	North Bay Memorial Gardens

March 30	North Bay Centennials	4 – 7	Oshawa Generals	Oshawa Civic Auditorium

March 31	Oshawa Generals	2 – 3	North Bay Centennials	North Bay Memorial Gardens

April 1	North Bay Centennials	0 – 3	Oshawa Generals	Oshawa Civic Auditorium

Oshawa wins series 4 – 3

=== Division quarter-finals ===
==== Leyden Division ====
===== (3) Ottawa 67's vs. (6) Cornwall Royals =====
March 22	Cornwall Royals	3 – 4	OT	Ottawa 67's	Ottawa Civic Centre

March 24	Ottawa 67's	1 – 3	Cornwall Royals	Cornwall Civic Complex

March 26	Ottawa 67's	5 – 3	Cornwall Royals	Cornwall Civic Complex

March 27	Cornwall Royals	2 – 3	Ottawa 67's	Ottawa Civic Centre

March 29	Cornwall Royals	2 – 4	Ottawa 67's	Ottawa Civic Centre

Ottawa wins series 4 – 1

===== (4) Kingston Canadians vs. (5) Belleville Bulls =====
March 22	Belleville Bulls	2 – 3	OT	Kingston Canadians	Kingston Memorial Centre

March 25	Kingston Canadians	0 – 5	Belleville Bulls	Yardmen Arena

March 27	Belleville Bulls	3 – 6	Kingston Canadians	Kingston Memorial Centre

March 28	Kingston Canadians	2 – 4	Belleville Bulls	Yardmen Arena

March 30	Belleville Bulls	2 – 3	Kingston Canadians	Kingston Memorial Centre

March 30	Kingston Canadians	4 – 2	Belleville Bulls	Yardmen Arena

Kingston wins series 4 – 2

==== Emms Division ====
===== (2) Hamilton Steelhawks vs. (6) Guelph Platers =====
March 23	Guelph Platers	3 – 5	Hamilton Steelhawks	Copps Coliseum

March 24	Hamilton Steelhawks	5 – 2	Guelph Platers	Guelph Memorial Gardens

March 26	Guelph Platers	7 – 3	Hamilton Steelhawks	Copps Coliseum

March 27	Hamilton Steelhawks	5 – 4	Guelph Platers	Guelph Memorial Gardens

March 28	Guelph Platers	2 – 4	Hamilton Steelhawks	Copps Coliseum

Hamilton wins series 4 – 1

===== (3) Windsor Compuware Spitfires vs. (5) Sault Ste. Marie Greyhounds =====
March 22	Sault Ste. Marie Greyhounds	2 – 5	Windsor Compuware Spitfires	Windsor Arena

March 24	Windsor Compuware Spitfires	4 – 2	Sault Ste. Marie Greyhounds	Sault Memorial Gardens

March 26	Sault Ste. Marie Greyhounds	2 – 3	Windsor Compuware Spitfires	Windsor Arena

March 28	Windsor Compuware Spitfires	5 – 4	OT	Sault Ste. Marie Greyhounds	Sault Memorial Gardens

Windsor wins series 4 – 0

=== Division semi-finals ===
==== Leyden Division ====
===== (1) Oshawa Generals vs. (4) Kingston Canadians =====
April 3	Oshawa Generals	1 – 4	Kingston Canadians	Kingston Memorial Centre

April 5	Kingston Canadians	4 – 3	OT	Oshawa Generals	Oshawa Civic Auditorium

April 7	Oshawa Generals	5 – 1	Kingston Canadians	Kingston Memorial Centre

April 8	Kingston Canadians	0 – 8	Oshawa Generals	Oshawa Civic Auditorium

April 10	Kingston Canadians	3 – 8	Oshawa Generals	Oshawa Civic Auditorium

April 11	Oshawa Generals	3 – 1	Kingston Canadians	Kingston Memorial Centre

Oshawa wins series 4 – 2

===== (2) Peterborough Petes vs. (3) Ottawa 67's =====
April 2	Ottawa 67's	4 – 5	Peterborough Petes	Peterborough Memorial Centre

April 3	Peterborough Petes	1 – 3	Ottawa 67's	Ottawa Civic Centre

April 5	Ottawa 67's	3 – 6	Peterborough Petes	Peterborough Memorial Centre

April 7	Peterborough Petes	2 – 5	Ottawa 67's	Ottawa Civic Centre

April 9	Ottawa 67's	2 – 5	Peterborough Petes	Peterborough Memorial Centre

April 10	Peterborough Petes	5 – 4	Ottawa 67's	Ottawa Civic Centre

Peterborough wins series 4 – 2

==== Emms Division ====
===== (1) North Bay Centennials vs. (4) Kitchener Rangers =====
April 4	Kitchener Rangers	3 – 5	North Bay Centennials	North Bay Memorial Gardens

April 6	Kitchener Rangers	3 – 4	North Bay Centennials	North Bay Memorial Gardens

April 8	North Bay Centennials	4 – 2	Kitchener Rangers	Kitchener Memorial Auditorium

April 9	North Bay Centennials	6 – 5	OT	Kitchener Rangers	Kitchener Memorial Auditorium

North Bay wins series 4 – 0

===== (2) Hamilton Steelhawks vs. (3) Windsor Spitfires =====
April 3	Windsor Spitfires	4 – 2	Hamilton Steelhawks	Copps Coliseum

April 5	Hamilton Steelhawks	4 – 6	Windsor Spitfires	Windsor Arena

April 7	Windsor Spitfires	4 – 3	OT	Hamilton Steelhawks	Copps Coliseum

April 8	Hamilton Steelhawks	1 – 4	Windsor Spitfires	Windsor Arena

Windsor wins series 4 – 0

=== Division finals ===
==== Leyden Division ====
===== (1) Oshawa Generals vs. (2) Peterborough Petes =====
April 14	Peterborough Petes	1 – 0	OT	Oshawa Generals	Oshawa Civic Auditorium

April 16	Oshawa Generals	5 – 2	Peterborough Petes	Peterborough Memorial Centre

April 17	Peterborough Petes	3 – 0	Oshawa Generals	Oshawa Civic Auditorium

April 19	Oshawa Generals	4 – 2	Peterborough Petes	Peterborough Memorial Centre

April 20	Peterborough Petes	2 – 4	Oshawa Generals	Oshawa Civic Auditorium

April 22	Oshawa Generals	4 – 3	OT	Peterborough Petes	Peterborough Memorial Centre

Oshawa wins series 4 – 2

==== Emms Division ====
===== (1) North Bay Centennials vs. (3) Windsor Compuware Spitfires =====
April 13	Windsor Compuware Spitfires	2 – 3	OT	North Bay Centennials	North Bay Memorial Gardens

April 14	Windsor Compuware Spitfires	4 – 6	North Bay Centennials	North Bay Memorial Gardens

April 16	North Bay Centennials	3 – 6	Windsor Compuware Spitfires	Windsor Arena

April 17	North Bay Centennials	4 – 5	Windsor Compuware Spitfires	Windsor Arena

April 19	Windsor Compuware Spitfires	4 – 6	North Bay Centennials	North Bay Memorial Gardens

April 21	North Bay Centennials	5 – 4	OT	Windsor Compuware Spitfires	Windsor Arena

North Bay wins series 4 – 2

=== J. Ross Robertson Cup ===
==== (L1) Oshawa Generals vs. (E1) North Bay Centennials ====
April 26	Oshawa Generals	3 – 7	North Bay Centennials	North Bay Memorial Gardens

April 28	North Bay Centennials	2 – 4	Oshawa Generals	Oshawa Civic Auditorium

April 29	North Bay Centennials	1 – 4	Oshawa Generals	Oshawa Civic Auditorium

May 1	Oshawa Generals	3 – 5	North Bay Centennials	North Bay Memorial Gardens

May 3	North Bay Centennials	2 – 7	Oshawa Generals	Oshawa Civic Auditorium

May 4	Oshawa Generals	3 – 5	North Bay Centennials	North Bay Memorial Gardens

May 6	North Bay Centennials	3 – 5	Oshawa Generals	Oshawa Civic Auditorium

Oshawa wins series 4 – 3

== Awards ==
J. Ross Robertson Cup:	Oshawa Generals
Hamilton Spectator Trophy:	Oshawa Generals
Leyden Trophy:	Oshawa Generals
Emms Trophy:	North Bay Centennials
Red Tilson Trophy:	Scott McCrory, Oshawa Generals
Eddie Powers Memorial Trophy:	Scott McCrory, Oshawa Generals
Matt Leyden Trophy:	Paul Theriault, Oshawa Generals
Jim Mahon Memorial Trophy:	Ron Goodall, Kitchener Rangers
Max Kaminsky Trophy:	Kerry Huffman, Guelph Platers
Jack Ferguson Award:	John Uniac, Sudbury Wolves
Dave Pinkney Trophy:	Jeff Hackett and Sean Evoy, Oshawa Generals
Emms Family Award:	Andrew Cassels, Ottawa 67's
F.W. 'Dinty' Moore Trophy:	Jeff Hackett, Oshawa Generals
William Hanley Trophy:	Scott McCrory, Oshawa Generals and Keith Gretzky, Hamilton Steelhawks
Leo Lalonde Memorial Trophy:	Mike Richard, Toronto Marlboros
Bobby Smith Trophy:	John McIntyre, Guelph Platers

== 1987 OHL Priority Selection ==
The Sudbury Wolves held the first overall pick in the 1987 Ontario Priority Selection and selected John Uniac from the Stratford Cullitons. Uniac was awarded the Jack Ferguson Award, awarded to the top pick in the draft.

Below are the players who were selected in the first round of the 1987 Ontario Hockey League Priority Selection.

#	Player	Nationality	OHL Team	Hometown	Minor Team
1	John Uniac (D)	Canada	Sudbury Wolves	Stratford, Ontario	Stratford Cullitons
2	Jason Winch (LW)	Canada	Toronto Marlboros	St. Catharines, Ontario	St. Catharines Falcons
3	Rick Corriveau (D)	Canada	London Knights	Welland, Ontario	Welland Cougars
4	Derek Booth (D)	Canada	Cornwall Royals	Niagara Falls, Ontario	Owen Sound Greys
5	Scott Thornton (C)	Canada	Belleville Bulls	London, Ontario	London Diamonds
6	Steve Widmeyer (RW)	Canada	Kingston Canadians	Bedford, Nova Scotia	Dartmouth Midgets
7	Mike Speer (D)	Canada	Guelph Platers	Toronto, Ontario	Toronto Marlboros Midget
8	Shane Sargant (LW)	Canada	Sault Ste. Marie Greyhounds	Collingwood, Ontario	Barrie Colts
9	Cory Keenan (D)	Canada	Kitchener Rangers	North Bay, Ontario	St. Mary's Lincolns
10	Joey St. Aubin (C)	Canada	Ottawa 67's	Oshawa, Ontario	Oshawa Midgets
11	Joe Hawley (RW)	Canada	Peterborough Petes	Peterborough, Ontario	Peterborough Midgets
12	Jamie Allan (RW)	Canada	Windsor Compuware Spitfires	Brockville, Ontario	Brockville Braves
13	Jason York (D)	Canada	Hamilton Steelhawks	Nepean, Ontario	Smiths Falls Bears
14	Mark Major (LW)	Canada	North Bay Centennials	Toronto, Ontario	Don Mills Flyers
15	Jarrod Skalde (C)	Canada	Oshawa Generals	Niagara Falls, Ontario	Fort Erie Meteors

== See also ==
- List of OHA Junior A standings
- List of OHL seasons
- 1987 Memorial Cup
- 1987 NHL entry draft
- 1986 in sports
- 1987 in sports

Preceded by 1985–86 OHL season	OHL seasons	Succeeded by 1987–88 OHL season
