= 1987–88 AHL season =

- League: American Hockey League
- Sport: Ice hockey

Regular season
- F. G. "Teddy" Oke Trophy: Maine Mariners
- Season MVP: Jody Gage
- Top scorer: Bruce Boudreau
- MVP: Wendell Young

Playoffs
- Champions: Hershey Bears
- Runners-up: Fredericton Express

AHL seasons
- 1986–87 1988–89

The 1987–88 AHL season was the 52nd season of the American Hockey League. Fourteen teams played 80 games each in the schedule. The league abandoned shootout, but continues to award points for an overtime loss. The Hershey Bears finished first overall in the regular season, and won their seventh Calder Cup championship.

== Team changes ==
- The original Maine Mariners become the Utica Devils based in Utica, New York, playing in the South Division.
- A new Maine Mariners join the AHL as an expansion team.
- The Moncton Golden Flames become the Moncton Hawks.
- The New Haven Nighthawks & Springfield Indians switch divisions from South to North.
- The Adirondack Red Wings switch divisions from North to South.

== Final standings ==
- y– indicates team clinched division and a playoff spot
- x– indicates team clinched a playoff spot
- e– indicates team was eliminated from playoff contention

North Division	GP	W	L	T	OTL	Pts	GF	GA
y–Maine Mariners (BOS)	80	44	25	7	4	99	308	284
x–Fredericton Express (QUE/VAN)	80	42	27	8	3	95	370	318
x–Sherbrooke Canadiens (MTL)	80	42	33	4	1	89	316	243
x–Nova Scotia Oilers (EDM)	80	35	34	9	2	81	323	343
e–New Haven Nighthawks (LAK/NYR)	80	33	37	7	3	76	288	307
e–Moncton Hawks (WIN)	80	27	43	8	2	64	286	358
e–Springfield Indians (NYI)	80	27	44	8	1	63	269	333

South Division	GP	W	L	T	OTL	Pts	GF	GA
y–Hershey Bears (PHI)	80	50	25	3	2	105	343	256
x–Rochester Americans (BUF)	80	46	26	7	1	100	328	272
x–Adirondack Red Wings (DET)	80	42	23	11	4	99	306	275
x–Binghamton Whalers (HFD/WSH)	80	38	31	8	3	87	353	300
e–Utica Devils (NJD)	80	34	33	11	2	81	318	307
e–Newmarket Saints (TOR)	80	33	33	8	6	80	282	328
e–Baltimore Skipjacks (independent)	80	13	58	9	0	35	268	434

== Scoring leaders ==
Note: GP = Games played; G = Goals; A = Assists; Pts = Points; PIM = Penalty minutes

Player	Team	GP	G	A	Pts	PIM
Bruce Boudreau	Springfield Indians	80	42	74	116	84
Jean-Marc Lanthier	Fredericton Express	74	35	71	106	37
Jody Gage	Rochester Americans	76	60	44	104	46
Alfie Turcotte	Sherbrooke / Baltimore / Moncton	66	36	66	102	64
Gilles Thibaudeau	Sherbrooke Canadiens	59	39	57	96	45
Mike Richard	Binghamton Whalers	72	46	48	94	23
Murray Eaves	Adirondack Red Wings	65	39	54	93	65
Tim Lenardon	Utica Devils	79	38	53	91	72
Marty Dallman	Newmarket Saints	76	50	39	89	52
Tom Martin	Binghamton Whalers	71	28	61	89	344

- complete list

== Calder Cup playoffs ==
Division Semifinals
1	Maine	4
4	Nova Scotia	1
North Division
2	Fredericton	4
3	Sherbrooke	2
1	Hershey	4
4	Binghamton	0
South Division
2	Rochester	3
3	Adirondack	4

Division Finals
1	Maine	1
2	Fredericton	4
1	Hershey	4
3	Adirondack	0

Calder Cup Final
N2	Fredericton	0
S1	Hershey	4

== Trophy and award winners ==
Team awards

Calder Cup; Playoff champions:	Hershey Bears
F. G. "Teddy" Oke Trophy; Regular Season champions, North Division:	Maine Mariners
John D. Chick Trophy; Regular Season champions, South Division:	Hershey Bears

Individual awards

Les Cunningham Award; Most valuable player:	Jody Gage - Rochester Americans
John B. Sollenberger Trophy; Top point scorer:	Bruce Boudreau - Springfield Indians
Dudley "Red" Garrett Memorial Award; Rookie of the year:	Mike Richard - Binghamton Whalers
Eddie Shore Award; Defenceman of the year:	David Fenyves - Hershey Bears
Aldege "Baz" Bastien Memorial Award; Best Goaltender:	Wendell Young - Hershey Bears
Harry "Hap" Holmes Memorial Award; Lowest goals against average:	Vincent Riendeau & Jocelyn Perreault - Sherbrooke Canadiens
Louis A.R. Pieri Memorial Award; Coach of the year:	John Paddock - Hershey Bears & Mike Milbury - Maine Mariners
Fred T. Hunt Memorial Award; Sportsmanship / Perseverance:	Bruce Boudreau - Springfield Indians
Jack A. Butterfield Trophy; MVP of the playoffs:	Wendell Young - Hershey Bears

Other awards

James C. Hendy Memorial Award; Most outstanding executive:	Tom Mitchell
James H. Ellery Memorial Awards; Outstanding media coverage:	Mike Kane, Adirondack, (newspaper); Jeff Rimer, Baltimore, (radio); Frank Chiano, Rochester, (television)
Ken McKenzie Award; Outstanding marketing executive:	Doug Yingst, Hershey Bears

== See also ==
- List of AHL seasons

Preceded by 1986–87 AHL season	AHL seasons	Succeeded by 1988–89 AHL season
