= Windsor Arena =

Indoor arena in Windsor, Ontario

- The Barn; Madhouse on McDougall
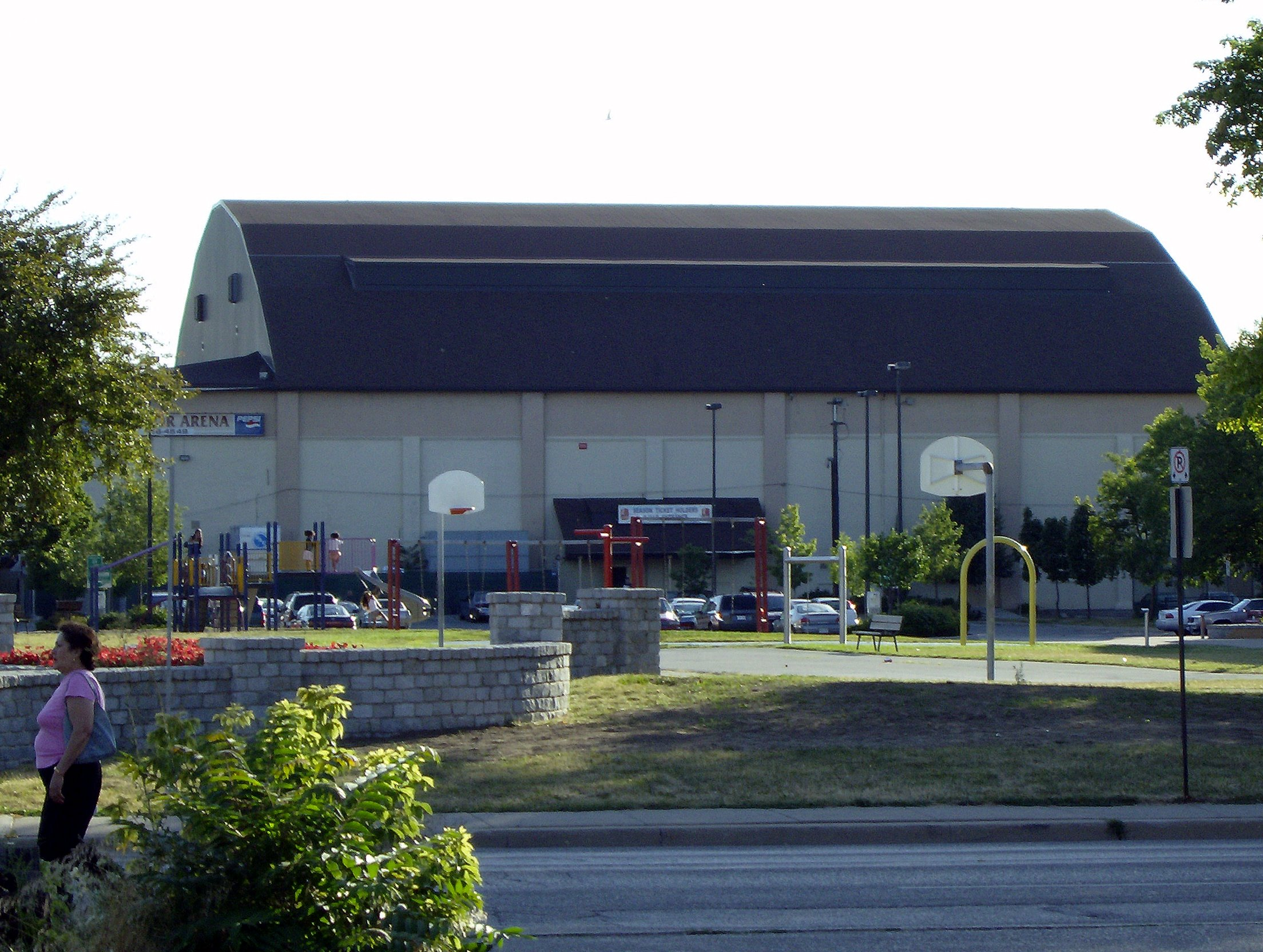
- Interactive map of Windsor Arena
- Former names: Border Cities Arena
- Location: 334 Wyandotte Street East, Windsor, Ontario
- Coordinates: 42°18′58″N 83°1′56″W
- Owner: City of Windsor
- Capacity: Ice hockey: 4,400; Concerts: 6,264

Construction
- Opened: 1924
- Closed: 2013

Tenants
- Windsor Minor Hockey Association (1924–2013); Detroit Cougars (NHL) (1926–1927); Windsor Bulldogs (OHA Senior A/IHL) (1953–1965); Windsor Spitfires (OHL) (1975–2008); Windsor Lancers (OUA) (2008–2013)

Windsor Arena (nicknamed The Barn) is an indoor arena located in Windsor, Ontario. Its capacity is approximately 4,400 with standing room. The arena's ice is 80 feet (24 m) by 195 feet (59 m) or 15,600 square feet (1,450 m^{2}). The arena was the home of the Windsor Spitfires of the Ontario Hockey League from 1975 to 2008, at which time the team's home was moved to the WFCU Centre.

== History ==
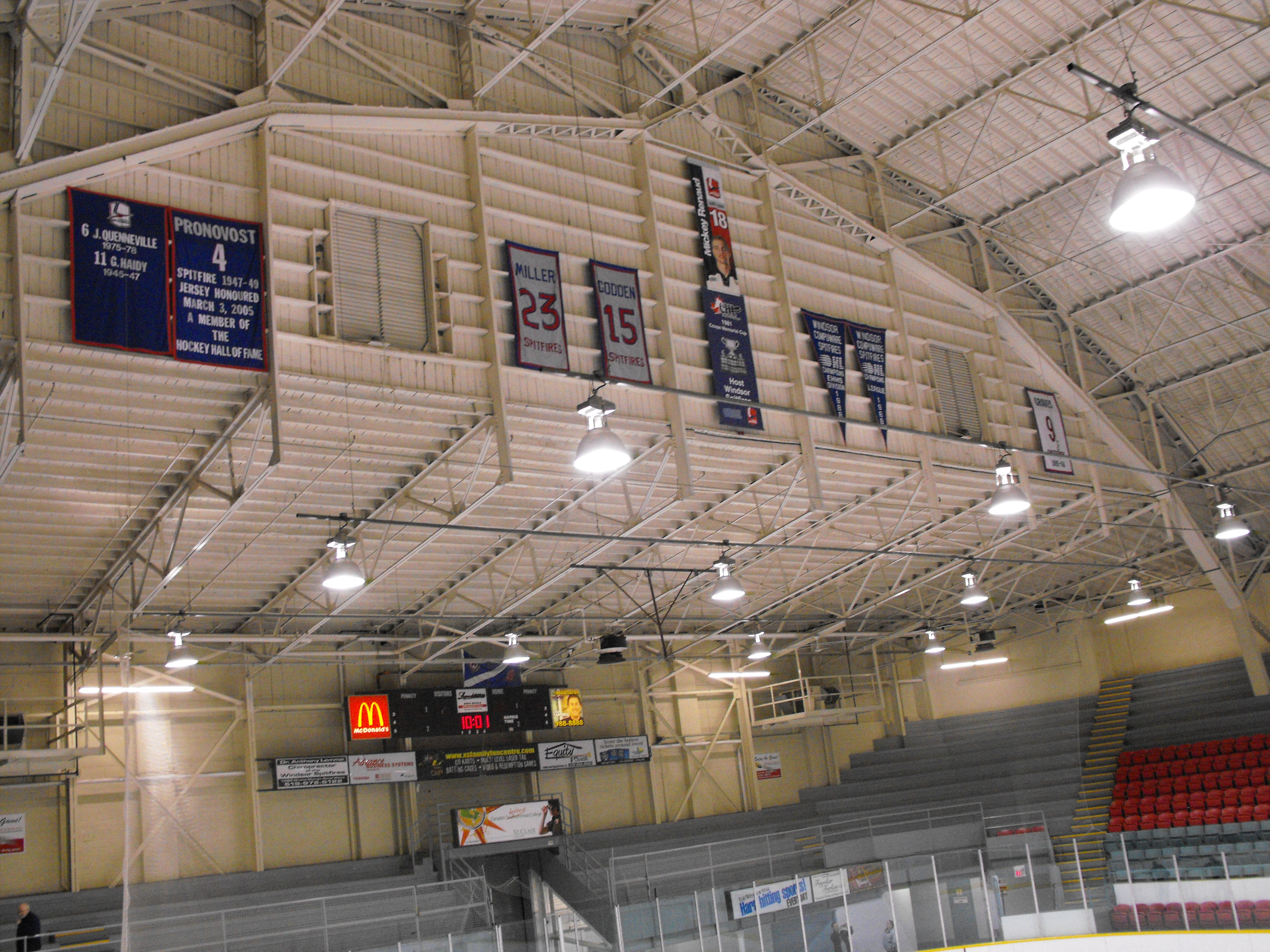
Spitfires old banners (in 2012) still hanging in The Barn. Includes Mickey Renaud, 1988 OHL Championship banner, Adam Graves, etc.

Originally named the Border Cities Arena, it hosted the Detroit Cougars (later renamed the Detroit Red Wings) for the 1926-1927 NHL season, while the Olympia Stadium was under construction. The Border Cities Arena, built in 1925 for the local junior hockey team, was expanded from 6,000 to 9,000 for the Cougars. The arena was later renamed the Windsor Arena.

Having been constructed in 1924, the arena is among the oldest of its type in North America.

In 2006, the WFCU Centre, located in the city's east side off Lauzon Road, was approved by the Windsor city council. The decision to replace the arena is attributed to complaints about Windsor Arena's seating and tiny concourses.

The Spitfires' final game at the Windsor Arena was played on December 4, 2008. Windsor beat the Guelph Storm 2-1, giving the Spitfires a perfect 12-0 record at The Barn for the 2008-09 season.

From 2009 until 2013, the University of Windsor Lancers hockey teams took over as the major tenants of the arena. Also, the Windsor Minor Hockey Association used this arena for games until 2013.

In February 2014, the arena was used as a site for salt storage. In April 2014, Catholic Central High School proposed a plan to construct a new school on the site, with the full demolition of Windsor Arena being part of the plan without any emphasis. The City of Windsor approved the plan to build the new Catholic Central High School on the site, but the plans never came to fruition and the school was constructed elsewhere.

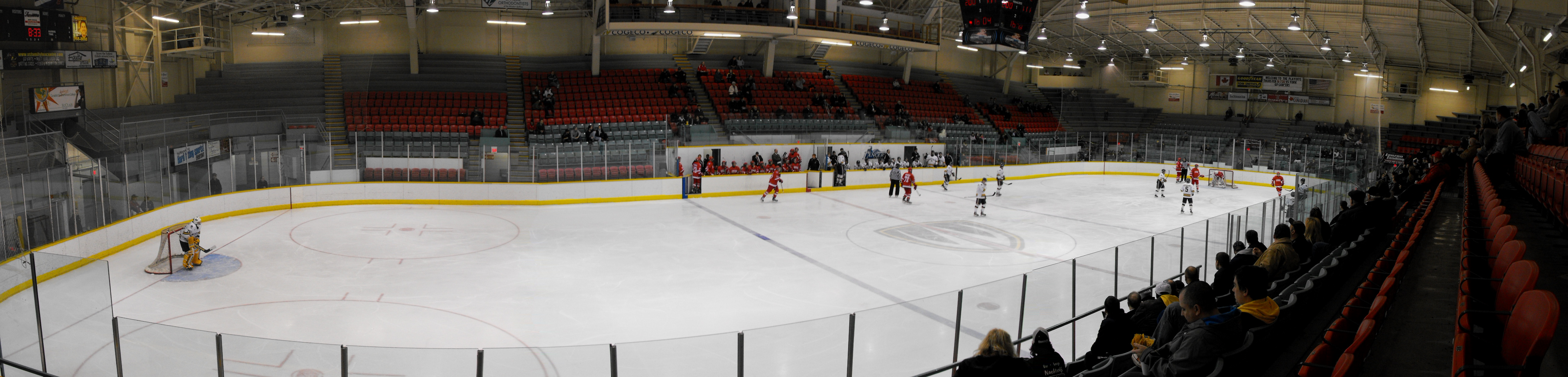
Panoramic view inside arena during Windsor Lancers men's hockey team playoff game, February 16, 2012. (click to enlarge)

Preceded by first arena	Home of the Detroit Cougars; 1926–1927	Succeeded by Olympia Stadium
Preceded by first arena	Home of the Windsor Spitfires; 1975–2008	Succeeded by WFCU Centre
