= 1946–47 IHL season =

North American ice hockey season

The 1946–47 IHL season was the second season of the International Hockey League, a North American minor professional league. Five teams participated in the regular season, and the Windsor Spitfires won the Turner Cup.

== Regular season ==
	GP	W	L	T	GF	GA	Pts
Windsor Staffords	28	17	8	3	167	138	37
Detroit Bright's Goodyears	28	13	9	6	154	128	32
Windsor Spitfires	28	14	10	4	162	141	32
Detroit Metal Mouldings	28	9	13	6	89	122	24
Detroit Auto Club	28	7	20	1	113	156	15

== Turner Cup-Playoffs ==
Turner-Cup-Semifinals
1	Windsor Staffords	0
2	Detroit Bright's Goodyears	2
3	Windsor Spitfires	2
4	Detroit Metal Mouldings	1

Turner-Cup-Final
2	Detroit Bright's Goodyears	0
3	Windsor Spitfires	3
