= Detroit Metal Mouldings =

Minor league professional ice hockey team

The Detroit Metal Mouldings were a minor league professional ice hockey team, and member of the International Hockey League. The team joined the league in its second season, and played three seasons. The team was known as Detroit Jerry Lynch for the 1948–1949 season.

== Standings ==
Season	Team	GP	W	L	T	PTS	GF	GA	Pct	Standing	Playoffs
1946–1947	Metal Mouldings	28	9	13	6	24	89	122	0.429	4 of 5	Lost Semifinals Windsor Spitfires 2-1
1947–1948	Metal Mouldings	30	15	12	3	33	135	139	0.550	3 of 6	Lost Semifinals Windsor Hettche 2-1
1948–1949	Jerry Lynch	31	16	6	9	44	163	125	0.710	4 of 11	Lost Quarterfinals Windsor Hettche 2-0
Totals		89	40	31	18	101	387	386	0.567		
