= 1947–48 IHL season =

North American ice hockey season

The 1947–48 IHL season was the third season of the International Hockey League, a North American minor professional league. Six teams participated in the regular season, and the Toledo Mercurys won the Turner Cup.

== Regular season ==
	GP	W	L	T	GF	GA	Pts
Windsor Hettche Spitfires	30	19	10	1	151	105	39
Toledo Mercurys	30	15	10	5	113	98	35
Detroit Metal Mouldings	30	15	12	3	135	139	33
Detroit Bright's Goodyears	30	13	14	3	157	149	29
Detroit Auto Club	30	13	16	1	161	155	27
Windsor Staffords	30	8	21	1	117	188	17

== Turner Cup-Playoffs ==
Turner-Cup-Semifinals
1	Windsor Hettche Spitfires	2
3	Detroit Metal Mouldings	1
2	Toledo Mercurys	2
4	Detroit Bright's Goodyears	0

Turner-Cup-Final
1	Windsor Hettche Spitfires	1
2	Toledo Mercurys	4
