= Omaha Knights (AHA) =

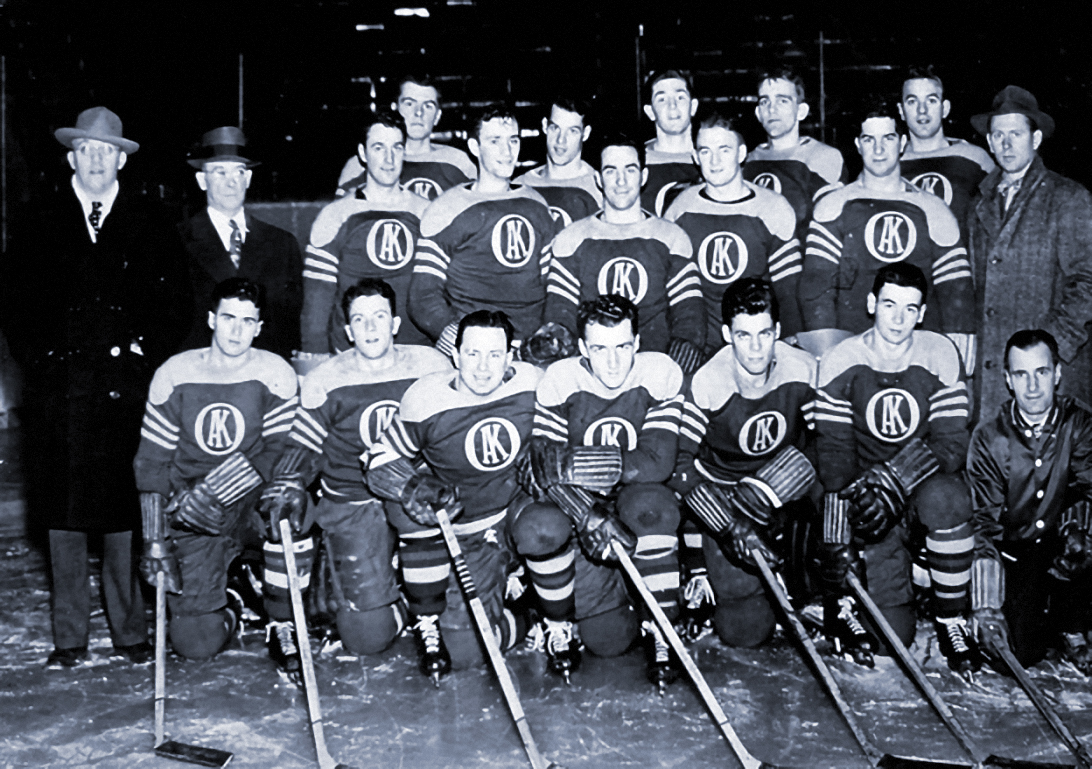
The 1945-46 Omaha Knights with Gordie Howe (2nd from left, back row)

The Omaha Knights were a minor league professional ice hockey team that played in Omaha, Nebraska. The Knights were members of the American Hockey Association from 1939 to 1942, until the team went on hiatus during World War II. The Knights returned to the ice, playing in the United States Hockey League from 1945 to 1951. At least two former players are in the Hockey Hall of Fame. Gordie Howe played for the Knights from 1945–1946 and Terry Sawchuk played from 1947–1948.
