= 1945–46 NHL transactions =

The following is a list of all team-to-team transactions that have occurred in the National Hockey League (NHL) during the 1945–46 NHL season. It lists which team each player has been traded to and for which player(s) or other consideration(s), if applicable.

== Transactions ==
July 9, 1945	To Toronto Maple Leafs cash future considerations	To Chicago Black Hawks Reg Hamilton
September 11, 1945	To Montreal Canadiens Billy Reay	To Detroit Red Wings Ray Getliffe^{1} Felix Rossignol
October, 1945 exact date unknown	To Boston Bruins cash	To Chicago Black Hawks Joe Cooper
October 14, 1945	To Montreal Canadiens Vic Lynn	To Detroit Red Wings cash
December 26, 1945	To Detroit Red Wings George Blake; Doug McCaig cash	To Chicago Black Hawks Jerome McAtee; Norm McAtee; George Ritchie; Roy Sawyer
February 5, 1946	To Boston Bruins Norm McAtee	To Chicago Black Hawks Bill Jennings
April 1, 1946	To Detroit Red Wings cash	To Chicago Black Hawks Rollie McLenahan

Notes

1. Getliffe replaced by Fern Gauthier on October 18, 1945 after Getliffe retired.
