= Ken Reardon =

Canadian ice hockey player (1921–2008)

- Hockey Hall of Fame, 1966
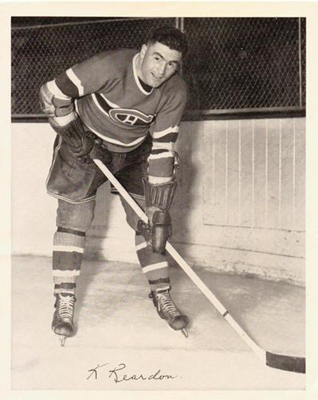
- Born: April 1, 1921 Winnipeg, Manitoba, Canada
- Died: March 15, 2008 (aged 86) Saint-Sauveur, Quebec, Canada
- Height: 5 ft 11 in (180 cm)
- Weight: 180 lb (82 kg; 12 st 12 lb)
- Position: Defence
- Shot: Left
- Played for: Montreal Canadiens
- Playing career: 1940–1950

Kenneth Joseph Reardon (April 1, 1921 – March 15, 2008) was a Canadian professional ice hockey defenceman who played for the Montreal Canadiens in the National Hockey League. He was inducted into the Hockey Hall of Fame in 1966. Ken is the younger brother of Terry Reardon.

== Biography ==
Reardon was born April 1, 1921, in Winnipeg, Manitoba. He was known as a tough defenceman, a physical player who exhibited great endurance by continuing to play while injured. He played two seasons with Montreal before enlisting in the Canadian Army in 1942. He spent several years playing for army teams in the Ottawa area, winning the Allan Cup with the Commandos in 1943 before he was shipped overseas. During World War II, Reardon returned to the Canadiens and won the Stanley Cup in 1946. Reardon faced his brother Terry in that series, making them one of the few sets of brothers to do so in the Stanley Cup Finals, and the two even dropped gloves against each other at one point.

== After hockey ==
Reardon retired prior to turning 30, a probable result of the numerous injuries he sustained. He continued his hockey career off-ice, scouting for and managing farm teams before becoming a successful executive in hockey with the Canadiens. He was announced as coach of the Kitchener Greenshirts in March 1954. The position came after working as chief of staff of the Cincinnati Mohawks. He earned the position as the Canadiens vice-president in 1956. During his tenure with Montreal the team won five Stanley Cup titles. He was inducted into the Hall of Fame in 1966. He died on March 15, 2008, at the age of 86.

== Awards and achievements ==
- Allan Cup championship (1943)
- Stanley Cup championship — 1946 (as a player), 1956 (as an assistant manager), 1957, 1958, 1959, 1960 (as the Vice President)
- NHL First All-Star Team defence (1947 and 1950)
- NHL Second All-Star Team defence (1946, 1948, and 1949)
- Inducted into the Hockey Hall of Fame in 1966
- Inducted into the Manitoba Sports Hall of Fame and Museum in 1996
- Selected to Manitoba's All-Century Second All-Star Team
- Honoured Member of the Manitoba Hockey Hall of Fame.

== Career statistics ==
| | | | Regular season | | | | | Playoffs |
| Season | Team | League | GP | G | A | Pts | PIM | GP | G | A | Pts | PIM |
|---|---|---|---|---|---|---|---|---|---|---|---|---|
| 1937–38 | Blue River Rebels | BCJHL | — | — | — | — | — | — | — | — | — | — |
| 1938–39 | Edmonton Athletic Club | EJrHL | 9 | 0 | 1 | 1 | 15 | 2 | 0 | 2 | 2 | — |
| 1938–39 | Edmonton Athletic Club | M-Cup | — | — | — | — | — | 2 | 0 | 1 | 1 | 0 |
| 1939–40 | Edmonton Athletic Club | EJrHL | 10 | — | — | — | 42 | 4 | 0 | 2 | 2 | 8 |
| 1939–40 | Edmonton Athletic Club | M-Cup | — | — | — | — | — | 14 | 18 | 13 | 31 | 46 |
| 1940–41 | Montreal Canadiens | NHL | 34 | 2 | 8 | 10 | 41 | 3 | 0 | 0 | 0 | 4 |
| 1941–42 | Montreal Canadiens | NHL | 41 | 3 | 12 | 15 | 93 | 3 | 0 | 0 | 0 | 4 |
| 1942–43 | Ottawa Commandos | OCHL | 26 | 7 | 16 | 23 | 77 | 23 | 3 | 9 | 12 | 47 |
| 1942–43 | Ottawa Army | OCHL | 10 | 10 | 7 | 17 | 15 | — | — | — | — | — |
| 1943–44 | Ottawa Commandos | OCHL | 1 | 1 | 0 | 1 | 0 | — | — | — | — | — |
| 1945–46 | Montreal Canadiens | NHL | 43 | 5 | 4 | 9 | 45 | 9 | 1 | 1 | 2 | 4 |
| 1945–46 | Montreal Royals | QSHL | 2 | 0 | 0 | 0 | 4 | — | — | — | — | — |
| 1946–47 | Montreal Canadiens | NHL | 52 | 5 | 17 | 22 | 84 | 7 | 1 | 2 | 3 | 20 |
| 1947–48 | Montreal Canadiens | NHL | 58 | 7 | 15 | 22 | 129 | — | — | — | — | — |
| 1948–49 | Montreal Canadiens | NHL | 46 | 3 | 13 | 16 | 103 | 7 | 0 | 0 | 0 | 18 |
| 1949–50 | Montreal Canadiens | NHL | 67 | 1 | 27 | 28 | 109 | 2 | 0 | 2 | 2 | 12 |
| NHL totals | | | 341 | 26 | 96 | 122 | 604 | 31 | 2 | 5 | 7 | 62 |

== See also ==
- Notable families in the NHL
