= Don Poile =

Canadian ice hockey player (1932–2024)

- Born: June 1, 1932 Fort William, Ontario, Canada
- Died: February 23, 2024 (aged 91) Edmonton, Alberta, Canada
- Height: 5 ft 11 in (180 cm)
- Weight: 165 lb (75 kg; 11 st 11 lb)
- Position: Centre
- Shot: Left
- Played for: Detroit Red Wings
- Playing career: 1952–1962

Donald Bruce Poile (June 1, 1932 – February 23, 2024) was a Canadian professional ice hockey player who played 67 games in the National Hockey League (NHL) with the Detroit Red Wings between 1954 and 1958. The rest of his career, which lasted from 1952 to 1962, was mainly spent with the Edmonton Flyers of the Western Hockey League (WHL). He was born in Fort William, Ontario, and was the brother of Hall of Famer Bud Poile and uncle of longtime NHL executive David Poile.

Don Poile died on February 23, 2024, at the age of 91.

== Career statistics ==
=== Regular season and playoffs ===
			Regular season					Playoffs
Season	Team	League	GP	G	A	Pts	PIM	GP	G	A	Pts	PIM
1949–50	Fort William Hurricanes	TBJHL	12	8	2	10	8	5	1	0	1	4
1950–51	Fort William Hurricanes	TBJHL	21	2	7	9	14	12	7	7	14	12
1951–52	Fort William Hurricanes	TBJHL	30	30	36	66	46	9	9	10	19	12
1951–52	Fort William Hurricanes	M-Cup	—	—	—	—	—	12	4	8	12	17
1952–53	Milwaukee Chiefs	IHL	56	42	34	76	14	—	—	—	—	—
1952–53	Edmonton Flyers	WHL	—	—	—	—	—	2	0	0	0	0
1953–54	Edmonton Flyers	WHL	70	26	33	59	16	13	2	2	4	8
1954–55	Edmonton Flyers	WHL	52	16	29	45	21	9	5	1	6	0
1954–55	Detroit Red Wings	NHL	4	0	0	0	0	—	—	—	—	—
1955–56	Edmonton Flyers	WHL	70	22	29	51	63	3	2	0	2	2
1956–57	Edmonton Flyers	WHL	69	31	25	56	54	8	3	2	5	14
1957–58	Edmonton Flyers	WHL	2	1	3	4	0	—	—	—	—	—
1957–58	Detroit Red Wings	NHL	63	7	9	16	12	4	0	0	0	0
1958–59	Hershey Bears	AHL	4	0	0	0	0	—	—	—	—	—
1958–59	Edmonton Flyers	WHL	51	18	29	47	19	3	1	0	1	4
1959–60	Edmonton Flyers	WHL	70	20	34	54	28	4	0	1	1	12
1960–61	Edmonton Flyers	WHL	60	22	21	43	21	—	—	—	—	—
1961–62	Edmonton Flyers	WHL	63	23	27	50	20	12	7	7	14	2
NHL totals			67	7	9	16	12	4	0	0	0	0
