= Eddolls =

Eddolls is a surname. Notable people with the surname include:

- Frank Eddolls (1921–1961), Canadian ice hockey player
- Jonathan Eddolls (born 1981), British Formula One engineer
