= Ed Bruneteau =

Canadian ice hockey player

- Born: August 1, 1919 St. Boniface, Manitoba, Canada
- Died: July 30, 2002 (aged 82) Omaha, Nebraska, U.S.
- Height: 5 ft 8 in (173 cm)
- Weight: 175 lb (79 kg; 12 st 7 lb)
- Position: Right wing
- Shot: Right
- Played for: Detroit Red Wings
- Playing career: 1937–1954

Edward Ernest H. Bruneteau (August 1, 1919 — July 30, 2002) was a Canadian ice hockey right winger. Bruneteau played 181 games with the Detroit Red Wings of the National Hockey League over seven seasons between 1941 and 1948. He also coached the Omaha Lancers of the United States Hockey League for 21 games in the 1986–87 season leading the team to a 0–21 record. Ed is the younger brother of "Mud" Bruneteau, famous for ending the longest overtime game in NHL history.

== Professional career ==
=== Minor league hockey ===
Brunetau was born in St. Boniface, Manitoba. He played junior hockey with the Winnipeg Rangers of the MJHL and the Duluth Zephyrs of the TBSHL. He showed promise as a scorer and his rights were traded to the Detroit Red Wings on October 2, 1939, for cash. Detroit allowed Bruneteau to remain in the minors, as a member of the American Hockey Association's Omaha Knights, who were formed after the Zephyrs home rink roof collapsed during a heavy snowstorm in the winter of 1939. He went on to score 28 points in 37 games that season and along with chipping in two goals during a short playoff run.

=== Playing for the Red Wings ===
The following season saw Bruneteau starting again with the Knights, being transferred for a short time to the Indianapolis Capitals of the American Hockey League, and then heading into the big leagues by starting in 11 games for the Red Wings. He rejoined his older brother, Mud, who had joined the team the preceding season. Bruneteau finished the season with a goal and an assist and played in Detroit's first three playoff games before being let go.

=== Back in the minors ===
Bruneteau was signed as a free agent by the Quebec Aces of the Quebec Senior Hockey League on November 13, 1941, and began play on the top line for the 1941–42 season. He scored 28 points in the 38 games of the regular season and the Allan Cup championship. Bruneteau also scored four goals and an assist in the Aces' playoff run. The following season, Bruneteau worked on increasing his speed and it showed. Bruneteau ended the 1942–43 season with 37 points in the 31-game regular season and 23 points in the 9-game Allan Cup Championship. In 1943–44, He scored 41 points in just 25 games and helped the Aces win the Allan Cup by adding another 26 points in their 15 playoff games.

=== Playing for the Red Wings, take two ===
Bruneteau had made himself valuable again and the Quebec Aces traded him back to the Detroit Red Wings for Bob Thorpe on November 16, 1944. This time Bruneteau made himself a staple on the big team and played three full seasons for Detroit. He often formed a solid line with Carl Liscombe and Murray Armstrong and ended with 77 points over a three-year span. After the 1946–47 season, Bruneteau began spending less time in Detroit a more time in the minors. In 1948–49, Bruneteau played his last NHL game, but remained a scoring threat playing for Indianapolis. He knocked in 38 points in 61 games before being moved to rejoin with the Omaha Knights, now of the USHL. He again was reunited with his older brother who was head coach of the Knights. Under his brother's leadership, Bruneteau would score 149 points for Omaha in the two following seasons, including leading the team in scoring in 1949–50 and being named to the USHL Second All-Star Team both years. For the 1951–52 season, Bruneteau would be back with the Indianapolis Capitals, scoring 41 points in 56 games. Detroit released Bruneteau after that season and he found his way to the Milwaukee Clarks of the International Hockey League where he again went on a scoring frenzy, putting up 51 points and being named to the IHL Second All-Star Team. Bruneteau felt he had one more good season in him and spent it playing with the Sherbrooke Saints of the Quebec Hockey League. After scoring 49 points that year, Bruneteau retired from playing ice hockey. He died in Omaha, Nebraska in 2002.

== Career statistics ==
=== Regular season and playoffs ===
			Regular season					Playoffs
Season	Team	League	GP	G	A	Pts	PIM	GP	G	A	Pts	PIM
1936–37	Winnipeg Rangers	MJHL	16	17	6	23	6	1	1	0	1	5
1937–38	Duluth Zephyrs	IASHL	27	26	11	37	10	—	—	—	—	—
1938–39	Duluth Zephyrs	TBSHL	10	7	1	8	8	—	—	—	—	—
1938–39	Duluth Zephyrs	TBSHL	12	8	2	10	12	—	—	—	—	—
1939–40	Omaha Knights	AHA	37	13	15	28	16	9	2	0	2	0
1940–41	Detroit Red Wings	NHL	11	1	1	2	2	3	0	0	0	0
1940–41	Omaha Knights	AHA	18	3	2	5	6	—	—	—	—	—
1940–41	Indianapolis Capitals	AHL	13	3	4	7	6	—	—	—	—	—
1941–42	Quebec Aces	QSHL	30	10	5	15	17	7	4	1	5	0
1941–42	Quebec Aces	Al-Cup	—	—	—	—	—	8	8	5	13	0
1942–43	Quebec Morton Aces	QSHL	31	20	17	37	0	9	9	14	23	4
1942–43	Quebec Morton Aces	Al-Cup	—	—	—	—	—	9	9	14	23	4
1943–44	Detroit Red Wings	NHL	2	0	1	1	0	—	—	—	—	—
1943–44	Quebec Aces	QSHL	25	14	27	41	6	15	10	16	26	4
1944–45	Detroit Red Wings	NHL	42	12	13	25	6	14	5	2	7	0
1944–45	Quebec Aces	QSHL	2	1	4	5	0	—	—	—	—	—
1945–46	Detroit Red Wings	NHL	46	17	12	29	11	—	—	—	—	—
1946–47	Detroit Red Wings	NHL	60	9	14	23	14	4	1	4	5	0
1947–48	Detroit Red Wings	NHL	18	1	1	2	2	6	0	0	0	0
1947–48	Indianapolis Capitals	AHL	42	19	19	38	16	—	—	—	—	—
1948–49	Detroit Red Wings	NHL	1	0	0	0	0	—	—	—	—	—
1948–49	Indianapolis Capitals	AHL	61	20	18	38	16	2	0	0	0	0
1949–50	Omaha Knights	USHL	69	43	40	83	16	7	5	3	8	0
1950–51	Omaha Knights	USHL	56	39	27	66	10	10	6	5	11	0
1951–52	Indianapolis Capitals	AHL	56	20	21	41	0	—	—	—	—	—
1952–53	Milwaukee Chiefs	IHL	43	23	28	51	2	—	—	—	—	—
1953–54	Sherbrooke Saints	QSHL	71	14	35	49	4	5	2	3	5	0
AHL totals			172	62	62	124	38	2	0	0	0	0
NHL totals			180	40	42	82	35	27	6	6	12	0

== Awards and achievements ==
- Allan Cup Championship (1944)
- USHL Second All-Star Team (1950 & 1951)
- USHL Championship (1951)
- IHL Second All-Star Team (1953)
- Honoured Member of the Manitoba Hockey Hall of Fame
