= Norm McAtee =

Canadian ice hockey player

- Born: June 28, 1921 Stratford, Ontario, Canada
- Died: August 25, 2010 (aged 89) Troy, Ohio, United States
- Height: 5 ft 8 in (173 cm)
- Weight: 170 lb (77 kg; 12 st 2 lb)
- Position: Centre
- Shot: Left
- Played for: Boston Bruins
- Playing career: 1941–1954

Norman Joseph McAtee (June 28, 1921 – August 25, 2010) was a Canadian ice hockey player who played 13 games in the National Hockey League with the Boston Bruins during the 1946–47 season. The rest of his career, which lasted from 1941 to 1954, was spent in various minor leagues.

== Playing career ==
Born in Stratford, Ontario, he and his brother Jud played together in junior ice hockey with the Oshawa Generals during the years when the Generals dominated the Ontario Hockey League, winning championships with them in 1938–39. 1939–40 and 1940–41. At the end of the 1941 season, Norm joined his brother by signing as a free agent with the Detroit Red Wings in the NHL. However, beginning in 1942 and lasting throughout World War II, McAtee became a flying officer in the Royal Canadian Air Force. After his discharge in 1945, he teamed with his brother in the Red Wings farm system before the two of them were traded to the Chicago Blackhawks for Doug McCaig in December 1945. Just over a month later, Chicago traded him to Boston for Bill Jennings, and Norm joined the Bruins for 13 games, recording one assist. After that, he finished his career in the minor leagues, ending as player-coach with the Troy Bruins in Troy, Ohio from 1951 to 1954.

== Post-playing career ==
After his retirement from hockey, McAtee stayed in Troy, becoming a referee in the International Hockey League and a colour commentator for Dayton Gems games. He also worked for Sherwin-Williams until his retirement in 1984. He died in Troy, Ohio in 2010.

== Career statistics ==
=== Regular season and playoffs ===
			Regular season					Playoffs
Season	Team	League	GP	G	A	Pts	PIM	GP	G	A	Pts	PIM
1937–38	Stratford Midgets	OHA	14	9	8	17	6	7	2	1	3	0
1938–39	Oshawa Generals	OHA	13	6	4	10	0	7	4	1	5	5
1938–39	Oshawa Generals	M-Cup	—	—	—	—	—	7	4	1	5	5
1939–40	Oshawa Generals	OHA	18	17	18	35	9	15	2	18	20	15
1939–40	Oshawa Generals	M-Cup	—	—	—	—	—	9	6	7	13	0
1940–41	Oshawa Generals	OHA	14	15	12	27	2	10	10	9	19	2
1940–41	Oshawa Generals	M-Cup	—	—	—	—	—	5	4	2	6	2
1941–42	Philadelphia Rockets	AHL	30	9	15	24	6	—	—	—	—	—
1941–42	Omaha Knights	AHA	24	1	5	6	2	8	0	0	0	0
1942–43	Toronto RCAF	OHA Sr	2	0	1	1	5	9	7	5	12	10
1942–43	Toronto RCAF	Al-Cup	—	—	—	—	—	4	3	0	3	7
1943–44	Brantford RCAF	OHA Sr	—	—	—	—	—	—	—	—	—	—
1945–46	Indianapolis Capitals	AHL	30	5	8	13	9	—	—	—	—	—
1945–46	St. Louis Flyers	AHL	17	3	6	9	4	—	—	—	—	—
1945–46	Hershey Bears	AHL	14	4	12	16	4	—	—	—	—	—
1946–47	Boston Bruins	NHL	13	0	1	1	0	—	—	—	—	—
1946–47	Hershey Bears	AHL	40	5	7	12	2	2	0	0	0	0
1947–48	Hershey Bears	AHL	9	0	2	2	0	—	—	—	—	—
1947–48	Tulsa Oilers	USHL	57	14	20	34	9	2	0	0	0	0
1948–49	Washington Lions	AHL	64	14	28	42	13	—	—	—	—	—
1949–50	Sherbrooke Saints	QSHL	36	15	16	31	10	12	10	8	18	2
1950–51	Sherbrooke Saints	QSHL	50	15	30	45	12	5	1	3	4	2
1951–52	Troy Bruins	IHL	33	11	17	28	29	7	0	4	4	4
1952–53	Troy Bruins	IHL	59	29	35	64	15	6	1	3	4	2
1953–54	Troy Bruins	IHL	62	20	48	68	22	3	0	2	2	0
AHL totals			204	40	78	118	38	2	0	0	0	0
NHL totals			13	0	1	1	0	—	—	—	—	—
