= Milwaukee Chiefs =

Milwaukee Chiefs may refer to:

- Milwaukee Chiefs (AFL), team that competed in the third American Football League
- Milwaukee Chiefs (ice hockey), team that competed in the International Hockey League
