= Frank Eddolls =

Canadian ice hockey player (1921-1961)

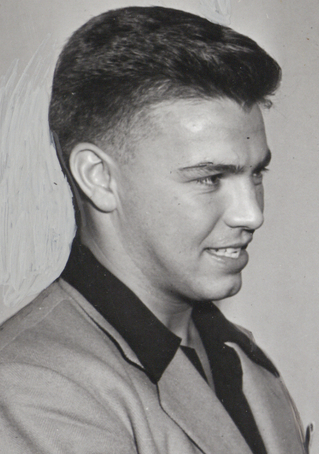
- Born: July 5, 1921 Lachine, Quebec, Canada
- Died: August 13, 1961 (aged 40) Ridgeway, Ontario, Canada
- Height: 5 ft 8 in (173 cm)
- Weight: 180 lb (82 kg; 12 st 12 lb)
- Position: Defence
- Shot: Left
- Played for: Montreal Canadiens; New York Rangers
- Playing career: 1941–1954

Frank Herbert Eddolls (July 5, 1921 – August 13, 1961) was a defenceman in the National Hockey League who played for the Montreal Canadiens and New York Rangers, and coached the Chicago Black Hawks in 1954–55. He won the Stanley Cup with Montreal in 1946. Eddolls is perhaps best remembered as being a returning piece in one of the most lopsided trades of all time, which saw him being moved by the Toronto Maple Leafs in exchange for future Hockey Hall of Fame member Ted Kennedy, who was later voted by multiple publications to be one of the greatest hockey players of all time.

Eddolls is known as one of the very few defencemen who consistently succeeded in defending against the legendary Maurice "Rocket" Richard.

Frank was playing golf on August 13, 1961, with friends at the Cherry Hill Country Club in Ridgeway, Ontario, one friend being Stan Mikita, when he complained on the 9th hole of heartburn. On the 17th hole, he collapsed and died of a heart attack.

== Career statistics ==
			Regular season					Playoffs
Season	Team	League	GP	G	A	Pts	PIM	GP	G	A	Pts	PIM
1937–38	Verdun Jr. Maple Leafs	MMJHL	12	2	5	7	8	4	0	1	1	2
1937–38	Verdun Maple Leafs	QSHL	1	0	0	0	0	—	—	—	—	—
1937–38	Verdun Jr. Maple Leafs	MC	—	—	—	—	—	5	4	5	9	12
1938–39	Verdun Jr. Maple Leafs	QJHL	10	9	5	14	24	3	1	1	2	8
1938–39	Verdun Maple Leafs	QSHL	1	0	0	0	0	—	—	—	—	—
1938–39	Verdun Jr. Maple Leafs	MC	—	—	—	—	—	7	4	4	8	22
1939–40	Oshawa Generals	OHA-Jr.	15	13	8	21	8	7	3	5	8	8
1939–40	Oshawa Generals	MC	—	—	—	—	—	8	1	2	3	24
1940–41	Oshawa Generals	OHA-Jr.	16	9	12	21	31	12	3	8	11	6
1940–41	Oshawa Generals	MC	—	—	—	—	—	5	2	8	10	14
1941–42	Hershey Bears	AHL	54	8	11	19	30	10	0	1	1	8
1942–43	Montreal RCAF	QSHL	35	8	10	18	42	12	2	6	8	8
1943–44	Montreal RCAF	MNDHL	1	0	0	0	2	—	—	—	—	—
1943–44	Montreal Canada Car	MCHL	1	0	0	0	0	—	—	—	—	—
1943–44	Montreal Services	MCHL	3	0	0	0	0	—	—	—	—	—
1944–45	Montreal Canadiens	NHL	43	5	8	13	20	3	0	0	0	0
1945–46	Montreal Canadiens	NHL	8	0	1	1	6	8	0	1	1	2
1945–46	Buffalo Bisons	AHL	34	6	23	29	52	—	—	—	—	—
1946–47	Montreal Canadiens	NHL	6	0	0	0	0	7	0	0	0	4
1946–47	Buffalo Bisons	AHL	29	3	7	10	18	4	0	5	5	0
1947–48	New York Rangers	NHL	58	6	13	19	16	2	0	0	0	0
1948–49	New York Rangers	NHL	34	4	2	6	10	—	—	—	—	—
1949–50	New York Rangers	NHL	58	2	6	8	20	11	0	1	1	4
1950–51	New York Rangers	NHL	68	3	8	11	24	—	—	—	—	—
1951–52	New York Rangers	NHL	42	3	5	8	18	—	—	—	—	—
1951–52	Saskatoon Quakers	PCHL	12	3	6	9	6	—	—	—	—	—
1951–52	Cincinnati Mohawks	AHL	12	0	4	4	8	—	—	—	—	—
1952–53	Buffalo Bisons	AHL	50	5	25	30	24	—	—	—	—	—
1953–54	Buffalo Bisons	AHL	63	3	52	55	45	3	0	2	2	2
AHL totals			242	25	122	147	177	17	0	8	8	10
NHL totals			317	23	43	66	114	31	0	2	2	10

== Coaching record ==
Team	Year	Regular season						Postseason
Team	Year	G	W	L	T	Pts	Division rank	Result
CHI	1954–55	70	13	40	17	43	6th in NHL	DNQ
Total		70	13	40	17	43		

== Transactions ==
- June 7, 1940 - Rights traded to Toronto by Montreal for the rights to Joe Benoit.
- September 10, 1943 - Traded to Montreal by Toronto for the rights to Ted Kennedy.
- August 19, 1947 - Traded to NY Rangers by Montreal with Buddy O'Connor for Hal Laycoe, Joe Bell and George Robertson.

Sporting positions
Preceded by Buddy O'Connor	New York Rangers captain 1950–51	Succeeded by Allan Stanley
Preceded by Sid Abel	Head coach of the Chicago Black Hawks; 1954–55	Succeeded by Dick Irvin
