= Jud McAtee =

Canadian ice hockey player

- Born: February 5, 1920 Stratford, Ontario, Canada
- Died: February 22, 2011 (aged 91) Collinsville, Oklahoma, USA
- Height: 5 ft 9 in (175 cm)
- Weight: 165 lb (75 kg; 11 st 11 lb)
- Position: Centre
- Shot: Left
- Played for: Detroit Red Wings
- Playing career: 1940–1950

Jerome Francis "Jud" McAtee (February 5, 1920 – February 22, 2011) was a Canadian ice hockey player who played 46 games in the National Hockey League with the Detroit Red Wings between 1942 and 1945.

== Playing career ==
Born in Stratford, Ontario, he and his brother Norm played together in junior ice hockey with the Oshawa Generals during the years when the Generals dominated the Ontario Hockey League, winning championships with them in both 1938–39 and 1939–40. In 1939–40, Jud led the league with 25 goals and 44 points before signing as a free agent with the Red Wings in the NHL after the season. During World War II. Jud played for the Red Wings in parts of three seasons (1942–43, 1943–44 and 1944–45), scoring 15 goals and 13 assists during the regular season and also participating in all 14 playoff games in his third season (2 goals, 1 assist) while forming a line with Syd Howe and Mud Bruneteau. During December 1945, Jud and Norm were both traded by the Red Wings to Chicago for Doug McCaig, and Jud never again played in the NHL. He ended up finishing his career in the minor leagues and retired from the Tulsa Oilers in 1950.

== Personal life ==
He was married to his wife Opal until her death on February 1, 1987, and never remarried.

He died in Collinsville, Oklahoma, on February 22, 2011, less than a year after his brother Norm's death on August 25, 2010.

== Career statistics ==
=== Regular season and playoffs ===
			Regular season					Playoffs
Season	Team	League	GP	G	A	Pts	PIM	GP	G	A	Pts	PIM
1936–37	Stratford Miners	OHA-B	9	7	7	14	2	—	—	—	—	—
1937–38	Stratford Midgets	OHA	14	12	7	19	6	7	2	0	2	4
1938–39	Oshawa Generals	OHA	14	2	3	5	6	7	3	1	4	2
1938–39	Oshawa Generals	M-Cup	—	—	—	—	—	7	3	1	4	2
1939–40	Oshawa Generals	OHA	18	25	19	44	12	15	16	10	26	28
1939–40	Oshawa Generals	M-Cup	—	—	—	—	—	8	7	6	13	20
1940–41	Indianapolis Capitals	AHL	54	11	13	24	6	—	—	—	—	—
1941–42	Indianapolis Capitals	AHL	54	16	23	39	4	10	3	3	6	0
1942–43	Detroit Red Wings	NHL	1	0	0	0	0	—	—	—	—	—
1942–43	Indianapolis Capitals	AHL	55	17	21	38	0	7	2	1	3	0
1943–44	Detroit Red Wings	NHL	1	0	2	2	0	—	—	—	—	—
1943–44	St. Catharines Saints	OHA Sr	20	14	9	23	14	5	1	2	3	0
1944–45	Detroit Red Wings	NHL	44	15	11	26	6	14	2	1	3	0
1944–45	Indianapolis Capitals	AHL	1	0	0	0	0	—	—	—	—	—
1945–46	Indianapolis Capitals	AHL	30	8	14	22	6	—	—	—	—	—
1945–46	St. Louis Flyers	AHL	32	7	10	17	8	—	—	—	—	—
1946–47	St. Louis Flyers	AHL	64	12	22	34	6	—	—	—	—	—
1947–48	St. Louis Flyers	AHL	14	1	4	5	0	—	—	—	—	—
1947–48	Hershey Bears	AHL	44	5	11	16	10	1	1	0	1	0
1948–49	Tulsa Oilers	USHL	49	22	34	56	4	—	—	—	—	—
1948–49	Hershey Bears	AHL	15	0	1	1	2	6	0	0	0	0
1949–50	Tulsa Oilers	USHL	42	9	13	22	12	—	—	—	—	—
AHL totals			363	77	119	196	42	24	6	4	10	0
NHL totals			46	15	13	28	6	14	2	1	3	0
