= Oshawa Generals =

Ontario Hockey League team in Oshawa

- City: Oshawa, Ontario
- League: Ontario Hockey League
- Conference: Eastern
- Division: East
- Founded: 1937–38
- Home arena: Tribute Communities Centre
- Colours: Red, blue and white
- General manager: Roger Hunt
- Head coach: Mario Pouliot
- Affiliates: Haliburton County Huskies; Port Perry Lumberjacks
- Website: www.oshawagenerals.com

Championships
- Playoff championships: OHL Champions 1938, 1939, 1940, 1941, 1942, 1943, 1944, 1966, 1983, 1987, 1990, 1997, 2015 Memorial Cups; 1939, 1940, 1944, 1990, 2015

Current uniform

The Oshawa Generals are a junior ice hockey team in the Ontario Hockey League. They are based in Oshawa, Ontario, Canada. The team is named for General Motors, an early sponsor which has its Canadian headquarters in Oshawa. In November 2016, the General Motors Centre changed its name to Tribute Communities Centre. Its 184 graduates to the National Hockey League are second in the OHL. The Generals have won the Memorial Cup five times (1939, 1940, 1944, 1990, 2015), as well as a record 13 Ontario Hockey League championships, the J. Ross Robertson Cup (1938, 1939, 1940, 1941, 1942, 1943, 1944, 1966, 1983, 1987, 1990, 1997, 2015)

The Generals have two distinct eras in their history. The original Generals operated from 1937 to 1953. The team went on a hiatus from 1953 to 1962 due to a fire at the Hambly Arena. The team was resurrected in 1962. Famous alumni of the Generals include Hockey Hall of Famers Bobby Orr, Ted Lindsay, Alex Delvecchio, Dave Andreychuk, and Eric Lindros.

== History ==
=== Early years (1908–1937) ===
Prior to 1908, Oshawa belonged to the Midland Hockey League. It competed against other teams from Whitby, Bowmanville, Port Hope and Cobourg. The first Oshawa team in the Ontario Hockey Association junior division began play in the 1908–1909 season, known as the Oshawa Shamrocks. Ed Bradley, a prominent local businessman was responsible for organizing the team and bringing junior hockey to Oshawa and was the team's manager for the next 13 seasons.

Success came early to the team reaching the semifinals in 1909. In the 1920s, the team enjoyed many successful years, battling against Orillia and Owen Sound. In June 1928, Bradley's Arena burnt to the ground. The team relocated to Whitby until the new Oshawa Arena was built for 1930.

In the early 1930s, the team became known as the Oshawa Majors. The Majors won the OHA title in 1935 versus the Kitchener Greenshirts, and played the Northern Ontario champion Sudbury Cub Wolves. In a protest by Kitchener, the title was taken away from Oshawa while games were already underway with Sudbury.

In 1936, different sources name the team as the Majors, the Red Devils, and the Junior G-Men. This team coached by Bill Hancock and managed by Matt Leyden played the season against St. Michael's College, University of Toronto, Toronto Young Rangers, Toronto Marlboros, Toronto Native Sons and the Toronto Lions.

=== OHA dynasty (1937–1944) ===
The team logo from 1937–38 to 1948–49

In 1937, the Oshawa Generals were created and named after the sponsor, General Motors of Canada. The Generals put together an unequalled feat of seven consecutive OHA Championships, and winning three Memorial Cups in the same span.

The Generals grew a reputation for treating its players well and signed many young men who would go on to National Hockey League fame. Players were admitted free to theatres, dancing, wrestling, roller skating and other attractions at the arena. Sponsors gave full scholarships to school and weekly stipends. Through the whole dynasty, the team was managed by Matt Leyden, and its secretary was Neil Hezzlewood. Both men would be inducted in the Oshawa Sports Hall of fame.

From 1937 to 1944, Oshawa Generals graduated 20 players to become NHL alumni, and another player in David Bauer, who would be inducted into the Hockey Hall of Fame in the Builder's Category. NHL alumni from 1937 to 1944 include; Frank Bennett, Harvey Bennett, Les Colvin, Jim Conacher, Floyd Curry, Buck Davies, Bob Dawes, Jim Drummond, Frank Eddolls, Bill Ezinicki, Armand (Bep) Guidolin, Nick Knott, Ted Lindsay, Jud McAtee, Norm McAtee, Gus Mortson, Chuck Scherza, Ken Smith, Billy "The Kid" Taylor and Wally Wilson.

=== Fire (1953) ===
On September 14, 1953 Hambly's Arena burned down. The city lost their arena, and their OHA team. Donations poured in from many fellow OHA teams and local businessmen. Equipment and other items were disbursed to all the players attending the training camp to cover individual losses. The Generals, homeless so close to the start of the new season, were disbanded.

Salvaged from the disbanded team, General Manager Wren Blair made a Senior B team known as the Oshawa Truckmen, who played in Bowmanville for the 1953–1954 season. The year after, this team became the Whitby Dunlops. The Dunlops were Allan Cup Champions in 1957 & 1959, and World Champions in 1958.

=== Rebirth of the Generals (1962) ===
In 1960, Wren Blair began negotiations with Boston Bruins president Weston Adams to begin building the new Oshawa Generals. The agreement was made contingent on a new arena being built in Oshawa. The Oshawa Civic Auditorium would open in 1964.

In the meantime, the Oshawa Generals were reactivated for the 1962–1963 as a team playing in the Metro Junior A League. For this year, the team played its home games at Maple Leaf Gardens. Fundraising for a new arena was well under way at the same time.

The Generals wore red, white and blue jerseys until the 1965–66 season when they adopted the black, gold and white of their parent team, the Boston Bruins.

In 1963 the Metro Junior A league was disbanded, and Oshawa was readmitted in the OHA. Since the Toronto Marlboros used Maple Leaf Gardens as a home rink, the Generals team played out of nearby Bowmanville for one full season, and part of another.

=== The Bobby Orr years (1962–1966) ===
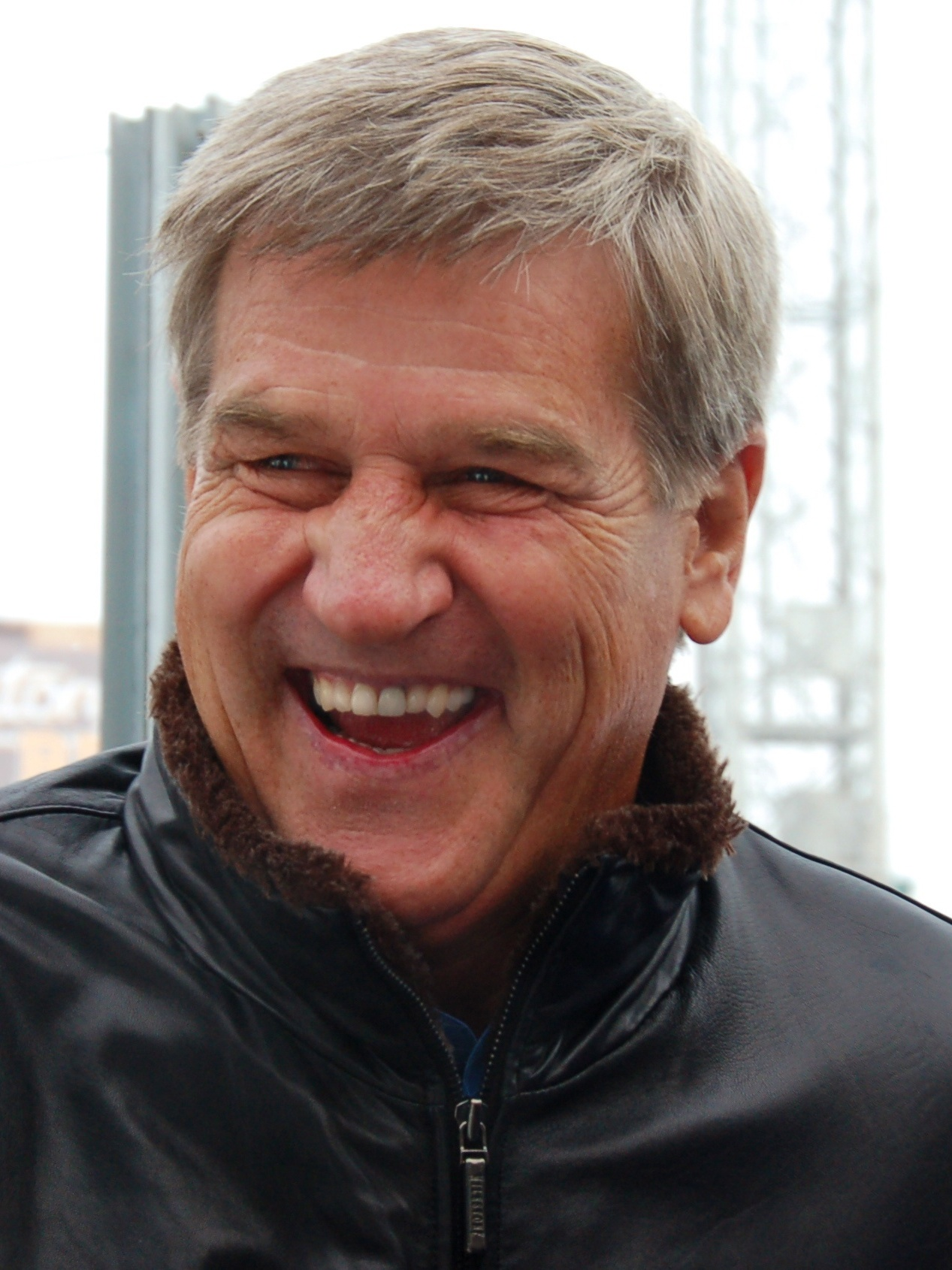
Bobby Orr pictured in 2010

The greatest player ever to wear an Oshawa Generals uniform, Bobby Orr, became a legend in the NHL and to be inducted in the Hockey Hall of Fame.

Orr was discovered by Wren Blair as a 14-year-old while playing a game in Gananoque, Ontario. He was quickly signed to a contract and invited to training camp for the 1962–63 season. He would commute three hours from Parry Sound for all weekend games he played with the Generals that year. Even so, he was selected to the Metro Junior A League's second all-star team.

During the 1963–64 season (his first full season in Junior A hockey), Bobby Orr scored 29 goals to break the record for most goals by a defenceman, previously held by Jacques Laperriere. Orr was also selected as a first team all-star defenceman.

During the 1964–65 season, the Generals moved into their new home at the Oshawa Civic Auditorium. Orr broke his own record, scoring 34 goals that season.

In the 1965–66 season, Oshawa returned to the Memorial Cup after a 22-year absence. The Generals were coached that year by alumnus Armand "Bep" Guidolin, who played for Oshawa in the 1942 Memorial Cup, and subsequently made the Boston Bruins of the National Hockey League (NHL) as a 16-year-old. Team captain Bobby Orr scored 38 goals during the season.

The Generals defeated their bitter rivals, the St. Catharines Black Hawks, in the quarter-finals before eliminating the Montreal Junior Canadiens in the semi-finals, and winning the J. Ross Robertson Cup over the Kitchener Rangers.

The Generals then outscored the Northern Ontario Junior A champion North Bay Trappers by a combined score of 43–9 to win the series in four games, and then defeated Shawinigan Bruins in three games to be the Eastern Canadian representative for the Memorial Cup.

In the Memorial Cup series, Orr played injured through most games, but the team lost to the Edmonton Oil Kings in six games.

After the season ended, many players graduated from the team and moved on: Orr went to the Bruins, Blair became general manager of the NHL's Minnesota North Stars and head coach Guidolin returned to coaching in Thorold.

=== Ninth championship (1983) ===
The team logo from 1962–63 to 1964–65; 1967–68 to 1973–74 and 1984–85 to 2005–06

After many dismal seasons through the late 1960s and 1970s, the Generals began to rebuild for a run at the Memorial Cup. In 1979, the Generals hired Head Coach Paul Theriault, who would lead the team to nine consecutive winning seasons, including two Memorial Cup appearances.

In 1983, the Generals returned to the Memorial Cup after a 17-year absence, defeating the Sault Ste. Marie Greyhounds for their ninth J. Ross Robertson Cup. The Memorial Cup that year was played in Portland, Oregon. The Generals lost in the finals to the host team, the Portland Winter Hawks, by a score of 8–3. That year's team captain, defenceman Joe Cirella, went on to play 16 years in the NHL.

=== Tragedy (1985) ===
During an early season practice, Bruce Melanson left the ice feeling very weak. Within a few minutes he collapsed, succumbing to a congenital heart disorder known as Wolff–Parkinson–White syndrome. He was 18 years old at the time. The Generals wore black arm bands for the remainder of the season in memoriam of their teammate they nicknamed "Moose." In his honour, his number 9 was never worn by another member of the Generals and was later retired in 2006 for the late Red Tilson. A memorial scholarship was also set up at his former high school in New Brunswick. The Generals now hand out an award to the most scholarly student, named the Bruce Melanson Scholactic Player of the Year Award. Melanson's hard-hitting and aggressive style led him to be selected by New York Islanders in the second round, 41st overall, in the 1984 NHL entry draft.

=== Hosting the Memorial Cup (1987) ===
In the 1986–87 season the Generals set a team record with 101 points for the season. The Generals played on home ice in the Memorial Cup, as the host city and as the OHL champions.

In 1987, the OHL organized a "super series" for the right to host the Memorial Cup tournament between the Leyden Division-winning Generals and the Emms Division-winning North Bay Centennials. The super series was played before the OHL playoffs commenced, and Oshawa defeated North Bay four games to three for the right to host the Memorial Cup. Coincidentally, Oshawa also won the OHL championship series defeating North Bay four games to three. Since Oshawa won both the super series and the OHL championship, only three teams participated in the Memorial Cup. Oshawa reached the finals against the Medicine Hat Tigers, but lost 6–2 in the championship game.

=== Eric Lindros and a fourth Memorial Cup (1989–1991) ===
Eric Lindros was drafted by the Sault Ste. Marie Greyhounds, but refused to play for them, forcing the Greyhounds to trade him. After arriving in Oshawa, Lindros turned out to be the player the Generals needed to reach the Memorial Cup, in addition to the existing core of players captained by Iain Fraser.

After playing for the Canadian National Team, Lindros started his rookie year with the Generals in 1989–90. Lindros would go on to score 17 goals and 19 assists in only 25 games. The same year in the playoffs, he scored 18 goals and 18 assists in only 17 games.

Copps Coliseum hosted the 1990 Memorial Cup. The Generals played against the Kamloops Blazers, Laval Titan and the OHL runners-up, the Kitchener Rangers. The championship game on May 13, 1990, attracted 17,383 spectators who eventually witnessed the Generals defeat the Rangers 4–3 in double overtime on a goal scored by Bill Armstrong. This was the fourth Memorial Cup in Generals history.

In the subsequent off-season, Lindros was chosen first overall at the 1991 NHL entry draft by the Quebec Nordiques. Entering the 1990–91 season, the Generals were expected to repeat as OHL champions. In 57 regular season games, Lindros again led the team in points after scoring 71 goals and 78 assists. The Generals, however, lost the OHL final that year to Lindros' draft team, the Sault Ste. Marie.

=== Twelfth OHL Championship (1997) ===
The Generals set the benchmark for other OHL teams by winning their 12th J. Ross Robertson Cup in 1997.

The Generals upset the first place Ottawa 67's in the OHL final, 4–2. The sixth game ended just eight seconds into the first overtime on a goal from Marc Savard.

The Generals then participated in the 1997 Memorial Cup in Hull, Quebec, in which they finished third in the round robin and lost in the semifinal to the Lethbridge Hurricanes in overtime.

Future NHL players from Oshawa's 1997 roster included Marc Savard, John Tripp, Ian MacNeil, Kevin Colley, Dan Hinote, Jeff Ware, Bryan Allen, Jeff MacMillan and Tyrone Garner.

=== New ownership, new home (2004 to present) ===
In 2004, John Davies purchased the team from John Humphreys. This marked the beginning of a new era for the team, as the Humphreys family had owned the team since its resurrection in 1962.

In 2005, the Generals drafted 14-year-old John Tavares first overall in the OHL Priority Selection; he was previously granted Exceptional Player Status by the OHL, which allowing him to be drafted one year earlier than the norm. Following his selection, the Generals worked to build another championship team centered around Tavares. Other building blocks added to the team included Michael Del Zotto, Dale Mitchell, Cal Clutterbuck, Brett MacLean (then one of the youngest players in the OHL), goaltender Anthony Peters and eventually Calvin de Haan.

The new ownership also brought to an end the Generals era playing in the Civic Auditorium. Led by Oshawa Mayor John Gray, the Generals were able to call a new arena in downtown Oshawa their home. The team moved into the General Motors Centre on November 1, 2006, and played the inaugural game on November 3 against the Owen Sound Attack.

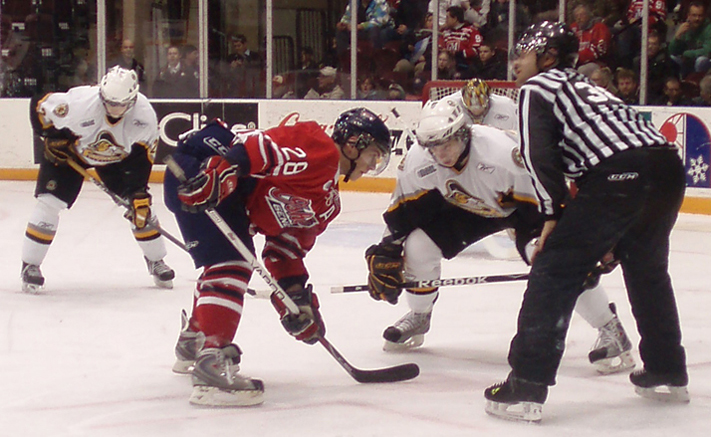
Captain Brett Parnham in 2009

After topping scoring boards and points lists with the Generals for three and a half seasons, John Tavares and Michael Del Zotto were traded to the London Knights on January 8, 2009, and a new crop of young talent was brought onto the Generals team. Christian Thomas, Scott Valentine and Michael Zador, along with several draft picks, were part of the Tavares deal. Other additions included Tony DeHart and Lucas Lessio, a result of one of London's draft picks that was traded to Oshawa.

In July 2008, the Generals' executive team announced a change of ownership structure, with Rocco Tullio of Windsor, Ontario, agreeing to terms and conditions with John Davies to acquire his remaining shares of the Generals. In January 2010, Tullio welcomed two new partners as owners – former NHL star and Stanley Cup champion Adam Graves and former championship OHL coach and manager Peter DeBoer.

=== 2015: Return to the Memorial Cup ===
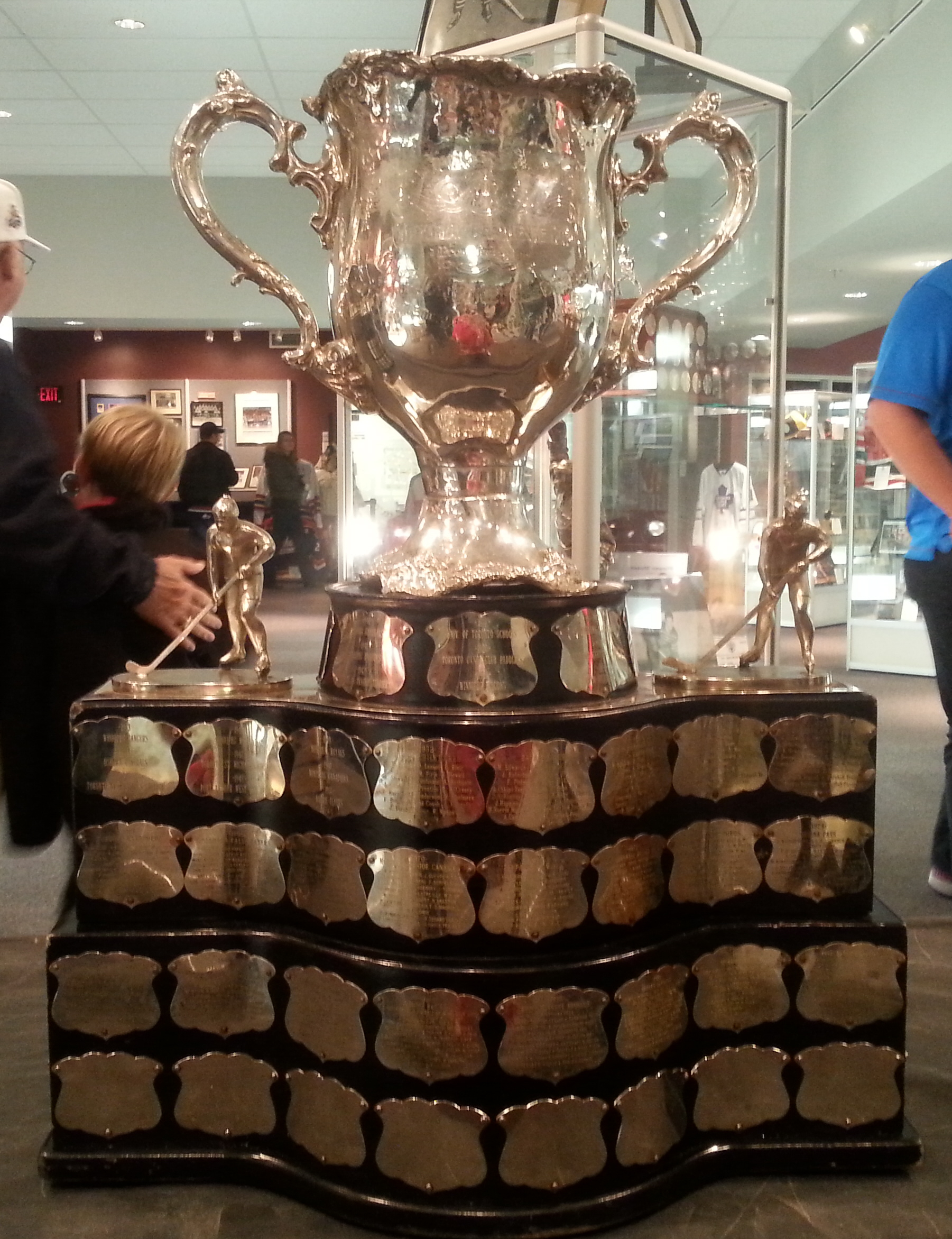
Photo of the Memorial Cup at the Oshawa Sports Hall of Fame in 2015

For the first time since 1997, the Oshawa Generals made it back to the Memorial Cup in 2015. In the 2014–15 season, the Generals won their 13th J. Ross Robertson Cup, defeating the Erie Otters. At the 2015 Memorial Cup, they won all three of their round robin games and clinched a spot in the tournament final. They defeated the Kelowna Rockets in the final after Anthony Cirelli scored the game-winning goal in overtime.

== Championships ==
The Generals have won 13 J. Ross Robertson Cup championships, the most in OHL history. Oshawa also has won five Memorial Cup championships which is the most by an active OHL team.

Hamilton Spectator Trophy
First overall in the OHL regular season standings.

- 1986–87 101 points
- 1989–90 88 points
- 1990–91 100 points

Leyden Trophy
First overall in the Eastern Division regular season standings.

- 1986–87 101 points
- 1989–90 88 points
- 1990–91 100 points
- 2013–14 90 points
- 2014–15 108 points
- 2023–24 89 points

Bobby Orr Trophy
Eastern Conference Champions.

- 2014–15
- 2023–24
- 2024–25

J. Ross Robertson Cup
Ontario Hockey League Championship

- 1935 Lost by default to Kitchener Greenshirts
- 1938 OHA Champions vs. Guelph Indians
- 1939 OHA Champions vs. Toronto Native Sons
- 1940 OHA Champions vs. Toronto Marlboros
- 1941 OHA Champions vs. Toronto Marlboros
- 1942 OHA Champions vs. Guelph Biltmores
- 1943 OHA Champions vs. Brantford Lions
- 1944 OHA Champions vs. Toronto St. Michael's Majors
- 1946 Lost to St. Michael's
- 1966 OHA Champions vs. Kitchener Rangers
- 1983 OHL Champions vs. Sault Ste. Marie Greyhounds
- 1987 OHL Champions vs. North Bay Centennials
- 1990 OHL Champions vs. Kitchener Rangers
- 1991 Lost to Sault Ste. Marie Greyhounds
- 1997 OHL Champions vs. Ottawa 67's
- 2015 OHL Champions vs. Erie Otters
- 2024 Lost to London Knights
- 2025 Lost to London Knights

George Richardson Memorial Trophy
Eastern Canadian Championship

- 1938 Champions vs. Perth Blue Wings
- 1939 Champions vs. Verdun Maple Leafs
- 1940 Champions vs. Verdun Maple Leafs
- 1941 Lost to Montreal Royals
- 1942 Champions vs. Ottawa St. Patrick's
- 1943 Champions vs. Montreal Junior Canadiens
- 1944 Champions vs. Montreal Junior Canadiens
- 1966 Champions vs. Shawinigan Bruins

Memorial Cup
Canadian Hockey League Championship

- 1938 Lost to St. Boniface Seals
- 1939 CAHA Champions vs. Edmonton Athletic Club
- 1940 CAHA Champions vs. Kenora Thistles
- 1942 Lost to Portage la Prairie Terriers
- 1943 Lost to Winnipeg Rangers
- 1944 CAHA Champions vs. Trail Smoke Eaters
- 1966 Lost to Edmonton Oil Kings
- 1983 Lost to Portland Winter Hawks
- 1987 Lost to Medicine Hat Tigers
- 1990 CHL Champions vs. Kitchener Rangers
- 1997 OHL Champion in Hull, Quebec
- 2015 CHL Champions vs. Kelowna Rockets

== Coaches ==
The Generals have had several head coaches who have also coached at the NHL level as head and/or assistant coaches including Charlie Conacher, Armand "Bep" Guidolin, Paul Theriault, Bill LaForge, Bill Stewart, George Burnett, Brad Selwood, Randy Ladouceur and D. J. Smith.

Coaches of the year;

Matt Leyden Trophy winners.

- 1971–72 Gus Bodnar
- 1977–78 Bill White
- 1986–87 Paul Theriault
- 2013–14 D. J. Smith
- 2023–24 Derek Laxdal

=== List of coaches ===
- 1937–1938 Doc Rowden
- 1938–1941 Tracy Shaw
- 1941–1942 Tracy Shaw and Charlie Conacher
- 1941–1947 Charlie Conacher
- 1947–1950 Tommy Anderson
- 1950–1952 Larry Aurie
- 1952–1953 Gerry Brown
- 1962–1963 Doug Williams
- 1963–1965 Jim Cherry
- 1965–1966 Bep Guidolin
- 1966–1967 Ted O'Connor
- 1967–1969 Ike Hildebrand
- 1969–1970 Doug Williams
- 1970–1971 Eddy Reigle
- 1971–1976 Gus Bodnar
- 1976–1977 Sherwood Bassin
- 1977–1979 Bill White
- 1979–1980 Paul Theriault
- 1980–1981 Bill LaForge
- 1981–1989 Paul Theriault
- 1989–1994 Rick Cornacchia
- 1994–1996 Stan Butler
- 1996–1997 Bill Stewart
- 1997–2000 John Goodwin
- 2000–2004 George Burnett
- 2004–2005 Bob McGill, Brad Selwood and Randy Ladouceur
- 2005–2006 Randy Ladouceur and Brad Selwood
- 2006–2007 Brad Selwood
- 2007–2008 Brad Selwood and Chris DePiero
- 2008–2012 Chris DePiero and Gary Agnew
- 2012–2015 D. J. Smith
- 2015–2018 Bob Jones
- 2018–2021 Greg Walters
- 2021–2022 Todd Miller
- 2022–2024 Derek Laxdal
- 2024–2025 Steve O'Rourke and Brad Malone
- 2025–2026 Mario Pouliot

== Players ==
The Oshawa Generals have sent 184 players onto the NHL, third behind the Toronto Marlboros and the Peterborough Petes for most graduated future NHLers from the OHL. Five Generals have gone on to become honoured in the Hockey Hall of Fame.

=== Award winners ===
CHL Player of the Year

- 1990–91 Eric Lindros
- 2006–07 John Tavares

CHL Top Scorer Award

- 1994–95 Marc Savard

CHL Rookie of the Year

- 2005–06 John Tavares

CHL Top Draft Prospect Award

- 1990–91 Eric Lindros
- 2008–09 John Tavares

Red Tilson Trophy
OHL Most Outstanding Player.

- 1952–53 Bob Attersley
- 1972–73 Rick Middleton
- 1986–87 Scott McCrory
- 1990–91 Eric Lindros
- 2006–07 John Tavares

Eddie Powers Memorial Trophy
OHL Top Point Scorer.

- 1933–34 J. J. Graboski
- 1936–37 Billy "The Kid" Taylor
- 1938–39 Billy "The Kid" Taylor
- 1939–40 Jud McAtee
- 1942–43 Red Tilson
- 1943–44 Ken Smith
- 1950–51 Lou Jankowski
- 1986–87 Scott McCrory
- 1990–91 Eric Lindros
- 1994–95 Marc Savard
- 1996–97 Marc Savard

OHL Goaltender of the Year
Voted best goaltender in the OHL.

- 1991–92 Mike Fountain
- 2023–24 Jacob Oster

Jim Mahon Memorial Trophy
OHL Top Scoring Right Winger.

- 1980–81 Tony Tanti
- 1981–82 Tony Tanti
- 1987–88 Sean Williams
- 1990–91 Rob Pearson

Jack Ferguson Award
First overall draft pick.

- 2005 John Tavares
- 2026 Kane Cloutier

Dave Pinkney Trophy
Lowest team goals against average.

- 1982–83 Peter Sidorkiewicz & Jeff Hogg
- 1986–87 Jeff Hackett & Sean Evoy
- 2014–15 Ken Appleby & Jeremy Brodeur

Emms Family Award
Rookie of the year.

- 1980–81 Tony Tanti
- 2005–06 John Tavares

F. W. "Dinty" Moore Trophy
Best rookie goals against average.

- 1986–87 Jeff Hackett
- 1992–93 Ken Shepard
- 2011–12 Daniel Altshuller

William Hanley Trophy
Most sportsmanlike player.

- 1986–87 Scott McCrory
- 1988–89 Kevin Miehm
- 1990–91 Dale Craigwell

Leo Lalonde Memorial Trophy
Overage player of the year.

- 1989–90 Iain Fraser
- 1992–93 Scott Hollis

Bobby Smith Trophy
Scholastic player of the year.

- 1979–80 Steve Konroyd

=== Retired numbers ===
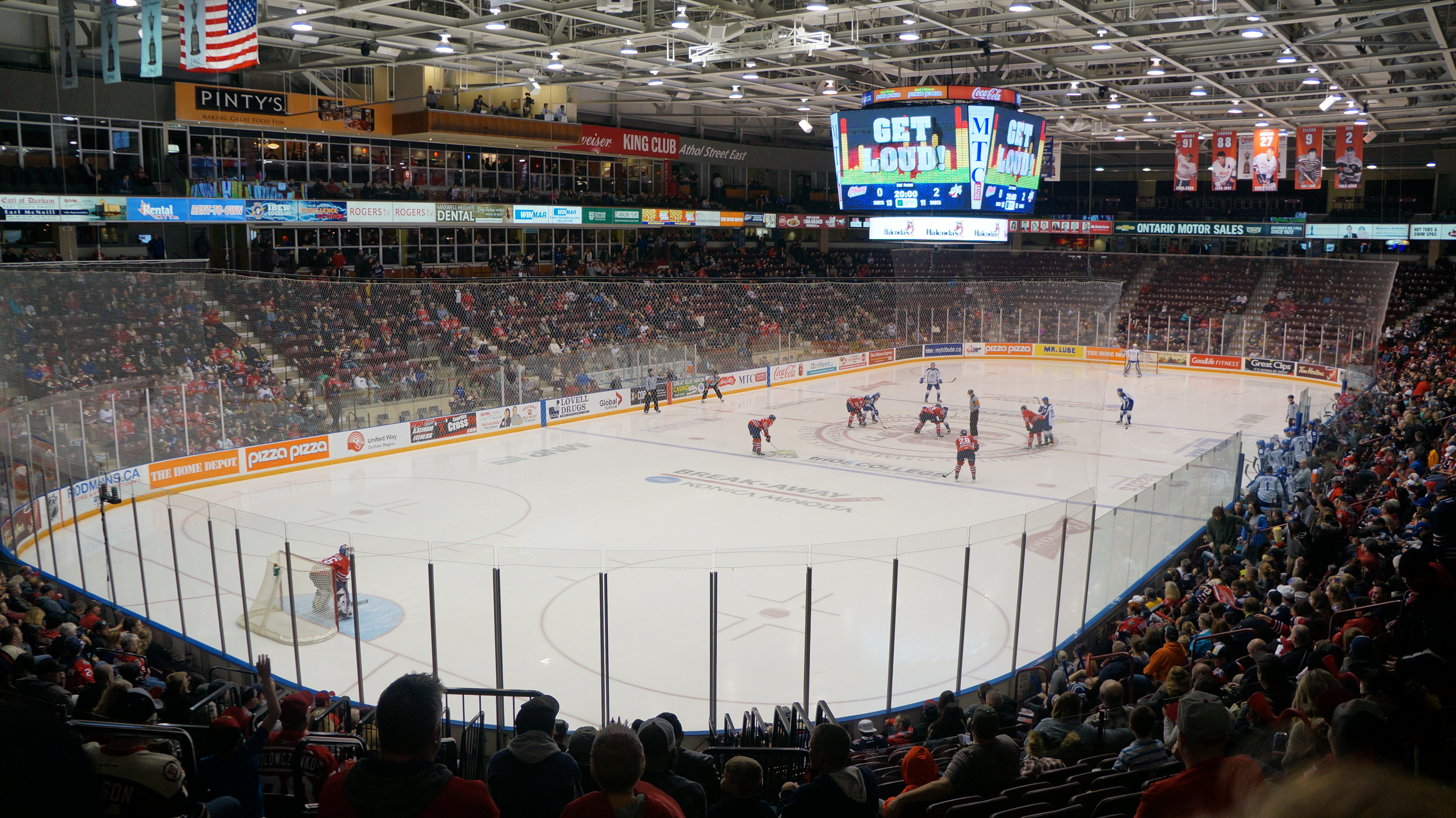
Banners honouring retired numbers (top right) hang from the rafters of the Tribute Communities Centre

The Oshawa Generals retired number nine in honour of Red Tilson at a pregame Remembrance Day ceremony on November 12, 2006. Tilson was the league's leading scorer during the 1942–43 who died during combat in World War II. The Red Tilson Trophy for the OHL's most outstanding player is named in his honour. Eric Lindros' number 88 was retired on March 6, 2008. Bobby Orr's number 2 was officially retired on November 27, 2008, after having been out of circulation since Orr moved on to the NHL in 1966. John Tavares' number 91 was retired on September 28, 2014. Number 27 was retired on October 2, 2016, in honour of Marc Savard. The most recently retired number of 17 for Terry O'Reilly, on September 28, 2025.

- # 2 Bobby Orr (1963–1966)
- # 9 Red Tilson (1941–1943)
- # 9 Dave Andreychuk (1980–1983)
- # 17 Terry O'Reilly (1967–1971)
- # 22 Tony Tanti (1980–1983)
- # 27 Marc Savard (1993-1997)
- # 88 Eric Lindros (1989–1992)
- # 91 John Tavares (2005–2009)

Honoured numbers Bruce Melanson was last player to wear number nine. It was taken out of circulation after his death, then later retired for both Red Tilson and Dave Andreychuk.

- # 9 Bruce Melanson (1983–1985) – died during season.

=== Hockey Hall of Fame members ===
Players

- Dave Andreychuk
- Alex Delvecchio
- Eric Lindros
- Ted Lindsay
- Bobby Orr

Builders

- David Bauer
- Harry Sinden

=== NHL alumni ===
List of Oshawa Generals alumni to play in the National Hockey League.

- Bryan Allen
- Mike Amodeo
- Andy Andreoff
- Dave Andreychuk
- Jason Arnott
- John Arundel
- Chris Beckford-Tseu
- Jan Benda
- Frank Bennett
- Harvey Bennett
- Adam Berti
- Nick Beverley
- Don Biggs
- Chuck Blair
- Dusty Blair
- Ivan Boldirev
- Eric Boulton
- Fred Brathwaite
- Gerry Brown
- Josh Brown
- Ron Buchanan
- Steve Cardwell
- Wayne Cashman
- Ray Ceresino
- Todd Charlesworth
- Lex Chisholm
- Joe Cirella
- Anthony Cirelli
- Cal Clutterbuck
- Kevin Colley
- Les Colvin
- Jim Conacher
- Larry Courville
- Mike Craig
- Dale Craigwell
- Bobby Crawford
- Floyd Curry
- Michael Dal Colle
- Jeff Daniels
- Buck Davies
- Bob Dawes
- Dean De Fazio
- Dale DeGray
- Calvin de Haan
- Val Delory
- Alex Delvecchio
- Michael Del Zotto
- Jim Drummond
- Ben Eager
- Frank Eddolls
- Bill Ezinicki
- George Ferguson
- Lee Fogolin Jr.
- Rick Foley
- Mike Fountain
- Iain Fraser
- Bob Froese
- Dick Gamble
- Dave Gans
- Paul Gardner
- Tyrone Garner
- Lee Giffin
- Trevor Gillies
- Bob Gladney
- Dan Gratton
- Gilles Gratton
- Brent Grieve
- Bep Guidolin
- Jeff Hackett
- Paul Harrison
- Chris Hayes
- Bill Heindl
- Ike Hildebrand
- Floyd Hillman
- Dan Hinote
- Larry Hopkins
- Nathan Horton
- Charlie Huddy
- Jim Jackson
- Lou Jankowski
- Boone Jenner
- Nicklas Jensen
- Ross Johnstone
- Tony Joseph
- Claude Julien
- Doug Keans
- Bob Kelly
- Rick Kessell
- Derek King
- Brian Kinsella
- Nick Knott
- Steve Konroyd
- Joe Kowal
- Pete Laframboise
- Leo Lamoureux
- Mitch Lamoureux
- Rick Lanz
- Scott Laughton
- Mike Lenarduzzi
- Lucas Lessio
- Tobias Lindberg
- Eric Lindros
- Ted Lindsay
- Bill Lochead
- Ross Lowe
- Charlie Luksa
- Jack Lynch
- Calum MacKay
- Shawn MacKenzie
- Brett MacLean
- John MacLean
- Jeff MacMillan
- Ian MacNeil
- Bud MacPherson
- Greg Malone
- Jud McAtee
- Norm McAtee
- Michael McCarron
- Tom McCarthy
- Bob McCulley
- Brian McGrattan
- Kirk McLean
- Sean McMorrow
- Chris McRae
- Bryan McSheffrey
- Roland Melanson
- Julian Melchiori
- Dakota Mermis
- Rick Middleton
- Kevin Miehm
- Chris Minard
- Dean Morton
- Gus Mortson
- Gord Murphy
- Michal Neuvirth
- Brandon Nolan
- Lee Norwood
- Hank Nowak
- Fred O'Donnell
- Terry O'Reilly
- Danny O'Shea
- Oskar Olausson
- Bobby Orr
- Jim Paek
- Rob Pearson
- Nathan Perrott
- Andrew Peters
- Steve Peters
- Wayne Primeau
- Dave Pulkkinen
- Nelson Pyatt
- Brad Ralph
- Paul Ranger
- Greg Redquest
- Ed Reigle
- Pat Ribble
- Calum Ritchie
- Phil Samis
- Marc Savard
- Chuck Scherza
- Norm Schmidt
- Richard Scott
- Travis Scott
- Beckett Sennecke
- Sean Shanahan
- Peter Sidorkiewicz
- Harry Sinden
- Jarrod Skalde
- Ken Smith
- Sid Smith
- Rick St. Croix
- Greg Stefan
- Bud Stefanski
- John Stevens
- Bob Stewart
- Riley Stillman
- Jack Studnicka
- Barry Sullivan
- Frank Sullivan
- Peter Sullivan
- Don Sylvestri
- Dale Tallon
- Tony Tanti
- John Tavares
- Billy Taylor
- Christian Thomas
- Philip Tomasino
- Kirk Tomlinson
- John Tripp
- Pete Vipond
- Jeff Ware
- Barry Wilkins
- Butch Williams
- Sean Williams
- Dunc Wilson
- Wally Wilson
- Stephane Yelle
- Rod Zaine

== Season-by-season results ==
The Oshawa Generals have won three Hamilton Spectator trophies for finishing first overall in the OHL regular season standings, and five Leyden trophies for finishing first overall in the eastern division OHL regular season standings. The Oshawa Generals have won 13 J. Ross Robertson Cups as the OHL/OHA playoff champions, and won five Memorial Cups as the CHL/CAHA champions.

== Uniforms and logos ==
The current version of the Oshawa Generals uniforms has been in use since the 1989–90 season. The team has announced an updated logo to coincide with moving into a new arena. The new logo cresting will be triple layered as opposed to the single layer. Players' names and numbers with have double cresting.

The Oshawa Generals have also issued two throwback style jerseys in the recent past. During alumni week for the 2001–02 season, the Generals wore a jersey based on the 'Bruins" style worn in the 1965–66 season, when Bobby Orr skated for the club. For two seasons from 2004–05 to 2005–06 the Generals "red" jersey was replaced by a jersey based on the style worn during the 1939, 1940 and 1944 Memorial Cup winning seasons, featuring the square "GM" logo.

The Generals unveiled a new mascot during a pregame ceremony on November 16, 2007, who would be named "Deke" in a naming contest in Oshawa. The previous mascot, "General Shooter," had been retired at the end of the 2006–07 season.

== Arenas ==
The Oshawa Generals have the dubious distinction of having their home arena destroyed by fire not once, but twice in the franchise history. In June 1928 the Bradley Arena was destroyed by fire. Then 25 years later, the Hambly Arena was also destroyed by fire.

From 1928 to 1930, the team played out of nearby Whitby until the Hambly Arena was constructed. When the Hambly Arena burned down in 1953, the Oshawa Generals were disbanded. When the team was resurrected in 1962, they played both at Maple Leaf Gardens and also in the Bowmanville Community Arena (now demolished) for two seasons until moving until the Civic Auditorium.

=== The early years ===
Before Oshawa joined the OHA in 1908, it was part of the Midland Hockey League. Its games were played out of the Oshawa Curling Club located by the Oshawa Creek in the vicinity of present-day Valleyview Gardens, Kinsmen Stadium and Children's Arena. Since the curling club controlled its use and thus when games could or could not be played, a new location was sought.

A new outdoor rink was built four blocks away, where the present day Oshawa Armouries stand at the corner of Simcoe St. and Richmond St. This would be the team's home until 1908.

=== Bradley Arena 1908–1928 ===
The Bradley Arena, nicknamed "The Big Rink," opened up in 1908 on Duke St. in downtown Oshawa. Its namesake was Ed Bradley, a prominent local businessman who was responsible for organizing the team and bringing Junior Hockey to Oshawa.

The arena was packed to the rafters many nights when Oshawa played there for the 1920s League championships versus Orillia and Owen Sound. In June 1928, the predominantly wooden structure succumbed to an overnight fire.

=== Hambly Arena 1930–1953 ===
The Oshawa Arena (later known as the Hambly Arena) opened in 1930 and was built in large part to the contributions of Colonel Robert Samuel McLaughlin. It was the first brick facade and steel support structure for hockey in Oshawa. Shortly after training camp in 1953, the arena would suffer the same demise as its predecessor and burned to the ground on September 15.

=== Civic Auditorium 1964–2006 ===
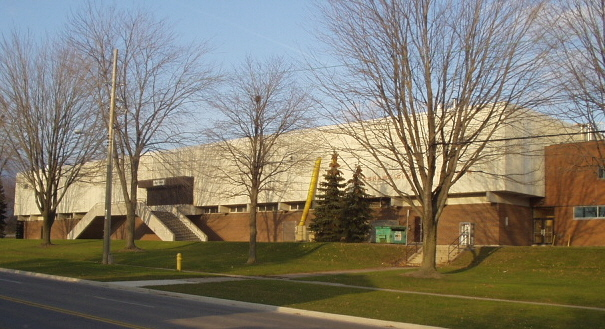
Oshawa Civic Auditorium in 2006

The Oshawa Civic Auditorium opened in 1964, built on fundraising by citizens of Oshawa. The first scheduled OHA game was December 15, 1964 vs. the St. Catharines Black Hawks. The Generals prevailed by a score of 6 to 4 in front of 4,109 fans attending the game.

In 1987 the Civic Auditorium played host to the Memorial Cup. The Generals contested for the cup against the Medicine Hat Tigers and the Longueuil Chévaliers.

The last championship the Generals won was played at the Civic in May 1997. The Generals upset the 1st place Ottawa 67's in the OHL final, 4 games to 2. The sixth game ended 8 seconds into the first overtime on a goal from Marc Savard.

The Generals played the first five home games of the 2006–07 season in the Civic Auditorium before moving into their new arena. The final game played was October 29, 2006, against the Kingston Frontenacs, the Generals won 8–6.

=== Downtown arena 2006–present ===
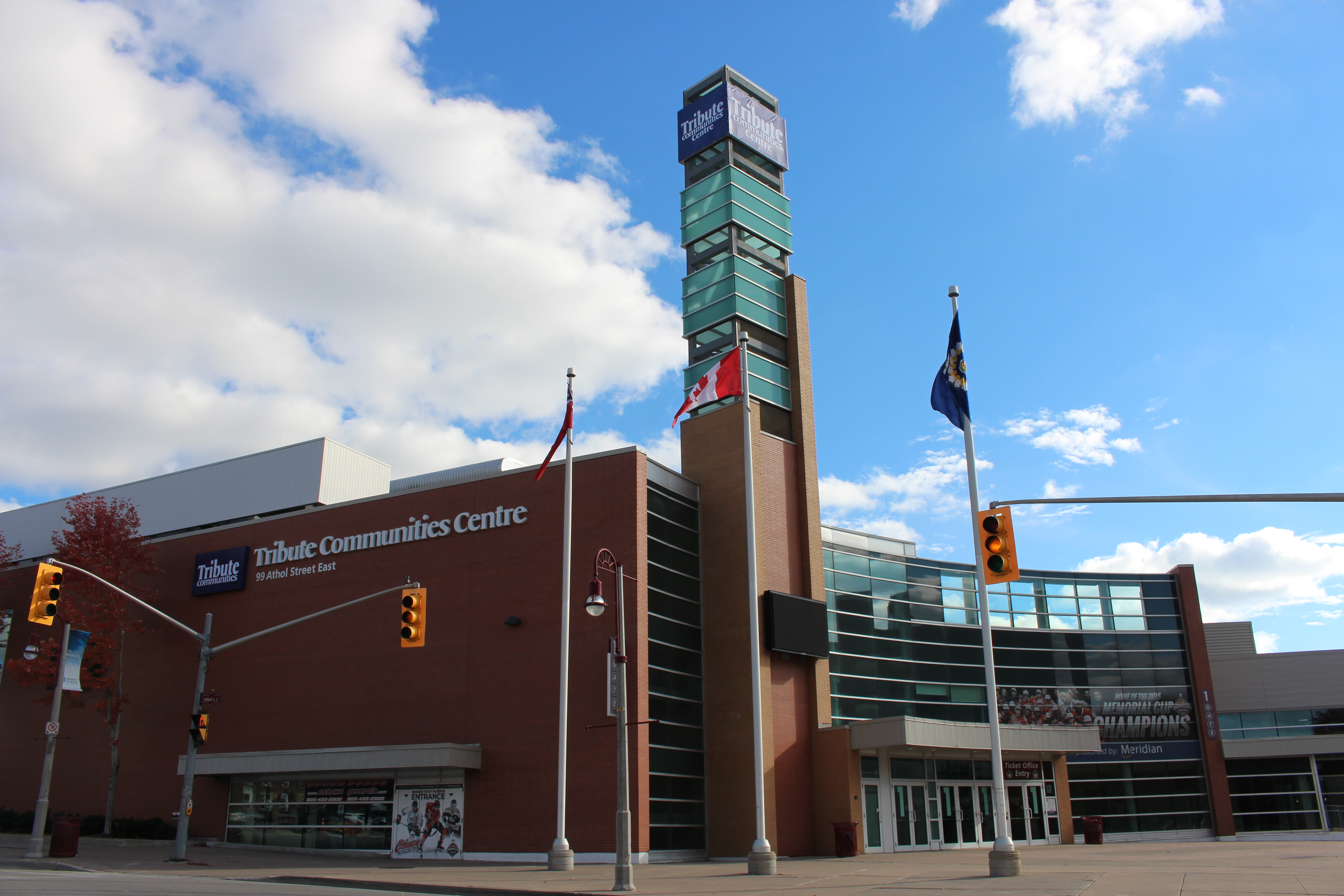
Tribute Communities Centre in 2016

On March 10, 2005, Oshawa City Council approved what was then known as the "Downtown Sports & Entertainment Facility Project" after many years of waiting for a new arena. Groundbreaking for the new facility at the corner of Athol and Mary Streets in downtown Oshawa took place on June 22, 2005. The building is operated by Global Spectrum Facility Management.

On October 5, 2006, the Oshawa Generals announced a naming rights deal which will see the arena named the General Motors Centre. The inaugural game was played November 3, 2006, against the Owen Sound Attack.

On May 15, 2015, the Generals won their 13th J. Ross Robertson Cup at the General Motors Centre, defeating the Erie Otters 4–1.

On November 1, 2016, the General Motors Centre was renamed to the Tribute Communities Centre.

== See also ==
- List of ice hockey teams in Ontario

== Bibliography ==
- Babe Brown, Bobby Attersley, and Bill Kurelo (1978). A History of the Oshawa Generals, Volume One. Chimo Publishing; Toronto, ON, Canada.
- Babe Brown, and Bill Kurelo (1993). A History of the Oshawa Generals, Volume Two. General Printers; Oshawa, ON, Canada.
- Richard M. Lapp and Alex Macaulay (1997) The Memorial Cup: Canada's National Junior Hockey Championship. Harbour Publishing; Madeira Park, BC, Canada.
