= Nick Knott =

Canadian ice hockey player

- Born: July 23, 1920 Kingston, Ontario, Canada
- Died: April 12, 1987 (aged 66) Tulsa, Oklahoma , U.S.
- Height: 6 ft 2 in (188 cm)
- Weight: 200 lb (91 kg; 14 st 4 lb)
- Position: Defence
- Shot: Left
- Played for: Brooklyn Americans
- Playing career: 1940–1950

William Nickolas Earl Knott (July 23, 1920 – April 12, 1987) was a Canadian professional ice hockey player who played 19 games in the National Hockey League for the Brooklyn Americans during the 1941–42 season. He also played several seasons in the United States Hockey League, and retired in 1950. He was born in Kingston, Ontario.

== Career statistics ==
=== Regular season and playoffs ===
			Regular season					Playoffs
Season	Team	League	GP	G	A	Pts	PIM	GP	G	A	Pts	PIM
1938–39	Oshawa Generals	OHA	14	15	7	22	17	7	5	5	10	4
1938–39	Oshawa Generals	M-Cup	—	—	—	—	—	9	11	3	14	22
1939–40	Oshawa Generals	OHA	18	6	17	23	17	7	4	4	8	17
1939–40	Oshawa Generals	M-Cup	—	—	—	—	—	4	2	1	3	13
1940–41	Pittsburgh Hornets	AHL	30	7	11	18	20	6	2	3	5	6
1941–42	Brooklyn Americans	NHL	14	3	1	4	9	—	—	—	—	—
1941–42	Springfield Indians	AHL	38	13	28	41	74	5	0	3	3	2
1942–43	Cornwall Army	QSHL	32	17	26	43	51	6	1	1	2	22
1945–46	Tulsa Oilers	USHL	45	16	21	37	64	8	1	4	5	17
1946–47	Tulsa Oilers	USHL	57	10	29	39	120	5	1	1	2	14
1947–48	Tulsa Oilers	USHL	65	24	28	52	69	2	0	1	1	0
1948–49	Tulsa Oilers	USHL	56	31	24	55	79	6	2	3	5	4
1949–50	Tulsa Oilers	USHL	37	10	14	24	36	—	—	—	—	—
USHL totals			260	91	116	207	368	21	4	9	13	35
NHL totals			14	3	1	4	9	—	—	—	—	—
