= Jonathan Eddolls =

British engineer

- Born: 1 February 1981 (age 45); United Kingdom
- Occupation: Engineer
- Employer: Racing Bulls
- Known for: Formula One engineer
- Title: Head of performance engineering

Jonathan Eddolls (born 1 February 1981) is a British Formula One engineer. He is the head of performance engineering at the Racing Bulls Formula One team.

== Career ==
Eddolls studied mechanical engineering at university, before landing a summer internship at Williams Racing. Eddolls greatly impressed the Grove outfit, so was offered a full time position as a graduate engineer where he rotated between departments. Eventually Eddolls focused on data and performance engineering becoming performance engineer to Nico Rosberg in 2006, working for the German driver in his debut years with Williams until he departed at the end of 2009. He then became Rubens Barrichello's performance engineer for 2010 and 2011 and then provided the same role to Bruno Senna in 2012. In 2013 he was promoted to race engineer to Valtteri Bottas and although their first season was disappointing, they proved to be a great team from 2014 to 2016 as Bottas recorded multiple podiums and finished in the top six in both 2014 and 2015. In 2017 Eddolls left Williams for Toro Rosso to seek a new challenge as head of trackside engineering, he remained with the team when it evolved into Scuderia AlphaTauri at the start of 2020, and later as Racing Bulls in 2023. In 2025, following the promotion of Mattia Spini to Chief Race Engineer, Eddolls transitioned into a more senior performance-focused leadership role within the team, overseeing race engineering coordination and broader trackside performance operations.
