= Ken Davies (ice hockey) =

Canadian ice hockey player

- Born: August 10, 1922; Bowmanville, Ontario, Canada
- Died: November 11, 2004 (aged 82)
- Height: 5 ft 6 in (168 cm)
- Weight: 160 lb (73 kg; 11 st 6 lb)
- Position: Centre
- Shot: Left
- Played for: New York Rangers
- Playing career: 1942–1961

Kenneth George "Buck" Davies (August 10, 1922 – November 11, 2004) was a Canadian ice hockey player, who played center. He played one game in the National Hockey League a playoff game with the New York Rangers on April 4, 1948 against the Detroit Red Wings. The rest of his career, which lasted from 1942 to 1961, was spent in the minor leagues. Davies was born in Bowmanville, Ontario.

== Career statistics ==
=== Regular season and playoffs ===
			Regular season					Playoffs
Season	Team	League	GP	G	A	Pts	PIM	GP	G	A	Pts	PIM
1941–42	Oshawa Generals	OHA	24	17	21	38	2	12	9	6	15	4
1941–42	Oshawa Generals	M-Cup	—	—	—	—	—	11	6	6	12	6
1942–43	Toronto Army Daggers	OHA Sr	10	1	3	4	2	—	—	—	—	—
1944–45	Toronto Army Shamrocks	TIHL	30	14	15	29	15	4	3	3	6	2
1944–45	Toronto Army Daggers	TNDHL	5	6	4	10	0	3	3	4	7	2
1944–45	Toronto Army Daggers	OHA Sr	4	3	0	3	2	—	—	—	—	—
1945–46	Toronto Maher Jewels	TIHL	31	18	21	39	13	10	6	13	19	4
1946–47	St. Paul Saints	USHL	58	19	45	64	26	—	—	—	—	—
1947–48	New Haven Ramblers	AHL	67	29	43	72	35	4	0	1	1	9
1947–48	New York Rangers	NHL	—	—	—	—	—	1	0	0	0	0
1948–49	New Haven Ramblers	AHL	67	32	26	58	20	—	—	—	—	—
1949–50	Providence Reds	AHL	51	13	22	35	10	1	0	0	0	0
1950–51	Providence Reds	AHL	62	12	30	42	14	—	—	—	—	—
1951–52	Providence Reds	AHL	22	7	14	21	10	—	—	—	—	—
1951–52	Cleveland Barons	AHL	42	12	34	46	16	5	1	0	1	4
1952–53	Buffalo Bisons	AHL	59	9	20	29	25	—	—	—	—	—
1953–54	Providence Reds	AHL	56	22	27	49	26	—	—	—	—	—
1954–55	Providence Reds	AHL	56	17	32	49	42	—	—	—	—	—
1955–56	Providence Reds	AHL	34	12	14	26	40	9	2	1	3	0
1956–57	Providence Reds	AHL	60	18	25	43	76	5	0	0	0	0
1957–58	Providence Reds	AHL	58	7	15	22	33	1	0	0	0	)
1958–59	Washington Presidents	EHL	48	17	31	48	34	—	—	—	—	—
1959–60	Washington Presidents	EHL	64	27	36	63	40	—	—	—	—	—
1960–61	Philadelphia Ramblers	EHL	62	12	34	46	17	2	0	0	0	0
AHL totals			634	190	302	492	347	25	3	2	5	17
NHL totals			—	—	—	—	—	1	0	0	0	0

== See also ==
- List of players who played only one game in the NHL
