= Jim Drummond =

Canadian ice hockey player

- Born: October 20, 1918 Toronto, Ontario, Canada
- Died: December 12, 1950 (aged 32) Peterborough, Ontario, Canada
- Height: 5 ft 9 in (175 cm)
- Weight: 170 lb (77 kg; 12 st 2 lb)
- Position: Defence
- Shot: Left
- Played for: New York Rangers
- Playing career: 1939–1949

James Henry Drummond (October 20, 1918 – December 12, 1950) was a Canadian ice hockey defenceman who was born in Toronto, Ontario, Canada. He played 2 games in the National Hockey League (NHL) for the New York Rangers during the 1944–45 season. The rest of his career, which lasted from 1939 to 1949, was spent in the minor leagues.

== Biography ==
Drummond played junior hockey with the Toronto Marlboros and Oshawa Generals, with which he won the 1939 Memorial Cup. Drummond next moved on to senior hockey with the Toronto Goodyears, Toronto Marlboros senior team, and other senior teams in the Toronto area. Drummond enlisted during World War II, and prior to shipping overseas played for military teams in Cornwall, Ontario.

Drummond returned after the war and signed with the New York Rangers. He got into two games with the New York Rangers in the 1944–45 season, but spent his professional career with minor league teams Hershey Bears, New York Rovers, Cleveland Barons and Philadelphia Rockets before retiring from hockey in 1949 due to illness. He succumbed to the illness in the hospital in Peterborough, Ontario in 1950, aged 32.

== Career statistics ==
=== Regular season and playoffs ===
			Regular season					Playoffs
Season	Team	League	GP	G	A	Pts	PIM	GP	G	A	Pts	PIM
1937–38	Toronto Marlboros	OHA	12	3	5	8	8	6	0	4	4	6
1938–39	Oshawa Generals	OHA	14	7	12	19	14	7	1	2	3	5
1938–39	Oshawa G-Men	OHA Sr	1	0	0	0	0	—	—	—	—	—
1938–39	Oshawa Generals	M-Cup	—	—	—	—	—	9	5	8	13	14
1939–40	Toronto Goodyears	OHA Sr	28	5	13	18	18	7	0	1	1	4
1939–40	Toronto Red Indians	TIHL	1	0	0	0	0	—	—	—	—	—
1939–40	Toronto RCAF	TMHL	6	3	3	6	4	3	1	2	3	2
1939–40	Toronto Goodyears	Al-Cup	—	—	—	—	—	4	0	0	0	2
1940–41	Toronto Marlboros	OHA Sr	30	8	8	16	18	10	0	0	0	11
1940–41	Toronto RCAF	TMHL	6	3	3	6	4	3	1	2	3	2
1940–41	Toronto Marlboros	Al-Cup	—	—	—	—	—	7	0	1	1	6
1941–42	Cornwall Flyers	QSHL	37	3	11	14	36	5	0	0	0	0
1942–43	Cornwall Army	QSHL	27	5	6	11	16	6	0	0	0	4
1944–45	New York Rangers	NHL	2	0	0	0	0	—	—	—	—	—
1944–45	New York Rovers	EAHL	12	2	5	7	7	—	—	—	—	—
1944–45	Toronto Orphans	TMHL	4	1	1	2	5	—	—	—	—	—
1944–45	Hershey Bears	AHL	24	1	4	5	4	11	3	2	5	2
1945–46	Hershey Bears	AHL	55	4	11	15	16	3	0	1	1	0
1946–47	Cleveland Barons	AHL	53	5	17	22	26	4	0	0	0	2
1947–48	Philadelphia Rockets	AHL	23	4	7	11	10	—	—	—	—	—
1948–49	Philadelphia Rockets	AHL	24	0	6	6	15	—	—	—	—	—
AHL totals			179	14	45	59	71	18	3	3	6	4
NHL totals			2	0	0	0	0	—	—	—	—	—
