= Hambly Arena =

Former indoor ice rink in Ontario, Canada

- Oshawa Arena
- Interactive map of Hambly Arena
- Address: 140 Bond Street West
- Location: Oshawa, Ontario, Canada
- Coordinates: 43°53′52″N 78°52′12″W
- Owner: Hambly Family
- Seating type: Wooden benches
- Capacity: 3,750 (seated); 5,000 (standing)
- Surface: Artificial ice 194 feet x 85 feet

Construction
- Groundbreaking: 1929
- Opened: 1930
- Closed: 1953
- Demolished: 1953
- Cost: $100,000

Tenants
- Oshawa Majors (1930–1936); Oshawa Generals (1937–1953)

The Hambly Arena was an indoor ice rink in Oshawa, Ontario, also known as the Oshawa Arena. It operated from 1930 to 1953, and was primarily used as an ice hockey venue for the Oshawa Generals. The Hambly Arena was built as a replacement to the wooden Bradley Arena, which burned down in 1928. The Hambly Arena was located at the northeast corner of Bond Street West and Arena Street, beside the Oshawa Creek and south of Kinsmen Stadium.

The construction of the Oshawa Arena was led by the Hambly brothers, Ernie and Harold, who teamed up with Samuel McLaughlin, Paul Clark, and the Ontario Hockey Association to complete the arena. The Hamblys were local businessmen, who ran the Coca-Cola bottler and distributor in Oshawa, and McLaughlin was the founder of the McLaughlin Motor Car Company. Construction began during the Great Depression in October 1929, and was finished in January 1930, with an estimated cost of $100,000. The arena was designed with steel roof trusses to provide an unobstructed view of an artificial ice surface that was 194 feet by 85 feet. The arena sat 3,750, and held 5,000 including standing room.

The Oshawa Majors began play in 1930, and the team was reborn as the Oshawa Generals in 1937. While playing at the Hambly Arena, the Generals won seven consecutive J. Ross Robertson Cup titles, and three Memorial Cup championships from 1937 to 1944.

The Hambly Arena burned to the ground on the morning of September 15, 1953. When the fire was extinguished, the only remains were parts of the brick facade and twisted steel, in a pile of rubble. The estimated loss was about $350,000, only partially covered by insurance. The Generals lost all of their equipment and uniforms in the fire. Due to the financial losses, and since the fire occurred only one week before the season was scheduled to begin, players were dispersed and team operations put on hiatus.

The former site of the arena was occupied by a car dealership in 1955. The Oshawa Civic Auditorium opened as the city's new primary hockey venue in 1964.
