= Paul Theriault =

Canadian ice hockey coach (1950–2024)

- Born: 1950; Sault Ste. Marie, Ontario, Canada
- Died: January 3, 2024 (aged 73)
- Occupation: Ice hockey coach

Paul Theriault (1950 – January 3, 2024) was a Canadian ice hockey coach. He served as an assistant coach in the National Hockey League with the Buffalo Sabres during the 1996–97 NHL season.

Theriault was the longest-serving coach in the history of the Oshawa Generals of the Ontario Hockey League (OHL). He also served as an OHL head coach for both the Erie Otters and Sault Ste. Marie Greyhounds. Theriault was awarded the 1986–87 Matt Leyden Trophy as the OHL Coach of the Year.

At the professional level, Theriault was an assistant coach with the Buffalo Sabres during the 1996–97 NHL season when Ted Nolan won the Jack Adams Award as the NHL's Coach of the Year. He had also served as head coach for the Flint Spirits of the International Hockey League and the HC Asiago HC Alleghe and HC Varese of the Italian Serie A.

Theriault died on January 3, 2024, at the age of 73.

== Post-concussion syndrome ==
Theriault suffered from the debilitating effects of post-concussion syndrome resulting from when he was an NCAA player with the Lake Superior State Lakers men's ice hockey team from 1968 to 1971.

== Awards and honours ==
Award	Year
Matt Leyden Trophy – OHL Coach of the Year	1986–87
