= Billy Taylor (ice hockey, born 1919) =

Canadian ice hockey player in the NHL from 1939 to 1948

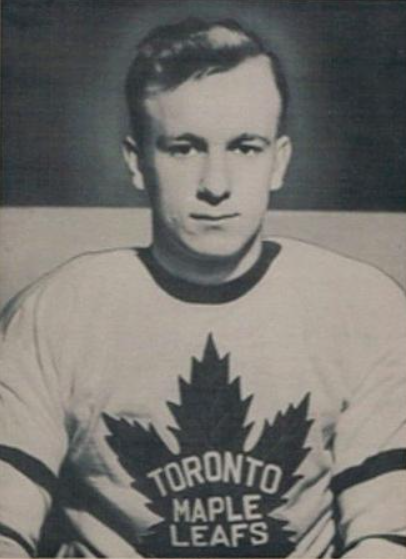
- Taylor in 1939 card
- Born: May 3, 1919 Winnipeg, Manitoba, Canada
- Died: June 12, 1990 (aged 71) Key West, Florida, U.S.
- Height: 5 ft 9 in (175 cm)
- Weight: 150 lb (68 kg; 10 st 10 lb)
- Position: Centre
- Shot: Right
- Played for: NHL; Toronto Maple Leafs; Boston Bruins; Detroit Red Wings; New York Rangers; IAHL; Pittsburgh Hornets; IHL; Chatham Maroons; Grand Rapids Rockets
- Playing career: 1939–1953

William James Taylor (May 3, 1919 – June 12, 1990) was a Canadian professional ice hockey player in the National Hockey League (NHL) from 1939 to 1948.

== Playing career ==
Taylor began his NHL career with the Toronto Maple Leafs in 1939–40. He played in Toronto for five seasons, and won the Stanley Cup in 1942 before being traded to the Detroit Red Wings for Harry Watson at the start of the 1946–47 season. While in Detroit, he set an NHL record for most assists in one game (7) against the Chicago Black Hawks. Wayne Gretzky has since matched that record. After only one season in Motown, he was dealt to the Boston Bruins for his last NHL season, 1947–48. That last season saw him play 39 games for the Bruins and two games for the Rangers. His career was cut short when Clarence Campbell expelled him and Don Gallinger for gambling violations similar to the Black Sox scandal in baseball. The suspension was lifted in 1970.

Taylor was finally reinstated by the NHL in 1970. In 323 career regular season games, he scored 87 goals and 267 points. His son, also named Billy Taylor, also played professional hockey.

== Career statistics ==
			Regular season					Playoffs
Season	Team	League	GP	G	A	Pts	PIM	GP	G	A	Pts	PIM
1935–36	St. Michael's Buzzers	Big 10 Jr. B	7	9	9	18	2	11	27	7	34	7
1936–37	Toronto British Consols	TMHL	12	12	14	26	20	6	7	3	10	0
1937–38	Oshawa Generals	OHA-Jr.	12	19	7	26	27	7	8	9	17	10
1937–38	Oshawa Generals	M-Cup	—	—	—	—	—	13	17	19	36	12
1938–39	Oshawa Generals	OHA-Jr.	14	22	31	53	37	7	7	7	14	8
1938–39	Oshawa Sr. Generals	OHA-Sr.	—	—	—	—	—	1	0	0	0	0
1938–39	Oshawa Generals	M-Cup	—	—	—	—	—	9	11	17	28	14
1939–40	Toronto Maple Leafs	NHL	29	4	6	10	9	2	1	0	1	0
1939–40	Pittsburgh Hornets	IAHL	17	14	14	28	11	9	7	5	12	4
1940–41	Toronto Maple Leafs	NHL	47	9	26	35	15	7	0	3	3	5
1941–42	Toronto Maple Leafs	NHL	48	12	26	38	20	13	2	8	10	4
1942–43	Toronto Maple Leafs	NHL	50	18	42	60	2	6	2	2	4	0
1943–44	Toronto Army Daggers	OHA-Sr.	1	0	0	0	5	—	—	—	—	—
1944–45	Newmarket Army	TNDHL	8	12	17	29	4	8	17	15	32	4
1944–45	Toronto Army Shamrocks	TIHL	14	9	11	20	12	1	1	2	3	0
1945–46	Toronto Maple Leafs	NHL	48	23	18	41	14	—	—	—	—	—
1946–47	Detroit Red Wings	NHL	60	17	46	63	35	5	1	5	6	4
1947–48	Boston Bruins	NHL	39	4	16	20	25	—	—	—	—	—
1947–48	New York Rangers	NHL	2	0	0	0	0	—	—	—	—	—
NHL totals			323	87	180	267	120	33	6	18	24	13
