= Frank Bennett (ice hockey) =

Canadian ice hockey player

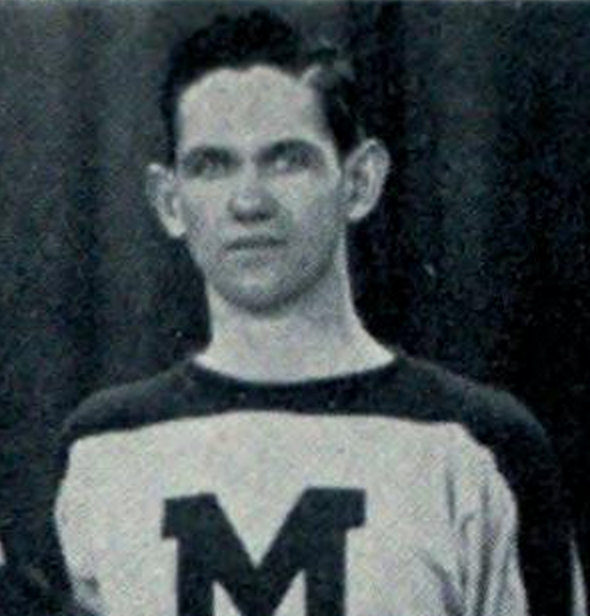
- Bennet with the St. Michael's Buzzers in 1942
- Born: March 4, 1923 Toronto, Ontario, Canada
- Died: June 22, 1996 (aged 73) Ottawa, Ontario, Canada
- Height: 5 ft 11 in (180 cm)
- Weight: 182 lb (83 kg; 13 st 0 lb)
- Position: Left wing/Defence
- Shot: Right
- Played for: Detroit Red Wings
- Playing career: 1942–1948

Francis Joseph Bennett (March 4, 1923 – June 22, 1996) was a Canadian professional ice hockey player who played seven games in the National Hockey League with the Detroit Red Wings during the 1943–44 season. The rest of his career, which lasted from 1942 to 1948, was spent in the minor leagues. Bennett was born in Toronto, Ontario.

== Career statistics ==
=== Regular season and playoffs ===
			Regular season					Playoffs
Season	Team	League	GP	G	A	Pts	PIM	GP	G	A	Pts	PIM
1939–40	St. Michael's Buzzers	HS-ON	6	1	3	4	0	3	1	0	1	0
1940–41	St. Michael's Buzzers	HS-ON	—	—	—	—	—	—	—	—	—	—
1941–42	St. Michael's Majors	OHA	17	9	11	20	10	2	1	1	2	0
1941–42	Toronto Kodiaks	TMHL	8	5	2	7	7	7	1	6	7	0
1942–43	St. Michael's Majors	OHA	20	7	10	17	8	6	3	4	7	4
1942–43	Toronto Staffords	TMHL	18	4	9	13	2	2	0	0	0	2
1942–43	Oshawa Generals	OHA	—	—	—	—	—	9	1	5	6	8
1943–44	Detroit Red Wings	NHL	7	0	1	1	2	—	—	—	—	—
1943–44	Assumption College	MOHL	—	—	—	—	—	—	—	—	—	—
1944–45	Hershey Bears	AHL	3	1	0	1	4	—	—	—	—	—
1944–45	Providence Reds	AHL	52	7	23	30	4	—	—	—	—	—
1945–46	Providence Reds	AHL	3	0	2	2	2	—	—	—	—	—
1945–46	Shawinigan Cataractes	QSHL	38	1	11	12	15	4	0	0	0	2
1946–47	Shawinigan Cataractes	QSHL	40	2	5	7	25	4	1	1	2	0
1947–48	Shawinigan Cataractes	QSHL	19	0	7	7	9	—	—	—	—	—
AHL totals			55	7	25	32	6	—	—	—	—	—
QSHL totals			97	3	23	26	49	8	1	1	2	2
NHL totals			7	0	1	1	2	—	—	—	—	—
