= Wally Wilson (ice hockey) =

Canadian ice hockey player (1921–1995)

- Born: May 25, 1921 Berwick, Nova Scotia, Canada
- Died: August 15, 1995 (aged 74) Clarington, Ontario, Canada
- Height: 6 ft 0 in (183 cm)
- Weight: 170 lb (77 kg; 12 st 2 lb)
- Position: Right wing
- Shot: Right
- Played for: Boston Bruins
- Playing career: 1941–1948

Wallace Lloyd Wilson (May 25, 1921 — August 15, 1995) was a Canadian professional ice hockey player who played 53 games in the National Hockey League with the Boston Bruins during the 1947–48 season. The rest of his career, which lasted from 1941 to 1948, was spent in the minor leagues.

== Career ==
Wilson and his parents moved to Oshawa when he was four. He developed his hockey skills in Oshawa and joined the Oshawa Generals for the 1939–1940 season helping lead them to the Memorial Cup Championship. He turned professional with the Hershey Bears of the American Hockey League in 1941-1942 before joining the Royal Canadian Air Force in 1942 and playing for various R.C.A.F. teams the next four years, and joined the Quebec Aces of the Quebec Senior Hockey League to make an Allen Cup appearance in 1944–1945.

In 1945, he was claimed by the Toronto Maple Leafs of the National Hockey League and played for the Pittsburgh Hornets in the AHL for two seasons, leading them in scoring in the 1945–1946 season. He was then traded to the Boston Bruins of the NHL and played there in 1947–1948, before walking away from the second year of his contract to go into the business world (Cliff Mills Motors) back in Oshawa.

== Career statistics ==
=== Regular season and playoffs ===
			Regular season					Playoffs
Season	Team	League	GP	G	A	Pts	PIM	GP	G	A	Pts	PIM
1939–40	Oshawa Generals	OHA	11	10	9	19	0	15	2	4	6	4
1939–40	Oshawa Generals	M-Cup	—	—	—	—	—	6	8	8	16	2
1940–41	Oshawa Generals	OHA	16	15	7	22	27	12	14	14	28	7
1940–41	Oshawa Generals	M-Cup	—	—	—	—	—	5	0	8	8	6
1941–42	Hershey Bears	AHL	48	16	20	36	8	10	4	1	5	2
1942–43	Toronto RCAF	OHA Sr	10	13	12	25	10	9	3	16	19	18
1942–43	Toronto RCAF	Al-Cup	—	—	—	—	—	4	2	4	6	2
1943–44	Toronto RCAF	OHA Sr	11	6	5	11	2	—	—	—	—	—
1944–45	Quebec Aces	QSHL	3	5	0	5	4	3	1	5	6	0
1944–45	Quebec Aces	Al-Cup	—	—	—	—	—	3	3	1	4	2
1945–46	Pittsburgh Hornets	AHL	57	34	41	75	32	5	4	6	10	2
1946–47	Pittsburgh Hornets	AHL	51	21	30	51	38	12	5	5	10	8
1947–48	Boston Bruins	NHL	53	11	8	19	18	1	0	0	0	0
AHL totals			167	71	91	162	78	27	13	12	25	12
NHL totals			53	11	8	19	18	1	0	0	0	0
