= 1952–53 IHL season =

North American ice hockey season

The 1952–53 IHL season was the eighth season of the International Hockey League (IHL), a North American minor professional ice hockey league. Six teams participated in the regular season, and the Cincinnati Mohawks won the Turner Cup.

== Regular season ==
	GP	W	L	T	GF	GA	Pts
Cincinnati Mohawks	60	43	13	4	310	152	90
Troy Bruins	60	34	21	5	264	221	73
Toledo Mercurys	60	32	25	3	210	207	67
Grand Rapids Rockets	60	27	32	1	231	257	55
Fort Wayne Komets	60	20	38	2	182	244	42
Milwaukee Chiefs	60	15	42	3	234	350	33

== Turner Cup-Playoffs ==
Turner Cup Semifinals
1	Cincinnati Mohawks	4
3	Toledo Mercurys	1
2	Troy Bruins	2
4	Grand Rapids Rockets	4

Turner Cup Final
1	Cincinnati Mohawks	4
4	Grand Rapids Rockets	0

== Turner Cup playoffs ==
=== Semifinals ===
Cincinnati Mohawks 4, Toledo Mercurys 1

Game	Date	Visitor	Score	Home	Series	Arena	Attendance
1	March 11	Cincinnati Mohawks	1–2	Toledo Mercurys	1–0	Toledo Sports Arena	1,415
2	March 12	Toledo Mercurys	2–5	Cincinnati Mohawks	1–1	Cincinnati Gardens	2,580
3	March 14	Cincinnati Mohawks	7–2	Toledo Mercurys	2–1	Toledo Sports Arena	2,826
4	March 15	Toledo Mercurys	2–6	Cincinnati Mohawks	3–1	Cincinnati Gardens	3,740
5	March 17	Toledo Mercurys	0–3	Cincinnati Mohawks	4–1	Cincinnati Gardens	2,813

Grand Rapids Rockets 4, Troy Bruins 2

Game	Date	Visitor	Score	Home	Series	Arena	Attendance
1	March 10	Grand Rapids Rockets	3–9	Troy Bruins	1–0	Hobart Arena	1,548
2	March 11	Troy Bruins	2–5	Grand Rapids Rockets	1–1	Stadium Arena	N/A
3	March 14	Troy Bruins	1–6	Grand Rapids Rockets	2–1	Stadium Arena	N/A
4	March 15	Grand Rapids Rockets	2–6	Troy Bruins	2–2	Hobart Arena	3,256
5	March 18	Troy Bruins	0–2	Grand Rapids Rockets	3–2	Stadium Arena	N/A
6	March 21	Troy Bruins	3–6	Grand Rapids Rockets	4–2	Stadium Arena	N/A

=== Turner Cup Finals ===
Cincinnati Mohawks 4, Grand Rapids Rockets 0

Game	Date	Visitor	Score	Home	Series	Arena	Attendance
1	March 24	Grand Rapids Rockets	3–5	Cincinnati Mohawks	1–0	Cincinnati Gardens	2,872
2	March 26	Cincinnati Mohawks	7–3	Grand Rapids Rockets	2–0	Stadium Arena	2,650
3	March 28	Grand Rapids Rockets	3–6	Cincinnati Mohawks	3–0	Cincinnati Gardens	6,042
4	March 31	Cincinnati Mohawks	8–4	Grand Rapids Rockets	4–0	Stadium Arena	N/A

== Awards ==
Award Name	Accomplishment	Player	Team
James Gatschene Memorial Trophy	Most Valuable Player	Don Marshall	Cincinnati Mohawks
George H. Wilkinson Trophy	Top Scorer	Alexander Irving	Milwaukee Chiefs

== Coaches ==
- Cincinnati Mohawks: Buddy O'Connor
- Fort Wayne Komets: Alex Wood
- Grand Rapids Rockets: Louis Trudel
- Milwaukee Chiefs: Ed Bruneteau
- Toledo Mercurys: Doug McCaig
- Troy Bruins: Norm McAtee
