= 1939 Memorial Cup =

Canadian junior ice hockey championship

The Memorial Cup trophy

The 1939 Memorial Cup final was the 21st junior ice hockey championship of the Canadian Amateur Hockey Association. The George Richardson Memorial Trophy champions Oshawa Generals of the Ontario Hockey Association in Eastern Canada competed against the Abbott Cup champions Edmonton Athletic Club Roamers of the Edmonton Junior Hockey League in Western Canada. In a best-of-five series, held at Maple Leaf Gardens in Toronto, Ontario, Oshawa won their 1st Memorial Cup, defeating Edmonton 3 games to 1.

== Scores ==
- Game 1: Oshawa 9-4 Edmonton
- Game 2: Oshawa 12-4 Edmonton
- Game 3: Edmonton 4-1 Oshawa
- Game 4: Oshawa 4-2 Edmonton

== Winning roster ==
Les Colvin, Don Daniels, Joe Delmonte, Jim Drummond, Gerry Kinsella, Nick Knott, Jud McAtee, Norm McAtee, Dinny McManus, Gar Peters, Nig Ritchie, Roy Sawyer, Orville Smith, Billy Taylor. Coach: Tracy Shaw.
