= 1940 Memorial Cup =

Canadian junior ice hockey championship

The Memorial Cup trophy

The 1940 Memorial Cup final was the 22nd junior ice hockey championship of the Canadian Amateur Hockey Association. The George Richardson Memorial Trophy champions Oshawa Generals of the Ontario Hockey Association in Eastern Canada competed against the Abbott Cup champions Kenora Thistles of the Manitoba Junior Hockey League in Western Canada. In a best-of-five series, held at Shea's Amphitheatre in Winnipeg, Manitoba, Oshawa won their 2nd and consecutive Memorial Cup, defeating Kenora 3 games to 1.

== Scores ==
- Game 1: Oshawa 1-0 Kenora
- Game 2: Oshawa 4-1 Kenora
- Game 3: Kenora 4-3 Oshawa
- Game 4: Oshawa 4-2 Kenora

== Winning roster ==
Don Daniels, Frank Eddolls, Jack Hewson, Bud Hellyer, Nick Knott, Jud McAtee, Norm McAtee, Dinny McManus, Gar Peters, Nig Ritchie, Roy Sawyer, Orville Smith, Doug Turner, Ron Wilson, Wally Wilson. Coach: Tracy Shaw
