= Mattia Spini =

Italian engineer

- Citizenship: Italian
- Education: University of Florence, University of Pisa
- Occupation: Engineer
- Employer: Racing Bulls
- Title: Head of trackside engineering

Mattia Spini is an Italian Formula One engineer. He is the Head of Trackside Engineering at the Racing Bulls Formula One team. He previously was race engineer to Yuki Tsunoda, Daniil Kvyat and Pierre Gasly.

== Career ==
Spini studied mechanical engineering at the University of Florence before completing a master's degree in Vehicle Engineering at the University of Pisa. He began his motorsports career at Scuderia Toro Rosso in 2012 as a Vehicle Dynamics Engineer, contributing to the development of multi-body simulation models and supporting early driver-in-the-loop simulator activities. He moved into a dedicated DIL Simulator Engineer role in 2013, leading simulator operations and supporting race and test programmes for drivers including Daniel Ricciardo, Jean-Éric Vergne, Daniil Kvyat and Max Verstappen.

In 2016 Spini transitioned to a trackside Performance Engineer position, working with Carlos Sainz, where he focused on car set-up, data analysis and performance optimisation during race weekends. He was promoted to Race Engineer in 2018, working with Pierre Gasly, overseeing the Frenchman's race execution, strategy implementation and performance development. For 2019, Spini engineered Kvyat on his return to Formula One and remained with the Russian for 2020 in the rebranded Scuderia Alpha Tauri team. In 2021 he was partnered with rookie Yuki Tsunoda engineering the Japanese driver until the 2024 Italian Grand Prix when Spini was promoted to Chief Race Engineer with the team now called Racing Bulls.

As Chief Race Engineer Spini was responsible for coordinating engineering operations across both cars and acting as a key interface between the race team and factory-based performance groups. In 2026 he was appointed Head of Trackside Engineering, assuming overall responsibility for the organisation and delivery of trackside engineering activities, including race engineering direction, operational planning, and performance integration between circuit and factory.
