= Les Colvin =

Canadian ice hockey player

- Born: February 8, 1919 Oshawa, Ontario, Canada
- Died: September 7, 2006 (aged 87) Bowmanville, Ontario, Canada
- Height: 5 ft 6 in (168 cm)
- Weight: 150 lb (68 kg; 10 st 10 lb)
- Position: Goaltender
- Caught: Left
- Played for: Boston Bruins
- Playing career: 1939–1953

Leslie Charles Colvin (February 8, 1919 – September 7, 2006) was a Canadian ice hockey goaltender who played in one National Hockey League game for the Boston Bruins during the 1948–49 season, on January 22, 1949 against the Montreal Canadiens. The rest of his career, which lasted from 1939 to 1953, was spent in various minor leagues.

== Career statistics ==
=== Regular season and playoffs ===
			Regular season								Playoffs
Season	Team	League	GP	W	L	T	MIN	GA	SO	GAA	GP	W	L	MIN	GA	SO	GAA
1936–37	Oshawa Generals	OHA	1	—	—	—	60	4	0	4.00	—	—	—	—	—	—	—
1937–38	Oshawa Generals	OHA	4	—	—	—	240	20	1	5.00	—	—	—	—	—	—	—
1938–39	Oshawa Generals	OHA	7	—	—	—	420	8	1	1.14	4	4	0	240	7	1	1.75
1939–40	Washington Eagles	EAHL	23	—	—	—	1380	79	0	3.43	3	1	2	180	11	0	3.67
1940–41	Washington Eagles	EAHL	27	—	—	—	1620	74	0	2.74	1	—	—	60	3	0	3.00
1940–41	New York Rovers	EAHL	3	—	—	—	180	11	0	3.67	—	—	—	—	—	—	—
1942–43	Toronto Army Daggers	OHA Sr	1	0	1	0	60	8	0	8.00	—	—	—	—	—	—	—
1946–47	Shawinigan Falls Cataractes	QSHL	10	—	—	—	600	51	0	5.10	4	—	—	240	22	0	5.40
1947–48	Vancouver Canucks	PCHL	50	25	23	2	3000	197	1	3.94	—	—	—	—	—	—	—
1947–48	Los Angeles Monarchs	PCHL	4	1	3	0	240	21	0	4.20	—	—	—	—	—	—	—
1947–48	Portland Eagles	PCHL	1	1	0	0	60	3	0	3.00	—	—	—	—	—	—	—
1948–49	Boston Bruins	NHL	1	0	1	0	60	4	0	4.00	—	—	—	—	—	—	—
1948–49	Shawinigan Falls Cataractes	QSHL	36	—	—	—	—	—	10	1.46	—	—	—	—	—	—	—
1949–50	Moncton Hawks	NBSHL	70	31	32	7	4200	270	3	3.87	4	0	4	250	22	0	5.28
1950–51	Moncton Hawks	NBSHL	69	16	45	5	4060	312	0	4.61	6	1	5	360	22	0	3.67
1951–52	North Bay Trappers	NOHA	18	—	—	—	1080	81	1	4.50	11	—	—	660	42	0	3.82
1952–53	North Bay Trappers	NOHA	47	21	23	2	2820	203	1	4.32	7	—	—	420	28	0	4.00
NHL totals			1	0	1	0	60	4	0	4.00	—	—	—	—	—	—	—

== See also ==
- List of players who played only one game in the NHL
