= Doug McCaig =

Canadian ice hockey player

- Born: February 24, 1919 Guelph, Ontario, Canada
- Died: June 6, 1982 (aged 63)
- Height: 6 ft 0 in (183 cm)
- Weight: 190 lb (86 kg; 13 st 8 lb)
- Position: Defence
- Shot: Right
- Played for: Chicago Black Hawks; Detroit Red Wings
- Playing career: 1939–1956

Douglas Edwin McCaig (February 24, 1919 – June 6, 1982) was a Canadian ice hockey player who played 263 games in the National Hockey League with the Detroit Red Wings and Chicago Black Hawks between 1941 and 1951.

== Career statistics ==
=== Regular season and playoffs ===
			Regular season					Playoffs
Season	Team	League	GP	G	A	Pts	PIM	GP	G	A	Pts	PIM
1939–40	Detroit Holzbaugh	MOHL	34	7	6	13	43	12	1	1	2	18
1940–41	Detroit Holzbaugh	MOHL	11	1	4	5	12	—	—	—	—	—
1940–41	Indianapolis Capitals	AHL	27	1	1	2	14	—	—	—	—	—
1941–42	Detroit Red Wings	NHL	9	0	1	1	6	2	0	0	0	6
1941–42	Indianapolis Capitals	AHL	44	4	8	12	6	10	3	4	7	13
1942–43	Toronto RCAF	TIHL	7	2	4	6	12	8	4	1	5	23
1942–43	Toronto RCAF	Al-Cup	—	—	—	—	—	4	0	1	1	4
1943–44	Toronto RCAF	TIHL	7	1	1	2	16	—	—	—	—	—
1943–44	Brantford RCAF	OHA Sr	—	—	—	—	—	—	—	—	—	—
1944–45	Winnipeg RCAF	WNDHL	10	4	7	11	31	—	—	—	—	—
1945–46	St. Louis Flyers	AHL	19	3	4	7	28	5	0	1	1	12
1945–46	Detroit Red Wings	NHL	6	0	1	1	12	—	—	—	—	—
1945–46	Indianapolis Capitals	AHL	24	1	8	9	27	5	0	1	1	12
1946–47	Detroit Red Wings	NHL	47	2	4	6	62	5	0	1	1	4
1946–47	Indianapolis Capitals	AHL	13	4	2	6	27	—	—	—	—	—
1947–48	Detroit Red Wings	NHL	29	3	3	6	37	—	—	—	—	—
1948–49	Detroit Red Wings	NHL	1	0	0	0	0	—	—	—	—	—
1948–49	Chicago Black Hawks	NHL	55	1	3	4	60	—	—	—	—	—
1949–50	Chicago Black Hawks	NHL	62	0	4	4	49	—	—	—	—	—
1950–51	Chicago Black Hawks	NHL	54	2	5	7	29	—	—	—	—	—
1950–51	Milwaukee Sea Gulls	USHL	6	1	1	2	4	—	—	—	—	—
1951–52	Edmonton Flyers	PCHL	70	4	7	11	148	4	0	0	0	0
1952–53	Toledo Mercurys	IHL	59	7	12	19	73	5	0	0	0	4
1953–54	Toledo Mercurys	IHL	57	4	13	17	52	5	1	1	2	0
1954–55	Toledo Mercurys	IHL	34	1	8	9	25	—	—	—	—	—
1955–56	Fort Wayne Komets	IHL	38	11	15	26	39	—	—	—	—	—
NHL totals			263	8	21	29	255	7	0	1	1	10
