= 1945–46 NHL season =

Professional ice hockey league season

- League: National Hockey League
- Sport: Ice hockey
- Duration: October 24, 1945 – April 9, 1946
- Games: 50
- Teams: 6

Regular season
- Season champion: Montreal Canadiens
- Season MVP: Max Bentley (Black Hawks)
- Top scorer: Max Bentley (Black Hawks)

Stanley Cup
- Champions: Montreal Canadiens
- Runners-up: Boston Bruins

NHL seasons
- ← 1944–45 1946–47 →

The 1945–46 NHL season was the 29th season of the National Hockey League. Six teams played 50 games each. The Montreal Canadiens won the Stanley Cup, defeating the Boston Bruins for the team's sixth championship.

== League business ==
Since World War II had ended, the NHL and the Canadian Amateur Hockey Association (CAHA) reverted to the pre-war agreement not to sign any junior ice hockey players without permission. CAHA secretary George Dudley stated that tryout contracts must be honoured, and junior-aged players on NHL reserve lists must be reinstated as amateurs to return to the CAHA. The wartime practice of the NHL borrowing amateur players for three games or less was discontinued. The NHL and the CAHA discussed updates to the financial terms of the agreement. The NHL offered a flat payment of $20,000 to signing amateurs, which Dudley felt was too low. The CAHA ultimately accepted the lump sum payment, preferring not to break its alliance with the NHL.

Synchronized red lights to signal goals were made obligatory for all NHL rinks.

It was rumoured in the press that Lester Patrick planned to retire as general manager of the New York Rangers. On February 22, 1946, he announced his retirement from the general manager position, however he would stay on as vice president of Madison Square Garden.

The NHL and the International Ice Hockey Association agreed to mutually enforce suspensions for players not fulfilling a tryout contract.

== Regular season ==
Veterans came back to their teams this year, as World War II ended, but many found they could not regain their form. One who did regain his form was the man formerly known as "Mr. Zero"—Boston Bruins' goaltender Frank Brimsek. He was shelled in an 8–3 contest with Chicago, but got better game by game. The Bruins had first place at one point, then finished second. Brimsek made the Second All-Star Team as a result.

Max Bentley of Chicago led the league in scoring, and, because of the "Pony Line" that including him, his brother Doug and Bill Mosienko, the Black Hawks were in first place at one point. But misfortune hit the Hawks when Doug Bentley injured his knee in a January 23 game and the team sagged.

Frank Patrick, former Pacific Coast Hockey Association president and former managing director for the NHL, suffered a heart attack and was not released from the hospital for several weeks.

A bombshell exploded on January 30, 1946, when defenceman Babe Pratt was expelled from the NHL for betting on games. However, he only bet on his own team and appealed his expulsion. On his promise he would not bet on any more games, he was reinstated. Pratt missed 9 games during his suspension.

Maple Leaf Gaye Stewart led the league in goals with 37, but Toronto finished fifth and missed the playoffs for the first time since playing at Maple Leaf Gardens.

Bill Durnan equalled George Hainsworth's record of three consecutive Vezina Trophies and led the league in shutouts with 4.

=== Final standings ===
National Hockey League
		GP	W	L	T	GF	GA	DIFF	Pts
1	Montreal Canadiens	50	28	17	5	172	134	+38	61
2	Boston Bruins	50	24	18	8	167	156	+11	56
3	Chicago Black Hawks	50	23	20	7	200	178	+22	53
4	Detroit Red Wings	50	20	20	10	146	159	−13	50
5	Toronto Maple Leafs	50	19	24	7	174	185	−11	45
6	New York Rangers	50	13	28	9	144	191	−47	35

== Playoffs ==
=== Playoff bracket ===
The top four teams in the league qualified for the playoffs. In the semifinals, the first-place team played the third-place team, while the second-place team faced the fourth-place team, with the winners advancing to the Stanley Cup Finals. In both rounds, teams competed in a best-of-seven series (scores in the bracket indicate the number of games won in each best-of-seven series).

Semifinals
1	Montreal	4
3	Chicago	0
2	Boston	4
4	Detroit	1

Stanley Cup Finals
1	Montreal	4
2	Boston	1

=== Semifinals ===
==== (1) Montreal Canadiens vs. (3) Chicago Black Hawks ====
The Montreal Canadiens finished first in the league with 61 points. The Chicago Blackhawks finished third with 53 points. This was the seventh playoff meeting between these two teams with the teams splitting the six previous series. They last met in the 1944 Stanley Cup Finals where Montreal won in four games. Montreal won this year's ten game regular season series earning eleven of twenty points.

March 19	Chicago Black Hawks	2–6	Montreal Canadiens	Montreal Forum	Recap
George Gee (1) – pp – 17:25		First period	08:33 – Dutch Hiller (1)
No scoring		Second period	08:32 – Elmer Lach (1); 16:29 – pp – Billy Reay (1); 16:48 – pp – Dutch Hiller (2)
Bill Mosienko (1) – pp – 12:22		Third period	10:29 – Toe Blake (1); 14:40 – Maurice Richard (1)
Mike Karakas		Goalie stats	Bill Durnan

March 21	Chicago Black Hawks	1–5	Montreal Canadiens	Montreal Forum	Recap
Clint Smith (1) – 19:13		First period	06:40 – Bob Fillion (1); 09:14 – Jimmy Peters (1); 09:45 – Maurice Richard (2)
No scoring		Second period	10:02 – Ken Mosdell (1)
No scoring		Third period	14:45 – Jimmy Peters (2)
Mike Karakas		Goalie stats	Bill Durnan

March 24	Montreal Canadiens	8–2	Chicago Black Hawks	Chicago Stadium	Recap
Toe Blake (2) – 12:42; Buddy O'Connor (1) – pp – 14:07		First period	15:06 – Max Bentley (1); 18:17 – pp – Clint Smith (2)
Buddy O'Connor (2) – 04:09; Ken Mosdell (2) – 09:31; Murph Chamberlain (1) – 15:36		Second period	No scoring
Toe Blake (3) – 09:40; Maurice Richard (3) – 10:36; Bob Fillion (2) – 14:34		Third period	No scoring
Bill Durnan		Goalie stats	Mike Karakas

March 26	Montreal Canadiens	7–2	Chicago Black Hawks	Chicago Stadium	Recap
Toe Blake (4) – pp – 06:04; Maurice Richard (4) – pp – 12:01		First period	11:26 – Bill Mosienko (2)
Toe Blake (5) – 10:54; Murph Chamberlain (2) – sh – 18:05		Second period	10:27 – Red Hamill (1)
Elmer Lach (2) – 09:55; Toe Blake (6) – pp – 17:33; Ken Reardon (1) – 18:42		Third period	No scoring
Bill Durnan		Goalie stats	Mike Karakas

Montreal wins 4–0

==== (2) Boston Bruins vs. (4) Detroit Red Wings ====
The Boston Bruins finished second in the league with 56 points. The Detroit Red Wings finished fourth with 50 points. This was the fifth playoff meeting between these two teams with Detroit winning the three of the four previous series. They last met in the previous year's Stanley Cup Semifinals where the Red Wings won in seven games. Boston won this year's ten game regular season series earning eleven of twenty points.

March 19	Detroit Red Wings	1–3	Boston Bruins	Boston Garden	Recap
No scoring		First period	03:11 – sh – Pat Egan (1); 19:05 – Bill Shill (1)
Harry Watson (1) – 07:51		Second period	No scoring
No scoring		Third period	11:43 – Bep Guidolin (1)
Harry Lumley		Goalie stats	Frank Brimsek

March 21	Detroit Red Wings	3–0	Boston Bruins	Boston Garden	Recap
Pat Lundy (1) – 07:32; Jim Conacher (1) – 12:58		First period	No scoring
No scoring		Second period	No scoring
Harry Watson (2) – 19:22		Third period	No scoring
Harry Lumley		Goalie stats	Frank Brimsek

March 24	Boston Bruins	5–2	Detroit Red Wings	Olympia Stadium	Recap
Milt Schmidt (1) – 02:50		First period	No scoring
Woody Dumart (1) – 04:51		Second period	No scoring
Pat Egan (2) – 00:25; Milt Schmidt (2) – 01:51; Woody Dumart (2) – 11:10		Third period	12:42 – Fern Gauthier (1); 13:25 – Carl Liscombe (1)
Frank Brimsek		Goalie stats	Harry Lumley

March 26	Boston Bruins	4–1	Detroit Red Wings	Olympia Stadium	Recap
Bobby Bauer (1) – 02:08; Woody Dumart (3) – 14:54		First period	No scoring
No scoring		Second period	No scoring
Bep Guidolin (2) – 04:08; Terry Reardon (1) – 11:30		Third period	11:00 – Fern Gauthier (2)
Frank Brimsek		Goalie stats	Harry Lumley

March 28	Detroit Red Wings	3–4	OT	Boston Bruins	Boston Garden	Recap
No scoring		First period		07:04 – Bep Guidolin (3); 14:03 – pp – Bobby Bauer (2)
Fern Gauthier (3) – 11:00		Second period		No scoring
Adam Brown (1) – 12:55; Eddie Bruneteau (1) – 19:13		Third period		04:24 – Terry Reardon (2)
No scoring		First overtime period		09:51 – Don Gallinger (1)
Harry Lumley		Goalie stats		Frank Brimsek

Boston won series 4–1

=== Stanley Cup Finals ===
This was the fifth playoff meeting between these two teams with the teams splitting the four previous series. They last met in the 1943 Stanley Cup Semifinals where Boston won in five games. Montreal won this year's ten game regular season series earning eleven of twenty points.

March 30	Boston Bruins	3–4	OT	Montreal Canadiens	Montreal Forum	Recap
No scoring		First period		No scoring
Bep Guidolin (4) – 05:09; Woody Dumart (4) – 08:02		Second period		00:21 – pp – Butch Bouchard (1); 03:19 – Bob Fillion (3)
Jack Crawford (1) – 14:04		Third period		16:23 – Murph Chamberlain (3)
No scoring		First overtime period		09:08 – Maurice Richard (5)
Frank Brimsek		Goalie stats		Bill Durnan

April 2	Boston Bruins	2–3	OT	Montreal Canadiens	Montreal Forum	Recap
Pat Egan (3) – 10:55		First period		01:06 – Elmer Lach (3)
Bobby Bauer (3) – 03:04		Second period		No scoring
No scoring		Third period		10:10 – Butch Bouchard (2)
No scoring		First overtime period		16:55 – Jimmy Peters (3)
Frank Brimsek		Goalie stats		Bill Durnan

April 4	Montreal Canadiens	4–2	Boston Bruins	Boston Garden	Recap
Elmer Lach (4) – 10:14; Glen Harmon (1) – pp – 14:13		First period	11:01 – Bep Guidolin (5)
No scoring		Second period	18:41 – Terry Reardon (3)
Ken Mosdell (3) – 02:45; Dutch Hiller (3) – 05:18		Third period	No scoring
Bill Durnan		Goalie stats	Frank Brimsek

April 7	Montreal Canadiens	2–3	OT	Boston Bruins	Boston Garden	Recap
No scoring		First period		No scoring
Maurice Richard (6) – 13:46		Second period		08:05 – Murray Henderson (1)
Maurice Richard (7) – 04:04		Third period		03:01 – Don Gallinger (2)
No scoring		First overtime period		15:13 – Terry Reardon (4)
Bill Durnan		Goalie stats		Frank Brimsek

April 9	Boston Bruins	3–6	Montreal Canadiens	Montreal Forum	Recap
Bill Cowley (1) – p – 05:42; Bobby Bauer (4) – 14:01		First period	09:55 – Bob Fillion (4); 15:51 – Elmer Lach (5); 18:28 – Ken Mosdell (4)
Milt Schmidt (3) – 07:15		Second period	No scoring
No scoring		Third period	11:06 – Toe Blake (7); 14:05 – Murph Chamberlain (4); 17:13 – Dutch Hiller (4)
Frank Brimsek		Goalie stats	Bill Durnan

Montreal won series 4–1

== Awards ==
The NHL changed the criteria for the Vezina Trophy to award it to the goaltender who plays the most games for the team which gives up the fewest goals in the season.

Award winners
O'Brien Cup: (Stanley Cup runner-up)	Boston Bruins
Prince of Wales Trophy: (Regular season champion)	Montreal Canadiens
Calder Memorial Trophy: (Best first-year player)	Edgar Laprade, New York Rangers
Hart Trophy: (Most valuable player)	Max Bentley, Chicago Black Hawks
Lady Byng Trophy: (Excellence and sportsmanship)	Toe Blake, Montreal Canadiens
Vezina Trophy: (Goaltender of team with lowest GAA)	Bill Durnan, Montreal Canadiens

All-Star teams
First team	Position	Second team
Bill Durnan, Montreal Canadiens	G	Frank Brimsek, Boston Bruins
Jack Crawford, Boston Bruins	D	Ken Reardon, Montreal Canadiens
Emile "Butch" Bouchard, Montreal Canadiens	D	Jack Stewart, Detroit Red Wings
Max Bentley, Chicago Black Hawks	C	Elmer Lach, Montreal Canadiens
Maurice Richard, Montreal Canadiens	RW	Bill Mosienko, Chicago Black Hawks
Gaye Stewart, Toronto Maple Leafs	LW	Toe Blake, Montreal Canadiens
Dick Irvin, Montreal Canadiens	Coach	Johnny Gottselig, Chicago Black Hawks

== Player statistics ==
=== Scoring leaders ===
Note: GP = Games played, G = Goals, A = Assists, PTS = Points, PIM = Penalties in minutes

Player	Team	GP	G	A	Pts	PIM
Max Bentley	Chicago Black Hawks	47	31	30	61	6
Gaye Stewart	Toronto Maple Leafs	50	37	15	52	8
Toe Blake	Montreal Canadiens	50	29	21	50	2
Clint Smith	Chicago Black Hawks	50	26	24	50	2
Maurice Richard	Montreal Canadiens	50	27	22	49	50
Bill Mosienko	Chicago Black Hawks	40	18	30	48	12
Ab DeMarco	New York Rangers	50	20	27	47	20
Elmer Lach	Montreal Canadiens	50	13	34	47	34
Alex Kaleta	Chicago Black Hawks	49	19	27	46	17
Billy Taylor	Toronto Maple Leafs	48	23	18	41	14

Source: NHL

=== Leading goaltenders ===
Note: GP = Games played; Min – Minutes played; GA = Goals against; GAA = Goals against average; W = Wins; L = Losses; T = Ties; SO = Shutouts

Player	Team	GP	MIN	GA	GAA	W	L	T	SO
Bill Durnan	Montreal Canadiens	40	2400	104	2.60	24	11	5	4
Harry Lumley	Detroit Red Wings	50	3000	159	3.18	20	20	10	2
Frank Brimsek	Boston Bruins	34	2040	111	3.26	16	14	4	2
Mike Karakas	Chicago Black Hawks	48	2880	166	3.46	22	19	7	1
Turk Broda	Toronto Maple Leafs	15	900	53	3.53	6	6	3	0
Frank McCool	Toronto Maple Leafs	22	1320	81	3.68	10	9	3	0
Chuck Rayner	New York Rangers	40	2377	149	3.76	12	21	7	1
Jim Henry	New York Rangers	11	623	42	4.04	1	7	2	1

== Coaches ==
- Boston Bruins: Dit Clapper
- Chicago Black Hawks: Johnny Gottselig
- Detroit Red Wings: Jack Adams
- Montreal Canadiens: Dick Irvin
- New York Rangers: Frank Boucher
- Toronto Maple Leafs: Hap Day

== Debuts ==
The following is a list of players of note who played their first NHL game in 1945–46 (listed with their first team, asterisk(*) marks debut in playoffs):

- Leo Reise Jr., Chicago Black Hawks
- George Gee, Chicago Black Hawks
- Jimmy Peters, Montreal Canadiens
- Cal Gardner, New York Rangers
- Edgar Laprade, New York Rangers
- Tony Leswick, New York Rangers
- Jimmy Thomson, Toronto Maple Leafs

== Last games ==
The following is a list of players of note that played their last game in the NHL in 1945–46 (listed with their last team):

- Herb Cain, Boston Bruins (Last active Montreal Maroons player)
- Mike Karakas, Chicago Black Hawks
- Carl Liscombe, Detroit Red Wings
- Earl Seibert, Detroit Red Wings
- Flash Hollett, Detroit Red Wings (Last active Ottawa Senators player)
- Mud Bruneteau, Detroit Red Wings
- Syd Howe, Detroit Red Wings (last active Philadelphia Quakers player)
- Ott Heller, New York Rangers
- Lynn Patrick, New York Rangers
- Frank McCool, Toronto Maple Leafs
- Bob Davidson, Toronto Maple Leafs
- Sweeney Schriner, Toronto Maple Leafs
- Lorne Carr, Toronto Maple Leafs
- Mel Hill, Toronto Maple Leafs

== See also ==
- 1945–46 NHL transactions
- List of Stanley Cup champions
- 1945 in sports
- 1946 in sports
