= Milwaukee Chiefs (ice hockey) =

- City: Milwaukee
- League: International Hockey League
- Operated: 1952–1954

The Milwaukee Chiefs were a minor league professional ice hockey team in the International Hockey League from 1952 to 1954.

== Season-by-season results ==
Season	Games	Won	Lost	Tied	Points	Goals for	Goals against	Coach
1952–53	60	15	42	3	33	234	350	Modere Bruneteau
1953–54	64	13	48	3	29	187	343	Louis Trudel
