= 2000–01 IHL season =

North American ice hockey season

2000-01 IHL season
- League: International Hockey League
- Sport: Ice hockey
- Duration: October 6, 2000 – May 26, 2001
- Number of games: 82
- Number of teams: 11

Regular season
- Fred A. Huber Trophy: Grand Rapids Griffins
- Season MVP: Norm Maracle (Solar Bears)
- Top scorer: Steve Larouche (Wolves); Derek King (Griffins)

Playoffs
- Playoffs MVP: Norm Maracle (Solar Bears)

Turner Cup
- Champions: Orlando Solar Bears
- Runners-up: Chicago Wolves

Seasons
- ← 1999–2000

The 2000–01 IHL season was the 56th and final season of the International Hockey League, a North American minor professional league. Eleven teams participated in the regular season, and the Orlando Solar Bears won their first Turner Cup. Following the season, six teams (Admirals, Aeros, Griffins, Grizzles, Moose and Wolves) joined the American Hockey League as expansion teams. The Cyclones rejoined the East Coast Hockey League where they had previously played from 1990 to 1992. The remaining teams ceased operations.

== Regular season ==
=== Eastern Conference ===
	GP	W	L	SOL	GF	GA	Pts
Grand Rapids Griffins (OTT)	82	53	22	7	279	196	113
Orlando Solar Bears (ATL)	82	47	28	7	241	193	101
Cincinnati Cyclones (CAR)	82	44	29	9	267	258	97
Cleveland Lumberjacks (MIN)	82	43	32	7	270	258	93
Milwaukee Admirals (NSH)	82	42	33	7	244	217	91
Detroit Vipers (TBL)	82	23	53	6	184	311	52

=== Western Conference ===
	GP	W	L	SOL	GF	GA	Pts
Chicago Wolves (NYI)	82	43	32	7	267	249	93
Houston Aeros	82	42	32	8	229	245	92
Manitoba Moose (DET)	82	39	31	12	222	230	90
Utah Grizzlies (DAL)	82	38	36	8	208	220	84
Kansas City Blades (VAN)	82	37	42	3	239	273	77

== Turner Cup Playoffs ==
Turner Cup-Quarterfinals
E1	Grand Rapids	4
E4	Cleveland	0
Eastern Conference
E2	Orlando	4
E3	Cincinnati	1
W1	Chicago	4
E5	Milwaukee	1
Western Conference
W2	Houston	3
W3	Manitoba	4

Turner Cup-Semifinals
E1	Grand Rapids	2
E2	Orlando	4
W1	Chicago	4
W3	Manitoba	2

Turner Cup-Final
E2	Orlando	4
W1	Chicago	1

=== Quarterfinals ===
==== (E1) Grand Rapids Griffins vs. (E4) Cleveland Lumberjacks ====
April 20	Cleveland Lumberjacks	1–5	Grand Rapids Griffins	Van Andel Arena

April 21	Cleveland Lumberjacks	4–7	Grand Rapids Griffins	Van Andel Arena

April 23	Grand Rapids Griffins	2–1	Cleveland Lumberjacks	Gund Arena

April 25	Grand Rapids Griffins	3–0	Cleveland Lumberjacks	Gund Arena

Grand Rapids wins series 4–0

==== (E2) Orlando Solar Bears vs. (E3) Cincinnati Cyclones ====
April 19	Cincinnati Cyclones	5–2	Orlando Solar Bears	TD Waterhouse Centre

April 22	Cincinnati Cyclones	1–2	OT	Orlando Solar Bears	TD Waterhouse Centre

April 24	Orlando Solar Bears	4–2	Cincinnati Cyclones	Firstar Center

April 26	Orlando Solar Bears	4–2	Cincinnati Cyclones	Firstar Center

April 28	Orlando Solar Bears	4–2	Cincinnati Cyclones	Firstar Center

Orlando wins series 4–1

==== (W1) Chicago Wolves vs. (E5) Milwaukee Admirals ====
April 20	Milwaukee Admirals	2–4	Chicago Wolves	Allstate Arena

April 21	Milwaukee Admirals	1–5	Chicago Wolves	Allstate Arena

April 24	Chicago Wolves	2–3	Milwaukee Admirals	Bradley Center

April 26	Chicago Wolves	3–2	Milwaukee Admirals	Bradley Center

April 27	Milwaukee Admirals	2–5	Chicago Wolves	Allstate Arena

Chicago wins series 4–1

==== (W2) Houston Aeros vs. (W3) Manitoba Moose ====
April 20	Manitoba Moose	1–5	Houston Aeros	Compaq Center

April 21	Manitoba Moose	2–1	Houston Aeros	Compaq Center

April 26	Houston Aeros	2–1	Manitoba Moose	Winnipeg Arena

April 27	Houston Aeros	3–2	OT	Manitoba Moose	Winnipeg Arena

April 29	Houston Aeros	2–3	OT	Manitoba Moose	Winnipeg Arena

May 1	Manitoba Moose	3–2	OT	Houston Aeros	Compaq Center

May 2	Manitoba Moose	3–1	Houston Aeros	Compaq Center

Manitoba wins series 4–3

=== Semifinals ===
==== (E1) Grand Rapids Griffins vs. (E2) Orlando Solar Bears ====
May 3	Orlando Solar Bears	4–3	OT	Grand Rapids Griffins	Van Andel Arena

May 5	Grand Rapids Griffins	4–2	Orlando Solar Bears	TD Waterhouse Centre

May 6	Grand Rapids Griffins	3–5	Orlando Solar Bears	TD Waterhouse Centre

May 9	Orlando Solar Bears	4–3	OT	Grand Rapids Griffins	Van Andel Arena

May 10	Orlando Solar Bears	3–8	Grand Rapids Griffins	Van Andel Arena

May 12	Grand Rapids Griffins	0–2	Orlando Solar Bears	TD Waterhouse Centre

Orlando wins series 4–2

==== (W1) Chicago Wolves vs. (W3) Manitoba Moose ====
May 4	Manitoba Moose	4–1	Chicago Wolves	Allstate Arena

May 5	Manitoba Moose	0–5	Chicago Wolves	Allstate Arena

May 10	Chicago Wolves	3–4	OT	Manitoba Moose	Winnipeg Arena

May 11	Chicago Wolves	4–1	Manitoba Moose	Winnipeg Arena

May 13	Manitoba Moose	0–1	Chicago Wolves	Allstate Arena

May 15	Chicago Wolves	6–4	Manitoba Moose	Winnipeg Arena

Chicago wins series 4–2

=== Turner Cup Final ===
==== (E2) Orlando Solar Bears vs. (W1) Chicago Wolves ====
May 19	Chicago Wolves	2–7	Orlando Solar Bears	TD Waterhouse Centre

May 20	Chicago Wolves	1–5	Orlando Solar Bears	TD Waterhouse Centre

May 23	Orlando Solar Bears	1–3	Chicago Wolves	Allstate Arena

May 25	Orlando Solar Bears	2–1	OT	Chicago Wolves	Allstate Arena

May 26	Chicago Wolves	1–5	Orlando Solar Bears	TD Waterhouse Centre

Orlando wins series 4–1

== Player statistics ==
=== Scoring leaders ===
Note: GP = Games played; G = Goals; A = Assists; Pts = Points; PIM = Penalty minutes

Player	Team	GP	G	A	Pts	PIM
Derek King	Grand Rapids Griffins	76	32	51	83	19
Steve Larouche	Chicago Wolves	75	31	52	83	78
Brett Harkins	Houston Aeros	81	16	64	80	51
Brian Bonin	Cleveland Lumberjacks	72	35	42	77	45
Rob Brown	Chicago Wolves	75	24	53	77	99
Niklas Andersson	Chicago Wolves	66	33	39	72	81
Greg Koehler	Cincinnati Cyclones	80	35	36	71	122
Vyacheslav Butsayev	Grand Rapids Griffins	75	33	35	68	65
Christian Matte	Cleveland Lumberjacks	58	38	29	67	59
Gilbert Dionne	Cincinnati Cyclones	80	23	43	66	46

=== Leading goaltenders ===
Note: GP = Games played; Min = Minutes played; GA = Goals against; GAA = Goals against average; W = Wins; L = Losses; T = Ties; SO = Shutouts

Player	Team	GP	MIN	GA	GAA	W	L	T	SO
Norm Maracle	Orlando Solar Bears	51	2,963	100	2.02	33	13	3	8
Richard Shulmistra	Kansas City Blades/Chicago Wolves	33	1,855	64	2.07	21	11	0	4
Mike Fountain	Grand Rapids Griffins	52	3,005	104	2.08	34	10	6	6
Chris Mason	Milwaukee Admirals	37	2,226	87	2.35	17	14	5	5
Rick Tabaracci	Utah Grizzlies	30	1,648	67	2.44	14	13	1	1

== Awards ==
AHL Awards
Turner Cup	Orlando Solar Bears
Fred A. Huber Trophy (Best regular-season record)	Grand Rapids Griffins
Commissioner's Trophy (Best coach)	Peter Horachek, Orlando Solar Bears
Leo P. Lamoureux Memorial Trophy (Player with most points)	Steve Larouche, Chicago Wolves and Derek King, Grand Rapids Griffins
James Gatschene Memorial Trophy (Most valuable player, regular season)	Norm Maracle, Orlando Solar Bears
Norman R. "Bud" Poile Trophy (Most valuable player, playoffs)	Norm Maracle, Orlando Solar Bears
Gary F. Longman Memorial Trophy (Best first-year player)	Brian Pothier, Orlando Solar Bears
Ken McKenzie Trophy (Best American-born first-year player)	Brian Pothier, Orlando Solar Bears
Larry D. Gordon Trophy (Best defenceman)	Brett Hauer, Manitoba Moose
James Norris Memorial Trophy (Goaltender(s) of team with fewest goals against)	Norm Maracle and Scott Fankhouser, Orlando Solar Bears
John Cullen Award (Perseverance, Sportsmanship, and Dedication)	Rusty Fitzgerald, Manitoba Moose
Ironman Award (Played all team's games while showing offensive and defensive skills)	Brian Chapman, Manitoba Moose
IHL Man of the Year (Leadership and community activities)	Wendell Young, Chicago Wolves

=== All-Star teams ===
First team	Position		Second team
Norm Maracle, Orlando Solar Bears	G	C	Brian Bonin, Cleveland Lumberjacks
Curtis Murphy, Orlando Solar Bears	D	C	Greg Koehler, Cincinnati Cyclones
Brett Hauer, Manitoba Moose	D	LW	Derek King, Grand Rapids Griffins
