= Brian Chapman =

Canadian retired ice hockey defenceman

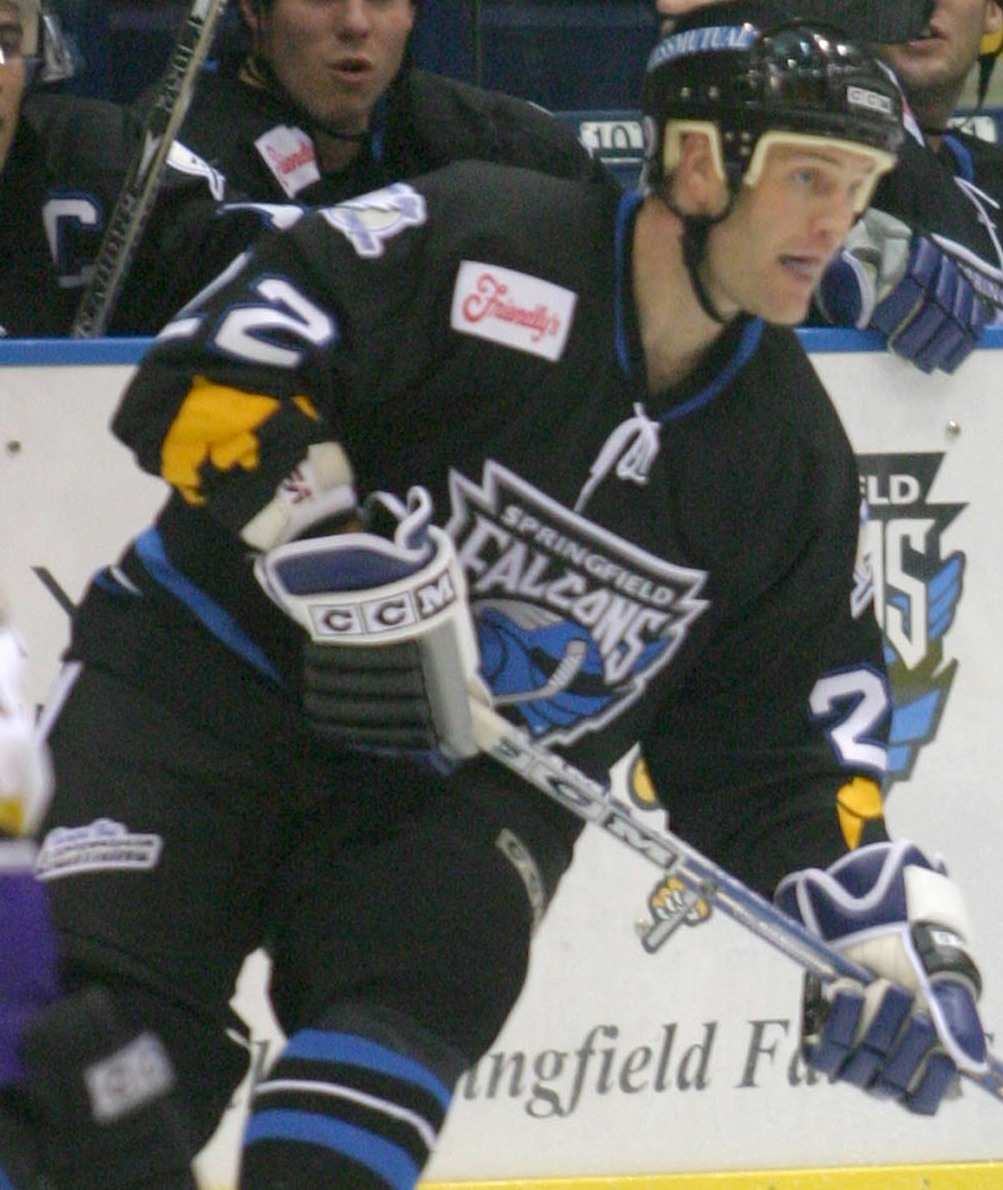
- Chapman with the Springfield Falcons in 2004
- Born: February 10, 1968 (age 58) Brockville, Ontario, Canada
- Height: 6 ft 1 in (185 cm)
- Weight: 194 lb (88 kg; 13 st 12 lb)
- Position: Defence
- Shot: Right
- Played for: Hartford Whalers
- NHL draft: 74th overall, 1986; Hartford Whalers
- Playing career: 1984–2005

Brian Chapman (born February 10, 1968) is a Canadian former professional ice hockey defenceman. He was drafted 74th overall by the Hartford Whalers in the 1986 NHL entry draft. He played three games for the Whalers in the NHL during the 1990-91 season. He received the 2000-01 Ironman Award while playing for the Manitoba Moose.

Chapman was born in Brockville, Ontario.

== Career statistics ==
			Regular season					Playoffs
Season	Team	League	GP	G	A	Pts	PIM	GP	G	A	Pts	PIM
1983–84	Brockville Braves	CJHL	10	0	1	1	8	—	—	—	—	—
1984–85	Brockville Braves	CJHL	50	11	32	43	145	—	—	—	—	—
1985–86	Belleville Bulls	OHL	66	6	31	37	16	24	2	6	8	54
1986–87	Belleville Bulls	OHL	54	4	32	36	142	6	1	1	2	10
1986–87	Binghamton Whalers	AHL	—	—	—	—	—	1	0	0	0	0
1987–88	Belleville Bulls	OHL	63	11	57	68	180	6	1	4	5	13
1988–89	Binghamton Whalers	AHL	71	5	25	30	216	—	—	—	—	—
1989–90	Binghamton Whalers	AHL	68	2	15	17	180	—	—	—	—	—
1990–91	Springfield Indians	AHL	60	4	23	27	200	18	1	4	5	62
1990–91	Hartford Whalers	NHL	3	0	0	0	29	—	—	—	—	—
1991–92	Springfield Indians	AHL	73	3	26	29	245	10	2	2	4	25
1992–93	Springfield Indians	AHL	72	17	34	51	212	15	2	5	7	43
1993–94	Phoenix Roadrunners	IHL	78	6	35	41	280	—	—	—	—	—
1994–95	Phoenix Roadrunners	IHL	60	2	23	25	181	9	1	5	6	31
1995–96	Phoenix Roadrunners	IHL	66	8	11	19	187	4	0	1	1	14
1996–97	Phoenix Roadrunners	IHL	69	9	16	25	109	—	—	—	—	—
1996–97	Long Beach Ice Dogs	IHL	14	1	7	8	67	17	0	3	3	38
1997–98	Long Beach Ice Dogs	IHL	6	0	1	1	15	—	—	—	—	—
1997–98	Manitoba Moose	IHL	77	3	25	28	159	3	0	0	0	10
1998–99	Manitoba Moose	IHL	76	3	15	18	127	5	0	0	0	12
1999–00	Manitoba Moose	IHL	80	7	30	37	153	2	0	0	0	2
2000–01	Manitoba Moose	IHL	82	5	21	26	126	13	1	2	3	12
2001–02	Manitoba Moose	AHL	72	2	30	32	95	7	0	5	5	4
2002–03	Manitoba Moose	AHL	60	3	14	17	65	14	0	2	2	20
2003–04	Rochester Americans	AHL	75	5	5	10	71	16	1	0	1	18
2004–05	Springfield Falcons	AHL	49	2	10	12	39	—	—	—	—	—
AHL totals			600	43	182	225	1323	81	6	18	24	172
IHL totals			608	44	184	228	1404	53	2	11	13	119
NHL totals			3	0	0	0	29	—	—	—	—	—
