= 1998–99 IHL season =

North American ice hockey season

1998-99 IHL season
- League: International Hockey League
- Sport: Ice hockey
- Duration: October 9, 1998 – June 5, 1999
- Number of games: 82
- Number of teams: 16

Regular season
- Fred A. Huber Trophy: Houston Aeros
- Season MVP: Brian Wiseman (Aeros)
- Top scorer: Brian Wiseman (Aeros)

Playoffs
- Playoffs MVP: Mark Freer (Aeros)

Turner Cup
- Champions: Houston Aeros
- Runners-up: Orlando Solar Bears

Seasons
- ← 1997–98 1999–2000 →

The 1998–99 IHL season was the 54th season of the International Hockey League, a North American minor professional league. 16 teams participated in the regular season, and the Houston Aeros won the Turner Cup.

== Regular season ==
=== Eastern Conference ===
Central Division	GP	W	L	SOL	GF	GA	Pts
Michigan K-Wings (DAL)	82	35	34	13	232	253	83
Fort Wayne Komets	82	33	33	16	250	280	82
Indianapolis Ice	82	33	37	12	243	277	78
Cleveland Lumberjacks (TBL)	82	28	47	7	248	310	63

Northeast Division	GP	W	L	SOL	GF	GA	Pts
Detroit Vipers	82	50	21	11	259	195	111
Orlando Solar Bears	82	45	33	4	264	253	94
Cincinnati Cyclones	82	44	32	6	269	270	94
Grand Rapids Griffins	82	34	40	8	256	281	76

=== Western Conference ===
Midwest Division	GP	W	L	SOL	GF	GA	Pts
Chicago Wolves	82	49	21	12	285	246	110
Manitoba Moose	82	47	21	14	269	236	108
Kansas City Blades	82	44	31	7	256	270	95
Milwaukee Admirals (NSH)	82	38	28	16	254	265	92

Southwest Division	GP	W	L	SOL	GF	GA	Pts
Houston Aeros	82	54	15	13	307	209	121
Long Beach Ice Dogs (LAK)	82	48	28	6	260	237	102
Utah Grizzlies	82	39	34	9	244	254	87
Las Vegas Thunder (PHX)	82	35	39	8	247	307	78

== Turner Cup-Playoffs ==
Turner Cup-Pre-Playoffs	Turner Cup-Quarterfinals
E1	Detroit	3
E6	Indianapolis	1
E3	Cincinnati	1
E6	Indianapolis	2
Eastern Conference
E2	Orlando	3
E4	Michigan	0
E4	Michigan	2
E5	Fort Wayne	0
W1	Houston	3
W4	Long Beach	2
W4	Long Beach	2
W5	Kansas City	1
W2	Chicago	3
W3	Manitoba	0
W3	Manitoba	2
W6	Milwaukee	0

Turner Cup-Semifinals
E1	Detroit	3
E2	Orlando	4
W1	Houston	4
W2	Chicago	3

Turner Cup-Final
E2	Orlando	3
W1	Houston	4

=== Pre-Playoffs ===
==== (E3) Cincinnati Cyclones vs. (E6) Indianapolis Ice ====
April 20	Indianapolis Ice	2–4	Cincinnati Cyclones	The Crown

April 23	Cincinnati Cyclones	3–4	OT	Indianapolis Ice	Pepsi Coliseum

April 24	Indianapolis Ice	1–0	Cincinnati Cyclones	The Crown

Indianapolis wins series 2–1

==== (E4) Michigan K-Wings vs. (E5) Fort Wayne Komets ====
April 21	Fort Wayne Komets	2–5	Michigan K-Wings	Wings Stadium

April 23	Michigan K-Wings	4–1	Fort Wayne Komets	Allen County War Memorial Coliseum

Michigan wins series 2–0

==== (W3) Manitoba Moose vs. (W6) Milwaukee Admirals ====
April 21	Manitoba Moose	4–3	Milwaukee Admirals	Bradley Center

April 23	Milwaukee Admirals	3–4	OT	Manitoba Moose	Winnipeg Arena

Manitoba wins series 2–0

==== (W4) Long Beach Ice Dogs vs. (W5) Kansas City Blades ====
April 21	Long Beach Ice Dogs	4–0	Kansas City Blades	Kemper Arena

April 22	Kansas City Blades	4–0	Long Beach Ice Dogs	Long Beach Sports Arena

April 25	Kansas City Blades	1–2	Long Beach Ice Dogs	Long Beach Sports Arena

Long Beach wins series 2–1

=== Quarterfinals ===
==== (E1) Detroit Vipers vs. (E6) Indianapolis Ice ====
April 27	Indianapolis Ice	1–0	OT	Detroit Vipers	The Palace of Auburn Hills

April 30	Indianapolis Ice	2–7	Detroit Vipers	The Palace of Auburn Hills

May 1	Detroit Vipers	3–2	OT	Indianapolis Ice	Pepsi Coliseum

May 3	Detroit Vipers	3–2	Indianapolis Ice	Pepsi Coliseum

Detroit wins series 3–1

==== (E2) Orlando Solar Bears vs. (E4) Michigan K-Wings ====
April 27	Michigan K-Wings	1–5	Orlando Solar Bears	Orlando Arena

April 29	Michigan K-Wings	2–3	OT	Orlando Solar Bears	Orlando Arena

May 1	Orlando Solar Bears	3–2	Michigan K-Wings	Wings Stadium

Orlando wins series 3–0

==== (W1) Houston Aeros vs. (W4) Long Beach Ice Dogs ====
April 28	Long Beach Ice Dogs	4–1	Houston Aeros	Compaq Center

May 1	Long Beach Ice Dogs	1–4	Houston Aeros	Compaq Center

May 2	Houston Aeros	1–5	Long Beach Ice Dogs	Long Beach Sports Arena

May 4	Houston Aeros	3–2	OT	Long Beach Ice Dogs	Long Beach Sports Arena

May 6	Long Beach Ice Dogs	2–4	Houston Aeros	Compaq Center

Houston wins series 3–2

==== (W2) Chicago Wolves vs. (W3) Manitoba Moose ====
April 28	Manitoba Moose	1–2	Chicago Wolves	Rosemont Horizon

April 30	Manitoba Moose	4–5	OT	Chicago Wolves	Rosemont Horizon

May 1	Chicago Wolves	5–4	Manitoba Moose	Winnipeg Arena

Chicago wins series 3–0

=== Semifinals ===
==== (E1) Detroit Vipers vs. (E2) Orlando Solar Bears ====
May 9	Orlando Solar Bears	3–5	Detroit Vipers	The Palace of Auburn Hills

May 10	Orlando Solar Bears	1–7	Detroit Vipers	The Palace of Auburn Hills

May 12	Detroit Vipers	3–2	OT	Orlando Solar Bears	Orlando Arena

May 15	Detroit Vipers	2–3	Orlando Solar Bears	Orlando Arena

May 16	Orlando Solar Bears	2–1	Detroit Vipers	The Palace of Auburn Hills

May 19	Detroit Vipers	1–4	Orlando Solar Bears	Orlando Arena

May 21	Orlando Solar Bears	5–4	OT	Detroit Vipers	The Palace of Auburn Hills

Orlando wins series 4–3

==== (W1) Houston Aeros vs. (W2) Chicago Wolves ====
May 8	Chicago Wolves	2–5	Houston Aeros	Compaq Center

May 10	Chicago Wolves	5–4	OT	Houston Aeros	Compaq Center

May 12	Houston Aeros	4–2	Chicago Wolves	Rosemont Horizon

May 14	Houston Aeros	5–0	Chicago Wolves	Rosemont Horizon

May 15	Houston Aeros	1–2	Chicago Wolves	Rosemont Horizon

May 18	Chicago Wolves	3–0	Houston Aeros	Compaq Center

May 20	Chicago Wolves	1–4	Houston Aeros	Compaq Center

Houston wins series 4–3

=== Turner Cup Final ===
==== (E2) Orlando Solar Bears vs. (W1) Houston Aeros ====
May 23	Orlando Solar Bears	3–6	Houston Aeros	Compaq Center

May 25	Orlando Solar Bears	4–2	Houston Aeros	Compaq Center

May 27	Houston Aeros	6–1	Orlando Solar Bears	Orlando Arena

May 29	Houston Aeros	5–4	OT	Orlando Solar Bears	Orlando Arena

June 1	Houston Aeros	4–5	OT	Orlando Solar Bears	Orlando Arena

June 3	Orlando Solar Bears	3–2	Houston Aeros	Compaq Center

June 5	Orlando Solar Bears	3–5	Houston Aeros	Compaq Center

Houston wins series 4–3

== Player statistics ==
=== Scoring leaders ===
Note: GP = Games played; G = Goals; A = Assists; Pts = Points; PIM = Penalty minutes

Player	Team	GP	G	A	Pts	PIM
Brian Wiseman	Houston Aeros	77	21	88	109	106
Steve Maltais	Chicago Wolves	82	56	54	100	164
Bill Bowler	Kansas City Blades	82	26	67	93	59
Gilbert Dionne	Cincinnati Cyclones	76	35	53	88	123
Todd Simon	Cincinnati Cyclones	81	26	61	87	72
Brett Harkins	Cleveland Lumberjacks	74	20	67	87	84
Jeff Christian	Houston Aeros	80	45	41	86	252
Glen Metropolit	Grand Rapids Griffins	77	28	53	81	92
Chris Marinucci	Chicago Wolves	82	41	40	81	24
David Hymovitz	Indianapolis Ice	78	46	30	76	42

=== Leading goaltenders ===
Note: GP = Games played; Min – Minutes played; GA = Goals against; GAA = Goals against average; W = Wins; L = Losses; T = Ties; SO = Shutouts

Player	Team	GP	MIN	GA	GAA	W	L	T	SO
Kevin Weekes	Detroit Vipers	33	1,857	64	2.07	19	5	7	4
Andrei Trefilov	Indianapolis Ice/Detroit Vipers	45	2,599	92	2.12	26	14	4	3
Manny Legace	Long Beach Ice Dogs	33	1,796	67	2.24	22	8	1	2
Manny Fernandez	Houston Aeros	50	2,949	116	2.36	34	6	9	2
Christian Bronsard	Manitoba Moose	33	1,746	71	2.44	15	8	4	1

== Awards ==
1999 IHL awards
Turner Cup	Houston Aeros
Fred A. Huber Trophy: (Best regular-season record)	Houston Aeros
Frank Gallagher Trophy: (Eastern Conference playoff champion)	Orlando Solar Bears
Ken Ullyot Trophy: (Western Conference playoff champion)	Houston Aeros
Commissioner's Trophy: (Best coach)	Dave Tippett, Houston Aeros
Gary F. Longman Memorial Trophy: (Best first-year player)	Marty Turco, Michigan K-Wings
I. John Snider, II Trophy: (Leadership and humanitarian contribution)	Chris Marinucci, Chicago Wolves
Ironman Award: (Best two-way player over 82 games)	Stan Drulia, Detroit Vipers
James Gatschene Memorial Trophy: (Most valuable player, regular season)	Brian Wiseman, Houston Aeros
James Norris Memorial Trophy: (Goaltenders with lowest GAA)	Andrei Trefilov and Kevin Weekes, Detroit Vipers
John Cullen Award: (Sportsmanship, perseverance, and dedication)	Jeff Christian, Houston Aeros
Ken McKenzie Trophy: (Best U.S.-born first-year player)	Mark Mowers, Milwaukee Admirals
Larry D. Gordon Trophy: (Best defenceman)	Greg Hawgood, Houston Aeros
Leo P. Lamoureux Memorial Trophy: (Player with most points)	Brian Wiseman, Houston Aeros
Norman R. "Bud" Poile Trophy: (Most valuable player, playoffs)	Mark Freer, Houston Aeros

=== All-Star teams ===
First team	Position		Second team
Patrick Lalime, Kansas City Blades	G		Andrei Trefilov, Indianapolis Ice/Detroit Vipers
Brett Hauer, Manitoba Moose	D		Dan Lambert, Long Beach Ice Dogs
Greg Hawgood, Houston Aeros	D		Tom Tilley, Chicago Wolves
Brian Wiseman, Houston Aeros	C		Bill Bowler, Kansas City Blades
Scott Thomas, Manitoba Moose	RW	C	Chris Marinucci, Chicago Wolves
Steve Maltais, Chicago Wolves	LW		David Hymovitz, Indianapolis Ice
