= Stan Drulia =

Canadian ice hockey player (born 1968)

- Born: January 5, 1968 (age 58) Elmira, New York, U.S.
- Height: 5 ft 10 in (178 cm)
- Weight: 180 lb (82 kg; 12 st 12 lb)
- Position: Right wing
- Shot: Right
- Played for: Tampa Bay Lightning
- NHL draft: 214th overall, 1986; Pittsburgh Penguins
- Playing career: 1989–2001

Stanley W. Drulia (born January 5, 1968) is an American former professional right winger and currently the Head Professional Scout for the Nashville Predators of the NHL. One of the most prolific minor league scorers of his day, Drulia scored 823 points in the minors in only ten full seasons.

== Playing career ==
Drulia was born in Elmira, New York, but grew up in Fort Erie, Ontario. He was drafted in the eleventh round, 214th overall, by the Pittsburgh Penguins in the 1986 NHL entry draft. He played 126 games in the National Hockey League, all with the Tampa Bay Lightning, scoring 15 goals and 27 assists.

Drulia played junior ice hockey in the Ontario Hockey League with the Belleville Bulls, Hamilton Steelhawks, and the Niagara Falls Thunder. Drulia holds the OHL record for most career points with 479. Drulia won the Jim Mahon Memorial Trophy as the top scoring right winger, and the Leo Lalonde Memorial Trophy as overage Player of the Year in the 1988–89 OHL season.

While playing in the International Hockey League, Drulia won the Turner Cup playing for the Atlanta Knights and was playoff MVP winning the Norman R. "Bud" Poile Trophy in 1993–94. Drulia won another Turner Cup in 1996–97 with the Detroit Vipers. Drulia won the Poile Trophy again in 1997–98 with the Detroit Vipers, even though the Vipers lost in 7 games to the Chicago Wolves.

== Personal life ==
After his playing career, Drulia has served as head coach of the Orlando Seals of the Atlantic Coast Hockey League, the Augusta Lynx of the ECHL, and the Port Huron Icehawks of the International Hockey League. On July 1, 2010, Drulia was named head coach of the Wheeling Nailers of the ECHL, but was fired only seventeen games into the next season, despite a second place finish and a berth in the league semi-finals. He was then hired by the Milwaukee Admirals of the AHL as an assistant coach, and served for seven seasons.

== Career statistics ==
=== Regular season and playoffs ===
			Regular season					Playoffs
Season	Team	League	GP	G	A	Pts	PIM	GP	G	A	Pts	PIM
1984–85	Belleville Bulls	OHL	63	24	31	55	33	14	5	4	9	17
1985–86	Belleville Bulls	OHL	66	43	37	80	73	24	4	11	15	15
1986–87	Hamilton Steelhawks	OHL	55	27	51	78	26	9	4	4	8	2
1987–88	Hamilton Steelhawks	OHL	65	52	69	121	44	14	8	16	24	12
1988–89	Maine Mariners	AHL	3	1	1	2	0	—	—	—	—	—
1988–89	Niagara Falls Thunder	OHL	47	52	93	145	59	17	11	26	37	18
1989–90	Cape Breton Oilers	AHL	31	5	7	12	2	—	—	—	—	—
1989–90	Phoenix Roadrunners	IHL	16	6	3	9	2	—	—	—	—	—
1990–91	Knoxville Cherokees	ECHL	64	63	77	140	39	3	3	2	5	4
1991–92	New Haven Nighthawks	AHL	77	49	53	102	46	5	2	4	6	4
1992–93	Atlanta Knights	IHL	47	28	26	54	38	3	2	3	5	4
1992–93	Tampa Bay Lightning	NHL	24	2	1	3	10	—	—	—	—	—
1993–94	Atlanta Knights	IHL	79	54	60	114	70	14	13	12	25	8
1994–95	Atlanta Knights	IHL	66	41	49	90	60	5	1	5	6	2
1995–96	Atlanta Knights	IHL	75	38	56	94	80	3	0	2	2	18
1996–97	Detroit Vipers	IHL	73	33	38	71	42	21	5	21	26	14
1997–98	Detroit Vipers	IHL	58	25	35	60	50	15	2	4	6	16
1998–99	Detroit Vipers	IHL	82	23	52	75	64	11	5	4	9	10
1999–00	Tampa Bay Lightning	NHL	68	11	22	33	24	—	—	—	—	—
2000–01	Tampa Bay Lightning	NHL	34	2	4	6	18	—	—	—	—	—
NHL totals			126	15	27	42	52	—	—	—	—	—
