= Mark Freer =

Canadian ice hockey player

- Born: July 14, 1968 (age 58) Toronto, Ontario, Canada
- Height: 5 ft 10 in (178 cm)
- Weight: 180 lb (82 kg; 12 st 12 lb)
- Position: Centre
- Shot: Left
- Played for: Philadelphia Flyers; Ottawa Senators; Calgary Flames
- National team: Canada
- NHL draft: Undrafted
- Playing career: 1988–2003
Medal record
World Championships
Bronze medal – third place	1995 Sweden

Mark Paul Freer (born July 14, 1968) is a Canadian former professional ice hockey player. He played 124 games in the National Hockey League with the Philadelphia Flyers, Ottawa Senators, and Calgary Flames from 1987 to 1993. He played with three new organizations in three leagues over the course of three consecutive seasons between 1992 and 1994. He won the Turner Cup of the International Hockey League in 1998 and won the bronze medal with Canada men's national ice hockey team at the 1995 World Championships. He retired from hockey in 2003.

== Career ==
=== Amateur ===
As a youth, he played in the 1981 Quebec International Pee-Wee Hockey Tournament with a minor ice hockey team from Peterborough, Ontario. Freer began playing for the Peterborough Petes of the Ontario Hockey League (OHL) beginning in the 1985–86 season. In his rookie season, Freer scored 16 goals, 28 assists and 44 points in 65 games. The team finished in first place in the division, but lost to the Belleville Bulls in the playoff semifinals. In the playoffs, Freer three goals and seven points in 14 games. He returned to Peterborough for the 1986–87 season, where he scored 39 goals and 82 points in 65 games. He added two goals and eight points in 12 playoff games. He was invited to the summer camp for the Canada's national junior team, however, he was sent home with an injury. In his final season with the Petes in 1987–88, Freer was expected to lead the Petes' offence alongside winger Jody Hull. He scored 38 goals with 109 points in 63 games. In 12 playoff games, he registered five goals and 17 points.

=== Professional ===
==== Philadelphia Flyers ====
After his first season in the OHL, Freer was invited to the National Hockey League (NHL)'s Philadelphia Flyers training camp in September 1986. He was returned to his junior team on September 20. Prior to the start of the 1986–87 NHL season, Freer was signed by the Flyers as a unrestricted free agent. In January 1987 Freer was recalled by Philadelphia after a series of injuries to the Flyers' forwards. Freer made his NHL debut against the Buffalo Sabres on January 28 and registered his first NHL point, assisting on Scott Mellanby's second period goal. After playing the one game, he was returned to the Petes. He was recalled again in the following 1987–88 season due to injuries to the Flyers' forward group. He made his NHL season debut on March 6, 1988, in a 4–2 loss to the New Jersey Devils, going scoreless. He was returned to Peterborough after the one game.

In his first professional season in 1988–89, Freer was assigned to Philadelphia's American Hockey League (AHL) affiliate, the Hershey Bears. He scored 30 goals in his AHL rookie season, with 79 points in 75 games. After an injury to centre Dave Poulin, Freer was recalled by Philadelphia on November 16 along with left winger Glen Seabrooke. He was a healthy scratch for the November 17 game against the St. Louis Blues but made his NHL season debut against the Quebec Nordiques on November 19. He registered his only point of the season, assisting on Tim Kerr's first period goal in a 7–1 victory over the New Jersey Devils on November 20. He appeared in five games with the Flyers, marking just the one point before being returned to Hershey alongside defenceman Kerry Huffman on December 1. Hershey made the 1989 Calder Cup playoffs, and in 12 games, Freer scored four goals and ten points.

For the 1989–90 season Freer was assigned to Hershey. In 65 games, he scored 28 goals and 64 points. He missed time in October with an injury to his hand. He was recalled by Philadelphia on November 15, 1989 after an injury to Ron Sutter. He made his NHL season debut against the Minnesota North Stars on November 16. He appeared in one more game against the Winnipeg Jets before being returned to Hershey on November 20 alongside defenceman Jiří Látal. He spent the entire 1990–91 season with Hershey, scoring 18 goals and 62 points in 77 games. Hershey made the 1991 Calder Cup playoffs, in which Freer added one goal and four points in seven games.

Freer opened the 1991–92 season in the AHL with Hershey. He put up 13 goals and 24 points in 31 games with Hershey. He was recalled by Philadelphia on December 9, 1991, replacing centre Martin Hosták, and made his NHL season debut on December 12 against the Toronto Maple Leafs. He registered his first point of the season in the next game on December 14, assisting on Dan Quinn's game-tying goal in the third period of a 1–1 tie with the Chicago Blackhawks. He scored his first NHL goal against goaltender Tim Cheveldae in a 7–3 loss to the Detroit Red Wings on January 21, 1992. He finished the season in Philadelphia, scoring six goals and 13 points in 50 games.

==== Ottawa Senators ====
In the 1992 off season, the NHL expanded by two teams, the Ottawa Senators and the Tampa Bay Lightning. Freer was left unprotected by Philadelphia in the 1992 NHL expansion draft and he was selected by Ottawa. He made the team out of training camp, but was a healthy scratch for the first few games. He made his Ottawa debut on October 16, 1992 in a 5–1 loss to the Washington Capitals. Playing on a line with Lonnie Loach and Andrew McBain, he scored the Senators' only goal of the game against Jim Hrivnak. On October 24, he assisted on Chris Luongo's first NHL goal and he suffered a charley horse in a 3–2 overtime loss to the New York Rangers, and missed 14 games. He returned to the lineup on November 25 against the New Jersey Devils, centreing a line between Mike Peluso and Andrew McBain. On December 9, Freer registered his first multi-goal game, scoring both of Ottawa's goals against the Hartford Whalers in a 6–2 loss. He marked a three-point game against the Buffalo Sabres on February 8, 1993 in a 4–2 victory, scoring one goal and registering two assists. He played in 63 games for Ottawa, scoring ten goals and 24 points. In the 1993 offseason, the NHL expanded by two teams again, the Mighty Ducks of Anaheim and the Florida Panthers. Ottawa was not exempt from the expansion draft, and Freer was among the players left unprotected, but was not selected by either team. Ottawa then offered Freer a termination contract in July (Note: A termination contract allowed the player to seek a better position/contract with another team while still having a one-year contract with the original team for the upcoming season.) and by the end of the month, had bought out the contract, making him a free agent.

==== Calgary Flames ====
On August 10, 1993, Freer signed with the Calgary Flames. He was assigned to Calgary's new AHL affiliate, the Saint John Flames, for the 1993–94 season, where he was expected to be a key member of the team's offence. He was named the AHL Flames' first captain. In 77 games with Saint John, he scored 33 goals and 86 points. He was recalled by Calgary and made his NHL season debut on October 17 against the Mighty Ducks of Anaheim. He was recalled on an emergency basis on November 20 after Gary Roberts was suspended and played in his final NHL game against the Dallas Stars in a 4–3 loss that night. He was returned to Saint John after the game. Saint John made the 1993 Calder Cup playoffs and Freer added two goals and six points in seven games.

==== Minor leagues ====
For the third consecutive season, Freer moved to play for a new franchise after taking part in Ottawa's and Saint John's first seasons. He signed a contract with the Houston Aeros of the International Hockey League (IHL) on July 19, 1994 for their inaugural season. In his first season with Houston in 1994–95, he scored 38 goals and 80 points in 80 games. He added just one assist in four games in the IHL playoffs. Freer struggled in his second year in Houston in 1995–96, scoring only 22 goals and 53 points in 80 games. In the 1996–97 and 1997–98 seasons, he continued on a 50-point pace, registering 57 and then 52. In the 1998 off season, Freer re-signed with Houston. In the 1998–99 season, scored 17 goals and 45 points in 79 games. However, in the 1999 IHL playoffs, he dominated, scoring 11 goals and 22 points in 19 games as the Aeros won the Turner Cup. For his playoff efforts, Freer was awarded the Norman R. "Bud" Poile Trophy as the playoffs most valuable player. In the 1999 off season, he re-signed with the Aeros to a two-year contract. He played one more season in Houston in 1999–2000, scoring 20 goals and 55 points in 75 games. He added four assists in 11 playoff games.

On July 27, 2000, Freer was traded by the Aeros to the Philadelphia Phantoms of the AHL for future considerations. Freer, who was the last original Aero left, departed the Aeros as the team's record holder for games played, goals, assists, points, game-winning goals, and power-play goals. In his first season with the Phantoms in 2000–01, he scored 31 goals and 72 points in 76 games. The Phantoms made the 2001 Calder Cup playoffs and Freer added three goals and four points in ten games. He returned for a second season with the Phantoms in 2001–02. He appeared in his 1,000th professional hockey game that season. He finished the season with 15 goals and 51 points in 80 games. A free agent in the off season, he signed a one-year contract with the Hershey Bears on July 25, 2002, replacing Jeff Daw who had signed with Lowell. He appeared in 70 games for Hershey in the 2002–03 season, scoring 21 goals and 53 points.

== International play ==
In 1995, as the NHL season had been delayed due to the lockout and was still ongoing, the players chosen to represent Team Canada at the 1995 World Championships were chosen from minor leagues. As Freer was playing in the IHL with Houston, he was selected as part of Team Canada. He was late joining the team, arriving in Sweden only for the second game. He scored his only goal of the tournament in a 2–2 tie with Italy on April 29. The team went on to win the bronze medal after defeating the Czech Republic 4–1 on May 6.

== Career statistics ==
=== Regular season and playoffs ===
			Regular season					Playoffs
Season	Team	League	GP	G	A	Pts	PIM	GP	G	A	Pts	PIM
1985–86	Peterborough Petes	OHL	65	16	28	44	24	14	3	4	7	13
1986–87	Philadelphia Flyers	NHL	1	0	1	1	0	—	—	—	—	—
1986–87	Peterborough Petes	OHL	65	39	43	82	44	12	2	6	8	5
1987–88	Philadelphia Flyers	NHL	1	0	0	0	0	—	—	—	—	—
1987–88	Peterborough Petes	OHL	63	38	71	109	63	12	5	12	17	4
1988–89	Philadelphia Flyers	NHL	5	0	1	1	0	—	—	—	—	—
1988–89	Hershey Bears	AHL	75	30	49	79	77	12	4	6	10	2
1989–90	Philadelphia Flyers	NHL	2	0	0	0	0	—	—	—	—	—
1989–90	Hershey Bears	AHL	65	28	36	64	31	—	—	—	—	—
1990–91	Hershey Bears	AHL	77	18	44	62	45	7	1	3	4	17
1991–92	Philadelphia Flyers	NHL	50	6	7	13	18	—	—	—	—	—
1991–92	Hershey Bears	AHL	31	13	11	24	38	6	0	3	3	2
1992–93	Ottawa Senators	NHL	63	10	14	24	39	—	—	—	—	—
1993–94	Calgary Flames	NHL	2	0	0	0	4	—	—	—	—	—
1993–94	Saint John Flames	AHL	77	33	53	86	45	7	4	2	6	16
1994–95	Houston Aeros	IHL	80	38	42	80	52	4	0	1	1	4
1995–96	Houston Aeros	IHL	80	22	31	53	67	—	—	—	—	—
1996–97	Houston Aeros	IHL	81	21	36	57	43	12	2	3	5	4
1997–98	Houston Aeros	IHL	74	14	38	52	41	4	2	2	4	4
1998–99	Houston Aeros	IHL	79	17	28	45	66	19	11	11	22	12
1999–00	Houston Aeros	IHL	75	20	35	55	55	11	0	4	4	4
2000–01	Philadelphia Phantoms	AHL	76	31	41	72	42	10	3	1	4	10
2001–02	Philadelphia Phantoms	AHL	80	15	36	51	32	5	2	1	3	0
2002–03	Hershey Bears	AHL	70	21	32	53	34	3	0	0	0	2
AHL totals			551	189	302	491	344	50	12	18	30	49
IHL totals			469	132	210	342	326	50	15	21	36	28
NHL totals			124	16	23	39	61	—	—	—	—	—

=== International ===
Year	Team	Event	GP	G	A	Pts	PIM
1995	Canada	WC	6	1	0	1	2
Senior totals			6	1	0	1	2
