= Rob Brown (ice hockey) =

Canadian ice hockey player (born 1968)

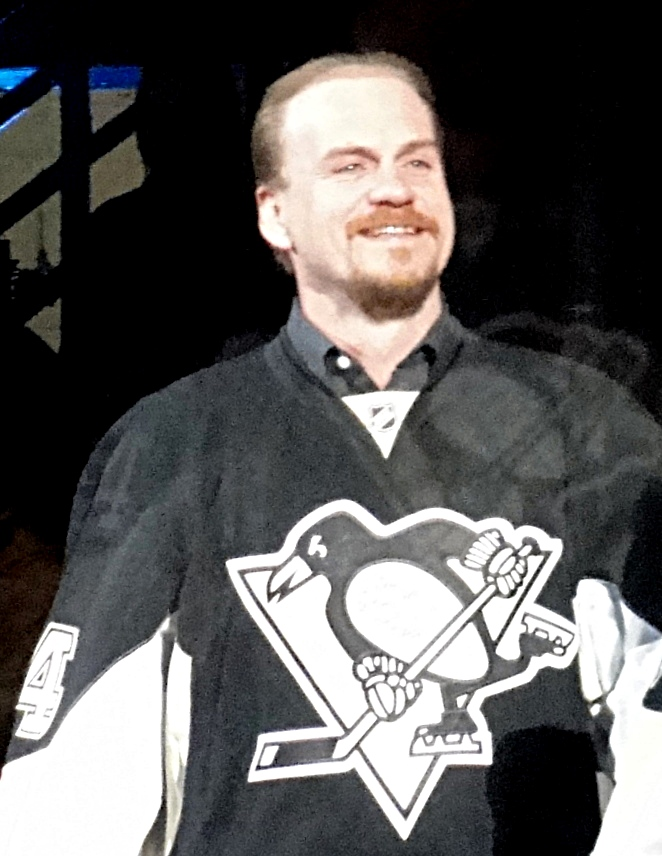
- Brown in 2010
- Born: April 10, 1968 (age 58) Kingston, Ontario, Canada
- Height: 5 ft 11 in (180 cm)
- Weight: 185 lb (84 kg; 13 st 3 lb)
- Position: Right wing
- Shot: Left
- Played for: Pittsburgh Penguins; Hartford Whalers; Chicago Blackhawks; Dallas Stars; Los Angeles Kings
- NHL draft: 67th overall, 1986; Pittsburgh Penguins
- Playing career: 1987–2003

Robert William Brown (born April 10, 1968) is a Canadian former professional ice hockey right winger.

He is best known for his time spent playing for the Pittsburgh Penguins from his debut in 1987 until 1990, and then again from 1997 until 2000. Between and following these stints, Brown shuffled between minor league teams in the International Hockey League (IHL) and other NHL teams, including the Hartford Whalers, Chicago Blackhawks, Dallas Stars, and Los Angeles Kings.

== Playing career ==
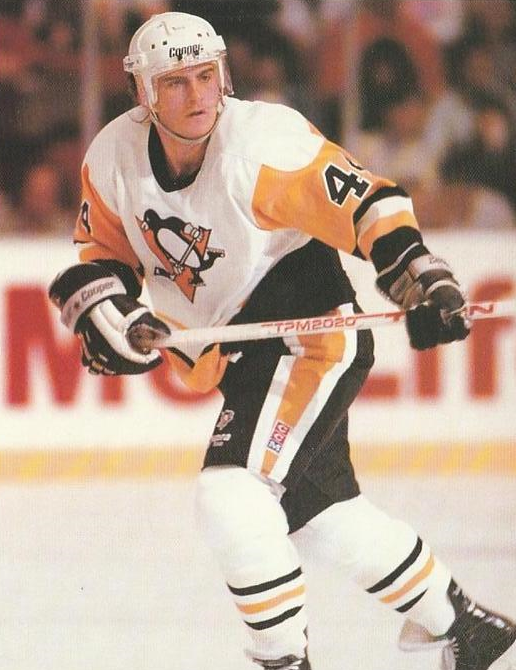
Rob Brown in 1989.

As a youth, he played in the 1981 Quebec International Pee-Wee Hockey Tournament with a minor ice hockey team from Oshawa.

Brown was a prolific scorer at the junior level, averaging over two points per game during his junior career. In particular, Brown flourished in 1986-87 winning multiple awards including Most Valuable Player (West), Top Scorer (West), and the inaugural WHL Plus-Minus Award. Brown also set the current Western Hockey League records for both assists and points with 136 and 212 respectively. He was also named CHL Player of the Year for the 1986-87 season. Brown won a gold medal as a member of Team Canada at the 1988 World Junior Ice Hockey Championships.

Brown was drafted 67th overall by the Pittsburgh Penguins in the 1986 NHL entry draft. His best statistical NHL season was the 1988–89 season, when he played on a line with Mario Lemieux; placing fifth in league scoring, he set career highs with 49 goals, 66 assists, 115 points, 24 power play goals, 6 game-winning goals, and a +27 plus/minus rating. He was also the starting right winger for the 40th National Hockey League All-Star Game. The next season, he scored at a point-per-game average, registering 80 points in 80 games. Brown was traded on December 21, 1990 to the Hartford Whalers for Scott Young. In parts of two seasons, Brown had 73 points in 86 games for the Whalers before being traded on January 24, 1992 to the Chicago Blackhawks in exchange for Steve Konroyd. Brown finished the 1991-92 season playing 25 games for Chicago registering 16 points. In 1992-93, Brown split time with the Chicago Blackhawks and their minor league team the Indianapolis Ice. During the next few years, Brown would sign contracts with the Dallas Stars and Los Angeles Kings, but mostly played in the IHL. Brown led the IHL in scoring for three years and was awarded the James Gatschene Memorial Trophy for league MVP in 1993-94. His scoring production at the IHL level did not go unnoticed and on October 1, 1997 Brown returned to the Pittsburgh Penguins, signing a contract as a free agent. Brown played the next three seasons there, playing a total of 190 games while contributing 87 points. Brown then returned to the minors, ending his career with the Chicago Wolves of the AHL in 2003.

Brown served as a colour commentator for the Edmonton Oilers pay-per-view, and currently is an analyst on 880 CHED for Edmonton Oilers games. In addition to his work on 880 CHED, Brown is also a regular contributor to the Got Yer Back podcast, which is co-hosted by former Oilers defenceman Jason Strudwick and sports journalist Ryan Rishaug. He also became a hockey instructor with the St. Albert Sports Academy, St. Francis Xavier Hockey Academy, and NAX Hockey Academy.

== Personal life ==
Brown was born in Kingston, Ontario, but grew up in St. Albert, Alberta. Rob also spent some early years in Oshawa and Kitchener, Ontario.

== Career statistics ==
=== Regular season and playoffs ===
			Regular season					Playoffs
Season	Team	League	GP	G	A	Pts	PIM	GP	G	A	Pts	PIM
1982–83	St. Albert Sabres	AMHL	61	137	122	259	200	—	—	—	—	—
1982–83	St. Albert Saints	AJHL	1	0	0	0	0	—	—	—	—	—
1983–84	Kamloops Junior Oilers	WHL	50	16	42	58	80	15	1	2	3	17
1983–84	Kamloops Junior Oilers	MC	—	—	—	—	—	4	1	3	4	2
1984–85	Kamloops Blazers	WHL	60	29	50	79	95	15	8	8	26	28
1985–86	Kamloops Blazers	WHL	69	58	115	173	171	16	18	28	46	14
1985–86	Kamloops Blazers	MC	—	—	—	—	—	5	5	6	11	20
1986–87	Kamloops Blazers	WHL	63	76	136	212	101	5	6	5	11	6
1987–88	Pittsburgh Penguins	NHL	51	24	20	44	56	—	—	—	—	—
1988–89	Pittsburgh Penguins	NHL	68	49	66	115	118	11	5	3	8	22
1989–90	Pittsburgh Penguins	NHL	80	33	47	80	102	—	—	—	—	—
1990–91	Pittsburgh Penguins	NHL	25	6	10	16	31	—	—	—	—	—
1990–91	Hartford Whalers	NHL	44	18	24	42	101	5	1	0	1	7
1991–92	Hartford Whalers	NHL	42	16	15	31	39	—	—	—	—	—
1991–92	Chicago Blackhawks	NHL	25	5	11	16	34	8	2	4	6	4
1992–93	Indianapolis Ice	IHL	19	14	19	33	32	2	0	1	1	2
1992–93	Chicago Blackhawks	NHL	15	1	6	7	33	—	—	—	—	—
1993–94	Kalamazoo Wings	IHL	79	42	113	155	188	5	1	3	4	6
1993–94	Dallas Stars	NHL	1	0	0	0	0	—	—	—	—	—
1994–95	Phoenix Roadrunners	IHL	69	34	73	107	135	9	4	12	16	0
1994–95	Los Angeles Kings	NHL	2	0	0	0	0	—	—	—	—	—
1995–96	Chicago Wolves	IHL	79	52	91	143	100	9	4	11	15	6
1996–97	Chicago Wolves	IHL	76	37	80	117	98	4	2	4	6	16
1997–98	Pittsburgh Penguins	NHL	82	15	25	40	59	6	1	0	1	4
1998–99	Pittsburgh Penguins	NHL	58	13	11	24	16	13	2	5	7	8
1999–2000	Pittsburgh Penguins	NHL	50	10	13	23	10	11	1	2	3	0
2000–01	Chicago Wolves	IHL	75	24	53	77	99	16	4	13	17	26
2001–02	Chicago Wolves	AHL	80	29	54	83	103	25	7	26	33	34
2002–03	Chicago Wolves	AHL	59	15	48	63	83	9	1	6	7	6
NHL totals			543	190	248	438	599	54	12	14	26	45
IHL totals			397	203	429	632	652	45	15	44	59	56
AHL totals			139	44	102	146	186	34	8	32	40	40

=== International ===
Medal record

Men's ice hockey

Representing Canada

World Junior Championships
Gold medal – first place	1988 Soviet Union	

Year	Team	Event	GP	G	A	Pts	PIM
1988	Canada	WJC	7	6	2	8	2

== Awards ==
- Bob Brownridge Memorial Trophy (WHL leading scorer) - 1986
- WHL West First All-Star Team – 1986 & 1987

== See also ==
- List of NHL players with 100-point seasons

Awards
Preceded by Cliff Ronning	WHL West Player of the Year; 1986, 1987	Succeeded by Joe Sakic
Preceded by Luc Robitaille	CHL Player of the Year; 1987	Succeeded by Joe Sakic
Preceded by Tony Hrkac	James Gatschene Memorial Trophy; 1994	Succeeded by Tommy Salo
Preceded by Tony Hrkac; Stéphane Morin	Leo P. Lamoureux Memorial Trophy; 1994; 1996, 1997	Succeeded by Stéphane Morin; Patrice Lefebvre
