= 1999–2000 IHL season =

North American ice hockey season

1999-00 IHL season
- League: International Hockey League
- Sport: Ice hockey
- Duration: October 1, 1999 – June 5, 2000
- Number of games: 82
- Number of teams: 13

Regular season
- Fred A. Huber Trophy: Chicago Wolves
- Season MVP: Frederic Chabot (Aeros); Nikolai Khabibulin (Ice Dogs)
- Top scorer: Steve Maltais (Wolves)

Playoffs
- Playoffs MVP: Andrei Trefilov (Wolves)

Turner Cup
- Champions: Chicago Wolves
- Runners-up: Grand Rapids Griffins

Seasons
- ← 1998–99 2000–01 →

The 1999–2000 IHL season was the 55th season of the International Hockey League, a North American minor professional league. 13 teams participated in the regular season, and the Chicago Wolves won the Turner Cup.

== Offseason ==
The Indianapolis Ice departed the IHL and joined the CHL for the CHL’s 1999-00 season.

The Las Vegas Thunder we’re forced to fold after the UNLV refused to renew their lease to continue playing at Thomas & Mack Center forcing the Thunder to fold after failing to negotiate with Orleans Arena and MGM Grand Garden Arena

== Regular season ==
=== Eastern Conference ===
| | GP | W | L | SOL | GF | GA | Pts |
|---|---|---|---|---|---|---|---|
| Grand Rapids Griffins (OTT) | 82 | 51 | 22 | 9 | 254 | 200 | 111 |
| Orlando Solar Bears (ATL) | 82 | 47 | 23 | 12 | 250 | 202 | 106 |
| Cincinnati Cyclones (CAR) | 82 | 44 | 30 | 8 | 244 | 246 | 96 |
| Cleveland Lumberjacks (CHI) | 82 | 40 | 30 | 12 | 225 | 238 | 92 |
| Milwaukee Admirals (NSH) | 82 | 37 | 36 | 9 | 222 | 246 | 83 |
| Michigan K-Wings (DAL) | 82 | 33 | 37 | 12 | 178 | 223 | 78 |
| Detroit Vipers (TBL) | 82 | 22 | 52 | 8 | 163 | 277 | 52 |

=== Western Conference ===
| | GP | W | L | SOL | GF | GA | Pts |
|---|---|---|---|---|---|---|---|
| Chicago Wolves (NYI) | 82 | 53 | 21 | 8 | 270 | 228 | 114 |
| Utah Grizzlies | 82 | 45 | 25 | 12 | 265 | 220 | 102 |
| Houston Aeros | 82 | 44 | 29 | 9 | 219 | 197 | 97 |
| Long Beach Ice Dogs (LAK) | 82 | 44 | 31 | 7 | 234 | 216 | 95 |
| Manitoba Moose | 82 | 37 | 31 | 14 | 227 | 237 | 88 |
| Kansas City Blades | 82 | 36 | 37 | 9 | 249 | 270 | 81 |

== Turner Cup-Playoffs ==
Turner Cup-Pre-Playoffs
E4 | Cleveland | 2
E5 | Milwaukee | 1
W4 | Long Beach | 2
W5 | Manitoba | 0

Turner Cup-Quarterfinals
E1 | Grand Rapids | 4
E4 | Cleveland | 2
Eastern Conference
E2 | Orlando | 2
E3 | Cincinnati | 4
W1 | Chicago | 4
W4 | Long Beach | 0
Western Conference
W2 | Utah | 1
W3 | Houston | 4

Turner Cup-Semifinals
E1 | Grand Rapids | 4
E3 | Cincinnati | 1
W3 | Houston | 2
W1 | Chicago | 4

Turner Cup-Final
E1 | Grand Rapids | 2
W1 | Chicago | 4

=== Pre-Playoffs ===
==== (E4) Cleveland Lumberjacks vs. (E5) Milwaukee Admirals ====
| April 21 | Cleveland Lumberjacks | 2–1 | OT | Milwaukee Admirals | Bradley Center |

| April 22 | Milwaukee Admirals | 5–4 | OT | Cleveland Lumberjacks | Gund Arena |

| April 24 | Milwaukee Admirals | 2–5 | Cleveland Lumberjacks | Gund Arena |

| Cleveland wins series 2–1 |

==== (W4) Long Beach Ice Dogs vs. (W5) Manitoba Moose ====
| April 19 | Long Beach Ice Dogs | 5–2 | Manitoba Moose | Winnipeg Arena |

| April 21 | Manitoba Moose | 2–3 | OT | Long Beach Ice Dogs | Long Beach Sports Arena |

| Long Beach wins series 2–0 |

=== Quarterfinals ===
==== (E1) Grand Rapids Griffins vs. (E4) Cleveland Lumberjacks ====
| April 26 | Cleveland Lumberjacks | 2–1 | OT | Grand Rapids Griffins | Van Andel Arena |

| April 27 | Cleveland Lumberjacks | 0–2 | Grand Rapids Griffins | Van Andel Arena |

| April 30 | Grand Rapids Griffins | 4–3 | OT | Cleveland Lumberjacks | Gund Arena |

| May 2 | Grand Rapids Griffins | 4–1 | Cleveland Lumberjacks | Gund Arena |

| May 4 | Cleveland Lumberjacks | 2–0 | Grand Rapids Griffins | Van Andel Arena |

| May 7 | Grand Rapids Griffins | 5–2 | Cleveland Lumberjacks | Gund Arena |

| Grand Rapids wins series 4–2 |

==== (E2) Orlando Solar Bears vs. (E3) Cincinnati Cyclones ====
| April 26 | Cincinnati Cyclones | 5–1 | Orlando Solar Bears | TD Waterhouse Centre |

| April 28 | Cincinnati Cyclones | 1–2 | OT | Orlando Solar Bears | TD Waterhouse Centre |

| April 29 | Orlando Solar Bears | 0–5 | Cincinnati Cyclones | Firstar Center |

| May 1 | Orlando Solar Bears | 5–6 | OT | Cincinnati Cyclones | Firstar Center |

| May 3 | Orlando Solar Bears | 3–1 | Cincinnati Cyclones | Firstar Center |

| May 6 | Cincinnati Cyclones | 1–0 | Orlando Solar Bears | TD Waterhouse Centre |

| Cincinnati wins series 4–2 |

==== (W1) Chicago Wolves vs. (W4) Long Beach Ice Dogs ====
| April 26 | Long Beach Ice Dogs | 1–3 | Chicago Wolves | Allstate Arena |

| April 28 | Long Beach Ice Dogs | 1–4 | Chicago Wolves | Allstate Arena |

| May 1 | Chicago Wolves | 5–1 | Long Beach Ice Dogs | Long Beach Sports Arena |

| May 3 | Chicago Wolves | 4–1 | Long Beach Ice Dogs | Long Beach Sports Arena |

| Chicago wins series 4–0 |

==== (W2) Utah Grizzlies vs. (W3) Houston Aeros ====
| April 25 | Houston Aeros | 1–2 | Utah Grizzlies | E Center |

| April 28 | Houston Aeros | 3–0 | Utah Grizzlies | E Center |

| April 29 | Utah Grizzlies | 0–1 | OT | Houston Aeros | Compaq Center |

| May 1 | Utah Grizzlies | 1–3 | Houston Aeros | Compaq Center |

| May 3 | Houston Aeros | 3–2 | Utah Grizzlies | E Center |

| Houston wins series 4–1 |

=== Semifinals ===
==== (E1) Grand Rapids Griffins vs. (E3) Cincinnati Cyclones ====
| May 12 | Cincinnati Cyclones | 2–1 | Grand Rapids Griffins | Van Andel Arena |

| May 13 | Cincinnati Cyclones | 3–4 | Grand Rapids Griffins | Van Andel Arena |

| May 19 | Grand Rapids Griffins | 10–1 | Cincinnati Cyclones | Firstar Center |

| May 20 | Grand Rapids Griffins | 4–1 | Cincinnati Cyclones | Firstar Center |

| May 23 | Cincinnati Cyclones | 1–6 | Grand Rapids Griffins | Van Andel Arena |

| Grand Rapids wins series 4–1 |

==== (W1) Chicago Wolves vs. (W3) Houston Aeros ====
| May 10 | Houston Aeros | 5–0 | Chicago Wolves | Allstate Arena |

| May 14 | Houston Aeros | 4–1 | Chicago Wolves | Allstate Arena |

| May 16 | Chicago Wolves | 6–4 | Houston Aeros | Compaq Center |

| May 19 | Chicago Wolves | 2–0 | Houston Aeros | Compaq Center |

| May 21 | Houston Aeros | 2–4 | Chicago Wolves | Allstate Arena |

| May 23 | Chicago Wolves | 3–2 | Houston Aeros | Compaq Center |

| Chicago wins series 4–2 |

=== Turner Cup Final ===
==== (E1) Grand Rapids Griffins vs. (W1) Chicago Wolves ====
| May 26 | Grand Rapids Griffins | 3–4 | OT | Chicago Wolves | Allstate Arena |

| May 28 | Grand Rapids Griffins | 0–4 | Chicago Wolves | Allstate Arena |

| May 30 | Chicago Wolves | 3–5 | Grand Rapids Griffins | Van Andel Arena |

| June 1 | Chicago Wolves | 5–3 | Grand Rapids Griffins | Van Andel Arena |

| June 3 | Grand Rapids Griffins | 6–4 | Chicago Wolves | Allstate Arena |

| June 5 | Chicago Wolves | 3–1 | Grand Rapids Griffins | Van Andel Arena |

| Chicago wins series 4–2 |

== Player statistics ==
=== Scoring leaders ===
Note: GP = Games played; G = Goals; A = Assists; Pts = Points; PIM = Penalty minutes

| Player | Team | GP | G | A | Pts | PIM |
|---|---|---|---|---|---|---|
| Steve Maltais | Chicago Wolves | 82 | 44 | 46 | 90 | 78 |
| Steve Larouche | Chicago Wolves | 82 | 31 | 57 | 88 | 52 |
| David Ling | Kansas City Blades | 82 | 35 | 48 | 83 | 210 |
| Gilbert Dionne | Cincinnati Cyclones | 81 | 34 | 49 | 83 | 88 |
| Jarrod Skalde | Utah Grizzlies | 77 | 25 | 54 | 79 | 98 |
| Mark Beaufait | Orlando Solar Bears | 78 | 28 | 50 | 78 | 87 |
| Dave Chyzowski | Kansas City Blades | 81 | 37 | 33 | 70 | 138 |
| Brett Harkins | Cleveland Lumberjacks | 76 | 20 | 50 | 70 | 79 |
| Michel Picard | Grand Rapids Griffins | 65 | 33 | 35 | 68 | 50 |
| Todd Simon | Cincinnati Cyclones | 71 | 19 | 48 | 67 | 58 |

=== Leading goaltenders ===
Note: GP = Games played; Min = Minutes played; GA = Goals against; GAA = Goals against average; W = Wins; L = Losses; T = Ties; SO = Shutouts

| Player | Team | GP | MIN | GA | GAA | W | L | T | SO |
|---|---|---|---|---|---|---|---|---|---|
| Nikolai Khabibulin | Long Beach Ice Dogs | 33 | 1,936 | 59 | 1.83 | 21 | 11 | 1 | 5 |
| Frederic Chabot | Houston Aeros | 62 | 3,695 | 131 | 2.13 | 36 | 19 | 7 | 4 |
| Jani Hurme | Grand Rapids Griffins | 52 | 2,948 | 107 | 2.18 | 29 | 15 | 4 | 4 |
| Rich Parent | Utah Grizzlies/Detroit Vipers | 37 | 2,110 | 81 | 2.30 | 20 | 12 | 4 | 2 |
| Andrei Trefilov | Chicago Wolves | 37 | 2,060 | 81 | 2.36 | 21 | 9 | 3 | 3 |

== Awards ==
AHL Awards
| Turner Cup | Chicago Wolves |
| Fred A. Huber Trophy (Best regular-season record) | Chicago Wolves |
| Commissioner's Trophy (Best coach) | Guy Charron, Grand Rapids Griffins |
| Leo P. Lamoureux Memorial Trophy (Player with most points) | Steve Maltais, Chicago Wolves |
| James Gatschene Memorial Trophy (Most valuable player, regular season) | Frederic Chabot, Houston Aeros and Nikolai Khabibulin, Long Beach Ice Dogs |
| Norman R. "Bud" Poile Trophy (Most valuable player, playoffs) | Andrei Trefilov, Chicago Wolves |
| Gary F. Longman Memorial Trophy (Best first-year player) | Nils Ekman, Long Beach Ice Dogs |
| Ken McKenzie Trophy (Best American-born first-year player) | Andrew Berenzweig, Milwaukee Admirals |
| Larry D. Gordon Trophy (Best defenceman) | Brett Hauer, Manitoba Moose |
| James Norris Memorial Trophy (Goaltender(s) of team with fewest goals against) | Frederic Chabot, Houston Aeros |
| John Cullen Award (Perseverance, Sportsmanship, and Dedication) | Steve Larouche, Chicago Wolves |
| Ironman Award (Played all team's games while showing offensive and defensive skills) | Steve Maltais, Chicago Wolves |
| IHL Man of the Year (Leadership and community activities) | Pat MacLeod, Cincinnati Cyclones |

=== All-Star teams ===
| First team | Position | | Second team |
|---|---|---|---|
| Frederic Chabot, Houston Aeros | G | | Jani Hurme, Grand Rapids Griffins |
| Mike Crowley, Long Beach Ice Dogs | D | | Dallas Eakins, Chicago Wolves |
| Brett Hauer, Manitoba Moose | D | | Bob Nardella, Chicago Wolves |
| Jarrod Skalde, Utah Grizzlies | C | | Steve Larouche, Chicago Wolves |
| David Ling, Kansas City Blades | RW | LW | Niklas Andersson, Chicago Wolves |
| Steve Maltais, Chicago Wolves | LW | | Gilbert Dionne, Cincinnati Cyclones |
