= Rusty Fitzgerald =

American ice hockey player (born 1972)

- Born: October 4, 1972 (age 53) Minneapolis, Minnesota, U.S.
- Height: 6 ft 1 in (185 cm)
- Weight: 185 lb (84 kg; 13 st 3 lb)
- Position: Center
- Shot: Left
- Played for: NHL; Pittsburgh Penguins; DEL; Frankfurt Lions; Iserlohn Roosters; IHL; Cleveland Lumberjacks; Manitoba Moose; Quad City Mallards; WCHL; San Diego Gulls
- NHL draft: 38th overall, 1991; Pittsburgh Penguins
- Playing career: 1995–2003

Russell John Fitzgerald (born October 4, 1972) is an American former professional ice hockey center. He was drafted in the second round, 38th overall, by the Pittsburgh Penguins in the 1991 NHL entry draft.

Fitzgerald played twenty-five games in the National Hockey League with the Penguins in the 1994–95 and 1995–96 seasons. He scored two goals and two assists.

== Personal life ==
Russell played youth hockey in Silver Bay, Minnesota while being coached by Jim McLeod. His younger brother Zack Fitzgerald is currently the Head Coach and Director of Hockey for the Glasgow Clan of the Elite Ice Hockey League.

== Career statistics ==
=== Regular season and playoffs ===
			Regular season					Playoffs
Season	Team	League	GP	G	A	Pts	PIM	GP	G	A	Pts	PIM
1987–88	Silver Bay High School	HS-MN	20	19	26	45	18	—	—	—	—	—
1988–89	Silver Bay High School	HS-MN	22	24	25	49	26	—	—	—	—	—
1989–90	Silver Bay High School	HS-MN	21	25	26	51	24	—	—	—	—	—
1990–91	Duluth East High School	HS-MN	15	14	11	25	24	—	—	—	—	—
1991–92	University of Minnesota-Duluth	WCHA	37	9	11	20	40	—	—	—	—	—
1992–93	University of Minnesota-Duluth	WCHA	39	24	23	47	48	—	—	—	—	—
1993–94	University of Minnesota-Duluth	WCHA	37	11	25	36	59	—	—	—	—	—
1994–95	University of Minnesota-Duluth	WCHA	34	16	22	38	50	—	—	—	—	—
1994–95	Pittsburgh Penguins	NHL	4	1	0	1	0	5	0	0	0	4
1994–95	Cleveland Lumberjacks	IHL	2	0	1	1	0	3	3	0	3	6
1995–96	Pittsburgh Penguins	NHL	21	1	2	3	12	—	—	—	—	—
1995–96	Cleveland Lumberjacks	IHL	46	17	19	36	90	1	0	0	0	2
1997–98	Cleveland Lumberjacks	IHL	34	3	5	8	36	1	0	0	0	0
1998–99	Quad City Mallards	UHL	53	29	25	54	40	12	4	4	8	9
1999–00	Manitoba Moose	IHL	53	18	15	33	31	1	0	0	0	2
1999–00	Quad City Mallards	UHL	18	8	9	17	13	—	—	—	—	—
2000–01	Manitoba Moose	IHL	77	30	15	45	35	12	6	2	8	10
2001–02	San Diego Gulls	WCHL	7	4	3	7	2	6	1	0	1	4
2001–02	Iserlohn Roosters	DEL	59	27	18	45	54	—	—	—	—	—
2002–03	Frankfurt Lions	DEL	17	4	4	8	10	—	—	—	—	—
IHL totals			212	68	55	123	192	18	9	2	11	20
NHL totals			25	2	2	4	12	5	0	0	0	4
