= 1993–94 IHL season =

North American ice hockey season

The 1993–94 IHL season was the 49th season of the International Hockey League, a North American minor professional league. 13 teams participated in the regular season, and the Atlanta Knights won the Turner Cup.

== Regular season ==
Atlantic	GP	W	L	T	OTL	GF	GA	Pts
Kalamazoo Wings	81	48	26	0	7	337	297	103
Fort Wayne Komets	81	41	29	0	11	347	297	93
Cleveland Lumberjacks	81	31	36	0	14	278	344	76

Central	GP	W	L	T	OTL	GF	GA	Pts
Peoria Rivermen	81	51	24	0	6	327	294	108
Cincinnati Cyclones	81	49	23	0	9	336	282	107
Indianapolis Ice	81	28	46	0	7	257	329	63

Midwest	GP	W	L	T	OTL	GF	GA	Pts
Atlanta Knights	81	45	22	0	14	321	282	104
Milwaukee Admirals	81	40	24	0	17	338	302	97
Kansas City Blades	81	40	31	0	10	326	327	90
Russian Penguins	13	2	9	0	2	35	64	6

Pacific	GP	W	L	T	OTL	GF	GA	Pts
Las Vegas Thunder	81	52	18	0	11	319	282	115
San Diego Gulls	81	42	28	0	11	311	302	95
Phoenix Roadrunners	81	40	36	0	5	313	309	85
Salt Lake Golden Eagles	81	24	52	0	5	243	377	53

== Turner Cup-Playoffs ==
Turner Cup-Quarterfinals
M1	Atlanta Knights	4
M2	Milwaukee Admirals	0
P2	San Diego Gulls	4
P1	Las Vegas Thunder	1
A2	Fort Wayne Komets	4
C1	Peoria Rivermen	2
A1	Kalamazoo Wings	1
C2	Cincinnati Cyclones	4

Turner Cup-Semifinals
M1	Atlanta Knights	4
P2	San Diego Gulls	0
A2	Fort Wayne Komets	4
C2	Cincinnati Cyclones	2

Turner Cup-Final
M1	Atlanta Knights	4
A2	Fort Wayne Komets	2

== Awards ==
1994 IHL awards
Turner Cup	Atlanta Knights
Fred A. Huber Trophy: (Best regular-season record)	Las Vegas Thunder
Frank Gallagher Trophy: (Eastern Conference playoff champion)	Fort Wayne Komets
Ken Ullyot Trophy: (Western Conference playoff champion)	Atlanta Knights
Commissioner's Trophy: (Best coach)	Bruce Boudreau, Fort Wayne Komets
Gary F. Longman Memorial Trophy: (Best first-year player)	Radek Bonk, Las Vegas Thunder
Governor's Trophy: (Best defenceman)	Darren Veitch, Peoria Rivermen
I. John Snider, II Trophy: (Leadership and humanitarian contribution)	Robbie Nichols, San Diego Gulls
Ironman Award: (Best two-way player over 82 games)	Colin Chin, Fort Wayne Komets
James Gatschene Memorial Trophy: (Most valuable player, regular season)	Rob Brown, Kalamazoo Wings
James Norris Memorial Trophy: (Goaltenders with fewest goals allowed)	Jean-Claude Bergeron and Mike Greenlay, Atlanta Knights
Ken McKenzie Trophy: (Best U.S.-born first-year player)	Chris Rogles, Indianapolis Ice
Leo P. Lamoureux Memorial Trophy: (Player with most points)	Rob Brown, Kalamazoo Wings
Norman R. "Bud" Poile Trophy: (Most valuable player, playoffs)	Stan Drulia, Atlanta Knights
