= 1992–93 IHL season =

North American ice hockey season

The 1992–93 IHL season was the 48th season of the International Hockey League, a North American minor professional league. 12 teams participated in the regular season, and the Fort Wayne Komets won the Turner Cup.

== Regular season ==
Atlantic	GP	W	L	T	OTL	GF	GA	Pts
Atlanta Knights	82	52	23	0	7	333	291	111
Cleveland Lumberjacks	82	39	34	0	9	329	330	87
Cincinnati Cyclones	82	27	48	0	7	305	364	61

Central	GP	W	L	T	OTL	GF	GA	Pts
Fort Wayne Komets	82	49	27	0	6	339	294	104
Indianapolis Ice	82	34	39	0	9	324	347	77
Kalamazoo Wings	82	29	42	0	11	291	367	69

Midwest	GP	W	L	T	OTL	GF	GA	Pts
Milwaukee Admirals	82	49	23	0	10	329	280	108
Kansas City Blades	82	46	26	0	10	318	288	102
Peoria Rivermen	82	41	33	0	8	297	307	90

Pacific	GP	W	L	T	OTL	GF	GA	Pts
San Diego Gulls	82	62	12	0	8	381	229	132
Salt Lake Golden Eagles	82	38	39	0	5	269	305	81
Phoenix Roadrunners	82	26	50	0	6	248	361	58

== Turner Cup-Playoffs ==
Turner Cup-Quarterfinals
P1	San Diego Gulls	4
M3	Peoria Rivermen	0
M1	Milwaukee Admirals	2
M2	Kansas City Blades	4
C1	Fort Wayne Komets	4
A2	Cleveland Lumberjacks	0
A1	Atlanta Knights	4
C2	Indianapolis Ice	1

Turner Cup-Semifinals
P1	San Diego Gulls	4
M2	Kansas City Blades	2
C1	Fort Wayne Komets	4
A1	Atlanta Knights	0

Turner Cup-Final
P1	San Diego Gulls	0
C1	Fort Wayne Komets	4

== Awards ==
1993 IHL awards
Turner Cup	Fort Wayne Komets
Fred A. Huber Trophy: (Best regular-season record)	San Diego Gulls
Frank Gallagher Trophy: (Eastern Conference playoff champion)	Fort Wayne Komets
Ken Ullyot Trophy: (Western Conference playoff champion)	San Diego Gulls
Commissioner's Trophy: (Best coach)	Al Sims, Fort Wayne Komets
Gary F. Longman Memorial Trophy: (Best first-year player)	Mikhail Shtalenkov, Milwaukee Admirals
Governor's Trophy: (Best defenceman)	Bill Houlder, San Diego Gulls
Ironman Award: (Best two-way player over 82 games)	Dave Michayluk, Cleveland Lumberjacks
James Gatschene Memorial Trophy: (Most valuable player, regular season)	Tony Hrkac, Indianapolis Ice
James Norris Memorial Trophy: (Goaltenders with fewest goals allowed)	Rick Knickle and Clint Malarchuk, San Diego Gulls
Ken McKenzie Trophy: (Best U.S.-born first-year player)	Mark Beaufait, Kansas City Blades
Leo P. Lamoureux Memorial Trophy: (Player with most points)	Tony Hrkac, Indianapolis Ice
Norman R. "Bud" Poile Trophy: (Most valuable player, playoffs)	Pokey Reddick, Fort Wayne Komets
