= 1997–98 IHL season =

North American ice hockey season

1997-98 IHL season
- League: International Hockey League
- Sport: Ice hockey
- Duration: October 2, 1997 – June 15, 1998
- Games: 82
- Teams: 18

Regular season
- Fred A. Huber Trophy: Long Beach Ice Dogs
- Season MVP: Patrice Lefebvre (Thunder)
- Top scorer: Patrice Lefebvre (Thunder)

Playoffs
- Playoffs MVP: Alexander Semak (Wolves)

Turner Cup
- Champions: Chicago Wolves
- Runners-up: Detroit Vipers

Seasons
- 1996–97 1998–99

The 1997–98 IHL season was the 53rd season of the International Hockey League, a North American minor professional league. 18 teams participated in the regular season, and the Chicago Wolves won the Turner Cup. Gordie Howe came out of retirement to play one shift for the Detroit Vipers in the middle of this season.

== Regular season ==
=== Eastern Conference ===
Central Division	GP	W	L	T	OTL	GF	GA	Pts
Fort Wayne Komets	82	47	29	0	6	270	243	100
Cincinnati Cyclones	82	40	30	0	12	275	254	92
Indianapolis Ice	82	40	36	0	6	245	261	86
Cleveland Lumberjacks	82	35	37	0	10	228	262	80
Michigan K-Wings	82	36	39	0	7	223	261	79

Northeast Division	GP	W	L	T	OTL	GF	GA	Pts
Detroit Vipers	82	47	20	0	15	267	232	109
Orlando Solar Bears	82	42	30	0	10	258	251	94
Grand Rapids Griffins	82	38	31	0	13	225	242	89
Québec Rafales	82	27	48	0	7	211	292	61

=== Western Conference ===
Midwest Division	GP	W	L	T	OTL	GF	GA	Pts
Chicago Wolves	82	55	24	0	3	301	258	113
Kansas City Blades	82	41	29	0	12	269	258	94
Milwaukee Admirals	82	43	34	0	5	267	262	91
Manitoba Moose	82	39	36	0	7	269	254	85

Southwest Division	GP	W	L	T	OTL	GF	GA	Pts
Long Beach Ice Dogs	82	53	20	0	9	282	210	115
Houston Aeros	82	50	22	0	10	268	214	110
Utah Grizzlies	82	47	27	0	8	276	234	102
Las Vegas Thunder	82	33	39	0	10	260	305	76
San Antonio Dragons	82	25	49	0	8	233	334	58

== Awards ==
1998 IHL awards
Turner Cup	Chicago Wolves
Fred A. Huber Trophy: (Best regular-season record)	Long Beach Ice Dogs
Frank Gallagher Trophy: (Eastern Conference playoff champion)	Detroit Vipers
Ken Ullyot Trophy: (Western Conference playoff champion)	Chicago Wolves
Comeback Player of the Year Award:	Mike Tomlak, Milwaukee Admirals
Commissioner's Trophy: (Best coach)	John Torchetti, Fort Wayne Komets
Gary F. Longman Memorial Trophy: (Best first-year player)	Todd White, Indianapolis Ice
Governor's Trophy: (Best defenceman)	Dan Lambert, Long Beach Ice Dogs
I. John Snider, II Trophy: (Leadership and humanitarian contribution)	Rod Miller, Utah Grizzlies
Ironman Award: (Best two-way player over 82 games)	Doug Ast, Long Beach Ice Dogs
James Gatschene Memorial Trophy: (Most valuable player, regular season)	Patrice Lefebvre, Las Vegas Thunder
James Norris Memorial Trophy: (Goaltenders with lowest GAA)	Mike Buzak and Kay Whitmore, Long Beach Ice Dogs
Ken McKenzie Trophy: (Best U.S.-born first-year player)	Eric Nickulas, Orlando Solar Bears
Leo P. Lamoureux Memorial Trophy: (Player with most points)	Patrice Lefebvre, Las Vegas Thunder
Norman R. "Bud" Poile Trophy: (Most valuable player, playoffs)	Alexander Semak, Chicago Wolves

== Turner Cup-Playoffs ==
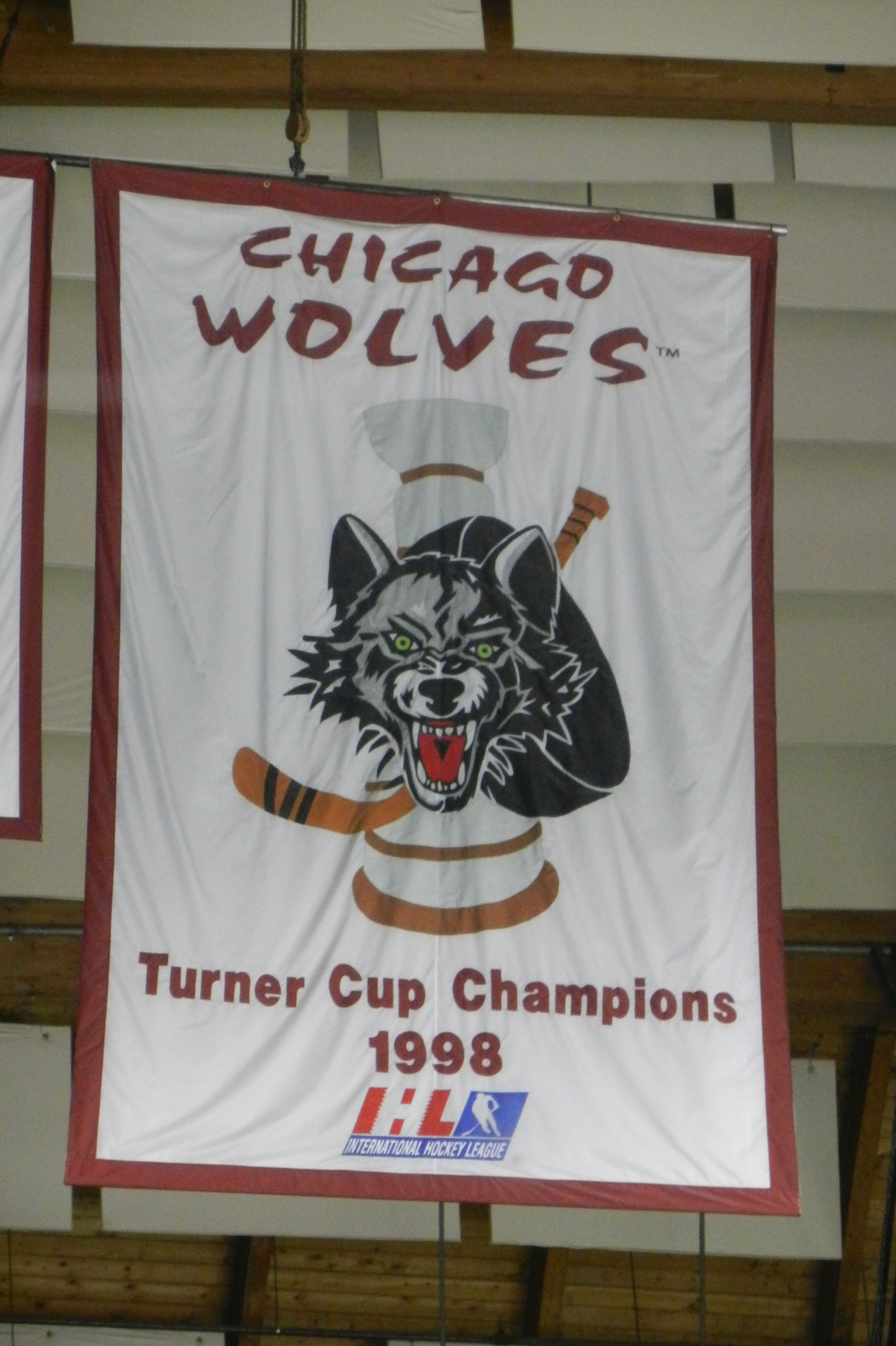
The banner honoring the Chicago Wolves 1998 Turner Cup Championship hanging in the Allstate Arena

Turner Cup-1/8 Finals	Turner Cup-Quarterfinals
E1	Detroit Vipers	3
E8	Michigan K-Wings	1
E1	Detroit Vipers	4
E4	Cincinnati Cyclones	2
E4	Cincinnati Cyclones	3
E5	Grand Rapids Griffins	0
Eastern Conference
E3	Orlando Solar Bears	3
E6	Indianapolis Ice	2
E3	Orlando Solar Bears	4
E7	Cleveland Lumberjacks	2
E2	Fort Wayne Komets	1
E7	Cleveland Lumberjacks	3
W1	Long Beach Ice Dogs	3
W8	Las Vegas Thunder	1
W1	Long Beach Ice Dogs	4
W5	Kansas City Blades	3
W4	Utah Grizzlies	1
W5	Kansas City Blades	3
Western Conference
W2	Chicago Wolves	3
W7	Manitoba Moose	0
W2	Chicago Wolves	4
W6	Milwaukee Admirals	2
W3	Houston Aeros	1
W6	Milwaukee Admirals	3

Turner Cup-Semifinals
E1	Detroit Vipers	4
E3	Orlando Solar Bears	2
W1	Long Beach Ice Dogs	2
W2	Chicago Wolves	4

Turner Cup-Final
E1	Detroit Vipers	3
W2	Chicago Wolves	4
