= Commissioner's Trophy =

Commissioner's Trophy may refer to:

- Commissioner's Trophy (MLB), awarded to the champions of Major League Baseball
- Commissioner's Trophy (IHL), awarded to the International Hockey League's coach of the year between 1985 and 2001

== See also ==
- Major League Baseball All-Star Game Most Valuable Player Award, formerly known as the Commissioner's Trophy
- Commissioner's Historic Achievement Award
