= 1994–95 IHL season =

North American ice hockey season

1994-95 IHL season
- League: International Hockey League
- Sport: Ice hockey
- Games: 81
- Teams: 17

Regular season
- Fred A. Huber Trophy: Denver Grizzlies
- Season MVP: Tommy Salo (Grizzlies)
- Top scorer: Stephane Morin (Moose)

Playoffs
- Playoffs MVP: Kip Miller (Grizzlies)

Turner Cup
- Champions: Denver Grizzlies
- Runners-up: Kansas City Blades

Seasons
- ← 1993–94 1995–96 →

The 1994–95 IHL season was the 50th season of the International Hockey League, a North American minor professional league. 17 teams participated in the regular season, and the Denver Grizzlies won the Turner Cup.

== Regular season ==
Central	GP	W	L	T	OTL	GF	GA	Pts
Milwaukee Admirals	81	44	27	0	10	317	298	98
Houston Aeros	81	38	35	0	8	272	283	84
Atlanta Knights	81	39	37	0	5	279	296	83
Minnesota Moose	81	34	35	0	12	271	336	80
Kansas City Blades	81	35	40	0	6	277	300	76

Midwest	GP	W	L	T	OTL	GF	GA	Pts
Peoria Rivermen	81	51	19	0	11	311	245	113
Cincinnati Cyclones	81	49	22	0	10	305	272	113
Fort Wayne Komets	81	34	39	0	8	296	324	76
Indianapolis Ice	81	32	41	0	8	273	330	72

Northern	GP	W	L	T	OTL	GF	GA	Pts
Detroit Vipers	81	48	27	0	6	311	273	102
Kalamazoo Wings	81	43	24	0	14	288	249	100
Chicago Wolves	81	34	33	0	14	261	306	82
Cleveland Lumberjacks	81	34	37	0	10	306	339	78

Southwest	GP	W	L	T	OTL	GF	GA	Pts
Denver Grizzlies	81	57	18	0	6	339	235	120
Las Vegas Thunder	81	46	30	0	5	328	278	97
Phoenix Roadrunners	81	41	26	0	14	325	310	96
San Diego Gulls	81	37	36	0	8	268	301	82
Soviet Wings	17	1	14	0	2	37	89	4

== Turner Cup Playoffs ==
Turner Cup-1/8 Finals
S1	Denver Grizzlies	3
C4	Minnesota Moose	0
C2	Houston Aeros	1
S3	Phoenix Roadrunners	3
C1	Milwaukee Admirals	3
S4	San Diego Gulls	2
S2	Las Vegas Thunder	3
C3	Atlanta Knights	2
N2	Kalamazoo Wings	3
N3	Chicago Wolves	0
M2	Cincinnati Cyclones	3
N4	Cleveland Lumberjacks	1
M1	Peoria Rivermen	3
M3	Fort Wayne Komets	1
N1	Detroit Vipers	2
C5	Kansas City Blades	3

Turner Cup-Quarterfinals
S1	Denver Grizzlies	4
S3	Phoenix Roadrunners	1
C1	Milwaukee Admirals	4
S2	Las Vegas Thunder	1
N2	Kalamazoo Wings	4
M2	Cincinnati Cyclones	2
M1	Peoria Rivermen	1
C5	Kansas City Blades	4

Turner Cup-Semifinals
S1	Denver Grizzlies	4
C1	Milwaukee Admirals	1
N2	Kalamazoo Wings	3
C5	Kansas City Blades	4

Turner Cup-Final
S1	Denver Grizzlies	4
C5	Kansas City Blades	0

== Awards ==
1995 IHL awards
Turner Cup	Denver Grizzlies
Fred A. Huber Trophy: (Best regular-season record)	Denver Grizzlies
Frank Gallagher Trophy: (Eastern Conference playoff champion)	Kansas City Blades
Ken Ullyot Trophy: (Western Conference playoff champion)	Denver Grizzlies
Commissioner's Trophy: (Best coach)	Butch Goring, Denver Grizzlies
Gary F. Longman Memorial Trophy: (Best first-year player)	Tommy Salo, Denver Grizzlies
Governor's Trophy: (Best defenceman)	Todd Richards, Las Vegas Thunder
I. John Snider, II Trophy: (Leadership and humanitarian contribution)	Mike MacWilliam, Denver Grizzlies
Ironman Award: (Best two-way player over 82 games)	Jean-Marc Richard, Las Vegas Thunder
James Gatschene Memorial Trophy: (Most valuable player, regular season)	Tommy Salo, Denver Grizzlies
James Norris Memorial Trophy: (Goaltenders with fewest goals allowed)	Tommy Salo, Denver Grizzlies
Ken McKenzie Trophy: (Best U.S.-born first-year player)	Chris Marinucci, Denver Grizzlies
Leo P. Lamoureux Memorial Trophy: (Player with most points)	Stephane Morin, Minnesota Moose
Norman R. "Bud" Poile Trophy: (Most valuable player, playoffs)	Kip Miller, Denver Grizzlies
