= Las Vegas Thunder =

Ice hockey club in Las Vegas, Nevada, US

- City: Las Vegas, Nevada
- League: IHL
- Conference: Western
- Division: Pacific; Southwest
- Founded: 1993
- Folded: 1999
- Home arena: Thomas & Mack Center
- Colors: Teal, black, silver, white
- Owners: Hank and Ken Stickney
- Media: Las Vegas Review-Journal
- Affiliates: Phoenix Coyotes (NHL), Knoxville Cherokees and Mississippi Sea Wolves (ECHL), and Lokomotiv Yaroslavl (RSL)

Franchise history
- 1993–1999: Las Vegas Thunder

Championships
- Regular season titles: 2 1993–94, 1995–96
- Division titles: 2 1993–94, 1995–96
- Turner Cups: 0

The Las Vegas Thunder were a professional ice hockey team competing in the International Hockey League. The team's home rink was at the Thomas & Mack Center. They began play in the 1993–1994 season, folding on April 18, 1999. The demise of the franchise was precipitated by the refusal of UNLV officials to negotiate with team owners regarding a new agreement to continue playing at the Thomas & Mack Center after the 1998–1999 season. Without a facility that was suitable even for temporary use, the Thunder were forced to shut down.

== History ==
The Thunder made a strong showing in their first season, finishing with the best record in the league: 115 points and a 52–18–11 record. They topped that performance in 1995–1996 when they again finished with the league's best record (122 points, 57–17–8). The Thunder lost in the conference finals that season.

Throughout the team's history they garnered player development deals with the Phoenix Coyotes of the NHL, the ECHL's Knoxville Cherokees and Mississippi Sea Wolves and Russian side Lokomotiv Yaroslavl.

The Thunder's main rivals included the Denver/Utah Grizzlies, Los Angeles/Long Beach Ice Dogs, San Diego Gulls, and Phoenix Roadrunners. These rivalries later saw a rebirth in the ECHL with the Las Vegas Wranglers and continue with the Henderson Silver Knights of the AHL.

The team's mascot was "Boom-Boom", a polar bear.

The franchise was replaced by:

- Las Vegas Wranglers of the ECHL (2003–2015)
- Vegas Golden Knights of the NHL (2017–present)
- Henderson Silver Knights of the AHL (2020-present)

The Golden Knights later acknowledged their Thunder predecessors by basing their 2020–21 Reverse Retro jerseys off of the Thunder's "V-stripe" pattern.

== Notable alumni ==
- (Canada) Brent Ashton
- (Czech Republic) Radek Bonk
- (Russia) Ilya Byakin
- (Slovakia) Pavol Demitra
- (Canada) / (Switzerland) Paul DiPietro
- (Canada) Bryan Fogarty
- (Canada) Brent Gretzky
- (Canada) Glen Gulutzan
- (United States) Alex Hicks
- (Canada) Greg Hawgood
- (Canada) Peter Ing
- (Canada) Curtis Joseph
- (United States) / (Canada) Andre Sioui
- (Canada) Jim Kyte
- (Canada) / (Italy) Patrice Lefebvre
- (Canada) Clint Malarchuk
- (Canada) Wes McCauley
- (Czech Republic) / (Canada) Petr Nedved
- (Canada) Michel Petit
- (Canada) Manon Rhéaume
- (Canada) Pokey Reddick
- (Belarus) Ruslan Salei
- (Russia) Alexei Yashin
- (Latvia) Sergei Zholtok

== Season-by-season record ==
Note: GP = Games played, W = Wins, L = Losses, T = Ties, OTL = Overtime losses, Pts = Points, GF = Goals for, GA = Goals against, PIM = Penalties in minutes

| Turner Cup Champions | Huber Trophy Champions | Division champions |

| Season | Conference | Division | Regular Season | | | | | | | | Post Season | | | | | |
| Season | Conference | Division | Finish | GP | W | L | T | Pts | GF | GA | GP | W | L | GF | GA | Result |
|---|---|---|---|---|---|---|---|---|---|---|---|---|---|---|---|---|
| 1993–94 | Western | Pacific | 1st | 81 | 52 | 18 | 11 | 115 | 319 | 282 | 5 | 1 | 4 | 14 | 20 | Lost in Quarterfinals, 1-4 (San Diego) |
| 1994–95 | Western | Southwest | 2nd | 81 | 46 | 30 | 5 | 97 | 328 | 278 | 10 | 4 | 6 | 27 | 35 | Won in Conference Quarterfinals, 3-1 (Atlanta); Won in Conference Semifinals, 4-1 (Milwaukee); Lost in Conference Finals 0-4 (Denver Grizzlies) |
| 1995–96 | Western | Southwest | 1st | 82 | 57 | 17 | 8 | 122 | 380 | 249 | 15 | 9 | 6 | 59 | 53 | Won in Conference Quarterfinals, 3–1 (Phoenix); Won in Conference Semifinals, 4–1 (Chicago); Lost in Conference Finals, 2-4 (Utah) |
| 1996–97 | Western | Southwest | 4th | 82 | 41 | 34 | 7 | 89 | 287 | 299 | 3 | 0 | 3 | 4 | 9 | Lost in Conference Quarterfinals, 0-3 (Houston) |
| 1997–98 | Western | Southwest | 4th | 82 | 33 | 39 | 10 | 76 | 260 | 305 | 4 | 1 | 3 | 9 | 16 | Lost in Conference Quarterfinals, 1-3 (Long Beach) |
| 1998–99 | Western | Southwest | 4th | 82 | 35 | 39 | 8 | 78 | 247 | 307 | did not qualify | | | | | |
| Totals | | | | 490 | 264 | 177 | 49 | .589% | 1821 | 1720 | 37 | 15 | 22 | 113 | 133 | |

== Head coaches ==
- (Canada) Butch Goring 1993–94
- (Canada) Bob Strumm 1994–95
- (Canada) Chris McSorley 1995–98
- (Canada) Clint Malarchuk 1998–99

== Honors ==
Division titles : 2 – 1994, 1996
Turner Cups : 0
Regular Season Titles : 2 – 1994, 1996
