= Commissioner's Trophy (IHL) =

The Commissioner's Trophy was awarded annually by the International Hockey League to the head coach who was judged to have contributed the most to his team's success.

== Winners ==
| Season | Winner | Team |
|---|---|---|
| 1984-85 | Pat Kelly | Peoria Rivermen |
| 1984-85 | Rick Ley | Muskegon Lumberjacks |
| 1985-86 | Rob Laird | Fort Wayne Komets |
| 1986-87 | Wayne Thomas | Salt Lake Golden Eagles |
| 1987-88 | Rick Dudley | Flint Spirits |
| 1988-89 | Blair MacDonald & Phil Russell | Muskegon Lumberjacks |
| 1989-90 | Darryl Sutter | Indianapolis Ice |
| 1990-91 | Bob Plager | Peoria Rivermen |
| 1991-92 | Kevin Constantine | Kansas City Blades |
| 1992-93 | Al Sims | Fort Wayne Komets |
| 1993-94 | Bruce Boudreau | Fort Wayne Komets |
| 1994-95 | Butch Goring | Denver Grizzlies |
| 1995-96 | Butch Goring | Utah Grizzlies |
| 1996-97 | John Van Boxmeer | Long Beach Ice Dogs |
| 1997-98 | John Torchetti | Fort Wayne Komets |
| 1998-99 | Dave Tippett | Houston Aeros |
| 1999-00 | Guy Charron | Grand Rapids Griffins |
| 2000-01 | Peter Horachek | Orlando Solar Bears |
