= Mike MacWilliam =

Canadian ice hockey player

- Born: February 14, 1967 (age 58); Burnaby, British Columbia, Canada
- Height: 6 ft 4 in (193 cm)
- Weight: 225 lb (102 kg; 16 st 1 lb)
- Position: Left wing
- Shot: Left
- Played for: New York Islanders
- NHL draft: Undrafted
- Playing career: 1988–1999

Mike MacWilliam (born February 14, 1967) is a Canadian former professional ice hockey winger who played in several leagues throughout his career including the WHL, AHL, IHL, and NHL. He grew up playing minor hockey in Burnaby.

MacWilliam played six games in the National Hockey League with the New York Islanders in the 1995–96 season.

== Career statistics ==
			Regular season					Playoffs
Season	Team	League	GP	G	A	Pts	PIM	GP	G	A	Pts	PIM
1984–85	Langley Eagles	BCJHL	13	2	1	3	63	—	—	—	—	—
1984–85	Kamloops Blazers	WHL	3	0	0	0	4	—	—	—	—	—
1984–85	New Westminster Bruins	WHL	5	0	0	0	5	—	—	—	—	—
1985–86	New Westminster Bruins	WHL	52	8	6	14	98	—	—	—	—	—
1986–87	New Westminster Bruins	WHL	40	6	14	20	134	—	—	—	—	—
1986–87	Medicine Hat Tigers	WHL	4	1	3	4	0	19	1	0	1	35
1988–89	Milwaukee Admirals	IHL	6	1	1	2	28	1	0	0	0	0
1988–89	Flint Spirits	IHL	18	0	0	0	92	—	—	—	—	—
1990–91	Adirondack Red Wings	AHL	8	0	0	0	32	—	—	—	—	—
1990–91	Greensboro Monarchs	ECHL	15	2	7	9	94	9	3	1	4	118
1991–92	St. John's Maple Leafs	AHL	44	7	8	15	301	2	0	0	0	8
1992–93	Greensboro Monarchs	ECHL	12	5	5	10	137	—	—	—	—	—
1993–94	Tulsa Oilers	CHL	39	16	12	28	326	8	4	0	4	88
1994–95	Denver Grizzlies	IHL	30	5	6	11	218	12	2	2	4	56
1995–96	New York Islanders	NHL	6	0	0	0	14	—	—	—	—	—
1995–96	Utah Grizzlies	IHL	53	8	16	24	317	6	0	2	2	53
1996–97	Phoenix Roadrunners	IHL	29	1	3	4	169	—	—	—	—	—
1997–98	Cardiff Devils	BISL	27	4	0	4	82	9	3	1	4	16
1998–99	Cardiff Devils	BISL	32	7	10	17	141	8	0	0	0	51
NHL totals			6	0	0	0	14	—	—	—	—	—
AHL totals			52	7	8	15	333	2	0	0	0	8
IHL totals			136	15	26	41	824	19	2	4	6	109
