= Mike Tomlak =

Canadian ice hockey player

- Born: October 17, 1964 (age 61) Thunder Bay, ON, CAN
- Height: 6 ft 3 in (191 cm)
- Weight: 205 lb (93 kg; 14 st 9 lb)
- Position: Centre
- Shot: Left
- Played for: Hartford Whalers
- National team: Canada
- NHL draft: 208th overall, 1983; Toronto Maple Leafs
- Playing career: 1989–1999

Michael Ronald Tomlak (born October 17, 1964 in Thunder Bay, Ontario) is a former professional ice hockey centre who played four seasons for the Hartford Whalers of the National Hockey League.

Tomlak was drafted 208th overall by the Toronto Maple Leafs in the 1983 NHL entry draft. He played 141 career NHL games, scoring 15 goals and 22 assists for 37 points.

== Career statistics ==
			Regular season					Playoffs
Season	Team	League	GP	G	A	Pts	PIM	GP	G	A	Pts	PIM
1982–83	Cornwall Royals	OHL	70	18	49	67	26	8	2	5	7	0
1983–84	Cornwall Royals	OHL	64	24	64	88	21	3	1	3	4	2
1984–85	Cornwall Royals	OHL	66	30	70	100	9	9	3	7	10	9
1985–86	University of Western Ontario	CIAU	38	28	20	48	45	—	—	—	—	—
1986–87	University of Western Ontario	CIAU	38	16	30	46	10	—	—	—	—	—
1987–88	University of Western Ontario	CIAU	39	24	52	76	—	—	—	—	—	—
1988–89	University of Western Ontario	CIAU	35	16	34	50	—	—	—	—	—	—
1989–90	Hartford Whalers	NHL	70	7	14	21	48	7	0	1	1	2
1990–91	Hartford Whalers	NHL	64	8	8	16	55	3	0	0	0	2
1990–91	Springfield Indians	AHL	15	4	9	13	15	—	—	—	—	—
1991–92	Hartford Whalers	NHL	6	0	0	0	0	—	—	—	—	—
1991–92	Springfield Indians	AHL	39	16	21	37	24	—	—	—	—	—
1992–93	Springfield Indians	AHL	38	16	21	37	24	—	—	—	—	—
1993–94	Hartford Whalers	NHL	1	0	0	0	0	—	—	—	—	—
1993–94	Springfield Indians	AHL	79	44	56	100	53	4	2	5	7	4
1994–95	Milwaukee Admirals	IHL	63	27	41	68	54	15	4	5	9	8
1995–96	Milwaukee Admirals	IHL	82	11	32	43	68	5	0	2	2	6
1996–97	Milwaukee Admirals	IHL	47	8	23	31	44	—	—	—	—	—
1997–98	Milwaukee Admirals	IHL	82	19	32	51	62	10	1	3	4	10
1998–99	HDD Olimpija Ljubljana	Slovenia	31	11	20	31	46	—	—	—	—	—
NHL totals			141	15	22	37	103	10	0	1	1	4
AHL totals			171	80	107	187	148	9	3	6	9	6
IHL totals			274	65	128	193	228	30	5	10	15	24
