= 1995–96 IHL season =

North American ice hockey season

1995-96 IHL season
- League: International Hockey League
- Sport: Ice hockey
- Games: 82
- Teams: 19

Regular season
- Fred A. Huber Trophy: Las Vegas Thunder
- Season MVP: Stephane Beauregard (Spiders)
- Top scorer: Rob Brown (Wolves)

Playoffs
- Playoffs MVP: Tommy Salo (Grizzlies)

Turner Cup
- Champions: Utah Grizzlies
- Runners-up: Orlando Solar Bears

Seasons
- ← 1994–95 1996–97 →

The 1995–96 IHL season was the 51st season of the International Hockey League, a North American minor professional league. 19 teams participated in the regular season, and the Utah Grizzlies won the Turner Cup.

== Regular season ==
=== Eastern Conference ===
| Central | GP | W | L | T | OTL | GF | GA | Pts |
|---|---|---|---|---|---|---|---|---|
| Orlando Solar Bears | 82 | 52 | 24 | 0 | 6 | 352 | 307 | 110 |
| Detroit Vipers | 82 | 48 | 28 | 0 | 6 | 310 | 274 | 102 |
| Cleveland Lumberjacks | 82 | 43 | 27 | 0 | 12 | 334 | 330 | 98 |
| Atlanta Knights | 82 | 32 | 41 | 0 | 9 | 282 | 348 | 73 |
| Houston Aeros | 82 | 29 | 45 | 0 | 8 | 262 | 328 | 66 |

| North | GP | W | L | T | OTL | GF | GA | Pts |
|---|---|---|---|---|---|---|---|---|
| Cincinnati Cyclones | 82 | 51 | 22 | 0 | 9 | 318 | 247 | 111 |
| Michigan K-Wings | 82 | 40 | 24 | 0 | 18 | 290 | 272 | 98 |
| Indianapolis Ice | 82 | 43 | 33 | 0 | 6 | 304 | 295 | 92 |
| Fort Wayne Komets | 82 | 39 | 35 | 0 | 8 | 276 | 296 | 86 |

=== Western Conference ===
| Midwest | GP | W | L | T | OTL | GF | GA | Pts |
|---|---|---|---|---|---|---|---|---|
| Milwaukee Admirals | 82 | 40 | 32 | 0 | 10 | 290 | 307 | 90 |
| Chicago Wolves | 82 | 40 | 34 | 0 | 8 | 288 | 310 | 88 |
| Peoria Rivermen | 82 | 39 | 38 | 0 | 5 | 274 | 290 | 83 |
| Kansas City Blades | 82 | 39 | 38 | 0 | 5 | 288 | 326 | 83 |
| Minnesota Moose | 82 | 30 | 45 | 0 | 7 | 254 | 332 | 67 |

| South | GP | W | L | T | OTL | GF | GA | Pts |
|---|---|---|---|---|---|---|---|---|
| Las Vegas Thunder | 82 | 57 | 17 | 0 | 8 | 380 | 249 | 122 |
| Utah Grizzlies | 82 | 49 | 29 | 0 | 4 | 291 | 232 | 102 |
| San Francisco Spiders | 82 | 40 | 32 | 0 | 10 | 278 | 283 | 90 |
| Phoenix Roadrunners | 82 | 36 | 35 | 0 | 11 | 267 | 281 | 83 |
| Los Angeles Ice Dogs | 82 | 32 | 36 | 0 | 14 | 305 | 336 | 78 |

== Turner Cup playoffs ==
Conf. quarterfinals
E1 | Cincinnati | 3
E8 | Atlanta | 0
E4 | Cleveland | 0
E5 | Michigan | 3
E2 | Orlando | 3
E7 | Fort Wayne | 2
E3 | Detroit | 3
E6 | Indianapolis | 2
W1 | Las Vegas | 3
W8 | Phoenix | 1
W4 | San Francisco | 1
W5 | Chicago | 3
W2 | Utah | 3
W7 | Kansas City | 2
W3 | Milwaukee | 2
W6 | Peoria | 3

Conf. semifinals
E1 | Cincinnati | 4
E5 | Michigan | 3
E2 | Orlando | 4
E3 | Detroit | 3
W1 | Las Vegas | 4
W5 | Chicago | 1
W2 | Utah | 4
W6 | Peoria | 3

Conf. finals
E1 | Cincinnati | 3
E2 | Orlando | 4
W1 | Las Vegas | 2
W2 | Utah | 4

Turner Cup finals
E2 | Orlando | 0
W2 | Utah | 4

== Awards ==
1996 IHL awards
| Turner Cup | Utah Grizzlies |
| Fred A. Huber Trophy: (Best regular-season record) | Las Vegas Thunder |
| Frank Gallagher Trophy: (Eastern Conference playoff champion) | Orlando Solar Bears |
| Ken Ullyot Trophy: (Western Conference playoff champion) | Utah Grizzlies |
| Commissioner's Trophy: (Best coach) | Butch Goring, Utah Grizzlies |
| Gary F. Longman Memorial Trophy: (Best first-year player) | Konstantin Shafranov, Fort Wayne Komets |
| Governor's Trophy: (Best defenceman) | Greg Hawgood, Las Vegas Thunder |
| I. John Snider, II Trophy: (Leadership and humanitarian contribution) | Graeme Townshend, Houston Aeros |
| Ironman Award: (Best two-way player over 82 games) | Sergei Zholtok, Las Vegas Thunder |
| James Gatschene Memorial Trophy: (Most valuable player, regular season) | Stephane Beauregard, San Francisco Spiders |
| James Norris Memorial Trophy: (Goaltenders with fewest goals allowed) | Tommy Salo and Mark McArthur, Utah Grizzlies |
| Ken McKenzie Trophy: (Best U.S.-born first-year player) | Brett Lievers, Utah Grizzlies |
| Leo P. Lamoureux Memorial Trophy: (Player with most points) | Rob Brown, Chicago Wolves |
| Norman R. "Bud" Poile Trophy: (Most valuable player, playoffs) | Tommy Salo, Utah Grizzlies |
