= Tommy Salo =

Swedish ice hockey player (born 1971)

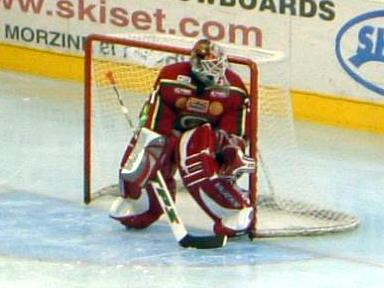
- Tommy Salo with Frölunda HC in August 2005
- Born: 1 February 1971 (age 55) Surahammar, Sweden
- Height: 6 ft 0 in (183 cm)
- Weight: 180 lb (82 kg; 12 st 12 lb)
- Position: Goaltender
- Caught: Left
- Played for: Elitserien; Västerås IK; Modo Hockey; Frölunda HC; NHL; New York Islanders; Edmonton Oilers; Colorado Avalanche
- National team: Sweden
- NHL draft: 118th overall, 1993; New York Islanders
- Playing career: 1990–2007
Medal record
Representing Sweden
Ice hockey
Olympic Games
Gold medal – first place	1994 Lillehammer
World Championships
Gold medal – first place	1998 Switzerland
Silver medal – second place	1997 Finland
Silver medal – second place	2003 Finland
Bronze medal – third place	1994 Italy
Bronze medal – third place	1999 Norway
Bronze medal – third place	2001 Germany
Bronze medal – third place	2002 Sweden

Tommy Mikael Salo (born 1 February 1971) is a Swedish former professional ice hockey goaltender and the current general manager of Leksands IF of the Swedish Hockey League (SHL). He previously played in the National Hockey League (NHL) for the New York Islanders, Edmonton Oilers and Colorado Avalanche, and previously served as head coach of IK Oskarshamn.

== Playing career ==
Salo began his career playing three seasons in the Elitserien with Västerås IK. He was chosen 118th overall, in the fifth round, by the New York Islanders in 1993. He debuted with the Islanders in 1994–95, but would play the majority of his first two seasons in North America with New York's International Hockey League (IHL) affiliate, the Utah Grizzlies. Playing in the IHL, Salo won back-to-back Turner Cups with the Grizzlies as league champions and earned the N.R. "Bud" Poile Trophy as playoff MVP in 1996. In his first year, he was named both league MVP and rookie of the year in 1995, in addition to First Team All-Star honours and a James Norris Memorial Trophy for allowing the fewest goals against.

In 1996–97, Salo emerged as the Islanders' starting goaltender and played in that capacity for the club until March 20, 1999, when he was traded to the Edmonton Oilers in exchange for Mats Lindgren and an eighth-round pick in the 1999 NHL entry draft (used to select Radek Martínek). Salo found his stride in Edmonton and was chosen to two All-Star Games in 2000 and 2002. In 2001–02, Salo recorded a career-best 2.22 goals against average (GAA).

On March 9, 2004, after six seasons with Edmonton, Salo was traded to the Colorado Avalanche (along with a sixth-round pick in the 2004 NHL entry draft) in exchange for Tom Gilbert. As NHL play was suspended the following season due to the 2004–05 NHL lockout, Salo returned to Sweden in signing a one-year contract with Modo Hockey of the Elitserien.

After Modo was eliminated in the playoffs by Färjestad BK, Salo announced his retirement from professional hockey on March 17, 2005, citing chronic hip pain.

On December 9, 2006, in an interview with Swedish newspaper Expressen, Salo announced that he would retire from playing professional hockey after the 2006–07 season.

== International play ==
Salo first competed for Sweden in the 1991 World Junior Championships. He played in six games and posted a 3.32 GAA.

Several years later, he played an integral role in Sweden's gold medal victory at the 1994 Winter Olympics in Lillehammer, Norway. Salo made critical saves in the gold medal game, as they defeated Canada in a shootout to secure Sweden's first Olympic gold medal in ice hockey.

In 1998, Salo once again competed in the Winter Olympics, as NHL players were allowed to compete for the first time. He played in four games as Sweden failed to medal.

At the 2002 Winter Olympics, Salo started for Sweden once more and were favourites to win the gold medal, placing first in the round robin. However, in the quarter-final game against Belarus, with the game tied late in the third period, Salo surrendered a 20-metre goal from defenceman Vladimir Kopat. The long slap shot puck bounced off Salo's mask after he had hopped, went up in the air, and bounced off of his back and into the net. Sweden would not recover and Salo was made the scapegoat in one of the biggest upsets in international hockey history. Some would claim that Salo was never the same after the incident.

== Coaching and executive career ==
Shortly after completing his playing career, on March 5, 2007, Kungälvs IK of the Swedish tier III league announced that Salo would be their head coach for the next two seasons. Following his tenure with the club, he signed with IK Oskarshamn on March 12, 2009.

On December 1, 2010, Salo left his post at IK Oskarshamn to become general manager of Leksands IF.

== Legal issues ==
On 11 August 2020, Salo crashed his car into the middle railing on the E18 highway, east of Köping, Sweden. Police arrived to the scene and found Salo sleeping in his car. A blood sample showed that Salo was heavily intoxicated with .306 ‰ alcohol in his blood stream. On 20 January 2021, Salo was convicted of aggravated drunken driving and sentenced to two months in prison.

== Career statistics ==
=== Regular season and playoffs ===
			Regular season									Playoffs
Season	Team	League	GP	W	L	T	MIN	GA	SO	GAA	SV%	GP	W	L	MIN	GA	SO	GAA	SV%
1988–89	Surahammars IF	SWE.2 Jr	18	—	—	—	—	—	—	3.67	—	—	—	—	—	—	—	—	—
1988–89	Surahammars IF	SWE.2	1	—	—	—	60	5	0	5.00	.872	—	—	—	—	—	—	—	—
1989–90	Västerås IK	SWE U20	—	—	—	—	—	—	—	—	—	2	—	—	—	—	—	2.55	—
1990–91	Västerås IK	SEL	2	—	—	—	100	11	0	6.60	.851	—	—	—	—	—	—	—	—
1990–91	IK Westmannia-Köping	SWE.2	24	—	—	—	—	—	—	3.37	.879	—	—	—	—	—	—	—	—
1991–92	IK Westmannia-Köping	SWE.2	29	—	—	—	—	—	—	3.23	.882	3	—	—	—	—	—	3.33	.905
1992–93	Västerås IK	SEL	24	—	—	—	1431	59	2	2.46	.918	2	—	—	120	6	0	3.00	.895
1993–94	Västerås IK	SEL	32	—	—	—	1896	106	0	3.35	.885	4	—	—	—	—	0	4.75	.852
1994–95	Denver Grizzlies	IHL	65	45	14	4	3810	165	3	2.60	.910	8	7	0	390	20	0	3.07	.890
1994–95	New York Islanders	NHL	6	1	5	0	358	18	0	3.02	.905	—	—	—	—	—	—	—	—
1995–96	Utah Grizzlies	IHL	45	28	15	2	2695	119	4	2.65	.902	22	15	7	1341	51	3	2.28	.919
1995–96	New York Islanders	NHL	10	1	7	1	523	35	0	4.02	.860	—	—	—	—	—	—	—	—
1996–97	New York Islanders	NHL	58	20	27	8	3208	151	5	2.82	.904	—	—	—	—	—	—	—	—
1997–98	New York Islanders	NHL	62	23	29	5	3461	152	4	2.64	.906	—	—	—	—	—	—	—	—
1998–99	New York Islanders	NHL	51	17	26	7	3018	132	5	2.62	.904	—	—	—	—	—	—	—	—
1998–99	Edmonton Oilers	NHL	13	8	2	2	700	27	0	2.31	.903	4	0	4	296	11	0	2.23	.926
1999–00	Edmonton Oilers	NHL	70	27	28	13	4164	162	2	2.33	.914	5	1	4	297	14	0	2.83	.895
2000–01	Edmonton Oilers	NHL	73	36	25	12	4364	179	8	2.46	.904	6	2	4	406	15	0	2.22	.920
2001–02	Edmonton Oilers	NHL	69	30	28	10	4035	149	6	2.22	.913	—	—	—	—	—	—	—	—
2002–03	Edmonton Oilers	NHL	65	29	27	8	3814	172	4	2.71	.899	6	2	4	343	18	0	3.15	.888
2003–04	Edmonton Oilers	NHL	44	17	18	6	2487	107	3	2.58	.896	—	—	—	—	—	—	—	—
2003–04	Colorado Avalanche	NHL	5	1	3	1	304	12	0	2.37	.912	1	0	0	27	0	0	0.00	1.000
2004–05	Modo Hockey	SEL	36	16	15	5	2165	93	0	2.58	.909	6	2	4	358	19	1	3.18	.888
2005–06	Frölunda HC	SEL	37	25	10	1	2189	90	0	2.47	.911	17	10	7	1019	40	1	2.35	.920
2006–07	Frölunda HC	SEL	22	6	12	3	1277	70	1	3.29	.875	—	—	—	—	—	—	—	—
SEL totals			153	—	—	—	9058	429	3	2.84	—	29	—	—	—	—	2	—	—
NHL totals			526	210	225	73	30,436	1296	37	2.55	.905	22	5	16	1369	58	0	2.54	.909

=== International ===
Year	Team	Event	GP	W	L	T	MIN	GA	SO	GAA	SV%
1991	Sweden	WJC	6	3	3	0	343	19	1	3.32	—
1994	Sweden	OLY	6	5	1	0	370	13	1	2.11	.896
1994	Sweden	WC	3	1	1	1	180	10	0	3.33	.846
1996	Sweden	WCH	2	1	1	0	160	4	0	1.50	.937
1997	Sweden	WC	10	6	3	1	597	20	1	2.00	.918
1998	Sweden	OLY	4	2	2	0	238	9	0	2.27	.918
1998	Sweden	WC	9	9	0	0	540	7	3	0.77	.951
1999	Sweden	WC	8	—	—	—	424	13	0	1.84	.921
2000	Sweden	WC	6	3	3	0	359	10	1	1.67	.922
2001	Sweden	WC	8	—	—	—	494	16	2	1.94	.920
2002	Sweden	OLY	3	2	1	0	179	7	0	2.35	.924
2002	Sweden	WC	9	—	—	—	429	14	1	1.96	.919
2003	Sweden	WC	3	1	0	1	145	10	0	4.15	.861
2004	Sweden	WCH	1	1	0	0	60	2	0	2.00	.895
Senior totals			69	34	15	3	4030	125	9	1.86	—

== Awards ==
International

- Won a Channel One Cup/Izvestia Trophy bronze medal with Sweden in 1993.
- Won a Winter Olympic gold medal with Sweden in 1994.
- Won a World Championships gold medal with Sweden at the 1998 Men's World Ice Hockey Championships.
- Won a World Championships silver medal with Sweden at the 1997 Men's World Ice Hockey Championships.
- Won a World Championships bronze medal with Sweden at the 1994 Men's World Ice Hockey Championships.
- Won a World Championships bronze medal with Sweden at the 1999 Men's World Ice Hockey Championships.
- Won a World Championships bronze medal with Sweden at the 2001 Men's World Ice Hockey Championships.
- Won a World Championships bronze medal with Sweden at the 2002 Men's World Ice Hockey Championships.
- Won a World Championships silver medal with Sweden at the 2003 Men's World Ice Hockey Championships.
- Won a World Cup of Hockey bronze medal with Sweden at the first World Cup of Hockey in 1996.
- IIHF - World Cup's Best Goalkeeper 1997, 1998, 1999.
- IIHF - The World Championships All Star Team Act 1997, 1998, 1999.
- IIHF - World Cup's best goalkeeper points in 1998 - 95.9
- Swedish All-Star Team 1994, 1996, 1997, 1998, 1999, 2000, 2001, 2002, 2003, 2004.
- Tre Kronor's First Guard 1994-2004.
- All tournaments with Tre Kronor: WJC 1991, IZVESTIA TROPHY/CHANNEL ONE CUP 1993, OS 1994, VM 1994, World Cup of Hockey 1996, VM 1997, OS 1998, VM 1998, VM 1999, VM 2000, VM 2001, OS 2002, VM 2002, VM 2003, World Cup of Hockey 2004.
- Internationals: 112 A, 27 B, 16 C.
- One of his greatest achievements in Tre Kronor was when he made a decisive penalty save in the final against Canada in the 1994 Olympics in Lillehammer, which led to Sweden's first Olympic gold.
- He is also one of the few who received six wasps by the Swedish newspaper Expressen, after holding zero in Sweden's two final matches against Finland in 1998.
- He is the only Swedish goalkeeper to have played in three Olympic tournament series in 1994, 1998, 2002.

IHL

- Won the James Gatschene Memorial Trophy (league MVP) in 1995.
- Won the James Norris Memorial Trophy (fewest goals against) in 1995 and in 1996.
- Won the Gary F. Longman Memorial Trophy (rookie of the year) in 1995.
- Named to the First All-Star Team in 1994 and 1995.
- Won a Turner Cup (league championship) with the Denver Grizzlies in 1995 and Utah Grizzlies in 1996.
- Won the N.R. "Bud" Poile Trophy (Playoff MVP) in 1996.

NHL

- Won the Zane Feldman Trophy–Edmonton Oilers MVP in 1999, 2000, 2001, 2002.
- Ranked third in Edmonton Oilers-Goalies All-Time NHL Leaders Games played - 334 1998–04.
- Ranked third in Edmonton Oilers-Goalies All-Time NHL Win Leaders with - 147 Wins 1998-04.
- Ranked second in Edmonton Oilers-Goalies All-Time NHL Losses Leaders with - 128 Losses 1998-04.
- Ranked third in Edmonton Oilers-Goalies All-Time NHL Leaders Goals Against - 796 1998-04.
- Ranked third in Edmonton Oilers-Goalies All-Time NHL Leaders Shots Against - 8,455 1998-04.
- Ranked third in Edmonton Oilers-Goalies All-Time NHL Leaders Saves - 7,659 1998-04.
- Ranked fourth in Edmonton Oilers-Goalies All-Time NHL Leaders Highest Save Percentage (minimum 2,000 shots) - .906 1998-04.
- Ranked one in Edmonton Oilers-Goalies All-Time NHL Leaders Shutouts - 23 1998-04.
- Ranked third in Edmonton Oilers-Goalies All-Time NHL Leaders Minutes - 19,564 1998-04.
- Single-season Leaders shutouts in a season: 8, (2000–01) 6, (2001–02) Ranked one and fourth in Edmonton Oilers
- Single-season Leaders Games Played in a season: 73, (2000–01) Ranked second in Edmonton Oilers
- Single-season Leaders Wins in a season: 36, (2000–01) Ranked third in Edmonton Oilers
- Single-season Leaders Lowest Goals Against Average (minimum 2,000 minutes) in a season: 2.22, (2001–02) 2.33, (1999–2000) 2.46, (2000–01) Ranked one and second and fifth in Edmonton Oilers
- Single-season Leaders Minutes in a season: 4,364, (2000–01) 4,164, (1999–2000) Ranked one and fourth in Edmonton Oilers
- All-time post-season Leaders Goaltenders Games played 21, (1998–01 2002–03) Ranked fifth in Edmonton Oilers
- All-time post-season Leaders Goaltenders Losses 16, (1998–01 2002–03) Ranked second in Edmonton Oilers
- Played in the NHL All-Star Game in 2000 and 2002.
- NHL Career Shutouts - 37.
- Named NHL Player of the Week on March 25, 2002 and March 10, 2003.
- Won the Molson Cup in 1999, 2000, 2001, 2002.
- NHL-drafted By New York Islanders, 5th round, 14th pick, (118th overall) in NHL entry draft 1993.

Elitserien

- Won a silver medal with the Frölunda Indians in 2006.
- Internally voted as the best Frölunda player 2005/2006.
- Frölunda HC ECC 2005/2006
- Best goalkeeper Elitserien 1993.
- Elitserien best goalkeeper Save percentage points 1993 - 91.8
- Junior 20-SM-Gold 1990.
- TV-Pucken: 1986
- Stora Grabbars Märke number 158.
- Elected as number 59 in the Swedish Hockey Hall of Fame in 2013.

== Records ==
- Edmonton Oilers franchise record; lowest goals against average, career - 2.40 (minimum 4,000 minutes).
