= Utah Grizzlies (1995–2005) =

- City: Denver, Colorado; Salt Lake City, Utah; West Valley City, Utah
- League: IHL (1994–2001); AHL (2001–2005)
- Founded: 1994 (In the IHL)
- Operated: 1994–1995 as the Denver Grizzlies; 1995–2005 as the Utah Grizzlies
- Home arena: McNichols Sports Arena (1994–1995); Delta Center (1995–1997); E Center (1997–2005)
- Colors: Maroon, black, white
- Affiliates: New York Islanders (1994–98); Dallas Stars (2000–04); Phoenix Coyotes (2004–05)

Franchise history
- 1994–1995: Denver Grizzlies
- 1995–2005: Utah Grizzlies
- 2007–2016: Lake Erie Monsters
- 2016–present: Cleveland Monsters

Championships
- Regular season titles: 1 (1994–95)
- Division titles: 1 (1994–95)
- Turner Cups: 2 (1994–95, 1995–96)

The Utah Grizzlies were an ice hockey team in the International Hockey League (IHL) and American Hockey League (AHL). They originally played at the Delta Center in Salt Lake City, before relocating to the E Center in the Salt Lake City suburb of West Valley City in 1997. After the 2004–05 season, the franchise was suspended. It was sold in 2006 by Elmore Sports Group to Dan Gilbert and moved to Cleveland, where it returned to play in 2007 as the Lake Erie (later Cleveland) Monsters. A new Utah Grizzlies franchise in the ECHL began play in 2005.

== History ==
Doug Doull plays for the Grizzlies in 2004.

The original Utah Grizzlies moved to Utah in 1995 after one IHL season in Denver, Colorado, as the NHL's Quebec Nordiques relocated to Denver to become the Colorado Avalanche. The Grizzlies were admitted to the AHL in 2001 after the IHL folded. They played their home games in the Delta Center until the E Center was built a few seasons after they arrived in Salt Lake.

While in Denver, the Grizzlies won the 1994–95 Turner Cup, the IHL championship. After relocating to the Salt Lake City area, the Utah Grizzlies once again marched to victory in the IHL playoffs. Utah swept the Orlando Solar Bears in four games to win the 1995–96 Turner Cup. The fourth (and final) game of the series was played in the Delta Center; 17,381 fans attended, which, at the time, set a national record for largest attendance at a minor league ice hockey game.

The franchise was granted a voluntary suspension for the 2005–06 season, and on May 16, 2006, it was sold to an ownership group from Cleveland led by Dan Gilbert, the owner of the Cleveland Cavaliers and Quicken Loans. The franchise was moved to Cleveland to replace the departed Cleveland Barons and resumed play in 2007 as the Lake Erie Monsters.

After the suspension of the IHL/AHL Grizzlies, a new ownership group purchased the Utah Grizzlies identity and resurrected a team of the same name in the ECHL that started playing in the 2005–06 season.

The NHL would eventually place a team in Salt Lake City with the Utah Mammoth, who play at the Grizzlies' old home of Delta Center.

=== Market facts ===
The Salt Lake City market was previously served by:

- Salt Lake Golden Eagles of the WHL (1969–74)
- Salt Lake Golden Eagles of the CHL (1974–84)
- Salt Lake Golden Eagles of the IHL (1984–94)

The franchise was replaced by:

- Utah Grizzlies of the ECHL (2005–present)

== Affiliates ==
- New York Islanders (1995–98)
- Dallas Stars (2000–04)
- Phoenix Coyotes (2004–05)

== Season-by-season results ==
- Denver Grizzlies 1994–95 (International Hockey League)
- Utah Grizzlies 1995–2001 (International Hockey League)
- Utah Grizzlies 2001–05 (American Hockey League)

Regular season											Playoffs					
Season	GP	W	L	T	OTL	SOL	Pts	GF	GA	Standing	Year	Prelim	1st round	2nd round	3rd round	Finals
1994–95	81	57	18	—	6	—	120	339	235	1st, Southwest	1995	—	W, 3–0, MIN	W, 4–1, PHX	W, 4–1, MIL	W, 4–0, KC
1995–96	82	49	29	—	4	—	102	291	232	2nd, Southwest	1996	—	W, 3–2, KC	W, 4–3, PEO	W, 4–2, LV	W, 4–0, ORL
1996–97	82	43	33	—	6	—	92	259	254	3rd, Southwest	1997	—	W, 3–0, KC	L, 0–4, LB	—	—
1997–98	82	47	27	—	8	—	102	276	234	3rd, Southwest	1998	—	L, 1–3, KC	—	—	—
1998–99	82	39	34	—	9	—	87	244	254	3rd, Southwest	1999	—	Did not qualify			
1999–00	82	45	25	—	12	—	102	265	220	2nd, West	2000	—	BYE	L, 1–4, HOU	—	—
2000–01	82	38	36	—	8	—	84	208	220	4th, West	2001	—	—	Did not qualify		
2001–02	80	40	29	6	5	—	91	240	225	3rd, West	2002	BYE	L, 2–3, HOU	—	—	—
2002–03	80	37	34	4	5	—	83	227	243	5th, West	2003	L, 0–2, WBS	—	—	—	—
2003–04	80	27	42	6	5	—	65	162	230	7th, West	2004	Did not qualify				
2004–05	80	23	50	5	2	—	53	156	265	7th, West	2005	—	Did not qualify			

== Team records ==
=== Single season ===
- Goals: 46 (United States) Kip Miller (1994–95)
- Assists: 60 (United States) Kip Miller (1994–95)
- Points: 106 (United States) Kip Miller (1994–95)
- Penalty minutes: 317 (Canada) Mike MacWilliam (1995–96)
- GAA: 2.21 (Canada) Rich Parent (1999–00)
- SV%: .928 (Canada) Wade Flaherty (2001–02)
- Wins: 45 (Sweden) Tommy Salo (1994–95)
- Shutouts: 5 (Canada) Mike Bales (2000–01)
- Goaltending records need a minimum 25 games played by the goaltender

=== Career ===
- Career goals: 111 (Canada) Chris Taylor (1994–98)
- Career assists: 167 (Canada) Chris Taylor
- Career points: 278 (Canada) Chris Taylor
- Career penalty minutes: 694 John Erskine (2000–03)
- Career goaltending wins: 73 (Sweden) Tommy Salo (1994–96)
- Career shutouts: 7 (Sweden) Tommy Salo
- Career games: 440 (Canada) Gord Dineen (1994–2000)
