= Len Thornson =

Canadian ice hockey player (1933–2021)

- Born: February 4, 1933 Winnipeg, Manitoba, Canada
- Died: December 12, 2021 (aged 88)
- Height: 6 ft 0 in (183 cm)
- Weight: 180 lb (82 kg; 12 st 12 lb)
- Position: Centre
- Shot: Left
- Played for: Buffalo Bisons; Indianapolis Chiefs; Huntington Hornets; Fort Wayne Komets
- Playing career: 1952–1969

Len Thornson (February 4, 1933 – December 12, 2021) was a Canadian ice hockey centre.

Born in Winnipeg, Manitoba, Canada, Thornson spent his entire professional hockey career in the International Hockey League, mostly with the Fort Wayne Komets. He also spent part of one season (1956–57) with the Indianapolis Chiefs and the Huntington Hornets. He is the IHL's all-time leading scorer with 1,252 career points.

Thornson died December 12, 2021, at the age of 88.

== Awards and achievements ==
- MJHL Second All-Star Team (1953)
- MJHL Goal Scoring Leader (1953)
- Turnbull Cup MJHL Championship (1953)
- IHL MVP (1959, 1961, 1963, 1964, 1967, & 1968)
- IHL Scoring Champion (1962, 1964, & 1967)
- Turner Cup (IHL) Championships (1963 & 1965)
- "Honoured Member" of the Manitoba Hockey Hall of Fame
- Jersey #11 retired by Fort Wayne Komets.
