= John Cullen Award =

Ice hockey award

The John Cullen Award was awarded annually by the International Hockey League to the player judged to contribute the most to his team, while overcoming adversity, including injury, illness, and other setbacks. The award was originally named the Comeback Player of the Year Award until 1999, when it was renamed after John Cullen, who overcame non-Hodgkin lymphoma.

== Winners ==
Comeback Player of the Year Award
Season	Player	Team
1996–97	Kevin Smyth	Orlando Solar Bears
1997–98	Mike Tomlak	Milwaukee Admirals
John Cullen Award
Season	Player	Team
1998–99	Jeff Christian	Houston Aeros
1999–00	Steve Larouche	Chicago Wolves
2000–01	Rusty Fitzgerald	Manitoba Moose
