= Detroit Vipers =

- City: Auburn Hills, Michigan
- League: International Hockey League
- Operated: 1994–2001
- Home arena: The Palace of Auburn Hills
- Colors: Green, white, red, black, eggplant, aqua
- Affiliates: Ottawa Senators (1997–1998); Tampa Bay Lightning (1999–2001)

Franchise history
- 1969–1994: Salt Lake Golden Eagles
- 1994–2001: Detroit Vipers

Championships
- Division titles: 4 (1994–95, 1996–97, 1997–98, 1998–99)
- Turner Cups: 1 (1997)

The Detroit Vipers were a professional ice hockey team that competed in the International Hockey League (IHL). Originally founded in 1969 as the Salt Lake Golden Eagles in Salt Lake City, the team was purchased by Palace Sports & Entertainment and relocated to Auburn Hills, Michigan in 1994. The rebranding to the Vipers was influenced by a sponsorship deal with the Chrysler Corporation, aligning the team's name with the company's popular Dodge Viper sports car.

In their first five seasons, the Vipers were highly successful, achieving 100 points each year and making two appearances in the Turner Cup Finals, winning the championship in 1997.

In 1999, Palace Sports acquired the Tampa Bay Lightning of the National Hockey League (NHL), and the Vipers became their top minor league affiliate. However, the team struggled over the next two seasons before both the Vipers and the IHL ceased operations in 2001.

== History ==
=== Beginning ===
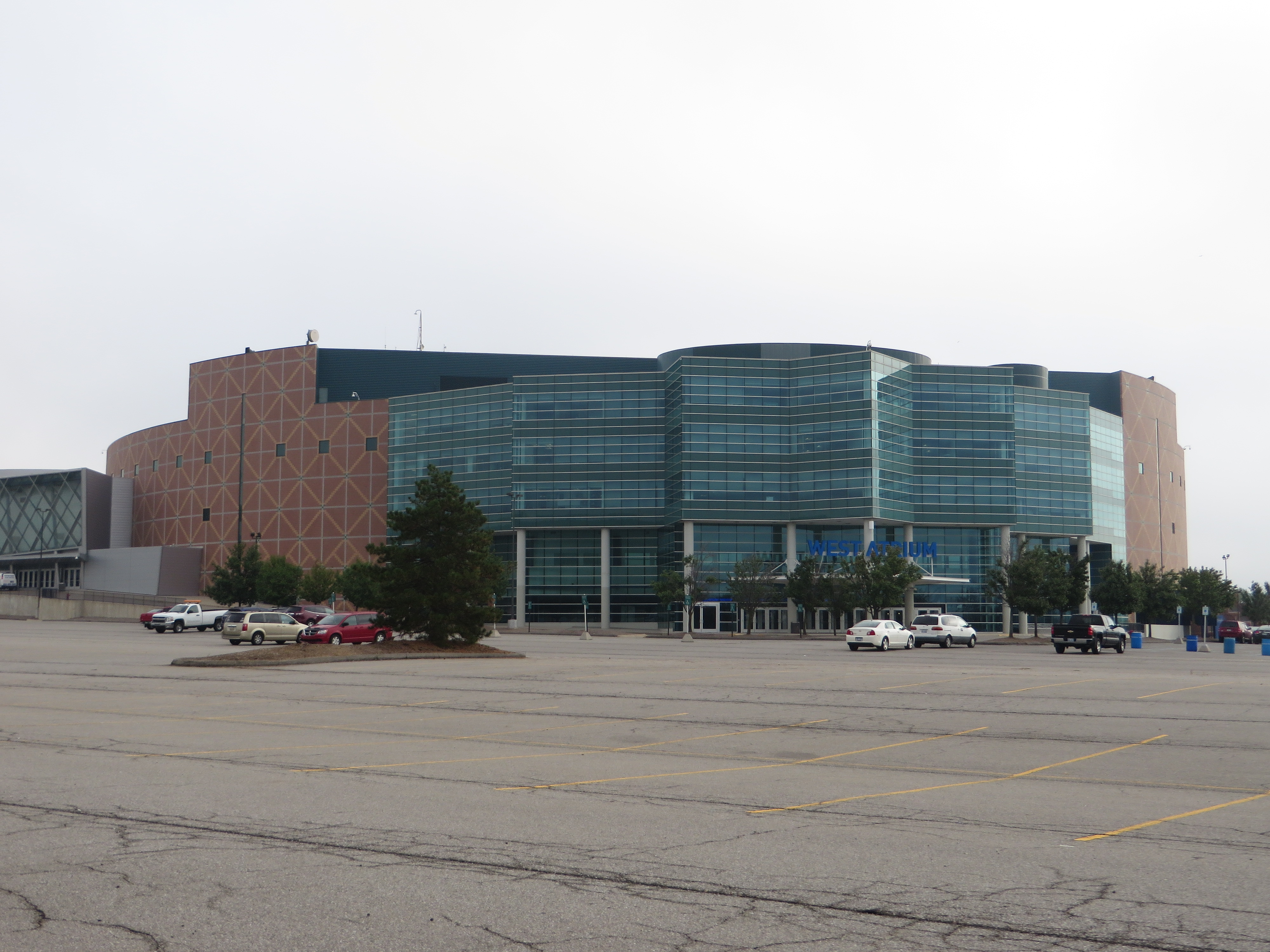
The Vipers played at the Palace of Auburn Hills from 1994 to 2001.

The Vipers were originally founded as the Salt Lake Golden Eagles in 1969. In 1994, the franchise was purchased by Palace Sports & Entertainment, owners of the Detroit Pistons and the Palace of Auburn Hills, and relocated for the 1994–95 IHL season. A sponsorship deal with Chrysler led to the naming of the team after their Dodge Viper. A similar deal was in place with another Palace Sports-owned team, the Detroit Neon of the Continental Indoor Soccer League (CISL), which switched its sponsorship to GMC in its final year and renamed the team the Detroit Safari after yet another vehicle, the Safari.

The team hired former Buffalo Sabres coach Rick Dudley as head coach and general manager. Their first season was during the 1994–95 NHL lockout. During said lockout, the Vipers took on the Ninety-Nines, an all-star team of locked-out National Hockey League players led by Wayne Gretzky. The Vipers won, 4–3. The team won the IHL's Central Division but were eliminated by the Kansas City Blades in five games in the first round of the playoffs.

The 1995–96 season saw the notable signing of Washington Capitals star Peter Bondra for a brief time while he was locked in a holdout with Washington management. The Vipers finished the season in second place in the Central Division. In the first round of the playoffs, they defeated the Indianapolis Ice in five games, but the Vipers lost their second round playoff series to the Orlando Solar Bears in seven games.

=== The Turner Cup Finals ===
During the off-season, Steve Ludzik succeeded Rick Dudley as head coach. This off-season also saw the arrival of Russian phenom Sergei Samsonov and IHL All-Star Stan Drulia to the Vipers. Samsonov won Rookie of the Year honors, while the Vipers won another division title. They advanced to their first appearance in the Turner Cup Finals against the Long Beach Ice Dogs. Led by Samsonov and Peter Ciavaglia, the Vipers won the series 4–2. That championship allowed Detroit to become the first city to capture two cups in the same calendar year as the Detroit Red Wings also won the Stanley Cup.

With Samsonov selected by the Boston Bruins with the eighth overall pick in the 1997 NHL entry draft, Dan Kesa scored 40 goals in 1997–98, as the Vipers won their third division title in four seasons. They also became the first professional hockey team to have 100 points in each of their first four seasons. The Vipers advanced to the Turner Cup Finals against the Chicago Wolves. After going up 3–2, the Vipers only scored one goal in the final two games, losing the series 4–3. The season also saw a one-shift comeback from Gordie Howe, making him the only person to play hockey in six different decades as a professional. Following the season, Rick Dudley left the team to become the general manager of the Ottawa Senators.

=== Demise ===
The 1998–99 season saw John Torchetti hired as general manager. The Vipers won another division title and advanced to the Eastern Conference Finals against the Orlando Solar Bears. The Vipers became the first and only team in IHL history to lose a best-of-seven playoff series after being up 3–0. During the off-season, Palace Sports & Entertainment purchased the Tampa Bay Lightning and made the Vipers their top minor league affiliate. As a result, Steve Ludzik was promoted as Lightning head coach in an effort by ownership to rebuild the struggling NHL club. Paulin Bordeleau took over as Vipers head coach.

The Lightning remained barely competitive, prompting a mass transfer of talent from Detroit to Tampa throughout the season. This drained the Vipers of the strength and stability that they had experienced through the first five seasons of their existence. It also led to a swift, sudden and near-total collapse; the Vipers plummeted from having the second-best record a season prior to being dead last in the league.

The Vipers' woes were nothing, however, compared to the worsening health of the IHL as the league was experiencing high travel costs, salary issues, and an inability to establish a sustainable relationship with the NHL. By the 2000–01 season, the Vipers were only one of eleven IHL teams still remaining. That season saw Brad Shaw take over as head coach. However, the Vipers finished dead last in the league in both the standings and attendance. The impending demise of the IHL, combined with the plummeting attendance, led Palace Sports to find a new affiliate for the Lightning.

On June 4, 2001, both the IHL and the Vipers ceased operations.

== Players ==
=== Notable players ===
- Peter Bondra
- Phil Bourque
- Jimmy Carson
- Peter Ciavaglia
- Dan Cloutier
- John Craighead
- Stan Drulia
- Gerard Gallant
- Ian Herbers
- Johan Hedberg
- Gordie Howe
- Dan Kesa
- Lonnie Loach
- Michal Pivonka
- Wayne Presley
- Sami Salo
- Sergei Samsonov
- Miroslav Satan
- Brad Shaw
- Bryan Smolinski
- Petr Sykora
- Tim Thomas
- Kevin Weekes
- Jason Woolley
