= IHL Man of the Year =

The IHL Man of the Year was awarded annually by the International Hockey League to the player who displays the most charitable and educational leadership in the community. The award was awarded from 1993 to 2001, also known as the I. John Snider, II Trophy.

== Winners ==
Season	Winner	Team
1992-93	Robbie Nichols	San Diego Gulls
1993-94	Terry Ficorelli	non-player
1994-95	Mike MacWilliam	Denver Grizzlies
1995-96	Graeme Townshend	Houston Aeros
1996-97	Tim Breslin	Chicago Wolves
1997-98	Rod Miller	Utah Grizzlies
1998-99	Chris Marinucci	Chicago Wolves
1999-00	Pat MacLeod	Cincinnati Cyclones
2000-01	Wendell Young	Chicago Wolves
