= James Gatschene Memorial Trophy =

The James Gatschene Memorial Trophy was awarded annually to the International Hockey League player selected as most valuable through his display of outstanding playing ability and sportsmanlike conduct over the course of the regular season, as chosen by the league coaches.

The trophy was first presented at the close of the 1946–1947 season by workers of the Chrysler factory in Windsor, Ontario, as a memorial to Gatschene, a former Chrysler employee and hockey star in the Windsor-Detroit area. Gatschene was a member of the Canadian Forces, killed in action during World War II.

== Winners ==
Season	Winner	Team
1946-47	Herb Jones	Detroit Auto Club
1947-48	Lyle Dowell	Detroit Bright's Goodyears
1948-49	Bob McFadden	Detroit Jerry Lynch
1949-50	Dick Kowcinak	Sarnia Sailors
1950-51	John McGrath	Toledo Mercurys
1951-52	Ernie Dick	Chatham Maroons
1952-53	Don Marshall	Cincinnati Mohawks
1953-54	no award	
1954-55	Phil Goyette	Cincinnati Mohawks
1955-56	George Hayes	Grand Rapids Rockets
1956-57	Pierre Brillant	Indianapolis Chiefs
1957-58	Pierre Brillant	Indianapolis Chiefs
1958-59	Len Thornson	Fort Wayne Komets
1959-60	Billy Reichart	Minneapolis Millers
1960-61	Len Thornson	Fort Wayne Komets
1961-62	Eddie Long	Fort Wayne Komets
1962-63	Len Thornson	Fort Wayne Komets
1963-64	Len Thornson	Fort Wayne Komets
1964-65	William "Chick" Chalmers	Toledo Blades
1965-66	Gary Schall	Muskegon Mohawks
1966-67	Len Thornson	Fort Wayne Komets
1967-68	Don Westbrooke	Dayton Gems
1967-68	Len Thornson	Fort Wayne Komets
1968-69	Don Westbrooke	Dayton Gems
1969-70	Cliff Pennington	Des Moines Oak Leafs
1970-71	Lyle Carter	Muskegon Mohawks
1971-72	Len Fontaine	Port Huron Wings
1972-73	Gary Ford	Muskegon Mohawks
1973-74	Peter Mara	Des Moines Capitols
1974-75	Gary Ford	Muskegon Mohawks
1975-76	Len Fontaine	Port Huron Flags
1976-77	Tom Mellor	Toledo Goaldiggers
1977-78	Dan Bonar	Fort Wayne Komets
1978-79	Terry McDougall	Fort Wayne Komets
1979-80	Al Dumba	Fort Wayne Komets
1980-81	Marcel Comeau	Saginaw Gears
1981-82	Brent Jarrett	Kalamazoo Wings
1982-83	Claude Noel	Toledo Goaldiggers
1983-84	Darren Jensen	Fort Wayne Komets
1984-85	Scott Gruhl	Muskegon Mohawks
1985-86	Darrell May	Peoria Rivermen
1986-87	Jeff Pyle	Saginaw Generals
1986-87	Jock Callander	Muskegon Lumberjacks
1987-88	John Cullen	Flint Spirits
1988-89	Dave Michayluk	Muskegon Lumberjacks
1989-90	Michel Mongeau	Peoria Rivermen
1990-91	David Bruce	Peoria Rivermen
1991-92	Dmitri Kvartalnov	San Diego Gulls
1992-93	Tony Hrkac	Indianapolis Ice
1993-94	Rob Brown	Kalamazoo Wings
1994-95	Tommy Salo	Denver Grizzlies
1995-96	Stephane Beauregard	San Francisco Spiders
1996-97	Frederic Chabot	Houston Aeros
1997-98	Patrice Lefebvre	Las Vagas Thunder
1998-99	Brian Wiseman	Houston Aeros
1999-00	Frederic Chabot	Houston Aeros
1999-00	Nikolai Khabibulin	Long Beach Ice Dogs
2000-01	Norm Maracle	Orlando Solar Bears
