= Ironman Award =

The Ironman Award was awarded annually since 1989 by the International Hockey League to the player who played in all his team's games while displaying outstanding offensive and defensive abilities.

== Winners ==
Season	Winner	Team
1988-89	Michel Mongeau	Flint Spirits
1989-90	Bob Lakso	Fort Wayne Komets
1990-91	Jim Johannson	Indianapolis Ice
1991-92	Dave Michayluk	Muskegon Lumberjacks
1992-93	Dave Michayluk	Cleveland Lumberjacks
1993-94	Colin Chin	Fort Wayne Komets
1994-95	Jean-Marc Richard	Las Vegas Thunder
1995-96	Sergei Zholtok	Las Vegas Thunder
1996-97	Brad Werenka	Indianapolis Ice
1997-98	Mike Tomlak	Milwaukee Admirals
1999-00	Steve Maltais	Chicago Wolves
2000-01	Brian Chapman	Manitoba Moose
