= Norman R. "Bud" Poile Trophy (IHL) =

The Norman R. "Bud" Poile Trophy was awarded annually to the International Hockey League player selected as most valuable in the Turner Cup playoffs. The trophy has been awarded since the retirement of its namesake, former IHL commissioner, Bud Poile.

== Winners ==
Season	Winner	Team
1988–89	Dave Michayluk	Muskegon Lumberjacks
1989–90	Mike McNeill	Indianapolis Ice
1990–91	Michel Mongeau	Peoria Rivermen
1991–92	Ron Handy	Kansas City Blades
1992–93	Pokey Reddick	Fort Wayne Komets
1993–94	Stan Drulia	Atlanta Knights
1994–95	Kip Miller	Denver Grizzlies
1995–96	Tommy Salo	Utah Grizzlies
1996–97	Peter Ciavaglia	Detroit Vipers
1997–98	Alexander Semak	Chicago Wolves
1998–99	Mark Freer	Houston Aeros
1999–00	Andrei Trefilov	Chicago Wolves
2000–01	Norm Maracle	Orlando Solar Bears
