= Eddie Long (ice hockey) =

Canadian ice hockey player (1933–2023)

- Born: June 11, 1933; Ottawa, Ontario, Canada
- Died: July 28, 2023 (aged 90)
- Height: 5 ft 10 in (178 cm)
- Weight: 165 lb (75 kg; 11 st 11 lb)
- Position: Right wing
- Shot: Left
- Played for: Fort Wayne Komets; Louisville Rebels
- Playing career: 1952–1971

Edwin John Long (June 11, 1933 – July 28, 2023) was a Canadian professional ice hockey player who played 801 games in the International Hockey League with the Fort Wayne Komets from 1952 to 1966. He was a first team all-star in the 1961–62 and 1962–63 seasons.

== Playing career ==
In the 1957–58 season after the Komets were eliminated from the post-season by the Indianapolis Chiefs, Long made a cameo with the Louisville Rebels in the deciding game 7 of the Turner Cup Finals against the Chiefs. Allowed to play for the Rebels as a replacement for the injured Marius Groleau, Long participated and scored a goal in the Rebels' Finals defeat to the Chiefs on April 2, 1958. Long suffered the rare distinctive feat of being eliminated twice in the same post-season to the same opponent.

After the 1966 season, Long retired from professional hockey and played for four years in the Senior's Ontario league with the Kingston Aces.

In 1988, as the Fort Wayne Komets' second-highest point-getter in franchise history, Long was re-inducted into the newly established Komets Hall of Fame. He was honoured with his jersey number #16 retired.

== Death ==
Eddie Long died on July 28, 2023, at the age of 90.

== Career statistics ==
			Regular season					Playoffs
Season	Team	League	GP	G	A	Pts	PIM	GP	G	A	Pts	PIM
1952–53	Fort Wayne Komets	IHL	60	31	21	52	46	—	—	—	—	—
1953–54	Fort Wayne Komets	IHL	62	23	19	42	45	2	0	1	1	0
1954–55	Fort Wayne Komets	IHL	54	15	23	38	69	—	—	—	—	—
1955–56	Fort Wayne Komets	IHL	60	27	32	59	47	4	1	0	1	0
1956–57	Fort Wayne Komets	IHL	58	34	25	59	40	—	—	—	—	—
1957–58	Fort Wayne Komets	IHL	64	38	21	59	59	5	1	1	2	0
1957–58	Louisville Rebels	IHL	—	—	—	—	—	1	1	0	1	0
1958–59	Fort Wayne Komets	IHL	56	33	34	67	61	11	11	6	17	32
1959–60	Fort Wayne Komets	IHL	67	44	44	88	63	13	6	6	12	11
1960–61	Fort Wayne Komets	IHL	69	34	47	81	89	8	5	5	10	14
1961–62	Fort Wayne Komets	IHL	58	48	48	96	106	—	—	—	—	—
1962–63	Fort Wayne Komets	IHL	70	56	46	102	44	11	5	15	20	7
1963–64	Fort Wayne Komets	IHL	65	27	41	68	67	12	5	4	9	9
1964–65	Fort Wayne Komets	IHL	38	9	21	30	16	—	—	—	—	—
1965–66	Fort Wayne Komets	IHL	20	6	5	11	20	—	—	—	—	—
IHL totals			801	425	427	852	763	67	35	38	73	72

== Awards and honours ==
Award	Year
IHL
First All-Star Team	1962, 1963
