= Carl Wetzel =

American ice hockey player

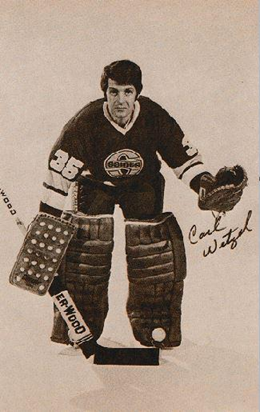
- Wetzel in 1972 photo
- Born: December 12, 1938 (age 87) Detroit, Michigan, United States
- Height: 6 ft 1 in (185 cm)
- Weight: 170 lb (77 kg; 12 st 2 lb)
- Position: Goaltender
- Caught: Left
- Played for: Detroit Red Wings; Minnesota North Stars; EC Kitzbühel; Minnesota Fighting Saints
- National team: United States
- Playing career: 1959–1973

Carl David Wetzel (born December 12, 1938) is an American retired professional ice hockey goaltender who played 7 games in the National Hockey League for the Detroit Red Wings and Minnesota North Stars between 1964 and 1968. He also played 1 game in the World Hockey Association with the Minnesota Fighting Saints during the 1972–73 season. Internationally Wetzel played for the American national team at the 1967 and 1971 World Championships.

== Playing career ==
In November 1957, as an 18-year-old, Wetzel played in relief of John Henderson for the Whitby Dunlops against the reigning Olympic gold medalist Soviet national team at Maple Leaf Gardens. This was the first time the Russians played in Canada, and Wetzel backstopped the Dunlops to a 7–2 victory. The Dunlops team featured Harry Sinden, Charlie Burns, and Sid Smith. At the time, Wetzel was the goalie for the Hamilton Tiger Cubs of the Ontario Hockey Association and played against the Dunlops before the game against the Russians. Whitby's coach, Wren Blair, took note of Wetzel's play, and upon a knee injury suffered by Whitby goaltender John Henderson, coach Blair called upon Wetzel to represent Canada against the Soviet Union. It was during the season with the Tiger Cubs that Wetzel also played in the OHA all-star game against Denis DeJordy, Chico Maki, Matt Ravlich, Pat Stapleton, and John McKenzie, all of whom later played in the NHL.

Wetzel played in the NHL during the Original Six era with the Detroit Red Wings, where he competed as the starting goalie with Roger Crozier in 1964, seeing action in two games. Wetzel was one of two Americans on an NHL roster during the season and was the only American goaltender. The other American on an NHL roster for the 1964–65 season was Tommy Williams, a right winger for the Boston Bruins. He later won the Calder Cup, the championship of the minor American Hockey League, with the Rochester Americans in 1967.

Wetzel finished his major league career in 1972–73 with the Minnesota Fighting Saints of the World Hockey Association after spending the previous season in the Austrian Hockey League with EC Kitzbühel. He would later serve as an assistant coach under Herb Brooks with the Minnesota North Stars in 1987–88.

== International play ==
Internationally, Wetzel was the starting goalie for the American national team at the 1967 World Championships in Vienna. He was voted best goaltender of the tournament, an award earned by four other Americans in the history of the IIHF (Don Rigazio, 1955; Willard Ikola, 1956; Jack McCartan, 1960; and Ty Conklin 2004). He also competed at the 1971 World Championships.

== Career statistics ==
=== Regular season and playoffs ===
			Regular season									Playoffs
Season	Team	League	GP	W	L	T	MIN	GA	SO	GAA	SV%	GP	W	L	MIN	GA	SO	GAA	SV%
1956–57	Hamilton Tiger Cubs	OHA	48	24	22	2	2880	167	3	3.48	—	4	1	3	—	240	13	0	3.25	—
1957–58	Hamilton Tiger Cubs	OHA	50	26	17	7	2980	172	1	3.46	—	15	8	6	1	900	59	0	3.93	—
1958–59	Hamilton Tiger Cubs	OHA	25	—	—	—	1500	105	0	4.26	—	—	—	—	—	—	—	—	—	—
1958–59	Edmonton Flyers	WHL	1	0	1	0	60	7	0	7.00	—	—	—	—	—	—	—	—	—	—
1959–60	Omaha Knights	IHL	62	—	—	—	3720	271	1	4.37	—	—	—	—	—	—	—	—	—	—
1960–61	Spokane Comets	WHL	5	0	5	0	302	25	0	4.97	—	—	—	—	—	—	—	—	—	—
1960–61	Indianapolis Chiefs	IHL	52	—	—	—	3120	202	0	3.88	—	—	—	—	—	—	—	—	—	—
1960–61	Fort Wayne Komets	IHL	—	—	—	—	—	—	—	—	—	8	3	3	—	480	26	0	3.25	—
1961–62	Sudbury Wolves	EPHL	61	25	26	10	3660	228	0	3.74	—	5	1	4	—	300	30	0	6.00	—
1964–65	Detroit Red Wings	NHL	2	0	1	0	33	4	0	7.46	.778	—	—	—	—	—	—	—	—	—
1964–65	Pittsburgh Hornets	AHL	4	1	3	0	241	21	0	5.23	—	—	—	—	—	—	—	—	—	—
1965–66	Houston Apollos	CHL	51	21	24	6	3040	171	4	3.38	—	—	—	—	—	—	—	—	—	—
1965–66	Quebec Aces	AHL	1	0	1	0	60	6	0	6.00	—	—	—	—	—	—	—	—	—	—
1966–67	United States National Team	Intl	12	—	—	—	720	38	0	3.17	—	—	—	—	—	—	—	—	—	—
1967–68	Minnesota North Stars	NHL	5	1	3	1	269	18	0	4.02	.869	—	—	—	—	—	—	—	—	—
1967–68	Memphis South Stars	CHL	20	8	9	2	1095	61	0	3.34	—	—	—	—	—	—	—	—	—	—
1967–68	Rochester Americans	AHL	10	3	3	1	495	28	1	3.39	—	4	2	1	—	164	6	0	2.20	—
1968–69	Cleveland Barons	AHL	2	1	0	0	80	3	1	2.25	—	—	—	—	—	—	—	—	—	—
1968–69	Memphis South Stars	AHL	39	—	—	—	2276	170	0	4.48	—	—	—	—	—	—	—	—	—	—
1969–70	United States National Team	Intl	17	—	—	—	930	30	0	1.94	—	—	—	—	—	—	—	—	—	—
1969–70	Rochester Mustangs	USHL	4	—	—	—	240	15	0	3.75	—	—	—	—	—	—	—	—	—	—
1971–72	EC Kitzbühel	AUT	44	—	—	—	2640	132	4	3.00	—	—	—	—	—	—	—	—	—	—
1972–73	Minnesota Fighting Saints	WHA	1	0	1	0	60	3	0	3.00	.914	—	—	—	—	—	—	—	—	—
WHA totals			1	0	1	0	60	3	0	3.00	.914	—	—	—	—	—	—	—	—	—
NHL totals			7	1	4	1	301	22	0	4.39	.858	—	—	—	—	—	—	—	—	—

=== International ===
Year	Team	Event	GP	W	L	T	MIN	GA	SO	GAA	SV%
1967	United States	WC	7	3	3	1	420	23	2	3.29	.931
1971	United States	WC	8	1	6	0	400	38	0	5.70	—
Senior totals			15	4	9	1	820	61	2	4.46	—
