= Len Ronson =

Canadian ice hockey player (1936–2014)

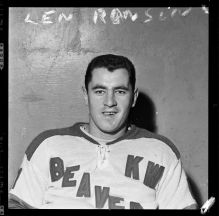
- Ronson in KW Beavers jersey. (1961)
- Born: July 8, 1936 Brantford, Ontario, Canada
- Died: September 29, 2014 (aged 78) Portland, Oregon, USA
- Height: 5 ft 9 in (175 cm)
- Weight: 175 lb (79 kg; 12 st 7 lb)
- Position: Left wing
- Shot: Left
- Played for: New York Rangers; Oakland Seals
- Playing career: 1956–1973

Leonard Keith Ronson (July 8, 1936 – September 29, 2014) was a professional ice hockey winger who played in the National Hockey League for the New York Rangers and Oakland Seals. He died in 2014, aged 78.

== Career statistics ==
=== Regular season and playoffs ===
			Regular season					Playoffs
Season	Team	League	GP	G	A	Pts	PIM	GP	G	A	Pts	PIM
1954–55	Galt Black Hawks	OHA	49	15	21	36	84	4	0	1	1	6
1955–56	St. Catharines Teepees	OHA	48	9	8	17	69	6	0	0	0	7
1956–57	Hamilton Tiger Cubs	OHA	1	0	0	0	0	—	—	—	—	—
1956–57	Chatham Maroons	OHA Sr.	18	2	2	4	26	—	—	—	—	—
1956–57	Indianapolis Chiefs/Huntington Hornets	IHL	39	7	6	13	31	4	1	0	1	0
1957–58	Fort Wayne Komets	IHL	61	26	31	57	13	4	1	2	3	2
1958–59	Fort Wayne Komets	IHL	60	39	58	97	38	11	8	6	14	4
1959–60	Fort Wayne Komets	IHL	68	62	47	109	53	13	7	10	17	2
1960–61	New York Rangers	NHL	13	2	1	3	10	—	—	—	—	—
1960–61	Buffalo Bisons	AHL	2	0	0	0	2	—	—	—	—	—
1960–61	Kitchener-Waterloo Beavers	EPHL	32	17	10	27	4	7	2	0	2	14
1961–62	Kitchener-Waterloo Beavers	EPHL	61	34	44	78	25	7	3	4	7	22
1962–63	Baltimore Clippers	AHL	45	7	15	22	20	—	—	—	—	—
1962–63	Sudbury Wolves	EPHL	16	8	17	25	6	8	3	4	7	6
1963–64	Omaha Knights	CHL	63	29	47	76	45	10	8	8	16	0
1963–64	Cleveland Barons	AHL	2	0	1	1	4	3	1	0	1	0
1964–65	Providence Reds	AHL	71	25	21	46	24	—	—	—	—	—
1965–66	Portland Buckaroos	WHL	68	18	13	31	6	14	5	2	7	6
1966–67	San Diego Gulls	WHL	71	32	35	67	22	—	—	—	—	—
1967–68	San Diego Gulls	WHL	72	45	35	80	53	7	2	5	7	4
1968–69	Oakland Seals	NHL	5	0	0	0	0	—	—	—	—	—
1968–69	San Diego Gulls	WHL	47	24	17	41	34	7	1	5	6	0
1969–70	San Diego Gulls	WHL	72	51	37	88	48	6	6	4	10	13
1970–71	San Diego Gulls	WHL	72	21	35	56	39	6	2	3	5	2
1971–72	Fort Worth Wings	CHL	4	2	3	5	0	—	—	—	—	—
1971–72	San Diego Gulls	WHL	68	21	33	54	37	4	0	0	0	0
1972–73	San Diego Gulls	WHL	44	12	18	30	14	6	3	2	5	0
WHL totals			514	224	223	447	253	50	19	21	40	25
NHL totals			18	2	1	3	10	—	—	—	—	—
