= Chuck Adamson (ice hockey) =

Canadian ice hockey player

- Born: August 20, 1938 (age 87) Sudbury, Ontario, Canada
- Height: 5 ft 10 in (178 cm)
- Weight: 156 lb (71 kg; 11 st 2 lb)
- Position: Goaltender
- Caught: Left
- Played for: IHL; Indianapolis Chiefs; Milwaukee Falcons; Fort Wayne Komets; Des Moines Oak Leafs; EHL; Jersey Larks
- Playing career: 1959–1967

Chuck Adamson (born August 20, 1938) is a Canadian former professional ice hockey goaltender.

== Career ==
Adamson played seven seasons in the International Hockey League (IHL). He started his IHL career for the Indianapolis Chiefs, playing for the Chiefs from 1959 through 1962, except for two games played for the Milwaukee Falcons in the 1950-60 season. He joined the Fort Wayne Komets for the 1962-63 IHL season after the Komets' previous goalie, Reno Zenier, refused to report. He played for the Komets through the 1964-65 IHL season but then briefly came out of retirement to play for the Komets in 1966 when their regular goalie Gerry Randall was injured.

Adamson helped the Komets to their first two Turner Cup championships in 1963 and 1965. He won the James Norris Memorial Trophy while playing with the Fort Wayne Komets during the 1964–65 IHL season. He was also a first team all-star that season, and was a second team All-Star in the 1962-63 IHL season. He set an IHL record for most saves in a game with 72 for the Indianapolis Chiefs in 1960. He set an IHL record for fewest saves in a full game for the Komets with 8 in a game against the Dayton Gems on March 27, 1965.

As of 2013, he still held the Komets' record for fewest saves in a game, as well as records for most shots faced in a season, most saves in a season, and most consecutive games played by a goalie.

The Komets retired his jersey number "1" in 2013, alongside number "33," which belonged to fellow Komets goaltender Nick Boucher.

== Awards and honors ==
Award	Year
James Norris Memorial Trophy – IHL Best Goaltender (statistical)	1964–65
