= Bobby Rivard =

Ice hockey player (1939–2023)

- Born: August 1, 1939; Sherbrooke, Quebec, Canada
- Died: January 1, 2023 (aged 83); Peterborough, Ontario, Canada
- Height: 5 ft 8 in (173 cm)
- Weight: 155 lb (70 kg; 11 st 1 lb)
- Position: Centre/Left wing
- Shot: Left
- Played for: Pittsburgh Penguins
- Playing career: 1960–1976

Robert Joseph Hervé Rivard (August 1, 1939 – January 1, 2023) was a Canadian professional ice hockey player. He played in 27 games with the Pittsburgh Penguins during the 1967–68 season. The rest of his career, which lasted from 1960 to 1976, was spent in the minor leagues.

== Career statistics ==
=== Regular season and playoffs ===
			Regular season					Playoffs
Season	Team	League	GP	G	A	Pts	PIM	GP	G	A	Pts	PIM
1958–59	Peterborough T.P.T.'s	OHA	10	3	2	5	0	19	0	2	2	0
1958–59	Peterborough T.P.T.'s	M-Cup	—	—	—	—	—	12	4	0	4	0
1959–60	Peterborough T.P.T.s	OHA	48	22	31	53	18	12	8	11	19	10
1959–60	Montreal Royals	EPHL	—	—	—	—	—	4	0	0	0	2
1960–61	Toledo Mercurys	IHL	62	20	25	45	23	—	—	—	—	—
1961–62	Indianapolis Chiefs	IHL	68	40	51	91	33	—	—	—	—	—
1962–63	Fort Wayne Komets	IHL	70	20	36	56	25	11	8	2	10	6
1963–64	Fort Wayne Komets	IHL	70	34	62	96	38	12	3	11	14	4
1964–65	Fort Wayne Komets	IHL	70	46	70	116	44	10	7	8	15	2
1965–66	Fort Wayne Komets	IHL	70	42	91	133	32	6	4	5	9	2
1966–67	Quebec Aces	AHL	71	22	40	62	22	5	3	2	5	0
1967–68	Pittsburgh Penguins	NHL	27	5	12	17	4	—	—	—	—	—
1967–68	Baltimore Clippers	AHL	41	14	24	38	12	—	—	—	—	—
1968–69	Quebec Aces	AHL	32	3	17	20	20	4	0	3	3	2
1968–69	Baltimore Clippers	AHL	39	17	21	38	22	—	—	—	—	—
1969–70	Baltimore Clippers	AHL	68	21	35	56	16	5	2	3	5	0
1970–71	Baltimore Clippers	AHL	68	26	16	42	16	6	1	2	3	6
1971–72	Baltimore Clippers	AHL	75	23	35	58	18	18	10	15	25	8
1972–73	Baltimore Clippers	AHL	76	25	50	75	28	—	—	—	—	—
1973–74	Baltimore Clippers	AHL	76	36	56	92	48	9	4	5	9	0
1974–75	Baltimore Clippers	AHL	46	14	23	37	26	—	—	—	—	—
1974–75	Fort Wayne Komets	IHL	24	7	14	21	16	—	—	—	—	—
1975–76	Lindsay Lancers	OHA Sr	30	12	17	29	14	—	—	—	—	—
AHL totals			592	201	317	518	228	47	20	30	50	16
IHL totals			434	209	349	558	211	39	22	26	48	14
NHL totals			27	5	12	17	4	—	—	—	—	—
