= Ted Lanyon =

Canadian ice hockey player

- Born: June 11, 1939 Winnipeg, Manitoba, Canada
- Died: May 21, 2008 (aged 68) Winnipeg, Manitoba, Canada
- Height: 5 ft 11 in (180 cm)
- Weight: 175 lb (79 kg; 12 st 7 lb)
- Position: Defence
- Shot: Right
- Played for: Pittsburgh Penguins
- NHL draft: Undrafted
- Playing career: 1959–1973

Edward George Lanyon (June 11, 1939 – May 21, 2008) was a Canadian professional ice hockey player who played five games in the National Hockey League for the Pittsburgh Penguins during the 1967–68 season. The rest of his career, which lasted from 1959 to 1973, was spent in various minor leagues. He died in 2008.

== Career statistics ==
=== Regular season and playoffs ===
			Regular season					Playoffs
Season	Team	League	GP	G	A	Pts	PIM	GP	G	A	Pts	PIM
1957–58	St. Boniface Canadiens	MJHL	28	7	14	21	92	12	2	5	7	27
1957–58	St. Boniface Canadiens	M-Cup	—	—	—	—	—	11	3	2	5	35
1958–59	St. Boniface Canadiens	MJHL	28	8	12	20	67	9	0	1	1	18
1959–60	St. Paul Saints	IHL	34	4	9	13	50	—	—	—	—	—
1959–60	Johnstown Jets	EHL	14	4	3	7	25	13	0	0	0	12
1960–61	Milwaukee Falcons	IHL	15	7	2	9	28	—	—	—	—	—
1961–62	Minneapolis Millers	IHL	49	6	12	18	88	—	—	—	—	—
1962–63	Greensboro Generals	EHL	68	15	25	40	104	—	—	—	—	—
1963–64	Greensboro Generals	EHL	44	8	14	22	96	—	—	—	—	—
1963–64	Cleveland Barons	AHL	1	0	0	0	2	—	—	—	—	—
1964–65	Cleveland Barons	AHL	9	13	22	37	—	—	—	—	—
1964–65	Omaha Knights	CPHL	2	0	0	0	0	—	—	—	—	—
1965–66	Cleveland Barons	AHL	64	5	10	15	55	—	—	—	—	—
1966–67	Buffalo Bisons	AHL	69	9	13	22	110	—	—	—	—	—
1967–68	Baltimore Clippers	AHL	34	1	9	10	22	—	—	—	—	—
1967–68	Pittsburgh Penguins	NHL	5	0	0	0	4	—	—	—	—	—
1968–69	Amarillo Wranglers	CHL	58	6	26	32	168	—	—	—	—	—
1969–70	Baltimore Clippers	AHL	9	1	1	2	13	—	—	—	—	—
1969–70	Greensboro Generals	EHL	47	13	33	46	80	16	5	13	18	18
1970–71	Greensboro Generals	EHL	70	20	40	60	128	9	0	5	5	2
1970–71	Omaha Knights	CHL	—	—	—	—	—	6	1	0	1	2
1971–72	Greensboro Generals	EHL	35	8	27	35	39	8	2	2	4	27
1972–73	Greensboro Generals	EHL	54	7	30	37	69	12	3	6	9	0
AHL totals			247	25	46	71	239	12	0	5	5	4
EHL totals			332	75	172	247	541	65	12	27	99	77
NHL totals			5	0	0	0	4	—	—	—	—	—
