= 1957–58 IHL season =

North American ice hockey season

The 1957–58 IHL season was the 13th season of the International Hockey League, a North American minor professional league. Outside of the Louisville Rebels, who relocated from Huntington, the league's teams all remained intact from the previous season.

The season saw the dominant Cincinnati Mohawks win their sixth-straight regular season title only to be upset in the Turner Cup semifinals by Louisville. The playoff loss denied the Mohawks their sixth-straight Turner Cup championship. Meanwhile, in the Turner Cup Finals, the Indianapolis Chiefs defeated the Louisville Rebels 4-games-to-3 in a tight series. Both teams had less wins in the regular season then losses.

== Regular season ==
	GP	W	L	T	GF	GA	Pts
Cincinnati Mohawks	64	43	16	5	303	176	91
Fort Wayne Komets	64	28	28	8	213	224	64
Louisville Rebels	64	30	31	3	239	263	63
Indianapolis Chiefs	64	28	30	6	209	208	62
Toledo Mercurys	64	26	32	6	214	248	58
Troy Bruins	64	20	38	6	192	251	46

== Turner Cup-Playoffs ==
Turner-Cup-Semifinals
1	Cincinnati Mohawks	1
3	Louisville Rebels	3
2	Fort Wayne Komets	1
4	Indianapolis Chiefs	3

Turner-Cup-Final
3	Louisville Rebels	3
4	Indianapolis Chiefs	4

== Turner Cup playoffs ==
=== Semifinals ===
Louisville Rebels 3, Cincinnati Mohawks 1

Game	Date	Visitor	Score	Home	Series	Arena	Attendance
1	March 16	Louisville Rebels	5-1	Cincinnati Mohawks	1–0	Cincinnati Gardens	1,150
2	March 17	Cincinnati Mohawks	5-1	Louisville Rebels	1-1	Louisville Gardens	1,680
3	March 19	Louisville Rebels	2-1 OT	Cincinnati Mohawks	2–1	Cincinnati Gardens	N/A
4	March 20	Cincinnati Mohawks	1-6	Louisville Rebels	3–1	Louisville Gardens	2,003

Indianapolis Chiefs 3, Fort Wayne Komets 1

Game	Date	Visitor	Score	Home	Series	Arena	Attendance
1	March 16	Indianapolis Chiefs	3-1	Fort Wayne Komets	1–0	Allen County War Memorial Coliseum	2,768
2	March 18	Indianapolis Chiefs	4-5 OT	Fort Wayne Komets	1-1	Allen County War Memorial Coliseum	N/A
3	March 19	Fort Wayne Komets	2-8	Indianapolis Chiefs	2-1	Indiana State Fair Coliseum	N/A
4	March 21	Fort Wayne Komets	0-3	Indianapolis Chiefs	2-2	Indiana State Fair Coliseum	N/A

=== Turner Cup Finals ===
Indianapolis Chiefs 4, Louisville Rebels 3

Game	Date	Visitor	Score	Home	Series	Arena	Attendance
1	March 23	Louisville Rebels	5-4 OT	Indianapolis Chiefs	1–0	Indiana State Fair Coliseum	N/A
2	March 24	Louisville Rebels	3-6	Indianapolis Chiefs	1-1	Indiana State Fair Coliseum	N/A
3	March 26	Indianapolis Chiefs	3-1	Louisville Rebels	2-1	Louisville Gardens	N/A
4	March 28	Indianapolis Chiefs	3-6	Louisville Rebels	2-2	Louisville Gardens	N/A
5	March 30	Indianapolis Chiefs	0-1	Louisville Rebels	3-2	Louisville Gardens	N/A
6	March 31	Indianapolis Chiefs	3-2 OT	Louisville Rebels	3-3	Louisville Gardens	N/A
7	April 1	Indianapolis Chiefs	3-2	Louisville Rebels	4-3	Louisville Gardens	N/A

== Awards ==
Award Name	Accomplishment	Player	Team
James Gatschene Memorial Trophy	Most Valuable Player	Pierre Brillant	Indianapolis Chiefs
George H. Wilkinson Trophy	Top Scorer	Warren Hynes	Cincinnati Mohawks
James Norris Memorial Trophy	Fewest Goals Against	Glenn Ramsay	Cincinnati Mohawks

== Coaches ==
- Cincinnati Mohawks: Billy Goold
- Fort Wayne Komets: Eddie Olson
- Indianapolis Chiefs: Leo Lamoureux
- Louisville Rebels: Leo Gasparini
- Toledo Mercurys: Doug Balwin
- Troy Bruins: Jim Hay
