= Hillary Menard =

Canadian ice hockey player (1934–2026)

- Born: January 15, 1934 Timmins, Ontario, Canada
- Died: November 7, 2026 (aged 92)
- Height: 5 ft 8 in (173 cm)
- Weight: 165 lb (75 kg; 11 st 11 lb)
- Position: Left wing
- Shot: Left
- Played for: Chicago Black Hawks
- Playing career: 1954–1968

Hillary Gilbert "Minnie" Menard (January 15, 1934 – November 7, 2026) was a Canadian professional ice hockey left winger who played in one National Hockey League game for the Chicago Black Hawks during the 1953–54 season. The rest of his career, which lasted from 1954 to 1968, was spent in various minor leagues. Hillary is the brother of Howie Menard.

== Playing career ==
Leaving home at the age of fifteen, Minnie crafted one of the great stories in Canadian and USA hockey's Golden Age. At 5' 10" and weighing 178 lbs, his professional hockey career spanned fourteen years across six different leagues. Minnie's playing career ended in 1968.

== Death ==
Menard died on November 7, 2026, at the age of 92.

== Career statistics ==
=== Regular season and playoffs ===
			Regular season					Playoffs
Season	Team	League	GP	G	A	Pts	PIM	GP	G	A	Pts	PIM
1951–52	Barrie Flyers	OHA	42	20	16	36	54	—	—	—	—	—
1952–53	Galt Black Hawks	OHA	55	23	19	42	143	10	11	7	18	9
1953–54	Galt Black Hawks	OHA	19	6	15	21	30	—	—	—	—	—
1953–54	Hamilton Tiger Cubs	OHA	4	0	0	0	0	—	—	—	—	—
1953–54	Guelph Biltmores	OHA	34	17	23	40	42	3	3	0	3	21
1953–54	Chicago Black Hawks	NHL	1	0	0	0	0	—	—	—	—	—
1954–55	Pembroke Lumber Kings	NOHA	15	1	3	4	10	—	—	—	—	—
1955–56	Val-d'Or Miners	NOSHA	—	—	—	—	—	—	—	—	—	—
1956–57	Belleville McFarlands	OHA Sr	51	50	28	78	134	10	5	4	9	10
1957–58	Belleville McFarlands	OHA Sr	51	22	24	46	46	13	7	4	11	18
1957–58	Belleville McFarlands	Al-Cup	—	—	—	—	—	14	9	4	13	20
1958–59	Belleville McFarlands	OHA Sr	48	12	22	34	55	—	—	—	—	—
1959–60	New York Rovers	EHL	48	22	14	36	53	—	—	—	—	—
1960–61	New York Rovers	EHL	2	0	0	0	0	—	—	—	—	—
1960–61	Omaha Knights	IHL	55	18	30	48	88	—	—	—	—	—
1961–62	Omaha Knights	IHL	64	20	41	61	76	7	0	1	1	6
1962–63	Des Moines Oak Leafs	USHL	32	25	36	61	50	—	—	—	—	—
1962–63	Omaha Knights	IHL	7	4	2	6	16	7	6	2	8	8
1963–64	Des Moines Oak Leafs	IHL	39	11	22	33	49	—	—	—	—	—
1964–65	Des Moines Oak Leafs	IHL	1	0	0	0	0	—	—	—	—	—
1965–66	Des Moines Oak Leafs	IHL	3	1	0	1	2	—	—	—	—	—
1966–67	Belleville Mohawks	OHA Sr	40	13	26	39	18	—	—	—	—	—
1967–68	Belleville Mohawks	OHA Sr	34	22	11	33	23	—	—	—	—	—
IHL totals			169	54	95	149	231	14	6	3	9	14
NHL totals			1	0	0	0	0	—	—	—	—	—

== See also ==
- List of players who played only one game in the NHL
