= 1956–57 IHL season =

North American ice hockey season

The 1956–57 IHL season was the 12th season of the International Hockey League (IHL), a North American minor professional ice hockey league. Six teams participated in the regular season, and the Cincinnati Mohawks won the Turner Cup.

== Regular season ==
	GP	W	L	T	GF	GA	Pts
Cincinnati Mohawks	60	50	9	1	245	113	101
Indianapolis Chiefs	60	26	29	5	168	177	57
Toledo Mercurys	60	26	30	4	166	186	56
Huntington Hornets	60	26	30	4	180	188	56
Fort Wayne Komets	60	25	29	6	170	177	56
Troy Bruins	60	15	41	4	135	223	34

== Turner Cup-Playoffs ==
Turner Cup-Semifinals
1	Cincinnati Mohawks	3
4	Huntington Hornets	1
2	Indianapolis Chiefs	3
3	Toledo Mercurys	2

Turner Cup-Final
1	Cincinnati Mohawks	3
2	Indianapolis Chiefs	0

== Turner Cup playoffs ==
=== Semifinals ===
Cincinnati Mohawks 3, Huntington Hornets 1

Game	Date	Visitor	Score	Home	Series	Arena	Attendance
1	March 12	Huntington Hornets	4–5	Cincinnati Mohawks	1–0	Cincinnati Gardens	705
2	March 15	Cincinnati Mohawks	1–6	Huntington Hornets	1–1	Veterans Memorial Fieldhouse	2,467
3	March 17	Huntington Hornets	2–4	Cincinnati Mohawks	2–1	Cincinnati Gardens	1,535
4	March 19	Cincinnati Mohawks	6–1	Huntington Hornets	3–1	Veterans Memorial Fieldhouse	N/A

Toledo Mercurys 3, Indianapolis Chiefs 2

Game	Date	Visitor	Score	Home	Series	Arena	Attendance
1	March 13	Toledo Mercurys	3–1	Indianapolis Chiefs	1–0	Indiana State Fair Coliseum	1,420
2	March 16	Indianapolis Chiefs	2–1	Toledo Mercurys	1–1	Toledo Sports Arena	NA
3	March 17	Toledo Mercurys	1–2	Indianapolis Chiefs	2–1	Indiana State Fair Coliseum	NA
4	March 19	Indianapolis Chiefs	2–3	Toledo Mercurys	2–2	Toledo Sports Arena	1,878
5	March 20	Toledo Mercurys	3–2	Indianapolis Chiefs	3–2	Indiana State Fair Coliseum	NA

=== Turner Cup Finals ===
Cincinnati Mohawks 3, Indianapolis Chiefs 0

Game	Date	Visitor	Score	Home	Series	Arena	Attendance
1	March 23	Indianapolis Chiefs	1–4	Cincinnati Mohawks	1–0	Cincinnati Gardens	1,655
2	March 24	Cincinnati Mohawks	7–1	Indianapolis Chiefs	2–0	Indiana State Fair Coliseum	1,895
3	March 26	Cincinnati Mohawks	5–0	Indianapolis Chiefs	3–0	Indiana State Fair Coliseum	1,255

== Awards ==
Award Name	Accomplishment	Player	Team
James Gatschene Memorial Trophy	Most Valuable Player	Pierre Brillant	Indianapolis Chiefs
George H. Wilkinson Trophy	Top Scorer	Pierre Brillant	Indianapolis Chiefs
James Norris Memorial Trophy	Fewest Goals Against	Glenn Ramsay	Cincinnati Mohawks

== Coaches ==
- Cincinnati Mohawks: Rollie McLenahan
- Fort Wayne Komets: Doug McCaig
- Huntington Hornets: Eddie Olson
- Indianapolis Chiefs Leo Lamoureux
- Toledo Mercurys: Butch Stahan
- Troy Bruins: Nels Podolsky
