= Gerry Glaude =

Canadian ice hockey player

- Born: November 10, 1927 Valleyfield, Quebec, Canada
- Died: January 9, 2017 (aged 89)
- Height: 6 ft 2 in (188 cm)
- Weight: 225 lb (102 kg; 16 st 1 lb)
- Position: Defence
- Shot: Left
- Played for: EHL; New York Rovers; AHL; New Haven Ramblers; Quebec Aces; QHL; Valleyfield Braves; Chicoutimi Sagueneens; IHL; Muskegon Zephyrs
- NHL draft: Undrafted
- Playing career: 1946–1963

Gerry Glaude (November 10, 1927 – January 9, 2017) was a Canadian professional ice hockey defenceman.

As a member of the Muskegon Zephyrs, Glaude was named to the IHL First All-Star Team in three consecutive years (1961 to 1963). During the 1962–63 IHL season, Glaude became the first defenceman in the history of professional hockey to score 100 points in a single season.

== Awards and honours ==
Award	Year
IHL First All-Star Team	1960–61
IHL First All-Star Team	1961–62
IHL First All-Star Team	1962–63
