= George Ranieri =

Canadian ice hockey player

- Born: January 14, 1936 (age 89); Toronto, Ontario, Canada
- Height: 5 ft 8 in (173 cm)
- Weight: 190 lb (86 kg; 13 st 8 lb)
- Position: Left wing
- Shot: Left
- Played for: Boston Bruins
- Playing career: 1955–1965

George Dominic Ranieri (born January 14, 1936) is a Canadian former ice hockey player who played two games in the National Hockey League with the Boston Bruins during the 1956–57 season. The rest of his playing career, which lasted from 1955 to 1965, was spent in the minor leagues.

== Career statistics ==
=== Regular season and playoffs ===
			Regular season					Playoffs
Season	Team	League	GP	G	A	Pts	PIM	GP	G	A	Pts	PIM
1953–54	Hamilton Tiger Cubs	OHA	6	0	1	1	4	—	—	—	—	—
1953–54	Barrie Flyers	OHA	48	20	18	38	92	—	—	—	—	—
1954–55	Barrie Flyers	OHA	49	14	28	42	101	—	—	—	—	—
1954–55	Edmonton Flyers	WHL	2	0	0	0	0	—	—	—	—	—
1955–56	Barrie Flyers	OHA	48	29	28	57	74	18	6	14	20	28
1955–56	Edmonton Flyers	WHL	2	0	1	1	0	—	—	—	—	—
1956–57	Boston Bruins	NHL	2	0	0	0	0	—	—	—	—	—
1956–57	Vancouver Canucks	WHL	50	7	12	19	64	—	—	—	—	—
1956–57	Hershey Bears	AHL	4	1	0	1	0	—	—	—	—	—
1957–58	Quebec Aces	QHL	5	0	1	1	4	—	—	—	—	—
1957–58	Hershey Bears	AHL	8	0	2	2	4	—	—	—	—	—
1957–58	Louisville Rebels	IHL	52	25	19	44	54	11	3	8	11	22
1958–59	Louisville Rebels	IHL	59	60	64	124	64	11	11	13	24	6
1959–60	Louisville Rebels	IHL	8	8	4	12	18	—	—	—	—	—
1959–60	New York Rovers	EHL	64	35	45	80	45	—	—	—	—	—
1960–61	Providence Reds	AHL	72	30	41	71	30	—	—	—	—	—
1961–62	Providence Reds	AHL	49	21	22	43	38	—	—	—	—	—
1962–63	Providence Reds	AHL	58	21	23	44	52	6	1	1	2	2
1963–64	Providence Reds	AHL	54	20	26	46	38	—	—	—	—	—
1964–65	Providence Reds	AHL	61	18	22	40	38	—	—	—	—	—
AHL totals			306	111	136	247	200	6	1	1	2	2
NHL totals			2	0	0	0	0	—	—	—	—	—
