= Leo P. Lamoureux Memorial Trophy =

The Leo P. Lamoureux Memorial Trophy was awarded annually to the International Hockey League's leading point scorer. The trophy was donated by Melvin T. Ross, the manager of the Indiana State Fair Coliseum, in memoriam of Leo Lamoureux, coach of the Indianapolis Chiefs, who died during the 1960–1961 season.

Prior to 1961, the top scorer award was known as the George H. Wilkinson Trophy, named after Lt.-Col., George H. Wilkinson, V.D., a Windsor, Ontario, jeweler and one of the league's original sponsors.

== Winners ==
George H. Wilkinson Trophy
| Season | Player | Team |
|---|---|---|
| 1946-47 | Harry Marchand | Windsor Spitfires |
| 1947-48 | Dick Kowcinak | Detroit Auto Club |
| 1948-49 | Leo Richard | Toledo Mercurys |
| 1949-50 | Dick Kowcinak | Sarnia Sailors |
| 1950-51 | Herve Parent | Grand Rapids Rockets |
| 1951-52 | George Parker | Grand Rapids Rockets |
| 1952-53 | Alex Irving | Milwaukee Chiefs |
| 1953-54 | Don Hall | Johnstown Jets |
| 1954-55 | Phil Goyette | Cincinnati Mohawks |
| 1955-56 | Max Mekilok | Cincinnati Mohawks |
| 1956-57 | Pierre Brillant | Indianapolis Chiefs |
| 1957-58 | Warren Haynes | Cincinnati Mohawks |
| 1958-59 | George Ranieri | Louisville Rebels |
| 1959-60 | William "Chick" Chalmers | Louisville Rebels |
Leo P. Lamoureux Memorial Trophy
| Season | Player | Team |
| 1960-61 | Ken Yackel | Minneapolis Millers |
| 1961-62 | Len Thornson | Fort Wayne Komets |
| 1962-63 | Ed "Moe" Bartoli | Minneapolis Millers |
| 1963-64 | Len Thornson | Fort Wayne Komets |
| 1964-65 | Lloyd Maxfield | Port Huron Flags |
| 1965-66 | Bobby Rivard | Fort Wayne Komets |
| 1966-67 | Len Thornson | Fort Wayne Komets |
| 1967-68 | Gary Ford | Muskegon Mohawks |
| 1968-69 | Don Westbrooke | Dayton Gems |
| 1969-70 | Don Westbrooke | Dayton Gems |
| 1970-71 | Darrel Knibbs | Muskegon Mohawks |
| 1971-72 | Gary Ford | Muskegon Mohawks |
| 1972-73 | Gary Ford | Muskegon Mohawks |
| 1973-74 | Peter Mara | Des Moines Capitols |
| 1974-75 | Rick Bragnalo | Dayton Gems |
| 1975-76 | Len Fontaine | Port Huron Flags |
| 1976-77 | Jim Koleff | Flint Generals |
| 1977-78 | Jim Johnston | Flint Generals |
| 1978-79 | Terry McDougall | Fort Wayne Komets |
| 1979-80 | Al Dumba | Fort Wayne Komets |
| 1980-81 | Marcel Comeau | Saginaw Gears |
| 1981-82 | Brent Jarrett | Kalamazoo Wings |
| 1982-83 | Dale Yakiwchuk | Milwaukee Admirals |
| 1983-84 | Wally Schreiber | Fort Wayne Komets |
| 1984-85 | Scott MacLeod | Salt Lake Golden Eagles |
| 1985-86 | Scott MacLeod | Salt Lake Golden Eagles |
| 1986-87 | Jock Callander | Muskegon Lumberjacks |
| 1986-87 | Jeff Pyle | Saginaw Generals |
| 1987-88 | John Cullen | Flint Spirits |
| 1988-89 | Dave Michayluk | Muskegon Lumberjacks |
| 1989-90 | Michel Mongeau | Peoria Rivermen |
| 1990-91 | Lonnie Loach | Fort Wayne Komets |
| 1991-92 | Dmitri Kvartalnov | San Diego Gulls |
| 1992-93 | Tony Hrkac | Indianapolis Ice |
| 1993-94 | Rob Brown | Kalamazoo Wings |
| 1994-95 | Stephane Morin | Minnesota Moose |
| 1995-96 | Rob Brown | Chicago Wolves |
| 1996-97 | Rob Brown | Chicago Wolves |
| 1997-98 | Patrice Lefebvre | Las Vagas Thunder |
| 1998-99 | Brian Wiseman | Houston Aeros |
| 1999-00 | Steve Maltais | Chicago Wolves |
| 2000-01 | Derek King | Grand Rapids Griffins |
| 2000-01 | Steve Larouche | Chicago Wolves |
