= Pete Horeck =

Canadian ice hockey player

- Born: June 15, 1923 Massey, Ontario, Canada
- Died: August 29, 2009 (aged 86) Sudbury, Ontario, Canada
- Height: 5 ft 9 in (175 cm)
- Weight: 158 lb (72 kg; 11 st 4 lb)
- Position: Left wing
- Shot: Left
- Played for: Chicago Black Hawks; Detroit Red Wings; Boston Bruins
- Playing career: 1941–1960

Peter "Pistol Pete" Horeck (June 15, 1923 — August 29, 2009) was a Canadian professional ice hockey player who played in the National Hockey League for the Chicago Black Hawks, Detroit Red Wings, and Boston Bruins between 1944 and 1952.

== Early life ==
Horeck was born and raised in Massey, Ontario, a small town located about 100 km southwest of Sudbury, Ontario. He was one of eight boys in his family. He took up the sport of hockey in the town.

== Career ==
=== Pre NHL ===
Horeck left his hometown to play for the Parry Sound Pilots along with Doug Orr, the father of Bobby Orr. After his tenure in Parry Sound, He played one year in the Eastern Hockey League and four years in the American Hockey League.

=== NHL ===
Horeck started his National Hockey League career with the Chicago Black Hawks in 1944. In his second season, he recorded a career high 20 goals and 21 assists for 41 points in all 50 games to make him one of the league's top scorers that year.

Horeck was traded midway through the 1946–47 season to the Detroit Red Wings, where he would spend another three years. He recorded 3 goals and 7 assists for 10 points in 10 games during the 1947–48 playoffs where Detroit would lose to the Toronto Maple Leafs in the final.

Horeck joined the Boston Bruins before the 1950–51 season. With his production starting to decline, He left the NHL after the 1951–52 season.

=== Post NHL ===
Horeck moved back up north to the Northern Ontario Hockey Association where he would play for five years for the Sudbury Wolves and the Soo Indians. He would then spend the rest of his career in various minor leagues until he retired from hockey in 1960.

== Later life ==
After his retirement, Horeck would settle in Northern Ontario for the rest of his life until his death after a long battle with prostate cancer and neuropathy on Saturday, August 29, 2009, in Sudbury, Ontario. He is considered a hero in his hometown of Massey.

== Career statistics ==
=== Regular season and playoffs ===
			Regular season					Playoffs
Season	Team	League	GP	G	A	Pts	PIM	GP	G	A	Pts	PIM
1940–41	Parry Sound Pilots	OHA B	—	—	—	—	—	—	—	—	—	—
1941–42	Atlantic City Sea Gulls	EAHL	59	24	30	54	66	14	2	5	7	6
1942–43	Washington Lions	AHL	1	1	1	2	2	—	—	—	—	—
1942–43	Providence Reds	AHL	16	8	8	16	18	—	—	—	—	—
1942–43	Cleveland Barons	AHL	43	16	11	27	38	4	1	1	2	2
1943–44	Cleveland Barons	AHL	54	34	29	63	29	11	4	5	9	14
1944–45	Chicago Black Hawks	NHL	50	20	16	36	44	—	—	—	—	—
1945–46	Chicago Black Hawks	NHL	50	20	21	41	34	4	0	0	0	2
1946–47	Chicago Black Hawks	NHL	18	4	6	10	12	—	—	—	—	—
1946–47	Detroit Red Wings	NHL	38	12	13	25	59	5	2	0	2	6
1947–48	Detroit Red Wings	NHL	50	12	17	29	44	10	3	7	10	12
1948–49	Detroit Red Wings	NHL	60	14	16	30	46	11	1	1	2	10
1949–50	Boston Bruins	NHL	34	5	5	10	22	—	—	—	—	—
1950–51	Boston Bruins	NHL	66	10	13	23	57	4	0	0	0	13
1951–52	Chicago Black Hawks	NHL	60	9	11	20	22	—	—	—	—	—
1952–53	Sault Ste. Marie Indians	NOHA	19	4	8	12	18	3	0	1	1	7
1953–54	Sudbury Wolves	NOHA	12	3	5	8	25	11	2	4	6	18
1954–55	Sudbury Wolves	NOHA	38	18	18	36	42	—	—	—	—	—
1955–56	Sault Ste. Marie Indians	NOHA	36	12	24	36	30	7	2	1	3	22
1956–57	Sault Ste. Marie Indians	NOHA	47	22	20	42	91	10	3	2	5	18
1957–58	Louisville Rebels	IHL	15	6	7	13	69	—	—	—	—	—
1957–58	Chatham Maroons	OHA Sr	15	7	4	11	34	—	—	—	—	—
1959–60	Charlotte Clippers	EHL	15	1	1	2	22	—	—	—	—	—
NHL totals			426	106	118	224	340	34	6	8	14	43
