= List of Fort Wayne Komets seasons =

This is a list of seasons completed by Fort Wayne Komets in the teams' history across multiple franchises in the original International Hockey League (1952–99), United/International Hockey League (1999–2010), Central Hockey League (2010–12), and the ECHL (2012–present).

Season	League	GP	W	L	T	OTL	SOL	Pts	GF	GA	PIM	Playoffs
1952–53	IHL	60	20	38	2	0	—	42	182	244	—	Did not qualify
1953–54	IHL	64	29	30	5	—	—	63	203	220	—	Lost in Quarterfinals
1954–55	IHL	60	22	37	1	—	—	45	181	235	—	Did not qualify
1955–56	IHL	60	29	29	2	—	—	60	272	219	—	Lost in Semifinals
1956–57	IHL	60	25	29	8	—	—	64	170	177	—	Did not qualify
1957–58	IHL	64	28	28	8	—	—	64	213	224	726	Lost in Semifinals
1958–59	IHL	60	32	27	1	—	—	65	236	213	571	Lost in Finals
1959–60	IHL	68	50	16	2	—	—	102	312	187	1102	Lost in Finals
1960–61	IHL	69	31	35	3	—	—	65	304	265	899	Lost in Round Robin
1961–62	IHL	68	33	31	4	—	—	70	265	245	1054	Did not qualify
1962–63	IHL	70	35	30	5	—	—	75	283	255	591	Won Championship
1963–64	IHL	70	41	28	1	—	—	83	322	264	935	Lost in Finals
1964–65	IHL	70	40	25	5	—	—	85	344	240	969	Won Championship
1965–66	IHL	70	38	26	6	—	—	82	312	259	—	Lost in Semifinals
1966–67	IHL	72	40	31	1	—	—	81	274	234	—	Lost in Finals
1967–68	IHL	72	30	29	13	—	—	73	282	272	—	Lost in Semifinals
1968–69	IHL	72	24	33	15	—	—	63	235	262	—	Lost in Semifinals
1969–70	IHL	72	26	38	8	—	—	60	241	266	—	Lost in Quarterfinals
1970–71	IHL	72	28	32	12	—	—	68	221	233	—	Lost in Quarterfinals
1971–72	IHL	72	37	33	2	—	—	76	291	244	—	Lost in Semifinals
1972–73	IHL	74	48	23	3	—	—	99	308	219	—	Won Championship
1973–74	IHL	76	31	45	0	—	—	62	245	305	—	Did not qualify
1974–75	IHL	76	26	44	6	—	—	58	247	313	—	Did not qualify
1975–76	IHL	78	28	36	14	—	—	70	289	309	—	Lost in Semifinals
1976–77	IHL	78	32	36	10	—	—	74	301	311	—	Lost in Semifinals
1977–78	IHL	80	40	23	17	—	—	97	305	287	—	Lost in Semifinals
1978–79	IHL	80	45	29	6	—	—	96	386	327	—	Lost in Semifinals
1979–80	IHL	80	40	27	13	—	—	93	343	311	—	Lost in Finals
1980–81	IHL	82	37	30	15	—	—	89	337	303	—	Lost in Semifinals
1981–82	IHL	82	35	41	6	—	—	81	368	375	—	Lost in Semifinals
1982–83	IHL	82	45	26	11	—	—	103	377	344	—	Lost in Semifinals
1983–84	IHL	82	52	23	7	—	—	112	371	273	—	Lost in Semifinals
1984–85	IHL	82	37	34	11	—	—	90	339	327	—	Lost in Semifinals
1985–86	IHL	82	52	22	—	8	—	112	345	263	—	Lost in Finals
1986–87	IHL	82	48	26	—	8	—	104	343	285	—	Lost in Semifinals
1987–88	IHL	82	48	30	—	4	—	100	343	310	—	Lost in Quarterfinals
1988–89	IHL	82	46	30	—	6	—	98	293	274	—	Lost in Semifinals
1989–90	IHL	82	37	34	—	11	—	85	316	345	—	Lost in Quarterfinals
1990–91	IHL	83	43	35	—	5	—	91	369	335	—	Lost in Finals
1991–92	IHL	82	52	22	—	3	5	112	340	287	—	Lost in Quarterfinals
1992–93	IHL	82	49	27	—	2	4	104	339	294	2165	Won Championship
1993–94	IHL	81	41	29	—	11	0	93	347	297	1792	Lost in Finals
1994–95	IHL	81	34	39	—	8	0	76	296	324	1541	Lost in Quarterfinals
1995–96	IHL	82	39	35	—	8	0	86	276	296	2267	Lost in Quarterfinals
1996–97	IHL	82	28	47	—	7	0	63	223	318	2412	Did not qualify
1997–98	IHL	82	47	29	—	6	0	100	270	243	1675	Lost in Quarterfinals
1998–99	IHL	82	33	33	—	16	0	82	250	280	2615	Lost in Quarterfinals
1999–00	UHL	74	40	27	—	7	0	87	281	251	1504	Lost in Semifinals
2000–01	UHL	74	42	26	—	6	0	90	261	253	1566	Lost in Semifinals
2001–02	UHL	74	37	24	—	13	0	87	227	215	1432	Did not qualify
2002–03	UHL	76	44	21	—	11	0	99	249	191	1717	Won Championship
2003–04	UHL	76	53	17	—	6	0	112	281	180	1687	Lost in Semifinals
2004–05	UHL	80	51	24	—	5	0	107	274	211	1708	Lost in Finals
2005–06	UHL	76	44	26	—	0	6	94	258	206	1760	Lost in Quarterfinals
2006–07	UHL	76	51	21	—	0	4	106	263	187	1932	Lost in Semifinals
2007–08	IHL	76	56	12	—	6	2	120	280	186	1978	Won Championship
2008–09	IHL	76	46	18	—	3	9	104	288	213	1678	Won Championship
2009–10	IHL	76	50	21	—	1	4	105	263	183	1589	Won Championship
2010–11	CHL	66	31	27	—	5	3	70	187	204	1352	Lost in Quarterfinals
2011–12	CHL	66	40	19	—	1	6	83	228	187	1272	Won Championship
2012–13	ECHL	72	33	35	—	1	3	70	205	246	1385	Did not qualify
2013–14	ECHL	72	36	24	—	7	5	84	215	215	954	Lost in Conference Semifinals
2014–15	ECHL	72	48	18	—	2	4	102	251	200	1033	Lost in Conference Semifinals
2015–16	ECHL	72	40	23	—	7	2	89	240	200	1196	Lost in Conference Finals
2016–17	ECHL	72	45	19	—	6	2	98	264	210	1292	Lost in Division Finals
2017–18	ECHL	72	46	20	—	5	1	98	290	216	1078	Lost in Conference Finals
2018–19	ECHL	76	36	26	—	4	6	82	233	248	1132	Lost in Division Semifinals
2019–20	ECHL	62	31	23	—	6	2	70	218	220	1044	Season cancelled due to COVID-19 pandemic
2020–21	ECHL	51	29	17	—	3	2	63	170	136	925	Won Championship
2021–22	ECHL	72	40	25	—	6	1	87	267	225	1271	Lost in Division Semifinals
2022–23	ECHL	72	34	31	—	4	3	75	267	273	1450	Lost in Division Semifinals
2023–24	ECHL	72	35	30	—	3	4	77	224	226	996	Did not qualify
2024–25	ECHL	72	41	22	—	7	2	91	229	193	885	Lost in Division Finals
2025–26	ECHL	72	45	17	—	10	0	100	250	189	846	Lost in Conference Finals

Records as of the conclusion of the 2025–26 regular season.
