= 1986–87 NHL transactions =

The following is a list of all team-to-team transactions that have occurred in the National Hockey League during the 1986–87 NHL season. It lists what team each player has been traded to, signed by, or claimed by, and for which player(s) or draft pick(s), if applicable.

== Trades between teams ==
=== May ===
May 16, 1986	To Boston Bruins Tom McCarthy	To Minnesota North Stars 3rd-rd pick - 1986 entry draft (# 55 - Rob Zettler); 2nd-rd pick - 1987 entry draft (# 35 - Scott McCrady)

=== June ===
June 6, 1986	To Vancouver Canucks Dave Richter; Rich Sutter; 3rd-rd pick - 1986 entry draft (# 49 - Don Gibson)	To Philadelphia Flyers Jean-Jacques Daigneault; 2nd-rd pick - 1986 entry draft (# 28 - Kent Hawley); 5th-rd pick - 1987 entry draft (# 87 - Sean Fabian)
June 6, 1986	To Boston Bruins Cam Neely; 1st-rd pick - 1987 entry draft (# 3 - Glen Wesley)	To Vancouver Canucks Barry Pederson
June 21, 1986	To Buffalo Sabres Scott Arniel	To Winnipeg Jets Gilles Hamel
June 21, 1986	To Quebec Nordiques 2nd-rd pick - 1986 entry draft (# 41 - Stephane Guerard)	To Philadelphia Flyers 2nd-rd pick - 1987 entry draft (# 30 - Jeff Harding)
June 21, 1986	To Philadelphia Flyers Mike Murray	To New York Islanders 5th-rd pick in 1986 entry draft (# 104 - Todd McLellan)
June 25, 1986	To New Jersey Devils Claude Loiselle	To Detroit Red Wings Tim Higgins
June 15, 1986	To Montreal Canadiens future considerations	To Edmonton Oilers Alfie Turcotte

=== July ===
July 3, 1986	To Edmonton Oilers Murray Eaves	To Winnipeg Jets future considerations
July 29, 1986	To Detroit Red Wings Glen Hanlon; 3rd-rd pick - 1987 entry draft (# 47 - Guy Dupuis); 3rd-rd pick - 1988 entry draft (# 52 - Dennis Holland)	To New York Rangers Kelly Kisio; Lane Lambert; Jim Leavins; 5th-rd pick - 1988 entry draft (WIN - # 101 - Benoit LeBeau)^{1}

1. The Rangers' fifth-round pick went to Winnipeg as the result of a trade on June 8, 1987 that sent Brian Mullen and Winnipeg's tenth-round pick in 1987 entry draft to the Rangers in exchange for the Rangers' third-round pick in 1989 entry draft and this pick.

=== August ===
August 7, 1986	To St. Louis Blues Larry Trader	To Detroit Red Wings Lee Norwood
August 18, 1986	To Toronto Maple Leafs Mike Allison	To New York Rangers Walt Poddubny
August 18, 1986	To New Jersey Devils Steve Richmond	To Detroit Red Wings Sam St. Laurent
August 19, 1986	To Montreal Canadiens Brian Hayward	To Winnipeg Jets Steve Penney rights to Jan Ingman

=== September ===
September 8, 1986	To Minnesota North Stars Brian MacLellan	To New York Rangers 3rd-rd pick - 1987 entry draft (# 46 - Simon Gagne)^{1}

1. The trade was for a conditional pick in 1987 entry draft. The condition – the Rangers receives a 3rd-rd pick if MacLellan scores 25 or more goals in the 1986-87 season or a 4th-rd pick if less than 25 goals - was converted on March 3, 1987 scoring his 25th goal of the season.

=== October ===
October 2, 1986	To Buffalo Sabres Craig Muni	To Edmonton Oilers cash
October 2, 1986	To Toronto Maple Leafs 5th-rd pick - 1988 entry draft (# 86 - Len Esau)	To Vancouver Canucks Brad Maxwell
October 3, 1986	To Toronto Maple Leafs Terry Johnson	To Calgary Flames Jim Korn
October 3, 1986	To Buffalo Sabres Jim Korn	To Calgary Flames Brian Engblom
October 3, 1986	To Buffalo Sabres cash	To Pittsburgh Penguins Craig Muni
October 7, 1986	To Hartford Whalers Yves Courteau	To Calgary Flames Mark Paterson
October 3, 1986	To Buffalo Sabres future considerations	To Detroit Red Wings Ric Seiling
October 8, 1986	To Washington Capitals cash	To Pittsburgh Penguins Dwight Schofield
October 9, 1986	To Detroit Red Wings cash	To Pittsburgh Penguins Warren Young
October 15, 1986	To Edmonton Oilers Shawn Evans	To St. Louis Blues Todd Ewen
October 21, 1986	To Hartford Whalers Dave Barr	To St. Louis Blues Tim Bothwell
October 23, 1986	To Edmonton Oilers Clark Donatelli; Jim Wiemer rights to Ville Kentala rights to Reijo Ruotsalainen	To New York Rangers Don Jackson; Mike Golden rights to Miloslav Horava future considerations^{1} (Stu Kulak)
October 24, 1986	To Minnesota North Stars rights to Mark Pavelich	To New York Rangers 4th-rd pick - 1988 entry draft (MIN - # 64 - Jeffrey Stolp)^{2}
October 30, 1986	To Montreal Canadiens Andre Villeneuve	To Philadelphia Flyers Dominic Campedelli

1. Trade completed on March 10, 1987.
2. Minnesota's fourth-round pick was re-acquired as the result of a trade on November 13, 1986 that sent Curt Giles, Tony McKegney and Minnesota's second-round pick in 1988 entry draft to the Rangers in exchange for Bob Brooke and this pick.

=== November ===
November 12, 1986	To Calgary Flames Mike Bullard	To Pittsburgh Penguins Dan Quinn
November 13, 1986	To Minnesota North Stars Bob Brooke; 4th-rd pick - 1988 entry draft (# 64 - Jeffrey Stolp)	To New York Rangers Curt Giles; Tony McKegney; 2nd-rd pick - 1988 entry draft (# 22 - Troy Mallette)
November 18, 1986	To Buffalo Sabres Tom Kurvers	To Montreal Canadiens 2nd-rd pick - 1988 entry draft (# 34 - Martin St. Amour)
November 21, 1986	To Vancouver Canucks 6th-rd pick - 1988 entry draft (# 122 - Phil von Stefenelli)	To Detroit Red Wings Doug Halward

=== December ===
December 2, 1986	To Toronto Maple Leafs Rick Lanz	To Vancouver Canucks Jim Benning; Dan Hodgson
December 12, 1986	To Hartford Whalers Dave Semenko	To Edmonton Oilers 3rd-rd pick - 1988 entry draft (# 53 - Trevor Sim)
December 18, 1986	To Philadelphia Flyers Kjell Samuelsson; 2nd-rd pick - 1989 entry draft (# 34 - Patrik Juhlin)	To New York Rangers Bob Froese

=== January ===
January 1, 1987	To Washington Capitals Bob Crawford; Kelly Miller; Mike Ridley	To New York Rangers Bobby Carpenter; 2nd-rd pick - 1989 entry draft (# 40 - Jason Prosofsky)
January 5, 1987	To Quebec Nordiques Bill Derlago	To Winnipeg Jets 4th-rd pick in 1989 entry draft (# 64 - Mark Brownschidle)
January 8, 1987	To Montreal Canadiens 3rd-rd pick - 1987 entry draft (# 58 - Francois Gravel)	To Winnipeg Jets Steve Rooney
January 12, 1987	To Hartford Whalers Randy Ladouceur	To Detroit Red Wings Dave Barr
January 17, 1987	To Quebec Nordiques Basil McRae; John Ogrodnick; Doug Shedden	To Detroit Red Wings Brent Ashton; Gilbert Delorme; Mark Kumpel
January 21, 1987	To Pittsburgh Penguins Chris Kontos	To New York Rangers Ron Duguay

=== February ===
February 6, 1987	To Boston Bruins Roberto Romano	To Pittsburgh Penguins Pat Riggin
February 14, 1987	To Los Angeles Kings Al Jensen	To Washington Capitals Gary Galley
February 21, 1987	To Minnesota North Stars Brad Maxwell	To New York Rangers future considerations

=== March ===
- Trading Deadline: March 10, 1987

March 2, 1987	To Minnesota North Stars 2nd-rd pick - 1988 entry draft (# 40 - Link Gaetz) cash	To Edmonton Oilers Kent Nilsson
March 5, 1987	To Toronto Maple Leafs Mark Osborne	To New York Rangers Jeff Jackson; 3rd-rd pick - 1989 entry draft (# 45 - Rob Zamuner)
March 5, 1987	To Quebec Nordiques Lane Lambert	To New York Rangers Pat Price
March 6, 1987	To Buffalo Sabres Lee Fogolin Jr. Mark Napier; 4th-rd pick - 1987 entry draft (# 84 - John Bradley)	To Edmonton Oilers Normand Lacombe; Wayne Van Dorp; 4th-rd pick - 1987 entry draft (# 64 - Peter Eriksson)
March 9, 1987	To New Jersey Devils Chris Cichocki; 3rd-rd pick - 1987 entry draft (BUF - # 58 - Andrew MacVicar)^{1}	To Detroit Red Wings Mel Bridgman
March 9, 1987	To Edmonton Oilers Dominic Campedelli	To Philadelphia Flyers Jeff Brubaker
March 10, 1987	To Hartford Whalers Pat Hughes	To St. Louis Blues 10th-rd pick - 1987 entry draft (# 207 - Andy Cesarski)
March 10, 1987	To Los Angeles Kings Bobby Carpenter; Tom Laidlaw	To New York Rangers Jeff Crossman; Marcel Dionne; 3rd-rd pick in 1988 entry draft (MIN - # 60 - Murray Garbutt)^{2}
March 10, 1987	To Minnesota North Stars Raimo Helminen	To New York Rangers future considerations
March 10, 1987	To Vancouver Canucks Raimo Summanen	To Edmonton Oilers Moe Lemay
March 10, 1987	To Boston Bruins 4th-rd pick - 1987 entry draft (# 67 - Darwin McPherson)	To Minnesota North Stars Paul Boutilier

1. New Jersey's third-round pick went to Buffalo as the result of a trade on June 13, 1987 that sent Tom Kurvers to New Jersey in exchange for New Jersey's tenth-round pick in 1989 entry draft and this pick.
2. The Rangers' third-round pick went to the Minnesota as the result of a trade on October 11, 1988 that sent Brian Lawton, Igor Liba and the rights to Rick Bennett to the Rangers in exchange for Paul Jerrard, Mark Tinordi, the rights to Mike Sullivan, the rights to Bret Barnett and this pick.

=== April ===
April 22, 1987	To Calgary Flames cash	To Chicago Blackhawks Mark Paterson

== Additional sources ==
- hockeydb.com - search for player and select "show trades"
- "NHL trades for 1985-1986". NHL Trade Tracker.
