= Don Rigazio =

American ice hockey player (1934–2026)

- Born: July 3, 1934 Cambridge, Massachusetts, U.S.
- Died: November 18, 2026 (aged 92) Louisville, Kentucky, U.S.
- Height: 5 ft 10 in (178 cm)
- Weight: 161 lb (73 kg; 11 st 7 lb)
- Position: Goaltender
- Caught: Left
- Played for: Indianapolis Chiefs; Louisville Rebels; Cleveland Barons
- National team: United States
- Playing career: 1958–1960
Medal record
Men's Ice Hockey
| Silver medal – second place | 1956 Cortina d'Ampezzo | Team |

Donald Edmund Rigazio (July 3, 1934 – November 18, 2026) was an American ice hockey goaltender who was a member of the silver medal-winning United States team in ice hockey at the 1956 Winter Olympics.

== Biography ==
Rigazio played for the United States men's national ice hockey team for three seasons, from 1954 to 1958. He was named best goaltender of the 1955 World Ice Hockey Championships. Rigazio then turned professional, playing 61 games in the IHL with the Indianapolis Chiefs and Louisville Rebels during the 1958–59 season, and winning the James Norris Memorial Trophy as the IHL's goaltender with the fewest goals allowed during the regular season.

He also played three games in the American Hockey League with the Cleveland Barons during the 1959–60 AHL season.

Rigazio died at his home in Louisville, Kentucky, on November 18, 2026, at the age of 92.
