= Hamilton Tiger Cubs =

Canadian junior ice hockey team (1953–1960)

- City: Hamilton, Ontario
- League: Ontario Hockey Association
- Operated: 1953–1960
- Home arena: Hamilton Forum

Franchise history
- 1946–1953: Windsor Spitfires
- 1953–1960: Hamilton Tiger Cubs
- 1960–1974: Hamilton Red Wings
- 1974–1978: Hamilton/St. Catharines Fincups
- 1978–1984: Brantford Alexanders
- 1984–1988: Hamilton Steelhawks
- 1988–1996: Niagara Falls Thunder
- 1996–present: Erie Otters

The Hamilton Tiger Cubs were a Canadian junior ice hockey team in the Ontario Hockey Association (OHA) from 1953 to 1960. The team was based in Hamilton, Ontario, playing home games at the Hamilton Forum.

== History ==
In 1953, the Windsor Spitfires were sold and relocated becoming the Hamilton Tiger Cubs. The Tiger Cubs played home games at the Hamilton Forum.

In the 1953–54 OHA season, goaltender Dennis Riggin received the Dave Pinkney Trophy for the lowest team goals against average.

In the 1957–58 OHA season, centre Murray Oliver received the Red Tilson Trophy as the OHA's most valuable player. In the same season, the Tiger Cubs reached the OHA finals for the J. Ross Robertson Cup, and were defeated by the Toronto Marlboros four games to none, with a tied game.

The Tiger Cubs had three last-place finishes in the OHA standings within five seasons as of 1960, and were rumored to become the Red Wings. Renamed the Hamilton Red Wings as of the 1960–61 OHA season, they were affiliated with the Detroit Red Wings.

== Notable alumni ==
Jerry Sullivan was an All-American centre for the Michigan Tech Huskies in 1962. Defenceman Henry Åkervall played for the Canada men's national team at the 1964 Winter Olympics.

Brian Kilrea later coached junior hockey, and was inducted into the Hockey Hall of Fame in 2003. Pat Quinn coached several teams in the National Hockey League and the Canada men's national team, and was inducted into the Hockey Hall of Fame in 2016.

List of National Hockey League or World Hockey Association alumni:

- Dave Amadio
- Don Blackburn
- Cummy Burton
- Bob Dillabough
- Lloyd Haddon
- Jack Hendrickson
- Larry Hillman
- Larry Jeffrey
- Brian Kilrea
- Lowell MacDonald
- Pit Martin
- Billy McNeill
- Stu McNeill
- Hillary Menard
- John Miszuk
- Dan Olesevich
- Murray Oliver
- Nick Polano
- Pat Quinn
- George Ranieri
- Dennis Riggin
- Wayne Rivers
- Len Ronson
- Brian Smith
- Bob Wall
- Carl Wetzel
- Howie Young

== Season-by-season results ==
Regular season and playoffs results:

Legend: GP = Games played, W = Wins, L = Losses, T = Ties, Pts = Points, GF = Goals for, GA = Goals against

Memorial Cup champions	OHA champions	OHA finalists

Season	Regular season									Playoffs
Season	GP	W	L	T	Pts	Pct	GF	GA	Finish	Playoffs
1953–54	58	31	24	3	65	0.560	222	208	3rd OHA	Won quarterfinal (Guelph Biltmores) 3–0; Lost semifinal (Toronto Marlboros) 3–0–1
1954–55	49	21	23	5	47	0.480	181	173	5th OHA	Lost quarterfinal (Guelph Biltmores) 3–0
1955–56	48	13	30	5	31	0.323	171	250	7th OHA	Did not qualify
1956–57	52	24	26	2	50	0.481	170	191	5th OHA	Lost quarterfinal (Toronto Marlboros) 3–1
1957–58	52	27	18	7	61	0.587	200	176	2nd OHA	Won quarterfinal (Peterborough Petes) 3–1–1; Won semifinal (Toronto St. Michael's Majors) 2–1–2; Lost OHA final (Toronto Marlboros) 4–0–1
1958–59	54	11	35	8	30	0.278	167	229	7th OHA	Did not qualify
1959–60	48	10	34	4	24	0.250	158	251	7th OHA	Did not qualify
