= 1986–87 NHL season =

National Hockey League season

- League: National Hockey League
- Sport: Ice hockey
- Duration: October 9, 1986 – May 31, 1987
- Games: 80
- Teams: 21
- TV partner(s): CBC, Canwest/Global, SRC (Canada); ESPN (United States)

Draft
- Top draft pick: Joe Murphy
- Picked by: Detroit Red Wings

Regular season
- Presidents' Trophy: Edmonton Oilers
- Season MVP: Wayne Gretzky (Oilers)
- Top scorer: Wayne Gretzky (Oilers)

Playoffs
- Playoffs MVP: Ron Hextall (Flyers)

Stanley Cup
- Champions: Edmonton Oilers
- Runners-up: Philadelphia Flyers

NHL seasons
- 1985–86 1987–88

The 1986–87 NHL season was the 70th season of the National Hockey League. The Edmonton Oilers won the Stanley Cup by beating the Philadelphia Flyers four games to three in the Cup Final.

== League business ==
=== Chicago renaming ===
The Chicago-based club officially changed their name from the two-worded "Black Hawks" to the one-worded "Blackhawks" based on the spelling found in their original franchise documents.

=== Entry draft ===
The 1986 NHL entry draft was held on June 21, at the Montreal Forum in Montreal, Quebec. Joe Murphy was selected first overall by the Detroit Red Wings.

== Regular season ==
The Oilers won their second straight Presidents' Trophy as the top team and Wayne Gretzky won his eighth straight Hart Memorial Trophy and his seventh straight Art Ross Trophy.

On November 26, 1986, Toronto's Borje Salming was accidentally cut in the face by a skate, requiring more than 200 stitches. It was the third injury to his face and Salming returned to play wearing a visor.

A bombshell was exploded when it was announced that Pat Quinn had been expelled from the NHL pending an investigation of conflict of interest. It was reported that while serving as coach of the Los Angeles Kings, Quinn signed a contract to become president and general manager of the Vancouver Canucks. In due course, NHL president John Ziegler barred Quinn from coaching in the NHL until 1990-91.

On January 22, 1987, a massive blizzard resulted in only 334 spectators attending the game between the New Jersey Devils and the Calgary Flames at the Brendan Byrne Arena, leading to the Devils dubbing the spectators the "334 Club".

There was trouble brewing for Bryan Trottier when he authored an article in the publication The Hockey News criticizing officials for failing to call penalties. This was brought to the attention of NHL president John Ziegler who fined Trottier $1,000.

On April 4, 1987, the Islanders' captain Denis Potvin became the first NHL defenceman to reach 1000 points. A shot by the Islanders' Mikko Mäkelä deflected in off Potvin's arm in a 6–6 shootout between the Islanders and Sabres.

=== Final standings ===
Note: W = Wins, L = Losses, T = Ties, GF= Goals For, GA = Goals Against, Pts = Points, PIM = Penalties in minutes

==== Prince of Wales Conference ====
Adams Division
	GP	W	L	T	GF	GA	Pts
Hartford Whalers	80	43	30	7	287	270	93
Montreal Canadiens	80	41	29	10	277	241	92
Boston Bruins	80	39	34	7	301	276	85
Quebec Nordiques	80	31	39	10	267	276	72
Buffalo Sabres	80	28	44	8	280	308	64

Patrick Division
	GP	W	L	T	GF	GA	Pts
Philadelphia Flyers	80	46	26	8	310	245	100
Washington Capitals	80	38	32	10	285	278	86
New York Islanders	80	35	33	12	279	281	82
New York Rangers	80	34	38	8	307	323	76
Pittsburgh Penguins	80	30	38	12	297	290	72
New Jersey Devils	80	29	45	6	293	368	64

==== Clarence Campbell Conference ====
Norris Division
	GP	W	L	T	GF	GA	Pts
St. Louis Blues	80	32	33	15	281	293	79
Detroit Red Wings	80	34	36	10	260	274	78
Chicago Blackhawks	80	29	37	14	290	310	72
Toronto Maple Leafs	80	32	42	6	286	319	70
Minnesota North Stars	80	30	40	10	296	314	70

Smythe Division
	GP	W	L	T	GF	GA	Pts
Edmonton Oilers	80	50	24	6	372	284	106
Calgary Flames	80	46	31	3	318	289	95
Winnipeg Jets	80	40	32	8	279	271	88
Los Angeles Kings	80	31	41	8	318	341	70
Vancouver Canucks	80	29	43	8	282	314	66

== Playoffs ==
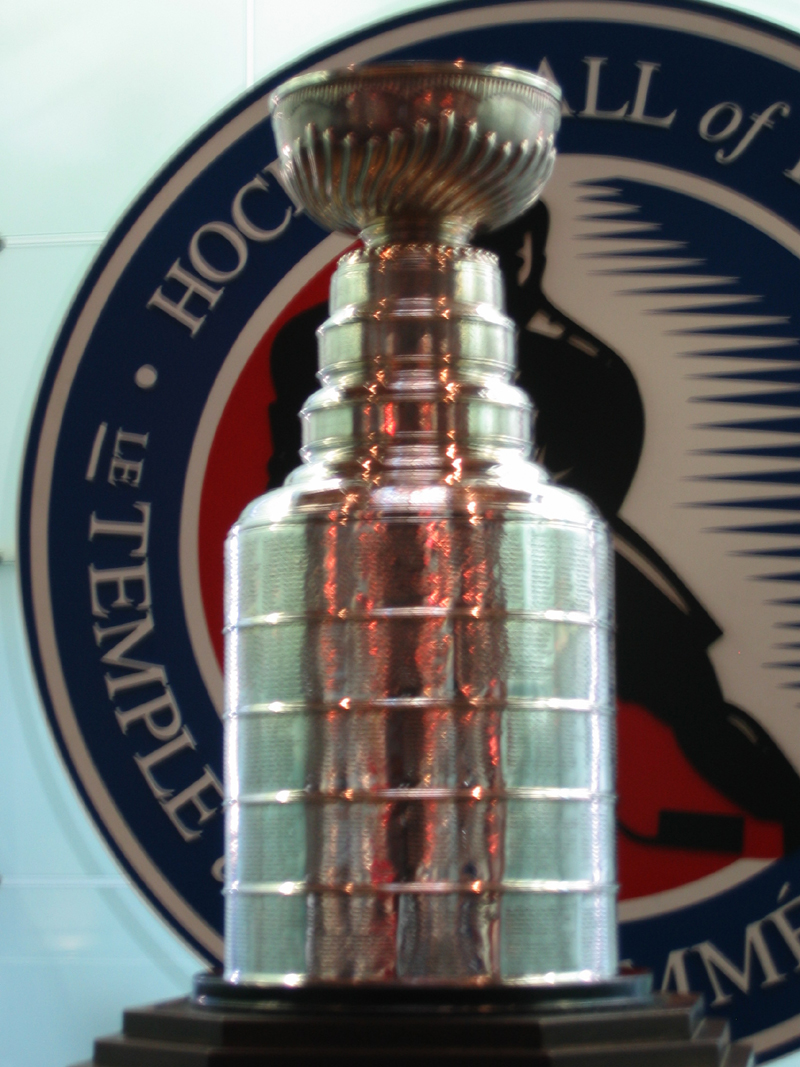
The Stanley Cup

=== Bracket ===
The top four teams in each division qualified for the playoffs. This was the first year that all rounds were competed in a best-of-seven series (scores in the bracket indicate the number of games won in each best-of-seven series) after the division semifinals were expanded from a best-of-five format to reduce the number of upsets. In the division semifinals, the fourth seeded team in each division played against the division winner from their division. The other series matched the second and third place teams from the divisions. The two winning teams from each division's semifinals then met in the division finals. The two division winners of each conference then played in the conference finals. The two conference winners then advanced to the Stanley Cup Final.

Division semifinals	Division finals
A1	Hartford	2
A4	Quebec	4
A4	Quebec	3
A2	Montreal	4
A2	Montreal	4
A3	Boston	0
Prince of Wales Conference
P1	Philadelphia	4
P4	NY Rangers	2
P1	Philadelphia	4
P3	NY Islanders	3
P2	Washington	3
P3	NY Islanders	4
N1	St. Louis	2
N4	Toronto	4
N4	Toronto	3
N2	Detroit	4
N2	Detroit	4
N3	Chicago	0
Clarence Campbell Conference
S1	Edmonton	4
S4	Los Angeles	1
S1	Edmonton	4
S3	Winnipeg	0
S2	Calgary	2
S3	Winnipeg	4

Conference finals
A2	Montreal	2
P1	Philadelphia	4
N2	Detroit	1
S1	Edmonton	4

Stanley Cup Finals
P1	Philadelphia	3
S1	Edmonton	4

== Awards ==
1987 NHL awards
Presidents' Trophy: Team with most points, regular season	Edmonton Oilers
Prince of Wales Trophy: (Wales Conference playoff champion)	Philadelphia Flyers
Clarence S. Campbell Bowl: (Campbell Conference playoff champion)	Edmonton Oilers
Art Ross Trophy: (Top scorer, regular season)	Wayne Gretzky, Edmonton Oilers
Bill Masterton Memorial Trophy: (Perseverance, sportsmanship, and dedication)	Doug Jarvis, Hartford Whalers
Calder Memorial Trophy: (Best first-year player)	Luc Robitaille, Los Angeles Kings
Conn Smythe Trophy: (Most valuable player, playoffs)	Ron Hextall, Philadelphia Flyers
Frank J. Selke Trophy: (Best defensive forward)	Dave Poulin, Philadelphia Flyers
Hart Memorial Trophy: (Most valuable player, regular season)	Wayne Gretzky, Edmonton Oilers
Jack Adams Award: (Best coach)	Jacques Demers, Detroit Red Wings
James Norris Memorial Trophy: (Best defenceman)	Ray Bourque, Boston Bruins
Lady Byng Memorial Trophy: (Excellence and sportsmanship)	Joe Mullen, Calgary Flames
Lester B. Pearson Award: (Outstanding player, regular season)	Wayne Gretzky, Edmonton Oilers
NHL Plus/Minus Award: (Player with best plus/minus record)	Wayne Gretzky, Edmonton Oilers
William M. Jennings Trophy: (Goaltender(s) of team(s) with best goaltending record)	Patrick Roy/Brian Hayward, Montreal Canadiens
Vezina Trophy: (Best goaltender)	Ron Hextall, Philadelphia Flyers

=== All-Star teams ===
First Team	Position	Second Team
Ron Hextall, Philadelphia Flyers	G	Mike Liut, Hartford Whalers
Ray Bourque, Boston Bruins	D	Larry Murphy, Washington Capitals
Mark Howe, Philadelphia Flyers	D	Al MacInnis, Calgary Flames
Wayne Gretzky, Edmonton Oilers	C	Mario Lemieux, Pittsburgh Penguins
Jari Kurri, Edmonton Oilers	RW	Tim Kerr, Philadelphia Flyers
Michel Goulet, Quebec Nordiques	LW	Luc Robitaille, Los Angeles Kings

Source: NHL

== Player statistics ==
=== Scoring leaders ===
Note: GP = Games played; G = Goals; A = Assists; Pts = Points, PIM = Penalties in minutes, PPG = Powerplay Goals, SHG = Shorthanded Goals, GWG = Game Winning Goals

Player	Team	GP	G	A	Pts	PIM	+/-	PPG	SHG	GWG
Wayne Gretzky	Edmonton Oilers	79	62	121	183	28	+70	13	7	4
Jari Kurri	Edmonton Oilers	79	54	54	108	41	+35	12	5	10
Mario Lemieux	Pittsburgh Penguins	63	54	53	107	57	+13	19	0	4
Mark Messier	Edmonton Oilers	77	37	70	107	73	+21	7	4	5
Doug Gilmour	St. Louis Blues	80	42	63	105	58	-2	17	1	2
Dino Ciccarelli	Minnesota North Stars	80	52	51	103	88	+10	22	0	5
Dale Hawerchuk	Winnipeg Jets	80	47	53	100	52	+3	10	0	4
Michel Goulet	Quebec Nordiques	75	49	47	96	61	-12	17	0	6
Tim Kerr	Philadelphia Flyers	75	58	37	95	57	+38	26	0	10
Ray Bourque	Boston Bruins	78	23	72	95	36	+44	6	1	3

Source: NHL.

=== Leading goaltenders ===
Minimum 2000 min. GP = Games played; Min = Minutes played; W = Wins; L = Losses; T = Ties; SO = Shutouts; GAA = Goals against average; Sv% = Save percentage

Goalie	Team	GP	Min	W	L	T	SO	GAA	Sv%
Brian Hayward	Montreal Canadiens	37	2178	19	13	4	1	2.81	.894
Patrick Roy	Montreal Canadiens	46	2686	22	16	6	1	2.94	.892
Ron Hextall	Philadelphia Flyers	66	3799	37	21	6	1	3.00	.902
Pete Peeters	Washington Capitals	37	2002	17	11	4	0	3.21	.885
Mike Liut	Hartford Whalers	59	3476	31	22	5	4	3.23	.885
Eldon Reddick	Winnipeg Jets	48	2762	21	21	4	0	3.24	.881
Bob Mason	Washington Capitals	45	2536	20	18	5	0	3.24	.890
Kelly Hrudey	New York Islanders	46	2634	25	15	7	0	3.30	.881
Bill Ranford	Boston Bruins	41	2231	16	20	2	3	3.33	.891
Clint Malarchuk	Quebec Nordiques	54	3092	18	26	9	1	3.40	.884

== Coaches ==
=== Patrick Division ===
- New Jersey Devils: Doug Carpenter
- New York Islanders: Terry Simpson
- New York Rangers: Tom Webster
- Philadelphia Flyers: Mike Keenan
- Pittsburgh Penguins: Bob Berry
- Washington Capitals: Bryan Murray

=== Adams Division ===
- Boston Bruins: Terry O'Reilly
- Buffalo Sabres: Scotty Bowman and Craig Ramsay
- Hartford Whalers: Jack Evans
- Montreal Canadiens: Jean Perron
- Quebec Nordiques: Michel Bergeron

=== Norris Division ===
- Chicago Blackhawks: Bob Pulford
- Detroit Red Wings: Jacques Demers
- Minnesota North Stars: Lorne Henning and Glen Sonmor
- St. Louis Blues: Jacques Martin
- Toronto Maple Leafs: John Brophy

=== Smythe Division ===
- Calgary Flames: Bob Johnson
- Edmonton Oilers: Glen Sather
- Los Angeles Kings: Pat Quinn and Mike Murphy
- Vancouver Canucks: Tom Watt
- Winnipeg Jets: Dan Maloney

== Debuts ==
The following is a list of players of note who played their first NHL game in 1986–87 (listed with their first team, asterisk(*) marks debut in playoffs):

- Gary Roberts, Calgary Flames
- Joe Nieuwendyk, Calgary Flames
- Dave Manson, Chicago Blackhawks
- Joe Murphy, Detroit Red Wings
- Steve Chiasson, Detroit Red Wings
- Kelly Buchberger*, Edmonton Oilers
- Jimmy Carson, Los Angeles Kings
- Luc Robitaille, Los Angeles Kings
- Steve Duchesne, Los Angeles Kings
- Craig Berube, Philadelphia Flyers
- Ron Hextall, Philadelphia Flyers
- Vincent Damphousse, Toronto Maple Leafs
- Fredrik Olausson, Winnipeg Jets

== Last games ==
The following is a list of players of note that played their last game in the NHL in 1986–87 (listed with their last team):

- Thomas Gradin, Boston Bruins
- Mike Milbury, Boston Bruins
- Lee Fogolin, Buffalo Sabres
- Don Lever, Buffalo Sabres
- Gilbert Perreault, Buffalo Sabres
- Phil Russell, Buffalo Sabres
- Doug Risebrough, Calgary Flames
- Murray Bannerman, Chicago Blackhawks
- Darryl Sutter, Chicago Blackhawks
- Danny Gare, Edmonton Oilers
- Wayne Babych, Hartford Whalers
- Peter McNab, New Jersey Devils
- Mike Bossy, New York Islanders
- Chico Resch, Philadelphia Flyers (Last player born in the 1940s)

== Broadcasting ==
In Canada, the Molson-sponsored Hockey Night in Canada on CBC continued to air Saturday night regular season games, but sponsor Carling-O'Keefe's rights fell into limbo after CTV pulled out of its sub-license prior to the season. Things became problematic when the 1987 Stanley Cup playoffs opened with Carling O'Keefe still without a network. The problems peaked when the Montreal–Quebec second-round playoff series opened without Molson being allowed to broadcast from Quebec City, leaving Games 3 and 4 off of English-language television altogether. This led to a hastily arranged syndicated package on a chain of channels that would one day form the basis of the Global Television Network. The deal between Carling O'Keefe and the Canwest/Global consortium (with a few CBC and CTV affiliates sprinkled in for good measure) came just in time for game six of the Montreal-Quebec series on April 30. These Carling O'Keefe/Canwest/Global broadcasts were aired under the name Stanley Cup '87.

This was the second season of the league's three-year U.S. national broadcast rights deal with ESPN. The contract called for the network to air up to 33 regular season games each season as well as the All-Star Game and the playoffs.

== See also ==
- List of Stanley Cup champions
- 1986 NHL entry draft
- 1986–87 NHL transactions
- NHL All-Rookie Team
- Rendez-vous '87
- 1986 in sports
- 1987 in sports
- Easter Epic
