= Leo Lamoureux =

Canadian ice hockey player

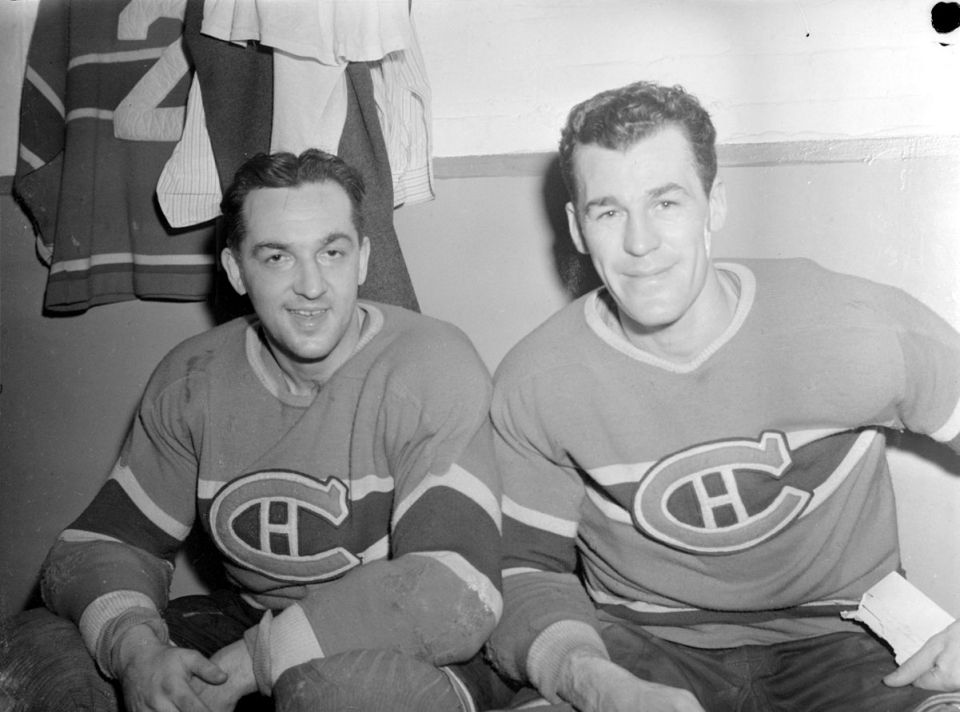
- Leo Lamoureux and Émile Bouchard in 1945.
- Born: October 1, 1916 Espanola, Ontario, Canada
- Died: January 11, 1961 (aged 44) Indianapolis, Indiana, USA
- Height: 5 ft 11 in (180 cm)
- Weight: 185 lb (84 kg; 13 st 3 lb)
- Position: Defence
- Shot: Left
- Played for: Montreal Canadiens; Earls Court Rangers
- Playing career: 1936–1960

Leo Peter Lamoureux (October 1, 1916 – January 11, 1961) was a Canadian ice hockey defenceman. He played for the Montreal Canadiens in the National Hockey League from 1942 to 1947. The rest of his career, which lasted from 1936 to 1960, was spent in the minor leagues. He won the Stanley Cup twice with Montreal, in 1944 and 1946.

== Biography ==
Lamoureux was born in Espanola, Ontario, but grew up in Kirkland Lake, Ontario. He was named a Quebec Senior Hockey League First team All-Star in 1940. Montreal called him up for the 1941–42 season, and he played in the NHL until 1947. He won the Stanley Cup twice with Montreal, in 1944 and 1946. After leaving the NHL, Lamoureux became a player/coach with the Indianapolis Chiefs. During the 1960-61 season, Lamoureux became ill and entered an Indianapolis hospital where he was diagnosed with acute hepatitis, from which he died January 11, 1961.

== Career statistics ==
=== Regular season and playoffs ===
			Regular season					Playoffs
Season	Team	League	GP	G	A	Pts	PIM	GP	G	A	Pts	PIM
1932–33	Timmins Combines	NOHA	—	—	—	—	—	—	—	—	—	—
1932–33	Timmins Combines	Al-Cup	—	—	—	—	—	6	1	1	2	4
1933–34	Timmins Combines	NOHA	—	—	—	—	—	—	—	—	—	—
1933–34	Toronto CCM	TMHL	5	1	0	1	2	—	—	—	—	—
1934–35	Oshawa Generals	OHA	14	6	14	20	8	2	4	0	4	4
1935–36	Timmins Black Shirts	NOHA	14	10	11	21	19	—	—	—	—	—
1936–37	Kirkland Lake Blue Devils	NOHA	6	4	5	9	0	4	1	0	1	2
1937–38	Windsor Chrysler	MOHL	31	13	15	28	36	8	4	5	9	6
1938–39	Earls Court Rangers	ENL	—	7	7	14	—	—	—	—	—	—
1939–40	Cornwall Royals	QSHL	29	7	9	16	29	5	1	2	3	6
1940–41	Hamilton Dofascos	OHA Sr	28	12	9	21	50	6	1	4	5	8
1941–42	Montreal Canadiens	NHL	1	0	0	0	0	—	—	—	—	—
1941–42	Washington Lions	AHL	55	5	19	24	40	2	0	2	2	0
1942–43	Montreal Canadiens	NHL	46	2	16	18	53	—	—	—	—	—
1942–43	Washington Lions	AHL	1	1	0	1	0	—	—	—	—	—
1943–44	Montreal Canadiens	NHL	45	8	23	31	32	9	0	3	3	8
1944–45	Montreal Canadiens	NHL	49	2	22	24	62	6	1	1	2	2
1945–46	Montreal Canadiens	NHL	45	5	7	12	18	9	0	2	2	2
1946–47	Montreal Canadiens	NHL	50	2	11	13	14	4	0	0	0	4
1947–48	Buffalo Bisons	AHL	15	1	3	4	2	—	—	—	—	—
1947–48	Springfield Indians	AHL	40	1	14	15	16	—	—	—	—	—
1948–49	Shawinigan Falls Cataractes	QSHL	31	1	18	19	26	—	—	—	—	—
1949–50	Shawinigan Falls Cataractes	QSHL	22	1	15	16	8	—	—	—	—	—
1950–51	Detroit Hettche	IHL	13	0	4	4	12	—	—	—	—	—
1950–51	Charlottetown Islanders	MMHL	1	0	1	1	12	—	—	—	—	—
1951–52	Charlottetown Islanders	MMHL	1	0	0	0	0	—	—	—	—	—
1952–53	North Bay Trappers	NOHA	8	0	4	4	6	—	—	—	—	—
1955–56	Indianapolis Chiefs	IHL	24	0	5	5	19	—	—	—	—	—
1956–57	Indianapolis Chiefs	IHL	1	0	0	0	)	—	—	—	—	—
1959–60	Cleveland Barons	AHL	5	0	1	1	0	—	—	—	—	—
NHL totals			236	19	79	98	179	28	1	6	7	16

== See also ==
- Leo P. Lamoureux Memorial Trophy
