= Dan Olesevich =

Canadian ice hockey player (1937–1983)

- Born: September 16, 1937 Port Colborne, Ontario, Canada
- Died: July 15, 1983 (aged 45) Tilbury, Ontario, Canada
- Height: 6 ft 0 in (183 cm)
- Weight: 170 lb (77 kg; 12 st 2 lb)
- Position: Goaltender
- Caught: Left
- Played for: New York Rangers
- Playing career: 1957–1962

Dan Olesevich (September 16, 1937 – July 15, 1983) was a Canadian professional ice hockey goaltender who played in one National Hockey League game for the New York Rangers during the 1961–62 season, on October 21, 1961 against the Detroit Red Wings. The rest of his career, which lasted from 1957 to 1962, was spent in the minor leagues.

== Career statistics ==
=== Regular season and playoffs ===
			Regular season									Playoffs
Season	Team	League	GP	W	L	T	MIN	GA	SO	GAA	SV%	GP	W	L	MIN	GA	SO	GAA	SV%
1953–54	Hamilton Tiger Cubs	OHA	5	—	—	—	300	23	0	4.60	—	—	—	—	—	—	—	—	—
1955–56	Hamilton Tiger Cubs	OHA	1	—	—	—	60	6	0	6.00	—	—	—	—	—	—	—	—	—
1956–57	Hamilton Tiger Cubs	OHA	2	0	2	0	120	12	0	6.00	—	—	—	—	—	—	—	—	—
1957–58	Edmonton Flyers	WHL	1	1	0	0	60	1	0	1.00	—	—	—	—	—	—	—	—	—
1957–58	Edmonton Oil Kings	M-Cup	—	—	—	—	—	—	—	—	—	4	0	4	240	20	0	5.00	—
1958–59	Charlotte Checkers	EHL	—	—	—	—	—	—	—	—	—	—	—	—	—	—	—	—	—
1958–59	Johnstown Jets	EHL	—	—	—	—	—	—	—	—	—	—	—	—	—	—	—	—	—
1958–59	Windsor Bulldogs	OHA Sr	26	—	—	—	1560	90	1	3.46	—	—	—	—	—	—	—	—	—
1961–62	New York Rangers	NHL	1	0	0	1	30	2	0	4.12	.895	—	—	—	—	—	—	—	—
NHL totals			1	0	0	1	30	2	0	4.12	.895	—	—	—	—	—	—	—	—

== See also ==
- List of players who played only one game in the NHL
