= Colin Chin =

American ice hockey player

- Born: August 28, 1961 (age 64) Fort Wayne, Indiana, U.S.
- Height: 5 ft 8 in (173 cm)
- Weight: 165 lb (75 kg; 11 st 11 lb)
- Position: Center
- Shot: Left
- Played for: AHL; Baltimore Skipjacks; IHL; Fort Wayne Komets
- NHL draft: Undrafted
- Playing career: 1985–1996

Colin Chin (born August 28, 1961) is a retired American professional ice hockey player.

Chin played 11 seasons of professional hockey, including 10 seasons and 660 games with his hometown club the Fort Wayne Komets of the International Hockey League (IHL). He and helped the Komets capture the 1992–93 Turner Cup, and also served as a player coach for the Komets during the 1994–95 IHL season.

On November 17, 2007, Chin was inducted into the Komet Hall of Fame. His jersey number #26 was retired on November 17, 2007.

== Career statistics ==
			Regular season					Playoffs
Season	Team	League	GP	G	A	Pts	PIM	GP	G	A	Pts	PIM
1979–80	Paddock Pools	GLJHL	33	19	32	51	42	—	—	—	—	—
1982–83	U. of Illinois-Chicago	CCHA	33	13	9	22	10	—	—	—	—	—
1983–84	U. of Illinois-Chicago	CCHA	35	11	25	36	14	—	—	—	—	—
1984–85	U. of Illinois-Chicago	CCHA	38	23	42	65	22	—	—	—	—	—
1985–86	Baltimore Skipjacks	AHL	78	17	28	45	38	—	—	—	—	—
1986–87	Fort Wayne Komets	IHL	75	33	42	75	35	9	3	1	4	12
1987–88	Fort Wayne Komets	IHL	75	31	35	66	60	6	4	0	4	4
1988–89	Fort Wayne Komets	IHL	76	21	35	56	71	11	5	4	9	8
1989–90	Fort Wayne Komets	IHL	74	21	38	59	79	2	0	2	2	2
1990–91	Fort Wayne Komets	IHL	65	18	35	53	69	17	6	6	12	25
1991–92	Fort Wayne Komets	IHL	73	35	55	90	64	7	3	6	9	8
1992–93	Fort Wayne Komets	IHL	69	30	51	81	44	8	5	2	7	10
1993–94	Fort Wayne Komets	IHL	81	36	64	100	71	18	9	10	19	24
1994–95	Fort Wayne Komets	IHL	22	10	15	25	10	3	0	0	0	2
1995–96	Fort Wayne Komets	IHL	50	11	20	31	36	5	4	1	5	6
IHL totals			660	246	390	636	539	86	39	32	71	101

== Awards and honors ==
Award	Year
IHL Ironman Award	1993–94
