= 2021 Kelly Cup playoffs =

Tournament details
- Dates: June 7 – July 2, 2021
- Teams: 8

Final positions
- Champions: Fort Wayne Komets
- Runner-up: South Carolina Stingrays

Tournament statistics
- Scoring leader(s): Anthony Nellis (Fort Wayne) (13 points)

Awards
- MVP: Stephen Harper

The 2021 Kelly Cup playoffs of the ECHL began on June 7 following the conclusion of the 2020–21 ECHL regular season, and ended on July 2 with the Fort Wayne Komets winning their first Kelly Cup over the South Carolina Stingrays in four games.

== Playoff format ==
The qualification and with the top four teams from each conference at the end of the regular season. Due to the COVID-19 pandemic, only 14 of the 26 member teams participated in the season, the playoff field was cut from 16 teams to eight, and there were no divisions. As the start of the season was delayed and extended to later in the year than normal, each playoff series is a best-of-five tournament, down from the previous 2019 playoffs and planned 2020 playoffs that consisted of best-of-seven series.

Due to the postseason being pushed later into the year than typical, both the South Carolina Stingrays and Wichita Thunder were forced to play home games out of their practice rinks over scheduling conflicts with their normal home arenas.

== Playoff seeds ==
After the regular season, eight teams qualify for the playoffs. The Wichita Thunder were the first team to qualify during the regular season on May 16. Due to the imbalanced scheduling during the pandemic, teams were seeded by points percentage.

Final seeds and points percentages:

=== Eastern Conference ===
1. Florida Everblades – Brabham Cup winners, conference champions, .667 pts%
2. Greenville Swamp Rabbits – .632 pts%
3. Indy Fuel – .594 pts%
4. South Carolina Stingrays – .579 pts%

=== Western Conference ===
1. Allen Americans – Conference champions, .653 pts%
2. Wichita Thunder – .634 pts%
3. Fort Wayne Komets – .618 pts%
4. Utah Grizzlies – .563 pts%

== Playoff bracket ==
Final results.

Conference Semifinals
E1	Florida Everblades	2
E4	South Carolina Stingrays	3
Eastern Conference
E2	Greenville Swamp Rabbits	3
E3	Indy Fuel	1
W1	Allen Americans	3
W4	Utah Grizzlies	0
Western Conference
W2	Wichita Thunder	2
W3	Fort Wayne Komets	3

Conference Finals
E4	South Carolina Stingrays	3
E2	Greenville Swamp Rabbits	1
W1	Allen Americans	1
W3	Fort Wayne Komets	3

Kelly Cup Finals
E4	South Carolina Stingrays	1
W3	Fort Wayne Komets	3

== Conference semifinals ==
=== Eastern Conference ===
==== (1) Florida Everblades vs. (4) South Carolina Stingrays ====
June 7	Florida Everblades	2–3	OT	South Carolina Stingrays	Carolina Ice Palace	Recap
5:22 – Levko Koper (1)		First period		Matthew Weis (1) – pp – 10:02
No scoring		Second period		No scoring
0:22 – Mike Neville (1)		Third period		Matthew Weis (2) – 11:28
No scoring		First overtime period		Dan DeSalvo (1) – 3:25
Jake Hildebrand 31 saves / 34 shots		Goalie stats		Hunter Shepard 28 saves / 30 shots

June 9	Florida Everblades	5–4	South Carolina Stingrays	Carolina Ice Palace	Recap

June 12	South Carolina Stingrays	1–5	Florida Everblades	Hertz Arena	Recap

June 13	South Carolina Stingrays	4–2	Florida Everblades	Hertz Arena	Recap

June 14	South Carolina Stingrays	3–2	Florida Everblades	Hertz Arena	Recap

South Carolina won series 3–2

==== (2) Greenville Swamp Rabbits vs. (3) Indy Fuel ====
June 8	Greenville Swamp Rabbits	2–0	Indy Fuel	Indiana Farmers Coliseum	Recap

June 10	Indy Fuel	1–3	Greenville Swamp Rabbits	Bon Secours Wellness Arena	Recap

June 11	Indy Fuel	3–2	Greenville Swamp Rabbits	Bon Secours Wellness Arena	Recap

June 12	Indy Fuel	2–3	Greenville Swamp Rabbits	Bon Secours Wellness Arena	Recap

Greenville won series 3–1

=== Western Conference ===
==== (1) Allen Americans vs. (4) Utah Grizzlies ====
June 8	Utah Grizzlies	1–3	Allen Americans	Allen Event Center	Recap

June 9	Utah Grizzlies	2–4	Allen Americans	Allen Event Center	Recap

June 11	Allen Americans	4–3	2OT	Utah Grizzlies	Maverik Center	Recap

Allen won series 3–0

==== (2) Wichita Thunder vs. (3) Fort Wayne Komets ====
June 8	Fort Wayne Komets	3–2	Wichita Thunder	Wichita Ice Center	Recap
No scoring		First period	No scoring
Anthony Nellis (1) – 17:30		Second period	9:05 – Gordie Green (1)
Randy Gazzola (1) – 10:22; Anthony Nellis (2) – 19:35		Third period	7:15 – Ryan White (1)
Dylan Ferguson 36 saves / 38 shots		Goalie stats	Evan Buitenhuis 29 saves / 32 shots

June 9	Fort Wayne Komets	2–5	Wichita Thunder	Wichita Ice Center	Recap

June 11	Wichita Thunder	0–3	Fort Wayne Komets	Allen County War Memorial Coliseum	Recap

June 12	Wichita Thunder	4–2	Fort Wayne Komets	Allen County War Memorial Coliseum	Recap

June 14	Wichita Thunder	3–4	OT	Fort Wayne Komets	Allen County War Memorial Coliseum	Recap

Fort Wayne won series 3–2

== Conference finals ==
=== Eastern Conference ===
==== (2) Greenville Swamp Rabbits vs. (4) South Carolina Stingrays ====
June 16	Greenville Swamp Rabbits	1–5	South Carolina Stingrays	Carolina Ice Palace	Recap

June 18	South Carolina Stingrays	2–5	Greenville Swamp Rabbits	Bon Secours Wellness Arena	Recap

June 19	South Carolina Stingrays	3–2	Greenville Swamp Rabbits	Bon Secours Wellness Arena	Recap

June 21	Greenville Swamp Rabbits	1–2	South Carolina Stingrays	Carolina Ice Palace	Recap

South Carolina won series 3–1

=== Western Conference ===
==== (1) Allen Americans vs. (3) Fort Wayne Komets ====
June 18	Fort Wayne Komets	2–5	Allen Americans	Allen Event Center	Recap

June 19	Fort Wayne Komets	5–4	OT	Allen Americans	Allen Event Center	Recap

June 21	Allen Americans	3–4	Fort Wayne Komets	Allen County War Memorial Coliseum	Recap

June 22	Allen Americans	2–3	OT	Fort Wayne Komets	Allen County War Memorial Coliseum	Recap

Fort Wayne won series 3–1

== Kelly Cup finals ==
Note: Italics signify games to be played only if necessary.

=== (W3) Fort Wayne Komets vs. (E4) South Carolina Stingrays ===
June 25	Fort Wayne Komets	7–2	South Carolina Stingrays	Carolina Ice Palace	Recap

June 27	Fort Wayne Komets	2–4	South Carolina Stingrays	Carolina Ice Palace	Recap

June 30	South Carolina Stingrays	4–6	Fort Wayne Komets	Allen County War Memorial Coliseum	Recap

July 2	South Carolina Stingrays	1–2	Fort Wayne Komets	Allen County War Memorial Coliseum	Recap

Fort Wayne won series 3–1

== Statistical leaders ==
=== Skaters ===
These are the top ten skaters based on points.

Player	Team	GP	G	A	Pts	+/–	PIM
Anthony Nellis	Fort Wayne Komets	13	8	5	13	+3	8
Stephen Harper	Fort Wayne Komets	12	6	7	13	+3	0
Cole Ully	South Carolina Stingrays	13	4	8	12	+2	0
Matthew Weis	South Carolina Stingrays	13	3	9	12	−4	6
Brandon Hawkins	Fort Wayne Komets	13	6	5	11	+2	6
Alan Lyszczarczyk	Fort Wayne Komets	11	3	8	11	+6	0
Shawn Szydlowski	Fort Wayne Komets	9	2	9	11	+5	4
Dan Desalvo	South Carolina Stingrays	13	5	5	10	+1	6
A. J. Jenks	Fort Wayne Komets	13	4	6	10	+3	18
Max Novak	South Carolina Stingrays	13	4	6	10	0	6

GP = Games played; G = Goals; A = Assists; Pts = Points; +/– = Plus/minus; PIM = Penalty minutes

=== Goaltending ===
This is a combined table of the top five goaltenders based on goals against average and the top five goaltenders based on save percentage, with at least 240 minutes played as of June 30. The table is sorted by GAA, and the criteria for inclusion are bolded.

Player	Team	GP	W	L	OTL	SA	GA	GAA	SV%	SO	TOI
Ryan Bednard	Greenville Swamp Rabbits	5	2	3	0	154	11	**2.44**	**0.929**	1	271
C. J. Motte	Allen Americans	4	2	1	1	119	11	**2.74**	**0.908**	0	241
Evan Buitenhuis	Wichita Thunder	5	2	2	1	152	14	**2.79**	**0.908**	0	301
Dylan Ferguson	Fort Wayne Komets	13	8	4	0	399	37	**2.93**	**0.907**	1	757
Jake Hildebrand	Florida Everblades	5	2	2	1	131	15	**3.28**	**0.885**	0	274

GP = Games played; W = Wins; L = Losses; OTL = Overtime Losses; SA = Shots against; GA = Goals against; GAA = Goals against average; SV% = Save percentage; SO = Shutouts; TOI = Time on ice (in minutes)

== See also ==
- 2020–21 ECHL season
- List of ECHL seasons

Preceded by ~~2020 Kelly Cup playoffs~~ Cancelled	Kelly Cup Playoffs; 2021	Succeeded by 2022 Kelly Cup playoffs
