= Omaha Knights (IHL) =

- City: Omaha, Nebraska
- League: International Hockey League
- Operated: 1959–1963
- Home arena: Ak-Sar-Ben Arena
- Colors: Black and Red

Franchise history
- 1959–1963: Omaha Knights
- 1963–1970: Toledo Blades
- 1970–1974: Toledo Hornets
- 1974–1975: Lansing Lancers

The Omaha Knights was a minor professional ice hockey team in Omaha, Nebraska. The franchise was founded in 1959 and played for four seasons before relocating to Toledo, Ohio. The team was swiftly replaced by the identically named Omaha Knights of the Central Professional Hockey League.

Ken Wilson was the general manager from 1960 to 1963. Goaltender Glenn Ramsay won the James Norris Memorial Trophy for the fewest goals against during the 1961–62 and the 1962–63 regular seasons. The Rookie of the Year Trophy was awarded to Knights' player John Gravel in 1963.

== Season-by-season records ==
Season	GP	W	L	T	Pts	GF	GA	Place	Playoffs
1959–60	67	15	47	5	35	198	303	4th in West	Missed
1960–61	70	35	32	3	73	254	235	3rd in West	Lost round-robin semifinal
1961–62	68	37	28	3	77	264	227	4th	Lost semifinal
1962–63	70	30	35	5	65	252	248	4th	Lost semifinal
Totals	275	117	142	16	–	968	1213	–	–
