= Glenn Ramsay =

Canadian ice hockey player

- Born: January 20, 1935 (age 90); Sault Ste. Marie, Ontario, Canada
- Height: 6 ft 0 in (183 cm)
- Weight: 180 lb (82 kg; 12 st 12 lb)
- Position: Goaltender
- Caught: Left
- Played for: Cincinnati Mohawks; Fort Wayne Komets; Troy Bruins; Toledo Mercurys; St. Paul Saints; Omaha Knights; Toledo Blades; Springfield Indians; Port Huron Flags
- Playing career: 1956–1974

Glenn Ramsay (born January 20, 1935, in Sault Ste. Marie, Ontario) is a former professional ice hockey goaltender who played 19 seasons in the IHL (1956–74). Ramsay is a six-time winner of the James Norris Memorial Trophy, which was awarded by the IHL to the goaltender with the fewest goals allowed during the regular season.

Ramsay played 945 regular season games and 63 playoff games in the IHL. He also played 9 games in the AHL with the Springfield Indians during the 1965–66 AHL season.
