= Sudbury Wolves (disambiguation) =

Sudbury Wolves could mean:

- Sudbury Wolves, a team in the Ontario Hockey League
- Sudbury Jr. Wolves, a team in the Northern Ontario Junior Hockey League
- Sudbury Wolves (EPHL), a defunct team in the Eastern Professional Hockey League
