= Guy Dupuis =

Canadian ice hockey player (born 1970)

- Born: May 10, 1970 (age 56) Moncton, New Brunswick, Canada
- Height: 6 ft 2 in (188 cm)
- Weight: 200 lb (91 kg; 14 st 4 lb)
- Position: Defense
- Shot: Right
- Played for: Adirondack Red Wings; Bakersfield Condors; Chicago Wolves; Hershey Bears; Fort Wayne Komets; Iserlohn Roosters; Michigan K-Wings
- NHL draft: 47th overall, 1988; Detroit Red Wings
- Playing career: 1990–2011

Guy Dupuis (born May 10, 1970) is a Canadian former professional ice hockey defenseman. He is known for playing fourteen seasons with the Fort Wayne Komets of the Central Hockey League. Dupuis was the last active member of the Komets' 1993 Turner Cup-winning team.

== Career ==
Dupuis was drafted by the Detroit Red Wings in the 1988 NHL entry draft, going 47th overall. While he never played for Detroit, he did play parts of three seasons with their AHL affiliate in Adirondack.

Dupuis skated with the Fort Wayne Komets from part of the 1991-92 IHL season until the end of the 1998-99 season. He was a member of the team during the 1992-93 season when the Komets won the Turner Cup, which is awarded to the playoff champions of the IHL.

From 1999 until 2005, Dupuis played for seven teams in six different leagues. He returned to the Komets at the start of the 2005–06 and was named the UHL's (and later IHL) Best Defenseman in 2006-07, 2007–08, and 2008–09. He also helped lead the Komets to three consecutive Turner Cup titles (2007–08, 2008–09, 2009–10), making him one of fifteen players in IHL history to win four Turner Cups in their career. Dupuis signed a one-year extension on July 27, 2010, making it his 21st year of professional hockey.

== Retirement ==
Dupuis announced his retirement on May 24, 2011, two weeks after his 41st birthday. Dupuis is the only member of the Komets to play in all four leagues the team has participated in—the original International Hockey League, the United Hockey League, the second International Hockey League and the Central Hockey League. His final jersey was auctioned by the team and sold for $2750. This was the second consecutive year that Dupuis' jersey had the highest bid placed.

The Fort Wayne Komets immediately announced that his #2 would be retired during the 2nd home game of the 2011-12 season.

== Personal life ==
Dupuis is now employed at SCI in Fort Wayne, Indiana.

== Records ==
=== Fort Wayne Komets ===
- Games Played, Regular Season (945)
- Games Played, Playoffs (95)
- Games Played, Combined (1040)
- Goals by a defenseman (126)
- Goals by a defenseman in playoffs (14)
- Goals by a defenseman, Combined (140)
- Assists by a defenseman, Regular Season (417)
- Assists by a defenseman, Combined (454)
- Points by a defenseman, Regular Season (543)
- Points by a defenseman, Combined (594)

== Awards ==
- 1987-88, President's Cup winner, QMJHL
- 1992-93, Turner Cup winner, IHL
- 2004-05, First All-Star Team, ECHL
- 2005-06, Second All-Star Team, UHL
- 2006-07, Best Defenseman, UHL
- 2007-08, Best Defenseman, IHL
- 2007-08, Turner Cup winner, IHL
- 2008-09, Best Defenseman, IHL
- 2008-09, Turner Cup winner, IHL
- 2009-10, Turner Cup winner, IHL
- Eight time winner, Best Defenseman, Fort Wayne Komets
- Seven time winner, Plus-Minus Award, Fort Wayne Komets
- Two time winner, Bud Gallmeier Memorial Trophy for Community Service in Fort Wayne
- Two time winner, Komets' True Komet Award
