= 1959–60 IHL season =

North American ice hockey season

The 1959–60 IHL season was the 15th season of the International Hockey League, a North American minor professional league. Eight teams participated in the regular season, and the St. Paul Saints won the Turner Cup.

== Regular season ==
Eastern Division	GP	W	L	T	GF	GA	Pts
Fort Wayne Komets	68	50	16	2	312	187	102
Louisville Rebels	68	37	30	1	303	276	75
Toledo-St. Louis Mercurys	68	28	36	4	266	298	60
Indianapolis Chiefs	68	25	40	3	234	322	53

Western Division	GP	W	L	T	GF	GA	Pts
St. Paul Saints	68	41	21	6	261	188	88
Denver Mavericks/Minneapolis Millers	68	39	27	2	297	233	80
Milwaukee Falcons	67	24	42	1	251	314	49
Omaha Knights	67	15	47	5	198	303	35

== Turner Cup-Playoffs ==
Turner Cup-Semifinals
E1	Fort Wayne Komets	4
E2	Louisville Rebels	2
W1	St. Paul Saints	4
W2	Minneapolis Millers	1

Turner Cup-Final
E1	Fort Wayne Komets	3
W1	St. Paul Saints	4
