= James Norris Memorial Trophy (IHL) =

The James Norris Memorial Trophy was awarded annually by the International Hockey League to the goaltender(s), with the fewest goals allowed during the regular season. The trophy is named for James E. Norris, former owner of the Detroit Red Wings, in honor of his contributions to the IHL in its early years.

== Winners ==
Season	Winner(s)	Team
1955–56	Bill Tibbs	Troy Bruins
1956–57	Glenn Ramsay	Cincinnati Mohawks
1957–58	Glenn Ramsay	Cincinnati Mohawks
1958–59	Don Rigazio	Louisville Rebels
1959–60	Reno Zanier	Fort Wayne Komets
1960–61	Ray Mikulan	Minneapolis Millers
1961–62	Glenn Ramsay	Omaha Knights
1962–63	Glenn Ramsay	Omaha Knights
1963–64	Glenn Ramsay	Toledo Blades
1964–65	Chuck Adamson	Fort Wayne Komets
1965–66	Bob Sneddon	Port Huron Flags
1966–67	Glenn Ramsay	Toledo Blades
1967–68	Bob Perani, Tim Tabor	Muskegon Mohawks
1968–69	John Adams, Pat Rupp	Dayton Gems
1969–70	Gaye Cooley, Bob Perreault	Des Moines Oak Leafs
1970–71	Lyle Carter	Muskegon Mohawks
1971–72	Glenn "Chico" Resch	Muskegon Mohawks
1972–73	Robbie Irons, Don Atchison	Fort Wayne Komets
1973–74	Bill Hughes	Muskegon Mohawks
1974–75	Merlin Jenner, Bob Volpe	Flint Generals
1975–76	Don Cutts	Muskegon Mohawks
1976–77	Terry Richardson	Kalamazoo Wings
1977–78	Pierre Chagnon, Lorne Molleken	Saginaw Gears
1978–79	Gordie Laxton	Grand Rapids Owls
1979–80	Larry Lozinski	Kalamazoo Wings
1980–81	Claude Legris, Georges Gagnon	Kalamazoo Wings
1981–82	Dave Tardich, Lorne Molleken	Toledo Goaldiggers
1982–83	Lorne Molleken	Toledo Goaldiggers
1983–84	Darren Jensen	Fort Wayne Komets
1984–85	Rick Heinz	Peoria Rivermen
1985–86	Eldon "Pokey" Reddick, Rick St. Croix	Fort Wayne Komets
1986–87	Michel Dufour, Alain Raymond	Fort Wayne Komets
1987–88	Steve Guenette	Muskegon Lumberjacks
1988–89	Rick Knickle	Fort Wayne Komets
1989–90	Jimmy Waite	Indianapolis Ice
1990–91	Pat Jablonski, Guy Hebert	Peoria Rivermen
1991–92	Wade Flaherty, Arturs Irbe	Kansas City Blades
1992–93	Rick Knickle, Clint Malarchuk	San Diego Gulls
1993–94	Jean-Claude Bergeron, Mike Greenlay	Atlanta Knights
1994–95	Tommy Salo	Denver Grizzlies
1995–96	Tommy Salo, Mark McArthur	Utah Grizzlies
1996–97	Rich Parent, Jeff Reese	Detroit Vipers
1997–98	Kay Whitmore, Mike Buzak	Long Beach Ice Dogs
1998–99	Andrei Trefilov, Kevin Weekes	Detroit Vipers
1999–00	Frederic Chabot	Houston Aeros
2000–01	Norm Maracle, Scott Fankhouser	Orlando Solar Bears
