= 1960–61 IHL season =

North American ice hockey season

The 1960–61 IHL season was the 16th season of the International Hockey League, a North American minor professional league. Eight teams participated in the regular season, and the St. Paul Saints won the Turner Cup.

== Regular season ==
Eastern Division	GP	W	L	T	GF	GA	Pts
Toledo Mercurys	70	36	33	1	274	260	71
Fort Wayne Komets	69	31	35	3	304	265	65
Muskegon Zephyrs	70	25	41	4	243	319	54
Indianapolis Chiefs	70	20	46	4	217	313	44

Western Division	GP	W	L	T	GF	GA	Pts
Minneapolis Millers	72	50	20	2	323	229	102
St. Paul Saints	72	46	22	4	309	233	96
Omaha Knights	70	35	32	3	254	235	73
Milwaukee Falcons	17	1	15	1	45	115	3

== Turner Cup-Playoffs ==
Eastern Division	GP	W	L	T	GF	GA	Pts
Muskegon Zephyrs	8	4	2	2	30	29	10
Fort Wayne Komets	8	3	3	2	27	26	8
Toledo Mercurys	8	3	5	0	30	32	6

Western Division	GP	W	L	T	GF	GA	Pts
St. Paul Saints	8	6	1	1	31	15	13
Minneapolis Millers	8	3	3	2	28	22	8
Omaha Knights	8	1	6	1	20	42	3

Turner-Cup-Semifinals
W1	St. Paul Saints
E1	Muskegon Zephyrs

Turner-Cup-Final
W1	St. Paul Saints	4
E1	Muskegon Zephyrs	1
