= Milwaukee Falcons =

Minor league ice hockey team

The Milwaukee Falcons were a minor league professional ice hockey team, based in Milwaukee, Wisconsin, that played in the International Hockey League from 1959 to 1960. Milwaukee placed third in the west division during their only complete season. The Falcons played 17 games into the 1960–61 season, folding on November 26, 1960.

== Season-by-season results ==
Season	Games	Won	Lost	Tied	Points	Winning %	Goals for	Goals against	Standing
1959–60	67	24	42	1	49	0.366	251	314	3rd, West
1960–61	17	1	15	1	3	0.088	45	115	Incomplete
