= 1961–62 IHL season =

North American ice hockey season

The 1961–62 IHL season was the 17th season of the International Hockey League, a North American minor professional league. Seven teams participated in the regular season, and the Muskegon Zephyrs won the Turner Cup.

== Regular season ==
| | GP | W | L | T | GF | GA | Pts |
|---|---|---|---|---|---|---|---|
| Muskegon Zephyrs | 68 | 43 | 23 | 2 | 334 | 242 | 88 |
| St. Paul Saints | 68 | 42 | 25 | 1 | 291 | 209 | 85 |
| Minneapolis Millers | 68 | 41 | 26 | 1 | 261 | 234 | 83 |
| Omaha Knights | 68 | 37 | 28 | 3 | 264 | 227 | 77 |
| Fort Wayne Komets | 68 | 33 | 31 | 4 | 265 | 245 | 70 |
| Indianapolis Chiefs | 67 | 19 | 48 | 0 | 220 | 348 | 38 |
| Toledo Mercurys | 68 | 17 | 50 | 1 | 222 | 352 | 35 |

== Turner Cup-Playoffs ==
Turner Cup-Semifinals
1 | Muskegon Zephyrs | 4
3 | Minneapolis Millers | 1
2 | St. Paul Saints | 4
4 | Omaha Knights | 3

Turner Cup-Final
1 | Muskegon Zephyrs | 4
2 | St. Paul Saints | 0
