= 1962–63 IHL season =

North American ice hockey season

The 1962–63 IHL season was the 18th season of the International Hockey League, a North American minor professional league. Six teams participated in the regular season, and the Fort Wayne Komets won the Turner Cup. This season was also noteworthy as the league played a partially-interlocking schedule with the Eastern Professional Hockey League (1959–1963).

== Regular season ==
	GP	W	L	T	GF	GA	Pts
Fort Wayne Komets	70	35	30	5	283	255	75
Minneapolis Millers	70	36	32	2	296	301	74
Muskegon Zephyrs	70	34	31	5	328	326	73
Omaha Knights	70	30	35	5	252	248	65
Port Huron Flags	70	28	36	6	246	273	62
St. Paul Saints	70	23	44	3	241	328	49

== Turner Cup-Playoffs ==
Turner Cup-Semifinals
1	Fort Wayne Komets	4
3	Muskegon Zephyrs	2
2	Minneapolis Millers	4
4	Omaha Knights	3

Turner Cup-Final
1	Fort Wayne Komets	4
2	Minneapolis Millers	1
