= Corteva Coliseum =

Indoor arena in Indianapolis, Indiana, US

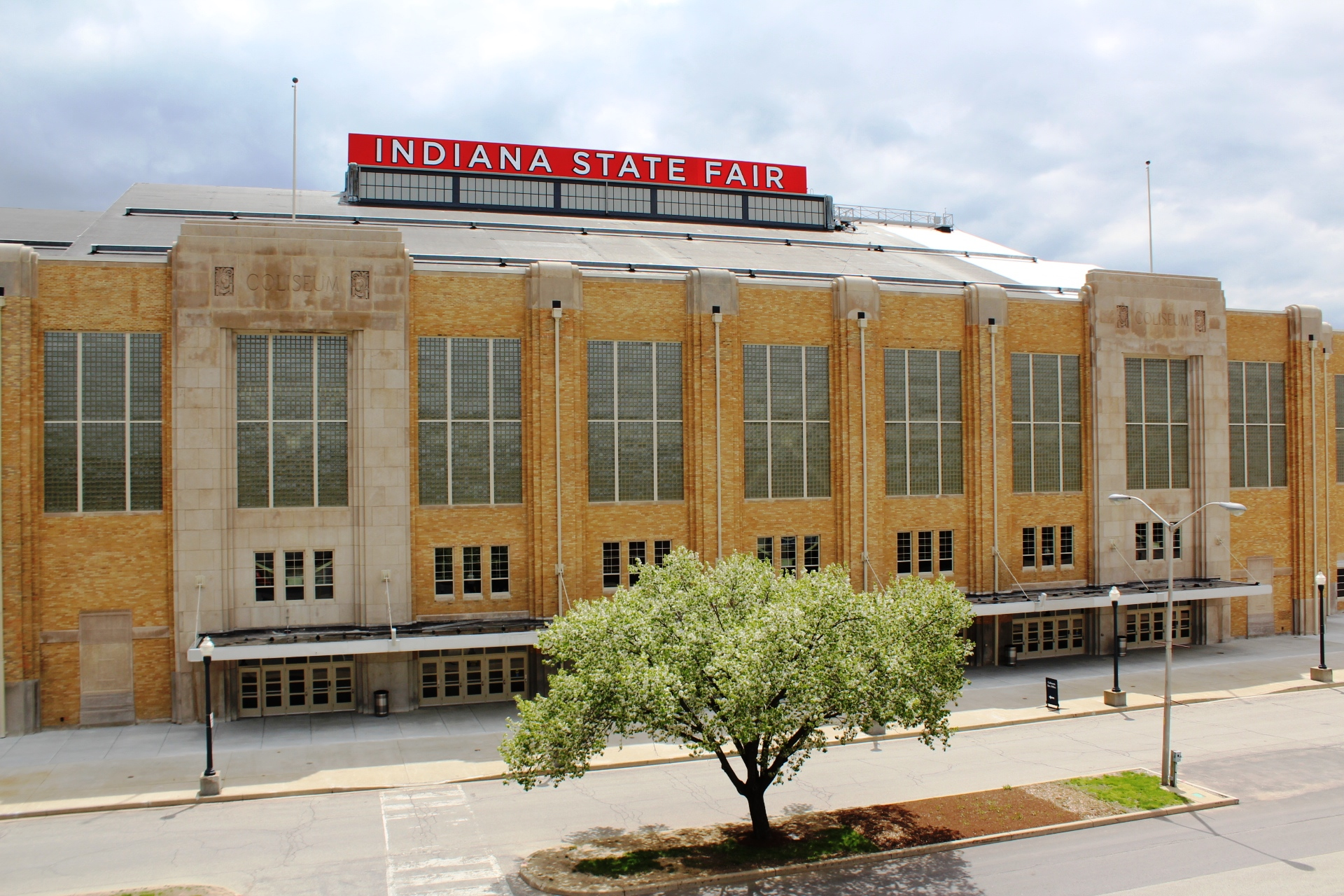
- Corteva Coliseum in 2014

- Location within Indiana Location within the United States
- Interactive map of Corteva Coliseum
- Former names: Livestock Pavilion (1907–1938); Indiana State Fairgrounds Coliseum (1939–1991); Pepsi Coliseum (1991–2012); Fairgrounds Coliseum (2012–2014); Indiana Farmers Coliseum (2014–2024)
- Address: 1202 East 38th Street
- Location: Indianapolis, Indiana, U.S.
- Coordinates: 39°49′39″N 86°8′6″W
- Owner: State of Indiana
- Operator: Indiana State Fair Commission
- Capacity: Basketball: 6,800; Hockey: 6,200

Construction
- Groundbreaking: 1936
- Opened: August 1939
- Renovated: 2014
- Closed: October 29, 2012 – April 23, 2014
- Reopened: April 24, 2014
- Cost: $53 million (renovation)
- Architects: Merritt Harrison (original); Browning Day & Populous (renovation)
- Project manager: Hunt Construction Group

Tenants
- Basketball Indiana Pacers (ABA) (1967–1974); IU Indy Jaguars (NCAA) (2014–present); Indiana Fever (WNBA) (2021) Ice hockey Indianapolis Capitals (AHL) (1939–1952); Indianapolis Chiefs (IHL) (1955–1962); Indianapolis Capitols (CPHL) (1963); Indianapolis Checkers (CHL/IHL) (1981–1985); Indianapolis Ice (IHL/CHL) (1988–1993, 1999–2004); Indiana Ice (USHL) (2004–2012); Indy Fuel (ECHL) (2014–2024) Other Naptown Roller Derby (WFTDA) (2010–present)

Website
- Venue Website

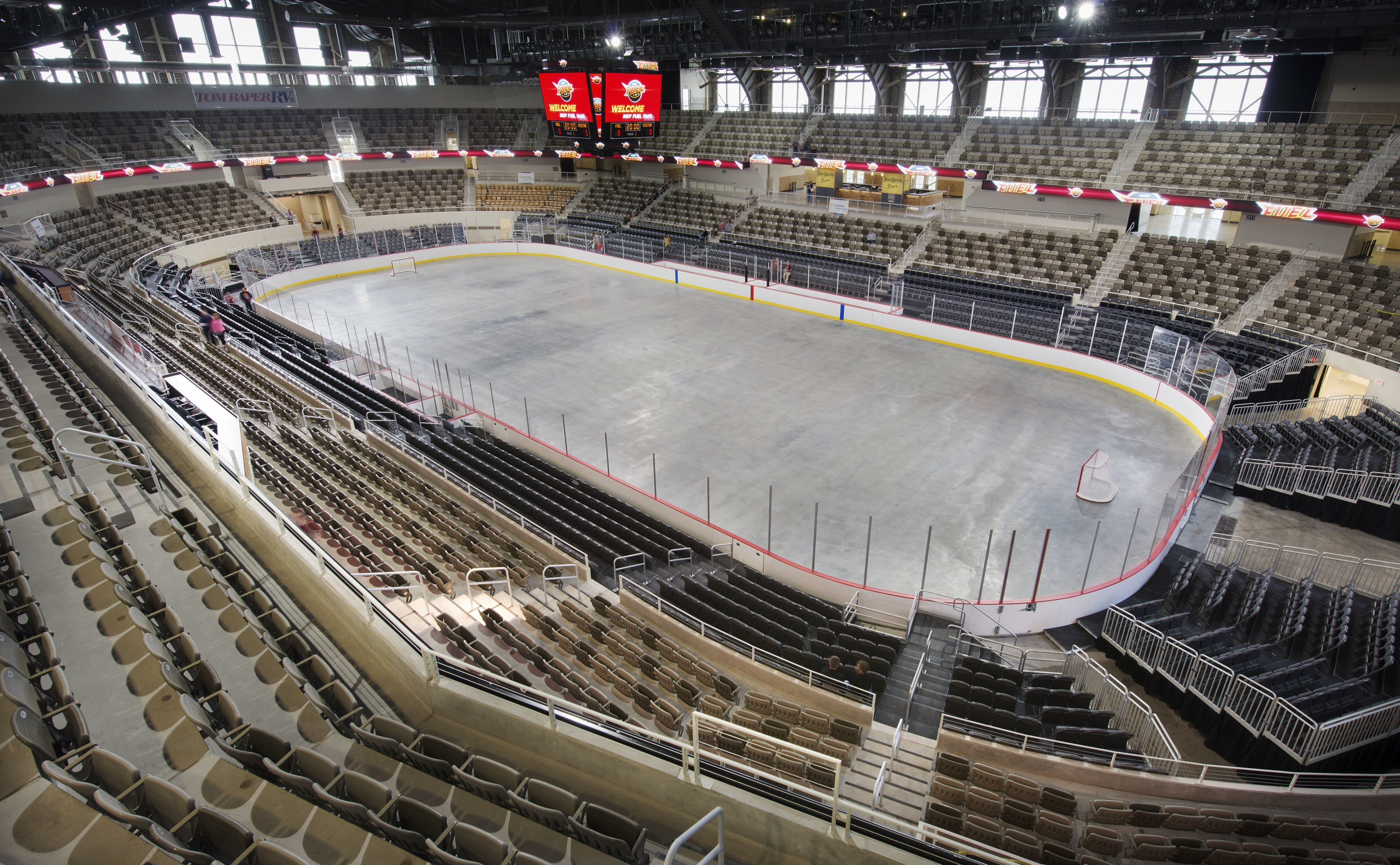
The interior of Fairgrounds Coliseum after the most recent renovation

The Corteva Coliseum is a 6,500-seat indoor multi-use arena, located on the Indiana State Fairgrounds in Indianapolis. It was originally called the Indiana State Fairgrounds Coliseum and later the Pepsi Coliseum, Fairgrounds Coliseum, and Indiana Farmers Coliseum.

== History ==
Originally opened in 1939 as part of President Franklin D. Roosevelt's Works Progress Administration (part of the New Deal), the Coliseum has hosted numerous historical events, including the only performances ever held in Indiana by The Beatles, in 1964.

=== 1963 gas explosion ===
Plaque honoring explosion victims 2014

On October 31, 1963, during a Holiday on Ice show, a liquefied petroleum gas leak at a concession stand caused an explosion which killed 81 people and injured around 400 others. A memorial plaque was dedicated 40 years later in the building, but it has since been removed. Another plaque honoring the explosion victims currently hangs inside the building's lobby.

=== Subsequent history ===
After Market Square Arena opened in 1974, the coliseum continued on as an alternate venue to the larger arena for events requiring less seating or overall space. This continues today after the Gainbridge Fieldhouse opened in 1999, and the subsequent demolition of Market Square Arena in 2001.

On October 26, 2012, the Coliseum held a "Lights Out" ceremony and closed for renovations. On April 24, 2014, after a 17-month, $53 million renovation, the Coliseum re-opened.

In December 2014, the Indiana Farmers Mutual Insurance Company entered into a ten-year agreement with the Indiana State Fair Commission to re-christen the arena as the Indiana Farmers Coliseum.

In November 2024, the Indiana State Fairgrounds Commission and Indianapolis-based Corteva Agriscience entered into an agreement to rename the Coliseum as Corteva Coliseum.

== Indiana Pacers (1967–74) ==
The venue was home to the Indiana Pacers of the American Basketball Association (ABA) from 1967 to 1974. The Pacers were very successful in their tenure at the Coliseum, winning three ABA Championships. They captured the ABA titles in 1969–70, defeating the Los Angeles Stars in 6 games, in 1971–72, defeating the New York Nets in 6 games, and in the 1972–73 season, defeating the Kentucky Colonels in 7 games. The team moved to Market Square Arena in 1974. In 1976, the Pacers became a franchise in the National Basketball Association (NBA) when the ABA merged with the NBA.

The Pacers returned for a night when they played their first pre-season game of the 2008–09 season at the Pepsi Coliseum on October 8, 2008, hosting the then-New Orleans Hornets. 7,439 people watched the Pacers lose to the Hornets 105–71. The Pacers wore uniforms based on the 1967 to 1971 uniform design. Former ABA Pacers George McGinnis, Darnell Hillman, Bob Netolicky, Don Buse, Jerry Harkness, Steve Green, Tom Thacker, Bill Newton, and Wayne Pack, attended the game and were recognized during a halftime ceremony. During the game's first quarter, former Championship Pacers coach and current radio commentator Slick Leonard sat on the Pacers' bench as head coach, while then-head coach Jim O'Brien joined Mark Boyle for the radio broadcast.

== Ice hockey ==
The Indianapolis Capitals of the American Hockey League played at the Coliseum from 1939 to 1952, winning the Calder Cup in 1942 and 1950. The Indianapolis Chiefs of the International Hockey League played at the Coliseum from 1955 to 1962, winning the Turner Cup in 1958. The Indianapolis Checkers of the Central Hockey League played at the Coliseum from 1981 to 1985, winning back-to-back Adams Cup Championships in 1982 and 1983. The Indianapolis Ice of the IHL and Central Hockey League played at the Coliseum from 1988 to 1993 and again from 1999 to 2004, winning the 1990 Turner Cup and 2000 Ray Miron President's Cup Championship.

The Indiana Ice of the United States Hockey League played at the Coliseum from 2004 to 2012, leaving due to the renovation. The Ice won the USHL's Clark Cup in 2009 while playing in the building. They did not return to the Coliseum upon the venue reopening, opting for withdrawal from competition or dormancy until another venue could be secured. From 2014 to 2024, the Indy Fuel ECHL hockey team played in the arena. The 2023–2024 season was the last for the Fuel at the Coliseum before they left for the Fishers Event Center in suburban Fishers.

The Coliseum hosted the American Hockey League's Calder Cup Final in 1942, 1943 and 1950; the International Hockey League's Turner Cup Final in 1957, 1958 and 1990; the Central Hockey League's Adams Cup Final in 1982, 1983 and 1984, and Ray Miron President's Cup Final in 2000; and the United States Hockey League's Clark Cup Final in 2009. Eight of Indianapolis' nine hockey championship teams called the Coliseum home.

== Other sports teams and events ==
The finals of the 1942–43 – 1944–45 Indiana High School Boys Basketball Tournaments were held at the Coliseum.

On January 25, 2019, the Horizon League announced its Men's and Women's Basketball Championships would take place at the Coliseum, starting March 9–10, 2020.

The Coliseum also hosts Budweiser Fight Night Boxing; the Indianapolis Boat, Sport & Travel Show; the Hoosier Horse Fair; high school and college commencement ceremonies; and many concerts featuring national acts. On April 27, 2016, Donald Trump held a rally for his presidential campaign in the Coliseum.

During the winter months, public ice skating is offered at the Coliseum.

With the NCAA electing to hold the entirety of the 2021 Division I men's basketball tournament within the state of Indiana to prevent the spread of COVID-19, the Coliseum served as one of the sites hosting first and second-round games.

On April 13, 2021, the Indiana Fever announced that they would play the last 12 home games of the 2021 WNBA season at the Coliseum due to the renovations at Gainbridge Fieldhouse.

On November 10, 2021, professional wrestling promotion All Elite Wrestling hosted an episode of their weekly television show AEW Dynamite from the arena.

On November 30, 2022, All Elite Wrestling had another one of their shows (AEW Dynamite).

== See also ==
- List of indoor arenas in the United States
- List of music venues in the United States
- List of NCAA Division I basketball arenas
- List of American Basketball Association arenas
- List of attractions and events in Indianapolis

Preceded by none	Home of the Indiana Pacers; 1967–1974	Succeeded by Market Square Arena
Preceded by IUPUI Gymnasium	Home of the IUPUI/IU Indy Jaguars; 2014–present	Succeeded by Current
Preceded by Gainbridge Fieldhouse	Home of the Indiana Fever; 2021–2022	Succeeded by Hinkle Fieldhouse
Preceded by none	Home of the Indianapolis Capitals; 1939–1952	Succeeded by none
Preceded by none	Home of the Indianapolis Chiefs; 1955–1962	Succeeded by none
Preceded by none	Home of the Indianapolis Capitols; 1963	Succeeded by Cincinnati Gardens
Preceded by Market Square Arena	Home of the Indianapolis Checkers; 1979–1985	Succeeded by Market Square Arena
Preceded by Market Square Arena (1994–1997)	Home of the Indianapolis Ice; 1988–1994, 1997–1999	Succeeded by Market Square Arena
Preceded by David S. Palmer Arena (Danville, IL); Danville Wings	Home of the Indiana Ice; 2004–2012	Succeeded by Bankers Life Fieldhouse
Preceded by	Home of the Indy Fuel; 2014–2024	Succeeded by Fishers Event Center
Preceded by Indiana Convention Center (2009)	Home of the Naptown Roller Derby; 2006–2008, 2010–present	Succeeded by Current
