= Louisville Rebels =

The Louisville Rebels were a minor league professional ice hockey team that played in the International Hockey League from 1957 to 1960. The Rebels were based in Louisville, Kentucky and originally played at the Louisville Gardens, and later the Freedom Hall. The team was previously known as the Huntington Hornets in 1956–57, and had relocated from Huntington, West Virginia.

In their first season, the Rebels placed third in the regular season, and defeated the first place Cincinnati Mohawks in the first round of the playoffs three games to two. The Mohawks were the defending champions, and had won the league playoffs the last five consecutive seasons. The Rebels moved on to the finals, a series they led versus the Indianapolis Chiefs three games to two, but eventually lost in seven games. In 1958–59, the Rebels finished first in the regular season, winning the Fred A. Huber Trophy, and won their first Turner Cup, defeating the Fort Wayne Komets in six games in the championship finals.

Louisville finished second in the east division during the 1959–60 season, but were eliminated in the first round of the playoffs. The Rebels disbanded after the season.

== Season-by-season results ==
Season	Games	Won	Lost	Tied	Points	Winning %	Goals for	Goals against	Standing
1957–58	64	30	31	3	63	0.492	239	263	3rd, IHL
1958–59	60	35	24	1	71	0.592	280	197	1st, IHL
1959–60	68	37	30	1	75	0.551	303	276	2nd, East

== See also ==
- Sports in Louisville, Kentucky
