= Fort Wayne Komets =

Professional minor league ice hockey team in Fort Wayne, Indiana

- City: Fort Wayne, Indiana
- League: ECHL (since 2012)
- Conference: Western
- Division: Central
- Home arena: Allen County War Memorial Coliseum
- Colors: Orange, black, white
- Owner: The Franke Family
- Head coach: Ben Boudreau
- Media: 96.3XKE (96.3 FM) (WXKE)
- Affiliates: Edmonton Oilers (NHL); Bakersfield Condors (AHL)
- Website: komets.com

Franchise history
- First IHL Franchise
- 1952–1990: Fort Wayne Komets
- 1990–1991: Albany Choppers
- Current ECHL Franchise
- 1985–1990: Flint Spirits
- 1990–present: Fort Wayne Komets

Championships
- Regular season titles: 12 (1959–60, 1962–63, 1972–73, 1977–78, 1983–84, 1985–86, 1986–87, 2002–03, 2003–04, 2006–07, 2007–08, 2008–09)
- Division titles: 2 (2016, 2026)
- Conference titles: 2 (2012, 2021)
- Turner Cups: 7 (1963, 1965, 1973, 1993, 2008, 2009, 2010)
- Ray Miron President's Cup: 1 (2012)
- Colonial Cups: 1 (2003)
- Kelly Cups: 1 (2021)

The Fort Wayne Komets are a minor league ice hockey team, which currently plays in the ECHL. They play their home games at the Allen County War Memorial Coliseum in Fort Wayne, Indiana. In all of North American professional hockey, only the Original Six teams of the NHL and the Hershey Bears of the AHL have played continuously in the same city with the same name longer than the Komets.

== History ==
There have been two different hockey teams known as the Fort Wayne Komets. The original Komets franchise was founded in 1952 in the International Hockey League. In 1990, they moved to Albany, New York and became the Albany Choppers. They only played part of one season in Albany before folding on February 15, 1991.

The second team was founded in 1985 in Flint, Michigan where they were known as the Flint Spirits. In 1990, only two days after the first Komets team left Fort Wayne, the Franke family of Fort Wayne bought the Flint Spirits, moved them to Fort Wayne, and took the Komets name and history. From 1985 to 1999, they also played in the IHL, then in 1999, they moved to the United Hockey League (UHL). In 2007, the UHL changed its name to the International Hockey League, which became available when the previous IHL ceased operations in 2001. In 2010, that league also ceased operations, and the Komets joined the Central Hockey League (CHL) along with the surviving members of their former league. In 2012, they left the CHL for their current league, the ECHL.

== Affiliations ==
For the 2014–15 season, the Komets entered into a one-year affiliation with the Colorado Avalanche of the NHL, providing a direct line to Colorado's American Hockey League affiliate, the Lake Erie Monsters. After a successful season and partnership proving beneficial to all parties, on July 21, 2015, the Komets announced a continuance of the affiliation with the Avalanche and new AHL affiliate, the San Antonio Rampage on a two-year deal through the 2015–16 and 2016–17 seasons. However, the Avalanche and Komets mutually agreed to end the affiliation one season early in 2016. After a season operating independently of an affiliation, the Komets agreed to a one-year affiliation deal with the Arizona Coyotes and their AHL affiliate, the Tucson Roadrunners, but did not extend the affiliation after the deal ended.

On August 21, 2018, the Komets announced a new one-year affiliation agreement with the NHL's Vegas Golden Knights and AHL affiliate Chicago Wolves. The affiliation was later extended for the 2019–20 season. The affiliation with the Golden Knights ended on May 19, 2022.

On July 27, 2022, the Komets announced a new affiliation agreement with the NHL's Edmonton Oilers and their AHL affiliate, the Bakersfield Condors.

On May 28, 2024, the Komets and Edmonton Oilers extended their affiliation agreement for the 2024–25 season.

== Season-by-season results ==
This is a partial list of the last ten seasons completed by the Fort Wayne Komets. For the full season-by-season history, see List of Fort Wayne Komets seasons

Regular season											Playoffs				
Season	GP	W	L	OTL	SOL	Pts	GF	GA	PIM	Standing	Year	1st round	2nd round	3rd round	Kelly Cup
2016–17	72	45	19	6	2	98	264	210	1292	2nd, Central	2017	W, 4–1, QC	L, 1–4, TOL	—	—
2017–18	72	46	20	5	1	98	290	216	1078	2nd, Central	2018	W, 4–1, CIN	W, 4–2, TOL	L, 3–4, COL	—
2018–19	76	36	26	4	6	82	233	248	1132	3rd, Central	2019	L, 2–4, TOL	—	—	—
2019–20	62	31	23	6	2	70	218	220	1044	3rd, Central	2020	Season cancelled due to COVID-19 pandemic			
2020–21	51	29	17	3	2	63	170	136	925	3rd, West Conf.	2021	—	W, 3–2, WIC	W, 3–1, ALN	W, 3–1, SC
2021–22	72	40	25	6	1	87	267	225	1271	2nd, Central	2022	L, 3–4, WHL	—	—	—
2022–23	72	34	31	4	3	75	270	275	1450	4th, Central	2023	L, 3–4, CIN	—	—	—
2023–24	72	35	30	3	4	77	224	226	996	5th, Central	2024	Did not qualify			
2024–25	72	41	22	7	2	91	229	193	885	2nd, Central	2025	W, 4–3, IA	L, 2–4, TOL	—	—
2025–26	72	45	17	10	0	100	250	189	846	1st, Central	2026	W, 4–1, IND	W, 4–2, TOL	L, 2–4, KCM	—

Records as of the conclusion of the 2025–26 regular season.

== Players ==
=== Retired numbers ===
The Komets have honored over 40 personnel in three sections - Executive Builders, Team Personnel and Media - in the Komets Hall of Fame established in 1988. They have also retired numbers to honor 16 people over the course of their history.

Fort Wayne Komets retired numbers
No.	Player	Position	Tenure	Date of honor
1	Chuck Adamson	G	1962–1967	October 26, 2013
2	Guy Dupuis	D	1991–2011	October 29, 2011
5	Terry Pembroke	D	1964–1978	1988
6	Lionel Repka	D	1958–1969	1988
11	Len Thornson	C	1957–1969	1988
12	Reg Primeau	C	1960–1969	1988
16	Eddie Long	RW	1952–1966	1988
18	Rob Laird	LW	1974–1989	March 6, 2002
26	Colin Chin	C	1986–1996	November 17, 2007
30	Robbie Irons	G	1967–1981	1988
33	Nick Boucher	G	2007–2012	October 26, 2013
40	Bob Chase	Media	1953–2016	1993
58	Ken Ullyot	Owner	1958–1982	1988
59	Colin Lister	Owner	1959–1985	1988
77	Steven Fletcher	LW	1990–2002	November 17, 2007
91	Colin Chaulk	C	2002–2013	February 19, 2017
504 (Note: For his career wins as coach)	Al Sims	Coach	1989–93, 2007–13	March 25, 2017

=== Notable NHL alumni ===
List of Fort Wayne Komets alumni who played more than 100 games in the IHL and 100 or more games in the National Hockey League/World Hockey Association.

- Eric Boguniecki
- Bruce Boudreau
- Vyacheslav Butsayev
- Bob Fitchner
- Bernie MacNeil
- Rob Murphy
- Pokey Reddick
- Duane Rupp
- Vladimir Tsyplakov

List of Fort Wayne Komets alumni who played over 25 games in the ECHL and 25 or more games in the National Hockey League.

- Alex Belzile

== Franchise records ==
=== Scoring leaders ===
These are the top-ten point-scorers in franchise history. Figures are updated after each completed regular season.

Note: Pos = Position; GP = Games Played; G = Goals; A = Assists; Pts = Points; * = still active with the team

Player	Pos	GP	G	A	Pts
Len Thornson	C	763	412	807	1219
Eddie Long	RW	801	425	427	852
Colin Chaulk	C	581	187	497	684
Terry McDougall	C	507	249	395	644
Colin Chin	C	660	246	390	636
John Goodwin	LW	480	200	387	587
Guy Dupuis	D	945	126	417	543
Reg Primeau	C	452	200	342	542
Merv Dubchak	RW	437	321	218	539
Robbie Laird	LW	520	223	276	499

=== Regular season ===
- Most goals in a season: Merv Dubchak, 72 (1965–66)
- Most assists in a season: Len Thornson, 93 (1966–67)
- Most points in a season: Len Thornson, 139 (1966–67) & Terry McDougall, 139 (1978–79)
- Most penalty minutes in a season: Andy Bezeau, 590 (1995–96)
- Most wins in a season: Kevin St. Pierre, 43 (2003–04)
- Most shutouts in a season: Kevin Reiter, 7 (2007–08) & Kevin St. Pierre, 7 (2003–04)

=== Team records ===
- On March 28, 2008, the Komets set a new professional hockey record of 23 straight home wins. They defeated the Kalamazoo Wings 4–3. The record ended at 25.
- On April 12, 2008, the Komets set a new Fort Wayne hockey record of 56 wins in a season. The previous record of 53 was set in 2003–04.
- On May 15, 2010, the Komets defeated the Flint Generals in Game 5 of the IHL Turner Cup Finals to win the series, four games to one, earning the Komets a "three-peat" after winning the Turner Cup in 2008 and 2009 as well.

== See also ==
- History of sports in Fort Wayne, Indiana
