= Indianapolis Chiefs =

The Indianapolis Chiefs were a minor league professional ice hockey team that played in the International Hockey League from 1955 to 1962. The Chiefs were based in Indianapolis, Indiana and played at the Indiana State Fair Coliseum. In seven seasons, the Chiefs never had a regular season record with more wins than losses, but were finalists for the 1957 Turner Cup in a season dominated by the Cincinnati Mohawks. The Chiefs won the 1958 Turner Cup by defeating the Louisville Rebels in seven games.

== Season-by-season results ==
Season	Games	Won	Lost	Tied	Points	Winning %	Goals for	Goals against	Standing
1955–56	60	11	48	1	23	0.192	126	330	6th, IHL
1956–57	60	26	29	5	57	0.475	168	177	2nd, IHL
1957–58	64	28	30	6	62	0.484	209	208	4th, IHL
1958–59	60	26	30	4	56	0.467	231	247	4th, IHL
1959–60	68	25	40	3	53	0.390	234	322	4th, East
1960–61	70	20	46	4	44	0.314	217	313	4th, East
1961–62	68	19	49	0	38	0.284	220	348	6th, IHL
