= List of Chicago Wolves award winners =

Chicago Wolves awards
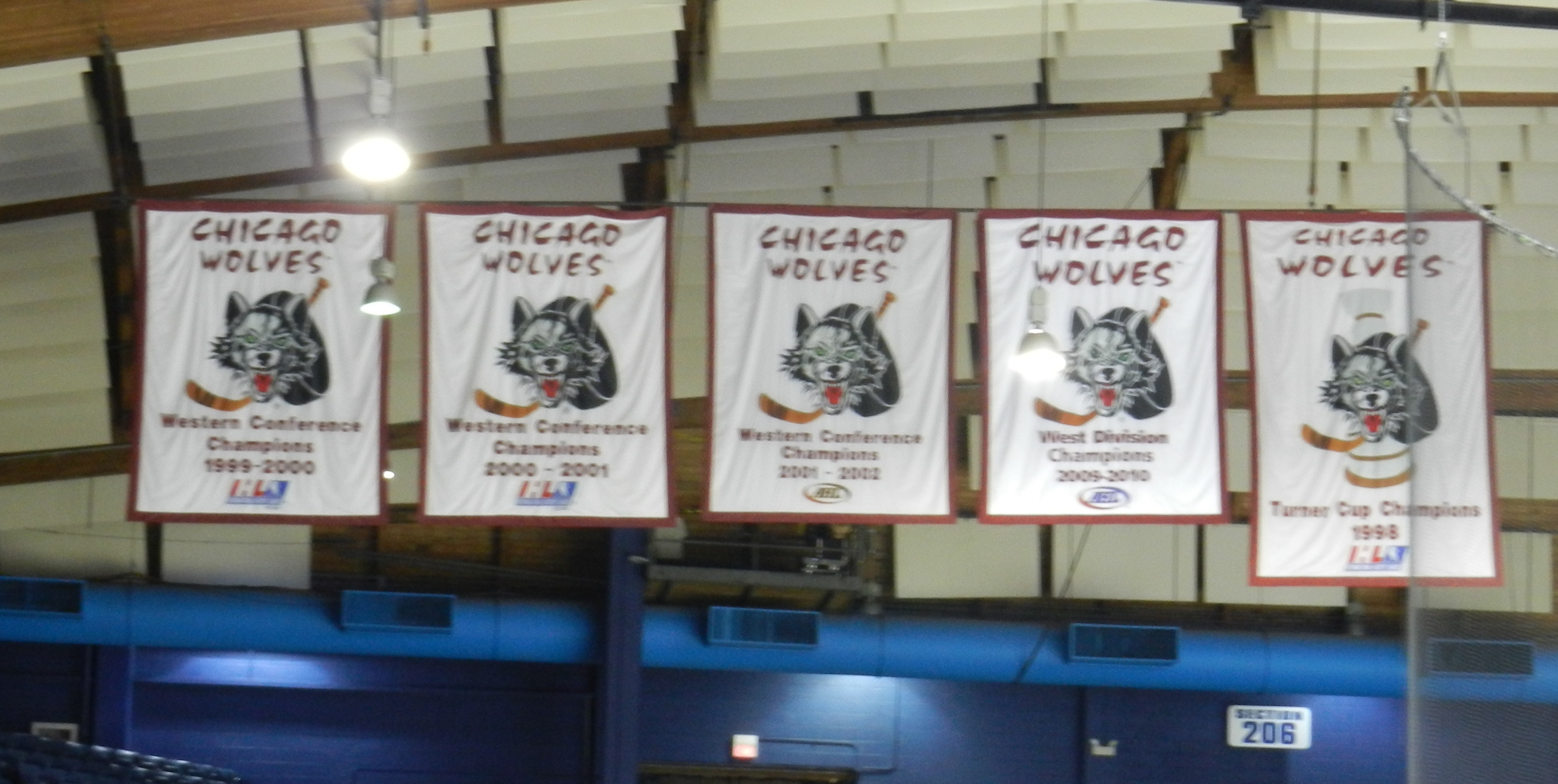
- Some of the Wolves' banners hanging in the Allstate Arena

Team trophies
- Award*: Wins
- Calder Cup: 3
- Turner Cup: 2
- Fred A. Huber Trophy: 1
- Robert W. Clarke Trophy: 3
- John D. Chick Trophy: 3
- Norman R. "Bud" Poile Trophy: 3
- President's Award: 1

Individual awards
- Award*: Wins
- Norman R. "Bud" Poile Trophy (IHL): 2
- Leo P. Lamoureux Memorial Trophy: 3
- John Cullen Award: 1
- Ironman Award: 1
- IHL Man of the Year: 3
- Les Cunningham Award: 2
- John B. Sollenberger Trophy: 3
- Willie Marshall Award: 2
- Dudley "Red" Garrett Memorial Award: 1
- Yanick Dupre Memorial Award: 1
- Jack A. Butterfield Trophy: 2

Total
- Awards won: 35

The Chicago Wolves are a professional ice hockey team playing in the American Hockey League (AHL). They are members of the Midwest division in the Western Conference. They were founded in 1994 as an expansion team in the International Hockey League (IHL). The Wolves joined the AHL in 2001 following the absorption of the IHL by the AHL.

The Wolves have won numerous awards in both leagues. The Wolves are four-time league champions having won two titles in both the AHL and the IHL. They were awarded the Fred A. Huber Trophy in the 1999–2000 season for having the best record in the IHL and have also received multiple trophies for winning their division. Individually, they have had four players lead their league in scoring a total of six times, with Steve Maltais accomplishing the feat in both leagues. Maltais is the most decorated individual in franchise history, winning three individual trophies along with being named a First Team All-Star three times and a Second Team All-Star three times.

Two players have had their numbers retired by the franchise. Wendell Young's number 1 was retired in 2001; five years later Maltais' number 11 was removed from circulation. The Wolves have also honored four other individuals with permanent banners hanging in the Allstate Arena. These are former players Tim Breslin and Dan Snyder, both of whom are deceased, as well as former head coach John Anderson and former general manager Kevin Cheveldayoff. Breslin and Snyder were further honored with the creation of team awards. The Tim Breslin Unsung Hero Award is awarded to the player "who best typifies Breslin's on-ice spirit and team-first attitude". The Dan Snyder Man of the Year Award is handed out to the Wolves' player who "demonstrates the most outstanding dedication to Chicago-area community service".

== League awards ==
=== Team trophies and awards ===
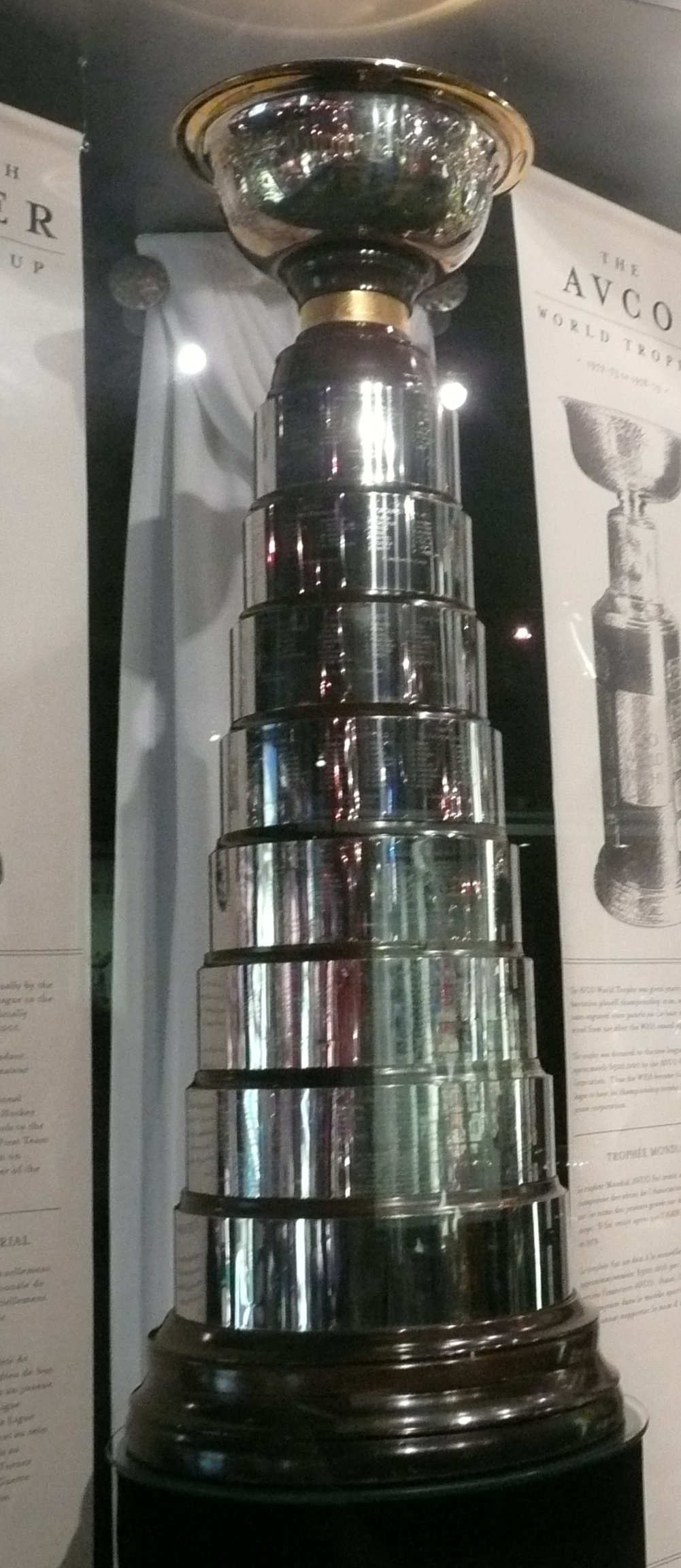
The Turner Cup, which the Wolves won on two occasions

The Wolves have won two championships in both the AHL and the IHL, first winning the Turner Cup as IHL champions during the 1997–98 and 1999–2000 seasons, then winning the Calder Cup in the 2001–02 and 2007–08 seasons. The 2001–02 championship coincided with the Wolves' inaugural AHL season. They were the sixth AHL team to win the championship in their first season.

Chicago received the 2009–10 President's Award, which recognizes an AHL organization for "excellence in all areas off the ice". Upon bestowing the award to the Wolves, the AHL called them a "forerunner in unique promotion and game-night experience" as well as "one of the league's model organizations in terms of community relations."

Award	Description	Season	Ref
Turner Cup	IHL Champion	1997–98	
Turner Cup	IHL Champion	1999–2000	
Calder Cup	AHL Champion	2001–02	
Calder Cup	AHL Champion	2007–08	
Calder Cup	AHL Champion	2021–22	
Fred A. Huber Trophy	Best record in the IHL for the regular season	1999–2000	
Robert W. Clarke Trophy	AHL playoff champion of the Western Conference^{a}	2001–02	
Robert W. Clarke Trophy	AHL playoff champion of the Western Conference^{a}	2004–05	
Robert W. Clarke Trophy	AHL playoff champion of the Western Conference^{a}	2007–08	
John D. Chick Trophy	AHL West Division champion^{b}	2004–05	
John D. Chick Trophy	AHL West Division champion^{b}	2007–08	
John D. Chick Trophy	AHL West Division champion^{b}	2009–10	
Norman R. "Bud" Poile Trophy	AHL Mid-West Division Champions^{c}	2007–08	
Norman R. "Bud" Poile Trophy	AHL Mid-West Division Champions^{c}	2011–12	
Norman R. "Bud" Poile Trophy	AHL Mid-West Division Champions^{c}	2013–14	
President's Award	Recognizes an AHL organization for excellence in all areas off the ice	2009–10	

a: Prior to 1998, the Robert W. Clarke Trophy was awarded to the champion of the Southern Conference/Division.
b: The John D. Chick Trophy was originally awarded to the Southern Division winner from 1974–95, and it has since been awarded to the winner of the Central (1996, 2002–03), Empire (1997–2000), Southern (2001) and West (2004–12) Divisions. Starting in 2012–13, the Chick Trophy goes to the regular-season champions of the South Division.
c: The Norman R. "Bud" Poile Trophy was previously awarded to winner of the West Division (2002–03), and regular season Western Conference champions (2004–11).

=== Individual awards ===
==== International Hockey League ====
While members of the IHL, the Wolves had two scoring champions on their team. Both Rob Brown and Steve Maltais led the league in points with Brown accomplishing the feat in 1995–96 and 1996–97; Maltais led the league in the 1999–2000 season. In the nine years the IHL Man of the Year was awarded, three Wolves players received the honors.

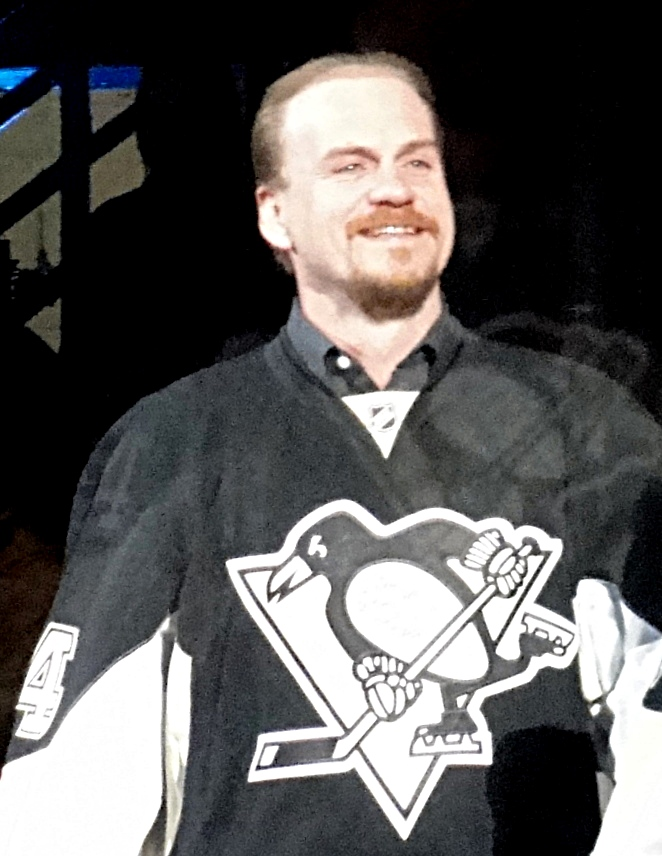
Rob Brown won multiple individual honors during the Wolves' time in the IHL

Award	Description	Name	Season	Ref
Norman R. "Bud" Poile Trophy (IHL)	Most Valuable Player in the Turner Cup playoffs	Alexander Semak	1997–98	
Norman R. "Bud" Poile Trophy (IHL)	Most Valuable Player in the Turner Cup playoffs	Andrei Trefilov	1999–2000	
Leo P. Lamoureux Memorial Trophy	League leader in points scored	Rob Brown	1995–96; 1996–97	
Leo P. Lamoureux Memorial Trophy	League leader in points scored	Steve Maltais	1999–2000	
John Cullen Award	Player deemed a key contributor to his team, while overcoming injury, illness, or other personal setbacks.	Steve Larouche	1999–2000	
Ironman Award	Player who played in all of his team's games and displayed outstanding offensive and defensive skills.	Steve Maltais	1999–2000	
IHL Man of the Year	Player who has distinguished himself through donation of time and other resources to charitable and educational efforts within his community.	Tim Breslin	1996–97	
IHL Man of the Year	Player who has distinguished himself through donation of time and other resources to charitable and educational efforts within his community.	Chris Marinucci	1998–99	
IHL Man of the Year	Player who has distinguished himself through donation of time and other resources to charitable and educational efforts within his community.	Wendell Young	2000–01	
IHL First All-Star Team	Top performers at each position over the course of the season	Steve Maltais (LW)	1994–95; 1998–99; 1999–2000	
IHL First All-Star Team	Top performers at each position over the course of the season	Rob Brown (RW)	1995–96; 1996–97	
IHL First All-Star Team	Top performers at each position over the course of the season	Niklas Andersson (RW)	2000–01	
IHL First All-Star Team	Top performers at each position over the course of the season	Steve Larouche (LW)	2000–01	
IHL Second All-Star Team	Top performers at each position over the course of the season	Steve Maltais (LW)	1995–96; 1996–97	
IHL Second All-Star Team	Top performers at each position over the course of the season	Chris Marinucci (RW)	1998–99	
IHL Second All-Star Team	Top performers at each position over the course of the season	Tom Tilley (D)	1998–99	
IHL Second All-Star Team	Top performers at each position over the course of the season	Niklas Andersson (RW)	1999–2000	
IHL Second All-Star Team	Top performers at each position over the course of the season	Steve Larouche (LW)	1999–2000	
IHL Second All-Star Team	Top performers at each position over the course of the season	Dallas Eakins (D)	1999–2000	
IHL Second All-Star Team	Top performers at each position over the course of the season	Bob Nardella (D)	1999–2000	

==== International Hockey League All-Star Game selections ====
The IHL first started holding All-Star games in 1962. Initially the game format had the defending champion playing against a collection of All-Stars from the teams in the league. The game changed to an East vs. West in 1967, but returned to the original format in 2000. The Wolves hosted the game as defending champions in 2001. They entered the game as the last place team in the Western Conference. Despite their record Chicago won the game 4–0. It was the only shutout in IHL All-Star game history. During the contest Steve Maltais recorded a goal and an assist, the two-point performance made him the IHL's all-time leading scorer in All-Star competition with 12 points in 7 games.

Season	Player(s)	Ref
1994–95	Steve Maltais	
1995–96	Steve Maltais	
1996–97	Rob Brown, Steve Maltais, Troy Murray	
1997–98	Kevin Dahl, Ravil Gusmanov, Steve Maltais, Wendell Young	
1998–99	Niklas Andersson, Steve Maltais, Chris Marinucci, Tom Tilley, Pat Jablonski^{e}	
1999–2000	Steve Maltais	
2000–01	Team representation	

==== American Hockey League ====
In the 2006–07 season the Wolves had two players winning four individual trophies, three players garnering end of the year All-Star team honors, and two making the All-rookie team. The output was fueled by the Wolves' high scoring top line of Darren Haydar, Jason Krog, and Brett Sterling. Each player finished in the top 10 in AHL scoring with Haydar leading the league in points. Haydar also received the Les Cunningham Award as the league's Most Valuable Player (MVP). Sterling led the league in goal scoring and earned rookie of the year honors. In 2007–08 Krog led the league in goals, assists, and points, becoming only the third player in league history to accomplish the feat. His performance also earned him the MVP bringing his individual trophy total to three. He added a fourth after the Wolves won the Calder Cup and he was named playoff MVP.

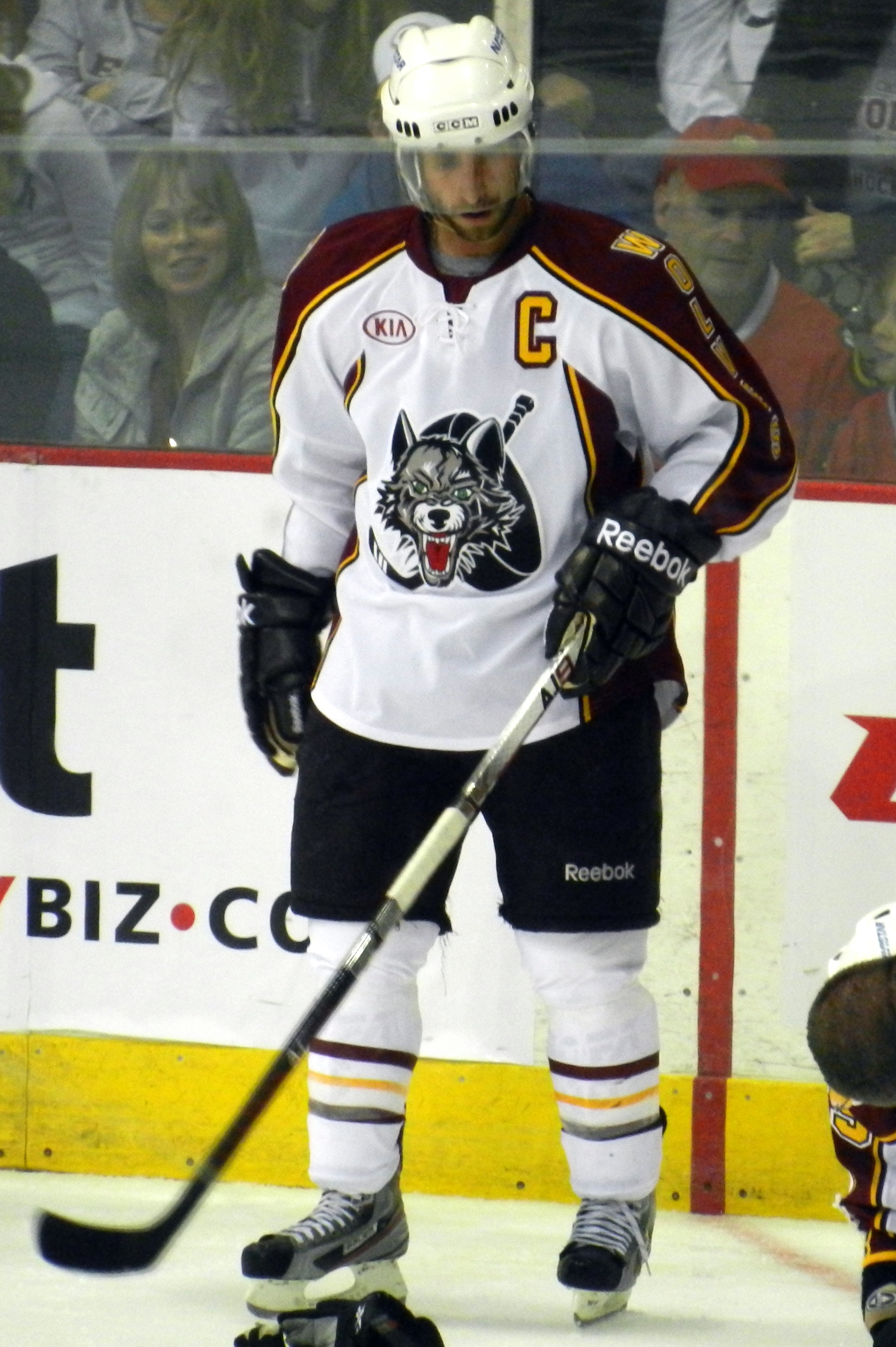
Darren Haydar has won multiple individual awards during the Wolves' time in the AHL

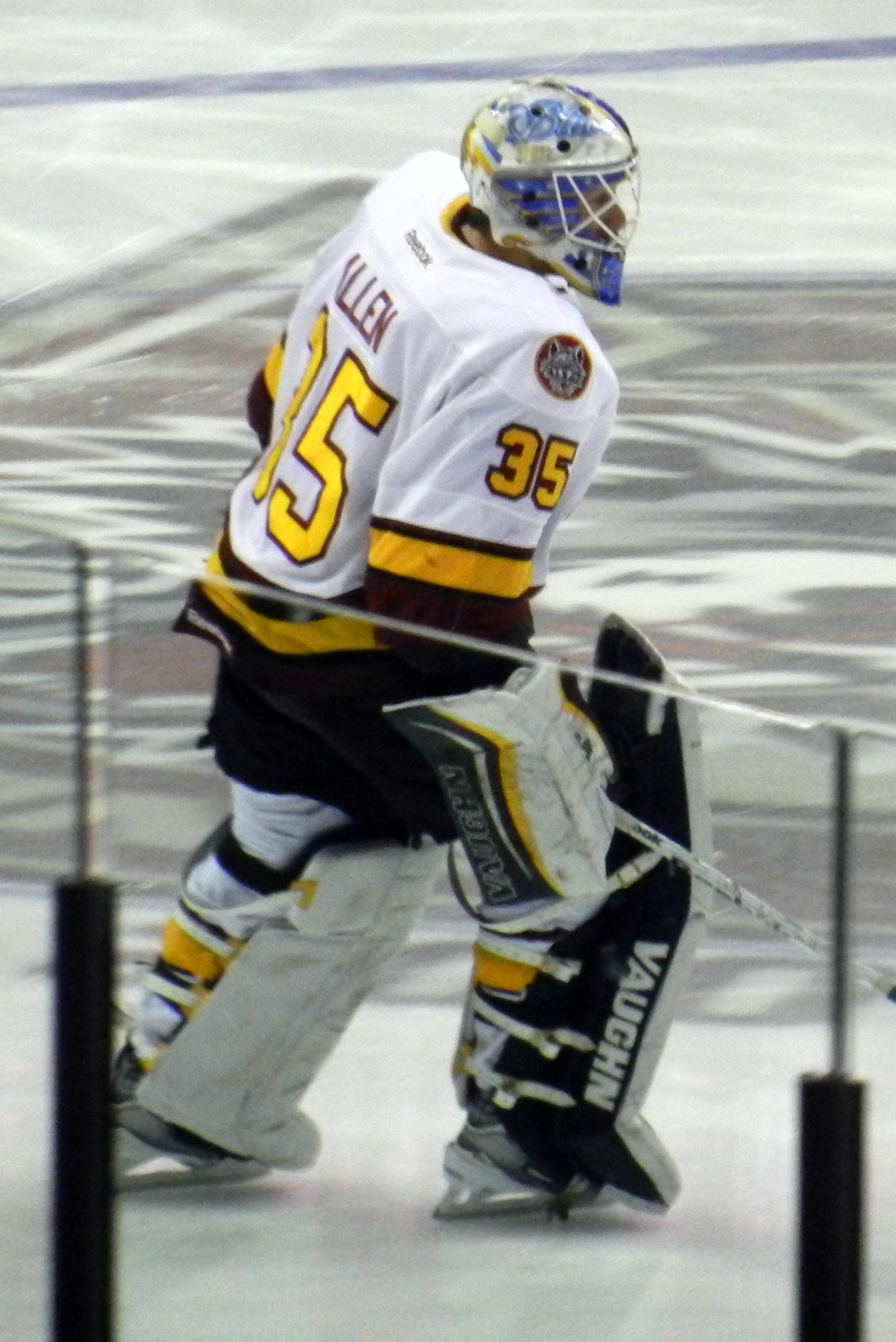
Jake Allen was an AHL First Team All-Star and won the Aldege "Baz" Bastien Memorial Award in 2013–14

Award	Description	Player	Season	Ref
Les Cunningham Award	Most Valuable Player	Darren Haydar	2006–07	
Les Cunningham Award	Most Valuable Player	Jason Krog	2007–08	
John B. Sollenberger Trophy	League leader in points	Steve Maltais	2002–03	
John B. Sollenberger Trophy	League leader in points	Darren Haydar	2006–07	
John B. Sollenberger Trophy	League leader in points	Jason Krog	2007–08	
Willie Marshall Award	League leader in goals scored	Brett Sterling	2006–07	
Willie Marshall Award	League leader in goals scored	Jason Krog	2007–08	
Aldege "Baz" Bastien Memorial Award	League's best goaltender	Jake Allen	2013–14	
Dudley "Red" Garrett Memorial Award	Rookie of the year	Brett Sterling	2006–07	
Yanick Dupre Memorial Award	Man of the year for service to his local community	Kurtis Foster	2003–04	
Jack A. Butterfield Trophy	Most Valuable Player of the playoffs	Pasi Nurminen	2001–02	
Jack A. Butterfield Trophy	Most Valuable Player of the playoffs	Jason Krog	2007–08	
AHL All-rookie Team	Top rookies at each position	Nathan Oystrick (D)	2006–07	
AHL All-rookie Team	Top rookies at each position	Brett Sterling (LW)	2006–07	
AHL First All-Star Team	Top performers at each position over the course of the season	Travis Roche (D)	2004–05	
AHL First All-Star Team	Top performers at each position over the course of the season	Brett Sterling (LW)	2006–07	
AHL First All-Star Team	Top performers at each position over the course of the season	Darren Haydar (RW)	2006–07	
AHL First All-Star Team	Top performers at each position over the course of the season	Jason Krog (C)	2007–08	
AHL First All-Star Team	Top performers at each position over the course of the season	Jake Allen (G)	2013–14	
AHL Second All-Star Team	Top performers at each position over the course of the season	Steve Maltais (LW)	2003–04	
AHL Second All-Star Team	Top performers at each position over the course of the season	Kari Lehtonen (G)	2004–05	
AHL Second All-Star Team	Top performers at each position over the course of the season	J.P. Vigier (RW)	2004–05	
AHL Second All-Star Team	Top performers at each position over the course of the season	Nathan Oystrick (D)	2006–07	
AHL Second All-Star Team	Top performers at each position over the course of the season	Joel Kwiatkowski (D)	2007–08	
AHL Second All-Star Team	Top performers at each position over the course of the season	Brett Sterling (LW)	2007–08	
AHL Second All-Star Team	Top performers at each position over the course of the season	Nigel Dawes^{d} (LW)	2010–11	
AHL Second All-Star Team	Top performers at each position over the course of the season	Darren Haydar (RW)	2010–11	

d: Dawes split time between Chicago and the Hamilton Bulldogs during the season.

==== American Hockey League All-Star Game selections ====
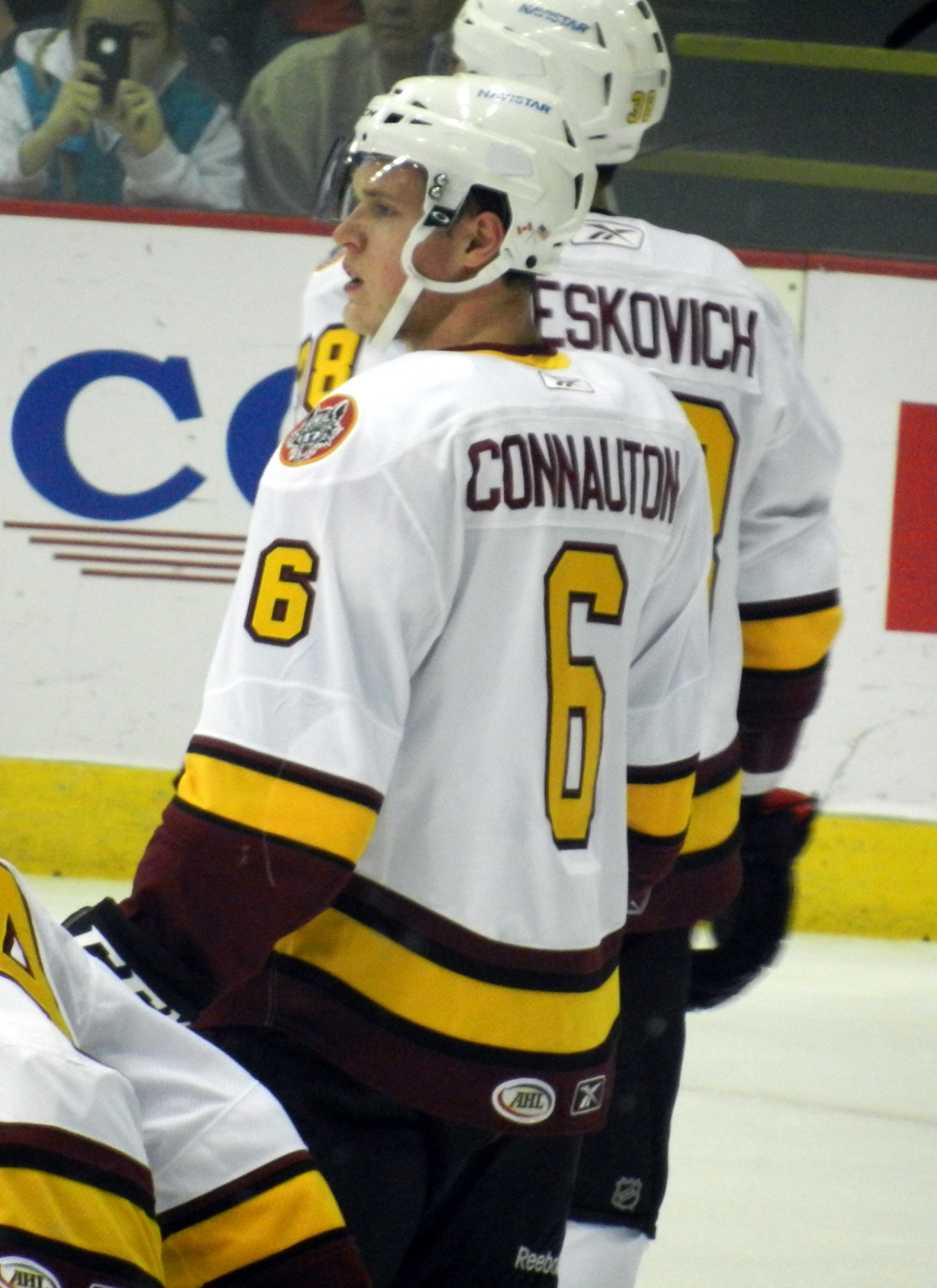
Kevin Connauton represented the Wolves at the 2012 All-Star Classic.

The AHL All-Star Classic is an exhibition game held yearly by the league since it was reintroduced in the 1994–95 season. Since the Wolves joined the league in 2001, twelve games have been played. During that time 22 Wolves' players have been selected to play in All-Star competition with Brett Sterling being the most frequent with 4 selections.

Season	Player(s)	Ref
2001–02	J.P. Vigier	
2002–03	Garnet Exelby,^{e} Kurtis Foster	
2003–04	Kari Lehtonen^{e}	
2004–05	Kari Lehtonen,^{f} Travis Roche	
2005–06	Braydon Coburn	
2006–07	Darren Haydar,^{f} Jason Krog,^{g} Nathan Oystrick, Brett Sterling^{f}	
2007–08	Jason Krog, Joel Kwiatkowski, Brett Sterling^{f}	
2008–09	Joe Motzko	
2009–10	Brett Sterling	
2010–11	Spencer Machacek, Paul Postma^{f}	
2011–12	Kevin Connauton, Darren Haydar^{f}^{h}	
2012–13	Brad Hunt, Brett Sterling^{e}	
2013–14	Jake Allen	
2014–15	Ty Rattie	

e: Player was selected for the game, but did not play due to injury.
f: Player was a starter for the All-Star Game.
g: Player was selected for the game, but did not play due to a National Hockey League call-up.
h: Player was named team captain for the game.

== Career achievements ==
The Chicago Wolves have retired two numbers in their history. Wendell Young was the first to receive the honor. Young played seven seasons for the Wolves and was a member of their two Turner Cup championship teams. He retired as the franchise leader in goaltender games played (322), wins (169), saves (8,467) and minutes played (17,912). The second retired number belonged to longtime forward Steve Maltais. Maltais was the only player to be part of the Wolves for their first 11 season. His longevity and production led to him being the Wolves all-time leader in goals (454); assists (496); points (950); penalty minutes (1,061) and games played (839).

The Wolves have also honored four individuals with permanent banners hanging in the Allstate Arena, two former players, a former head coach, and a former general manager. The two players, Tim Breslin and Dan Snyder, are both deceased. Snyder died during his playing career and Breslin shortly after his. While neither player recorded big statistical numbers, each was highly involved in the community and with charities during their time with the Wolves. They also honored John Anderson and Kevin Cheveldayoff for their contributions to the franchise. Anderson was head coach of the Wolves for all four of their championship teams. Likewise Cheveldayoff was general manager for the four championships and 12 years in total.

In 2013 defenseman Chris Chelios was elected to the Hockey Hall of Fame, becoming the first person affiliated with the organization to be so honored. Chelios joined the Wolves during the 2009–10 season at the age of 47 in hopes of earning a contract with a National Hockey League (NHL) team. He eventually signed with the Atlanta Thrashers and retired after the season.

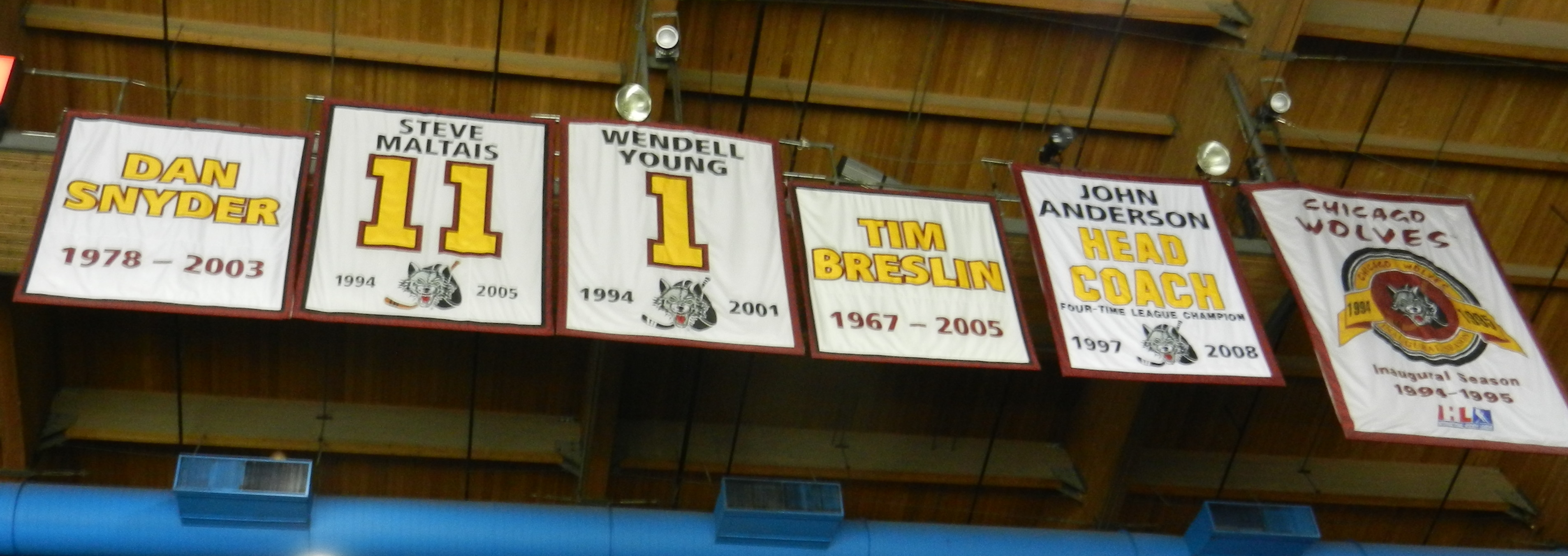
The Wolves' honoree banners hanging in the Allstate Arena

=== Retired numbers ===
Player	Number	Year	Years with the Wolves	Ref
Wendell Young	1	2001	1994–2001	
Steve Maltais	11	2006	1994–2005	

=== Personnel honored with banners ===
Player	Year	Years with the Wolves	Ref
Dan Snyder	2004	2001–03	
Tim Breslin	2005	1994–99	
John Anderson	2010	1997–2008	
Kevin Cheveldayoff	2013	1997–2009	

=== Hockey Hall of Fame ===
Player	Year	Years with the Wolves	Ref
Chris Chelios	2013	2009–10	

== Team awards ==
=== Dan Snyder Man of the Year Award ===
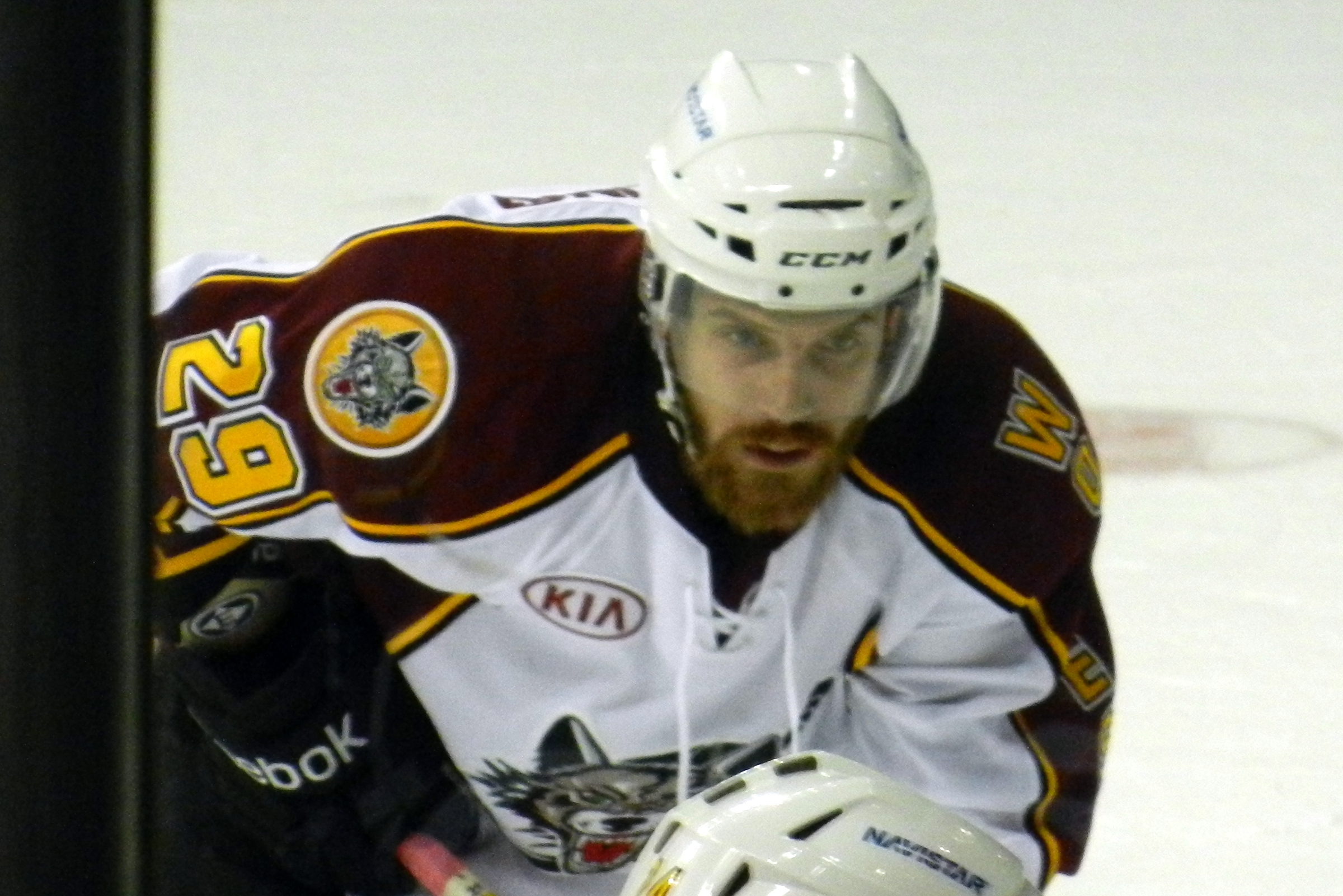
Brett Sterling was the Dan Snyder Man of the Year Award winner in 2010.

The Dan Snyder Man of the Year Award was created to honor former Wolves player Dan Snyder following his death from injuries resulting from a car accident. The award annually is given to the "Wolves' player who demonstrates the most outstanding dedication to Chicago-area community service each year."

Snyder played parts of two seasons with the Wolves, appearing in 91 games and registering 58 points. During the 2001–02 season he helped Chicago win their first Calder Cup. In his short time with the team, Snyder participated in numerous charitable events and "set an example to be followed by future members of the team." Snyder was critically injured after the Ferrari 360 Modena, being driven by his friend and teammate Dany Heatley, crashed. Snyder required surgery to repair a depressed skull fracture and was comatose. Six days after the accident on October 5, 2003 he lapsed into septic shock and died, never regaining consciousness.

Season	Player	Position	Ref
2003–04	Kurtis Foster	Defense	
2004–05	Karl Stewart	Left wing	
2005–06	Karl Stewart	Left wing	
2006–07	Brian Sipotz	Defense	
2007–08	Nathan Oystrick	Defense	
2008–09	Jordan LaVallee	Left wing	
2009–10	Brett Sterling	Left wing	
2010–11	Spencer Machacek	Right wing	
2011–12	Darren Haydar	Right wing	
2012–13	Michael Davies	Forward	
2013–14	Michael Davies	Forward	
2014–15	Shane Harper	Left wing	

=== Tim Breslin Unsung Hero Award ===
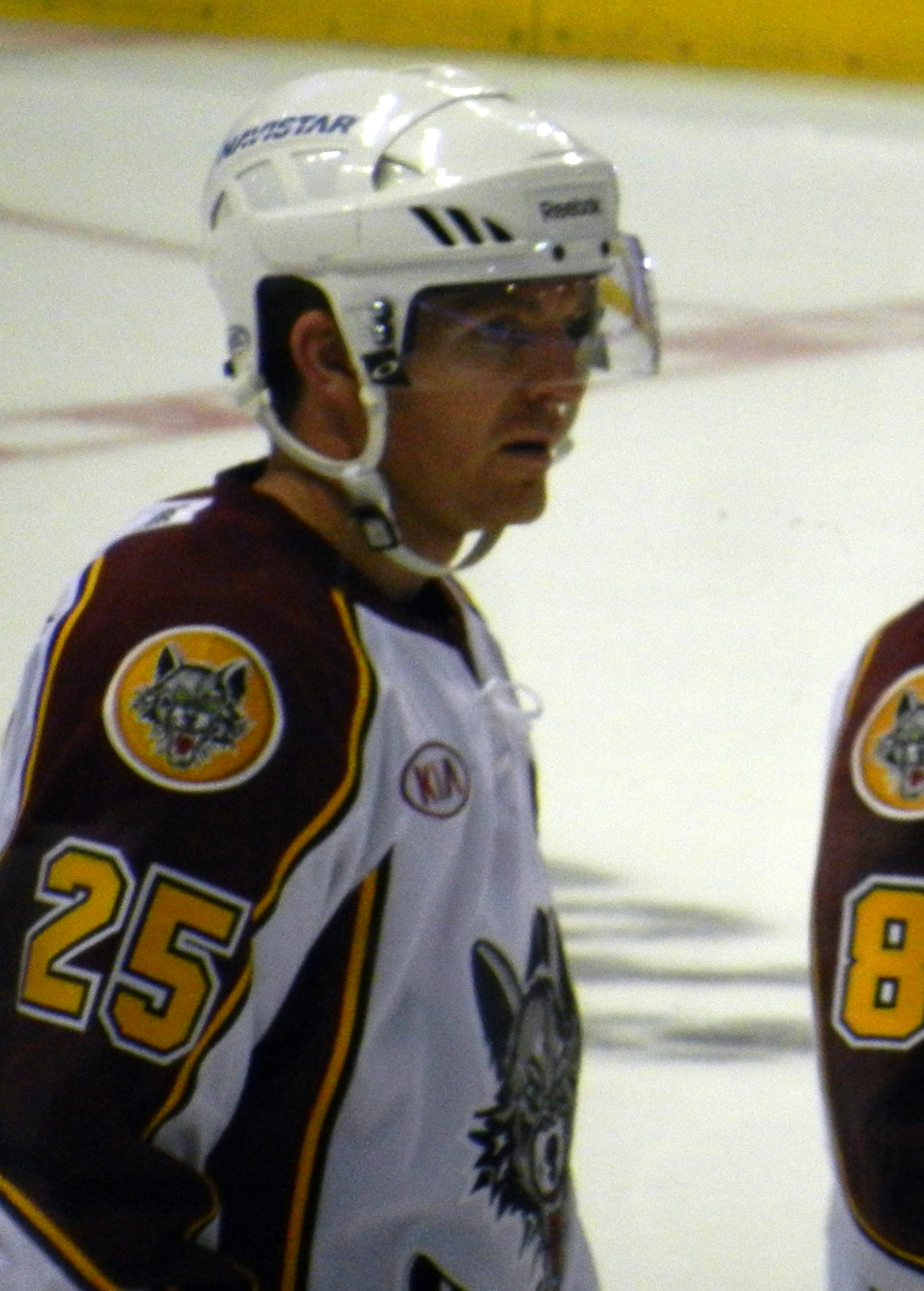
Mark Matheson was the 2012 winner of the Tim Breslin Unsung Hero Award.

The Tim Breslin Unsung Hero Award was created to honor former player Tim Breslin following his 2005 death due to complications from appendiceal cancer. The Award is handed out annually to a player who "best typifies Breslin's on-ice spirit and team-first attitude." Players are nominated by the Wolves hockey operations department, with an internet fan poll determining the winner.

Breslin was one of the first three players signed by the Wolves following their founding as an IHL expansion team. He played five seasons with the Wolves, scoring 37 goals, 119 points in 330 games and was a member of Chicago's 1998 Turner Cup championship team. While with the Wolves Breslin was highly involved in charitable work in the local community, both through the franchise and on his own. Former GM Cheveldayoff said of Breslin "You could always count on Tim to come and compete every night and do what was needed for the team to win".

Season	Player	Position	Ref
2004–05	Tim Wedderburn	Defense	
2005–06	Kevin Doell	Center	
2006–07	Brian Fahey	Defense	
2007–08	Brian Sipotz	Defense	
2008–09	Steve Martins	Center	
2009–10	Matt Anderson	Forward	
2010–11	Jaime Sifers	Defense	
2011–12	Mark Matheson	Defense	
2012–13	Bill Sweatt	Left wing	
2013–14	Brent Regner	Defense	
2014–15	Brent Regner	Defense	
