= Chicago Cheetahs =

- City: Chicago, Illinois (1994); Villa Park, Illinois (1995)
- Founded: 1994
- Home arena: UIC Pavilion (1994); Odeum Expo Center (1995)
- Colors: Burnt Orange, Tapioca, Black, White
- Murphy Cups: None
- Conference Championships: None
- Division Championships: None

Franchise history
- Chicago Cheetahs (1994–1995)

The Chicago Cheetahs were a professional roller hockey team based in Chicago, Illinois, United States, that played in Roller Hockey International. The Cheetahs joined the league in 1994. The Cheetahs were part-owned by basketball legend George Mikan.

Former Chicago Blackhawks star Al Secord was part of the Cheetahs in 1994, as were future Chicago Wolves players Bobby Nardella, Jeff Rohlicek and Tim Breslin.

The Cheetahs played at the UIC Pavilion during the 1994 regular season in front of an average of 2,000 fans per game, but moved their playoff home games to the Odeum in suburban Villa Park to save money. Co-owner Mike Ryan then moved all Cheetahs home contests to the 4,000-seat Odeum in 1995 in an effort to reach out to fans living where roller hockey was played in the suburban streets. Cheetahs games home and away in 1994 and their playoff games in 1995 were carried on WAUR (930-AM) Radio with Les Grobstein handling the play-by-play. The franchise folded after their second season as several checks made out by Ryan bounced.

== Alumni who also played in the NHL ==
- Randy Boyd
- Ron Handy
- Jeff Rohlicek
- Al Secord
- Harry York
