= Brian Sipotz =

American ice hockey player (born 1981)

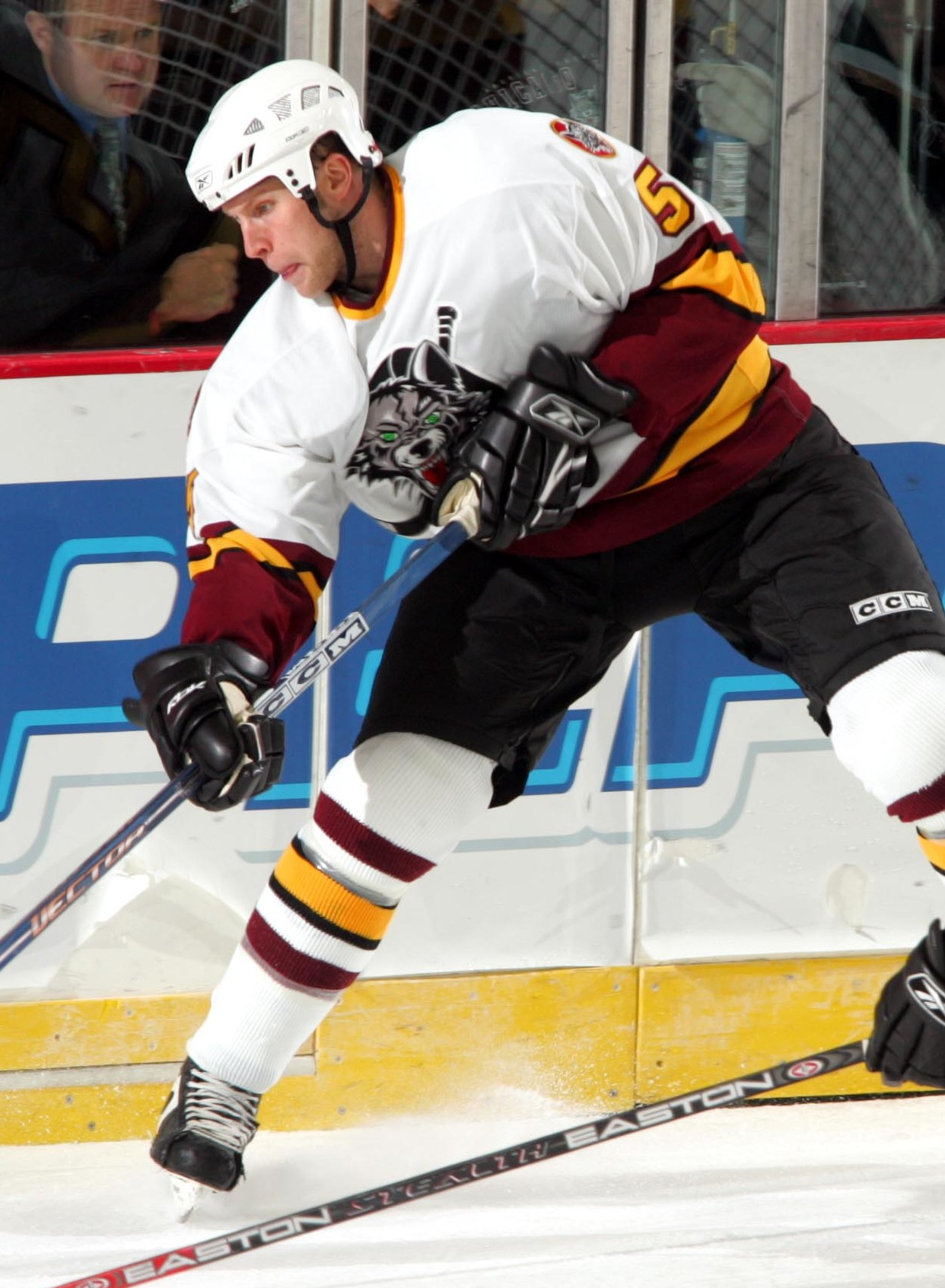
- Sipotz with the Chicago Wolves in 2005
- Born: September 16, 1981 (age 45) South Bend, Indiana, U.S.
- Height: 6 ft 7 in (201 cm)
- Weight: 248 lb (112 kg; 17 st 10 lb)
- Position: Defense
- Shot: Right
- Played for: Chicago Wolves; Gwinnett Gladiators; SG Cortina
- NHL draft: 100th overall, 2001; Atlanta Thrashers
- Playing career: 2004–2011

Brian Sipotz (born September 16, 1981) is a retired American professional ice hockey player. He played collegiate hockey at Miami University, and retired after the 2010–11 season with SG Cortina of the Italian Hockey League.

== Collegiate career ==
Sipotz played junior hockey for Culver Military Academy before signing to play US college hockey for the Miami RedHawks of the Central Collegiate Hockey Association (CCHA). Sipotz was selected by the Atlanta Thrashers in the 4th round (100th overall) of the 2001 NHL entry draft after his freshman season. Sipotz played an integral defensive role for Miami, tallying 5 assists and 139 penalty minutes in his career, which culminated in his senior season with the program's third ever trip to the NCAA Tournament in 2004. Miami lost to eventual national champion Denver in the West Regional 3–2, with Sipotz being assessed a pivotal 3-period major and game misconduct for a check from behind on Pioneer Jon Foster.

== Professional career ==
Brian played 7 years of professional hockey, including 6 years with the Chicago Wolves, the American Hockey League affiliate of Atlanta. In that time, he was the spokesman for the Wolves’ Adopt-A-Dog program, a two time Chicago Sports Profile Hometown Hero award winner, and the American Hockey League Man of the Year finalist. Brian was also a league leader in plus/minus in 2006–07, and made two AHL championship Calder Cup finals appearances, including a Calder Cup championship campaign in 2008 with Chicago. He finished his professional career in 2010–11 with SG Cortina in Italy.

== Personal life ==
Sipotz, with a degree in exercise physiology from Miami University is now a coach in Ann Arbor, Michigan for Hockey University and Advantage Personal Training. He resides in Milan, Michigan with his wife and family.

== Career statistics ==
			Regular season					Playoffs
Season	Team	League	GP	G	A	Pts	PIM	GP	G	A	Pts	PIM
1998–99	Culver Military Academy	HS Prep
1999–2000	Culver Military Academy	HS Prep
2000–01	Miami University	CCHA	32	0	1	1	48	—	—	—	—	—
2001–02	Miami University	CCHA	25	0	1	1	28	—	—	—	—	—
2002–03	Miami University	CCHA	26	0	0	0	24	—	—	—	—	—
2003–04	Miami University	CCHA	36	0	3	3	39	—	—	—	—	—
2004–05	Chicago Wolves	AHL	75	2	6	8	31	18	1	2	3	6
2004–05	Gwinnett Gladiators	ECHL	2	0	0	0	0	—	—	—	—	—
2005–06	Chicago Wolves	AHL	57	2	12	14	41	—	—	—	—	—
2006–07	Chicago Wolves	AHL	72	2	10	12	36	8	0	0	0	2
2007–08	Chicago Wolves	AHL	54	1	4	5	22	20	0	4	4	14
2008–09	Chicago Wolves	AHL	66	2	5	7	36	—	—	—	—	—
2009–10	Chicago Wolves	AHL	44	0	8	8	51	8	0	0	0	4
2009–10	Gwinnett Gladiators	ECHL	3	0	0	0	0	—	—	—	—	—
2010–11	SG Cortina	ITA	34	0	4	4	26	—	—	—	—	—
AHL totals			369	9	45	54	217	54	1	6	7	26
