= Dan Snyder (ice hockey) =

- Born: February 23, 1978 Elmira, Ontario, Canada
- Died: October 5, 2003 (aged 25) Atlanta, Georgia, U.S.
- Height: 6 ft 1 in (185 cm)
- Weight: 196 lb (89 kg; 14 st 0 lb)
- Position: Centre
- Shot: Left
- Played for: Atlanta Thrashers
- NHL draft: Undrafted
- Playing career: 1999–2003

Daniel Joseph Snyder (February 23, 1978 – October 5, 2003) was a Canadian professional ice hockey player. He played as a centre in the National Hockey League (NHL) for the Atlanta Thrashers. Following a single-vehicle accident in which he was a passenger, Snyder was injured and fell into a coma as a result. He died six days later of septic shock.

Although he played in only forty-nine NHL games, the Thrashers named an annual award after him. The Dan Snyder Memorial Award is given each year to the player who "best embodies perseverance, dedication, and hard work without reward or recognition, so that his team and teammates might succeed." After the Thrashers relocated to Winnipeg, the Jets continued to present the award. The American Hockey League's (AHL) Chicago Wolves also have a yearly award given in his honor, the Dan Snyder Man of the Year Award, and have honored him by hanging a banner with other retired numbers and honored personnel. Likewise, the Ontario Hockey League renamed their Humanitarian of the Year trophy in his honor as the Dan Snyder Memorial Trophy.

== Playing career ==
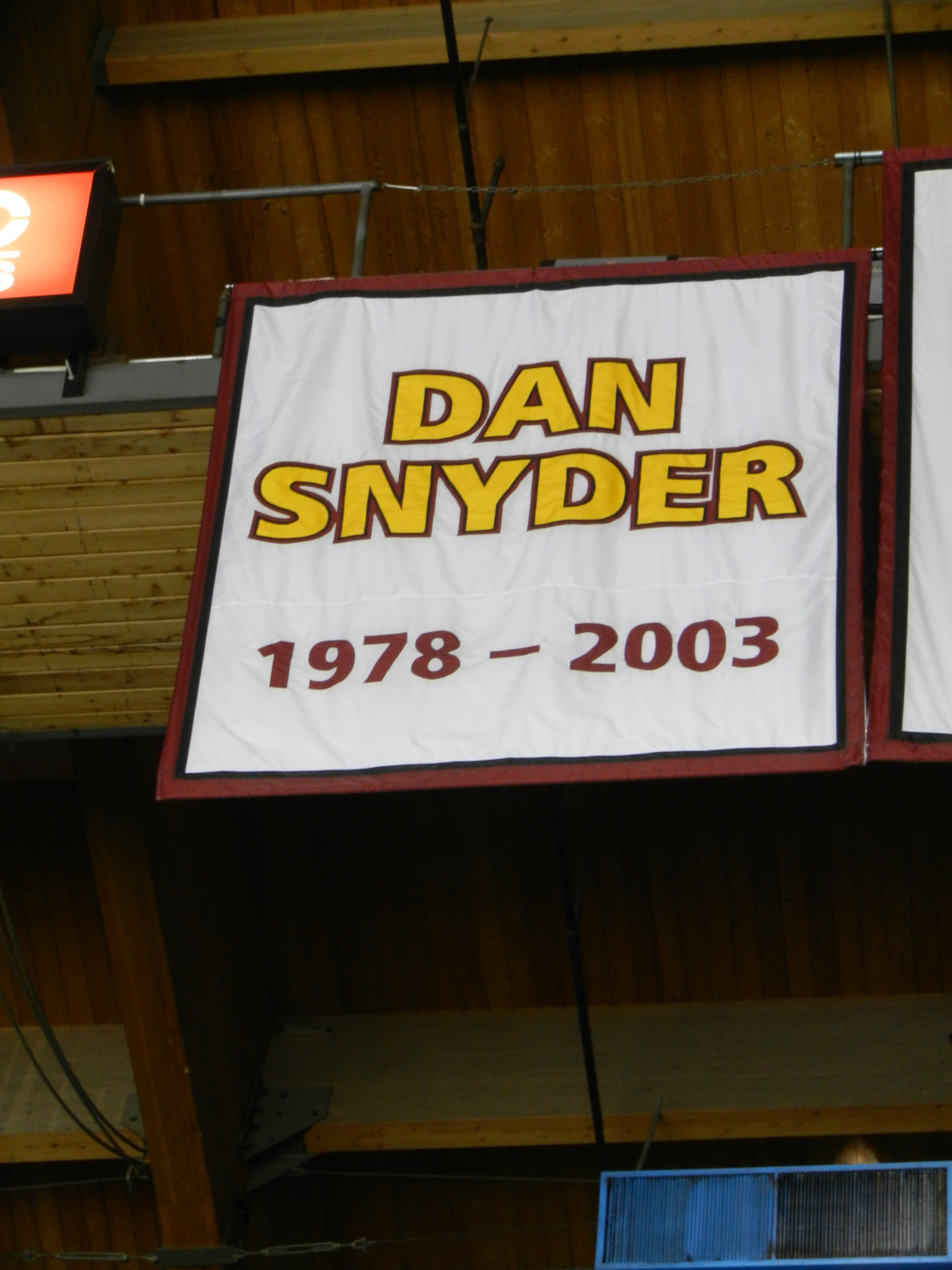
The Chicago Wolves banner honoring Snyder

=== Junior ===
In 1994, Snyder was one of the last players selected for his hometown Junior B team, the Elmira Sugar Kings. He struggled early in the season and was warned that if his poor play continued, he might be replaced. Snyder's play improved following the talk, eventually earning the Sugar Kings rookie of the year honors. The following year he tried out for the Owen Sound Platers, a Major junior team playing in the Ontario Hockey League (OHL). After starting his try-out slowly, the coaching staff gave him the option to stop and pursue an NCAA scholarship. Snyder decided to continue his try-out and made the team after leading the Platers in scoring during the exhibition season. He played four years for the Platers, registering 75 goals and 221 points, captaining the team in his final two seasons.

=== Professional ===
Undrafted, Snyder was signed by the Thrashers as a free agent in 1999. During his time in the minor leagues, he was a member of the International Hockey League champion Orlando Solar Bears in 2000–2001, and the American Hockey League champion Chicago Wolves. In 2001–2002, he was called up to the NHL. He scored 10 goals and four assists in 36 games with the Thrashers in the 2002–2003 season.

== Death and legacy ==
On September 29, 2003, Snyder was critically injured after the Ferrari 360 Modena, being driven by his friend and teammate Dany Heatley, crashed. Heatley, who was driving between 55 and 82 miles per hour (89 and 132 km/h) in a 35 miles per hour (56 km/h) zone, lost control and skidded into a brick pillar and iron fence. Both players were ejected from the car, which was split in half by the force of the impact. Snyder required surgery to repair a depressed skull fracture and was comatose. Six days later on October 5, he lapsed into septic shock and died, never regaining consciousness. Heatley was charged with vehicular homicide as a result of the crash, a sentence that could have carried as much as 15 years in prison. He pleaded guilty to second-degree vehicular homicide, driving too fast for conditions, failure to maintain a lane, and speeding. He was sentenced to three years' probation and ordered to give 150 speeches on the dangers of speeding, and pay $25,000 to Fulton County for the cost of investigating the crash. The lighter sentence was due in part to Snyder's parents forgiving Heatley for the accident, their desire that he not be sent to prison, and the judge's opinion that Heatley being in prison would not benefit the community.

A replica of the patch the Thrashers wore in memory of Dan Snyder

The following season, Atlanta dedicated the season to Snyder and Heatley, while further honoring Snyder with a patch displaying his number 37 on it and painting the same logo on the boards. Snyder was further honored with the creation of The Dan Snyder Memorial Scholarship. The scholarships were to be given to three recipients from the Elmira area. On December 31, 2003, the Thrashers played the Detroit Red Wings; during the game both teams wore the commemorative patch. Following the game the NHLPA auctioned off the game-worn jerseys with the proceeds going towards the scholarships; the resulting auction raised $56,029. The Chicago Wolves paid tribute to Snyder by renaming their community service award the Dan Snyder Man of the Year Award, while the OHL renamed their Humanitarian of the Year trophy in his honor, making it the Dan Snyder Memorial Trophy.

During the 2006–07 NHL season, Snyder's parents, Graham and LuAnn Snyder, traveled across North America in an RV attending NHL games and speaking at engagements to raise awareness for the Dan Snyder Memorial Foundation, a foundation that provides four college scholarships a year and helps raise money for the Elmira Recreation Centre.

Canadian band The Tragically Hip recorded a song called "Heaven Is a Better Place Today" in honor of Snyder. The song appears on their In Between Evolution album.

In 2003, plans for a new sports complex in Elmira were completed with a projected completion date in 2017. Snyder felt that the project needed to be completed much more quickly and wanted to help make it happen sooner. After his death, the Dan Snyder Memorial Foundation contributed $750,000 to the project, which opened in 2009. The main arena houses the Sugar Kings and was named the Dan Snyder Memorial Arena. The Atlanta Thrashers held a practice and promotional session in the arena on October 18, 2009.

In 2016, goaltender Connor Hellebuyck made his debut for the Winnipeg Jets franchise, which moved from Atlanta five years prior. On opening night, he was granted permission from Snyder's family to wear the jersey #37 in his honor.

== Career statistics ==
			Regular season					Playoffs
Season	Team	League	GP	G	A	Pts	PIM	GP	G	A	Pts	PIM
1995–96	Owen Sound Platers	OHL	63	8	17	25	78	6	1	2	3	4
1996–97	Owen Sound Platers	OHL	57	17	29	46	96	4	2	3	5	6
1997–98	Owen Sound Platers	OHL	46	23	33	56	74	10	2	3	5	16
1998–99	Owen Sound Platers	OHL	64	27	67	94	110	16	8	5	13	30
1999–00	Orlando Solar Bears	IHL	71	12	13	25	123	6	1	2	3	4
2000–01	Orlando Solar Bears	IHL	78	13	30	43	127	16	7	3	10	20
2000–01	Atlanta Thrashers	NHL	2	0	0	0	0	—	—	—	—	—
2001–02	Chicago Wolves	AHL	56	11	24	35	115	22	7	10	17	25
2001–02	Atlanta Thrashers	NHL	11	1	1	2	30	—	—	—	—	—
2002–03	Atlanta Thrashers	NHL	36	10	4	14	34	—	—	—	—	—
2002–03	Chicago Wolves	AHL	35	11	12	23	39	—	—	—	—	—
NHL totals			49	11	5	16	64	—	—	—	—	—

== See also ==
- List of ice hockey players who died during their careers
