= Tim Breslin =

American ice hockey player (1967–2005)

- Born: December 8, 1967 Downers Grove, Illinois, US
- Died: February 9, 2005 (aged 37) St. Charles, Illinois, US
- Height: 6 ft 0 in (183 cm)
- Weight: 180 lb (82 kg; 12 st 12 lb)
- Position: Left wing
- Shot: Left
- Played for: Phoenix Roadrunners; South Carolina Stingrays; Chicago Cheetahs; Chicago Wolves
- NHL draft: Undrafted
- Playing career: 1991–1999

Timothy G. Breslin (December 8, 1967 – February 9, 2005) was an American professional ice hockey player. A left wing, Breslin played eight seasons in the International Hockey League (IHL) with the Phoenix Roadrunners and Chicago Wolves and part of a season in the ECHL with the South Carolina Stingrays. He also played major league roller hockey in Roller Hockey International (RHI) with the Chicago Cheetahs.

Breslin attended Lake Superior State University. While a freshman he helped the Lakers win the school's first national championship in 1988. He served as an alternate captain in his senior season while also tying two school records, points in a game (7) and points in a series (10). Undrafted out of college, he signed with the Los Angeles Kings as a free agent. He spent four years in their minor league system playing for Phoenix and South Carolina. After a brief stint in the RHI, he joined the Wolves as a free agent. As a member of the Wolves, Breslin was highly involved in charitable activities which led to him winning IHL Man of the Year honors in the 1996–97 season. He was a member of Chicago's Turner Cup champion team the following year.

Late in 2004 Breslin was diagnosed with cancer and died 11 weeks later on February 9, 2005, due to complications from appendiceal cancer. To honor him the Wolves created the Tim Breslin Unsung Hero Award and the Tim Breslin Memorial Scholarship. As a way of helping his family financially, they hosted an exhibition game dubbed the Breslin Cup.

== Early life ==
Tim was born in Downers Grove, Illinois, on December 8, 1967, to James and Kathleen Breslin. He was one of six children, having three sisters and two brothers. Breslin grew up in Addison, Illinois, where he began playing hockey at age five. He learned the game while playing with his brothers on a frozen pond near the family home and on a backyard rink his father made. As he got older Breslin played in local leagues and Driscoll Catholic High School's club team, which afforded him the opportunity to join the Dubuque Fighting Saints in the United States Hockey League.

== Playing career ==
=== Amateur ===
Breslin joined the Fighting Saints for his high school senior year and played an additional season after graduation. His performance in Dubuque helped earn a scholarship to Lake Superior State University (LSSU). In his freshman season with the Lakers, Breslin contributed 6 goals and 20 points, as LSSU finished first in the Central Collegiate Hockey Association (CCHA). Advancing to the 1988 NCAA Division I Men's Ice Hockey Tournament, the Lakers defeated Merrimack College and University of Maine to reach the championship game. In the title game LSSU defeated St. Lawrence to earn its first National Championship. For the 1988–89 season Breslin improved to 7 goals while remaining at 20 points. LSSU finished second in the CCHA and in the 1989 NCAA Tournament they lost to eventual national champion Harvard in the quarterfinals. In his junior season Breslin continued to produce at about the same pace, registering 8 goals and 25 points. The Lakers again finished second in the CCHA, and in the 1990 NCAA Tournament they advanced to the quarterfinals for the second straight year where they were defeated by national champion runner-up Colgate.

In his senior season Breslin was named one of the team's alternate captains. Playing on a line with future National Hockey League (NHL) player Doug Weight, Breslin had a break-out season. He set career highs in goals (25), assists (37), and points (62). During the year he tied a school record for points in a game with a seven-point performance against Ohio State. The scoring output helped him tie another school record when the two teams played the following day. Adding another three points in the second game, Breslin brought his two-game total to 10, tying the record for points in a series. Lake Superior State finished first in the CCHA, but was again defeated in the quarterfinals of the 1991 NCAA Tournament.

=== Professional ===
Undrafted out of college, Breslin signed with the Los Angeles Kings as a free agent. He attended Kings training camp, where he played with his professional hockey hero, Wayne Gretzky. Breslin failed to make the team and Los Angeles assigned him to their International Hockey League (IHL) affiliate the Phoenix Roadrunners. In his first season with Phoenix, Breslin broke his arm early in the season. He returned to play just three weeks after the injury, but eventually re-broke the arm and missed the remainder of the season. He finished his first professional season playing in 45 games, scoring 8 goals and 29 points. In the 1992–93 season Breslin improved his production to 14 goals and a career-high 44 points. Phoenix finished the season with a league-low 26 wins and 58 points. He began his third professional season with the Roadrunners, but after five games he was reassigned to the ECHL's South Carolina Stingrays. Breslin played nine games for the Stingrays, registering six points, before being recalled by Phoenix. Finishing the year with the Roadrunners, he registered 9 goals and 27 points in 50 games. Phoenix improved to 85 points but failed to make the playoffs for the third straight year. At the conclusion of the season, Breslin's contract with the Kings expired.

In the summer Breslin joined the Chicago Cheetahs of the Roller Hockey International (RHI) league for the 1994 season. Playing in just 6 games, Breslin recorded 5 goals and 13 points. Prior to the start of the 1994–95 IHL season, Breslin signed a one-year contract with the Chicago Wolves. He was one of the first three players signed by the Wolves who began their first season as an IHL expansion team. In his first season with the Wolves, Breslin notched 7 goals and 28 points. Chicago finished with 80 points—good enough for third in their division and to qualify for the playoffs. Facing the Kalamazoo Wings in the first round, Chicago was swept in three straight games. Playing in his first professional playoffs, Breslin contributed two points playing in all three games. In the off-season Breslin negotiated his own contract to stay in Chicago, signing a two-year deal. Over the next two seasons, Breslin averaged 56 games played a season due to knee and shoulder injuries. As a team the Wolves qualified for the playoffs in both seasons but failed to advance beyond the second round. At the conclusion of the 1996–97 season, Breslin was awarded the I. John Snider trophy as IHL Man of the Year, an award given to recognize outstanding community service.

In the off-season Breslin again re-signed with the Wolves. Chicago also brought in John Anderson to be the team's new head coach. Under Anderson, Breslin had posted a career high in assists with 26 and games played with 81. Chicago won the West division and finished with the second-best record in the league. In the postseason the Wolves stormed through the first three rounds, losing only four games, to advance to the 1998 Turner Cup Finals. In game 1 of the finals against the Detroit Vipers, Chicago blew a two-goal lead early in the third period. They regained the lead with just over eight minutes to play. In the final minutes of the game, Breslin added an insurance empty net goal giving the Wolves a 4–2 victory. It was Breslin's only goal of the playoffs. The series eventually went to a seventh and deciding game that the Wolves won 3–0 to capture the franchise's first Turner Cup. For the 1998–99 season Breslin's production dipped to 7 goals and 21 points. The Wolves advanced to the third round the playoffs, but Breslin played in only 4 of the team's 10 games. On the first day of training camp the following year, Breslin announced his retirement from professional hockey.

== Playing style ==
Listed as a left wing, Breslin was capable of playing all three forward positions, an ability which gave his coaches flexibility and allowed him to play in any situation. Not a big player, standing six feet tall weighing 180 pounds, he played a gritty, physical, brand of hockey primary in a checking line role. As a checker it was his responsibility to shut down the opposition and keep them from scoring, emphasizing defense over offense. Because of his versatility and role, he was often a member of his team's penalty killing unit. Breslin was known for his team-first attitude and willingness to do whatever was asked of him in order to help the team succeed. Former Wolves General Manager Kevin Cheveldayoff said of Breslin, "You could always count on Tim to come and compete every night and do what was needed for the team to win". Not the most talented of players, Breslin's work ethic helped him to be a better player. Head coach Anderson once stated, "He is the kind of player who maybe isn't in the very upper echelon in skill factor, but his dedication and hard work make up for that."

== Personal ==
Breslin married Jami Rutili, and the couple had three children, Shane, Paige, and Chase. He earned a degree in recreation management while at Lake Superior State. During his career, Breslin was involved in numerous charities. He delivered food on Thanksgiving for the Chris Zorich Foundation; conducted self-esteem workshops for an anti-drug, anti-gang organization; participated in the Wolves' Read to Succeed program, in which he read to children at local libraries; and several others. In a 1997 interview, Breslin said that the most special charity he helped was one started by him and his wife. The Extra Effort program was started at Indian Trail Junior High School in Addison, where Jami was a teacher. Each month the program gave both a male and a female student four tickets to a Wolves game and a gift bag. The students were chosen based on attitude, effort and attendance. After retiring from professional hockey, he coached youth hockey and helped manage an Irish pub.

== Death and legacy ==
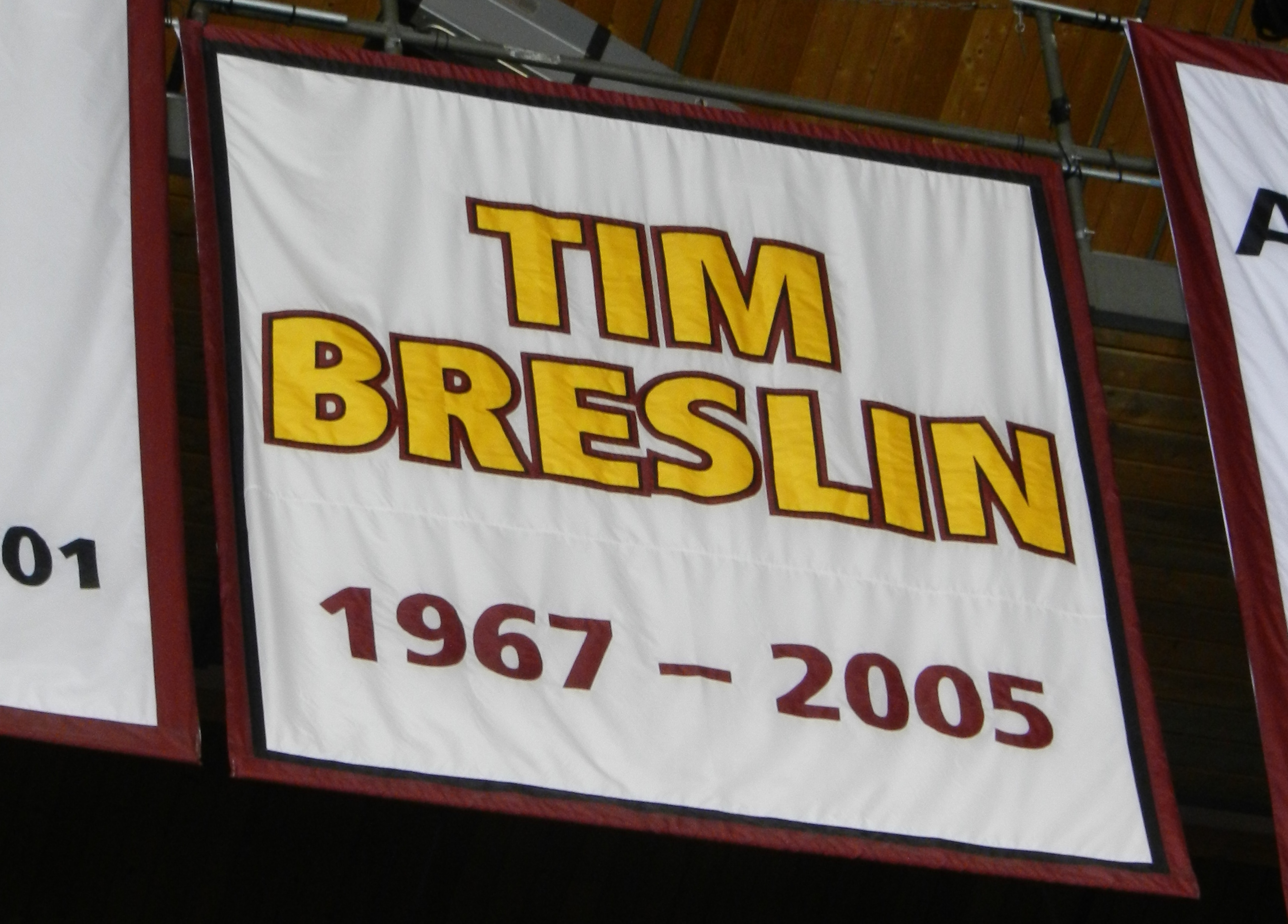
Chicago Wolves banner honoring Breslin

After complaining of stomach pains for several days, Breslin was taken to a hospital on Thanksgiving of 2004. There he was diagnosed with appendiceal cancer and underwent surgery. He died eleven weeks later on February 9, 2005, due to complications from the cancer. The Wolves honored Breslin by wearing a helmet sticker shaped like a shamrock with his initials inside of it for the 2004–05 season. As a way of helping his family financially, the Wolves and Chicago Blackhawks put on a charity game called the "Breslin Cup". The game featured 40 players, most of whom were former players from the two franchises. All the proceeds from the game went to a trust set up for the family. The game drew around 10,000 fans, with the Wolves' alumni defeating the Blackhawks' alums in a shootout. The Breslin Cup and associated events raised over $250,000 for the family.

The following season the Wolves further honored Breslin with an on-ice ceremony that concluded with the raising of a banner of his name. They also created a team award called the Tim Breslin Unsung Hero Award, to be given annually to a player who "best typifies Breslin's on-ice spirit and team-first attitude", and a college scholarship, the Tim Breslin Memorial Scholarship, in his honor. A winner is chosen each season from students who fill out an entry form and write a corresponding essay. The scholarship pays for one semester of college. Breslin was inducted into the Illinois Hockey Hall of Fame in 2013.

== Career statistics ==
			Regular season					Playoffs
Season	Team	League	GP	G	A	Pts	PIM	GP	G	A	Pts	PIM
1987–88	Lake Superior State University	CCHA	38	6	14	20	18	—	—	—	—	—
1988–89	Lake Superior State University	CCHA	42	7	13	20	34	—	—	—	—	—
1989–90	Lake Superior State University	CCHA	46	8	17	25	20	—	—	—	—	—
1989–90	Lake Superior State University	CCHA	45	25	37	62	26	—	—	—	—	—
1991–92	Phoenix Roadrunners	IHL	45	8	21	29	12	—	—	—	—	—
1992–93	Phoenix Roadrunners	IHL	79	14	30	44	55	—	—	—	—	—
1993–94	Phoenix Roadrunners	IHL	50	9	18	27	29	—	—	—	—	—
1993–94	South Carolina Stingrays	ECHL	9	3	3	6	4	—	—	—	—	—
1994	Chicago Cheetahs	RHI	6	5	8	13	4	—	—	—	—	—
1994–95	Chicago Wolves	IHL	71	7	21	28	62	3	1	1	2	0
1995–96	Chicago Wolves	IHL	62	11	11	22	56	9	2	2	4	12
1996–97	Chicago Wolves	IHL	44	2	10	12	18	4	0	2	2	4
1997–98	Chicago Wolves	IHL	81	10	26	36	90	21	1	3	4	22
1998–99	Chicago Wolves	IHL	72	7	14	21	72	4	0	0	0	4
IHL totals			504	68	151	219	394	41	4	8	12	42
