= Chicago Wolves =

American Hockey League team in Rosemont, Illinois

- City: Rosemont, Illinois
- League: American Hockey League
- Conference: Western
- Division: Central
- Founded: 1994 (IHL)
- Home arena: Allstate Arena
- Colors: Burgundy, gold, black, white
- Mascot: Skates the Gray Wolf
- Owner: Don Levin
- General manager: Darren Yorke
- Head coach: Spiros Anastas
- Captain: Josiah Slavin
- Media: My50; The U AHL.TV (Internet)
- Affiliates: Carolina Hurricanes (NHL); Greensboro Gargoyles (ECHL)
- Website: chicagowolves.com

Franchise history
- 1994–present: Chicago Wolves

Championships
- Regular season titles: 1 IHL (1999–2000); 1 AHL (2021–22)
- Division titles: 4 IHL (1997–98, 1998–99, 1999–00, 2000–01); 10 AHL (2004–05, 2007–08, 2009–10, 2011–12, 2013–14, 2016–17, 2017–18, 2018–19, 2020–21, 2021–22)
- Conference titles: 3 IHL (1997–98, 1999–00, 2000–01); 6 AHL (2001–02, 2004–05, 2007–08, 2018–19, 2021–22, 2025–26)
- Turner Cups: 2 (1997–98, 1999–2000)
- Calder Cups: 3 (2001–02, 2007–08, 2021–22)

Current uniform
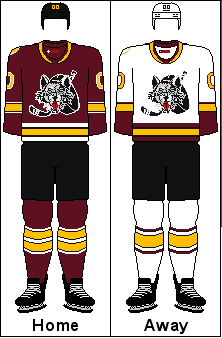

The Chicago Wolves are a professional ice hockey team based in the Chicago metropolitan area. They are the American Hockey League (AHL) affiliate of the Carolina Hurricanes of the National Hockey League (NHL). The Wolves play home games at the Allstate Arena.

Originally a member of the International Hockey League, the Wolves joined the AHL after the IHL folded in 2001.

== History ==
The Wolves were formed in January 24, 1994 by Don Levin, Buddy Meyers, and Grant Mulvey. The team won the Turner Cup twice (1998, 2000) in the IHL and the Calder Cup three times (2002, 2008, and 2022). The Wolves qualified for all but five postseasons (2005–06, 2008–09, 2010–11, 2012–13, and 2015–16 seasons), appearing in eight league championship finals (1998, 2000, 2001, 2002, 2005, 2008, 2019 and 2022) in their 22-year history.

The team's most notable player was forward Steve Maltais, who until his retirement after the 2004–05 season had played every season of the franchise and holds most of its scoring records. Other notable players include goaltender Wendell Young, ex-Pittsburgh star Rob Brown and long time Chicago Blackhawks stars Troy Murray, Chris Chelios and Al Secord. The Wolves had their best season start in their 14-year history, during the 2007–08 season, winning 13 of the first 14 games, with an overtime loss. The Wolves finished the season with 111 points, and first in the Western Conference.

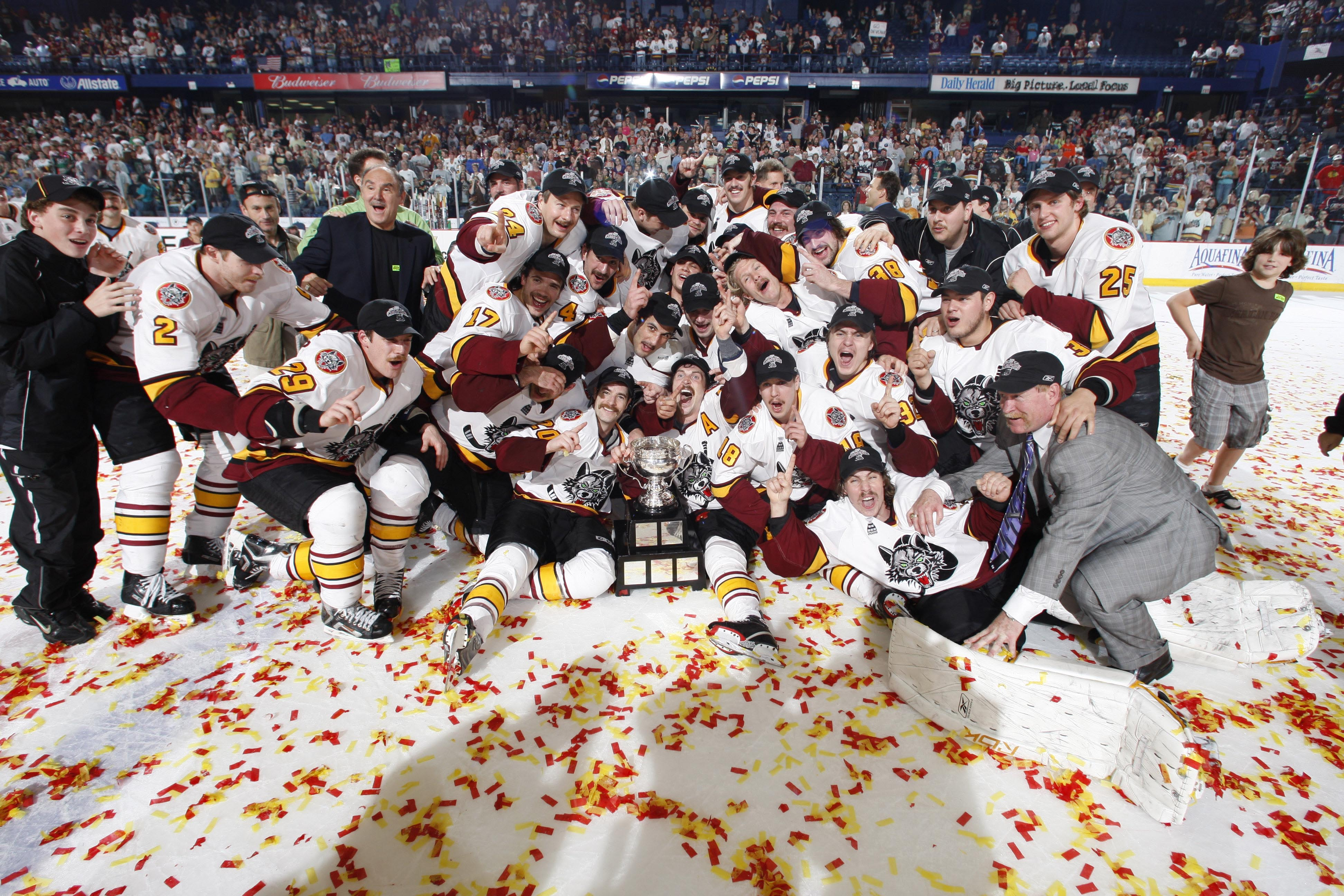
2007–08 Wolves with the Calder Cup

The Wolves were the AHL affiliate of the Atlanta Thrashers from 2001 to 2011. The Thrashers relocated to Winnipeg in June 2011 and added the St. John's IceCaps (formerly the Manitoba Moose) as their new AHL affiliate, leaving the Wolves and the NHL's Vancouver Canucks to find new affiliates. On June 27, 2011, the Wolves and Canucks agreed to a two–year affiliation agreement.

On April 23, 2013, the Wolves and St. Louis Blues reached a three-year affiliation agreement. The deal was struck after the Canucks and Wolves decided not to renew their existing affiliation agreement and purchased the Peoria Rivermen franchise from the Blues creating the Utica Comets. In November 2016, it was first reported the Blues would not renew their affiliation with the Wolves and were planning to move their affiliation to Kansas City for 2017. However, this was unconfirmed and then denied by the announced potential owner in Kansas City, Lamar Hunt Jr., in a press release from his ECHL team in the area, the Missouri Mavericks, and further denied by AHL commissioner, David Andrews, after the January 2017 Board of Governors meeting.

After the 2016–17 season, the Wolves became the first affiliate of the NHL's expansion team, the Vegas Golden Knights. The Blues did not re-sign with the Wolves to be their primary NHL affiliate for the 2017–18 season. However, Blues' general manager Doug Armstrong confirmed they would still send prospects to the Wolves for that season.

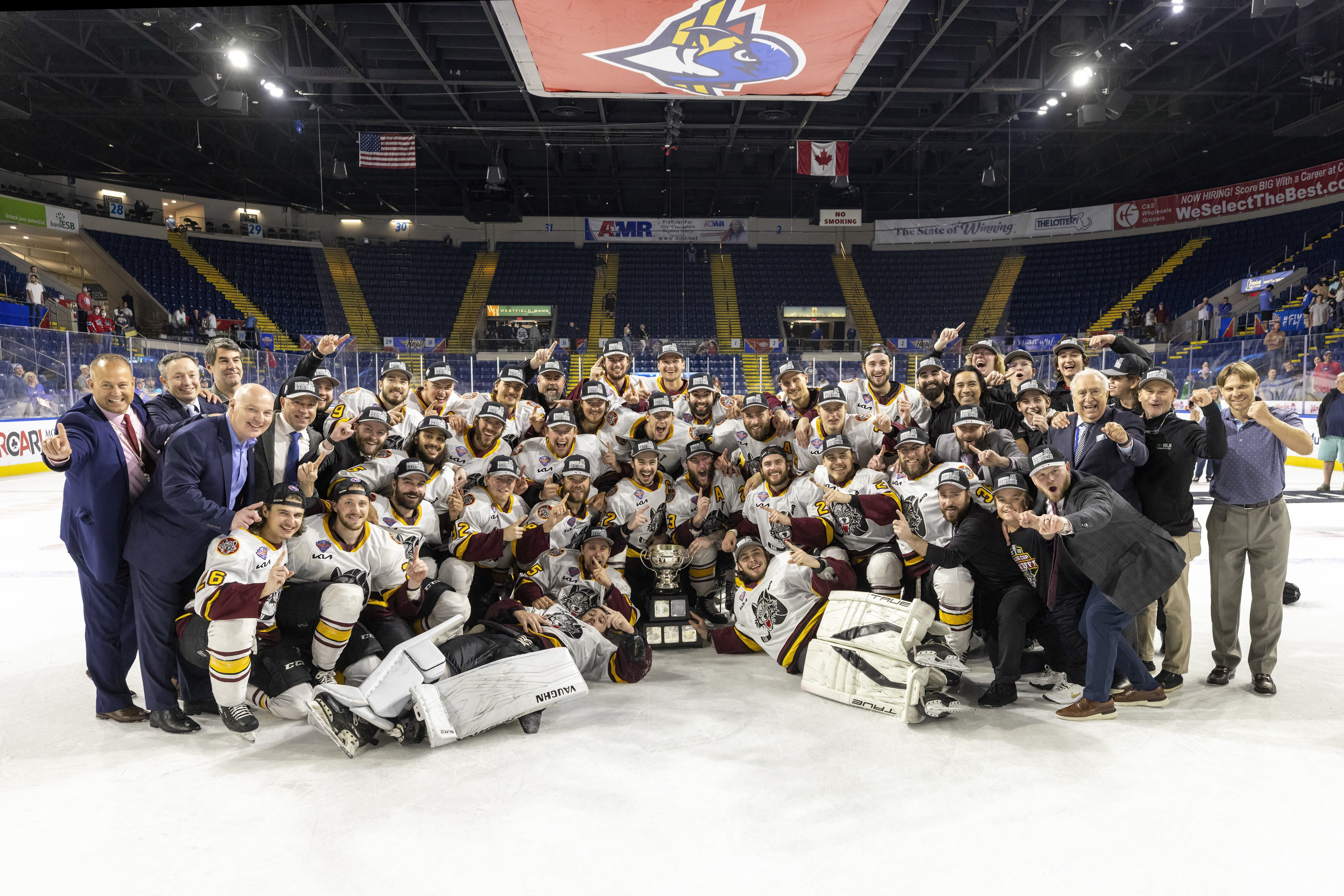
2021–22 Wolves with the Calder Cup

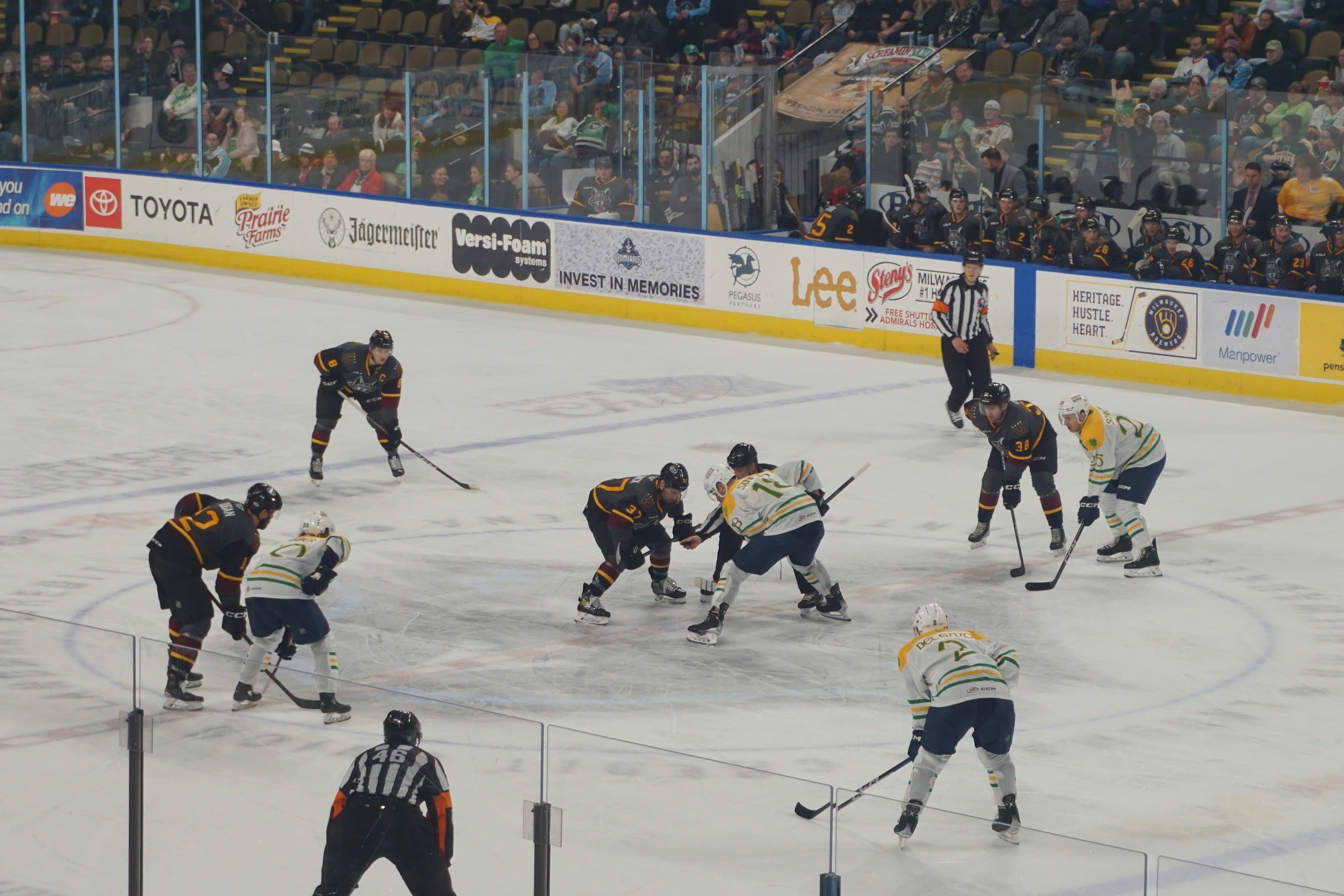
The Wolves playing at the Milwaukee Admirals in 2023

During the first season of their affiliation with Vegas, the Wolves set a pair of franchise records in earning points in 14 straight games from December 9 to January 6 and 13 consecutive home wins from December 6 to February 15. In the 2018–19 season, the Wolves made the Calder Cup Finals, in which they lost to the Charlotte Checkers in five games. During the 2019–20 season, the Golden Knights stated it was looking to own and operate its own AHL team in the Las Vegas region in 2020–21, but it would not be the Wolves. The Golden Knights agreed to purchase the San Antonio Rampage franchise and move it to the Las Vegas area as the Henderson Silver Knights. On September 10, 2020, the Wolves announced an affiliation agreement with the Carolina Hurricanes. In addition, the Wolves added a temporary secondary NHL affiliate in the Nashville Predators for the 2020–21 season as the Predators' affiliate, the Milwaukee Admirals, opted out of the COVID-19 pandemic-shortened season. For the 2020–21 season, the teams' home games were at their training facility at the Triphahn Center in Hoffman Estates due to arena restrictions for fans during the pandemic.

During the 2023–24 season, the Wolves played as independent AHL team, becoming the first independent AHL team since the 1994–95 season. On May 2, 2024, the team renewed its affiliation with the Carolina Hurricanes for a three-year term beginning with the 2024–25 season.

On May 6, 2025, the Greensboro Gargoyles, an ECHL expansion team in Greensboro, North Carolina, beginning play in October 2025, announced their affiliation with the Carolina Hurricanes, which in turn aligned them with the Wolves, as the AA farm team. Greensboro was the original home of the Carolina Hurricanes for two years after their move from Hartford, Connecticut, before moving to Raleigh, North Carolina, while waiting for their arena to be constructed.

== Television ==
The Wolves once were the only AHL team with a full television package. As the Chicago Blackhawks' late owner Bill Wirtz had refused to allow Blackhawks home games to be televised locally, the Wolves were viewed and embraced as an alternative; the Wolves took advantage of this, going so far as to promote themselves with the slogan "We Play Hockey The Old-Fashioned Way: We Actually Win". After Judd Sirott served as the team's play-by-play announcer for its first 12 seasons, starting in the 2006–07 season broadcast announcers were long-time Blackhawks commentators Pat Foley and Bill Gardner; Foley ultimately returned to the Blackhawks for the 2008–09 season after Bill Wirtz died and his son Rocky took over the team, reversing many of his father's policies, one of which allowed the Blackhawks' games to be aired locally on TV. Since 2008, Jason Shaver has handled the play-by-play duties for the Wolves, along with Gardner.

Today, select regular-season home games are broadcast on WPWR-TV (My50), and WMEU-CD (The U), and all games are streamed on AHLTV.

== Season-by-season results ==
This is a partial list of the last five seasons completed by the Wolves. For the full season-by-season history, see List of Chicago Wolves seasons

| Regular season | | | | | | | | | | | Playoffs | | | | | |
| Season | Games | Won | Lost | OTL | SOL | Points | PCT | Goals for | Goals against | Standing | Year | Div. 1st Rd | Div. Semi | Div. Finals | Conf. Finals | Calder Cup Finals |
|---|---|---|---|---|---|---|---|---|---|---|---|---|---|---|---|---|
| 2021–22 | 76 | 50 | 16 | 5 | 5 | 110 | .724 | 261 | 194 | 1st, Central | 2022 | — | W, 3–0, RFD | W, 3–1, MIL | W, 4–2, STO | W, 4–1, SPR |
| 2022–23 | 72 | 35 | 29 | 5 | 3 | 78 | .542 | 227 | 244 | 6th, Central | 2023 | Did not qualify | | | | |
| 2023–24 | 72 | 23 | 35 | 7 | 7 | 60 | .417 | 192 | 253 | 7th, Central | 2024 | Did not qualify | | | | |
| 2024–25 | 72 | 37 | 31 | 4 | 0 | 78 | .542 | 205 | 223 | 4th, Central | 2025 | L, 0–2, RFD | — | — | — | — |
| 2025–26 | 72 | 36 | 21 | 8 | 7 | 87 | .604 | 225 | 218 | 2nd, Central | 2026 | — | W, 3–2, TEX | W, 3–1, GR | W, 4–3, COL | L, 1–4, TOR |

== Players ==
=== Current roster ===
Updated November 19, 2026.

| No. | Nat | Player | Pos | S/G | Age | Acquired | Birthplace | Contract |
|---|---|---|---|---|---|---|---|---|
| 3 | (Czech Republic) | Dominik Badinka | D | R | 20 | 2025 | Chomutov, Czech Republic | Hurricanes |
| 22 | (United States) | Skyler Brind'Amour | C | L | 27 | 2024 | Raleigh, North Carolina | Hurricanes |
| 15 | (United States) | Charlie Cerrato | C | L | 21 | 2026 | Fallston, Maryland | Hurricanes |
| 28 | (United States) | Braden Doyle (PTO) | D | L | 25 | 2026 | Beverly, Massachusetts | Wolves |
| 65 | (Sweden) | Noel Fransén | D | L | 20 | 2026 | Karlstad, Sweden | Hurricanes |
| 37 | (Canada) | David Gagnon | LW | L | 26 | 2025 | Halifax, Nova Scotia | Wolves |
| 21 | (Finland) | Aleksi Heimosalmi | D | R | 23 | 2024 | Pori, Finland | Hurricanes |
| 51 | (Finland) | Juha Jaaska | LW | L | 28 | 2024 | Helsinki, Finland | Hurricanes |
| 7 | (Canada) | Pierre-Olivier Joseph | D | L | 27 | 2026 | Laval, Quebec | Hurricanes |
| 5 | (Canada) | Charles-Alexis Legault | D | R | 23 | 2024 | Laval, Quebec | Hurricanes |
| 58 | (United States) | Bryce Montgomery | D | R | 24 | 2024 | Washington, D.C. | Hurricanes |
| 82 | (Canada) | Bradly Nadeau | LW | R | 21 | 2024 | Saint-François-de-Madawaska, New Brunswick | Hurricanes |
| 79 | (Russia) | Viktor Neuchev | LW | L | 23 | 2026 | Chelyabinsk, Russia | Hurricanes |
| 9 | (Sweden) | Joel Nystrom | D | R | 24 | 2025 | Karlstad, Sweden | Hurricanes |
| 30 | (United States) | Cayden Primeau | G | L | 27 | 2025 | Farmington Hills, Michigan | Hurricanes |
| 93 | (Canada) | Justin Robidas (A) | C | R | 23 | 2024 | Plano, Texas | Hurricanes |
| 18 | (Russia) | Ivan Ryabkin | C | L | 19 | 2025 | Balakovo, Russia | Hurricanes |
| 6 | (Russia) | Stiven Sardarian | RW | L | 23 | 2026 | St. Petersburg, Russia | Wolves |
| 36 | (Canada) | Zach Sawchenko | G | L | 28 | 2026 | Calgary, Alberta | Hurricanes |
| 8 | (Canada) | Ronan Seeley (A) | D | L | 24 | 2022 | Yellowknife, Northwest Territories | Hurricanes |
| 12 | (Sweden) | Gabriel Seger | C | L | 27 | 2026 | Uppsala, Sweden | Wolves |
| 23 | (United States) | Josiah Slavin (C) | LW | L | 27 | 2024 | Erie, Colorado | Wolves |
| 14 | (Sweden) | Felix Unger Sorum | RW | R | 21 | 2024 | Trondheim, Norway | Hurricanes |
| 41 | (Canada) | Evan Vierling | C | L | 24 | 2025 | Aurora, Ontario | Wolves |
| 29 | (Canada) | Chase Wheatcroft | F | L | 24 | 2026 | Calgary, Alberta | Wolves |

=== Team captains ===
- Steve Maltais; 1994–96, 1997–2000, 2001–05
- Troy Murray; 1996–97
- Kevin Dahl; 2000–01
- Derek MacKenzie; 2005–06
- Darren Haydar; 2007–08, 2012–13
- Jamie Rivers; 2008–09
- Jason Krog; 2009–11
- Nolan Baumgartner; 2011–12
- Taylor Chorney; 2013–14
- Brent Regner; 2014–15
- Pat Cannone; 2015–16
- Chris Butler; 2016–17
- Paul Thompson; 2017–18
- Andrew Poturalski; 2021–22
- Max Lajoie; 2022–23
- Chris Terry; 2023–24
- Josiah Slavin; 2024–present

=== American Hockey League Hall of Famers ===
AHL Hall of Fame Honored Members
| Name | Seasons | Induction Year |
|---|---|---|
| John Anderson | 1997-2008, 2013-16 (head coach); 2023-24 (asst. coach) | 2019 |
| Keith Aucoin | 2013-14 (player) | 2022 |
| Nolan Baumgartner | 2011-12 (player); 2012-13 (asst. coach) | 2022 |
| Frederic Cassivi | 2001-04 (player) | 2015 |
| Alexandre Giroux | 2007-08 (player) | 2026 |
| Darren Haydar | 2006-08, 2010-13 (player) | 2020 |
| Michael Leighton | 2017-18 (player) | 2025 |
| Wendell Young | 1994-2001 (player); 2001- (executive) | 2026 |

=== Notable alumni ===
The following players have played both 100 games for the Wolves and 100 games in the National Hockey League:

- Niklas Andersson
- Ivan Barbashev
- Tim Bergland
- Jordan Binnington
- Rob Brown
- Chris Butler
- Jordan Caron
- Dylan Coghlan
- Kevin Connauton
- Joey Crabb
- Kevin Dahl
- Joe DiPenta
- Dallas Eakins
- Joel Edmundson
- Garnet Exelby
- Glen Featherstone
- Kurtis Foster
- Nicolas Hague
- Jani Hakanpaa
- Greg Hawgood
- Brad Hunt
- Keegan Kolesar
- Jason Krog
- Kari Lehtonen
- Mackenzie MacEachern
- Derek MacKenzie
- Steve Maltais
- Steve Martins
- Kip Miller
- Brian Noonan
- Scott Pearson
- Brandon Pirri
- Dan Plante
- Paul Postma
- Jordan Schroeder
- Al Secord
- Tom Tilley
- J.P. Vigier
- Mike Weaver
- Zach Whitecloud
- Wendell Young

=== Retired numbers ===
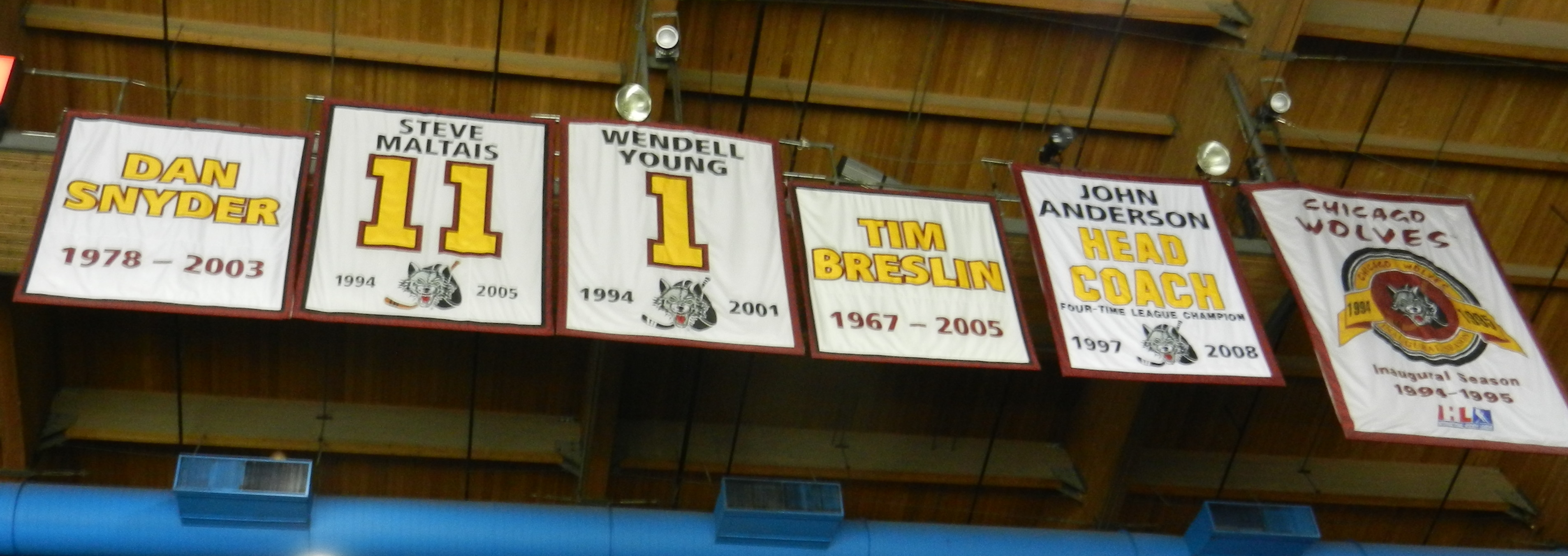
Wolves retired numbers and honored personnel

Chicago Wolves retired numbers
| No. | Player | Position | Career | No. retirement |
|---|---|---|---|---|
| 1 | Wendell Young | G | 1994–2001 | December 1, 2001 |
| 11 | Steve Maltais | LW | 1994–2005 | April 15, 2006 |

Although Nos. 16 and 19 have not officially been retired, they have not been issued since the deaths of Tim Breslin and Dan Snyder respectively.

== Team records ==
=== Single season ===
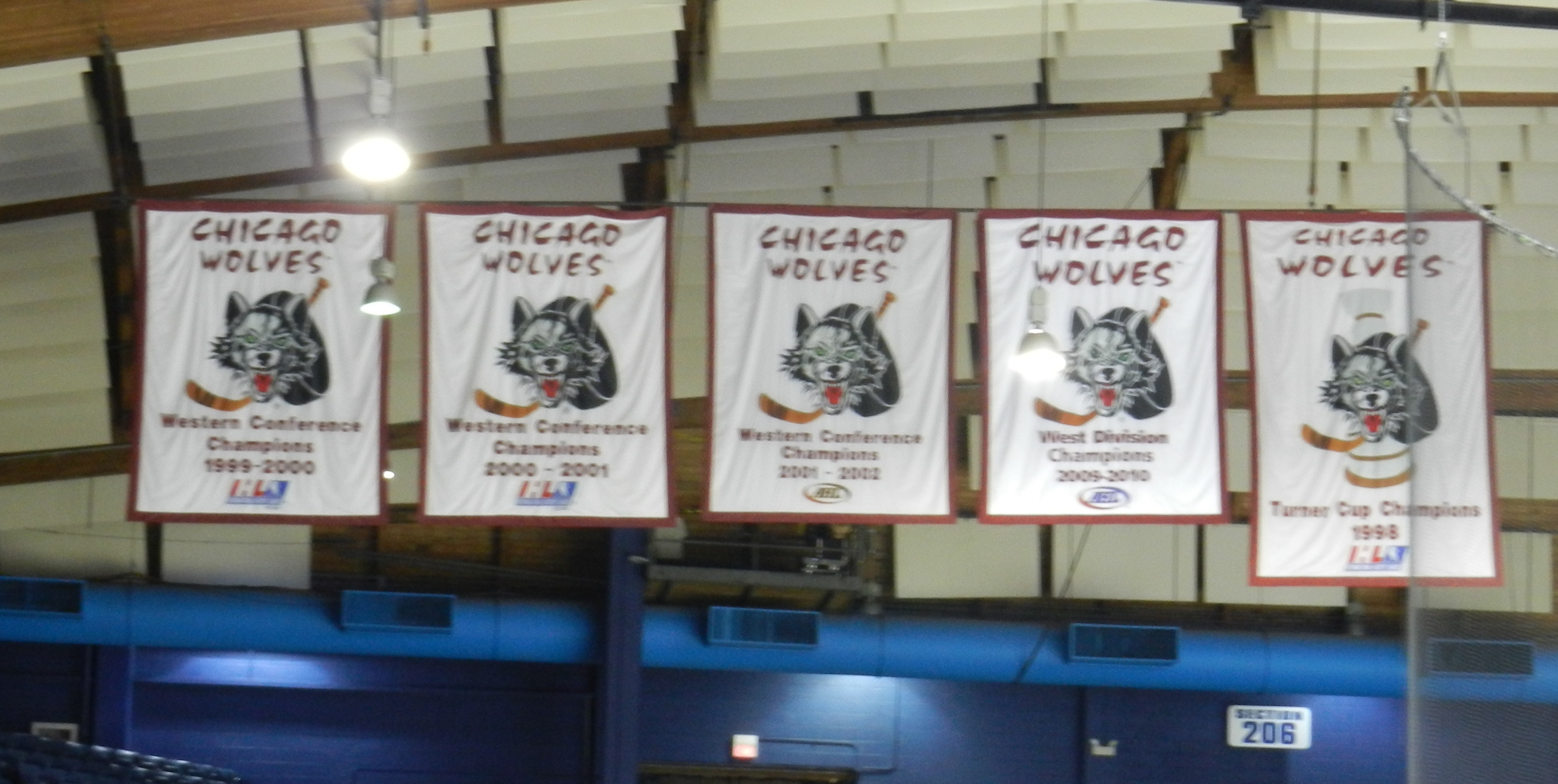
Some of the Wolves banners hanging in the Allstate Arena

| Type | Number | Player | Season |
|---|---|---|---|
| Goals | 60 | Steve Maltais | 1996–97 |
| Assists | 91 | Rob Brown | 1995–96 |
| Points | 143 | Rob Brown | 1995–96 |
| Penalty minutes | 390 | Kevin MacDonald | 1994–95 |
| Hat-tricks | 5 | Steve Maltais | 1996–97 |
| Power play goals | 27 | Steve Maltais | 1995–96 & 1996–97 |
| Short-handed goals | 7 | Ben Simon | 2002–03 |
| Plus–minus | +47 | Arturs Kulda | 2009–10 |
| Wins | 38 | Kari Lehtonen | 2004–05 |
| Shutouts | 7 | Jake Allen | 2013–14 |

=== Career ===
| Type | Number | Player |
|---|---|---|
| Goals | 454 | Steve Maltais |
| Assists | 497 | Steve Maltais |
| Points | 951 | Steve Maltais |
| Penalty minutes | 1061 | Steve Maltais |
| Hat-tricks | 18 | Steve Maltais |
| Power play goals | 195 | Steve Maltais |
| Short-handed goals | 21 | Derek MacKenzie |
| Game winning goals | 67 | Steve Maltais |
| Games played | 839 | Steve Maltais |
| Wins | 169 | Wendell Young |
| Shutouts | 16 | Wendell Young |

== See also ==
- List of Chicago Wolves award winners

== Bibliography ==
- Skelnik, Justin, ed. (2012). 2012–13 Chicago Wolves Media Guide.
