= Steve Maltais =

Canadian ice hockey player (born 1969)

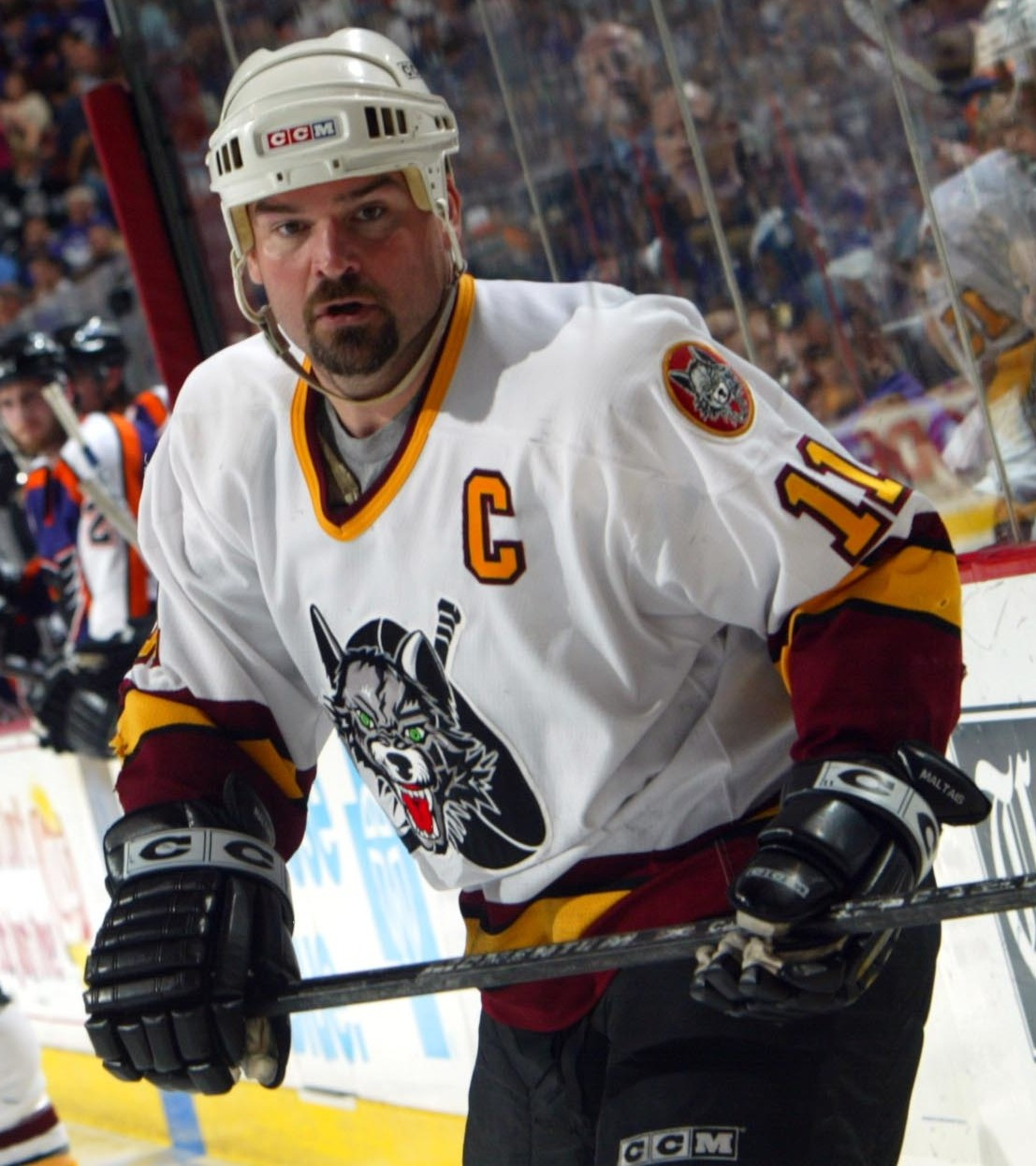
- Maltais with the Chicago Wolves in 2005
- Born: January 25, 1969 (age 57) Arvida, Quebec, Canada
- Height: 6 ft 2 in (188 cm)
- Weight: 205 lb (93 kg; 14 st 9 lb)
- Position: Left wing
- Shot: Left
- Played for: AHL; Baltimore Skipjacks; Halifax Citadels; Adirondack Red Wings; Chicago Wolves; NHL; Washington Capitals; Minnesota North Stars; Tampa Bay Lightning; Detroit Red Wings; Columbus Blue Jackets
- NHL draft: 57th overall, 1987; Washington Capitals
- Playing career: 1989–2005

Steve Maltais (born January 25, 1969) is a Canadian-American ice hockey coach and former player. He was originally selected by the Washington Capitals in the 1987 NHL entry draft. He is the current head coach of the Chicago Cougars of the United States Premier Hockey League (USPHL).

== Playing career ==
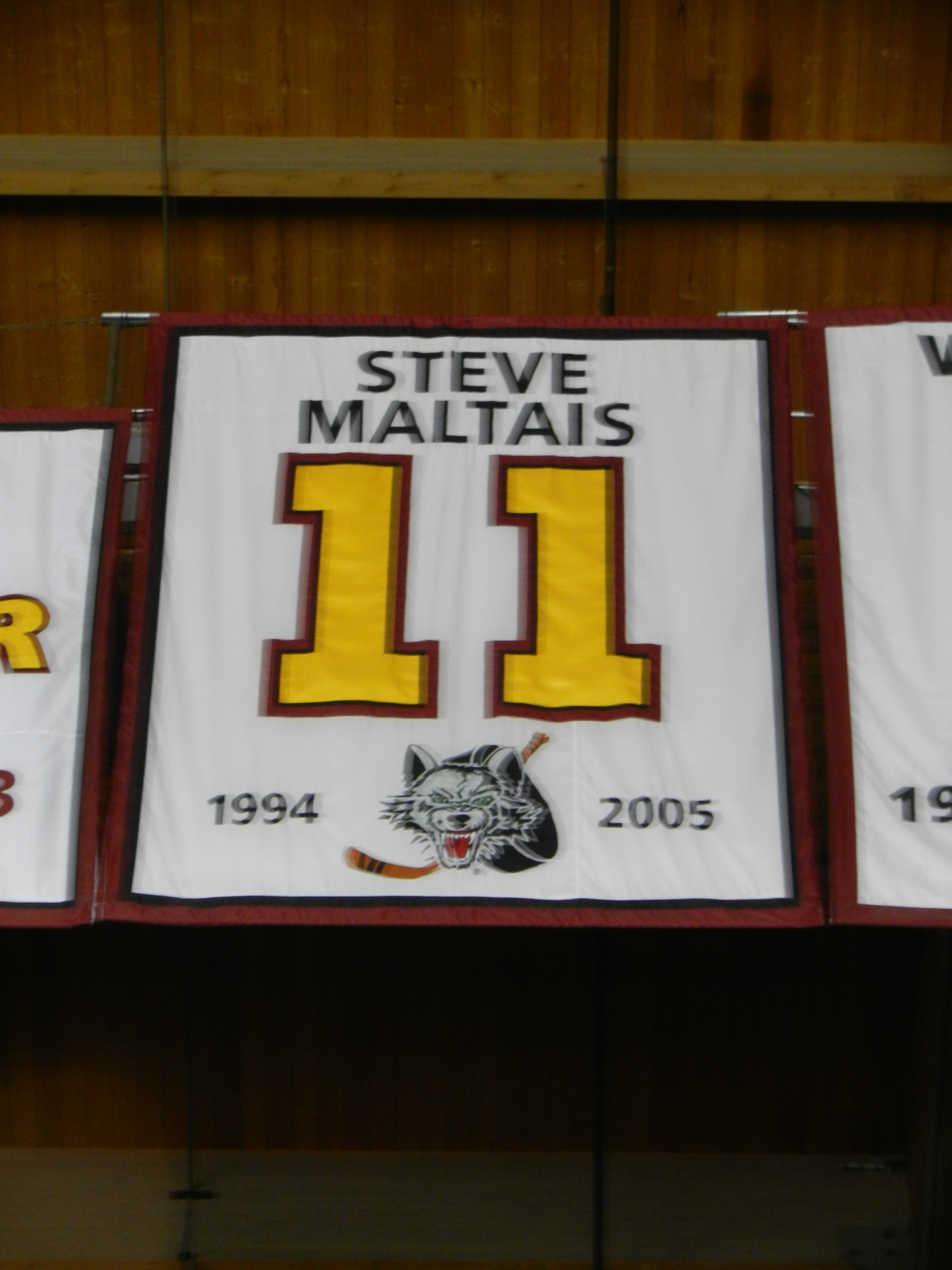
Maltais retired number banner

Maltais was born in Arvida, Quebec. As a youth, he played in the 1982 Quebec International Pee-Wee Hockey Tournament with a minor ice hockey team from Arvida.

Maltais played parts of six seasons in the National Hockey League with the Capitals, Minnesota North Stars, Tampa Bay Lightning, Detroit Red Wings, and Columbus Blue Jackets. He also attended the Pittsburgh Penguins training camp in 1997, but was released prior to the start of the regular season.

He is best known, however, for his long tenure with the top-level minor league Chicago Wolves. He joined the Wolves in 1994 when they were in the International Hockey League, and followed them into the American Hockey League. He retired in 2005, having played in all 11 of the team's seasons up to that point. He is still the Wolves all-time leading scorer. His 596 minor league goals is the eighth highest total in minor league history, and his 605 total goals (minor league and NHL) is good for 22nd all time.

His #11 was retired by the Wolves in a ceremony on April 15, 2006.

== Career statistics ==
Bold indicates led league

			Regular season					Playoffs
Season	Team	League	GP	G	A	Pts	PIM	GP	G	A	Pts	PIM
1985–86	Wexford Raiders	MetJHL	33	35	19	54	38	—	—	—	—	—
1986–87	Cornwall Royals	OHL	65	32	12	44	29	5	0	0	0	2
1987–88	Cornwall Royals	OHL	59	39	46	85	30	11	9	6	15	13
1988–89	Cornwall Royals	OHL	58	53	70	123	67	18	14	16	30	16
1988–89	Fort Wayne Komets	IHL	—	—	—	—	—	4	2	1	3	0
1989–90	Baltimore Skipjacks	AHL	67	29	37	66	54	12	6	10	16	6
1989–90	Washington Capitals	NHL	8	0	0	0	2	1	0	0	0	0
1990–91	Baltimore Skipjacks	AHL	73	36	43	79	97	6	1	4	5	10
1990–91	Washington Capitals	NHL	7	0	0	0	2	—	—	—	—	—
1991–92	Halifax Citadels	AHL	10	3	3	6	0	—	—	—	—	—
1991–92	Kalamazoo Wings	IHL	48	25	31	56	51	—	—	—	—	—
1991–92	Minnesota North Stars	NHL	12	2	1	3	2	—	—	—	—	—
1992–93	Atlanta Knights	IHL	16	14	10	24	22	—	—	—	—	—
1992–93	Tampa Bay Lightning	NHL	63	7	13	20	35	—	—	—	—	—
1993–94	Adirondack Red Wings	AHL	73	35	49	84	79	12	5	11	16	14
1993–94	Detroit Red Wings	NHL	4	0	1	1	0	—	—	—	—	—
1994–95	Chicago Wolves	IHL	79	57	41	98	145	3	1	1	2	0
1995–96	Chicago Wolves	IHL	81	56	66	122	161	9	7	7	14	20
1996–97	Chicago Wolves	IHL	81	60	54	114	62	4	2	0	2	4
1997–98	Chicago Wolves	IHL	82	46	57	103	120	22	8	11	19	28
1998–99	Chicago Wolves	IHL	82	56	44	100	164	10	4	6	10	2
1999–2000	Chicago Wolves	IHL	82	**44**	46	**90**	78	16	9	4	13	14
2000–01	Chicago Wolves	IHL	50	25	26	51	57	16	7	10	17	2
2000–01	Columbus Blue Jackets	NHL	26	0	3	3	12	—	—	—	—	—
2001–02	Chicago Wolves	AHL	67	31	32	63	62	25	12	10	22	22
2002–03	Chicago Wolves	AHL	79	30	**56**	**86**	86	9	3	5	8	12
2003–04	Chicago Wolves	AHL	76	31	33	64	67	10	5	4	9	16
2004–05	Chicago Wolves	AHL	80	18	42	60	59	18	5	7	12	6
IHL totals			601	383	404	757	860	84	40	40	80	70
AHL totals			527	213	295	508	504	92	37	51	88	86
NHL totals			120	9	18	27	53	1	0	0	0	0

== Awards ==
1999–2000: IHL Leo P. Lamoureux Memorial Trophy

2002-03: AHL John B. Sollenberger Trophy
