= Brent Regner =

Canadian ice hockey player (born 1989)

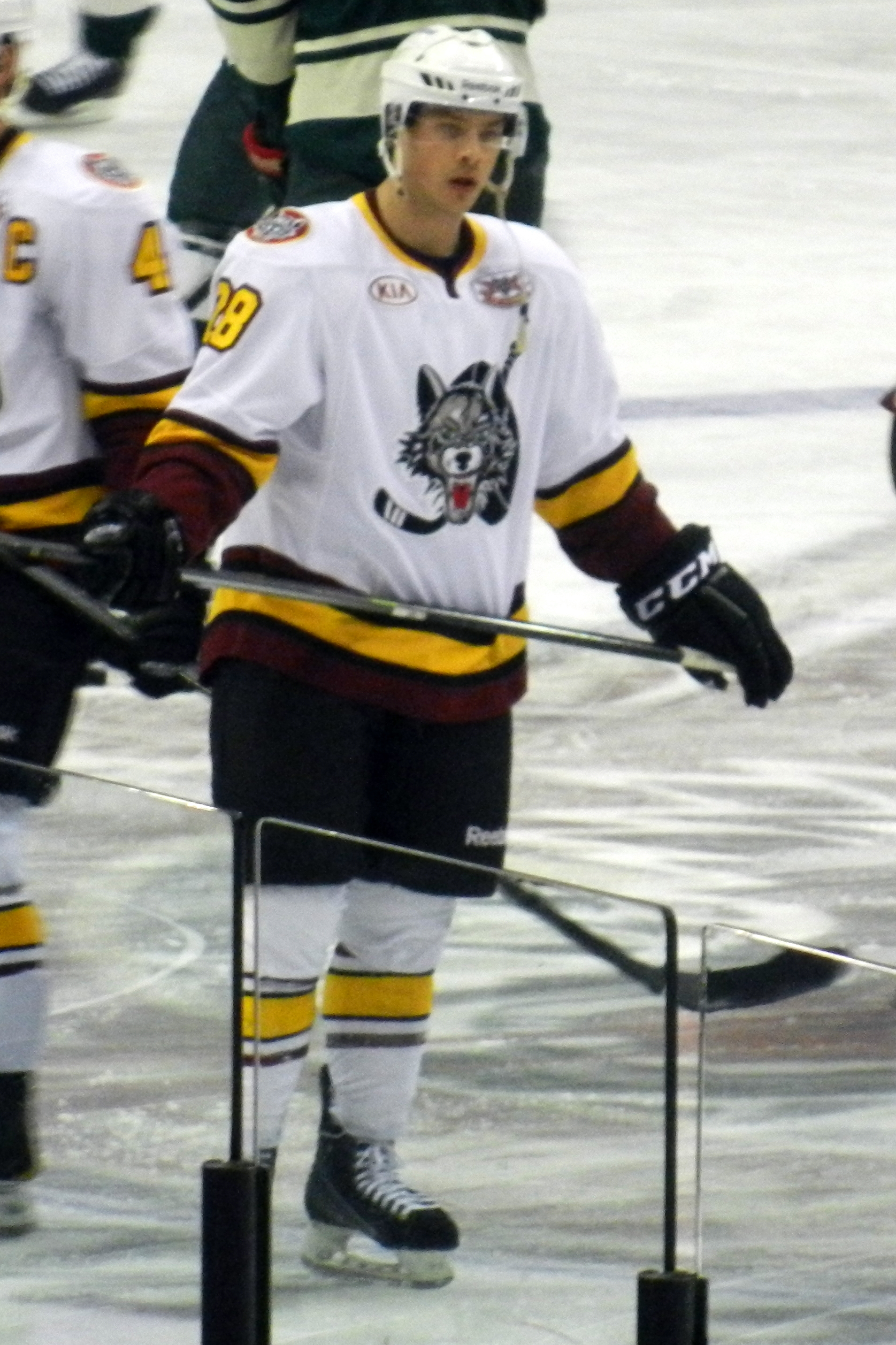
- Born: May 17, 1989 (age 37) Westlock, Alberta, Canada
- Height: 6 ft 0 in (183 cm)
- Weight: 190 lb (86 kg; 13 st 8 lb)
- Position: Defence
- Shot: Right
- Played for: Florida Panthers; EC Red Bull Salzburg
- NHL draft: 137th overall, 2008; Columbus Blue Jackets
- Playing career: 2009–2020

Brent Regner (born May 17, 1989) is a Canadian former professional ice hockey defenceman. He played in the National Hockey League (NHL) with the Florida Panthers. Regner was selected by the Columbus Blue Jackets in the 5th round (137th overall) of the 2008 NHL entry draft.

== Playing career ==
=== Junior ===
After completing two years of midget hockey with the Fort Saskatchewan Rangers, Regner debuted at the junior level in the 2005–06 season. He played one game with the Vancouver Giants of the Western Hockey League (WHL) while also appearing in five games with the Fort Saskatchewan Traders of the Alberta Junior Hockey League. The following season, he recorded 6 points in 64 games as a rookie with the Giants. Regner added 6 points in 22 playoff games, helping the Giants to the President's Cup Finals, where they were defeated by the Medicine Hat Tigers in seven games. Despite the loss, the Giants went on to the 2007 Memorial Cup, qualifying as the pre-determined tournament host team. In the national tournament, Vancouver and Medicine Hat met again in the final, with the Giants winning 3–1.

Playing in his second full WHL season, Regner improved to 47 points in 72 games. The Giants failed to defend their Memorial Cup title, losing in the second round of the WHL playoffs to the Spokane Chiefs. Regner added 10 points in 10 playoff games. In the off-season, he was selected in the fifth round, 137th overall, by the Columbus Blue Jackets in the 2008 NHL entry draft.

Returning for a third and final junior season in 2008–09, Regner recorded 67 points in 70 games, setting a Giants team record for most points by a defenceman in one year. He surpassed teammate Jonathon Blum's mark of 63 points, set the previous season. Regner's record was short-lived, as Kevin Connauton recorded 72 points in 2009–10.

=== Professional ===
After being signed to an entry-level contract by the Blue Jackets in the off-season, Regner turned professional with the team's American Hockey League (AHL) affiliate, the Syracuse Crunch, in 2009–10. He recorded 19 points over 56 games in his AHL rookie year. Regner switched teams the following season as the Blue Jackets changed their AHL affiliate to the Springfield Falcons in the summer. Maintaining a similar scoring pace, he registered 20 points in 50 games with the Falcons.

A free agent following the completion of his entry-level contract with the Blue Jackets, Regner was signed to a one-year American League contract with the Peoria Rivermen on September 17, 2012.

After the two seasons spent primarily within the St. Louis Blues AHL affiliations, Regner was signed to a one-year, two-way NHL contract with the Blues on July 1, 2014.

On July 1, 2015, Regner left the Blues as a free agent to sign a two-year, two-way contract with the Florida Panthers.

On July 1, 2017, Regner signed as a free agent from the Panthers to a one-year, two-way contract with the Dallas Stars.

After spending his first 9 professional seasons primarily within the AHL, Regner opted to embark on a European career, agreeing to a one-year contract with Austrian outfit, EC Red Bull Salzburg of the EBEL, on July 19, 2018.

== Career statistics ==
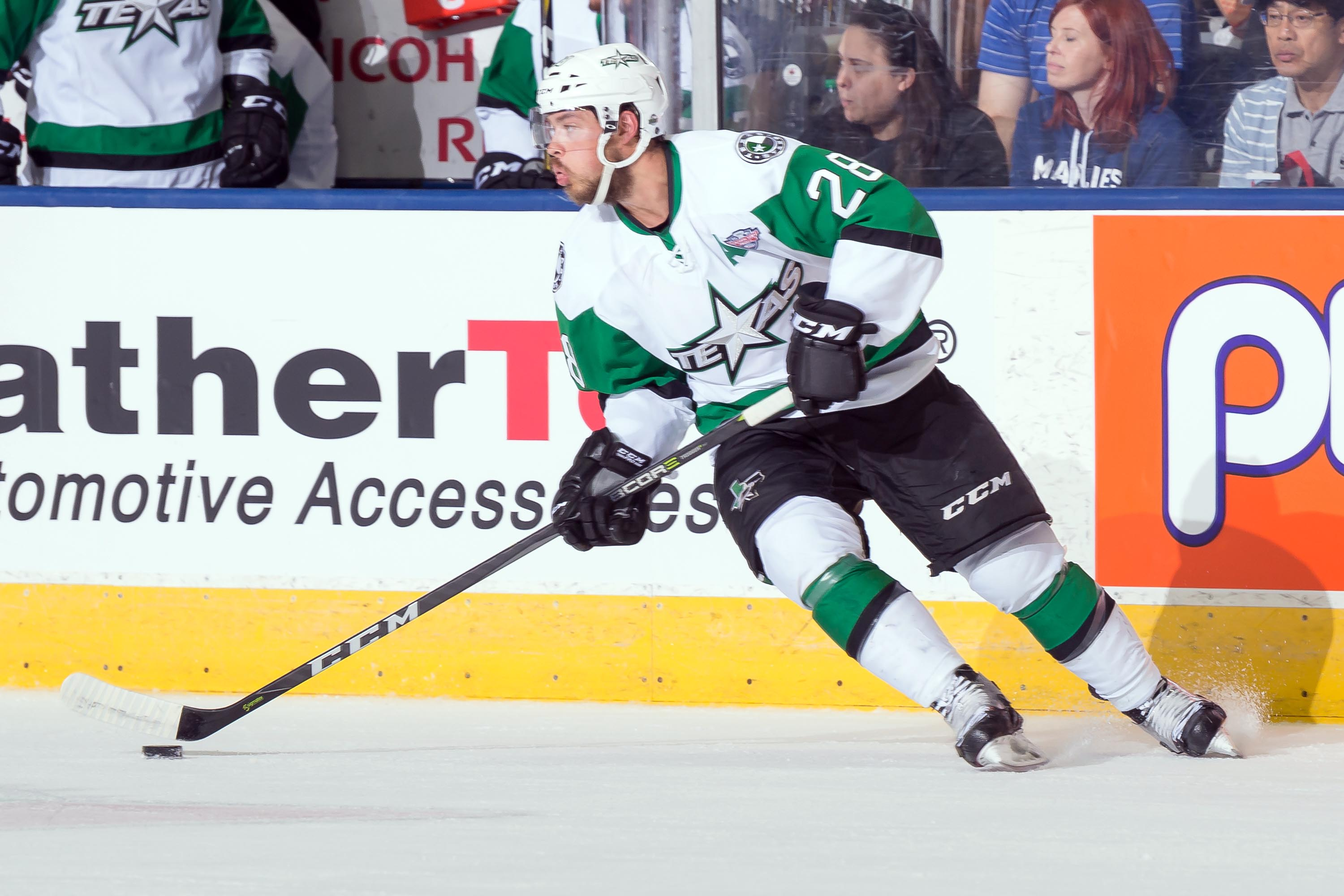
Regner during his tenure with the Texas Stars.

			Regular season					Playoffs
Season	Team	League	GP	G	A	Pts	PIM	GP	G	A	Pts	PIM
2004–05	Fort Saskatchewan Rangers	AMHL	36	2	13	15	24	—	—	—	—	—
2005–06	Fort Saskatchewan Rangers	AMHL	36	9	25	34	30	14	1	7	8	0
2005–06	Fort Saskatchewan Traders	AJHL	5	0	0	0	2	—	—	—	—	—
2005–06	Vancouver Giants	WHL	1	0	0	0	0	—	—	—	—	—
2006–07	Vancouver Giants	WHL	64	1	5	6	19	22	0	6	6	10
2007–08	Vancouver Giants	WHL	72	8	39	47	45	10	0	10	10	10
2008–09	Vancouver Giants	WHL	70	15	52	67	42	17	2	11	13	6
2009–10	Syracuse Crunch	AHL	50	4	16	20	22	—	—	—	—	—
2010–11	Springfield Falcons	AHL	56	6	13	19	17	—	—	—	—	—
2011–12	Springfield Falcons	AHL	75	2	29	31	26	—	—	—	—	—
2012–13	Peoria Rivermen	AHL	66	3	15	18	22	—	—	—	—	—
2012–13	Evansville Icemen	ECHL	2	1	0	1	0	—	—	—	—	—
2012–13	Chicago Wolves	AHL	7	0	1	1	7	—	—	—	—	—
2013–14	Chicago Wolves	AHL	63	3	21	24	36	9	2	4	6	6
2014–15	Chicago Wolves	AHL	71	6	23	29	29	3	1	1	2	0
2015–16	Portland Pirates	AHL	65	5	18	23	34	5	0	3	3	0
2015–16	Florida Panthers	NHL	7	0	0	0	4	—	—	—	—	—
2016–17	Springfield Thunderbirds	AHL	28	2	11	13	8	—	—	—	—	—
2017–18	Texas Stars	AHL	66	10	21	31	32	22	1	10	11	0
2018–19	EC Red Bull Salzburg	EBEL	44	11	23	34	16	8	2	2	4	0
2019–20	EC Red Bull Salzburg	EBEL	46	5	18	23	27	3	1	1	2	0
NHL totals			7	0	0	0	4	—	—	—	—	—

== Awards and honors ==
Award	Year
WHL
WHL West Second All-Star Team	2009
