= Kevin Dahl =

Canadian ice hockey player (born 1968)

- Born: December 30, 1968 (age 57) Regina, Saskatchewan, Canada
- Height: 5 ft 11 in (180 cm)
- Weight: 190 lb (86 kg; 13 st 8 lb)
- Position: Defence
- Shot: Right
- Played for: Calgary Flames; Phoenix Coyotes; Toronto Maple Leafs; Columbus Blue Jackets
- National team: Canada
- NHL draft: 230th overall, 1988; Montreal Canadiens
- Playing career: 1990–2004

Kevin Buck Dahl (born December 30, 1968) is a Canadian former professional ice hockey player who played in the NHL with the Calgary Flames, Phoenix Coyotes, Toronto Maple Leafs, and Columbus Blue Jackets. He played defense and shot right-handed.

== Playing career ==
Dahl was born in Regina, Saskatchewan. As a youth, he played in the 1981 Quebec International Pee-Wee Hockey Tournament with a minor ice hockey team from Burlington, Ontario. Dahl later played minor hockey in Thunder Bay, Ontario. He played Midget for the Thunder Bay Comets before signing with the Stratford Cullitons Jr.B. hockey club in 1985. Dahl was a tenth round pick (149th overall) in the 1985 OHL Priority Selection by the S.S. Marie Greyhounds, however, he decided to accept a scholarship to Bowling Green State (CCHA).

Dahl was drafted by the Montreal Canadiens in the 11th round, 230th overall in the 1988 NHL entry draft while playing for Bowling Green State University. After being drafted Dahl continued playing in college until 1990. For the 1990–1991 season Dahl turned pro and joined the Fredericton Canadiens of the AHL for part of the season. He also played for the Winston-Salem Thunderbirds of the ECHL. For the 1991–1992 season Dahl joined the Canadian National team for most of the season and also represented Canada in the 1992 Winter Olympics, scoring 2 goals in 8 games.

Dahl signed as a free agent with the Calgary Flames in 1991 and joined the team for the 1992–1993 season after his time with the Canadian National team. That year he appeared in a career high 61 games with the Flames. Dahl spent the next 3 seasons with the Flames, scoring a career high 12 points during the lockout shortened 1994–1995 season.

Dahl signed with the Phoenix Coyotes in 1996. He would play only two games with the Coyotes during the 1996–1997 season however, spending the majority of the year in the minors with the Las Vegas Thunder. The following year, he resigned with the Flames and played 19 games with the team during the 1997–1998 season, spending most of the year with the Chicago Wolves. He was signed by the St. Louis Blues in 1998 but released a month later and signed by the Toronto Maple Leafs. He appeared in 3 games with the Maple Leafs for the 1998–1999 season, once again spending most of the year with the Chicago Wolves.

Dahl spent the majority of the next two seasons with the Wolves. He was signed by the Columbus Blue Jackets and played briefly during their inaugural season (2000–2001), appearing in four games. He then played three years with the Nuernberg Ice Tigers of the DEL in Germany before retiring in 2004.

== Career statistics ==
=== Regular season and playoffs ===
			Regular season					Playoffs
Season	Team	League	GP	G	A	Pts	PIM	GP	G	A	Pts	PIM
1985–86	Stratford Cullitons	MWJHL	28	9	15	24	99	—	—	—	—	—
1986–87	Bowling Green State	CCHA	32	2	6	8	54	—	—	—	—	—
1987–88	Bowling Green State	CCHA	44	2	23	25	78	—	—	—	—	—
1988–89	Bowling Green State	CCHA	44	9	26	35	51	—	—	—	—	—
1989–90	Bowling Green State	CCHA	43	8	22	30	74	—	—	—	—	—
1990–91	Fredericton Canadiens	AHL	32	1	15	16	45	9	0	1	1	11
1990–91	Winston-Salem Icehawks	ECHL	36	7	17	24	58	—	—	—	—	—
1991–92	Canada	Intl	45	2	15	17	44	—	—	—	—	—
1991–92	Salt Lake Golden Eagles	IHL	13	0	2	2	12	5	0	0	0	13
1992–93	Calgary Flames	NHL	61	2	9	11	56	6	0	2	2	8
1993–94	Calgary Flames	NHL	33	0	3	3	23	6	0	0	0	4
1993–94	Saint John Flames	AHL	2	0	0	0	0	—	—	—	—	—
1994–95	Calgary Flames	NHL	34	4	8	12	38	3	0	0	0	0
1995–96	Calgary Flames	NHL	32	1	1	2	26	1	0	0	0	0
1995–96	Saint John Flames	AHL	23	4	11	15	37	—	—	—	—	—
1996–97	Phoenix Coyotes	NHL	2	0	0	0	0	—	—	—	—	—
1996–97	Las Vegas Thunder	IHL	73	10	21	31	101	3	0	0	0	2
1997–98	Calgary Flames	NHL	19	0	1	1	6	—	—	—	—	—
1997–98	Chicago Wolves	IHL	45	8	9	17	61	20	1	8	9	32
1998–99	Toronto Maple Leafs	NHL	3	0	0	0	2	—	—	—	—	—
1998–99	Chicago Wolves	IHL	34	3	6	9	61	10	2	3	5	8
1999–2000	Chicago Wolves	IHL	27	1	2	3	44	3	0	1	1	2
2000–01	Columbus Blue Jackets	NHL	4	0	0	0	2	—	—	—	—	—
2000–01	Chicago Wolves	IHL	72	2	6	8	63	16	2	2	4	16
2001–02	Nürnberg Ice Tigers	DEL	48	2	12	14	95	4	0	0	0	6
2002–03	Nürnberg Ice Tigers	DEL	38	2	10	12	56	5	0	2	2	8
2003–04	Nürnberg Ice Tigers	DEL	40	4	12	16	84	6	0	1	1	8
IHL totals			264	24	46	70	342	57	5	14	19	73
NHL totals			188	7	22	29	153	16	0	2	2	12
DEL totals			126	8	34	42	235	15	0	3	3	22

=== International ===
Year	Team	Event	GP	G	A	Pts	PIM
1992	Canada	OG	8	2	0	2	6
