= 1989 Stanley Cup playoffs =

Ice hockey playoffs

Tournament details
- Dates: April 5–May 25, 1989
- Teams: 16
- Defending champions: Edmonton Oilers

Final positions
- Champions: Calgary Flames
- Runners-up: Montreal Canadiens

Tournament statistics
- Scoring leader(s): Al MacInnis (Flames) (31 points)

Awards
- MVP: Al MacInnis (Flames)

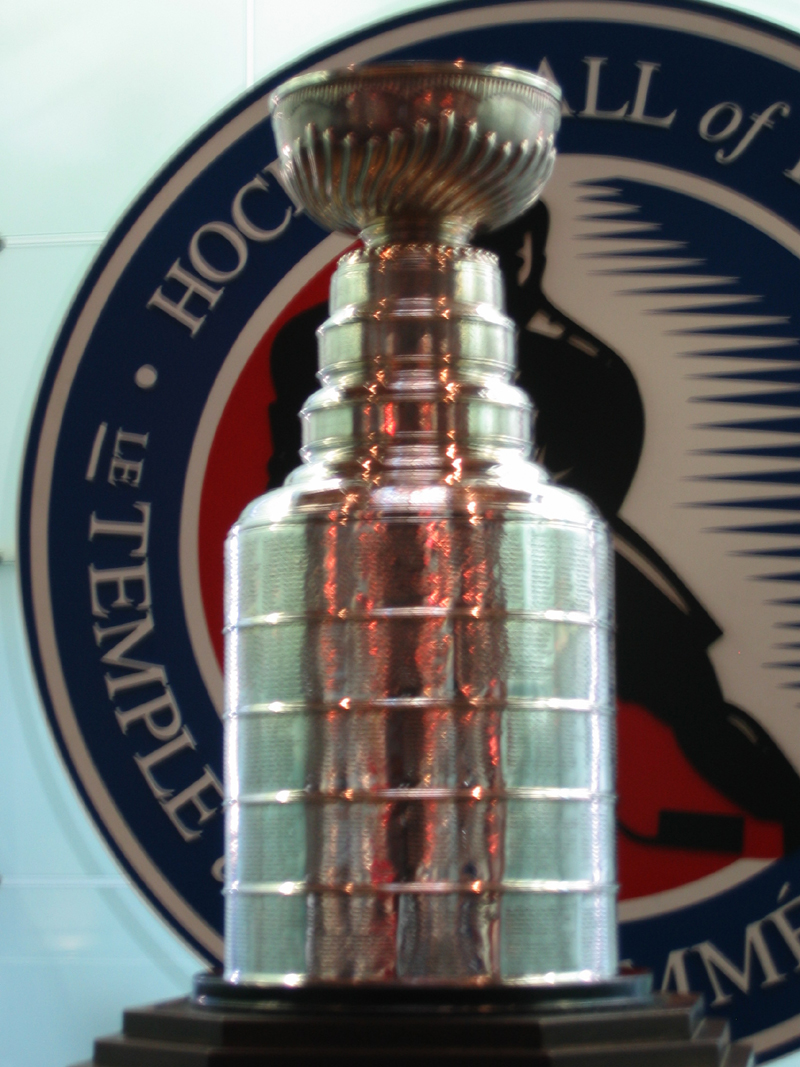
The Stanley Cup

The 1989 Stanley Cup playoffs, the playoff tournament of the National Hockey League (NHL) began on April 5, after the conclusion of the 1988–89 NHL season. This was the final year that all of the Division Semifinals began with teams playing the first four games in a span of five days. The playoffs concluded on May 25 with the champion Calgary Flames defeating the Montreal Canadiens 4–2 to win the Stanley Cup Final four games to two.

It remains the last time that the Cup Final was contested between two Canadian hockey teams. Montreal finished the regular season with 115 points, only two behind the league leader Calgary. They had last faced each other in 1986, with Montreal winning in five games. Calgary was only the second opposing team in NHL history to win a Stanley Cup at the Montreal Forum (the New York Rangers defeated the Montreal Maroons in 1928) and the first and only to do so against the Canadiens. Flames defenceman Al MacInnis won the Conn Smythe Trophy as playoff MVP, while Lanny McDonald, who ended the regular season with exactly 500 goals, got his name on the Cup in his last NHL game. Flames co-owner Sonia Scurfield became the first Canadian woman to have her name inscribed on the Stanley Cup.

Wayne Gretzky and the Los Angeles Kings met the defending champion Oilers in the first round. The Kings defeated the defending Stanley Cup champions after falling behind 3–1. However, they were swept by the eventual champion Calgary Flames in four games the next round.

Philadelphia Flyers goaltender Ron Hextall became the first goaltender to actually score a goal in the playoffs, a shorthanded, empty-net goal in Game 5 of the Patrick Division Semifinal against the Washington Capitals. One round later, Mario Lemieux equaled four NHL-records (most goals in a game, most goals in a period, most points in a game, and most points in a period) by scoring five goals and eight points in a 10–7 Pittsburgh win in game five of the Patrick Division Finals. Hextall then made headlines in the Wales Conference Finals, attacking Montreal's Chris Chelios in the late stages of Game 6 as retribution for Chelios' unpenalized hit on Flyers forward Brian Propp in game one. Hextall received a 12-game suspension at the start of the 1989–90 season for his actions.

Former Flyers head coach Mike Keenan led Chicago to the Campbell Conference finals in his first year behind the bench. The Blackhawks had 66 points, the fewest points of any playoff team this season, yet they upset first place Detroit and then St. Louis before losing to Calgary.

== Playoff seeds ==
The top four teams in each division qualified for the playoffs, as follows:

=== Prince of Wales Conference ===
==== Adams Division ====
1. Montreal Canadiens, Adams Division champions, Prince of Wales Conference regular season champions – 115 points
2. Boston Bruins – 88 points
3. Buffalo Sabres – 83 points
4. Hartford Whalers – 79 points

==== Patrick Division ====
1. Washington Capitals, Patrick Division champions – 92 points
2. Pittsburgh Penguins – 87 points
3. New York Rangers – 82 points
4. Philadelphia Flyers – 80 points

=== Clarence Campbell Conference ===
==== Norris Division ====
1. Detroit Red Wings, Norris Division champions – 80 points
2. St. Louis Blues – 78 points
3. Minnesota North Stars – 70 points
4. Chicago Blackhawks – 66 points

==== Smythe Division ====
1. Calgary Flames, Smythe Division champions, Clarence Campbell Conference regular season champions, Presidents' Trophy winners – 117 points
2. Los Angeles Kings – 91 points
3. Edmonton Oilers – 84 points
4. Vancouver Canucks – 74 points

== Playoff bracket ==
In the division semifinals, the fourth seeded team in each division played against the division winner from their division. The other series matched the second and third place teams from the divisions. The two winning teams from each division's semifinals then met in the division finals. The two division winners of each conference then played in the conference finals. The two conference winners then advanced to the Stanley Cup Final.

In each round, teams competed in a best-of-seven series following a 2–2–1–1–1 format (scores in the bracket indicate the number of games won in each best-of-seven series). Home ice advantage was awarded to the team that had the better regular season record, and played at home for games one and two (and games five and seven, if necessary); the other team then played at home for games three and four (and game six, if necessary).

Division semifinals	Division finals
A1	Montreal	4
A4	Hartford	0
A1	Montreal	4
A2	Boston	1
A2	Boston	4
A3	Buffalo	1
Prince of Wales Conference
P1	Washington	2
P4	Philadelphia	4
P4	Philadelphia	4
P2	Pittsburgh	3
P2	Pittsburgh	4
P3	NY Rangers	0
N1	Detroit	2
N4	Chicago	4
N4	Chicago	4
N2	St. Louis	1
N2	St. Louis	4
N3	Minnesota	1
Clarence Campbell Conference
S1	Calgary	4
S4	Vancouver	3
S1	Calgary	4
S2	Los Angeles	0
S2	Los Angeles	4
S3	Edmonton	3

Conference finals
A1	Montreal	4
P4	Philadelphia	2
N4	Chicago	1
S1	Calgary	4

Stanley Cup Final
A1	Montreal	2
S1	Calgary	4

== Division semifinals ==
=== Prince of Wales Conference ===
==== (A1) Montreal Canadiens vs. (A4) Hartford Whalers ====
This was the fourth playoff series meeting between these two teams, and were meeting for the second straight year. Montreal won all three previous meetings, including last year's Adams Division Semifinals in six games.

April 5	Hartford Whalers	2–6	Montreal Canadiens	Montreal Forum	Recap
Ray Ferraro (1) – 14:59		First period	12:09 – pp – Mike Keane (1); 16:24 – Bobby Smith (1)
Scott Young (1) – 16:55		Second period	03:59 – sh – Ryan Walter (1)
No scoring		Third period	06:25 – Mike McPhee (1); 08:02 – pp – Mats Naslund (1); 17:50 – Brian Skrudland (1)
Kay Whitmore 27 saves / 33 shots		Goalie stats	Patrick Roy 25 saves / 27 shots

April 6	Hartford Whalers	2–3	Montreal Canadiens	Montreal Forum	Recap
No scoring		First period	No scoring
No scoring		Second period	00:36 – Brian Skrudland (2); 17:02 – pp – Bobby Smith (2); 18:25 – Mike McPhee (2)
Scott Young (2) – 07:03; Paul MacDermid (1) – 14:10		Third period	No scoring
Peter Sidorkiewicz 14 saves / 17 shots		Goalie stats	Patrick Roy 27 saves / 29 shots

April 8	Montreal Canadiens	5–4	OT	Hartford Whalers	Hartford Civic Center	Recap
No scoring		First period		17:00 – pp – Grant Jennings (1)
Bobby Smith (3) – 10:47		Second period		00:56 – Kevin Dineen (1)
Russ Courtnall (1) – 04:10; Donald Dufresne (1) – 04:38; Guy Carbonneau (1) – 15:28		Third period		12:52 – sh – Dean Evason (1); 15:54 – Brad Shaw (1)
Stephane Richer (1) – 05:01		First overtime period		No scoring
Brian Hayward 23 saves / 27 shots		Goalie stats		Peter Sidorkiewicz 23 saves / 28 shots

April 9	Montreal Canadiens	4–3	OT	Hartford Whalers	Hartford Civic Center	Recap
No scoring		First period		19:04 – Ray Ferraro (2)
Mats Naslund (2) – 01:59; Stephane Richer (2) – 07:08		Second period		No scoring
Bobby Smith (4) – pp – 02:56		Third period		05:29 – Dave Babych (1); 14:55 – Brian Lawton (1)
Russ Courtnall (2) – 15:12		First overtime period		No scoring
Patrick Roy 43 saves / 46 shots		Goalie stats		Kay Whitmore 36 saves / 40 shots

Montreal won series 4–0

==== (A2) Boston Bruins vs. (A3) Buffalo Sabres ====
This was the fourth playoff series meeting between these two teams, and were meeting for the second straight year. Boston won all three previous meetings, including last year's Adams Division Semifinals in six games.

April 5	Buffalo Sabres	6–0	Boston Bruins	Boston Garden	Recap
Mike Foligno (1) – pp – 05:54; Rick Vaive (1) – pp – 13:42		First period	No scoring
Scott Arniel (1) – sh – 06:38; Pierre Turgeon (1) – pp – 17:41; Mike Ramsey (1) – pp – 18:17		Second period	No scoring
Mike Foligno (2) – sh – 12:51		Third period	No scoring
Jacques Cloutier 29 saves / 29 shots		Goalie stats	Rejean Lemelin 13 saves / 19 shots

April 6	Buffalo Sabres	3–5	Boston Bruins	Boston Garden	Recap
No scoring		First period	No scoring
Mike Foligno (3) – 01:20; Pierre Turgeon (2) – 03:08; Pierre Turgeon (3) – 03:35		Second period	06:24 – pp – Cam Neely (1); 19:25 – sh – Greg Johnston (1)
No scoring		Third period	01:08 – Craig Janney (1); 01:56 – pp – Bobby Carpenter (1); 15:42 – Ray Neufeld (1)
Clint Malarchuk 27 saves / 32 shots		Goalie stats	Andy Moog 14 saves / 17 shots

April 8	Boston Bruins	4–2	Buffalo Sabres	Buffalo Memorial Auditorium	Recap
Randy Burridge (1) – 16:53		First period	No scoring
No scoring		Second period	No scoring
Cam Neely (2) – 05:45; Cam Neely (3) – pp – 14:54; Bob Sweeney (1) – en – 19:59		Third period	08:00 – pp – Rick Vaive (2); 10:27 – Phil Housley (1)
Andy Moog 36 saves / 38 shots		Goalie stats	Jacques Cloutier 24 saves / 27 shots

April 9	Boston Bruins	3–2	Buffalo Sabres	Buffalo Memorial Auditorium	Recap
Randy Burridge (2) – pp – 07:07		First period	17:06 – pp – Doug Bodger (1)
Craig Janney (2) – 06:27; Cam Neely (4) – 15:32		Second period	03:18 – Mark Napier (1)
No scoring		Third period	No scoring
Rejean Lemelin 22 saves / 24 shots		Goalie stats	Jacques Cloutier 18 saves / 21 shots

April 11	Buffalo Sabres	1–4	Boston Bruins	Boston Garden	Recap
No scoring		First period	No scoring
No scoring		Second period	08:39 – sh – Randy Burridge (3); 11:26 – Ray Neufeld (2); 13:04 – pp – Cam Neely (5)
Grant Ledyard (1) – 05:23		Third period	14:32 – Craig Janney (3)
Jacques Cloutier 26 saves / 30 shots		Goalie stats	Andy Moog 22 saves / 23 shots

Boston won series 4–1

==== (P1) Washington Capitals vs. (P4) Philadelphia Flyers ====
This was the second straight and third overall playoff series between these two teams. Washington won both prior meetings, including last year's Patrick Division Semifinals in seven games.

Rick Tocchet scored two goals in game six, including the game-winner with 3:18 left in the third period, to win the series for the Flyers.

April 5	Philadelphia Flyers	2–3	Washington Capitals	Capital Centre	Recap
Brian Propp (1) – 07:49; Tim Kerr (1) – pp – 11:52		First period	14:49 – pp – Geoff Courtnall (1)
No scoring		Second period	12:24 – Michal Pivonka (1); 13:59 – Lou Franceschetti (1)
No scoring		Third period	No scoring
Ron Hextall 33 saves / 36 shots		Goalie stats	Pete Peeters 27 saves / 29 shots

April 6	Philadelphia Flyers	3–2	Washington Capitals	Capital Centre	Recap
No scoring		First period	No scoring
No scoring		Second period	19:59 – pp – Dino Ciccarelli (1)
Keith Acton (1) – 07:08; Brian Propp (2) – pp – 11:25; Brian Propp (3) – pp – 19:09		Third period	02:40 – Geoff Courtnall (2)
Ron Hextall 19 saves / 21 shots		Goalie stats	Pete Peeters 23 saves / 26 shots

April 8	Washington Capitals	4–3	OT	Philadelphia Flyers	Spectrum	Recap
Bob Rouse (1) – 08:16		First period		05:19 – pp – Rick Tocchet (1)
Stephen Leach (1) – pp – 16:15		Second period		03:47 – Scott Mellanby (1)
Bengt-Ake Gustafsson (1) – pp – 12:15		Third period		05:30 – Brian Propp (4)
Kelly Miller (1) – 00:51		First overtime period		No scoring
Pete Peeters 21 saves / 24 shots		Goalie stats		Ron Hextall 40 saves / 44 shots

April 9	Washington Capitals	2–5	Philadelphia Flyers	Spectrum	Recap
No scoring		First period	No scoring
No scoring		Second period	03:41 – pp – Tim Kerr (2); 08:54 – Dave Poulin (1); 12:01 – Gord Murphy (1); 19:00 – pp – Rick Tocchet (2)
Dino Ciccarelli (2) – pp – 10:03; Michal Pivonka (2) – sh – 11:32		Third period	02:11 – Scott Mellanby (2)
Pete Peeters 26 saves / 31 shots		Goalie stats	Ron Hextall 30 saves / 32 shots

April 11	Philadelphia Flyers	8–5	Washington Capitals	Capital Centre	Recap
Rick Tocchet (3) – 03:32; Mike Bullard (1) – 09:35		First period	03:11 – Bob Rouse (2); 15:53 – pp – Dave Christian (1)
Tim Kerr (3) – 08:57; Tim Kerr (4) – pp – 14:32		Second period	04:41 – Michal Pivonka (3); 12:31 – pp – Dino Ciccarelli (3)
Brian Propp (5) – 08:03; Pelle Eklund (1) – pp – 13:52; Kjell Samuelsson (1) – 16:32; Ron Hextall (1) – sh-en – 18:58		Third period	05:35 – pp – Calle Johansson (1)
Ron Hextall 29 saves / 34 shots		Goalie stats	Pete Peeters 18 saves / 25 shots

April 13	Washington Capitals	3–4	Philadelphia Flyers	Spectrum	Recap
Kevin Hatcher (1) – pp – 07:02		First period	No scoring
No scoring		Second period	05:21 – sh – Brian Propp (6); 15:42 – pp – Gord Murphy (2)
Scott Stevens (1) – 03:28; Bengt-Ake Gustafsson (2) – 13:13		Third period	07:27 – Rick Tocchet (4); 16:42 – Rick Tocchet (5)
Pete Peeters 24 saves / 28 shots		Goalie stats	Ron Hextall 31 saves / 34 shots

Philadelphia won series 4–2

==== (P2) Pittsburgh Penguins vs. (P3) New York Rangers ====
This was the first playoff series between these two teams.

April 5	New York Rangers	1–3	Pittsburgh Penguins	Civic Arena	Recap
Tomas Sandstrom (1) – pp – 19:34		First period	12:34 – pp – Paul Coffey (1)
No Scoring		Second period	No Scoring
No Scoring		Third period	10:21 – pp – Paul Coffey (2); 13:16 – Dan Quinn (1)
Bob Froese 35 saves / 38 shots		Goalie stats	Tom Barrasso 26 saves / 27 shots

April 6	New York Rangers	4–7	Pittsburgh Penguins	Civic Arena	Recap
Guy Lafleur (1) – pp – 06:36; Brian Leetch (1) – pp – 14:29		First period	03:06 – Kevin Stevens (1); 03:35 – Rob Brown (1); 04:37 – Jock Callander (1); 07:51 – Phil Bourque (1); 12:48 – Randy Cunneyworth (1)
No scoring		Second period	13:52 – pp – Zarley Zalapski (1)
John Ogrodnick (1) – pp – 06:15; Carey Wilson (1) – 07:54		Third period	18:54 – en – Mario Lemieux (1)
Bob Froese 8 saves / 13 shots John Vanbiesbrouck 23 saves / 24 shots		Goalie stats	Tom Barrasso 32 saves / 36 shots

April 8	Pittsburgh Penguins	5–3	New York Rangers	Madison Square Garden	Recap
Mario Lemieux (2) – pp – 07:24; John Cullen (1) – 15:25		First period	08:28 – Tony Granato (1)
Kevin Stevens (2) – 09:06; Dan Quinn (2) – pp – 18:45		Second period	No scoring
Dan Quinn (3) – 04:25		Third period	02:24 – John Ogrodnick (2); 13:23 – pp – Tomas Sandstrom (2)
Tom Barrasso 43 saves / 46 shots		Goalie stats	John Vanbiesbrouck 25 saves / 30 shots

April 9	Pittsburgh Penguins	4–3	New York Rangers	Madison Square Garden	Recap
Mario Lemieux (3) – pp – 07:27; Phil Bourque (2) – 07:53; Phil Bourque (3) – 11:03		First period	No scoring
Rob Brown (2) – 14:33		Second period	02:18 – Tomas Sandstrom (3)
No scoring		Third period	06:15 – Brian Leetch (2); 19:49 – pp – Brian Leetch (3)
Tom Barrasso 46 saves / 49 shots		Goalie stats	Mike Richter 26 saves / 30 shots

Pittsburgh won series 4–0

=== Clarence Campbell Conference ===
==== (N1) Detroit Red Wings vs. (N4) Chicago Blackhawks ====
This was the 12th playoff series between these two teams. Chicago lead the all-time meetings 6–5. Detroit won their most recent meeting in a four-game sweep in the 1987 Norris Division Semifinals.

April 5	Chicago Blackhawks	2–3	Detroit Red Wings	Joe Louis Arena	Recap
No scoring		First period	15:15 – Petr Klima (1); 18:09 – Dave Barr (1)
Adam Creighton (1) – pp – 12:00		Second period	16:20 – Dave Barr (2)
Denis Savard (1) – 09:30		Third period	No scoring
Alain Chevrier 27 saves / 30 shots		Goalie stats	Greg Stefan 21 saves / 23 shots

April 6	Chicago Blackhawks	5–4	OT	Detroit Red Wings	Joe Louis Arena	Recap
Dirk Graham (1) – pp – 08:49; Denis Savard (2) – 09:59		First period		06:09 – Steve Yzerman (1); 11:48 – pp – Steve Yzerman (2)
Adam Creighton (2) – pp – 05:08; Wayne Presley (1) – sh – 13:50		Second period		No scoring
No scoring		Third period		07:01 – Steve Yzerman (3); 17:31 – Steve Chiasson (1)
Duane Sutter (1) – 14:36		First overtime period		No scoring
Alain Chevrier 39 saves / 43 shots		Goalie stats		Greg Stefan 38 saves / 43 shots

April 8	Detroit Red Wings	2–4	Chicago Blackhawks	Chicago Stadium	Recap
Dave Barr (3) – pp – 04:46		First period	No scoring
Steve Chiasson (2) – pp – 02:21		Second period	01:27 – Adam Creighton (3); 17:07 – pp – Doug Wilson (1)
No scoring		Third period	01:34 – pp – Denis Savard (3); 03:45 – Troy Murray (1)
Glen Hanlon 31 saves / 35 shots		Goalie stats	Alain Chevrier 14 saves / 16 shots

April 9	Detroit Red Wings	2–3	Chicago Blackhawks	Chicago Stadium	Recap
No scoring		First period	12:09 – pp – Bob Murray (1)
Steve Yzerman (4) – pp – 02:16		Second period	00:52 – Greg Gilbert (1)
Shawn Burr (1) – 15:00		Third period	10:16 – Duane Sutter (2)
Greg Stefan 30 saves / 33 shots		Goalie stats	Alain Chevrier 36 saves / 38 shots

April 11	Chicago Blackhawks	4–6	Detroit Red Wings	Joe Louis Arena	Recap
Adam Creighton (4) – pp – 12:34; Steve Larmer (1) – 16:44		First period	00:52 – Steve Yzerman (5); 06:00 – Gerard Gallant (1); 17:26 – Paul MacLean (1)
Wayne Presley (2) – sh – 04:26		Second period	No scoring
Steve Konroyd (1) – sh – 01:05		Third period	07:23 – pp – Petr Klima (2); 08:22 – John Chabot (1); 19:29 – Torrie Robertson (1)
Alain Chevrier 23 saves / 29 shots		Goalie stats	Greg Stefan 25 saves / 29 shots

April 13	Detroit Red Wings	1–7	Chicago Blackhawks	Chicago Stadium	Recap
Lee Norwood (1) – pp – 06:21		First period	18:39 – pp – Steve Larmer (2)
No scoring		Second period	07:03 – Steve Larmer (3); 07:29 – Wayne Presley (3); 11:49 – pp – Troy Murray (2)
No scoring		Third period	07:29 – pp – Wayne Presley (4); 11:05 – sh – Wayne Presley (5); 18:49 – Denis Savard (4)
Greg Stefan 19 saves / 23 shots Glen Hanlon 9 saves / 12 shots		Goalie stats	Alain Chevrier 18 saves / 19 shots

Chicago won series 4–2

==== (N2) St. Louis Blues vs. (N3) Minnesota North Stars ====
This was the eighth playoff series meeting between these two teams. St. Louis won four of the prior seven meetings. The most recent meeting was won by St. Louis 3–2 in the 1986 Norris Division Semifinals.

In game four, Don Barber scored the game-winning goal with seven seconds left to complete the Stars' comeback from a two-goal deficit and force game five.

April 5	Minnesota North Stars	3–4	OT	St. Louis Blues	St. Louis Arena	Recap
Bob Brooke (1) – 16:16		First period		No scoring
Bob Brooke (2) – 15:10		Second period		06:41 – Gordie Roberts (1); 18:45 – pp – Cliff Ronning (1)
Bob Brooke (3) – 17:25		Third period		02:58 – Peter Zezel (1)
No scoring		First overtime period		11:55 – Brett Hull (1)
Jon Casey 42 saves / 46 shots		Goalie stats		Greg Millen 34 saves / 37 shots

April 6	Minnesota North Stars	3–4	OT	St. Louis Blues	St. Louis Arena	Recap
Stew Gavin (1) – 01:36; Brian Bellows (1) – pp – 10:20; Neal Broten (1) – pp – 16:19		First period		12:56 – pp – Brett Hull (2)
No scoring		Second period		13:17 – Rick Meagher (1)
No scoring		Third period		18:16 – Paul Cavallini (1)
No scoring		First overtime period		05:30 – Rick Meagher (2)
Kari Takko 28 saves / 32 shots		Goalie stats		Greg Millen 29 saves / 32 shots

April 8	St. Louis Blues	5–3	Minnesota North Stars	Met Center	Recap
Peter Zezel (2) – 04:44; Doug Evans (1) – 06:21; Brett Hull (3) – 12:14		First period	No scoring
Brett Hull (4) – 06:56		Second period	04:04 – pp – Brian Bellows (2); 04:50 – Stew Gavin (2)
Greg Paslawski (1) – pp – 01:06		Third period	08:33 – sh – Neal Broten (2)
Greg Millen 28 saves / 31 shots		Goalie stats	Jon Casey 11 saves / 15 shots Kari Takko 4 saves / 5 shots

April 9	St. Louis Blues	4–5	Minnesota North Stars	Met Center	Recap
Peter Zezel (3) – sh – 03:19		First period	No scoring
Bernie Federko (1) – pp – 01:04		Second period	15:28 – Stew Gavin (3)
Bernie Federko (2) – 02:28; Herb Raglan (1) – 12:02		Third period	02:36 – Perry Berezan (1); 06:24 – Dusan Pasek (1); 16:45 – Marc Habscheid (1); 19:53 – Don Barber (1)
Greg Millen 22 saves / 27 shots		Goalie stats	Jon Casey 26 saves / 30 shots

April 11	Minnesota North Stars	1–6	St. Louis Blues	St. Louis Arena	Recap
No scoring		First period	No scoring
Frantisek Musil (1) – 06:40		Second period	07:07 – Peter Zezel (4); 08:47 – pp – Peter Zezel (5); 09:48 – Rod Brind'Amour (1); 16:01 – Rick Meagher (3)
No scoring		Third period	01:50 – Sergio Momesso (1); 06:10 – Peter Zezel (6)
Jon Casey 26 saves / 30 shots Kari Takko 16 saves / 18 shots		Goalie stats	Greg Millen 23 saves / 24 shots

St. Louis won series 4–1

==== (S1) Calgary Flames vs. (S4) Vancouver Canucks ====
This was the fourth playoff series meeting between these two teams. Calgary won two of the previous three meetings, including their most recent meeting 3–1 in the 1984 Smythe Division Semifinals.

Calgary defeated Vancouver in seven games. This was the first of three consecutive series between these two teams that ended in overtime of game seven (with the winner of all three series making it to the Stanley Cup Final). The seventh game went into overtime with both teams having great chances to win the game. The best of these chances was a breakaway for Canucks' captain Stan Smyl who was stopped by Calgary goaltender Mike Vernon. Joel Otto scored the series winner at 19:21 of the first overtime after Jim Peplinski banked it in off Otto's skate to send the Flames into the Smythe Division Final.

April 5	Vancouver Canucks	4–3	OT	Calgary Flames	Olympic Saddledome	Recap
Greg Adams (1) – 06:21		First period		08:24 – Mark Hunter (1)
Robert Nordmark (1) – 04:20		Second period		01:59 – pp – Joe Mullen (1); 15:30 – Jamie Macoun (1)
Petri Skriko (1) – 08:41		Third period		No scoring
Paul Reinhart (1) – 02:47		First overtime period		No scoring
Kirk McLean 43 saves / 46 shots		Goalie stats		Mike Vernon 27 saves / 31 shots

April 6	Vancouver Canucks	2–5	Calgary Flames	Olympic Saddledome	Recap
No scoring		First period	08:20 – sh – Joel Otto (1); 19:59 – Colin Patterson (1)
Greg Adams (2) – 15:56		Second period	03:20 – Theoren Fleury (1); 12:25 – pp – Doug Gilmour (1)
Brian Bradley (1) – pp – 17:18		Third period	09:42 – pp – Hakan Loob (1)
Kirk McLean 24 saves / 28 shots Steve Weeks 8 saves / 9 shots		Goalie stats	Mike Vernon 23 saves / 25 shots

April 8	Calgary Flames	4–0	Vancouver Canucks	Pacific Coliseum	Recap
No scoring		First period	No scoring
Hakan Loob (2) – 02:04; Joe Nieuwendyk (1) – pp – 11:24		Second period	No scoring
Joe Mullen (2) – 01:42; Hakan Loob (3) – 03:36		Third period	No scoring
Mike Vernon 21 saves / 21 shots		Goalie stats	Kirk McLean 11 saves / 15 shots

April 9	Calgary Flames	3–5	Vancouver Canucks	Pacific Coliseum	Recap
No scoring		First period	11:01 – pp – Mel Bridgman (1)
No scoring		Second period	07:33 – pp – Trevor Linden (1); 19:43 – Brian Bradley (2)
Joel Otto (2) – pp – 06:18; Theoren Fleury (2) – pp – 15:02; Joe Nieuwendyk (2) – pp – 19:39		Third period	01:19 – pp – Paul Reinhart (2); 17:05 – pp – Robert Nordmark (2)
Mike Vernon 16 saves / 19 shots Rick Wamsley 8 saves / 10 shots		Goalie stats	Steve Weeks 27 saves / 30 shots

April 11	Vancouver Canucks	0–4	Calgary Flames	Olympic Saddledome	Recap
No scoring		First period	05:37 – Joe Nieuwendyk (3)
No scoring		Second period	09:51 – Mark Hunter (2)
No scoring		Third period	01:04 – Hakan Loob (4); 19:25 – Joe Mullen (3)
Steve Weeks 36 saves / 40 shots		Goalie stats	Mike Vernon 18 saves / 18 shots

April 13	Calgary Flames	3–6	Vancouver Canucks	Pacific Coliseum	Recap
Al MacInnis (1) – pp – 15:50		First period	No scoring
Jim Peplinski (1) – 09:29		Second period	02:32 – sh – Trevor Linden (2); 17:26 – Jim Sandlak (1); 19:29 – Rich Sutter (1); 19:44 – Garth Butcher (1)
Hakan Loob (5) – sh – 05:16		Third period	14:23 – Brian Bradley (3); 19:16 – en – Rich Sutter (2)
Mike Vernon 19 saves / 24 shots		Goalie stats	Kirk McLean 29 saves / 32 shots

April 15	Vancouver Canucks	3–4	OT	Calgary Flames	Olympic Saddledome	Recap
Robert Nordmark (3) – pp – 12:46		First period		09:39 – pp – Joe Nieuwendyk (4); 18:01 – Gary Roberts (1)
Trevor Linden (3) – pp – 02:04		Second period		19:25 – pp – Joe Mullen (4)
Doug Lidster (1) – 07:12		Third period		No scoring
No scoring		First overtime period		19:21 – Joel Otto (3)
Kirk McLean 42 saves / 46 shots		Goalie stats		Mike Vernon 42 saves / 45 shots

Calgary won series 4–3

==== (S2) Los Angeles Kings vs. (S3) Edmonton Oilers ====
This was the fourth playoff series meeting between the Oilers and Kings, and the first since Wayne Gretzky was traded to the Kings. Edmonton won two of the past three playoff series, including the most recent in the 1987 Smythe Division Semifinals in five games. As of 2026, this is the only time that the Oilers blew a three games to one playoff series lead, and the last time the Kings eliminated the Oilers in the playoffs, as the Kings have lost seven straight playoff series with a 2–9 all time series record against the Oilers.

April 5	Edmonton Oilers	4–3	Los Angeles Kings	Great Western Forum	Recap
Tomas Jonsson (1) – pp – 16:54		First period	01:01 – pp – Chris Kontos (1)
Charlie Huddy (1) – pp – 13:58		Second period	19:33 – pp – Steve Duchesne (1)
Esa Tikkanen (1) – 16:06; Craig Simpson (1) – 17:13		Third period	02:55 – pp – Mike Krushelnyski (1)
Grant Fuhr 23 saves / 26 shots		Goalie stats	Glenn Healy 31 saves / 35 shots

April 6	Edmonton Oilers	2–5	Los Angeles Kings	Great Western Forum	Recap
No scoring		First period	10:01 – pp – Chris Kontos (2)
Mark Messier (1) – 07:36; Tomas Jonsson (2) – pp – 17:50		Second period	08:00 – Bernie Nicholls (1); 08:00 – Chris Kontos (3); 15:52 – Wayne Gretzky (1)
No scoring		Third period	01:20 – pp – Chris Kontos (4)
Grant Fuhr 39 saves / 44 shots		Goalie stats	Kelly Hrudey 20 saves / 22 shots

April 8	Los Angeles Kings	0–4	Edmonton Oilers	Northlands Coliseum	Recap
No scoring		First period	15:00 – pp – Jimmy Carson (1); 15:16 – Steve Smith (1)
No scoring		Second period	02:24 – sh – Jari Kurri (1); 03:35 – Jari Kurri (2)
No scoring		Third period	No scoring
Kelly Hrudey 10 saves / 14 shots Glenn Healy 3 saves / 3 shots		Goalie stats	Grant Fuhr 26 saves / 26 shots

April 9	Los Angeles Kings	3–4	Edmonton Oilers	Northlands Coliseum	Recap
Steve Duchesne (2) – 07:11		First period	04:47 – Charlie Huddy (2); 17:39 – Jimmy Carson (2)
Chris Kontos (5) – pp – 05:20; Tom Laidlaw (1) – 18:14		Second period	No scoring
No scoring		Third period	05:16 – Normand Lacombe (1); 19:34 – Steve Smith (2)
Kelly Hrudey 28 saves / 32 shots		Goalie stats	Grant Fuhr 26 saves / 29 shots

April 11	Edmonton Oilers	2–4	Los Angeles Kings	Great Western Forum	Recap
No scoring		First period	06:24 – pp – Chris Kontos (6)
Glenn Anderson (1) – pp – 07:38		Second period	05:32 – pp – Bernie Nicholls (2); 09:44 – Luc Robitaille (1)
Normand Lacombe (2) – 15:55		Third period	18:43 – Wayne Gretzky (2)
Grant Fuhr 39 saves / 43 shots		Goalie stats	Kelly Hrudey 32 saves / 34 shots

April 13	Los Angeles Kings	4–1	Edmonton Oilers	Northlands Coliseum	Recap
No scoring		First period	00:33 – Randy Gregg (1)
Mike Allison (1) – 16:22		Second period	No scoring
Jim Wiemer (1) – 04:14; Chris Kontos (7) – 08:19; Luc Robitaille (2) – 12:13		Third period	No scoring
Kelly Hrudey 22 saves / 23 shots		Goalie stats	Grant Fuhr 25 saves / 29 shots

April 15	Edmonton Oilers	3–6	Los Angeles Kings	Great Western Forum	Recap
Jari Kurri (3) – 04:48		First period	00:52 – Wayne Gretzky (3); 11:56 – pp – Chris Kontos (8)
Craig Simpson (2) – pp – 00:34; Kevin Lowe (1) – 07:48		Second period	06:51 – Bernie Nicholls (3); 16:23 – pp – Bernie Nicholls (4)
No scoring		Third period	14:50 – pp – Dale Degray (1); 18:25 – sh-en – Wayne Gretzky (4)
Grant Fuhr 24 saves / 29 shots		Goalie stats	Kelly Hrudey 31 saves / 34 shots

Los Angeles won series 4–3

== Division finals ==
=== Prince of Wales Conference ===
==== (A1) Montreal Canadiens vs. (A2) Boston Bruins ====
This was the 24th playoff series between these two teams. Montreal lead 20–3 in all-time playoff meetings. Boston won last year's Adams Division Finals in five games.

April 17	Boston Bruins	2–3	Montreal Canadiens	Montreal Forum	Recap
John Carter (1) – 04:39		First period	No scoring
No scoring		Second period	03:42 – Russ Courtnall (3); 18:37 – Mike Keane (2)
Bob Sweeney (2) – 15:57		Third period	00:46 – Claude Lemieux (1)
Andy Moog 12 saves / 15 shots		Goalie stats	Patrick Roy 26 saves / 28 shots

April 19	Boston Bruins	2–3	OT	Montreal Canadiens	Montreal Forum	Recap
No scoring		First period		06:36 – pp – Claude Lemieux (2)
Bob Joyce (1) – 10:56		Second period		No scoring
Randy Burridge (4) – 02:43		Third period		13:48 – Brent Gilchrist (1)
No scoring		First overtime period		12:24 – Bobby Smith (5)
Rejean Lemelin 38 saves / 41 shots		Goalie stats		Patrick Roy 27 saves / 29 shots

April 21	Montreal Canadiens	5–4	Boston Bruins	Boston Garden	Recap
Stephane Richer (3) – 04:06		First period	No scoring
Mats Naslund (3) – 01:59; Petr Svoboda (1) – 13:32		Second period	14:09 – Bob Joyce (2); 17:52 – Bob Joyce (3)
Mike McPhee (3) – 05:27; Russ Courtnall (4) – 13:52		Third period	03:13 – Craig Janney (4); 10:45 – pp – Cam Neely (6)
Patrick Roy 22 saves / 26 shots		Goalie stats	Rejean Lemelin 23 saves / 28 shots

April 23	Montreal Canadiens	2–3	Boston Bruins	Boston Garden	Recap
No scoring		First period	16:28 – Randy Burridge (5)
Russ Courtnall (5) – 03:57		Second period	14:54 – Cam Neely (7); 15:01 – Michael Thelven (1)
Brian Skrudland (3) – 00:12		Third period	No scoring
Brian Hayward 24 saves / 27 shots		Goalie stats	Andy Moog 14 saves / 16 shots

April 25	Boston Bruins	2–3	Montreal Canadiens	Montreal Forum	Recap
Bob Joyce (4) – 15:37		First period	No scoring
No scoring		Second period	04:13 – Chris Chelios (1); 09:50 – Shayne Corson (1)
Bob Joyce (5) – 07:31		Third period	04:14 – Stephane Richer (4)
Andy Moog 24 saves / 27 shots		Goalie stats	Patrick Roy 22 saves / 24 shots

Montreal won series 4–1

==== (P2) Pittsburgh Penguins vs. (P4) Philadelphia Flyers ====
This was the first playoff series between these two teams.

In Game 5, Mario Lemieux, listed as questionable before the game due to his neck, tied four NHL playoff records for goals in one period (4), goals in a game (5), points in a game (8) and points in a period (4).

April 17	Philadelphia Flyers	3–4	Pittsburgh Penguins	Civic Arena	Recap
Dave Poulin (2) – sh – 10:01; Tim Kerr (5) – pp – 17:29		First period	12:44 – pp – Mario Lemieux (4)
Brian Propp (7) – pp – 03:54		Second period	07:44 – pp – Dan Quinn (4); 08:17 – John Cullen (2)
No scoring		Third period	13:26 – Rob Brown (3)
Ron Hextall 25 saves / 29 shots		Goalie stats	Tom Barrasso 27 saves / 30 shots

April 19	Philadelphia Flyers	4–2	Pittsburgh Penguins	Civic Arena	Recap
Tim Kerr (6) – pp – 06:50; Tim Kerr (7) – 12:09; Tim Kerr (8) – pp – 18:13		First period	03:06 – pp – Dan Quinn (5)
Brian Propp (8) – 19:36		Second period	14:22 – sh – Mario Lemieux (5)
No scoring		Third period	No scoring
Ron Hextall 28 saves / 30 shots		Goalie stats	Wendell Young 10 saves / 11 shots Tom Barrasso 6 saves / 9 shots

April 21	Pittsburgh Penguins	4–3	OT	Philadelphia Flyers	Spectrum	Recap
Mario Lemieux (6) – pp – 12:07		First period		No scoring
Dan Quinn (6) – pp – 04:39; Jock Callander (2) – 18:15		Second period		08:17 – Keith Acton (2); 13:27 – pp – Brian Propp (9)
No scoring		Third period		02:51 – Dave Poulin (3)
Phil Bourque (4) – 12:08		First overtime period		No scoring
Tom Barrasso 44 saves / 47 shots		Goalie stats		Ron Hextall 28 saves / 32 shots

April 23	Pittsburgh Penguins	1–4	Philadelphia Flyers	Spectrum	Recap
Dave Poulin (4) – 13:24		First period	03:22 – John Cullen (3)
No scoring		Second period	06:37 – pp – Tim Kerr (9); 09:18 – pp – Tim Kerr (10)
No scoring		Third period	07:17 – sh – Terry Carkner (1)
Tom Barrasso 24 saves / 28 shots		Goalie stats	Ron Hextall 18 saves / 19 shots

April 25	Philadelphia Flyers	7–10	Pittsburgh Penguins	Civic Arena	Recap
Mike Bullard (2) – 11:45		First period	02:15 – Mario Lemieux (7); 03:45 – Mario Lemieux (8); 06:55 – pp – Mario Lemieux (9); 07:07 – Bob Errey (1); 17:09 – pp – Mario Lemieux (10); 17:44 – Troy Loney (1)
Pelle Eklund (2) – pp – 00:06; Brian Propp (10) – 09:07		Second period	01:43 – Kevin Stevens (3); 10:35 – Rob Brown (4); 12:55 – pp – Rob Brown (5)
Derrick Smith (1) – sh – 00:48; Tim Kerr (11) – 10:21; Pelle Eklund (3) – pp – 13:02; Tim Kerr (12) – 17:23		Third period	19:23 – Mario Lemieux (11)
Ron Hextall 17 saves / 26 shots Ken Wregget 8 saves / 8 shots		Goalie stats	Tom Barrasso 38 saves / 45 shots

April 27	Pittsburgh Penguins	2–6	Philadelphia Flyers	Spectrum	Recap
No scoring		First period	04:28 – Tim Kerr (13); 18:22 – Tim Kerr (14)
Randy Cunneyworth (2) – pp – 02:18; Randy Cunneyworth (3) – 05:24		Second period	03:28 – Derrick Smith (2); 08:40 – Ron Sutter (1); 19:01 – Derrick Smith (3)
No scoring		Third period	18:56 – pp – Brian Propp (11)
Tom Barrasso 32 saves / 38 shots		Goalie stats	Ron Hextall 20 saves / 22 shots

April 29	Philadelphia Flyers	4–1	Pittsburgh Penguins	Civic Arena	Recap
Brian Propp (12) – 17:41		First period	No scoring
Dave Poulin (5) – sh – 06:57		Second period	04:21 – pp – Mario Lemieux (12)
Mike Bullard (3) – pp – 00:40; Scott Mellanby (3) – 19:32		Third period	No scoring
Ken Wregget 39 saves / 40 shots		Goalie stats	Tom Barrasso 30 saves / 33 shots

Philadelphia won series 4–3

=== Clarence Campbell Conference ===
==== (N2) St. Louis Blues vs. (N4) Chicago Blackhawks ====
This was the sixth playoff meeting between these two teams, and were meeting for the second straight year. Chicago has won four of the previous five meetings. St. Louis won last year's Norris Division Semifinals in five games.

April 18	Chicago Blackhawks	3–1	St. Louis Blues	St. Louis Arena	Recap
No scoring		First period	No scoring
Steve Larmer (4) – 15:16		Second period	13:58 – Greg Paslawski (2)
Steve Thomas (1) – 00:31; Trent Yawney (1) – 05:04		Third period	No scoring
Alain Chevrier 27 saves / 28 shots		Goalie stats	Greg Millen 31 saves / 34 shots

April 20	Chicago Blackhawks	4–5	2OT	St. Louis Blues	St. Louis Arena	Recap
No scoring		First period		00:31 – Rod Brind'Amour (2); 01:52 – Sergio Momesso (2)
Duane Sutter (3) – 03:06; Adam Creighton (5) – sh – 08:42; Steve Larmer (5) – 14:08		Second period		13:17 – Brett Hull (5)
Dirk Graham (2) – 11:19		Third period		03:59 – pp – Brian Benning (1)
No scoring		Second overtime period		13:49 – Tony Hrkac (1)
Alain Chevrier 51 saves / 56 shots Darren Pang 0 saves / 0 shots		Goalie stats		Greg Millen 31 saves / 35 shots

April 22	St. Louis Blues	2–5	Chicago Blackhawks	Chicago Stadium	Recap
No scoring		First period	17:05 – pp – Steve Larmer (6); 19:27 – sh – Denis Savard (5)
Steve Tuttle (1) – 05:44; Paul Cavallini (2) – 16:40		Second period	08:10 – Wayne Presley (6); 12:51 – Bob Bassen (1)
No scoring		Third period	04:24 – Denis Savard (6)
Greg Millen 24 saves / 29 shots		Goalie stats	Alain Chevrier 18 saves / 20 shots

April 24	St. Louis Blues	2–3	Chicago Blackhawks	Chicago Stadium	Recap
Mike Lalor (1) – pp – 04:56		First period	15:05 – sh – Trent Yawney (2)
Bernie Federko (3) – 08:51		Second period	15:45 – Keith Brown (1)
No scoring		Third period	15:41 – pp – Steve Larmer (7)
Greg Millen 21 saves / 24 shots		Goalie stats	Alain Chevrier 25 saves / 27 shots

April 26	Chicago Blackhawks	4–2	St. Louis Blues	St. Louis Arena	Recap
No scoring		First period	04:18 – pp – Bernie Federko (4)
Bob Murray (2) – 09:17; Wayne Presley (7) – 09:25; Jeremy Roenick (1) – pp – 12:13		Second period	17:28 – Tom Tilley (1)
Steve Thomas (2) – 08:23		Third period	No scoring
Alain Chevrier 19 saves / 21 shots		Goalie stats	Greg Millen 31 saves / 35 shots

Chicago won series 4–1

==== (S1) Calgary Flames vs. (S2) Los Angeles Kings ====
This was the second consecutive and fourth overall playoff meeting between these two teams; with Los Angeles winning two of the three previous series. They met in last year's Smythe Division Semifinals, which Calgary won in five games.

April 18	Los Angeles Kings	3–4	OT	Calgary Flames	Olympic Saddledome	Recap
Bernie Nicholls (5) – pp – 18:00		First period		16:20 – pp – Theoren Fleury (3)
Chris Kontos (9) – 05:13; Jim Wiemer (2) – 15:23		Second period		09:02 – Brian MacLellan (1)
No scoring		Third period		18:24 – Gary Roberts (2)
No scoring		First overtime period		07:47 – Doug Gilmour (2)
Kelly Hrudey 43 saves / 47 shots		Goalie stats		Mike Vernon 24 saves / 27 shots

April 20	Los Angeles Kings	3–8	Calgary Flames	Olympic Saddledome	Recap
Bernie Nicholls (6) – 13:59		First period	00:58 – Colin Patterson (2); 04:48 – Doug Gilmour (3); 06:05 – Doug Gilmour (4); 11:35 – pp – Al MacInnis (2)
Bernie Nicholls (7) – 19:59		Second period	05:32 – pp – Rob Ramage (1); 19:20 – sh – Hakan Loob (6)
Dave Taylor (1) – 07:49		Third period	09:56 – Joe Mullen (5); 11:56 – Gary Roberts (3)
Kelly Hrudey 25 saves / 31 shots Glenn Healy 19 saves / 21 shots		Goalie stats	Mike Vernon 20 saves / 23 shots

April 22	Calgary Flames	5–2	Los Angeles Kings	Great Western Forum	Recap
Jamie Macoun (2) – 07:26; Joel Otto (4) – 13:56		First period	No scoring
No scoring		Second period	No scoring
Doug Gilmour (5) – 13:44; Doug Gilmour (6) – 16:27; Joe Mullen (6) – 17:15		Third period	00:47 – Tom Laidlaw (2); 14:39 – Steve Kasper (1)
Mike Vernon 21 saves / 23 shots		Goalie stats	Kelly Hrudey 20 saves / 25 shots

April 24	Calgary Flames	5–3	Los Angeles Kings	Great Western Forum	Recap
Joe Mullen (7) – pp – 07:24; Gary Roberts (4) – 08:34		First period	01:23 – Steve Duchesne (3); 11:20 – pp – Wayne Gretzky (5)
Joe Nieuwendyk (5) – pp – 19:12		Second period	No scoring
Joe Mullen (8) – 04:59; Gary Roberts (5) – 19:57		Third period	09:41 – pp – Steve Duchesne (4)
Mike Vernon 19 saves / 22 shots		Goalie stats	Kelly Hrudey 26 saves / 30 shots

Calgary won series 4–0

== Conference finals ==
=== Prince of Wales Conference final ===
==== (A1) Montreal Canadiens vs. (P4) Philadelphia Flyers ====
This was the fourth playoff meeting between these two teams. Montreal won two of the previous three playoff series. Philadelphia won the most recent meeting in six games in the 1987 Prince of Wales Conference Final.

May 1	Philadelphia Flyers	3–1	Montreal Canadiens	Montreal Forum	Recap
Derrick Smith (4) – sh – 13:45		First period	No scoring
No scoring		Second period	No scoring
Ilkka Sinisalo (1) – sh – 11:19; Rick Tocchet (6) – 13:09		Third period	12:06 – pp – Shayne Corson (2)
Ken Wregget 24 saves / 25 shots		Goalie stats	Patrick Roy 23 saves / 26 shots

May 3	Philadelphia Flyers	0–3	Montreal Canadiens	Montreal Forum	Recap
No scoring		First period	05:31 – pp – Stephane Richer (5)
No scoring		Second period	14:30 – pp – Eric Desjardins (1)
No scoring		Third period	09:28 – Guy Carbonneau (2)
Ken Wregget 36 saves / 39 shots		Goalie stats	Patrick Roy 24 saves / 24 shots

May 5	Montreal Canadiens	5–1	Philadelphia Flyers	Spectrum	Recap
Guy Carbonneau (3) – 14:26		First period	No scoring
Shayne Corson (3) – pp – 03:14; Bob Gainey (1) – 06:11; Russ Courtnall (6) – 14:53		Second period	No scoring
Bobby Smith (6) – 12:21		Third period	06:56 – Brian Propp (13)
Patrick Roy 25 saves / 26 shots		Goalie stats	Ken Wregget 21 saves / 26 shots

May 7	Montreal Canadiens	3–0	Philadelphia Flyers	Spectrum	Recap
No scoring		First period	No scoring
Shayne Corson (4) – 10:09; Chris Chelios (2) – pp – 13:57; Guy Carbonneau (4) – sh – 17:40		Second period	No scoring
No scoring		Third period	No scoring
Patrick Roy 17 saves / 17 shots		Goalie stats	Ron Hextall 29 saves / 32 shots

May 9	Philadelphia Flyers	2–1	OT	Montreal Canadiens	Montreal Forum	Recap
No scoring		First period		No scoring
Derrick Smith (5) – 03:53		Second period		No scoring
No scoring		Third period		15:46 – Bobby Smith (7)
Dave Poulin (6) – 05:02		First overtime period		No scoring
Ron Hextall 27 saves / 28 shots		Goalie stats		Patrick Roy 21 saves / 23 shots

May 11	Montreal Canadiens	4–2	Philadelphia Flyers	Spectrum	Recap
Mike Keane (3) – pp – 15:42		First period	12:49 – Scott Mellanby (4)
Bobby Smith (8) – pp – 07:44; Chris Chelios (3) – 15:10		Second period	No scoring
Ryan Walter (2) – 07:40		Third period	13:55 – Brian Propp (14)
Patrick Roy 15 saves / 17 shots		Goalie stats	Ron Hextall 22 saves / 26 shots

Montreal won series 4–2

=== Clarence Campbell Conference final ===
==== (S1) Calgary Flames vs. (N4) Chicago Blackhawks ====
This was the second playoff meeting between these two teams. Calgary won the only previous meeting in a three-game sweep in the 1981 Preliminary Round.

May 2	Chicago Blackhawks	0–3	Calgary Flames	Olympic Saddledome	Recap
No scoring		First period	10:18 – Jamie Macoun (3)
No scoring		Second period	12:02 – pp – Joe Nieuwendyk (6)
No scoring		Third period	06:13 – Brian MacLellan (2)
Alain Chevrier 32 saves / 35 shots Darren Pang 4 saves / 4 shots		Goalie stats	Mike Vernon 19 saves / 19 shots

May 4	Chicago Blackhawks	4–2	Calgary Flames	Olympic Saddledome	Recap
Steve Larmer (8) – 02:19; Denis Savard (7) – 03:52; Steve Thomas (3) – pp – 06:02		First period	19:10 – pp – Hakan Loob (7)
Trent Yawney (3) – 09:10		Second period	No scoring
No scoring		Third period	10:03 – Joe Mullen (9)
Alain Chevrier 22 saves / 24 shots		Goalie stats	Mike Vernon 18 saves / 22 shots

May 6	Calgary Flames	5–2	Chicago Blackhawks	Chicago Stadium	Recap
Joe Mullen (10) – 04:11; Joe Nieuwendyk (7) – pp – 14:57		First period	No scoring
Theoren Fleury (4) – pp – 08:07		Second period	06:49 – Steve Konroyd (2); 17:00 – Troy Murray (3)
Hakan Loob (8) – 11:46; Joe Mullen (11) – 19:16		Third period	No scoring
Mike Vernon 24 saves / 26 shots		Goalie stats	Alain Chevrier 18 saves / 22 shots

May 8	Calgary Flames	2–1	OT	Chicago Blackhawks	Chicago Stadium	Recap
No scoring		First period		No scoring
Doug Gilmour (7) – pp – 18:03		Second period		10:25 – pp – Denis Savard (8)
No scoring		Third period		No scoring
Al MacInnis (3) – pp – 15:05		First overtime period		No scoring
Mike Vernon 24 saves / 25 shots		Goalie stats		Alain Chevrier 30 saves / 32 shots

May 10	Chicago Blackhawks	1–3	Calgary Flames	Olympic Saddledome	Recap
No scoring		First period	07:29 – Joe Nieuwendyk (8)
Mike Hudson (1) – pp – 18:48		Second period	No scoring
No scoring		Third period	05:19 – Brian MacLellan (3); 16:59 – Joe Nieuwendyk (9)
Alain Chevrier 40 saves / 43 shots		Goalie stats	Mike Vernon 20 saves / 21 shots

Calgary won series 4–1

== Stanley Cup Final ==
This was the second playoff series between these two teams, with the only previous meeting being the 1986 Stanley Cup Final where Montreal defeated Calgary in five games. This was the Flames second appearance in the Finals, while Montreal was making their 33rd appearance in the Finals. Calgary was trying to win their first Stanley Cup in franchise history, while Montreal last won the Stanley Cup in 1986.

The Stanley Cup Final was decided between the two teams with the best records of the 1988–89 NHL regular season. Co-captain Lanny McDonald scored the second Flames goal in Game 6. This turned out to be the last goal in his Hockey Hall of Fame career, as he retired during the following off-season. Doug Gilmour scored two goals in the third period, including the eventual game and Cup winner to cement their first title for the Flames.

To date this remains the last all-Canadian Cup Final.

May 14	Montreal Canadiens	2–3	Calgary Flames	Olympic Saddledome	Recap
Stephane Richer (6) – pp – 02:43; Larry Robinson (1) – 10:02		First period	06:51 – pp – Al MacInnis (4); 08:33 – Al MacInnis (5)
No scoring		Second period	11:45 – Theoren Fleury (5)
No scoring		Third period	No scoring
Patrick Roy 32 saves / 35 shots		Goalie stats	Mike Vernon 29 saves / 31 shots

May 17	Montreal Canadiens	4–2	Calgary Flames	Olympic Saddledome	Recap
Larry Robinson (2) – 04:18		First period	No scoring
Bobby Smith (9) – pp – 01:55		Second period	05:14 – Joe Nieuwendyk (10); 13:49 – pp – Joel Otto (5)
Chris Chelios (4) – 08:01; Russ Courtnall (7) – pp – 09:35		Third period	No scoring
Patrick Roy 30 saves / 32 shots		Goalie stats	Mike Vernon 19 saves / 23 shots

May 19	Calgary Flames	3–4	2OT	Montreal Canadiens	Montreal Forum	Recap
Joe Mullen (12) – 17:15		First period		01:32 – Mike McPhee (4)
Joe Mullen (13) – pp – 15:35		Second period		No scoring
Doug Gilmour (8) – 13:02		Third period		01:36 – Bobby Smith (10); 19:19 – Mats Naslund (4)
No scoring		Second overtime period		18:08 – Ryan Walter (3)
Mike Vernon 31 saves / 35 shots		Goalie stats		Patrick Roy 34 saves / 37 shots

May 21	Calgary Flames	4–2	Montreal Canadiens	Montreal Forum	Recap
No scoring		First period	No scoring
Doug Gilmour (9) – 10:59; Joe Mullen (14) – pp – 18:43		Second period	No scoring
Al MacInnis (6) – 18:22; Joe Mullen (15) – pp-en – 19:49		Third period	10:59 – Russ Courtnall (8); 19:33 – Claude Lemieux (3)
Mike Vernon 17 saves / 19 shots		Goalie stats	Patrick Roy 31 saves / 34 shots

May 23	Montreal Canadiens	2–3	Calgary Flames	Olympic Saddledome	Recap
Bobby Smith (11) – pp – 13:24		First period	00:28 – Joel Otto (6); 08:15 – Joe Mullen (16); 19:31 – pp – Al MacInnis (7)
Mike Keane (4) – 14:17		Second period	No scoring
No scoring		Third period	No scoring
Patrick Roy 25 saves / 28 shots		Goalie stats	Mike Vernon 26 saves / 28 shots

May 25	Calgary Flames	4–2	Montreal Canadiens	Montreal Forum	Recap
Colin Patterson (3) – 18:51		First period	No scoring
Lanny McDonald (1) – 04:24		Second period	01:23 – Claude Lemieux (4)
Doug Gilmour (10) – pp – 11:02; Doug Gilmour (11) – en – 18:57		Third period	11:53 – Rick Green (1)
Mike Vernon 20 saves / 22 shots		Goalie stats	Patrick Roy 15 saves / 18 shots

Calgary won series 4–2

== Player statistics ==
=== Skaters ===
These are the top ten skaters based on points.

Player	Team	GP	G	A	Pts	+/–	PIM
Al MacInnis	Calgary Flames	22	7	24	31	+6	46
Tim Kerr	Philadelphia Flyers	19	14	11	25	+1	27
Joe Mullen	Calgary Flames	21	16	8	24	+8	4
Brian Propp	Philadelphia Flyers	18	14	9	23	+8	14
Doug Gilmour	Calgary Flames	22	11	11	22	+12	20
Wayne Gretzky	Los Angeles Kings	11	5	17	22	-4	0
Mario Lemieux	Pittsburgh Penguins	11	12	7	19	-1	16
Bobby Smith	Montreal Canadiens	21	11	8	19	+1	46
Denis Savard	Chicago Blackhawks	16	8	11	19	+8	10
Joel Otto	Calgary Flames	22	6	13	19	+2	46

=== Goaltenders ===
This is a combined table of the top five goaltenders based on goals against average and the top five goaltenders based on save percentage, with at least 420 minutes played. The table is sorted by GAA, and the criteria for inclusion are bolded.

Player	Team	GP	W	L	SA	GA	GAA	SV%	SO	TOI
Patrick Roy	Montreal Canadiens	19	13	6	526	42	**2.09**	**.920**	2	1206:10
Mike Vernon	Calgary Flames	22	16	5	549	52	**2.26**	**.905**	3	1380:55
Alain Chevrier	Chicago Blackhawks	16	9	7	483	44	**2.61**	**.909**	0	1013:00
Greg Millen	St. Louis Blues	10	5	5	308	34	**3.14**	.890	0	649:22
Ron Hextall	Philadelphia Flyers	15	8	7	445	49	**3.32**	**.890**	0	886:22

== See also ==
- List of Stanley Cup champions

Preceded by 1988 Stanley Cup playoffs	Stanley Cup playoffs	Succeeded by 1990 Stanley Cup playoffs
