= Shayne Stevenson (ice hockey) =

Canadian ice hockey player (born 1970)

- Born: October 26, 1970 (age 55) Aurora, Ontario, Canada
- Height: 6 ft 1 in (185 cm)
- Weight: 190 lb (86 kg; 13 st 8 lb)
- Position: Centre
- Shot: Right
- Played for: Boston Bruins; Tampa Bay Lightning
- NHL draft: 17th overall, 1989; Boston Bruins
- Playing career: 1990–2000

Shayne Stevenson (born October 26, 1970) is a Canadian former professional ice hockey centre. He was drafted in the first round, 17th overall, by the Boston Bruins in the 1989 NHL entry draft.

== Playing career ==
He appeared in nineteen National Hockey League games with the Bruins, scoring just one assist, before being selected by the Tampa Bay Lightning in the 1992 NHL Expansion Draft. He appeared in eight games with the Lightning in 1992–93, scoring one assist.

He currently resides in Newmarket, Ontario.

== Career statistics ==
=== Regular season and playoffs ===
			Regular season					Playoffs
Season	Team	League	GP	G	A	Pts	PIM	GP	G	A	Pts	PIM
1985–86	Barrie Colts	CJHL	38	14	23	37	75	—	—	—	—	—
1985–86	Orillia Travelways	OPJHL	1	0	0	0	0	—	—	—	—	—
1986–87	London Knights	OHL	61	7	15	22	56	—	—	—	—	—
1987–88	London Knights	OHL	36	14	25	39	56	—	—	—	—	—
1987–88	Kitchener Rangers	OHL	30	10	25	35	48	4	1	1	2	4
1988–89	Kitchener Rangers	OHL	56	25	51	76	86	5	2	3	5	4
1989–90	Kitchener Rangers	OHL	56	28	62	90	115	17	16	21	37	31
1990–91	Maine Mariners	AHL	58	22	28	50	112	—	—	—	—	—
1990–91	Boston Bruins	NHL	14	0	0	0	26	—	—	—	—	—
1991–92	Maine Mariners	AHL	54	10	23	33	150	—	—	—	—	—
1991–92	Boston Bruins	NHL	5	0	1	1	2	—	—	—	—	—
1992–93	Atlanta Knights	IHL	53	17	17	34	160	6	0	2	2	21
1992–93	Tampa Bay Lightning	NHL	8	0	1	1	7	—	—	—	—	—
1993–94	EV MAK Bruneck	AL	16	8	15	23	66	—	—	—	—	—
1993–94	Muskegon Fury	CoHL	1	2	0	2	0	—	—	—	—	—
1993–94	St. Thomas Wildcats	CoHL	6	3	3	6	15	2	0	2	2	9
1993–94	Fort Wayne Komets	IHL	22	3	5	8	116	—	—	—	—	—
1994–95	Utica Blizzard	CoHL	43	17	40	57	37	6	0	3	3	14
1995–96	Utica Blizzard	CoHL	27	11	21	32	72	—	—	—	—	—
1996–97	Utica Blizzard	CoHL	10	2	6	8	18	—	—	—	—	—
1996–97	Saginaw LumberKings	CoHL	23	10	14	24	12	—	—	—	—	—
1996–97	Brantford Smoke	CoHL	10	3	9	12	25	6	5	3	8	24
1997–98	Port Huron Border Cats	UHL	18	8	9	17	27	3	2	0	2	4
1998–99	San Angelo Outlaws	WPHL	48	28	28	56	41	13	7	8	15	51
1999–00	Ayr Scottish Eagles	BISL	11	2	8	10	26	7	2	2	4	29
AHL totals			112	32	51	83	262	—	—	—	—	—
NHL totals			27	0	2	2	35	—	—	—	—	—
CoHL/UHL totals			132	48	111	159	224	17	5	10	15	51

=== Roller Hockey statistics ===
			Regular season					Playoffs
Season	Team	League	GP	G	A	Pts	PIM	GP	G	A	Pts	PIM
1998	Port Huron North Americans	MLRH	9	11	7	18	4	—	—	—	—	—
1998	Toronto Torpedoes	MLRH	5	7	2	9	7	—	—	—	—	—
MLRH totals			14	18	9	27	11	—	—	—	—	—

Preceded by Robert Cimetta	Boston Bruins first-round draft pick 1989	Succeeded by Bryan Smolinski
