= Martin Simard =

Canadian ice hockey player

- Born: 25 June 1966 (age 59) Montreal, Quebec, Canada
- Height: 6 ft 1 in (185 cm)
- Weight: 215 lb (98 kg; 15 st 5 lb)
- Position: Left wing
- Shot: Right
- Played for: Calgary Flames; Tampa Bay Lightning
- National team: Canada
- NHL draft: undrafted
- Playing career: 1987–1998

Martin Simard (born June 25, 1966) is a Canadian former professional ice hockey player. He played 44 National Hockey League games for the Calgary Flames and Tampa Bay Lightning.

== Playing career ==
Born in Montreal, Quebec, Simard was not chosen in the NHL Entry Draft. Simard turned professional in 1987 by signing with the Flames. He spent four years in the Flames organization before getting a call up to the NHL in 1990–91 In 32 games played with the Flames over the next two seasons, Simard recorded one goal and five assists. He played seven more games with the Lightning in 1992–93 before returning to the minors to finish out his career. Simard retired following the 1997–98 season.

== Career statistics ==
=== Regular season and playoffs ===
			Regular season					Playoffs
Season	Team	League	GP	G	A	Pts	PIM	GP	G	A	Pts	PIM
1983–84	Quebec Remparts	QMJHL	59	6	10	16	26	4	0	0	0	0
1984–85	Granby Bisons	QMJHL	58	22	31	53	78	—	—	—	—	—
1985–86	Granby Bisons	QMJHL	54	32	28	60	129	—	—	—	—	—
1985–86	Hull Olympiques	QMJHL	14	8	8	16	55	14	8	19	27	19
1986–87	Granby Bisons	QMJHL	41	30	47	77	105	8	3	7	10	21
1987–88	Salt Lake Golden Eagles	IHL	82	8	23	31	281	19	6	3	9	100
1988–89	Salt Lake Golden Eagles	IHL	71	13	15	28	221	14	4	0	4	45
1989–90	Salt Lake Golden Eagles	IHL	59	22	23	45	151	11	5	8	13	12
1990–91	Salt Lake Golden Eagles	IHL	54	24	25	49	113	4	3	0	3	20
1990–91	Calgary Flames	NHL	16	0	2	2	53	—	—	—	—	—
1991–92	Halifax Citadels	AHL	10	5	3	8	26	—	—	—	—	—
1991–92	Salt Lake Golden Eagles	IHL	11	3	7	10	51	—	—	—	—	—
1991–92	Calgary Flames	NHL	21	1	3	4	119	—	—	—	—	—
1992–93	Atlanta Knights	IHL	19	5	5	10	77	—	—	—	—	—
1992–93	Halifax Citadels	AHL	13	3	4	7	17	—	—	—	—	—
1992–93	Tampa Bay Lightning	NHL	7	0	0	0	11	—	—	—	—	—
1993–94	Cornwall Aces	AHL	57	10	10	20	152	7	3	1	4	7
1994–95	Milwaukee Admirals	IHL	57	7	5	12	100	5	0	0	0	2
1995–96	Providence Bruins	AHL	78	26	27	53	184	4	1	1	2	6
1996–97	Providence Bruins	AHL	69	13	25	38	137	9	1	0	1	10
1997–98	Springfield Falcons	AHL	35	9	5	14	89	—	—	—	—	—
NHL totals			44	1	5	6	183	—	—	—	—	—
