= Chris Kontos =

Canadian ice hockey player (born 1963)

- Born: December 10, 1963 (age 62) Toronto, Ontario, Canada
- Height: 6 ft 1 in (185 cm)
- Weight: 195 lb (88 kg; 13 st 13 lb)
- Position: Left wing
- Shot: Left
- Played for: New York Rangers; Pittsburgh Penguins; Los Angeles Kings; Tampa Bay Lightning
- National team: Canada
- NHL draft: 15th overall, 1982; New York Rangers
- Playing career: 1982–1998
Medal record
Men's Ice hockey
Silver medal – second place	1994 Lillehammer	Ice hockey

Christopher T. Kontos (born December 10, 1963) is a Canadian former professional ice hockey player. Kontos is best known for his nine goals in 11 playoff games while he was a member of the Los Angeles Kings and his franchise opening night four-goal performance (with the Tampa Bay Lightning) against that season's Vezina Trophy winner Ed Belfour.

== Career ==
Born in Toronto, Ontario, Kontos played junior hockey for the Sudbury Wolves and Toronto Marlboros. During the 1981–82 OHL season he scored 42 goals, and after the season was drafted with the 15th selection in the first round of the 1982 NHL entry draft by the New York Rangers. He split his time in both the NHL and minor leagues in his first two seasons.

He was member of the Tulsa Oilers (CHL) team that suspended operations on February 16, 1984, playing only road games for final six weeks of 1983–84 season. Despite this adversity, the team went on to win the league's championship. Kontos spent the first half of 1985–86 playing in Finland before returning to finish the year in the AHL. On January 21, 1987, Kontos was traded to the Pittsburgh Penguins for Ron Duguay, finishing his tenure with the Rangers with 38 points in 78 games. He would score 25 points in 67 games with the Penguins over two seasons before being dealt to the Los Angeles Kings on February 5, 1988.

He played only six regular season games for the Kings in 87–88 tallying 12 points (another career highlight was a 6-point game against Chicago where Kontos had 1 goal and 5 assists), and scored a goal in his first NHL playoffs. The following year, after returning from playing in Switzerland he scored three points in seven games, and his 9 playoff goals would help the Kings advance to the second round. He played only 11 games (6 regular season, 5 playoff) with Los Angeles after the 1988–89 playoff run, and decided to join the Canadian National Team in 1991–92.

When the Tampa Bay Lightning started play in 1992–93, Kontos signed on as a free agent. His surprising 4-goal performance led the upstart Tampa Bay Lightning to a 7–3 shocker of the Chicago Blackhawks on October 7, 1992, and remains tied for the team record for goals scored in a single game. He scored 27 goals in 66 games, second on the team only to Brian Bradley. He would return to the National Team in 93–94, and helped Canada win a silver medal at the 1994 Olympics. Kontos would never return to the NHL, and continued to play in Sweden, the IHL and Germany before retiring in 1998.

== Career statistics ==
=== Regular season and playoffs ===
			Regular season					Playoffs
Season	Team	League	GP	G	A	Pts	PIM	GP	G	A	Pts	PIM
1980–81	Sudbury Wolves	OHL	56	17	27	44	36	—	—	—	—	—
1981–82	Sudbury Wolves	OHL	12	6	6	12	18	—	—	—	—	—
1981–82	Toronto Marlboros	OHL	59	36	56	92	68	10	7	9	16	2
1982–83	Toronto Marlboros	OHL	28	21	33	54	23	—	—	—	—	—
1982–83	New York Rangers	NHL	44	8	7	15	33	—	—	—	—	—
1983–84	New York Rangers	NHL	6	0	1	1	8	—	—	—	—	—
1983–84	Tulsa Oilers	CHL	21	5	13	18	8	—	—	—	—	—
1984–85	New Haven Nighthawks	AHL	48	19	24	43	30	—	—	—	—	—
1984–85	New York Rangers	NHL	28	4	8	12	24	—	—	—	—	—
1985–86	New Haven Nighthawks	AHL	21	8	15	23	12	5	4	2	6	4
1985–86	Ilves	SM-l	36	16	15	31	30	—	—	—	—	—
1986–87	New Haven Nighthawks	AHL	36	14	17	31	29	—	—	—	—	—
1986–87	Pittsburgh Penguins	NHL	31	8	9	17	6	—	—	—	—	—
1987–88	Pittsburgh Penguins	NHL	36	1	7	8	12	—	—	—	—	—
1987–88	Muskegon Lumberjacks	IHL	10	3	6	9	8	—	—	—	—	—
1987–88	Los Angeles Kings	NHL	6	2	10	12	2	4	1	0	1	4
1987–88	New Haven Nighthawks	AHL	16	8	16	24	4	—	—	—	—	—
1988–89	EHC Kloten	NDA	36	32	24	56	30	6	5	4	9	2
1988–89	Los Angeles Kings	NHL	7	2	1	3	2	11	9	0	9	8
1989–90	New Haven Nighthawks	AHL	42	10	20	30	25	—	—	—	—	—
1989–90	Los Angeles Kings	NHL	6	2	2	4	4	5	1	0	1	0
1990–91	Phoenix Roadrunners	IHL	69	26	36	62	19	11	9	12	21	0
1991–92	Courmaosta HC	ITA.2	7	10	8	18	4	—	—	—	—	—
1991–92	Canada	Intl	26	10	10	20	4	—	—	—	—	—
1992–93	Tampa Bay Lightning	NHL	66	27	24	51	12	—	—	—	—	—
1993–94	Canada	Intl	43	19	17	36	14	—	—	—	—	—
1994–95	Skellefteå AIK	SWE.2	31	19	24	43	28	5	2	3	5	4
1995–96	Cincinnati Cyclones	IHL	81	26	44	70	13	17	5	8	13	0
1996–97	Cincinnati Cyclones	IHL	11	1	3	4	4	—	—	—	—	—
1996–97	Québec Rafales	IHL	19	8	3	11	0	—	—	—	—	—
1996–97	Manitoba Moose	IHL	40	17	18	35	12	—	—	—	—	—
1997–98	Revierlöwen Oberhausen	DEL	27	11	4	15	14	—	—	—	—	—
NHL totals			230	54	69	123	103	20	11	0	11	12
AHL totals			163	59	92	151	100	5	4	2	6	4
IHL totals			230	81	110	191	56	28	14	20	34	0

=== International ===
Year	Team	Event	GP	G	A	Pts	PIM
1994	Canada	OG	8	3	1	4	2

== Awards ==
He won the 1983-84 CHL Championship (Adams Cup) as a member of the Tulsa Oilers team coached by Tom Webster.

Preceded by James Patrick	New York Rangers first-round draft pick 1982	Succeeded by Dave Gagner
