= Alain Chevrier =

Canadian ice hockey player (born 1961)

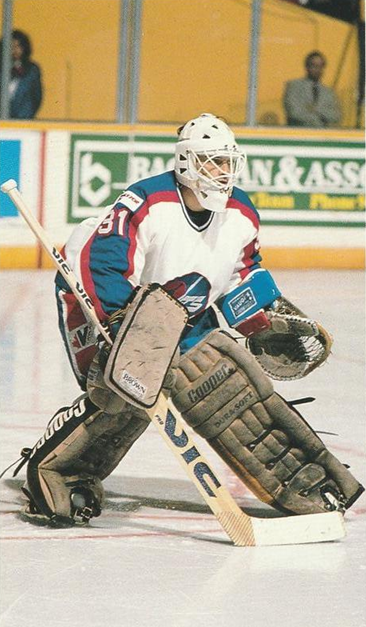
- Born: April 23, 1961 (age 65) Cornwall, Ontario, Canada
- Height: 5 ft 8 in (173 cm)
- Weight: 180 lb (82 kg; 12 st 12 lb)
- Position: Goaltender
- Caught: Left
- Played for: New Jersey Devils; Winnipeg Jets; Chicago Blackhawks; Pittsburgh Penguins; Detroit Red Wings
- NHL draft: Undrafted
- Playing career: 1985–1991

Alain Guy Chevrier (born April 23, 1961) is a Canadian former ice hockey goaltender.

== Junior Hockey and Collegiate Career ==
As a youth, Chevrier played in the 1974 Quebec International Pee-Wee Hockey Tournament with a minor ice hockey team from Cornwall, Ontario. He took a first step into junior hockey in 1978-79 playing at Canada's highest tier for his hometown Cornwall Royals of the Quebec Major Junior Hockey League before moving to the Ottawa Jr. Senators of the Central Junior A Hockey League the following season. At the time, playing major juniors in Canada did not violate NCAA amateur eligibility, and Chevrier elected to move to US college hockey, playing for the Miami University in Oxford, Ohio beginning in 1980.

Alain was a regular starter for the new Miami program, which only started NCAA Division I play in 1978, earning four letters under coach Steve Cady. Chevrier was named the team Rookie of the Year for the 1980-81 season, honored by the Blue Line Club in his senior season, and is among the all-time leaders at Miami with 2,440 saves in his 4-year collegiate career. Chevrier was the first Miami hockey player inducted into the Miami Hall of Fame in 1992.

== Professional career ==
Undrafted out of Miami, Chevrier signed with the Fort Wayne Komets of the International Hockey League (IHL), earning playing time over a pool of goaltenders, playing 56 games, going 26-21-7 with 3.62 GAA. His play earned the notice of the New Jersey Devils, where he'd spend the next three NHL seasons, becoming the starter for the 1986-87 season, and splitting time in 1987-88 with Bob Sauve and Olympian Sean Burke, with Chevrier posting a solid 3.77 GAA.

On March 9, 1986, Gilbert Perreault scored the 500th goal of his NHL career vs Chevrier.

Chevrier was traded in 1988 to the Winnipeg Jets along with a 7th round pick for Steve Rooney. Chevrier would be in a goalie logjam in Winnipeg, playing only 22 games, going 8-8-2, with a 4.29 GAA, before being traded in January 1989 to the Chicago Blackhawks for a fourth-round pick in the draft. Chevrier was thrown into the starting role thanks to struggles of Darren Pang and rookie Ed Belfour, and Alain had a hot hand in 27 games going 13–11–2 with a 3.51 GAA and was the starter for the 1989 Stanley Cup Playoffs with a stellar 2.61 post-season GAA, getting the Hawks to the Campbell Conference finals before losing to the eventual Stanley Cup champion Calgary Flames.

Starting the next season again with Chicago, Chevrier was traded on March 6, 1990, to the Pittsburgh Penguins for future considerations, and he saw limited action. For the 1990–91 season, Chevrier got picked up by the Detroit Red Wings as a free agent, but only saw three games of action (0–2–0) in the NHL as he would spend most of the time in the IHL with the San Diego Gulls. He retired after the season ended.

== Personal life ==
After finishing his playing career, Chevrier moved to Boca Raton, Florida, where he lives with his family and operates an insurance business.

== Career statistics ==
=== Regular season and playoffs ===
			Regular season									Playoffs
Season	Team	League	GP	W	L	T	MIN	GA	SO	GAA	SV%	GP	W	L	MIN	GA	SO	GAA	SV%
1978–79	Cornwall Royals	QMJHL	7	—	—	—	332	37	0	6.69	.810	—	—	—	—	—	—	—	—
1979–80	Ottawa Jr. Senators	OJHL	34	—	—	—	1818	119	0	3.93	—	—	—	—	—	—	—	—	—
1980–81	Miami University	CCHA	16	—	—	—	778	44	0	3.39	—	—	—	—	—	—	—	—	—
1981–82	Miami University	CCHA	19	8	10	1	1053	73	0	4.16	—	—	—	—	—	—	—	—	—
1982–83	Miami University	CCHA	33	15	16	1	1894	125	—	3.96	—	—	—	—	—	—	—	—	—
1983–84	Miami University	CCHA	32	9	19	1	1509	123	—	4.89	—	—	—	—	—	—	—	—	—
1984–85	Fort Wayne Komets	IHL	56	26	21	7	3219	194	0	3.62	—	9	5	4	556	28	0	3.02	—
1985–86	New Jersey Devils	NHL	37	11	18	2	1862	143	0	3.60	.850	—	—	—	—	—	—	—	—
1986–87	New Jersey Devils	NHL	58	24	26	2	3153	227	0	4.32	.873	—	—	—	—	—	—	—	—
1987–88	New Jersey Devils	NHL	45	18	19	3	2354	148	1	3.77	.868	—	—	—	—	—	—	—	—
1988–89	Winnipeg Jets	NHL	22	8	8	2	1092	78	1	4.29	.859	—	—	—	—	—	—	—	—
1988–89	Chicago Blackhawks	NHL	27	13	11	2	1573	92	0	3.51	.876	16	9	7	1013	44	0	2.61	.909
1989–90	Chicago Blackhawks	NHL	39	16	14	3	1894	132	0	4.18	.853	—	—	—	—	—	—	—	—
1989–90	Pittsburgh Penguins	NHL	3	1	2	0	166	14	0	5.06	.843	—	—	—	—	—	—	—	—
1990–91	Detroit Red Wings	NHL	3	0	2	0	108	11	0	6.11	.800	—	—	—	—	—	—	—	—
1990–91	San Diego Gulls	IHL	32	10	16	1	1689	124	0	4.40	—	—	—	—	—	—	—	—	—
NHL totals			234	91	100	14	12,202	845	2	4.16	.864	16	9	7	1013	44	0	2.61	.909
