= Rick Hayward (ice hockey) =

American ice hockey player (born 1966)

- Born: February 25, 1966 (age 60) Toledo, Ohio, U.S.
- Height: 6 ft 2 in (188 cm)
- Weight: 200 lb (91 kg; 14 st 4 lb)
- Position: Defense
- Shot: Left
- Played for: Los Angeles Kings; Frankfurt Lions
- NHL draft: 162nd overall, 1986; Montreal Canadiens
- Playing career: 1986–2001

Ricky Douglas "Hazy" Hayward (born February 25, 1966) is an American former ice hockey player. He played 4 games in the National Hockey League with the Los Angeles Kings during the 1990–91 season. The rest of his career, which lasted from 1986 to 2001, was mainly spent in the minor leagues.

== Early life ==
Hayward was born in Toledo, Ohio. As a youth, he played in the 1979 Quebec International Pee-Wee Hockey Tournament with a minor ice hockey team from Detroit.

== Career ==
Hayward was drafted 162nd overall by the Montreal Canadiens in the 1986 NHL entry draft and played four games for the Los Angeles Kings during the 1990–91 NHL season, scoring no points and collecting five penalty minutes. After leaving the NHL, Hayward played for the Phoenix Roadrunners, Capital District Islanders, Moncton Hawks, Cincinnati Cyclones, and Cleveland Lumberjacks. Internationally, he played for Löwen Frankfurt in the Deutsche Eishockey Liga. His final season was spent with the Alaska Aces.

== Career statistics ==
=== Regular season and playoffs ===
			Regular season					Playoffs
Season	Team	League	GP	G	A	Pts	PIM	GP	G	A	Pts	PIM
1983–84	Hull Olympiques	QMJHL	67	6	17	23	220	—	—	—	—	—
1984–85	Hull Olympiques	QMJHL	56	7	27	34	367	5	0	1	1	56
1985–86	Hull Olympiques	QMJHL	59	3	40	43	354	—	—	—	—	—
1985–86	Hull Olympiques	M-Cup	—	—	—	—	—	5	0	1	1	26
1986–87	Sherbrooke Canadiens	AHL	46	2	3	5	153	3	0	1	1	15
1987–88	Sherbrooke Canadiens	AHL	22	1	5	6	91	—	—	—	—	—
1987–88	Saginaw Hawks	IHL	24	3	4	7	129	—	—	—	—	—
1987–88	Salt Lake Golden Eagles	IHL	17	1	3	4	124	13	0	1	1	118
1988–89	Salt Lake Golden Eagles	IHL	72	4	20	24	313	10	4	3	7	42
1989–90	Salt Lake Golden Eagles	IHL	58	5	13	18	419	7	1	2	3	71
1990–91	Los Angeles Kings	NHL	4	0	0	0	5	—	—	—	—	—
1990–91	Phoenix Roadrunners	IHL	60	9	13	22	369	7	1	2	3	44
1991–92	Capital District Islanders	AHL	27	3	8	11	139	7	0	0	0	58
1992–93	Capital District Islanders	AHL	19	0	1	1	80	4	1	1	2	27
1992–93	Moncton Hawks	AHL	47	1	3	4	231	—	—	—	—	—
1993–94	Cincinnati Cyclones	IHL	61	2	6	8	302	8	0	1	1	99
1994–95	Cleveland Lumberjacks	IHL	56	1	3	4	269	3	0	0	0	13
1995–96	Cleveland Lumberjacks	IHL	53	0	6	6	244	3	0	0	0	6
1996–97	Cleveland Lumberjacks	IHL	73	2	10	12	244	13	0	0	0	36
1997–98	Cleveland Lumberjacks	IHL	1	3	4	191	—	—	—	—	—
1997–98	Quebec Rafales	IHL	13	0	3	3	108	—	—	—	—	—
1998–99	Frankfurt Lions	DEL	28	0	0	0	113	—	—	—	—	—
1999–00	Frankfurt Lions	DEL	50	0	1	1	122	5	0	0	0	6
2000–01	Anchorage Aces	WCHL	15	0	1	1	88	3	0	0	0	36
2000–01	Tallahassee Tiger Sharks	ECHL	16	0	4	4	74	—	—	—	—	—
IHL totals			529	28	84	112	2712	57	5	7	12	340
NHL totals			4	0	0	0	5	—	—	—	—	—
