= Shawn Rivers =

Canadian ice hockey player

- Born: January 30, 1971 (age 55) Ottawa, Ontario, Canada
- Height: 5 ft 10 in (178 cm)
- Weight: 185 lb (84 kg; 13 st 3 lb)
- Position: Defence
- Shot: Left
- Played for: Tampa Bay Lightning
- NHL draft: Undrafted
- Playing career: 1992–1998

Shawn Hamilton Rivers (born January 30, 1971) is a Canadian former professional ice hockey defenceman. He played four games in the National Hockey League with the Tampa Bay Lightning during the 1992–93 season, scoring two assists. Prior to his professional career, he played for the St. Lawrence University Skating Saints, where he was named the ECAC All Rookie Team for the 1988–89 season. Shawn is the brother of Jamie Rivers.

Rivers was born in Ottawa, Ontario.

== Career statistics ==
=== Regular season and playoffs ===
			Regular season					Playoffs
Season	Team	League	GP	G	A	Pts	PIM	GP	G	A	Pts	PIM
1988–89	St. Lawrence University	ECAC	36	3	23	26	20	—	—	—	—	—
1989–90	St. Lawrence University	ECAC	26	3	14	17	29	—	—	—	—	—
1990–91	Sudbury Wolves	OHL	66	18	33	51	43	5	2	7	9	0
1991–92	Sudbury Wolves	OHL	64	26	54	80	34	11	0	4	4	10
1992–93	Atlanta Knights	IHL	78	9	34	43	101	9	1	3	4	8
1992–93	Tampa Bay Lightning	NHL	4	0	2	2	2	—	—	—	—	—
1993–94	Atlanta Knights	IHL	76	6	30	36	88	12	1	4	5	21
1994–95	Chicago Wolves	IHL	68	8	29	37	69	3	0	1	1	0
1995–96	Chicago Wolves	IHL	21	3	4	7	22	—	—	—	—	—
1995–96	Atlanta Knights	IHL	45	2	16	18	22	—	—	—	—	—
1995–96	Syracuse Crunch	AHL	5	0	2	2	2	16	1	6	7	14
1996–97	Augsburger Panther	DEL	48	8	20	28	22	—	—	—	—	—
1997–98	Lake Charles Ice Pirates	WPHL	5	3	3	6	2	—	—	—	—	—
1997–98	EHC Kloten	NLA	13	0	6	6	16	—	—	—	—	—
1997–98	San Antonio Dragons	IHL	14	2	4	6	6	—	—	—	—	—
1997–98	Springfield Falcons	AHL	3	0	0	0	0	—	—	—	—	—
NHL totals			4	0	2	2	2	—	—	—	—	—

== Awards and honors ==
Award	Year
All-ECAC Hockey Rookie Team	1988–89
