= Keith Osborne =

Canadian ice hockey player (born 1969)

- Born: April 2, 1969 (age 57) Toronto, Ontario, Canada
- Height: 6 ft 1 in (185 cm)
- Weight: 180 lb (82 kg; 12 st 12 lb)
- Position: Right Wing
- Shot: Right
- Played for: St. Louis Blues; Tampa Bay Lightning
- NHL draft: 12th overall, 1987; St. Louis Blues
- Playing career: 1989–2001

Keith J. Osborne (born April 2, 1969) is a Canadian former professional ice hockey right winger.

== Career ==
Osborne was drafted in the first round, 12th overall, by the St. Louis Blues in the 1987 NHL entry draft. He played just five games with the Blues, during the 1989–90 season. He also played eleven games with the Tampa Bay Lightning in the 1992–93 season.

In his sixteen-game National Hockey League career, Osborne scored one goal and added three assists.

Keith is the head coach of the Welland Jr. Canadians of the Greater Ontario Junior Hockey League. He previously coached for the Port Colborne Pirates (now Pelham Panthers) of the same league before leaving to join Welland.

== Career statistics ==
			Regular season					Playoffs
Season	Team	League	GP	G	A	Pts	PIM	GP	G	A	Pts	PIM
1985–86	Toronto Red Wings AAA	MTHL	42	48	63	111	36	—	—	—	—	—
1986–87	North Bay Centennials	OHL	61	34	55	89	31	24	11	11	22	25
1987–88	North Bay Centennials	OHL	30	14	22	36	20	4	1	5	6	8
1988–89	North Bay Centennials	OHL	15	11	15	26	12	—	—	—	—	—
1988–89	Niagara Falls Thunder	OHL	50	34	49	83	45	17	12	13	25	36
1989–90	Peoria Rivermen	IHL	56	23	24	47	58	5	1	1	2	4
1989–90	St. Louis Blues	NHL	5	0	2	2	8	—	—	—	—	—
1990–91	Newmarket Saints	AHL	12	0	3	3	6	—	—	—	—	—
1990–91	Peoria Rivermen	IHL	54	10	20	30	79	—	—	—	—	—
1991–92	St. John's Maple Leafs	AHL	53	11	16	27	21	4	0	1	1	2
1992–93	Atlanta Knights	IHL	72	40	49	89	91	8	1	5	6	2
1992–93	Tampa Bay Lightning	NHL	11	1	1	2	8	—	—	—	—	—
1993–94	Grasshopper Club Zürich	CHE.2	36	26	29	55	80	4	0	6	6	25
1994–95	Grasshopper Club Zürich	CHE.2	12	5	9	14	4	—	—	—	—	—
1995–96	Peoria Rivermen	IHL	63	23	28	51	64	9	5	3	8	12
1996–97	San Antonio Dragons	IHL	52	12	13	25	41	—	—	—	—	—
1996–97	Utah Grizzlies	IHL	9	3	0	3	4	3	1	0	0	0
1997–98	Winston-Salem IceHawks	UHL	50	26	35	61	60	—	—	—	—	—
1997–98	Augsburger Panther	DEL	15	1	5	6	20	—	—	—	—	—
1998–99	Saginaw Gears	UHL	73	20	49	69	72	—	—	—	—	—
1999–2000	Saginaw/Ohio Gears	UHL	70	15	55	70	71	—	—	—	—	—
2000–01	Macon Whoopee	CHL	16	3	6	9	24	—	—	—	—	—
IHL totals			306	111	134	245	337	23	7	9	16	18
NHL totals			16	1	3	4	16	—	—	—	—	—
UHL totals			193	61	139	200	203	—	—	—	—	—

Awards and achievements
Preceded by Jocelyn Lemieux	St. Louis Blues first-round draft pick 1987	Succeeded by Rod Brind'Amour
