= Cleveland Lumberjacks =

Ice hockey team in Ohio, US

- City: Cleveland, Ohio
- League: International Hockey League
- Operated: 1965–2001
- Home arena: Richfield Coliseum (cap.20,000) 1992–1994; Gund Arena (cap. 20,056) 1994–2001
- Colors: Blue, gold, black
- Owners: Larry Gordon (1992-2000); Hank Kassigkeit (2000-2001)
- Media: WUAB (1992–1994); WBNX (1994–1995); WKNR (1995–2001)
- Affiliates: Minnesota Wild (2000–2001); Chicago Blackhawks (1999–2000); Tampa Bay Lightning (1998–1999); Pittsburgh Penguins (1992–1997)

Franchise history
- 1960–1965: Muskegon Zephyrs
- 1965–1984: Muskegon Mohawks
- 1984–1992: Muskegon Lumberjacks
- 1992–2001: Cleveland Lumberjacks

The original Lumberacks logo from 1992 to 1995

The Cleveland Lumberjacks were an International Hockey League (IHL) team based in Cleveland, Ohio, played their home games at the Richfield Coliseum, and later Gund Arena.

== History ==
Originally formed in 1960 in Muskegon, Michigan, as the Muskegon Zephyrs, the team was renamed the Mohawks in 1965 and the Lumberjacks in 1984. The team moved to Cleveland in 1992 as part of the IHL's move upmarket, bringing professional hockey back to Cleveland for the first time since the Cleveland Barons played in the NHL in 1978. It later folded along with the IHL at the end of the 2000–01 season. Cleveland returned to have hockey with the new Cleveland Barons of the AHL in 2001, which lasted until 2006.

In the 1995 hockey action movie Sudden Death starring Jean-Claude van Damme, Lumberjacks players impersonated the Chicago Blackhawks.

On December 16, 2011, before a Lake Erie Monsters game former Lumberjack Jock Callander had his number 15 retired in honor of his career as a member of the Lumberjacks, as well as his involvement in hockey initiatives in the Cleveland area.

== Season-by-season record ==
Note: GP = Games played, W = Wins, L = Losses, T = Ties, OTL = Overtime losses/Shootout losses, Pts = Points, GF = Goals for, GA = Goals against, PIM = Penalties in minutes

Season	GP	W	L	OTL	SOL	Pts	GF	GA	PIM	Finish	Playoffs
1992-1993	82	39	34	4	5	87	329	330	2324	2nd, Atlantic	Lost in round 1
1993–1994	81	31	36	14	0	76	278	344	1600	3rd, Atlantic	Out of playoffs
1994–1995	81	34	37	10	0	78	306	339	2157	4th, Northern	Lost in round 1
1995–1996	82	43	27	0	12	98	334	330	2258	3rd, Central	Lost in round 1
1996–1997	82	40	32	0	10	90	286	280	1820	2nd, Central	Lost in round 3
1997–1998	82	35	37	0	10	80	228	262	2151	4th, Central	Lost in round 2
1998–1999	82	28	47	0	7	63	248	310	1847	4th, Central	Out of playoffs
1999–2000	82	40	30	0	12	92	225	238	2154	4th, East	Lost in round 2
2000–2001	82	43	32	0	7	93	270	258	1603	4th, East	Lost in round 1

=== Playoffs ===
Season	1st round	2nd round	3rd round	Finals
1992–1993	L, 0–4, FW	—	—	—
1993–1994	Out of Playoffs			
1994–1995	L, 1–3, CIN	—	—	—
1995-1996	L, 0–3, MCH	—	—	—
1996-1997	W, 3–1, IND	W, 4–1, ORL	L, 1–4, DET	—
1997-1998	W, 3–1, FW	L, 2–4, ORL	—	—
1998-1999	Out of Playoffs			
1999–2000	W, 2–1, MIL	L, 2–4, GR	—	—
2000-2001	L, 0–4, GR	—	—	—

== Team records ==
Goals: 48 Tom Rodgers (1993–1994)
Assists: 70 Jock Callander (1993–1994)
Points: 112 Dave Michayluk (1992–1993)
Points, Defenseman: 68 Dale DeGray (1994–1995)
Penalty Minutes: 427 Paul Laus (1992–1993)
Wins: 26 Rob Dopson (1992–1993)
Shutouts: 6 Zac Bierk (2000–2001)
GAA: 2.68 Evgeni Nabokov (1999–2000)
SV%: .920 Evgeni Nabokov (1999–2000)
Career Goals: 181 Jock Callander
Career Assists: 279 Jock Callander
Career Points: 460 Jock Callander
Career Penalty Minutes: 948 Rick Hayward
Career Goaltending Wins: 43 Philippe DeRouville
Career Shutouts: 6 Zac Bierk
Career Games: 501 Jock Callander
