= Jeff Bloemberg =

Canadian ice hockey player

- Born: January 31, 1968 (age 58) Listowel, Ontario, Canada
- Height: 6 ft 2 in (188 cm)
- Weight: 205 lb (93 kg; 14 st 9 lb)
- Position: Defence
- Shot: Right
- Played for: New York Rangers
- NHL draft: 93rd overall, 1986; New York Rangers
- Playing career: 1987–1999

Jeff Bloemberg (born January 31, 1968) is a Canadian former professional ice hockey defenceman who played four seasons in the National Hockey League with the New York Rangers from 1988–89 to 1991–92.

Born in Listowel, Ontario, Bloemberg was drafted in the fifth round, 93rd overall, in the 1986 NHL entry draft by the Rangers. He played forty-three career NHL games, scoring three goals and six assists for nine points. He also played seven career playoff games, tabulating three assists.

== Career statistics ==
| | | | Regular season | | | | | Playoffs |
| Season | Team | League | GP | G | A | Pts | PIM | GP | G | A | Pts | PIM |
|---|---|---|---|---|---|---|---|---|---|---|---|---|
| 1984–85 | Listowel Cyclones | MWJHL | 31 | 7 | 14 | 21 | 73 | — | — | — | — | — |
| 1985–86 | North Bay Centennials | OHL | 60 | 2 | 11 | 13 | 76 | 8 | 1 | 2 | 3 | 9 |
| 1986–87 | North Bay Centennials | OHL | 60 | 5 | 13 | 18 | 91 | 21 | 1 | 6 | 7 | 13 |
| 1987–88 | North Bay Centennials | OHL | 46 | 9 | 26 | 35 | 60 | 4 | 1 | 4 | 5 | 2 |
| 1987–88 | Colorado Rangers | IHL | 5 | 0 | 0 | 0 | 0 | 11 | 1 | 0 | 1 | 8 |
| 1988–89 | New York Rangers | NHL | 9 | 0 | 0 | 0 | 0 | — | — | — | — | — |
| 1988–89 | Denver Rangers | IHL | 64 | 7 | 22 | 29 | 55 | 1 | 0 | 0 | 0 | 0 |
| 1989–90 | New York Rangers | NHL | 28 | 3 | 3 | 6 | 25 | 7 | 0 | 3 | 3 | 5 |
| 1989–90 | Flint Spirits | IHL | 41 | 7 | 21 | 28 | 24 | — | — | — | — | — |
| 1990–91 | New York Rangers | NHL | 3 | 0 | 2 | 2 | 0 | — | — | — | — | — |
| 1990–91 | Binghamton Rangers | AHL | 77 | 16 | 46 | 62 | 28 | 10 | 0 | 6 | 6 | 10 |
| 1991–92 | New York Rangers | NHL | 3 | 0 | 1 | 1 | 0 | — | — | — | — | — |
| 1991–92 | Binghamton Rangers | AHL | 66 | 6 | 41 | 47 | 22 | 11 | 1 | 10 | 11 | 10 |
| 1992–93 | Cape Breton Oilers | AHL | 76 | 6 | 45 | 51 | 34 | 16 | 5 | 10 | 15 | 10 |
| 1993–94 | Springfield Indians | AHL | 78 | 8 | 28 | 36 | 36 | 6 | 0 | 3 | 3 | 8 |
| 1994–95 | Adirondack Red Wings | AHL | 44 | 5 | 19 | 24 | 10 | 4 | 0 | 0 | 0 | 0 |
| 1995–96 | Adirondack Red Wings | AHL | 72 | 10 | 28 | 38 | 32 | 3 | 0 | 1 | 1 | 4 |
| 1996–97 | Adirondack Red Wings | AHL | 69 | 5 | 31 | 36 | 24 | 4 | 0 | 3 | 3 | 2 |
| 1997–98 | Berlin Capitals | DEL | 23 | 3 | 7 | 10 | 14 | 4 | 0 | 0 | 0 | 2 |
| 1998–99 | Revierlöwen Oberhausen | DEL | 52 | 3 | 17 | 20 | 54 | — | — | — | — | — |
| NHL totals | | | 43 | 3 | 6 | 9 | 25 | 7 | 0 | 3 | 3 | 5 |
| AHL totals | | | 482 | 56 | 238 | 294 | 186 | 54 | 6 | 33 | 39 | 44 |
