= Jock Callander =

Canadian ice hockey player (born 1961)

- Born: April 23, 1961 (age 65) Regina, Saskatchewan, Canada
- Height: 6 ft 1 in (185 cm)
- Weight: 188 lb (85 kg; 13 st 6 lb)
- Position: Centre
- Shot: Right
- Played for: Pittsburgh Penguins; Tampa Bay Lightning
- NHL draft: Undrafted
- Playing career: 1982–2000

William Darren "Jock" Callander (born April 23, 1961) is a Canadian former professional ice hockey player, and current front office executive, part-time assistant coach, and TV analyst for the Cleveland Monsters of the American Hockey League. He played in the National Hockey League with the Pittsburgh Penguins and Tampa Bay Lightning, winning the Stanley Cup with the Penguins in 1992.

== Career ==
Callander, the younger brother of NHL player Drew, replaced a small NHL career with a historic one in the IHL. Never drafted, he had brief stops with the St. Louis Blues, Pittsburgh Penguins, and Tampa Bay Lightning, but with the Muskegon/Cleveland Lumberjacks he was sensational, registering 1,242 career points, only 10 points behind Len Thornson's IHL record.

Callander started slowly in junior with the Regina Pats, but in his last two seasons he produced staggering totals of 146 goals and 343 points, leading the league in 1981–82. Nonetheless, he was never drafted by an NHL team, signing with St. Louis as a free agent, though never playing for the Blues. Instead, he had to settle for a start in the CHL and IHL, where he spent the first five pro years of his career. He signed with Pittsburgh, and over the next three years split his time between the Penguins and the IHL.

The highlight of his NHL time came in 1991–92. After playing the whole year with Muskegon, he came up to the Penguins for the playoffs, appearing in a dozen games en route to the Stanley Cup. At the 1992 victory celebration for the Pittsburgh Penguins at Three Rivers Stadium, Callander lost his watch to a fan who had inadvertently grabbed it while slapping hands. Over the summer, though, he became a free agent and Pittsburgh did not sign him; instead, he went to Tampa Bay. Callander played eight games with the Lightning and most of the next eight years back in the IHL with Cleveland.

== Personal life ==
Callander retired from hockey following the 1999–2000 season and became an assistant coach for Cleveland in 2000–01 before joining the Houston Aeros the following year.

In 2007, Callander returned to Cleveland to work with the city's then-new American Hockey League franchise, the Lake Erie Monsters. He is a color analyst for the team's TV broadcasts, serves as an assistant coach for games not televised, and works in the team's front office as Vice President of Hockey Affairs and Team Services.

Muskegon retired his number 15 jersey before a Muskegon Lumberjacks (1992–2010) game at the L. C. Walker Arena on October 23, 2009.

On December 16, 2011, before a Monsters game at Quicken Loans Arena in Cleveland, Callander had his number 15 retired in honor of his career as a member of the Lumberjacks, as well as his involvement in hockey initiatives in the Cleveland area.

== Career statistics ==
			Regular season					Playoffs
Season	Team	League	GP	G	A	Pts	PIM	GP	G	A	Pts	PIM
1978–79	Regina Blues	SJHL	42	44	42	86	24	—	—	—	—	—
1978–79	Regina Pats	WHL	19	3	2	5	0	—	—	—	—	—
1979–80	Providence College	ECAC	3	0	1	1	0	—	—	—	—	—
1979–80	Regina Pats	WHL	39	9	11	20	25	18	8	6	14	0
1979–80	Regina Pats	MC	—	—	—	—	—	4	1	2	3	0
1980–81	Regina Pats	WHL	72	67	86	153	37	11	6	7	13	14
1981–82	Regina Pats	WHL	71	79	111	190	59	20	13	26	39	37
1982–83	Salt Lake Golden Eagles	CHL	68	20	27	47	26	6	0	1	1	9
1983–84	Montana Magic	CHL	72	27	32	59	69	—	—	—	—	—
1983–84	Toledo Goaldiggers	IHL	2	0	0	0	0	—	—	—	—	—
1984–85	Muskegon Lumberjacks	IHL	82	39	68	107	86	17	8	13	21	33
1985–86	Muskegon Lumberjacks	IHL	82	39	72	111	121	14	12	11	23	12
1986–87	Muskegon Lumberjacks	IHL	82	54	82	136	110	15	13	7	20	23
1987–88	Pittsburgh Penguins	NHL	41	11	16	27	45	—	—	—	—	—
1987–88	Muskegon Lumberjacks	IHL	31	20	36	56	49	6	2	3	5	25
1988–89	Pittsburgh Penguins	NHL	30	6	5	11	20	10	2	5	7	10
1988–89	Muskegon Lumberjacks	IHL	48	25	39	64	40	7	5	5	10	30
1989–90	Pittsburgh Penguins	NHL	30	4	7	11	49	—	—	—	—	—
1989–90	Muskegon Lumberjacks	IHL	46	29	49	78	118	15	6	14	20	54
1990–91	Muskegon Lumberjacks	IHL	30	14	20	34	102	—	—	—	—	—
1991–92	Muskegon Lumberjacks	IHL	81	42	70	112	160	10	4	10	14	13
1991–92	Pittsburgh Penguins	NHL	—	—	—	—	—	12	1	3	4	2
1992–93	Tampa Bay Lightning	NHL	8	1	1	2	2	—	—	—	—	—
1992–93	Atlanta Knights	IHL	69	34	50	84	172	9	7	5	12	25
1993–94	Cleveland Lumberjacks	IHL	81	31	70	101	126	—	—	—	—	—
1994–95	Cleveland Lumberjacks	IHL	61	24	36	60	90	4	2	2	4	6
1995–96	Cleveland Lumberjacks	IHL	81	42	53	95	150	3	1	0	1	8
1996–97	Cleveland Lumberjacks	IHL	61	20	34	54	56	14	7	6	13	10
1997–98	Cleveland Lumberjacks	IHL	72	20	33	53	105	10	5	6	11	6
1998–99	Cleveland Lumberjacks	IHL	81	28	26	54	121	—	—	—	—	—
1999–2000	Cleveland Lumberjacks	IHL	64	16	27	43	83	9	1	5	6	6
IHL totals			1054	477	765	1242	1689	133	73	87	160	251
NHL totals			109	22	29	51	116	22	3	8	11	12

== Awards and honors ==
- Bob Brownridge Memorial Trophy (WHL leading scorer) - 1982
- Two-time IHL All-Star Team Selection - 1987, 1992
- Leo P. Lamoureux Memorial Trophy (Leading Scorer - IHL) (1987) (tied with Jeff Pyle)
- James Gatschene Memorial Trophy (MVP - IHL) (1987) (co-winner - Jeff Pyle)
- 1992 Stanley Cup Championship (as a member of the Pittsburgh Penguins)
- Two-time Turner Cup Champion (as a member of the Muskegon Lumberjacks) - 1986, 1989
- 2016 Calder Cup Champion (as an assistant coach/front office executive/announcer for the Lake Erie Monsters)
- Number 15 retired by:
  - the Cleveland Monsters
  - the Muskegon/Cleveland Lumberjacks
  - the Regina Pats
