= Brian Bradley =

Canadian ice hockey player

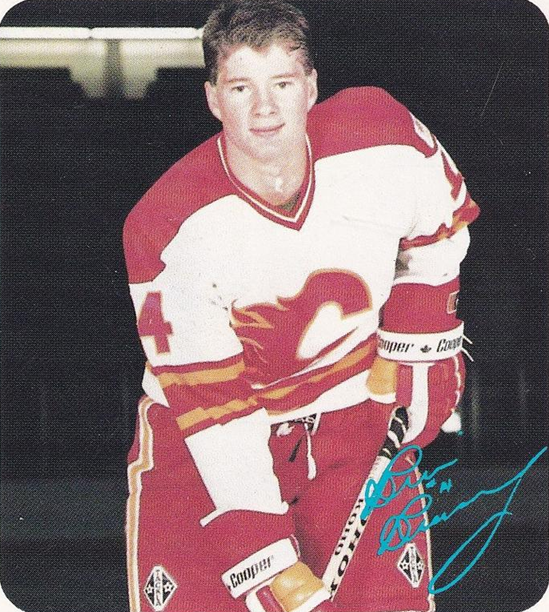
- Bradley in 1986 photo
- Born: January 21, 1965 (age 61) Kitchener, Ontario, Canada
- Height: 5 ft 10 in (178 cm)
- Weight: 180 lb (82 kg; 12 st 12 lb)
- Position: Centre
- Shot: Right
- Played for: Calgary Flames; Vancouver Canucks; Toronto Maple Leafs; Tampa Bay Lightning
- National team: Canada
- NHL draft: 51st overall, 1983; Calgary Flames
- Playing career: 1986–1998

Brian Richard Walter Bradley (born January 21, 1965) is a Canadian former professional ice hockey player. Bradley played for a number of different hockey teams in many different leagues. He played for the London Knights in the early 1980s before being selected 51st overall, in the 3rd round, by the Calgary Flames at the 1983 NHL entry draft. Bradley spent a season with the Canadian national team before moving to the National Hockey League (NHL) for good.

== Playing career ==
As a youth, Bradley played in the 1978 Quebec International Pee-Wee Hockey Tournament with a minor ice hockey team from Kitchener, Ontario.

Brian Bradley's NHL debut came in the 1985–86 season with the Calgary Flames, where he saw very limited action (only 5 regular season games and one playoff game), although his first playoff game was during the 1986 Stanley Cup Final against the Montreal Canadiens. He would spend most of the season with the Moncton Golden Flames (Calgary's minor league team), where he was linemates with future superstar Brett Hull.

In 1988, after arriving back from playing with Canadian National Men's Hockey Team, where he spent most of the 1986–87 NHL season playing, Bradley was traded to the Vancouver Canucks. During the 1989 playoffs, Bradley would tie rookie Trevor Linden with a team-leading 7 points in seven games. His best regular season totals with the Canucks came in the 1989–90 season when he scored a team respectable 48 points and was awarded The Canucks' "Most Exciting Player Award" by Canuck fans. He started out the 1990–91 season playing strongly, only to be traded to the Toronto Maple Leafs for mobile defenceman Tom Kurvers.

In 1992, the expansion Tampa Bay Lightning acquired him in the 1992 NHL Expansion Draft, and he would become the team's first star. He would score the team's first preseason goal against the Minnesota North Stars. He would set personal highs in goals, assists and points before the All-Star Break. At the end of Tampa Bay's inaugural season, Bradley led the team with a career high 42 goals and 86 points. He played well enough throughout the season that he also made his NHL All-Star debut. In 1995–96 he set a personal high of 56 assists. That same year the Lightning debuted in the NHL playoffs. The next season (1996–97) Brian Bradley would score the first goal in the history of the Ice Palace arena. Unfortunately, he would be sidelined for most of the 1997-98 season due to a concussion. He would remain with the Lightning until retiring due to chronic injuries on September 23, 1999.

== Post-hockey life ==
Bradley is still affiliated with the Lightning's organization and makes frequent appearances on Bally Sports Sun television, which broadcasts regular season Lightning games.

On March 29, 2017, Bradley was inducted into the Sports Club of Tampa Bay Hall of Fame as part of the Hall's 34th class. Bradley became the third member of the Lightning organization to be inducted. This is Bradley's second hall of fame induction in that he is also a member of the Waterloo Region Hall of Fame in his hometown of Kitchener, Ontario.

== Career statistics ==
=== Regular season and playoffs ===
			Regular season					Playoffs
Season	Team	League	GP	G	A	Pts	PIM	GP	G	A	Pts	PIM
1980–81	Guelph Platers	OPJHL	42	31	40	71	59	—	—	—	—	—
1980–81	Wexford Raiders	OPJHL	4	1	1	2	2	—	—	—	—	—
1981–82	London Knights	OHL	62	34	44	78	34	4	0	1	1	6
1982–83	London Knights	OHL	67	37	82	119	37	3	1	0	1	0
1983–84	London Knights	OHL	49	40	60	100	24	4	2	4	6	0
1983–84	Colorado Flames	CHL	—	—	—	—	—	4	2	0	2	2
1984–85	London Knights	OHL	32	27	49	76	22	8	5	10	15	4
1985–86	Moncton Golden Flames	AHL	59	23	42	65	40	10	6	9	15	4
1985–86	Calgary Flames	NHL	5	0	1	1	0	1	0	0	0	0
1986–87	Moncton Golden Flames	AHL	20	12	16	28	8	6	3	3	6	16
1986–87	Calgary Flames	NHL	40	10	18	28	16	—	—	—	—	—
1987–88	Canada	Intl	54	18	23	41	42	—	—	—	—	—
1987–88	Vancouver Canucks	NHL	11	3	5	8	6	—	—	—	—	—
1988–89	Vancouver Canucks	NHL	71	18	27	45	42	7	3	4	7	10
1989–90	Vancouver Canucks	NHL	67	19	29	48	65	—	—	—	—	—
1990–91	Vancouver Canucks	NHL	44	11	20	31	42	—	—	—	—	—
1990–91	Toronto Maple Leafs	NHL	26	0	11	11	20	—	—	—	—	—
1991–92	Toronto Maple Leafs	NHL	59	10	21	31	48	—	—	—	—	—
1992–93	Tampa Bay Lightning	NHL	80	42	44	86	92	—	—	—	—	—
1993–94	Tampa Bay Lightning	NHL	78	24	40	64	56	—	—	—	—	—
1994–95	Tampa Bay Lightning	NHL	46	13	27	40	42	—	—	—	—	—
1995–96	Tampa Bay Lightning	NHL	75	23	56	79	77	5	0	3	3	6
1996–97	Tampa Bay Lightning	NHL	35	7	17	24	16	—	—	—	—	—
1997–98	Tampa Bay Lightning	NHL	14	2	5	7	6	—	—	—	—	—
NHL totals			651	182	321	503	528	13	3	7	10	16

=== International ===
Year	Team	Event	GP	G	A	Pts	PIM
1985	Canada	WJC	7	9	5	14	2
1988	Canada	OG	7	0	4	4	0

== Awards and honours ==
- Selected to two NHL All-Star Games: 1993, 1994
- Held the NHL record for most goals scored (42) by a single player in an expansion team's inaugural season from 1993-2018.
- Inducted into the Tampa Bay Lightning Hall of Fame in 2025.
