= Atlanta Knights =

Professional ice hockey team

- City: Atlanta, Georgia
- League: International Hockey League
- Conference: Eastern
- Division: Central
- Founded: 1992
- Folded: 1996
- Home arena: Omni Coliseum
- Colors: Black, blue and gray
- Owner: David Berkman

Franchise history
- 1992–1996: Atlanta Knights
- 1996–1998: Quebec Rafales

Championships
- Division titles: 1993, 1994
- Conference titles: 1994
- Turner Cups: 1994

The Atlanta Knights were a minor league professional ice hockey team in the International Hockey League from 1992 to 1996. The Knights were based in Atlanta, and played at the Omni Coliseum. In 1994 the Knights won the Turner Cup which was the IHL championship. The team became the Quebec Rafales in 1996.

== History ==
The Atlanta Knights was an IHL expansion team in 1992 as the top farm team of the NHL's Tampa Bay Lightning. They won the Turner Cup in the 1993–94 season. The Knights featured the first professional Black head coach in John Paris Jr. They were also one of the first professional teams to play a female goalie, Manon Rhéaume, in a regular-season game.

=== Record in Atlanta ===
Year	GP	W	L	RT	PTS	Finish	Playoffs
1992–93	82	52	23	7	111	1st, Atlantic	Lost semi-finals
1993–94	81	45	22	14	104	1st, Midwest	Won Turner Cup
1994–95	81	39	37	5	83	3rd, Central	Lost in round one
1995–96	82	32	41	9	73	4th, Central	Lost in round one

==== 1992–93 ====
Led by team captain and IHL legend Jock Callander and a 40-goal production from right winger Keith Osborne (each in their only season with the club), head coach Gene Ubriaco's Knights would prove to be among the league's most well known sides, setting franchise single-season records in wins (52), points (111) and goals scored (333) en route to claiming the Atlantic Division championship.

The initial Knights roster featured many players that would go on to cement themselves into the folklore of the club, among them centers Brent Gretzky and Colin Miller; wingers Christian Campeau, Stan Drulia and Jason Ruff; defencemen Jeff Buchanan, Eric Dubois, Chris LiPuma and Shawn Rivers; and goalkeepers Jean-Claude Bergeron and Mike Greenlay.

The inaugural Knights campaign also featured the North American professional hockey debuts of both Manon Rhéaume (two games, 0–1–0, 6.36 GAA) and the 1992 NHL entry draft's #1 overall pick, Roman Hamrlik (two games, one goal, one assist, two points, two penalty minutes), a future three-time NHL All-Star.

==== 1993–94: Turner Cup Champions ====
In 1993–94, the Knights became the first Atlanta-based sports franchise since the 1968 Atlanta Chiefs of the North American Soccer League to win a professional championship, capturing the Turner Cup in a best-of-seven finals victory over the Fort Wayne Komets, four games to two.

The season-long goalkeepers J.C. Bergeron (27–11–7, 3.07) and Mike Greenlay (16–10–4, 3.58) were awarded the James Norris Memorial Trophy (IHL). The play from off-season acquisitions Steve Larouche and Jeff Madill as well as the blueline brilliance of Jeff Buchanan, Eric Charron, Cory Cross and Eric Dubois contributed to the Knights' second-consecutive division championship.

The 1993–94 season also saw Knights' legend Stan Drulia establish single-season club records for goals (54), assists (60), and points (114). The captain's extraordinary play carried over into the post season, culminating in his being awarded the Norman R. "Bud" Poile Trophy (IHL) as MVP of the Turner Cup Playoffs with a 13-goal, 25 point performance over the tournament's 14-game span.

4-0 series sweeps in each of the Turner Cup Playoff's first two rounds (vs. the Milwaukee Admirals and San Diego Gulls (1990–95) respectively) earned the Knights their first Finals appearance. Greenlay's brilliant play continued throughout the tournament, with the netminder posting an eye-popping 11–1 record, a microscopic 2.32 GAA and an outstanding .910 save percentage in 13 playoff appearances.

==== 1995–96: Relocation ====
For the 1996–97 season, the Knights relocated due to the Omni's impending demolition to make way for Philips Arena, a facility that would become home to Atlanta's second NHL expansion team, the Atlanta Thrashers. During their years in Atlanta, Rick Morgan was their full-time national anthem singer and encouraged the crowd to shout "KNIGHTS!" during the line, "Gave proof through the "KNIGHTS" that our flag was still there." It was customary to hear "KNIGHTS!" shouted during the national anthem at Atlanta Thrashers games at Philips Arena by spectators in honor of their team, and the tradition has carried over to Atlanta United FC soccer matches at Mercedes-Benz Stadium and to Atlanta Gladiators games at Gas South Arena.

=== Club records ===
Single season

Games played: Eric Dubois, Steve Larouche, Jeff Madill, Colin Miller (80, 1993–94)

Goals: Stan Drulia (54, 1993–94)

Assists: Stan Drulia (60, 1993–94)

Jamie Sargent (60, 1997–98)

Points: Stan Drulia (114, 1993–94)

Penalty Minutes: Chris LiPuma (379, 1992–93)

Wins: J.C. Bergeron (27, 1993–94)

Goals against average: Derek Wilkinson (3.01, 1994–95)

Career

Games played: Christian Campeau (282)

Goals: Stan Drulia (161)

Assists: Stan Drulia (191)

Points: Stan Drulia (352)

Penalty minutes: Chris LiPuma (970)

Wins: J.C. Bergeron (60)

Goals against average: David Littman (3.36)

Playoff (season, career)

Games played:

Goals: Steve Larouche (1993–94: 16), Stan Drulia & Steve Larouche (16)

Assists: Jason Ruff (1993–94: 17), Stan Drulia (22)

Points: Steve Larouche (1993–94: 26), Stan Drulia (38)

Penalty minutes:

Wins: Mike Greenlay (1993–94 & career: 11)

Goals against average: Mike Greenlay (1993–94 & career: 2.32)

Affiliates

- Tampa Bay Lightning (1992–1996)
